= List of South Africa national under-20 rugby union team players =

Below is a listing of all South African rugby union players that have represented the South Africa Under-20 side since the World Rugby Under 20 Championship competition was launched in 2008.

The "Years" column indicates the tournament(s) in which each player played.

List of South Africa national under-20 rugby union players
Name	Province	Years
Shaun Adendorff	Blue Bulls	2012
Cecil Afrika	Griffons	2008
Hyron Andrews	Sharks	2015
Juarno Augustus	Western Province	2017
Brummer Badenhorst	Western Province	2010
Tango Balekile	Eastern Province Kings	2016
Mlungisi Bali	Blue Bulls	2010
Henri Bantjes	Blue Bulls	2008
Craig Barry	Western Province	2011
Andrew Beerwinkel	Blue Bulls	2013
Ulrich Beyers	Blue Bulls	2011
Clayton Blommetjies	Blue Bulls	2009
Kwenzo Blose	Free State Cheetahs	2016, 2017
Fabian Booysen	Golden Lions	2012
Curwin Bosch	Sharks	2016, 2017
Arno Botha	Blue Bulls	2011
Ruan Botha	Golden Lions	2012
Zane Botha	Blue Bulls	2009
Rikus Bothma	Western Province	2015
Cyle Brink	Golden Lions	2014
David Brits	Western Province	2017
Francois Brummer	Blue Bulls	2008, 2009
David Bulbring	Golden Lions	2009
Jan-Henning Campher	Blue Bulls	2016
Nizaam Carr	Western Province	2011
Tendayi Chikukwa	Blue Bulls	2009
Jeanluc Cilliers	Golden Lions	2017
Marné Coetzee	Blue Bulls	2013
Jean Cook	Free State Cheetahs	2011
Kyle Cooper	Sharks	2009
Lionel Cronjé	Free State Cheetahs	2009
Ross Cronjé	Sharks	2009
Zain Davids	Western Province	2016, 2017
Aidon Davis	Eastern Province Kings	2013, 2014
Tinus de Beer	Blue Bulls	2015
Luan de Bruin	Free State Cheetahs	2013
Sebastian de Chaves	Golden Lions	2010
Allan Dell	Sharks	2012
Francois de Villiers	Sharks	2017
Ruben de Villiers	Western Province	2016
Stephan Dippenaar	Blue Bulls	2008
Ruan Dreyer	Golden Lions	2010
Daniël du Plessis	Western Province	2015
Jacques du Plessis	Blue Bulls	2013
Jean-Luc du Plessis	Sharks	2014
Branco du Preez	Blue Bulls	2010
Cornell du Preez	Leopards	2011
Dan du Preez	Sharks	2015
Jean-Luc du Preez	Sharks	2014, 2015
Robert du Preez	Sharks	2013
Wessel du Rand	Golden Lions	2010
François du Toit	Golden Lions	2010
Jacques du Toit	Free State Cheetahs	2013
Pieter-Steph du Toit	Sharks	2012
Thomas du Toit	Sharks	2014, 2015
Dewaldt Duvenage	Boland Cavaliers	2008
Joseph Dweba	Golden Lions	2014, 2015
Robert Ebersohn	Free State Cheetahs	2008, 2009
Sias Ebersohn	Free State Cheetahs	2008, 2009
Corniel Els	Blue Bulls	2014
Rynhardt Elstadt	Western Province	2009
André Esterhuizen	Sharks	2014
Eben Etzebeth	Western Province	2011
Corné Fourie	Blue Bulls	2008
Stedman Gans	Blue Bulls	2016, 2017
Justin Geduld	Western Province	2013
Warrick Gelant	Blue Bulls	2014, 2015
Johan Goosen	Free State Cheetahs	2011
Lloyd Greeff	Leopards	2014
Abrie Griesel	Blue Bulls	2012
Johan Grobbelaar	Blue Bulls	2017
Wikus Groenewald	Western Province	2017
Njabulo Gumede	Blue Bulls	2015
Monde Hadebe	Sharks	2010
James Hall	Eastern Province Kings	2016
Dean Hammond	Western Province	2012
Stokkies Hanekom	Western Province	2009
Yaya Hartzenberg	Western Province	2009
Irné Herbst	Blue Bulls	2013
Wiehahn Herbst	Leopards	2008
Grant Hermanus	Western Province	2015
Cornell Hess	Blue Bulls	2008
Denzel Hill	Blue Bulls	2016
Jaco Holtzhausen	Blue Bulls	2016
Francois Hougaard	Blue Bulls	2008
Patrick Howard	Western Province	2012
Travis Ismaiel	Blue Bulls	2012
JT Jackson	Blue Bulls	2015, 2016
Adri Jacobs	Blue Bulls	2010
Lohan Jacobs	Blue Bulls	2010, 2011
Malcolm Jaer	Eastern Province Kings	2015
Benhard Janse van Rensburg	Leopards	2016
Nico Janse van Rensburg	Blue Bulls	2014
Rohan Janse van Rensburg	Blue Bulls	2013, 2014
Marco Jansen van Vuren	Golden Lions	2015, 2016
Elton Jantjies	Blue Bulls	2010
Tony Jantjies	Blue Bulls	2012
Jason Jenkins	Blue Bulls	2015
John-Roy Jenkinson	Leopards	2011
Dan Jooste	Western Province	2017
Paul Jordaan	Sharks	2011, 2012
Oli Kebble	Western Province	2012
Frik Kirsten	Blue Bulls	2008
Jannes Kirsten	Blue Bulls	2013
Steven Kitshoff	Western Province	2012
Francois Kleinhans	Sharks	2011
Cheslin Kolbe	Western Province	2013
Siya Kolisi	Western Province	2010, 2011
Nick Köster	Western Province	2008
Stephan Kotzé	Free State Cheetahs	2011
Dan Kriel	Blue Bulls	2014
Jesse Kriel	Blue Bulls	2013, 2014
Rewan Kruger	Free State Cheetahs	2017
Pat Lambie	Sharks	2010
Dillyn Leyds	Western Province	2012
Manie Libbok	Blue Bulls	2016, 2017
Hanro Liebenberg	Blue Bulls	2015
Wiaan Liebenberg	Blue Bulls	2012
Gianni Lombard	Golden Lions	2017
Wilco Louw	Blue Bulls	2014
MB Lusaseni	Sharks	2008
Thabo Mabuza	Golden Lions	2014
Mosolwa Mafuma	Free State Cheetahs	2016
Khaya Majola	Sharks	2012
Mzamo Majola	Sharks	2015
Lionel Mapoe	Free State Cheetahs	2008
Franco Marais	Sharks	2012
Jandré Marais	Sharks	2009
Peet Marais	Sharks	2010
Thiliphatu Marole	Sharks	2008
Devon Martinus	Golden Lions	2013
Malcolm Marx	Golden Lions	2014
Len Massyn	Golden Lions	2017
Sampie Mastriet	Blue Bulls	2009, 2010
Lee-Marvin Mazibuko	Western Province	2017
Bongi Mbonambi	Blue Bulls	2011
Tshotsho Mbovane	Western Province	2011, 2012
Morné Mellett	Blue Bulls	2009
Wandile Mjekevu	Golden Lions	2010, 2011
Zee Mkhabela	Free State Cheetahs	2014
Salmaan Moerat	Western Province	2017
Bradley Moolman	Blue Bulls	2011
Tera Mtembu	Sharks	2010
Freddie Muller	Western Province	2010
Martin Muller	Western Province	2008
Nqoba Mxoli	Blue Bulls	2014
Franco Naudé	Blue Bulls	2016
Ox Nché	Free State Cheetahs	2015
Khanyo Ngcukana	Western Province	2015
Sabelo Nhlapo	Sharks	2008
S'busiso Nkosi	Sharks	2016
Abongile Nonkontwana	Blue Bulls	2014, 2015
Reinhard Nothnagel	Golden Lions	2017
Luther Obi	Leopards	2013
Kene Okafor	Sharks	2009, 2010
Caylib Oosthuizen	Golden Lions	2009
Coenie Oosthuizen	Free State Cheetahs	2009
NJ Oosthuizen	Eastern Province Kings	2016
Marvin Orie	Blue Bulls	2012
Rudy Paige	Golden Lions	2009
Embrose Papier	Blue Bulls	2016, 2017
Yaw Penxe	Eastern Province Kings	2017
Sergeal Petersen	Eastern Province Kings	2014
Wilton Pietersen	Free State Cheetahs	2008
Junior Pokomela	Eastern Province Kings	2016
Handré Pollard	Western Province, Blue Bulls	2012, 2013, 2014
Mark Pretorius	Golden Lions	2012
Pieter Rademan	Free State Cheetahs	2011
Julian Redelinghuys	Sharks	2009
Raymond Rhule	Free State Cheetahs	2012
Jéan Rossouw	Western Province	2008
Carlü Sadie	Western Province	2016, 2017
Johann Sadie	Western Province	2009
Nico Scheepers	Free State Cheetahs	2010
JD Schickerling	Western Province	2014
Marais Schmidt	Golden Lions	2012
Juan Schoeman	Blue Bulls	2011
Marnus Schoeman	Blue Bulls	2009
Pierre Schoeman	Blue Bulls	2014
Nick Schonert	Sharks	2011
Louis Schreuder	Western Province	2010
Tom Seabela	Blue Bulls	2008, 2009
Victor Sekekete	Golden Lions	2014
Seabelo Senatla	Free State Cheetahs	2013
Jan Serfontein	Blue Bulls	2012
Wandisile Simelane	Golden Lions	2017
S'bura Sithole	Sharks	2010
Sti Sithole	Western Province	2013
Courtnall Skosan	Blue Bulls	2011
William Small-Smith	Blue Bulls	2012
Roelof Smit	Blue Bulls	2013
JP Smith	Blue Bulls	2014
Kwagga Smith	Golden Lions	2013
Eli Snyman	Blue Bulls	2016
RG Snyman	Blue Bulls	2015
CJ Stander	Blue Bulls	2009, 2010
Jannie Stander	Golden Lions	2013
Hendré Stassen	Blue Bulls	2017
Gerhard Steenekamp	Blue Bulls	2017
Ruan Steenkamp	Blue Bulls	2013
Braam Steyn	Sharks	2012
Dries Swanepoel	Blue Bulls	2013
Jaco Taute	Golden Lions	2010, 2011
Jason Thomas	Blue Bulls	2012
Brandon Thomson	Western Province	2015
Stefan Ungerer	Sharks	2013
Muller Uys	Western Province	2017
Franco van den Berg	Blue Bulls	2016
Gerhard van den Heever	Blue Bulls	2009
Duhan van der Merwe	Blue Bulls	2014
Edwill van der Merwe	Western Province	2016
Jan van der Merwe	Blue Bulls	2015
Marcel van der Merwe	Free State Cheetahs	2010
Fanie van der Walt	Free State Cheetahs	2010
Vian van der Watt	Golden Lions	2012
Dayan van der Westhuizen	Blue Bulls	2014
Johan van Deventer	Golden Lions	2008
Maks van Dyk	Sharks	2012
Ruben van Heerden	Blue Bulls	2017
Ernst van Rhyn	Western Province	2016, 2017
Gerrit-Jan van Velze	Blue Bulls	2008
Michael van Vuuren	Free State Cheetahs	2011
PW van Vuuren	Free State Cheetahs	2008
Frans van Wyk	Western Province	2015
Kobus van Wyk	Western Province	2012
Ivan van Zyl	Blue Bulls	2015
Francois Venter	Blue Bulls	2010, 2011
Hanco Venter	Sharks	2013
Ruan Venter	Golden Lions	2011
Jacques Vermeulen	Western Province	2014, 2015
Keanu Vers	Eastern Province Kings	2016
EW Viljoen	Western Province	2015
Dennis Visser	Blue Bulls	2013
Jeremy Ward	Eastern Province Kings	2016
Stefan Watermeyer	Blue Bulls	2008
Carl Wegner	Free State Cheetahs	2011
Johnny Welthagen	Leopards	2011
Cobus Wiese	Western Province	2016
Damian Willemse	Western Province	2017
Mike Willemse	Western Province	2013
Paul Willemse	Golden Lions	2012
Percy Williams	Golden Lions	2013
Vainon Willis	Blue Bulls	2008
Nama Xaba	Western Province	2017
Eduard Zandberg	Western Province	2016
Leolin Zas	Western Province	2015
Players in green also played for the national team.

== See also ==
- South Africa national under-20 rugby union team
- IRB Junior World Championship
