= 2014 Currie Cup Premier Division =

South African rugby season

- Countries: South Africa
- Date: 9 August – 25 October 2014
- Matches played: 43
- Attendance: 478,392 (average 11,125 per match)
- Tries scored: 258 (average 6 per match)
- Top point scorer: Demetri Catrakilis (Western Province) & Jacques-Louis Potgieter (Blue Bulls) (123)
- Top try scorer: Jaco Kriel (Golden Lions) (9)

The 2014 Currie Cup Premier Division was the 76th season in the competition since it started in 1889 and was contested from 9 August to 25 October 2014. The tournament (known as the Absa Currie Cup Premier Division for sponsorship reasons) is the top tier of South Africa's premier domestic rugby union competition.

== Competition ==
There was eight participating teams in the 2014 Currie Cup Premier Division. A proposed expansion to eight teams was initially rejected, but was then subsequently approved on 13 February 2014.

=== Qualification ===
The six franchise 'anchor' teams plus the Pumas automatically qualified to the 2014 Currie Cup Premier Division, plus the winner of a qualifying tournament between the other seven teams.

=== Regular season and title playoffs ===
The eight teams were divided into two sections, based on their 2013 positions. Teams in each section played each other twice over the course of the season, once at home and once away. Teams also played cross-section matches, playing one match (either home or away) against the teams in the other sections.

Teams received four points for a win and two points for a draw. Bonus points were awarded to teams that scored 4 or more tries in a game, as well as to teams that lost a match by 7 points or less. Teams were ranked by points, then points difference (points scored less points conceded).

The top 4 teams qualified for the title play-offs. In the semi-finals, the team that finished first had home advantage against the team that finished fourth, while the team that finished second had home advantage against the team that finished third. The winners of these semi-finals played each other in the final, at the home venue of the higher-placed team.

=== Relegation playoffs ===
Non-franchise teams finishing in the bottom two would be included in the qualification rounds for the following season.

== Teams ==
Location of teams in 2014 Currie Cup Premier Division

=== Team Listing ===
2014 Currie Cup Premier Division teams
Section X
Team	Sponsored Name	Stadium/s	Sponsored Name
Blue Bulls	Vodacom Blue Bulls	Loftus Versfeld, Pretoria	Loftus Versfeld
Eastern Province Kings	Eastern Province Kings	Nelson Mandela Bay Stadium, Port Elizabeth	Nelson Mandela Bay Stadium
Golden Lions	Xerox Lions	Ellis Park Stadium, Johannesburg	Ellis Park Stadium
Western Province	DHL Western Province	Newlands Stadium, Cape Town	DHL Newlands
Section Y
Team	Sponsored Name	Stadium/s	Sponsored Name
Free State Cheetahs	Toyota Free State Cheetahs	Free State Stadium, Bloemfontein	Free State Stadium
Griquas	GWK Griquas	Griqua Park, Kimberley	GWK Park
Pumas	Steval Pumas	Mbombela Stadium, Mbombela	Mbombela Stadium
Sharks	Cell C Sharks	Kings Park Stadium, Durban	Growthpoint Kings Park

=== Attendances ===
The following attendance figures were published at the end of the season:

2014 Currie Cup Premier Division attendances
Team	First Round	Semi-Finals	Final	Total	Average
Western Province	79,029	29,857	44,505	153,391	21,913
Golden Lions	57,432	35,558	—N/a	92,990	15,498
Sharks	57,417	—N/a	—N/a	57,417	11,483
Eastern Province Kings	53,570	—N/a	—N/a	53,570	10,714
Blue Bulls	47,135	—N/a	—N/a	47,135	9,427
Free State Cheetahs	37,764	—N/a	—N/a	37,764	7,553
Pumas	24,924	—N/a	—N/a	24,924	4,985
Griquas	11,200	—N/a	—N/a	11,200	2,240
Total	368,472	65,415	44,505	478,392	11,125

== Log ==
The final log of the round-robin stage of the 2014 Currie Cup Premier Division is:

2014 Currie Cup Premier Division log
Pos	Team	Pld	W	D	L	PF	PA	PD	TF	TA	TB	LB	Pts	Qualification
1	Western Province	10	8	0	2	335	206	+129	40	23	6	1	39	Semi-finals
2	Golden Lions	10	7	0	3	362	206	+156	44	21	7	1	36	Semi-finals
3	Sharks	10	7	1	2	287	222	+65	26	20	2	1	33	Semi-finals
4	Blue Bulls	10	6	0	4	271	235	+36	27	23	3	1	28	Semi-finals
5	Free State Cheetahs	10	3	1	6	249	294	−45	28	33	4	3	21	
6	Pumas	10	4	0	6	237	269	−32	25	28	2	2	20	
7	Griquas	10	3	0	7	220	332	−112	25	41	2	2	16	2015 Currie Cup qualification
8	Eastern Province Kings	10	1	0	9	206	403	−197	27	53	1	1	6 (Note: The Blue Bulls, Eastern Province Kings, Free State Cheetahs, Golden Lions, Sharks and Western Province are exempt from relegation.)	

Rules for classification: 4 points for a win; 2 points for a draw; 1 bonus point for a loss by seven points or less; 1 bonus point for scoring four or more tries in a match

== Fixtures and results ==
The fixtures for the 2014 Currie Cup Premier Division were released on 11 March 2014:

=== Round one ===
Section X	8 August 2014	Eastern Province Kings	16–35	Western Province	Nelson Mandela Bay Stadium, Port Elizabeth
	19:10	Try: Luke Watson 33'; Kevin Luiters 68'; Con: Scott van Breda (0/2); Pen: Scott van Breda 15', 18' (2/2)	Report; Scoreboard	Try: Patrick Howard 7'; Nizaam Carr 45'; Michael van der Spuy 55'; Cheslin Kolbe 83'; Con: Demetri Catrakilis 8', 46', 56' (3/3); Robert du Preez (0/1); Pen: Demetri Catrakilis 20', 52', 60' (3/3); Cards: Manuel Carizza (yellow card) 18' to 28'; Pat Cilliers (yellow card) 27' to 37'; Seabelo Senatla (yellow card) 65' to 75'	Attendance: 20,564; Referee: Jaco Peyper

Section Y	9 August 2014	Griquas	24–31	Sharks	Griqua Park, Kimberley
	14:45	Try: Marnus Schoeman 57'; Carel Greeff 64'; Ederies Arendse 79'; Con: Nico Scheepers 58', 65', 80' (3/3); Pen: Nico Scheepers 4' (1/2); Drop: Francois Brummer (0/1); Cards: Johnathan Francke (red card) 7'	Report; Scoreboard	Try: Fred Zeilinga 32'; Paul Jordaan 40'; S'bura Sithole 59'; Con: Fred Zeilinga 40', 60' (2/3); Pen: Fred Zeilinga 18', 24', 53', 82' (4/6); Cards: Thomas du Toit (yellow card) 45' to 55'	Attendance: 4,000; Referee: Craig Joubert

Section X	9 August 2014	Golden Lions	41–13	Blue Bulls	Ellis Park Stadium, Johannesburg
	17:05	Try: Stokkies Hanekom 4'; Ruan Combrinck 36'; Jaco Kriel 65'; Warwick Tecklenburg 80'; Con: Marnitz Boshoff 5', 37' (2/2); Jaco van der Walt 66' (1/2); Pen: Marnitz Boshoff 12', 32' (2/2); Jaco van der Walt 55', 61' (2/2); Drop: Marnitz Boshoff 20' (1/1)	Report; Scoreboard	Try: Sampie Mastriet 41'; Con: Jacques-Louis Potgieter 42' (1/1); Pen: Jacques-Louis Potgieter 8', 48' (2/4)	Attendance: 13,561; Referee: Jaco van Heerden

Section Y	9 August 2014	Pumas	28–21	Free State Cheetahs	Mbombela Stadium, Mbombela
	19:10	Try: JW Bell 20'; Corné Steenkamp 32'; JW Jonker 66'; Con: Justin van Staden 21', 67' (2/3); Pen: Justin van Staden 10', 55', 62' (3/5); JC Roos (0/1); Cards: Justin van Staden (yellow card) 35' to 45'	Report; Scoreboard	Try: Rayno Benjamin 5', 72'; Con: Willie du Plessis 6' (1/1); Elgar Watts (0/1); Pen: Willie du Plessis 23', 27', 35' (3/4); Elgar Watts (0/1); Drop: Willie du Plessis (0/1); Cards: Sarel Pretorius (yellow card) 54' to 64'	Attendance: 4,820; Referee: Marius van der Westhuizen

=== Round two ===
Section Y	15 August 2014	Sharks	34–17	Pumas	Kings Park Stadium, Durban
	19:10	Try: SP Marais 41'; Jacques Botes 58'; Tera Mtembu 68'; Monde Hadebe 78'; Con: Fred Zeilinga 42' (1/1); Patrick Lambie 59', 69', 79' (3/3); Pen: Fred Zeilinga 8', 20' (2/4); Drop: Fred Zeilinga (0/1); Cards: Marco Wentzel (yellow card) 47' to 57'	Report; Scoreboard	Try: Frikkie Spies 4'; Renaldo Bothma 49'; Con: Justin van Staden 5' (1/1); JC Roos 50' (1/1); Pen: JC Roos 45' (1/2)	Attendance: 7,615; Referee: Christie du Preez

Section X	16 August 2014	Western Province	41–17	Blue Bulls	Newlands Stadium, Cape Town
	14:05	Try: Seabelo Senatla 9', 56'; Pat Cilliers 16'; Nizaam Carr 24'; Michael Rhodes 66'; Juan de Jongh 80'; Con: Demetri Catrakilis 10', 17', 57', 67' (4/5); Kurt Coleman (0/1); Pen: Demetri Catrakilis 52' (1/1); Cards: Manuel Carizza (yellow card) 54' to 66'; Kobus van Wyk (yellow card) 62' to 72'	Report; Scoreboard	Try: Bongi Mbonambi 72'; Con: Tony Jantjies (0/1); Pen: Jacques-Louis Potgieter 14', 21', 42', 46' (4/4); Drop: Jacques-Louis Potgieter (0/1); Cards: JJ Engelbrecht (yellow card) 55' to 65'; Grant Hattingh (yellow card) 65' to 77'	Attendance: 16,652; Referee: Rasta Rasivhenge

Section X	16 August 2014	Golden Lions	60–19	Eastern Province Kings	Ellis Park Stadium, Johannesburg
	14:30	Try: Stokkies Hanekom 5'; Jaco Kriel 23', 38'; Ruan Combrinck 29'; Robbie Coetzee 44'; Derick Minnie 52'; Willie Britz 61'; Andries Coetzee 67'; Kwagga Smith 82'; Con: Jaco van der Walt 6', 45', 53', 62', 68', 83' (6/9); Pen: Jaco van der Walt 36' (1/2)	Report; Scoreboard	Try: Ronnie Cooke 2'; Aidon Davis 59'; Scott van Breda 70'; Con: Gary van Aswegen 3' (1/1); George Whitehead (0/1); Scott van Breda 71' (1/1); Pen: Gary van Aswegen (0/1); Cards: Thembelani Bholi (yellow card) 22'	Attendance: 5,955; Referee: Craig Joubert

Section Y	16 August 2014	Free State Cheetahs	34–27	Griquas	Free State Stadium, Bloemfontein
	15:00	Try: Elgar Watts 23'; Sarel Pretorius 37'; Rayno Benjamin 43'; Raymond Rhule 66', 72'; Con: Elgar Watts 24', 44' (2/3); Willie du Plessis 67' (1/2); Pen: Elgar Watts 17' (1/2)	Report; Scoreboard	Try: Wayne Stevens 7'; Marnus Schoeman 50', 77'; Ederies Arendse 79'; Con: Nico Scheepers 8' (1/1); Marais Schmidt 80' (1/3); Pen: Marais Schmidt 40' (1/1); Drop: Francois Brummer (0/1); Cards: Steph Roberts (yellow card) 63' to 73'	Attendance: 11,991; Referee: Marius Jonker

=== Round three ===
Section Y	22 August 2014	Pumas	33–15	Griquas	Mbombela Stadium, Mbombela
	19:10	Try: Trompie Pretorius 34', 42'; Renaldo Bothma 60'; Corné Steenkamp 80'; Con: Justin van Staden 61' (1/3); JC Roos 81' (1/1); Pen: Justin van Staden 2', 32' (2/3); JC Roos 68' (1/1)	Report; Scoreboard	Try: Marnus Schoeman 29'; Dean Grant 37'; Con: Francois Brummer (0/1); Dean Grant 38' (1/1); Pen: Francois Brummer (0/1); Dean Grant 47' (1/1); Drop: Francois Brummer (0/1)	Attendance: 2,371; Referee: Quinton Immelman

Section X	23 August 2014	Blue Bulls	30–25	Eastern Province Kings	Loftus Versfeld, Pretoria
	15:00	Try: Deon Stegmann 15'; Akona Ndungane 55', 59'; Jesse Kriel 63'; Con: Tony Jantjies 60', 64' (2/3); Jesse Kriel (0/1); Pen: Tony Jantjies 6', 27' (2/4); Cards: Tony Jantjies (yellow card) 45' to 56'	Report; Scoreboard	Try: Shane Gates 7'; Lizo Gqoboka 42'; Michael van Vuuren 65'; Con: Scott van Breda 43', 66' (2/3); Pen: Scott van Breda 37', 50' (2/2); Cards: Michael van Vuuren (yellow card) 54' to 65'	Attendance: 5,219; Referee: Pro Legoete

Section X	23 August 2014	Western Province	27–14	Golden Lions	Newlands Stadium, Cape Town
	17:05	Try: Kobus van Wyk 11', 16'; Jaco Taute 73'; Con: Demetri Catrakilis 12', 17' (2/2); Kurt Coleman 74' (1/1); Pen: Demetri Catrakilis 46', 58' (2/2)	Report; Scoreboard	Try: Andries Coetzee 38'; Con: Ruan Combrinck (0/1); Pen: Ruan Combrinck 30', 43', 53' (3/3)	Attendance: 14,325; Referee: Craig Joubert

Section Y	23 August 2014	Sharks	19–16	Free State Cheetahs	Kings Park Stadium, Durban
	19:10	Try: Tonderai Chavhanga 68'; Con: Fred Zeilinga 69' (1/1); Pen: Fred Zeilinga 31', 42', 58', 76' (4/5)	Report; Scoreboard	Try: Clayton Blommetjies 26'; Con: Willie du Plessis 27' (1/1); Pen: Willie du Plessis 22', 25', 44' (3/3)	Attendance: 16,223; Referee: Rasta Rasivhenge

=== Round four ===
Section Y	29 August 2014	Pumas	32–22	Sharks	Mbombela Stadium, Mbombela
	19:10	Try: Stefan Watermeyer 70'; Giant Mtyanda 73'; Renaldo Bothma 24'; Justin van Staden 37'; Con: JC Roos 71', 74' (2/2); Justin van Staden 25' (1/2); Pen: Justin van Staden 21', 31' (2/2)	Report; Scoreboard	Try: SP Marais 55'; Con: Fred Zeilinga 56' (1/1); Pen: Fred Zeilinga 42', 61', 7', 32', 36' (5/5); Cards: Odwa Ndungane (yellow card) 49' to 60'	Attendance: 6,161; Referee: Ben Crouse

Section Y	30 August 2014	Griquas	25–36	Free State Cheetahs	Griqua Park, Kimberley
	15:00	Try: Tian Meyer 49'; Martin Bezuidenhout 56'; Ederies Arendse 82'; Con: Dean Grant 57', 82' (2/3); Pen: Dean Grant 39', 55' (2/3); Cards: Carel Greeff (yellow card) 13' to 23' (red card) 34'	Report; Scoreboard	Try: Francois Uys 13'; Rayno Benjamin 36'; Clayton Blommetjies 59'; Tienie Burger 65'; Jean Cook 71'; Con: Willie du Plessis 37' (1/2); Pieter-Steyn de Wet 60', 66', 72' (3/3); Pen: Willie du Plessis 8' (1/2); Cards: Henco Venter (yellow card) 56' to 67'; Torsten van Jaarsveld (yellow card) 76'	Attendance: 3,500; Referee: Jaco van Heerden

Section X	30 August 2014	Blue Bulls	18–23	Western Province	Loftus Versfeld, Pretoria
	17:05	Try: Jacques du Plessis 48'; Sampie Mastriet 76'; Con: Joshua Stander 49' (1/1); Tian Schoeman (0/1); Pen: Joshua Stander (0/1); Tian Schoeman 55', 69' (2/2)	Report; Scoreboard	Try: Kobus van Wyk 56'; Seabelo Senatla 59'; Con: Demetri Catrakilis 57', 60' (2/2); Pen: Kurt Coleman 34', 72' (2/2); Demetri Catrakilis 46' (1/1)	Attendance: 11,608; Referee: Craig Joubert

Section X	30 August 2014	Eastern Province Kings	22–41	Golden Lions	Nelson Mandela Bay Stadium, Port Elizabeth
	19:10	Try: penalty try 28'; Shane Gates 32'; Siviwe Soyizwapi 39'; Con: Scott van Breda 29', 33' (2/3); Drop: George Whitehead 45' (1/1)	Report; Scoreboard	Try: Jaco Kriel 3'; Ruan Dreyer 17'; Schalk van der Merwe 36'; Franco Mostert 70'; Derick Minnie 80'; Con: Ruan Combrinck 4', 18', 37', 71', 81' (5/5); Pen: Ruan Combrinck 60', 64' (2/2); Cards: Lionel Mapoe (yellow card) 28' to 38'; Ross Cronjé (yellow card) 73'	Attendance: 9,034; Referee: Marius van der Westhuizen

=== Round Five ===
Section X	5 September 2014	Western Province	49–14	Eastern Province Kings	Newlands Stadium, Cape Town
	19:10	Try: Juan de Jongh 11', 22'; Siya Kolisi 17', 78'; Cheslin Kolbe 48'; Kobus van Wyk 58'; Rynhardt Elstadt 72'; Con: Demetri Catrakilis 12', 18', 23', 49', 59' (5/5); Kurt Coleman 73', 79' (2/2); Pen: Demetri Catrakilis (0/1); Cards: Rynhardt Elstadt (yellow card) 57' to 67'	Report; Scoreboard	Try: Paul Schoeman 30'; Tim Whitehead 81'; Con: Scott van Breda 31', 82' (2/2); Pen: Scott van Breda (0/1); Cards: David Bulbring (yellow card) 70' to 80'	Attendance: 11,210; Referee: Stuart Berry

Section Y	6 September 2014	Free State Cheetahs	17–31	Pumas	Free State Stadium, Bloemfontein
	15:00	Try: JP du Plessis 33'; Sarel Pretorius 50'; Con: Pieter-Steyn de Wet 34', 51' (2/2); Pen: Pieter-Steyn de Wet 62' (1/1); Cards: Rayno Benjamin (yellow card) 77'	Report; Scoreboard	Try: Hennie Skorbinski 18'; Roscko Speckman 72'; Marius Coetzer 77'; Con: Justin van Staden 19' (1/1); JC Roos 73' (1/2); Pen: Justin van Staden 26', 30', 38', 59' (4/4); Drop: Justin van Staden (0/1)	Attendance: 4,903; Referee: Craig Joubert

Section Y	6 September 2014	Sharks	18–21	Griquas	Kings Park Stadium, Durban
	17:05	Try: Lourens Adriaanse 24'; Thomas du Toit 76'; Con: Fred Zeilinga (0/1); Lionel Cronjé 77' (1/1); Pen: Fred Zeilinga 17' (1/2); Lionel Cronjé 64' (1/2)	Report; Scoreboard	Pen: Gouws Prinsloo 2', 7', 21', 30', 37', 69' (6/8); Drop: Francois Brummer 81' (1/2); Cards: Ederies Arendse (yellow card) 52' to 63'	Attendance: 12,424; Referee: Lourens van der Merwe

Section X	6 September 2014	Blue Bulls	36–26	Golden Lions	Loftus Versfeld, Pretoria
	19:10	Try: Ulrich Beyers 23'; Burger Odendaal 50'; Grant Hattingh 79'; Con: Jacques-Louis Potgieter 24', 51', 80' (3/3); Pen: Jacques-Louis Potgieter 6', 16', 19', 31', 45' (5/7); Ulrich Beyers (0/1); Drop: Jacques-Louis Potgieter (0/1)	Report; Scoreboard	Try: Kwagga Smith 69'; Martin Muller 74'; Con: Ruan Combrinck 70', 75' (2/2); Pen: Ruan Combrinck 3', 9', 28', 33' (4/4); Cards: Ruan Dreyer (yellow card) 52' to 63'	Attendance: 9,592; Referee: Marius van der Westhuizen

=== Round Six ===
Section X	12 September 2014	Eastern Province Kings	13–28	Blue Bulls	Nelson Mandela Bay Stadium, Port Elizabeth
	19:10	Try: Darron Nell 82'; Con: Tobie Botes 83' (1/1); Pen: Scott van Breda 29', 33' (2/3); Cards: David Bulbring (yellow card) 68' to 78'	Report; Scoreboard	Try: William Small-Smith 24'; Bjorn Basson 46'; Deon Stegmann 64'; Con: Jacques-Louis Potgieter 47', 65' (2/3); Pen: Jacques-Louis Potgieter 8', 40', 60' (3/3); Drop: Jacques-Louis Potgieter (0/1); Cards: Bongi Mbonambi (yellow card) 12' to 22'; Deon Stegmann (red card) 69'	Attendance: 13,400; Referee: Quinton Immelman

Section Y	13 September 2014	Free State Cheetahs	30–30	Sharks	Free State Stadium, Bloemfontein
	15:00	Try: Sarel Pretorius 12', 23'; Tienie Burger 53'; Con: Willie du Plessis 13', 23', 54' (3/3); Pen: Willie du Plessis 38', 69', 82' (3/3); Cards: George Marich (yellow card) 27' to 37'	Report; Scoreboard	Try: S'bura Sithole 34'; André Esterhuizen 65'; Tera Mtembu 77'; Con: Lionel Cronjé 35', 66', 78' (3/3); Pen: Lionel Cronjé 9', 40', 61' (3/5)	Attendance: 6,556; Referee: Stuart Berry

Section Y	13 September 2014	Griquas	31–27	Pumas	Griqua Park, Kimberley
	15:00	Try: PJ Vermeulen 40'; Con: Gouws Prinsloo 40' (1/1); Pen: Gouws Prinsloo 3', 22', 25', 34', 43', 49', 54', 63' (8/8)	Report; Scoreboard	Try: Reynier van Rooyen 38'; JW Jonker 56'; Con: Coenie van Wyk (0/1); Justin van Staden 57' (1/1); Pen: Justin van Staden 30', 32', 45', 58' (4/4); JC Roos 73' (1/1)	Attendance: 1,500; Referee: Craig Joubert

Section X	13 September 2014	Golden Lions	35–33	Western Province	Ellis Park Stadium, Johannesburg
	17:05	Try: Schalk van der Merwe 7'; Lionel Mapoe 39'; Akker van der Merwe 53'; Jaco Kriel 58'; Franco Mostert 68'; Con: Ruan Combrinck 8', 40', 55', 59', 69' (5/5); Pen: Ruan Combrinck (0/2)	Report; Scoreboard	Try: Juan de Jongh 17'; Justin Geduld 78'; Michael Rhodes 82'; Con: Kurt Coleman 18' (1/1); Cheslin Kolbe 78' (1/1); Demetri Catrakilis 83' (1/1); Pen: Kurt Coleman 15', 30', 50', 52' (4/4)	Attendance: 19,875; Referee: Jaco Peyper

=== Round Seven ===
Cross-Section	19 September 2014	Golden Lions	29–15	Pumas	Ellis Park Stadium, Johannesburg
	19:10	Try: Stokkies Hanekom 4'; Ruan Dreyer 8'; Courtnall Skosan 27'; Franco Mostert 44'; Con: Ruan Combrinck 5', 28', 45' (3/4); Drop: Jaco van der Walt 66' (1/1)	Report; Scoreboard	Try: Stefan Watermeyer 68'; Vincent Koch 80'; Con: JC Roos 81' (1/2); Pen: Justin van Staden 26' (1/1); Cards: Trompie Pretorius (yellow card) 12' to 22'; Frank Herne (yellow card) 74'	Attendance: 6,010; Referee: Jaco van Heerden

Cross-Section	20 September 2014	Eastern Province Kings	22–37	Free State Cheetahs	Nelson Mandela Bay Stadium, Port Elizabeth
	15:00	Try: Ntabeni Dukisa 31'; Siyanda Grey 55'; Dwayne Jenner 77'; Con: Gary Van Aswegen 32' (1/2); Scott van Breda 78' (1/1); Pen: Gary Van Aswegen 22' (1/1); Cards: Martin Ferreira (yellow card) 33' to 46'; Darron Nell (yellow card) 52' to 62'	Report; Scoreboard	Try: Francois Venter 29'; Sarel Pretorius 44'; Willie du Plessis 60'; Raymond Rhule 71'; Con: Willie du Plessis 30', 45', 61' (3/3); Pieter-Steyn de Wet 72' (1/1); Pen: Willie du Plessis 7', 15', 39' (3/4)	Attendance: 5,988; Referee: Marius Jonker

Cross-Section	20 September 2014	Western Province	36–12	Griquas	Newlands Stadium, Cape Town
	15:00	Try: Justin Geduld 6'; Sikhumbuzo Notshe 16', 59'; Brok Harris 26'; Cheslin Kolbe 84'; Con: Demetri Catrakilis 7', 17', 27' (3/4); Kurt Coleman 85' (1/1); Pen: Demetri Catrakilis 21' (1/1)	Report; Scoreboard	Try: Ruaan Lerm 44'; Abrie Griesel 80'; Con: Gouws Prinsloo (0/1); Dean Grant 80' (1/1); Cards: Maks van Dyk (yellow card) 25' to 35'	Attendance: 10,098; Referee: Pro Legoete

Cross-Section	20 September 2014	Blue Bulls	15–26	Sharks	Loftus Versfeld, Pretoria
	17:05	Pen: Jacques-Louis Potgieter 9', 11', 25', 32', 69' (5/6)	Report; Scoreboard	Try: Lwazi Mvovo 39'; S'bura Sithole 49'; Con: Lionel Cronjé 40', 50' (2/2); Pen: SP Marais 14', 16' (2/3); Lionel Cronjé 56', 75' (2/4)	Attendance: 13,716; Referee: Quinton Immelman

=== Round Eight ===
Cross-Section	26 September 2014	Pumas	23–37	Western Province	Mbombela Stadium, Mbombela
	19:00	Try: Justin van Staden 51'; Stefan Watermeyer 54'; Con: Justin van Staden 52', 54' (2/2); Pen: JC Roos 15', 35' (2/4); Justin van Staden 61' (1/1)	Report; Scoreboard	Try: Nizaam Carr 10', 80'; Sikhumbuzo Notshe 39'; Michael van der Spuy 46'; Con: Demetri Catrakilis 11', 40', 47', 81' (4/4); Pen: Demetri Catrakilis 2', 33', 57' (3/3)	Attendance: 6,431; Referee: Jaco van Heerden

Cross-Section	26 September 2014	Free State Cheetahs	22–31	Blue Bulls	Free State Stadium, Bloemfontein
	19:10	Try: Sarel Pretorius 59'; Con: Willie du Plessis 60' (1/1); Pen: Willie du Plessis 21', 31', 34', 50' (4/5); Drop: Willie du Plessis 73' (1/1); Cards: Sarel Pretorius (yellow card) 22' to 32'	Report; Scoreboard	Try: Sampie Mastriet 23', 81'; Grant Hattingh 66'; Con: Jacques-Louis Potgieter 67', 82' (2/3); Pen: Jacques-Louis Potgieter 13', 18', 47', 78' (4/4); Drop: Jacques-Louis Potgieter (0/1); Cards: Jacques-Louis Potgieter (yellow card) 33' to 43'; Paul Willemse (yellow card) 58' to 68'	Attendance: 7,964; Referee: Marius van der Westhuizen

Cross-Section	27 September 2014	Sharks	53–24	Eastern Province Kings	Kings Park Stadium, Durban
	14:00	Try: Lourens Adriaanse 7'; Lwazi Mvovo 19'; André Esterhuizen 23'; Lionel Cronjé 32'; Paul Jordaan 54', 78'; Stephan Lewies 77'; Con: Lionel Cronjé 8', 20', 24', 33', 78', 79' (6/7); Pen: Lionel Cronjé 11', 49' (2/3)	Report; Scoreboard	Try: Paul Schoeman 37'; Shane Gates 43'; Tim Whitehead 52'; Con: Gary van Aswegen 38', 44', 53' (3/3); Pen: Gary van Aswegen 12' (1/1); Cards: Martin Ferreira (yellow card) 17' to 28'	Attendance: 8,718; Referee: Ben Crouse

Cross-Section	27 September 2014	Griquas	8–46	Golden Lions	Griqua Park, Kimberley
	15:00	Try: Carel Greeff 62'; Con: Gouws Prinsloo (0/1); Pen: Gouws Prinsloo 36' (1/3)	Report; Scoreboard	Try: Andries Coetzee 10'; Jaco Kriel 47', 70'; Franco Mostert 55'; Kwagga Smith 67'; Ruan Combrinck 79'; Con: Ruan Combrinck 11', 48', 68', 71', 80' (5/6); Pen: Ruan Combrinck 22', 33' (2/3)	Attendance: 1,200; Referee: Jaco Peyper

=== Round Nine ===
Cross-Section	3 October 2014	Sharks	26–23	Golden Lions	Kings Park Stadium, Durban
	19:10	Try: André Esterhuizen 22'; Con: Lionel Cronjé (0/1); Pen: Fred Zeilinga 36', 39', 46', 48', 53', 60', 73' (7/8); Drop: Lionel Cronjé (0/1); Cards: André Esterhuizen (yellow card) 30' to 41'	Report; Scoreboard	Try: Ruan Combrinck 32'; Stokkies Hanekom 65'; Con: Marnitz Boshoff 33', 66' (2/2); Pen: Marnitz Boshoff 14', 28', 56' (3/3); Drop: Marnitz Boshoff (0/1); Cards: Derick Minnie (yellow card) 68' to 78'	Attendance: 12,437; Referee: Pro Legoete

Cross-Section	3 October 2014	Pumas	6–37	Blue Bulls	Mbombela Stadium, Mbombela
	19:10	Pen: Justin van Staden 14', 21' (2/3)	Report; Scoreboard	Try: Jacques du Plessis 24'; Dean Greyling 49'; Piet van Zyl 66'; Deon Stegmann 79'; Con: Jacques-Louis Potgieter 25', 50', 67' (3/3); Tian Schoeman 80' (1/1); Pen: Jacques-Louis Potgieter 17', 42', 62' (3/4)	Attendance: 5,141; Referee: Jaco Peyper

Cross-Section	4 October 2014	Free State Cheetahs	29–34	Western Province	Free State Stadium, Bloemfontein
	14:00	Try: Willie du Plessis 13'; Joubert Engelbrecht 24'; Lappies Labuschagné 45'; Francois Venter 59'; Con: Willie du Plessis 14', 25', 60' (3/4); Pen: Willie du Plessis 74' (1/2); Drop: Willie du Plessis (0/1)	Report; Scoreboard	Try: Juan de Jongh 17', 40'; Scarra Ntubeni 31'; Kobus van Wyk 78'; Con: Demetri Catrakilis 18', 32', 40' (3/3); Kurt Coleman 79' (1/1); Pen: Demetri Catrakilis 29', 50' (2/2); Kurt Coleman (0/1); Drop: Demetri Catrakilis (0/1); Cards: Juan de Jongh (yellow card) 43' to 53'; Dillyn Leyds (yellow card) 73'	Attendance: 6,350; Referee: Marius Jonker

Cross-Section	4 October 2014	Griquas	45–25	Eastern Province Kings	Griqua Park, Kimberley
	14:30	Try: Marnus Schoeman 7', 58', 65'; Martin Bezuidenhout 32'; Janro van Niekerk 56'; PJ Vermeulen 67', 75'; Con: Gouws Prinsloo 8', 33' (2/2); Dean Grant 59', 66', 68' (3/4); Jacquin Jansen (0/1); Cards: Marnus Schoeman (yellow card) 19' to 29'	Report; Scoreboard	Try: penalty try 18'; Shane Gates 73', 80'; Con: Gary van Aswegen 19' (1/1); Ntabeni Dukisa (0/1); George Whitehead 81' (1/1); Pen: Gary van Aswegen 14', 28' (2/2); Cards: Shane Gates (yellow card) 55' to 66'	Attendance: 1,000; Referee: Stuart Berry

=== Round Ten ===
Cross-Section	10 October 2014	Eastern Province Kings	26–25	Pumas	Nelson Mandela Bay Stadium, Port Elizabeth
	19:10	Try: Tobie Botes 13'; Ronnie Cooke 21'; Paul Schoeman 28'; Scott van Breda 74'; Con: Gary van Aswegen 22', 29', 75' (3/4); Pen: Scott van Breda (0/1); Gary van Aswegen (0/2)	Report; Scoreboard	Try: Frank Herne 36'; Justin van Staden 40'; Stefan Watermeyer 45'; Con: Justin van Staden 37', 40' (2/3); Pen: Justin van Staden 16', 65' (2/2); Drop: JW Jonker (0/1); Cards: Giant Mtyanda (yellow card) 12' to 22'; Roscko Speckman (yellow card) 27' to 37'	Attendance: 4,584; Referee: Marius Jonker

Cross-Section	11 October 2014	Golden Lions	47–7	Free State Cheetahs	Ellis Park Stadium, Johannesburg
	15:00	Try: Jaco Kriel 6'; Derick Minnie 11'; Ruan Combrinck 30'; Warwick Tecklenburg 53'; Howard Mnisi 73'; Akker van der Merwe 76'; Con: Marnitz Boshoff 7', 12', 74', 77' (4/6); Pen: Marnitz Boshoff 23', 64', 68' (3/4)	Report; Scoreboard	Try: Sarel Pretorius 49'; Con: Willie du Plessis 50' (1/1); Drop: Clayton Blommetjies (0/1); Cards: Oupa Mohoje (yellow card) 22' to 32'	Attendance: 12,031; Referee: Stuart Berry

Cross-Section	11 October 2014	Western Province	20–28	Sharks	Newlands Stadium, Cape Town
	17:05	Try: Patrick Howard 20'; Kurt Coleman 26'; Con: Kurt Coleman 21', 27' (2/2); Pen: Kurt Coleman 10', 15' (2/2); Cards: Rynhardt Elstadt (yellow card) 53' to 63'	Report; Scoreboard	Try: S'bura Sithole 1'; Lourens Adriaanse 64'; Con: Lionel Cronjé (0/2); Pen: Lionel Cronjé 17', 36', 44', 47', 54' (5/5); Fred Zeilinga 75' (1/1)	Attendance: 26,744; Referee: Jaco Peyper

Cross-Section	11 October 2014	Blue Bulls	46–12	Griquas	Loftus Versfeld, Pretoria
	19:10	Try: Bjorn Basson 2', 45', 61'; Deon Stegmann 37'; Handré Pollard 74'; Akona Ndungane 79'; Con: Jacques-Louis Potgieter 3', 38', 62' (3/4); Handré Pollard 75', 80' (2/2); Pen: Jacques-Louis Potgieter 20', 28' (2/3)	Report; Scoreboard	Try: Ederies Arendse 11', 30'; Con: Jacquin Jansen 12' (1/2); Cards: Simon Westraadt (yellow card) 36' to 46'; Ryno Barnes (red card) 72'	Attendance: 7,001; Referee: Pro Legoete

=== Semi-finals ===
18 October 2014	Golden Lions	50–20	Sharks	Ellis Park Stadium, Johannesburg
14:30	Try: Howard Mnisi 10'; Jaco Kriel 37'; Ross Cronjé 40'; Akker van der Merwe 62'; Ruan Combrinck 77'; Warren Whiteley 80'; Con: Marnitz Boshoff 40', 63', 78', 81' (4/6); Pen: Marnitz Boshoff 2', 18', 66', 74' (4/4); Drop: Marnitz Boshoff (0/1); Cards: Kwagga Smith (yellow card) 55' to 65'	Report; Scoreboard	Try: André Esterhuizen 49'; Tera Mtembu 68'; SP Marais 71'; Con: Lionel Cronjé (0/1); Fred Zeilinga 68' (1/2); Pen: SP Marais (0/1); Lionel Cronjé 9' (1/1); Drop: Lionel Cronjé (0/1); Cards: Etienne Oosthuizen (yellow card) 26' to 36'	Attendance: 35,558; Referee: Jaco van Heerden

18 October 2014	Western Province	31–23	Blue Bulls	Newlands Stadium, Cape Town
17:00	Try: Cheslin Kolbe 12', 27'; Nic Groom 37'; Con: Demetri Catrakilis 28', 38' (2/3); Pen: Demetri Catrakilis 3', 22', 49' (3/3); Drop: Demetri Catrakilis 74' (1/1)	Report Scoreboard	Try: Dean Greyling 40'; Callie Visagie 79'; Con: Jacques-Louis Potgieter 40' (1/1); Handré Pollard 80' (1/1); Pen: Jacques-Louis Potgieter 17', 42', 46' (3/6); Drop: Jacques-Louis Potgieter (0/1)	Attendance: 29,857; Referee: Pro Legoete

=== Final ===
25 October 2014	Western Province	19–16	Golden Lions	Newlands Stadium, Cape Town
17:00	Try: Jaco Taute 35'; Con: Demetri Catrakilis 36' (1/1); Pen: Demetri Catrakilis 4', 10', 59', 66' (4/4)	Report; Scoreboard	Try: Jaco van der Walt 50'; Con: Marnitz Boshoff 51' (1/1); Pen: Marnitz Boshoff 45', 57' (2/6); Ruan Combrinck 75' (1/2); Drop: Marnitz Boshoff (0/2)	Attendance: 44,505; Referee: Craig Joubert

=== Honours ===
2014 Absa Currie Cup
Premier Division Champions

Western Province
33rd title

== Players ==
=== Player statistics ===
The following table contain points which have been scored in the 2014 Currie Cup Premier Division:

All point scorers
No	Player	Team	T	C	P	DG	Pts
1	Demetri Catrakilis	Western Province	0	30	20	1	123
1	Jacques-Louis Potgieter	Blue Bulls	0	15	31	0	123
3	Ruan Combrinck	Golden Lions	6	20	12	0	106
4	Justin van Staden	Pumas	3	11	21	0	100
5	Willie du Plessis	Free State Cheetahs	2	15	18	1	97
6	Fred Zeilinga	Sharks	1	6	24	0	89
7	Marnitz Boshoff	Golden Lions	0	13	14	1	71
7	Lionel Cronjé	Sharks	1	12	14	0	71
9	Gouws Prinsloo	Griquas	0	3	15	0	51
10	Kurt Coleman	Western Province	1	8	8	0	45
10	Jaco Kriel	Golden Lions	9	0	0	0	45
12	Scott van Breda	Eastern Province Kings	2	8	6	0	44
13	Sarel Pretorius	Free State Cheetahs	7	0	0	0	35
13	Marnus Schoeman	Griquas	7	0	0	0	35
15	Jaco van der Walt	Golden Lions	1	7	3	1	31
16	Juan de Jongh	Western Province	6	0	0	0	30
16	Gary van Aswegen	Eastern Province Kings	0	9	4	0	30
18	Dean Grant	Griquas	1	7	3	0	28
19	Cheslin Kolbe	Western Province	5	1	0	0	27
19	JC Roos	Pumas	0	6	5	0	27
21	Ederies Arendse	Griquas	5	0	0	0	25
21	Shane Gates	Eastern Province Kings	5	0	0	0	25
21	Kobus van Wyk	Western Province	5	0	0	0	25
24	SP Marais	Sharks	3	0	2	0	21
25	Bjorn Basson	Blue Bulls	4	0	0	0	20
25	Rayno Benjamin	Free State Cheetahs	4	0	0	0	20
25	Nizaam Carr	Western Province	4	0	0	0	20
25	André Esterhuizen	Sharks	4	0	0	0	20
25	Stokkies Hanekom	Golden Lions	4	0	0	0	20
25	Sampie Mastriet	Blue Bulls	4	0	0	0	20
25	Franco Mostert	Golden Lions	4	0	0	0	20
25	S'bura Sithole	Sharks	4	0	0	0	20
25	Deon Stegmann	Blue Bulls	4	0	0	0	20
25	Stefan Watermeyer	Pumas	4	0	0	0	20
35	Lourens Adriaanse	Sharks	3	0	0	0	15
35	Renaldo Bothma	Pumas	3	0	0	0	15
35	Andries Coetzee	Golden Lions	3	0	0	0	15
35	Pieter-Steyn de Wet	Free State Cheetahs	0	6	1	0	15
35	Paul Jordaan	Sharks	3	0	0	0	15
35	Derick Minnie	Golden Lions	3	0	0	0	15
35	Tera Mtembu	Sharks	3	0	0	0	15
35	Akona Ndungane	Blue Bulls	3	0	0	0	15
35	Sikhumbuzo Notshe	Western Province	3	0	0	0	15
35	Raymond Rhule	Free State Cheetahs	3	0	0	0	15
35	Paul Schoeman	Eastern Province Kings	3	0	0	0	15
35	Seabelo Senatla	Western Province	3	0	0	0	15
35	Kwagga Smith	Golden Lions	3	0	0	0	15
35	Akker van der Merwe	Golden Lions	3	0	0	0	15
35	PJ Vermeulen	Griquas	3	0	0	0	15
50	Elgar Watts	Free State Cheetahs	1	2	1	0	12
51	Handré Pollard	Blue Bulls	1	3	0	0	11
51	Nico Scheepers	Griquas	0	4	1	0	11
53	Martin Bezuidenhout	Griquas	2	0	0	0	10
53	Clayton Blommetjies	Free State Cheetahs	2	0	0	0	10
53	Tienie Burger	Free State Cheetahs	2	0	0	0	10
53	Ronnie Cooke	Eastern Province Kings	2	0	0	0	10
53	Ruan Dreyer	Golden Lions	2	0	0	0	10
53	Jacques du Plessis	Blue Bulls	2	0	0	0	10
53	Justin Geduld	Western Province	2	0	0	0	10
53	Carel Greeff	Griquas	2	0	0	0	10
53	Dean Greyling	Blue Bulls	2	0	0	0	10
53	Grant Hattingh	Blue Bulls	2	0	0	0	10
53	Patrick Howard	Western Province	2	0	0	0	10
53	Tony Jantjies	Blue Bulls	0	2	2	0	10
53	JW Jonker	Pumas	2	0	0	0	10
53	Siya Kolisi	Western Province	2	0	0	0	10
53	Howard Mnisi	Golden Lions	2	0	0	0	10
53	Lwazi Mvovo	Sharks	2	0	0	0	10
53	Trompie Pretorius	Pumas	2	0	0	0	10
53	Michael Rhodes	Western Province	2	0	0	0	10
53	Corné Steenkamp	Pumas	2	0	0	0	10
53	Jaco Taute	Western Province	2	0	0	0	10
53	Warwick Tecklenburg	Golden Lions	2	0	0	0	10
53	Schalk van der Merwe	Golden Lions	2	0	0	0	10
53	Michael van der Spuy	Western Province	2	0	0	0	10
53	Francois Venter	Free State Cheetahs	2	0	0	0	10
53	Tim Whitehead	Eastern Province Kings	2	0	0	0	10
78	Tian Schoeman	Blue Bulls	0	1	2	0	8
79	Tobie Botes	Eastern Province Kings	1	1	0	0	7
80	Patrick Lambie	Sharks	0	3	0	0	6
81	JW Bell	Pumas	1	0	0	0	5
81	Ulrich Beyers	Blue Bulls	1	0	0	0	5
81	Jacques Botes	Sharks	1	0	0	0	5
81	Willie Britz	Golden Lions	1	0	0	0	5
81	Tonderai Chavhanga	Sharks	1	0	0	0	5
81	Pat Cilliers	Western Province	1	0	0	0	5
81	Robbie Coetzee	Golden Lions	1	0	0	0	5
81	Marius Coetzer	Pumas	1	0	0	0	5
81	Jean Cook	Free State Cheetahs	1	0	0	0	5
81	Ross Cronjé	Golden Lions	1	0	0	0	5
81	Aidon Davis	Eastern Province Kings	1	0	0	0	5
81	Ntabeni Dukisa	Eastern Province Kings	1	0	0	0	5
81	JP du Plessis	Free State Cheetahs	1	0	0	0	5
81	Thomas du Toit	Sharks	1	0	0	0	5
81	Rynhardt Elstadt	Western Province	1	0	0	0	5
81	Joubert Engelbrecht	Free State Cheetahs	1	0	0	0	5
81	Lizo Gqoboka	Eastern Province Kings	1	0	0	0	5
81	Abrie Griesel	Griquas	1	0	0	0	5
81	Siyanda Grey	Eastern Province Kings	1	0	0	0	5
81	Nic Groom	Western Province	1	0	0	0	5
81	Monde Hadebe	Sharks	1	0	0	0	5
81	Brok Harris	Western Province	1	0	0	0	5
81	Frank Herne	Pumas	1	0	0	0	5
81	Dwayne Jenner	Eastern Province Kings	1	0	0	0	5
81	Vincent Koch	Pumas	1	0	0	0	5
81	Jesse Kriel	Blue Bulls	1	0	0	0	5
81	Lappies Labuschagné	Free State Cheetahs	1	0	0	0	5
81	Ruaan Lerm	Griquas	1	0	0	0	5
81	Stephan Lewies	Sharks	1	0	0	0	5
81	Kevin Luiters	Eastern Province Kings	1	0	0	0	5
81	Lionel Mapoe	Golden Lions	1	0	0	0	5
81	Bongi Mbonambi	Blue Bulls	1	0	0	0	5
81	Tian Meyer	Griquas	1	0	0	0	5
81	Giant Mtyanda	Pumas	1	0	0	0	5
81	Martin Muller	Golden Lions	1	0	0	0	5
81	Darron Nell	Eastern Province Kings	1	0	0	0	5
81	Scarra Ntubeni	Western Province	1	0	0	0	5
81	Burger Odendaal	Blue Bulls	1	0	0	0	5
81	Marais Schmidt	Griquas	0	1	1	0	5
81	Hennie Skorbinski	Pumas	1	0	0	0	5
81	Courtnall Skosan	Golden Lions	1	0	0	0	5
81	William Small-Smith	Blue Bulls	1	0	0	0	5
81	Siviwe Soyizwapi	Eastern Province Kings	1	0	0	0	5
81	Roscko Speckman	Pumas	1	0	0	0	5
81	Frikkie Spies	Pumas	1	0	0	0	5
81	Wayne Stevens	Griquas	1	0	0	0	5
81	Francois Uys	Free State Cheetahs	1	0	0	0	5
81	Janro van Niekerk	Griquas	1	0	0	0	5
81	Reynier van Rooyen	Pumas	1	0	0	0	5
81	Michael van Vuuren	Eastern Province Kings	1	0	0	0	5
81	Piet van Zyl	Blue Bulls	1	0	0	0	5
81	Callie Visagie	Blue Bulls	1	0	0	0	5
81	Luke Watson	Eastern Province Kings	1	0	0	0	5
81	George Whitehead	Eastern Province Kings	0	1	0	1	5
81	Warren Whiteley	Golden Lions	1	0	0	0	5
136	Francois Brummer	Griquas	0	0	0	1	3
137	Jacquin Jansen	Griquas	0	1	0	0	2
137	Joshua Stander	Blue Bulls	0	1	0	0	2
–	penalty try	Eastern Province Kings	2	0	0	0	10
* Legend: T = Tries, C = Conversions, P = Penalties, DG = Drop Goals, Pts = Points.

=== Squad Lists ===
The following players have been named in the squads for the 2014 Currie Cup Premier Division:

Blue Bulls

Forwards

- Jacques du Plessis
- Jacques Engelbrecht
- Dean Greyling
- Grant Hattingh
- Nico Janse van Rensburg
- Werner Kruger
- Wiaan Liebenberg
- Bandise Maku
- Bongi Mbonambi
- Morné Mellett
- Jono Ross
- Basil Short
- Deon Stegmann
- Marcel van der Merwe
- Hencus van Wyk
- Callie Visagie
- Paul Willemse
- Did not play:
- Arno Botha
- Irné Herbst
- Frik Kirsten
- Victor Matfield
- Marvin Orie
- Juan Schoeman
- Roelof Smit
- Pierre Spies
- Flip van der Merwe
- Nardus van der Walt
- Jaco Visagie

Backs

- Bjorn Basson
- Ulrich Beyers
- JJ Engelbrecht
- Tony Jantjies
- Jesse Kriel
- Sampie Mastriet
- Akona Ndungane
- Ryan Nell
- Burger Odendaal
- Rudy Paige
- Handré Pollard
- Jacques-Louis Potgieter
- Tian Schoeman
- William Small-Smith
- Joshua Stander
- Jamba Ulengo
- Piet van Zyl
- Jurgen Visser
- Did not play:
- Francois Hougaard
- Travis Ismaiel
- Lohan Jacobs
- Jan Serfontein
- Dries Swanepoel

Coach

- Frans Ludeke

Eastern Province Kings

Forwards

- Tim Agaba
- Thembelani Bholi
- Tom Botha
- David Bulbring
- Steve Cummins
- Aidon Davis
- Albé de Swardt
- Charl du Plessis
- Martin Ferreira
- Lizo Gqoboka
- Simon Kerrod
- Cameron Lindsay
- Charles Marais
- Edgar Marutlulle
- Shaun McDonald
- Darron Nell
- Devin Oosthuizen
- Paul Schoeman
- Steven Sykes
- BG Uys
- CJ van der Linde
- Michael van Vuuren
- Luke Watson
- Stefan Willemse
- Did not play:
- Brenden Olivier
- Dane van der Westhuyzen

Backs

- Tobie Botes
- Ronnie Cooke
- Ntabeni Dukisa
- Shane Gates
- Siyanda Grey
- Jaco Grobler
- Dwayne Jenner
- Kevin Luiters
- Siviwe Soyizwapi
- Gary van Aswegen
- Scott van Breda
- George Whitehead
- Tim Whitehead
- Did not play:
- Enrico Acker
- Eben Barnard
- Hansie Graaff
- Paul Perez
- Sergeal Petersen
- Marlou van Niekerk

Coach

- Carlos Spencer

Free State Cheetahs

Forwards

- Dolph Botha
- Tienie Burger
- Neil Claassen
- Jean Cook
- Luan de Bruin
- Lood de Jager
- Brendon Groenewald
- Vince Jobo
- Lappies Labuschagné
- AJ le Roux
- Hercú Liebenberg
- Werner Lourens
- George Marich
- Oupa Mohojé
- Trevor Nyakane
- Caylib Oosthuizen
- Coenie Oosthuizen
- Boom Prinsloo
- Bees Roux
- Kevin Stevens
- Francois Uys
- Torsten van Jaarsveld
- Henco Venter
- Waltie Vermeulen
- Carl Wegner
- Did not play:
- Peet Coetzee
- Jacques du Toit
- Freddy Ngoza
- Adriaan Strauss

Backs

- Rayno Benjamin
- Clayton Blommetjies
- AJ Coertzen
- Pieter-Steyn de Wet
- Maphutha Dolo
- JP du Plessis
- Willie du Plessis
- Joubert Engelbrecht
- Sarel Pretorius
- Raymond Rhule
- Francois Venter
- Shaun Venter
- Elgar Watts
- Did not play:
- Renier Botha
- Cornal Hendricks
- Verner Horn
- Henry Immelman
- Cameron Jacobs
- Tertius Kruger
- Willie le Roux
- Nico Lee
- Marco Mason

Coach

- Rory Duncan

Golden Lions

Forwards

- Willie Britz
- Robbie Coetzee
- Ruan Dreyer
- Jaco Kriel
- MB Lusaseni
- Malcolm Marx
- Derick Minnie
- Franco Mostert
- Martin Muller
- Julian Redelinghuys
- Kwagga Smith
- Warwick Tecklenburg
- Akker van der Merwe
- Schalk van der Merwe
- Jacques van Rooyen
- Chris van Zyl
- Willie Wepener
- Warren Whiteley
- Did not play:
- Fabian Booysen
- Cyle Brink
- Stephan de Wit
- Lambert Groenewald
- Ruaan Lerm
- Tyson Mulamba
- Mark Pretorius
- Dylan Smith
- Schalk van Heerden

Backs

- Marnitz Boshoff
- Andries Coetzee
- Ruan Combrinck
- Guy Cronjé
- Ross Cronjé
- Stokkies Hanekom
- Alwyn Hollenbach
- Lionel Mapoe
- Howard Mnisi
- Mark Richards
- Ricky Schroeder
- Courtnall Skosan
- Jaco van der Walt
- Harold Vorster
- Did not play:
- Michael Bondesio
- Robert de Bruyn
- Lloyd Greeff
- Deon Helberg
- Lohan Jacobs
- Ruhan Nel
- Deon van Rensburg
- Anthony Volmink
- Vainon Willis

Coach

- Johan Ackermann

Griquas

Forwards

- Jonathan Adendorf
- Ryno Barnes
- Martin Bezuidenhout
- Wesley Cloete
- Carel Greeff
- Hugo Kloppers
- Ruaan Lerm
- RJ Liebenberg
- Hilton Lobberts
- Jaco Nepgen
- Steph Roberts
- Burger Schoeman
- Marnus Schoeman
- Boela Serfontein
- Ewald van der Westhuizen
- Maks van Dyk
- Janro van Niekerk
- Wendal Wehr
- Simon Westraadt
- Did not play:
- Stephan Greeff
- Luxolo Koza
- Justin Pappin
- Stephan Pretorius

Backs

- Ederies Arendse
- Francois Brummer
- Danie Dames
- Johnathan Francke
- Dean Grant
- Abrie Griesel
- Jacquin Jansen
- Rocco Jansen
- Dustin Jinka
- Doppies la Grange
- Niel Marais
- Tian Meyer
- Gouws Prinsloo
- Nico Scheepers
- Marais Schmidt
- Wayne Stevens
- Rudi van Rooyen
- PJ Vermeulen
- Did not play:
- Logan Basson
- Howard Mnisi
- Sandile Ngcobo
- Reohn van Zyl

Coach

- Hawies Fourie

Sharks

Forwards

- Lourens Adriaanse
- JC Astle
- Jacques Botes
- Dale Chadwick
- Kyle Cooper
- Thomas du Toit
- Monde Hadebe
- Wiehan Hay
- Francois Kleinhans
- Stephan Lewies
- Khaya Majola
- Franco Marais
- Johan Meyer
- Danie Mienie
- Tera Mtembu
- Etienne Oosthuizen
- Matt Stevens
- Marco Wentzel
- Did not play:
- Willem Alberts
- Marcell Coetzee
- Bismarck du Plessis
- Jannie du Plessis
- Pieter-Steph du Toit
- Ryan Kankowski
- Tendai Mtawarira

Backs

- Tonderai Chavhanga
- Lionel Cronjé
- André Esterhuizen
- Conrad Hoffmann
- Paul Jordaan
- Patrick Lambie
- SP Marais
- Lwazi Mvovo
- Odwa Ndungane
- Cobus Reinach
- S'bura Sithole
- Tim Swiel
- Jaco van Tonder
- Hanco Venter
- Heimar Williams
- Cameron Wright
- Fred Zeilinga
- Did not play:
- Tyler Fisher
- Sizo Maseko
- JP Pietersen
- François Steyn
- Stefan Ungerer

Coach

- Brad McLeod-Henderson

Pumas

Forwards

- Renaldo Bothma
- Jaco Bouwer
- Uzair Cassiem
- Marius Coetzer
- François du Toit
- Corné Fourie
- Frank Herne
- RW Kember
- Vincent Koch
- Giant Mtyanda
- Brian Shabangu
- Frikkie Spies
- Corné Steenkamp
- De-Jay Terblanche
- Did not play:
- JJ Breet
- Stephan Kotzé
- Doppies le Roux
- Rudi Mathee
- Jacques Momberg
- Sabelo Nhlapo
- Justin Pappin
- Pieter Stemmet
- Drew van Coller
- Eduan van der Walt

Backs

- JW Bell
- Dylon Frylinck
- Ruwellyn Isbell
- JW Jonker
- Sino Nyoka
- Trompie Pretorius
- JC Roos
- Hennie Skorbinski
- Roscko Speckman
- Heinrich Steyl
- Reynier van Rooyen
- Justin van Staden
- Coenie van Wyk
- Stefan Watermeyer
- Did not play:
- Bernado Botha
- Faf de Klerk
- Johan Herbst
- Wilmaure Louw
- Michael Nienaber
- Dewald Pretorius
- Marcello Sampson
- Deon Scholtz
- Ashwin Scott

Coach

- Jimmy Stonehouse

Western Province

Forwards

- Justin Ackerman
- Gavin Annandale
- Ruan Botha
- Manuel Carizza
- Nizaam Carr
- Pat Cilliers
- Stephan Coetzee
- Rynhardt Elstadt
- Eben Etzebeth
- Gerbrandt Grobler
- Brok Harris
- Oli Kebble
- Rohan Kitshoff
- Jean Kleyn
- Siya Kolisi
- Tiaan Liebenberg
- Frans Malherbe
- Sikhumbuzo Notshe
- Scarra Ntubeni
- Pat O'Brien
- Neil Rautenbach
- Michael Rhodes
- Jurie van Vuuren
- Anton van Zyl
- Alistair Vermaak
- Did not play:
- Tazz Fuzani
- Steven Kitshoff
- Rayn Smid
- De Kock Steenkamp
- Duane Vermeulen

Backs

- Demetri Catrakilis
- Kurt Coleman
- Juan de Jongh
- Robert du Preez
- Justin Geduld
- Nic Groom
- Patrick Howard
- Cheslin Kolbe
- Dillyn Leyds
- Godlen Masimla
- Louis Schreuder
- Seabelo Senatla
- Jaco Taute
- Michael van der Spuy
- Kobus van Wyk
- EW Viljoen
- Devon Williams
- Did not play:
- Willy Ambaka
- Damian de Allende
- Jean de Villiers
- Ryno Eksteen
- Chevandré van Schoor

Coach

- Allister Coetzee

== See also ==
- 2014 Currie Cup First Division
- 2014 Vodacom Cup
