= Rheon =

Rheon is both a surname and a given Welsh name. Notable people with the name include:

- Iwan Rheon (born 1985), Welsh actor, singer, narrator, and musician
- Rheon James (born 1992), Welsh rugby union player
