= Frikkie Spies =

South African rugby union player

- Full name: Frederik Albertus Spies
- Born: 8 February 1985 (age 41) Odendaalsrus, South Africa
- Height: 1.96 m (6 ft 5 in)
- Weight: 120 kg (18 st 13 lb; 265 lb)
- School: Afrikaans High, Kroonstad
- University: University of the Free State
- Occupation: Teacher at Macau Anglican College

Rugby union career
- Position: Lock
Youth career
- 2004–2006: Golden Lions
Senior career
Years	Team	Apps	(Points)
2005	Golden Lions	1	(0)
2006	Free State Cheetahs	6	(0)
2007	Golden Lions	6	(0)
2008–2009	Boland Cavaliers	22	(0)
2010–2012	Griquas	36	(20)
2012–2013	Tarbes	16	(10)
2013–2014	Périgueux	17	(5)
2014–2015	Pumas	11	(10)
- Correct as of 31 May 2015

Frederik Albertus Spies (born 8 February 1985 in Odendaalsrus, South Africa) is a South African rugby union footballer. His regular playing position is lock.

== Rugby career ==
He currently plays for the Pumas in the Currie Cup, having previously played for the Golden Lions, Free State Cheetahs, Boland Cavaliers, Griquas and then had two seasons in France with Pro D2 side Tarbes in 2012–13 and Fédérale 1 side Périgueux in 2013–14.

He returned to South Africa to join the Pumas on a two-year contract prior to the 2014 Currie Cup Premier Division season. He was a member of the Pumas side that won the Vodacom Cup for the first time in 2015, beating Western Province 24–7 in the final. Spies made three appearances during the season, scoring one try.
