= Janro van Niekerk =

South African rugby union player

- Full name: Johannes Lambrechts van Niekerk
- Born: 5 November 1982 (age 44) Worcester, South Africa
- Height: 1.82 m (5 ft 11 1/2 in)
- Weight: 115 kg (18 st 2 lb; 254 lb)
- School: Paarl Boys' High School
- University: Cape Peninsula University of Technology

Rugby union career
- Position: Loosehead Prop
Youth career
- 2002–2003: Blue Bulls
Senior career
Years	Team	Apps	(Points)
2006–2011	Boland Cavaliers	106	(25)
2012–2014	Griquas	36	(25)
- Correct as of 11 October 2014
International career
Years	Team	Apps	(Points)
2008	Emerging Springboks	3	(0)
- Correct as of 12 June 2014

Johannes Lambrechts "Janro" van Niekerk (born 5 November 1982) is a South African rugby union footballer. His regular playing position is loosehead prop. He represented Boland Cavaliers between 2006 and 2011 and Griquas between 2012 and 2014.

After Van Niekerk's Griquas contract expired at the conclusion of the 2014 Currie Cup Premier Division, Van Niekerk moved back to Paarl to pursue a work opportunity.
