= Corné Steenkamp =

South African rugby union player

- Full name: Cornelius Jakobus Steenkamp
- Born: 20 February 1982 (age 44) Ermelo, South Africa
- Height: 1.82 m (5 ft 11 1/2 in)
- Weight: 98 kg (15 st 6 lb; 216 lb)
- School: Ermelo High School

Rugby union career
- Position: Flanker
- Current team: Pumas
Youth career
- 2000–2002: Leicester Tigers
Senior career
Years	Team	Apps	(Points)
2005–2014	Pumas	159	(170)
2005–2014	Total	159	(170)
- Correct as of 10 September 2014

Cornelius Jakobus Steenkamp (born 20 February 1982) is a former South African rugby union player who made in excess of 150 appearances for the Pumas in the Vodacom Cup and Currie Cup competitions.

He retired as a player at the end of 2014 to take over at the Pumas' forwards and conditioning coach.

== Rugby career ==
Steenkamp was a member of the Leicester Tigers youth system before returning to his native South Africa, where he has been playing for the Pumas since 2005. In their opening match of the 2014 Currie Cup Premier Division season, a 28–21 victory over the Free State Cheetahs, Steenkamp made his 150th appearance for the Nelspruit-based side and marked the occasion by scoring a first-half try for his side.
