= George Marich =

South African rugby union player

- Born: 11 July 1992 (age 34) Kroonstad, South Africa
- Height: 1.83 m (6 ft 0 in)
- Weight: 120 kg (18 st 13 lb; 265 lb)
- School: Die Afrikaanse Hoërskool Kroonstad

Rugby union career
- Position: Tighthead prop
Youth career
- 2010–2011: Griffons
Amateur team(s)
Years	Team	Apps	(Points)
2012, 2016–2017	CUT Ixias	6	(0)
Senior career
Years	Team	Apps	(Points)
2012–2013	Narbonne	8	(0)
2013–2014	Castres	0	(0)
2014	Free State Cheetahs	8	(0)
2015	Free State XV	1	(0)
2016	Griffons	7	(0)
- Correct as of 9 October 2016

George Marich (born 11 July 1992 in Kroonstad, South Africa) is a South African rugby union player who last played with the Griffons. His regular position is tighthead prop.

== Career ==
=== Youth and Varsity Shield rugby ===
Marich played his high school rugby for Kroonstad-based high school Die Afrikaanse Hoërskool Kroonstad (Rooiskool). In 2010, while still at school, he was included in the Griffons U19 side that played in the 2010 Under-19 Provincial Championship, making five appearances. Still eligible for the U19s in 2011, he started all eight of their matches during the 2011 Under-19 Provincial Championship, helping the Griffons U19 win Group B, the second tier of this competition, beating Border U19 21–10 in the final in Wellington. He also played in the subsequent promotion/relegation match against SWD U19 as the Griffons lost 18–14 and failed to win promotion to Group A.

In 2012, he was a member of the CUT Ixias squad that played in the 2012 Varsity Shield competition. He was an unused substitute in two matches, against UKZN Impi and UFH Blues.

=== Narbonne / Castres ===
Marich then moved to France to join French Rugby Pro D2 side Narbonne for the 2012–13 Rugby Pro D2 season. He made his first class debut for them in the Round One match against Pau, but could not prevent them suffering a 13–17 defeat. In total, he made eight appearances for the side during the 2012–13 season, all of them coming off the bench, as he helped Narbonne finish in 9th place in the league.

He then joined Top 14 side Castres for the 2013–14 Top 14 season. However, he didn't make any first team appearances for them during the season.

=== Free State Cheetahs ===
He returned to South Africa and, after training with Bloemfontein-based side the Free State Cheetahs for a few weeks, he was named on the bench for their 2014 Currie Cup Premier Division Round Three match against the Sharks.
