= Michael van Vuuren =

South African rugby union player

- Full name: Michael Thomas van Vuuren
- Born: 28 September 1991 (age 35) East London, South Africa
- Height: 1.88 m (6 ft 2 in)
- Weight: 115 kg (18 st 2 lb; 254 lb)
- School: Grey High School. Port Elizabeth
- University: University of the Free State / UNISA

Rugby union career
- Position: Hooker
Youth career
- 2009: Eastern Province Kings
- 2010–2011: Free State Cheetahs
- 2012–2014: Stade Français
Amateur team(s)
Years	Team	Apps	(Points)
2012	UFS Shimlas	2	(0)
Senior career
Years	Team	Apps	(Points)
2011–2012	Free State Cheetahs	15	(5)
2012–2014	Stade Français	20	(10)
2014–2015	Eastern Province Kings	10	(5)
2015–2016	Leicester Tigers	3	(0)
2016–2019	Bath	21	(0)
2016–2017	→ London Scottish (loan)	2	(5)
2019	→ London Irish (loan)	3	(10)
2019–2020	Northampton Saints	9	(0)
2019	→ Bedford Blues (loan)	1	(0)
2020	→ Ampthill (loan)	4	(5)
2020–2021	Ealing Trailfinders	6	(5)
2021–2022	Wasps	11	(15)
2022–2023	Lions	6	(0)
2023	Golden Lions	5	(15)
2023–2024	Newcastle Falcons	10	(5)
2011–2024	Total	126	(80)
- Correct as of 9 April 2025
International career
Years	Team	Apps	(Points)
2011	South Africa Under-20	5	(0)
- Correct as of 10 January 2014
Coaching career
- Years: Team
- 2024-: Alnwick RFC (Head Coach)

Michael Thomas van Vuuren (born 28 September 1991) is an English qualified, South African rugby union footballer. His regular playing position is hooker.

== Career ==
=== Youth and Varsity rugby ===
He was schooled at Grey High School in Port Elizabeth and matriculated in 2009. He played in the Grey first team in 2008 and 2009, alongside Siya Kolisi who is also an Old Grey. He has also played Varsity Cup rugby for UFS Shimlas in the 2012 Varsity Cup.

=== Free State Cheetahs ===
He represented the Free State Cheetahs in the Currie Cup and Vodacom Cup in 2011 and 2012.

=== Stade Français ===
Van Vuuren joined French Top 14 side Stade Français ahead of the 2012–13 Top 14 season, signing a two-year deal until June 2014.

He made his debut for Stade Français Paris in the French Top 14 as a replacement against Biarritz on 4 May 2013.

=== Eastern Province Kings ===
Van Vuuren returned to South Africa to join Port Elizabeth-based side Eastern Province Kings prior to the 2014 Currie Cup Premier Division. He was named on the bench for the Eastern Province Kings' Round Three match against the Blue Bulls in Pretoria. He had an eventful debut for the EP Kings as he came off the bench shortly after half-time, was sent to the sin bin within ten minutes of coming on and scored a try just after his return to the field.

Van Vuuren left the Eastern Province Kings in December; financial problems and non-payment of salaries at the Eastern Province Rugby Union resulted in all players being given the option to terminate their contracts and Van Vuuren exercised this option, announcing that he would leave the side and seek legal advice regarding the unpaid salaries.

=== Leicester Tigers ===
Shortly after leaving the Eastern Province Kings, Van Vuuren joined Leicester Tigers for a month-long trial period, and represented Leicester Tigers A in the Aviva A League. Van Vuuren extended his stay at Welford Road until mid-March 2016 and made his debut for the Leicester Tigers in the English Premiership in a 47–20 home win against London Irish on 28 February 2016.

=== Bath ===
Van Vuuren joined Bath prior to the 2016–17 English Premiership season. Van Vuuren made his debut for the club against Section Paloise on 15 October 2016.

Van Vuuren played 4 games and 104 minutes in the 2017/2018 season for Bath Rugby

=== London Scottish ===
Van Vuuren joined London Scottish on loan for a single match in the 2016–17 RFU Championship, and again joined the team on loan in September 2017.

=== Northampton Saints ===
Van Vuuren joined Northampton Saints ahead of the 2019/20 season.

=== Ealing Trailfinders ===
He joined RFU Championship side Ealing Trailfinders ahead of the 2020–21 season.

=== Representative rugby ===
Van Vuuren was a member of the South Africa Under-20 team that competed in the 2011 IRB Junior World Championship.
