= 2011 IRB Junior World Championship =

Tournament details
- Host: Italy
- Date: June 10–26, 2011
- Teams: 12

Final positions
- Champions: New Zealand
- Runner-up: England
- Third place: Australia

Tournament statistics
- Matches played: 30
- Top scorer(s): (New Zealand) Gareth Anscombe (84 points)
- Most tries: (South Africa) Arno Botha (New Zealand) Charles Piutau (South Africa) Francois Venter (6 tries)

The 2011 IRB Junior World Championship was the fourth annual international rugby union competition for Under 20 national teams, this competition replaced the now defunct under 19 and under 21 world championships. The event was organised by rugby's governing body, the International Rugby Board (IRB). The winners were New Zealand, who won all the competitions held since the inaugural year in 2008.

== Venues ==
Four stadia will be used for this world cup. There will be four double header match days at the three smaller venues with the final to be played in Stadio Euganeo.

| City | Ground | Capacity |
|---|---|---|
| Rovigo | Stadio Comunale Mario Battaglini | 5,000 |
| Treviso | Stadio Comunale di Monigo | 6,700 |
| Padova | Stadio Plebiscito | 9,600 |
| Padova | Stadio Euganeo | 32,336 |

== Teams ==
| Pool | Team | Number of tournaments | Position last year | Position this year | Notes |
|---|---|---|---|---|---|
| A | New Zealand | 3 | 1 | 1 | Champions |
| A | Argentina | 3 | 6 | 9 | |
| A | Wales | 3 | 7 | 7 | |
| A | Italy | 2 | DNP | 11 | Promoted from 2010 IRB Junior World Rugby Trophy |
| B | Australia | 3 | 2 | 3 | Bronze Medal Winner |
| B | France | 3 | 5 | 4 | |
| B | Fiji | 3 | 8 | 6 | |
| B | Tonga | 3 | 11 | 12 | Relegated to 2012 IRB Junior World Rugby Trophy |
| C | South Africa | 3 | 3 | 5 | |
| C | England | 3 | 4 | 2 | Runners-up |
| C | Ireland | 3 | 9 | 8 | |
| C | Scotland | 3 | 10 | 10 | |

== Pool stage ==
All times are local (UTC+2).

=== Pool A ===
| Team | Pld | W | D | L | TF | PF | PA | PD | BP | Pts |
|---|---|---|---|---|---|---|---|---|---|---|
| New Zealand | 3 | 3 | 0 | 0 | 30 | 204 | 22 | +182 | 3 | 15 |
| Wales | 3 | 2 | 0 | 1 | 12 | 90 | 106 | −16 | 2 | 10 |
| Argentina | 3 | 1 | 0 | 2 | 6 | 50 | 85 | −35 | 0 | 4 |
| Italy | 3 | 0 | 0 | 3 | 1 | 16 | 147 | −131 | 0 | 0 |

10 June 2011
18:10

| Argentina | 8 – 34 | Wales |
| Try: Bollini 29' m Con: Ormson (0/1); Pen: Ormson (1/3) 51' | Report | Try: Morgan 9' c Williams 23' c, 64' c Walker 51' c Con: Morgan (4/4) 10', 23', 41', 64'; Pen: Morgan (2/4) 3', 69' |

Stadio Plebiscito, Padua
Referee: John Lacey (Ireland)

10 June 2011
20:10

| Italy | 7 – 64 | New Zealand |
| Try: Visentin 45'; Con: Palazzani (1/1) 46' | Report | Try: Piutau 3' m, 20' c Scott 14' c Luatua 30' c Saili 38' c Anscombe 55' c Sopoaga 63' c Perenara 69' c Barrett 74' c Con: Anscombe (7/8) 16', 20', 31', 39', 56', 63', 70'; Nathan George (1/1) 75'; Pen: Anscombe (1/1) 12' |

Stadio Comunale di Monigo, Treviso
Attendance: 6,700
Referee: Leighton Hodges (Wales)

14 June 2011
18:10

| New Zealand | 92 – 0 | Wales |
| Try: Cane 1' m, 15' c, 49' c Piutau 7' c, 51' m Sopoaga 18' m, 41' c Whitelock 23' c Luatua 35' c Llewellyn 37' c Perenara 47' c Shields 58' c Robertson 74' c Weber 78' c Con: Anscombe (11/14) 8', 16', 24', 36', 38', 42', 48', 50', 59', 75', 79' | Report |

Stadio Comunale Mario Battaglini, Rovigo
Attendance: 3,500
Referee: Greg Garner (England)

14 June 2011
20:10

| Italy | 3 – 27 | Argentina |
| Pen: Gennari (1/3) 31' | Report | Try: Montero 3' c Masera 61' c Moroni 72' c Con: Ormson (3/3) 4', 62', 73'; Pen: Ormson (2/2) 35', 39' |

Stadio Comunale Mario Battaglini, Rovigo
Attendance: 4,000
Referee: Mathieu Raynal (France)

18 June 2011
18:10

| Italy | 6 – 56 | Wales |
| Pen: Gennari (1/2) 35'; Drop: Campagnaro (1/1) 28' | Report | Try: Young 9' m Jones 31' c Hamilton 38' c Walker 40+4' m Evans 46' c James 53' c Jones 77' c Siggery 80+3' c Con: Morgan (5/8) 32', 47', 54', 78', 80+4'; Pen: Morgan (2/2) 7', 30' |

Stadio Comunale di Monigo, Treviso
Referee: Jonathon White (New Zealand)

18 June 2011
18:10

| Argentina | 15 – 48 | New Zealand |
| Try: Sartori 17' c Cruz Guillemaín 27' m Con: Ormson (1/2) 17'; Pen: Ormson (1/1) 11' | Report | Try: Scott 5' m Saili 6' m, 64' c Llewellyn 13' c Barrett 29' c Pleasants-Tate 39' c Perenara 80' c Con: George (5/7) 14', 29', 39', 64', 80'; Pen: George (1/1) 59' |

Stadio Plebiscito, Padua
Attendance: 6,000
Referee: Neil Paterson (Scotland)

=== Pool B ===
| Team | Pld | W | D | L | TF | PF | PA | PD | BP | Pts |
|---|---|---|---|---|---|---|---|---|---|---|
| France | 3 | 3 | 0 | 0 | 11 | 82 | 51 | +31 | 2 | 14 |
| Australia | 3 | 2 | 0 | 1 | 19 | 129 | 63 | +66 | 3 | 11 |
| Fiji | 3 | 1 | 0 | 2 | 7 | 73 | 92 | −19 | 1 | 5 |
| Tonga | 3 | 0 | 0 | 3 | 5 | 39 | 117 | −78 | 0 | 0 |

10 June 2011
18:10

| Australia | 54 – 7 | Tonga |
| Try: Lucas 8'; Kingston 11'; Enever 20'; Roach 25'; Sitauti 30'; Fainga'a 56'; Butler 64'; Latunipulu 71'; Con: Volavola (5/6) 9', 12', 21', 26', 31'; Lucas (2/2) 65', 72' | Report | Try: Howling 47'; Con: Ahki (1/1) 49' |

Stadio Comunale Mario Battaglini, Rovigo
Attendance: 250
Referee: JP Doyle (England)

10 June 2011
20:10

| France | 24 – 12 | Fiji |
| Try: Taofifenua 21'; Bourgeois 33'; Penalty try 60'; Con: Barraque (3/3) 22', 34', 61'; Pen: Barraque (1/1) 8' | Report | Pen: Rasolea (1/1) 25'; Lalagavesi (3/3) 42', 63', 66' |

Stadio Comunale Mario Battaglini, Rovigo
Attendance: 300
Referee: Neil Paterson (Scotland)

14 June 2011
18:10

| Australia | 50 – 25 | Fiji |
| Try: Bredenhann 5' c Hooper 9' c Butler 16' c Postal 28' m Anderson 40' c Siliva 41' m Woodhouse 52' m Enever 57' c Con: Bredenhann (5/8) 6', 9', 16', 40', 57' | Report | Try: Ratini 10' c Talebula 50' c Mudu 75' m Con: Lalagavesi (2/3) 11', 50'; Pen: Lalagavesi (2/2) 20', 72' |

Stadio Plebiscito, Padua
Attendance: 800
Referee: Francisco Pastrana (Argentina)

14 June 2011
20:10

| France | 27 – 14 | Tonga |
| Try: Delmas 12' m Penalty try 43' c Chateau 55' m Gayraud 72' c Con: Palis (1/2) 43'; Barraque (1/2) 72'; Pen: Palis (1/1) 19' | Report | Try: Ahki 30' c Faeamani 70' c Con: Paraki (2/2) 30', 70' |

Stadio Plebiscito, Padua
Attendance: 1,100
Referee: John Lacey (Ireland)

18 June 2011
18:10

| Fiji | 36 – 18 | Tonga |
| Try: Radradra 5' m Mudu 42' c Radradra 52' c Nalasekata 57' m Con: Lalagavesi (2/4) 43', 53'; Pen: Lalagavesi (3/3) 28', 28', 62'; Talebula (1/1) 66' | Report | Try: Howling 72' c Lavemai 76' m Con: Ahki (1/2) 73'; Pen: Paraki (2/2) 4', 17' |

Stadio Comunale Mario Battaglini, Rovigo
Referee: JP Doyle (England)

18 June 2011
20:10

| Australia | 25 – 31 | France |
| Try: Sitauti 37' c Hooper 40' m Bredenhann 79' c Con: Volavola (2/3) 38', 80'; Pen: Volavola (2/2) 10', 25' | Report | Try: Pujol 4' c Palis 18' c Buttin 26' c Barraque 58' c Con: Barraque (4/4) 5', 19', 27', 59'; Pen: Barraque (1/2) 31'; Drop: Bérard (0/1); Buttin (0/1); Doussain (0/1) |

Stadio Comunale di Monigo, Treviso
Referee: Jaco Peyper (South Africa)

=== Pool C ===
| Team | Pld | W | D | L | TF | PF | PA | PD | BP | Pts |
|---|---|---|---|---|---|---|---|---|---|---|
| England | 3 | 3 | 0 | 0 | 12 | 98 | 63 | +35 | 2 | 14 |
| South Africa | 3 | 2 | 0 | 1 | 10 | 95 | 52 | +43 | 3 | 11 |
| Ireland | 3 | 1 | 0 | 2 | 6 | 81 | 88 | −7 | 0 | 4 |
| Scotland | 3 | 0 | 0 | 3 | 3 | 31 | 102 | −71 | 0 | 0 |

10 June 2011
18:10

| England | 33 – 25 | Ireland |
| Try: Short 2'; Thomas 40+3'; Vunipola 61'; Yarde 80+5'; Con: Ford (3/4) 14', 20', 80'; Pen: Ford (2/4) 3', 80+6' | Report | Try: Conway 38'; Con: Jackson (1/1) 49'; Pen: Jackson (6/9) 31', 40+6', 50', 70', 73', 78'; Drop: Jackson (0/1) |

Stadio Comunale di Monigo, Treviso
Referee: Jaco Peyper (South Africa)

10 June 2011
20:10

| South Africa | 33 – 0 | Scotland |
| Try: Venter 14', 43'; Botha 34', 58'; Con: Goosen (2/3) 35', 44'; Beyers (0/1); Pen: Goosen (3/4) 6', 10', 18' | Report |

Stadio Plebiscito, Padua
Referee: Mathieu Raynal (France)

14 June 2011
18:10

| England | 39 – 18 | Scotland |
| Try: Yarde 10' c Wade 37' c, 80+2' c, 80+4' c Mills 70' m Con: Farrell (2/2) 11', 39'; Ford (2/3) 80+3', 80+5'; Pen: Farrell (2/3) 2', 7'; Ford (0/1) | Report | Try: Kennedy 52' c Gossman 73' m Con: Weir (1/1) 53'; Jackson (0/1); Pen: Weir (1/1) 5'; Drop: Weir (1/1) 12' |

Stadio Comunale di Monigo, Treviso
Referee: Leighton Hodges (Wales)

14 June 2011
20:10

| Ireland | 26 – 42 | South Africa |
| Try: Conway 40+1' c, 75' c Con: McKinney (2/2) 40+2', 76'; Pen: McKinney (4/5) 3', 16', 22', 31' | Report | Try: Venter 4' c, 28' c Etzebeth 38' c Mjekevu 68' m Botha 80+3' c Con: Goosen (4/5) 5', 29', 39', 80+4'; Pen: Goosen (2/4) 9', 18'; Drop: Goosen (1/1) 56' |

Stadio Comunale di Monigo, Treviso
Referee: Jonathan White (New Zealand)

18 June 2011
20:10

| England | 26 – 20 | South Africa |
| Try: Daly 7' m Gray 43' m Wade 70' c Con: Ford (0/2); Cook (1/1) 70'; Pen: Ford (3/4) 2', 29', 62' | Report | Try: Carr 25' m Con: Mjekevu (0/1); Pen: Goosen (5/5) 37', 40+1', 49', 65', 78' |

Stadio Plebiscito, Padua
Attendance: 7,000
Referee: John Lacey (Ireland)

18 June 2011
20:10

| Ireland | 30 – 13 | Scotland |
| Try: Conway 70' c Marshall 73' c Annett 75' c Con: Jackson (3/3) 70', 73', 75'; Pen: Jackson (3/5) 1', 23', 52' | Report | Try: Gilmour 79' c Con: Edwards (1/1) 80'; Pen: Weir (2/4) 13', 67' |

Stadio Comunale Mario Battaglini, Rovigo
Attendance: 700
Referee: Greg Garner (England)

== Knockout stage ==
=== 9–12th place play-offs ===
Semifinals
22 June – 18:00 (Rovigo)
Scotland | 30
Tonga | 11
22 June – 20:10 (Rovigo)
Argentina | 12
Italy | 8

9th place
26 June – 12:00 (Rovigo)
Scotland | 14
Argentina | 15
11th place
26 June – 14:10 (Rovigo)
Tonga | 22
Italy | 34

==== Semifinals ====
22 June 2011
18:00

| Scotland | 30 – 11 | Tonga |
| Try: Weir 25' c Hogg 51' c Gossman 73' c Con: Weir (3/3) 26', 51', 73'; Pen: Weir (3/5) 2', 35', 42' | Report | Try: Toumohuni 44' m Con: Ahki (0/1); Pen: Ahki (2/3) 20', 49' |

Stadio Comunale Mario Battaglini, Rovigo
Attendance: 150
Referee: Mathieu Raynal (France)

22 June 2011
20:10

| Argentina | 12 – 8 | Italy |
| Pen: Ormson (4/7) 19', 32', 43', 74' | Report | Try: Visentin 35' m Con: Palazzani (0/1); Pen: Palazzani (1/1) 23'; Drop: Campagnaro (0/1) |

Stadio Comunale Mario Battaglini, Rovigo
Attendance: 1,000
Referee: Leighton Hodges (Wales)

==== 11th place game ====
26 June 2011
14:10

| Tonga | 22 – 34 | Italy |
| Try: Talakai 12' c Afu 21' m, 75' m Vanisi 69' m Con: Hala (1/2) 13'; Paraki (0/2) | Report | Try: Palazzani 2' c Visentin 36' c Penalty try 55' c Castello 62' c Con: Palazzani (4/4) 3', 37', 56', 62'; Pen: Palazzani (2/4) 7', 40' |

Stadio Comunale Mario Battaglini, Rovigo
Attendance: 900
Referee: Greg Garner (England)

==== 9th place game ====
26 June 2011
12:00

| Scotland | 14 – 15 | Argentina |
| Try: Kennedy 26' c Hogg 55' c Con: Weir (2/2) 27', 56'; Pen: Weir (0/2) | Report | Try: Penalty try 15' c Poet 22' m Con: Poet (1/2) 16'; Pen: Poet (1/2) 6'; Ormson (0/1) |

Stadio Comunale Mario Battaglini, Rovigo
Attendance: 600
Referee: Mathieu Raynal (France)

=== 5–8th place play-offs ===
Semifinals
22 June – 18:00 (Padua)
Wales | 20
Fiji | 34
22 June – 20:10 (Padua)
South Africa | 57
Ireland | 15

5th place
26 June – 14:10 (Treviso)
Fiji | 17
South Africa | 104
7th place
26 June – 12:00 (Treviso)
Wales | 38
Ireland | 24

==== Semifinals ====
22 June 2011
18:00

| Wales | 20 – 34 | Fiji |
| Try: Ford 34' c Jones 55' m Shingler 64' m Con: Morgan (1/3) 34'; Pen: Morgan (1/3) 48' | Report | Try: Talebula 30' c, 56' m Sicinilawa 74' c Con: Lalagavesi (2/3) 31', 74'; Pen: Lalagavesi (5/7) 12', 36', 42', 46', 50' |

Stadio Plebiscito, Padua
Attendance: 800
Referee: JP Doyle (England)

22 June 2011
20:10

| South Africa | 57 – 15 | Ireland |
| Try: Du Preez 2' c Mjekevu 8' c, 25' c Botha 13' m Mbovane 28' m, 54' c, 73' c Taute 42' c Venter 70' m Con: Goosen (5/7) 2', 8', 26', 43', 54'; Welthagen (1/2) 73' | Report | Try: McKeon 60' m Jackson 77' c Con: McKinney (1/2) 77'; Pen: McKinney (1/1) 22' |

Stadio Plebiscito, Padua
Attendance: 1,300
Referee: Francisco Pastrana (Argentina)

==== 7th place game ====
26 June 2011
12:00

| Wales | 38 – 24 | Ireland |
| Try: Robling 4'; Cook 22'; Williams 37'; Hill 64'; Young 75'; Con: Morgan (2/5) 65', 75'; Pen: Morgan (3/4) 9', 16', 49' | Report | Try: Conway 12'; Boyle 39'; Henderson 80'; Con: McKinney (3/3) 13', 40', 80'; Pen: McKinney (1/3) 42' |

Stadio Comunale di Monigo, Treviso
Referee: Jonathan White (New Zealand)

==== 5th place game ====
26 June 2011
14:10

| Fiji | 17 – 104 | South Africa |
| Try: Radradra 28'; Lalagavesi 33'; Con: Lalagavesi (2/2) 29', 34'; Pen: Lalagavesi (1/2) 19'; Radradra (0/1) | Report | Try: Mbovane 2', 74'; Mjekevu 5'; Carr 9'; Botha 13' 24', 81'; Venter 16'; Rademan 36', 42'; Taute 55', 79'; Penalty try 58'; Skosan 66'; Jordaan 70'; Kleinhans 72'; Con: Goosen (12/16) 3', 14', 17', 37', 56', 58', 67', 71', 73', 74', 80', 81' |

Stadio Comunale di Monigo, Treviso
Referee: Francisco Pastrana (Argentina)

=== Finals ===
Semifinals
22 June – 18:00 (Treviso)
England | 33
France | 18
22 June – 20:10 (Treviso)
New Zealand | 37
Australia | 7

Final
26 June – 19:10 (Padua)
England | 22
New Zealand | 33
3rd place
26 June – 17:00 (Padua)
France | 17
Australia | 30

==== Semifinals ====
22 June 2011
18:00

| England | 33 – 18 | France |
| Try: Wade 3' m Ford 40' m Ransom 56' c Gray 80+5' c Con: Ford (2/4) 56', 80+6'; Pen: Ford (3/4) 16', 65', 74' | Report | Try: Taofifenua 8' c O'Connor 51' m Con: Barraque (1/2) 9'; Pen: Barraque (2/3) 13', 46' |

Stadio Comunale di Monigo, Treviso
Attendance: 6,700
Referee: John Lacey (Ireland)

22 June 2011
20:10

| New Zealand | 37 – 7 | Australia |
| Try: Saili 7' c Piutau 53' c Anscombe 62' c Weber 80' c Con: Anscombe (4/4) 21', 54', 63', 80+1'; Pen: Anscombe (3/4) 25', 38', 60' | Report | Try: Nasiganiyavi 14' c Con: Volavola (1/1) 15'; Pen: Volavola (0/2) |

Stadio Comunale di Monigo, Treviso
Referee: Greg Garner (England)

==== Third place game ====
26 June 2011
17:00

| France | 17 – 30 | Australia |
| Try: Palis 24'; Come 76'; Con: Barraque (1/1) 24'; Doussain (1/1) 76'; Pen: Barraque (1/1) 4'; Drop: Plisson (0/1) | Report | Try: Kingston 11'; Lucas 19'; Morahan 79'; Con: Volavola (3/3) 12', 21', 80'; Pen: Volavola (3/4) 33', 72', 75' |

Stadio Plebiscito, Padua
Attendance: 9,600
Referee: Leighton Hodges (Wales)

==== Final ====
26 June 2011
19:10

| England | 22 – 33 | New Zealand |
| Try: Wade 6', 58'; Thomas 47'; Con: Ford (2/3) 6', 49'; Pen: Ford (1/3) 35' | Report | Try: Piutau 26'; Tameifuna 40'; Barrett 71'; Con: Anscombe (3/3) 26', 40', 71'; Pen: Anscombe (4/4) 23', 32', 41', 60' |

Stadio Plebiscito, Padua
Attendance: 10,100
Referee: Jaco Peyper (South Africa)

== Statistics ==
=== Top point scorers ===
| Points | Name | Team | Tries | Con | Pen | Drop |
|---|---|---|---|---|---|---|
| 84 | Gareth Anscombe | New Zealand | 2 | 25 | 8 | 0 |
| 79 | Johan Goosen | South Africa | 0 | 23 | 10 | 1 |
| 63 | Josateki Lalagavesi | Fiji | 1 | 8 | 14 | 0 |
| 53 | Matthew Morgan | Wales | 1 | 12 | 8 | 0 |
| 50 | George Ford | England | 1 | 9 | 9 | 0 |
| 40 | Jean-Pascal Barraque | France | 1 | 10 | 5 | 0 |
| 40 | Paddy Jackson | Ireland | 1 | 4 | 9 | 0 |
| 38 | Duncan Weir | Scotland | 1 | 6 | 6 | 1 |
| 37 | Ben Volavola | Australia | 0 | 11 | 5 | 0 |
| 35 | Brian Ormson | Argentina | 0 | 4 | 9 | 0 |

=== Top try scorers ===
| Rank | Name | Team | Tries |
|---|---|---|---|
| 1 | Arno Botha | South Africa | 7 |
| 2 | Charles Piutau | New Zealand | 6 |
| 2 | Francois Venter | South Africa | 6 |
| 2 | Christian Wade | England | 6 |
| 5 | Andrew Conway | Ireland | 5 |
| 5 | Tshotsho Mbovane | South Africa | 5 |
| 7 | Francis Saili | New Zealand | 4 |
| 8 | 9 players | - | 3 |
