= Martin Muller (rugby union) =

South African rugby union player

- Full name: Martin Dirk Muller
- Born: 23 March 1988 (age 38) Cape Town, South Africa
- Height: 1.98 m (6 ft 6 in)
- Weight: 110 kg (17 st 5 lb; 243 lb)
- School: Bishops College
- University: University of Cape Town / University of South Africa

Rugby union career
- Position: Lock
Youth career
- 2006–2008: Western Province
Amateur team(s)
Years	Team	Apps	(Points)
2008–2010	UCT Ikey Tigers	14	(0)
Senior career
Years	Team	Apps	(Points)
2009–2010	Western Province	22	(5)
2009	Stormers	3	(0)
2011–2012	Griquas	23	(5)
2011	Cheetahs	11	(0)
2013	Free State Cheetahs	0	(0)
2014–2016	Golden Lions XV	12	(0)
2014–2016	Golden Lions	20	(5)
2014–2016	Lions	16	(0)
2016–present	Valley RFC		
- Correct as of 25 October 2016
International career
Years	Team	Apps	(Points)
2006	South Africa Schools		
2007	South Africa Under-19		
2008	South Africa Under-20	5	(5)
2009	South Africa Students	2	(0)
2016	Barbarians	3	(0)
- Correct as of 8 November 2016

Martin Dirk Muller (born 23 March 1988) is a retired South African rugby union player, played with Hong Kong Premiership side Valley RFC. His regular playing position is lock.

== Career ==
He represented Western Province at youth level and made his debut for them during the 2009 Vodacom Cup, coming on as a substitute in their match against the Mighty Elephants. Less than two months after his first class debut, he also played his first Super Rugby match for the Stormers in their match against the Chiefs.

In 2010, he moved to Kimberley to join Griquas. After just one appearance, he was included in the Cheetahs Super Rugby team and made eleven appearances for them. He joined the Free State Cheetahs at the start of 2013, but suffered a groin injury and never made an appearance for them.

After it was initially announced that he would join Welsh team Newport Gwent Dragons for 2013–14, the deal fell through and he linked up with the Golden Lions prior to the 2013 Currie Cup Premier Division instead. He didn't recover from injury to feature for them in 2013, but he did make his debut for the Golden Lions in the 2014 Vodacom Cup. After two appearances in that competition, he was elevated to the Super Rugby side, making five appearances during the 2014 season.

Despite media sources reporting that he signed for French side Oyonnax for the 2014–2015 season, Muller remained in Johannesburg and appeared in ten of the Golden Lions' matches of the 2014 Currie Cup Premier Division, including playing in the 2014 Currie Cup.
