= Steph Roberts =

South African rugby union player

- Full name: Willem Andries Stephanus Roberts
- Born: 20 March 1985 (age 41) Bloemfontein, South Africa
- Height: 1.88 m (6 ft 2 in)
- Weight: 118 kg (18 st 8 lb; 260 lb)
- School: Grey College, Bloemfontein
- University: University of the Free State

Rugby union career
- Position: Prop
Senior career
Years	Team	Apps	(Points)
2005–2007	Free State Cheetahs	15	(0)
2008–2016	Griquas	165	(30)
- Correct as of 9 October 2016
International career
Years	Team	Apps	(Points)
2003	S.A. Schools		
2004	South Africa Under-19		
2007	South Africa Students	1	(0)
2009	Highveld XV	1	(0)
- Correct as of 12 June 2014

Willem Andries Stephanus Roberts (born 20 March 1985) is a former South African rugby union footballer whose regular playing position was loosehead prop. He represented the Griquas in the Currie Cup and Vodacom Cup between 2008 and 2016, making 165 appearances, having previously played for the Free State Cheetahs from 2005 to 2007.

He retired at the end of the 2016 season.
