= Jaco Peyper =

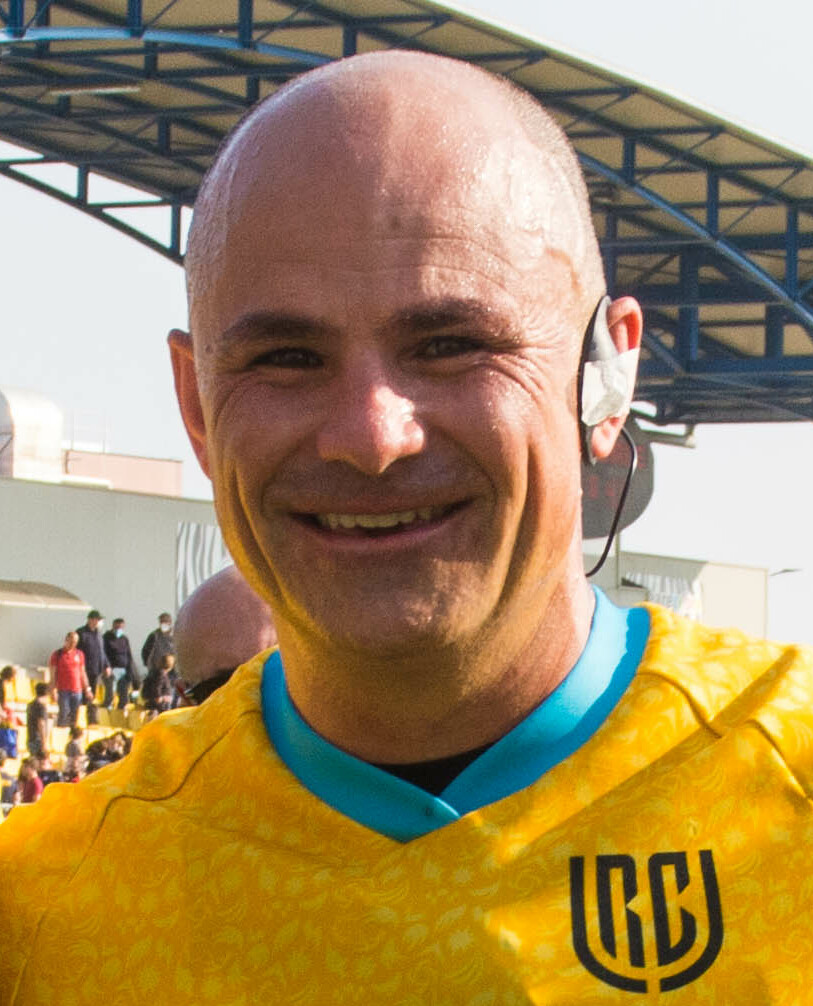
- Born: 13 May 1980 (age 46) Bloemfontein, South Africa

Rugby union career
Refereeing career
Years	Competition	Apps
2011–2024	Test Matches	67
2011–2024	The Rugby Championship	9
2008–2024	Super Rugby	105
2006–2024	Currie Cup	90
2015–2024	Rugby World Cup	14
- Correct as of 22 June 2025

Jaco Peyper (born 13 May 1980) is a former South African Rugby Union referee.

Peyper rose through the ranks in South Africa quickly, making his Super Rugby debut in 2008 while still in his 20s. In 2011 he was named as an official for the 2011 IRB Junior World Championship in Italy. This included the final between England and New Zealand where New Zealand won 33-22.

In 2012, Peyper was promoted to the International Rugby Board's elite panel and was tasked with refereeing Scotland's 2012 tour of Oceania. This included Scotland's 6-9 away win over Australia, 25-37 away win over Fiji and 16-17 away win over Samoa. He was also referee for Argentina v New Zealand clash in Round 5 of the 2012 Rugby Championship.

In 2015, Peyper was selected as one of the twelve referees for the 2015 Rugby World Cup.

In 2019, Peyper was selected as one of the twelve referees and only South African referee for the 2019 Rugby World Cup.

On 20 October 2019, Peyper was the referee for the 2019 Rugby World Cup quarter-final between Wales and France and sent off France's Sébastien Vahaamahina for an elbow. After the match a photograph emerged on social media showing him posing with Wales fans with his elbow on the head of one of the fans and he was not considered for a World Cup semi-final the week after.

Peyper was selected to referee the drawcard opening match of the 2023 Rugby World Cup held on 9 September 2023, between the host nation France and New Zealand. At the time of the match, the two teams had world rankings of 3 and 4 respectively. During the first half of the quarterfinal between Argentina and Wales, Peyper suffered an Achilles injury and could not continue refereeing the match.

On 19 January 2024, one day after withdrawing from that year's Six Nations Championship, Peyper announced his retirement from refereeing. World Rugby chairman Bill Beaumont paid tribute to Peyper, calling him someone who "cares deeply about the game and championing his fellow match officials." Peyper said he would focus on becoming an attorney.
