= Monde Hadebe =

South African rugby union player

- Full name: Monde Sakhile Hadebe
- Born: 9 December 1990 (age 35) Durban, South Africa
- Height: 1.77 m (5 ft 9 1/2 in)
- Weight: 100 kg (220 lb; 15 st 10 lb)
- School: Westville Boys' High School
- University: Sharks Academy / Varsity College

Rugby union career
- Position: Hooker
- Current team: Griquas
Youth career
- 2006–2011: Sharks
Senior career
Years	Team	Apps	(Points)
2011–2015	Sharks (Currie Cup)	56	(10)
2015	Sharks	3	(0)
2020–	Griquas	4	(0)
- Correct as of 3 March 2021
International career
Years	Team	Apps	(Points)
2010	South Africa Under-20	5	(0)
- Correct as of 9 April 2015

Monde Sakhile Hadebe (born 9 December 1990) is a former South African rugby union player, whose regular position is hooker. He played domestic Currie Cup rugby with the Sharks between 2011 and 2015 and Super Rugby with the Sharks in 2015. He retired from rugby in 2016 when he was given a four-year ban following a positive drugs test.

== Playing career ==
=== Youth ===
Hadebe attended Westville Boys' High School and was selected to represent his local provincial union, KwaZulu-Natal at several youth tournaments. He represented them at Under-16 level at the Grant Khomo Week in 2006 and at the Under-18 Craven Week – the premier high school rugby union competition in South Africa – in both 2007 and 2008. In 2008, he was also included in a South African Under-18 southern elite squad after the tournament.

After finishing school, Hadebe joined the Sharks Academy and he made six appearances for the Sharks U19 side during the 2009 Under-19 Provincial Championship.

Hadebe was included in the South African Under-20 squad that played at the 2010 IRB Junior World Championship held in Argentina. He started in all three of their matches in Pool C of the competition; a 40–14 victory over Tonga in the opening match was followed by a 73–0 victory over Scotland, before South Africa suffered their first ever pool stage defeat in the history of the competition, losing 35–42 to Australia. Although finishing in second position in the pool, they still qualified for the semi-finals by virtue of having the best record of the second-placed teams across the three pools. Hadebe started their semi-final match as they were eliminated 7–36 by New Zealand, and also in the third-place play-off, as South Africa beat England 27–22 to secure third position in the competition. Upon the team's return to South Africa, Hadebe made four appearances for the Sharks U21 side during the 2010 Under-21 Provincial Championship.

=== Sharks ===
Hadebe was included for the Sharks XV squad that took part in the 2011 Vodacom Cup competition. He was named on the replacement bench for their opening match of the competition against the Blue Bulls, but failed to make an appearance in his side's 30–19 victory. A week later, he did make his first class debut, playing off the bench in a 25–5 victory over Namibian side the Welwitschias in Windhoek. He was used as a replacement in their regular season matches against the Falcons and the Golden Lions, helping the Sharks XV finish in third place on the Southern Section log to secure a quarter final spot. He didn't feature in their victory over Western Province in the quarter-final, but made his fourth appearance of the campaign in their semi-final match against Argentine side Pampas XV in Potchefstroom. He couldn't prevent the Sharks XV from losing the match 26–41 to be eliminated from the competition by the eventual champions.

In the second half of the year, Hadebe played for and captained the Sharks U21 side during the 2012 Under-21 Provincial Championship. He scored tries in their matches against the Blue Bulls U21s and the Falcons U21s as his side won nine out of their twelve matches during the regular season, finishing in second position on the log. Hadebe also helped the team beat the Western Province U21s in the semi-final, but they fell short in the final, losing 30–46 to the Blue Bulls U21. During the Under-21 Provincial Championship, he was also called up into the senior team that played in the 2011 Currie Cup Premier Division. He made his Currie Cup debut when he played off the bench in the 64th minute of their 29–18 victory over Griquas. He was an unused replacement the following week against Western Province, but made one further appearance against the Leopards in Rustenburg.

After six substitute appearances in 2011, Hadebe made his first start for the Sharks XV during the 2012 Vodacom Cup in their opening-day 42–0 victory over the Border Bulldogs. He appeared in all seven of their matches during the regular season – four starts and three appearances from the bench – as the Sharks XV finished in second position in the Southern Section of the competition. He was named on the bench for their quarter final match against the Blue Bulls, but didn't see any game time as the side from Pretoria won 37–36 to eliminate them from the competition. He made seven appearances for the Sharks during the 2012 Currie Cup Premier Division; after playing off the bench against Western Province and the Golden Lions, he started his first match in the Currie Cup competition, in a 31–42 defeat to the Blue Bulls in Pretoria. Starts against the Free State Cheetahs and Griquas followed, and substitute appearances against Western Province and the Golden Lions. The Sharks finished top of the log, but Hadebe missed out on the play-off rounds, as a 20–3 victory over the Blue Bulls secured them a place in the final, only to lose at the final hurdle to Western Province, going down 18–25 in Durban.

Hadebe was the first choice hooker for the Sharks XV during the 2013 Vodacom Cup, starting all eight of their matches. They finished top of the Southern Section log, but crashed out as the quarter-final stage as they lost to the Golden Lions. As soon as the tournament finished, Hadebe joined the Sharks Super Rugby squad for the 2013 Super Rugby season, linking up with the team during their tour of Australia. He was named on the bench in their matches against the Reds in Brisbane, the Force in Perth and the Bulls upon their return to South Africa, but failed to appear in any of those matches. He was also restricted to just four appearances – all of those as a replacement – for the Sharks during the 2013 Currie Cup Premier Division. It was a successful season for the team, however, as they won their seventh Currie Cup competition, beating Western Province 33–19 in the final.

Hadebe again appeared in all of the Sharks XV's matches in the Vodacom Cup competition in 2014. Their Round Four match against the SWD Eagles saw Hadebe score the first senior try of his career in a 27–10 victory, and the Sharks XV again finished top of the Southern Section log. For the second season in a row they lost in the quarter-finals, with the Golden Lions eliminating them at this stage for the second season in a row. Hadebe didn't feature for the Super Rugby side at all, but made four appearances in the 2014 Currie Cup Premier Division. He came on as a replacement against the Pumas in their second match of the season, scoring his first ever Currie Cup try in the final minutes of a 34–17 victory. He was an unused replacement in three matches, but came on against the Golden Lions in their penultimate match in the regular season and starting their final match against Western Province as the Sharks qualified for the semi-finals after finishing in third position. Hadebe came on as a replacement in their semi-final against the Golden Lions, but could not prevent the side from Johannesburg easily winning the match 50–20.

Hadebe returned to Super Rugby action in 2015; he wasn't used in their match against the Cheetahs, but did appear in matches against the Force, Lions and the Bulls. In addition, he also made four starts for the Sharks XV in the 2015 Vodacom Cup. He was the most-used hooker for the Sharks during the 2015 Currie Cup Premier Division, starting six of their ten matches, and coming on as a replacement in a further two matches.

In November 2015, Hadebe was named in the Sharks training squad for the 2016 Super Rugby season, but then joined the Port Elizabeth-based Southern Kings outfit for a trial period as they prepared for the Super Rugby season. However, he picked up an injury during training and returned to the Durban-based side.

== Drugs ban ==
In July 2016, it was revealed that Hadebe received a four-year ban from the sport after failing a drugs test, banning him from playing rugby at any level until May 2020. He tested positively for two forbidden forms of steroids.

The Sharks released a statement following Hadebe's suspension, announcing that the player retired from professional rugby.

== Career statistics ==
As of 19 January 2016.

First class career
Season	Teams	Super Rugby		Currie Cup		Vodacom Cup		Total	
Season	Teams	Apps	Pts	Apps	Pts	Apps	Pts	Apps	Pts
2011	Sharks	—	—	2	0	4	0	6	0
2012	Sharks	—	—	7	0	7	0	14	0
2013	Sharks	0	0	4	0	8	0	12	0
2014	Sharks	—	—	4	5	8	5	12	10
2015	Sharks	3	0	8	0	4	0	15	0
Sharks Total		3	0	25	5	31	5	59	10
Career Total		3	0	25	5	31	5	59	10
