= Nizaam Carr =

South African rugby union footballer

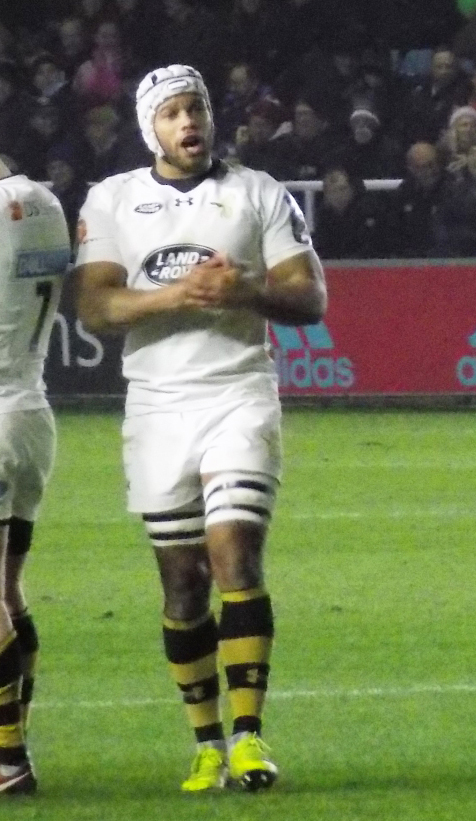
- Born: 4 April 1991 (age 35) Cape Town, South Africa
- Height: 1.78 m (5 ft 10 in)
- Weight: 106 kg (16 st 10 lb; 234 lb)
- School: Diocesan College
- University: University of Cape Town

Rugby union career
- Position: Loose forward
- Current team: Bulls / Blue Bulls
Youth career
- 2007–2012: Western Province
Amateur team(s)
Years	Team	Apps	(Points)
2011	UCT Ikey Tigers	5	(5)
Senior career
Years	Team	Apps	(Points)
2011–2017	Western Province	56	(80)
2012–2018	Stormers	97	(40)
2017	→ Wasps	11	(20)
2018–2020	Wasps	45	(45)
2020–2021	Bulls	8	(0)
2020–2021	Blue Bulls	4	(0)
2021–2022	Wasps	19	(10)
2022–	Bulls		
2023–	Blue Bulls		
- Correct as of 2 November 2022
International career
Years	Team	Apps	(Points)
2011	South Africa Under–20	4	(10)
2014–2016	South Africa	5	(0)
2016	South Africa 'A'	2	(0)
2016	Springbok XV	1	(0)
- Correct as of 18 April 2018

Nizaam Carr (born 4 April 1991) is a South African rugby union footballer who plays as a back rower. He is renowned for his athleticism and linking play.

== Personal life ==
Carr grew up in Mitchell's Plain and attended West End Primary before his father moved to Rondebosch East, where he still lives with his family.

Carr is the first Muslim to be named in a Springboks squad and to play for his national team after his subsequent debut against Italy. He fasts during the Muslim holy month of Ramadan, even while playing rugby. He runs a rugby academy at Islamia College in Lansdowne and hopes to inspire more young players from his community to achieve higher honours in rugby.

== Club career ==
Born in Cape Town, Carr attended Bishops and played in their First XV in 2008 and 2009. Carr made his way through the junior ranks of Western Province, playing Craven Week in 2009 and then made it to the senior team in 2011 where he debuted against the Golden Lions. Impressive outings in a Province jersey somehow saw him called up to the Stormers Super Rugby squad for the 2012 season and he made a total of 7 appearances before a serious knee injury ended his year. However, he bounced back during 2013 and made 14 appearances for the Stormers and also helped Western Province reach the final of the Currie Cup.

Carr started the 2014 Super Rugby season on the bench, but an injury to Siya Kolisi led to him starting the final 11 matches of the Stormers' campaign in the number 6 jersey. He returned to his preferred number 8 position during the 2014 Currie Cup Premier Division, with his team ending the season as champions.

By captaining the Stormers in round 18 of the 2015 Super Rugby season, Carr became the first Muslim to have captained a Super Rugby team.

On 30 October 2017, Carr signed a 3-month deal to join English Premiership side Wasps. He rejoined the team on a full-time basis after the 2018 Super Rugby season.

On 12 June 2020, Carr returned to South Africa to rejoin the Bulls for their next Super Rugby season, after the conclusion of his contract with Wasps.

On 28 June 2021, it was announced that Carr would once again return to Wasps, after the conclusion of his Currie Cup commitments with the Bulls. Wasps entered administration on 17 October 2022 and Carr was made redundant along with all other players and coaching staff. After being made redundant by Wasps, Carr returned to South Africa once again to rejoin the Bulls in the URC competition.

== International career ==
Carr was a member of the South Africa Under 20 team that competed in the 2011 IRB Junior World Championship where he made a total of 4 appearances and scored 2 tries.

In October 2014, Carr was called up by the South Africa national rugby union team for their 2014 end-of-year rugby union internationals. On 22 November, he made his Springbok test debut against the Italy national team.

In 2016, Carr was included in a South Africa 'A' squad that played a two-match series against a touring England Saxons team. He was named in the starting line-up for their first match in Bloemfontein, but ended on the losing side as the visitors ran out 32–24 winners. He was named on the bench for the second match of the series, coming on as a first-half replacement in a 26–29 defeat to the Saxons in George.

== Honours ==
- Currie Cup winner 2014, 2017
- Pro14 Rainbow Cup runner-up 2021

== Statistics ==
As of 21 June 2015

Season	Team	Games	Starts	Sub	Mins	Tries	Cons	Pens	Drops	Points	Yel	Red
2012	Stormers	6	2	4	154	0	0	0	0	0	0	0
2013	Stormers	15	6	9	647	0	0	0	0	0	0	0
2014	Stormers	16	11	5	976	4	0	0	0	20	1	0
2015	Stormers	16	10	6	701	1	0	0	0	5	0	0
Total		53	29	24	2478	5	0	0	0	25	1	0
