= Ruan Dreyer =

South Africa international rugby union player

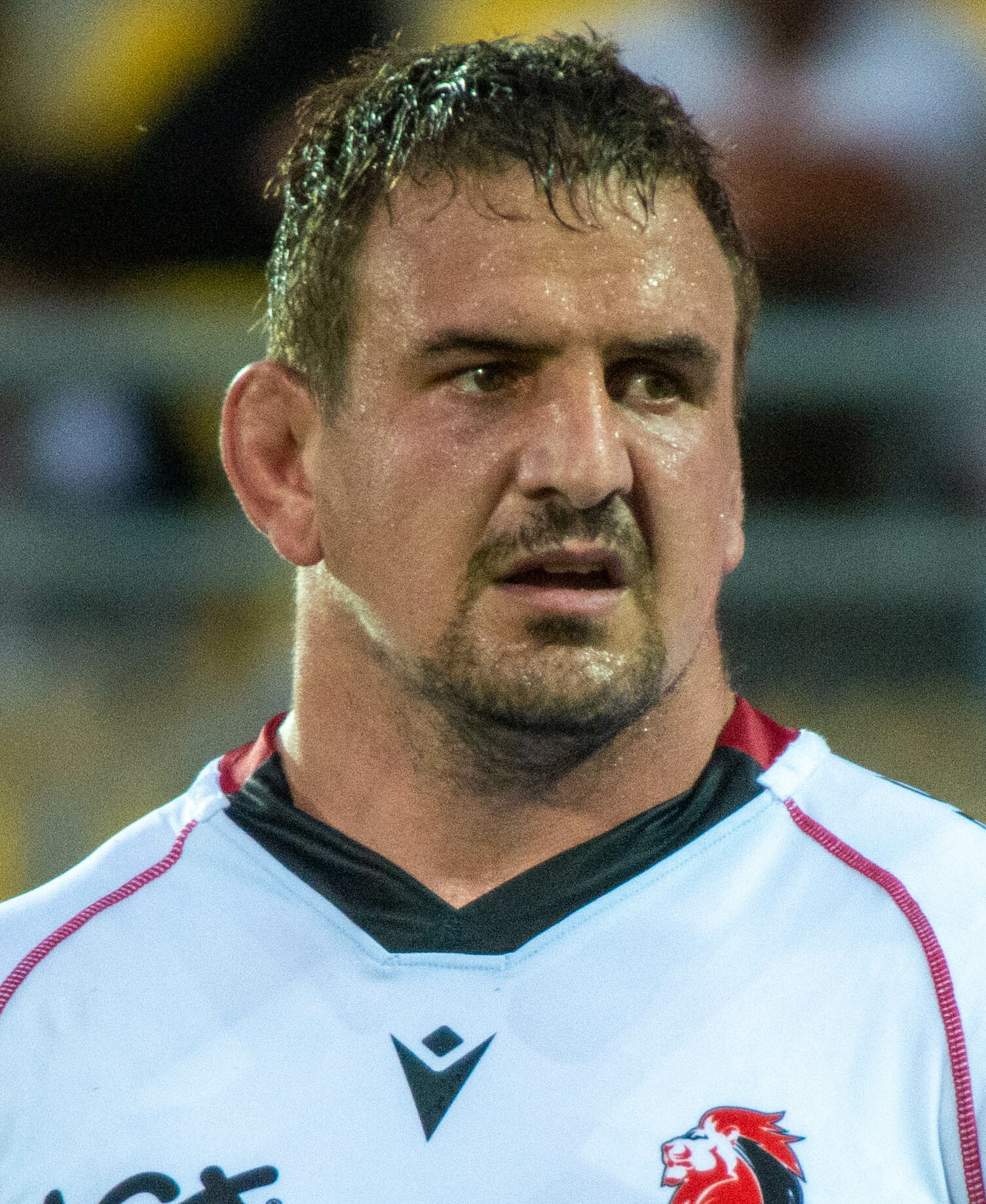
- Dreyer in 2021
- Full name: Ruan Martin Dreyer
- Born: 16 September 1990 (age 36) Potchefstroom, South Africa
- Height: 1.85 m (6 ft 1 in)
- Weight: 115 kg (18 st 2 lb; 254 lb)
- School: Monument High School
- University: University of Johannesburg

Rugby union career
- Position: Tighthead Prop
- Current team: Lions / Golden Lions
Senior career
Years	Team	Apps	(Points)
2010–2013	Golden Lions XV	18	(5)
2012–2018	Lions	78	(20)
2012–2017	Golden Lions	43	(25)
2018–2020	Gloucester	7	(5)
2020–2024	Lions	49	(5)
2020–2024	Golden Lions	23	(10)
- Correct as of 6 August 2024
International career
Years	Team	Apps	(Points)
2010	South Africa Under-20	5	(0)
2016–present	South Africa	4	(5)
- Correct as of 16 April 2018

Ruan Martin Dreyer (born 16 September 1990) is a South African rugby union footballer. His regular playing position is prop. He plays for Lions in Super Rugby.

He was a member of the South Africa Under 20 team that competed in the 2010 IRB Junior World Championship.

He joined Gloucester prior to the 2018–19 English Premiership. It was confirmed in June 2020 that he had left the club.

On 12 July 2020, it was later confirmed that Dreyer returned to his old club Lions for next season.
