= Paul Jordaan =

South African rugby union player

- Full name: Paul Abraham Jordaan
- Born: 4 January 1992 (age 34) Somerset East, South Africa
- Height: 1.80 m (5 ft 11 in)
- Weight: 88 kg (13 st 12 lb; 194 lb)
- School: Grey College, Bloemfontein

Rugby union career
- Position: Centre / Winger
Youth career
- 2005: Eastern Province Kings
- 2008–2010: Free State Cheetahs
- 2011: Sharks
Senior career
Years	Team	Apps	(Points)
2011–2015	Sharks XV	5	(5)
2012–2015	Sharks (Currie Cup)	28	(50)
2012–2016	Sharks	43	(45)
2016–2019	La Rochelle	51	(50)
- Correct as of 30 August 2018
International career
Years	Team	Apps	(Points)
2010–2011	South Africa Sevens		
2011–2012	South Africa Under-20	8	(5)
- Correct as of 18 April 2015

Paul Abraham Jordaan (born 4 January 1992) is a South African rugby union footballer. His regular playing position is either fly-half or centre. He represents La Rochelle in the French Top 14.

He was a member of the South Africa Under 20 team that competed in the 2011 IRB Junior World Championship and won the 2012 tournament.
