= Stokkies Hanekom =

South African rugby union player

- Full name: Nicolaas Johannes Hanekom
- Born: 17 May 1989 (age 37) Citrusdal, South Africa
- Height: 1.93 m (6 ft 4 in)
- Weight: 101 kg (223 lb; 15 st 13 lb)
- School: Paarl Gimnasium

Rugby union career
- Position: Centre
Youth career
- 2008–2010: Western Province
Amateur team(s)
Years	Team	Apps	(Points)
2010–2012	Maties	11	(20)
Senior career
Years	Team	Apps	(Points)
2011	→ Griquas	0	(0)
2011	Western Province	0	(0)
2012	SWD Eagles	14	(25)
2013–2016	Golden Lions XV	23	(55)
2013–2017	Golden Lions	28	(55)
2013–2016	Lions	8	(10)
2017	→ Southern Kings	5	(0)
2017	→ Eastern Province Kings	3	(0)
- Correct as of 17 April 2018
International career
Years	Team	Apps	(Points)
2009	South Africa Under-20	5	(10)
- Correct as of 17 April 2018

Nicolaas Johannes 'Stokkies' Hanekom (born 17 May 1989) is a South African rugby union player who most recently played with the Golden Lions. His regular position is outside centre.

== Career ==
As a pupil at Paarl Gimnasium, he started his career playing for the local team Western Province at the youth level, playing for their Under-19 team in 2008 and their Under-21 team in 2009 and 2010.

In 2009, he was included in the South Africa Under-20 team for the 2009 IRB Junior World Championship.

He had a short spell for Griquas during the 2011 Vodacom Cup tournament but failed to make a first-class appearance, despite twice being named on the bench. He was then included in the Western Province squad for the compulsory friendlies prior to the 2011 Currie Cup Premier Division season but failed to break into the team.

He moved to SWD Eagles for the 2012 Currie Cup First Division season, starting all fourteen games that season.

At the start of 2013, he joined the Lions and was included in their squad for the 2013 Lions Challenge Series, as well as the Golden Lions' 2013 Vodacom Cup squad.
