= Rheon James =

Welsh rugby union player (born 1992)

- Born: Rheon James; 21 September 1992 (age 34) Carmarthen, Wales
- Height: 183 cm (6 ft 0 in)
- Weight: 112 kg (17 st 9 lb)
- School: Ysgol Bro Myrddin

Rugby union career
- Position: Centre
- Current team: Cornish Pirates
Senior career
Years	Team	Apps	(Points)
2010–13	Carmarthen Quins	54	(35)
2013–16	Cornish Pirates	23	(10)
- Correct as of 13 May 2016
Provincial / State sides
Years	Team	Apps	(Points)
2011–13	Scarlets	2	(0)
- Correct as of 13 May 2016
International career
Years	Team	Apps	(Points)
2011	Wales U20	7	(5)
- Correct as of 13 May 2016

Rheon James (born 21 September 1992) is a former Welsh rugby union player who played as a centre.James previously played for Carmarthen Quins, the Scarlets and Cornish Pirates. He is a former Wales U20 international.
