= Jacques du Plessis =

South African rugby union player

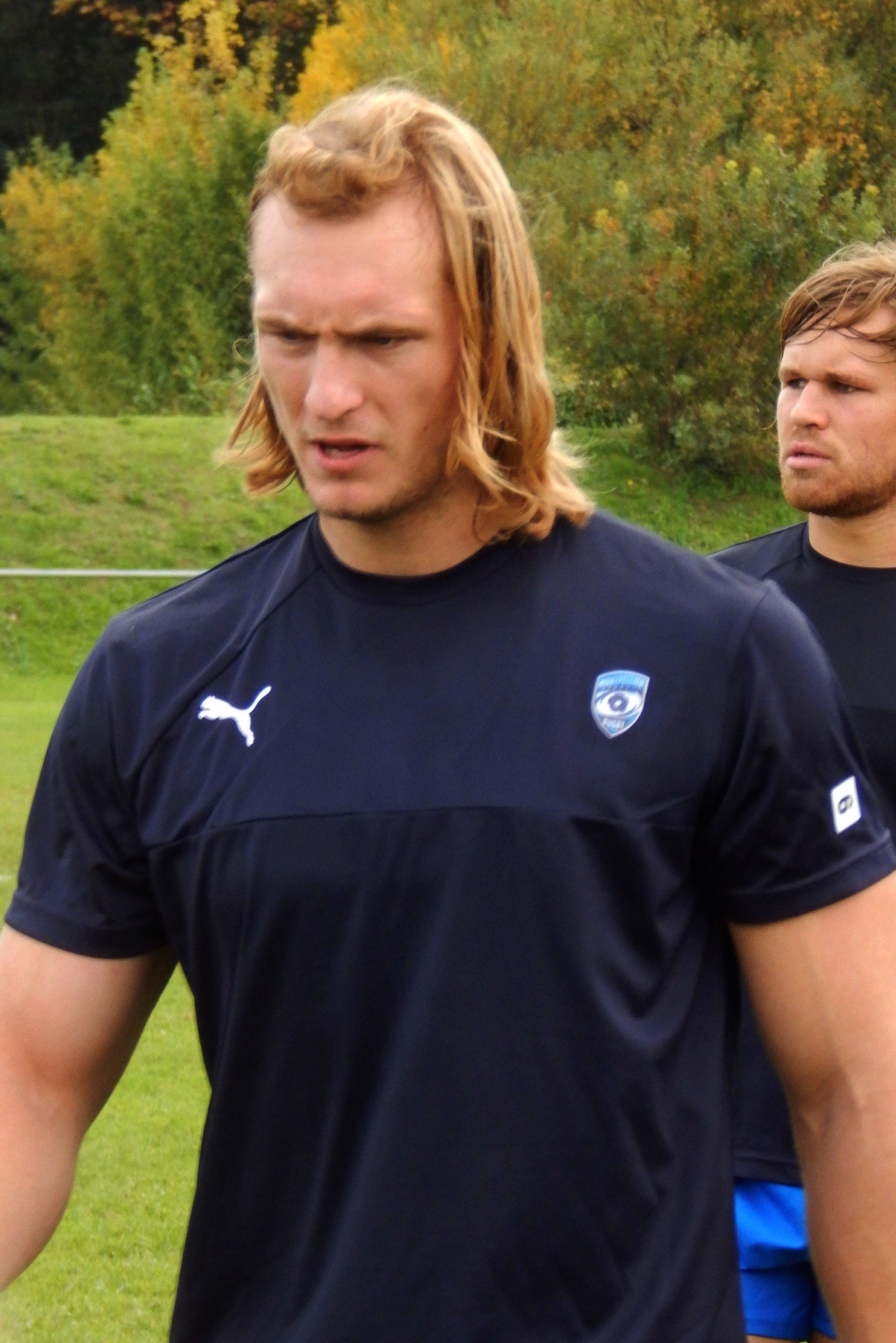
- Full name: Willem Hendrik Jacques du Plessis
- Born: 12 August 1993 (age 33) Pongola, KwaZulu-Natal, Republic of South Africa
- Height: 2.01 m (6 ft 7 in)
- Weight: 119 kg (18 st 10 lb; 262 lb)
- School: Ermelo High School, Ermelo
- University: University of Pretoria

Rugby union career
- Position: Lock / Flanker
- Current team: Bulls / Blue Bulls
Youth career
- 2006: Sharks
- 2009–2011: Pumas
- 2012–2013: Blue Bulls
Amateur team(s)
Years	Team	Apps	(Points)
2013	UP Tuks	3	(0)
Senior career
Years	Team	Apps	(Points)
2013–2015	Blue Bulls	32	(25)
2013–2015	Bulls	31	(10)
2015–2021	Montpellier	105	(55)
2021–	Blue Bulls	3	(0)
2021–	Bulls	4	(0)
- Correct as of 23 July 2022
International career
Years	Team	Apps	(Points)
2011	S.A. Schools		
2013	South Africa Under-20	5	(5)
- Correct as of 1 April 2015

Willem Hendrik Jacques "Sheep" du Plessis (born 12 August 1993) is a South African rugby union player. He plays for the Bulls in the United Rugby Championship and for the Blue Bulls in the Currie Cup. His regular playing positions are flanker or lock.

== Career ==
=== Youth ===
After representing the Sharks in the 2006 Under-13 Craven Week competition, he moved to Ermelo and subsequently represented the Pumas at the 2009 Under-16 Grant Khomo Week and 2011 Under-18 Craven Week tournaments. His performance in the latter tournament led to his selection in the 2011 South African Schools squad.

In 2012, he joined the Blue Bulls and made twelve appearances for them in the 2012 Under-21 Provincial Championship competition.

=== Blue Bulls ===
Du Plessis made his senior debut for the Blue Bulls in 2013, starting in the 110–0 thrashing of the Limpopo Blue Bulls. He also started the game the following week in an equally impressive 89–10 victory against the Griffons, a match that saw him score his first try, dotting down shortly after half-time.

In July 2013, the Blue Bulls announced that he signed a contract extension until 31 October 2015.

=== Bulls ===
In July 2013, Du Plessis was named on the bench for the Bulls' Super Rugby match against the Stormers and came on as a substitute to make his Bulls debut.

Du Plessis was included in the Bulls squad for the 2014 Super Rugby seasonto resign and made his Super Rugby start in a 31–16 defeat to the Sharks in Durban.

=== Montpellier ===
Shortly before the 2015 Super Rugby season, the Bulls announced that Du Plessis would leave after the 2015 Currie Cup Premier Division to take up a two-year contract with French Top 14 side Montpellier.

=== Return to the Bulls ===
On 12 April 2021, Du Plessis has left Montpellier early to return to South Africa with the Bulls.

=== Representative rugby ===
Du Plessis was included the South Africa Under-20 squad for the 2013 IRB Junior World Championship.

In May 2014, Du Plessis was one of eight uncapped players that were called up to a Springbok training camp prior to the 2014 mid-year rugby union tests.

=== Varsity Cup ===
Du Plessis also played some Varsity Cup rugby, representing the UP Tuks in the 2013 Varsity Cup competition.

== Honours ==
- 2015–16 European Rugby Challenge Cup : winner.
- Currie Cup winner (2021)
