= Francois Venter =

South African rugby union player

- Full name: Jacobus Francois Venter
- Born: 19 April 1991 (age 35) Bloemfontein, South Africa
- Height: 1.85 m (6 ft 1 in)
- Weight: 93 kg (14 st 9 lb; 205 lb)
- School: Grey College, Bloemfontein
- University: University of Pretoria

Rugby union career
- Position: Inside-Centre
- Current team: Sharks / Sharks (Currie Cup)
Youth career
- 2007–2009: Free State Cheetahs
- 2010–2012: Blue Bulls
Senior career
Years	Team	Apps	(Points)
2010–2013	Blue Bulls	43	(60)
2012–2013	Bulls	11	(0)
2014–2018	Cheetahs	60	(85)
2014–2018	Free State Cheetahs	29	(55)
2018–2022	Worcester Warriors	77	(40)
2022–2026	Sharks	33	(5)
2023–2026	Sharks (Currie Cup)	3	(5)
- Correct as of 18 December 2022
International career
Years	Team	Apps	(Points)
2008	South Africa Under-18 Elite Squad		
2008	South Africa Schools		
2010–2011	South Africa Under-20	10	(35)
2015	Barbarians	2	(0)
2016–2017	South Africa 'A'	4	(5)
2016	Springbok XV	1	(5)
2016–2017	South Africa	7	(5)
- Correct as of 22 April 2018

Jacobus Francois Venter (born 19 April 1991) is a South African former rugby union player. He usually plays as an inside-centre.

He previously played for the Cheetahs in the Pro14 and the Free State Cheetahs and the Blue Bulls in the Currie Cup.

== Club career ==
In July 2013, it was announced that he would join the Cheetahs prior to the 2014 Super Rugby season on a two-year deal. He was subsequently included in the Cheetahs squad for the 2014 Super Rugby season and made his Cheetahs debut in a 21–20 defeat to the Lions in Bloemfontein.

In March 2018, it was announced that Venter would join English Premiership side Worcester Warriors on a two-year contract from the 2018–19 season. On 5 October 2022 all Worcester players had their contacts terminated due to the liquidation of the company to which they were contracted.

Venter signed for the Sharks following Worcester’s liquidation.

== International career ==
He was a member of the South Africa Under 20 team that competed in the 2010 and 2011 IRB Junior World Championships.

In 2016, Venter was included in a South Africa 'A' squad that played a two-match series against a touring England Saxons team. He was named in the starting line-up for their first match in Bloemfontein, but ended on the losing side as the visitors ran out 32–24 winners. He also started the second match of the series, scoring a try five minutes into the second half of a 26–29 defeat to the Saxons in George.
