= Rynhardt Elstadt =

South African rugby union player

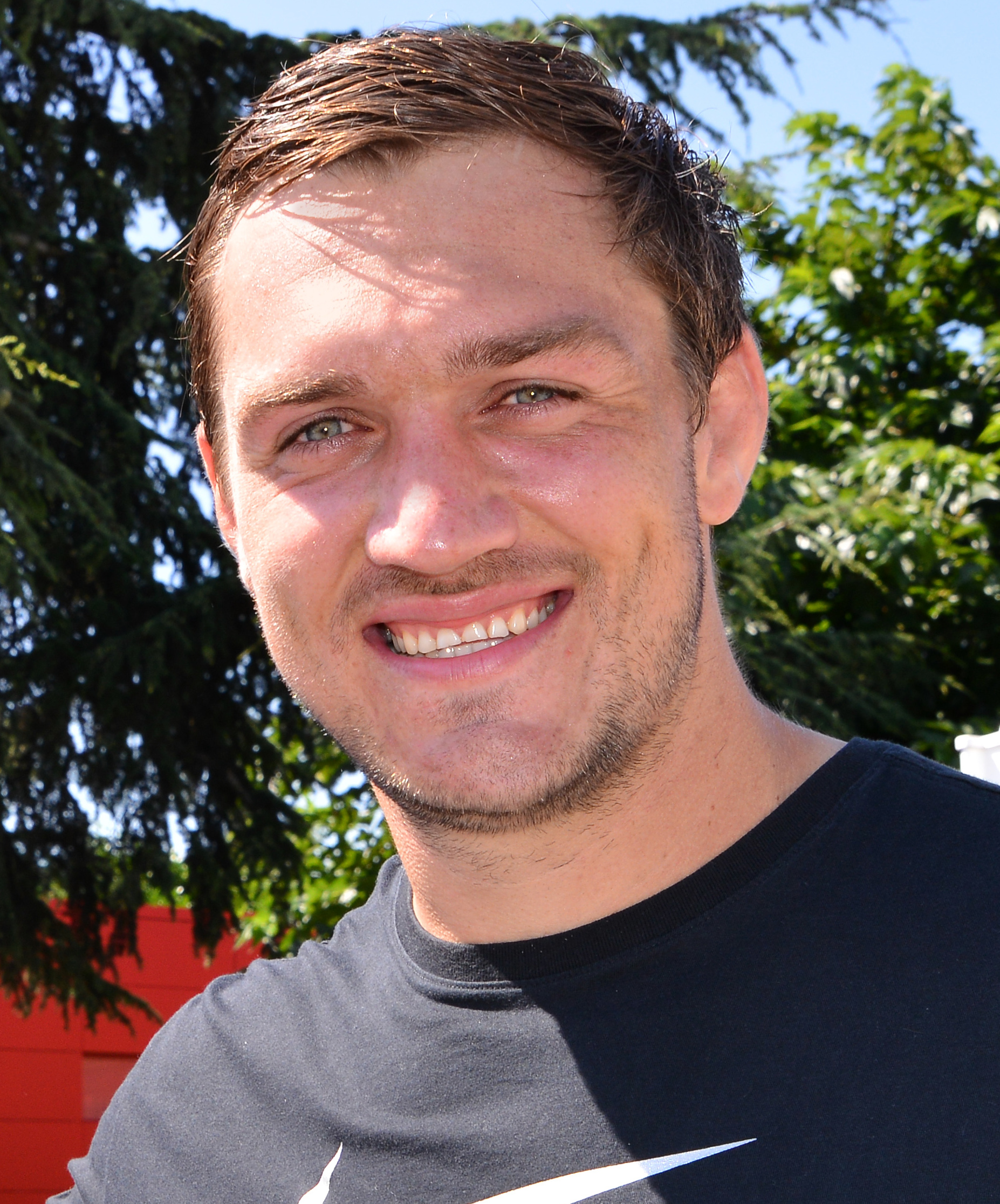
- Born: 20 December 1989 (age 36) Johannesburg, South Africa
- Height: 1.98 m (6 ft 6 in)
- Weight: 120 kg (18 st 13 lb; 265 lb)
- School: Hoërskool Montagu

Rugby union career
- Position: Lock / Flank
- Current team: Toulouse
Youth career
- 2005–2007: Boland Cavaliers
- 2008–2009: Western Province
Amateur team(s)
Years	Team	Apps	(Points)
2010	Maties	1	(0)
Senior career
Years	Team	Apps	(Points)
2010–2017	Western Province	47	(20)
2011–2017	Stormers	58	(10)
2017–present	Toulouse	100	(15)
- Correct as of 11 July 2022
International career
Years	Team	Apps	(Points)
2009	South Africa U20	3	(0)
2019–present	South Africa	4	(0)
- Correct as of 11 July 2022

Rynhardt Elstadt (born 20 December 1989) is a South African rugby union player for the South Africa national team and French Top 14 side Toulouse. He plays flank forward and lock.

== Career ==
On 19 March 2011 he helped the Stormers defeat the Blue Bulls at Loftus Versfeld stadium in Pretoria, by outplaying legendary hardman Bakkies Botha. In October 2014 he was part of the Western Province team who won the Currie Cup by beating the Lions 19-16. In June 2019 Elstadt started for Stade Toulousain in the Top 14 final, winning the French Championship. He won his first cap for South Africa in 2019 and played a part in Springboks winning the 2019 Rugby Championship.

== Honours ==
Western Province

- 2014 Currie Cup winner

Toulouse

- Heineken Cup European Champions/European Rugby Champions Cup: 2021
- Top 14 French League : 2019, 2021

South Africa

- 2019 Rugby Championship winner

=== Test history ===
No.	Opposition	Result (SA 1st)	Position	Tries	Date	Venue
1.	Australia	35–17	Flank		20 Jul 2019	Ellis Park, Johannesburg
2.	Argentina	24–18	Flank		17 Aug 2019	Loftus Versfeld, Pretoria
3.	British and Irish Lions	17–22	Replacement		24 Jul 2021	Cape Town Stadium, Cape Town
4.	Wales	12–13	Replacement		9 Jul 2022	Free State Stadium, Bloemfontein

== Super Rugby statistics ==
As of June 2020

Season	Team	Games	Starts	Sub	Mins	Tries	Points	Yellow card	Red card
2011	Stormers	15	15	0	968	0	0	0	0
2012	Stormers	12	12	0	862	0	0	2	0
2013	Stormers	10	9	1	645	0	0	0	0
2014	Stormers	2	2	0	160	0	0	0	0
2015	Stormers	2	2	0	117	0	0	0	0
2016	Stormers	11	4	7	537	0	0	0	0
2017	Stormers	6	6	0	413	2	10	2	1
Total		59	51	8	3831	2	10	4	1

== See also ==
- List of South Africa national rugby union players – Springbok no. 912
