= Tera Mtembu =

South African rugby union player

Lubabalo Mtembu
- Full name: Lubabalo Siphosethu Mtembu
- Born: 9 December 1990 (age 35) East London, South Africa
- Height: 1.87 m (6 ft 1 1/2 in)
- Weight: 102 kg (225 lb; 16 st 1 lb)
- School: Dale College

Rugby union career
- Position: Flanker / No 8
- Current team: New England Free Jacks
Youth career
- 2008–2009: Border Bulldogs
- 2010–2011: Sharks
Senior career
Years	Team	Apps	(Points)
2011–2018	Sharks XV	33	(45)
2011–2020	Sharks (Currie Cup)	44	(30)
2012–2020	Sharks	47	(25)
2021–	New England Free Jacks		
- Correct as of 28 April 2021
International career
Years	Team	Apps	(Points)
2010	South Africa U20	4	(0)
2010–2011	South Africa Sevens		
- Correct as of 6 April 2018
Medal record
Men's rugby sevens
Representing South Africa
Commonwealth Games
Bronze medal – third place	2010 Delhi	Team competition

Lubabalo Siphosethu 'Tera' Mtembu (born 9 December 1990) is a South African rugby union footballer for the New England Free Jacks of Major League Rugby (MLR). His playing position is either as a flanker or eighthman.

He also played for the Sharks in Super Rugby and in the Currie Cup.
