= Ulrich Beyers =

South African rugby union player

- Born: 22 January 1991 (age 35) Pretoria, South Africa
- Height: 1.89 m (6 ft 2 in)
- Weight: 87 kg (192 lb)
- School: Ermelo High School & Pongola Akademie

Rugby union career
- Position: Centre
Youth career
- 2007–2009: Pumas
- 2010: Western Province
- 2011–2012: Blue Bulls
Senior career
Years	Team	Apps	(Points)
2011–2014	Blue Bulls	34	(25)
2013–2014	Bulls	10	(0)
2015	→ Bordeaux	1	(3)
2015–2016	Zebre	18	(15)
2016–2017	Blue Bulls	11	(20)
2017	Bulls	1	(0)
2017–2018	Blue Bulls XV	7	(15)
2018–2019	Southern Kings	9	(10)
2018	Eastern Province Elephants	1	(0)
- Correct as of 4 May 2019
International career
Years	Team	Apps	(Points)
2011	South Africa Under-20	4	(0)
- Correct as of 13 April 2017

Ulrich Beyers is a South African rugby union player who plays for the Vladivostok Tigers in Russia. He signed for the club in August 2020. His regular position is centre or full-back.

== Blue Bulls ==
He played for Pretoria-based side Blue Bulls between 2011 and 2014, making 34 appearances in the Currie Cup and Vodacom Cup competitions. He also made 10 appearances for the Bulls Super Rugby side.

At the start of 2015, he joined French Top 14 side Bordeaux as a medical joker,

== Rugby Zebre ==
He joined Italian Pro12 side Zebre for the 2015–16 Pro12 season. He played 15 games, starting 8, playing 783 minutes, contributing 12 points in the 2015-2016 PRO12 series. He played 110 minutes in 3 games in the European Rugby Cup contributing 3 points. He scored his first try and conversion in the Pro14 for Zebre against Cardiff Blues.

== Southern Kings ==
He joined the Southern Kings ahead of the 2018–19 Pro14.
