= 2013 Vodacom Cup =

- Champions: Golden Lions
- Runners-up: Pumas
- Matches played: 63
- Tries scored: 518 (average 8.2 per match)
- Top point scorer: Fred Zeilinga (154)
- Top try scorer: Anthony Volmink (12)

The 2013 Vodacom Cup was played between 9 March and 18 May 2013 and was the 16th edition of this annual domestic cup competition. The Vodacom Cup is played between provincial rugby union teams in South Africa from the Currie Cup Premier and First Divisions, as well as Limpopo Blue Bulls and an invitational team, the Pampas XV from Argentina.

== Competition ==
There ware sixteen teams participating in the 2013 Vodacom Cup competition. These teams were geographically divided into two sections, with eight teams in both the Northern and Southern Sections. Teams played all the teams in their section once over the course of the season, either at home or away.

Teams received four log points for a win and two points for a draw. Bonus log points were awarded to teams that scored four or more tries in a game, as well as to teams that lost a match by seven points or less. Teams were ranked by log points, then points difference (points scored less points conceded).

The top four teams in each section qualified for the title play-offs. In the quarter-finals, the teams that finished first in each section had home advantage against the teams that finished fourth in that section and the teams that finished second in each section had home advantage against the teams that finished third in that section. The winners of these quarter finals then played each other in the semi-finals, with the higher placed team having home advantage. The two semi-final winners then met in the final.

== Teams ==
Location of teams in 2013 Vodacom Cup
Northern Section
Southern Section

=== Changes from 2012 ===
- Limpopo Blue Bulls, despite being part of the Blue Bulls team, played as a separate team in 2013.
- Despite initially announcing they would play, the Welwitschias, the Namibian national team, later withdrew due to a lack of funding.

=== Team Listing ===
The following teams took part in the 2013 Vodacom Cup competition:

Northern Section
Team	Sponsored Name	Stadium/s	Sponsored Name
Blue Bulls	Vodacom Blue Bulls	Loftus Versfeld, Pretoria	Loftus Versfeld
Falcons	Falcons	Barnard Stadium, Kempton Park	Barnard Stadium
Golden Lions	MTN Golden Lions	Ellis Park Stadium, Johannesburg	Ellis Park
Griffons	Down Touch Griffons	North West Stadium, Welkom	North West Stadium
Griquas	GWK Griquas	Griqua Park, Kimberley	GWK Park
Leopards XV	Leopards XV	Olën Park, Potchefstroom	Profert Olën Park
Limpopo Blue Bulls	Assupol Limpopo Blue Bulls	Peter Mokaba Stadium, Polokwane	Peter Mokaba Stadium
Pumas	Steval Pumas	Mbombela Stadium, Mbombela	Mbombela Stadium

Southern Section
Team	Sponsored Name	Stadium/s	Sponsored Name
Boland Cavaliers	Regent Boland Cavaliers	Boland Stadium, Wellington	Boland Stadium
Border Bulldogs	Border Bulldogs	Buffalo City Stadium, East London	Buffalo City Stadium
Eastern Province Kings	Eastern Province Kings	Nelson Mandela Bay Stadium, Port Elizabeth	Nelson Mandela Bay Stadium
Free State XV	Toyota Free State XV	Free State Stadium, Bloemfontein	Free State Stadium
Pampas XV (Argentina)	ICBC Pampas XV	A.F. Markötter Stadium, Stellenbosch	A.F. Markötter Stadium
Sharks XV	Sharks XV	Kings Park Stadium, Durban	Mr Price Kings Park
SWD Eagles	SWD Eagles	Outeniqua Park, George	Outeniqua Park
Western Province	DHL Western Province	Newlands Stadium, Cape Town	DHL Newlands

== Tables ==
=== Northern Section ===
2013 Vodacom Cup Northern Section table
Pos	Team	Pld	W	D	L	PF	PA	PD	TF	TA	TB	LB	Pts	Qualification
1	Pumas	7	6	0	1	414	131	+283	60	15	5	0	29	Qualified for the Quarter Finals
2	Blue Bulls	7	5	0	2	435	159	+276	59	20	6	2	28	Qualified for the Quarter Finals
3	Griquas	7	4	0	3	296	161	+135	43	24	6	0	22	Qualified for the Quarter Finals
4	Golden Lions	7	4	0	3	320	154	+166	47	17	4	1	21	Qualified for the Quarter Finals
5	Leopards XV	7	4	0	3	289	158	+131	38	18	3	2	21	
6	Griffons	7	3	0	4	133	245	−112	18	33	1	0	13	
7	Falcons	7	2	0	5	139	269	−130	18	40	1	0	9	
8	Limpopo Blue Bulls	7	0	0	7	32	781	−749	3	119	0	0	0	

Rules for classification:
- 4 points for a win
- 2 points for a draw
- 1 bonus point for a loss by seven points or less
- 1 bonus point for scoring four or more tries in a match

=== Southern Section ===
2013 Vodacom Cup Southern Section table
Pos	Team	Pld	W	D	L	PF	PA	PD	TF	TA	TB	LB	Pts	Qualification
1	Sharks XV	7	6	0	1	279	166	+113	32	18	4	1	29	Qualified for the Quarter Finals
2	Western Province	7	5	1	1	208	153	+55	26	20	4	1	27	Qualified for the Quarter Finals
3	Eastern Province Kings	7	5	1	1	191	154	+37	22	16	3	0	25	Qualified for the Quarter Finals
4	Pampas XV	7	4	1	2	238	192	+46	32	25	4	0	22	Qualified for the Quarter Finals
5	Free State XV	7	2	0	5	195	190	+5	25	22	4	5	17	
6	SWD Eagles	7	1	0	6	147	202	−55	18	22	2	4	10	
7	Border Bulldogs	7	2	0	5	143	239	−96	15	34	0	1	9	
8	Boland Cavaliers	7	1	1	5	151	256	−105	19	32	1	2	9	

Rules for classification:
- 4 points for a win
- 2 points for a draw
- 1 bonus point for a loss by seven points or less
- 1 bonus point for scoring four or more tries in a match

== Fixtures and results ==
All times are South African (GMT+2).

=== Northern Section ===
==== Round one ====
9 March 2013	Golden Lions	45 – 15	Leopards XV	Pirates Rugby Club, Johannesburg
15:00	Try: Deon van Rensburg 6'; JJ Breet 40'; Lionel Cronjé 42'; Robbie Coetzee 54'; Warren Whiteley 68'; Anthony Volmink 77'; Andries Coetzee 78'; Con: Lionel Cronjé 6', 43' (2/4); Marnitz Boshoff 68', 77', 79' (3/3); Pen: Lionel Cronjé (0/3); Cards: Callie Visagie (yellow card) 47' to 57'	Scoreboard	Try: Danie Dames 9'; Akker van der Merwe 82'; Con: Warren Gilbert (0/1); André Pretorius 82' (1/1); Pen: Warren Gilbert 18' (1/1); Drop: Warren Gilbert (0/1)	Attendance: 400; Referee: Marius van der Westhuizen

9 March 2013	Griquas	32 – 40	Blue Bulls	Griqua Park, Kimberley
15:00	Try: PJ Vermeulen 17'; Marnus Schoeman 22' penalty try 40'; Edwin Hewitt 42'; Simon Westraadt 66'; Con: Francois Brummer 40' (1/3); PJ Vermeulen 43' (1/2); Pen: Francois Brummer 8' (1/1)	Scoreboard	Try: Dries Swanepoel 11'; Ruan Snyman 14', 75'; Francois Venter 30'; Wiaan Liebenberg 46'; Sampie Mastriet 77'; Con: Tony Jantjies 12', 15', 30' (3/4); Handré Pollard 75', 77' (2/2)	Attendance: 450; Referee: Rasta Rasivhenge

9 March 2013	Limpopo Blue Bulls	14 – 50	Griffons	Peter Mokaba Stadium, Polokwane
15:00	Try: Bernard Groenewald 55'; Pen: Bronwyn Craill 28', 32', 45' (3/3); Cards: Chris Crous (yellow card) 39' to 49'	Scoreboard	Try: Nicky Steyn 2', 7', 63'; Shane Hancke 15', 38'; Aubrey McDonald 25'; Martin Sithole 44'; Ossie Nortje 79'; Con: Louis Strydom 2', 8', 28', 44', 63' (5/7); Ossie Nortje (0/1); Cards: Aubrey McDonald (yellow card) 71'	Attendance: 100; Referee: Nic Rocono

9 March 2013	Pumas	62 – 0	Falcons	Mbombela Stadium, Mbombela
15:00	Try: Vincent Koch 6', 30'; Uzair Cassiem 10', 36', 46'; Tiaan Marx 19'; Wilhelm Loock 40'; Jaco Bouwer 60', 77'; De-Jay Terblanche 66'; Con: Tiaan Marx 30', 36', 40', 46', 60', 66' (6/9); Carl Bezuidenhout (0/1)	Scoreboard	Pen: Wesley Roberts (0/1)	Attendance: 2,020; Referee: Gerrie de Bruin

==== Round two ====
15 March 2013	Falcons	27 – 22	Golden Lions	Barnard Stadium, Kempton Park
16:45	Try: Nico Engelbrecht 9', 36'; Kyle Hendricks 41'; Con: Wesley Roberts 10', 37', 42' (3/3); Pen: Wesley Roberts (0/1); Jaun Kotzé 63', 67' (2/3); Drop: Wesley Roberts (0/1); Cards: Friedle Olivier (yellow card) 45' to 55'	Scoreboard	Try: Van Zyl Botha 22'; Henri Boshoff 34'; Chris Newman 40'; Ashlon Davids 56'; Con: Hanco Deale 23' (1/4); Pen: Hanco Deale (0/1); Cards: Henri Boshoff (yellow card) 61' to 71'	Referee: Nic Rocono

15 March 2013	Leopards XV	113 – 3	Limpopo Blue Bulls	Oppenheimer Stadium, Orkney
16:00	Try: Jacques Vermaak 6', 49'; Adriaan Engelbrecht 13', 57'; Danie Dames 15'; Ian Heyns 23', 27', 43', 54'; Rhyk Welgemoed 30', 59', 65'; Edmar Marais 32', 73'; André Pretorius 67'; Joe Smith 69'; Malherbe Swart 78'; Con: André Pretorius 7', 14', 24', 28', 31', 33', 44', 50', 55', 58', 60', 66', 68', 74' (14/17)	Scoreboard	Pen: Bronwyn Craill 2' (1/1)	Referee: Rasta Rasivhenge

16 March 2013	Blue Bulls	42 – 44	Pumas	Loftus Versfeld, Pretoria
15:00	Try: Dries Swanepoel 20', 38'; Roelof Smit 69'; Sampie Mastriet 73'; Travis Ismaiel 78'; Con: Tony Jantjies 20', 38', 69', 73' (4/5); Pen: Tony Jantjies 2', 23', 33' (3/3)	Scoreboard	Try: Stefan Watermeyer 8'; Vincent Koch 13'; Marius Coetzer 26'; Ivann Espag 35'; Rosko Specman 40'; Renaldo Bothma 47'; Con: Tiaan Marx 13', 26', 36', 48' (4/6); Pen: Tiaan Marx 42' (1/2); Carl Bezuidenhout 81' (1/1); Drop: Tiaan Marx (0/1); Cards: Wilmaure Louw (yellow card) 67' to 78'	Attendance: 500; Referee: Sindile Mayende

16 March 2013	Griffons	12 – 26	Griquas	North West Stadium, Welkom
15:00	Try: Colin Herbert 42'; Japie Nel 64'; Con: Hansie Graaff 65' (1/2)	Scoreboard	Try: Justin Downey 11'; Leon Karemaker 13'; Marnus Schoeman 46'; Jannie Boshoff 57'; Con: Francois Brummer 11', 13', 57' (3/4); Cards: Marnus Schoeman (yellow card) 63' to 73'	Referee: Jaco van Heerden

==== Round three ====
22 March 2013	Leopards XV	47 – 16	Falcons	Olën Park, Potchefstroom
19:00	Try: Jacques Olivier 5'; Morné Hanekom 8', 47'; Danie Dames 11'; Edmar Marais 34'; BG Uys 42'; Akker van der Merwe 63'; Con: André Pretorius 9', 12', 35', 43', 48', 64' (6/7); Drop: André Pretorius (0/1); Cards: Warren Gilbert (yellow card) 75'	Scoreboard	Try: Friedle Olivier 22'; Con: Wesley Roberts 23' (1/1); Pen: Wesley Roberts 15', 27' (2/2); Drop: Jaun Kotzé 56' (1/2); Cards: Sandile Ngcobo (yellow card) 64' to 75'	Attendance: 700; Referee: Jaco van Heerden

23 March 2013	Golden Lions	26 – 54	Blue Bulls	Ellis Park Stadium, Johannesburg
15:00	Try: Ruhan Nel 13'; Ashlon Davids 37', 75'; Harold Vorster 39'; Con: Ashlon Davids 14', 38', 75' (3/4); Pen: Ruhan Nel (0/1)	Scoreboard	Try: Wiaan Liebenberg 9', 32'; Rohan Janse van Rensburg 19'; Travis Ismaiel 58'; Tony Jantjies 67' penalty try 80'; Con: Tony Jantjies 9', 20', 33', 59', 67' (5/5); Ulrich Beyers 80' (1/1); Pen: Tony Jantjies 2', 5', 7', 57' (4/4); Cards: Rohan Janse van Rensburg (yellow card) 61' to 72'	Attendance: 1,000; Referee: Sindile Mayende

23 March 2013	Limpopo Blue Bulls	5 – 124	Griquas	Chris Wiid Stadium, Groblersdal
15:00	Try: Ruan Muller 31'; Con: Bronwyn Craill (0/1); Pen: Bronwyn Craill (0/1)	Scoreboard	Try: penalty try 2'; Marnus Schoeman 6', 32', 59', 65', 69'; Enrico Acker 16'; Rocco Jansen 19', 34', 44', 52', 63'; Deon Carney 42'; Jacques Coetzee 47'; Luzuko Vulindlu 50', 67'; Leon Karemaker 54'; Justin Downey 75'; Francois Brummer 77'; Richard Lawson 80'; Con: Francois Brummer 33', 51', 53', 54', 60', 67', 69', 75', 78', 3', 7', 16' (12/18); PJ Vermeulen (0/1); Rocco Jansen (0/1)	Attendance: 200; Referee: Lusanda Jam

23 March 2013	Pumas	64 – 7	Griffons	Nelspruit Rugby Club, Nelspruit
16:00	Try: Corné Steenkamp 3'; Carl Bezuidenhout 7'; Stefan Watermeyer 10'; Rosko Specman 15', 41'; Faf de Klerk 50'; JW Bell 61'; Frank Herne 69', 75'; Wilhelm Loock 82'; Con: Tiaan Marx 3', 10', 15', 42' (4/5); Carl Bezuidenhout 61', 69', 75' (3/5)	Scoreboard	Try: Andries Mahoney 24'; Con: Hansie Graaff 24' (1/1); Pen: Hansie Graaff (0/1)	Attendance: 2,300; Referee: Tiaan Jonker

==== Round four ====
5 April 2013	Griquas	31 – 47	Pumas	Griqua Park, Kimberley
15:00	Try: Jonathan Adendorf 4'; Richard Lawson 24'; Leon Karemaker 35'; Deon Carney 72'; Con: Pieter-Steyn de Wet 4', 25', 36', 73' (4/4); Pen: Pieter-Steyn de Wet 14' (1/1)	Scoreboard	Try: Rosko Specman 5', 50'; JW Bell 39'; Wilhelm Loock 44'; Renaldo Bothma 53'; Stefan Watermeyer 63'; Carl Bezuidenhout 79'; Con: Tiaan Marx 6' (1/1); Carl Bezuidenhout 39', 45', 51', 64', 80' (5/6); Pen: Tiaan Marx (0/1); Carl Bezuidenhout (0/1); Cards: Wilmaure Louw (yellow card) 9' to 19'; Wilhelm Loock (yellow card) 29' to 39'	Attendance: 2,500; Referee: Ben Crouse

5 April 2013	Griffons	30 – 19	Golden Lions	North West Stadium, Welkom
18:30	Try: Japie Nel 51'; Shane Hancke 40'; Vuyo Mbotho 44'; Con: Hansie Graaff 52', 40', 45' (3/3); Pen: Hansie Graaff 9', 48' (2/5); Drop: Hansie Graaff 70' (1/1)	Scoreboard	Try: Vian van der Watt 54'; Ruaan Lerm 32'; Con: Marais Schmidt (0/2); Pen: Marais Schmidt 3', 15', 46' (3/4); Cards: Chris Newman (yellow card) 77'	Attendance: 129; Referee: Jaco Kotze

6 April 2013	Blue Bulls	26 – 33	Leopards XV	Loftus Versfeld, Pretoria
15:00	Try: Jean Cook 37'; Roelof Smit 43'; Con: Tony Jantjies 38', 44' (2/2); Pen: Tony Jantjies 3', 19', 24', 66' (4/4)	Scoreboard	Try: Rhyk Welgemoed 61'; Morné Hanekom 72'; Con: André Pretorius 73' (1/2); Pen: André Pretorius 13', 27', 40', 47', 51', 55', 77' (7/7)	Referee: Jason Jaftha

6 April 2013	Limpopo Blue Bulls	7 – 69	Falcons	Merensky High School, Tzaneen
15:00	Try: Rory Cresswell 52'; Con: Bronwyn Craill 52' (1/1); Cards: Wickus Davel (yellow card) 15' to 25'	Scoreboard	Try: MP van Eeden 5'; Arno Poley 10'; JP Mostert 14', 24', 30', 76'; Russell van Wyk 39'; Jongi Nokwe 42', 57', 61'; Coert Cronjé 79'; Con: Jaun Kotzé 6', 14', 25', 31', 40', 42' (6/10); Coert Cronjé 80' (1/1)

==== Round Five ====
12 April 2013	Golden Lions	24 – 11	Griquas	UJ Stadium, Johannesburg
15:00	Try: Warren Whiteley 5'; Deon van Rensburg 27'; Michael Bondesio 45'; Con: Marnitz Boshoff 6', 27', 45' (3/3); Pen: Marnitz Boshoff 32' (1/1); Cards: Jaco Kriel (yellow card) 58' to 68'; Julian Redelinghuys (yellow card) 68' to 79'	Scoreboard	Try: Jacques Coetzee 70'; Pen: Pieter-Steyn de Wet 8', 40' (2/3); Cards: Jean Stemmet (yellow card) 50' to 60'; Marnus Schoeman (yellow card) 53' to 63'	Attendance: 500; Referee: Jaco van Heerden

12 April 2013	Leopards XV	27 – 7	Griffons	Olën Park, Potchefstroom
17:05	Try: Danie Dames 56', 49'; Morné Hanekom 76'; Con: André Pretorius 50', 57', 77' (3/3); Pen: André Pretorius 30', 36' (2/3); Cards: Robert Kruger (yellow card) 77'	Scoreboard	Try: Aubrey McDonald 79'; Con: Colin Herbert 80' (1/1); Pen: Hansie Graaff (0/3); Drop: Hansie Graaff (0/2); Cards: Rudi Britz (yellow card) 31' to 41'	Referee: Cwengile Jadezweni

13 April 2013	Falcons	14 – 74	Blue Bulls	Hugenote High School, Springs
15:00	Try: Anrich Richter 19'; Jaun Kotzé 51'; Con: Jaun Kotzé 19', 51' (2/2); Pen: Jaun Kotzé (0/1); Cards: Francois Fourie (yellow card) 5' to 16'	Scoreboard	Try: Wiaan Liebenberg 6', 37'; Sampie Mastriet 12', 15', 24', 43'; Clayton Blommetjies 32'; Travis Ismaiel 57', 69'; Courtnall Skosan 62', 77'; Piet Lindeque 71'; Con: Willie du Plessis 12', 25', 32', 37', 43', 62', 69' (7/10); Kobus Marais (0/2)	Attendance: 1,000; Referee: Lourens van der Merwe

13 April 2013	Pumas	154 – 0	Limpopo Blue Bulls	Mbombela Stadium, Mbombela
15:00	Try: Corné Fourie 1'; Jaco Bouwer 8', 37', 51'; JW Bell 16', 24', 77'; Danwel Demas 19', 30', 55', 65'; Frank Herne 26'; RW Kember 33'; Ashwin Scott 41'; Jerome Pretorius 42'; De-Jay Terblanche 46'; Doppies le Roux 49'; Dewald Pretorius 61'; Renaldo Bothma 63', 73'; Eduan van der Walt 68'; Drew van Coller 81'; Con: Carl Bezuidenhout 2', 8', 17', 20', 25', 27', 31', 33', 38', 41', 42' (11/11); Coenie van Wyk 47', 50', 52', 56', 62', 63', 66', 69', 73', 78', 81' (11/11)	Scoreboard	Pen: Zander Byleveldt (0/2)	Referee: Tiaan Jonker

==== Round Six ====
19 April 2013	Griffons	17 – 6	Falcons	North West Stadium, Welkom
18:30	Try: Vuyo Mbotho 9'; Ossie Nortje 50'; Con: Hansie Graaff 10', 50' (2/2); Pen: Hansie Graaff 58' (1/2); Drop: Hansie Graaff (0/1); Cards: Derick van Heerden (yellow card) 38' to 48'	Scoreboard	Pen: Jaun Kotzé 22', 38' (2/2)	Attendance: 100; Referee: Eduan Nel

19 April 2013	Pumas	14 – 23	Golden Lions	Mbombela Stadium, Mbombela
19:10	Try: Rosko Specman 51'; Frank Herne 81'; Con: Carl Bezuidenhout 52' (1/1); Coenie van Wyk 82' (1/1); Pen: Carl Bezuidenhout (0/1)	Scoreboard	Try: Derick Minnie 13'; Jaco Kriel 71'; Con: Marnitz Boshoff 14', 72' (2/2); Pen: Marnitz Boshoff 28', 57' (2/2); Drop: Marnitz Boshoff 59' (1/1)	Attendance: 2,500; Referee: Lusanda Jam

20 April 2013	Limpopo Blue Bulls	0 – 110	Blue Bulls	Mogol Club Stadium, Lephalale
15:00		Scoreboard	Try: Ruan Snyman 4', 57'; Wiaan Liebenberg 8'; Dean Greyling 13', 77'; Clayton Blommetjies 16'; Hencus van Wyk 20'; Travis Ismaiel 25', 30'; Sampie Mastriet 45'; Courtnall Skosan 50', 79'; Willie du Plessis 54', 60'; Rohan Janse van Rensburg 66'; Nardus van der Walt 70'; Con: Willie du Plessis 5', 9', 14', 21', 26', 31', 46', 51', 55', 58', 61', 67', 71', 78', 80' (15/16)	Attendance: 200; Referee: Rasta Rasivhenge: Records = Blue Bulls highest ever score in the Vodacom cup

20 April 2013	Griquas	32 – 26	Leopards XV	Griqua Park, Kimberley
15:30	Try: Marnus Schoeman 20'; Jean Stemmet 33'; Jacques Coetzee 40'; Leon Karemaker 61'; Con: Pieter-Steyn de Wet 21', 40', 62' (3/4); Pen: Pieter-Steyn de Wet 69' (1/1); Drop: Pieter-Steyn de Wet 43' (1/1); Cards: Marnus Schoeman (yellow card) 57' to 67'	Scoreboard	Try: André Pretorius 39'; Hennie Skorbinski 58'; Kene Okafor 74'; Robert Kruger 81'; Con: André Pretorius 39', 59', 75' (3/4); Pen: André Pretorius (0/2)	Referee: Pro Legoete

==== Round Seven ====
26 April 2013	Leopards XV	28 – 29	Pumas	Olën Park, Potchefstroom
19:00	Try: Brendon Snyman 50'; Hoffmann Maritz 64'; Henro Swart 73'; Con: Warren Gilbert (0/1); Adriaan Engelbrecht 65', 74' (2/2); Pen: Warren Gilbert 3', 8', 41' (3/5)	Scoreboard	Try: Uzair Cassiem 22'; Vincent Koch 39'; Rosko Specman 69'; Con: Carl Bezuidenhout 69' (1/3); Pen: Carl Bezuidenhout 15', 46', 59', 66' (4/4)	Attendance: 400; Referee: Jonathan Kaplan

27 April 2013	Blue Bulls	89 – 10	Griffons	Loftus Versfeld, Pretoria
14:45	Try: Nardus van der Walt 7', 24'; Wiaan Liebenberg 36'; Rohan Janse van Rensburg 38', 58'; Jacques du Plessis 41'; Dries Swanepoel 47', 50'; Courtnall Skosan 56'; Vainon Willis 62'; Clayton Blommetjies 64'; Tony Jantjies 71'; Sampie Mastriet 78'; Con: Willie du Plessis 25', 37', 39', 42', 48', 51', 57', 59' (8/9); Tony Jantjies 63', 65', 72', 79' (4/4); Pen: Willie du Plessis (0/1)	Scoreboard	Try: Aubrey McDonald 75'; Con: Hansie Graaff 76' (1/1); Pen: Hansie Graaff 19' (1/1)	Referee: Sindile Mayende

27 April 2013	Falcons	7 – 40	Griquas	Barnard Stadium, Kempton Park
15:00	Try: Sandile Ngcobo 60'; Con: Jaun Kotzé 60' (1/1); Cards: Francois Fourie (yellow card) 51' to 61'	Scoreboard	Try: Leon Karemaker 28', 73'; Enrico Acker 32'; Janro van Niekerk 38', 57', 67'; Con: Pieter-Steyn de Wet 28', 32', 38', 57', 73' (5/6)	Attendance: 500; Referee: Jaco van Heerden

27 April 2013	Golden Lions	161 – 3	Limpopo Blue Bulls	Alberton Rugby Club, Alberton
15:00	Try: Anthony Volmink 1', 15', 28', 33', 51', 65', 67', 72', 80'; Lionel Cronjé 3', 26'; Jaco Kriel 9', 41'; Warren Whiteley 13'; Jean-Pierre du Plessis 21'; Chrysander Botha 37', 61'; Julian Redelinghuys 39'; François du Toit 42'; Guy Cronjé 46', 56'; Deon Helberg 50'; Vian van der Watt 70'; JJ Breet 73'; Dylan des Fountain 77'; Con: Guy Cronjé 9', 13', 21', 26', 38', 40', 41', 46', 50', 52', 56', 67' (12/16); Lionel Cronjé (0/1); Chrysander Botha 61' (1/1); Anthony Volmink 65' (1/1); Ross Cronjé 70', 72', 74' (3/5); Kobus de Kock 80' (1/1)	Scoreboard	Pen: Bronwyn Craill 10' (1/2); Cards: Bronwyn Craill (red card) 28'	Attendance: 2,600; Referee: Lihan Pretorius

=== Southern Section ===
==== Round one ====
8 March 2013	SWD Eagles	8 – 31	Free State XV	Outeniqua Park, George
19:00	Try: Grant Kemp 4'; Con: Elric van Vuuren (0/1); Pen: Elric van Vuuren 47' (1/1); Cards: Giant Mtyanda (yellow card) 43' to 53'; Michael Vermaak (yellow card) 54' to 64'	Scoreboard	Try: Neil Claassen 9'; Eddie Fredericks 61'; Ludwig Erasmus 78'; Con: Tewis de Bruyn 10', 78' (2/3); Pen: Tewis de Bruyn 16', 19', 37', 76' (4/6)	Referee: Stuart Berry

8 March 2013	Sharks XV	72 – 6	Border Bulldogs	Kings Park Stadium, Durban
16:30	Try: S'bura Sithole 17'; Tyler Fisher 25', 36'; Fred Zeilinga 42', 74'; Sizo Maseko 45', 66'; Heimar Williams 60'; Gouws Prinsloo 69'; Hanco Venter 76'; Con: Fred Zeilinga 18', 25', 36', 60', 66', 69', 74', 76' (8/10); Pen: Fred Zeilinga 2', 39' (2/2)	Scoreboard	Pen: Karlo Aspeling 8', 35' (2/2)	Attendance: 50; Referee: Marius Jonker

9 March 2013	Eastern Province Kings	20 – 20	Pampas XV	Nelson Mandela Bay Stadium, Port Elizabeth
16:45	Try: Scott van Breda 14'; Con: Wesley Dunlop (0/1); Pen: Wesley Dunlop 4', 23', 32', 80' (4/6); Scott van Breda 59' (1/1)	Scoreboard	Try: Manuel Montero 74'; Con: Benjamín Madero (0/1); Pen: Benjamín Madero 1', 17', 20', 66', 68' (5/7); Cards: Javier Rojas Alvarez (yellow card) 32' to 42'	Attendance: 4,550; Referee: Francois Pretorius

9 March 2013	Boland Cavaliers	17 – 17	Western Province	Victoria Park, Ceres
14:45	Try: Chris Buckle 10'; Ashton Constant 73'; Con: Ricardo Croy 11' (1/1); Jacquin Jansen 74' (1/1); Pen: Ricardo Croy (0/1); Jacquin Jansen 61' (1/2); Drop: Ricardo Croy (0/1); Jacquin Jansen (0/1); Cards: Albert Trytsman (yellow card) 51' to 61'; Chris Buckle (yellow card) 76'	Scoreboard	Try: Chris Cloete 6'; Devon Williams 22'; Jody Reyneke 77'; Con: Kurt Coleman (0/2); Gary van Aswegen 78' (1/1)	Attendance: 7,521; Referee: Juan Sylvestre

==== Round two ====
16 March 2013	Border Bulldogs	22 – 30	Eastern Province Kings	Buffalo City Stadium, East London
15:00	Try: Joe Seerane 35', 44'; Sinovuyo Nyoka 80'; Con: Karlo Aspeling 36', 45' (2/3); Pen: Karlo Aspeling 3' (1/1)	Scoreboard	Try: Paul Schoeman 17'; Virgile Lacombe 24'; Devin Oosthuizen 29'; Siviwe Soyizwapi 54'; Con: Wesley Dunlop 18', 25' (2/4); Pen: Wesley Dunlop 10' (1/1); Scott van Breda 75' (1/3)	Referee: Ben Crouse

16 March 2013	Western Province	23 – 24	Sharks XV	City Park Stadium, Athlone
15:30	Try: Michael van der Spuy 47'; Rayn Smid 71'; Con: Gary van Aswegen 47', 72' (2/2); Pen: Gary van Aswegen 16', 21' (2/4); Drop: Gary van Aswegen 25' (1/1); Cards: Dylan Rogers (red card) 59'; Hendrik Ferreira (yellow card) 80'	Scoreboard	Try: S'bura Sithole 18'; Sizo Maseko 33'; Riaan Viljoen 81'; Con: Fred Zeilinga 19', 34', 82' (3/3); Pen: Fred Zeilinga 50' (1/3); Cards: Marius Joubert (yellow card) 16' to 26'; Allan Dell (red card) 59'	Referee: Matt Kemp

16 March 2013	Free State XV	23 – 27	Boland Cavaliers	CUT Stadium, Bloemfontein
14:15	Try: Ludwig Erasmus 38'; Joubert Engelbrecht 44'; Tewis de Bruyn 51'; Con: Tewis de Bruyn 52' (1/3); Pen: Tewis de Bruyn 1', 15' (2/2)	Scoreboard	Try: Thor Halvorsen 21', 32'; Tythan Adams 74'; Con: Ricardo Croy 22', 33' (2/2); Garth April 75' (1/1); Pen: Ricardo Croy 42', 67' (2/4); Cards: Franzel September (yellow card) 37' to 47'; Thor Halvorsen (yellow card) 78'	Attendance: 1,000; Referee: Archie Sehlako

15 March 2013	SWD Eagles	17 – 22	Pampas XV	Outeniqua Park, George
19:00	Try: Alshaun Bock 20'; Lyndon Hartnick 48'; Con: Elric van Vuuren 21', 49' (2/2); Pen: Elric van Vuuren 51' (1/3)	Scoreboard	Try: penalty try 28'; Tomás Cubelli 33'; Manuel Montero 53'; Con: Santiago González Iglesias 28', 34' (2/3); Pen: Santiago González Iglesias 10' (1/2)	Referee: Marius van der Westhuizen

==== Round three ====
22 March 2013	Eastern Province Kings	18 – 43	Western Province	NMMU Stadium, Port Elizabeth
19:00	Try: Boetie Britz 40'; Mpho Mbiyozo 43'; Con: Wesley Dunlop 44' (1/2); Pen: Wesley Dunlop 4', 54' (2/4)	Scoreboard	Try: Ruan Botha 6'; Chris Cloete 12', 20', 36'; Cheslin Kolbe 26'; Con: Tim Swiel 7', 13', 27' (3/5); Pen: Gary van Aswegen 57', 62', 69' (3/3); Drop: Gary van Aswegen 50' (1/1); Cheslin Kolbe (0/1)	Attendance: 3,400; Referee: Pro Legoete

23 March 2013	Sharks XV	34 – 33	Free State XV	Kings Park Stadium, Durban
14:45	Try: Sizo Maseko 12'; Fred Zeilinga 36'; S'bura Sithole 73'; Franco Marais 77'; Con: Fred Zeilinga 13', 37', 74', 78' (4/4); Pen: Fred Zeilinga 10', 31' (2/2)	Scoreboard	Try: Rossouw de Klerk 19'; Joubert Engelbrecht 32'; Elandré Huggett 52'; Freddy Ngoza 80'; Con: Tewis de Bruyn 33', 81' (2/4); Pen: Tewis de Bruyn 5', 24', 72' (3/4); Nico Scheepers (0/1)	Referee: Craig Joubert

23 March 2013	Boland Cavaliers	12 – 44	SWD Eagles	Callie de Wet Stadium, Robertson
16:00	Try: Albert Trytsman 17'; PJ van Zyl 21'; Con: Garth April 18' (1/2); Cards: Franzel September (yellow card) 47' to 57'; Francois Hanekom (yellow card) 74'	Scoreboard	Try: Johan Herbst 14' penalty try 47'; Deroy Rhoode 48'; Lyndon Hartnick 55'; Kabamba Floors 64'; Con: Jeff Taljard 15', 47', 49', 56', 65' (5/5); Pen: Jeff Taljard 5', 10', 70' (3/3)	Attendance: 3,000; Referee: Juan Sylvestre

23 March 2013	Pampas XV	45 – 26	Border Bulldogs	A.F. Markötter Stadium, Stellenbosch
16:00	Try: Jerónimo de la Fuente 1', 25'; Matías Masera 9'; Benjamín Macome 30'; Santiago Cordero 52' penalty try 58'; César Fruttero 73'; Con: Benjamín Madero 10', 26', 53', 58' (4/6); Santiago González Iglesias 74' (1/1); Cards: Bruno Postiglioni (yellow card) 77'	Scoreboard	Try: Quinton Crocker 62'; Spanner Pretorius 69'; Joe Seerane 78'; Con: Karlo Aspeling 70' (1/3); Pen: Karlo Aspeling 4', 13', 21' (3/3)	Referee: Marius Jonker

==== Round four ====
5 April 2013	SWD Eagles	22 – 26	Sharks XV	Outeniqua Park, George
19:00	Try: Mzo Dyantyi 45'; Con: Jeff Taljard 45' (1/1); Pen: Jeff Taljard 4', 12', 16', 31', 50' (5/5)	Scoreboard	Try: Francois Kleinhans 38'; Sean Robinson 70'; Con: Fred Zeilinga 38', 71' (2/2); Pen: Fred Zeilinga 7', 27', 47', 67' (4/4)	Attendance: 1,200; Referee: Quinton Immelman

6 April 2013	Free State XV	13 – 17	Eastern Province Kings	Free State Stadium, Bloemfontein
14:45	Try: Ludwig Erasmus 34'; Oupa Mohojé 45'; Con: Tewis de Bruyn (0/2); Pen: Tewis de Bruyn 50' (1/3)	Scoreboard	Try: Wayne Stevens 23'; Con: Scott van Breda (0/1); Pen: Scott van Breda 14', 48', 66', 76' (4/6)	Referee: Sindile Mayende

6 April 2013	Western Province	22 – 13	Border Bulldogs	Paarl RFC, Paarl
15:30	Try: Chris Cloete 31'; Devon Williams 57'; Jody Reyneke 70'; Con: Kurt Coleman 32', 71' (2/3); Pen: Kurt Coleman 40' (1/1)	Scoreboard	Try: Duane Adams 4'; Juan Bester 11'; Con: Karlo Aspeling (0/2); Pen: Karlo Aspeling 38' (1/2)

6 April 2013	Boland Cavaliers	23 – 65	Pampas XV	Boland Stadium, Wellington
16:00	Try: Brendon April 10'; Cheslyn Roberts 24'; Ulrich Pretorius 50'; Tythan Adams 73'; Con: Ricardo Croy (0/3); Jacquin Jansen (0/1); Pen: Ricardo Croy 41' (1/2)	Scoreboard	Try: Santiago González Iglesias 15', 43'; Tomás de la Vega 37'; Manuel Montero 59', 70'; Martín Landajo 67', 79'; Martín García Veiga 75'; Con: Santiago González Iglesias 16', 38', 43', 60', 68', 71' (6/6); Benjamín Madero 76', 80' (2/2); Pen: Santiago González Iglesias 13', 21', 27' (3/3)	Attendance: 2,200; Referee: Matt Kemp

==== Round Five ====
12 April 2013	Eastern Province Kings	52 – 10	SWD Eagles	NMMU Stadium, Port Elizabeth
15:00	Try: Yamkela Ngam 1', 38'; Scott van Breda 6'; Siyanda Grey 11', 22'; Luke Watson 50'; Tiger Mangweni 57'; Con: Scott van Breda 2', 7', 12', 23', 39', 51', 58' (7/7); Pen: Scott van Breda 36' (1/1)	Scoreboard	Try: Jeff Taljard 18'; Kabamba Floors 62'; Con: Jeff Taljard (0/2); Pen: Jeff Taljard (0/1)	Attendance: 1,000; Referee: Marius van der Westhuizen

12 April 2013	Sharks XV	54 – 24	Boland Cavaliers	Kings Park Stadium, Durban
16:30	Try: Brynard Stander 3', 30'; S'bura Sithole 13'; Heimar Williams 39'; Murray Bondesio 77'; Jaco van Tonder 81'; Con: Fred Zeilinga 3', 13', 30', 39', 77', 81' (6/6); Pen: Fred Zeilinga 21', 25', 57', 74' (4/4); Cards: Franco Marais (yellow card) 67' to 77'	Scoreboard	Try: Ulrich Pretorius 35'; Jacquin Jansen 53' penalty try 66'; Con: Ricardo Croy 35', 53', 66' (3/3); Pen: Ricardo Croy 1' (1/1)	Attendance: 200; Referee: Quinton Immelman

13 April 2013	Border Bulldogs	25 – 26	Free State XV	Davidson Rugby Field, Alice
15:00	Try: Niell Jacobs 2'; Khwezi Mkhafu 14'; Ernst Ladendorf 76'; Con: Karlo Aspeling 15', 76' (2/3); Pen: Karlo Aspeling 60', 66' (2/2)	Scoreboard	Try: Tertius Daniller 20', 30'; Noël Marx 57'; Joubert Engelbrecht 71'; Con: Elgar Watts 21' (1/2); Nico Scheepers 58', 72' (2/2); Pen: Elgar Watts (0/1); Drop: Noël Marx (0/1)	Attendance: 500; Referee: François Groenewald

13 April 2013	Pampas XV	17 – 28	Western Province	Newlands Stadium, Cape Town
14:30	Try: Manuel Montero 2'; Leonardo Senatore 17'; Matías Masera 43'; Con: Benjamín Madero 18' (1/3); Pen: Santiago González Iglesias (0/1); Drop: Benjamín Madero (0/1)	Scoreboard	Try: Patrick Howard 6', 52'; Sikhumbuzo Notshe 46'; Tim Swiel 55'; Con: Michael van der Spuy (0/3); Dillyn Leyds 56' (1/1); Pen: Michael van der Spuy (0/1); Dillyn Leyds 65' (1/1); Drop: Tim Swiel 75' (1/1)	Attendance: 2,000; Referee: Pieter Janse van Vuuren

==== Round Six ====
19 April 2013	Border Bulldogs	26 – 25	Boland Cavaliers	Buffalo City Stadium, East London
17:05	Try: Joe Seerane 12'; Dean Muir 39'; Khwezi Mkhafu 44'; Con: Dale Sabbagh 40' (1/3); Pen: Karlo Aspeling 58', 66', 78' (3/4)	Scoreboard	Try: Braam Gerber 3'; Ulrich Pretorius 51', 75'; Con: Ricardo Croy 4', 52' (2/3); Pen: Ricardo Croy 17', 55' (2/3)	Referee: Lourens van der Merwe

20 April 2013	Pampas XV	38 – 32	Free State XV	A.F. Markötter Stadium, Stellenbosch
15:00	Try: Manuel Montero 12'; Rodrigo Bruno 17'; Tomás Cubelli 20'; Facundo Barrea 30', 64'; Con: Santiago González Iglesias 13', 18', 21', 31', 65' (5/5); Pen: Santiago González Iglesias 68' (1/2); Cards: Mariano Galarza (yellow card) 5' to 18'; Leonardo Senatore (yellow card) 58' to 68'	Scoreboard	Try: Boom Prinsloo 37', 50', 59'; Sethu Tom 61'; Joubert Engelbrecht 76'; Con: Elgar Watts 38', 51' (2/5); Pen: Elgar Watts 8' (1/1)	Referee: Francois Pretorius

20 April 2013	Western Province	34 – 27	SWD Eagles	Helderberg RFC, Strand
15:30	Try: Rayn Smid 20'; Michael van der Spuy 23'; Sikhumbuzo Notshe 41'; Kobus van Wyk 67'; Con: Kurt Coleman 21', 24', 42', 68' (4/4); Pen: Kurt Coleman 17', 40' (2/2)	Scoreboard	Try: Alshaun Bock 9'; Clinton Wagman 30'; Ghafoer Luckan 75'; Christo du Plessis 77'; Con: Jeff Taljard 76', 78' (2/4); Pen: Jeff Taljard 4' (1/1)	Referee: Jason Jaftha

20 April 2013	Eastern Province Kings	27 – 23	Sharks XV	Nelson Mandela Bay Stadium, Port Elizabeth
16:15	Try: Ntabeni Dukisa 47'; Siyanda Grey 63'; Stefan Willemse 67'; Con: Ntabeni Dukisa 48' (1/1); Kayle van Zyl 64', 68' (2/2); Pen: Ntabeni Dukisa 4' (1/3); Kayle van Zyl 73' (1/2)	Scoreboard	Try: Guy Alexander 53'; Con: Fred Zeilinga (0/1); Pen: Fred Zeilinga 1', 6', 14', 25', 34', 64' (6/7)	Attendance: 500; Referee: Ben Crouse

==== Round Seven ====
26 April 2013	Sharks XV	46 – 31	Pampas XV	Kings Park Stadium, Durban
18:00	Try: Kotaro Matsushima 3'; Willem Alberts 11', 44'; Robbie Harris 21'; Marius Joubert 36'; Jaco van Tonder 39'; Con: Fred Zeilinga 4', 11', 37', 39', 45' (5/6); Pen: Fred Zeilinga 6', 71' (2/2)	Scoreboard	Try: Joya Ramiro Moyano 29'; Leonardo Senatore 59'; Juan Pablo Estelles 65', 79'; Mariano Galarza 75'; Con: Benjamín Madero 60' (1/2); Santiago González Iglesias 66', 75' (2/3); Cards: Tomás de la Vega (yellow card) 6' to 15'	Attendance: 1,062; Referee: Rasta Rasivhenge

26 April 2013	SWD Eagles	19 – 25	Border Bulldogs	Outeniqua Park, George
19:10	Try: Alshaun Bock 10'; Martin du Toit 24'; Clinton Wagman 64'; Con: Jeff Taljard 11' (1/2); Elric van Vuuren 65' (1/1); Cards: Mzo Dyantyi (yellow card) 42' to 52'; Shaun Raubenheimer (yellow card) 67' to 78'	Scoreboard	Try: Chrislyn van Schalkwyk 75'; Con: Karlo Aspeling 76' (1/1); Pen: Karlo Aspeling 16', 20', 33', 37', 47', 67' (6/8); Drop: Karlo Aspeling (0/1)	Referee: Archie Sehlako

27 April 2013	Boland Cavaliers	23 – 27	Eastern Province Kings	Wesbank Sports Grounds, Malmesbury
16:00	Try: Senan van der Merwe 25'; Clemen Lewis 73'; Con: Jacquin Jansen 26', 74' (2/2); Pen: Jacquin Jansen 10', 14', 59' (3/5)	Scoreboard	Try: Paul Schoeman 31'; Stefan Willemse 49'; Kayle van Zyl 55'; Devin Oosthuizen 78'; Con: Scott van Breda (0/1); Kayle van Zyl 50', 56' (2/2); Wesley Dunlop (0/1); Pen: Scott van Breda 3' (1/1)	Attendance: 4,800; Referee: Gerrie de Bruin

27 April 2013	Free State XV	37 – 41	Western Province	Free State Stadium, Bloemfontein
16:45	Try: Boom Prinsloo 1', 51'; Oupa Mohojé 31'; Tewis de Bruyn 44'; Con: Riaan Smit 2', 32', 45' (3/3); Nico Scheepers 52' (1/1); Pen: Riaan Smit 15' (1/1); Nico Scheepers 65', 73' (2/2)	Scoreboard	Try: Berton Klaasen 8', 26'; Cheslin Kolbe 21'; Michael van der Spuy 41'; Kobus van Wyk 75'; Con: Kurt Coleman 9', 22', 27', 42', 76' (5/5); Pen: Kurt Coleman 39', 71' (2/3)	Attendance: 4,000; Referee: Marius Jonker

=== Quarter finals ===
3 May 2013	Sharks XV	25 – 42	Golden Lions	Kings Park Stadium, Durban
15:00	Try: Sizo Maseko 38'; Con: Fred Zeilinga 39' (1/1); Pen: Fred Zeilinga 22', 26', 29', 44', 52', 67' (6/6)	Scoreboard	Try: Deon van Rensburg 47'; Anthony Volmink 59'; Chrysander Botha 81'; Con: Marnitz Boshoff 48', 60', 82' (3/3); Pen: Marnitz Boshoff 5', 13', 28', 31', 35', 73' (6/7); Drop: Marnitz Boshoff 40' (1/1)	Attendance: 1,000; Referee: Ben Crouse

3 May 2013	Pumas	44 – 37	Pampas XV	Mbombela Stadium, Mbombela
19:10	Try: Rosko Specman 5', 8', 74'; Carl Bezuidenhout 32'; Vincent Koch 65'; Con: Carl Bezuidenhout 6', 9', 33', 66', 75' (5/5); Pen: Carl Bezuidenhout 3', 24', 71' (3/4)	Scoreboard	Try: Rodrigo Báez 20'; Tomás Cubelli 37'; Martín García Veiga 45'; Joya Ramiro Moyano 67'; Manuel Montero 80'; Con: Santiago González Iglesias 21', 68', 80' (3/5); Pen: Santiago González Iglesias 30', 56' (2/5)	Referee: Jaco van Heerden

4 May 2013	Western Province	21 – 13	Griquas	Newlands Stadium, Cape Town
15:30	Try: Cheslin Kolbe 37', 42'; Con: Kurt Coleman 38' (1/2); Pen: Kurt Coleman 40', 45', 50' (3/3)	Scoreboard	Try: Marnus Schoeman 35'; Con: Pieter-Steyn de Wet 36' (1/1); Pen: Pieter-Steyn de Wet 6', 59' (2/2); Francois Brummer (0/1); Cards: Leon Karemaker (yellow card) 39' to 50'	Referee: Sindile Mayende

4 May 2013	Blue Bulls	31 – 34	Eastern Province Kings	Loftus Versfeld, Pretoria
16:30	Try: Sampie Mastriet 33'; Dries Swanepoel 36'; Wiaan Liebenberg 59'; Basil Short 63'; Con: Handré Pollard 34', 37', 60', 64' (4/4); Pen: Handré Pollard 25' (1/1); Drop: Handré Pollard (0/1)	Scoreboard	Try: Stefan Willemse 45'; Mpho Mbiyozo 72'; Dalton Davis 76'; Lizo Gqoboka 82'; Con: Kayle van Zyl 45' (1/1); Wesley Dunlop 72', 76', 82' (3/3); Pen: Scott van Breda 9', 18' (2/2); Kayle van Zyl (0/1)	Referee: Tiaan Jonker

=== Semi-finals ===
10 May 2013	Pumas	39 – 13	Eastern Province Kings	Mbombela Stadium, Mbombela
16:30	Try: Rosko Specman 32'; Coenie van Wyk 63'; JW Bell 76'; Con: Carl Bezuidenhout 33', 64', 77' (3/3); Pen: Carl Bezuidenhout 20', 23', 27', 44', 68' (5/5); Drop: Carl Bezuidenhout 9' (1/2); Corné Steenkamp (0/1)	Scoreboard	Try: Mpho Mbiyozo 38'; Con: Wesley Dunlop 38' (1/1); Pen: Wesley Dunlop 55', 60' (2/2)	Referee: Tiaan Jonker

11 May 2013	Golden Lions	44 – 25	Western Province	Ellis Park Stadium, Johannesburg
14:15	Try: Deon van Rensburg 8'; Deon Helberg 22'; Chrysander Botha 47', 72'; Anthony Volmink 57'; Willie Britz 61'; Con: Marnitz Boshoff 23', 48', 58', 62' (4/6); Pen: Marnitz Boshoff 2' (1/2); Drop: Marnitz Boshoff 13' (1/1)	Scoreboard	Try: Tim Swiel 29'; Kobus van Wyk 79'; Con: Kurt Coleman (0/2); Pen: Kurt Coleman 5', 18', 36', 52', 55' (5/6); Drop: Kurt Coleman (0/1); Cards: Tazz Fuzani (yellow card) 61' to 71'	Referee: Marius Jonker

=== Final ===
18 May 2013	Pumas	28 – 42	Golden Lions	Mbombela Stadium, Mbombela
19:10	Try: Stefan Watermeyer 6'; Coenie van Wyk 17'; Jerome Pretorius 76'; Con: Carl Bezuidenhout 7', 18' (2/3); Pen: Carl Bezuidenhout 3', 40', 64' (3/3)	Scoreboard	Try: Anthony Volmink 12'; Warren Whiteley 26'; Warwick Tecklenburg 71'; Con: Marnitz Boshoff 13', 27', 72' (3/3); Pen: Marnitz Boshoff 16', 35', 39', 57', 61', 66' (6/6); Drop: Marnitz Boshoff 79' (1/2); Cards: Hendrik Roodt (yellow card) 5' to 16'	Attendance: 9,100; Referee: Marius van der Westhuizen

== Winners ==
2013 Vodacom Cup Champions
Golden Lions
Fifth title

== Players ==
=== Leading try scorers ===
Top 10 try scorers
Pos	Name	Team	Tries
1	Anthony Volmink	Golden Lions	12
2	Rosko Specman	Pumas	11
3	Sampie Mastriet	Blue Bulls	9
3	Marnus Schoeman	Griquas	9
5	Wiaan Liebenberg	Blue Bulls	8
6	Manuel Montero	Pampas XV	7
7	Travis Ismaiel	Blue Bulls	6
7	Leon Karemaker	Griquas	6
7	Dries Swanepoel	Blue Bulls	6
10	Chrysander Botha	Golden Lions	5
10	Jaco Bouwer	Pumas	5
10	JW Bell	Pumas	5
10	Chris Cloete	Western Province	5
10	Danie Dames	Leopards XV	5
10	Frank Herne	Pumas	5
10	Rocco Jansen	Griquas	5
10	Vincent Koch	Pumas	5
10	Sizo Maseko	Sharks XV	5
10	Boom Prinsloo	Free State XV	5
10	Courtnall Skosan	Blue Bulls	5

Source: South African Rugby Union

=== Leading point scorers ===
Top 10 overall point scorers
Pos	Name	Team	Points
1	Fred Zeilinga	Sharks XV	154
2	Carl Bezuidenhout	Pumas	115
3	André Pretorius	Leopards XV	93
4	Tony Jantjies	Blue Bulls	79
5	Willie du Plessis	Blue Bulls	70
6	Marnitz Boshoff	Golden Lions	69
7	Santiago González Iglesias	Pampas XV	67
8	Karlo Aspeling	Border Bulldogs	66
9	Kurt Coleman	Western Province	63
10	Anthony Volmink	Golden Lions	62

Source: South African Rugby Union

== See also ==
- Vodacom Cup
- 2013 Currie Cup Premier Division
- 2013 Currie Cup First Division
