= Ntando Kebe =

South African rugby union player

- Full name: Ntando Lucky Kebe
- Born: 19 August 1988 (age 38) East London, South Africa
- Height: 1.79 m (5 ft 10 1/2 in)
- Weight: 80 kg (180 lb; 12 st 8 lb)
- School: Thubalethu High School
- University: University of Fort Hare

Rugby union career
- Position: Scrum-half
Youth career
- 2007–2009: Border Bulldogs
Amateur team(s)
Years	Team	Apps	(Points)
2011	UFH Blues		
Senior career
Years	Team	Apps	(Points)
2010–2012	Border Bulldogs	42	(20)
2013	Boland Cavaliers	21	(5)
2014	Griquas	2	(5)
2014–2015	Border Bulldogs	27	(15)
2016	Southern Kings	13	(0)
- Correct as of 18 July 2016
International career
Years	Team	Apps	(Points)
2012	South African Barbarians (South)	1	(0)
2013	South Africa President's XV	4	(0)
2016	South Africa 'A'	1	(0)
- Correct as of 19 June 2016

Ntando Lucky Kebe (born 19 August 1988) is a South African rugby union player, who most recently played domestic Currie Cup rugby with the Border Bulldogs and Super Rugby with the Southern Kings. His regular position is scrum-half.

== Career ==
=== Youth ===
He represented his local team the Border Bulldogs in the 2007 Under-19 Provincial Championship competition and at Under-21 level in 2007, 2008 and 2009.

=== Border Bulldogs ===
In 2010, he was included in the senior squad for the 2010 Vodacom Cup tournament and started the first game of the season, a 69–8 defeat to the Sharks. He quickly established himself as a regular for the senior side and played in both the Vodacom Cup and Currie Cup competitions between 2010 and 2012, accumulating 42 appearances in total.

=== Boland Cavaliers ===
After three seasons of senior rugby at the Border Bulldogs, he then moved to Wellington to join the Boland Cavaliers and played in all seven of their games in the 2013 Vodacom Cup competition.

=== Griquas ===
He joined Griquas for the 2014 season.

=== Border Bulldogs ===
At the start of 2016, Kebe was one of six Border Bulldogs players that joined the Southern Kings' Super Rugby squad for a trial period as they prepared for the 2016 Super Rugby season.

=== Representative rugby ===
In 2012, he was included in a South African Barbarians (South) team that faced England during the 2012 mid-year rugby test series. The following year, he was included in a South Africa President's XV team that played in the 2013 IRB Tbilisi Cup and won the tournament after winning all three matches.

In 2016, Kebe was included in a South Africa 'A' squad that played a two-match series against a touring England Saxons team. He didn't play in their first match in Bloemfontein, but was named on the bench for the second match of the series, coming on as a second-half replacement in a 26–29 defeat to the Saxons in George.

== Drugs ban ==
On 1 March 2016, Kebe provided an out-of-competition urine sample, which tested positively for prohibited substance stanozolol, and was officially charged with an anti-doping violation on 2 August 2017. He pleaded guilty, claiming that former team-mate Monde Hadebe gave him a supplement that contained the substance, and received a two-year ban with effect from 7 July 2016. Kebe launched an appeal against the decision, in which the appeals panel ruled that his ban should be changed from two years to four years, with Kebe allowed to return to rugby on 8 July 2020.
