= Mir Qasim (disambiguation) =

Mir Qasim (died 1777) was the Nawab of Bengal from 1760 to 1763.

Mir Qasim may also refer to:

== People ==
- Syed Mir Qasim (1921–2004), Indian politician, 2nd Chief Minister of Jammu and Kashmir
- Mir Quasem Mondal (1931–2024), Indian politician from West Bengal
- Mir Khasim Ali (born 1940), Indian table tennis player
- Mir Quasem Ali (1952–2016), Bangladeshi businessman, philanthropist and politician

== Places ==
- Mir Qasem, Afghanistan
- Deh-e Mir Qasem, Iran

== See also ==
- Mir (disambiguation)
- Qasim (disambiguation)
- Mir Ahmad Bin Quasem, Bangladeshi barrister and activist
- Rahmatullah Mir Qasmi, Indian Islamic scholar
