= Khwezi Mkhafu =

South African rugby union player

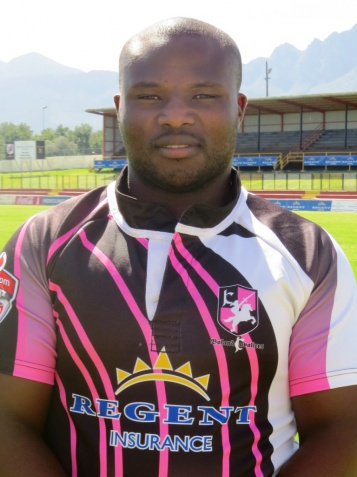
- Full name: Khwezilokusa Mkhafu
- Born: 17 June 1988 (age 38) Ngcobo
- Height: 1.77 m (5 ft 9 1/2 in)
- Weight: 97 kg (214 lb; 15 st 4 lb)
- School: Lebogang High School, Welkom

Rugby union career
- Position: Hooker
- Current team: Griffons (rugby union)
Youth career
- 2005–2008: Griffons
- 2009: Border Bulldogs
Senior career
Years	Team	Apps	(Points)
2010–2013	Border Bulldogs	70	(30)
2014	Boland Cavaliers	18	(5)
2015–2017	Griffons	54	(35)
2018–2020	Griquas	24	(20)
2021	Griffons	7	(5)
- Correct as of 27 March 2022
International career
Years	Team	Apps	(Points)
2013	South Africa President's XV	2	(5)
- Correct as of 17 June 2013

Khwezilokusa Mkhafu is a South African rugby union player for the Griffons (rugby union) in the Currie Cup and in the Rugby Challenge. His regular position is hooker or prop.

== Career ==
He came through the ranks of the Griffons, playing for them at Under-19 and Under-21 from 2005 to 2008. He then joined the Border Bulldogs, where he made his senior debut in the 2010 Vodacom Cup against Eastern Province and became a first team regular over the next three seasons.

In 2013, Mkhafu joined the Southern Kings training group prior to the 2013 Super Rugby season, but was later released to the Bulldogs' 2013 Vodacom Cup squad.

In 2013, he was included in a South Africa President's XV team that played in the 2013 IRB Tbilisi Cup and won the tournament after winning all three matches.

He also played Varsity Shield rugby for UFH Blues in 2011.
