= Joe Seerane =

South African rugby union player

- Full name: Johannes Seerane
- Born: 30 March 1987 (age 39) Acornhoek, South Africa
- Height: 1.73 m (5 ft 8 in)
- Weight: 86 kg (13 st 8 lb; 190 lb)
- School: Merensky High School, Tzaneen
- University: NWU Pukke

Rugby union career
- Position: Winger
- Current team: Rustenburg Impala
Youth career
- 2005: Limpopo Blue Bulls
- 2007–2008: Leopards
Amateur team(s)
Years	Team	Apps	(Points)
2010–2012	NWU Pukke	21	(10)
2015–present	Rustenburg Impala	5	(10)
Senior career
Years	Team	Apps	(Points)
2011	Leopards	1	(5)
2012–present	Border Bulldogs	12	(30)
- Correct as of 7 April 2015
International career
Years	Team	Apps	(Points)
2012	South Africa Students	2	(5)
- Correct as of 4 June 2013

Johannes Seerane (born 30 March 1987) is a South African rugby union player, currently playing with Rustenburg Impala. His regular position is winger.

== Career ==
=== Youth and Varsity rugby ===
He played for Limpopo Blue Bulls at the 2005 Under-18 Craven Week. He then moved to Potchefstroom, where he represented the Leopards in the Under-21 Provincial Championship competition in 2007 and 2008.

He also played for NWU Pukke in the 2010, 2011 and 2012 Varsity Cup competitions.

=== Leopards ===
He made his first class debut for the Leopards in the 2011 Vodacom Cup competition, starting in their match against Pampas XV and also scoring a 60th minute try. That was his only senior appearance for the Leopards.

=== Border Bulldogs ===
In 2012, he moved to East London to join the Border Bulldogs. He made three appearances, scoring two tries in the 2012 Currie Cup First Division. He was also a regular in the 2013 Vodacom Cup, scoring four tries in his seven appearances, making him the Bulldogs' top try scorer in that competition.

He picked up an injury prior to the 2013 IRB Tbilisi Cup (see below), which ruled him out for the entire 2013 Currie Cup First Division competition.

At the end of 2013, he was involved in a serious car accident that saw him sustain burn injuries and saw him admitted to hospital in a serious condition.

=== Rustenburg Impala ===
He returned to Rustenburg in 2015 to sign for club side and defending SARU Community Cup champions, Rustenburg Impala.

=== Representative rugby ===
He was named in a South African Students and a South African Students Sevens side in 2012.

In 2013, he was initially included in a South Africa President's XV team to play in the 2013 IRB Tbilisi Cup, but had to withdraw through injury,
