= Brian Shabangu =

South African rugby union player

- Full name: Simphiwe Brian Shabangu
- Born: 11 April 1988 (age 38) Durban, South Africa
- Height: 1.75 m (5 ft 9 in)
- Weight: 96 kg (15 st 2 lb; 212 lb)
- School: Glenwood High School
- University: University of South Africa

Rugby union career
- Position: Flanker
Youth career
- 2004–2008: Sharks
Amateur team(s)
| Years | Team | Apps | (Points) |
| 2013 | NMMU Madibaz | 6 | (5) |
Senior career
| Years | Team | Apps | (Points) |
| 2012–2013 | Border Bulldogs | 26 | (20) |
| 2014–2018 | Pumas | 43 | (35) |
| 2014 | → Falcons | 1 | (0) |
- Correct as of 16 July 2018
International career
| Years | Team | Apps | (Points) |
| 2013 | South Africa President's XV | 2 | (0) |
- Correct as of 17 June 2013

Simphiwe Brian Shabangu (born 16 May 2013) is a South African rugby union player who last played for the Pumas in the Currie Cup and in the Rugby Challenge. His regular position is flanker.

== Career ==
=== Youth and Varsity rugby ===
Shabangu came through the Sharks youth system, playing for their Under–16 team at the 2004 Grant Khomo Week, for the Under–18s at the 2005 Academy Week and for the Under–21 team in the 2008 Under-21 Provincial Championship.

At the start of 2013, Shabangu played Varsity Cup rugby for the NMMU Madibaz, who reached their first ever semi-final in this competition.

=== Border Bulldogs ===
Shabangu signed for the Border Bulldogs in time for the 2012 Currie Cup First Division season and instantly became a regular in the senior side, making his debut in the first game of the season against the SWD Eagles and playing in all fourteen games of the season, starting thirteen of them.

Shabangu only played in two 2013 Vodacom Cup matches due to his Varsity Cup duties, but returned to the Bulldogs make a further ten appearances in the 2013 Currie Cup First Division, scoring two tries.

=== Pumas ===
Shabangu left the Bulldogs at the end of the 2013 season to join Nelspruit-based side the Pumas. He was a member of the Pumas side that won the Vodacom Cup for the first time in 2015, beating Western Province 24–7 in the final. Shabangu made nine appearances during the season, scoring two tries.

=== Sevens and Representative rugby ===
Shabangu also played some sevens rugby, playing for the Sharks sevens team in 2009 and 2010 and captaining a South African Emerging Sevens team in the Safaricom Sevens tournament in 2011.

In 2013, Shabangu was included in a South Africa President's XV team that played in the 2013 IRB Tbilisi Cup and won the tournament after winning all three matches.
