= Martin Dreyer (rugby union) =

South African rugby union player

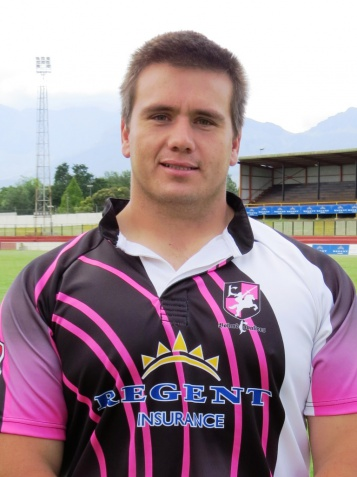
- Full name: Marthinus Christoffel Dreyer
- Born: 25 August 1988 (age 38) Rustenburg, South Africa
- Height: 1.84 m (6 ft 1/2 in)
- Weight: 125 kg (276 lb; 19 st 10 lb)
- School: Hoërskool Wonderboom, Pretoria
- University: NWU Pukke

Rugby union career
- Position: Prop
Youth career
- 2006: Blue Bulls
- 2007–2009: Leopards
Amateur team(s)
Years	Team	Apps	(Points)
2010–2013	NWU Pukke (Varsity Cup)	18	(10)
Senior career
Years	Team	Apps	(Points)
2011–2013	Leopards	13	(5)
2013	Leopards XV	4	(0)
2014–2015	Boland Cavaliers	19	(5)
2014	Stormers	5	(0)
2015–2016	Dax	10	(0)
2016–2017	Blue Bulls XV	4	(0)
2016	Blue Bulls	8	(0)
2017	Bulls	3	(0)
2017–2018	Southern Kings	7	(0)
2019–	Slava Moscow		
- Correct as of 27 October 2018
International career
Years	Team	Apps	(Points)
2013	South African Universities	1	(0)
2013	South Africa President's XV	4	(0)
- Correct as of 17 June 2013

Marthinus Christoffel Dreyer (born 25 August 1988) is a South African rugby union player who last played for the Southern Kings in the Pro14. His regular position is prop.

== Career ==
=== Youth ===
After representing the Blue Bulls at the 2006 Under-18 Academy Week youth tournament, he then joined Potchefstroom-based side the Leopards and represented them in the Under-19 Provincial Championship tournament in 2007 and the Under-19 Provincial Championship tournament in 2008 and 2009.

=== Leopards ===
He made his first class debut for the Leopards in the 2011 Vodacom Cup competition against the Boland Cavaliers and also played against Western Province that season. He didn't appear for them in 2012, but did play in four matches in the 2013 Vodacom Cup tournament.

=== Boland Cavaliers ===
He joined Boland Cavaliers for the start of 2014.

=== Representative rugby ===
In 2013, he was included in a South Africa President's XV team that played in the 2013 IRB Tbilisi Cup and won the tournament after winning all three matches.

=== Dax ===
He joined French side Dax for the 2015–16 Rugby Pro D2 season.

=== Blue Bulls ===
He returned to South Africa after one season in France to join the Blue Bulls.

=== Slava Moscow ===
In 2019 he joined Russian Slava Moscow club.

=== Varsity Rugby ===
He also represented the NWU Pukke in Varsity Cup rugby between 2010 and 2013.
