= Jimmy Stonehouse =

- Full name: James Stonehouse
- Born: 30 March 1964 (age 62) Krugersdorp, South Africa
- Height: 1.75 m (5 ft 9 in)
- Weight: 100 kg (15 st 10 lb; 220 lb)

Rugby union career
Coaching career
- Years: Team
- 1990–1992: Pumas Craven Week
- 1990–1997: Hoërskool Ermelo
- 1994–1997: Pumas Craven Week
- 1998–2008: Hoërskool Waterkloof
- 2000–2001: Russia U19
- 2000: Russia Sevens
- 2002–2003: Blue Bulls Craven Week
- 2005–2007: Pretoria Harlequins
- 2007–2008: Blue Bulls Craven Week
- 2008–2015: Pumas
- 2009: Royal XV (assistant)
- 2012: South African Barbarians (North)
- 2013: South Africa President's XV
- 2015–2017: Toshiba Brave Lupus
- 2018–present: Pumas

James Stonehouse (born in Krugersdorp, South Africa) is a South African rugby union coach who is the head coach of the Pumas.

== Rugby union ==
=== Early career ===
As a player, Stonehouse played hooker for South Eastern Transvaal. During his playing days, he was also a teacher at Hoërskool Ermelo between 1984 and 1997 and achieved success coaching their first team, guiding them to the Quarter Finals of the Director's Trophy in 1992 and to the Semi-Finals of the same competition in 1993. He was also the coach of the South Eastern Transvaal's Craven Week (Under-18) side from 1990 to 1992 and from 1994 to 1997.

He joined Pretoria-based secondary school Hoërskool Waterkloof as their Director of Rugby from the start of 1998, guiding them to the Blue Bulls high school championship in 2003, the first time in 12 years. He also coached the Blue Bulls' Craven Week team in 2003 and 2004.

During this time, he also coached the Russia Under-19 team that participated at the FIRA European U19 Tournament in France, guiding them to victory in the Plate competition. He also coached the Russia Sevens side as they qualified for the 2001 Rugby World Cup Sevens tournament in Argentina. He was appointed as head coach of the Russia national team, but returned to South Africa shortly afterwards for family reasons.

In 2004, Stonehouse joined club side Pretoria Harlequins in the Blue Bulls' Carlton League competition, guiding them to the Semi-Finals in 2006, the first time in 22 years they achieved that feat. He also appointed as Blue Bulls' Craven Week coach for 2007 and 2008.

In 2005 and 2006, he also coached the Blue Bulls' Women's Sevens side and the Women's national Sevens side that won the Africa tournament held in Uganda.

=== Pumas ===
Stonehouse got his big breakthrough in 2008, when he was appointed as the head coach of the Pumas.

=== Toshiba Brave Lupus ===
In January 2015, Stonehouse announced his decision to leave the Pumas after seven years with the side to join Japanese Top League side Toshiba Brave Lupus in April of the same year.

=== Representative sides ===
He also had short spells coaching sides on a short-term basis; he was one of the coaches of the Royal XV that played against the British & Irish Lions during the 2009 British & Irish Lions tour to South Africa, the South African Barbarians (North) side that faced England during the 2012 England rugby union tour of South Africa and of the South Africa President's XV side that won the 2013 IRB Tbilisi Cup.

== Bodybuilding ==
Stonehouse also took part in bodybuilding competitions. He won the Mr South Africa competition in 2005 and came sixth in the Mr Universe competition in 2006.

== Net Worth ==
Stonehouse currently has a net worth of $1.5 Million (USD) or €1.467 Million (Euros.)
