= Marius Coetzer =

South African rugby union player

- Born: 4 April 1984 (age 42) Pretoria, South Africa
- Height: 1.99 m (6 ft 6 1/2 in)
- Weight: 113 kg (17 st 11 lb; 249 lb)
- School: Hoërskool Waterkloof
- University: UNISA

Rugby union career
- Position: Lock
Youth career
- 2005: Blue Bulls
Amateur team(s)
Years	Team	Apps	(Points)
2006	Maties		
Senior career
Years	Team	Apps	(Points)
2005	Blue Bulls	1	(0)
2006	Western Province	5	(0)
2007–2008	Falcons	26	(0)
2009–2015	Pumas	100	(55)
2012	Lions	5	(0)
2013	→ Stormers	1	(0)
2005–2015	Total	138	(55)
- Correct as of 9 October 2015

Marius Coetzer (born 4 April 1984) is a former South African rugby union footballer whose regular playing position was lock.

He played first class rugby in South Africa between 2005 and 2015 and spent the majority of his career at the Pumas, making exactly 100 appearances for the team from 2009 until he retired at the end of the 2015 season.

He started his career in 2005 with the Blue Bulls before spending a season in Cape Town with Western Province. He then moved to East Rand side the Falcons where he played in 2007 and 2008 before joining the Pumas.

He also played in six Super Rugby matches, making five appearances for the Lions in 2012 and a single appearance for the Stormers in 2013.

In 2013, he was initially included in a South Africa President's XV team to play in the 2013 IRB Tbilisi Cup, but withdrew after he linked up with the Stormers during the 2013 Super Rugby season.

He was a member of the Pumas side that won the Vodacom Cup for the first time in 2015, beating Western Province 24–7 in the final. Coetzer made six appearances during the season.
