= Rosko Specman =

South African rugby union player (born 1989)

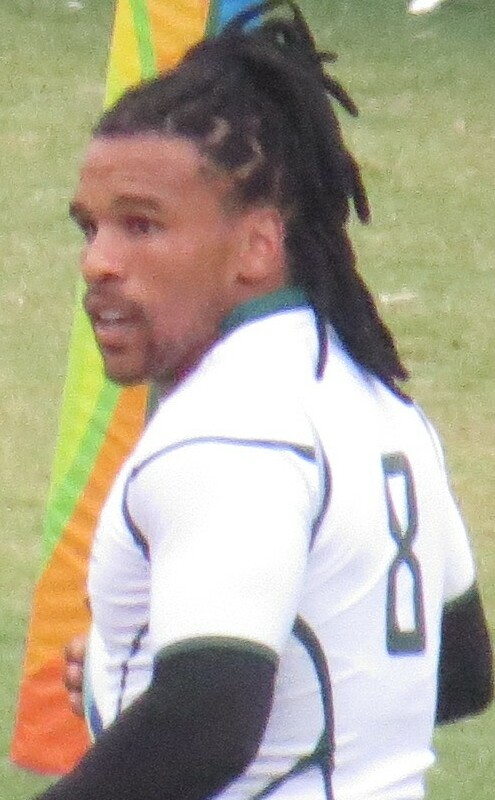
- Specman in 2016
- Full name: Rosko Shane Specman
- Born: 28 April 1989 (age 37) Grahamstown, South Africa
- Height: 1.76 m (5 ft 9 in)
- Weight: 85 kg
- School: [Mary Water's High School

Rugby union career
- Position: Winger
- Current team: Cobras Brasil Rugby
Youth career
- 2007–2008: Eastern Province Kings
- 2009–2010: Sharks
Senior career
Years	Team	Apps	(Points)
2010–2012	Sharks XV	13	(25)
2012	Sharks (Currie Cup)	1	(0)
2013–2015	Pumas	45	(140)
2017	Free State Cheetahs	7	(10)
2017	Cheetahs	4	(5)
2019–2020	Bulls	19	(47)
2019	Blue Bulls XV	1	(0)
2019	Blue Bulls	6	(25)
2020–2022	Cheetahs	5	(20)
2020–2022	Free State Cheetahs	14	(20)
2021	→ Stormers (loan)	1	(0)
2023–2025	Griquas		
2025	Kalinga Black Tigers		
2026–	Cobras Brasil Rugby		
- Correct as of 13 March 2023
International career
Years	Team	Apps	(Points)
2013	South Africa President's XV	3	(5)
2014–2018	South Africa Sevens	150	(380)
2021	South Africa	1	(0)
- Correct as of 3 July 2021
Medal record
Men's rugby sevens
Representing South Africa
Rugby World Cup Sevens
Bronze medal – third place	2018 San Francisco	Team competition
Olympic Games
Bronze medal – third place	2016 Rio de Janeiro	Team competition
Bronze medal – third place	2024 Paris	Team competition
Africa Men's Sevens
Silver medal – second place	2024 Mauritius	Team competition

Rosko Shane Specman (Note: There are different spellings of Specman's name in use. The South African Rugby Union website lists his name as Rosko Specman, which is also used during television coverage, but several other website lists his name as Rosco Speckman. Both variants yield several search results from reliable sources. Although an interview in 2016 suggested that his preferred spelling of his name is Roscko Speckman, the player confirmed in July 2017 via Twitter that the correct spelling is Rosko Specman.@@speckmagic11 (31 July 2017). "A lot of people get it wrong... It's Rosko Specman" (Tweet) – via Twitter.) (born 28 April 1989) is a South African rugby union player for the Cobras Brasil Rugby in the Super Rugby Americas.

He played rugby sevens for the South Africa national rugby sevens team between 2014 and 2018 and also played Currie Cup rugby with the Sharks from 2010 to 2012, the Pumas from 2013 to 2015 and the Free State Cheetahs in 2017. His usual position is winger.

Specman was a member of the South African Sevens team that won a bronze medal at the 2016 Summer Olympics.

== Rugby career ==
=== Youth ===
At youth level, Specman played at the 2007 U18 Academy Week for Eastern Province Country Districts and then for the Mighty Elephants (now Eastern Province Kings) U19 team in the 2008 U19 Currie Cup competition.

=== Vodacom Cup ===
In 2009, Specman moved to the Sharks, where he played in their U19 team. He made his debut for the Sharks in the 2010 Vodacom Cup quarter final game against Griquas. He was a first choice player in the U21 team that year, scoring three tries. The following season, he scored four tries in five appearances in the 2011 Vodacom Cup and made another five appearances in the 2012 Vodacom Cup.

Specman joined the Pumas for the 2013 season. He was a member of the Pumas side that won the Vodacom Cup for the first time in 2015, beating Western Province 24–7 in the final. His only appearance during the season came in the final after returning from South Africa Sevens duty.

=== Representative rugby ===
In 2013, Specman was included in a South Africa President's XV team that played in the 2013 IRB Tbilisi Cup and won the tournament after winning all three matches.

Specman was also called into a South Africa Sevens training squad in 2013 and was included in the Sevens squad for the USA leg of the 2013–14 IRB Sevens World Series. Specman was included in a 12-man squad for the 2016 Summer Olympics in Rio de Janeiro. He was named as a substitute for their first match in Group B of the competition against Spain, with South Africa winning the match 24–0.

He competed for South Africa at the 2024 Summer Olympics in Paris. They defeated Australia to win the bronze medal final.

=== Cheetahs ===
Along with sevens teammates Cecil Afrika and Chris Dry, Specman announced that he was joining the Cheetahs beginning in 2017. He scored his first Pro14 try at home in October 2017 against the Glasgow Warriors.

=== Bulls ===
On 10 October 2018, it was announced that Specman would join the Bulls in Super Rugby and the Blue Bulls in the Currie Cup from 2019, following the completion of his commitments with the South Africa national rugby sevens team.
