= Michael van der Spuy =

South African rugby union player

- Full name: Michael George van der Spuy
- Born: 20 February 1991 (age 35) Bethlehem, South Africa
- Height: 1.80 m (5 ft 11 in)
- Weight: 91 kg (14 st 5 lb; 201 lb)
- School: Grey College, Bloemfontein
- University: University of Stellenbosch

Rugby union career
- Position: Centre
Youth career
- 2010–2012: Western Province
Senior career
Years	Team	Apps	(Points)
2011–2014	Western Province	36	(35)
2014	Stormers	4	(0)
2015–2017	Cheetahs	18	(15)
2015	Griquas	9	(5)
2016–2017	Free State XV	6	(13)
2016–2017	Free State Cheetahs	3	(5)
2016–2017	Total	76	(73)
- Correct as of 22 April 2018

Michael George van der Spuy (born 20 February 1991) is a South African former rugby union player who played Super Rugby with the Stormers and the Cheetahs, and Currie Cup rugby with Western Province, Griquas and the Free State Cheetahs. His regular position was centre. He retired in 2017 on medical advice.

== Career ==
=== Youth ===
Van der Spuy played for the Western Province U19 side in the 2010 Under-19 Provincial Championship competition and for Western Province U21 in the 2011 Under-21 Provincial Championship and 2012 Under-21 Provincial Championship competitions.

=== Western Province ===
Van der Spuy made his first-class debut for Western Province during the 2011 Vodacom Cup competition, starting in the match against the Pumas and scoring a try within seven minutes. He made one more substitute appearance in the competition, the following week against the Leopards.

Van der Spuy's Currie Cup debut came a few months later during the 2011 Currie Cup Premier Division season, when he came on as a substitute in Western Province's match against the Golden Lions in Johannesburg. That was his only Currie Cup appearance in 2011, reverting to the U21 squad for the remainder of the season.

The following season, he made eight appearances in the 2012 Vodacom Cup competition, scoring one try. Injuries restricted his playing time in the Currie Cup season, however.

Another eight appearances (and three tries) followed in the 2013 Vodacom Cup and he was included in the 2013 Currie Cup Premier Division squad.

=== Griquas ===
Van der Spuy joined Kimberley-based side Griquas before the 2015 season.

=== Free State Cheetahs ===
Van der Spuy signed a contract to join Bloemfontein-based side Free State Cheetahs before the 2016 season on a two-year contract.
