= Qasim =

Qasim, Qasem, Casim and Cassiem may refer to:

- Qasim (name), a given name of Arabic origin and the name of several people
- Port Qasim, port in Karachi, Pakistan
- Kasım and Casim, respectively the Ottoman Turkish and Romanian names for General Toshevo, a town in northeastern Bulgaria

== See also ==
- Bin Qasim (disambiguation)
- Al-Qassim Province, Saudi Arabia
- Qasim Khanate, Tatar Kingdom in medieval Russia
- Cacém (disambiguation), a Portuguese toponym derived from Qasim
- Cassiem, South African surname
- Kasim (disambiguation)
- Kazem or Kazim, given names
- Qasymbek, a given name
