= Bin Qasim =

Bin Qasim can refer to either:

- Muhammad bin Qasim the eighth-century Syrian general.
- Bin Qasim Town in Karachi, Pakistan, which is named after Muhammad bin Qasim

== See also ==
- Bin (disambiguation)
- Qasim (disambiguation)
