= Fred Zeilinga =

South African rugby union player

- Full name: Frederik Johannes Zeilinga
- Born: 11 December 1992 (age 33) Ladysmith, South Africa
- Height: 1.75 m (5 ft 9 in)
- Weight: 82 kg (181 lb; 12 st 13 lb)
- School: Glenwood High School, Durban

Rugby union career
- Position: Fly-half
- Current team: Sharks / Sharks (Currie Cup)
Youth career
- 2005–2012: Sharks
Senior career
Years	Team	Apps	(Points)
2011–2015	Sharks XV	23	(207)
2011–2015	Sharks (Currie Cup)	18	(180)
2013–2015	Sharks	11	(55)
2015–2016	Free State Cheetahs	17	(151)
2016–2018	Cheetahs	39	(273)
2018–2020	Canon Eagles	17	(83)
2021–2022	Lions	8	(50)
2021–2022	Golden Lions	12	(15)
2022–	→ Sharks		
2023–	Sharks (Currie Cup)		
- Correct as of 20 September 2022
International career
Years	Team	Apps	(Points)
2017	South Africa 'A'	2	(18)
- Correct as of 22 April 2018

Frederik Johannes Zeilinga (born 11 December 1992) is a South African rugby union player for Canon Eagles in the Japanese Top League. His regular position is fly-half.

== Career ==
=== Youth ===
Zeilinga represented the Sharks at Under-13, Under-16, Under-18, Under-19 and Under-21 levels between 2005 and 2012.

=== Sharks ===
In 2011, he made his first class debut for them in the Vodacom Cup competition in the season-opening game against the Blue Bulls. He missed a conversion two minutes after coming on, but did convert one ten minutes later to help his team to a 30–19 victory.

He made three more substitute appearances during 2011 and was promoted to first choice fly-half for the Sharks during the 2012 Vodacom Cup competition, making a further seven starts. He also finished as top scorer in the 2012 Under-21 Provincial Championship, scoring 154 points in his ten appearances.

He also took over the kicking duties during the 2013 Vodacom Cup competition, where he once again scored in excess of 100 points in the season.

=== Sharks ===
He was included in the Sharks squad for their final match of the 2013 Super Rugby season against the Southern Kings. He did appear as a substitute to make his Super Rugby debut and also scored a try in a 58–13 victory.

=== Cheetahs ===
In May 2015, Zeilinga signed a contract to join Bloemfontein-based outfit the Free State Cheetahs.
