= South Africa President's XV =

- Union: South African Rugby Union
- Founded: 2013
- Coach(es): Jimmy Stonehouse
- Captain(s): Brendon Snyman
- Top scorer: Carl Bezuidenhout (25)
- Most tries: Uzair Cassiem (2)
- League(s): IRB Tbilisi Cup
- 2013: Champions

The South Africa President's XV is a South African rugby union team that represented South Africa in the 2013 IRB Tbilisi Cup. They won the tournament, winning all three matches, but did not take part in the 2014 edition.

Previously, an Emerging Springboks team competed in the 2007 and 2008 IRB Nations Cup competitions.

== History ==
The team was created following the IRB's decision to create the Tbilisi Cup, to be held in Tbilisi, Georgia in 2013.

The team consisted of players playing in the First Division (second tier) of the South African domestic Currie Cup competition. First Division players have previously been selected for South African Barbarians teams that played against England during the 2012 mid-year rugby test series.

=== 2013 IRB Tbilisi Cup ===
The South Africa President's XV emerged victorious at the 2013 IRB Tbilisi Cup with an undefeated record, beating Uruguay, Emerging Ireland and Georgia. Loose-forward Uzair Cassiem ended joint top try scorer with two tries, while fly-half Carl Bezuidenhout ended third in the points scoring charts with 25 points.

== Squad ==
The following squad was named to compete in the 2013 IRB Tbilisi Cup:

Props: (South Africa) Martin Dreyer; (South Africa) Ivann Espag; (South Africa) Vincent Koch; (South Africa) Khwezi Mkhafu; Hookers: (South Africa) Ashton Constant; (South Africa) Frank Herne; Locks: (South Africa) Giant Mtyanda; (South Africa) Brendon Snyman (c); (South Africa) Eduan van der Walt	Loose forwards: (South Africa) Renaldo Bothma; (South Africa) Jaco Bouwer; (South Africa) Uzair Cassiem; (South Africa) Zandré Jordaan; (South Africa) Brian Shabangu; Scrum-halves: (South Africa) Ntando Kebe; (South Africa) Sino Nyoka; Fly-halves: (South Africa) Carl Bezuidenhout; (South Africa) Ricardo Croy	Centres: (South Africa) Adriaan Engelbrecht; (South Africa) Trompie Pretorius; (South Africa) Stefan Watermeyer; Wingers: (South Africa) Alshaun Bock; (South Africa) Wilmaure Louw; (South Africa) Rosko Specman; Fullbacks: (South Africa) Jacquin Jansen; (South Africa) Coenie van Wyk; Head coach: (South Africa) Jimmy Stonehouse

Note: Marius Coetzer, Hoffmann Maritz and Joe Seerane were initially named in the squad, but were replaced by Eduan van der Walt, Stefan Watermeyer and Coenie van Wyk. In addition, Vince Gwavu and Inus Kritzinger were initially named, but not named in the final squad.

== See also ==
- Emerging Springboks
- South African Barbarians
