= Cassiem =

Cassiem is a South African surname that may refer to:

- Aishah Cassiem (born 1992 or 1993), South African politician
- Dayaan Cassiem (born 1998), South African field hockey player
- Junaid Cassiem (born 1993), South African former cricketer
- Mustapha Cassiem (born 2002), South African field hockey player
- Uzair Cassiem (born 1990), South African rugby union player
