= Frank Herne =

South African rugby union player (born 1989)

- Born: 31 October 1989 (age 37) Ficksburg, South Africa
- Height: 1.78 m (5 ft 10 in)
- Weight: 101 kg (223 lb; 15 st 13 lb)
- School: Grey College, Bloemfontein
- University: University of the Free State

Rugby union career
- Position: Hooker
Youth career
- 2005–2010: Free State Cheetahs
Amateur team(s)
Years	Team	Apps	(Points)
2009	UFS Shimlas	2	(0)
Senior career
Years	Team	Apps	(Points)
2010	Free State Cheetahs	0	(0)
2011–2012	Eastern Province Kings	39	(20)
2013–2018	Pumas	101	(195)
- Correct as of 27 October 2018
International career
Years	Team	Apps	(Points)
2007	S.A. Schools Academy		
2011	South African Kings	3	(0)
2013	South Africa President's XV	4	(0)
- Correct as of 17 June 2013

Frank Herne (born 31 October 1989) is a South African rugby union player who last played for the Pumas in the Currie Cup and in the Rugby Challenge. He usually plays the position of Hooker.

Herne is a product of Grey College and featured for the South African Schools Academy side in 2007. He played in the 2009 FNB Varsity Cup for Shimlas and was part of the Free State Cheetahs squad for the 2010 Vodacom Cup.

Herne played for the Eastern Province Kings between 2011 and 2012, but joined the Pumas in 2013.

In 2013, Herne was included in a South Africa President's XV team that played in the 2013 IRB Tbilisi Cup and won the tournament after winning all three matches.

Herne was a member of the Pumas side that won the Vodacom Cup for the first time in 2015, beating Western Province 24–7 in the final. Herne made just one appearances during the season, coming on as a replacement in the final.
