= 2010 Vodacom Cup =

- Champions: Blue Bulls
- Matches played: 59
- Top point scorer: Monty Dumond
- Top try scorer: Jaco Bouwer

The 2010 Vodacom Cup was contested from 26 February to 7 May. The 2010 Vodacom Cup is the 13th edition of this annual domestic cup competition. The Vodacom Cup is played between provincial rugby union teams in South Africa from the Currie Cup Premier and First Divisions, as well as two invitational teams, the Welwitschias from Namibia and the Pampas XV from Argentina.

== Teams ==
Location of teams in 2010 Vodacom Cup

The following teams took part in the 2010 Vodacom Cup competition:

=== Northern Section ===
- Blue Bulls
- Golden Lions
- Griffons
- Griquas
- Leopards
- Pumas
- Falcons
- Welwitschias (Namibia)

=== Southern Section ===
- Boland Cavaliers
- Border Bulldogs
- Eastern Province
- Free State
- Pampas XV (Argentina)
- Sharks XV
- SWD Eagles
- Western Province

== Tables ==
=== Northern Section ===
2010 Vodacom Cup Northern Section Table
	Team	Played	Won	Drawn	Lost	Points For	Points Against	Points Difference	Tries For	Tries Against	Try Bonus	Losing Bonus	Points
1	Blue Bulls	7	7	0	0	251	136	+115	34	13	4	0	32
2	Golden Lions	7	5	0	2	245	125	+120	30	13	4	2	26
3	Griquas	7	5	0	2	263	184	+79	39	24	5	1	26
4	Leopards	7	4	0	3	245	164	+81	33	20	4	1	21
5	Pumas	7	4	0	3	240	163	+77	32	17	4	1	21
6	Griffons	7	2	0	5	181	306	-125	23	45	3	0	11
7	Welwitschias	7	1	0	6	194	300	-106	23	42	2	1	7
8	Falcons	7	0	0	7	116	357	-241	15	55	2	0	2
Updated 17 Apr 2010; The top 4 teams will qualify for the quarter-finals. Points breakdown: *4 points for a win *2 points for a draw *1 bonus point for a loss by seven points or less *1 bonus point for scoring four or more tries in a match

=== Southern Section ===
2010 Vodacom Cup Southern Section Table
	Team	Played	Won	Drawn	Lost	Points For	Points Against	Points Difference	Tries For	Tries Against	Try Bonus	Losing Bonus	Points
1	Boland Cavaliers	7	5	0	2	206	160	+46	26	14	4	0	24
2	Sharks XV	7	5	0	2	214	131	+83	23	12	1	2	23
3	Free State	7	5	0	2	195	150	+45	24	14	3	0	23
4	Western Province	7	5	0	2	171	142	+29	18	15	2	0	22
5	Pampas XV	7	3	1	3	220	151	+69	29	16	4	2	20
6	Eastern Province	7	2	1	4	159	194	-35	18	23	1	2	13
7	SWD Eagles	7	2	0	5	151	176	-25	17	26	1	3	12
8	Border Bulldogs	7	0	0	7	115	327	-212	15	50	2	1	3
Updated 17 Apr 2010; The top 4 teams will qualify for the quarter-finals. Points breakdown: *4 points for a win *2 points for a draw *1 bonus point for a loss by seven points or less *1 bonus point for scoring four or more tries in a match

== Results ==
=== Northern Section ===
==== Round 1 ====
2010-02-26

Griquas	17 - 22	Blue Bulls
Try: Albertus Buckle, Coenie van Wyk; Con: Coenie van Wyk (2); Pen: Coenie van Wyk		Try: Okkie Kruger, Ruan Snyman; Pen: Francois Brummer (2); Drop: Francois Brummer, Marnitz Boshoff

AR Abass Stadium, Kimberley
Attendance: 500

2010-02-26

Pumas	52 - 17	Falcons

Puma Stadium, Witbank

2010-02-27

Welwitschias	26 - 45	Griffons

Hage Geingob Stadium, Windhoek

2010-02-27

Golden Lions	27 - 22	Leopards

Johannesburg Stadium, Johannesburg

==== Round 2 ====
2010-03-05

Blue Bulls	29 - 15	Pumas
Try: Deon Helberg, Okkie Kruger, Stefan Watermeyer, Zane Botha; Con: Francois Brummer (2), Marnitz Boshoff; Pen: Francois Brummer	Report	Try: Eduan Van Der Walt, Jaco Bouwer; Con: Braam Pretorius; Pen: Braam Pretorius

Loftus Versfeld, Pretoria
Attendance: 2000

2010-03-05

Leopards	52 - 11	Welwitschias

Olën Park, Potchefstroom

2010-03-05

Griffons	31 - 59	Griquas

North West Stadium, Welkom

2010-03-06

Falcons	13 - 34	Golden Lions

John Vorster High School, Nigel

==== Round 3 ====
2010-03-12

Leopards	59 - 8	Falcons

Royal Bafokeng Stadium, Rustenburg

2010-03-12

Pumas	66 - 14	Griffons

Puma Stadium, Witbank

2010-03-13

Welwitschias	27 - 29	Griquas

Hage Geingob Stadium, Windhoek

2010-03-13

Golden Lions	22 - 27	Blue Bulls
Try: Hansie van Dyk; Con: Herkie Kruger; Pen: Herkie Kruger (5)		Try: Devin Oosthuizen, Dries van Schalkwyk (2); Con: Francois Brummer (3); Pen: Francois Brummer (2)

Raiders Rugby Club, Johannesburg
Attendance: 1000

==== Round 4 ====
2010-03-19

Griquas	42 - 26	Pumas

AR Abass Stadium, Kimberley

2010-03-19

Blue Bulls	25 - 15	Leopards
Try: Dean Greyling, John Mametsa, Zane Botha; Con: Francois Brummer (2); Pen: Francois Brummer; Drop: Francois Brummer		Pen: Clayton Durand (5)

Loftus Versfeld, Pretoria
Attendance: 2000

2010-03-19

Welwitschias	66 - 35	Falcons

Hage Geingob Stadium, Windhoek

2010-03-19

Griffons	16 - 48	Golden Lions

North West Stadium, Welkom

==== Round 5 ====
2010-03-26

Golden Lions	45 - 5	Griquas

Johannesburg Stadium, Johannesburg

2010-03-26

Leopards	43 - 13	Griffons

Olën Park, Potchefstroom

2010-03-27

Pumas	30 - 10	Welwitschias

Nelspruit Rugby Club, Nelspruit

2010-03-27

Falcons	7 - 50	Blue Bulls
Try: Juan Palm; Con: Deon Anderson		Try: Deon Helberg, Gerrit-Jan van Velze, Marnitz Boshoff, Ruan Snyman, Stefan Watermeyer, Tiger Mangweni, Vainon Willis (2); Con: Marnitz Boshoff (5)

Barnard Stadium, Kempton Park

==== Round 6 ====
2010-04-09

Griquas	51 - 21	Leopards

AR Abass Stadium, Kimberley

2010-04-09

Griffons	36 - 24	Falcons

North West Stadium, Welkom

2010-04-09

Pumas	22 - 18	Golden Lions

Lilian Ngoyi Stadium, Secunda

2010-04-10

Welwitschias	34 - 58	Blue Bulls
Try: Chrysander Botha, Darryl de la Harpe, Heini Bock, Heinz Koll; Con: Chrysander Botha (2), Eugene Jantjies (2); Pen: Eugene Jantjies (2)		Try: Akona Ndungane, Danie Faasen, Francois Brummer, John Mametsa, Morné Mellett, Ruan Snyman, Stefan Watermeyer (2), Vince Gwavu; Con: Marnitz Boshoff (3), Stefan Watermeyer (2); Pen: Stefan Watermeyer

Hage Geingob Stadium, Windhoek
Attendance: 2500

==== Round 7 ====
2010-04-16

Golden Lions	51 - 20	Welwitschias

Johannesburg Stadium, Johannesburg

2010-04-16

Leopards	33 - 29	Pumas

Olën Park, Potchefstroom

2010-04-17

Falcons	12 - 60	Griquas

Barnard Stadium, Kempton Park

2010-04-17

Blue Bulls	40 - 26	Griffons
Try: Deon Helberg, Marnitz Boshoff, Okkie Kruger, Stefan Watermeyer, Tiger Mangweni; Con: Stefan Watermeyer (3), Francois Brummer (2); Pen: Stefan Watermeyer		Try: Eddie Fredericks, Jaco Meyer, Virgil Russel; Con: Pieter Myburgh; Pen: Pieter Myburgh (3)

Super Stadium, Atteridgeville
Attendance: 562

=== Southern Section ===
==== Round 1 ====
2010-02-26

Sharks XV	69 - 8	Border Bulldogs

ABSA Park, Durban

2010-02-26

Eastern Province	27 - 27	Pampas XV

Nelson Mandela Bay Stadium, Port Elizabeth

2010-02-27

Boland Cavaliers	37 - 28	Western Province

Bredasdorp

2010-02-27

SWD Eagles	13 - 22	Free State

Saasveld, George

==== Round 2 ====
2010-03-06

Western Province	26 - 23	Sharks XV

Newlands Stadium, Cape Town

2010-03-06

Border Bulldogs	32 - 34	Eastern Province

Queen's College, Queenstown, Eastern Cape

2010-03-06

Free State	37 - 29	Boland Cavaliers

Vodacom Park, Bloemfontein

2010-04-07 (rescheduled)

Pampas XV	36 - 17	SWD Eagles

Van der Stel Rugby Club, Stellenbosch

==== Round 3 ====
2010-03-13

Eastern Province	23 - 28	Western Province

EPRU Stadium, Port Elizabeth

2010-03-13

Sharks XV	26 - 17	Free State

Empangeni Rugby Club, Empangeni

2010-03-13

Boland Cavaliers	25 - 24	SWD Eagles

Saldanha Rugby Club, Saldanha

2010-03-13

Pampas XV	73 - 14	Border Bulldogs

Newlands Stadium, Cape Town

==== Round 4 ====
2010-03-19

Free State	25 - 16	Eastern Province

Shimla Park, Bloemfontein

2010-03-19

Boland Cavaliers	26 - 13	Pampas XV

Boland Stadium, Wellington

2010-03-20

Western Province	29 - 0	Border Bulldogs

Newlands Stadium, Cape Town

2010-03-20

SWD Eagles	16 - 10	Sharks XV

Bridgton Sports Grounds, Oudtshoorn

==== Round 5 ====
2010-03-26

Eastern Province	24 - 19	SWD Eagles

EPRU Stadium, Port Elizabeth

2010-03-26

Sharks XV	35 - 20	Boland Cavaliers

Woodburn Stadium, Pietermaritzburg

2010-03-27

Border Bulldogs	18 - 50	Free State

Sisa Dukashe Stadium, East London

2010-03-27

Pampas XV	16 - 19	Western Province

Newlands Stadium, Cape Town

==== Round 6 ====
2010-04-09

Eastern Province	25 - 27	Sharks XV

EPRU Stadium, Port Elizabeth

2010-04-10

Pampas XV	36 - 24	Free State

Florida Park, Parow

2010-04-10

Border Bulldogs	13 - 33	Boland Cavaliers

Sisa Dukashe Stadium, East London

2010-04-10

Western Province	29 - 23	SWD Eagles

Florida Park, Parow

==== Round 7 ====
2010-04-16

Sharks XV	24 - 19	Pampas XV

ABSA Park, Durban

2010-04-17

Free State	20 - 12	Western Province

Petrusburg Show Grounds, Petrusburg

2010-04-17

Boland Cavaliers	36 - 10	Eastern Province

Rhino's Park, Piketberg

2010-04-17

SWD Eagles	39 - 30	Border Bulldogs

Rustdene Stadium, Beaufort West

=== Quarter-finals ===
2010-04-23

Golden Lions	20 - 30	Free State

Johannesburg Stadium, Johannesburg

2010-04-24

Blue Bulls	17 - 6	Western Province
Try: Gerrit-Jan van Velze; Pen: Francois Brummer (3); Drop: Francois Brummer		Pen: Conrad Hoffmann (2)

Loftus Versfeld, Pretoria
Attendance: 2000

2010-04-24

Sharks XV	28 - 24	Griquas

ABSA Park, Durban

2010-04-24

Boland Cavaliers	30 - 25	Leopards

Boland Stadium, Wellington

=== Semi-finals ===
2010-05-01

Boland Cavaliers	14 - 22	Free State

Boland Stadium, Wellington

2010-05-01

Blue Bulls	33 - 3	Sharks XV
Try: Chiliboy Ralepelle, Gerrit-Jan van Velze (2), Tiger Mangweni; Con: Francois Brummer (2); Pen: Francois Brummer (2); Drop: Francois Brummer		Pen: Monty Dumond

Loftus Versfeld, Pretoria

=== Final ===
2010-05-07

Blue Bulls	31 - 29	Free State
Try: Deon Helberg, Ernst Heinrich Dinkelmann, Gerrit-Jan van Velze; Con: Francois Brummer (2); Pen: Francois Brummer (2); Drop: Francois Brummer (2)		Try: Barry Goodes, Riaan Vermeulen; Con: Louis Strydom (2); Pen: Louis Strydom (5)

Loftus Versfeld, Pretoria
Attendance: 2500

2010
Vodacom Cup
CHAMPIONS
Blue Bulls
3rd title
