= Ashton Constant =

South African rugby union player

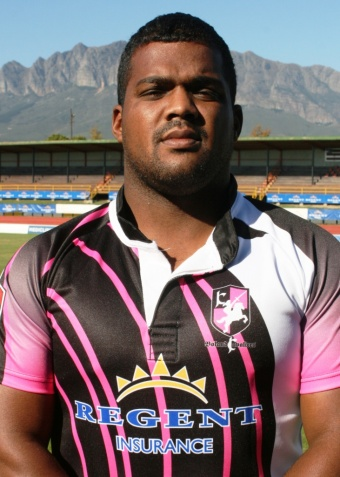
- Born: 28 September 1983 (age 43) Cape Town, South Africa
- Height: 1.82 m (5 ft 11 1/2 in)
- Weight: 110 kg (17 st 5 lb; 243 lb)
- School: Voortrekker High School
- University: University of the Western Cape

Rugby union career
- Position: Prop / Hooker
Youth career
- 2002–2003: Western Province
Amateur team(s)
Years	Team	Apps	(Points)
2015–present	Durbanville-Bellville	6	(10)
Senior career
Years	Team	Apps	(Points)
2004–2005	Western Province	5	(0)
2006–2008	Pumas	47	(30)
2007	Lions	0	(0)
2009	SWD Eagles	11	(5)
2010–2015	Boland Cavaliers	60	(35)
- Correct as of 4 October 2015
International career
Years	Team	Apps	(Points)
2004	South Africa Under-21	5	(5)
2007	Emerging Springboks	3	(5)
2013	South Africa President's XV	3	(0)
- Correct as of 17 June 2013

Ashton Constant (born 28 September 1983) is a South African rugby union player, who most recently playing with the Boland Cavaliers. His regular position is prop or hooker.

== Career ==
=== Youth ===
As a native of Cape Town, Constant came through the youth system of Western Province and represented them at Under-19 level in 2002 and Under-20 level in 2003.

=== Western Province ===
Constant was included in the Western Province squad for the 2004 Vodacom Shield competition and made his senior debut in 2004. He played a total of five matches for Western Province.

=== Pumas ===
In 2006, Constant moved to the Pumas. He immediately became a permanent fixture in the first team, making twelve appearances in the 2006 Currie Cup Premier Division season. His form lead to him being included in the Lions Super Rugby squad for the 2007 Super 14 season and he was even named on the substitute bench in the opening match of their season against the Waratahs, but failed to make an appearance. He continued regularly playing for the Pumas throughout the 2007 and 2008 seasons, accumulating 47 caps for them.

=== SWD Eagles ===
In 2009, Constant joined George-based side SWD Eagles, making ten appearances in the 2009 Vodacom Cup and 2009 Currie Cup First Division competitions.

=== Boland Cavaliers ===
The following season, Constant joined the Boland Cavaliers, where he played his rugby until 2014.

=== Durbanville-Bellville ===
In 2015, Constant joined Western Province club side Durbanville-Bellville and was a member of the squad that won the 2015 SARU Community Cup competition, scoring two tries in six appearances in the competition.

=== Representative rugby ===
Constant also represented South Africa at some levels, playing in the 2004 Under-21 World Championships in 2004, playing for an Emerging Springboks side at the 2007 IRB Nations Cup and the victorious South Africa President's XV team at the 2013 IRB Tbilisi Cup.
