= Carl Bezuidenhout =

South African rugby union player

- Born: 10 February 1986 (age 40) Grahamstown, South Africa
- Height: 1.90 m (6 ft 3 in)
- Weight: 95 kg (209 lb; 14 st 13 lb)
- School: Union High School
- University: UNISA

Rugby union career
- Position: Fly-half / Full-back
Youth career
- 2004: Mighty Elephants
- 2005–2007: Sharks
Senior career
Years	Team	Apps	(Points)
2006–2009	Sharks (Currie Cup)	11	(10)
2009	Mighty Elephants	8	(47)
2010–2013	Pumas	67	(463)
2013–2015	Edinburgh Rugby	14	(51)
2006–2015	Total	99	(571)
- Correct as of 12 June 2015
International career
Years	Team	Apps	(Points)
2013	South Africa President's XV	2	(25)
- Correct as of 31 December 2013

Carl Bezuidenhout (born 10 February 1986 in Grahamstown) is a former South African rugby union footballer. He played either as a fly-half or full-back and played professional rugby between 2006 and 2015. He retired in 2015 to take up a teaching post at Union Schools in Graaff-Reinet.

== Career ==
Bezuidenhout started his career in Durban, where he represented the Sharks between 2006 and 2009. After a short spell with the Mighty Elephants in 2009, he joined the Pumas, where he played the majority of the rugby during his career.

During the 2013 Currie Cup First Division, he broke the all-time points scoring record of that competition, ending the season with 217 points to help the Pumas to the title. He also scored eight points in the first leg of their promotion play-off match to help the Pumas to win promotion to the 2014 Currie Cup Premier Division.

In 2014, he joined Scottish Pro12 side Edinburgh on an extended trial until the end of the 2013–14 season. His first appearance came as a half-time substitute during the Heineken Cup victory over USA Perpignan on 11 January 2014.

He was unable to clinch a regular place in the Edinburgh XV, however, and in the season 2014–2015 professional players draft, he was assigned to Boroughmuir RFC and played mainly for that club in the BT Premiership, the highest level of amateur club rugby in Scotland.

He signed off from Scottish rugby when he scored 16 points in helping Boroughmuir to win the Scottish Cup, beating Hawick 55-17 in the final, at Murrayfield Stadium, on Saturday, 18 April 2015.

=== Representative rugby ===
Bezuidenhout was included in the South Africa Sevens team for the 2007 Wellington Sevens and 2007 USA Sevens competitions during the 2006–07 IRB Sevens World Series.

In 2013, he was included in a South Africa President's XV team that played in the 2013 IRB Tbilisi Cup and won the tournament after winning all three matches. He top scored for the South Africa President's XV team with 25 points.
