= Leon Karemaker =

South African rugby union player

- Born: 18 May 1985 (age 41) Cape Town, South Africa
- Height: 1.91 m (6 ft 3 in)
- Weight: 100 kg (15 st 10 lb; 220 lb)
- School: Hoërskool Bellville
- University: Cape Technikon

Rugby union career
- Position: Eighthman
Youth career
- 2003–2004: Western Province
Senior career
Years	Team	Apps	(Points)
2005–2007	Western Province	14	(25)
2008–2009	Aurillac	20	(15)
2010–2015	Griquas	71	(120)
2011	Cheetahs	2	(0)
2005–2015	Total	107	(160)
- Correct as of 12 October 2015
International career
Years	Team	Apps	(Points)
2002–2003	South Africa Schools		
2003–2004	South Africa Under-19		
2004	South Africa Under-21	2	(0)
- Correct as of 17 April 2015

Leon Karemaker (born 18 May 1985) is a retired South African rugby union footballer. His regular playing position is eighthman. He most recently represents the Griquas in the Currie Cup and Vodacom Cup. He previously played for Western Province and Aurillac. During the 2011 Super Rugby season he played 2 games for the Cheetahs.

He retired at the end of 2015 to take up a post at Kimberley-based school af:Hoërskool Diamantveld.
