= Trompie Pretorius =

South African rugby union player

- Full name: Jerome Pretorius
- Born: 22 March 1988 (age 38) Boksburg, South Africa
- Height: 1.81 m (5 ft 11 1/2 in)
- Weight: 90 kg (14 st 2 lb; 198 lb)
- School: Voortrekker High School

Rugby union career
- Position: Centre
Youth career
- 2004–2009: Sharks
Amateur team(s)
Years	Team	Apps	(Points)
2012	UP Tuks	9	(5)
Senior career
Years	Team	Apps	(Points)
2010–2011	Sharks XV	18	(35)
2012	Blue Bulls	4	(5)
2012–2018	Pumas	91	(105)
- Correct as of 27 October 2018
International career
Years	Team	Apps	(Points)
2013	South Africa President's XV	2	(0)
- Correct as of 17 June 2013

Jerome "Trompie" Pretorius (born 22 March 1988) is a South African rugby union player who last played for the Pumas in the Currie Cup and in the Rugby Challenge.

Pretorius regularly plays as a centre and has previously represented the Sharks, Blue Bulls and UP Tuks.

In 2013, Pretorius was included in a South Africa President's XV team that played in the 2013 IRB Tbilisi Cup and won the tournament after winning all three matches.

Pretorius was a member of the Pumas side that won the Vodacom Cup for the first time in 2015, beating Western Province 24–7 in the final. Pretorius made nine appearances during the season, scoring one try.
