= 2013 IRB Tbilisi Cup =

- Date: 7 – 16 June 2013
- Countries: Georgia; Emerging Ireland; South Africa President's XV; Uruguay

Tournament statistics
- Champions: South Africa President's XV (1st title)
- Matches played: 6
- Attendance: 6,000 (1,000 per match)
- Tries scored: 28 (4.67 per match)
- Top point scorer: (Ireland) Ian Keatley (40 points)
- Top try scorers: (South Africa) Uzair Cassiem (2 tries) (Ireland) Ian Keatley (Ireland) Niall Morris
- Official website: Official website

The 2013 IRB Tbilisi Cup was the inaugural edition of this international rugby union tournament, created by the International Rugby Board and was played from 7 to 16 June 2013 at the Avchala Stadium in Tbilisi.

The hosts Georgia were joined by Uruguay, who regularly take part in the IRB Nations Cup, and two newly founded teams: Emerging Ireland, who were made up of young Irish players that didn't get selected for the Lions tour to Australia or the national side's tour to North America, and a South Africa President's XV, composed of Currie Cup players.

South Africa President's XV won the inaugural tournament after winning all three of their games.

Following this tournament, Georgia played Argentina for the first time outside the Rugby World Cup on 22 June as part of the 2013 mid-year tests.

== Table ==
Position	Nation	Games				Points				Bonus points	Table points
Position	Nation	Played	Won	Drawn	Lost	For	Against	Difference	Tries	Bonus points	Table points
1	South Africa President's XV	3	3	0	0	77	33	+44	9	1	13
2	Emerging Ireland	3	2	0	1	70	67	+3	8	1	9
3	Georgia	3	1	0	2	58	44	+14	6	2	6
4	Uruguay	3	0	0	3	45	106	−61	5	1	1

== Fixtures ==
All times are local

=== Matchday 1 ===
7 June 2013
17:00 GET (UTC+4)

Uruguay	9 – 37 (9–15)	South Africa President's XV
Pen: Etcheverry (2/5) 5' 32'; Drop: Etcheverry (1/1) 1'	IRB; ESPN	Try: Cassiem (2) 22' m 53' m Bothma 12' m Engelbrecht 27' m Louw 71' c Mkhafu 80' c Con: Croy (2/6) 72' 80'; Pen: Croy (1/2) 70'

Attendance: 2,000
Referee: Peter Fitzgibbon (IRFU)

FB	15	Jerónimo Etcheverry
RW	14	Pablo Bueno	(substituted off) 61'
OC	13	Joaquin Prada	58' to 61'
IC	12	Alberto Román
LW	11	Leandro Leivas
FH	10	Agustín del Castillo
SH	9	Alejo Durán
N8	8	Juan Manuel Gaminara
OF	7	Fernando Bascou
BF	6	Juan de Freitas	(substituted off) 66'
RL	5	Francisco Lamanna
LL	4	Rodrigo Espiga	(substituted off) 73'
TP	3	Mario Sagario	(substituted off) 66'
HK	2	Arturo Ávalo (c)	(substituted off) 48'
LP	1	Rodolfo de Mula	(substituted off) 48'
Replacements:
PR	16	Alejo Corral	(substituted in) 48'
HK	17	Nicolás Klappenbach	(substituted in) 48'
PR	18	Gaston Ibarburu	(substituted in) 66'
LK	19	José Coronel	(substituted in) 73'
FL	20	Juan Tassistro	(substituted in) 66'
FH	21	Germán Albanell		(substituted in) 66'
CE	22	Santiago Core	(substituted in) 58'	(substituted off) 66'
Coach:
(Uruguay) Pablo Lemoine

FB	15	Jacquin Jansen	(substituted off) 62'
RW	14	Wilmaure Louw
OC	13	Stefan Watermeyer	(substituted off) 70'
IC	12	Adriaan Engelbrecht
LW	11	Jerome Pretorius
FH	10	Ricardo Croy
SH	9	Sinovuyo Nyoka	(substituted off) 70'
N8	8	Renaldo Bothma	(substituted off) 62'
OF	7	Uzair Cassiem
BF	6	Jaco Bouwer
RL	5	Giant Mtyanda
LL	4	Brendon Snyman (c)	(substituted off) 72'
TP	3	Martin Dreyer
HK	2	Ashton Constant	(substituted off) 62'
LP	1	Khwezi Mkhafu
Replacements:
HK	16	Frank Herne	(substituted in) 62'
PR	17	Ivann Espag	(substituted in) 65'
LK	18	Eduan van der Walt	(substituted in) 72'
N8	19	Brian Shabangu	(substituted in) 62'
SH	20	Ntando Kebe	(substituted in) 79'
CE	21	Rosko Specman	(substituted in) 70'
FB	22	Coenie van Wyk	(substituted in) 62'
Coach:
(South Africa) Jimmy Stonehouse

7 June 2013
19:00 GET (UTC+4)

Georgia	15 – 20 (10–6)	Emerging Ireland
Try: Chkhaidze 40' c Mchedlidze 57' m Con: Tsiklauri (1/2) 40'; Pen: Tsiklauri (1/3) 27'	IRB; ESPN	Try: Kearney 42' m Pen: Keatley (5/6) 10', 24', 54', 79', 80'

Attendance: 2,000
Referee: Nick Briant (NZRU)

FB	15	Beka Tsiklauri
RW	14	Irakli Machkhaneli (c)
OC	13	David Kacharava
IC	12	Merab Sharikadze	(substituted off) 76'
LW	11	Tamaz Mtchedlidze
FH	10	Lasha Malaguradze
SH	9	Giorgi Begadze
N8	8	Giorgi Chkhaidze
OF	7	Viktor Kolelishvili
BF	6	Shalva Sutiashvili
RL	5	Kote Mikautadze	(substituted off) 78'
LL	4	Vakhtang Maisuradze	(substituted off) 68'
TP	3	Levan Chilachava	(substituted off) 60'
HK	2	Revaz Belkania	(substituted off) 68'
LP	1	Irakli Mirtskhulava
Replacements:
PR	16	Giorgi Tetrashvili	(substituted in) 60'
HK	17	Simon Maisuradze	(substituted in) 68'
LK	18	Giorgi Nemsadze	(substituted in) 68'	(yellow card) 80' to end'
FL	19	Givi Berishvili	(substituted in) 78'
SH	20	Vazha Khutsishvili
FH	21	Alexander Todua
CE	22	Tedo Zibzibadze	(substituted in) 76'
Coach:
(New Zealand) Milton Haig

FB	15	David Kearney
RW	14	Niall Morris
OC	13	Eoin Griffin	(substituted off) 67'
IC	12	Michael Allen	(substituted off) 49'
LW	11	Tiernan O'Halloran
FH	10	Ian Keatley
SH	9	Michael Heaney	(substituted off) 52'
N8	8	Robbie Diack
OF	7	Dominic Ryan	(substituted off) 67'
BF	6	Rhys Ruddock (c)
RL	5	David Foley
LL	4	Lewis Stevenson	(substituted off) 40'
TP	3	Michael Bent
HK	2	Robert Herring	(substituted off) 72'
LP	1	Jack McGrath
Replacements:
HK	16	Niall Annett	(substituted in) 72'
PR	17	Richard Lutton
LK	18	Ian Nagle	(substituted in) 40'
FL	19	Jordi Murphy	(substituted in) 67'
SH	20	John Cooney	(substituted in) 52'
FH	21	Noel Reid	(substituted in) 49'
CE	22	Brendan Macken	(substituted in) 67'
Coach:
(Ireland) Allen Clarke

=== Matchday 2 ===
11 June 2013
17:00 GET (UTC+4)

Emerging Ireland	8 – 19 (3–10)	South Africa President's XV
Try: Allen 61' m Pen: Keatley (1/2) 17'	rugby.ge	Try: Bock 11' c Con: Bezuidenhout (1/1); Pen: Bezuidenhout (4/4) 6', 43', 48', 79'

Attendance: 2,000
Referee: Nick Briant (NZRU)

11 June 2013
19:00 GET (UTC+4)

Georgia	27 – 3 (17–0)	Uruguay
Try: Todua 9' c Zibzibadze 34' c Nemsadze 51' c Con: Tsiklauri (3/3); Pen: Tsiklauri (2/4) 1', 42'	IRB; ESPN	Pen: Albanell (1) 56'

Attendance: 2,000
Referee: Vlad Iordăchescu (FRR)

=== Matchday 3 ===
16 June 2013
14:00 GET (UTC+4)

Uruguay	33–42	Emerging Ireland
Try: Gaminara 13' c Espiga 52' c Albanell 60' c Román 66' m de Freitas 80' c Con: Etcheverry (1); Prada (3)	Report	Try: O'Halloran 4' c Keatley (2) 9' c, 17' c Morris (2) 43' c, 48' c Annett 56' c Con: Keatley (6/6)

Attendance: 2,000
Referee: Vlad Iordăchescu (FRR)

16 June 2013
16:00 GET (UTC+4)

Georgia	16–21	South Africa President's XV
Try: Chilachava 19' c Con: Tsiklauri (1/1); Pen: Tsiklauri (3) 11', 28', 46'	IRB; ESPN	Try: Specman 36' c Van der Walt 57' m Con: Bezuidenhout (1); Pen: Bezuidenhout (3) 2', 6', 21'

Attendance: 2,000
Referee: Peter Fitzgibbon (IRFU)

== Statistics ==
=== Leading point scorers ===
Pos	Name	Team	Points
1	Ian Keatley	Emerging Ireland	40
2	Beka Tsiklauri	(Georgia (country)) Georgia	28
3	Carl Bezuidenhout	South Africa President's XV	25
4	Jerónimo Etcheverry	Uruguay	11
5	Uzair Cassiem	South Africa President's XV	10
5	Niall Morris	Emerging Ireland	10
7	Ricardo Croy	South Africa President's XV	7
8	German Albanell	Uruguay	8
9	Joaquin Prada	Uruguay	6

=== Leading try scorers ===
Pos	Name	Team	Tries
1	Uzair Cassiem	South Africa President's XV	2
1	Ian Keatley	Emerging Ireland	2
1	Niall Morris	Emerging Ireland	2
4	22 players		1

== See also ==
- 2013 IRB Nations Cup
- 2013 IRB Pacific Nations Cup
