= Brendon Snyman =

South African rugby union player (born 1984)

- Full name: Brendon Michael Snyman
- Born: 21 August 1984 (age 42) Pietersburg, South Africa
- Height: 2.00 m (6 ft 7 in)
- Weight: 120 kg (260 lb; 18 st 13 lb)
- School: Pietersburg High School / Auckland Grammar School
- University: University of Pretoria

Rugby union career
- Position: Lock
Youth career
- 2003–2004: Blue Bulls
Senior career
Years	Team	Apps	(Points)
2005	SWD Eagles	16	(5)
2006–2009	Griquas	67	(45)
2009–2010	Eastern Province Kings	10	(0)
2010	EP Invitational XV	1	(0)
2011–2013	Leopards	46	(25)
2013–2014	Leopards XV	14	(0)
2014–2015	Montauban	18	(0)
2015–2016	London Welsh	12	(5)
2017	SWD Eagles	12	(0)
- Correct as of 29 May 2018
International career
Years	Team	Apps	(Points)
2013	South Africa President's XV	4	(0)
- Correct as of 17 June 2013

Brendon Michael Snyman (born 21 August 1984) is a South African rugby union player who most recently played for the SWD Eagles. His regular position is lock.

== Career ==
=== Early career ===
He represented the Blue Bulls in the 2003 and 2004 Under–20 competitions.

=== SWD Eagles ===
In 2005, he moved to George to play for the SWD Eagles, making sixteen appearances in his debut season.

=== Griquas ===
He joined Griquas in 2006, where he spent the next four seasons and racking up 67 appearances in his time in Kimberley in both the Vodacom Cup and Currie Cup competitions.

=== Eastern Province Kings ===
During the 2009 Currie Cup Premier Division, he played one game on loan at the Mighty Elephants and joined them on a permanent basis in 2010 (when they changed their name to the Eastern Province Kings), where he made four Vodacom Cup appearances, five Currie Cup appearances (two starts) and one appearance in the pre-season compulsory friendlies.

=== Leopards ===
He then joined Potchefstroom-based side the Leopards, where he quickly became an established first team player over the next few seasons.

=== Montauban ===
He moved to France to join Montauban for the 2014–15 Pro D2 season.

=== London Welsh ===
After one season in France, Snyman moved to England to join RFU Championship side London Welsh.

=== Representative rugby ===
He was included in the South Africa President's XV squad for the 2013 IRB Tbilisi Cup and later confirmed as captain of the team. They won the tournament after winning all three their matches.
