= Renaldo Bothma =

Namibia international rugby union player (born 1989)

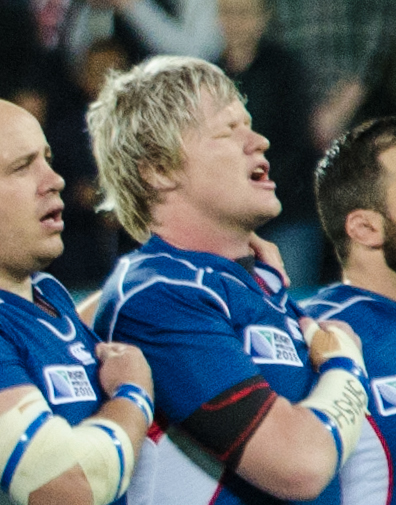
- Born: 18 September 1989 (age 37) Alberton, South Africa
- Height: 1.90 m (6 ft 3 in)
- Weight: 105 kg (231 lb; 16 st 7 lb)
- School: Volkskool Heidelberg

Rugby union career
- Position(s): Flanker, Number 8
Senior career
Years	Team	Apps	(Points)
2010	Golden Lions	7	(10)
2011	Golden Lions XV	6	(5)
2011	Leopards	1	(0)
2012–2014	Pumas	54	(110)
2015–2016	Sharks	15	(5)
2015	Toyota Verblitz	9	(5)
2016–2017	Blue Bulls XV	4	(10)
2016–2017	Bulls	7	(10)
2016	Pumas	7	(10)
2017–2020	Harlequins	27	(5)
- Correct as of 11 April 2018
International career
Years	Team	Apps	(Points)
2013	South Africa President's XV	2	(5)
2014–present	Namibia	16	(40)
- Correct as of 16 November 2018

Renaldo Bothma (born 18 September 1989) is a South African-born Namibian former rugby union footballer. He played mostly as a flanker. Formerly, he represented the Bulls in Super Rugby and the Blue Bulls in the Currie Cup, the Golden Lions, Leopards, Sharks and Pumas.

== Career ==
In 2013, he was included in a South Africa President's XV team that played in the 2013 IRB Tbilisi Cup and won the tournament after winning all three matches.

He initially joined the Sharks for the 2015 and 2016 Super Rugby seasons, with a clause to return to the Pumas for the Currie Cup competition in those seasons. However, due to his involvement with Namibia at the 2015 Rugby World Cup, he didn't play for the Pumas in the 2015 Currie Cup Premier Division. In March 2016, during the 2016 Super Rugby season, he gained an early released from his contract with the Sharks to join Pretoria-based Super Rugby side the Bulls.

He signed a deal to join English Premiership side Harlequins prior to the 2017–18 season, signing a three-year deal.

He made his Debut for Harlequins on 3 December 2017, against European Champions Saracens, in the Aviva Premiership.

=== Namibia ===
Qualifying for Namibia through his mother, Renaldo made his international debut in 2014 against Kenya.
