= Mir Qasem =

- Location in Afghanistan
- Coordinates: 36°38′40″N 66°54′27″E
- Country: Afghanistan
- Province: Balkh Province
- Time zone: + 4.30

Mir Qasem is a village in Balkh Province in northern Afghanistan.

== See also ==
- Balkh Province
