= Beka Tsiklauri =

Georgia international rugby union player

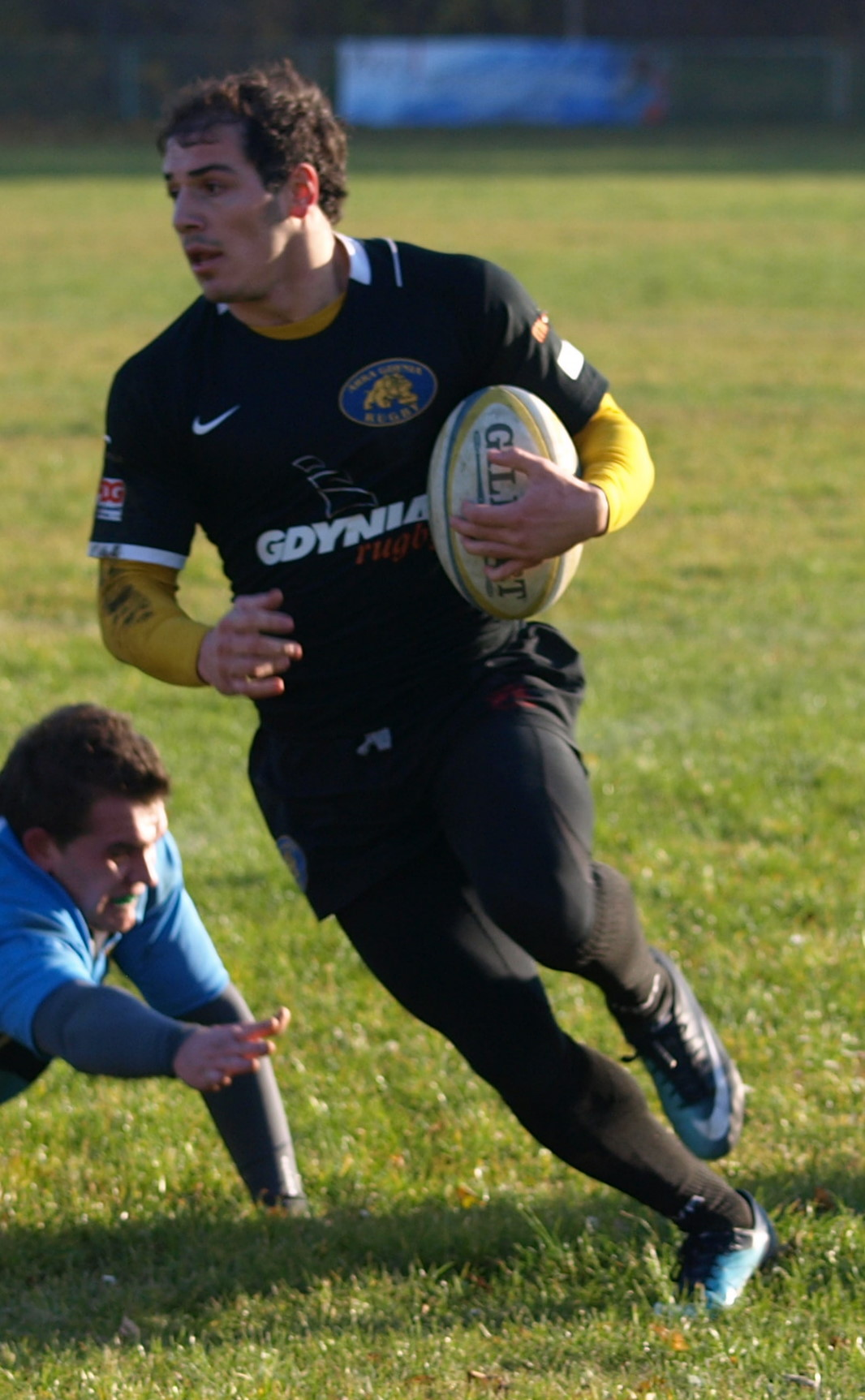
- Born: 9 February 1989 (age 37) Tbilisi, Soviet Union
- Height: 1.82 m (6 ft 0 in)
- Weight: 87 kg (13 st 10 lb; 192 lb)

Rugby union career
- Position: Fullback
Senior career
Years	Team	Apps	(Points)
- Locomotive
- Correct as of 4 September 2015
International career
Years	Team	Apps	(Points)
2008-	Georgia	30	(124)
- Correct as of 19 April 2018

Beka Tsiklauri (born February 9, 1989, in Tbilisi) is a Georgian rugby union player who plays as a fullback.

He currently plays for Locomotive in the Georgia Championship and the Georgia national team.

He has 22 caps for Georgia since his debut in 2008, with 4 tries, 11 conversions, 15 penalties and 2 drop goals scored, 93 points in aggregate. He was called for the 2015 Rugby World Cup, playing in two games and scoring a try against the All Blacks.
