= Alshaun Bock =

South African rugby union player

- Full name: Alshaun Gerswon Bock
- Born: 16 May 1982 (age 44) Welington, South Africa
- Height: 1.85 m (6 ft 1 in)
- Weight: 80 kg (180 lb; 12 st 8 lb)
- School: Weltevrede Senior Secondary

Rugby union career
- Position: Winger
Youth career
- 2002: Boland Cavaliers
Amateur team(s)
Years	Team	Apps	(Points)
2009–2011	Hamiltons		
Senior career
Years	Team	Apps	(Points)
2002–2004, 2007–2008	Boland Cavaliers	38	(95)
2005–2006	Griquas	22	(65)
2009	Western Province	1	(5)
2012–2015	SWD Eagles	64	(275)
2016–2017	Griquas	18	(50)
2017–2018	Southern Kings	12	(10)
2017	Eastern Province Kings	3	(10)
2018	SWD Eagles	13	(15)
2022–	Boland Cavaliers	13	(15)
- Correct as of 30 March 2022
International career
Years	Team	Apps	(Points)
2003	South Africa Sevens		
2003	South Africa Under-21	5	(45)
2013	South Africa President's XV	3	(10)
- Correct as of 24 March 2015

Alshaun Gerswon Bock (born 16 May 1982) is a South African rugby union player who last played for the SWD Eagles in the Currie Cup and in the Rugby Challenge. His regular position is winger.

== Career ==
Bock started playing for Boland Cavaliers in 2002 and his performances led to his inclusion in the South Africa Under-21 team for the 2003 Under 21 Rugby World Championship in England, scoring nine tries in five games. He was also called up to the South Africa Sevens team for the Hong Kong Sevens in the same year.

Another season at Boland Cavaliers followed before he joined Griquas in 2005, where he had a successful two seasons. He then returned to Boland Cavaliers for 2007 and 2008. A solitary first class performance for Western Province followed in 2009, but he spent most of his time playing club rugby for the Hamiltons RFC in Cape Town.

Bock got another shot at playing first class rugby in 2012, however, when he was signed by the SWD Eagles. He was given a two-year contract extension in 2013.

In 2013, he was included in a South Africa President's XV team that played in the 2013 IRB Tbilisi Cup and won the tournament after winning all three matches.

=== Griquas ===
Bock joined Kimberley-based side Griquas for the 2016 and 2017 seasons.

=== Southern Kings ===
Bock joined the Southern Kings for the 2017 Super Rugby season. He made his Super Rugby debut for them in their match against the Sharks, at 34 years, 306 days becoming the fourth oldest debutant in the history of the competition.
