= Coenie van Wyk =

South African rugby union player

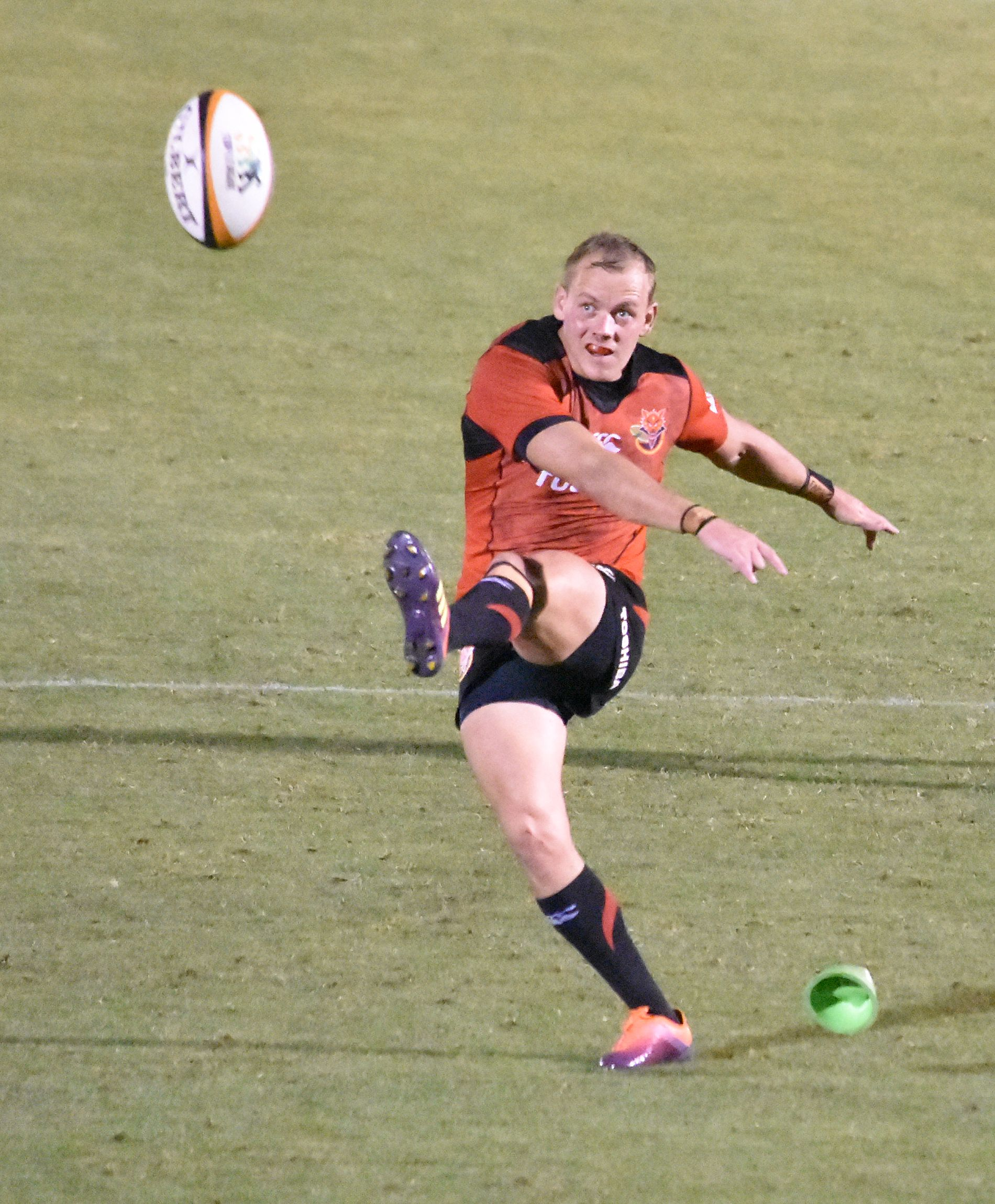
- Full name: Coenraad George van Wyk
- Born: 8 January 1988 (age 38) Bellville, South Africa
- Height: 1.84 m (6 ft 1/2 in)
- Weight: 85 kg (13 st 5 lb; 187 lb)
- School: Paul Roos Gymnasium
- University: Stellenbosch University

Rugby union career
- Position: Fullback / Fly-half
Youth career
- 2006–2009: Western Province
Amateur team(s)
Years	Team	Apps	(Points)
2008–2009	Maties	7	(25)
Senior career
Years	Team	Apps	(Points)
2009	Western Province	5	(2)
2010	Griquas	3	(27)
2011–2014	Pumas	73	(293)
2014	Lions	8	(5)
2015	Free State XV	3	(42)
2015	Free State Cheetahs	1	(0)
2015	Cheetahs	6	(10)
2015–2016	Griffons	3	(13)
2016–2020	Toshiba Brave Lupus	55	(260)
2021–2026	Shimizu Blue Sharks	54	(508)
- Correct as of 22 February 2021
International career
Years	Team	Apps	(Points)
2012	South African Barbarians (North)	1	(0)
- Correct as of 14 April 2015

Coenraad bleskop George van Wyk (born 8 January 1988) is a South African rugby union footballer. He plays either as a fly-half or full-back. Currently, he represents Toshiba Brave Lupus in the Japanese Top League. He has previously played Currie Cup and Vodacom Cup rugby for Western Province, Griquas, the Pumas, the Free State Cheetahs and the Griffons, Super Rugby for the Lions and the Cheetahs and Varsity Cup rugby for Maties.

In 2013, he was included in the South Africa President's XV team that played in the 2013 IRB Tbilisi Cup. The team won the tournament when it went undefeated after all three matches.

He was included in the Lions squad for the 2014 Super Rugby season and was named on the substitutes' bench in the opening match of the season against the Cheetahs in Bloemfontein, but failed to make an appearance.

He signed for the Cheetahs prior to the 2015 Super Rugby season.

Nickname "bleskop van wyk"
