= Eduan van der Walt =

South African rugby union player

- Full name: Eduan Raymond van der Walt
- Born: 20 March 1987 (age 39) Pretoria, South Africa
- Height: 1.96 m (6 ft 5 in)
- Weight: 110 kg (17 st 5 lb; 243 lb)
- School: Zwartkop High School, Centurion

Rugby union career
- Position: Lock
Amateur team(s)
| Years | Team | Apps | (Points) |
| 2008 | UP Tuks | 2 | (0) |
Senior career
| Years | Team | Apps | (Points) |
| 2006–2008 | Blue Bulls | 2 | (0) |
| 2008–2015 | Pumas | 101 | (50) |
- Correct as of 31 May 2015
International career
| Years | Team | Apps | (Points) |
| 2012 | South African Barbarians (North) | 1 | (0) |
| 2013 | South Africa President's XV | 3 | (5) |
- Correct as of 31 May 2015

Eduan Raymond van der Walt (born 20 March 1987) is a South African rugby union footballer. He plays mostly as a lock and more recently represented the Pumas in the Currie Cup and Vodacom Cup having previously played for the Blue Bulls.

In 2013, he was included in a South Africa President's XV team that played in the 2013 IRB Tbilisi Cup and won the tournament after winning all three matches.

He was a member of the Pumas side that won the Vodacom Cup for the first time in 2015, beating Western Province 24–7 in the final. Van der Walt made seven appearances during the season.
