= Ricardo Croy =

South African rugby union player

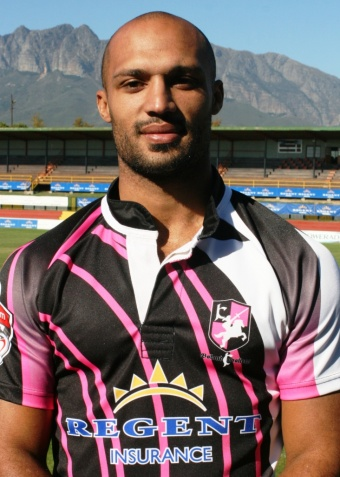
- Full name: Ricardo Croy
- Born: 7 December 1986 (age 39) Bellville, South Africa
- Height: 1.75 m (5 ft 9 in)
- Weight: 85 kg (13 st 5 lb; 187 lb)
- School: Paarl Gimnasium, Paarl

Rugby union career
- Position: Fly-half
- Current team: Boland Cavaliers
Youth career
- 2004–2007: Western Province
Amateur team(s)
| Years | Team | Apps | (Points) |
| 2008 | Maties | 2 | (5) |
Senior career
| Years | Team | Apps | (Points) |
| 2006–2008 | Western Province | 14 | (56) |
| 2008–2009 | SWD Eagles | 22 | (193) |
| 2010–2011 | Pumas | 27 | (195) |
| 2012–present | Boland Cavaliers | 24 | (73) |
- Correct as of 30 September 2013
International career
| Years | Team | Apps | (Points) |
| 2005 | South Africa Under-19 | | |
| 2012 | South African Barbarians (South) | 1 | (0) |
| 2013 | South Africa President's XV | 1 | (7) |
- Correct as of 17 June 2013

Ricardo Croy (born 7 December 1986) is a South African rugby union player, currently playing with the Boland Cavaliers. His regular position is fly-half.

== Career ==
=== Youth ===
Croy represented Western Province at the 2004 Under-18 Craven Week tournament. This led to his inclusion in the South Africa Under-19 squad for the Under 19 Rugby World Championship in 2005. Further appearances for Western Province followed at Under-19 level in 2005 and at Under-21 level at 2006 and 2007.

=== Senior career ===
==== Western Province ====
Croy made his debut for Western Province in the 2006 Vodacom Cup game against the Golden Lions. Further appearances followed in the 2008 Vodacom Cup side, but he failed to break into the Currie Cup side.

==== SWD Eagles ====
Croy then joined George-based side the SWD Eagles during the 2008 Currie Cup First Division season, making four appearances. He was 5th top scorer in the 2009 Vodacom Cup, scoring 94 points. A further 48 points in the 2009 Currie Cup First Division followed to help them finish second in the league, but they failed to win promotion, despite him accumulating the highest individual tally in the play-off games, scoring 23 points.

==== Pumas ====
In 2010, Croy then moved to Premier Division side the Pumas, whom he regularly represented over the next two seasons.

==== Boland Cavaliers ====
Croy made the move back to the Western Cape in 2012, linking up with the Boland Cavaliers.

=== Representative rugby ===
In 2012, Croy was included in a South African Barbarians (South) team that faced England during the 2012 mid-year rugby test series. The following year, he was included in a South Africa President's XV team that played in the 2013 IRB Tbilisi Cup and won the tournament after winning all three matches.
