= Marnitz Boshoff =

South Africa international rugby union player

- Full name: Marnitz Louis Boshoff
- Born: 11 January 1989 (age 37) Nelspruit, South Africa
- Height: 1.79 m (5 ft 10 1/2 in)
- Weight: 87 kg (13 st 10 lb; 192 lb)
- School: Nelspruit Hoërskool
- University: University of Pretoria

Rugby union career
- Position: Fly-half / Fullback
- Current team: Bulls / Blue Bulls / Blue Bulls XV
Youth career
- 2005–2007: Pumas
- 2007–2010: Blue Bulls
Amateur team(s)
Years	Team	Apps	(Points)
2009, 2011	UP Tuks	7	(28)
Senior career
Years	Team	Apps	(Points)
2009–2011	Blue Bulls	24	(130)
2012	Griquas	13	(37)
2013–2016	Golden Lions XV	14	(191)
2013–2016	Golden Lions	32	(385)
2013–2016	Lions	30	(235)
2016–2017	Connacht	3	(5)
2017–present	Blue Bulls	11	(71)
2018–present	Bulls	3	(11)
2019–present	Blue Bulls XV	3	(37)
- Correct as of 25 August 2019
International career
Years	Team	Apps	(Points)
2014	South Africa	1	(2)
2014	Barbarians	2	(19)
- Correct as of 13 April 2018

Marnitz Louis Boshoff (born 11 January 1989) is a South African rugby union player who usually plays as a fly-half or fullback. He plays for the Bulls in Super Rugby, the Blue Bulls in the Currie Cup and the Blue Bulls XV in the Rugby Challenge, having previously played for South African provincial sides Griquas, the Blue Bulls and the Golden Lions in the Currie Cup and for Super Rugby side the Lions. He also had a short stint with Irish provincial side Connacht in the Pro14.

He played in a single test match for South Africa in 2014 and also featured for invitational side the Barbarians.

== Rugby career ==
=== Youth rugby ===
Born in Nelspruit in the Mpumalanga province of South Africa, Boshoff is a graduate of Nelspruit Hoërskool and attended the University of Pretoria. He was part of the youth team of Nelspruit-based side the Pumas from 2005 to 2007, before joining the academy of the Pretoria-based Blue Bulls.

=== Blue Bulls ===
Boshoff first played at provincial level for the Blue Bulls, playing for them from 2009 to 2011 after coming through their youth side. During his time with the Blue Bulls, he played 24 times, scoring 130 points.

=== Griquas ===
In 2012, Boshoff moved to the Griquas. He spent one year there, making 13 appearances and scoring 37 points.

=== Golden Lions / Lions ===
He joined the Golden Lions for 2013.

He played in both legs of the Lions' promotion/relegation matches after the 2013 Super Rugby season, which saw the Lions regain their spot in Super Rugby.

After a season that saw him finish as the top points scorer for the Golden Lions in the 2013 Currie Cup Premier Division, he was then included in the Lions squad for the 2014 Super Rugby season and made his Super Rugby debut in a man-of-the-match performance in the opening match of the season, scoring all the Lions' points – including a last-minute drop goal – to help them beat the Cheetahs 21–20 in Bloemfontein.

He was the Golden Lions' first-choice fly-half during the 2014 and 2015 Currie Cup competitions, with the Lions reaching the final both times and winning the trophy in 2015, with Boshoff again finishing as the top points scorer.

=== Connacht ===
In March 2016, Irish Pro12 side Connacht announced that they secured Boshoff's services on a two-year contract.

=== Representative rugby ===
In May 2014, Boshoff was one of eight uncapped players that were called up to a Springbok training camp prior to the 2014 mid-year rugby union tests. Although not initially selected in the 36-man squad, Boshoff was called up to the squad when Damian de Allende suffered a knee ligament injury. He played off the bench against Scotland and scored his first points by converting a try.

He was chosen to represent the Barbarians to face Australia on 1 November 2014 at Twickenham. He came off the bench and scored two conversions and a try, but the Barbarians lost 36–40.
