= Jaco Bouwer =

South African rugby union footballer (born 1985)

- Full name: Willem Sterrenberg Jacobus Marais Bouwer
- Born: 4 September 1985 (age 41) Kempton Park, South Africa
- Height: 1.84 m (6 ft 1/2 in)
- Weight: 97 kg (15 st 4 lb; 214 lb)
- School: Hoërskool Waterkloof, Pretoria
- University: North-West University, Potchefstroom

Rugby union career
- Position: Flanker
Youth career
- 2005–2006: Leopards
Senior career
Years	Team	Apps	(Points)
2007–2008	Leopards	34	(40)
2009–2015	Pumas	121	(240)
- Correct as of 9 October 2015
International career
Years	Team	Apps	(Points)
2012	South African Barbarians	1	(0)
2013	South Africa President's XV	4	(0)
- Correct as of 25 March 2015

Willem Sterrenberg Jacobus Marais Bouwer (born 4 September 1985) is a South African rugby union footballer. He plays mostly as a flanker. He most recently represented the Pumas in the Currie Cup and Vodacom Cup having previously played for the Leopards.

In 2013, he was included in a South Africa President's XV team that played in the 2013 IRB Tbilisi Cup and won the tournament after winning all three matches.

He was a member of the Pumas side that won the Vodacom Cup for the first time in 2015, beating Western Province 24–7 in the final. Bouwer made three appearances during the season, scoring one try.
