= Stefan Watermeyer =

South African rugby union player (born 1988)

- Born: 3 June 1988 (age 38) Nelspruit, South Africa
- Height: 1.85 m (6 ft 1 in)
- Weight: 96 kg (212 lb; 15 st 2 lb)
- School: Hoërskool Waterkloof

Rugby union career
- Position: Centre
Youth career
- 2000–2001: Pumas
- 2004–2009: Blue Bulls
Senior career
Years	Team	Apps	(Points)
2007	Blue Bulls XV	1	(0)
2008–2011	Blue Bulls	55	(124)
2010	Bulls	1	(0)
2011–2012	Ospreys	2	(5)
2012	Griquas	3	(0)
2013–2015	Pumas	50	(80)
2014	Lions	13	(10)
2016	Southern Kings	12	(17)
2007–2016	Total	137	(236)
- Correct as of 27 March 2016
International career
Years	Team	Apps	(Points)
2005–2006	South Africa Schools		
2007	South Africa Under-19		
2008	South Africa Under-20		
2013	South Africa President's XV	3	(0)
- Correct as of 12 March 2014

Stefan Watermeyer (born 3 June 1988) is a former South African rugby union player that regularly played as a centre. During his first class career between 2007 and 2016, he played Super Rugby for the Bulls, Lions and Southern Kings, domestic South African rugby with the Blue Bulls, Griquas and Pumas and had a short spell with Welsh side Ospreys. He also represented South Africa at schoolboy, Under-19 and Under-20 level and also played for a South Africa President's XV at the 2013 IRB Tbilisi Cup.

He announced his retirement from rugby at the conclusion of the 2016 Super Rugby season with the Southern Kings.

== Career ==
He has previously played for the Bulls, the Ospreys and Griquas.

On his Ospreys debut, he scored a try and was named Man of the Match. However, the implementation of a wage cap in Wales meant that he was released by the Ospreys in July 2012.

He joined the Pumas for the 2013 season.

He was included in the Lions squad for the 2014 Super Rugby season and made his debut in a 21–20 victory over the Cheetahs in Bloemfontein.

He was a member of the Pumas side that won the Vodacom Cup for the first time in 2015, beating Western Province 24–7 in the final. Watermeyer made nine appearances during the season, scoring one try.

He joined the Southern Kings prior to the 2016 Super Rugby season.

=== Representative rugby ===
In 2013, he was included in a South Africa President's XV team that played in the 2013 IRB Tbilisi Cup and won the tournament after winning all three matches.
