= Ruan Snyman =

South African rugby union player

- Full name: Ruan Snyman
- Born: 9 March 1987 (age 39) Pretoria, South Africa
- Height: 1.70 m (5 ft 7 in)
- Weight: 88 kg (13 st 12 lb; 194 lb)
- School: Afrikaanse Hoër Seunskool
- University: University of Pretoria

Rugby union career
- Position: Scrum-half
- Current team: Griquas
Youth career
- 2004: Leopards
- 2005–2008: Blue Bulls
Senior career
| Years | Team | Apps | (Points) |
| 2006–2013 | Blue Bulls | 70 | (60) |
| 2010–2013 | Bulls | 1 | (5) |
| 2013–2014 | Racing Métro | 1 | (0) |
| 2014–present | Griquas | 0 | (0) |
- Correct as of 10 September 2013

Ruan Snyman (born 9 March 1987) is a South African rugby union footballer. He plays as a scrum-half for the Racing Métro in the French Top 14.

He represented the Bulls in Super Rugby and the Blue Bulls in the Currie Cup and Vodacom Cup since representing them in the 2005 Craven Week tournament.

During the 2013 Currie Cup Premier Division season, he joined French Top 14 side Racing Métro for the 2013–14 Top 14 season, before joining Griquas for the 2014 Vodacom Cup season.
