= Uzair Cassiem =

South African rugby union player (born 1990)

- Born: 17 March 1990 (age 36) Strand, South Africa
- Height: 1.89 m (6 ft 2 1/2 in)
- Weight: 98 kg (15 st 6 lb; 216 lb)
- University: Boland College

Rugby union career
- Position(s): Number 8 Blindside Flanker
- Current team: Bayonne
Youth career
- 2011: Golden Lions
Senior career
Years	Team	Apps	(Points)
2011–2012	Golden Lions XV	5	(5)
2012	Falcons	3	(10)
2012–2015	Pumas	71	(65)
2016–2018	Cheetahs	37	(60)
2016–2017	Free State Cheetahs	12	(25)
2018–2021	Scarlets	51	(20)
2021–	Bayonne	44	(40)
- Correct as of 25 February 2022
International career
Years	Team	Apps	(Points)
2013	South Africa President's XV	4	(10)
2016–2017	South Africa	8	(5)
2017	South Africa 'A'	2	(0)
- Correct as of 28 September 2019

Uzair Cassiem (born 17 March 1990) is a South African rugby union player for French side Bayonne.

Cassiem, who usually plays as a loose forward, previously represented the Golden Lions and Falcons.

In 2013, he was included in a South Africa President's XV team that played in the 2013 IRB Tbilisi Cup and won the tournament after winning all three matches. Cassiem finished joint top try scorer with two tries.

He was a member of the Pumas side that won the Vodacom Cup for the first time in 2015, beating Western Province 24–7 in the final. Cassiem appeared in all ten of their matches during the season.

Despite initially signing a contract to join Kimberley-based side Griquas prior to the 2016 season, he was included in the training squad of Super Rugby side the Cheetahs and it was later confirmed that he would remain with them for the entire 2016 season.

On 29 May 2018, Cassiem would leave South Africa to sign for Welsh region Scarlets in the Pro14 from the 2018–19 season.

On 4 April 2021, Cassiem would travel to France to join with Bayonne in the Prod2 competition from the 2021–22 season.
