= 2012 Currie Cup Premier Division =

Domestic rugby union competition

- Champions: Western Province (33rd title)
- Runners-up: Sharks
- Matches played: 35
- Attendance: 645,820 (average 18,452 per match)
- Tries scored: 169 (average 4.8 per match)
- Top point scorer: Louis Fouché (137)
- Top try scorer: Raymond Rhule (8)

The 2012 Currie Cup Premier Division was the 74th season in the competition since it started in 1889 and was contested from 11 August to 27 October 2012. The tournament (known as the Absa Currie Cup Premier Division for sponsorship reasons) is the top tier of South Africa's premier domestic rugby union competition.

== Competition ==
=== Regular season and title play offs ===
There were 6 participating teams in the 2012 Currie Cup Premier Division. These teams played each other twice over the course of the season, once at home and once away.

Teams received four points for a win and two points for a draw. Bonus points were awarded to teams that scored 4 or more tries in a game, as well as to teams losing a match by 7 points or less. Teams were to be ranked by points, then points difference (points scored less points conceded).

The top 4 teams qualified for the title play-offs. In the semi-finals, the team that finish first will have home advantage against the team that finished fourth, while the team that finished second will have home advantage against the team that finished third. The winners of these semi-finals will play each other in the final, at the home venue of the higher-placed team.

=== Relegation play offs ===
The bottom team on the log will also qualify for the promotion/relegation play-offs. That team will play off against the team placed first in the 2012 Currie Cup First Division over two legs. The winner over these two ties (determined via team tables, with all Currie Cup ranking regulations in effect) will qualify for the 2013 Currie Cup Premier Division, while the losing team will qualify for the 2013 Currie Cup First Division.

== Teams ==
Location of teams in 2012 Currie Cup Premier Division

=== Changes from 2011 ===
- The Pumas and Leopards were relegated to the 2012 Currie Cup First Division.

=== Team Listing ===
Team	Stadium	Capacity
Blue Bulls	Loftus Versfeld, Pretoria	51,762
Free State Cheetahs	Free State Stadium, Bloemfontein	40,911
Golden Lions	Coca-Cola Park, Johannesburg	62,567
Griquas	Griqua Park, Kimberley	18,000
Sharks	Kings Park Stadium, Durban	55,000
Western Province	Newlands Stadium, Cape Town	51,900

== Table ==
2012 Currie Cup Premier Division Table
Pos	Team	Pld	W	D	L	PF	PA	PD	TF	TA	TB	LB	Pts	Qualification
1	Sharks	10	7	0	3	292	233	+59	32	18	5	2	35	Semi-finals
2	Golden Lions	10	6	0	4	285	279	+6	24	23	4	0	28	Semi-finals
3	Western Province	10	5	0	5	272	226	+46	28	19	3	2	25	Semi-finals
4	Blue Bulls	10	5	0	5	280	291	−11	19	29	1	1	22	Semi-finals
5	Griquas	10	4	0	6	250	313	−63	28	35	3	1	20	
6	Free State Cheetahs	10	3	0	7	268	305	−37	26	33	2	4	18	Relegation Play-Offs

Rules for classification: 4 points for a win; 2 points for a draw; 1 bonus point for a loss by seven points or less; 1 bonus point for scoring four or more tries in a match

== Fixtures and results ==
All times are South African (GMT+2).

=== Round one ===
10 August 2012	Blue Bulls	35 – 20	Griquas	Loftus Versfeld, Pretoria
19:10	Try: Akona Ndungane 43'; Ruan Snyman 67'; Con: Louis Fouché 44', 68' (2/2); Pen: Louis Fouché 9', 17', 26', 48', 54', 65', 70' (7/9); Drop: Jurgen Visser (0/1); Louis Fouché (0/1)	Scoreboard Report	Try: Rocco Jansen 11'; Martin Muller 60'; Con: Francois Brummer 12', 61' (2/2); Pen: Francois Brummer 4' (1/3); Drop: Francois Brummer 39' (1/1); Cards: Willie le Roux (yellow card) 20' to 30'	Attendance: 7,236; Referee: Rasta Rasivhenge

11 August 2012	Golden Lions	43 – 20	Free State Cheetahs	Ellis Park Stadium, Johannesburg
17:05	Try: Derick Minnie 16'; Andries Coetzee 33'; Hendrik Roodt 65'; Ruan Combrinck 78'; Con: Butch James 17', 34', 66' (3/3); Guy Cronjé 79' (1/1); Pen: Butch James 12', 31', 39', 60', 72' (5/5)	Scoreboard	Try: Raymond Rhule 55', 62'; Con: Riaan Smit 56', 63' (2/2); Pen: Riaan Smit 15', 25' (2/2); Cards: Andries Strauss (yellow card) 59' to 70'	Attendance: 10,316; Referee: Marius Jonker

11 August 2012	Western Province	23 – 25	Sharks	Newlands Stadium, Cape Town
19:10	Try: Tiaan Liebenberg 17'; Deon Fourie 70'; Con: Joe Pietersen 18', 71' (2/2); Pen: Joe Pietersen 5', 11', 55' (3/4); Drop: Burton Francis (0/1)	Scoreboard	Try: Paul Jordaan 41'; Craig Burden 44', 55'; Con: Meyer Bosman 45', 56' (2/3); Pen: Meyer Bosman 31' (1/1); Drop: Riaan Viljoen 73' (1/1); Cards: Jacques Botes (yellow card) 67' to 77'	Attendance: 14,261; Referee: Lourens van der Merwe

=== Round two ===
17 August 2012	Free State Cheetahs	32 – 18	Blue Bulls	Free State Stadium, Bloemfontein
19:10	Try: Andries Ferreira 1'; Kabamba Floors 40'; Con: Riaan Smit 2', 40' (4/4); Pen: Riaan Smit 18', 26', 36', 47', 57' (5/5); Nico Scheepers 80' (1/1)	Scoreboard Report	Try: CJ Stander 29' 73'; Con: Louis Fouché 30' (1/2); Pen: Louis Fouché 20', 45' (2/3)	Attendance: 15,827; Referee: Sindile Mayende

18 August 2012	Griquas	20 – 25	Western Province	Griqua Park, Kimberley
14:30	Try: Rynard Landman 6'; Wilmaure Louw 12'; Jaco Nepgen 79'; Con: Francois Brummer 13' (1/3); Pen: Francois Brummer 43' (1/1)	Scoreboard	Try: Ederies Arendse 39'; JP du Plessis 54'; Steven Kitshoff 66'; Con: Demetri Catrakilis 40', 67' (2/3); Pen: Demetri Catrakilis 63', 70' (2/2)	Attendance: 11,272; Referee: Marius Jonker

18 August 2012	Sharks	30 – 14	Golden Lions	Kings Park Stadium, Durban
19:15	Try: S'bura Sithole 50'; Odwa Ndungane 57'; Jean Deysel 65'; Con: Meyer Bosman 51', 58', 66' (3/3); Pen: Meyer Bosman 9', 33', 45' (3/4)	Scoreboard	Try: Penalty Try 16'; Cobus Grobbelaar 61'; Con: Butch James 17', 62' (2/2); Cards: Hendrik Roodt (yellow card) 39' to 51'	Attendance: 17,838; Referee: Mark Lawrence

=== Round three ===
25 August 2012	Griquas	16 – 29	Free State Cheetahs	Griqua Park, Kimberley
15:00	Try: Rynard Landman 35'; Rocco Jansen 38'; Pen: Francois Brummer 50', 63' (2/3)	Scoreboard	Try: Lappies Labuschagné 40'; Frans Viljoen 52'; Raymond Rhule 55'; Sarel Pretorius 66'; Con: Johan Goosen 40' (1/1); Sias Ebersohn 53' (1/2); Nico Scheepers 67' (1/1); Pen: Johan Goosen 32' (1/3)	Attendance: 5,263; Referee: Craig Joubert

25 August 2012	Golden Lions	26 – 23	Western Province	Ellis Park Stadium, Johannesburg
17:05	Try: Josh Strauss 27'; Pen: Elton Jantjies 15', 37', 45', 64', 66', 74', 84' (7/7); Cards: CJ van der Linde (yellow card) 78' to 88'	Scoreboard	Try: Gerhard van den Heever 9'; Brok Harris 78'; Con: Demetri Catrakilis 10', 79' (2/2); Pen: Demetri Catrakilis 13', 56', 72' (3/4)	Attendance: 13,236; Referee: Stuart Berry

25 August 2012	Blue Bulls	42 – 31	Sharks	Loftus Versfeld, Pretoria
19:10	Try: CJ Stander 51'; Arno Botha 64'; Francois Venter 70'; Con: Louis Fouche 52', 65', 71' (3/3); Pen: Louis Fouche 3', 16', 26', 43', 49', 60' (6/6); Drop: Louis Fouche 38' (1/2)	Scoreboard Report	Try: Jean Deysel 22'; Charl McLeod 40'; Marius Joubert 56'; Odwa Ndungane 80'; Con: Riaan Viljoen 23', 40', 57', 81' (4/4); Pen: Riaan Viljoen 47' (1/1)	Attendance: 14,647; Referee: Jaco Peyper

=== Round four ===
31 August 2012	Golden Lions	32 – 42	Griquas	Ellis Park Stadium, Johannesburg
19:10	Try: Ross Cronjé 5'; Jaco Kriel 33'; Anthony Volmink 68', 70'; Con: Elton Jantjies 34' (1/2); Andries Coetzee 69' (1/1); Butch James 71' (1/1); Pen: Elton Jantjies 10', 27' (2/2)	Scoreboard	Try: Rocco Jansen 15'; Jannie Boshoff 22'; Ryno Barnes 35'; Willie le Roux 44'; Jean Stemmet 77'; Con: Francois Brummer 16', 23', 45', 78' (4/5); Pen: Francois Brummer 5', 12', 32' (3/3)	Attendance: 7,639; Referee: Craig Joubert

1 September 2012	Sharks	34 – 32	Free State Cheetahs	Kings Park Stadium, Durban
17:05	Try: Riaan Viljoen 48'; Odwa Ndungane 61' 67'; Meyer Bosman 76'; Con: Meyer Bosman 49', 62', 68', 77' (4/4); Pen: Meyer Bosman 5', 36' (2/2)	Scoreboard	Try: Sarel Pretorius 36'; Raymond Rhule 38'; Nico Scheepers 56'; Con: Nico Scheepers 37' (1/2); Sias Ebersohn (0/1); Pen: Nico Scheepers 14', 24', 54' (3/4); Drop: Sias Ebersohn 27', 65' (2/2)	Attendance: 18,874; Referee: Rasta Rasivhenge

1 September 2012	Western Province	42 – 6	Blue Bulls	Newlands Stadium, Cape Town
19:10	Try: Nic Groom 19'; Deon Fourie 38'; Marcel Brache 46'; Damian de Allende 58'; JP du Plessis 66'; Con: Demetri Catrakilis 20', 39', 47', 59' (4/5); Pen: Demetri Catrakilis 11', 50', 63' (3/4)	Scoreboard Report	Pen: Louis Fouché 30', 32' (2/3)	Attendance: 27,674; Referee: Lourens van der Merwe

=== Round Five ===
8 September 2012	Griquas	22 – 15	Sharks	Griqua Park, Kimberley
15:00	Try: Marnus Schoeman 18'; Con: Francois Brummer 19' (1/1); Pen: Francois Brummer 6', 31', 37', 53', 75' (5/5); Cards: Leon Karemaker (yellow card) 50' to 60'	Scoreboard	Pen: Meyer Bosman 11', 24', 34', 43', 50' (5/5)	Attendance: 8,047; Referee: Pro Legoete

8 September 2012	Blue Bulls	23 – 32	Golden Lions	Loftus Versfeld, Pretoria
17:05	Try: Ruan Snyman 13'; Francois Venter 45'; Clayton Blommetjies 72'; Con: Louis Fouche 46' (1/3); Pen: Louis Fouche 17', 71' (2/5)	Scoreboard Report	Try: Deon Helberg 40'; Alwyn Hollenbach 41'; Jaco Taute 51'; Lionel Mapoe 76'; Con: Elton Jantjies 40', 52', 77' (3/4); Pen: Elton Jantjies 9', 60' (2/5)	Attendance: 16,062; Referee: Jason Jaftha

8 September 2012	Free State Cheetahs	22 – 29	Western Province	Free State Stadium, Bloemfontein
19:10	Try: Sarel Pretorius 26'; Con: Nico Scheepers 27' (1/1); Pen: Nico Scheepers 6', 16', 30', 39', 60' (5/6)	Scoreboard	Try: Gio Aplon 2'; Marcel Brache 66'; Con: Demetri Catrakilis 3', 67' (2/2); Pen: Demetri Catrakilis 25', 34', 51', 54', 57' (5/5)	Attendance: 17,876; Referee: Jonathan Kaplan

=== Round Six ===
15 September 2012	Griquas	49 – 34	Blue Bulls	Griqua Park, Kimberley
15:00	Try: Rocco Jansen 1'; Walter Venter 10'; Francois Brummer 24'; Jean Stemmet 54'; Marnus Schoeman 60'; Richard Lawson 76'; Con: Francois Brummer 11', 61' (2/6); Pen: Francois Brummer 5', 9', 40', 73' (4/4); Drop: Francois Brummer 31' (1/1)	Scoreboard Report	Try: Rudy Paige 33'; Willie Wepener 38'; Akona Ndungane 46'; Werner Kruger 69'; CJ Stander 82'; Con: Louis Fouché 33', 39', 69' (3/5); Pen: Louis Fouché 45' (1/1)	Attendance: 15,045; Referee: Jaco Peyper

15 September 2012	Free State Cheetahs	23 – 38	Golden Lions	Free State Stadium, Bloemfontein
17:05	Try: Marcel van der Merwe 17', 70'; Con: Nico Scheepers 18', 71' (2/2); Pen: Nico Scheepers 9', 25', 27' (3/5)	Scoreboard	Try: Franco van der Merwe 10'; Ruan Combrinck 39', 75'; Deon Helberg 41'; Con: Elton Jantjies 11', 40', 42' (2/3); Pen: Elton Jantjies 2', 5', 60', 63' (4/5); Ruan Combrinck (0/1); Cards: Franco van der Merwe (yellow card) 49' to 59'	Attendance: 15,399; Referee: Sindile Mayende

15 September 2012	Sharks	43 – 27	Western Province	Kings Park Stadium, Durban
19:10	Try: Jacques Botes 17', 69'; Keegan Daniel 61' penalty try 82'; Con: Meyer Bosman 18', 62', 70', 83' (4/4); Pen: Meyer Bosman 2', 7', 37', 44', 50' (5/6); Cards: Jean Deysel (yellow card) 53' to 63'	Scoreboard	Try: Louis Schreuder 65', 72'; Con: Demetri Catrakilis 66' (1/1); Joe Pietersen (0/1); Pen: Demetri Catrakilis 5', 14', 27', 40', 59' (5/5); Drop: Marcel Brache (0/1); Cards: Jebb Sinclair (red card) 53'; Tyrone Holmes (red card) 68'; Wilhelm van der Sluys (yellow card) 75'	Attendance: 27,037; Referee: Lourens van der Merwe

=== Round Seven ===
22 September 2012	Western Province	45 – 21	Griquas	Newlands Stadium, Cape Town
15:00	Try: Joe Pietersen 4'; Gerhard van den Heever 17'; Marcel Brache 29'; Deon Fourie 33'; Scarra Ntubeni 62'; Jebb Sinclair 75'; Con: Demetri Catrakilis 5', 18', 30', 34', 63', 76' (6/6); Pen: Joe Pietersen 25' (1/2); Cards: Don Armand (yellow card) 80'	Scoreboard	Try: Marnus Schoeman 12' penalty try 55'; Rocco Jansen 78'; Con: Francois Brummer 13', 56' (2/2); Marnitz Boshoff 78' (1/1)	Attendance: 18,027; Referee: Stuart Berry

22 September 2012	Blue Bulls	34 – 30	Free State Cheetahs	Loftus Versfeld, Pretoria
17:05	Try: Sampie Mastriet 12'; Franco Mostert 42'; CJ Stander 76'; Con: Louis Fouché 42', 77' (2/3); Pen: Louis Fouché 4', 21', 29', 33', 44' (5/8); Drop: Louis Fouché (0/2)	Scoreboard Report	Try: Raymond Rhule 54'; Nico Scheepers 62'; Marcel van der Merwe 79'; Con: Nico Scheepers 55', 63', 79' (3/3); Pen: Nico Scheepers 9', 18', 40' (3/4)	Attendance: 17,374; Referee: Rasta Rasivhenge

22 September 2012	Golden Lions	28 – 22	Sharks	Ellis Park Stadium, Johannesburg
19:10	Try: Ruan Combrinck 69'; Jaco Kriel 72'; Con: Elton Jantjies (0/2); Pen: Elton Jantjies 19', 28', 47', 50', 54', 66' (6/6); Drop: Elton Jantjies (0/1)	Scoreboard	Try: Odwa Ndungane 32'; Cobus Reinach 40'; Con: Meyer Bosman (0/2); Pen: Riaan Viljoen (0/1); Meyer Bosman 20', 30', 57', 59' (4/4)	Attendance: 31,045; Referee: Jason Jaftha

=== Round Eight ===
28 September 2012	Sharks	13 – 12	Blue Bulls	Kings Park Stadium, Durban
19:10	Try: Paul Jordaan 21'; Keegan Daniel 45'; Con: Meyer Bosman (0/2); Pen: Meyer Bosman 53' (1/2); Cards: Pieter Dixon (red card) 69'	Scoreboard Report	Pen: Louis Fouché 29', 40', 70' (3/3); Drop: Louis Fouché 3' (1/3)	Attendance: 26,383; Referee: Mark Lawrence

29 September 2012	Free State Cheetahs	35 – 20	Griquas	Free State Stadium, Bloemfontein
14:00	Try: Ross Geldenhuys 9'; Robert Ebersohn 23'; Hennie Daniller 70'; Raymond Rhule 83'; Con: Nico Scheepers 10', 24', 71' (3/4); Pen: Nico Scheepers 30', 55', 67' (3/3); Drop: Sias Ebersohn (0/1)	Scoreboard	Try: Marnus Schoeman 51'; Jannie Boshoff 59'; Con: Francois Brummer 52', 60' (2/2); Pen: Francois Brummer 20', 34' (2/3); Cards: Willie le Roux (yellow card) 22' to 32'; JP Nel (yellow card) 70' to 81'	Attendance: 15,278; Referee: Jason Jaftha

29 September 2012	Western Province	9 – 22	Golden Lions	Newlands Stadium, Cape Town
14:00	Pen: Demetri Catrakilis 45', 47' (2/3); Joe Pietersen 23' (1/1)	Scoreboard	Try: Deon Helberg 65'; Con: Butch James 66' (1/1); Pen: Butch James 2', 37', 42', 71' (4/4); Ruan Combrinck 52' (1/1); Drop: Butch James (0/1); Cards: Butch James (yellow card) 47' to 57'	Attendance: 5,087; Referee: Marius Jonker

=== Round Nine ===
5 October 2012	Blue Bulls	26 – 13	Western Province	Loftus Versfeld, Pretoria
19:10	Try: Akona Ndungane 37'; Con: Louis Fouché (0/1); Pen: Louis Fouché 4', 27', 45', 50', 52', 72', 79' (7/8); Drop: Louis Fouché (0/2)	Scoreboard Report	Try: penalty try 69'; Con: Demetri Catrakilis 70' (1/1); Pen: Demetri Catrakilis 40', 48' (2/3)	Attendance: 15,677; Referee: Jonathan Kaplan

6 October 2012	Griquas	37 – 21	Golden Lions	Griqua Park, Kimberley
14:00	Try: Lourens Adriaanse 28'; Leon Karemaker 37'; Rocco Jansen 38', 79'; Con: Francois Brummer 29', 38', 63', 80' (4/4); Pen: Francois Brummer 46', 54', 76' (3/4)	Scoreboard	Try: Cobus Grobbelaar 19'; Michael Rhodes 23'; Con: Butch James 15' (1/2); Pen: Butch James 9', 40', 68' (3/4)	Attendance: 6,935; Referee: Mark Lawrence

6 October 2012	Free State Cheetahs	30 – 37	Sharks	Free State Stadium, Bloemfontein
19:15	Try: Raymond Rhule 11', 80'; Sarel Pretorius 54'; Con: Nico Scheepers 12', 55' (2/2); Tewis de Bruyn 80' (1/1); Pen: Nico Scheepers 7', 47', 66' (3/3)	Scoreboard	Try: Odwa Ndungane 28', 28'; Paul Jordaan 28'; Jacques Botes 28'; Kyle Cooper 28'; Con: Meyer Bosman 25', 42', 72' (3/4), Riaan Viljoen (0/1); Pen: Meyer Bosman 16', 51' (2/2)	Attendance: 21,932; Referee: Jason Jaftha

=== Round Ten ===
12 October 2012	Sharks	42 – 3	Griquas	Kings Park Stadium, Durban
19:10	Try: Cobus Reinach 8'; Louis Ludik 27'; Lwazi Mvovo 37'; Tera Mtembu 69'; Charl McLeod 78'; Con: Patrick Lambie 9', 38', 70', 79' (4/5); Pen: Patrick Lambie 14', 44', 52' (3/4); Cards: Keegan Daniel (yellow card) 31' to 41'	Scoreboard	Pen: Francois Brummer 18' (1/2); Cards: Jannie Boshoff (yellow card) 39' to 49'	Attendance: 17,156; Referee: Jaco Peyper

13 October 2012	Western Province	36 – 15	Free State Cheetahs	Newlands Stadium, Cape Town
17:05	Try: Jean de Villiers 9'; Andries Bekker 28'; Deon Fourie 37', 50'; Duane Vermeulen 59'; Con: Demetri Catrakilis 29', 38', 51', 60' (4/5); Pen: Demetri Catrakilis 3' (1/1); Joe Pietersen (0/1)	Scoreboard	Try: Francois Uys 76'; Philip Snyman 80'; Con: Tewis de Bruyn 81' (1/2); Pen: Nico Scheepers 20' (1/2)	Attendance: 19,247; Referee: Jonathan Kaplan

13 October 2012	Golden Lions	29 – 50	Blue Bulls	Ellis Park Stadium, Johannesburg
19:10	Try: Michael Rhodes 13'; Anthony Volmink 53'; Con: Butch James 14', 54' (2/2); Pen: Butch James 8', 12', 17', 43', 47' (5/5)	Scoreboard Report	Try: Bjorn Basson 32'; Jano Vermaak 49'; Arno Botha 59'; Dewald Potgieter 63'; Akona Ndungane 74'; Con: Morné Steyn 33', 50', 60', 64' (4/4); Louis Fouché 75' (1/1); Pen: Morné Steyn 5', 23', 28', 40' (4/5); Drop: Morné Steyn 15' (1/2)	Attendance: 22,938; Referee: Craig Joubert

=== Title Play-Off Games ===
==== Semi-finals ====
20 October 2012	Sharks	20 – 3	Blue Bulls	Kings Park Stadium, Durban
16:30	Try: Lwazi Mvovo 74'; Pen: Patrick Lambie 22', 30', 33', 47', 68' (5/5)	Scoreboard Report	Pen: Morné Steyn 62'; Cards: Morné Mellett (yellow card) 30' to 40'	Attendance: 35,835; Referee: Mark Lawrence

20 October 2012	Golden Lions	16 – 21	Western Province	Ellis Park Stadium, Johannesburg
19:00	Try: Michael Rhodes 49'; Con: Elton Jantjies 50'; Pen: Ruan Combrinck 17'; Elton Jantjies 44', 79'(2)	Scoreboard	Try: Joe Pietersen 72'; Duane Vermeulen 80'; Con: Joe Pietersen 62'; Pen: Demetri Catrakilis 4', 30' (2); Joe Pietersen 76'; Cards: Gerhard van den Heever (yellow card) 6' to 17'	Attendance: 31,947; Referee: Marius Jonker

==== Final ====
27 October 2012	Sharks	18 – 25	Western Province	Kings Park Stadium, Durban
17:00	Pen: Patrick Lambie 5', 13', 18', 27', 44', 56' (6/6)	Scoreboard	Try: Juan de Jongh 36'; Con: Demetri Catrakilis 37' (1/1); Pen: Demetri Catrakilis 3', 40', 64' (3); Joe Pietersen 33' (1/2); Drop: Demetri Catrakilis 66', 76' (2/3)	Attendance: 48,328; Referee: Jaco Peyper

== Promotion/Relegation Games ==
=== Tables ===
2012 Currie Cup Promotion Relegation Games Table
Pos	Team	Pld	W	D	L	PF	PA	PD	TF	TA	TB	LB	Pts
1	Free State Cheetahs (P)	2	2	0	0	69	20	+49	9	2	1	0	9
2	Eastern Province Kings (F)	2	0	0	2	20	69	−49	2	9	0	0	0

Rules for classification: 4 points for a win; 2 points for a draw; 1 bonus point for a loss by seven points or less; 1 bonus point for scoring four or more tries in a match
(F) Qualified for the 2013 Currie Cup First Division; (P) Qualified for the 2013 Currie Cup Premier Division

=== Results ===
19 October 2012	Free State Cheetahs	53 – 14	Eastern Province Kings	Free State Stadium, Bloemfontein
19:10	Try: Nico Scheepers 5' m Ross Geldenhuys 12' m Philip van der Walt 26' c Andries Strauss (2) 30' c, 50' m Adriaan Strauss 56' c Rayno Benjamin 66' c Penalty try 75' c Con: Nico Scheepers (2/4) 27', 31'; Tewis de Bruyn (3/3) 57', 67', 76'; Pen: Tewis de Bruyn (1/1) 62'	Scoreboard	Try: Devin Oosthuizen 47' c Shane Gates 54' c Con: George Whitehead (2/2) 47', 55'; Cards: Charl du Plessis (yellow card) 75' to 80'	Attendance: 24,167; Referee: Jonathan Kaplan

26 October 2012	Eastern Province Kings	6 – 16	Free State Cheetahs	Nelson Mandela Bay Stadium, Port Elizabeth
19:00	Pen: George Whitehead (2/2) 5', 12'; Cards: Falie Oelschig (red card) 32'	Scoreboard	Try: Sias Ebersohn 63' c Con: Nico Scheepers (1/1) 64'; Pen: Nico Scheepers (3/3) 62', 72', 78'	Attendance: 24,948; Referee: Craig Joubert

- Free State Cheetahs remain in the Premier Division for 2013.
- Eastern Province Kings remain in the First Division for 2013.

== Players ==
=== Player statistics ===
==== Leading try scorers ====
Top 10 try scorers
Pos	Name	Team	Tries
1	Raymond Rhule	Free State Cheetahs	8
2	Rocco Jansen	Griquas	7
2	Odwa Ndungane	Sharks	7
4	CJ Stander	Blue Bulls	5
5	Ruan Combrinck	Golden Lions	4
5	Marnus Schoeman	Griquas	4
5	Sarel Pretorius	Free State Cheetahs	4
8	Marcel Brache	Western Province	3
8	Deon Fourie	Western Province	3
8	Deon Helberg	Golden Lions	3
8	Marcel van der Merwe	Free State Cheetahs	3
8	Akona Ndungane	Blue Bulls	3
8	Paul Jordaan	Sharks	3
8	Jacques Botes	Sharks	3

Source: South African Rugby Union

==== Leading point scorers ====
Top 10 overall point scorers
Pos	Name	Team	Points	Analysis of points
1	Louis Fouché	Blue Bulls	135	12 Con 35 Pen 2 Drp
2	Francois Brummer	Griquas	110	1 Try 18 Con 21 Pen 2 Drp
3	Meyer Bosman	Sharks	106	1 Try 16 Con 23 Pen
4	Demetri Catrakilis	Western Province	102	18 Con 22 Pen
5	Nico Scheepers	Free State Cheetahs	99	2 Tries 13 Con 21 Pen
6	Elton Jantjies	Golden Lions	77	7 Con 21 Pen
7	Butch James	Golden Lions	52	8 Con 12 Pen
8	Raymond Rhule	Free State Cheetahs	40	8 Tries
9	Odwa Ndungane	Sharks	35	7 Tries
9	Rocco Jansen	Griquas	35	7 Tries
11	Riaan Smit	Free State Cheetahs	29	4 Con 7 Pen
12	CJ Stander	Blue Bulls	25	5 Tries

Source: South African Rugby Union Correct as at 6 October 2012

== Awards ==
Month	Coach	Player
August	John Plumtree, Sharks	Louis Fouché, Blue Bulls
September	Johan Ackermann, Golden Lions	Elton Jantjies, Golden Lions
October	John Plumtree, Sharks	Cobus Reinach, Sharks

== See also ==
- 2012 Currie Cup First Division
- 2012 Vodacom Cup
- 2012 Under-21 Provincial Championship
- 2012 Under-19 Provincial Championship
