= 2013 Currie Cup Premier Division =

Domestic rugby union competition

- Countries: South Africa
- Date: 9 August – 26 October 2013
- Champions: Sharks (7th title)
- Runners-up: Western Province
- Matches played: 33
- Tries scored: 175 (average 5.3 per match)
- Top point scorer: Marnitz Boshoff (92)
- Top try scorer: Raymond Rhule (7)

The 2013 Currie Cup Premier Division was the 75th season in the competition since it started in 1889 and was contested from 10 August to 26 October 2013. The tournament (known as the Absa Currie Cup Premier Division for sponsorship reasons) was the top tier of South Africa's premier domestic rugby union competition.

== Competition ==
=== Regular season and title playoffs ===
There were 6 participating teams in the 2013 Currie Cup Premier Division. These teams played each other twice over the course of the season, once at home and once away.

Teams received four points for a win and two points for a draw. Bonus points were awarded to teams that score 4 or more tries in a game, as well as to teams losing a match by 7 points or less. Teams were ranked by log points.

The top 4 teams qualified for the title play-offs. In the semifinals, the team that finished first had home advantage against the team that finished fourth, while the team that finished second had home advantage against the team that finished third. The winners of these semi-finals played each other in the final, at the home venue of the higher-placed team.

=== Relegation playoffs ===
The bottom team on the log qualified for the promotion/relegation play-offs. That team played off against the team placed first in the 2013 Currie Cup First Division over two legs. The winner over these two ties (determined via team tables, with all Currie Cup ranking regulations in effect) qualified for the 2014 Currie Cup Premier Division, while the losing team qualified for the 2014 Currie Cup First Division.

== Teams ==
Location of teams in 2013 Currie Cup Premier Division

2013 Currie Cup Premier Division teams
Team	Sponsored Name	Stadium/s	Sponsored Name
Blue Bulls	Vodacom Blue Bulls	Loftus Versfeld, Pretoria	Loftus Versfeld
Free State Cheetahs	Toyota Free State Cheetahs	Free State Stadium, Bloemfontein	Free State Stadium
Golden Lions	MTN Golden Lions	Ellis Park Stadium, Johannesburg	Ellis Park Stadium
Griquas	GWK Griquas	Griqua Park, Kimberley	GWK Park
Sharks	Sharks	Kings Park Stadium, Durban	Growthpoint Kings Park
Western Province	DHL Western Province	Newlands Stadium, Cape Town	DHL Newlands

== Log ==
=== Final standings ===
2013 Currie Cup Premier Division Log
Pos	Team	Pld	W	D	L	PF	PA	PD	TF	TA	TB	LB	Pts	Qualification
1	Western Province	10	8	2	0	245	201	+44	23	21	1	0	37	Title play-off semi-final
2	Sharks	10	7	0	3	271	223	+48	28	21	2	3	33	Title play-off semi-final
3	Free State Cheetahs	10	5	0	5	262	238	+24	31	26	3	3	26	Title play-off semi-final
4	Golden Lions	10	4	1	5	326	296	+30	40	31	5	3	26	Title play-off semi-final
5	Blue Bulls	10	3	1	6	225	253	−28	24	28	2	1	17	
6	Griquas	10	1	0	9	208	326	−118	17	36	1	6	11	Relegation Play-Offs

Rules for classification: 4 points for a win; 2 points for a draw; 1 bonus point for a loss by seven points or less; 1 bonus point for scoring four or more tries in a match

=== Round-by-round ===
Team Progression – 2013 Currie Cup Premier Division
Team	R1	R2	R3	R4	R5	R6	R7	R8	R9	R10
Western Province	2 (3rd)	6 (2nd)	10 (1st)	12 (3rd)	16 (1st)	20 (1st)	24 (2nd)	28 (2nd)	33 (1st)	37 (1st)
Sharks	1 (6th)	5 (4th)	9 (2nd)	14 (1st)	15 (2nd)	19 (2nd)	24 (1st)	28 (1st)	32 (2nd)	33 (2nd)
Free State Cheetahs	5 (1st)	6 (3rd)	7 (3rd)	12 (2nd)	12 (4th)	16 (3rd)	16 (4th)	17 (4th)	22 (3rd)	26 (3rd)
Golden Lions	1 (5th)	1 (6th)	6 (4th)	9 (4th)	14 (3rd)	15 (4th)	20 (3rd)	21 (3rd)	21 (4th)	26 (4th)
Blue Bulls	2 (4th)	6 (1st)	6 (6th)	6 (6th)	10 (5th)	10 (5th)	11 (5th)	16 (5th)	17 (5th)	17 (5th)
Griquas	4 (2nd)	5 (5th)	6 (5th)	6 (5th)	8 (6th)	9 (6th)	10 (6th)	10 (6th)	10 (6th)	11 (6th)
The table above shows a team's progression throughout the season. For each round, their cumulative points total is shown with the overall log position in brackets.
Key:	win	draw	loss							

== Fixtures and results ==
The following fixtures were released:

All times are South African (GMT+2).

=== Regular season ===
==== Round one ====
9 August 2013	Sharks	30–32	Griquas	Kings Park Stadium, Durban
19:10	Try: Jacques Botes 29', 39'; Lwazi Mvovo 66'; Con: Butch James 30', 40', 67' (3/3); Pen: Butch James 16', 21', 77' (3/3)	Scoreboard; Report	Try: Marnus Schoeman 3'; Carel Greeff 82'; Con: Nico Scheepers 4', 83' (2/2); Pen: Nico Scheepers 9', 14', 32', 50', 59', 74' (6/6)	Attendance: 8,421; Referee: Jason Jaftha

10 August 2013	Golden Lions	29–30	Free State Cheetahs	Ellis Park Stadium, Johannesburg
15:00	Try: Stokkies Hanekom 33'; Willie Britz 63'; Ruan Dreyer 70'; Con: Marnitz Boshoff 34' (1/1); Elton Jantjies (0/2); Pen: Marnitz Boshoff 3', 15', 38', 51' (4/4)	Scoreboard; Report	Try: Robert Ebersohn 5'; Boom Prinsloo 30'; Sarel Pretorius 45'; Johann Sadie 54'; Con: Riaan Smit 46' (1/3); Elgar Watts 55' (1/1); Pen: Riaan Smit 18' (1/1); Elgar Watts 68' (1/1)	Attendance: 14,711; Referee: Marius van der Westhuizen

10 August 2013	Western Province	24–24	Blue Bulls	Newlands Stadium, Cape Town
17:05	Try: Gio Aplon 9'; Patrick Howard 20'; Nizaam Carr 58'; Con: Gary van Aswegen 10', 21', 59' (3/3); Pen: Gary van Aswegen 77' (1/1); Drop: Gary van Aswegen (0/1)	Scoreboard; Report	Try: Francois Venter 68'; Jean Cook 79'; Con: Tony Jantjies 69' (1/2); Pen: Jurgen Visser (0/1); Tony Jantjies 15', 28', 53', 74' (4/5)	Attendance: 23,621; Referee: Rasta Rasivhenge

==== Round two ====
16 August 2013	Sharks	33–25	Golden Lions	Kings Park Stadium, Durban
17:05	Try: Brynard Stander 22'; Heimar Williams 31'; SP Marais 74'; Con: Butch James 23', 32' (2/2); Fred Zeilinga 75' (1/1); Pen: Butch James 9', 14', 51' (3/3); Fred Zeilinga 72' (1/1); Cards: Odwa Ndungane (yellow card) 37' to 47'	Scoreboard; Report	Try: Anthony Volmink 11', 19'; Jaco Kriel 48'; Con: Elton Jantjies 12', 20' (2/3); Pen: Elton Jantjies 6', 66' (2/2); Drop: Marnitz Boshoff (0/1)	Attendance: 15,944; Referee: Ben Crouse

16 August 2013	Blue Bulls	15–9	Griquas	Loftus Versfeld, Pretoria
19:10	Pen: Tony Jantjies 13', 40' (2/4); Jurgen Visser 65', 68', 77' (3/5); Cards: Ruan Snyman (yellow card) 58' to 69'	Scoreboard; Report	Pen: Nico Scheepers (0/2); Francois Brummer 21', 33', 81' (3/3)	Attendance: 9,861; Referee: Marius van der Westhuizen

17 August 2013	Western Province	15–14	Free State Cheetahs	Newlands Stadium, Cape Town
18:00	Try: Michael Rhodes 23'; Deon Fourie 75'; Con: Gary van Aswegen 24' (1/1); Kurt Coleman (0/1); Pen: Gary van Aswegen 22' (1/2); Cards: Steven Kitshoff (yellow card) 34' to 44'	Scoreboard; Report	Try: Elgar Watts 7'; Riaan Smit 16'; Con: Riaan Smit 8' (1/1); Elgar Watts 17' (1/1); Pen: Riaan Smit (0/1)	Attendance: 13,833; Referee: Jonathan Kaplan

==== Round three ====
23 August 2013	Free State Cheetahs	15–18	Sharks	Free State Stadium, Bloemfontein
19:10	Try: Lappies Labuschagné 21'; Raymond Rhule 25'; Con: Riaan Smit 26' (1/2); Pen: Riaan Smit 2' (1/1); Cards: Boom Prinsloo (yellow card) 32' to 41'	Scoreboard; Report	Try: Jean Deysel 40'; Louis Ludik 65'; Con: Fred Zeilinga 40' (1/1); Butch James (0/1); Pen: Fred Zeilinga 5' (1/2); Drop: Fred Zeilinga 13' (1/1)	Attendance: 16,459; Referee: Jason Jaftha

24 August 2013	Griquas	19–20	Western Province	Griqua Park, Kimberley
15:00	Try: PJ Vermeulen 80'; Con: DuRandt Gerber 81' (1/1); Pen: Nico Scheepers 15', 45', 56', 70' (4/6)	Scoreboard; Report	Try: Deon Fourie 4'; Juan de Jongh 65'; Con: Kurt Coleman 5', 66' (2/2); Pen: Kurt Coleman 37', 53' (2/2)	Attendance: 12,822; Referee: Sindile Mayende

24 August 2013	Blue Bulls	23–62	Golden Lions	Loftus Versfeld, Pretoria
17:05	Try: Travis Ismaiel 13'; Jurgen Visser 24'; Francois Venter 43'; Con: Tony Jantjies (0/1); Jurgen Visser 44' (1/2); Pen: Tony Jantjies 4' (1/1); Jurgen Visser 39' (1/3); Drop: Tony Jantjies (0/1); Cards: Morné Mellett (yellow card) 50' to 60'	Scoreboard; Report	Try: Jaco Kriel 17'; Deon Helberg 30'; Willie Britz 50'; Derick Minnie 54', 59'; Anthony Volmink 65'; Warwick Tecklenburg 71'; Elton Jantjies 76'; Con: Marnitz Boshoff 18', 31', 51', 55', 60', 66', 72', 77' (8/8); Pen: Marnitz Boshoff 7', 40' (2/2); Drop: Marnitz Boshoff (0/1)	Attendance: 19,846; Referee: Jonathan Kaplan

==== Round four ====
30 August 2013	Golden Lions	31–31	Western Province	Ellis Park Stadium, Johannesburg
19:10	Try: Deon Helberg 35' penalty try 46'; Elton Jantjies 63'; Derick Minnie 69'; Con: Marnitz Boshoff 36', 47', 64', 70' (4/4); Pen: Marnitz Boshoff 24' (1/1)	Scoreboard; Report	Try: Damian de Allende 5'; Cheslin Kolbe 10'; Tiaan Liebenberg 28'; Con: Kurt Coleman 11', 29' (2/3); Pen: Kurt Coleman 16', 39', 51', 80' (4/4); Cards: Damian de Allende (yellow card) 46' to 57'	Attendance: 25,253; Referee: Jaco Peyper

31 August 2013	Free State Cheetahs	40–20	Griquas	Free State Stadium, Bloemfontein
15:00	Try: Boom Prinsloo 23', 40'; Raymond Rhule 36'; Elgar Watts 49'; Kevin Luiters 82'; Con: Riaan Smit 37', 40' (2/3); Elgar Watts 50' (1/2); Pen: Riaan Smit 15' (1/1); Elgar Watts 58', 68' (2/2); Cards: Oupa Mohojé (yellow card) 52' to 62'	Scoreboard; Report	Try: Rocco Jansen 53'; Rory Arnold 62'; Con: Nico Scheepers 54', 63' (2/2); Pen: Nico Scheepers 4', 19' (2/3); Cards: Marnus Schoeman (yellow card) 57' to 68'; Rory Arnold (red card) 63'	Attendance: 8,273; Referee: Craig Joubert

31 August 2013	Sharks	34–18	Blue Bulls	Kings Park Stadium, Durban
17:05	Try: SP Marais 7'; Heimar Williams 55'; Charl McLeod 61'; Marco Wentzel 70'; Con: Fred Zeilinga 8', 56', 62', 71' (4/4); Pen: Fred Zeilinga 13', 40' (2/3); Cards: Dale Chadwick (yellow card) 66' to 76'	Scoreboard; Report	Try: Akona Ndungane 5', 75'; Con: Handré Pollard 6' (1/2); Pen: Handré Pollard 36', 49' (2/3); Cards: Frik Kirsten (yellow card) 21' to 31'	Attendance: 21,938; Referee: Jonathan Kaplan

==== Round Five ====
7 September 2013	Griquas	32–38	Golden Lions	Griqua Park, Kimberley
15:00	Try: Jean Stemmet 3'; PJ Vermeulen 20'; Carel Greeff 37'; Howard Mnisi 60'; Con: Francois Brummer 21', 38', 61' (3/4); Pen: Francois Brummer 51', 57' (2/2); Drop: Francois Brummer (0/1)	Scoreboard; Report	Try: Robbie Coetzee 8'; Anthony Volmink 18'; Andries Coetzee 28'; Franco van der Merwe 52'; Marnitz Boshoff 62'; Jaco Kriel 67'; Con: Marnitz Boshoff 9' (1/3); Elton Jantjies 53', 63', 68' (3/3); Pen: Marnitz Boshoff (0/1); Cards: Anthony Volmink (yellow card) 72'	Attendance: 4,383; Referee: Jason Jaftha

7 September 2013	Blue Bulls	26–10	Free State Cheetahs	Loftus Versfeld, Pretoria
17:05	Try: Paul Willemse 63'; Wiaan Liebenberg 78'; Con: Handré Pollard 64', 79' (2/2); Pen: Handré Pollard 3', 47', 50', 57' (4/5); Drop: Handré Pollard (0/1)	Scoreboard; Report	Try: Riaan Smit 10'; Elgar Watts 70'; Con: Riaan Smit (0/1); Elgar Watts (0/1); Pen: Riaan Smit (0/1)	Attendance: 18,567; Referee: Stuart Berry

7 September 2013	Western Province	25–19	Sharks	Newlands Stadium, Cape Town
19:10	Try: Juan de Jongh 16'; Cheslin Kolbe 23'; Gio Aplon 60'; Con: Kurt Coleman 24' (1/2); Gary van Aswegen 61' (1/1); Pen: Kurt Coleman 2', 43' (2/2)	Scoreboard; Report	Try: Lwazi Mvovo 57'; Jacques Botes 67'; Kyle Cooper 83'; Con: Fred Zeilinga 67', 84' (2/3); Pen: Butch James (0/1)	Attendance: 28,698; Referee: Craig Joubert

==== Round Six ====
13 September 2013	Free State Cheetahs	26–23	Golden Lions	Free State Stadium, Bloemfontein
19:10	Try: Johann Sadie 8'; Sarel Pretorius 39'; Con: Riaan Smit 9', 40' (2/2); Pen: Riaan Smit 24', 29', 35', 77' (4/4); Drop: Elgar Watts (0/1)	Scoreboard; Report	Try: Ruhan Nel 59'; Anthony Volmink 63'; Con: Elton Jantjies 60', 64' (2/2); Pen: Elton Jantjies 21', 51', 73' (3/3); Marnitz Boshoff (0/1); Cards: Elton Jantjies (yellow card) 30' to 40'	Attendance: 14,476; Referee: Marius van der Westhuizen

14 September 2013	Griquas	24–25	Sharks	Griqua Park, Kimberley
15:00	Try: Marnus Schoeman 37'; Burger Schoeman 48'; Con: Francois Brummer 49' (1/2); Pen: Francois Brummer 14', 19', 25', 27' (4/5); Cards: Ryno Barnes (yellow card) 74'	Scoreboard; Report	Try: Sizo Maseko 30'; Wiehahn Herbst 75'; Con: Butch James (0/1); Fred Zeilinga (0/1); Pen: Butch James 3', 23', 46' (3/3); Fred Zeilinga 61', 65' (2/5)	Attendance: 5,675; Referee: Jaco Peyper

14 September 2013	Blue Bulls	18–29	Western Province	Loftus Versfeld, Pretoria
17:05	Try: Jono Ross 43'; David Bulbring 76'; Con: Handré Pollard 44' (1/2); Pen: Handré Pollard 31' (1/3); Drop: Handré Pollard 10' (1/1); Cards: Jacques Engelbrecht (yellow card) 59' to 70'	Scoreboard; Report	Try: Gio Aplon 13'; Damian de Allende 38'; Con: Kurt Coleman 14', 39' (2/2); Pen: Kurt Coleman 4', 27', 48' (3/4); Gary van Aswegen 66', 74' (2/2); Cards: Michael Rhodes (red card) 35'	Attendance: 22,876; Referee: Marius Jonker

==== Round Seven ====
20 September 2013	Western Province	19–13	Griquas	Newlands Stadium, Cape Town
19:10	Try: Nic Groom 49'; Con: Kurt Coleman 50' (1/1); Pen: Kurt Coleman 7', 22', 45' (3/3); Demetri Catrakilis 76' (1/1); Cards: Gerhard van den Heever (yellow card) 34' to 43'	Scoreboard; Report	Try: Nico Scheepers 24'; Con: Nico Scheepers 24' (1/1); Pen: Francois Brummer 2' (1/2); Nico Scheepers (0/1); Gouws Prinsloo 64' (1/1)	Attendance: 19,214; Referee: Lourens van der Merwe

21 September 2013	Sharks	50–26	Free State Cheetahs	Kings Park Stadium, Durban
15:00	Try: SP Marais 3'; Lwazi Mvovo 14', 58'; Heimar Williams 24'; Tim Whitehead 45'; Keegan Daniel 67'; Cobus Reinach 74'; Con: Fred Zeilinga 25', 68', 75' (3/7); Pen: Fred Zeilinga 19', 27', 34' (3/3)	Scoreboard; Report	Try: Raymond Rhule 31'; AJ le Roux 78'; Con: Riaan Smit 32', 79' (2/2); Pen: Riaan Smit 12', 22', 37', 43' (4/4)	Attendance: 21,412; Referee: Marius Jonker

21 September 2013	Golden Lions	35–26	Blue Bulls	Ellis Park Stadium, Johannesburg
17:05	Try: Andries Coetzee 5'; Jaco Kriel 14'; Ruan Dreyer 45'; Jacques van Rooyen 57'; Marnitz Boshoff 61'; Con: Elton Jantjies 46', 62' (2/5); Pen: Marnitz Boshoff 72' (1/2); Elton Jantjies 9' (1/1)	Scoreboard; Report	Try: Rudy Paige 30'; Bjorn Basson 55', 79'; Francois Venter 73'; Con: Tony Jantjies 31', 56', 79' (3/4); Pen: Tony Jantjies (0/1); Cards: Clayton Blommetjies (yellow card) 19' to 29'; Tony Jantjies (yellow card) 33' to 43'	Attendance: 23,851; Referee: Stuart Berry

==== Round Eight ====
27 September 2013	Free State Cheetahs	27–29	Western Province	Free State Stadium, Bloemfontein
17:05	Try: Hennie Daniller 11', 27'; Sarel Pretorius 54'; Con: Riaan Smit 12', 28' (2/2); Elgar Watts 55' (1/1); Pen: Riaan Smit 3' (1/1); Elgar Watts 74' (1/2)	Scoreboard; Report	Try: Cheslin Kolbe 13'; Michael Rhodes 63'; Con: Kurt Coleman 14' (1/2); Demetri Catrakilis 64' (1/1); Pen: Kurt Coleman 19', 26', 43' (3/5); Demetri Catrakilis 68' (1/1); Drop: Demetri Catrakilis 79' (1/1)	Attendance: 17,876; Referee: Marius Jonker

27 September 2013	Golden Lions	25–31	Sharks	Ellis Park Stadium, Johannesburg
19:10	Try: Derick Minnie 26'; Warren Whiteley 38'; Jaco Kriel 65'; Con: Elton Jantjies 27', 39' (2/2); Marnitz Boshoff (0/1); Pen: Elton Jantjies 5', 35' (2/2)	Scoreboard; Report	Try: Fred Zeilinga 14'; SP Marais 50'; Cobus Reinach 68'; Con: Fred Zeilinga 15', 69' (2/3); Pen: Fred Zeilinga 21', 45' (2/3); Drop: Fred Zeilinga 3', 12' (2/3)	Attendance: 32,724; Referee: Jason Jaftha

28 September 2013	Griquas	10–52	Blue Bulls	Griqua Park, Kimberley
14:00	Try: penalty try 35'; Con: Gouws Prinsloo 36' (1/1); Pen: Gouws Prinsloo 40' (1/1); Drop: Francois Brummer (0/1); Cards: JP Nel (yellow card) 51' to 61'	Scoreboard; Report	Try: Wiaan Liebenberg 19'; Jacques du Plessis 24'; William Small-Smith 47', 60'; Paul Willemse 53', 63'; Jurgen Visser 70'; Con: Handré Pollard 25', 42', 53', 61', 64' (5/7); Pen: Handré Pollard 8', 45', 58' (3/3); Cards: Marcel van der Merwe (yellow card) 35' to 45'	Attendance: 4,835; Referee: Quinton Immelman

==== Round Nine ====
4 October 2013	Blue Bulls	16–18	Sharks	Loftus Versfeld, Pretoria
19:10	Try: Francois Venter 62'; Con: Handré Pollard 63' (1/1); Pen: Handré Pollard 12', 34', 66' (3/5); Drop: Handré Pollard (0/2)	Scoreboard; Report	Pen: Fred Zeilinga 11', 14', 28', 44' (4/6); Butch James 66', 79' (2/2); Drop: Cobus Reinach (0/1); Cards: Jacques Botes (yellow card) 35' to 45'; Jean Deysel (yellow card) 60' to 71'	Referee: Marius van der Westhuizen

5 October 2013	Griquas	21–52	Free State Cheetahs	Griqua Park, Kimberley
14:00	Try: Dalton Davis 37'; Rory Arnold 71'; Jaco Nepgen 75'; Con: Gouws Prinsloo 38', 72', 76' (3/3)	Scoreboard; Report	Try: Schalk van der Merwe 8'; Raymond Rhule 58', 67', 73', 78'; Piet van Zyl 62'; Con: Elgar Watts 59', 63' (2/3); Willie du Plessis 68', 74', 78' (3/3); Pen: Elgar Watts 3', 20', 26', 55' (4/4)	Referee: Jonathan Kaplan

5 October 2013	Western Province	36–23	Golden Lions	Newlands Stadium, Cape Town
14:00	Try: Damian de Allende 33'; Deon Fourie 40'; Gerhard van den Heever 45'; Michael Rhodes 81'; Con: Demetri Catrakilis 40', 46' (2/3); Kurt Coleman (0/1); Pen: Demetri Catrakilis 20', 25', 44' (3/3); Kurt Coleman 69' (1/1); Cards: Scarra Ntubeni (yellow card) 73'	Scoreboard; Report	Try: Derick Minnie 57', 65'; Con: Marnitz Boshoff 58', 66' (2/2); Pen: Marnitz Boshoff 2', 7', 27' (3/4); Drop: Marnitz Boshoff (0/1)	Referee: Stuart Berry

==== Round Ten ====
12 October 2013	Golden Lions	35–28	Griquas	Ellis Park Stadium, Johannesburg
15:00	Try: Jacques van Rooyen 29'; Anthony Volmink 32'; Willie Wepener 51'; Willie Britz 76'; Con: Marnitz Boshoff 30', 52', 77' (3/4); Pen: Marnitz Boshoff 3', 55', 63' (3/3); Lionel Cronjé (0/1)	Scoreboard; Report	Try: Rocco Jansen 21'; Con: Gouws Prinsloo 22' (1/1); Pen: Gouws Prinsloo 7', 11', 18', 37', 44', 57', 70' (7/7); Cards: Simon Westraadt (yellow card) 77'	Referee: Jaco Peyper

12 October 2013	Free State Cheetahs	22–7	Blue Bulls	Free State Stadium, Bloemfontein
17:05	Try: Robert Ebersohn 8'; Elgar Watts 53'; Adriaan Strauss 78'; Con: Elgar Watts 9', 54' (2/2); Johan Goosen (0/1); Pen: Elgar Watts 14' (1/3); Cards: Schalk van der Merwe (red card) 74'	Scoreboard; Report	Try: Marcel van der Merwe 39'; Con: Handré Pollard 40' (1/1); Cards: Rudy Paige (yellow card) 32' to 43'	Referee: Marius Jonker

12 October 2013	Sharks	13–17	Western Province	Kings Park Stadium, Durban
19:10	Try: Keegan Daniel 47'; Con: Patrick Lambie 48' (1/1); Pen: Fred Zeilinga 10', 18' (2/3); Patrick Lambie (0/2); Drop: Fred Zeilinga (0/2)	Scoreboard; Report	Try: Deon Fourie 26'; Con: Demetri Catrakilis (0/1); Pen: Demetri Catrakilis 7', 39', 61' (3/3); Drop: Demetri Catrakilis 12' (1/2)	Referee: Jonathan Kaplan

=== Title Play-Off Games ===
==== Semi-finals ====
19 October 2013	Western Province	33–16	Golden Lions	Newlands Stadium, Cape Town
14:30	Try: Demetri Catrakilis 23'; Gio Aplon 37'; Con: Demetri Catrakilis 24' (1/2); Pen: Demetri Catrakilis 18', 40', 49', 52', 72' (5/6); Kurt Coleman 77', 80' (2/2); Cards: Scarra Ntubeni (yellow card) 73'	Scoreboard; Report	Try: Warren Whiteley 74'; Con: Marnitz Boshoff 75' (1/1); Pen: Marnitz Boshoff (0/1); Elton Jantjies 6', 21', 30' (3/3)	Attendance: 31,719; Referee: Marius Jonker

19 October 2013	Sharks	33–22	Free State Cheetahs	Kings Park Stadium, Durban
17:00	Try: Patrick Lambie 38'; Jacques Botes 51'; Heimar Williams 67'; Con: Patrick Lambie 39', 52', 68' (3/3); Pen: Patrick Lambie 7', 31', 40', 63' (4/5); Cards: Bismarck du Plessis (yellow card) 65' to 76'	Scoreboard; Report	Try: Lappies Labuschagné 3'; Johann Sadie 65'; Schalk van der Merwe 74'; Con: Riaan Smit 4' (1/1); Johan Goosen 66' (1/2); Pen: Riaan Smit (0/1); Johan Goosen 47' (1/1); Cards: Piet van Zyl (yellow card) 58' to 68'	Attendance: 19,124; Referee: Marius van der Westhuizen

==== Final ====
26 October 2013	Western Province	19–33	Sharks	Newlands Stadium, Cape Town
17:30	Try: Damian de Allende 9'; Con: Demetri Catrakilis 10' (1/1); Pen: Demetri Catrakilis 26', 34', 43' (3/3); Kurt Coleman 55' (1/1)	Scoreboard; Report	Try: Charl McLeod 5', 57'; Con: Patrick Lambie 6' (1/2); Pen: Patrick Lambie 3', 22', 40', 45', 79' (5/8); Drop: Patrick Lambie 27', 52' (2/3); François Steyn (0/1)	Attendance: 48,876; Referee: Jonathan Kaplan

2013 Absa Currie Cup
Premier Division Champions
Sharks
7th title

== Promotion/relegation games ==
=== Log ===
2013 Currie Cup promotion/relegation games
Pos	Team	Pld	W	D	L	PF	PA	PD	TF	TA	TB	LB	Pts	Promotion or relegation
1	Pumas (P)	2	1	0	1	52	36	+16	4	3	0	1	5	2014 Currie Cup Premier Division
2	Griquas (R)	2	1	0	1	36	52	−16	3	4	0	0	4	2014 Currie Cup First Division

Rules for classification: 4 points for a win; 2 points for a draw; 1 bonus point for a loss by seven points or less; 1 bonus point for scoring four or more tries in a match
(P) Promoted; (R) Relegated

=== Results ===
18 October 2013	Griquas	21–19	Pumas	Griqua Park, Kimberley
19:10	Try: Carel Greeff 56' c Jean Stemmet 61' c Marnus Schoeman 79' c Con: Gouws Prinsloo (3/3) 57', 62', 80'	Scoreboard	Try: Wilmaure Louw 22' c Con: Carl Bezuidenhout (1/1) 22'; Pen: Carl Bezuidenhout (2/2) 3', 10'; JC Roos (2/2) 65', 73'; Cards: Giant Mtyanda (yellow card) 79'	Referee: Jonathan Kaplan

25 October 2013	Pumas	33–15	Griquas	Mbombela Stadium, Mbombela
19:10	Try: Stefan Watermeyer 4' c penalty try 51' c Roscko Speckman 77' c Con: JC Roos (3/3) 5', 52', 78'; Pen: JC Roos (3/5) 18', 22', 71'; Drop: JC Roos (1/1) 37'; Cards: Renaldo Bothma (yellow card) 23' to 34'	Scoreboard	Pen: Gouws Prinsloo (5/6) 3', 13', 24', 34', 66'; Cards: Jean Stemmet (yellow card) 51' to 62'	Referee: Craig Joubert

== Players ==
=== Player statistics ===
The following table contain only points which have been scored in competitive games in the 2013 Currie Cup Premier Division.

All point scorers
No	Player	Team	T	C	P	DG	Pts
1	Marnitz Boshoff	Golden Lions	2	20	14	0	92
2	Fred Zeilinga	Sharks	1	13	17	3	91
3	Kurt Coleman	Western Province	0	9	21	0	81
4	Riaan Smit	Free State Cheetahs	2	12	12	0	70
5	Demetri Catrakilis	Western Province	1	5	16	2	69
6	Elton Jantjies	Golden Lions	2	11	11	0	65
7	Elgar Watts	Free State Cheetahs	4	8	9	0	63
8	Handré Pollard	Blue Bulls	0	10	13	1	62
9	Nico Scheepers	Griquas	1	5	12	0	51
10	Patrick Lambie	Sharks	1	5	9	2	48
11	Butch James	Sharks	0	5	11	0	43
12	Francois Brummer	Griquas	0	4	10	0	38
13	Gouws Prinsloo	Griquas	0	5	9	0	37
14	Raymond Rhule	Free State Cheetahs	7	0	0	0	35
15	Derick Minnie	Golden Lions	6	0	0	0	30
15	Anthony Volmink	Golden Lions	6	0	0	0	30
17	Tony Jantjies	Blue Bulls	0	4	7	0	29
18	Jaco Kriel	Golden Lions	5	0	0	0	25
19	Jurgen Visser	Blue Bulls	2	1	4	0	24
20	Gary van Aswegen	Western Province	0	5	4	0	22
21	Gio Aplon	Western Province	4	0	0	0	20
21	Jacques Botes	Sharks	4	0	0	0	20
21	Damian de Allende	Western Province	4	0	0	0	20
21	Deon Fourie	Western Province	4	0	0	0	20
21	SP Marais	Sharks	4	0	0	0	20
21	Lwazi Mvovo	Sharks	4	0	0	0	20
21	Francois Venter	Blue Bulls	4	0	0	0	20
21	Heimar Williams	Sharks	4	0	0	0	20
29	Willie Britz	Golden Lions	3	0	0	0	15
29	Cheslin Kolbe	Western Province	3	0	0	0	15
29	Charl McLeod	Sharks	3	0	0	0	15
29	Sarel Pretorius	Free State Cheetahs	3	0	0	0	15
29	Boom Prinsloo	Free State Cheetahs	3	0	0	0	15
29	Michael Rhodes	Western Province	3	0	0	0	15
29	Johann Sadie	Free State Cheetahs	3	0	0	0	15
29	Paul Willemse	Blue Bulls	3	0	0	0	15
37	Rory Arnold	Griquas	2	0	0	0	10
37	Bjorn Basson	Blue Bulls	2	0	0	0	10
37	Andries Coetzee	Golden Lions	2	0	0	0	10
37	Keegan Daniel	Sharks	2	0	0	0	10
37	Hennie Daniller	Free State Cheetahs	2	0	0	0	10
37	Juan de Jongh	Western Province	2	0	0	0	10
37	Ruan Dreyer	Golden Lions	2	0	0	0	10
37	Robert Ebersohn	Free State Cheetahs	2	0	0	0	10
37	Carel Greeff	Griquas	2	0	0	0	10
37	Deon Helberg	Golden Lions	2	0	0	0	10
37	Rocco Jansen	Griquas	2	0	0	0	10
37	Lappies Labuschagné	Free State Cheetahs	2	0	0	0	10
37	Wiaan Liebenberg	Blue Bulls	2	0	0	0	10
37	Akona Ndungane	Blue Bulls	2	0	0	0	10
37	Cobus Reinach	Sharks	2	0	0	0	10
37	Marnus Schoeman	Griquas	2	0	0	0	10
37	William Small-Smith	Blue Bulls	2	0	0	0	10
37	Schalk van der Merwe	Free State Cheetahs	2	0	0	0	10
37	Jacques van Rooyen	Golden Lions	2	0	0	0	10
37	PJ Vermeulen	Griquas	2	0	0	0	10
37	Warren Whiteley	Golden Lions	2	0	0	0	10
58	Willie du Plessis	Free State Cheetahs	0	3	0	0	6
59	David Bulbring	Blue Bulls	1	0	0	0	5
59	Nizaam Carr	Western Province	1	0	0	0	5
59	Robbie Coetzee	Golden Lions	1	0	0	0	5
59	Jean Cook	Blue Bulls	1	0	0	0	5
59	Kyle Cooper	Sharks	1	0	0	0	5
59	Dalton Davis	Griquas	1	0	0	0	5
59	Jean Deysel	Sharks	1	0	0	0	5
59	Jacques du Plessis	Blue Bulls	1	0	0	0	5
59	Johan Goosen	Free State Cheetahs	0	1	1	0	5
59	Nic Groom	Western Province	1	0	0	0	5
59	Stokkies Hanekom	Golden Lions	1	0	0	0	5
59	Wiehahn Herbst	Sharks	1	0	0	0	5
59	Patrick Howard	Western Province	1	0	0	0	5
59	Travis Ismaiel	Blue Bulls	1	0	0	0	5
59	AJ le Roux	Free State Cheetahs	1	0	0	0	5
59	Tiaan Liebenberg	Western Province	1	0	0	0	5
59	Louis Ludik	Sharks	1	0	0	0	5
59	Kevin Luiters	Free State Cheetahs	1	0	0	0	5
59	Sizo Maseko	Sharks	1	0	0	0	5
59	Howard Mnisi	Griquas	1	0	0	0	5
59	Ruhan Nel	Golden Lions	1	0	0	0	5
59	Jaco Nepgen	Griquas	1	0	0	0	5
59	Rudy Paige	Blue Bulls	1	0	0	0	5
59	Jono Ross	Blue Bulls	1	0	0	0	5
59	Burger Schoeman	Griquas	1	0	0	0	5
59	Brynard Stander	Sharks	1	0	0	0	5
59	Jean Stemmet	Griquas	1	0	0	0	5
59	Adriaan Strauss	Free State Cheetahs	1	0	0	0	5
59	Warwick Tecklenburg	Golden Lions	1	0	0	0	5
59	Gerhard van den Heever	Western Province	1	0	0	0	5
59	Franco van der Merwe	Golden Lions	1	0	0	0	5
59	Marcel van der Merwe	Blue Bulls	1	0	0	0	5
59	Piet van Zyl	Free State Cheetahs	1	0	0	0	5
59	Marco Wentzel	Sharks	1	0	0	0	5
59	Willie Wepener	Golden Lions	1	0	0	0	5
59	Tim Whitehead	Sharks	1	0	0	0	5
95	DuRandt Gerber	Griquas	0	1	0	0	2
96	penalty try	—	2	0	0	0	10
* Legend: T = Tries, C = Conversions, P = Penalties, DG = Drop Goals, Pts = Points

== Awards ==
Month	Coach of the Month	Team	Player of the Month	Team
August	Brendan Venter, Sean Everett, Brad McLeod-Henderson	Sharks	Cheslin Kolbe	Western Province
September	Allister Coetzee	Western Province	Scarra Ntubeni	Western Province
October	Allister Coetzee	Western Province	Damian de Allende	Western Province

== See also ==
- 2013 Currie Cup First Division
- 2013 Vodacom Cup
- 2013 Under-21 Provincial Championship
- 2013 Under-19 Provincial Championship
