= Elgar Watts =

South African rugby union player

- Full name: Elgar Graeme Watts
- Born: 24 September 1985 (age 41) Paarl, South Africa
- Height: 1.81 m (5 ft 11 1/2 in)
- Weight: 87 kg (192 lb; 13 st 10 lb)
- School: Klein Nederburg, Paarl
- University: Boland College, Paarl

Rugby union career
- Position: Fly-half
Amateur team(s)
Years	Team	Apps	(Points)
2006	Maties		
Senior career
Years	Team	Apps	(Points)
2008–2009	Boland Cavaliers	39	(84)
2010	Pumas	22	(111)
2011–2012	Boland Cavaliers	36	(361)
2013	Free State XV	2	(9)
2013–2015	Free State Cheetahs	13	(75)
2013–2015	Cheetahs	19	(87)
2015	→ Griffons	1	(12)
2015	Eastern Province Kings	6	(5)
2016	Southern Kings	11	(31)
2016	Griquas	8	(10)
2017–2018	Boland Cavaliers	24	(131)
- Correct as of 27 October 2018
International career
Years	Team	Apps	(Points)
2012	South African Barbarians (South)	1	(6)
- Correct as of 7 April 2016

Elgar Graeme Watts (born 24 September 1985) is a South African professional rugby union player who played for the Boland Cavaliers, Pumas, Free State Cheetahs and Griquas domestically and for the Cheetahs and the Southern Kings in Super Rugby. His usual position is fly-half.

== Career ==
=== Maties ===
Watts started his career playing rugby for University of Stellenbosch side Maties, representing them at the 2006 National Club Championships held in Stellenbosch.

=== Boland Cavaliers ===
Watts made his first class debut in 2008 for Wellington-based side Boland Cavaliers, coming on as a replacement in their first match in the 2008 Vodacom Cup against the Falcons. Just a quarter of an hour into his debut, he scored his first points for the Cavaliers, kicking a drop goal in the 78th minute to help his side to a 31–22 victory. He also played off the bench in their second match of the campaign, a 29–25 victory over the Leopards in Potchefstroom before making his first start for his side in a 45–7 win over the Pumas, kicking five conversions in that match. He also started their remaining four matches in the round-robin stage of the competition, scoring a further 12 points to help the Cavaliers finish in third spot on the Southern Section log to qualify for a quarter final match away to the Free State Cheetahs. He started that match as fly-half, but could not prevent Free State running out 35–20 winners to eliminate Boland from the competition.

Watts made his Currie Cup debut two months later, starting the Boland Cavaliers' first match of the 2008 Currie Cup Premier Division, a 48–42 win over the Falcons in Brakpan. He started 11 of their 14 matches during the season and played off the bench in a further two matches. He scored his first senior try in their Round Four match against the Golden Lions in a 17–57 defeat and also converting his own try. He scored further tries against the Blue Bulls, the Golden Lions and the Free State Cheetahs to help the Cavaliers finish seventh (and second-last) on the log. This meant that they had to play in a relegation play-off match against the side that finished second on the 2008 Currie Cup First Division log, Welkom-based side the Griffons. Watts scored four tries and kicked one conversion in the first leg of the play-off to set up a 54–15 win for the side from Wellington; they remained in the Premier Division for 2009 despite a 42–50 loss in the second leg of the play-off.

Watts didn't feature in the 2009 Vodacom Cup competition, but returned to action for Boland in the 2009 Currie Cup Premier Division. He started 13 of their 14 matches and came on as a replacement in their final match of the season against the Free State Cheetahs. He contributed 13 points during the season with the boot as the Cavaliers had a very disappointing season, finishing last on the log with just one victory all season, a 26–18 defeat of the Leopards on the opening day of the season. This meant they had to participate in another relegation play-off, this time against the Pumas. Despite winning the first leg 36–35, they lost the second leg 3–40 in Witbank to be relegated to the First Division for 2010.

=== Pumas ===
Watts remained in the Premier Division of the Currie Cup, as he joined the team that replaced the Boland Cavaliers in that division, Witbank-based outfit the Pumas. He started the Pumas' first two matches of the 2010 Vodacom Cup competition, a 52–17 win over the Falcons and a 15–29 defeat to the Blue Bulls. He was used as a replacement for the remainder of the competition, playing off the bench on four occasions as the Pumas finished fifth on the log to miss out on a quarter final spot.

However, Watts was very much a key player in their 2010 Currie Cup Premier Division campaign; he featured in all fourteen of their matches, starting eleven of those. He came on as a late replacement in their Round One 15–38 defeat to the Blue Bulls, but started their second match against the Leopards – he contributed 27 points in this match, scoring a hat-trick of tries, three conversions and two penalties in a 37–32 victory. Over the course of the season, he helped them to further victories against the Blue Bulls, the return match against the Leopards and the Golden Lions as the Pumas finished seventh in the competition. Watts finished the season as the top scorer for the Pumas with 104 points, which consisted of nine tries, 16 conversions and nine penalties. He scored a try and a conversion against the Eastern Province Kings in a 36–36 draw in the first leg of their relegation play-off match and also started the second leg, where a 46–28 victory for the Pumas ensured they remained in the Currie Cup Premier Division in 2011.

=== Return to Boland Cavaliers ===
Watts returned to Wellington for 2011 to rejoin the Boland Cavaliers. He was included in the 2011 Stormers Super Rugby squad, but failed to make an appearance. Instead, he started all seven of the Boland Cavaliers' matches in the 2011 Vodacom Cup competition. He scored tries against Namibian side Welwitschias and against the Falcons as the Boland Cavaliers finished sixth on the log, three log points off a quarter final spot.

After playing in a compulsory friendly match against Western Cape rivals Western Province in June 2011, he featured in the most high-scoring season of his career; he scored 185 points in twelve appearances in the 2011 Currie Cup First Division to finish as the top scorer in the competition. He set the tone in their opening match, kicking nine conversions and two penalties in a 69–12 victory over the Border Bulldogs. His best personal haul came in their 47–29 win over the Griffons, scoring a try, five conversions and four penalties for a personal tally of 27 points. The Boland Cavaliers won nine of their ten matches during the regular season – the only defeat being a 17–23 loss to the Eastern Province Kings – to finish top of the log and secure a home semi-final against the Griffons. Watts scored a try, six conversions and a penalty in a 50–20 win and also contributed 12 points in the final, a 43–12 victory over the Eastern Province Kings to help them win the First Division title for the second time in their history. Due to the Premier Division being reduced from eight teams to six for 2012, there was no possibility of promotion to that league.

Watts scored 49 points in his seven appearances – all with the boot – during the 2012 Vodacom Cup competition, again just missing out on the play-offs by finishing fifth, with Argentine side Pampas XV edging them out on points differential after they finished level on 21 log points.

In June 2012, he was also named as the starting fly-half for a South African Barbarians (South) team that played against England during their 2012 tour of South Africa. Watts kicked three conversions in a 26–54 defeat in Kimberley.

Watts started nine of the Boland Cavaliers' fourteen matches during the season, with a thigh injury ruling him out of five matches. He still finished the season as his side's top scorer with 115 points, sixth overall in the competition. It turned out to be a disappointing season for the defending champions as they finished in sixth spot in the competition to miss out on the play-off altogether.

Watts left Boland Cavaliers at the end of the 2012 season, having scored 445 points in 75 matches in his two separate spells in Wellington, making him the fifth-highest points scorer in the team's history.

=== Free State Cheetahs / Cheetahs ===
Watts made the move to Bloemfontein to join the Cheetahs prior to the 2013 Super Rugby season. He was named on the bench for their first match of the season against the Sharks, but was an unused replacement in their 22–29 defeat, before dropping out of their matchday squads altogether, with Johan Goosen, Burton Francis and Riaan Smit ahead of him in the pecking order. He made two appearances for a Free State XV in the 2013 Vodacom Cup, starting in their 26–25 victory over the Border Bulldogs in Alice and their 32–38 defeat to the Pampas XV in Stellenbosch. He was again named on the bench for the Cheetahs in their Round Eleven Super Rugby match against the Southern Kings and he made his Super Rugby debut by coming on as a second-half replacement. After another appearance off the bench against the Hurricanes which saw him score his first Super Rugby points by kicking two conversions and a penalty in a 34–39 defeat, Watts was elevated to the starting line-up for their match against the Reds and contributed 17 points (through five penalties and a conversion) in a 27–13 victory. He contributed 14 points in his side's 34–22 victory over the Southern Kings in his second start a week later, but reverted to the bench for the remainder of the competition, making appearances against the Stormers and the Blues to help the Cheetahs qualify for the play-off stage of the competition for the first time in their history. He was an unused replacement in their 13–15 defeat to the Brumbies in Canberra in the qualifier.

Watts was the undisputed first choice fly-half for the Free State Cheetahs in the 2013 Currie Cup Premier Division, starting all eleven of their matches during the competition. He shared the kicking duties with right winger Riaan Smit, contributing 63 points which included four tries to finish as the Cheetahs' second-highest scorer behind Smit who scored 70. The Free State Cheetahs finished the season in third spot on the log to qualify for the semi-finals, but lost at that stage of the competition against eventual champions the Sharks, going down 22–33 in a match in Durban.

Watts moved up the pecking order for the 2014 Super Rugby season, being named the regular replacement for first-choice fly-half Johan Goosen. Watts started three matches against the Sharks, Stormers and Bulls and played off the bench on ten occasions. In total, he contributed 49 points – the second-highest by a Cheetahs player behind Goosen – which also included his first Super Rugby try in a match against the Reds in a 33–43 defeat in Brisbane. In July 2014, he was rewarded with a contract extension, committing him to the Cheetahs until 2016.

However, he made just two appearances in the 2014 Currie Cup Premier Division – against the Pumas in Nelspruit and Griquas in Bloemfontein – before suffering a knee injury which ruled him out of the remainder of the campaign and the entire 2015 Super Rugby season.

=== Griffons ===
Upon returning to fitness, he was loaned to the Griffons and he made one appearance for the Welkom-based side, scoring 12 points consisting of a try, two conversions and a penalty in a 25–21 victory over the SWD Eagles in the 2015 Currie Cup qualification competition.

=== Eastern Province Kings ===
In June 2015, he was released from his contract with the Free State Cheetahs to join the Port Elizabeth-based Eastern Province Kings prior to the 2015 Currie Cup Premier Division, signing a deal until October 2017.
