= Kurt Coleman (rugby union) =

South African rugby union player

- Full name: Kurt Kendall Coleman
- Born: 29 January 1990 (age 36) Knysna
- Height: 1.77 m (5 ft 9 1/2 in)
- Weight: 82 kg (181 lb; 12 st 13 lb)
- School: Grey High School
- University: University of Stellenbosch

Rugby union career
- Position: Fly-half
- Current team: Rugby ATL
Youth career
- 2008: Eastern Province Kings
- 2009–2011: Western Province
Senior career
Years	Team	Apps	(Points)
2011–2017	Western Province	68	(359)
2011–2017	Stormers	42	(171)
2012	→ SWD Eagles	4	(35)
2017–2018	Southern Kings	8	(39)
2019–2023	Rugby ATL	34	(174)
- Correct as of 2 April 2026

Kurt Kendall Coleman is a South African rugby union player who currently plays fly-half for Rugby ATL in Major League Rugby (MLR).

He previously played for the Southern Kings in the Pro14.

== Professional career ==
He represented the Eastern Province Kings in the 2008 Craven Week, which earned him a move to Western Province. After playing for them in the Under-19 and Under-21 Currie Cup competitions, he was included in their 2011 Vodacom Cup squad, making his debut against the Golden Lions on the opening weekend.

After eight appearances in that competition, he was called up into the Stormers squad for the 2011 Super Rugby season. He made his Stormers debut on 30 April 2011 against the Sharks, coming on as a substitute in the 70th minute and scoring a penalty 4 minutes later. He made a further four appearances for the Stormers, including three starts.

He failed to break into the Stormers team for the 2012 Super Rugby season, instead representing Western Province in the Vodacom Cup, where he scored 44 points in 10 games.

After a short spell on loan at the SWD Eagles, he returned to Western Province for the 2012 Currie Cup Premier Division.

He also played for Maties in the 2011 Varsity Cup.

In December 2019 Rugby ATL of Major League Rugby announced that Coleman had signed to play with them for the 2020 season.

== Super Rugby Statistics ==
As of 21 June 2015

Season	Team	Games	Starts	Sub	Mins	Tries	Cons	Pens	Drops	Points	Yel	Red
2011	Stormers	5	3	2	212	1	4	6	0	31	0	0
2012	Stormers	0	0	0	0	0	0	0	0	0	0	0
2013	Stormers	1	0	1	5	0	0	0	0	0	0	0
2014	Stormers	9	6	3	421	1	8	10	0	51	0	0
2015	Stormers	15	2	13	425	0	9	12	1	57	0	0
Total		30	11	19	1063	2	21	28	1	139	0	0
