= Craig Joubert =

South African rugby union referee (born 1977)

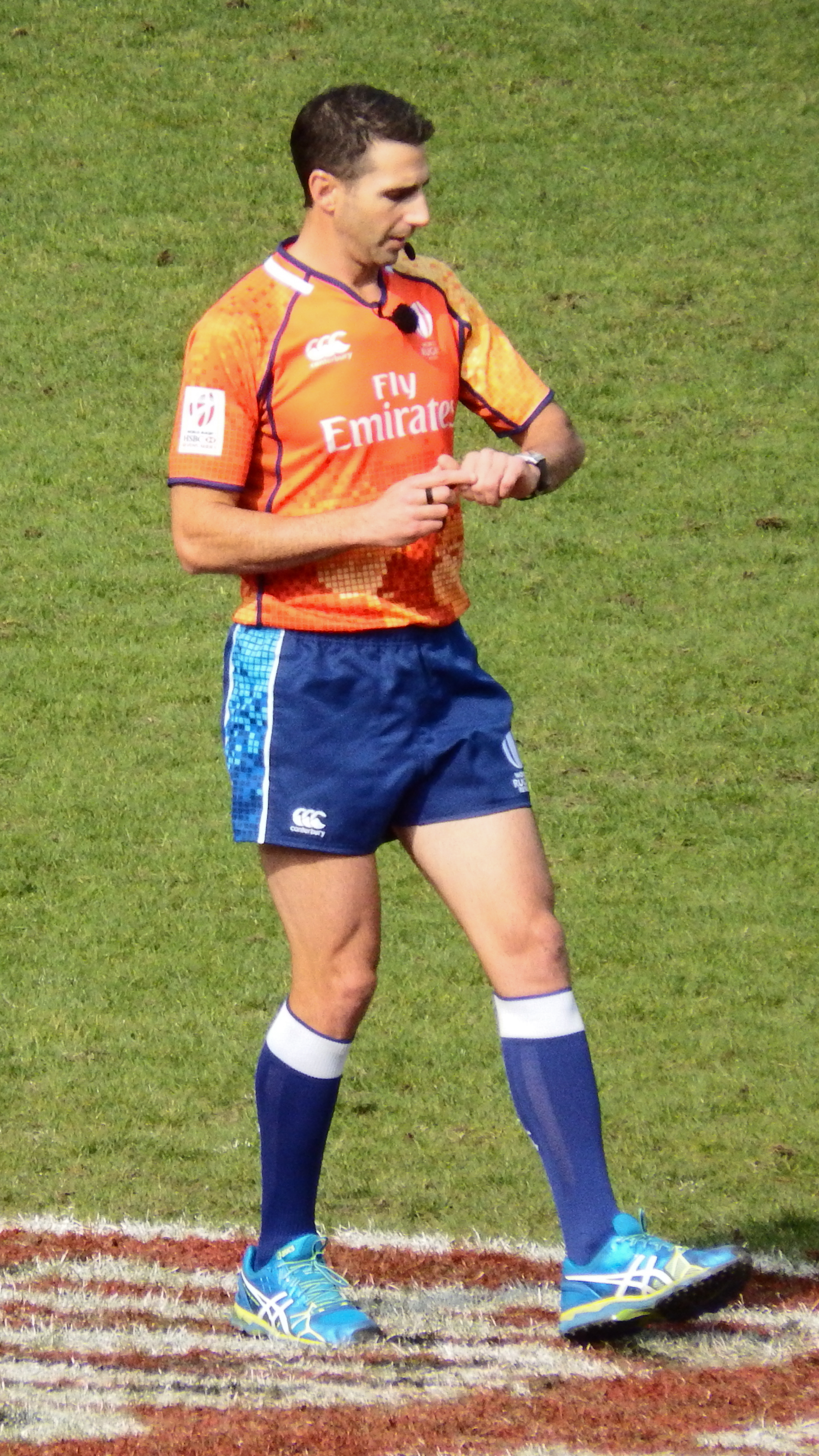
- Joubert in 2016
- Born: Craig Paul Joubert; 8 November 1977 (age 49) Durban, South Africa
- School: Maritzburg College
- University: University of Natal

Rugby union career
Refereeing career
Years	Competition	Apps
2011	2011 RWC final	1
2005–2016	Tests	69
2005–2016	Super Rugby	103
2003–2016	Currie Cup	80
2016–	World Sevens Series	
- Correct as of 7 December 2016

Craig Paul Joubert (born 8 November 1977) is a South African professional rugby union referee and a Referee Talent Development Coach at World Rugby.

Joubert officiated in domestic first class matches in South Africa since 2003, in matches in the Vodacom Cup and Currie Cup competitions. He refereed on the World Rugby Sevens circuit in 2003–04. He has been included in the Super Rugby refereeing panel since 2005 and has also refereed international test matches since 2005, making his debut in a match between the United States and Wales.

Joubert took charge of Super Rugby finals in 2010, 2013 and 2014 and has officiated in Tri-Nations / Rugby Championship matches since 2009, refereeing matches between Australia and New Zealand in 2009, 2010, 2011 and 2013. In the 2011 Rugby World Cup, Joubert refereed four pool games, a quarter-final, a semi-final and the final. He refereed the deciding Six Nations match in 2012 and one of the British & Irish Lions games on their tour to Australia in 2013.

He took part in four pool games at the 2015 Rugby World Cup and the quarter-final match between Scotland and Australia. During that quarter-final, he was criticised for incorrectly awarding a penalty to Australia in the final minutes of the match and for rushing off the field at the end of the match.

He retired from refereeing 15-a-side matches at the end of 2016 to take up a role as a Referee Talent Development Coach at World Rugby.

== Early career ==
Joubert was born in 1977 and attended Maritzburg College and then the University of Natal to study business finance. Joubert took up refereeing in 1995 as a teenager, when he was encouraged to do so by his father Des, who was also a referee at provincial level. He initially worked in corporate banking for a period of five years, before deciding to take up full-time refereeing, becoming a member of the Kwa-Zulu Natal Rugby Referees' Society.

== 2003–05 ==
In 2003, Joubert officiated in several first class matches in domestic South African competitions, appearing in the Vodacom Cup and Vodacom Shield at the start of the year before taking charge of matches in the Currie Cup qualifying rounds, the First Division and eventually in the Premier Division of the Currie Cup when he took charge of the match between the Griquas and the Pumas in Kimberley.

After the domestic season, Joubert joined the 2003–04 World Sevens Series circuit. He returned to domestic action for the 2004 Vodacom Cup and 2004 Currie Cup competitions and was named on the South African refereeing panel for the 2005 Super 12 season. He officiated at his first Super 12 match in Sydney when the New South Wales Waratahs beat the Chiefs 25–7 in the opening round of the competition. Two more appearances followed – again in Sydney as the Waratahs faced the Crusaders and in Dunedin where the Highlanders hosted the Waratahs.

He officiated his first test match in June 2005, when he took charge of a match between the United States and Wales in Connecticut, before again officiating in the South African domestic Currie Cup competition, where he refereed the First Division final between the Falcons and the Pumas.

== 2006–11 ==
He refereed a further five matches in the 2006 Super 14 season – which included his first appointment to a match played in South Africa in the trans-Jukskei derby between the Bulls and the Cats – and in domestic action in the 2006 Currie Cup Premier Division. He refereed in both those competitions throughout 2007 and 2008, and also took charge of the promotion/relegation play-off match between the Boland Cavaliers and the Griffons.

After taking charge of seven matches in the 2009 Super 14 season, he refereed the British & Irish Lions' match against the Golden Lions during their tour of South Africa. He took charge of both matches between New Zealand and Australia hosted in New Zealand in the 2009 Tri Nations Series, as well as the 2009 Currie Cup First Division final between the Pumas and the SWD Eagles.

In 2010, Joubert was in charge of several Super 14 matches including being appointed as the referee for the final between the Bulls and the Stormers in Soweto. He once again took charge of a match between Australia and New Zealand in the 2010 Tri Nations Series and was appointed to officiate the final of the 2010 Currie Cup Premier Division between the Sharks and Western Province in Durban.

He refereed several matches during the 2011 Super Rugby season, including the semi-final match between the Stormers and the Crusaders in Cape Town. He also had a further appearance in the 2011 Tri Nations Series, officiating the New Zealand versus Australia match in Auckland.

=== 2011 Rugby World Cup ===
He was named on the refereeing panel for the 2011 Rugby World Cup, and took charge of four matches during the pool stage of the competition. He also officiated the quarter-final match between Ireland and Wales, the semi-final between Australia and New Zealand and the final between New Zealand and France, in the process becoming the youngest referee ever to officiate a final. Joubert was publicly criticised by French players Dimitri Yachvili, Dimitri Szarzewski and Maxime Mermoz for his performance in the final and from sections of the French and international press, which considered his refereeing too lenient towards New Zealand. Gerry Thornley, writing in The Irish Times, was of the opinion that France was the better team on the night, with Joubert being reluctant to award penalties against New Zealand in the last quarter of the match. Sir Clive Woodward said ref robbed France of 2011 World Cup.

== 2012–15 ==
In 2012, Joubert took charge of the 2012 Six Nations Championship match – and Grand Slam decider – between Wales and France and was also involved in the very start of the 2015 Rugby World Cup qualifying tournament, as he officiated the first match between Mexico and Jamaica in the Americas qualification tournament.

He again officiated during the Super Rugby, including taking charge of the semi-final match between the Chiefs and the Crusaders. He made one appearance in the 2012 Rugby Championship in the Argentina versus Australia match in Rosario and took charge of the Currie Cup promotion/relegation play-off match between the Eastern Province Kings and the Free State Cheetahs.

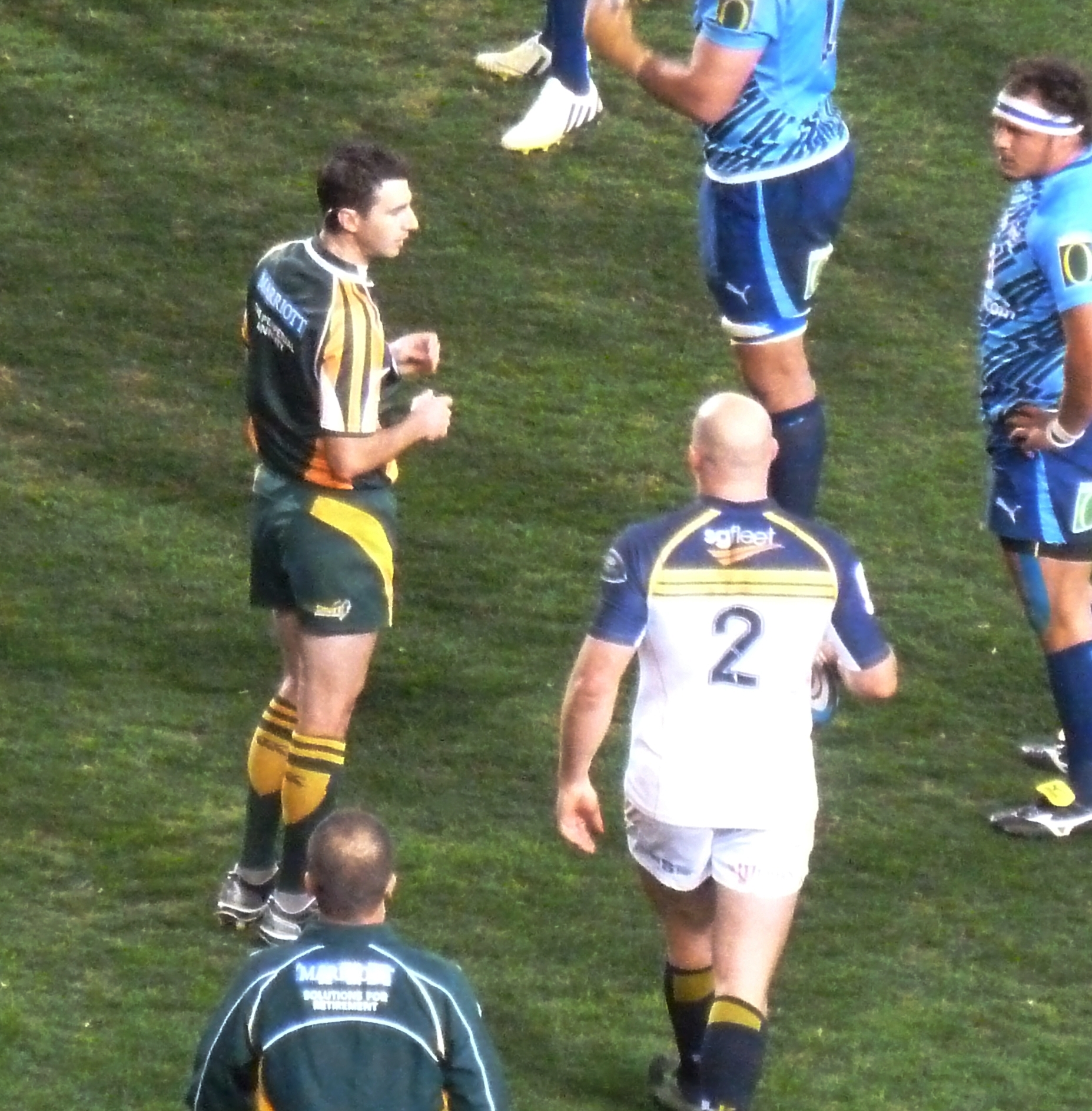
Craig Joubert refereeing the Brumbies vs Bulls 2013 Super Rugby semi-final.

After officiating in seven matches during the 2013 Super Rugby season, Joubert was put in charge of a match between Samoa and Italy in a quadrangular tournament held in South Africa and also the second test match between the British & Irish Lions and Australia during the 2013 tour series. When the Super Rugby season resumed after the international break, Joubert was appointed to referee the semi-final match between the Bulls and the Brumbies and also the final a week later, as the Chiefs hosted the Brumbies in Hamilton. He again took charge of an Australia versus New Zealand clash in the 2013 Rugby Championship and in domestic rugby in the 2013 Currie Cup Premier Division, as well as the Currie Cup promotion/relegation play-off match between the Pumas and the Griquas.

He officiated fifteen matches in the 2014 Super Rugby season, which included his second consecutive final as the Waratahs hosted the Crusaders in Sydney, where again he come under criticism for a late penalty he awarded in favour of the Waratahs giving them the win. The following day Joubert contacted both Crusaders Coach Todd Blackadder and Crusaders Captain Richie McCaw to apologise, announcing to both that he got the final call wrong. Joubert officiated the Argentina versus New Zealand match in the 2014 Rugby Championship in La Plata. He refereed several matches in the 2014 Currie Cup Premier Division, including the final between Western Province and the Golden Lions.

At the conclusion of the 2015 Super Rugby season, World Rugby announced that Joubert would return to the World Sevens Series for 2015–16, in an attempt to earn a selection to officiate at the rugby sevens event at the 2016 Summer Olympics in Rio de Janeiro.

=== 2015 Rugby World Cup ===
He was named on the refereeing panel of the 2015 Rugby World Cup and took charge of four matches during the pool stage of the tournament. He was also appointed to officiate the quarter-final between Australia and Scotland, which Australia won 35–34. During the game Joubert awarded a last minute penalty to Australia, which they slotted to win the match. This was criticised by Scotland supporters, as well as former players like Andy Nicol and Matt Dawson, after replays showed that Joubert had awarded the penalty erroneously. Scotland wanted Joubert to refer the incident to the television match official (TMO); but he was prevented from doing so by TMO protocol, so had to judge the incident in real time. Joubert ended the game and immediately ran to the tunnel without shaking hands with any players or his team of officials. Following a review of the referee's performance, World Rugby stated that Joubert should not have awarded the penalty. However, this public review of Joubert's performance also attracted criticism from figures within the game, such as Australia coach Michael Cheika and former player David Campese. In addition, Joubert was also criticised by former Scottish captain Gavin Hastings and former Scotland winger Kenny Logan for rushing from the field immediately after the match ended, rather than shaking hands with the players and fellow officials, as is tradition. Cheika said afterwards that Joubert was correct to run off the field as spectators were throwing bottles onto the pitch.

== 2016 ==
After his spell officiating in the 2015–16 World Rugby Sevens Series, Joubert was included on the list of referees that would take charge in the Rugby sevens at the 2016 Summer Olympics. He also remained active in the fifteen-man version of the sport, officiating in the 2016 Super Rugby season. In May 2016, he was appointed to officiate the Bulls versus Lions match, his 100th appearance in the competition.

He retired from refereeing 15-a-side matches at the end of 2016 to take up a role as a Referee Talent Development Coach at World Rugby. While the job would mainly consist of developing younger referees, he would continue to referee on the World Rugby Sevens Series.
