= Jannie Boshoff =

South African rugby union footballer

- Born: Jan Hendrik Boshoff; 13 January 1986 (age 40) Newcastle, South Africa
- Height: 1.78 m (5 ft 10 in)
- Weight: 87 kg (13 st 10 lb)
- School: Maritzburg College

Rugby union career
- Position: Centre / Wing
Provincial / State sides
Years	Team	Apps	(Points)
2007–2011	Golden Lions	43	(70)
2012–present	Griquas	13	(30)
- Correct as of 13 May 2013
Super Rugby
Years	Team	Apps	(Points)
2007–2011	Lions	24	(15)
- Correct as of 15 April 2012

Jannie Boshoff (born 13 January 1986) is a South African rugby union footballer. His regular playing position is either as a winger or a centre. Although contracted to the Lions, he joined Griquas on loan for the 2012 Vodacom Cup and 2012 Currie Cup Premier Division campaigns.
