= Scarra Ntubeni =

South Africa international rugby union player

- Full name: Siyabonga Ntubeni
- Born: 18 February 1991 (age 35) East London, South Africa
- Height: 1.74 m (5 ft 8 1/2 in)
- Weight: 105 kg (16 st 7 lb; 231 lb)
- School: King Edward VII School

Rugby union career
- Position: Hooker
- Current team: Stormers / Western Province
Youth career
- 2006: Border
- 2008–2009: Golden Lions
- 2010–2012: Western Province
Senior career
Years	Team	Apps	(Points)
2011–2026	Western Province	78	(45)
2011–2026	Stormers	105	(30)
- Correct as of 23 July 2022
International career
Years	Team	Apps	(Points)
2009	South African Schools		
2016	South Africa 'A'	1	(0)
2019	South Africa	1	(0)
- Correct as of 21 August 2019

Siyabonga 'Scarra' Ntubeni (born 18 February 1991) is a South African rugby union who plays as hooker for the Stormers in Super Rugby and Western Province in the Currie Cup and in the Rugby Challenge.

== Career ==
Ntubeni debuted for both Western Province and the Stormers in 2011, however it wasn't until the 2012 Currie Cup that he really established himself as a first team member. He featured in all of Province's 12 games during that campaign and was instrumental as his side lifted the Currie Cup for the 33rd time. Ntubeni was a starter as Western Province triumphed 25–19 over the Sharks in Durban.

2013 got off to a slow start as injury ruled him out of the first half of the Stormers season, but he did return for the final 8 games and this coincided with an upturn in his sides fortunes following a lacklustre first half of the season. He again made a big impact in the 2013 Currie Cup, taking advantage of Tiaan Liebenberg's injury and skipper Deon Fourie's switch to the flank to again be an ever present member of the side. He started 11 games and made 1 substitute appearance as Province reached the Currie Cup Final for the second year in succession, this time going down 33–19 to the Sharks in Cape Town.

== International rugby ==
On 28 October 2013, SARU announced that Ntubeni was included in the 30-man squad for South Africa's 2013 end-of-year rugby union tests against France, Scotland and Wales in November 2013; however, he did not play in any of the matches.

On 28 May 2016, Ntubeni was included in a 31-man South Africa squad for their three-test match series against a touring Ireland team. After training with the national team for a few days, he joined the South Africa 'A' squad for their two-match series against a touring England Saxons team. He was named in the starting line-up for their first match in Bloemfontein, but ended on the losing side as the visitors ran out 32–24 winners.

== Super Rugby statistics ==
As of 9 June 2020

Season	Team	Games	Starts	Sub	Mins	Tries	Points	Yellow card	Red card
2011	Stormers	1	0	1	24	0	0	0	0
2012	Stormers	2	0	2	13	0	0	0	0
2013	Stormers	8	4	4	291	0	0	0	0
2014	Stormers	5	5	0	301	1	5	1	0
2015	Stormers	15	9	6	638	0	0	0	0
2016	Stormers	14	4	10	445	3	15	0	0
2017	Did not participate in Super Rugby								
2018	Stormers	7	0	7	82	0	0	0	0
2019	Stormers	15	5	10	525	0	0	0	0
2020	Stormers	6	5	1	388	0	0	0	0
Total		71	31	40	2631	4	20	1	0
