= Morné Mellett =

South African rugby union player

- Full name: Morné Melvin Mellett
- Born: 2 October 1989 (age 37) Boksburg, South Africa
- Height: 1.85 m (6 ft 1 in)
- Weight: 115 kg (18 st 2 lb; 254 lb)
- School: Dr E.G. Jansen

Rugby union career
- Position: Loosehead Prop
Youth career
- 2006–2007: Falcons
- 2007–2010: Blue Bulls
Amateur team(s)
Years	Team	Apps	(Points)
2010–2011	UP Tuks	4	(0)
Senior career
Years	Team	Apps	(Points)
2010–2014	Blue Bulls	26	(10)
2013–2015	Bulls	36	(0)
2010–2015	Total	62	(10)
- Correct as of 13 June 2015
International career
Years	Team	Apps	(Points)
2009	South Africa Under-20	5	(0)
- Correct as of 24 September 2012

Morné Melvin Mellett is a former South African rugby union player, that played with the Blue Bulls provincial team between 2010 and 2014 and with the Bulls Super Rugby team between 2013 and 2015. His usual position is prop.

== Career ==
After representing the Falcons at several youth tournaments, he joined the Blue Bulls in 2010.

He made his first team debut for the Blue Bulls in the 2010 Vodacom Cup, coming on as a substitute in their game against his former team, the Falcons. He made several appearances in this competition over the next three seasons and finally made his Currie Cup debut in the 2012 Currie Cup Premier Division against the Free State Cheetahs.

He also played for UP Tuks in the 2010 and 2011 Varsity Cup competitions.

He retired in December 2015, aged just 26, on medical advice after he suffered a vertebral artery dissection earlier in the year.
