= Rudy Paige =

South African rugby union player

- Born: 2 August 1989 (age 37) Heidelberg, Western Cape
- Height: 1.69 m (5 ft 6 1/2 in)
- Weight: 77 kg (170 lb; 12 st 2 lb)
- School: Bastion High School
- University: University of Johannesburg

Rugby union career
- Position: Scrum-half
Youth career
- 2001–2006: SWD Eagles
- 2007–2010: Golden Lions
Amateur team(s)
Years	Team	Apps	(Points)
2011–2012	UJ	12	(10)
Senior career
Years	Team	Apps	(Points)
2010–2012	Golden Lions XV	10	(0)
2011	Golden Lions	2	(0)
2012–2016	Blue Bulls	36	(10)
2013–2017	Bulls	48	(5)
2018	Free State XV	9	(0)
2018	Free State Cheetahs	6	(10)
2018–2019	Cheetahs	10	(0)
2019	Sunwolves	5	(0)
2019-2021	Clermont	6	(0)
2021-2022	Vannes	18	(5)
- Correct as of 21 July 2019
International career
Years	Team	Apps	(Points)
2007	South Africa Schools		
2009	South Africa Under-20	4	(0)
2012	South Africa Students	2	(0)
2015–2017	South Africa	13	(5)
2016	Springbok XV	1	(0)
- Correct as of 13 April 2018
Medal record
Men's Rugby union
Representing South Africa
Rugby World Cup
Bronze medal – third place	2015 England	Squad

Rudy Paige (born 2 August 1989) is a South African retired rugby union player. His usual position was scrum-half.

== Career ==
=== Youth level ===
Paige played for SWD Eagles at various youth tournaments, but moved to the Golden Lions in 2007.

=== Golden Lions ===
Paige was included in a senior squad for the first time when he was named in the 2010 Vodacom Cup squad. He made his debut for the Golden Lions in that competition against the Blue Bulls. His first start came a few weeks later in the same competition against the Welwitschias.

=== Blue Bulls ===
After just 12 appearances for the Golden Lions, Paige joined the Blue Bulls at the start of the 2012 Currie Cup Premier Division season. In March 2018 the Bulls announced they would be parting ways with Paige after being left out of the teams Super Rugby squad for the 2018 season.

=== Cheetahs ===
The Cheetahs signed a three-month contract with Paige where he would play for the remainder of the Cheetahs 2017-18 Pro14 season.

=== Clermont Auvergne ===
Paige joined French Top 14 side Clermont in 2019.

=== Other ===
Paige was captain of the S.A. schools side in 2007 and took part in the 2009 IRB Junior World Championship for the South Africa U20 team.

Paige also played Varsity Cup rugby for UJ in 2011 and 2012.

Paige also made his national team debut in the second half of South Africa's 64–0 victory over the US in the pool stages of the 2015 Rugby World Cup.
