= Jacques Botes =

South African rugby union player

- Full name: Louis Jacques Botes
- Born: 28 November 1980 (age 45) Johannesburg, South Africa
- Height: 1.82 m (5 ft 11 1/2 in)
- Weight: 99 kg (15 st 8 lb; 218 lb)
- School: Potchefstroom Gymnasium
- University: University of Pretoria

Rugby union career
- Position: Flanker / No 8
Youth career
- 2001: Blue Bulls
Senior career
Years	Team	Apps	(Points)
2002–2004	Pumas	42	(30)
2005–2014	Sharks	115	(135)
2005–2014	Sharks (Currie Cup)	156	(247)
2002–2014	Total	292	(412)
- Correct as of 24 March 2015
International career
Years	Team	Apps	(Points)
2009	Emerging Springboks	1	(0)
2014	Barbarians	1	(5)
- Correct as of 24 March 2015

Louis Jacques Botes (born 28 November 1980 in Johannesburg, South Africa) is a former professional rugby union player. He played domestic rugby for the Pumas between 2002 and 2004 and for the Sharks between 2005 and 2014 and also played Super Rugby for the Sharks between 2005 and 2014. He usually played as a flanker or a number eight.

In 2014, he broke Helgard Müller's Currie Cup appearance record, eventually going on to play in 156 Currie Cup matches. In addition, he played in 115 Super Rugby matches for the Sharks, made one appearance for the Emerging Springboks during the 2009 British & Irish Lions tour to South Africa and played in a further 21 first-class games, mainly in the Vodacom Cup and Vodacom Shield competitions.

== Career ==
=== Pumas ===
After a spell in Pretoria where Botes played for the Blue Bulls U21 side in 2001, as well as club rugby for the University of Pretoria second team the Fezelas and their main side UP Tuks in 2002, Botes moved to Witbank to join the Pumas for the 2002 Currie Cup competition. He became a regular for the Pumas, making 42 appearances for them in the 2003 Vodacom Shield, 2003 Currie Cup, 2004 Vodacom Shield and 2004 Currie Cup competitions.

=== Sharks ===
Botes made the move to Durban to join the Sharks prior to the 2005 Super 12 season. He made his Super Rugby debut in the opening match of the competition, a 26–12 defeat to the Stormers in Cape Town, the first of many as he established himself as a regular for the Sharks over the next decade at both Super Rugby and Currie Cup level.

During the 2013 Currie Cup Premier Division, he broke the record for the most number of Currie Cup appearances when he played in his 143rd match against Western Province.

The following season, he became the first ever player to appear in 150 matches in the Currie Cup, when he was named in the starting lineup for their Round Four match against former side the Pumas. He increased this record to 156 before his retirement at the end of the 2014 season.

=== Barbarians ===
His final ever appearances was for the Barbarians against the Leicester Tigers on 4 November 2014 in a match celebrating Barbarians' 125th anniversary. He scored the final try in a 59–26 victory and also slotted the resultant conversion.
