= Nico Scheepers =

South African rugby union player

- Full name: Jacobus Nicolaas Scheepers
- Born: 27 February 1990 (age 36) Port Elizabeth, South Africa
- Height: 1.87 m (6 ft 1 1/2 in)
- Weight: 96 kg (15 st 2 lb; 212 lb)
- School: Nico Malan High
- University: University of the Free State

Rugby union career
- Position: Fullback / Wing
Youth career
- 2008: Eastern Province Kings
- 2009–2011: Free State Cheetahs
Amateur team(s)
Years	Team	Apps	(Points)
2012–2013	UFS Shimlas	11	(111)
Senior career
Years	Team	Apps	(Points)
2011	Emerging Cheetahs	1	(0)
2011–2012	Free State Cheetahs	16	(130)
2012–2013	Free State XV	8	(54)
2012	Cheetahs	3	(0)
2013–2014	Griquas	14	(101)
2015	Griffons	6	(45)
2016–present	Boland Cavaliers	15	(162)
- Correct as of 9 October 2016
International career
Years	Team	Apps	(Points)
2010	South Africa Under-20	4	(5)
- Correct as of 18 May 2014

Jacobus Nicolaas Scheepers (born 27 February 1990) is a South African rugby union footballer. His regular playing position is either full-back or winger. He represents the Griffons in the Currie Cup competition, having previously played for the Free State Cheetahs and Griquas. He also made three appearances for the Cheetahs during the 2012 Super Rugby season and played Varsity Cup rugby for UFS Shimlas.

He joined Griquas on loan for the 2013 Currie Cup Premier Division competition, eventually remaining in Kimberley until the end of 2014.

Scheepers then retired from rugby to return to his family's citrus and potato farm, but reversed his decision a few months later to join Welkom-based side Griffons for the 2015 Currie Cup First Division.

He joined Wellington-based side Boland Cavaliers for the 2016 season.
