= Jean Stemmet =

South African rugby union player

- Full name: Jean Hermanus Stemmet
- Born: 6 June 1986 (age 40) Cape Town, South Africa
- Height: 1.86 m (6 ft 1 in)
- Weight: 95 kg (14 st 13 lb; 209 lb)
- School: Paarl Gimnasium
- University: Stellenbosch University

Rugby union career
- Position: Outside centre
Youth career
- 2004–2007: Western Province
Amateur team(s)
Years	Team	Apps	(Points)
2008–2009	Maties	11	(35)
Senior career
Years	Team	Apps	(Points)
2007	Western Province	1	(0)
2010	Sharks (Currie Cup)	9	(15)
2010	Griquas	45	(75)
- Correct as of 1 November 2013
International career
Years	Team	Apps	(Points)
2009	South Africa Students		
- Correct as of 1 November 2013

Jean Stemmet (born 6 June 1986) is a former South African rugby union footballer, who regularly played as an outside centre. He played professionally between 2006 and 2013 and made first class appearances for Western Province, Sharks and Griquas and also played for Maties during the 2008 and 2009 Varsity Cup competitions.

He retired after the 2013 Currie Cup season and took up a teaching post in Kimberley.
