= Hennie Daniller =

South African rugby union footballer

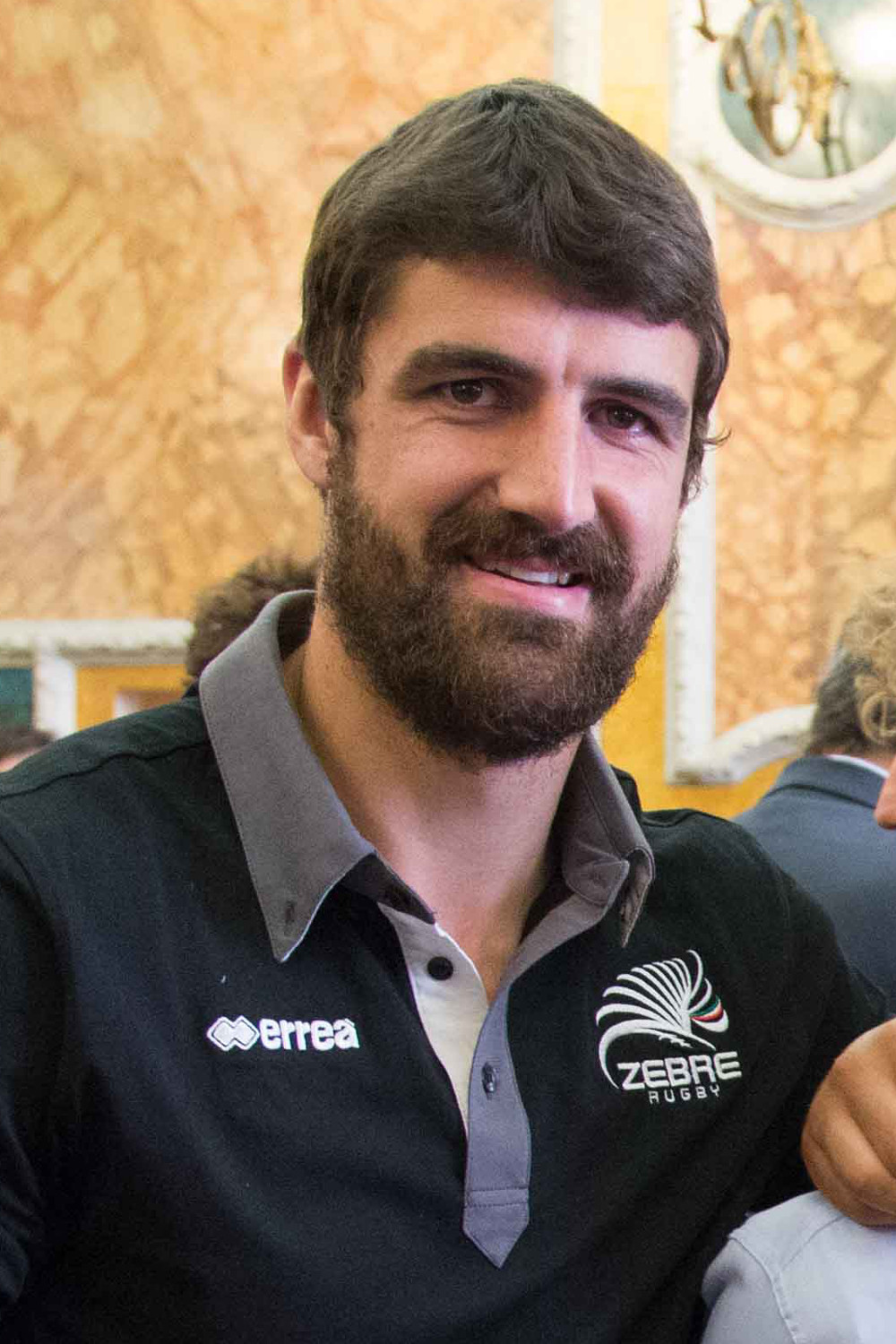
- Full name: Hendrik Joseph Daniller
- Born: 5 April 1984 (age 42) Cape Town, South Africa
- Height: 1.94 m (6 ft 4 1/2 in)
- Weight: 101 kg (15 st 13 lb; 223 lb)
- School: Paarl Gimnasium

Rugby union career
- Position: Fullback
Youth career
- 2004–2005: Blue Bulls
Senior career
Years	Team	Apps	(Points)
2003–2006	Blue Bulls	19	(5)
2004	Bulls	7	(0)
2006–2007	Boland Cavaliers	19	(5)
2008–2014	Cheetahs	90	(45)
2008–2014	Free State Cheetahs	72	(55)
2008	→ Griffons	5	(0)
2014–2015	Zebre	16	(10)
2015	Boland Cavaliers	3	(0)
- Correct as of 4 October 2015
International career
Years	Team	Apps	(Points)
2002	South Africa Schools		
2003	South Africa Under-19		
2004–2005	South Africa Under-21	9	(15)
- Correct as of 26 March 2015

Hendrik Joseph Daniller (born 5 April 1984) is a South African rugby union footballer who most recently played as a fullback for the Boland Cavaliers.

== Career ==
Daniller started his professional career in Pretoria with the Bulls and after shining early on and making 7 appearances in the 2004 Super 2012 season his career began to falter. He moved south to join the Boland Cavaliers in 2006, and helped them earn promotion to the Currie Cup Premier Division in his first season.

Impressive displays in Wellington earned him a move to the Cheetahs. He initially struggled to get game time and spent a spell on loan at the Griffons in 2008. However, he has since become a dependable player for the Cheetahs and currently boasts a combined total of over 130 caps in all competitions.

In May 2014, it was announced that Daniller would move to Italian Pro12 side Zebre for the 2014–15 Pro12 season. He played there for one season before returning to South Africa and rejoining the Boland Cavaliers.

== International ==
Daniller represented South Africa Under 19 in the 2003 IRB Under 19 World Championship and South Africa Under 21 in the 2004 and 2005 IRB Under 21 World Championships.
