= Jurgen Visser =

South African rugby union player

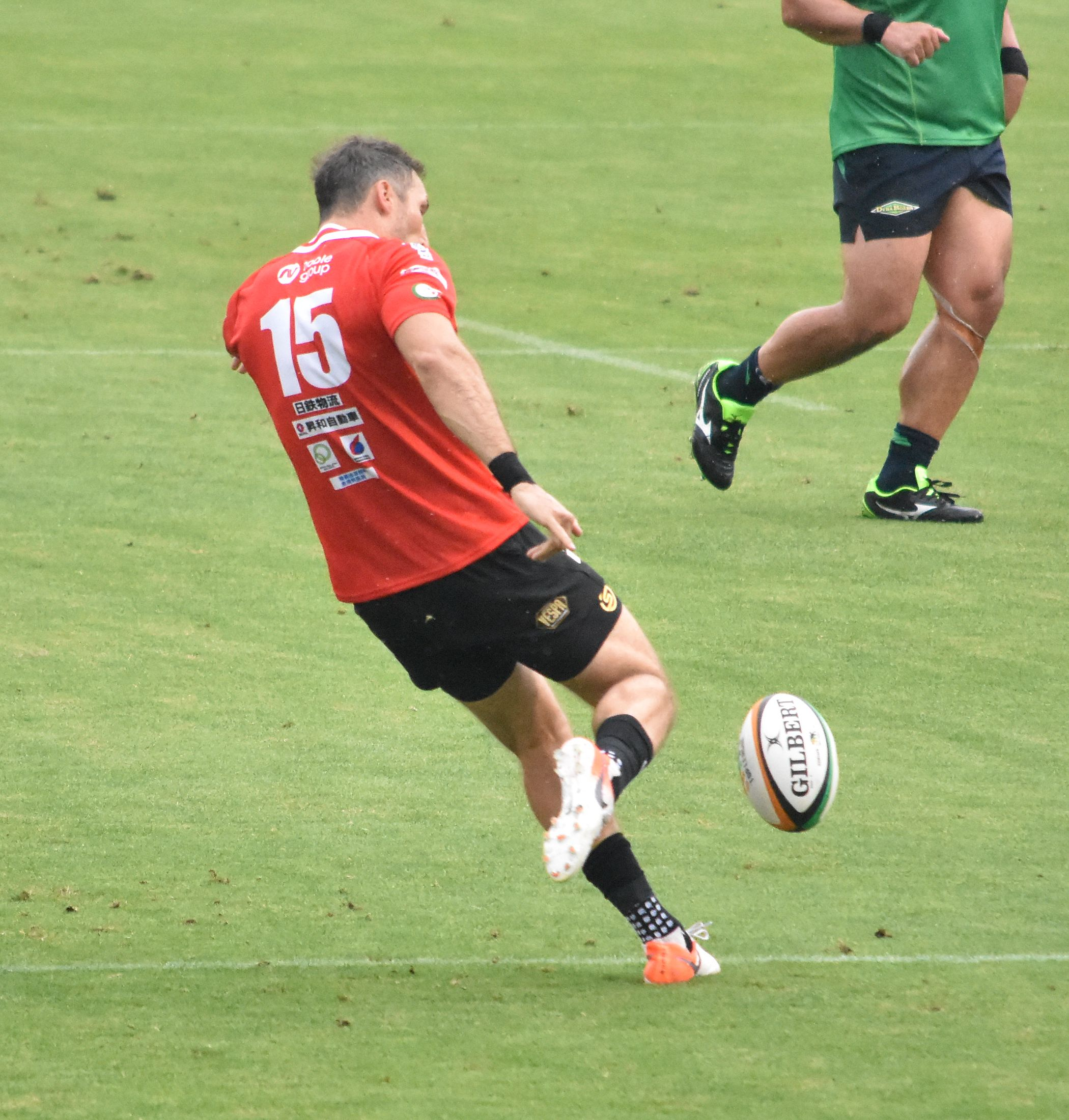
- Full name: Petrus Jurgens Visser
- Born: 13 September 1989 (age 37) Paarl, South Africa
- Height: 1.91 m (6 ft 3 in)
- Weight: 93 kg (205 lb; 14 st 9 lb)
- School: Paarl Gimnasium
- University: Stellenbosch University

Rugby union career
- Position: Fullback / Fly-half
Youth career
- 2007–2009: Western Province
Amateur team(s)
Years	Team	Apps	(Points)
2010	Maties	4	(0)
2011	UP Tuks	4	(20)
Senior career
Years	Team	Apps	(Points)
2010	Western Province	8	(38)
2011–2015	Blue Bulls	40	(54)
2012–2015	Bulls	31	(13)
2016	Southern Kings	10	(3)
2016–2018	NTT DoCoMo Red Hurricanes	13	(65)
2018–2020	Kamaishi Seawaves	14	(66)
- Correct as of 12 November 2018

Petrus Jurgen Visser (born 13 September 1989) is a South African rugby union footballer whose usual position is full back. He represented Western Province in 2010 before moving to Pretoria, where he played for the Blue Bulls in the domestic Currie Cup and Vodacom Cup competitions and for the Bulls in Super Rugby.

He joined the Eastern Province Kings for the 2016 season and was included in the Southern Kings Super Rugby squad.
