= Willie Wepener =

South African rugby union player

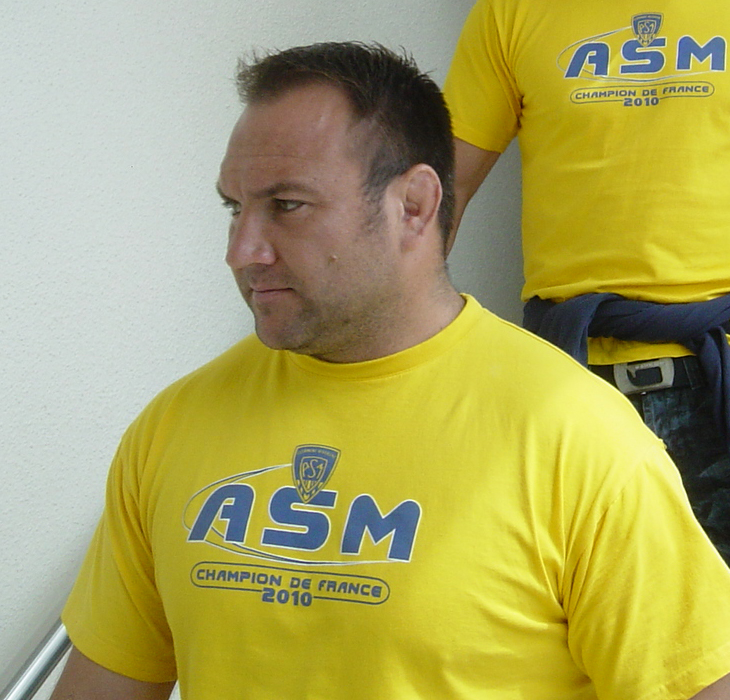
- Full name: Frederik Willem Wepener
- Born: 2 April 1981 (age 45) Newcastle, South Africa
- Height: 1.79 m (5 ft 10 1/2 in)
- Weight: 108 kg (17 st 0 lb; 238 lb)
- School: Helpmekaar Kollege

Rugby union career
- Position: Hooker
- Current team: Golden Lions / Lions
Senior career
Years	Team	Apps	(Points)
2002–2004	Golden Lions	8	(0)
2004	Leopards	15	(10)
2005–2006	Griquas	34	(20)
2006–2009	Golden Lions	38	(35)
2006	Cats	2	(0)
2007–2009	Lions	38	(5)
2009–2010	Clermont	27	(15)
2011–2013	Blue Bulls	25	(5)
2012–2013	Bulls	23	(5)
2013–2014	Golden Lions	12	(5)
2014–2014	Lions	8	(5)
2002–2014	Total	230	(105)
- Correct as of 3 September 2019

Frederik Willem Wepener (born 2 April 1981) is a South African rugby union footballer. He plays as a hooker for the Lions in Super Rugby and the Golden Lions in the Currie Cup. Wepener has previously represented Clermont Auvergne, Griquas, the Leopards and the Blue Bulls.

In August 2013, he rejoined the Golden Lions for the third time, signing a two-year contract with the Johannesburg-based team.
