= Keegan Daniel =

South African rugby union player

- Full name: Keegan Rhys Daniel
- Born: 5 March 1985 (age 41) Humansdorp, South Africa
- Height: 1.86 m (6 ft 1 in)
- Weight: 96 kg (15 st 2 lb; 212 lb)
- School: Dale College, King William's Town
- Occupation: Head of Rugby at Kearsney College

Rugby union career
- Position: Loose forward
Senior career
Years	Team	Apps	(Points)
2006–2014	Sharks XV	11	(35)
2006–2013	Sharks (Currie Cup)	104	(165)
2006–2014	Sharks	105	(80)
2009	Sharks Invitational XV	2	(12)
2014–2016	Kubota Spears	23	(20)
2016–2018	Sharks	14	(0)
2016–2017	Sharks (Currie Cup)	19	(15)
2017–2018	Sharks XV	7	(0)
- Correct as of 21 July 2018
International career
Years	Team	Apps	(Points)
2006	South Africa Under-21	5	(15)
2010–2012	South Africa (test)	5	(0)
2010–2012	South Africa (tour)	1	(0)
- Correct as of 26 March 2015

Keegan Rhys Daniel (born 5 March 1985) is a retired South African rugby union player who last played for the Sharks in Super Rugby and in the Currie Cup and the Sharks XV in the Rugby Challenge. Daniel now serves as the Head of Rugby at Kearsney College.

== Early life and education ==
Born in the rural farming town of Humansdorp, Daniel started his education at Gonubie Primary before moving off to one of South Africa's best known rugby nurseries, Dale College.

== Career ==
Daniel played Craven Week for the Border Bulldogs rugby team in 2003 and was recruited afterwards by the Natal Rugby Academy.

Daniel came onto the provincial scene in the Super Rugby competition which earned him a place in the South Africa Under-21 team. Daniel represented them in the 2006 Under 21 Rugby World Championship in France where South Africa lost 24–13 in the final to the hosts. He was nominated for player of the tournament and went on to claim the South African Under-21 Player of the Year for 2006. He has the ability to play flanker, wing, fly-half and fullback because of his blistering speed and good kicking ability.

Since then, Daniel has played for the Sharks at Super Rugby level. In the 2008 season, he earned Man of the Match awards in consecutive games against 2007 winners the Bulls and the high-flying Blues, scoring three tries in the process. His first try against the Blues came after just 16 seconds in the game – a record at Super Rugby level.

On 30 October 2010, Daniel was selected to tour with the Springboks in their November tour of England, Ireland, Scotland and Wales. He was not selected as a part of the initial squad of 39 but was later added after his performances in the Currie Cup semi-final and final.

On 16 January 2012, Sharks' coach John Plumtree appointed Daniel as the Sharks captain for the 2012 Super Rugby season.

Twice a Currie Cup winner with the Sharks in 2008 and 2010, Daniel played his 100th Currie Cup game against the Blue Bulls on 4 October 2013.

During the 2014 Super Rugby season, it was revealed that Daniel would join Japanese Top League side Kubota Spears on a two-year deal at the conclusion of the tournament.

When his contract expired after the 2015–16 Top League season, he returned to South Africa to rejoin the Sharks.
