= Lwazi Mvovo =

South African rugby union player

- Full name: Lwazi Ncedo Mvovo
- Born: 3 June 1986 (age 40) Mthatha, South Africa
- Height: 1.85 m (6 ft 1 in)
- Weight: 91 kg (14 st 5 lb; 201 lb)
- School: Maria Louw High School

Rugby union career
- Position: Wing/Fullback
Senior career
Years	Team	Apps	(Points)
2007–2019	Sharks XV	26	(60)
2007–2019	Sharks (Currie Cup)	76	(180)
2009	Sharks Invitational XV	1	(0)
2010–2020	Sharks	135	(185)
2017–2018	Canon Eagles	5	(5)
- Correct as of 28 April 2021
International career
Years	Team	Apps	(Points)
2010–2018	South Africa (tests)	17	(30)
2010	South Africa (tour)	1	(0)
2014	Springboks	1	(0)
2017	South Africa 'A'	2	(10)
- Correct as of 6 April 2018
Medal record
Men's Rugby union
Representing South Africa
Rugby World Cup
Bronze medal – third place	2015 England	Squad

Lwazi Ncedo Mvovo (born 3 June 1986) is a retired South African professional rugby union player. He played for the Springboks, the Sharks in Super Rugby and in the Currie Cup as well as the Sharks XV in the Rugby Challenge. He was schooled at Maria Louw High School. His debut for the Sharks was on 27 June 2008 against Boland in Durban.

In the 2010 Currie Cup tournament Lwazi Mvovo was the second highest try scorer with twelve tries. In the Super Rugby competition, he tied for the second highest try scorer, with six.

In October 2010, Mvovo was selected to the South African squad of 39 players to prepare for the November tour of Europe. He made his Springboks debut on 20 November 2010 in the 21–17 loss to Scotland at Murrayfield. Mvovo scored his first international try against England, at Twickenham on Saturday 27 November 2010, in a 21–11 victory.

Mvovo made his Tri Nations debut in a 39–20 defeat against the Australia in Sydney on 23 July 2011. He then appeared against New Zealand in Wellington as number 11. He retired on 4 February 2021 at the age of 34.
