= Derick Minnie =

South African rugby union player

- Full name: Derick Johannes Minnie
- Born: 1986 (age 39–40) Alberton, South Africa
- Height: 1.86 m (6 ft 1 in)
- Weight: 95 kg (209 lb)
- School: Marais Viljoen High School

Rugby union career
- Position: Flanker
- Current team: Zebre
Youth career
- 2005–2007: Golden Lions
Amateur team(s)
Years	Team	Apps	(Points)
2008	UJ	6	(5)
Senior career
Years	Team	Apps	(Points)
2006–2016	Golden Lions XV	28	(30)
2006–2014	Golden Lions	70	(110)
2007	Lions XV	1	(0)
2010–2015	Lions	63	(35)
2013	→ Sharks	3	(15)
2016–2018	Zebre	40	(15)
- Correct as of 13 July 2018

Derick Johannes Minnie (born 1986) is a South African rugby union player for Italian Pro14 side Zebre. He plays as a flanker.

In 2013, he was named in the Sharks touring squad for their 2013 Super Rugby season, but returned to the Lions for the 2014 Super Rugby season.

== Zebre ==
He joined Italian Pro12 side Zebre for the 2016–17 Pro12 season. Minnie played 783 minutes, scoring 15 points in the 2016 - 2017 season for Zebre, playing 14 games in the Pro12, starting 11 and coming on as substitute for 3, he received 1 yellow card.
