= Anthony Volmink =

South African rugby union player

- Full name: Anthony Alfred Volmink
- Born: 10 February 1990 (age 36) Bredasdorp, South Africa
- Height: 1.80 m (5 ft 11 in)
- Weight: 85 kg (187 lb; 13 st 5 lb)
- School: Hoërskool Bredasdorp

Rugby union career
- Position: Winger / Fullback
- Current team: US Cognac
Senior career
Years	Team	Apps	(Points)
2009	Boland Cavaliers	2	(5)
2012–2018	Golden Lions XV	42	(162)
2012–2017	Lions	20	(20)
2012–2017	Golden Lions	39	(100)
2017–2018	Southern Kings	7	(5)
2019–2020	Griquas	16	(50)
2019–2020	Cheetahs	7	(15)
2020–2024	Sharks	15	(25)
2020–2024	Sharks (Currie Cup)	14	(15)
2024–	US Cognac		
- Correct as of 30 September 2025

Anthony Alfred Volmink (born 10 February 1990) is a South African rugby union player who plays as a wing or fullback for US Cognac in France.

Volmink made his Super Rugby debut on 2 June 2012 for the Lions against the Sharks in Johannesburg. Volmink started the game before being replaced by Ruan Combrinck in the 61st minute of a 38-28 Lions victory.

On 27 April 2013, Volmink broke the South African tries-per-game record when he scored nine tries in the Golden Lions 161–3 victory over the hapless Limpopo Blue Bulls in the 2013 Vodacom Cup.

Volmink formerly represented UWC in the Varsity Shield.
