= Raymond Rhule =

South African rugby union player (born 1992)

- Full name: Raymond Kofi Rhule
- Born: 6 November 1992 (age 34) Accra, Ghana
- Height: 1.80 m (5 ft 11 in)
- Weight: 88 kg (194 lb; 13 st 12 lb)
- School: Louis Botha Technical High School
- University: University of the Free State

Rugby union career
- Position: Centre / Wing
- Current team: Stade Rochelais
Youth career
- 2009–2012: Free State Cheetahs
Amateur team(s)
Years	Team	Apps	(Points)
2012	UFS Shimlas	3	(5)
Senior career
Years	Team	Apps	(Points)
2012	Free State XV	1	(0)
2012–2017	Free State Cheetahs	51	(115)
2013–2017	Cheetahs	68	(95)
2018	Stormers	15	(30)
2018–2020	Grenoble	33	(30)
2020–	La Rochelle	70	(65)
- Correct as of 30 April 2021
International career
Years	Team	Apps	(Points)
2012	South Africa U20	3	(10)
2017	South Africa	7	(5)
- Correct as of 10 June 2018

Raymond Kofi Rhule (born 6 November 1992) is a Ghanaian-born South African rugby union player for La Rochelle in the French Top 14.

== Rugby playing career ==
Rhule played in the Springbok U20 side that won the 2012 Junior World Cup, scoring 3 tries. His senior international rugby career started as a call-up for the Springbok squad for the 2012 end-of-year tour to England though he did not play before his first official test call up on 10 June 2017 against the French national team, which was played at Loftus Versfeld Pretoria. He scored his first test try on 19 August 2017 in Port Elizabeth in the Rugby Championship test match between South Africa and Argentina.

He played for the Cheetahs, scoring tries. However concerns were raised about his defence. He moved to the Stormers in 2018, but only played 15 times.

He then joined French Top 14 team Grenoble after the 2018 Super Rugby season, and then to La Rochelle, where his play fitted coach Ronan O'Gara's style of keeping the ball alive.

== Honours ==
=== Club ===
(France) La Rochelle

- European Rugby Champions Cup: 2021–2022, 2022–2023
