= Marcel van der Merwe =

South Africa international rugby union player

- Born: 24 October 1990 (age 36) Welkom, South Africa
- Height: 1.88 m (6 ft 2 in)
- Weight: 128 kg (20 st 2 lb; 282 lb)
- School: Grey College, Bloemfontein; Paarl Boys' High School

Rugby union career
- Position: Prop
- Current team: CA Brive
Senior career
Years	Team	Apps	(Points)
2011–2012	Free State Cheetahs	39	(65)
2012	Cheetahs	3	(0)
2014–2016	Bulls	45	(25)
2016–2020	Toulon	98	(35)
2020	Bulls	3	(0)
2021	Stade Rochelais	2	(0)
2021–2022	London Irish	22	(0)
2022–	CA Brive	19	(0)
- Correct as of 17 June 2022
International career
Years	Team	Apps	(Points)
2010	South Africa Under-20	5	(10)
2014–2015	South Africa	7	(0)
2016	South Africa 'A'	1	(0)
- Correct as of 19 June 2016

Marcel van der Merwe (born 24 October 1990) is a South African rugby union footballer. His regular playing position is prop. He represents London Irish in the English Premiership Rugby.

He was included in the Bulls squad for the 2014 Super Rugby season and made his debut in a 31–16 defeat to the Sharks in Durban.

In June 2016, Van der Merwe joined French Top 14 side Toulon on a two-year deal.

== Representative rugby ==
In May 2014, Van der Merwe was one of eight uncapped players that were called up to a Springbok training camp prior to the 2014 mid-year rugby union tests.

=== South Africa 'A' ===
In 2016, Van der Merwe was included in a South Africa 'A' squad that played a two-match series against a touring England Saxons team. He didn't play in their first match in Bloemfontein, but started the second match of the series, a 26–29 defeat in George.

== Springbok statistics ==
=== Test Match Record ===
Against	Pld	W	D	L	Tri	Con	Pen	DG	Pts	%Won
Australia	2	1	0	1	0	0	0	0	0	50
New Zealand	2	1	0	1	0	0	0	0	0	50
Scotland	1	1	0	0	0	0	0	0	0	100
Total	5	3	0	2	0	0	0	0	0	60

Pld = Games Played, W = Games Won, D = Games Drawn, L = Games Lost, Tri = Tries Scored, Con = Conversions, Pen = Penalties, DG = Drop Goals, Pts = Points Scored
