= Sarel Pretorius =

South African rugby union player

- Full name: Sarel Johannes Pretorius
- Born: 18 April 1984 (age 42) Bloemfontein, South Africa
- Height: 1.75 m (5 ft 9 in)
- Weight: 84 kg (13 st 3 lb; 185 lb)
- School: Reitz High School

Rugby union career
- Position: Scrum-Half
- Current team: Southern Kings
Youth career
- 2003: Griffons
- 2005: Free State Cheetahs
Senior career
Years	Team	Apps	(Points)
2006–2007	Falcons	37	(80)
2007–2011	Griquas	65	(125)
2008–2011	Cheetahs	38	(75)
2012	Waratahs	14	(10)
2012–2015	Free State Cheetahs	33	(70)
2013–2015	Cheetahs	39	(45)
2015–2018	Dragons	72	(70)
2019–present	Southern Kings	7	(5)
- Correct as of 4 May 2019
International career
Years	Team	Apps	(Points)
2008	Emerging Springboks	3	(0)
2009	Royal XV	1	(0)
- Correct as of 22 September 2017

Sarel Johannes Pretorius (born 18 April 1984) is a South African rugby player who plays at scrum half for the Southern Kings in the Pro14.

During 2007–2011 he played in the Currie Cup for Griquas and made his Super Rugby debut for the Cheetahs in 2009 against the Western Force. In 2010 and 2011 he played in every match. In the 2011 Super Rugby competition he equalled Bjorn Basson from the Bulls as the top tryscorer with nine tries. In 2008 he played for the Emerging Springboks and in 2009 he played for the Royal XV against the touring British and Irish Lions.

Pretorius signed for the Waratahs for two years starting in 2012. After just a single season, however, he returned in 2013 to the Cheetahs to play Super Rugby again for them.

In January 2015, Pretorius announced that he would join the Welsh regional team the Dragons at the end of the 2014–2015 season. He was released by the Dragons at the end of the 2017-18 season.

On 20 March 2018, Pretorius returns home to South Africa to join newly Pro14 side Southern Kings from the 2018-19 season.
