= Jason Jaftha =

- Born: Jason Jamaine Jaftha; May 4, 1985 (age 41)

Rugby union career
Refereeing career
| Years | Competition | Apps |
| 2013 | Super Rugby | 6 |
| 2009–2013 | Currie Cup | 39 |
- Correct as of 5 December 2016

Jason Jamaine Jaftha (born 4 May 1985) is a South African Rugby Union referee that refereed in the Super Rugby and Currie Cup competitions. He hails from the Southern Cape (SWD union) where he attended Zwartberg High School.

He served on the Elite Panel and also officiated Super Rugby matches, but suffered a serious knee injury in 2014, which ruled him out for the entire year. He returned to limited action in 2015, taking charge of first class matches in the 2015 Vodacom Cup, but didn't referee in the Super Rugby or Currie Cup competitions, although he was utilised as an assistant on occasion, including the 2015 Currie Cup Premier Division final. At the end of 2015, his injury record also saw him demoted from the South African Rugby Referees' Association's Elite Panel to their National Panel, and he was removed from the refereeing panel altogether for 2017.
