= Jaco Kriel =

South African rugby union player

- Full name: Jacobus Albertus Kriel
- Born: 21 August 1989 (age 37) Standerton, South Africa
- Height: 1.84 m (6 ft 1/2 in)
- Weight: 97 kg (15 st 4 lb; 214 lb)
- School: Hoërskool Standerton
- University: University of Johannesburg

Rugby union career
- Position: Flanker
- Current team: Lions / Golden Lions
Senior career
| Years | Team | Apps | (Points) |
| 2010–2013 | Golden Lions XV | 26 | (35) |
| 2010–2015 | Golden Lions | 44 | (100) |
| 2011–2018 | Lions | 69 | (105) |
| 2016–2018 | Kubota Spears | 7 | (5) |
| 2018–2020 | Gloucester | 20 | (5) |
| 2020–2023 | Lions | 24 | (20) |
| 2020–2023 | Golden Lions | 6 | (0) |
- Correct as of 23 April 2023
International career
| Years | Team | Apps | (Points) |
| 2016–2018 | South Africa | 11 | (0) |
- Correct as of 16 April 2018

Jacobus Albertus Kriel (born 21 August 1989 in Standerton, South Africa) is a rugby union player for Lions. He plays as a flanker.

Kriel has also represented the University of Johannesburg in the Varsity Cup.

He was the headboy of Hoërskool Standerton and captained their first team, he also played Craven Week.

== Career ==
On 28 May 2016, Kriel was included in a 31-man South Africa squad for their three-test match series against a touring Ireland team.

Kriel was a part of the Springbok team that defeated France 3–0 in the mid-year test series in 2017. Following this series, Kriel took over as captain of the Lions for the rest of the 2017 Super Rugby season after regular captain Warren Whiteley was injured during the test series against the French.

Kriel was ruled out for the rest of 2017 following a shoulder injury at training prior to the first test against New Zealand.

On 30 April 2018, it was announced that Kriel had been released from his contract with the Lions to join up with former coach Johan Ackermann at Gloucester Rugby.

The Lions announced on 3 February 2020 that Kriel had rejoined the club on a three-year deal.
