= Franco van der Merwe =

South African rugby union player

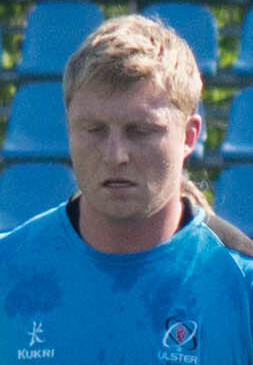
- Born: 15 March 1983 (age 43) Paarl, South Africa
- Height: 1.98 m (6 ft 6 in)
- Weight: 116 kg (18 st 4 lb; 256 lb)
- School: Hartswater High School
- University: North-West University

Rugby union career
- Position: Lock
Youth career
- 2002–2004: Leopards
Senior career
Years	Team	Apps	(Points)
2004–2006	Leopards	58	(40)
2006–2014	Golden Lions	104	(50)
2007–2014	Lions	85	(35)
2013	→ Sharks	16	(0)
2014–2017	Ulster	73	(30)
2017–2020	London Irish	42	(5)
- Correct as of 1 July 2020
International career
Years	Team	Apps	(Points)
2004	South Africa Under-21	3	(0)
2009	Emerging Springboks	1	(0)
2013	South Africa	1	(0)
- Correct as of 24 April 2014

Franco van der Merwe (born 15 March 1983 in Paarl) is a South African rugby union footballer. His regular playing position is lock, although he can also operate as a flanker. Previous clubs include Irish side Ulster in the Pro12, London Irish in Premiership Rugby, the Lions in Super Rugby and the Leopards and the Golden Lions in the Currie Cup.

He also joined the Sharks on loan for the 2013 Super Rugby season.

Van der Merwe has been included in several Springbok squads since June 2012 and finally made his debut in the 2013 Rugby Championship match against New Zealand.

He left the Lions to join Irish side Ulster prior to the 2014–15 Pro12 season. He signed a two-year deal starting on 1 August 2014.

Van der Merwe was signed by Pro14 side Cardiff Blues for the 2017 season, however on 1 August 2017 he was released by the club due to club based "financial challenges".

On 25 August 2017, he was named amongst the starting XV for a pre-season friendly game for London Irish against Richmond on a club trial. On 31 August it was announced he had been signed by the club. He was released ahead of the 2020–21 season.
