= Charl McLeod =

South African rugby union player

- Born: 5 August 1983 (age 43) Johannesburg, South Africa
- Height: 1.8 m (5 ft 11 in)
- Weight: 88 kg (194 lb)
- School: High School Wonderboom, Pretoria

Rugby union career
- Position: Scrum-half
Senior career
Years	Team	Apps	(Points)
2014–2017	Grenoble	43	(25)
2017-	Stade Français	8	(5)
Provincial / State sides
Years	Team	Apps	(Points)
2005–2006	Western Province	12	(5)
2007	Golden Lions	7	(15)
2007	Falcons	11	(10)
2008–2014	Sharks (Currie Cup)	80	(105)
- Correct as of 26 October 2013
Super Rugby
Years	Team	Apps	(Points)
2008–2014	Sharks	73	(25)
- Correct as of 26 July 2014
International career
Years	Team	Apps	(Points)
2011–present	South Africa	2	(0)

Charl McLeod (born 5 August 1983) is a former rugby union player who played for Grenoble in the French Top 14. He played at scrum-half and previously represented the Sharks in the Currie Cup and the Sharks in the Super Rugby competitions.

On 18 November 2010, whilst the Springboks were already two matches into their November tour of Ireland, Wales, Scotland and England, Charl received the call to join the squad.
