= Butch James =

South African rugby union player

- Born: Andrew David James; 8 January 1979 (age 47) Johannesburg, South Africa
- Height: 1.85 m (6 ft 1 in)
- Weight: 100 kg (220 lb; 15 st 10 lb)
- School: Maritzburg College
- Occupation: Professional rugby union footballer

Rugby union career
- Position(s): Fly-half, Inside centre
Senior career
| Years | Team | Apps | (Points) |
| 2007–2011 | Bath Rugby | 68 | (389) |
- Correct as of 3 February 2012
Provincial / State sides
| Years | Team | Apps | (Points) |
| 2000–2007 | Sharks (Currie Cup) | 65 | (450) |
| 2011–2012 | Golden Lions | 14 | (71) |
| 2013 | Sharks (Currie Cup) | 8 | (43) |
- Correct as of 26 October 2013
Super Rugby
| Years | Team | Apps | (Points) |
| 2001–2007 | Sharks | 57 | (390) |
| 2011–2012 | Lions | 16 | (51) |
| 2013 | Sharks | 2 | (0) |
- Correct as of 15 July 2013
International career
| Years | Team | Apps | (Points) |
| 2001–2011 | South Africa | 42 | (159) |
- Correct as of 16 April 2012

Andrew David "Butch" James (born 8 January 1979) is a South African former professional rugby union player who represented South Africa 40 times and was a member of the team that won the 2007 Rugby World Cup. His usual position was fly-half, though he also played inside centre.

James retired at the end of 2013 and joined the Varsity Shield side UKZN Impi as backline and kicking coach.

During his career, James was an ambassador for the Laureus World Sports Awards in South Africa. Also, he has taken up amateur mountain biking and has now completed two Absa Cape Epics. The Untamed African MTB Race takes 1200 riders through the scenic Western Cape region of South African each March. The two-person team stage race covers approximately 700 km and has 15 000m of vertical ascent.

== Early life ==
James was born on 8 January 1979 in Johannesburg, Gauteng, South Africa and was schooled at Maritzburg College in Pietermaritzburg, KwaZulu-Natal. Although his first names are 'Andrew David', he has been known as 'Butch' since his grandmother gave him the nickname as an infant.

== Sharks career ==
James played for the Sharks in the Currie Cup and for the Sharks in Super Rugby. He has twice played in a Super Rugby final for the Sharks, being on the losing side on both occasions: in the 2001 Super 12 final, the Sharks lost 36–6 to the ACT Brumbies, James missing four penalty attempts in the first half; in 2007 they lost 19–20 to the Bulls.

His career with the Sharks and the Springboks was hampered by injury. In 2002, his appearances were restricted, following knee surgery. In the 2004 Super 12 season, he played in every game for the Sharks and looked certain to be recalled to the national squad until an injury to the cruciate ligaments of his left knee, 12 minutes into the last game, against the Stormers, ended his season and kept him out of rugby for six months.

Despite his history of injuries, James has a reputation as an aggressive tackler and excellent place kicker. Early in his career he was frequently penalised for dangerous tackles, particularly tackles above the shoulder, with a swinging arm, or without the use of the arms. In only his second Test, against France, he was cited, and suspended, for an off-the-ball hit on French wing David Bory, and three Tests later, against Australia, he was sin-binned for a tackling offence. More recently he has improved his tackling technique and is now less prone to conceding penalties.

It was announced on 9 July 2007 that he had signed a two-year contract with Bath Rugby though he continues to be eligible to play for the Springboks.

== Springbok career ==
Following the completion of the 2001 Super 12 season, James was included in the Springboks squad and made his debut for South Africa at fly-half in a 32–23 loss to France at Ellis Park. In the following Test, also against France, he contributed five penalty goals in the 20–15 victory in Durban, but was later cited and suspended, missing South Africa's next match, against Italy. He returned for the 2001 Tri Nations Series and started at fly-half in every game, though South Africa only managed to win the one match – 20–15 against Australia in Pretoria.

James was a part of Springboks in November 2002, and was a reserve against a Test against France at Stade Vélodrome in Marseille, and was subsequently moved to starting fly-half for a Test against Scotland. He was switched to inside centre for the following match against England. South Africa lost all of those end-of-season Tests including the 53–3 drubbing by England.

James was included in the Springboks 2006 Tri Nations Series squad, playing in the 35–17 loss to the All Blacks in Wellington, as well as in the following match, against Australia in Sydney, which the Springboks lost 20–18, thanks to a late Wallaby try. James made an impact in the first half, though one of his cross-field kicks was intercepted and led to a Mark Gerrard try. He was also selected for the end-of-year tour to Ireland and England.

After being omitted from the squad for the game against Ireland, James started in the first game against England. In the first half, he scored a try with the help of Jean de Villiers, and at the start of the second half he set up a try for Springbok wing Akona Ndungane, the first of his career. Although he scored 14 points (a try, two penalties, and a conversion), South Africa narrowly lost the game, 23–21, and James had to be substituted after suffering another knee injury, which meant he missed South Africa's 14–25 win in the second Test against England.

James was named in the Springboks squad for the 2007 Rugby World Cup. He played in three pool matches, including those against Samoa and England, and in all three games in the knock-out stages. In the final, against England, his composure and ability to nullify the impact of his opposite number, Jonny Wilkinson, helped South Africa to a 15–6 win.

== Bath career ==
Following the 2007 World Cup tournament, James joined Bath Rugby. He made his debut in Bath's 28–6 victory over Auch in the European Challenge Cup on 10 November and was an immediate success. He was awarded "Man-of-the-Match" after scoring a superb individual try and setting up another with a deft cross-field chip-kick.

On 1 February 2011 it was announced that James would be joining the Lions back in South Africa at the end of May.

After his contract expired at the end of the 2012 season, he rejoined the Sharks.
