= Jean Deysel =

South African rugby union player

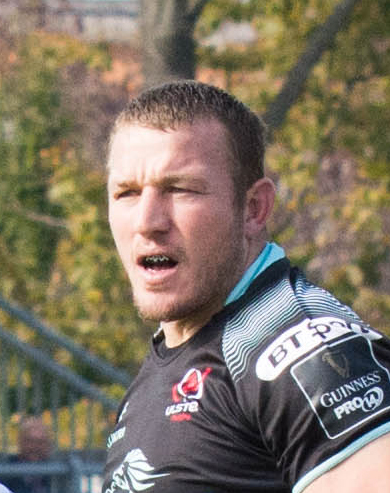
- Full name: Jean Roy Deysel
- Born: 5 March 1985 (age 41) Virginia, South Africa
- Height: 1.91 m (6 ft 3 in)
- Weight: 112 kg (17 st 9 lb; 247 lb)
- School: Hentie Cilliers HS, Virginia

Rugby union career
- Position: Flanker / Lock / Number 8
Youth career
- 2002: Griffons
- 2004–2006: Golden Lions
Senior career
| Years | Team | Apps | (Points) |
| 2005–2007 | Golden Lions | 21 | (5) |
| 2007–2011 | Sharks XV | 10 | (20) |
| 2007–2009 | Sharks Invitational XV | 2 | (15) |
| 2007–2013 | Sharks (Currie Cup) | 61 | (35) |
| 2008–2016 | Sharks | 78 | (5) |
| 2014–2015 | Toyota Verblitz | 10 | (0) |
| 2015–2016 | Sharks (Currie Cup) | 9 | (5) |
| 2017 | → Munster (loan) | 6 | (0) |
| 2017–2018 | Ulster | 10 | (0) |
- Correct as of 6 April 2018
International career
| Years | Team | Apps | (Points) |
| 2007 | South Africa Students | 1 | (0) |
| 2009 | Emerging Springboks | 1 | (0) |
| 2009–2011 | South Africa (test) | 4 | (0) |
| 2009 | South Africa (tour) | 2 | (0) |
- Correct as of 28 March 2015

Jean Roy Deysel (born 5 March 1985 in Virginia, Free State, South Africa) is a former professional rugby union player who most recently played for Ulster in the Pro14.

Deysel signed a two-year contract to join Japanese side Toyota Verblitz at the conclusion of the 2014 Super Rugby season. On 16 March 2017, it was announced that Deysel had joined Irish Pro12 side Munster on a three-month loan as injury cover for his compatriot Jean Kleyn. On 8 April 2017, Deysel made his debut for Munster when he started against Scottish side Glasgow Warriors in a 2016–17 Pro12 fixture. Munster won 10–7, with Deysel being replaced by Peter O'Mahony in the 42nd minute. On 22 April 2017, Deysel made his European debut when he replaced Tommy O'Donnell in Munster's 2016–17 semi-final defeat at the hands of defending champions Saracens in the Aviva Stadium, Dublin. On 27 May 2017, Deysel made his final appearance for Munster when he came off the bench against Scarlets in the 2017 Pro12 Grand Final. Following the completion of his loan spell at Munster, Deysel was granted an early release from his Sharks contract and signed a two-year deal with another Irish province, this time moving to Ulster. Ulster announced on 24 October 2018, Deysel would retire from professional rugby with immediate effect.
