= Riaan Smit =

South African rugby union player

- Full name: Adriaan Jacobus Smit
- Born: 28 April 1984 (age 42) Springs, South Africa
- Height: 1.78 m (5 ft 10 in)
- Weight: 85 kg (13 st 5 lb; 187 lb)
- School: Springs HTS

Rugby union career
- Position: Fly-Half / Full-Back
- Current team: Oyonnax
Youth career
- 2004–2005: Leopards
Senior career
Years	Team	Apps	(Points)
2006	Leopards	3	(5)
2007	Pumas	15	(89)
2008	Falcons	11	(42)
2009	Leopards	4	(37)
2010–2014	Free State Cheetahs	46	(256)
2010	→ Griffons	2	(14)
2010–2014	Cheetahs	25	(106)
2014–present	Oyonnax	2	(0)
- Correct as of 11 October 2014

Adriaan Jacobus "True Blue" Smit (born 28 April 1984) is a South African rugby union professional footballer. He can operate in several positions in the back-line but usually plays as a fly-half or fullback.

== Career ==
Smit currently represents Oyonnax in the French Top 14.

He represented the Cheetahs in Super Rugby and the Free State Cheetahs in both the Currie Cup and Vodacom Cup between 2010 and 2014. He moved to Bloemfontein in 2010 after having something of a nomadic existence prior to that, representing the Leopards, Pumas and Falcons.

He signed a contract with French Top 14 side Oyonnax prior to the 2014–2015 season.
