= 2011 Currie Cup Premier Division =

Domestic rugby union competition

- Champions: MTN Golden Lions
- Runners-up: Sharks
- Matches played: 59
- Attendance: 936,524 (average 15,873 per match)

The 2011 Currie Cup Premier Division was the 73rd season in the competition since it started in 1889 and was contested from July to October 2011. The tournament (known as the Absa Currie Cup Premier Division for sponsorship reasons) is the top tier of South Africa's premier domestic rugby union competition. The MTN Golden Lions won the 2011 Currie Cup Premier Division.

== Competition ==
=== Regular season and title playoffs ===
There were 8 participating teams in the 2011 Currie Cup Premier Division. These teams played each other twice over the course of the season, once at home and once away.

Teams received four points for a win and two points for a draw. Bonus points were awarded to teams that scored 4 or more tries in a game, as well as to teams that lost a match by 7 points or less. Teams were ranked by points, then points difference (points scored less points conceded).

The top 4 teams qualified for the title play-offs. In the semifinals, the team that finished first had home advantage against the team that finished fourth, while the team that finished second had home advantage against the team that finished third. The winners of these semi-finals played each other in the final, at the home venue of the higher-placed team.

=== Relegation ===
The 2012 Currie Cup Premier Division only consisted of six teams, so the bottom 2 teams were relegated to the 2012 Currie Cup First Division.

== Teams ==
Location of teams in 2011 Currie Cup Premier Division

=== Changes from 2010 ===
- None, no teams were relegated.

=== Team Listing ===
Team	Stadium	Capacity
Blue Bulls	Loftus Versfeld, Pretoria	51,762
Free State Cheetahs	Free State Stadium, Bloemfontein	40,911
Golden Lions	Coca-Cola Park, Johannesburg	62,567
Griquas	Griqua Park, Kimberley	18,000
Leopards	Profert Olën Park, Potchefstroom	15,000
Leopards	Royal Bafokeng Stadium, Phokeng	42,000
Pumas	Puma Stadium, Witbank	20,000
Pumas	Mbombela Stadium, Mbombela	40,929
Sharks	Mr Price Kings Park, Durban	55,000
Western Province	DHL Newlands, Cape Town	51,900

== Table ==
2011 Currie Cup Premier Division Table
Pos	Team	Pld	W	D	L	PF	PA	PD	TF	TA	TB	LB	Pts	Qualification
1	Golden Lions	14	10	1	3	452	350	+102	52	33	6	2	50	Title Play-Off Semi-Final
2	Sharks	14	10	0	4	423	321	+102	46	29	7	1	48	Title Play-Off Semi-Final
3	Free State Cheetahs	14	8	2	4	518	344	+174	58	35	8	3	47	Title Play-Off Semi-Final
4	Western Province	14	8	1	5	414	318	+96	44	31	5	2	41	Title Play-Off Semi-Final
5	Blue Bulls	14	8	1	5	452	368	+84	54	40	5	1	40	
6	Griquas	14	6	1	7	429	473	−44	51	61	8	2	36	
7	Pumas	14	2	0	12	297	477	−180	32	60	2	5	15	Relegation Play-Off
8	Leopards	14	1	0	13	263	597	−334	32	80	1	0	5	Relegation Play-Off

Rules for classification: 4 points for a win; 2 points for a draw; 1 bonus point for a loss by seven points or less; 1 bonus point for scoring four or more tries in a match

== Fixtures and results ==
- Fixtures are subject to change.
- All times are South African (GMT+2).

=== Compulsory Friendlies ===
The following compulsory friendlies were played before the 2011 Currie Cup season between Premier Division and First Division teams:

23 June 2011	Boland Cavaliers	22–15	Western Province	Boland Stadium, Wellington
15:00	Try: Johnathan Francke 39' m Chris Buckle 64' m Danwel Demas 73' m Junior Bester 76' c Con: Elgar Watts (1/3) 77'	Scoreboard	Try: Ederies Arendse 2' c JJ Engelbrecht 23' m Con: Isma-eel Dollie (1/2) 3'; Pen: Demetri Catrakilis (1/1) 67'; Cards: Yaasier Hartzenberg (yellow card) 35' to 45'	Referee: Jason Jaftha

1 July 2011	Falcons	28–25	Golden Lions	Barnard Stadium, Kempton Park
18:00	Try: Anrich Richter; Reg Muller; JW Bell; Con: Martin Thomsen (2/2); Pen: Martin Thomsen (2/2); Ulrich van Schalkwyk (1/1)	Scoreboard	Try: Nico Kruger; Uzair Cassiem; Robert de Bruyn; Con: Marais Schmidt (2/2); Pen: Marais Schmidt (2/2)	Referee: Pro Legoete

8 July 2011	Griffons	19–50	Blue Bulls	North West Stadium, Welkom
18:30	Try: Eddie Fredericks 55' c Con: Jannie Myburgh (1/1) 56'; Pen: Jannie Myburgh (4/6) 5', 16', 19', 26'	Scoreboard	Try: Stephan Dippenaar 21' c CJ Stander (2) 31' m, 46' c Stefan Watermeyer 51' c Jurgen Visser 63' m Henri Bantjes 73' c Con: Francois Brummer (3/5) 23', 46', 53'; Wesley Dunlop (1/1) 75'; Pen: Francois Brummer (4/4) 8', 11', 14', 38'	Attendance: 1,000; Referee: Lourens van der Merwe

8 July 2011	Border Bulldogs	10–51	Griquas	Buffalo City Stadium, East London
19:00	Try: Frans Laatz 53' c Con: Dale Sabbagh (1/1) 54'; Pen: Dale Sabbagh (1/2) 12'	Scoreboard	Try: Fabian Juries 7' m Davon Raubenheimer 20' c Justin Downey 27' c Jonathan Mokuena 39' c Jaco Nepgen 61' c Richard Lawson 63' m Rudi Vogt 75' c Con: Monty Dumond (3/4) 21', 28', 40'; Rudi Vogt (2/3) 61', 75'; Pen: Monty Dumond (2/2) 2', 45'	Attendance: 500; Referee: Sindile Mayende

8 July 2011	Eastern Province Kings	20–26	Free State Cheetahs	Nelson Mandela Bay Stadium, Port Elizabeth
19:00	Try: Mzwandile Stick 48' m Pen: Louis Strydom (5/6) 18', 21', 23', 32', 58'	Scoreboard	Try: Rayno Benjamin 62' c Riaan Smit 70' c Con: Riaan Smit (2/2) 63', 71'; Pen: Riaan Smit (3/3) 10', 30', 44'; Robbie van Schalkwyk (1/1) 79'	Attendance: 5,000; Referee: Pro Legoete

8 July 2011	SWD Eagles	22–35	Sharks	Outeniqua Park, George
19:00	Try: Kempie Rautenbach 8' m Wilhelm Koch 19' c Cecil Dumond 64' c Con: Cecil Dumond (1/2) 19'; Elric van Vuuren (1/1) 65'; Pen: Cecil Dumond (1/2) 2'	Scoreboard	Try: Dale Chadwick 14' c, 48' c Francois Kleinhans 40' c Gouws Prinsloo 56' c, 68' c Con: Jacques-Louis Potgieter (5/5) 15', 40', 48', 57', 69'	Attendance: 1,500; Referee: Jonathan Kaplan

=== Regular season ===
==== Round one ====
2011-07-15	Golden Lions	31 – 27	Pumas	Coca-Cola Park, Johannesburg
19:10	Tries: Jacobie Adriaanse 15'; Burton Francis 53'; Alwyn Hollenbach 70'; Con: Burton Francis (2) 15' 54'; Pen: Burton Francis (4) 4' 27' 38' 57'	Scoreboard	Tries: Ashwin Scott 20'; Pieter Engelbrecht 34'; Marius Coetzer 42'; Con: Ricardo Croy (3) 21' 35' 43'; Pen: Ricardo Croy (1) 61'; Drop Goal: Ricardo Croy (1) 10'	Attendance: 3753; Referee: Stuart Berry

2011-07-16	Western Province	26 – 26	Griquas	DHL Newlands, Cape Town
15:00	Tries: Siya Kolisi 27'; Johann Sadie 61'; Con: Gary Van Aswegen (2/2) 28' 62'; Pen: Gary Van Aswegen (4/6) 8' 23' 39' 70'	Scoreboard	Tries: Rocco Jansen 18' 47'; Con: Monty Dumond (2/2) 19' 48'; Pen: Monty Dumond (3/4) 3' 16' 72'; DG: Monty Dumond (1/1) 34'	Attendance: 15,247; Referee: Jonathan Kaplan

2011-07-16	Free State Cheetahs	40 – 12	Leopards	Free State Stadium, Bloemfontein
15:00	Try: W. P. Nel 3' c Andries Strauss 16' c Rayno Benjamin 24' c Corné Uys 32' c Philip Burger 35' c Philip Snyman 75' m Con: Sias Ebersohn (2/2); Riaan Smit (3/3); Tewis de Bruyn (0/1)	Scoreboard	Try: Vainon Willis 29' m BG Uys 67' c Con: Clayton Durand (1/2); Pen: Clayton Durand (0/1)	Attendance: 12,667; Referee: Jason Jaftha

2011-07-16	Sharks	35 – 16	Blue Bulls	Mr Price Kings Park, Durban
17:00	Try: Frédéric Michalak 8' c Louis Ludik 28' m Marcell Coetzee 38' c Keegan Daniel 50' c Con: Frédéric Michalak (3/4); Pen: Frédéric Michalak (3/3) 26', 64', 75'	Scoreboard Report	Try: Derick Kuun 46' c Con: Francois Brummer (1/1); Pen: Francois Brummer (3/4) 5', 13', 19'; Drop: Francois Brummer (0/2)	Attendance: 22,059; Referee: Jaco Peyper

==== Round two ====
2011-07-22	Pumas	22 – 23	Sharks	Mbombela Stadium, Nelspruit
19:00	Try: Coenie van Wyk 34'; Con: Tiaan Marx (1/1) 34'; Pen: Tiaan Marx (5/7) 5', 11', 18', 40', 47'; Cards Deon Scholtz (yellow card) 71' to 81'	Scoreboard	Try: Frédéric Michalak 33'; Dale Chadwick 72'; Con: Frédéric Michalak (2/2) 33', 72'; Pen: Frédéric Michalak (3/3) 8', 16', 21'; Cards Craig Burden (yellow card) 40' to 50'	Attendance: 6050; Referee: Mark Lawrence

2011-07-22	Leopards	9 – 47	Western Province	Profert Olën Park, Potchefstroom
19:10	Pen: Clayton Durand (3/3) 3', 7', 19'	Scoreboard	Try: JJ Engelbrecht 13'; Brok Harris 39'; Johann Sadie 59'; De Kock Steenkamp 73'; Nick Köster 78'; Con: Demetri Catrakilis (5/5) 14', 40', 60', 74', 79'; Pen: Demetri Catrakilis (4/6) 6', 23', 27', 48'	Attendance: 7,264; Referee: Pro Legoete

2011-07-23	Griquas	11 – 49	Golden Lions	Griqua Park, Kimberley
15:00	Try: Jonothan Mokuena 59; Con: Riaan Viljoen (0/1); Pen: Monty Dumond (2/2) 7', 23	Scoreboard	Try: Jano Vermaak 3', 10', 24'; Burton Francis 14'; Lionel Mapoe 32', 80'; Deon van Rensburg 34'; Waylon Murray 77'; Con: Burton Francis (3/6) 11', 25', 35'; Hein Cronje (0/2); Pen: Burton Francis (1/1) 48'	Attendance: 8,274; Referee: Craig Joubert

2011-07-23	Blue Bulls	33 – 30	Free State Cheetahs	Loftus Versfeld, Pretoria
17:05	Try: Gerhard van den Heever 50'; Derick Kuun 55'; Akona Ndungane 60'; Con: Francois Brummer (3/3) 51', 56', 61'; Pen: Francois Brummer (4/6) 14', 40', 46', 69'	Scoreboard Report	Try: Hennie Daniller 10'; Marcel van der Merwe 29'; Francois Uys 51'; Con: Sias Ebersohn (3/3) 11', 30', 52'; Pen: Sias Ebersohn (3/4) 16', 58', 64'; Drop: Sias Ebersohn (0/2)	Attendance: 26,523; Referee: Jonathan Kaplan

==== Round three ====
2011-07-29	Pumas	33 – 40	Griquas	Mbombela Stadium, Mbombela
19:00	Try: Coenie van Wyk 10'c JW Jonker 47'c Corné Steenkamp 58'm Hendrik van der Nest 62'c, 77'c Con: Tiaan Marx (3/4); Coenie van Wyk (1/1); Pen: Tiaan Marx (0/1); Coenie van Wyk (0/1); Cards: Tiaan Marx (yellow card) 29' to 39'	Scoreboard	Try: Richard Lawson 15'm Jean Stemmet 25'm Dusty Noble 29'c Jean Stemmet 34'c Barry Geel 38'c Con: Earl Rose (1/2); Rudi Vogt (2/2); Pen: Riaan Viljoen (1/1) 9'; Earl Rose (0/1); Rudi Vogt (2/2) 53', 71'; Drop: Earl Rose (0/2); Cards: (yellow card) 29' to 39' Jonathan Mokuena	Attendance: 5,263; Referee: Marius Jonker

2011-07-30	Sharks	43 – 34	Free State Cheetahs	Mr Price Kings Park, Durban
15:00	Try: Mark Richards 4'c Louis Ludik 9'c Jacques Botes 18'm, 34'm S'bura Sithole 22'c Con: Frédéric Michalak (3/5); Pen: Frédéric Michalak (2/2) 47', 78'; Drop: Frédéric Michalak (0/1)	Scoreboard	Try: Riaan Smit 24'c Boom Prinsloo 40'c W. P. Nel 58'c Corné Uys 66'c Con: Sias Ebersohn (4/4); Pen: Sias Ebersohn (4/5) 14', 51, 63', 73'; Drop: Sias Ebersohn (0/1)	Attendance: 23,273; Referee: Jason Jaftha

2011-07-30	Golden Lions	53 – 36	Leopards	Coca-Cola Park, Johannesburg
17:00	Try: Jano Vermaak 6'c Dylan des Fountain 13'm Deon van Rensburg 22'c, 37'm Pat Cilliers 31'm Wikus van Heerden 57'c Jacobie Adriaanse 72'c Michael Rhodes 78'c Con: Burton Francis (5/8); Pen: Burton Francis (1/1) 76'; Drop: Burton Francis (0/1)	Scoreboard	Try: Stompie de Wet 15'c, 45'c Vainon Willis 39'm Danie Dames 62' c Whestley Moolman 66'c Con: Clayton Durand (1/1); Wesley Dunlop (3/4); Pen: Clayton Durand (1/1) 11'	Attendance: 7,384; Referee: Sindile Mayende

2011-07-30	Western Province	35 – 7	Blue Bulls	DHL Newlands, Cape Town
17:05	Try: Tiaan Liebenberg 5'c Danie Poolman 19'c Nick Köster 62'c Dewaldt Duvenage 73'c Con: Demetri Catrakilis (4/4); Pen: Demetri Catrakilis (3/4) 17', 26', 37'	Scoreboard Report	Try: Stefan Watermeyer 33'c Con: Francois Brummer (1/1); Pen: Francois Brummer (0/1)	Attendance: 25,000; Referee: Craig Joubert

==== Round four ====
2011-08-05	Leopards	27 – 15	Pumas	Profert Olën Park, Potchefstroom
19:00	Try: Danie Dames 7'c MB Lusaseni 29' c George Tossel 32' c Con: Wesley Dunlop (3/3); Pen: Wesley Dunlop (2/2) 25', 58'	Scoreboard	Try: Deon Scholtz 12' m Dewald Pretorius 19' c Con: Coenie van Wyk (1/2); Pen: Coenie van Wyk (1/2) 51'	Attendance: 6,273; Referee: Lourens van der Merwe

2011-08-05	Griquas	43 – 22	Sharks	Griqua Park, Kimberley
19:10	Try: Ryno Barnes 16'c Hendrik Roodt 23' c Lourens Adriaanse 49' c Jonathan Mokuena 73' c Con: Rudi Vogt (4/4); Pen: Rudi Vogt (5/5) 54', 61', 66', 70', 78'	Scoreboard	Try: Craig Burden 36' c Con: Frédéric Michalak (1/1); Pen: Frédéric Michalak (3/3) 19', 27', 40'; Patrick Lambie (2/2) 52', 64'; Drop: Frédéric Michalak (0/1); Cards: Keegan Daniel (yellow card) 15' to 25'	Attendance: 10,723; Referee: Pro Legoete

2011-08-06	Free State Cheetahs	28 – 22	Western Province	Free State Stadium, Bloemfontein
15:00	Try: Corné Uys 74'c Con: Sias Ebersohn (1/1); Pen: Sias Ebersohn (7/7) 24',37',40',44',51',66',68'	Scoreboard	Try: Johann Sadie 10' c Con: Demetri Catrakilis (1/1); Pen: Demetri Catrakilis (5/6) 8',18',42',69',77'; Drop: Demetri Catrakilis (0/1); Cards: Adriaan Fondse (yellow card) 15' to 25'	Attendance: 17,824; Referee: Sindile Mayende

2011-08-06	Blue Bulls	27 – 36	Golden Lions	Loftus Versfeld, Pretoria
17:05	Try: Chiliboy Ralepelle 9' m Stefan Watermeyer 37'm Akona Ndungane 75'm Con: Francois Brummer (0/3); Pen: Francois Brummer (4/5) 16',24',40',61'; Drop: Francois Brummer (0/1); Cards: Flip van der Merwe (yellow card) 50' to 60' (yellow card) 70' (red card)	Scoreboard Report	Try: Josh Strauss 38'c Michael Killian 57'c, 77'c Con: Elton Jantjies (3/3); Pen: Elton Jantjies (5/7) 4',7',35',50',70'; Cards: Michael Rhodes (yellow card) 71'	Attendance: 27,845; Referee: Jaco Peyper

==== Round Five ====
2011-08-12	Pumas	12 – 16	Blue Bulls	Puma Stadium, Witbank
17:05	Pen: Carl Bezuidenhout (0/1); Ricardo Croy (4/4) 44', 51', 55', 64'; Drop: Ricardo Croy (0/2)	Scoreboard Report	Try: Bjorn Basson 16' c Con: Marnitz Boshoff (1/1); Pen: Marnitz Boshoff (2/3) 24', 61'; Drop: Louis Fouché (1/1) 79'	Attendance: 7243; Referee: Andrew Lees

2011-08-12	Griquas	32 – 18	Leopards	Griqua Park, Kimberley
19:00	Try: Jean Stemmet 17' c Riaan Viljoen 40' c Wilmaure Louw 76' c Con: Rudi Vogt (2/2); Monty Dumond (1/1); Pen: Rudi Vogt (2/3) 10', 24'	Scoreboard	Try: Hoffmann Maritz 28' c Morne Hanekom 67' c Con: Wesley Dunlop (2/2); Pen: Wesley Dunlop (2/2) 42', 46'	Attendance: 7,935; Referee: Joey Salmans

2011-08-12	Western Province	19 – 21	Sharks	DHL Newlands, Cape Town
19:10	Try: Brok Harris 50' c Con: Demetri Catrakilis (1/1); Pen: Demetri Catrakilis (3/4) 57', 66', 68'; Drop: Demetri Catrakilis (1/2) 29'	Scoreboard	Pen: Frédéric Michalak (4/4) 5', 34', 60', 76'; Drop: Frédéric Michalak (3/3) 38', 44', 49'	Attendance: 15,000; Referee: Lourens van der Merwe

2011-08-13	Golden Lions	17 – 10	Free State Cheetahs	Coca-Cola Park, Johannesburg
19:10	Try: Michael Killian 27' m Con: Elton Jantjies (0/1); Pen: Elton Jantjies (4/5) 6', 54', 63', 67'	Scoreboard	Try: Tewis de Bruyn 73' c Con: Riaan Smit (1/1); Pen: Sias Ebersohn (1/3) 3'; Riaan Smit (0/1)	Attendance: 17,834; Referee: Jason Jaftha

==== Round Six ====
2011-08-19	Blue Bulls	44 – 20	Griquas	Loftus Versfeld, Pretoria
17:05	Try: Jano Vermaak 4' c Juandré Kruger 26' m Bjorn Basson 31' c Akona Ndungane 39' c Flip van der Merwe 41' m Louis Fouché 59' c Con: Louis Fouché (4/6); Pen: Louis Fouché (2/3) 10', 15'; Cards: Louis Fouché (0/1)	Scoreboard Report	Try: Sarel Pretorius 51' c Jonathan Mokuena 71' m Lourens Adriaanse 76' m Con: Monty Dumond (1/3); Pen: Monty Dumond (1/2) 28'	Attendance: 12,253; Referee: Sindile Mayende

2011-08-19	Western Province	28 – 26	Golden Lions	DHL Newlands, Cape Town
19:00	Try: Johann Sadie 53' c Con: Demetri Catrakilis (1/1); Pen: Demetri Catrakilis (6/6) 5', 14', 29', 43', 76'; Drop: Demetri Catrakilis (1/1) 62'	Scoreboard	Try: Alwyn Hollenbach 23' c Lionel Mapoe 26' c Con: Elton Jantjies (2/2); Pen: Elton Jantjies (3/4) 37' 47', 61'; Drop: Jaco Taute (0/1); Elton Jantjies (1/1) 72'	Attendance: 17,623; Referee: Marius Jonker

2011-08-19	Sharks	23 – 3	Leopards	Mr Price Kings Park, Durban
19:10	Try: Odwa Ndungane 48' c, 59' m Stefan Terblanche 78' m Con: Frédéric Michalak (1/3); Pen: Frédéric Michalak (2/3) 33', 36'; Cards: Keegan Daniel (yellow card) 75' to 85'	Scoreboard	Pen: Wesley Dunlop (1/1) 55'; Cards: Brendon Snyman (yellow card) 15' to 25'	Attendance: 18,271; Referee: Lourens van der Merwe

2011-08-20	Free State Cheetahs	80 – 16	Pumas	Free State Stadium, Bloemfontein
15:00	Try: Philip Snyman 9' c Boom Prinsloo 23' c, 40' c, 65' c W. P. Nel 33' c Tewis de Bruyn 41' c Corné Uys 45' c Riaan Smit 47' c Lappies Labuschagné 50' c Marcel Van Der Merwe 62' c, 77' c Con: Sias Ebersohn (6/6); Johan Goosen (5/5); Drop: Johan Goosen (1/1) 72'	Scoreboard	Try: Jaco Bouwer 57' m Deon Scholtz 73' m Con: Ricardo Croy (0/2); Pen: Ricardo Croy (2/3) 4', 27'; Drop: Ricardo Croy (0/1); Cards: Tiaan Marx (yellow card) 33' to 43'	Attendance: 11,274; Referee: Pro Legoete

==== Round Seven ====
2011-08-26	Pumas	13 – 24	Western Province	Puma Stadium, Witbank
19:00	Try: Hendrik van der Nest 54' m JP Mostert 80' m Con: Coenie van Wyk (0/1); Tiaan Marx (0/1); Pen: Coenie van Wyk (1/3) 35'	Scoreboard	Try: Johann Sadie 11' c JJ Engelbrecht 28' c Dewaldt Duvenage 63' c Con: Demetri Catrakilis (3/3); Pen: Demetri Catrakilis (1/3); Cards: Conrad Jantjes (yellow card) 40' to 50'; Nick Köster (yellow card) 74' to 84'	Attendance: 6,523; Referee: Stuart Berry

2011-08-26	Leopards	20 – 28	Blue Bulls	Royal Bafokeng Stadium, Phokeng
19:10	Try: George Tossel 41' m Jovan Bowles 67' m Joubert Engelbrecht 82' c Con: George Tossel (1/1); Pen: George Tossel (1/2); Cards: Brendon Snyman (yellow card) 59' to 69'	Scoreboard Report	Try: Warwick Tecklenburg 46' m CJ Stander 59' c Werner Kruger 64' c Con: Louis Fouché (2/3); Pen: Louis Fouché (3/6)	Attendance: 12,632; Referee: Joey Salmans

2011-08-27	Griquas	23 – 20	Free State Cheetahs	Griqua Park, Kimberley
15:00	Try: Sias Ebersohn 29' c Piet van Zyl 33' c Con: Sias Ebersohn (2/2); Pen: Sias Ebersohn (2/2); Cards: Marcel van der Merwe (yellow card) 63' to 75'	Scoreboard	Try: Riaan Viljoen 70' c Jean Stemmet 73' c Con: Earl Rose (2/2); Pen: Rudi Vogt (3/3)	Attendance: 11,217; Referee: Jason Jaftha

2011-08-27	Golden Lions	28 – 19	Sharks	Coca-Cola Park, Johannesburg
17:05	Try: Lionel Mapoe 21' c Con: Elton Jantjies (1/1); Pen: Elton Jantjies (7/7)	Scoreboard	Try: Stefan Terblanche 61' c Con: Frédéric Michalak (1/1); Pen: Frédéric Michalak (3/3); Meyer Bosman (1/1)	Attendance: 29,724; Referee: Jaco Peyper

==== Round Eight ====
2011-09-02	Pumas	20 – 34	Golden Lions	Mbombela Stadium, Mbombela
19:10	Try: Corné Steenkamp 58' c MJ Mentz 76' c Con: Coenie van Wyk (2/2); Pen: Coenie van Wyk (2/3)	Scoreboard	Try: Michael Killian 11' c Michael Rhodes 28' c Jaco Taute 40' c Johan Snyman 82' c Con: Elton Jantjies (4/4); Pen: Elton Jantjies (2/3)	Attendance: 5,276; Referee: Jason Jaftha

2011-09-03	Griquas	35 – 41	Western Province	Griqua Park, Kimberley
15:00	Try: Rudi Vogt 7' m, 58' m Davon Raubenheimer 17' c, 49' c Marnus Schoeman 71' m Con: Rudi Vogt (2/4); Pen: Rudi Vogt (1/2); Earl Rose (1/1)	Scoreboard	Try: Tiaan Liebenberg 25' c Nick Köster 31' c Dewaldt Duvenage 39' c Conrad Jantjes 44' m JJ Engelbrecht 53' m, 74' m Johann Sadie 72' m Con: Demetri Catrakilis (3/7)	Attendance: 15,834; Referee: Marius Jonker

2011-09-03	Leopards	17 – 64	Free State Cheetahs	Profert Olën Park, Potchefstroom
16:00	Try: Whestley Moolman 58' c Joubert Engelbrecht 74' c Con: Wesley Dunlop (2/2); Pen: Wesley Dunlop (1/1); Cards: Joubert Engelbrecht (yellow card) 18' to 29'	Scoreboard	Try: Boom Prinsloo 5' c Coenie Oosthuizen 20' c, 38' c Marcel van der Merwe 42' c, 63' c Philip Burger 48' m Riaan Smit 56' c Cameron Jacobs 72' c Philip Snyman 77' c Con: Johan Goosen (2/2); Sias Ebersohn (6/7); Pen: Johan Goosen (1/1)	Attendance: 5,263; Referee: Stuart Berry

2011-09-03	Blue Bulls	27 – 39	Sharks	Loftus Versfeld, Pretoria
17:05	Try: Warwick Tecklenburg; Bjorn Basson (2); CJ Stander; Con: Louis Fouché; Francois Brummer; Pen: Louis Fouché	Scoreboard Report	Try: S'bura Sithole; Craig Burden Lwazi Mvovo; Con: Frédéric Michalak (2/3); Pen: Frédéric Michalak (3); Meyer Bosman (3)	Attendance: 22,724; Referee: Mark Lawrence

==== Round Nine ====
2011-09-09	Golden Lions	41 – 25	Griquas	Coca-Cola Park, Johannesburg
19:10	Try: Deon van Rensburg 16' m, 43' c Pat Cilliers 23' c Michael Killian 25' m Alwyn Hollenbach 53' c Jaco Taute 82' c Con: Elton Jantjies (4/6); Pen: Elton Jantjies (1/1) 12'; Cards: Jaco Taute (yellow card) 48' to 58'; Doppies la Grange (yellow card) 66' to 76'	Scoreboard	Try: Jonathan Mokuena 57' m Ryno Barnes 62' c Earl Rose 73' c Con: Rudi Vogt (2/3); Pen: Rudi Vogt (2/3) 29', 38'; Cards: Earl Rose (yellow card) 15' to 25'	Attendance: 8,550; Referee: Mark Lawrence

2011-09-10	Sharks	33 – 20	Pumas	Mr Price Kings Park, Durban
15:00	Try: Craig Burden 10' c Jean Deysel 37' c Anton Bresler 49' m Jacques Botes 62' c, 73' c Con: Frédéric Michalak (4/5); Pen: Frédéric Michalak (0/2)	Scoreboard	Try: Coenie van Wyk 14' c, 29' c Con: Coenie van Wyk (2/2); Pen: Tiaan Marx (1/1) 3'; Coenie van Wyk (1/2), 44'	Attendance: 13,251; Referee: Jaco Peyper

2011-09-10	Western Province	49 – 21	Leopards	DHL Newlands, Cape Town
16:00	Try: Tertius Daniller 26' c Nick Fenton-Wells 46' c Danie Poolman 55' c Nic Groom 61' m Brok Harris 75' c Siya Kolisi 82' c Con: Isma-eel Dollie (3/3); Dewaldt Duvenage (2/3); Pen: Isma-eel Dollie (3/4) 14', 31', 38'	Scoreboard	Try: Whestley Moolman 8' c Joubert Engelbrecht 18' c Hoffmann Maritz 62' c Con: Clayton Durand (2/2); Andrew van Wyk (1/1)	Attendance: 11,784; Referee: Sandile Mayende

2011-09-10	Free State Cheetahs	22 – 22	Blue Bulls	Free State Stadium, Bloemfontein
17:05	Try: Wilhelm Steenkamp 49' c Con: Johan Goosen (1/1); Pen: Johan Goosen (5/5) 5', 9', 27', 37', 63'	Scoreboard Report	Try: Francois Venter 73' c Con: Louis Fouché (1/1); Pen: Louis Fouché (5/7) 22', 35', 40', 61', 83'; Cards: Flip van der Merwe (yellow card) 36' to 47'	Attendance: 16,836; Referee: Marius Jonker

==== Round Ten ====
2011-09-16	Leopards	23 – 43	Golden Lions	Profert Olën Park, Potchefstroom
19:10		Scoreboard		Attendance: 2,161; Referee: Stuart Berry

2011-09-17	Griquas	31 – 34	Pumas	Griqua Park, Kimberley
15:00		Scoreboard		Attendance: 5,718; Referee: Jaco Peyper

2011-09-17	Free State Cheetahs	53 – 32	Sharks	Free State Stadium, Bloemfontein
15:00		Scoreboard		Attendance: 18,032; Referee: Mark Lawrence

2011-09-17	Blue Bulls	28 – 20	Western Province	Loftus Versfeld, Pretoria
17:05	Try: CJ Stander; Zane Kirchner; Wynand Olivier; Con: Francois Brummer (2); Pen: Francois Brummer (3)	Scoreboard; Report	Try: Danie Poolman; Marcel Brache; Siya Kolisi; Con: Isma-eel Dollie; Pen: Isma-eel Dollie	Attendance: 27,256; Referee: Pro Legoete

==== Round Eleven ====
2011-09-23	Pumas	32 – 19	Leopards	Mbombela Stadium, Mbombela
19:00	Tries: Coenie van Wyk; Wilhelm Loock; Jaco Bouwer; Con: Coenie van Wyk; Pens: Coenie van Wyk (5)	Scoreboard	Tries: George Tossel; Gavin Williamson; Stompie de Wet; Cons: Wesley Dunlop (2)	Attendance: 2,240; Referee: Pro Legoete

2011-09-23	Sharks	29 – 18	Griquas	Mr Price Kings Park, Durban
19:10	Tries: Dale Chadwick; Jean Deysel; Meyer Bosman; Lwazi Mvovo; Cons: Frédéric Michalak (2); Meyer Bosman; Pen: Meyer Bosman	Scoreboard	Tries: Rudi Vogt; Matthew Rosslee; Con: Rudi Vogt; Pens: Rudi Vogt (2)	Attendance: 21,170; Referee: Jason Jaftha

2011-09-24	Golden Lions	18 – 21	Blue Bulls	Coca-Cola Park, Johannesburg
15:00	Tries: Michael Killian; Joshua Strauss; Con: Elton Jantjies; Pens: Elton Jantjies (2)	Scoreboard Report	Tries: Jano Vermaak; Warwick Tecklenburg; Con: Louis Fouché; Pens: Louis Fouché (2); DG: Louis Fouché	Attendance: 38,721; Referee: Lourens van der Merwe

2011-09-24	Western Province	20 – 34	Free State Cheetahs	DHL Newlands, Cape Town
17:05	Tries: Nick Fenton-Wells; Deon Fourie; Cons: Lionel Cronjé (2); Pens: Lionel Cronjé (2)	Scoreboard	Tries: Cameron Jacobs; Pieter van Zyl; Lappies Labuschagné; Coenie Oosthuizen; Cons: Johan Goosen (3); Sias Ebersohn; Pen: Johan Goosen; DG: Sias Ebersohn	Attendance: 25,172; Referee: Stuart Berry

==== Round Twelve ====
2011-09-30	Blue Bulls	47 – 12	Pumas	Loftus Versfeld, Pretoria
19:10	Tries: Flip van der Merwe; Louis Fouché; CJ Stander; Francois Venter; Arno Botha; Bjorn Basson; Cons: Louis Fouché (4); Pens: Louis Fouché (3)	Scoreboard Report	Tries: Jaco Bouwer; Marius Coetzer; Con: Coenie van Wyk	Attendance: 17,273; Referee: Sindile Mayende

2011-10-01	Free State Cheetahs	25 – 25	Golden Lions	Free State Stadium, Bloemfontein
15:00	Try Piet van Zyl; Con: Sias Ebersohn; Pens: Johan Goosen (5); Sias Ebersohn	Scoreboard	Tries: Cobus Grobbelaar; Jacobie Adriaanse; Michael Killian; Cons: Elton Jantjies (2); Pens: Elton Jantjies (2)	Attendance: 14,794; Referee: Marius Jonker

2011-10-01	Leopards	23 – 38	Griquas	Profert Olën Park, Potchefstroom
16:00	Tries: Wesley Dunlop; Vainon Willis; Cons: Wesley Dunlop; Clayton Durand; Pens: Wesley Dunlop (2); DG: Wesley Dunlop	Scoreboard	Tries: Sarel Pretorius; Rocco Jansen; Riaan Viljoen; Jonathan Mokuena; Jaco Nepgen; Cons: Rudi Vogt (3); Monty Dumond (2); Pen: Rudi Vogt	Attendance: 500; Referee: Pro Legoete

2011-10-01	Sharks	10 – 15	Western Province	Mr Price Kings Park, Durban
17:05	Try: Jean Deysel; Con: Meyer Bosman; Pen: Frédéric Michalak	Scoreboard	Tries: Danie Poolman; Dewaldt Duvenhage; Con: Lionel Cronjé; Pen: Dewaldt Duvenhage	Attendance: 26,826; Referee: Mark Lawrence

==== Round Thirteen ====
2011-10-07	Pumas	23 – 29	Free State Cheetahs	Puma Stadium, Witbank
19:10	Tries: Dewald Pretorius; Jaco Bouwer; Cons: Carl Bezuidenhout (2); Pens: Carl Bezuidenhout (3)	Scoreboard	Tries: Philip van der Walt; Marcel van der Merwe; Sias Ebersohn; Andries Strauss; Cons: Sias Ebersohn (3); Pen: Sias Ebersohn	Attendance: 2,700; Referee: Sindile Mayende

2011-10-08	Griquas	48 – 44	Blue Bulls	Griqua Park, Kimberley
15:00	Try: Rudi Vogt 18' c Rocco Jansen 25' c, 64' c Dusty Noble 36' c Matthew Rosslee 61' c, 69' c Con: Rudi Vogt (6/6); Pen: Rudi Vogt (2/3) 6', 31'; Drop: Riaan Viljoen (0/2)	Scoreboard Report	Try: Bjorn Basson 10' c, 28'; Akona Ndungane 14' m Jano Vermaak 42' c Jacques Potgieter 56' c, 80' m Con: Louis Fouché (4/6); Pen: Louis Fouché (1/1) 53'; Drop: Louis Fouché (1/1) 3'; Cards: Gary Botha (yellow card) 44' to 54'	Attendance: 10,847; Referee: Lourens van der Merwe

2011-10-08	Golden Lions	42 – 25	Western Province	Coca-Cola Park, Johannesburg
17:05	Try: Bandise Maku 6' c Jaco Taute 39' c, 62' m Martin Bezuidenhout 68' c Derick Minnie 80' c Con: Elton Jantjies (4/5); Pen: Elton Jantjies (3/3) 23', 32', 75'	Scoreboard	Try: Deon Fourie 76' c Con: Demetri Catrakilis (1/1); Pen: Demetri Catrakilis (1/1) 11'; Drop: Demetri Catrakilis (4/5) 21', 28', 51', 56', 60'	Attendance: 35,954; Referee: Jaco Peyper

2011-10-08	Leopards	14 – 41	Sharks	Royal Bafokeng Stadium, Phokeng
19:10	Try: Johann Laker 43' c Danie Dames 56' c Con: Wesley Dunlop (2/2)	Scoreboard	Try: Adrian Jacobs 13' c Jacques Botes 23' m Lwazi Mvovo 53' m Conrad Hoffmann 59' c Keegan Daniel 78' c S'bura Sithole 81' c Con: Frédéric Michalak (4/6); Pen: Frédéric Michalak (1/1) 7'	Attendance: 4,485; Referee: Joey Salmans

==== Round Fourteen ====
2011-10-14	Blue Bulls	92 – 21	Leopards	Loftus Versfeld, Pretoria
19:10	Try: Akona Ndungane 10' c CJ Stander 13' c, 72' m Jano Vermaak 20' c Francois Venter 26' c Juandré Kruger 29' c, 45' m Bjorn Basson 52' c, 58' c, 70' c Penalty try 54' c Arno Botha 63' c Gary Botha 69' c Francois Brummer 76' m Con: Louis Fouché (11/14)	Scoreboard; Report	Try: Wesley Dunlop 22' c Joubert Engelbrecht 37' c Hoffmann Maritz 40' c Con: Wesley Dunlop (3/3); Pen: Wesley Dunlop (0/1); Cards: MB Lusaseni (yellow card) 54' to 64'; Bradley Mockford (yellow card) 68' to 78'	Attendance: 5,876; Referee: Stuart Berry

2011-10-15	Free State Cheetahs	49 – 39	Griquas	Free State Stadium, Bloemfontein
15:00		Scoreboard		Attendance: 16,724; Referee: Marius Jonker

2011-10-15	Western Province	43 – 18	Pumas	DHL Newlands, Cape Town
17:05		Scoreboard		Attendance: 17,823; Referee: Pro Legoete

2011-10-15	Sharks	53 – 9	Golden Lions	Mr Price Kings Park, Durban
19:10		Scoreboard		Attendance: 27,835; Referee: Jason Jaftha

=== Title Play-Off Games ===
==== Semi-finals ====
2011-10-22	Sharks	20 – 13	Free State Cheetahs	Mr Price Kings Park, Durban
14:30	Try: Tendai Mtawarira 44' c Odwa Ndungane 53' c Con: Patrick Lambie (2/2); Pen: Patrick Lambie (2/4) 36', 75'; Frédéric Michalak (0/2)	Scoreboard	Try: Hennie Daniller 23' c Con: Johan Goosen (1/1); Pen: Johan Goosen (2/3) 14', 19'; Drop: Johan Goosen (0/1)	Attendance: 31,512; Referee: Marius Jonker

2011-10-22	Golden Lions	29 – 20	Western Province	Coca-Cola Park, Johannesburg
17:00	Try: Jaco Taute 36' c Michael Killian 48' c Con: Elton Jantjies (2/2); Pen: Jaco Taute (0/1); Elton Jantjies (5/5) 13', 20', 22', 28', 60'; Butch James (0/1); Drop: Elton Jantjies (0/1)	Scoreboard	Try: Juan de Jongh 70' m Con: Demetri Catrakilis (0/1); Pen: Demetri Catrakilis (5/6) 9', 25', 33', 39', 58'	Attendance: 31,713; Referee: Jaco Peyper

==== Final ====
2011-10-29	Golden Lions	42 - 16	Sharks	Coca-Cola Park, Johannesburg
		Scoreboard		Attendance: 58,723

== Top scorers ==
The following sections contain only points and tries which have been scored in competitive games in the 2011 Currie Cup Premier Division.

=== Top points scorers ===
Rank	Player	Team	Points
1	Frédéric Michalak	Sharks	192
2	Elton Jantjies	Golden Lions	188
3	Demetri Catrakilis	Western Province	150
4	Rudi Vogt	Griquas	144
5	Sias Ebersohn	Free State Cheetahs	126
5	Louis Fouché	Blue Bulls	126
7	Johan Goosen	Free State Cheetahs	98
8	Wesley Dunlop	Leopards	82
9	Coenie van Wyk	Pumas	71
10	Francois Brummer	Blue Bulls	63

Last updated: 29 Oct 2011
Source: South African Rugby Union

=== Top try scorers ===
Rank	Player	Team	Tries
1	Bjorn Basson	Blue Bulls	10
1	Michael Killian	Golden Lions	10
3	Jacques Botes	Sharks	8
3	Jano Vermaak	Blue Bulls	8
5	Jaco Taute	Golden Lions	7
6	Rocco Jansen	Griquas	6
6	Lappies Labuschagne	Free State Cheetahs	6
6	Johann Sadie	Western Province	6
6	CJ Stander	Blue Bulls	6
6	Marcel van der Merwe	Free State Cheetahs	6

Last updated: 29 Oct 2011
Source: South African Rugby Union

== Awards ==
Month	Coach	Team	Player	Team
July	John Plumtree	Sharks	Jano Vermaak	Blue Bulls
August	John Mitchell	Golden Lions	Demetri Catrakilis	Western Province
September	Jimmy Stonehouse	Pumas	Johan Goosen	Free State Cheetahs
October	Naka Drotské	Free State Cheetahs	Rudi Vogt	Griquas

== See also ==
- 2011 Currie Cup First Division
- 2011 Vodacom Cup
- 2011 Under-21 Provincial Championship
- 2011 Under-19 Provincial Championship
- Currie Cup
- ABSA
