= 2018 Stormers season =

Stormers
- 2018 season
- Head coach: Robbie Fleck
- Captain: Siya Kolisi
- Stadium: DHL Newlands, Cape Town
- Overall: 11th
- South African Conference: 4th
- Record: Won 6, Lost 10
- Top try scorer: All: Raymond Rhule (6)
- Top points scorer: All: Damian Willemse (98)

In 2018, the Stormers participated in the 2018 Super Rugby competition, the 23rd edition of the competition since its inception in 1996. They were included in the South African Conference of the competition, along with the Bulls, Jaguares, Lions and Sharks.

The Stormers won six and lost ten of their matches during the regular season of the competition to finish fourth in the South African Conference, and in 11th place overall.

== Personnel ==
=== Coaches and management ===
The Stormers coaching and management staff for the 2018 Super Rugby season were:

2018 Stormers coaches and management
Name	Title
Robbie Fleck	Head coach
Russell Winter	Assistant coach (forwards and contact)
Paul Treu	Assistant coach (structured play)
Paul Feeney	Assistant coach (backs and skills)
Steph du Toit	Strength and conditioning coach
Human Kriek	Strength and conditioning coach
Gareth Wright	Kicking coach
Wayne Hector	Physiotherapist
Anuerin Robin	Physiotherapist
Greg Daniels	Masseur
Karen Schwabe	Team doctor

=== Squad ===
The following players were named in the Stormers squad for the 2018 Super Rugby season:

2018 Stormers squad
Player	Position/s	Date of birth (age)	Super Rugby		Stormers	
Player	Position/s	Date of birth (age)	Apps	Pts	Apps	Pts
(South Africa) Juarno Augustus	Loose forward	9 December 1997 (aged 20)	2	0	2	0
(South Africa) Craig Barry	Fullback	30 April 1992 (aged 25)	0	0	0	0
(South Africa) Nizaam Carr	Loose forward	4 April 1991 (aged 26)	82	40	82	40
(South Africa) Jaco Coetzee	Loose forward	10 June 1996 (aged 21)	1	0	1	0
(South Africa) Damian de Allende	Centre	25 November 1991 (aged 26)	61	50	61	50
(South Africa) Jan de Klerk	Lock	10 February 1991 (aged 27)	9	0	9	0
(South Africa) Paul de Wet	Scrum-half	16 March 1996 (aged 21)	0	0	0	0
(South Africa) Stephan de Wit	Loose forward	1 January 1992 (aged 26)	3	0	1	0
(South Africa) Daniël du Plessis	Centre	17 March 1995 (aged 22)	9	10	9	10
(South Africa) Jean-Luc du Plessis	Fly-half	7 May 1994 (aged 23)	14	150	14	150
(South Africa) Johan du Toit	Lock	8 September 1995 (aged 22)	1	0	1	0
(South Africa) Pieter-Steph du Toit	Lock	20 August 1992 (aged 25)	54	15	27	15
(South Africa) Dewaldt Duvenage	Scrum-half	22 May 1988 (aged 29)	79	40	79	40
(South Africa) JJ Engelbrecht	Centre	22 February 1989 (aged 28)	65	45	0	0
(South Africa) Eben Etzebeth	Lock	29 October 1991 (aged 26)	54	20	54	20
(South Africa) Neethling Fouché	Prop	10 January 1993 (aged 25)	0	0	0	0
(South Africa) JC Janse van Rensburg	Prop	9 January 1986 (aged 32)	77	5	24	0
(South Africa) Herschel Jantjies	Scrum-half	22 April 1996 (aged 21)	0	0	0	0
(South Africa) Steven Kitshoff	Prop	10 February 1992 (aged 26)	63	0	63	0
(South Africa) Siya Kolisi	Loose forward	16 June 1991 (aged 26)	89	70	89	70
(South Africa) Dan Kriel	Centre	15 February 1994 (aged 24)	13	0	10	0
(South Africa) Dillyn Leyds	Wing	12 September 1992 (aged 25)	38	80	35	80
(South Africa) Wilco Louw	Prop	20 July 1994 (aged 23)	17	5	17	5
(South Africa) Frans Malherbe	Prop	14 March 1991 (aged 26)	79	15	79	15
(South Africa) SP Marais	Fullback	16 March 1989 (aged 28)	58	90	12	72
(South Africa) Bongi Mbonambi	Hooker	7 January 1991 (aged 27)	61	5	46	5
(South Africa) Salmaan Moerat	Lock	3 June 1998 (aged 19)	0	0	0	0
(South Africa) Dean Muir	Hooker	6 February 1989 (aged 29)	0	0	0	0
(South Africa) Sikhumbuzo Notshe	Loose forward	28 May 1993 (aged 24)	38	60	38	60
(South Africa) Scarra Ntubeni	Hooker	18 February 1991 (aged 26)	45	20	45	20
(South Africa) Caylib Oosthuizen	Prop	1 September 1989 (aged 28)	28	5	3	0
(South Africa) Sergeal Petersen	Wing	1 August 1994 (aged 23)	28	60	0	0
(South Africa) Justin Phillips	Scrum-half	3 February 1995 (aged 23)	6	5	6	5
(South Africa) Raymond Rhule	Wing	6 November 1992 (aged 25)	66	95	0	0
(South Africa) Carlü Sadie	Prop	7 May 1997 (aged 20)	0	0	0	0
(South Africa) Ramone Samuels	Hooker	3 November 1994 (aged 23)	19	5	16	5
(South Africa) JD Schickerling	Lock	9 May 1995 (aged 22)	17	0	17	0
(South Africa) Seabelo Senatla	Wing	10 February 1993 (aged 25)	14	25	14	25
(South Africa) Joshua Stander	Fly-half	1 January 1994 (aged 24)	0	0	0	0
(South Africa) Kobus van Dyk	Loose forward	6 July 1994 (aged 23)	6	0	6	0
(South Africa) Chris van Zyl	Lock	12 July 1986 (aged 31)	13	0	13	0
(South Africa) Alistair Vermaak	Prop	28 April 1989 (aged 28)	24	0	24	0
(South Africa) Jano Vermaak	Scrum-half	1 January 1985 (aged 33)	120	108	16	5
(South Africa) EW Viljoen	Fullback	9 May 1995 (aged 22)	16	20	16	20
(South Africa) George Whitehead	Fly-half	17 March 1989 (aged 28)	18	33	0	0
(South Africa) Cobus Wiese	Loose forward	2 June 1997 (aged 20)	4	0	4	0
(South Africa) Damian Willemse	Fly-half	7 May 1998 (aged 19)	5	32	5	32
(South Africa) Eduard Zandberg	Lock	14 February 1996 (aged 22)	0	0	0	0
Note: Players' ages and statistics are correct as of 17 February 2018, the date of the opening round of the competition.

== Standings ==
2018 Super Rugby standings
Pos	Team	Pld	W	D	L	PF	PA	PD	TF	TA	TB	LB	Pts	Qualification
1	Crusaders (C)	16	14	0	2	542	295	+247	77	39	7	0	63	Quarter-finals (Conference leaders)
2	Lions	16	9	0	7	519	435	+84	77	55	6	4	46	Quarter-finals (Conference leaders)
3	Waratahs	16	9	1	6	557	445	+112	74	59	4	2	44	Quarter-finals (Conference leaders)
4	Hurricanes	16	11	0	5	474	343	+131	66	43	5	2	51	Quarter-finals (Wildcard)
5	Chiefs	16	11	0	5	463	368	+95	60	48	3	2	49	Quarter-finals (Wildcard)
6	Highlanders	16	10	0	6	437	445	−8	59	57	3	1	44	Quarter-finals (Wildcard)
7	Jaguares	16	9	0	7	409	418	−9	51	55	2	0	38	Quarter-finals (Wildcard)
8	Sharks	16	7	1	8	437	442	−5	49	57	2	4	36	Quarter-finals (Wildcard)
9	Rebels	16	7	0	9	440	461	−21	57	60	5	3	36	
10	Brumbies	16	7	0	9	393	422	−29	56	52	2	4	34	
11	Stormers	16	6	0	10	390	423	−33	46	56	0	5	29	
12	Bulls	16	6	0	10	441	502	−61	59	66	2	3	29	
13	Reds	16	6	0	10	389	501	−112	49	66	1	3	28	
14	Blues	16	4	0	12	378	509	−131	50	66	2	4	22	
15	Sunwolves	16	3	0	13	404	664	−260	48	99	0	2	14	

Source: Super Rugby

=== Round-by-round ===
The table below shows the Stormers' progression throughout the season. For each round, their cumulative points total is shown with the overall log position:

Team	R1	R2	R3	R4	R5	R6	R7	R8	R9	R10	R11	R12	R13	R14	R15	R16	R17	R18	R19	QF	SF	Final
Opposition	JAG	WAR	CRU	HIG	BLU	RED	BUL	LIO	Bye	SHA	REB	BUL	CHI	SUN	LIO	Bye	JAG	SHA	Bye	—	—	—
Cumulative Points	4	5	5	5	9	13	13	13	13	14	18	22	23	24	25	25	25	29	29	—	—	—
Position (overall)	1st	4th	6th	11th	8th	8th	9th	11th	11th	12th	10th	9th	11th	11th	10th	10th	12th	11th	11th	—	—	—
Position (SA Conf.)	1st	2nd	2nd	4th	2nd	2nd	2nd	3rd	4th	5th	5th	4th	5th	5th	4th	4th	5th	4th	4th	—	—	—
Key:	win	draw	loss	bye																		

== Matches ==
The Stormers played the following matches during the 2018 Super Rugby season:

17 February 2018	Stormers	28–20	Jaguares	DHL Newlands, Cape Town
15:05	Try: Damian de Allende 19'; Siya Kolisi 32'; Raymond Rhule 41'; Con: Damian Willemse 20', 42'; Pen: Damian Willemse 28', 57', 80'; Cards: Ramone Samuels (yellow card) 65' to 75'	Report; Scoreboard	Try: Emiliano Boffelli 46' penalty try 68'; Con: Nicolás Sánchez 47'; Pen: Nicolás Sánchez 5'; Emiliano Boffelli 22'; Cards: Joaquín Tuculet (yellow card) 27' to 37'	Attendance: 18,093; Referee: Jaco Peyper

24 February 2018	Waratahs	34–27	Stormers	Allianz Stadium, Sydney
19:45	Try: Israel Folau 18'; Michael Hooper 29'; Damien Fitzpatrick 43'; Ned Hanigan 80'; Con: Bernard Foley 19', 30', 44', 80'; Pen: Bernard Foley 15', 65'; Cards: Rob Simmons (yellow card) 57' to 67'	Report; Scoreboard	Try: Steven Kitshoff 15'; Kobus van Dyk 36'; SP Marais 51'; Con: SP Marais 17', 37', 52'; Pen: SP Marais 22', 67'	Attendance: 11,700; Referee: Angus Gardner

3 March 2018	Crusaders	45–28	Stormers	AMI Stadium, Christchurch
19:35	Try: George Bridge 7', 40'; Codie Taylor 11'; Billy Harmon 17'; Bryn Hall 19'; Seta Tamanivalu 62'; Richie Mo'unga 69'; Con: Richie Mo'unga 12', 18', 20', 63', 70'; Cards: Billy Harmon (yellow card) 80'	Report; Scoreboard	Try: JC Janse van Rensburg 33'; Wilco Louw 41'; JD Schickerling 54'; Steven Kitshoff 76'; Con: SP Marais 34', 43', 55'; George Whitehead 77'	Referee: Nic Berry

9 March 2018	Highlanders	33–15	Stormers	Forsyth Barr Stadium, Dunedin
19:35	Try: Liam Squire 4'; Aaron Smith 20', 78'; Waisake Naholo 33'; Luke Whitelock 48'; Con: Lima Sopoaga 21', 34', 49', 80'	Report; Scoreboard	Try: Chris van Zyl 11'; Damian Willemse 16'; Con: SP Marais 17'; Pen: SP Marais 32'	Referee: Glen Jackson

17 March 2018	Stormers	37–20	Blues	DHL Newlands, Cape Town
15:05	Try: EW Viljoen 2', 50'; Raymond Rhule 13'; Dewaldt Duvenage 36'; Con: Damian Willemse 3', 15', 36', 51'; Pen: Damian Willemse 30', 65', 72'	Report; Scoreboard	Try: Akira Ioane 46'; Michael Collins 57'; Rieko Ioane 69'; Con: Stephen Perofeta 58'; Pen: Bryn Gatland 17'	Referee: Nic Berry

24 March 2018	Stormers	25–19	Reds	DHL Newlands, Cape Town
17:15	Try: Dewaldt Duvenage 15'; Wilco Louw 26'; Raymond Rhule 53'; Con: Damian Willemse 27', 55'; Pen: Damian Willemse 3', 32'	Report; Scoreboard	Try: Caleb Timu 37'; Alex Mafi 42'; Filipo Daugunu 80'; Con: Jono Lance 38', 42'	Referee: Marius van der Westhuizen

31 March 2018	Bulls	33–23	Stormers	Loftus Versfeld, Pretoria
17:15	Try: Adriaan Strauss 6', 17', 46'; Johnny Kôtze 31'; Jesse Kriel 70'; Con: Handré Pollard 8', 32', 47', 70'; Cards: Lizo Gqoboka (yellow card) 80'	Report; Scoreboard	Try: Jan de Klerk 37'; Damian de Allende 40'; Siya Kolisi 66'; Con: Damian Willemse 40'; Pen: Damian Willemse 15', 24'; Cards: Damian de Allende (yellow card) 16' to 26'; Pieter-Steph du Toit (yellow card) 42' to 52'	Referee: Marius van der Westhuizen

7 April 2018	Lions	52–31	Stormers	Emirates Airline Park, Johannesburg
17:15	Try: Madosh Tambwe 1', 9', 13', 52'; Lionel Mapoe 26'; Kwagga Smith 40'; Franco Mostert 46'; Ruan Combrinck 62'; Con: Elton Jantjies 2', 14', 40', 47', 53', 63'; Cards: Marvin Orie (yellow card) 77'	Report; Scoreboard	Try: Wilco Louw 21'; Damian Willemse 59'; Paul de Wet 73' penalty try 80'; Con: SP Marais 22', 60'; Damian Willemse 73'; Pen: SP Marais 36'	Referee: Jaco Peyper

21 April 2018	Sharks	24–17	Stormers	Kings Park Stadium, Durban
17:15	Try: Lukhanyo Am 42'; Jean-Luc du Preez 64'; Thomas du Toit 73'; Con: Robert du Preez 43', 65', 74'; Pen: Robert du Preez 19'	Report; Scoreboard	Try: Raymond Rhule 39'; Ramone Samuels 52'; Con: Damian Willemse 40', 53'; Pen: Damian Willemse 50'; Cards: Dewaldt Duvenage (yellow card) 59' to 69'	Referee: Glen Jackson

27 April 2018	Stormers	34–18	Rebels	DHL Newlands, Cape Town
19:10	Try: Damian de Allende 16'; JJ Engelbrecht 33', 80'; Dillyn Leyds 44'; Con: Damian Willemse 17', 35', 46', 80'; Pen: Damian Willemse 11', 56'	Report; Scoreboard	Try: Sefa Naivalu 53', 76'; Con: Jack Debreczeni 54'; Pen: Jack Debreczeni 6', 13'	Referee: Ben O'Keeffe

5 May 2018	Stormers	29–17	Bulls	DHL Newlands, Cape Town
15:05	Try: Damian Willemse 5'; Wilco Louw 11'; SP Marais 50'; Ramone Samuels 62'; Con: Damian Willemse 7', 51', 63'; Pen: SP Marais 53'; Cards: Ramone Samuels (yellow card) 33' to 43'	Report; Scoreboard	Try: Lood de Jager 20'; Jason Jenkins 48'; Con: Handré Pollard 21', 49'; Pen: Handré Pollard 34'	Referee: Glen Jackson

12 May 2018	Stormers	9–15	Chiefs	DHL Newlands, Cape Town
15:05	Pen: Damian Willemse 15', 54'; SP Marais 78'	Report; Scoreboard	Try: Anton Lienert-Brown 22' penalty try 67'; Pen: Damian McKenzie 75'	Referee: Mike Fraser

19 May 2018	Sunwolves	26–23	Stormers	Mong Kok Stadium, Hong Kong
13:15	Try: Hayden Parker 24'; Grant Hattingh 57'; Con: Hayden Parker 25', 58'; Pen: Hayden Parker 38', 65', 80'; Drop: Hayden Parker 80'	Report; Scoreboard	Try: Dillyn Leyds 6', 33'; JJ Engelbrecht 21'; Con: Jean-Luc du Plessis 22'; Pen: SP Marais 71', 74'	Referee: Nic Berry

26 May 2018	Stormers	23–26	Lions	DHL Newlands, Cape Town
17:15	Try: Dewaldt Duvenage 4'; Raymond Rhule 30'; Con: Jean-Luc du Plessis 5', 32'; Pen: Jean-Luc du Plessis 19', 67', 71'; Cards: JJ Engelbrecht (yellow card) 37' to 47'; Raymond Rhule (red card) 51'; Jaco Coetzee (yellow card) 60' to 70'	Report; Scoreboard	Try: Nic Groom 21'; Corné Fourie 54', 59'; Madosh Tambwe 76'; Con: Elton Jantjies 22', 61', 77'	Referee: Nick Briant

30 June 2018	Jaguares	25–14	Stormers	José Amalfitani Stadium, Buenos Aires
16:40	Try: Bautista Delguy 12'; Guido Petti 15'; Matías Orlando 41'; Con: Nicolás Sánchez 13', 42'; Pen: Nicolás Sánchez 4', 73'	Report; Scoreboard	Try: Sikhumbuzo Notshe 25'; Dillyn Leyds 60'; Con: Jean-Luc du Plessis 26', 61'	Referee: Angus Gardner

7 July 2018	Stormers	27–16	Sharks	DHL Newlands, Cape Town
17:15	Try: Cobus Wiese 7'; EW Viljoen 30'; Raymond Rhule 37'; Con: Joshua Stander 7', 31', 38'; Pen: Joshua Stander 66', 79'	Report; Scoreboard	Try: Kobus van Wyk 43'; Con: Robert du Preez 44'; Pen: Robert du Preez 5', 10', 19'	Referee: Jaco Peyper

== Player statistics ==
The Super Rugby appearance record for players that represented the Stormers in 2018 is as follows:

2018 Stormers player statistics
Player name	JAG	WAR	CRU	HIG	BLU	RED	BUL	LIO	SHA	REB	BUL	CHI	SUN	LIO	JAG	SHA	QF	SF	F	App	Try	Con	Pen	DG	Pts
Steven Kitshoff	1	1	17 (substituted in)	1	1	17 (substituted in)	1	1	1	1	1	1		17 (substituted in)	1	17 (substituted in)	—	—	—	15	2	0	0	0	10
Ramone Samuels	2	2	2	2	2	2	2	2	2	2	2	2	2	2	16 (substituted in)	16 (substituted in)	—	—	—	16	2	0	0	0	10
Wilco Louw	3	3	3	3	3	3	3	3	3	3	3	3	3	3	3	18 (substituted in)	—	—	—	16	4	0	0	0	20
Chris van Zyl	4	19 (substituted in)		5	5	19 (substituted in)	19 (substituted in)	5	5	4	4	4	4	5			—	—	—	13	1	0	0	0	5
JD Schickerling	5	4	4													19 (substituted in)	—	—	—	4	1	0	0	0	5
Siya Kolisi	6	6	6	6	6	6	6	6	6	6	6	6	20 (substituted in)	6	6		—	—	—	15	2	0	0	0	10
Cobus Wiese	7		7		20 (substituted in)	7	7			19 (substituted in)	19 (substituted in)	19 (substituted in)	6	19 (substituted in)	4	4	—	—	—	12	1	0	0	0	5
Nizaam Carr	8	8	8	8	8	8	8	8	20 (substituted in)	20 (substituted in)	20 (substituted in)	20 (substituted in)	8	20 (substituted in)	21 (substituted in)		—	—	—	15	0	0	0	0	0
Dewaldt Duvenage	9	9	9	9	9	9			9	9	9	9	9	9	9	9	—	—	—	14	3	0	0	0	15
Damian Willemse	10	10		10	10	10	10	10	10	10	10	10					—	—	—	11	3	19	15	0	98
Raymond Rhule	11	11	11	11	11	11	11	11	11		11	11	23 (substituted in)	11	11	11	—	—	—	15	6	0	0	0	30
Damian de Allende	12	12	12	12	12	12	12	12	12	12	12	12	12	12	12	12	—	—	—	16	3	0	0	0	15
EW Viljoen	13	23 (substituted in)	13	13	13	13	13	13	13	13				23	23 (substituted in)	13	—	—	—	12	3	0	0	0	15
Seabelo Senatla	14		14							23 (substituted in)	23	23 (substituted in)	11				—	—	—	5	0	0	0	0	0
Dillyn Leyds	15	14	10	14	15		14	14	15	15	14	14	14	15	15	15	—	—	—	15	4	0	0	0	20
Dean Muir	16 (substituted in)	16 (substituted in)	16 (substituted in)	16 (substituted in)	16 (substituted in)	16 (substituted in)											—	—	—	6	0	0	0	0	0
JC Janse van Rensburg	17 (substituted in)	17 (substituted in)	1	17 (substituted in)	17 (substituted in)	1	17 (substituted in)	17 (substituted in)	17 (substituted in)	17 (substituted in)	17 (substituted in)	17 (substituted in)	1	1	17 (substituted in)	1	—	—	—	16	1	0	0	0	5
Carlü Sadie	18 (substituted in)	18 (substituted in)	18 (substituted in)	18 (substituted in)		18 (substituted in)	18 (substituted in)	18 (substituted in)	18 (substituted in)	18 (substituted in)			17				—	—	—	9	0	0	0	0	0
Jan de Klerk	19 (substituted in)		19 (substituted in)	4	4	4	4	4	4				19 (substituted in)	4	5	5	—	—	—	12	1	0	0	0	5
Kobus van Dyk	20 (substituted in)	7	20 (substituted in)	7		20 (substituted in)	20 (substituted in)	20 (substituted in)	19 (substituted in)	7	7	7	7	7	20 (substituted in)	6	—	—	—	15	1	0	0	0	5
Justin Phillips	21 (substituted in)	21 (substituted in)	22 (substituted in)	21 (substituted in)		22 (substituted in)	9								22 (substituted in)		—	—	—	7	0	0	0	0	0
George Whitehead	22	22 (substituted in)	23 (substituted in)	22		15											—	—	—	3	0	1	0	0	2
JJ Engelbrecht	23	13		23 (substituted in)	14				23 (substituted in)	11	13	13	13	13	13	14	—	—	—	11	3	0	0	0	15
Pieter-Steph du Toit		5	5		7	5	5	7	7	5	5	5	5		7	7	—	—	—	13	0	0	0	0	0
SP Marais		15	15	15			15	15	22 (substituted in)	22 (substituted in)	15	15	15				—	—	—	10	2	9	8	0	52
Sikhumbuzo Notshe		20 (substituted in)	21 (substituted in)	20 (substituted in)		21 (substituted in)	21 (substituted in)	21 (substituted in)	8	8	8	8	21 (substituted in)	8	8	8	—	—	—	14	1	0	0	0	5
Salmaan Moerat				19 (substituted in)	19 (substituted in)										19 (substituted in)		—	—	—	3	0	0	0	0	0
Neethling Fouché					18 (substituted in)												—	—	—	1	0	0	0	0	0
Jaco Coetzee					21 (substituted in)			21 (substituted in)						21 (substituted in)			—	—	—	3	0	0	0	0	0
Paul de Wet					22 (substituted in)			22 (substituted in)	21 (substituted in)	21	21	21 (substituted in)	22 (substituted in)	22 (substituted in)			—	—	—	6	1	0	0	0	5
Craig Barry					23 (substituted in)	14	23 (substituted in)	23 (substituted in)	14	14				14	14	23 (substituted in)	—	—	—	9	0	0	0	0	0
Joshua Stander						23 (substituted in)										10	—	—	—	2	0	3	2	0	12
Scarra Ntubeni							16 (substituted in)	16 (substituted in)	16 (substituted in)	16 (substituted in)	16 (substituted in)	16 (substituted in)	16 (substituted in)				—	—	—	7	0	0	0	0	0
Jano Vermaak							22 (substituted in)	9									—	—	—	2	0	0	0	0	0
Frans Malherbe											18 (substituted in)	18 (substituted in)	18 (substituted in)	18 (substituted in)	18 (substituted in)	3	—	—	—	6	0	0	0	0	0
Jean-Luc du Plessis											22 (substituted in)	22 (substituted in)	10	10	10		—	—	—	5	0	5	3	0	19
Bongi Mbonambi														16 (substituted in)	2	2	—	—	—	3	0	0	0	0	0
Juarno Augustus																20 (substituted in)	—	—	—	1	0	0	0	0	0
Johan du Toit																21 (substituted in)	—	—	—	1	0	0	0	0	0
Herschel Jantjies																22 (substituted in)	—	—	—	1	0	0	0	0	0
penalty try																				–	1	–	–	–	7
Total																				16	46	37	28	0	390

(c) denotes the team captain. For each match, the player's squad number is shown. Starting players are numbered 1 to 15, while the replacements are numbered 16 to 23. If a replacement made an appearance in the match, it is indicated by (substituted in) . "App" refers to the number of appearances made by the player, "Try" to the number of tries scored by the player, "Con" to the number of conversions kicked, "Pen" to the number of penalties kicked, "DG" to the number of drop goals kicked and "Pts" refer to the total number of points scored by the player.

- Stephan de Wit, Daniël du Plessis, Eben Etzebeth, Dan Kriel, Caylib Oosthuizen, Sergeal Petersen, Alistair Vermaak and Eduard Zandberg did not make any appearances.

== See also ==
- Stormers
- 2018 Super Rugby season
