= Louis Schreuder =

South African rugby union player

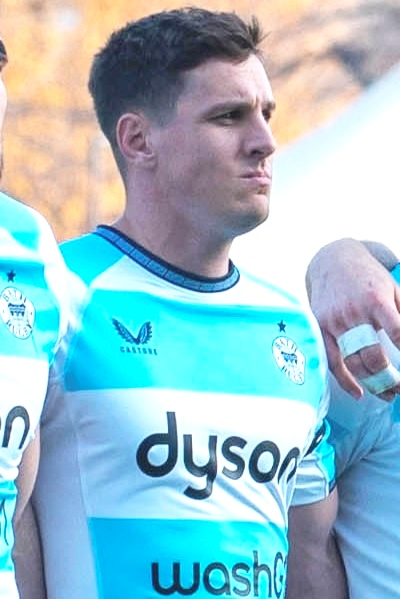
- Schreuder ahead of Bath Rugby's match against Benetton Treviso, December 2024
- Born: 25 April 1990 (age 36) Paarl, South Africa
- Height: 1.84 m (6 ft 1/2 in)
- Weight: 82 kg (181 lb; 12 st 13 lb)
- School: Paarl Gimnasium
- University: Stellenbosch University

Rugby union career
- Position: Scrum-half
Youth career
- 1989–2011: Western Province
Senior career
Years	Team	Apps	(Points)
2010–2016	Western Province	55	(15)
2011–2016	Stormers	66	(10)
2016–2017	Kubota Spears	8	(0)
2017	Southern Kings	14	(5)
2017–2019	Sharks (Currie Cup)	16	(20)
2018–2019	Sharks	33	(5)
2018	Sharks XV	1	(10)
2019-2020	Toulon	7	(0)
2020–2022	Newcastle Falcons	40	(15)
2022–2025	Bath	62	(15)
- Correct as of 25 May 2025
International career
Years	Team	Apps	(Points)
2010	South Africa under-20	5	(0)
2017	South Africa	1	(0)
- Correct as of 5 January 2024

Louis Schreuder (born 25 April 1990) is a South African rugby union player who plays as a scrum-half for Bath in Premiership Rugby.

== Club career ==
Born and raised in the Western Cape, Schreuder came through the ranks at Western Province and made his senior debut against Border during the 2010 Vodacom Cup. Super Rugby caps arrived the following year as he took advantage of injuries to regular scrum-halves Dewaldt Duvenage and Ricky Januarie to earn valuable game time towards the end of the season. Januarie's departure ahead of the 2012 season saw Schreuder become the regular back-up to Duvenage and he made 14 substitute appearances during the campaign. More game time arrived in the 2012 Currie Cup and he earned his first piece of senior rugby silverware as a 68th-minute substitute for Nic Groom as Western Province upset the Sharks 25–18 in Durban to land their 33rd Currie Cup title.

2013 saw Schreuder take his game to a new level and with Dewaldt Duvenage announcing he would join French Top 14 side Perpignan at the conclusion of the 2013 Super Rugby season he saw much more action. He started 6 games and made 4 substitute appearances as himself, Duvenage and Groom were all rotated throughout the campaign. However, come the 2013 Currie Cup he appeared to have established himself ahead of Nic Groom as Province's first-choice scrum-half. He played in all 12 of his side's matches during the season, including 9 starts as the Western Cape outfit reached their 2nd consecutive Currie Cup Final. Schreuder was named in the starting line-up and was substituted in the 52nd minute as the Shark's gained revenge on Western Province with a surprise 33–19 victory at Newlands.

He joined the Southern Kings for the 2017 Super Rugby season.

Schreuder signed for French giants Toulon in the Top 14 as a medical joker during the 2019 Rugby World Cup. Afterwards, Schreuder travels to England to join Newcastle Falcons in the Premiership Rugby from the 2020-21 season.

== International career ==
Schreuder was vice-captain of the South Africa Under 20 team that competed in the 2010 IRB Junior World Championship in Argentina.

An injury crisis during the 2013 Incoming test series meant he received a call-up for the national team, the Springboks on 11 June 2013. He didn't get any game time, but he was again named in the Springbok squad for the 2013 end-of-year test series games against Wales, Scotland and France. Once more Schreuder was unable to earn a slot in the matchday squad but gained valuable experience training alongside fellow scrum-halves Fourie du Preez, Ruan Pienaar and Jano Vermaak.

Schreuder won his first (and to date only) cap for South Africa as a second half replacement in a loss to Wales in 2017.

== Super Rugby statistics ==
As of June 2020

Season	Team	Games	Starts	Sub	Mins	Tries	Points	Yellow card	Red card
2011	Stormers	3	2	1	132	0	0	0	0
2012	Stormers	14	0	14	171	0	0	0	0
2013	Stormers	10	6	4	435	1	5	0	0
2014	Stormers	12	4	8	347	0	0	0	0
2015	Stormers	15	4	11	381	0	0	0	0
2016	Stormers	12	3	9	319	1	5	1	0
2017	Southern Kings	12	12	0	771	1	5	0	0
2018	Sharks	16	12	4	764	1	5	0	0
2019	Sharks	17	16	1	1081	0	0	0	0
2020	Sharks	7	6	1	353	0	0	0	0
Total		118	65	53	4760	4	20	1	0
