= Jacobie Adriaanse =

South African rugby union player

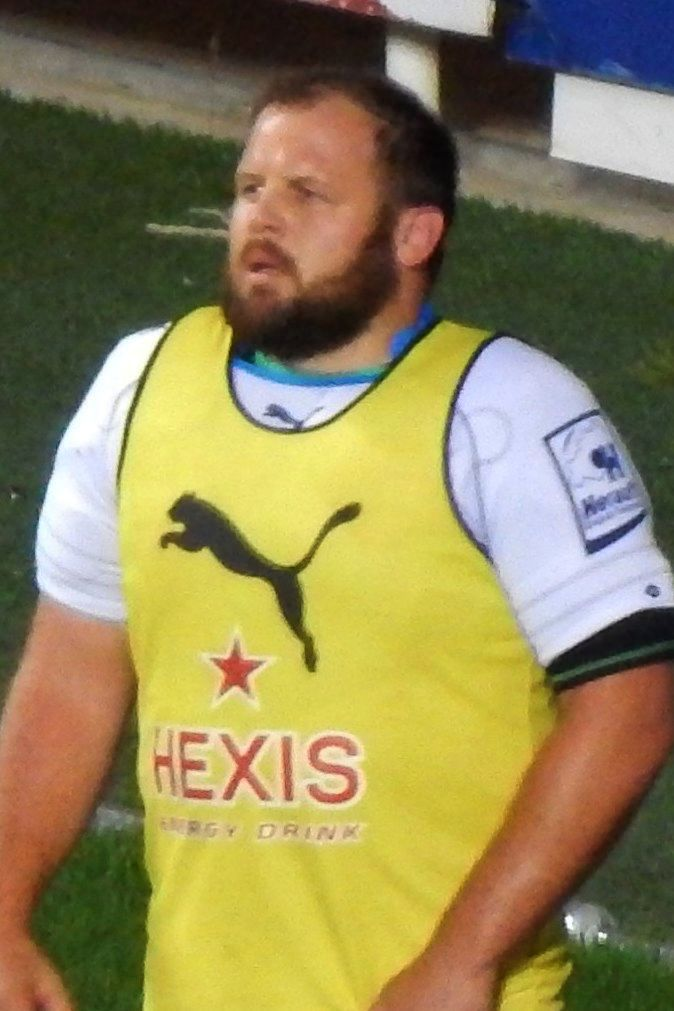
- Full name: Jacobus Petrus Adriaanse
- Born: 19 July 1985 (age 41) Cape Town, South Africa
- Height: 1.78 m (5 ft 10 in)
- Weight: 112 kg (247 lb; 17 st 9 lb)
- School: Paarl Gimnasium, Paarl
- University: Stellenbosch University
- Notable relative: Lourens Adriaanse (brother)

Rugby union career
- Position: Tighthead prop
Youth career
- 1997–2001: Boland Cavaliers
- 2002–2006: Western Province
Amateur team(s)
| Years | Team | Apps | (Points) |
| 2008 | Maties | 8 | (0) |
| 2014–2015 | Llandovery | | |
| 2014–2015 | Carmarthen Quins | | |
Senior career
| Years | Team | Apps | (Points) |
| 2008–2009 | Boland Cavaliers | 23 | (0) |
| 2010 | Griquas | 21 | (5) |
| 2011–2012 | Golden Lions | 24 | (15) |
| 2011–2012 | Golden Lions XV | 9 | (0) |
| 2011–2012 | Lions | 14 | (0) |
| 2012–2015 | Scarlets | 51 | (0) |
| 2015 | Montpellier | 3 | (0) |
| 2016 | Southern Kings | 12 | (0) |
| 2016 | Blue Bulls | 7 | (0) |
| 2017 | Bulls | 7 | (0) |
| 2017 | Blue Bulls XV | 1 | (0) |
| 2017–2019 | Golden Lions | 19 | (0) |
| 2018–2019 | Lions | 13 | (0) |
| 2018–2019 | Golden Lions XV | 7 | (0) |
| 2008–2019 | Total | 211 | (20) |
- Correct as of 8 September 2019
International career
| Years | Team | Apps | (Points) |
| 2003–2004 | South Africa Under-19 | | |
| 2003 | South Africa Schools Academy | 1 | (0) |
| 2008 | Emerging Springboks | 1 | (0) |
- Correct as of 6 April 2018

Jacobus Petrus Adriaanse (born 19 July 1985) is a former South African rugby union player that played first class rugby between 2008 and 2019 and represented the Emerging Springboks internationally. His regular position is tighthead prop.

== Rugby career ==
=== Youth ===
Adriaanse represented Western Cape side Boland at various level throughout his school career, from Under-12 level in 1997 to Under-16 level in 2001. He was included in Western Province's Under-18 Craven Week team that won the main match at the 2002 event in Pietermaritzburg and was also included in a South Africa Under-19 training squad after the tournament.

Adriaanse made the cut for the final South African Under-19 squad that played at the 2003 Under-19 Rugby World Championship held in Paris, despite still being in the Under-18 age group. He helped South Africa win the tournament, beating New Zealand's Under-19 team 22–18 in the final. He returned to South Africa, where he was once again included in Western Province's Under=18 Craven Week squad that played at the 2003 edition held in Wellington. He helped Western Province win the unofficial final of the competition for the second season in a row, and was included in a South African Schools Academy side that was named at the conclusion of the tournament and played one match against a France Under-18 side in Johannesburg.

Adriaanse was again selected in the South African Under-19 training group in 2003 and made the final squad for the 2004 Under-19 Rugby World Championship which took place in Durban. The team couldn't defend their title, losing to New Zealand in the semifinal, but bounced back to beat England in the third-place play-off. In the latter half of 2004, Adriaanse represented Western Province team in the Under-20 Provincial Championship.

=== Maties / Western Province / Emerging Springboks ===
In 2005 and 2006, Adriaanse represented Western Province U21 in the Under-21 Provincial Championship and also played club rugby for Stellenbosch University – also known as Maties – between 2005 and 2008. He was included in a training squad for the South Africa Under-21 team in January 2006, but failed to make the final squad that played at the 2006 Under-21 Rugby World Championship. He was included in the Western Province squad for the 2007 Vodacom Cup competition, but was didn't make any appearances in the competition. In 2008, Adriaanse represented Maties in the inaugural edition of the Varsity Cup. He made eight appearances in the competition, including their semi-final match – where they beat UP Tuks 47–44 – and the final, where Maties was crowned the first champions of the competition by beating Western Cape rivals UCT Ikey Tigers. Once again, Adriaanse was included in the Western Province squad for the Vodacom Cup, but didn't feature in any matches.

However, Adriaanse was included in an Emerging Springboks squad that played in the 2008 IRB Nations Cup held in Romania. He came on as a replacement in their 11–3 victory over Georgia in the Emerging Springboks' first match in the competition, but didn't feature in their other two matches against Italy A or Romania.

=== Boland Cavaliers ===
Adriaanse linked up with Wellington-based side Boland Cavaliers after returning home from the 2008 IRB Nations Cup. He was included in their squad for the 2008 Currie Cup Premier Division and he made his first class debut by coming on as a replacement in a 10–26 defeat to the Blue Bulls on 19 July 2008. He again played off the bench in their next match against Western Province and against Griquas in Round Ten of the competition. He was promoted to the starting line-up for next match, a 19–69 defeat to the Blue Bulls, where he remained for the remaining three matches in the competition. The Boland Cavaliers finished the season in seventh position in the eight-team competition to qualify to a relegation play-off series against First Division champions the Griffons. Adriaanse started their convincing 54–15 victory in the first leg, as well as the second leg, which the Boland Cavaliers lost 42–50, but still retained their Premier League status.

Adriaanse didn't feature for the Boland Cavaliers in the 2009 Vodacom Cup, but firmly established himself as their first choice tighthead prop for the 2009 Currie Cup Premier Division, starting eleven of their fourteen matches in the competition and appearing as a replacement on one occasion. Despite winning their first match of the season against the Leopards, they lost their remaining thirteen matches to finish bottom of the log, once again being required to play in a relegation play-off series. Adriaanse started both legs of the relegation series; despite Boland Cavaliers winning the first leg 36–35 in Wellington, they lost the second leg 3–40 in Witbank to be relegated to the First Division for 2010.

=== Griquas ===
Following the Boland Cavaliers' relegation to the First Division, Adriaanse moved to Kimberley to join Griquas on a one-year contract. Adriaanse made his Griquas debut by starting in their 2010 Vodacom Cup opening round match against the Blue Bulls; this was also his Vodacom Cup debut, despite being included in squads for this competition in the previous three seasons. He helped defending champions Griquas qualify for the title play-offs after finishing in third place in the Northern Section of the competition, but they were eliminated at the quarter-final stage, losing 24–28 to a Sharks XV side. Prior to the 2010 Currie Cup Premier Division, he featured in a compulsory friendly match against the SWD Eagles in George, before making thirteen appearances in the competition proper. He made his Currie Cup debut for Griquas as a replacement in a 40–34 victory over the Sharks and his first start for the side against the Golden Lions a fortnight later. That match also saw Adriaanse score the first try of his career, scoring just after half time to help Griquas to a 26–20 victory. Adriaanse made six starts and seven appearances as a replacement during the competition, as Griquas finished in sixth position on the log.

=== Golden Lions / Lions ===
At the conclusion of his one-year deal with Griquas, Adriaanse was on the move again, joining Johannesburg-based side the Golden Lions prior to the 2011 season. He started the first match of their 2011 Vodacom Cup season against his former side Western Province in an 18–all draw, as well as their next three matches against Argentine side Pampas XV, another former side Boland Cavaliers and the Sharks XV, but was then promoted to their affiliated Super Rugby side, the Lions. He made his Super Rugby debut on 26 March 2011, coming on as a replacement in their 23–30 defeat to trans-Jukskei rivals the Bulls. He also played off the bench against the Reds and the Sharks before starting his first match in the competition, a 19–33 defeat to the Stormers. He reverted to the Vodacom Cup side for their quarter final defeat to the Blue Bulls before returning to the Super Rugby side for four more substitute appearances. Three of those came during their tour of Australasia, playing against the Waratahs, Highlanders, and the Hurricanes and one more against the Sharks after returning to South Africa.

Adriaanse featured in all fourteen of the Golden Lions' matches during the 2011 Currie Cup Premier Division competition, starting the first five, dropping to the replacement bench for their next eight matches and returning to the starting line-up for their final match against the Sharks. The Golden Lions finished top of the log after the round-robin stage, winning ten of their matches. Despite one scoring one try previously in his career, Adriaanse weighed in with three tries – in matches against the Pumas, Leopards and Free State Cheetahs – to help his team qualify for the play-offs. He appeared as a replacement in their 29–20 victory over Western Province in the semi-final, but didn't feature in the final, which the Golden Lions won 42–16 against Sharks to win their first title since 1999.

In 2012, Adriaanse again appeared for both the Lions in Super Rugby and for the Golden Lions in the Vodacom Cup. He made four starts – which included three in a row in their last three matches of the season – and a further two appearances as a replacement in the Super Rugby competition, but his performances wasn't enough to prevent the Lions finish bottom of the log, eventually losing their Super Rugby status to the Southern Kings. He started three Vodacom Cup matches during the regular season to help the Golden Lions finish in the top four of the Northern Section to qualify for the play-offs, and he also started in their quarter final match, which they lost 34–58 to Western Province to be eliminated from the competition. He made eight appearances in the round-robin stage of the 2012 Currie Cup Premier Division in the latter half of the year, but once again tasted play-off defeat to Western Province as the side from Cape Town won 21–16 in the semi-final.

=== Scarlets ===
The semi-final match was Adriaanse's final match in a Golden Lions shirt, as he signed for Welsh Pro12 side Scarlets on a three-year deal. He made his debut for Scarlets by starting in their 18–34 defeat to Worcester Warriors in the First Round of the 2012–13 Anglo-Welsh Cup. He featured in their next match in the same competition a week later against the Cardiff Blues to make his home debut for his new side. On 25 November 2012, he made his first appearance in the 2012–13 Pro12 competition, as he helped the Scarlets get their first-ever victory over Munster at Musgrave Park. He eventually made ten appearances in the competition, culminating in a semi-final appearance against Ulster, which the Scarlets lost 17–28 to be knocked out of the competition. In addition to one more appearance in the Anglo-Welsh Cup, Adriaanse also played in three matches in the 2012–13 Heineken Cup; he debuted in their 16–22 defeat to the Exeter Chiefs and also featured in defeats to Leinster and Clermont as the Scarlets lost all six of their matches in the competition.

Adriaanse again featured in all three competitions during the 2013–14 season. He played in thirteen matches in the 2013–14 Pro12 competition, as the Scarlets could not emulate their records from the previous season, failing to quality for the semi-finals. They had a far better record in the 2013–14 Heineken Cup than the previous season though, winning two and drawing one of their six matches, with Adriaanse appearing in four of those. He also made two appearances during the 2013–14 Anglo-Welsh Cup, with Scarlets winning two of their four matches to fail to quality to the semi-finals.

The 2014–15 season saw him slip down the pecking order in the Scarlets ranks; he made eleven appearances during the 2014–15 Pro12, but only started one of those against Glasgow Warriors. He was used as a replacement on one occasion in the 2014–15 Heineken Cup – in a match against Leicester Tigers – and made two appearances in the 2014–15 Anglo-Welsh Cup. Due to lack of game time for the Scarlets, he also appeared in the Welsh Premier Division, making one appearance for Llandovery and two appearances for Carmarthen Quins.

Adriaanse left Scarlets at the end of the 2014–2015 season, having made 51 appearances for the side, but never scored any tries during his time in Wales.

=== Montpellier ===
Shortly after playing his final match for the Scarlets, it was announced that Adriaanse would join French Top 14 side Montpellier. He signed a short-term deal running until 31 October 2015 to provide cover for the senior team during the 2015 Rugby World Cup. He made three appearances for Montpellier during the 2015–16 Top 14 season, coming on as a replacement in their matches against Bordeaux, Stade Français and Toulon, replacing fellow South African Pat Cilliers on each occasion.

=== Kings ===
Adriaanse returned to South Africa to join the Port Elizabeth-based Southern Kings prior to the 2016 Super Rugby season.

=== Bulls ===
After just one season at the Kings, Adriaanse moved to Pretoria to join the Blue Bulls prior to the 2016 Currie Cup Premier Division season.

== Statistics ==
As of 21 December 2015.

First class career
Total by season
| Season | Teams | Super Rugby | | Currie Cup | | Vodacom Cup | | Heineken Cup | | Pro12 | | Anglo-Welsh Cup | | Top 14 | | Friendly | | Total | |
| Season | Teams | Apps | Pts | Apps | Pts | Apps | Pts | Apps | Pts | Apps | Pts | Apps | Pts | Apps | Pts | Apps | Pts | Apps | Pts |
|---|---|---|---|---|---|---|---|---|---|---|---|---|---|---|---|---|---|---|---|
| 2008 | Boland Cavaliers | — | — | 9 | 0 | — | — | — | — | — | — | — | — | — | — | — | — | 9 | 0 |
| 2009 | Boland Cavaliers | — | — | 14 | 0 | — | — | — | — | — | — | — | — | — | — | — | — | 14 | 0 |
| 2010 | Griquas | — | — | 13 | 5 | 7 | 0 | — | — | — | — | — | — | — | — | 1 | 0 | 21 | 5 |
| 2011 | Lions | 8 | 0 | — | — | — | — | — | — | — | — | — | — | — | — | — | — | 8 | 0 |
| 2011 | Golden Lions | — | — | 15 | 15 | 5 | 0 | — | — | — | — | — | — | — | — | — | — | 20 | 15 |
| 2012 | Lions | 6 | 0 | — | — | — | — | — | — | — | — | — | — | — | — | — | — | 6 | 0 |
| 2012 | Golden Lions | — | — | 9 | 0 | 4 | 0 | — | — | — | — | — | — | — | — | — | — | 13 | 0 |
| 2012–2013 | Scarlets | — | — | — | — | — | — | 3 | 0 | 10 | 0 | 3 | 0 | — | — | — | — | 16 | 0 |
| 2013–2014 | Scarlets | — | — | — | — | — | — | 4 | 0 | 13 | 0 | 2 | 0 | — | — | 1 | 0 | 20 | 0 |
| 2014–2015 | Scarlets | — | — | — | — | — | — | 1 | 0 | 11 | 0 | 2 | 0 | — | — | 1 | 0 | 15 | 0 |
| 2015–2016 | Montpellier | — | — | — | — | — | — | — | — | — | — | — | — | 3 | 0 | — | — | 3 | 0 |
| 2008–present | Career Total | 14 | 0 | 60 | 20 | 16 | 0 | 8 | 0 | 34 | 0 | 7 | 0 | 3 | 0 | 3 | 0 | 145 | 20 |
Total by team
| 2008–2009 | Boland Cavaliers | — | — | 23 | 0 | — | — | — | — | — | — | — | — | — | — | — | — | 23 | 0 |
| 2010 | Griquas | — | — | 13 | 5 | 7 | 0 | — | — | — | — | — | — | — | — | 1 | 0 | 21 | 5 |
| 2011–2012 | Lions | 14 | 0 | — | — | — | — | — | — | — | — | — | — | — | — | — | — | 14 | 0 |
| 2011–2012 | Golden Lions | — | — | 24 | 15 | 5 | 0 | — | — | — | — | — | — | — | — | — | — | 29 | 15 |
| 2012–2015 | Scarlets | — | — | — | — | — | — | 8 | 0 | 34 | 0 | 7 | 0 | — | — | 2 | 0 | 51 | 0 |
| 2015–2016 | Montpellier | — | — | — | — | — | — | — | — | — | — | — | — | 3 | 0 | — | — | 3 | 0 |
| 2008–present | Career Total | 14 | 0 | 60 | 20 | 16 | 0 | 8 | 0 | 34 | 0 | 7 | 0 | 3 | 0 | 3 | 0 | 145 | 20 |

== Personal life ==
Adriaanse is the older brother of South African international prop Lourens Adriaanse.
