= Michael Rhodes (rugby union) =

South African rugby union player

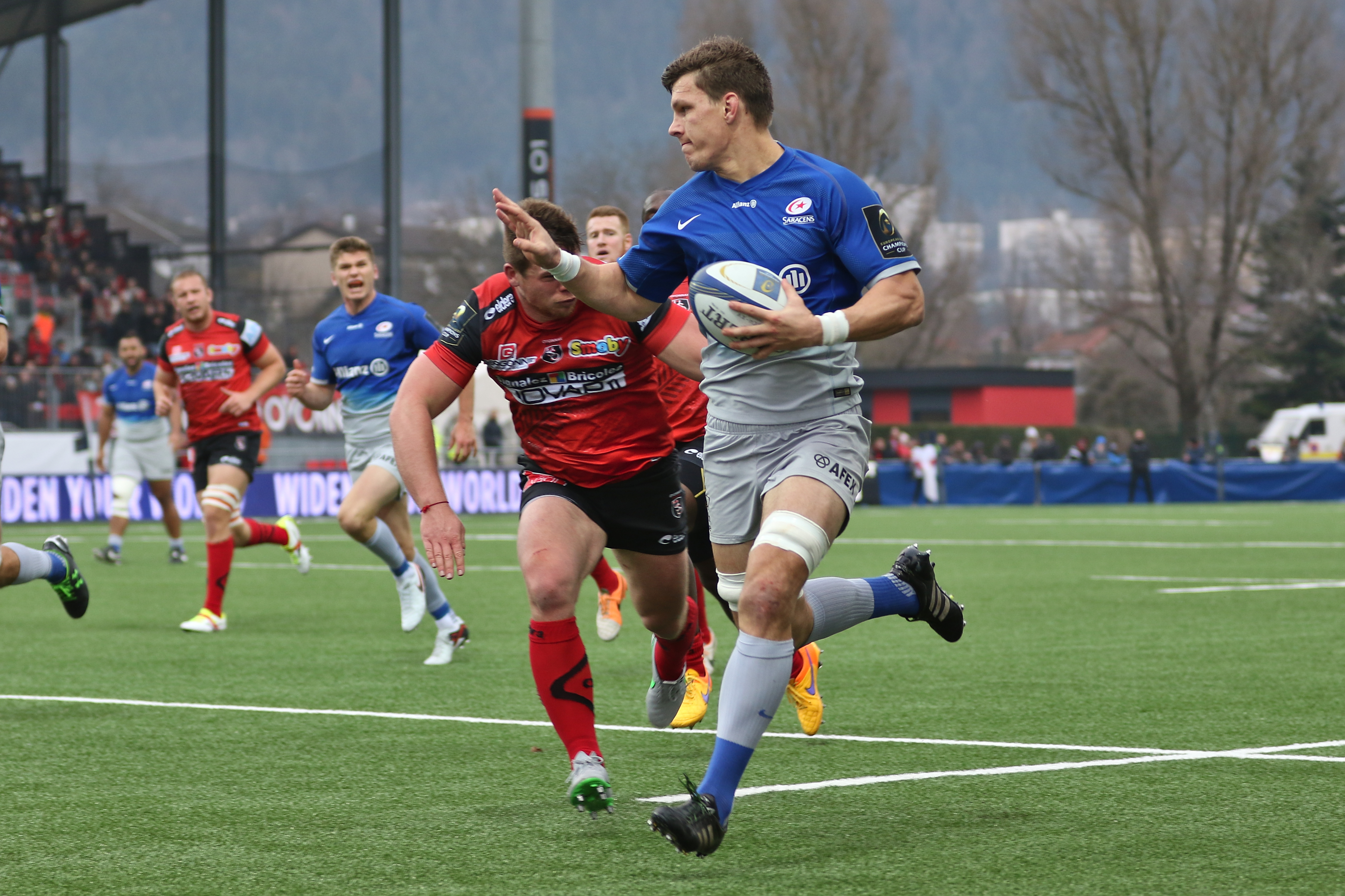
- Born: Michael Kenworthy Rhodes; 19 December 1987 (age 38) Durban, South Africa
- Height: 1.97 m (6 ft 5 1/2 in)
- Weight: 114 kg (17 st 13 lb; 251 lb)
- School: Michaelhouse
- University: UNISA

Rugby union career
- Position: Flanker
Senior career
Years	Team	Apps	(Points)
2010-2011	Sharks	7	(5)
2011–2012	Lions	11	(10)
2013–2015	Stormers	26	(10)
2015–2021	Saracens	106	(40)
Provincial / State sides
Years	Team	Apps	(Points)
2008–2010	Natal Sharks	39	(35)
2011–2012	Golden Lions	22	(25)
2013–2015	Western Province	22	(25)
International career
Years	Team	Apps	(Points)
2014	Barbarians	1	(5)

Michael Kenworthy Rhodes (born 19 December 1987 in Durban, South Africa) is a rugby union footballer who formerly played for English Premiership side Saracens. He played as a flanker, but had been occasionally used as a lock.

== Club career ==
=== Sharks ===
Rhodes played for theSharks for two seasons, winning the 2008 and 2010 Currie Cup with the provincial side and featuring in the game against British and Irish Lions, when they toured South Africa in 2009.

=== Lions ===
Rhodes signed up for the Golden Lions along with Sharks teammate Pat Cilliers at the end of the 2010 season. Rhodes featured occasionally for the Super Rugby side this season but spent much of the season turning out for the provincial side. Rhodes went on to win his third Currie Cup, playing for the provincial Golden Lions.

=== Stormers ===
He joined the Stormers for the 2013 Super Rugby season. In September 2013 Rhodes received a red card for a stamp on Blue Bulls captain Jono Ross. Coincidentally it was the second time that weekend a player had been expelled for stamping with Nick Wood also being sent off. Citing lack of intent in the action the disciplinary panel only suspended Rhodes for a match. Two years earlier Rhodes had faced harsher discipline after he put Siale Piutau in a headlock and the latter responded with multiple punches. Neither player was disciplined during the game but the panel suspended both for six weeks for their actions. Rhodes helped the provincial Western Province to their 2014 Currie Cup win, to win the trophy for the fourth time. After a stellar year, Rhodes was voted most promising forward at the annual Western Province Awards in 2014.

Rhodes played regularly for Stormers during the 2015 season, helping them finish top of the South African Conference. Rhodes started at 6 as Stormers lost to Brumbies in the qualifiers for the 2015 Super Rugby finals.

=== Saracens ===
Michael Rhodes joined Saracens from Stormers for the 2015–16. Rhodes quickly became established as Saracens' first choice 6 and a fan favourite and went on to help Saracens win the double of the Aviva Premiership and the European Champions Cup for the first time in Saracens' history. Rhodes featured in 27 games in the 2015–2016 season including starting the Champions Cup and Premiership finals and scored tries against Sale Sharks and in the Champions Cup Semi-final against Wasps. Rhodes was rewarded with his impressive debut season by being offered a contract extension to keep him at the club until 2019.

Rhodes was once again an integral part of the Saracens side that went on to win the 2016–17 European Rugby Champions Cup, and started in the final. Rhodes also started in the 2016–17 Premiership semi-final loss to Exeter Chiefs. Rhodes came off in the semi-final for what would be a long-term shoulder injury. Rhodes was awarded for his hard work and ruthlessness this season by being voted as the Saracens' Players' Player of the Year and being shortlisted for the Premiership Player of the Season.

Rhodes recovered from his shoulder injury in time to start the 2017–18 Premiership Rugby season. Rhodes was however plagued with injuries during this season, with recurring issues with his shoulder following surgery. He came off the bench in both the semi-final and final of the Premiership for Nick Isiekwe. His Saracens side went on to beat Exeter Chiefs for Rhodes to win his second Premiership trophy.

During the 2018–19 Premiership season Rhodes reclaimed his place in the number 6 shirt and was as industrious as ever. On 13 March 2019, Rhodes received a three game ban for dangerous play on Miles Reid during Saracens' 18-9 loss to Bath Rugby. Rhodes returned to the side and was key to the Saracens path to the 2018–19 European Rugby Champions Cup final, including scoring a try in the semi-final win over Munster Rugby. Rhodes was ruled out of the final due to back spasms, but Saracens still went on to win their third Champions Cup in four years. Rhodes returned to the side on the bench for Premiership semi-final at home to Gloucester and the final against Exeter Chiefs, which Saracens went on to win 37-34.

In the coronavirus-affected 2019-20 Premiership season, Rhodes played a reduced role for the Saracens team which was relegated to the RFU Championship due to persistent breaches of the salary cap. He did however feature in the quarter-final victory over Leinster and semi-final defeat to Racing 92 in the 2019-20 European Champions Cup, starting in both at 6.

Rhodes was amongst the players confirmed by Saracens to be staying with the club for the 2020-21 Championship Season, despite relegation. He went on to receive his 100th Saracens cap in the pre-season Trailfinders Challenge Cup. Saracens went on to finish second in the league and beat Ealing Trailfinders 117-15 in the two-legged final. Before the final, it was announced that Rhodes would be leaving the club at the end of the season. In his final appearance in the second-leg of the final, Rhodes was sent off for a dangerous tackle and received a four week suspension.

== International career ==
=== Barbarians ===
Rhodes was a part of the Barbarians side to face Leicester Tigers for their 125th Anniversary on 4 November 2014. Rhodes started at 6 and scored a try in the 26–59 thumping of the Tigers.

=== England ===
After qualifying to play for England Rugby through 3 years of residency, Rhodes was called up to Eddie Jones 44-man squad ahead of the 2018 end-of-year rugby union internationals. Rhodes was retained in the training squad for several weeks but was not selected to make an appearance, with Mark Wilson and Brad Shields preferred to him at 6.

== Super Rugby statistics ==
As of 21 June 2015

Season	Team	Games	Starts	Sub	Mins	Tries	Cons	Pens	Drops	Points	Yel	Red
2011	Lions	9	5	4	461	2	0	0	0	10	0	0
2013	Stormers	3	3	0	201	1	0	0	0	5	0	0
2014	Stormers	14	12	2	998	0	0	0	0	0	1	0
2015	Stormers	9	6	3	480	1	0	0	0	5	0	0
Total		35	26	9	2140	4	0	0	0	20	1	0

== Honours ==
Natal Sharks

- Currie Cup (2): 2008, 2010

Golden Lions

- Currie Cup (1): 2011

Stormers

- Super Rugby South African Conference (1): 2015

Western Province

- Currie Cup (1): 2014

Saracens

- Aviva Premiership (3): 2015–16, 2017–18, 2018–19
- European Champions Cup (3): 2015–16, 2016–17, 2018-19
- RFU Championship (1): 2020-21

Individual

- Western Province Most Promising Forward: 2014
- Saracens Players' Player of the Year: 2016-17
- Shortlist for Premiership Player of the Year: 2016-17
