= Rudi Vogt =

South African rugby union player

- Full name: Rudi Vogt
- Born: 30 January 1983 (age 43) Paarl, South Africa
- Height: 1.92 m (6 ft 3 1/2 in)
- Weight: 92 kg (14 st 7 lb; 203 lb)
- School: Overberg High School

Rugby union career
- Position: Utility Back
Senior career
Years	Team	Apps	(Points)
2007–2009	Pumas	26	(198)
2008	Lions	5	(0)
2009–2010	Oyonnax	21	(41)
2010–2012	Griquas	36	(339)
- Correct as of 1 November 2013
International career
Years	Team	Apps	(Points)
2008	Emerging Springboks		
- Correct as of 1 November 2013

Rudi Vogt (born 30 January 1983) is a former South African rugby union footballer, who played as a full-back, fly-half and wing. He played for the Pumas in the domestic Currie Cup and Vodacom Cup competitions between 2007 and 2009, for the French Rugby Pro D2 side Oyonnax in 2009–10 and for Griquas from 2010 to 2012. He also made five Super Rugby appearances for the Lions during the 2008 Super 14 season and played for the Emerging Springboks at the 2008 IRB Nations Cup.

Although still contracted to Griquas in 2013, he missed the 2012 Currie Cup Premier Division and the entire 2013 seasons with a hip injury, which culminated in his retirement after the 2013 Currie Cup season.
