= Nic Groom =

South African rugby union player

- Full name: Nicholas James Groom
- Born: 21 February 1990 (age 36) King William's Town, South Africa
- Height: 1.71 m (5 ft 7 1/2 in)
- Weight: 81 kg (12 st 11 lb; 179 lb)
- School: Rondebosch Boys' High School
- University: University of Cape Town

Rugby union career
- Position: Scrum-half
- Current team: Edinburgh
Youth career
- 2008–2011: Western Province
Amateur team(s)
Years	Team	Apps	(Points)
2010–2011	UCT Ikey Tigers	8	(5)
Senior career
Years	Team	Apps	(Points)
2011–2015	Western Province	69	(50)
2011–2016	Stormers	57	(25)
2016–2018	Northampton Saints	49	(35)
2018–2019	Lions	21	(15)
2018	Golden Lions	4	(5)
2019–2021	Edinburgh	22	(25)
2021	London Irish	4	(0)
2021	Tel Aviv Heat	0	(0)
- Correct as of 4 February 2022
International career
Years	Team	Apps	(Points)
2015	Barbarians	1	(0)
2016	South Africa 'A'	1	(0)
- Correct as of 27 May 2018

Nicholas James Groom (born 22 February 1990) is a South African rugby union player. He plays as a scrum-half.

== Career ==
A winner of the Varsity Cup with UCT in 2011, Groom received a swift call up to the Stormers side at the tail-end of the Super Rugby season to replace the injured Dewaldt Duvenhage and Ricky Januarie and he made a couple of substitute appearances. The next 18 months were to see him limited to Western Province appearances and he was a Currie Cup winner with the Streeptruie in 2012. 2013 saw the departure of Duvenhage and Groom was now in a one-on-one fight with Louis Schreuder for the Stormers and Province number 9 jersey and as a result he saw much more game time. He was a Currie Cup runner up in 2013 and he largely had to make do with appearances from the substitutes bench as Schreuder stole a march in the battle to be first choice scrum-half. However, he was to become a Currie Cup winner again in 2014, this time against the Golden Lions in a season which had seen him edge ahead of Louis Schreuder both at Super Rugby level where he started 12 of 16 games in a tough campaign and also domestically where he started 7 of 9 games and scored 1 try in the process.

He signed a contract to join English Premiership side Northampton Saints at the end of the 2016 Super Rugby season and has since become a regular started for the Midlands side.

Groom has been a regular feature in the Saints' starting side and was instrumental in them securing European Champions Cup rugby for the 2017/18 season, featuring heavily in both the European Champions Cup play-off games where Saints saw off both Connacht Rugby and Stade Français Paris to secure their spot in the competition for the following season. On 3 April 2018, it was announced that Groom would leave Northampton with immediate effect to join the Super Rugby team the Lions.

On 27 June 2019, Groom returned to the UK with Pro14 side Edinburgh in Scotland from the 2019–20 season. He was released on 22 April 2021 and subsequently signed for Premiership Rugby team London Irish until the end of the 2020–21 season.

== International rugby ==
On 28 May 2016, Groom was included in a 31-man South Africa squad for their three-test match series against a touring Ireland team. After training with the national team for a few days, he joined the South Africa 'A' squad for their two-match series against a touring England Saxons team. He was named in the starting line-up for their first match in Bloemfontein, but ended on the losing side as the visitors ran out 32–24 winners.

== Super Rugby statistics ==
As of 9 June 2020

Season	Team	Games	Starts	Sub	Mins	Tries	Points	Yellow card	Red card
2011	Stormers	2	0	2	35	0	0	0	0
2012	Stormers	0							
2013	Stormers	9	4	5	371	1	5	0	0
2014	Stormers	16	12	4	924	0	0	0	0
2015	Stormers	16	13	3	955	2	10	1	0
2016	Stormers	14	10	4	765	2	10	0	0
2017	In Europe with Northampton Saints								
2018	Lions	8	5	3	315	2	10	0	0
2019	Lions	13	7	6	579	1	5	0	0
Total		78	51	27	3949	8	40	1	0
