= Russell Winter (rugby union) =

South African rugby union coach and former player

- Born: Russell George Winter; August 17, 1975 (age 51) Johannesburg
- Height: 1.93 m (6 ft 4 in)
- Weight: 100 kg (15 st 10 lb; 220 lb)

Rugby union career
- Position: Back-row
Senior career
Years	Team	Apps	(Points)
1998–2006	Golden Lions		
2006–09	Newcastle Falcons	50	(10)
Super Rugby
Years	Team	Apps	(Points)
2001–03	Cats		
2004	→ Sharks	11	(0)
2005–06	Cats	1	(0)
International career
Years	Team	Apps	(Points)
- South Africa A
National sevens team
Years	Team		Comps
1998	South Africa Sevens		2
Coaching career
- Years: Team
- 2009–15: Golden Lions
- 2016–: Western Province

Russell Winter (born 17 August 1975 in Johannesburg, South Africa) is a former rugby union player and currently a forwards coach. Winter mainly played as a number eight.

He represented the Golden Lions in the South African domestic Currie Cup and Vodacom Cup competitions between 1998 and 2006 and also played for their Super Rugby side, the Cats, between 2001 and 2003, as well as in 2006. He spent the 2004 Super 12 season with Durban-based side the Sharks.

He represented the South African Sevens side on two occasions – at the 1998 Hong Kong Sevens and the 1998 Commonwealth Games and was included in a South Africa A squad that toured Europe in 2001.

He joined English Premiership side Newcastle Falcons in 2006 and made 50 appearances for them before leaving at the end of the 2009 season.

He returned to Johannesburg to take up a coaching role at the Golden Lions, where he was in charge of the Golden Lions U21s and their Vodacom Cup side between 2011 and 2015.

After the 2015 season, it was announced that he would become the forwards coach of Western Province and the Stormers.
