= Alwyn Hollenbach =

South African rugby union player

- Full name: Alwyn Wilhelm Cornelius Johannes Hollenbach
- Born: 14 June 1985 (age 41) Johannesburg, South Africa
- Height: 1.89 m (6 ft 2 1/2 in)
- Weight: 99 kg (218 lb; 15 st 8 lb)
- School: Grey College, Bloemfontein, Bloemfontein
- University: University of the Free State

Rugby union career
- Position: Centre
- Current team: Golden Lions
Youth career
- 2004–2005: Free State Cheetahs
Senior career
Years	Team	Apps	(Points)
2005–2009	Free State Cheetahs	41	(55)
2006–2007	Cheetahs	2	(0)
2008	→ Griquas	2	(0)
2009–2015	Golden Lions	56	(55)
2010–2015	Lions	25	(10)
2005–2015	Total	126	(120)
- Correct as of 8 June 2015
International career
Years	Team	Apps	(Points)
2004	South Africa Under-19		

Alwyn Wilhelm Cornelius Johannes Hollenbach (born 14 June 1985) is a former South African rugby union footballer that mostly played as a centre. He represented the Free State Cheetahs between 2005 and 2009, also making two appearances for their affiliated Super Rugby side the Cheetahs and playing two games for Griquas. In 2009, he moved to Johannesburg to play for the Golden Lions. He made 56 appearances for them and a further 25 for the Lions in Super Rugby.

He retired from rugby during the 2015 season.
