= Nick Fenton-Wells =

South African rugby union player

- Born: Nicholas Sean Fenton-Wells; 11 August 1986 (age 40) Cape Town, South Africa
- Height: 1.86 m (6 ft 1 in)
- Weight: 102 kg (16 st 1 lb; 225 lb)
- School: Diocesan College
- University: UNISA, UCT , DUBS

Rugby union career
- Position(s): Flanker, Hooker
Senior career
| Years | Team | Apps | (Points) |
| 2011–2012 | Stormers | 2 | (0) |
| 2012–2013 | Saracens | 8 | (0) |
| 2013–2016 | Bedford Blues | 53 | (35) |
| 2016–2019 | Bristol Bears | 42 | (25) |
- Correct as of 7 Jun 2012
Provincial / State sides
| Years | Team | Apps | (Points) |
| 2011–2012 | Western Province | 18 | (25) |
- Correct as of 28 May 2012
Super Rugby
| Years | Team | Apps | (Points) |
| 2012 | Stormers | 2 | (0) |
- Correct as of 28 May 2012

Nick Fenton-Wells (born 11 August 1986) is a South African former rugby union footballer and nephew of former Springbok and Italy head coach, Nick Mallett. He played as a Flanker for the Bristol Bears in Premiership Rugby, for Stormers in Super Rugby and Western Province in the Currie Cup and Vodacom Cup as well as previously representing the Ikey Tigers in the Varsity Cup.

He agreed to join Saracens in July 2012. On 7 May 2014, Fenton-Wells sign a permanent deal with RFU Championship side Bedford Blues after joining them on loan from Saracens.

In April 2016 he agreed to join Championship play off rivals Bristol for the 2016 season.

In December 2017 he played his first game for Bristol in his new position of Hooker, having transitioned from the back row.
