= Lourens Adriaanse =

South African rugby union footballer

- Full name: Lourens Cornelius Adriaanse
- Born: 5 February 1988 (age 38) Cape Town, South Africa
- Height: 1.80 m (5 ft 11 in)
- Weight: 115 kg (18 st 2 lb; 254 lb)
- School: Paarl Gimnasium
- University: Stellenbosch University
- Notable relative: Jacobie Adriaanse (brother)

Rugby union career
- Position: Tighthead Prop
Youth career
- 2004–2009: Western Province
Amateur team(s)
Years	Team	Apps	(Points)
2009–2010	Maties	16	(0)
Senior career
Years	Team	Apps	(Points)
2011–2013	Griquas	37	(15)
2011–2013	Cheetahs	30	(0)
2014–2017	Sharks	62	(5)
2014–2016	Sharks (Currie Cup)	14	(15)
2017	Sharks XV	1	(0)
2017–2021	Pau	89	(23)
2021–2022	Sharks (Currie Cup)	15	(0)
2021–2022	Sharks	3	(0)
- Correct as of 23 July 2022
International career
Years	Team	Apps	(Points)
2009	South Africa Students	2	(0)
2013, 2016	South Africa	6	(0)
2014	Barbarians	2	(0)
2016	Springbok XV	1	(0)
- Correct as of 26 November 2016

Lourens Cornelius Adriaanse (born 5 February 1988) is a South African rugby union rugby player who plays as a tighthead prop for Sharks in the South African Currie Cup.

== Career ==
Adriaanse was born in Cape Town and has played in the Western Province youth teams. He represented Maties in the Varsity Cup in 2009 and 2010, before moving to the Griquas for the 2011 season. His domestic performances saw a quick elevation to the Cheetahs Super Rugby team and he debuted in a match against the Reds in Brisbane.

Adriaanse joined the Sharks for the start of the 2014 season. He was included in their squad for the 2014 Super Rugby season and made his debut for the Sharks in a 31–16 victory against the Bulls in Durban.

Adriaanse joined Pau on a three-year deal prior to the 2017–18 season.

== International ==
Adriaanse was called up to the South Africa squad for the 2013 mid-year rugby union tests against Italy, Scotland and Samoa, but he didn't play in any of the matches. He finally made his Springbok debut in a test against France on 23 November 2013 in Paris.

== Personal life ==
Adriaanse is the younger brother of prop Jacobie Adriaanse.
