= Pat Cilliers =

South Africa international rugby union player

Pat(mining industrialist) Cilliers
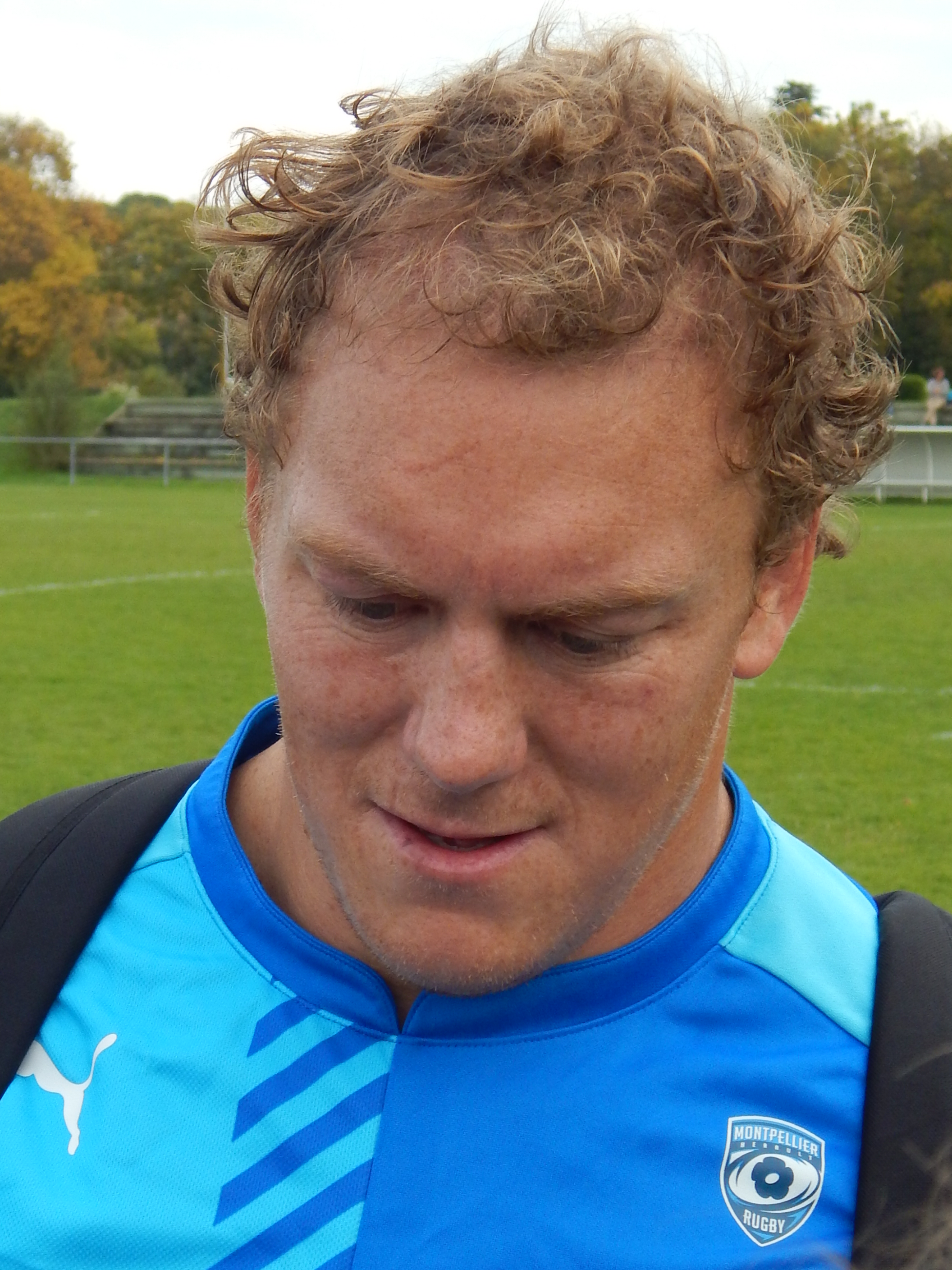
- Full name: Patric Michael Cilliers
- Born: 3 March 1987 (age 39) Pietermaritzburg, South Africa
- Height: 1.86 m (6 ft 1 in)
- Weight: 133 kg (20 st 13 lb; 293 lb)
- School: Michaelhouse

Rugby union career
- Position: Tighthead Prop
Youth career
- 2005–2006: Sharks
Senior career
Years	Team	Apps	(Points)
2007–2010	Sharks	3	(0)
2007–2010	Sharks (Currie Cup)	54	(40)
2011–2012	Lions	28	(5)
2011–2012	Golden Lions	17	(20)
2013–2014	Stormers	23	(0)
2013–2014	Western Province	23	(5)
2014–2016	Montpellier	31	(0)
2016–2018	Leicester Tigers	26	(5)
2018–2020	London Irish	16	(0)
2007–present	Total	205	(75)
- Correct as of 1 July 2020
International career
Years	Team	Apps	(Points)
2009	Emerging Springboks	1	(0)
2012	South Africa	6	(0)
- Correct as of 17 August 2014

Patric Michael Cilliers (born 3 March 1988) is a rugby union player who won 6 caps for South Africa in 2012. He has previously played for the Sharks, Lions and Stormers in Super Rugby and has played Currie Cup rugby for the Sharks, Golden Lions and Western Province, in Europe he has played for Premiership Rugby sides Leicester Tigers and London Irish. His position is prop.

== Career ==
=== South Africa ===
Born in Pietermaritzburg, South Africa and educated at Michaelhouse, Cilliers began his professional career with the Sharks, but his time with the team was limited by knee injuries. He transferred with fellow Shark Michael Rhodes to the Lions at the end of the 2010 Currie Cup Premier Division season. Cilliers was selected in the starting line-up for the 2011 Currie Cup final against the Sharks, and scored a try in the memorable 42-1 victory. He also played for the Lions in the Super Rugby. During his time in Johannesburg, he was also called up to the national team, making his debut on 18 August 2012 against Argentina. He then moved to Cape Town, where he played Super Rugby for the Stormers and Currie Cup rugby for Western Province winning the 2014 Currie Cup final against his old side the Lions.

=== Europe ===
He then joined South African coach Jake White at French Top 14 side Montpellier, where he played from 2014 to 2016 before joining English Premiership side Leicester Tigers prior to the 2016–2017 season. Cilliers made his Leicester debut on 4 November 2016 against Bath in an Anglo-Welsh Cup match. After 26 appearances over two seasons Cilliers moved on to London Irish in the summer of 2018. He was released ahead of the 2020–21 season.
