= Michael Haley =

Michael Haley may refer to:

- Michael Haley (rugby league) (born 1987), English rugby league footballer
- Mike Haley (rugby union) (born 1994), Irish rugby union footballer
- Michael Haley (soldier), officer in the South Carolina National Guard and husband of South Carolina governor Nikki Haley
- Mick Haley, American volleyball coach

== See also ==
- Micheal Haley (born 1986), Canadian ice hockey forward
- Michael Healey, Canadian playwright and actor
- Mike Hayley, British actor, comedian, impressionist and writer
