= JJ Engelbrecht =

South African rugby union player

- Full name: Johannes Jacobus Engelbrecht
- Born: 22 February 1989 (age 37) Port Elizabeth, South Africa
- Height: 1.91 m (6 ft 3 in)
- Weight: 99 kg (15 st 8 lb; 218 lb)
- School: Grey High School
- University: Stellenbosch University

Rugby union career
- Position: Outside Centre / Wing
Youth career
- 2007: Eastern Province Kings
- 2008–2010: Western Province
Amateur team(s)
Years	Team	Apps	(Points)
2009	Maties	2	(15)
Senior career
Years	Team	Apps	(Points)
2008–2011	Western Province	38	(120)
2011	Stormers	0	(0)
2012–2015	Bulls	65	(45)
2012–2015	Blue Bulls	15	(0)
2015–2018	Toyota Industries Shuttles	21	(35)
2016	Ospreys	4	(0)
2018–2019	Stormers	20	(15)
2018	Western Province	5	(10)
2019	Clermont	1	(0)
2020	Sunwolves	5	(0)
- Correct as of 2 February 2022
International career
Years	Team	Apps	(Points)
2012–2013	South Africa	12	(20)
2015	World XV	1	(0)
- Correct as of 18 November 2013

Johannes Jacobus Engelbrecht (born 22 February 1989) is a former South African professional rugby union player who played as a wing or outside centre.

== Rugby career ==
=== Youth ===
Engelbrecht attended Grey High School in the Eastern Cape until 2007, where he also played rugby for their first XV rugby team, alongside fellow future professional Tim Whitehead. He also earned a call-up to represent Eastern Province at the premium high school rugby union competition – the Under-18 Craven Week – held in Stellenbosch in 2007.

=== Western Province / Blue Bulls ===
After finishing high school, Engelbrecht moved to Cape Town to join the Western Province academy. He represented them in the domestic Currie Cup and Vodacom Cup competitions between 2009 and 2011, before joining teammates Johann Sadie and Lionel Cronjé in making the move to Pretoria to join the Blue Bulls ahead of the 2012 season. He established himself in the Bulls Super Rugby team during the 2012 Super Rugby season, scoring three tries in seventeen appearances in the competition. He broke into the national team and signed a contract extension in June 2013 to keep him at the Blue Bulls until 2016.

=== Toyota Industries Shuttles ===
After the 2015 Super Rugby season, Engelbrecht joined Japanese Top League side Toyota Industries Shuttles for the 2015–2016 season.

=== Ospreys ===
In January 2016, the Bulls released him from his contract to join Welsh Pro12 side Ospreys for the remainder of the 2016–2017 season.

=== Representative rugby ===
Engelbrecht made his debut for South Africa on 18 August 2012 against Argentina, coming on as a 70th-minute substitute. He made a further eleven appearances for the Springboks during 2013 and was offered a core contract by the Springboks for 2014, but failed to feature in any matches for the national team.

Engelbrecht also missed out on selection for the 2015 Rugby World Cup, but did play in a match for a World XV against a South Africa XV in a warm-up match prior to the tournament.
