= Johann Sadie =

South African rugby union player

- Born: 23 January 1989 (age 37) Malmesbury, South Africa
- Height: 1.88 m (6 ft 2 in)
- Weight: 96 kg (15 st 2 lb; 212 lb)
- School: Paarl Gimnasium
- University: Stellenbosch University

Rugby union career
- Position: Centre
- Current team: Agen
Youth career
- 2005–2010: Western Province
Amateur team(s)
Years	Team	Apps	(Points)
2009	Maties	3	(8)
Senior career
Years	Team	Apps	(Points)
2010–2011	Western Province	24	(60)
2011	Stormers	6	(10)
2012	Bulls	10	(0)
2012	Blue Bulls	3	(0)
2013–2015	Cheetahs	41	(40)
2013	Free State Cheetahs	11	(15)
2014–2015	NTT DoCoMo Red Hurricanes	10	(0)
2015–present	Agen	88	(80)
- Correct as of 25 April 2015
International career
Years	Team	Apps	(Points)
2009	South Africa Under-20	4	(5)
- Correct as of 29 July 2013

Johann Sadie (born 23 January 1989 in Malmesbury, South Africa) is a professional South African rugby union player. He usually plays as a centre and currently plays for French Top 14 side Agen.

== Rugby career ==
=== Stormers / Western Province ===
Sadie started off his career playing for Western Province in 2010, however stiff competition from Springboks' Jean de Villiers, Jaque Fourie and Juan de Jongh in his chosen position meant that he moved.

=== Bulls / Blue Bulls ===
He joined the Bulls for the 2012 Super Rugby season. His time in Pretoria was not a happy one and he only managed 10 Super Rugby appearances and 3 games in the Currie Cup.

=== Cheetahs / Free State Cheetahs ===
He joined the Cheetahs after the 2012 Currie Cup Premier Division and made an instant impact in Bloemfontein scoring 5 tries during the 2013 Super Rugby season.

=== Agen ===
After the 2015 Super Rugby season, he joined French Top 14 side Agen on a two-year deal.

== International ==
Sadie represented South Africa U20 at the 2009 IRB Junior World Championship in Japan scoring 1 try in 4 matches.
