= Jano Vermaak =

South African rugby union player

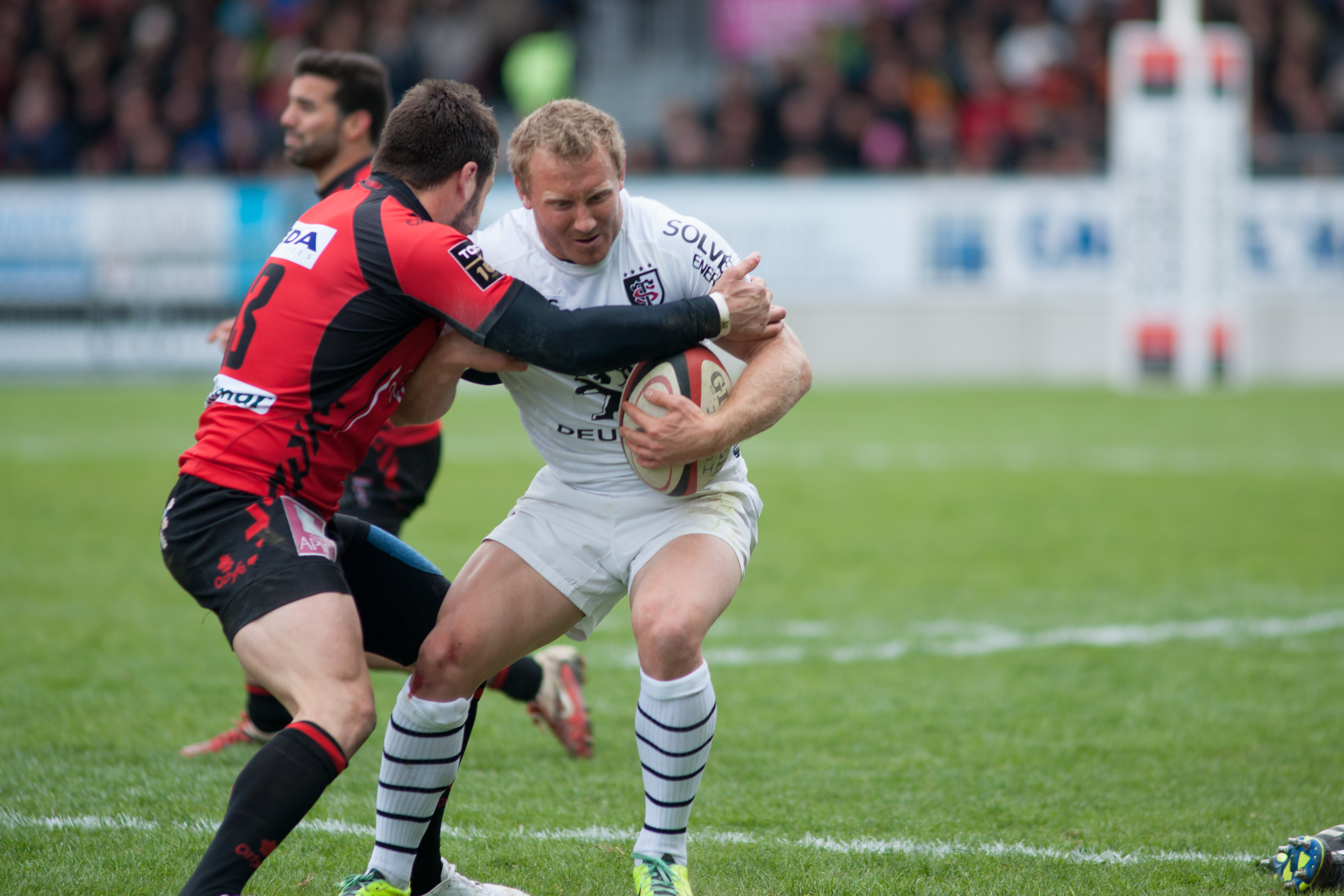
- Born: 1 January 1985 (age 41) Graaff-Reinet, South Africa
- Height: 1.75 m (5 ft 9 in)
- Weight: 81 kg (12 st 11 lb; 179 lb)
- School: HTS Vereeniging
- University: University of Johannesburg

Rugby union career
- Position: Scrum-half
- Current team: Stormers / Western Province
Youth career
- 2003: Falcons
- 2004: Golden Lions
Senior career
Years	Team	Apps	(Points)
2005–2010	Golden Lions XV	7	(5)
2005–2011	Golden Lions	74	(118)
2006	Cats	11	(5)
2007–2011	Lions	62	(68)
2011–2012	Blue Bulls	15	(25)
2012–2013	Bulls	31	(30)
2013–2015	Toulouse	33	(25)
2015–present	Western Province	34	(25)
2016–present	Stormers	22	(5)
- Correct as of 7 July 2019
International career
Years	Team	Apps	(Points)
2005	South Africa Sevens		
2006	South Africa Under-21	5	(10)
2007–2009	Emerging Springboks	4	(10)
2012–2013	South Africa	3	(0)
2017	South Africa 'A'	2	(2)
- Correct as of 18 April 2018

Jano Vermaak (born 1 January 1985) is a South African rugby union player He plays as a scrum half for the {Stormers} in Super Rugby and {Western Province} in the Currie Cup. Vermaak previously represented the Lions and Bulls in Super Rugby and the Golden Lions and Blue Bulls in the domestic Currie Cup competition and Toulouse in the French Top 14.

He made his debut for the Springboks against Italy on 8 June 2013 at Kings Park Stadium in Durban, playing at scrum-half.
