= Dewaldt Duvenage =

South African rugby union footballer

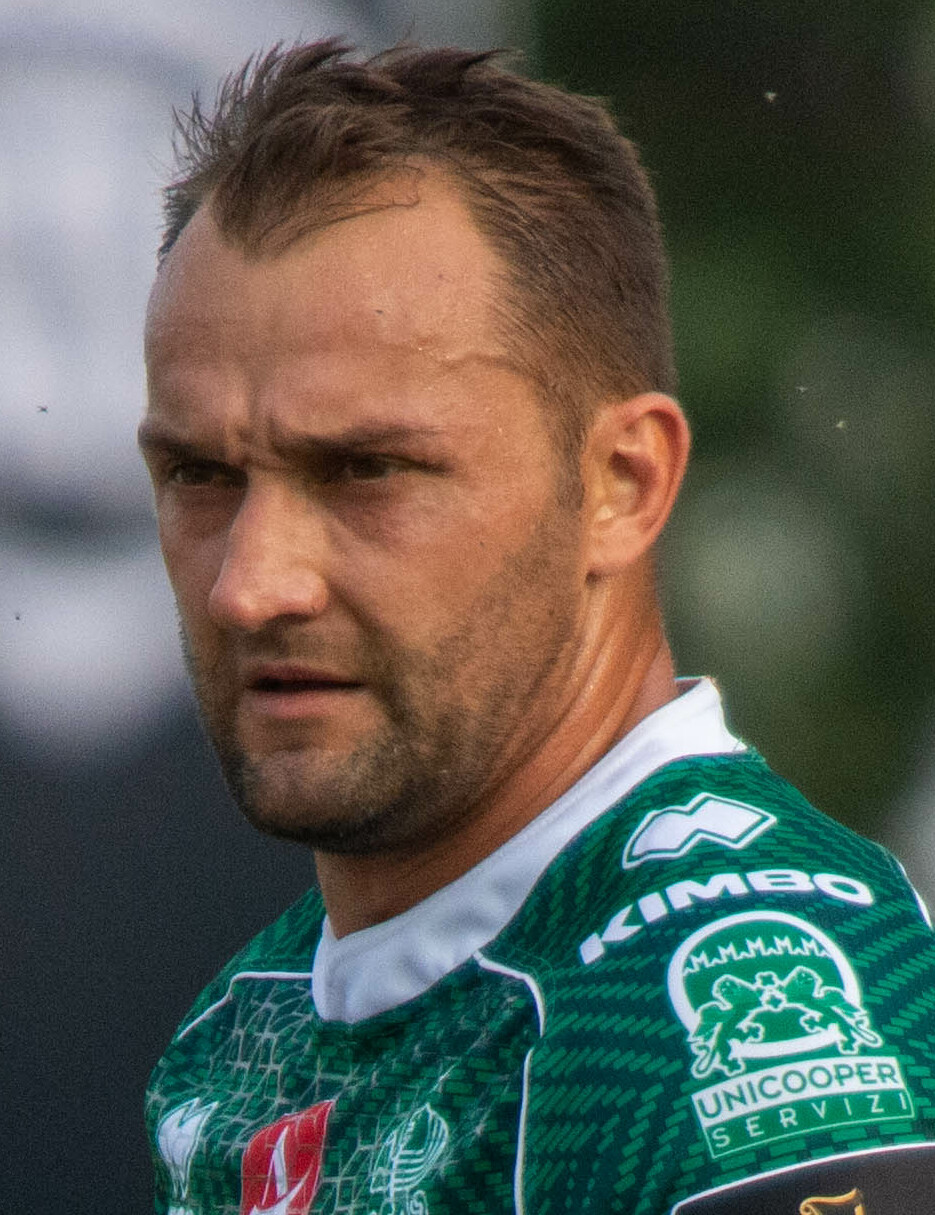
- Full name: Dewaldt Otto Duvenage
- Born: 22 May 1988 (age 38) Bellville, South Africa
- Height: 1.73 m (5 ft 8 in)
- Weight: 84 kg (13 st 3 lb; 185 lb)
- School: Paarl Gimnasium
- University: University of South Africa

Rugby union career
- Position: Scrum-Half
- Current team: Stormers
Youth career
- 2004–2006: Western Province
Senior career
| Years | Team | Apps | (Points) |
| 2007–2008 | Boland Cavaliers | 24 | (15) |
| 2008–2013 | Western Province | 43 | (27) |
| 2009–2013 | Stormers | 67 | (30) |
| 2013–2016 | Perpignan | 72 | (46) |
| 2016–2018 | Western Province | 16 | (10) |
| 2016–2018 | Stormers | 26 | (25) |
| 2018–2024 | Benetton | 97 | (42) |
| 2024–2025 | Western Province | 5 | (0) |
| 2024–2026 | Stormers | 13 | (0) |
- Correct as of 9 Oct 2022
International career
| Years | Team | Apps | (Points) |
| 2008 | South Africa U20 | 4 | (0) |
| 2017 | South Africa 'A' | 2 | (0) |
- Correct as of 18 Apr 2018
Coaching career
- Years: Team
- 2023−2024: Benetton (assistant coach)

Dewaldt Otto Duvenage (born 22 May 1988) is a South African rugby union footballer. He played as a scrum-half for Western Province in the Currie Cup.

He signed a deal to join French Top 14 side Perpignan in 2013. He had a spell playing for Perpignan in the French Top 14 from 2013 to 2016.

He joined Benetton prior to the 2018–19 Pro14 season and he played for Treviso until 2023–24 United Rugby Championship season.

In 2008 he played for South Africa U20 and in 2017 for South Africa 'A'.

In 2023−24 season he was named also Assistant Coach for Benetton.
