= South Africa A national rugby union team =

South Africa A
- Union: SA Rugby
- Nickname(s): SA A South Africa A Springboks 2nds Springboks XV; Emerging Springboks
- Emblem: Springbok
- Coach: Mzwandile Stick (2026)
- Captain: Vincent Tshituka (2026)
- Most caps: Joseph Dweba (4); Jean-Luc du Preez (4); Thomas du Toit (4); Sanele Nohamba (4) (Modern era)
- Top scorer: Yaqeen Ahmed (11) (Modern era)
- Most tries: Aphelele Fassi (2) (Modern era)
Team kit	Change kit

First international
- (South Africa) SA 'A 42-00 Argentina (July 16, 1932)

Largest win
- (South Africa) SA 'A 40-00 Zimbabwe (20 June 2026) (Modern era)

Largest defeat
- (South Africa) SA 'A 14-28 Munster (Republic of Ireland) (10 Nov 2022) (Modern era)

South Africa 'A' are the second national rugby union team representing South Africa, below the senior national team, the Springboks. The South Africa 'A side was formerly known as the Junior Springboks or the Emerging Springboks until 2018, it was also under the South Africa Under-20 team in the country's rugby hierarchy, but World Rugby changed its regulations to prohibit unions from designating an U20 team as its second 15-a-side team.

== History ==
They competed in the Nations Cup in 2007 and 2008 alongside the full national teams of Namibia, Romania and Georgia as well as Argentina Jaguars and Italy A. They also sporadically play touring sides such as the British and Irish Lions.

The team is made up of players of all ages and is not a youth side. It is used most recently to give potential Springboks a taste of international rugby or to give experienced Springboks playing time to improve fitness or form.

== Modern era ==
In the professional era, South Africa 'A has operated as a secondary national side that is assembled on an occasional basis rather than competing in a regular competition. The team is used by the South African Rugby Union to provide playing opportunities for a wider group of players within the national system, including uncapped players and established Springboks returning from injury or seeking match fitness.

Since the 2010s, appearances by South Africa 'A have been relatively infrequent, with squads selected primarily for specific tours or matches against visiting international teams and professional clubs. One of the most notable recent uses of the side came during the 2021 British & Irish Lions tour, when a South Africa 'A team featuring a large number of Test players defeated the British & Irish Lions in Cape Town.

== Results ==
=== 2026 ===
20 November 2026
12:00 SAST

South Africa 'A	40-00	Zimbabwe
Try: Ahmed 16' c Muller 20' c Pead 30' c Steyn 55' c Khan 67' c Williams 81' m Con: Ahmed (3/3) 17', 21', 31'; Giliomee (2/3) 56', 67'; Cards: Ahmed (red card) 54'	Report

Nelson Mandela Bay Stadium, Gqeberha, South Africa
Referee: Aimee Barrett-Theron , (South Africa)

=== 2022 ===
17 November 2022
19:30 GMT

Bristol Bears	28-14	South Africa 'A
Try: Ibitoye 31' c Thomas 57' c Con: Sheedy (2/2) 32', 58'; Pen: Sheedy (4/4) 15', 24', 51', 66'	Report	Try: Mchunu 47' m Notshe 77' c Con: Goosen (1/2) 78'; Pen: Mngomezulu 2', 19'; Cards: Jenkins (yellow card) 22'

Ashton Gate Stadium, Bristol, England
Referee: Gianluca Gnecch

10 November 2022
19:30 GMT

Munster	28-14	South Africa 'A
Try: Daly 2' c Zebo 28' c Barron 38' c Haley 42' c Con: Healy (4/4) 3', 30', 39', 43'; Cards: O'Connor (yellow card) 59'	Report	Try: Fassi 12' c Notshe 60' c Con: Goosen (2/2) 13', 60'

Páirc Uí Chaoimh, Cork, Ireland
Referee: Karl Dickson

=== 2021 ===
17 July 2021
13:00 SAST (UTC+02)

South Africa 'A	14-17	Blue Bulls
Try: Fassi 11' c Simelane 37' c Con: Jantjies (2/2) 11', 39'; Cards: Simelane (yellow card) 17'	Report	Try: Johannes 65' c Grobbelaar 67' c Con: Goosen (2/2) 66', 68'; Pen: Smith (1/1) 75'

DHL Stadium, Cape Town, South Africa
Referee: Marius van der Westhuizenr (South Africa)

14 July 2021
20:00 SAST (UTC+02)

South Africa 'A	17-13	British & Irish Lions
Try: Nkosi 12' c Am 31' c Con: Steyn (2/2) 14', 33'; Pen: Steyn (1/1) 6'; Cards: van Staden (yellow card) 39' de Klerk (yellow card) 41'	Report	Try: Jones 43' c Con: Farrell (1/1) 44'; Pen: Farrell (2/2) 27', 51'

Cape Town Stadium, Cape Town, South Africa
Referee: Jaco Peyper (South Africa)

=== 2017 ===
23 June 2017

South Africa A	48-28	French Barbarians
Try: Gelant 1' c, 80'; Cloete 19' c, 41' c Nche 30' c Mapoe 51' c Con: Zeilinga (5/5) 2', 20', 31', 42', 52'; Vermaak (1/1) 81'; Pen: Zeilinga (2); Cards: Botha (red card) 38'	Report	Try: Dupont 4' c Estebanez 27' c Tauleigne 55' c Dupichot 78' c Con: Michalak (3/3) 5', 28', 56'; Belleau (1/1) 79'; Cards: Dubié (yellow card) 40'

Orlando Stadium, Soweto, South Africa
Referee: Jaco van Heerden (South Africa)

16 June 2017

South Africa A	36-28	French Barbarians
Try: Mvovo (2); Mapimpi; Notshe; Vorster (2)	Report

Moses Mabhida, Durban, South Africa

=== 2016 ===
17 June 2016
19:10 SAST (UTC+02)

South Africa A	26–29	England A
Try: Du Preez 8' m Petersen (2) 39' c, 42' c Venter 45' c Con: Brummer (2/3) 40', 46'; Zas (1/1) 43'	Report	Try: Taylor (2) 35' m, 47' c Kvesic 55' c Wade 74' c Con: Cipriani (3/4) 49', 56', 75'; Pen: Cipriani (1/1) 29'

Outeniqua Park, George
Referee: Jaco van Heerden (South Africa)

10 June 2016
19:10 SAST (UTC+02)

South Africa A	24–32	England A
Try: Brummer 49' c Van Zyl 63' c Notshe 70' c Con: Brummer (3/3) 47', 63', 71'; Pen: April (1/1) 9'	Report	Try: Hepburn 15' c Rokoduguni 29' c Robson 32' m Devoto 77' c Con: Cipriani (3/4) 17', 30', 78'; Pen: Cipriani (2/2) 24', 54'

Free State Stadium, Bloemfontein
Attendance: 10,265
Referee: Rasta Rasivhenge (South Africa)

=== 2009 ===
23 June 2009
19:10

South Africa A	13–13	British & Irish Lions
Try: Demas 80' c Con: De Waal (1/1); Pen: Rose (2/4) 37', 49'	Report	Try: Earls 15' c Con: O'Gara (1/1); Pen: O'Gara (1/2) 8'; Hook (1/1) 77'

Newlands Stadium, Cape Town
Attendance: 39,418
Referee: Alain Rolland (Ireland)

=== 2008 ===
20 June 2008
20:00 EET (UTC+02)

South Africa A	25–13	Romania
Try: Basson 27' c Noble 51' c Jenneker 77' m Con: Newman (2/3); Pen: Newman (2/2) 22', 38'	Report; Stats	Try: Corodeanu 26' c Con: Dimofte (1/1); Pen: Dumbravă (1/1) 2'; Dimofte (1/1) 33'

Stadionul Arcul de Triumf, Bucharest
Referee: Alan Falzone (Italy)

15 June 2008
18:00 EET (UTC+02)

Italy A	19–20	South Africa A
Try: Sbaraglini 78' c Con: Duca (1/1); Pen: Buso (4/4) 42', 47', 54', 63'	Report; Stats	Try: Waka 30' c Jansen 50' c Con: Dollie (2/2); Pen: Dollie (2/2) 2', 64'

Stadionul Arcul de Triumf, Bucharest
Referee: Jérôme Garces (France)

11 June 2008
18:00 EET (UTC+02)

South Africa A	11–3	Georgia
Try: Noble 49' m Pen: Dollie (2/2) 27', 46'	Report; Stats	Pen: Barkalaia (1/1) 37'

Stadionul Arcul de Triumf, Bucharest
Referee: Alan Falzone (Italy)

=== 2007 ===
16 June 2007
19:00 EET (UTC+02)

South Africa A	24 – 10	Argentina XV
Try: Chavhanga (2); Con: Grant (1); Pen: Grant (3); Drop: Grant (1)	Report	Try: D Stuart; Con: Fernández (1); Pen: Fernández (1)

Stadionul Arcul de Triumf, Bucharest

10 June 2007
17:00 EET (UTC+02)

South Africa A	24 – 7	Georgia
Try: Delport (3); Con: Grant (3); Pen: Grant (1)	Stats	Try: Penalty Try; Con: Kvirikashvili (1)

Stadionul Arcul de Triumf, Bucharest
Referee: C Damasco (Italy)

5 June 2007
19:00 EET (UTC+02)

South Africa A	61 – 7	Romania
Try: Brits (2); Chavhanga; Floors (2); Joubert; Vermaak (2); Con: Grant (6); Pen: Grant (3)	Stats	Try: Petre; Con: Vlaicu

Stadionul Arcul de Triumf, Bucharest
Referee: M Fox (England)

== Current squad ==
South Africa A squad to face Zimbabwe as part of the 2026 curtain-raiser for the Springboks vs. Barbarians match in Gqeberha.

2026 South Africa 'A' Lineup
Props: Boan Venter; Neethling Fouche; Oliver Reid; Hanro Jacobs; Hookers: Siphosethu Mnebelele; Liam van Wyk; Locks: Vincent Tshituka (c); Ruben van Heerden; Adré Smith	Loose forwards: Emmanuel Tshituka; Batho Hlekani; Phepsi Buthelezi; Siba Mahashe; Scrum-halves: Haashim Pead; Imad Khan; Fly-halves: Yaqeen Ahmed; Nico Steyn	Centres: Lukhanyo Am; Markus Muller; Jurenzo Julius; Wingers: Zekhethelo Siyaya; Jaco Williams; Fullbacks: Luan Giliomee

== Previous squads ==
2021 South Africa 'A' squad
Props: Thomas du Toit; Lizo Gqoboka; Steven Kitshoff; Vincent Koch; Wilco Louw; Trevor Nyakane; Coenie Oosthuizen; Hookers: Joseph Dweba; Malcolm Marx; Fez Mbatha; Locks: Jean-Luc du Preez; Rynhardt Elstadt; Eben Etzebeth; Franco Mostert	Loose forwards: Pieter-Steph du Toit; Nico Janse van Rensburg; Kwagga Smith; Marco van Staden; Jasper Wiese; Scrum-halves: Faf de Klerk; Herschel Jantjies; Sanele Nohamba; Cobus Reinach; Fly-halves: Elton Jantjies; Morné Steyn	Centres: Lukhanyo Am; Damian de Allende; Jesse Kriel; Wandisile Simelane; Wingers: Cheslin Kolbe; Sbu Nkosi; Yaw Penxe; Rosko Specman; Fullbacks: Aphelele Fassi; Willie le Roux; Damian Willemse

== See also ==
- South African Barbarians
- South Africa President's XV
