= 2014 Currie Cup First Division =

Domestic rugby union competition

- Countries: South Africa
- Date: 29 August – 17 October 2014
- Champions: Griffons (2nd title)
- Runners-up: Falcons
- Matches played: 18
- Tries scored: 136 (average 7.6 per match)
- Top point scorer: Elric van Vuuren (88)
- Top try scorer: Tertius Maarman (5)

The 2014 Currie Cup First Division was contested between 29 August and 17 October 2014. The tournament (also known as the Absa Currie Cup First Division for sponsorship reasons) was the second tier of South Africa's premier domestic rugby union competition, featuring teams representing either entire provinces or substantial regions within provinces.

== Competition ==
There were six participating teams in the 2014 Currie Cup First Division. A proposed expansion of the Premier Division to eight teams was initially rejected, but was then subsequently approved on 13 February 2014. This meant that the First Division was reduced to six teams for 2014.

=== Regular season and title playoffs ===
The six teams played each other twice over the course of the season, once at home and once away. The first series of fixtures were played as part of the 2014 Currie Cup qualification competition, with all results carried forward to the First Division except for the match against the 2014 Currie Cup Premier Division qualifier. A second set of fixtures then followed between the remaining six teams.

Each team received four points for a win and two points for a draw. Bonus points were awarded to teams that scored 4 or more tries in a game, as well as to teams that lost a match by 7 points or less. Teams were ranked by points, then points difference (points scored less points conceded).

The top 4 teams qualified for the title play-offs. In the semifinals, the team that finished first had home advantage against the team that finished fourth, while the team that finished second had home advantage against the team that finished third. The winners of these semi-finals played each other in the final, at the home venue of the higher-placed team.

=== Promotion ===
All the teams qualified for the 2015 Currie Cup qualification series, since Griquas, a non-entrenched team, finished in the bottom two of the 2014 Currie Cup Premier Division.

== Teams ==
Location of teams in the 2014 Currie Cup First Division

The six participating teams were:

2014 Currie Cup First Division teams
Team	Sponsored Name	Stadium/s	Sponsored Name
Boland Cavaliers	Regent Boland Cavaliers	Boland Stadium, Wellington	Boland Stadium
Border Bulldogs	Border Bulldogs	Buffalo City Stadium, East London	Buffalo City Stadium
Falcons	Falcons	Barnard Stadium, Kempton Park	Barnard Stadium
Griffons	Down Touch Griffons	North West Stadium, Welkom	North West Stadium
Leopards	Leopards	Olën Park, Potchefstroom	Profert Olën Park
SWD Eagles	SWD Eagles	Outeniqua Park, George	Outeniqua Park

== Log ==
The final log of the round-robin stage of the 2014 Currie Cup First Division was:

2014 Currie Cup First Division log
Pos	Team	Pld	W	D	L	PF	PA	PD	TF	TA	TB	LB	Pts	Qualification
1	Leopards	10	8	0	2	514	254	+260	75	32	9	1	42	Semi-finals
2	Griffons	10	6	0	4	314	330	−16	41	44	7	1	32	Semi-finals
3	SWD Eagles	10	6	0	4	296	317	−21	38	39	5	1	30	Semi-finals
4	Falcons	10	5	0	5	303	323	−20	40	43	5	1	26	Semi-finals
5	Boland Cavaliers	10	4	0	6	275	278	−3	36	37	6	3	25	
6	Border Bulldogs	10	1	0	9	211	411	−200	27	62	2	2	8	

Rules for classification: 4 points for a win; 2 points for a draw; 1 bonus point for a loss by seven points or less; 1 bonus point for scoring four or more tries in a match.
All teams will qualify to 2015 Currie Cup qualification.

The teams' playing records from the 2014 Currie Cup qualification series brought forward to the First Division are as follows:

Playing records brought forward
Pos	Team	Pld	W	D	L	PF	PA	PD	TF	TA	TB	LB	Pts
1	Leopards	5	5	0	0	324	108	+216	47	13	5	0	25
2	Griffons	5	3	0	2	159	170	−11	21	23	4	1	17
3	SWD Eagles	5	3	0	2	151	188	−37	21	24	3	0	15
4	Boland Cavaliers	5	2	0	3	137	135	+2	17	18	2	2	12
5	Falcons	5	2	0	3	168	183	−15	22	25	2	0	10
6	Border Bulldogs	5	0	0	5	113	268	−155	15	40	1	1	2

== Fixtures and results ==
All the results from the 2014 Currie Cup qualification tournament were carried forward into the First Division season. The results against the 2014 Currie Cup Premier Division qualifier were discarded.

=== Round Eight ===
29 August 2014	Border Bulldogs	19–14	Falcons	Buffalo City Stadium, East London
18:00	Try: Lindani Ndlela 35'; Mihlali Mpafi 49'; Con: Masixole Banda (0/2); Pen: Masixole Banda 10', 12', 21' (3/6); Cards: Yanga Xakalashe (yellow card) 72'	Report; Scoreboard	Try: Kyle Hendricks 43'; JP Mostert 74'; Con: Jaun Kotzé 44', 75' (2/2); Cards: Andrew van Tonder (yellow card) 18' to 28'; Willie Odendaal (yellow card) 49' to 58'	Attendance: 250; Referee: Stuart Berry

29 August 2014	SWD Eagles	29–21	Leopards	Outeniqua Park, George
19:00	Try: Martin du Toit 36'; Alshaun Bock 51'; Con: Elric van Vuuren 37', 52' (2/2); Pen: Elric van Vuuren 13', 26', 61', 64', 69' (5/5); Cards: Shaun Raubenheimer (yellow card) 42' to 52'; Daniel Roberts (yellow card) 57' to 68'	Report; Scoreboard	Try: Morné Hanekom 11', 44'; Con: André Pretorius 45' (1/2); Pen: André Pretorius 21', 35', 54' (3/3)	Referee: Pro Legoete

30 August 2014	Boland Cavaliers	19–27	Griffons	Boland Stadium, Wellington
16:00	Try: Richard Lawson 3'; Zandré Jordaan 26'; Clemen Lewis 66'; Con: Morné Hugo 4' (1/2); Eric Zana 67' (1/1); Pen: Morné Hugo (0/1)	Report; Scoreboard	Try: Boela Abrahams 20'; Norman Nelson 32'; Frans Sisita 50'; Con: Louis Strydom 21', 33', 51' (3/3); Pen: Louis Strydom 43' (1/3); Franna du Toit 80' (1/1); Cards: Frans Sisita (yellow card) 15' to 25'	Attendance: 520; Referee: Lourens van der Merwe

=== Round Nine ===
6 September 2014	Leopards	54–32	Boland Cavaliers	Olën Park, Potchefstroom
15:00	Try: George Tossel 6', 50'; Hoffmann Maritz 22', 32', 40'; Johan Deysel 52', 74'; Jacques Vermaak 65'; Con: André Pretorius 7', 33', 40', 51', 53', 66', 75' (7/8); Cards: Rhyk Welgemoed (yellow card) 79'	Report; Scoreboard	Try: Richard Lawson 13'; Jovelian de Koker 36'; Strand Kruger 63'; Christian Rust 70'; Con: Morné Hugo 14' (1/2); Eric Zana 64', 71' (2/2); Pen: Morné Hugo 10', 30' (2/4)	Referee: Federico Anselmi

6 September 2014	Falcons	24–19	SWD Eagles	Barnard Stadium, Kempton Park
16:00	Try: Coert Cronjé 70'; Bruce Muller 74'; Con: Jaun Kotzé 75' (1/2); Pen: Jaun Kotzé 12', 39', 47', 55' (4/4)	Report; Scoreboard	Try: Alshaun Bock 23'; Con: Elric van Vuuren 24' (1/1); Pen: Elric van Vuuren 3', 19', 50', 63' (4/4); Cards: Peet van der Walt (yellow card) 21' to 31'	Referee: Rasta Rasivhenge

6 September 2014	Griffons	37–32	Border Bulldogs	North West Stadium, Welkom
15:00	Try: Japie Nel 1', 54'; Aubrey McDonald 10'; Nicky Steyn 40'; Joe van der Hoogt 71'; Con: Louis Strydom 2', 40' (2/4); Franna du Toit 72' (1/1); Pen: Louis Strydom 35', 42' (2/2); Cards: Japie Nel (yellow card) 75'	Report; Scoreboard	Try: Lithabile Mgwadleka 24'; Masixole Banda 31'; Lundi Ralarala 50'; Rynardt van Wyk 68'; Con: Hansie Graaff 25' (1/2); Masixole Banda 31', 51' (2/2); Pen: Masixole Banda 8' (1/1); Hansie Graaff 39' (1/2)	Referee: Marius Jonker

=== Round Ten ===
12 September 2014	SWD Eagles	31–22	Border Bulldogs	Outeniqua Park, George
19:00	Try: Alshaun Bock 10'; Daniel Roberts 23', 63'; Buran Parks 29'; Dwayne Kelly 38'; Con: Elric van Vuuren 24', 30', 39' (3/5); Pen: Elric van Vuuren (0/1); Drop: Alshaun Bock (0/1); Cards: Ashley Buys (yellow card) 75'	Report; Scoreboard	Try: Lithabile Mgwadleka 14'; Makazole Mapimpi 32'; Lundi Ralarala 42'; Con: Masixole Banda 15', 33' (2/3); Pen: Masixole Banda 61' (1/3)	Referee: Lourens van der Merwe

13 September 2014	Griffons	37–31	Leopards	North West Stadium, Welkom
14:00	Try: Boela Abrahams 8', 42'; Vuyo Mbotho 28'; Aubrey McDonald 77'; Wynand Pienaar 83'; Con: Louis Strydom 29' (1/3); Franna du Toit 78', 84' (2/2); Pen: Louis Strydom 7' (1/1); Franna du Toit 70' (1/1)	Report; Scoreboard	Try: Rhyk Welgemoed 20'; Johan Deysel 49'; Sylvian Mahuza 59'; HP Swart 64'; Con: André Pretorius 21', 50', 60', 65' (4/4); Pen: André Pretorius 62' (1/2)	Referee: Marius van der Westhuizen

13 September 2014	Boland Cavaliers	25–32	Falcons	Boland Stadium, Wellington
16:00	Try: Albert Trytsman 23'; Eric Zana 31', 73'; Strand Kruger 58'; Con: Morné Hugo 24' (1/2); Eric Zana (0/2); Pen: Morné Hugo 10' (1/1); Cards: Eric Zana (yellow card) 18' to 28'	Report; Scoreboard	Try: Jacques Verwey 5' penalty try 18'; Kyle Hendricks 20', 34'; Bruce Muller 78'; Con: Jaun Kotzé 6', 19' (2/4); Kyle Hendricks (0/1); Pen: Jaun Kotzé 28' (1/1)	Attendance: 450; Referee: Pro Legoete

=== Round Eleven ===
Abandoned after 58 minutes	19 September 2014	Border Bulldogs	19–34	Leopards	Buffalo City Stadium, East London
	17:00	Try: Rynardt van Wyk 13', 39'; Makazole Mapimpi 55'; Con: Masixole Banda 14', 40' (2/3)	Report; Scoreboard	Try: Rhyk Welgemoed 3'; André Pretorius 9'; Rhyno Smith 17'; Adri Jacobs 21', 50'; Johan Deysel 26'; Con: André Pretorius 4', 10' (2/6)	Attendance: 500; Referee: Jaco Peyper

20 September 2014	SWD Eagles	24–35	Boland Cavaliers	Outeniqua Park, George
13:00	Try: Leighton Eksteen 35'; Brian Skosana 53'; Mzwanele Zito 81'; Con: Elric van Vuuren 36', 54', 82' (3/3); Pen: Elric van Vuuren 40' (1/2)	Report; Scoreboard	Try: Zandré Jordaan 11'; Cheswin Williams 28'; Danwel Demas 56', 68'; Con: Eric Zana 12', 29', 69' (3/4); Pen: Eric Zana 61', 67' (2/3); Drop: Eric Zana 20' (1/1); Earl Lewis (0/1)	Referee: Ben Crouse

20 September 2014	Falcons	36–27	Griffons	Barnard Stadium, Kempton Park
15:00	Try: Shane Kirkwood 16'; Dirk Dippenaar 38'; Kyle Hendricks 41'; Friedle Olivier 73'; Con: Jaun Kotzé 42', 74' (2/4); Pen: Jaun Kotzé 25', 53', 62', 69' (4/4)	Report; Scoreboard	Try: Tertius Maarman 8', 48'; Vuyo Mbotho 66'; Con: Franna du Toit 9', 49' (2/2); Louis Strydom 67' (1/1); Pen: Franna du Toit 33', 56' (2/2); Cards: Aubrey McDonald (yellow card) 37' to 48'	Referee: Federico Anselmi

=== Round Twelve ===
26 September 2014	Boland Cavaliers	27–6	Border Bulldogs	Boland Stadium, Wellington
16:00	Try: Earl Lewis 47'; Danwel Demas 52'; Ulrich Pretorius 63'; Cheswin Williams 70'; Con: Eric Zana 48', 53' (2/4); Pen: Eric Zana 5' (1/1)	Report; Scoreboard	Pen: Masixole Banda 19', 23' (2/4); Drop: Masixole Banda (0/1); Cards: Lundi Ralarala (yellow card) 46' to 56'	Referee: Pro Legoete

27 September 2014	Leopards	50–29	Falcons	Olën Park, Potchefstroom
14:15	Try: Sergio Torrens 5'; HP Swart 14' penalty try 30'; Sylvian Mahuza 41'; Deon Carney 54'; Dillon Smit 57', 70'; Adri Jacobs 64'; Con: André Pretorius (0/1); Rhyno Smith 15', 31', 42', 58', 65' (5/7); Cards: HP Swart (yellow card) 24' to 35'; Joe Smith (yellow card) 35' to 43'	Report; Scoreboard	Try: Jacques Verwey 25' penalty try 34'; Dirk Dippenaar 38'; Anrich Richter 51'; Andrew van Tonder 61'; Con: Jaun Kotzé 35', 52' (2/5); Cards: Marlyn Williams (yellow card) 30' to 41'; Thulani Ngidi (yellow card) 73'	Referee: Marius Jonker

27 September 2014	Griffons	27–42	SWD Eagles	North West Stadium, Welkom
15:00	Try: Tertius Maarman 20', 77'; Wynand Pienaar 52'; Chris Ehlers 69'; Con: Franna du Toit 53', 70' (2/4); Pen: Franna du Toit 18' (1/1)	Report; Scoreboard	Try: Dwayne Kelly 7', 24'; Elric van Vuuren 27'; Roy Godfrey 43'; Junior Bester 48'; Brian Skosana 71'; Con: Elric van Vuuren 8', 25', 28', 44', 49', 72' (6/6)	Attendance: 200; Referee: Quinton Immelman

=== Title Play-Off Games ===
==== Semi-finals ====
3 October 2014	Griffons	45–43	SWD Eagles	North West Stadium, Welkom
13:30	Try: Tertius Maarman 36'; Chris Ehlers 48'; Norman Nelson 54', 66'; Wynand Pienaar 68'; Con: Louis Strydom 37', 49', 55', 69' (4/5); Pen: Louis Strydom 19', 23' (2/3); Drop: Louis Strydom 42', 82' (2/3)	Scoreboard	Try: Clinton Wagman 25', 56'; Christo du Plessis 51'; Ashwin Scott 60'; Con: Elric van Vuuren 26', 52', 57', 61' (4/4); Pen: Elric van Vuuren 9', 15', 40', 47', 78' (5/5)	Referee: Ben Crouse

3 October 2014	Leopards	24–31	Falcons	Olën Park, Potchefstroom
16:00	Try: Rhyno Smith 7', 32'; Sylvian Mahuza 25', 75'; Con: André Pretorius 8', 26' (2/3); Rhyno Smith (0/1); Drop: Rhyno Smith (0/1)	Scoreboard	Try: JP Mostert 10'; Dirk Dippenaar 14', 21'; Anrich Richter 50'; Bruce Muller 67'; Con: Jaun Kotzé 11', 15', 68' (3/5); Cards: Bruce Muller (yellow card) 74'	Referee: Quinton Immelman

Following the match between the Leopards and the Falcons, the former lodged a complaint with the South African Rugby Union regarding the eligibility of Falcons fly-half Clinton Swart. The Leopards argued that Swart was only eligible for the final two matches of the Currie Cup First Division competition and therefore not eligible to play in the semi-finals. However, SARU Judicial Officer Rob Stelzner SC, ruled that Swart fulfilled the eligibility criteria and rejected the complaint.

==== Final ====
17 October 2014	Griffons	23–21	Falcons	North West Stadium, Welkom
15:30	Try: Boela Abrahams 15'; Norman Nelson 43'; Con: Louis Strydom 16', 44' (2/2); Pen: Louis Strydom 5', 40' (2/4); Drop: Louis Strydom (0/1); Boela Abrahams 73' (1/1)	Report; Scoreboard	Try: Jacques Verwey 29'; Anrich Richter 53'; Con: Jaun Kotzé 30' (1/2); Pen: Jaun Kotzé 8', 12' (2/2); Drop: Jaun Kotzé (0/1); Clinton Swart 24' (1/2)	Referee: Ben Crouse

== Honours ==
2014 Absa Currie Cup
First Division Champions
Griffons
2nd title

== Players ==
=== Player statistics ===
The following table contains points which have been scored in the 2014 Currie Cup First Division and excludes points scored in the 2014 Currie Cup qualification series:

All point scorers
No	Player	Team	T	C	P	DG	Pts
1	Elric van Vuuren	SWD Eagles	1	19	15	0	88
2	Jaun Kotzé	Falcons	0	13	11	0	59
3	Louis Strydom	Griffons	0	13	8	2	56
4	André Pretorius	Leopards	1	16	4	0	49
5	Masixole Banda	Border Bulldogs	1	6	7	0	38
5	Eric Zana	Boland Cavaliers	2	8	3	1	38
7	Franna du Toit	Griffons	0	7	5	0	29
8	Tertius Maarman	Griffons	5	0	0	0	25
8	Rhyno Smith	Leopards	3	5	0	0	25
10	Boela Abrahams	Griffons	4	0	0	1	23
11	Johan Deysel	Leopards	4	0	0	0	20
11	Dirk Dippenaar	Falcons	4	0	0	0	20
11	Kyle Hendricks	Falcons	4	0	0	0	20
11	Sylvian Mahuza	Leopards	4	0	0	0	20
11	Norman Nelson	Griffons	4	0	0	0	20
16	Alshaun Bock	SWD Eagles	3	0	0	0	15
16	Danwel Demas	Boland Cavaliers	3	0	0	0	15
16	Morné Hugo	Boland Cavaliers	0	3	3	0	15
16	Adri Jacobs	Leopards	3	0	0	0	15
16	Dwayne Kelly	SWD Eagles	3	0	0	0	15
16	Hoffmann Maritz	Leopards	3	0	0	0	15
16	Bruce Muller	Falcons	3	0	0	0	15
16	Wynand Pienaar	Griffons	3	0	0	0	15
16	Anrich Richter	Falcons	3	0	0	0	15
16	Rynardt van Wyk	Border Bulldogs	3	0	0	0	15
16	Jacques Verwey	Falcons	3	0	0	0	15
27	Chris Ehlers	Griffons	2	0	0	0	10
27	Morné Hanekom	Leopards	2	0	0	0	10
27	Zandré Jordaan	Boland Cavaliers	2	0	0	0	10
27	Strand Kruger	Boland Cavaliers	2	0	0	0	10
27	Richard Lawson	Boland Cavaliers	2	0	0	0	10
27	Makazole Mapimpi	Border Bulldogs	2	0	0	0	10
27	Vuyo Mbotho	Griffons	2	0	0	0	10
27	Aubrey McDonald	Griffons	2	0	0	0	10
27	Lithabile Mgwadleka	Border Bulldogs	2	0	0	0	10
27	JP Mostert	Falcons	2	0	0	0	10
27	Japie Nel	Griffons	2	0	0	0	10
27	Lundi Ralarala	Border Bulldogs	2	0	0	0	10
27	Daniel Roberts	SWD Eagles	2	0	0	0	10
27	Brian Skosana	SWD Eagles	2	0	0	0	10
27	Dillon Smit	Leopards	2	0	0	0	10
27	HP Swart	Leopards	2	0	0	0	10
27	George Tossel	Leopards	2	0	0	0	10
27	Clinton Wagman	SWD Eagles	2	0	0	0	10
27	Rhyk Welgemoed	Leopards	2	0	0	0	10
27	Cheswin Williams	Boland Cavaliers	2	0	0	0	10
47	Junior Bester	SWD Eagles	1	0	0	0	5
47	Deon Carney	Leopards	1	0	0	0	5
47	Coert Cronjé	Falcons	1	0	0	0	5
47	Jovelian de Koker	Boland Cavaliers	1	0	0	0	5
47	Christo du Plessis	SWD Eagles	1	0	0	0	5
47	Martin du Toit	SWD Eagles	1	0	0	0	5
47	Leighton Eksteen	SWD Eagles	1	0	0	0	5
47	Roy Godfrey	SWD Eagles	1	0	0	0	5
47	Hansie Graaff	Border Bulldogs	0	1	1	0	5
47	Shane Kirkwood	Falcons	1	0	0	0	5
47	Clemen Lewis	Boland Cavaliers	1	0	0	0	5
47	Earl Lewis	Boland Cavaliers	1	0	0	0	5
47	Mihlali Mpafi	Border Bulldogs	1	0	0	0	5
47	Lindani Ndlela	Border Bulldogs	1	0	0	0	5
47	Friedle Olivier	Falcons	1	0	0	0	5
47	Buran Parks	SWD Eagles	1	0	0	0	5
47	Ulrich Pretorius	Boland Cavaliers	1	0	0	0	5
47	Christian Rust	Boland Cavaliers	1	0	0	0	5
47	Ashwin Scott	SWD Eagles	1	0	0	0	5
47	Frans Sisita	Griffons	1	0	0	0	5
47	Nicky Steyn	Griffons	1	0	0	0	5
47	Sergio Torrens	Leopards	1	0	0	0	5
47	Albert Trytsman	Boland Cavaliers	1	0	0	0	5
47	Joe van der Hoogt	Griffons	1	0	0	0	5
47	Andrew van Tonder	Falcons	1	0	0	0	5
47	Jacques Vermaak	Leopards	1	0	0	0	5
47	Mzwanele Zito	SWD Eagles	1	0	0	0	5
74	Clinton Swart	Falcons	0	0	0	1	3
–	penalty try	Falcons	2	0	0	0	10
–	penalty try	Leopards	1	0	0	0	5
* Legend: T = Tries, C = Conversions, P = Penalties, DG = Drop Goals, Pts = Points.

=== Squad Lists ===
The teams released the following squad lists:

Boland Cavaliers

Forwards

- Keenan Abrahams
- Gavin Annandale
- Yves Bashiya
- Ryno Coetzee
- Ashton Constant
- Martin Dreyer
- Kelvin Fikster
- Jason Fraser
- Francois Hanekom
- Zandré Jordaan
- Hanno Kitshoff
- Strand Kruger
- Clemen Lewis
- Dumisani Meslane
- Khwezi Mkhafu
- Ulrich Pretorius
- Franzel September
- Chaney Willemse
- Did not play:
- SP Wessels

Backs

- Christopher Bosch
- Jovelian de Koker
- Danwel Demas
- Sino Ganto
- Marnus Hugo
- Morné Hugo
- Richard Lawson
- Earl Lewis
- Christian Rust
- Edwin Sass
- Duwayne Smart
- Albert Trytsman
- Chevandré van Schoor
- Cheswin Williams
- Eric Zana
- Did not play:
- Ryno Conradie
- Arno Fortuin
- Harlon Klaasen
- Nathaniel Manuel
- Tiaan Ramat

Coach

- Abé Davids / Dewey Swartbooi

Border Bulldogs

Forwards

- Ludwe Booi
- Onke Dubase
- Martin Ferreira
- Anthonie Gronum
- Simon Kerrod
- Blake Kyd
- Wayne Lemley
- Athenkosi Manentsa
- Siya Mdaka
- Mihlali Mpafi
- Buhle Mxunyelwa
- Nkosi Nofuma
- Lukhanyo Nomzanga
- Wandile Putuma
- Bryce Rennie
- Rynardt van Wyk
- Lindokuhle Welemu
- Yanga Xakalashe
- Did not play:
- Cheslin Goeda
- Johannes Jonker
- Naythan Knoetze
- Gareth Krause
- Sibulele Nanto
- Siyamthanda Ngande
- Ayabonga Nomboyo
- Anele Sibeko

Backs

- Masixole Banda
- Hansie Graaff
- Ruan Jacobs
- Ntando Kebe
- Bangi Kobese
- Michael Makase
- Makazole Mapimpi
- Lithabile Mgwadleka
- Thembani Mkokeli
- Lindani Ndlela
- Mario Noordman
- Lundi Ralarala
- Joe Seerane
- Oliver Zono
- Did not play:
- Niell Jacobs
- Skhangele Mateza
- Sipho Nofemele
- Siya Pati
- Lolo Waka

Coach

- André Human

Falcons

Forwards

- Jacques Alberts
- Devlin Hope
- JP Jonck
- Shane Kirkwood
- Ernst Ladendorf
- JP Mostert
- Dean Muir
- Bruce Muller
- Thulani Ngidi
- Friedle Olivier
- Nico Pretorius
- Brian Shabangu
- Dandré van der Westhuizen
- Andrew van Tonder
- Jacques Verwey
- Marlyn Williams
- Did not play:
- Gerhard Engelbrecht
- Vince Gwavu
- KK Kgame
- Riaan Matthee
- De Wet Meyer
- Chris Richardson
- Andries Schutte
- Peet Vorster

Backs

- Coert Cronjé
- Dirk Dippenaar
- Cecil Dumond
- Wayne Gardner
- Kyle Hendricks
- Jaun Kotzé
- Sino Nyoka
- Willie Odendaal
- Jaco Oosthuizen
- Arno Poley
- Dewald Pretorius
- Anrich Richter
- Jaco Snyman
- Clinton Swart
- Andrew van Wyk
- Did not play:
- Lukhanyo Am
- Riaan Arends
- Ryan Carmichael
- Angus Cleophas
- Grant Janke
- Sandile Ngcobo
- Etienne Taljaard
- Lenience Tambwera
- Waylon Thompson

Coach

- Johan du Toit

Griffons

Forwards

- Gerard Baard
- PW Botha
- Jan Breedt
- Rudi Britz
- Wikus Davis
- Chris Ehlers
- Dirk Grobbelaar
- Boetie Groenewald
- Elandré Huggett
- Armandt Koster
- Erik le Roux
- Heinrich Roelfse
- Frans Sisita
- Martin Sithole
- Hannes Snyman
- Nicky Steyn
- Joe van der Hoogt
- Danie van der Merwe
- Vaatjie van der Merwe
- Did not play:
- Mlungisi Bali
- Niell Jordaan
- AJ le Roux
- Henru Liebenberg
- Werner Lourens
- Mayizukiswe Ntshoko
- Kevin Stevens

Backs

- Boela Abrahams
- Franna du Toit
- Werner Griesel
- Colin Herbert
- Tertius Maarman
- Vuyo Mbotho
- Aubrey McDonald
- Japie Nel
- Norman Nelson
- Ossie Nortjé
- Wynand Pienaar
- Louis Strydom
- Vink van der Walt
- Did not play:
- Pieter-Steyn de Wet
- Joubert Engelbrecht
- Sheldon Erasmus
- Cameron Jacobs
- Bren Marais
- Shaun Prins

Coach

- Oersond Gorgonzola

Leopards

Forwards

- Stoof Bezuidenhout
- Molotsi Bouwer
- Deon Carney
- Marius Fourie
- Morné Hanekom
- John-Roy Jenkinson
- Danie Jordaan
- Juan Language
- JC Oberholzer
- Francois Robertse
- Joe Smith
- HP Swart
- PJ Uys
- Schalk van Heerden
- Ruan Venter
- Jacques Vermaak
- Rhyk Welgemoed
- Johan Wessels
- Did not play:
- Jaco Buys
- Stompie de Wet
- Arno Ebersohn
- Robert Kruger
- Armandt Liebenberg
- Mash Mafela
- Edgar Marutlulle
- Stairs Mhlongo
- Lucky Ngcamu
- SJ Niemand
- Siya November
- Henri Scharneck
- Brendon Snyman
- Akker van der Merwe
- Elardus Venter

Backs

- Rowayne Beukman
- Lucian Cupido
- Kobus de Kock
- Johan Deysel
- Warren Gilbert
- Adri Jacobs
- Sylvian Mahuza
- Hoffmann Maritz
- Luther Obi
- André Pretorius
- Dillon Smit
- Rhyno Smith
- Sergio Torrens
- George Tossel
- Vian van der Watt
- Percy Williams
- Did not play:
- Justin Botha
- Adriaan Engelbrecht
- Tshotsho Mbovane
- Leon Meyer
- Gerhard Nortier
- Wynand Olivier
- SW Oosthuizen
- Jaap Pienaar
- Chriswill September
- Pieter Smith
- Malherbe Swart
- Malan van der Merwe

Coach

- Robert du Preez

SWD Eagles

Forwards

- Junior Bester
- Ashley Buys
- Layle Delo
- Christo du Plessis
- Dexter Fahey
- Roy Godfrey
- Marcel Groenewald
- Lyndon Hartnick
- Kurt Haupt
- Grant Kemp
- Wayne Khan
- Grant le Roux
- Schalk Oelofse
- Davon Raubenheimer
- Shaun Raubenheimer
- Janneman Stander
- Peet van der Walt
- Mzwanele Zito
- Did not play:
- Hannes Franklin
- Raoul Larson

Backs

- Alshaun Bock
- Martin du Toit
- Mzo Dyantyi
- Leighton Eksteen
- Dwayne Kelly
- Hentzwill Pedro
- Daniel Roberts
- Ashwin Scott
- Brian Skosana
- Gerrit Smith
- Elric van Vuuren
- Luzuko Vulindlu
- Clinton Wagman
- Did not play:
- Karlo Aspeling
- Jarryd Buys
- Danie Faasen
- Anver Venter

Coach

- Bevin Fortuin

== See also ==
- 2014 Currie Cup Premier Division
- 2014 Currie Cup qualification
- 2014 Vodacom Cup
