= 2013 Currie Cup First Division =

Domestic rugby union competition

- Countries: South Africa
- Date: 29 June – 11 October 2013
- Champions: Pumas (3rd title)
- Runners-up: Eastern Province Kings
- Promoted: None
- Matches played: 59
- Tries scored: 441 (average 7.5 per match)
- Top point scorer: Carl Bezuidenhout (217)
- Top try scorer: Alshaun Bock (17)

The 2013 Currie Cup First Division was contested from 29 June to 11 October 2013. The tournament (also known as the Absa Currie Cup First Division for sponsorship reasons) is the second tier of South Africa's premier domestic rugby union competition, featuring teams representing either entire provinces or substantial regions within provinces.

== Competition ==
=== Regular season and title playoffs ===
There were 8 participating teams in the 2013 Currie Cup First Division. These teams played each other twice over the course of the season, once at home and once away.

Teams received four points for a win and two points for a draw. Bonus points were awarded to teams that scored 4 or more tries in a game, as well as to teams losing a match by 7 points or less. Teams were ranked by points, then points difference (points scored less points conceded).

The top 4 teams qualified for the title play-offs. In the semi-finals, the team that finished first had home advantage against the team that finished fourth, while the team that finished second had home advantage against the team that finished third. The winners of these semi-finals played each other in the final, at the home venue of the higher-placed team.

=== Promotion playoffs ===
The top team on the log also qualified for the promotion/relegation play-offs. That team played off against the team placed sixth in the 2013 Currie Cup Premier Division over two legs. The winner over these two ties (determined via team tables, with all Currie Cup ranking regulations in effect) qualified for the 2014 Currie Cup Premier Division, while the losing team qualified for the 2014 Currie Cup First Division.

== Teams ==
Location of teams in 2013 Currie Cup First Division

=== Team Listing ===
2013 Currie Cup First Division teams
Team	Sponsored Name	Stadium/s	Sponsored Name
Boland Cavaliers	Regent Boland Cavaliers	Boland Stadium, Wellington	Boland Stadium
Border Bulldogs	Border Bulldogs	Buffalo City Stadium, East London	Buffalo City Stadium
Eastern Province Kings	Eastern Province Kings	Nelson Mandela Bay Stadium, Port Elizabeth	Nelson Mandela Bay Stadium
Falcons	Falcons	Barnard Stadium, Kempton Park	Barnard Stadium
Griffons	Down Touch Griffons	North West Stadium, Welkom	North West Stadium
Leopards	Leopards	Olën Park, Potchefstroom	Profert Olën Park
Pumas	Steval Pumas	Mbombela Stadium, Mbombela	Mbombela Stadium
SWD Eagles	SWD Eagles	Outeniqua Park, George	Outeniqua Park

== Log ==
=== Final standings ===
2013 Currie Cup First Division Log
Pos	Team	Pld	W	D	L	PF	PA	PD	TF	TA	TB	LB	Pts	Qualification
1	Pumas (C)	14	14	0	0	601	254	+347	76	31	10	0	66	Promotion Play-Offs; Title play-off semi-final
2	Eastern Province Kings	14	10	0	4	441	297	+144	51	34	7	3	50	Title play-off semi-final
3	Leopards	14	8	0	6	448	398	+50	63	46	9	3	44	Title play-off semi-final
4	SWD Eagles	14	7	0	7	460	452	+8	58	58	8	5	41	Title play-off semi-final
5	Boland Cavaliers	14	6	1	7	329	393	−64	45	54	3	3	32	
6	Griffons	14	3	2	9	367	534	−167	49	72	7	8	31	
7	Border Bulldogs	14	4	0	10	277	365	−88	32	45	3	6	25	
8	Falcons	14	2	1	11	349	579	−230	45	79	6	2	18	

Rules for classification: 4 points for a win; 2 points for a draw; 1 bonus point for a loss by seven points or less; 1 bonus point for scoring four or more tries in a match
(C) Champion

=== Round-by-round ===
Team Progression – 2013 Currie Cup First Division
Team	R1	R2	R3	R4	R5	R6	R7	R8	R9	R10	R11	R12	R13	R14
Pumas	4 (3rd)	8 (2nd)	13 (2nd)	17 (1st)	22 (1st)	27 (1st)	32 (1st)	37 (1st)	42 (1st)	47 (1st)	52 (1st)	56 (1st)	61 (1st)	65 (1st)
Eastern Province Kings	0 (6th)	5 (4th)	6 (5th)	11 (5th)	12 (5th)	17 (3rd)	21 (4th)	23 (4th)	28 (4th)	33 (3rd)	37 (2nd)	42 (2nd)	46 (2nd)	51 (2nd)
Leopards	5 (1st)	10 (1st)	14 (1st)	15 (2nd)	16 (2nd)	20 (2nd)	22 (2nd)	26 (3rd)	31 (2nd)	32 (4th)	32 (4th)	37 (3rd)	39 (4th)	44 (3rd)
SWD Eagles	5 (2nd)	6 (3rd)	11 (3rd)	13 (3rd)	13 (4th)	17 (4th)	22 (3rd)	27 (2nd)	29 (3rd)	34 (2nd)	35 (3rd)	36 (4th)	41 (3rd)	41 (4th)
Boland Cavaliers	0 (8th)	4 (5th)	8 (4th)	12 (4th)	16 (3rd)	16 (5th)	21 (5th)	22 (5th)	27 (5th)	28 (5th)	29 (5th)	29 (5th)	29 (5th)	32 (5th)
Griffons	2 (4th)	2 (6th)	2 (8th)	3 (8th)	8 (8th)	9 (7th)	10 (6th)	15 (6th)	15 (6th)	16 (6th)	21 (6th)	23 (6th)	24 (7th)	27 (6th)
Border Bulldogs	0 (7th)	1 (8th)	2 (7th)	6 (6th)	8 (7th)	8 (8th)	9 (7th)	11 (7th)	11 (7th)	15 (7th)	16 (8th)	21 (7th)	25 (6th)	25 (7th)
Falcons	2 (4th)	2 (7th)	4 (6th)	4 (7th)	9 (6th)	9 (6th)	9 (8th)	10 (8th)	11 (8th)	12 (8th)	17 (7th)	17 (8th)	18 (8th)	18 (8th)
The table above shows a team's progression throughout the season. For each round, their cumulative points total is shown with the overall log position in brackets.
Key:	win	draw	loss											

== Fixtures and results ==
The following fixtures were released:

All times are South African (GMT+2).

=== Regular season ===
==== Round one ====
28 June 2013	Falcons	30–30	Griffons	Barnard Stadium, Kempton Park
15:00	Try: Jongi Nokwe 2'; Willie Odendaal 8'; Anrich Richter 68'; Con: Wesley Roberts 2', 8', 68' (3/3); Pen: Wesley Roberts 19', 43', 53' (3/6); Drop: Wesley Roberts (0/1); Anrich Richter (0/1); Jaun Kotzé (0/1); Cards: Shane Kirkwood (yellow card) 12' to 22'	Scoreboard; Report	Try: Werner Griesel 13'; Nicky Steyn 26'; Tertius Maarman 62'; Con: Louis Strydom 14', 27', 62' (3/3); Pen: Louis Strydom 40', 48', 79' (3/4)	Attendance: 100; Referee: Sindile Mayende

28 June 2013	Border Bulldogs	12–36	SWD Eagles	Buffalo City Stadium, East London
19:00	Try: Chrislyn van Schalkwyk 28'; Khwezi Mkhafu 59'; Con: Karlo Aspeling 29' (1/2)	Scoreboard; Report	Try: Clinton Wagman 18'; Alshaun Bock 26', 76'; Martin Ferreira 54'; Christo du Plessis 82'; Con: Jeff Taljard 19', 27' (2/3); Gerrit Smith 77', 83' (2/2); Pen: Jeff Taljard 25' (1/1)	Attendance: 500; Referee: Pro Legoete

28 June 2013	Eastern Province Kings	13–29	Pumas	Nelson Mandela Bay Stadium, Port Elizabeth
19:10	Try: Wesley Dunlop 57'; Con: Wesley Dunlop 58' (1/1); Pen: Wesley Dunlop 19', 27' (2/3)	Scoreboard; Report	Try: Trompie Pretorius 16', 70'; Con: Carl Bezuidenhout 17', 71' (2/2); Pen: Carl Bezuidenhout 5', 29', 32', 53' (4/6); Drop: Carl Bezuidenhout 50' (1/1); Cards: Stefan Watermeyer (yellow card) 62' to 71'; RW Kember (yellow card) 68' to 78'	Attendance: 3,400; Referee: Marius Jonker

29 June 2013	Boland Cavaliers	15–45	Leopards	Boland Stadium, Wellington
16:00	Try: Braam Gerber 39'; Jacquin Jansen 44'; Con: Eric Zana 45' (1/2); Pen: Eric Zana 4' (1/1); Cards: Ben Venter (red card) 19'	Scoreboard; Report	Try: Hennie Skorbinski 6'; Edmar Marais 24'; Jarryd Buys 27'; Edgar Marutlulle 34'; George Tossel 55', 61'; Con: Adriaan Engelbrecht 7', 25', 27', 35', 55', 62' (6/6); Pen: Adriaan Engelbrecht 14' (1/1); Cards: Johann Laker (yellow card) 38' to 48'; Edgar Marutlulle (yellow card) 49' to 59'	Attendance: 550; Referee: Ben Crouse

==== Round two ====
5 July 2013	Leopards	50–25	Falcons	Olën Park, Potchefstroom
17:15	Try: Edmar Marais 8', 17', 20'; Hennie Skorbinski 46'; Adriaan Engelbrecht 52'; Edgar Marutlulle 55'; Sylvian Mahuza 71'; Con: Adriaan Engelbrecht 9', 21', 47', 53', 56', 72' (6/7); Pen: Adriaan Engelbrecht 12' (1/1)	Scoreboard; Report	Try: Anrich Richter 27'; Willie Odendaal 60'; Jaun Kotzé 74'; Con: Wesley Roberts 28', 61' (2/2); Jaun Kotzé (0/1); Pen: Wesley Roberts 3', 11' (2/2)	Attendance: 500; Referee: Pro Legoete

5 July 2013	SWD Eagles	17–22	Boland Cavaliers	Outeniqua Park, George
19:00	Try: Christo du Plessis 18'; Alshaun Bock 26'; Con: Jeff Taljard 19', 26' (2/2); Pen: Jeff Taljard 74' (1/1)	Scoreboard; Report	Try: Braam Gerber 9'; Zandré Jordaan 39'; JC Astle 59'; Con: Len Olivier 10', 60' (2/3); Pen: Len Olivier 48' (1/2); Jacquin Jansen (0/1)	Attendance: 650; Referee: Marius van der Westhuizen

5 July 2013	Pumas	23–16	Border Bulldogs	Mbombela Stadium, Mbombela
19:10	Try: Jaco Bouwer 54'; Corné Steenkamp 78'; Con: Carl Bezuidenhout 55', 78' (2/2); Pen: Carl Bezuidenhout 31', 40', 72' (3/3)	Scoreboard; Report	Try: Dean Muir 16'; Con: Karlo Aspeling 17' (1/1); Pen: Karlo Aspeling 37', 51', 67' (3/3); Cards: Nomani Tonga (yellow card) 21' to 31'	Referee: Rasta Rasivhenge

6 July 2013	Griffons	21–37	Eastern Province Kings	North West Stadium, Welkom
15:00	Try: Chris Ehlers 21'; Elandré Huggett 25'; Lehan Koekemoer 65'; Con: Louis Strydom 22', 26', 66' (3/3)	Scoreboard; Report	Try: Aidon Davis 7'; Dalton Davis 28'; Hadleigh Parkes 37'; Siviwe Soyizwapi 39'; Ross Geldenhuys 61'; Con: Wesley Dunlop 8', 29', 38' (3/5); Pen: Wesley Dunlop 10', 64' (2/3); Scott van Breda (0/1)	Attendance: 100; Referee: Jaco Kotze

==== Round three ====
12 July 2013	Falcons	37–38	SWD Eagles	Barnard Stadium, Kempton Park
15:00	Try: Willie Odendaal 21', 31', 37'; Coert Cronjé 43'; Shane Kirkwood 75'; Con: Jaun Kotzé 32', 38', 44' (3/4); Wesley Roberts (0/1); Pen: Jaun Kotzé 18' (1/2); Drop: Jaun Kotzé 15' (1/2)	Scoreboard; Report	Try: Martin du Toit 7'; Alshaun Bock 40', 71', 79'; Justin van Staden 47'; Christo du Plessis 66'; Con: Jeff Taljard 67', 72', 80' (3/5); Justin van Staden 48' (1/1); Cards: Ghafoer Luckan (yellow card) 54' to 67'	Referee: Rasta Rasivhenge

12 July 2013	Boland Cavaliers	22–20	Border Bulldogs	Boland Stadium, Wellington
16:00	Try: Jacquin Jansen 43', 55'; Franzel September 53'; Con: Len Olivier 43', 54' (2/3); Pen: Len Olivier 61' (1/1)	Scoreboard; Report	Try: Matthew Taljard 71'; Quinton Crocker 81'; Con: Cecil Dumond 72', 82' (2/2); Pen: Karlo Aspeling 9' (1/3); Cecil Dumond 49' (1/1); Cards: Renier Schoeman (yellow card) 32' to 41'	Attendance: 320; Referee: Quinton Immelman

12 July 2013	Eastern Province Kings	18–22	Leopards	Nelson Mandela Bay Stadium, Port Elizabeth
19:00	Pen: Scott van Breda 9', 51', 57', 75' (4/4); Wesley Dunlop 14', 27' (2/2)	Scoreboard; Report	Try: Edmar Marais 5'; Morné Hanekom 33'; Johann Laker 71'; Con: Adriaan Engelbrecht 6', 34' (2/3); Pen: Adriaan Engelbrecht 11' (1/2)	Referee: Sindile Mayende

13 July 2013	Pumas	56–10	Griffons	Mbombela Stadium, Mbombela
15:00	Try: JW Bell 28', 40', 53'; Corné Steenkamp 33'; Carl Bezuidenhout 44'; RW Kember 59'; Rosko Specman 75'; Con: Carl Bezuidenhout 28', 40', 44', 53' (4/5); Tiaan Marx 59', 75' (2/2); Pen: Carl Bezuidenhout 3', 38', 42' (3/3)	Scoreboard; Report	Try: Japie Nel 79'; Con: Joubert Engelbrecht 80' (1/1); Pen: Joubert Engelbrecht 13' (1/1)	Referee: Jaco van Heerden

==== Round four ====
19 July 2013	Boland Cavaliers	20–7	Falcons	Boland Stadium, Wellington
16:50	Try: Senan van der Merwe 12', 17'; Franzel September 32'; Con: Len Olivier 33' (1/3); Pen: Len Olivier 21' (1/1)	Scoreboard; Report	Try: Anrich Richter 38'; Con: Jaun Kotzé 40' (1/1); Pen: Jaun Kotzé (0/2)	Attendance: 750; Referee: Marius van der Westhuizen

19 July 2013	Leopards	27–32	Pumas	Olën Park, Potchefstroom
17:15	Try: Edmar Marais 13'; Johann Laker 26'; Danie Dames 70'; Con: Adriaan Engelbrecht 14', 27', 71' (3/3); Pen: Adriaan Engelbrecht 2', 41' (2/2)	Scoreboard; Report	Try: Rosko Specman 18'; Coenie van Wyk 36'; Con: Carl Bezuidenhout 19', 37' (2/2); Pen: Carl Bezuidenhout 7', 10', 21', 50', 54', 64' (6/6)	Attendance: 250; Referee: Lourens van der Merwe

19 July 2013	SWD Eagles	34–35	Eastern Province Kings	Outeniqua Park, George
19:10	Try: Alshaun Bock 4', 47', 56'; Jeff Taljard 17'; Shaun Raubenheimer 28'; Con: Jeff Taljard 5', 18', 57' (3/5); Pen: Jeff Taljard (0/1); Justin van Staden 69' (1/1); Cards: Christo du Plessis (yellow card) 36' to 46'	Scoreboard; Report	Try: Mpho Mbiyozo 37', 72'; Aidon Davis 40'; Siviwe Soyizwapi 52'; Marlou van Niekerk 76'; Con: Ntabeni Dukisa (0/2); Marlou van Niekerk 53' (1/2); Kayle van Zyl 77' (1/1); Pen: Ntabeni Dukisa 14', 22' (2/4)	Referee: Pro Legoete

20 July 2013	Border Bulldogs	22–20	Griffons	Buffalo City Stadium, East London
14:30	Try: Quinton Crocker 25'; Andrew van Wyk 28'; Karlo Aspeling 79'; Con: Karlo Aspeling 29', 80' (2/3); Pen: Karlo Aspeling 15' (1/2); Cards: Matthew Taljard (yellow card) 70'	Scoreboard; Report	Try: Nicky Steyn 10'; Tertius Maarman 37'; Con: Louis Strydom 11', 38' (2/2); Pen: Louis Strydom 35', 70' (2/3)	Attendance: 750; Referee: Marius Jonker

==== Round Five ====
26 July 2013	Falcons	34–29	Border Bulldogs	Barnard Stadium, Kempton Park
15:00	Try: JP Mostert 3'; Rinus Bothma 19'; Bovril de Bruin 29'; Coert Cronjé 59'; Con: Jaun Kotzé 4', 20', 30', 59' (4/4); Pen: Jaun Kotzé 33', 75' (2/2); Drop: Jaun Kotzé (0/2)	Scoreboard; Report	Try: Andrew van Wyk 21'; Khwezi Mkhafu 42'; Stairs Mhlongo 46'; Brian Shabangu 66'; Con: Niell Jacobs 22' (1/2); Quinton Crocker 47', 66' (2/2); Pen: Niell Jacobs 25' (1/3)	Attendance: 300; Referee: Marius Jonker

26 July 2013	Eastern Province Kings	23–30	Boland Cavaliers	Nelson Mandela Bay Stadium, Port Elizabeth
16:45	Try: Mpho Mbiyozo 9'; Wayne Stevens 68'; Siviwe Soyizwapi 73'; Con: Wesley Dunlop (0/1); Scott van Breda 69' (1/2); Pen: Wesley Dunlop 15' (1/1); Scott van Breda 31' (1/1)	Scoreboard; Report	Try: Zandré Jordaan 5'; PJ van Zyl 20'; Jacquin Jansen 44'; Con: Len Olivier 6', 21', 45' (3/3); Pen: Len Olivier 24', 33', 50' (3/3)	Referee: Jason Jaftha

27 July 2013	Griffons	34–28	Leopards	North West Stadium, Welkom
14:30	Try: Ossie Nortjé 27', 44'; Werner Griesel 59'; Erik le Roux 75'; Con: Louis Strydom 28', 45', 60', 76' (4/4); Pen: Louis Strydom 12' (1/1); Drop: Louis Strydom 77' (1/1)	Scoreboard; Report	Try: Edgar Marutlulle 15'; Edmar Marais 23', 70'; Luther Obi 81'; Con: Adriaan Engelbrecht 16', 24', 71', 82' (4/4)	Referee: Lourens van der Merwe

27 July 2013	Pumas	60–20	SWD Eagles	Mbombela Stadium, Mbombela
15:00	Try: Frank Herne 5', 37'; Carl Bezuidenhout 27'; Giant Mtyanda 51'; Vincent Koch 59'; JW Bell 63', 73'; RW Kember 78'; Eduan van der Walt 81'; Con: Carl Bezuidenhout 28', 38', 60', 63', 78', 82' (6/9); Pen: Carl Bezuidenhout 22' (1/2)	Scoreboard; Report	Try: Roy Godfrey 18'; Alshaun Bock 55'; Con: Justin van Staden 18', 56' (2/2); Pen: Justin van Staden 2', 33' (2/2)	Referee: Ben Crouse

==== Round Six ====
2 August 2013	Boland Cavaliers	5–35	Pumas	Boland Stadium, Wellington
15:00	Try: Zandré Jordaan 36'; Con: Jacquin Jansen (0/1); Pen: Ricardo Croy (0/1); Cards: Zandré Jordaan (yellow card) 10' to 20'	Scoreboard; Report	Try: Coenie van Wyk 14'; Rosko Specman 19'; Uzair Cassiem 28', 70'; Frank Herne 44'; Con: Carl Bezuidenhout 15', 20' (2/4); Coenie van Wyk (0/1); Pen: Carl Bezuidenhout 10' (1/1); Tiaan Marx 57' (1/1); Cards: Doppies le Roux (yellow card) 69'	Referee: Lourens van der Merwe

2 August 2013	SWD Eagles	30–25	Griffons	Outeniqua Park, George
19:00	Try: Alshaun Bock 11'; Grant Kemp 44'; Kabamba Floors 55'; Con: Justin van Staden 12', 45', 55' (3/3); Pen: Justin van Staden 6', 21', 35' (3/3); Cards: Grant Kemp (yellow card) 32' to 41'; Gerrit Smith (yellow card) 78'	Scoreboard; Report	Try: Jeremy Jordaan 62'; Con: Louis Strydom 62' (1/1); Pen: Louis Strydom 9', 15', 24', 29', 32', 51' (6/7); Cards: Aubrey McDonald (yellow card) 35' to 48'; Oupa Mohojé (yellow card) 78'	Attendance: 2,500; Referee: Jonathan Kaplan

3 August 2013	Falcons	18–44	Eastern Province Kings	Barnard Stadium, Kempton Park
14:00	Try: Anrich Richter 17'; Wesley Roberts 69'; Con: Jaun Kotzé 18' (1/2); Pen: Jaun Kotzé 2' (1/1); Wesley Roberts (0/1); Drop: Jaun Kotzé 46' (1/1)	Scoreboard; Report	Try: Mpho Mbiyozo 14', 35', 76'; Siyanda Grey 65'; Ntabeni Dukisa 80'; Con: Ntabeni Dukisa 15', 36', 66', 77', 80' (5/5); Pen: Ntabeni Dukisa 6', 49', 61' (3/3)	Referee: Jaco Peyper

3 August 2013	Border Bulldogs	10–26	Leopards	Buffalo City Stadium, East London
16:00	Try: Shane Spring 51'; Andrew van Wyk 74'; Con: Quinton Crocker (0/1); Cecil Dumond (0/1); Pen: Cecil Dumond (0/1); Cards: Stephan Gerber (yellow card) 30' to 40'; Spanner Pretorius (yellow card) 72'	Scoreboard; Report	Try: Brendon Snyman 32'; Luther Obi 41'; HP Swart 62'; Con: Adriaan Engelbrecht 42' (1/3); Pen: Adriaan Engelbrecht 11', 25', 28' (3/3); Drop: Adriaan Engelbrecht (0/1); Cards: Morné Hanekom (yellow card) 72'	Attendance: 1,000; Referee: Marius van der Westhuizen

==== Round Seven ====
9 August 2013	Leopards	47–50	SWD Eagles	Olën Park, Potchefstroom
17:05	Try: Morné Hanekom 6', 56'; Edgar Marutlulle 42'; Johann Laker 47'; Jarryd Buys 75'; Martin Dreyer 79'; Con: Adriaan Engelbrecht 7', 43', 57', 76' (4/6); Pen: Adriaan Engelbrecht 9', 19', 40' (3/4); Cards: Peet van der Walt (yellow card) 63' to 73'	Scoreboard; Report	Try: Shaun Raubenheimer 14'; Dumisani Meslane 28'; Martin du Toit 63'; Gerrit Smith 64'; Alshaun Bock 72'; Con: Justin van Staden 15', 29', 63', 65', 73' (5/5); Pen: Justin van Staden 21', 37', 46', 52', 60' (5/5); Drop: Justin van Staden (0/2); Cards: Schalk Oelofse (yellow card) 41' to 52'	Referee: Sindile Mayende

9 August 2013	Eastern Province Kings	9–6	Border Bulldogs	Nelson Mandela Bay Stadium, Port Elizabeth
19:00	Pen: Ntabeni Dukisa 36', 71' (2/3); Drop: Ntabeni Dukisa 78' (1/1)	Scoreboard; Report	Pen: Dale Sabbagh 47', 52' (2/3); Drop: Karlo Aspeling (0/1)	Attendance: 400; Referee: Jonathan Kaplan

10 August 2013	Griffons	35–55	Boland Cavaliers	North West Stadium, Welkom
15:00	Try: Tertius Daniller 13'; Japie Nel 25'; Danwel Demas 37'; Werner Griesel 49'; Inus Kritzinger 80'; Con: Louis Strydom 26', 38' (2/4); Inus Kritzinger (0/1); Pen: Louis Strydom 2', 42' (2/2); Cards: Aubrey McDonald (yellow card) 45' to 55'	Scoreboard; Report	Try: Clemen Lewis 6'; Eric Zana 19'; Brendon April 28', 46'; Cheswin Williams 53'; PJ van Zyl 59'; Wynand Pienaar 62'; Ulrich Pretorius 73'; Con: Eric Zana 20', 29', 54', 60', 63', 74' (6/8); Pen: Eric Zana 9' (1/1)	Attendance: 50; Referee: Pro Legoete

10 August 2013	Pumas	69–12	Falcons	Mbombela Stadium, Mbombela
15:00	Try: Stefan Watermeyer 5', 42'; Rosko Specman 15'; RW Kember 20'; Jacques Momberg 40'; JW Bell 44'; Corné Fourie 47'; De-Jay Terblanche 50'; Jaco Bouwer 73'; Con: Carl Bezuidenhout 6', 16', 21', 40', 43', 45', 48', 51', 74' (9/9); Pen: Carl Bezuidenhout 1', 13' (2/2)	Scoreboard; Report	Try: Jaun Kotzé 55'; Vince Gwavu 63'; Con: Jaun Kotzé 63' (1/2); Pen: Jaun Kotzé (0/1); Cards: Wessel du Rand (yellow card) 40' to 50'	Attendance: 750; Referee: Tiaan Jonker

==== Round Eight ====
16 August 2013	Pumas	33–32	Eastern Province Kings	Mbombela Stadium, Mbombela
19:00	Try: Jacques Momberg 40'; RW Kember 63', 73', 80'; Con: Carl Bezuidenhout 63', 73' (2/4); Pen: Carl Bezuidenhout 22', 44', 65' (3/4)	Scoreboard; Report	Try: Michael Killian 4'; Scott van Breda 28'; Steven Sykes 57'; Tiger Mangweni 60'; Nicolás Vergallo 70'; Con: Scott van Breda (0/2); George Whitehead 60', 70' (2/3); Pen: Scott van Breda 33' (1/2)	Attendance: 2,500; Referee: Marius Jonker

16 August 2013	SWD Eagles	36–31	Border Bulldogs	Outeniqua Park, George
19:00	Try: Buran Parks 4'; Mzwanele Zito 36'; Roy Godfrey 45'; Clinton Wagman 48'; Alshaun Bock 69'; Con: Justin van Staden 5', 37', 48', 69' (4/5); Pen: Justin van Staden 76' (1/1)	Scoreboard; Report	Try: Rynardt van Wyk 12', 59'; Chumani Booi 19'; Stephan Gerber 80'; Con: Dale Sabbagh (0/2); Karlo Aspeling 59' (1/2); Pen: Dale Sabbagh 33', 40' (2/4); Karlo Aspeling (0/1); Drop: Karlo Aspeling 44' (1/2)	Attendance: 1,000; Referee: Rasta Rasivhenge

17 August 2013	Leopards	22–17	Boland Cavaliers	Olën Park, Potchefstroom
15:00	Try: Luther Obi 19', 77'; Danie Dames 39'; Con: Adriaan Engelbrecht 19', 40' (2/3); Pen: Adriaan Engelbrecht 36' (1/1); Cards: Peet van der Walt (yellow card) 80'	Scoreboard; Report	Try: Cheswin Williams 4'; Johnathan Francke 56'; Brendon April 73'; Con: Eric Zana 57' (1/3); Pen: Eric Zana (0/1); Cards: Brendon April (yellow card) 46' to 57'; Jacquin Jansen (yellow card) 46' to 57'	Attendance: 200; Referee: Stuart Berry

17 August 2013	Griffons	50–35	Falcons	North West Stadium, Welkom
15:00	Try: Boetie Groenewald 12', 57'; Jeremy Jordaan 33'; Derick van Heerden 40'; Marnus Briedenhann 47'; Japie Nel 68'; Werner Griesel 73'; Inus Kritzinger 78'; Con: Tertius Maarman 34' (1/4); Inus Kritzinger 58', 69', 73', 79' (4/4)	Scoreboard; Report	Try: Coert Cronjé 4'; Jongi Nokwe 23', 28'; Willie Odendaal 76'; Con: Jaun Kotzé 24', 29' (2/3); JC Roos 76' (1/1); Pen: JC Roos 44' (1/1); Drop: Jaun Kotzé 8', 27' (2/2); Cards: Vince Gwavu (yellow card) 40' to 50'	Attendance: 150; Referee: Jason Jaftha

==== Round Nine ====
23 August 2013	Border Bulldogs	10–42	Pumas	Buffalo City Stadium, East London
15:00	Try: Blake Kyd 15'; Con: Dale Sabbagh 16' (1/1); Pen: Dale Sabbagh 39' (1/1)	Scoreboard; Report	Try: Rosko Specman 19'; Jaco Bouwer 36'; Giant Mtyanda 44'; JW Bell 51'; Eduan van der Walt 58'; Tiaan Marx 58'; Con: JC Roos 20', 37', 45', 52', 59', 79' (6/6)	Attendance: 1,000; Referee: Jaco Kotze

23 August 2013	Eastern Province Kings	63–7	Griffons	Nelson Mandela Bay Stadium, Port Elizabeth
19:00	Try: Devin Oosthuizen 4'; Tim Agaba 8'; Hannes Franklin 17'; Michael Killian 29'; Wayne Stevens 35', 57'; Thabo Mamojele 42'; Samora Fihlani 71', 76'; Con: Scott van Breda 5', 9', 18', 30', 36', 43', 58', 72', 77' (9/9); Cards: Charl du Plessis (yellow card) 20' to 30'	Scoreboard; Report	Try: Japie Nel 22'; Con: Inus Kritzinger 23' (1/1)	Referee: Marius Jonker

24 August 2013	Falcons	27–38	Leopards	Barnard Stadium, Kempton Park
15:00	Try: Kyle Hendricks 59', 72'; Franco Maritz 70'; Jongi Nokwe 80'; Con: Wesley Roberts 72' (1/3); Kyle Hendricks 80' (1/1); Pen: Jaun Kotzé 11' (1/2); Cards: JP Mostert (yellow card) 54' to 64'	Scoreboard; Report	Try: George Tossel 7'; Danie Dames 23'; Robert Kruger 30'; Luther Obi 43', 63'; Stoof Bezuidenhout 56'; Con: Adriaan Engelbrecht 7', 23', 30', 43' (4/6); Cards: Charl Weideman (yellow card) 35' to 46'; Robert Kruger (yellow card) 54' to 64'; Bernie van Rooyen (yellow card) 62' to 72'	Attendance: 300; Referee: Rasta Rasivhenge

24 August 2013	Boland Cavaliers	35–30	SWD Eagles	Boland Stadium, Wellington
16:00	Try: Franzel September 3'; Johnathan Francke 12'; Cheswin Williams 38'; Braam Gerber 58'; Con: Eric Zana 13', 39', 59' (3/4); Pen: Eric Zana 28', 66', 72' (3/3); Cards: Clemen Lewis (yellow card) 19' to 29'; Johnathan Francke (yellow card) 61' to 72'	Scoreboard; Report	Try: Martin Ferreira 24'; Alshaun Bock 35'; Clinton Wagman 41'; Grant le Roux 76'; Con: Justin van Staden 25' (1/3); Gerrit Smith 77' (1/1); Pen: Justin van Staden 6', 44' (2/3); Gerrit Smith (0/1)	Attendance: 820; Referee: Quinton Immelman

==== Round Ten ====
30 August 2013	Border Bulldogs	21–19	Boland Cavaliers	Buffalo City Stadium, East London
15:00	Try: Gareth Krause 20'; Spanner Pretorius 63'; Con: Dale Sabbagh 21' (1/2); Pen: Dale Sabbagh 6', 32', 52' (3/3); Cards: Sino Nyoka (yellow card) 59' to 69'	Scoreboard; Report	Try: PJ van Zyl 60'; Franzel September 73'; Con: Eric Zana (0/2); Pen: Eric Zana 9', 27', 38' (3/3)	Attendance: 500; Referee: Lourens van der Merwe

30 August 2013	Leopards	26–44	Eastern Province Kings	Olën Park, Potchefstroom
17:15	Try: Edgar Marutlulle 3'; Luther Obi 14'; George Tossel 47'; MB Lusaseni 59'; Con: Adriaan Engelbrecht 4', 48', 60' (3/4); Pen: Adriaan Engelbrecht (0/2)	Scoreboard; Report	Try: Cornell du Preez 24'; Samora Fihlani 31'; Michael Killian 38'; Tiger Mangweni 63'; Stefan Willemse 67', 74'; Con: Scott van Breda 32', 39', 64', 75' (4/6); Pen: Scott van Breda 1', 36' (2/2)	Attendance: 1,000; Referee: Tiaan Jonker

30 August 2013	SWD Eagles	58–42	Falcons	Outeniqua Park, George
19:00	Try: Alshaun Bock 6', 27'; Mzwanele Zito 16'; Roy Godfrey 43', 45'; Martin du Toit 65'; Hentzwill Pedro 70'; Layle Delo 76'; Con: Justin van Staden 7', 16', 43', 65', 70' (5/7); Martin du Toit 76' (1/1); Pen: Justin van Staden 34', 52' (2/2); Cards: Schalk Oelofse (yellow card) 20' to 30'	Scoreboard; Report	Try: Bruce Muller 2'; JP Mostert 12' penalty try 19'; Coert Cronjé 23'; Kyle Hendricks 36'; Wessel du Rand 73'; Con: Jaun Kotzé 3', 12', 20', 23', 36', 73' (6/6); Cards: Jacques Verwey (yellow card) 67' to 77'; Bruce Muller (yellow card) 69' to 79'	Referee: Marius Jonker

31 August 2013	Griffons	24–42	Pumas	North West Stadium, Welkom
15:00	Try: Martin Sithole 27'; Tertius Maarman 35', 68'; Freddy Ngoza 76'; Con: Inus Kritzinger (0/1); Joubert Engelbrecht 36', 68' (2/3); Pen: Inus Kritzinger (0/1); Cards: Tertius Maarman (yellow card) 5' to 15'	Scoreboard; Report	Try: Doppies le Roux 15'; Renaldo Bothma 32'; François du Toit 41'; Coenie van Wyk 58'; Corné Fourie 79'; Con: JC Roos 33', 41', 59' (3/4); Carl Bezuidenhout 80' (1/1); Pen: JC Roos 5', 39', 51' (3/3); Cards: Ivann Espag (yellow card) 27' to 37'; RW Kember (yellow card) 74'	Attendance: 100; Referee: Jason Jaftha

==== Round Eleven ====
6 September 2013	Eastern Province Kings	15–9	SWD Eagles	Nelson Mandela Bay Stadium, Port Elizabeth
19:00	Pen: Scott van Breda 15', 25', 60', 64', 72' (5/5)	Scoreboard; Report	Pen: Justin van Staden 38', 78' (2/2); Gerrit Smith (0/1); Drop: Justin van Staden 46' (1/1)	Attendance: 3,248; Referee: Lourens van der Merwe

6 September 2013	Pumas	38–20	Leopards	Mbombela Stadium, Mbombela
19:10	Try: Trompie Pretorius 22'; Coenie van Wyk 49'; Rosko Specman 51'; Corné Steenkamp 57'; Renaldo Bothma 66'; Con: JC Roos 23', 52' (2/5); Pen: JC Roos 9', 17', 30' (3/3); Cards: RW Kember (yellow card) 44' to 54'	Scoreboard; Report	Try: Luther Obi 68'; Jarryd Buys 82'; Con: Adriaan Engelbrecht 69', 83' (2/2); Pen: Adriaan Engelbrecht 12', 32' (2/3); Cards: Edmar Marais (yellow card) 5' to 16'	Referee: Jaco Peyper

7 September 2013	Falcons	28–21	Boland Cavaliers	Barnard Stadium, Kempton Park
15:00	Try: Bruce Muller 13', 64'; Willie Odendaal 34'; Jaun Kotzé 48'; Con: Jaun Kotzé 49' (1/4); Pen: Jaun Kotzé 28', 68' (2/2); Drop: Jaun Kotzé (0/1)	Scoreboard; Report	Try: Brendon April 6'; PJ van Zyl 60'; Junior Bester 78'; Con: Jacquin Jansen 7', 60', 78' (3/3)	Attendance: 150; Referee: Quinton Immelman

7 September 2013	Griffons	24–19	Border Bulldogs	North West Stadium, Welkom
15:00	Try: Norman Nelson 20'; Inus Kritzinger 37'; Japie Nel 52'; Tertius Daniller 73'; Con: Joubert Engelbrecht 38', 53' (2/4)	Scoreboard; Report	Try: Andrew van Wyk 32', 78'; Chumani Booi 40'; Con: Dale Sabbagh 33', 40' (2/2); Karlo Aspeling (0/1); Pen: Dale Sabbagh (0/1)	Attendance: 100; Referee: Jonathan Kaplan

==== Round Twelve ====
13 September 2013	Border Bulldogs	35–14	Falcons	Buffalo City Stadium, East London
15:00	Try: Dean Muir 53'; Dwayne Jenner 61'; Shannon Rick 70', 80'; Con: Dale Sabbagh 62', 71', 81' (3/4); Pen: Dale Sabbagh 15', 19', 56' (3/3)	Scoreboard; Report	Try: Anrich Richter 28', 31'; Con: Jaun Kotzé 29', 32' (2/2); Pen: Jaun Kotzé (0/1); Drop: Jaun Kotzé (0/1)	Referee: Jaco van Heerden

13 September 2013	Boland Cavaliers	19–40	Eastern Province Kings	Boland Stadium, Wellington
16:00	Try: Jason Kriel 65', 74'; Ulrich Pretorius 77'; Con: Eric Zana 66', 75' (2/2); Jacquin Jansen (0/1); Pen: Ricardo Croy (0/1)	Scoreboard; Report	Try: Michael Killian 5'; Brian Skosana 18' penalty try 29'; Stefan Willemse 42'; Steven Sykes 47'; Cornell du Preez 50'; Con: Scott van Breda 19', 30' (2/2); George Whitehead 43', 48', 51' (3/4); Cards: Scott van Breda (yellow card) 36' to 46'; Kayle van Zyl (yellow card) 71'	Attendance: 800; Referee: Jonathan Kaplan

13 September 2013	Leopards	40–33	Griffons	Olën Park, Potchefstroom
17:15	Try: Jarryd Buys 1'; Edmar Marais 7', 55'; Danie Dames 20'; Edgar Marutlulle 63'; Brendon Snyman 80'; Con: Jarryd Buys 2' (1/1); Adriaan Engelbrecht 8', 56', 64', 81' (4/5); Pen: Adriaan Engelbrecht (0/1); Cards: Robert Kruger (red card) 11'; Elardus Venter (yellow card) 53' to 64'	Scoreboard; Report	Try: Inus Kritzinger 14'; AJ le Roux 18', 58'; Norman Nelson 51'; Schalk van der Merwe 66'; Con: Franna du Toit 15', 19', 52', 67' (4/5); Pen: Franna du Toit (0/1)	Attendance: 150; Referee: Craig Joubert

13 September 2013	SWD Eagles	27–28	Pumas	Outeniqua Park, George
19:00	Try: Gerrit Smith 4'; Schalk Oelofse 25'; Con: Justin van Staden 26' (1/2); Pen: Justin van Staden 14', 20', 56', 64' (4/5); Drop: Justin van Staden 73' (1/1); Cards: Mzwanele Zito (yellow card) 78'	Scoreboard; Report	Try: Rosko Specman 16', 78'; Coenie van Wyk 52'; Con: JC Roos 17', 53' (2/3); Pen: JC Roos 1', 23', 80' (3/4); Cards: Corné Fourie (yellow card) 57' to 68'	Attendance: 2,000; Referee: Quinton Immelman

==== Round Thirteen ====
20 September 2013	Leopards	22–26	Border Bulldogs	Olën Park, Potchefstroom
17:15	Try: Danie Dames 10'; BG Uys 30', 49', 54'; Con: Adriaan Engelbrecht (0/3); Warren Gilbert 55' (1/1); Cards: Morné Hanekom (yellow card) 72'	Scoreboard; Report	Try: Khwezi Mkhafu 2'; Brian Shabangu 25'; Con: Dale Sabbagh 2', 26' (2/2); Pen: Dale Sabbagh 16', 34', 52', 72' (4/7); Cards: Rynardt van Wyk (yellow card) 59' to 70'	Attendance: 200; Referee: Jaco van Heerden

20 September 2013	Eastern Province Kings	30–23	Falcons	Nelson Mandela Bay Stadium, Port Elizabeth
19:00	Try: Stefan Willemse 2', 12'; Tiger Mangweni 53'; Con: Scott van Breda 3', 13', 54' (3/3); Pen: Scott van Breda 35', 46', 74' (3/3); Cards: Steven Sykes (yellow card) 29' to 39'	Scoreboard; Report	Try: Sandile Ngcobo 32'; Jaco Oosthuizen 37'; Con: Kyle Hendricks 33', 38' (2/2); Pen: Kyle Hendricks 4', 30', 44' (3/4); Cards: Brendan Rams (yellow card) 58' to 68'; MP van Eeden (yellow card) 76'	Attendance: 2,000; Referee: Jason Jaftha

21 September 2013	Griffons	28–51	SWD Eagles	North West Stadium, Welkom
15:00	Try: Martin Sithole 14', 76'; Japie Nel 28', 50'; Con: Franna du Toit 15', 29', 51' (3/3); Tertius Maarman 77' (1/1)	Scoreboard; Report	Try: Shaun Raubenheimer 1', 78'; Gerrit Smith 19'; Lyndon Hartnick 31', 79'; Mzo Dyantyi 40'; Jandré Blom 56'; Martin Ferreira 72'; Con: Gerrit Smith 2', 20', 40', 57' (4/6); Jandré Blom (0/2); Pen: Gerrit Smith 43' (1/1); Drop: Deroy Rhoode (0/1)	Attendance: 100; Referee: Craig Joubert

21 September 2013	Pumas	44–21	Boland Cavaliers	Mbombela Stadium, Mbombela
15:00	Try: Danwel Demas 2', 17'; Rudi Mathee 29'; Carl Bezuidenhout 42'; Reynier van Rooyen 48'; Uzair Cassiem 58'; Wilhelm Loock 80'; Con: Carl Bezuidenhout 3', 49', 59' (3/7); Pen: Carl Bezuidenhout 9' (1/1)	Scoreboard; Report	Try: Braam Gerber 24'; Ntando Kebe 51'; Johnathan Francke 70'; Con: Len Olivier 25', 52' (2/2); Eric Zana 71' (1/1)	Attendance: 760; Referee: Marius van der Westhuizen

==== Round Fourteen ====
27 September 2013	Boland Cavaliers	26–26	Griffons	Boland Stadium, Wellington
15:00	Try: Brendon April 20', 69', 78'; Rossouw Kruger 51'; Con: Len Olivier (0/1); Eric Zana 52', 70', 79' (3/3)	Scoreboard; Report	Try: Martin Sithole 24'; Japie Nel 29'; Norman Nelson 44'; Joubert Engelbrecht 61'; Con: Franna du Toit 25', 30', 45' (3/3); Joubert Engelbrecht (0/1)	Referee: Tiaan Jonker

27 September 2013	Border Bulldogs	20–38	Eastern Province Kings	Buffalo City Stadium, East London
15:00	Try: Dwayne Jenner 2'; Shane Spring 8'; Con: Dale Sabbagh 3', 9' (2/2); Pen: Dale Sabbagh 25', 40' (2/2); Cards: Dean Muir (yellow card) 20' to 31'	Scoreboard; Report	Try: George Whitehead 13', 20'; Steven Sykes 23'; Darron Nell 28'; Con: Scott van Breda 21', 24', 29' (3/4); Pen: Scott van Breda 48', 51', 64', 73' (4/5); Cards: Devin Oosthuizen (yellow card) 39' to 49'	Referee: Ben Crouse

27 September 2013	Falcons	17–67	Pumas	Barnard Stadium, Kempton Park
15:00	Try: JP Mostert 40', 71'; Birtie Powell 80'; Con: Kyle Hendricks 40' (1/3); Cards: Anrich Richter (yellow card) 63' to 73'	Scoreboard; Report	Try: JW Bell 8', 28'; Rosko Specman 11', 37', 44'; Doppies le Roux 49'; Ashwin Scott 60', 63', 66'; Stefan Watermeyer 75'; Con: Carl Bezuidenhout 10', 12', 29', 51', 60', 64', 67' (7/10); Pen: Carl Bezuidenhout 3' (1/1)	Attendance: 150; Referee: Lusanda Jam

27 September 2013	SWD Eagles	24–35	Leopards	Outeniqua Park, George
19:00	Try: Roy Godfrey 27'; Marshall Boesak 37'; Shaun Raubenheimer 59'; Con: Gerrit Smith 28', 38', 60' (3/3); Pen: Gerrit Smith 5' (1/1); Cards: Grant Kemp (yellow card) 34' to 41'	Scoreboard; Report	Try: Adriaan Engelbrecht 8'; Stompie de Wet 16', 35'; Danie Dames 23'; Johann Laker 40'; Brendon Snyman 52'; SJ Niemand 75'; Con: Adriaan Engelbrecht (0/7)	Attendance: 450; Referee: Lourens van der Merwe

=== Title Play-Off Games ===
==== Semi-finals ====
4 October 2013	Pumas	52–33	SWD Eagles	Mbombela Stadium, Mbombela
16:30	Try: Corné Steenkamp 13'; Stefan Watermeyer 38'; Coenie van Wyk 55'; RW Kember 61'; Renaldo Bothma 67'; Doppies le Roux 78'; Con: Carl Bezuidenhout 13', 39', 56', 62', 68' (5/6); Pen: Carl Bezuidenhout 9', 22', 48', 70' (4/4)	Scoreboard; Report	Try: Clinton Wagman 5'; Anver Venter 45'; Alshaun Bock 51'; Con: Justin van Staden 6', 46', 52' (3/3); Pen: Justin van Staden 11', 36', 40', 58' (4/4); Cards: Kabamba Floors (yellow card) 17' to 29'	Referee: Rasta Rasivhenge

4 October 2013	Eastern Province Kings	32–29 (aet)	Leopards	Nelson Mandela Bay Stadium, Port Elizabeth
16:30	Try: Tim Agaba 55'; Kayle van Zyl 95'; Con: Scott van Breda 56', 96' (2/2); Pen: Scott van Breda 3', 7', 32', 60', 77', 93' (6/7); Drop: George Whitehead (0/1)	Scoreboard; Report	Try: Edmar Marais 37'; Tiaan Dorfling 98'; Con: Adriaan Engelbrecht 38', 99' (2/2); Pen: Adriaan Engelbrecht 12', 23', 29', 74', 80' (5/6); Drop: Warren Gilbert (0/1); Cards: SJ Niemand (yellow card) 59' to 70'	Referee: Ben Crouse

==== Final ====
11 October 2013	Pumas	53–30	Eastern Province Kings	Mbombela Stadium, Mbombela
19:10	Try: RW Kember 18'; Coenie van Wyk 24', 46', 76'; JW Bell 66'; Renaldo Bothma 78'; Con: Carl Bezuidenhout 47', 67' (2/4); JC Roos 77', 79' (2/2); Pen: Carl Bezuidenhout 2', 30', 40', 51', 62' (5/6); Cards: Giant Mtyanda (yellow card) 70'; Doppies le Roux (yellow card) 72'	Scoreboard Report	Try: Ntabeni Dukisa 54' penalty try 72'; Kayle van Zyl 81'; Con: Scott van Breda 55', 73', 81' (3/3); Pen: Scott van Breda 4', 27', 33' (3/3); Drop: George Whitehead (0/1)	Referee: Craig Joubert

2013 Absa Currie Cup
First Division Champions
Pumas
3rd title

== Promotion/relegation games ==
=== Log ===
2013 Currie Cup promotion/relegation games
Pos	Team	Pld	W	D	L	PF	PA	PD	TF	TA	TB	LB	Pts	Promotion or relegation
1	Pumas (P)	2	1	0	1	52	36	+16	4	3	0	1	5	2014 Currie Cup Premier Division
2	Griquas (R)	2	1	0	1	36	52	−16	3	4	0	0	4	2014 Currie Cup First Division

Rules for classification: 4 points for a win; 2 points for a draw; 1 bonus point for a loss by seven points or less; 1 bonus point for scoring four or more tries in a match
(P) Promoted; (R) Relegated

=== Results ===
18 October 2013	Griquas	21–19	Pumas	Griqua Park, Kimberley
19:10	Try: Carel Greeff 56' c Jean Stemmet 61' c Marnus Schoeman 79' c Con: Gouws Prinsloo (3/3) 57', 62', 80'	Scoreboard	Try: Wilmaure Louw 22' c Con: Carl Bezuidenhout (1/1) 22'; Pen: Carl Bezuidenhout (2/2) 3', 10'; JC Roos (2/2) 65', 73'; Cards: Giant Mtyanda (yellow card) 79'	Referee: Jonathan Kaplan

25 October 2013	Pumas	33–15	Griquas	Mbombela Stadium, Mbombela
19:10	Try: Stefan Watermeyer 4' c penalty try 51' c Roscko Speckman 77' c Con: JC Roos (3/3) 5', 52', 78'; Pen: JC Roos (3/5) 18', 22', 71'; Drop: JC Roos (1/1) 37'; Cards: Renaldo Bothma (yellow card) 23' to 34'	Scoreboard	Pen: Gouws Prinsloo (5/6) 3', 13', 24', 34', 66'; Cards: Jean Stemmet (yellow card) 51' to 62'	Referee: Craig Joubert

== Players ==
=== Player statistics ===
The following table contain points which have been scored in competitive games in the 2013 Currie Cup First Division.

All point scorers
No	Player	Team	T	C	P	DG	Pts
1	Carl Bezuidenhout	Pumas	3	47	35	1	217
2	Adriaan Engelbrecht	Leopards	2	43	19	0	153
3	Scott van Breda	Eastern Province Kings	1	27	29	0	146
4	Justin van Staden	SWD Eagles	1	25	26	2	139
5	Jaun Kotzé	Falcons	3	21	7	4	90
6	Alshaun Bock	SWD Eagles	17	0	0	0	85
7	Louis Strydom	Griffons	0	15	14	1	75
8	Dale Sabbagh	Border Bulldogs	0	11	17	0	73
9	Eric Zana	Boland Cavaliers	1	18	8	0	65
10	JC Roos	Falcons & Pumas	0	16	10	0	62
11	Edmar Marais	Leopards	11	0	0	0	55
11	Rosko Specman	Pumas	11	0	0	0	55
13	JW Bell	Pumas	10	0	0	0	50
14	Coenie van Wyk	Pumas	9	0	0	0	45
15	Ntabeni Dukisa	Eastern Province Kings	2	5	7	1	44
16	Gerrit Smith	SWD Eagles	3	11	2	0	43
17	RW Kember	Pumas	8	0	0	0	40
17	Japie Nel	Griffons	8	0	0	0	40
17	Luther Obi	Leopards	8	0	0	0	40
20	Len Olivier	Boland Cavaliers	0	10	6	0	38
21	Brendon April	Boland Cavaliers	7	0	0	0	35
21	Willie Odendaal	Falcons	7	0	0	0	35
23	Wesley Dunlop	Eastern Province Kings	1	4	7	0	34
24	Karlo Aspeling	Border Bulldogs	1	5	5	1	33
25	Kyle Hendricks	Falcons	3	4	3	0	32
25	Wesley Roberts	Falcons	1	6	5	0	32
27	Jeff Taljard	SWD Eagles	1	10	2	0	31
28	Danie Dames	Leopards	6	0	0	0	30
28	Inus Kritzinger	Griffons	4	5	0	0	30
28	Edgar Marutlulle	Leopards	6	0	0	0	30
28	Mpho Mbiyozo	Eastern Province Kings	6	0	0	0	30
28	Anrich Richter	Falcons	6	0	0	0	30
33	Jacquin Jansen	Boland Cavaliers	4	3	0	0	26
34	Roy Godfrey	SWD Eagles	5	0	0	0	25
34	Shaun Raubenheimer	SWD Eagles	5	0	0	0	25
34	Andrew van Wyk	Border Bulldogs	5	0	0	0	25
34	Stefan Willemse	Eastern Province Kings	5	0	0	0	25
38	Tertius Maarman	Griffons	4	2	0	0	24
39	Jarryd Buys	Leopards	4	1	0	0	22
40	Renaldo Bothma	Pumas	4	0	0	0	20
40	Coert Cronjé	Falcons	4	0	0	0	20
40	Franna du Toit	Griffons	0	10	0	0	20
40	Braam Gerber	Boland Cavaliers	4	0	0	0	20
40	Werner Griesel	Griffons	4	0	0	0	20
40	Michael Killian	Eastern Province Kings	4	0	0	0	20
40	Johann Laker	Leopards	4	0	0	0	20
40	JP Mostert	Falcons	4	0	0	0	20
40	Jongi Nokwe	Falcons	4	0	0	0	20
40	Franzel September	Boland Cavaliers	4	0	0	0	20
40	Martin Sithole	Griffons	4	0	0	0	20
40	Corné Steenkamp	Pumas	4	0	0	0	20
40	George Tossel	Leopards	4	0	0	0	20
40	PJ van Zyl	Boland Cavaliers	4	0	0	0	20
40	Clinton Wagman	SWD Eagles	4	0	0	0	20
40	Stefan Watermeyer	Pumas	4	0	0	0	20
40	George Whitehead	Eastern Province Kings	2	5	0	0	20
57	Joubert Engelbrecht	Griffons	1	5	1	0	18
58	Jaco Bouwer	Pumas	3	0	0	0	15
58	Uzair Cassiem	Pumas	3	0	0	0	15
58	Danwel Demas	Griffons & Pumas	3	0	0	0	15
58	Christo du Plessis	SWD Eagles	3	0	0	0	15
58	Martin du Toit	SWD Eagles	3	0	0	0	15
58	Martin Ferreira	SWD Eagles	3	0	0	0	15
58	Samora Fihlani	Eastern Province Kings	3	0	0	0	15
58	Johnathan Francke	Boland Cavaliers	3	0	0	0	15
58	Morné Hanekom	Leopards	3	0	0	0	15
58	Frank Herne	Pumas	3	0	0	0	15
58	Zandré Jordaan	Boland Cavaliers	3	0	0	0	15
58	Doppies le Roux	Pumas	3	0	0	0	15
58	Tiger Mangweni	Eastern Province Kings	3	0	0	0	15
58	Khwezi Mkhafu	Border Bulldogs	3	0	0	0	15
58	Bruce Muller	Falcons	3	0	0	0	15
58	Norman Nelson	Griffons	3	0	0	0	15
58	Trompie Pretorius	Pumas	3	0	0	0	15
58	Ashwin Scott	Pumas	3	0	0	0	15
58	Brendon Snyman	Leopards	3	0	0	0	15
58	Siviwe Soyizwapi	Eastern Province Kings	3	0	0	0	15
58	Wayne Stevens	Eastern Province Kings	3	0	0	0	15
58	Steven Sykes	Eastern Province Kings	3	0	0	0	15
58	BG Uys	Leopards	3	0	0	0	15
58	Cheswin Williams	Boland Cavaliers	3	0	0	0	15
82	Quinton Crocker	Border Bulldogs	2	2	0	0	14
83	Tiaan Marx	Pumas	1	2	1	0	12
83	Kayle van Zyl	Eastern Province Kings	2	1	0	0	12
85	Tim Agaba	Eastern Province Kings	2	0	0	0	10
85	Chumani Booi	Border Bulldogs	2	0	0	0	10
85	Tertius Daniller	Griffons	2	0	0	0	10
85	Aidon Davis	Eastern Province Kings	2	0	0	0	10
85	Stompie de Wet	Leopards	2	0	0	0	10
85	Cornell du Preez	Eastern Province Kings	2	0	0	0	10
85	Corné Fourie	Pumas	2	0	0	0	10
85	Boetie Groenewald	Griffons	2	0	0	0	10
85	Lyndon Hartnick	SWD Eagles	2	0	0	0	10
85	Dwayne Jenner	Border Bulldogs	2	0	0	0	10
85	Jeremy Jordaan	Griffons	2	0	0	0	10
85	Jason Kriel	Boland Cavaliers	2	0	0	0	10
85	AJ le Roux	Griffons	2	0	0	0	10
85	Jacques Momberg	Pumas	2	0	0	0	10
85	Giant Mtyanda	Pumas	2	0	0	0	10
85	Dean Muir	Border Bulldogs	2	0	0	0	10
85	Ossie Nortjé	Griffons	2	0	0	0	10
85	Ulrich Pretorius	Boland Cavaliers	2	0	0	0	10
85	Shannon Rick	Border Bulldogs	2	0	0	0	10
85	Brian Shabangu	Border Bulldogs	2	0	0	0	10
85	Hennie Skorbinski	Leopards	2	0	0	0	10
85	Shane Spring	Border Bulldogs	2	0	0	0	10
85	Nicky Steyn	Griffons	2	0	0	0	10
85	Senan van der Merwe	Boland Cavaliers	2	0	0	0	10
85	Eduan van der Walt	Pumas	2	0	0	0	10
85	Rynardt van Wyk	Border Bulldogs	2	0	0	0	10
85	Mzwanele Zito	SWD Eagles	2	0	0	0	10
112	Cecil Dumond	Border Bulldogs	0	2	1	0	7
112	Marlou van Niekerk	Eastern Province Kings	1	1	0	0	7
114	JC Astle	Boland Cavaliers	1	0	0	0	5
114	Junior Bester	Boland Cavaliers	1	0	0	0	5
114	Stoof Bezuidenhout	Leopards	1	0	0	0	5
114	Jandré Blom	SWD Eagles	1	0	0	0	5
114	Marshall Boesak	SWD Eagles	1	0	0	0	5
114	Rinus Bothma	Falcons	1	0	0	0	5
114	Marnus Briedenhann	Griffons	1	0	0	0	5
114	Dalton Davis	Eastern Province Kings	1	0	0	0	5
114	Bovril de Bruin	Falcons	1	0	0	0	5
114	Layle Delo	SWD Eagles	1	0	0	0	5
114	Tiaan Dorfling	Leopards	1	0	0	0	5
114	Martin Dreyer	Leopards	1	0	0	0	5
114	Wessel du Rand	Falcons	1	0	0	0	5
114	François du Toit	Pumas	1	0	0	0	5
114	Mzo Dyantyi	SWD Eagles	1	0	0	0	5
114	Chris Ehlers	Griffons	1	0	0	0	5
114	Kabamba Floors	SWD Eagles	1	0	0	0	5
114	Hannes Franklin	Eastern Province Kings	1	0	0	0	5
114	Ross Geldenhuys	Eastern Province Kings	1	0	0	0	5
114	Stephan Gerber	Border Bulldogs	1	0	0	0	5
114	Siyanda Grey	Eastern Province Kings	1	0	0	0	5
114	Vince Gwavu	Falcons	1	0	0	0	5
114	Elandré Huggett	Griffons	1	0	0	0	5
114	Neill Jacobs	Border Bulldogs	0	1	1	0	5
114	Ntando Kebe	Boland Cavaliers	1	0	0	0	5
114	Grant Kemp	SWD Eagles	1	0	0	0	5
114	Shane Kirkwood	Falcons	1	0	0	0	5
114	Vincent Koch	Pumas	1	0	0	0	5
114	Lehan Koekemoer	Griffons	1	0	0	0	5
114	Gareth Krause	Border Bulldogs	1	0	0	0	5
114	Robert Kruger	Leopards	1	0	0	0	5
114	Rossouw Kruger	Boland Cavaliers	1	0	0	0	5
114	Blake Kyd	Border Bulldogs	1	0	0	0	5
114	Erik le Roux	Griffons	1	0	0	0	5
114	Grant le Roux	SWD Eagles	1	0	0	0	5
114	Clemen Lewis	Boland Cavaliers	1	0	0	0	5
114	Wilhelm Loock	Pumas	1	0	0	0	5
114	MB Lusaseni	Leopards	1	0	0	0	5
114	Sylvian Mahuza	Leopards	1	0	0	0	5
114	Thabo Mamojele	Eastern Province Kings	1	0	0	0	5
114	Franco Maritz	Falcons	1	0	0	0	5
114	Rudi Mathee	Pumas	1	0	0	0	5
114	Dumisani Meslane	SWD Eagles	1	0	0	0	5
114	Stairs Mhlongo	Border Bulldogs	1	0	0	0	5
114	Darron Nell	Eastern Province Kings	1	0	0	0	5
114	Sandile Ngcobo	Falcons	1	0	0	0	5
114	Freddy Ngoza	Griffons	1	0	0	0	5
114	SJ Niemand	Leopards	1	0	0	0	5
114	Schalk Oelofse	SWD Eagles	1	0	0	0	5
114	Devin Oosthuizen	Eastern Province Kings	1	0	0	0	5
114	Jaco Oosthuizen	Falcons	1	0	0	0	5
114	Hadleigh Parkes	Eastern Province Kings	1	0	0	0	5
114	Buran Parks	SWD Eagles	1	0	0	0	5
114	Hentzwill Pedro	SWD Eagles	1	0	0	0	5
114	Wynand Pienaar	Boland Cavaliers	1	0	0	0	5
114	Birtie Powell	Falcons	1	0	0	0	5
114	Spanner Pretorius	Border Bulldogs	1	0	0	0	5
114	Brian Skosana	Eastern Province Kings	1	0	0	0	5
114	HP Swart	Leopards	1	0	0	0	5
114	Matthew Taljard	Border Bulldogs	1	0	0	0	5
114	De-Jay Terblanche	Pumas	1	0	0	0	5
114	Derick van Heerden	Griffons	1	0	0	0	5
114	Schalk van der Merwe	Griffons	1	0	0	0	5
114	Reynier van Rooyen	Pumas	1	0	0	0	5
114	Chrislyn van Schalkwyk	Border Bulldogs	1	0	0	0	5
114	Anver Venter	SWD Eagles	1	0	0	0	5
114	Nicolás Vergallo	Eastern Province Kings	1	0	0	0	5
181	Warren Gilbert	Leopards	0	1	0	0	2
* Legend: T = Tries, C = Conversions, P = Penalties, DG = Drop Goals, Pts = Points

== See also ==
- 2013 Currie Cup Premier Division
- 2013 Vodacom Cup
- 2013 Under-21 Provincial Championship
- 2013 Under-19 Provincial Championship
