= 2019 Gold Cup (rugby union) =

Rugby Sports

- Countries: South Africa
- Date: 9 March – 14 April 2019

The 2019 Gold Cup — officially known as the SSG Gold Cup, presented by Blu Approved and M4Jam for sponsorship reasons — was the 2019 edition of the Gold Cup, an annual rugby union competition held in South Africa between the top non-university club teams of the South African Rugby Union's constituent provincial unions. The competition was the third edition of the competition since its name change in 2016 and the sixth edition since it was launched as the Community Cup in 2013.

SARU restored the competition to the early-year time-slot it occupied from 2013 to 2015 — which resulted the competition taking a hiatus in 2018 – and was scheduled for 9 March to 14 April 2019. In an additional change from the 2017 edition, the amount of participating teams were reduced from 20 to 16, with one spot going to each of the fourteen provincial unions, one spot to the Limpopo Blue Bulls sub-union and the final spot went to a wildcard entry.

== Competition rules and information ==
There were sixteen participating teams in the 2019 Gold Cup, divided into four pools of four teams. Each team played all the other teams in their pool during the pool stage, either at home or away. Teams received four log points for a win and two log points for a draw. Bonus log points were awarded to teams that scored four or more tries in a game, as well as to teams that lost a match by seven points or less. Teams were ranked by log points, then points difference (points scored less points conceded).

The top two teams in each pool after the pool stage qualified for the quarterfinals. The quarterfinal winners qualified to the semifinals, and the semifinal winners to the final.

== Teams ==
Location of teams in the 2019 Gold Cup
2019 Gold Cup (rugby union) is located in South Africa
| Gauteng | Western Cape |
| 2019 Gold Cup (rugby union) is located in Gauteng | 2019 Gold Cup (rugby union) is located in Western Cape |
Teams in the 2019 Gold Cup Pool A, Pool B, Pool C and Pool D

The teams that qualified for the 2019 Gold Cup were confirmed by SARU on 14 November 2018. In addition to the fifteen teams that qualified from each provincial union, East Rand United were included as a wildcard team. The participating teams are:

2019 Gold Cup teams
| Team | Sponsored Name | Union | Pool |
|---|---|---|---|
| Bloemfontein Police | Recall Security Bloemfontein Police | Free State | Pool C |
| College Rovers | College Rovers | KwaZulu-Natal | Pool B |
| Durbanville-Bellville | Durbanville-Bellville | Western Province | Pool A |
| East Rand United | Phakisa Holdings East Rand United | Valke | Pool B |
| Gardens | Multisure Gardens | Eastern Province | Pool B |
| Naka Bulls | ABE Midas Naka Bulls | Blue Bulls | Pool C |
| Northam Rhinos | Northam Platinum Rhinos | Limpopo Blue Bulls | Pool A |
| Progress | Stiles Progress George | SWD | Pool A |
| Roodepoort | Rototank Roodepoort | Golden Lions | Pool D |
| Rustenburg Impala | Newrak Rustenburg Impala | Leopards | Pool D |
| Sasol | Sasol Digi Mag Secunda | Mpumalanga | Pool B |
| Sishen | CT Hydraulics Sishen | Griquas | Pool C |
| Springs | KWV Springs | Valke | Pool D |
| Swallows | Hollywoodbets Swallows | Border | Pool D |
| Villagers Worcester | Onelogix United Bulk Worcester Villagers | Boland | Pool A |
| Welkom | Welkom | Griffons | Pool C |

== Pool stage ==
=== Pool A ===
==== Log ====
2019 Gold Cup Pool A log
| Pos | Team | P | W | D | L | PF | PA | PD | TF | TA | TB | LB | Pts |
|---|---|---|---|---|---|---|---|---|---|---|---|---|---|
| 1 | Northam Rhinos | 3 | 3 | 0 | 0 | 124 | 94 | 30 | 10 | 11 | 3 | 0 | 15 |
| 2 | Durbanville-Bellville | 3 | 2 | 0 | 1 | 127 | 64 | 63 | 10 | 5 | 2 | 1 | 7 |
| 3 | Progress | 3 | 1 | 0 | 2 | 61 | 109 | -48 | 5 | 9 | 1 | 0 | 5 |
| 4 | Villagers Worcester | 3 | 0 | 0 | 3 | 68 | 133 | -65 | 10 | 10 | 2 | 2 | 4 |

==== Matches ====
| 9 March 2019 | OneLogix United Bulk Villagers Worcester | 40 – 41 | Northam Platinum Rhinos |
| 15:00 | | Scoreboard |

| 9 March 2019 | Stiles Progress George | 7 – 35 | Durbanville-Bellville |
| | | Scoreboard |

| 16 March 2019 | Durbanville-Bellville | 33 – 37 | Northam Platinum Rhinos |
| | | Scoreboard |

| 16 March 2019 | Stiles Progress George | 33 – 28 | OneLogix United Bulk Villagers Worcester |
| | | Scoreboard |

| 23 March 2019 | Northam Platinum Rhinos | 46 – 21 | Stiles Progress George |
| | | Scoreboard |

| 23 March 2019 | OneLogix United Bulk Villagers Worcester | 20 – 59 | Durbanville-Bellville |
| | | Scoreboard |

=== Pool B ===
==== Log ====
2019 Gold Cup Pool B log
| Pos | Team | P | W | D | L | PF | PA | PD | TF | TA | TB | LB | Pts |
|---|---|---|---|---|---|---|---|---|---|---|---|---|---|
| 1 | College Rovers | 3 | 2 | 0 | 1 | 91 | 17 | 74 | 10 | 4 | 3 | 1 | 11 |
| 2 | Gardens | 3 | 2 | 0 | 1 | 81 | 79 | 2 | 6 | 7 | 2 | 1 | 11 |
| 3 | East Rand United | 3 | 1 | 0 | 2 | 75 | 95 | -20 | 5 | 9 | 2 | 1 | 7 |
| 4 | Sasol | 3 | 1 | 0 | 2 | 58 | 75 | -17 | 6 | 7 | 0 | 0 | 4 |

==== Matches ====
| 9 March 2019 | Multisure Gardens | 14 – 19 | Sasol Digi Mag Secunda |
| 15:00 | | Scoreboard |

| 9 March 2019 | College Rovers | 36 – 9 | Phakisa Holdings East Rand United |
| 15:00 | | Scoreboard |

| 16 March 2019 | Phakisa Holdings East Rand United | 34 – 22 | Sasol Digi Mag Secunda |
| | | Scoreboard |

| 16 March 2019 | Multisure Gardens | 30 – 28 | College Rovers |
| | | Scoreboard |

| 23 March 2019 | Phakisa Holdings East Rand United | 32 – 37 | Multisure Gardens |
| | | Scoreboard |

| 23 March 2019 | Sasol Digi Mag Secunda | 17 – 27 | College Rovers |
| | | Scoreboard |

=== Pool C ===
==== Log ====
2019 Gold Cup Pool C log
| Pos | Team | P | W | D | L | PF | PA | PD | TF | TA | TB | LB | Pts |
|---|---|---|---|---|---|---|---|---|---|---|---|---|---|
| 1 | Naka Bulls | 3 | 3 | 0 | 0 | 182 | 43 | 139 | 17 | 6 | 3 | 0 | 15 |
| 2 | Welkom | 3 | 2 | 0 | 1 | 75 | 56 | 19 | 6 | 5 | 2 | 0 | 10 |
| 3 | Bloemfontein Police | 3 | 1 | 0 | 2 | 43 | 95 | -59 | 6 | 15 | 1 | 1 | 6 |
| 4 | Sishen | 3 | 0 | 0 | 3 | 56 | 96 | -40 | 5 | 8 | 1 | 0 | 1 |

==== Matches ====
| 9 March 2019 | ABE Midas Naka Bulls | 46 – 31 | CT Hydraulics Sishen | Loftus Versfeld |
| 15:00 | | Scoreboard |

| 9 March 2019 | Welkom | 31 – 25 | Recall Security Bloemfontein Police |
| 15:00 | | Scoreboard |

| 16 March 2019 | CT Hydraulics Sishen | 10 – 23 | Recall Security Bloemfontein Police |
| | | Scoreboard |

| 16 March 2019 | ABE Midas Naka Bulls | 70 – 12 | Welkom |
| | | Scoreboard |

| 23 March 2019 | Recall Security Bloemfontein Police | 0 – 66 | ABE Midas Naka Bulls |
| | | Scoreboard |

| 23 March 2019 | Welkom | 27 – 15 | CT Hydraulics Sishen |
| | | Scoreboard |

=== Pool D ===
==== Log ====
2019 Gold Cup Pool D log
| Pos | Team | P | W | D | L | PF | PA | PD | TF | TA | TB | LB | Pts |
|---|---|---|---|---|---|---|---|---|---|---|---|---|---|
| 1 | Rustenburg Impala | 3 | 3 | 0 | 0 | 153 | 29 | 124 | 12 | 9 | 3 | 0 | 15 |
| 2 | Swallows | 3 | 2 | 0 | 1 | 88 | 72 | 16 | 7 | 6 | 2 | 1 | 11 |
| 3 | Roodepoort | 3 | 1 | 0 | 2 | 93 | 121 | -28 | 10 | 12 | 1 | 1 | 6 |
| 4 | Springs | 3 | 0 | 0 | 3 | 76 | 121 | -45 | 6 | 8 | 3 | 1 | 4 |

==== Matches ====
| 9 March 2019 | Rototank Roodepoort | 31 – 52 | Newrak Rustenburg Impala | Ruimsig Stadium |
| 15:00 | | Scoreboard |

| 9 March 2019 | KWV Springs | 13 – 17 | Hollywoodbets Swallows |
| 15:00 | | Scoreboard |

| 16 March 2019 | RotoTank Roodepoort | 41 – 34 | KWV Springs | Ellis Park Stadium |
| | | Scoreboard |

| 16 March 2019 | Newrak Rustenburg Impala | 38 – 36 | Hollywoodbets Swallows | Impala Rugby Club |
| | | Scoreboard |

| 23 March 2019 | Hollywoodbets Swallows | 35 – 21 | Rototank Roodepoort |
| | | Scoreboard |

| 23 March 2019 | KWV Springs | 29 – 63 | Newrak Rustenburg Impala |
| | | Scoreboard |

== Play-offs ==
=== Quarterfinals ===
| 30 March 2019 | College Rovers | 24 – 36 | Durbanville-Bellville |
| | | Scoreboard |

| 30 March 2019 | ABE Midas Naka Bulls | 10 – 13 | Hollywoodbets Swallows |
| | | Scoreboard |

| 30 March 2019 | Northam Platinum Rhinos | 35 – 29 | Multisure Gardens Uitenhage |
| | | Scoreboard |

| 30 March 2019 | Newrak Rustenburg Impala | 48 – 19 | Welkom | Impala Rugby Club |
| | | Scoreboard |

=== Semifinals ===
| 6 April 2019 | Durbanville-Bellville | 47 – 24 | Hollywoodbets Swallows |
| | | Scoreboard |

| 6 April 2019 | Newrak Rustenburg Impala | 36 – 20 | Northam Platinum Rhinos | Impala Rugby Club |
| | | Scoreboard |

=== Final ===
| 14 April 2019 | Newrak Rustenburg Impala | 37 – 31 | Durbanville-Bellville | Impala Rugby Club |
| | | Scoreboard |

== Squads ==
The following squads were named for the 2019 Gold Cup:

Bloemfontein Police squad
Players

Jeandré Atkinson • Donavan Ball • Francois Bezuidenhout • Pieter Faber • Kay-Kay Hlongwane • Stefan Jacobs • Sisonke Makapela • Fiffy Rampeta • Ollie Saayman • Gerrit Smith • Tjoep Steyn • Branden Terblanche • Lebohang Tsoeu • Wakie van Wyngard • Luthando Dludla

College Rovers squad
Players

Brandon Bailing • Molotsi Bouwer • Cullen Collopy • Alrin Eksteen • Brian Habbick • Alcino Izaacs • Curtis Jonas • Denham Leo Fosteras • MB Lusaseni • Khaya Majola • Charles Mayeza • Stairs Mhlongo • Zee Mkhabela • Njabulo Mkize • Sandile Kubeka • Mesuli Mncwango • Minenhle Mthethwa • Wandré Nortje • Lusko Nyabaza • Sino Nyoka • Liam O'Connell • Hendrik Prinsloo • Inny Radebe • Mark Richards • Monwabisi Sanele Pina • Luciando Santos • Gavin Scott • Brian Shabangu • Damian Stevens • Kyle Theron • Sergio Torrens • Byron van der Nest • Marthinus Volker • Adam Wessels

Durbanville-Bellville squad
Players

Daneel Hermann Botes • Arend Daniel Jacobus Brink • Angus Cleophas • Johannes Christoffel Conradie • Brendon Esterhuizen • Dalen Kristan Sylvain Goliath • Wiaan Griebenow • Juan Janco Gunter • Charl Jansen • Lance Jurgens • Ashley Kohler • Ruan Geustyn Laubscher • Gerdwill le Fleur • Basil Liebenberg • Karl Liebenberg • Robbie Louw • Edward Derrick Marais • Roderick Moses • Niel Oelofse • Raymond Herbert Olivier • Andrew Picoto • Stephen Potgieter • Tiaan Radyn • Pieter Johannes Jacobus Smith • Hanekom Gerrit Stofberg • Etienne Swarts • Gideon Francois Thiart • Carl Francois Truter • Erasmus Albertus van der Linde • Christoffel Johannes van Niekerk • Andries Conrad van Staden • Jean Phillip Viviers • Craig Walker

East Rand United squad
Players

Kholekile Bakumeni • Jonathan Botha • Hannriël Coetzee • Michael Daniel de Lange • Clayton Gindan • Jaco Herselman • Morné Jansen • Calvin Jantjies • Jackie Jonkers • Saki Klaas • Johan Kruger • Jedson la Grange • Brandon Lee Haywood • Cameron Lentoor • Peter Mnguni • André Myburgh • Sibongile Njomba • Vuyisile Nqweniso • Tinus Oosthuysen • Donique Perries • Kevin Plaatjies • Leon Potgieter • Tiaan Ramat • Cameron Rooi • Tyrone Schaper • Stanley Stewart • Khahliso Thabana • Waylon Thompson • Jacques van Tonder • Dirk van Wyk

Gardens squad
Players

Ouza Arends • Chevandrey Barney • Riaan Bayman • Denvor Bonaparte • Kirwan Ceaser • Ruben de Vos • Bakkies Dlwengu • Yster Dlwengu • Margo Felix • Craig Ferreira • Nathal Forbes • Lukhona Gans • Elgin Grady • Joggie Jansen • Davian Josias • Marvin Kampher • Denino Ketchum • Marlon Lewis • Renaldo Lewis • Ruvern Louw • Cherwin Lovemore • Andile Maart • Ayanda Nogampula • Ashhy Oelse • Dwayne Prince • Dylan Steenkamp • Donavan Stevens • Clyde Theron • Colin Webb • Oom Blerr Williams • Zakes Zana • Vinny Zinto

Naka Bulls squad
| Players | Jean Pierre Alberts • Jerome Bastick • Anton Beswick • Frans Botha • Adriaan Britz • Lawrence Cleminson • Ewan Coetzee • Christoff Craill • Gustav de Jager • Dirk Dippenaar • Ruaan du Preez • Jean Grobler • Ruan Grundelingh • Rickert Korff • Kefentse Mahlo • Danny Mokhoabane • Pule Molokomme • Altus Momsen • Diederik Frederik Oberholzer • Jonathan O'Niel • Kyle Pieterse • Ig Prinsloo • Adré Smith • Etienne Storm • Luga van Biljon • Juan van der Westhuizen • Ian van Deventer • Sango Xamlashe |

Northam squad
Players

Ashwill Adams • Jimmy Baloyi • Gerdus Botha • Alvin Brandt • Zander de Kock • Cecil Dumond • Josh Finlay • Hashiem Gasant • Robin Goliath • Patrick Hattingh • Wiehan Koen • Polly Lindenberg • Wortel Loots • Attie Louw • Tiny Masemola • Sam Mcetywa • Tyson Mulamba • Bruce Muller • Ruben Opperman • Jaap Pienaar • Donovan Pieters • Ben Sekgobela • Dean Stokes • Odwa Tinise • Sidney Tobias • Ethin van Niekerk • Ruan Venter • Estehan Visagie • Percy Williams • Jacobus Wouter de Villiers

Progress squad
Players

Barend Alexander • André Barnardo • Bredni Bestenbier • Brianton Booysen • Carlton Coeries • Declan Coetzee • Taswin da Silva • Austin de Bruyn • Mzo Dyantyi • Ronaldo Fortuin • Fizell Fredericks • Jaydon Fredericks • Alvin George • Xavier Grant Scholtz • Stefaan Grundlingh • Kirsten Heyns • Werner Jacobs • Gerrin Jansen • André Jantjies • Chumani Kema • Chazlin Lamini • Justin Levendal • Mac Muller • Ossie Nortjé • Leono Oosthuizen • Wendell Pondo • Shaun Raubenheimer • Jade Roelfse • Enrico Saaiers • Jonathan Simons • Deon Stoffels • Nigel Theron • Clinton Wagman • Ethan Williams • Eric Zana

Roodepoort squad
Players

Ori Abutbul • Marnus Coetzee • Migael du Plessis • François du Toit • Fransisco du Toit • Ruan du Toit • Bernard Erasmus • André Esterhuizen • Selom Gavor • Duan Geldenhuys • Stokkies Hanekom • Terrance Longworth • Derrick Lottering • Gabriel Luyt • Johannes Maree • Rudi Marx • Pieter Matthews • Carl Mellet • Mabutho Mongwe • Tristan Moses • Lux Ntsepe • Ian Pottas • Quinton Pretorius • Wesley Pretorius • Yahka Quinela • Brandon Rick • Wesley Roberts • Rodney Robinson • Gideon Roux • Zander Slemmer • Johan Swart • Louis Trichardt • Thifhidzi Tshivhase • Kalla van Heerden • Astley van Wyk • Griffith van Wyk • Clifford Vermaak

Rustenburg Impala squad
Players

Dirk Johannes Jacobus Botha • Marius Breytenbach • Gerhard Cloete • JP Coetzee • Brandon de Beer • Isak Deetlefs • Leon du Plessis • Mcdonald Duma • André Engelbrecht • Ivann Espag • André Grobler • Dewaldt Havenga • Hendrik Huyser • Nico Kruger • Stefan Kruger • Jean-Pierre le Grange • Siyabonga Masuku • Dumisani Matyeshana • Congo Mndoda • Itumeleng Mpete • Tiaan Nel • Xolani Nkosi • Andries Olivier • Nico Peyper • Tiaan Prinsloo • Robert Rawlins • Ethan Sias • Mliqi Simanga • Justin St Jerry • Francois van Biljon • Dean van der Merwe • Maverick van der Merwe • Boris van Jaarsveld • Gysbert van Wyk • Marius von Moltke • Johnny Welthagen • Justin Wheeler • Chaney Willemse

Sasol squad
Players

Jacobus Beylefeldt • Fanie Booysen • Dandré Brand • Calvin Clack • Neels Els • Tyrone Ferreira • Anwar Fillis • Izan Green • Tiaan Habig • Steven Jacobs • Sweis Jacobs • Dirk Lowies • Willa Martin • Tiaan Moore • Eddi Mphuthi • HJ Neethling • Hanco Nel • Pottie Potgieter • Wian Prinsloo • Andre Shwab • Dalton Smit • Jurgen Steinbach • Ruan van der Colff • Steyn van der Heever • Markus van der Linde • Llewellyn van der Linde-Botha • Johan van der Merwe • Jannie van der Merwe • Marinus van der Merwe • Mike van Vuren • Lennie Vergottini • Berty Visser • Evan Wessels • Christiaan Wessels

Sishen squad
| Players | Byron Booysen • Augusto Chiula • Tiaan Dippenaar • Donovan Erasmus • Marthinus Erasmus • Paulo Ernesto • Jacques Grobler • Warren Hart • Louis Hayward • Lenith Isaacs • Kobus Kalp • Ivandre Knoetze • Jadee Linken La-Meyer • Johannes Lenge • Majolo Lenge • Len le Roux • Prince Mofokeng • Zwivhuya Mulaudzi • Lehan Muller • Samuel Muzaza • Henco Olivier • Philip Olivier • Jacques Pretorius • Neels Prinsloo • Nicolaas Steyn • Gert Strydom • Randall Swanepoel • Junior Swart • Driaan van der Linde • Viljoen van der Linde • Hugo van der Poll • Leon van Jaarsveld • Ryno Versfeld • Joe-Lythen Willemse |

Springs squad
Players

Shaun Botes • Dowayn Botha • Riaan Botha • Xena Botha • Martinus du Plessis • Janu du Toit • Fourie Francois • Nico Furbey • Andre Grobelaar • Robin Howell • Chris Janse van Rensburg • Gerhard Jordaan • Ruan Kotze • Yanga Gift Lokwe • Shaun McGeer • Marco Niemandt • DJ Oosthuizen • Garnette Parkin • Stanley Peacock • Francios Prinsloo • Andre Smit • Choefie Swart • Felix Toma • Wikus van den Berg • Zach van Loggerenberg • Nicolaas van Wyk • Divan van Zyl • Inus Vermaak • Cliffie Viljoen • Marchell Viljoen • Johan Zondagh

Swallows squad
Players

Onke Dubase • Billy Dutton • Samora Fihlani • Leza Gcilitshane • Lwando Mabenge • Samkelo Mabombo • Buhle Magazi • Soso Mantyoyi • Vuyisani Mavuso • Siphamandla Mbusi • Sokhana Mkhona • Mihlali Mpafi • Mbaba Mtsulwana • Simnikelo Nandipha • Mkhenia Ndzenene • Sipho Nofemele • Foxy Ntleki • Siya Pati • Anele Sibeko • Bayanda Siko • Bhulu Sineko • Lukhanyo Siyobi • Aphiwe Stemele • Sethu Tom • Lindokuhle Welemu • Soso Xakalashe • Aphiwe Xakalashe • Yanga Xakalashe • Siphelele Zono • Anele Zweni

Villagers Worcester squad
Players

Givan Adams • Gurshwin Africa • Jennewil April • Yrin Belelie • Timothy Beukes • Morné Boshoff • Courtney Cupido • Andries de Kock • Ashley Dreyden • André du Toit • Lincolin Eksteen • Damion Fuller • Austin Hendricks • Shandro Issel • Zeeke Jansen • Yazeed Johnson • Jasherie Karriem • Jodi Koul • Edwill Lundi Msenge • Cleve Malgas • Gurshwin Nikhole Wehr • Matthew Nortjé • Ian Thompson • Egan Uren • Sergeyodei Uys • Regarth Valla • Elton Valla • Neil van der Merwe • Sergeo van Rhyn • Calum Will Lawrence

Welkom squad
Players

Gavin Annandale • Slappies Arnolds • Robert Baadjies • Adoration Teboho Baji • Charles Barnard • Bradley Benade • JB Bezuidenhout • Christo Boshoff • Christo Buytendach • Anthony Carstens • Kudakwashe Chipunza • Quintin Davis • Hannes Fouché • Johannes Fourie • Rodger Hans • Johannes Hellyer • Llewelyn Hendricks • Boytjie Herbert • Christoffel Johannes Human • Michiel Human • Lucas Janse van Vuuren • Dillan Laurent • Carel Lewis • Luche Louw • Nathan Louw • Tertius Maarman • Vuyani Magadlela • Sakhile Mangali • Francois Maree • Revaldo Marima • Vincent Maruping • Franco Mateus • Lehlohonolo Matjele • Thato Mavundla • Richard Meiring • Stuga Moahloli • Leegan Moos • Sephetho Ndobela • Japie Nel • Le Andre Nell • Norman Nelson • Gedeon Nobali • Nkosi Nofuma • Albertus Stephanus Pretorius • Pieter Pretorius • Jason Rainbird-Webb • Mokhethi Ramatsa • Tristan Reynders • Jason Roux • Attie Scholtz • Mokhachane Sejanamane • Ramoelo Sesing • Khotso Setai • Paul Spies • Pieter Theunissen • Kerr Till • Tshidiso Tlale • Andy Towa • Maruis van der Walt • Dean van Loggerenberg • Rudi van Niekerk • Johannes van Rooyen • Ruan van Wyk • Ryno Venter • Riaan Conraad Vermeulen • Stanley Collin Vermeulen • Shaun Victor • Jaques Wheeler • Lwando Zita
