= 2019 Gold Cup =

2019 Gold Cup may refer to one of the following:

- 2019 CONCACAF Gold Cup, the men's continental championship for CONCACAF in association football
- 2019 Gold Cup (rugby union), an annual rugby union competition held between top non-university club teams of the South African Rugby Union's constituent provincial unions
- 2019 Gold Cup (India), the 4-team women's association football tournament organised by the All India Football Federation (AIFF)
