= Roy Godfrey =

South African rugby union player

- Full name: Roy Andrew Michael Godfrey
- Born: 11 August 1989 (age 37) East London, South Africa
- Height: 1.89 m (6 ft 2 1/2 in)
- Weight: 122 kg (19 st 3 lb; 269 lb)
- School: Selborne College, East London
- University: Nelson Mandela Metropolitan University

Rugby union career
- Position: Prop
- Current team: Jersey Reds
Youth career
- 2010: Sharks
Amateur team(s)
Years	Team	Apps	(Points)
2012–2014	NMMU Madibaz	23	(95)
2015–2017	Wimbledon	51	(105)
Senior career
Years	Team	Apps	(Points)
2013–2014	SWD Eagles	26	(30)
2014–2015	Perpignan	55	(30)
2017–	Jersey Reds	104	(105)
- Correct as of 28 September 2017

Roy Andrew Michael Godfrey (born 11 August 1989) is a South African rugby union player, currently playing in England with Championship side Jersey Reds. His regular position is loosehead prop.

== Career ==
=== Youth and Varsity Rugby ===
After playing high school rugby for Selborne College in his hometown of East London, Godfrey moved to Durban to join the Sharks Academy, representing the Sharks U21 side during the 2010 Under-21 Provincial Championship competition.

He returned to the Eastern Cape in 2012 and joined up with the Port Elizabeth-based Varsity Cup side, the NMMU Madibaz. The Madibaz finished fifth in 2012 Varsity Cup, with Godfrey playing in all seven their matches during the season, scoring two tries. He also played for them in 2013 and 2014. Not only did he once again start their matches during both these seasons, but he was also named captain of the side. He weighed in with four tries during those two seasons to help the Madibaz achieve their best results in the Varsity Cup, reaching the semi-final for the first time in 2013 and repeating the feat in 2014.

=== SWD Eagles ===
Godfrey's Varsity Cup exploits didn't go unnoticed at provincial level and he was signed by George-based outfit SWD Eagles for the 2013 Currie Cup First Division season. He made his debut by starting in the opening match of their season, away to Border Bulldogs in Godfrey's home town of East London. He scored a total of four tries during the season, the first coming against eventual champions the Pumasin Nelspruit and also getting a brace against the Falcons in George. He was a regular in the side throughout the campaign, starting in all their matches during the season and occasionally captaining the side in the absence of regular skipped Kabamba Floors.

=== Perpignan ===
After the conclusion of the 2014 Currie Cup First Division season, Godfrey signed for French Rugby Pro D2 side Perpignan as a short-term replacement for Sona Taumalolo.

=== Wimbledon ===
He joined English National League 3 London & SE side Wimbledon RFC prior the 2015–16 season.

=== Jersey Reds ===
On 27 April 2017, Godfrey signed for RFU Championship club Jersey Reds prior to the 2017-18 season.
