= Daniller =

Daniller is a surname. Notable people with the surname include:

- Hennie Daniller (born 1984), South African rugby union footballer
- Tertius Daniller (born 1989), South African rugby union player
