= Christo du Plessis =

South African rugby union player

- Full name: Christo John du Plessis
- Born: 2 June 1989 (age 37) George, South Africa
- Height: 1.88 m (6 ft 2 in)
- Weight: 100 kg (15 st 10 lb; 220 lb)
- School: George High School

Rugby union career
- Position: Flanker / Number eight
- Current team: Griffons
Youth career
- 2007: SWD Eagles
- 2008: Griffons
- 2009–2010: SWD Eagles
Amateur team(s)
Years	Team	Apps	(Points)
2010–2012	Blanco		
2013	Evergreens	2	(5)
Senior career
Years	Team	Apps	(Points)
2010–2017	SWD Eagles	85	(90)
- Correct as of 29 May 2018

Christo John du Plessis (born 2 June 1989 in George, South Africa) is a South African rugby union player who most recently played the SWD Eagles. His regular position is flanker or number eight.

== Career ==
=== Youth and amateur rugby ===
As a scholar playing rugby for George High School, Du Plessis was selected for the SWD Eagles side that played at the 2007 Under-18 Craven Week tournament.

In 2008, he moved to Virginia to join the Harmony Sports Academy. He also represented the Griffons U19 side in the 2008 Under-19 Provincial Championship, (which was the South African junior competition won by any Griffons side) and he was named their Forward of the Year.

He returned to George in 2009 where he was named in the SWD U21 side that played in the 2009 Under-21 Provincial Championship.

He also played some club rugby for Blanco between 2010 and 2012.

=== SWD Eagles ===
His introduction to first class rugby came during the 2010 Vodacom Cup competition when he was one of a number of club players that were included in the SWD Eagles squad for the competition. He was an unused reserve in their match against the Free State XV, but then played off the bench in their match against the Boland Cavaliers in Saldanha to make his debut. His second appearance came against the Border Bulldogs, which also saw Du Plessis score his first senior try in a 39–30 victory in Beaufort West.

He also made his Currie Cup debut later in 2010, during the 2010 Currie Cup First Division competition, playing off the bench in their match against the Border Bulldogs.

=== Blanco / Evergreens ===
However, he then fell out of the provincial set-up and reverted to playing amateur rugby for local club side Blanco in 2011 and 2012, also captaining the side as they qualified for the National Club Championships in 2012.

He made a single appearance for the SWD Eagles in the 2012 Vodacom Cup, playing the last 20 minutes of their match against Western Province.

He joined Pacaltsdorp-based club side Evergreens in 2013 and made two appearances for them in the 2013 SARU Community Cup competition, also scoring a try in their match against White River from Mpumalanga.

=== SWD Eagles (2013–) ===
His club form saw him earn a contract with the SWD Eagles and he made six appearances in the 2013 Vodacom Cup competition, scoring one try. He established himself as a first-choice player, starting ten matches for the Eagles during the 2013 Currie Cup First Division competition and playing off the bench twice. He also contributed three tries during the campaign as his side reached the semi-final stage of the competition before being eliminated 52–33 by eventual champions the Pumas.
