= Ashley Buys =

South African rugby union footballer

- Full name: Ashley Schutte Buys
- Born: 1 June 1979 (age 47) Blanco, George, South Africa
- Height: 1.72 m (5 ft 7 1/2 in)
- Weight: 120 kg (18 st 13 lb; 265 lb)
- School: George High School, George

Rugby union career
- Position: Prop
- Current team: SWD Eagles
Senior career
Years	Team	Apps	(Points)
2005–2008	SWD Eagles	58	(15)
2008–2012	Pumas	79	(10)
2013–present	SWD Eagles	23	(5)
- Correct as of 8 October 2015
International career
Years	Team	Apps	(Points)
2012	South African Barbarians	1	(0)
- Correct as of 25 March 2015

Ashley Schutte Buys (born 1 June 1979) is a South African rugby union footballer. He plays mostly as a tighthead prop. He represents the Pumas in the Currie Cup and Vodacom Cup having previously played for the SWD Eagles and South African Barbarians.
