= Cheswin Williams =

South African rugby union player

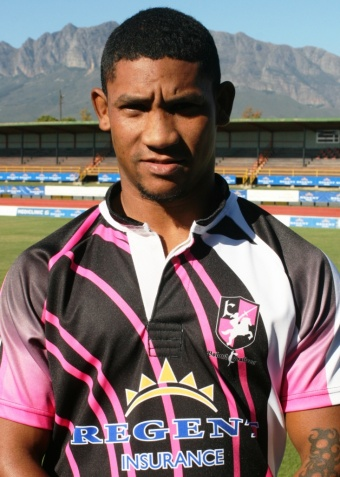
- Full name: Cheswin Williams
- Born: 22 September 1987 (age 39) Saldanha, South Africa
- Height: 1.74 m (5 ft 8 1/2 in)
- Weight: 81 kg (12 st 11 lb; 179 lb)

Rugby union career
- Position: Winger / Centre
- Current team: Boland Cavaliers
Amateur team(s)
Years	Team	Apps	(Points)
2006–present	Saldanha		
Senior career
Years	Team	Apps	(Points)
2012–present	Boland Cavaliers	29	(44)
- Correct as of 1 October 2014

Cheswin Williams (born 22 September 1987) is a South African professional rugby union player, currently playing with the Boland Cavaliers. He is a utility back than can play as an outside centre, winger or fullback.

== Career ==
=== Youth and amateur rugby ===
Williams started his career playing amateur rugby and represented the Boland Cavaliers at the Amateur Provincial Championships held in his hometown of Saldanha.

=== Boland Cavaliers ===
In 2012, Williams was one of the club players that were included in Boland Cavaliers training squads prior to the 2012 Vodacom Cup competition. He earned his inclusion in the squad for the competition and was included on the bench for their second game of the season against the Free State XV in Bredasdorp, but failed to make an appearance as the Boland Cavaliers held out for a narrow 32–30 win.

Just over a month later, Williams did make his first class debut when he came on in their match against the Border Bulldogs with eight minutes left in the match, where a dramatic finish saw Boland clinch a 45–40 victory after scoring a try in the final minutes of the match. Williams was promoted to the starting line-up for the Cavaliers' next match against the Eastern Province Kings.

Williams also featured in the Boland Cavaliers' Currie Cup campaign in the latter half of 2012. He made his Currie Cup debut as a second-half replacement against the Griffons in Worcester After two more substitute appearances, Williams made his first Currie Cup start in their match against the Leopards in Potchefstroom. Despite a personal points tally of 19 points (one try, four penalties and a conversion), Williams could not prevent the Cavaliers slipping to a 39–34 defeat. He made a total of eight appearances as the Cavaliers finished a disappointing sixth, despite being the defending champions.

Two more appearances followed in the 2013 Vodacom Cup competition and Williams also played ten times during the 2013 Currie Cup First Division competition, scoring three tries.
