= Spanner Pretorius =

South African rugby union player

- Full name: Johannes Hendrik Pretorius
- Born: 22 October 1987 (age 39) Klerksdorp, South Africa
- Height: 1.86 m (6 ft 1 in)
- Weight: 88 kg (13 st 12 lb; 194 lb)
- School: Klerksdorp High School / THS Middelburg
- University: North West University

Rugby union career
- Position: No 8 / Flanker
Youth career
- 2005–2006: Leopards
Amateur team(s)
Years	Team	Apps	(Points)
2011–2012	NWU Pukke	13	(15)
Senior career
Years	Team	Apps	(Points)
2011–2012	Leopards	28	(20)
2013	Border Bulldogs	20	(10)
2014	Falcons	5	(0)
- Correct as of 25 April 2014

Johannes Hendrik "Spanner" Pretorius (born 22 October 1987) is a South African rugby union player, who most recently played for Falcons. His regular position is loose-forward.

== Career ==
He played for Potchefstroom-based university side NWU Pukke in the 2011 and 2012 Varsity Cup competitions and also played for the provincial team the Leopards in those seasons. He made his first class debut for them in the 2011 Vodacom Cup game against Boland Cavaliers and quickly established himself as a regular starter.

He then joined the Border Bulldogs for the start of the 2013 Vodacom Cup competition.
