= Martin du Toit =

South African rugby union player (born 1989)

- Full name: Ozard Martin du Toit
- Born: 27 June 1989 (age 37) Welkom, South Africa
- Height: 1.83 m (6 ft 0 in)
- Weight: 85 kg (187 lb; 13 st 5 lb)
- School: Hottentots Holland High School, Somerset West

Rugby union career
- Position: Fly-half / Fullback / Centre
- Current team: El Salvador
Youth career
- 2008–2010: Western Province
Amateur team(s)
Years	Team	Apps	(Points)
2011	Hamiltons		
2012	NMMU Madibaz	7	(13)
Senior career
Years	Team	Apps	(Points)
2012–2017	SWD Eagles	76	(110)
2017–2019	Southern Kings	22	(19)
2019	Eastern Province Elephants	3	(10)
- Correct as of 1 July 2019

Ozard Martin du Toit (born 27 June 1989) is a South African professional rugby union player for Spanish División de Honor de Rugby side El Salvador. He is a utility back that can play as a fly-half, fullback or inside centre.

== Career ==
=== Youth, Amateur and Varsity rugby ===
Du Toit played high school rugby for Hottentots Holland High School, playing for the first XV since age 16 and making in excess of 50 appearances for his school.

Du Toit joined Western Province in 2008, where he played for the Western Province U19 side during the 2008 Under-19 Provincial Championship and for the Western Province U21 side during the 2009 and 2010 Under-19 Provincial Championships.

Du Toit spent 2011 playing club rugby for Hamiltons in the Western Province Super League before joining the NMMU Madibaz prior to the 2012 Varsity Cup. He started all seven of the Madibaz' matches, scoring one try and kicking four conversions.

=== SWD Eagles ===
Du Toit joined George-based side SWD Eagles for the 2012 Currie Cup First Division season. He made his first class debut in their match against the Border Bulldogs in East London. After one more appearance off the bench in their match against the Eastern Province Kings, he made his first start against the Pumas in Nelspruit. He made a fourth appearance against the Leopards, but suffered a broken hand that rules him out for the rest of the season.

In his first full season in 2013, he quickly established himself as a regular for the side. Seven appearances followed in the 2013 Vodacom Cup competition – which included Du Toit's first senior try in their final match of the competition against the Border Bulldogs – and he started eleven of his side's fifteen matches during the 2013 Currie Cup First Division, scoring three tries.

Du Toit was shifted to inside centre for the 2014 Vodacom Cup competition, contributing one try as he helped his side to the quarter-finals and was again named in the squad for their 2014 Currie Cup qualification campaign.
