= Doppies le Roux =

South African rugby union player

- Full name: Christo le Roux
- Born: 28 March 1985 (age 41) Bloemfontein, South Africa
- Height: 1.91 m (6 ft 3 in)
- Weight: 108 kg (17 st 0 lb; 238 lb)
- School: Hoër Landbouskool Oakdale, Riversdale
- University: North-West University

Rugby union career
- Position: Flanker / No 8
Senior career
Years	Team	Apps	(Points)
2008	SWD Eagles	15	(15)
2009–2014	Pumas	98	(75)
2012	Lions	1	(0)
2008–2014	Total	114	(90)
- Correct as of 5 May 2015

Christo 'Doppies' le Roux (born 28 March 1985, Bloemfontein) is a former South African rugby union footballer. His regular playing position is either flanker or eighthman. He represented the Lions in Super Rugby and the Pumas in the Currie Cup and Vodacom Cup.

He retired at the end of the 2014 season to focus on his engineering career.
