= Erik le Roux =

South African rugby union player

- Full name: Hendrik Frederik le Roux
- Born: 24 February 1988 (age 38) Bloemfontein, South Africa
- Height: 1.90 m (6 ft 3 in)
- Weight: 96 kg (15 st 2 lb; 212 lb)
- School: Grey College, Bloemfontein
- University: University of the Free State

Rugby union career
- Position: Flanker / Number Eight
Youth career
- 2005–2008: Free State Cheetahs
- 2009: Griquas
Amateur team(s)
Years	Team	Apps	(Points)
2010–2013	UFS Shimlas	14	(10)
Senior career
Years	Team	Apps	(Points)
2011	Free State Cheetahs	1	(0)
2011–2017	Griffons	51	(20)
- Correct as of 30 July 2015

Hendrik Frederik "Erik" le Roux (born 24 February 1988) is a South African professional rugby union player who last played for the Griffons. His regular position is flanker or eighth man.

== Career ==
=== Youth and Varsity Cup rugby ===
Le Roux played high school rugby at Grey College in Bloemfontein and represented his provincial side, Free State, at several youth tournaments. In 2005, he played for their Under-18 side at the Academy Week tournament and the following year at the Under-18 Craven Week tournament. He was a member of the Free State U19 side that played in the 2007 Under-19 Provincial Championship and of the Free State U21 side that played in the Under-21 Provincial Championship in 2008. In 2009, he moved to Kimberley-based side Griquas, where he played for their Under-21 side in the 2009 Under-21 Provincial Championship.

He also played Varsity Cup rugby for the Bloemfontein-based university side UFS Shimlas for four seasons from 2010 to 2013, making fourteen appearances and scoring two tries in 2013. He was also named their Varsity Cup Forward of the Year in 2013.

=== Free State Cheetahs ===
He made his first class debut in 2011. He was included in the Free State Cheetahs squad for the 2011 Vodacom Cup competition and started their match against the Griffons, helping them to a 38–24 victory.

=== Griffons ===
While that turned out to be his only match for the Free State Cheetahs' senior side, he did join their opponents in that match, Welkom-based Griffons prior to the 2011 Currie Cup First Division season. He made his first appearance in the Currie Cup competition in their match against the Falcons in Kempton Park and made a total of five appearances in the competition, all off the bench. Four more appearances – all as a replacement – followed in the 2012 Vodacom Cup, before playing in ten matches during the 2012 Currie Cup First Division competition. This season saw Le Roux starting his first match for the Griffons (in their 67–34 loss to the Pumas) and score his first senior try, in their match against the Border Bulldogs.

He was a key member of their 2014 Currie Cup First Division-winning side. He played off the bench in the final and helped the Griffons win the match 23–21 to win their first trophy for six years.
