= Tertius Daniller =

South African rugby union player

- Full name: Tertius Daniller
- Born: 4 August 1989 (age 37) Paarl, South Africa
- Height: 1.94 m (6 ft 4 1/2 in)
- Weight: 103 kg (16 st 3 lb; 227 lb)
- School: Paarl Gimnasium
- University: Stellenbosch University
- Notable relative: Hennie Daniller (brother)

Rugby union career
- Position: Flanker / No 8
Youth career
- 2008–2010: Western Province
Amateur team(s)
Years	Team	Apps	(Points)
2010–12, 2014	Maties	22	(15)
Senior career
Years	Team	Apps	(Points)
2010–2012	Western Province	17	(5)
2013	Free State XV	7	(10)
2013	→ Griffons	11	(10)
2016	Western Province	3	(0)
- Correct as of 23 July 2016

Tertius Daniller (born 4 August 1989 in Paarl) is a South African rugby union player, who most recently played with Western Province. His usually plays as a loose-forward.

== Career ==
=== Youth ===
He represented the Western Province U19 team in 2008 and the Western Province U21 team in 2009 and 2010.

=== Western Province ===
In 2010, he was included in the Western Province squad for the 2010 Vodacom Cup competition and made his first class debut for them against the SWD Eagles. That was his only appearance that season, but in the 2011 Vodacom Cup campaign, he made seven starts, which also led to his inclusion in the squad for the 2011 Currie Cup Premier Division. He made his debut against the Pumas, scored his first try two weeks later against the Leopards and made eight appearances overall.

=== Free State Cheetahs ===
He joined brother Hennie at the Free State Cheetahs for the start of 2013, making seven appearances in the 2013 Vodacom Cup competition.

=== Griffons ===
In 2013, he had a short spell on loan at the Griffons, playing in the 2013 Currie Cup First Division.

=== Varsity Cup ===
He also represented Maties in the 2010, 2011 and 2012 Varsity Cup competitions.

== Personal ==
Tertius Daniller is the younger brother of long-time Free State Cheetahs full-back Hennie Daniller.
