= Richard Lawson (rugby union, born 1986) =

South African rugby union player

- Full name: Richard James Lawson
- Born: 20 October 1986 (age 40) Johannesburg, South Africa
- Height: 1.85 m (6 ft 1 in)
- Weight: 94 kg (14 st 11 lb; 207 lb)
- School: Wynberg Boys' High School

Rugby union career
- Position: Fullback / Winger
- Current team: Hamiltons
Amateur team(s)
Years	Team	Apps	(Points)
2014–present	Hamiltons	9	(5)
Senior career
Years	Team	Apps	(Points)
2006–2008	Western Province	16	(15)
2009–2013	Griquas	47	(70)
2014	Boland Cavaliers	8	(10)
- Correct as of 7 April 2015
International career
Years	Team	Apps	(Points)
2008	Emerging Springboks	3	(0)
- Correct as of 5 May 2015

Richard James Lawson (born 20 October 1986) is a South African rugby union footballer, currently playing with Western Province Premier League side Hamiltons. His regular playing position is either full-back or wing. He represented Western Province and Griquas in the domestic Currie Cup and Vodacom Cup competitions.

After being released by Griquas at the end of 2013, Lawson played for club side Hamiltons, also representing them at the 2014 SARU Community Cup. He then returned to provincial rugby when he joined Wellington-based side Boland Cavaliers for the 2014 Currie Cup qualification tournament.
