= RW Kember =

South African rugby union player

- Full name: Reginald Walter Kember
- Born: 15 April 1983 (age 43) Adelaide, South Africa
- Height: 1.87 m (6 ft 1 1/2 in)
- Weight: 105 kg (231 lb; 16 st 7 lb)
- School: Daniel Pienaar HTS, Uitenhage

Rugby union career
- Position: Flanker / No 8
Senior career
Years	Team	Apps	(Points)
2006–2007	Mighty Elephants	30	(25)
2008	Lions	1	(0)
2008	Golden Lions	6	(0)
2008–2010	Leopards	51	(35)
2011–2014	Pumas	70	(80)
- Correct as of 18 April 2015
International career
Years	Team	Apps	(Points)
2009	Royal XV	1	(0)
- Correct as of 18 April 2015

Reginald Walter Kember (born 15 April 1983) is a South African rugby union footballer. He plays either as a flanker or eighthman. He most recently represented the Pumas in the Currie Cup and Vodacom Cup having previously played for the Mighty Elephants, Golden Lions and Leopards.
