= Shaun Raubenheimer =

South African rugby union player

- Born: 10 November 1983 (age 43) George, South Africa
- Height: 1.80 m (5 ft 11 in)
- Weight: 94 kg (14 st 11 lb; 207 lb)
- School: George High School
- University: SAPS College
- Notable relative: Davon Raubenheimer (cousin)

Rugby union career
- Position: Flanker
- Current team: SWD Eagles
Youth career
- 2001–2003: SWD Eagles
Senior career
Years	Team	Apps	(Points)
2008	Border Bulldogs	15	(10)
2009–2010	SWD Eagles	29	(60)
2011	Griffons	13	(10)
2012–2014	SWD Eagles	43	(70)
2019–present	SWD Eagles	6	(0)
2008–2014	Total	100	(150)
- Correct as of 1 July 2019
International career
Years	Team	Apps	(Points)
2012	South African Barbarians (South)	1	(0)
- Correct as of 14 May 2013

Shaun Raubenheimer (born 10 November 1983) is a former South African rugby union player for the SWD Eagles in the Currie Cup and the Rugby Challenge. He played as a loose-forward for the SWD Eagles, Border Bulldogs and Griffons between 2008 and 2014.

== Career ==
=== Youth ===
He represented his local side SWD Eagles at youth level until 2003. He then joined the SAPS College, which led to his inclusion in the South African Police team in 2006 and the South African Forces team in 2007.

=== Provincial career ===
In 2008, he joined the Border Bulldogs, making his debut in a 33–27 victory over the Blue Bulls in the 2008 Vodacom Cup. He quickly established himself as a first team regular, making fifteen appearances in the 2008 Vodacom and Currie Cup competitions.

He returned to the SWD Eagles in 2009, playing in the majority of their games in 2009 and 2010. A short spell at the Griffons followed in 2011 before he returned to the SWD Eagles once more in 2012.

Raubenheimer retired from professional rugby during the 2014 Currie Cup First Division due to other work commitments, having made 101 first class appearances and scoring 30 tries during his career.

=== Representative rugby ===
He was included in a South African Barbarians (South) team that faced England during the 2012 mid-year rugby test series.
