= Ossie Nortjé =

South African rugby union player

- Full name: Oshwill Nortjé
- Born: 3 December 1990 (age 35) George, South Africa
- Height: 1.67 m (5 ft 5 1/2 in)
- Weight: 72 kg (11 st 5 lb; 159 lb)
- School: George High School / Harmony Sports Academy, Virginia

Rugby union career
- Position: Scrum-half
- Current team: Griffons
Youth career
- 2007–2011: Griffons
Senior career
| Years | Team | Apps | (Points) |
| 2010–present | Griffons | 51 | (40) |
- Correct as of 23 July 2016

Oshwill Nortjé (born 3 December 1990) is a South African professional rugby union player, currently playing with the Griffons. His regular position is scrum-half.

== Career ==
=== Youth ===
Nortjé grew up in George, but then enrolled at the Harmony Sports Academy in Virginia, Free State. His performances for them led to his inclusion in the Griffons youth sides that played at the Under-18 Academy Week in 2007 and at the Under-18 Craven Week in 2008.

Also in 2008, Nortjé was included in the Griffons U19 side that played in the Under-19 Provincial Championship. He also played in the same competition in 2009 and in the Under-21 Provincial Championships in 2010 and 2011.

=== Griffons ===
During the 2010 Vodacom Cup, he was included in the first team squad for the first time and was named on the bench for their match against Griquas. However, he failed to make an appearance during that game and had to wait almost a year to get another opportunity to make his debut. He was named on the bench for their 2011 Vodacom Cup match against Argentinean invitational side, the Pampas XV in Potchefstroom. He promptly ran onto the field in the 67th minute of the match for his first class debut and soon celebrated scoring his first try, dotting down in the 74th minute. He made a further two appearances during the competition, but failed to make the breakthrough to their Currie Cup side.

Despite not playing in the 2012 Vodacom Cup competition, he was included in their squad for the 2012 Currie Cup First Division season and made his Currie Cup debut in their match against the Border Bulldogs, the first of four appearances off the bench in the competition, scoring a try against the Falcons.

After appearing in all seven of matches in the 2013 Vodacom Cup – scoring tries against the Limpopo Blue Bulls and the Falcons – he played a more prominent role during the 2013 Currie Cup First Division season, playing in twelve matches, with a highlight of his season being scoring two tries in their match against the Leopards as they beat the Potchefstroom side 34–28.

Nortjé was the first-choice scrum-half for the Griffons during the 2014 Vodacom Cup competition, starting six of their matches and was also included in their squad for the 2014 Currie Cup qualification tournament.
