= Kabamba Floors =

South African rugby union player

- Full name: Lucas Floors
- Born: 15 November 1980 (age 46) Oudtshoorn, South Africa
- Height: 1.75 m (5 ft 9 in)
- Weight: 88 kg (13 st 12 lb; 194 lb)
- School: Morestêr, Oudtshoorn

Rugby union career
- Position: Loose forward
Amateur team(s)
Years	Team	Apps	(Points)
- Crusaders, Port Elizabeth
Senior career
Years	Team	Apps	(Points)
2003–2004	SWD Eagles	33	(90)
2005–2012	Free State Cheetahs	95	(125)
2006–2011	Cheetahs	57	(50)
2013	SWD Eagles	17	(15)
- Correct as of 7 October 2013
International career
Years	Team	Apps	(Points)
2003–2006	South Africa Sevens		
2004	S.A. 'A'		
2006	South Africa	1	(0)
2007	Emerging Springboks	3	(10)
- Correct as of 3 May 2013

Lucas "Kabamba" Floors (born 15 November 1980 in Oudtshoorn, Western Cape) is a former South African rugby union footballer, who made in excess of 200 appearances during his playing career. He started and finished his career at the SWD Eagles, making 33 appearances for the George-based outfit between 2003 and 2004 and a further 17 appearances in 2013. He spent the bulk of his career in Bloemfontein, representing the Free State Cheetahs in the domestic Currie Cup and Vodacom Cup competitions and the Cheetahs in Super Rugby. His usual position is on the flank, although he occasionally plays at number eight, and was once selected on the wing. Floors made a single appearance for the national team, the Springboks, in 2006 and played for the national rugby sevens team between 2003 and 2006, also captaining them in 2006.

== Career ==
Floors' first season playing professional rugby turned out to be a memorable one; he scored 14 tries for the SWD Eagles in the 2003 Currie Cup season and 18 tries in all competitions. As of 2014, he is still the record holder of both these records for the SWD Eagles and it also placed him joint-third on the list of most tries scored to date in the Currie Cup in a single season.

During the same year he was selected for the South African sevens team, where his efforts earned him the South African Sevens Player of the Season award in 2004. The 16 tries that he scored during his sevens career placed him third on the list of most points scored by South African sevens players to date, and second on the list for most tries.

After a brief stint with the Stormers in 2004, Floors returned to the Eagles before departing for the Free State Cheetahs, where he has played for the next eight seasons.

In late November 2006 he was called up to the Springboks end-of-season touring squad to cover for injured players. He made his debut at flank on 25 November at Twickenham Stadium against England. The Springboks ended their seven-game losing streak against the English, winning the match 25–14.

Floors ended his 2006 season with the Players' Player of the Year title, and also received the Absa Currie Cup Player of the Year Award. He was named Man of the Match in the 2006 Currie Cup final which the Cheetahs won against the Blue Bulls.

In 2008 Floors was twice left out of the Cheetah's squad for disciplinary reasons, the second time for missing a team flight back to Bloemfontein. During the same year Cheetah's coach Naka Drotské selected Floors on the wing for the 13 September Currie Cup clash with the Sharks.

Floors' positional versatility as a loose forward was on display in the 2009 Currie Cup season when he starred as eighthman in the match against Boland.

Floors was contracted to play with the Cheetahs until the end of 2012. He then returned to the SWD Eagles where he captained the side in 2013.

He announced his retirement during the 2014 season, having made 207 first class appearances.
