= J. P. Mostert =

South African rugby union player

JP Mostert
- Full name: Juan-Pierre Francois Mostert
- Born: 22 January 1988 (age 38) Brits, South Africa
- Height: 1.93 m (6 ft 4 in)
- Weight: 106 kg (16 st 10 lb; 234 lb)
- School: Brits High
- University: Stellenbosch University
- Notable relative: Franco Mostert

Rugby union career
- Position: Flanker
Youth career
- 2005–2006: Leopards
- 2007–2009: Western Province
Amateur team(s)
Years	Team	Apps	(Points)
2008–2010	Maties		
2013	UP Tuks		
Senior career
Years	Team	Apps	(Points)
2011	Pumas	21	(5)
2012–2017	Falcons	83	(70)
2011–2017	Total	104	(75)
- Correct as of 2 June 2018
International career
Years	Team	Apps	(Points)
2006	S.A. Schools		
- Correct as of 25 April 2014

Juan-Pierre Francois Mostert (born 22 January 1988) is a former South African rugby union player that played first class rugby between 2011 and 2017. He played either as a flanker or eighthman and played for the Pumas in 2011, and for the Falcons from 2012 to 2017. He also played for Maties in the Varsity Cup.

Mostert was involved in a car accident in July 2017, resulting in a broken neck and paralysis.
