= Eric Zana =

South African rugby union player

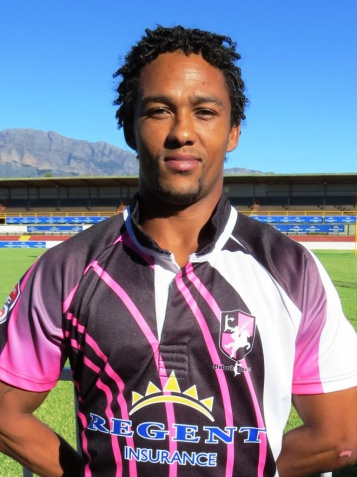
- Full name: Eric Sydney Zana
- Born: 25 March 1987 (age 39) George, South Africa
- Height: 1.74 m (5 ft 8 1/2 in)
- Weight: 70 kg (11 st 0 lb; 154 lb)
- School: Outeniqua High School, George

Rugby union career
- Position: Fly-half / Fullback
Youth career
- 2008: SWD Eagles
Amateur team(s)
Years	Team	Apps	(Points)
2007–2011	Progress		
2011–2012	Belhar		
Senior career
Years	Team	Apps	(Points)
2010–2011	SWD Eagles	23	(26)
2012–2015	Boland Cavaliers	59	(310)
2016–2018	Griquas	45	(34)
- Correct as of 27 October 2018

Eric Sydney Zana (born 25 March 1987) is a South African professional rugby union player who last played forGriquas in the Currie Cup and in the Rugby Challenge. His regular position is fly-half or fullback.

== Career ==
=== Youth and amateur rugby ===
Zana played predominantly club rugby for George-based Progress until 2009, although he was part of the SWD U21 squad for the 2008 Under-18 Provincial Championship.

=== SWD Eagles ===
In 2010, Zana was one of ten club players identified by SWD Eagles Johann Lerm and was included in their squad for the 2010 Vodacom Cup competition. He made his first class debut in the opening match of the SWD Eagles' season, a 13–22 home defeat to the Free State Cheetahs, with Zana contributing eight points with his boot through two penalties and a conversion. He started the first four of the SWD Eagles' fixtures in the competition, scoring 26 points.

Zana's contribution was deemed enough to also warrant his inclusion in the SWD Eagles' squad for the 2010 Currie Cup First Division season. Zana made his Currie Cup debut in the Eagles' first match of the season, a 33–12 victory over the Border Bulldogs. Zana played off the bench for the entire season, making eleven appearances in their twelve matches, as the Eagles finished top of the log during the pool stages. However, Zana was an unused substitute in the final against the Eastern Province Kings, where his side narrowly lost 16–12. He also played in both legs of the promotion/relegation play-offs, but could not prevent the SWD Eagles losing 65–54 on aggregate over two legs to remain in the First Division.

Zana once again returned for the 2011 Vodacom Cup season, making six appearances for the SWD Eagles.

=== Boland Cavaliers ===
In May 2011, Zana moved to the Western Cape where he joined club side Belhar. He was subsequently included in the Boland Cavaliers side for the 2012 Currie Cup First Division season. After playing off the bench twice, he then started in ten consecutive matches for the Cavaliers in the run-in of the season, scoring 22 points in the process, but couldn't help them qualify for the semi-finals. He was also included in the Boland Cavaliers sevens side that played at the 2012 7s Premier League in Zana's hometown, George.

Zana missed the 2013 Vodacom Cup competition through a shoulder injury, but returned for the 2013 Currie Cup First Division, where he contributed 65 points in thirteen appearances to finish as the Cavaliers' top points scorer in the competition and ninth overall.

Zana contributed a further 37 points during the 2014 Vodacom Cup competition and started the 2014 Currie Cup qualification tournament with a bang, as he scored 20 points (which included two tries) in their opening day defeat to the Griffons in Welkom.

=== Griquas ===
Zana joined Kimberley-based side Griquas for the 2016 season.
