= Ashwin Scott =

South African rugby union footballer

- Full name: Ashwin Robert Scott
- Born: 2 June 1985 (age 41) George, South Africa
- Height: 1.84 m (6 ft 1/2 in)
- Weight: 81 kg (12 st 11 lb; 179 lb)
- School: Pardene

Rugby union career
- Position: Winger
- Current team: SWD Eagles
Senior career
| Years | Team | Apps | (Points) |
| 2005–2008 | SWD Eagles | 39 | (58) |
| 2009–2014 | Pumas | 51 | (70) |
| 2013 | → Griffons | 2 | (0) |
| 2014–present | SWD Eagles | 4 | (5) |
- Correct as of 8 October 2015

Ashwin Robert Scott (born 2 June 1985) is a South African rugby union footballer. He plays mostly as a winger. He represents the SWD Eagles in the Currie Cup and Vodacom Cup having previously played for the Pumas.
