= Gerrit Smith (rugby union) =

South African rugby union player

- Full name: Gerhardus Phillipus Johannes Smith
- Born: 12 February 1988 (age 38) Pretoria, South Africa
- Height: 1.79 m (5 ft 10 1/2 in)
- Weight: 91 kg (14 st 5 lb; 201 lb)
- School: F.H. Odendaal, Pretoria
- University: University of Pretoria

Rugby union career
- Position: Utility back
- Current team: Pumas
Youth career
- 2007–2008: Falcons
Amateur team(s)
Years	Team	Apps	(Points)
2008–2010	UP Tuks	8	(38)
2012–2013	NMMU Madibaz	13	(43)
Senior career
Years	Team	Apps	(Points)
2009	Falcons	1	(0)
2013–2015	SWD Eagles	34	(88)
2017–2018	Pumas	19	(17)
- Correct as of 27 October 2018

Gerhardus Phillipus Johannes "Gerrit" Smith (born 12 February 1988 in Pretoria) is a South African rugby union player who last played for the Pumas in the Currie Cup and in the Rugby Challenge. He is a utility back and can play as a fly-half, centre, winger or full-back.

== Career ==
=== Youth and amateur ===
He represented the Falcons U19 team in the 2007 Under-19 Provincial Championship competition and for the Falcons U21 team in the 2008 and 2009 Under-21 Provincial Championship competitions.

He also played several seasons of Varsity Cup rugby – he played for UP Tuks in the 2008 and 2010 competitions and for NMMU Madibaz in the 2012 and 2013 competitions.

=== Falcons ===
He made his first class debut for the Falcons in the 14–95 defeat to the Pumas in the 2009 Currie Cup First Division. This turned out to be his one and only appearance for them.

=== SWD Eagles ===
After his spell playing for the NMMU Madibaz, he joined George-based side the SWD Eagles before the 2013 Currie Cup First Division season and made his debut for them in the first match of the season against the Border Bulldogs.
