= George High School =

High School in South Africa

Coordinates: 33°58′3″S 22°28′35″E

George High School Afrikaans: George Sekondêre Skool

Location
- George, Western Cape; South Africa

Information
- Established: 1947; 78 years ago
- Teaching staff: 38
- Enrollment: 1266 (2006)
- Language: Afrikaans

George High School, also known as George Secondary School (Afrikaans: George Sekondêre Skool) is an Afrikaans-medium school in George, a town in the Western Cape province of South Africa. It was established in 1947.

As of 2006 the school had some 1,266 students and 38 educators. In 2006 the Western Cape Education Department designated it one of 10 "Arts and Culture focus schools" to be set up over the following three years.
