= 2009 Vodacom Cup =

- Champions: Griquas
- Matches played: 49
- Tries scored: 246 (average 5 per match)
- Top point scorer: Francois Brummer 158 (Blue Bulls)
- Top try scorer: Cecil Afrika 7 (Griffons)

The 2009 Vodacom Cup was the 12th edition of this annual domestic cup competition. The Vodacom Cup is played between provincial rugby union teams in South Africa from the Currie Cup Premier and First Divisions.

== Competition ==
There were 14 teams participating in the 2009 Vodacom Cup competition. These teams were geographically divided into two sections – the Northern Section and the Southern Section, each with seven teams. Teams would play all the teams in their section once over the course of the season, either at home or away.

Teams received four points for a win and two points for a draw. Bonus points were awarded to teams that score four or more tries in a game, as well as to teams losing a match by seven points or less. Teams were ranked by points, then points difference (points scored less points conceded).

The top four teams in each section qualified for the play-offs. In the quarter-finals, the teams that finished first in each section had home advantage against the teams that finished fourth in the other section and the teams that finished second in each section had home advantage against the teams that finished third in the other section. The winners of these quarter finals then played each other in the semi-finals, with the higher placed team having home advantage. The two semi-final winners then met in the final.

== Teams ==
Location of teams in 2009 Vodacom Cup
Northern Section
Southern Section

=== Changes from 2008 ===
- The Natal Wildebeest were renamed Sharks XV.

=== Team Listing ===
The following teams took part in the 2009 Vodacom Cup competition:

Northern Section
Team	Stadium/s
Falcons	Bosman Stadium, Brakpan
Golden Lions	Ellis Park Stadium, Johannesburg
Griffons	North West Stadium, Welkom
Griquas	Griqua Park, Kimberley
Leopards	Profert Olën Park, Potchefstroom
Pumas	Puma Stadium, Witbank
Blue Bulls	Loftus Versfeld, Pretoria

Southern Section
Team	Stadium/s
Boland Cavaliers	Boland Stadium, Wellington
Border Bulldogs	Absa Stadium, East London
Mighty Elephants	EPRU Stadium, Port Elizabeth
Free State Cheetahs	Vodacom Park, Bloemfontein
Sharks XV	Absa Stadium, Durban
SWD Eagles	Outeniqua Park, George
Western Province	Newlands Stadium, Cape Town

== Tables ==
=== Northern Section ===
2009 Vodacom Cup Northern Section Table
	Team	Played	Won	Drawn	Lost	Points For	Points Against	Points Difference	Tries For	Tries Against	Try Bonus	Losing Bonus	Points
1	Blue Bulls	6	5	1	0	180	117	+63	15	10	2	0	24
2	Griquas	6	5	0	1	255	153	+102	31	13	3	0	23
3	Leopards	6	4	1	1	155	76	+79	14	5	2	1	21
4	Golden Lions	6	2	0	4	196	162	+34	24	17	3	3	14
5	Pumas	6	2	0	4	154	154	0	18	19	2	2	12
6	Griffons	6	1	0	5	149	286	-137	16	37	3	1	8
7	Falcons	6	1	0	5	111	252	-141	13	30	2	1	7
The top 4 teams qualified for the quarter-finals. Points breakdown: *4 points for a win *2 points for a draw *1 bonus point for a loss by seven points or less *1 bonus point for scoring four or more tries in a match

=== Southern Section ===
2009 Vodacom Cup Southern Section Table
	Team	Played	Won	Drawn	Lost	Points For	Points Against	Points Difference	Tries For	Tries Against	Try Bonus	Losing Bonus	Points
1	Sharks XV	6	6	0	0	213	80	+133	25	7	3	0	27
2	SWD Eagles	6	5	0	1	161	119	+42	16	11	2	1	23
3	Free State Cheetahs	6	4	0	2	209	147	+62	23	15	3	2	21
4	Western Province	6	3	0	3	175	122	+53	20	8	2	1	15
5	Border Bulldogs	6	2	0	4	115	157	-42	12	21	1	1	10
6	Boland Cavaliers	6	1	0	5	122	173	-51	14	18	2	2	8
7	Mighty Elephants	6	0	0	6	82	279	-197	9	39	0	0	0
The top 4 teams qualified for the quarter-finals. Points breakdown: *4 points for a win *2 points for a draw *1 bonus point for a loss by seven points or less *1 bonus point for scoring four or more tries in a match

== Fixtures and results ==
=== Week One ===
15:00 2009-02-27

Griquas	65 – 12	Valke
Tries: Danny Theron, Dewald Pretorius, Johannes Hermanus Pretorius, Lukhanyo Nontshinga (2), Richard Lawson (2), Rohan Kitshoff; Con: Naas Olivier (8); Pen: Naas Olivier (3)	Scoreboard	Tries: Con: Pen: Jeffrey Perkins (3); DG: Jeffrey Perkins

GWK Park, Kimberley
Referee: Ben Crouse

16:30 2009-02-27

Boland Kavaliers	18 – 43	Sharks XV
Tries: Godwann Dwayne Damon (2); Con: Lionel Cornelius; Pen: Lionel Cornelius (2)	Scoreboard	Tries: Chris Jordaan, Justin Downey, Lwazi Mvovo, Michael Kenworthy Rhodes; Con: Monty Dumond (4); Pen: Monty Dumond (5)

Boland Stadium, Wellington
Referee: Jaco Peyper

17:00 2009-02-27

Griffons	17 – 22	Vodacom Blue Bulls
Tries: Jan-Louis Coetzee; Con: Pen: Hugo Hendrik Kleynhans (4)	Scoreboard	Tries: Jaco Engels; Con: Francois Brummer; Pen: Francois Brummer (4); DG: Francois Brummer

North West Stadium, Welkom
Attendance: 1000
Referee: Mlungiseleli Mdashe

19:10 2009-02-27

Pumas	0 – 14	Platinum Leopards
Tries: Con: Pen:	Scoreboard	Tries: Russel Allan Jeacocks; Con: Pen: Clayton Durand (2); DG: Clayton Durand

Puma Stadium, Witbank
Attendance: 1000
Referee: Tiaan Jonker

15:00 2009-02-28

Vodacom FS Cheetahs	41 – 17	Border Bulldogs
Tries: Francois Uys, Jandré Blom, JW Jonker, Kabamba Floors, Mayibuye Ndwandwa; Con: Jandré Blom (5); Pen: Jandré Blom (2)	Scoreboard	Tries: Dumisani Meslane, Lubabalo Athini Mzwakali; Con: Reinhardt Gerber (2); Pen: Reinhardt Gerber

Vodacom Park, Bloemfontein
Attendance: 1800
Referee: Willie Roos

16:00 2009-02-28

SWD Eagles	43 – 20	Mighty Elephants
Tries: Bobby Joubert, Norman Nelson (2), Ricardo Croy (2), Victor Hugo Joubert; Con: Ricardo Croy (5); Pen: Ricardo Croy	Scoreboard	Tries: Daniel Vosloo, Trichardt van Tonder; Con: Rouaol Elrich Japhta (2); Pen: Rouaol Elrich Japhta (2)

Uniondale, George
Referee: Joey Salmans

Bye
Vodacom Western Province	Golden Lions

=== Week Two ===
19:10 2009-03-06

Platinum Leopards	18 – 20	Griquas
Tries: Con: Pen: Clayton Durand (6)	Scoreboard	Tries: Lukhanyo Nontshinga; Con: Pen: Naas Olivier (5)

Profert Olën Park, Potchefstroom
Referee: Gareth Lloyd-Jones

15:00 2009-03-07

Valke	34 – 37	Griffons
Tries: Jaco (Jakes) Pepler, Liebrecht Frederick Gericke, Pierre Foord, Theo Matthew Rhodes; Con: Jeffrey Perkins (4); Pen: Jeffrey Perkins (2)	Scoreboard	Tries: Cecil Afrika (3), Tertius Maarman; Con: Cecil Afrika, Petri Kunz (3); Pen: Hugo Hendrik Kleynhans (3)

Tembisa Rugby Club

15:00 2009-03-07

Vodacom Western Province	49 – 13	Mighty Elephants
Tries: Hayden Gareth Groepes (2), Johan Pietersen (2), Morgan Ram Newman (2), Pieter Myburgh; Con: Johan Pietersen (7); Pen:	Scoreboard	Tries: Ryan January; Con: Deon Booysen; Pen: Ryan Clifford Brown (2)

Newlands Stadium, Cape Town
Attendance: 50

15:00 2009-03-07

Golden Lions	34 – 47	Pumas
Tries: Minnie, Jannie Boshoff, Michael Killian, Shane Kirkwood, Thiliphatu Marole; Con: Divan Kotze (3); Pen: Divan Kotze	Scoreboard	Tries: Allistair Kettledas (2), Eduan Raymond Van Der Walt, Luan Velthuizen, Tiaan Marx; Con: Rudi Vogt (5); Pen: Rudi Vogt (3); DG: Rudi Vogt

Coca Cola Park, Johannesburg
Attendance: 2500

15:30 2009-03-07

Vodacom FS Cheetahs	19 – 23	Sharks XV
Tries: Alwyn Hollenbach, Ashley Francois Johnson; Con: Pen: Jandré Blom (3)	Scoreboard	Tries: Lwazi Mvovo; Con: Pen: Monty Dumond (6)

Petrusburg Sports Grounds, Petrusburg
Attendance: 7000

16:00 2009-03-07

SWD Eagles	19 – 16	Boland Kavaliers
Tries: Norman Nelson; Con: Ricardo Croy; Pen: Ricardo Croy (4)	Scoreboard	Tries: Neil Papier; Con: Lionel Cornelius; Pen: Lionel Cornelius (3)

Mossel Bay

Bye
Border Bulldogs	Vodacom Blue Bulls

=== Week Three ===
15:00 2009-03-13

Border Bulldogs	16 – 26	Vodacom Western Province
Tries: Lubabalo Athini Mzwakali; Con: Reinhardt Gerber; Pen: Reinhardt Gerber (3)	Scoreboard	Tries: Alshaun Gerswon Bock, Terrence Michael Jacobs (2); Con: Johan Pietersen; Pen: Johan Pietersen

ABSA Stadium, East London
Referee: Mtheleni Msileni

17:30 2009-03-13

Sharks XV	18 – 13	SWD Eagles
Tries: Andries Strauss, Lwazi Mvovo; Con: Monty Dumond; Pen: Monty Dumond (2)	Scoreboard	Tries: Danzel Manuel; Con: Ricardo Croy; Pen: Ricardo Croy; D.G: Ricardo Croy

The Absa Stadium, Durban
Attendance: 1000
Referee: Francois Veldsman

19:10 2009-03-13

Vodacom Blue Bulls	40 – 20	Griquas
Tries: Rocco Reginald Jansen, Tiger Mangweni (3); Con: Francois Brummer (4); Pen: Francois Brummer (3); D.G: Francois Brummer	Scoreboard	Tries: Albertus Marthinus Buckle, Cecil-John Kemp; Con: Naas Olivier (2); Pen: Naas Olivier (2)

Loftus Versfeld Stadium, Pretoria
Referee: Tiaan Jonker

15:30 2009-03-14

Valke	14 – 10	Pumas
Tries: Sergio de la Harpe, Thenis Johannes Brits; Con: Gido Horn (2); Pen:	Scoreboard	Tries: Eduan Raymond Van Der Walt; Con: Rudi Vogt; Pen: Rudi Vogt

Bosman Stadium, Brakpan
Attendance: 150
Referee: Dilbert November

15:30 2009-03-14

Platinum Leopards	11 – 10	Golden Lions
Tries: Colin Lloyd; Con: Pen: Clayton Durand (2)	Scoreboard	Tries: Penalty try Con: Jody Gavin Rose; Pen: Jody Gavin Rose

Profert Olën Park, Potchefstroom
Attendance: 1000
Referee: Mlungiseleli Mdashe

17:00 2009-03-14

Mighty Elephants	21 – 51	Vodacom FS Cheetahs
Tries: Alfonso Pietersen, Billy Mintoor, Ryan January; Con: Ryan Clifford Brown (3); Pen:	Scoreboard	Tries: Alwyn Hollenbach, Ashley Francois Johnson (2), JW Jonker (2), Pieter-Willem Van Vuuren, Ruan Jacobs; Con: Jandré Blom (5); Pen: Jandré Blom (2)

EPRFU Stadium, Port Elizabeth
Attendance: 500
Referee: Gareth Lloyd-Jones

Bye
Boland Kavaliers	Griffons

=== Week Four ===
19:00 2009-03-20

Griffons	18 – 42	Pumas
Tries: Virgil Russel, Werner Griesel; Con: Hugo Hendrik Kleynhans; Pen: Hugo Hendrik Kleynhans (2)	Scoreboard	Tries: Allistair Kettledas, Hyron Thyse, Jacques Coetzee, Jovan Botha, Petrus van Rooyen, Willem Jacobus Bouwer; Con: Rudi Vogt (3); Pen: Rudi Vogt (2)

North West Stadium, Welkom
Attendance: 500
Referee: Bongani Maloni

19:10 2009-03-20

Vodacom Blue Bulls	20 – 19	Golden Lions
Tries: John Mametsa; Con: Pen: Francois Brummer (5)	Scoreboard	Tries: Robert Albertus Kruger; Con: Jody Gavin Rose; Pen: Jody Gavin Rose (4)

Loftus Versfeld Stadium, Pretoria
Attendance: 2309
Referee: Joey Salmans

14:50 2009-03-21

Valke	10 – 42	Platinum Leopards
Tries: Gido Horn; Con: Jeffrey Perkins; Pen: Jeffrey Perkins	Scoreboard	Tries: Colin Lloyd, Deon van Rensburg, Riaan van der Westhuizen, Reginald Kember, Shuaib Samaai; Con: Clayton Durand (4); Pen: Clayton Durand (3)

Barnard Stadium, Kempton Park
Attendance: 200
Referee: Archie Sehlako

15:00 2009-03-21

Boland Kavaliers	29 – 30	Vodacom FS Cheetahs
Tries: Alfredo Hilton Barends, Donovan Smith (2), Godwann Dwayne Damon; Con: Lionel Cornelius (3); Pen: Lionel Cornelius	Scoreboard	Tries: Ivan Wayne Stevens, JW Jonker, Marnus Briedenhann; Con: Jandré Blom (3); Pen: Jandré Blom (3)

Piketberg
Referee: Jason Jaftha

15:30 2009-03-21

Sharks XV	23 – 16	Vodacom Western Province
Tries: Charl McLeod, Nicolaas Claasen; Con: Guy Cronje, Len Olivier; Pen: Len Olivier(3)	Scoreboard	Tries: Pieter Louw; Con: Coenraad George van Wyk; Pen: Johan Pietersen (2); D.G.: Johan Pietersen

Empangeni RC
Referee: Willie Roos

17:00 2009-03-21

Mighty Elephants	14 – 34	Border Bulldogs
Tries: Michael Vermaak, Trichardt van Tonder; Con: Marius Muller, Ryan Clifford Brown; Pen:	Scoreboard	Tries: Lubabalo Athini Mzwakali, Tyson Mulamba, Sokhana Mkona, Thembani Mkokeli, Ziniko Dumaphi; Con: Reinhardt Gerber (3); Pen: Reinhardt Gerber

Wolfson Stadium, Port Elizabeth
Referee: Jaco Peyper

Bye
SWD Eagles	Griquas

=== Week Five ===
15:00 2009-03-27

Griquas	26 – 21	Golden Lions
Tries: Albertus Marthinus Buckle, Naas Olivier; Con: Naas Olivier (2); Pen: Naas Olivier (4)	Scoreboard	Tries: Bernardo Carl Botha (2); Con: Jody Gavin Rose; Pen: Jody Gavin Rose (3)

GWK Park, Kimberley
Attendance: 1000
Referee: Mtheleni Msileni

17:00 2009-03-27

Griffons	14 – 48	Platinum Leopards
Tries: Cecil Afrika; Con: Pen: Hugo Hendrik Kleynhans (3)	Scoreboard	Tries: Christoffel Johannes Erasmus, Jovan Jacques Bowles, Michael Bondesio (2), Riaan Smit, Russel Allan Jeacocks; Con: Clayton Durand (6); Pen: Clayton Durand; D.G: Clayton Durand

North West Stadium, Welkom
Attendance: 500
Referee: Francois Veldsman

19:10 2009-03-27

Border Bulldogs	8 – 38	Sharks XV
Tries: Solly Tyibilika; Con: Pen: Reinhardt Gerber	Scoreboard	Tries: Carl Bezuidenhout, Chris Jordaan (2), Ian Adendorff, Lwazi Mvovo, Warren Roger Whiteley; Con: Len Olivier, Ross Cronje (3); Pen:

Border Rugby Stadium
Attendance: 750
Referee: Phillip Anthony Bosch

16:00 2009-03-28

Vodacom Western Province	46 – 7	Boland Kavaliers
Tries: Jody David Burch, Johan Pietersen, Liam Bax, Martin Dirk Muller, Paul Bosch, Wylie Human (2); Con: Johan Pietersen (4); Pen: Johan Pietersen	Scoreboard	Tries: Godwann Dwayne Damon; Con: Lionel Cornelius; Pen:

City Park Rugby Grounds, Athlone
Attendance: 1600
Referee: Tiaan Jonker

16:00 2009-03-28

Vodacom Blue Bulls	39 – 15	Valke
Tries: Rocco Reginald Jansen (2), Stephanus Christiaan Dippenaar; Con: Francois Brummer (3); Pen: Francois Brummer (6)	Scoreboard	Tries: Barne Viljoen, Nico Luus; Con: Jeffrey Perkins; Pen: Jeffrey Perkins

Hans Merensky Hoërskool, Limpopo
Attendance: unknown
Referee: Archie Sehlako

17:00 2009-03-28

Vodacom FS Cheetahs	33 – 38	SWD Eagles
Tries: Ashley Francois Johnson, JW Jonker, Pieter Myburgh, Tertius Carse; Con: Jandré Blom (2); Pen: Jandré Blom (3)	Scoreboard	Tries: Joe Breytenbach, Johannes Izak Adolf Saayman, Johannes Jacobus van Zyl, Norman Nelson; Con: Ricardo Croy (3); Pen: Ricardo Croy (4)

Shimla Park, Bloemfontein
Attendance: 9500
Referee: Mlungiseleli Mdashe

Bye
Pumas	Mighty Elephants

=== Week Six ===
15:00 2009-04-03

SWD Eagles	28 – 19	Vodacom Western Province
Tries: Norman Nelson; Con: Ricardo Croy; Pen: Johannes Jacobus van Zyl, Ricardo Croy (6)	Scoreboard	Tries: Jody David Burch; Con: Johan Pietersen; Pen: Johan Pietersen (4)

Outeniqua Park, George
Attendance: 800
Referee: Stuart Berry

19:10 2009-04-03

Platinum Leopards	22 – 22	Vodacom Blue Bulls
Tries: Nicky Kritzinger; Con: Clayton Durand; Pen: Clayton Durand (2), Riaan Smit (3)	Scoreboard	Tries: John Mametsa, Lubabalo Vincent Gwavu; Con: Pen: Ruan Jopie Boshoff (4)

Profert Olën Park, Potchefstroom
Attendance: 2000
Referee: Sandile Mayende

14:30 2009-04-04

Sharks XV	68 – 6	Mighty Elephants
Tries: Craig Burden, Guy Cronje, Justin Downey, Lwazi Mvovo (2), Michael Kenworthy Rhodes (3), Warren Roger Whiteley (2); Con: Len Olivier, Ross Cronje (7); Pen:	Scoreboard	Tries: Con: Pen: Ryan Clifford Brown (2)

The Absa Stadium, Durban
Attendance: 1000
Referee: Johannes (Joey) Salmans

15:00 2009-04-04

Golden Lions	53 – 32	Griffons
Tries: Earl Cassidy Lewis, Michael Killian (2), Robert Douglas Andrew, Walter Venter (2), Warren Perkins; Con: Earl Cassidy Lewis, Jody Gavin Rose (5); Pen: Jody Gavin Rose (2)	Scoreboard	Tries: Cecil Afrika, Hercules Andrew van der Walt, Nicky Steyn, Tertius Maarman; Con: Hugo Hendrik Kleynhans (3); Pen: Hugo Hendrik Kleynhans (3)

Alberton Rugby Club, Alberton
Attendance: 2000
Referee: Archie Sehlako

15:30 2009-04-04

Pumas	31 – 37	Griquas
Tries: Allistair Kettledas (2), Valentine van Wyk; Con: Rudi Vogt (2); Pen: Rudi Vogt (3); D.G: Rudi Vogt	Scoreboard	Tries: Egon Seconds (2), Hanno Coetzee, Rohan Kitshoff, Ryno Joseph Barnes; Con: Naas Olivier (3); Pen: Naas Olivier (2)

Puma Stadium, Witbank
Attendance: 500
Referee: Willie Roos

16:30 2009-04-04

Boland Kavaliers	18 – 27	Border Bulldogs
Tries: Anthonie Alfred Volmink, Jacquin Jansen; Con: Lionel Cornelius; Pen: Lionel Cornelius (2)	Scoreboard	Tries: Buhle Mxunyelwa, Ziniko Dumaphi; Con: Reinhardt Gerber; Pen: Reinhardt Gerber (5)

Boland Stadium, Wellington
Attendance: 350
Referee: Gareth Lloyd-Jones

Bye
Vodacom FS Cheetahs	Valke

=== Week Seven ===
19:05 2009-04-17

Border Bulldogs	13 – 20	SWD Eagles
Tries: Solly Tyibilika; Con: Reinhardt Gerber; Pen: Reinhardt Gerber (2)	Scoreboard	Tries: Baldwin Jonathan Henry Mc Bean, Mark Daniel Esterhuizen, Norman Nelson; Con: Ricardo Croy; Pen:

ABSA Stadium, East London
Attendance: 600
Referee: Phillip Anthony Bosch

19:10 2009-04-17

Vodacom Western Province	19 – 35	Vodacom FS Cheetahs
Tries: Dane Joseph Johnson; Con: Johan Pietersen; Pen: Johan Pietersen (4)	Scoreboard	Tries: Bevin Fortuin, Schalk van der Merwe; Con: Jandré Blom (2); Pen: Jandré Blom (6); D.G: Sias Ebersohn

Newlands Stadium, Cape Town
Attendance: 800
Referee: Pro Legoete

12:15 2009-04-18

Griquas	87 – 31	Griffons
Tries: Danny Theron, Egon Seconds, Hanno Coetzee, Lukhanyo Nontshinga, Naas Olivier (5), Richard Lawson (2), Rohan Kitshoff, Steph Roberts; Con: Naas Olivier (11); Pen:	Scoreboard	Tries: Cecil Afrika, Hugo Hendrik Kleynhans (2), Virgil Russel; Con: Hugo Hendrik Kleynhans (2), Petri Kunz (2); Pen: Hugo Hendrik Kleynhans

GWK Park, Kimberley
Attendance: ?
Referee: Francois Veldsman

15:00 2009-04-18

Golden Lions	59 – 26	Valke
Tries: Barry Goodes, Bernardo Carl Botha (2), David James Bulbring, Dusty Noble (2), Robert Douglas Andrew, Walter Venter, Warren Perkins; Con: Earl Cassidy Lewis, Jody Gavin Rose; Pen:	Scoreboard	Tries: Barne Viljoen, Darryl Pierce de la Harpe, Reg-Hack Muller, Theodore (Theo) Bekker; Con: Jeffrey Perkins (3); Pen:

Coca Cola Park, Johannesburg
Attendance: 1500
Referee: Jason Jaftha

16:00 2009-04-18

Pumas	24 – 37	Vodacom Blue Bulls
Tries: Ashley Buys, Duwayne Enslin Smart, Rudi Vogt; Con: Rudi Vogt (3); Pen: Rudi Vogt	Scoreboard	Tries: Francois Hougaard, Francois Hougaard, Rocco Reginald Jansen, Willem Jacob Serfontein; Con: Francois Brummer (4); Pen: Francois Brummer (3)

Puma Stadium, Witbank
Attendance: ?
Referee: Jaco Peyper

15:30 2009-04-18

Mighty Elephants	8 – 34	Boland Kavaliers
Tries: Trichardt van Tonder; Con: Pen: Ryan Clifford Brown	Scoreboard	Tries: Garth Kirsten Faro, Gida Rossouw de Swardt, Lauhan Jason Arendse, Pieter Johannes Brynard; Con: Lionel Cornelius (4); Pen: Lionel Cornelius (2)

EPRFU Stadium, Port Elizabeth
Attendance: ?
Referee: Leon (FS) van der Merwe

Bye
Platinum Leopards	Sharks XV

=== Quarter finals ===
17:00 24 April 2009

Sharks XV	20 – 7	Golden Lions
Tries: Chris Jordaan, Craig Burden; Con: Monty Dumond (2); Pen: Monty Dumond, Ross Cronje	Scoreboard	Tries: Walter Venter; Con: Jody Gavin Rose; Pen:

ABSA Stadium, Durban
Attendance: 700
Referee: Jason Jaftha

14:00 25 April 2009

Vodacom Blue Bulls	36 – 16	Vodacom Western Province
Tries: Jacques Burger, Marius Delport, Mthunzi Karl Mabeta; Con: Francois Brummer (3); Pen: Francois Brummer (5)	Scoreboard	Tries: Tonderai Chavhanga; Con: Johan Pietersen; Pen: Johan Pietersen (3)

Loftus Versfeld, Pretoria
Attendance: ?
Referee: Stuart Berry

15:00 25 April 2009

Griquas	30 – 25	Vodacom FS Cheetahs
Tries: Bjorn Basson, Egon Seconds; Con: Riaan Viljoen (3); Pen: Riaan Viljoen (2); D.G: Riaan Viljoen	Scoreboard	Tries: Francois Uys, JW Jonker, Schalk van der Merwe; Con: Sias Ebersohn (2); Pen: Jandré Blom, Sias Ebersohn

GWK Park, Kimberley
Attendance: 500
Referee: Johannes (Joey) Salmans

17:00 25 April 2009

SWD Eagles	16 – 32	Platinum Leopards
Tries: Ashton Constant, Johannes Jacobus van Zyl; Con: Pen: Ricardo Croy (2)	Scoreboard	Tries: Michael Bondesio, Nicky Kritzinger, Russel Allan Jeacocks (2); Con: Riaan Smit (3); Pen: Riaan Smit; D.G: Willem Johannes (Wilhelm) Koch

Outeniqua Park, George
Attendance: ?
Referee: Gareth Lloyd-Jones

=== Semi finals ===
12:00 2 May 2009

Sharks XV	25 – 36	Griquas
Tries: Alex Koch; Con: Monty Dumond; Pen: Monty Dumond (6)	Scoreboard	Tries: Lukhanyo Nontshinga (2), Riaan Viljoen (2); Con: Riaan Viljoen (2); Pen: Johannes Hermanus Pretorius, Riaan Viljoen (2); D.G: Johannes Hermanus Pretorius

Absa Park Stadium, Durban
Referee: Pro Legoete

14:00 2 May 2009

Vodacom Blue Bulls	45 – 34	Platinum Leopards
Tries: John Mametsa, Ockert Cornelius Kruger, Rocco Reginald Jansen, Wayne Julies; Con: Francois Brummer (2); Pen: Francois Brummer (5); D.G: Francois Brummer (2)	Scoreboard	Tries: Nicky Kritzinger, Riaan Swanepoel (2), Rudi Mathee; Con: Riaan Smit (4); Pen: Riaan Smit (2)

Loftus Versfeld, Pretoria
Referee: Jaco Peyper

=== Final ===
14:00 9 May 2009

Vodacom Blue Bulls	19 – 28	Griquas
Tries: Francois Brummer; Con: Francois Brummer; Pen: Francois Brummer (3); D.G: Francois Brummer	Scoreboard	Tries: Riaan Viljoen; Con: Riaan Viljoen; Pen: Riaan Viljoen (7)

Loftus Stadium, Pretoria
Referee: Phillip Anthony Bosch

== Winners ==
2009
Vodacom Cup
CHAMPIONS
Griquas
4th title

== Stats ==
Top 5 Point Scorers
Player	Team	Tries	Cons	Pens	Drops	Total
Francois Brummer	Vodacom Blue Bulls	1	18	36	5	158
Naas Olivier	Griquas	5	26	16	0	125
Johan Pietersen	Vodacom Western Province	3	15	17	1	99
Jandré Blom	Vodacom FS Cheetahs	1	17	20	0	99
Ricardo Croy	SWD Eagles	2	12	19	1	94

Top Point Scorers

Top 5 Try Scorers
Player	Team	Tries
Cecil Afrika	Griffons	7
JW Jonker	Vodacom FS Cheetahs	6
Lukhanyo Nontshinga	Griquas	6
Allistair Kettledas	Pumas	6
Lwazi Mvovo	Sharks XV	6

Top Try Scorers

Team Disciplinary Record
Team	Sent off (straight red)	Booked	Total
Pumas	0	7	7
Vodacom Blue Bulls	0	5	5
SWD Eagles	0	4	4
Golden Lions	0	4	4
Valke	0	4	4
Griquas	0	3	3
Griffons	0	3	3
Boland Kavaliers	0	3	3
Border Bulldogs	1	1	2
Vodacom FS Cheetahs	0	2	2
Mighty Elephants	0	2	2
Platinum Leopards	0	2	2
Sharks XV	0	2	2
Vodacom Western Province	0	2	2
TOTAL	1	44	45

- 44 yellow cards were shown to 43 different players.
