= 2010 Currie Cup First Division =

Domestic rugby union competition

- Champions: Eastern Province Kings
- Runners-up: SWD Eagles
- Matches played: 33
- Tries scored: 253 (average 7.7 per match)
- Top point scorer: Ambrose Barends
- Top try scorer: Coert Cronjé / Norman Nelson

The 2010 Currie Cup First Division was contested from 16 July through to 15 October 2010. The tournament (also known as the Absa Currie Cup First Division for sponsorship reasons) is the second tier of South Africa's premier domestic rugby union competition, featuring teams representing either entire provinces or substantial regions within provinces.

== Competition ==
=== Regular season and title playoffs ===
There were 6 participating teams in the 2010 Currie Cup First Division. These teams played each other twice over the course of the season, once at home and once away.

Teams received four points for a win and two points for a draw. Bonus points were awarded to teams that score 4 or more tries in a game, as well as to teams losing a match by 7 points or less. Teams were ranked by points, then points difference (points scored less points conceded).

The top 4 teams qualified for the title play-offs. In the semifinals, the team that finished first had home advantage against the team that finished fourth, while the team that finished second had home advantage against the team that finished third. The winners of these semi-finals played each other in the final, at the home venue of the higher-placed team.

=== Promotion playoffs ===
The top 2 teams on the log also qualified for the promotion/relegation play-offs. The first placed team played off against the team placed eighth in the 2010 Currie Cup Premier Division and the second placed team played off against the team placed seventh in the Premier Division. The winners of these two ties (determined via two team tables, with all Currie Cup ranking regulations in effect) qualified for the 2011 Currie Cup Premier Division, while the losing teams qualified for the 2011 Currie Cup First Division.

== Teams ==
Location of teams in 2010 Currie Cup First Division

=== Changes from 2009 ===
- The Pumas left the league, having won promotion to the 2010 Currie Cup Premier Division.
- The Boland Cavaliers joined the league, having been relegated from the 2009 Currie Cup Premier Division.
- The Mighty Elephants changed their name to Eastern Province Kings just before the Regular Season started.

=== Team Listing ===
Team	Stadium	Capacity
Boland Cavaliers	Boland Stadium, Wellington	3,500
Border Bulldogs	Buffalo City Stadium, East London	16,000
Eastern Province Kings	Nelson Mandela Bay Stadium, Port Elizabeth	48,459
Griffons	North West Stadium, Welkom	17,000
SWD Eagles	Outeniqua Park, George	10,000
Falcons	Barnard Stadium, Kempton Park	7,000

== Table ==
2010 Currie Cup First Division Table
Pos	Team	Pld	W	D	L	PF	PA	PD	TF	TA	TB	LB	Pts	Qualification
1	SWD Eagles (Q)	10	8	0	2	342	243	+99	41	29	5	2	39	Title play-off semi-final games and Promotion/Relegation Games
2	Eastern Province Kings (Q)	10	8	0	2	306	204	+102	37	20	5	0	37	Title play-off semi-final games and Promotion/Relegation Games
3	Boland Cavaliers	10	5	0	5	359	305	+54	48	36	7	2	29	Title play-off semi-final games
4	Griffons	10	5	0	5	350	250	+100	46	32	5	3	28	Title play-off semi-final games
5	Border Bulldogs	10	3	0	7	264	396	−132	29	52	3	1	16	
6	Falcons	10	1	0	9	276	499	−223	39	71	6	1	11	

Rules for classification:
- 4 points for a win
- 2 points for a draw
- 1 bonus point for a loss by seven points or less
- 1 bonus point for scoring four or more tries in a match
(Q) Qualified for the phase indicated

== Fixtures and results ==
- Fixtures are subject to change.
- All times are South African (GMT+2).

=== Compulsory Friendlies ===
18:00 2010-06-25	Falcons	3 - 80	Sharks XV	John Vorster Stadium, Nigel
	Pen: J. Naudé 58' (1/2); Cards: T. Ngidi (yellow card) 18' to 30'	Scoreboard	Tries: J. Botes 15'c, 19'm, 72'c M. Rhodes 24'c T. Mtawarira 29'c M. Richards 35'c D. Jenner 38'c K. Daniel 40'c, 76'c S. Terblanche 43'c K. Cooper 66'm C. McLeod 80'c Con: R. Kockott (6/7); M. Dumond (2/3); J. Botes (1/1); K. Daniel (1/1)	Attendance: 1,500; Referee: Pro Legoete

17:00 2010-07-02	SWD Eagles	12 - 50	Griquas	Recreation Ground, Oudtshoorn
	Tries: B. McBean 24'm M. Potts 76'c Con: J. Blom (1/1); Cards: G. Mtyanda (yellow card) 26' to 37'; W. Bennett (yellow card) 36' to 46'	Scoreboard	Tries: W. Wilkins 5'c R. Viljoen 26'm W. Malgas 36'm B. Basson 44'c, 52'm M. Rosslee 60'c R. Barnes 62'c F. Spies 67'c Con: N. Olivier (5/8)	Referee: Stuart Berry

18:00 2010-07-02	Griffons	5 - 29	Western Province	North West Stadium, Welkom
	Tries: E. Schultz 58'm	Scoreboard	Tries: P. Louw 16'c, 36'c, 69'm A. Fondse 21'c Con: W. De Waal (3/3); Pen: W. De Waal 40' (1/2)	Attendance: 3,500; Referee: Lourens van der Merwe

16:00 2010-07-03	Boland Cavaliers	29 - 45	Golden Lions	Boland Stadium, Wellington
	Tries: C. Hendricks 9'm J. Pieterse 53'm, 80'c B. April 68'c L. Cornelius 78'm Con: J. Jansen (2/4)	Scoreboard	Tries: M. Killian 6'c, 59'm T. Chavhanga 14'c D. Minnie 19'c J.C. Janse van Rensburg 22'c J. Taute 56'c F. Van der Merwe 64'm Con: H. Kruger (4/4); E. Jantjies (1/3); Cards: G. Earle (yellow card) 77'	Referee: Joey Salmans

16:00 2010-07-03	Mighty Elephants	11 - 24	Blue Bulls	EPRU Stadium, Port Elizabeth
	Tries: T. Mangweni 47'm Pen: D. Stevens 2', 68' (2/2); Cards: J. Potgieter (yellow card) 26' to 36'	Scoreboard	Tries: G. Botha 29'm H. Groepes 58'c, 71'c J. Kruger 80'm Con: J.L. Potgieter (2/3)	Referee: Jason Jaftha

19:00 2010-07-03	Border Bulldogs	7 - 45	Free State Cheetahs	Buffalo City Stadium, East London
	Tries: D. Meslane 10'c Con: A. Gqobo (1/1)	Scoreboard	Tries: J. Nokwe 3'm F. Uys 17'c T. Carse 29'c C. Oosthuizen 43'c, 56'c K. Floors 66'c, 68'm Con: L. Strydom (4/5); S. Ebersohn (1/1)	Referee: Sandile Mayende

=== Regular season ===
==== Round one ====
16 July 2010
15:00

Border Bulldogs	28–42	Eastern Province Kings
Tries: T. Mkokeli 40'c Y. Mkaza 68'm R. Kennedy 80'c Con: A. Gqobo (1/1); L. Basson (1/2); Pen: A. Gqobo 43' (1/2); L. Basson 59', 61' (2/2); Cards: B. Mntunjani (yellow card) 64'; N. Tonga (yellow card) 70'	Scoreboard; Report	Tries: J. Potgieter 13'c W. Stevens 31'c T. Mangweni 53'm D. Stevens 71'c N. Nelson 76'c Con: J. Peach (2/3); D. Stevens (2/2); Pen: J. Peach 20', 26' (2/4); D. Stevens 65' (1/1); Cards: J. Potgieter (yellow card) 61'

Buffalo City Stadium, East London
Attendance: 1,500
Referee: Sandile Mayende

17 July 2010
16:30

Griffons	43–8	Falcons
Tries: J.W. Jonker 6'c D. Van Heerden 18'c, 42'm H. Van der Nest 60'c, 78'c R. Lamprecht 72'c Con: J. Myburgh (5/6); Pen: J. Myburgh 11' (1/3)	Scoreboard; Report	Tries: E. Gauche 47'm Pen: C. Botha 13' (1/1); Cards: S. Van der Walt (yellow card) 51'

North West Stadium, Welkom
Attendance: 500
Referee: Jonathan Kaplan

Byes
Boland Cavaliers	SWD Eagles

==== Round two ====
23 July 2010
17:00

Eastern Province Kings	26–25	Griffons
Tries: N. Nelson 38'm S. Mxoli 45'c J. Fourie 81'm Con: D. Stevens (1/1); Pen: J. Peach 5', 29', 56' (3/4)	Scoreboard	Tries: H. Van der Nest 1'm R. Mathee 13'c J. Meyer 53'c Con: J. Myburgh (2/3); Pen: J. Myburgh 7', 17' (2/3)

Nelson Mandela Bay Stadium, Port Elizabeth
Referee: Mark Lawrence

23 July 2010
19:00

SWD Eagles	33–12	Border Bulldogs
Tries: A. Barends 22'c S. Raubenheimer 66'm S. Zweni 77'm M. Potts 78'c Con: A. Barends (1/2); J. Blom (1/2); Pen: A. Barends 7', 32', 64' (3/4)	Scoreboard; Report	Pen: R. Gerber 34', 46', 58', 66' (4/4); Cards: S. Tyibilika (yellow card) 6'; D. Meslane (yellow card) 21'

Outeniqua Park, George
Attendance: 500
Referee: Craig Joubert

24 July 2010
15:00

Falcons	10–53	Boland Cavaliers
Tries: C. Cronjé 45'c Con: J. George (1/1); Pen: C. Botha 3' (1/3)	Scoreboard; Report	Tries: J. Jansen 5'm, 25'm W. Le Roux 9'm, 39'c, 79'c D. Swartbooi 51'c J. Plaatjies 54'm H. Louw 63'm B. Conradie 74'c Con: J. Jansen (2/7); C. Micklewood (2/2)

Barnard Stadium, Kempton Park
Attendance: 500
Referee: Joey Salmans

==== Round three ====
31 July 2010
16:00

Boland Cavaliers	22–33	Eastern Province Kings
Tries: J. Plaatjies 17'c P.J. Vermeulen 38'm C. Hendricks 47'c Con: J. Jansen (2/3); DG: W. Le Roux 6' (1/1)	Scoreboard; Report	Tries: W. Stevens 33'm P. Ferreira 35'm D. Nell 43'c R. Vermeulen 61'c Con: J. Peach (1/3); M. Stick (1/1); Pen: J. Peach 4', 16', 20' (3/3); Cards: D.W. Barry (yellow card) 71'

Boland Stadium, Wellington
Attendance: 1,000
Referee: Jaco Peyper

31 July 2010
16:30

Griffons	14–18	SWD Eagles
Tries: W. Britz 73'c W. Griesel 77'c Con: R. Smit (2/2)	Scoreboard; Report	Tries: J. Breytenbach 52'm S. Zweni 61'c Con: A. Barends (1/2); Pen: A. Barends 10', 54' (2/2)

North West Stadium, Welkom
Attendance: 1,000
Referee: Sandile Mayende

Byes
Border Bulldogs	Falcons

==== Round four ====
6 August 2010
19:00

SWD Eagles	45–36	Boland Cavaliers
Tries: G. Mtyanda 10'c B. Joubert 20'c J. Breytenbach 37'c W. Harmse 71'm S. Raubenheimer 79'c Con: A. Barends (3/3); J. Blom (1/2); Pen: A. Barends 34', 44', 61' (3/4); J. Blom 73' (1/2); Cards: G. Mtyanda (yellow card) 67'	Scoreboard; Report	Tries: D. Swartbooi 14'm J. Plaatjies 23'c F. September 26'c P.J. Vermeulen 39'c B. Immelman 69'c Con: J. Jansen (4/5); Pen: J. Jansen 57' (1/2); Cards: D. Swartbooi (yellow card) 68'

Outeniqua Park, George
Attendance: 2,500
Referee: Marius Jonker

6 August 2010
19:05

Border Bulldogs	22–20	Griffons
Tries: S. Ganto 41'c N. Tonga 49'm T. Mkokeli 77'c Con: J. Taljard (2/3); Pen: J. Taljard 65' (1/2)	Scoreboard; Report	Tries: E. Fredericks 8'c, 44'c Con: R. Smit (2/2); Pen: R. Smit 26', 37' (2/3); Cards: S. Oosthuizen (yellow card) 39'

Buffalo City Stadium, East London
Referee: Pro Legoete

7 August 2010
17:00

Eastern Province Kings	38–3	Falcons
Tries: D.W. Barry 1'c P. Ferreira 4'm, 50'c D. Nell 33'm G. Odendaal 37'm Con: M. Stick (2/5); Pen: M. Stick 8', 44' (2/2); DG: J. Van Schalkwyk 80' (1/1)	Scoreboard; Report	Pen: C. Botha 18' (1/1); Cards: W. Perkins (yellow card) 74'

Nelson Mandela Bay Stadium, Port Elizabeth
Attendance: 5,000
Referee: Jaco Peyper

==== Round 5 ====
13 August 2010
16:00

Boland Cavaliers	46–50	Border Bulldogs
Tries: F. September 3'c C. Hendricks 10'm, 27'c, 44'c J. Plaatjies 34'c L. Cornelius 73'c Con: J. Jansen (4/5); L. Cornelius (1/1); Pen: L. Cornelius 50', 60' (2/2); Cards: B. Immelman (yellow card) 52'	Scoreboard; Report	Tries: R. Doneghan 14'c B. Venter 37'm B. Mntunjani 54'c L. Basson 66'c L. Mhlobiso 71'm M. Taljard 77'c Con: J. Taljard (2/3); L. Basson (2/3); Pen: J. Taljard 7' (1/2); L. Basson 19', 31', 62' (3/3)

Boland Stadium, Wellington
Referee: Jason Jaftha

14 August 2010
15:00

Falcons	47–55	SWD Eagles
Tries: C. Cronje 2'm, 12'm, 57'c C. Botha 20'c C. Van Lill 46'm F. Booysen 66'm S. Van der Walt 78'c Con: M. Thomsen (1/1); G. Horn (2/4); Pen: G. Horn 40', 43' (2/2)	Scoreboard; Report	Tries: J. Engelbrecht 8'm S. Raubenheimer 15'm D. Manuel 25'c G. Mtyanda 28'c A. Van der Westhuizen 33'c B. Fortuin 55'c J. Blom 72'c B. Joubert 76'c Con: A. Barends (3/5); J. Blom (3/3); Pen: A. Barends 4' (1/1); Cards: J. Engelbrecht (yellow card) 78'

Barnard Stadium, Kempton Park
Attendance: 1,500
Referee: Craig Joubert

Byes
Eastern Province Kings	Griffons

==== Round 6 ====
20 August 2010
16:30

Griffons	52–13	Boland Cavaliers
Tries: W. Britz 8'c J.W. Jonker 38'c, 52'm H. Van der Nest 42'c R. Mathee 60'm M. Briedenhann 63'c N. Steyn 79'm Con: J. Myburgh (4/7); Pen: J. Myburgh 22', 30', 36' (3/4)	Scoreboard; Report	Tries: C. Lewis 45'm C. Hendricks 73'm Pen: W. Le Roux 26' (1/1)

North West Stadium, Welkom
Attendance: 100
Referee: Sandile Mayende

20 August 2010
19:00

SWD Eagles	17–19	Eastern Province Kings
Tries: B. McBean 82'm Pen: A. Barends 7', 16', 38', 71' (4/7)	Scoreboard; Report	Tries: N. Nelson 67'c Con: D. Stevens (1/1); Pen: D. Stevens 5', 9', 29', 42' (4/6)

Outeniqua Park, George
Attendance: 3,500
Referee: Jaco Peyper

20 August 2010
19:05

Border Bulldogs	37–38	Falcons
Tries: R. Kennedy 25'c N. Tonga 29'm L. Basson 47'm, 79'c J. Taljard 63'c Con: L. Basson (3/5); Pen: L. Basson 4', 60' (2/4)	Scoreboard; Report	Tries: R. Muller 13'c, 34'c W. Perkins 15'c B. Fortuin 32'c C. Van Lill 40'm C. Cronjé 67'm Con: G. Horn (3/3); J. Naudé (1/3)

Buffalo City Stadium, East London
Attendance: 500
Referee: Jonathan Kaplan

==== Round 7 ====
27 August 2010
19:00

Eastern Province Kings	49–6	Border Bulldogs
Tries: P. Perez 3'c J. Potgieter 30'c, 34'c G. Odendaal 46'm M. Nqoro 59'c T. Mangweni 76'c Con: J. Van Schalkwyk (4/5); M. Stick (1/1); Pen: J. Van Schalkwyk 20', 25', 54' (3/3); Cards: J. Potgieter (yellow card) 68'	Scoreboard; Report	Pen: L. Basson 6', 17' (2/3); Cards: S. Fihlani (yellow card) 27'; B. Mntunjani (yellow card) 63'

Nelson Mandela Bay Stadium, Port Elizabeth
Attendance: 5,000
Referee: Marius Jonker

28 August 2010
15:00

Falcons	30–69	Griffons
Tries: J. Snyman 45'm K. Hendricks 48'c, 68'm S. Van der Walt 61'c Con: M. Thomsen (2/3); Pen: M. Thomsen 6', 11' (2/3); Cards: A. Klonaridis (yellow card) 28'; W. Perkins (yellow card) 42'	Scoreboard; Report	Tries: E. Fredericks 8'c H. Van der Nest 20'c K. Stevens 31'c T. Molefe 35'c J.W. Jonker 38'c, 56'c, 71'c W. Griesel 41'c, 79'm E. Schultz 77'm Con: J. Myburgh (6/6); B. Goodes (2/4); Pen: J. Myburgh 1' (1/2); Cards: J. Wessels (yellow card) 42'

Barnard Stadium, Kempton Park
Attendance: 1,000
Referee: Joey Salmans

Byes
Boland Cavaliers	SWD Eagles

==== Round 8 ====
3 September 2010
16:30

Boland Cavaliers	41–21	Falcons
Tries: A. Kock 30'c, 55'c J. Plaatjies 40'c C. Hendricks 48'c P.J. Vermeulen 60'c Con: L. Koen (3/3); J. Jansen (2/2); Pen: L. Koen 1', 19' (2/3); Cards: C. Lewis (yellow card) 44'; Zandre Jordaan (red card) 64'; Rossouw Kruger (yellow card) 71'	Scoreboard; Report	Tries: B. Fortuin 4'c, 14'c E. Gauche 79'c Con: M. Thomsen (2/2); J. Naudé (1/1); Cards: E. Gauche (yellow card) 46'; T. Bekker (yellow card) 49'

Boland Stadium, Wellington
Referee: Joey Salmans

3 September 2010
17:05

Griffons	27–18	Eastern Province Kings
Tries: W. Griesel 37'c H. Van der Nest 72'm Con: J. Myburgh (1/1); Pen: J. Myburgh 18', 57', 66' (3/5); T. Van Wyk 27', 30' (2/3)	Scoreboard; Report	Tries: P. Ferreira 6'm G. Odendaal 63'm, 72'm Pen: J. Van Schalkwyk 42' (1/2); Cards: Z. Mofu (yellow card) 73'

North West Stadium, Welkom
Attendance: 100
Referee: Stuart Berry

3 September 2010
19:05

Border Bulldogs	7–17	SWD Eagles
Tries: Y. Mkaza 65'c Con: J. Taljard (1/1); Cards: D. Meslane (yellow card) 56'	Scoreboard; Report	Tries: S. Raubenheimer 8'c B. Fortuin 46'c Con: A. Barends (2/2); Pen: A. Barends 16' (1/1)

Buffalo City Stadium, East London
Referee: Craig Joubert

==== Round 9 ====
10 September 2010
19:00

Eastern Province Kings	23–16	Boland Cavaliers
Tries: P. Perez 14'c, 73'c Con: M. Dumond (2/2); Pen: M. Dumond 1', 46', 52' (3/4); Cards: M. De Neuilly-Rice (yellow card) 32'	Scoreboard; Report	Tries: B. Immelman 34'c Con: J. Jansen (1/1); Pen: J. Jansen 37', 62', 75' (3/3)

Nelson Mandela Bay Stadium, Port Elizabeth
Referee: Marius Jonker

10 September 2010
19:05

SWD Eagles	42–27	Griffons
Tries: J. Breytenbach 19'm B. Joubert 34'c A. Barends 46'c S. Zweni 55'c, 61'c Con: A. Barends (4/5); Pen: A. Barends 6', 27' (2/2); J. Blom 12' (1/1); Cards: J. Terblanche (yellow card) 39'	Scoreboard; Report	Tries: R. Lamprecht 9'c E. Schultz 71'c Penalty try 78'c Con: T. Van Wyk (3/3); Pen: T. Van Wyk 2', 23' (2/3)

Outeniqua Park, George
Referee: Stuart Berry

Byes
Border Bulldogs	Falcons

==== Round 10 ====
17 September 2010
15:00

Falcons	35–50	Eastern Province Kings
Tries: S. Van der Walt 9'm E. Gauche 20'c J. Snyman 68'c K. Hendricks 75'm A. Hefer 80'm Con: M. Thomsen (2/5); Pen: M. Thomsen 19', 28' (2/3); Cards: C. Botha (yellow card) 48'	Scoreboard; Report	Tries: P. Perez 11'm N. Nelson 29'c, 41'c, 50'c, 54'c, 70'c D.W. Barry 57'c Con: M. Dumond (6/7); Pen: M. Dumond 24' (1/3)

Barnard Stadium, Kempton Park
Attendance: 500
Referee: Nathan Pearce

17 September 2010
16:30

Boland Cavaliers	38–33	SWD Eagles
Tries: A. Kock 26'c J. Jansen 33'c W. Le Roux 36'c B. Immelman 52'm Con: J. Jansen (3/4); Pen: J. Jansen 6', 30', 73' (3/4); DG: W. Le Roux 80' (1/1); Cards: C. Lewis (yellow card) 60'	Scoreboard; Report	Tries: S. Raubenheimer 60'c B. Joubert 66'c B. McBean 77'c Con: J. Blom (3/3); Pen: A. Barends 12', 17', 43' (3/3); J. Blom 82' (1/1)

Boland Stadium, Wellington
Attendance: 900
Referee: Mark Lawrence

18 September 2010
16:30

Griffons	48–33	Border Bulldogs
Tries: E. Fredericks 3'c S. Hancke 10'c A. Parsons 33'c, 38'c, 58'm E. Schultz 54'm W. Griesel 70'c Con: J. Myburgh (5/7); Pen: J. Myburgh 22' (1/1)	Scoreboard; Report	Tries: T. Mkoleli 18'c H. Noble 50'c D. Meslane 78'c Con: J. Taljard (3/3); Pen: J. Taljard 40', 42', 45', 67' (4/4)

North West Stadium, Welkom
Attendance: 300
Referee: Jaco Peyper

==== Round 11 ====
24 September 2010
17:05

SWD Eagles	57–28	Falcons
Tries: B. McBean 5'c, 26'c, 29'c W. Scott 7'm, 58'c S. Raubenheimer 18'm B. Joubert 49'c J. Breytenbach 64'c J. Terblanche 74'm Con: A. Barends (6/9); Cards: W. Scott (yellow card) 38'	Scoreboard; Report	Tries: C. Botha 41'c, 45'c C. Cronjé 55'c A. Klonaridis 68'c K. Hendricks 81'c Con: M. Thomsen (4/4); J. Naudé (1/1)

Outeniqua Park, George
Attendance: 1,000
Referee: Andrew Lees

24 September 2010
19:05

Border Bulldogs	13–54	Boland Cavaliers
Tries: N. Tonga 58'c Con: L. Basson (1/1); Pen: J. Taljard 4', 9' (2/2); Cards: N. Tonga (yellow card) 28'; J.P. Geldenhuys (yellow card) 35'	Scoreboard; Report	Tries: B. Immelman 13'c F. September 30'c B. Conradie 36'c, 39'm J. Plaatjies 41'c C. Hendricks 45'm E. Guiñazú 54'c Con: J. Jansen (5/7); Pen: J. Jansen 1', 16', 21' (3/3); Cards: G. Le Roux (yellow card) 28'; C. Hendricks (yellow card) 72'

Buffalo City Stadium, East London
Attendance: 1,000
Referee: Lourens van der Merwe

Byes
Eastern Province Kings	Griffons

==== Round 12 ====
1 October 2010
15:00

Boland Cavaliers	40–25	Griffons
Tries: Z. Jordaan 10'c W. Le Roux 33'c, 51'c B. April 37'c C. Hendricks 60'm J. Van Niekerk 68'c Con: J. Jansen (5/6)	Scoreboard; Report	Tries: W. Van Rooyen 25'm W. Griesel 42'c S. Hancke 64'm E. Fredericks 78'm Con: J. Myburgh (1/2); Pen: T. Van Wyk 55' (1/1)

Boland Stadium, Wellington
Attendance: 800
Referee: Joey Salmans

1 October 2010
19:00

Eastern Province Kings	8–25	SWD Eagles
Tries: P. Perez 7'm Pen: M. Dumond 43' (1/1); Cards: P. Ferreira (yellow card) 74'	Scoreboard; Report	Tries: B. McBean 16'm D. Hellmuth 63'm Pen: J. Blom 30' (1/1); A. Barends 46', 58', 74' (3/3); DG: A. Barends 69' (1/1); Cards: H. Eksteen (yellow card) 43'

Nelson Mandela Bay Stadium, Port Elizabeth
Attendance: 7,000
Referee: Sandile Mayende

2 October 2010
15:00

Falcons	49–56	Border Bulldogs
Tries: C. Cronjé 6'c, 39'c, 79'c J. Snyman 16'c M. Thomsen 27'c K. Hendricks 37'c, 52'c Con: M. Thomsen (5/5); J. Naudé (2/2); Cards: C. Yearsley (yellow card) 72'	Scoreboard; Report	Tries: L. Basson 19'c, 33'c H. Noble 25'c, 30'c, 75'c B. Mntunjani 35'm C. Booi 49'c Con: L. Basson (6/7); Pen: L. Basson 10', 23', 47'c (3/3)

Barnard Stadium, Kempton Park
Attendance: 1,000
Referee: Pro Legoete

=== Title play-off games ===
==== Semi-finals ====
8 October 2010
17:05

SWD Eagles	32–30	Griffons
Tries: J. Breytenbach 2'c, 36'm J. Engelbrecht 59'c B. McBean 64'c Con: A. Barends (3/4); Pen: A. Barends 9', 39' (2/2)	Scoreboard; Report	Tries: K. Stevens 14'c N. Steyn 20'c C. Weideman 25'c Con: J. Myburgh (3/3); Pen: J. Myburgh 30', 33', 67' (3/6); Cards: K. Stevens (yellow card) 22'; M. Briedenhann (yellow card) 54'

Outeniqua Park, George
Attendance: 1,000
Referee: Sandile Mayende

9 October 2010
19:10

Eastern Province Kings	26–25	Boland Cavaliers
Tries: G. Odendaal 34'c N. Nelson 36'c Con: M. Dumond (2/2); Pen: M. Dumond 9', 18', 61' (3/5); DG: M. Dumond 46' (1/3)	Scoreboard; Report	Tries: J. Jansen 12'm A. Kock 29'c B. April 49'c Con: J. Jansen (2/3); Pen: J. Jansen 24', 41' (2/3)

Nelson Mandela Bay Stadium, Port Elizabeth
Attendance: 10,000
Referee: Jaco Peyper

==== Final ====
15 October 2010
19:10

SWD Eagles	12–16	Eastern Province Kings
Pen: J. Blom 8', 21' (2/3); A. Barends 17', 72' (2/2)	Scoreboard; Report	Tries: Wayne Stevens 36'c Con: M. Dumond (1/1); Pen: M. Dumond 33', 43', 69' (3/6)

Outeniqua Park, George
Attendance: 8,600
Referee: Pro Legoete

== Promotion/Relegation Games ==
=== Tables ===
2010 Promotion/Relegation Games — Pumas v Eastern Province Kings
Pos	Team	Pld	W	D	L	PF	PA	PD	TF	TA	TB	LB	Pts
1	Pumas (P)	2	1	1	0	82	64	+18	12	7	0	0	6
2	Eastern Province Kings (F)	2	0	1	1	64	82	−18	7	12	0	0	2

Rules for classification: 4 points for a win; 2 points for a draw; 1 bonus point for a loss by seven points or less; 1 bonus point for scoring four or more tries in a match
(F) Qualified for the 2011 Currie Cup First Division; (P) Qualified for the 2011 Currie Cup Premier Division

2010 Promotion/Relegation Games — Platinum Leopards v SWD Eagles
Pos	Team	Pld	W	D	L	PF	PA	PD	TF	TA	TB	LB	Pts
1	Leopards (P)	2	1	0	1	65	54	+11	7	9	0	0	4
2	SWD Eagles (F)	2	1	0	1	54	65	−11	9	7	0	0	4

Rules for classification: 4 points for a win; 2 points for a draw; 1 bonus point for a loss by seven points or less; 1 bonus point for scoring four or more tries in a match
(F) Qualified for the 2011 Currie Cup First Division; (P) Qualified for the 2011 Currie Cup Premier Division

=== Results ===
- Pumas remain in the Currie Cup Premier Division.
- Leopards remain in the Currie Cup Premier Division.
- Eastern Province Kings remain in the Currie Cup First Division.
- SWD Eagles remain in the Currie Cup First Division.

=== Round 1 ===
22 October 2010
19:10

Pumas	36–36	Eastern Province Kings
Tries: T. Meyer 10'c C. Steenkamp 35'm V. Willis 42'm R. Uys 45'm A. Kettledas 53'c E. Watts 70'c Con: E. Watts (1/3); C. Bezuidenhout (2/3)	Scoreboard; Report	Tries: P. Perez 13'm N. Nelson 22'c D.W. Barry 30'm D. Oosthuizen 58'c Con: M. Dumond (2/4); Pen: M. Dumond 2', 49', 65', 79' (4/6)

Puma Stadium, Witbank
Attendance: 1,000
Referee: Marius Jonker

23 October 2010
16:00

Leopards	37–22	SWD Eagles
Tries: S. Marais 25'c, 78'c D. Dames 32'c, 65'c Con: C. Durand (4/4); Pen: C. Durand 9', 15', 22' (3/5); Cards: W. Venter (yellow card) 48'	Scoreboard; Report	Tries: S. Raubenheimer 18'm D. Hellmuth 50'c L. Hartnick 55'm D. Manuel 68'm Con: A. Barends (1/3)

Profert Olën Park, Potchefstroom
Attendance: 1,000
Referee: Craig Joubert

=== Round 2 ===
29 October 2010
17:00

SWD Eagles	32–28	Leopards
Tries: H. Grimes 6'c H. Grobler 28'm J. Engelbrecht 38'm S. Raubenheimer 51'm J. Terblanche 63'c Con: A. Barends (2/5); Pen: A. Barends 25' (1/1)	Scoreboard; Report	Tries: R.W. Kember 20'c S.P. Marais 75'm W. Venter 78'c Con: C. Durand (1/1); S.P. Marais (1/2); Pen: C. Durand 12', 19', 46' (3/3)

Outeniqua Park, George
Attendance: 15,000
Referee: Jaco Peyper

29 October 2010
19:05

Eastern Province Kings	28–46	Pumas
Tries: W. Stevens 7'c, 34'c J.J. Gagiano 15'm Con: M. Dumond (2/3); Pen: M. Dumond 40', 52', 56' (3/5); Cards: P. Nodikida (yellow card) 49'	Scoreboard	Tries: D. Le Roux 22'c, 47'c A. Kruger 38'm C. Steenkamp 43'c D. Steyn 63'c V. Willis 80'c Con: C. Bezuidenhout (5/6); Pen: C. Bezuidenhout 29', 74' (2/2)

Nelson Mandela Bay Stadium, Port Elizabeth
Attendance: 45,000
Referee: Jonathan Kaplan

== Top scorers ==
The following sections contain only points and tries which have been scored in competitive games in the 2010 Currie Cup First Division.

=== Top points scorers ===
Rank	Player	Team	Points
1	Ambrose Barends	SWD Eagles	133
2	Jacquin Jansen	Boland Cavaliers	119
3	Jannie Myburgh	Griffons	96
4	Logan Basson	Border Bulldogs	87
5	Monty Dumond	Eastern Province Kings	58
6	Coert Cronjé	Falcons	45
6	Norman Nelson	Eastern Province Kings	45
6	Jeff Taljard	Border Bulldogs	45
9	Jandré Blom	SWD Eagles	43
9	Martin Thomsen	Falcons	43

Last updated: 15 October 2010
Source: South African Rugby Union

=== Top try scorers ===
Rank	Player	Team	Tries
1	Coert Cronjé	Falcons	9
1	Norman Nelson	Eastern Province Kings	9
3	Cornal Hendricks	Boland Cavaliers	8
4	Kyle Hendricks	Falcons	7
4	Baldwin McBean	SWD Eagles	7
6	Joe Breytenbach	SWD Eagles	6
6	Werner Griesel	Griffons	6
6	JW Jonker	Griffons	6
6	Willie le Roux	Boland Cavaliers	6
6	Jeremy Plaatjies	Boland Cavaliers	6
6	Shaun Raubenheimer	SWD Eagles	6
6	Hendrik van der Nest	Griffons	6

Last updated: 15 October 2010
Source: South African Rugby Union

== See also ==
- 2010 Currie Cup Premier Division
- 2010 Vodacom Cup
- ABSA
- Currie Cup
