= 2014 SARU Community Cup =

- Countries: South Africa
- Date: 8 March – 21 April 2014
- Champions: Rustenburg Impala
- Runners-up: Roodepoort
- Matches played: 52
- Tries scored: 389 (average 7.5 per match)
- Top point scorer: Monty Dumond (107)
- Top try scorer: Billy Mintoor (10)

The 2014 SARU Community Cup (known as the 2014 Cell C Community Cup for sponsorship reasons) was the second season of the SARU Community Cup competition. The qualification to the tournament took place in 2013, while the competition proper was contested in 2014. The tournament is the top competition for non-university rugby union clubs in South Africa.

== Competition ==
=== Qualification format ===
Qualification to the Community Cup was determined via the club leagues of the fourteen provincial unions, plus Blue Bulls Limpopo. All university and other tertiary institutions were ineligible to participate in the Community Cup.

The highest-placed eligible team in each of the fifteen leagues automatically qualified to the Community Cup (league rules determined if this is after the league stages or after the title-play-offs). As holders, Despatch were guaranteed qualification to the Community Cup. In addition, wildcard teams chosen by SARU also qualified to take the number of participants up to twenty. Teams that participated in the 2013 Community Cup were not eligible for the wildcard draw for the 2014 Community Cup.

=== Finals format ===
The format of the Community Cup was the same as the Rugby World Cup. The teams were divided into four pools, each containing five teams. They then played four pool games, playing other teams in their respective pools once. Each team played two home games and two away games.

The winner and runner-up of each pool entered the play-off stage, held at a central venue over the Easter long weekend each year. The play-offs consisted of quarter finals, semi-finals and the final. The winner of each pool met the runner-up of a different pool in a quarter final. The winner of each quarter-final went on to the semi-finals and the semi-final winners to the final, to be held at a neutral venue.

The losing semi-finalists played each other in the Plate final. The losing quarter finalists met in the Bowl semi-final, the winners of which played in the Bowl final, the losers playing in the Shield final.

== Qualification ==
The highest-placed non-university clubs in the 2013 season of each of the fourteen provincial unions' club leagues, as well as defending champions Despatch and wildcard teams all qualified to the 2014 SARU Community Cup competition.

=== Blue Bulls ===
The log leader after the pool stage qualified to the 2014 SARU Community Cup. The play-off finals have no bearing on qualification to the 2014 SARU Community Cup.

2013 Blue Bulls Carlton League
Pos	Team	Pl	W	D	L	PF	PA	PD	BP	Pts	Comments
1	UP Tuks	7	6	1	0	374	132	+242	6	32	Ineligible
2	Centurion	7	5	1	1	315	140	+175	6	28	Qualified
3	Oostelike Eagles	7	5	0	2	210	175	+35	4	24	Wildcard draw
4	Pretoria Police	7	4	0	3	269	158	+111	7	23	
5	Pretoria Harlequins	7	3	0	4	247	179	+68	5	17	
6	TUT Vikings	7	2	0	5	173	222	–49	3	11	Ineligible
7	Naka Bulls	7	2	0	5	171	303	–132	2	10	
8	Silver Valke	7	0	0	7	53	503	–450	0	0	Withdrew
Final standings. Centurion qualified to the 2014 SARU Community Cup as the highest-placed non-university team. Oostelike Eagles qualified to the wildcard draw.

==== Semi-finals ====
8 June 2013	UP Tuks	38 – 23	Pretoria Police

8 June 2013	Centurion	14 – 16	Oostelike Eagles

==== Final ====
15 June 2013	UP Tuks	43 – 14	Oostelike Eagles

=== Blue Bulls Limpopo ===
The play-off final winner qualified to the 2014 SARU Community Cup.

2013 Blue Bulls Limpopo Boet Fick Senior League
Pos	Team	Pl	W	D	L	PF	PA	PD	BP	Pts	Comments
1	Noordelikes	10	9	0	1	323	73	+250	8	44	Qualified
2	Pietersburg	10	7	0	3	360	160	+200	7	35	
3	Letaba	10	6	1	3	290	133	+157	7	33	
4	Louis Trichardt	10	5	1	4	238	183	+55	5	27	Withdrew
5	Messina	10	0	2	8	20	329	–309	0	4	
6	Loskop	10	0	2	8	3	358	–355	0	4	Withdrew
Final standings. Noordelikes qualified to the 2014 SARU Community Cup as the highest-placed non-university team.

==== Semi-finals ====
7 September 2013	Noordelikes	64 – 10	Louis Trichardt

7 September 2013	Pietersburg	22 – 15	Letaba

==== Final ====
14 September 2013	Noordelikes	28 – 9	Pietersburg

=== Boland ===
The log leader after the pool stage qualified to the 2014 SARU Community Cup.

2013 Boland Premier League
Pos	Team	Pl	W	D	L	PF	PA	PD	BP	Pts	Comments
1	Roses United	18	16	0	2	726	337	+389	14	78	Qualified
2	Wesbank	18	15	0	3	580	307	+273	13	73	Wildcard draw
3	Villagers Worcester	18	13	0	5	602	306	+296	16	68	
4	Hawston	18	11	0	7	506	465	+41	11	55	
5	Saldanha	18	10	0	8	469	416	+53	12	52	
6	Ceres	18	8	0	10	394	378	+16	11	43	
7	Robertson	18	8	0	10	475	557	–82	11	43	
8	Vredenburg	18	5	0	13	358	498	–140	12	32	
9	Wellington	18	4	0	14	309	618	–309	10	26	
10	Black Leaves	18	0	0	18	246	783	–537	0	0	Relegated
Final standings. Roses United qualified to the 2014 SARU Community Cup as the league winner. Wesbank qualified to the wildcard draw.

=== Border ===
The play-off final winner qualified to the 2014 SARU Community Cup.

2013 Border Premier League Pool A
Pos	Team	Pl	W	D	L	PF	PA	PD	BP	Pts	Comments
1	Buffalo	9	7	1	1	378	128	+250	7	37	
2	Winter Rose	9	7	1	1	216	123	+93	4	34	
3	WSU All Blacks	9	6	1	2	223	156	+67	6	32	Ineligible
4	Berlin Tigers	9	5	0	4	164	117	+47	5	25	
5	Breakers	9	4	1	4	195	191	+4	6	24	
6	Swallows	9	4	0	5	246	190	+56	5	21	
7	Ntlaza Lions	9	3	1	5	147	216	–69	3	17	Relegated
8	Young Leopards	9	4	0	5	107	196	–89	1	17	Relegated
9	Africans	9	1	1	7	143	244	–101	3	9	Relegated
10	Wallabies	9	1	0	8	82	340	–258	1	5	Relegated
2013 Border Premier League Pool B
1	UFH Blues	9	8	0	1	411	99	+312	8	40	Ineligible
2	East London Police	9	8	0	1	465	102	+363	7	39	Wildcard draw
3	Old Selbornians	9	8	0	1	287	84	+203	5	37	Qualified
4	Cambridge	9	6	0	3	224	192	+32	4	28	
5	Old Collegians	9	3	2	4	127	190	–63	2	18	
6	Ready Blues	9	3	1	5	119	248	–129	1	15	
7	Ocean Sweepers	9	2	1	6	155	308	–153	4	14	Relegated
8	Ngculu Zebras	9	3	0	6	92	263	–171	1	13	Relegated
9	King Brumbies	9	2	0	7	85	287	–202	1	9	Relegated
10	Evergreen	9	0	0	9	31	223	–192	2	2	Relegated
Final standings. Old Selbornians qualified to the 2014 SARU Community Cup by reaching the play-off final. East London Police qualified to the wildcard draw.

==== Quarter-finals ====
24 August 2013	Buffalo	22 – 12	Cambridge

24 August 2013	UFH Blues	20 – 8	Berlin Tigers

24 August 2013	Winter Rose	24 – 38	Old Selbornians

24 August 2013	East London Police	25 – 10	WSU All Blacks

==== Semi-finals ====
18 September 2013	Buffalo	10 – 23	Old Selbornians

18 September 2013	UFH Blues	27 – 22	East London Police

==== Final ====
28 September 2013	UFH Blues	20 – 25	Old Selbornians

=== Eastern Province ===
The log leader after the pool stage qualified to the 2014 SARU Community Cup. Despatch qualified as the holders. The play-off finals have no bearing on qualification to the 2014 SARU Community Cup.

2013 Eastern Province Grand Challenge
Pos	Team	Pl	W	D	L	PF	PA	PD	BP	Pts	Comments
1	NMMU Madibaz	15	14	0	1	886	160	+726	14	70	Ineligible
2	Despatch	15	13	0	2	666	227	+439	13	65	Qualified
3	Spring Rose	15	13	0	2	477	226	+251	7	59	Wildcard draw
4	Progress	15	11	0	4	397	297	+100	8	52	
5	Gardens	15	11	0	4	349	231	+118	7	51	
6	Harlequins	15	9	0	6	434	271	+163	10	46	
7	Crusaders	15	9	1	5	328	339	–11	6	44	
8	African Bombers	15	7	1	7	317	247	+70	8	38	
9	Kruisfontein	15	7	0	8	341	400	–59	8	36	
10	SAPS	15	6	1	8	343	411	–68	8	34	
11	Grahamstown Brumbies	15	6	0	9	368	577	–209	6	30	
12	Park	15	5	0	10	301	434	–133	7	27	
13	United Barbarians	15	3	0	12	234	426	–192	5	17	Relegated
14	Suburban	15	3	0	12	203	558	–355	2	14	Relegated
15	Orlando Eagles	15	1	1	13	230	563	–333	7	13	Relegated
16	St Mark's	15	1	0	14	186	693	–507	4	8	Relegated
Final standings. Despatch qualified to the 2014 SARU Community Cup as holders. Spring Rose qualified to the wildcard draw.

=== Free State ===
The log leader after the pool stage qualified to the 2014 SARU Community Cup. The play-off finals have no bearing on qualification to the 2014 SARU Community Cup.

2013 Free State 1st League
Pos	Team	Pl	W	D	L	PF	PA	PD	BP	Pts	Comments
1	UFS Shimlas	10	9	0	1	512	135	+377	10	46	Ineligible
2	CUT Ixias	10	8	0	2	453	194	+259	7	39	Ineligible
3	UFS Irawas	10	7	0	3	449	223	+226	7	35	Ineligible
4	Bloemfontein Crusaders	10	4	0	6	212	272	–60	5	21	Qualified
5	CUT Tjisas	10	1	0	9	170	551	–381	4	8	Ineligible, Withdrew
6	Bloemfontein Police	10	0	0	10	138	559	–421	4	8	
Final standings. Bloemfontein Crusaders qualified to the 2014 SARU Community Cup as the highest-placed non-university team.

==== Stadsbeker ====
The Stadsbeker is the title play-off matches.

===== Semi-final =====
11 June 2013	CUT Ixias	20 – 31	UFS Irawas

===== Final =====
15 June 2013	UFS Shimlas	17 – 5	UFS Irawas

==== Rowan Cup ====
The Rowan Cup is the play-off for fourth to sixth place.

===== Semi-final =====
11 June 2013	CUT Tjisas	40 – 41	Bloemfontein Police

===== Final =====
15 June 2013	Bloemfontein Crusaders	41 – 25	Bloemfontein Police

=== Golden Lions ===
The log leader after the pool stage qualified to the 2014 SARU Community Cup.

2013 Golden Lions Pirates Grand Challenge
Pos	Team	Pl	W	D	L	PF	PA	PD	BP	Pts	Comments
1	Roodepoort	9	9	0	0	351	140	+211	7	43	Qualified
2	UJ	9	7	0	2	503	114	+389	10	38	Ineligible
3	Wits	9	7	0	2	473	145	+328	8	36	Ineligible
4	Raiders	9	6	0	3	397	237	+160	7	31	
5	Pirates	9	5	0	4	275	295	–20	5	25	Wildcard draw
6	Wanderers	9	4	0	5	286	270	+16	6	22	
7	Randfontein	9	3	0	6	307	373	–66	7	19	
8	Union	9	3	0	6	241	378	–137	2	14	
9	Alberton	9	1	0	8	143	412	–269	2	6	
10	Diggers	9	0	0	9	101	713	–612	0	–3	Deducted points for withdrawals.
Final standings. Roodepoort qualified to the 2014 SARU Community Cup as the champions. Pirates qualified to the wildcard draw.

=== Griffons ===
The play-off final winner qualified to the 2014 SARU Community Cup.

2013 Griffons 1st League
Pos	Team	Pl	W	D	L	PF	PA	PD	BP	Pts	Comments
1	Welkom Rovers	11								38	Qualified
2	Welkom	11								35	Wildcard draw
3	Henneman	11								23	
4	Kroonstad	11								17	
Final standings. Welkom Rovers qualified to the 2014 SARU Community Cup as the play-off final winner. Welkom qualified to the wildcard draw.

==== Semi-finals ====
5 July 2013	Welkom	34 – 21	Henneman

5 July 2013	Welkom Rovers	30 – 10	Kroonstad

==== Final ====
9 September 2013	Welkom Rovers	14 – 13	Welkom

=== Griquas ===
The log leader after the pool stage qualified to the 2014 SARU Community Cup.

2013 Griquas Super League
Pos	Team	Pl	W	D	L	PF	PA	PD	BP	Pts	Comments
1	Sishen	10	9	0	1	438	207	+231	9	45	Qualified
2	Kimberley Police	10	7	0	3	332	299	+33	6	34	Wildcard draw
3	Upington Dorp	9	4	0	5	290	311	–21	7	23	
4	Kuruman	9	3	1	5	230	201	+29	7	21	
5	Upington United	9	2	0	7	190	357	–167	5	13	
6	Postmasburg	7	1	1	5	143	267	–124	3	9	
Final standings. Sishen qualified to the 2014 SARU Community Cup as the champions. Kimberley Police qualified to the wildcard draw.

=== KwaZulu-Natal ===
The log leader after the pool stage qualified to the 2014 SARU Community Cup.

2013 KwaZulu-Natal Moor Cup
Pos	Team	Pl	W	D	L	PF	PA	PD	BP	Pts	Comments
1	College Rovers	14	14	0	0	756	160	+596	13	69	Qualified
2	Durban Collegians	13	10	1	2	488	180	+308	9	51	Wildcard draw
3	Durban Crusaders	14	10	1	3	427	284	+143	9	51	
4	Varsity College	14	8	0	6	434	349	+135	8	40	
5	UKZN Impi	14	6	0	8	300	410	–110	7	31	Ineligible
6	Pietermaritzburg Collegians	14	2	1	11	193	545	–352	3	13	
7	Zululand Rhinos	13	2	0	11	203	476	–273	2	10	
8	Harlequins	14	1	1	12	181	578	–397	3	9	Relegated
Final standings. College Rovers qualified to the 2014 SARU Community Cup as the champions. Durban Collegians qualified to the wildcard draw.

=== Leopards ===
A play-off would be held between Rustenburg Impala, either Klerksdorp or Vaal Reefs and the possibly winner of the Neser A League final, with play-off winner qualifying to the 2014 SARU Community Cup.

2013 Leopards Neser A League
Pos	Team	Pl	W	D	L	PF	PA	PD	BP	Pts	Comments
1	Potch Dorp	10	9	1	0	319	89	+230	7	45	
2	Leeudoringstad	10	7	0	3	213	229	–16	5	33	
3	Vryburg	10	5	0	5	292	201	+91	9	29	
4	Hartbeesfontein	10	5	0	5	287	263	+24	8	28	
5	Lichtenburg	10	3	1	6	229	269	–40	4	18	
6	Matlosana	10	0	0	10	101	390	–289	1	1	
Final standings. Rustenburg Impala qualified to the 2014 SARU Community Cup following a walkover in the qualifier match. Vaal Reefs qualified to the wildcard draw.

==== Semi-finals ====
29 June 2013	Leeudoringstad	31 – 22	Vryburg

29 June 2013	Potch Dorp	50 – 15	Hartbeesfontein

==== Final ====
6 July 2013	Potch Dorp	29 – 0	Leeudoringstad

==== Qualifier ====
21 September 2013	Rustenburg Impala	walkover	Vaal Reefs

=== Mpumalanga ===
The play-off final winner qualified to the 2014 SARU Community Cup.

2013 Mpumalanga Buscor League
Pos	Team	Pl	W	D	L	PF	PA	PD	BP	Pts	Comments
1	Witbank Ferros	12	11	0	1	560	185	+375	8	52	Qualified
2	Middelburg	12	10	0	2	453	187	+266	9	49	Wildcard draw
3	Malelane	12	8	0	4	459	268	+191	9	41	
4	Nelspruit	12	5	0	7	344	507	–163	8	28	
5	Sasol	12	4	0	8	363	426	–63	9	25	
6	White River	12	3	0	9	257	508	–251	4	16	
7	Lydenburg Rooikatte	12	1	0	11	254	569	–315	5	9	
Final standings. Witbank Ferros qualified to the 2014 SARU Community Cup as the play-off final winner. Middelburg qualified to the wildcard draw.

==== Semi-finals ====
27 July 2013	Witbank Ferros	walkover	Nelspruit

27 July 2013	Middelburg	27 – 30	Malelane

==== Final ====
10 August 2013	Witbank Ferros	62 – 25	Malelane

=== South Western Districts ===
The play-off final winner qualified to the 2014 SARU Community Cup.

2013 South Western Districts Premier League
Pos	Team	Pl	W	D	L	PF	PA	PD	BP	Pts	Comments
1	Evergreens	22	19	2	1	786	379	+407	14	94	
2	Mossel Bay Barbarians	22	17	2	3	734	305	+429	15	87	Wildcard draw
3	Groot-Brakrivier	22	15	1	6	697	435	+262	15	77	
4	Bridgton	22	13	3	6	631	441	+190	13	71	Qualified
5	Silver Stars	22	13	0	9	626	498	+128	17	69	
6	Blanco	22	9	1	12	582	493	+89	11	49	
7	Crusaders	22	8	0	13	596	558	+38	14	46	
8	Progress	22	9	1	12	470	524	–54	7	45	
9	Bonnievale United	21	7	0	14	475	678	–203	12	40	
10	All Blacks	21	5	0	16	416	782	–366	9	29	
11	Uniondale	22	4	0	18	363	785	–422	8	24	
12	Swellendam	21	2	0	19	253	751	–498	4	12	Relegated
Final standings. Bridgton qualified to the 2014 SARU Community Cup as the play-off final winner. Mossel Bay Barbarians qualified to the wildcard draw.

==== Semi-finals ====
14 September 2013	Evergreens	25 – 31	Bridgton

14 September 2013	Mossel Bay Barbarians	31 – 25	Groot-Brakrivier

==== Final ====
28 September 2013	Mossel Bay Barbarians	24 – 25	Bridgton

=== Valke ===
The play-off final winner qualified to the 2014 SARU Community Cup.

2013 Valke Peregrine League
Pos	Team	Pl	W	D	L	PF	PA	PD	BP	Pts	Comments
1	Brakpan	8	8	0	0	426	94	+332	8	40	Qualified
2	Boksburg	8	6	0	2	390	223	+167	5	29	Wildcard draw
3	Springs	8	4	0	4	284	200	+84	4	20	
4	NWU Vaal Triangle	8	1	0	7	156	351	–195	4	8	Ineligible
5	Kempton Wolwe	8	1	0	7	75	463	–388	0	1	
Final standings. Brakpan qualified to the 2014 SARU Community Cup as the play-off final winner. Boksburg qualified to the wildcard draw.

==== Final ====
13 July 2013	Brakpan	51 – 26	Boksburg

=== Western Province ===
The log leader after the pool stage qualified to the 2014 SARU Community Cup.

2013 Western Province Super League A
Pos	Team	Pl	W	D	L	PF	PA	PD	BP	Pts	Comments
1	Maties	18	16	0	2	748	227	+521	13	77	Ineligible
2	Hamiltons	18	14	0	4	657	308	+349	13	69	Qualified
3	UCT Ikey Tigers	18	14	1	3	492	282	+210	11	69	Ineligible
4	Durbanville-Bellville	18	12	1	5	537	399	+138	11	61	
5	Victorians	18	9	1	8	453	466	–13	12	50	Ineligible
6	SK Walmers	18	7	0	11	372	509	–137	7	35	
7	Tygerberg	18	6	0	12	393	617	–224	8	32	Wildcard draw
8	Belhar	18	3	2	13	312	528	–216	9	25	
9	Bellville	18	3	1	14	315	603	–288	10	24	
10	Helderberg	18	3	0	15	298	638	–340	7	19	
Final standings. Hamiltons qualified to the 2014 SARU Community Cup as the highest-placed non-university team.. Tygerberg qualified to the wildcard draw.

=== Wildcard draw ===
Provincial unions could also enter one team that did not participate in the 2013 Community Cup into the wildcard draw. Teams that played in the 2013 SARU Community Cup were ineligible for wildcard nomination in 2014.

These teams were nominated for the wildcard draw:

- Boksburg (Valke)
- Durban Collegians (KwaZulu-Natal)
- Kimberley Police (Griquas)
- Middelburg (Mpumalanga)
- Mossel Bay Barbarians (South Western Districts)
- Oostelikes Eagles (Blue Bulls)
- Pirates (Golden Lions)
- Police (Border)
- Spring Rose (Eastern Province)
- Tygerberg (Western Province)
- Vaal Reefs (Leopards)
- Welkom (Griffons)
- Wesbank (Boland)

On 4 November 2013, SARU named the following teams as the wildcard entries for the 2014 Community Cup:

- Boksburg (Valke)
- Mossel Bay Barbarians (South Western Districts)
- Spring Rose (Eastern Province)
- Welkom (Griffons)
- Wesbank (Boland)

== Teams ==
The following teams qualified for the 2014 SARU Community Cup:

Location of teams in the 2014 SARU Community Cup
Pool A
Pool B
Pool C
Pool D
Location of Gauteng-based teams in the 2014 SARU Community Cup
Pool A
Pool B
Pool C
Pool D

=== Team listing ===
Team	Sponsored Name	Union	Entry Type
Bloemfontein Crusaders	Bloemfontein Crusaders	Free State	Qualified
Boksburg	Kaufela Boksburg	Valke	Wildcard
Brakpan	G5 Metals Brakpan	Valke	Qualified
Bridgton	Bridgton	South Western Districts	Qualified
Centurion	Refreshhh! Centurion	Blue Bulls	Qualified
College Rovers	Jonsson College Rovers	KwaZulu-Natal	Qualified
Despatch	Gap Management Despatch	Eastern Province	Holders
Hamiltons	Hamiltons	Western Province	Qualified
Mossel Bay Barbarians	Mossel Bay Barbarians	South Western Districts	Wildcard
Noordelikes	BB Truck Noordelikes	Blue Bulls Limpopo	Qualified
Old Selbornians	Kempston Old Selbornians	Border	Qualified
Roodepoort	Roodepoort	Golden Lions	Qualified
Roses United	Roses United	Boland	Qualified
Rustenburg Impala	Rustenburg Impala	Leopards	Qualified
Sishen	Sishen	Griquas	Qualified
Spring Rose	Spring Rose	Eastern Province	Wildcard
Welkom	E-Car Welkom	Griffons	Wildcard
Welkom Rovers	Eagle Towing Rovers	Griffons	Qualified
Wesbank	Wesbank	Boland	Wildcard
Witbank Ferros	Shumba Ferro's	Mpumalanga	Qualified

== Pool Stages ==
On 23 August 2013, the draw was made for the 2014 SARU Community Cup and the 20 teams were drawn in the 4 pools. The fixtures were released on 15 November 2013.

=== Pool A ===
==== Log ====
2014 SARU Community Cup Pool A Log
Pos	Team	Pl	W	D	L	PF	PA	PD	TF	TA	TB	LB	Pts
1	Despatch	4	4	0	0	147	34	+113	20	3	3	0	19
2	Old Selbornians	4	3	0	1	109	84	+25	13	11	2	0	14
3	Spring Rose	4	2	0	2	77	90	–13	9	11	1	1	10
4	Mossel Bay Barbarians	4	1	0	3	86	106	–20	12	15	2	1	7
5	Bridgton	4	0	0	4	44	149	–105	6	20	0	1	1
* Legend: Pos = Position, Pl = Played, W = Won, D = Drawn, L = Lost, PF = Points for, PA = Points against, PD = Points difference, TF = Tries For, TA = Tries Against, TB = Try bonus points, LB = Losing bonus points, Pts = Log points Despatch and Old Selbornians qualified for the finals. Points breakdown: *4 points for a win *2 points for a draw *1 bonus point for a loss by seven points or less *1 bonus point for scoring four or more tries in a match

==== Fixtures and results ====
===== Round one =====
8 March 2014	Despatch	24–6	Spring Rose	WJ de Wet Stadium, Despatch
14:30	Try: Jaco Bekker 20'; Billy Mintoor 77'; Con: Monty Dumond 20' (1/2); Pen: Monty Dumond 14', 30', 53', 69' (4/5); Cards: Ayanda Nogampula (yellow card) 42' to 53'; Jaco Bekker (yellow card) 47' to 57'	Scoreboard	Pen: Thulani Meki 47', 64' (2/2)	Referee: Christie du Preez

8 March 2014	Mossel Bay Barbarians	32–13	Bridgton	D'Almeida Stadium, Mossel Bay
16:00	Try: Alvizo Maurice Erasmus 6'; Logan Hendricks 33'; Jerome Fillies 42'; Jaco Arendse 64'; Wahlon Antony 72'; Con: Francois Jacobus Smith (0/1); Morne Buis 42', 64' (2/4); Pen: Morne Buis 40' (1/2); Wahlon Antony (0/1); Cards: Francois Jacobus Smith (yellow card) 60'	Scoreboard	Try: Enzo Erasmus 12'; Adriaan Booysen 54'; Con: Adriaan Booysen (0/1); Pen: Adriaan Booysen 17' (1/3); Cards: Rhupino Plaatjies (yellow card) 40' to 50'	Attendance: 3,000; Referee: Ruhan Meiring

Bye/s: Old Selbornians

===== Round two =====
15 March 2014	Spring Rose	19–20	Old Selbornians	New Brighton Oval, Epakeni, Port Elizabeth
15:30	Try: Siviwe Moyake 20', 78'; Con: Thulani Meki (0/2); Pen: Thulani Meki 1', 9', 29' (3/3)	Scoreboard	Try: Michael Amui 24'; Craig Shone 36'; Duran Alberts 74'; Con: Craig Shone 37' (1/3); Pen: Craig Shone 16' (1/3); Cards: MJ le Marquand (yellow card) 66' to 76'	Referee: Jadezweni Cwengile

15 March 2014	Bridgton	7–54	Despatch	Bridgton Sports Grounds, Oudtshoorn
16:00	Try: Algernon Waarts 49'; Con: Adriaan Booysen 50' (1/1); Pen: Adriaan Booysen (0/3); Cards: Ronald Bratz (yellow card) 15' to 27'	Scoreboard	Try: Baldwin McBean 11', 18', 75'; Monty Dumond 26'; Trichardt van Tonder 36'; Billy Mintoor 43'; Bobby Dyer 67'; Elroy Ligman 80'; Con: Monty Dumond 12', 19', 27', 37', 43', 67', 76' (7/8); Cards: Michael Vermaak (yellow card) 29' to 39'	Attendance: 2,600; Referee: Ruhan Meiring

Bye/s: Mossel Bay Barbarians

===== Round three =====
22 March 2014	Despatch	31–5	Mossel Bay Barbarians	WJ de Wet Stadium, Despatch
16:00	Try: Stephan Deyzel 10'; Monty Dumond 40'; Renier Erasmus 71'; Basil de Doncker 78'; Con: Monty Dumond 11', 40', 72', 78' (4/4); Pen: Monty Dumond 28' (1/2); Cards: Ashley Viviers (yellow card) 60' to 70'	Scoreboard	Try: Logan Hendricks 21'; Con: Morné Buis (0/1); Pen: Macdelin Claudio Saayman (0/1); Wahlon Antony (0/1); Cards: Cardio Jones (yellow card) 32' to 42'	Referee: Lusanda Jam

22 March 2014	Old Selbornians	43–7	Bridgton	Kempston Park, East London
16:00	Try: Craig Gombert 30'; Curtis Kleinhans 34'; Bradley Birkholtz 36', 57'; André van Niekerk 39'; Con: Craig Shone 31', 40' (2/5); Pen: Craig Shone 8', 13', 18', 22' (4/4); Cards: André van Niekerk (yellow card) 79'	Scoreboard	Try: Grahame September 67'; Con: Rhupino Plaatjies 68' (1/1); Pen: Warren Malgas (0/2); Cards: Ruahl Lewis (yellow card) 38' to 48'	Referee: Archie Sehlako

Bye/s: Spring Rose

===== Round four =====
29 March 2014	Bridgton	17–20	Spring Rose	Bridgton Sports Grounds, Oudtshoorn
16:00	Try: Rhupino Plaatjies 32'; Hadley Arries 63'; Con: Adriaan Booysen 32', 63' (2/2); Pen: Adriaan Booysen 4' (1/2); Cards: Ronald Bratz (yellow card) 70'; Adriaan Booysen (yellow card) 76'	Scoreboard	Try: Gugu Makwabe 23'; Bongani Ngqolombe 71'; Con: Pumezo Tom 24', 71' (2/2); Pen: Pumezo Tom 19', 76' (2/3); Cards: Bongani Ngqolombe (yellow card) 78'	Attendance: 1,200; Referee: Lusanda Jam

29 March 2014	Mossel Bay Barbarians	20–30	Old Selbornians	D'Almeida Stadium, Mossel Bay
16:00	Try: Jerome Fillies 56'; Morne Buis 63'; Con: Morne Buis 56', 63' (2/2); Pen: Morne Buis 2', 51' (2/2)	Scoreboard	Try: Peter Smith 21'; Sinethemba Tyokolwana 33'; Lindani Gulwa 59'; Bradley Birkholtz 77'; Con: Warren Rielly 22', 34' (2/4); Pen: Warren Rielly 7', 30' (2/3)	Attendance: 2,657; Referee: Renier Vermeulen

Bye/s: Despatch

===== Round five =====
5 April 2014	Spring Rose	32–29	Mossel Bay Barbarians	New Brighton Oval, Epakeni, Port Elizabeth
15:30	Try: Thembekile Mtaba 19', 48'; Langa Tsotsobe 43'; Siviwe Moyake 52'; Zolani Faba 74'; Con: Thulani Meki 44', 49' (2/3); Pumezo Tom (0/2); Pen: Pumezo Tom 80' (1/1); Cards: Langa Tsotsobe (yellow card) 61' to 71'	Scoreboard	Try: Jaco Arendse 6'; Logan Hendricks 25'; Isaac Treurnicht 28'; Jerome Fillies 34'; Con: Morne Buis 7', 26', 35' (3/4); Pen: Morne Buis 21' (1/1); Cards: Jerome Fillies (yellow card) 50'	Referee: Christie du Preez

5 April 2014	Old Selbornians	16–38	Despatch	Kempston Park, East London
16:00	Try: MJ le Marquand 14'; Con: Warren Rielly 15' (1/1); Pen: Warren Rielly 7', 17', 28' (3/3)	Scoreboard	Try: Robert Slabbert 11'; Billy Mintoor 21', 26', 44', 68'; Monty Dumond 65'; Con: Monty Dumond 27', 44', 66', 69' (4/4)	Referee: Daniel Fortuin

Bye/s: Bridgton

=== Pool B ===
==== Log ====
2014 SARU Community Cup Pool B Log
Pos	Team	Pl	W	D	L	PF	PA	PD	TF	TA	TB	LB	Pts
1	College Rovers	4	4	0	0	230	48	+182	35	6	4	0	20
2	Roodepoort	4	3	0	1	151	89	+62	18	11	1	0	13
3	Bloemfontein Crusaders	4	2	0	2	122	140	–18	17	20	2	1	11
4	Welkom Rovers	4	1	0	3	106	108	–2	15	12	2	1	7
5	Welkom	4	0	0	4	38	262	–224	4	40	0	0	0
* Legend: Pos = Position, Pl = Played, W = Won, D = Drawn, L = Lost, PF = Points for, PA = Points against, PD = Points difference, TF = Tries For, TA = Tries Against, TB = Try bonus points, LB = Losing bonus points, Pts = Log points College Rovers and Roodepoort qualified for the finals. Points breakdown: *4 points for a win *2 points for a draw *1 bonus point for a loss by seven points or less *1 bonus point for scoring four or more tries in a match

==== Fixtures and results ====
===== Round one =====
8 March 2014	College Rovers	85–0	Welkom	KP3, Kings Park, Durban
13:00	Try: Kyle Wilkinson 3', 28'; Christopher Micklewood 8'; Jean Pretorius 15'; Jors Dannhauser 24'; Quinton Crocker 26', 79'; Warrick Venter 47'; Kelvin Adam 56'; Shannon Rick 58', 70', 77'; Nikolai Blignaut 65'; Con: Jors Dannhauser 3', 8', 26', 28', 47' (5/7); Christopher Micklewood 56', 58', 70', 77', 79' (5/6)	Scoreboard	Pen: Malcolm-Kerr Till (0/1); Cards: Hennie Venter (yellow card) 13' to 23'; Malcolm-Kerr Till (yellow card) 63' to 73'	Referee: Blake Beattie

8 March 2014	Roodepoort	19–17	Bloemfontein Crusaders	Rand Leases Sports Ground, Roodepoort
16:00	Try: Chanley Williams; Jesse Geyer; Pen: Hendrik Gerhardus Oosthuizen	Scoreboard	Try: Griffin Colby; Pen: Deon Taljaard; Brandon Colby	Attendance: 0 Referee: Renier Vermeulen

Bye/s: Welkom Rovers

===== Round two =====
15 March 2014	Bloemfontein Crusaders	29–21	Welkom Rovers	Welkom Rovers Rugby Club, Welkom
16:00	Try: Deon Taljaard 32'; Jonathan Boucher 48'; Isak Job 54'; Daniel Viljoen 73'; Con: Deon Taljaard 32', 55' (2/3); Griffin Colby 74' (1/1); Drop: Isak Job 69' (1/1); Cards: Darren Colby (yellow card) 19' to 29'; Randall Nelson (yellow card) 26' to 35'	Scoreboard	Try: Shaun Nieuwenhuyzen 9', 27'; LC van Tonder 79'; Con: Pieter Strydom (0/1); Shaun Nieuwenhuyzen (0/2); Pen: Pieter Strydom (0/2); Shaun Nieuwenhuyzen 37', 46' (2/5); Drop: Wayne Ludick (0/1); Cards: Nicolaas Pretorius (yellow card) 20' to 30'; Johnnie Fourie (red card) 44'	Referee: Lebohang Raleteng

15 March 2014	Welkom	0–75	Roodepoort	North West Stadium 'B', Welkom
16:00		Scoreboard	Try: Jaun Shaw 2', 33', 57'; Thys de Villiers 6'; Nicky Cronjé 16'; Gerhard Scholtz 37'; Lesego Daniel Malau 60', 80'; Junior Gray 64'; Chanley Williams 68'; Jesse Geyer 74'; Con: Hendrik Gerhardus Oosthuizen 3', 7', 17', 34', 38' (5/5); Chanley Williams 58', 61', 65', 69', 75' (5/6); Cards: Ronald Arthur Goodman (yellow card) 28'	Attendance: 280; Referee: AJ Jacobs

Bye/s: College Rovers

===== Round three =====
22 March 2014	Bloemfontein Crusaders	14–78	College Rovers	Clive Solomon Stadium, Heidedal
16:00	Try: Isak Job 24'; Jonathan Boucher 56'; Con: Deon Taljaard 25', 57' (2/3); Pen: Deon Taljaard (0/1); Cards: Erick van Niekerk (yellow card) 66' to 76'	Scoreboard	Try: Warrick Venter 3'; Kyle Wilkinson 12'; Jean Pretorius 29'; Shannon Rick 37'; Jeandré Small 44'; Dusty Noble 52', 61'; Jared Chiocchetti 54'; Quinton Crocker 58'; Edlyn Serge 67'; Kirk Twine 69'; Warren Randall 77'; Con: Jors Dannhauser 13', 38', 53', 55', 59', 62', 68', 78' (8/11); Dusty Noble 45' (1/1); Cards: Dusty Noble (yellow card) 27' to 38'	Attendance: 1,000; Referee: Jaco Kotze

22 March 2014	Welkom Rovers	31–37	Roodepoort	Welkom Rovers Rugby Club, Welkom
16:30	Try: Pieter Strydom 47'; Robbie Ntlantsana 50'; Shaun Nieuwenhuyzen 61'; Wayne Ludick 74'; Con: Pieter Strydom 48', 51', 62', 75' (4/4); Pen: Pieter Strydom 26' (1/2)	Scoreboard	Try: Jesse Geyer 58'; Jaun Shaw 64', 78'; Con: Chanley Williams 65', 78' (2/3); Pen: Chanley Williams 15', 42', 45', 54', 80' (5/6); Drop: Andre Esterhuizen 30' (1/1)	Referee: Enrico van Rooyen

Bye/s: Welkom

===== Round four =====
29 March 2014	Roodepoort	20–41	College Rovers	Rand Leases Sports Ground, Roodepoort
16:00	Try: André Esterhuizen 66'; Jesse Geyer 73'; Con: Hendrik Gerhardus Oosthuizen 67', 74' (2/2); Pen: Hendrik Gerhardus Oosthuizen 2', 26' (2/3); Drop: Hendrik Gerhardus Oosthuizen (0/2)	Scoreboard	Try: Dusty Noble 17'; Jongi Nokwe 33', 69'; Matthew Phillips 52'; Christopher Micklewood 56'; Kirk Twine 80'; Con: Jors Dannhauser 33', 57', 69' (3/5); Christopher Micklewood 81' (1/1); Pen: Jors Dannhauser 9' (1/1)	Attendance: 500; Referee: Jan Hendrik Venter

29 March 2014	Welkom Rovers	40–16	Welkom	Welkom Rovers Rugby Club, Welkom
17:00	Try: Shaun Nieuwenhuyzen 7', 24'; Stephan Kekana 39'; Frank Mateus 60'; Thembelani Mabomba 64'; LC van Tonder 71'; Con: Pieter Strydom 7', 25', 61', 65', 72' (5/6); Pen: Pieter Strydom (0/1); Drop: Pieter Strydom (0/1); Ryno Venter (0/1)	Scoreboard	Try: Neill Fullagar 27'; Con: Heinrich Barnard 27' (1/1); Pen: Heinrich Barnard (0/3); Malcolm-Kerr Till 55' (1/1); Drop: Heinrich Barnard 3', 51' (2/2)	Attendance: 1,500; Referee: Oregopotse Rametsi

Bye/s: Bloemfontein Crusaders

===== Round five =====
5 April 2014	College Rovers	26–14	Welkom Rovers	KP3, Kings Park, Durban
15:00	Try: Matthew Jones 8'; Kyle Wilkinson 56'; Matthew Phillips 62'; Jongi Nokwe 71'; Con: Jors Dannhauser 9', 63', 71' (3/3)	Scoreboard	Try: Shaun Nieuwenhuyzen 36'; Stephan Kekana 78'; Con: Pieter Strydom 37', 79' (2/2); Cards: Robbie Ntlantsana (yellow card) 39' to 49'	Referee: Archie Sehlako

5 April 2014	Welkom	22–62	Bloemfontein Crusaders	North West Stadium 'B', Welkom
16:00	Try: Christo Boshoff 22'; Quintin Davis 35'; Malcolm-Kerr Till 45'; Con: Malcolm-Kerr Till 23', 36' (2/3); Drop: Heinrich Barnard 57' (1/1)	Scoreboard	Try: Lebohang Tsoeu 5', 12'; Don Manus 15'; Griffin Colby 26'; Daniel Viljoen 30', 58'; Donavan Ball 48'; Jonathan Boucher 65', 80'; Jacques van Rooyen 71'; Con: Deon Taljaard 6' (1/3); Griffin Colby 32', 48', 59', 66', 72' (5/6); Isak Job (0/1)	Attendance: 100; Referee: AJ Jacobs

Bye/s: Roodepoort

=== Pool C ===
==== Log ====
2014 SARU Community Cup Pool C Log
Pos	Team	Pl	W	D	L	PF	PA	PD	TF	TA	TB	LB	Pts
1	Roses United	4	3	1	0	161	109	+52	23	14	4	0	18
2	Centurion	4	2	2	0	162	100	+62	19	13	3	0	15
3	Brakpan	4	2	1	1	141	104	+37	18	12	4	1	15
4	Boksburg	4	1	0	3	121	169	–48	14	20	2	0	6
5	Noordelikes	4	0	0	4	78	181	–103	9	24	0	0	0
* Legend: Pos = Position, Pl = Played, W = Won, D = Drawn, L = Lost, PF = Points for, PA = Points against, PD = Points difference, TF = Tries For, TA = Tries Against, TB = Try bonus points, LB = Losing bonus points, Pts = Log points Roses United and Centurion qualified for the finals. Points breakdown: *4 points for a win *2 points for a draw *1 bonus point for a loss by seven points or less *1 bonus point for scoring four or more tries in a match

==== Fixtures and results ====
===== Round one =====
8 March 2014	Roses United	27–26	Brakpan	Pelican Park, Wellington
16:00		Scoreboard

8 March 2014	Noordelikes	13–42	Boksburg	Noordelikes Rugby Club, Polokwane
17:00	Try: Johan de Beer 29'; Ricardo Varela 80'; Con: Zander Byleveldt (0/2); Pen: Zander Byleveldt 2' (1/1); Cards: Johannes Lodewikus van Niekerk (yellow card) 16' to 26'; Jan Frederik Jacobs (yellow card) 36' to 46'; Cornelius van Geyn (yellow card) 40' to 50'	Scoreboard	Try: Wayne Raymond Havenga 17'; Ashwill Adams 36'; Juan Verster 59'; Karel Gerrit Vermeulen 65'; Ferdinand Petrus Erasmus 77'; Con: Ashley Noel Buchler 18', 37', 66', 78' (4/5); Pen: Ashley Noel Buchler 4', 14', 40' (3/3); Cards: Wikus Coetzer (yellow card) 27' to 37'	Attendance: 300; Referee: T. Correia

Bye/s: Centurion

===== Round two =====
15 March 2014	Boksburg	36–50	Roses United	Prince George Park, Boksburg
16:00	Try: Etienne Taljaard 1'; Calvin Jantjes 25'; Ashwill Adams 34'; Dean Swart 50'; Wynand Johannes Venter 77'; Con: Ashley Noel Buchler 2', 26', 51', 77' (4/5); Pen: Ashley Noel Buchler 11' (1/1); Cards: Jacques van der Walt (yellow card) 39' to 49'; Juan Bester (yellow card) 39' to 49'; Dean Swart (yellow card) 72'	Scoreboard	Try: Tiaan Ramat 28', 60'; Reinart Hubert Ellmann 40'; Brendon April 42', 74'; Denver Fortuin 58' penalty try 72'; Con: Ryan Julies 29', 40', 59', 61', 72', 74' (6/7); Pen: Ryan Julies (0/2); Drop: Ryan Julies 69' (1/1)	Attendance: 150; Referee: Ruaan du Preez

15 March 2014	Centurion	46–22	Noordelikes	Centurion Rugby Club, Centurion
16:00	Try: Rohann Stroh 5'; Ryno Coetzee 15'; Paul Jacobs 28'; Cornelius Pieterse 35'; Sylvester Booysen 48'; Neill Pieterse 78'; Con: Steven Moir 16', 29', 36', 49' (4/5); Stanley Twiname 79' (1/1); Pen: Steven Moir 41' (1/3); Stanley Twiname 80' (1/1); Drop: Cornelius Pieterse (0/1); Cards: Erasmus Jooste (yellow card) 32' to 42'; Xerxes Oosthuizen (yellow card) 74'; Juan_Philip Pike (yellow card) 77'	Scoreboard	Try: Johan de Beer 19'; Theyman Jongbloed 55'; Gert van der Merwe 69'; Con: Zander Byleveldt 20', 56' (2/3); Pen: Zander Byleveldt 26' (1/1)	Attendance: 500; Referee: Wilko Esterhuizen

Bye/s: Brakpan

===== Round three =====
20 March 2014	Brakpan	48–23	Boksburg	Bosman Stadium, Brakpan
18:00	Try: Dean van der Merwe 16'; Langa Damba 38', 42'; Wikus van der Berg 77'; Tobie Strydom 79'; Con: Gido Horn 17', 39', 78', 80' (4/5); Pen: Gido Horn 4', 21', 34', 58', 68' (5/5); Cards: Francois Robbertse (yellow card) 32' to 41'	Scoreboard	Try: Marius Matthee 24'; Ashwill Adams 52'; Con: Ashley Noel Buchler 25', 53' (2/2); Pen: Ashley Noel Buchler 40', 50', 63' (3/3); Cards: Wayne Raymond Havenga (yellow card) 32' to 41'	Referee: Jaco Pretorius

22 March 2014	Roses United	26–26	Centurion	Pelican Park, Wellington
16:00	Try: Kelvin Fikster 24'; Thurlow Marsh 35', 52', 64'; Con: Ryan Julies 35', 52', 64' (3/4); Pen: Lohan Lubbe (0/2); Cards: Keenan Abrahams (yellow card) 28' to 39'	Scoreboard	Try: Christiaan Burger 30', 41'; Con: Steven Moir 30', 41' (2/2); Pen: Stanley Twiname 68', 80' (2/4); Steven Moir 62', 66' (2/2); Cards: Ryno Coetzee (yellow card) 60'	Referee: Daniel Fortuin

Bye/s: Noordelikes

===== Round four =====
29 March 2014	Boksburg	20–58	Centurion	Prince George Park, Boksburg
16:00	Try: Dean Swart 14'; Theo Methodius Rhodes 57'; Con: Ashley Noel Buchler 14', 57' (2/2); Pen: Ashley Noel Buchler 9', 53' (2/3)	Scoreboard	Try: Quentin Horn 23'; Stanley Twiname 48'; Christiaan Burger 51', 60', 79'; Jacques Olivier 69'; Xerxes Oosthuizen 77'; Con: Steven Moir 23', 48', 51', 60', 69', 77', 80' (7/7); Pen: Steven Moir 28', 34', 64' (3/6)	Referee: Pieter Maritz

29 March 2014	Brakpan	35–22	Noordelikes	Bosman Stadium, Brakpan
18:00	Try: Langa Damba 29', 76'; Wikus van der Berg 35', 43', 60'; Con: Hein Cronjé (0/2); Gido Horn 43', 76' (2/3); Pen: Hein Cronjé 13' (1/1); Gido Horn 68' (1/1); Cards: Jacques Nieuwenhuis (yellow card) 71'	Scoreboard	Try: Gert van der Merwe 41'; Con: Zander Byleveldt 42' (1/1); Pen: Zander Byleveldt 16', 31', 38', 47', 63' (5/5); Cards: Gert van der Merwe (yellow card) 6' to 16'; Cornelius van Geyn (yellow card) 34'	Referee: AJ Jacobs

Bye/s: Roses United

===== Round five =====
5 April 2014	Centurion	32–32	Brakpan	Centurion Rugby Club, Centurion
16:00	Try: Sibongile Njomba 15'; Gerhard van der Merwe 23'; Ryno Coetzee 45'; Steven Moir 51'; Con: Steven Moir 16', 24', 52' (3/4); Pen: Steven Moir 9' (1/3); Stanley Twiname 32' (1/4); Drop: Neill Pieterse (0/1); Cards: Xerxes Oosthuizen (yellow card) 11' to 21'	Scoreboard	Try: Langa Damba 5'; Franco Booysen 12'; Tobie Strydom 54'; Thinus Ueckermann 64'; Wikus van der Berg 68'; Con: Gido Horn 6', 13' (2/3); Ryno Hendrikz (0/1); Hein Cronje (0/1); Pen: Gido Horn 35' (1/1); Cards: Francois Robbertse (yellow card) 60' to 70'	Attendance: 1,500; Referee: Ricus van der Hoven

5 April 2014	Noordelikes	21–58	Roses United	Noordelikes Rugby Club, Polokwane
16:30	Try: Mynhardt Smith 10', 50'; Theyman Jongbloed 78'; Con: Zander Byleveldt 11', 50', 79' (3/3); Pen: Zander Byleveldt (0/2); Cards: Malope Masemola (yellow card) 40' to 50'	Scoreboard	Try: Gershwin Moses 27', 34'; Brendon April 36', 68'; Tiaan Ramat 70'; Adriaan Jacobs 74', 80'; Con: Ryan Julies 28', 37', 69', 71', 75', 80' (6/6); Brendon April 35' (1/1); Pen: Ryan Julies 2', 12', 54' (3/3); Cards: Reinart Hubert Ellmann (yellow card) 26' to 36'; Tiaan Ramat (yellow card) 47' to 57'	Attendance: 200; Referee: Richard Schwulst

Bye/s: Boksburg

=== Pool D ===
==== Log ====
2014 SARU Community Cup Pool D Log
Pos	Team	Pl	W	D	L	PF	PA	PD	TF	TA	TB	LB	Pts
1	Hamiltons	4	4	0	0	198	61	+137	28	8	4	0	20
2	Rustenburg Impala	4	3	0	1	148	84	+64	21	9	4	0	16
3	Sishen	4	2	0	2	113	116	–3	14	16	2	0	10
4	Witbank Ferros	4	1	0	3	91	162	–71	11	24	1	1	6
5	Wesbank	4	0	0	4	49	176	–127	8	25	1	0	1
* Legend: Pos = Position, Pl = Played, W = Won, D = Drawn, L = Lost, PF = Points for, PA = Points against, PD = Points difference, TF = Tries For, TA = Tries Against, TB = Try bonus points, LB = Losing bonus points, Pts = Log points Hamiltons and Rustenburg Impala qualified for the finals. Points breakdown: *4 points for a win *2 points for a draw *1 bonus point for a loss by seven points or less *1 bonus point for scoring four or more tries in a match

==== Fixtures and results ====
===== Round one =====
8 March 2014	Witbank Ferros	33–20	Wesbank	Puma Stadium, Witbank
15:30	Try: Tommie Collen 18'; Pule Sibiya 48', 72'; Con: Dewald Pieters 19', 48', 72' (3/3); Pen: Dewald Pieters 29', 51', 52', 69' (4/5); Cards: Izan Green (yellow card) 64' to 74'	Scoreboard	Try: André Coetzee 5'; Nadius Solomons 26'; Salmon Coetzee 36'; Dashton Wellman 76'; Con: Theodore Marinus (0/1); Rodville Bradley Jonkers (0/2); Nevin Edas (0/1); Pen: Theodore Marinus (0/1); Rodville Bradley Jonkers (0/1); Drop: Theodore Marinus (0/1); Cards: Ghriswin Swarts (yellow card) 68' to 78'	Referee: Ricus van der Hoven

8 March 2014	Rustenburg Impala	29–17	Sishen	Rustenburg Impala Rugby Club, Rustenburg
16:00	Try: Leon Andries du Plessis 24'; Berty Visser 27', 46'; Victor Joubert 32'; Con: Naas Olivier 25', 28', 47' (3/4); Pen: Naas Olivier 3' (1/2); Cards: Louis van der Byl Hollamby (yellow card) 20' to 30'	Scoreboard	Try: Stevie Meyer 40', 80'; Con: Andries Jacobus Bloem 40' (1/1); Brendon Coetzer 81' (1/1); Pen: Andries Jacobus Bloem 2' (1/2); Cards: Arnold Coetzee (yellow card) 17' to 28'; Leonard Poolman (yellow card) 32' to 42'	Attendance: 400; Referee: Stephan Geldenhuys

Bye/s: Hamiltons

===== Round two =====
15 March 2014	Witbank Ferros	17–41	Rustenburg Impala	Puma Stadium, Witbank
15:30	Try: Jean Botha 2'; Willie van der Merwe 38'; Con: Dewald Pieters 3', 38' (2/2); Pen: Dewald Pieters 32' (1/4); Drop: Jan Adriaan van der Merwe (0/1)	Scoreboard	Try: Justin Wheeler 24', 65'; Morné Peter Jooste 39'; Earl Cassidy Lewis 62'; Leon Andries du Plessis 72'; Con: Naas Olivier 25', 39', 62', 65', 72' (5/5); Pen: Naas Olivier 28', 45' (2/2); Cards: Justin St Jerry (yellow card) 31' to 41'	Referee: Terence Westcott

15 March 2014	Hamiltons	48–9	Sishen	Stephan Oval, Green Point, Cape Town
16:00	Try: JG Giliomee 8'; Pierre Cronjé 12', 42'; Pieter Stefan de Villiers 51'; Gregory John van Jaarsveld 61'; Iewan Bartels 69'; Kudu Botha 79'; Con: Shane Vallender 9', 12', 42', 61', 70' (5/7); Pen: Shane Vallender 31' (1/1)	Scoreboard	Pen: Andries Jacobus Bloem 1', 5', 22' (3/5); Drop: Brendon Coetzer (0/1)	Referee: Daniel Fortuin

Bye/s: Wesbank

===== Round three =====
22 March 2014	Sishen	35–29	Witbank Ferros	Sivos Rugby Stadium, Kathu
16:00	Try: Andries Jacobus Bloem 11'; Aubrene Tities 18'; Pieter van Aarde 27'; Jamie Zwiegelaar 48'; Ruan Grobler 58'; Con: Andries Jacobus Bloem 12', 49' (2/4); Pen: Andries Jacobus Bloem 38' (1/3); Drop: Tiaan le Roux 79' (1/1)	Scoreboard	Try: MC Botes 22', 77'; Tommie Collen 29'; Nkululeko Henson Ngozo 80'; Con: Dewald Pieters 30', 78' (2/3); Jan Adriaan van der Merwe 81' (1/1); Pen: Dewald Pieters 9' (1/1); Jan Adriaan van der Merwe (0/1)	Referee: Nico Schmahl

22 March 2014	Wesbank	12–41	Hamiltons	Wesbank Sports Grounds, Malmesbury
16:00	Try: penalty try 48'; Ghriswin Swarts 64'; Con: Rodville Bradley Jonkers (0/1); Dashton Wellman 49' (1/1); Theodore Marinus (0/1); Pen: Rodville Bradley Jonkers (0/2)	Scoreboard	Try: Jody David Burch 6'; Iewan Bartels 39'; Craig Lance Pheiffer 43'; Niel Cleghorn 54'; Tapiwa Tsomondo 62', 67'; Abraham Winter 79'; Con: Shane Vallender 7' (1/3); Johannes Jacobus van Zyl 69', 80' (2/3); Pen: Shane Vallender (0/1); Cards: Tian Fick (yellow card) 15' to 25'; Pierre Cronjé (yellow card) 49' to 59'	Referee: Cwengile Jadezweni

Bye/s: Rustenburg Impala

===== Round four =====
29 March 2014	Hamiltons	66–12	Witbank Ferros	Stephan Oval, Green Point, Cape Town
16:00	Try: Jan Abraham du Plessis 2', 6'; Niel Cleghorn 10'; Abraham Winter 17'; Jody David Burch 29', 33'; Iewan Bartels 35'; Tapiwa Tsomondo 58'; Johannes Jacobus van Zyl 62'; Charles Purdon 76'; Con: Shane Vallender 3', 6', 11', 29', 36', 59', 63', 77' (8/10)	Scoreboard	Try: Nkululeko Henson Ngozo 40'; Jean Botha 48'; Con: Dewald Pieters 40' (1/2)	Referee: Daniel Fortuin

29 March 2014	Wesbank	7–50	Rustenburg Impala	Wesbank Sports Grounds, Malmesbury
16:00	Try: Anton Stander 28'; Con: Rodville Bradley Jonkers 29' (1/1); Pen: Rodville Bradley Jonkers (0/1); Cards: Petro Louw (yellow card) 62' to 72'	Scoreboard	Try: Linton Terblanche 1'; Leon Andries du Plessis 9'; Zander de Kock 13'; Willem Kok 17', 64'; Victor Joubert 23'; Justin St Jerry 47'; Jermaine Anshon Apollis 68'; Con: Naas Olivier 2', 10', 14', 18' (4/6); Wilco de Wet 65' (1/2); Cards: Leon Andries du Plessis (yellow card) 62' to 72'; Hendrik Huyser (yellow card) 71'; Jermaine Anshon Apollis (yellow card) 79'	Attendance: 1,800; Referee: Francois Pretorius

Bye/s: Sishen

===== Round five =====
5 April 2014	Rustenburg Impala	28–43	Hamiltons	Rustenburg Impala Rugby Club, Rustenburg
16:00	Try: Earl Lewis 2', 13', 30'; Michael Nienaber 65'; Con: Naas Olivier (0/3); Wilco de Wet 31' (1/1); Pen: Naas Olivier (0/1); Willem Kok 19', 52' (2/2); Wilco de Wet (0/3); Cards: Michael Nienaber (yellow card) 75'	Scoreboard	Try: Jan Abraham du Plessis 24'; Jody David Burch 60'; Terry Jacobs 62'; Johannes Jacobus van Zyl 70'; Con: Shane Vallender 25', 60', 63', 70' (4/4); Pen: Shane Vallender 6', 37', 43', 73' (4/4); Drop: Shane Vallender 75' (1/1); Cards: Gareth Rowe (yellow card) 50' to 60'; Tapiwa Tsomondo (yellow card) 55' to 65'	Referee: Pro Legoete

5 April 2014	Sishen	52–10	Wesbank	Sivos Rugby Stadium, Kathu
16:00	Try: Anthony de Villiers 5' penalty try 11'; Jamie Zwiegelaar 21'; Arnold Coetzee 37'; Leonard Poolman 42'; Tiaan le Roux 55', 71'; Attie du Plessis 63'; Con: Tiaan le Roux 6', 12', 22', 38', 43', 72' (6/8); Cards: Khangelani Zila Mbekela (yellow card) 34' to 45'; Anthony de Villiers (yellow card) 66' to 76'	Scoreboard	Try: Johannes Slabber 77'; Con: Magnum Nelson 78' (1/1); Pen: Rodville Bradley Jonkers 18' (1/1); Cards: Daryl Losper (yellow card) 12' to 22'; Petro Louw (yellow card) 66' to 76'; Jeremiah Titus (yellow card) 66' to 76'	Attendance: 600; Referee: Nico Schmahl

Bye/s: Witbank Ferros

== Finals ==
The finals were played at Outeniqua Park, George from 17 to 21 April 2014.

=== Quarter-finals ===
The winning teams qualified to the Cup semi-finals, while the losing teams qualified to the Bowl semi-finals.

17 April 2014	Despatch	20–26	Roodepoort	Outeniqua Park, George
11:15	Try: Monty Dumond 65'; Virgil Russel 72'; Con: Monty Dumond 66', 72' (2/2); Pen: Monty Dumond 14', 40' (2/2); Cards: Ashley Viviers (yellow card) 44' to 54'	Scoreboard	Try: Mauritz van Rooyen 5'; Lesego Daniel Malau 26'; Jaun Shaw 31'; Con: Hendrik Gerhardus Oosthuizen 6' (1/3); Pen: Hendrik Gerhardus Oosthuizen 20', 56', 76' (3/3); Chanley Williams (0/2); Cards: Andre Esterhuizen (yellow card) 44' to 54'; Byron Godfrey (yellow card) 68' to 79'	Referee: Juan Sylvestre

17 April 2014	College Rovers	36–13	Old Selbornians	Outeniqua Park, George
13:30	Try: Paul Bester 13'; Jean Pretorius 20', 48', 54'; Shannon Rick 65'; Con: Jors Dannhauser 14', 21', 55', 66' (4/5); Pen: Jeandré Small 38' (1/1); Cards: Jors Dannhauser (yellow card) 30' to 40'	Scoreboard	Try: Dylan Pieterse 60'; Marc Hammond 79'; Con: Warren Rielly (0/2); Pen: Craig Shone 16' (1/3); Warren Rielly (0/1); Curtis Kleinhans (0/1); Cards: Peter Smith (yellow card) 49' to 59'	Referee: Federico Anselmi

17 April 2014	Roses United	13–66	Rustenburg Impala	Outeniqua Park, George
15:45	Try: Tiaan Ramat 66'; Con: Ryan Julies 67' (1/1); Pen: Ryan Julies 10' (1/1); Drop: Ryan Julies 72' (1/1)	Scoreboard	Try: Victor Joubert 3'; Willem Kok 8'; Earl Lewis 13', 64'; Dumisani Matyeshana 19'; Michael Nienaber 29'; Wendal Wehr 45'; Justin Wheeler 80'; Con: Naas Olivier 9', 14', 20', 30', 46' (5/6); Earl Lewis 65' (1/1); Wilco de Wet 80' (1/1); Pen: Naas Olivier 39', 61' (2/3); Wilco de Wet 70', 75' (2/2); Cards: Michael Nienaber (yellow card) 66' to 76'	Referee: Cwengile Jadezweni

17 April 2014	Hamiltons	40–10	Centurion	Outeniqua Park, George
18:00	Try: Jan Abraham du Plessis 37', 70'; Richard Lawson 52'; Terry Jacobs 71'; Johannes Jacobus van Zyl 79'; Con: Shane Vallender 38', 53', 80' (3/5); Pen: Shane Vallender 7', 25', 64' (3/4)	Scoreboard	Try: Bertus Coetzee 75'; Con: Steven Moir 76' (1/1); Pen: Steven Moir 28' (1/1)	Referee: Tahla Ntshakaza

=== Cup semi-finals ===
The winning teams qualify to the Cup final, while the losing teams qualify to the Plate final.

19 April 2014	College Rovers	13–32	Rustenburg Impala	Outeniqua Park, George
17:00	Try: Quinton Crocker 64'; Con: Jors Dannhauser 65' (1/1); Pen: Jors Dannhauser 16', 40' (2/2)	Scoreboard	Try: Michael Nienaber 20', 36'; Naas Olivier 31'; Earl Lewis 80'; Con: Naas Olivier 21', 37' (2/3); Wilco de Wet 80' (1/1); Pen: Naas Olivier (0/3); Wilco de Wet 55' (1/2); Drop: Earl Cassidy Lewis (0/1); Willem Kok 43' (1/1); Naas Olivier (0/1)

19 April 2014	Roodepoort	20–18	Hamiltons	Outeniqua Park, George
19:15	Try: Gerhard Scholtz 22'; Jesse Geyer 70'; Con: Hendrik Gerhardus Oosthuizen 23', 71' (2/2); Pen: Hendrik Gerhardus Oosthuizen 3', 30' (2/4); Chanley Williams (0/1); Cards: Thys de Villiers (yellow card) 15' to 25'	Scoreboard	Pen: Shane Vallender 5', 16', 28', 49', 56', 60' (6/8); Cards: JG Giliomee (yellow card) 39' to 49'

=== Bowl semi-finals ===
The winning teams qualify to the Bowl final, while the losing teams qualify to the Shield final.

19 April 2014	Roses United	39–31	Old Selbornians	Outeniqua Park, George
12:30	Try: Reinart Hubert Ellmann 4'; Thurlow Marsh 7'; Kelvin Fikster 9', 26' penalty try 18'; Brendon April 40'; Con: Ryan Julies 8', 18', 27' (3/6); Pen: Ryan Julies 82' (1/2)	Scoreboard	Try: Curtis Kleinhans 30', 57'; Jack van Coller 38'; Marc Hammond 67'; Con: Craig Shone 31', 39', 58', 68' (4/4); Pen: Curtis Kleinhans 23' (1/1); Cards: Craig Shone (yellow card) 18' to 28'; Duran Alberts (red card) 28'

19 April 2014	Despatch	23–21	Centurion	Outeniqua Park, George
14:45	Try: Trichardt van Tonder 14'; Bobby Dyer 33'; Billy Mintoor 70'; Con: Monty Dumond 34' (1/3); Pen: Monty Dumond 40', 60' (2/3); Cards: Trichardt van Tonder (yellow card) 47' to 57'	Scoreboard	Try: Yves Bashiya 47'; Paul Jacobs 67'; Christiaan Burger 75'; Con: Steven Moir 48', 68', 76' (3/3); Pen: Steven Moir (0/2)

=== Cup final ===
21 April 2014	Rustenburg Impala	13–11	Roodepoort	Outeniqua Park, George
16:00	Try: Leon Andries du Plessis 25'; Con: Naas Olivier 26' (1/1); Pen: Naas Olivier 5', 40' (2/2); Wilco de Wet (0/3)	Scoreboard	Try: Jaun Shaw 31'; Con: Hendrik Gerhardus Oosthuizen (0/1); Pen: Hendrik Gerhardus Oosthuizen 15', 56' (2/2); Chanley Williams (0/1); Drop: Hendrik Gerhardus Oosthuizen (0/1)

=== Plate final ===
21 April 2014	College Rovers	18–27	Hamiltons	Outeniqua Park, George
13:45	Try: Warrick Venter 23'; Quinton Crocker 60'; Con: Christopher Micklewood 61' (1/2); Pen: Christopher Micklewood 21', 65' (2/2); Cards: Njabulo Mkize (yellow card) 35' to 45'	Scoreboard	Try: Iewan Bartels 15'; Kudu Botha 46'; Terry Jacobs 51'; Con: Shane Vallender 16' (1/1); Johannes Jacobus van Zyl 47', 52' (2/2); Pen: Shane Vallender (0/2); Johannes Jacobus van Zyl 71', 78' (2/2); Cards: JG Giliomee (yellow card) 10' to 21'

=== Bowl final ===
21 April 2014	Despatch	57–21	Roses United	Outeniqua Park, George
11:30	Try: Stephan Deyzel 9'; Monty Dumond 13'; Elroy Ligman 19'; Billy Mintoor 22', 57', 70'; Trichardt van Tonder 37'; Lesley Luiters 46'; Con: Monty Dumond 10', 14', 23', 38', 47', 58', 71' (7/8); Pen: Monty Dumond 40' (1/1); Cards: Trichardt van Tonder (yellow card) 50' to 60'	Scoreboard	Try: Reinart Hubert Ellmann 17'; Brendon April 54'; Gareth Cilliers 73'; Con: Lohan Lubbe 18' (1/1); Brendon April 54' (1/1); Ryan Julies 74' (1/1); Cards: Percival Godfrey Williams (red card) 64'

=== Shield final ===
21 April 2014	Old Selbornians	14–42	Centurion	Outeniqua Park, George
09:15	Try: Craig Green 12'; Con: Craig Shone (0/1); Pen: Craig Shone 6', 32' (2/2); Warren Rielly 53' (1/1); Cards: Michael Amui (yellow card) 34' to 44'	Scoreboard	Try: Stanley Twiname 37', 42', 53'; Yves Bashiya 56'; Gerhard van der Merwe 60'; Jacques Olivier 75'; Con: Steven Moir 43', 54', 57' (3/6); Pen: Steven Moir 23', 35' (2/2)
