= Kevin Stevens (rugby union) =

South African rugby union player

- Full name: Kevin Bruce Stevens
- Born: 30 January 1987 (age 39) Virginia, South Africa
- Height: 1.86 m (6 ft 1 in)
- Weight: 114 kg (17 st 13 lb; 251 lb)
- School: Grey College, Bloemfontein
- University: University of the Free State

Rugby union career
- Position: Prop
- Current team: Free State Cheetahs
Youth career
- 2005–2008: Free State Cheetahs
Amateur team(s)
Years	Team	Apps	(Points)
2012	UFS Shimlas	2	(0)
Senior career
Years	Team	Apps	(Points)
2007–2009	Free State Cheetahs	6	(0)
2009–2013	Griffons	72	(15)
2011	→ Griquas	1	(0)
2014	Free State Cheetahs	5	(0)
2014	→ Griffons	1	(0)
2014	Cheetahs	1	(0)
2014–2017	Free State XV	12	(5)
2018	Free State Cheetahs	4	(0)
2023–	Free State Cheetahs		
- Correct as of 22 September 2018

Kevin Bruce Stevens (born 30 January 1987) is a South African professional rugby union player who last played for the Free State Cheetahs in the Currie Cup. His regular position is loosehead prop.

== Career ==
=== Youth ===
After representing the Free State Cheetahs at the 2005 Under-18 Craven Week competition, he progressed through the different youth structures at the team, playing for the Free State U19 side in 2006 and for the Free State U21 side in 2007 and 2008.

=== Free State Cheetahs ===
Stevens first appeared for the senior side when he played in a compulsory friendly between the Pumas and the Free State Cheetahs prior to the 2007 Currie Cup Premier Division. He was named in the squad for the 2008 Vodacom Cup, but failed to make an appearance. His first senior appearance in a competitive first class match came during the 2009 Vodacom Cup competition, when he started their match against the Border Bulldogs, one of five appearances in that competition.

=== Griffons ===
Stevens failed to break into the Currie Cup squad at the Free State Cheetahs and decided to join their near-neighbours the Griffons prior to the 2009 Currie Cup First Division season. He remained in Welkom for the next four years, playing regularly in the Vodacom Cup and Currie Cup competitions, making 72 appearances for the side. He helped the Griffons reach the semi-finals of the First Division for four years in a row between 2009 and 2012, although they never won it or appeared in the promotion play-off matches.

In 2012, he also made two appearances for Varsity Cup side UFS Shimlas.

=== Griquas ===
In 2011, Stevens also played in one match on loan to the Griquas, his first match in the Premier Division of the Currie Cup. He played off the bench just after the hour mark against former side the Free State Cheetahs and helped his side to a 23–20 victory in Kimberley.

=== Return to Free State Cheetahs ===
Despite announcing his intention to leave the Griffons at the end of 2013 to a career outside of rugby, he was subsequently included in the Free State XV side that played in the 2014 Vodacom Cup competition. He started in all their matches during the season, also scoring one try against Western Province in Cape Town.
