= Matthew Taljard =

South African rugby union player

- Full name: Matthew Taljard
- Born: 8 September 1985 (age 41) East London, South Africa
- Height: 1.75 m (5 ft 9 in)
- Weight: 101 kg (15 st 13 lb; 223 lb)
- School: Hudson Park High School
- University: University of Cape Town
- Notable relative: Jeff Taljard

Rugby union career
- Position: Hooker
- Current team: Border Bulldogs
Senior career
Years	Team	Apps	(Points)
2008–2013	Border Bulldogs	67	(40)
2014–present	Farul Constanţa	13	(0)
- Correct as of 11 June 2014

Matthew Taljard (born 8 September 1985) is a South African rugby union player, currently playing with Romania SuperLiga side Farul Constanţa. His regular position is hooker.

== Career ==
He made his debut for the Border Bulldogs in the 2008 Currie Cup First Division season and has represented them until 2013 in the Currie Cup and Vodacom Cup competitions.

He joined Romanian SuperLiga side Farul Constanţa in 2013.

== Personal ==
He's the older brother of rugby player Jeff Taljard.
