= Jeff Taljard =

South African rugby union player

- Full name: Jeffrey John Taljard
- Born: 22 April 1987 (age 39) East London, South Africa
- Height: 1.81 m (5 ft 11 1/2 in)
- Weight: 90 kg (14 st 2 lb; 198 lb)
- School: Hudson Park High School
- Notable relative: Matthew Taljard

Rugby union career
- Position: Centre
- Current team: Border Bulldogs
Youth career
- 2005–2008: Border Bulldogs
Amateur team(s)
Years	Team	Apps	(Points)
2011	NMMU Madibaz	6	(5)
Senior career
Years	Team	Apps	(Points)
2008	East Cape XV	2	(0)
2008–2010	Border Bulldogs	33	(160)
2011–2013	SWD Eagles	51	(121)
2014	Border Bulldogs	4	(36)
2014–present	CSM Olimpia București	4	(20)
- Correct as of 18 September 2014

Jeffrey John Taljard (born 22 April 1987) is a South African rugby union player, currently playing with Romanian SuperLiga side CSM Olimpia București. His regular position is centre.

== Career ==
He started playing for the Border Bulldogs at the 2005 Under–18 Academy Week and then represented them at Under–19 level in 2006 and at Under–21 level in 2007 and 2008.

He made his first class debut for an East Cape XV (a combination of Border Bulldogs and Mighty Elephants players) in compulsory friendlies prior to the 2008 Currie Cup First Division season. He immediately became a regular for them over the next three seasons.

In 2011, he moved to the SWD Eagles, also playing regularly for the first team.

Taljard also played for the NMMU Madibaz in the 2011 Varsity Cup.

He joined Romanian SuperLiga side CSM Olimpia București in 2014.

== Personal ==
He's the younger brother of rugby player Matthew Taljard.
