= Dusty Noble =

South African rugby union player

- Full name: Dusty Clint Noble
- Born: 30 April 1984 (age 42) Stellenbosch, South Africa
- Height: 1.84 m (6 ft 1/2 in)
- Weight: 90 kg (14 st 2 lb; 198 lb)
- School: Generaal Hertzog; Cloetesville S.S.S (Stellenbosch)
- Notable relative(s): Howard Noble (brother) / JP Pietersen (cousin)

Rugby union career
- Position: Wing
- Current team: College Rovers
Youth career
- 2002: Pumas
- 2003–2004: Leopards
- 2005: Sharks
Amateur team(s)
Years	Team	Apps	(Points)
2014–present	College Rovers	10	(27)
Senior career
Years	Team	Apps	(Points)
2005–2007	Sharks (Currie Cup)	21	(45)
2006–2007	Sharks	3	(0)
2008–2010	Lions	16	(5)
2008–2011	Golden Lions	35	(55)
2011–2013	Griquas	12	(15)
2012	Cheetahs	1	(0)
- Correct as of 7 April 2015
International career
Years	Team	Apps	(Points)
2006–2007	South Africa Sevens		
- Correct as of 14 January 2014

Dusty Noble (born 30 April 1984) is a former South African rugby union footballer. His regular playing position is Wing. He represented the Cheetahs in Super Rugby and Griquas in the Currie Cup. He has previously played for the Sharks and the Golden Lions.

He left Griquas after the 2013 and joined Durban-based club side College Rovers before the 2014 SARU Community Cup.
