= Pieter Myburgh =

Namibian rugby union player

- Born: Pieter Abraham Myburgh; 10 January 1986 (age 40) Windhoek, Namibia
- Height: 1.87 m (6 ft 1 1/2 in)
- Weight: 103 kg (16 st 3 lb; 227 lb)
- School: Paul Roos Gymnasium

Rugby union career
- Position: Flanker
Senior career
Years	Team	Apps	(Points)
2007-2008	Gran Parma	6	(0)
2009-2010	Provence Rugby	21	(0)
2010-2011	CA Lannemezan	22	(5)
2011-2013	Stade Rodez Aveyron	22	(0)
Provincial / State sides
Years	Team	Apps	(Points)
2005–2007	Western Province	29	(15)
2008-2009	Free State Cheetahs	4	(5)
- Correct as of 11 February 2010
Super Rugby
Years	Team	Apps	(Points)
2008–2009	Stormers	5	(0)
- Correct as of 11 February 2010

Pieter Myburgh (born 10 January 1986) is a Namibian rugby union footballer.
