= Justin Downey =

South African rugby union player

- Born: 11 November 1986 (age 40) Johannesburg, South Africa
- Height: 1.91 m (6 ft 3 in)
- Weight: 105 kg (16 st 7 lb; 231 lb)
- School: Northwood High

Rugby union career
- Position(s): Flanker, Number 8
Youth career
- 2002–2007: Sharks
Senior career
| Years | Team | Apps | (Points) |
| 2008–2010 2013–2014 | Sharks (Currie Cup) | 31 | (20) |
| 2009 | Sharks | 0 | (0) |
| 2010–2013 | Griquas | 48 | (20) |
| 2012 | Cheetahs | 12 | (0) |
| 2014–2016 | Suntory Sungoliath | 17 | (10) |
| 2016–2022 | Tokyo Gas | 25 | (235) |
| 2022–2024 | Mie Honda Heat | 5 | (5) |
- Correct as of 17 May 2016

Justin Downey (born 11 November 1986) is a South African rugby union footballer for Japanese Top East League side Tokyo Gas. His regular playing position is flanker.

== Career ==
Downey started his career at the Sharks, making his debut for their Vodacom Cup side, the Natal Wildebeest in the 2008 Vodacom Cup competition. He was included in the Sharks squad for the 2009 Super 14 season and even named on the bench for their match against the Force in Perth, but failed to make an appearance.

Lack of game time saw him move to the Griquas in 2010, where he spent the next three years and made close to fifty appearances. During this spell, he also represented the Cheetahs during the 2012 Super Rugby season.

Downey returned to the Sharks prior to the 2013 Currie Cup Premier Division.

In 2014, Downey signed a contract with Suntory Sungoliath.
