= Norman Nelson =

South African rugby union player

- Full name: Norman Tsimba Nelson
- Born: 10 August 1983 (age 43) Patensie, Eastern Cape
- Height: 1.68 m (5 ft 6 in)
- Weight: 85 kg (187 lb; 13 st 5 lb)
- School: Patensie High School

Rugby union career
- Position: Wing
- Current team: Griffons
Youth career
- 2002–2003: Mighty Elephants
Senior career
Years	Team	Apps	(Points)
2006–2008	Mighty Elephants	47	(150)
2008	East Cape XV	1	(0)
2009–2010	SWD Eagles	20	(77)
2010–2013	Eastern Province Kings	45	(130)
2013–present	Griffons	42	(90)
- Correct as of 23 July 2016
International career
Years	Team	Apps	(Points)
2007	South Africa Sevens		
2012	South African Barbarians (South)	1	(5)
- Correct as of 10 April 2013

Norman Tsimba Nelson (born 10 August 1983) is a South African rugby union player, currently playing with the Griffons.

== Career ==
=== Mighty Elephants / Eastern Province Kings ===
He played for the Mighty Elephants between 2006 and 2008, also representing the South African sevens rugby team in 2007.

In 2009, he moved to the SWD Eagles, but returned to play for the Eastern Province Kings in the 2010 Currie Cup First Division, where he finished joint top try scorer. He was named in the Southern Kings wider training squad for the 2013 Super Rugby season, but was subsequently released to the Vodacom Cup squad.

=== Griffons ===
He joined Welkom-based side Griffons in 2013. He was a key member of their 2014 Currie Cup First Division-winning side. He played in the final and score a try shortly after half-time to help the Griffons win the match 23–21 to win their first trophy for six years.
