= Michael Bondesio =

South African rugby union player

- Born: 10 March 1985 (age 41) Middelburg, South Africa
- Height: 1.76 m (5 ft 9 1/2 in)
- Weight: 84 kg (13 st 3 lb; 185 lb)
- School: Hoërskool Lichtenburg, Lichtenburg

Rugby union career
- Position: Scrumhalf
Youth career
- 2006: Leopards
Senior career
| Years | Team | Apps | (Points) |
| 2007–2010 | Leopards | 52 | (65) |
| 2011–2014 | Golden Lions | 42 | (20) |
| 2011–2012 | Lions | 7 | (5) |
| 2007–2014 | Total | 101 | (90) |
- Correct as of 25 November 2014
International career
| Years | Team | Apps | (Points) |
| 2009 | Highveld XV | 0 | (0) |
- Correct as of 25 November 2014
Coaching career
- Years: Team
- 2015–present: Pirates (assistant)

Michael Bondesio (born 10 March 1985) is a former South African rugby union footballer. His regular playing position was scrum-half.

Between 2007 and 2010, he played for Potchefstroom side the Leopards, making 52 appearances and scoring 13 tries. In 2011, he moved to Johannesburg, where he played domestic rugby for the Golden Lions, scoring four tries in 42 appearances between 2011 and 2014. He also made seven appearances for the Lions during the 2012 Super Rugby season, scoring one try against local rivals the Bulls.

A persistent leg injury led to long lay-offs for Bondesio and eventually his retirement at the end of the 2014 season.

Bondesio is a qualified teacher and started teaching at Hoërskool Lichtenburg at the start of 2015. He was also appointed as the assistant coach of club side Pirates.
