= Johan Wessels =

South African rugby union player

- Full name: Petrus Johannes Wessels
- Born: 29 November 1988 (age 37) Vereeniging, South Africa
- Height: 1.85 m (6 ft 1 in)
- Weight: 100 kg (15 st 10 lb; 220 lb)
- School: Die Afrikaanse Hoërskool Kroonstad
- University: University of the Free State, Bloemfontein

Rugby union career
- Position: Openside Flanker
Senior career
Years	Team	Apps	(Points)
2009–2012	Free State Cheetahs	41	(20)
2010	→ Griffons	8	(0)
2011	Cheetahs	4	(0)
2012–2014	La Rochelle	38	(5)
2014	Leopards	3	(0)
2015	Free State Cheetahs	3	(0)
2015	Griquas	3	(0)
- Correct as of 12 October 2015

Petrus Johannes Wessels (born 29 November 1988) is a South African rugby union footballer. His regular playing position is openside flanker. He most recently represented Griquas, having previously played for the Leopards and the Free State Cheetahs in the Currie Cup and Vodacom Cup competitions, as well as making four appearances for the Cheetahs in Super Rugby. He also played in the French Rugby Pro D2 for two seasons for La Rochelle.
