= Steven Moir =

South African rugby union player

- Full name: Steven Andrew Moir
- Born: 16 August 1991 (age 35) Johannesburg, South Africa
- Height: 1.78 m (5 ft 10 in)
- Weight: 88 kg (194 lb; 13 st 12 lb)
- School: Pretoria Boys High School
- University: University of South Africa

Rugby union career
- Position: Fly-half
- Current team: UP Tuks
Senior career
| Years | Team | Apps | (Points) |
| 2016 | Griquas | 3 | (3) |
- Correct as of 4 September 2018

Steven Andrew Moir (born 16 August 1991) is a South African rugby union player for UP Tuks that played three first class matches for Griquas in 2016; two in the Currie Cup Qualifiers and one in the Currie Cup Premier Division. His regular position is fly-half.
