= Francois Brummer =

South African rugby union player

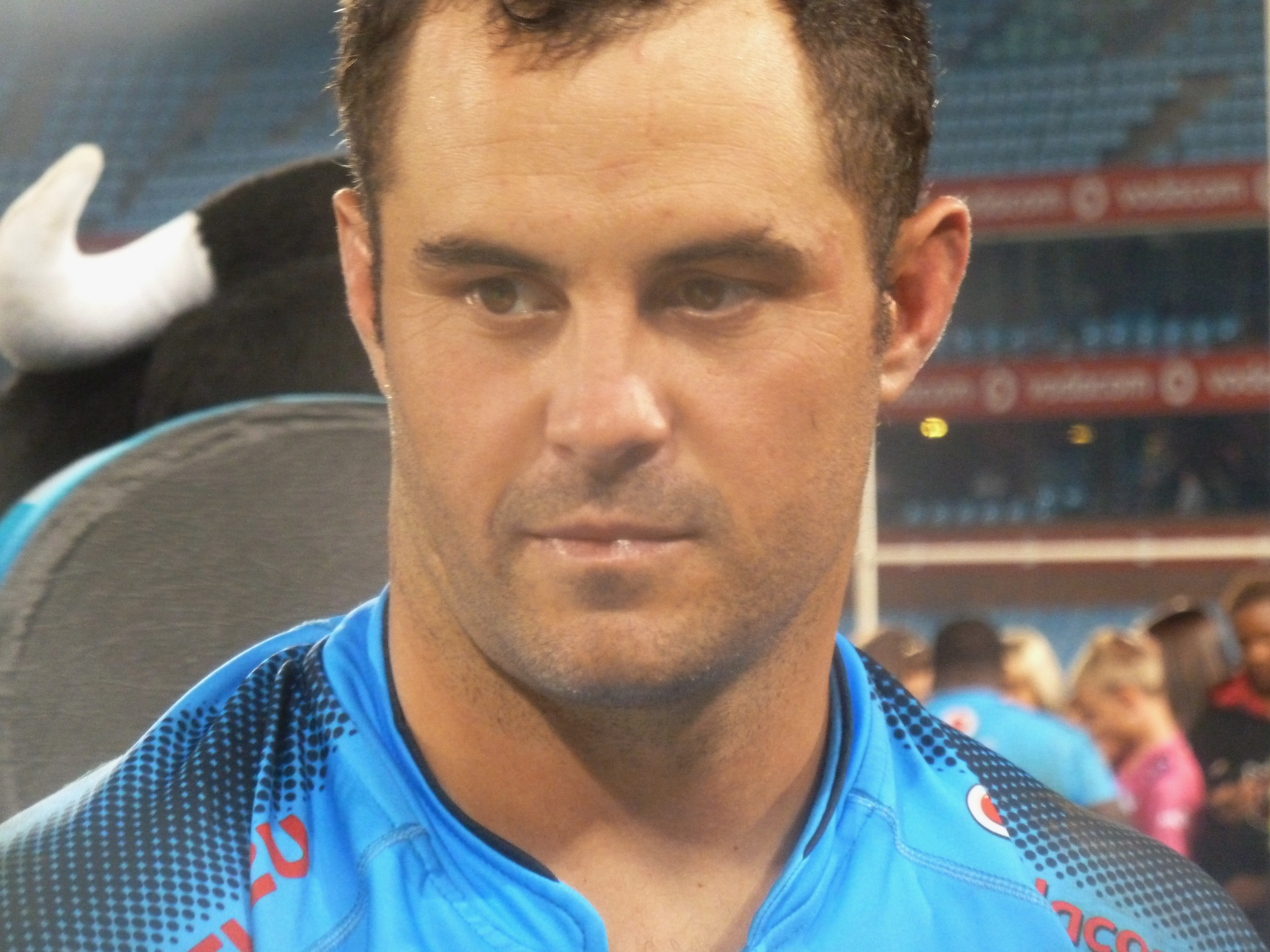
- Born: 17 May 1989 (age 37) Pretoria, South Africa
- Height: 1.83 m (6 ft 0 in)
- Weight: 91 kg (14 st 5 lb; 201 lb)
- School: Hoërskool Waterkloof

Rugby union career
- Position: Fly-half
- Current team: Zebre
Youth career
- 2005–2010: Blue Bulls
Senior career
Years	Team	Apps	(Points)
2008–2011	Blue Bulls	49	(480)
2010–2011	Bulls	5	(2)
2012–2015	Griquas	72	(262)
2013–2015	Cheetahs	4	(17)
2016–2018	Bulls	18	(123)
2016	Pumas	7	(46)
2017–2018	Toyota Industries Shuttles	10	(38)
2018	Blue Bulls XV	4	(4)
2018–2020	Zebre	25	(33)
- Correct as of 21 Feb 2020
International career
Years	Team	Apps	(Points)
2007	South Africa Under-19		
2008–2009	South Africa Under-20	9	(105)
2016	South Africa 'A'	2	(15)
- Correct as of 13 Apr 2018

Francois Brummer (born 17 May 1989) is a South African rugby union player for Zebre in the Pro14. His regular playing position is fly-half, although he has played fullback on occasion.

== Career ==
=== Bulls / Blue Bulls ===
Brummer came through the youth ranks at the Blue Bulls and went on to make 45 senior appearances in Pretoria, however these were largely confined to the Vodacom Cup competition. He was part of the Bulls squad for the 2010 and 2011 Super Rugby season's although he only played in 5 matches.

=== Griquas ===
The lack of activity saw him switch to the Griquas in 2012 and he was the Peacock Blues regular fly-half until the end of 2015. The 2014 Vodacom Cup semi-final match against the Pumas, Brummer set a new domestic record for the fastest drop-goal in a match when he scored one after just 20 seconds.

=== Cheetahs ===
Solid performances for the Griquas saw him named in the Cheetahs squad for the 2013 Super Rugby season and so far he has made one appearance for the men from Bloemfontein.

=== Pumas / Bulls ===
Brummer joined Nelspruit-based side the Pumas for the 2016 season. He joined Super Rugby franchise the Bulls on loan for the 2016 Super Rugby season, rejoining the side from Pretoria where he previously made five Super Rugby appearances.

=== Toyota Industries Shuttles ===
Brummer joined Japanese Top League side Toyota Industries Shuttles for the 2017–18 Top League season.

=== Zebre ===
He moved to Italian Pro14 side Zebre prior to the 2018–19 season. He played also for Zebre in the 2019-20 Pro14 season.

== International ==
Brummer played for South Africa Under-19 in the 2007 Under 19 Rugby World Championship and South Africa Under-20 in the 2008 and 2009 IRB Junior World Championships. He is the leading South African points scorer in the history of the IRB Junior World Championship.

In 2016, he was included in a South Africa 'A' squad that played a two-match series against a touring England Saxons team. He came on as a replacement in their first match in Bloemfontein and scored his side's first try within two minutes of coming on and also converted three tries, but ended on the losing side as the visitors ran out 32–24 winners. He then started the second match of the series, kicking two conversions in a 26–29 defeat to the Saxons in George.
