= Walter Venter =

South African rugby union player

- Full name: Walter Venter
- Born: 7 August 1984 (age 42) Virginia, South Africa
- Height: 1.80 m (5 ft 11 in)
- Weight: 86 kg (13 st 8 lb; 190 lb)
- School: Monument High
- University: University of Johannesburg

Rugby union career
- Position: Centre
Youth career
- 2003–2005: Golden Lions
Amateur team(s)
Years	Team	Apps	(Points)
2009	UJ	2	(0)
Senior career
Years	Team	Apps	(Points)
2005, 2007–2009	Golden Lions	33	(60)
2006	Leopards	2	(0)
2007	Falcons	4	(0)
2008–2010	Lions	18	(5)
2010–2011	Leopards	23	(25)
2012–2013	Griquas	14	(5)
- Correct as of 24 May 2013

Walter Venter (born 7 August 1984) is former a South African rugby union footballer. His regular playing position was centre. He represents the Golden Lions, Leopards, Falcons and Griquas in the domestic Currie Cup and Vodacom Cup competitions during his playing career, as well as playing Super Rugby for the Lions.

He announced his retirement in 2013 due to a cruciate knee ligament injury.

He is now a Gr.6 teacher at Eversdal Primary School in the Bellville area.
