= Monty Dumond =

South African rugby union player

- Full name: Godfried Dumond
- Born: 20 August 1982 (age 44) Klerksdorp
- Height: 1.81 m (5 ft 11 1/2 in)
- Weight: 93 kg (205 lb; 14 st 9 lb)
- School: Orkney High School
- Notable relative: Cecil Dumond (brother)

Rugby union career
- Position: Fly-half
- Current team: Boland Cavaliers
Amateur team(s)
Years	Team	Apps	(Points)
2013–2014	Despatch	13	(135)
2015–present	Hamiltons	6	(73)
Senior career
Years	Team	Apps	(Points)
2003	Sharks (Currie Cup)		
2004	Leopards		
2004	Western Province		
2004–2005	Overmach Parma		
2005–2006	Aurillac	25	(276)
2006–2007	Racing Métro 92	22	(147)
2007–2010	Sharks (Currie Cup)	55	(299)
2008	→ US Oyonnax	6	(17)
2009–2010	Sharks	9	(0)
2010–2012	Eastern Province Kings	13	(118)
2011	→ Griquas	8	(33)
2014	Boland Cavaliers	0	(0)
2019–present	Boland Cavaliers	2	(6)
- Correct as of 1 July 2019

Godfried 'Monty' Dumond (born 20 August 1982) is a South African rugby union player for the Boland Cavaliers in the Currie Cup and the Rugby Challenge.

== Career ==
He started playing for Sharks in youth competitions and had short spells with the Leopards and Western Province during the 2004 Vodacom Cup. He then moved to Europe where he played rugby for Overmach Parma in Italy in 2004-2005, then moved to France for spells at Aurillac in 2005–2006 and Racing Métro 92 in 2006–2007.

He then returned to the Sharks, although he did play for US Oyonnax as a medical joker for a six-month spell in 2008. He was also included in the Sharks Super Rugby squads in 2009 and 2010. In 2010, he joined the Eastern Province Kings on loan during their title-winning 2010 Currie Cup First Division season, finishing as their top points scorer. It was later announced that he would join them on a permanent deal for 2011. Before the 2011 Currie Cup First Division season started, however, it was announced that he joined Griquas on a loan spell.

He returned to the Eastern Province Kings in time for the 2012 Vodacom Cup, but failed to make any appearances in that competition and was released when the season ended.

In 2012, he joined club side Despatch, where he also became the backline coach.

After two seasons at Despatch, Dumond returned to provincial rugby when he joined Wellington-based side Boland Cavaliers for the 2014 Currie Cup qualification tournament.
