= 2012 Currie Cup First Division =

Domestic rugby union competition

- Countries: South Africa
- Date: 30 June – 13 October 2012
- Champions: Eastern Province Kings (2nd title)
- Runners-up: Pumas
- Promoted: None
- Matches played: 59
- Attendance: 203,777 (average 3,454 per match)
- Tries scored: 503 (average 8.5 per match)
- Top point scorer: André Pretorius (166)
- Top try scorer: Allister Kettledas (14)

The 2012 Currie Cup First Division was contested from 30 June to 13 October 2012. The tournament (also known as the Absa Currie Cup First Division for sponsorship reasons) is the second tier of South Africa's premier domestic rugby union competition, featuring teams representing either entire provinces or substantial regions within provinces.

== Competition ==
=== Regular season and title playoffs ===
There were 8 participating teams in the 2012 Currie Cup First Division. These teams played each other twice over the course of the season, once at home and once away.

Teams received four points for a win and two points for a draw. Bonus points were awarded to teams that scored 4 or more tries in a game, as well as to teams losing a match by 7 points or less. Teams were ranked by points, then points difference (points scored less points conceded).

The top 4 teams qualified for the title play-offs. In the semi-finals, the team that finished first had home advantage against the team that finished fourth, while the team that finished second had home advantage against the team that finished third. The winners of these semi-finals played each other in the final, at the home venue of the higher-placed team.

=== Promotion playoffs ===
The top team on the log will also qualify for the promotion/relegation play-offs. That team will play off against the team placed sixth in the 2012 Currie Cup Premier Division over two legs. The winner over these two ties (determined via team tables, with all Currie Cup ranking regulations in effect) will qualify for the 2013 Currie Cup Premier Division, while the losing team will qualify for the 2013 Currie Cup First Division.

== Teams ==
Location of teams in 2012 Currie Cup First Division

=== Changes from 2011 ===
- Leopards and Pumas were relegated to the First Division.

=== Team Listing ===
Team	Stadium	Capacity
Boland Cavaliers	Boland Stadium, Wellington	7,500
Boland Cavaliers	Boland Park, Worcester	5,000
Boland Cavaliers	Wesbank Sports Grounds, Malmesbury	4,500
Border Bulldogs	Buffalo City Stadium, East London	16,000
Eastern Province Kings	Nelson Mandela Bay Stadium, Port Elizabeth	48,459
Falcons	Barnard Stadium, Kempton Park	7,000
Griffons	North West Stadium, Welkom	17,000
Leopards	Profert Olën Park, Potchefstroom	15,000
Pumas	Mbombela Stadium, Mbombela	40,929
SWD Eagles	Outeniqua Park, George	10,000

== Table ==
2012 Currie Cup First Division Table
Pos	Team	Pld	W	D	L	PF	PA	PD	TF	TA	TB	LB	Pts	Qualification
1	Eastern Province Kings (C)	14	12	2	0	515	246	+269	64	27	10	0	62	Promotion Play-Offs; Semi-finals
2	Pumas	14	9	2	3	525	365	+160	64	46	9	1	50	Semi-finals
3	Griffons	14	9	0	5	476	491	−15	65	70	10	2	48	Semi-finals
4	Leopards	14	8	0	6	511	449	+62	66	51	10	2	44	Semi-finals
5	SWD Eagles	14	8	1	5	473	445	+28	60	56	8	1	43	
6	Boland Cavaliers	14	3	2	9	466	487	−21	63	67	8	6	30	
7	Falcons	14	3	1	10	393	598	−205	56	82	7	2	23	
8	Border Bulldogs	14	0	0	14	315	593	−278	41	80	6	5	11	

Rules for classification: 4 points for a win; 2 points for a draw; 1 bonus point for a loss by seven points or less; 1 bonus point for scoring four or more tries in a match
(C) Champion

== Fixtures and results ==
All times are South African (GMT+2).

=== Regular season ===
==== Round one ====
29 June 2012	Boland Cavaliers	20 – 25	Eastern Province Kings	Boland Stadium, Wellington
15:00	Try: Jacquin Jansen 19', 42'; Con: Elgar Watts 19', 43' (2/2); Pen: Elgar Watts 64' (1/1); Ricardo Croy 82' (1/1)	Scoreboard	Try: George Whitehead 12'; Cornell du Preez 32'; SP Marais 69'; Con: George Whitehead 13' (1/2); Wesley Dunlop 70' (1/1); Pen: George Whitehead 5' (1/3); Wesley Dunlop 78' (1/1); Drop: Wesley Dunlop (0/1)	Attendance: 600; Referee: Jason Jaftha

29 June 2012	SWD Eagles	46 – 8	Border Bulldogs	Outeniqua Park, George
19:00	Try: Alshaun Bock 1'; Elric van Vuuren 23'; Jéan Rossouw 30'; Dumisani Meslane 52'; Johan Herbst 54'; Kempie Rautenbach 77'; Con: Kurt Coleman 2', 24', 31', 55', 78' (5/6); Pen: Kurt Coleman 10', 16' (2/2); Cards: Lehan Koekemoer (yellow card) 39' to 49'	Scoreboard	Try: Chrislyn van Schalkwyk 35'; Con: Ntabeni Dukisa (0/1); Pen: Louis Kruger (0/1); Ntabeni Dukisa 40' (1/2); Cards: Gareth Krause (red card) 39'; Armon Fourie (yellow card) 51' to 61'; Ntando Kebe (yellow card) 73'	Attendance: 1,000; Referee: Joey Salmans

30 June 2012	Leopards	32 – 23	Pumas	Olën Park, Potchefstroom
14:30	Try: Allister Kettledas 5'; Danie Dames 38', 47', 63'; Juan Pretorius 59'; Con: Gerhard Nortier (0/3); Adriaan Engelbrecht 60', 64' (2/2); Pen: Gerhard Nortier (0/1); Adriaan Engelbrecht 71' (1/1)	Scoreboard	Try: JW Jonker 11'; Jaco Bouwer 78'; Con: JC Roos 12', 79' (2/2); Pen: JC Roos 24', 35', 51' (3/3)	Attendance: 1,000; Referee: Tiaan Jonker

30 June 2012	Falcons	27 – 37	Griffons	Barnard Stadium, Kempton Park
15:00	Try: Sandile Ngcobo 4'; Marco Kotzé 29'; JW Bell 31'; Reg Muller 36'; Con: Jaun Kotzé (0/1); Karlo Aspeling 30', 32' (2/3); Pen: Karlo Aspeling 62' (1/1); Cards: Shöne Van der Walt (yellow card) 49' to 59'	Scoreboard	Try: Hansie Graaff 9'; Charles Marais 52'; Willie Britz 55'; Tertius Maarman 71', 76'; Con: Tiaan van Wyk (0/1); Hansie Graaff 53', 72', 77' (3/3); Tertius Maarman (0/1); Pen: Tiaan van Wyk 17', 40' (2/3)	Attendance: 300; Referee: Pro Legoete

==== Round two ====
6 July 2012	Border Bulldogs	11 – 33	Falcons	Buffalo City Stadium, East London
19:00	Try: Lubabalo Mzwakali 52'; Con: Logan Basson (0/1); Pen: Reinhardt Gerber 10', 15' (2/3)	Scoreboard	Try: Karlo Aspeling 4'; Vernon du Preez 35'; Willie Odendaal 39'; Jacques Nieuwenhuis 41', 63'; Con: Karlo Aspeling 5', 36', 42', 64' (4/5); Pen: Karlo Aspeling (0/1); Drop: Karlo Aspeling (0/1)	Attendance: 1,050; Referee: Jason Jaftha

6 July 2012	Eastern Province Kings	38 – 15	SWD Eagles	Nelson Mandela Bay Stadium, Port Elizabeth
19:00	Try: Wimpie van der Walt 43'; SP Marais 45'; Cornell du Preez 51'; George Whitehead 64'; Con: George Whitehead 46', 52', 65' (3/4); Pen: George Whitehead 13', 17', 31', 40' (4/4)	Scoreboard	Try: Alshaun Bock 35'; Deroy Rhoode 73'; Con: Kurt Coleman 74' (1/2); Pen: Kurt Coleman 6' (1/2)	Attendance: 4,584; Referee: Rasta Rashivenga

7 July 2012	Griffons	41 – 20	Leopards	North West Stadium, Welkom
15:00	Try: Japie Nel 21'; Tertius Maarman 57'; Reinhardt Erwee 72'; Werner Griesel 80'; Con: Reinhardt Erwee 22', 73', 81' (3/4); Pen: Reinhardt Erwee 10', 26', 32', 42', 64' (5/5); Cards: Gavin Annandale (yellow card) 75'	Scoreboard	Try: George Tossel 43', 61'; Juan Pretorius 66'; Con: Gerhard Nortier (0/1); Adriaan Engelbrecht 62' (1/2); Pen: Gerhard Nortier 12' (1/2)	Attendance: 1,200; Referee: Lourens van der Merwe

7 July 2012	Pumas	33 – 10	Boland Cavaliers	Mbombela Stadium, Mbombela
15:00	Try: Jaco Bouwer 3', 16', 24'; Carl Bezuidenhout 9'; JW Jonker 63'; Con: Carl Bezuidenhout 4', 10', 17', 64' (4/5)	Scoreboard	Try: Johnathan Francke 67'; Con: Elgar Watts 68' (1/1); Pen: Elgar Watts 8' (1/1)	Attendance: 4,000; Referee: Ben Crouse

==== Round three ====
13 July 2012	Boland Cavaliers	21 – 23	Leopards	Wesbank Sports Grounds, Malmesbury
15:00	Try: Elgar Watts 29'; Franzel September 47'; Milroy Isaacs 75'; Con: Elgar Watts 30', 48', 76' (3/3); Pen: Elgar Watts (0/3); Cards: Junior Bester (yellow card) 44' to 54'	Scoreboard	Try: Siyanda Ndlovu 4'; Edgar Marutlulle 53'; Hoffmann Maritz 60'; Con: André Pretorius 5' (1/1); Adriaan Engelbrecht (0/2); Pen: Adriaan Engelbrecht 14', 70' (2/2); Cards: Robert Kruger (yellow card) 76'	Attendance: 1,300; Referee: Pro Legoete

13 July 2012	Griffons	29 – 24	Border Bulldogs	North West Stadium, Welkom
15:00	Try: Reinhardt Erwee 6', 67'; Japie Nel 46'; Werner Griesel 62'; Con: Reinhardt Erwee 7', 63', 68' (3/4); Pen: Reinhardt Erwee 16' (1/2)	Scoreboard	Try: Sinovuyo Nyoka 58'; Thembani Mkokeli 75'; Chrislyn van Schalkwyk 82'; Con: Ntabeni Dukisa 59' (1/1); Louis Kruger 75', 83' (2/2); Pen: Ntabeni Dukisa 32' (1/2)	Attendance: 1,000; Referee: Joey Salmans

13 July 2012	SWD Eagles	22 – 16	Pumas	Outeniqua Park, George
19:00	Try: Johan Herbst 58'; Con: Kurt Coleman 59' (1/1); Pen: Kurt Coleman 16', 23', 37', 44' (4/4); Theuns Kotzé 68' (1/2)	Scoreboard	Try: RW Kember 13'; Renaldo Bothma 80'; Con: JC Roos (0/2); Pen: JC Roos 4', 48' (2/2); Cards: Dewald Pretorius (yellow card) 68' to 78'	Attendance: 2,300; Referee: Sindile Mayende

14 July 2012	Falcons	20 – 37	Eastern Province Kings	Barnard Stadium, Kempton Park
15:00	Try: Reg Muller 40'; JW Bell 55'; Uzair Cassiem 63'; Con: Karlo Aspeling 64' (1/3); Pen: Karlo Aspeling 25' (1/2); Drop: Arno Poley (0/1); Cards: Hannes Ludik (yellow card) 17' to 28'	Scoreboard	Try: Michael Killian 18'; Clint Newland 28'; Jongi Nokwe 37'; Lizo Gqoboka 49'; Con: George Whitehead 19', 29', 38', 49' (4/4); Pen: George Whitehead 2' (1/1); Wesley Dunlop 71', 79' (2/2); Cards: Hannes Franklin (yellow card) 61' to 71'	Attendance: 300; Referee: Stuart Berry

==== Round four ====
20 July 2012	Boland Cavaliers	20 – 23	Griffons	Boland Park, Worcester
16:00	Try: Ashton Constant 17'; Elgar Watts 26'; Brendon April 33'; Con: Elgar Watts 18' (1/2); Jacquin Jansen (0/1); Pen: Elgar Watts 48' (1/2)	Scoreboard	Try: Derick van Heerden 22'; Tertius Maarman 44'; Willie Britz 66'; Con: Reinhardt Erwee 45' (1/3); Pen: Reinhardt Erwee 2', 70' (2/5)	Attendance: 4,000; Referee: Archie Sehlako

20 July 2012	Eastern Province Kings	56 – 5	Border Bulldogs	Nelson Mandela Bay Stadium, Port Elizabeth
19:10	Try: Luke Watson 11', 47'; Wayne Stevens 22'; Wayne van Heerden 38', 58'; SP Marais 53'; Scott van Breda 61' penalty try 80'; Con: Wesley Dunlop 12', 23', 39', 48', 54', 59', 62' (7/7); George Whitehead 81' (1/1)	Scoreboard	Try: Gareth Krause 25'; Con: Ntabeni Dukisa (0/1)	Attendance: 3,000; Referee: Quinton Immelman

21 July 2012	Leopards	68 – 35	SWD Eagles	Olën Park, Potchefstroom
15:00	Try: Allister Kettledas 10', 39', 47', 51', 69'; Joubert Engelbrecht 22'; Stompie de Wet 35'; Johann Laker 44'; Con: André Pretorius 11', 23', 36', 40', 45', 48', 52' (7/7); Adriaan Engelbrecht 70' (1/1); Pen: André Pretorius 14', 18', 27' (3/4); Adriaan Engelbrecht (0/1); Drop: André Pretorius 29' (1/1)	Scoreboard	Try: Alshaun Bock 11'; Dumisani Meslane 55'; Baldwin McBean 57'; Elric van Vuuren 78'; Wayne Khan 80'; Con: Theuns Kotzé 12', 56', 58', 79', 81' (5/5); Drop: Alshaun Bock (0/1); Theuns Kotzé (0/1); Cards: Grant le Roux (yellow card) 24' to 36'; Mzo Dyantyi (yellow card) 65' to 75'	Attendance: 3,600; Referee: Stuart Berry

21 July 2012	Pumas	36 – 35	Falcons	Mbombela Stadium, Mbombela
15:00	Try: Renaldo Bothma 38'; Ashwin Scott 48'; Carl Bezuidenhout 53'; RW Kember 77'; Con: Carl Bezuidenhout 39' (1/3); JC Roos 78' (1/1); Pen: Carl Bezuidenhout 9', 27', 44', 60' (4/5)	Scoreboard	Try: Uzair Cassiem 7'; JW Bell 13', 29'; Karlo Aspeling 57', 62'; Con: Karlo Aspeling 30' (1/4); Arno Poley 63' (1/1); Pen: Karlo Aspeling 51' (1/1); Drop: Karlo Aspeling 36' (1/1); Cards: Bovril de Bruin (yellow card) 72'	Attendance: 500; Referee: Marius Jonker

==== Round Five ====
27 July 2012	Border Bulldogs	18 – 51	Pumas	Buffalo City Stadium, East London
19:00	Try: Gareth Krause 75'; Matthew Taljard 80'; Con: Quinton Crocker 81' (1/2); Pen: Quinton Crocker 11', 32' (2/3)	Scoreboard	Try: Dewald Pretorius 19'; Corné Fourie 33'; Rudi Mathee 56'; Renaldo Bothma 65'; Torsten van Jaarsveld 68'; Nqubeko Zulu 78'; Con: Naas Olivier 20', 34', 57', 66', 69', 79' (6/6); Pen: Naas Olivier 2', 5', 9' (3/3)	Attendance: 500; Referee: Sindile Mayende

27 July 2012	SWD Eagles	21 – 21	Boland Cavaliers	Outeniqua Park, George
19:00	Try: Mzo Dyantyi 1'; Stokkies Hanekom 4'; Con: Theuns Kotzé 2' (1/2); Pen: Theuns Kotzé 23', 53', 78' (3/5)	Scoreboard	Try: Elgar Watts 20'; Lungelo Payi 26'; Con: Elgar Watts 21' (1/2); Pen: Elgar Watts 12', 59', 79' (3/3); Cards: Vainon Willis (yellow card) 3' to 14'	Attendance: 850; Referee: Marius van der Westhuizen

28 July 2012	Falcons	22 – 51	Leopards	Barnard Stadium, Kempton Park
14:05	Try: Sino Ganto 38'; Willie Odendaal 45'; JC Greyling 76'; Con: Karlo Aspeling 46', 77' (2/3); Pen: Karlo Aspeling 21' (1/1); Drop: Karlo Aspeling (0/1)	Scoreboard	Try: Stompie de Wet 8'; Allister Kettledas 15'; Danie Dames 41', 62', 70'; Hoffmann Maritz 55'; Con: André Pretorius 9', 16', 42', 56', 63' (5/5); Adriaan Engelbrecht 71' (1/1); Pen: André Pretorius 14' (1/1)); Adriaan Engelbrecht 81' (1/1); Drop: André Pretorius 23' (1/2)	Attendance: 500; Referee: Joey Salmans

28 July 2012	Griffons	10 – 34	Eastern Province Kings	North West Stadium, Welkom
15:00	Try: Nicky Steyn 55'; Francois Uys 72'; Con: Reinhardt Erwee (0/2); Cards: Hansie Graaff (yellow card) 63' to 73'	Scoreboard	Try: Marcello Sampson 19'; Thabo Mamojele 22'; George Whitehead 30'; Tiger Mangweni 51'; Con: George Whitehead 20', 23', 31', 52' (4/4); Pen: George Whitehead 9', 41' (2/3)	Attendance: 2,300; Referee: Pro Legoete

==== Round Six ====
3 August 2012	Pumas	30 – 30	Eastern Province Kings	Puma Stadium, Witbank
19:10	Try: Renaldo Bothma 51'; JW Jonker 59'; Tiaan Marx 80'; Con: JC Roos 52', 60', 81' (3/3); Pen: JC Roos 16', 28', 38' (3/3)	Scoreboard	Try: Marcello Sampson 7'; David Bulbring 34'; Hannes Franklin 43'; Con: George Whitehead 8', 35', 44' (3/3); Pen: George Whitehead 24', 49', 71' (3/5)	Attendance: 8,900; Referee: Jaco Peyper

3 August 2012	SWD Eagles	20 – 13	Griffons	Outeniqua Park, George
19:10	Try: Alshaun Bock 3'; Grant Kemp 17'; Con: Elric van Vuuren 4', 18' (2/2); Pen: Elric van Vuuren 7', 76' (2/2); Cards: Michael Vermaak (yellow card) 61' to 70'; Mzo Dyantyi (yellow card) 65' to 76'	Scoreboard	Try: Hansie Graaff 54'; Nicky Steyn 68'; Con: Tiaan van Wyk (0/2); Pen: Tiaan van Wyk 71' (1/1); Cards: Martin Sithole (yellow card) 62' to 72'	Attendance: 700; Referee: Lusanda Jam

4 August 2012	Boland Cavaliers	79 – 26	Falcons	Boland Stadium, Wellington
14:45	Try: Zandré Jordaan 2'; Franzel September 6', 26'; Elgar Watts 12'; Neil Papier 34', 45'; Cornal Hendricks 43', 58'; Madoda Yako 64'; Brendon April 66', 79'; PJ van Zyl 76'; Con: Elgar Watts 7', 13', 27', 44', 46' (5/7); Ricardo Croy 58', 65', 67' (3/5); Pen: Elgar Watts 9' (1/1)	Scoreboard	Try: Jaco Oosthuizen 16', 38'; Nico Pretorius 30'; JC Greyling 61'; Con: Karlo Aspeling 17', 31' (2/3); Jaun Kotzé 62' (1/1)	Attendance: 5,000; Referee: Matt Kemp

4 August 2012	Leopards	53 – 28	Border Bulldogs	Olën Park, Potchefstroom
19:10	Try: Stompie de Wet 10', 26', 33', 68'; Joubert Engelbrecht 22'; Danie Dames 48'; Gerhard Nortier 79'; Con: André Pretorius 11', 27', 34', 49', 69', 80' (6/7); Pen: André Pretorius 2', 18' (2/2)	Scoreboard	Try: Ruan Jacobs 7'; Lesley Luiters 42'; Jannie Myburgh 62'; Gareth Krause 74'; Con: Jannie Myburgh 8', 43', 63', 75' (4/4)	Attendance: 1,200; Referee: Lourens van der Merwe

==== Round Seven ====
10 August 2012	Eastern Province Kings	20 – 12	Leopards	Nelson Mandela Bay Stadium, Port Elizabeth
19:00	Try: Paul Perez 50'; Con: George Whitehead (0/1); Pen: George Whitehead 5', 28', 55' (3/4); Wesley Dunlop 65', 75' (2/2); Cards: Clint Newland (yellow card) 44' to 54'	Scoreboard	Pen: André Pretorius 19', 36', 44', 59' (4/6); Drop: André Pretorius (0/2)	Attendance: 4,103; Referee: Pro Legoete

11 August 2012	Border Bulldogs	32 – 39	Boland Cavaliers	Buffalo City Stadium, East London
15:00	Try: Chumani Booi 10'; Ruan Jacobs 18'; Shane Spring 28'; Lesley Luiters 43'; Chrislyn van Schalkwyk 48'; Con: Jannie Myburgh (0/3); Quinton Crocker 44', 49' (2/2); Pen: Jannie Myburgh 3' (1/1)	Scoreboard	Try: Jacquin Jansen 35', 38'; Eric Zana 68'; Johnathan Francke 70'; Con: Jacquin Jansen 36', 69' (2/4); Pen: Jacquin Jansen 24', 47', 60', 62', 79' (5/6); Drop: Jacquin Jansen (0/1)	Attendance: 1,500; Referee: Ben Crouse

11 August 2012	Falcons	22 – 47	SWD Eagles	Barnard Stadium, Kempton Park
15:00	Try: Hendrik Meyer 29'; Hannes Ludik 59'; Jaun Kotzé 63'; Con: Karlo Aspeling (0/1); Jaun Kotzé 60', 64' (2/2); Pen: Karlo Aspeling 6' (1/1); Cards: MC Botes (yellow card) 55' to 66'	Scoreboard	Try: Johan Herbst 8'; Elric van Vuuren 15'; Stokkies Hanekom 20', 53'; Alshaun Bock 73'; Dumisani Meslane 77'; Con: Elric van Vuuren 9', 21', 54', 74' (4/6); Pen: Elric van Vuuren 2', 18', 68' (3/4)	Attendance: 500; Referee: Craig Joubert

11 August 2012	Griffons	34 – 67	Pumas	North West Stadium, Welkom
15:00	Try: Werner Griesel 3', 30'; Hansie Graaff 35'; Sarel Louw 38'; Shane Hancke 58'; Con: Tiaan van Wyk 31', 36', 39' (3/5); Pen: Tiaan van Wyk 50' (1/2)	Scoreboard	Try: Corné Fourie 5'; Carl Bezuidenhout 22', 75'; Uzair Cassiem 32', 60'; JW Jonker 40', 41', 64'; Eduan van der Walt 51' penalty try 67'; Con: JC Roos 6', 33', 41', 61', 65', 68', 76' (7/10); Pen: JC Roos 45' (1/1)	Attendance: 1,800; Referee: Jonathan Kaplan

==== Round Eight ====
17 August 2012	Griffons	36 – 39	Falcons	North West Stadium, Welkom
15:00	Try: Rudi Britz 5'; Nicky Steyn 7', 19'; Reinhardt Erwee 32'; Chris Ehlers 62'; Ossie Nortjé 65'; Con: Tiaan van Wyk 6' (1/4); Hansie Graaff 63', 66' (2/2); Cards: Reinhardt Erwee (yellow card) 53' to 63'	Scoreboard	Try: Nico Engelbrecht 1'; Anrich Richter 38', 53'; JW Bell 41', 45', 70'; Con: Karlo Aspeling 50', 54' (2/5); Jaun Kotzé 71' (1/1); Pen: Jaun Kotzé 81' (1/1)	Attendance: 1,200; Referee: Jason Jaftha

17 August 2012	Border Bulldogs	27 – 33	SWD Eagles	Buffalo City Stadium, East London
19:00	Try: Chumani Booi 2'; Frans Laatz 16', 28'; Con: Jannie Myburgh 3', 17', 29' (3/3); Pen: Jannie Myburgh 36', 79' (2/3); Drop: Jannie Myburgh (0/1); Cards: Deroy Rhoode (yellow card) 52' to 62'	Scoreboard	Try: Johan Herbst 10', 71'; Shaun Raubenheimer 21'; Theuns Kotzé 26'; Jeff Taljard 56'; Con: Theuns Kotzé 11', 27', 57', 72' (4/5); Pen: Theuns Kotzé (0/1); Drop: Theuns Kotzé (0/1)	Attendance: 1,450; Referee: Stuart Berry

17 August 2012	Eastern Province Kings	57 – 19	Boland Cavaliers	Nelson Mandela Bay Stadium, Port Elizabeth
19:00	Try: Luke Watson 8', 45'; Clint Newland 13'; Tiger Mangweni 21'; Wesley Dunlop 28'; SP Marais 32'; Cornell du Preez 60'; Wimpie van der Walt 78'; Con: Wesley Dunlop 9', 14', 29', 33', 46', 61' (6/7); George Whitehead 79' (1/1); Pen: Wesley Dunlop 40' (1/1)	Scoreboard	Try: PJ van Zyl 35'; Nolan Clark 50'; Senan van der Merwe 74'; Con: Jacquin Jansen 51' (1/2); Eric Zana 75' (1/1)	Attendance: 3,794; Referee: Jaco Peyper

17 August 2012	Pumas	38 – 27	Leopards	Puma Stadium, Witbank
19:00	Try: RW Kember 29', 34'; Shaun Venter 57'; Coenie van Wyk 76'; Con: JC Roos 30', 58', 77' (3/4); Pen: JC Roos 7', 22', 43', 74' (4/5); Drop: JC Roos (0/1)	Scoreboard	Try: Allister Kettledas 14'; SJ Niemand 52'; Stompie de Wet 66'; Jaco Grobler 79'; Con: André Pretorius 15', 67' (2/4); Pen: André Pretorius 13' (1/1)	Attendance: 4,500; Referee: Ben Crouse

==== Round Nine ====
24 August 2012	Boland Cavaliers	33 – 36	Pumas	Boland Park, Worcester
15:00	Try: Zandré Jordaan 25'; Brendon April 33'; Eric Zana 56'; Senan van der Merwe 73'; Con: Jacquin Jansen 26', 56' (2/4); Pen: Jacquin Jansen 4', 31', 72' (3/3)	Scoreboard	Try: MJ Mentz 20'; Uzair Cassiem 46'; Shaun Venter 69'; Con: JC Roos 21', 47', 70' (3/3); Pen: JC Roos 9', 38', 43', 59', 76' (5/5); Trompie Pretorius (0/1); Drop: JC Roos (0/1)	Attendance: 4,100; Referee: Jason Jaftha

24 August 2012	SWD Eagles	7 – 29	Eastern Province Kings	Outeniqua Park, George
19:10	Try: Lyndon Hartnick 63'; Con: Elric van Vuuren 64' (1/1); Pen: Theuns Kotzé (0/1); Drop: Theuns Kotzé (0/1); Cards: Clinton Wagman (yellow card) 10' to 20'	Scoreboard	Try: Norman Nelson 16'; Wesley Dunlop 34'; Wayne Stevens 49'; Clint Newland 56'; Con: Wesley Dunlop 35', 50', 57' (3/4); Pen: Wesley Dunlop 43' (1/2); George Whitehead (0/1)	Attendance: 2,500; Referee: Quinton Immelman

25 August 2012	Falcons	38 – 36	Border Bulldogs	Barnard Stadium, Kempton Park
15:00	Try: Reg Muller 4', 49'; Sandile Ngcobo 18'; Jacques Alberts 33'; JW Bell 36'; Hendrik Meyer 62'; Con: Karlo Aspeling 5', 19', 37', 50' (4/5); Jaun Kotzé (0/1); Pen: Karlo Aspeling (0/1); Cards: James Jackson (yellow card) 65' to 75'	Scoreboard	Try: Lesley Luiters 25'; Gareth Krause 55'; Nomani Tonga 66'; Brian Shabangu 74'; Ruan Jacobs 79'; Con: Jannie Myburgh 26' (1/1); Reinhardt Gerber 56', 67' (2/3); Louis Kruger 80' (1/1); Pen: Jannie Myburgh 17' (1/2)	Attendance: 650; Referee: Tiaan Jonker

25 August 2012	Leopards	32 – 38	Griffons	Olën Park, Potchefstroom
15:00	Try: Siyanda Ndlovu 29'; BG Uys 36'; Hoffmann Maritz 43'; Marius Fourie 46'; Con: André Pretorius 30', 37', 47' (3/4); Pen: André Pretorius 22', 75' (2/3); Drop: André Pretorius (0/1)	Scoreboard	Try: Hansie Graaff 12'; Chris Ehlers 50'; Martin Sithole 68', 76'; Con: Hansie Graaff 13', 69', 77' (3/4); Pen: Hansie Graaff 2', 33', 39', 73' (4/4); Drop: Hansie Graaff (0/2)	Attendance: 7,800; Referee: Jonathan Kaplan

==== Round Ten ====
31 August 2012	Eastern Province Kings	45 – 24	Falcons	Nelson Mandela Bay Stadium, Port Elizabeth
19:00	Try: Luke Watson 8', 15' penalty try 25'; Cornell du Preez 61', 66'; Jaco Engels 73'; Wayne Stevens 78'; Con: George Whitehead 9', 26' (2/3); Wesley Dunlop 62', 67', 74' (3/4)	Scoreboard	Try: Jaco Oosthuizen 12'; Reg Muller 27'; Con: Karlo Aspeling 13' (1/2); Pen: Karlo Aspeling 20', 41', 47' (3/3); Drop: Karlo Aspeling 44' (1/1)	Attendance: 1,948; Referee: Stuart Berry

31 August 2012	Border Bulldogs	33 – 53	Griffons	Buffalo City Stadium, East London
19:00	Try: Ruan Jacobs 2'; Quinton Crocker 20'; Brian Shabangu 51'; Marius Visser 54'; Shane Spring 57'; Con: Reinhardt Gerber 21', 52', 55', 58' (4/5)	Scoreboard	Try: Shane Hancke 12', 32'; Erik le Roux 27'; Joubert Horn 41'; Martin Sithole 43', 59', 66'; Con: Hansie Graaff 13', 33', 42', 44', 60', 67' (6/7); Pen: Hansie Graaff 7', 15' (2/2)	Attendance: 1,000; Referee: Sindile Mayende

1 September 2012	Leopards	39 – 34	Boland Cavaliers	Olën Park, Potchefstroom
15:00	Try: Berty Visser 1'; Marius Fourie 24'; Jaco Grobler 41'; Robert Kruger 52'; Edgar Marutlulle 60'; Brendon Snyman 67'; Con: André Pretorius 2', 41', 68' (3/6); Pen: André Pretorius 37' (1/1)	Scoreboard	Try: Cheswin Williams 18'; Eric Zana 28'; Cornal Hendricks 38'; Zandré Jordaan 46'; Con: Cheswin Williams 47' (1/4); Pen: Cheswin Williams 7', 16', 34', 57' (4/4)	Attendance: 1,350; Referee: Marius Jonker

1 September 2012	Pumas	70 – 27	SWD Eagles	Mbombela Stadium, Mbombela
15:00	Try: Jaco Bouwer 1', 32', 69'; Trompie Pretorius 20'; Uzair Cassiem 24'; Wilhelm Loock 37', 41'; Nqubeko Zulu 58'; JW Jonker 75'; Ashwin Scott 84'; Con: JC Roos 2', 21', 25', 33', 38', 42', 59', 70', 76' (9/9); Doppies le Roux 85' (1/1); Pen: JC Roos (0/1)	Scoreboard	Try: Wayne Khan 60'; Elric van Vuuren 77', 78'; Con: Elric van Vuuren 61', 78', 79' (2/2); Pen: Elric van Vuuren 10', 22' (2/2)	Attendance: 3,700; Referee: Joey Salmans

==== Round Eleven ====
7 September 2012	SWD Eagles	64 – 34	Leopards	Outeniqua Park, George
19:00	Try: Clinton Wagman 2'; Johan Herbst 4', 77', 79'; Stokkies Hanekom 31'; Ghafoer Luckan 41'; Jeff Taljard 74'; Con: Elric van Vuuren 3', 5', 32', 42', 75', 77', 80' (7/7); Pen: Elric van Vuuren 9', 27', 64' (3/3); Drop: Burton Francis 68', 70' (2/2)	Scoreboard	Try: Hoffmann Maritz 10'; Strand Kruger 35'; Berty Visser 52'; Adriaan Engelbrecht 57'; Con: André Pretorius 11', 36', 53', 58' (4/4); Pen: André Pretorius 19', 39' (2/2); Cards: Robert Kruger (yellow card) 6' to 16'	Attendance: 3,800; Referee: Quinton Immelman

7 September 2012	Border Bulldogs	19 – 35	Eastern Province Kings	Buffalo City Stadium, East London
19:10	Try: Theunis Lambrechts 74'; Con: Jannie Myburgh 75' (1/1); Pen: Reinhardt Gerber 6', 36' (2/3); Jannie Myburgh 56', 62' (2/2)	Scoreboard	Try: Cornell du Preez 31', 45', 59'; Tiger Mangweni 67'; Con: Wesley Dunlop 32', 46', 68' (3/4); Pen: Wesley Dunlop 16', 41', 50' (3/3)	Attendance: 500; Referee: Rasta Rasivhenge

8 September 2012	Falcons	22 – 29	Pumas	Barnard Stadium, Kempton Park
15:00	Try: Jacques Nieuwenhuis 18'; Anrich Richter 22'; Willie Odendaal 42'; Con: Karlo Aspeling 19', 43' (2/3); Pen: Karlo Aspeling (0/1); Jaun Kotzé 78' (1/1)	Scoreboard	Try: JC Roos 28'; Wilhelm Loock 59'; JW Jonker 62'; Naas Olivier 69'; Con: JC Roos 29', 60', 63' (3/4); Pen: JC Roos 45' (1/2); Cards: De-Jay Terblanche (yellow card) 6' to 16'	Attendance: 1,200; Referee: Ben Crouse

8 September 2012	Griffons	54 – 37	Boland Cavaliers	North West Stadium, Welkom
15:00	Try: Japie Nel 4'; Cameron Jacobs 22' penalty try 31'; Joubert Horn 35'; Shane Hancke 42'; Martin Sithole 59'; Werner Griesel 77'; Thabang Molefe 80'; Con: Hansie Graaff 5', 23', 32', 36', 42', 81' (6/7); Werner Griesel 77' (1/1); Cards: Chris Ehlers (yellow card) 3' to 47'	Scoreboard	Try: Franzel September 9', 39', 48'; Brendon April 17'; Siviwe Magaba 62'; Con: Jacquin Jansen 10', 40', 63' (3/5); Pen: Jacquin Jansen 13', 33' (2/2); Cards: Bolla Conradie (yellow card) 32' to 42'	Attendance: 2,900; Referee: Marius van der Westhuizen

==== Round Twelve ====
14 September 2012	Eastern Province Kings	60 – 19	Griffons	Nelson Mandela Bay Stadium, Port Elizabeth
19:00	Try: Paul Perez 11'; SP Marais 14'; Cornell du Preez 25'; Luke Watson 37', 61', 66'; George Whitehead 47'; Tiger Mangweni 55'; Siyanda Grey 69'; Con: George Whitehead 12', 26', 38', 48', 56', 62' (6/9); Pen: George Whitehead 4' (1/1); Drop: George Whitehead (0/1); Cards: Falie Oelschig (yellow card) 31' to 41'	Scoreboard	Try: Hannes Snyman 44'; Cameron Jacobs 50'; Nicky Steyn 79'; Con: Hansie Graaff 50', 80' (2/3)	Attendance: 5,876; Referee: Ben Crouse

14 September 2012	Leopards	57 – 22	Falcons	Olën Park, Potchefstroom
19:10	Try: Juan Pretorius 17'; Adriaan Engelbrecht 18', 41'; Allister Kettledas 28', 37', 72'; Gerhard Nortier 52'; Morné Hanekom 60'; Con: André Pretorius 17', 29', 38', 42', 53', 61' (6/7); Gerhard Nortier 73' (1/1); Pen: André Pretorius 9' (1/1); Drop: André Pretorius (0/1); Cards: Morné Hanekom (yellow card) 33' to 42'	Scoreboard	Try: JW Bell 51'; Anrich Richter 65'; Sandile Ngcobo 68'; Con: Karlo Aspeling 52', 66' (2/3); Pen: Jaun Kotzé 24' (1/2); Cards: Nico Pretorius (yellow card) 13' to 25'	Attendance: 3,600; Referee: Craig Joubert

15 September 2012	Pumas	41 – 10	Border Bulldogs	Puma Stadium, Witbank
15:00	Try: Coenie van Wyk 15'; Shaun Venter 24', 73'; JW Jonker 27'; Wilhelm Loock 49'; Con: Naas Olivier 16', 25', 28', 50' (4/4); Carl Bezuidenhout 74' (1/1); Pen: Naas Olivier 34', 47' (2/2)	Scoreboard	Try: Niell Jacobs 65'; Con: Reinhardt Gerber 66' (1/1); Pen: Reinhardt Gerber 22' (1/1)	Attendance: 14,305; Referee: Tiaan Jonker

15 September 2012	Boland Cavaliers	38 – 42	SWD Eagles	Boland Stadium, Wellington
16:00	Try: Cornal Hendricks 1'; Bolla Conradie 36'; PJ van Zyl 47'; Nolan Clark 60'; Elgar Watts 78'; Con: Elgar Watts 2', 37', 48', 61', 79' (5/5); Pen: Elgar Watts 16' (1/1); Cards: Hanno Kitshoff (yellow card) 27' to 37'	Scoreboard	Try: Dumisani Meslane 3'; Wilhelm Koch 12'; Ghafoer Luckan 17'; Grant Kemp 25'; Grant le Roux 29'; Con: Elric van Vuuren 13', 18', 26', 30' (4/5); Pen: Elric van Vuuren 10', 69', 72' (3/3)	Attendance: 1,800; Referee: Joey Salmans

==== Round Thirteen ====
21 September 2012	Border Bulldogs	40 – 43	Leopards	Buffalo City Stadium, East London
19:00	Try: Chumani Booi 17'; Niell Jacobs 28', 63' penalty try 44'; Gareth Krause 70'; Joe Seerane 74'; Con: Reinhardt Gerber 18', 29', 45', 71', 75' (5/6); Pen: Niell Jacobs (0/1); Cards: Shane Spring (yellow card) 19' to 29'; Joe Seerane (yellow card) 23' to 33'	Scoreboard	Try: Justin St Jerry 2'; Hennie Skorbinski 16'; Allister Kettledas 21', 59'; Malan van der Merwe 40'; Brendon Snyman 50'; Con: André Pretorius 3', 17', 22', 40', 60' (5/6); Pen: André Pretorius 10' (1/1); Cards: Robert Kruger (yellow card) 22' to 33'; Juan Pretorius (yellow card) 45' to 55'	Attendance: 1,700; Referee: Lourens van der Merwe

21 September 2012	Eastern Province Kings	26 – 26	Pumas	Nelson Mandela Bay Stadium, Port Elizabeth
19:10	Try: Marcello Sampson 9'; Tiger Mangweni 56'; Luke Watson 73', 78'; Con: George Whitehead 57', 74', 79' (3/4); Cards: Paul Perez (red card) 26'; David Bulbring (yellow card) 31' to 44'	Scoreboard	Try: JW Jonker 4'; Coenie van Wyk 43'; Con: JC Roos 5', 44' (2/2); Pen: JC Roos 13', 17', 19', 54' (4/4); Cards: Jaco Bouwer (yellow card) 66' to '	Attendance: 15,845; Referee: Quinton Immelman

22 September 2012	Falcons	52 – 52	Boland Cavaliers	Barnard Stadium, Kempton Park
15:00	Try: Karlo Aspeling 7'; Hendrik Meyer 17', 39'; Fred Eksteen 35'; Jaun Kotzé 45'; Bruce Muller 51'; Sandile Ngcobo 63'; Baksteen van Heerden 83'; Con: Karlo Aspeling 8', 18' (2/2); Jaun Kotzé 36', 40', 51', 63' (4/6); Pen: Karlo Aspeling (0/1)	Scoreboard	Try: Elgar Watts 19'; Eric Zana 23'; Vainon Willis 27', 33'; Jacquin Jansen 32'; Brendon April 42'; Juwell Samuels 58'; Siviwe Magaba 72'; Con: Elgar Watts 20', 28', 32', 42', 59', 73' (6/8); Pen: Elgar Watts (0/1)	Attendance: 800; Referee: Marius Jonker

22 September 2012	Griffons	50 – 49	SWD Eagles	North West Stadium, Welkom
15:00	Try: Nicky Steyn 7'; Hansie Graaff 24'; Japie Nel 32', 75'; Shane Hancke 37'; Sarel Louw 47'; Werner Griesel 68'; Con: Hansie Graaff 8', 25', 33', 37', 48', 76' (6/7); Pen: Hansie Graaff 5' (1/2)	Scoreboard	Try: Ghafoer Luckan 19', 27', 44'; Elric van Vuuren 30'; Alshaun Bock 39'; Stokkies Hanekom 52'; Dumisani Meslane 59'; Mzo Dyantyi 66'; Con: Elric van Vuuren 40', 53' (2/6); Burton Francis 60' (1/2); Pen: Burton Francis 74' (1/1)	Attendance: 2,200; Referee: Tiaan Jonker

==== Round Fourteen ====
28 September 2012	Boland Cavaliers	43 – 24	Border Bulldogs	Boland Stadium, Wellington
16:00	Try: Johnathan Francke 1'; Brendon April 9', 35'; Franzel September 17'; Elgar Watts 42'; Jacquin Jansen 65'; Bjorgen Julies 69'; Con: Elgar Watts 2', 10', 36', 43' (4/7); Cards: Franzel September (yellow card) 38' to 48'	Scoreboard	Try: Blake Kyd 32'; Joe Seerane 50'; Dean Muir 62'; Chrislyn van Schalkwyk 78'; Con: Reinhardt Gerber 33' (1/2); Quinton Crocker (0/1); Jannie Myburgh 79' (1/1); Pen: Reinhardt Gerber (0/1)	Attendance: 800; Referee: Quinton Immelman

28 September 2012	Pumas	29 – 39	Griffons	Puma Stadium, Witbank
17:00	Try: Ashwin Scott 8'; Faf de Klerk 27'; Renaldo Bothma 37'; Shaun Venter 64'; Con: Naas Olivier 28', 38', 65' (3/4); Pen: Naas Olivier 22' (1/1)	Scoreboard	Try: Shane Hancke 16'; Inus Kritzinger 32'; Cameron Jacobs 40'; Hansie Graaff 50'; Gavin Annandale 75'; Con: Hansie Graaff 17', 33', 41', 51' (4/5); Pen: Hansie Graaff 19' (1/2); Drop: Hansie Graaff 20' (1/1)	Attendance: 1,350; Referee: Sindile Mayende

28 September 2012	SWD Eagles	45 – 11	Falcons	Outeniqua Park, George
17:05	Try: Elric van Vuuren 28', 42'; Dumisani Meslane 39'; Alshaun Bock 48'; Wilhelm Koch 61'; Ghafoer Luckan 71'; Shaun Raubenheimer 73'; Con: Elric van Vuuren 40', 43', 49', 62', 72' (5/7)	Scoreboard	Try: Bovril de Bruin 54'; Con: Karlo Aspeling (0/1); Pen: Karlo Aspeling 3', 19' (2/3); Drop: Karlo Aspeling (0/1); Cards: Wesley Kotzé (yellow card) 26' to 38'; Fred Eksteen (yellow card) 39' to 48'	Attendance: 500; Referee: Joey Salmans

28 September 2012	Leopards	20 – 23	Eastern Province Kings	Olën Park, Potchefstroom
19:00	Try: Edgar Marutlulle 24' penalty try 66'; Con: André Pretorius 25', 66' (2/2); Pen: André Pretorius 20', 36' (2/3)	Scoreboard	Try: Wesley Dunlop 33'; Wimpie van der Walt 47'; Con: Wesley Dunlop 34', 48' (2/2); Pen: Wesley Dunlop 28', 32', 42' (3/4); Cards: Darron Nell (yellow card) 66' to 76'	Attendance: 500; Referee: Tiaan Jonker

=== Title Play-Off Games ===
==== Semi-finals ====
5 October 2012	Pumas	37 – 30	Griffons	Mbombela Stadium, Mbombela
16:30	Try: Shaun Venter 5'; Coenie van Wyk 7'; Jaco Bouwer 26'; Carl Bezuidenhout 48'; JW Jonker 63'; Con: JC Roos 6', 8', 64' (3/5); Pen: JC Roos 34', 42' (2/2); Cards: Coenie van Wyk (yellow card) 39' to 50'	Scoreboard	Try: Inus Kritzinger 37'; Shane Hancke 51'; Rudi Britz 80'; Con: Hansie Graaff 38', 51', 81' (3/3); Pen: Hansie Graaff 13', 20', 30' (3/5)	Attendance: 13,623; Referee: Sindile Mayende

5 October 2012	Eastern Province Kings	50 – 27	Leopards	Nelson Mandela Bay Stadium, Port Elizabeth
19:10	Try: Paul Perez 7', 38', 67'; Luke Watson 17'; Schalk Ferreira 46'; Marcello Sampson 71'; SP Marais 80'; Con: George Whitehead 18', 47' (2/6); Wesley Dunlop 81' (1/1); Pen: George Whitehead 5', 61' (2/2); Wesley Dunlop 79' (1/1)	Scoreboard	Try: BG Uys 30'; Edgar Marutlulle 44'; Allister Kettledas 75'; Con: André Pretorius 31', 45', 76' (3/3); Pen: André Pretorius 49' (1/2); Drop: André Pretorius 22' (1/1)	Attendance: 17,372; Referee: Rasta Rasivhenge

==== Final ====
13 October 2012	Eastern Province Kings	26 – 25	Pumas	Nelson Mandela Bay Stadium, Port Elizabeth
14:30	Try: Darron Nell 38'; Marcello Sampson 67'; Con: George Whitehead 39' (1/1); Wesley Dunlop 68' (1/1); Pen: George Whitehead 5', 43', 49' (3/4); Wesley Dunlop 75' (1/1)	Scoreboard	Try: RW Kember 16'; Coenie van Wyk 23', 79'; Jaco Bouwer 72'; Con: JC Roos (0/2); Naas Olivier 79' (1/2); Pen: JC Roos 2' (1/3); Drop: JC Roos (0/1)	Attendance: 23,527; Referee: Jason Jaftha

2012 Absa Currie Cup
First Division Champions
Eastern Province Kings
Second title

== Promotion/Relegation Games ==
=== Tables ===
2012 Currie Cup Promotion Relegation Games Table
Pos	Team	Pld	W	D	L	PF	PA	PD	TF	TA	TB	LB	Pts
1	Free State Cheetahs (P)	2	2	0	0	69	20	+49	9	2	1	0	9
2	Eastern Province Kings (F)	2	0	0	2	20	69	−49	2	9	0	0	0

Rules for classification: 4 points for a win; 2 points for a draw; 1 bonus point for a loss by seven points or less; 1 bonus point for scoring four or more tries in a match
(F) Qualified for the 2013 Currie Cup First Division; (P) Qualified for the 2013 Currie Cup Premier Division

=== Results ===
19 October 2012	Free State Cheetahs	53 – 14	Eastern Province Kings	Free State Stadium, Bloemfontein
19:10	Try: Nico Scheepers 5' m Ross Geldenhuys 12' m Philip van der Walt 26' c Andries Strauss (2) 30' c, 50' m Adriaan Strauss 56' c Rayno Benjamin 66' c Penalty try 75' c Con: Nico Scheepers (2/4) 27', 31'; Tewis de Bruyn (3/3) 57', 67', 76'; Pen: Tewis de Bruyn (1/1) 62'	Scoreboard	Try: Devin Oosthuizen 47' c Shane Gates 54' c Con: George Whitehead (2/2) 47', 55'; Cards: Charl du Plessis (yellow card) 75' to 80'	Attendance: 24,167; Referee: Jonathan Kaplan

26 October 2012	Eastern Province Kings	6 – 16	Free State Cheetahs	Nelson Mandela Bay Stadium, Port Elizabeth
19:00	Pen: George Whitehead (2/2) 5', 12'; Cards: Falie Oelschig (red card) 32'	Scoreboard	Try: Sias Ebersohn 63' c Con: Nico Scheepers (1/1) 64'; Pen: Nico Scheepers (3/3) 62', 72', 78'	Attendance: 24,948; Referee: Craig Joubert

- Free State Cheetahs remain in the Premier Division for 2013.
- Eastern Province Kings remain in the First Division for 2013.

== Players ==
=== Player statistics ===
==== Leading try scorers ====
Top 10 try scorers
Pos	Name	Team	Tries
1	Allister Kettledas	Leopards	14
2	Luke Watson	Eastern Province Kings	12
3	JW Jonker	Pumas	11
4	JW Bell	Falcons	9
4	Jaco Bouwer	Pumas	9
4	Cornell du Preez	Eastern Province Kings	9
7	Brendon April	Boland Cavaliers	8
7	Johan Herbst	SWD Eagles	8
7	Elric van Vuuren	SWD Eagles	8
10	Alshaun Bock	SWD Eagles	7
10	Danie Dames	Leopards	7
10	Stompie de Wet	Leopards	7
10	Shane Hancke	Griffons	7
10	Franzel September	Boland Cavaliers	7
10	Elgar Watts	Boland Cavaliers	7

Source: South African Rugby Union

==== Leading point scorers ====
Top 10 overall point scorers
Pos	Name	Team	Points
1	André Pretorius	Leopards	166
2	JC Roos	Pumas	162
3	George Whitehead	Eastern Province Kings	142
4	Hansie Graaff	Griffons	134
5	Elric van Vuuren	SWD Eagles	133
6	Elgar Watts	Boland Cavaliers	115
7	Wesley Dunlop	Eastern Province Kings	114
8	Karlo Aspeling	Falcons	106
9	Jacquin Jansen	Boland Cavaliers	76
10	Allister Kettledas	Leopards	70

Source: South African Rugby Union

== See also ==
- 2012 Currie Cup Premier Division
- 2012 Vodacom Cup
- 2012 Under-21 Provincial Championship
- 2012 Under-19 Provincial Championship
