= 2012 Vodacom Cup =

- Champions: Western Province
- Runners-up: Griquas
- Matches played: 56
- Tries scored: 400 (average 7.1 per match)
- Top point scorer: Gouws Prinsloo (134)
- Top try scorer: Jaco Bouwer; Rohan Kitshoff (7)

The 2012 Vodacom Cup was played between 10 March and 18 May 2012 and was the 15th edition of this annual domestic cup competition. The Vodacom Cup is played between rugby union teams in South Africa from the Currie Cup Premier and First Divisions, as well as an invitational team, the Pampas XV from Argentina.

== Competition ==
There were fifteen teams participating in the 2012 Vodacom Cup competition. These teams were geographically divided into two sections - the Northern Section (with seven teams) and the Southern Section (with eight teams). Teams played all the teams in their section once over the course of the season, either at home or away.

Teams received four log points for a win and two points for a draw. Bonus log points were awarded to teams that scored four or more tries in a game, as well as to teams that lost a match by seven points or less. Teams were ranked by log points, then points difference (points scored less points conceded).

The top four teams in each section qualified for the title play-offs. In the quarter-finals, the teams that finished first in each section had home advantage against the teams that finished fourth in that section and the teams that finished second in each section had home advantage against the teams that finished third in that section. The winners of these quarter finals then played each other in the semi-finals, with the higher placed team having home advantage. The two semi-final winners then met in the final.

== Teams ==
Location of teams in 2012 Vodacom Cup
Northern Section
Southern Section

=== Changes from 2011 ===
The Welwitschias from Namibia withdrew due to financial constraints.

=== Team listing ===
The following teams took part in the 2012 Vodacom Cup competition:

Northern Section
| Team | Sponsored Name | Stadium/s | Sponsored Name |
| Blue Bulls | Vodacom Blue Bulls | Loftus Versfeld, Pretoria | Loftus Versfeld |
| Falcons | Falcons | Barnard Stadium, Kempton Park | Barnard Stadium |
| Griffons | Griffons | North West Stadium, Welkom | North West Stadium |
| Griquas | GWK Griquas | Griqua Park, Kimberley | GWK Park |
| Golden Lions | MTN Golden Lions | Ellis Park Stadium, Johannesburg | Coca-Cola Stadium |
| Leopards | Leopards | Olën Park, Potchefstroom | Profert Olën Park |
| Pumas | Ford Pumas | Mbombela Stadium, Mbombela | Mbombela Stadium |
| Pumas | Ford Pumas | Puma Stadium, Witbank | Puma Stadium |

Southern Section
| Team | Sponsored Name | Stadium/s | Sponsored Name |
| Boland Cavaliers | Regent Boland Cavaliers | Boland Stadium, Wellington | Boland Stadium |
| Boland Cavaliers | Regent Boland Cavaliers | Glaskasteel, Bredasdorp | Glaskasteel |
| Border Bulldogs | Border Bulldogs | Buffalo City Stadium, East London | Buffalo City Stadium |
| Border Bulldogs | Border Bulldogs | Mlungisi Rugby Field, Queenstown | Mlungisi Rugby Field |
| Eastern Province Kings | Eastern Province Kings | Nelson Mandela Bay Stadium, Port Elizabeth | Nelson Mandela Bay Stadium |
| Free State XV | Toyota Free State XV | Free State Stadium, Bloemfontein | Free State Stadium |
| Free State XV | Toyota Free State XV | Clive Solomon Stadium, Heidedal | Clive Solomon Stadium |
| Pampas XV (Argentina) | Standard Bank Pampas XV | A.F. Markötter Stadium, Stellenbosch | A.F. Markötter Stadium |
| Sharks XV | Sharks XV | Kings Park Stadium, Durban | Mr Price Kings Park |
| SWD Eagles | SWD Eagles | Outeniqua Park, George | Outeniqua Park |
| SWD Eagles | SWD Eagles | Bridgton Sports Grounds, Oudtshoorn | Bridgton Sports Grounds |
| SWD Eagles | SWD Eagles | D'Almeida Stadium, Mossel Bay | D'Almeida Stadium |
| Western Province | DHL Western Province | Newlands Stadium, Cape Town | DHL Newlands |
| Western Province | DHL Western Province | City Park Stadium, Athlone | City Park Stadium |
| Western Province | DHL Western Province | Danie Craven Stadium, Stellenbosch | Danie Craven Stadium |
| Western Province | DHL Western Province | Durbanville Rugby Club, Durbanville | Durbanville Rugby Club |

== Tables ==
=== Northern Section ===
2012 Vodacom Cup Northern Section Table
| Pos | Team | Pld | W | D | L | PF | PA | PD | TF | TA | TB | LB | Pts | Qualification |
|---|---|---|---|---|---|---|---|---|---|---|---|---|---|---|
| 1 | Griquas | 6 | 5 | 0 | 1 | 267 | 125 | +142 | 35 | 12 | 4 | 1 | 25 | Qualified for the Quarter Finals |
| 2 | Pumas | 6 | 4 | 1 | 1 | 220 | 125 | +95 | 26 | 12 | 4 | 1 | 23 | Qualified for the Quarter Finals |
| 3 | Blue Bulls | 6 | 4 | 1 | 1 | 212 | 116 | +96 | 27 | 15 | 3 | 0 | 21 | Qualified for the Quarter Finals |
| 4 | Golden Lions | 6 | 3 | 0 | 3 | 224 | 193 | +31 | 29 | 21 | 3 | 2 | 17 | Qualified for the Quarter Finals |
| 5 | Leopards | 6 | 2 | 0 | 4 | 146 | 182 | −36 | 17 | 24 | 2 | 2 | 12 | |
| 6 | Falcons | 6 | 1 | 0 | 5 | 134 | 312 | −178 | 17 | 44 | 2 | 1 | 7 | |
| 7 | Griffons | 6 | 1 | 0 | 5 | 132 | 282 | −150 | 18 | 41 | 2 | 0 | 6 | |

Rules for classification:
- 4 points for a win
- 2 points for a draw
- 1 bonus point for a loss by seven points or less
- 1 bonus point for scoring four or more tries in a match

=== Southern Section ===
2012 Vodacom Cup Southern Section Table
| Pos | Team | Pld | W | D | L | PF | PA | PD | TF | TA | TB | LB | Pts | Qualification |
|---|---|---|---|---|---|---|---|---|---|---|---|---|---|---|
| 1 | Western Province | 7 | 7 | 0 | 0 | 220 | 130 | +90 | 24 | 11 | 4 | 0 | 32 | Qualified for the Quarter Finals |
| 2 | Sharks XV | 7 | 5 | 0 | 2 | 223 | 138 | +85 | 25 | 14 | 4 | 2 | 26 | Qualified for the Quarter Finals |
| 3 | Eastern Province Kings | 7 | 5 | 0 | 2 | 209 | 178 | +31 | 21 | 17 | 3 | 1 | 24 | Qualified for the Quarter Finals |
| 4 | Pampas XV | 7 | 4 | 0 | 3 | 216 | 181 | +35 | 23 | 20 | 3 | 2 | 21 | Qualified for the Quarter Finals |
| 5 | Boland Cavaliers | 7 | 4 | 0 | 3 | 217 | 225 | −8 | 27 | 25 | 3 | 2 | 21 | |
| 6 | Free State XV | 7 | 2 | 0 | 5 | 211 | 259 | −48 | 28 | 29 | 5 | 1 | 14 | |
| 7 | Border Bulldogs | 7 | 1 | 0 | 6 | 165 | 271 | −106 | 17 | 38 | 2 | 1 | 7 | |
| 8 | SWD Eagles | 7 | 0 | 0 | 7 | 176 | 255 | −79 | 23 | 34 | 3 | 3 | 6 | |

Rules for classification:
- 4 points for a win
- 2 points for a draw
- 1 bonus point for a loss by seven points or less
- 1 bonus point for scoring four or more tries in a match

== Fixtures and results ==
=== Northern Section ===
==== Round one ====
| 10 March 2012 | Leopards | 23–16 | Golden Lions | Olën Park, Potchefstroom |
| 14:45 | Try: Hoffmann Maritz 10'; Wian Fourie 72'; Berty Visser 81'; Con: André Pretorius (0/1); George Tossel 73' (1/2); Pen: André Pretorius 24' (1/4); Danie Dames (0/1); George Tossel 67' (1/1); Drop: André Pretorius (0/1) | Scoreboard | Try: Marais Schmidt 42'; Con: Marais Schmidt 43' (1/1); Pen: Marais Schmidt 2', 13', 48' (3/5) | Referee: Sindile Mayende |

| 10 March 2012 | Falcons | 30–55 | Pumas | Barnard Stadium, Kempton Park |
| 15:00 | Try: Bovril de Bruin 18'; Willie Odendaal 25'; Coert Cronje 28'; Con: Jaun Kotzé 19', 26', 29' (3/3); Pen: Jaun Kotzé 6', 49', 64' (3/3); Arno Poley (0/1) | Scoreboard | Try: Wilhelm Loock 2', 47'; Coenie van Wyk 12', 73'; Dewald Pretorius 31'; JW Jonker 33'; Renaldo Bothma 42'; Faf de Klerk 80'; Con: JC Roos 3', 13', 32', 43', 48', 80' (6/8); Pen: JC Roos 22' (1/1) | Referee: Ben Crouse |

| 10 March 2012 | Blue Bulls | 17–36 | Griquas | Loftus Versfeld, Pretoria |
| 16:45 | Try: Clayton Blommetjies 39'; Sampie Mastriet 65'; Con: Wesley Dunlop 40' (1/1); Jurgen Visser 66' (1/1); Pen: Jurgen Visser 11' (1/1); Wesley Dunlop (0/1) | Scoreboard | Try: Jannie Boshoff 2', 48'; Matthew Rosslee 5'; Jacques Coetzee 22'; Ligtoring Landman 59'; Rudi Vogt 76'; Con: Marnitz Boshoff 6', 23', 60' (3/6); Pen: Marnitz Boshoff (0/3); Drop: Marnitz Boshoff (0/2) | Attendance: 5,500; Referee: Lourens van der Merwe |

Bye/s: Griffons

==== Round two ====
| 17 March 2012 | Griquas | 55–10 | Griffons | Griqua Park, Kimberley |
| 15:00 | Try: Wilmaure Louw 18'; Jacques Coetzee 25'; Leon Karemaker 34'; PJ Vermeulen 43'; Matt Rosslee 62'; Jannie Boshoff 70'; Lolo Waka 78'; Marnus Schoeman 80'; Con: Marnitz Boshoff (0/1); Rudi Vogt 26', 44', 63', 71', 79', 81' (6/7); Pen: Marnitz Boshoff 15' (1/2); Cards: Marnus Schoeman (yellow card) 57' to 68' | Scoreboard | Try: Martin Sithole 37'; Con: Tiaan van Wyk 38' (1/1); Pen: Tiaan van Wyk 5' (1/1); Cards: Jaco Meyer (yellow card) 75' | Attendance: 1,000; Referee: Pro Legoete |

| 17 March 2012 | Pumas | 19–19 | Blue Bulls | Mbombela Stadium, Mbombela |
| 16:00 | Try: Renaldo Bothma 45'; Con: JC Roos 46' (1/1); Pen: JC Roos 22', 31', 48', 72' (4/7); Cards: Jaco Bouwer (yellow card) 23' to 33' | Scoreboard | Try: Warwick Tecklenburg 3'; Con: Wesley Dunlop 4' (1/1); Pen: Wesley Dunlop 8', 28', 42', 60' (4/5); Jurgen Visser (0/2); Cards: Jono Ross (yellow card) 36' to 46' | Attendance: 2,750; Referee: Marius van der Westhuizen |

| 17 March 2012 | Golden Lions | 59–29 | Falcons | Wits Rugby Stadium, Johannesburg |
| 17:00 | Try: Andries Coetzee 20'; Paul Willemse 26'; Ruan Combrinck 30', 44'; Michael Killian 47'; Anthony Volmink 59', 81'; Stephan de Wit 59'; François du Toit 75'; Con: Andries Coetzee 21', 26', 31', 47', 60' (5/7); Marais Schmidt 76', 81' (2/2) | Scoreboard | Try: Kyle Hendricks 6'; Jaun Kotzé 22'; Jaco Snyman 72'; Con: Jaun Kotzé 7' (1/3); Pen: Jaun Kotzé 2', 29', 38', 56' (4/4); Drop: Arno Poley (0/1) | Attendance: 200; Referee: Ben Crouse |

Bye/s: Leopards

==== Round three ====
| 23 March 2012 | Falcons | 31–28 | Leopards | Barnard Stadium, Kempton Park |
| 15:00 | Try: Marco Kotze 22'; Bradley Fortuin 39'; Kyle Hendricks 49'; Sino Ganto 58'; Anrich Richter 79'; Con: Jaun Kotzé 23', 50', 59' (3/5); Pen: Arno Poley (0/1); Jaun Kotzé (0/2); Cards: Zane Kilian (yellow card) 46' to 56' | Scoreboard | Try: Adriaan Engelbrecht 25', 52', 62'; Berty Visser 31'; Con: André Pretorius 26', 32', 53', 63' (4/4); Pen: André Pretorius (0/2); Wilco de Wet (0/1); Cards: BW van Dyk (yellow card) 46' to 56' | Attendance: 1,000; Referee: Tiaan Jonker |

| 23 March 2012 | Griffons | 12–43 | Pumas | North West Stadium, Welkom |
| 19:00 | Try: Nicky Steyn 21', 67'; Con: Tiaan van Wyk (0/1); Reinhardt Erwee 68' (1/1); Pen: Tiaan van Wyk (0/1); Cards: Tertius Carse (yellow card) 70' | Scoreboard | Try: Coenie van Wyk 9'; Deon Scholtz 25'; Jaco Bouwer 31', 64'; Wilhelm Loock 71'; JW Jonker 75'; Con: JC Roos 10', 32', 65', 72', 76' (5/6); Pen: JC Roos 4' (1/1); Drop: JC Roos (0/1) | Attendance: 1,000; Referee: Archie Sehlako |

| 24 March 2012 | Blue Bulls | 49–10 | Golden Lions | Loftus Versfeld, Pretoria |
| 14:45 | Try: Ruan Snyman 18'; Tony Jantjies 30'; Jurgen Visser 46'; Ulrich Beyers 54'; Vincent Koch 74'; Basil Short 76'; Con: Tony Jantjies 31', 47', 55', 75', 77' (5/6); Pen: Tony Jantjies 9', 12', 53' (3/3); Cards: Ulrich Beyers (yellow card) 66' to 76' | Scoreboard | Try: Anthony Volmink 58'; Con: Marais Schmidt 59' (1/1); Pen: Marais Schmidt 7' (1/1) | Referee: Quinton Immelman |

Bye/s: Griquas

==== Round four ====
| 31 March 2012 | Golden Lions | 71–25 | Griffons | Coca-Cola Park, Johannesburg |
| 14:45 | Try: Robert de Bruyn 7'; Bradley Moolman 13', 27', 40'; Paul Willemse 44'; Ruan Dreyer 51'; Etienne Oosthuizen 64'; Anthony Volmink 66', 73'; JR Esterhuizen 78', 80'; Con: Marais Schmidt 8', 40', 45', 52', 65', 67' (6/8); Guy Cronje 74', 81' (2/3) | Scoreboard | Try: Japie Nel 48'; Virgil Russel 60'; Martin Sithole 75'; Con: Tiaan van Wyk 61', 76' (2/3); Pen: Reinhardt Erwee 4', 35' (2/3) | Attendance: 5,000; Referee: Ben Crouse |

| 31 March 2012 | Leopards | 15–28 | Blue Bulls | Olën Park, Potchefstroom |
| 16:00 | Try: Joubert Engelbrecht 27'; Johann Laker 80'; Con: André Pretorius 81' (1/2); Pen: André Pretorius 11' (1/3); Adriaan Engelbrecht (0/1) | Scoreboard | Try: Jono Ross 14'; Sampie Mastriet 38'; Jan Serfontein 70'; Con: Tony Jantjies 15', 39' (2/2); Wesley Dunlop 71' (1/1); Pen: Tony Jantjies 4', 17', 64' (3/5) | Attendance: 700; Referee: Pro Legoete |

| 31 March 2012 | Pumas | 20–21 | Griquas | Puma Stadium, Witbank |
| 16:00 | Try: Deon Scholtz 52'; Con: JC Roos (0/1); Pen: JC Roos 6', 8', 22', 26', 58' (5/6); Tiaan Marx (0/1) | Scoreboard | Try: Jean Stemmet 20'; Marnus Schoeman 50'; Con: Rudi Vogt 51' (1/1); Pen: Rudi Vogt 15', 40', 69' (3/4) | Referee: Rasta Rasivhenge |

Bye/s: Falcons

==== Round Five ====
| 13 April 2012 | Blue Bulls | 49 – 8 | Falcons | Loftus Versfeld, Pretoria |
| 16:00 | Try: Jurgen Visser 6', 15', 34'; Clayton Blommetjies 25'; Robbie Coetzee 27'; Willie du Plessis 45'; Sampie Mastriet 53'; Con: Wesley Dunlop 7', 16', 26', 31', 35', 46', 54' (7/7) | Scoreboard | Try: JW Bell 58'; Con: Anrich Richter (0/1); Pen: Jaun Kotzé 19' (1/1); Cards: Bradley Fortuin (yellow card) 50' | Referee: Rasta Rasivhenge |

| 13 April 2012 | Griffons | 19 – 30 | Leopards | North West Stadium, Welkom |
| 19:00 | Try: Tertius Carse 7'; Nicky Steyn 12', 76'; Con: Reinhardt Erwee 8', 13' (2/2); Hansie Graaff (0/1); Cards: Thabang Molefe (yellow card) 63' to 73' | Scoreboard | Try: Joubert Engelbrecht 2', 48'; Berty Visser 27'; Con: André Pretorius 3', 28' (2/2); Gerhard Nortier 49' (1/1); Pen: André Pretorius 23', 31', 37' (3/3); Cards: Gerhard Nortier (yellow card) 80' | Referee: Lourens van der Merwe |

| 14 April 2012 | Griquas | 30 – 35 | Golden Lions | Griqua Park, Kimberley |
| 15:00 | Try: Ligtoring Landman 16'; Jannie Boshoff 41'; Con: Rudi Vogt 42' (1/2); Pen: Rudi Vogt 11', 22', 28', 40', 60', 66' (6/6) | Scoreboard | Try: Anthony Volmink 24'; Jaco Kriel 45'; Robert de Bruyn 53'; Garth April 67'; Con: Guy Cronjé 46', 54', 68' (3/4); Pen: Ruan Combrinck (0/1); Guy Cronjé 20', 52', 63' (3/3) | Referee: Jaco Peyper |

Bye/s: Pumas

==== Round Six ====
| 20 April 2012 | Falcons | 33 – 38 | Griffons | Barnard Stadium, Kempton Park |
| 15:00 | Try: Wikus Coetzer 15'; Coert Cronje 22', 52'; Willie Odendaal 64'; Jaun Kotzé 75'; Con: Jaun Kotzé 16', 23', 53', 76' (4/5); Cards: JW Bell (yellow card) 39' to 49' | Scoreboard | Try: Danie van der Merwe 1'; Thabang Molefe 24'; Willie Britz 40'; Shane Hancke 45'; Tertius Maarman 58'; Con: Reinhardt Erwee 59', 2', 25', 40', 46' (5/5); Pen: Reinhardt Erwee 69' (1/1) | Attendance: 1,000; Referee: Stuart Berry |

| 21 April 2012 | Leopards | 40 – 42 | Griquas | Olën Park, Potchefstroom |
| 16:00 | Try: Hoffmann Maritz 11'; HP Swart 24'; Berty Visser 36'; Adriaan Engelbrecht 69'; Con: André Pretorius 12', 25', 37', 70' (4/4); Pen: André Pretorius 7', 48', 65' (3/5); Drop: André Pretorius 15' (1/2) | Scoreboard | Try: Marnus Schoeman 18'; Ligtoring Landman 32', 75'; Jean Stemmet 42'; PJ Vermeulen 45'; Jonathan Adendorf 61'; Con: Rudi Vogt 33', 46', 76' (3/6); Pen: Rudi Vogt 56', 67' (2/2); Drop: Francois Brummer (0/1) | Attendance: 1,000; Referee: Tiaan Jonker |

| 21 April 2012 | Golden Lions | 33 – 37 | Pumas | Coca-Cola Park, Johannesburg |
| 17:00 | Try: Hendrik Roodt 7'; Bradley Moolman 34'; Ruan Combrinck 69'; Con: Guy Cronje 8', 35', 70' (3/3); Pen: Guy Cronje 14', 19', 49', 54' (4/5) | Scoreboard | Try: Jaco Bouwer 4'; Deon Scholtz 36'; Torsten van Jaarsveld 45'; Renaldo Bothma 66'; Con: Coenie van Wyk 5', 37', 46', 67' (4/4); Pen: Coenie van Wyk 32', 61', 72' (3/3) | Attendance: 300; Referee: Ben Crouse |

Bye/s: Blue Bulls

==== Round Seven ====
| 26 April 2012 | Griquas | 83 – 3 | Falcons | Griqua Park, Kimberley |
| 15:30 | Try: Marnus Schoeman 6', 44'; Leon Karemaker 16', 66'; Jacques Coetzee 19'; Jean Stemmet 23'; Janro van Niekerk 30'; Rudi Vogt 35'; Simon Westraadt 52'; Marnus Hugo 73'; Rocco Jansen 75'; Con: Rudi Vogt 7', 17', 20', 24', 31', 36', 45' (7/7); Marnitz Boshoff 53', 67', 74', 76' (4/4); Pen: Rudi Vogt 2', 4' (2/2) | Scoreboard | Pen: Jaun Kotzé 14' (1/1) | Referee: Lourens van der Merwe |

| 27 April 2012 | Griffons | 28 – 50 | Blue Bulls | North West Stadium, Welkom |
| 15:00 | Try: Nicky Steyn 29'; Hansie Graaff 48'; Japie Nel 59'; Danie van der Merwe 74'; Con: Hansie Graaff 30', 49', 60', 75' (4/4) | Scoreboard | Try: Jean Cook 2'; Courtnall Skosan 17'; Jan Serfontein 26'; Ulrich Beyers 32'; Willie du Plessis 45'; Sampie Mastriet 66'; Jerome Pretorius 69'; Franco Mostert 79'; Con: Wesley Dunlop 3', 18', 27', 33' (4/4); Willie du Plessis 70' (1/3); Ulrich Beyers (0/1); Cards: Warwick Tecklenburg (yellow card) 58' to 70' | Referee: Lourens van der Merwe |

| 28 April 2012 | Pumas | 46 – 10 | Leopards | Puma Stadium, Witbank |
| 19:10 | Try: Jaco Bouwer 3', 61'; Coenie van Wyk 24', 38', 57'; Johan Jackson 78'; Con: JC Roos 4', 39', 58', 62', 79' (5/6); Pen: JC Roos 29', 49' (2/3) | Scoreboard | Try: Juan Pretorius 74'; Con: Gerhard Nortier 75' (1/1); Pen: André Pretorius 8' (1/1) | Attendance: 250; Referee: Ben Crouse |

Bye/s: Golden Lions

=== Southern Section ===
==== Round one ====
| 9 March 2012 | Pampas XV | 26–34 | Eastern Province Kings | A.F. Markötter Stadium, Stellenbosch |
| 15:10 | Try: Ramiro Moyano 2'; Lisandro Gomez Lopez 16'; Con: Santiago González Iglesias 3', 17' (2/2); Pen: Santiago González Iglesias 15', 24', 46', 69' (4/4); Cards: Nahuel Lobo (yellow card) 66' to 75' | Scoreboard | Try: Jacques Engelbrecht 20'; Shane Gates 39'; Boetie Britz 55', 67'; Con: Falie Oelschig 40' (1/4); Pen: Falie Oelschig 12', 30', 33', 48' (4/6); Scott van Breda (0/1) | Attendance: 500; Referee: Stuart Berry |

| 9 March 2012 | Border Bulldogs | 0–42 | Sharks XV | Buffalo City Stadium, East London |
| 19:00 | Pen: Louis Kruger (0/2) | Scoreboard | Try: Gouws Prinsloo 27'; Tera Mtembu 33'; Pieter-Steph du Toit 40'; Brynard Stander 52'; Jandre Marais 63', 71'; Con: Gouws Prinsloo 28', 34', 41', 53', 64', 72' (6/6); Pen: Gouws Prinsloo (0/2); Cards: Marius Joubert (yellow card) 57' to 67' | Attendance: 3,000; Referee: Jonathan Kaplan |

| 10 March 2012 | Free State XV | 34–30 | SWD Eagles | Clive Solomon Stadium, Heidedal |
| 15:00 | Try: Barry Geel 30'; Ockie van Zyl 32'; Philip Burger 68', 79'; Sethu Tom 77'; Con: Marco Mason 33', 69' (2/3); Philip Burger 80' (1/2); Pen: Marco Mason 41' (1/4) | Scoreboard | Try: Wentsley Scott 17'; Grant le Roux 27'; Elric van Vuuren 74'; Con: Elric van Vuuren 18', 28', 75' (3/3); Pen: Elric van Vuuren 3', 62', 64' (3/3) | Attendance: 3,000; Referee: Marius van der Westhuizen |

| 10 March 2012 | Western Province | 51–22 | Boland Cavaliers | Newlands Stadium, Cape Town |
| 16:00 | Try: Michael Ledwidge 5'; Ederies Arendse 16'; Reuben Johannes 34'; Michael van der Spuy 78'; Pieter Stemmet 81'; Con: Demetri Catrakilis 6', 17', 82' (3/4); Kurt Coleman 79' (1/1); Pen: Demetri Catrakilis 29', 32', 39', 52', 62', 66' (6/6); Cards: Demetri Catrakilis (yellow card) 70' to 80' | Scoreboard | Try: Franzel September 20'; Con: Ricardo Croy 21' (1/1); Pen: Ricardo Croy 8', 15', 24', 26', 43' (5/7); Cards: Neil Papier (yellow card) 76' | Attendance: 1,000; Referee: Rasta Rasivhenge |

==== Round two ====
| 16 March 2012 | Eastern Province Kings | 40–23 | Border Bulldogs | Nelson Mandela Bay Stadium, Port Elizabeth |
| 19:00 | Try: Hannes Franklin 32'; Scott van Breda 36'; Danie Faasen 68'; Kieran Goss 76'; Con: Falie Oelschig 33', 37' (2/2); Justin van Staden 69', 77' (2/2); Pen: Falie Oelschig 10', 12' (2/3); Justin van Staden 60', 65' (2/3); Cards: Shane Gates (red card) 47' | Scoreboard | Try: Clinton Koen 71'; Con: Dale Sabbagh (0/1); Pen: Ntabeni Dukisa 16', 26', 34', 39', 47' (5/7); Logan Basson 28' (1/1) | Attendance: 2,000; Referee: Quinton Immelman |

| 17 March 2012 | Sharks XV | 15–17 | Western Province | Kings Park Stadium, Durban |
| 14:45 | Pen: Gouws Prinsloo 8', 51', 58', 64', 76' (5/7); Drop: Fred Zeilinga (0/1) | Scoreboard | Try: Reuben Johannes 55'; Con: Demetri Catrakilis (0/1); Pen: Demetri Catrakilis 12', 39', 61' (3/3); Drop: Demetri Catrakilis 42' (1/1) | Attendance: 500; Referee: Lusanda Menze |

| 17 March 2012 | Boland Cavaliers | 32–30 | Free State XV | Glaskasteel, Bredasdorp |
| 16:00 | Try: Johnathan Francke 6'; Jacquin Jansen 42', 54'; Zandré Jordaan 72'; Con: Elgar Watts 7', 43', 55' (3/4); Pen: Elgar Watts 34' (1/1); Jacquin Jansen 80' (1/1); Cards: Johnathan Francke (yellow card) 51' to 61' | Scoreboard | Try: Ockie van Zyl 24'; Marcel Van Der Merwe 46'; Kholo Ramashala 49'; Michael van Vuuren 68'; Con: Marco Mason 25', 49' (2/4); Pen: Marco Mason 16', 75' (2/3) | Attendance: 3,200; Referee: Marius Jonker |

| 17 March 2012 | Pampas XV | 34–30 | SWD Eagles | A.F. Markötter Stadium, Stellenbosch |
| 16:00 | Try: Tomás Leonardi 3'; Benjamín Madero 20'; Tomás Cubelli 59'; Ramiro Moyano 72'; Facundo Barrea 75'; Con: Benjamín Madero 21' (1/2); Santiago González Iglesias 60', 75' (2/3); Pen: Benjamín Madero 44' (1/3) | Scoreboard | Try: Elric van Vuuren 1'; Alshaun Bock 47', 55'; Grant le Roux 78'; Con: Elric van Vuuren 1', 48' (2/3); Alshaun Bock (0/1); Pen: Elric van Vuuren 31', 38' (2/3) | Referee: Rasta Rasivhenge |

==== Round three ====
| 23 March 2012 | Border Bulldogs | 20–46 | Pampas XV | Buffalo City Stadium, East London |
| 15:30 | Try: Logan Basson 20'; Gareth Krause 37'; Con: Louis Kruger 21', 38' (2/2); Pen: Louis Kruger 5', 14' (2/2) | Scoreboard | Try: Javier Rojas 11', 50', 81'; Mariano Galarza 26'; Rodrigo Bruno 58'; Bruno Postiglioni 75'; Con: Benjamín Madero 27', 51', 58', 76', 82' (5/6); Pen: Benjamín Madero 40', 43' (2/2); Cards: Genaro Fessia (yellow card) 71' | Referee: Sindile Mayende |

| 23 March 2012 | Free State XV | 38–51 | Sharks XV | Free State Stadium, Bloemfontein |
| 19:10 | Try: FS Uys 13'; Kholo Ramashala 29'; Lee-Roy Bitterhout 52', 63'; Marcel van der Merwe 57'; Con: Riaan Smit 14', 30', 53', 58', 64' (5/5); Pen: Riaan Smit 16' (1/1) | Scoreboard | Try: S'bura Sithole 5'; Gouws Prinsloo 25'; Chris Cloete 39'; Wandile Mjekevu 48'; Jean Deysel 71'; Con: Gouws Prinsloo 6', 26', 49', 72' (4/5); Pen: Gouws Prinsloo 3', 22', 42', 67', 75', 78' (6/6) | Attendance: 10,485; Referee: Ben Crouse |

| 24 March 2012 | SWD Eagles | 26–46 | Boland Cavaliers | D'Almeida Stadium, Mossel Bay |
| 16:00 | Try: Michael Vermaak 34', 37'; Elric van Vuuren 44'; Lyndon Hartnick 58'; Con: Elric van Vuuren (0/4); Pen: Elric van Vuuren 9', 19' (2/2); Cards: Clinton Wagman (yellow card) 66' to 76' | Scoreboard | Try: Franzel September 11'; Zandré Jordaan 27'; PJ van Zyl 40'; Johnathan Francke 51'; Nolan Clark 66'; Brendon April 69' penalty try 78'; Con: Elgar Watts 40', 52', 67', 79' (4/7); Pen: Elgar Watts 23' (1/1); Cards: Ross Geldenhuys (yellow card) 36' to 44' | Attendance: 0 Referee: Joey Salmans |

| 24 March 2012 | Western Province | 30–25 | Eastern Province Kings | City Park Stadium, Athlone |
| 16:00 | Try: Ederies Arendse 14'; JP du Plessis 81'; Con: Demetri Catrakilis 82' (1/2); Pen: Demetri Catrakilis 30', 34', 58', 64', 68', 72' (6/7) | Scoreboard | Try: Andile Witbooi 5'; Scott van Breda 25'; Con: Justin van Staden (0/2); Pen: Justin van Staden 17', 22' (2/3); Scott van Breda 43', 50' (2/2); Drop: Justin van Staden 31' (1/2) | Referee: Pro Legoete |

==== Round four ====
| 30 March 2012 | Sharks XV | 38–20 | SWD Eagles | Kings Park Stadium, Durban |
| 16:30 | Try: S'bura Sithole 4'; Cobus Reinach 13'; Gouws Prinsloo 18'; Roscko Speckman 30'; Brynard Stander 36'; Tera Mtembu 49'; Con: Gouws Prinsloo 14', 19', 31', 37' (4/6) | Scoreboard | Try: Jeff Taljard 57'; Giant Mtyanda 63'; Con: Deroy Rhoode 58' (1/1); Raynor Becker 64' (1/1); Pen: Elric van Vuuren 2', 7' (2/2) | Referee: Jaco Peyper |

| 30 March 2012 | Eastern Province Kings | 36–22 | Free State XV | Nelson Mandela Bay Stadium, Port Elizabeth |
| 19:10 | Try: Boetie Britz 19'; Andile Witbooi 27', 72'; Jacques Engelbrecht 39'; Con: Scott van Breda (0/2); Falie Oelschig 40', 73' (2/2); Pen: Scott van Breda 13', 36' (2/2); Falie Oelschig 46', 63' (2/2); Cards: Justin van Staden (yellow card) 76' | Scoreboard | Try: Philip Burger 9'; Marcel van der Merwe 59'; Elandré Huggett 77'; Con: Riaan Smit 10', 60' (2/3); Pen: Riaan Smit (0/1); Drop: Riaan Smit 16' (1/1); Cards: Armandt Koster (yellow card) 45' to 55' | Referee: Christie du Preez |

| 31 March 2012 | Border Bulldogs | 7–31 | Western Province | Buffalo City Stadium, East London |
| 15:00 | Try: Rynardt van Wyk 69'; Con: Louis Kruger 70' (1/1); Pen: Logan Basson (0/2) | Scoreboard | Try: Nick Fenton-Wells 9'; Kurt Coleman 30', 45'; Nic Groom 33'; Don Armand 51'; Con: Kurt Coleman 31', 46', 52' (3/5) | Attendance: 500; Referee: Sindile Mayende |

| 31 March 2012 | Pampas XV | 30–27 | Boland Cavaliers | Newlands Stadium, Cape Town |
| 16:45 | Try: Ramiro Moyano 16'; Tomás Cubelli 56'; Martín Landajo 79'; Con: Santiago González Iglesias 19', 57', 80' (3/3); Pen: Santiago González Iglesias 6', 29', 64' (3/4) | Scoreboard | Try: Franzel September 35'; Senan van der Merwe 39'; Brendon April 54'; Con: Elgar Watts 36', 40', 55' (3/3); Pen: Elgar Watts 3', 42' (2/2) | Referee: Matt Kemp |

==== Round Five ====
| 13 April 2012 | SWD Eagles | 25 – 27 | Eastern Province Kings | Outeniqua Park, George |
| 19:10 | Try: Kempie Rautenbach 10'; Mzo Dyantyi 54'; Clinton Wagman 75'; Con: Raynor Becker 11', 76' (2/3); Pen: Raynor Becker 16', 49' (2/5); Cecil Dumond (0/1) | Scoreboard | Try: Norman Nelson 44'; Frank Herne 79'; Con: Justin van Staden 45' (1/1); Noel Oelschig (0/1); Pen: Justin van Staden 7', 30', 35', 42', 57' (5/5); Drop: Shane Gates (0/1) | Referee: Ben Crouse |

| 14 April 2012 | Free State XV | 36 – 28 | Border Bulldogs | Free State Stadium, Bloemfontein |
| 14:45 | Try: Nico Scheepers 19', 51', 72'; Barry Geel 54', 57'; Con: Riaan Smit 20' (1/1); Nico Scheepers 55', 58', 73' (3/4); Pen: Riaan Smit 25' (1/1) | Scoreboard | Try: Logan Basson 33'; Ntando Kebe 39'; Lesley Luiters 66'; Con: Ntabeni Dukisa 34' (1/2); Louis Kruger 67' (1/1); Pen: Ntabeni Dukisa 7', 13', 31' (3/4); Logan Basson (0/1) | Attendance: 2,500; Referee: Sindile Mayende |

| 14 April 2012 | Boland Cavaliers | 21 – 19 | Sharks XV | Alfa Sports Ground, Malmesbury |
| 16:00 | Try: Milroy Isaacs 28'; Brendon April 74'; Con: Ricardo Croy 75' (1/2); Pen: Ricardo Croy 19', 61', 68' (3/4); Cards: Jacquin Jansen (yellow card) 16' to 26' | Scoreboard | Try: S'bura Sithole 31'; Con: Gouws Prinsloo 32' (1/1); Pen: Gouws Prinsloo 2', 12', 17', 55' (4/5); Drop: Gouws Prinsloo (0/1) | Attendance: 7,000; Referee: Joey Salmans |

| 14 April 2012 | Western Province | 20 – 16 | Pampas XV | Danie Craven Stadium, Stellenbosch |
| 17:30 | Try: Danie Poolman 18'; Con: Demetri Catrakilis (0/1); Pen: Demetri Catrakilis 7', 26', 56', 64', 66' (5/6); Drop: Demetri Catrakilis (0/1) | Scoreboard | Try: Facundo Barrea 71'; Con: Benjamín Madero 72' (1/1); Pen: Benjamín Madero 35', 39', 58' (3/4) | Referee: Stuart Berry |

==== Round Six ====
| 20 April 2012 | Free State XV | 20 – 40 | Pampas XV | Free State Stadium, Bloemfontein |
| 19:10 | Try: Marcel Van Der Merwe 35'; Stephan van der Merwe 62'; Con: Nico Scheepers 36', 63' (2/2); Pen: Nico Scheepers 19', 40' (2/2) | Scoreboard | Try: penalty try 5'; Juan Gómez 20'; Santiago González Iglesias 47'; Gabriel Ascárate 74'; Con: Santiago González Iglesias 6', 21', 48', 75' (4/4); Pen: Santiago González Iglesias 2', 11', 39' (3/4); Drop: Santiago González Iglesias 64' (1/1); Cards: Gabriel Ascárate (yellow card) 61' to 72' | Attendance: 150; Referee: Joey Salmans |

| 21 April 2012 | Sharks XV | 28 – 18 | Eastern Province Kings | Kings Park Stadium, Durban |
| 14:45 | Try: Tera Mtembu 4', 32'; Brynard Stander 18'; Con: Gouws Prinsloo 5', 19' (2/3); Pen: Gouws Prinsloo 70', 74', 81' (3/3); Cards: Cobus Reinach (yellow card) 36' to 47' | Scoreboard | Try: Scott van Breda 37'; Darron Nell 46'; Con: Justin van Staden 38' (1/1); Scott van Breda (0/1); Pen: Scott van Breda 43', 72' (2/3) | Referee: Jason Jaftha |

| 20 April 2012 | Boland Cavaliers | 45 – 40 | Border Bulldogs | Boland Stadium, Wellington |
| 15:00 | Try: Adam Barlow 3'; Franzel September 19'; Ashton Constant 35'; Jacquin Jansen 39', 55'; Zandré Jordaan 42'; Brendon April 78'; Con: Elgar Watts 4', 20', 40', 56' (4/6); Ricardo Croy 79' (1/1); Pen: Elgar Watts (0/1) | Scoreboard | Try: Vuyo Mbotho 8'; Lubabalo Mzwakali 14'; Ntando Kebe 15'; Matthew Taljard 45'; Logan Basson 49'; Con: Ntabeni Dukisa 9', 14', 46' (3/5); Pen: Ntabeni Dukisa 27', 59', 64' (3/7); Logan Basson (0/1) | Attendance: 1,000; Referee: Matt Kemp |

| 21 April 2012 | SWD Eagles | 14 – 29 | Western Province | REC Ground, Oudtshoorn |
| 16:00 | Try: Deroy Rhoode 53'; Clinton Wagman 60'; Con: Deroy Rhoode 54', 61' (2/2); Pen: Deroy Rhoode (0/1); Cards: Grant le Roux (yellow card) 82' | Scoreboard | Try: Tyrone Holmes 14'; Kurt Coleman 16'; Nic Groom 46'; Rohan Kitshoff 76'; Con: Kurt Coleman 15', 17', 47' (3/3); Demetri Catrakilis (0/1); Pen: Kurt Coleman (0/1); Demetri Catrakilis 73' (1/1) | Attendance: 350; Referee: Rasta Rasivhenge |

==== Round Seven ====
| 27 April 2012 | Eastern Province Kings | 29 – 24 | Boland Cavaliers | Nelson Mandela Bay Stadium, Port Elizabeth |
| 15:00 | Try: Jongi Nokwe 12'; Scott van Breda 21'; Marcello Sampson 38'; Con: Justin van Staden 22' (1/3); Pen: Justin van Staden 5', 28', 30', 46' (4/4) | Scoreboard | Try: Siviwe Magaba 34'; Franzel September 42'; Johnathan Francke 77'; Con: Elgar Watts 35', 43', 78' (3/3); Pen: Elgar Watts 8' (1/4) | Referee: Rasta Rasivhenge |

| 28 April 2012 | Pampas XV | 24 – 30 | Sharks XV | A.F. Markötter Stadium, Stellenbosch |
| 14:45 | Try: Facundo Barrea 58'; Manuel Montero 71'; Con: Benjamin Madero 71' (1/2); Pen: Santiago Gonzalez Iglesias 40' (1/1); Benjamin Madero 75' (1/1); Drop: Santiago Gonzalez Iglesias 41' (1/1); Benjamin Madero 82' (1/1) | Scoreboard | Try: Paul Jordaan 7'; Cobus Reinach 11'; S'bura Sithole 24', 53'; Con: Gouws Prinsloo 12', 25' (2/4); Pen: Gouws Prinsloo 52', 78' (2/3) | Attendance: 3,000; Referee: Quinton Immelman |

| 28 April 2012 | Border Bulldogs | 47 – 31 | SWD Eagles | Queen's College, Queenstown |
| 15:00 | Try: Logan Basson 16'; Ntando Kebe 38' penalty try 47'; Armon Fourie 62'; Lesley Luiters 68'; Con: Ntabeni Dukisa 17', 39', 48', 63', 69' (5/5); Pen: Ntabeni Dukisa 10', 24', 57', 66' (4/6) | Scoreboard | Try: Clinton Wagman 8'; Shaun Raubenheimer 13'; Johan Herbst 29'; Kempie Rautenbach 53'; Baldwin McBean 74'; Con: Deroy Rhoode 9', 54', 75' (3/5); Pen: Deroy Rhoode (0/1) | Referee: Matt Kemp |

| 28 April 2012 | Western Province | 42 – 31 | Free State XV | Durbanville Rugby Club, Durbanville |
| 15:30 | Try: Damian de Allende 17'; Rohan Kitshoff 22', 54', 77'; Ghafoer Luckan 34'; Hilton Lobberts 64'; Con: Demetri Catrakilis 18', 35', 78' (3/6); Pen: Demetri Catrakilis 30', 47' (2/2) | Scoreboard | Try: Riaan Smit 12'; Inus Kritzinger 40'; Robbie van Schalkwyk 42'; Marco Mason 50'; Con: Nico Scheepers 12', 40', 42', 50' (4/4); Pen: Nico Scheepers 58' (1/2); Cards: Marco Mason (yellow card) 37' to 44' | Referee: Tiaan Jonker |

=== Quarter finals ===
| 4 May 2012 | Griquas | 26 – 18 | Pampas XV | Griqua Park, Kimberley |
| 15:00 | Try: Ligtoring Landman 10'; Con: Rudi Vogt (0/1); Pen: Rudi Vogt 2', 13', 27', 31', 43', 47', 70' (7/9); Drop: Rudi Vogt (0/1) | Scoreboard | Try: Gabriel Ascarate 57'; Benjamín Madero 60'; Con: Benjamin Madero 61' (1/2); Pen: Benjamin Madero 6', 16' (2/2) | Attendance: 1,000; Referee: Marius van der Westhuizen |

| 4 May 2012 | Pumas | 30 – 19 | Eastern Province Kings | Mbombela Stadium, Mbombela |
| 19:10 | Try: Ashley Buys 2'; Torsten van Jaarsveld 12'; Jaco Bouwer 19'; Corné Fourie 49'; Con: JC Roos 3', 50' (2/4); Pen: JC Roos 44', 69' (2/2); Drop: JC Roos (0/1); Cards: Renaldo Bothma (yellow card) 38' to 48' | Scoreboard | Try: SP Marais 46'; Con: Justin van Staden 47' (1/1); Pen: Justin van Staden 9', 22', 39', 53' (4/8) | Referee: Rasta Rasivhenge |

| 5 May 2012 | Sharks XV | 36 – 37 | Blue Bulls | Kings Park Stadium, Durban |
| 14:00 | Try: Francois Kleinhans 29'; S'bura Sithole 44'; Chris Jordaan 72'; Con: Gouws Prinsloo 30', 45', 73' (3/3); Pen: Gouws Prinsloo 4', 8', 20', 39', 41' (5/6); Cards: Kyle Cooper (yellow card) 77' | Scoreboard | Try: Gerrit-Jan van Velze 23'; Courtnall Skosan 58'; Ulrich Beyers 78'; Jan Serfontein 82'; Con: Wesley Dunlop 24', 59' (2/2); Tony Jantjies 79', 83' (2/2); Pen: Wesley Dunlop 7', 47' (2/2); Drop: Ulrich Beyers 27' (1/1) | Referee: Lourens van der Merwe |

| 5 May 2012 | Western Province | 58 – 34 | Golden Lions | City Park Stadium, Athlone |
| 15:30 | Try: Hilton Lobberts 1'; Quinn Roux 12'; Tyrone Holmes 31'; Rohan Kitshoff 39', 73'; Nick Fenton-Wells 41'; Kurt Coleman 56', 59', 68'; Con: Demetri Catrakilis 2', 32', 42', 59', 74' (5/9); Pen: Demetri Catrakilis 9' (1/1) | Scoreboard | Try: François du Toit 10'; JR Esterhuizen 23'; Robert de Bruyn 63'; Garth April 79'; Con: Guy Cronjé 11', 24', 64', 80' (4/4); Pen: Guy Cronjé 20', 37' (2/2) | Referee: Ben Crouse |

=== Semi-finals ===
| 11 May 2012 | Griquas | 30 – 17 | Blue Bulls | Griqua Park, Kimberley |
| 15:00 | Try: Leon Karemaker 11'; Rocco Jansen 24'; Francois Brummer 51'; Jean Stemmet 71'; Con: Francois Brummer (0/1); Marnitz Boshoff 25', 52' (2/3); Pen: Marnitz Boshoff 20', 79' (2/3); Drop: Francois Brummer (0/1); Marnitz Boshoff (0/1) | Scoreboard | Try: Sampie Mastriet 38'; Jan Serfontein 57'; Daniel Adongo 63'; Con: Wesley Dunlop (0/1); Tony Jantjies 58' (1/2); Pen: Wesley Dunlop (0/1); Ulrich Beyers (0/1) | Referee: Quinton Immelman |

| 12 May 2012 | Western Province | 33 – 20 | Pumas | Newlands Stadium, Cape Town |
| 16:15 | Try: Sidney Tobias 22'; Ederies Arendse 36'; Nick Fenton-Wells 65'; Con: Demetri Catrakilis 23', 37', 69' (3/3); Pen: Demetri Catrakilis 16', 31', 39', 44' (4/5); Drop: Demetri Catrakilis (0/1) | Scoreboard | Try: JW Jonker 40'; Con: JC Roos (0/1); Pen: JC Roos 8', 25', 29', 38', 54' (5/5); Drop: Coenie van Wyk (0/1) | Referee: Rasta Rasivhenge |

=== Final ===
| 18 May 2012 | Griquas | 18 – 20 | Western Province | Griqua Park, Kimberley |
| 19:10 | Try: Leon Karemaker 2'; Janro van Niekerk 48'; Con: Marnitz Boshoff 3' (1/2); Pen: Marnitz Boshoff 15', 36' (2/5); Rudi Vogt (0/2); Drop: Francois Brummer (0/1) | Scoreboard | Try: Danie Poolman 18'; Rohan Kitshoff 81'; Con: Demetri Catrakilis 19', 82' (2/2); Pen: Demetri Catrakilis 38', 45' (2/3) | Attendance: 5,000; Referee: Lourens van der Merwe |

== Winners ==
2012 Vodacom Cup
CHAMPIONS
Western Province
1st title

== Top scorers ==
The following sections contain only points and tries which have been scored in competitive games in the 2012 Vodacom Cup.

=== Top points scorers ===
| Rank | Player | Team | Points |
|---|---|---|---|
| 1 | Gouws Prinsloo | Sharks XV | 134 |
| 2 | Demetri Catrakilis | Western Province | 127 |
| 3 | JC Roos | Pumas | 115 |
| 4 | Rudi Vogt | Griquas | 106 |
| 5 | Santiago González Iglesias | Pampas XV | 66 |
| 5 | Justin van Staden | Eastern Province Kings | 66 |
| 7 | Ntabeni Dukisa | Border Bulldogs | 63 |
| 8 | Jaun Kotzé | Falcons | 59 |
| 9 | Benjamín Madero | Pampas XV | 58 |
| 10 | André Pretorius | Leopards | 54 |

Source: South African Rugby Union

=== Top try scorers ===
| Rank | Player | Team | Tries |
|---|---|---|---|
| 1 | Jaco Bouwer | Pumas | 7 |
| 1 | Rohan Kitshoff | Western Province | 7 |
| 3 | Kurt Coleman | Western Province | 6 |
| 3 | S'bura Sithole | Sharks XV | 6 |
| 3 | Coenie van Wyk | Pumas | 6 |
| 3 | Anthony Volmink | Golden Lions | 6 |
| 7 | Leon Karemaker | Griquas | 5 |
| 7 | Ligtoring Landman | Griquas | 5 |
| 7 | Sampie Mastriet | Blue Bulls | 5 |
| 7 | Marnus Schoeman | Griquas | 5 |
| 7 | Franzel September | Boland Cavaliers | 5 |
| 7 | Nicky Steyn | Griffons | 5 |

Source: South African Rugby Union

== See also ==
- Vodacom Cup
- 2012 Currie Cup Premier Division
- 2012 Currie Cup First Division
