= Marius Fourie =

South African rugby union player

- Born: 15 October 1990 (age 36) Cape Town, South Africa
- Height: 1.83 m (6 ft 0 in)
- Weight: 108 kg (17 st 0 lb; 238 lb)
- School: Hoërskool Outeniqua, George
- University: North-West University, Potchefstroom

Rugby union career
- Position: Hooker
Youth career
- 2006–2008: SWD Eagles
- 2010–2011: Leopards
Amateur team(s)
Years	Team	Apps	(Points)
2012–2014	NWU Pukke	16	(10)
Senior career
Years	Team	Apps	(Points)
2011–2014	Leopards	30	(10)
2015	SWD Eagles	18	(0)
2015	→ Western Province	2	(0)
2016–2017	Griquas	35	(10)
- Correct as of 19 May 2018
International career
Years	Team	Apps	(Points)
2008	South Africa Under-18 Elite Squad		
- Correct as of 25 March 2015

Marius Fourie (born 15 October 1990 in Cape Town, South Africa) is a South African rugby union player who most recently played for Griquas. His regular position is hooker.

== Career ==
=== Youth ===
Fourie played high school rugby for Hoërskool Outeniqua, where he played in excess of 60 matches. He also progressed through the age levels at the SWD Eagles, earning call-ups to represent them at the Under-16 Grant Khomo Week in 2006, the Under-18 Academy Week in 2007 and the Under-18 Craven Week in 2008, which also resulted in him being picked for a South African Under-18 Elite squad in 2008.

=== Leopards / NWU Pukke ===
After finishing high school, Fourie enrolled at North-West University in Potchefstroom. He was the reserve hooker for the Leopards U21 side that played in the 2010 Under-21 Provincial Championship before being named in the Leopards' senior squad for the 2011 Vodacom Cup competition. He came on as a replacement in their opening match of the season, a 27–21 victory over the Border Bulldogs. He made his first start the following week against another Eastern Cape side, the Eastern Province Kings, but could not prevent his side slipping to a 25–31 defeat. He also appeared in their next two matches against the Free State Cheetahs and the SWD Eagles.

In August 2011, Fourie made his debut in the 2011 Currie Cup Premier Division. He was an unused substitute in their match against the Pumas, but did play off the bench in their next match, an 18–32 defeat to Griquas. After a further two appearances from the bench, he made his first Currie Cup start for the Leopards against the Free State Cheetahs in Bloemfontein. He made a total of eight appearances in the Currie Cup Premier Division; however, with the Leopards just picking up one win all season to finish bottom of the competition and relegated to the First Division, this turned out to be his only appearances at this level.

In 2012, he started the season representing university side NWU Pukke in the 2012 Varsity Cup. He made seven appearances and scored one try as NWU reached the semi-final of the competition, where they lost to eventual winners UP Tuks. At the conclusion of NWU's involvement in that competition, Fourie reverted to the Leopards' senior side, making four appearances for them during the 2012 Vodacom Cup competition. He was one of their key players during their 2012 Currie Cup First Division campaign, making thirteen appearances. He scored his first ever senior try in their Round Nine match against the Griffons and followed that up with another in their next match against the Boland Cavaliers. The Leopards finished fourth on the log and made it to the semi-finals of the competition, where they lost 27–50 to the Eastern Province Kings in Port Elizabeth.

Fourie made four appearances for the NWU Pukke during the 2013 Varsity Cup competition, this time narrowly missing out on a semi-final spot. He didn't play any matches for the remainder of 2013, but returned in 2014 to make five appearances for NWU Pukke as they reached the final of the competition, only to lose 33–39 to UCT Ikey Tigers in dramatic fashion. He made two appearances for the Leopards during the 2014 Currie Cup First Division, helping them top the log, only to lose to the Falcons in the semi-final.

=== SWD Eagles ===
Fourie returned to George for the 2015 to join the team he represented at youth level, the SWD Eagles. He was included in their squad for the 2015 Vodacom Cup and made his debut by starting their opening match of the season, a 34–17 victory against the Free State XV.

=== Griquas ===
He joined Kimberley-based side Griquas for the 2016 season.
