= Ghafoer Luckan =

South African rugby union player

- Full name: Ghafoer Luckan
- Born: 18 December 1985 (age 40) Cape Town, South Africa
- Height: 1.78 m (5 ft 10 in)
- Weight: 87 kg (13 st 10 lb; 192 lb)
- School: Rylands High School, Athlone

Rugby union career
- Position: Winger
- Current team: SWD Eagles
Youth career
- 2005–2006: Western Province
Amateur team(s)
Years	Team	Apps	(Points)
2010	NWU Pukke	3	(0)
Senior career
Years	Team	Apps	(Points)
2006–2007	Western Province	0	(0)
2009	Border Bulldogs	11	(15)
2010	Leopards	2	(0)
2012	Western Province	2	(5)
2012–2013	SWD Eagles	15	(35)
- Correct as of 9 September 2013

Ghafoer Luckan (born 18 December 1985) is a former South African rugby union player, currently a strength and conditioning coach with the Springbok 7's team. His regular playing position was winger.

== Career ==
=== Youth ===
He started his career at Western Province and represented them in the Under-21 Currie Cup competition in 2005 and 2006. He was included in the senior squads for the 2006 Vodacom Cup, 2007 Vodacom Cup and 2007 Currie Cup Premier Division seasons, but failed to make an appearance in any of those competitions.

=== Border Bulldogs ===
In 2009, he moved to the Border Bulldogs, where he did make his first class debut against the Mighty Elephants in the opening game of the 2009 Currie Cup First Division season. He made eleven appearances in total, scoring three tries.

=== Leopards and NWU Pukke ===
In 2010, he moved to Potchefstroom where he joined university side the NWU Pukke in the 2010 Varsity Cup competition. He also made two substitute appearances for the Leopards in 2010 Currie Cup Premier Division competition.

=== Western Province ===
He returned to Western Province and made his debut for them in the 2012 Vodacom Cup as a last-minute substitute against the SWD Eagles. The following week, he started against the Free State XV and scored a first half try.

=== SWD Eagles ===
He joined the SWD Eagles in the latter half of 2012 and scored six tries for them in the 2012 Currie Cup First Division season. A further five appearances followed in the 2013 Vodacom Cup, as well as six in the 2013 Currie Cup Premier Division.

On 1 August 2013, he announced his retirement as a player and was appointed as a biokineticist at the SWD Eagles.
