= Griesel =

Griesel is a surname of German origin. Notable people with the surname include:

- Izette Griesel (born 1992), South African netball player
- Jeannette Griesel (born 1982), German businesswoman and entrepreneur
- Werner Griesel (born 1986), South African rugby union player
