= Mzo Dyantyi =

South African rugby union player

- Full name: Mzoxolo Dyantyi
- Born: 10 October 1985 (age 41) Port Elizabeth, South Africa
- Height: 1.62 m (5 ft 4 in)
- Weight: 84 kg (13 st 3 lb; 185 lb)
- School: Khwezi Lomso Comprehensive

Rugby union career
- Position: Scrum-half
Youth career
- 2006: Griffons
Senior career
| Years | Team | Apps | (Points) |
| 2006 | Griffons | 11 | (0) |
| 2007–2016 | SWD Eagles | 78 | (40) |
- Correct as of 9 October 2016

Mzoxolo Dyantyi (born 10 October 1985 in Port Elizabeth) is a South African rugby union player, who most recently played with the SWD Eagles. His regular position is scrum-half.

== Career ==
=== Griffons ===
After playing for SWD in the Provincial Amateur Competition in 2005, he joined Welkom-based side the Griffons in 2006. He made his first class debut for the Griffons during the 2006 Vodacom Cup, coming on as a late substitute against the Falcons, making a total of eight appearances during that competition.

He made his Currie Cup debut in July 2006, featuring as a substitute in the Griffons' match against the SWD Eagles. He made just one more appearance for the Griffons in their match against the Boland Cavaliers.

=== SWD Eagles ===
He returned to George and rejoined the SWD Eagles in 2007, making a single substitute appearance in the 2007 Currie Cup First Division. He remained a bit-part player for the Eagles for the next few seasons, only making twenty appearances in a five-year period between 2007 and 2011. He became more involved in first team affairs in 2012, however, making twenty appearances in 2012 – in both the Vodacom Cup and Currie Cup competitions – and a further fifteen appearances in 2013. He was also contracted by the Eagles for 2014.
