= Hansie Graaff =

South African rugby union player (born 1989)

- Full name: Johannes Petrus Jacobus Graaff
- Born: 10 September 1989 (age 37) Pretoria, South Africa
- Height: 1.90 m (6 ft 3 in)
- Weight: 97 kg (214 lb; 15 st 4 lb)
- School: Wonderboom High School
- University: Tshwane University of Technology

Rugby union career
- Position: Utility back
- Current team: Massy
Amateur team(s)
Years	Team	Apps	(Points)
2010–2012	TUT Vikings	21	(30)
Senior career
Years	Team	Apps	(Points)
2012–2013	Griffons	27	(178)
2014	Sharks XV	2	(5)
2014–2015	Eastern Province Kings	9	(17)
2014	→ Border Bulldogs	1	(5)
2016	SWD Eagles	16	(104)
2016–2018	El Salvador	39	(238)
2018–present	Massy	2	(21)
- Correct as of 30 August 2018

Johannes Petrus Jacobus 'Hansie' Graaff (born 10 September 1989 in Pretoria) is a South African rugby union player for Bayonne in the Top 14 in France. He is a utility back that can play as a fly-half, centre, winger or full-back.He is currently with Naka bulls as a no 10, where they won the gold cup 3 years in a row.

== Career ==
=== Varsity Cup rugby ===
He sprung to prominence playing for a struggling TUT Vikings side in the Varsity Cup between 2010 and 2012, scoring six tries in 21 appearances during the three seasons.

=== Griffons / Cheetahs ===
He joined the Griffons shortly after the 2012 Varsity Cup and made his first class debut for them in their 30–19 defeat to the Leopards in Potchefstroom in the 2012 Vodacom Cup competition. Two more substitute appearances followed in the same competition before a highly successful 2012 Currie Cup First Division campaign, where Graaff scored 134 points in fifteen starts to finish fourth in the scoring charts.

This led to his inclusion in the final Cheetahs squad for the 2013 Super Rugby season, but he failed to make any appearances for them. Instead, a further seven appearances followed in the 2013 Vodacom Cup and 2013 Currie Cup First Division competitions.

=== Sharks ===
He subsequently moved to the Sharks for the 2013 Currie Cup Premier Division, but missed the entire competition through a knee injury. However, he was offered a contract extension with the Durban-based side until April 2014 and made his debut for them in the 2014 Vodacom Cup match against the Border Bulldogs, marking the occasion by scoring a 10th minute try to help the Sharks to a 46–24 victory.

=== Eastern Province Kings ===
He joined Port Elizabeth-based side Eastern Province Kings prior to the 2014 Currie Cup Premier Division season. In June 2014, he was selected in the starting line-up for the Eastern Province Kings side to face Wales during a tour match during a 2014 incoming tour. He made his debut for the Eastern Province Kings, playing 72 minutes of the match as the Kings suffered a 12–34 defeat.

However, he didn't feature in their 2014 Currie Cup Premier Division campaign, instead being loaned to neighbours Border Bulldogs for one match. He eventually made his debut for the EP Kings in a domestic competition by starting their first match of the 2015 Vodacom Cup season, a 19–27 defeat to defending champions Griquas.

=== SWD Eagles ===
Graaff moved to George for the 2016 season, joining the SWD Eagles.

=== El Salvador ===
After the 2016 Currie Cup, Graaff joined Spanish División de Honor side El Salvador.

=== RCME Massy ===
During the 2018-2019 season, Graaff played for RCME Massy, in the French Pro D2.

=== Aviron Bayonnais ===
Graaff moved to Aviron Bayonnais for the 2019 season, a Top14 club of the French Championship.
