= Gerhard Nortier =

- Full name: Gerhard Johan Nortier
- Born: 4 March 1989 (age 37) George, South Africa
- Height: 1.80 m (5 ft 11 in)
- Weight: 92 kg (14 st 7 lb; 203 lb)
- School: Oudtshoorn High School, Oudtshoorn
- University: North-West University

Rugby union career
- Position: Fly-half
- Current team: Slava Moscow
Youth career
- 2005–2007: SWD Eagles
Amateur team(s)
| Years | Team | Apps | (Points) |
| 2012–2013 | NWU Pukke | 13 | (115) |
| 2015–2017 | Bradford & Bingley | 28 | (281) |
| 2019– | Slava Moscow | | |
Senior career
| Years | Team | Apps | (Points) |
| 2012–2013 | Leopards | 15 | (17) |
| 2014 | Leopards XV | 7 | (79) |
| 2015 | SWD Eagles | 0 | (0) |
| 2017–2018 | Leopards | 23 | (110) |
| 2019 | SWD Eagles | 10 | (45) |
- Correct as of 25 June 2022

Gerhard Johan Nortier (born 4 March 1989 in George, South Africa) is a South African rugby union player for the Slava Moscow in Russia. His regular position is fly-half.

== Career ==
=== Youth and Varsity rugby ===
Nortier represented the South Western Districts at youth level, playing for them at the Under-16 Grant Khomo Week in 2005 and the Under-18 Craven Week tournaments in 2006 and 2007.

He then moved to Potchefstroom, joining the Leopards. He played for the Leopards U19 side in the 2008 Under-19 Provincial Championship competition and for the Leopards U21 side in the Under-21 competitions in 2009 and 2010.

He also played Varsity Cup rugby for the Potchefstroom-based university NWU Pukke, representing them in the 2012 and 2013 editions of the tournament. In 2012, he played in all 8 matches for the NWU Pukke and finished as joint second top points scorer in the competition – just one point behind UP Tuks' Wesley Dunlop – and in 2013, he finished third.

=== Senior career ===
After his successful season in the 2012 Varsity Cup, Nortier was included in the Leopards squad for the 2012 Vodacom Cup competition. He made his first class debut for them in their Round 4 defeat to the Blue Bulls, with his first points coming in their match against the Pumas. He played an even bigger role in the Leopards' 2012 Currie Cup First Division season; after making his debut in the first match of the season against the Pumas, Nortier scored two tries, a conversion and a penalty in his ten appearances.

He made just one appearance in the 2013 Currie Cup First Division season, against the Pumas, before injury ruled him out of the remainder of 2013. However, he returned in style during the 2014 Vodacom Cup competition, where he finished as the Leopards XV' top points scorer scoring 79 points in his seven starts.
