= Senan van der Merwe =

South African rugby union player

- Full name: Senan Declan Clint van der Merwe
- Born: 2 February 1986 (age 40) Robertson, South Africa
- Height: 1.86 m (6 ft 1 in)
- Weight: 90 kg (14 st 2 lb; 198 lb)
- School: Pioneer

Rugby union career
- Position: Winger
Youth career
- 2006–2007: Boland Cavaliers
Amateur team(s)
Years	Team	Apps	(Points)
- Robertson
Senior career
Years	Team	Apps	(Points)
2012–2015	Boland Cavaliers	35	(40)
- Correct as of 4 October 2015

Senan Declan Clint van der Merwe (born 2 February 1986) is a South African professional rugby union player, who most recently played with the Boland Cavaliers. His regular position is winger.

== Career ==
=== Youth and amateur rugby ===
Van der Merwe represented the Boland U21 side in the 2006 and 2007 editions of the Under-21 Provincial Championship. He then played club rugby for local amateur side Robertson until 2011.

=== Boland Cavaliers ===
In 2012, he was included in the Boland Cavaliers squad for the 2012 Vodacom Cup. He made his first class debut by coming on as a late replacement in their first match of the season, a 22–51 defeat to Western Cape rivals Western Province. After one more appearance off the bench in their next match against the Free State XV, he made his first senior start against the other team from the Western Cape in the competition, the SWD Eagles. He also started their next match, a 27–30 defeat to defending champions, Argentine side Pampas XV and scored his first try in a senior match when he dotted down just before half-time.

He also featured in the 2012 Currie Cup First Division for a Boland Cavaliers team trying to defend the title they won in 2011; he started their first match of the season against the Eastern Province Kings to make his Currie Cup debut, but suffering a 20–25 defeat to the team from Port Elizabeth. After a further five appearances, he scored his first Currie Cup try against the same opposition in a 19–57 defeat and followed it up with his second a week later in a 33–36 defeat to the Pumas. Boland eventually finished sixth to miss out on a semi-final play-off berth, with Van der Merwe making eleven appearances.

He played in three of Boland's matches during the 2013 Vodacom Cup competition and also kept up his knack of scoring against the Eastern Province Kings, but ended on the losing side on all three occasions as his side finished bottom of the Southern Section. They performed slightly better in the 2013 Currie Cup First Division, finishing fifth and just outside a semi-final spot. Van der Merwe made six starts, played off the bench on two occasions and scored two tries in their 20–7 victory over the Falcons in Round Four of the competition.

He didn't represent Boland Cavaliers in provincial competition in 2014, but did return in the 2015 Vodacom Cup competition, starting their 10–25 defeat to Western Province in Caledon in their opening match of the competition.
