= Karlo Aspeling =

South African rugby union player

- Full name: Karlo Gericke Aspeling
- Born: 13 December 1987 (age 38) George, South Africa
- Height: 1.79 m (5 ft 10 1/2 in)
- Weight: 88 kg (13 st 12 lb; 194 lb)
- School: Outeniqua High School
- University: University of Pretoria, University of South Africa

Rugby union career
- Position: Fly-half
Youth career
- 2006: SWD Eagles
Senior career
Years	Team	Apps	(Points)
2012	Falcons	14	(106)
2013	Border Bulldogs	20	(99)
2014	SWD Eagles	13	(114)
2014–2015	CUS Ad Maiora	10	(118)
2015	Eastern Province Kings	9	(6)
2016	Falcons	17	(125)
2018–2019	CSM București	9	(13)
2019–2021	Eastern Province Elephants	3	(0)
- Correct as of 29 March 2022

Karlo Gericke Aspeling (born 13 December 1987) is a South African rugby union player for the Eastern Province Elephants in the Currie Cup and in the Rugby Challenge. His regular position is fly half.

== Career ==
He started his career playing for local team SWD Eagles in the 2006 Under–19 and Under-21 Provincial Championship competitions.

He was included in the UP Tuks Varsity Cup team in 2011 and in the NMMU Madibaz team in 2012 but failed to make an appearance.

He then joined the Falcons for the 2012 Currie Cup First Division season, making his debut for them in their season opener against the Griffons. He played in all 14 his team's matches that season, scoring 106 points.

The following season, he joined East London-based team Border Bulldogs for the 2013 Vodacom Cup. Again, he played in all their games in that competition, scoring 66 points.

In 2014, Aspeling moved to Turin to play for Italian Serie A side CUS Ad Maiora. He started all ten of their matches during the 2014–2015 season and finished the season as their top scorer with 118 points.
