= Adriaan Engelbrecht =

South African rugby union player

- Full name: Adriaan Erasmus Engelbrecht
- Born: 14 September 1990 (age 36) Pretoria, South Africa
- Height: 1.85 m (6 ft 1 in)
- Weight: 98 kg (216 lb; 15 st 6 lb)
- School: Hoër Volkskool, Potchefstroom

Rugby union career
- Position: Centre
- Current team: Leopards
Youth career
- 2008–2011: Leopards
Amateur team(s)
Years	Team	Apps	(Points)
2014–2015	NWU Pukke	8	(71)
Senior career
Years	Team	Apps	(Points)
2011–2015	Leopards	53	(281)
- Correct as of 8 October 2015
International career
Years	Team	Apps	(Points)
2013	South Africa President's XV	4	(5)
- Correct as of 17 June 2013

Adriaan Erasmus 'Meel' Engelbrecht (born 14 September 1990) is a former South African rugby union player, that spent his entire career at the Leopards. His regular position was fly-half or centre.

He retired from rugby union prior to the 2016 season.

== Career ==
=== Youth ===
He represented the Leopards at the 2008 Under-18 Craven Week tournament and progressed through the age groups, playing in the Under-19 Provincial Championship in 2009 and the Under-21 Provincial Championship in 2010 and 2011.

=== Senior career ===
He made his first class debut for the Leopards in the 2011 Vodacom Cup competition in a match against the Eastern Province Kings. He played in the Under-21 Provincial Championship in the rest of the season, but made his return to the senior side in the 2012 Vodacom Cup, scoring four tries and made twelve starts in the 2012 Currie Cup First Division season.

He was a member of the Leopards team that won the 2015 Currie Cup First Division. He featured in a total of thirteen matches during the 2015 Currie Cup qualification rounds and First Division proper and was the Leopards' top scorer, contributing 147 points for the side. He also started the final, where he kicked 14 points to help the Leopards to a 44–20 victory over the SWD Eagles to win the competition for the first time in their history.

In 2013, he was included in a South Africa President's XV team that played in the 2013 IRB Tbilisi Cup and won the tournament after winning all three matches.
