= Willie Odendaal =

South African rugby union player

- Full name: Willem Adriaan Odendaal
- Born: 11 July 1990 (age 36) Pretoria, South Africa
- Height: 1.82 m (5 ft 11 1/2 in)
- Weight: 95 kg (14 st 13 lb; 209 lb)
- School: Hoërskool Eldoraigne, Pretoria
- University: University of South Africa

Rugby union career
- Position: Scrum-half / Centre / Winger
- Current team: QBR
Youth career
- 2008: Blue Bulls
- 2008–2009: Pumas
Senior career
Years	Team	Apps	(Points)
2010–2015	Falcons	91	(80)
- Correct as of 4 October 2015

Willem Adriaan Odendaal (born 11 July 1990 in Pretoria, South Africa) is a South African rugby union player, who most recently played with the Falcons. He can play as a scrum-half, centre or winger.

== Career ==
=== Youth ===
Odendaal played school rugby for Hoërskool Eldoraigne and earned a selection to the Blue Bulls squad for the Under-18 Craven Week in 2008. Shortly afterwards, he joined Witbank-based side the Pumas. He played for the Pumas U19 team in the 2008 and 2009 Under-19 Provincial Championships.

=== Falcons ===
2010 saw Odendaal move to the East Rand to join the Falcons. After playing in a compulsory friendly match for them against the Sharks in Nigel prior to the 2010 Currie Cup First Division season, he made his debut in the competition proper by starting their first match of the season against the Griffons in Welkom. He made eight appearances in the competition and playing mainly as a scrum-half. Eight appearances followed in the 2011 Vodacom Cup, which saw him score his first senior try against the Border Bulldogs and another against Argentineaninvitational side Pampas XV. Six starts and two appearances off the bench followed in his second Currie Cup campaign in 2011, contributing one try.

From 2012, Odendaal played mainly as a centre. After scoring two tries in six appearances during the 2012 Vodacom Cup competition, he firmly established himself as a first choice for the Falcons, starting in thirteen of their matches during the 2012 Currie Cup First Division season. He scored three tries, but could not help the Falcons finish higher than second-last in the competition. After a further seven appearances in the 2013 Vodacom Cup, he had his most prolific Currie Cup season for the Falcons, scoring seven tries in eleven appearances. He topped the try-scoring charts for the Falcons and finished ninth overall. His try-scoring form included scoring a first half hat-trick against the SWD Eagles in Kempton Park, but could not prevent the Falcons losing the match as the visitors rallied back to win the match 38–37.
