= Franzel September =

South African rugby union player

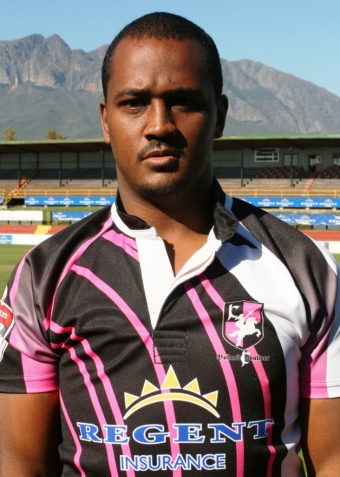
- Full name: Franzel Julio September
- Born: 6 June 1986 (age 40) Paarl, South Africa
- Height: 1.85 m (6 ft 1 in)
- Weight: 100 kg (15 st 10 lb; 220 lb)
- School: Bergrivier Hoërskool, Wellington
- University: Cape Peninsula University of Technology
- Occupation: Head Coach of the Springbok Women

Rugby union career
- Position: Flanker
- Current team: Boland Cavaliers
Youth career
- 2004–2005: Boland Cavaliers
Amateur team(s)
Years	Team	Apps	(Points)
2006–2008	Roses United		
Senior career
Years	Team	Apps	(Points)
2009–?	SWD Eagles	1	(0)
2010–?	Boland Cavaliers	80	(145)
- Correct as of 1 October 2014
Coaching career
- Years: Team
- 2023–: South Africa Women (Assistant coach)

Franzel Julio September (born 6 June 1986) is a South African professional rugby union player, currently the head coach of the Springbok Women. His regular position is flanker.

== Career ==
=== Youth and Amateur rugby ===
September played some youth rugby for his provincial side, Boland. He represented their Under-18 side at the 2004 Academy Week competition and their Under-19 in the 2005 Under-19 Provincial Championship. However, he failed to make the breakthrough to the senior side and instead played club rugby for Roses United, also representing them at the National Club Championships in 2006.

=== SWD Eagles ===
In 2009, September finally got an opportunity to play provincial rugby when he signed for George-based side the SWD Eagles. He made his debut off the bench late in their 2009 Vodacom Cup match against the Mighty Elephants. However, that also turned out to be his only playing time in the competition, failing to come on as a substitute in the other two matches that he was named on the replacement bench.

=== Boland Cavaliers ===
He returned to the Boland and played some rugby for their amateur side in the latter part of 2009. In 2010, however, he immediately established himself as the first-choice flanker for the Boland Cavaliers. His first senior start came during the 2010 Vodacom Cup competition, starting in their match against Western Province and scoring two tries in the first half to help his side to a 37–28 victory. He started eight of their nine matches in the competition to help them top the Northern Section of the competition and reaching the semi-finals, where they lost 22–14 to the Free State XV. In addition to the two tries in his first match, September contributed a further two tries during the competition to end just one behind the Cavaliers' top try scorer, Willie le Roux.

He also found himself included in their Currie Cup squad and made ten starts in their 2010 Currie Cup First Division campaign as they finished third on the log, scoring three tries in the process.

He made a further eight appearances during the 2011 Vodacom Cup competition, but he tore some ligaments in his left knee during the 2011 Currie Cup First Division season, restricting him to just two appearances. In his absence, Boland clinched the First Division title, beating the Eastern Province Kings in the final.

He made a full recovery in time for the 2012 Vodacom Cup competition and scored five tries in seven appearances, the top try scorer for the Cavaliers and just two off the overall top try scorers, Jaco Bouwer of the Pumas and Rohan Kitshoff of Western Province. He continued his rich vein of scoring in the 2012 Currie Cup First Division season as he scored a further seven tries in twelve appearances, including a hat-trick of tries in their match against the Griffons in Welkom.

September started 18 of Boland's matches during the 2013 Vodacom Cup and Currie Cup seasons, contributing a further four tries.
