= Grant le Roux =

South African rugby union player

- Born: 13 January 1986 (age 40) Sasolburg, South Africa
- Height: 1.96 m (6 ft 5 in)
- Weight: 111 kg (17 st 7 lb; 245 lb)
- School: Vereeniging Technical High
- University: North-West University

Rugby union career
- Position: Lock
Youth career
- 2004: Falcons
- 2005–2007: Leopards
Amateur team(s)
Years	Team	Apps	(Points)
2008–2009	NWU Pukke	17	(20)
Senior career
Years	Team	Apps	(Points)
2009–2011	Boland Cavaliers	44	(5)
2012–2016	SWD Eagles	68	(20)
- Correct as of 9 October 2016

Grant le Roux (born 13 January 1986) is a South African rugby union player, who most recently played with the SWD Eagles. His regular position is lock.

== Career ==
After playing for the Falcons at the 2004 Under–18 Craven Week tournament, he joined the Leopards and played for their Under–19 team in 2005 and their Under–21 team in 2006 and 2007.

He then played for the local university side, the NWU Pukke in the 2008 and 2009 Varsity Cup tournaments.

In 2009, he moved to the Boland Cavaliers, where he made his senior debut in the 2009 Currie Cup Premier Division against the Leopards. He established himself as a regular as Boland, making 44 appearances before moving to the SWD Eagles before the 2012 Vodacom Cup season.
