= Siyanda Ndlovu =

South African soccer player

Personal information
- Birth name: Siyanda Mthanti
- Date of birth: 19 September 2002 (age 24)
- Place of birth: Dannhauser, KwaZulu-Natal, South Africa
- Height: 1.60 m (5 ft 3 in)
- Position: Midfielder

Team information
- Current team: Mamelodi Sundowns
- Number: 38

Youth career
- –: Happy Crown
- –: Newcastle All Stars
- –2023: Lamontville Golden Arrows Academy

Senior career*
Years	Team	Apps	(Gls)
2023–2026	Lamontville Golden Arrows	78	(8)
2026–	Mamelodi Sundowns		

International career^{‡}
2026–	South Africa	1	(0)
- * Club domestic league appearances and goals as of 21 September 2026 ‡ National team caps and goals as of 17 November 2026

Siyanda "Skhwishi" Ndlovu (né Mthanti; born 19 September 2002) is a South African professional footballer who plays as a right winger for Mamelodi Sundowns and the South Africa national team.

== Early life ==
Ndlovu was born in Dannhauser, KwaZulu‑Natal, where he developed through local football structures playing for the likes of Happy Crown in the SAFA Regional League and Newscastle All Stars in the SAFA Second Division before being scouted by Lamontville Golden Arrows for the DDC team. He made 29 appearances in the PSL Reserve League and scored 6 goals.

He changed his surname from Mthanti to Ndlovu at the start of the 2025–26 season.

== Club career ==
=== Lamontville Golden Arrows ===
Ndlovu joined the senior Arrows team in 2023, where he made his debut in a 1-all draw against Moraka Swallows on 5 August 2023. He played 75 matches, scoring 8 goals and providing 17 assists across league and cup competitions during his time at the club and earned a nomination for the Betway Premiership Goal of the Season in 2024–25 season.

=== Mamelodi Sundowns ===
Ndlovu signed for Mamelodi Sundowns on 4 July 2026. He was initially linked to Orlando Pirates with the player reveleaing her received death threats from fans for ditching the Soweto-based side in favour of Sundowns. He scored against his former team in a 2–1 league win with Ndlovu scoring the opener in the first half.

Ndlovu featured in the FIFA African–Asian–Pacific Cup when he came on in the 84th minute in a 2–1 over Asian champions Al Ahli to in this first trophy with the club.

== Honours ==
Mamelodi Sundowns

- MTN 8: 2026
- FIFA African–Asian–Pacific Cup: 2026
