= Nico Pretorius =

South African rugby union player

- Full name: Nicolaas Pretorius
- Born: 29 February 1984 (age 42) Pretoria, South Africa
- Height: 1.84 m (6 ft 1/2 in)
- Weight: 118 kg (18 st 8 lb; 260 lb)
- School: John Vorster Technical High School
- University: University of Pretoria

Rugby union career
- Position: Prop
Youth career
- 1997–2005: Blue Bulls
Senior career
Years	Team	Apps	(Points)
2006	Griffons	10	(0)
2007–2008	Falcons	20	(0)
2008–2009	Biarritz	6	(0)
2009–2010	Dax	7	(0)
2012–2015	Falcons	52	(5)
2013	→ Griquas	1	(0)
- Correct as of 23 March 2016

Nicolaas Pretorius (born 29 February 1984) is a South African professional rugby union player, who most recently played with the Falcons. His regular position is prop.

== Career ==
=== Blue Bulls ===
He played for the Blue Bulls at various youth levels, playing for them at Under-13 level in 1997, Under-16 level in 2000, for the Blue Bulls Amateur side in 2003 and 2004, at Under-20 level in 2004 and at Under-21 level in 2005. However, he never made an appearance for the senior side.

=== Griffons ===
He joined Welkom-based side Griffons in 2006 and made his first class debut for them in the 2006 Vodacom Cup match against the Falcons. His Currie Cup debut came against the Boland Cavaliers during the 2006 Currie Cup First Division season.

=== Falcons ===
He moved to the Falcons for the 2007 Currie Cup Premier Division season and made one appearance, as a substitute against the Sharks in Durban. He became a regular with them the following season, making 18 appearances in the Vodacom Cup and Currie Cup competitions.

=== France ===
He then moved to France, where he remained for two seasons, playing for Biarritz during the 2008–09 Top 14 season and for Dax during the 2009–10 Rugby Pro D2 season.

=== Return to Falcons ===
He returned to South Africa in 2012, rejoining former side Falcons, making more than thirty appearances for them during the 2012 and 2013 seasons.

=== Griquas ===
He also played one match on loan at Kimberley-based side Griquas during the 2013 Currie Cup Premier Division.
