= Rylands High School =

Rylands High School is a school in the Western Cape. Rylands High School is a co-educational public school located in Athlone, Cape Town, South Africa. Rylands High School offers a strong academic curriculum, a diverse sporting programme and a rich cultural programme.

In 2015, the school gained attention after bullying videos, shot at the school were reportedly shared widely on social media.

In 2022, the school was named one of 10 schools in the Western Cape added to the "Unheard Heritage" project, to be considered for national heritage status.
