= Dumisani Meslane =

South African rugby union player

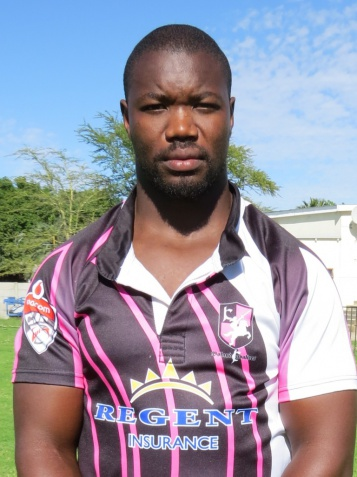
- Full name: Dumisani Kelvin Meslane
- Born: 11 May 1985 (age 41) Port Elizabeth, South Africa
- Height: 1.86 m (6 ft 1 in)
- Weight: 92 kg (14 st 7 lb; 203 lb)
- School: Ithembelihle High School
- University: Damelin

Rugby union career
- Position: Flanker
Youth career
- 2005–2006: Eastern Province Kings
Amateur team(s)
Years	Team	Apps	(Points)
2015–present	Despatch	7	(10)
Senior career
Years	Team	Apps	(Points)
2008–2010	Border Bulldogs	42	(35)
2011–2013	SWD Eagles	26	(40)
2014	Boland Cavaliers	10	(0)
2017–2018	Eastern Province Elephants	4	(0)
- Correct as of 24 May 2018

Dumisani Kelvin Meslane (born 11 May 1985) is a South African rugby union player who last played for the Eastern Province Elephants in the Currie Cup and in the Rugby Challenge. His regular position is flanker.

== Career ==
=== Youth ===
He played for Eastern Province Kings in the Under-21 Provincial Championship in 2005 and 2006 and for their Amateur side in 2007.

=== Senior career ===
In 2008, he joined the Border Bulldogs. He was an unused substitute in the opening game of the season against Griquas, but he did make his first class debut a week later when he started the game against the Griffons in Welkom. He stayed at the Border Bulldogs for three seasons, making 42 appearances in total for them.

He then moved to George to join the SWD Eagles in 2011.

After spending three years playing for the Eagles, he joined the Boland Cavaliers for the 2014 season.
