= Brendon April =

South African rugby union player

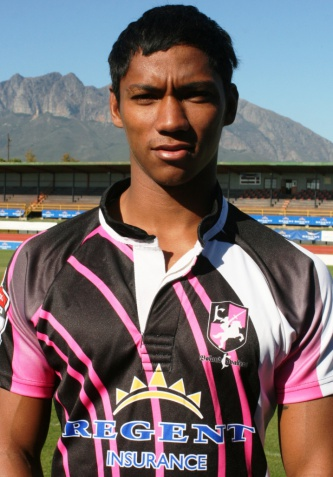
- Full name: Brendon Terence April
- Born: 20 December 1983 (age 42) Wellington, South Africa
- Height: 1.81 m (5 ft 11 1/2 in)
- Weight: 83 kg (13 st 1 lb; 183 lb)
- School: Berg River Secondary School, Wellington
- Notable relative: Garth April (brother)

Rugby union career
- Position: Winger
- Current team: Durbanville-Bellville
Youth career
- 2002–2003: Boland Cavaliers
Amateur team(s)
Years	Team	Apps	(Points)
2004, 2007–2014	Roses United		
2008	Maties	2	(0)
2015–present	Durbanville-Bellville	7	(20)
Senior career
Years	Team	Apps	(Points)
2005–2006	Falcons	32	(60)
2007	Griffons	2	(0)
2010–2014	Boland Cavaliers	67	(170)
- Correct as of 7 April 2015

Brendon Terence April (born 20 December 1993 in Wellington) is a South African rugby union player, currently playing with Western Province Premier League club side Durbanville-Bellville. His regular position is winger.

== Career ==
=== Youth and amateur rugby ===
April started off his career playing for the Boland club side Roses United and often played for them throughout his entire career. He also played for the Boland U19 side in 2002 and for their U20 side in 2003.

=== Falcons ===
He made the move to the East Rand in 2005, signing for the Falcons. He made senior debut during the 2005 Vodacom Cup competition, starting their match against Western Province. He also made his Currie Cup debut during the same season, scoring six tries in their First Division campaign. He was regular for them in the 2006 Vodacom Cup, scoring five tries to help the Falcons win the trophy – the first trophy in their history – and also qualify for the 2006 Currie Cup Premier Division, where April failed to score in five appearances. He made a total of 32 appearances for the Falcons in the Vodacom Cup and Currie Cup competitions, scoring twelve tries.

=== Griffons, Roses United and Maties ===
April moved to Welkom-based outfit the Griffons in 2007, where he made just two appearances for the side in the 2007 Vodacom Cup. He then returned to former amateur club side Roses United, where he played club rugby for the next few seasons.

In 2008, he was also included in the Maties side that won the inaugural Varsity Cup competition, starting the first two matches of their season.

=== Boland Cavaliers ===
His continuous try-scoring exploits for Roses United led to him returning to provincial rugby in 2010 with the Boland Cavaliers. He played in a compulsory friendly match against the Golden Lions, coming on as a second-half substitute and it just took him eight minutes to get a try for Boland. He established himself as a regular starter for his team over the next few seasons and kept up his try-scoring exploits, finishing as the top try scorer for the Cavaliers during the 2012 and 2013 Currie Cup seasons.

He was also the top try-scorer for Roses United at the 2014 SARU Community Cup tournament.

=== Durbanville-Bellville ===
In 2015, he joined Western Province club side Durbanville-Bellville and was a member of the squad that won the 2015 SARU Community Cup competition, scoring four tries in seven appearances in the competition.

== Personal ==
He is the older brother of rugby player Garth April.
