= Kempie Rautenbach =

South African rugby union player

- Full name: Cornelius Johannes Rautenbach
- Born: 25 April 1988 (age 38) Delmas, South Africa
- Height: 1.88 m (6 ft 2 in)
- Weight: 95 kg (14 st 13 lb; 209 lb)
- School: Afrikaans Boys' High School, Pretoria
- University: NWU Pukke

Rugby union career
- Position: Centre
- Current team: SWD Eagles
Youth career
- 2009: Leopards
Amateur team(s)
Years	Team	Apps	(Points)
2010–2011	NWU Pukke	10	(13)
Senior career
Years	Team	Apps	(Points)
2010–2011	Leopards	12	(0)
2011–present	SWD Eagles	23	(20)
- Correct as of 27 May 2013
International career
Years	Team	Apps	(Points)
2012	South African Barbarians (South)	1	(0)
- Correct as of 27 May 2013

Kempie Rautenbach (born 25 April 1988) is a South African rugby union player, currently playing with the SWD Eagles. His regular position is centre.

== Career ==
=== Youth ===
He was involved in the Under-21 Provincial Championship competition for Potchefstroom-based side Leopards in the 2009 season. In addition, he also played Varsity Cup rugby for the local university team NWU Pukke in 2010 and 2011.

=== Senior career ===
In 2010, he was included in the Leopards senior squad for the 2010 Currie Cup Premier Division competition. He made his first class debut against the Golden Lions and made nine appearances in total that season, including two starts in the promotion/relegation series against SWD Eagles, helping them retain their Premier Division status.

He also played for the Leopards in the 2011 Vodacom Cup, before he then made the move to George to join the SWD Eagles in time for the 2011 Currie Cup First Division season.
