= Ben Crouse =

- Born: 24 April 1983 (age 43) Port Elizabeth, South Africa
- Height: 1.76 m (5 ft 9 1/2 in)
- Weight: 75 kg (165 lb; 11 st 11 lb)
- School: Hoërskool Otto du Plessis

Rugby union career
Refereeing career
Years	Competition	Apps
2000–2006	Eastern Province Referees' Society	
2006–07	Contender Squad	
2008	National Panel	
2013–17	Men HSBC 7's Circuit	
2017–18	Women HSBC 7's Circuit	

Ben Crouse (born 24 April 1983) is a South African rugby union referee on the National A Panel of the South African Rugby Union.
