= Pro Legoete =

- Born: Lesego Legoete; 19 October 1976 (age 50) South Africa
- Height: 1.73 m (5 ft 8 in)
- Weight: 73 kg (161 lb)

Rugby union career
Refereeing career
Years	Competition	Apps
2007–present	Vodacom Cup	
2007–present	Currie Cup	
2010–2011	Super Rugby	
2012–present	Varsity Cup	
- Correct as of 14 April 2015

Lesego 'Pro' Legoete (born 19 October 1976) is a rugby referee on the TMO Panel of the South African Rugby Union.
