= Gareth Krause =

South African rugby union player

- Full name: Gareth Edward Krause
- Born: 30 December 1981 (age 44) East London, Eastern Cape, South Africa
- Height: 1.88 m (6 ft 2 in)
- Weight: 108 kg (17 st 0 lb; 238 lb)
- School: Dale College
- University: University of South Africa

Rugby union career
- Position: Flanker / No 8 / Lock
Youth career
- 2002: Border Bulldogs
Senior career
Years	Team	Apps	(Points)
2002–2003	Border Bulldogs	30	(30)
2004–2008	Griquas	97	(95)
2006	Cheetahs	7	(0)
2008–2009	Venezia	31	(10)
2009	Border Bulldogs	9	(0)
2009–2010	Viadana	20	(10)
2010–2011	Aironi	19	(15)
2012–2014	Border Bulldogs	45	(40)
- Correct as of 19 July 2014
International career
Years	Team	Apps	(Points)
2004–2005	South Africa Sevens		
- Correct as of 13 May 2013

Gareth Edward Krause (born 30 December 1981) is a South African rugby union player. His regular position is lock or flanker.

== Career ==
After representing the Border Bulldogs at Under–21 level, he made his first class debut for them in the 2002 Currie Cup competition and remained there for two seasons.

In 2004, he moved to Griquas, where he spent the next five seasons, making a total of 97 appearances. During this time, he was also included in the Cheetahs Super Rugby squad for their inaugural season in the competition in 2006. He was also included in the South Africa Sevens squad for the 2004–05 South Africa IRB Sevens World Series, playing in four tournaments, as well as the 2005 Rugby World Cup Sevens.

He then continued his playing career in Italy, where he spent four seasons, playing for Venezia, Viadana and Aironi, returning in 2008 for a short spell with Griquas and the following season for a short spell with the Border Bulldogs.

He made a permanent return to South African rugby in 2012, when he joined the Border Bulldogs for the third time.
