= JW Jonker =

South African rugby union player

- Full name: Jacobus Willem Jonker
- Born: 19 March 1987 (age 39) Bloemfontein, South Africa
- Height: 1.78 m (5 ft 10 in)
- Weight: 90 kg (14 st 2 lb; 198 lb)
- School: Grey College, Bloemfontein

Rugby union career
- Position: Centre
Youth career
- 2004–2007: Free State Cheetahs
Senior career
Years	Team	Apps	(Points)
2006–2010	Free State Cheetahs	65	(90)
2008–2009	Cheetahs	16	(30)
2010	→ Griffons	4	(30)
2011–2014	Pumas	56	(115)
2014	Lions	11	(0)
2015–2016	Griquas	19	(30)
2017	Cheetahs	1	(5)
2017	Free State XV	8	(25)
2017	Free State Cheetahs	8	(0)
2006–2017	Total	188	(325)
- Correct as of 22 April 2018
International career
Years	Team	Apps	(Points)
2007	South Africa Students	1	(0)
2012	South African Barbarians (North)	1	(0)
- Correct as of 22 April 2018

Jacobus Willem Jonker (born 19 March 1987) is a former South African rugby union footballer that played with the Cheetahs and Lions in Super Rugby and the Free State Cheetahs, Griffons, Pumas and Griquas in domestic rugby between 2006 and 2017.

== Rugby career ==
He plays mostly as a centre. He represented the Cheetahs in Super Rugby and the Free State Cheetahs. Griffons and Pumas in the Currie Cup and Vodacom Cup.

Jonker announced his retirement in 2013 due to a chronic ankle injury, aged 25. However, he returned to the playing field in 2014 and was included in the Lions squad for the 2014 Super Rugby season.

He played the remainder of the 2014 Currie Cup Premier Division season for the Pumas before signing a contract to join Griquas for the 2015 season and play for the Cheetahs in the 2015 Super Rugby season.

He retired in 2017.
