= Elric van Vuuren =

South African rugby union player

- Born: 8 April 1985 (age 41) Port Elizabeth, South Africa
- Height: 1.83 m (6 ft 0 in)
- Weight: 95 kg (209 lb; 14 st 13 lb)
- School: Despatch High School

Rugby union career
- Position: Fullback
- Current team: SWD Eagles
Youth career
- 2004–2005: Free State Cheetahs
Senior career
Years	Team	Apps	(Points)
2006, 2008	Mighty Elephants	24	(35)
2007	Border Bulldogs	10	(22)
2011–2015	SWD Eagles	58	(535)
2013	Southern Kings	2	(0)
- Correct as of 27 January 2016

Elric van Vuuren is a former South African rugby union player that played Currie Cup and Vodacom Cup rugby for the Mighty Elephants, Border Bulldogs and SWD Eagles between 2006 and 2015. He also made two appearances for the Southern Kings during the 2013 Super Rugby season. His regular position was full-back, centre or fly-half.

He was included in the Southern Kings squad for the 2013 Super Rugby season. After an injury to SP Marais in the game against the Chiefs, he was selected as part of the Kings tour squad to Australasia and made two substitute appearances – against the Crusaders and the Hurricanes. However, he then lost his place to Siviwe Soyizwapi and returned to the SWD Eagles, making three appearances for them in their 2013 Vodacom Cup season.

He retired from rugby union at the end of the 2015 season to take up a business opportunity in Port Elizabeth.
