= Werner Griesel =

South African rugby union player

- Born: 1 July 1986 (age 40) Welkom, South Africa
- Height: 1.78 m (5 ft 10 in)
- Weight: 90 kg (14 st 2 lb; 198 lb)
- School: Welkom Gymnasium
- University: University of the Free State

Rugby union career
- Position: Centre / Winger
- Current team: Griffons
Youth career
- 2004: Griffons
- 2005–2007: Free State Cheetahs
Senior career
Years	Team	Apps	(Points)
2008–present	Griffons	123	(130)
2011	→ Free State Cheetahs	1	(5)
- Correct as of 17 October 2014

Werner Griesel (born 1 July 1986) is a South African professional rugby union player, currently playing with the Griffons. His regular position is centre and he occasionally plays on the wing.

== Career ==
=== Youth ===
Griesel played first team rugby for his high school, Welkom Gymnasium, in 2003 and 2004, earning a call-up to the Griffons side that played at the 2004 Under-18 Craven Week tournament in Potchefstroom.

He enrolled at the Bloemfontein-based University of the Free State in 2005 where he appeared for the Free State U19 and for the Free State U21 side in 2006 and 2007.

=== Griffons ===
2008 saw Griesel return to Welkom to link up with the Griffons once again. He made his first class debut in the team's 51–7 defeat to Western Province in Bellville, with Griesel scoring the Griffons' only try of the match in the 75th minute. He firmly established himself as a first team regular for the Griffons, making in excess of 100 appearances for the side in Vodacom Cup and Currie Cup competitions over the next few years, captaining the side more than 50 times.

=== Free State Cheetahs ===
Griesel made one single first class appearance for a side other than the Griffons. Following an injury crisis at the Free State Cheetahs, Griesel was included in their 2011 Currie Cup Premier Division match against the Griquas. Griesel came on as a substitute with twenty minutes to go and scored a try within a minute of coming on with his first touch of the ball, to help the Cheetahs to a 49–39 victory in Bloemfontein.
