= JW Bell =

Spain international rugby union player (born 1990)

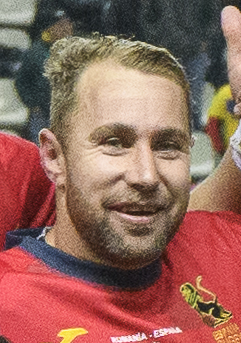
- Bell with Spain in 2024
- Born: John-Wessel Bell; 18 January 1990 (age 36) Cape Town, South Africa
- Height: 1.75 m (5 ft 9 in)
- Weight: 80 kg (12 st 8 lb; 176 lb)
- School: Eldoraigne High School
- University: University of Pretoria

Rugby union career
- Position: Full-Back / Wing
- Current team: Cape Town Harlequins RC
Youth career
- 2009–2010: Pumas
Senior career
Years	Team	Apps	(Points)
2011–2012	Falcons	29	(60)
2013–2015	Pumas	55	(95)
2016	Lions	2	(0)
2015-2016	Golden Lions	1	(5)
2016–2022	Valladolid RAC	36	(144)
2022–2025	CR El Salvador		
2025–	Cape Town Harlequins RC		
- Correct as of 17 February 2026
International career
Years	Team	Apps	(Points)
2019–	Spain	30	(40)
- Correct as of 17 February 2026

John-Wessel Bell (born 18 January 1990) is a professional rugby union player who plays for Cape Town Harlequins RC. Born in South Africa, he played for the Spain national rugby union team.

Bell is a utility back who can play as a full-back, wing or fly-half.

He was a member of the Pumas side that won the Vodacom Cup for the first time in 2015, beating Western Province 24–7 in the final. Bell made seven appearances during the season, scoring one try.

He signed a contract to join Johannesburg-based side the Golden Lions prior to the 2016 season.

After the 2016 Currie Cup, Bell played for Spanish División de Honor side Valladolid until 2022, when he signed for the city's rival team, CR El Salvador.

== International career ==
On 23 November 2019, he made his debut for h the Spanish National Team in a test match against Hong Kong in the National Stadium Complutense.

He represented Spain in several editions of the Rugby Europe International Championships and the qualifiers for the World Cups in 2023 and 2027, where Spain qualified after beating the Netherlands and Switzerland. He announced his international retirement on 18 February 2025 aged 35, having won 25 official caps and scoring 40 points.

On June 6, 2025, his departure from CR El Salvador of the División de Honor rugby team was announced, to return to his homeland, South Africa, signing for Cape Town Harlequins RC. After leaving the Valladolid team, he asked the Spanish Rugby Federation to revoke his resignation from joining the Spanish national team, claiming that the family problems he was facing had been resolved.
