= PJ van Zyl =

South African rugby union player

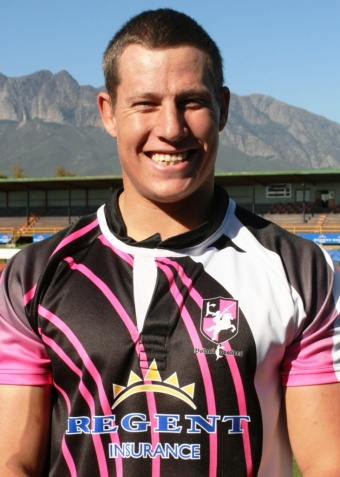
- Full name: Philippus Jacobus van Zyl
- Born: 23 April 1988 (age 38) Rustenburg, South Africa
- Height: 1.93 m (6 ft 4 in)
- Weight: 107 kg (16 st 12 lb; 236 lb)
- School: Hoërskool Bergsig, Rustenburg
- University: North-West University

Rugby union career
- Position: Lock / Flanker / Number 8
- Current team: SWD Eagles
Youth career
- 2007: Golden Lions
- 2009: Leopards
Amateur team(s)
Years	Team	Apps	(Points)
2010	NWU Pukke	4	(10)
Senior career
Years	Team	Apps	(Points)
2011–2014	Boland Cavaliers	65	(50)
2014–2015	Chalon	7	(5)
2016–present	Agronomia		
- Correct as of 5 October 2014

Philippus Jacobus van Zyl (born 23 April 1988 in Rustenburg, South Africa) is a South African rugby union player, currently playing with Portuguese Campeonato Português de Rugby side Agronomia. His is a utility forward that can play as a lock, a flanker or a number eight.

== Career ==
=== Youth and Varsity rugby ===
Van Zyl was part of the Golden Lions U19 squad in 2007 and the Leopards U21 squad in 2009. In 2010, he also played Varsity Cup rugby with the NWU Pukke, making four appearances.

=== Boland Cavaliers ===
At the start of 2011, Van Zyl joined Wellington-based side Boland Cavaliers. He made his debut for the team during the 2011 Vodacom Cup competition, a 25–42 defeat to Griquas in Bredasdorp in the Cavaliers' opening match of the competition. Van Zyl was on the field for less than ten minutes when he scored his first senior try.

He soon established himself as a regular starter for Boland in both the Vodacom Cup and Currie Cup competitions and reached his half-century of appearances during the 2013 Currie Cup First Division season.

=== Chalon ===
At the conclusion of the 2014 Currie Cup First Division, Van Zyl moved to France to join Fédérale 1 side Chalon.
