= Lourens van der Merwe =

- Born: South Africa

Rugby union career
Refereeing career
Years	Competition	Apps
2011–present	Super Rugby	
2011–present	Currie Cup	

Lourens van der Merwe is a rugby referee on the TMO Panel of the South African Rugby Union.
