= 2007 Currie Cup First Division =

Domestic rugby union competition

- Countries: South Africa
- Date: 22 June – 6 October 2007
- Champions: SWD Eagles (2nd title)
- Runners-up: Mighty Elephants
- Promoted: None
- Matches played: 33
- Tries scored: 233 (average 7.1 per match)
- Top point scorer: PD Terblanche (129)
- Top try scorer: Cecil Afrika (11)

The 2007 Currie Cup First Division was contested from 22 June to 6 October 2007. The tournament (also known as the Absa Currie Cup First Division for sponsorship reasons) is the second tier of South Africa's premier domestic rugby union competition, featuring teams representing either entire provinces or substantial regions within provinces.

== Competition ==
=== Regular season and title playoffs ===
There were six participating teams in the 2007 Currie Cup First Division. These teams played each other twice over the course of the season, once at home and once away.

Teams received four points for a win and two points for a draw. Bonus points were awarded to teams that scored 4 or more tries in a game, as well as to teams losing a match by 7 points or less. Teams were ranked by points, then points difference (points scored less points conceded).

The top 4 teams qualified for the title play-offs. In the semifinals, the team that finished first had home advantage against the team that finished fourth, while the team that finished second had home advantage against the team that finished third. The winners of these semi-finals played each other in the final, at the home venue of the higher-placed team.

=== Promotion playoffs ===
The top two teams on the log also qualified for the promotion/relegation play-offs. The team that finished first played off against the team placed eighth in the 2007 Currie Cup Premier Division and the team that finished second played off against the team that finished seventh in the Premier Division. The two winners over these two ties (determined via team tables, with all Currie Cup ranking regulations in effect) qualified for the 2008 Currie Cup Premier Division, while the losing teams qualified for the 2008 Currie Cup First Division.

== Teams ==
Location of teams in 2007 Currie Cup First Division

2007 Currie Cup First Division teams
Team	Sponsored Name	Stadium/s	Sponsored Name
Border Bulldogs	Bulldogs	Buffalo City Stadium, East London	ABSA Stadium
Griffons	Griffons	North West Stadium, Welkom	North West Stadium
Leopards	Impala Leopards	Olën Park, Potchefstroom	Santam Olën Park
Mighty Elephants	British Airways Mighty Elephants	EPRU Stadium, Port Elizabeth	EPRU Stadium
Pumas	Witbank Mica Pumas	Puma Stadium, Witbank	Witbank Mica Stadium
SWD Eagles	SWD Eagles	Outeniqua Park, George	Outeniqua Park

== Log ==
=== Final standings ===
2007 Currie Cup First Division log
Pos	Team	Pld	W	D	L	PF	PA	PD	TF	TA	TB	LB	Pts	Qualification
1	SWD Eagles	10	9	0	1	255	179	+76	35	20	5	0	41	Semi-finals
2	Mighty Elephants	10	6	0	4	265	277	−12	34	37	5	1	30	Semi-finals
3	Griffons	10	5	1	4	331	330	+1	41	43	4	1	27	Semi-finals
4	Pumas	10	4	1	5	300	287	+13	40	36	5	3	26	Semi-finals
5	Leopards	10	3	1	6	268	298	−30	35	41	4	3	21	
6	Border Bulldogs	10	1	1	8	229	277	−48	27	35	2	5	13	

Rules for classification: 4 points for a win; 2 points for a draw; 1 bonus point for a loss by seven points or less; 1 bonus point for scoring four or more tries in a match

=== Round-by-round ===
Team Progression – 2007 Currie Cup First Division
Team	R1	R2	R3	R4	R5	R6	R7	R8	R9	R10	R11	R12	SF	F
SWD Eagles	—	4 (4th)	9 (2nd)	13 (1st)	18 (1st)	22 (1st)	22 (1st)	27 (1st)	32 (1st)	36 (1st)	41 (1st)	41 (1st)	Won	Won
Mighty Elephants	5 (1st)	6 (2nd)	10 (1st)	11 (3rd)	11 (3rd)	12 (4th)	16 (3rd)	20 (3rd)	21 (3rd)	26 (2nd)	26 (2nd)	30 (2nd)	Won	Lost
Griffons	4 (2nd)	9 (1st)	9 (3rd)	13 (2nd)	13 (2nd)	18 (2nd)	21 (2nd)	22 (2nd)	22 (2nd)	22 (3rd)	22 (4th)	27 (3rd)	Lost	—
Pumas	—	5 (3rd)	6 (4th)	7 (4th)	9 (4th)	10 (5th)	10 (5th)	14 (5th)	19 (4th)	20 (4th)	25 (3rd)	26 (4th)	Lost	—
Leopards	1 (3rd)	1 (5th)	1 (5th)	6 (5th)	7 (5th)	12 (3rd)	15 (4th)	16 (4th)	16 (5th)	16 (5th)	16 (5th)	21 (5th)	—	—
Border Bulldogs	1 (4th)	1 (6th)	1 (6th)	2 (6th)	4 (6th)	5 (6th)	6 (6th)	6 (6th)	6 (6th)	11 (6th)	12 (6th)	13 (6th)	—	—
The table above shows a team's progression throughout the season. For each round, each team's cumulative points total is shown with the overall log position in brackets.
Key:	win	draw	loss	bye										

== Results ==
The results of all the matches played in the 2007 Currie Cup First Division were as follows:

All times are South African (GMT+2).

=== Round one ===
22 June 2007	Leopards	24–25	Griffons	Olën Park, Potchefstroom
19:00	Try: Anvor Schooney 45'; Warren Clive Petersen 62'; Con: Corné Meyer 46' (1/2); Pen: Corné Meyer 13', 25', 48', 70' (4/8)	Scoreboard	Try: Japie Nel 15'; Cecil Afrika 27'; Stevie Meyer 43'; Con: PD Terblanche 16', 44' (2/3); Pen: PD Terblanche 9', 79' (2/4); Drop: PD Terblanche (0/1)	Attendance: 1,000; Referee: Jerome Fortuin

22 June 2007	Mighty Elephants	29–23	Border Bulldogs	EPRU Stadium, Port Elizabeth
19:00	Try: Michael van Huyssteen 17'; Fabian Juries 20'; Luvo Sogidashe 36'; Norman Nelson 58'; Con: Chris Jonck 18', 21', 37' (3/4); Pen: Chris Jonck 70' (1/4); Cards: Luke Belling (yellow card) 73'	Scoreboard	Try: Eddie Johannes Swart 46'; Lonwabo Mtimka 66'; Con: Reinhardt Gerber 47', 67' (2/2); Pen: Reinhardt Gerber 14', 40', 74' (3/4); Cards: Eddie Johannes Swart (yellow card) 69' to 79'	Attendance: 280

Bye/s: Pumas, SWD Eagles

=== Round two ===
29 June 2007	Border Bulldogs	16–24	SWD Eagles	Buffalo City Stadium, East London
19:00	Try: Brendan Lee Spring 3'; Joshua John Fowles 76'; Con: Reinhardt Gerber (0/1); Elric van Vuuren (0/1); Pen: Reinhardt Gerber 29', 34' (2/2)	Scoreboard	Try: Hendrik van der Nest 14' penalty try 43'; Spencer Pearson Wakeling 52'; Con: Ambrose Barends 15', 44', 53' (3/3); Pen: Ambrose Barends 71' (1/1); Cards: Nicky van der Walt (yellow card) 69'; Jaco Terblanche (yellow card) 73'	Attendance: 2,500; Referee: Jerome Fortuin

30 June 2007	Pumas	34–26	Leopards	Puma Stadium, Witbank
15:00	Try: Corné Steenkamp 11'; Ruan Lamprecht 39'; Rassie Jansen van Vuuren 61'; Quintin Jean van Tonder 64'; Gordon Xavier Pangetti 79'; Con: Rudi Vogt 40' (1/2); Marc de Marigny 65', 80' (2/3); Pen: Marc de Marigny 76' (1/1)	Scoreboard	Try: Deon van Rensburg 30'; Rayno Hendricks 44'; Warren Clive Petersen 91'; Con: Corné Meyer (0/2); Anvor Schooney 92' (1/1); Pen: Corné Meyer 17' (1/1); Anvor Schooney 47' (1/1); Drop: Corné Meyer 7' (1/1)	Attendance: 300; Referee: Christian (Christie) du Preez

30 June 2007	Griffons	50–29	Mighty Elephants	North West Stadium, Welkom
16:00	Try: Japie Nel 7', 32', 58'; Pieter Frederick Nel 39'; Stevie Meyer 43'; Dougie Hellmuth 65'; Barend Johannes Marthinus Britz 72'; Con: PD Terblanche 33', 40', 44', 59', 66', 73' (6/7); Pen: PD Terblanche 46' (1/1)	Scoreboard	Try: Fabian Juries 3', 52'; Elroy Ligman 24'; Noel Richard de Villiers 78'; Con: Chris Jonck 4', 24', 53' (3/4); Pen: Chris Jonck 26' (1/1)	Attendance: 150; Referee: Linston Manuels

=== Round three ===
6 July 2007	SWD Eagles	33–12	Griffons	Outeniqua Park, George
17:00	Try: Leon de Villiers 44'; Ashwin Scott 68'; Spencer Pearson Wakeling 73'; Ricardo Pietersen 84'; Con: Ambrose Barends 45', 74' (2/4); Pen: Ambrose Barends 4', 34' (2/2); Drop: Ashwin Scott 19' (1/1); Cards: Nicky van der Walt (yellow card) 57' to 67'; Charl Kitching (yellow card) 81' to 88'	Scoreboard	Try: Cecil Afrika 82'; Andries Kruger 87'; Con: Marcel du Toit 88' (1/2); Pen: PD Terblanche (0/1); Cards: Gert Johannes Greyling (yellow card) 70' to 80'	Referee: Linston Manuels

7 July 2007	Mighty Elephants	22–21	Pumas	EPRU Stadium, Port Elizabeth
	Try: Michael Killian 54'; Luvo Sogidashe 59'; Norman Nelson 62'; Con: Chris Jonck 60', 63' (2/3); Pen: Chris Jonck 6' (1/3); Cards: Os Van der Walt (yellow card) 28' to 44'; Paul Serfontein (yellow card) 66'	Scoreboard	Try: Jacques Coetzee 33'; Rassie Jansen van Vuuren 75'; Ashton Constant 79'; Con: Riaan Smit 34', 76', 80' (3/3); Cards: Hyron Thyse (yellow card) 51' to 61'	Referee: Gareth Lloyd-Jones

Bye/s: Border Bulldogs, Leopards

=== Round four ===
20 July 2007	Pumas	18–25	SWD Eagles	Puma Stadium, Witbank
19:00	Try: Hyron Thyse 43'; Rassie Jansen van Vuuren 89'; Con: Riaan Smit 44' (1/2); Pen: Riaan Smit 5', 12' (2/2); Cards: Ruan Lamprecht (yellow card) 50' to 59'	Scoreboard	Try: Hannes Franklin 16'; Leon de Villiers 48'; Ashwin Scott 56'; Con: Ambrose Barends 49', 57' (2/3); Pen: Ambrose Barends 53' (1/2); Jannie Viljoen 73' (1/1)	Attendance: 600; Referee: Brett Bowden

21 July 2007	Leopards	48–37	Mighty Elephants	Olën Park, Potchefstroom
15:30	Try: Corné Meyer 8', 60'; Bom Samaai 13'; Anvor Schooney 49', 64'; Andries Mahoney 79'; Con: Corné Meyer 9', 14', 50', 61', 65', 79' (6/6); Pen: Corné Meyer 37' (1/1); Drop: Corné Meyer 31' (1/1)	Scoreboard	Try: Luvo Sogidashe 5', 12'; Michael van Huyssteen 29'; Willie Bower 34'; Norman Nelson 80'; Con: Chris Jonck 13', 29', 35' (3/5); Pen: Chris Jonck 26', 40' (2/3)	Attendance: 1,000; Referee: Deon van Blommestein

21 July 2007	Griffons	28–27	Border Bulldogs	North West Stadium, Welkom
16:00	Try: Cecil Afrika 37', 53'; Japie Nel 56'; Con: Marcel du Toit (0/1); PD Terblanche 53', 57' (2/2); Pen: Marcel du Toit (0/1); PD Terblanche 44', 64', 67' (3/4); Cards: Pieter Frederick Nel (yellow card) 48'; Sarel Louw (yellow card) 55'	Scoreboard	Try: Vuyo Zangqa 32', 40'; Oliver Peter Fowles 70'; Con: Elric van Vuuren 33', 40' (2/2); Stuart Hudson 71' (1/1); Pen: Elric van Vuuren 11', 15' (2/2); Oliver Peter Fowles (0/2); Cards: Brendan Lee Spring (yellow card) 19'; Sinethemba Zweni (yellow card) 64'	Attendance: 250; Referee: Pro Legoete

=== Round Five ===
27 July 2007	Border Bulldogs	19–19	Pumas	Buffalo City Stadium, East London
19:00	Try: Lungelo Payi 78'; Con: Oliver Peter Fowles 79' (1/1); Pen: Oliver Peter Fowles 2', 45', 51', 82' (4/4); Drop: Vuyo Zangqa (0/1); Cards: Lonwabo Mtimka (yellow card) 18' to 28'	Scoreboard	Try: Jacques Coetzee 4'; Con: Riaan Smit 5' (1/1); Pen: Riaan Smit 11', 20', 35', 40' (4/4); Drop: Kennedy Tsimba (0/1); Cards: Marc de Marigny (yellow card) 80'	Attendance: 500; Referee: Linston Manuels

28 July 2007	SWD Eagles	27–21	Leopards	Outeniqua Park, George
15:00	Try: Henry Grimes 14'; Hannes Franklin 30', 65'; Ambrose Barends 73'; Hendrik van der Nest 77'; Con: Ambrose Barends 66' (1/4); Jannie Viljoen (0/1); Pen: Ambrose Barends (0/1)	Scoreboard	Try: Jaco Bouwer 8'; Anvor Schooney 40'; Deon van Rensburg 56'; Con: Corné Meyer 9', 41', 57' (3/3); Cards: Morné Basson (yellow card) 24' to 34'; Nardus Lombaard (yellow card) 28' to 40'	Attendance: 150; Referee: Gareth Lloyd-Jones

Bye/s: Griffons, Mighty Elephants

=== Round Six ===
3 August 2007	Leopards	25–21	Border Bulldogs	Olympia Park, Rustenburg
19:00	Try: Theo van Wyk 16'; Morné Basson 43'; Warren Clive Petersen 50'; Colin Lloyd 64'; Con: Corné Meyer 44' (1/3); Anvor Schooney (0/1); Pen: Corné Meyer 20' (1/5); Cards: Edrich Linde (yellow card) 31' to 41'	Scoreboard	Try: Sinethemba Zweni 34', 79'; Pieter Loots 55'; Con: Oliver Peter Fowles 35', 56', 80' (3/3); Pen: Oliver Peter Fowles (0/1)	Attendance: 400; Referee: Pro Legoete

3 August 2007	Pumas	43–60	Griffons	Puma Stadium, Witbank
19:00	Try: Jacques Coetzee 7'; Marc de Marigny 28'; Christiaan Els 52', 74'; Ross Geldenhuys 61'; Kennedy Tsimba 77'; Con: Riaan Smit 8', 53', 62', 75', 78' (5/6); Pen: Riaan Smit 2' (1/1)	Scoreboard	Try: Jaun de Wit 5', 16'; Hannes Tredoux 30', 84'; Dougie Hellmuth 40', 56'; Cecil Afrika 49'; Jaco du Toit 58'; Pieter Frederick Nel 68'; Con: PD Terblanche 6', 31', 41', 57', 69', 84' (6/9); Pen: PD Terblanche 38' (1/2)	Attendance: 300; Referee: Mark Lawrence

4 August 2007	Mighty Elephants	6–13	SWD Eagles	EPRU Stadium, Port Elizabeth
15:30	Pen: Chris Jonck 1', 11' (2/3); Cards: Andries Adriaan Smit (yellow card) 66' to 78'	Scoreboard	Try: Hendrik van der Nest 67'; Con: Ambrose Barends 68' (1/1); Pen: Ambrose Barends 24', 51' (2/3); Cards: Jaco (SWD25`04) Terblanche (yellow card) 52' to 63'	Attendance: 250; Referee: Marius Jonker

=== Round Seven ===
10 August 2007	Border Bulldogs	22–25	Mighty Elephants	Buffalo City Stadium, East London
19:00	Try: Vuyo Zangqa 5'; Oliver Peter Fowles 34', 38'; Con: Oliver Peter Fowles 6', 39' (2/3); Pen: Oliver Peter Fowles 13' (1/2); Reinhardt Gerber (0/1); Cards: Lungelo Payi (yellow card) 60'; Brett Nel (yellow card) 68'	Scoreboard	Try: Michael Killian 20'; RW Kember 49', 61'; Con: Chris Jonck 21', 62' (2/3); Pen: Chris Jonck 28', 65' (2/2)	Attendance: 600; Referee: Jerome Fortuin

11 August 2007	Griffons	37–37	Leopards	North West Stadium, Welkom
16:00	Try: Sarel Louw 15', 83'; Christo van Niekerk 30'; Pieter Frederick Nel 37'; PD Terblanche 55'; Con: PD Terblanche 15', 38', 83' (3/5); Pen: PD Terblanche 54', 71' (2/2)	Scoreboard	Try: Colin Lloyd 9'; Bom Samaai 20', 65'; Jaco Bouwer 74'; Con: Corné Meyer 10', 21', 66' (3/3); Anvor Schooney 75' (1/1); Pen: Corné Meyer 34', 39' (2/3); Anvor Schooney 77' (1/1); Drop: Andries Mahoney (0/1)	Attendance: 1,500; Referee: Christie du Preez

Bye/s: Pumas, SWD Eagles

=== Round Eight ===
17 August 2007	SWD Eagles	25–10	Border Bulldogs	Outeniqua Park, George
17:00	Try: Hendrik van der Nest 17'; Izak Saayman 63'; Shawn Michael Minnie 83'; Hannes Franklin 88'; Con: Ambrose Barends 64' (1/3); Jannie Viljoen (0/1); Pen: Ambrose Barends 40' (1/1); Cards: Theo Bezuidenhout (yellow card) 21'	Scoreboard	Try: Russel Jeacocks 66'; Con: Reinhardt Gerber 67' (1/1); Pen: Reinhardt Gerber 23' (1/2); Luzuko Velentiya (0/1)	Attendance: 500; Referee: Linston Manuels

18 August 2007	Leopards	22–24	Pumas	Olën Park, Potchefstroom
16:00	Try: Anvor Schooney 1', 73'; Rayno Hendricks 18'; Con: Anvor Schooney 19', 74' (2/3); Pen: Anvor Schooney 33' (1/3); Cards: Zeine Reynders (yellow card) 40' to 51'	Scoreboard	Try: Hyron Thyse 45'; Riaan Smit 51'; Con: Riaan Smit 51' (1/2); Pen: Riaan Smit 8', 26', 36', 55' (4/4)	Attendance: 500; Referee: Deon van Blommestein

18 August 2007	Mighty Elephants	25–20	Griffons	EPRU Stadium, Port Elizabeth
19:00	Try: Liaan Scriven 13'; Basil de Doncker 40'; Deon Booysen 57'; Con: Chris Jonck 14', 58' (2/3); Pen: Chris Jonck 7', 24' (2/2)	Scoreboard	Try: Philippus Jacobus Steyn 32', 73'; Con: PD Terblanche 33', 74' (2/2); Pen: PD Terblanche 16', 37' (2/2); Drop: Marcel du Toit (0/1)	Attendance: 400; Referee: Gareth Lloyd-Jones

=== Round Nine ===
1 September 2007	Griffons	30–43	SWD Eagles	North West Stadium, Welkom
16:00	Try: Cecil Afrika 8'; Leonard van der Merwe 24'; Japie Nel 37'; Con: PD Terblanche 9', 25', 38' (3/3); Pen: PD Terblanche 19', 40', 47' (3/4)	Scoreboard	Try: Izak Saayman 12'; Allister Kettledas 29', 72'; Nicky van der Walt 34'; Hannes Franklin 44', 59'; Ambrose Barends 80'; Con: Ambrose Barends 13', 30', 45', 60' (4/6); Warren Malgas (0/1); Pen: Ambrose Barends (0/1); Drop: Jaco (SWD25`04) Terblanche (0/1)	Attendance: 400; Referee: Jaco Peyper

1 September 2007	Pumas	48–24	Mighty Elephants	Puma Stadium, Witbank
16:00	Try: Jacques Lombaard 6', 18'; Sasha Marot 20', 71'; Rassie Jansen van Vuuren 42', 46'; Morné Kruger 53'; Maurice Oliver Reid 87'; Con: Riaan Smit 54' (1/3); Kennedy Tsimba 19', 21' (2/4); Rudi Vogt 88' (1/1); Pen: Riaan Smit (0/2); Drop: Kennedy Tsimba (0/1); Cards: Rassie Jansen van Vuuren (yellow card) 26' to 36'; Hyron Thyse (yellow card) 26' to 36'; Ashton Constant (yellow card) 73' to 83'	Scoreboard	Try: Norman Nelson 30'; Fabian Smith 49', 80'; Os Van der Walt 60'; Con: Chris Jonck 31', 61' (2/4); Cards: Fabian Smith (yellow card) 63' to 73'	Attendance: 400; Referee: Francois Veldsman

Bye/s: Border Bulldogs, Leopards

=== Round Ten ===
8 September 2007	Mighty Elephants	34–15	Leopards	EPRU Stadium, Port Elizabeth
15:30	Try: Norman Nelson 9', 35'; Basil de Doncker 17', 64'; Chris Jonck 71'; Con: Chris Jonck 10', 18', 36' (3/5); Pen: Chris Jonck 77' (1/1); Cards: Paul Serfontein (yellow card) 46' to 56'; Elvino Gertro Koetaan (yellow card) 56'	Scoreboard	Try: Warren Clive Petersen 57'; BW van Dyk 59'; Bom Samaai 74'; Con: Corné Meyer (0/2); Renier Schoeman (0/1)	Attendance: 150; Referee: Linston Manuels

8 September 2007	Border Bulldogs	34–26	Griffons	Buffalo City Stadium, East London
17:00	Try: Eddie Johannes Swart 12'; Kaunda Ntunja 14', 70'; Oliver Peter Fowles 22'; Russel Jeacocks 38'; Con: Reinhardt Gerber 13', 23', 71' (3/5); Pen: Reinhardt Gerber 32' (1/1); Drop: Sinethemba Zweni (0/1); Reinhardt Gerber (0/1); Cards: Lungelo Payi (yellow card) 66'	Scoreboard	Try: Japie Nel 27'; Cecil Afrika 75'; Con: PD Terblanche 28', 76' (2/2); Pen: PD Terblanche 10', 17', 46', 66' (4/4); Cards: Sarel Louw (red card) 42'	Attendance: 300; Referee: Christian (Christie) du Preez

8 September 2007	SWD Eagles	14–8	Pumas	Outeniqua Park, George
17:00	Try: Allister Kettledas 25'; Con: Jannie Viljoen (0/1); Pen: Jannie Viljoen 22' (1/2); Danie de Beer 53', 89' (2/2)	Scoreboard	Try: Riaan Juan Kruger 66'; Con: Riaan Smit (0/1); Pen: Riaan Smit 48' (1/1); Cards: Stephan Gerber (yellow card) 62' to 76'	Attendance: 300; Referee: Jerome Fortuin

=== Round Eleven ===
14 September 2007	Pumas	50–32	Border Bulldogs	Puma Stadium, Witbank
18:00	Try: Christiaan Els 5'; Maurice Oliver Reid 7', 36'; Gordon Xavier Pangetti 23'; Ruan Lamprecht 50'; Ross Geldenhuys 63'; Morné Kruger 84'; Con: Kennedy Tsimba 6', 8', 37', 51', 64', 85' (6/7); Pen: Kennedy Tsimba 44' (1/1); Cards: Ruan Lamprecht (yellow card) 72'	Scoreboard	Try: Jarrod Edward Taylor 41'; Oliver Peter Fowles 71', 74'; Stuart Hudson 76'; Con: Reinhardt Gerber 42', 71', 74' (3/4); Pen: Reinhardt Gerber 9', 26' (2/2)	Attendance: 100; Referee: Gareth Lloyd-Jones

15 September 2007	Leopards	24–34	SWD Eagles	Olën Park, Potchefstroom
16:00	Try: Lionelle Van Staden 19'; Deon van Rensburg 26', 44'; Con: Clayton Durand 20', 27', 45' (3/3); Pen: Clayton Durand 48' (1/1); Cards: Schalk Mattheys Van Jaarsveld (yellow card) 60' to 70'	Scoreboard	Try: Davon Raubenheimer 3'; Hendrik van der Nest 11'; Warren Malgas 53'; Nicky van der Walt 62'; Danie de Beer 64'; Con: Danie de Beer 4', 54', 65' (3/5); Pen: Danie de Beer (0/1); Drop: Danie de Beer 72' (1/1)	Attendance: 500; Referee: Pro Legoete

Bye/s: Griffons, Mighty Elephants

=== Round Twelve ===
21 September 2007	Border Bulldogs	25–26	Leopards	Buffalo City Stadium, East London
19:00	Try: Pieter Loots 20'; Peter William Featherstone 25'; Stuart Hudson 39'; Con: Reinhardt Gerber 21', 40' (2/3); Pen: Reinhardt Gerber 3', 28' (2/4); Cards: Lonwabo Mtimka (yellow card) 72'	Scoreboard	Try: Warren Clive Petersen 14'; Deon van Rensburg 42'; Rayno Hendricks 58'; Corné Meyer 73'; Con: Clayton Durand 42' (1/2); Corné Meyer 59', 74' (2/2); Pen: Clayton Durand (0/1); Cards: Bennie Adams (yellow card) 72'	Referee: Deon van Blommestein

22 September 2007	Griffons	43–35	Pumas	North West Stadium, Welkom
16:00	Try: Jaun de Wit 2'; Cecil Afrika 19', 31', 74'; Gys Briedenhann 38'; Con: PD Terblanche 3', 20', 32' (3/4); Marcel du Toit (0/1); Pen: PD Terblanche 26', 30', 36', 43' (4/4)	Scoreboard	Try: Jacques Coetzee 9'; Stephan Gerber 52'; Ashton Constant 56'; Marc de Marigny 67'; Sean Johnson 71'; Con: Kennedy Tsimba 10' (1/1); Rudi Vogt 52', 57', 67', 72' (4/4); Cards: Ross Geldenhuys (yellow card) 42' to 53'; Stephan Gerber (yellow card) 70'	Attendance: 259; Referee: Jerome Fortuin

22 September 2007	SWD Eagles	17–34	Mighty Elephants	Outeniqua Park, George
17:00	Try: Ashley Buys 30'; Bennie van Vuuren 73'; Con: Danie de Beer 31' (1/1); Ambrose Barends 74' (1/1); Pen: Danie de Beer 1' (1/3); Drop: Ashwin Scott (0/1); Cards: Danie de Beer (yellow card) 34' to 46'; Willem Johannes Harmse (yellow card) 52' to 62'	Scoreboard	Try: William Fick 22'; Norman Nelson 56'; RW Kember 86'; Con: Chris Jonck 57', 87' (2/3); Pen: Chris Jonck 6', 38', 48', 53', 81' (5/6); Cards: Michael Killian (yellow card) 70' to 81'	Attendance: 500; Referee: Linston Manuels

=== Semi-finals ===
28 September 2007	SWD Eagles	37–12	Pumas	Outeniqua Park, George
17:00	Try: Spencer Pearson Wakeling 11'; Hendrik van der Nest 17', 58'; Hannes Franklin 79'; Ambrose Barends 89'; Con: Danie de Beer 12', 18', 59' (3/5); Pen: Danie de Beer 9', 40' (2/2); Cards: Leon de Villiers (yellow card) 39' to 50'; Izak Saayman (yellow card) 51' to 62'	Scoreboard	Try: Danzel Manuel 5'; Barend du Plessis 61'; Con: Rudi Vogt 62' (1/2); Cards: Gordon Xavier Pangetti (yellow card) 67' to 77'; Danzel Manuel (yellow card) 78' to 88'	Attendance: 500; Referee: Christian (Christie) du Preez

29 September 2007	Mighty Elephants	43–30	Griffons	EPRU Stadium, Port Elizabeth
15:30	Try: Norman Nelson 17'; Elroy Ligman 35'; Noel Richard de Villiers 39'; Michael Killian 43', 65'; William Fick 55'; Fabian Smith 63'; Con: Chris Jonck 36', 40', 56', 66' (4/7); Pen: Chris Jonck (0/1)	Scoreboard	Try: Cecil Afrika 22'; Stanley Victor Stevens 27'; Dougie Hellmuth 74'; Con: Gideon Jacobus Goosen 23', 28', 75' (3/3); Pen: Gideon Jacobus Goosen 6', 46', 57' (3/4)	Attendance: 530; Referee: Deon van Blommestein

=== Final ===
6 October 2007	SWD Eagles	38–3	Mighty Elephants	Outeniqua Park, George
17:05	Try: Jonathan Richard Muller 30'; Izak Saayman 40'; Danie de Beer 42'; Ashwin Scott 79'; Con: Danie de Beer 31', 40', 43' (3/3); Ambrose Barends (0/1); Pen: Danie de Beer 8', 26' (2/2); Ambrose Barends 55', 63' (2/2); Drop: Valentine van Wyk (0/1)	Scoreboard	Drop: Liaan Scriven 20' (1/1)	Referee: Willie Roos

2007 Absa Currie Cup
First Division Champions
SWD Eagles
2nd title

== Players ==
=== Player statistics ===
The following table contain points which have been scored in the 2007 Currie Cup First Division.

All point scorers
No	Player	Team	T	C	P	DG	Pts
1	PD Terblanche	Griffons	1	29	22	0	129
2	Chris Jonck	Mighty Elephants	1	26	17	0	108
3	Corné Meyer	Leopards	3	16	9	2	80
4	Ambrose Barends	SWD Eagles	3	15	9	0	72
5	Riaan Smit	Pumas	1	12	12	0	65
6	Oliver Peter Fowles	Border Bulldogs	6	6	5	0	57
7	Cecil Afrika	Griffons	11	0	0	0	55
8	Reinhardt Gerber	Border Bulldogs	0	11	11	0	55
9	Danie de Beer	SWD Eagles	2	10	7	1	54
10	Anvor Schooney	Leopards	6	4	3	0	47
11	Norman Nelson	Mighty Elephants	8	0	0	0	40
12	Hannes Franklin	SWD Eagles	7	0	0	0	35
12	Japie Nel	Griffons	7	0	0	0	35
12	Hendrik van der Nest	SWD Eagles	7	0	0	0	35
15	Kennedy Tsimba	Pumas	1	9	1	0	26
16	Rassie Jansen van Vuuren	Pumas	5	0	0	0	25
16	Warren Clive Petersen	Leopards	5	0	0	0	25
16	Deon van Rensburg	Leopards	5	0	0	0	25
19	Jacques Coetzee	Pumas	4	0	0	0	20
19	Dougie Hellmuth	Griffons	4	0	0	0	20
19	Michael Killian	Mighty Elephants	4	0	0	0	20
19	Bom Samaai	Leopards	4	0	0	0	20
19	Luvo Sogidashe	Mighty Elephants	4	0	0	0	20
24	Ashwin Scott	SWD Eagles	3	0	0	1	18
25	Marc de Marigny	Pumas	2	2	1	0	17
26	Basil de Doncker	Mighty Elephants	3	0	0	0	15
26	Jaun de Wit	Griffons	3	0	0	0	15
26	Christiaan Els	Pumas	3	0	0	0	15
26	Gideon Jacobus Goosen	Griffons	0	3	3	0	15
26	Rayno Hendricks	Leopards	3	0	0	0	15
26	RW Kember	Mighty Elephants	3	0	0	0	15
26	Allister Kettledas	SWD Eagles	3	0	0	0	15
26	Fabian Juries	Mighty Elephants	3	0	0	0	15
26	Pieter Frederick Nel	Griffons	3	0	0	0	15
26	Maurice Oliver Reid	Pumas	3	0	0	0	15
26	Izak Saayman	SWD Eagles	3	0	0	0	15
26	Fabian Smith	Mighty Elephants	3	0	0	0	15
26	Spencer Pearson Wakeling	SWD Eagles	3	0	0	0	15
26	Vuyo Zangqa	Border Bulldogs	3	0	0	0	15
40	Rudi Vogt	Pumas	0	7	0	0	14
41	Stuart Hudson	Border Bulldogs	2	1	0	0	12
42	Clayton Durand	Leopards	0	4	1	0	11
43	Jaco Bouwer	Leopards	2	0	0	0	10
43	Ashton Constant	Pumas	2	0	0	0	10
43	Leon de Villiers	SWD Eagles	2	0	0	0	10
43	Noel Richard de Villiers	Mighty Elephants	2	0	0	0	10
43	William Fick	Mighty Elephants	2	0	0	0	10
43	Ross Geldenhuys	Pumas	2	0	0	0	10
43	Russel Jeacocks	Border Bulldogs	2	0	0	0	10
43	Morné Kruger	Pumas	2	0	0	0	10
43	Ruan Lamprecht	Pumas	2	0	0	0	10
43	Elroy Ligman	Mighty Elephants	2	0	0	0	10
43	Colin Lloyd	Leopards	2	0	0	0	10
43	Jacques Lombaard	Pumas	2	0	0	0	10
43	Pieter Loots	Border Bulldogs	2	0	0	0	10
43	Sarel Louw	Griffons	2	0	0	0	10
43	Sasha Marot	Pumas	2	0	0	0	10
43	Stevie Meyer	Griffons	2	0	0	0	10
43	Kaunda Ntunja	Border Bulldogs	2	0	0	0	10
43	Gordon Xavier Pangetti	Pumas	2	0	0	0	10
43	Philippus Jacobus Steyn	Griffons	2	0	0	0	10
43	Eddie Johannes Swart	Border Bulldogs	2	0	0	0	10
43	Hyron Thyse	Pumas	2	0	0	0	10
43	Hannes Tredoux	Griffons	2	0	0	0	10
43	Nicky van der Walt	SWD Eagles	2	0	0	0	10
43	Michael van Huyssteen	Mighty Elephants	2	0	0	0	10
43	Elric van Vuuren	Border Bulldogs	0	2	2	0	10
43	Sinethemba Zweni	Border Bulldogs	2	0	0	0	10
69	Liaan Scriven	Mighty Elephants	1	0	0	1	8
70	Jannie Viljoen	SWD Eagles	0	0	2	0	6
71	Morné Basson	Leopards	1	0	0	0	5
71	Deon Booysen	Mighty Elephants	1	0	0	0	5
71	Willie Bower	Mighty Elephants	1	0	0	0	5
71	Gys Briedenhann	Griffons	1	0	0	0	5
71	Barend Johannes Marthinus Britz	Griffons	1	0	0	0	5
71	Ashley Buys	SWD Eagles	1	0	0	0	5
71	Barend du Plessis	Pumas	1	0	0	0	5
71	Jaco du Toit	Griffons	1	0	0	0	5
71	Peter William Featherstone	Border Bulldogs	1	0	0	0	5
71	Joshua John Fowles	Border Bulldogs	1	0	0	0	5
71	Stephan Gerber	Pumas	1	0	0	0	5
71	Henry Grimes	SWD Eagles	1	0	0	0	5
71	Sean Johnson	Pumas	1	0	0	0	5
71	Andries Kruger	Griffons	1	0	0	0	5
71	Riaan Juan Kruger	Pumas	1	0	0	0	5
71	Andries Mahoney	Leopards	1	0	0	0	5
71	Warren Malgas	SWD Eagles	1	0	0	0	5
71	Danzel Manuel	Pumas	1	0	0	0	5
71	Shawn Michael Minnie	SWD Eagles	1	0	0	0	5
71	Lonwabo Mtimka	Border Bulldogs	1	0	0	0	5
71	Jonathan Richard Muller	SWD Eagles	1	0	0	0	5
71	Lungelo Payi	Border Bulldogs	1	0	0	0	5
71	Ricardo Pietersen	SWD Eagles	1	0	0	0	5
71	Brendan Lee Spring	Border Bulldogs	1	0	0	0	5
71	Davon Raubenheimer	SWD Eagles	1	0	0	0	5
71	Corné Steenkamp	Pumas	1	0	0	0	5
71	Stanley Victor Stevens	Griffons	1	0	0	0	5
71	Jarrod Edward Taylor	Border Bulldogs	1	0	0	0	5
71	Leonard van der Merwe	Griffons	1	0	0	0	5
71	Os van der Walt	Mighty Elephants	1	0	0	0	5
71	BW van Dyk	Leopards	1	0	0	0	5
71	Christo van Niekerk	Griffons	1	0	0	0	5
71	Lionelle van Staden	Leopards	1	0	0	0	5
71	Quintin Jean van Tonder	Pumas	1	0	0	0	5
71	Bennie van Vuuren	SWD Eagles	1	0	0	0	5
71	Theo van Wyk	Leopards	1	0	0	0	5
107	Marcel du Toit	Griffons	0	1	0	0	2
–	penalty try	SWD Eagles	1	0	0	0	5
* Legend: T = Tries, C = Conversions, P = Penalties, DG = Drop Goals, Pts = Points.

== See also ==
- 2007 Currie Cup Premier Division
- 2007 Vodacom Cup
