= 2008 Currie Cup Premier Division =

Domestic rugby union competition

- Champions: Sharks
- Matches played: 63
- Tries scored: 388 (average 6.2 per match)
- Top point scorer: Morné Steyn (Blue Bulls; 192)
- Top try scorer: Keegan Daniel (Sharks; 9)

The 2008 Currie Cup Premier Division season (known as the ABSA Currie Cup due to sponsorship) was contested from 20 June through to 25 October. The Currie Cup is an annual domestic competition for provincial rugby union teams in South Africa.

The 2007 Champions, the Free State Cheetahs, were denied a place in the final when they were defeated by the Blue Bulls in their semifinal clash in Pretoria on 11 October.

The Sharks ended a 12-year wait for a trophy by winning 14–9 in the final against the Blue Bulls in Durban on 25 October.

== Current standings ==
2008 Currie Cup Premier Division
Team	Pld	W	D	L	PF	PA	PD	TF	TA	B	Pts	Qualification
Sharks	14	12	0	2	450	243	+207	57	29	9	57	Semi-finals
Blue Bulls	14	11	0	3	482	235	+247	61	27	9	53	Semi-finals
Free State Cheetahs	14	9	0	5	389	265	+124	49	26	6	42	Semi-finals
Lions	14	8	0	6	430	301	+129	55	36	9	41	Semi-finals
Western Province	14	8	0	6	385	276	+109	45	30	8	40	
Griquas	14	3	1	10	315	464	−149	40	60	5	19	
Boland Cavaliers	14	2	1	11	253	528	−275	33	73	4	14	
Falcons	14	2	0	12	293	685	−392	38	97	6	14	

Updated to match(es) played on 6 October 2008. Source:
Rules for classification: Four points for a win; Two points for a draw; One bonus point for a loss by seven points or less; One bonus point for scoring four or more tries in a match

== Teams ==
- Boland Cavaliers
- Sharks
- Blue Bulls
- Free State Cheetahs
- Western Province
- Griquas
- Falcons
- Lions

== Currie Cup compulsory friendlies ==
6 June 2008

SWD Eagles	15–29	Blue Bulls

Outeniqua Park, George

== Round 1 ==
15:30 2008-06-20

Griquas	16–20	Free State Cheetahs
Tries: Stephan Gerber, Con: Conrad Barnard; Pen: Conrad Barnard (3)		Tries: JW Jonker, Schalk Van der Merwe; Con: Jacques-Louis Potgieter (2); Pen: Chris Rossouw (2)

ABSA Park, Kimberley
Referee: JC Fortuin (South Africa)

19:00 2008-06-20

Falcons	42–48	Boland Cavaliers
Tries: Luvo Sogidashe (2), Rouan Cloete, Gerrie Odendaal, Sean Plaatjies, Con: Riaan Smit (4); Pen: Riaan Smit (3)		Tries: John Daniels (3), Justin Peach, Marnus Hugo, Conrad Burke (cpt); Con: Justin Peach (6); Pen: Justin Peach (2)

Bosman Stadium, Brakpan
Referee: Jaco Peyper (South Africa)

19:10 2008-06-20

Sharks	28–25	Western Province
Tries: Rory Kockott, Keegan Daniel; Con: Pen: Rory Kockott (6)		Tries: Wylie Human; Con: Willem de Waal; Pen: Willem de Waal (6)

ABSA Stadium, Durban
Referee: Christie de Preez (South Africa)

15:00 2008-06-21

Lions	7–21	Blue Bulls
Tries: Jano Vermaak; Con: Earl Rose; Pen: Card: Gerhard Mostert (yellow card) 40' to 50'	Report	Tries: John Mametsa (3); Con: Pen: Morné Steyn; DG: JP Joubert

Coca-Cola Park, Johannesburg
Referee: Craig Joubert (South Africa)

=== Round 1 summary ===
- The Free State Cheetahs started the defence of their title with a narrow 20–16 win over neighbours Griquas in Kimberley.
- Boland Cavaliers captain Conrad Burke scored a last minute intercept try to secure a 48–42 victory over the Falcons in their opening match at Bosman Stadium in Brakpan.
- Scrumhalf Rory Kockott landed a 79th-minute penalty from 40 meters out to secure a nail-biting 28–25 victory for Sharks over Western Province in Durban.
- John Mametsa celebrated his 100th game for the Blue Bulls by scoring a hat-trick to set up a 21–7 win for his team against the Lions in their opening encounter at Coca-Cola Park in Johannesburg.

== Round 2 ==
19:00 2008-06-27

Sharks	38–13	Boland Cavaliers
Tries: Jacques Botes (2) Riaan Swanepoel, Henno Mentz, Con: Monty Dumond (3); Pen: Rory Kockott (2), Monty Dumond (2)		Tries: Lionel Cornelius; Con: Justin Peach; Pen: Justin Peach, Lionel Cornelius; Card: Piet van Zyl (yellow card) 58' to 68', Angelo Brinkhuys (yellow card) 66' to 76',

ABSA Stadium, Durban
Referee: JC Fortuin (South Africa)

15:00 2008-06-28

Falcons	36–30	Griquas
Tries: Riaan Smit, Ernie Kruger, Len Olivier; Con: Jacques Schutte (3); Pen: Jacques Schutte (5)		Tries: Herkie Kruger (cpt), Steph Roberts, Stephan Gerber; Con: Conrad Barnard (3); Pen: Conrad Barnard (3)

Bosman Stadium, Brakpan
Referee: Pro Legoete (South Africa)

15:00 2008-06-28

Free State Cheetahs	22–18	Lions
Tries: Chris Roussouw; Con: Chris Roussouw; Pen: Chris Roussouw (5)		Tries: Con: Pen: Earl Rose (6)

Park, Bloemfontein
Referee: Christie de Preez (South Africa)

17:05 2008-06-28

Western Province	26–17	Blue Bulls
Tries: Gio Aplon, Gcobani Bobo; Con: Willem de Waal (2); Pen: Willem de Waal (4)	report	Tries: JP Joubert, Pedrie Wannenburg; Con: Morné Steyn (2); Pen: DG: Morné Steyn; Card: Hilton Lobberts (yellow card) 68' to 78'

Newlands Stadium, Cape Town
Referee: Phillip Bosch (South Africa)

=== Round 2 summary ===
- Sharks scored their second win in as many matches, beating the Boland Cavaliers 38–13 in their match in Durban and go to the top of the standings.
- The Falcons secured their first Currie Cup victory in over a year by beating the Griquas 36–30 in Brakpan.
- With a much-improved performance from the Lions in their clash against the Free State Cheetahs. It was the home side that held their head to seal a close victory.
- Western Province produced a stirring fightback at the death of their clash against the Blue Bulls to record a 26–17 win over their traditional rivals at Newlands Stadium.

== Round 3 ==
15:30 2008-07-04

Boland Cavaliers	9–9	Griquas
Tries: Con: Pen: Justin Peach (2), Lionel Cornelius		Tries: Con: Pen: Conrad Barnard (3)

Boland Stadium, Wellington
Referee: Jonathan Kaplan (South Africa)

19:10 2008-07-04

Lions	35–23	Falcons
Tries: Earl Rose (3), Franco van der Merwe; Con: Earl Rose (3); Pen: Earl Rose (3)		Tries: Dawid Pretorius, Emile Verster, Rouan Cloete; Con: Len Olivier; Pen: Jacques Schutte, Len Olivier

Coca-Cola Park, Johannesburg
Referee: Jaco Peyper (South Africa)

15:00 2008-07-05

Western Province	9–3	Free State Cheetahs
Tries: Con: Pen: Willem de Waal (3)		Tries: Con: Pen: Chris Rossouw

Newlands Stadium, Cape Town
Referee: Craig Joubert (South Africa)

17:05 2008-07-05

Blue Bulls	35–14	Sharks
Tries: Francois Hougaard, Tiger Mangweni (2), Wynand Olivier; Con: Morné Steyn (3); Pen: Morné Steyn (3)	Report	Tries: Philippus van den Berg; Con: Pen: Monty Dumond (3)

Loftus Versfeld, Pretoria
Referee: JC Fortuin (South Africa)

=== Round 3 summary ===
- A handful of spectators witnessed a 9–9 draw between Griquas and Boland Cavaliers at a damp and overcast Boland Stadium in Wellington.
- Lions fullback Earl Rose scored 30 points to help his team to a 35–23 win over a determined Falcons outfit in their clash at Coca-Cola Park.
- Western Province beat the Free State Cheetahs 9–3 in a dull match on a dull day at Newlands Stadium.
- The Blue Bulls went top of the standings after a convincing 35–14 win over Sharks at Loftus Versfeld.

== Round 4 ==
19:10 2008-07-11

Sharks	28–10	Falcons
Tries: Keegan Daniel, Jacques Botes (2), Skholiwe Ndlovu; Con: Monty Dumond; Pen: Monty Dumond (2)		Tries: Gerrit Hendrik Odendaal; Con: Len Olivier; Pen: Jacques Schutte

ABSA Stadium, Durban
Referee: Jonathan Kaplan (South Africa)

15:00 2008-07-12

Lions	57–17	Boland Cavaliers
Tries:Jaco Pretorius (2), Altenstadt Hulme, Earl Rose, Doppies la Grange, Hendrik van Schalkwyk, Jano Vermaak, Willem Alberts; Con: Earl Rose (7); Pen: Earl Rose		Tries: Dries van Schalkwyk, Elgar Watts; Con: Elgar Watts, Lionel Cornelius; Pen: Lionel Cornelius

Coca-Cola Park, Johannesburg
Referee: Deon van Blommestein (South Africa)

15:00 2008-07-12

Griquas	21–20	Western Province
Tries: Gavin Passens, James van der Walt; Con: Conrad Barnard; Pen: Riaan Viljoen (3)		Tries: Brok Harris, Francois Louw; Con: Willem de Waal (2); Pen: Willem de Waal (2)

ABSA Park, Kimberley
Referee: Craig Joubert (South Africa)

17:05 2008-07-12

Blue Bulls	31–23	Free State Cheetahs
Tries: Akona Ndungane, Danie Rossouw, Wynand Olivier; Con: Morné Steyn (2); Pen: Morné Steyn (4)	Report	Tries: Hendro Scholtz, Jongi Nokwe; Con: Chris Rossouw (2); Pen: Chris Rossouw (3)

Loftus Versfeld, Pretoria
Referee: Marius Jonker (South Africa)

=== Round 4 summary ===
- Sharks went to the top of the standings with a 28–10 win over the Falcons at ABSA Stadium in Durban, but it required a late surge against very willing opposition for the home side to earn the bonus point.
- Lions achieved their objective against the Boland Cavaliers and collected a full house of five log points from their match at Coca-Cola Park.
- The Griquas secured their first victory in this season's Currie Cup with an upset victory over Western Province in Kimberley.
- The Blue Bulls secured their third win of the season, beating the Free State Cheetahs 31–23 at Loftus Versfeld, but failed to secure a vital bonus point.

== Round 5 ==
19:10 2008-07-18

Falcons	38–32	Western Province
Tries: Dawid Pretorius, Len Olivier, Nicky Kritzinger, Rouan Cloete, Ryno Barnes; Con: Len Olivier (5); Pen: Jeffrey Perkins; Card: Johan Swartz (red card) 49'	Report	Tries: Adriaan Fondse (2), Brok Harris, Wylie Human; Con: Willem de Waal (3); Pen: Willem de Waal (2); Card:Ross Skeate (yellow card) 33' to 43', Francois Louw (yellow card) 65' to 75'

Bosman Stadium, Brakpan
Referee: Marius Jonker (South Africa)

15:00 2008-07-19

Boland Cavaliers	10–26	Blue Bulls
Tries: Renfred Dazel; Con: Justin Peach; Pen: Justin Peach; Card:Henley du Plessis (yellow card) 57' to 67'	Report	Tries: Akona Ndungane, Marius Delport, Morné Steyn, Wynand Olivier; Con: Morné Steyn (3); Pen: Card:Bandise Maku (yellow card) 79' to 80'

Boland Stadium, Wellington
Referee: Pro Legoete (South Africa)

15:00 2008-07-19

Griquas	32–36	Lions
Tries:Bjorn Basson, Egon Seconds, MJ Mentz, Rohan Kitshoff, Sarel Pretorius, Wayne van Heerden; Con: Wietz Botes; Pen:		Tries: Willie Wepener (2), Louis Ludik (2), Doppies la Grange; Con: Earl Rose (4); Pen: Earl Rose (1)

ABSA Park, Kimberley
Referee: Christie de Preez (South Africa)

17:05 2008-07-12

Free State Cheetahs	31–9	Sharks
Tries: Schalk van der Merwe, Fabian Juries, Eddie Fredericks, Bevin Fortuin; Con: Chris Rossouw (4); Pen: Chris Rossouw		Tries: Con: Pen: Frédéric Michalak, Monty Dumond (2)

Park, Bloemfontein
Referee: Mark Lawrence (South Africa)

=== Round 5 summary ===
- The Falcons, reduced to 14 men for the last 30 minutes of the match, handed Western Province their second defeat when they edged the Cape Town side 38–32 in an enthralling encounter in Brakpan.
- It wasn't the prettiest game of rugby, but the Blue Bulls moved to the top of the standings with a 26–10 win over the Boland Cavaliers in Wellington.
- The Lions continued their resurgent form when they hung on for a 36–32 win over a determined Griquas team in an 11-try thriller in Kimberley.
- The Free State Cheetahs bounced back into play-off contention when they smashed the sloppy Sharks team 31–9 in their match in Bloemfontein.

== Round 6 ==
19:10 2008-07-25

Free State Cheetahs	55–14	Falcons
Tries: Heinrich Brüssow, Jongi Nokwe, Kabamba Floors (2), Robert Ebersohn (2), Wilton Pietersen (2); Con: Bevin Fortuin (3), Tewis de Bruyn (3); Pen: Chris Rossouw		Tries: Johan Jackson; Con: Riaan Smit, Len Olivier; Pen:

Park, Bloemfontein
Referee: Gareth Lloyd-Jones (South Africa)

15:00 2008-07-26

Western Province	50–10	Boland Cavaliers
Tries: AJ Venter, Deon Fourie, Dylan des Fountain, Gcobani Bobo, Joe Pietersen, Ross Skeate, Wylie Human; Con: Peter Grant (6); Pen: Peter Grant		Tries: Andries van Schalkwyk; Con: Stefan Basson; Pen: Justin Peach

Newlands Stadium, Cape Town
Referee: Pro Legoete (South Africa)

17:05 2008-07-26

Sharks	16–11	Lions
Tries: Keegan Daniel; Con: Ruan Pienaar; Pen: Ruan Pienaar (3)		Tries: Willem Alberts; Con: Pen: Earl Rose (2)

ABSA Stadium, Durban
Referee: Jonathan Kaplan (South Africa)

Bye
Blue Bulls	Griquas

=== Round 6 summary ===
- The defending champions, the Free State Cheetahs, proved to be too quick and powerful for the Falcons as they raced a 55–14 win in their match in Bloemfontein.
- Western Province have redeemed the wobbly away leg of their campaign, with an emphatic 50–10 drubbing over their Cape counterparts Boland Cavaliers at Newlands.
- The Sharks squeezed home a late 16–11 victory over the Lions in Durban, sealing a hard-fought encounter that saw a plethora of missed opportunities from both sides.
- The Blue Bulls and Griquas match was postponed till 15 August 2008.

== Round 7 ==
19:10 2008-08-01

Falcons	7–50	Blue Bulls
Tries: Riaan Smit; Con: Riaan Smit; Pen: Card:Warren Perkins (yellow card) 49' to 59'	Report	Tries: Wikus van Heerden (3), Werner Kruger, Rocco Jansen, Pedrie Wannenburg; Con: Burton Francis, Morné Steyn (3); Pen: Morné Steyn (4); Card:Francois Hougaard (yellow card) 62' to 72'

Bosman Stadium, Brakpan
Referee: Jaco Peyper (South Africa)

15:00 2008-08-02

Griquas	15–44	Sharks
Tries: Sarel Pretorius, Bjorn Basson; Con: Conrad Barnard; Pen: Conrad Barnard		Tries: Chris Jordaan (2), Jacques Botes (2), Deon Carstens, Riaan Swanepoel, Waylon Murray; Con: Monty Dumond (3); Pen: Stefan Terblanche

ABSA Park, Kimberley
Referee: Deon van Blommestein (South Africa)

15:00 2008-08-02

Boland Cavaliers	10–15	Free State Cheetahs
Tries: Danwel Demas; Con: Justin Peach; Pen: Justin Peach		Tries: Conrad Strauss, Fabian Juries; Con: Chris Rossouw; Pen: Chris Rossouw

Boland Stadium, Wellington
Referee: Christie du Preez (South Africa)

17:05 2008-08-02

Lions	27–13	Western Province
Tries: Franco van der Merwe, Doppies la Grange, Jano Vermaak; Con: Earl Rose (3); Pen: Earl Rose (2); Card:Dewald Senekal (yellow card) 12' to 22'		Tries: Nick Köster; Con: Willem de Waal; Pen: Willem de Waal (2)

Coca-Cola Park, Johannesburg
Referee: Marius Jonker (South Africa)

=== Round 7 summary ===
- The Blue Bulls raced back to the top of the standings with an emphatic 50–7 win over a game, but hopelessly outclassed, Falcons team in Brakpan.
- Sharks brought Griquas down to earth, literally, with a bang, when they scored an emphatic 44–15 win in Kimberley.
- The defending champions Free State Cheetahs managed to stay in the top two in the standings, thanks to a fortuitous 15–10 victory over a spirited Boland Cavaliers outfit in Wellington.
- The Lions edged back into the top four in the standings with a deserved 27–13 win over Western Province in Johannesburg.

== Round 8 ==
16:00 2008-08-08

Boland Cavaliers	31–29	Falcons
Tries: Marnus Hugo, Danwel Demas, (2) Jean Botha, Neil Papier; Con: Isma-eel Dollie, Justin Peach (2); Pen:		Tries: Dawid Pretorius, Rassie Jansen van Vuuren, Jan Kruger (2), Reg Muller; Con: Jeffrey Perkins (2); Pen:

Boland Stadium, Wellington
Referee: Deon van Blommestein (South Africa)

18:00 2008-08-08

Free State Cheetahs	22–3	Griquas
Tries: Fabian Juries, Hendro Scholtz, Phillip van der Merwe; Con: Chris Rossouw, Tewis de Bruyn; Pen: Chris Rossouw; Card:Gavin Passens (yellow card) 24' to 34', Cobus Calldo (yellow card) 60' to 70'		Tries: Con: Pen: Conrad Barnard; Card:Cilliers Coetzer (yellow card) 11' to 21', Wayne van Heerden (yellow card) 60' to 70'

Park, Bloemfontein
Referee: JC Fortuin (South Africa)

19:10 2008-08-08

Western Province	10–32	Sharks
Tries: Nick Köster; Con: Joe Pietersen; Pen: Joe Pietersen		Tries: Frédéric Michalak, Albert van den Berg, Skipper Badenhorst, Stefan Terblanche; Con: Ruan Pienaar (3); Pen: Ruan Pienaar; DG: Frédéric Michalak

Newlands Stadium, Cape Town
Referee: Jonathan Kaplan (South Africa)

19:10 2008-08-08

Blue Bulls	27–30	Lions
Tries: Burton Francis, Pedrie Wannenburg, Zane Kirchner; Con: Morné Steyn (3); Pen: Morné Steyn (2)	Report	Tries: Franco van der Merwe, Willie Wepener (2), Jaco Pretorius; Con: Earl Rose (2); Pen: Earl Rose (2)

Loftus Versfeld, Pretoria
Referee: Craig Joubert (South Africa)

=== Round 8 summary ===
- The Boland Cavaliers scored a nail-biting 31–29 win over Falcons in a match at Boland Stadium in Wellington, after trailing 19–7 at the interval.
- The defending champion Free State Cheetahs showed superior form in finishing off neighbours Griquas and cement their place in the top two in the standings with convincing 22–3 win in Bloemfontein.
- Sharks moved back to the top of the standings with an emphatic 32–10 win over a hapless Western Province outfit in their Round Eight match at Newlands.
- The Lions, after an early season wobble, have hit some impressive mid-season form and moved further up the standings with an impressive 30–27 bonus-point win over the Blue Bulls at Loftus Versfeld in Pretoria.

== Round 6 bye ==
19:10 2008-08-15

Blue Bulls	41–12	Griquas
Tries: Dewald Potgieter, Deon Stegmann, Gurthro Steenkamp, Tiger Mangweni; Con: Morné Steyn (3); Pen: Morné Steyn (5)	Report	Tries: MJ Mentz, Wietz Botes; Con: Riaan Viljoen; Pen:

Loftus Versfeld, Pretoria
Referee: Christie du Preez (South Africa)

=== Round 6 bye summary ===
- The Blue Bulls returned to the top of the standings after they recorded an emphatic 41–12 win over the Griquas in the Round 6 catch-up match at Loftus Versfeld.

== Round 9 ==
19:10 2008-08-22

Lions	28–38	Free State Cheetahs
Tries: Earl Rose, Rayno Benjamin (2); Con: Earl Rose (2); Pen: Earl Rose (2); DG: Earl Rose; Card: Jano Vermaak (yellow card) 30' to 40'		Tries: David de Villiers, Hendro Scholtz, Jacobus Jonker, Neil Powell; Con: Chris Rossouw (2), Tewis de Bruyn; Pen: Chris Rossouw (4)

Coca-Cola Park, Johannesburg
Referee: Marius Jonker (South Africa)

15:00 2008-08-23

Griquas	59–19	Falcons
Tries: Albertus Buckle, Bjorn Basson, Hans van Dyk, MJ Mentz (3), Rohan Kitshoff, Sarel Pretorius; Con: Conrad Barnard (5); Pen: Conrad Barnard (3)		Tries: Jody Jenneker, Hanno Coetzee, Nicky Kritzinger; Con: Petrus van Rooyen; Pen:

ABSA Park, Kimberley
Referee: Jonathan Kaplan (South Africa)

16:00 2008-08-29

Boland Cavaliers	7–41	Sharks
Tries: Alvin Hugo; Con: Justin Peach; Pen:		Tries: Brad Barritt, Chris Jordaan, Keegan Daniel, Jacques Botes, Waylon Murray (2); Con: Frédéric Michalak (3), Rory Kockott; Pen: Frédéric Michalak

Boland Stadium, Wellington
Referee: Jonathan Kaplan (South Africa)

19:10 2008-08-29

Blue Bulls	37–6	Western Province
Tries: Sello Mametsa, Tiger Mangweni, Werner Kruger, Wikus van Heerden; Con: Morné Steyn (4); Pen: Morné Steyn	Report	Tries: Con: Pen: Joe Pietersen (2)

Loftus Versfeld, Pretoria
Referee: Mark Lawrence (South Africa)

=== Round 9 summary ===
- The Free State Cheetahs raced back to the top of the standings with a comfortable 38–28 win over the Lions in their match in Johannesburg.
- A flurry of tries, including a hat-trick from wing MJ Mentz, saw the Griquas put on their performance of the season against the Falcons, to win 59–19 in their clash in Kimberley.
- Sharks ran in six tries to secure a coveted bonus point, in the convincing 41–7 victory over the Boland Cavaliers, despite a saturated pitch at Boland Stadium.
- A late Tiger Mangweni try gave the Blue Bulls a bonus-point 37–6 victory over Western Province in Pretoria, putting the hosts back on top of the standings after the Free State Cheetahs were on top of the standings for a week.

== Round 10 ==
19:10 2008-09-05

Falcons	14–83	Lions
Tries: Dawid Pretorius, Gavin Whittingham; Con: Petrus van Rooyen (2); Pen:		Tries: Anton van Zyl, Ethienne Reynecke (2), Doppies la Grange (2), Hendrik van Schalkwyk (2), Jaco Pretorius, Lukhanyo Nontshinga, Michael Killian (2), Rayno Benjamin (2); Con: Earl Rose (6), Louis Strydom (3); Pen: Card: Jaco van Schalkwyk (red card) 63'

Bosman Stadium, Brakpan
Referee: Marius Jonker (South Africa)

15:00 2008-09-06

Free State Cheetahs	17–35	Western Province
Tries: Fabian Juries, Wilton Pietersen; Con: Herman Bosman (2); Pen: Herman Bosman		Tries: Andries Bekker, Ricky Januarie, Jean de Villiers (cpt), Joe Pietersen; Con: Peter Grant (3); Pen: Peter Grant (3); Card:Schalk Burger (yellow card) 29' (yellow-red card) 70'

Park, Bloemfontein
Referee: Phillip Bosch (South Africa)

17:00 2008-09-06

Griquas	48–22	Boland Cavaliers
Tries: Bjorn Basson (3), Heinrich Stride, MJ Mentz (2), Wietz Tobias Botes; Con: Conrad Barnard (5); Pen: Conrad Barnard		Tries: Renfred Dazel, Willem van Zyl, W. P. Nel; Con: Justin Peach(2); Pen: Justin Peach

ABSA Park, Kimberley
Referee: Deon van Blommestein (South Africa)

17:05 2008-09-06

Sharks	34–25	Blue Bulls
Tries: JP Pietersen, Keegan Daniel, Odwa Ndungane, Stefan Terblanche; Con: Ruan Pienaar (4); Pen: Ruan Pienaar (2)		Tries: Marius Delport, Victor Matfield, Wynand Olivier (2); Con: Morné Steyn; Pen: Morné Steyn

ABSA Stadium, Durban
Referee: Mark Lawrence (South Africa)

=== Round 10 summary ===
- The Lions produced a polished performance to obliterate the struggling Falcons, courtesy of an 83–14 thumping at Bosman Stadium in Brakpan.
- Western Province managed to keep their slim hopes of a semifinal alive after a convincing 35–17 victory over the Free State Cheetahs in Bloemfontein.
- Wing Bjorn Basson made a star turn for his province at the Griquas swept the challenge of the Boland Cavaliers aside with a 48–22 win at ABSA Park in Kimberley.
- Sharks moved into top spot on the standings after disposing of the Blue Bulls courtesy of a 34–25 win at ABSA Stadium in Durban.

== Round 11 ==
19:10 2008-09-12

Blue Bulls	69–19	Boland Cavaliers
Tries: Akona Ndungane, Burton Francis, Gurthro Steenkamp, Wilhelm Steenkamp (2), Marius Delport, Morné Steyn, Sello Mametsa (2), Tiger Mangweni, Wayne Julies; Con: Burton Francis, Morné Steyn (5), Zane Kirchner; Pen:	Report	Tries: Elgar Watts, Johannes van Niekerk, Lionel Cornelius; Con: Lionel Cornelius (2); Pen:

Loftus Versfeld, Pretoria
Referee: Marius Jonker (South Africa)

15:00 2008-09-13

Western Province	92–15	Falcons
Tries: Andries Bekker (5), Jean de Villiers, Bolla Conradie, Luke Watson, Nick Köster, Schalk Brits, Sireli Naqelevuki (2), Tonderai Chavhanga (2); Con: Joe Pietersen (2), Peter Grant (9); Pen:		Tries: Jan Kruger (2); Con: Petrus van Rooyen; Pen: Petrus van Rooyen

Newlands Stadium, Cape Town
Referee: Christie du Preez (South Africa)

17:00 2008-09-13

Lions	41–20	Griquas
Tries: Doppies la Grange, Michael Killian (3), Cobus Grobbelaar, Ross Geldenhuys; Con: Earl Rose (3), Louis Strydom; Pen: Earl Rose		Tries: Hans van Dyk, Jacques Lombaard; Con: Conrad Barnard (2); Pen: Conrad Barnard (2)

Coca-Cola Park, Johannesburg
Referee: JC Fortuin (South Africa)

17:05 2008-09-13

Sharks	22–10	Free State Cheetahs
Tries: Keegan Daniel, Pieter Carstens, Steven Sykes; Con: Ruan Pienaar (2); Pen: François Steyn		Tries: Juan Smith; Con: Tewis de Bruyn; Pen: Tewis de Bruyn

ABSA Stadium, Durban
Referee: Willie Roos (South Africa)

=== Round 11 summary ===
- The Blue Bulls scored 11 tries in an effortless 69–19 trampling over a vulnerable Boland Cavaliers outfit, in their fixture at Loftus Versfeld.
- It was a leisurely Saturday stroll for Western Province, running in 14 tries over a hapless Falcons outfit to a massive 92–15 win, and closing the gap further on the final four in the standings.
- The Lions scored six tries to the Griquas two in a valuable 41–20 victory in Johannesburg, seeing them pip past the Free State Cheetahs into third place in the standings.
- Sharks regained their position on the top of the table after a physical 22–10 victory over the defending champion Free State Cheetahs in Durban.

== Round 12 ==
19:10 2008-09-19

Western Province	30–18	Griquas
Tries: Ricky Januarie, Jean de Villiers, Francois Louw, Tonderai Chavhanga; Con: Peter Grant (2); Pen: Peter Grant (2)		Tries: Gareth Krause, Penalty try Con: Conrad Barnard; Pen: Conrad Barnard (2); Card: Stefan Gerber (yellow card) 45' to 55'

Newlands Stadium, Cape Town
Referee: Jonathan Kaplan (South Africa)

15:00 2008-09-20

Falcons	19–44	Sharks
Tries: Franco Booysen, Johan Jackson, Hanno Coetzee; Con: Jeffrey Perkins (2); Pen: Card: François Steyn (yellow card) 22' to 32'		Tries: Jan du Plessis, JP Pietersen, Pat Cilliers, Albert van den Berg, Ryan Kankowski, Waylon Murray (2); Con: Ruan Pienaar (3); Pen: Ruan Pienaar; Card: Dewald Coetzee (yellow card) 36' to 46', Wouter Moore (yellow card) 45' to 55'

Barnard Stadium, Kempton Park
Referee: Pro Legoete (South Africa)

15:00 2008-09-20

Boland Cavaliers	10–31	Lions
Tries: David Hendricks, Elgar Watts; Con: Pen:		Tries: Derick Minnie, Jaco Pretorius, Lukhanyo Nontshinga, Michael Killian; Con: Earl Rose (4); Pen: Earl Rose

Boland Stadium, Wellington
Referee: Phillip Bosch (South Africa)

17:05 2008-09-20

Free State Cheetahs	5–23	Blue Bulls
Tries: Robert Ebersohn; Con: Pen:	Report	Tries: Bryan Habana, Marius Delport; Con: Morné Steyn(2); Pen: Morné Steyn (3); Card: Danie Rossouw (yellow card) 66' to 76'

Park, Bloemfontein
Referee: Craig Joubert (South Africa)

=== Round 12 summary ===
- Western Province have managed to overtake the Free State Cheetahs into fourth spot, and a semifinal place, in the standings after securing a bonus-point 30–18 win over Griquas at Newlands.
- Sharks consolidated their position at the top of the standings with a solid, if unspectacular 44–19 win over a brave Falcons outfit at Barnard Stadium in Kempton Park.
- The Lions managed to secure a much-needed bonus-point try in the final throes of their match against Boland Cavaliers.
- The Free State Cheetahs have dropped out of the play-off positions after a nervy performance against the Blue Bulls who condemned them to a 23–5 defeat at Park in Bloemfontein.

== Round 13 ==
15:30 2008-09-26

Griquas	22–58	Blue Bulls
Tries: Conrad Barnard, MJ Mentz, Sarel Pretorius; Con: Conrad Barnard (2); Pen: Conrad Barnard	Report	Tries: Akona Ndungane, Bryan Habana, Derick Kuün (3), Fourie Du Preez, Tiger Mangweni, Wynand Olivier; Con: Burton Francis (2), Morné Steyn (4); Pen: Morné Steyn (2)

ABSA Park, Kimberley
Referee: Jonathan Kaplan (South Africa)

19:10 2008-09-26

Falcons	7–78	Free State Cheetahs
Tries: Ryno Barnes; Con: Jeffrey Perkins; Pen: Card: Gert Lubbe (yellow card) 19' to 29', Jeffrey Perkins (yellow card) 56' to 66'		Tries: Penalty try, Duane Vermeulen, Heinrich Brüssow, Jacobus Jonker (2), Louis Potgieter, Jongi Nokwe (3), Kabamba Floors, Tewis de Bruyn (2); Con: Louis Potgieter, Tewis de Bruyn; Pen:

Bosman Stadium, Brakpan
Referee: Deon van Blommestein (South Africa)

15:00 2008-09-27

Boland Cavaliers	7–23	Western Province
Tries: Danwel Demas; Con: Justin Peach; Pen: Card: Deon Scholtz (yellow card) 54' to 64'		Tries: Luke Watson, Sireli Naqelevuki (2); Con: Morgan Newman; Pen: Peter Grant (2)

Boland Stadium, Wellington
Referee: Christie du Preez (South Africa)

17:05 2008-09-27

Lions	20–34	Sharks
Tries: Ernst Joubert, Hendrik van der Merwe, Lukhanyo Nontshinga; Con: Louis Strydom; Pen: Earl Rose		Tries: Jean Deysel, JP Pietersen (2), Deon Carstens; Con: Ruan Pienaar (4); Pen: Ruan Pienaar (2)

Coca-Cola Park, Johannesburg
Referee: Mark Lawrence (South Africa)

=== Round 13 summary ===
- The Blue Bulls have pipped Sharks once again and are back on top of the standings, thanks to a 58–22 haul over the Griquas in Kimberley.
- The Free State Cheetahs are back in the semifinal hunt, having leapfrogged the Western Province into fourth place after a bludgeoning 78–7 victory over the Falcons in Barkpan.
- Western Province failed to secure a vital bonus point in their 23–7 victory over the Boland Cavaliers in Wellington, leaving their semifinal hopes in dire straits.
- The Western Province vs Boland Cavaliers match was moved to Newlands on Friday 26 September due to the heavy rain during the week in the Western Cape that caused flooding at the Boland Stadium, but the Free State Cheetahs complained that they had to play the Boland Cavaliers on 2 August in Wellington. Due to this referee Christie du Preez had to make a decision if it was fit to play at the Boland Stadium, Inspection to field took place on Saturday morning and it was rendered that the Boland Stadium was fine for the crucial match.
- Sharks have officially secured a home semifinal thanks to an emphatic 34–20 bonus point victory over the Lions, in their clash in Johannesburg.

== Round 14 ==
19:10 2008-10-03

Blue Bulls	22–20	Falcons
Tries: Jaco Engels, Stephan Dippenaar, Zane Kirchner; Con: Burton Francis (2); Pen: Burton Francis		Tries: Franco Booysen, Poerie van Rooyen; Con: Jeffrey Perkins (2); Pen: Jeffrey Perkins (2); Card: Wouter Moore (yellow card) 30' to 40'

Loftus Versfeld, Pretoria
Referee: JC Fortuin (South Africa)

15:00 2008-10-04

Free State Cheetahs	50–40	Boland Cavaliers
Tries: Heinrich Brüssow, Jongi Nokwe, Juan Smith (2), Nico Breedt, Schalk van der Merwe, Tewis de Bruyn; Con: Jacques-Louis Potgieter (5), Tewis de Bruyn; Pen: Jacques-Louis Potgieter		Tries: Deon Scholtz, Elgar Watts, Josh Strauss, Willem van Zyl; Con: Elgar Watts, Justin Peach (4); Pen: Card: David Hendricks (yellow card) 35' to 45', Angelo Brinkhuys (yellow card) 40' to 50'

Park, Bloemfontein
Referee: Marius Jonker (South Africa)

15:00 2008-10-04

Sharks	66–12	Griquas
Tries: Albert van den Berg, François Steyn, Jacques Botes, John Smit, JP Pietersen (2), Keegan Daniel (3), Odwa Ndungane; Con: Adrian Jacobs, Brad Barritt, Odwa Ndungane, Ruan Pienaar (5); Pen: Card: Brad Barritt (yellow card) 67' to 77'		Tries: Naas Olivier, Sarel Pretorius; Con: Riaan Viljoen; Pen:

ABSA Stadium, Durban
Referee: Jonathan Kaplan (South Africa)

17:05 2008-10-04

Western Province	14–6	Lions
Tries: Jean de Villiers, Luke Watson; Con: Joe Pietersen, Peter Grant; Pen:		Tries: Con: Pen: Earl Rose (2); Card: Doppies la Grange (yellow card) 39' to 49'

Newlands Stadium, Cape Town
Referee: Craig Joubert (South Africa)

=== Round 14 summary ===
- The Blue Bulls were very nearly left red-faced in front of the Loftus Versfeld faithful as they scraped a 22–20 win over the Falcons
- The Free State Cheetahs did enough to secure their passage to the semifinals courtesy of a 50–40 victory over the Boland Cavaliers in Bloemfontein.
- Sharks confirmed their status and favourites for this year's when they continued their good form with a 66–12 win over the Griquas in Durban.
- Western Province 14-6 Lions

== Knockout stage ==
Semi-finals
11 October 2008 – ABSA Stadium, Durban
Sharks	29
Lions	14
11 October 2008 – Loftus Versfeld, Pretoria
Blue Bulls	31
Free State Cheetahs	19

Final
25 October 2008 – ABSA Stadium, Durban
Sharks	14
Blue Bulls	9

== Semi finals ==
11 October 2008
14:30

Sharks	29–14	Lions
Tries: Frédéric Michalak, Ryan Kankowski; Con: Ruan Pienaar (2); Pen: François Steyn, Ruan Pienaar (4)		Tries: Doppies la Grange, Jaque Fourie; Con: Chris Jonck, Earl Rose; Pen:

ABSA Stadium, Durban
Referee: Mark Lawrence (South Africa)

11 October 2008
17:00

Blue Bulls	31–19	Free State Cheetahs
Tries: Bryan Habana, John Mametsa, Victor Matfield; Con: Morné Steyn (2); Pen: Morné Steyn (3); DG: Morné Steyn		Tries: Jongi Nokwe; Con: Jacques-Louis Potgieter; Pen: Jacques-Louis Potgieter (4)

Loftus Versfeld, Pretoria
Referee: Craig Joubert (South Africa)

== Final ==
The Sharks ended a 12-year wait for a trophy by winning the final, against the Blue Bulls in Durban on Saturday 25 October, by 14–9. And they did it in style outscoring the Blue Bulls by two tries to nil.

25 October 2008
16:30

Sharks	14–9	Blue Bulls
Tries: François Steyn, Ruan Pienaar; Con: Frédéric Michalak, Ruan Pienaar; Pen:		Tries: Con: Pen: Morné Steyn (2); DG: Morné Steyn

ABSA Stadium, Durban
Referee: Jonathan Kaplan (South Africa)

== Promotion/relegation matches ==
=== Round 1 ===
16:30 2008-10-18

Boland Cavaliers	54–15	Griffons
Tries: Danwel Demas, Deon Scholtz, Elgar Watts (4), Lionel Cornelius, Piet van Zyl; Con: Elgar Watts, Justin Peach (6); Pen:		Tries: Jacko Jackson, Sarel Louw; Con: Jandré Blom; Pen: Jandré Blom

Boland Stadium, Wellington
Referee: Jonathan Kaplan (South Africa)

19:00 2008-10-18

Falcons	24–29	Platinum Leopards
Tries: Dewald Coetzee, Hanno Coetzee, Petrus van Rooyen; Con: Jeffrey Perkins, Petrus van Rooyen (2); Pen: Jeffrey Perkins		Tries: Jan Van Zyl, Willem Bouwer; Con: Clayton Durand (2); Pen: Clayton Durand (5)

Bosman Stadium, Brakpan
Referee: Willie Roos (South Africa)

=== Round 2 ===
16:00 2008-10-24

Boland Cavaliers	42–50	Griffons
Tries: Angelo Brinkhuys, Bradley Mockford, Deon Scholtz (2), Dewey Swartbooi, Zolani Mofu; Con: Justin Peach (5), Lionel Cornelius; Pen:		Tries: Andries Kruger, Darryl Coeries, Hugo Kleynhans, Jacko Jackson, Jandré Blom, Jaun de Wit, Ockie van Zyl; Con: Jandré Blom (2), Kennedy Tsimba (4); Pen: DG: Jandré Blom

North West Stadium, Welkom
Referee: Craig Joubert (South Africa)

18:00 2008-10-24

Falcons	19–27	Platinum Leopards
Tries: Petrus van Rooyen; Con: Petrus van Rooyen; Pen: Petrus van Rooyen		Tries: Jan Van Zyl, Vuyo Zangqa; Con: Diederik Botha; Pen: Clayton Durand (3), Diederik Botha (2)

Profert Olën Park, Potchefstroom
Referee: Marius Jonker (South Africa)

=== Promotion/relegation table ===
Promotion/relegation
Team	Pld	W	D	L	PF	PA	PD	TF	TA	B	Pts
Platinum Leopards	2	2	0	0	56	43	+13	4	4	0	8
Boland Cavaliers	2	1	0	1	96	65	+31	14	9	2	6
Griffons	2	1	0	1	65	96	−31	9	14	1	5
Falcons	2	0	0	2	43	56	−13	4	4	1	1

=== Results ===
- Boland Cavaliers manage to stay in the Premier Division.
- Platinum Leopards are promoted to the Premier Division.
- The Griffons just lost out to the Boland Cavaliers to remain in the First Division.
- The Falcons are relegated to the First Division after losing both their matches against the Platinum Leopards.

== Statistics ==
=== Top point scorers ===
Name	Team	Tries	Conversions	Penalties	Drop goals	Total
Morné Steyn	Blue Bulls	2	37	33	3	192
Earl Rose	Lions	5	36	24	1	172
Conrad Barnard	Griquas	1	20	19	0	102
Ruan Pienaar	Sharks	1	25	13	0	87
Chris Rossouw	Free State Cheetahs	1	11	19	0	84

=== Top try scorers ===
Name	Team	Tries
Keegan Daniel	Sharks	9
MJ Mentz	Griquas	8
Jacques Botes	Sharks	8
John Mametsa	Blue Bulls	7
Jongi Nokwe	Free State Cheetahs	7

=== Disciplinary records by team ===
Team	Red cards (red card)	Yellow cards (yellow card)	Total cards
Falcons	1	10	11
Boland Cavaliers	0	9	9
Blue Bulls	0	7	7
Griquas	0	5	5
Western Province	0	5	5
Lions	1	4	5
Sharks	0	4	4
Free State Cheetahs	0	2	2

=== Worst disciplinary records by player ===
Name	Team	Red Cards (red card)	Yellow Cards (yellow card)	Total Cards
Johannes Swartz	Falcons	1	0	1
Jaco van Schalkwyk	Lions	1	0	1
Sean Plaatjies	Falcons	0	2	2
Angelo Brinkhuys	Boland Cavaliers	0	2	2
Stefan Basson	Boland Cavaliers	0	1	1
