= 2008 Currie Cup First Division =

Domestic rugby union competition

- Official logo
- Champions: Griffons
- Matches played: 33
- Tries scored: 228 (average 6.9 per match)
- Top point scorer: Clayton Durand, Leopards (176)
- Top try scorer: Deon van Rensburg, Leopards (11)

The 2008 Absa Currie Cup First Division season was contested from 27 June through to 10 October. The Currie Cup is an annual domestic competition for provincial rugby union teams in South Africa.

== History ==
- The Absa Currie Cup First Division, as it is today known, is the ninth season of the competition.
- The competition was first contested in 2000 when it was known as the Bankfin Cup and played alongside the Bankfin Currie Cup. It later became known as the Absa Cup and, from 2004, the Absa Currie Cup First Division.
- The first winners of the competition were the Vodacom Blue Bulls who, just two seasons later, would go on to win the Absa Currie Cup title three years in succession.
- Boland Kavaliers have won the title three times.
- Boland Kavaliers and the Platinum Leopards have met in the final three times – 2001, 2003 and 2006 – with the Platinum Leopards winning all three matches.

=== No of First Division titles ===
Pos.	Team	Champion	Runner-up
1st	Boland Kavaliers	4 (2001, 2003, 2004, 2006)	
2nd	SWD Eagles	2 (2002, 2007)	
3rd	Vodacom Blue Bulls	1 (2000)	
3rd	Pumas	1 (2005)	
3rd	Griffons	1 (2008)	
4th	Platinum Leopards	-	4 (2001, 2003, 2006, 2008)
5th	Mighty Elephants	-	2 (2000, 2007)
5th	Border Bulldogs	-	2 (2002, 2004)
6th	Valke	-	1 (2005)

== Overview ==
The winner of the final plays against the team that are at the bottom of the Absa Currie Cup Premier Division standings and the runner-up plays the 2nd last team on the log for a chance to be promoted to the Premier Division. The SWD Eagles won the final of the 2007 Currie Cup First Division 38 – 3 against the Mighty Elephants, and faced the Valke in the playoff matches. The Mighty Elephants faced the Boland Kavaliers in their two leg matches.

== Teams ==
The SWD Eagles and the Mighty Elephants did not get promoted to the Premier Division. They both lost both their matches against the Valke and the Boland Kavaliers.

The teams are listed in alphabetical order:

- Mighty Elephants from Port Elizabeth
- Border Bulldogs from East London
- Griffons from Welkom
- Platinum Leopards from Potchefstroom
- Pumas from Witbank
- SWD Eagles from George

== Final standings ==
2008 Absa Currie Cup First Div
Team	P	W	D	L	PF	PA	PD	TF	TA	BP	Pts
Platinum Leopards	10	8	0	2	438	262	176	57	29	9	41
Griffons	10	7	0	3	303	214	89	30	23	4	32
SWD Eagles	10	5	0	5	307	262	45	41	28	9	29
Pumas	10	4	0	6	268	362	-94	33	48	8	24
Border Bulldogs	10	4	0	6	232	366	-134	26	47	3	19
Mighty Elephants	10	2	0	8	238	320	-82	27	39	5	13

Updated 29 September 2008:

=== Points Breakdown ===
- Four points for a win
- Two points for a draw
- One bonus point for a loss by seven points or less
- One bonus point for scoring four or more tries in a match

=== Table Notes ===
- P = points
- W = Won
- D = Drawn
- L = Lost
- PF = points for
- P = Points Against
- PD = Points Difference (PF - PA)
- TF = Tries For
- TA = Tries Against
- BP = Bonus points
- Pts = Total Points

== Fixtures and results ==
=== Compulsory Friendlies ===
15:00 2008-05-31

East Cape XV	17 – 63	Vodacom Western Province

ABSA Stadium, East London
Referee: Christie du Preez (South Africa)

18:00 2008-06-06

SWD Eagles	15 – 29	Vodacom Blue Bulls

Outeniqua Park, George
Referee: Joey Salmans (South Africa)

19:00 2008-06-13

Griffons	15 – 44	Sharks

North West Stadium, Welkom
Referee: Mark Lawrence (South Africa)

19:00 2008-06-13

Platinum Leopards	19 – 40	Vodacom FS Cheetahs

Santam Olën Park, Potchefstroom
Referee: Jonathan Kaplan (South Africa)

19:00 2008-06-13

East Cape XV	9 – 26	Xerox Lions

EPRFU Stadium, Port Elizabeth
Referee: Jaco Peyper (South Africa)

19:00 2008-08-29

Pumas	22 – 28	Griquas

Ermelo HS, Ermelo
Referee: James Bolabiu (South Africa)

==== Week One ====
19:00 2008-06-27

Pumas	32 – 30	Mighty Elephants
Tries: Thyse 30' c Terblanche 50' m Marx 55' c Sithole 74' c Con: Coetzee (1/2); Marx (2/2); Pen: Coetzee 17' (1/4); Marx 60' (1/1); Cards: Thyse (yellow card) 38' to 50'		Tries: Nel 25' c Jacobs 65' c Booysen 80'+4' m Nelson 80'+8' m Con: Gallinetti (2/4); Pen: Gallinetti 39', 40'+3' (2/3)

Puma Stadium, Witbank
Referee: Deon van Blommestein (South Africa)

16:00 2008-06-28

Griffons	34 – 31	SWD Eagles
Tries: Con: Pen:		Tries: Con: Pen:

North West Stadium, Welkom
Referee: Jaco Peyper (South Africa)

Bye
Platinum Leopards	Border Bulldogs

==== Week Two ====
19:00 2008-07-04

Border Bulldogs	14 – 30	Griffons
Tries: Con: Pen:		Tries: Con: Pen:

Absa Stadium, East London
Referee: Pro Legoete (South Africa)

15:30 2008-07-05

Mighty Elephants	23 – 47	Platinum Leopards
Tries: Con: Pen:		Tries: Con: Pen:

EPRFU Stadium, Port Elizabeth
Referee: Deon van Blommestein (South Africa)

Bye
Pumas	SWD Eagles

==== Week Three ====
19:00 2008-07-11

Pumas	23 – 27	Border Bulldogs
Tries: Con: Pen:		Tries: Con: Pen:

Puma Stadium, Witbank
Referee: JC Fortuin (South Africa)

16:00 2008-07-12

Platinum Leopards	41 – 33	SWD Eagles
Tries: Con: Pen:		Tries: Con: Pen:

Profert Olën Park, Potchefstroom
Referee: Christie du Preez (South Africa)

Bye
Griffons	Mighty Elephants

==== Week Four ====
19:00 2008-07-18

Border Bulldogs	19 – 29	Platinum Leopards
Tries: Con: Pen:		Tries: Con: Pen:

Absa Stadium, East London
Referee: Phillip Bosch (South Africa)

15:00 2008-07-19

SWD Eagles	29 – 6	Mighty Elephants
Tries: Con: Pen:		Tries: Con: Pen:

Outeniqua Park, George
Referee: Francois Veldsman (South Africa)

16:30 2008-07-19

Griffons	24 – 30	Pumas
Tries: Con: Pen:		Tries: Con: Pen:

North West Stadium, Welkom
Referee: Jaco Peyper (South Africa)

==== Week Five ====
15:00 2008-07-26

SWD Eagles	48 – 7	Border Bulldogs
Tries: Con: Pen:		Tries: Con: Pen:

Outeniqua Park, George
Referee: Christie du Preez (South Africa)

15:30 2008-07-26

Mighty Elephants	27 – 19	Griffons
Tries: Con: Pen:		Tries: Con: Pen:

EPRFU Stadium, Port Elizabeth
Referee: Deon van Blommestein (South Africa)

16:00 2008-07-26

Platinum Leopards	54 – 14	Pumas
Tries: Con: Pen:		Tries: Con: Pen:

Profert Olën Park, Potchefstroom
Referee: Phillip Bosch (South Africa)

==== Week Six ====
19:00 2008-08-01

Border Bulldogs	28 – 16	Mighty Elephants
Tries: Con: Pen:		Tries: Con: Pen:

Absa Stadium, East London
Referee: JC Fortuin (South Africa)

15:00 2008-08-02

SWD Eagles	31 – 20	Pumas
Tries: Con: Pen:		Tries: Con: Pen:

Outeniqua Park, George
Referee: Wayne Barnes (South Africa)

16:00 2008-08-02

Griffons	23 – 29	Platinum Leopards
Tries: Con: Pen:		Tries: Con: Pen:

North West Stadium, Welkom
Referee: Joey Salmans (South Africa)

==== Week Seven ====
19:00 2008-08-08

Pumas	12 – 28	Griffons
Tries: Con: Pen:		Tries: Con: Pen:

Puma Stadium, Witbank
Referee: Christie du Preez (South Africa)

16:00 2008-08-09

Platinum Leopards	53 – 23	Border Bulldogs
Tries: Con: Pen:		Tries: Con: Pen:

Profert Olën Park, Potchefstroom
Referee: Pro Legoete (South Africa)

16:00 2008-08-09

Mighty Elephants	21 – 26	SWD Eagles
Tries: Con: Pen:		Tries: Con: Pen:

EPRFU Stadium, Port Elizabeth
Referee: Gareth Lloyd-Jones (South Africa)

==== Week Eight ====
19:00 2008-08-22

Platinum Leopards	51 – 27	Mighty Elephants
Tries: Con: Pen:		Tries: Con: Pen:

Profert Olën Park, Potchefstroom
Referee: Deon van Blommestein (South Africa)

16:30 2008-07-30

Griffons	50 – 9	Border Bulldogs
Tries: Con: Pen:		Tries: Con: Pen:

North West Stadium, Welkom
Referee: JC Fortuin (South Africa)

Bye
SWD Eagles	Pumas

==== Week Nine ====
19:00 2008-09-05

Border Bulldogs	45 – 40	Pumas
Tries: Con: Pen:		Tries: Con: Pen:

Absa Stadium, East London
Referee: Jonathan Kaplan (South Africa)

15:00 2008-09-06

SWD Eagles	35 – 34	Platinum Leopards
Tries: Con: Pen:		Tries: Con: Pen:

Outeniqua Park, George
Referee: Willie Roos (South Africa)

Bye
Griffons	Mighty Elephants

==== Week Ten ====
19:00 2008-09-12

Pumas	36 – 22	SWD Eagles
Tries: Con: Pen:		Tries: Con: Pen:

Witbank Mica Stadium, Witbank
Referee: Pro Legoete (South Africa)

16:00 2008-09-13

Platinum Leopards	23 – 36	Griffons
Tries: Con: Pen:		Tries: Con: Pen:

Profert Olën Park, Potchefstroom
Referee: Jaco Peyper (South Africa)

16:15 2008-09-13

Mighty Elephants	44 – 23	Border Bulldogs
Tries: Con: Pen:		Tries: Con: Pen:

EPRFU Stadium, Port Elizabeth
Referee: Joey Salmans (South Africa)

==== Week Eleven ====
19:00 2008-09-19

Pumas	29 – 77	Platinum Leopards
Tries: Con: Pen:		Tries: Con: Pen:

Puma Stadium, Witbank
Referee: Willie Roos (South Africa)

19:00 2008-09-19

Border Bulldogs	37 – 33	SWD Eagles
Tries: Con: Pen:		Tries: Con: Pen:

Absa Stadium, East London
Referee: Francois Veldsman (South Africa)

16:00 2008-09-20

Griffons	33 – 20	Mighty Elephants
Tries: Con: Pen:		Tries: Con: Pen:

North West Stadium, Welkom
Referee: JC Fortuin (South Africa)

==== Week Twelve ====
19:00 2008-09-27

SWD Eagles	19 – 26	Griffons
Tries: Con: Pen:		Tries: Con: Pen:

Outeniqua Park, George
Referee: Joey Salmans (South Africa)

17:00 2008-09-27

Mighty Elephants	24 – 32	Pumas
Tries: Con: Pen:		Tries: Con: Pen:

Adcock Stadium, Port Elizabeth
Referee: Gareth Lloyd-Jones (South Africa)

Bye
Platinum Leopards	Border Bulldogs

=== Knock Out Stage ===
Semi-finals
2008-10-03 - Profert Olën Park, Potchefstroom
Platinum Leopards	50
Pumas	18
2008-10-04 - North West Stadium, Welkom
Griffons	27
SWD Eagles	17

Final
2008-10-10 - Profert Olën Park, Potchefstroom
Platinum Leopards	26
Griffons	31

=== Semi finals ===
17:05 2008-10-03

Platinum Leopards	50 – 18	Pumas
Tries: Con: Pen:		Tries: Con: Pen:

Profert Olën Park, Potchefstroom

15:00 2008-10-04

Griffons	27 – 17	SWD Eagles
Tries: Con: Pen:		Tries: Con: Pen:

North West Stadium, Welkom

=== Finals ===
19:10 2008-10-10

Platinum Leopards	26 – 31	Griffons
Tries: Con: Pen:		Tries: Con: Pen:

Profert Olën Park, Potchefstroom

2008 Absa Currie Cup
First Division
Champions
Griffons
1st title

== Promotion/relegation ==
=== Round 1 ===
16:30 2008-10-18

Boland Kavaliers	54 – 15	Griffons
Tries: Danwel Demas, Deon Scholtz, Elgar Watts (4), Lionel Cornelius, Piet van Zyl; Con: Elgar Watts, Justin Peach (6); Pen:		Tries: Jacko Jackson, Sarel Louw; Con: Jandré Blom; Pen: Jandré Blom

Boland Stadium, Wellington
Referee: Jonathan Kaplan (South Africa)

19:00 2008-10-18

Valke	24 – 29	Platinum Leopards
Tries: Dewald Coetzee, Hanno Coetzee, Petrus van Rooyen; Con: Jeffrey Perkins, Petrus van Rooyen (2); Pen: Jeffrey Perkins		Tries: Jan Van Zyl, Willem Bouwer; Con: Clayton Durand (2); Pen: Clayton Durand (5)

Bosman Stadium, Brakpan
Referee: Willie Roos (South Africa)

=== Round 2 ===
16:00 2008-10-24

Boland Kavaliers	42 – 50	Griffons
Tries: Angelo Brinkhuys, Bradley Mockford, Deon Scholtz (2), Dewey Swartbooi, Zolani Mofu; Con: Justin Peach (5), Lionel Cornelius; Pen:		Tries: Andries Kruger, Darryl Coeries, Hugo Kleynhans, Jacko Jackson, Jandré Blom, Jaun de Wit, Ockie van Zyl; Con: Jandré Blom (2), Kennedy Tsimba (4); Pen: DG: Jandré Blom

North West Stadium, Welkom
Referee: Craig Joubert (South Africa)

18:00 2008-10-24

Valke	19 – 27	Platinum Leopards
Tries: Petrus van Rooyen; Con: Petrus van Rooyen; Pen: Petrus van Rooyen		Tries: Jan Van Zyl, Vuyo Zangqa; Con: Diederik Botha; Pen: Clayton Durand (3), Diederik Botha (2)

Profert Olën Park, Potchefstroom
Referee: Marius Jonker (South Africa)

=== Promotion/relegation Table ===
Promotion/relegation
Team	P	W	D	L	PF	PA	PD	TF	TA	BP	Pts
Platinum Leopards	2	2	0	0	56	43	13	4	4	0	8
Boland Kavaliers	2	1	0	1	96	65	31	14	9	2	6
Griffons	2	1	0	1	65	96	-31	9	14	1	5
Valke	2	0	0	2	43	56	-13	4	4	1	1

=== Results ===
- Boland Kavaliers manage to stay in the Absa Currie Cup Premier Division.
- Platinum Leopards are promoted to the Absa Currie Cup Premier Division.
- The Griffons just lost out to the Boland Kavaliers to remain in the First Division.
- The Valke are relegated to the Absa Currie Cup First Division after losing both their matches against the Platinum Leopards.

== Statistics ==
=== Top 5 point scorers ===
Name	Team	Tries	Conversions	Penalties	Drop goals	Total
Clayton Durand	Platinum Leopards	0	43	29	1	176
Kennedy Tsimba	Griffons	4	14	24	0	120
Jeff Taljard	Border Bulldogs	3	14	16	0	91
Ambrose Barends	SWD Eagles	0	15	18	0	84
Rudi Vogt	Pumas	1	14	16	0	81

=== Top 5 try scorers ===
Name	Team	Tries
Deon van Rensburg	Platinum Leopards	11
Jan van Zyl	Platinum Leopards	10
Vuyo Zangqa	Platinum Leopards	10
Cecil Afrika	Griffons	8
Norman Nelson	Mighty Elephants	7

=== Disciplinary Records by Team ===
Team	Red Cards (red card)	Yellow Cards (yellow card)	Total Cards
Pumas	0	9	9
Mighty Elephants	1	6	7
Border Bulldogs	0	5	5
Platinum Leopards	0	5	5
Griffons	0	4	4
SWD Eagles	1	2	3

=== Top 5 Disciplinary Records by Player ===
Name	Team	Red Cards (red card)	Yellow Cards (yellow card)	Total Cards
Michael Vermaak	Mighty Elephants	1	0	1
Doppies le Roux	SWD Eagles	1	0	1
Shaun Jacques Nel	Mighty Elephants	0	3	3
Nomani Tonga	Border Bulldogs	0	2	2
Jacques Coetzee	Pumas	0	2	2

== See also ==
- 2008 Currie Cup Premier Division
- ABSA
- Currie Cup
