= Japie Nel =

South African rugby union player

- Born: 20 November 1982 (age 43) Welkom, South Africa
- Height: 1.85 m (6 ft 1 in)
- Weight: 117 kg (18 st 6 lb; 258 lb)
- School: Goudveld High School, Welkom

Rugby union career
- Position: Centre
Amateur team(s)
Years	Team	Apps	(Points)
2004–2007	Welkom Rovers		
Senior career
Years	Team	Apps	(Points)
2005–2007	Griffons	35	(45)
2008–2010	Leopards	35	(20)
2011–2016	Griffons	91	(190)
2018	Griffons	3	(15)
- Correct as of 27 October 2018

Japie Nel (born 20 November 1982 in Welkom, South Africa) is a South African rugby union player who last played for the Griffons in the Currie Cup. His regular position is centre.

Nel made in excess of one hundred career appearances. The majority of those appearances came for his hometown side, the Griffons.

== Career ==
=== Griffons ===
Nel played club rugby for Welkom Rovers in 2004 and 2005. In 2005, he was one of a number of club players included in a Griffons side that played against the Sharks in a pre-season match. This led to his inclusion in their squad for the 2005 Currie Cup competition and he made his first class debut for them in a qualifying round match against Griquas. He scored seven tries in the 2007 Currie Cup First Division season, including a hat-trick in their match against the Mighty Elephants, with Griffons coach, Harry Pienaar, calling Nel "devastating". He was also named the Griffons Back of the Year for 2007.

=== Leopards ===
He joined Potchefstroom-based side the Leopards for three seasons between 2008 and 2010. Nel played in all the Leopards matches during the 2008 Currie Cup First Division season, but missed the final, which the Leopards lost to his former side the Griffons. However the Leopards bounced back to win the two-legged promotion/relegation matches, with Nel playing in one of the matches against the Falcons to earn the Leopards a spot in the Premier Division for 2009. Nel only made four appearances during that competition, but remained a regular in their Vodacom Cup side.

=== Return to Griffons ===
He returned to Welkom in 2011 to rejoin the Griffons, resuming where he left off by performing to such an extent that he was once again named the Griffons Back of the Year after the 2011 Currie Cup First Division season.

In total, Nel played in excess of fifty matches for them during his second spell, averaging about one try every two matches.

He was also a key member of their 2014 Currie Cup First Division-winning side. He played in the final and helped the Griffons win the match 23–21 to win their first trophy for six years.
