= Doppies la Grange =

South African rugby union player

- Full name: Gideon la Grange
- Born: 2 December 1981 (age 44) Sasolburg, South Africa
- Height: 1.82 m (5 ft 11 1/2 in)
- Weight: 97 kg (15 st 4 lb; 214 lb)
- School: Port Natal High School, Durban
- University: Rand Afrikaans University

Rugby union career
- Position: Centre
Youth career
- 2002: Golden Lions
Senior career
Years	Team	Apps	(Points)
2003–2012	Golden Lions	102	(135)
2003–2006	Cats	17	(5)
2007–2012	Lions	52	(20)
2012–2013	Benetton Treviso	9	(10)
2014	Griquas	6	(0)
2003–2014	Total	186	(170)
- Correct as of 11 October 2014
Coaching career
- Years: Team
- 2015–present: Limpopo Blue Bulls U21

Gideon "Doppies" la Grange (born 2 December 1981) is a former South African rugby union footballer that played as a centre between 2003 and 2014.

== Career ==
=== Golden Lions / Lions / Cats ===
He spent the majority of his career at Johannesburg-based side the Golden Lions. Between 2003 and 2012, he made in excess of 100 appearances for the side in the domestic Currie Cup and Vodacom Cup competitions. He also played for their affiliated Super Rugby team – called the Cats until 2006 and the Lions since 2007 – during the same period, making 69 appearances and scoring five tries.

=== Treviso ===
He signed a two-year contract at Benetton Treviso prior to the 2012–13 Pro12 season. However, in October 2013, after an injury-ridden spell at Benetton Treviso, he left the club, having made just nine appearances and scoring two tries.

=== Griquas ===
He returned to South Africa to join Griquas for a short spell during the 2014 Currie Cup Premier Division. He made six appearances during the competition before retiring from the sport after their final match of the season against the Blue Bulls.
