= Len Olivier =

South African rugby union player

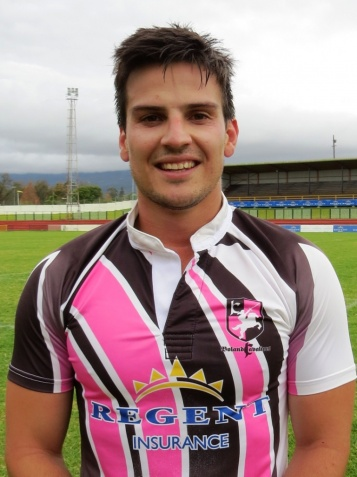
- Full name: Leonard Olivier
- Born: 19 January 1986 (age 40) Pretoria, South Africa
- Height: 1.80 m (5 ft 11 in)
- Weight: 89 kg (14 st 0 lb; 196 lb)
- School: Afrikaanse Hoër Seunskool, Pretoria
- University: University of Pretoria

Rugby union career
- Position: Fly-half
- Current team: Griquas
Youth career
- 2003–2006: Blue Bulls
Senior career
Years	Team	Apps	(Points)
2006	Blue Bulls	12	(76)
2007–2008	Falcons	33	(112)
2009	Sharks (Currie Cup)	7	(17)
2009–2010	Montauban	6	(31)
2011–2012	Oyonnax	24	(170)
2012–2013	Colomiers	11	(52)
2013–2014	Boland Cavaliers	6	(38)
2014	Griquas	0	(0)
2014–present	Vannes	2	(16)
- Correct as of 11 October 2014

Leonard Olivier (born 19 January 1986 in Pretoria, South Africa) is a South African rugby union player, currently playing with French Fédérale 1 side Vannes. His regular position is fly-half.

== Career ==
=== Youth ===
Olivier represented the Blue Bulls in the Under-18 Craven Week competition in 2003 and 2004. He played for the Blue Bulls U19 side in 2005 and for the Blue Bulls U21 side in 2005 and 2006.

=== Blue Bulls ===
His first class debut came during the 2006 Vodacom Cup competition, coming on as a late substitute in the match against the Free State Cheetahs in Bloemfontein. He scored his first senior points within a minute of coming on when he slotted a conversion for the away side. Despite starting in just six of the Blue Bulls' thirteen matches (and being a substitute in six more), Olivier ended the season with a tally of 76 points, which put him joint-eleventh in the competition.

=== Falcons ===
In 2007, Olivier moved to East Rand-based side the Falcons. He remained with the Falcons for two seasons and made more than 30 appearances in both the Vodacom Cup and Currie Cup competitions. However, he could not prevent the team getting relegated from the Premier Division of the Currie Cup at the end of the 2008 season.

=== Sharks ===
He then joined Durban-based outfit the Sharks, where he played in six of the side's matches during 2009 Vodacom Cup, scoring 15 points off the boot. He was included in the matchday squad for one match during the 2009 Currie Cup Premier Division, against the Bulls in Durban, but failed to make an appearance.

=== Montauban / Oyonnax / Colomiers ===
Olivier then went to France, where he joined Montauban for the 2009–10 Top 14 season. He made just six appearances and was released by the side after they were declared bankrupt at the end of the season.

He remained in France and joined Oyonnax for the 2011–12 Rugby Pro D2 season, appearing in 24 of their 30 matches during the season and scoring 170 points.

He moved clubs once again for the 2012–13 Rugby Pro D2 season, joining Colomiers, making eleven appearances.

=== Boland Cavaliers ===
Olivier returned to South Africa in 2013 by joining Wellington-based side Boland Cavaliers for the 2013 Currie Cup First Division competition. Olivier contributed 38 points during their campaign despite missing parts of the season through injury.

=== Griquas ===
In 2014, Olivier was included in the Griquas squad for the 2014 Currie Cup qualification competition. However, he made no appearances for the side.

=== Vannes ===
He returned to France to join Fédérale 1 side Vannes for the 2014–2015 season where he played 17 games in that season taking his number of 1st class appearances over 100 in his career <itsrugby.com>

=== Rugby Coaching ===
Olivier started coaching in 2016 at the University of Pretoria where he coached the TUKS u/21 side. They won both the Assupol Blue Bulls Club Championship vs UJ & the Carlton Cup with the 2nd highest score of all time beating the Dragons 83 - 11.

Olivier was then promoted to coach the University of Pretoria 1st Team in 2017. They are currently through to the Semi finals of The CarltonCup.

He is now also the Head coach of the Elite Team at The Blue Bulls Tuks Rugby Academy. <bluebullstuksrugbyacademy.co.za/management>

Olivier has also decided to coach the Backline of The Limpopo Blue Bulls U/20 team. They are currently busy competing in the U/20 Currie Cup.
