= 2006 Vodacom Cup =

- Champions: Falcons
- Matches played: 92

The 2006 Vodacom Cup was the 9th edition of this annual domestic cup competition. The Vodacom Cup is played between provincial rugby union teams in South Africa from the Currie Cup Premier and First Divisions.

== Competition ==
There were 14 teams participating in the 2006 Vodacom Cup competition. All these teams played in a group stage, where teams would play all the teams once over the course of the season, either at home or away.

Teams received four points for a win and two points for a draw. Bonus points were awarded to teams that score four or more tries in a game, as well as to teams losing a match by seven points or less. Teams were ranked by points, then points difference (points scored less points conceded).

The top two teams in the group stage qualified for the final, where the team that finished first in the group stage had home advantage against the teams that finished second.

== Teams ==
Location of teams in 2006 Vodacom Cup

=== Changes from 2005 ===
- The two sections were scrapped and all teams were played in one single pool.

=== Team Listing ===
The following teams took part in the 2006 Vodacom Cup competitions:

2006 Vodacom Cup
Team	Stadium/s
Border Bulldogs	Absa Stadium, East London
Boland Cavaliers	Boland Stadium, Wellington
Golden Lions	Ellis Park Stadium, Johannesburg
Griffons	North West Stadium, Welkom
Leopards	Olën Park, Potchefstroom
Leopards	Vryburg
Falcons	Bosman Stadium, Brakpan
Mighty Elephants	EPRU Stadium, Port Elizabeth
Mighty Elephants	WJ de Wet Stadium, Despatch
Natal Wildebeest	Kings Park Stadium, Durban
Pumas	@lantic Park, Witbank
Pumas	Ellis Park Stadium, Johannesburg
SWD Eagles	Outeniqua Park, George
SWD Eagles	Greenhaven Sports Stadium, Great Brak River
SWD Eagles	Pacaltsdorp
Blue Bulls	Loftus Versfeld, Pretoria
Free State Cheetahs	Vodacom Park, Bloemfontein
Western Province	Newlands Stadium, Cape Town
Griquas	Griqua Park, Kimberley

== Tables ==
2006 Vodacom Cup Table
	Team	Played	Won	Drawn	Lost	Points For	Points Against	Points Difference	Tries For	Tries Against	Try Bonus	Losing Bonus	Points
1	Natal Wildebeest	13	11	1	1	490	206	+284	68	21	9	1	56
2	Falcons	13	10	0	3	435	284	+151	52	30	8	2	50
3	Blue Bulls	13	9	0	4	383	278	+105	46	29	7	2	45
4	Golden Lions	13	7	1	5	328	297	+31	42	36	5	3	38
5	Pumas	13	7	0	6	371	264	+107	36	27	5	4	37
6	Boland Cavaliers	13	7	0	6	395	331	+64	54	40	7	2	37
7	Western Province	13	7	0	6	375	330	+45	48	36	5	3	36
8	Free State Cheetahs	13	7	1	5	344	368	-24	48	49	6	0	36
9	Griquas	13	6	2	5	374	349	+25	43	42	6	1	35
10	Leopards	13	7	0	6	366	395	-29	49	47	5	1	34
11	Griffons	13	3	1	9	314	381	-67	29	51	2	3	19
12	Mighty Elephants	13	3	0	10	290	457	-167	32	60	3	3	18
13	Border Bulldogs	13	3	0	10	262	468	-206	31	63	3	3	18
14	SWD Eagles	13	1	0	12	263	582	-319	30	77	3	3	10
The top 2 teams qualified for the Final. Note: These are the final tables as per the official site, however Falcons had home advantage in the final, the reason for this venue switch is unknown. Points breakdown: *4 points for a win *2 points for a draw *1 bonus point for a loss by seven points or less *1 bonus point for scoring four or more tries in a match

== Results ==
=== Round One ===
2006-02-10	Free State Cheetahs	8–36	Blue Bulls	Vodacom Park, Bloemfontein
	Try: Johannes Urbanus Hellmuth; Pen: Leon Minnaar van den Heever	Scoreboard	Try: Cornelis Hermanus Vermaas, Danwel Demas, Derick Kuun, John Mametsa, Lukhanyo Nontshinga; Con: Jacques-Louis Potgieter (3), Leonard Olivier; Pen: Jacques-Louis Potgieter	Attendance: 8000

2006-02-10	Mighty Elephants	26–17	Western Province	EPRU Stadium, Port Elizabeth
		Scoreboard

2006-02-11	Leopards	25–44	Pumas	Olën Park, Potchefstroom
		Scoreboard

2006-02-11	SWD Eagles	9–51	Natal Wildebeest	Outeniqua Park, George
		Scoreboard

2006-02-11	Griffons	22–28	Falcons	North West Stadium, Welkom
		Scoreboard

2006-02-11	Boland Cavaliers	40–19	Griquas	Boland Stadium, Wellington
		Scoreboard

=== Round Two ===
2006-02-17	Boland Cavaliers	17–31	Pumas	Boland Stadium, Wellington
		Scoreboard

2006-02-17	Mighty Elephants	31–36	Griquas	EPRU Stadium, Port Elizabeth
		Scoreboard

2006-02-18	Natal Wildebeest	22–13	Blue Bulls	Absa Stadium, Durban
	Try: Brett Hennessey, Cedric Mkhize, Jaco Gouws; Con: Steve Meyer (2); Pen: Steve Meyer	Scoreboard	Try: Rudolf Coetzee; Con: Jacques-Louis Potgieter; Pen: Jacques-Louis Potgieter (2)	Attendance: 1000

2006-02-18	Griffons	60–10	Border Bulldogs	North West Stadium, Welkom
		Scoreboard

2006-02-18	SWD Eagles	6–38	Falcons	Outeniqua Park, George
		Scoreboard

2006-02-18	Western Province	20–24	Golden Lions	Newlands Stadium, Cape Town
		Scoreboard

=== Round Three ===
2006-02-24	Griquas	42–48	Western Province	Griqua Park, Kimberley
		Scoreboard

2006-02-24	Falcons	26–15	Free State Cheetahs	Bosman Stadium, Brakpan
		Scoreboard

2006-02-24	Pumas	35–29	Golden Lions	@lantic Park, Witbank
		Scoreboard

2006-02-24	Border Bulldogs	21–39	Blue Bulls	Absa Stadium, East London
	Try: Dumisani Matyeshana (2); Con: Luyolo Vusile Tobezweni; Pen: Luyolo Vusile Tobezweni (3)	Scoreboard	Try: Adriaan Strauss, Cornelis Hermanus Vermaas, Danwel Demas, Hilton Lobberts, Rudolf Coetzee, Tim Dlulane; Con: Jacques-Louis Potgieter (3); Pen: Jacques-Louis Potgieter	Attendance: 2000

2006-02-24	Mighty Elephants	32–33	Leopards	EPRU Stadium, Port Elizabeth
		Scoreboard

2006-02-25	SWD Eagles	23–33	Griffons	Outeniqua Park, George
		Scoreboard

=== Round Four ===
2006-03-03	Griquas	38–38	Free State Cheetahs	Griqua Park, Kimberley
		Scoreboard

2006-03-03	Border Bulldogs	17–7	Mighty Elephants	Absa Stadium, East London
		Scoreboard

2006-03-03	Griffons	20–10	Boland Cavaliers	North West Stadium, Welkom
		Scoreboard

2006-03-03	Falcons	7–6	Golden Lions	Bosman Stadium, Brakpan
		Scoreboard

2006-03-04	Western Province	19–51	Natal Wildebeest	Newlands Stadium, Cape Town
		Scoreboard

2006-03-04	Leopards	49–28	SWD Eagles	Olën Park, Potchefstroom
		Scoreboard

2006-03-04	Pumas	12–21	Blue Bulls	@lantic Park, Witbank
	Pen: Jeandre Fourie (4)	Scoreboard	Try: Derick Kuun, Hilton Lobberts; Con: Jacques-Louis Potgieter; Pen: Jacques-Louis Potgieter (3)	Attendance: 1500

=== Round Five ===
2006-03-10	Pumas	15–17	Free State Cheetahs	@lantic Park, Witbank
		Scoreboard

2006-03-10	Falcons	21–27	Western Province	Bosman Stadium, Brakpan
		Scoreboard

2006-03-10	Leopards	19–17	Blue Bulls	Olën Park, Potchefstroom
	Try: Naude Beukes, Werner Pieterse; Pen: Anvor Schooney (3)	Scoreboard	Try: Marius Delport; Pen: Leonard Olivier	Attendance: 1000

2006-03-10	Border Bulldogs	13–15	Golden Lions	Absa Stadium, East London
		Scoreboard

2006-03-11	Griquas	22–40	Natal Wildebeest	Griqua Park, Kimberley
		Scoreboard

2006-03-11	Boland Cavaliers	76–22	SWD Eagles	Boland Stadium, Wellington
		Scoreboard

2006-03-11	Griffons	34–38	Mighty Elephants	North West Stadium, Welkom
		Scoreboard

=== Round Six ===
2006-03-17	Pumas	14–15	Western Province	@lantic Park, Witbank
		Scoreboard

2006-03-17	Border Bulldogs	14–20	Free State Cheetahs	Absa Stadium, East London
		Scoreboard

2006-03-17	Leopards	15–14	Golden Lions	Olën Park, Potchefstroom
		Scoreboard

2006-03-18	Griffons	6–30	Blue Bulls	North West Stadium, Welkom
	Pen: Andries Hough (2)	Scoreboard	Try: Adriaan Fondse, Chiliboy Ralepelle, John Mametsa (2); Con: Leonard Olivier (2); Pen: Leonard Olivier (2)

2006-03-18	Falcons	34–31	Natal Wildebeest	Bosman Stadium, Brakpan
		Scoreboard

2006-03-18	Mighty Elephants	16–31	Boland Cavaliers	WJ de Wet Stadium, Despatch
		Scoreboard

=== Round Seven ===
2006-03-24	Border Bulldogs	9–18	Western Province	Absa Stadium, East London
		Scoreboard

2006-03-25	SWD Eagles	36–43	Mighty Elephants	Outeniqua Park, George
		Scoreboard

2006-03-25	Falcons	33–6	Griquas	Bosman Stadium, Brakpan
		Scoreboard

2006-03-25	Pumas	13–26	Natal Wildebeest	@lantic Park, Witbank
		Scoreboard

2006-03-25	Boland Cavaliers	38–35	Blue Bulls	Boland Stadium, Wellington
	Try: Enrico Swartz, Jacobus Johannes (Kobus) Meintjes, Nicolas Francois Prinsloo, Pieter Barend Wium, Willie Bower; Con: Justin Peach (5); Pen: Justin Peach	Scoreboard	Try: Derick Kuun, Lukhanyo Nontshinga, Marius Delport, Ruan Vermeulen; Con: Leonard Olivier (3); Pen: Leonard Olivier (2) Jacques-Louis Potgieter	Attendance: 3400

2006-03-25	Griffons	32–51	Golden Lions	North West Stadium, Welkom
		Scoreboard

2006-03-25	Leopards	48–17	Free State Cheetahs	Olën Park, Potchefstroom
		Scoreboard

=== Round Eight ===
2006-03-31	Griquas	24–24	Golden Lions	Griqua Park, Kimberley
		Scoreboard

2006-03-31	Mighty Elephants	9–15	Pumas	EPRU Stadium, Port Elizabeth
		Scoreboard

2006-04-01	Natal Wildebeest	51–14	Free State Cheetahs	Absa Stadium, Durban
		Scoreboard

2006-04-01	SWD Eagles	37–29	Border Bulldogs	Greenhaven Sports Stadium, Great Brak River
		Scoreboard

2006-04-01	Falcons	29–50	Blue Bulls	Bosman Stadium, Brakpan
	Try: Brendon April, Jacques Nieuwenhuis, Jan Hendrik Cloete, Sarel Pretorius; Con: Riaan Viljoen (3); Pen: Riaan Viljoen	Scoreboard	Try: Curlian John Genis, Hennie Daniller, Leonard Olivier, Luvuyo Mhlobiso, Marius Delport, Neil Powell; Con: Leonard Olivier (4); Pen: Leonard Olivier (3); Drop: Leonard Olivier	Attendance: 1500

2006-04-01	Boland Cavaliers	39–25	Leopards	Boland Stadium, Wellington
		Scoreboard

=== Round Nine ===
2006-04-07	Griquas	19–15	Pumas	Griqua Park, Kimberley
		Scoreboard

2006-04-07	Border Bulldogs	8–49	Natal Wildebeest	Absa Stadium, East London
		Scoreboard

2006-04-07	SWD Eagles	18–21	Blue Bulls	Outeniqua Park, George
	Pen: Rynhard van As (6)	Scoreboard	Try: Emile Verster, Neil Powell; Con: Leonard Olivier; Pen: Jacques-Louis Potgieter (3)	Attendance: 3205

2006-04-08	Boland Cavaliers	18–27	Golden Lions	Boland Stadium, Wellington
		Scoreboard

2006-04-08	Leopards	35–28	Western Province	Rus Vryburg
		Scoreboard

2006-04-08	Griffons	25–41	Free State Cheetahs	North West Stadium, Welkom
		Scoreboard

=== Round Ten ===
2006-04-12	Griffons	21–43	Western Province	North West Stadium, Welkom
		Scoreboard

2006-04-13	Boland Cavaliers	20–34	Free State Cheetahs	Boland Stadium, Wellington
		Scoreboard

2006-04-13	Border Bulldogs	20–27	Griquas	Absa Stadium, East London
		Scoreboard

2006-04-13	Leopards	16–38	Natal Wildebeest	Olën Park, Potchefstroom
		Scoreboard

2006-04-13	Mighty Elephants	22–43	Blue Bulls	EPRU Stadium, Port Elizabeth
	Try: Chris Jonck, Noel Richard de Villiers, Sivuyile Kobokana; Con: Michael Allen Gallinetti (2); Pen: Michael Allen Gallinetti	Scoreboard	Try: Athenkosi Mtya, Frikkie Welsh (2), Marius Delport, Neil Powell (2); Con: Leonard Olivier (5); Pen: Jacques-Louis Potgieter	Attendance: 800

2006-04-15	SWD Eagles	22–27	Golden Lions	Outeniqua Park, George
		Scoreboard

2006-04-15	Pumas	41–44	Falcons	Ellis Park Stadium, Johannesburg
		Scoreboard

=== Round Eleven ===
2006-04-21	Pumas	46–7	Border Bulldogs	@lantic Park, Witbank
		Scoreboard

2006-04-21	Griquas	41–6	Griffons	Griqua Park, Kimberley
		Scoreboard

2006-04-21	Leopards	23–30	Falcons	Olën Park, Potchefstroom
		Scoreboard

2006-04-21	Mighty Elephants	31–42	Free State Cheetahs	EPRU Stadium, Port Elizabeth
		Scoreboard

2006-04-22	Blue Bulls	8–31	Golden Lions	Loftus Versfeld, Pretoria
	Try: Marius Delport; Pen: Leonard Olivier	Scoreboard	Try: Edrick van Tonder, James Joseph van der Walt, Louis Ludik; Con: Quintin Jean van Tonder (2); Pen: Quintin Jean van Tonder (4)	Attendance: 2500

2006-04-22	SWD Eagles	15–70	Western Province	Outeniqua Park, George
		Scoreboard

2006-04-22	Boland Cavaliers	9–11	Natal Wildebeest	Boland Stadium, Wellington
		Scoreboard

=== Round Twelve ===
2006-04-27	Pumas	37–27	Griffons	@lantic Park, Witbank
		Scoreboard

2006-04-28	Golden Lions	17–42	Free State Cheetahs	Ellis Park Stadium, Johannesburg
		Scoreboard

2006-04-28	Falcons	29–36	Boland Cavaliers	Bosman Stadium, Brakpan
		Scoreboard

2006-04-28	Griquas	49–15	SWD Eagles	Griqua Park, Kimberley
		Scoreboard

2006-04-28	Border Bulldogs	46–35	Leopards	Absa Stadium, East London
		Scoreboard

2006-04-28	Mighty Elephants	20–71	Natal Wildebeest	EPRU Stadium, Port Elizabeth
		Scoreboard

2006-04-29	Blue Bulls	45–35	Western Province	Loftus Versfeld, Pretoria
	Try: Emile Verster, Jacques-Louis Potgieter, Lukhanyo Nontshinga, Marius Delport; Con: Jacques-Louis Potgieter (4); Pen: Jacques-Louis Potgieter (3); Drop: Jacques-Louis Potgieter	Scoreboard	Try: Corné Uys, Francois Louw, Huia Edmonds (2); Con: Morgan Newman, Sarel Potgieter (2); Pen: Morgan Newman, Sarel Potgieter (2)	Attendance: 1500

=== Round Thirteen ===
2006-05-05	Border Bulldogs	50–47	Boland Cavaliers	Absa Stadium, East London
		Scoreboard

2006-05-05	Free State Cheetahs	13–23	Western Province	Vodacom Park, Bloemfontein
		Scoreboard

2006-05-05	Pumas	53–8	SWD Eagles	@lantic Park, Witbank
		Scoreboard

2006-05-05	Falcons	48–3	Mighty Elephants	Bosman Stadium, Brakpan
		Scoreboard

2006-05-06	Griquas	17–25	Blue Bulls	Griqua Park, Kimberley
	Try: Lafras Uys, MJ Mentz; Con: Zane Kirchner (2); Pen: Zane Kirchner	Scoreboard	Try: Lukhanyo Nontshinga, Marius Delport, Riaan van der Bergh; Con: Jacques-Louis Potgieter (2); Pen: Jacques-Louis Potgieter (2)	Attendance: 1000

2006-05-06	Leopards	29–28	Griffons	Olën Park, Potchefstroom
		Scoreboard

2006-05-06	Golden Lions	29–49	Natal Wildebeest	Ellis Park Stadium, Johannesburg
		Scoreboard

=== Round Fourteen ===
2006-05-12	Griffons	0–0	Natal Wildebeest	North West Stadium, Welkom
		Scoreboard

2006-05-12	Mighty Elephants	12–34	Golden Lions	EPRU Stadium, Port Elizabeth
		Scoreboard

2006-05-12	Falcons	68–18	Border Bulldogs	Bosman Stadium, Brakpan
		Scoreboard

2006-05-13	Griquas	34–14	Leopards	Griqua Park, Kimberley
		Scoreboard

2006-05-13	Boland Cavaliers	14–12	Western Province	Newlands Stadium, Cape Town
		Scoreboard

2006-05-13	SWD Eagles	24–43	Free State Cheetahs	Pacaltsdorp
		Scoreboard

=== Final ===
2006-05-20	Falcons	25–17	Natal Wildebeest	Bosman Stadium, Brakpan
		Scoreboard

== Winners ==
2006
Vodacom Cup
CHAMPIONS
Falcons
1st title
