= Earl Rose (rugby union) =

South African rugby union player

- Full name: Earl Enver Rose
- Born: 12 January 1984 (age 42) Strand, Western Cape, South Africa
- Height: 1.79 m (5 ft 10 1/2 in)
- Weight: 80 kg (12 st 8 lb; 176 lb)
- School: Strand High School
- Notable relative: Jody Rose

Rugby union career
- Position: Fullback / Fly-half
Youth career
- 2002–2003: Western Province
Senior career
Years	Team	Apps	(Points)
2004–2005	Western Province	10	(43)
2006–2010	Cats / Lions (Super Rugby)	49	(178)
2006–2010	Golden Lions	54	(342)
2011	Stormers (Super Rugby)	2	(2)
2011	Griquas	19	(74)
- Correct as of 12:03, 25 January 2012 (UTC)
International career
Years	Team	Apps	(Points)
2003	South Africa (sevens)	??	(??)
2003	South Africa (U19)	??	(??)
2004–2005	South Africa (U21)	??	(??)
2008–2009	South Africa	0	(0)
- Correct as of 12:03, 25 January 2012 (UTC)

Earl Rose (born 12 January 1984, in Strand, Western Cape) is a South African rugby union player who, although keen on fly-half, features primarily at fullback. He first came to prominence with the surprising inclusion in Springbok coach Peter de Villiers's 42-man training squad in 2008. He played for the Golden Lions in the Currie Cup until 2009 and turned out for the Lions in the 2010 Super 14 season. In 2011 he was drafted into the Stormers team on tour in Australasia. Earl has since moved back to Strand where he helped his local club Sirlowrians gain promotion to the top tier of club rugby in the Western Cape. His excellent form was rewarded by His selection for Western Province sevens team in 2014.

== Career overview ==
In 1999, Rose was selected for the Western Province Under-Fifteen Merit Team, an accolade followed up two years later with his inclusion in the Under-Sixteen WP Academy. He played in Hoërskool Strand's First XV from 2000 to 2002, in which year he also made the WP Under-Eighteen Craven Week, the WP Under-Nineteen squad, the SA Schools team for matches against France and Wales, and the South African Under-Nineteen training squad. 2003 brought the IRB Sevens World Series in New Zealand and Brisbane, Australia, and the SA Under-Nineteen FIRA-AER World Championship. He was included in the Western Province Under-Twenty squad in 2004 and, three seasons later, the Lions Super 14 outfit. There followed De Villiers's training squad.

He was also selected as the only flyhalf for the Springbok tour of the UK in 2008, a move that has aroused further controversy, the South African Press Association describing it as a "shock". In retrospect, respected sports columnist Luke Alfred dubbed the decision "short-sighted", arguing that his place ought to have gone to Morné Steyn.

A disappointing 2010 Super 14 campaign led to Rose being dropped by the Lions starting 15. He played in the Vodacom Cup during 2011 for the Griquas and once the competition concluded he was offered a short-term contract to play for the Stormers in Super Rugby.

However, Griquas didn't extend his contract for the 2012 season and Rose joined the Eastern Province Kings on a trial.

== Personal life ==
Rose was educated at Rusthof Primary School and Hoërskool Strand, and is currently 1.80 metres tall and 77 kilograms in weight. He told SA Sports Illustrated, however, that he was looking to bulk up in a bid to stake his claim on the Lions' fly-half position.

Rose counts among his hobbies reading and listening to music, of which his favourite genre is R&B. His all-time favourite player is Jason Robinson, but he also holds Chester Williams in lofty regard, having read his autobiography and been coached by him in the SA Sevens side. The one person whom he most admires, however, is his father Enver, who "helped us [he and his brother Jody, who is also a professional rugby player] through many tough times. I was fairly young when we moved to the Lions. My parents were very supportive and encouraged us to believe in God and leave everything up to Him."

In January 2019 video footage emerged appearing to show Rose and a female counterpart colluding to steal golf clubs out of the bags of members of Stellenbosch Golf Club. The golf club confirmed that the incident was being investigated by police and would not rule out Rose, but could not comment while the investigation was pending, while it was also uncovered that Rose belonged to a group that sold second hand golf equipment online. The stolen clubs were returned, but charges were laid against Rose who handed himself over to the police and appeared in court on a charge of theft.
