= Port Natal High School =

High school in KwaZulu-Natal, South Africa

- Durban, KwaZulu-Natal; South Africa

Information
- School type: Public & Boarding
- Motto: Lux et Ductus
- Religious affiliation: Christianity
- Established: 1941
- Grades: 1-12
- Gender: Boys & Girls
- Age: 5 to 18
- Colours: Navy, Yellow & White
- Nickname: Porties

Port Natal High School (Afrikaans: Port Natal Skool is a public co-ed high school for Afrikaans speaking students in Umbilo, a middle class suburb of Durban, KwaZulu-Natal, South Africa. It was founded in 1941 and has over 700 students from Grade 1 – 12.
