= Lungelo Payi =

South African rugby union player

- Full name: Lungelo Payi
- Born: 22 May 1981 (age 45) Peelton
- Height: 1.92 m (6 ft 3 1/2 in)
- Weight: 115 kg (254 lb; 18 st 2 lb)
- School: Phillip Mtywakuss

Rugby union career
- Position: Lock
- Current team: Boland Cavaliers
Youth career
- 2002: Border Bulldogs
Senior career
Years	Team	Apps	(Points)
2003–2005	Border Bulldogs		
2006	Western Province	6	(5)
2006–2007	Border Bulldogs	22	(5)
2008	Falcons	8	(0)
2010–2011	Eastern Province Kings	16	(0)
2012–present	Boland Cavaliers	11	(5)
- Correct as of 14:32, 9 Oct 2012 (UTC)
International career
Years	Team	Apps	(Points)
2009	Southern Kings		
- Correct as of 14:32, 9 Oct 2012 (UTC)

Lungelo Payi (born 22 May 1981) is a former South African rugby union player who played with the Eastern Province Kings.

He started playing his rugby for the Border Bulldogs in 2003. He then moved to Western Province and played for Border Bulldogs again, as well as the Falcons. In 2009, he was playing club rugby with False Bay Rugby Club when he got a surprise call-up to the Southern Kings squad for their game against the British and Irish Lions. In 2010, he moved back to the Eastern Cape region and joined Eastern Province Kings for the 2010 Currie Cup First Division season. He is currently a sports commentator and runs a number of youth rugby development programmes and manages a number of professional players through his sports management company.
