= Hoërskool Strand =

Afrikaans medium public high school in South Africa

Location
- Strand, Western Cape; South Africa; 34°6′7″S 18°50′22″E

Information
- Type: Public High School
- Motto: Volhard en Oorwin
- Established: 1962
- Headmaster: Mr Danie Malan
- Grades: 8–12
- Enrollment: 1 094
- Mascot: Eagle
- Website: www.hsstrand.co.za

Hoërskool Strand (English: Strand High School) is an Afrikaans high school located in Strand, South Africa. 1 089 students attend the school, mostly residents of Strand, although students from as far as Gordon's Bay, Somerset West, and even Grabouw attend the school. The school is the major provider of secondary education in the area and is headmastered by Mr Danie Malan, that took the lead from former headmaster Mr Christiaan Klopper. With the post-war growth of the Hottentots Holland district, in 1962 a second High School (Afrikaans medium) was opened, which mainly served the Strand.

Hoërskool Strand has four quarters in a school year, from January to December. The school provides classes from grade eight to grade twelve (the latter also known as matric).

== Sport ==
Hoërskool Strand competes in inter-schools activities with neighbouring schools Parel Vallei High School and Hottentots Holland High School. They also compete against tour groups, such as the Bablake School from England, which last toured Strand in mid-2010. The sports in which it competes include rugby, cricket, hockey, netball, squash, tennis and chess. Sports activities which are not limited to inter-school competition include swimming and surfing.

The school also has a strong academical focus, but it is considered by most to be concentrating on excelling in the sports-world. A school rule requiring students to take part in at least one winter- and one summer activity, introduced at the beginning of 2006, is evidence of the school's goal to become a sport power within the school circles in the area. They succeeded in winning the winter-interschools again in 2006 by beating Hottentots Holland in the main rugby match of the day.

On 14 October 2006, the school sent a year 11 student, Corné Blaauw, to compete in the World Junior Chess Championship which was held in Georgia.

== Academic ==
Academically the school also excels on national front.

The school provides a wide variety of subjects to its students. Students are required to take the default list of subjects in grade 8 and 9, with the option to take English as a Home language, however Afrikaans Home Language is compulsory for every grade. Students can also take German as a second additional language. Grade 9 students have the opportunity to choose a combination of Arts, Music, Dramatic Arts as subjects.

Here is a list of the subjects presented at Strand High School :

- Language, Literacy and Communication
  - Afrikaans Home Language / Afrikaans Huistaal
  - English Home Language / Engels Huistaal
  - English First Additional Language / Engels Eerste Addisionele Taal
- Mathematics
  - Mathematics / Wiskunde
  - Mathematical Literacy / Wiskundige Geletterdheid
  - Additional Mathematics (ADMaths) can also be taken as an extra subject. **
- General Sciences
  - Physical Sciences / Fisiese Wetenskappe
  - Life Sciences / Lewenswetenskappe
  - Natural Sciences / Natuurwetenskappe (For Grades 8-9)
- Human and Social Sciences
  - History / Geskiedenis
  - Geography / Geografie
- Economics
  - Accounting / Rekeningkunde
  - Business Studies / Besigheidstudies
- Technology
  - Engineering Graphics and Design / Ingenieurs Grafika en Ontwerp (EGD / IGO)
  - Technology / Tegnologie (For Grades 8-9)
  - Digital Learning / Digitale Leer (For Grades 8-9) (DL)
  - Information Technology / Inligtings Tegnologie (IT)
  - Computer Application Technology / Rekenaar Toepassings Tegnologie (CAT / RTT)
- Life Skills / Arts
  - Life Orientation / Lewensorientering (LO)
  - Physical Education / Lewensorientering Prakties (PE / LOP)
  - Creative Arts / Skeppende Kunste (For Grades 8-9)
  - Visual arts / Visuele Kunste (KUNS)
  - Dramatic arts / Dramatiese Kunste (DRAMA)
  - Music / Musiek
- Other
  - German Second Additional Language
  - Tourism / Toerisme
  - Consumer Studies / Verbruikerstudie

Some of the subjects require minimum entry qualifications.

** ADMaths Classes are presented by Mrs. E. Loedolff (Grades 11/12) as well as Mrs. A. Marais (Grades 9/10)

== Suidooster ==
Named after the wind-direction that makes the Strand famous, the Suidooster newspaper is the official school newspaper, with an all-student editorial board, and two educators as head editors. The journalists chosen every year to serve the newspaper, are year 10 to year 11 students. Since the third school term of 2012, articles are published on the school newspaper.
