= Stephan Gerber =

South African rugby union player

- Full name: Stephan Ehlers Gerber
- Born: 27 August 1980 (age 46) Durban, South Africa
- Height: 1.95 m (6 ft 5 in)
- Weight: 116 kg (18 st 4 lb; 256 lb)
- School: Carolina High School, Carolina

Rugby union career
- Position: Lock
- Current team: Border Bulldogs
Senior career
Years	Team	Apps	(Points)
2005	Leopards	3	(0)
2006–2007	Pumas	29	(10)
2008	Griquas	21	(15)
2008–2013	Aurillac	100	(45)
2013–present	Border Bulldogs	12	(5)
- Correct as of 30 September 2013

Stephan Gerber (born 27 August 1980) is a South African rugby union player, currently playing with the Border Bulldogs. His regular position is lock or flanker.

== Career ==
He made his first class debut playing for the Leopards in the 2005 Vodacom Cup competition. He then spent two seasons in Witbank playing for the Pumas before he moved to Kimberley to play for Griquas in the 2008 season.

At the end of 2008, he joined French Rugby Pro D2 side Aurillac. He remained with them until the end of the 2012–13 season, making a hundred appearances.

In 2013, he returned to South Africa and joined East London-based side Border Bulldogs for the 2013 Currie Cup First Division season.
