= Rassie Jansen van Vuuren =

South African rugby union player

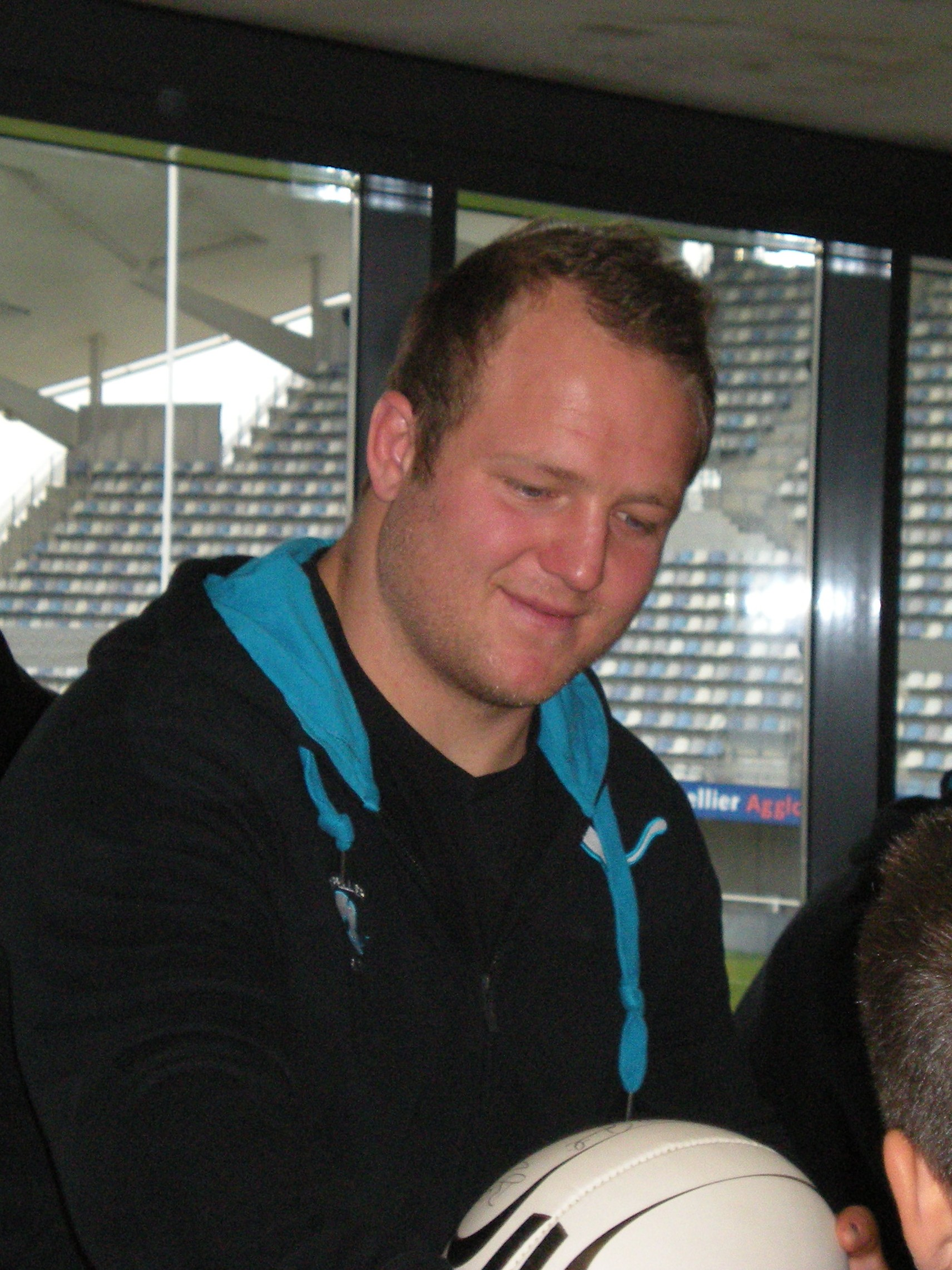
- Full name: Erasmus Albertus Jansen van Vuuren
- Born: 23 May 1985 (age 41) Potgietersrus, South Africa
- Height: 1.89 m (6 ft 2 1/2 in)
- Weight: 115 kg (18 st 2 lb; 254 lb)
- School: Hoërskool Nelspruit

Rugby union career
- Position: Prop / Hooker
Youth career
- 2003: Pumas
- 2004–2006: Golden Lions
Senior career
Years	Team	Apps	(Points)
2006–2007	Gaillac		
2007	Golden Lions	0	(0)
2007	Pumas	17	(25)
2008	Blue Bulls	9	(10)
2008	Falcons	5	(5)
2008–2011	Aurillac	70	(40)
2011–2013	Montpellier	51	(30)
2013–2015	La Rochelle	39	(20)
2015–2016	Bayonne	13	(0)
2016	Pumas	1	(0)
- Correct as of 24 July 2016

Erasmus Albertus Jansen van Vuuren (born 23 May 1985) is a South African rugby union player, whose usual position is prop or hooker.

After representing the Pumas at the Under-18 Craven Week in 2003, he joined the Golden Lions Academy, playing for them at Under-20 and Under-21 level in 2004 and 2005. He had a short spell at French Rugby Pro D2 side Gaillac during their 2006–07 season before returning to the Golden Lions. In 2007 and 2008, he made first class appearances for the Pumas, Blue Bulls and Falcons in South African rugby before returning to France, joining Aurillac for the 2008–09 Rugby Pro D2 season. After making 70 appearances in three seasons for Aurillac, he joined Top 14 side Montpellier prior to the 2011–12 Top 14 season. He spent two seasons in Montpellier before joining La Rochelle in the 2013–14 Rugby Pro D2 season. He helped them win promotion in his first season at the club and avoid relegation in the 2014–15 Top 14 season. He once again dropped into the Pro D2 for 2015–16, joining Bayonne. After one season there, he returned to South Africa to join the Pumas for the 2016 Currie Cup.
