= Jacques Coetzee =

South African rugby union player

- Born: Jacques Coetzee; 22 October 1984 (age 42) Bethal
- Height: 1.75 m (5 ft 9 in)
- Weight: 81 kg (12 st 11 lb)
- School: Volkskool High
- University: University of Johannesburg

Rugby union career
- Position: Scrum-half
- Current team: Griquas
Provincial / State sides
Years	Team	Apps	(Points)
2007–2010	Pumas	71	(65)
2011	Eastern Province Kings	18	(10)
2012–2013	Griquas	39	(30)
- Correct as of 26 October 2013
Super Rugby
Years	Team	Apps	(Points)
2010	Lions	10	(0)
2012	Cheetahs	1	(0)
- Correct as of 16 July 2012

Jacques Coetzee (born 22 October 1984) is a South African rugby union player.

He played for the Golden Lions in youth competitions, but moved to the Pumas in 2007. He played for them for four seasons, during which time he also represented the Royal XV in a game during the 2009 British & Irish Lions tour to South Africa. The following season, he was included in the 2010 Super 14 squad for the Lions. He signed for the Eastern Province Kings for 2011, but joined Griquas for 2012.
