= 2012 Eastern Province Kings season =

Team Information
- Stadium: Nelson Mandela Bay Stadium
- CEO: Anele Pamba
- Director of Rugby: Alan Solomons
- Coach: Alan Solomons (Vodacom Cup); Matt Sexton (Currie Cup)
- Captain: Luke Watson

Currie Cup First Division
- Rank: 1st Champions
- Record: Won 14, Drew 2
- Top points scorer: George Whitehead (142)
- Top try scorer: Luke Watson (12)

Vodacom Cup (South)
- Rank: 3rd (South); Lost in Quarter Finals
- Record: Won 5, Lost 3
- Top points scorer: Justin van Staden (66)
- Top try scorers: Scott van Breda (4)

Other seasons
- Previous season: ← 2011
- Next season: 2013 →

In 2012, the Eastern Province Kings participated in the Currie Cup First Division and the Vodacom Cup. As part of the Southern Kings franchise, a number of players also participated in friendlies for this franchise.

== Chronological list of events ==
- 4 January 2012: Castres Olympique announce that they have signed winger Paul Perez as a medical joker on a six-month deal.
- 19 January 2012: Former captain and Springbok De Wet Barry announces his retirement from playing, but will stay on at the Kings as a defensive coach.
- 25 January 2012: Earl Rose joins the Kings on a trial basis. Zane Killian also joins the Kings on a short-term loan deal.
- 31 January 2012: Scrum-half Dustin Jinka also joins the Kings on a trial basis. All three trialists are named on the subs bench for the game against the Bulls.
- 6 February 2012: Paul Perez is denied a visa for his move to Castres Olympique.
- 21 February 2012: The Kings did not pursue their interest in any of the three trialists – Earl Rose, Zane Killian and Dustin Jinka – and they all leave the union.
- 6 March 2012: Two more players joined the Kings for a trial – former Lions prop Kevin Buys and Brian Skosana, who has been playing rugby league in Australia with the Sydney Roosters.
- 29 March 2012: Prop Wayne Swart joins the Kings until the end of the season.
- 12 April 2012: It is announced that Matt Sexton will join the Kings as head coach on 15 July, with Brad Mooar joining as a specialist skills coach.
- 16 April 2012: Boela Abrahams rejoins the Kings on a two-year deal following a short spell at Maties in the Varsity Cup.
- 17 April 2012: Prop Dexter Fahey is drafted into the Kings squad from university team NMMU Madibaz for their Vodacom Cup clash against Sharks XV.
- 15 May 2012: Fly-half Monty Dumond is released by the Kings.
- 29 May 2012: The Kings sign scrum-half Scott Mathie from the Sale Sharks.
- 5 June 2012: Former Eastern Province fly-half Wesley Dunlop rejoins the side from the Blue Bulls, while Boland Cavaliers prop Charl du Plessis is also training with the team. Winger Paul Perez makes his debut for Samoa in the 2012 IRB Pacific Nations Cup.
- 6 June 2012: Winger Michael Killian also announces that he is returning to the Kings for the 2012 Currie Cup First Division season.
- 16 June 2012: Prop Schalk Ferreira joins the Kings for 2 months on a trial basis.
- 26 June 2012: The squad for the 2012 Currie Cup First Division is released. Flanker Wimpie van der Walt is another new inclusion in the squad.
- 18 July 2012: Loose-forward Thabo Mamojele is included in a 25-man squad for the game against Border Bulldogs.
- 16 August 2012: Following the confirmation of the Southern Kings' participation in Super Rugby in 2013, the signing of fly-half Demetri Catrakilis for 2013 is confirmed.
- 5 September 2012: Lock Johan Snyman signs a contract with Welsh team Scarlets for the 2012–13 season.
- 7 September 2012: Border Bulldogs players Samora Fihlani and Ntabeni Dukisa (both on loan at the Griffons) sign contracts to join the Kings for the 2013 season.
- 12 September 2012: Lock Steven Sykes signed with the Kings for the 2013 Super Rugby season.
- 13 September 2012: Cheetahs centre Andries Strauss also signed a two-year contract with the Kings for 2013.
- 3 October 2012: The Kings announce an additional three signings for 2013 : Lions hooker Bandise Maku, Blues back Hadleigh Parkes and Toulouse and Argentina scrum-half Nicolás Vergallo.
- 10 October 2012: Hooker Frank Herne signed a deal to move to the Pumas.
- 13 October 2012: The Kings are crowned 2012 Currie Cup First Division champions, beating the Pumas 26 – 25 in the final.
- 26 October 2012: The Kings fail to win promotion to the 2013 Currie Cup Premier Division, losing their two-legged play-off to the Free State Cheetahs.
- 27 October 2012: Tiger Mangweni wins the EP Kings Player of the Year award at the Kings awards banquet in Port Elizabeth, as well as the Most Valuable Player award. Winger Paul Perez won the Media Player of the Year award and the Try of the Year award for his try against the Griffons. The Rookie of the Year award went to Cornell du Preez, the Under-21 Player of the Year award to Shane Gates and the Most Promising Player award went to Rynier Bernardo.
- 29 October 2012: Fly-half Louis Strydom joins the Griffons for 2013. Clint Newland and André Schlechter also leave the Kings.
- 30 October 2012: The on-loan signing of Pumas scrum-half Shaun Venter is also confirmed as he joined up with the team in Port Elizabeth, while Eusebio Guiñazú also joined the Kings.
- 5 November 2012: The Kings sign even more players, with front-rowers Ross Geldenhuys and Edgar Marutlulle (on loan the Leopards) signing up.
- 8 November 2012: The Kings will sign a second player on loan from the Leopards, Kenyan loose-forward Daniel Adongo.
- 13 November 2012: Former Cheetahs winger Jongi Nokwe is named in a Cheetahs extended playing squad in preparation for the 2013 Super Rugby season.
- 21 November 2012: Waylon Murray announced that he will be joining the Southern Kings for the 2013 Super Rugby season.
- 24 November 2012: A 51-man Southern Kings 2013 Super Rugby wider training squad is announced. Centre Ronnie Cooke is another new name included in the team. However, Eusebio Guiñazú is not included as he joined English team Bath instead.
- 26 November 2012: Hooker Bobby Dyer joins club team Despatch.
- 27 November 2012: Despite not being named in the initial training group, director of rugby Alan Solomons confirms that Kenyan loose-forward Daniel Adongo will also join up with the team.
- 11 December 2012: Anele Pamba resigns as Kings CEO and is replaced by Charl Crous on an interim basis.
- 17 December 2012: The Kings sign French hooker Virgile Lacombe.

== Players ==
=== Player movements ===
==== Before the 2012 Vodacom Cup season ====
Before the 2012 Vodacom Cup season
In/out	Position	Player name	From/to
In	PR	Dexter Fahey	NMMU Madibaz
In	PR	Lizo Gqoboka	Eastern Province Kings Academy
In	PR	Elrich Kock	Eastern Province Kings Academy
In	PR	Thabiso Mngomezulu	Eastern Province Kings Academy
In	PR	Brenden Olivier	Eastern Province Kings Academy
In	PR	Wayne Swart	Golden Lions
In	LK	Rynier Bernardo	Eastern Province Kings Academy
In	LK	David Bulbring	Golden Lions
In	LK	Johan Snyman	Golden Lions
In	FL	Thembelani Bholi	Eastern Province Kings Academy
In	N8	Cornell du Preez	Leopards
In	N8	Siya Mangaliso	Eastern Province Kings Academy
In	SH	Reynier van Rooyen	Eastern Province Kings Academy
In	FH	Shane Gates	Eastern Province Kings Academy
In	FH	Andile Witbooi	Eastern Province Kings Academy
In	CE	Steven Hansel	Eastern Province Kings Academy
In	WG	Kieran Goss	Sharks Academy
In	WG	Jongi Nokwe	Free State Cheetahs
In	FB	Scott van Breda	Eastern Province Kings Academy
In	FB	Justin van Staden	Pumas U21
Out	PR	Phumlani Nodikida	Released
Out	PR	Ronnie Uys	RC Narbonne
Out	PR	Riaan Vermeulen	Released
Out	HK	Jaco Fourie	Released
Out	LK	Nolan Clark	Boland Cavaliers
Out	LK	Rory Duncan	Retired
Out	LK	Ross Kennedy	Crusaders
Out	SH	Boela Abrahams	Maties
Out	SH	Jacques Coetzee	Griquas
Out	SH	Marlon Lewis	Despatch Rugby Club
Out	FH	Jaco van Schalkwyk	Despatch Rugby Club
Out	CE	De Wet Barry	Retired
Out	WG	Milo Nqoro	Released
Short-term deals
In/out	Position	Player name	From/to
In	PR	Kevin Buys	Golden Lions (trial)
In	PR	Zane Killian	Falcons (loan)
In	SH	Dustin Jinka	Blue Bulls (trial)
In	FH	Earl Rose	Griquas (trial)
In	CE	Brian Skosana	Sydney Roosters (trial)
Out	PR	Zane Killian	Falcons (loan finished)
Out	SH	Dustin Jinka	Released (trial finished)
Out	FH	Earl Rose	Released (trial finished)
Out	WG	Paul Perez	Samoa sevens team

==== Before the 2012 Currie Cup season ====
Before the 2012 Currie Cup season
In/out	Position	Player name	From/to
In	PR	Charl du Plessis	Boland Cavaliers
In	PR	Schalk Ferreira	Western Province
In	FL	Thabo Mamojele	Leopards
In	FL	Wimpie van der Walt	(Italy) San Gregorio
In	SH	Scott Mathie	(England) Sale Sharks
In	FH	Wesley Dunlop	Blue Bulls
In	WG	Michael Killian	Lions
In	WG	Siviwe Soyizwapi	Eastern Province Kings Academy
Out	FH	Monty Dumond	Despatch Rugby Club

==== After the 2012 Currie Cup season ====
After the 2012 Currie Cup season
In/out	Position	Player name	From/to
In	PR	Ross Geldenhuys	Free State Cheetahs
In	PR	Eusebio Guiñazú	(Wales) Toulouse
In	HK	Bandise Maku	Golden Lions
In	HK	Edgar Marutlulle	Leopards
In	LK	Samora Fihlani	Border Bulldogs
In	LK	Steven Sykes	Sharks
In	SH	Nicolás Vergallo	(Wales) Toulouse
In	SH	Shaun Venter	Pumas
In	FH	Demetri Catrakilis	Western Province
In	CE	Waylon Murray	Lions
In	CE	Andries Strauss	Cheetahs
In	FB	Ntabeni Dukisa	Border Bulldogs
In	FB	Hadleigh Parkes	(New Zealand) Blues
Out	PR	Clint Newland	Released
Out	PR	André Schlechter	Released
Out	HK	Frank Herne	Pumas
Out	LK	Johan Snyman	(Wales) Scarlets
Out	SH	Danie Faasen	UP Tuks
Out	FH	Louis Strydom	Griffons
Out	WG	Jongi Nokwe	Free State Cheetahs

=== Movement matrix ===
This is a list of transfers involving Eastern Province Kings players between the end of the 2011 Currie Cup First Division and the end of the 2012 Currie Cup First Division.

Players listed are all players that were included in a 22-man matchday squad at any during the season.

(did not play) denotes that a player did not play at all during one of the two seasons due to injury or non-selection. These players are included to indicate they remained attached to the team.

Players might be used in different positions, but will be listed in their most common positions during the two seasons.

Eastern Province Kings transfers 2011/12
Pos	2011 Currie Cup	Movements	2012 Vodacom Cup	Movements	2012 Currie Cup
PR	Jaco Engels; Sphephelo Mayaba (did not play); Thabiso Mngomezulu (did not play); Clint Newland; Phumlani Nodikida (did not play); André Schlechter; Ronnie Uys; Riaan Vermeulen	(substituted on) Kevin Buys (from Golden Lions); (substituted on) Dexter Fahey (from NMMU Madibaz); (substituted on) Lizo Gqoboka (from EP Kings Academy); (substituted on) Elrich Kock (from EP Kings Academy); (substituted on) Brenden Olivier (from EP Kings Academy); (substituted on) Wayne Swart (from Golden Lions); (substituted off) Phumlani Nodikida (released); (substituted off) Ronnie Uys (to (France) Narbonne); (substituted off) Riaan Vermeulen (released)	Kevin Buys; Jaco Engels; Dexter Fahey; Lizo Gqoboka; Elrich Kock; Sphephelo Mayaba (did not play); Thabiso Mngomezulu (did not play); Clint Newland; Brenden Olivier; André Schlechter; Wayne Swart	(substituted on) Charl du Plessis (from Boland Cavaliers); (substituted on) Schalk Ferreira (on trial from Western Province); (substituted off) Dexter Fahey (not included in squad); (substituted off) Elrich Kock (not included in squad); (substituted off) Sphephelo Mayaba (not included in squad); (substituted off) Thabiso Mngomezulu (not included in squad); (substituted off) Brenden Olivier (not included in squad)	Kevin Buys (did not play); Charl du Plessis; Jaco Engels; Schalk Ferreira (trial); Lizo Gqoboka; Clint Newland; André Schlechter; Wayne Swart (did not play)
HK	Bobby Dyer; Jaco Fourie (did not play); Hannes Franklin; Frank Herne	(substituted off) Jaco Fourie (released)	Bobby Dyer; Hannes Franklin; Frank Herne		Bobby Dyer; Hannes Franklin; Frank Herne
LK	Nolan Clark (did not play); Rory Duncan (did not play); Ross Kennedy; Darron Nell; Barend Pieterse; Wayne van Heerden	(substituted on) Rynier Bernardo (from EP Kings Academy); (substituted on) David Bulbring (from Golden Lions); (substituted on) Johan Snyman (from Golden Lions); (substituted off) Nolan Clark (to Boland Cavaliers); (substituted off) Rory Duncan (retired); (substituted off) Ross Kennedy (to (New Zealand) Crusaders)	Rynier Bernardo; David Bulbring; Darron Nell; Barend Pieterse (did not play); Johan Snyman; Wayne van Heerden		Rynier Bernardo; David Bulbring; Darron Nell; Barend Pieterse (did not play); Johan Snyman (did not play); Wayne van Heerden
FL	Boetie Britz; Mpho Mbiyozo; Devin Oosthuizen; Jacques Potgieter	(substituted on) Cornell du Preez (from Leopards); (substituted off) Jacques Potgieter (to Blue Bulls)	Boetie Britz; Cornell du Preez; Mpho Mbiyozo; Devin Oosthuizen	(substituted on) Thabo Mamojele (from Leopards); (substituted on) Wimpie van der Walt (from (Italy) San Gregorio)	Boetie Britz; Cornell du Preez; Thabo Mamojele; Mpho Mbiyozo; Devin Oosthuizen; Wimpie van der Walt
N8	Jacques Engelbrecht; Luke Watson	(substituted on) Thembelani Bholi (from EP Kings Academy)	Thembelani Bholi (did not play); Jacques Engelbrecht; Luke Watson (did not play)		Thembelani Bholi (did not play); Jacques Engelbrecht; Luke Watson
SH	Boela Abrahams; Jacques Coetzee; Danie Faasen; Marlon Lewis (did not play); Gerrie Odendaal (did not play); Falie Oelschig	(substituted on) Reynier van Rooyen (from EP Kings Academy); (substituted off) Jacques Coetzee (to Griquas); (substituted off) Marlon Lewis (released); (substituted off) Gerrie Odendaal (retired)	Boela Abrahams; Danie Faasen; Falie Oelschig; Reynier van Rooyen	(substituted on) Scott Mathie (from (England) Sale Sharks)	Boela Abrahams (did not play); Danie Faasen; Scott Mathie; Falie Oelschig; Reynier van Rooyen
FH	Monty Dumond (out on loan); Shane Gates (not in squad); Louis Strydom; Jaco van Schalkwyk; George Whitehead	(substituted on) Justin van Staden (from Pumas Academy); (substituted off) Jaco van Schalkwyk (released)	Monty Dumond; Shane Gates; Louis Strydom (did not play); Justin van Staden; George Whitehead (not in squad)	(substituted on) Wesley Dunlop (from Blue Bulls); (substituted off) Monty Dumond (released)	Wesley Dunlop; Shane Gates; Louis Strydom (did not play); Justin van Staden (did not play); George Whitehead
CE	De Wet Barry (did not play); Jaco Bekker; Siyanda Grey; Morgan Newman (loan); Wayne Stevens; Matthew Tayler-Smith	(substituted on) Steven Hansel (from EP Kings Academy); (substituted on) Foxy Ntleki (from EP Kings Academy); (substituted on) Scott van Breda (from EP Kings Academy); (substituted off) De Wet Barry (retired); (substituted off) Morgan Newman (loan finished)	Jaco Bekker (did not play); Siyanda Grey (did not play); Steven Hansel; Foxy Ntleki; Wayne Stevens; Matthew Tayler-Smith; Scott van Breda	(substituted off) Jaco Bekker (not included in squad); (substituted off) Steven Hansel (not included in squad)	Siyanda Grey; Foxy Ntleki; Wayne Stevens; Matthew Tayler-Smith (did not play); Scott van Breda
WG	Joe Breytenbach (trial); Norman Nelson; Milo Nqoro (did not play); Paul Perez (did not play); Marcello Sampson; Andile Witbooi	(substituted on) Jongi Nokwe (from Free State Cheetahs); (substituted off) Joe Breytenbach (trial finished); (substituted off) Milo Nqoro (released)	Norman Nelson; Jongi Nokwe; Paul Perez (not in squad); Marcello Sampson; Andile Witbooi	(substituted on) Michael Killian (from Lions)	Michael Killian; Norman Nelson; Jongi Nokwe; Paul Perez; Marcello Sampson; Siviwe Soyizwapi; Andile Witbooi (did not play)
FB	Tiger Mangweni; SP Marais; Mzwandile Stick	(substituted on) Kieran Goss (from Sharks Academy)	Kieran Goss; Tiger Mangweni; SP Marais; Mzwandile Stick (did not play)	(substituted off) Kieran Goss (not included in squad)	Tiger Mangweni; SP Marais; Mzwandile Stick (did not play)

== Vodacom Cup ==
=== Log ===
2012 Vodacom Cup Southern Section Table
Pos	Team	Pld	W	D	L	PF	PA	PD	TF	TA	TB	LB	Pts	Qualification
1	Western Province	7	7	0	0	220	130	+90	24	11	4	0	32	Qualified for the Quarter Finals
2	Sharks XV	7	5	0	2	223	138	+85	25	14	4	2	26	Qualified for the Quarter Finals
3	Eastern Province Kings	7	5	0	2	209	178	+31	21	17	3	1	24	Qualified for the Quarter Finals
4	Pampas XV	7	4	0	3	216	181	+35	23	20	3	2	21	Qualified for the Quarter Finals
5	Boland Cavaliers	7	4	0	3	217	225	−8	27	25	3	2	21	
6	Free State XV	7	2	0	5	211	259	−48	28	29	5	1	14	
7	Border Bulldogs	7	1	0	6	165	271	−106	17	38	2	1	7	
8	SWD Eagles	7	0	0	7	176	255	−79	23	34	3	3	6	

Rules for classification:
- 4 points for a win
- 2 points for a draw
- 1 bonus point for a loss by seven points or less
- 1 bonus point for scoring four or more tries in a match

=== Fixtures and results ===
9 March 2012	Pampas XV	26–34	Eastern Province Kings	A.F. Markötter Stadium, Stellenbosch
15:10	Try: Ramiro Moyano 2'; Lisandro Gomez Lopez 16'; Con: Santiago González Iglesias 3', 17' (2/2); Pen: Santiago González Iglesias 15', 24', 46', 69' (4/4); Cards: Nahuel Lobo (yellow card) 66' to 75'	Scoreboard	Try: Jacques Engelbrecht 20'; Shane Gates 39'; Boetie Britz 55', 67'; Con: Falie Oelschig 40' (1/4); Pen: Falie Oelschig 12', 30', 33', 48' (4/6); Scott van Breda (0/1)	Attendance: 500; Referee: Stuart Berry

16 March 2012	Eastern Province Kings	40–23	Border Bulldogs	Nelson Mandela Bay Stadium, Port Elizabeth
19:00	Try: Hannes Franklin 32'; Scott van Breda 36'; Danie Faasen 68'; Kieran Goss 76'; Con: Falie Oelschig 33', 37' (2/2); Justin van Staden 69', 77' (2/2); Pen: Falie Oelschig 10', 12' (2/3); Justin van Staden 60', 65' (2/3); Cards: Shane Gates (red card) 47'	Scoreboard	Try: Clinton Koen 71'; Con: Dale Sabbagh (0/1); Pen: Ntabeni Dukisa 16', 26', 34', 39', 47' (5/7); Logan Basson 28' (1/1)	Attendance: 2,000; Referee: Quinton Immelman

24 March 2012	Western Province	30–25	Eastern Province Kings	City Park Stadium, Athlone
16:00	Try: Ederies Arendse 14'; JP du Plessis 81'; Con: Demetri Catrakilis 82' (1/2); Pen: Demetri Catrakilis 30', 34', 58', 64', 68', 72' (6/7)	Scoreboard	Try: Andile Witbooi 5'; Scott van Breda 25'; Con: Justin van Staden (0/2); Pen: Justin van Staden 17', 22' (2/3); Scott van Breda 43', 50' (2/2); Drop: Justin van Staden 31' (1/2)	Referee: Pro Legoete

30 March 2012	Eastern Province Kings	36–22	Free State Cheetahs	Nelson Mandela Bay Stadium, Port Elizabeth
19:10	Try: Boetie Britz 19'; Andile Witbooi 27', 72'; Jacques Engelbrecht 39'; Con: Scott van Breda (0/2); Falie Oelschig 40', 73' (2/2); Pen: Scott van Breda 13', 36' (2/2); Falie Oelschig 46', 63' (2/2); Cards: Justin van Staden (yellow card) 76'	Scoreboard	Try: Philip Burger 9'; Marcel van der Merwe 59'; Elandré Huggett 77'; Con: Riaan Smit 10', 60' (2/3); Pen: Riaan Smit (0/1); Drop: Riaan Smit 16' (1/1); Cards: Armandt Koster (yellow card) 45' to 55'	Referee: Christie du Preez

13 April 2011	SWD Eagles	25–27	Eastern Province Kings	Outeniqua Park, George
19:00	Try: Kempie Rautenbach 10'; Mzo Dyantyi 54'; Clinton Wagman 75'; Con: Raynor Becker 11', 76' (2/3); Pen: Raynor Becker 16', 49' (2/5); Cecil Dumond (0/1)	Scoreboard	Try: Norman Nelson 44'; Frank Herne 79'; Con: Justin van Staden 45' (1/1); Falie Oelschig (0/1); Pen: Justin van Staden 7', 30', 35', 42', 57' (5/5); Drop: Shane Gates (0/1)

21 April 2011	Sharks XV	28–18	Eastern Province Kings	Kings Park Stadium, Durban
	Try: Tera Mtembu 4', 32'; Brynard Stander 18'; Con: Gouws Prinsloo 5', 19' (2/3); Pen: Gouws Prinsloo 70', 74', 81' (3/3); Cards: Cobus Reinach (yellow card) 36' to 47'	Scoreboard	Try: Scott van Breda 37'; Darron Nell 46'; Con: Justin van Staden 38' (1/1); Scott van Breda (0/1); Pen: Scott van Breda 43', 72' (2/3)

27 April 2012	Eastern Province Kings	29–24	Boland Cavaliers	Nelson Mandela Bay Stadium, Port Elizabeth
15:00	Try: Jongi Nokwe 12'; Scott van Breda 21'; Marcello Sampson 38'; Con: Justin van Staden 22' (1/3); Pen: Justin van Staden 5', 28', 30', 46' (4/4)	Scoreboard	Try: Siviwe Magaba 34'; Franzel September 42'; Johnathan Francke 77'; Con: Elgar Watts 35', 43', 78' (3/3); Pen: Elgar Watts 8' (1/4)	Referee: Rasta Rasivhenge

Quarter Final	4 May 2012	Pumas	30–19	Eastern Province Kings	Mbombela Stadium, Mbombela
	19:10	Try: Ashley Buys 2'; Torsten van Jaarsveld 12'; Jaco Bouwer 19'; Corné Fourie 49'; Con: JC Roos 3', 50' (2/4); Pen: JC Roos 44', 69' (2/2); Drop: JC Roos (0/1); Cards: Renaldo Bothma (yellow card) 38' to 48'	Scoreboard	Try: SP Marais 46'; Con: Justin van Staden 47' (1/1); Pen: Justin van Staden 9', 22', 39', 53' (4/8)	Referee: Rasta Rasivhenge

=== Player statistics ===
The following table shows players statistics for the 2012 Vodacom Cup season:

	Player Statistics – 2012 Vodacom Cup									
Player	Starts	Used Sub	Unused Sub	Points	Tries	Cons	Pens	DGs	YC	RC
Kevin Buys	0	2	0	0	0	0	0	0	0	0
Jaco Engels	3	0	0	0	0	0	0	0	0	0
Dexter Fahey	0	1	0	0	0	0	0	0	0	0
Lizo Gqoboka	1	2	0	0	0	0	0	0	0	0
Elrich Kock	4	2	0	0	0	0	0	0	0	0
Clint Newland	4	0	0	0	0	0	0	0	0	0
Brenden Olivier	2	0	0	0	0	0	0	0	0	0
André Schlechter	1	0	0	0	0	0	0	0	0	0
Wayne Swart	1	1	0	0	0	0	0	0	0	0
Bobby Dyer	0	0	1	0	0	0	0	0	0	0
Hannes Franklin	8	0	0	5	1	0	0	0	0	0
Frank Herne	0	7	0	5	1	0	0	0	0	0
Rynier Bernardo	2	2	1	0	0	0	0	0	0	0
David Bulbring	6	1	0	0	0	0	0	0	0	0
Darron Nell	7	0	0	5	1	0	0	0	0	0
Johan Snyman	1	3	0	0	0	0	0	0	0	0
Wayne van Heerden	0	1	0	0	0	0	0	0	0	0
Boetie Britz	7	0	0	15	3	0	0	0	0	0
Mpho Mbiyozo	7	0	0	0	0	0	0	0	0	0
Devin Oosthuizen	2	6	0	0	0	0	0	0	0	0
Cornell du Preez	0	2	0	0	0	0	0	0	0	0
Jacques Engelbrecht	8	0	0	10	2	0	0	0	0	0
Boela Abrahams	0	3	0	0	0	0	0	0	0	0
Danie Faasen	5	1	1	5	1	0	0	0	0	0
Falie Oelschig	3	2	0	34	0	5	8	0	0	0
Reynier van Rooyen	0	0	1	0	0	0	0	0	0	0
Shane Gates	4	1	0	5	1	0	0	0	0	1
Steven Hansel	0	0	1	0	0	0	0	0	0	0
Foxy Ntleki	0	0	1	0	0	0	0	0	0	0
Wayne Stevens	4	0	0	0	0	0	0	0	0	0
Matthew Tayler-Smith	0	3	2	0	0	0	0	0	0	0
Scott van Breda	8	0	0	38	4	0	6	0	0	0
Norman Nelson	3	0	0	5	1	0	0	0	0	0
Jongi Nokwe	2	0	0	5	1	0	0	0	0	0
Marcello Sampson	7	0	0	5	1	0	0	0	0	0
Andile Witbooi	4	0	0	15	3	0	0	0	0	0
Kieran Goss	4	2	0	5	1	0	0	0	0	0
Tiger Mangweni	4	2	0	0	0	0	0	0	0	0
SP Marais	3	1	0	5	1	0	0	0	0	0
Justin van Staden	5	2	1	66	0	6	17	1	1	0

- Jaco Bekker, Thembelani Bholi, Monty Dumond, Siyanda Grey, Sphephelo Mayaba, Thabiso Mngomezulu, Barend Pieterse, Mzwandile Stick, Louis Strydom and Luke Watson were named in the 2012 Vodacom Cup squad, but never included in a matchday 22.

== Currie Cup ==
=== Log ===
2012 Currie Cup First Division Table
Pos	Team	Pld	W	D	L	PF	PA	PD	TF	TA	TB	LB	Pts	Qualification
1	Eastern Province Kings (C)	14	12	2	0	515	246	+269	64	27	10	0	62	Promotion Play-Offs; Semi-finals
2	Pumas	14	9	2	3	525	365	+160	64	46	9	1	50	Semi-finals
3	Griffons	14	9	0	5	476	491	−15	65	70	10	2	48	Semi-finals
4	Leopards	14	8	0	6	511	449	+62	66	51	10	2	44	Semi-finals
5	SWD Eagles	14	8	1	5	473	445	+28	60	56	8	1	43	
6	Boland Cavaliers	14	3	2	9	466	487	−21	63	67	8	6	30	
7	Falcons	14	3	1	10	393	598	−205	56	82	7	2	23	
8	Border Bulldogs	14	0	0	14	315	593	−278	41	80	6	5	11	

Rules for classification: 4 points for a win; 2 points for a draw; 1 bonus point for a loss by seven points or less; 1 bonus point for scoring four or more tries in a match
(C) Champion

=== Fixtures and results ===
29 June 2012	Boland Cavaliers	20–25	Eastern Province Kings	Boland Stadium, Wellington
15:00	Try: Jacquin Jansen 19', 42'; Con: Elgar Watts 19', 43' (2/2); Pen: Elgar Watts 64' (1/1); Ricardo Croy 82' (1/1)	Scoreboard	Try: George Whitehead 12'; Cornell du Preez 32'; SP Marais 69'; Con: George Whitehead 13' (1/2); Wesley Dunlop 70' (1/1); Pen: George Whitehead 5' (1/3); Wesley Dunlop 78' (1/1); Drop: Wesley Dunlop (0/1)	Referee: Jason Jaftha

6 July 2012	Eastern Province Kings	38–15	SWD Eagles	Nelson Mandela Bay Stadium, Port Elizabeth
19:00	Try: Wimpie van der Walt 43'; SP Marais 45'; Cornell du Preez 51'; George Whitehead 64'; Con: George Whitehead 46', 52', 65' (3/4); Pen: George Whitehead 13', 17', 31', 40' (4/4)	Scoreboard	Try: Alshaun Bock 35'; Deroy Rhoode 73'; Con: Kurt Coleman 74' (1/2); Pen: Kurt Coleman 6' (1/2)	Referee: Rasta Rashivenga

14 July 2012	Falcons	20–37	Eastern Province Kings	Barnard Stadium, Kempton Park
15:00	Try: Reg Muller 40'; JW Bell 55'; Uzair Cassiem 63'; Con: Karlo Aspeling 64' (1/3); Pen: Karlo Aspeling 25' (1/2); Drop: Arno Poley (0/1); Cards: Hannes Ludik (yellow card) 17' to 28'	Scoreboard	Try: Michael Killian 18'; Clint Newland 28'; Jongi Nokwe 37'; Lizo Gqoboka 49'; Con: George Whitehead 19', 29', 38', 49' (4/4); Pen: George Whitehead 2' (1/1); Wesley Dunlop 71', 79' (2/2); Cards: Hannes Franklin (yellow card) 61' to 71'	Attendance: 300; Referee: Stuart Berry

20 July 2012	Eastern Province Kings	56–5	Border Bulldogs	Nelson Mandela Bay Stadium, Port Elizabeth
19:10	Try: Luke Watson 11', 47'; Wayne Stevens 22'; Wayne van Heerden 38', 58'; SP Marais 53'; Scott van Breda 61'; Penalty try 80'; Con: Wesley Dunlop 12', 23', 39', 48', 54', 59', 62' (7/7); George Whitehead 81' (1/1)	Scoreboard	Try: Gareth Krause 25'; Con: Ntabeni Dukisa (0/1)	Attendance: 3,000; Referee: Quinton Immelman

28 July 2012	Griffons	10–34	Eastern Province Kings	North West Stadium, Welkom
15:00	Try: Nicky Steyn 55'; Francois Uys 72'; Con: Reinhardt Erwee (0/2); Cards: Hansie Graaff (yellow card) 63' to 73'	Scoreboard	Try: Marcello Sampson 19'; Thabo Mamojele 22'; George Whitehead 30'; Tiger Mangweni 51'; Con: George Whitehead 20', 23', 31', 52' (4/4); Pen: George Whitehead 9', 41' (2/3)	Referee: Pro Legoete

3 August 2012	Pumas	30–30	Eastern Province Kings	Puma Stadium, Witbank
19:10	Try: Renaldo Bothma 51'; JW Jonker 59'; Tiaan Marx 80'; Con: JC Roos 52', 60', 81' (3/3); Pen: JC Roos 16', 28', 38' (3/3)	Scoreboard	Try: Marcello Sampson 7'; David Bulbring 34'; Hannes Franklin 43'; Con: George Whitehead 8', 35', 44' (3/3); Pen: George Whitehead 24', 49', 71' (3/5)	Referee: Jaco Peyper

10 August 2012	Eastern Province Kings	20–12	Leopards	Nelson Mandela Bay Stadium, Port Elizabeth
19:00	Try: Paul Perez 50'; Con: George Whitehead (0/1); Pen: George Whitehead 5', 28', 55' (3/4); Wesley Dunlop 65', 75' (2/2); Cards: Clint Newland (yellow card) 44' to 54'	Scoreboard	Pen: André Pretorius 19', 36', 44', 59' (4/6); Drop: André Pretorius (0/2)	Referee: Pro Legoete

17 August 2012	Eastern Province Kings	57–19	Boland Cavaliers	Nelson Mandela Bay Stadium, Port Elizabeth
19:00	Try: Luke Watson 8', 45'; Clint Newland 13'; Tiger Mangweni 21'; Wesley Dunlop 28'; SP Marais 32'; Cornell du Preez 60'; Wimpie van der Walt 78'; Con: Wesley Dunlop 9', 14', 29', 33', 46', 61' (6/7); George Whitehead 79' (1/1); Pen: Wesley Dunlop 40' (1/1)	Scoreboard	Try: PJ van Zyl 35'; Nolan Clark 50'; Senan van der Merwe 74'; Con: Jacquin Jansen 51' (1/2); Eric Zana 75' (1/1)	Attendance: 3,000; Referee: Jaco Peyper

24 August 2012	SWD Eagles	7–29	Eastern Province Kings	Outeniqua Park, George
19:10	Try: Lyndon Hartnick 63'; Con: Elric van Vuuren 64' (1/1); Pen: Theuns Kotzé (0/1); Drop: Theuns Kotzé (0/1); Cards: Clinton Wagman (yellow card) 10' to 20'	Scoreboard	Try: Norman Nelson 16'; Wesley Dunlop 34'; Wayne Stevens 49'; Clint Newland 56'; Con: Wesley Dunlop 35', 50', 57' (3/4); Pen: Wesley Dunlop 43' (1/2); George Whitehead (0/1)	Attendance: 2,000; Referee: Quinton Immelman

31 August 2012	Eastern Province Kings	45–24	Falcons	Nelson Mandela Bay Stadium, Port Elizabeth
19:00	Try: Luke Watson 8', 15' penalty try 25'; Cornell du Preez 61', 66'; Jaco Engels 73'; Wayne Stevens 78'; Con: George Whitehead 9', 26' (2/3); Wesley Dunlop 62', 67', 74' (3/4)	Scoreboard	Try: Jaco Oosthuizen 12'; Reg Muller 27'; Con: Karlo Aspeling 13' (1/2); Pen: Karlo Aspeling 20', 41', 47' (3/3); Drop: Karlo Aspeling 44' (1/1)	Attendance: 1,000; Referee: Stuart Berry

7 September 2012	Border Bulldogs	19–35	Eastern Province Kings	Buffalo City Stadium, East London
19:10	Try: Theunis Lambrechts 74'; Con: Jannie Myburgh 75' (1/1); Pen: Reinhardt Gerber 6', 36' (2/3); Jannie Myburgh 56', 62' (2/2)	Scoreboard	Try: Cornell du Preez 31', 45', 59'; Tiger Mangweni 67'; Con: Wesley Dunlop 32', 46', 68' (3/4); Pen: Wesley Dunlop 16', 41', 50' (3/3)	Attendance: 500; Referee: Rasta Rasivhenge

14 September 2012	Eastern Province Kings	60–19	Griffons	Nelson Mandela Bay Stadium, Port Elizabeth
19:00	Try: Paul Perez 11'; SP Marais 14'; Cornell du Preez 25'; Luke Watson 37', 61', 66'; George Whitehead 47'; Tiger Mangweni 55'; Siyanda Grey 69'; Con: George Whitehead 12', 26', 38', 48', 56', 62' (6/9); Pen: George Whitehead 4' (1/1); Drop: George Whitehead (0/1); Cards: Falie Oelschig (yellow card) 31' to 41'	Scoreboard	Try: Hannes Snyman 44'; Cameron Jacobs 50'; Nicky Steyn 79'; Con: Hansie Graaff 50', 80' (2/3)	Referee: Ben Crouse

21 September 2012	Eastern Province Kings	26–26	Pumas	Nelson Mandela Bay Stadium, Port Elizabeth
19:10	Try: Marcello Sampson 9'; Tiger Mangweni 56'; Luke Watson 73', 78'; Con: George Whitehead 57', 74', 79' (3/4); Cards: Paul Perez (red card) 26'; David Bulbring (yellow card) 31' to 44'	Scoreboard	Try: JW Jonker 4'; Coenie van Wyk 43'; Con: JC Roos 5', 44' (2/2); Pen: JC Roos 13', 17', 19', 54' (4/4); Cards: Jaco Bouwer (yellow card) 66' to '	Referee: Quinton Immelman

28 September 2012	Leopards	20–23	Eastern Province Kings	Olën Park, Potchefstroom
19:00	Try: Edgar Marutlulle 24' penalty try 66'; Con: André Pretorius 25', 66' (2/2); Pen: André Pretorius 20', 36' (2/3)	Scoreboard	Try: Wesley Dunlop 33'; Wimpie van der Walt 47'; Con: Wesley Dunlop 34', 48' (2/2); Pen: Wesley Dunlop 28', 32', 42' (3/4); Cards: Darron Nell (yellow card) 66' to 76'	Attendance: 500; Referee: Tiaan Jonker

Semi-Final	5 October 2012	Eastern Province Kings	50–27	Leopards	Nelson Mandela Bay Stadium, Port Elizabeth
	19:10	Try: Paul Perez 7', 38', 67'; Luke Watson 17'; Schalk Ferreira 46'; Marcello Sampson 71'; SP Marais 80'; Con: George Whitehead 18', 47' (2/6); Wesley Dunlop 81' (1/1); Pen: George Whitehead 5', 61' (2/2); Wesley Dunlop 79' (1/1)	Scoreboard	Try: BG Uys 30'; Edgar Marutlulle 44'; Allister Kettledas 75'; Con: André Pretorius 31', 45', 76' (3/3); Pen: André Pretorius 49' (1/2); Drop: André Pretorius 22' (1/1)	Referee: Rasta Rasivhenge

Final	13 October 2012	Eastern Province Kings	26–25	Pumas	Nelson Mandela Bay Stadium, Port Elizabeth
	14:30	Try: Darron Nell 38'; Marcello Sampson 67'; Con: George Whitehead 39' (1/1); Wesley Dunlop 68' (1/1); Pen: George Whitehead 5', 43', 49' (3/4); Wesley Dunlop 75' (1/1)	Scoreboard"	Try: RW Kember 16'; Coenie van Wyk 23', 79'; Jaco Bouwer 72'; Con: JC Roos (0/2); Naas Olivier 79' (1/2); Pen: JC Roos 2' (1/3); Drop: JC Roos (0/1)	Referee: Jason Jaftha

Promotion Play-Off	19 October 2012	Free State Cheetahs	53–14	Eastern Province Kings	Free State Stadium, Bloemfontein
	19:10	Try: Nico Scheepers 5'; Ross Geldenhuys 12'; Philip van der Walt 26'; Andries Strauss 30', 50'; Adriaan Strauss 56'; Rayno Benjamin 66' penalty try 75'; Con: Nico Scheepers 27', 31' (2/4); Sias Ebersohn (0/1); Tewis de Bruyn 57', 67', 76' (3/3); Pen: Tewis de Bruyn 62' (1/1)	Scoreboard	Try: Devin Oosthuizen 47'; Shane Gates 54'; Con: George Whitehead 47', 55' (2/2); Cards: Charl du Plessis (yellow card) 75' to 80'	Referee: Jonathan Kaplan

Promotion Play-Off	26 October 2012	Eastern Province Kings	6–16	Free State Cheetahs	Nelson Mandela Bay Stadium, Port Elizabeth
	19:00	Pen: George Whitehead 5', 12' (2/2); Cards: Falie Oelschig (red card) 32'	Scoreboard	Try: Sias Ebersohn 63'; Con: Nico Scheepers 64' (1/1); Pen: Sias Ebersohn (0/2); Nico Scheepers 62', 72', 78' (3/3)	Referee: Craig Joubert

=== Player statistics ===
The following table shows players statistics for the 2012 Currie Cup First Division season (including promotion/relegation games):

Player Statistics – 2012 Currie Cup First Division
Player	Starts	Used Sub	Unused Sub	Points	Tries	Cons	Pens	DGs	YC	RC
Charl du Plessis	1	10	0	0	0	0	0	0	1	0
Jaco Engels	7	0	0	5	1	0	0	0	0	0
Schalk Ferreira	11	0	0	5	1	0	0	0	0	0
Lizo Gqoboka	1	5	0	5	1	0	0	0	0	0
Clint Newland	13	0	0	15	3	0	0	0	1	0
André Schlechter	3	5	0	0	0	0	0	0	0	0
Bobby Dyer	1	2	0	0	0	0	0	0	0	0
Hannes Franklin	16	1	0	5	1	0	0	0	1	0
Frank Herne	1	14	1	0	0	0	0	0	0	0
Rynier Bernardo	4	5	1	0	0	0	0	0	0	0
David Bulbring	16	0	0	5	1	0	0	0	1	0
Darron Nell	11	2	0	5	1	0	0	0	1	0
Wayne van Heerden	5	10	3	10	2	0	0	0	0	0
Boetie Britz	1	1	0	0	0	0	0	0	0	0
Thabo Mamojele	4	1	0	5	1	0	0	0	0	0
Mpho Mbiyozo	3	9	0	0	0	0	0	0	0	0
Devin Oosthuizen	7	1	0	5	1	0	0	0	0	0
Wimpie van der Walt	14	3	0	15	3	0	0	0	0	0
Luke Watson	7	0	0	60	12	0	0	0	0	0
Cornell du Preez	16	0	0	45	9	0	0	0	0	0
Jacques Engelbrecht	2	0	0	0	0	0	0	0	0	0
Danie Faasen	2	3	0	0	0	0	0	0	0	0
Scott Mathie	3	7	0	0	0	0	0	0	0	0
Falie Oelschig	11	5	0	0	0	0	0	0	1	1
Reynier van Rooyen	2	3	1	0	0	0	0	0	0	0
Wesley Dunlop	6	11	1	114	3	27	15	0	0	0
George Whitehead	12	5	0	152	4	33	22	0	0	0
Shane Gates	1	0	0	5	1	0	0	0	0	0
Siyanda Grey	1	4	0	5	1	0	0	0	0	0
Tiger Mangweni	15	1	0	25	5	0	0	0	0	0
Foxy Ntleki	0	1	0	0	0	0	0	0	0	0
Wayne Stevens	14	2	0	15	3	0	0	0	0	0
Scott van Breda	4	7	0	5	1	0	0	0	0	0
Michael Killian	10	0	1	5	1	0	0	0	0	0
Norman Nelson	3	0	0	5	1	0	0	0	0	0
Jongi Nokwe	3	0	0	5	1	0	0	0	0	0
Paul Perez	11	0	0	25	5	0	0	0	0	1
Marcello Sampson	11	0	0	25	5	0	0	0	0	0
Siviwe Soyizwapi	1	0	0	0	0	0	0	0	0	0
SP Marais	16	0	0	30	6	0	0	0	0	0
Penalty try	–	–	–	10	2	–	–	–	–	–

- Boela Abrahams, Thembelani Bholi, Kevin Buys, Barend Pieterse, Johan Snyman, Mzwandile Stick, Louis Strydom, Wayne Swart, Matthew Tayler-Smith, Justin van Staden and Andile Witbooi were named in the 2012 Currie Cup First Division squad, but never included in a matchday 22.

== Other ==
In addition to the Currie Cup and Vodacom Cup, the Eastern Province Kings also played one first class match against a South African Students side:

19 June 2012	Eastern Province Kings	36–19	South African Students	Nelson Mandela Bay Stadium, Port Elizabeth
19:00	Try: Marcello Sampson; Jongi Nokwe; George Whitehead; Cornell du Preez; Con: George Whitehead; Wesley Dunlop; Pen: Wesley Dunlop	Scoreboard	Try: Joe Seerane; François du Toit penalty try Con: André Kemp; François du Toit

The following players appeared in the match:

2012 Eastern Province Kings side v South African Students
Forwards	Boetie Britz • David Bulbring • Cornell du Preez • Jacques Engelbrecht • Schalk Ferreira • Hannes Franklin • Frank Herne • Darron Nell • Clint Newland • Devin Oosthuizen • André Schlechter • Wayne van Heerden
Backs	Boela Abrahams • Wesley Dunlop • Tiger Mangweni • SP Marais • Jongi Nokwe • Foxy Ntleki • Falie Oelschig • Marcello Sampson • Scott van Breda • George Whitehead
Coach	Alan Solomons

== Under-21 Provincial Championship ==
=== Log ===
2012 Under-21 Provincial Championship Division A table
Pos	Team	Pld	W	D	L	PF	PA	PD	TF	TA	TB	LB	Pts	Qualification
1	Blue Bulls	12	10	0	2	445	274	+171	51	30	8	2	50	Semi-finals
2	Sharks	12	9	0	3	376	302	+74	36	34	5	1	42	Semi-finals
3	Western Province	12	8	0	4	376	308	+68	49	36	7	2	41	Semi-finals
4	Free State Cheetahs	12	4	1	7	333	355	−22	42	37	7	3	28	Semi-finals
5	Golden Lions	12	4	1	7	352	324	+28	41	37	4	5	27	
6	Leopards	12	4	0	8	323	397	−74	42	50	7	4	27	
7	Border Bulldogs	12	2	0	10	250	495	−245	29	66	1	0	9	Relegation play-off

Rules for classification: 4 points for a win; 2 points for a draw; 1 bonus point for a loss by seven points or less; 1 bonus point for scoring four or more tries in a match.

2012 Under-21 Provincial Championship Division B table
Pos	Team	Pld	W	D	L	PF	PA	PD	TF	TA	TB	LB	Pts	Qualification
1	Eastern Province Kings	6	6	0	0	295	76	+219	40	8	5	0	29	Semi-Finals
2	SWD Eagles	6	4	0	2	179	123	+56	19	13	3	1	20	Semi-Finals
3	Pumas	6	3	1	2	143	171	−28	19	21	3	1	18	Semi-Finals
4	Griquas	6	3	0	3	154	140	+14	20	13	3	2	17	Semi-Finals
5	Falcons	6	3	1	2	157	195	−38	19	28	3	0	17	
6	Boland Cavaliers	6	1	0	5	111	194	−83	12	26	2	2	8	
7	Griffons	6	0	0	6	123	263	−140	17	37	2	2	4	

Rules for classification: 4 points for a win; 2 points for a draw; 1 bonus point for a loss by seven points or less; 1 bonus point for scoring four or more tries in a match.
The title play-off winner play in a promotion play-off game.

=== Fixtures and results ===
17 August 2012	Eastern Province Kings	61–10	Boland Cavaliers	Nelson Mandela Bay Stadium, Port Elizabeth
16:30	Try: Kayle van Zyl 7', 10', 25', 74'; Renier Erasmus 17'; Siviwe Soyizwapi 33'; Foxy Ntleki 38'; Eben Barnard 42'; Shane Gates 60'; Con: Kayle van Zyl 8', 11', 18', 26', 34', 43', 61', 75' (8/9)	Scoreboard	Try: Marco Mongia 68'; Con: Marco Mongia 69' (1/1); Pen: Hagen Mumba 29' (1/2)	Referee: Quinton Immelman

24 August 2012	SWD Eagles	22–31	Eastern Province Kings	Outeniqua Park, George
17:05	Try: Marno Vorster 27'; Con: Franco Geldenhuys 29' (1/1); Pen: Chris Willemse 2', 23' (2/3); Franco Geldenhuys 35', 39', 76' (3/3); Cards: Shadrack Ronaldo Classsen (yellow card) 45' to 57'	Scoreboard	Try: Kayle van Zyl 11'; Renier Erasmus 46'; Shane Gates 59'; Con: Kayle van Zyl 12', 60' (2/3); Pen: Kayle van Zyl 4', 19', 33', 79' (4/5)	Referee: Daniel Fortuin

1 September 2012	Falcons	14–46	Eastern Province Kings	John Vorster Stadium, Nigel
15:00	Try: Fredericque Arafaat Kock 33'; Morné du Plessis 73'; Con: André Smit 34' (1/1); Rudolph Hendrik Smit 74' (1/1); Pen: André Smit (0/2)	Scoreboard	Try: Renier Erasmus 14'; Siviwe Soyizwapi 30'; Paul Schoeman 36'; Kayle van Zyl 53'; Yamkela Ngam 67'; Thabo Sisusa 77'; Shane Gates 79'; Con: Kayle van Zyl 31' (1/4); Steven Hansel 68', 78', 80' (3/3); Pen: Kayle van Zyl 42' (1/1)	Referee: Renier Vermeulen

14 September 2012	Eastern Province Kings	73–3	Griffons	Nelson Mandela Bay Stadium, Port Elizabeth
16:30	Try: Renier Erasmus 8', 45'; Brian Skosana 19'; Scott van Breda 25', 66'; Yamkela Ngam 37', 48', 74'; Thabo Sisusa 59'; Kuhle Sonkosi 62'; Foxy Ntleki 78'; Con: Scott van Breda 20', 26', 38', 46', 49', 60', 63', 67', 74' (9/10); Dwayne Kelly (0/1)	Scoreboard	Pen: Josua Francois de Lange 5' (1/1); Cards: Bruce Peter Scott (yellow card) 71'	Referee: Gerrie de Bruin

21 September 2012	Eastern Province Kings	43–3	Pumas	Nelson Mandela Bay Stadium, Port Elizabeth
17:05	Try: Kieran Goss 25'; Brian Skosana 28', 35', 69'; Scott van Breda 73', 79'; Con: Scott van Breda 36', 80' (2/6); Pen: Scott van Breda 12', 19', 40' (3/3)	Scoreboard	Pen: Cornelius Rautenbach 44' (1/3); Cards: Ivan George Hill (yellow card) 21' to 31'; Wayne Short (yellow card) 39' to 49'	Referee: François Groenewald

29 September 2012	Griquas	31–43	Eastern Province Kings	Griqua Park, Kimberley
15:30	Try: Werner Badenhorst 23', 35', 38', 49'; Johan van der Merwe 79'; Con: Zandré Swartz 39' (1/3); Hendrik Johan Naudé van Biljon 50', 80' (2/2); Pen: Andries Stefanus Johannes de Wet (0/1); Hendrik Johan Naudé van Biljon (0/1); Cards: SP Wessels (yellow card) 32' to 42'	Scoreboard	Try: Scott van Breda 8', 47'; Yamkela Ngam 66'; Shane Gates 70'; Con: Scott van Breda 9', 48', 67', 71' (4/4); Pen: Scott van Breda 3', 15', 29', 34', 43' (5/7)	Referee: Daniel Fortuin

Semi-Final	5 October 2012	Eastern Province Kings	67–5	Griquas	Nelson Mandela Bay Stadium, Port Elizabeth
	16:30	Try: Wayven Smith 13'; Siviwe Soyizwapi 20', 42'; Louis Fourie 22'; Yamkela Ngam 26'; Dwayne Kelly 34'; Dane van der Westhuyzen 53'; Sinethemba Ndita 62'; Brenden Olivier 70'; Paul Schoeman 77'; Con: Dwayne Kelly 14', 21', 35', 43', 54' (5/7); Kayle van Zyl 71', 78' (2/3); Pen: Dwayne Kelly 2' (1/3)	Scoreboard	Try: Mandla Richard Gum 38'; Con: Andries Stefanus Johannes de Wet (0/1); Cards: Heindrich Johannes Momberg (yellow card) 54' to 64'; SP Wessels (red card) 74'	Referee: Stephan Geldenhuys

Final	13 October 2012	Eastern Province Kings	24–10	SWD Eagles	Nelson Mandela Bay Stadium, Port Elizabeth
	12:00		Scoreboard		Referee: Daniel Fortuin

Promotion Play-Off	19 October 2012	Border Bulldogs	21–15	Eastern Province Kings	Buffalo City Stadium, East London
	17:00	Try: Wayne Lemley 2'; Stephan Kekana 13'; Dale Sabbagh 46'; Con: Dale Sabbagh 3', 14', 47' (3/3); Pen: Dale Sabbagh (0/1); Cards: Stephan Deysel (yellow card) 31' to 42'	Scoreboard	Pen: Scott van Breda 18', 34', 42', 58', 68' (5/6)	Referee: Quinton Immelman

=== Players ===
The following players played during the 2012 Under-21 Provincial Championship Division B season:

2012 Eastern Province Kings Under-21 Provincial Championship squad
Forwards	Michael Aristidou • Chad Banfield • Rynier Bernardo • Joel Erasmus • Renier Erasmus • Zolani Faku • Louis Fourie • Emile John Klassen • Elrich Kock • Heinrich Leonard • Chad Matthews • Sinethemba Ndita • Brenden Olivier • Ruan Roberts • Paul Schoeman • Elandré Smit • Wayven Smith • Vukile Sofisa • Kuhle Sonkosi • Dane van der Westhuyzen • Did not play: • Darryl-Owen Bowles • Marzuq Maarman
Backs	Eben Barnard • Ofentse Boloko • Shane Gates • Kieran Goss • Steven Hansel • Dwayne Kelly • Devon McDonald • Yamkela Ngam • Foxy Ntleki • Thabo Sisusa • Brian Skosana • Siviwe Soyizwapi • Scott van Breda • Marlou van Niekerk • Kayle van Zyl • Did not play: • Glenwill Lewis • Billy van Lill
Coach	Robbi Kempson

== Under-19 Provincial Championship ==
=== Log ===
2012 Under-19 Provincial Championship Division B table
Pos	Team	Pld	W	D	L	PF	PA	PD	TF	TA	TB	LB	Pts	Qualification
1	Eastern Province Kings	6	5	0	1	194	120	+74	29	15	5	0	25	Semi-finals
2	Border Bulldogs	6	4	0	2	225	151	+74	31	19	5	1	22	Semi-finals
3	Falcons	6	4	0	2	191	165	+26	25	21	4	1	21	Semi-finals
4	Griquas	6	4	0	2	163	183	−20	17	26	2	0	18	Semi-finals
5	Griffons	6	3	0	3	163	175	−12	21	25	4	1	17	
6	Pumas	6	1	0	5	105	193	−88	16	24	1	2	7	
7	Boland Cavaliers	6	0	0	6	115	169	−54	16	25	1	2	3	

Rules for classification: 4 points for a win; 2 points for a draw; 1 bonus point for a loss by seven points or less; 1 bonus point for scoring four or more tries in a match.
The title play-off winner play in a promotion play-off game.

=== Fixtures and results ===
17 August 2012	Eastern Province Kings	25–21	Boland Cavaliers	Nelson Mandela Bay Stadium, Port Elizabeth
14:45	Try: Marius le Roux 18'; Conrad du Toit 25', 41'; Sonwabo Majola 51'; Arnold Klein 64'; Con: Marlou van Niekerk (0/3); Conrad du Toit (0/2); Pen: Marlou van Niekerk (0/1); Cards: Matthew Moore (yellow card) 23' to 33'	Scoreboard	Try: Ryno Conradie 4', 60'; Nicolin Carelse 8'; Con: Riaan van Zyl 5', 9', 61' (3/3); Cards: Johannes Petrus Slabber (yellow card) 15' to 26'	Referee: Francois Pretorius

25 August 2012	Border Bulldogs	37–12	Eastern Province Kings	Buffalo City Stadium, East London
15:00	Try: Lukhanyo Am 13'; Riaan Herman Naudé 18'; Johan Paul Wagenaar 42'; Riaan Matthee 64'; Pieter Nel 65'; Con: Janco Truter Lehmann 14', 19', 66' (3/5); Pen: Janco Truter Lehmann 26' (1/1); Cards: Riaan Herman Naudé (yellow card) 52' to 63'	Scoreboard	Try: Stephan Zaayman 34'; Arnold Klein 68'; Con: Marlou van Niekerk 69' (1/2); Cards: Marlou van Niekerk (yellow card) 47' to 58'	Referee: Dilbert November

1 September 2012	Falcons	24–43	Eastern Province Kings	John Vorster Stadium, Nigel
13:30	Try: Adriaan van der Nest 54'; Estehan Visagie 71'; Con: Tiaan Bronkhorst (0/1); Adriaan van der Nest 71' (1/1); Pen: Tiaan Bronkhorst 1', 7', 28', 44' (4/5)	Scoreboard	Try: Sonwabo Majola 17'; Brendan Hector 19'; Lihleli Xoli 22', 62'; Marlou van Niekerk 58'; Bart le Roux 67'; Con: Marlou van Niekerk 17', 19', 22', 58', 68' (5/6); Pen: Marlou van Niekerk 5' (1/1); Cards: Marius le Roux (yellow card) 34' to 44'; Brendan Hector (yellow card) 74'	Referee: Tahla Ntshakaza

14 September 2012	Eastern Province Kings	33–13	Griffons	Nelson Mandela Bay Stadium, Port Elizabeth
15:00	Try: Marlou van Niekerk 3'; Lisa Banzi 7'; Lihleli Xoli 28'; Bennie Kitching 45'; Sonwabo Majola 63'; Con: Lihleli Xoli (0/1); Marlou van Niekerk 8', 29', 46', 64' (4/4); Drop: Marlou van Niekerk (0/1)	Scoreboard	Try: Dillon Jimmy Afrika 17'; Con: Brenvin Bradley Marais 18' (1/1); Pen: Brenvin Bradley Marais 30', 40' (2/2); Cards: Jonick Schoeman (yellow card) 61'	Referee: Dilbert November

21 September 2012	Eastern Province Kings	50–15	Pumas	Nelson Mandela Bay Stadium, Port Elizabeth
14:45	Try: Jaco Bernardo 10', 12'; Lisa Banzi 14', 16'; Sonwabo Majola 23'; Bennie Kitching 45'; Marlou van Niekerk 53'; Con: Marlou van Niekerk 11', 13', 15', 17', 24', 54' (6/7); Pen: Marlou van Niekerk 65' (1/1)	Scoreboard	Try: Joshua Elly Broomberg 20', 33', 49'; Con: Sheldon Marius van der Berg (0/1); Jason Roux (0/1); Marchand Greyvenstein (0/1); Drop: Sheldon Marius van der Berg (0/1)	Referee: Oregopotse Rametsi

29 September 2012	Griquas	10–31	Eastern Province Kings	Griqua Park, Kimberley
14:00	Try: Pieter Ernst Scholtz 61'; Con: André Gerhard Roberts 62' (1/1); Pen: André Gerhard Roberts 3' (1/3); Cards: Dries van der Westhuizen (yellow card) 34' to 46'	Scoreboard	Try: Neo Mehlwana 24'; Siyabonga Moabi 40'; Matthew Moore 47'; Sonwabo Majola 51'; Con: Alex Banfield 25', 41', 52' (3/3); Lisa Banzi 48' (1/1); Pen: Alex Banfield 35' (1/2); Cards: Armand van Rooyen (yellow card) 34' to 46'	Referee: Stephan Geldenhuys

Semi-Final	5 October 2012	Eastern Province Kings	27–16	Griquas	Nelson Mandela Bay Stadium, Port Elizabeth
	14:30	Try: Lisa Banzi 40'; Bart le Roux 46'; Aidon Davis 60'; Brendan Hector 62'; Con: Alex Banfield 47', 61' (2/4); Pen: Alex Banfield 55' (1/3); Cards: Bart le Roux (red card) 64'	Scoreboard	Try: Kevin Pretorius 28'; Curtley Duwayne Kiewiet 69'; Con: André Gerhard Roberts (0/2); Pen: André Gerhard Roberts 33', 53' (2/4); Cards: Mualaba Mukendi (yellow card) 64'	Referee: Ricus van der Hoven

Final	13 October 2012	Eastern Province Kings	17–34	Border Bulldogs	Nelson Mandela Bay Stadium, Port Elizabeth
	10:00	Try: Marlou van Niekerk 5'; Aidon Davis 57'; Con: Marlou van Niekerk 6', 58' (2/2); Pen: Marlou van Niekerk 43' (1/1); Cards: Lihleli Xoli (yellow card) 35' to 45'	Scoreboard	Try: Angus Cleophas 29', 66'; Aubrey Faul 50'; Con: Janco Truter Lehmann 30', 67' (2/3); Pen: Janco Truter Lehmann 24', 26', 45', 47', 68' (5/5)	Referee: Jaco Kotze

=== Players ===
The following players played during the 2012 Under-19 Provincial Championship Division B season:

2012 Eastern Province Kings Under-19 Provincial Championship squad
Forwards	Aidon Davis • Christo de Villiers • Armand du Preez • Ivan-John du Preez • Brendan Hector • Bennie Kitching • Arnold Klein • Luxolo Koza • Bart le Roux • Marius le Roux • Lyle Lombard • Bantu Mene • Matthew Moore • Msimelelo Innocent Mrwebi • Madlenkosi Sam • Arno Stander • Didier Tisson • Armand van Rooyen • Corrie van Zyl • Chadley Wenn • Stephan Zaayman • Did not play: • Jonathan Ford • Frans Antonie Gerber
Backs	Alex Banfield • Lisa Banzi • Jaco Bernardo • Andrew Peter Burkett • Kirwan Caesar • Conrad du Toit • Leandré Ebersöhn • Ayanda Hanabe • Xavier Isaacs • Enrico Koester • Sonwabo Majola • Neo Mehlwana • Siyabonga Moabi • Zuko Ndlela • Sergeal Petersen • JC Pittaway • Sinethemba Skelem • Marlou van Niekerk • Lihleli Xoli • Did not play: • Danie le Roux
Coach	Ryan Felix

== Southern Kings ==
=== Fixtures and results ===
The Southern Kings played in several pre-season friendlies against other Super Rugby franchises.

28 January 2012	Southern Kings	20–33	Cheetahs	Buffalo City Stadium, East London
17:00	Try: Vuyo Mbotho; Con: Elric van Vuuren; Pen: Elric van Vuuren; Cards: Ntando Kebe (yellow card); Frans Laatz (yellow card); Marius Visser (yellow card); Johan Herbst (yellow card)	Report	Try: Rocco Jansen; Dusty Noble; Piet van Zyl; Sias Ebersohn; Willie le Roux; Con: Johan Goosen; Sias Ebersohn	Referee: Joey Salmans

4 February 2012	Southern Kings	12–16	Bulls	Nelson Mandela Bay Stadium, Port Elizabeth
17:30	Try: Mzwandile Stick; Luke Watson; Con: Louis Strydom; Cards: Jean Cook; Sampie Mastriet	Report	Pen: Louis Fouché; Drop: Louis Fouché; Cards: Jean Cook (yellow card)	Referee: Stuart Berry

11 February 2012	Southern Kings	13–38	Stormers	Nelson Mandela Bay Stadium, Port Elizabeth
17:00	Try: Norman Nelson; Con: Falie Oelschig; Pen: Falie Oelschig	Report	Try: Joe Pietersen; Jean de Villiers; Gio Aplon; Nick Köster; Siya Kolisi; Burton Francis; Con: Gary van Aswegen; Joe Pietersen	Referee: Lourens van der Merwe

14 February 2012	Southern Kings	0–88	Lions	Outeniqua Park, George
18:30		Report	Try: Derick Minnie; Deon van Rensburg; Cobus Grobbelaar; Elton Jantjies; Callie Visagie; Pat Cilliers; Hendrik Roodt; James Kamana penalty try Con: Elton Jantjies	Referee: Marius Jonker

17 February 2012	Southern Kings	13–38	Sharks	Nelson Mandela Bay Stadium, Port Elizabeth
19:00	Try: Boetie Britz; Con: Earl Rose; Pen: Falie Oelschig		Try: Odwa Ndungane; Ryan Kankowski; Riaan Viljoen; Keegan Daniel; Paul Jordaan; Con: Patrick Lambie; Cards: Keegan Daniel (yellow card)	Referee: Jonathan Kaplan

== Awards ==
=== SARU Awards ===
The Kings received the following nominations for the SARU awards:

Award	Nominee	Result
Team of the Year	Eastern Province Kings	Nominated
Coach of the Year	Alan Solomons	Nominated
Currie Cup First Division Player of the Year	Paul Perez	Nominated
Currie Cup First Division Player of the Year	Luke Watson	Nominated

=== EP Kings Awards ===
The following awards were given to players for the 2012 season:

Award	Player
Player of the Year	Tiger Mangweni
Media Player of the Year	Paul Perez
Most Valuable Player	Tiger Mangweni
Try of the Year	Paul Perez (v Griffons)
Rookie of the Year	Cornell du Preez
Most Promising Player	Rynier Bernardo
U21 Player of the Year	Shane Gates
U19 Player of the Year	Lihleli Xoli

== See also ==
- Eastern Province Elephants
- Southern Kings
- 2012 Vodacom Cup
- 2012 Currie Cup First Division
- 2012 Under-21 Provincial Championship
- 2012 Under-19 Provincial Championship
