= Rynier Bernardo =

South African rugby player (born 1991)

- Full name: Rynier Mark Bernardo
- Born: 27 August 1991 (age 35) Pretoria, South Africa
- Height: 1.99 m (6 ft 6 1/2 in)
- Weight: 112 kg (247 lb; 17 st 9 lb)
- School: Framesby High, Port Elizabeth

Rugby union career
- Position: Lock
- Current team: Cheetahs / Free State Cheetahs
Youth career
- 2007–2012: Eastern Province Kings
Senior career
| Years | Team | Apps | (Points) |
| 2012–2014 | Eastern Province Kings | 19 | (0) |
| 2013 | Southern Kings | 10 | (0) |
| 2014–2016 | Ospreys | 35 | (0) |
| 2016–2017 | Scarlets | 13 | (0) |
| 2017–2018 | Free State Cheetahs | 7 | (0) |
| 2017–2018 | Cheetahs | 20 | (5) |
| 2018–2020 | Canon Eagles | 17 | (0) |
| 2021– | Free State Cheetahs | 14 | (0) |
| 2021– | Cheetahs | | |
- Correct as of 10 July 2022
International career
| Years | Team | Apps | (Points) |
| 2008 | SA Schools Academy | | |
- Correct as of 22 April 2018

Rynier Mark Bernardo (born 27 August 1991) is a South African rugby union player who currently plays as a lock for the Free State Cheetahs in the South African Currie Cup.

== Playing career ==
=== Youth ===
Bernardo represented Eastern Province at various youth tournaments. In 2007, he played at the Under-16 Grant Khomo Week. The following year, he played for them at the Under-18 Academy week, resulting in his inclusion in the S.A. Schools Academy team in the same year. He also played at the 2009 Under-18 Craven Week tournament.

Bernardo was included in the Eastern Province U19 squad for the 2010 Under-19 Provincial Championship competition, as well as for Eastern Province U21 in the Under-21 competition in 2011 and 2012.

=== Eastern Province Kings ===
Bernardo was included in the senior squad for the 2012 Vodacom Cup competition and made his first class debut during that competition, coming on as a third-minute substitute in their match against near neighbours Border Bulldogs. He made one more substitute appearance in that competition and then started the matches against the Boland Cavaliers and the quarter-final against the Pumas.

His Currie Cup debut came a few months later against the SWD Eagles in the 2012 Currie Cup First Division competition. He made six appearances in total in that competition and also started both promotion/relegation games against the Free State Cheetahs.

=== Southern Kings ===
Bernardo was named in the Southern Kings squad for the 2013 Super Rugby season. He didn't play in the first three matches of the season, being behind David Bulbring, Steven Sykes and Daniel Adongo in the pecking order. However, an injury to Sykes saw him included for their match against the Crusaders in Christchurch and he substituted Adongo to make his Super Rugby debut. Another substitute appearance followed in their next match against the Hurricanes before he made his first start in the competition in the dramatic 28–28 draw against the Brumbies in Canberra, where an injury time try by Cornell du Preez plus subsequent conversion from Demetri Catrakilis secured an away draw for the Kings. He also started their next match, in Melbourne against the Rebels, an equally dramatic match with a Catrakilis drop goal in injury time securing the Kings' first ever away win.

He dropped to the bench for their next match against the Bulls before returning to the starting line-up for matches against the Cheetahs and Waratahs. Three more substitute appearances followed, bringing his tally to ten matches in total. The return to fitness of Darron Nell at the end of the season saw him revert to the Eastern Province Kings side playing in the 2013 Vodacom Cup and 2013 Currie Cup First Division competitions.

=== Cheetahs ===
With the Kings not playing Super Rugby in 2014, Bernardo – along with Shane Gates – joined the Cheetahs for pre-season training prior to the 2014 Super Rugby season. However, he was not named in their final squad and returned to Port Elizabeth.

=== Ospreys ===
In April 2014, it was announced that Bernardo joined Welsh Pro12 side Ospreys on a deal until 2017. Bernardo suffered a dislocated kneecap during the 2015–16 season and was ruled out for the rest of the season.

=== Scarlets ===
In June 2016, Bernardo joined another Welsh Pro12 side, Scarlets.

=== Free State Cheetahs ===
After the 2017–18 European season, Bernardo returned to South Africa to join the Free State Cheetahs for the 2017 Currie Cup Premier Division season.

=== Canon Eagles ===
Bernardo joined Canon Eagles prior to the 2018–19 Top League season.
