= Scott van Breda =

South African rugby union player (born 1991)

- Full name: Scott Alexander van Breda
- Born: 12 December 1991 (age 34)
- Height: 1.87 m (6 ft 1 1/2 in)
- Weight: 96 kg (212 lb; 15 st 2 lb)
- School: Rondebosch Boys' High School

Rugby union career
- Position: Full back / Wing / Centre
- Current team: Jersey Reds
Youth career
- 2011–2012: Eastern Province Kings
Senior career
| Years | Team | Apps | (Points) |
| 2012–2015 | Eastern Province Kings | 64 | (405) |
| 2013 | Southern Kings | 2 | (18) |
| 2016–2017 | Western Province | 20 | (95) |
| 2016 | Stormers | 3 | (0) |
| 2017–2018 | Jersey Reds | 18 | (34) |
| 2018–2021 | Worcester Warriors | 9 | (16) |
| 2019 | → Southern Kings | 3 | (18) |
| 2021 | Jersey Reds | 18 | (30) |
| 2023- | Jersey | | |
- Correct as of 20 April 2018
- Cricket career

Cricket information
- Batting: Right-handed
- Bowling: Right-arm medium
- Role: All-rounder

International information
- National side: Jersey
- T20I debut (cap 28): 6 June 2025 v Guernsey
- Last T20I: 7 June 2025 v Guernsey

Career statistics
| Competition | T20I | LA |
|---|---|---|
| Matches | 2 | 2 |
| Runs scored | 3 | 49 |
| Batting average | 3.00 | 24.50 |
| 100s/50s | 0/0 | 0/0 |
| Top score | 3 | 40 |
| Balls bowled | 18 | 28 |
| Wickets | 0 | 0 |
| Bowling average | – | – |
| 5 wickets in innings | 0 | 0 |
| 10 wickets in match | 0 | 0 |
| Best bowling | 0/10 | 0/8 |
| Catches/stumpings | 0/– | 0/– |
- Source: Cricinfo, 7 November 2026

Scott Alexander van Breda (born 12 December 1991) is a South African rugby union player and cricketer. He plays rugby union for RFU Championship side Jersey Reds. as a utility back, that can play as centre, full-back or winger. Van Breda also plays international cricket for Jersey.

== Rugby career ==
Van Breda played for Eastern Province U21 in the 2011 Under-21 Provincial Championship, scoring 108 points in eight appearances to finish as the top scorer in Group B of the competition to help his side reach the final of the competition where they lost 23–19 to Border U21 in Wellington.

He made just four appearances in the 2012 Under-21 Provincial Championship, but scored 90 points to once again finish as his team's top scorer and just three points behind the top scorer in Group B, SWD U21s' Chris Willemse. Van Breda was brought in to play in the final three matches of the regular season and managed to score two tries in each of those matches; their 73–3 victory over the Griffons U21 saw Van Breda contributing 28 points by scoring two tries and kicking nine conversions, he got two tries, two penalties and two conversions in their 41–3 victory over the Pumas and he had an even bigger personal tally in his next match for them against Griquas U21, scoring two tries, four conversions and five penalties in a 33-point haul in their 43–31 victory. He missed the semi-final, but returned to play for them in the final, where he kicked nine points to help his side win the competition by beating the SWD U21s 24–10.

=== Eastern Province Kings / Southern Kings ===
He made his first class debut for the Eastern Province Kings in the 2012 Vodacom Cup, starting their Round One match against Argentinean invitational side Pampas XV in Stellenbosch. His first senior points came in their second match of the season when he scored a try in the Kings' 40–23 victory over their Eastern Cape neighbours, the Border Bulldogs. He scored further tries against Western Province, Sharks XV and Boland Cavaliers to finish as the Kings' top try scorer in the competition. He also kicked six penalties during the season for a tally of 38 points, the second-highest for the Kings behind first-choice kicker Justin van Staden.

After making a further first class appearance against a South African Students side, Van Breda played in his first Currie Cup campaign. He started their opening match of the 2012 Currie Cup First Division season against the Boland Cavaliers in Wellington and made a total of four starts and six appearances off the bench during the season, scoring one try against the Border Bulldogs. The Eastern Province Kings finished top of the log to qualify for the play-offs and Van Breda came on as a late substitute in their semi-final match against the Leopards, but was not involved in the final, where the Kings won 26–25 to win their second First Division title in three years. He did make a late appearance in their promotion play-off second leg match against the Free State Cheetahs, but they lost the match 16–6 and lost 69–20 on aggregate to remain in the First Division for 2013.

2013 saw the Southern Kings' debut in the Super Rugby tournament. Van Breda was initially named in the Kings' wider training squad for the 2013 Super Rugby season, but was subsequently released to their Vodacom Cup squad. However, winger Sergeal Petersen picked up an injury prior to the Southern Kings' Super Rugby game against the Bulls and Van Breda was called up to the squad. He came on as a late substitute in the match to make his Super Rugby debut.

Meanwhile, he started six of their matches during the 2013 Vodacom Cup and was the top scorer for the Kings with 54 points as they reached the semi-final of the competition for the first time in their history, eventually losing 39–13 to the Pumas in Nelspruit.

The Kings finished bottom of the South African Conference during the 2013 Super Rugby and had to play in a relegation play-off against the Lions. With the Kings' first-choice fly-half Demetri Catrakilis ruled out of the second leg of the play-off through injury, Van Breda was included in the run-on side and took over the kicking duties. He scored 18 points for the Southern Kings as they beat the Lions 23–18 in the match in Johannesburg, which included a try in the final ten minutes of the match, but it wasn't enough to preserve the Kings' Super Rugby status as they lost the play-off series 44–42 on aggregate.

Van Breda played a key role for the Eastern Province Kings during the 2013 Currie Cup First Division, starting 13 of their 16 matches and scoring 146 points, the third highest in the competition. This helped them to second place in the log and a spot in the end-of-season play-offs. He scored 22 points in an epic semi-final match against the Leopards, which ended 22–22 after the regulation 80 minutes before a penalty and a conversion of Kayle van Zyl's late try saw the EP Kings finally emerge as 32–29 victors. They lost the final 53–30 to the Pumas, but were still promoted to the 2014 Currie Cup Premier Division following the South African Rugby Union's decision to expand the division to eight teams.

Along with fullback Siviwe Soyizwapi, Van Breda was included in the Stormers squad prior to the 2014 Super Rugby season, but he returned to Port Elizabeth without playing any matches.

Van Breda made just one appearance during the 2014 Vodacom Cup in their match against Kenyan side Simba XV as he was part of a group concentrating on conditioning prior to their Currie Cup Premier Division campaign. In June 2014, he was selected in the starting line-up for the Eastern Province Kings side to face Wales during a tour match during a 2014 incoming tour. He played the entire match as the Kings suffered a 12–34 defeat. He made his debut in the Premier Division of the Currie Cup on the opening day of the season against Western Province and played in a total of eight matches, finishing the season as the Kings' top scorer with 44 points. He scored a consolation try for the EP Kings in their 60–19 defeat to the Golden Lions in Johannesburg, but had a far more vital contribution in their final match of the season, scoring a try in the 74th minute which helped his side beat the Pumas 26–25 to secure their only win of the season.

He made his 50th appearance for the EP Kings by playing off the bench in their first match of the 2015 Vodacom Cup season, a 19–27 defeat to defending champions Griquas.

=== Jersey Reds ===
On 14 July 2017, Van Breda signed for English club Jersey Reds, who compete in the RFU Championship ahead of the 2017-18 season.

=== Worcester Warriors ===
On 22 February 2018, Premiership side Worcester Warriors announced the signing of Van Breda for the 2018-19 season.

=== Return to Jersey Reds ===
Van Breda returned to Jersey Reds on a short-term loan deal for the remainder of the season in March 2021 during the 2020–21 season. However, on 27 May 2021, van Breda would sign a new deal to re-join Jersey Reds on a permanent basis for the 2021-22 season, where he was named new club captain over the summer.

=== Coaching ===
After Jersey Reds went out of business, van Breda was appointed attack and backs coach at amateur club Jersey RFC.

== Cricket career ==
Van Breda played a crucial role for Jersey's Farmers Cricket Club as they won the 2025 T10 European Cricket League, taking three wickets in their semi-final win over Skanderborg from Norway.

In June 2025, he was named in the Jersey squad for the T20I Inter-Insular Series against Guernsey, having fulfilled the three-year residency requirement.

Van Breda was included in the Jersey squad for the Cricket World Cup Challenge League A final round in Kenya in October 2026. He made his List A debut in their third match of the tournament against Kuwait, scoring 40 off 62 balls.
