= Shane Gates =

Japan international rugby union player (born 1992)

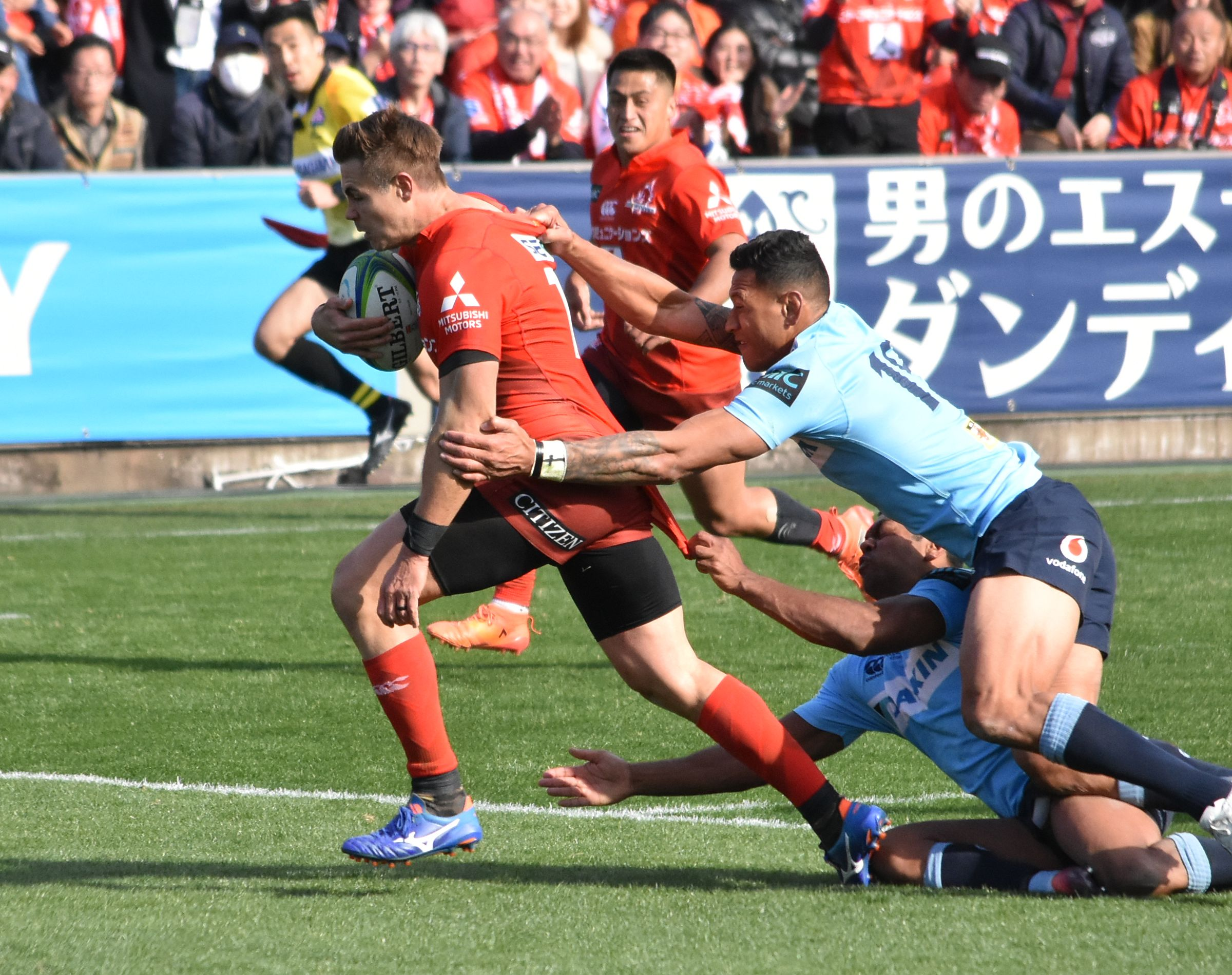
- Full name: Shane Edward Gates
- Born: 27 September 1992 (age 34) Port Elizabeth, South Africa
- Height: 1.82 m (5 ft 11 1/2 in)
- Weight: 91 kg (201 lb; 14 st 5 lb)
- School: Muir College, Uitenhage

Rugby union career
- Position: Fly-half / Centre
- Current team: NTT Communications Shining Arcs
Youth career
- 2010–2012: Eastern Province Kings
Senior career
Years	Team	Apps	(Points)
2011–2015	Eastern Province Kings	24	(35)
2013 2016	Southern Kings	21	(5)
2016–present	NTT Communications Shining Arcs	100	(215)
2019	Sunwolves	3	(5)
- Correct as of 21 February 2021
International career
Years	Team	Apps	(Points)
2011	South African Kings	1	(0)
-	Japan	4	
- Correct as of 21 February 2013

Shane Edward Gates (born 27 September 1992) is a South African-born Japanese professional rugby union player, currently playing in the Japanese Top League with NTT Communications Shining Arcs. His usual position is fly-half or inside centre.

== Career ==
=== Youth ===
Gates was born in Port Elizabeth and played for the Eastern Province Kings in several underage competitions. He represented them at the Under-18 Craven Week competition in 2010 and also played for the Eastern Province U19 side in the 2010 Under-19 Provincial Championship. He represented the Eastern Province U21 side in the 2011, 2012 and 2013 competitions, helping them reach the Division B final on all three occasions and winning the title in 2012 and 2013.

=== Eastern Province Kings / Southern Kings ===
In 2011, Gates was included in the 2011 Vodacom Cup squad, but failed to make an appearance for the team, despite being named on the bench for their match against the Blue Bulls in Pretoria. His senior debut came during the 2012 Vodacom Cup competition against Argentinean invitational side Pampas XV in Stellenbosch; he started the match and also marked the occasion by scoring his first try, dotting down shortly before half-time. He made a further three starts and one substitute's appearance during the competition.

Gates made his Currie Cup debut at the end of 2012, when he started their match against the Free State Cheetahs in the promotion/relegation play-offs. Despite scoring a try, he could not help the Kings crashing to a 53–14 defeat and ultimately failing to win promotion.

Gates was named in the Southern Kings wider training squad for the 2013 Super Rugby season, but was subsequently released to the Vodacom Cup squad. However, he was later called back into the Super Rugby squad and made his debut in that competition against the Highlanders in a 34–27 victory in Port Elizabeth. He made four appearances from the bench before starting his first Super Rugby match, the final regular season match against the Sharks in Durban. He also played in both legs of the Kings' promotion/relegation matches against the Lions, which saw the Southern Kings fall out of Super Rugby for 2014.

With the Kings not playing Super Rugby in 2014, Gates – along with lock Rynier Bernardo – joined the Cheetahs for pre-season training prior to the 2014 Super Rugby season. However, he was not included in their final squad and returned to the Kings. He wasn't involved in the 2014 Vodacom Cup competition, instead training with the Kings' Currie Cup group prior to the 2014 Currie Cup Premier Division season. In June 2014, he was selected in the starting line-up for the Eastern Province Kings side to face Wales during a tour match during a 2014 incoming tour. He played the first 72 minutes of the match as the Kings suffered a 12–34 defeat.

In May 2015, Gates captained the side for the first time in a friendly encounter against the Golden Lions. With the Kings returning to Super Rugby in 2016 season, Gates was named vice-captain for the season. He captained the Kings for first time against the Cheetahs in May following an injury to regular captain Steven Sykes.

=== NTT Shining Arcs ===
In June 2016, it was announced that Gates would join Japanese Top League side NTT Communications Shining Arcs on a two-year deal following the 2016 Super Rugby season.

=== Representative rugby ===
In 2011, Gates was included in a South African Kings squad that participated in the 2011 IRB Nations Cup in Romania. He made substitute appearances in their matches against Georgia and Portugal and was an unused substitute against Romania.
