= Jacopo Sarto =

Italy international rugby union player

- Born: 15 July 1990 (age 36) Zevio
- Height: 1.92 m (6 ft 4 in)
- Weight: 108 kg (17 st 0 lb; 238 lb)
- Notable relative: Leonardo Sarto (brother)

Rugby union career
- Position: Flanker
Youth career
- Petrarca
Senior career
Years	Team	Apps	(Points)
2009−2011	Petrarca	2	(0)
2011−2012	San Gregorio	18	(0)
2012−2014	Petrarca	38	(30)
2014	→ Benetton	1	(5)
2014–2018	Zebre	57	(20)
2018−2022	Colorno	68	(5)
- Correct as of 10 October 2017
International career
Years	Team	Apps	(Points)
- Italy Under 20
2014	Emerging Italy	3	(0)
2016	Italy	1	(0)
- Correct as of 10 October 2017

Jacopo Sarto (born 15 July 1990) is a retired Italian rugby union player. His usual position was as a Flanker.

In 2014 he was named Permit Player for Benetton and from 2014 to 2018 he played for Zebre. From 2018 to 2022 he played for Colorno in Top12.

After playing for Emerging Italy squad in 2014, in 2016 Sarto was named in the Italy squad. He represented Italy 3 times in official test matches.
