= Charl du Plessis (rugby union) =

South African rugby union player

- Full name: Charl Francois du Plessis
- Born: 8 April 1987 (age 39) Cape Town, South Africa
- Height: 1.87 m (6 ft 1 1/2 in)
- Weight: 113 kg (249 lb; 17 st 11 lb)
- School: Hoërskool Monument, Krugersdorp

Rugby union career
- Position: Prop
- Current team: Eastern Province Kings
Youth career
- 2005–2008: Golden Lions
Amateur team(s)
Years	Team	Apps	(Points)
2008–2009	UJ	12	(0)
Senior career
Years	Team	Apps	(Points)
2008–2010	Golden Lions	7	(0)
2009	→ Falcons	9	(0)
2010–2012	Boland Cavaliers	31	(0)
2012–2014	Eastern Province Kings	31	(0)
2013	Southern Kings	3	(0)
2008–2014	Total	81	(0)
- Correct as of 30 March 2015
International career
Years	Team	Apps	(Points)
2005	South Africa Schools 'B'		

Charl Francois 'KP' du Plessis (born 8 April 1987) is a former South African professional rugby union player that played domestically for the Golden Lions, Falcons, Boland Cavaliers and the Eastern Province Kings and also played Super Rugby with the Southern Kings, making a total of 81 first class appearances between 2008 and 2014. His regular position was prop.

== Career ==
=== Youth ===
Du Plessis went to Hoërskool Monument in Krugersdorp, where his performances for his school earned him a selection to the Golden Lions team that participated at the Under-18 Craven Week competition held in Bloemfontein in 2005. He was also selected in a South Africa Schools 'B' team in the same year.

=== Golden Lions / UJ / Falcons ===
He joined the Golden Lions Academy after high school and played for the Golden Lions U19 during the 2006 Under-19 Provincial Championship before making the step up to the Golden Lions U21 team for the 2007 Under-21 Provincial Championship.

In 2008, he was named in university side UJ's squad for the 2008 Varsity Cup, the inaugural edition of the premier university rugby union competition in South Africa. He made two appearances for UJ in the competition before switching to the Golden Lions squad for the 2008 Vodacom Cup. He made his first class debut in their match against SWD Eagles, coming on for the final few minutes of a 20–6 victory. That was his only involvement in the competition, but he did appear in two more Varsity Cup matches for UJ. In the second half of 2008, he once again played for the Golden Lions U21s in the Under-21 Provincial Championship.

In the 2009 Varsity Cup, he made a single appearance for UJ before again being involved in the Golden Lions' 2009 Vodacom Cup campaign. He started a first class match for the first time in Round Five of the competition, suffering a 21–26 defeat to eventual champions Griquas in Kimberley, before making a further three starts, including the quarter-final match, where the Golden Lions were eliminated by losing 7–20 to Sharks XV in Durban.

He joined the Golden Lions' near neighbours, Kempton Park-based side Falcons on loan for the duration of the 2009 Currie Cup First Division. He made his debut in the Currie Cup for the Falcons in their match against the Griffons in Kempton Park, finishing on the wrong end of a 39–27 scoreline. Du Plessis featured in eight matches – starting seven of those – in a season to forget for the Falcons, as they lost all ten of their matches in the competition.

He was the undoubted first-choice loosehead prop for UJ during the 2010 Varsity Cup competition, starting all seven of their matches as UJ finished in fifth position, missing out on a play-off spot. As in the previous two years, he then played for the Golden Lions in the 2010 Vodacom Cup competition, appearing in two matches. This brought his total number of appearances for the Golden Lions in three seasons of Vodacom Cup rugby to seven, although he never appeared at Currie Cup level for them.

=== Boland Cavaliers ===
In 2010, he moved to Wellington to join the Boland Cavaliers. He made his Boland debut in the 2010 Currie Cup First Division against the team he represented in the competition in 2009, the Falcons. He came on just after half time and helped his new side to a 53–10 victory. He made a total of eight appearances in the competition, starting two of those, as they reached the semi-finals of the competition, where they narrowly lost to the Eastern Province Kings, going down 25–26 in Port Elizabeth.

He made seven appearances for Boland during the 2011 Vodacom Cup competition, offering the side versatility by being able to play as a loosehead or a tighthead prop. Du Plessis featured in nine of the Boland Cavaliers' ten matches during the regular season of the 2011 Currie Cup First Division, with Boland winning nine of those matches to finish top of the log. He played off the bench in the semi-final, where a 50–20 victory over Welkom-based side Griffons saw them advance to the final, as well as the final itself, with Boland avenging their 2010 final defeat by running out 43–12 winners over the Eastern Province Kings in Wellington to be crowned First Division champions. However, the South African Rugby Union announced that the Premier Division would be reduced from eight teams to six for 2012, meaning that promotion wasn't a possibility for the Cavaliers.

Du Plessis started four matches for the Boland Cavaliers during the 2012 Vodacom Cup, narrowly missing out on qualifying for the semi-finals, finishing behind Argentine side Pampas XV on points difference only.

=== Eastern Province Kings ===
He then moved to the team he faced in two consecutive First Division finals, Port Elizabeth-based Eastern Province Kings, for the 2012 Currie Cup First Division season. He made his EP Kings debut in Round Four of the competition in a 56–5 victory over the Border Bulldogs. He made a total of ten appearances, starting just one of those, a 45–24 win against the Falcons. The EP Kings topped the log after the regular season and went on to win the competition by beating the Pumas 26–25 in the final. This meant that Du Plessis won his second consecutive First Division title, despite missing the play-off matches through injury.

Super Rugby came to Port Elizabeth for the first time for the 2013 Super Rugby season and Du Plessis was named in the Southern Kings wider training squad for the competition, but subsequently released to the Vodacom Cup squad. He made eight appearances for the EP Kings during the 2013 Vodacom Cup, helping them reach the semi-finals for the first time in their history. He started the quarter-final, where an extraordinary comeback saw them beat the Blue Bulls 34–31 in Pretoria, as well as the final, when they lost 13–39 to the Pumas in Nelspruit.

Following an injury to first choice tighthead prop Kevin Buys prior the Kings' penultimate regular season Super Rugby match against the Stormers, he was included on the bench and came on as a 72-minute substitute to make his Super Rugby debut. He made his first Super Rugby start the following week against the Sharks in Durban and also played in the second leg of their relegation play-off series against the Lions, with a 23–18 victory in Johannesburg not enough to secure the Kings' Super Rugby status.

He started eight matches in the 2013 Currie Cup First Division to help the EP Kings reach their fourth consecutive final, this time losing 30–53 to the Pumas in Nelspruit. However, a decision by the South African Rugby Union to increase the number of teams in the Premier Division in 2014 from six to eight, saw both teams promoted.

In 2014, he didn't feature in any matches during the 2014 Vodacom Cup, but he was selected in the starting line-up for the Eastern Province Kings side that faced Wales during a tour match during their 2014 incoming tour. He was stretchered off with a neck injury shortly before half-time as the Kings suffered a 12–34 defeat. He recovered in time to play in his first ever match in the Premier Division of the Currie Cup, playing off the bench against the Sharks. He also made substitute appearances against Griquas and their only win of the season, a 26–25 defeat of the Pumas in Port Elizabeth.

=== Retirement ===
He announced his retirement from rugby in March 2015, aged 27. He suffered from persistent back problems and decided to retire following medical advice to take up a role as the manager of a game reserve in Limpopo.
