= Johan Snyman =

South African rugby player (born 1986)

- Born: 9 July 1986 (age 40) Evander
- Height: 2.00 m (6 ft 6 1/2 in)
- Weight: 112 kg (247 lb; 17 st 9 lb)
- School: Outeniqua High School

Rugby union career
- Position: Lock
- Current team: Brive
Youth career
- 2004: SWD Eagles
- 2005–2006: Sharks
Amateur team(s)
Years	Team	Apps	(Points)
2011	UJ	2	(5)
Senior career
Years	Team	Apps	(Points)
2006–2009	Sharks (Currie Cup)	11	(5)
2008	→ Hawke's Bay Magpies		
2009–2011	Golden Lions	30	(25)
2012	Eastern Province Kings	4	(0)
2012–2015	Scarlets	56	(10)
2015–2019	Brive	21	(0)
- Correct as of 13 June 2015
International career
Years	Team	Apps	(Points)
2005	South Africa Under-19s		
- Correct as of 9 August 2012

Johan 'Joe' Snyman (born 9 July 1986) is a South African rugby union player, currently playing with French team Brive.

He was born in Evander, but went to Outeniqua High School in George. He played for the SWD Eagles at the 2004 Craven Week, before moving to the Sharks in 2005. He was also called up to the South Africa Under 19 squad for the 2005 Under 19 Rugby World Championship, which was won by South Africa.

He made 11 appearances for the Sharks Vodacom Cup and Currie Cup sides. They then sent him to the International Rugby Academy in New Zealand, where he also had a short spell at New Zealand ITM Cup team Hawke's Bay Magpies.

In 2009, he moved to the Golden Lions, where he played in their Vodacom Cup and Currie Cup teams (including being part of the squad that won the 2011 Currie Cup Premier Division) and also played two games for UJ in the 2011 Varsity Cup.

He joined the Eastern Province Kings for the start of the 2012 Vodacom Cup season.

On 5 September 2012, he joined Welsh team Scarlets for the 2012–2013 season on a three-year contract.

On 8 June 2015, Snyman joins Top 14 club CA Brive in France from the 2015–2016 season.
