= San Gregorio Catania Rugby =

Former Italian rugby union, based in Catania

(Italy) San Gregorio Catania Rugby
- Full name: A.S.D. San Gregorio Catania Rugby
- Union: FIR
- Founded: 1990
- Disbanded: 2012
- Location: San Gregorio di Catania, Italy
- Ground: Stadio Monti Rossi (Capacity: 2,000)
1st kit	2nd kit

The San Gregorio Catania Rugby, is a former Italian rugby union team founded in 1990 and disbanded in 2012 for economic reasons.

== History ==
The club was founded in San Gregorio di Catania in 1990, adopting green and blue as social colors. The team played his home games in the Stadio Monti Rossi in Nicolosi in the province of Catania, despite having his headquarters in San Gregorio di Catania.

In the 2009–10 season they finished 1st in Serie A2, reaching the promotion playoffs to the Super 10 (now Top12). However they lost against Mogliano on neutral ground. The following year, in Serie A1, they were again knocked out of the playoffs, however they were promoted to the Excellence, the Italian top tier championship, as a result of the failure of the Rugby Roma Olimpic.

In the 2011–12 Excellence season, San Gregorio Catania, trained by the head coach Orazio Arancio, is ranked tenth, the last place in the Italian championship, being relegated to the Serie A1 where he retires from the championship during the 2012–13 regular season for economic reasons.

== Notable former players ==
- (Italy) Orazio Arancio
- (Italy) Jacopo Sarto
- (Japan) Wimpie van der Walt
