= Wimpie van der Walt =

Japan international rugby union player

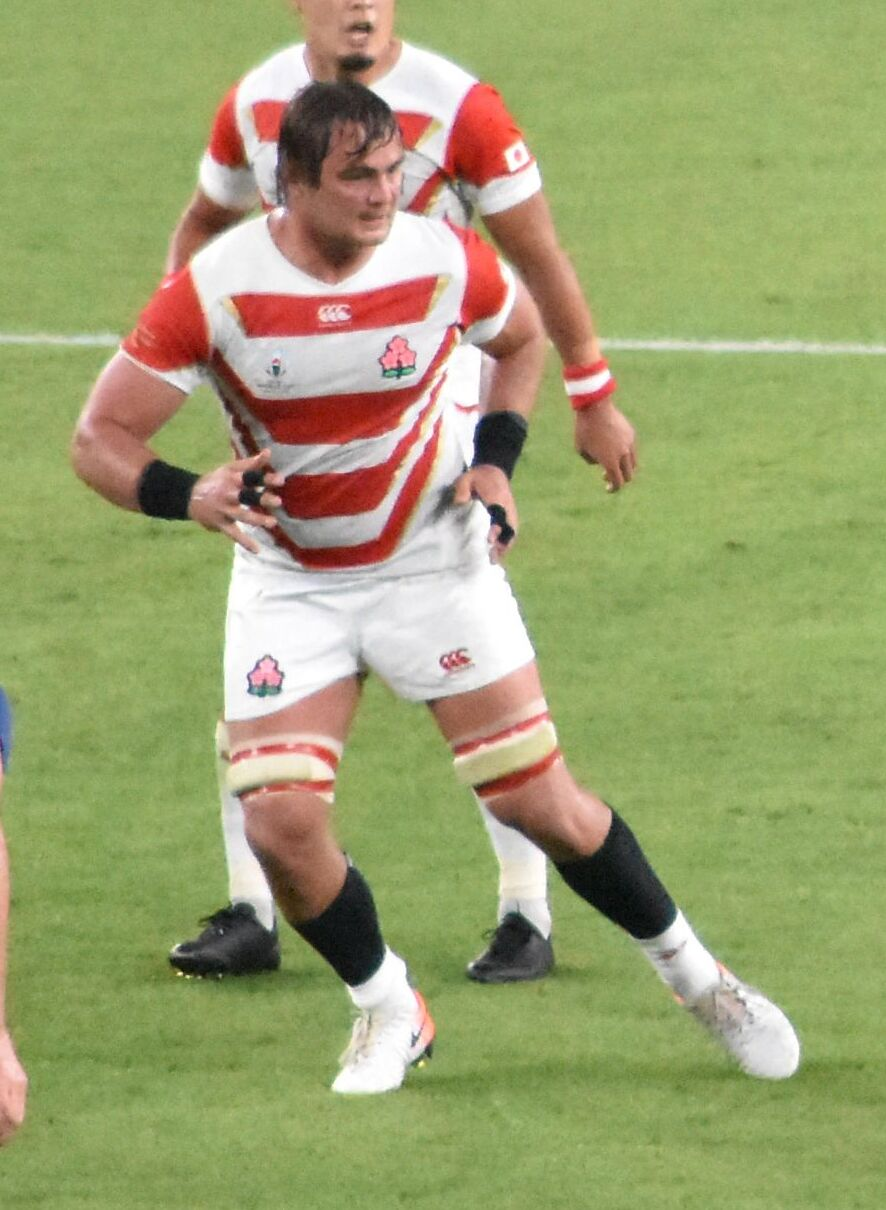
- Van der Walt in 2019 World Rugby
- Full name: Petrus Willem van der Walt
- Born: 6 January 1989 (age 37) Brits, South Africa
- Height: 1.88 m (6 ft 2 in)
- Weight: 110 kg (240 lb; 17 st 5 lb)
- School: Hoërskool Nelspruit, Nelspruit

Rugby union career
- Position(s): Lock, Flanker
Youth career
- 2006–2007: Pumas
- 2008–2010: Western Province
Senior career
Years	Team	Apps	(Points)
2009–2012	Western Province	16	(30)
2012	San Gregorio	16	(10)
2012	Eastern Province Kings	15	(15)
2013	Southern Kings	17	(30)
2013–2022	NTT DoCoMo Red Hurricanes	61	(70)
2014	Blue Bulls	5	(10)
2014	Bulls	4	(0)
2018	Sunwolves	9	(0)
2022–2025	Urayasu D-Rocks	16	(15)
- Correct as of 21 February 2021
International career
Years	Team	Apps	(Points)
2017−2022	Japan	22	(10)
- Correct as of 21 February 2021

Petrus Willem van der Walt (born 6 January 1989 in Brits, North West) is a South African-born Japanese rugby union player who represents Japan at international level and is currently playing with NTT DoCoMo Red Hurricanes in the Japanese Top League. His regular position is lock or flanker.

== Career ==
=== Youth ===
Van der Walt represented the Pumas at the 2006 and 2007 Craven Week tournaments. He then joined Western Province and represented them at Under-19 and Under-21 levels between 2008 and 2010. He was also included in the Maties squad for the 2010 Varsity Cup, but never made an appearance.

=== Western Province ===
He made his first team debut for Western Province in a Vodacom Cup match on 27 February 2010 against Boland Cavaliers. and made his Currie Cup debut the following year against Griquas. In total, he made fifteen Vodacom Cup and two Currie Cup appearances for Western Province.

=== San Gregorio ===
In October 2011, he joined Italian National Championship of Excellence team San Gregorio and made sixteen appearances for them in the 2011–2012 season, but could not help stop them from finishing last in the table and getting relegated to Serie A1 in 2012–13.

=== Eastern Province Kings ===
He returned to South Africa a few months later and joined Eastern Province Kings for the 2012 Currie Cup First Division season. He made his debut on 30 July 2012 in the opening game of the season against Boland Cavaliers.

=== Southern Kings ===
He was named in the Southern Kings squad for the 2013 Super Rugby season. He made his debut in the first match of the season against the Force and quickly established himself as a first team regular, starting the fifteen out of the sixteen matches that season.

He scored his first try for the Kings in their defeat to the Crusaders in Christchurch. He also scored a try in the Kings' dramatic 28–28 draw against the Brumbies, as well as a week later, when he scored a late try against the Rebels (the resulting conversion by Demetri Catrakilis tied the game at 27–27 and an injury-time drop goal secured a 30–27 win for the Kings). He also scored in the 19–11 defeat to the Stormers and got two tries the following week against the Bulls to become the Kings' leading try-scorer for the season with six tries.

=== NTT Docomo Red Hurricanes ===
He signed for Japanese Top League side NTT Docomo Red Hurricanes for the 2013–14 season, scoring two tries in 13 appearances.

=== Bulls ===
He returned to South Africa following the conclusion of the 2013–14 Top League and joined the Bulls on a two-month contract during the 2014 Super Rugby season.

=== Return to NTT Docomo Red Hurricanes and representing Japan ===
After the Super Rugby season, he returned to the Hurricanes squad to ply his trade. In November 2017 he was called up into the squad for Japan. He made his Test debut against Australia and made another two appearances in November. The South African born forward entered the 2019 Super Rugby season with 28 Super Rugby caps and 9 test caps for Japan. He cemented his place into the Japan's squad for the 2019 Rugby World Cup and has made 15 appearances for Japan heading into the quarter-finals of the tournament.
