= Phumlani Nodikida =

South African rugby union player

- Born: Phumlani Eddie Nodikida; 4 December 1978 (age 47) Peddie
- Height: 1.88 m (6 ft 2 in)
- Weight: 113 kg (17 st 11 lb)
- School: Qaphelani High School

Rugby union career
- Position: Prop
Amateur team(s)
Years	Team	Apps	(Points)
SA amateur	SA Kings		
Provincial / State sides
Years	Team	Apps	(Points)
2006	Mighty Elephants	23	(0)
- Griquas
2007	Eastern Province Kings	5	(0)
- Correct as of 26 November 2011

Phumlani Nodikida (born 4 December 1978) is a South African rugby union player.

He started playing his rugby for the Mighty Elephants and has represented the team throughout his career, except for a spell playing for Griquas in the 2007 season.
