= Falie Oelschig =

South African rugby union player

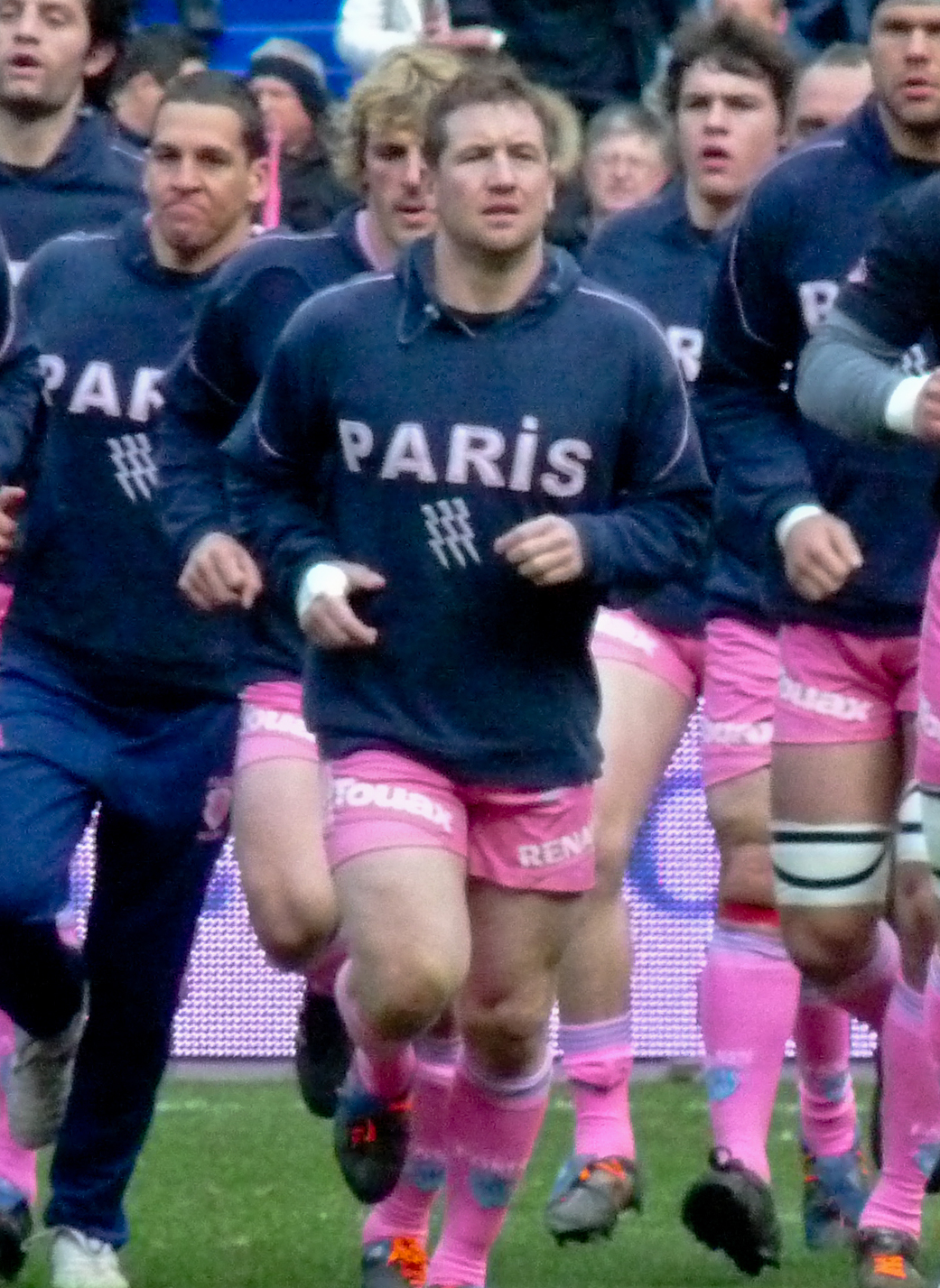
- Full name: Noël Herman Oelschig
- Born: 14 January 1979 (age 47) Bloemfontein, South Africa
- Height: 1.72 m (5 ft 7 1/2 in)
- Weight: 75 kg (165 lb; 11 st 11 lb)
- School: Grey College, Bloemfontein
- University: University of the Free State

Rugby union career
- Position: Scrum-half
- Current team: Eastern Province Kings
Youth career
- 1999–2000: Free State Cheetahs
Senior career
Years	Team	Apps	(Points)
2000, 2004–2007	Free State Cheetahs	67	(27)
2001–2004	SWD Eagles	58	(185)
2002	Stormers	5	(0)
2004	Sharks	7	(2)
2006–2008	Cheetahs	36	(8)
2008–2011	Stade Français	76	(264)
2011–present	Eastern Province Kings	31	(39)
- Correct as of 21 February 2013
International career
Years	Team	Apps	(Points)
1997	S.A. Schools		
1998	South Africa Under-19		
2000	South Africa Under-21	5	(28)
2004	S.A. 'A'	2	(0)
- Correct as of 21 February 2013

Falie Oelschig (born 14 January 1979) is a South African rugby union player for the Eastern Province Kings in the Currie Cup. He previously played for the Cheetahs in Super Rugby, the Free State Cheetahs and SWD Eagles in the Currie Cup and Vodacom Cup competitions and for Stade Français in the French Top 14.
