= Jaco Fourie (rugby union) =

South African rugby union player

- Born: Jaco Fourie; 19 April 1988 (age 38) Bloemfontein
- Height: 1.81 m (5 ft 11 1/2 in)
- Weight: 98 kg (15 st 6 lb)
- School: Grey College
- University: University of Pretoria

Rugby union career
- Position: Hooker
Provincial / State sides
Years	Team	Apps	(Points)
2007–2010	Blue Bulls		
2010–2011	Eastern Province Kings	11	(5)
- Correct as of 26 November 2011

Jaco Fourie (born 19 April 1988) is a South African rugby union player.

He was born in Bloemfontein and went to Grey College, but then played for the University of Pretoria in the FNB Varsity Cup in 2008 and represented the Blue Bulls in various underage competitions, as well as the Vodacom Cup. In 2010, he joined the Eastern Province Kings in the Currie Cup First Division.
