= Jongi Nokwe =

South African rugby union player (born 1981)

- Full name: Jongikhaya Lutric Nokwe
- Born: 30 December 1981 (age 44) Ngxalawe, South Africa
- Height: 1.86 m (6 ft 1 in)
- Weight: 90 kg (200 lb; 14 st 2 lb)
- School: Kwamfundo Secondary

Rugby union career
- Position: Wing
Amateur team(s)
Years	Team	Apps	(Points)
2014	College Rovers	8	(30)
Senior career
Years	Team	Apps	(Points)
2003–2007	Boland Cavaliers	55	(165)
2006	Stormers	6	(10)
2008–2010	Cheetahs	30	(75)
2008–2010	Free State Cheetahs	36	(130)
2011	→ Griffons	1	(0)
2012	Eastern Province Kings	6	(15)
2013	Falcons	14	(30)
2014	Sharks (Currie Cup)	1	(5)
International career
Years	Team	Apps	(Points)
2004–2005	South Africa Under-20		
2008–2009	South Africa	4	(25)
National sevens team
Years	Team		Comps
2004	South Africa 7s		2

Jongikhaya Lutric Nokwe (born 30 December 1981) is a South African former rugby union player who played as a winger.

He is a former Springbok during the period in which he played for the Cheetahs franchise in the Super 14 tournament, and the Free State Cheetahs in the domestic Currie Cup competition. He has also represented Boland Cavaliers and the Stormers, as well as the Eastern Province Kings, Falcons and the Sharks.

== Playing career ==
Nokwe made his international debut against Argentina on 9 August 2008 and scored a try as the Springboks won 63–9. In only his third game, he became the first Springbok player to score four tries against the Wallabies in a test match in a 53–8 victory at Ellis Park Stadium, Johannesburg before injuring his leg.

The following year he was selected in the South Africa squad to play the British and Irish Lions and started the final test as the Springboks won the series 2–1.

In 2005 Nokwe was named South African Young Player of the Year ahead of future Springboks Morné Steyn, Wynand Olivier, Ruan Pienaar and JP Pietersen.

In 2006 he was named Provincial Sportsman of the Year by the Department of Cultural Affairs and Sport in the Western Cape.

In November 2011, it was announced that he signed for the Eastern Province Kings for 2012.

He was released after just one season and signed for the Falcons for 2013, before joining Durban-based club side College Rovers before the 2014 SARU Community Cup.

=== Test history ===
No.	Opponents	Results (SA 1st)	Position	Tries	Dates	Venue
1.	Argentina	63–9	Wing	1	9 Aug 2008	Ellis Park, Johannesburg
2.	Australia	15–27	Wing		23 Aug 2008	Kings Park, Durban
3.	Australia	53–8	Wing	4	30 Aug 2008	Ellis Park, Johannesburg
4.	British and Irish Lions	9–28	Wing		4 Jul 2009	Ellis Park, Johannesburg

== Coaching career ==
After his retirement, Nokwe started coaching and he was appointed assistant coach of the Western Province women team. During September 2017, Nokwe was appointed coach of the SA Select Women's Sevens team for the Hokkaido Invitational Sevens in Japan.

== See also ==
- List of South Africa national rugby union players – Springbok no. 767
