= Kevin Buys =

South African rugby union player (1986–2026)

- Born: 26 April 1986 Benoni, South Africa
- Died: 11 May 2026 (aged 40) Boksburg in his home
- Height: 1.92 m (6 ft 4 in)
- Weight: 130 kg (290 lb; 20 st 7 lb)
- School: Hoërskool Dr EG Jansen
- University: University of Pretoria
- Notable relative: Father Stephanus Johannes van Coller.

Rugby union career
- Position: Prop
Youth career
- 2005–2007: Blue Bulls
Senior career
Years	Team	Apps	(Points)
2007	Blue Bulls	7	(0)
2007–2009	Brive	20	(5)
2009–2011	Golden Lions	24	(0)
2010–2011	Lions	13	(0)
2012–2013	Eastern Province Kings	2	(0)
2013	Southern Kings	17	(0)
2013–2017	Brive	75	(0)
2017–2018	Oyonnax	7	(0)
2018–2026	Beaune	0	(0)

Kevin Buys (26 April 1986 – 13 May 2026) was a South African rugby union player.

== Biography ==
Buys started his playing career at the Blue Bulls as a youth player. In 2007, he made his debut in the Vodacom Cup competition. He then moved to French club CA Brive in November 2007. He played in the Espoirs (their reserve team), but graduated to the first team. He made 15 appearances for the team in the 2007–08 Top 14 season. He just made a further five appearances for the team the following season, three of those in the 2008–09 European Challenge Cup.

He then returned to South Africa and joined the Golden Lions team in 2009. He played for them in the domestic Currie Cup and Vodacom Cup competitions, as well as for the Lions in the Super Rugby competition. At the start of 2012, he linked up with the Eastern Province Kings. He was also named in the Southern Kings squad for the 2013 Super Rugby season.

In 2013, he rejoined French Top 14 side CA Brive for a second time.

Buys died by heart attack in May 2026, at the age of 40.
