= Justin van Staden =

South African rugby union player

- Born: 3 June 1990 (age 36) Tzaneen, South Africa
- Height: 1.79 m (5 ft 10 1/2 in)
- Weight: 86 kg (190 lb; 13 st 8 lb)
- School: Merensky High School

Rugby union career
- Position: Full-back
Youth career
- 2008: Limpopo Blue Bulls
- 2009–2010: Blue Bulls
- 2011: Pumas
Amateur team(s)
Years	Team	Apps	(Points)
2010	UP Tuks	6	(69)
2011	TUT Vikings	6	(0)
2013	NMMU Madibaz	8	(50)
Senior career
Years	Team	Apps	(Points)
2010	Blue Bulls	1	(0)
2012	Eastern Province Kings	7	(66)
2013	SWD Eagles	12	(139)
2014–2018	Pumas	70	(408)
- Correct as of 27 October 2018
International career
Years	Team	Apps	(Points)
2013	South African Universities	1	(10)
- Correct as of 8 May 2013

Justin van Staden is a South African rugby union player who last played for the Pumas in the Currie Cup and in the Rugby Challenge.

== Career ==
He played for Limpopo Blue Bulls in the 2008 Craven Week tournament and then joined the Blue Bulls for 2009 and 2010, making one substitute appearance in the 2010 Vodacom Cup, before joining the Pumas in 2011. In 2012, he joined Despatch Rugby Club, but was soon drafted into the Eastern Province Kings squad, where he was included in their 2012 Vodacom Cup squad. He made his starting debut in the second game of the season against the Border Bulldogs.

He joined the SWD Eagles before the 2013 Currie Cup First Division season, but left after just one season to join the Pumas as a replacement for Carl Bezuidenhout.

He also played in the Varsity Cup competition, playing for UP Tuks in 2010, for TUT Vikings in 2011 and for NMMU Madibaz in 2013.

He was also named in a South African Universities team that played against Namibia in 2013.

He was a member of the Pumas side that won the Vodacom Cup for the first time in 2015, beating Western Province 24–7 in the final. Van Staden made eight appearances during the season, contributing 30 points with the boot.
