= Darron Nell =

South African rugby union player (born 1980)

- Full name: Darron Paul Nell
- Born: 3 August 1980 (age 46) Uitenhage, South Africa
- Height: 1.94 m (6 ft 4 1/2 in)
- Weight: 108 kg (238 lb; 17 st 0 lb)
- School: Muir College
- University: Port Elizabeth Technikon; Free State Technikon

Rugby union career
- Position: Lock / Flanker / No 8
- Current team: Eastern Province Kings
Youth career
- 2002: Free State Cheetahs
Senior career
Years	Team	Apps	(Points)
2002–2008	Free State Cheetahs	66	(55)
2007–2008	Cheetahs	10	(10)
2008–2010	Castres	31	(5)
2010–2014	Eastern Province Kings	56	(50)
2013	Southern Kings	7	(0)
- Correct as of 10 October 2014
International career
Years	Team	Apps	(Points)
2009	Southern Kings	1	(0)
2011	South African Kings	2	(0)
- Correct as of 21 February 2013

Darron Paul Nell (born 3 August 1980) is a South African professional rugby union player who most recently with the Eastern Province Kings. His usual positions are flanker and number 8.

Nell played rugby for the Free State Cheetahs between 2002 and 2008, mainly appearing as a flanker or number 8, before a short spell in France with Castres and then moving to the Eastern Province Kings where he was converted to a lock.

== Career ==
=== Free State Cheetahs / Cheetahs ===
Nell started playing his rugby for the Free State Cheetahs, making his first class debut for them during the 2002 Vodacom Cup competition. He made his Currie Cup debut during the 2003 Currie Cup competition, starting their Round 3 match against Western Province in Bloemfontein and helping his side to a 36–36 draw. He also scored his first senior try in the same competition in their match against the Golden Lions in a 34–30 victory as he played in a total of eleven matches for the men from Bloemfontein.

Nell made seven appearances during the 2004 Vodacom Cup competition, but missed the entire 2004 Currie Cup Premier Division campaign through injury. He returned to action during the 2005 Currie Cup qualifying series, starting their final match of the series and scoring a try in a 43–0 victory over the Griffons, before making a further two appearances in the Premier Division, but didn't feature in the play-off stages of the competition, where the Free State Cheetahs eventually beat the Blue Bulls 29–25 in the final to win the title for only the second time in their history.

Nell was a key member of the squad that played in the 2006 Vodacom Cup competition, starting 12 of their 13 matches during the competition and scoring four tries as they finished eighth in the competition. He remained an important player for their 2006 Currie Cup Premier Division campaign, where he also started in 12 of their matches during the season. This time around, he featured in the play-offs, playing in their 30–14 victory over the Sharks in the semi-finals and also started the final against the Blue Bulls in a repeat of the 2005 final. The season ended in dramatic fashion as the two sides played out a 25–25 draw in the regulation 80 minutes and a 28–28 draw after extra time to share the title.

In 2007, Nell was also involved in Super Rugby for the first time. He made his debut for the Cheetahs during the 2007 Super 14 season Round One match against the Stormers and appeared in the first five matches of the competition. He scored his first Super Rugby try in their 49–28 home defeat to the Crusaders, followed by his second try later in the same match to get his first senior brace. He made one appearance in the 2007 Vodacom Cup competition – a 25–18 defeat to Western Province at the Seisa Ramabodu Stadium in Bloemfontein – before once again being an instrumental player in their 2007 Currie Cup Premier Division campaign, making 13 appearances. He once again played in the final, with the Cheetahs beating the Golden Lions 20–18 to win the title for the third consecutive season.

Nell featured in a further five matches for the Cheetahs in the 2008 Super 14 season and featured in two matches in the 2008 Vodacom Cup. The last one of those – a 35–20 victory over the Boland Cavaliers in Bloemfontein – turned out to be his last appearance for the side. He was an unused replacement for their 2008 Currie Cup Premier Division match against the Blue Bulls in July 2008, but then announced that he was joining French Top 14 team Castres at the end of July 2008.

Nell made a total of 66 appearances for the Free State Cheetahs in Currie Cup and Vodacom Cup competitions between 2002 and 2008 and also played on ten occasions for Super Rugby side the Cheetahs.

=== Castres ===
Nell joined French Top 14 team Castres in July 2008 and remained there for the 2008–09 and 2009–10 seasons. He made his Castres debut in August 2008 against Bayonne, where his side suffered a 26–27 defeat. He played in a total of 14 matches for the side as they finished 12th in the competition, one place above the relegation zone. He also played three matches for the club in the 2008–09 Heineken Cup competition, but ended on the losing side in all three matches as Castres finished bottom of Pool 2.

Nell made nine appearances for Castres in the 2009–10 Top 14 season, a far more successful season for the side as they finished in 5th spot. He also started in five matches of their 2009–10 European Challenge Cup campaign, scoring his only try in Castres colours in a 47–0 victory over Italian side Rovigo as Castres finished third in Pool 3, failing to qualify to the knock-out stages.

Nell left Castres at the end of the 2009–2010 season, having scored one try in 31 appearances.

=== Eastern Province Kings / Southern Kings ===
During the Top 14 off-season in 2009, Nell returned to South Africa to represent the Southern Kings in their first ever match, a 20–8 defeat to the British & Irish Lions during their 2009 tour to South Africa.

A year later, when his contract at Castres expired, he returned to South Africa to join Port Elizabeth-based side the Eastern Province Kings for the 2010 Currie Cup First Division season. His Currie Cup debut for the Kings came in their 42–28 opening day victory over the Border Bulldogs in East London. He opened his scoring in his third match for the side, scoring two tries in a 33–22 win over the Boland Cavaliers and he made a total of seven appearances as the EP Kings made it to the final, where they faced the SWD Eagles. Nell came on as a substitute in the final, helping his side to a 16–12 win to become First Division champions. He also played off the bench in both legs of their promotion/relegation series against the Pumas, but the Kings failed to win promotion to the 2011 Currie Cup Premier Division.

Nell scored two tries in four appearances during the 2011 Vodacom Cup, as a points deduction scuppered the Kings' chances of reaching the quarter-finals. In June 2011, he was selected in a Southern Kings side that competed in the 2011 IRB Nations Cup as the South African Kings. He missed their 31–17 victory over Georgia, but appeared as a substitute in their second match against hosts Romania – a 27–23 victory – and started their 39–12 win over Portugal to help his side win the title.

Nell returned to domestic action, where he scored one try in eight appearances in the 2011 Currie Cup First Division season. However, the EP Kings failed to retain their title, losing 43–12 to the Boland Cavaliers in the final.

Nell made seven appearances in the 2012 Vodacom Cup to help the Kings reach the quarter-finals for only the third time in their history, where they lost 30–19 to the Pumas. Nell was a vital part of the Kings' 2012 Currie Cup First Division squad; he played in thirteen matches as they reached the final of the competition for the third consecutive season. Nell scored the Kings' first try in the final as they ran out 26–25 winners over the Pumas to clinch the title for the second time in three seasons. However, they once again failed to win their promotion/relegation series against Nell's former side Free State Cheetahs to remain in the First Division for 2013.

However, 2013 saw the Southern Kings participate in Super Rugby for the first time. Nell was named in their first ever Super Rugby squad and he made his Super Rugby debut for the Kings in their second match of the competition against the Sharks, but then missed the majority of the season through injury. He returned for the last four games of the regular season, starting both matches against the Stormers, as well as the Bulls. He was named captain for both the 2013 Super Rugby promotion/relegation matches against the Lions with Luke Watson and Andries Strauss out injured. The Kings lost the series 44–42 on aggregate to lose their Super Rugby berth to the Lions. After the conclusion of the Super Rugby campaign, Nell made five starts in the 2013 Currie Cup First Division and scored one try in their match against the Border Bulldogs. The Kings reached their fourth consecutive final, but lost the match 53–30 to the Pumas in Nelspruit.

In June 2014, he was selected in the starting line-up for the Eastern Province Kings side to face Wales during a tour match during a 2014 incoming tour and was also named captain of the team. He played the first 74 minutes of the match as the Kings suffered a 12–34 defeat. Following a decision from the South African Rugby Union to expand the Currie Cup Premier Division from six teams to eight teams, the Eastern Province Kings were promoted to the Premier Division of the Currie Cup. Nell scored one try in his six appearances in the competition; it came in their 28–13 loss to the Blue Bulls in Port Elizabeth. The Kings struggled to adjust to life in the Premier Division and lost their first nine matches of the season. They did, however, beat fellow promoted side the Pumas 26–25 in the final match of the season, with Nell playing the first 57 minutes of that match.
