= Kayle van Zyl =

South African rugby union player

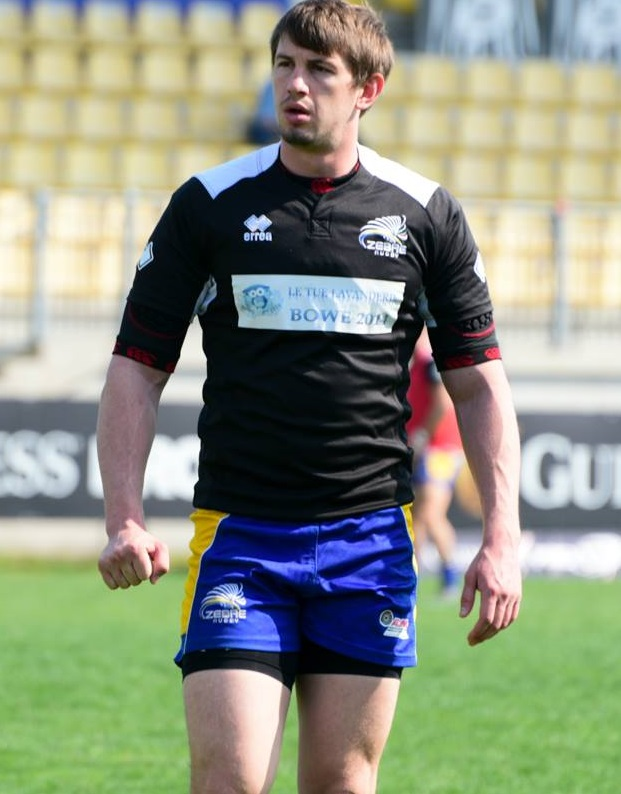
- Kayle van Zyl
- Full name: Kayle Deon van Zyl
- Born: Johannesburg
- Height: 1.85 m (6 ft 1 in)
- Weight: 91 kg (201 lb; 14 st 5 lb)
- School: Grey High School, Port Elizabeth; Nico Malan High School, Humansdorp
- University: Nelson Mandela Metropolitan University

Rugby union career
- Position: Fullback / Fly-half / Scrum-half / Wing
- Current team: Rugby Calvisano
Youth career
- 2009–2013: Eastern Province Kings
Amateur team(s)
Years	Team	Apps	(Points)
2014	NMMU Madibaz	2	(0)
Senior career
Years	Team	Apps	(Points)
2013–2014	Eastern Province Kings	18	(35)
2014–2015	Mogliano	17	(55)
2015–2017	Zebre	36	(40)
2017−2018	San Donà	13	(51)
2018−2023	Rugby Calvisano	70	(113)
- Correct as of 16 March 2023

Kayle Deon van Zyl is a South African rugby union player, currently playing with Italian side Rugby Calvisano, competing in the Top10 and European Rugby Continental Shield. He has the ability to play in any position in the back-line but has thus far mostly featured as a fullback.

== Youth ==
Van Zyl represented Eastern Province at the Under-13 in 2003 and 2009 in the Coca-Cola Under-18 Craven Week in East London alongside Springbok Captain Siya Kolisi, scoring his first try on day one against Western Province. He was awarded a rugby scholarship in 2009-2010 season for Hartpury College in Gloucestershire, before returning to join the Rugby Performance Centre in the Cape.

== Eastern Province Kings Academy ==
Van Zyl joined the Eastern Province Kings Academy, where he played for the Eastern Province U19 side in the 2010 Under-19 Provincial Championship. He was a key player for the Eastern Province U21 side in the 2012 Under-21 Provincial Championship, scoring 71 points in eight appearances. Van Zyl was under the Top SARU Performers, scoring the most tries at 6 in the 2012 Provincial Under 21 in the Rugby Junior Provincials.

This included a record and a remarkable personal haul in their opening match, when he scored 36 of his team's points in a 61–3 victory over Boland U21, consisting of four tries and eight conversions and was awarded Man of the Match.

== Eastern Province Kings ==
Van Zyl was included in Eastern Province Kings' senior squad for the 2013 Vodacom Cup, making his debut in a 17–13 victory in their Round Four match against Free State XV. He scored his first senior points against Sharks XV contributing seven points with the boot in a match that the Kings won 27–23. In their match against the Boland Cavaliers, he scored his first career try in a 27–23 win to help the EP Kings finish in third place on the log and qualify for the quarter-finals. He played in the quarter-final, kicking a conversion, and with a remarkable fight-back saw his side win 34–31 against the Vodacom Blue Bulls despite being 13–31 down with eight minutes left to play. Starting as Fullback in their semi-final match, he sustained a broken jaw early in the game while fielding a high ball which ended in a 13–39 loss to the Pumas in Nelspruit, .

Van Zyl played in the 2013 Currie Cup First Division making nine appearances, making his Currie Cup debut in their match against the SWD Eagles in George, kicking a conversion in the second-last minute to clinch a 35–34 victory for the Kings. Starting for Kings in their match against the Falcons in the penultimate round of the competition. the beat Falcons 30-23. In their semi-final match against the Leopards with the scores level at 22-all, an additional twenty minutes were played and Van Zyl scored a try six minutes later to help his team to a 32–29 victory to progress to the final. In the final against the Pumas, he again scored a late try in the 81st minute of the match.

In 2014, Van Zyl played Varsity Cup rugby with the NMMU Madibaz, and had to return to the Eastern Province Kings squad for the 2014 Vodacom Cup, kicking five points in their final Southern Section match against the previously-unbeaten Sharks XV to help the Kings to a 27–11 victory,

== Mogliano Rugby ==
In August 2014, Van Zyl moved to Italy to join National Championship of Excellence side Mogliano Rugby on a two-year contract. The first friendly match was against Petrarca in September, for the 2014–15 National Championship of Excellence. He played seventeen matches for Mogliano in the competition, starting sixteen matches as fullback and making one appearance off the bench. He contributed a total of 55 points (scoring eleven tries) and was named the Man of the Match after scoring two tries in their match against Lazio on 1 November 2014. Mogliano finished in third position in the regular season, winning eleven of their eighteen matches to qualify for the title play-off semi-finals. He scored two tries in a 24–23 victory in the second leg of their semi-final against Calvisano at their Peroni Stadium on 24 May 2015; however this was not enough, as Calvisano progressed to the final by winning 53–39 on aggregate.

Van Zyl was the joint-top try scorer with teammate Marco Filippucci in the 2014–2015 National Championship of Excellence, scoring eleven tries. He played 1310 minutes in the Super 10, 2014-2015 season.

== Zebre - Pro14 - European Rugby Challenge Cup ==
Van Zyl featured in the Pro14 and the European Rugby Challenge Cup competitions. He made his Pro14 debut in the 2015–16 season, contracted to Parma-based Zebre for two years. Van Zyl played 25 matches during the 2015–16 season, scoring six tries. He played in total 1825 minutes for the season. (1601 minutes in the Guinness Pro12, scoring five tries) and (224 minutes in the European Rugby Challenge Cup/Rabodirect, scoring one try).

Van Zyl is the second top try scorer for Zebre in Guinness Pro12 15/16 season scoring six tries. .

Van Zyl scored his first Pro14 try against Cardiff Blues, where Zebre claimed a 26–15 bonus point victory. He scored two tries in Round Nine against Ospreys, . He scored his first try in the European Rugby Challenge Cup in their 2015–16 European Rugby Challenge Cup match against Worcester Warriorsin a 22–15 victory for Zebre. He scored his fourth try against Glasgow Warriors in the 20th minute of their Round 21 match in Scotland. He scored his fifth try against Newport Gwent Dragons in Round 22, a match that ended in a 47–22 victory for Zebre to secure a place in the 2016–17 European Rugby Challenge Cup in which he suffered a debilitating hamstring injury in the final match of the season.

Pro12 2016–17 season Van Zyl fought his way back to fitness, playing 9 games, 466 minutes, starting 6 and scoring 2 tries for the season, making an immediate impact with his decisive running and excellent fielding under the high ball, scoring a try for Zebre against Benetton Rugby. He scored a second try in the Glasgow Warriors match, with teammate Kurt Baker scoring the second try in the match for Zebre. In a first-ever victory for Zebre over Connacht 25-22, he did superbly well in fielding a high kick with a try assist to centre Tommaso Boni who touched down in the left corner for Zebre. Van Zyl brilliantly saved a try against Zebre coming as cross cover in their match against Cardiff Blues in April 2017.

== Calvisano Rugby ==
He played with Calvisano in Top10 from 2018 to 2022−2023 season.

== Rugby Sevens ==
Rugby Sevens, Van Zyl was invited in true Team Barbarian style to participate in the Amsterdam Sevens 27 May 2017 alongside three of the current Kenya 7's to play for the Samurai International RFC. where they reached the semi-finals. The tournament was won by the Susies Exiles with 5 All Black players.

Van Zyl represented the ARTECH BSMI7 in Rome in the 16th edition of the 7 Rome Sevens Rugby Tournament, scoring three tries, where they were awarded the third place surpassing the Italian National (19-7) and Germany 7 S (28-19).

== Rugby San Donà ==
Van Zyl signs with Rugby San Donà di Piave, in the metropolitan city of Venice for the National Championship of Excellence. He scored his first try for Rugby San Donà in the opening match of the season. In the second match of the season, van Zyl scored 2 tries for Rugby San Donà. Lafert San Donà wins the Final of the Excellence Trophy for 24 to 0, signing a historical result in the record of the Rugby San Donà club and the first Trofeo won by South African trainer Ansell against Fiamme Oro Rugby. Van Zyl scored 2 tries for Rugby San Donà against Mogliano. and was awarded Man of the Match.

Van Zyl is the top try scorer with 7 tries and the 2nd top point scorer with 51 points for Rugby San Donà in the 2017/2018 season.

== National Italian Sevens ==
Van Zyl was included by Andy Vilk for the Italian 7's training squad held at Parma in January 2018. The Italian 7's competed against England and Ireland in Rome.

== Rugby Calvisano ==
Van Zyl signed with Rugby Calvisano for 2 years, which is based in Calvisano (Province of Brescia), in Lombardy, as fullback. Van Zyl scored his first two tries for Rugby Calvisano in the pre-season games. He scored his first try in the TOP12 for Patarò Calvisano in the second round against Medicei" and is awarded Man of the Match. Van Zyl scores 4th try in the 25th minute against SS Lazio. Van Zyl scores his 5th try in the 35 min for Calvisano against Argos Petrarca on 11 November 2018.

Van Zyl scored two exceptional tries for Kawasaki Robot Calvisano v Rugby Viadana 1970 and is awarded Man of the Match. Van Zyl has a great intercept scoring a try in the 25th minute for Rugby Calvisano against Flame Gold Rugby. He scored his 9th try in a 16-21 victory against Valorugby Emilia. Van Zyl scored 9 tries and was awarded twice Man of the Match for Kawasaki Robot Calvisano.

2019/2020 contract extends with Rugby Calvisano. Van Zyl scores his 1st try for the season for Rugby Calvisano vs Rugby Lyons, 22 December 2019 In the Peroni Top12. He scores a magnificent try for Rugby Calvisano in the 1st minute of the second half v Pau in EPCR Round 5.

2020/2021 Season. Van Zyl immediately scores with two tries in the 2nd and 20th minute in the opening pre-season match against Sitav Rugby Lyons He is awarded Player of the Match in Calvisano's first game of the championship against Fiamme Ore with a victory of 22-3.

2022/2023 Van Zyl scores in the 36th minute against Rugby Rovigo. Van Zyl scores with two tries in the 14th and 72nd minutes against Viadana.
