= David Bulbring =

South African rugby union player

- Full name: David James Bulbring
- Born: 12 September 1989 (age 37) Port Elizabeth
- Height: 1.98 m (6 ft 6 in)
- Weight: 113 kg (249 lb; 17 st 11 lb)
- School: Alexander Road High School
- University: University of Johannesburg

Rugby union career
- Position: Lock
Youth career
- 2007: Eastern Province Kings
- 2008–2010: Golden Lions
Amateur team(s)
Years	Team	Apps	(Points)
2010	UJ	3	(0)
Senior career
Years	Team	Apps	(Points)
2009–2011	Golden Lions	26	(20)
2010–2011	Lions	3	(0)
2012–2013 2014–2015	Eastern Province Kings	37	(5)
2013	Southern Kings	18	(0)
2013–2014	Blue Bulls	15	(15)
2016–2019	Scarlets	73	(0)
2020–2026	Kubota Spears	70	(35)
- Correct as of 21 February 2021
International career
Years	Team	Apps	(Points)
2009	South Africa Under-20	5	(0)
2012	South African Barbarians (South)	1	(0)
- Correct as of 21 February 2013

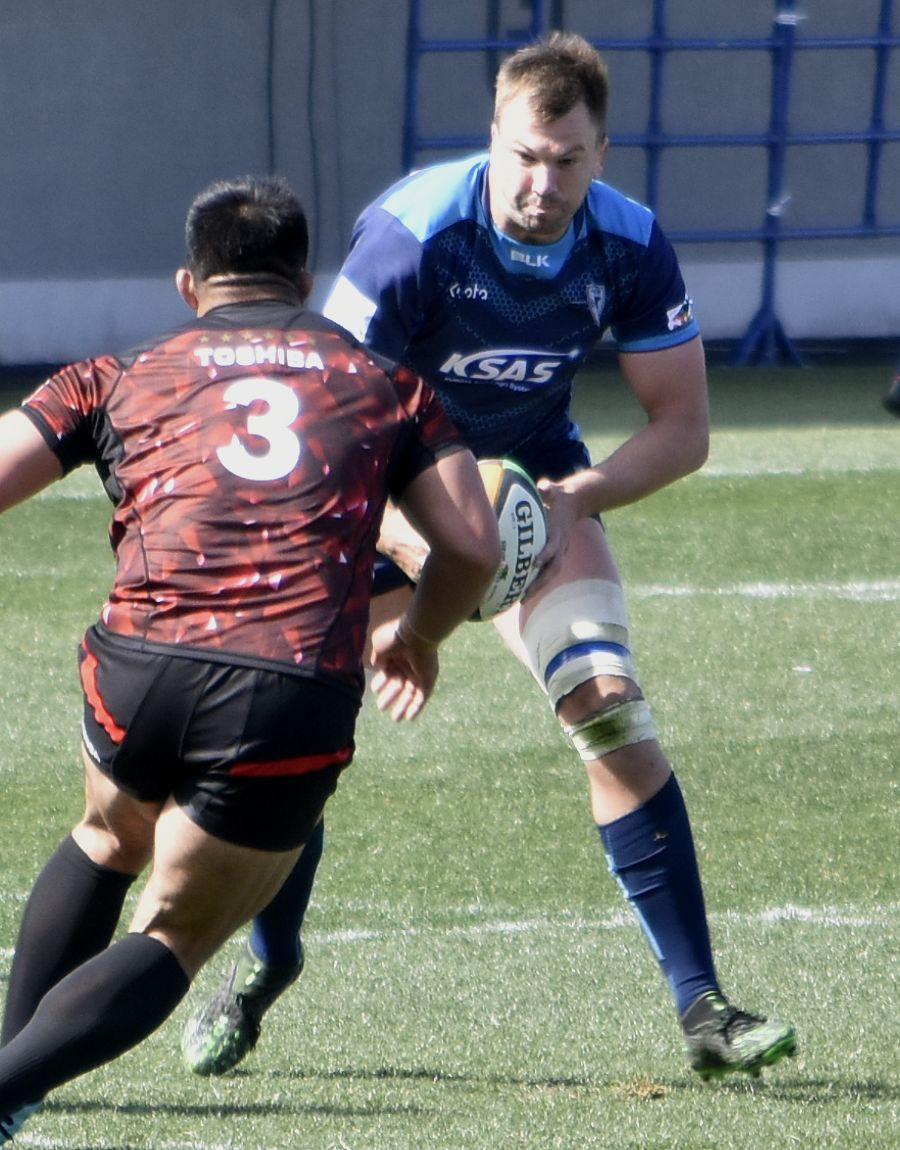

David James Bulbring (born 12 September 1989) is a South African professional rugby union player who has played as a lock for the Kubota Spears in Japan Rugby League One since 2020.

Bulbring previously played for several South African and European sides, including the Golden Lions, Lions, Eastern Province Kings, and the Southern Kings in Super Rugby. He later joined Welsh Pro14 side Scarlets, where he made over 70 appearances before moving to Japan.

== Career ==
=== Youth and Lions ===
He was born in Port Elizabeth and represented Eastern Province at the 2007 Under 18 Craven Week. He then joined the Golden Lions, making his debut for the team in the 2009 Vodacom Cup, which resulted in him being called up to the South Africa national under-20 rugby union team for the 2009 IRB Junior World Championship.

In 2010, he represented both UJ in the Varsity Cup and Golden Lions in the 2010 Vodacom Cup, culminating a call-up to the Lions Super Rugby team, representing them in their final Super Rugby game of the season against the Cheetahs. He then played for the Golden Lions in the 2010 Currie Cup Premier Division

He was Golden Lions captain for the 2011 Vodacom Cup competition and made two further Super Rugby appearances. He was then part of the squad that won the 2011 Currie Cup Premier Division.

=== Kings ===
In 2012, he moved to the Eastern Province Kings. He made seven appearances for them in the 2012 Vodacom Cup competition, as well as one against a South African Students side. He started all fourteen matches in the 2012 Currie Cup First Division season, as well as both matches in the promotion/relegation matches against the Free State Cheetahs.

He was named in the Southern Kings squad for the 2013 Super Rugby season. He made his debut in the Kings' historic first ever match against the Force, helping them to a 22–10 victory. He played in all sixteen matches during the season (being one of only three players to do so, Bandise Maku and Shaun Venter being the other two), as well as both the 2013 Super Rugby promotion/relegation matches against the Lions, making a total of thirteen starts and five substitute appearances.

=== Bulls ===
After the 2013 Super Rugby season, he joined the Blue Bulls, signing a contract at the team until October 2016.

=== Return to the Kings ===
After a year at the Blue Bulls, it was announced that he rejoined the Eastern Province Kings prior to the 2014 Currie Cup Premier Division season on a deal that would see him remain at the Port Elizabeth-based side until the end of 2016.

=== Scarlets ===
In February 2016, he joined Welsh Pro12 side Scarlets on a long-term deal until the summer of 2019.

=== Representative rugby ===
He was a member of the South Africa Under-20 team that played at the 2009 IRB Junior World Championship. He was named in a South African Barbarians (South) team that faced England during the 2012 mid-year rugby test series.
