= Steven Sykes =

South African rugby union player

- Full name: Steven Robert Sykes
- Born: 5 August 1984 (age 42) Middelburg, Eastern Cape, South Africa
- Height: 1.97 m (6 ft 5 1/2 in)
- Weight: 106 kg (234 lb; 16 st 10 lb)
- School: Marlow Agricultural High School, Cradock

Rugby union career
- Position: Lock
- Current team: Oyonnax
Youth career
- 2003–2005: Sharks
Senior career
Years	Team	Apps	(Points)
2005–2010	Sharks (Currie Cup)	80	(25)
2005–2008	Sharks XV	21	(0)
2006–2012	Sharks	69	(45)
2011	Leinster	4	(0)
2012	Sharks (Currie Cup)	8	(0)
2013	Southern Kings	15	(10)
2013–2015	Eastern Province Kings	20	(20)
2015	→ Cheetahs	14	(5)
2016	Southern Kings	13	(20)
2016–present	Oyonnax	48	(15)
- Correct as of 19 November 2019
International career
Years	Team	Apps	(Points)
2003	South Africa Under-19		
2009	Emerging Springboks	1	(0)
- Correct as of 21 February 2013

Steven Robert Sykes (born 5 August 1984 in Middelburg, Eastern Cape, South Africa) is a South African former rugby union player. He played for Oyonnax in the French Top 14. His regular position was lock.

== Career ==
=== Youth ===
While still at school, Sykes represented Eastern Province at various youth tournaments. He played for them at primary school level at the 1997 Under-13 Craven Week competition and progressed through the youth sides to the Under-18 Craven Week team in 2002.

=== Sharks / Sharks ===
In 2003, Sykes moved to Durban to join the Sharks academy. He was also selected in the South African Under-19 side that played at the Under 19 Rugby World Championship in 2003 and also represented the Sharks Under-20 side in the Under-20 Provincial Competition in 2003 and 2004.

He made his first class debut for the Natal Wildebeest (the name that the Sharks' Vodacom Cup side played under) during the 2005 Vodacom Cup competition, coming on as an early substitute in a 43–0 victory over the Border Bulldogs in Durban. He started their next match against the Pumas in Witbank and remained in the starting line-up for the remainder of the competition.

He made his Currie Cup debut during the Qualification Round of the 2005 Currie Cup, playing off the bench against the Mighty Elephants. The Sharks topped their section to qualify for the Premier Division. Sykes was once again involved, making his first Currie Cup start in the first match of the Premier Division and scoring a try after just 25 minutes to help the Sharks to a 55–17 victory over the Leopards, eventually making five appearances in the competition.

He remained involved in both the Vodacom Cup and Currie Cup side in 2006, making a total of 22 appearances and contributing one try in their match against Griquas.

In 2007, Sykes became involved in the Super Rugby side for the first time. He started their first three matches of the 2007 Super 14 season – after his debut against the Bulls in a 17–3 victory, he also played in their 22–9 victory over the Waratahs and the 23–16 win over the Highlanders, all three of those matches in Durban. However, Johan Ackermann returned for the remainder of the competition and Sykes made five starts for the Wildebeest in the 2007 Vodacom Cup. We made fourteen appearances (or which thirteen were starts) in the 2007 Currie Cup Premier Division, scoring tries against Griquas and the Blue Bulls.

He started off 2008 playing Vodacom Cup rugby and made three starts before being recalled to the squad for the 2008 Super 14 season. He made eight appearances for the side and also scored his first Super Rugby try in a 47–25 victory over New Zealand side the Chiefs. He remained a key player for them in the Currie Cup, making thirteen appearances during the 2008 Currie Cup Premier Division, helping the Sharks reach the final of the competition for the first time in 5 years. Steven Sykes played the first hour of the match as the Sharks ran out 14–9 winners against the Blue Bulls to win their first Currie Cup since 1996.

Now firmly established as a first-choice lock for the Sharks in Super Rugby, Sykes played in all thirteen of their matches during the 2009 Super 14 season, starting twelve of those. He also got his best ever points haul during a competition, scoring four tries – one each against the Blues, the Crusaders, the Highlanders and the Bulls.

The Super 14 season was followed by the 2009 British & Irish Lions tour to South Africa, with Sykes involved on three occasions. Firstly, he played for the Sharks against the British & Irish Lions in their fourth tour match. He also featured in a match between the Lions and an Emerging Springboks side, playing the first hour of a 13–13 draw in Cape Town. He was then called into the Springbok team for the third test, but he remained an unused substitute as the Lions ran out 28–9 winners. Fifteen appearances followed in the 2009 Currie Cup Premier Division as the Sharks failed to retain their title, losing to the Free State Cheetahs in the semi-final.

Sykes made a further thirteen appearances for the Sharks in the 2010 Super 14 season and sixteen appearances in the 2010 Currie Cup Premier Division, as they recaptured the title, beating Western Province 30–10 in the final in Durban.

A further fifteen appearances followed during the 2011 Super Rugby season, Sykes weighing in with tries against the Force and the Brumbies as they reached the play-offs before being eliminated by the Crusaders.

=== Leinster ===
After seven-and-a-half years in Durban, Sykes signed a three-year contract with Irish Pro12 and Heineken Cup side Leinster. However, he made just four appearances for the Dublin-based side before returning to South Africa.

=== Return to Sharks ===
He once returned to the Sharks, signing for them on a one-year contract. He continued where he left off, making seventeen appearances for them during the 2012 Super Rugby season – scoring two tries – and played in eight matches for the Sharks in the 2012 Currie Cup Premier Division.

=== Eastern Province Kings / Southern Kings (2013–14) ===
During the 2012 season, it was announced that he would join the Southern Kings for their first season of Super Rugby in 2013, returning to the region he originally came from on a two-year deal. He made his debut for the Southern Kings in their historic first-ever Super Rugby match, helping them to a 22–10 victory against the Force in Port Elizabeth. He scored one try for them in their 30–46 defeat to the Hurricanes in Wellington and made a total of thirteen appearances. He also played in both legs of the relegation play-off series against the Lions, scoring a try in the first match, but could not prevent the Kings losing the series 42–44 on aggregate to lose their Super Rugby status for 2014.

Domestically, he made six starts for the Eastern Province Kings during the 2013 Currie Cup First Division season, scoring tries against the Pumas, Boland Cavaliers and Border Bulldogs as the Kings reached the final of the competition, only to lose to the Pumas in Nelspruit.

The EP Kings were promoted to the Premier Division of the Currie Cup for 2014 following a decision by SARU to increase the division from six teams to eight. Sykes was one of a number of players rested for the duration of the 2014 Vodacom Cup in an attempt to get them to optimum conditioning for their Currie Cup campaign. However, this plan failed to work, with the Kings losing their first nine matches before winning their final match against fellow promoted side, the Pumas. Sykes made six starts in the competition before a knee injury ruled him out of the final stages of the competition.

=== Cheetahs ===
He was loaned to the Cheetahs for the 2015 Super Rugby season. He was mainly used as a replacement for the first-choice lock pairing of Francois Uys and Carl Wegner, playing off the bench on no less than eleven occasions during the season, but he did start in three matches against New Zealand opposition – against the Crusaders, and the Chiefs during their tour of New Zealand and against the Highlanders in Bloemfontein. Sykes scored a try in their 42–29 victory over the Bulls in Pretoria in their final match of the season, but could not prevent the Cheetahs finish bottom of the South African Conference and 12th overall.

=== Eastern Province Kings / Southern Kings (2015–) ===
He returned to the Eastern Province Kings for their 2015 Currie Cup Premier Division campaign. He made eight starts during the competition and scored a try in their Round Two match against his former side, the Sharks. He helped his side improve on their 2014 record, winning two matches and finishing the season in seventh position.

As a result of the Eastern Province Kings' financial situation, all of their players were free to cancel their contracts and join other teams. However, Sykes was one of the first batch of twenty players that signed a contract to play Super Rugby in 2016 for a Southern Kings team whose operations were taken over by the South African Rugby Union.

=== Oyonnax ===
During the 2016 Super Rugby season, French side Oyonnax announced that Sykes would join them for the 2016–17 season.

== Honours ==
=== Sharks ===
- Currie Cup winner: 2008, 2010

=== Sharks ===
- Super 14 runner-up: 2007
