= 2012 France rugby union tour of Argentina =

- Coach: Philippe Saint-André
- Tour captain: Pascal Papé
- Top point scorer: Frédéric Michalak (38)
- Top try scorer(s): Yoann Huget (2); Geoffrey Doumayrou (2)
- Top test point scorer: Frédéric Michalak (19)
- Top test try scorer: Yoann Huget (2)
Summary
P	W	D	L
Total
3	2	0	1
Test match
2	1	0	1
Opponent
P	W	D	L
Argentina
1	1	0	1

Tour chronology
- ← South Africa & Argentina 2010 New Zealand 2013 →

In June 2012, France toured Argentina to play two Tests against the Pumas. The French tour was one in a series of tours by northern teams to be hosted by southern hemisphere nations.

The previous French tour of Argentina took place in 2010 as part of a global Two Test tour of South Africa and Argentina, where France lost to both nations. France's last winning tour of Argentina dated back to 1998 when the touring side claimed victory in both Tests. Since then France had an overall losing record against Argentina with 5 wins (4 at home and 1 in Ireland in the 1999 Rugby World Cup) and 7 losses (3 at home including two in the 2007 Rugby World Cup and 4 in Argentina).

No mid-week fixture had been planned for this tour, however most of the French squad, styled for the occasion as the "XV du Président", played a warm-up fixture against a team hand-picked by Serge Betsen, a former France international, for his jubilee.

The series was drawn 1-1, Argentina winning the first test and France the second.

Argentina and France's next encounter took place on 17 November 2012 on French soil as part of the 2012 end of year tests. France claimed another victory (39-22) against their old foes.

== Background ==
Argentina experienced a strong start in the 2011 Rugby World Cup with a rather successful pool stage, finishing runners-up to England with three wins (over Georgia, Romania and Scotland) and a narrow loss to England (9-13). However, the Pumas were unable to capitalise on it when they met future World Champions the All Blacks in the quarter-finals, losing 33-10.

France, on the other hand, experienced a rather slow start in the competition with two wins (over Japan and Canada) and two losses (to New Zealand and Tonga), finishing runners-up to New Zealand on the virtue of a greater tally of bonus points than Tonga (who also finished with two wins and two losses). However, France produced a stronger showing in the knock-out stages, beating England in the quarter-finals (19-12), Wales in the semi-finals (9-8) and losing with the narrowest of margins to New Zealand in the final (8-7).

Due to the World Cup neither team played any Test in the 2011 end of year tests. On 2 January 2012 France was ranked 3rd in the IRB World Rankings while Argentina stood in the 7th place.

France experienced a disappointing 2012 Six Nations Championship with two wins (over Italy and Scotland), two losses (to England and Wales) and a draw (with Ireland), finishing 4th overall.

As a result on 2 April France had dropped to the 6th place in the IRB Rankings while Argentina remained on the 7th spot.

As part of Italy's Summer Tour of Americas and prior to the arrival of the French team, Argentina played a Test against Italy on Saturday 9 June in San Juan. Argentina won the game 37-22.

Before the first test between France and Argentina they remained respectively on the 6th and 7th spot in the IRB Rankings.

== Warm-up fixture ==
6 June 2012
20:15 CET (UTC+2)

Serge Betsen's XV	14 - 54	XV du Président
Try: Traille; Mehrtens; Con: Mehrtens (2)	Report	Try: Huget; Lauret; Doumayrou (2); Michalak; Lakafia; Ouedraogo; Héguy; Con: Michalak (7)

Parc des sports d'Aguilera, Biarritz
Referee: TBC (France)

Serge Betsen's XV
FB	15	(France) Pepito Elhorga
RW	14	(France) Dave Vainqueur
OC	13	(France) Romain Cabannes
IC	12	(France) Damien Traille
LW	11	(France) Jean-Baptiste Gobelet
FH	10	(New Zealand) Andrew Mehrtens
SH	9	(New Zealand) Byron Kelleher
N8	8	(New Zealand) Chris Masoe
OF	7	(France) Jean Monribot
BF	6	(France) Serge Betsen (c)
RL	5	(Cameroon) Gambo Adamou
LL	4	(Russia) Kirill Kulemin
TP	3	(England) Tim Payne
HK	2	(France) Benoît August
LP	1	(France) Benoît Lecouls
Replacements:
HK	16	(France) Benjamin Noirot
PR	17	(France) Jérémy Castex
PR	18	(France) Fabien Barcella
LK	19	(Cameroon) Bernard N'Nomo
FL	20	(South Africa) Oscar Limani
UB	21	(France) Benjamin Dambielle
UB	22	(Australia) Paul Warwick
UB	23	(France) Julien Laharrague
WG	24	(France) Marvin O'Connor
Coach:
(England) David Ellis

XV du Président
FB	15	Brice Dulin
RW	14	Yoann Huget
OC	13	Geoffrey Doumayrou
IC	12	Maxime Mermoz
LW	11	Benjamin Fall
FH	10	Frédéric Michalak
SH	9	Maxime Machenaud
N8	8	Raphaël Lakafia
OF	7	Fulgence Ouedraogo
BF	6	Wenceslas Lauret
RL	5	Romain Taofifenua
LL	4	Pascal Papé (c)
TP	3	David Attoub
HK	2	Dimitri Szarzewski
LP	1	Yvan Watremez
Replacements:
HK	16	Arnaud Héguy
PR	17	Antoine Guillamon
PR	18	Yannick Forestier
LK	19	Alexandre Flanquart
N8	20	Damien Chouly
SH	21	Florian Cazenave
FH	22	François Trinh-Duc
CE	23	Henry Chavancy
WG	24	Romain Martial
Coach:
(France) Philippe Saint-André

Touch judges:
(France) TBC
(France) TBC
Television match official:
TBC

- 6 players from the XV du Président (all among the replacements) were not originally included in the French squad that toured Argentina. Arnaud Héguy, Yannick Forestier, Alexandre Flanquart, Damien Chouly, Florian Cazenave and Henry Chavancy respectively replaced Christopher Tolofua, Vincent Debaty, Yoann Maestri and Christophe Samson, Louis Picamoles, Morgan Parra and Wesley Fofana and Florian Fritz, on club duty for the Top 14 playoffs. (Jean-Marcellin Buttin was also on club duty but no additional player was called to replace him as Brice Dulin filled the full-back position.)

== Test Matches ==
=== First Test ===
16 June 2012
18:10 ART (UTC-03)

Argentina	23–20	France
Try: Agulla 4' c Montero 76' c Con: Contepomi (2/2) 5', 77'; Pen: Contepomi (3/6) 24', 39', 56'	Report	Try: Picamoles 26' m Con: Parra (0/1); Pen: Parra (4/5) 3', 10', 22', 43'; Trinh-Duc (1/1) 52'

Estadio Mario Alberto Kempes, Córdoba
Attendance: 20,000
Referee: George Clancy (Ireland)

Team details

Argentina
France

Argentina
FB	15	Román Miralles		(substituted off) 40'
RW	14	Belisario Agulla
OC	13	Joaquín Tuculet
IC	12	Felipe Contepomi (c)
LW	11	Manuel Montero
FH	10	Ignacio Mieres
SH	9	Martín Landajo		(substituted off) 48'
N8	8	Tomás Leonardi	(yellow card) 51' to 61'
OF	7	Tomás de la Vega
BF	6	Julio Farías Cabello
RL	5	Esteban Lozada		(substituted off) 56'
LL	4	Benjamín Macome		(substituted off) 65'
TP	3	Nahuel Tetaz Chaparro		(substituted off) 56'
HK	2	Bruno Postiglioni		(substituted off) 56'
LP	1	Eusebio Guiñazú
Replacements:
HK	16	Andrés Bordoy		(substituted in) 56'
PR	17	Pablo Henn		(substituted in) 56'
LK	18	Rodrigo Bruno		(substituted in) 65'
LK	19	Rodrigo Báez		(substituted in) 56'
SH	20	Tomás Cubelli		(substituted in) 48'
FB	21	Benjamín Urdapilleta		(substituted in) 40'
WG	22	Facundo Barrea
Coach:
(Argentina) Santiago Phelan

France
FB	15	Brice Dulin
RW	14	Jean-Marcellin Buttin
OC	13	Wesley Fofana
IC	12	Florian Fritz	(substituted off) 78'
LW	11	Yoann Huget
FH	10	François Trinh-Duc	(substituted off) 58'
SH	9	Morgan Parra
N8	8	Louis Picamoles	(substituted off) 66'
OF	7	Fulgence Ouedraogo
BF	6	Wenceslas Lauret
RL	5	Yoann Maestri	(substituted off) 74'
LL	4	Pascal Papé (c)
TP	3	David Attoub
HK	2	Dimitri Szarzewski	(substituted off) 66'
LP	1	Yvan Watremez	(substituted off) 40'
Replacements:
HK	16	Christopher Tolofua	(substituted in) 66'
PR	17	Vincent Debaty	(substituted in) 40'
LK	18	Romain Taofifenua	(substituted in) 74'
FL	19	Alexandre Lapandry	(substituted in) 66'
SH	20	Maxime Machenaud
FH	21	Frédéric Michalak	(substituted in) 58'
CE	22	Maxime Mermoz	(substituted in) 78'
Coach:
(France) Philippe Saint-André

Touch judges:
(England) Wayne Barnes
(South Africa) Christie du Preez
Television match official:
(South Africa) Shaun Veldsman

- Brice Dulin, Romain Taofifenua, Christopher Tolofua and Yvan Watremez made their full international debuts for France in this match.
- Rodrigo Baez made his full international debut for Argentina in this match.
- With this match Argentina extended their winning streak at home against France to 5 games and 10 years and overcame them in the IRB Rankings (swapping their 7th place with France's 6th).

=== Second Test ===
23 June 2012
18:10 ART (UTC-03)

Argentina	10–49	France
Try: Vega 74' c Con: Contepomi 1/1 74'; Pen: Contepomi 1/1 25'	Report	Try: Fall 11' c Huget (2) 33' c, 62' m Machenaud 39' c Mermoz 55' c Lapandry; Con: Michalak 5/6 12', 33', 40', 56', 68'; Pen: Michalak 3/3 17', 27', 30'

Estadio José Fierro, Tucumán
Referee: George Clancy (Ireland)

Team details

Argentina
France

Argentina
FB	15	Joaquín Tuculet	(substituted off) 40'
RW	14	Facundo Barrea
OC	13	Agustín Gosio
IC	12	Felipe Contepomi (c)
LW	11	Manuel Montero
FH	10	Benjamín Urdapilleta
SH	9	Tomás Cubelli
N8	8	Leonardo Senatore	(substituted off) 58'
OF	7	Tomás Leonardi
BF	6	Tomás de la Vega
RL	5	Esteban Lozada
LL	4	Julio Farías Cabello	(substituted off) 27'
TP	3	Francisco Gómez Kodela
HK	2	Andrés Bordoy	(substituted off) 55'
LP	1	Eusebio Guiñazú
Replacements:
PR	16	Nahuel Tetaz Chaparro
HK	17	Bruno Postiglioni	(substituted in) 55'
LK	18	Santiago Guzmán
LK	19	Benjamin Macome	(substituted in) 27'
FL	20	Rodrigo Báez	(substituted in) 58'
SH	21	Martín Landajo
CE	22	Gabriel Ascarate	(substituted in) 40'
Coach:
(Argentina) Santiago Phelan

France
FB	15	Brice Dulin
RW	14	Benjamin Fall	(substituted off) 58'
OC	13	Florian Fritz
IC	12	Maxime Mermoz
LW	11	Yoann Huget
FH	10	Frédéric Michalak	(substituted off) 69'
SH	9	Maxime Machenaud	(substituted off) 69'
N8	8	Louis Picamoles	(substituted off) 64'
OF	7	Fulgence Ouedraogo
BF	6	Alexandre Lapandry	(substituted off) 79'
RL	5	Pascal Papé (c)
LL	4	Yoann Maestri	(substituted off) 47'
TP	3	David Attoub	(substituted off) 47'
HK	2	Dimitri Szarzewski	(substituted off) 56'	(substituted in) 79'
LP	1	Vincent Debaty
Replacements:
HK	16	Christopher Tolofua	(substituted in) 56'	(yellow card) 72' to 80'
PR	17	Thomas Domingo	(substituted in) 47'
LK	18	Christophe Samson	(substituted in) 47'
FL	19	Wenceslas Lauret	(substituted in) 64'
SH	20	Morgan Parra	(substituted in) 69'
FH	21	François Trinh-Duc	(substituted in) 69'
CE	22	Wesley Fofana	(substituted in) 58'
Coach:
(France) Philippe Saint-André

Touch judges:
(England) Wayne Barnes
(South Africa) Christie du Preez
Television match official:
(South Africa) Shaun Veldsman

- Facundo Barrea made his full international debut for Argentina in this match.
- Maxime Machenaud and Christophe Samson made their full international debuts for France in this match.
- France won the Series, tied 1-1, on points difference (69-33).
- With this victory France ended a 14-year timespan without a win against the Pumas on Argentinian soil, the previous victorious Test dating back to 28 June 1998, and once again overcame Argentina in the IRB Rankings.

== Touring squad ==
Philippe Saint-André announced his 28-man France squad for the June tour to Argentina. Several key faces were rested, including captain Thierry Dusautoir.

- Caps updated before the June tour. Ages are as of the first Test on 16 June.

Head coach: Philippe Saint-André

Note: Flags indicate national union for the club/province as defined by World Rugby.

Player	Position	Date of birth (age)	Caps	Club/province
Dimitri Szarzewski	Hooker	26 January 1983 (aged 29)	61	(France) Stade Français
Christopher Tolofua	Hooker	31 December 1993 (aged 18)	0	(France) Toulouse
David Attoub	Prop	7 June 1981 (aged 31)	2	(France) Stade Français
Vincent Debaty	Prop	2 October 1981 (aged 30)	6	(France) Clermont
Thomas Domingo*	Prop	20 August 1985 (aged 26)	17	(France) Clermont
Antoine Guillamon	Prop	4 June 1991 (aged 21)	0**	(France) Lyon
Yvan Watremez*	Prop	21 April 1989 (aged 23)	0	(France) Biarritz
Yoann Maestri	Lock	14 January 1988 (aged 24)	5	(France) Toulouse
Pascal Papé (c)	Lock	5 October 1980 (aged 31)	40	(France) Stade Français
Christophe Samson	Lock	1 March 1984 (aged 28)	0	(France) Toulon
Romain Taofifenua	Lock	14 September 1990 (aged 21)	0	(France) Perpignan
Alexandre Lapandry	Flanker	13 April 1989 (aged 23)	6	(France) Clermont
Wenceslas Lauret	Flanker	28 March 1989 (aged 23)	1	(France) Biarritz
Fulgence Ouedraogo	Flanker	21 July 1986 (aged 25)	25	(France) Montpellier
Raphaël Lakafia	Number 8	28 October 1988 (aged 23)	3	(France) Biarritz
Louis Picamoles	Number 8	5 February 1986 (aged 26)	26	(France) Toulouse
Maxime Machenaud	Scrum-half	30 December 1988 (aged 23)	0	(France) Agen
Morgan Parra	Scrum-half	15 November 1988 (aged 23)	41	(France) Clermont
Frédéric Michalak	Fly-half	16 October 1982 (aged 29)	54	(South Africa) Sharks
François Trinh-Duc	Fly-half	11 November 1986 (aged 25)	40	(France) Montpellier
Geoffrey Doumayrou	Centre	16 September 1989 (aged 22)	0**	(France) Montpellier
Wesley Fofana	Centre	20 January 1988 (aged 24)	5	(France) Clermont
Florian Fritz	Centre	17 January 1984 (aged 28)	20	(France) Toulouse
Maxime Mermoz	Centre	28 July 1986 (aged 25)	17	(France) Perpignan
Benjamin Fall	Wing	3 March 1989 (aged 23)	2	(France) Racing Métro
Yoann Huget	Wing	2 June 1987 (aged 25)	7	(France) Bayonne
Romain Martial	Wing	13 November 1984 (aged 27)	0**	(France) Castres
Jean-Marcellin Buttin	Fullback	16 December 1991 (aged 20)	1	(France) Clermont
Brice Dulin	Fullback	23 April 1990 (aged 22)	0	(France) Agen

Note*: After he sustained an injury in the First Test, Yvan Watremez was replaced in the squad by Thomas Domingo. (Philippe Saint-André originally planned to call up Castres prop Yannick Forestier but the latter was touring Japan with the French Barbarians and no satisfactory travel arrangement could be made, hence prompting the return of Domingo in the French squad after he sustained an important injury prior to the 2011 Rugby World Cup which prevented him from taking part in the competition and playing the major part of the 2011-2012 season with his club.)

Note**: Although they took part in the warm-up fixture, Geoffrey Doumayrou, Antoine Guillamon and Romain Martial failed to appear in any of the Tests, thus remaining uncapped at the end of the Tour.

=== Coaching and Management Team ===
Position	Name	Nationality
Head coach	Philippe Saint-André	France
Forwards Coach	Yannick Bru	France
Backs & Defence Coach	Patrice Lagisquet	France

== Home squad ==
Argentina's 29-man squad named for the 2012 June Tests against Italy and France. Coach Santiago Phelan decided not to select any player involved in the Top 14 playoffs, reserving his best squad for the upcoming 2012 Rugby Championship. Esteban Lozada was a late addition to the squad after his recovery from injury.

Head coach: Santiago Phelan

- Caps updated before tour. Ages are as of the first Test on 16 June.

Note: Flags indicate national union for the club/province as defined by World Rugby.

Player	Position	Date of birth (age)	Caps	Club/province
Andrés Bordoy	Hooker	30 December 1982 (aged 29)	3	(France) Pau
Eusebio Guiñazú	Hooker	15 January 1982 (aged 30)	8	(France) Biarritz
Francisco Gómez Kodela	Prop	3 July 1985 (aged 26)	3	(France) Biarritz
Pablo Henn	Prop	15 July 1982 (aged 29)	2	(France) Brive
Bruno Postiglioni	Prop	8 April 1987 (aged 25)	0	(Argentina) La Plata
Rodrigo Roncero	Prop	16 February 1977 (aged 35)	44	(France) Stade Français
Nahuel Tetaz Chaparro	Prop	11 June 1989 (aged 23)	3	(France) Stade Français
Rodrigo Bruno	Lock	15 May 1987 (aged 25)	2	(Argentina) Villa Maria
Santiago Guzmán	Lock	11 January 1989 (aged 23)	5	(Argentina) Tucumán
Esteban Lozada	Lock	8 January 1982 (aged 30)	17	(Scotland) Edinburgh
Benjamin Macome	Lock	10 January 1986 (aged 26)	3	(Argentina) Tucumán
Rodrigo Báez	Flanker	8 February 1989 (aged 23)	0	(Argentina) Liceo
Tomás de la Vega	Flanker	28 September 1990 (aged 21)	3	(Argentina) CUBA
Julio Farías Cabello	Flanker	19 September 1978 (aged 33)	8	(Argentina) Tucumán
Genaro Fessia	Flanker	22 July 1981 (aged 30)	11	(Argentina) Córdoba
Tomás Cristian Leonardi	Number 8	1 July 1987 (aged 24)	6	(Argentina) SIC
Leonardo Senatore	Number 8	13 May 1984 (aged 28)	3	(France) Toulon
Tomás Cubelli	Scrum-half	12 June 1989 (aged 23)	0	(Argentina) Belgrano
Martín Landajo	Scrum-half	14 June 1988 (aged 24)	6	(Argentina) CASI
Felipe Contepomi (c)	Fly-half	20 August 1977 (aged 34)	65	(France) Stade Français
Ignacio Mieres	Fly-half	6 April 1987 (aged 25)	0	(England) Exeter Chiefs
Gabriel Ascarate	Centre	20 August 1987 (aged 24)	3	(Argentina) Natación
Matias Orlando	Centre	14 November 1991 (aged 20)	0*	(Argentina) Huirapuca
Benjamín Urdapilleta	Centre	11 March 1986 (aged 26)	2	(England) Harlequins
Belisario Agulla	Wing	23 May 1988 (aged 24)	5	(France) Agen
Facundo Barrea	Wing	10 March 1989 (aged 23)	0	(Argentina) Córdoba
Agustín Gosio	Wing	17 March 1983 (aged 29)	2	(England) London Scottish
Manuel Montero	Wing	20 November 1991 (aged 20)	0	(Argentina) Pucara
Roman Miralles	Fullback	1 August 1983 (aged 28)	4	(Argentina) Duendes
Joaquín Tuculet	Fullback	1 August 1989 (aged 22)	0	(England) Sale Sharks

Note*: Matias Orlando failed to appear in any of the Tests against both Italy and France, thus remaining uncapped at the end of the Tour.

=== Coaching and Management Team ===
Position	Name	Nationality
Head coach	Santiago Phelan	Argentina
Assistant coach	Fabián Turnes	Argentina
Backs Coach	Martín Gaitán	Argentina
Forwards and Scrum Coach	Mauricio Reggiardo	Argentina

== Aftermath ==
On 25 June 2012 (after all mid-year Tests had been played) France stood at the 5th place (their best ranking since March 2012) in the IRB Rankings (thanks to their second test comprehensive victory over the Pumas and Wales' loss to Australia in their third test) while Argentina had dropped to the 8th spot (their worst ranking since March 2012).

From August to October 2012, Argentina competed in the inaugural Rugby Championship (the new incarnation of the Tri Nations Series) with Australia, New Zealand and South Africa, finishing bottom of the table with a draw (at home against the Springboks) and five losses. On 8 October 2012 France and Argentina remained respectively at the 5th and 8th places of the IRB World ranking.

As part of the 2012 end of year tests the Pumas toured Wales, France and Ireland, playing one Test against each union. They beat the Welsh but lost to the two other unions while France recorded three straight wins (against Australia, Argentina and Samoa). At the end of their Tests France had climbed to the IRB rankings 4th place, their best ranking since February 2012, while Argentina had dropped to the 9th place, their worst ranking since September 2011. However following the fourth week of Tests (of which Argentina and France were not part) Argentina climbed back to the 8th place thanks to Wales' defeat by Australia over the weekend.

As a result on December 3 for the 2015 Rugby World Cup Pool Draw France was drawn in Pot 1 while Argentina was drawn in Pot 2 and they ended up in Pool D and C respectively, meaning they will not meet before the Quarter Finals.

From February to March 2013, France competed in the Six Nations Championship (the 14th series following this format) with England, Ireland, Scotland, Italy and Wales, finishing bottom of the table with one win (at home against Scotland), a draw (in Ireland) and three losses (at home to Wales, in England and Italy). On 18 March 2013 France has dropped to the 6th place in the IRB rankings while Argentina remained on the 8th place.

As part of the 2013 mid-year tests, France will tour New Zealand in a Three-Test Series while Argentina will host England in a Two-Test Series and Georgia for a one-off Test.

== See also ==
- 2012 mid-year rugby test series
