= 2011 Vodacom Cup =

South African rugby union competition

- Countries: South Africa; Namibia; Argentina
- Date: 25 February – 13 May 2011
- Champions: Pampas XV (1st title)
- Runners-up: Blue Bulls
- Matches played: 71
- Tries scored: 510 (average 7.2 per match)
- Top point scorer: Lionel Cronjé (95)
- Top try scorer: JJ Engelbrecht / Juan Imhoff (10)

The 2011 Vodacom Cup was contested from 25 February to 13 May 2011. The tournament was the 14th edition of the Vodacom Cup, an annual domestic South African rugby union competition, and was played between the fourteen provincial teams in South Africa, as well as Namibian side Welwitschias and Argentine side Pampas XV.

The tournament was won by Pampas XV for the first time; they beat the Blue Bulls 14–9 in the final played on 13 May 2011.

== Competition rules and information ==
Sixteen teams participated in the 2011 Vodacom Cup competition. These teams were geographically divided into two sections, with eight teams in each of the Northern and Southern Sections. Teams played all the teams in the other section once over the course of the season, either at home or away.

Teams received four log points for a win and two points for a draw. Bonus log points were awarded to teams that scored four or more tries in a game, as well as to teams that lost a match by seven points or less. Teams were ranked by log points, then points difference (points scored less points conceded).

The top four teams in each section qualified for the title play-offs. In the quarter-finals, the teams that finished first in each section had home advantage against the teams that finished fourth in that section and the teams that finished second in each section had home advantage against the teams that finished third in that section. The winners of these quarter finals then played each other in the semi-finals, with the higher-placed team having home advantage. The two semi-final winners then met in the final.

== Teams ==
Location of teams in the 2011 Vodacom Cup
Northern Section
Southern Section

=== Changes from 2010 ===
- Eastern Province was renamed Eastern Province Kings.

=== Team Listing ===
The following teams took part in the 2011 Vodacom Cup competition:

2011 Vodacom Cup teams
| Team | Sponsored Name | Stadium/s | Sponsored Name |
Northern Section teams
| Blue Bulls | Vodacom Blue Bulls | Loftus Versfeld, Pretoria | Loftus Versfeld |
| Blue Bulls | Vodacom Blue Bulls | Police Fields, Pretoria | Police Fields |
| Falcons | Falcons | Barnard Stadium, Kempton Park | Barnard Stadium |
| Falcons | Falcons | Isak Steyl Stadium, Vanderbijlpark | Isak Steyl Stadium |
| Golden Lions | MTN Golden Lions | Ellis Park Stadium, Johannesburg | Coca-Cola Park |
| Golden Lions | MTN Golden Lions | Wits Rugby Stadium, Johannesburg | Wits Rugby Stadium |
| Griquas | GWK Griquas | Griqua Park, Kimberley | GWK Park |
| Griquas | GWK Griquas | Diamantveld High School, Kimberley | Diamantveld High School |
| Griffons | Tasol Solar Griffons | North West Stadium, Welkom | North West Stadium |
| Leopards | Leopards | Olën Park, Potchefstroom | Profert Olën Park |
| Leopards | Leopards | Wouter de Vos Stadium, Mafikeng | Wouter de Vos Stadium |
| Pumas | Ford Pumas | Puma Stadium, Witbank | Puma Stadium |
| Pumas | Ford Pumas | Mbombela Stadium, Mbombela | Mbombela Stadium |
| Pumas | Ford Pumas | Ermelo High School, Ermelo | Ermelo High School |
| Welwitschias | Welwitschias | Hage Geingob Stadium, Windhoek | Hage Geingob Stadium |
Southern Section teams
| Boland Cavaliers | Boland Cavaliers | Boland Stadium, Wellington | Boland Stadium |
| Boland Cavaliers | Boland Cavaliers | Glaskasteel, Bredasdorp | Glaskasteel |
| Boland Cavaliers | Boland Cavaliers | Moorreesburg Stadium, Moorreesburg | Moorreesburg Stadium |
| Border Bulldogs | Border Bulldogs | Buffalo City Stadium, East London | Buffalo City Stadium |
| Eastern Province Kings | Eastern Province Kings | Nelson Mandela Bay Stadium, Port Elizabeth | Nelson Mandela Bay Stadium |
| Eastern Province Kings | Eastern Province Kings | Grey High School, Port Elizabeth | Grey High School |
| Free State Cheetahs | Toyota Free State Cheetahs | Free State Stadium, Bloemfontein | Free State Stadium |
| Free State Cheetahs | Toyota Free State Cheetahs | Shimla Park, Bloemfontein | Shimla Park |
| Free State Cheetahs | Toyota Free State Cheetahs | Clive Solomon Stadium, Heidedal | Clive Solomon Stadium |
| Pampas XV | Pampas XV | Fanie du Toit Sport Ground, Potchefstroom | Fanie du Toit Stadium |
| Pampas XV | Pampas XV | Olën Park, Potchefstroom | Profert Olën Park |
| Sharks XV | Sharks XV | Kings Park Stadium, Durban | Mr Price Kings Park |
| Sharks XV | Sharks XV | Ugu Sports Grounds, Margate | Ugu Sports Grounds |
| Sharks XV | Sharks XV | Mick Kelly Park, Empangeni | Mick Kelly Park |
| SWD Eagles | SWD Eagles | Outeniqua Park, George | Outeniqua Park |
| SWD Eagles | SWD Eagles | Loerie Park, Knysna | Loerie Park |
| Western Province | DHL Western Province | Newlands Stadium, Cape Town | DHL Newlands |

== Tables ==
=== Northern Section ===
2011 Vodacom Cup Northern Section log
| Pos | Team | Pld | W | D | L | PF | PA | PD | TF | TA | TB | LB | Pts |
|---|---|---|---|---|---|---|---|---|---|---|---|---|---|
| 1 | Golden Lions | 8 | 6 | 1 | 1 | 219 | 120 | +99 | 25 | 15 | 4 | 1 | 31 |
| 2 | Griquas | 8 | 5 | 0 | 3 | 275 | 148 | +127 | 38 | 13 | 4 | 2 | 26 |
| 3 | Pumas | 8 | 4 | 0 | 4 | 239 | 217 | +22 | 26 | 21 | 2 | 1 | 19 |
| 4 | Blue Bulls | 8 | 3 | 0 | 5 | 197 | 175 | +22 | 26 | 20 | 2 | 3 | 17 |
| 5 | Griffons | 8 | 1 | 0 | 7 | 197 | 356 | −159 | 25 | 52 | 5 | 3 | 12 |
| 6 | Falcons | 8 | 2 | 1 | 5 | 175 | 382 | −207 | 24 | 59 | 2 | 0 | 12 |
| 7 | Leopards | 8 | 2 | 0 | 6 | 176 | 243 | −67 | 24 | 30 | 2 | 1 | 11 |
| 8 | Welwitschias | 8 | 0 | 1 | 7 | 129 | 334 | −205 | 16 | 52 | 2 | 1 | 5 |

=== Southern Section ===
2011 Vodacom Cup Southern Section log
| Pos | Team | Pld | W | D | L | PF | PA | PD | TF | TA | TB | LB | Pts |
|---|---|---|---|---|---|---|---|---|---|---|---|---|---|
| 1 | Pampas XV | 8 | 8 | 0 | 0 | 319 | 154 | +165 | 41 | 18 | 5 | 0 | 37 |
| 2 | Western Province | 8 | 7 | 1 | 0 | 312 | 97 | +215 | 40 | 12 | 3 | 0 | 33 |
| 3 | Sharks XV | 8 | 6 | 0 | 2 | 283 | 137 | +146 | 37 | 13 | 5 | 1 | 30 |
| 4 | Free State Cheetahs | 8 | 4 | 0 | 4 | 252 | 224 | +28 | 31 | 27 | 5 | 1 | 22 |
| 5 | Eastern Province Kings | 8 | 6 | 0 | 2 | 261 | 144 | +117 | 35 | 17 | 4 | 2 | 21 (Note: Eastern Province Kings were deducted nine points for fielding ineligible players in two games.) |
| 6 | Boland Cavaliers | 8 | 3 | 1 | 4 | 249 | 229 | +20 | 36 | 30 | 4 | 1 | 19 |
| 7 | SWD Eagles | 8 | 3 | 0 | 5 | 174 | 273 | −99 | 26 | 36 | 4 | 1 | 17 |
| 8 | Border Bulldogs | 8 | 1 | 1 | 6 | 125 | 349 | −224 | 16 | 51 | 0 | 1 | 7 |

Notes:

Legend and competition rules
Legend:
| Top four sides, qualify to quarter-finals. | P = Games played, W = Games won, D = Games drawn, L = Games lost, PF = Points for, PA = Points against, PD = Points difference, TF = Tries for, TA = Tries against, TB = Try bonus points, LB = Losing bonus points, Pts = Log points |
Competition rules:
Qualification: The top four teams in each section will qualify to the quarter-finals, with their final log positions determining their seedings in the quarter finals. In the quarter finals, the teams that finish first in each section will have home advantage against the teams that finish fourth in the other section and the teams that finish second in each section will have home advantage against the teams that finish third in the other section. The winners of these quarter finals will then play each other in the semi-finals, with the higher-placed team having home advantage. The two semi-final winners will then meet in the final. Points breakdown: * 4 points for a win * 2 points for a draw * 1 bonus point for a loss by seven points or less * 1 bonus point for scoring four or more tries in a match Classification: Teams standings are calculated as follows: * Log points * Overall points difference * Number of tries scored * Points scored in away matches * Fewest red cards * Toss of a coin

== Results ==
The following matches were played in the 2011 Vodacom Cup:

All times are South African (GMT+2).

=== Round one ===
| 25 February 2011 | Free State Cheetahs | 55–19 | Falcons | Free State Stadium, Bloemfontein |
| 16:45 | Try: Eddie Fredericks 6'; Heinrich Brüssow 11'; Riaan Smit 34', 49', 66'; Corné Uys 42', 76'; Brendon Groenewald 73'; Con: Louis Strydom 7', 35', 50', 67', 74', 77' (6/8); Pen: Louis Strydom 5' (1/1) | Report; Scoreboard | Try: Arno Poley 21'; Shöne van der Walt 53', 78'; Con: Martin Thomsen (0/1); Dillon Laubscher 54', 79' (2/2); Pen: Arno Poley (0/1) | Attendance: 5,000; Referee: Marius van der Westhuizen |

| 25 February 2011 | Border Bulldogs | 21–27 | Leopards | Buffalo City Stadium, East London |
| 19:00 | Try: Ben Venter 25'; Craig Green 45'; Con: Byron McGuigan 46' (1/2); Pen: Byron McGuigan 29', 40' (2/4); Ntabeni Dukisa 74' (1/1) | Report; Scoreboard | Try: Dauw Steyn 19'; Danie Crous 35', 57'; Roan van Heerden 77'; Con: Dauw Steyn 36' (1/3); Colin Lloyd 78' (1/1); Pen: Dauw Steyn 39' (1/1) | Attendance: 1,000; Referee: Tiaan Jonker |

| 25 February 2011 | Eastern Province Kings | 47–12 | Welwitschias | Nelson Mandela Bay Stadium, Port Elizabeth |
| 19:00 | Try: Milo Nqoro 3'; Darron Nell 8'; Barend Pieterse 17'; Siyanda Grey 24', 57'; Morné Hanekom 66'; Monty Dumond 79'; Con: Matthew Tayler-Smith 4', 18' (2/3); Monty Dumond 25', 58', 67', 80' (4/4); Cards: Ross Kennedy (yellow card) 20' to 30'; Ronnie Uys (yellow card) 72' | Report; Scoreboard | Try: Heini Bock 5'; PJ van Lill 69'; Con: Jacky Bock (0/1); Chrysander Botha 70' (1/1) | Referee: Joey Salmans |

| 25 February 2011 | SWD Eagles | 26–35 | Pumas | Outeniqua Park, George |
| 19:00 | Try: Howard Noble 6'; Dean Hopp 26'; Lyndon Hartnick 51'; Wentsley Scott 72'; Con: Ambrose Barends 8', 52' (2/3); Deroy Rhoode 72' (1/1); Pen: Ambrose Barends (0/1) | Report; Scoreboard | Try: Jaco Bouwer 22', 42'; Marius Coetzer 39'; Coenie van Wyk 57'; Ricardo Croy 68'; Con: Coenie van Wyk 39' (1/4); Ricardo Croy 68' (1/1); Pen: Coenie van Wyk 53' (1/1); Ricardo Croy 77' (1/1) | Referee: Quinton Immelman |

| 26 February 2011 | Sharks XV | 30–19 | Blue Bulls | Kings Park Stadium, Durban |
| 14:40 | Try: Riaan Swanepoel 17'; Kobus de Kock 34', 77'; Mark Richards 67'; Con: Guy Cronjé 35' (1/2); Fred Zeilinga 78' (1/2); Pen: Guy Cronjé 10', 28' (2/2) | Report; Scoreboard | Try: CJ Stander 62'; Con: Louis Fouché 63' (1/1); Pen: Louis Fouché 22', 29', 48' (3/4); Drop: JC Roos 40' (1/1) | Attendance: 5,000; Referee: Rasta Rasivhenge |

| 26 February 2011 | Pampas XV | 52–29 | Griffons | Fanie du Toit Sport Ground, Potchefstroom |
| 15:00 | Try: Juan Imhoff 9'; Gabriel Ascárate 29'; Martín Landajo 35'; Miguel de Achával 39'; Agustín Gosio 41'; Joaquín Tuculet 61'; Matías Cortese 79'; Con: Nicolás Sánchez 10', 30', 36', 40', 42' (5/5); Santiago González Iglesias 62', 80' (2/2); Pen: Nicolás Sánchez 7' (1/2); Cards: Mauricio Guidone (yellow card) 20' to 30' | Report; Scoreboard | Try: Shane Hancke 14'; Nicky Steyn 52'; Tertius Maarman 69'; Ossie Nortjé 74'; Con: Tiaan van Wyk 52', 70', 75' (3/4); Pen: Tiaan van Wyk 3' (1/1) | Attendance: 8,000; Referee: Pro Legoete |

| 26 February 2011 | Boland Cavaliers | 25–42 | Griquas | Glaskasteel, Bredasdorp |
| 16:00 | Try: PJ van Zyl 49'; Johnathan Francke 60'; Junior Bester 75'; Con: Jacquin Jansen 61', 76' (2/3); Pen: Jacquin Jansen 13', 29' (2/3) | Report; Scoreboard | Try: Wilmaure Louw 15'; Simon Westraadt 31'; Wesley Wilkins 37', 68'; Fabian Juries 44'; Matthew Dobson 63'; Con: Rudi Vogt 16', 32', 38', 45', 64', 69' (6/6); Pen: Rudi Vogt (0/1); Cards: Steph Roberts (yellow card) 24' to 34'; Earl Rose (yellow card) 58' to 68' | Referee: Stephan Geldenhuys |

| 26 February 2011 | Western Province | 18–18 | Golden Lions | Newlands Stadium, Cape Town |
| 16:45 | Try: Johann Sadie 36'; Bom Samaai 62'; Con: Sam Lane (0/1); Kurt Coleman 63' (1/1); Pen: Sam Lane 14' (1/3); Kurt Coleman 80' (1/2); Drop: Marcel Brache (0/1) | Report; Scoreboard | Try: Jannie Boshoff 18'; Edgar Marutlulle 72'; Con: André Pretorius 19' (1/2); Pen: André Pretorius 50' (1/2); Drop: André Pretorius 13' (1/1) | Attendance: 7,000; Referee: Archie Sehlako |

=== Round two ===
| 4 March 2011 | Golden Lions | 9–15 | Pampas XV | Ellis Park Stadium, Johannesburg |
| 16:45 | Pen: André Pretorius 2', 43', 46' (3/5) | Report; Scoreboard | Try: Leonardo Senatore 4'; Juan Imhoff 23'; Con: Nicolás Sánchez 24' (1/2); Pen: Nicolás Sánchez (0/2); Santiago González Iglesias 70' (1/1); Drop: Nicolás Sánchez (0/1); Cards: Maximilano Bustos (yellow card) 30' to 40'; Leonardo Senatore (yellow card) 51' to 61' | Attendance: 5,000; Referee: François Groenewald |

| 4 March 2011 | Leopards | 25–31 | Eastern Province Kings | Olën Park, Potchefstroom |
| 18:00 | Try: Jaco van Zyl 48'; Con: Dauw Steyn 49' (1/1); Pen: Dauw Steyn 1', 6', 11', 42', 51' (5/8); Colin Lloyd 77' (1/1) | Report; Scoreboard | Try: Norman Nelson 31'; Barend Pieterse 64'; Mpho Mbiyozo 73'; Con: Monty Dumond 32' (1/1); Jaco van Schalkwyk 74' (1/2); Pen: Monty Dumond 3', 8', 21', 38' (4/4); Jaco van Schalkwyk (0/1) | Referee: Rasta Rasivhenge |

| 5 March 2011 | Falcons | 14–86 | Western Province | Barnard Stadium, Kempton Park |
| 15:00 | Try: Kyle Hendricks 51'; Coert Cronjé 72'; Con: Dillon Laubscher 51', 72' (2/2) | Report; Scoreboard | Try: Sidney Tobias 13'; JJ Engelbrecht 18', 22'; Nic Groom 23'; Tim Whitehead 30'; Wimpie van der Walt 34', 56'; Siya Kolisi 47'; Hilton Lobberts 59'; Marcel Brache 63'; Yaya Hartzenberg 68' penalty try 78'; Lionel Cronjé 80'; Con: Lionel Cronjé 13', 18', 22', 23', 30', 47', 56', 63', 78' (9/13); Pen: Lionel Cronjé 6' (1/1) | Referee: Francisco Pastrana |

| 5 March 2011 | Pumas | 36–35 | Free State Cheetahs | Ermelo High School, Ermelo |
| 15:00 | Try: Coenie van Wyk 44'; Deon Scholtz 60'; Doppies le Roux 71'; Con: Ricardo Croy 45', 61', 72' (3/3); Pen: Ricardo Croy 4', 25', 35', 40' (4/5); Drop: Ricardo Croy 78' (1/1) | Report; Scoreboard | Try: Tertius Carse 13', 57'; Corné Uys 52', 83'; Con: Johan Goosen 14', 53', 58' (3/4); Pen: Johan Goosen 7', 18', 37' (3/3) | Referee: Mlungiseleli Mdashe |

| 5 March 2011 | Griquas | 84–9 | Border Bulldogs | Diamantveld High School, Kimberley |
| 15:00 | Try: Wesley Wilkins 5', 28', 40'; Ashley Wells 11'; Richard Lawson 14', 59'; Barry Geel 25'; Fabian Juries 34'; Frikkie Spies 36'; Wilmaure Louw 38'; Logan Basson 48'; Rudi Vogt 65'; Leon Karemaker 77'; Con: Rudi Vogt 12', 15', 35', 66' (4/9); Earl Rose 37', 39', 40', 49' (4/4); Pen: Rudi Vogt 2' (1/1); Cards: Justin Downey (yellow card) 21' to 31' | Report; Scoreboard | Pen: Byron McGuigan 8', 15', 24' (3/3); Cards: Byron McGuigan (yellow card) 28' to 39'; Shane Spring (red card) 35'; Onke Dubase (yellow card) 39' | Referee: Matt Kemp |

| 5 March 2011 | Griffons | 38–41 | SWD Eagles | North West Stadium, Welkom |
| 15:00 | Try: Thabang Molefe 5'; Tertius Maarman 6'; Shane Hancke 13'; Nicky Steyn 36'; Johan van Heerden 56'; Con: Tiaan van Wyk 5', 7', 14', 37', 57' (5/5); Pen: Tiaan van Wyk 24' (1/2) | Report; Scoreboard | Try: Marchell Potts 9'; Howard Noble 22'; Sewes Oosthuizen 26'; Mzo Dyantyi 42'; Braam Immelman 69', 73'; Con: Ambrose Barends 11', 23', 28', 43' (4/6); Pen: Ambrose Barends 60' (1/1) | Attendance: 100; Referee: Lusanda Jam |

| 5 March 2011 | Welwitschias | 5–25 | Sharks XV | Hage Geingob Stadium, Windhoek |
| 16:00 | Try: Morné Blom 12'; Con: Chrysander Botha (0/1); Cards: Morné Blom (yellow card) 33' to 44' | Report; Scoreboard | Try: Kobus de Kock 1', 66'; S'bura Sithole 36'; Marcell Coetzee 43'; Con: Guy Cronjé 37' (1/3); Fred Zeilinga (0/1); Pen: Guy Cronjé 19' (1/2) | Referee: Jaco Peyper |

| 5 March 2011 | Blue Bulls | 17–20 | Boland Cavaliers | Loftus Versfeld, Pretoria |
| 16:45 | Try: Stefan Watermeyer 6', 65'; Pieter van der Walt 79'; Con: Marnitz Boshoff 66' (1/2); Louis Fouché (0/1); Pen: Marnitz Boshoff (0/2); Drop: Clayton Blommetjies (0/1); Cards: Dean Greyling (yellow card) 42' to 53'; Akona Ndungane (yellow card) 47' to 58' | Report; Scoreboard | Try: Cornal Hendricks 25'; Clemen Lewis 31'; Bolla Conradie 49'; Con: Elgar Watts (0/2); Jacquin Jansen 50' (1/1); Pen: Elgar Watts (0/1); Jacquin Jansen 74' (1/3) | Referee: Lourens van der Merwe |

=== Round three ===
| 11 March 2011 | Western Province | 56–9 | Welwitschias | Newlands Stadium, Cape Town |
| 16:45 | Try: Lionel Cronjé 2', 71'; Bom Samaai 4'; Johann Sadie 31'; Wimpie van der Walt 36'; Louis Schreuder 46'; JJ Engelbrecht 64'; Alistair Vermaak 66'; Marcel Brache 77'; Con: Lionel Cronjé 5', 32', 72', 78' (4/9); Pen: Lionel Cronjé 41' (1/1) | Report; Scoreboard | Pen: Chrysander Botha 17', 28', 44' (3/4) | Attendance: 5,000; Referee: Gerrie de Bruin |

| 11 March 2011 | Border Bulldogs | 19–16 | Griffons | Buffalo City Stadium, East London |
| 19:00 | Try: Ntando Kebe 3'; Chumani Booi 35'; Samora Fihlani 80'; Con: Byron McGuigan 4' (1/2); Ntabeni Dukisa 81' (1/1); Pen: Byron McGuigan (0/1); Drop: Russel Jeacocks (0/1); Cards: Khwezi Mkhafu (yellow card) 74' | Report; Scoreboard | Try: Ricardo Pietersen 13'; Con: Tiaan van Wyk 14' (1/1); Pen: Tiaan van Wyk 39', 69', 74' (3/4); Cards: Thabang Molefe (yellow card) 63' to 73' | Attendance: 1,000; Referee: Francisco Pastrana |

| 11 March 2011 | Eastern Province Kings | 23–8 | Pumas | Nelson Mandela Bay Stadium, Port Elizabeth |
| 19:00 | Try: Matthew Tayler-Smith 18'; Marcello Sampson 38'; Con: Jaco van Schalkwyk 18', 38' (2/2); Pen: Jaco van Schalkwyk 35', 44' (2/4); Drop: Jaco van Schalkwyk 64' (1/1); Cards: Ronnie Uys (yellow card) 54' to 63' | Report; Scoreboard | Try: Deon Scholtz 60'; Con: Braam Pretorius (0/1); Pen: Braam Pretorius 24' (1/1) | Attendance: 2,300; Referee: Dilbert November |

| 11 March 2011 | SWD Eagles | 0–33 | Griquas | Loerie Park, Knysna |
| 19:00 | Cards: Ambrose Barends (yellow card) 46' to 57' | Report; Scoreboard | Try: Simon Westraadt 13'; Wilmaure Louw 20'; Leon Karemaker 48'; Logan Basson 56'; Earl Rose 71'; Con: Earl Rose 14', 21', 49', 57' (4/5) | Referee: Stuart Berry |

| 12 March 2011 | Free State Cheetahs | 38–24 | Leopards | Free State Stadium, Bloemfontein |
| 14:40 | Try: Marcel van der Merwe 31'; Morgan Newman 38', 72'; Eddie Fredericks 54'; Corné Uys 65'; Con: Louis Strydom 32', 39', 55', 66', 73' (5/5); Pen: Louis Strydom 51' (1/2) | Report; Scoreboard | Try: Shandré Frolick 27'; Joubert Engelbrecht 60'; Jaco van Zyl 76'; Con: Clayton Durand 28', 61', 77' (3/3); Pen: Clayton Durand 25' (1/2) | Attendance: 1,000; Referee: Quinton Immelman |

| 12 March 2011 | Boland Cavaliers | 10–32 | Golden Lions | Moorreesburg Stadium, Moorreesburg |
| 16:30 | Try: Bolla Conradie 48'; Con: Willie le Roux 49' (1/1); Pen: Willie le Roux 5' (1/3); Cards: Zandré Jordaan (yellow card) 55' to 64' | Report; Scoreboard | Try: Tonderai Chavhanga 10'; Alwyn Hollenbach 58'; Jonathan Mokuena 61'; Dries van Schalkwyk 77'; Con: André Pretorius 11', 59', 62' (3/4); Pen: André Pretorius 53', 56' (2/2); Cards: David de Villiers (yellow card) 68' | Referee: Archie Sehlako |

| 12 March 2011 | Sharks XV | 67–26 | Falcons | Ugu Sports Grounds, Margate |
| 16:30 | Try: Piet Lindeque 4', 61'; Howard Mnisi 11'; Kobus de Kock 15'; Lee Thompson 22', 55'; Daniel Adongo 38'; Trompie Pretorius 47'; Kyle Cooper 52'; Ross Cronjé 57'; Cobus Reinach 81'; Con: Guy Cronjé 12', 23', 39' (3/6); Kobus de Kock 53', 62', 82' (3/5) | Report; Scoreboard | Try: Kyle Hendricks 7'; Jaco Snyman 30'; Arno Poley 64'; Coert Cronjé 73'; Con: Dewald Nel 31', 65', 74' (3/4); Cards: Thulani Ngidi (yellow card) 54' to 64' | Referee: Rasta Rasivhenge |

| 12 March 2011 | Pampas XV | 27–22 | Blue Bulls | Olën Park, Potchefstroom |
| 19:10 | Try: Santiago González Iglesias 28'; Leonardo Senatore 38'; Nicolás Bruzzone 45'; Con: Santiago González Iglesias 29', 39', 46' (3/3); Pen: Santiago González Iglesias 7' (1/2); Nicolás Sánchez 77' (1/2); Cards: Miguel de Achával (yellow card) 66' to 76' | Report; Scoreboard | Try: Akona Ndungane 62'; Marnus Schoeman 66'; Okkie Kruger 70'; Con: Francois Brummer 63' (1/2); Louis Fouché 71' (1/1); Pen: Francois Brummer 11' (1/4) | Attendance: 500; Referee: Sandile Mayende |

=== Round four ===
| 18 March 2011 | Griquas | 29–32 | Pampas XV | Diamantveld High School, Kimberley |
| 15:30 | Try: Rocco Jansen 20'; Barry Geel 25'; Matthew Dobson 55'; Wilmaure Louw 63'; Con: Earl Rose 21', 26', 56' (3/4); Pen: Earl Rose 34' (1/2); Logan Basson (0/1) | Report; Scoreboard | Try: Martín Landajo 10'; Bruno Postiglioni 48'; Con: Nicolás Sánchez 11', 49' (2/2); Pen: Nicolás Sánchez 23', 28', 39', 43', 53', 77' (6/6) | Attendance: 1,000; Referee: Francois de Bruin |

| 18 March 2011 | Pumas | 73–14 | Border Bulldogs | Puma Stadium, Witbank |
| 19:00 | Try: Corné Steenkamp 6', 40'; Deon Scholtz 11'; Coenie van Wyk 24'; JW Jonker 36', 55'; Brett Nel 54'; Dewald Pretorius 62', 76'; Dewald Pieters 70'; Doppies le Roux 80'; Con: Coenie van Wyk 7', 12', 37', 40', 56', 63', 71', 77', 81' (9/11) | Report; Scoreboard | Try: Thembani Mkokeli 21', 59'; Con: Russel Jeacocks 22' (1/1); Byron McGuigan 60' (1/1); Pen: Russel Jeacocks (0/1) | Attendance: 500; Referee: Marius van der Westhuizen |

| 19 March 2011 | Golden Lions | 23–15 | Sharks XV | Ellis Park Stadium, Johannesburg |
| 14:40 | Try: Dusty Noble 2'; Divan Ferguson 33'; Con: André Pretorius 3', 34' (2/2); Pen: André Pretorius 11', 39', 72' (3/5); Drop: André Pretorius (0/3); JP Joubert (0/1) | Report; Scoreboard | Try: Guy Cronjé 6'; Piet Lindeque 26'; Con: Guy Cronjé 7' (1/2); Pen: Ross Cronjé 36' (1/2) | Referee: Quinton Immelman |

| 19 March 2011 | Falcons | 0–51 | Eastern Province Kings | Isak Steyl Stadium, Vanderbijlpark |
| 15:00 | Pen: Dewald Nel (0/1) | Report; Scoreboard | Try: Darron Nell 3'; Marcello Sampson 9'; Norman Nelson 28', 76'; Devin Oosthuizen 37', 51'; Siyanda Grey 42'; Morne Hanekom 72'; Con: Jaco van Schalkwyk 4', 10', 29', 42' (4/6); Monty Dumond (0/2); Pen: Jaco van Schalkwyk 8' (1/1) | Attendance: 500; Referee: Jason Jaftha |

| 19 March 2011 | Griffons | 40–38 | Boland Cavaliers | North West Stadium, Welkom |
| 15:00 | Try: Nicky Steyn 8'; Windpomp van Rooyen 20'; Andries Mahoney 38'; Thabang Molefe 62'; Con: Tiaan van Wyk 9', 21', 39', 63' (4/4); Pen: Tiaan van Wyk 15', 54', 70' (3/4); Drop: Tiaan van Wyk 6' (1/1) | Report; Scoreboard | Try: Rossouw Kruger 24'; Bolla Conradie 29', 56'; Willie le Roux 41'; Johnathan Francke 60'; Grant le Roux 66'; Con: Willie le Roux 25', 30', 57', 60' (4/6); Pen: Willie le Roux (0/1) | Attendance: 500; Referee: Pro Legoete |

| 19 March 2011 | Leopards | 47–8 | SWD Eagles | Wouter de Vos Stadium, Mafikeng |
| 16:00 | Try: Shandré Frolick 8', 79'; Dumisani Matyeshana 14', 75'; Joubert Engelbrecht 28', 63'; BG Uys 48'; Con: Clayton Durand 9', 29', 49', 63', 75', 80' (6/7); Cards: Christo van Niekerk (yellow card) 71' | Report; Scoreboard | Try: Dean Hopp 56'; Con: Deroy Rhoode (0/1); Pen: Deroy Rhoode 18' (1/1) | Attendance: 1,200; Referee: Lusanda Jam |

| 19 March 2011 | Welwitschias | 13–29 | Free State Cheetahs | Hage Geingob Stadium, Windhoek |
| 16:00 | Try: PJ van Lill; Con: Chrysander Botha 58' (1/1); Pen: Chrysander Botha 8', 62' (2/2) | Report; Scoreboard | Try: AJ Coertzen 2'; Riaan Smit 11'; Brendon Groenewald 44'; Enrico Acker 68'; Con: Louis Strydom 3', 45', 69' (3/4); Pen: Louis Strydom 19' (1/1) | Attendance: 1,000; Referee: Rasta Rasivhenge |

| 19 March 2011 | Blue Bulls | 8–16 | Western Province | Loftus Versfeld, Pretoria |
| 16:30 | Try: Stephan Dippenaar 13'; Con: Marnitz Boshoff (0/1); Pen: Marnitz Boshoff 41' (1/2); Cards: Zane Botha (yellow card) 37' to 46'; Morné Mellett (yellow card) 78' | Report; Scoreboard | Try: Nic Groom 9'; Con: Lionel Cronjé 10' (1/1); Pen: Lionel Cronjé 34', 38', 55' (3/4) | Attendance: 3,000; Referee: Francisco Pastrana |

=== Round Five ===
| 25 March 2011 | Boland Cavaliers | 17–26 | Pumas | Boland Stadium, Wellington |
| 16:30 | Try: Johnathan Francke 1'; Rossouw Kruger 49'; Con: Willie le Roux 2', 50' (2/2); Pen: Willie le Roux 24' (1/2) | Report; Scoreboard | Try: Rudi Mathee 11' penalty try 55'; JW Jonker 78'; Con: Coenie van Wyk 56' (1/2); Valentine van Wyk (0/1); Pen: Coenie van Wyk 34', 43', 52' (3/3) | Attendance: 500; Referee: Francisco Pastrana |

| 25 March 2011 | Free State Cheetahs | 21–45 | Blue Bulls | Shimla Park, Bloemfontein |
| 18:00 | Try: Robbie van Schalkwyk 59'; Marcel van der Merwe 66'; Con: Louis Strydom 67' (1/2); Pen: Louis Strydom 14', 26' (2/3); Drop: Louis Strydom 21' (1/1); Cards: JC Astle (yellow card) 44' to 55' | Report; Scoreboard | Try: Juandré Kruger 10'; Clayton Blommetjies 23'; Gerrit-Jan van Velze 30'; Marnus Schoeman 40'; Corné Fourie 45'; Stefan Watermeyer 52'; William Small-Smith 77'; Con: Marnitz Boshoff 11' (1/3); Stefan Watermeyer 40', 46', 53', 78' (4/4); Pen: Marnitz Boshoff (0/2); Drop: Marnitz Boshoff (0/1); Cards: Stephan Dippenaar (yellow card) 65' to 75' | Attendance: 1,000; Referee: Stuart Berry |

| 25 March 2011 | Border Bulldogs | 15–43 | Falcons | Buffalo City Stadium, East London |
| 19:00 | Try: Matthew Taljard 13'; Onke Dubase 69'; Con: Byron McGuigan 70' (1/2); Pen: Byron McGuigan 28' (1/2); Cards: Sino Nyoka (yellow card) 62' to 72' | Report; Scoreboard | Try: Coert Cronjé 2'; Warren Perkins 9'; Reg Muller 36', 76'; Kyle Hendricks 45'; Willie Odendaal 58'; Theo Becker 73'; Con: Dillon Laubscher 37' (1/3); Kyle Hendricks 46', 74', 77' (3/4); Pen: Dillon Laubscher (0/1) | Attendance: 700; Referee: Sandile Mayende |

| 25 March 2011 | Eastern Province Kings | 10–11 | Golden Lions | Nelson Mandela Bay Stadium, Port Elizabeth |
| 19:00 | Try: Clint Newland 54'; Con: Jaco van Schalkwyk 55' (1/1); Pen: Jaco van Schalkwyk 62' (1/3); Drop: Mzwandile Stick (0/1); Cards: Mzwandile Stick (red card) 33' | Report; Scoreboard | Try: Dusty Noble 37'; Con: Burton Francis (0/1); Pen: Burton Francis 26', 65' (2/7); Cards: Marius Delport (yellow card) 33' to 43'; Martin Bezuidenhout (yellow card) 50' to 60' | Attendance: 3,500; Referee: François Groenewald |

| 25 March 2011 | SWD Eagles | 34–27 | Welwitschias | Outeniqua Park, George |
| 19:10 | Try: Clinton Wagman 1'; Dean Hopp 5'; Howard Noble 12'; Henk Eksteen 28'; Anton van der Westhuizen 43'; Deroy Rhoode 48'; Con: Ambrose Barends 6', 44' (2/6); Pen: Jason Horne (0/2) | Report; Scoreboard | Try: Sergio de la Harpe 15'; PJ van Lill 19'; Vaughan Pietersen 37'; Chrysander Botha 56'; Con: Chrysander Botha 20', 57' (2/4); Pen: Chrysander Botha 32' (1/1) | Attendance: 800; Referee: Marius van der Westhuizen |

| 26 March 2011 | Western Province | 23–22 | Griquas | DHL Newlands Stadium, Cape Town |
| 12:40 | Try: Johann Sadie 7'; Wimpie van der Walt 80'; Con: Gary van Aswegen 8', 81' (2/2); Pen: Gary van Aswegen 5', 25', 52' (3/4); Cards: Paul Bosch (yellow card) 57' to 67' | Report; Scoreboard | Try: Richard Lawson 19'; Wesley Wilkins 42'; Leon Karemaker 64'; Con: Earl Rose 20', 65' (2/3); Pen: Earl Rose 23' (1/2) | Attendance: 5,000; Referee: Ben Crouse |

| 26 March 2011 | Sharks XV | 63–7 | Griffons | Mick Kelly Park, Empangeni |
| 15:30 | Try: Roscko Speckman 19'; Ross Cronjé 21'; Kobus de Kock 22'; Riaan Swanepoel 38'; Mark Richards 46'; Daniel Adongo 55'; Marcell Coetzee 62'; Trompie Pretorius 71'; Piet Lindeque 76'; Con: Guy Cronjé 20', 22', 23', 39', 47', 56', 63', 72', 77' (9/9); Pen: Ross Cronjé (0/1) | Report; Scoreboard | Try: Thabang Molefe 10'; Con: Tiaan van Wyk 11' (1/1) | Referee: Jonathan Kaplan |

| 26 March 2011 | Pampas XV | 38–20 | Leopards | Olën Park, Potchefstroom |
| 18:00 | Try: Agustín Gosio 2', 53'; Mariano Galarza 38'; Juan Imhoff 42'; Tomás Cubelli 49'; Con: Santiago González Iglesias 4', 39', 43', 50', 54' (5/5); Pen: Santiago González Iglesias 10' (1/2); Cards: Juan Imhoff (yellow card) 61' to 71' | Report; Scoreboard | Try: Christo van Niekerk 7'; Joubert Engelbrecht 51'; Joe Seerane 60'; Con: Clayton Durand 8' (1/1); Cecil Dumond (0/2); Pen: Clayton Durand 18' (1/1) | Attendance: 800; Referee: Tiaan Jonker |

=== Round Six ===
| 1 April 2011 | Falcons | 33–26 | SWD Eagles | Barnard Stadium, Kempton Park |
| 18:00 | Try: Coert Cronjé 39'; Kyle Hendricks 43'; Shöne van der Walt 53'; Con: Kyle Hendricks 40', 44', 54' (3/3); Pen: Kyle Hendricks 13', 46', 59' (3/3); Arno Poley (0/1); Drop: Arno Poley 63' (1/1); Cards: Theo Becker (yellow card) 55' to 67' | Report; Scoreboard | Try: Dean Hopp 9'; Baldwin McBean 17'; Braam Immelman 56'; Howard Noble 66'; Con: Ambrose Barends 10', 18' (2/2); Deroy Rhoode 57' (1/2) | Attendance: 500; Referee: François Groenewald |

| 1 April 2011 | Leopards | 14–43 | Boland Cavaliers | Olën Park, Potchefstroom |
| 18:00 | Try: Joubert Engelbrecht 35'; Whestley Moolman 65'; Con: Johnny Welthagen 36' (1/1); SW Oosthuizen 66' (1/1); Pen: SW Oosthuizen (0/1); Johnny Welthagen (0/1); Cards: Thabo Mamojele (yellow card) 40' to 50' | Report; Scoreboard | Try: Clemen Lewis 5'; Brendon April 39', 50'; Allister Kettledas 54', 73'; Willie le Roux 59'; Con: Willie le Roux 6', 40', 51', 55', 60' (5/6); Pen: Willie le Roux 43' (1/2); Cards: Allister Kettledas (yellow card) 16' to 26' | Attendance: 1,500; Referee: Stuart Berry |

| 1 April 2011 | Griquas | 23–16 | Sharks XV | Griqua Park, Kimberley |
| 19:00 | Try: Leon Karemaker 11'; Wesley Wilkins 31'; Burger Schoeman 73'; Con: Earl Rose 32' (1/3); Pen: Logan Basson (0/1); Drop: Earl Rose 40', 57' (2/2) | Report; Scoreboard | Try: Kobus de Kock 70'; Con: Kobus de Kock 71' (1/1); Pen: Guy Cronjé 44' (1/4); Ross Cronjé 55', 62' (2/2) | Attendance: 300; Referee: Tiaan Jonker |

| 1 April 2011 | Pumas | 20–46 | Pampas XV | Puma Stadium, Witbank |
| 19:10 | Try: Deon Scholtz 18'; Con: Coenie van Wyk (0/1); Pen: Coenie van Wyk 8', 21', 25', 37', 51' (5/6) | Report; Scoreboard | Try: Agustín Gosio 9', 66'; Maximiliano Nannini 33'; Nicolás Bruzzone 47'; Juan Imhoff 54'; Gabriel Ascárate 78'; Con: Nicolás Sánchez 10', 48', 55', 67' (4/5); Santiago González Iglesias 79' (1/1); Pen: Nicolás Sánchez 5', 44' (2/4); Cards: Julio Farías Cabello (yellow card) 15' to 25' | Attendance: 1,500; Referee: Quinton Immelman |

| 2 April 2011 | Golden Lions | 37–19 | Free State Cheetahs | Ellis Park Stadium, Johannesburg |
| 12:35 | Try: Dries van Schalkwyk 27', 42'; Dusty Noble 39'; Martin Bezuidenhout 51'; Con: Burton Francis 28', 40', 43', 52' (4/4); Pen: Burton Francis 7', 17', 35' (3/4) | Report; Scoreboard | Try: Franna du Toit 69'; Marcel van der Merwe 76'; Con: Franna du Toit (0/2); Pen: Johan Goosen 2', 5', 13' (3/5); Drop: Johan Goosen (0/1) | Attendance: 2,500; Referee: Matt Kemp |

| 2 April 2011 | Griffons | 0–60 | Western Province | North West Stadium, Welkom |
| 15:00 | Cards: Windpomp van Rooyen (yellow card) 68' | Report; Scoreboard | Try: JJ Engelbrecht 7', 39', 58', 66'; Bom Samaai 19', 31'; Lionel Cronjé 50'; Johann Sadie 64'; Reuben Johannes 70'; Con: Lionel Cronjé 8', 32', 40', 51', 59', 65' (6/9); Pen: Lionel Cronjé 10' (1/1); Drop: Kurt Coleman (0/1) | Attendance: 300; Referee: Archie Sehlako |

| 2 April 2011 | Blue Bulls | 29–28 | Eastern Province Kings | Loftus Versfeld, Pretoria |
| 15:00 | Try: Clayton Blommetjies 3'; Sampie Mastriet 33'; Marnus Schoeman 69'; Con: Marnitz Boshoff 70' (1/3); Pen: Marnitz Boshoff 11', 18', 26', 61' (4/5); Drop: Marnitz Boshoff (0/1); Cards: Marnus Schoeman (yellow card) 73' | Report; Scoreboard | Try: Norman Nelson 16'; SP Marais 22'; Frank Herne 76'; Con: Jaco van Schalkwyk 17', 77' (2/3); Pen: Jaco van Schalkwyk 40', 54', 58' (3/3) | Attendance: 2,000; Referee: Francisco Pastrana |

| 2 April 2011 | Welwitschias | 20–20 | Border Bulldogs | Hage Geingob Stadium, Windhoek |
| 16:00 | Try: Tinus du Plessis 15'; David Philander 59'; Con: Chrysander Botha 16', 60' (2/2); Pen: Chrysander Botha 26', 55' (2/2) | Report; Scoreboard | Try: Byron McGuigan 43'; Lonwabo Ntlama 77'; Chumani Booi 79'; Con: Ntabeni Dukisa (0/1); Ntando Kebe (0/1); Byron McGuigan 80' (1/1); Pen: Byron McGuigan 50' (1/5); Ntabeni Dukisa (0/2) | Referee: Ben Crouse |

=== Round Seven ===
| 8 April 2011 | Boland Cavaliers | 71–33 | Welwitschias | Boland Stadium, Wellington |
| 16:00 | Try: Franzel September 3'; Brendon April 9', 21'; Braam Gerber 19'; Willie le Roux 34', 47'; Zandré Jordaan 59', 81'; Elgar Watts 62'; Johnathan Francke 72', 79'; Con: Willie le Roux 4', 20', 35', 48', 60', 63', 80', 82' (8/11) | Report; Scoreboard | Try: Bertus O'Callaghan 29'; Tinus du Plessis 37', 68'; Lewellyn Winkler 40'; Theuns Kotzé 74'; Con: Chrysander Botha 30', 40', 69' (3/4); Theuns Kotzé 75' (1/1) | Attendance: 600; Referee: François Groenewald |

| 8 April 2011 | SWD Eagles | 14–37 | Golden Lions | Outeniqua Park, George |
| 19:00 | Try: Howard Noble 23'; Clinton Wagman 79'; Con: Raynor Becker 24' (1/1); Deroy Rhoode 80' (1/1) | Report; Scoreboard | Try: Johan Snyman 29'; Dries van Schalkwyk 34'; Michael Bondesio 40', 45'; Con: Burton Francis 30', 35', 40', 46' (4/4); Pen: Burton Francis 13', 20', 25' (3/3) | Attendance: 800; Referee: Archie Sehlako |

| 8 April 2011 | Border Bulldogs | 8–34 | Blue Bulls | Buffalo City Stadium, East London |
| 19:10 | Try: Khwezi Mkhafu 66'; Con: Byron McGuigan (0/1); Pen: Byron McGuigan 43' (1/2); Cards: Luvuyo Magwaxaza (yellow card) 18' to 29' | Report; Scoreboard | Try: Fudge Mabeta 5'; Sampie Mastriet 20', 78'; Corné Fourie 38', 57'; Con: Marnitz Boshoff 6', 21', 39' (3/4); Pieter van der Walt (0/1); Pen: Marnitz Boshoff 2' (1/2); Cards: CJ Stander (yellow card) 63' | Attendance: 1,000; Referee: Marius van der Westhuizen |

| 9 April 2011 | Western Province | 27–14 | Pumas | Newlands Stadium, Cape Town |
| 14:40 | Try: JJ Engelbrecht 1'; Michael van der Spuy 7'; Con: Lionel Cronjé 2' (1/2); Pen: Lionel Cronjé 13', 17', 21', 33', 67' (5/5) | Report; Scoreboard | Try: Shaun Venter 10'; Tian Meyer 25'; Con: Coenie van Wyk 11', 26' (2/2); Pen: Coenie van Wyk (0/1) | Attendance: 10,000; Referee: Dilbert November |

| 9 April 2011 | Pampas XV | 57–15 | Falcons | Fanie du Toit Sport Ground, Potchefstroom |
| 15:00 | Try: Benjamin Macome 12'; Joaquín Tuculet 20', 36', 47', 69'; Roman Miralles 22'; Belisario Agulla 60'; Nicolás Sánchez 73'; Ramiro Moyano 80'; Con: Santiago González Iglesias 21', 23', 37', 48', 61', 81' (6/9); Pen: Santiago González Iglesias (0/2) | Report; Scoreboard | Try: Nico Engelbrecht 26'; Willie Odendaal 55'; Con: Kyle Hendricks 27' (1/2); Pen: Kyle Hendricks 20' (1/2) | Attendance: 200; Referee: Gerrie de Bruin |

| 9 April 2011 | Free State Cheetahs | 38–24 | Griffons | Clive Solomon Stadium, Heidedal |
| 15:00 | Try: Willie Britz 17', 73'; Enrico Acker 19', 58'; Morgan Newman 51'; Con: Louis Strydom 18', 20' (2/2); Johan Goosen 52', 59', 74' (3/3); Pen: Louis Strydom 3' (1/1) | Report; Scoreboard | Try: Thabang Molefe 23'; Ricardo Pietersen 26'; Tertius Maarman 48'; Shane Hancke 79'; Con: Tiaan van Wyk 49', 79' (2/4); Pen: Tiaan van Wyk (0/3) | Attendance: 4,000; Referee: Joey Salmans |

| 9 April 2011 | Eastern Province Kings | 26–16 | Griquas | Grey High School, Port Elizabeth |
| 16:00 | Try: Wayne Stevens 4'; Jacques Engelbrecht 50', 58'; Jaco Engels 73'; Con: Jaco van Schalkwyk 5' (1/2); SP Marais 51', 59' (2/2); Pen: Jaco van Schalkwyk (0/3); SP Marais (0/1); Cards: Ross Kennedy (yellow card) 1' to 12' | Report; Scoreboard | Try: Johan Herbst 24', 40'; Con: Rudi Vogt (0/2); Pen: Rudi Vogt 6', 12' (2/3) | Referee: Matt Kemp |

| 9 April 2011 | Sharks XV | 38–7 | Leopards | Kings Park Stadium, Durban |
| 16:45 | Try: Mark Richards 9', 37'; Roscko Speckman 10', 34'; Marcell Coetzee 47'; Daniel Adongo 79'; Con: Kobus de Kock 11', 35', 48' (3/5); Gouws Prinsloo 80' (1/1); Pen: Kobus de Kock (0/1) | Report; Scoreboard | Try: Walter Venter 76'; Con: SW Oosthuizen 77' (1/1); Pen: Johnny Welthagen (0/1) | Attendance: 1,000; Referee: Tiaan Jonker |

=== Round Eight ===
| 15 April 2011 | Griffons | 43–45 | Eastern Province Kings | North West Stadium, Welkom |
| 16:00 | Try: Thabang Molefe 24', 69'; Ricardo Pietersen 47'; Japie Nel 68'; Kevin Stevens 72'; Shane Hancke 77'; Con: Tiaan van Wyk 25', 48' (2/2); Virgil Russel 69' (1/1); Tertius Maarman 73', 78' (2/3); Pen: Tiaan van Wyk 16' (1/2); Cards: Shane Hancke (yellow card) 19' to 29' | Report; Scoreboard | Try: Siyanda Grey 9', 74'; Devin Oosthuizen 20', 49'; Barend Pieterse 28', 53'; Jacques Potgieter 65'; Con: Jaco van Schalkwyk 10', 21', 29' (3/4); Monty Dumond 66', 75' (2/3) | Referee: Lusanda Jam |

| 15 April 2011 | Welwitschias | 10–52 | Pampas XV | Hage Geingob Stadium, Windhoek |
| 18:30 | Try: Theuns Kotzé 56'; Con: Chrysander Botha 57' (1/1); Pen: Chrysander Botha 11' (1/1) | Report; Scoreboard | Try: Julio Farías Cabello 8'; Mauricio Guidone 21'; Martín Landajo 34'; Juan Imhoff 41'; Genaro Fessia 52', 73'; Nicolás Bruzzone 61'; Miguel de Achával 65'; Con: Santiago González Iglesias 35', 42', 53', 62', 66', 74' (6/8); Pen: Santiago González Iglesias (0/1) | Attendance: 1,000; Referee: Pro Legoete |

| 15 April 2011 | Griquas | 26–17 | Free State Cheetahs | Griqua Park, Kimberley |
| 19:00 | Try: Hendrik Roodt 13'; Johan Herbst 73'; Con: Rudi Vogt 14', 74' (2/2); Pen: Rudi Vogt 3', 46', 54', 71' (4/4) | Report; Scoreboard | Try: Morgan Newman 78'; Con: Louis Strydom (0/1); Pen: Louis Strydom 33', 48', 56', 62' (4/5) | Attendance: 500; Referee: Jason Jaftha |

| 15 April 2011 | Pumas | 27–29 | Sharks XV | Mbombela Stadium, Mbombela |
| 19:00 | Try: Corné Steenkamp 22'; JW Jonker 35' penalty try 61'; Con: Coenie van Wyk 23', 36' (2/2); Tiaan Marx 62' (1/1); Pen: Coenie van Wyk 28' (1/2); Carl Bezuidenhout (0/1); Tiaan Marx 44' (1/4) | Report; Scoreboard | Try: Gouws Prinsloo 8'; Conrad Hoffmann 19'; Trompie Pretorius 49'; S'bura Sithole 69'; Con: Gouws Prinsloo 9', 20', 50' (3/4); Pen: Gouws Prinsloo 38' (1/1) | Attendance: 3,000; Referee: Quinton Immelman |

| 16 April 2011 | Golden Lions | 52–19 | Border Bulldogs | Ellis Park Stadium, Johannesburg |
| 14:40 | Try: Edgar Marutlulle 7', 28'; Dylan Des Fountain 15'; Wandile Mjekevu 37'; Renaldo Bothma 43'; Divan Ferguson 52'; David Bulbring 77', 80'; Con: Hein Cronjé 16', 29', 38', 44', 53' (5/6); Kabous Janse van Rensburg 81' (1/2) | Report; Scoreboard | Try: Chumani Booi 47'; Samora Fihlani 64'; Onke Dubase 73'; Con: Byron McGuigan 48', 74' (2/3); Pen: Ntabeni Dukisa (0/2); Byron McGuigan (0/1) | Attendance: 500; Referee: Gerrie de Bruin |

| 16 April 2011 | Blue Bulls | 23–25 | SWD Eagles | Police Fields, Pretoria |
| 15:00 | Try: Francois Venter 6', 28'; Juandré Kruger 10'; Con: Marnitz Boshoff (0/2); Dustin Jinka 11' (1/1); Pen: Marnitz Boshoff 2' (1/1); Dustin Jinka 60' (1/1) | Report; Scoreboard | Try: Howard Noble 3', 44'; Anton van der Westhuizen 78'; Con: Raynor Becker 4', 45' (2/3); Pen: Raynor Becker 9', 41' (2/4) | Attendance: 200; Referee: François Groenewald |

| 16 April 2011 | Falcons | 25–25 | Boland Cavaliers | Barnard Stadium, Kempton Park |
| 15:00 | Try: Warren Perkins 44'; Martin Thomsen 57'; Nico Engelbrecht 67'; Con: Kyle Hendricks 58', 68' (2/3); Pen: Kyle Hendricks 11', 78' (2/2); Cards: Marco Kotze (yellow card) 19' to 29' | Report; Scoreboard | Try: Clemen Lewis 22'; Cornal Hendricks 35'; Braam Gerber 50'; Elgar Watts 80'; Con: Willie le Roux 51' (1/4); Pen: Willie le Roux 16' (1/1) | Attendance: 200; Referee: Dilbert November |

| 16 April 2011 | Leopards | 12–26 | Western Province | Olën Park, Potchefstroom |
| 16:00 | Try: Stompie de Wet 3'; BG Uys 11'; Con: Dauw Steyn 12' (1/2) | Report; Scoreboard | Try: Tim Whitehead 23'; JJ Engelbrecht 26'; Con: Kurt Coleman 24', 27' (2/2); Pen: Kurt Coleman 40', 48', 61', 77' (4/5) | Attendance: 1500; Referee: Rasta Rasivhenge |

=== Quarter-finals ===
| 29 April 2011 | Pampas XV | 41–34 (aet) | Free State Cheetahs | Olën Park, Potchefstroom |
| 16:30 | Try: Julio Farías Cabello 3'; Juan Imhoff 41', 53', 60'; Miguel de Achával 44'; Agustín Gosio 97'; Con: Nicolás Sánchez 4', 45', 54' (3/5); Santiago González Iglesias 98' (1/1); Pen: Nicolás Sánchez 23' (1/3); Santiago González Iglesias (0/2); Drop: Nicolás Sánchez (0/1); Cards: Juan Imhoff (yellow card) 68' to 79' | Report; Scoreboard | Try: Lappies Labuschagné 19'; Eddie Fredericks 29'; Johan Goosen 57'; Marcel van der Merwe 80'; Con: Louis Strydom 20', 30', 58', 81' (4/4); Pen: Louis Strydom 35', 71' (2/2); Johan Goosen (0/1) | Attendance: 200; Referee: Sandile Mayende |

| 29 April 2011 | Griquas | 37–33 (aet) | Pumas | Griqua Park, Kimberley |
| 19:00 | Try: Jandré Blom 9'; Wilmaure Louw 14'; Jaco Nepgen 77'; Richard Lawson 79'; Earl Rose 96'; Con: Rudi Vogt 15', 78', 97' (3/5); Pen: Rudi Vogt 25', 46' (2/3) | Report; Scoreboard | Try: Tian Meyer 4', 73'; Ricardo Croy 20'; Con: Ricardo Croy 5', 21', 74' (3/3); Pen: Ricardo Croy 11', 35', 60', 84' (4/5); Tiaan Marx (0/1) | Attendance: 400; Referee: Quinton Immelman |

| 30 April 2011 | Golden Lions | 26–28 | Blue Bulls | Wits Rugby Stadium, Johannesburg |
| 14:30 | Try: Alwyn Hollenbach 10'; Dusty Noble 57'; Michael Bondesio 68'; Con: Elton Jantjies 69' (1/3); Pen: Elton Jantjies (0/2); André Pretorius 26', 40', 48' (3/4); Drop: André Pretorius (0/1); Hein Cronjé (0/1); Cards: Kevin Buys (yellow card) 43' to 53' | Report; Scoreboard | Try: Morné Mellett 22'; Sampie Mastriet 74'; Marnitz Boshoff 76'; Con: Marnitz Boshoff 23', 75' (2/3); Pen: Marnitz Boshoff 27', 42', 62' (3/4); Drop: Stefan Watermeyer (0/1); Marnitz Boshoff (0/1); Cards: Francois Venter (red card) 50' | Attendance: 1,000; Referee: Jason Jaftha |

| 30 April 2011 | Western Province | 19–21 | Sharks XV | Newlands Stadium, Cape Town |
| 16:20 | Try: JJ Engelbrecht 17'; Danie Poolman 76'; Con: Demetri Catrakilis (0/2); Pen: Demetri Catrakilis 33', 58', 64' (3/4) | Report; Scoreboard | Try: Mark Richards 13'; Cobus Reinach 36'; Con: Jacques-Louis Potgieter 37' (1/2); Pen: Jacques-Louis Potgieter 29', 43', 67' (3/5) | Attendance: 10,000; Referee: Leon van der Merwe |

=== Semi-finals ===
| 6 May 2011 | Pampas XV | 41–26 | Sharks XV | Olën Park, Potchefstroom |
| 16:30 | Try: Julio Farías Cabello 23'; Nicolás Bruzzone 45'; Juan Imhoff 51', 75'; Joaquín Tuculet 64'; Agustín Gosio 67'; Con: Nicolás Sánchez 25', 46', 65', 68' (4/6); Pen: Nicolás Sánchez 42' (1/1) | Report; Scoreboard | Try: Roscko Speckman 5'; Mark Richards 80'; Con: Gouws Prinsloo 6', 80' (2/2); Pen: Gouws Prinsloo 1', 38', 40', 60' (4/7) | Attendance: 300; Referee: Joey Salmans |

| 7 May 2011 | Griquas | 34–47 | Blue Bulls | Griqua Park, Kimberley |
| 14:20 | Try: Rocco Jansen 17'; Earl Rose 55'; Jandré Blom 60'; Hendrik Roodt 66'; Wilmaure Louw 74'; Con: Rudi Vogt 18', 56', 61' (3/5); Pen: Rudi Vogt 32' (1/3); Drop: Earl Rose (0/1); Cards: Rocco Jansen (yellow card) 28' to 38' | Report; Scoreboard | Try: Sampie Mastriet 28'; Stefan Watermeyer 35'; Juandré Kruger 39'; CJ Stander 70'; Con: Marnitz Boshoff 29', 36', 71' (3/4); Pen: Marnitz Boshoff 4', 20', 24', 51', 63', 77' (6/6); Drop: Marnitz Boshoff 8' (1/1) | Attendance: 1,000; Referee: Stuart Berry |

=== Final ===
| 13 May 2011 | Pampas XV | 14–9 | Blue Bulls | Olën Park, Potchefstroom |
| 19:00 | Try: Agustín Gosio 25'; Con: Nicolás Sánchez (0/1); Pen: Nicolás Sánchez 11', 43' (2/3); Santiago González Iglesias 57' (1/2); Drop: Santiago González Iglesias (0/1) | Report; Scoreboard | Pen: Marnitz Boshoff 50', 62', 77' (3/4) | Attendance: 2,000; Referee: Stuart Berry |

== Winners ==
2011
Vodacom Cup
CHAMPIONS
Pampas XV
1st title

== Top scorers ==
The following sections contain only points and tries which have been scored in competitive games in the 2011 Vodacom Cup.

=== Top points scorers ===
| Rank | Player | Team | Points |
|---|---|---|---|
| 1 | Lionel Cronjé | Western Province | 95 |
| 2 | Marnitz Boshoff | Blue Bulls | 87 |
| 3 | Nicolás Sánchez | Pampas XV | 85 |
| 4 | Louis Strydom | Free State Cheetahs | 81 |
| 5 | Coenie van Wyk | Pumas | 75 |
| 6 | Willie le Roux | Boland Cavaliers | 74 |
| 7 | Rudi Vogt | Griquas | 71 |
| 8 | Tiaan van Wyk | Griffons | 66 |
| 9 | Santiago González Iglesias | Pampas XV | 65 |
| 10 | Kyle Hendricks | Falcons | 56 |

Source: South African Rugby Union

=== Top try scorers ===
| Rank | Player | Team | Tries |
|---|---|---|---|
| 1 | JJ Engelbrecht | Western Province | 10 |
| 1 | Juan Imhoff | Pampas XV | 10 |
| 3 | Agustín Gosio | Pampas XV | 8 |
| 4 | Kobus de Kock | Sharks XV | 7 |
| 4 | Howard Noble | SWD Eagles | 7 |
| 4 | Wesley Wilkins | Griquas | 7 |
| 7 | Wilmaure Louw | Griquas | 6 |
| 7 | Thabang Molefe | Griffons | 6 |
| 7 | Mark Richards | Sharks XV | 6 |
| 7 | Joaquín Tuculet | Pampas XV | 6 |

Source: South African Rugby Union

== See also ==
- Vodacom Cup
- 2011 Currie Cup Premier Division
- 2011 Currie Cup First Division
