= Mark Richards (rugby union) =

South African rugby union player (born 1989)

- Born: 9 September 1989 (age 37) Springs, South Africa
- Height: 1.74 m (5 ft 8 1/2 in)
- Weight: 82 kg (181 lb; 12 st 13 lb)
- School: Michaelhouse, KwaZulu-Natal

Rugby union career
- Position: Winger / Fullback
- Current team: Sharks XV
Youth career
- 2007–2010: Sharks
Senior career
Years	Team	Apps	(Points)
2010–2011	Sharks (Currie Cup)	21	(40)
2014–2015	Golden Lions	16	(5)
2015	Lions	1	(0)
2016–present	Sharks (Currie Cup)	0	(0)
- Correct as of 2 November 2015
International career
Years	Team	Apps	(Points)
2011–2014	South Africa Sevens		
- Correct as of 18 September 2014
Medal record
Men's rugby sevens
Representing South Africa
World Games
Gold medal – first place	2013 Cali	Team competition
Commonwealth Games
Gold medal – first place	2014 Glasgow	Team competition

Mark Richards (born 9 September 1989) is a South African rugby union player, currently playing with the Sharks XV. His regular position is winger.

Richards also won gold medals as part of the South African Sevens side that won the rugby sevens tournaments at the 2013 World Games and the 2014 Commonwealth Games.

== Career ==
=== Youth ===
Richards went to Michaelhouse school in KwaZulu-Natal and earned a call-up to the KwaZulu-Natal Under-18 side that played at the Academy Week competition in 2007.

Richards then joined the Durban-based Sharks academy and played for the Sharks U19 side in the 2008 Under-19 Provincial Championship and for the Sharks U21 side in the 2009 and 2010 Under-21 Provincial Championships. The latter season also saw Richards scoring a hat-trick in their 106–3 victory over Boland U21 in Durban.

=== Sharks ===
Richards made his first class debut for the Sharks XV during the 2010 Vodacom Cup competition when he started their match against the Border Bulldogs. He appeared in all nine of their matches in the competition (starting eight of those), failing to score any points for his side as they reached the Semi-final of the competition.

Richards returned to the Sharks XV side for the 2011 Vodacom Cup competition, scoring six tries in six starts for the side, including two in their match against the Leopards in Durban. He finished as the Sharks' second-highest try scorer behind Kobus de Kock and joint-7th overall. He also made his Currie Cup debut in 2011; he started four of their matches during the season – a 35–16 victory over the Blue Bulls in Durban, a 23–22 victory over the Pumas in Nelspruit, a 43–34 home victory over the Free State Cheetahs – which also saw Richards score his first Currie Cup try in the fourth minute of the match – and a 43–22 defeat to Griquas in Kimberley.

=== Sevens ===
At the end of 2010, Richards was included in the South African Sevens team for the 2010 Dubai Sevens leg of the 2010–11 IRB Sevens World Series. He appeared in a further three tournaments during the 2010–11 season and in five tournaments in the 2011–12 IRB Sevens World Series. A chest injury and an Achilles tendon injury ruled him out of the entire 2012–13 IRB Sevens World Series, but he returned to the team for the 2013 World Games in Cali, Colombia, where he helped them win the gold medal match against Argentina, scoring a try and a conversion to secure a 33–24 victory.

Richards played in three tournaments during the 2013–14 IRB Sevens World Series before winning another gold medal with the team, this time at the 2014 Commonwealth Games, where South Africa beat New Zealand 17–12 in the final.

=== Golden Lions ===
In 2014, Richards made a return to the 15-man version of the game when he joined the Golden Lions during the 2014 Currie Cup Premier Division. He made his debut for the Lions during their Round Five match against Gauteng rivals the Blue Bulls.

=== Southern Kings ===
At the end of 2015, Richards was one of a number of players that joined the Southern Kings prior to their return to Super Rugby for the 2016 season. However, the Eastern Province Kings – the provincial union that was supposed to administer the Super Rugby team – suffered serious financial problems and the South African Rugby Union stepped in to assist the Super Rugby franchise; however, Richards was not one of the players contracted by SARU to represent the Southern Kings. After being unpaid for several months, he was one of eighteen players involved in submitting an application to get Eastern Province Rugby liquidated in an attempt to recoup unpaid salary payments.

=== Sharks ===
Richards returned to Durban and was named in the Sharks XV squad for the 2016 Currie Cup qualification series.
