= Yvan Watremez =

French rugby union player (born 1989)

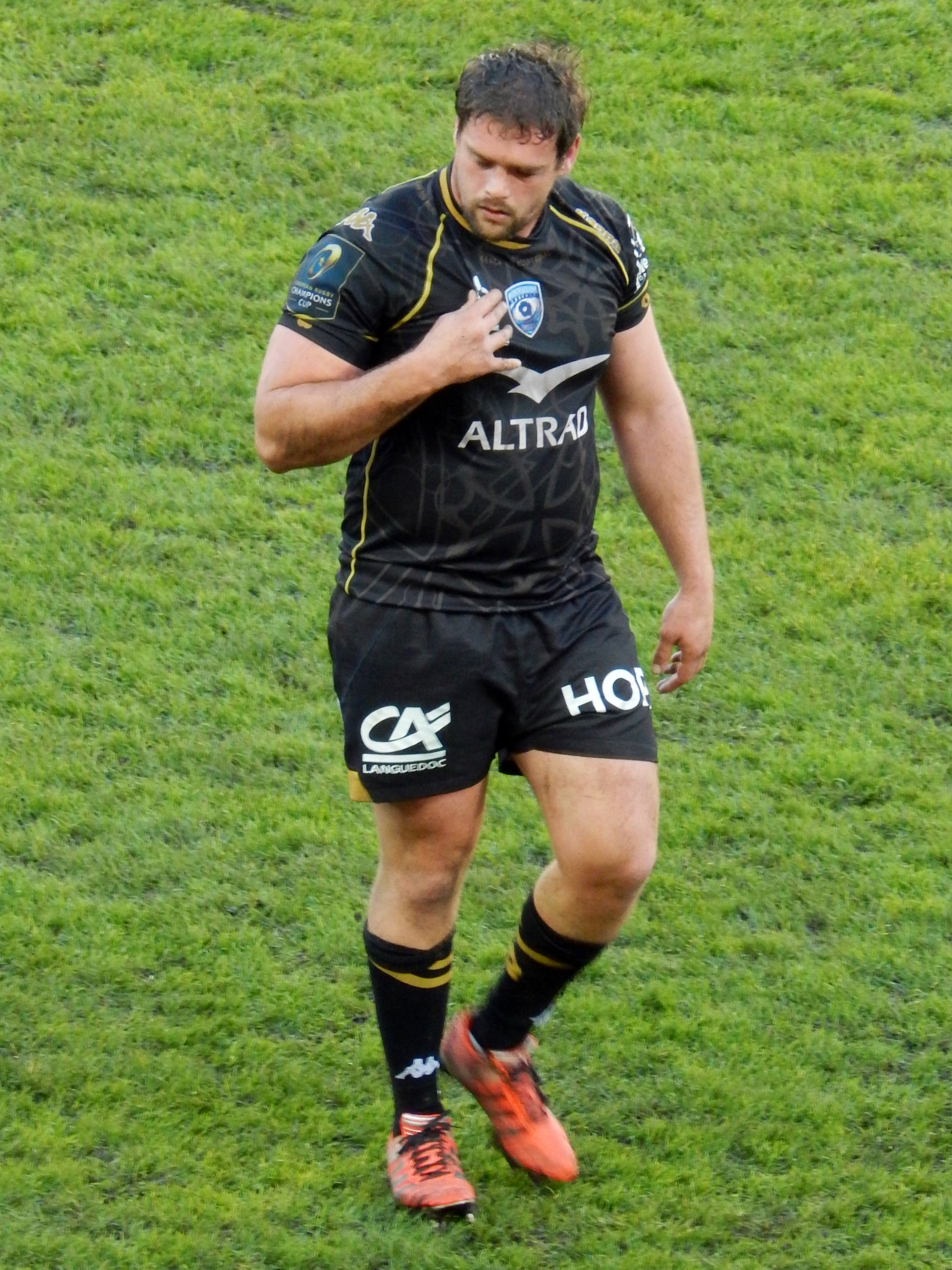
- Born: 21 April 1989 (age 37) Foix, France
- Height: 1.87 m (6 ft 1 1/2 in)
- Weight: 110 kg (17 st 5 lb; 243 lb)

Rugby union career
- Position: Prop
Senior career
Years	Team	Apps	(Points)
2010–2012	Biarritz Olympique	27	(0)
2012–19	Montpellier HR	158	(10)
2019-	Biarritz Olympique	8	(0)
- Correct as of 13 December 2016
International career
Years	Team	Apps	(Points)
2012–	France	1	(0)
- Correct as of 13 December 2016

Yvan Watremez (born 21 April 1989) is a French rugby union player. His position is Prop and he currently plays for Montpellier Hérault in the Top 14. He began his career with Biarritz Olympique before moving to Montpellier in 2012. He made his international debut during France's 2012 tour of Argentina.
