= Pascal Papé =

French rugby union player (born 1980)

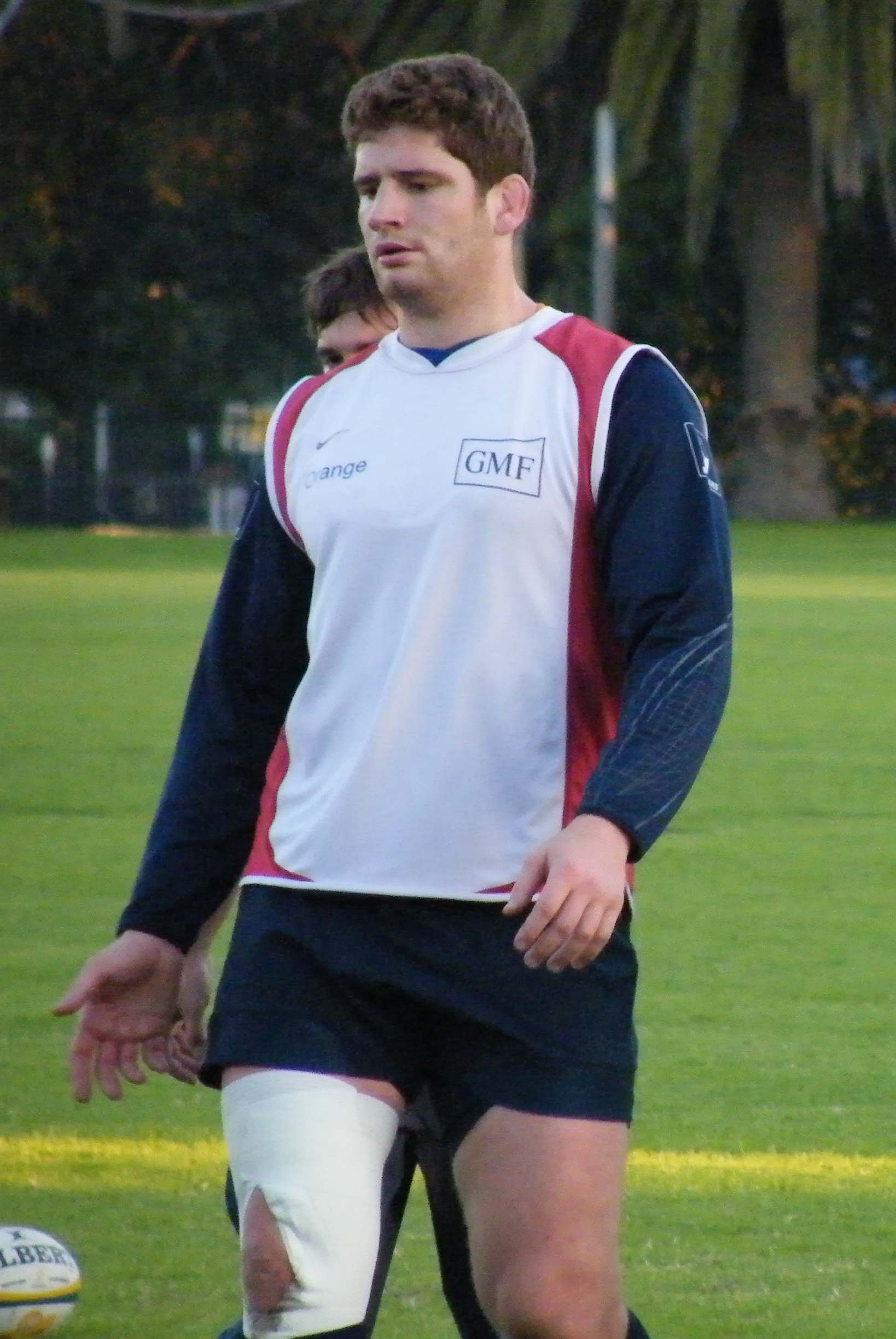
- Born: 5 October 1980 (age 46) Lyon, France
- Height: 1.95 m (6 ft 5 in)
- Weight: 122 kg (19 st 3 lb; 269 lb)

Rugby union career
- Position: Lock
Amateur team(s)
Years	Team	Apps	(Points)
1997–1998	Givors		
Senior career
Years	Team	Apps	(Points)
1998–2006	Bourgoin	85	(75)
2006–2007	Castres	27	(20)
2007–2017	Stade Français	192	(100)
International career
Years	Team	Apps	(Points)
2004–2015	France	65	(25)

Pascal Papé ([pas.kal pa.pe]; born 5 October 1980) is a former French rugby union footballer.

Papé played as a lock, and currently most recently represented Stade Français in club rugby, after spending many years at Bourgoin. He also spent one season at Castres Olympique. He earned his first test cap for France against Ireland in the 2004 Six Nations Championship, scoring a try in the 35–17 victory.

Papé was overlooked for the 2007 Rugby World Cup, and under new coach Marc Lièvremont he struggled to hold down a regular place in the starting line-up. He was a member of the squad that won the Grand Slam during the 2010 Six Nations Championship, but made just one appearance during the 2011 Six Nations Championship, and that was off the bench against Wales. However, he was selected as part of the provisional squad for the 2011 Rugby World Cup. Papé's subsequent form saw him elevated into the starting line-up for the games against England, Wales and New Zealand, in which he performed admirably. He was in the starting XV in the 2011 Rugby World Cup final, which saw the All Blacks win narrowly 8–7.

From 2012, he was elevated to Vice Captain behind Thierry Dusautoir, by newly appointed head coach Philippe Saint-André. He was named Captain for the 2012 France rugby union tour of Argentina and the 2012 end-of-year rugby union internationals. The end of year rugby tests were a great point in French rugby, haven beaten Australia 33–6, Argentina 39–22 and Samoa 22–14. Subsequently, Papé was retained as captain for the 2013 Six Nations Championship, but later replaced by Thierry Dusautoir following injury. France finished 6th that Championship.
