= Facundo Barrea =

Argentine rugby union player (born 1989)

- Born: 10 March 1989 (age 37) Córdoba, Argentina
- Height: 5 ft 11 in (180 cm)
- Weight: 191 lb (87 kg)

Rugby union career
- Position: Wing
International career
Years	Team	Apps	(Points)
2012	Argentina	4	(40)

Facundo Barrea (born 10 March 1989) is an Argentine former international rugby union player.

Born in Córdoba, Barrea was a winger and played his rugby for hometown club Córdoba Athletic.

Barrea made his first Pumas appearances at the 2012 South American Rugby Championship, where he crossed for eight tries from three fixtures, including six in a single match against Brazil in Santiago. He was subsequently selected by the Pumas for their two-Test home series against France. After being an unused substitute in the first match, Barrea came into the starting XV for the second Test, replacing Belisario Agulla.

== See also ==
- List of Argentina national rugby union players
