= Wenceslas Lauret =

France international rugby union player (born 1989)

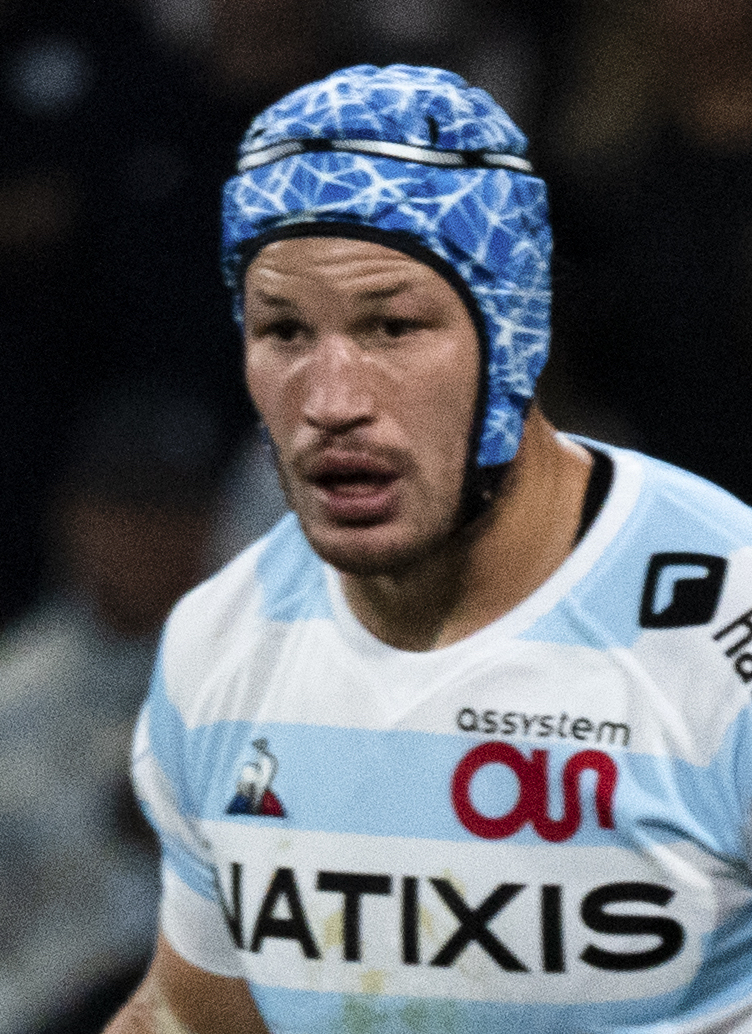
- Lauret playing for Racing 92 in 2019
- Born: 28 March 1989 (age 37) Tarbes, France
- Height: 1.88 m (6 ft 2 in)
- Weight: 102 kg (16 st 1 lb; 225 lb)

Rugby union career
- Position: Flanker / Lock
Senior career
Years	Team	Apps	(Points)
2008–2013	Biarritz	85	(30)
2013–	Racing 92	131	(55)
- Correct as of 27 October 2018
International career
Years	Team	Apps	(Points)
2010–2019	France	27	(5)
- Correct as of 20 October 2019

Wenceslas Lauret (born 28 March 1989) is a rugby union footballer, who plays for Racing 92 in the Top 14 French league. His usual position is flanker, but he can also play Lock.

== Career ==
Lauret first arose on the professional scene during the 2007–08 Top 14 season for Biarritz Olympique. Although during this season, he played at academy level playing for the under 20s side. During that year, he was selected for the France U20s side to play in the inaugural IRB Junior World Championship in Wales. He made two appearances for the U20s side, playing against Japan U20s and Italy U20s - winning both matches 53–17 and 32–14 respectively. After being promoted to the senior Biarritz side in 2008, he went on to play seven times during the 2008–09 season. His first professional appearance was on 26 August 2008 in a 29–22 victory against Bourgoin. In June 2009, he was selected again to represent France U20s in the 2009 IRB Junior World Championship. He played in every pool game to come second in that pool - the only loss was to South Africa U20s which they lost 43–27. He played in the 5th Place Play-offs semi-final against Samoa U20s. But was however not selected for the play-off match against Wales U20s, in what was a 68–13 win for France to come 5th in that tournament.

During the 2009–10 Top 14 season, he suffered an injury in late October, thus ruling him out of selection for the French national team for the 2009 end-of-year rugby union internationals. He returned in March 2010 to play a further 4 matches in that Top 14 Season. In addition to this, he played 5 matches during the 2009–10 Heineken Cup, where he started in both the quarter-finals and semi-finals against the Ospreys and Munster. Most notably, he started at Openside in the French derby 2010 Heineken Cup Final at the Stade de France. But Biarritz were unable to turn over French Giants Toulouse, losing 21–19.

On 19 May 2010, he was selected by Marc Lièvremont for the France National side to tour South Africa and Argentina. He made his debut on the 12 June at Newlands Stadium, starting in the 42–17 defeat. He didn't represent France again until June 2012, during the 2012 French tour to Argentina where he played in both matches. At the end of the 2012–13 Top 14 season, Lauret signed to play for Racing Métro, who he made his debut for on 23 August 2013 against Toulon - losing 41–14. During the 2013-14 Season, he returned to French national duties, and was part of the 2014 Six Nations Championship squad that narrowly lost the title to Ireland and England.

== Honours ==
(France) Racing 92

- Top 14: 2015–16
