= Philippe Saint-André =

French rugby union player (born 1967)

- Born: Philippe Georges Saint-André; 19 April 1967 (age 59) Romans-sur-Isère, France
- Height: 5 ft 11 in (1.80 m)
- Weight: 14 st 5 lb (91 kg)

Rugby union career
- Position: Wing
Amateur team(s)
Years	Team	Apps	(Points)
–1988	US Romanaise		
1988–1997	AS Montferrand		
Senior career
Years	Team	Apps	(Points)
1997–1999	Gloucester	38	(70)
International career
Years	Team	Apps	(Points)
1990–1997	France	69	(152)
Coaching career
- Years: Team
- 1998–2002: Gloucester
- 2002–2004: CS Bourgoin-Jallieu
- 2004–2009: Sale Sharks
- 2009–2011: Toulon
- 2012–2015: France
- 2021–2023: Montpellier
- 2025–: Provence

Philippe Georges Saint-André ([fi.lip ʒɔʁʒ sɛ̃.t‿ɑ̃.dʁe]; born 19 April 1967) is a former French rugby union footballer and currently the manager of Pro D2 side Provence. He earned 69 test caps for France between 1990 and 1997. His preferred position was wing but he could also play at centre. After retiring, Saint-André has found success as a rugby coach in both England and France. He was serving as director of rugby at Toulon before being announced as the successful candidate for head coach of France from 2011 to 2015. He formally took charge of the national team on 1 December 2011, and left his post on 17 October 2015 following a 13–62 loss to New Zealand.

== Playing career ==
=== Club ===
Nicknamed Le Goret ("the piglet") for his shuffling style of running, Saint-André began his rugby career at US Romanaise before joining AS Montferrand in 1988. He played with the club until 1997, and while with the club Montferrand appeared in the 1993–94 French Championship final against Toulouse, with Toulouse winning 32–16. In 1997, Saint-André crossed the Channel to join English Premiership club Gloucester and played with them until retiring in 1999.

=== Country ===
Saint-André made his test debut as a centre in the famous 12–6 loss to Romania in Auch in May 1990. That loss saw the resignation of the head coach Jacques Fouroux. He started on the wing in France's 28–19 win over Australia during their 1990 tour, which was France's first win in Australia since 1972. He became a constant player under Daniel Dubroca, featuring in all matches of the 1991 Five Nations Championship, scoring 2 tries to be joint top try scorer of the Championship. He was selected for the 1991 Rugby World Cup, playing and starting in every game. Though the 1991 World Cup was and still is France's worst result in the World Cup haven been knocked out in the Quarter-final by England.

He continued to be a constant starter in the French team, even under newly appointed coach Pierre Berbizier. Saint-André started in France's next 17 games, which included the 1993 Five Nations Championship winning campaign. During the 1994 Five Nations Championship, he replaced Olivier Roumat as captain for the final match of the Championship against Scotland, winning 20-12 and scoring a try. He remained as captain for the 1994 New Zealand test series, winning 2–0, which included France's first win over New Zealand since 1986 and their first win in New Zealand since 1979. Towards the end of the second test at Eden Park in Auckland, France were trailing the All Blacks 20–16 and were pinned back deep in their own end by a tactical kick. Saint-André fielded the kick and began a counter-attack that ended in a spectacular try to fullback Jean-Luc Sadourny, securing a memorable 23–20 victory. After the match, Saint-André called the play that led to the winning try "a counter-attack from the end of the world", and it would be permanently enshrined in rugby lore as the "try from the end of the world".

He was captain for the 1995 Rugby World Cup, of which France finished third in the tournament, which included a narrow 19–15 loss to hosts South Africa in the Semi-final, before beating England in the Third-place play-off 19–9. On 11 November 1995, France beat New Zealand for a third consecutive time winning 22–15.

Saint-André was injured for 1997 Five Nations Championship and missed out on France's first Grand Slam victory since 1987. On his return, he started against Italy in the 1995–97 FIRA Trophy final, which saw Italy win 40–32 in Grenoble. This was Italy's first ever win over the French.

Saint-André captained France in 34 test matches, winning 25 of them.

Saint-André's final international appearance was in November 1997 at Parc des Princes against South Africa. The match would also be the last in which Parc des Princes served as France's main venue. Unfortunately for Saint-André, South Africa won the match 52–10. He ended his career as France's second-highest try scorer with 32 tries, a position he held until Vincent Clerc took it in 2012 against Argentina.

Saint-André has a younger brother, Raphaël, who also played club rugby as an outside centre. They played together at Montferrand and briefly at Gloucester. Both brothers participated in the French Championship final and the Challenge Yves du Manoir in 1994.

He is one of six captains to lead his side to a test series win on New Zealand soil, along with Philip J. Nel (1937 Springboks), Trevor Allan (1949 Australia), John Dawes (1971 British Lions), Andrew Slack (1986 Australia) and Johnny Sexton (2022 Ireland).

== Coaching career ==
=== At Gloucester and Bourgoin, 1999-2004 ===
Saint-André's coaching career began in 1998 when he took up the position of Director of Rugby at Gloucester haven served 2 years there as a player. During his three-year reign, he attracted controversy for, among other things, recruiting a large number of French-based players and coaches. However, he turned Gloucester into one of the best clubs in England. In just his second year in charge, he led Gloucester to third in the table, with 43 points. However, in the 2000–01 season, Gloucester dropped back down the table, finishing in seventh on the table. However, Gloucester did top their pool in the Heineken Cup, where they made it to the semi-final, losing 19–15 to Leicester Tigers, haven beaten Cardiff in the Quarter-final 21–15. In his final season in charge, Gloucester returned to the top four of the table, though, Philippe Saint-André parted ways with the team in February 2002 ahead of schedule. He was however responsible for Gloucester winning all their pool matches in the European Challenge Cup, and taking them out of the quarter finals, beating Ebbw Vale 46–11.

He returned to France later that year, acting as head coach for CS Bourgoin-Jallieu. In his debut season, he led Bourgoin to third in their pool during the first round, but was unable to get out of the group stages in the second round of the season. He led Bourgoin to top of the table in the first round of the 2003–04 Top 16 season. But yet again his tenure came to an abrupt end when he was sacked in January 2004 after he admitted that he was a candidate to succeed Steve Hansen as coach of Wales.

=== At Sale and Toulon, 2004-2011 ===
Two months later, Saint-André again went across the Channel to sign a three-year contract with the Sale Sharks. Unlike at Gloucester, his role as director would be less hands-on and focus more on recruitment and development. While Saint-Andre was in this hands-off recruitment and development role, Sale would enjoy the most successful period in their history so far. In his first season, Sale finished third in the table, which meant they would face London Wasps in the Semi finals, but lost 43–22. Though in May 2005, they won their second European Challenge Cup when they defeated French club Pau 27–3. Almost exactly a year later, after finishing on top of the table during the regular Premiership season, Sale won their first English play-off championship with a 45–20 victory over Leicester at Twickenham. Saint-André was given the opportunity to coach France after the 2007 Rugby World Cup, but turned it down when the French Rugby Federation rejected his request to have Brive coach Laurent Seigne join his staff. and so the job was given to Marc Lièvremont. In the 2007–08 season, Sale made it all the way to the semi-final of the European Challenge Cup, when they lost to Bath 36–14. In December 2008, Saint-André confirmed that he would be standing down as director of rugby at Sale when the season was over. He was succeeded in the role of director by Sale's then head coach Kingsley Jones.

After nearly two months of speculation on where Saint-André would go next, French club Toulon announced that they had signed him as sporting president, starting his duties officially on 1 July 2009. In his first season in charge, Toulon finished second in the table after the regular season, however losing to Clermont 29–35 after extra time in the semi-final. Toulon also made it to the final of the 2009–10 European Challenge Cup, but lost to Cardiff Blues 28–21 at the Stade Vélodrome. In his second and final season in charge, Toulon found themselves back down the table in 8th, with only 15 wins. However, they were only 2 points behind the top 6, who were on 72 points. Toulon made it to the semi-final of the Heineken Cup that season, but lost to Perpignan 29–25.

In August 2011 it was announced that Saint-André would replace Lièvremont as head coach of France after the 2011 Rugby World Cup, thus finishing his tenure with Toulon. Saint-André was present at the club while some big names were signed, the likes of Jonny Wilkinson, Juan Martín Fernández Lobbe, Felipe Contepomi and Pierre Mignoni.

=== Coach of France, 2012-2015 ===
Although the French reached the final of the 2011 World Cup, their campaign would also be remembered for the disharmony that marred relations between Marc Lièvremont and the players. In light of this, Saint-André's immediate priorities were to restore clear and open communication between players and management, and to restore pride to the image of French rugby:

"The players must also accept that the France team is the window to French rugby and the image and message we send is important. Many youngsters take up the game because of what they see in the team and inspirational players like Thierry Dusautoir, and we must make sure this image is always good. I have spoken to all the players, individually, about these things".

He also tried to persuade the French Rugby Federation to fall in line with the Home Unions and allow France a full two weeks to prepare for the Six Nations. Unlike the Home Unions, French players are still required to play for their clubs on every other weekend.

Saint-André's first game in charge of Les Bleus was against Italy at Stade de France on 4 February 2012, which France won 30–12. However, after a draw against Ireland and then losses to England and Wales, France finished the 2012 Six Nations Championship in fourth place. In June 2012, France drew their test series with Argentina, 1–all, haven lost the first test 23–20, but won the second test 49–10, which was France's first win in Argentina since 1998. During their 2012 November campaign, France won all 3 tests, which included a 33–6 win over Australia, which ended Australia's 7-year long winning streak against France.

In the 2013 Six Nations Championship, France lost their first three games, 18–23 against Italy, 6–16 against Wales and 13–23 against England. The team managed a draw, 13–13, against Ireland in Dublin and a last day 23–16 win against Scotland to finish the championship in last place. This was the first time that France picked up the wooden spoon in the Six Nations, but the last time they had finished last was during the 1999 Five Nations Championship. France later went on to lose 3–0 to New Zealand, during their 2013 tour, which included a 30–0 loss, the first time France has failed to score any points against New Zealand. France did however beat Super Rugby franchise Blues, 38–15, but it was not an official test match. France again lost to New Zealand, 26–19, during their 2013 November campaign, where during that campaign, they only picked up a single victory, coming against Tonga 38–18.

During the 2014 Six Nations Championship, France picked up their first win over England since 2011, beating them 26–24 in the opening week of the Championship. They additionally beat Italy 30–10 and Scotland 19–17. Despite their 27–6 loss to Wales, France was still in contention of winning the title going into the final week. However, due to England's 52–11 win over Italy in the first game of the final day, France needed to beat Ireland by more than 70 points to secure the title, but Ireland won the game 20–22 to claim the title. In June of that year, France lost their second consecutive test series, losing to Australia 3–0 during their 2014 Tour. They lost the first test 50–23, before narrowly losing the second test 6–0, which was the first time France had failed to score any points against the Wallabies. The third test was a 39–13 win to Australia. France did gain some revenge during their 2014 November campaign, when they beat Australia 29–26, though they later went on to lose to Argentina for the first time on home soil since 2007, 18–13.

Philippe Saint-André led France to fourth in the 2015 Six Nations Championship for the second consecutive year. Their only wins came against Scotland 15–8, and Italy 29–0. The Italian win, was France's first win over Italy in Italy, since 2009. Like in 2014, France were still in contention ton win the title, but they needed Wales and Ireland to lose their respective matches and for France to beat England. However, none of these scenarios happened, which meant France finished fourth. On 31 May 2015, it was announced that Philippe Saint-André would be replaced by Guy Novès after the 2015 Rugby World Cup.

During France's Rugby World Cup Warm-ups, France earned a narrow 25–20 victory over England in Paris, though had lost the return fixture in London 19–14. Their final Warm-up saw France beat Scotland 19–16. During the 2015 Rugby World Cup, it was reported that the players launched a "mutiny" against Philippe Saint-André following France's 24–9 loss to Ireland. It was reported that the players coached themselves in the lead up to their quarter-final clash with New Zealand, which saw the end to Saint-André's tenure with France, following a record defeat of 62–13 in Cardiff.

==== International matches as head coach ====
Note: World Rankings column shows the World Ranking Wales was placed at on the following Monday after each of their matches.

Matches (2012–2015)
Matches	Date	Opposition	Venue	Score (Fra.–Opponent)	Competition	Captain	World Ranking
2012
1	4 February	Italy	Stade de France, Saint-Denis	30–12	Six Nations	Thierry Dusautoir	3rd
2	26 February	Scotland	Murrayfield Stadium, Edinburgh	23–17	Six Nations	Thierry Dusautoir	3rd
3	4 March	Ireland	Stade de France, Saint-Denis	17–17	Six Nations	Thierry Dusautoir	4th
4	11 March	England	Stade de France, Saint-Denis	22–24	Six Nations	Thierry Dusautoir	6th
5	17 March	Wales	Millennium Stadium, Cardiff	9–16	Six Nations	Thierry Dusautoir	6th
6	16 June	Argentina	Estadio Mario Alberto Kempes, Córdoba	20–23	Argentine test series	Pascal Papé	7th
7	23 June	Argentina	Estadio José Fierro, Tucumán	49–10	Argentine test series	Pascal Papé	5th
8	10 November	Australia	Stade de France, Saint-Denis	33–6	Autumn internationals	Pascal Papé	4th
9	17 November	Argentina	Stade Pierre-Mauroy, Lille	39–22	Autumn internationals	Pascal Papé	4th
10	24 November	Samoa	Stade de France, Saint-Denis	22–14	Autumn internationals	Pascal Papé	4th
2013
11	3 February	Italy	Stadio Olimpico, Rome	18–23	Six Nations	Pascal Papé	5th
12	9 February	Wales	Stade de France, Saint-Denis	6–16	Six Nations	Thierry Dusautoir	5th
13	23 February	England	Twickenham Stadium, London	13–23	Six Nations	Thierry Dusautoir	5th
14	9 March	Ireland	Aviva Stadium, Dublin	13–13	Six Nations	Thierry Dusautoir	6th
15	16 March	Scotland	Stade de France, Saint-Denis	23–16	Six Nations	Thierry Dusautoir	6th
16	8 June	New Zealand	Eden Park, Auckland	13–23	New Zealand test series	Thierry Dusautoir	6th
17	15 June	New Zealand	Rugby League Park, Christchurch	0–30	New Zealand test series	Thierry Dusautoir	5th
18	22 June	New Zealand	Yarrow Stadium, New Plymouth	9–24	New Zealand test series	Thierry Dusautoir	5th
19	9 November	New Zealand	Stade de France, Saint-Denis	19–26	Autumn internationals	Thierry Dusautoir	5th
20	16 November	Tonga	Stade Océane, Le Havre	38–18	Autumn internationals	Thierry Dusautoir	5th
21	23 November	South Africa	Stade de France, Saint-Denis	10–19	Autumn internationals	Thierry Dusautoir	6th
2014
22	1 February	England	Stade de France, Saint-Denis	26–24	Six Nations	Pascal Papé	5th
23	9 February	Italy	Stade de France, Saint-Denis	30–10	Six Nations	Pascal Papé	5th
24	21 February	Wales	Millennium Stadium, Cardiff	6–27	Six Nations	Pascal Papé	7th
25	8 March	Scotland	Murrayfield Stadium, Edinburgh	19–17	Six Nations	Pascal Papé	5th
26	15 March	Ireland	Stade de France, Saint-Denis	20–22	Six Nations	Pascal Papé	7th
27	7 June	Australia	Suncorp Stadium, Brisbane	23–50	Australian test series	Nicolas Mas	7th
28	14 June	Australia	Etihad Stadium, Melbourne	0–6	Australian test series	Thierry Dusautoir	7th
29	21 June	Australia	Allianz Stadium, Sydney	13–39	Australian test series	Thierry Dusautoir	7th
30	8 November	Fiji	Stade Vélodrome, Marseille	40–15	Autumn internationals	Thierry Dusautoir	6th
31	15 November	Australia	Stade de France, Saint-Denis	29–26	Autumn internationals	Thierry Dusautoir	6th
32	22 November	Argentina	Stade de France, Saint-Denis	13–18	Autumn internationals	Thierry Dusautoir	7th
2015
33	7 February	Scotland	Stade de France, Saint-Denis	15–8	Six Nations	Thierry Dusautoir	7th
34	14 February	Ireland	Aviva Stadium, Dublin	11–18	Six Nations	Thierry Dusautoir	7th
35	28 February	Wales	Stade de France, Saint-Denis	13–20	Six Nations	Thierry Dusautoir	7th
36	15 March	Italy	Stadio Olimpico, Rome	29–0	Six Nations	Thierry Dusautoir	7th
37	21 March	England	Twickenham Stadium, London	35–55	Six Nations	Thierry Dusautoir	7th
38	15 August	England	Twickenham Stadium, London	14–19	2015 RWC warm-ups	Pascal Papé	7th
39	22 August	England	Stade de France, Saint-Denis	25–20	2015 RWC warm-ups	Pascal Papé	7th
40	5 September	Scotland	Stade de France, Saint-Denis	19–16	2015 RWC warm-ups	Thierry Dusautoir	7th
41	19 September	Italy	Twickenham Stadium, London, England	32–10	2015 Rugby World Cup	Thierry Dusautoir	7th
42	23 September	Romania	Olympic Stadium, London, England	38–11	2015 Rugby World Cup	Dimitri Szarzewski	7th
43	1 October	Canada	Stadium mk, Milton Keynes, England	41–18	2015 Rugby World Cup	Thierry Dusautoir	6th
44	11 October	Ireland	Millennium Stadium, Cardiff, Wales	9–24	2015 Rugby World Cup	Thierry Dusautoir	7th
45	11 October	New Zealand	Millennium Stadium, Cardiff, Wales	13–62	2015 Rugby World Cup	Thierry Dusautoir	7th

==== Record by country ====
Opponent	Played	Won	Drew	Lost	Win ratio (%)	For	Against
Argentina	4	2	0	2	50%	121	73
Australia	5	2	0	3	40%	98	127
Canada	1	1	0	0	100%	41	18
England	6	2	0	4	33.33%	135	165
Fiji	1	1	0	0	100%	40	15
Ireland	5	0	2	3	0%	70	94
Italy	5	4	0	1	80%	139	55
New Zealand	5	0	0	5	0%	54	165
Romania	1	1	0	0	100%	38	11
Samoa	1	1	0	0	100%	22	14
Scotland	5	5	0	0	100%	99	74
South Africa	1	0	0	1	0%	10	19
Tonga	1	1	0	0	100%	38	18
Wales	4	0	0	4	0%	34	79
TOTAL	45	20	2	23	44.44%	939	927

==== Honours ====
- Giuseppe Garibaldi Trophy
  - Winners: 2012, 2014, 2015
- Trophée des Bicentenaires
  - Winners: 2012, Nov 2014

=== Other honors ===
Sale Sharks

- Guinness Premiership
  - Winners: 2006
- European Challenge Cup
  - Winners: 2005

Toulon

- European Challenge Cup
  - Runners-up: 2010

Montpellier

- European Challenge Cup
  - Winners: 2021
- Top 14
  - Winners: 2022

Sporting positions
Preceded by (France) Marc Lièvremont	French National Rugby Union Coach; 2011–2015	Succeeded by (France) Guy Novès
