= Christophe Samson =

French rugby union player

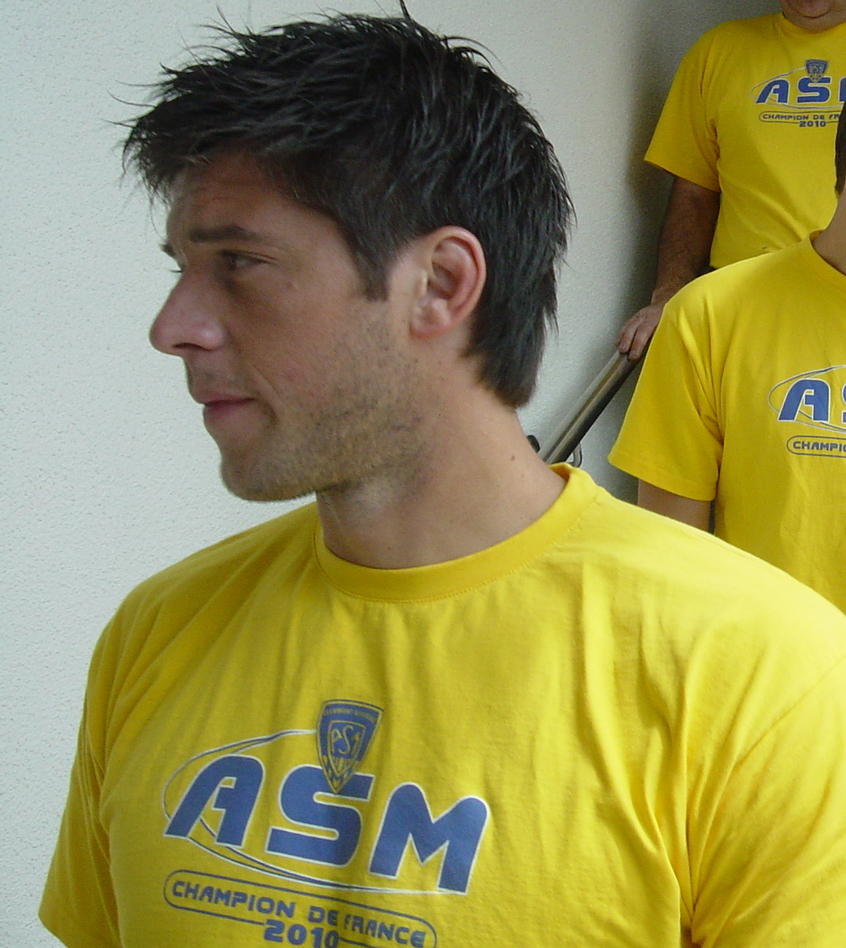
- Born: 1 March 1984 (age 42) Clermont-Ferrand, France
- Height: 1.98 m (6 ft 6 in)
- Weight: 109 kg (17 st 2 lb)

Rugby union career
- Position: Lock
Senior career
Years	Team	Apps	(Points)
2006–2007	La Rochelle	22	(10)
2007–2010	Clermont Auvergne	51	(5)
2010–2012	Toulon	47	(0)
2012–	Castres Olympique	88	(5)
- Correct as of 31 January 2015
International career
Years	Team	Apps	(Points)
2012–2013	France	5	(0)
- Correct as of 15 June 2013

Christophe Samson (born 1 March 1984) is a French rugby union player. His position is Lock and he currently plays for Castres Olympique in the Top 14. He began his career with La Rochelle in the Pro D2 before moving to home-town club Clermont Auvergne in 2007. He moved to Toulon in 2010. He made his international debut in June 2012 during France's 2012 tour of Argentina.

== Honours ==
=== Club ===
(France) Castres

- Top 14 (2): 2012–13, 2017–18
