= Brice Dulin =

French rugby union player

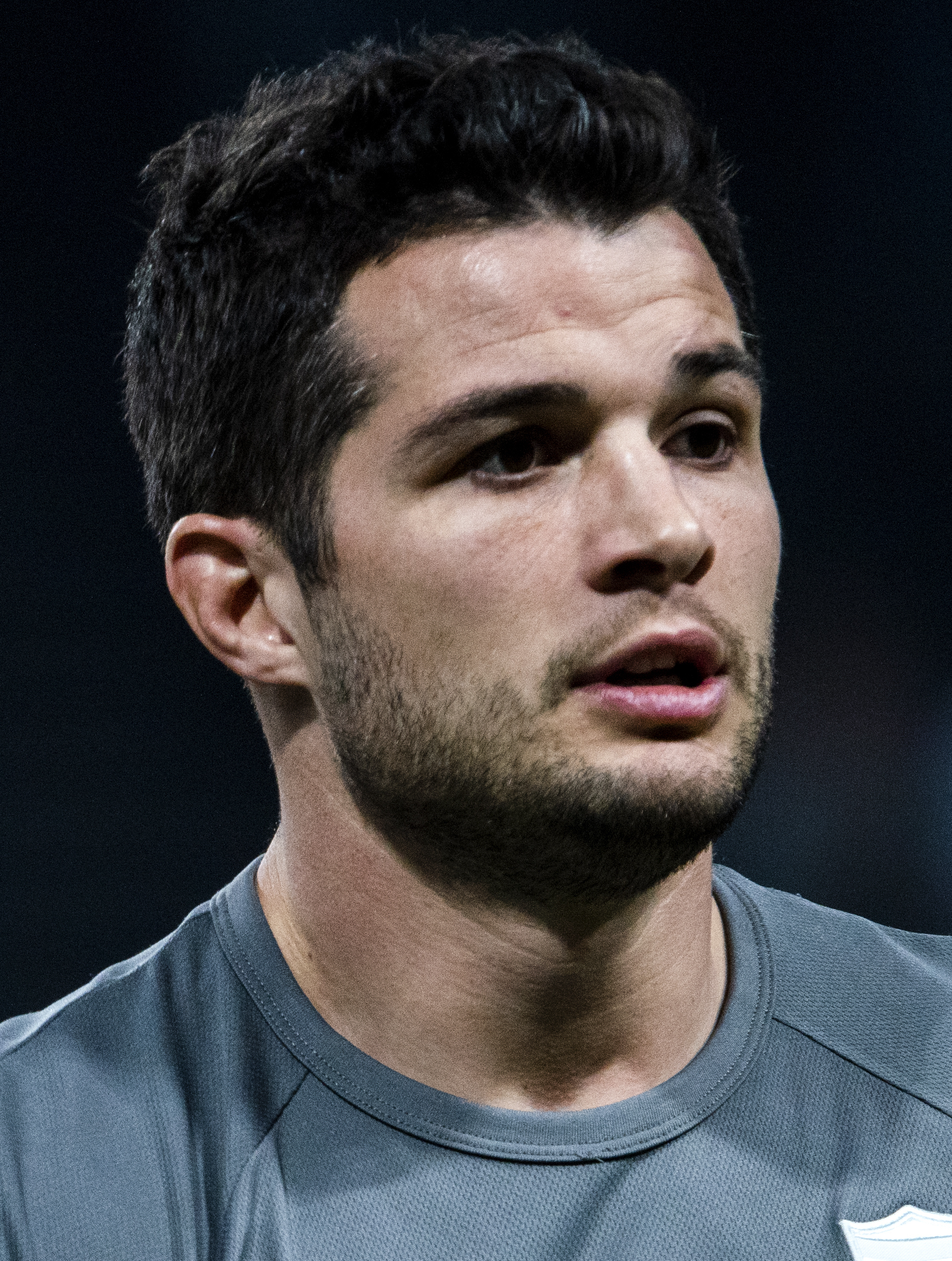
- Born: Brice Dulin; 13 April 1990 (age 36) Agen, France
- Height: 1.76 m (5 ft 9 1/2 in)
- Weight: 84 kg (185 lb; 13 st 3 lb)

Rugby union career
- Position: Fullback
- Current team: La Rochelle
Senior career
Years	Team	Apps	(Points)
2009–2012	Agen	62	(43)
2012–2014	Castres	43	(25)
2014–2020	Racing 92	128	(111)
2020–2025	La Rochelle	113	(55)
- Correct as of 27 May 2025
International career
Years	Team	Apps	(Points)
2010	France U20	7	(5)
2012–2023	France	37	(48)

Brice Dulin (born 13 April 1990) is a former French rugby union player. His usual position was fullback, and he last played for La Rochelle in the Top 14. He began his career at SU Agen, making his professional debut in 2009. He made his debut for France during their tour of Argentina in June 2012. He announced his retirement in April 2025 at the age of 34.

== Honours ==
=== Club ===
(France) Castres

- Top 14: 2012–13

(France) Racing 92

- Top 14: 2015–16

(France) La Rochelle

- European Rugby Champions Cup: 2021–2022
