= Dean Hopp =

South African rugby union player

- Full name: Dean Lionel John Hopp
- Born: 7 September 1982 (age 44) Heidelberg, South Africa
- Height: 1.66 m (5 ft 5 1/2 in)
- Weight: 120 kg (260 lb; 18 st 13 lb)
- School: Kairos Secondary School
- University: University of Port Elizabeth

Rugby union career
- Position: Prop
Amateur team(s)
Years	Team	Apps	(Points)
2015–present	Evergreens	4	(0)
Senior career
Years	Team	Apps	(Points)
2002–2003 & 2011–2016	SWD Eagles	66	(25)
2005	Mighty Elephants	19	(5)
2006–2008	Griquas	21	(15)
- Correct as of 9 October 2016
International career
Years	Team	Apps	(Points)
2002	South Africa Under-21	2	(0)
2012	South African Barbarians (South)	1	(0)
- Correct as of 29 July 2013

Dean Lionel John Hopp (born 7 September 1982 in Heidelberg) is a South African rugby union player, who most recently played with the SWD Eagles. His regular position is prop.

== Career ==
He made his first class debut for the SWD Eagles in 2002 and played for them in the 2002 and 2003 seasons. In 2005, he joined Port Elizabeth-based side the Mighty Elephants for the 2005 Vodacom Cup and 2005 Currie Cup competitions. He moved to Kimberley to join Griquas in 2006. He stayed there for three seasons and made 21 appearances. Prior to the 2011 Vodacom Cup, he returned to the SWD Eagles.

=== Representative rugby ===
He played for the victorious South African Under–21 team at the 2002 Under-21 Rugby World Cup. In 2012, he was selected in a South African Barbarians (South) team that played against England during their tour of South Africa.
