= Andrés Bordoy =

Argentine rugby union player (born 1982)

- Born: 30 December 1982 (age 43) Rosario, Argentina
- Height: 6 ft 2 in (188 cm)
- Weight: 252 lb (114 kg)

Rugby union career
- Position: Hooker
International career
Years	Team	Apps	(Points)
2012	Argentina	2	(0)

Andrés Bordoy (born 30 December 1982) is an Argentine rugby union coach and former international player.

A native of Rosario, Bordoy was a Duendes player, capped twice for the Pumas against France in 2012. He came on off the bench in their win over the French in Cordoba, then earned a place as starting hooker for the second Test match in Tucuman, replacing Bruno Postiglioni. His career included several seasons playing professional rugby in France with CA Brive, Stade Rochelais and Section Paloise.

Bordoy got early coaching experience during his time in Pau, as a scrum coach and physical assistant. He joined the Super Rugby side Jaguares in 2018 to coach their forwards and since 2021 has held the same role with the Pumas.

== See also ==
- List of Argentina national rugby union players
