= Miguel de Achával =

Argentine rugby union player (born 1982)

Miguel de Achaval
- Born: Miguel de Achaval; 8 May 1982 (age 44) Capital Federal, Argentina
- Height: 5 ft 11 in (1.80 m)
- Weight: 91 kg (14 st 5 lb)

Rugby union career
- Position: Number eight
International career
Years	Team	Apps	(Points)
2008-2010	Argentina	5	(5)

Miguel de Achaval (born 8 May 1982 in Buenos Aires) is an Argentine rugby union footballer. He plays in the back row. In May 2010 he was selected in a squad of over 40 players to represent Argentina in the two test Summer tour of Argentina.
