= Byron McGuigan =

Scotland international rugby union player

- Born: Byron McGuigan; 20 August 1989 (age 37) Walvis Bay, Namibia
- Height: 1.85 m (6 ft 1 in)
- Weight: 94 kg (14 st 11 lb; 207 lb)
- School: Milnerton High School

Rugby union career
- Position: Fullback/Wing
Senior career
Years	Team	Apps	(Points)
2010–2011	Border Bulldogs	13	(46)
2012–2014	Glasgow Warriors	20	(20)
2014–2016	Exeter Chiefs	21	(5)
2016–2023	Sale Sharks	105	(226)
- Correct as of 20 August 2022
Provincial / State sides
Years	Team	Apps	(Points)
2014	Bay of Plenty	10	(18)
- Correct as of 9 October 2014
International career
Years	Team	Apps	(Points)
2011–2012	Scotland Sevens	6	(45)
2017–2020	Scotland	10	(15)
- Correct as of 22 February 2020

Byron McGuigan (born 20 August 1989) is a rugby union outside centre or wing for Scotland in international rugby and for Sale Sharks in the English Premiership. He was born in Walvis Bay – then a South African exclave, but part of modern-day Namibia – and grew up in Cape Town, where he came through the Western Province academy before his first taste of first class rugby with the Border Bulldogs in 2010 and 2011. After a short spell with the Scotland Sevens team, he returned to fifteens rugby, playing for Glasgow Warriors, Bay of Plenty, Exeter Chiefs and Sale Sharks, culminating in a call-up to Scotland in 2017.

== Professional career ==
He played for Glasgow Warriors in the Pro12 having previously represented the Border Bulldogs in South Africa's Vodacom Cup competition.

It was announced in April 2014 that he had left Glasgow Warriors after 20 appearances and four tries over two seasons.

On 2 November 2014, Aviva Premiership side Exeter Chiefs announced that McGuigan would be joining them for the 2014–15 season on a one-year deal. On 27 July 2016, McGuigan signed a two-year deal with Premiership rivals Sale Sharks from the 2016–17 season.

== International career ==
McGuigan received his first call up to the senior Scotland squad by coach Gregor Townsend for the Autumn Internationals, making his debut against New Zealand as a second-half replacement. During his full debut the following week, McGuigan scored his first two international tries against Australia.

After a three-year stand-down period from international rugby, it was announced that McGuigan had switched counties to be able to represent the Namibia national team, but was not selected for the 2023 Rugby World Cup squad.

=== International tries ===
As of 19 November 2021

Try	Opposing team	Location	Venue	Competition	Date	Result	Score
1	Australia	Edinburgh, Scotland	Murrayfield Stadium	2017 end-of-year rugby union internationals	25 November 2017	Win	53 – 24
2	Australia	Edinburgh, Scotland	Murrayfield Stadium	2017 end-of-year rugby union internationals	25 November 2017	Win	53 – 24
3	Canada	Edmonton, Canada	Commonwealth Stadium	2018 June rugby union tests	9 June 2018	Win	10 – 48
