= Kobus de Kock =

South African rugby union player (born 1988)

- Full name: Jacobus Johannes de Kock
- Born: 29 March 1988 (age 38) Paarl, South Africa
- Height: 1.89 m (6 ft 2 1/2 in)
- Weight: 100 kg (15 st 10 lb; 220 lb)
- School: Paarl Boys' High School

Rugby union career
- Position: Full-back / Fly-half
- Current team: Golden Lions / Lions
Youth career
- 2007–2008: Sharks
Amateur team(s)
Years	Team	Apps	(Points)
2012	College Rovers		
2013	UJ	8	(69)
Senior career
Years	Team	Apps	(Points)
2011	Sharks (Currie Cup)	8	(49)
2011–2012	Lazio	17	(144)
2013–present	Golden Lions	12	(22)
2014–present	→ Leopards	9	(20)
- Correct as of 22 May 2015

Jacobus Johannes de Kock (born 29 March 1988 in Paarl) is a South African rugby union player, currently playing with the Golden Lions. His regular position is full-back or fly-half.

== Career ==
=== Youth, club and Varsity rugby ===
De Kock played schoolboy rugby for Paarl Boys' High School before enrolling at the Sharks academy in 2007. He played for the Sharks U19 side in 2007 and for the Sharks U21 side in 2008, missing out in 2009 due to injuries.

In 2013, he represented UJ in the Varsity Cup competition. He finished as the top scorer in the competition, scoring five tries and 22 conversions.

=== Sharks ===
He was included in the Sharks XV squad for the 2011 Vodacom Cup and made his first class debut in the opening match of the season against the Blue Bulls, scoring two tries to help the Sharks to a 30–19 victory. He scored a total of seven tries during the competition (which was joint fourth in the competition) and also scored seven conversions, to end the season with a total of 49 points.

=== Lazio ===
After the 2011 Vodacom Cup, De Kock moved to Italy, where he joined National Championship of Excellence side Lazio. He played in 17 matches for them, scoring 144 points to help Lazio finish in sixth place.

=== Return to South Africa ===
He returned to South Africa after one season at Lazio and played for Durban-based club side College Rovers. He scored a try and a 58-meter penalty late in the game to help College Rovers win the 2012 National Club Championships, the last edition of that tournament before being relaunched as the SARU Community Cup. He was also named Backline Player of the Tournament.

=== Golden Lions ===
He joined Johannesburg-based side Golden Lions for the 2013 season. In addition to playing in the Varsity Cup competition, he also made three appearances in the 2013 Vodacom Cup. His first taste of Currie Cup rugby came during the 2013 season, making substitute appearances against Western Province and Griquas.

He was also included in the Lions wider training squad for the 2014 Super Rugby season.
