= Rodrigo Bruno =

Argentine rugby union player (born 1987)

- Born: 15 May 1987 (age 39) Villa María, Argentina
- Height: 6 ft 3 in (1.91 m)
- Weight: 235 lb (107 kg)

Rugby union career
- Position: Number 8, Flanker
Amateur team(s)
Years	Team	Apps	(Points)
2013−2018	Atlético del Rosario	34	(45)
Senior career
Years	Team	Apps	(Points)
2012−2013	Pampas XV	13	(10)
2018−2019	Lazio	17	(20)
2020−	Selknam	2	(0)
International career
Years	Team	Apps	(Points)
2010−	Argentina	6	(5)

Rodrigo Bruno (born 15 May 1987) is an Argentinian professional Rugby union player. He plays as a flanker or Number 8 for the Selknam in Súper Liga Americana de Rugby having previously played professionally for Pampas XV & Lazio and internationally for Argentina.
