= Antoine Guillamon =

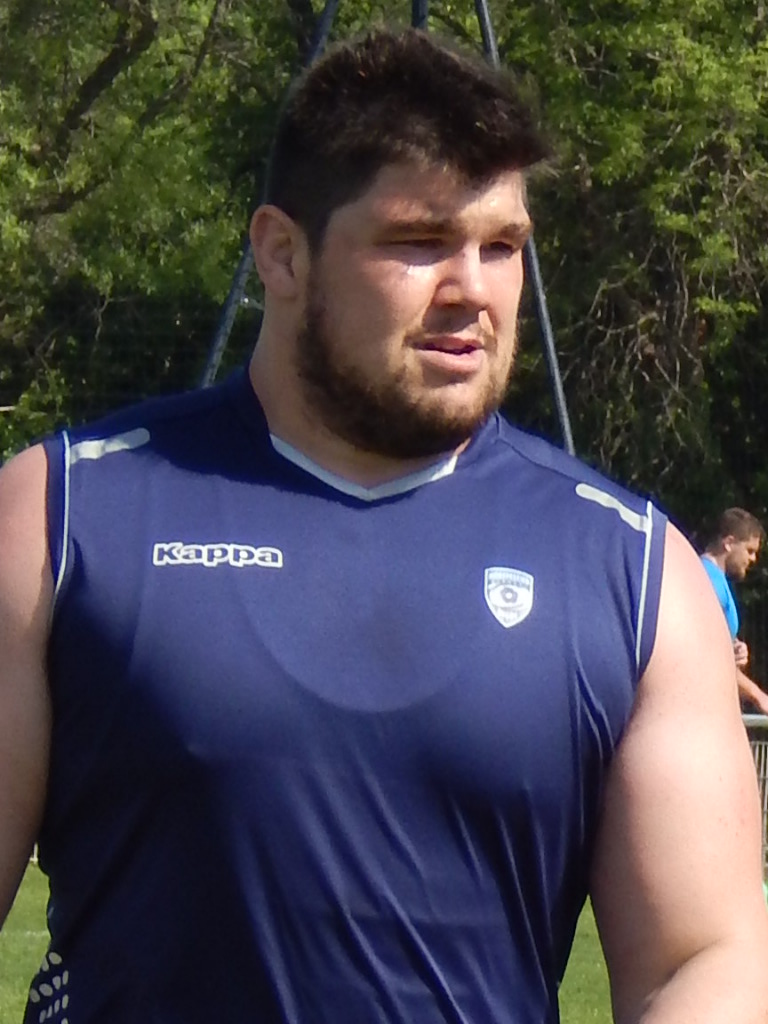
- Born: 4 June 1991 (age 35) Marsonnas, France
- Height: 1.93 m (6 ft 4 in)
- Weight: 139 kg (21 st 12 lb)

Rugby union career
- Position: Prop
Senior career
Years	Team	Apps	(Points)
2010–2012	Lyon OU	10	(0)
2012–2014	Stade Toulousain	9	(0)
2014–2016	Oyonnax Rugby	34	(0)
2016-	Montpellier	47	(0)
- Correct as of 20 April 2018

Antoine Guillamon (born 4 June 1991) is a French rugby union player. His position is Prop and he currently plays for Montpellier in the Top 14. He began his career with Lyon OU before moving to Stade Toulousain in 2012.
