= Agustín Gosio =

Argentine rugby union player (born 1983)

- Born: Agustín Gosio; March 17, 1983 (age 43) Argentina
- Height: 5 ft 9 in (175 cm)
- Weight: 89 kg (14 st 0 lb; 196 lb)
- School: Colegio Cardenal Newman, (Buenos Aires)

Rugby union career
- Position(s): Wing, centre
- Current team: Club Newman
Senior career
Years	Team	Apps	(Points)
2009-	Club Newman	24	(75)
2010–11	Pampas XV	16	(5)
2011–12	London Scottish	20	(20)
- Correct as of 26 September 2012
International career
Years	Team	Apps	(Points)
2011–	Argentina	3	(5)
- Correct as of 26 September 2012

Agustín Gosio (born March 17, 1983) is an Argentine rugby union footballer. He plays in the wing and centre position. Gosio started playing rugby for his secondary school, Colegio Cardenal Newman, moving afterwards for Club Newman. He was part of Pampas XV squad during 2010 and 2011 Vodacom Cup editions. In May 2010 he was selected in a squad of over 40 players to represent Argentina during Scotland's two test Summer tour of Argentina. He previously represented Argentina in 7's rugby. He was called for the 2011 Rugby World Cup.
