= Belisario Agulla =

Argentine rugby union player (born 1988)

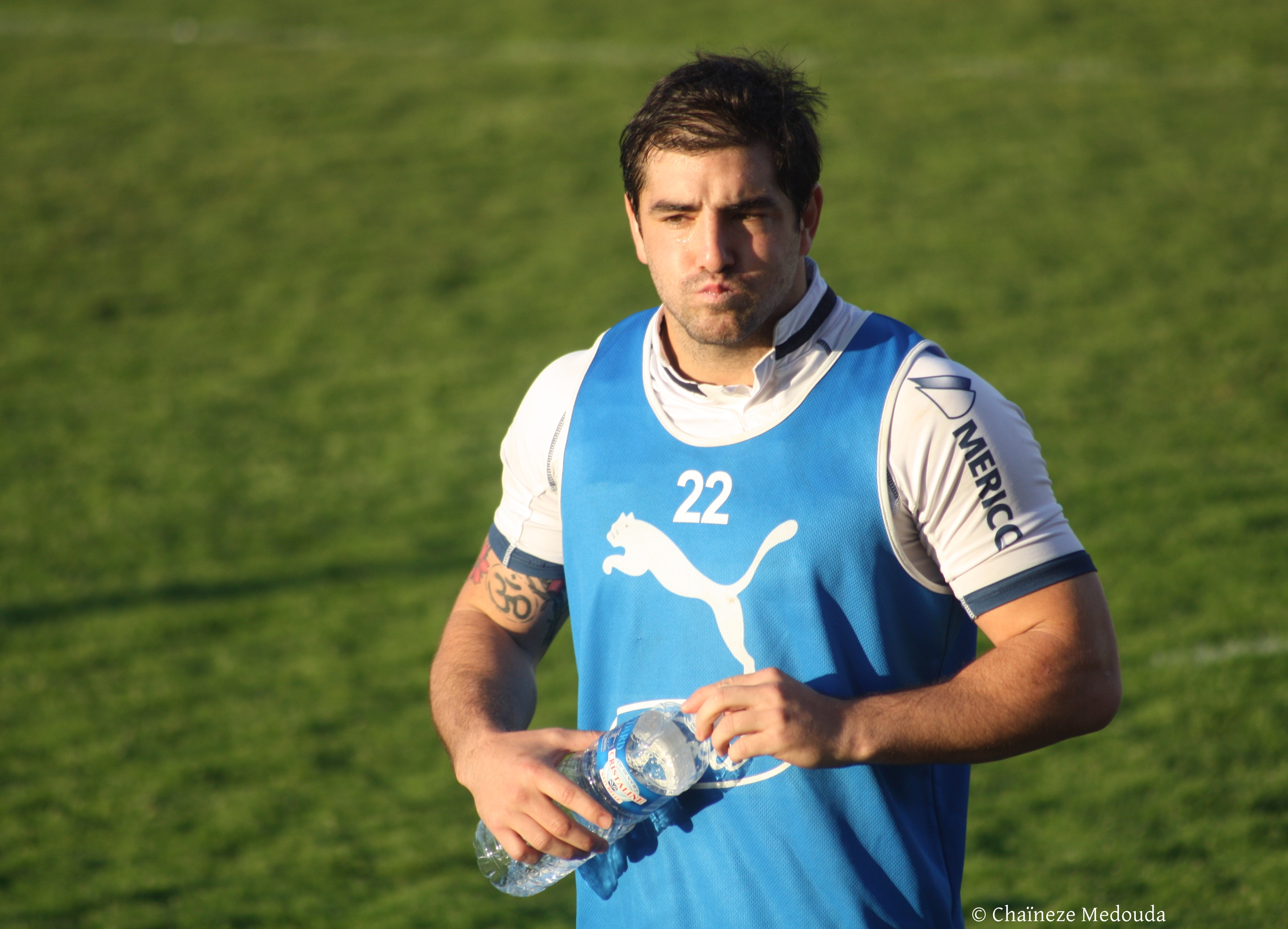
- Full name: Belisario Agulla
- Born: 23 May 1988 (age 38) Buenos Aires, Argentina
- Height: 1.75 m (5 ft 9 in)
- Weight: 87 kg (13 st 10 lb; 192 lb)

Rugby union career
- Position: Fullback / Centre / Wing
- Current team: Hindú
Senior career
Years	Team	Apps	(Points)
2010–2011	Hindú	21	(102)
2011	Pampas XV	3	(5)
2011–2015	Agen	24	(30)
2015–2018	Newcastle Falcons	19	(5)
2018–	Hindú		
- Correct as of 28 August 2022
International career
Years	Team	Apps	(Points)
2006–2007	Argentina U19	12	(25)
2008	Argentina U20	5	(5)
2007	Argentina U21	3	(7)
2009–2011	Argentina Jaguars	14	(20)
2009–	Argentina	11	(35)
- Correct as of 24 June 2013

Belisario Agulla (born Buenos Aires, 23 May 1988) is an Argentine rugby union player. He plays as a wing and as a fullback.

Agulla played for Hindú Club, in Argentina, from 2009 to 2011, winning the Nacional de Clubes in 2010. He also played at the same time for Pampas XV in South African Vodacom Cup. He moved to SU Agen, in France, where he was for 2011–12 season. On 20 October 2015, Agulla moved to England to join Newcastle Falcons on the Aviva Premiership from the 2015–16 season.

Agulla has 11 caps for Argentina, since 2009, with 7 tries scored, 35 points on aggregate. He also has played for Argentina Jaguars.
