= Bruno Postiglioni =

Argentine rugby union player (born 1987)

- Born: Bruno Postiglioni; 8 April 1987 (age 39) La Plata, Argentina
- Height: 1.85 m (6 ft 1 in)
- Weight: 110 kg (17 st 5 lb; 243 lb)

Rugby union career
- Position: Hooker / Loosehead Prop
Senior career
Years	Team	Apps	(Points)
2009–2014	La Plata	29	(25)
2011–2015	Pampas XV	28	(15)
2015−2017	Zebre	33	(5)
2017−2018	Bizkaia Gernika	12	(5)
2018−2021	Aubenas Vals	40	(15)
2021−	Beauvais Rugby Club		
- Correct as of 8 June 2014
International career
Years	Team	Apps	(Points)
2006	Argentina U.20	3	(0)
2012–2014	Argentina	18	(5)

Bruno Postiglioni (born 8 April 1987 in La Plata) is an Argentine rugby union player. He plays as a prop and as a hooker.

Postiglioni currently plays for Beauvais Rugby Club.

He counts 18 caps for Argentina, since his debut on 20 May 2012, in the 40–5 win over Uruguay, in Santiago, for the South American Rugby Championship. He has currently scored one try and 5 points on aggregate.

Postiglioni was called for the 2012 Rugby Championship, but only made his debut in the competition in 2014.
