= 2011 Eastern Province Kings season =

Team Information
- Stadium: Nelson Mandela Bay Stadium
- CEO: Anele Pamba
- Coach: Alan Solomons
- Captain/s: Mzwandile Stick; Luke Watson

Currie Cup First Division
- Rank: 2nd (losing finalists)
- Record: Won 10, lost 2
- Top points scorer: Louis Strydom (88)
- Top try scorers: Marcello Sampson (10)

Vodacom Cup (South)
- Rank: 5th
- Record: Won 6, lost 2
- Top points scorer: Jaco van Schalkwyk (54)
- Top try scorers: Siyanda Grey; Norman Nelson; Devin Oosthuizen; Barend Pieterse (4)

Other seasons
- Next season: 2012 →

In 2011, the Eastern Province Kings participated in the Currie Cup First Division and the Vodacom Cup. As part of the Southern Kings franchise, a number of players also participated in friendlies for this franchise, as well as the 2011 IRB Nations Cup.

== Chronological list of events ==
- 12 January 2011: The EP Kings 2011 squad list is published on the official site and the fixture list for the season is revealed.
- 29 January 2011: A Southern Kings team consisting entirely of Eastern Province Kings players beat the Bulls Super Rugby team 23-7 in Port Elizabeth.
- 4 February 2011: The Southern Kings lose 45-17 to the Cheetahs Super Rugby team in Port Elizabeth. Again, all the players involved are from the Eastern Province Kings.
- 11 February 2011: The Southern Kings lose 24-30 to the MTN Lions Super Rugby team in Port Elizabeth with a team containing only Eastern Province Kings players.
- 18 February 2011: The IRB announce details for the 2011 IRB Nations Cup, where several EP Kings players will represent the South African Kings team. The other participants are Romania, Namibia, Georgia, Argentina Jaguars and Portugal.
- 25 February 2011: The EP Kings win their opening Vodacom Cup game 47-12 at home to the Welwitschias. Tries from Barend Pieterse, Darron Nell, Milo Nqoro (2), Monty Dumond, Morné Hanekom and Siyanda Grey helped them get off to a winning start in the competition and saw them in second place on the Southern Section log.
- 27 February 2011: The EP Kings sign the former SWD Eagles loose forward Jacques Engelbrecht.
- 4 March 2011: The EP Kings made it two wins out of two by beating the Leopards in Potchefstroom. They won 31-25, after the scores were level on 19-19 at half-time. The try scorers were Norman Nelson, Barend Pieterse and Mpho Mbiyozo. Two conversions and three penalties by Monty Dumond and a Jaco van Schalkwyk penalty rounded off the scoring.
- 11 March 2011: The EP Kings were deducted the 9 points gained in their first two Vodacom Cup games for fielding Jacques Coetzee and Hannes Franklin, who were deemed ineligible since they had no clearance certificate following their transfers from the Pumas. A R15 000 fine was also imposed for fielding these players in two of the Southern Kings' games. The Kings have lodged an appeal against this decision, which ultimately proved unsuccessful.
  On the pitch, they beat the Pumas 23-8 with tries from Marcello Sampson and Matthew Tayler-Smith, with Jaco van Schalkwyk adding 13 points with the boot.
- 17 March 2011: The EP Kings team for the upcoming game against the Falcons was named and included former player Wayne van Heerden, who returned to the team after a spell playing for Suntory Sungoliath in the Japanese Top League.
- 18 March 2011: The Kings announce the signing of former New Zealand Maori prop Clint Newland, who joins after a short stint playing for Irish team Leinster Rugby.
- 19 March 2011: The EP Kings beat the Falcons 51-0 in Vanderbijlpark to make it 4 wins in the row in the 2011 Vodacom Cup. They went top of the table, but with a points deduction still looming, this might be a false position. The try-scorers on the day were Norman Nelson and Devin Oosthuizen with a brace each, while Darron Nell, Marcello Sampson, Siyanda Grey and Morné Hanekom each also got a try. Jaco van Schalkwyk added 4 conversions and a penalty.
- 22 March 2011: After an injury to player Gurthrö Steenkamp, the Vodacom Bulls Super Rugby franchise requested Jaco Engels join their team as backup, but this approach was rejected by the Eastern Province Kings.
- 25 March 2011: The EP Kings lose their first game of the season, going down 11–10 to the Golden Lions. They went down to ten men after 33 minutes when full-back Mzwandile Stick was red-carded. Clint Newland scored the only try for the Kings, with Jaco van Schalkwyk adding 5 points with the boot.
- 30 March 2011: Eastern Province Kings are officially the 9 deducted points they gained in their first two Vodacom Cup games for fielding ineligible players, as well as fined R15 000 for fielding these players in two Southern Kings friendly games. Their appeal against the original decision on 11 March was rejected.
- 31 March 2011: Full-back and captain Mzwandile Stick receives a three-week ban following a head-butt and subsequent sending off in the Vodacom Cup match against the Golden Lions.
- 2 April 2011: The EP Kings lose their second consecutive game, losing 29–28 to the Blue Bulls. Tries from Norman Nelson, SP Marais and Frank Herne and 13 points from the boot of Jaco van Schalkwyk weren't enough in this game. This result leaves the Kings in second last place on the log, with only an outside chance of making the quarter-finals.
- 9 April 2011: The EP Kings returned to winning ways, beating the Griquas 26–16 at Grey High School, Port Elizabeth. Two tries from Jacques Engelbrecht and one each from Wayne Stevens and Jaco Engels earned the Kings a bonus point, with conversions from SP Marais Jaco van Schalkwyk completing the scoring. Despite this result, the Kings missed out on a quarter final spot.
- 14 April 2011: EP Kings academy player Rynier Bernardo becomes the first ever player from this academy to be selected for an Under-20 Springboks training camp.
- 15 April 2011: The Kings beat the Griffons 45–43 in a 13-try thriller to finish the season in 5th place in the Vodacom Cup Southern Section, missing out on the quarter-finals. Siyanda Grey, Barend Pieterse and Devin Oosthuizen all got two tries in this game and Jacques Potgieter added a further try. Jaco van Schalkwyk scored three conversions and Monty Dumond scored a further two.
- 4 May 2011: The Kings announce the signing of 21-year-old scrum-half Danie Faasen from UP Tuks.
- 25 May 2011: The South African Kings squad that will play in the 2011 IRB Nations Cup is announced. 26 of the 27 players in the squad are Eastern Province Kings players.
- 7 June 2011: The Kings announce the signing of fly-half Louis Strydom from the Free State Cheetahs.
- 9 June 2011: Monty Dumond leaves the Kings to join Griquas.
- 10 June 2011: A South African Kings team featuring 22 Eastern Province Kings players beat Georgia 31–17 in the 2011 IRB Nations Cup.
- 10 June 2011: A South African Kings team featuring 22 Eastern Province Kings players beat Georgia 31–17 in the 2011 IRB Nations Cup.
- 15 June 2011: 21 Eastern Province Kings players star in the South African Kings team that beat Romania 27–23 in the 2011 IRB Nations Cup.
- 19 June 2011: The South African Kings win the 2011 IRB Nations Cup after winning all three their games. In the third game, they beat Portugal 39–12, once again featuring 21 Eastern Province Kings players.
- 5 July 2011: Luke Watson is named the new Eastern Province Kings captain, with Mzwandile Stick becoming vice-captain. Also, it is confirmed that Falie Oelschig joined from Stade Français and Joe Breytenbach is on trial from SWD Eagles. Both these players are included to the face Free State Cheetahs in a Currie Cup compulsory friendly.
- 8 July 2011: The Kings lost 26–20 to a young Free State Cheetahs team in their Currie Cup compulsory friendly. Mzwandile Stick scored a try and Louis Strydom scored five penalties in the defeat.
- 15 July 2011: Eastern Province Kings beat SWD Eagles 28–20 in a repeat of last season's play-off final, with Norman Nelson scoring the only try for the home team. Louis Strydom scored the conversion and four penalties and George Whitehead added a further three penalties on his debut.
- 22 July 2011: Eastern Province Kings got a decisive victory over Border Bulldogs, winning 62–15. Marcello Sampson scored a hat-trick of tries and Jaco Bekker and George Whitehead each got two. Further tries were added by Barend Pieterse, Wayne van Heerden and Hannes Franklin, while George Whitehead also kicked six conversions.
- 29 July 2011: The Kings ran riot again, beating Griffons 67–26 in Port Elizabeth. Marcello Sampson scored a hat-trick of tries for the second game in a row. Jaco Bekker again got two tries, as did Norman Nelson. SP Marais, Siyanda Grey, Falie Oelschig and Luke Watson scored the other tries, with George Whitehead kicking six conversions.
- 3 August 2011: The Blue Bulls announce that they have signed Jacques Potgieter for 2012 on a two-year contract. A new face in the Kings team to face the Falcons is Morgan Newman, a centre recently signed from the Free State Cheetahs.
- 5 August 2011: The Eastern Province Kings beat the Falcons 36–20 and moved to the top of the table for the first time this season (with previous league leaders Boland Cavaliers having a bye this weekend). SP Marais scored three tries, Matthew Tayler-Smith scored two and Norman Nelson got one try for the Kings. George Whitehead converted two and Louis Strydom converted one of these tries to round off the scoring.
- 12 August 2011: The Kings moved seven points clear at the top of the log by beating nearest rivals Boland Cavaliers 23–17 in a close-fought contest. Luke Watson and Clint Newland scored tries for the hosts, while fly-half Louis Strydom added two conversions, two penalties and a drop goal.
- 26 August 2011: Four tries from SP Marais helped the Kings to a 60–24 victory over the SWD Eagles. Norman Nelson scored two tries and further tries were scored by Matthew Tayler-Smith, Frank Herne and Luke Watson. Four conversions and a penalty from Louis Strydom, as well as two conversions from man of the match SP Marais completed the scoring. The Kings remain top of the table, two points clear of Boland Cavaliers. The Under-21 team won their game against the Eagles by 36–7, while the Under-19 team lost 34–43 to the Falcons.
- 30 August 2011: The Blue Bulls announce that they have secured the early release of Jacques Potgieter from his Kings contract and that he would join them effective 1 September.
- 2 September 2011: Yet another high-scoring game saw the Kings make it seven wins out of seven by beating local rivals Border Bulldogs 51–36 in Port Elizabeth. Captain Luke Watson scored two tries, while Marcello Sampson, Louis Strydom, Danie Faasen, Norman Nelson and Jaco Engels got one each. Three conversions from Louis Strydom and two penalties and two conversions from George Whitehead complete the scoring for the home side. The Under-21 team secured an even narrower victory, beating the Bulldogs 29–21, but the Under-19s lost 18–34.
- 10 September 2011: Eastern Province Kings stuttered to a narrow 21 – 19 victory over the Griffons despite trailing 16 – 11 at half-time. The Kings' two tries were scored by Marcello Sampson and Joe Breytenbach, with Louis Strydom kicking 11 points. The result maintains their 100% record in this competition, but the Boland Cavaliers narrowed the gap at the top of the table to just one point by getting a bonus point in their fixture. The Under-21 team won 66 – 40 against the Griffons, while the Under-19 team suffered their third consecutive defeat, going down 26 – 9.
- 14 September 2011: Kings scrum-half Jacques Coetzee was included in the contracted players list for Griquas for the 2012 season.
- 16 September 2011: The EP Kings go six point clear in the First Division (although nearest rivals Boland Cavaliers have a game in hand) by beating Falcons 40 – 10 at the Nelson Mandela Bay Stadium, Port Elizabeth. Marcello Sampson scored another two tries to take his tally for the season to ten. Further tries from Luke Watson, Ross Kennedy, Jacques Coetzee and Bobby Dyer ensured a bonus point was attained, while four conversions from Louis Strydom and one from George Whitehead rounding off the scoring. The Under-21 team won their fourth consecutive game, beating Griffons 39 – 20, but the Under-19 suffered their fourth consecutive defeat, losing 12 – 25 to the same opposition.
- 23 September 2011: A game which sees the top two teams in the division meet in Wellington sees the Boland Cavaliers run out comfortable 49 – 15 winners. Jaco Engels and Luke Watson scored the tries for the Kings, while SP Marais added five points with the boot. The Kings remain at the top of the table, one point clear of the Cavaliers, but have finished their regular season games, while the Cavaliers still have one game left to play against SWD Eagles. The Under-21 team made it five in a row, Boland Cavaliers 35 – 31 and qualifying for the title play-offs in the process. The Under-19s' woes continued, losing 27 – 50 to the Cavaliers, their fifth loss out of five.
- 30 September 2011: The Kings finish second on the log after the Boland Cavaliers beat SWD Eagles. They will play their semi-final on 7 October at home to the Falcons, after they beat the Border Bulldogs. Despite not playing, the Under-21 team secured top spot in their pool.
- 1 October 2011: The Under-21 team finish their campaign, beating the Pumas 36 – 24 to set up a home semi-final against the Pumas on 7 October. The Under-19, in contrast, made it 6 defeats out of 6 by losing 14 – 19 to the Pumas to finish bottom of their division.
- 7 October 2011: The Kings win their play-off semi-final game, beating the Falcons 48 – 17. Six tries were scored by Bobby Dyer, Jacques Engelbrecht, Norman Nelson, Devin Oosthuizen, SP Marais and Jaco Bekker, all six were converted - five by Louis Strydom and one by George Whitehead. Louis Strydom also added another two penalties to complete the scoreline. The Under-21 team won 23 – 13 against the Pumas to progress to the final, where they will meet the Border Bulldogs.
- 14 October 2011: The Kings lost the play-off final, crashing to a 43 – 12 defeat to Boland Cavaliers. Despite leading through an early try by Andile Witbooi – converted by Louis Strydom – the Cavaliers ran in six tries to easily win the game. A late try by Bobby Dyer was scant consolation on the day. The Under-21 also lost their play-off game, being edged 23 – 19 by the Border Bulldogs.
- 1 November 2011: Kings players Marlon Lewis and Milo Nqoro are named in an Emerging South Africa sevens team for the Safaricom Sevens tournament in Kenya.
- 2 November 2011: Lock Ross Kennedy leaves the Kings after being named in the Crusaders' 2011 Super Rugby squad. Also, prop Ronnie Uys is released from his contract.
- 3 November 2011: Yet another lock departs the Kings, with Rory Duncan announcing his retirement from rugby.
- 9 November 2011: Just days after lock Ross Kennedy left the Kings, it is announced that his father, Adrian Kennedy, also left the coaching staff of the Kings and returned to New Zealand.
- 12 November 2011: Former Springbok winger Jongi Nokwe joins the Kings on a one-year deal.

== Players ==
=== Vodacom Cup squad ===
The following players appeared in at least one matchday squad during the 2011 Vodacom Cup competition:

2011 Eastern Province Kings Vodacom Cup squad
Forwards	Boetie Britz • Rory Duncan • Jacques Engelbrecht • Jaco Engels • Hannes Franklin • Morné Hanekom • Frank Herne • Ross Kennedy • Mpho Mbiyozo • Darron Nell • Clint Newland • Devin Oosthuizen • Lungelo Payi • Barend Pieterse • Jacques Potgieter • André Schlechter • Ronnie Uys • Wayne van Heerden • Riaan Vermeulen
Backs	Boela Abrahams • De Wet Barry • Jaco Bekker • Jacques Coetzee • Monty Dumond • Shane Gates • Siyanda Grey • Tiger Mangweni • SP Marais • Norman Nelson • Milo Nqoro • Marcello Sampson • Wayne Stevens • Mzwandile Stick • Matthew Tayler-Smith • Jaco van Schalkwyk
Coach	Alan Solomons

=== Currie Cup squad ===
The following players appeared in at least one matchday squad during the 2011 Currie Cup First Division competition:

2011 Eastern Province Kings Currie Cup squad
Forwards	Boetie Britz • Bobby Dyer • Jacques Engelbrecht • Jaco Engels • Hannes Franklin • Frank Herne • Ross Kennedy • Mpho Mbiyozo • Darron Nell • Clint Newland • Devin Oosthuizen • Barend Pieterse • Jacques Potgieter • André Schlechter • Ronnie Uys • Wayne van Heerden • Riaan Vermeulen • Luke Watson
Backs	Boela Abrahams • Jaco Bekker • Joe Breytenbach • Jacques Coetzee • Danie Faasen • Siyanda Grey • Tiger Mangweni • SP Marais • Norman Nelson • Morgan Newman • Falie Oelschig • Marcello Sampson • Wayne Stevens • Mzwandile Stick • Louis Strydom • Matthew Tayler-Smith • George Whitehead • Andile Witbooi
Coach	Alan Solomons

=== Under-21 Provincial Championship squad ===
The following players appeared in at least one matchday squad during the 2011 Under-21 Provincial Championship competition:

2011 Eastern Province Kings Under-21 Provincial Championship squad
Forwards	Zimuisa April • Michael Aristidou • Rynier Bernardo • Thembelani Bholi • Johan Engelbrecht • Louis Fourie • Lizo Gqoboka • Werner Kapp • Elrich Kock • Heinrich Leonard • Athenkosi Manentsa • Siya Mangaliso • Chad Mathews • Lumko Mbane • Thabiso Mngomezulu • Freddie Roberts • Chris Stokwe • Cornelius van Vuuren
Backs	Masixole Banda • Luxolo Daku • Renier Erasmus • Shane Gates • Steven Hansel • Matthew King • Sinakho Khanyisa Mafu • Lulama Mdzoyi • Thabo Sisusa • Scott van Breda • Steyn van Eeden • Charl van Loggenberg • Reynier van Rooyen • Andile Witbooi

=== Under-19 Provincial Championship squad ===
The following players appeared in at least one matchday squad during the 2011 Under-19 Provincial Championship competition:

2011 Eastern Province Kings Under-19 Provincial Championship squad
Forwards	Aidon Davis • Olivier Dippenaar • Jonathan Ford • Troy Frisch • Luxolo Koza • Bart le Roux • Siwapiwe Sivuyise Mandlake • Leon Manuel • Athenkosi Maswana • Ryno Thomas Meiring • Cedric Asanda Modise • Sinethemba Ndita • Ruan Roberts • Paul Schoeman • Kuhle Sonkosi • Chriszuan Slabbert • Wayven Smith • Divan Marius van der Merwe
Backs	Lorenzo Baatjies • Robert Brundson • Devin Yusif Grootboom • Ryno Kilian • Marnus Markram • Meyer Meyer • Manelisa Mtati • Godwin Imaneul Murens • Llewellyn Lesley Pieterse • Emile Potgieter • Rosseau Prinsloo • Marlou van Niekerk • Dirk van Rooyen • Cheswin van Wyk

=== Player movements ===
Before the 2011 Vodacom Cup season
In/out	Position	Player name	From/to
In	PR	Jaco Engels	Blue Bulls
In	PR	Clint Newland	Leinster
In	PR	Ronnie Uys	Pumas
In	HK	Frank Herne	Free State Cheetahs
In	HK	Hannes Franklin	Pumas
In	LK	Ross Kennedy	Hawke's Bay Magpies
In	LK	Barend Pieterse	Free State Cheetahs
In	LK	Wayne van Heerden	Suntory Sungoliath
In	FL	Boetie Britz	Maties
In	FL	Jacques Engelbrecht	SWD Eagles
In	SH	Jacques Coetzee	Pumas
In	FH	Monty Dumond	Sharks
In	WG	Marcello Sampson	Western Province
In	FB	SP Marais	Leopards
Out	PR	Michael Rice	Pumas
Out	PR	Sangoni Mxoli	Not named in 2011 squad
Out	HK	Antonio Halangahu	Randwick DRUFC
Out	LK	Hein Potgieter	SWD Eagles
Out	LK	Brendon Snyman	Leopards
Out	LK	Willem Stoltz	Leopards
Out	FL	Pietie Ferreira	Retired
Out	FL	JJ Gagiano	UCT Ikey Tigers
Out	FL	Sivuyile Kobokana	Despatch Rugby Club
Out	FL	Elroy Ligman	Despatch Rugby Club
Out	FL	Zolani Mofu	Released
Out	SH	Gerrie Odendaal	Retired
Out	SH	Donald Stevens	Maties
Out	FH	Coenie van Wyk	Pumas
Out	CE	Braam Gerber	Boland Cavaliers
Out	CE	Rudi Keil	RC Nice
Out	WG	Justin Peach	Not named in 2011 squad.
Out	FB	Anthony Fenner	Otago
Before the 2011 Currie Cup season
In	N8	Luke Watson	Bath
In	SH	Danie Faasen	UP Tuks
In	SH	Falie Oelschig	Stade Français
In	FH	Louis Strydom	Free State Cheetahs
In	FB	George Whitehead	Free State Cheetahs
Out	LK	Lungelo Payi	Released
Out	N8	Morné Hanekom	Leopards
During the 2011 Currie Cup season
Out	N8	Jacques Potgieter	Blue Bulls
Loans and short-term deals
In	WG	Joe Breytenbach	SWD Eagles
In	CE	Morgan Newman	Free State Cheetahs
Out	FH	Monty Dumond	Griquas
Before the 2012 Vodacom Cup season
In	PR	Lizo Gqoboka	Eastern Province Kings Academy
In	PR	Thabiso Mngomezulu	Eastern Province Kings Academy
In	LK	Rynier Bernardo	Eastern Province Kings Academy
In	LK	David Bulbring	Golden Lions
In	LK	Johan Snyman	Golden Lions
In	FL	Thembelani Bholi	Eastern Province Kings Academy
In	N8	Cornell du Preez	Leopards
In	SH	Reynier van Rooyen	Eastern Province Kings Academy
In	FH	Siya Mangaliso	Eastern Province Kings Academy
In	FH	Shane Gates	Eastern Province Kings Academy
In	FH	Andile Witbooi	Eastern Province Kings Academy
In	WG	Jongi Nokwe	Griffons
Out	PR	Phumlani Nodikida	Released
Out	PR	Ronnie Uys	RC Narbonne
Out	PR	Riaan Vermeulen	Released
Out	HK	Jaco Fourie	Released
Out	LK	Nolan Clark	Boland Cavaliers
Out	LK	Rory Duncan	Retired
Out	LK	Ross Kennedy	Crusaders
Out	SH	Boela Abrahams	Released
Out	SH	Jacques Coetzee	Griquas
Out	SH	Marlon Lewis	Released
Out	FH	Jaco van Schalkwyk	Released
Out	CE	De Wet Barry	Retired
Out	WG	Milo Nqoro	Released

== Tables ==
=== Vodacom Cup ===
2011 Vodacom Cup Southern Section log
Pos	Team	Pld	W	D	L	PF	PA	PD	TF	TA	TB	LB	Pts
1	Pampas XV	8	8	0	0	319	154	+165	41	18	5	0	37
2	Western Province	8	7	1	0	312	97	+215	40	12	3	0	33
3	Sharks XV	8	6	0	2	283	137	+146	37	13	5	1	30
4	Free State Cheetahs	8	4	0	4	252	224	+28	31	27	5	1	22
5	Eastern Province Kings	8	6	0	2	261	144	+117	35	17	4	2	21 (Note: Eastern Province Kings were deducted nine points for fielding ineligible players in two games.)
6	Boland Cavaliers	8	3	1	4	249	229	+20	36	30	4	1	19
7	SWD Eagles	8	3	0	5	174	273	−99	26	36	4	1	17
8	Border Bulldogs	8	1	1	6	125	349	−224	16	51	0	1	7

=== Currie Cup ===
The final league standings for the 2011 Currie Cup First Division were:

2011 Currie Cup First Division standings
Pos	Team	Pld	W	D	L	PF	PA	PD	TF	TA	TB	LB	Pts	Qualification
1	Boland Cavaliers (C)	10	9	0	1	473	187	+286	62	24	9	1	46	Promotion playoffs Semi-finals
2	Eastern Province Kings	10	9	0	1	403	236	+167	56	28	6	0	42	Semi-finals
3	Falcons	10	4	0	6	286	398	−112	41	52	5	0	21	Semi-finals
4	Griffons	10	2	0	8	280	366	−86	34	49	6	4	18	Semi-finals
5	SWD Eagles	10	3	0	7	298	396	−98	37	49	3	1	16	
6	Border Bulldogs	10	3	0	7	256	413	−157	29	57	3	1	16	

Rules for classification: 4 points for a win; 2 points for a draw; 1 bonus point for a loss by seven points or less; 1 bonus point for scoring four or more tries in a match
The top four teams qualify to the semi-finals: The first-placed team will host the fourth-placed team and the second-placed team will host the third-placed team. The higher-ranked semi-final winner will then host the lower-ranked semi-final winner in the final
(C) Champion

== Matches ==
=== Vodacom Cup ===
25 February 2011	Eastern Province Kings	47–12	Welwitschias	Nelson Mandela Bay Stadium, Port Elizabeth
19:00	Try: Milo Nqoro 3'; Darron Nell 8'; Barend Pieterse 17'; Siyanda Grey 24', 57'; Morné Hanekom 66'; Monty Dumond 79'; Con: Matthew Tayler-Smith 4', 18' (2/3); Monty Dumond 25', 58', 67', 80' (4/4); Cards: Ross Kennedy (yellow card) 20' to 30'; Ronnie Uys (yellow card) 72'	Report; Scoreboard	Try: Heini Bock 5'; PJ van Lill 69'; Con: Jacky Bock (0/1); Chrysander Botha 70' (1/1)	Referee: Joey Salmans

4 March 2011	Leopards	25–31	Eastern Province Kings	Olën Park, Potchefstroom
18:00	Try: Jaco van Zyl 48'; Con: Dauw Steyn 49' (1/1); Pen: Dauw Steyn 1', 6', 11', 42', 51' (5/8); Colin Lloyd 77' (1/1)	Report; Scoreboard	Try: Norman Nelson 31'; Barend Pieterse 64'; Mpho Mbiyozo 73'; Con: Monty Dumond 32' (1/1); Jaco van Schalkwyk 74' (1/2); Pen: Monty Dumond 3', 8', 21', 38' (4/4); Jaco van Schalkwyk (0/1)	Referee: Rasta Rasivhenge

11 March 2011	Eastern Province Kings	23–8	Pumas	Nelson Mandela Bay Stadium, Port Elizabeth
19:00	Try: Matthew Tayler-Smith 18'; Marcello Sampson 38'; Con: Jaco van Schalkwyk 18', 38' (2/2); Pen: Jaco van Schalkwyk 35', 44' (2/4); Drop: Jaco van Schalkwyk 64' (1/1); Cards: Ronnie Uys (yellow card) 54' to 63'	Report; Scoreboard	Try: Deon Scholtz 60'; Con: Braam Pretorius (0/1); Pen: Braam Pretorius 24' (1/1)	Attendance: 2,300; Referee: Dilbert November

19 March 2011	Falcons	0–51	Eastern Province Kings	Isak Steyl Stadium, Vanderbijlpark
15:00	Pen: Dewald Nel (0/1)	Report; Scoreboard	Try: Darron Nell 3'; Marcello Sampson 9'; Norman Nelson 28', 76'; Devin Oosthuizen 37', 51'; Siyanda Grey 42'; Morne Hanekom 72'; Con: Jaco van Schalkwyk 4', 10', 29', 42' (4/6); Monty Dumond (0/2); Pen: Jaco van Schalkwyk 8' (1/1)	Attendance: 500; Referee: Jason Jaftha

25 March 2011	Eastern Province Kings	10–11	Golden Lions	Nelson Mandela Bay Stadium, Port Elizabeth
19:00	Try: Clint Newland 54'; Con: Jaco van Schalkwyk 55' (1/1); Pen: Jaco van Schalkwyk 62' (1/3); Drop: Mzwandile Stick (0/1); Cards: Mzwandile Stick (red card) 33'	Report; Scoreboard	Try: Dusty Noble 37'; Con: Burton Francis (0/1); Pen: Burton Francis 26', 65' (2/7); Cards: Marius Delport (yellow card) 33' to 43'; Martin Bezuidenhout (yellow card) 50' to 60'	Attendance: 3,500; Referee: François Groenewald

2 April 2011	Blue Bulls	29–28	Eastern Province Kings	Loftus Versfeld, Pretoria
15:00	Try: Clayton Blommetjies 3'; Sampie Mastriet 33'; Marnus Schoeman 69'; Con: Marnitz Boshoff 70' (1/3); Pen: Marnitz Boshoff 11', 18', 26', 61' (4/5); Drop: Marnitz Boshoff (0/1); Cards: Marnus Schoeman (yellow card) 73'	Report; Scoreboard	Try: Norman Nelson 16'; SP Marais 22'; Frank Herne 76'; Con: Jaco van Schalkwyk 17', 77' (2/3); Pen: Jaco van Schalkwyk 40', 54', 58' (3/3)	Attendance: 2,000; Referee: Francisco Pastrana

9 April 2011	Eastern Province Kings	26–16	Griquas	Grey High School, Port Elizabeth
16:00	Try: Wayne Stevens 4'; Jacques Engelbrecht 50', 58'; Jaco Engels 73'; Con: Jaco van Schalkwyk 5' (1/2); SP Marais 51', 59' (2/2); Pen: Jaco van Schalkwyk (0/3); SP Marais (0/1); Cards: Ross Kennedy (yellow card) 1' to 12'	Report; Scoreboard	Try: Johan Herbst 24', 40'; Con: Rudi Vogt (0/2); Pen: Rudi Vogt 6', 12' (2/3)	Referee: Matt Kemp

15 April 2011	Griffons	43–45	Eastern Province Kings	North West Stadium, Welkom
16:00	Try: Thabang Molefe 24', 69'; Ricardo Pietersen 47'; Japie Nel 68'; Kevin Stevens 72'; Shane Hancke 77'; Con: Tiaan van Wyk 25', 48' (2/2); Virgil Russel 69' (1/1); Tertius Maarman 73', 78' (2/3); Pen: Tiaan van Wyk 16' (1/2); Cards: Shane Hancke (yellow card) 19' to 29'	Report; Scoreboard	Try: Siyanda Grey 9', 74'; Devin Oosthuizen 20', 49'; Barend Pieterse 28', 53'; Jacques Potgieter 65'; Con: Jaco van Schalkwyk 10', 21', 29' (3/4); Monty Dumond 66', 75' (2/3)	Referee: Lusanda Jam

=== Currie Cup ===
Compulsory Friendly	8 July 2011	Eastern Province Kings	20–26	Emerging Cheetahs	Nelson Mandela Bay Stadium, Port Elizabeth
	19:00	Try: Mzwandile Stick 48'; Con: Louis Strydom (0/1); Pen: Louis Strydom 18', 21', 23', 32', 58' (5/6)	Scoreboard	Try: Rayno Benjamin 62'; Riaan Smit 70'; Con: Riaan Smit 63', 71' (2/2); Pen: Riaan Smit 10', 30', 44' (3/3); Johan Goosen (0/1); Robbie van Schalkwyk 79' (1/1)	Attendance: 5,000; Referee: Pro Legoete

15 July 2011	Eastern Province Kings	28–20	SWD Eagles	Nelson Mandela Bay Stadium, Port Elizabeth
19:00	Try: Norman Nelson 7'; Con: Louis Strydom 8' (1/1); Pen: Louis Strydom 28', 35', 38', 48' (4/5); George Whitehead 62', 69', 77' (3/4)	Report; Scoreboard	Try: Howard Noble 15'; Con: Cecil Dumond (0/1); Pen: Cecil Dumond 4', 10', 41' (3/4); Elric van Vuuren 57', 74' (2/2)	Attendance: 1,500; Referee: Mark Lawrence

22 July 2011	Border Bulldogs	15–62	Eastern Province Kings	Buffalo City Stadium, East London
19:00	Try: Byron McGuigan 35', 78'; Con: Dale Sabbagh 36' (1/2); Pen: Dale Sabbagh 6' (1/1); Cards: Samora Fihlani (yellow card) 53' to 63'	Report; Scoreboard	Try: Jaco Bekker 4'; Norman Nelson 12'; Barend Pieterse 17'; Siyanda Grey 20'; Marcello Sampson 22', 61'; George Whitehead 43'; Darron Nell 46'; Frank Herne 54'; SP Marais 74'; Con: George Whitehead 5', 13', 23', 47', 55', 75' (6/10); Pen: George Whitehead (0/1)	Attendance: 2,800; Referee: Sandile Mayende

29 July 2011	Eastern Province Kings	67–26	Griffons	Nelson Mandela Bay Stadium, Port Elizabeth
19:00	Try: SP Marais 6'; Jaco Bekker 10', 16'; Marcello Sampson 22', 28', 66'; Falie Oelschig 32'; Norman Nelson 41', 73'; Luke Watson 52'; Siyanda Grey 62'; Con: George Whitehead 11', 17', 29', 42', 67', 74' (6/11)	Report; Scoreboard	Try: Ricardo Pietersen 38'; Nicky Steyn 46'; Enrico Schultz 55'; Tertius Maarman 77'; Con: Jannie Myburgh 39' (1/2); Tiaan van Wyk 56', 78' (2/2); Pen: Jannie Myburgh (0/1)	Attendance: 3,400; Referee: Pro Legoete

5 August 2011	Falcons	20–36	Eastern Province Kings	Barnard Stadium, Kempton Park
15:00	Try: Coert Cronjé 49'; Kyle Hendricks 52', 76'; Con: Dillon Laubscher 53' (1/2); Chanley Williams (0/1); Pen: Dillon Laubscher 9' (1/1)	Report; Scoreboard	Try: SP Marais 12', 23', 46'; Norman Nelson 31'; Matthew Tayler-Smith 55', 80'; Con: George Whitehead 13', 47' (2/4); Louis Strydom 80' (1/2)	Attendance: 500; Referee: Andrew Lees

12 August 2011	Eastern Province Kings	23–17	Boland Cavaliers	Nelson Mandela Bay Stadium, Port Elizabeth
19:00	Try: Luke Watson 5'; Clint Newland 32'; Con: Louis Strydom 6', 33' (2/2); Pen: Louis Strydom 12', 19' (2/4); Drop: Louis Strydom 67' (1/1)	Report; Scoreboard	Try: Cornal Hendricks 2'; Con: Elgar Watts (0/1); Pen: Elgar Watts 27', 36', 59', 69' (4/4)	Attendance: 4,000; Referee: Quinton Immelman

26 August 2011	SWD Eagles	24–60	Eastern Province Kings	Outeniqua Park, George
17:05	Try: Elric van Vuuren 14'; Howard Noble 47'; Connie Botha 60'; Con: Elric van Vuuren 15', 48', 61' (3/3); Pen: Elric van Vuuren 9' (1/2)	Report; Scoreboard	Try: SP Marais 25', 40', 45', 72'; Matthew Tayler-Smith 36'; Norman Nelson 42', 63'; Frank Herne 67'; Luke Watson 80'; Con: Louis Strydom 26', 37', 43', 46' (4/6); SP Marais 68', 73' (2/3); Pen: Louis Strydom 7' (1/2)	Attendance: 500; Referee: Marius Jonker

2 September 2011	Eastern Province Kings	51–36	Border Bulldogs	Nelson Mandela Bay Stadium, Port Elizabeth
19:00	Try: Luke Watson 22', 32'; Marcello Sampson 36'; Louis Strydom 39'; Danie Faasen 43'; Norman Nelson 71'; Jaco Engels 74'; Con: Louis Strydom 23', 37', 40' (3/5); George Whitehead 72', 75' (2/2); Pen: George Whitehead 64', 68' (2/2)	Report; Scoreboard	Try: Vuyo Mbotho 12', 26'; Lubabalo Mzwakali 56', 78'; Chumani Booi 60'; Con: Ntabeni Dukisa 27' (1/2); Dale Sabbagh 57', 61', 79' (3/3); Pen: Ntabeni Dukisa (0/1); Dale Sabbagh 47' (1/1); Cards: Onke Dubase (yellow card) 31' to 41'	Attendance: 1,200; Referee: Jaco Peyper

10 September 2011	Griffons	19–21	Eastern Province Kings	North West Stadium, Welkom
15:00	Try: Willie Britz 34'; Con: Tiaan van Wyk 35' (1/1); Pen: Tiaan van Wyk 9', 14', 20' (3/6); Drop: Tiaan van Wyk 42' (1/1); Cards: Japie Nel (yellow card) 71'	Report; Scoreboard	Try: Marcello Sampson 3'; Joe Breytenbach 73'; Con: Louis Strydom 74' (1/2); Pen: Louis Strydom 22', 27', 61' (3/5)	Attendance: 1,500; Referee: Pro Legoete

16 September 2011	Eastern Province Kings	40–10	Falcons	Nelson Mandela Bay Stadium, Port Elizabeth
19:00	Try: Luke Watson 10'; Ross Kennedy 20'; Jacques Coetzee 33'; Marcello Sampson 43', 53'; Bobby Dyer 76'; Con: Louis Strydom 11', 21', 34', 54' (4/5); George Whitehead 76' (1/1)	Report; Scoreboard	Try: Bovril de Bruin 46'; Con: Jaun Kotzé 46' (1/1); Pen: Jaun Kotzé 16' (1/1); Cards: Zane Kilian (yellow card) 30' to 41'	Referee: Joey Salmans

23 September 2011	Boland Cavaliers	49–15	Eastern Province Kings	Boland Stadium, Wellington
15:00	Try: Danwel Demas 39', 63', 71', 77'; Bolla Conradie 68'; Willie le Roux 75'; Con: Elgar Watts 40' (1/2); Willie le Roux 69', 72', 76', 78' (4/4); Pen: Elgar Watts 9', 22', 47' (3/6); Drop: Bolla Conradie (0/1); Cards: Clemen Lewis (yellow card) 48' to 58'	Report; Scoreboard	Try: Jaco Engels 12'; Luke Watson 49'; Con: SP Marais 13' (1/1); Louis Strydom (0/1); Pen: SP Marais 20' (1/2); Louis Strydom (0/1); Cards: Clint Newland (yellow card) 35' to 45'; Devin Oosthuizen (yellow card) 46' to 58'; Jacques Engelbrecht (yellow card) 66' to 76'	Attendance: 2,000; Referee: Marius Jonker

Semi-Final	7 October 2011	Eastern Province Kings	48–17	Falcons	Nelson Mandela Bay Stadium, Port Elizabeth
	18:30	Try: Bobby Dyer 13'; Jacques Engelbrecht 24'; Norman Nelson 29'; Devin Oosthuizen 46'; SP Marais 53'; Jaco Bekker 75'; Con: Louis Strydom 14', 25', 30', 47', 54' (5/5); George Whitehead 76' (1/1); Pen: Louis Strydom 23', 38' (2/2); Cards: Joe Breytenbach (yellow card) 65' to 76'	Report; Scoreboard	Try: Coert Cronjé 68'; Kyle Hendricks 79'; Con: Jaun Kotzé 69', 80' (2/2); Pen: Jaun Kotzé 21' (1/1); Cards: Heinrich Rademeyer (yellow card) 56' to 66'; Warren Perkins (yellow card) 61' to 71'	Attendance: 2,400; Referee: Pro Legoete

Final	14 October 2011	Boland Cavaliers	43–12	Eastern Province Kings	Boland Stadium, Wellington
	16:00	Try: Clemen Lewis 38'; Ligtoring Landman 48'; Brendon April 57'; Danwel Demas 73', 75'; Zandré Jordaan 77'; Con: Elgar Watts 39', 49' (2/5); Willie le Roux (0/1); Pen: Elgar Watts 4', 30', 47' (3/4); Cards: Zandré Jordaan (yellow card) 20' to 30'	Report; Scoreboard	Try: Andile Witbooi 9'; Bobby Dyer 81'; Con: Louis Strydom 10' (1/1); George Whitehead (0/1); Pen: Louis Strydom (0/1); Cards: Jaco Bekker (yellow card) 39' to 49'; Bobby Dyer (yellow card) 57' to 67'	Attendance: 5,000; Referee: Lourens van der Merwe

== Player statistics ==
=== Vodacom Cup ===
==== Appearances ====
Vodacom Cup appearances, sorted by number of starts, then substitute appearances.

Rank	Player	Starts	Sub app	Unused sub
1	Siyanda Grey	8	0	0
1	Ross Kennedy	8	0	0
3	Jaco Engels	7	0	0
4	Hannes Franklin	6	2	0
4	Jaco van Schalkwyk	6	2	0
6	Norman Nelson	6	0	0
6	Devin Oosthuizen	6	0	0
6	Barend Pieterse	6	0	0
6	Marcello Sampson	6	0	0
10	Jacques Coetzee	5	2	1
10	Mpho Mbiyozo	5	2	0
12	André Schlechter	4	4	0
13	Matthew Tayler-Smith	4	1	0
14	Boetie Britz	4	0	1
14	SP Marais	4	0	0
14	Wayne Stevens	4	0	0
14	Mzwandile Stick	4	0	0
18	Boela Abrahams	3	5	0
19	Morné Hanekom	3	2	0
20	Darron Nell	3	1	0
20	Clint Newland	3	1	0
22	Jacques Engelbrecht	3	0	0
23	Frank Herne	2	5	1
24	Jaco Bekker	2	4	0
25	Lungelo Payi	2	3	0
26	Ronnie Uys	2	2	0
27	Monty Dumond	1	5	0
28	Milo Nqoro	1	2	1
29	De Wet Barry	1	0	0
29	Tiger Mangweni	1	0	0
31	Wayne van Heerden	0	4	0
32	Jacques Potgieter	0	2	0
33	Rory Duncan	0	1	0
33	Riaan Vermeulen	0	1	0
35	Shane Gates	0	0	1

==== Cards ====
Vodacom Cup cards, sorted by red cards, then yellow cards.

Rank	Player	Red	Yellow
1	Mzwandile Stick	1	0
2	Ronnie Uys	0	2
2	Ross Kennedy	0	2

==== Points scorers ====
Vodacom Cup points scorers, sorted by number of points.

Rank	Player	Tries	Pens	Drop Goals	Cons	Points
1	Jaco van Schalkwyk	0	7	1	15	54
2	Monty Dumond	1	4	0	7	31
3	Siyanda Grey	4	0	0	0	20
3	Norman Nelson	4	0	0	0	20
3	Devin Oosthuizen	4	0	0	0	20
3	Barend Pieterse	4	0	0	0	20
7	Jacques Engelbrecht	2	0	0	0	10
7	Morné Hanekom	2	0	0	0	10
7	Darron Nell	2	0	0	0	10
7	Milo Nqoro	2	0	0	0	10
7	Marcello Sampson	2	0	0	0	10
12	Matthew Tayler-Smith	1	0	0	2	9
13	Jaco Engels	1	0	0	0	5
13	Frank Herne	1	0	0	0	5
13	Ross Kennedy	1	0	0	0	5
13	Mpho Mbiyozo	1	0	0	0	5
13	Clint Newland	1	0	0	0	5
13	Jacques Potgieter	1	0	0	0	5
13	Wayne Stevens	1	0	0	0	5
19	SP Marais	0	0	0	1	2

==== Try scorers ====
Vodacom Cup try scorers, sorted by number of tries.

Rank	Player	Tries
1	Siyanda Grey	4
1	Norman Nelson	4
1	Devin Oosthuizen	4
1	Barend Pieterse	4
5	Jacques Engelbrecht	2
5	Morné Hanekom	2
5	Darron Nell	2
5	Milo Nqoro	2
5	Marcello Sampson	2
10	Monty Dumond	1
10	Jaco Engels	1
10	Frank Herne	1
10	Ross Kennedy	1
10	Mpho Mbiyozo	1
10	Clint Newland	1
10	Jacques Potgieter	1
10	Wayne Stevens	1
10	Matthew Tayler-Smith	1

=== Currie Cup ===
==== Appearances ====
Currie Cup appearances, sorted by number of starts, then substitute appearances.

Rank	Player	Starts	Sub app	Unused sub
1	Jaco Bekker	11	1	0
2	Ross Kennedy	11	0	0
2	SP Marais	11	0	0
2	Clint Newland	11	0	0
5	Jaco Engels	10	1	0
6	Hannes Franklin	10	0	0
6	Norman Nelson	10	0	0
8	Louis Strydom	9	2	1
9	Devin Oosthuizen	9	0	0
9	Luke Watson	9	0	0
11	Barend Pieterse	8	2	0
12	Jacques Engelbrecht	8	1	0
13	Falie Oelschig	7	1	0
13	Matthew Tayler-Smith	7	1	1
15	Joe Breytenbach	7	0	0
15	Marcello Sampson	7	0	0
17	Wayne van Heerden	5	5	2
18	Darron Nell	5	2	1
19	George Whitehead	3	9	0
20	Danie Faasen	3	8	1
20	Ronnie Uys	3	8	0
22	Boetie Britz	3	1	0
23	Siyanda Grey	3	0	0
24	Jacques Coetzee	2	1	0
25	Andile Witbooi	2	0	0
26	Frank Herne	1	7	0
27	Bobby Dyer	1	6	0
27	Mpho Mbiyozo	1	6	1
29	Jacques Potgieter	1	2	0
30	Wayne Stevens	1	0	0
30	Mzwandile Stick	1	0	0
32	Tiger Mangweni	0	5	3
33	André Schlechter	0	2	0
34	Boela Abrahams	0	1	0
34	Riaan Vermeulen	0	1	0
36	Morgan Newman	0	0	1

==== Cards ====
Currie Cup cards, sorted by red cards, then yellow cards.

Rank	Player	Red	Yellow
1	Jaco Bekker	0	1
1	Joe Breytenbach	0	1
1	Bobby Dyer	0	1
1	Jacques Engelbrecht	0	1
1	Clint Newland	0	1
1	Devin Oosthuizen	0	1

==== Points scorers ====
Currie Cup points scorers, sorted by number of points.

Rank	Player	Tries	Pens	Drop Goals	Cons	Points
1	Louis Strydom	1	12	1	22	88
2	George Whitehead	2	5	0	18	61
3	SP Marais	9	1	0	3	54
4	Marcello Sampson	10	0	0	0	50
5	Norman Nelson	7	0	0	0	40
6	Luke Watson	7	0	0	0	35
7	Jaco Bekker	4	0	0	0	25
8	Bobby Dyer	3	0	0	0	15
8	Matthew Tayler-Smith	3	0	0	0	15
10	Jaco Engels	2	0	0	0	10
11	Joe Breytenbach	1	0	0	0	5
11	Jacques Coetzee	1	0	0	0	5
11	Jacques Engelbrecht	1	0	0	0	5
11	Danie Faasen	1	0	0	0	5
11	Hannes Franklin	1	0	0	0	5
11	Siyanda Grey	1	0	0	0	5
11	Frank Herne	1	0	0	0	5
11	Ross Kennedy	1	0	0	0	5
11	Clint Newland	1	0	0	0	5
11	Falie Oelschig	1	0	0	0	5
11	Devin Oosthuizen	1	0	0	0	5
11	Barend Pieterse	1	0	0	0	5
11	Wayne van Heerden	1	0	0	0	5
11	Andile Witbooi	1	0	0	0	5

==== Try scorers ====
Currie Cup try scorers, sorted by number of tries.

Rank	Player	Tries
1	Marcello Sampson	10
2	SP Marais	9
3	Norman Nelson	8
4	Luke Watson	7
5	Jaco Bekker	5
6	Bobby Dyer	2
6	Matthew Tayler-Smith	3
8	Jaco Engels	2
8	George Whitehead	2
10	Joe Breytenbach	1
10	Jacques Coetzee	1
10	Jacques Engelbrecht	1
10	Danie Faasen	1
10	Hannes Franklin	1
10	Siyanda Grey	1
10	Frank Herne	1
10	Ross Kennedy	1
10	Clint Newland	1
10	Falie Oelschig	1
10	Devin Oosthuizen	1
10	Barend Pieterse	1
10	Louis Strydom	1
10	Wayne van Heerden	1
10	Andile Witbooi	1

== See also ==
- Eastern Province Elephants
- Southern Kings
- 2011 Vodacom Cup
- 2011 Currie Cup First Division
- 2011 Under-21 Provincial Championship
- 2011 Under-19 Provincial Championship
