= 2013 Southern Kings season =

Southern Kings
- 2013 season
- Head coach: Matt Sexton
- Director of Rugby: Alan Solomons
- President: Cheeky Watson
- Captain: Luke Watson
- Stadium: Nelson Mandela Bay Stadium
- Overall: 15th
- South Africa: 5th
- Play-offs: 2nd (Won 1, Lost 1) (Lost Super Rugby status)
- Record: Won 3, Drew 1, Lost 12
- Top try scorer: All: Wimpie van der Walt (6)
- Top points scorer: All: Demetri Catrakilis (151)
Home colours	Away colours

The Southern Kings participated in their first ever Super Rugby competition in 2013. They won three, drew one and lost twelve of their matches during the regular season to finish fifth and last in the South African Conference and fifteenth and last on the overall log. Their top try scorer in the competition was Wimpie van der Walt, who got six tries, and their top points scorer was Demetri Catrakilis, who scored 142 points. As a result of finishing bottom of the South African Conference, they had to play a two-legged promotion/relegation play-off series against the Lions. The Lions beat them 44–42 on aggregate to return to Super Rugby in 2014 at the expense of the Kings.

It was also their final season in Super Rugby until 2016, when they returned after the Super Rugby competition was expanded to 18 teams.

== Chronological list of events ==
- 24 November 2012: A 51-man Southern Kings wider training squad is announced prior to the 2013 Super Rugby season.
- 27 November 2012: Despite not being named in the initial training group, Director of Rugby Alan Solomons confirms that Kenyan loose-forward Daniel Adongo will also join up with the team.
- 17 December 2012: The Kings sign French hooker Virgile Lacombe.
- 3 January 2013: After failing to pass a fitness test following a shoulder injury, Burton Francis was released by the Kings' wider training squad and returned to SWD Eagles.
- 7 January 2013: The wider training squad is cut to a core training squad of 40 players, with 13 players moving to the Vodacom Cup squad instead.
- 14 January 2013: Boetie Britz is recalled to the Southern Kings training squad following a knee injury to Hannes Franklin.
- 22 January 2013: The Kings beat Varsity Cup side NMMU Madibaz 28–12 in a warm-up game.
- 1 February 2013: The Kings beat a Franchise XV – effectively the SWD Eagles – 29–13 in a warm-up game.
- 6 February 2013: The kit for the Super Rugby season is officially launched.
- 9 February 2013: The Kings lose 31–41 to the Lions in a 2013 Lions Challenge Series match.
- 12 February 2013: The Southern Kings core training squad is further reduced to 35 players, with seven players – Boetie Britz, Wesley Dunlop, Ross Geldenhuys, Lizo Gqoboka, Scott Mathie, Siviwe Soyizwapi and Wayne Stevens – moving to the Vodacom Cup squad instead, while SWD Eagles prop Grant Kemp is a new inclusion in the squad.
- 21 March 2013: Despite being initially named in the Southern Kings squad to tour Australasia for games against Crusaders, Hurricanes, Brumbies and Rebels, Virgile Lacombe and Tomás Leonardi are recalled after the Kings fielded more than the allowed two foreigner players in their match against the Chiefs.
- 31 March 2013: Hadleigh Parkes suffered a broken arm in the match against the Hurricanes and Siviwe Soyizwapi is called into the touring squad as his replacement.
- 7 June 2013: Two Kings players join French teams for the 2013–14 season; prop Kevin Buys joins Top 14 side CA Brive and fly-half Wesley Dunlop joins Fédérale 1 side US Montauban.
- 2 July 2013: Kings players Virgile Lacombe and Tomás Leonardi both leave the club after the contracts expire.

== Personnel ==
=== Squad ===
The following players were named in the Kings squad for the 2013 Super Rugby season:

2013 Kings squad
Player	Union	Position/s	Date of birth (age)	Super Rugby		Kings	
Player	Union	Position/s	Date of birth (age)	Apps	Pts	Apps	Pts
(Kenya) Daniel Adongo	Eastern Province Kings	Lock / loose forward	12 October 1989 (aged 23)	–	–	–	–
(South Africa) Rynier Bernardo	Eastern Province Kings	Lock	27 August 1991 (aged 21)	–	–	–	–
(South Africa) David Bulbring	Eastern Province Kings	Lock	12 September 1989 (aged 23)	3	0	–	–
(South Africa) Kevin Buys	Eastern Province Kings	Prop	26 April 1986 (aged 26)	13	0	–	–
(South Africa) Demetri Catrakilis	Eastern Province Kings	Fly-half	6 September 1989 (aged 23)	–	–	–	–
(South Africa) Ronnie Cooke	Eastern Province Kings	Centre / wing	5 January 1985 (aged 28)	24	25	–	–
(South Africa) Aidon Davis	Eastern Province Kings	Loose forward	29 April 1994 (aged 18)	–	–	–	–
(South Africa) Charl du Plessis	Eastern Province Kings	Prop	8 April 1987 (aged 25)	–	–	–	–
(South Africa) Cornell du Preez	Eastern Province Kings	Loose forward	23 March 1991 (aged 21)	–	–	–	–
(South Africa) Wesley Dunlop	Eastern Province Kings	Fly-half	12 May 1987 (aged 25)	–	–	–	–
(South Africa) Jacques Engelbrecht	Eastern Province Kings	Loose forward	10 June 1985 (aged 27)	–	–	–	–
(South Africa) Jaco Engels	Eastern Province Kings	Prop	17 December 1980 (aged 32)	40	10	–	–
(South Africa) Schalk Ferreira	Eastern Province Kings	Prop	9 February 1984 (aged 29)	16	0	–	–
(South Africa) Hannes Franklin	Eastern Province Kings	Hooker	6 October 1981 (aged 31)	12	10	–	–
(South Africa) Shane Gates	Eastern Province Kings	Centre	27 September 1993 (aged 19)	–	–	–	–
(South Africa) Siyanda Grey	Eastern Province Kings	Wing	16 August 1989 (aged 23)	–	–	–	–
(South Africa) Johan Herbst	SWD Eagles	Scrum-half	18 May 1987 (aged 25)	–	–	–	–
(South Africa) Grant Kemp	SWD Eagles	Prop	31 October 1988 (aged 24)	–	–	–	–
(South Africa) Michael Killian	Eastern Province Kings	Wing	22 November 1983 (aged 29)	37	50	–	–
(France) Virgile Lacombe	Eastern Province Kings	Hooker	7 July 1984 (aged 28)	–	–	–	–
(Argentina) Tomás Leonardi	Eastern Province Kings	Loose forward	1 July 1987 (aged 25)	–	–	–	–
(South Africa) Bandise Maku	Eastern Province Kings	Hooker	24 June 1986 (aged 26)	33	0	–	–
(South Africa) Thabo Mamojele	Eastern Province Kings	Lock / loose forward	29 July 1986 (aged 26)	–	–	–	–
(South Africa) SP Marais	Eastern Province Kings	Fullback	16 March 1989 (aged 23)	–	–	–	–
(South Africa) Edgar Marutlulle	Leopards	Hooker	20 December 1987 (aged 25)	8	0	–	–
(South Africa) Mpho Mbiyozo	Eastern Province Kings	Loose forward	7 February 1983 (aged 30)	–	–	–	–
(South Africa) Waylon Murray	Eastern Province Kings	Centre	27 April 1986 (aged 26)	55	40	–	–
(South Africa) Darron Nell	Eastern Province Kings	Lock	8 March 1980 (aged 32)	10	10	–	–
(South Africa) Devin Oosthuizen	Eastern Province Kings	Loose forward	28 May 1988 (aged 24)	–	–	–	–
(New Zealand) Hadleigh Parkes	Eastern Province Kings	Centre / wing	5 October 1987 (aged 25)	13	10	–	–
(South Africa) Sergeal Petersen	Eastern Province Kings	Wing	1 August 1994 (aged 18)	–	–	–	–
(South Africa) Marcello Sampson	Eastern Province Kings	Wing	27 March 1987 (aged 25)	–	–	–	–
(South Africa) Siviwe Soyizwapi	Eastern Province Kings	Fullback / wing	7 December 1992 (aged 20)	–	–	–	–
(South Africa) Andries Strauss	Eastern Province Kings	Centre	5 March 1984 (aged 28)	40	20	–	–
(South Africa) Steven Sykes	Eastern Province Kings	Lock	5 August 1984 (aged 28)	69	45	–	–
(South Africa) Scott van Breda	Eastern Province Kings	Fullback / wing	12 December 1991 (aged 21)	–	–	–	–
(South Africa) Wimpie van der Walt	Eastern Province Kings	Loose forward	6 January 1989 (aged 24)	–	–	–	–
(South Africa) Elric van Vuuren	SWD Eagles	Fullback	8 April 1985 (aged 27)	–	–	–	–
(South Africa) Shaun Venter	Pumas	Scrum-half	16 March 1987 (aged 25)	–	–	–	–
(Argentina) Nicolás Vergallo	Eastern Province Kings	Scrum-half	20 April 1983 (aged 29)	–	–	–	–
(South Africa) Luke Watson	Eastern Province Kings	Loose forward	26 October 1983 (aged 29)	82	55	–	–
(South Africa) George Whitehead	Eastern Province Kings	Fly-half / fullback	17 March 1989 (aged 23)	–	–	–	–
Note: Players' ages and statistics are correct as of 23 February 2013, the date of the opening round of the competition.

=== Coaches and management ===
The Kings coaching and management staff for the 2013 Super Rugby season were:

2013 Kings coaches and management
Position	Name
Director of Rugby	Alan Solomons
Head coach	Matt Sexton
Defence and breakdown coach	Omar Mouneimne
Backs and attack coach	Brad Mooar
Performance analyst	Southy Steenkamp
Strength and conditioning coach	Johan Pretorius
Physiotherapist	James Fleming
Doctor	Dr Conrad van Hagen
Masseur	Lelani van der Merwe
Assistant physiotherapist	Kim Naidoo
Manager	Willem Oliphant
Logistics manager	Sydney Goba

== Season ==
=== Log ===
The final log standings in the 2013 Super Rugby season were:

Overall standings
Pos	Team	P	W	D	L	Bye	PF	PA	PD	TF	TA	TB	LB	Pts
1	(New Zealand) Chiefs	16	12	0	4	2	458	364	+94	50	38	8	2	66
2	(South Africa) Bulls	16	12	0	4	2	448	330	+118	41	34	5	2	63
3	(Australia) Brumbies	16	10	2	4	2	430	295	+135	43	31	5	3	60
4	(New Zealand) Crusaders	16	11	0	5	2	446	307	+139	44	31	5	3	60
5	(Australia) Reds	16	10	2	4	2	321	296	+25	31	23	4	2	58
6	(South Africa) Cheetahs	16	10	0	6	2	382	358	+24	38	32	2	4	54
7	(South Africa) Stormers	16	9	0	7	2	346	292	+54	30	18	1	5	50
8	(South Africa) Sharks	16	8	0	8	2	384	305	+79	40	31	3	5	48
9	(Australia) Waratahs	16	8	0	8	2	411	371	+40	45	34	1	4	45
10	(New Zealand) Blues	16	6	0	10	2	347	364	−17	40	36	6	6	44
11	(New Zealand) Hurricanes	16	6	0	10	2	386	457	−71	41	49	4	5	41
12	(Australia) Rebels	16	5	0	11	2	382	515	−133	44	65	4	5	37
13	(Australia) Force	16	4	1	11	2	267	366	−99	26	34	0	5	31
14	(New Zealand) Highlanders	16	3	0	13	2	374	496	−122	40	55	4	5	29
15	(South Africa) Southern Kings	16	3	1	12	2	298	564	−266	27	69	2	0	24
(South Africa) South African Conference
Pos	Team	P	W	D	L	Bye	PF	PA	PD	TF	TA	TB	LB	Pts
1	Bulls	16	12	0	4	2	448	330	+118	41	34	5	2	63
2	Cheetahs	16	10	0	6	2	382	358	+24	38	32	2	4	54
3	Stormers	16	9	0	7	2	346	292	+54	30	18	1	5	50
4	Sharks	16	8	0	8	2	384	305	+79	40	31	3	5	48
5	Southern Kings	16	3	1	12	2	298	564	−266	27	69	2	0	24
Final standings.

The final log standings in the 2013 Super Rugby promotion/relegation play-off were:

Standings
Pos	Team	P	W	D	L	PF	PA	PD	TF	TA	TB	LB	Pts
1	Lions	2	1	0	1	44	42	+2	4	4	0	1	5
2	Southern Kings	2	1	0	1	42	44	−2	4	4	0	1	5
Final standings.

=== Round-by-round ===
The Kings' round-by-round progression throughout the season was:

Team Progression – 2013 Super Rugby season
Team	R1	R2	R3	R4	R5	R6	R7	R8	R9	R10	R11	R12	R13	R14	R15	R16	R17	R18	R19	R20
Southern Kings	—N/a	4 (3rd)	8 (7th)	8 (7th)	8 (14th)	8 (14th)	8 (14th)	11 (14th)	15 (13th)	15 (14th)	15 (14th)	15 (14th)	20 (13th)	24 (13th)	24 (13th)	24 (14th)	24 (14th)	24 (14th)	24 (15th)	24 (15th)
For each round, their cumulative points total is shown with the overall log position in brackets.
Key:	win	draw	loss	bye	no game															

=== Matches ===
The results of the Kings' matches during the season were:

23 February 2013	Southern Kings	22–10	Force	Nelson Mandela Bay Stadium, Port Elizabeth
19:10	Try: Sergeal Petersen 15', 59'; Con: Demetri Catrakilis (0/2); Pen: Demetri Catrakilis 45', 53', 66', 70' (4/5)	Report; Scoreboard	Try: Pekahou Cowan 25'; Alfie Mafi 29'; Con: Kyle Godwin (0/1); Sam Christie (0/1); Pen: Kyle Godwin (0/1); Cards: Hugh McMeniman (yellow card) 54' to 64'	Attendance: 31,882; Referee: Lourens van der Merwe

9 March 2013	Southern Kings	12–21	Sharks	Nelson Mandela Bay Stadium, Port Elizabeth
19:10	Pen: Demetri Catrakilis 31', 57', 63', 71' (4/4)	Report; Scoreboard	Pen: Patrick Lambie 6', 14', 25', 54', 61', 80' (6/6); Drop: Patrick Lambie 40' (1/1)	Attendance: 42,000; Referee: Jason Jaftha

15 March 2013	Southern Kings	24–35	Chiefs	Nelson Mandela Bay Stadium, Port Elizabeth
19:10	Try: Sergeal Petersen 39'; Jacques Engelbrecht 61'; Con: Demetri Catrakilis 40' (1/2); Pen: Demetri Catrakilis 14', 28', 66', 72' (4/4)	Report; Scoreboard	Try: Lelia Masaga 20', 31', 53'; Sam Cane 50'; Con: Gareth Anscombe 21', 51', 54' (3/4); Pen: Gareth Anscombe 10', 17', 79' (3/4); Cards: Augustine Pulu (yellow card) 60' to 70'	Attendance: 31,803; Referee: Stuart Berry

23 March 2013	Crusaders	55–20	Southern Kings	AMI Stadium, Christchurch
08:35	Try: George Whitelock 4', 24', 75'; Wyatt Crockett 13'; Willi Heinz 31'; Matt Todd 47'; Luke Whitelock 56'; Con: Dan Carter 5', 14', 25', 32', 48' (5/5); Tyler Bleyendaal 56', 76' (2/2); Pen: Dan Carter 9', 43' (2/2)	Report; Scoreboard	Try: Wimpie van der Walt 40'; George Whitehead 79'; Con: Demetri Catrakilis 40' (1/1); George Whitehead 80' (1/1); Pen: Demetri Catrakilis 2', 21' (2/3)	Attendance: 13,515; Referee: Rohan Hoffmann

30 March 2013	Hurricanes	46–30	Southern Kings	Westpac Stadium, Wellington
05:35	Try: Ben May 3'; Conrad Smith 19'; TJ Perenara 30'; Jeremy Thrush 39'; Brad Shields 65'; Alapati Leiua 73'; Con: Beauden Barrett 4', 20', 40', 66', 75' (5/6); Pen: Beauden Barrett 11', 73' (2/3); Drop: Tusi Pisi (0/1)	Report; Scoreboard	Try: Steven Sykes 17'; Ronnie Cooke 49'; Hannes Franklin 76'; Con: Demetri Catrakilis 18', 50' (2/2); George Whitehead 76' (1/1); Pen: Demetri Catrakilis 23', 27', 35' (3/4)	Attendance: 15,103; Referee: Nick Briant

5 April 2013	Brumbies	28–28	Southern Kings	Canberra Stadium, Canberra
10:40	Try: Henry Speight 12'; Joseph Tomane 17'; Con: Christian Lealiifano (0/2); Pen: Christian Lealiifano 4', 37', 51', 70', 78' (5/5); Nic White 30' (1/3)	Report; Scoreboard	Try: Schalk Ferreira 22'; Wimpie van der Walt 33'; Cornell du Preez 46', 83'; Con: George Whitehead 23', 34', 47' (3/3); Demetri Catrakilis 84' (1/1); Pen: George Whitehead (0/1); Cards: Schalk Ferreira (yellow card) 67' to 78'	Attendance: 12,076; Referee: Jaco Peyper

13 April 2013	Rebels	27–30	Southern Kings	AAMI Park, Melbourne
11:40	Try: Ged Robinson 25'; Angus Roberts 39'; Mitch Inman 52'; Con: James O'Connor 26', 40', 53' (3/3); Pen: James O'Connor 32', 46' (2/3); Cards: Jordy Reid (yellow card) 76'	Report; Scoreboard	Try: Ronnie Cooke 9'; Shaun Venter 14'; Wimpie van der Walt 76'; Con: Demetri Catrakilis 10', 15', 77' (3/3); Pen: Demetri Catrakilis 34', 56' (2/3); Drop: Demetri Catrakilis 83' (1/1)	Attendance: 10,416; Referee: Andrew Lees

20 April 2013	Southern Kings	0–34	Bulls	Nelson Mandela Bay Stadium, Port Elizabeth
19:10		Report; Scoreboard	Try: Jan Serfontein 5'; Jano Vermaak 23'; Jacques Potgieter 76'; Akona Ndungane 80'; Con: Morné Steyn 6', 24' (2/2); Louis Fouché 77', 81' (2/2); Pen: Morné Steyn 21' (1/2); Drop: Morné Steyn 34' (1/1); Pierre Spies (0/1)	Attendance: 45,649; Referee: Francisco Pastrana

27 April 2013	Cheetahs	26–12	Southern Kings	Free State Stadium, Bloemfontein
19:10	Try: Raymond Rhule 7'; Lappies Labuschagné 31'; Willie le Roux 45'; Con: Burton Francis 32' (1/3); Pen: Burton Francis 16', 58', 67' (3/3)	Report; Scoreboard	Pen: Demetri Catrakilis 11', 29', 35', 55' (4/5)	Attendance: 19,927; Referee: Jonathon White

4 May 2013	Southern Kings	10–72	Waratahs	Nelson Mandela Bay Stadium, Port Elizabeth
17:05	Try: Sergeal Petersen 39'; Con: Demetri Catrakilis 40' (1/1); Pen: Demetri Catrakilis 10' (1/1)	Report; Scoreboard	Try: Cam Crawford 1', 15', 36'; Israel Folau 6'; Kane Douglas 19'; Michael Hooper 26'; Peter Betham 28', 53'; Dave Dennis 46'; Ben Volavola 73'; Tom Kingston 76'; Con: Brendan McKibbin 7', 16', 26', 29', 54' (5/9); Matt Lucas 74', 77' (2/2); Pen: Brendan McKibbin 12' (1/1)	Attendance: 17,267; Referee: Jonathan Kaplan

11 May 2013	Southern Kings	34–27	Highlanders	Nelson Mandela Bay Stadium, Port Elizabeth
17:05	Try: Luke Watson 29', 40'; Cornell du Preez 51'; Shaun Venter 56'; Con: Demetri Catrakilis 30', 40', 52', 57' (4/4); Pen: Demetri Catrakilis 2', 9' (2/3); Drop: Demetri Catrakilis (0/2)	Report; Scoreboard	Try: Colin Slade 34'; Brad Thorn 37'; Shaun Treeby 70'; Hosea Gear 74'; Con: Colin Slade 35', 38' (2/4); Pen: Colin Slade 16' (1/2); Cards: Tamati Ellison (yellow card) 51' to 61'	Attendance: 18,542; Referee: Jason Jaftha

25 May 2013	Southern Kings	22–34	Cheetahs	Nelson Mandela Bay Stadium, Port Elizabeth
15:00	Try: Nicolas Vergallo 79'; Con: George Whitehead 80' (1/1); Pen: Demetri Catrakilis 3', 12', 23', 34', 47' (5/5); SP Marais (0/1)	Report; Scoreboard	Try: Johann Sadie 39', 55'; Piet van Zyl 51'; Willie le Roux 62'; Con: Elgar Watts 40', 52', 56', 63' (4/4); Pen: Elgar Watts 6', 29' (2/2)	Attendance: 22,023; Referee: Stuart Berry

1 June 2013	Stormers	19–11	Southern Kings	Newlands Stadium, Cape Town
17:05	Try: Deon Fourie 64'; Con: Joe Pietersen 65' (1/1); Pen: Joe Pietersen 4', 10', 48', 58' (4/5)	Report; Scoreboard	Try: Wimpie van der Walt 74'; Con: George Whitehead (0/1); Pen: George Whitehead 16', 55' (2/2); Drop: George Whitehead (0/1)	Referee: Craig Joubert

29 June 2013	Bulls	48–18	Southern Kings	Loftus Versfeld, Pretoria
17:05	Try: Louis Fouché 8'; Chiliboy Ralepelle 29'; Jan Serfontein 31'; Francois Hougaard 34'; Jacques Potgieter 61'; Deon Stegmann 72'; Con: Louis Fouché 9' (1/1); Morné Steyn 30', 32', 35', 62', 73' (5/5); Pen: Morné Steyn 25', 58' (2/3)	Report; Scoreboard	Try: Wimpie van der Walt 40', 53'; Con: Demetri Catrakilis 40' (1/2); Pen: Demetri Catrakilis 13', 17' (2/2)	Referee: Lourens van der Merwe

6 July 2013	Southern Kings	12–24	Stormers	Nelson Mandela Bay Stadium, Port Elizabeth
17:05	Pen: Demetri Catrakilis 2', 10', 24', 59' (4/5); Drop: Demetri Catrakilis (0/1); Cards: Grant Kemp (yellow card) 15' to 25'	Report; Scoreboard	Try: Deon Fourie 39', 77'; Con: Joe Pietersen (0/1); Elton Jantjies 78' (1/1); Pen: Elton Jantjies 14', 56', 71' (3/3); Joe Pietersen 21' (1/1)	Referee: Lourens van der Merwe

13 July 2013	Sharks	58–13	Southern Kings	Kings Park Stadium, Durban
17:05	Try: Marcell Coetzee 6'; Bismarck du Plessis 13'; Odwa Ndungane 17' penalty try 33'; Riaan Viljoen 44'; Tendai Mtawarira 49'; Louis Ludik 57'; Keegan Daniel 73'; Fred Zeilinga 75'; Meyer Bosman 82'; Con: Meyer Bosman 7', 14', 34', 45' (4/9); Jacques Botes (0/1)	Report; Scoreboard	Try: George Whitehead 3'; Mpho Mbiyozo 30'; Con: George Whitehead (0/2); Pen: George Whitehead 24' (1/1); Cards: Devin Oosthuizen (yellow card) 33' to 45'; Hadleigh Parkes (yellow card) 76'	Referee: Stuart Berry

Relegation play-off	26 July 2013	Southern Kings	19–26	Lions	Nelson Mandela Bay Stadium, Port Elizabeth
	19:10	Try: Marcello Sampson 28'; Steven Sykes 70'; Con: Demetri Catrakilis (0/1); George Whitehead (0/1); Pen: Demetri Catrakilis 3', 11', 33' (3/4)	Report; Scoreboard	Try: Stokkies Hanekom 38', 66'; Con: Elton Jantjies 39', 67' (2/2); Pen: Elton Jantjies 9', 14', 18', 22' (4/5); Drop: Marnitz Boshoff (0/1); Cards: Dylan Des Fountain (yellow card) 69' to 78'	Attendance: 27,358; Referee: Jaco Peyper

Relegation play-off	3 August 2013	Lions	18–23	Southern Kings	Ellis Park Stadium, Johannesburg
	17:00	Try: Derick Minnie 35'; Jaco Kriel 55'; Con: Elton Jantjies 56' (1/2); Pen: Elton Jantjies 30', 44' (2/4); Cards: Stokkies Hanekom (yellow card) 66' to 78'	Report; Scoreboard	Try: Schalk Ferreira 68'; Scott van Breda 74'; Con: Scott van Breda 69', 75' (2/2); Pen: Scott van Breda 11', 14', 39' (3/4)	Referee: Stuart Berry

== Player statistics ==
The Super Rugby appearance record for players that represented the Kings in 2013 is as follows:

2013 Southern Kings player statistics
Player name	FOR	SHA	CHI	CRU	HUR	BRU	REB	BUL	CHE	WAR	HIG	CHE	STO	BUL	STO	SHA	LIO	LIO	App	Try	Kck	Pts
Schalk Ferreira	1	1	1	1	1	1	1	1	1	1	1	1	1	1	1		1	1	17	2	0	10
Bandise Maku	2	2	2	2	2	16 (substituted on)	16 (substituted on)	2	2	2	2	2	2	2	2	16 (substituted on)	2	2	18	0	0	0
Kevin Buys	3	3	3	3	3	17 (substituted on)	17 (substituted on)	3	3	3	3	3	3	3		3	3	3	17	0	0	0
David Bulbring	4	18 (substituted on)	5	5	5	18 (substituted on)	18 (substituted on)	5	18 (substituted on)	18 (substituted on)	5	5	5	5	5	5	5	5	18	0	0	0
Steven Sykes	5	4	4		4	4	4	4	4	4	4	4			18 (substituted on)	4	18 (substituted on)	18 (substituted on)	15	2	0	10
Wimpie van der Walt	6	7	7	7	7	7	7	7	7	7	6	6	7	7	7		7	7	17	6	0	30
Luke Watson	7							8	19 (substituted on)	19 (substituted on)	7	7							6	2	0	10
Cornell du Preez	8	6	6	6		8	8	6	6	6	8	8	6	6	6		6	6	16	3	0	15
Shaun Venter	9	9	9	9	9	20 (substituted on)	9	9	9	9	9	9	20 (substituted on)	9	9	21 (substituted on)	9	9	18	2	0	10
Demetri Catrakilis	10	10	10	10	10	22 (substituted on)	10	10	10	10	10	10		10	10		10		15	0	151	151
Marcello Sampson	11	11	11	11		21 (substituted on)	21 (substituted on)	11			11	11	11	11	11	11	11		14	1	0	5
Andries Strauss	12	12	22 (substituted on)		12	12	12	12	12	12	12	12	12	12	12				14	0	0	0
Ronnie Cooke	13	13	13	13	13	11	11	14	13	13	13	13	13	13	13		13	13	17	2	0	10
Sergeal Petersen	14	14	14	14	14	14	14			14									8	4	0	20
SP Marais	15	15	15								22 (substituted on)	15	15	15	15		15	15	10	0	0	0
Edgar Marutlulle	16 (substituted on)	16 (substituted on)	16 (substituted on)	16 (substituted on)															4	0	0	0
Jaco Engels	17 (substituted on)	17 (substituted on)	17 (substituted on)	17 (substituted on)															4	0	0	0
Daniel Adongo	18	19 (substituted on)	19 (substituted on)	4	19 (substituted on)						18 (substituted on)		22						5	0	0	0
Jacques Engelbrecht	19 (substituted on)	8	8	8	8	19 (substituted on)	19 (substituted on)	19 (substituted on)	8	8		19 (substituted on)	8	8	8	8	8	8	17	1	0	5
Johan Herbst	20 (substituted on)																		1	0	0	0
George Whitehead	21	21 (substituted on)	21 (substituted on)	15	15	10	15	15	15	15	15	22 (substituted on)	10	22 (substituted on)	22 (substituted on)	10	21 (substituted on)	10	17	2	21	31
Hadleigh Parkes	22	22 (substituted on)	12	12	11											14	14	11	7	0	0	0
Darron Nell		5											4	4	4	18 (substituted on)	4	4	7	0	0	0
Nicolás Vergallo		20 (substituted on)	20 (substituted on)	20 (substituted on)	20 (substituted on)	9	20	20 (substituted on)	20 (substituted on)	20 (substituted on)	20 (substituted on)	20 (substituted on)	9	20 (substituted on)	20 (substituted on)	9	20	20	14	1	0	5
Tomás Leonardi			18 (substituted on)																1	0	0	0
Rynier Bernardo				18 (substituted on)	18 (substituted on)	5	5	18 (substituted on)	5	5		18 (substituted on)	18 (substituted on)	18 (substituted on)					10	0	0	0
Devin Oosthuizen				19 (substituted on)	6	6	6				19 (substituted on)		19 (substituted on)	19 (substituted on)	19 (substituted on)	7	19 (substituted on)	19 (substituted on)	11	0	0	0
Waylon Murray				21 (substituted on)	21 (substituted on)	13	13	13	21	21 (substituted on)						13	22	12	8	0	0	0
Elric van Vuuren				22 (substituted on)	22 (substituted on)														2	0	0	0
Hannes Franklin					16 (substituted on)	2	2	16 (substituted on)					16 (substituted on)	16 (substituted on)	16 (substituted on)	2	16 (substituted on)	16 (substituted on)	10	1	0	5
Grant Kemp					17 (substituted on)	3	3	17 (substituted on)	17 (substituted on)	17 (substituted on)	17 (substituted on)	17 (substituted on)	17 (substituted on)	17 (substituted on)	3	17 (substituted on)	17 (substituted on)		13	0	0	0
Siviwe Soyizwapi						15	22 (substituted on)	22 (substituted on)	22	22 (substituted on)			14			15			6	0	0	0
Scott van Breda								21 (substituted on)										14	2	1	13	18
Michael Killian									11					14	14	22 (substituted on)			4	0	0	0
Siyanda Grey									14	11	14	14							4	0	0	0
Virgile Lacombe									16 (substituted on)	16 (substituted on)	16 (substituted on)	16 (substituted on)							4	0	0	0
Shane Gates											21 (substituted on)	21 (substituted on)	21	21 (substituted on)	21 (substituted on)	12	12	22 (substituted on)	7	0	0	0
Charl du Plessis															17 (substituted on)	1		17 (substituted on)	3	0	0	0
Mpho Mbiyozo																6			1	1	0	5
Thabo Mamojele																19 (substituted on)			1	0	0	0
Aidon Davis																20 (substituted on)			1	0	0	0
Wesley Dunlop																		21	0	0	0	0
Total																			18	31	185	340

== See also ==
- Southern Kings
- 2013 Super Rugby season
