= Asawa =

Asawa is a surname. Notable people with the surname include:

- Amit Asawa (born 1963), Indian cricketer
- Brian Asawa (1966–2016), American singer
- Ruth Asawa (1926–2013), American sculptor

== See also ==
- Asada (surname)
