= 2011 IRB Nations Cup =

Tournament details
- Countries: Argentina XV; Georgia; Namibia; Portugal; Romania (South Africa) South African Kings
- Tournament format(s): Modified Round-robin
- Date: 10 – 19 June 2011

Tournament statistics
- Teams: 6
- Matches played: 9
- Attendance: 0 (0 per match)
- Tries scored: 37 (4.11 per match)
- Top point scorer(s): Louis Strydom (South African Kings) (47 points)
- Top try scorer(s): Siyanda Grey (South African Kings) (6 tries)

Final
- Champions: (South Africa) South African Kings (1st title)
- Runners-up: Georgia

The 2011 IRB Nations Cup was the sixth edition of the international rugby union tournament, a competition created by the International Rugby Board. It pits the "A" Teams of the stronger (Tier 1) rugby nations (e.g. Argentina Jaguars) against some Tier 2 and 3 nations (e.g. Romania).

For the fifth consecutive year the event was held in Bucharest, Romania. Namibia returned to defend their title, but South African Kings were the overall winners of the tournament.

The competition format was a modified round-robin whereby the three ENC teams (Romania, Georgia and Portugal) played the other three teams (Argentina Jaguars, Namibia and South African Kings). The competition was played over three match days, with three matches played consecutively on each day.

== Final standings ==
2011 IRB Nations Cup
	Team	Played	Won	Drawn	Lost	Points For	Points Against	Points Difference	Tries For	Tries Against	Try Bonus	Losing Bonus	Points
1	(South Africa) South African Kings	3	3	0	0	97	52	+45	10	5	1	0	13
2	Georgia	3	2	0	1	54	62	-8	5	6	0	0	8
3	Argentina XV	3	1	0	2	71	52	+19	8	4	1	2	7
4	Namibia	3	1	0	2	58	59	-1	5	5	0	2	6
5	Romania	3	1	0	2	49	75	-26	3	7	0	1	5
6	Portugal	3	1	0	2	60	89	-29	6	10	0	1	5
Source : irb.com Points breakdown: *4 points for a win *2 points for a draw *1 bonus point for a loss by seven points or less *1 bonus point for scoring four or more tries in a match

== Fixtures ==
=== Round 1 ===
IRB Reports

10 June 2011
17:00 EET (UTC+02)

Romania	13 – 11	Namibia
Try: Carpo 18' c Con: Dumbravă (1/1); Pens: Dumbravă (1/1) 4'; Vlaicu (1/1) 10'; Card: Nere (yellow card) 39' to 49'	Stats	Try: Botha 42' m Pens: Jantjies (1/1) 16'; Botha (1/1) 64'; Card: du Toit (yellow card) 17' to 27'

Stadionul Arcul de Triumf, Bucharest
Referee: Pascal Gauzere (France)

10 June 2011
19:00 EET (UTC+02)

Georgia	17 – 31	(South Africa) South African Kings
Tries: Chkhikvadze 5' c Khamashuridze 22' c Cons: M Urjukashvili (2/2); Pen: M Urjukashvili (1/1) 48'; Cards: Chkhikvadze (yellow card) 44' to 54'; Shvelidze (yellow card) 54' to 64'	Stats	Tries: Grey (3) 13' c, 69' c, 71' m Cons: Strydom (2/3); Pens: Strydom (4/4) 18', 40', 45', 54'; Cards: Newland (yellow card) 29' to 39'; Potgieter (yellow card) 77' to 80'

Stadionul Arcul de Triumf, Bucharest
Referee: Jérôme Garces (France)

10 June 2011
21:00 EET (UTC+02)

Argentina XV	21 – 25	Portugal
Tries: Tuculet 15' c Leonardi 47' c de la Vega 59' c Cons: Iglesias (3/3)	Stats	Tries: Carl Murray 8'mc Le Roux 75' m Pens: Cabral (5/5) 1', 11', 18', 61', 65'

Stadionul Arcul de Triumf, Bucharest
Referee: Andrew Small (England)

=== Round 2 ===
IRB Reports

15 June 2011
17:00 EET (UTC+02)

Georgia	14 – 13	Argentina XV
Try: Gugava 28' m Pens: B Urjukashvili (3/3) 28', 54', 62'; Card: Begadze (yellow card) 25' to 35'	Stats	Try: Ahualli 67' c Con: Iglesias (1/1); Pens: Madero (2/2) 19', 32'

Stadionul Arcul de Triumf, Bucharest
Referee: Pascal Gauzere (France)

15 June 2011
19:00 EET (UTC+02)

Romania	23 – 27	(South Africa) South African Kings
Try: Lazar 10' m Pens: Dumbravă (4/4) 2', 28', 31', 47'; Calafeteanu (2/2) 70', 73'	Stats	Tries: Grey 16' c Strydom 44' m Con: Strydom (1/2); Pens: Strydom (4/4) 5', 14', 33', 51'; DG: Stick (1/1) 54'

Stadionul Arcul de Triumf, Bucharest
Referee: Andrew Small (England)

15 June 2011
21:00 EET (UTC+02)

Portugal	23 – 29	Namibia
Tries: Correia 25' c Le Roux 43' c Cons: Cabral (2/2); Pens: Cabral (2/2) 8', 51'; Serra (1/1) 14'	Stats	Tries: van Wyk 35' c Penalty try 16' c Cons: Kotzé (2/2); Pens: Kotzé (5/5) 5', 28', 40', 49', 70'

Stadionul Arcul de Triumf, Bucharest
Referee: Jérôme Garces (France)

=== Round 3 ===
IRB Reports

19 June 2011
17:00 EET (UTC+02)

Portugal	12 – 39	(South Africa) South African Kings
Tries: Acosta 14' m Severino 36' c Con: Cabral (1/2)	Stats	Tries: Engels 10' m Newland 32' c Potgieter 49' c Grey (2) 60' c, 78' c Cons: Strydom (2/2); Stick (2/2); Pen: Strydom (2/2) 4', 28'

Stadionul Arcul de Triumf, Bucharest
Referee: Pascal Gauzere (France)

19 June 2011
19:00 EET (UTC+02)

Georgia	23 – 18	Namibia
Tries: Samkharadze 34' c Gigauri 44' c Cons: M Urjukashvili (2/2); Pens: M Urjukashvili (3/3) 12', 51', 59'; Card: Chkhikvadze (yellow card) 26' to 36'	Stats	Tries: Winckler 6' m Bock 13' c Con: Jantjies (1/2); Pens: Jantjies (2/2) 9', 46'

Stadionul Arcul de Triumf, Bucharest
Referee: Andrew Small (England)

19 June 2011
21:00 EET (UTC+02)

Romania	13 – 37	Argentina XV
Try: Tonița 12' c Con: Vlaicu (1/1); Pens: Calafeteanu (2/2) 28', 36'	Stats	Tries: Tuculet (3) 32' c, 60' c, 80'c López 46' c Cons: Iglesias (3/3); Madero (1/1); Pens: Iglesias (2/2) 15', 39'; DG: Tuculet (1/1) 21'

Stadionul Arcul de Triumf, Bucharest
Referee: Jérôme Garces (France)

== Top scorers ==
=== Top points scorers ===
Rank	Player	Team	Points
1	Louis Strydom	(South Africa) South African Kings	47
2	Siyanda Grey	(South Africa) South African Kings	30
3	Pedro Cabral	Portugal	27
4	Joaquín Tuculet	Argentina XV	23
5	Santiago González Iglesias	Argentina XV	20
5	Malkhaz Urjukashvili	Georgia	20
7	Theuns Kotzé	Namibia	19
8	Dănuț Dumbravă	Romania	17
9	Valentin Calafeteanu	Romania	12
10	Eugene Jantjies	Namibia	11

Source: irb.com

=== Top try scorers ===
Rank	Player	Team	Tries
1	Siyanda Grey	(South Africa) South African Kings	6
2	Joaquín Tuculet	Argentina XV	4
3	Jacques Le Roux	Portugal	2
4	24 players		1

Source: irb.com

== See also ==
- 2011 IRB Pacific Nations Cup
