= Siyanda =

- Gender: Unisex
- Language: Nguni language

Other gender
- Masculine: Bayanda
- Feminine: Ziyanda

Origin
- Meaning: To increase, grow, multiply

Other names
- Variant forms: Sisanda, Asanda, Ayanda
- Nicknames: Siya, Yanda

Siyanda is a unisex given name, derivated from the Nguni name ukwanda meaning to expand/to grow/ increase. Notable people with the name include:

- Siyanda Grey (born 1989), South African rugby union player
- Siyanda Mohutsiwa (born 1993), Motswana writer and speaker
- Siyanda Msani (born 2001), South African soccer player
- Siyanda Ndlovu (born 2002), South African soccer player
- Siyanda Xulu (born 1991), South African soccer player
- Siyanda Zwane (born 1985), South African soccer player
