= Hanekom =

Hanekom is an Afrikaans surname. Notable people with the surname include:

- Derek Hanekom (born 1953), South African politician
- Morné Hanekom (born 1988), South African rugby union player
- Stokkies Hanekom (born 1989), South African rugby union player
