= Asada =

Asada may refer to:

- Asada (surname)
- Asada Domain, a Japanese domain of the Edo period, located in Settsu Province
- Asada (crater), a crater on the moon named after Goryu Asada

== See also ==
- Australian Sports Anti-Doping Authority
- Carne asada, grilled beef
- Asado
