= Asanda =

Asanda may refer to:

- Asanda, Haryana, a village in Bahadurgarh tehsil, Jhajjar district, Haryana, India
- Asandas Classical Talkies, a film production company which produced Bhakta Nandanar
- Asanda (song), a song by Kususa and Argento Dust featuring Zakes Bantwini

== Name ==
Asanda is a unisex given name, derivated from the Nguni name ukwanda meaning to expand/to grow/ increase. Notable people with the name include:

- Asanda Hadebe (born 2003), South African soccer player
- Asanda Sishuba (born 1980), South African soccer player
- Asanda Jezile (born 2001), British singer

== See also ==
- Asada (disambiguation)
- Asana (disambiguation)
