= Wayne van Heerden =

South African rugby union player

- Born: 29 March 1979 (age 47) Graaff-Reinet
- Height: 1.97 m (6 ft 5 1/2 in)
- Weight: 106 kg (234 lb; 16 st 10 lb)
- School: Spandau Secondary School, Graaff-Reinet; Hoërskool Brandwag, Uitenhage

Rugby union career
- Position: Lock
- Current team: Port Elizabeth Police
Youth career
- 1999–2000: Mighty Elephants
Amateur team(s)
Years	Team	Apps	(Points)
2015–present	Port Elizabeth Police	4	(0)
Senior career
Years	Team	Apps	(Points)
2000–2005	Mighty Elephants	75	(100)
2002–2003	Sharks	15	(5)
2006–2008	Griquas	70	(50)
2009	Cheetahs	13	(10)
2010–2011	Suntory Sungoliath	21	(15)
2011–2013	Eastern Province Kings	46	(10)
- Correct as of 30 March 2015
International career
Years	Team	Apps	(Points)
1997–1998	S.A. Schools		
1998	South Africa Under-19		
2000	South Africa Under-21	3	(5)
2001	S.A. Under-23	3	(10)
2001–2002	S.A. 'A'	4	(0)
2001–2005	South Africa 7s		
2011	South African Kings	3	(0)
- Correct as of 21 February 2013

Wayne van Heerden (born 29 March 1979) is a former South African rugby union player, who played mainly as a flanker for the majority of his career before becoming a lock towards the end of his career. He made in excess of 200 first class appearances and retired from professional rugby at the end of the 2013 season.

He currently plays amateur club rugby for Eastern Province Grand Challenge side Port Elizabeth Police.

== Career ==
=== Mighty Elephants ===
He made his first class debut for Port Elizabeth-based side Mighty Elephants in 2000, playing for them in the domestic Currie Cup and Vodacom Cup competitions for the next six seasons, mainly in the First Division. During this time, he was also included in the Sharks Super Rugby squad in 2002 and 2003.

=== Griquas ===
At the start of the 2006 season, he moved to Kimberley to join Griquas, where he plied his trade between 2006 and 2009. He also experienced some Super Rugby action during this time, making thirteen appearances for the Cheetahs during the 2009 Super 14 season.

=== Suntory Sungoliath ===
In 2010, he moved to Japanese side Suntory Sungoliath, where he played during the 2009–10 and 2010–11 Top League seasons.

=== Eastern Province Kings ===
He returned to the Eastern Cape at the conclusion of the 2010–11 Top League season, rejoining former side Mighty Elephants – which was rebranded the Eastern Province Kings in 2010 – during the 2011 Vodacom Cup season and made just short of 50 appearances for them during his second spell at the side.

He was initially named in the Southern Kings wider training squad for their inaugural season of Super Rugby in 2013, but was subsequently released to their Vodacom Cup squad.

He announced his retirement after the conclusion of the 2013 Currie Cup First Division season.

=== Representative rugby ===
Van Heerden also made several appearances for various South African national sides – he played for the South African Schools side in 1997 and 1998, as well as for the Under-19 national side in 1998. He also played for South Africa at Under-21 level in 2000, at Under-23 level in 2001 and for a South African 'A' side in 2001 and 2002.

He joined the rugby sevens circuit in 2001 and represented the South African Sevens side – nicknamed the Blitzbokke – between 2001 and 2005.

In 2011, he also played for the South African Kings at the 2011 IRB Nations Cup competition.
