= Pedro Cabral (rugby union) =

Portuguese rugby union player

- Born: 29 June 1983 (age 43) Lisbon
- Height: 5 ft 11 in (1.80 m)
- Weight: 191 lb (87 kg)

Rugby union career
- Position(s): Fullback; Flyhalf
International career
Years	Team	Apps	(Points)
2006–2011	Portugal	37	(184)

Pedro Cabral (born 29 June 1983) is a Portuguese rugby union player. He plays as a fly-half and as a fullback.

He is currently a member of CDUL. He also plays for Lusitanos XV for the Amlin Challenge Cup.

He has 37 caps for Portugal, from 2006 to 2011, with 2 tries, 24 conversions, 37 penalties and 5 drop goals, 184 points on aggregate. He was called for the 2007 Rugby World Cup, playing in the games with Scotland and Italy, without scoring.
