= Wayne Stevens (rugby union) =

South African rugby union player

- Full name: Ivan Wayne Stevens
- Born: 17 May 1988 (age 38) Bloemfontein
- Height: 1.85 m (6 ft 1 in)
- Weight: 86 kg (190 lb; 13 st 8 lb)
- School: Grey College
- University: University of the Free State

Rugby union career
- Position: Centre
- Current team: Griquas
Youth career
- 2004–2009: Free State Cheetahs
Amateur team(s)
Years	Team	Apps	(Points)
2008–2010	UFS Shimlas	14	(15)
Senior career
Years	Team	Apps	(Points)
2009–2010	Free State Cheetahs	10	(5)
2010–2013	Eastern Province Kings	56	(65)
2014–2015	Griquas	21	(5)
2009–2015	Total	87	(75)
- Correct as of 11 October 2014
International career
Years	Team	Apps	(Points)
2008	South Africa Students	1	(0)
2011	South African Kings	3	(0)
2012	South African Barbarians (South)	1	(0)
- Correct as of 23 February 2013

Ivan Wayne Stevens (born 17 May 1988) is a South African former rugby union footballer, who played professional rugby between 2009 and 2015. He represented the Free State Cheetahs, Eastern Province Kings and Griquas at provincial level during his career and also played for the South African Kings at the 2011 IRB Nations Cup and for a South African Barbarians (South) side against England.

== Career ==
He started his career playing for the Free State Cheetahs in various youth competitions, such as the Grant Khomo Week. He made his full debut for the team in the 2009 Vodacom Cup and also represented the Shimlas in the Varsity Cup competition. In 2010, he joined the Eastern Province Kings in time for the 2010 Currie Cup First Division season.

He was named captain of a South African Barbarians (South) team to face England during the 2012 mid-year rugby test series. He was initially named in the Southern Kings squad for the 2013 Super Rugby season, but was later released to the 2013 Vodacom Cup squad.

He joined Griquas for the 2014 season.

He retired after the 2015 Vodacom Cup tournament to pursue a career as a financial advisor in Polokwane.
