= Jaco Bekker =

South African rugby union player

- Born: Jacobus Christiaan Bekker; 17 May 1983 (age 43) Port Elizabeth
- Height: 1.83 m (6 ft 0 in)
- Weight: 94 kg (14 st 11 lb)
- School: Gill College

Rugby union career
- Position: Centre
- Current team: Eastern Province Kings
Provincial / State sides
| Years | Team | Apps | (Points) |
| 2003–2005 | Leopards | | |
| 2006–2009 | Griquas | 43 | (10) |
| 2010–2012 | Eastern Province Kings | 30 | (20) |
- Correct as of 20 May 2012

Jaco Bekker (born 17 May 1983) is a South African rugby union player.

After playing youth rugby for the Falcons, he made his professional debut for the Leopards in 2003. He played there for 3 seasons, before moving to Griquas, where he stayed another 4 seasons. In 2010, he returned to Port Elizabeth to join the Eastern Province Kings.
