= Joe Breytenbach =

South African rugby union player

- Born: Johannes Christiaan Breytenbach; 17 November 1983 (age 42) Tzaneen, South Africa
- Height: 1.80 m (5 ft 11 in)
- Weight: 95 kg (14 st 13 lb)
- School: Hoërskool Ben Vorster

Rugby union career
- Position: Wing
- Current team: Eastern Province Kings
Provincial / State sides
Years	Team	Apps	(Points)
2009–2011	SWD Eagles	35	(30)
2011	Eastern Province Kings	7	(5)
- Correct as of 26 November 2011

Joe Breytenbach (born 17 November 1983) is a South African former rugby union player.

He was born in Tzaneen and joined the SWD Eagles from 2009. In 2011, he joined the Eastern Province Kings for a six-month spell.
