= Clint Newland =

New Zealand rugby union player

- Full name: Clint John Newland
- Born: 26 March 1980 (age 46) Dannevirke, New Zealand
- Height: 1.96 m (6 ft 5 in)
- Weight: 134 kg (295 lb)
- School: New Plymouth Boys' High School

Rugby union career
- Position: Prop
Youth career
- Napier Pirates
Senior career
Years	Team	Apps	(Points)
1999–2010	Hawke's Bay	106	(70)
2008–2010	Highlanders	35	(4)
2010–2011	Leinster	12	(0)
2011–2012	Eastern Province Kings	32	(25)
- Correct as of 31 Oct 2012
International career
Years	Team	Apps	(Points)
2008	Māori	1	(0)
2011	South African Kings	3	(5)
- Correct as of 09:18, 14 Aug 2012 (UTC)

Clint Newland is a New Zealand rugby union player.

== Career ==
=== New Zealand ===
Newland was born in Dannevirke and attended New Plymouth Boys' High School as a boarder. In 1999, he made his provincial debut for Hawke's Bay against Poverty Bay in the NPC. He played in the NZ Divisional XV from 2002 to 2005 when the competition was revised to increase the number of NPC teams. He played in every match until 2007 when he was served a 10-week ban for knocking out Wellington prop Neemia Tialata.

In 2008, he won selection to the Highlanders Super Rugby squad. He was also selected for the NZ Māori team, but played just one game before a shoulder injury ruled him out of successive matches. He returned to the Highlanders and Hawke's Bay squads for the 2009 and 2010 seasons.

=== Ireland ===
In November 2010, Irish team Leinster announced the signing of Newland on a short-term contract, running until February 2011. He had limited playing time during his time at Leinster.

=== South Africa ===
When his Leinster contract expired, he signed for South African domestic team Eastern Province Kings. He represented them in the domestic Currie Cup and Vodacom Cup competitions and also played for the South African Kings at the 2011 IRB Nations Cup in Romania, also scoring a try against Portugal.

He left the Kings at the end of the 2012 Currie Cup First Division season, having played for the Kings for two seasons, making 32 appearances.

== International ==
Newland made his debut for the NZ Māori in 2008.

== Achievements ==
- 2005 – 2nd Division Player of the Year
