= Matthew Tayler-Smith =

South African rugby union player

- Full name: Matthew Tayler-Smith
- Born: 22 April 1987 (age 39) Port Elizabeth
- Height: 1.79 m (5 ft 10 1/2 in)
- Weight: 88 kg (194 lb; 13 st 12 lb)
- School: Grey High School

Rugby union career
- Position: Fly-half
Youth career
- 2005: Eastern Province Kings
Senior career
| Years | Team | Apps | (Points) |
| 2010–2012 | Eastern Province Kings | 28 | (24) |
- Correct as of 3 May 2013

Matthew Tayler-Smith (born 22 April 1987) is a South African rugby union player.

He played for Maties in the Varsity Cup. He played for the Eastern Province Kings between 2010 and 2012.
