= Jaco van Schalkwyk =

South African rugby union player

- Born: Hendrik Jacobus van Schalkwyk; 13 September 1979 (age 47) Vanwyksvlei, South Africa
- Height: 1.80 m (5 ft 11 in)
- Weight: 84 kg (13 st 3 lb)
- School: Paarl Boys' High School
- University: University of Stellenbosch

Rugby union career
- Position: Fly-half
Provincial / State sides
Years	Team	Apps	(Points)
2001	Western Province		
2002–2005	Free State Cheetahs		
2006–2008	Golden Lions	33	(49)
2009–2011	Eastern Province Kings	19	(75)
- Correct as of 26 November 2011
Super Rugby
Years	Team	Apps	(Points)
2003	Cats		
2007–2008	Lions	25	(24)
National sevens team
Years	Team		Comps
2003–2004	South Africa 7s		

Jaco van Schalkwyk (born 13 September 1979) is a former South African rugby union player and currently a coach at the Future Kings.

He started his career with Western Province until 2002, when he moved to the Free State Cheetahs. During his spell there, he played Super Rugby for the Cats, as well as playing for the South Africa sevens team in 2003 to 2004. In 2006, he joined the Golden Lions, also playing for the Lions in Super Rugby. In 2009, he joined the Eastern Province Kings, where he played until 2011 before taking up a coaching role with the Future Kings.
