= Asada (crater) =

Crater on the Moon

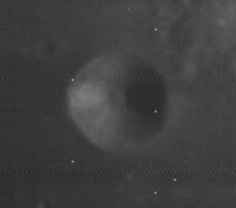
- Lunar Orbiter 4 image
- Coordinates: 7.3°N 49.9°E
- Diameter: 12.37 km (7.69 mi)
- Depth: 2.13 km (1.32 mi)
- Colongitude: 310° at sunrise
- Eponym: Goryu Asada

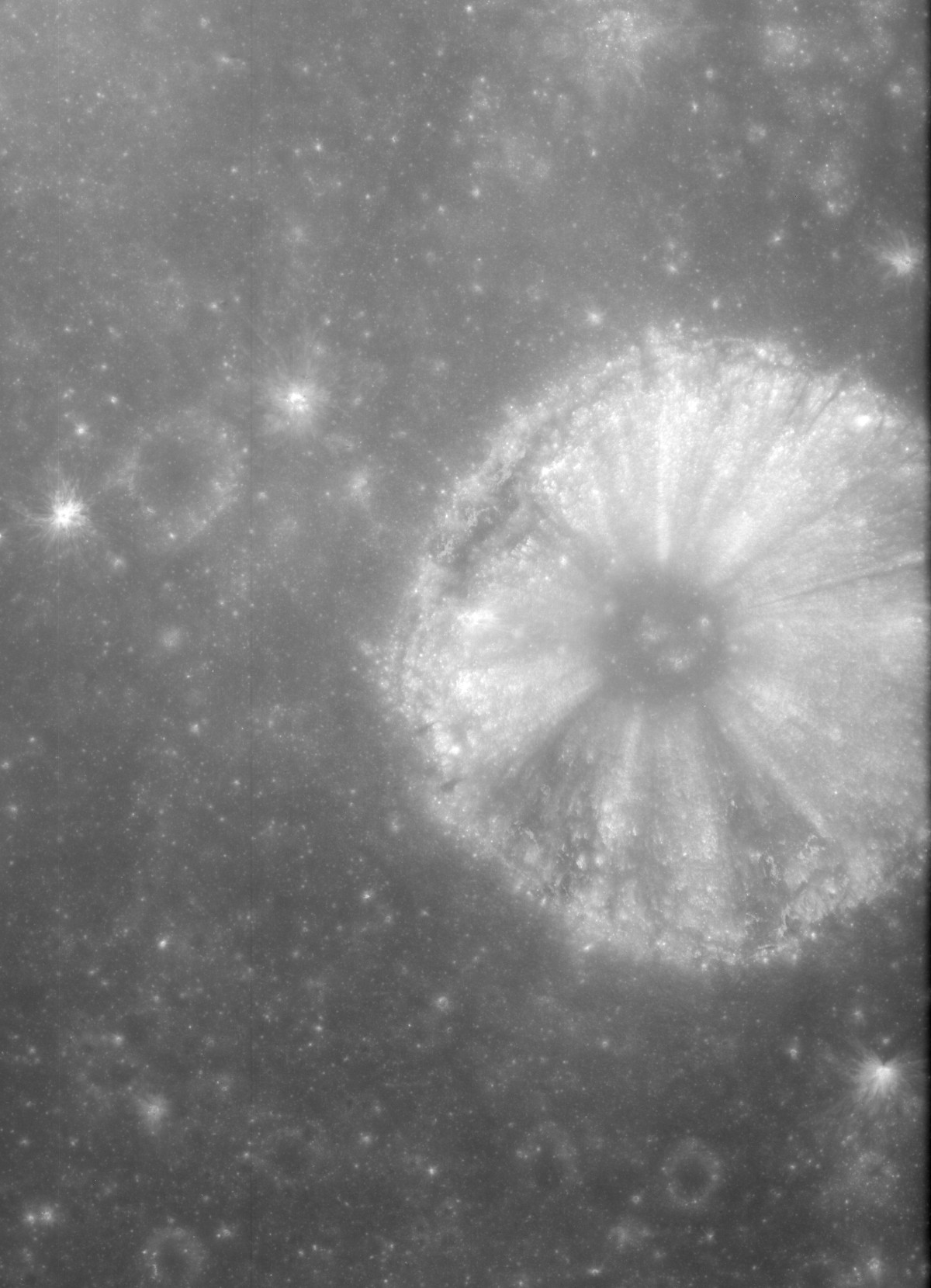
Apollo 17 panoramic camera image of most of Asada crater

Asada is a small lunar impact crater located at the northern edge of Mare Fecunditatis, to the northeast of the crater Taruntius. It is a circular crater formation with inner walls that slope down toward a small central floor at the midpoint.

This crater is named after Japanese physician and astronomer Goryu Asada (1734–1799). Its designation was officially adopted by the International Astronomical Union in 1976. Asada was designated Taruntius A prior to being assigned a name.
