= Barend Pieterse =

South African rugby union player

- Full name: Barend Hermanus Pieterse
- Born: 23 January 1979 (age 47) Virginia, South Africa
- Height: 1.96 m (6 ft 5 in)
- Weight: 108 kg (238 lb; 17 st 0 lb)
- School: Hoërskool Waterkloof
- University: Rand Afrikaans University

Rugby union career
- Position: Lock
Youth career
- 2000: Golden Lions
Senior career
Years	Team	Apps	(Points)
2001–2004	Golden Lions		
2005–2010	Free State Cheetahs		
2005	Cats		
2006–2010	Cheetahs	33	(10)
2011–2012	Eastern Province Kings	16	(25)
- Correct as of 31 October 2012
International career
Years	Team	Apps	(Points)
2007	South Africa	1	(5)
2011	South African Kings	2	(0)
- Correct as of 14 August 2012
Coaching career
- Years: Team
- 2013–present: Southern Kings (lineout coach)
- 2016–present: Eastern Province Kings (head coach)

Barend Pieterse (born 23 January 1979) is a South African former rugby union footballer and currently the lineout coach of the Eastern Province Kings and Southern Kings.

== Career ==
He started playing his rugby for the Golden Lions in 2001. He played for them until 2004, when he moved to the Free State Cheetahs. Between 2004 and 2010, he also frequently represented the Cats and Cheetahs franchises in the Super Rugby competition. This culminated in a call-up to the South Africa national rugby union team, becoming Springbok No 793. However, he never played a test match for the Springboks, his only appearance was in the 5–22 defeat against the Barbarians in London on 1 December 2007, when he scored the only try of the game for the visitors.

He joined the Eastern Province Kings for the 2011 season, making 16 appearances. Although he was included in the Kings' 2012 Vodacom Cup and Currie Cup squads, he did not play any games, but took up a role as a lineout coach. He retired at the end of 2012 and became the lineout coach for the Southern Kings.
