= Danie Faasen =

South African rugby union player

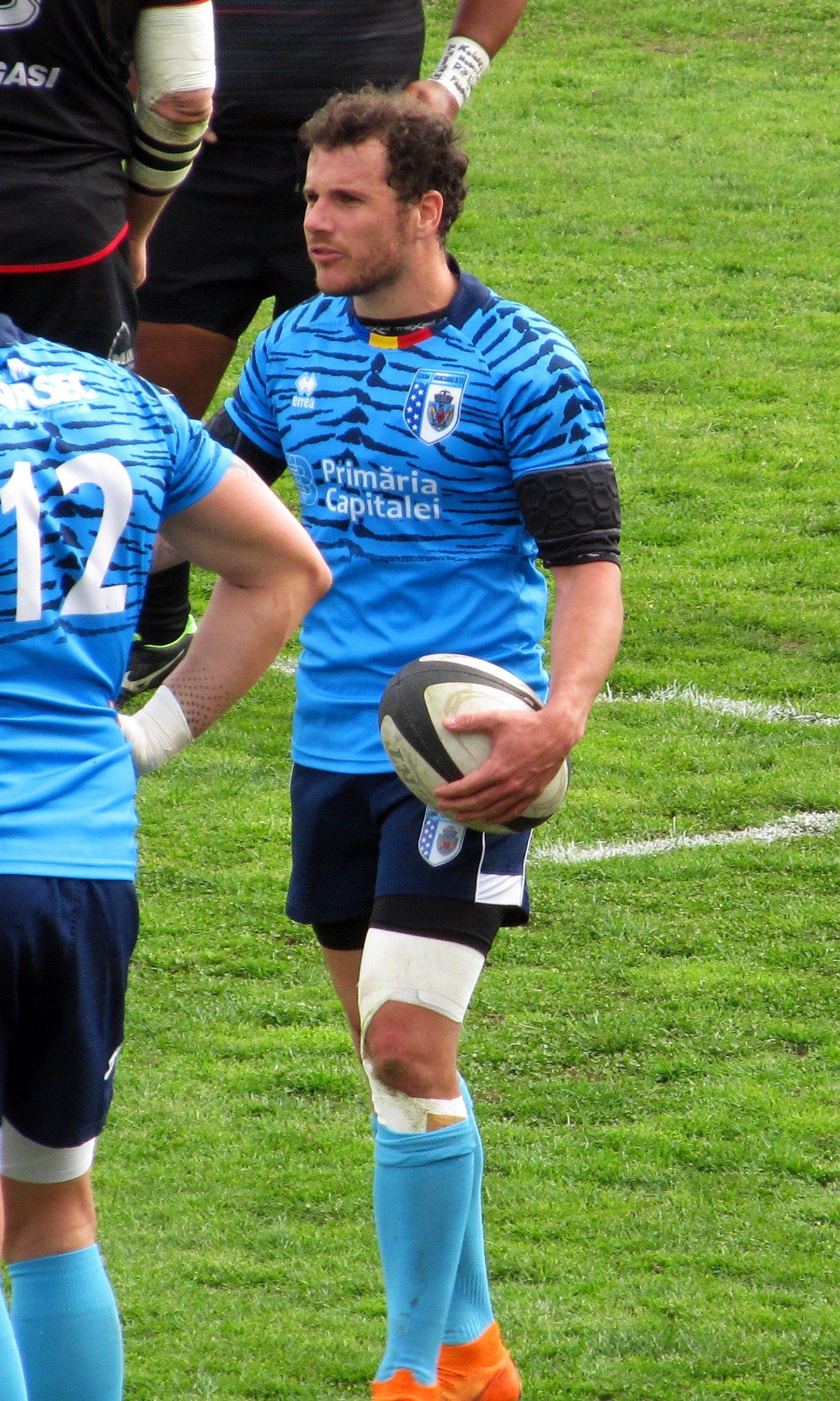
- Danie Faasen playing for CSM București during the 2019 Cupa României Final
- Full name: Daniel Cornelius Faasen
- Born: 11 November 1989 (age 37) Middelburg
- Height: 1.76 m (5 ft 9 1/2 in)
- Weight: 82 kg (181 lb; 12 st 13 lb)
- School: Afrikaanse Hoër Seunskool, Pretoria
- University: University of Pretoria

Rugby union career
- Position: Scrum-half
- Current team: CSM București
Youth career
- 2005–2010: Blue Bulls
Amateur team(s)
Years	Team	Apps	(Points)
2011–2013	UP Tuks	14	(15)
Senior career
Years	Team	Apps	(Points)
2010	Blue Bulls	7	(5)
2011–2012	Eastern Province Kings	23	(10)
2014	SWD Eagles	10	(0)
2014–2015	Rugby Badia		
2015–2016	L'Aquila	7	(47)
2016–2019	CSM București	19	(94)
- Correct as of 10 December 2018
International career
Years	Team	Apps	(Points)
2011	South African Kings	3	(0)
- Correct as of 14 August 2012

Daniel Cornelius Faasen (born 11 November 1989) is a South African rugby union player.

== Career ==
He represented the Blue Bulls at various youth tournaments, culminating in his involvement in the 2010 Vodacom Cup and Currie Cup squads. He also represented UP Tuks in the 2011 Varsity Cup. He then joined the Eastern Province Kings for the 2011 Currie Cup season.

After two years at the Kings, he left and rejoined UP Tuks for the 2013 Varsity Cup. He didn't play any first class rugby in 2013 despite being named in the Blue Bulls Currie Cup squad, but joined George-based side SWD Eagles prior to the 2014 season.

In 2014, Faasen moved to Italy to play for Serie A side Rugby Badia. After one season at Badia, Faasen joined National Championship of Excellence side L'Aquila.
