= Ronnie Uys =

South African rugby union player

- Born: Phillipus Rudolph Uys; 19 April 1979 (age 47) Pretoria
- Height: 1.87 m (6 ft 1 1/2 in)
- Weight: 130 kg (20 st 7 lb)
- School: FH Odendaal, Pretoria

Rugby union career
- Position: Prop
- Current team: RC Narbonne
Senior career
| Years | Team | Apps | (Points) |
| 2011–present | RC Narbonne | | |
Provincial / State sides
| Years | Team | Apps | (Points) |
| 2005–2007 | Leopards | | |
| 2007 | Sharks (Currie Cup) | 10 | (0) |
| 2008 | Free State Cheetahs | 1 | (0) |
- Griffons
| 2008 | Pumas | 6 | (0) |
| 2009–2010 | Eastern Province Kings | 32 | (20) |
- Correct as of 17 October 2011
Super Rugby
| Years | Team | Apps | (Points) |
| 2008 | Cheetahs | 2 | (0) |

Ronnie Uys (born 19 April 1979) is a South African rugby union player, currently playing with RC Narbonne in the French Rugby Pro D2 competition.

He played for the Leopards between 2005 and 2007. He then had short spells at the Sharks, Free State Cheetahs and Griffons before joining the Pumas in 2009. After helping the Pumas secure their spot in the 2011 Currie Cup Premier Division by beating the Eastern Province Kings in the 2010 Currie Cup promotion/relegation series, he then joined the Eastern Province Kings in 2011, but was released after just one season.
