= Amit Asawa =

Indian cricketer (born 1963)

Personal information
- Full name: Amit Bhanwarlal Asawa
- Born: 12 September 1963 (age 63); Indore, Madhya Pradesh
- Batting: Right-handed
- Bowling: Right-arm offbreak
- Role: Batsman

Domestic team information
- Years: Team
- 1984-1991: Rajasthan
- Source: ESPNcricinfo, 26 June 2016

Amit Asawa (born 12 September 1963) is an Indian first-class cricketer who played for Rajasthan. He was head coach of Rajasthan when they emerged champions of the Ranji Trophy in 2010/11 and 2011/12 seasons. He was born at Indore.
