= Asada (surname) =

Asada (written: 浅田 or 麻田) is a Japanese surname. Notable people with the surname include:

- Akira Asada (浅田 彰, born 1957), Japanese critic and curator
- Daiki Asada (浅田 大樹, born 1989), Japanese footballer
- Asada Goryu (麻田 剛立, 1734–1799), Japanese astronomer
- Jirō Asada (浅田 次郎, born 1951), pen name of Kojirō Iwato (岩戸 康次郎), Japanese writer
- Mai Asada (浅田 舞, born 1988), Japanese figure skater
- Mao Asada (浅田 真央, born 1990), Japanese figure skater
- Miyoko Asada (浅田 美代子, born 1956), Japanese actress and singer
- Seigo Asada (浅田 斉吾, born 1980), Japanese darts player
- Yōko Asada (浅田 葉子, born 1969), Japanese voice actress

== Fictional characters ==
- Shino Asada (朝田 詩乃), also known as Sinon, from Sword Art Online
