= Ross Kennedy =

NZ rugby union player

- Born: Ross Kennedy; 25 September 1982 (age 44) Wellington, New Zealand
- Height: 1.97 m (6 ft 5 1/2 in)
- Weight: 111 kg (17 st 7 lb)
- School: Christchurch Boys' High School
- University: Victoria University

Rugby union career
- Position: Lock
- Current team: Crusaders
Provincial / State sides
Years	Team	Apps	(Points)
2002–2006	Wellington	48	(5)
2006	Counties Manukau	5	(0)
- Otago
2007–2008	Hawke's Bay	14	(5)
2009–2010	Eastern Province	26	(5)
2011	Hawke's Bay	19	(5)
- Correct as of 17 October 2011
Super Rugby
Years	Team	Apps	(Points)
2003–2006	Hurricanes	28	(10)
2009	Highlanders	0	(0)
2012	Crusaders	1	(0)
- Correct as of 29 July 2012

Ross Kennedy (born 25 September 1982 in Wellington, New Zealand) is a rugby union player formerly played for the Crusaders.

== Playing career ==
Kennedy was marked as a future star when he claimed a starting spot at lock for Wellington in the 2002 provincial rugby season, aged only 19. He earned a spot with the Hurricanes for the 2003 Super 12 season, and by 2004 was a starter for the Hurricanes as well.

His career continued on the ascendancy through the 2005 Super 12 season, where he started 12 games for the Hurricanes, scored two tries, and played some of the finest rugby of his career. However, from this point forward, he would be blighted by injuries and lose momentum. After missing much of the 2005 provincial season, he was limited to just 4 substitute appearances in the 2006 Super 14 season - his final appearances at that level - and found himself on loan to Counties Manukau for part of the 2006 Air New Zealand Cup.

Kennedy signed with Otago for the 2007 Air New Zealand Cup, but again found himself sidelined for most of the season with injury. A healthier 2008 saw him selected to the Highlanders squad for the 2009 Super 14 season, although he failed to see any game action.

Kennedy signed with Hawkes Bay for the 2009 Air New Zealand Cup, where he would have his finest season in years as he started 14 games in helping the Magpies to the semi-finals of the competition. He continued as a regular starter through 2010.

Kennedy signed with the Eastern Province Kings for 2011, joining his father Adrian Kennedy, who is the forwards coach at the Kings.

He joined the Crusaders for the 2012 Super Rugby season.
