= Asada Goryu =

Japanese astronomer

Asada Gōryū (麻田 剛立; March 10, 1734 – June 25, 1799) was a Japanese physician and astronomer who helped integrate western and Japanese astronomy in the Edo period. He introduced several western astronomical instruments and methods into Japan and independently confirmed Kepler's third law.

Asada was the pseudonym based on the name of his village. Born (birthday given as 6 February 1734, Japanese year Kyoho) as Yasuakira Ayabe, his father, Keisai Ayabe came from a landed Kitsuki clan from Bungo, Kyushu. Asada spent much of his career in the flourishing commercial city of Osaka, where he practiced medicine for a living. He, then, took over his father's practice as an official physician in 1767. Because of the Japanese government's policy of seclusion, Western scientific theory was generally available only through obsolete Chinese works edited by Jesuit missionaries in China. Yet Asada managed to construct sophisticated mathematical models of celestial movements and is sometimes credited with the independent discovery of Kepler's third law. Asada also studied anatomy in western texts and his learnings were incorporated into a compilation by his friend Riken Nakai (1732-1817) in Esso-rohitsu (1773).

The crater Asada on the Moon is named after him.
