= Boetie Britz =

South African rugby union player

- Full name: Coenraad Johannes Britz
- Born: 28 July 1987 (age 39) Mossel Bay
- Height: 1.85 m (6 ft 1 in)
- Weight: 99 kg (218 lb; 15 st 8 lb)
- School: Oakdale Agricultural High School, Riversdale
- University: Elsenburg

Rugby union career
- Position: Flanker
Youth career
- 2005: SWD Eagles
- 2006–2008: Western Province
Senior career
Years	Team	Apps	(Points)
2008–2009	Western Province	13	(10)
2011–2013	Eastern Province Kings	31	(20)
- Correct as of 16 September 2013
International career
Years	Team	Apps	(Points)
2005	S.A. Schools		
2006	South Africa Under-19		
- Correct as of 21 February 2013

Boetie Britz (born 28 July 1987) is a South African rugby union player, who can play as a loose-forward or a hooker.

After representing the SWD Eagles at the Craven Week and making the South African schools team in 2005, as well as the SA Under-19 team in the 2006 World Championships, he then represented Western Province at Under 19, Under 21 and Vodacom Cup level between 2007 and 2009, where his career was hampered by a series of injuries. In 2009 and 2010, he played for Maties in the FNB Varsity Cup, helping them to two championships.

He joined the Eastern Province Kings for the 2011 season. He was named in the Southern Kings wider training squad for the 2013 Super Rugby season, but was subsequently released to the Vodacom Cup squad.
