= Mpho Mbiyozo =

South African rugby union player (born 1983)

- Full name: Mpho Mzukisi Mbiyozo
- Born: 7 February 1983 (age 43) Lusikisiki, South Africa
- Height: 1.82 m (5 ft 11 1/2 in)
- Weight: 94 kg (207 lb; 14 st 11 lb)
- School: Grey High School
- University: University of Cape Town

Rugby union career
- Position: Flanker
Youth career
- 2002–2003: Western Province
Senior career
Years	Team	Apps	(Points)
2005–2007	Western Province	18	(10)
2008	→ Boland Cavaliers	1	(0)
2010–2013	Eastern Province Kings	54	(50)
2013	Southern Kings	1	(5)
2014–2015	Vigo	20	(50)
- Correct as of 11 October 2013
International career
Years	Team	Apps	(Points)
2008	South Africa Sevens		
2009	Southern Kings	1	(5)
2011	South African Kings	1	(0)
2012	South African Barbarians (South)	1	(0)
- Correct as of 21 February 2013

Mpho Mbiyozo (born 7 February 1983) is a former South African rugby union player who played with Western Province and the Eastern Province Kings between 2005 and 2013. He usually played as a flanker.

He is currently a coach at the Boland Cavaliers' academy, the Boland Rugby Institute, having previously been the skills and lineout coach with Western Province and also being involved with the Kenyan national team.

== Career ==
=== Youth ===
He was born in Lusikisiki, went to school at Grey High School in Port Elizabeth and represented Western Province in various youth competitions until being included in the 2005 Vodacom Cup squad.

=== Senior career ===
In 2006, he was called into the South African Sevens rugby team, making some domestic appearances for Western Province and the Boland Cavaliers. He represented the national sevens team until 2009, when he announced he wanted to return to the fifteen-a-side game. He joined the Eastern Province Kings in 2010.

Mpho also made history during the 2009 British & Irish Lions tour to South Africa, when he became the first player to score a try for the newly created Southern Kings rugby franchise.

=== 2013 Southern Kings Super Rugby season ===
He was included in the Southern Kings squad for the 2013 Super Rugby season, but failed to make any of their initial matchday squads. Instead, he was the regular captain of the Eastern Province Kings team in their 2013 Vodacom Cup campaign, leading them to their best performance up to that point in the Vodacom Cup by reaching the semi-finals. He played in seven of their nine games that season and scored three tries, making him the joint top try scorer for the EP Kings in that competition.

He was eventually named as a starter for the Southern Kings for their final Super Rugby match of the regular 2013 Super Rugby season against the Sharks.

=== Vigo ===
Mbiyozo also had a season playing for Spanish side Vigo in the 2014–15 División de Honor de Rugby. He made 20 appearances and scored 10 tries, to finish in the top ten of the try-scoring charts of the competition. However, despite his efforts, his side finished bottom of the log to be relegated to the División de Honor B de Rugby.
