= Morné Hanekom =

South African rugby union player

- Born: 15 February 1988 (age 38) Malmesbury, South Africa
- Height: 1.94 m (6 ft 4 1/2 in)
- Weight: 112 kg (247 lb; 17 st 9 lb)
- School: Boland Agricultural High School
- University: University of Stellenbosch

Rugby union career
- Position: No 8
- Current team: Leopards
Youth career
- 2004–2008: Western Province
Amateur team(s)
Years	Team	Apps	(Points)
2009	Maties	7	(0)
Senior career
Years	Team	Apps	(Points)
2009	Western Province	1	(0)
2010	Griquas	0	(0)
2010–2011	Eastern Province Kings	7	(10)
2011–present	Leopards	47	(60)
- Correct as of 6 October 2014

Morné Hanekom (born 15 February 1988) is a South African rugby union player, currently playing with the Leopards.

He was born in Malmesbury and represented Western Province at various youth levels. He was included in the Western Province squad for the 2009 Vodacom Cup and played for the University of Stellenbosch in the FNB Varsity Cup in 2008 and 2009. In 2010, he joined Griquas for the 2010 Vodacom Cup competition, but then moved to the Eastern Province Kings for the Currie Cup First Division.

He joined the Leopards for the 2011 Currie Cup season.
