= Louis Strydom =

South African rugby union player

- Full name: Louis Isias Strydom
- Born: 21 October 1980 (age 46) Welkom
- Height: 1.77 m (5 ft 9 1/2 in)
- Weight: 80 kg (180 lb; 12 st 8 lb)
- School: Welkom THS

Rugby union career
- Position: Fly-half
- Current team: Griffons
Youth career
- 1999: Griffons
Senior career
Years	Team	Apps	(Points)
2001–2003	Griffons	26	(210)
2003–2004	Blue Bulls	23	(202)
2005–2006	Falcons	42	(422)
2007–2008	Lions	12	(62)
2007–2008	Golden Lions	26	(135)
2009–2011	Free State Cheetahs	44	(374)
2010–2011	Cheetahs	1	(2)
2011–2012	Eastern Province Kings	12	(108)
2013–present	Griffons	30	(231)
2001–present	Total	216	(1746)
- Correct as of 30 July 2015
International career
Years	Team	Apps	(Points)
2011	South African Kings	3	(45)
- Correct as of 17 October 2014

Louis Isias Strydom (born 21 October 1980) is a South African rugby union player, currently playing with the Griffons.

He was born in Welkom and started playing for the local Griffons team. His career saw him play for several different unions, representing the Blue Bulls, Falcons, Golden Lions, Free State Cheetahs and Eastern Province Kings. He also played some Super Rugby for the Lions and Cheetahs franchises.

He rejoined the Griffons in 2013. He was a key member of their 2014 Currie Cup First Division-winning side. He played in the final, kicking ten points to help the Griffons win the match 23–21 to win their first trophy for six years.
