= Hannes Franklin =

South African rugby union player

- Full name: Johannes Franklin
- Born: 6 October 1981 (age 45) Randfontein
- Height: 1.82 m (5 ft 11 1/2 in)
- Weight: 99 kg (218 lb; 15 st 8 lb)
- School: Bekker High School
- University: University of Potchefstroom

Rugby union career
- Position: Hooker
- Current team: Bourg-en-Bresse
Youth career
- 2002: Falcons
Senior career
Years	Team	Apps	(Points)
2003–2004	Falcons	22	(5)
2005	Pumas	18	(10)
2006–2008	SWD Eagles	58	(90)
2009–2010	Pumas	35	(50)
2010	Lions	12	(10)
2011–2013	Eastern Province Kings	53	(15)
2013	Southern Kings	10	(5)
2014	SWD Eagles	6	(0)
2014–present	Bourg-en-Bresse	15	(5)
- Correct as of 17 February 2015
International career
Years	Team	Apps	(Points)
2011	South African Kings	3	(0)
2012	South African Barbarians (South)	1	(5)
- Correct as of 21 February 2013

Johannes Franklin (born 6 October 1981) is a South African rugby union player, currently playing for Bourg-en-Bresse as a hooker.

He made his professional debut for the Falcons in 2003, then spent one season at the Pumas and three seasons at SWD Eagles before returning to the Pumas in 2009. During his second spell at the Pumas, he also represented the Royal XV in a game during the 2009 British & Irish Lions tour to South Africa. He was also included in the Lions Super Rugby squad in 2010.

He captained the Pumas side that beat the Eastern Province Kings in the 2010 Currie Cup promotion/relegation games, which kept the Pumas in the 2011 Currie Cup Premier Division, but he joined Eastern Province Kings for the 2011 Currie Cup First Division season. He was named in the Southern Kings squad for the 2013 Super Rugby season.
