= Mzwandile Stick =

South African rugby union player

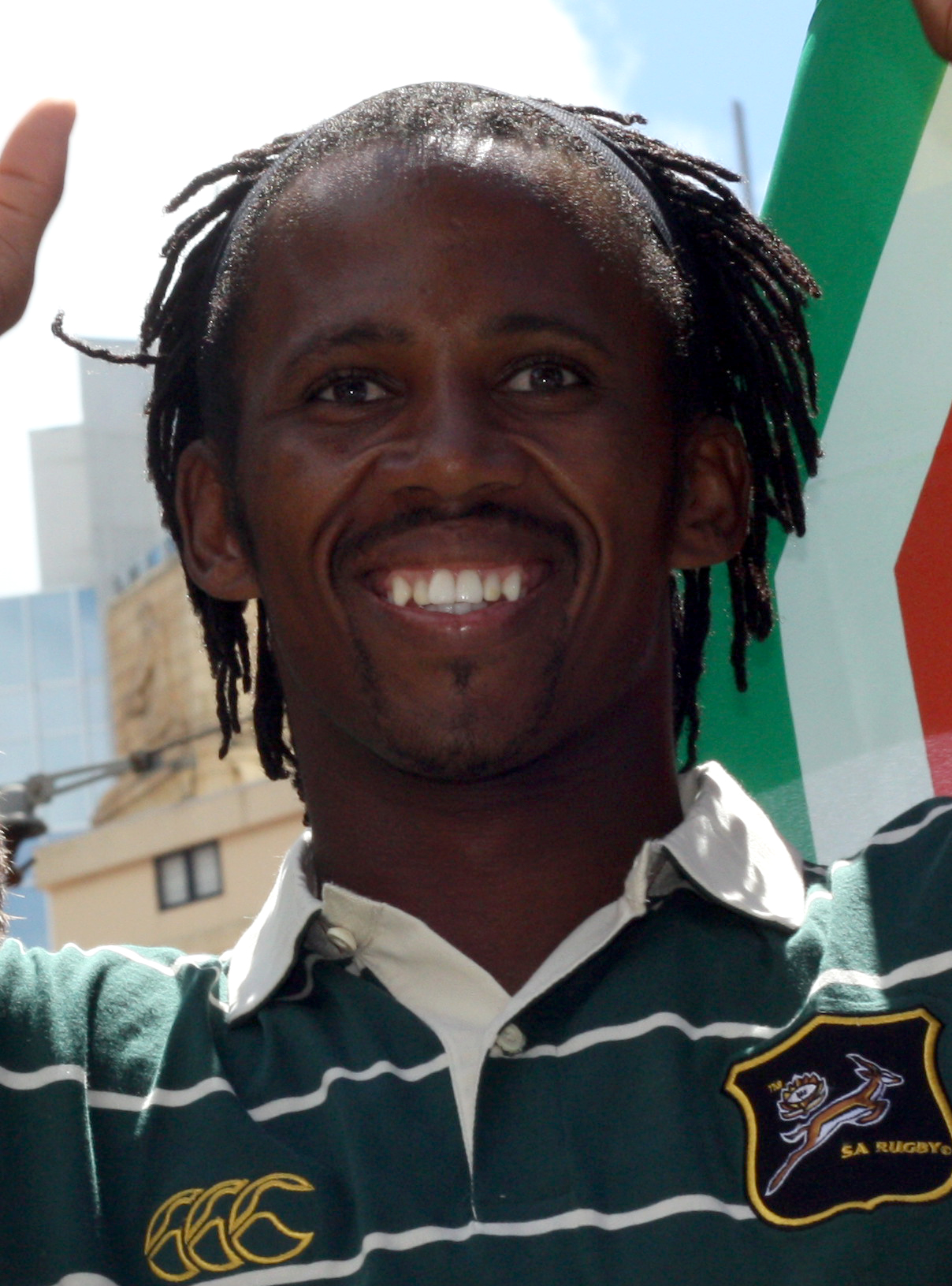
- Full name: Mzwandile Wanky Stick
- Born: 5 October 1984 (age 42) Port Elizabeth, South Africa
- Height: 1.81 m (5 ft 11 1/2 in)
- Weight: 87 kg (192 lb; 13 st 10 lb)
- School: Newell High School, Port Elizabeth

Rugby union career
- Position: Fullback
Youth career
- 2002–2003: Mighty Elephants
- 2004: Sharks
Senior career
Years	Team	Apps	(Points)
2003, 2007	Mighty Elephants	4	(0)
2004–2007	Sharks		
2010–2011	Eastern Province Kings	14	(14)
- Correct as of 25 July 2022
International career
Years	Team	Apps	(Points)
2005	South Africa Under-21		
- Correct as of 25 July 2022
National sevens team
Years	Team		Comps
2004–2009	South Africa 7s		
Coaching career
- Years: Team
- 2013: Eastern Province U21 (assistant)
- 2014–2015: Eastern Province Kings (Vodacom Cup head coach)
- 2014–2015: Eastern Province U19 (head coach)
- 2016: Southern Kings (assistant)
- 2016–present: South Africa (backs Coach)

Mzwandile Wanky Stick (born 5 October 1984 in Port Elizabeth) is a South African former rugby union footballer, and currently (since 2016) the backline coach for the South African national rugby union team.

== Playing career ==
He captained the South Africa sevens team during the 2008–09 IRB Sevens World Series, which saw the team win the series title for the first time. His favoured position was full-back. He came off the bench for a Southern Kings XV against British & Irish Lions during the 2009 tour to South Africa.

He was named in the Southern Kings wider training squad for the 2013 Super Rugby season, but was subsequently released to the Vodacom Cup squad.

== Coaching ==
He was named the Under-21 Assistant Coach in 2013. He became the head coach of the Eastern Province U19 team and their Vodacom Cup team for 2014 and 2015, guiding the Under-19s to their first ever Under-19 Provincial Championship title in 2015.

In December 2015, he was appointed as the backline coach of the Southern Kings team for the 2016 Super Rugby season, and joined the South Africa national rugby union team in the same capacity in April 2016.
