= Marcello Sampson =

South African rugby union player

- Full name: Marcello Edward Dennis Sampson
- Born: 27 March 1987 (age 39) Cape Town, South Africa
- Height: 1.83 m (6 ft 0 in)
- Weight: 85 kg (187 lb; 13 st 5 lb)
- School: Wynberg Boys' High School
- University: University of the Western Cape

Rugby union career
- Position: Wing
Youth career
- 2006–2008: Western Province
Amateur team(s)
| Years | Team | Apps | (Points) |
| 2008–2010 | UCT Ikey Tigers | 23 | (70) |
Senior career
| Years | Team | Apps | (Points) |
| 2009 | Western Province | 0 | (0) |
| 2011–2013 | Eastern Province Kings | 37 | (95) |
| 2013 | Southern Kings | 14 | (5) |
| 2014–2016 | Pumas | 23 | (35) |
| 2017 | Western Province | 6 | (25) |
- Correct as of 20 April 2018
International career
| Years | Team | Apps | (Points) |
| 2011 | South African Kings | 1 | (0) |
- Correct as of 20 April 2018

Marcello Edward Dennis Sampson (born 27 March 1987) is a South African professional rugby union player, who most recently played as a winger with Western Province.

== Career ==
=== Youth and Varsity Rugby ===
He started his career with Western Province in underage competitions, playing for them in the Under-19 Provincial Championship in 2006 and the Under-21 Provincial Championship in 2008 and 2009.

He also represented the UCT Ikey Tigers in the Varsity Cup competition in 2008, 2009 and 2010.

=== Western Province ===
He was named in the Western Province senior squad for the 2009 Vodacom Cup, but was never included in a matchday squad.

=== Eastern Province Kings ===
In 2011, he joined the Eastern Province Kings. He made his first class debut during the 2011 Vodacom Cup competition, starting in the Kings' 31–25 victory against the Leopards. He made six starts in total, scoring two tries.

His Currie Cup debut came in the EP Kings' opening day match in the 2011 Currie Cup First Division against SWD Eagles. He had his most prolific season in Kings colours, scoring nine tries in just seven starts, to finish joint fifth in the try scoring charts for the competition. This included a brace of tries in their Round Two match against the Border Bulldogs and a hat-trick in their very next match against the Griffons.

He made nineteen starts during 2012, weighing in with a further eight tries. In addition to playing Super Rugby for the Southern Kings in 2013, he made a further four appearances for the EP Kings in the 2013 Currie Cup First Division season. However, he announced towards the end of the season that he would be leaving the Port Elizabeth-based team.

==== 2013 Southern Kings Super Rugby season ====
In 2013, he was also named in the Southern Kings squad for the 2013 Super Rugby season. He started eleven of the Kings' games and came on off the bench in another two matches. However, he failed to score any tries during the regular season.

He got his first try in Southern Kings colours during the first leg of the 2013 Super Rugby promotion/relegation play-offs series against the Lions, which was ultimately not enough to help retain Super Rugby status for the Kings.

=== Pumas ===
He joined the Pumas for the 2014 season. He was a member of the Pumas side that won the Vodacom Cup for the first time in 2015, beating Western Province 24–7 in the final. Sampson made six appearances during the season, scoring three tries.
