= Jaco Engels =

Namibian rugby union player

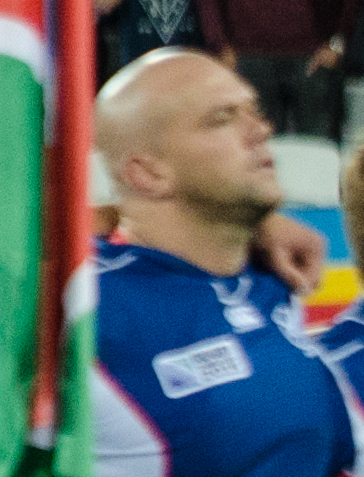
- Full name: Jaco Barny Engels
- Born: 17 December 1980 (age 45) Oranjemund, South West Africa
- Height: 1.86 m (6 ft 1 in)
- Weight: 118 kg (260 lb; 18 st 8 lb)
- School: Laerskool M.L. Fick, Hoër Volkskool, Potchefstroom
- University: PUK

Rugby union career
- Position: Prop
Youth career
- 1999–2002: Leopards
Senior career
Years	Team	Apps	(Points)
2003–2004	Leopards	40	(30)
2005	Boland Cavaliers	22	(20)
2006–2010	Bulls	40	(10)
2006–2010	Blue Bulls	67	(30)
2011–2013	Eastern Province Kings	34	(20)
2013	Southern Kings	4	(0)
2015	Welwitschias	6	(0)
- Correct as of 28 August 2015
International career
Years	Team	Apps	(Points)
2009	Southern Kings	1	(0)
2011	South African Kings	3	(5)
2013–2015	Namibia	15	(5)
- Correct as of 11 October 2015

Jaco Barny Engels (born 17 December 1980, in Oranjemund) is a Namibian rugby union player whose usual position is prop. As youngster while at primary school, Laerskool M.L. Fick, received Springbok / National Colours in Trampolining.

== Career ==
He has previously played for the Leopards, Boland Cavaliers and Blue Bulls in South Africa's Currie Cup. He has also played Super Rugby with the Bulls. He joined the Eastern Province Kings in 2011. He featured in both Currie Cup and Super Rugby winning squads while in Pretoria.

=== 2013 Southern Kings Super Rugby season ===
He was included in the Southern Kings squad for the 2013 Super Rugby season. He made appearances from the bench in each of the Kings' first four matches of the season, but SWD Eagles prop Grant Kemp was preferred to him for the remainder of the campaign. He made two appearances for the Eastern Province Kings 2013 Vodacom Cup campaign before linking up with Namibia for the 2013 Africa Cup.

=== International ===
He is eligible to play for Namibia, but did not play in the 2011 Rugby World Cup. He only made his debut for them aged 32, when he was included in a Namibian team to face a South Africa President's XV in 2013 and then represented Namibia in their 2013 Africa Cup Division 1B campaign.
