= Siyanda Grey =

South African rugby union player (born 1989)

- Born: 16 August 1989 (age 37) Komga, South Africa
- Height: 1.79 m (5 ft 10 1/2 in)
- Weight: 79 kg (174 lb; 12 st 6 lb)
- School: Hlumani Secondary School, Komga

Rugby union career
- Position: Centre
- Current team: Eastern Province Elephants
Youth career
- 2009–2010: Eastern Province Kings
Senior career
Years	Team	Apps	(Points)
2010–2018	Eastern Province Elephants	65	(115)
2013–2016	Southern Kings	5	(0)
- Correct as of 13 July 2018
International career
Years	Team	Apps	(Points)
2010	Emerging Boks (sevens)		
2011	South African Kings	3	(30)
- Correct as of 23 April 2018

Siyanda Grey (born 16 August 1989) is a South African professional rugby union player who last played for the Eastern Province Elephants in the Currie Cup and in the Rugby Challenge. His usual position is centre or wing.

== Career ==
=== Youth ===
Grey started his career in the youth system at the Eastern Province Kings, where he represented the Eastern Province U21 side in the 2009 and 2010 editions of the Under-21 Provincial Championship competition.

=== Eastern Province Kings ===
He was included in the Eastern Province Kings' 2010 Vodacom Cup squad, scoring on his debut against Western Province. He started three more Vodacom Cup that season, scoring another try. He returned to the Kings Vodacom Cup squad in 2011, scoring five tries in eight appearances.

He made his Currie Cup debut in the 2011 Currie Cup First Division, starting their match against the SWD Eagles. He scored a try in each of his next two matches, against the Border Bulldogs and the Griffons.

However, Grey then suffered a serious cruciate ligament which saw him miss the remainder of 2011 and the majority of the 2012 season. Upon his return from injury, he made five appearances towards the back-end of the 2012 Currie Cup First Division competition, scoring one try against the Griffons.

He was named in the Southern Kings squad for their inaugural season in the Super Rugby competition in 2013. Although not being included in the early stages of the competition – instead playing in the 2013 Vodacom Cup competition for the Kings, scoring three tries in six starts – he was called into the squad following injuries to Sergeal Petersen and Hadleigh Parkes and made four consecutive starts in the competition, against the Cheetahs, Waratahs, Highlanders and the return leg against the Cheetahs.

Grey returned to domestic action in the 2013 Currie Cup First Division, getting one try in his three appearances, but then suffered another long-term injury, with torn knee ligaments ruling him out of action until June 2014.

=== Representative rugby ===
In 2010, he was called up to an Emerging Springboks sevens team that played in the Safaricom Sevens tournament in Kenya.

The following year, Grey was included in the South African Kings team for the 2011 IRB Nations Cup. He was the leading try-scorer in the tournament, scoring six tries in three appearances, including a hat-trick against Georgia. Grey was also named as Player of the Tournament for his try-scoring exploits.

== Statistics ==
As of the end of the 2015 Vodacom Cup.

First class career
Season	Teams	Super Rugby		Currie Cup		Vodacom Cup		Other		Total	
Season	Teams	Apps	Pts	Apps	Pts	Apps	Pts	Apps	Pts	Apps	Pts
2010	Eastern Province Kings	—	—	—	—	4	10	—	—	4	10
2011	Southern Kings / Eastern Province Kings	—	—	4	10	8	25	3	30	15	65
2012	Eastern Province Kings	—	—	5	5	—	—	—	—	5	5
2013	Southern Kings / Eastern Province Kings	4	0	3	5	6	15	—	—	13	20
2014	Eastern Province Kings	—	—	3	5	—	—	—	—	3	5
2015	Eastern Province Kings	—	—	5	5	6	0	—	—	8	10
Total		4	0	20	30	24	50	3	30	51	110
