= Jacques Potgieter =

South African rugby union player

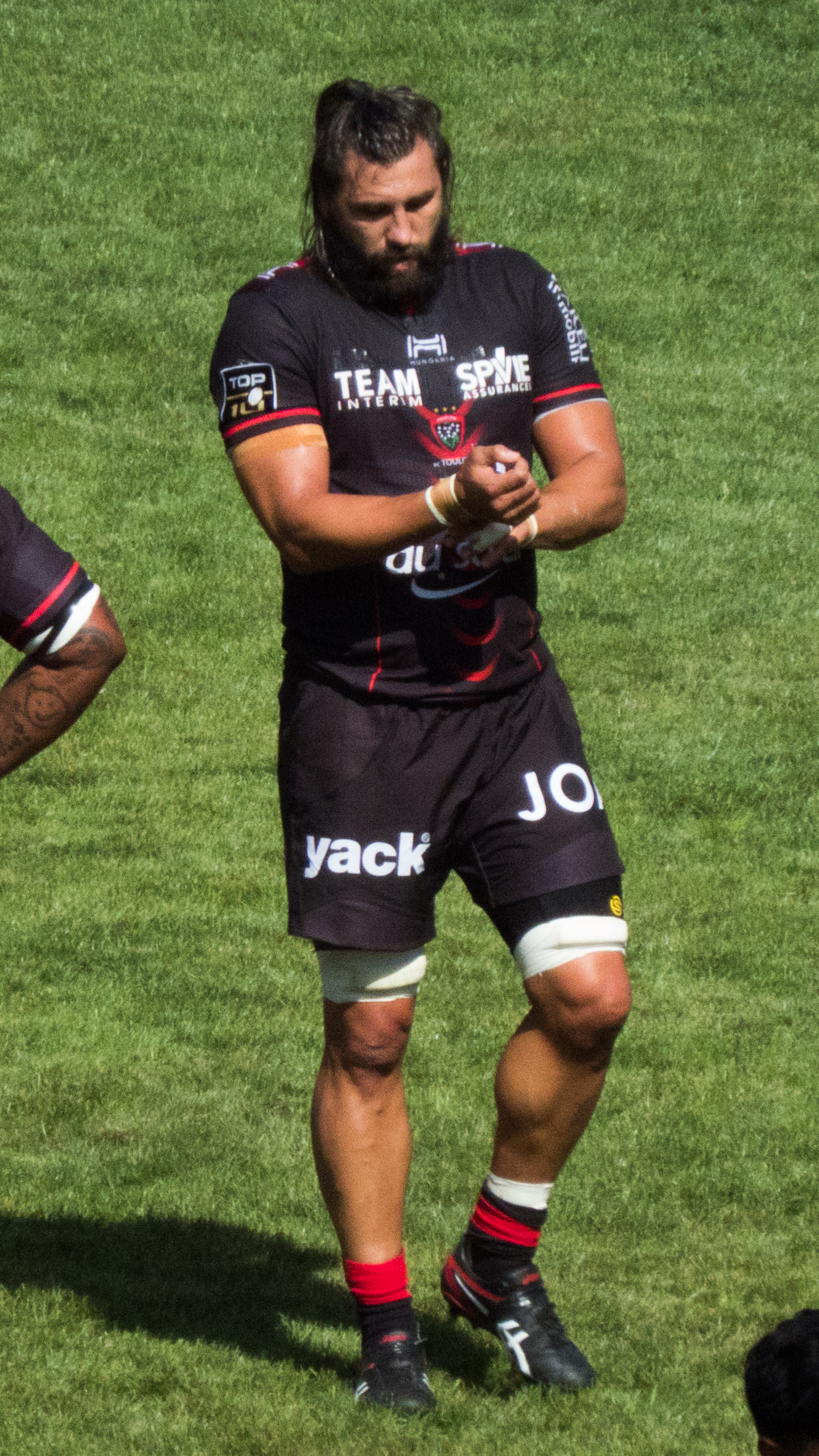
- Jacques Potgieter
- Full name: Ulrich Jacques Potgieter
- Born: 24 April 1986 (age 40) Port Elizabeth, South Africa
- Height: 1.94 m (6 ft 4 1/2 in)
- Weight: 115 kg (254 lb; 18 st 2 lb)
- School: HTS Daniel Pienaar, Uitenhage

Rugby union career
- Position: Flanker / Lock
Youth career
- 2004: Eastern Province Kings
- 2005–2007: Sharks
Senior career
Years	Team	Apps	(Points)
2008–2009	Sharks (Currie Cup)	2	(0)
2009–2011	Eastern Province Kings	36	(20)
2011–2013	Blue Bulls	9	(10)
2012–2013	Bulls	23	(20)
2014–2015	Waratahs	33	(15)
2014–2018	Munakata Sanix Blues	47	(5)
2016	Sharks	0	(0)
2016–2017	Bulls	5	(5)
2018–2019	Toulon	10	(0)
2021	Free State Cheetahs	5	(0)
- Correct as of 12 January 2022
International career
Years	Team	Apps	(Points)
2011	South African Kings	2	(5)
2012	South Africa	3	(0)
2015	Barbarians	1	(0)
- Correct as of 11 April 2018

Ulrich Jacques Potgieter (born 24 April 1986) is a South African rugby union player who last played for Munakata Sanix Blues in the Japanese Top League.

== Career ==
=== Youth / Sharks / Eastern Province Kings ===
He represented Eastern Province at the annual Craven Week rugby tournament in 2004 and then clinched a move to the Sharks, whom he represented at various youth levels before playing in the Vodacom Cup for two seasons before moving back to the Eastern Province Kings for the 2009 Currie Cup First Division season.

=== Blue Bulls / Bulls ===
In August 2011, the Blue Bulls announced that they had signed Potgieter for the 2012 season on a two-year contract. An early release of his contract was secured and he joined the Bulls on 1 September.

=== Fukuoka Sanix Blues / Waratahs ===
In May 2013, it was revealed that Potgieter would leave the Bulls at the end of the 2013 Super Rugby season. He joined Japanese Top League side Fukuoka Sanix Blues – a deal later extended until 2017 – and would also play Super Rugby for the Waratahs in 2014 and 2015.

=== Sharks ===
In May 2015, it was announced that Potgieter would return to South Africa to join the Sharks on a two-year deal for the start of the 2016 Super Rugby season. However, he did not make a single appearance for the side.

=== Return to the Bulls ===
An injury ruled Potgieter out for the start of the 2016 season and in May, the Bulls announced that he would return to Pretoria on a two-year deal with immediate effect.

=== South Africa ===
Potgieter became a Springbok on 23 June 2012 against England during a test played at Nelson Mandela Bay Stadium.
