= 2011 Currie Cup First Division =

Domestic rugby union competition

- Countries: South Africa
- Date: 15 July – 14 October 2011
- Champions: Boland Cavaliers (2nd title)
- Runners-up: Eastern Province Kings
- Promoted: None
- Matches played: 33
- Tries scored: 284 (average 8.6 per match)
- Top point scorer: Elgar Watts (175)
- Top try scorer: Danwel Demas (15)

The 2011 Currie Cup First Division was contested from 15 July to 14 October 2011. The tournament (known as the Absa Currie Cup First Division for sponsorship reasons) was the second tier of the 73rd season of the Currie Cup, an annual rugby union competition featuring the fourteen South African provincial unions.

The tournament was won by Boland Cavaliers, who beat the Eastern Province Kings 43–12 in the final played on 14 October 2011. No team was promoted to the top-tier Currie Cup Premier Division competition for 2012.

== Competition rules and information ==
There were six participating teams in the 2011 Currie Cup First Division. These teams played each other twice over the course of the season, once at home and once away.

Teams received four points for a win and two points for a draw. Bonus points were awarded to teams that score 4 or more tries in a game, as well as to teams that lost a match by seven points or less. Teams were ranked by points, then points difference (points scored less points conceded).

The top four teams qualified for the title play-offs. In the semi-finals, the team that finished first had home advantage against the team that finished fourth, while the team that finished second had home advantage against the team that finished third. The winners of these semi-finals played each other in the final, at the home venue of the higher-placed team.

Following the reduction of the Currie Cup Premier Division from eight teams to six teams for 2012, there was no promotion from the First Division in 2011.

== Teams ==
Location of South African teams in the 2011 Currie Cup First Division

The following teams took part in the 2011 Currie Cup First Division competition:

2011 Currie Cup First Division teams
| Team | Sponsored Name | Stadium/s | Sponsored Name |
| Boland Cavaliers | Regent Boland Cavaliers | Boland Stadium, Wellington | Boland Stadium |
| Border Bulldogs | Border Bulldogs | Buffalo City Stadium, East London | Buffalo City Stadium |
| Eastern Province Kings | Eastern Province Kings | Nelson Mandela Bay Stadium, Port Elizabeth | Nelson Mandela Bay Stadium |
| Falcons | Falcons | Barnard Stadium, Kempton Park | Barnard Stadium |
| Griffons | Tasol Solar Griffons | North West Stadium, Welkom | North West Stadium |
| SWD Eagles | SWD Eagles | Outeniqua Park, George | Outeniqua Park |

== Standings ==
The final league standings for the 2011 Currie Cup First Division were:

2011 Currie Cup First Division standings
| Pos | Team | Pld | W | D | L | PF | PA | PD | TF | TA | TB | LB | Pts | Qualification |
|---|---|---|---|---|---|---|---|---|---|---|---|---|---|---|
| 1 | Boland Cavaliers (C) | 10 | 9 | 0 | 1 | 473 | 187 | +286 | 62 | 24 | 9 | 1 | 46 | Promotion playoffs Semi-finals |
| 2 | Eastern Province Kings | 10 | 9 | 0 | 1 | 403 | 236 | +167 | 56 | 28 | 6 | 0 | 42 | Semi-finals |
| 3 | Falcons | 10 | 4 | 0 | 6 | 286 | 398 | −112 | 41 | 52 | 5 | 0 | 21 | Semi-finals |
| 4 | Griffons | 10 | 2 | 0 | 8 | 280 | 366 | −86 | 34 | 49 | 6 | 4 | 18 | Semi-finals |
| 5 | SWD Eagles | 10 | 3 | 0 | 7 | 298 | 396 | −98 | 37 | 49 | 3 | 1 | 16 | |
| 6 | Border Bulldogs | 10 | 3 | 0 | 7 | 256 | 413 | −157 | 29 | 57 | 3 | 1 | 16 | |

Rules for classification: 4 points for a win; 2 points for a draw; 1 bonus point for a loss by seven points or less; 1 bonus point for scoring four or more tries in a match
The top four teams qualify to the semi-finals: The first-placed team will host the fourth-placed team and the second-placed team will host the third-placed team. The higher-ranked semi-final winner will then host the lower-ranked semi-final winner in the final
(C) Champion

== Fixtures ==
- All times are South African (GMT+2).

=== Compulsory Friendlies ===
The following compulsory friendlies were played before the 2011 Currie Cup season between Premier Division and First Division teams:

| 23 June 2011 | Boland Cavaliers | 22–15 | Western Province | Boland Stadium, Wellington |
| 15:00 | Try: Johnathan Francke 39' m Chris Buckle 64' m Danwel Demas 73' m Junior Bester 76' c Con: Elgar Watts (1/3) 77' | Scoreboard | Try: Ederies Arendse 2' c JJ Engelbrecht 23' m Con: Isma-eel Dollie (1/2) 3'; Pen: Demetri Catrakilis (1/1) 67'; Cards: Yaasier Hartzenberg (yellow card) 35' to 45' | Referee: Jason Jaftha |

| 1 July 2011 | Falcons | 28–25 | Golden Lions | Barnard Stadium, Kempton Park |
| 18:00 | Try: Anrich Richter; Reg Muller; JW Bell; Con: Martin Thomsen (2/2); Pen: Martin Thomsen (2/2); Ulrich van Schalkwyk (1/1) | Scoreboard | Try: Nico Kruger; Uzair Cassiem; Robert de Bruyn; Con: Marais Schmidt (2/2); Pen: Marais Schmidt (2/2) | Referee: Pro Legoete |

| 8 July 2011 | Griffons | 19–50 | Blue Bulls | North West Stadium, Welkom |
| 18:30 | Try: Eddie Fredericks 55' c Con: Jannie Myburgh (1/1) 56'; Pen: Jannie Myburgh (4/6) 5', 16', 19', 26' | Scoreboard | Try: Stephan Dippenaar 21' c CJ Stander (2) 31' m, 46' c Stefan Watermeyer 51' c Jurgen Visser 63' m Henri Bantjes 73' c Con: Francois Brummer (3/5) 23', 46', 53'; Wesley Dunlop (1/1) 75'; Pen: Francois Brummer (4/4) 8', 11', 14', 38' | Attendance: 1,000; Referee: Lourens van der Merwe |

| 8 July 2011 | Border Bulldogs | 10–51 | Griquas | Buffalo City Stadium, East London |
| 19:00 | Try: Frans Laatz 53' c Con: Dale Sabbagh (1/1) 54'; Pen: Dale Sabbagh (1/2) 12' | Scoreboard | Try: Fabian Juries 7' m Davon Raubenheimer 20' c Justin Downey 27' c Jonathan Mokuena 39' c Jaco Nepgen 61' c Richard Lawson 63' m Rudi Vogt 75' c Con: Monty Dumond (3/4) 21', 28', 40'; Rudi Vogt (2/3) 61', 75'; Pen: Monty Dumond (2/2) 2', 45' | Attendance: 500; Referee: Sindile Mayende |

| 8 July 2011 | Eastern Province Kings | 20–26 | Free State Cheetahs | Nelson Mandela Bay Stadium, Port Elizabeth |
| 19:00 | Try: Mzwandile Stick 48' m Pen: Louis Strydom (5/6) 18', 21', 23', 32', 58' | Scoreboard | Try: Rayno Benjamin 62' c Riaan Smit 70' c Con: Riaan Smit (2/2) 63', 71'; Pen: Riaan Smit (3/3) 10', 30', 44'; Robbie van Schalkwyk (1/1) 79' | Attendance: 5,000; Referee: Pro Legoete |

| 8 July 2011 | SWD Eagles | 22–35 | Sharks | Outeniqua Park, George |
| 19:00 | Try: Kempie Rautenbach 8' m Wilhelm Koch 19' c Cecil Dumond 64' c Con: Cecil Dumond (1/2) 19'; Elric van Vuuren (1/1) 65'; Pen: Cecil Dumond (1/2) 2' | Scoreboard | Try: Dale Chadwick 14' c, 48' c Francois Kleinhans 40' c Gouws Prinsloo 56' c, 68' c Con: Jacques-Louis Potgieter (5/5) 15', 40', 48', 57', 69' | Attendance: 1,500; Referee: Jonathan Kaplan |

=== Regular season ===
The following matches were played in the 2011 Currie Cup First Division:

==== Round one ====
| 15 July 2011 | Eastern Province Kings | 28–20 | SWD Eagles | Nelson Mandela Bay Stadium, Port Elizabeth |
| 19:00 | Try: Norman Nelson 7'; Con: Louis Strydom 8' (1/1); Pen: Louis Strydom 28', 35', 38', 48' (4/5); George Whitehead 62', 69', 77' (3/4) | Report; Scoreboard | Try: Howard Noble 15'; Con: Cecil Dumond (0/1); Pen: Cecil Dumond 4', 10', 41' (3/4); Elric van Vuuren 57', 74' (2/2) | Attendance: 1,500; Referee: Mark Lawrence |

| 16 July 2011 | Falcons | 38–27 | Griffons | Barnard Stadium, Kempton Park |
| 15:00 | Try: Martin Thomsen 8'; Willie Odendaal 14'; Zane Kilian 39'; Kyle Hendricks 44'; Jacques George 51'; Sino Ganto 65'; Con: Martin Thomsen 40', 45', 52', 66' (4/6); Pen: Martin Thomsen (0/1) | Report; Scoreboard | Try: Gavin Annandale 17'; Eddie Fredericks 60'; Willie Britz 69', 73'; Con: Jannie Myburgh 18' (1/1); Tiaan van Wyk 74' (1/3); Pen: Jannie Myburgh 22' (1/1) | Referee: Tiaan Jonker |

| 16 July 2011 | Boland Cavaliers | 69–12 | Border Bulldogs | Boland Stadium, Wellington |
| 16:00 | Try: Bolla Conradie 6'; Clemen Lewis 8'; Danwel Demas 17' penalty try 31'; Willie le Roux 45', 73'; Cornal Hendricks 53'; Brendon April 71', 76'; Con: Elgar Watts 7', 9', 18', 32', 46', 54', 72', 74', 77' (9/9); Pen: Elgar Watts 10', 50' (2/2) | Report; Scoreboard | Try: Ntabeni Dukisa 27'; Roy Bursey 39'; Con: Dale Sabbagh 28' (1/1); Ntabeni Dukisa (0/1); Pen: Dale Sabbagh (0/3) | Referee: Quinton Immelman |

==== Round two ====
| 22 July 2011 | Griffons | 7–46 | Boland Cavaliers | North West Stadium, Welkom |
| 15:00 | Try: Werner Griesel 72'; Con: Jannie Myburgh 73' (1/1); Pen: Jannie Myburgh (0/1) | Report; Scoreboard | Try: Willie le Roux 3'; Bolla Conradie 36'; Junior Bester 43'; Brendon April 64', 71'; Cornal Hendricks 80'; Con: Elgar Watts 4', 37', 65' (3/4); Willie le Roux 72', 81' (2/2); Pen: Elgar Watts 28', 34' (2/3) | Attendance: 300; Referee: Lourens van der Merwe |

| 22 July 2011 | Border Bulldogs | 15–62 | Eastern Province Kings | Buffalo City Stadium, East London |
| 19:00 | Try: Byron McGuigan 35', 78'; Con: Dale Sabbagh 36' (1/2); Pen: Dale Sabbagh 6' (1/1); Cards: Samora Fihlani (yellow card) 53' to 63' | Report; Scoreboard | Try: Jaco Bekker 4'; Norman Nelson 12'; Barend Pieterse 17'; Siyanda Grey 20'; Marcello Sampson 22', 61'; George Whitehead 43'; Darron Nell 46'; Frank Herne 54'; SP Marais 74'; Con: George Whitehead 5', 13', 23', 47', 55', 75' (6/10); Pen: George Whitehead (0/1) | Attendance: 2,800; Referee: Sandile Mayende |

Bye/s: Falcons, SWD Eagles

==== Round three ====
| 29 July 2011 | Boland Cavaliers | 52–10 | Falcons | Boland Stadium, Wellington |
| 15:00 | Try: Cornal Hendricks 10', 52'; Elgar Watts 27'; Danwel Demas 63'; Johnathan Francke 66'; Willie le Roux 72'; Brendon April 81'; Con: Elgar Watts (0/1); Willie le Roux 64', 67', 73', 82' (4/6); Pen: Elgar Watts 2' (1/1); Willie le Roux 47', 49' (2/2) | Report; Scoreboard | Try: Kyle Hendricks 77'; Con: Chanley Williams 78' (1/1); Pen: Chanley Williams 20' (1/2) | Attendance: 1,000; Referee: Joey Salmans |

| 29 July 2011 | Eastern Province Kings | 67–26 | Griffons | Nelson Mandela Bay Stadium, Port Elizabeth |
| 19:00 | Try: SP Marais 6'; Jaco Bekker 10', 16'; Marcello Sampson 22', 28', 66'; Falie Oelschig 32'; Norman Nelson 41', 73'; Luke Watson 52'; Siyanda Grey 62'; Con: George Whitehead 11', 17', 29', 42', 67', 74' (6/11) | Report; Scoreboard | Try: Ricardo Pietersen 38'; Nicky Steyn 46'; Enrico Schultz 55'; Tertius Maarman 77'; Con: Jannie Myburgh 39' (1/2); Tiaan van Wyk 56', 78' (2/2); Pen: Jannie Myburgh (0/1) | Attendance: 3,400; Referee: Pro Legoete |

| 29 July 2011 | SWD Eagles | 46–35 | Border Bulldogs | Outeniqua Park, George |
| 19:00 | Try: Howard Noble 3', 60'; Jeff Taljard 35'; Lyndon Hartnick 43'; Eric Coetzee 47'; Martin Ferreira 70'; Con: Elric van Vuuren 4', 44', 48', 61', 71' (5/6); Pen: Elric van Vuuren 16', 22' (2/2) | Report; Scoreboard | Try: Chumani Booi 45'; Matthew Taljard 64'; Ben Venter 72'; Vuyo Mbotho 77'; Con: Dale Sabbagh 45', 73', 78' (3/4); Pen: Dale Sabbagh 10', 14', 38' (3/3); Byron McGuigan (0/1); Cards: Ben Venter (yellow card) 43' to 53' | Attendance: 200; Referee: Lourens van der Merwe |

==== Round four ====
| 5 August 2011 | Falcons | 20–36 | Eastern Province Kings | Barnard Stadium, Kempton Park |
| 15:00 | Try: Coert Cronjé 49'; Kyle Hendricks 52', 76'; Con: Dillon Laubscher 53' (1/2); Chanley Williams (0/1); Pen: Dillon Laubscher 9' (1/1) | Report; Scoreboard | Try: SP Marais 12', 23', 46'; Norman Nelson 31'; Matthew Tayler-Smith 55', 80'; Con: George Whitehead 13', 47' (2/4); Louis Strydom 80' (1/2) | Attendance: 500; Referee: Andrew Lees |

| 6 August 2011 | Griffons | 45–48 | SWD Eagles | North West Stadium, Welkom |
| 15:00 | Try: Werner Griesel 36'; Tiaan van Wyk 58', 67'; Nicky Steyn 62'; Thabang Molefe 77'; Shaun Raubenheimer 81'; Con: Tiaan van Wyk 59', 78', 82' (3/6); Pen: Tiaan van Wyk 12', 26', 40' (3/3) | Report; Scoreboard | Try: Elric van Vuuren 19', 28'; Hein Potgieter 34'; Howard Noble 45', 54'; Baldwin McBean 50', 65'; Con: Elric van Vuuren 29', 35', 46', 51', 55' (5/7); Pen: Elric van Vuuren 79' (1/2); Cards: Kempie Rautenbach (yellow card) 54' to 64' | Attendance: 1,000; Referee: Jason Jaftha |

Bye/s: Boland Cavaliers, Border Bulldogs

==== Round Five ====
| 12 August 2011 | Border Bulldogs | 26–21 | Griffons | Buffalo City Stadium, East London |
| 19:00 | Try: Shane Spring 14'; Luvuyo Mhlobiso 20'; Chumani Booi 36'; Con: Dale Sabbagh 15' (1/3); Pen: Dale Sabbagh 4' (1/2); Ntabeni Dukisa 17', 60' (2/2); Cards: Renier Schoeman (yellow card) 77' | Report; Scoreboard | Try: Martin Sithole 65'; Nicky Steyn 79'; Con: Tiaan van Wyk 66' (1/2); Pen: Tiaan van Wyk 6', 19', 35' (3/3) | Attendance: 500; Referee: Tiaan Jonker |

| 12 August 2011 | Eastern Province Kings | 23–17 | Boland Cavaliers | Nelson Mandela Bay Stadium, Port Elizabeth |
| 19:00 | Try: Luke Watson 5'; Clint Newland 32'; Con: Louis Strydom 6', 33' (2/2); Pen: Louis Strydom 12', 19' (2/4); Drop: Louis Strydom 67' (1/1) | Report; Scoreboard | Try: Cornal Hendricks 2'; Con: Elgar Watts (0/1); Pen: Elgar Watts 27', 36', 59', 69' (4/4) | Attendance: 4,000; Referee: Quinton Immelman |

| 12 August 2011 | SWD Eagles | 24–15 | Falcons | Outeniqua Park, George |
| 19:00 | Try: Giant Mtyanda 5'; Martin Ferreira 16'; Jeff Taljard 22'; Con: Elric van Vuuren 6', 17', 23' (3/3); Pen: Elric van Vuuren 53' (1/1); Cards: Anton Beswick (yellow card) 45' to 55' | Report; Scoreboard | Try: Johan de Bruin 51'; Warren Perkins 74'; Con: Chanley Williams 52' (1/2); Pen: Kyle Hendricks 12' (1/3); Cards: Bradley Fortuin (yellow card) 79' | Referee: Pro Legoete |

==== Round Six ====
| 19 August 2011 | Boland Cavaliers | 49–24 | SWD Eagles | Boland Stadium, Wellington |
| 16:00 | Try: Junior Bester 16', 36', 68'; Cornal Hendricks 21'; Zandré Jordaan 29'; Willie le Roux 39', 78'; Bolla Conradie 50'; Con: Elgar Watts 17', 22', 40' (3/6); Willie le Roux (0/2); Pen: Elgar Watts 2' (1/2) | Report Scoreboard | Try: Howard Noble 14'; Jeff Taljard 43', 52'; Con: Elric van Vuuren 15', 44', 53' (3/3); Pen: Elric van Vuuren 4' (1/1) | Referee: Jaco Peyper |

| 19 August 2011 | Falcons | 57–42 | Border Bulldogs | Barnard Stadium, Kempton Park |
| 17:00 | Try: Coert Cronjé 2'; JW Bell 8'; Reg Muller 11', 17', 75'; Zander de Kock 30'; Kyle Hendricks 33'; Chanley Williams 48'; Martin Thomsen 79'; Con: Kyle Hendricks 3' (1/4); Chanley Williams 31', 34', 49' (3/3); Martin Thomsen 76', 80' (2/2) | Report; Scoreboard | Try: Shane Spring 22'; Vuyo Mbotho 36'; Byron McGuigan 41'; Ntabeni Dukisa 50'; Con: Ntabeni Dukisa 42', 51' (2/4); Pen: Ntabeni Dukisa 10', 27', 32', 55', 62', 67' (6/9) | Attendance: 3,500; Referee: Stuart Berry |

Bye/s: Eastern Province Kings, Griffons

==== Round Seven ====
| 26 August 2011 | SWD Eagles | 24–60 | Eastern Province Kings | Outeniqua Park, George |
| 17:05 | Try: Elric van Vuuren 14'; Howard Noble 47'; Connie Botha 60'; Con: Elric van Vuuren 15', 48', 61' (3/3); Pen: Elric van Vuuren 9' (1/2) | Report; Scoreboard | Try: SP Marais 25', 40', 45', 72'; Matthew Tayler-Smith 36'; Norman Nelson 42', 63'; Frank Herne 67'; Luke Watson 80'; Con: Louis Strydom 26', 37', 43', 46' (4/6); SP Marais 68', 73' (2/3); Pen: Louis Strydom 7' (1/2) | Attendance: 500; Referee: Marius Jonker |

| 26 August 2011 | Border Bulldogs | 15–36 | Boland Cavaliers | Buffalo City Stadium, East London |
| 19:00 | Try: Samora Fihlani 32'; Ntabeni Dukisa 43'; Con: Ntabeni Dukisa 44' (1/2); Pen: Ntabeni Dukisa 49' (1/1); Cards: Sino Nyoka (yellow card) 65' to 75' | Report; Scoreboard | Try: Willie le Roux 2'; Brendon April 4', 60'; Ashton Constant 11'; Danwel Demas 39'; PJ Vermeulen 77'; Con: Elgar Watts 3', 61', 78' (3/6); Cards: Johnathan Francke (yellow card) 37' to 47'; Cornal Hendricks (yellow card) 73' | Attendance: 750; Referee: Lourens van der Merwe |

| 27 August 2011 | Griffons | 46–21 | Falcons | North West Stadium, Welkom |
| 17:00 | Try: Tertius Maarman 9', 79'; Jaco Meyer 14'; Philip van der Walt 23'; Ricardo Pietersen 45'; Con: Tiaan van Wyk 24', 46', 80' (3/5); Pen: Tiaan van Wyk 33', 36', 42', 69' (4/4); Drop: Tiaan van Wyk 7' (1/2); Cards: Sarel Louw (yellow card) 28' to 38' | Report; Scoreboard | Try: Coert Cronjé 29'; Sino Ganto 58'; Kyle Hendricks 62'; Con: Martin Thomsen 30' (1/1); Kyle Hendricks 59', 63' (2/2); Pen: Chanley Williams (0/1) | Attendance: 300; Referee: Pro Legoete |

==== Round Eight ====
| 2 September 2011 | Eastern Province Kings | 51–36 | Border Bulldogs | Nelson Mandela Bay Stadium, Port Elizabeth |
| 19:00 | Try: Luke Watson 22', 32'; Marcello Sampson 36'; Louis Strydom 39'; Danie Faasen 43'; Norman Nelson 71'; Jaco Engels 74'; Con: Louis Strydom 23', 37', 40' (3/5); George Whitehead 72', 75' (2/2); Pen: George Whitehead 64', 68' (2/2) | Report; Scoreboard | Try: Vuyo Mbotho 12', 26'; Lubabalo Mzwakali 56', 78'; Chumani Booi 60'; Con: Ntabeni Dukisa 27' (1/2); Dale Sabbagh 57', 61', 79' (3/3); Pen: Ntabeni Dukisa (0/1); Dale Sabbagh 47' (1/1); Cards: Onke Dubase (yellow card) 31' to 41' | Attendance: 1,200; Referee: Jaco Peyper |

| 3 September 2011 | Boland Cavaliers | 47–29 | Griffons | Boland Stadium, Wellington |
| 16:00 | Try: Ligtoring Landman 2', 8'; PJ Vermeulen 24'; Cornal Hendricks 30'; Elgar Watts 81'; Con: Elgar Watts 3', 9', 25', 31', 82' (5/5); Pen: Elgar Watts 21', 37', 61', 78' (4/4) | Report; Scoreboard | Try: Burger Schoeman 10', 55'; Nicky Steyn 34'; Japie Nel 72'; Con: Tiaan van Wyk 11' (1/1); Reinhardt Erwee 35', 56' (2/3); Pen: Tiaan van Wyk (0/1); Reinhardt Erwee 40' (1/2) | Attendance: 800; Referee: Joey Salmans |

Bye/s: Falcons, SWD Eagles

==== Round Nine ====
| 9 September 2011 | Border Bulldogs | 19–16 | SWD Eagles | Buffalo City Stadium, East London |
| 17:05 | Try: Ntabeni Dukisa 14'; Con: Ntabeni Dukisa 15' (1/1); Pen: Ntabeni Dukisa 4', 12', 31' (3/4); Drop: Dale Sabbagh 59' (1/1); Cards: Thembani Mkokeli (yellow card) 72' | Report; Scoreboard | Try: Martin Ferreira 74'; Con: Elric van Vuuren 75' (1/1); Pen: Elric van Vuuren 10', 20', 29' (3/5) | Attendance: 750; Referee: Rasta Rasivhenge |

| 10 September 2011 | Falcons | 28–55 | Boland Cavaliers | Barnard Stadium, Kempton Park |
| 15:00 | Try: Warren Perkins 13'; Anrich Richter 28', 47'; Chris Ehlers 77'; Con: Jaun Kotzé 14', 29', 48', 78' (4/4); Pen: Arno Poley (0/1); Jaun Kotzé (0/1); Drop: Arno Poley (0/2); Cards: Pieter Lubbe (yellow card) 70' to 80' | Report; Scoreboard | Try: Danwel Demas 3'; Cornal Hendricks 26', 63'; Willie le Roux 60', 67'; Junior Bester 79'; Ligtoring Landman 82'; Con: Elgar Watts 27', 64', 68', 80' (4/7); Pen: Elgar Watts 18', 21', 34', 53' (4/4); Cards: Ligtoring Landman (yellow card) 27' to 37' | Attendance: 300; Referee: Stuart Berry |

| 10 September 2011 | Griffons | 19–21 | Eastern Province Kings | North West Stadium, Welkom |
| 15:00 | Try: Willie Britz 34'; Con: Tiaan van Wyk 35' (1/1); Pen: Tiaan van Wyk 9', 14', 20' (3/6); Drop: Tiaan van Wyk 42' (1/1); Cards: Japie Nel (yellow card) 71' | Report; Scoreboard | Try: Marcello Sampson 3'; Joe Breytenbach 73'; Con: Louis Strydom 74' (1/2); Pen: Louis Strydom 22', 27', 61' (3/5) | Attendance: 1,500; Referee: Pro Legoete |

==== Round Ten ====
| 16 September 2011 | Eastern Province Kings | 40–10 | Falcons | Nelson Mandela Bay Stadium, Port Elizabeth |
| 19:00 | Try: Luke Watson 10'; Ross Kennedy 20'; Jacques Coetzee 33'; Marcello Sampson 43', 53'; Bobby Dyer 76'; Con: Louis Strydom 11', 21', 34', 54' (4/5); George Whitehead 76' (1/1) | Report; Scoreboard | Try: Bovril de Bruin 46'; Con: Jaun Kotzé 46' (1/1); Pen: Jaun Kotzé 16' (1/1); Cards: Zane Kilian (yellow card) 30' to 41' | Referee: Joey Salmans |

| 16 September 2011 | SWD Eagles | 27–39 | Griffons | Outeniqua Park, George |
| 19:00 | Try: Dumisani Meslane 4'; Jeff Taljard 8'; Howard Noble 72'; Con: Elric van Vuuren 5', 9', 73' (3/3); Pen: Elric van Vuuren 15', 22' (2/2) | Report; Scoreboard | Try: Nicky Steyn 18', 68'; Japie Nel 36', 47'; Con: Tiaan van Wyk 19', 37' (2/4); Pen: Tiaan van Wyk 1', 23', 26', 55' (4/7); Valentine van Wyk 77' (1/1) | Attendance: 200; Referee: Lourens van der Merwe |

Bye/s: Boland Cavaliers, Border Bulldogs

==== Round Eleven ====
| 23 September 2011 | Boland Cavaliers | 49–15 | Eastern Province Kings | Boland Stadium, Wellington |
| 15:00 | Try: Danwel Demas 39', 63', 71', 77'; Bolla Conradie 68'; Willie le Roux 75'; Con: Elgar Watts 40' (1/2); Willie le Roux 69', 72', 76', 78' (4/4); Pen: Elgar Watts 9', 22', 47' (3/6); Drop: Bolla Conradie (0/1); Cards: Clemen Lewis (yellow card) 48' to 58' | Report; Scoreboard | Try: Jaco Engels 12'; Luke Watson 49'; Con: SP Marais 13' (1/1); Louis Strydom (0/1); Pen: SP Marais 20' (1/2); Louis Strydom (0/1); Cards: Clint Newland (yellow card) 35' to 45'; Devin Oosthuizen (yellow card) 46' to 58'; Jacques Engelbrecht (yellow card) 66' to 76' | Attendance: 2,000; Referee: Marius Jonker |

| 24 September 2011 | Falcons | 53–45 | SWD Eagles | Barnard Stadium, Kempton Park |
| 15:00 | Try: Franco Booysen 13', 35'; Reg Muller 16', 54'; Zander de Kock 38'; Jaco Snyman 42'; Kyle Hendricks 71'; Con: Jaun Kotzé 14', 17', 36', 39', 55', 71' (6/7); Pen: Jaun Kotzé 4' (1/1); Drop: Jaun Kotzé 56' (1/1); Cards: JW Bell (yellow card) 77' | Report; Scoreboard | Try: Wilhelm Koch 22'; Layle Delo 46'; Braam Immelman 50'; Giant Mtyanda 62'; Duwayne Smart 69'; Wentsley Scott 74'; Eric Coetzee 80'; Con: Elric van Vuuren 23', 51', 63', 70', 81' (5/7) | Attendance: 500; Referee: Quinton Immelman |

| 24 September 2011 | Griffons | 21–25 | Border Bulldogs | North West Stadium, Welkom |
| 15:00 | Try: Shaun Raubenheimer 20'; Japie Nel 52'; Tertius Maarman 65'; Con: Tiaan van Wyk 21', 53', 66' (3/3) | Report; Scoreboard | Try: Ntabeni Dukisa 31'; Onke Dubase 33'; Shane Spring 57'; Con: Ntabeni Dukisa 32', 58' (2/3); Pen: Ntabeni Dukisa 5', 40' (2/4) | Attendance: 150; Referee: Joey Salmans |

==== Round Twelve ====
| 30 September 2011 | SWD Eagles | 24–53 | Boland Cavaliers | Outeniqua Park, George |
| 17:05 | Try: Wilhelm Koch 8'; Braam Immelman 22'; Mzo Dyantyi 65'; Con: Elric van Vuuren 9', 22' (2/2); Deroy Rhoode 65' (1/1); Pen: Deroy Rhoode 39' (1/2) | Report; Scoreboard | Try: Willie le Roux 17', 31'; Ashton Constant 25'; Zandré Jordaan 52'; Elgar Watts 59'; Danwel Demas 75'; Bolla Conradie 78'; Con: Elgar Watts 17', 32', 53', 60', 76', 79' (6/7); Pen: Elgar Watts 14', 67' (2/2) | Referee: Rasta Rasivhenge |

| 30 September 2011 | Border Bulldogs | 31–34 | Falcons | Buffalo City Stadium, East London |
| 19:00 | Try: Ntabeni Dukisa 8'; Vuyo Mbotho 17'; Shane Spring 43'; Con: Ntabeni Dukisa 9' (1/2); Dale Sabbagh 44' (1/1); Pen: Ntabeni Dukisa 13', 23' (2/3); Dale Sabbagh 32', 68' (2/2); Cards: Lubabalo Mzwakali (yellow card) 49' to 60' | Report; Scoreboard | Try: Marco Kotze 36'; Jaco Snyman 50', 73'; Clinton Kayser 53'; Kyle Hendricks 76'; Con: Jaun Kotzé 37', 51', 54' (3/5); Pen: Jaun Kotzé 3' (1/1) | Referee: Jason Jaftha |

Bye/s: Eastern Province Kings, Griffons

=== Title Play-Off Games ===
==== Semi-finals ====
| 7 October 2011 | Boland Cavaliers | 50–20 | Griffons | Boland Stadium, Wellington |
| 16:00 | Try: Danwel Demas 3', 34', 45', 75'; Elgar Watts 20'; Thor Halvorsen 60'; Cornal Hendricks 80'; Con: Elgar Watts 4', 21', 35', 46', 61', 81' (6/7); Pen: Elgar Watts 33' (1/1); Cards: Zandré Jordaan (yellow card) 50' to 61' | Report; Scoreboard | Try: Nicky Steyn 27'; Japie Nel 38'; Andries Mahoney 71'; Con: Tiaan van Wyk (0/2); Reinhardt Erwee 72' (1/1); Pen: Tiaan van Wyk 23' (1/3) | Attendance: 2,000; Referee: Jason Jaftha |

| 7 October 2011 | Eastern Province Kings | 48–17 | Falcons | Nelson Mandela Bay Stadium, Port Elizabeth |
| 18:30 | Try: Bobby Dyer 13'; Jacques Engelbrecht 24'; Norman Nelson 29'; Devin Oosthuizen 46'; SP Marais 53'; Jaco Bekker 75'; Con: Louis Strydom 14', 25', 30', 47', 54' (5/5); George Whitehead 76' (1/1); Pen: Louis Strydom 23', 38' (2/2); Cards: Joe Breytenbach (yellow card) 65' to 76' | Report; Scoreboard | Try: Coert Cronjé 68'; Kyle Hendricks 79'; Con: Jaun Kotzé 69', 80' (2/2); Pen: Jaun Kotzé 21' (1/1); Cards: Heinrich Rademeyer (yellow card) 56' to 66'; Warren Perkins (yellow card) 61' to 71' | Attendance: 2,400; Referee: Pro Legoete |

==== Final ====
| 14 October 2011 | Boland Cavaliers | 43–12 | Eastern Province Kings | Boland Stadium, Wellington |
| 16:00 | Try: Clemen Lewis 38'; Ligtoring Landman 48'; Brendon April 57'; Danwel Demas 73', 75'; Zandré Jordaan 77'; Con: Elgar Watts 39', 49' (2/5); Willie le Roux (0/1); Pen: Elgar Watts 4', 30', 47' (3/4); Cards: Zandré Jordaan (yellow card) 20' to 30' | Report; Scoreboard | Try: Andile Witbooi 9'; Bobby Dyer 81'; Con: Louis Strydom 10' (1/1); George Whitehead (0/1); Pen: Louis Strydom (0/1); Cards: Jaco Bekker (yellow card) 39' to 49'; Bobby Dyer (yellow card) 57' to 67' | Attendance: 5,000; Referee: Lourens van der Merwe |

2011 Absa Currie Cup
First Division Champions

Boland Cavaliers
2nd title

== Top scorers ==
The following sections contain only points and tries which have been scored in competitive games in the 2011 Currie Cup First Division.

=== Top points scorers ===
| Rank | Player | Team | Points |
|---|---|---|---|
| 1 | Elgar Watts | Boland Cavaliers | 175 |
| 2 | Elric van Vuuren | SWD Eagles | 119 |
| 3 | Tiaan van Wyk | Griffons | 104 |
| 4 | Willie le Roux | Boland Cavaliers | 95 |
| 5 | Ntabeni Dukisa | Border Bulldogs | 94 |
| 6 | Louis Strydom | Eastern Province Kings | 88 |
| 7 | Danwel Demas | Boland Cavaliers | 75 |
| 8 | George Whitehead | Eastern Province Kings | 61 |
| 9 | SP Marais | Eastern Province Kings | 54 |
| 9 | Kyle Hendricks | Falcons | 54 |

Source: South African Rugby Union

=== Top try scorers ===
| Rank | Player | Team | Tries |
|---|---|---|---|
| 1 | Danwel Demas | Boland Cavaliers | 15 |
| 2 | Willie le Roux | Boland Cavaliers | 12 |
| 3 | Cornal Hendricks | Boland Cavaliers | 10 |
| 3 | SP Marais | Eastern Province Kings | 10 |
| 5 | Kyle Hendricks | Falcons | 9 |
| 5 | Norman Nelson | Eastern Province Kings | 9 |
| 5 | Marcello Sampson | Eastern Province Kings | 9 |
| 7 | Brendon April | Boland Cavaliers | 8 |
| 7 | Howard Noble | SWD Eagles | 8 |
| 9 | Nicky Steyn | Griffons | 7 |
| 9 | Luke Watson | Eastern Province Kings | 7 |

Source: South African Rugby Union

== See also ==
- 2011 Currie Cup Premier Division
- 2011 Vodacom Cup
- 2011 Under-21 Provincial Championship
- 2011 Under-19 Provincial Championship
