= 2012 7s Premier League =

- Host nation: South Africa
- Date: 14–15 December 2012

Cup
- Champion: Samurai Sevens
- Runner-up: Cheetahs

Plate
- Winner: Living Ball
- Runner-up: Blue Bulls

Bowl
- Winner: Lions
- Runner-up: Western Province

Shield
- Winner: No Shield competition
- Runner-up: No Shield competition

The 2012 7s Premier League (also known as the NBM 7s Premier League for sponsorship reasons) was the first edition of the 7s Premier League tournament and was held at Outeniqua Park, George on 14 and 15 December 2012.

== Format ==
The teams will be divided into four pools of three teams. On Day 1, each team in Pool A and Pool B will play cross-conference games against the three teams in the other pool. Similarly, each team in Pool C and Pool D will play cross-conference games against the three teams in the other pool.

The top two teams in each pool will qualify for the Cup Quarter-finals and the bottom team in each pool will qualify for the Bowl Semi-Finals. The winners of the Cup Quarter-finals will advance to the Cup Semi-Finals, while the losers of the quarter-finals will advance to the Plate Semi-Finals. In the Cup, Plate and Bowl Semi-Finals, the winners will advance to the Final, while the losers will advance to the 3rd-place play-off.

== Pools ==
=== Pool A ===
==== Log ====
2012 7s Premier League Pool A Log
Position	Team	Played	Won	Drawn	Lost	Points For	Points Against	Points Difference	Points
1	NBM All-Stars	3	3	0	0	64	39	+25	9
2	Blue Bulls	3	2	0	1	103	59	+44	7
3	Vikings	3	0	0	3	38	94	–56	3
The top 2 teams will qualify for the Cup Quarter-finals. Points breakdown: *3 points for a win *2 points for a draw *1 point for a loss

=== Pool B ===
==== Log ====
2012 7s Premier League Pool B Log
Position	Team	Played	Won	Drawn	Lost	Points For	Points Against	Points Difference	Points
1	Cheetahs	3	2	0	1	71	38	+33	7
2	Boland Cavaliers	3	1	0	2	68	89	–21	5
3	Mighty Mohicans	3	1	0	2	53	78	–25	5
The top 2 teams will qualify for the Cup Quarter-finals. Points breakdown: *3 points for a win *2 points for a draw *1 point for a loss

=== Pool C ===
==== Log ====
2012 7s Premier League Pool C Log
Position	Team	Played	Won	Drawn	Lost	Points For	Points Against	Points Difference	Points
1	Samurai Sevens	3	3	0	0	69	36	+33	9
2	Kaizer Chiefs	3	2	0	1	79	61	+18	7
3	Western Province	3	0	0	3	27	102	–75	3
The top 2 teams will qualify for the Cup Quarter-finals. Points breakdown: *3 points for a win *2 points for a draw *1 point for a loss

=== Pool D ===
==== Log ====
2012 7s Premier League Pool D Log
Position	Team	Played	Won	Drawn	Lost	Points For	Points Against	Points Difference	Points
1	Sharks	3	2	0	1	64	65	–1	7
2	Living Ball	3	1	0	2	69	52	+17	5
3	Lions	3	1	0	2	66	58	+8	5
The top 2 teams will qualify for the Cup Quarter-finals. Points breakdown: *3 points for a win *2 points for a draw *1 point for a loss

== Fixtures and results ==
=== Pool A v B ===
==== Round one ====
14 December 2012	NBM All-Stars	26 – 12	Boland Cavaliers
11:04

14 December 2012	Vikings	24 – 26	Mighty Mohicans
11:26

14 December 2012	Blue Bulls	19 – 26	Cheetahs
11:48

==== Round two ====
14 December 2012	NBM All-Stars	19 – 12	Cheetahs
14:00

14 December 2012	Vikings	14 – 35	Boland Cavaliers
14:22

14 December 2012	Blue Bulls	35 – 12	Mighty Mohicans
14:44

==== Round three ====
14 December 2012	NBM All-Stars	19 – 15	Mighty Mohicans
17:18

14 December 2012	Vikings	0 – 33	Cheetahs
17:40

14 December 2012	Blue Bulls	49 – 21	Boland Cavaliers
18:02

=== Pool C v D ===
==== Round one ====
14 December 2012	Samurai Sevens	19 – 12	Living Ball
12:10

14 December 2012	Kaizer Chiefs	22 – 14	Lions
12:32

14 December 2012	Western Province	22 – 24	Sharks
12:54

==== Round two ====
14 December 2012	Samurai Sevens	19 – 12	Sharks
15:06

14 December 2012	Kaizer Chiefs	33 – 19	Living Ball
15:28

14 December 2012	Western Province	5 – 40	Lions
15:50

==== Round three ====
14 December 2012	Samurai Sevens	31 – 12	Lions
18:24

14 December 2012	Kaizer Chiefs	24 – 28	Sharks
18:46

14 December 2012	Western Province	0 – 38	Living Ball
19:08

=== Cup ===
==== Quarter-finals ====
The four Cup Quarter-final winners will advance to the Cup Semi-Finals. The four losers will advance to the Plate Semi-Finals.

15 December 2012	NBM All-Stars	31 – 26 (aet)	Kaizer Chiefs
11:04

15 December 2012	Cheetahs	19 – 14 (aet)	Living Ball
11:26

15 December 2012	Samurai Sevens	12 – 7	Blue Bulls
11:48

15 December 2012	Sharks	8 – 5	Boland Cavaliers
12:10

==== Semi-finals ====
15 December 2012	NBM All-Stars	17 – 29	Cheetahs
14:44

15 December 2012	Samurai Sevens	22 – 5	Sharks
15:06

==== 3rd-place play-off ====
15 December 2012	NBM All-Stars	29 – 5	Sharks
17:18

==== Final ====
15 December 2012	Cheetahs	14 – 29	Samurai Sevens
18:02

=== Plate ===
==== Semi-finals ====
15 December 2012	Kaizer Chiefs	12 – 24	Living Ball
14:00

15 December 2012	Blue Bulls	22 – 7	Boland Cavaliers
14:22

==== 3rd-place play-off ====
15 December 2012	Kaizer Chiefs	24 – 12	Boland Cavaliers
16:12

==== Final ====
15 December 2012	Living Ball	24 – 12	Blue Bulls
16:56

=== Bowl ===
==== Semi-finals ====
15 December 2012	Vikings	12 – 15	Western Province
12:32

15 December 2012	Mighty Mohicans	0 – 17	Lions
12:54

==== 3rd-place play-off ====
15 December 2012	Vikings	19 – 12	Mighty Mohicans
15:50

==== Final ====
15 December 2012	Western Province	14 – 26	Lions
16:34

== Final classification ==
Position	Team
Cup
1	Samurai Sevens
2	Cheetahs
3	NBM All-Stars
4	Sharks
Plate
5	Living Ball
6	Blue Bulls
7	Kaizer Chiefs
8	Boland Cavaliers
Bowl
9	Lions
10	Western Province
11	Vikings
12	Mighty Mohicans

== Teams and Players ==
The participating teams were:

2012 Blue Bulls 7s Premier League squad
Players	Shaun Adendorff • Clayton Blommetjies • Cornelius Cooper • Christiaan de Bruin • Travis Ismaiel • Rohan Janse van Rensburg • Dan Kriel • Jason Kriel • Jesse Kriel • Jacques Rossouw • Roelof Smit • André Warner
Coach	Fielies Coetzee

2012 Boland Cavaliers 7s Premier League squad
Players	Tythan Adams • Brendon April • Garth April • Ashton Constant • Dual Erasmus • Thor Halvorsen • Adi Jacobs • Ntando Kebe • Franzel September • Albert Trytsman • Philip van Zyl • Ben Venter • Deston Wellman • Eric Zana
Coach	Abie Davids

2012 Cheetahs 7s Premier League squad
Players	Rayno Benjamin • Philip Burger • Tertius Daniller • Barry Geel • Hansie Graaff • Leon Karemaker • Willie le Roux • Kevin Luiters • Sarel Pretorius • Boom Prinsloo • Raymond Rhule • Johann Sadie • Marnus Schoeman • Torsten van Jaarsveld • Robbie van Schalkwyk • Piet van Zyl
Coach	Hawies Fourie

2012 Kaizer Chiefs 7s Premier League squad
Players	Junior Bester • Adrian Jacobs • Cameron Jacobs • Wilhelm Koch • Gareth Krause • Wandile Mjekevu • Friedrich Lombard • Jongi Nokwe • Breyton Paulse • Bom Samaai • Elmo Thomas
Coach	Gcobani Bobo

2012 Lions 7s Premier League squad
Players	Andries Coetzee • Robin Coetzee • Ruan Combrinck • Ross Cronjé • Morné Laubscher • Derick Minnie • Whestley Moolman • Jacques Nel • Ruhan Nel • Senzo Shabalala • Claude Tshidibi
Coach	JP Ferreira

2012 Living Ball 7s Premier League squad
Players	Alshaun Bock • Shaun Davids • Marius Delport • Dirk Dippenaar • Dean Heymans • Earl Lewis • Donovan Marais • Jonathan Mokuena • Reg Muller • Stefan Terblanche • Berty Visser • Wendal Wehr
Coach	Freddie Grobler

2012 Mighty Mohicans 7s Premier League squad
Players	Karlo Aspeling • Tiger Bax • Josh Bassingthwaighte • Jandré Blom • Chris Cloete • Stefan de Villiers • Julian Erasmus • Christopher Juries • Justin Peach • Richard Prinsloo • Izak Saaiman • Juan Smit • André Smit • NW Smit • Mark Winter
Coach	Dawie Snyman

2012 Sharks 7s Premier League squad
Players	Peet Coetzee • Calvin Karnezos • Sizo Maseko • Mzo Mbona • Gareth Meikle • Tera Mtembu • Milo Nqoro • Gouws Prinsloo • Sean Robinson • S'bura Sithole • Brynard Stander • Jaco van Tonder • Anton Verster
Coach	Roelof Kotzé

2012 NBM All-Stars 7s Premier League squad
Players	Bok Barnard • Stefan Basson • Jaco Bouwer • Danie Dames • Danwel Demas • Ben Gollings • Deon Helberg • JW Jonker • Zar Lawrence • MJ Mentz • Roscko Speckman • Juan Swanepoel
Coach	Jimmy Stonehouse

2012 Samurai Sevens 7s Premier League squad
Players	Derich Badenhorst • Henk de Ridder • Carel du Preez • Pieter Engelbrecht • Justin Geduld • Werner Kok • Shannon Rick • Seabelo Senatla • Kwagga Smith • Sergio Torrens • Jack Welsch • Jack Wilson
Coach	Marius Schoeman

2012 Vikings 7s Premier League squad
Players	Enrico Acker • Jonathan Adendorf • Guy Cronjé • Jacques Erasmus • Fabian Juries • Ruan Mostert • Kempie Rautenbach • Jody Reynecke • Lean Schwartz • Shane Spring • Mzwandile Stick • Anthony Volmink
Coach	Darryl Weir

2012 Western Province 7s Premier League squad
Players	Craig Berry • Dean Hammond • Arno Johnson • Clearance Khumalo • Dillyn Leyds • Freddie Muller • Sibusiso Notshe • Craig Pheiffer • Ryan Smith • Tim Swiel • Chevandré van Schoor • Kobus van Wyk
Coach	Jerome Paarwater
