= 2014 Currie Cup qualification =

Domestic rugby union competition

- Countries: South Africa
- Date: 7 June – 19 July 2014
- Promoted: Griquas
- Matches played: 21
- Tries scored: 193 (average 9.2 per match)
- Top point scorer: Jaun Kotzé (93)
- Top try scorer: Sylvian Mahuza / Luther Obi (10)

The 2014 Currie Cup qualification series was a tournament organised by the South African Rugby Union. It featured seven teams and was played in June and July 2014, with the winner qualifying for the 2014 Currie Cup Premier Division. The remaining six teams played in the 2014 Currie Cup First Division.

== Competition ==
On 13 February 2014, SARU announced that the Currie Cup Premier Division would be expanded from six to eight teams. The top five teams from 2013 – the Sharks, Western Province, Free State Cheetahs, Golden Lions and Blue Bulls – were guaranteed participation in the 2014 edition, as were the top two teams from the 2013 Currie Cup First Division, the Pumas and Eastern Province Kings.

The bottom side in 2013, the Griquas, as well as the remaining teams from the First Division – the Leopards, SWD Eagles, Boland Cavaliers, Griffons, Border Bulldogs and Falcons – played in a qualification tournament, with the winner also qualifying to the 2014 Currie Cup Premier Division.

The seven teams played each other once over the course of the qualification tournament, either at home or away. Teams received four points for a win and two points for a draw. Bonus points were awarded to teams that scored 4 or more tries in a game, as well as to teams that lost a match by 7 points or less. Teams were ranked by log points, then points difference (points scored less points conceded).

The top team qualified for the 2014 Currie Cup Premier Division, while the other six teams qualified for the 2014 Currie Cup First Division.

== Teams ==
Location of teams in 2014 Currie Cup qualification

2014 Currie Cup qualification teams
| Team | Sponsored Name | Stadium/s | Sponsored Name |
|---|---|---|---|
| Boland Cavaliers | Regent Boland Cavaliers | Boland Stadium, Wellington | Boland Stadium |
| Border Bulldogs | Border Bulldogs | Buffalo City Stadium, East London | Buffalo City Stadium |
| Falcons | Falcons | Barnard Stadium, Kempton Park | Barnard Stadium |
| Griffons | Down Touch Griffons | North West Stadium, Welkom | North West Stadium |
| Griquas | GWK Griquas | Griqua Park, Kimberley | GWK Park |
| Leopards | Leopards | Olën Park, Potchefstroom | Profert Olën Park |
| SWD Eagles | SWD Eagles | Outeniqua Park, George | Outeniqua Park |

== Log ==
2014 Currie Cup qualification log
| Pos | Team | Pld | W | D | L | PF | PA | PD | TF | TA | TB | LB | Pts | Qualification |
|---|---|---|---|---|---|---|---|---|---|---|---|---|---|---|
| 1 | Griquas | 6 | 6 | 0 | 0 | 246 | 101 | +145 | 36 | 14 | 4 | 0 | 28 | 2014 Currie Cup Premier Division |
| 2 | Leopards | 6 | 5 | 0 | 1 | 356 | 141 | +215 | 51 | 16 | 6 | 1 | 27 | 2014 Currie Cup First Division |
| 3 | Griffons | 6 | 3 | 0 | 3 | 183 | 213 | −30 | 25 | 30 | 5 | 1 | 18 | 2014 Currie Cup First Division |
| 4 | SWD Eagles | 6 | 3 | 0 | 3 | 163 | 245 | −82 | 23 | 33 | 3 | 0 | 15 | 2014 Currie Cup First Division |
| 5 | Boland Cavaliers | 6 | 2 | 0 | 4 | 140 | 156 | −16 | 17 | 21 | 2 | 2 | 12 | 2014 Currie Cup First Division |
| 6 | Falcons | 6 | 2 | 0 | 4 | 193 | 223 | −30 | 25 | 31 | 2 | 0 | 10 | 2014 Currie Cup First Division |
| 7 | Border Bulldogs | 6 | 0 | 0 | 6 | 118 | 320 | −202 | 16 | 48 | 1 | 1 | 2 | 2014 Currie Cup First Division |

Rules for classification: 4 points for a win; 2 points for a draw; 1 bonus point for a loss by seven points or less; 1 bonus point for scoring four or more tries in a match

== Fixtures and results ==
The fixture list for the 2014 Currie Cup Premier Division was released on 11 March 2014:

=== Round One ===
| 6 June 2014 | Griquas | 52–5 | Border Bulldogs | Griqua Park, Kimberley |
| 15:00 | Try: Marnus Schoeman 2', 31', 61'; Johnathan Francke 13'; Burger Schoeman 20'; Martin Bezuidenhout 54'; Jaco Nepgen 70'; Carel Greeff 78'; Con: Gouws Prinsloo 3', 14', 21', 32', 62', 79' (6/8) | Report; Scoreboard | Try: Sipho Nofemele 72'; Con: Masixole Banda (0/1); Pen: Oliver Zono (0/1); Cards: Siya Mdaka (yellow card) 60' to 70' | Attendance: 500; Referee: Christie du Preez |

| 7 June 2014 | Griffons | 27–25 | Boland Cavaliers | North West Stadium, Welkom |
| 15:00 | Try: Norman Nelson 30' penalty try 50'; Con: Franna du Toit 51' (1/2); Pen: Franna du Toit 7', 17', 34', 55', 80' (5/8); Cards: Heinrich Roelfse (yellow card) 59' to 65' | Report; Scoreboard | Try: Eric Zana 12', 59'; Ulrich Pretorius 77'; Con: Eric Zana 13', 78' (2/3); Pen: Eric Zana 2', 25' (2/3); Cards: Richard Lawson (yellow card) 49' to 59'; Albert Trytsman (yellow card) 54' to 62' | Referee: Pro Legoete |

| 7 June 2014 | Leopards | 51–23 | SWD Eagles | Olën Park, Potchefstroom |
| 15:00 | Try: Rhyk Welgemoed 18'; Sylvian Mahuza 20', 63'; Juan Language 31', 42'; Stompie de Wet 50'; Luther Obi 68'; Con: André Pretorius 19', 21', 32', 64', 69' (5/7); Pen: André Pretorius 59' (1/1); Drop: André Pretorius 71' (1/1) | Report; Scoreboard | Try: Alshaun Bock 24'; Kurt Haupt 78'; Con: Karlo Aspeling 25', 79' (2/2); Pen: Karlo Aspeling 3', 11', 40' (3/3); Cards: Junior Bester (yellow card) 41' to 51' | Attendance: 500; Referee: Ben Crouse |

Bye/s: Falcons

=== Round Two ===
| 13 June 2014 | Falcons | 22–45 | Leopards | Barnard Stadium, Kempton Park |
| 15:00 | Try: Riaan Arends 27', 48'; Arno Poley 55'; Con: Jaun Kotzé 27', 55' (2/3); Drop: Jaun Kotzé 7' (1/1); Cards: Jacques Verwey (yellow card) 77' | Report; Scoreboard | Try: Kobus de Kock 14', 68'; Francois Robertse 52'; Stairs Mhlongo 61'; George Tossel 69'; Juan Language 81'; Con: André Pretorius 14', 52', 61', 68', 69', 81' (6/6); Pen: André Pretorius 35' (1/1) | Attendance: 50; Referee: Rasta Rasivhenge |

| 13 June 2014 | SWD Eagles | 40–37 | Griffons | Outeniqua Park, George |
| 19:00 | Try: Luzuko Vulindlu 2'; Junior Bester 50'; Kurt Haupt 52'; Shaun Raubenheimer 61'; Alshaun Bock 64'; Dwayne Kelly 69'; Con: Karlo Aspeling 3', 50', 52', 65', 69' (5/6) | Report; Scoreboard | Try: Vuyo Mbotho 11'; Erik le Roux 30'; Elandré Huggett 38'; Norman Nelson 42'; Japie Nel 54'; Con: Franna du Toit 12' (1/1); Colin Herbert 31', 39' (2/4); Pen: Franna du Toit 6' (1/1); Colin Herbert 35' (1/1); Cards: Frans Sisita (yellow card) 68' to 78' | Referee: Christie du Preez |

| 14 June 2014 | Boland Cavaliers | 3–21 | Griquas | Boland Stadium, Wellington |
| 16:00 | Pen: Eric Zana 47' (1/3) | Report; Scoreboard | Try: Gouws Prinsloo 24'; Hilton Lobberts 56'; Howard Mnisi 80'; Con: Gouws Prinsloo (0/1); Francois Brummer (0/1); Marais Schmidt (0/1); Pen: Gouws Prinsloo 40', 44' (2/2); Cards: Hilton Lobberts (yellow card) 7' to 17'; Johnathan Francke (yellow card) 14' to 25' | Attendance: 560; Referee: Ben Crouse |

Bye/s: Border Bulldogs

=== Round Three ===
| 20 June 2014 | Border Bulldogs | 12–37 | Boland Cavaliers | Buffalo City Stadium, East London |
| 18:00 | Try: Johannes Jonker 20'; Yanga Xakalashe 78'; Con: Masixole Banda 79' (1/2); Cards: Rynardt van Wyk (yellow card) 34' to 44' | Report; Scoreboard | Try: Franzel September 6', 23'; Harlon Klaasen 15'; Martin Dreyer 36'; Eric Zana 60'; Arno Fortuin 65'; Con: Eric Zana 7', 61' (2/6); Pen: Eric Zana 54' (1/1); Cards: Martin Dreyer (yellow card) 20' to 30'; Ulrich Pretorius (yellow card) 75'; Khwezi Mkhafu (yellow card) 76' | Attendance: 300; Referee: Ben Crouse |

| 20 June 2014 | SWD Eagles | 34–52 | Falcons | Outeniqua Park, George |
| 19:00 | Try: Alshaun Bock 6'; Anver Venter 26'; Dwayne Kelly 43'; Brian Skosana 54'; Mzwanele Zito 77'; Con: Karlo Aspeling 7', 43', 54' (3/5); Pen: Elric van Vuuren 36' (1/1); Cards: Elric van Vuuren (yellow card) 64' to 74' | Report; Scoreboard | Try: Riaan Arends 18', 32'; JP Mostert 23'; Shane Kirkwood 59'; Jaun Kotzé 61'; Anrich Richter 69'; Marlyn Williams 79'; Con: Jaun Kotzé 18', 24', 59', 69' (4/7); Pen: Jaun Kotzé 11', 38', 65' (3/3); Drop: Jaun Kotzé (0/1) | Attendance: 1,200; Referee: Quinton Immelman |

| 21 June 2014 | Griquas | 33–32 | Leopards | Griqua Park, Kimberley |
| 13:00 | Try: Nico Scheepers 10'; Marnus Schoeman 24'; Burger Schoeman 35'; Con: Nico Scheepers 11', 25', 36' (3/3); Pen: Nico Scheepers 6', 39', 55', 63' (4/5) | Report; Scoreboard | Try: Juan Language 32'; George Tossel 45'; Sylvian Mahuza 70'; Luther Obi 75'; Con: André Pretorius (0/1); Adriaan Engelbrecht 45', 71', 75' (3/3); Pen: Adriaan Engelbrecht 13', 40' (2/2) | Attendance: 1,000; Referee: Marius Jonker |

Bye/s: Griffons

=== Round Four ===
| 28 June 2014 | Boland Cavaliers | 17–21 | SWD Eagles | Boland Stadium, Wellington |
| 15:00 | Try: Khwezi Mkhafu 32'; Eric Zana 69'; Con: Eric Zana 33', 70' (2/2); Pen: Eric Zana 23' (1/2) | Report; Scoreboard | Try: Daniel Roberts 9'; Dwayne Kelly 52'; Brian Skosana 60'; Con: Karlo Aspeling 10' (1/1); Elric van Vuuren 53', 61' (2/2); Pen: Karlo Aspeling (0/1); Cards: Kurt Haupt (yellow card) 68' to 78' | Attendance: 470; Referee: Jaco van Heerden |

| 28 June 2014 | Griffons | 24–43 | Griquas | North West Stadium, Welkom |
| 15:00 | Try: Norman Nelson 2'; Tertius Maarman 41'; Japie Nel 65'; Danie van der Merwe 78'; Con: Colin Herbert 3' (1/2); Pieter-Steyn de Wet 66' (1/2) | Report; Scoreboard | Try: Jonathan Adendorf 8'; Ederies Arendse 12'; Carel Greeff 20', 30', 54'; Francois Brummer 60'; Howard Mnisi 69'; Con: Nico Scheepers 9', 21' (2/4); Francois Brummer 61', 70' (2/3); Cards: Howard Mnisi (yellow card) 38' to 47' | Attendance: 250; Referee: Rasta Rasivhenge |

| 28 June 2014 | Falcons | 54–40 | Border Bulldogs | Barnard Stadium, Kempton Park |
| 15:30 | Try: Chris Richardson 13'; Cecil Dumond 27'; Grant Janke 43'; Jaun Kotzé 48'; Anrich Richter 63'; Jacques Verwey 69'; Coert Cronjé 76'; Etienne Taljaard 81'; Con: Jaun Kotzé 13', 43', 48', 63', 69', 81' (6/7); Coert Cronjé 76' (1/1); Drop: Jaun Kotzé (0/1) | Report; Scoreboard | Try: Gareth Krause 7'; Thembani Mkokeli 22', 40'; Lindani Ndlela 30'; Wayne Lemley 41'; Oliver Zono 74'; Con: Masixole Banda 22', 30', 40', 41', 74' (5/6); Cards: Yanga Xakalashe (yellow card) 65' to 75' | Attendance: 50; Referee: Marius van der Westhuizen |

Bye/s: Leopards

=== Round Five ===
| 4 July 2014 | Border Bulldogs | 31–33 | SWD Eagles | Buffalo City Stadium, East London |
| 18:00 | Try: Lundi Ralarala 18'; Masixole Banda 20'; Lindani Ndlela 79'; Con: Masixole Banda 19', 21' (2/3); Pen: Masixole Banda 1', 10', 33', 48' (4/5) | Report; Scoreboard | Try: Brian Skosana 7'; Shaun Raubenheimer 39'; Dwayne Kelly 57'; Kurt Haupt 63'; Hentzwill Pedro 70'; Con: Elric van Vuuren 8', 40', 58', 63' (4/5) | Attendance: 1,200; Referee: Jaco van Heerden |

| 5 July 2014 | Falcons | 20–35 | Boland Cavaliers | Barnard Stadium, Kempton Park |
| 14:30 | Try: Coert Cronjé 43'; Jaun Kotzé 81'; Con: Jaun Kotzé 44', 82' (2/2); Pen: Jaun Kotzé 9', 61' (2/2) | Report; Scoreboard | Try: Duwayne Smart 11'; Nathaniel Manuel 28'; Ryno Coetzee 54', 66'; Con: Morné Hugo 12', 29', 67' (3/4); Pen: Morné Hugo 40', 80' (2/3); Drop: Morné Hugo 38' (1/1) | Referee: Pro Legoete |

| 5 July 2014 | Leopards | 70–25 | Griffons | Olën Park, Potchefstroom |
| 15:00 | Try: Stompie de Wet 5'; Francois Robertse 18'; Hoffmann Maritz 29', 49'; Luther Obi 40', 80'; Dillon Smit 44'; Sylvian Mahuza 65', 72'; John-Roy Jenkinson 68'; Con: André Pretorius 6', 19', 30', 40', 45', 50', 66', 69', 73', 81' (10/10) | Report; Scoreboard | Try: Norman Nelson 34', 46'; Armandt Koster 60'; Nicky Steyn 78'; Con: Pieter-Steyn de Wet 61' (1/4); Pen: Pieter-Steyn de Wet 15' (1/1); Cards: Elandré Huggett (yellow card) 39' to 50' | Attendance: 0 Referee: Marius van der Westhuizen |

Bye/s: Griquas

=== Round Six ===
| 11 July 2014 | Border Bulldogs | 15–41 | Griffons | Buffalo City Stadium, East London |
| 18:00 | Try: Siya Mdaka 36'; Lundi Ralarala 49'; Con: Masixole Banda 37' (1/2); Pen: Masixole Banda 20' (1/1); Cards: Siyamthanda Ngande (yellow card) 66' to 76' | Report; Scoreboard | Try: Norman Nelson 11'; Nicky Steyn 23'; Boela Abrahams 29'; Armandt Koster 38'; Joubert Engelbrecht 55'; Tertius Maarman 60'; Con: Pieter-Steyn de Wet 12', 30', 39', 56' (4/6); Pen: Pieter-Steyn de Wet 18' (1/1) | Attendance: 300; Referee: Pro Legoete |

| 12 July 2014 | Boland Cavaliers | 23–55 | Leopards | Boland Stadium, Wellington |
| 14:30 | Try: Christian Rust 58'; Franzel September 68'; Con: Eric Zana 59', 69' (2/2); Pen: Morné Hugo 15', 24', 32' (3/4) | Report; Scoreboard | Try: Dillon Smit 6', 47'; Juan Language 10', 64'; Hoffmann Maritz 36'; Luther Obi 40', 55'; Sylvian Mahuza 44'; Kobus de Kock 78'; Con: André Pretorius 7', 37', 48', 56' (4/8); Adriaan Engelbrecht 79' (1/1) | Referee: Rasta Rasivhenge |

| 12 July 2014 | Griquas | 40–25 | Falcons | Griqua Park, Kimberley |
| 15:00 | Try: Marnus Schoeman 15', 19'; Boela Serfontein 33'; Burger Schoeman 43'; Tian Meyer 50', 56'; Con: Francois Brummer 15', 20', 34', 43', 51' (5/6); Cards: Jaco Nepgen (yellow card) 72' | Report; Scoreboard | Try: Riaan Arends 45'; Jaun Kotzé 48'; Andrew van Wyk 60'; Con: Jaun Kotzé 46', 60' (2/3); Pen: Jaun Kotzé 24' (1/1); Drop: Jaun Kotzé 3' (1/1); Cards: JP Mostert (yellow card) 33' to 43' | Referee: Ben Crouse |

Bye/s: SWD Eagles

=== Round Seven ===
| 18 July 2014 | Griffons | 29–20 | Falcons | North West Stadium, Welkom |
| 15:00 | Try: Japie Nel 25', 77'; Armandt Koster 51'; Erik le Roux 74'; Con: Pieter-Steyn de Wet 26' (1/1); Louis Strydom 52', 78' (2/3); Pen: Louis Strydom 48' (1/1); Cards: Boela Abrahams (yellow card) 32' to 41'; Frans Sisita (yellow card) 65' to 75' | Report; Scoreboard | Try: Jaun Kotzé 34'; Kyle Hendricks 43'; Con: Jaun Kotzé 34', 44' (2/2); Pen: Jaun Kotzé 40', 66' (2/3) |

| 19 July 2014 | SWD Eagles | 12–57 | Griquas | Outeniqua Park, George |
| 14:30 | Try: Hentzwill Pedro 71'; Christo du Plessis 80'; Con: Elric van Vuuren 81' (1/2) | Report; Scoreboard | Try: Ryno Barnes 11', 60'; Carel Greeff 16', 39'; Johnathan Francke 28'; Ederies Arendse 30'; Maks van Dyk 44'; Marnus Schoeman 50'; Tian Meyer 63'; Con: Francois Brummer 12', 16' (2/4); Nico Scheepers 40', 45', 51', 63' (4/5) |

| 19 July 2014 | Leopards | 103–15 | Border Bulldogs | Olën Park, Potchefstroom |
| 15:00 | Try: Luther Obi 4', 33', 68', 71'; Sylvian Mahuza 7', 14', 35', 42'; George Tossel 21', 55'; Hoffmann Maritz 26'; Dillon Smit 30'; Morné Hanekom 65'; Francois Robertse 75'; Kobus de Kock 80'; Con: André Pretorius 5', 8', 15', 22', 27', 34', 36', 43', 55', 65', 69', 72', 75', 81' (14/15) | Report; Scoreboard | Try: Michael Makase 45'; Bangi Kobese 77'; Con: Masixole Banda 78' (1/2); Pen: Masixole Banda 2' (1/1) | Attendance: 150 |

Bye/s: Boland Cavaliers

== Players ==
=== Player statistics ===
The following table contain points which were scored during the 2014 Currie Cup qualification tournament:

Top point scorers
| No | Player | Team | T | C | P | DG | Pts |
|---|---|---|---|---|---|---|---|
| 1 | Jaun Kotzé | Falcons | 5 | 19 | 8 | 2 | 93 |
| 2 | André Pretorius | Leopards | 0 | 37 | 2 | 1 | 83 |
| 3 | Sylvian Mahuza | Leopards | 10 | 0 | 0 | 0 | 50 |
| 3 | Luther Obi | Leopards | 10 | 0 | 0 | 0 | 50 |
| 5 | Eric Zana | Boland Cavaliers | 4 | 7 | 5 | 0 | 49 |
| 6 | Masixole Banda | Border Bulldogs | 1 | 10 | 6 | 0 | 43 |
| 7 | Nico Scheepers | Griquas | 1 | 9 | 4 | 0 | 35 |
| 7 | Marnus Schoeman | Griquas | 7 | 0 | 0 | 0 | 35 |
| 9 | Karlo Aspeling | SWD Eagles | 0 | 11 | 3 | 0 | 31 |
| 10 | Carel Greeff | Griquas | 6 | 0 | 0 | 0 | 30 |
| 10 | Juan Language | Leopards | 6 | 0 | 0 | 0 | 30 |
| 10 | Norman Nelson | Griffons | 6 | 0 | 0 | 0 | 30 |
| 13 | Riaan Arends | Falcons | 5 | 0 | 0 | 0 | 25 |
| 14 | Morné Hugo | Boland Cavaliers | 0 | 3 | 5 | 1 | 24 |
| 15 | Francois Brummer | Griquas | 1 | 9 | 0 | 0 | 23 |
| 15 | Gouws Prinsloo | Griquas | 1 | 6 | 2 | 0 | 23 |
| 17 | Franna du Toit | Griffons | 0 | 2 | 6 | 0 | 22 |
| 18 | Kobus de Kock | Leopards | 4 | 0 | 0 | 0 | 20 |
| 18 | Pieter-Steyn de Wet | Griffons | 0 | 7 | 2 | 0 | 20 |
| 18 | Dwayne Kelly | SWD Eagles | 4 | 0 | 0 | 0 | 20 |
| 18 | Hoffmann Maritz | Leopards | 4 | 0 | 0 | 0 | 20 |
| 18 | Japie Nel | Griffons | 4 | 0 | 0 | 0 | 20 |
| 18 | Dillon Smit | Leopards | 4 | 0 | 0 | 0 | 20 |
| 18 | George Tossel | Leopards | 4 | 0 | 0 | 0 | 20 |
| 25 | Adriaan Engelbrecht | Leopards | 0 | 6 | 2 | 0 | 18 |
| 26 | Elric van Vuuren | SWD Eagles | 0 | 7 | 1 | 0 | 17 |
| 27 | Alshaun Bock | SWD Eagles | 3 | 0 | 0 | 0 | 15 |
| 27 | Kurt Haupt | SWD Eagles | 3 | 0 | 0 | 0 | 15 |
| 27 | Armandt Koster | Griffons | 3 | 0 | 0 | 0 | 15 |
| 27 | Tian Meyer | Griquas | 3 | 0 | 0 | 0 | 15 |
| 27 | Francois Robertse | Leopards | 3 | 0 | 0 | 0 | 15 |
| 27 | Burger Schoeman | Griquas | 3 | 0 | 0 | 0 | 15 |
| 27 | Franzel September | Boland Cavaliers | 3 | 0 | 0 | 0 | 15 |
| 27 | Brian Skosana | SWD Eagles | 3 | 0 | 0 | 0 | 15 |
| 35 | Ederies Arendse | Griquas | 2 | 0 | 0 | 0 | 10 |
| 35 | Ryno Barnes | Griquas | 2 | 0 | 0 | 0 | 10 |
| 35 | Ryno Coetzee | Boland Cavaliers | 2 | 0 | 0 | 0 | 10 |
| 35 | Coert Cronjé | Falcons | 2 | 0 | 0 | 0 | 10 |
| 35 | Stompie de Wet | Leopards | 2 | 0 | 0 | 0 | 10 |
| 35 | Johnathan Francke | Griquas | 2 | 0 | 0 | 0 | 10 |
| 35 | Erik le Roux | Griffons | 2 | 0 | 0 | 0 | 10 |
| 35 | Tertius Maarman | Griffons | 2 | 0 | 0 | 0 | 10 |
| 35 | Thembani Mkokeli | Border Bulldogs | 2 | 0 | 0 | 0 | 10 |
| 35 | Howard Mnisi | Griquas | 2 | 0 | 0 | 0 | 10 |
| 35 | Lindani Ndlela | Border Bulldogs | 2 | 0 | 0 | 0 | 10 |
| 35 | Hentzwill Pedro | SWD Eagles | 2 | 0 | 0 | 0 | 10 |
| 35 | Lundi Ralarala | Border Bulldogs | 2 | 0 | 0 | 0 | 10 |
| 35 | Shaun Raubenheimer | SWD Eagles | 2 | 0 | 0 | 0 | 10 |
| 35 | Anrich Richter | Falcons | 2 | 0 | 0 | 0 | 10 |
| 35 | Nicky Steyn | Griffons | 2 | 0 | 0 | 0 | 10 |
| 51 | Colin Herbert | Griffons | 0 | 3 | 1 | 0 | 9 |
| 52 | Christian Rust | Boland Cavaliers | 1 | 1 | 0 | 0 | 7 |
| 52 | Louis Strydom | Griffons | 0 | 2 | 1 | 0 | 7 |
| 54 | Boela Abrahams | Griffons | 1 | 0 | 0 | 0 | 5 |
| 54 | Jonathan Adendorf | Griquas | 1 | 0 | 0 | 0 | 5 |
| 54 | Junior Bester | SWD Eagles | 1 | 0 | 0 | 0 | 5 |
| 54 | Martin Bezuidenhout | Griquas | 1 | 0 | 0 | 0 | 5 |
| 54 | Martin Dreyer | Boland Cavaliers | 1 | 0 | 0 | 0 | 5 |
| 54 | Cecil Dumond | Falcons | 1 | 0 | 0 | 0 | 5 |
| 54 | Christo du Plessis | SWD Eagles | 1 | 0 | 0 | 0 | 5 |
| 54 | Joubert Engelbrecht | Griffons | 1 | 0 | 0 | 0 | 5 |
| 54 | Arno Fortuin | Boland Cavaliers | 1 | 0 | 0 | 0 | 5 |
| 54 | Morné Hanekom | Leopards | 1 | 0 | 0 | 0 | 5 |
| 54 | Kyle Hendricks | Falcons | 1 | 0 | 0 | 0 | 5 |
| 54 | Elandré Huggett | Griffons | 1 | 0 | 0 | 0 | 5 |
| 54 | Grant Janke | Falcons | 1 | 0 | 0 | 0 | 5 |
| 54 | John-Roy Jenkinson | Leopards | 1 | 0 | 0 | 0 | 5 |
| 54 | Johannes Jonker | Border Bulldogs | 1 | 0 | 0 | 0 | 5 |
| 54 | Shane Kirkwood | Falcons | 1 | 0 | 0 | 0 | 5 |
| 54 | Harlon Klaasen | Boland Cavaliers | 1 | 0 | 0 | 0 | 5 |
| 54 | Bangi Kobese | Border Bulldogs | 1 | 0 | 0 | 0 | 5 |
| 54 | Gareth Krause | Border Bulldogs | 1 | 0 | 0 | 0 | 5 |
| 54 | Wayne Lemley | Border Bulldogs | 1 | 0 | 0 | 0 | 5 |
| 54 | Hilton Lobberts | Griquas | 1 | 0 | 0 | 0 | 5 |
| 54 | Michael Makase | Border Bulldogs | 1 | 0 | 0 | 0 | 5 |
| 54 | Nathaniel Manuel | Boland Cavaliers | 1 | 0 | 0 | 0 | 5 |
| 54 | Vuyo Mbotho | Griffons | 1 | 0 | 0 | 0 | 5 |
| 54 | Stairs Mhlongo | Leopards | 1 | 0 | 0 | 0 | 5 |
| 54 | Khwezi Mkhafu | Boland Cavaliers | 1 | 0 | 0 | 0 | 5 |
| 54 | JP Mostert | Falcons | 1 | 0 | 0 | 0 | 5 |
| 54 | Jaco Nepgen | Griquas | 1 | 0 | 0 | 0 | 5 |
| 54 | Sipho Nofemele | Border Bulldogs | 1 | 0 | 0 | 0 | 5 |
| 54 | Arno Poley | Falcons | 1 | 0 | 0 | 0 | 5 |
| 54 | Ulrich Pretorius | Boland Cavaliers | 1 | 0 | 0 | 0 | 5 |
| 54 | Chris Richardson | Falcons | 1 | 0 | 0 | 0 | 5 |
| 54 | Daniel Roberts | SWD Eagles | 1 | 0 | 0 | 0 | 5 |
| 54 | Boela Serfontein | Griquas | 1 | 0 | 0 | 0 | 5 |
| 54 | Duwayne Smart | Boland Cavaliers | 1 | 0 | 0 | 0 | 5 |
| 54 | Etienne Taljaard | Falcons | 1 | 0 | 0 | 0 | 5 |
| 54 | Danie van der Merwe | Griffons | 1 | 0 | 0 | 0 | 5 |
| 54 | Maks van Dyk | Griquas | 1 | 0 | 0 | 0 | 5 |
| 54 | Andrew van Wyk | Falcons | 1 | 0 | 0 | 0 | 5 |
| 54 | Rynardt van Wyk | Border Bulldogs | 1 | 0 | 0 | 0 | 5 |
| 54 | Anver Venter | SWD Eagles | 1 | 0 | 0 | 0 | 5 |
| 54 | Jacques Verwey | Falcons | 1 | 0 | 0 | 0 | 5 |
| 54 | Luzuko Vulindlu | SWD Eagles | 1 | 0 | 0 | 0 | 5 |
| 54 | Rhyk Welgemoed | Leopards | 1 | 0 | 0 | 0 | 5 |
| 54 | Marlyn Williams | Falcons | 1 | 0 | 0 | 0 | 5 |
| 54 | Yanga Xakalashe | Border Bulldogs | 1 | 0 | 0 | 0 | 5 |
| 54 | Mzwanele Zito | SWD Eagles | 1 | 0 | 0 | 0 | 5 |
| 54 | Oliver Zono | Border Bulldogs | 1 | 0 | 0 | 0 | 5 |
* Legend: T = Tries, C = Conversions, P = Penalties, DG = Drop Goals, Pts = Points.

== See also ==
- 2014 Currie Cup Premier Division
- 2014 Currie Cup First Division
- 2014 Vodacom Cup
