= Renier Schoeman =

Renier Schoeman may refer to:

- Renier Schoeman (rugby union)
- Renier Schoeman (politician)
