= Vuyo Mbotho =

South African rugby union player

- Born: 28 September 1988 (age 38) King William's Town, South Africa
- Height: 1.83 m (6 ft 0 in)
- Weight: 90 kg (14 st 2 lb; 198 lb)
- School: Lukhozi High School, Debe Nek
- University: University of Fort Hare

Rugby union career
- Position(s): Winger, Fullback, Centre
- Current team: Leopards
Amateur team(s)
Years	Team	Apps	(Points)
2011–2012	UFH Blues		
Senior career
Years	Team	Apps	(Points)
2010–2012	Border Bulldogs	15	(10)
2013–2017	Griffons	85	(150)
2018–2019	SWD Eagles	25	(15)
2021	Border Bulldogs	5	(0)
2022–	Leopards		
- Correct as of 27 March 2022

Vuyo Mbotho (born 28 September 1988 in King William's Town, South Africa) is a South African rugby union player for the Border Bulldogs in the Currie Cup and the Rugby Challenge. His regular position is winger, but he has on occasion played as a fullback or outside centre.

== Career ==
=== Border Bulldogs ===
He made his first class debut for East London-based side Border Bulldogs during the 2011 Vodacom Cup, starting in their opening round match against the Sharks XV in Durban. He made a total of six appearances during the competition and opened his scoring by scoring a try early in the second half in their match against the SWD Eagles in Beaufort West.

In 2011, he was included in the Border Bulldogs squad for the 2011 Currie Cup First Division. He started their first match of the season against the Boland Cavaliers in Wellington to make his Currie Cup debut. He played in all ten of their matches during the season and scored five tries – two of those in a match against the Eastern Province Kings in Port Elizabeth – to finish as the Bulldogs' joint-top try scorer with Ntabeni Dukisa.

At the start of 2012, he was selected for a Southern Kings side that played a trial match against the Cheetahs prior to the latter's 2012 Super Rugby season, scoring two tries in a 33–20 defeat. He returned to action for the Bulldogs in the 2012 Vodacom Cup, scoring a single try in six starts, and made a further three appearances in the 2012 Currie Cup First Division.

=== Griffons ===
For the 2013 season, Mbotho made the move to Welkom to join the Griffons. He immediately became a regular in the side, starting all seven their matches during the 2013 Vodacom Cup competition, scoring tries in their matches against the Golden Lions and the Falcons. He played nine times for the side during the 2013 Currie Cup First Division season, failing to score any points as the Griffons finished in sixth spot.

He once again started all their matches in the 2014 Vodacom Cup and made a further five appearances during the 2014 Currie Cup qualification tournament, where the Griffons finished third to qualify for the 2014 Currie Cup First Division. He was a key member of their First Division-winning side. He played in the final and helped the Griffons win the match 23–21 to win their first trophy for six years.
