= Yanga Xakalashe =

South African rugby union player

- Born: 16 August 1983 (age 43) East London, South Africa
- Height: 1.60 m (5 ft 3 in)
- Weight: 132 kg (20 st 11 lb; 291 lb)
- School: Gwaba Combined School, East London

Rugby union career
- Position: Prop
- Current team: Border Bulldogs
Youth career
- 2005: Border Bulldogs
Senior career
Years	Team	Apps	(Points)
2006	Border Bulldogs	0	(0)
2014–present	Border Bulldogs	66	(5)
- Correct as of 25 August 2019

Yanga Xakalashe (born 16 August 1983 in East London, South Africa) is a South African rugby union player, currently playing with the Border Bulldogs. His regular position is prop.

== Career ==
He was a member of the Border U21 side that played in the 2005 Under-21 Provincial Championship. The following season, he was included on the bench for the Border Bulldogs' senior side for their 2006 Vodacom Cup match against Western Province. However, he failed to make an appearance in a 9–18 defeat to their Western Cape rivals.

He played club rugby over the next few seasons and it wasn't until eight years later that he got another chance at provincial level; he was one of several amateur players brought into the Border Bulldogs provincial set-up at the start of 2014 after the professional side was declared bankrupt. He was included in their squad for the 2014 Vodacom Cup competition and made his debut in their first match of the season against the Sharks XV. He came on as a replacement ten minutes into the second half to make his first class debut, aged 30 years, 203 days. He made four appearances off the bench before starting their final two matches of the competition against the SWD Eagles and Boland Cavaliers.

He was also named in their squad for the 2014 Currie Cup qualification tournament, with a spot in the 2014 Currie Cup Premier Division up for grabs for the winners. His first Currie Cup start came in their Round One match against eventual winners Griquas in a 5–52 defeat. In his next match, against Boland Cavaliers in East London, Xakalashe scored his first senior try, a consolation try in a 12–37 defeat. He made three more appearances, including one start in their final match against the Leopards in Potchefstroom. A 103–15 win for the home team ensured the competition ended in disastrous fashion for the Bulldogs, who lost all six their matches. He played a further five times during the 2014 Currie Cup First Division and featured in their only win of the season, a 19–18 victory over the Falcons.

Xakalashe was retained for 2015, being included in the Border Bulldogs squad for the 2015 Vodacom Cup competition.
