= Ntabeni Dukisa =

South African rugby union player

- Born: 25 July 1988 (age 38)
- School: Loyolo High School

Rugby union career
- Position: Fly-half
- Current team: Kabras Sugar
Youth career
- 2008–2009: Border Bulldogs
Senior career
Years	Team	Apps	(Points)
2010–2012	Border Bulldogs	26	(165)
2012	→ Griffons	5	(0)
2013–2014	Eastern Province Kings	32	(109)
2015–2016	Griquas	29	(88)
2017–2019	Southern Kings	19	(36)
2017	Border Bulldogs	3	(10)
2017–2019	Eastern Province Elephants	7	(52)
2022–	Border Bulldogs	1	(0)
- Correct as of 21 May 2022
International career
Years	Team	Apps	(Points)
2012	South African Barbarians (South)	1	(5)
- Correct as of 23 February 2013

Ntabeni Dukisa (born 25 July 1988) is a professional South African rugby union player for Kenyan side Kabras Sugar. His can play as a fly-half, fullback or wing.

== Career ==
=== Youth ===
Dukisa came through the Border youth system and played for the Border U21 in the 2008 and 2009 Under-21 Provincial Championships.

=== Border Bulldogs ===
In 2010, he graduated to the first team, making his debut in the final game of the 2010 Currie Cup First Division season against the Falcons.

He became a regular for the Bulldogs in the following season; he made seven appearances for the side in the 2011 Vodacom Cup competition, contributing five points with the boot through a penalty in the opening match of the season against the Leopards and a conversion against the Griffons in their only win of the competition two weeks later. He started eight of their ten matches during the 2011 Currie Cup First Division competition, scoring five tries, eight conversions and sixteen penalties to end the season as the Bulldogs' top scorer with 89, the fifth highest overall in the competition. That included a haul of 27 points in their 57–42 defeat to the Falcons in Kempton Park.

He continued scoring at a similar rate during the 2012 Vodacom Cup competition, where he got 63 points in six matches, of which he started four. He was once again the Bulldogs' top scorer in the competition and also proved a key figure in their only win of the competition, a 47–31 victory over the SWD Eagles in the final round of matches, with Dukisa kicking five conversions and four penalties. He started three of the side's matches during the 2012 Currie Cup First Division competition, scoring eight points.

=== Griffons ===
During the 2012 Currie Cup First Division, Dukisa joined the Griffons on a short loan deal. He made five appearances for them to help them reach the semi-finals of the competition. He started in their semi-final match against the Pumas, but could not prevent the Griffons losing 37–30 to the Nelspruit-based side.

=== Eastern Province Kings ===
He signed a contract to join the Eastern Province Kings for 2013 on a two-year deal. He was initially named in the Southern Kings wider training squad for the 2013 Super Rugby season, but was subsequently released to the Vodacom Cup squad. He made five appearances during the 2013 Vodacom Cup competition, scoring a try, a conversion and a penalty in their match against the Sharks XV.

He made his first appearance in the Currie Cup competition for the Kings in the opening fixture of the 2013 Currie Cup First Division season, when he appeared as a substitute in the match against the Pumas. He made a total of four starts and nine substitute appearances for the Kings during the competition, helping them reach the final, where they lost 53–30 to the Pumas. He scored a total of 44 points during the season.

He played a full season in the 2014 Vodacom Cup competition, featuring in all seven of their matches and finishing as the EP Kings' top scorer with 50 points. Despite initially moving to Wellington-based side Boland Cavaliers on loan prior to the 2014 Currie Cup qualification tournament, he returned to the Kings shortly after to be closer to his sick mother. In June 2014, he was selected on the bench for the Eastern Province Kings side to face Wales during a tour match during a 2014 incoming tour. He came on with 8 minutes to go in the match as the Kings suffered a 12–34 defeat. He played in the Premier League of the Currie Cup for the first time in 2014, starting three matches and appearing as a substitute on a further three occasions. He also scored a try in their match against the Free State Cheetahs.

=== Griquas ===
He joined Kimberley-based side Griquas prior to the 2015 season.

=== Representative rugby ===
Whilst at the Border Bulldogs, Dukisa was selected in a South African Barbarians (South) side that played against England during their 2012 tour of South Africa. Dukisa came on as a substitute just after half-time in the match in Kimberley and he scored a try a few minutes later as the Barbarians lost 26–54 to the touring side.
