= SP Marais =

South African rugby union player

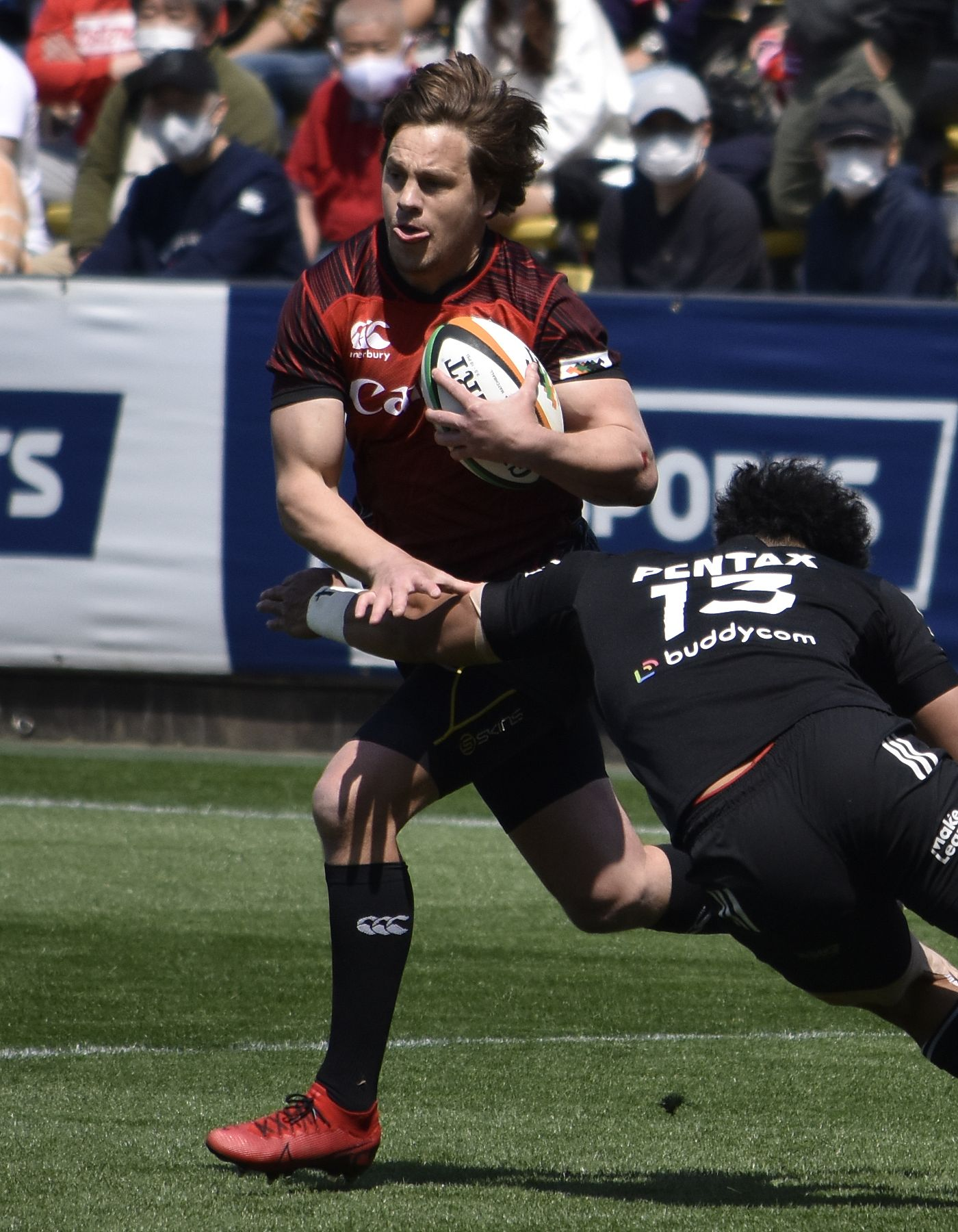
- Full name: Sarel Petrus Marais
- Born: 16 March 1989 (age 37) Parow, Cape Province, South Africa
- Height: 1.84 m (6 ft 1/2 in)
- Weight: 96 kg (212 lb; 15 st 2 lb)
- School: Paarl Boys' High School

Rugby union career
- Position(s): Fullback, Wing, Centre
Youth career
- 2008: Boland Cavaliers
Amateur team(s)
Years	Team	Apps	(Points)
2010	NWU Pukke	4	(10)
Senior career
Years	Team	Apps	(Points)
2010	Leopards	2	(17)
2011–2013	Eastern Province Kings	36	(98)
2013	Southern Kings	10	(0)
2013–2015	Sharks (Currie Cup)	24	(41)
2014–2015	Sharks	27	(8)
2016	Bulls	11	(10)
2017–2019	Stormers	29	(178)
2017–2019	Western Province	16	(207)
2020–2024	Canon Eagles	48	(210)
- Correct as of 20 February 2020
International career
Years	Team	Apps	(Points)
2011	South African Kings	3	(0)
- Correct as of 18 April 2018

Sarel Petrus Marais (born 16 March 1989) is a South African professional rugby union player for the Stormers in Super Rugby and Western Province in the Currie Cup. His position he plays is Fullback.

== Career ==
=== Youth and Varsity rugby ===
Marais played for the Boland Cavaliers in youth competitions and was part of the 2009 Vodacom Cup squad, without making a senior appearance. He then moved to Potchefstroom in 2010, where he played four matches for the NWU Pukke in the 2010 Varsity Cup competition.

Marais also played for the Leopards U21 team during the 2010 Under-21 competition.

=== Leopards ===
Although Marais didn't play any games for the Leopards during the 2010 Currie Cup season, he made his first class debut in the Leopards' first relegation play-off match against the SWD Eagles, scoring his first try within a minute of his debut when he came on as a first-half blood replacement and a second try right before the end of the match. He maintained his try-scoring exploits in the following match, scoring another try in the return leg to help keep the Leopards in the 2011 Currie Cup Premier Division.

=== Kings ===
It was then announced that he moved to the Eastern Province Kings for the 2011 Currie Cup First Division season. He remained with them for three seasons, making 36 appearances for them in the Currie Cup and Vodacom Cup competitions in 2011 and 2012. He reached the top ten in the scoring charts for the 2011 Currie Cup First Division, scoring ten tries and two conversions during the season. He firmly established himself as the first choice full-back, starting fifteen of their sixteen matches in the 2012 Currie Cup First Division season and also started their match in the First Division final, which the Kings won 26–25 to win their second First Division title in three seasons.

In 2013, Marais was also named in the Southern Kings squad for the 2013 Super Rugby season. He made his Super Rugby debut for the Kings in their first ever Super Rugby match, a 22–10 victory over Australian side the Force in Port Elizabeth. After starting the first three matches of the season, he missed the next seven due to a knee injury. He returned to make a further five appearances, as well as playing in both legs of the Kings' Super Rugby promotion/relegation play-offs against the Lions, which saw the Kings lose their Super Rugby status.

=== Sharks ===
Marais joined the exodus of players leaving the Kings after their defeat to the Lions, joining Durban-based side the Sharks for the 2013 Currie Cup Premier Division season. He made his debut in their second match of the season against the Golden Lions and immediately established himself as their first-choice full-back, starting all the remaining games of the season, scoring four tries. He was also in the starting fifteen for the Currie Cup final, which the Sharks won 33–19 against Western Province.

Marais was included in the Sharks squad for the 2014 Super Rugby season and made his Sharks Super Rugby debut in a 31–16 victory against the Bulls in Durban.

=== Return to Kings ===
At the end of 2015, Marais was one of a number of players that joined the Southern Kings prior to their return to Super Rugby for the 2016 season. However, the Eastern Province Kings – the provincial union that was supposed to administer the Super Rugby team – suffered serious financial problems and the South African Rugby Union stepped in to assist the Super Rugby franchise; however, Marais was not one of the players contracted by SARU to represent the Southern Kings. After being unpaid for several months, he was one of eighteen players involved in submitting an application to get Eastern Province Rugby liquidated in an attempt to recoup unpaid salary payments.

=== Bulls ===
Shortly after the 2016 Super Rugby season kicked off, Marais joined the Pretoria-based Bulls on a two-month trial basis. He made his Bulls debut by replacing Burger Odendaal during their 23–18 win against the Cheetahs in Round Six. He was named in their starting line-up for their next match, against Marais' former side the Southern Kings in Port Elizabeth.

== Stormers / Western Province ==
At the start of 2017, Marais moved to Cape Town, where he joined the Stormers Super Rugby team and the Western Province Currie Cup team.
