= Rynardt van Wyk =

South African rugby union player

- Full name: Rynardt Ian van Wyk
- Born: 6 March 1991 (age 35) Rustenburg, South Africa
- Height: 1.89 m (6 ft 2 1/2 in)
- Weight: 107 kg (16 st 12 lb; 236 lb)
- School: Hans Merensky High School, Tzaneen
- University: Zululand Rugby Academy

Rugby union career
- Position: Flanker / Number Eight
- Current team: Trélissac
Youth career
- 2007–2009: Limpopo Blue Bulls
- 2010: Sharks
- 2011–2012: Border Bulldogs
Amateur team(s)
| Years | Team | Apps | (Points) |
| 2014 | UJ | 1 | (0) |
Senior career
| Years | Team | Apps | (Points) |
| 2012–2014 | Border Bulldogs | 38 | (40) |
| 2015–2016 | Mâcon | 17 | (5) |
| 2016 | Saint Nazaire | 5 | (0) |
| 2017–2018 | Valence d'Agen | 29 | (30) |
| 2018–2019 | Massy | 3 | (0) |
| 2019 | Eastern Province Elephants | 5 | (10) |
- Correct as of 4 May 2019

Rynardt Ian van Wyk (born 6 March 1991 in Rustenburg, South Africa) is a South African rugby union player for French Fédérale 1 side Trélissac. His regular position is flanker or number eight.

== Career ==
=== Youth and Varsity Cup rugby ===
As a scholar at Merensky High School in Tzaneen, Van Wyk was selected in the Limpopo Blue Bulls Under-16 squad for the Grant Khomo Week competition in 2007 and for their Under-18 Craven Week squad in 2009.

In 2010, he joined the Zululand Rugby Academy and played for the Sharks U19 side in the 2010 Under-19 Provincial Championship, making twelve appearances. In 2011, the Zululand Rugby Academy relocated to East London and became part of the Border Bulldogs. Van Wyk was one of the players that made this move and he represented the Border U21 side in the 2011 and 2012 Under-21 Provincial Championships.

He also made one appearance for Johannesburg-based university side UJ in the 2014 Varsity Cup competition.

=== Border Bulldogs ===
He made his first class debut during the 2012 Vodacom Cup competition, playing against former side the Sharks XV and ended up on the wrong end of a 42–0 defeat. He scored his first senior try in their match against the Western Province in East London and made a total of six appearances.

After reverting to the Border U21 side for the latter half of the 2012 season, he returned to the first team for the 2013 Vodacom Cup, making seven appearances. His Currie Cup debut came during the 2013 Currie Cup First Division season, playing off the bench in their 36–12 defeat to the SWD Eagles. After two more substitute appearances, he started his first match for the Bulldogs in a 22–20 win over the Griffons in East London. He remained in the first team for the remainder of the campaign, starting a further ten matches.

He started all six matches of the Border Bulldogs' 2014 Currie Cup qualification campaign as finished bottom of the log to earn a place in the 2014 Currie Cup First Division competition.
