= Chevandré van Schoor =

South African rugby union player

- Full name: Chevandré Conwin van Schoor
- Born: 28 September 1992 (age 34) Paarl, South Africa
- School: Klein Nederburg Senior Sekondêre Skool, Paarl

Rugby union career
- Position: Centre / Winger
Youth career
- 2010: Boland Cavaliers
- 2011: Griffons
- 2013: Western Province
Amateur team(s)
Years	Team	Apps	(Points)
2015–present	Durbanville-Bellville	0	(0)
Senior career
Years	Team	Apps	(Points)
2014	Western Province	2	(0)
2014	→ Boland Cavaliers	3	(0)
2021	Eastern Province Elephants	4	(0)
- Correct as of 27 March 2022

Chevandré Conwin van Schoor (born 28 September 1992 in Paarl, South Africa) is a South African rugby union player, who most recently played first class rugby with Western Province. He can play as a centre or a winger.

== Career ==
=== Youth ===
At high school level, Van Schoor was selected in the Boland Cavaliers side that played at the 2010 Under-18 Craven Week tournament in Welkom. Van Schoor played in two matches and scored a try against KwaZulu-Natal. He also started two matches for the Boland U19 side during the 2010 Under-19 Provincial Championship.

In 2011, he moved to Welkom to join the Griffons. He played some rugby for Harmony Sports Academy and then made appearances in all eight of the Griffons U19 side's fixtures in Division B of the 2011 Under-19 Provincial Championship, helping his side win the title by beating Border U19 in the final.

He returned to the Western Cape in 2012 where he played some club rugby in the Western Province Super League A before he represented Western Province at the 2012 7s Premier League in George. He was named in the 2013 Vodacom Cup squad, but failed to make an appearance. He also played one match for the Western Province U21 side that won the 2013 Under-21 Provincial Championship.

=== Western Province ===
He was once again included in Western Province's Vodacom Cup side for the 2014 tournament. He made his first class debut against the Free State XV in Cape Town, coming on as a late substitute in a 28–15 win. His first senior start came a fortnight later in their match against SWD Eagles in George.

He was named in Western Province's Currie Cup squad for the first time prior to the 2014 Currie Cup Premier Division. However, he joined near-neighbours Boland Cavaliers on loan for their 2014 Currie Cup First Division campaign (see below). Upon his return from Wellington, Van Schoor was named in the Western Province squad for their final match of the regular season against the Sharks.

=== Boland Cavaliers ===
He played in his first ever Currie Cup match in Boland Cavaliers' 32–25 defeat to the Falcons and made two more appearances from the bench during the competition.
