= Thomas Lawson (rugby union) =

England international rugby union player

- Full name: Thomas Mattocks Lawson
- Born: 1 September 1900 Cockermouth, England
- Died: 21 October 1951 (aged 51) Cockermouth, England
- School: St Bees School
- Notable relative: Richard Lawson (brother)
- Occupation: Engineer

Rugby union career
- Position: Wing-forward
International career
Years	Team	Apps	(Points)
1928	England	2	(0)

Thomas Mattocks Lawson (1 September 1900 – 21 October 1951) was an English international rugby union player.

Lawson was a Workington and Cumberland player, capped twice for England as a wing-forward in 1928. There was some suggestion that his selection was a mistake and it was brother Richard they had intended to call up.

After retiring in 1928 due to injury, Lawson became a referee for two years before making a comeback for Workington, only to sidelined again when he broke both his hands in a car accident.

== See also ==
- List of England national rugby union players
