= Reg Muller =

South African rugby union player

- Full name: Reg-Hack Muller
- Born: 6 March 1986 (age 40) Johannesburg, South Africa
- Height: 1.87 m (6 ft 1 1/2 in)
- Weight: 105 kg (16 st 7 lb; 231 lb)
- School: Marais Viljoen High School, Alberton

Rugby union career
- Position: Flanker / Number eight
Youth career
- 2004: Golden Lions
- 2005–2007: Sharks
Senior career
Years	Team	Apps	(Points)
2007	Natal Wildebeest	3	(0)
2008–2014	Falcons	72	(130)
2014–2015	Mâcon		
2015–2017	Falcons	30	(45)
- Correct as of 2 June 2018
International career
Years	Team	Apps	(Points)
2009	South Africa Sevens	0	(0)
- Correct as of 26 August 2015

Reg-Hack Muller (born 6 March 1986) is a South African professional rugby union player who most recently played with the Falcons. His regular position is flanker or eighth man.

== Career ==
=== Youth / Sharks ===
In 2004, Muller represented the Golden Lions at the premier high school rugby union competition in South Africa, the Under-18 Craven Week held in Nelspruit.

After finishing high school, Muller moved to Durban to join the Sharks Academy. He played for both the Sharks U19s and the Sharks U21s in the respective Provincial Championships in 2005 and for the Under-21s in 2006 (as well as Sevens.

In 2007, Muller made his first class debut for the Sharks' Vodacom Cup side, known as the Natal Wildebeest. He came on in the final minute of their match against the Free State Cheetahs in a 24–21 victory. After another appearance off the bench in their 13–19 loss to Western Province the following week, he started his first senior match, away to the Mighty Elephants in Port Elizabeth, where his side suffered a 45–0 loss. They eventually finished in fifth position and missed out on a quarter final spot. Muller returned to action for the Sharks U21s in the 2007 Under-21 Provincial Championship later in the year.

=== Falcons ===
In 2008, Muller returned to Gauteng, joining the East Rand-based Falcons. He made his debut for them in the 2008 Vodacom Cup competition in a 33–36 defeat to the Free State Cheetahs and his first start a week later against Western Province. In his fourth appearance for the Falcons, Muller scored his first try for the side; he scored in the final minutes of the match in Uniondale, with the Falcons eventually winning the match 27–26. He scored another try in his second start for the Falcons against the Mighty Elephants in Port Elizabeth, as his side finished in fifth spot on the Northern Section log.

Muller also made his Currie Cup debut in the same year. He came on as a replacement in their opening match of the 2008 Currie Cup Premier Division competition as they suffered a 42–48 defeat to the Boland Cavaliers in Brakpan. He made a total of four starts and four appearances off the bench in their 14-match season, scoring one try in their return match against the Boland Cavaliers in Wellington. It was a disappointing season for the Falcons as they finished last on the log, requiring them to play in a relegation play-off series against the Leopards to retain their Premier Division status. However, they lost both legs of the play-offs series – 24–29 and 19–27 respectively, with Muller starting both matches – to be relegated to the First Division for 2009.

Muller started five matches for the Falcons in the 2009 Vodacom Cup competition, scoring tries against the Griffons and Golden Lions as they finished bottom of the Northern Section, having won just one match against the Pumas in the competition. Muller featured in a Compulsory Friendly match against Griquas ahead of the 2009 Currie Cup First Division, which saw the Falcons lose all ten of their matches to finish bottom of the log. Despite the poor results, Muller was one of the best players during the Falcons' season, scoring six tries in six appearances – the joint-highest by a Falcons player. This included a hat-trick in their 15–47 defeat to the SWD Eagles in George as he scored all the Falcons' points in the match.

Muller made six appearances as the Falcons again lost all their matches in the 2010 Vodacom Cup and a further five in the 2010 Currie Cup First Division. He scored two tries in their match against the Border Bulldogs in East London, which proved crucial in a 38–37 victory, their only success in the competition.

Muller again scored two tries against the Border Bulldogs in East London during the 2011 Vodacom Cup, helping his side to a 43–15 victory as the Falcons eventually finished in sixth spot on the log, with two victories and a draw. Muller scored a try in a 28–25 Compulsory Friendly match victory over the Golden Lions and a further five in eight appearances in the 2011 Currie Cup First Division as their much-improved form saw them finish in third place on the log to qualify for the semi-finals. Three of his five tries once again came against the Border Bulldogs in a 57–42 victory, while he scored a brace in their 53–45 win against the SWD Eagles. Muller didn't feature in the semi-finals, however, as the Falcons lost to the Eastern Province Kings.

Muller played in all six of the Falcons' matches in the 2012 Vodacom Cup competition (as they finished bottom with one win against the Leopards) before emulating his try-scoring record from 2011, scoring five tries in the 2012 Currie Cup First Division; he got two tries in their 38–36 victory over the Border Bulldogs, one in their match against the Griffons in Kempton Park and one in each of their meetings against the Eastern Province Kings to make a total of eleven appearances to help the Falcons finish in seventh spot.

Muller made a single appearance for the Falcons in the 2013 Vodacom Cup in a 27–22 victory over the Golden Lions.

=== Mâcon ===
Muller joined French Fédérale 1 side Mâcon for the 2014–2015 Fédérale 1 season.

=== Return to Falcons ===
Muller returned to the Falcons in 2015 and was named in their squad for the 2015 Currie Cup First Division.

=== Sevens ===
Muller also played Sevens rugby; he represented the Sharks Sevens team in 2006 and 2007 and also represented the South Africa Sevens side in the Namibia Sevens tournament in 2009. He was a member of the Kaizer Chiefs side that played at the 7s Premier League in 2013 and played for the Samurai Sevens and the Golden Lions Sevens teams in 2014.

== Statistics ==
As of the start of the 2015 Currie Cup First Division.

First class career
Season	Teams	Currie Cup		Vodacom Cup		Other		Total	
Season	Teams	Apps	Pts	Apps	Pts	Apps	Pts	Apps	Pts
2007	Natal Wildebeest	—	—	3	0	—	—	3	0
2008	Falcons	8	5	6	10	2	0	16	15
2009	Falcons	6	30	5	10	1	0	12	40
2010	Falcons	5	10	6	0	1	0	12	10
2011	Falcons	8	25	5	10	1	5	14	40
2012	Falcons	11	25	6	0	—	—	17	25
2013	Falcons	—	—	1	0	—	—	1	0
Total		38	95	32	30	5	5	75	130
