= Richard Lawson =

Richard Lawson may refer to:

- Richard Lawson (actor) (born 1947), American actor
- Richard Lawson (British Army officer) (1927–2023), served as General Officer Commanding in Northern Ireland
- Richard Lawson (politician) (born 1946), environmentalist and politician in England
- Richard Lawson (rugby union, born 1898) (1898–1961), English rugby union player
- Richard Lawson (rugby union, born 1986), South African rugby union player
- Richard Lawson (speedway rider) (born 1986), British speedway rider
- Richard Lawson (activist), far right activist in the United Kingdom
- Richard Lawson (professor) (1875–1971), New Zealand teacher
- Richard Lawson (writer) (born 1982/1983), American novelist and culture critic
- Richard L. Lawson (1929–2020), United States Air Force general
- Richard T. Lawson, Episcopal bishop-elect
- Richard Lawson of High Riggs (c. 1450–1507), three times Lord Provost of Edinburgh
- Rick Lawson (born 1973), singer
- Ricky Lawson (1954–2013), drummer and composer
