= Carel du Preez =

South African rugby union player

- Full name: Hermanus Carel du Preez
- Born: 30 April 1993 (age 33) Hartswater, South Africa
- Height: 1.98 m (6 ft 6 in)
- Weight: 111 kg (17 st 7 lb; 245 lb)
- School: Hoër Landbouskool Noord-Kaapland, Jan Kempdorp
- University: Stellenbosch Rugby Academy

Rugby union career
- Position(s): Number eight, Flanker, Lock
- Current team: Enisei-STM
Youth career
- 2013–2014: Western Province
Amateur team(s)
Years	Team	Apps	(Points)
2013	Durbanville-Bellville	5	(15)
Senior career
Years	Team	Apps	(Points)
2013–2014	Western Province	10	(10)
2019	Pumas	12	(10)
2020–2025	Enisei-STM	59	(160)
- Correct as of 22 October 2022
International career
Years	Team	Apps	(Points)
2015–2016	South Africa Sevens	21	(5)
- Correct as of 28 August 2020

Hermanus Carel du Preez (born 30 April 1993 in Hartswater, South Africa) is a South African rugby union player for the Enisei-STM in the Rugby Premier League. He can play as a number eight, a flanker or a lock.

== Career ==
=== Youth and Amateur rugby ===
Du Preez enrolled at the Stellenbosch Rugby Academy, where he earned a spot in the Western Province Amateur side.

In 2013, he represented his club side Durbanville-Bellville at the inaugural SARU Community Cup competition, helping them to win the Bowl Final, effectively finishing third. He scored three tries in the competition, including a brace in his side's 95–20 victory over Bloemfontein Police.

At the end of 2013, he represented Western Province U21 in the 2013 Under-21 Provincial Championship. He made seven appearances and scored two tries as he helped the side clinch the title.

=== Western Province ===
He was included in the Western Province Vodacom Cup side for the 2013 Vodacom Cup competition. He made his first class debut on 9 March 2013, playing off the bench in a 17–17 draw against neighbours Boland Cavaliers. He was involved in the 2013 SARU Community Cup for the next few weeks, but returned to the side – and into the starting line-up for the first time – for their match against Argentinean side Pampas XV.

After one more appearance in 2013, he returned to the side for the 2014 Vodacom Cup competition. He made seven appearances for the side and scored his first senior try against Kenyan side Simba XV just before half-time ... and his second try just after half-time.

=== Sevens ===
Du Preez also played some sevens rugby; in 2012, he was part of a Samurai Sevens side that won the 2012 7s Premier League in George and he was also a member of the Western Province side that played at the 2013 World Club 7s in London, in the inaugural edition of the competition.

He joined the South Africa Sevens Academy in 2014. He received a call-up to the senior South Africa Sevens team for the first time prior to the 2015 Japan Sevens as an injury replacement for Philip Snyman.
