= Dwayne Kelly =

South African rugby union player

- Born: 19 October 1991 (age 35) Bloemfontein, South Africa
- Height: 1.80 m (5 ft 11 in)
- Weight: 88 kg (194 lb; 13 st 12 lb)
- School: Westville Boys' High School
- University: Nelson Mandela Metropolitan University

Rugby union career
- Position: Scrum-half
Youth career
- 2005–2006: Blue Bulls
- 2007–2011: Sharks
- 2011–2012: Eastern Province Kings
Amateur team(s)
Years	Team	Apps	(Points)
2013	NMMU Madibaz	8	(0)
Senior career
Years	Team	Apps	(Points)
2013–2014	Eastern Province Kings	18	(7)
2014–2015	SWD Eagles	17	(40)
2015	Eastern Province Kings	6	(0)
- Correct as of 9 October 2015
International career
Years	Team	Apps	(Points)
2013	South African Universities	1	(0)
- Correct as of 8 May 2013

Dwayne Kelly (born 19 October 1991) is a South African professional rugby union player, who most recently played with the Eastern Province Kings in the domestic Currie Cup and Vodacom Cup competitions. His regular position is scrum-half.

== Career ==
=== Youth rugby ===
Kelly represented the Blue Bulls Under-13 and Under-14 sides in 2005 and 2006. After he relocated to KwaZulu-Natal in 2006, he represented the Under-16 Natal Wildebeest in 2007, as well as the KZN Under-18 Academy team.

Kelly captained the Westville Boys' High School first XV rugby team while he was in his matric year and made six starts for the Sharks U19 team in the 2010 Under-19 Provincial Championship. He also played for and captained the senior Sharks Sevens team in 2011.

=== Eastern Province Kings / NMMU Madibaz ===
In May 2012, he joined the Port Elizabeth-based Eastern Province Kings, appearing for their Under-21 team in the 2012 Under-21 Provincial Championship. He made two appearances off the bench during the regular season, but started in both their semi-final – scoring 18 of his side's points in a 67–5 victory over Griquas U21 – and the final, where he helped Eastern Province win the competition by beating SWD U21 24–10 in Port Elizabeth. He also started their promotion play-off match against Border U21, but could not prevent the side lose 15–21 to remain in Group B for 2013.

Kelly represented Port Elizabeth-based university side NMMU Madibaz during the 2013 Varsity Cup; he was their first-choice scrum-half for the campaign, starting all eight of their matches as he helped NMMU Madibaz qualify for the semi-final of the competition for the first time in their history. NMMU Madibaz lost the semi-final 15–16 to Maties, with Kelly spending ten minutes in the sin-bin during the match. His performances in the competition were noted by the South African Universities selectors and he was included in their team that a match against Namibia in May 2013.

Shortly after the Varsity Cup season ended, he was also included in the Eastern Province Kings squad for the 2013 Vodacom Cup competition and he made his first class debut by playing off the bench in their match against the Boland Cavaliers in Malmesbury in the final round of the regular season, helping his side to a 27–23 victory. He also played for them in the semi-final against the Pumas, but ended on the losing side again as the team from Nelspruit ran out 39–13 winners.

Kelly made his first appearance in the Currie Cup competition in the opening fixture of the 2013 Currie Cup First Division, when he started the match against the Pumas. He made a total of five starts and five substitute appearances during the competition, helping them to second spot on the log. He started both their semi-final victory against the Leopards, which finished 32–29 after extra time, and the final, where they lost 30–53 to the Pumas to finish the competition as runners-up.

Kelly returned to Vodacom Cup action for the EP Kings during the 2014 Vodacom Cup and he scored his first points at senior level in their match against the Border Bulldogs in Grahamstown, scoring a try just before half-time to help his side to a 60–6 victory; he also kicked a late conversion in the same match. He made six appearances during the competition, but could not help them reach the quarter-finals, finishing in fifth spot on the Southern Section log.

=== SWD Eagles ===
In May 2014, it was announced that Kelly joined George-based side SWD Eagles for the 2014 and 2015 seasons.

Kelly played in all six of their matches during the 2014 Currie Cup qualification series, scoring tries in four consecutive matches at the start of the competition against the Griffons, Falcons, Boland Cavaliers and Border Bulldogs. It wasn't enough to help SWD finish top of the log and earn a spot in the 2014 Currie Cup Premier Division, instead remaining in the First Division. He started all five of their matches during the regular season of that competition to help his side finish third on the log. He scored one try in their match against the Border Bulldogs and a brace against the Griffons in a 42–27 victory in their final match of the regular season to qualify for the semi-finals. However, SWD couldn't beat the Griffons in the semi-finals, with the side from Welkom winning that match 45–43 (and subsequently becoming champions).

Kelly missed the opening three rounds of the 2015 Vodacom Cup, but returned to start all their remaining five matches in the competition. He scored a try in their 31–10 victory over former side the Eastern Province Kings to help the SWD Eagles finish in fourth spot on the log to qualify for the quarter-finals. They were knocked out at the quarter-final stage for the second year in a row, losing 21–29 to the Golden Lions in Johannesburg.

=== Return to the Eastern Province Kings ===
After spending a year in George, Kelly returned to Port Elizabeth to rejoin the Eastern Province Kings prior to the 2015 Currie Cup Premier Division. He made his debut in the Premier Division of the Currie Cup in the EP Kings' 20–24 defeat by the Sharks, playing off the bench for the final few minutes of the match. He was then promoted to the starting line-up for their following match, a 21–37 loss to the Golden Lions in Johannesburg.

== Statistics ==
As of 9 September 2015.

First class career
Season	Teams	Super Rugby		Currie Cup		Vodacom Cup		Other		Total	
Season	Teams	Apps	Pts	Apps	Pts	Apps	Pts	Apps	Pts	Apps	Pts
2013	Eastern Province Kings	—	—	10	0	2	0	—	—	12	0
2013	South African Universities	—	—	—	—	—	—	1	0	1	0
2014	Eastern Province Kings	—	—	—	—	6	7	—	—	6	7
2014	SWD Eagles	—	—	12	35	—	—	—	—	12	35
2015	SWD Eagles	—	—	—	—	5	5	—	—	5	5
2015	Eastern Province Kings	—	—	2	0	—	—	—	—	2	0
Eastern Province Kings Total		—	—	12	0	8	7	—	—	20	7
SWD Eagles Total		—	—	12	35	5	5	—	—	17	40
S.A. Universities Total		—	—	—	—	—	—	1	0	1	0
Career Total		—	—	24	35	13	12	1	0	38	47
