= Richard Lawson (rugby union, born 1898) =

England international rugby union player

- Full name: Richard Gordon Lawson
- Born: 8 October 1898 Cockermouth, England
- Died: 3 January 1961 (aged 62) Workington, England
- School: St Bees School
- University: Thomas Lawson (brother)

Rugby union career
- Position: Back row
International career
Years	Team	Apps	(Points)
1925	England	1	(0)

Richard Gordon Lawson (8 October 1898 – 3 January 1961) was an English international rugby union player.

Lawson was born in Cockermouth and educated at St Bees School.

A forward, Lawson was the elder brother of rugby player Thomas Lawson, with whom he featured in the back row of the scrum in matches for Workington and Cumberland.

Lawson gained his solitary England cap against Ireland at Twickenham in the 1925 Five Nations.

== See also ==
- List of England national rugby union players
