= 7s Premier League =

Rugby union sevens competition in South Africa

- Current season, competition or edition: 2013 7s Premier League
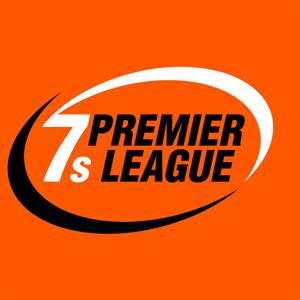
- 7s Premier League logo
- Sport: Rugby union
- First season: 2012
- No. of teams: 12
- Country: South Africa
- Venues: Outeniqua Park, George
- Most recent champion: Samurai Sevens
- Most titles: 1
- Sponsor: NBM Group
- Website: http://www.sevenspremierleague.co.za

The 7s Premier League (known as the NBM 7s Premier League for sponsorship reasons) was an annual rugby union sevens competition in South Africa. It was organised by the South Western Districts Rugby Union and was contested in December at Outeniqua Park, George and was an attempt to emulate the Indian Premier League cricket tournament.

== Teams ==
The following teams took part in the 7s Premier League competitions to date:

7s Premier League teams
Team Name	2012	2013
Blue Bulls	6th	—N/a
Boland Cavaliers	8th	—N/a
Eye of the Tiger	—N/a	10th
Free State Cheetahs	2nd	11th (joint)
Kaizer Chiefs	7th	7th (joint)
Kenya Shujaa	—N/a	3rd
Leopards	—N/a	9th (Bowl Winners)
Lions	9th (Bowl Winners)	—N/a
Living Ball	5th (Plate Winners)	5th (Plate Winners)
Masakhane Old Boys	—N/a	11th (joint)
Mighty Mohicans	12th	—N/a
Sharks	4th	6th
NBM All Stars	3rd	—N/a
Samurai Sevens	1st (Cup Winners)	1st (Cup Winners)
SWD Eagles	—N/a	4th
Unlimited Titans	—N/a	2nd
Vikings	11th	—N/a
Western Province	10th	7th (joint)
