= Renier Schoeman (rugby union) =

South African rugby union player

- Full name: Renier Schoeman
- Born: 27 May 1983 (age 43) Potgietersrus, South Africa
- Height: 1.91 m (6 ft 3 in)
- Weight: 134 kg (21 st 1 lb; 295 lb)
- School: Ben Viljoen
- University: NWU Pukke

Rugby union career
- Position: Prop
- Current team: Border Bulldogs
Senior career
| Years | Team | Apps | (Points) |
| 2005 | Pumas | 3 | (0) |
| 2006–2008 | Leopards | 7 | (0) |
| 2007 | → Griquas | 2 | (0) |
| 2009 | SWD Eagles | 6 | (0) |
| 2010–present | Border Bulldogs | 41 | (0) |
- Correct as of 26 April 2014

Renier "Walla" Schoeman (born 27 May 1983) is a South African rugby union player, currently playing with the Border Bulldogs. His regular position is prop.

== Career ==
Between 2005 and 2009, Schoeman played for four different teams – the Pumas, Leopards, Griquas and SWD Eagles, but failed to break into any of those teams, making a total of just 18 appearances in 5 years. In 2010, he joined the Border Bulldogs and finally established himself as a first-team regular, making 15 appearances in his debut season in the 2011 Vodacom Cup and 2011 Currie Cup First Division competitions.
