= Thembani Mkokeli =

South African rugby union player

- Full name: Thembani Moeren Mkokeli
- Born: 12 March 1984 (age 42) East London, South Africa
- Height: 1.79 m (5 ft 10 1/2 in)
- Weight: 77 kg (12 st 2 lb; 170 lb)
- School: Msobomvu High School, Butterworth
- University: Damelin College

Rugby union career
- Position: Fly-half / Fullback
- Current team: Border Bulldogs
Youth career
- 2000–2004: Border Bulldogs
Senior career
| Years | Team | Apps | (Points) |
| 2003–present | Border Bulldogs | 120 | (93) |
- Correct as of 22 July 2016
International career
| Years | Team | Apps | (Points) |
| 2001–2002 | S.A. Schools | | |
| 2003 | South Africa Under-19 | | |
- Correct as of 10 May 2015

Thembani Moeren Mkokeli (born 12 March 1984 in East London, South Africa) is a South African rugby union player, currently playing with the Border Bulldogs. He is a utility back that predominantly play as a fly-half or fullback, but also occasionally as a winger or centre.

== Career ==
=== Youth ===
Mkokeli played for the Border Bulldogs side at the 2000 Under-18 Craven Week tournament in Port Elizabeth. He played for the Border U19 side in 2001 (as a 17-year-old) and 2002 and earned a call-up to the South African Schools sides in the same seasons. In 2002, he was also named in the South African Under-19 side that played in the 2002 Under 19 Rugby World Championship in Italy and was once again included in the team for the 2003 tournament in Paris, from which the team returned victorious, their first win since 1994.

=== Border Bulldogs ===
Upon his return from the Under-19 Rugby World Championship, Mkokeli was also included in the senior squad for the first time and made his first team debut in the 2003 Currie Cup against the Leopards in Potchefstroom. He quickly established himself as a regular for the Bulldogs and became a regular fixture in the Border Bulldogs side over the next decade.

During the 2014 Currie Cup qualification series, Mkokeli reached a personal milestone by playing in his hundredth first class match for the Border Bulldogs.
