= Johnathan Francke =

South African rugby union player

- Full name: Johnathan Charles Francke
- Born: 17 May 1986 (age 40) Strand, South Africa
- Height: 1.80 m (5 ft 11 in)
- Weight: 92 kg (14 st 7 lb; 203 lb)
- School: Strand Secondary
- University: Boland College

Rugby union career
- Position: Centre
- Current team: Griquas
Youth career
- 2007: Western Province
Amateur team(s)
Years	Team	Apps	(Points)
2008–2010	Maties	8	(10)
Senior career
Years	Team	Apps	(Points)
2011–2013	Boland Cavaliers	55	(80)
2013–present	Griquas	99	(75)
- Correct as of 10 July 2022
International career
Years	Team	Apps	(Points)
2007	South Africa Students	0	(0)
- Correct as of 8 October 2013

Johnathan Charles Francke (born 17 May 1986) is a South African rugby union player for Griquas in the Currie Cup and in the Rugby Challenge. His regular position is outside centre.

== Career ==
=== Youth and Varsity rugby ===
In 2007, Francke played for the Western Province U19 team. He was then included in the Maties Varsity Cup squads in 2008 (without making an appearance), 2009 (where he made one start in their match against the TUT Vikings) and 2010, when he established himself as a first team player, making seven appearances and scoring two tries.

=== Boland Cavaliers ===
Francke then joined Wellington-based side Boland Cavaliers. His first class debut came during their 2011 Vodacom Cup match against Griquas in Bredasdorp, also scoring a try a mere seven minutes after coming on. Four more tries followed in six appearances for the remainder of that competition. He was also involved in their Currie Cup squad straight away, playing in a compulsory friendly match against Western Province prior to the 2011 Currie Cup First Division (again marking his debut at this level with a try) and made his debut in the competition proper a few weeks later in a 69–12 victory against the Border Bulldogs.

Francke remained a regular for the team – mostly as a substitute – that season, helping the Boland Cavaliers to the First Division title, beating the Eastern Province Kings 43–12 in the final. He made several more appearances for them in both the Vodacom Cup and Currie Cup competitions in 2012 and 2013, amassing over fifty appearances for the team.

=== Griquas ===
Francke signed a deal with Kimberley-based outfit Griquas for 2014. With the Boland Cavaliers' season already finished, he actually joined Griquas on loan for the final match of their 2013 Currie Cup Premier Division regular season, being named in their starting line-up for their match against the Golden Lions.

In July 2014, Francke extended his contract until the end of 2016.
