= Kyle Hendricks (rugby union) =

South African rugby union player (born 1986)

- Full name: Carlyle Hendricks
- Born: 12 December 1986 (age 39) Cape Town, South Africa
- Height: 1.74 m (5 ft 8 1/2 in)
- Weight: 80 kg (12 st 8 lb; 176 lb)
- School: Excelsior Secondary School, Cape Town

Rugby union career
- Position: Winger / Fullback
Senior career
Years	Team	Apps	(Points)
2009–2016	Falcons	102	(308)
- Correct as of 9 October 2016

Carlyle "Kyle" Hendricks (born 12 December 1986) is a South African rugby union player, who most recently played with the Falcons. His regular position is winger or fullback.

== Career ==
=== Falcons ===
Hendricks was included in the Falcons squad for the 2009 Vodacom Cup. He made his first class debut against the Blue Bulls on 28 March 2009, starting their match against Gauteng rivals, the Blue Bulls and also started their match against the other team from Gauteng, the Golden Lions, later during the same season.

He returned to the Vodacom Cup side during the 2010 season, starting four of their matches. He also scored two tries in the Falcons' match against Griquas, despite his side being on the wrong end of a 60–12 defeat. After playing in a compulsory friendly match prior to the 2010 Currie Cup First Division season against a Sharks Invitational XV in Nigel, he was also included in the squad for the competition proper. He debuted in their match against the Eastern Province Kings in Port Elizabeth, the first of eight starts during the competition. On two occasions he scored two tries during a match – against the Griffons in Kempton Park and against the Border Bulldogs on the final day of the season, ending the season with seven tries behind his name to finish joint-fourth overall on the try scoring list and second for the Falcons, behind fellow back Coert Cronjé.

Hendricks increased his points contribution the following season when he also took over the kicking duties. He scored 56 points in eight appearances for the Falcons in the 2011 Vodacom Cup, the tenth-highest in the competition and easily the Falcons' top scorer with Cronjé the next best points scorer with 20 points. He got a further 54 points during the 2011 Currie Cup First Division competition, scoring nine tries amongst his 54 points in 11 appearances.

Two tries in five appearances followed during the 2012 Vodacom Cup competition and he made just one appearance in the 2012 Currie Cup First Division season before an injury ruled him out for the remainder of the campaign. He returned during the 2013 Vodacom Cup, scoring one try in six starts before a haul of 32 points in fourteen appearances was not enough to prevent his side finishing bottom of the log during the 2013 Currie Cup First Division.
