= Ben Venter =

South African rugby union player

- Full name: Benjamin Christoffel Gerhardus Venter
- Born: 15 May 1987 (age 39) Johannesburg, South Africa
- Height: 1.96 m (6 ft 5 in)
- Weight: 121 kg (19 st 1 lb; 267 lb)
- School: Hoërskool Hennenman, Hennenman
- University: University of the Free State (2006); Northern Cape Urban FET College Marketing Management (2007–2008); Toulouse Business School, Toulouse, France, Honours degree in Business Management (2017 - 2018)

Rugby union career
- Position: Lock / Flanker
- Current team: Montauban
Youth career
- 2006–2008: Griquas
Senior career
Years	Team	Apps	(Points)
2010	Griquas	6	(0)
2010–2012	Border Bulldogs	43	(15)
2013–2014	Boland Cavaliers	31	(10)
2014–2015	Chambéry	10	(0)
2015	→ Bordeaux Bègles	5	(0)
2015–present	Montauban	15	(0)
- Correct as of 9 February 2016

Benjamin Christoffel Gerhardus Venter (born 15 May 1987 in Johannesburg, South Africa) is a South African rugby union player, currently playing with French Pro D2 side Montauban. His regular position is lock or flanker.

== Career ==
=== Youth ===
He represented the Griquas U19 side in the 2006 Under-19 Provincial Championship and the Griquas U21 side in the 2007 and 2008 Under-21 Provincial Championships. That Griquas U21 team won the Championships in both 2007 and 2008. Venter played most of his youth rugby on the Wing.

=== Griquas ===
Ben was part of the 2008 Currie Cup Premier Division squad and signed a senior professional contract with Griquas at the end of 2008. He was named in the Griquas senior professional squad for the 2009 Vodacom Cup and 2009 Currie Cup Premier Division competitions, but missed most of that season due to injury. Venter was also named in the Griquas senior professional squad for the 2010 Vodacom Cup and 2010 Currie Cup Premier Division competitions.

=== Border Bulldogs ===
Venter joined East London-based side Border Bulldogs later in 2010. He was included in their squad for the 2010 Currie Cup First Division season and, after playing in a compulsory friendly match against the Free State Cheetahs, he started nine of the Bulldogs' matches during the season, scoring one try against Boland Cavaliers, helping his side win the match 50–46.

He played in sixteen matches during the 2011 Vodacom Cup and 2011 Currie Cup First Division competitions, weighing in with one try in each competition. He had more game time in 2012, making eighteen appearances during the Vodacom Cup and Currie Cup competitions.

In May 2012, he was named in the South African Barbarians (South) squad that faced England during the 2012 England rugby union tour of South Africa,

=== Boland Cavaliers ===
At the end of 2012, Venter moved to Wellington-basedBoland Cavaliers. Venter featured prominently during the 2013 and 2014 Vodacom Cup and Currie Cup competitions.

=== Chambéry ===
Venter moved to France during 2014 to join Fédérale 1 side Chambéry prior to the 2014–2015 season.

=== Bordeaux Bègles ===
In January 2015, he joined Bordeaux Bègles in the French Top 14 as a Medical Joker.

=== Montauban ===
On 16 April 2015, Venter signed a permanent contract with French Pro D2 club Montauban for three seasons (2015 - 2018), prior to the 2015–2016 season.

Coaching

Venter suffered a career ending injury while playing for Montauban and his career was cut short at the end of 2016. He has since devoted himself to coaching.
