= Danwel Demas =

South African rugby union player

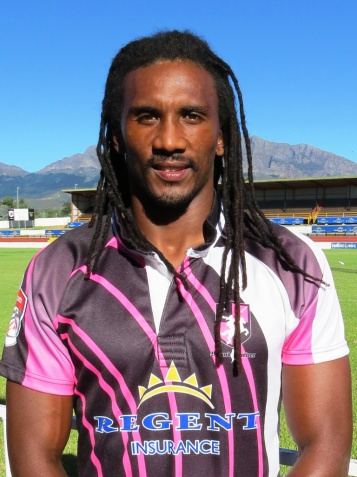
- Born: 15 October 1981 (age 45) Paarl, South Africa
- Height: 1.88 m (6 ft 2 in)
- Weight: 89 kg (196 lb; 14 st 0 lb)
- School: New Orleans High School, Paarl

Rugby union career
- Position: Wing
- Current team: Boland Cavaliers
Youth career
- 2002: Western Province
Amateur team(s)
Years	Team	Apps	(Points)
2015	Durbanville-Bellville	5	(5)
Senior career
Years	Team	Apps	(Points)
2004	Pumas	11	(10)
2005–2008	Blue Bulls	27	(40)
2006–2008	Bulls	4	(0)
2008	Boland Cavaliers	7	(25)
2009–2010	Free State Cheetahs	12	(15)
2009–2010	Cheetahs	21	(10)
2010	Free State XV	1	(0)
2010–2011	Aironi	15	(15)
2011	Boland Cavaliers	12	(80)
2012–2013	Pumas	8	(30)
2013	→ Griffons	2	(5)
2014–2017	Boland Cavaliers	46	(115)
- Correct as of 9 October 2016
International career
Years	Team	Apps	(Points)
2003–2007	South Africa Sevens		
2009	Emerging Springboks	1	(5)
2012	South African Barbarians	1	(0)
- Correct as of 26 April 2014

Danwel Demas (born 15 October 1981) is a South African rugby union player who most recently played for the Boland Cavaliers. He previously played for Italian club Aironi in the Pro12, and for the Bulls and Cheetahs in Super Rugby. He represented South Africa in sevens, in 2003 and from 2005 to 2007. In 2012, he joined the Pumas and represented them in the Vodacom Cup and the Currie Cup competitions until the end of 2013.

Demas also represented the Emerging Springboks from 2006 to 2009.

== Durbanville-Bellville ==
In 2015, he joined Western Province club side Durbanville-Bellville and was a member of the squad that won the 2015 SARU Community Cup competition, scoring one tries in five appearances in the competition.
