= Junior Bester =

South African rugby union player

- Full name: Alwyn Bester
- Born: 15 April 1987 (age 39) Vredendal, South Africa
- Height: 1.93 m (6 ft 4 in)
- Weight: 105 kg (16 st 7 lb; 231 lb)
- School: Boland Agricultural School, Paarl

Rugby union career
- Position: Loose-forward
- Current team: SWD Eagles
Youth career
- 2007–2008: Boland Cavaliers
Senior career
Years	Team	Apps	(Points)
2009	Boland Cavaliers	18	(10)
2010	Pumas	7	(5)
2011–2013	Boland Cavaliers	46	(40)
2014–present	SWD Eagles	30	(20)
- Correct as of 8 October 2015

Alwyn 'Junior' Bester (born 15 April 1987 in Vredendal) is a South African rugby union player, currently playing with the SWD Eagles. His regular position is flanker or number 8.

== Career ==
=== Youth ===
He came through the youth structures at Wellington-based side Boland Cavaliers and played for the Boland U21 side in 2007 and 2008.

=== Boland Cavaliers ===
He graduated to the senior side in 2009, being named in the 2009 Vodacom Cup squad. He made his debut in the first round of this competition, starting in an 18–43 loss to the Sharks XV. He started all six of Boland's matches in that competition and was also included in their Currie Cup squad for the 2009 Currie Cup Premier Division competition. He made his Currie Cup debut by starting in the first match of the season, a 26–18 victory over the Leopards. He made 11 appearances in total, as well as the second leg of their promotion/relegation series against the Pumas, a result that saw Boland relegated to the 2010 Currie Cup First Division.

=== Pumas ===
Bester remained in the Premier Division however, by joining the Pumas for the 2010 season. He didn't feature in the 2010 Vodacom Cup, but he did make his Pumas debut in their opening 2010 Currie Cup Premier Division match against the Blue Bulls. He made seven appearances in total for the Pumas, scoring one try.

=== Return to Boland Cavaliers ===
He remained with the Pumas for just one season before returning to former side Boland Cavaliers. He remained a regular in the team during his three-year spell there, making close to fifty appearances in the Vodacom Cup and Currie Cup competitions.

=== SWD Eagles ===
He left Boland for the second time after the conclusion of the 2013 Currie Cup First Division season though, joining near-rivals SWD Eagles prior to the 2014 season.
