= 2018–19 Southern Kings season =

Southern Kings
- 2018–19 season
- Head coach: Deon Davids
- Captain: Mike Willemse
- Stadium: Nelson Mandela Bay Stadium, NMU Stadium
- Conference B: 7th
- Record: Won 2, Drew 1, Lost 18
- Top try scorer: All: Bjorn Basson, Yaw Penxe (8)
- Top points scorer: All: Masixole Banda (115)

In the 2018–19 rugby union season, the Southern Kings participated in the 2018–19 Pro14 competition, their second appearance since joining the competition in 2017–18. They remained in Conference B of the competition, along with Irish sides Leinster and Ulster, Italian side Benetton, Scottish side Edinburgh and Welsh sides Dragons and Scarlets.

== Personnel ==
=== Coaches and management ===
The following coaching team was announced for the 2018–19 Pro14 season:

Name	Title
Deon Davids	Head coach
Chumani Booi	Backs Coach
Robbi Kempson	Scrum Consultant
Lermarc Stewart	Technical Analyst
Zingi Hela	Team Manager
Chumani Bambani	Media and Communications Manager
Gershwin Kortje	Team Doctor
Nadus Nieuwoudt	Strength and Conditioning Coach
Chad Foong	Assistant Strength and Conditioning Coach
Jodie Amy Emery	Physio
Yale Jameson	Physio
Henning van der Merwe	Kicking Coach
Sydney Goba	Logistics Manager

=== Squad ===
The Southern Kings squad for the 2018–19 Pro14 is:

2018–19 Southern Kings squad
Player	Position/s	Date of birth (age)	Pro14		Kings	
Player	Position/s	Date of birth (age)	Apps	Pts	Apps	Pts
(South Africa) JC Astle	Lock	30 August 1990 (aged 28)	–	–	–	–
(South Africa) Tango Balekile	Hooker	7 March 1996 (aged 22)	8	0	8	0
(South Africa) Masixole Banda	Fullback / Fly-half	11 June 1988 (aged 30)	15	40	15	40
(South Africa) Bjorn Basson	Wing	11 February 1987 (aged 31)	–	–	–	–
(South Africa) Ulrich Beyers	Fullback	22 January 1991 (aged 27)	15	12	–	–
(South Africa) Tristan Blewett	Centre	26 June 1996 (aged 22)	–	–	–	–
(South Africa) Michael Botha	Fullback	28 May 1997 (aged 21)	–	–	–	–
(South Africa) Brandon Brown	Flank	16 November 1994 (aged 23)	–	–	–	–
(South Africa) Tienie Burger	Flank	1 November 1993 (aged 24)	13	5	13	5
(South Africa) Rossouw de Klerk	Prop	21 August 1989 (aged 29)	26	5	12	0
(South Africa) Bobby de Wee	Lock	4 February 1994 (aged 24)	20	5	20	5
(South Africa) Stephan de Wit	Flank	1 January 1992 (aged 26)	–	–	–	–
(South Africa) Martin Dreyer	Prop	25 August 1988 (aged 30)	6	0	6	0
(South Africa) Ntabeni Dukisa	Utility back	25 July 1988 (aged 30)	8	26	8	26
(South Africa) Martin du Toit	Fly-half	27 June 1989 (aged 29)	11	9	11	9
(South Africa) Schalk Ferreira	Prop	9 February 1984 (aged 34)	20	5	20	5
(South Africa) Justin Forwood	Prop	19 September 1993 (aged 24)	3	0	3	0
(South Africa) Stephan Greeff	Lock	24 December 1989 (aged 28)	17	5	17	5
(South Africa) Berton Klaasen	Centre	24 January 1990 (aged 28)	20	20	20	20
(South Africa) Harlon Klaasen	Centre / Wing	13 August 1993 (aged 25)	9	20	9	20
(South Africa) Tertius Kruger	Centre	24 December 1989 (aged 28)	2	0	–	–
(South Africa) Ruaan Lerm	Number eight	25 March 1992 (aged 26)	14	10	14	10
(South Africa) Michael Makase	Wing	20 January 1990 (aged 28)	12	20	12	20
(South Africa) Godlen Masimla	Scrum-half	11 August 1992 (aged 26)	15	10	15	10
(South Africa) Lupumlo Mguca	Prop	25 April 1997 (aged 21)	–	–	–	–
(South Africa) Giant Mtyanda	Lock	19 March 1986 (aged 32)	8	0	8	0
(South Africa) Andisa Ntsila	Loose forward	7 November 1993 (aged 24)	17	10	17	10
(South Africa) Schalk Oelofse	Lock	2 November 1988 (aged 29)	–	–	–	–
(South Africa) NJ Oosthuizen	Prop	19 November 1996 (aged 21)	–	–	–	–
(South Africa) Yaw Penxe	Outside back	3 April 1997 (aged 21)	18	25	18	25
(South Africa) Bader Pretorius	Fly-half	16 May 1997 (aged 21)	–	–	–	–
(South Africa) Sarel Pretorius	Scrum-half	18 April 1984 (aged 34)	72	70	–	–
(South Africa) Luvuyo Pupuma	Prop	16 October 1992 (aged 25)	14	10	14	10
(Fiji) Meli Rokoua	Centre	24 July 1994 (aged 24)	–	–	–	–
(South Africa) Pieter Scholtz	Prop	20 March 1994 (aged 24)	11	0	11	0
(South Africa) S'bura Sithole	Wing	14 June 1990 (aged 28)	5	0	5	0
(South Africa) De-Jay Terblanche	Prop	25 June 1985 (aged 33)	–	–	–	–
(South Africa) Alulutho Tshakweni	Prop	26 September 1998 (aged 19)	–	–	–	–
(South Africa) Stefan Ungerer	Scrum-half	23 November 1993 (aged 24)	–	–	–	–
(South Africa) Ruan van Rensburg	Scrum-half	31 May 1993 (aged 25)	–	–	–	–
(South Africa) Alandré van Rooyen	Hooker	23 August 1996 (aged 22)	3	0	3	0
(South Africa) Rudi van Rooyen	Scrum-half	5 January 1992 (aged 26)	14	0	14	0
(Italy) Dries van Schalkwyk	Utility forward	21 December 1984 (aged 33)	88	105	12	5
(South Africa) Jurie van Vuuren	Flank	7 June 1993 (aged 25)	10	0	10	0
(South Africa) Kerron van Vuuren	Hooker	23 May 1995 (aged 23)	–	–	–	–
(South Africa) CJ Velleman	Flank	24 February 1995 (aged 23)	–	–	–	–
(South Africa) Xandré Vos	Prop	30 September 1996 (aged 21)	–	–	–	–
(South Africa) Mike Willemse	Hooker	14 February 1993 (aged 25)	13	10	13	10
(South Africa) Courtney Winnaar	Fullback	27 March 1997 (aged 21)	–	–	–	–
(South Africa) Oliver Zono	Fly-half	26 November 1991 (aged 26)	9	23	9	23
Note: Players' ages and statistics are correct as of 1 September 2018, the date of the opening round of the competition. Pro14 appearances only.

=== Player movements ===
Player movements between the 2017–18 Pro14 season and the end 2018–19 Pro14 season are as follows:

Southern Kings transfers 2017–18 — 2018–19
Pos	2017–18 squad	Out	In	2018–19 squad
PR	Rossouw de Klerk; Martin Dreyer; Schalk Ferreira; Justin Forwood; Njabulo Gumede; Mzamo Majola; Luvuyo Pupuma; Pieter Scholtz; Joe Smith; Piet-Louw Strauss; Entienne Swanepoel; Dayan van der Westhuizen	(substituted off) Njabulo Gumede (to Free State XV); (substituted off) Mzamo Majola (to Sharks); (substituted off) Joe Smith (to Leopards); (substituted off) Piet-Louw Strauss (to Maties); (substituted off) Entienne Swanepoel (to (Italy) Valsugana); (substituted off) Dayan van der Westhuizen (to Blue Bulls XV)	(substituted on) Lupumlo Mguca (from Eastern Province Elephants); (substituted on) NJ Oosthuizen (from Griquas); (substituted on) De-Jay Terblanche (from Pumas); (substituted on) Alulutho Tshakweni (from Blue Bulls U21); (substituted on) Xandré Vos (from Eastern Province Elephants)	Rossouw de Klerk; Martin Dreyer; Schalk Ferreira; Justin Forwood; Lupumlo Mguca; NJ Oosthuizen; Luvuyo Pupuma; Pieter Scholtz; De-Jay Terblanche; Alulutho Tshakweni; Xandré Vos
HK	Tango Balekile; Stephan Coetzee; Alandré van Rooyen; Mike Willemse	(substituted off) Stephan Coetzee (to (United States) Seattle Seawolves)	(substituted on) Kerron van Vuuren (from Sharks)	Tango Balekile; Alandré van Rooyen; Kerron van Vuuren; Mike Willemse
LK	Bobby de Wee; Stephan Greeff; Giant Mtyanda; Freddy Ngoza; Dries van Schalkwyk; Jurie van Vuuren; Lindokuhle Welemu	(substituted off) Freddy Ngoza (to Boland Cavaliers); (substituted off) Lindokuhle Welemu (not named)	(substituted on) JC Astle (from (France) Mont-de-Marsan); (substituted on) Schalk Oelofse (from (France) Mont-de-Marsan)	JC Astle; Bobby de Wee; Stephan Greeff; Giant Mtyanda; Schalk Oelofse; Dries van Schalkwyk; Jurie van Vuuren
FL	Eital Bredenkamp; Tienie Burger; Khaya Majola; Siya Mdaka; Andisa Ntsila; Victor Sekekete; CJ Velleman	(substituted off) Eital Bredenkamp (to Griquas); (substituted off) Khaya Majola (not named); (substituted off) Siya Mdaka (to Leopards); (substituted off) Victor Sekekete (to Blue Bulls)	(substituted on) Brandon Brown (from Eastern Province Elephants); (substituted on) Stephan de Wit (from Western Province)	Brandon Brown; Tienie Burger; Stephan de Wit; Andisa Ntsila; CJ Velleman
N8	Lusanda Badiyana; Ruaan Lerm	(substituted off) Lusanda Badiyana (to Eastern Province Elephants)		Ruaan Lerm
SH	Rowan Gouws; Godlen Masimla; JP Smith; Rudi van Rooyen	(substituted off) Rowan Gouws (to Eastern Province Elephants); (substituted off) JP Smith (to Eastern Province Elephants)	(substituted on) Sarel Pretorius (from (Wales) Dragons); (substituted on) Stefan Ungerer (from Pumas); (substituted on) Ruan van Rensburg (from Cheetahs)	Godlen Masimla; Sarel Pretorius; Stefan Ungerer; Ruan van Rensburg; Rudi van Rooyen
FH	Kurt Coleman; Pieter-Steyn de Wet; Martin du Toit; Benhard Janse van Rensburg; JC Roos; Oliver Zono	(substituted off) Kurt Coleman (injured); (substituted off) Pieter-Steyn de Wet (to (France) Aurillac); (substituted off) Benhard Janse van Rensburg (to Cheetahs); (substituted off) JC Roos (retired)	(substituted on) Bader Pretorius (from Golden Lions U21)	Martin du Toit; Bader Pretorius; Oliver Zono
CE	Berton Klaasen; Harlon Klaasen; Jacques Nel; Jarryd Sage; Luzuko Vulindlu	(substituted off) Jacques Nel (to (France) Aurillac); (substituted off) Jarryd Sage (to (Wales) Dragons); (substituted off) Luzuko Vulindlu (not named)	(substituted on) Ulrich Beyers (from Blue Bulls XV); (substituted on) Tristan Blewett (from Sharks); (substituted on) Tertius Kruger (from Cheetahs); (substituted on) Meli Rokoua (from (Portugal) Agronomia)	Ulrich Beyers; Tristan Blewett; Berton Klaasen; Harlon Klaasen; Tertius Kruger; Meli Rokoua
WG	Alshaun Bock; Michael Makase; Yaw Penxe; S'bura Sithole; Anthony Volmink	(substituted off) Alshaun Bock (to SWD Eagles); (substituted off) Anthony Volmink (to Golden Lions XV)	(substituted on) Bjorn Basson (from (France) Oyonnax)	Bjorn Basson; Michael Makase; Yaw Penxe; S'bura Sithole
FB	Masixole Banda; Ntabeni Dukisa		(substituted on) Michael Botha (from Eastern Province Elephants); (substituted on) Courtney Winnaar (from Sharks)	Masixole Banda; Michael Botha; Ntabeni Dukisa; Courtney Winnaar
Coach	Deon Davids			Deon Davids

== Standings ==
The final Conference B log standings were:

2018–19 Pro14 Conference B
Pos	Team	P	W	D	L	PF	PA	PD	TF	TA	TB	LB	Pts
1	(Ireland) Leinster	21	15	1	5	672	385	+287	95	49	12	2	76
2	(Ireland) Ulster	21	13	2	6	441	424	+17	58	54	6	1	63
3	(Italy) Benetton	21	11	2	8	474	431	+43	63	55	6	3	57
4	(Wales) Scarlets	21	10	0	11	510	470	+40	68	54	7	5	52
5	(Scotland) Edinburgh	21	10	0	11	431	436	−5	52	59	6	5	51
6	(Wales) Dragons	21	5	1	15	339	599	−260	37	84	1	3	26
7	(South Africa) Southern Kings	21	2	1	18	385	735	−350	54	107	5	7	22

=== Round-by-round ===
The table below shows the Southern Kings' progression throughout the season. For each round, their cumulative points total is shown with the conference position:

Team	R1	R2	R3	R4	R5	R6	R7	R8	R9	R10	R11	R12	R13	R14	R15	R16	R17	R18	R19	R20	R21	QF	SF	Final
Opposition	ZEB	DRA	ULS	GLA	SCA	BEN	SCA	LEI	CON	BEN	EDI	CHE	EDI	CHE	MUN	LEI	CAR	ULS	DRA	OSP	CHE	—N/a	—N/a	—N/a
Cumulative Points	0	2	2	7	7	7	9	11	11	12	12	13	17	19	19	19	20	20	22	22	22	—N/a	—N/a	—N/a
Position	7th	7th	7th	6th	7th	7th	7th	6th	7th	7th	7th	7th	7th	7th	7th	7th	6th	6th	6th	6th	7th	—N/a	—N/a	—N/a
Key:	win	draw	loss	bye																				

== Matches ==
The Southern Kings' matches in the 2018–19 Pro14 were:

1 September 2018	Zebre	32–16	Southern Kings	Stadio Sergio Lanfranchi, Parma
20:35	Try: Oliviero Fabiani 4'; Mattia Bellini 36'; Jimmy Tuivaiti 54'; Apisai Tauyavuca 79'; Con: Carlo Canna 5', 37', 56'; Pen: Carlo Canna 14', 67'	Report	Try: Michael Botha 15'; Con: Masixole Banda 16'; Pen: Masixole Banda 49', 52', 59'; Cards: Andisa Ntsila (yellow card) 70'; Bobby de Wee (yellow card) 78'	Attendance: 3,000; Referee: Mike Adamson

8 September 2018	Dragons	27–22	Southern Kings	Rodney Parade, Newport
15:00	Try: Ollie Griffiths 3'; Aaron Wainwright 13'; Josh Lewis 66'; Con: Josh Lewis 4', 14', 67'; Pen: Josh Lewis 21', 62'; Cards: Rhodri Williams (yellow card) 26' to 36'	Report	Try: Mike Willemse 27'; Bjorn Basson 30'; Godlen Masimla 55'; Yaw Penxe 79'; Con: Masixole Banda 56'	Attendance: 4,012; Referee: Frank Murphy

16 September 2018	Southern Kings	7–28	Ulster	Nelson Mandela Bay Stadium, Port Elizabeth
14:15	Try: Mike Willemse 42'; Con: Masixole Banda 43'; Cards: Tienie Burger (yellow card) 19' to 29'	Report	Try: Marcell Coetzee 60'; Angus Kernohan 66'; Angus Curtis 80'; Con: Billy Burns 61'; Peter Nelson 80'; Pen: John Cooney 4', 9', 26'; Cards: Alan O'Connor (yellow card) 22' to 32'; Rob Herring (yellow card) 39' to 49'	Attendance: 5,096; Referee: Sam Grove-White

22 September 2018	Southern Kings	38–28	Glasgow Warriors	NMU Stadium, Port Elizabeth
15:00	Try: Yaw Penxe 5'; Martin du Toit 9', 71'; Rudi van Rooyen 18'; Harlon Klaasen 52'; Con: Masixole Banda 6', 10', 18', 52', 72'; Pen: Masixole Banda 40'; Cards: Yaw Penxe (yellow card) 27' to 37'; Brandon Brown (yellow card) 55' to 65'; Godlen Masimla (yellow card) 79'	Report	Try: Nick Grigg 59'; D. T. H. van der Merwe 63', 80'; Fraser Brown 76'; Con: Adam Hastings 59', 64', 76', 80'	Attendance: 3,160; Referee: Andrew Brace

29 September 2018	Scarlets	54–14	Southern Kings	Parc y Scarlets, Llanelli
18:30	Try: Jonathan Davies 9', 24'; Paul Asquith 15'; Ioan Nicholas 42'; Dan Davis 58'; Simon Gardiner 65'; Steff Evans 72'; Kieran Hardy 80'; Con: Rhys Patchell 10', 16', 24', 43', 59'; Angus O'Brien 74', 80'	Report	Try: Bjorn Basson 20', 33'; Con: Masixole Banda 21', 34'; Cards: Bjorn Basson (yellow card) 76'	Attendance: 7,529; Referee: Sean Gallagher

6 October 2018	Benetton	28–5	Southern Kings	Stadio Comunale di Monigo, Treviso
20:00	Try: Luca Bigi 3'; Dewaldt Duvenage 16' penalty try 22', 51'; Con: Tommaso Allan 5', 17'	Report	Try: Yaw Penxe 30'; Cards: Justin Forwood (yellow card) 10' to 20' (red card) 51'; Schalk Oelofse (yellow card) 22' to 32'	Attendance: 2,200; Referee: Craig Evans

26 October 2018	Southern Kings	34–41	Scarlets	NMU Stadium, Port Elizabeth
19:00	Try: Masixole Banda 1'; Yaw Penxe 21'; Harlon Klaasen 48'; Bjorn Basson 54'; Con: Masixole Banda 2', 22', 49', 55'; Pen: Masixole Banda 12', 33'; Cards: Lupumlo Mguca (yellow card) 76'	Report	Try: Dafydd Hughes 27'; Will Boyde 39'; Ioan Nicholas 41'; Werner Kruger 62'; Kieran Hardy 72'; Taylor Davies 77'; Con: Dan Jones 28', 42', 63', 73'; Pen: Dan Jones 16'	Attendance: 2,473; Referee: John Lacey

4 November 2018	Southern Kings	31–38	Leinster	NMU Stadium, Port Elizabeth
14:45	Try: Yaw Penxe 2'; Stefan Ungerer 32', 42'; Lupumlo Mguca 71'; Dries van Schalkwyk 79'; Con: Masixole Banda 33', 43', 79'; Cards: Stephan Greeff (yellow card) 25' to 35'; Schalk Ferreira (yellow card) 29' to 39'; Tienie Burger (yellow card) 40' to 50'; Berton Klaasen (yellow card) 75'	Report	Try: Adam Byrne 15' penalty try 24'; Jamison Gibson-Park 36'; Dan Leavy 38'; Max Deegan 40'; Bryan Byrne 63'; Con: Noel Reid 37', 38', 40'	Attendance: 1,142; Referee: Lloyd Linton

25 November 2018	Southern Kings	14–31	Connacht	NMU Stadium, Port Elizabeth
15:00	Try: Masixole Banda 27'; Ntabeni Dukisa 50'; Con: Masixole Banda 28', 51'; Cards: Lupumlo Mguca (yellow card) 35' to 45'	Report	Try: Cian Kelleher 10' penalty try 35'; Matt Healy 39'; Paul Boyle 61'; Con: Jack Carty 11', 40'; David Horwitz 61'; Pen: Jack Carty 4'	Attendance: 3,207; Referee: George Clancy

1 December 2018	Southern Kings	19–22	Benetton	NMU Stadium, Port Elizabeth
19:15	Try: Tertius Kruger 10', 80'; Luvuyo Pupuma 74'; Con: Masixole Banda 11', 74'; Cards: Masixole Banda (yellow card) 80'	Report	Try: Hame Faiva 5', 25', 37'; Monty Ioane 50'; Con: Ian McKinley 27'	Attendance: 1,459; Referee: Sean Gallagher

5 January 2019	Edinburgh	38–0	Southern Kings	Murrayfield Stadium, Edinburgh
19:35	Try: Dougie Fife 3'; Darcy Graham 6', 10'; Rory Sutherland 40'; Simon Berghan 45'; Cameron Fenton 62'; Con: Simon Hickey 4', 7', 40', 64'	Report		Attendance: 4,549; Referee: John Lacey

18 January 2019	Southern Kings	17–24	Cheetahs	NMU Stadium, Port Elizabeth
19:00	Try: Ntabeni Dukisa 42' penalty try 72'; Con: Masixole Banda 42'; Pen: Masixole Banda 48'	Report	Try: Rabz Maxwane 6'; Junior Pokomela 45'; Luan de Bruin 80'; Con: Tian Schoeman 8', 46'; Louis Fouché 80'; Pen: Benhard Janse van Rensburg 63'; Cards: Tian Meyer (yellow card) 16' to 26'; Luan de Bruin (yellow card) 72' to 80'	Attendance: 3,872; Referee: Quinton Immelman

26 January 2019	Southern Kings	25–21	Edinburgh	NMU Stadium, Port Elizabeth
17:15	Try: Bjorn Basson 3'; Bader Pretorius 75'; Yaw Penxe 77'; Con: Masixole Banda 5', 76'; Pen: Masixole Banda 10', 37'; Cards: CJ Velleman (yellow card) 60' to 70'	Report	Try: Chris Dean 7' penalty try 61'; Ross Ford 71'; Con: Jaco van der Walt 8', 73'; Cards: James Johnstone (yellow card) 74'	Attendance: 3,477; Referee: Dan Jones

2 February 2019	Cheetahs	40–36	Southern Kings	Toyota Stadium, Bloemfontein
16:00	Try: Shaun Venter 6'; Tian Schoeman 14'; William Small-Smith 22'; Malcolm Jaer 54'; Junior Pokomela 62'; Reinach Venter 65'; Con: Tian Schoeman 7', 15', 56', 63', 66'; Cards: Joseph Dweba (yellow card) 32' to 42'; William Small-Smith (yellow card) 38' to 48'	Report	Try: CJ Velleman 33'; Yaw Penxe 46'; Tienie Burger 72'; Alandré van Rooyen 75'; Berton Klaasen 80'; Con: Masixole Banda 34', 73', 76', 80'; Pen: Masixole Banda 2'; Cards: Meli Rokoua (yellow card) 21' to 31'; CJ Velleman (red card) 62'	Attendance: 4,298; Referee: Stuart Berry

15 February 2019	Munster	43–0	Southern Kings	Irish Independent Park, Cork
19:35	Try: Neil Cronin 13'; Andrew Conway 37'; Darren Sweetnam 53'; Billy Holland 60'; Rhys Marshall 66'; Jean Kleyn 70'; Rory Scannell 79'; Con: Rory Scannell 14', 54', 67', 80'	Report	Cards: Ruaan Lerm (yellow card) 35' to 45'; Tertius Kruger (yellow card) 68' to 78'; Andisa Ntsila (yellow card) 69' to 79'	Attendance: 8,008; Referee: Andrea Piardi

22 February 2019	Leinster	59–19	Southern Kings	RDS Arena, Dublin
19:55	Try: Noel Reid 5', 36'; Ed Byrne 23', 27'; Barry Daly 46'; Andrew Porter 54'; Max Deegan 64'; Paddy Patterson 74'; Rory O'Loughlin 77'; Con: Ross Byrne 6', 24', 47', 56', 65', 75', 78'	Report	Try: Bjorn Basson 12'; Sarel Pretorius 19'; Ulrich Beyers 42'; Con: Bader Pretorius 20', 43'	Attendance: 10,435; Referee: Sam Grove-White

2 March 2019	Cardiff Blues	26–19	Southern Kings	Cardiff Arms Park, Cardiff
19:35	Try: Owen Lane 1'; Nick Williams 50'; Olly Robinson 61'; Jason Harries 76'; Con: Jarrod Evans 2', 62', 77'; Cards: Nick Williams (yellow card) 32' to 42'	Report	Try: Dries van Schalkwyk 36'; Mike Willemse 42'; Masixole Banda 80'; Con: Bader Pretorius 37'; Masixole Banda 80'; Cards: Tertius Kruger (yellow card) 71'	Attendance: 5,312; Referee: Joy Neville

23 March 2019	Ulster	33–19	Southern Kings	Kingspan Stadium, Belfast
17:30	Try: Stuart McCloskey 7'; Rob Lyttle 14'; Marcell Coetzee 35'; Robert Baloucoune 47'; John Andrew 75'; Con: Billy Burns 9', 16', 36'; John Cooney 49'	Report	Try: Yaw Penxe 21'; Ulrich Beyers 26'; Mike Willemse 63'; Con: Bader Pretorius 27', 64'; Cards: Tertius Kruger (red card) 67'; Alandré van Rooyen (yellow card) 67' to 77'	Attendance: 13,748; Referee: Lloyd Linton

7 April 2019	Southern Kings	18–18	Dragons	NMU Stadium, Port Elizabeth
15:00	Try: Stefan Ungerer 16'; Bjorn Basson 18'; Harlon Klaasen 51'; Pen: Bader Pretorius 32'; Cards: Alulutho Tshakweni (yellow card) 58' to 68'; Michael Makase (yellow card) 63' to 73'	Report	Try: Adam Warren 2'; Jordan Williams 56'; Con: Josh Lewis 56'; Pen: Josh Lewis 10', 78'; Cards: Leon Brown (yellow card) 58' to 68'; Lloyd Fairbrother (yellow card) 61' to 71'	Attendance: 2,497; Referee: Frank Murphy

12 April 2019	Southern Kings	7–43	Ospreys	NMU Stadium, Port Elizabeth
19:35	Try: Mike Willemse 61'; Con: Masixole Banda 62'; Cards: Stephan Greeff (yellow card) 52' to 62'	Report	Try: Dan Evans 13', 17', 56'; Cory Allen 19'; Hanno Dirksen 25'; Bradley Davies 29', 78'; Con: Luke Price 14', 18', 25', 30'	Attendance: 1,792; Referee: Andrew Brace

27 April 2019	Cheetahs	61–25	Southern Kings	Toyota Stadium, Bloemfontein
17:30	Try: Abongile Nonkontwana 8'; Walt Steenkamp 17'; Joseph Dweba 28'; Shaun Venter 39', 63'; Louis Fouché 41'; Benhard Janse van Rensburg 55'; Malcolm Jaer 70'; Boan Venter 80'; Con: Tian Schoeman 10', 18', 30', 40', 56', 64', 71', 80'	Report	Try: Harlon Klaasen 34', 46'; Bjorn Basson 50'; Con: Masixole Banda 35', 46'; Pen: Masixole Banda 3', 13'; Cards: Meli Rokoua (yellow card) 28' to 38'

== Player statistics ==
The Pro14 appearance record for players that represented the Southern Kings in 2018–19 is as follows:

2018–19 Southern Kings player statistics
Player name	ZEB	DRA	ULS	GLA	SCA	BEN	SCA	LEI	CON	BEN	EDI	CHE	EDI	CHE	MUN	LEI	CAR	ULS	DRA	OSP	CHE	App	Try	Con	Pen	DG	Pts
Justin Forwood	1	1	18 (substituted on)	17 (substituted on)		1	17 (substituted on)	3														7	0	0	0	0	0
Mike Willemse	2	2	2	2	2	2					16 (substituted on)	2	2	2	2	2	2	2	2	2	2	17	5	0	0	0	25
Luvuyo Pupuma	3	3	3	3	3	3	3		18 (substituted on)	18 (substituted on)	18 (substituted on)		3	18 (substituted on)								12	1	0	0	0	5
Schalk Oelofse	4	4			19 (substituted on)	4	4			19 (substituted on)										19 (substituted on)	19 (substituted on)	8	0	0	0	0	0
Bobby de Wee	5	5	5	5	5	19 (substituted on)																6	0	0	0	0	0
Brandon Brown	6			6	6							7	20 (substituted on)			6	6	6				8	0	0	0	0	0
Tienie Burger	7	7	7			20 (substituted on)	20 (substituted on)	7	20 (substituted on)	7	7		7	7	7	7	7	7	7		7	17	1	0	0	0	5
Ruaan Lerm	8	20 (substituted on)	20 (substituted on)	8	8	8	8	8	8	8	8	8		8	8	8		8	8	8	8	19	0	0	0	0	0
Rudi van Rooyen	9	9	21 (substituted on)	9	21		21 (substituted on)										21 (substituted on)	21 (substituted on)	21 (substituted on)	21 (substituted on)	21 (substituted on)	10	1	0	0	0	5
Masixole Banda	10	10	10	15	15	15	15	15	15	10	15	15	15	15	15	23 (substituted on)	23 (substituted on)	23 (substituted on)	15	23 (substituted on)	15	21	3	32	12	0	115
Yaw Penxe	11	15	14	14	14	14	14	11	11	14	11	14	14	14	14	14	14	14				18	8	0	0	0	40
Berton Klaasen	12	12	12	12	12	12	12	22 (substituted on)	12		22 (substituted on)	12		23 (substituted on)	12	12	22		23 (substituted on)	12		16	1	0	0	0	5
Harlon Klaasen	13	13	13	13	13	13	13	13	13	23 (substituted on)	13	23 (substituted on)	13					22 (substituted on)	13	14	13	17	5	0	0	0	25
Michael Makase	14	14						14	14		14								14			6	0	0	0	0	0
Michael Botha	15		15	23 (substituted on)						15												4	1	0	0	0	5
Alandré van Rooyen	16 (substituted on)	16 (substituted on)	16 (substituted on)	16 (substituted on)	16 (substituted on)	16 (substituted on)	2	2	2		2	16 (substituted on)	16 (substituted on)	16 (substituted on)	16 (substituted on)	16 (substituted on)	16 (substituted on)	16 (substituted on)	16 (substituted on)	16 (substituted on)	16 (substituted on)	20	1	0	0	0	5
Schalk Ferreira	17 (substituted on)	17 (substituted on)	1	1	1		1	1				1	1	1	1	17 (substituted on)	17 (substituted on)	17 (substituted on)	1	1	1	17	0	0	0	0	0
Lupumlo Mguca	18 (substituted on)	18 (substituted on)			17 (substituted on)	17 (substituted on)	18 (substituted on)	18 (substituted on)	1			17	18 (substituted on)				18 (substituted on)	18 (substituted on)			18 (substituted on)	11	1	0	0	0	5
JC Astle	19 (substituted on)	19 (substituted on)	4	4	4	5	5	5	5	5	5	5	5	5	5	19 (substituted on)	5	5	5	5	5	21	0	0	0	0	0
Andisa Ntsila	20 (substituted on)	8	8	7	7	7	7					20 (substituted on)	8	20 (substituted on)	20 (substituted on)	20 (substituted on)	8	20 (substituted on)	6	6		16	0	0	0	0	0
Godlen Masimla	21 (substituted on)	21 (substituted on)	9	21 (substituted on)	9	9	9	21 (substituted on)	21 (substituted on)	21 (substituted on)												10	1	0	0	0	5
Martin du Toit	22 (substituted on)	22 (substituted on)	22 (substituted on)	10	10	10	10	10	10		10	22 (substituted on)										11	2	0	0	0	10
Ulrich Beyers	23 (substituted on)	23 (substituted on)								22 (substituted on)					23 (substituted on)	15	15	15	22 (substituted on)	15		9	2	0	0	0	10
Stephan de Wit		6	6				6	6							6		20 (substituted on)		20 (substituted on)	20 (substituted on)	6	9	0	0	0	0	0
Bjorn Basson		11	11	11	11	11	11			11		11	11	11	11	11	11	11	11	11	11	17	8	0	0	0	40
Xandré Vos			17 (substituted on)																		17 (substituted on)	2	0	0	0	0	0
Giant Mtyanda			19 (substituted on)								19 (substituted on)											2	0	0	0	0	0
Ntabeni Dukisa			23 (substituted on)	22 (substituted on)	23 (substituted on)	23 (substituted on)			22 (substituted on)		23 (substituted on)	10	10	10							23 (substituted on)	10	2	0	0	0	10
Martin Dreyer				18 (substituted on)																		1	0	0	0	0	0
Stephan Greeff				19 (substituted on)			19 (substituted on)	4	4	4	4	4	19 (substituted on)	19 (substituted on)	19 (substituted on)	4	19 (substituted on)	19 (substituted on)	19 (substituted on)	4		15	0	0	0	0	0
CJ Velleman				20 (substituted on)	20 (substituted on)	6		20 (substituted on)	6	6	6	6	6	6								10	1	0	0	0	5
Rossouw de Klerk					18 (substituted on)	18 (substituted on)						18 (substituted on)										3	0	0	0	0	0
Tristan Blewett					22 (substituted on)	22 (substituted on)																2	0	0	0	0	0
Ruan van Rensburg						21 (substituted on)																1	0	0	0	0	0
Tango Balekile							16 (substituted on)	16 (substituted on)	16 (substituted on)	16 (substituted on)												4	0	0	0	0	0
Tertius Kruger							22 (substituted on)	12	23 (substituted on)	12	12	13	12	12	22 (substituted on)	22 (substituted on)	12	12	12			13	2	0	0	0	10
Meli Rokoua							23 (substituted on)	23 (substituted on)		13			23 (substituted on)	13	13	13	13	13		22 (substituted on)	14	11	0	0	0	0	0
Stefan Ungerer								9	9	9	9	9	9	9	9	21 (substituted on)		9	9	9	9	13	3	0	0	0	15
NJ Oosthuizen								17 (substituted on)	3	1	17 (substituted on)	3										5	0	0	0	0	0
Dries van Schalkwyk								19 (substituted on)	19 (substituted on)	20 (substituted on)	20 (substituted on)	19 (substituted on)	4	4	4	5	4	4	4	7	4	14	2	0	0	0	10
Jurie van Vuuren									7												20 (substituted on)	2	0	0	0	0	0
Alulutho Tshakweni									17 (substituted on)	17 (substituted on)	1		17 (substituted on)	17 (substituted on)	17 (substituted on)	1	1	1	17 (substituted on)	17 (substituted on)		11	0	0	0	0	0
Kerron van Vuuren										2												1	0	0	0	0	0
Pieter Scholtz										3	3				18 (substituted on)	18 (substituted on)			18 (substituted on)	18 (substituted on)		6	0	0	0	0	0
Sarel Pretorius											21 (substituted on)	21 (substituted on)	21 (substituted on)	21 (substituted on)	21 (substituted on)	9	9					7	1	0	0	0	5
Bader Pretorius													22 (substituted on)	22 (substituted on)	10	10	10	10	10	10	22 (substituted on)	9	1	5	1	0	18
De-Jay Terblanche														3	3	3	3	3	3	3	3	8	0	0	0	0	0
S'bura Sithole																				13	12	2	0	0	0	0	0
Courtney Winnaar																					10	1	0	0	0	0	0
penalty try																						–	1	–	–	–	7
Total																						21	54	37	13	0	385
(c) denotes the team captain. For each match, the player's squad number is shown. Starting players are numbered 1 to 15, while the replacements are numbered 16 to 23. If a replacement made an appearance in the match, it is indicated by (substituted on) . "App" refers to the number of appearances made by the player, "Try" to the number of tries scored by the player, "Con" to the number of conversions kicked, "Pen" to the number of penalties kicked, "DG" to the number of drop goals kicked and "Pts" refer to the total number of points scored by the player. Oliver Zono was named in the squad for the season, but never included in a matchday squad.

== See also ==
- Southern Kings
- Pro14
