= 2017 Southern Kings season =

Southern Kings
- 2017 season
- Head coach: Deon Davids
- Captain: Schalk Ferreira
- Stadium: Nelson Mandela Bay Stadium
- Overall: 11th
- S.A. Group: 5th
- Africa 2 Conference: 4th
- Record: Won 6, Lost 9
- Top try scorer: All: Makazole Mapimpi (11)
- Top points scorer: All: Lionel Cronjé (136)
Home colours	Away colours

In 2017, the Southern Kings participated in the 2017 Super Rugby competition, their third appearance in the competition after also playing in 2013 and 2016. They were included in the Africa 2 Conference of the competition, along with Jaguares, Lions and Sharks.

In April 2017, SANZAAR announced that three clubs would be cut from Super Rugby for the 2018 Super Rugby season, with two of those teams coming from South Africa. A newly-established SARU Franchise Committee was tasked with determining the two teams to drop out of Super Rugby, and on 7 July 2017, it was confirmed that the Cheetahs and Kings would not participate in the competition going forward, but would "explore alternative playing opportunities in other international competitions". On 1 August 2017, the European-based Pro12 announced that the competition would expand to 14 teams — being rebranded the Pro14 — and that the Cheetahs and Kings would be the teams joining the expanded tournament from the 2017–18 season onwards.

== Personnel ==
=== Coaches and management ===
The Kings coaching and management staff for the 2017 Super Rugby season were:

2017 Kings coaches and management
Position	Name
Head coach	Deon Davids
Forwards coach	Barend Pieterse
Backs coach	Vuyo Zangqa
Attack and fundamental skills coach	Dave Williams
Kicking coach	Henning van der Merwe

=== Squad ===
The following players were named in the Kings squad for the 2017 Super Rugby season:

2017 Kings squad
Player	Union	Position/s	Date of birth (age)	Super Rugby		Kings	
Player	Union	Position/s	Date of birth (age)	Apps	Pts	Apps	Pts
(South Africa) Tango Balekile	Eastern Province Kings	Hooker	7 March 1996 (aged 20)	–	–	–	–
(South Africa) Masixole Banda	Border Bulldogs	Fly-half / Fullback	11 June 1988 (aged 28)	–	–	–	–
(South Africa) Martin Bezuidenhout	Eastern Province Kings	Hooker	21 August 1989 (aged 27)	41	15	7	0
(South Africa) Thembelani Bholi	Eastern Province Kings	Flanker	18 January 1990 (aged 27)	9	5	9	5
(South Africa) Alshaun Bock	Griquas	Winger	16 May 1982 (aged 34)	–	–	–	–
(Namibia) Chrysander Botha	Eastern Province Kings	Fullback	13 July 1988 (aged 28)	11	0	–	–
(South Africa) Chris Cloete	Pumas	Flanker	15 February 1991 (aged 26)	9	20	9	20
(South Africa) Lionel Cronjé	Eastern Province Kings	Fly-half	25 May 1989 (aged 27)	17	54	–	–
(South Africa) Christiaan de Bruin	Eastern Province Kings	Number eight	20 January 1993 (aged 24)	–	–	–	–
(South Africa) Pieter-Steyn de Wet	Eastern Province Kings	Fly-half	8 January 1991 (aged 26)	–	–	–	–
(South Africa) Ntabeni Dukisa	Border Bulldogs	Utility back	25 July 1988 (aged 28)	–	–	–	–
(South Africa) Schalk Ferreira	Eastern Province Kings	Prop	9 February 1984 (aged 33)	43	15	27	15
(South Africa) Justin Forwood	Eastern Province Kings	Prop	19 September 1993 (aged 23)	–	–	–	–
(South Africa) Ross Geldenhuys	Eastern Province Kings	Prop	19 April 1983 (aged 33)	40	0	–	–
(South Africa) Siyanda Grey	Eastern Province Kings	Winger	16 August 1989 (aged 27)	5	0	5	0
(South Africa) Stokkies Hanekom	Golden Lions	Centre	17 May 1989 (aged 27)	6	0	–	–
(South Africa) Kurt Haupt	SWD Eagles	Hooker	17 January 1989 (aged 28)	–	–	–	–
(South Africa) Chris Heiberg	Eastern Province Kings	Prop	1 June 1985 (aged 31)	23	0	–	–
(South Africa) Irné Herbst	Eastern Province Kings	Lock	4 May 1993 (aged 23)	–	–	–	–
(South Africa) Malcolm Jaer	Eastern Province Kings	Fullback	29 June 1995 (aged 21)	10	10	10	10
(South Africa) Berton Klaasen	Eastern Province Kings	Centre	24 January 1990 (aged 27)	–	–	–	–
(South Africa) Ruaan Lerm	Pumas	Number eight	25 March 1992 (aged 24)	3	0	–	–
(South Africa) Cameron Lindsay	Eastern Province Kings	Lock	15 October 1991 (aged 25)	–	–	–	–
(South Africa) Mzamo Majola	Sharks	Prop	20 February 1995 (aged 22)	–	–	–	–
(South Africa) Sintu Manjezi	Eastern Province Kings	Lock / Flanker	7 April 1995 (aged 21)	2	0	2	0
(South Africa) Makazole Mapimpi	Border Bulldogs	Winger	26 July 1990 (aged 26)	–	–	–	–
(South Africa) Neil Maritz	Sharks	Winger	22 February 1994 (aged 23)	–	–	–	–
(South Africa) Garrick Mattheus	Eastern Province Kings	Fly-half	23 March 1996 (aged 20)	–	–	–	–
(South Africa) Wandile Mjekevu	Sharks	Winger	7 January 1991 (aged 26)	14	35	4	15
(South Africa) Giant Mtyanda	Eastern Province Kings	Lock	19 March 1986 (aged 30)	13	0	–	–
(South Africa) Waylon Murray	Eastern Province Kings	Centre	27 April 1986 (aged 30)	71	40	8	0
(South Africa) Andisa Ntsila	SWD Eagles	Flanker	7 November 1993 (aged 23)	2	0	2	0
(South Africa) Tyler Paul	Eastern Province Kings	Lock / Flanker	20 January 1995 (aged 22)	–	–	–	–
(South Africa) Yaw Penxe	Eastern Province Kings	Winger	3 April 1997 (aged 19)	–	–	–	–
(South Africa) Wandile Putuma	Border Bulldogs	Lock	8 August 1990 (aged 26)	–	–	–	–
(South Africa) Louis Schreuder	Eastern Province Kings	Scrum-half	25 April 1990 (aged 26)	66	10	–	–
(South Africa) Ricky Schroeder	Eastern Province Kings	Scrum-half	5 January 1991 (aged 26)	–	–	–	–
(South Africa) Johan Steyn	SWD Eagles	Scrum-half	8 October 1995 (aged 21)	–	–	–	–
(Namibia) Johann Tromp	Eastern Province Kings	Utility back	23 December 1990 (aged 26)	–	–	–	–
(South Africa) Stefan Ungerer	Eastern Province Kings	Scrum-half	23 November 1993 (aged 23)	17	25	–	–
(South Africa) Schalk van der Merwe	Eastern Province Kings	Prop	4 December 1990 (aged 26)	25	5	–	–
(South Africa) Wilhelm van der Sluys	Northampton Saints	Lock	14 August 1991 (aged 25)	–	–	–	–
(South Africa) Dayan van der Westhuizen	Eastern Province Kings	Prop	5 April 1994 (aged 22)	–	–	–	–
(South Africa) Rudi van Rooyen	Griquas	Scrum-half	5 January 1992 (aged 25)	–	–	–	–
(South Africa) CJ Velleman	Eastern Province Kings	Flanker	24 February 1995 (aged 22)	10	0	10	0
(South Africa) Luzuko Vulindlu	SWD Eagles	Winger / Centre	14 November 1987 (aged 29)	20	15	11	10
(South Africa) Mike Willemse	Eastern Province Kings	Hooker	14 February 1993 (aged 24)	4	0	–	–
(South Africa) Stefan Willemse	Eastern Province Kings	Flanker	12 April 1992 (aged 24)	11	0	11	0
(South Africa) Mzwanele Zito	Griquas	Lock	23 November 1988 (aged 28)	–	–	–	–

== Log ==
2017 Super Rugby standings
Pos	Team	Pld	W	D	L	PF	PA	PD	TF	TA	TB	LB	Pts	Qualification
1	Lions	15	14	0	1	590	268	+322	81	27	9	0	65	Quarter-finals (Conference leaders)
2	Crusaders (C)	15	14	0	1	544	303	+241	77	37	7	0	63	Quarter-finals (Conference leaders)
3	Stormers	15	10	0	5	490	436	+54	64	61	3	0	43	Quarter-finals (Conference leaders)
4	Brumbies	15	6	0	9	315	279	+36	41	32	3	7	34	Quarter-finals (Conference leaders)
5	Hurricanes	15	12	0	3	596	272	+324	89	31	9	1	58	Quarter-finals (Wildcard)
6	Chiefs	15	12	1	2	433	292	+141	55	30	6	1	57	Quarter-finals (Wildcard)
7	Highlanders	15	11	0	4	488	308	+180	62	40	5	2	51	Quarter-finals (Wildcard)
8	Sharks	15	9	1	5	392	323	+69	38	37	1	3	42	Quarter-finals (Wildcard)
9	Blues	15	7	1	7	425	391	+34	55	50	4	3	37	
10	Jaguares	15	7	0	8	404	386	+18	49	45	1	4	33	
11	Southern Kings (Note: The Cheetahs, Force, and Southern Kings were all axed from the competition at the conclusion of the 2017 season.)	15	6	0	9	391	470	−79	49	60	1	3	28	
12	Force	15	6	0	9	313	404	−91	36	55	1	1	26	
13	Cheetahs	15	4	0	11	395	551	−156	46	75	1	4	21	
14	Reds	15	4	0	11	321	479	−158	46	61	1	4	21	
15	Bulls	15	4	0	11	339	459	−120	39	59	0	4	20	
16	Waratahs	15	4	0	11	396	522	−126	52	68	1	2	19	
17	Sunwolves	15	2	0	13	315	671	−356	41	96	1	3	12	
18	Rebels	15	1	1	13	236	569	−333	23	79	0	3	9	

Source: Rugby.com.au

== Matches ==
25 February 2017	Southern Kings	26–39	Jaguares	Nelson Mandela Bay Stadium, Port Elizabeth
17:15	Try: Makazole Mapimpi 66'; Luzuko Vulindlu 80'; Con: Lionel Cronjé 66', 80' (2/2); Pen: Lionel Cronjé 4', 6', 8', 21' (4/4); Cards: Ross Geldenhuys (yellow card) 22' to 32'	Report; Scoreboard	Try: Gonzalo Bertranou 15'; Leonardo Senatore 53'; Joaquín Tuculet 56'; Con: Joaquín Díaz Bonilla 16' (1/1); Santiago González Iglesias 54', 58' (2/2); Pen: Joaquín Díaz Bonilla 2', 22', 32' (3/3); Santiago González Iglesias 40', 47', 50' (3/3); Cards: Felipe Ezcurra (yellow card) 73'; Matías Moroni (yellow card) 79'	Attendance: 2,226; Referee: Jaco Peyper

4 March 2017	Sunwolves	23–37	Southern Kings	National Stadium, Singapore
18:55	Try: Timothy Lafaele 21'; Kenki Fukuoka 78'; Takaaki Nakazuru 80'; Con: Hayden Cripps 22' (1/3); Pen: Hayden Cripps 56', 62' (2/4)	Report; Scoreboard	Try: Rudi van Rooyen 14'; Chris Cloete 33'; Ruaan Lerm 65'; Malcolm Jaer 77'; Con: Lionel Cronjé 15', 34', 66', 78' (4/4); Pen: Lionel Cronjé 1', 54', 59' (3/3)	Referee: Marius van der Westhuizen

11 March 2017	Southern Kings	10–41	Stormers	Nelson Mandela Bay Stadium, Port Elizabeth
15:05	Try: Makazole Mapimpi 55'; Con: Lionel Cronjé 56' (1/1); Pen: Lionel Cronjé 4' (1/1)	Report; Scoreboard	Try: Dillyn Leyds 15'; Bjorn Basson 28'; Rynhardt Elstadt 35'; Robert du Preez 43'; Justin Phillips 75'; EW Viljoen 79'; Con: Robert du Preez 31', 44' (2/4); Kurt Coleman 76', 80' (2/2); Pen: Robert du Preez 62' (1/1)	Attendance: 9,968; Referee: Shuhei Kubo

18 March 2017	Sharks	19–17	Southern Kings	Kings Park Stadium, Durban
19:30	Try: Lourens Adriaanse 26'; Kobus van Wyk 65'; Pen: Curwin Bosch 3', 43', 70' (3/3)	Report; Scoreboard	Try: Ruaan Lerm 19'; Makazole Mapimpi 31'; Con: Lionel Cronjé 19', 32' (2/2); Pen: Lionel Cronjé 46' (1/3); Cards: Ross Geldenhuys (yellow card) 25' to 35'; Chris Cloete (yellow card) 65' to 75'	Attendance: 19,263; Referee: Egon Seconds

25 March 2017	Southern Kings	19–42	Lions	Nelson Mandela Bay Stadium, Port Elizabeth
15:05	Try: Andisa Ntsila 1'; Yaw Penxe 17'; Malcolm Jaer 42'; Con: Lionel Cronjé 1', 43' (2/3)	Report; Scoreboard	Try: Madosh Tambwe 2', 24'; Malcolm Marx 10'; Elton Jantjies 14'; Jaco Kriel 33'; Harold Vorster 75'; Con: Elton Jantjies 3', 11', 14', 25', 34' (5/5); Andries Coetzee 76' (1/1)	Referee: Quinton Immelman

9 April 2017	Force	46–41	Southern Kings	nib Stadium, Perth
14:05	Try: Jono Lance 9'; Alex Newsome 39', 64'; Dane Haylett-Petty 47' penalty try 71'; Ben McCalman 74'; Con: Jono Lance 10', 47' (2/3); Ian Prior 66', 75' (2/2); Pen: Jono Lance 7', 55' (1/1)	Report; Scoreboard	Try: Justin Forwood 26'; Yaw Penxe 40'; Malcolm Jaer 42', 61', 63'; Makazole Mapimpi 49'; Con: Lionel Cronjé 28', 44', 62', 64' (4/6); Pen: Pieter-Steyn de Wet 77' (1/1)	Referee: Rasta Rasivhenge

15 April 2017	Reds	47–34	Southern Kings	Suncorp Stadium, Brisbane
15:05	Try: Eto Nabuli 5', 47'; Karmichael Hunt 28', 53'; George Smith 42'; Izaia Perese 57', 60'; Con: Quade Cooper 6', 28', 43', 54', 57', 61' (6/7); Cards: Duncan Paia'aua (yellow card) 37' to 47'	Report; Scoreboard	Try: Chris Cloete 22'; Louis Schreuder 50'; Makazole Mapimpi 66', 74'; Masixole Banda 72'; Con: Lionel Cronjé 23', 52' (2/3); Pieter-Steyn de Wet 75' (1/2); Pen: Lionel Cronjé 38' (1/1); Cards: Wandile Mjekevu (yellow card) 68' to 78'	Referee: Quinton Immelman

21 April 2017	Waratahs	24–26	Southern Kings	Allianz Stadium, Sydney
19:45	Try: Taqele Naiyaravoro 12', 80'; Rob Horne 23'; Cameron Clark 33'; Con: Bernard Foley 24', 80' (2/4); Cards: Ned Hanigan (yellow card) 32' to 42'	Report; Scoreboard	Try: Justin Forwood 35'; Masixole Banda 45'; Mike Willemse 66' penalty try 76'; Con: Lionel Cronjé 36', 67' (2/3); Cards: Chris Cloete (yellow card) 52' to 62'	Referee: Rohan Hoffmann

29 April 2017	Southern Kings	44–3	Rebels	Nelson Mandela Bay Stadium, Port Elizabeth
19:30	Try: Wandile Mjekevu 18'; Martin Bezuidenhout 42'; Tyler Paul 57'; Pieter-Steyn de Wet 62'; Makazole Mapimpi 69'; Masixole Banda 79'; Con: Lionel Cronjé 42' (1/2); Pieter-Steyn de Wet 63', 71', 80' (3/4); Pen: Lionel Cronjé 4', 34' (2/2)	Report; Scoreboard	Pen: Reece Hodge 27' (1/1)	Referee: Marius van der Westhuizen

13 May 2017	Southern Kings	35–32	Sharks	Nelson Mandela Bay Stadium, Port Elizabeth
17:15	Try: Alshaun Bock 4', 40'; Lionel Cronjé 38'; Pieter-Steyn de Wet 77'; Con: Lionel Cronjé 38', 41', 79' (3/4); Pen: Lionel Cronjé 2', 62' (2/2); Drop: Lionel Cronjé 31'; Cards: Ross Geldenhuys (yellow card) 53' to 63'	Report; Scoreboard	Try: Dan du Preez 22'; Lwazi Mvovo 58'; Con: Patrick Lambie 24' (1/1); Garth April 59' (1/1); Pen: Patrick Lambie 12', 17' (2/2); Garth April 37', 54', 68', 74' (4/4); Cards: Rhyno Smith (yellow card) 38' to 48'	Referee: Federico Anselmi

20 May 2017	Southern Kings	10–19	Brumbies	Nelson Mandela Bay Stadium, Port Elizabeth
19:30	Try: penalty try 3'; Pen: Lionel Cronjé 16' (1/1); Cards: Ross Geldenhuys (yellow card) 20' to 30'	Report; Scoreboard	Try: Joshua Mann-Rea 21'; Aidan Toua 63'; Tom Banks 70'; Con: Wharenui Hawera 64', 71' (2/3); Cards: Tom Banks (yellow card) 3' to 13'	Referee: Jaco Peyper

28 May 2017	Lions	54–10	Southern Kings	Ellis Park Stadium, Johannesburg
14:30	Try: Andries Ferreira 10'; Courtnall Skosan 18'; Kwagga Smith 40', 54'; Malcolm Marx 41'; Jacques van Rooyen 49'; Faf de Klerk 77'; Andries Coetzee 80'; Con: Elton Jantjies 19', 40', 42', 50', 55' (5/6); Andries Coetzee 78', 80' (2/2); Cards: Robbie Coetzee (red card) 30'	Report; Scoreboard	Try: Luzuko Vulindlu 59'; Con: Pieter-Steyn de Wet 60' (1/1); Pen: Pieter-Steyn de Wet 28' (1/1); Cards: Irné Herbst (yellow card) 8' to 18'; Chris Cloete (yellow card) 30' to 40'	Referee: Jaco Peyper

30 June 2017	Jaguares	30–31	Southern Kings	José Amalfitani Stadium, Buenos Aires
20:05	Try: Juan Manuel Leguizamón 15'; Emiliano Boffelli 30'; Nicolás Sánchez 37'; Joaquín Tuculet 41', 73'; Con: Nicolás Sánchez 38' (1/4); Pen: Nicolás Sánchez 25' (1/2)	Report; Scoreboard	Try: Luzuko Vulindlu 21'; Makazole Mapimpi 27', 58'; Wandile Mjekevu 70'; Con: Lionel Cronjé 22', 28', 59', 71' (4/4); Pen: Lionel Cronjé 45' (1/2)	Referee: Jamie Nutbrown

8 July 2017	Bulls	30–31	Southern Kings	Loftus Versfeld, Pretoria
17:15	Try: Jason Jenkins 40'; Duncan Matthews 42'; Jaco Visagie 76'; Con: Tian Schoeman 40', 44', 77' (3/3); Pen: Tian Schoeman 5', 58', 65' (3/3); Cards: Jason Jenkins (yellow card) 21' to 31'	Report; Scoreboard	Try: Makazole Mapimpi 10'; Lionel Cronjé 24'; Malcolm Jaer 33'; Con: Lionel Cronjé 11', 25' (2/3); Pen: Lionel Cronjé 2', 72', 80' (3/3); Drop: Lionel Cronjé 66'; Cards: Wandile Mjekevu (yellow card) 27' to 37'; Giant Mtyanda (yellow card) 64' to 74'	Referee: Federico Anselmi

14 July 2017	Southern Kings	20–21	Cheetahs	Nelson Mandela Bay Stadium, Port Elizabeth
19:00	Try: Makazole Mapimpi 19'; Wandile Mjekevu 34'; Giant Mtyanda 43'; Con: Lionel Cronjé 20' (1/3); Pen: Lionel Cronjé 62' (1/1)	Report; Scoreboard	Try: Clinton Swart 67'; Raymond Rhule 69'; Con: Niel Marais 70' (1/2); Pen: Fred Zeilinga 5', 51' (2/2); Niel Marais 74' (1/1)	Referee: Shuhei Kubo

== Player statistics ==
The Super Rugby appearance record for players that represented the Kings in 2017 is as follows:

2017 Kings player statistics
Player name	JAG	SUN	STO	SHA	LIO	FOR	RED	WAR	REB	SHA	BRU	LIO	JAG	BUL	CHE	App	Try	Kck	Pts
Schalk Ferreira	1	1	1	1									17 (substituted in)	17 (substituted in)	17 (substituted in)	7	0	0	0
Mike Willemse	2	2	2	2	16 (substituted in)	2	2	2	16 (substituted in)				2	2	2	12	1	0	5
Ross Geldenhuys	3	3	3	3	3			3	3	3	3	3	3	3	3	13	0	0	0
Irné Herbst	4		5	4	4	4	19 (substituted in)	4	4	4	4	4	4	4		13	0	0	0
Mzwanele Zito	5	5				19 (substituted in)	4	19 (substituted in)	19 (substituted in)		19 (substituted in)			19 (substituted in)	19	8	0	0	0
Andisa Ntsila	6	6	20 (substituted in)	7	7	7	20 (substituted in)	8	8	8	8		8	8	8	14	1	0	5
Stefan Willemse	7	7		20 (substituted in)	20 (substituted in)				20 (substituted in)	20 (substituted in)	6	7				8	0	0	0
Ruaan Lerm	8	8	8	8	8	8	8									7	2	0	10
Louis Schreuder	9	9		9	9	9	9	9	9	9	9	9	9	9	9	14	1	0	5
Lionel Cronjé	10	10	10	10	10	10	10	10	10	10	10		10	10	10	14	2	126	136
Malcolm Jaer	11	11	11		15	15						15	15	15	15	9	6	0	30
Waylon Murray	12	12	13	12	12										23 (substituted in)	6	0	0	0
Berton Klaasen	13	13	23 (substituted in)	13	13	13	13	13	13	13	13	13	13	13	13	15	0	0	0
Makazole Mapimpi	14	14	14	14		11	11	11	11	11	11	11	11	11	11	14	11	0	55
Chrysander Botha	15										15					2	0	0	0
Martin Bezuidenhout	16 (substituted in)					16 (substituted in)	16 (substituted in)	20 (substituted in)	2	2	2	2	16 (substituted in)	16 (substituted in)	16 (substituted in)	11	1	0	5
Schalk van der Merwe	17 (substituted in)	17 (substituted in)	17 (substituted in)	17 (substituted in)	1	1	17 (substituted in)	17 (substituted in)	17 (substituted in)	1	1	1				12	0	0	0
Chris Heiberg	18 (substituted in)		18 (substituted in)		17 (substituted in)	17 (substituted in)	1			17 (substituted in)	17 (substituted in)					7	0	0	0
Tyler Paul	19 (substituted in)	4	4	19 (substituted in)	19 (substituted in)	20 (substituted in)	7	7	7	7	7	8	7	7	7	15	1	0	5
Chris Cloete	20 (substituted in)	20 (substituted in)	6	6	6	6	6	6	6	6		6	6	6	6	14	2	0	10
Rudi van Rooyen	21 (substituted in)	21 (substituted in)													21 (substituted in)	3	1	0	5
Masixole Banda	22 (substituted in)	15	15	15			15	15	15	15			21 (substituted in)	21 (substituted in)	22 (substituted in)	11	3	0	15
Luzuko Vulindlu	23 (substituted in)	22 (substituted in)	12		23 (substituted in)	12	12	12	12	12	12	12	12	12	12	14	3	0	15
Kurt Haupt		16 (substituted in)	16 (substituted in)	16 (substituted in)	2			16 (substituted in)		16 (substituted in)	16 (substituted in)	16 (substituted in)				8	0	0	0
Justin Forwood		18 (substituted in)		18 (substituted in)	18 (substituted in)	3	3	1	1							7	2	0	10
Thembelani Bholi		19 (substituted in)	7								20 (substituted in)	20 (substituted in)	20 (substituted in)	20 (substituted in)	20 (substituted in)	7	0	0	0
Pieter-Steyn de Wet		23 (substituted in)	22 (substituted in)	22	22 (substituted in)	23 (substituted in)	23 (substituted in)	23 (substituted in)	22 (substituted in)	22 (substituted in)	22 (substituted in)	10				10	2	16	26
Ricky Schroeder			9			21 (substituted in)										2	0	0	0
Wilhelm van der Sluys			19 (substituted in)	5	5	5	5	5	5	5		5	5		5	11	0	0	0
Johan Steyn			21 (substituted in)	21 (substituted in)	21 (substituted in)		21 (substituted in)	21 (substituted in)	21 (substituted in)	21 (substituted in)	21 (substituted in)					8	0	0	0
Alshaun Bock				11	11					14	14	14				5	2	0	10
Johann Tromp				23 (substituted in)												1	0	0	0
Yaw Penxe					14	14	14						23 (substituted in)	23 (substituted in)		5	2	0	10
Dayan van der Westhuizen						18 (substituted in)	18 (substituted in)	18 (substituted in)	18 (substituted in)	18 (substituted in)	18 (substituted in)	18 (substituted in)	18 (substituted in)	18 (substituted in)	18 (substituted in)	10	0	0	0
Wandile Mjekevu						22 (substituted in)	22 (substituted in)	14	14				14	14	14	7	3	0	15
Stokkies Hanekom								22 (substituted in)	23 (substituted in)	23 (substituted in)	23 (substituted in)	22 (substituted in)				5	0	0	0
Giant Mtyanda										19 (substituted in)	5	19 (substituted in)	19 (substituted in)	5	4	6	1	0	5
Mzamo Majola												17 (substituted in)	1	1	1	4	0	0	0
Stefan Ungerer												21 (substituted in)	22 (substituted in)	22 (substituted in)		3	0	0	0
Ntabeni Dukisa												23 (substituted in)				1	0	0	0
penalty try																–	2	–	14
Total																15	49	142	391

- Tango Balekile, Christiaan de Bruin, Siyanda Grey, Cameron Lindsay, Sintu Manjezi, Neil Maritz, Garrick Mattheus, Wandile Putuma and CJ Velleman were included in the 2017 squad, but were never included in a matchday squad.

== See also ==
- Southern Kings
- 2017 Super Rugby season
