= 2019 Currie Cup First Division =

Domestic rugby union competition

- Countries: South Africa, Argentina
- Date: 6 July – 31 August 2019
- Champions: Jaguares XV (1st title)
- Runners-up: Griffons
- Matches played: 31
- Tries scored: 270 (average 8.7 per match)
- Top point scorer: Domingo Miotti (Jaguares XV, 94)
- Top try scorer: Cody Basson (Griffons), Julián Domínguez (Jaguares XV) and Athi Mayinje (Eastern Province Elephants, 8)

The 2019 Currie Cup First Division – known as the Currie Cup sponsored by DirectAxis Financial Services for sponsorship reasons – was the second tier of the Currie Cup, the premier domestic rugby union competition in South Africa. It was the 81st edition of the competition organised by the South African Rugby Union and was played between 6 July and 31 August 2019.

The competition was won by the Jaguares, who beat the Griffons 27–13 in the final played on 31 August 2019.

== Competition rules and information ==
There were eight participating teams in the 2019 Currie Cup First Division. They played each other once during the pool stage, either at home or away. Teams received four points for a win and two points for a draw. Bonus points were awarded to teams that scored four or more tries in a game, as well as to teams that lost a match by seven points or less. Teams were ranked by log points, then points difference (points scored less points conceded).

The top four teams in the pool stage qualified for the semifinals, which were followed by a final.

== Teams ==
The teams that competed in the 2019 Currie Cup First Division are:

Location of teams in the 2019 Currie Cup First Division

2019 Currie Cup First Division teams
Team	Sponsored Name
Boland Cavaliers	Boland Cavaliers
Border Bulldogs	Border Bulldogs
Eastern Province Elephants	Eastern Province Elephants
Falcons	Valke
Griffons	Down Touch Griffons
Jaguares XV	Jaguares XV
Leopards	Leopards
SWD Eagles	SWD Eagles

== Regular season ==
=== Standings ===
The current standings in the 2019 Currie Cup First Division is:

2019 Currie Cup First Division standings
Pos	Team	Pld	W	D	L	PF	PA	PD	TF	TA	TB	LB	Pts	Qualification
1	Jaguares XV	7	7	0	0	483	119	+364	71	17	7	0	35	Play-offs
2	Griffons	7	3	3	1	245	199	+46	34	28	5	1	24	Play-offs
3	Eastern Province Elephants	7	4	0	3	171	177	−6	26	22	2	2	20	Play-offs
4	Falcons	7	3	2	2	176	251	−75	26	37	4	0	20	Play-offs
5	Leopards	7	3	0	4	149	204	−55	23	28	3	1	16	
6	Boland Cavaliers	7	2	1	4	179	200	−21	25	30	3	1	14	
7	SWD Eagles	7	1	2	4	160	260	−100	19	39	4	2	14	
8	Border Bulldogs	7	1	0	6	138	291	−153	21	44	2	0	6	

=== Round-by-round ===
The table below shows each team's progression throughout the season. For each round, each team's cumulative points total is shown with the overall log position in brackets.

Team Progression
Team	R1	R2	R3	R4	R5	R6	R7	SF	F
Jaguares XV	5 (2nd)	10 (1st)	15 (1st)	20 (1st)	25 (1st)	30 (1st)	35 (1st)	Won	Won
Griffons	2 (6th)	6 (4th)	9 (4th)	12 (4th)	17 (3rd)	22 (2nd)	24 (2nd)	Won	Lost
Eastern Province Elephants	1 (7th)	2 (7th)	7 (5th)	7 (7th)	12 (5th)	16 (4th)	20 (3rd)	Lost	—
Falcons	3 (4th=)	8 (3rd)	12 (2nd)	15 (2nd)	20 (2nd)	20 (3rd)	20 (4th)	Lost	—
Leopards	4 (3rd)	4 (6th)	5 (7th)	10 (6th)	11 (6th)	16 (5th)	16 (5th)	—	—
Boland Cavaliers	5 (1st)	5 (5th)	7 (6th)	12 (3rd)	12 (4th)	12 (6th)	14 (6th)	—	—
SWD Eagles	3 (4th=)	8 (2nd)	11 (3rd)	11 (5th)	11 (7th)	12 (7th)	14 (7th)	—	—
Border Bulldogs	0 (8th)	0 (8th)	0 (8th)	1 (8th)	1 (8th)	1 (8th)	6 (8th)	—	—
Key:	win	draw	loss	bye					

=== Matches ===
The following matches were played in the 2019 Currie Cup First Division:

==== Round One ====
6 July 2019	Boland Cavaliers	31–20	Border Bulldogs	King Edward Stadium, Montagu
14:30	Try: Clinton Theron; Valentino Wellman (3); Warren Williams; Con: Garrick Mattheus; Joshua Vermeulen (2)	Scoreboard	Try: Athenkosi Khethani; Billy Dutton; Lelethu Gcilitshana; Con: Aphiwe Stemele; Pen: Aphiwe Stemele	Referee: Marius van der Westhuizen

6 July 2019	Leopards	15–12	Eastern Province Elephants	Olën Park, Potchefstroom
15:00	Try: Edmund Rheeder; Pienaar van Niekerk; Con: SW Oosthuizen; Pen: SW Oosthuizen	Scoreboard	Try: Riaan Arends; Meli Rokoua; Con: Oliver Zono	Referee: Egon Seconds

6 July 2019	Griffons	43–50	Jaguares XV	HT Pelatona Projects Stadium, Welkom
15:00	Try: Cody Basson; Arthur Williams; Domenic Smit (2); Nkosi Nofuma; Ethan Williams; Con: Jaywinn Juries (3); Domenic Smit; Robbie Petzer; Pen: Jaywinn Juries	Scoreboard	Try: José Luis González; Gregorio del Prete (2); Teo Castiglioni; Julián Domínguez; Tomás Cubilla; Juan Pablo Castro; Con: Martín Elías (6); Pen: Martín Elías	Referee: Stuart Berry

6 July 2019	Falcons	33–33	SWD Eagles	Bosman Stadium, Brakpan
15:30	Try: Martin Sithole; Anrich Richter; Coert Cronjé; Andries Truter; Thabo Mabuza; Con: Anrich Richter (4)	Scoreboard	Try: Buran Parks; Dillin Snel; Vuyo Mbotho; Shario Rosenkrantz (2); Con: Gerhard Nortier; Leighton Eksteen (3)	Referee: AJ Jacobs

==== Round Two ====
12 July 2019	SWD Eagles	38–18	Leopards	Outeniqua Park, George
19:00	Try: Etienne Oosthuizen; Marquit September; Vuyo Mbotho; Shario Rosenkrantz (2); Con: Gerhard Nortier (5); Drop: Leighton Eksteen	Scoreboard	Try: Robert Hunt; Danny du Plooy; Reuben du Plooy; Drop: Boela Abrahams	Referee: Cwengile Jadezweni

13 July 2019	Border Bulldogs	19–36	Falcons	Police Park, East London
13:30	Try: Vuyisani Mavuso; Sethu Tom; Sonwabiso Mqalo; Con: Aphiwe Stemele (2)	Scoreboard	Try: Thabo Mabuza (2); Friedle Olivier; Grant Janke; Coert Cronjé; Con: Anrich Richter (2); Errol Jaggers (2); Pen: Anrich Richter	Referee: Pablo DeLuca

13 July 2019	Jaguares XV	54–17	Boland Cavaliers	Fanie du Toit Sport Ground, Potchefstroom
14:00	Try: Facundo Cordero (2); Agustín Segura; Bautista Ezcurra; Santiago Carreras; Gonzalo Bertranou penalty try Con: Martín Elías (3); Juan Cruz Mallia; Pen: Martín Elías (3)	Scoreboard	Try: Neil Rautenbach; Warren Williams; Con: Joshua Vermeulen; Liam McLoughlin; Pen: Joshua Vermeulen	Referee: Divan Uys

13 July 2019	Eastern Province Elephants	19–23	Griffons	Wolfson Stadium, KwaZakele
15:00	Try: Keanu Vers; Athi Mayinje (2); Con: Oliver Zono (2)	Scoreboard	Try: Jean Pretorius; Allistair Mumba; Domenic Smit; Con: Robbie Petzer; Pen: Jaywinn Juries; Drop: Danrich Visagie	Referee: Paul Mente

==== Round Three ====
20 July 2019	Boland Cavaliers	38–39	Eastern Province Elephants	Caledon Sports Grounds, Caledon
14:30	Try: Neil Rautenbach; Tapiwa Tsomondo; Valentino Wellman; Joshua Vermeulen; Jordan Holgate; Con: Garrick Mattheus (5); Pen: Garrick Mattheus	Scoreboard	Try: Zingisa April; Richman Gora; Oliver Zono; Athi Mayinje; Sphu Msutwana; Thembekile Boltina; Danny Benjamin; Con: Oliver Zono (2)	Referee: Cwengile Jadezweni

20 July 2019	Border Bulldogs	12–78	Jaguares XV	Police Park, East London
15:00	Try: Onke Dubase; Lelethu Gcilitshana; Con: Aphiwe Stemele	Scoreboard	Try: Leonel Oviedo; Lucio Sordoni; Julián Domínguez (3); Juan Pablo Castro (2); Facundo Cordero (3); José Luis González; Teo Castiglioni; Con: Domingo Miotti (9)	Referee: Griffin Colby

20 July 2019	Griffons	36–36	SWD Eagles	HT Pelatona Projects Stadium, Welkom
15:00	Try: Ludio Williams; Cody Basson; Jaywinn Juries; Allistair Mumba; Arthur Williams; Mario Wilson; Con: Jaywinn Juries (2); Danrich Visagie	Scoreboard	Try: Etienne Oosthuizen; Freginald Africa; Curshwon Mono; Shane Ball (2); Con: Gerhard Nortier (4); Pen: Gerhard Nortier	Referee: Divan Uys

20 July 2019	Leopards	7–12	Falcons	Olën Park, Potchefstroom
15:00	Try: Tjaart Benade; Con: Chuiner van Rooyen	Scoreboard	Try: Coert Cronjé; Friedle Olivier; Con: Andrew van Wyk	Referee: Ruhan Meiring

==== Round Four ====
26 July 2019	SWD Eagles	3–32	Boland Cavaliers	Outeniqua Park, George
19:00	Pen: Divan Nel	Scoreboard	Try: Kenan Cronjé; Michaine Fick; Warren Williams (2); Con: Garrick Mattheus (3); Pen: Garrick Mattheus (2)	Referee: Griffin Colby

27 July 2019	Falcons	31–31	Griffons	Bosman Stadium, Brakpan
15:00	Try: Thabo Mabuza; Friedle Olivier; Andrew van Wyk; Coert Cronjé; Con: Anrich Richter (4); Pen: Anrich Richter	Scoreboard	Try: Allistair Mumba; Duncan van Vuuren; Chadley Wenn; Jean Pretorius; Con: Danrich Visagie (4); Pen: Danrich Visagie	Referee: Quinton Immelman

27 July 2019	Leopards	38–29	Border Bulldogs	Olën Park, Potchefstroom
15:00	Try: Muziwandile Mazibuko; Reuben du Plooy; Bernu Engelbrecht; Luyanda Mngadi; Tjaart Benade; Nkululeko Mcuma; Con: Chuiner van Rooyen (4)	Scoreboard	Try: Soso Xakalashe; Bangi Kobese; Siphelele Zono; Onke Dubase; Con: Aphiwe Stemele (3); Pen: Aphiwe Stemele	Referee: Pablo DeLuca

27 July 2019	Eastern Province Elephants	15–54	Jaguares XV	Wolfson Stadium, KwaZakele
15:00	Try: Athi Mayinje (2); Con: Oliver Zono; Pen: Oliver Zono	Scoreboard	Try: Jerónimo Ureta Saenz Peña; Rodrigo Bruni; Gonzalo Bertranou (2); Domingo Miotti; Facundo Cordero; Franco Molina penalty try Con: Domingo Miotti (6)	Referee: AJ Jacobs

==== Round Five ====
3 August 2019	Boland Cavaliers	17–31	Falcons	Esselen Park, Worcester
14:00	Try: Adriaan Ludick; Valentino Wellman; Gavern Skippers; Con: Garrick Mattheus	Scoreboard	Try: Robey Leibrandt; Thabo Mabuza (2); Wihan Jacobs; Rodney Damons; Con: Anrich Richter (2); André du Plessis	Referee: Ben Crouse

3 August 2019	Jaguares XV	83–3	SWD Eagles	Fanie du Toit Sport Ground, Potchefstroom
15:00	Try: Nicolás Solveyra; Leonel Oviedo; Ignacio Calas; Lucas Santa Cruz; Gonzalo Bertranou; Julián Domínguez (2); Juan Cruz Mallia (2); Bautista Delguy (3); Santiago Carreras; Con: Martín Elías (9)	Scoreboard	Pen: Divan Nel	Referee: Rasta Rasivhenge

3 August 2019	Border Bulldogs	12–37	Eastern Province Elephants	Mthatha Stadium, Mthatha
15:00	Try: Athenkosi Khethani; Lelethu Gcilitshana; Con: Aphiwe Stemele	Scoreboard	Try: Mihlali Mpafi; Sphu Msutwana; Ivan-John du Preez; Athi Mayinje (2); Wandile Putuma; Con: Oliver Zono (2); Pen: Oliver Zono	Referee: Archie Sehlako

3 August 2019	Griffons	47–28	Leopards	HT Pelatona Projects Stadium, Welkom
15:15	Try: Ethan Williams (2); Allistair Mumba; Duncan van Vuuren; Chadley Wenn; Domenic Smit; Con: Danrich Visagie (4); Pen: Danrich Visagie (3)	Scoreboard	Try: Tjaart Benade; Nkululeko Mcuma; Keagan Tait; Lungelo Gosa; Con: Chuiner van Rooyen (4)	Referee: Marius van der Westhuizen

==== Round Six ====
9 August 2019	SWD Eagles	21–27	Eastern Province Elephants	Outeniqua Park, George
19:00	Pen: Divan Nel (7)	Scoreboard	Try: Duan du Plessis; Lupumlo Mguca; Kevin Luiters; Con: Oliver Zono (3); Pen: Oliver Zono (2)	Referee: Egon Seconds

10 August 2019	Falcons	19–122	Jaguares XV	Bosman Stadium, Brakpan
14:30	Try: André du Plessis; Jasper Genis; André Grobler; Con: André du Plessis (2)	Scoreboard	Try: Nicolás Solveyra; Jerónimo Ureta Saenz Peña; Ignacio Calas; Francisco Gorrissen; Domingo Miotti; Julián Domínguez (2); Juan Cruz Mallia (2); Agustín Segura (4); Bautista Delguy; Santiago Carreras; Santiago Montagner (2); Ignacio Inchauspe; Con: Domingo Miotti (16)	Referee: Marius van der Westhuizen

10 August 2019	Leopards	33–24	Boland Cavaliers	Olën Park, Potchefstroom
14:30	Try: Giovanne Snyman; Boeta Vermaak; Marius Stander; Japie Kleinhans (2); Con: Chuiner van Rooyen (4)	Scoreboard	Try: Johannes Janse van Rensburg; Edwin Sass; Gavern Skippers; Con: Garrick Mattheus (3); Pen: Garrick Mattheus	Referee: Stephan Geldenhuys

10 August 2019	Griffons	45–15	Border Bulldogs	HT Pelatona Projects Stadium, Welkom
15:00	Try: Schalk van der Merwe; Jean Pretorius; Cody Basson (2); Robbie Petzer; Duan Pretorius; Con: Danrich Visagie (5); Domenic Smit; Pen: Danrich Visagie	Scoreboard	Try: Lelethu Gcilitshana; Siphelele Zono; Con: Aphiwe Stemele; Pen: Aphiwe Stemele	Referee: Quinton Immelman

==== Round Seven ====
16 August 2019	Jaguares XV	42–10	Leopards	Fanie du Toit Sport Ground, Potchefstroom
19:00	Try: Bautista Ezcurra; Tomás Cubilla (3); Juan Pablo Castro penalty try Con: Martín Elías (5)	Scoreboard	Try: HP Swart; Lungelo Gosa	Referee: Paul Mente

17 August 2019	Boland Cavaliers	20–20	Griffons	Saldanha Stadium, Saldanha Bay
14:00	Try: Garrick Mattheus; Shilton van Wyk; Gavern Skippers; Con: Garrick Mattheus; Pen: Garrick Mattheus	Scoreboard	Try: Vincent Maruping; Cody Basson; Ethan Williams; Con: Danrich Visagie; Pen: Danrich Visagie	Referee: Stuart Berry

17 August 2019	Border Bulldogs	31–26	SWD Eagles	Police Park, East London
15:00	Try: Thabo Ntunja; Athenkosi Khethani; Athenkosi Manentsa; Bangi Kobese; Sonwabiso Mqalo; Con: Dilolo Mapuko (3)	Scoreboard	Try: Franco Botha; Marquit September (2); Xavier Scholtz; Con: Divan Nel (3)	Referee: Griffin Colby

17 August 2019	Eastern Province Elephants	22–14	Falcons	WJ de Wet Stadium, Despatch
16:00	Try: Lindokuhle Welemu; Richman Gora; Athi Mayinje; Con: Oliver Zono (2); Pen: Oliver Zono	Scoreboard	Try: Friedle Olivier; Hardus Pretorius; Con: Errol Jaggers; André du Plessis	Referee: Egon Seconds

== Play-offs ==
=== Title play-offs ===
==== Semi-finals ====
24 August 2019	Griffons	62–31	Eastern Province Elephants	HT Pelatona Projects Stadium, Welkom
15:00	Try: Jean Pretorius; Cody Basson (2); Allistair Mumba (3); Duan Pretorius; Jaywinn Juries penalty try Con: Robbie Petzer (6); Pen: Robbie Petzer	Scoreboard	Try: Lindokuhle Welemu; Stephan de Wit; Meli Rokoua; Diego Williams; Con: Oliver Zono (4); Pen: Oliver Zono	Referee: Quinton Immelman

24 August 2019	Jaguares XV	37–29	Falcons	Fanie du Toit Sport Ground, Potchefstroom
15:00	Try: Leonel Oviedo; Lucio Sordoni; Domingo Miotti; Nicolás Solveyra; Con: Domingo Miotti (4); Pen: Domingo Miotti (3)	Scoreboard	Try: Martin Sithole; Anrich Richter; Rodney Damons; Coert Cronjé; Con: Anrich Richter (3); Pen: Anrich Richter	Referee: Egon Seconds

==== Final ====
30 August 2019	Jaguares XV	27–13	Griffons	Fanie du Toit Sport Ground, Potchefstroom
18:15	Try: Tomás Cubilla 18'; Facundo Cordero 30' penalty try 59'; Con: Domingo Miotti 18', 31'; Pen: Domingo Miotti 2', 68'	Scoreboard	Try: Cody Basson 64'; Con: Robbie Petzer 2652'; Pen: Robbie Petzer 7', 27'	Referee: Rasta Rasivhenge

=== Promotion play-off ===
6 September 2019	Pumas	49–5	Griffons	Mbombela Stadium, Mbombela
17:00	Try: Marko Janse van Rensburg (2); Ashlon Davids; Luther Obi (2); Alwayno Visagie; Con: Chris Smith (3); Devon Williams; Kobus Marais; Pen: Chris Smith (3)	Scoreboard	Try: Danrich Visagie	Referee: Cwengile Jadezweni

- Pumas remained in the Currie Cup Premier Division for 2020.
- Griffons remained in the Currie Cup First Division for 2020.

== Honours ==
The honour roll for the 2019 Currie Cup First Division was:

2019 Currie Cup First Division
Champions:	Jaguares XV (1st title)
Top points scorer:	Domingo Miotti, Jaguares XV (104)
Top try scorers:	Cody Basson, Griffons, Julián Domínguez, Jaguares XV and Athi Mayinje, Eastern Province Elephants (8)

== Players ==
The squads and player appearance and scoring statistics for the 2019 Currie Cup First Division are as follows:

Boland Cavaliers
Name	BDR	JAG	EPE	SWD	GFA	LEO	GRF	SF	F	App	Try	Con	Pen	DG	Pts
Arnout Malherbe	1	1	1	1	1	1	17 (substituted in)	—	—	7	0	0	0	0	0
Mac Muller	2	16 (substituted in)	16 (substituted in)	2	2	16 (substituted in)	2	—	—	7	0	0	0	0	0
Clinton Theron	3	3				18 (substituted in)		—	—	3	1	0	0	0	5
Adriaan Ludick	4		4	4	4	17 (substituted in)	4	—	—	6	1	0	0	0	5
Marlyn Williams	5	5	5	5	5			—	—	5	0	0	0	0	0
Tapiwa Tsomondo	6	6	6	6	6	6	6	—	—	7	1	0	0	0	5
Johannes Janse van Rensburg	7	4	8	8	8	5	7	—	—	7	1	0	0	0	5
Kenan Cronjé	8			7	7		8	—	—	4	1	0	0	0	5
Shirwin Cupido	9			21 (substituted in)	20 (substituted in)	20 (substituted in)		—	—	4	0	0	0	0	0
Garrick Mattheus	10		10	10	10	10	12	—	—	6	1	14	5	0	48
Valentino Wellman	11	11	11	11	11	11	11	—	—	7	5	0	0	0	25
Edwin Sass	12	12				13		—	—	3	1	0	0	0	5
Andries Viljoen	13	13	13	13	13	21 (substituted in)	13	—	—	7	0	0	0	0	0
Warren Williams	14	14		14	14			—	—	4	4	0	0	0	20
Shilton van Wyk	15	15	14			22 (substituted in)	14	—	—	5	1	0	0	0	5
Damian May	16 (substituted in)	19		16 (substituted in)			16 (substituted in)	—	—	3	0	0	0	0	0
Wayrin Losper	17 (substituted in)	17 (substituted in)	17 (substituted in)	17 (substituted in)	17 (substituted in)	19 (substituted in)	1	—	—	7	0	0	0	0	0
Thurlow Marsh	18 (substituted in)							—	—	1	0	0	0	0	0
Taine Booysen	19 (substituted in)	8	19 (substituted in)				19 (substituted in)	—	—	4	0	0	0	0	0
Gurshwin Africa	20 (substituted in)	9	9					—	—	3	0	0	0	0	0
Joshua Vermeulen	21 (substituted in)	10	15	22 (substituted in)	22 (substituted in)	15	22 (substituted in)	—	—	7	1	3	1	0	14
Jordan Holgate	22 (substituted in)	21 (substituted in)	21 (substituted in)		12	12	21 (substituted in)	—	—	6	1	0	0	0	5
Neil Rautenbach		2	2		16 (substituted in)	2		—	—	4	2	0	0	0	10
Brendon Esterhuizen		7	7	20 (substituted in)	21 (substituted in)			—	—	4	0	0	0	0	0
DJ Putter		18 (substituted in)	18 (substituted in)	19 (substituted in)	19 (substituted in)	4	5	—	—	6	0	0	0	0	0
Ricardo Duarttee		20 (substituted in)	20 (substituted in)	9	9	9	9	—	—	6	0	0	0	0	0
Liam McLoughlin		22 (substituted in)						—	—	1	0	1	0	0	2
Simon Raw			3	3	3		18 (substituted in)	—	—	4	0	0	0	0	0
Michaine Fick			12	12				—	—	2	1	0	0	0	5
Gavern Skippers			22 (substituted in)	15	15	14	15	—	—	5	3	0	0	0	15
Günther Janse van Vuuren				18 (substituted in)	18 (substituted in)	3	3	—	—	4	0	0	0	0	0
Alwyn Carstens						7		—	—	1	0	0	0	0	0
Conway Pretorius						8		—	—	1	0	0	0	0	0
Brendan Owen							10	—	—	1	0	0	0	0	0
Leighton Barends							20	—	—	0	0	0	0	0	0
Total										7	25	18	6	0	179

Border Bulldogs
Name	BOL	GFA	JAG	LEO	EPE	GRF	SWD	SF	F	App	Try	Con	Pen	DG	Pts
Yanga Xakalashe	1	1	1		1	1		—	—	5	0	0	0	0	0
Vuyisani Mavuso	2	2	2	2	2	2	2	—	—	7	1	0	0	0	5
Thabo Ntunja	3	3	3	17 (substituted in)	17 (substituted in)	17 (substituted in)	3	—	—	7	1	0	0	0	5
Ayabonga Nomboyo	4	4	4	18 (substituted in)	18 (substituted in)	18 (substituted in)	4	—	—	7	0	0	0	0	0
Athenkosi Khethani	5	5	5	5	5	5	5	—	—	7	3	0	0	0	15
Onke Dubase	6	6	6	19 (substituted in)	19 (substituted in)		19 (substituted in)	—	—	6	2	0	0	0	10
Billy Dutton	7	7	7	7	7	7	7	—	—	7	1	0	0	0	5
Athenkosi Manentsa	8	8				8	8	—	—	4	1	0	0	0	5
Bangi Kobese	9	9	9	9	9	9	9	—	—	7	2	0	0	0	10
Aphiwe Stemele	10	10	10	10	10	10	21 (substituted in)	—	—	7	0	9	3	0	27
Asithandile Mrubata	11	11	11			22 (substituted in)		—	—	4	0	0	0	0	0
Sethu Tom	12	12	12	12	12			—	—	5	1	0	0	0	5
Sonwabiso Mqalo	13	13					12	—	—	3	2	0	0	0	10
Lelethu Gcilitshana	14	14	14	14	14	13	13	—	—	7	4	0	0	0	20
Litha Nkula	15			21	21 (substituted in)	14	14	—	—	4	0	0	0	0	0
Lubabalo Lento	16	16 (substituted in)	16 (substituted in)	16 (substituted in)	16 (substituted in)	16 (substituted in)	16 (substituted in)	—	—	6	0	0	0	0	0
Thabo Ngcem	17 (substituted in)	17 (substituted in)	17 (substituted in)	3	3	3		—	—	6	0	0	0	0	0
Mihlali Mosi	18 (substituted in)	18 (substituted in)	18 (substituted in)	4	4	4	18 (substituted in)	—	—	7	0	0	0	0	0
Soso Xakalashe	19 (substituted in)	19 (substituted in)	8	8	8			—	—	5	1	0	0	0	5
Anele Zweni	20 (substituted in)	20 (substituted in)	20 (substituted in)	20 (substituted in)	20 (substituted in)	20 (substituted in)		—	—	6	0	0	0	0	0
Dilolo Mapuko	21 (substituted in)	21 (substituted in)	21 (substituted in)		22 (substituted in)	21 (substituted in)	10	—	—	6	0	3	0	0	6
Foxy Ntleki	22 (substituted in)	22 (substituted in)	13	13				—	—	4	0	0	0	0	0
Siphelele Zono		15	15	15	15	15	15	—	—	6	2	0	0	0	10
Ntokozo Vidima			19 (substituted in)	6	6	6		—	—	4	0	0	0	0	0
Mihlali Nchukana			22 (substituted in)	22 (substituted in)	13			—	—	3	0	0	0	0	0
Blake Kyd				1			1	—	—	2	0	0	0	0	0
Lutho Adonis				11	11	11	11	—	—	4	0	0	0	0	0
Monwabisi Mkhwakhwi						12	22	—	—	1	0	0	0	0	0
Siyanda Am						19 (substituted in)	6	—	—	2	0	0	0	0	0
Ntsikayomzi Daka							17 (substituted in)	—	—	1	0	0	0	0	0
Yongama Mkaza							20 (substituted in)	—	—	1	0	0	0	0	0
Total										7	21	12	3	0	138

Eastern Province Elephants
Name	LEO	GRF	BOL	JAG	BDR	SWD	GFA	GRF	F	App	Try	Con	Pen	DG	Pts
Luvuyo Pupuma	1								—	1	0	0	0	0	0
Mihlali Mpafi	2	2	2	2	2				—	5	1	0	0	0	5
Johan van Wyk	3	1			17 (substituted in)	17 (substituted in)	17 (substituted in)	17 (substituted in)	—	6	0	0	0	0	0
Wandile Putuma	4	4	4	4	18 (substituted in)	19 (substituted in)	18 (substituted in)	18 (substituted in)	—	8	1	0	0	0	5
Giant Mtyanda	5	5	5	5	5	5	5	5	—	8	0	0	0	0	0
Stephan de Wit	6	6	6		6	8	8	6	—	7	1	0	0	0	5
Jurie van Vuuren	7	7	7	7	7	7	7	7	—	8	0	0	0	0	0
Zingisa April	8	8	8	8	8			8	—	6	1	0	0	0	5
Richman Gora	9	20 (substituted in)	9	9	9	9	9	9	—	8	2	0	0	0	10
Oliver Zono	10	10	10	10	10	10	10	10	—	8	1	17	6	0	57
Riaan Arends	11	11			22 (substituted in)		22 (substituted in)	22 (substituted in)	—	5	1	0	0	0	5
Sonwabile Mantyoyi	12				13	22		21 (substituted in)	—	3	0	0	0	0	0
Meli Rokoua	13	13	13	13		13	13	13	—	7	2	0	0	0	10
Sphu Msutwana	14	14	14	14	11	14	14	11	—	8	2	0	0	0	10
Danny Benjamin	15		22 (substituted in)	22 (substituted in)	21 (substituted in)				—	4	1	0	0	0	5
Mzwanele Besman	16								—	0	0	0	0	0	0
Vukile Sofisa	17 (substituted in)	3	3	3	3	3	3	3	—	8	0	0	0	0	0
Anele Lungisa	18 (substituted in)			19 (substituted in)					—	2	0	0	0	0	0
Diego Williams	19 (substituted in)	19 (substituted in)	19 (substituted in)	6	19 (substituted in)	6	6	19 (substituted in)	—	8	1	0	0	0	5
Sonwabo Majola	20 (substituted in)	9							—	2	0	0	0	0	0
Stephan Zeelie	21	21 (substituted in)							—	1	0	0	0	0	0
Sherwin Slater	22								—	0	0	0	0	0	0
Ivan-John du Preez		12	12	12	12	12	12		—	6	1	0	0	0	5
Keanu Vers		15	15	15	15	15	15	15	—	7	1	0	0	0	5
Thembekile Boltina		16 (substituted in)	16 (substituted in)	16 (substituted in)	16 (substituted in)			2	—	5	1	0	0	0	5
Emile Klassen		17 (substituted in)	1	1	1	1	1	1	—	7	0	0	0	0	0
Lindokuhle Welemu		18 (substituted in)	18 (substituted in)	18 (substituted in)	4	4	4	4	—	7	2	0	0	0	10
Athi Mayinje		22 (substituted in)	11	11	14	11	11	14	—	7	8	0	0	0	40
Rob Lyons			17 (substituted in)	17 (substituted in)					—	2	0	0	0	0	0
Kevin Luiters			20 (substituted in)	20 (substituted in)	20 (substituted in)	20 (substituted in)	20	20 (substituted in)	—	5	1	0	0	0	5
Luvo Claassen			21 (substituted in)	21 (substituted in)					—	2	0	0	0	0	0
Duan du Plessis						2	2		—	2	1	0	0	0	5
Dandré Delport						16 (substituted in)	16 (substituted in)	16 (substituted in)	—	3	0	0	0	0	0
Lupumlo Mguca						18 (substituted in)			—	1	1	0	0	0	5
Karlo Aspeling						21 (substituted in)	21 (substituted in)	12	—	3	0	0	0	0	0
Shaun Basson							19 (substituted in)		—	1	0	0	0	0	0
Total										8	30	17	6	0	202

Falcons
Name	SWD	BDR	LEO	GRF	BOL	JAG	EPE	JAG	F	App	Try	Con	Pen	DG	Pts
Luxolo Koza	1	1	17 (substituted in)	17 (substituted in)	17 (substituted in)		17 (substituted in)	1	—	7	0	0	0	0	0
Robey Leibrandt	2	2	2	2	2		2	2	—	7	1	0	0	0	5
Heinrich Roelfse	3	3	3	3	3		3	3	—	7	0	0	0	0	0
Shane Kirkwood	4	4	4	4	4		4	4	—	7	0	0	0	0	0
Andrew Volschenk	5	5	5	5	5				—	5	0	0	0	0	0
Martin Sithole	6						19 (substituted in)	6	—	3	2	0	0	0	10
Boela Venter	7	7	8	7	7		7	7	—	7	0	0	0	0	0
Friedle Olivier	8	8	19 (substituted in)	8	8		5	8	—	7	4	0	0	0	20
Anrich Richter	9	9		9	9		9	9	—	6	2	15	3	0	49
Errol Jaggers	10	10	10	10	10		10	21 (substituted in)	—	7	0	3	0	0	6
Rodney Damons	11	11	11	11	21 (substituted in)		11	11	—	7	2	0	0	0	10
Grant Janke	12	12	12	12	12				—	5	1	0	0	0	5
Andrew van Wyk	13	13	13	13	22 (substituted in)		12	13	—	7	1	1	0	0	7
Coert Cronjé	14	14	14	15	14		14	14	—	7	5	0	0	0	25
Andries Truter	15							10	—	2	1	0	0	0	5
Marco Klopper	16 (substituted in)	16 (substituted in)	16 (substituted in)	16 (substituted in)	16 (substituted in)		16 (substituted in)	16 (substituted in)	—	7	0	0	0	0	0
Njabulo Gumede	17 (substituted in)	17 (substituted in)	1	1	1		1	17 (substituted in)	—	7	0	0	0	0	0
Wihan Jacobs	18 (substituted in)			19 (substituted in)	19 (substituted in)		8	19 (substituted in)	—	5	1	0	0	0	5
Thabo Mabuza	19 (substituted in)	6	6	6	6		6		—	6	6	0	0	0	30
Johan Pretorius	20 (substituted in)	20 (substituted in)	20 (substituted in)	20					—	3	0	0	0	0	0
Leighton van Wyk	21 (substituted in)	21 (substituted in)	21 (substituted in)	21	11		21 (substituted in)	12	—	6	0	0	0	0	0
Juandré Nel	22 (substituted in)	15	15		15		15	15	—	6	0	0	0	0	0
Jacques Alberts		18 (substituted in)	18 (substituted in)	18 (substituted in)	18 (substituted in)		18 (substituted in)	5	—	6	0	0	0	0	0
Ernst Ladendorf		19 (substituted in)	7						—	2	0	0	0	0	0
Hardus Pretorius		22 (substituted in)	22	14		14	22 (substituted in)	22	—	4	1	0	0	0	5
André du Plessis			9		20 (substituted in)	9	20 (substituted in)	20	—	4	1	4	0	0	13
Franzwa Schutte				22				18 (substituted in)	—	1	0	0	0	0	0
Lundi Ralarala					13		13		—	2	0	0	0	0	0
Nico van der Heever						1			—	1	0	0	0	0	0
Attie Joubert						2			—	1	0	0	0	0	0
Bart le Roux						3			—	1	0	0	0	0	0
Bercho Botha						4			—	1	0	0	0	0	0
JJ Scheepers						5			—	1	0	0	0	0	0
Damian Fuller						6			—	1	0	0	0	0	0
Carling Forwood						7			—	1	0	0	0	0	0
Jan-Hendrik Bosman						8			—	1	0	0	0	0	0
Hendrik Mulder						10			—	1	0	0	0	0	0
Jasper Genis						11			—	1	1	0	0	0	5
Gido Horn						12			—	1	0	0	0	0	0
Brandan Hewitt						13			—	1	0	0	0	0	0
Ruaan du Preez						15			—	1	0	0	0	0	0
Peet Vorster						16 (substituted in)			—	1	0	0	0	0	0
Gerhard Coetzee						17 (substituted in)			—	1	0	0	0	0	0
Hilton Gie						18 (substituted in)			—	1	0	0	0	0	0
Harry van Staden						19 (substituted in)			—	1	0	0	0	0	0
Marco Jansen van Vuren						20 (substituted in)			—	1	0	0	0	0	0
André Grobler						21 (substituted in)			—	1	1	0	0	0	5
Jan Botes						22 (substituted in)			—	1	0	0	0	0	0
Total										8	30	23	3	0	205

Griffons
Name	JAG	EPE	SWD	GFA	LEO	BDR	BOL	EPE	JAG	App	Try	Con	Pen	DG	Pts
Schalk van der Merwe	1	1	1	1	1	1				6	1	0	0	0	5
Anrich Alberts	2	2	2	2	2	16 (substituted in)	2	2	2	9	0	0	0	0	0
Doctor Booysen	3	18 (substituted in)	18 (substituted in)	18 (substituted in)	18 (substituted in)	3	3	3	3	9	0	0	0	0	0
Pieter Jansen van Vuren	4									1	0	0	0	0	0
Vincent Maruping	5	5	5	5	5	5	5	5	5	9	1	0	0	0	5
Jean Pretorius	6	6	6	20 (substituted in)	7	6	6	7	7	9	4	0	0	0	20
Ludio Williams	7	7	7	7	20 (substituted in)	19 (substituted in)	7	20 (substituted in)	20 (substituted in)	9	1	0	0	0	5
Cody Basson	8	8	8	8	8	8	8	8	8	9	8	0	0	0	40
Jaywinn Juries	9	9	9	21	21 (substituted in)	21 (substituted in)	21 (substituted in)	21 (substituted in)	21 (substituted in)	8	2	5	2	0	26
Danrich Visagie	10	10	10	13	13	13	13	13	13	9	0	15	6	1	51
Allistair Mumba	11	11	11	11	11	11	11	11	11	9	7	0	0	0	35
Arthur Williams	12	12	13	12	12	12	12	12	12	9	2	0	0	0	10
Duan Pretorius	13	13	12	15	15	15	15	15	15	9	2	0	0	0	10
Duncan van Vuuren	14			14	14	14	14			5	2	0	0	0	10
Domenic Smit	15	15	15	22 (substituted in)	22 (substituted in)	22 (substituted in)	22	22 (substituted in)	22 (substituted in)	8	4	2	0	0	24
Cameron van Heerden	16 (substituted in)	16 (substituted in)				20 (substituted in)				3	0	0	0	0	0
Barend Potgieter	17 (substituted in)	17 (substituted in)			17 (substituted in)	17 (substituted in)	1	17 (substituted in)	17 (substituted in)	7	0	0	0	0	0
Erich de Jager	18 (substituted in)	3	3	3	3					5	0	0	0	0	0
Gavin Annandale	19									0	0	0	0	0	0
Nkosi Nofuma	20 (substituted in)	19 (substituted in)	19 (substituted in)	19 (substituted in)	19 (substituted in)	7	19 (substituted in)	19 (substituted in)	19 (substituted in)	9	1	0	0	0	5
Ethan Williams	21 (substituted in)	21 (substituted in)	21 (substituted in)	9	9	9	9	9	9	9	4	0	0	0	20
Robbie Petzer	22 (substituted in)	22 (substituted in)	22 (substituted in)	10	10	10	10	10	10	9	1	9	3	0	32
Sibabalo Qoma		4	4	4	4	4	4	4	4	8	0	0	0	0	0
Mario Wilson		14	14					14	14	4	1	0	0	0	5
Thato Mavundla		20 (substituted in)	20 (substituted in)	6	6		20	6	6	6	0	0	0	0	0
Chadley Wenn			16 (substituted in)	16 (substituted in)	16 (substituted in)	2	16 (substituted in)	16 (substituted in)	16 (substituted in)	7	2	0	0	0	10
Neo Mohapi			17 (substituted in)	17				18 (substituted in)	18 (substituted in)	3	0	0	0	0	0
Boan Venter						18 (substituted in)				1	0	0	0	0	0
Quintin Vorster							17 (substituted in)	1	1	3	0	0	0	0	0
Dolph Botha							18 (substituted in)			1	0	0	0	0	0
penalty try										–	1	–	–	–	7
Total										9	44	31	11	1	320

Jaguares XV
Name	GRF	BOL	BDR	EPE	SWD	GFA	LEO	GFA	GRF	App	Try	Con	Pen	DG	Pts
Javier Díaz	1	1	1				17 (substituted in)	1	1	6	0	0	0	0	0
José Luis González	2	2	16 (substituted in)	16 (substituted in)						4	2	0	0	0	10
Martín Fernández Segurotti	3	3		18 (substituted in)	18 (substituted in)	3	3	18 (substituted in)	18 (substituted in)	8	0	0	0	0	0
Jerónimo Ureta Saenz Peña	4		4	4		4	19 (substituted in)	4	19 (substituted in)	7	2	0	0	0	10
Franco Molina	5			19 (substituted in)	5		5			4	1	0	0	0	5
Lautaro Bavaro	6	7	20 (substituted in)	7		7	20 (substituted in)	7	7	8	0	0	0	0	0
Francisco Gorrissen	7	6	6	6	6	6		8	6	8	1	0	0	0	5
Rodrigo Bruni	8	8		8	8	8				5	1	0	0	0	5
Gregorio del Prete	9	9	21 (substituted in)	21 (substituted in)	21 (substituted in)	9		9	9	8	2	0	0	0	10
Teo Castiglioni	10		22 (substituted in)				21 (substituted in)	22 (substituted in)		4	2	0	0	0	10
Julián Domínguez	11		11		11	11		11		5	8	0	0	0	40
Bautista Ezcurra	12	14		12		22 (substituted in)	12	12	12	7	2	0	0	0	10
Agustín Segura	13	13			13	13		13	13	6	5	0	0	0	25
Tomás Cubilla	14			13			13		14	4	5	0	0	0	25
Martín Elías	15	10			10		10		22 (substituted in)	5	0	23	4	0	58
Leonel Oviedo	16 (substituted in)	16 (substituted in)	2	2	2	2	2	2	2	9	3	0	0	0	15
Rodrigo Martínez	17 (substituted in)		18 (substituted in)	17 (substituted in)	17 (substituted in)	17 (substituted in)	1			6	0	0	0	0	0
Ignacio Calas	18 (substituted in)	4	5	5	4	5		5	5	8	2	0	0	0	10
Santiago Grondona	19 (substituted in)	19 (substituted in)	7		20 (substituted in)		6	19 (substituted in)	20 (substituted in)	7	0	0	0	0	0
Santiago Montagner	20 (substituted in)	20 (substituted in)	8	20 (substituted in)		20 (substituted in)	8	20 (substituted in)	8	8	2	0	0	0	10
Gonzalo Bertranou	21 (substituted in)	21 (substituted in)	9	9	9					5	4	0	0	0	20
Juan Pablo Castro	22 (substituted in)		13				15	15		4	4	0	0	0	20
Santiago Portillo		5			19 (substituted in)	19 (substituted in)	4		4	5	0	0	0	0	0
Facundo Cordero		11	14	11			11		15	5	7	0	0	0	35
Juan Cruz Mallia		12	12	15	12	12	22			5	4	1	0	0	22
Santiago Carreras		15	15	14	15	15				5	3	0	0	0	15
Lucio Sordoni		17 (substituted in)	3	3	3	18 (substituted in)	18 (substituted in)	3	3	8	2	0	0	0	10
Lucas Santa Cruz		18 (substituted in)	19 (substituted in)		7		7	6		5	1	0	0	0	5
Mateo Carreras		22 (substituted in)					14	14	11	4	0	0	0	0	0
Domingo Miotti			10	10	22 (substituted in)	10		10	10	6	3	37	5	0	104
Nicolás Solveyra			17 (substituted in)	1	1	1		17 (substituted in)	17 (substituted in)	6	3	0	0	0	15
Bautista Delguy				22 (substituted in)	14	14				3	4	0	0	0	20
Pablo Dimcheff					16 (substituted in)	16 (substituted in)	16 (substituted in)	16 (substituted in)	16 (substituted in)	5	0	0	0	0	0
Ignacio Inchauspe						21 (substituted in)	9	21 (substituted in)	21 (substituted in)	4	1	0	0	0	5
penalty try										–	4	–	–	–	28
Total										9	78	61	9	0	547

Leopards
Name	EPE	SWD	GFA	BDR	GRF	BOL	JAG	SF	F	App	Try	Con	Pen	DG	Pts
Nelius Theron	1							—	—	1	0	0	0	0	0
Marius Stander	2	2	2	16 (substituted in)	2	16 (substituted in)	16 (substituted in)	—	—	7	1	0	0	0	5
Robert Hunt	3	3		3	3	3	3	—	—	6	1	0	0	0	5
Danny du Plooy	4	4	4	4				—	—	4	1	0	0	0	5
HP Swart	5	5	5	5	5	5	4	—	—	7	1	0	0	0	5
Muziwandile Mazibuko	6	6	6	6	6	19 (substituted in)	5	—	—	7	1	0	0	0	5
Chaney Willemse	7	7				7		—	—	3	0	0	0	0	0
Edmund Rheeder	8	8	8	8	8	8	8	—	—	7	1	0	0	0	5
Boela Abrahams	9	9						—	—	2	0	0	0	1	3
Evardi Boshoff	10	10	10	10	10	10		—	—	6	0	0	0	0	0
Pienaar van Niekerk	11	11						—	—	2	1	0	0	0	5
Akhona Nela	12	12						—	—	2	0	0	0	0	0
Tjaart Benade	13	13	12	12	12	13	10	—	—	7	3	0	0	0	15
SW Oosthuizen	14	14						—	—	2	0	1	1	0	5
Chuiner van Rooyen	15	15	15	15	15	15	15	—	—	7	0	13	0	0	26
JC Genade	16	16 (substituted in)	16 (substituted in)	2	16 (substituted in)	2	2	—	—	6	0	0	0	0	0
Matimu Manganyi	17 (substituted in)	1	3					—	—	3	0	0	0	0	0
Mncedisi Dlwengu	18 (substituted in)	18 (substituted in)						—	—	2	0	0	0	0	0
Reuben du Plooy	19 (substituted in)	19 (substituted in)	7	7	7	18 (substituted in)	7	—	—	7	2	0	0	0	10
Nkosana Mathaba	20	20 (substituted in)	9					—	—	2	0	0	0	0	0
Jimmy Mpailane	21 (substituted in)					22 (substituted in)	22 (substituted in)	—	—	3	0	0	0	0	0
Keagan Tait	22	22 (substituted in)	14	14	14			—	—	4	1	0	0	0	5
Brendan Strydom		17 (substituted in)	1	1			18 (substituted in)	—	—	4	0	0	0	0	0
Nkululeko Mcuma		21 (substituted in)	13	13	13		21 (substituted in)	—	—	5	2	0	0	0	10
Luyanda Mngadi			11	11	11	21 (substituted in)		—	—	4	1	0	0	0	5
Komape Moloto			17 (substituted in)					—	—	1	0	0	0	0	0
Dylan Pieterse			18 (substituted in)	19 (substituted in)	4	4	19 (substituted in)	—	—	5	0	0	0	0	0
Edward Haas			19		19 (substituted in)	6	6	—	—	3	0	0	0	0	0
Bernu Engelbrecht			20 (substituted in)	9	9	12	12	—	—	5	1	0	0	0	5
Japie Kleinhans			21 (substituted in)			20 (substituted in)	13	—	—	3	2	0	0	0	10
Lungelo Gosa			22 (substituted in)	22	22 (substituted in)	14	14	—	—	4	2	0	0	0	10
JP Mans				17 (substituted in)				—	—	1	0	0	0	0	0
Wikus Groenewald				18 (substituted in)	17 (substituted in)	17 (substituted in)	17 (substituted in)	—	—	4	0	0	0	0	0
Giovanne Snyman				20 (substituted in)	20 (substituted in)	9	9	—	—	4	1	0	0	0	5
Boeta Vermaak				21 (substituted in)	21 (substituted in)	11	11	—	—	4	1	0	0	0	5
Stephan de Jager					1	1	1	—	—	3	0	0	0	0	0
Riaan May					18 (substituted in)			—	—	1	0	0	0	0	0
Eugene Hare							20 (substituted in)	—	—	1	0	0	0	0	0

SWD Eagles
Name	GFA	LEO	GRF	BOL	JAG	EPE	BDR	SF	F	App	Try	Con	Pen	DG	Pts
Juandre Digue	1	1	1	18 (substituted in)	1	1	1	—	—	7	0	0	0	0	0
Xavier Scholtz	2				2	16 (substituted in)	16 (substituted in)	—	—	4	1	0	0	0	5
Lwando Mabenge	3	3	17 (substituted in)	17 (substituted in)	3	17 (substituted in)	17 (substituted in)	—	—	7	0	0	0	0	0
Armand Grobler	4	4	4	5	5	4	4	—	—	7	0	0	0	0	0
Etienne Oosthuizen	5	5	5			5	5	—	—	5	2	0	0	0	10
Buran Parks	6	20 (substituted in)	20 (substituted in)	20 (substituted in)	7			—	—	5	1	0	0	0	5
Solomon Manxodidi	7	7	7	7	6	19 (substituted in)	19 (substituted in)	—	—	7	0	0	0	0	0
Wayne Wilschut	8	8	8	8	8	8	8	—	—	7	0	0	0	0	0
Dillin Snel	9	9	9	9				—	—	4	1	0	0	0	5
Gerhard Nortier	10	10	10					—	—	3	0	10	1	0	23
Curshwon Mono	11	22 (substituted in)	14	22 (substituted in)	22 (substituted in)	14	14	—	—	7	1	0	0	0	5
Marquit September	12	12	12	12	12	12	12	—	—	7	3	0	0	0	15
Vuyo Mbotho	13	13	13	13	13	13	13	—	—	7	2	0	0	0	10
Shario Rosenkrantz	14	14	11	11	11		21 (substituted in)	—	—	6	4	0	0	0	20
Leighton Eksteen	15	15						—	—	2	0	3	0	1	9
Reinhardt Stears	16 (substituted in)	2	16 (substituted in)	16 (substituted in)	20 (substituted in)	6	6	—	—	7	0	0	0	0	0
Dewald Dekker	17 (substituted in)	17 (substituted in)	3	3	17 (substituted in)	3	3	—	—	7	0	0	0	0	0
Kayden Kiewit	18 (substituted in)	18 (substituted in)	18 (substituted in)	1	18 (substituted in)			—	—	5	0	0	0	0	0
Marquin Smart	19 (substituted in)	19 (substituted in)	19 (substituted in)	4	4	7	7	—	—	7	0	0	0	0	0
Freginald Africa	20 (substituted in)	6	6	6		20 (substituted in)	20 (substituted in)	—	—	6	1	0	0	0	5
Divan Nel	21 (substituted in)	21 (substituted in)	22	10	10	10	10	—	—	6	0	3	9	0	33
Shane Ball	22 (substituted in)	11	15	14	14	15	15	—	—	7	2	0	0	0	10
Franco Botha		16 (substituted in)	2	2	16 (substituted in)	2	2	—	—	6	1	0	0	0	5
Mbembe Payi			21 (substituted in)	15	15	11	11	—	—	5	0	0	0	0	0
Ian Alexander				19 (substituted in)	19 (substituted in)	18	18 (substituted in)	—	—	3	0	0	0	0	0
Jason Liebenberg				21 (substituted in)	21 (substituted in)	21		—	—	2	0	0	0	0	0
Ryan van der Westhuizen					9	9	9	—	—	3	0	0	0	0	0
Ganfried May						22	22 (substituted in)	—	—	1	0	0	0	0	0
Total										7	19	16	10	1	160

(c) denotes the team captain. For each match, the player's squad number is shown. Starting players are numbered 1 to 15, while the replacements are numbered 16 to 23. If a replacement made an appearance in the match, it is indicated by (substituted in) . "App" refers to the number of appearances made by the player, "Try" to the number of tries scored by the player, "Con" to the number of conversions kicked, "Pen" to the number of penalties kicked, "DG" to the number of drop goals kicked and "Pts" refer to the total number of points scored by the player.

== Referees ==
The following referees officiated matches in the 2019 Currie Cup First Division:

2019 Currie Cup First Division referees
Stuart Berry • Griffin Colby • Ben Crouse • Pablo DeLuca • Stephan Geldenhuys • Quinton Immelman • AJ Jacobs • Cwengile Jadezweni • Ruhan Meiring • Paul Mente • Rasta Rasivhenge • Egon Seconds • Archie Sehlako • Divan Uys • Marius van der Westhuizen

== See also ==
- 2019 Currie Cup Premier Division
- 2019 Rugby Challenge
