= Stephan Greeff =

South African rugby union player

- Born: 24 December 1989 (age 36) Cape Town, South Africa
- Height: 1.97 m (6 ft 5 1/2 in)
- Weight: 114 kg (251 lb; 17 st 13 lb)
- School: Gill College, Somerset East
- University: Unisa, University of South Africa

Rugby union career
- Position: Lock
Youth career
- 2007: Eastern Province Country Districts
- 2008–2011: Western Province
Amateur team(s)
Years	Team	Apps	(Points)
2011	Maties	1	(0)
Senior career
Years	Team	Apps	(Points)
2010–2011	Western Province	6	(0)
2012–2013	Golden Lions XV	2	(0)
2012	Lions	5	(0)
2013	Golden Lions	2	(0)
2013	Leopards	2	(0)
2014–2015	Griquas	23	(0)
2016–2017	Pumas	23	(5)
2017–2019	Southern Kings	32	(5)
2017–2018	Eastern Province Elephants	2	(0)
- Correct as of 4 May 2019

Stephan Greeff (born 24 December 1989 in Cape Town) is a South African rugby union player who last played for the Southern Kings in the Pro14. His regular playing position is lock.

== Career ==
=== Youth and Varsity rugby ===
Greeff represented the Eastern Province Country Districts side at the 2007 Under-18 Academy Week competition before moving to Cape Town to join Western Province. He played for the Western Province U19 side in 2008 and for the Western Province U21 side in 2009 and 2010.

In 2011, he also made a single appearance for the Maties in the Varsity Cup.

=== Western Province ===
He made his senior debut for Western Province in the 2010 Vodacom Cup competition, coming on as a late substitute in their match against the Boland Cavaliers. He made another three appearances in that competition, as well as one in the 2011 Vodacom Cup and another in a compulsory friendly match against Boland Cavaliers prior to the 2011 Currie Cup Premier Division.

=== Lions / Golden Lions ===
He joined Johannesburg-based side the Golden Lions in 2012, where he was immediately included in their Super Rugby side, the Lions. He made his Super Rugby debut in the second match of the Lions' 2012 Super Rugby season, starting their match against the Hurricanes. He made one more start (against the Bulls), as well as three substitute appearances. He also made one appearance for the Golden Lions in the 2012 Vodacom Cup, but then suffered a leg fracture, which ruled him out of the remainder of the season.

He returned the following season, making one appearance in the 2013 Vodacom Cup and two in the 2013 Currie Cup Premier Division, but fell out of favour and joined the Leopards for a loan spell during the 2013 Currie Cup First Division and Griquas in 2014.

=== Pumas ===
He joined Nelspruit-based side the Pumas for the 2016 season.
