= Lionel Cronjé =

South African rugby union player

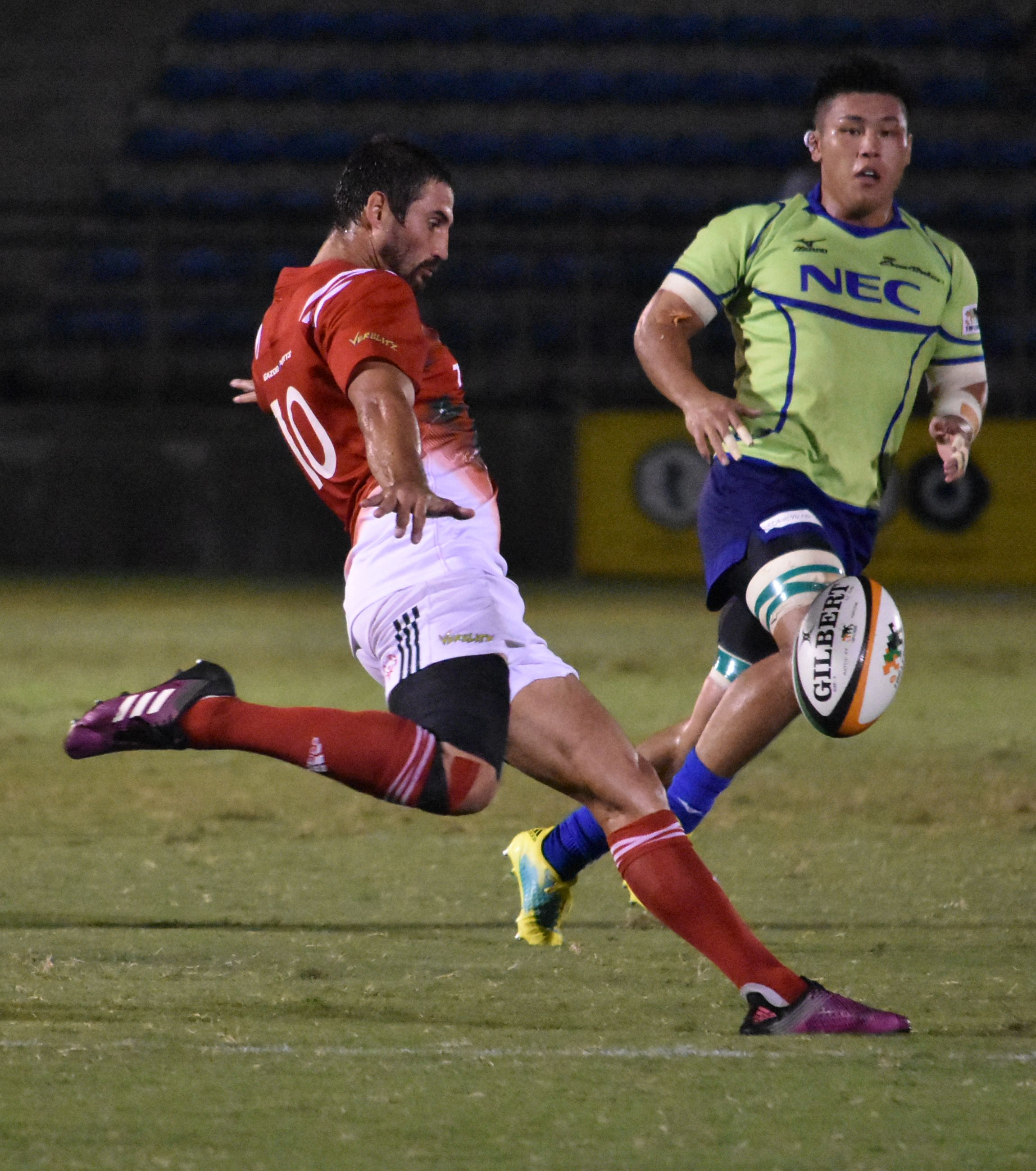
- Lionel Cronje in 2018
- Born: 25 May 1989 (age 37) Bloemfontein, Free State, South Africa
- Height: 1.84 m (6 ft 1/2 in)
- Weight: 92 kg (203 lb; 14 st 7 lb)
- School: Queen's College
- University: University of the Free State

Rugby union career
- Position: Fly-half / Centre / Fullback
- Current team: Sharks / Sharks
Youth career
- 2005–2007: Border Bulldogs
- 2008–2009: Free State Cheetahs
Amateur team(s)
Years	Team	Apps	(Points)
2009	UFS Shimlas	3	(10)
Senior career
Years	Team	Apps	(Points)
2009	Free State Cheetahs	0	(0)
2010–2011	Stormers	7	(32)
2010–2011	Western Province	21	(135)
2012	Blue Bulls	5	(0)
2013	Golden Lions XV	5	(19)
2013	Golden Lions	5	(0)
2014	Brumbies	10	(32)
2014–2015	Sharks (Currie Cup)	16	(81)
2015	Sharks XV	2	(8)
2015	Sharks	7	(22)
2017	Southern Kings	14	(136)
2017–2022	Toyota Verblitz	50	(458)
2021	→ Sharks (Currie Cup)	8	(27)
2022–	Sharks	7	(14)
2023–	Sharks (Currie Cup)		
- Correct as of 15 January 2023
International career
Years	Team	Apps	(Points)
2009	South Africa Under-20	4	(29)
2017	South Africa 'A'	2	(4)
- Correct as of 22 April 2018

Lionel Cronjé (born 25 May 1989) is a South African rugby union footballer, currently playing for The Sharks in the Carling Currie Cup. He is a versatile back-line player who can operate as a fly-half or full-back.

== Career ==
Cronjé previously played for the Stormers and Western Province before making the move north ahead of the 2012 Super Rugby season. He could play only five matches for the Blue Bulls due to a chest injury suffered in a gruesome wrestling match outside of Hatfield Square with Trevor Nyakane February 2012.

He joined the Lions for 2013 and the Brumbies for 2014.

He returned to South Africa later in 2014, signing a two-year deal with Durban-based side the Sharks. He was released by the Sharks in November 2015.

He joined Japanese Top League side Toyota Verblitz for the 2017–18 season.
