= Lupumlo Mguca =

South African rugby union player

- Born: 25 April 1997 (age 29) Port Elizabeth, South Africa
- Height: 1.73 m (5 ft 8 in)
- Weight: 109 kg (240 lb; 17 st 2 lb)
- School: HTS Daniel Pienaar, Uitenhage and Burnside High School, Christchurch

Rugby union career
- Position: Prop
Youth career
- 2010–2018: Eastern Province Elephants
Senior career
Years	Team	Apps	(Points)
2017–2021	Eastern Province Elephants	15	(15)
2018–2020	Southern Kings	12	(5)
2021–	Beaune	11	(5)
- Correct as of 27 March 2022
International career
Years	Team	Apps	(Points)
2014	South Africa Schools	3	(0)
- Correct as of 31 August 2018

Lupumlo Mguca (born 25 April 1997) is a South African rugby union player for the Southern Kings in the Pro14 and the Eastern Province Elephants in the Currie Cup. His regular position is prop.
