= Jurie van Vuuren =

South African rugby union player

- Full name: Jurie George van Vuuren
- Born: 7 June 1993 (age 33) Ladybrand, South Africa
- Height: 1.93 m (6 ft 4 in)
- Weight: 100 kg (220 lb; 15 st 10 lb)
- School: Oakdale Agricultural High School, Riversdale

Rugby union career
- Position: Lock / Flanker
- Current team: Utah Warriors
Youth career
- 2012–2014: Western Province
Amateur team(s)
Years	Team	Apps	(Points)
2013	Maties	3	(0)
Senior career
Years	Team	Apps	(Points)
2014–2016	Stormers	8	(0)
2014–2017	Western Province	46	(15)
2017–2019	Southern Kings	12	(0)
2018–2019	Eastern Province Elephants	15	(0)
2020–present	Utah Warriors	0	(0)
- Correct as of 16 July 2023

Jurie George van Vuuren (born 7 June 1993) is a South African rugby union player who plays for the Tel Aviv Heat. He also plays for the Utah Warriors in Major League Rugby (MLR). His regular position is lock or flanker.

He previously played for the Eastern Province Elephants in the Currie Cup and in the Rugby Challenge He also was a member of the Southern Kings.

== Career ==
With no prior senior experience, Van Vuuren joined the Stormers' touring squad during the 2014 Super Rugby season following several injuries to first team players. He made his debut for the Stormers in their 25–15 loss to the Brumbies in Canberra by coming on as a second-half substitute. He was named in the starting line-up for the Stormers' next match, against the Reds in Brisbane.
