= Rudi van Rooyen =

South African rugby union footballer (born 1992)

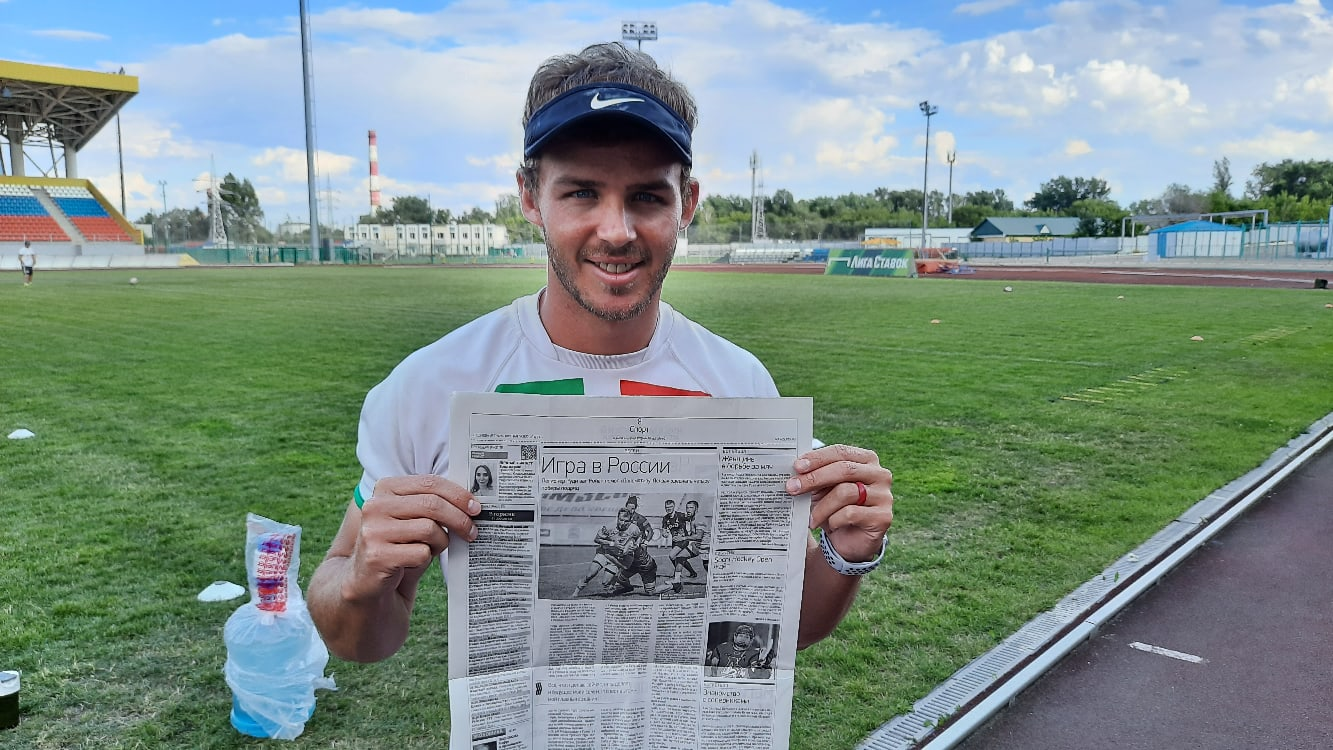
- Van Rooyen in 2020
- Born: 5 January 1992 (age 34) Pretoria, South Africa
- Height: 1.84 m (6 ft 1/2 in)
- Weight: 89 kg (196 lb; 14 st 0 lb)
- School: Afrikaanse Hoër Seunskool, Pretoria
- University: University of South Africa

Rugby union career
- Position: Scrum-half
- Current team: Lokomotiv-Penza
Youth career
- 2005–2013: Blue Bulls
Amateur team(s)
| Years | Team | Apps | (Points) |
| 2012 | UP Tuks | 4 | (0) |
Senior career
| Years | Team | Apps | (Points) |
| 2012–2014 | Blue Bulls | 4 | (0) |
| 2014–2017 | Griquas | 32 | (50) |
| 2017–2019 | Southern Kings | 27 | (10) |
| 2017 | Eastern Province Kings | 2 | (0) |
| 2019–present | Lokomotiv Penza | 0 | (0) |
- Correct as of 4 May 2019
International career
| Years | Team | Apps | (Points) |
| 2010 | S.A. Under-18 | | |
- Correct as of 15 October 2014

Rudi "Poerie" van Rooyen (born 5 January 1992) is a South African rugby union player for Lokomotiv-Penza in the Professional Rugby League in Russia. His regular position is scrum-half.

== Career ==
=== Youth and Varsity Cup rugby ===
Van Rooyen represented the Blue Bulls at the annual Craven Week tournaments both at primary school and secondary school levels, playing at the Under-13 edition in 2005 and progressing to the Under-18 competition in 2010. He scored a try in his only appearance at the senior event in a 23–20 defeat to the Golden Lions' Under-18s in Welkom.

Van Rooyen was also involved at Under-19 level later in 2010, making six appearances in the Blue Bulls U19's 2010 Under-19 Provincial Championship campaign. He returned for the Under-19s for the 2011 Under-19 Provincial Championship, scoring two tries as they finished runners-up in the competition. During the same period, he also made the step up to the Under-21s, playing in three matches during the 2011 Under-21 Provincial Championship.

In 2012, Van Rooyen was named in the UP Tuks side that played in the 2012 Varsity Cup tournament. He played in their final two pool matches, as well as in their 53–24 semi-final victory over NWU Pukke and the final itself, coming on in the last few minutes to help Tuks see out the game and beat Maties 29–21 to clinch their first ever Varsity Cup title.

=== Blue Bulls ===
Van Rooyen made his first class debut during March 2012, coming on as a substitute in the Blue Bulls' 2012 Vodacom Cup clash against Griquas in Pretoria. He made two more appearances off the bench during the competition, in their matches against the Golden Lions and the Leopards.

Van Rooyen made no appearances for the remainder of 2012 or the first half of 2013, but returned to action for the Blue Bulls U21 side during the 2013 Under-21 Provincial Championship, which saw him score a brace of tries in two different matches (a 59–17 win against the Leopards U21 in Potchefstroom and a 40–27 victory over the Free State XV in Pretoria) and making a total of twelve starts.

Van Rooyen returned to first class action during the 2014 Vodacom Cup as he played in the final few minutes of the Blue Bulls' match against the Falcons.

=== Griquas ===
After the 2014 Vodacom Cup competition, Van Rooyen moved to Kimberley to join Griquas on a deal until the end of 2014. During July of the same year, he represented his new side twice during the 2014 Currie Cup qualification tournament, making appearances from the bench against the Falcons and the SWD Eagles, as Griquas won the qualification tournament to secure a place in the 2014 Currie Cup Premier Division.

Despite that being his only involvement in the first team, Griquas announced at the start of October that Van Rooyen signed a contract extension to remain in Kimberley for the 2015 season. A few days later, he also got his first opportunity to play in the Premier Division of the Currie Cup, coming on as a late substitute in their final match of the season against his former side, the Blue Bulls in a 46–12 defeat.
