= Mike Willemse =

South African rugby union player

- Full name: Michael Evan Willemse
- Born: 14 February 1993 (age 33) Cape Town, South Africa
- Height: 1.85 m (6 ft 1 in)
- Weight: 104 kg (229 lb; 16 st 5 lb)
- School: Grey High School, Port Elizabeth
- University: University of Cape Town

Rugby union career
- Position: Hooker
- Current team: Southern Kings
Youth career
- 2010–2011: Eastern Province Kings
Amateur team(s)
Years	Team	Apps	(Points)
2013	UCT Ikey Tigers	6	(15)
Senior career
Years	Team	Apps	(Points)
2013–2016	Western Province	36	(20)
2014–2016	Stormers	4	(0)
2016–2017	Eastern Province Kings	6	(10)
2017–2019	Southern Kings	42	(40)
2017	Golden Lions	5	(0)
2019–2021	Edinburgh	40	(30)
2021–	London Irish	15	(10)
- Correct as of 31 May 2022
International career
Years	Team	Apps	(Points)
2013	South Africa Under-20	5	(10)
- Correct as of 17 April 2018

Michael Evan Willemse (born 14 February 1993) is a South African rugby union player for Ealing Trailfinders in Championship Rugby. His regular position is hooker.

== Career ==
=== Youth and Varsity Rugby ===
Willemse was included in the Eastern Province Kings squad at the 2010 Under-18 Academy Week and also played for the Eastern Province U19 team in the Under-19 Provincial Championship competition in the same year. In 2011, he also represented them at the Craven Week competition.

In 2013, he played Varsity Cup rugby with the UCT Ikey Tigers, scoring three tries in six starts.

=== Western Province / Stormers ===
He was called up to the Western Province Vodacom Cup squad at the conclusion of the Varsity Cup competition and made his first class debut on 13 April 2013 against Argentina side Pampas XV and made four appearances in the competition.

He made his Currie Cup debut a few months later when he came off the substitutes' bench for their match against Sharks following Tiaan Liebenberg's late withdrawal through injury.

In 2014, he was called up into the Stormers squad for their 2014 Super Rugby match against the Sharks, following Deon Fourie's late withdrawal through injury.

=== UK ===
On 25 March 2019, Willemse traveled to Scotland to sign for Edinburgh in the Pro14 on a two-year deal from the 2019-20 season. Following his release from Edinburgh, he signed for English club London Irish in the Premiership Rugby from the 2021-22 season.

=== Representative rugby ===
In 2013, he was included in the South Africa Under-20 squad for the 2013 IRB Junior World Championship. He made three substitute appearance – against the USA (scoring two tries), England, and France.
