= Berton Klaasen =

South African rugby union player

- Full name: Berton Wesley Klaasen
- Born: 24 January 1990 (age 36) Somerset West, South Africa
- Height: 1.87 m (6 ft 1 1/2 in)
- Weight: 99 kg (218 lb; 15 st 8 lb)
- School: Somerset West High School

Rugby union career
- Position: Centre
- Current team: Griquas
Youth career
- 2007–2008: Boland Cavaliers
- 2009–2011: Western Province
Amateur team(s)
Years	Team	Apps	(Points)
2011	Maties	2	(0)
Senior career
Years	Team	Apps	(Points)
2011–2013	Western Province	24	(10)
2016	Western Province	4	(0)
2016–2017	Eastern Province Kings	8	(10)
2017–2019	Southern Kings	53	(25)
2020–	Griquas	5	(0)
- Correct as of 3 March 2021

Berton Wesley Klaasen is a South African rugby union player who last played for the Southern Kings in the Pro14. His usual position is centre.
