= Meli Rokoua =

Fijian rugby union player (born 1994)

- Born: 24 July 1994 (age 32) Nadi, Fiji
- School: Ratu Navula College

Rugby union career
- Position: Utility player
- Current team: Eastern Province Elephants
Senior career
Years	Team	Apps	(Points)
2016–2018	Agronomia		
2018–2019	Southern Kings	11	(0)
2019–present	Eastern Province Elephants	11	(15)
- Correct as of 25 August 2019

Meli Rokoua (born 24 July 1994) is a Fijian rugby union player for South African side Eastern Province Elephants in the Currie Cup and in the Rugby Challenge. He is a utility player that can play as a centre, wing or loose forward.

He can play rugby sevens and was named in an extended Fiji national team in 2016. He was included in VVA Saracens in 2019, who play in the Russian rugby premier league.
