= Justin Forwood =

South African rugby union player

- Born: 19 September 1993 (age 33) Pretoria, South Africa
- Height: 1.91 m (6 ft 3 in)
- Weight: 126 kg (278 lb; 19 st 12 lb)
- School: Hoërskool Waterkloof, Pretoria
- University: University of Pretoria

Rugby union career
- Position: Prop
- Current team: Griquas
Youth career
- 2010–2014: Blue Bulls
Amateur team(s)
| Years | Team | Apps | (Points) |
| 2015–2016 | UP Tuks | 11 | (0) |
Senior career
| Years | Team | Apps | (Points) |
| 2015 | Blue Bulls | 1 | (0) |
| 2016 | Blue Bulls XV | 1 | (0) |
| 2016–2019 | Eastern Province Kings | 10 | (0) |
| 2017–2018 | Southern Kings | 17 | (10) |
| 2019–2021 | Soyaux Angoulême | 8 | (0) |
| 2022– | Griquas | 4 | (0) |
- Correct as of 10 July 2022

Justin Forwood (born 19 September 1993) is a South African professional rugby union player for French Pro D2 Soyaux Angoulême. His regular position is loosehead prop.

== Rugby career ==
=== 2010–2014: Youth rugby ===
Forwood was born and grew up in Pretoria. He attended and played first team rugby for Hoërskool Waterkloof, and was also to selected the Pretoria-based Blue Bulls union at the premier South African high schools rugby union competition, the Under-18 Craven Week, on two occasions – he made a single appearance at the 2010 tournament in Welkom and another one at the 2011 tournament in Kimberley.

After high school, Forwood joined the Blue Bulls academy and established himself as a key player for the Blue Bulls U19 team in the 2012 Under-19 Provincial Championship; he made eight starts and one appearance as a replacement during the round-robin stage of the competition, scoring four tries – two in their 90–0 win over SWD U19, and one each against the Leopards U19 and Sharks U19 – to help the Blue Bulls finish second on the log to qualify for the title play-offs. He started their semi-final against the Sharks, scoring two tries in a 46–35 victory, and the final against Western Province U19, where his side fell just short, losing the match 18–22. Forwood's six tries in the competition made him the Blue Bulls' top try scorer.

Forwood was named in the Blue Bulls squad for the 2013 Vodacom Cup, but didn't make any appearances in the competition. In the latter half of 2013, he represented the Blue Bulls U21 side in the 2013 Under-21 Provincial Championship; his first five appearances for the team all came off the bench, but he started their final four matches of the regular season, scoring a try in the first of those against Border U21. The Blue Bulls finished second on the log to qualify for the title play-offs, and Forwood started their semi-final win over the Sharks U21s, as well as the final, where the team again fell just short, losing 23–30 to Western Province U21.

Forwood made just four appearances for the team in the 2014 Under-21 Provincial Championship, scoring a try in their 31–10 victory over the Sharks in their penultimate match during the regular season. The team again finished in second place, but beat Western Province 20–10 in the final to win the championship.

=== 2015–2016: Blue Bulls / UP Tuks ===
At the start of 2015, Forwood played Varsity Cup rugby, making three appearances for a team that finished top of the log before losing to NWU Pukke in the semi-final, Forwood's only start for Tuks. He also joined the Blue Bulls' squad for the 2015 Vodacom Cup and he made his first class debut in May 2015, starting in an 83–13 victory over their affiliated sub-union, the Limpopo Blue Bulls.

Forwood made eight appearances during the UP Tuks' 2015 Varsity Cup season, helping the side reach the semi-finals for the second consecutive season before losing to Maties in the semi-final. He made his second senior appearance during the 2016 Currie Cup qualification competition, coming on as a replacement in a 95–12 victory over Namibian side Welwitschias in Pretoria.

=== 2016: Eastern Province Kings ===
In August 2016, Forwood was contracted by the cash-strapped Eastern Province Kings for the 2016 Currie Cup Premier Division. He made his debut in the Premier Division of the Currie Cup by coming on as a replacement in their first match of the season, a 10–28 defeat to Boland Cavaliers. He was promoted to the starting lineup for their next match against former side the Blue Bulls in his hometown of Pretoria. He started four of their remaining six matches in a season that saw the EP Kings fail to win any of their matches to finish bottom of the log.
