= Oliver Zono =

South African rugby union player

- Born: 26 November 1991 (age 34) Fort Beaufort, South Africa
- Height: 1.75 m (5 ft 9 in)
- Weight: 78 kg (172 lb; 12 st 4 lb)
- School: Eyabantu High School
- University: University of Fort Hare

Rugby union career
- Position: Fly-half
- Current team: Eastern Province Elephants
Youth career
- 2009–2010: Border Bulldogs
Amateur team(s)
Years	Team	Apps	(Points)
2013–2014	UFH Blues		
Senior career
Years	Team	Apps	(Points)
2014–2017	Border Bulldogs	44	(192)
2017–2018	Southern Kings	9	(23)
2019–present	Eastern Province Elephants	13	(87)
- Correct as of 25 August 2019

Oliver Zono (born 26 November 1991) is a South African rugby union player for the Eastern Province Elephants in the Currie Cup and in the Rugby Challenge. His regular position is fly-half. As of 2020 he plays for Krasny Yar Krasnoyarsk in Russia.

== Rugby career ==
=== Border Bulldogs ===
Zono was born and grew up in Fort Beaufort. He played youth rugby for the Border U19 team in the 2009 and 2010 Under-19 Provincial Championships, before representing the University of Fort Hare in the Varsity Shield competition in 2013 and 2014.

He made his first class debut for the Border Bulldogs in the 2014 Vodacom Cup, coming on as a replacement in their match against the Free State XV in Bloemfontein, before making his first start a fortnight later in their match against the Boland Cavaliers. He made five appearances in the 2014 Currie Cup qualification series – scoring his first senior try in a 40–54 defeat to the Falcons in Kempton Park. – and two further appearances in the Currie Cup First Division.

He established himself as a regular in the Border team, finishing the 2014 Currie Cup First Division competition as his team's top scorer, despite making just two appearances. He scored 17 points (one try and 12 points with the boot) in a 30–32 defeat to the Leopards, and 14 points in his next match – a 44–20 win over the Boland Cavaliers – via two tries and two conversions. He remained with the East London-based team until 2017, making a total of 44 appearances in four seasons.

=== Southern Kings ===
In August 2017, the Port Elizabeth-based Southern Kings franchise announced that they signed Zono for the 2017–18 Pro14 season, their first campaign in the competition after losing their Super Rugby membership. He made his debut in that competition as a replacement in their Round Two match against Connacht in Galway, and started their next match at home to Leinster. He made a total of nine appearances in his debut season, kicking seven conversions and three penalties for a personal points haul of 23 points.
