= Andisa Ntsila =

South African rugby union player

- Born: 7 November 1993 (age 33) Queenstown, South Africa
- Height: 1.81 m (5 ft 11 1/2 in)
- Weight: 98 kg (216 lb; 15 st 6 lb)
- School: Queen's College
- University: Nelson Mandela Metropolitan University

Rugby union career
- Position(s): Openside Flanker; Number 8
- Current team: Cheetahs / Free State Cheetahs
Youth career
- 2012: SWD U19
- 2013–2014: SWD U21
Amateur team(s)
Years	Team	Apps	(Points)
2015–2016	NMMU Madibaz	11	(5)
Senior career
Years	Team	Apps	(Points)
2015–2016	SWD Eagles	28	(20)
2016–2019	Southern Kings	49	(15)
2019	Sharks (Currie Cup)	2	(0)
2020	Sharks	0	(0)
2020–	Cheetahs	5	(5)
2020–	Free State Cheetahs	21	(35)
- Correct as of 10 July 2022
International career
Years	Team	Apps	(Points)
2017	South Africa 'A'	2	(0)
- Correct as of 22 April 2018

Andisa Ntsila (born 7 November 1993) is a South African professional rugby union player for the Sharks in the Currie Cup. His regular position is flanker or number eight.

== Rugby career ==
=== Youth rugby ===
Ntsila was born in Queenstown, where he attended Queen's College until 2011. He didn't earn any provincial call-ups to represent Border while at school and moved to George after high school, where he linked up with the SWD Eagles. He was included in their Under-19 squad that participated in Group A of the 2012 Under-19 Provincial Championship. Ntsila played in eight matches in a difficult season for SWD, which saw them finish bottom of Group A after losing all twelve of their matches and losing a relegation play-off match to Border U19 to be relegated to Group B.

Ntsila made three starts for SWD U21 in the Under-21 Provincial Championship the following season, where he once again found himself in a poor team, losing all seven of their matches in Group B of the competition. A much better season followed in 2014, as the team won five of their seven matches during the regular season to finish in third position on the log. Ntsila started six of those seven matches, scoring tries in victories over Limpopo Blue Bulls U21 and Falcons U21, on both occasions proving decisive in narrow victories. He also started their semi-final match against Boland U21, scoring his third try of the competition in a 40–33 victory, and the final against Eastern Province U21, where his team was outclassed by the unbeaten Eastern Province U21 team who won the match 46–3.

=== NMMU Madibaz / SWD Eagles ===
Ntsila played Varsity Cup rugby for NMMU Madibaz at the start of 2015, starting six of their seven matches in the number eight jersey. He scored one try in their match against Maties in a disappointing season for a NMMU side that finished second-last on the log.

Soon after the 2015 Varsity Cup finished, Ntsila was also included in the SWD Eagles squad for the 2015 Vodacom Cup. He made his first class debut on 17 April 2015, coming on as a replacement in the team's 36–13 victory over a Sharks XV in George. He was also named on the bench for their remaining four matches in the competition; three matches during the regular season which saw SWD finish in fourth position in the Southern Section, and their quarter-final match against the Golden Lions, which the team from Johannesburg won 29–21 to eliminate SWD from the competition.

Ntsila was also included in the SWD Eagles squad for their 2015 Currie Cup qualification campaign. He made his Currie Cup debut on 12 June in a match against the Leopards which ended in a 45–17 victory for the visitors. A week later, Ntsila made his first ever start in first class rugby, wearing the number seven jersey in their match against the Griffons in Welkom. A third appearance as a replacement followed against the Falcons in a competition that saw SWD finish bottom of the log, which meant they had to play in the First Division for the rest of the season. They lost their first match, but then recovered to win four matches in a row to finish in second position to qualify for the semi-finals, with Ntsila starting the final two of those matches. He dropped down to the replacement bench for their semi-final match against the Griffons, but came on shortly after half-time and scored his first Currie Cup try ten minutes later to help his side triumph 47–40 to set up a final against the Leopards in Potchefstroom. Ntsila again played off the bench in the final, but could not prevent the hosts winning the match 44–20 to win the title for the first time.

Ntsila made three starts and two substitute appearances for the NMMU Madibaz in the 2016 Varsity Cup, repeating the team's 2015 performance by finishing the season in second-last position. He again linked up with the SWD Eagles after the Varsity Cup for their 2016 Currie Cup qualification competition. He appeared in their first eleven matches of the competition – scoring one try in a 96–5 victory over Namibian side Welwitschias – before his short spell with the Southern Kings Super Rugby side.

=== Southern Kings ===
In July 2016, Ntsila was drafted into the Southern Kings Super Rugby squad and named on the bench for their Round Sixteen match against the Lions.
