= Ruaan Lerm =

South African rugby union player

- Full name: Ruaan Stephen Lerm
- Born: 25 March 1992 (age 34) Kempton Park, South Africa
- Height: 1.90 m (6 ft 3 in)
- Weight: 102 kg (225 lb; 16 st 1 lb)
- School: Hoërskool Dr. E.G. Jansen, Boksburg

Rugby union career
- Position: Number eight / Flanker
- Current team: Southern Kings
Youth career
- 2008–2010: Falcons
- 2011–2013: Golden Lions
Senior career
| Years | Team | Apps | (Points) |
| 2012–2016 | Golden Lions XV | 35 | (90) |
| 2014 | → Griquas | 8 | (5) |
| 2015–2016 | Lions | 3 | (0) |
| 2015–2016 | Golden Lions | 11 | (5) |
| 2017–present | Southern Kings | 40 | (20) |
- Correct as of 4 May 2019
International career
| Years | Team | Apps | (Points) |
| 2008 | South Africa Under-16 Elite Squad | | |
- Correct as of 22 April 2018

Ruaan Stephen Lerm (born 25 March 1992) is a South African rugby union player for the Southern Kings in the Pro14. His regular position is number eight or flanker.

== Career ==
=== Youth ===
Lerm played schools rugby for Hoërskool Dr. E.G. Jansen in Boksburg, which earned him call-ups to a few youth week tournaments for his local Falcons side. In 2008, he was selected in their squad for the Under-16 Grant Khomo Week in Ermelo, which also led to his inclusion in a South African Under-16 Elite squad training group. He then represented the Falcons in two consecutive Under-18 Craven Week competitions; the 2009 competition held in East London and the 2010 competition held in Welkom, where he scored a try in his only appearance against Border.

In 2011, Lerm made the short move from the Falcons to Johannesburg-based Golden Lions. Lerm played in all fourteen of the Golden Lions U19's matches during the 2011 Under-19 Provincial Championship, scoring five tries as they went all the way to final of the competition. In the final, they faced Gauteng rivals the Blue Bulls U19. Lerm played all 70 minutes as his side ran out 20–19 winners to clinch the championship in front of their home crown in Johannesburg.

Lerm moved up to the Under-21 age group in 2012 and made ten appearances for the Golden Lions U21 side in the 2012 Under-21 Provincial Championship (scoring two tries) and then made eleven starts during the 2013 Under-21 Provincial Championship, scoring five tries.

=== Golden Lions ===
His first class debut came in 2012, during the Vodacom Cup competition. He started in their opening match of the season against the Leopards in Potchefstroom, where they suffered a 23–16 defeat. After playing off the bench in the Golden Lions' 59–29 victory over his former side Falcons in their next match, he then started a further five matches during the competition. He made just one appearance during the 2013 Vodacom Cup, scoring his first senior try in the Golden Lions' 30–19 defeat to the Griffons in Welkom.

In the 2014 Vodacom Cup, he started in all nine matches of the Golden Lions' season as they made it all the way to the final, only to lose 30–6 in the final against Griquas in Kimberley. Lerm scored five tries in his nine matches, including two tries in their match against the Griffons.

=== Griquas ===
In 2014, Lerm made a loan move to Kimberley to join Griquas for the duration of the 2014 Currie Cup Premier Division, as part of the deal that saw Howard Mnisi in the opposite direction. He was named in the starting line-up for their Round Three match against the Pumas in Nelspruit and made a total of eight appearances.
