= Quinton Immelman =

South African rugby union referee

- Born: 31 March 1981 (age 45) Pretoria, South Africa
- Height: 1.89 m (6 ft 2 1/2 in)
- Weight: 94 kg (14 st 11 lb; 207 lb)

Rugby union career
Refereeing career
Years	Competition	Apps
2010–present	Vodacom Cup	
2011–present	Varsity Cup	
2011–present	Currie Cup	
2016–present	Super Rugby	

Quinton Immelman (born 31 March 1981 in Pretoria, South Africa) is a rugby referee on the Premier Panel of the South African Rugby Union.

In 2016, Immelman was added to the referees' roster for the 2016 Super Rugby season for the first time. Immelman's Super Rugby debut match was between the Sunwolves and Cheetahs, in the Singapore National Stadium, which the Cheetahs narrowly won 32-31. It was also the first ever Super Rugby match to be played in Singapore. In 2017, he was added to the Pro14 Elite Referees Panel for the 2017–18 Pro14 tournament, he and became the first ever South African referee to officiate in the tournament when he took charge of the Ospreys versus Zebre match in Round One of the competition.
