= Giant Mtyanda =

South African rugby union player

- Full name: Lubabalo Mtyanda
- Born: 19 March 1986 (age 40) Port Elizabeth, South Africa
- Height: 1.99 m (6 ft 6 1/2 in)
- Weight: 148 kg (326 lb; 23 st 4 lb)
- School: Cowan High School
- University: University of Johannesburg

Rugby union career
- Position: Lock
- Current team: Colorno
Youth career
- 2005–2006: Mighty Elephants
- 2006–2007: Golden Lions
Amateur team(s)
Years	Team	Apps	(Points)
2008	UJ	1	(0)
Senior career
Years	Team	Apps	(Points)
2006	Mighty Elephants	13	(0)
2007	Golden Lions	4	(0)
2010–2013	SWD Eagles	70	(40)
2013–2015	Pumas	47	(20)
2015–2016	Sharks	13	(0)
2017–2019	Eastern Province Elephants	23	(0)
2017–2019	Southern Kings	16	(5)
2019–2021	Rovigo Delta	19	(20)
2021	Mazamet	6	(0)
2021	Eastern Province Elephants	1	(0)
2021–2022	Colorno	7	(0)
- Correct as of 27 March 2022
International career
Years	Team	Apps	(Points)
2013	[[South Africa President's XV]]	3	(0)
- Correct as of 22 April 2018

Lubabalo 'Giant' Mtyanda (born 19 March 1986) is a South African rugby union player for the Colorno in Italian Top10. His regular position is lock.

== Career ==
Mtyanda started his career coming through the youth ranks at the Mighty Elephants (now Eastern Province Kings) and made his debut for them in the 2006 Vodacom Cup competition against Western Province.

He joined the Golden Lions later in the same year, where he represented their Under–21 team. He made four appearances for them in the 2007 Vodacom Cup and also represented UJ in the 2008 Varsity Cup, but failed to break into the first team.

He joined the SWD Eagles at the start of 2009, where he quickly established himself as a regular, making over 50 appearances for the George-based union.

In 2013, he joined the Pumas prior to the 2013 Currie Cup First Division season. He was also included in a South Africa President's XV team that played in the 2013 IRB Tbilisi Cup and won the tournament after winning all three matches.

He was played for the Southern Kings in the 2017 Super Rugby season and until 2019. From 2019 to 20221 he played also in italy with Rovigo Delta and Rugby Colorno.
