= 2017–18 Southern Kings season =

Southern Kings
- 2017–18 season
- Head coach: Deon Davids
- Captains: Mike Willemse, Schalk Ferreira and Jacques Nel
- Stadium: Nelson Mandela Bay Stadium
- Conference B: 7th
- Record: Won 1, Lost 20
- Top try scorer: All: Yaw Penxe (5)
- Top points scorer: All: Masixole Banda (40)
| Home colours | Away colours |

In the 2017–18 rugby union season, the Southern Kings participated in the Pro14 competition, their inaugural appearance in the competition after losing their Super Rugby status after the 2017 season. They finished bottom of the seven-team Conference B, winning just one of their 21 matches. Masixole Banda was the team's top scorer in the competition with 40 points, while winger Yaw Penxe was the top try scorer with five tries.

== Personnel ==
=== Coaches and management ===
The Kings coaching and management staff for the 2017–18 Pro14 season were:

2017–18 Kings coaches and management
| Position | Name |
|---|---|
| Head coach | Deon Davids |
| Forwards coach | Barend Pieterse |
| Backs coach | Chumani Booi |
| Kicking coach | Henning van der Merwe |

=== Squad ===
The Kings' squad for the 2017–18 Pro14 is:

2017–18 Kings squad
| Player | Position/s | Date of birth (age) | Pro12 | | Kings | |
| Player | Position/s | Date of birth (age) | Apps | Pts | Apps | Pts |
|---|---|---|---|---|---|---|
| (South Africa) Lusanda Badiyana | Flank | 1 September 1996 (aged 21) | – | – | – | – |
| (South Africa) Tango Balekile | Hooker | 7 March 1996 (aged 21) | – | – | – | – |
| (South Africa) Masixole Banda | Fullback / Fly-half | 11 June 1988 (aged 29) | – | – | – | – |
| (South Africa) Alshaun Bock | Wing | 16 May 1982 (aged 34) | – | – | – | – |
| (South Africa) Eital Bredenkamp | Flank | 28 January 1993 (aged 24) | – | – | – | – |
| (South Africa) Tienie Burger | Flank | 1 November 1993 (aged 23) | – | – | – | – |
| (South Africa) Stephan Coetzee | Hooker | 9 January 1992 (aged 25) | – | – | – | – |
| (South Africa) Kurt Coleman | Fly-half | 29 January 1990 (aged 27) | – | – | – | – |
| (South Africa) Rossouw de Klerk | Prop | 21 August 1989 (aged 28) | 14 | 5 | – | – |
| (South Africa) Bobby de Wee | Lock | 4 February 1994 (aged 23) | – | – | – | – |
| (South Africa) Pieter-Steyn de Wet | Fly-half | 8 January 1991 (aged 26) | – | – | – | – |
| (South Africa) Martin Dreyer | Prop | 25 August 1988 (aged 29) | – | – | – | – |
| (South Africa) Martin du Toit | Fly-half / Centre | 27 June 1989 (aged 28) | – | – | – | – |
| (South Africa) Ntabeni Dukisa | Utility back | 25 July 1988 (aged 29) | – | – | – | – |
| (South Africa) Schalk Ferreira | Prop | 9 February 1984 (aged 33) | – | – | – | – |
| (South Africa) Justin Forwood | Prop | 19 September 1993 (aged 23) | – | – | – | – |
| (South Africa) Rowan Gouws | Scrum-half | 6 August 1995 (aged 22) | – | – | – | – |
| (South Africa) Stephan Greeff | Lock | 24 December 1989 (aged 27) | – | – | – | – |
| (South Africa) Njabulo Gumede | Prop | 3 January 1995 (aged 22) | – | – | – | – |
| (South Africa) Benhard Janse van Rensburg | Fly-half | 14 January 1997 (aged 20) | – | – | – | – |
| (South Africa) Berton Klaasen | Centre | 24 January 1990 (aged 27) | – | – | – | – |
| (South Africa) Harlon Klaasen | Centre / Wing | 13 August 1993 (aged 24) | – | – | – | – |
| (South Africa) Ruaan Lerm | Number eight | 25 March 1992 (aged 24) | – | – | – | – |
| (South Africa) Khaya Majola | Flank | 13 March 1992 (aged 25) | – | – | – | – |
| (South Africa) Mzamo Majola | Prop | 20 February 1995 (aged 22) | – | – | – | – |
| (South Africa) Michael Makase | Wing | 20 January 1990 (aged 27) | – | – | – | – |
| (South Africa) Godlen Masimla | Scrum-half | 11 August 1992 (aged 25) | – | – | – | – |
| (South Africa) Siya Mdaka | Flank | 14 February 1988 (aged 29) | – | – | – | – |
| (South Africa) Giant Mtyanda | Lock | 19 March 1986 (aged 31) | – | – | – | – |
| (South Africa) Jacques Nel | Centre | 17 March 1993 (aged 24) | – | – | – | – |
| (South Africa) Freddy Ngoza | Flank | 20 October 1991 (aged 25) | – | – | – | – |
| (South Africa) Andisa Ntsila | Loose forward | 7 November 1993 (aged 23) | – | – | – | – |
| (South Africa) Yaw Penxe | Outside back | 3 April 1997 (aged 20) | – | – | – | – |
| (South Africa) Luvuyo Pupuma | Prop | 16 October 1992 (aged 24) | – | – | – | – |
| (South Africa) JC Roos | Fly-half | 12 September 1990 (aged 26) | – | – | – | – |
| (South Africa) Jarryd Sage | Centre | 18 August 1995 (aged 22) | – | – | – | – |
| (South Africa) Pieter Scholtz | Prop | 20 March 1994 (aged 22) | – | – | – | – |
| (South Africa) Victor Sekekete | Flank | 28 January 1994 (aged 23) | – | – | – | – |
| (South Africa) S'bura Sithole | Wing | 14 June 1990 (aged 27) | – | – | – | – |
| (South Africa) Joe Smith | Prop | 2 December 1991 (aged 25) | – | – | – | – |
| (South Africa) JP Smith | Scrum-half | 30 March 1994 (aged 23) | – | – | – | – |
| (South Africa) Piet-Louw Strauss | Prop | 15 March 1994 (aged 23) | – | – | – | – |
| (South Africa) Entienne Swanepoel | Prop | 9 March 1993 (aged 24) | – | – | – | – |
| (South Africa) Dayan van der Westhuizen | Prop | 5 April 1994 (aged 23) | – | – | – | – |
| (South Africa) Alandré van Rooyen | Hooker | 23 August 1996 (aged 21) | – | – | – | – |
| (South Africa) Rudi van Rooyen | Scrum-half | 5 January 1992 (aged 25) | – | – | – | – |
| (Italy) Dries van Schalkwyk | Lock / Number eight | 21 December 1984 (aged 32) | 76 | 100 | – | – |
| (South Africa) Jurie van Vuuren | Lock / Flank | 7 June 1993 (aged 24) | – | – | – | – |
| (South Africa) CJ Velleman | Flank | 24 February 1995 (aged 22) | – | – | – | – |
| (South Africa) Anthony Volmink | Wing | 10 February 1990 (aged 27) | – | – | – | – |
| (South Africa) Luzuko Vulindlu | Centre | 14 November 1987 (aged 29) | – | – | – | – |
| (South Africa) Lindokuhle Welemu | Lock | 29 April 1991 (aged 26) | – | – | – | – |
| (South Africa) Mike Willemse | Hooker | 14 February 1993 (aged 24) | – | – | – | – |
| (South Africa) Oliver Zono | Fly-half | 26 November 1991 (aged 25) | – | – | – | – |
Note: Players' ages and statistics are correct as of 2 September 2017, the date of the opening round of the competition. Pro14 appearances only.

=== Player movements ===
Player movements between the end of the 2017 Super Rugby season and the end of the 2017–18 Pro14 season are as follows:

Southern Kings transfers 2017–2018
| Pos | 2017 squad | Out | In | 2017–18 squad |
|---|---|---|---|---|
| PR | Schalk Ferreira; Justin Forwood; Ross Geldenhuys; Chris Heiberg; Mzamo Majola; Schalk van der Merwe; Dayan van der Westhuizen | (substituted off) Ross Geldenhuys (to Sharks); (substituted off) Chris Heiberg (released); (substituted off) Schalk van der Merwe (to (Ireland) Ulster) | (substituted on) Rossouw de Klerk (from (France) Colomiers); (substituted on) Martin Dreyer (from Bulls); (substituted on) Njabulo Gumede (from Blue Bulls); (substituted on) Luvuyo Pupuma (from Golden Lions); (substituted on) Pieter Scholtz (from Pumas); (substituted on) Joe Smith (from Leopards); (substituted on) Piet-Louw Strauss (from Western Province); (substituted on) Entienne Swanepoel (from (France) Stade Français) | Rossouw de Klerk; Martin Dreyer; Schalk Ferreira; Justin Forwood; Njabulo Gumede; Mzamo Majola; Luvuyo Pupuma; Pieter Scholtz; Joe Smith; Piet-Louw Strauss; Entienne Swanepoel; Dayan van der Westhuizen |
| HK | Tango Balekile (did not play); Martin Bezuidenhout; Kurt Haupt; Mike Willemse | (substituted off) Martin Bezuidenhout (to (France) Bourgoin-Jallieu); (substituted off) Kurt Haupt (returned to SWD Eagles) | (substituted on) Stephan Coetzee (from Sharks); (substituted on) Alandré van Rooyen (from Blue Bulls) | Tango Balekile; Stephan Coetzee; Alandré van Rooyen; Mike Willemse |
| LK | Irné Herbst; Cameron Lindsay (did not play); Sintu Manjezi (did not play); Giant Mtyanda; Wandile Putuma (did not play); Wilhelm van der Sluys; Mzwanele Zito | (substituted off) Irné Herbst (returned to Bulls); (substituted off) Cameron Lindsay (to Pumas); (substituted off) Sintu Manjezi (to Griquas); (substituted off) Wandile Putuma (returned to Griquas); (substituted off) Wilhelm van der Sluys (to (England) Exeter Chiefs); (substituted off) Mzwanele Zito (returned to Griquas) | (substituted on) Bobby de Wee (from Golden Lions); (substituted on) Stephan Greeff (from Pumas); (substituted on) Freddy Ngoza (from Blue Bulls); (substituted on) Dries van Schalkwyk (from (Italy) Zebre); (substituted on) Jurie van Vuuren (from Western Province); (substituted on) Lindokuhle Welemu (from Border Bulldogs) | Bobby de Wee; Stephan Greeff; Giant Mtyanda; Freddy Ngoza; Dries van Schalkwyk; Jurie van Vuuren; Lindokuhle Welemu |
| FL | Thembelani Bholi; Chris Cloete; Andisa Ntsila; Tyler Paul; CJ Velleman (did not play); Stefan Willemse | (substituted off) Thembelani Bholi (to Pumas); (substituted off) Chris Cloete (returned to Pumas); (substituted off) Tyler Paul (to Sharks); (substituted off) Stefan Willemse (to Pumas) | (substituted on) Eital Bredenkamp (from Western Province); (substituted on) Tienie Burger (from Free State Cheetahs); (substituted on) Khaya Majola (from Sharks); (substituted on) Siya Mdaka (from Border Bulldogs); (substituted on) Victor Sekekete (from Golden Lions) | Eital Bredenkamp; Tienie Burger; Khaya Majola; Siya Mdaka; Andisa Ntsila; Victor Sekekete; CJ Velleman |
| N8 | Christiaan de Bruin (did not play); Ruaan Lerm | (substituted off) Christiaan de Bruin (released) | (substituted on) Lusanda Badiyana (from Eastern Province Kings) | Lusanda Badiyana; Ruaan Lerm |
| SH | Louis Schreuder; Ricky Schroeder; Johan Steyn; Stefan Ungerer; Rudi van Rooyen | (substituted off) Louis Schreuder (to Sharks); (substituted off) Ricky Schroeder (released); (substituted off) Johan Steyn (returned to SWD Eagles); (substituted off) Stefan Ungerer (to Pumas) | (substituted on) Rowan Gouws (from Sharks); (substituted on) Godlen Masimla (from Stormers); (substituted on) JP Smith (from Cheetahs) | Rowan Gouws; Godlen Masimla; JP Smith; Rudi van Rooyen |
| FH | Lionel Cronjé; Pieter-Steyn de Wet; Garrick Mattheus (did not play) | (substituted off) Lionel Cronjé (to (Japan) Toyota Verblitz); (substituted off) Garrick Mattheus (released) | (substituted on) Kurt Coleman (from Stormers); (substituted on) Martin du Toit (from SWD Eagles); (substituted on) Benhard Janse van Rensburg (from Sharks); (substituted on) JC Roos (from (Japan) Canon Eagles); (substituted on) Oliver Zono (from Border Bulldogs) | Kurt Coleman; Pieter-Steyn de Wet; Martin du Toit; Benhard Janse van Rensburg; JC Roos; Oliver Zono |
| CE | Siyanda Grey (did not play); Stokkies Hanekom; Berton Klaasen; Neil Maritz (did not play); Waylon Murray; Luzuko Vulindlu | (substituted off) Siyanda Grey (released); (substituted off) Stokkies Hanekom (returned to Lions); (substituted off) Neil Maritz (to Pumas); (substituted off) Waylon Murray (to (France) Mâcon) | (substituted on) Harlon Klaasen (from Western Province); (substituted on) Jacques Nel (from Lions); (substituted on) Jarryd Sage (from Golden Lions) | Berton Klaasen; Harlon Klaasen; Jacques Nel; Jarryd Sage; Luzuko Vulindlu |
| WG | Alshaun Bock; Malcolm Jaer; Makazole Mapimpi; Wandile Mjekevu; Yaw Penxe | (substituted off) Malcolm Jaer (to Cheetahs); (substituted off) Makazole Mapimpi (to Cheetahs); (substituted off) Wandile Mjekevu (to (France) Toulouse) | (substituted on) Michael Makase (from Border Bulldogs); (substituted on) S'bura Sithole (from Sharks); (substituted on) Anthony Volmink (from Golden Lions) | Alshaun Bock; Michael Makase; Yaw Penxe; S'bura Sithole; Anthony Volmink |
| FB | Masixole Banda; Chrysander Botha; Ntabeni Dukisa; Johann Tromp | (substituted off) Chrysander Botha (released); (substituted off) Johann Tromp (released) | | Masixole Banda; Ntabeni Dukisa |
| Coach | Deon Davids | | | Deon Davids |

== Standings ==
The final Conference B log standings are:

2017–18 Pro14 Conference B
| Pos | Team | P | W | D | L | PF | PA | PD | TF | TA | TB | LB | Pts |
|---|---|---|---|---|---|---|---|---|---|---|---|---|---|
| 1 | (Ireland) Leinster | 21 | 14 | 1 | 6 | 601 | 374 | +227 | 83 | 46 | 10 | 2 | 70 |
| 2 | (Wales) Scarlets | 21 | 14 | 1 | 6 | 528 | 365 | +163 | 69 | 43 | 9 | 3 | 70 |
| 3 | (Scotland) Edinburgh | 21 | 15 | 0 | 6 | 494 | 375 | +119 | 62 | 44 | 7 | 1 | 68 |
| 4 | (Ireland) Ulster | 21 | 12 | 2 | 7 | 538 | 482 | +56 | 68 | 61 | 8 | 2 | 62 |
| 5 | (Italy) Benetton | 21 | 11 | 0 | 10 | 415 | 451 | −36 | 51 | 55 | 6 | 5 | 55 |
| 6 | (Wales) Dragons | 21 | 2 | 2 | 17 | 378 | 672 | −294 | 43 | 94 | 4 | 4 | 20 |
| 7 | (South Africa) Southern Kings | 21 | 1 | 0 | 20 | 378 | 829 | −451 | 48 | 119 | 4 | 3 | 11 |

Legend and competition rules
Legend:
| Conference leaders, qualified to play-off semifinals. | P = Games played, W = Games won, D = Games drawn, L = Games lost, PF = Points for, PA = Points against, PD = Points difference, TF = Tries for, TA = Tries against, TB = Try bonus points, LB = Losing bonus points, Pts = Log points |
| Second and third placed teams, qualified to play-off quarterfinals. | P = Games played, W = Games won, D = Games drawn, L = Games lost, PF = Points for, PA = Points against, PD = Points difference, TF = Tries for, TA = Tries against, TB = Try bonus points, LB = Losing bonus points, Pts = Log points |
Competition rules:
Qualification: The top team in each conference qualified for the play-off semifinals, while the second and third placed teams qualified for the play-off quarterfinals. In the quarterfinals, the second-ranked team from each conference had home advantage against the third-ranked team from the other conference, with the winners progressing to the semi-finals. The conference winners had home advantage against the quarterfinal winners in the semifinals, with the two winners qualifying for the final, which was played at a venue decided in advance. Points breakdown: * 4 points for a win * 2 points for a draw * 1 bonus point for a loss by seven points or less * 1 bonus point for scoring four or more tries in a match Classification: Teams standings were calculated as follows: * League points * Number of games won * Overall points difference * Number of tries scored * Number of points scored * Overall try difference * Player suspension count * Player yellow card count * Toss of a coin

=== Round-by-round ===
The table below shows the Kings' progression throughout the season. For each round, their cumulative points total is shown with the conference position:

| Team | R1 | R2 | R3 | R4 | R5 | R6 | R7 | R8 | R9 | R10 | R11 | R12 | R13 | R14 | R15 | R16 | R17 | R18 | R19 | R20 | R21 | QF | SF | Final |
|---|---|---|---|---|---|---|---|---|---|---|---|---|---|---|---|---|---|---|---|---|---|---|---|---|
| Opposition | SCA | CON | LEI | ZEB | DRA | BEN | GLA | ULS | SCA | EDI | EDI | CHE | CHE | ULS | OSP | LEI | DRA | BEN | MUN | CAR | CHE | —N/a | —N/a | —N/a |
| Cumulative Points | 0 | 0 | 0 | 0 | 0 | 0 | 0 | 2 | 4 | 4 | 4 | 4 | 4 | 4 | 4 | 4 | 9 | 11 | 11 | 11 | 11 | —N/a | —N/a | —N/a |
| Position | 7th | 7th | 7th | 7th | 7th | 7th | 7th | 7th | 7th | 7th | 7th | 7th | 7th | 7th | 7th | 7th | 7th | 7th | 7th | 7th | 7th | —N/a | —N/a | —N/a |
| Key: | win | draw | loss | bye | | | | | | | | | | | | | | | | | | | | |

== Matches ==
The Southern Kings' matches in their inaugural season in Pro14 are:

| 2 September 2017 | Scarlets (Wales) | 57–10 | Southern Kings | Parc y Scarlets, Llanelli |
| 17:30 | Try: Johnny McNicholl 8', 73'; Leigh Halfpenny 22'; Rhys Patchell 46'; Jake Ball 50'; Emyr Phillips 62'; Hadleigh Parkes 69'; Steff Evans 77'; Con: Leigh Halfpenny 23', 47', 51'; Rhys Patchell 63', 69', 74', 78'; Pen: Leigh Halfpenny 36' | Report | Try: Yaw Penxe 11'; Con: Kurt Coleman 12'; Pen: Kurt Coleman 34' | Attendance: 9,108; Referee: Frank Murphy |

| 9 September 2017 | Connacht (Ireland) | 32–10 | Southern Kings | Galway Sportsgrounds, Galway |
| 19:35 | Try: Tom Farrell 14'; Eoghan Masterson 33'; Ultan Dillane 40'; Darragh Leader 69'; Con: Jack Carty 15', 34', 40'; Pen: Jack Carty 26', 47'; Cards: Finlay Bealham (yellow card) 52' to 62'; John Muldoon (yellow card) 75' | Report | Try: Berton Klaasen 31'; Luvuyo Pupuma 77'; Cards: S'bura Sithole (yellow card) 11' to 21' | Attendance: 5,104; Referee: Mike Adamson |

| 16 September 2017 | Southern Kings | 10–31 | (Ireland) Leinster | Nelson Mandela Bay Stadium, Port Elizabeth |
| 14:15 | Try: Jacques Nel 75'; Con: Ntabeni Dukisa 76'; Pen: Masixole Banda 3' | Report | Try: Noel Reid 8'; Rory O'Loughlin 42'; Jack Conan 47'; Joey Carbery 51'; Dave Kearney 71'; Con: Ross Byrne 9', 48', 53' | Attendance: 3,011; Referee: Ben Whitehouse |

| 23 September 2017 | Southern Kings | 17–43 | (Italy) Zebre | Nelson Mandela Bay Stadium, Port Elizabeth |
| 19:35 | Try: Godlen Masimla 50'; Luvuyo Pupuma 56'; Con: Pieter-Steyn de Wet 52', 57'; Pen: Pieter-Steyn de Wet 9' | Report | Try: Tommaso Castello 3'; Mattia Bellini 4'; Renato Giammarioli 20'; Tommaso Boni 47'; Giulio Bisegni 66'; Jacopo Sarto 78'; Con: Carlo Canna 3', 22', 48', 67'; Serafin Bordoli 79'; Pen: Carlo Canna 27' | Attendance: 4,062; Referee: Sean Gallagher |

| 30 September 2017 | Dragons (Wales) | 29–13 | Southern Kings | Rodney Parade, Newport |
| 19:35 | Try: Hallam Amos 5', 36'; Elliot Dee 32', 41'; Con: Gavin Henson 6', 38', 43'; Pen: Gavin Henson 15'; Cards: Leon Brown (yellow card) 68' to 78'; Tom Davies (yellow card) 75' | Report | Try: Andisa Ntsila 56'; Con: Pieter-Steyn de Wet 57'; Pen: Pieter-Steyn de Wet 3', 20'; Cards: Entienne Swanepoel (yellow card) 75' | Attendance: 5,299; Referee: Andrew Brace |

| 7 October 2017 | Benetton (Italy) | 31–3 | Southern Kings | Stadio Comunale di Monigo, Treviso |
| 20:00 | Try: Angelo Esposito 31'; Marco Barbini 45', 74'; Cherif Traorè 80'; Con: Ian McKinley 80'; Pen: Marty Banks 9', 21', 24' | Report | Pen: Pieter-Steyn de Wet 38'; Cards: Bobby de Wee (yellow card) 27' to 37' | Attendance: 4,700; Referee: Sean Gallagher |

| 27 October 2017 | Glasgow Warriors (Scotland) | 43–13 | Southern Kings | Scotstoun Stadium, Glasgow |
| 19:35 | Try: Stuart Hogg 0'; Nikola Matawalu 31'; Nick Grigg 34'; Zander Fagerson 58'; Matt Smith 65'; George Horne 71'; George Turner 80'; Con: Adam Hastings 32', 34'; Ruaridh Jackson 72', 80' | Report | Try: Jacques Nel 75'; Con: Oliver Zono 75'; Pen: Masixole Banda 12', 21'; Cards: Jacques Nel (yellow card) 79' | Attendance: 7,351; Referee: Mike Adamson |

| 4 November 2017 | Southern Kings | 36–43 | (Ireland) Ulster | Wolfson Stadium, KwaZakele |
| 17:00 | Try: Berton Klaasen 3', 62'; Yaw Penxe 6', 73'; Michael Makase 28'; Con: Oliver Zono 7', 29', 63'; Kurt Coleman 74'; Pen: Oliver Zono 23'; Cards: Yaw Penxe (yellow card) 33' to 43' | Report | Try: Sean Reidy 18'; John Andrew 26', 49'; John Cooney 53'; Andrew Trimble 68'; Clive Ross 72'; Robbie Diack 75'; Con: John Cooney 54'; Christian Lealiifano 69', 72', 76' | Attendance: 2,836; Referee: Quinton Immelman |

| 26 November 2017 | Southern Kings | 30–34 | (Wales) Scarlets | Nelson Mandela Bay Stadium, Port Elizabeth |
| 15:00 | Try: Michael Makase 9'; Yaw Penxe 16'; Martin du Toit 41'; Harlon Klaasen 65'; Con: Oliver Zono 42'; Kurt Coleman 66'; Pen: Oliver Zono 25', 40' | Report | Try: Tadhg Beirne 4'; Ioan Nicholas 50'; Werner Kruger 56'; Dan Jones 69'; Con: Dan Jones 5', 52', 57', 70'; Pen: Dan Jones 34', 61' | Attendance: 3,619; Referee: Stuart Berry |

| 1 December 2017 | Southern Kings | 21–48 | (Scotland) Edinburgh | Nelson Mandela Bay Stadium, Port Elizabeth |
| 19:15 | Try: Harlon Klaasen 21'; Dries van Schalkwyk 80'; Con: Kurt Coleman 23'; Pen: Kurt Coleman 12', 29', 38'; Cards: Schalk Ferreira (yellow card) 9' to 19'; Yaw Penxe (yellow card) 67' to 77' | Report | Try: Fraser McKenzie 3'; Viliame Mata 5'; Grant Gilchrist 18'; Dougie Fife 59'; Sam Hidalgo-Clyne 70', 72', 77'; Con: Jaco van der Walt 4', 19'; Sam Hidalgo-Clyne 70', 73', 77'; Pen: Jaco van der Walt 10'; Cards: Cornell du Preez (yellow card) 78' | Attendance: 3,600; Referee: Stuart Berry |

| 5 January 2018 | Edinburgh (Scotland) | 37–7 | Southern Kings | Myreside Stadium, Edinburgh |
| 19:35 | Try: Grant Gilchrist 27'; Blair Kinghorn 30'; Duhan van der Merwe 57'; Cameron Fenton 70'; Dougie Fife 78'; Con: Jaco van der Walt 31', 58', 70'; Pen: Jaco van der Walt 21', 49' | Report | Try: Ntabeni Dukisa 73'; Con: Ntabeni Dukisa 75' | Attendance: 3,300; Referee: Lloyd Linton |

| 13 January 2018 | Southern Kings | 21–45 | Cheetahs | Nelson Mandela Bay Stadium, Port Elizabeth |
| 17:00 | Try: Yaw Penxe 7'; Eital Bredenkamp 52' penalty try 70'; Con: Oliver Zono 9', 53' | Report | Try: Clayton Blommetjies 5'; Nico Lee 19', 42', 73'; Shaun Venter 31'; Jacques du Toit 76'; Con: Fred Zeilinga 6', 20', 32', 43', 74', 77'; Pen: Fred Zeilinga 13'; Cards: Justin Basson (yellow card) 52' to 62'; Charles Marais (yellow card) 69' to 79'; Junior Pokomela (yellow card) 70' to 80' | Attendance: 6,711; Referee: Stuart Berry |

| 20 January 2018 | Cheetahs | 45–24 | Southern Kings | Toyota Stadium, Bloemfontein |
| 17:00 | Try: Nico Lee 19', 34'; Uzair Cassiem 25'; Ox Nché 44'; Makazole Mapimpi 48'; Shaun Venter 52'; Con: Fred Zeilinga 21', 26', 34', 45', 49', 53'; Pen: Fred Zeilinga 3'; Cards: Craig Barry (yellow card) 46' to 56' | Report | Try: Luzuko Vulindlu 10'; Schalk Ferreira 31'; Tienie Burger 72'; Con: Ntabeni Dukisa 11', 32'; Benhard Janse van Rensburg 72'; Pen: Ntabeni Dukisa 36' | Attendance: 5,522; Referee: Quinton Immelman |

| 9 February 2018 | Ulster (Ireland) | 59–10 | Southern Kings | Kingspan Stadium, Belfast |
| 19:35 | Try: Craig Gilroy 6', 38', 54'; Stuart McCloskey 17'; Johnny McPhillips 42'; Rob Lyttle 49', 58'; Kieran Treadwell 73'; Darren Cave 76'; Con: John Cooney 7', 18', 39', 43', 50', 74', 77' | Report | Try: Harlon Klaasen 70'; Con: Benhard Janse van Rensburg 70'; Pen: Masixole Banda 15' | Attendance: 13,759; Referee: Joy Neville |

| 16 February 2018 | Ospreys (Wales) | 26–12 | Southern Kings | Liberty Stadium, Swansea |
| 19:35 | Try: Tom Habberfield 12' penalty try 65', 76'; Jeff Hassler 78'; Con: Sam Davies 12' | Report | Try: Michael Makase 20'; Mike Willemse 31'; Con: Martin du Toit 21'; Cards: Joe Smith (yellow card) 64' to 74'; Eital Bredenkamp (yellow card) 68' to 78' | Attendance: 4,673; Referee: David Wilkinson |

| 23 February 2018 | Leinster (Ireland) | 64–7 | Southern Kings | RDS Arena, Dublin |
| 19:35 | Try: Bryan Byrne 3', 27'; Nick McCarthy 10', 47'; Barry Daly 17', 64'; Dave Kearney 22'; Ciaran Frawley 33'; James Lowe 53'; Jordan Larmour 75'; Con: Ciaran Frawley 4', 11', 22', 28', 34', 48', 75' | Report | Try: Mike Willemse 14'; Con: Martin du Toit 15'; Cards: Pieter Scholtz (yellow card) 53' to 63' | Attendance: 10,215; Referee: Dan Jones |

| 2 March 2018 | Southern Kings | 45–13 | (Wales) Dragons | Nelson Mandela Bay Stadium, Port Elizabeth |
| 19:35 | Try: Luzuko Vulindlu 33', 41'; Masixole Banda 39'; Ruaan Lerm 45'; Anthony Volmink 66'; Bobby de Wee 76'; Con: Kurt Coleman 34', 40', 41', 46', 67', 77'; Pen: Kurt Coleman 51' | Report | Try: Dorian Jones 26'; Con: Dorian Jones 26'; Pen: Dorian Jones 5', 38' | Attendance: 4,574; Referee: Quinton Immelman |

| 24 March 2018 | Southern Kings | 35–36 | (Italy) Benetton | Nelson Mandela Bay Stadium, Port Elizabeth |
| 15:00 | Try: Luzuko Vulindlu 9'; Godlen Masimla 17'; Ruaan Lerm 36' penalty try 57'; Berton Klaasen 72'; Con: Kurt Coleman 10', 18'; Masixole Banda 38', 73'; Cards: Tango Balekile (yellow card) 75' | Report | Try: Tomás Baravalle 2'; Marco Lazzaroni 5'; Marty Banks 21'; Tommaso Iannone 28'; Braam Steyn 49'; Con: Marty Banks 6', 22', 29', 50'; Pen: Marty Banks 64'; Cards: Federico Ruzza (yellow card) 57' to 67' | Attendance: 4,913; Referee: Quinton Immelman |

| 7 April 2018 | Southern Kings | 22–39 | (Ireland) Munster | Outeniqua Park, George |
| 19:35 | Try: Andisa Ntsila 26'; Stephan Greeff 30'; Michael Makase 74'; Con: Masixole Banda 28', 75'; Pen: Masixole Banda 35' | Report | Try: Rory Scannell 37'; Calvin Nash 40'; CJ Stander 47'; Dan Goggin 53'; Rhys Marshall 68'; Dave Kilcoyne 71'; Con: Ian Keatley 48', 68', 72'; Pen: Ian Keatley 16'; Cards: Gerbrandt Grobler (yellow card) 24' to 34' | Attendance: 6,318; Referee: Lloyd Linton |

| 14 April 2018 | Southern Kings | 12–45 | (Wales) Cardiff Blues | Nelson Mandela Bay Stadium, Port Elizabeth |
| 18:35 | Try: Ntabeni Dukisa 47'; Lindokuhle Welemu 68'; Con: Masixole Banda 48'; Cards: Schalk Ferreira (yellow card) 36' to 46' | Report | Try: Alex Cuthbert 1'; Seb Davies 6'; Josh Turnbull 24'; Willis Halaholo 31'; Kirby Myhill 37', 54'; Blaine Scully 42'; Con: Jarrod Evans 2', 7', 25', 32', 43' | Attendance: 3,706; Referee: Sean Gallagher |

| 28 April 2018 | Southern Kings | 20–29 | Cheetahs | Nelson Mandela Bay Stadium, Port Elizabeth |
| 15:00 | Try: Ntabeni Dukisa 4'; Harlon Klaasen 42'; Con: Masixole Banda 5', 43'; Pen: Masixole Banda 14', 22' | Report | Try: Paul Schoeman 18'; Niel Marais 28'; Uzair Cassiem 39'; Francois Venter 52'; Con: Niel Marais 19', 40', 53'; Pen: Niel Marais 2' | Attendance: 4,179; Referee: Cwengile Jadezweni |

== Player statistics ==
The Pro14 appearance record for players that represented the Kings in 2017–18 is as follows:

2017–18 Kings player statistics
| Player name | SCA | CON | LEI | ZEB | DRA | BEN | GLA | ULS | SCA | EDI | EDI | CHE | CHE | ULS | OSP | LEI | DRA | BEN | MUN | CAR | CHE | App | Try | Con | Pen | DG | Pts |
|---|---|---|---|---|---|---|---|---|---|---|---|---|---|---|---|---|---|---|---|---|---|---|---|---|---|---|---|
| Schalk Ferreira | 1 | 1 | 1 | 1 | 1 | 1 | 1 | 1 | 1 | 1 | 1 | 1 | 1 | 1 | 1 | 1 | 1 | 1 | 1 | 1 | | 20 | 1 | 0 | 0 | 0 | 5 |
| Mike Willemse (c) | 2 | 2 | 2 | 2 | 2 | 2 | 2 | | | | | 16 (substituted on) | 2 | 2 | 2 | 2 | 2 | | | | | 13 | 2 | 0 | 0 | 0 | 10 |
| Rossouw de Klerk | 3 | 3 | | 17 (substituted on) | 17 (substituted on) | 17 (substituted on) | 3 | 3 | 3 | 3 | 18 (substituted on) | | | | | | | | | 3 | 3 | 12 | 0 | 0 | 0 | 0 | 0 |
| Jurie van Vuuren | 4 | 4 | | | 7 | 7 | 7 | 7 | 19 (substituted on) | | 4 | | | 19 (substituted on) | 19 (substituted on) | | | | | | | 10 | 0 | 0 | 0 | 0 | 0 |
| Dries van Schalkwyk | 5 | 5 | 5 | 5 | 8 | 8 | | 20 (substituted on) | 20 (substituted on) | 20 (substituted on) | 5 | | | | | | 20 (substituted on) | | | | 8 | 12 | 1 | 0 | 0 | 0 | 5 |
| Khaya Majola | 6 | 6 | 6 | 6 | 20 (substituted on) | 20 (substituted on) | 20 (substituted on) | | | | | | | | | | | | | 20 (substituted on) | 6 | 9 | 0 | 0 | 0 | 0 | 0 |
| Victor Sekekete | 7 | 7 | 7 | 7 | | | | | | | | | | | | | | | | | | 4 | 0 | 0 | 0 | 0 | 0 |
| Andisa Ntsila | 8 | 8 | 8 | 8 | 6 | 6 | 6 | 6 | 6 | 6 | | | 6 | 6 | 6 | 8 | 6 | 6 | 6 | | | 17 | 2 | 0 | 0 | 0 | 10 |
| Rudi van Rooyen | 9 | 21 (substituted on) | 9 | 9 | | 21 (substituted on) | 9 | 9 | 9 | 9 | 9 | 21 (substituted on) | 21 (substituted on) | | | | | | 21 (substituted on) | 21 (substituted on) | | 14 | 0 | 0 | 0 | 0 | 0 |
| Kurt Coleman | 10 | 10 | | | | | | 22 (substituted on) | 23 (substituted on) | 10 | 10 | | | | | | 22 (substituted on) | 10 | | | | 8 | 0 | 12 | 5 | 0 | 39 |
| S'bura Sithole | 11 | 11 | 11 | 11 | | 14 | | | | | | | | | | | | | | | | 5 | 0 | 0 | 0 | 0 | 0 |
| Luzuko Vulindlu | 12 | 12 | 12 | 12 | 23 (substituted on) | 12 | 12 | 12 | | | | | 12 | 12 | 12 | 12 | 12 | 12 | 22 (substituted on) | 12 | | 16 | 4 | 0 | 0 | 0 | 20 |
| Berton Klaasen | 13 | 13 | 13 | 13 | 12 | 23 (substituted on) | 13 | 13 | 13 | 12 | 13 | 13 | 23 (substituted on) | 13 | 13 | 13 | 13 | 13 | 12 | 13 | | 20 | 4 | 0 | 0 | 0 | 20 |
| Yaw Penxe | 14 | 14 | 14 | 14 | 14 | | 14 | 15 | 15 | 15 | 14 | 15 | 11 | 14 | 14 | 15 | | | 11 | 11 | 15 | 18 | 5 | 0 | 0 | 0 | 25 |
| Masixole Banda | 15 | 15 | 15 | 15 | 15 | 15 | 15 | | | | 23 (substituted on) | | | 15 | 15 | | 15 | 15 | 15 | 15 | 10 | 15 | 1 | 7 | 7 | 0 | 40 |
| Stephan Coetzee | 16 (substituted on) | 16 (substituted on) | 16 (substituted on) | 16 (substituted on) | 16 (substituted on) | | | 2 | 2 | 2 | 2 | 2 | | 16 (substituted on) | 16 (substituted on) | 16 (substituted on) | 16 (substituted on) | 2 | 2 | 2 | 2 | 18 | 0 | 0 | 0 | 0 | 0 |
| Luvuyo Pupuma | 17 (substituted on) | 17 (substituted on) | 3 | 3 | | | | 18 (substituted on) | 17 (substituted on) | 17 (substituted on) | | | | | 18 (substituted on) | 18 (substituted on) | 18 (substituted on) | 18 (substituted on) | 18 (substituted on) | 18 (substituted on) | 18 (substituted on) | 14 | 2 | 0 | 0 | 0 | 10 |
| Entienne Swanepoel | 18 (substituted on) | 18 (substituted on) | | | 18 (substituted on) | 18 (substituted on) | | | | | | | | | | | | | | | | 4 | 0 | 0 | 0 | 0 | 0 |
| Bobby de Wee | 19 (substituted on) | 19 (substituted on) | 19 (substituted on) | 19 (substituted on) | 5 | 5 | 5 | 5 | 5 | 5 | | 5 | 5 | 5 | 5 | 5 | 5 | 5 | 5 | 4 | 5 | 20 | 1 | 0 | 0 | 0 | 5 |
| Siya Mdaka | 20 (substituted on) | 20 (substituted on) | 20 (substituted on) | | | | | | | | | | | | | | | | | | | 3 | 0 | 0 | 0 | 0 | 0 |
| Godlen Masimla | 21 (substituted on) | 9 | 21 (substituted on) | 21 (substituted on) | 9 | 9 | | | 21 (substituted on) | 21 (substituted on) | | | | 21 (substituted on) | 21 (substituted on) | | 21 (substituted on) | 9 | 9 | 9 | 9 | 15 | 2 | 0 | 0 | 0 | 10 |
| Ntabeni Dukisa | 22 (substituted on) | | 22 (substituted on) | | | | | | | | 15 | 22 (substituted on) | 15 | | | | | | 23 (substituted on) | 10 | 12 | 8 | 3 | 4 | 1 | 0 | 26 |
| Jacques Nel | 23 (substituted on) | 23 (substituted on) | 23 (substituted on) | 23 (substituted on) | 13 | 13 | 23 (substituted on) | | | 23 (substituted on) | | | | | | 23 (substituted on) | 23 (substituted on) | 23 (substituted on) | 13 | | 13 | 13 | 2 | 0 | 0 | 0 | 10 |
| Oliver Zono | | 22 (substituted on) | 10 | 22 (substituted on) | 22 (substituted on) | 22 (substituted on) | 22 (substituted on) | 10 | 10 | | | 10 | | | | | | | | | | 9 | 0 | 7 | 3 | 0 | 23 |
| Stephan Greeff | | | 4 | 4 | 4 | 4 | 4 | 4 | 4 | 4 | | 4 | 4 | 4 | 4 | 4 | 4 | 4 | 4 | | 4 | 17 | 1 | 0 | 0 | 0 | 5 |
| Piet-Louw Strauss | | | 17 (substituted on) | | | | | | | | | | | | | | | | | | | 1 | 0 | 0 | 0 | 0 | 0 |
| Martin Dreyer | | | 18 (substituted on) | 18 (substituted on) | 3 | 3 | 18 (substituted on) | | | | 17 (substituted on) | | | | | | | | | | | 6 | 0 | 0 | 0 | 0 | 0 |
| Pieter-Steyn de Wet | | | | 10 | 10 | 10 | | | | | | | | | | | | | | | | 3 | 0 | 3 | 4 | 0 | 18 |
| Freddy Ngoza | | | | 20 (substituted on) | | | | | | | 20 (substituted on) | 20 (substituted on) | | | | | | | | | | 3 | 0 | 0 | 0 | 0 | 0 |
| Alshaun Bock | | | | | 11 | 11 | 11 | 11 | | | 11 | | | | | | | 11 | | 22 (substituted on) | | 7 | 0 | 0 | 0 | 0 | 0 |
| Giant Mtyanda | | | | | 19 (substituted on) | 19 (substituted on) | 19 (substituted on) | | | 19 (substituted on) | | | | | | | | 19 (substituted on) | 19 (substituted on) | 5 | 19 (substituted on) | 8 | 0 | 0 | 0 | 0 | 0 |
| Rowan Gouws | | | | | 21 (substituted on) | | 21 (substituted on) | 21 (substituted on) | | | 21 (substituted on) | 9 | 9 | 9 | 9 | 9 | 9 | 21 (substituted on) | | | | 11 | 0 | 0 | 0 | 0 | 0 |
| Tango Balekile | | | | | | 16 (substituted on) | 16 (substituted on) | 16 (substituted on) | | | 16 (substituted on) | | 16 (substituted on) | | | | | 16 (substituted on) | | 16 (substituted on) | 16 (substituted on) | 8 | 0 | 0 | 0 | 0 | 0 |
| Ruaan Lerm | | | | | | | 8 | 8 | 8 | 8 | 8 | 8 | 8 | 8 | 8 | 20 (substituted on) | 8 | 8 | 8 | 8 | | 14 | 2 | 0 | 0 | 0 | 10 |
| Martin du Toit | | | | | | | 10 | | 12 | | 12 | 12 | 10 | 10 | 10 | 10 | 10 | 22 (substituted on) | 10 | | | 11 | 1 | 2 | 0 | 0 | 9 |
| Mzamo Majola | | | | | | | 17 (substituted on) | 17 (substituted on) | | | | | | | | | | | | | | 2 | 0 | 0 | 0 | 0 | 0 |
| Michael Makase | | | | | | | | 14 | 14 | 14 | | 14 | 14 | | 11 | 14 | 14 | 14 | 14 | 14 | 14 | 12 | 4 | 0 | 0 | 0 | 20 |
| Lindokuhle Welemu | | | | | | | | 19 (substituted on) | | | 19 (substituted on) | 19 (substituted on) | 19 (substituted on) | | | 19 (substituted on) | 19 (substituted on) | | | 19 (substituted on) | 20 (substituted on) | 8 | 1 | 0 | 0 | 0 | 5 |
| Jarryd Sage | | | | | | | | 23 (substituted on) | | | | | | | | | | | | | | 1 | 0 | 0 | 0 | 0 | 0 |
| Tienie Burger | | | | | | | | | 7 | 7 | 7 | 7 | 7 | 7 | 7 | 7 | 7 | 7 | 7 | 7 | 7 | 13 | 1 | 0 | 0 | 0 | 5 |
| Anthony Volmink | | | | | | | | | 11 | 11 | | 11 | | 11 | | 11 | 11 | | | | | 6 | 1 | 0 | 0 | 0 | 5 |
| Alandré van Rooyen | | | | | | | | | 16 (substituted on) | 16 (substituted on) | | | | | | | | | 16 (substituted on) | | | 3 | 0 | 0 | 0 | 0 | 0 |
| Pieter Scholtz | | | | | | | | | 18 (substituted on) | 18 (substituted on) | 3 | 3 | 3 | 3 | 3 | 3 | 3 | 3 | 3 | | | 11 | 0 | 0 | 0 | 0 | 0 |
| Harlon Klaasen | | | | | | | | | 22 (substituted on) | 13 | 22 (substituted on) | 23 (substituted on) | 13 | 23 (substituted on) | 23 (substituted on) | | | | | 23 (substituted on) | 11 | 9 | 4 | 0 | 0 | 0 | 20 |
| Benhard Janse van Rensburg | | | | | | | | | | 22 (substituted on) | | | 22 (substituted on) | 22 (substituted on) | 22 (substituted on) | 22 (substituted on) | | | | | | 5 | 0 | 2 | 0 | 0 | 4 |
| Eital Bredenkamp | | | | | | | | | | | 6 | 6 | 20 (substituted on) | 20 (substituted on) | 20 (substituted on) | 6 | | | | | | 6 | 1 | 0 | 0 | 0 | 5 |
| Joe Smith | | | | | | | | | | | | 17 (substituted on) | 17 (substituted on) | 17 (substituted on) | 17 (substituted on) | 17 | 17 (substituted on) | 17 | | | | 5 | 0 | 0 | 0 | 0 | 0 |
| Dayan van der Westhuizen | | | | | | | | | | | | 18 (substituted on) | 18 (substituted on) | 18 (substituted on) | | | | | | | 17 (substituted on) | 4 | 0 | 0 | 0 | 0 | 0 |
| JP Smith | | | | | | | | | | | | | | | | 21 (substituted on) | | | | | 21 (substituted on) | 2 | 0 | 0 | 0 | 0 | 0 |
| Lusanda Badiyana | | | | | | | | | | | | | | | | | | 20 (substituted on) | 20 (substituted on) | 6 | 22 (substituted on) | 4 | 0 | 0 | 0 | 0 | 0 |
| Justin Forwood | | | | | | | | | | | | | | | | | | | 17 (substituted on) | 17 (substituted on) | 1 | 3 | 0 | 0 | 0 | 0 | 0 |
| JC Roos | | | | | | | | | | | | | | | | | | | | | 23 (substituted on) | 1 | 0 | 0 | 0 | 0 | 0 |
| penalty try | | | | | | | | | | | | | | | | | | | | | | – | 2 | – | – | – | 14 |
| Total | | | | | | | | | | | | | | | | | | | | | | 21 | 48 | 37 | 20 | 0 | 378 |

(c) denotes the team captain. For each match, the player's squad number is shown. Starting players are numbered 1 to 15, while the replacements are numbered 16 to 23. If a replacement made an appearance in the match, it is indicated by (substituted on) . "App" refers to the number of appearances made by the player, "Try" to the number of tries scored by the player, "Con" to the number of conversions kicked, "Pen" to the number of penalties kicked, "DG" to the number of drop goals kicked and "Pts" refer to the total number of points scored by the player.

- Njabulo Gumede and CJ Velleman did not make any appearances.

== Awards ==
The following player were honoured at the Southern Kings' end-of-season awards:

2017–18 Kings player awards winners
| Award | Player |
|---|---|
| Player of the Year | Bobby de Wee |
| Try of the Year | Michael Makase |
| Most Professional Player | Berton Klaasen |
| Player's Player of the Year | Bobby de Wee |
| Golden Boot | Kurt Coleman |
| Most Valuable Player | Schalk Ferreira |
| Most Consistent Performer | Tienie Burger |
| Best Back | Yaw Penxe |
| Best Forward | Andisa Ntsila |

== See also ==
- Southern Kings
- Pro14
