= List of 2017–18 Super Rugby transfers (South Africa) =

This is a list of player movements for Super Rugby teams prior to the end of the 2018 Super Rugby season. Departure and arrivals of all players that were included in a Super Rugby squad for 2017 or 2018 are listed here, regardless of when it occurred. Future-dated transfers are only included if confirmed by the player or his agent, his former team or his new team.

In addition to the main squad, teams can also name additional players that train in backup or development squads for the franchises.

== Notes ==
- 2017 players listed are all players that were named in the initial senior squad, or subsequently included in a 23-man match day squad at any game during the season.
- (did not play) denotes that a player did not play at all during one of the two seasons due to injury or non-selection. These players are included to indicate they were contracted to the team.
- (short-term) denotes that a player wasn't initially contracted, but came in during the season. This could either be a club rugby player coming in as injury cover, or a player whose contract had expired at another team (typically in the northern hemisphere).
- Flags are only shown for players moving to or from another country.
- Players may play in several positions, but are listed in only one.

== Transfers ==
=== Bulls ===
Bulls transfers 2017–2018
Pos	2017 squad	Out	In	2018 squad
PR	Jacobie Adriaanse; Martin Dreyer; Lizo Gqoboka; John-Roy Jenkinson; Trevor Nyakane; Pierre Schoeman; Conraad van Vuuren	(substituted off) Jacobie Adriaanse (to Lions); (substituted off) Martin Dreyer (to Southern Kings); (substituted off) John-Roy Jenkinson (to Blue Bulls)	(substituted in) Matthys Basson (from Blue Bulls); (substituted in) Simphiwe Matanzima (from Blue Bulls XV); (substituted in) Nqoba Mxoli (from Blue Bulls); (substituted in) Mornay Smith (from Blue Bulls XV); (substituted in) Frans van Wyk (from Stormers)	Matthys Basson; Lizo Gqoboka; Simphiwe Matanzima (did not play); Nqoba Mxoli; Trevor Nyakane; Pierre Schoeman; Mornay Smith; Conraad van Vuuren; Frans van Wyk
HK	Corniel Els (did not play); Edgar Marutlulle; Adriaan Strauss; Jaco Visagie	(substituted off) Corniel Els (to Blue Bulls)	(substituted in) Johan Grobbelaar (from Blue Bulls)	Johan Grobbelaar; Edgar Marutlulle; Adriaan Strauss; Jaco Visagie
LK	Lood de Jager; Jason Jenkins; Abongile Nonkontwana; RG Snyman; Ruben van Heerden	(substituted off) Abongile Nonkontwana (to Blue Bulls)	(substituted in) Aston Fortuin (from Blue Bulls); (substituted in) Ruan Nortjé (from Blue Bulls XV)	Lood de Jager; Aston Fortuin (did not play); Jason Jenkins; Ruan Nortjé; RG Snyman; Ruben van Heerden
FL	Shaun Adendorff; Arno Botha; Nick de Jager; Jannes Kirsten; Jacques Potgieter; Marnus Schoeman (Note: Marnus Schoeman was initially included in the Stormers' squad for the 2017 season, on loan from the Pumas. However, in April 2017 – prior to making any appearances in the competition – he ended his loan move and joined the Bulls on loan instead.); Roelof Smit (did not play); Hendré Stassen (did not play); Ruan Steenkamp	(substituted off) Arno Botha (to (England) London Irish); (substituted off) Jacques Potgieter (sabbatical); (substituted off) Marnus Schoeman (to Lions)	(substituted in) Tim Agaba (from South Africa Sevens); (substituted in) Thembelani Bholi (from Southern Kings); (substituted in) Marco van Staden (from Blue Bulls)	Shaun Adendorff; Tim Agaba; Thembelani Bholi; Nick de Jager; Jannes Kirsten; Roelof Smit; Hendré Stassen; Ruan Steenkamp (did not play); Marco van Staden
N8	Renaldo Bothma; Hanro Liebenberg	(substituted off) Renaldo Bothma (to (England) Harlequins)		Hanro Liebenberg
SH	Rudy Paige; Ivan van Zyl; Piet van Zyl; André Warner	(substituted off) Rudy Paige (to Blue Bulls); (substituted off) Piet van Zyl (to (England) London Irish)	(substituted in) Embrose Papier (from Blue Bulls)	Embrose Papier; Ivan van Zyl; André Warner
FH	Tony Jantjies; Handré Pollard; Tian Schoeman	(substituted off) Tony Jantjies (to Blue Bulls); (substituted off) Tian Schoeman (to (France) Bordeaux)	(substituted in) Marnitz Boshoff (from (Ireland) Connacht); (substituted in) Boeta Hamman (from Blue Bulls XV); (substituted in) Manie Libbok (from Blue Bulls)	Marnitz Boshoff; Boeta Hamman; Manie Libbok; Handré Pollard
CE	Ulrich Beyers; Francois Brummer; JT Jackson (did not play); Johnny Kôtze (did not play); Jesse Kriel; Burger Odendaal; Jan Serfontein; Dries Swanepoel	(substituted off) Ulrich Beyers (to Blue Bulls); (substituted off) Jan Serfontein (to (France) Montpellier)		Francois Brummer; JT Jackson; Johnny Kôtze; Jesse Kriel; Burger Odendaal; Dries Swanepoel
WG	Travis Ismaiel; Kefentse Mahlo; Rabz Maxwane; Franco Naudé; Luther Obi (did not play) (Note: Luther Obi was initially included in the Bulls' squad for the 2017 season. However, in March 2017 – prior to making any appearances in the competition – he got an early release from his Bulls contract and joined the Cheetahs.); Jade Stighling; Jamba Ulengo	(substituted off) Kefentse Mahlo (to Naka Bulls); (substituted off) Rabz Maxwane (to Cheetahs); (substituted off) Franco Naudé (to Blue Bulls); (substituted off) Luther Obi (to Cheetahs)	(substituted in) Divan Rossouw (from Blue Bulls)	Travis Ismaiel; Divan Rossouw; Jade Stighling (did not play); Jamba Ulengo
FB	Warrick Gelant; Duncan Matthews			Warrick Gelant; Duncan Matthews
Coach	Nollis Marais	(substituted off) Nollis Marais (to Blue Bulls)	(substituted in) John Mitchell (from United States)	John Mitchell

=== Cheetahs ===
On 7 July 2017, the South African Rugby Union announced that the Cheetahs (along with the Kings) would no longer participate in Super Rugby, following an earlier decision from SANZAAR to reduce the number of South African teams from six teams to four for 2018. All players moved to the Cheetahs Pro14 team unless otherwise indicated.

Cheetahs transfers 2017–2018
Pos	2017 squad	Out	In	2018 players
PR	Tom Botha; Aranos Coetzee; Charles Marais; Danie Mienie; Ox Nché	(substituted off) Danie Mienie (to (France) Toulouse)	—N/a	—N/a
HK	Jacques du Toit (did not play); Joseph Dweba; Elandré Huggett; Torsten van Jaarsveld; Reinach Venter		—N/a	—N/a
LK	Justin Basson; Reniel Hugo; Armandt Koster; Francois Uys; Dennis Visser (did not play); Carl Wegner	(substituted off) Francois Uys (to (France) Grenoble)	—N/a	—N/a
FL	Uzair Cassiem; Chris Dry; Hilton Lobberts (did not play); Oupa Mohojé; Junior Pokomela; Boom Prinsloo; Paul Schoeman; Henco Venter	(substituted off) Boom Prinsloo (to Blue Bulls)	—N/a	—N/a
N8	Niell Jordaan		—N/a	—N/a
SH	Tian Meyer; Zee Mkhabela; Ruan van Rensburg; Shaun Venter		—N/a	—N/a
FH	Ryno Eksteen (did not play); Niel Marais; Clinton Swart; Fred Zeilinga	(substituted off) Clinton Swart (returned to Griquas)	—N/a	—N/a
CE	Nico Lee; Ali Mgijima; William Small-Smith; Michael van der Spuy; Francois Venter	(substituted off) Michael van der Spuy (retired)	—N/a	—N/a
WG	Rayno Benjamin; JW Jonker; Luther Obi; Sergeal Petersen; Raymond Rhule	(substituted off) JW Jonker (to Free State Cheetahs)	—N/a	—N/a
FB	Clayton Blommetjies		—N/a	—N/a
Coach	Franco Smith		—N/a	—N/a

=== Kings ===
On 7 July 2017, the South African Rugby Union announced that the Kings (along with the Cheetahs) would no longer participate in Super Rugby, following an earlier decision from SANZAAR to reduce the number of South African teams from six teams to four for 2018. All players moved to the Kings Pro14 team unless otherwise indicated.

Southern Kings transfers 2017–2018
Pos	2017 squad	Out	In	2018 players
PR	Schalk Ferreira; Justin Forwood; Ross Geldenhuys; Chris Heiberg; Mzamo Majola; Schalk van der Merwe; Dayan van der Westhuizen	(substituted off) Ross Geldenhuys (to Sharks); (substituted off) Chris Heiberg (to (Australia) Force); (substituted off) Schalk van der Merwe (to (Ireland) Ulster)	—N/a	—N/a
HK	Tango Balekile (did not play); Martin Bezuidenhout; Kurt Haupt; Mike Willemse	(substituted off) Martin Bezuidenhout (to (France) Bourgoin); (substituted off) Kurt Haupt (returned to SWD Eagles)	—N/a	—N/a
LK	Irné Herbst; Cameron Lindsay (did not play); Sintu Manjezi (did not play); Giant Mtyanda; Wandile Putuma (did not play); Wilhelm van der Sluys; Mzwanele Zito	(substituted off) Irné Herbst (returned to Bulls); (substituted off) Cameron Lindsay (to Pumas); (substituted off) Sintu Manjezi (to Griquas); (substituted off) Wandile Putuma (returned to Griquas); (substituted off) Wilhelm van der Sluys (to (England) Exeter Chiefs); (substituted off) Mzwanele Zito (returned to Griquas)	—N/a	—N/a
FL	Thembelani Bholi; Chris Cloete; Andisa Ntsila; Tyler Paul; CJ Velleman (did not play); Stefan Willemse	(substituted off) Thembelani Bholi (to Pumas); (substituted off) Chris Cloete (returned to Pumas); (substituted off) Tyler Paul (to Sharks); (substituted off) Stefan Willemse (to Pumas)	—N/a	—N/a
N8	Christiaan de Bruin (did not play); Ruaan Lerm	(substituted off) Christiaan de Bruin (released)	—N/a	—N/a
SH	Louis Schreuder; Ricky Schroeder; Johan Steyn; Stefan Ungerer; Rudi van Rooyen	(substituted off) Louis Schreuder (to Sharks); (substituted off) Ricky Schroeder (retired); (substituted off) Johan Steyn (returned to SWD Eagles); (substituted off) Stefan Ungerer (to Pumas)	—N/a	—N/a
FH	Lionel Cronjé; Pieter-Steyn de Wet; Garrick Mattheus (did not play)	(substituted off) Lionel Cronjé (to (Japan) Toyota Verblitz); (substituted off) Garrick Mattheus (to Blue Bulls U21)	—N/a	—N/a
CE	Siyanda Grey (did not play); Stokkies Hanekom; Berton Klaasen; Neil Maritz (did not play); Waylon Murray; Luzuko Vulindlu	(substituted off) Siyanda Grey (to Eastern Province Kings); (substituted off) Stokkies Hanekom (returned to Lions); (substituted off) Neil Maritz (to Pumas); (substituted off) Waylon Murray (to (France) Mâcon)	—N/a	—N/a
WG	Alshaun Bock; Ntabeni Dukisa; Malcolm Jaer; Makazole Mapimpi; Wandile Mjekevu; Yaw Penxe	(substituted off) Malcolm Jaer (to Cheetahs); (substituted off) Makazole Mapimpi (to Cheetahs); (substituted off) Wandile Mjekevu (to (France) Toulouse)	—N/a	—N/a
FB	Masixole Banda; Chrysander Botha; Johann Tromp	(substituted off) Chrysander Botha (to (Namibia) Welwitschias); (substituted off) Johann Tromp (to (Namibia) Welwitschias)	—N/a	—N/a
Coach	Deon Davids		—N/a	—N/a

=== Lions ===
Lions transfers 2017–2018
Pos	2017 squad	Out	In	2018 squad
PR	Justin Ackerman (did not play); Ruan Dreyer; Corné Fourie; Johannes Jonker; Sti Sithole; Dylan Smith; Jacques van Rooyen; Hencus van Wyk	(substituted off) Justin Ackerman (to (France) Montpellier); (substituted off) Hencus van Wyk (to (Japan) Sunwolves)	(substituted in) Jacobie Adriaanse (from Bulls)	Jacobie Adriaanse; Ruan Dreyer; Corné Fourie; Johannes Jonker; Sti Sithole; Dylan Smith; Jacques van Rooyen
HK	Robbie Coetzee; Malcolm Marx; Akker van der Merwe	(substituted off) Akker van der Merwe (to Sharks)		Robbie Coetzee; Malcolm Marx
LK	Lourens Erasmus; Andries Ferreira; Robert Kruger; Franco Mostert; Marvin Orie		(substituted in) Rhyno Herbst (from Golden Lions)	Lourens Erasmus; Andries Ferreira; Rhyno Herbst (did not play); Robert Kruger; Franco Mostert; Marvin Orie
FL	Ruan Ackermann; Fabian Booysen (did not play); Cyle Brink; Hacjivah Dayimani (did not play); Jaco Kriel; Kwagga Smith	(substituted off) Ruan Ackermann (to (England) Gloucester); (substituted off) Fabian Booysen (to SWD Eagles)	(substituted in) Len Massyn (from Golden Lions); (substituted in) Marnus Schoeman (from Bulls)	Cyle Brink; Hacjivah Dayimani; Jaco Kriel (did not play); Len Massyn; Marnus Schoeman; Kwagga Smith
N8	Warren Whiteley		(substituted in) Willie Engelbrecht (from Pumas)	Willie Engelbrecht (did not play); Warren Whiteley
SH	Ross Cronjé; Faf de Klerk; Dillon Smit	(substituted off) Faf de Klerk (to (England) Sale Sharks)	(substituted in) Nic Groom (from (England) Northampton Saints); (substituted in) Marco Jansen van Vuren (from Golden Lions); (substituted in) Christiaan Meyer (from Griquas)	Ross Cronjé; Nic Groom (short-term); Marco Jansen van Vuren; Christiaan Meyer (did not play); Dillon Smit
FH	Elton Jantjies; Shaun Reynolds		(substituted in) Ashlon Davids (from Golden Lions)	Ashlon Davids; Elton Jantjies; Shaun Reynolds
CE	Rohan Janse van Rensburg; Lionel Mapoe; Howard Mnisi; Jacques Nel; Harold Vorster	(substituted off) Jacques Nel (to Southern Kings)		Rohan Janse van Rensburg; Lionel Mapoe; Howard Mnisi; Harold Vorster
WG	Ruan Combrinck; Courtnall Skosan; Madosh Tambwe; Anthony Volmink	(substituted off) Anthony Volmink (to Southern Kings)	(substituted in) Aphiwe Dyantyi (from Golden Lions)	Ruan Combrinck; Aphiwe Dyantyi; Courtnall Skosan; Madosh Tambwe
FB	Andries Coetzee; Sylvian Mahuza; Jaco van der Walt	(substituted off) Jaco van der Walt (to (Scotland) Edinburgh)		Andries Coetzee; Sylvian Mahuza
Coach	Johan Ackermann	(substituted off) Johan Ackermann (to (England) Gloucester)	(substituted in) Swys de Bruin (from assistant coach)	Swys de Bruin

=== Sharks ===
Sharks transfers 2017–2018
Pos	2017 squad	Out	In	2018 squad
PR	Lourens Adriaanse; Thomas du Toit; John-Hubert Meyer; Tendai Mtawarira; Coenie Oosthuizen; Juan Schoeman	(substituted off) Lourens Adriaanse (to (France) Pau)	(substituted in) Ross Geldenhuys (from Southern Kings); (substituted in) Mzamo Majola (returned from Southern Kings); (substituted in) Khutha Mchunu (from Sharks U21)	Thomas du Toit; Ross Geldenhuys; Mzamo Majola; Khutha Mchunu (did not play); John-Hubert Meyer; Tendai Mtawarira; Coenie Oosthuizen (did not play); Juan Schoeman
HK	Stephan Coetzee; Franco Marais; Chiliboy Ralepelle	(substituted off) Stephan Coetzee (to Southern Kings)	(substituted in) Akker van der Merwe (from Lions); (substituted in) Kerron van Vuuren (from Sharks XV)	Franco Marais; Chiliboy Ralepelle; Akker van der Merwe; Kerron van Vuuren (did not play)
LK	Hyron Andrews; Ruan Botha; Jean Droste; Stephan Lewies; Etienne Oosthuizen	(substituted off) Etienne Oosthuizen (to (France) Lyon)	(substituted in) Gideon Koegelenberg (from (Italy) Zebre)	Hyron Andrews; Ruan Botha; Jean Droste (did not play); Gideon Koegelenberg; Stephan Lewies
FL	Keegan Daniel (did not play); Jean Deysel (did not play); Jean-Luc du Preez; Francois Kleinhans (did not play); Khaya Majola (did not play); Tera Mtembu; Jacques Vermeulen	(substituted off) Jean Deysel (to (Ireland) Ulster); (substituted off) Francois Kleinhans (to Pumas); (substituted off) Khaya Majola (to Southern Kings)	(substituted in) Tyler Paul (from Southern Kings); (substituted in) Wian Vosloo (from Sharks (Currie Cup))	Keegan Daniel; Jean-Luc du Preez; Tera Mtembu; Tyler Paul; Jacques Vermeulen; Wian Vosloo
N8	Dan du Preez; Philip van der Walt			Dan du Preez; Philip van der Walt
SH	Michael Claassens; Rowan Gouws (did not play); Cobus Reinach; Hanco Venter (did not play)	(substituted off) Rowan Gouws (to Southern Kings); (substituted off) Cobus Reinach (to (England) Northampton Saints); (substituted off) Hanco Venter (to UP Tuks)	(substituted in) Louis Schreuder (from Southern Kings); (substituted in) Grant Williams (from Sharks U21); (substituted in) Cameron Wright (from (France) Montpellier)	Michael Claassens (did not play); Louis Schreuder; Grant Williams; Cameron Wright
FH	Garth April; Curwin Bosch; Benhard Janse van Rensburg; Patrick Lambie; Inny Radebe	(substituted off) Benhard Janse van Rensburg (to Southern Kings); (substituted off) Patrick Lambie (to (France) Racing 92); (substituted off) Inny Radebe (to Golden Lions XV)	(substituted in) Robert du Preez (from Stormers)	Garth April; Curwin Bosch; Robert du Preez
CE	Lukhanyo Am; Tristan Blewett (did not play); Johan Deysel; André Esterhuizen; Marius Louw; Jeremy Ward			Lukhanyo Am; Tristan Blewett (did not play); Johan Deysel (did not play); André Esterhuizen; Marius Louw; Jeremy Ward (did not play)
WG	Lwazi Mvovo; Odwa Ndungane; S'busiso Nkosi; S'bura Sithole; Kobus van Wyk	(substituted off) Odwa Ndungane (retired); (substituted off) S'bura Sithole (to Southern Kings)	(substituted in) Makazole Mapimpi (from Cheetahs); (substituted in) Leolin Zas (from Western Province)	Makazole Mapimpi; Lwazi Mvovo; S'busiso Nkosi; Kobus van Wyk; Leolin Zas (did not play)
FB	Clément Poitrenaud; Rhyno Smith	(substituted off) Clément Poitrenaud (retired)	(substituted in) Courtney Winnaar (from Sharks (Currie Cup))	Rhyno Smith (did not play); Courtney Winnaar (did not play)
Coach	Robert du Preez			Robert du Preez

=== Stormers ===
Stormers transfers 2017–2018
Pos	2017 squad	Out	In	2018 squad
PR	JC Janse van Rensburg; Oli Kebble; Steven Kitshoff (short-term); Wilco Louw; Frans Malherbe; Caylib Oosthuizen; Frans van Wyk; Alistair Vermaak	(substituted off) Oli Kebble (to (Scotland) Glasgow Warriors); (substituted off) Frans van Wyk (to Bulls)	(substituted in) Neethling Fouché (from Blue Bulls); (substituted in) Carlü Sadie (from Western Province)	Neethling Fouché; JC Janse van Rensburg; Steven Kitshoff; Wilco Louw; Frans Malherbe; Caylib Oosthuizen (did not play); Carlü Sadie; Alistair Vermaak (did not play)
HK	Bongi Mbonambi; Dean Muir (did not play); Ramone Samuels; Chad Solomon (did not play)	(substituted off) Chad Solomon (to Western Province)	(substituted in) Scarra Ntubeni (return from injury)	Bongi Mbonambi; Dean Muir; Scarra Ntubeni; Ramone Samuels
LK	Jan de Klerk; Pieter-Steph du Toit; Eben Etzebeth; JD Schickerling; Chris van Zyl; Eduard Zandberg (did not play)		(substituted in) Salmaan Moerat (from Western Province U21)	Jan de Klerk; Pieter-Steph du Toit; Eben Etzebeth (did not play); Salmaan Moerat; JD Schickerling; Chris van Zyl; Eduard Zandberg (did not play)
FL	Stephan de Wit; Johan du Toit (did not play); Rynhardt Elstadt; Siya Kolisi; Sikhumbuzo Notshe; Marnus Schoeman (did not play); Cobus Wiese	(substituted off) Rynhardt Elstadt (to (France) Toulouse); (substituted off) Marnus Schoeman (to Bulls)		Stephan de Wit (did not play); Johan du Toit; Siya Kolisi; Sikhumbuzo Notshe; Cobus Wiese
N8	Juarno Augustus; Nizaam Carr; Jaco Coetzee; Kobus van Dyk			Juarno Augustus; Nizaam Carr; Jaco Coetzee; Kobus van Dyk
SH	Dewaldt Duvenage; Godlen Masimla; Justin Phillips; Jano Vermaak	(substituted off) Godlen Masimla (to Southern Kings)	(substituted in) Paul de Wet (from Western Province); (substituted in) Herschel Jantjies (from Western Province)	Paul de Wet; Dewaldt Duvenage; Herschel Jantjies; Justin Phillips; Jano Vermaak
FH	Kurt Coleman; Jean-Luc du Plessis; Robert du Preez; Brandon Thomson; Damian Willemse	(substituted off) Kurt Coleman (to Southern Kings); (substituted off) Robert du Preez (to Sharks); (substituted off) Brandon Thomson (to (Scotland) Glasgow Warriors)	(substituted in) Joshua Stander (from Blue Bulls); (substituted in) George Whitehead (from Griquas)	Jean-Luc du Plessis; Joshua Stander; George Whitehead; Damian Willemse
CE	Damian de Allende; Juan de Jongh; Daniël du Plessis; Huw Jones (did not play); Dan Kriel; Shaun Treeby (short-term); EW Viljoen	(substituted off) Juan de Jongh (to (England) Wasps); (substituted off) Huw Jones (to (Scotland) Glasgow Warriors); (substituted off) Shaun Treeby (to (Japan) Honda Heat)	(substituted in) JJ Engelbrecht (from (Japan) Toyota Industries Shuttles)	Damian de Allende; Daniël du Plessis (did not play); JJ Engelbrecht; Dan Kriel (did not play); EW Viljoen
WG	Bjorn Basson; Dillyn Leyds; Khanyo Ngcukana (did not play); Seabelo Senatla	(substituted off) Bjorn Basson (to (France) Oyonnax); (substituted off) Khanyo Ngcukana (to Western Province)	(substituted in) Sergeal Petersen (from Cheetahs); (substituted in) Raymond Rhule (from Cheetahs)	Dillyn Leyds; Sergeal Petersen (did not play); Raymond Rhule; Seabelo Senatla
FB	Cheslin Kolbe; SP Marais	(substituted off) Cheslin Kolbe (to (France) Toulouse)	(substituted in) Craig Barry (loan return from Cheetahs)	Craig Barry; SP Marais
Coach	Robbie Fleck			Robbie Fleck

== See also ==
- List of 2017–18 Premiership Rugby transfers
- List of 2017–18 Pro14 transfers
- List of 2017–18 Top 14 transfers
- List of 2017–18 RFU Championship transfers
- SANZAAR
- Super Rugby franchise areas
