= Entienne Swanepoel =

South African rugby union player

- Full name: Jacobus Christoffel Entienne Swanepoel
- Born: 9 March 1993 (age 33) Sasolburg, South Africa
- Height: 1.90 m (6 ft 3 in)
- Weight: 124 kg (273 lb; 19 st 7 lb)
- School: Hoërskool Tygerberg, Cape Town

Rugby union career
- Position: Tighthead prop
- Current team: Rugby Rovigo Delta
Youth career
- 2011–2014: Western Province
Senior career
Years	Team	Apps	(Points)
2014–2015	Western Province	8	(0)
2015	Boland Cavaliers	1	(0)
2016	Blue Bulls	13	(0)
2017	Stade Français	2	(0)
2017	Southern Kings	4	(0)
2018	→ Eastern Province Elephants	1	(0)
2018–2019	Valsugana	21	(5)
2019–2020	Petrarca Padova	8	(0)
2020–present	Rovigo Delta		
- Correct as of 30 April 2020
International career
Years	Team	Apps	(Points)
2021−2022	Italy A	3	(0)

Jacobus Christoffel Entienne Swanepoel (born 9 March 1993) is a South African born Italian rugby union player for Italian Top12 side Rugby Rovigo Delta. His regular position is tighthead prop.

== Club career ==
=== Western Province ===
Swanepoel was born in Sasolburg, but grew up in Cape Town. He was selected to represent Western Province at the premier high schools rugby union tournament in South Africa, the Under-18 Craven Week, held in Kimberley in 2011.

After high school, he joined the Western Province Academy and made seven appearances for their Under-19 team in the 2012 Under-19 Provincial Championship. However, he missed out on the title play-offs, which saw his side crowned champions by beating the Blue Bulls U19 team 22–18 in Durban.

He made nine appearances for their Under-21 team that finished top of the 2013 Under-21 Provincial Championship to qualify for the semi-finals. This time, Swanepoel did play in the play-off matches, starting their 44–41 victory over the Golden Lions in the semi-final and their 30–23 victory over the Blue Bulls in the final.

At the start of the following year, Swanepoel was included in the Western Province squad for the 2014 Vodacom Cup. He made his first class debut in their opening match of the competition against near-neighbours Boland Cavaliers in a 16–8 victory. He made a further four starts during the regular season, helping Western Province to finish in fourth position in the Southern Section. He also started in their quarter final match, where a 13–8 defeat to the Pumas ended their interest in the competition. He started in Western Province U21s' opening match of the 2014 Under-21 Provincial Championship, but suffered a knee injury that ruled him out of the remainder of 2014.

He returned to action for Western Province during the 2015 Vodacom Cup competition, making two appearances; he started their 34–6 victory over the Border Bulldogs and came on as a replacement in their 47–22 win over a Leopards XV.

He was named in their senior squad for the 2015 Currie Cup Premier Division, but failed to make any appearances. He was loaned to the Boland Cavaliers, where he made his Currie Cup debut by coming on as a replacement in their 17–61 defeat to the Leopards in Potchefstroom, his only appearance in the competition.

=== Blue Bulls ===
In August 2015, the Blue Bulls announced that they secured Swanepoel's services until October 2017. He made his debut for them in the 2016 Currie Cup qualification series by starting in their 16–30 defeat to his former side, Western Province, making a total of ten appearances in the competition. He was then named in their squad for the 2016 Currie Cup Premier Division.

=== Stade Français ===
Swanepoel joined French Top 14 side Stade Français at the start of 2017.

=== Southern Kings ===
He returned to South Africa to join the Southern Kings for their first season in the expanded Pro14 competition. He was used as a replacement in their first two matches of the season against Scarlets and Connacht, but suffered a concussion that ruled him out for their next two matches. After a further two appearances as a replacement against the Dragons and Benetton, he suffered a knee injury that ruled him out for six weeks, but he failed to make any further appearances during the season.

He made a single appearance for the Eastern Province Elephants on loan from the Kings in the domestic Rugby Challenge competition, starting their opening match of the competition against Western Province.

=== Valsugana, Petrarca, Rovigo ===
In July 2018, Italian side Valsugana announced that Swanepoel would join them for their inaugural season in the Top12 following promotion from Serie A. The following season, Swanepoel signed a one-year contract with the other team from Padova, Petrarca. After the premature cancellation of the championship amidst the COVID-19 emergency, on April 30, 2020, he was subsequently drafted by Rugby Rovigo Delta for the incoming season

== International career ==
On the 14 October 2021, he was selected by Alessandro Troncon to be part of an Italy A 28-man squad and on 16 December was named in Emerging Italy squad for the 2021 end-of-year rugby union internationals.
