= Siya Mdaka =

South African rugby union player

- Full name: Siyabulela Mdaka
- Born: 14 February 1988 (age 38) Mthatha, South Africa
- Height: 1.87 m (6 ft 1 1/2 in)
- Weight: 104 kg (229 lb; 16 st 5 lb)
- School: George Campbell School of Technology / Ikwezi Tech
- University: North-West University

Rugby union career
- Position: Flanker
- Current team: Leopards (rugby union)
Youth career
- 2004: Border Country Districts
- 2006–2009: Sharks
Amateur team(s)
Years	Team	Apps	(Points)
2010–2012	NWU Pukke	20	(10)
Senior career
Years	Team	Apps	(Points)
2011	Leopards	4	(0)
2012–2017	Border Bulldogs	75	(10)
2017–2018	Southern Kings	3	(0)
2018	Eastern Province Elephants	8	(0)
2018–	Leopards	6	(0)
2018–2019	CS Dinamo București	13	(0)
- Correct as of 27 March 2022

Siyabulela Mdaka (born 14 February 1988 in Mthatha) is a South African rugby union player who last played for the Leopards (rugby union) in the Currie Cup and in the Rugby Challenge. His regular position is flanker.

== Career ==
=== Youth and Varsity rugby ===
He played for Border Country Districts at the 2004 Under-16 Grant Khomo Week competition before moving to Durban, where he played for Natal at the 2006 Under-18 Academy Week tournament. He progressed through the Sharks academy system and played for the Sharks U19 side in 2007 and the Sharks U21 side in 2008 and 2009.

In 2010, he moved to Potchefstroom, where he represented local university side NWU Pukke in the Varsity Cup competition in 2010, 2011 and 2012, making twenty appearances in total.

=== Leopards ===
During his spell in Potchefstroom, he also made his first class debut for the Leopards. He was included in their squad for the 2011 Currie Cup Premier Division competition and made his debut by starting their match against the Blue Bulls at the Royal Bafokeng Stadium. He made one more start, as well as two substitute appearances during that competition.

=== Border Bulldogs ===
After the conclusion of the 2012 Varsity Cup competition, Mdaka returned to the Eastern Cape and joined First Division strugglers Border Bulldogs. He made three appearances for them during the 2012 Currie Cup First Division and was a regular in 2013, making six appearances in the 2013 Vodacom Cup and twelve in the 2013 Currie Cup First Division.
