= Ross Geldenhuys =

South African rugby union player

- Full name: Ross Geldenhuys
- Born: 19 April 1983 (age 43) Cape Town, South Africa
- Height: 1.89 m (6 ft 2 1/2 in)
- Weight: 120 kg (260 lb; 18 st 13 lb)
- School: St. Andrew's College, Grahamstown
- Notable relative: Piet Geldenhuys (father)

Rugby union career
- Position: Tighthead Prop
- Current team: Bay of Plenty
Youth career
- 2002: Mighty Elephants
- 2003: Western Province
Amateur team(s)
Years	Team	Apps	(Points)
2014–2016	Waitohi		
2018–2018	Papamoa		
2019–Present	Rangiuru		
Senior career
Years	Team	Apps	(Points)
2005	Border Bulldogs	3	(0)
2006	Western Province	0	(0)
2007	Pumas	17	(10)
2008–2011	Lions	19	(0)
2008–2010	Golden Lions	22	(5)
2009–2011	Golden Lions XV	11	(0)
2009	→ Blue Bulls	0	(0)
2012	Boland Cavaliers	5	(0)
2012	Free State Cheetahs	8	(10)
2012	→ Griffons	2	(0)
2013	Eastern Province Kings	14	(5)
2013	→ Stormers	0	(0)
2013	→ Western Province	0	(0)
2014–2016	Tasman	33	(10)
2015–2016	Highlanders	20	(0)
2017	Southern Kings	13	(0)
2017	Sharks (Currie Cup)	13	(5)
2018	Sharks	5	(0)
2018	Sharks XV	3	(5)
2018–present	Bay of Plenty	0	(0)
–	Hurricanes		
–	Chiefs		
- Correct as of 21 July 2018
International career
Years	Team	Apps	(Points)
2012	South African Barbarians (South)	1	(0)
- Correct as of 21 February 2013

Ross Geldenhuys (born 19 April 1983) is a South African rugby union footballer. His regular playing position is as a tighthead prop and he plays for Bay of Plenty in the Mitre 10 Cup in New Zealand. Geldenhuys holds the record of playing for the most provinces in South Africa; he played for eight of the fourteen provinces — Border Bulldogs, Pumas, Golden Lions, Boland Cavaliers, Free State Cheetahs, Griffons, Eastern Province Kings and Sharks. In addition, he spent time at the Blue Bulls and Western Province, but failed to appear in a first class match for them.

In 2013, he represented the Eastern Province Kings in the Currie Cup. He was initially named in the Southern Kings squad for the 2013 Super Rugby season, but was later released to the 2013 Vodacom Cup squad.

In New Zealand, he played ITM Cup rugby for Tasman and signed for the championship winning Highlanders for the 2015 Super Rugby season, including an appearance in the final. In 2018 he made his debut for the Sharks and was signed to play for the Hurricanes in NZ the next year. After a stunning provincial season with the Bay of Plenty he was picked for the Chief's 2020 wider squad and made his debut against the Crusaders in week 3 and was on the bench the following 2 weeks.
