= Mzamo Majola =

South African rugby union player

Mzamo Sean Majola
- Born: 20 February 1995 (age 31) Durban, South Africa
- Height: 1.82 m (5 ft 11 1/2 in)
- Weight: 115 kg (254 lb; 18 st 2 lb)
- School: Westville Boys' High School, Westville
- University: Varsity College, Durban North

Rugby union career
- Position: Prop
- Current team: Seattle Seawolves
Youth career
- 2013–2016: Sharks
Senior career
Years	Team	Apps	(Points)
2015–2018	Sharks XV	21	(0)
2015–2021	Sharks (Currie Cup)	19	(0)
2017	→ Southern Kings	6	(0)
2018–2021	Sharks	21	(5)
2022–	Seattle Seawolves	17	(10)
2022–	→ Cheetahs		
- Correct as of 16 January 2022
International career
Years	Team	Apps	(Points)
2015	South Africa Under-20	4	(0)
- Correct as of 22 June 2015

Mzamo Sean Majola (born 20 February 1995 in Durban, South Africa) commonly known as “ MJ” and known for his well- spoken American accent is a South African rugby union player for the Seattle Seawolves in MLR ( Major League Rugby). His regular position is prop.

== Career ==
He represented the Sharks at the premier South African high school rugby competition, the Under-18 Craven Week held in Polokwane in July 2013, making three appearances. He joined the Sharks Academy after finishing high school and represented the Sharks U19 side in the 2014 Under-19 Provincial Championship, starting all thirteen of their matches in the loosehead prop position as they reached the semi-final of the competition, where they were defeated 20–43 by the Blue Bulls U19.

Despite being included in the UKZN Impi squad for the 2015 Varsity Shield, he made no appearances for them. He did, however, make his first class debut on 28 March 2015, coming on as a substitute for the Sharks XV in their 2015 Vodacom Cup match against Western Province in Crawford, Cape Town. He also played off the bench in their next match against a Free State XV in Kokstad.

He was named in a 37-man training squad for the South Africa national under-20 rugby union team and featured for them in a friendly match against a Varsity Cup Dream Team in April 2015. He was also included in the squad that embarked on a two-match tour of Argentina. He came on as a replacement in their 25–22 victory over Argentina and started their 39–28 victory a few days later.

Upon the team's return, he was named in the final squad for the 2015 World Rugby Under 20 Championship. He didn't feature in the first of their three matches in Pool B of the competition, a 33–5 win against hosts Italy, but came on as a replacement in their 40–8 win against Samoa and in their 46–13 win over Australia to help South Africa finish top of Pool B to qualify for the semi-finals with the best record pool stage of all the teams in the competition. Majola also played off the bench in their semi-final match against England, but could not prevent them losing 20–28 to be eliminated from the competition by England for the second year in succession as well as in their third-place play-off match against France, helping South Africa to a 31–18 win to secure third place in the competition.
