= Waylon Murray =

South Africa international rugby union player

- Full name: Waylon Michael Murray
- Born: 27 April 1986 (age 40) Durban, KwaZulu-Natal, South Africa
- Height: 1.91 m (6 ft 3 in)
- Weight: 101 kg (223 lb; 15 st 13 lb)
- School: Westville Boys High School
- University: University of Natal, BComm Marketing

Rugby union career
- Position: Centre
Youth career
- 2004–2005: Sharks
Senior career
Years	Team	Apps	(Points)
2005–2010	Sharks XV	8	(0)
2005–2010	Sharks (Currie Cup)	52	(90)
2006–2010	Sharks	41	(25)
2010–2012	Golden Lions	19	(25)
2011–2012	Lions	14	(15)
2013	Southern Kings	8	(0)
2013	Eastern Province Kings	1	(0)
2013–2014	Blue Bulls	14	(10)
2014	Bulls	0	(0)
2015	Sharks	8	(0)
2015	Sharks (Currie Cup)	1	(0)
2016–2017	Eastern Province Kings	9	(5)
2017	Southern Kings	6	(0)
2017–2018	Mâcon	8	(5)
- Correct as of 23 April 2018
International career
Years	Team	Apps	(Points)
2006	South Africa Under-21	5	(15)
2007	South Africa	4	(0)
- Correct as of 23 April 2018

Waylon Michael Murray (born 27 April 1986 in Durban, South Africa) is a rugby union player. He has retired from professional rugby and is now the director of sport at Kearsney College. He stands 190 cm tall and weighs in at 105 kg and plays the position of centre or wing.

He went to Westville Boys High School where he was a prefect and head of school in 2003 and played in the 1st XV from 2002 to 2004. He was awarded an Honours blazer for Athletics in Std 9 and then Honours for Rugby in both his matric and post-matric years making the KZN Schools Rugby team in 2004. He also played First XI Cricket and First Team Soccer (having achieved South African age-group representative Honours).

== Career ==
=== Sharks ===
During his debut season in the 2006 Currie Cup and Super 14 season for the Sharks and Sharks, Murray showed great promise as a quality centre for his provincial team. Parlaying those performances into his debut Super 14 season in 2007, Murray slowly rose to prominence as one of South Africa's leading centres, owing in no small part to his tenacity on defence and astute ball distribution skills, often, with former provincial team-mate Brad Barritt, providing a valuable link to the wings and offering stability to The Sharks midfield. Murray's stunning form saw him being selected for the Springboks away leg of the 2007 Tri Nations as the first choice centres were being rested for the World Cup. However he narrowly missed selection to the victorious South Africa squad for the 2007 Rugby World Cup. The Murray and Barritt partnership was however disrupted after François Steyn's superb performances in the number 12 jersey for the Springboks during the 2007 Rugby World Cup. This meant that Murray had to challenge Barritt for the no. 13 shirt during much of 2008 Super 14 season, but the partnership resumed during the ABSA Currie Cup due to the absence of François Steyn and Adi Jacobs. However, with the return of the Springboks, and with Adi Jacobs' stunning form, Murray saw little game time. Murray was injured during the whole of the 2009 Super 14, and slowly began to be exposed to rugby during the Currie Cup, after a seven-month absence.

=== Lions ===
On 7 June 2010, the Sharks agreed to release him from his contract so he could join the Lions.

=== Kings ===
At the end of 2012, his Lions contract expired and he joined the Eastern Province Kings, also being named in the Southern Kings wider training group for the 2013 Super Rugby season. However, having recently undergone knee surgery, he was struggling for full fitness for a large part of the campaign and made just four starts and three substitute appearances during the Super Rugby season. He also played in the second leg of the Kings' Promotion/relegation play-offs series against the Lions. He also made one appearance in the 2013 Vodacom Cup for the Eastern Province Kings, appearing as a substitute in their match against the Border Bulldogs.

=== Bulls ===
After the 2013 Super Rugby season, he joined the Blue Bulls, signing a contract at the team until October 2015. He failed to break into their Super Rugby squad, however, being limited to six appearances in the 2013 Currie Cup Premier Division and eight in the 2014 Vodacom Cup.

=== Sharks (2015) ===
He returned to Durban, where he linked up with the Sharks for pre-season training prior to the 2015 Super Rugby season. He was released by the Sharks in November 2015.

=== AS Mâcon ===
After the 2017 Super Rugby season, Murray moved to France to join Mâcon.
