= S'bura Sithole =

South African rugby union player (born 1990)

- Full name: Sibusiso Camagu Thokozani Sithole
- Born: 14 June 1990 (age 36) Queenstown, South Africa
- Height: 1.82 m (5 ft 11 1/2 in)
- Weight: 94 kg (207 lb; 14 st 11 lb)
- School: Queen’s College
- Occupation: Professional Rugby Player

Rugby union career
- Position: Centre / Winger
- Current team: HKU Sandy Bay RFC
Youth career
- 2006–2008: Border Bulldogs
- 2009–2011: Sharks
Senior career
Years	Team	Apps	(Points)
2010–2017	Sharks XV	36	(90)
2011–2017	Sharks (Currie Cup)	46	(60)
2013–2017	Sharks	35	(20)
2017–2020	Southern Kings	18	(0)
2021–2021	Getxo RT	5	(10)
2021–2022	Stade Niortais	0	(0)
2022–Present	HKU Sandy Bay	0	(0)
- Correct as of 9 September 2021
International career
Years	Team	Apps	(Points)
2010	South Africa Under-20	3	(20)
2010–2013	South Africa Sevens		
- Correct as of 7 April 2018
Medal record
Men's rugby sevens
Representing South Africa
Commonwealth Games
Bronze medal – third place	2010 Delhi	Team competition

Sibusiso Camagu Thokozani "S'bura" Sithole (born 14 June 1990) is a South African rugby union player. He plays as a winger or centre for the HKU Sandy Bay.

== Representative rugby ==
In 2013, Sithole was included in the squad for the 2013 Rugby World Cup Sevens.

In May 2014, Sithole was one of eight uncapped players that were called up to a Springbok training camp prior to the 2014 mid-year rugby union tests.
