= Mzwanele Zito =

South African rugby union player

- Full name: Mzwanele Richman Zito
- Born: 23 November 1988 (age 37) Uitenhage, South Africa
- Height: 1.95 m (6 ft 5 in)
- Weight: 108 kg (238 lb; 17 st 0 lb)
- School: Solomon Mahlangu High School
- University: Boland College

Rugby union career
- Position: Lock
- Current team: Cheetahs / Free State Cheetahs
Youth career
- 2006: Eastern Province Kings
- 2007–2009: Western Province
Amateur team(s)
Years	Team	Apps	(Points)
2011–2013	NMMU Madibaz	21	(0)
Senior career
Years	Team	Apps	(Points)
2013	Eastern Province Kings	1	(0)
2013–2015	SWD Eagles	47	(30)
2016–2017	Griquas	21	(10)
2017	Southern Kings	9	(0)
2017	Eastern Province Kings	4	(0)
2017–2019	Carcassonne	43	(15)
2020–2022	Griquas	16	(10)
2022–	Cheetahs		
2023–	Free State Cheetahs		
- Correct as of 10 July 2022
International career
Years	Team	Apps	(Points)
2006	South Africa Under-19		
- Correct as of 22 April 2018

Mzwanele Richman Zito (born 23 November 1988) is a South African rugby union player, currently playing with Carcassonne in the French Pro D2. His regular position is lock.

== Career ==
Zito played for the Eastern Province Kings in the 2006 Under-18 Academy Week and was included in the South Africa squad that competed in the Confederation of African Rugby Under-18 tournament. He joined Western Province and played for them at Under-19 and Under-21 level. Despite being included in their squad for the 2009 Vodacom Cup, he did not make an appearance.

Zito then played for the NMMU Madibaz in the 2011, 2012 and 2013 Varsity Cup competitions, which earned him a call-up to the Eastern Province Kings 2013 Vodacom Cup squad. He made his debut against Free State XV.

After the 2013 Vodacom Cup season, he signed a two-year contract with the SWD Eagles prior to the 2013 Currie Cup First Division.

=== Griquas ===
Zito joined Kimberley-based side Griquas for the 2016 season.

=== Carcassonne ===
Zito moved to France to join Pro D2 side Carcassonne as a medical joker in August 2017.
