= Jacques Nel =

South African rugby union player (born 1993)

- Full name: Jacques Jehan Nel
- Born: 17 March 1993 (age 33) Port Elizabeth, South Africa
- Height: 1.86 m (6 ft 1 in)
- Weight: 91 kg (201 lb; 14 st 5 lb)
- School: Hoërskool Brandwag, Benoni
- Notable relative: Ruhan Nel (brother)

Rugby union career
- Position: Centre / Winger
- Current team: Aurillac
Youth career
- 2011: Falcons
- 2012–2014: Golden Lions
Amateur team(s)
Years	Team	Apps	(Points)
2014–2015	UJ	8	(5)
Senior career
Years	Team	Apps	(Points)
2013–2017	Golden Lions XV	20	(45)
2015–2017	Golden Lions	13	(40)
2016–2017	Lions	11	(0)
2017–2018	Southern Kings	13	(10)
2018–present	Aurillac	0	(0)
- Correct as of 6 May 2018

Jacques Jehan Nel (born 17 March 1993) is a South African professional rugby union player for Aurillac in the Rugby Pro D2. His regular position is centre or winger.

== Career ==
Nel was born in Port Elizabeth, but grew up in Benoni, where he earned an inclusion to the Falcons squad that competed at the Under-18 Craven Week tournament held in Kimberley in 2011. He started three matches and scored a try against the SWD Eagles.

Nel made the very short move to Johannesburg to the Golden Lions Academy after high school. He appeared in all thirteen of the Golden Lions U19s' matches during the 2012 Under-19 Provincial Championship, starting twelve of those. He scored a try in both of their matches against Free State U19 and two tries against SWD U21 in George to help his side secure a semi-final place. However, they lost in the semi-finals, with Western Province U21 winning the match 24–14 in Stellenbosch.

Nel made his first class debut on 15 March 2013; he was included in the Golden Lions squad for the 2013 Vodacom Cup competition and started their Round Two match against former side the Falcons in a 22–27 defeat. He started two more matches in losses to the Blue Bulls and Griffons respectively, but didn't feature in the play-offs. The Golden Lions won the competition, beating the Pumas 42–28 in the final in Nelspruit.

Despite still being in the Under-20 age-group, Nel started all thirteen of the Golden Lions' matches in the 2013 Under-21 Provincial Championship. He scored six tries – including a brace in their match against eventual champions Western Province U21 – as the Golden Lions finished in fourth spot. However, Nel lost in a semi-final to Western Province for the second consecutive year, who beat Golden Lions U21 44–41 after extra time.

Nel started the 2014 season by representing UJ in the 2014 Varsity Cup competition. He started in all seven their matches and scored a try in their 32–15 victory over rival Johannesburg-based university side Wits. It proved to be a disappointing campaign for UJ, however, as they finished second-bottom in the competition to qualify for a relegation play-off match against UKZN Impi. Nel also started this match, as UJ ran out 42–8 victors to retain their Varsity Cup status for 2015. He started ten matches for Golden Lions U21 in the 2014 Under-21 Provincial Championship and contributed four tries – two of those in their match against Free State U21 in Bloemfontein – as they once again reached the semi-finals only to be eliminated at that stage, this time by the Blue Bulls U21s, who won 23–19 in Pretoria.

Nel made five starts and two substitute appearances for the Golden Lions during the 2015 Vodacom Cup. He scored two tries in their match against the Pumas in a 24–16 victory in Nelspruit as they went through the regular season unbeaten to finish top of the Northern Section log. He scored his third try of the season in their 29–21 victory over the SWD Eagles, but was not a member of the side that lost their semi-final 20–43 to the Pumas a week later.

Nel was included in the Golden Lions' Currie Cup side for the 2015 Currie Cup Premier Division and was named on the bench for their Round Five match against the Eastern Province Kings in Johannesburg.

=== Aurillac ===
Nel moved to French Pro D2 side Aurillac prior to the 2018–19 season.

=== Statistics ===
As of 3 September 2015.

First class career
Season	Teams	Currie Cup		Vodacom Cup		Other		Total	
Season	Teams	Apps	Pts	Apps	Pts	Apps	Pts	Apps	Pts
2013	Golden Lions	—	—	3	0	—	—	3	0
2014	Golden Lions	—	—	—	—	—	—	0	0
2015	Golden Lions	—	—	7	15	—	—	7	15
Career Total		—	—	10	15	—	—	10	15

== Personal life ==
He is the younger brother of South Africa Sevens international Ruhan Nel.
