= Rowan Gouws =

South African rugby union player

- Full name: Rowan Petrus Christiaan Gouws
- Born: 6 August 1995 (age 31) Richards Bay, South Africa
- Height: 1.77 m (5 ft 9 1/2 in)
- Weight: 80 kg (180 lb; 12 st 8 lb)
- School: Hoër Tegniese Skool Middelburg, Middelburg
- University: University of KwaZulu-Natal

Rugby union career
- Position: Scrum-half
Youth career
- 2008–2013: Pumas
- 2014–2016: Sharks
Amateur team(s)
Years	Team	Apps	(Points)
2015	UKZN Impi		
Senior career
Years	Team	Apps	(Points)
2016–2017	Sharks XV	8	(0)
2017–2018	Eastern Province Elephants	2	(5)
2017–2018	Southern Kings	11	(0)
2020–	Rugby ATL		
- Correct as of 6 May 2021

Rowan Petrus Christiaan Gouws (born 6 August 1995) is a South African rugby union player who currently plays for Rugby ATL of Major League Rugby (MLR) in the United States. His regular position is scrum-half.

He previously played for the Eastern Province Elephants in the Currie Cup and the Rugby Challenge.

== Rugby career ==
=== Schoolboy rugby ===
Gouws was born in Richards Bay, but grew up in Mpumalanga, where he attended Hoër Tegniese Skool Middelburg. He represented the local rugby union, the Pumas at the Under-13 Craven Week in 2008, the Under-16 Grant Khomo Week in 2011 and the Under-18 Craven Week held in Polokwane in 2013.

=== Sharks ===
After school, he moved to Durban to join the Sharks academy. He played for their Under-19 team in the 2014 Under-19 Provincial Championship and for their Under-21 team in the Under-21 Provincial Championships in 2015 and 2016. He also played in the 2015 Varsity Shield competition with the UKZN Impi.

He made his first class debut in the 2016 Currie Cup qualification series, coming on as a replacement in the Sharks XV's 32–37 defeat to the Border Bulldogs in East London. He made a further five starts and two appearances as a replacement for the Sharks XV in the 2017 Rugby Challenge competition.

=== Eastern Province Kings / Southern Kings ===
In the second half of 2017, Gouws moved to Port Elizabeth to continue his rugby career. After a single match for the Eastern Province Kings in the 2017 Currie Cup First Division against the Griffons in Welkom, he appeared for the Southern Kings in their inaugural season in the Pro14 competition. He made his debut in the competition as a replacement against the Dragons in Newport. After a further three appearances as a replacement, he made his first start in their match against the Cheetahs in Port Elizabeth, eventually playing in eleven matches for a Southern Kings side that finished bottom of Conference B with just a single victory all season.

Gouws also played for the Eastern Province Elephants – the new name for the Eastern Province Kings – in the 2018 Rugby Challenge.
