= Godlen Masimla =

South African rugby union player

- Full name: Godlen Herschelle Derrick Masimla
- Born: 11 August 1992 (age 34) Wellington, South Africa
- Height: 1.77 m (5 ft 9 1/2 in)
- Weight: 80 kg (180 lb; 12 st 8 lb)
- School: Huguenot High School, Wellington
- University: University of the Western Cape

Rugby union career
- Position: Scrum-half / Winger
- Current team: Stormers / Western Province
Youth career
- 2010: Boland Cavaliers
- 2011: Golden Lions U19
- 2012–2013: Western Province U21
Amateur team(s)
Years	Team	Apps	(Points)
2012–2013	UWC	6	(20)
Senior career
Years	Team	Apps	(Points)
2013–2017	Western Province	50	(30)
2015–2017	Stormers	4	(0)
2017–2018	Southern Kings	25	(15)
2019–present	Western Province	29	(25)
2020–	Stormers	16	(5)
- Correct as of 23 July 2022

Godlen Herschelle Derrick Masimla (born 11 August 1992 in Wellington) is a South African rugby union player for Western Province in the Currie Cup and the Rugby Challenge. His regular position is scrum-half or winger.

== Career ==
=== Youth and Varsity rugby ===
After appearing for the Boland Cavaliers side at the 2010 Under-18 Craven Week tournament, Masimla moved to Johannesburg to join the Golden Lions U19 side in 2011. However, after just one season, he returned to the Western Cape, where he played Varsity Shield rugby for UWC in 2012 and 2013.

He also played for the Western Province U21 side in the Under-21 Provincial Championship competitions in 2012 and 2013, helping them two finals in each season and winning the title in 2013.

=== Western Province ===
In 2013, Masimla was included in the Western Province squad for the 2013 Vodacom Cup competition. He made his first class debut in the opening match of the season against the Boland Cavaliers in Ceres, his first start two weeks later against the Eastern Province Kings in Port Elizabeth and eventually featured in all eight Western Province's matches in the competition.

In 2014, Masimla was selected in the Stormers wider training group prior to the 2014 Super Rugby season and subsequently in the final squad. However, a serious wrist injury sustained in the opening match of the 2014 Vodacom Cup competition against the Boland Cavaliers ruled him out of any involvement with the Super Rugby side.
