= Luzuko Vulindlu =

South African rugby union player

- Born: 14 November 1987 (age 38) Grahamstown, South Africa
- Height: 1.83 m (6 ft 0 in)
- Weight: 98 kg (216 lb; 15 st 6 lb)
- School: Durban High School

Rugby union career
- Position: Winger
Youth career
- 2004: Eastern Province Kings
- 2005–2008: Sharks
Senior career
Years	Team	Apps	(Points)
2008–2010	Sharks XV	13	(10)
2009	Sharks	9	(5)
2009	Sharks Invitational XV	1	(0)
2009–2011	Sharks (Currie Cup)	6	(5)
2011–2012	Auch	14	(5)
2012–2013	Griquas	11	(10)
2013–2016	SWD Eagles	34	(25)
2016–2018	Southern Kings	41	(45)
- Correct as of 23 April 2018
International career
Years	Team	Apps	(Points)
2009	Emerging Springboks	1	(0)
- Correct as of 23 April 2018

Luzuko Vulindlu (born 14 November 1987) is a South African professional rugby union player who last played for the Southern Kings in the Pro14. His regular playing positions are centre and winger.

== Playing career ==
=== Sharks / Emerging Springboks ===
Vulindlu moved to Durban to join the Sharks academy in 2005, representing them at Under-19 level in 2005 and 2006 and at Under-21 level in 2007.

In 2008, Vulindlu made his first class debut for the Sharks' Vodacom Cup team – then called the Natal Wildebeest – by starting as the inside centre in a 32–7 victory over the Griffons in Welkom. After an appearance off the bench against the Golden Lions to make his home debut, he was restored to the starting line-up for their match against the Falcons, starting as outside centre. He opened the scoring for the Wildebeest in the fourth minute of the match, but his side fell short, losing 28–35 in the match played in Brakpan. He made one more start during the regular season, helping the Wildebeest to fourth spot on the Southern Section log to secure a quarter final spot, and also came on as a replacement in the quarter final match against Western Province, which the team from Cape Town won 22–14 to eliminate the Wildebeest from the competition. In July 2008, he played for the Sharks in their compulsory friendly match against the Griffons, kicking a conversion in the final minutes of a 44–15 victory for the Sharks. He reverted to Under-21 level for the remainder of 2008, appearing for the Sharks U21s in the Under-21 Provincial Championship.

In 2009, Vulindlu was he was included in the Sharks squad for the 2009 Super 14 season. He was an unused replacement in their first match of the season, a 20–15 victory over the Stormers in Cape Town. A week later, he did make his Super Rugby debut, coming on as a late replacement against the Lions in Durban. He made a further four appearances off the bench before he was handed his first start in their match against the Hurricanes. He was named as their starting left winger and took advantage of the opportunity, scoring his first Super Rugby try and being named the Man of the Match in the Sharks' 33–17 victory. He also started their next match against the Cheetahs in Bloemfontein and played off the bench in two more matches during a season that saw the Sharks finish in sixth position, missing out on the play-offs.

Soon after the Super Rugby season, Vulindlu played in the Sharks' match against the British & Irish Lions during their 2009 tour to South Africa, which the Sharks lost 3–39. He had another opportunity to face the touring side, as he was selected in an Emerging Springboks side that faced the Lions two weeks later. He started the match and helped his side secure a 13–all draw against the tourists. Vulindlu again played for the Sharks in a compulsory friendly match, helping them to a 44–35 win over the Pumas, before being included in the Sharks' Currie Cup squad for the first time. He started their defeat to Western Province and came on as a replacement against the Boland Cavaliers a week later in a 46–10 win, but made just one more appearance in a 34–20 victory over the Leopards.

In 2011, Vulindlu made just one appearance for the Sharks XV during the 2011 Vodacom Cup competition, coming on as a replacement in their 67–26 victory over the Falcons in Margate.

=== Auch ===
In 2011, Vulindlu joined French Pro D2 team Auch for the 2011–12 Rugby Pro D2 season. He made his first appearance for his new team in a 15–9 victory over Albi, starting the match as the inside centre. He made this position his own, starting thirteen matches in that position during the course of the season, scoring one try in his eighth match for Auch against Aix. He also appeared as a replacement in one match, for an overall record of one try in fourteen appearances for his side.

=== Griquas ===
After just one season at Auch, he returned to South Africa, where he joined Griquas on a trial basis prior to the 2012 Currie Cup Premier Division season. He was included in their squad for the competition and made his first start for Griquas in their 20–35 defeat to the Blue Bulls in Pretoria in the opening round of the competition. He made his second start for Griquas four weeks later, helping them to a 22–15 victory over his former side, the Sharks. He also made one appearance as a replacement in their 21–45 defeat to Western Province in Round Seven of the competition as Griquas finished in fifth position in the six-team competition.

Vulindlu played more regularly for the Kimberley-based side in the 2013 Vodacom Cup competition; after three appearances off the bench – the second of which saw him score two tries in a 124–5 victory over the Limpopo Blue Bulls in Groblersdal – he started their matches against the Golden Lions, Leopards XV and the Falcons during the regular season to help Griquas finish in third position on the Northern Section log to qualify for the play-off quarter finals. He started their quarter final match against Western Province, where a 21–13 victory from the team from Cape Town promptly ended Griquas involvement in the competition.

After a loan spell at the SWD Eagles, he made one more appearance for Griquas, starting their 28–35 defeat to the Golden Lions in their final match of the season to finish bottom of the log. They qualified for a promotion/relegation play-off series against the Pumas – which they eventually lost, forcing them to play in a 2014 Currie Cup qualification series for a spot in the 2014 Currie Cup Premier Division – but Vulindlu had no involvement in these matches.

=== SWD Eagles ===
Vulindlu joined George-based side SWD Eagles on loan from Griquas during the 2013 Currie Cup First Division season. He featured in their final four matches of the regular season of the competition, helping them to finish in fourth spot and qualify for the semi-finals. He didn't play in the semi-final, as the SWD Eagles lost 33–52 to the Pumas to be knocked out of the competition.

Vulindlu's loan move was made permanent when he was contracted by SWD for 2014. Due to injury, he didn't feature for them at all during their 2014 Vodacom Cup campaign which saw them reach the quarter finals, but returned to action for their 2014 Currie Cup qualification series. He made four starts in the competition, scoring a match-deciding try in their 40–37 victory over the Griffons in Round Two. However, the SWD Eagles finished in fourth spot on the log, failing to clinch the 2014 Currie Cup Premier Division berth, instead qualifying to the 2014 Currie Cup First Division. Vulindlu played in their 29–21 victory over the Leopards and their 19–24 defeat to the Falcons in their opening two matches of the competition, but missed the rest of the season, with the SWD Eagles reaching the semi-finals of the competition, where they lost 43–45 to eventual champions the Griffons.

Vulindlu started seven of the SWD Eagles' matches during the 2015 Vodacom Cup competition in the inside centre position. He helped them finish in fourth spot in the Southern Section of the competition to qualify for their second consecutive quarter finals, but could not prevent them losing their match at that stage, with the team that topped the Northern Section log, the Golden Lions, winning the match 29–21 to eliminate the SWD Eagles from the competition. He also started all six of their matches in the 2015 Currie Cup qualification series, scoring one try against his former side, Griquas in a 21–41 defeat. The SWD Eagles had a poor season, finishing bottom of the log with just one victory to their name to qualify for the 2015 Currie Cup First Division. They lost their first match against the Leopards, but then went on a run, winning their remaining four matches. Vulindlu was again a key member, starting all five of their matches, scoring a try in the SWD Eagles' 57–14 victory over the Boland Cavaliers, as his side ended the season in third place, setting up a semi-final match against the Griffons in Welkom. Vulindlu started that match, in which his side upset the defending champions, running out 47–40 winners. He also started the final against the Leopards in Potchefstroom, scoring a try to help his side to a 20–3 lead after 25 minutes in the match, but they could not hold on, as the hosts scored all the remaining points in the match to win 44–20 to secure the title.

=== Southern Kings ===
At the start of 2016, Vulindlu was one of two SWD Eagles players that joined the Southern Kings' Super Rugby squad for a trial period as they prepared for the 2016 Super Rugby season. After training with the side for a few weeks, it was confirmed that his trial was successful and was included in the squad.
