= Schalk Ferreira =

South African rugby union player

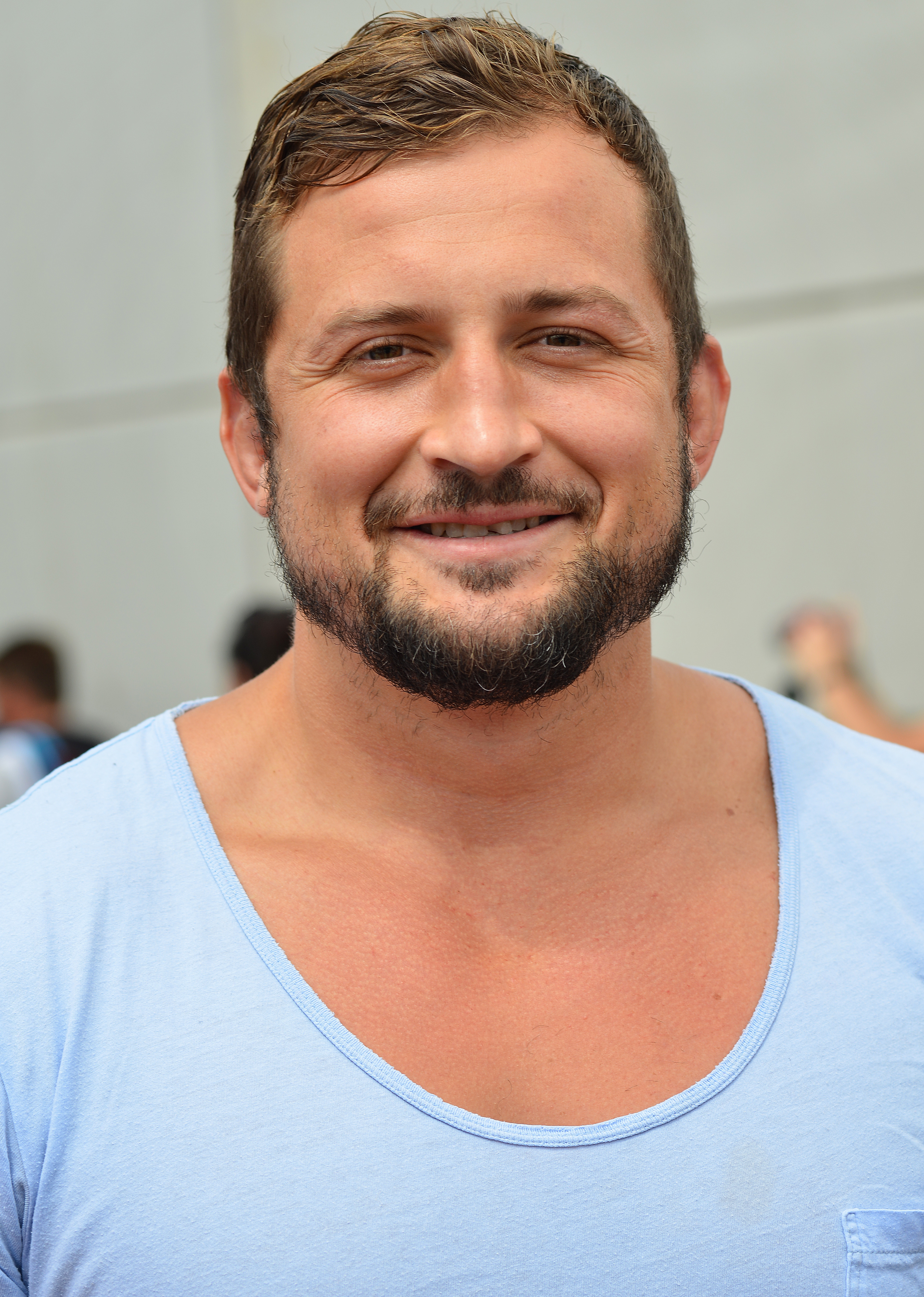
- Full name: Schalk Jakobus Petrus Ferreira
- Born: 9 February 1984 (age 42) Pretoria, South Africa
- Height: 1.88 m (6 ft 2 in)
- Weight: 115 kg (254 lb; 18 st 2 lb)
- School: Paul Roos Gymnasium, Stellenbosch

Rugby union career
- Position: Prop
- Current team: Cheetahs / Free State Cheetahs
Youth career
- 1999–2005: Western Province
Senior career
Years	Team	Apps	(Points)
2005–2009	Western Province	48	(10)
2007–2009	Stormers	16	(0)
2009	→ Boland Cavaliers	1	(0)
2012	Western Province	10	(0)
2012–2013	Eastern Province Kings	12	(5)
2013	Southern Kings	17	(10)
2013–2015	Toulouse	35	(5)
2015–2016	Eastern Province Kings	10	(0)
2016–2020	Southern Kings	60	(15)
2021–	Free State Cheetahs	9	(0)
2021–	Cheetahs		
- Correct as of 10 July 2022
International career
Years	Team	Apps	(Points)
2002	South Africa Schools		
2003	South Africa Under-19		
2004	South Africa Under-21	3	(0)
2014	World XV	1	(0)
- Correct as of 22 April 2018

Schalk Jakobus Petrus Ferreira (born 9 February 1984) is a South African rugby union player for the Southern Kings in the Pro14. He has been playing first rugby since 2005 and normally plays as a loosehead prop.

== Rugby career ==
=== Youth rugby ===
Ferreira was born in Pretoria, where he also attended primary school, before moving to the Western Cape, where he attended Stellenbosch-based high school Paul Roos Gymnasium. He was included in various Western Province representative teams during his school days, representing them at Under-16 level in 2000 and playing at the premier South African schools competition, the Under-18 Craven Week on two occasions – in 2001 for a Coastal Western Province combination side and in 2002 for Western Province. After the 2002, he was also included in a South African Schools squad that played matches against their French and Welsh counterparts.

In 2003, Ferreira was included in the South Africa Under-19 squad that played at the 2003 Under-19 Rugby World Championship held in Paris. He helped South Africa win the tournament, beating New Zealand's Under-19 team 22–18 in the final. He returned to South Africa to represent Western Province in the Under-20 Provincial Championship in the latter half of 2003.

Ferreira was included in the South Africa Under-21 squad that played in the Under-21 Rugby World Championship held in Scotland in 2004. and helped them to finish third in the competition, beating Australia Under-21 44–10 in the third-place play-off. He also continued to represent Western Province's Under-20s in the Provincial Championship in 2004.

=== Western Province / Stormers ===
In 2005, Ferreira was included in a domestic first class squad for the first time, being named in their squad for the 2005 Vodacom Cup. He made his debut in the competition by starting in their 11–35 defeat to the Blue Bulls in Pretoria in the opening round of the competition. In his fifth appearance for the side against Western Cape rivals SWD Eagles, Ferreira scored his first senior try in a 32–36 defeat in Cape Town. He eventually played in all seven of their matches in the competition, but could not help them secure a place in the semi-finals as they finished in third position in Section Y of the competition. He reverted to the Western Province U21 side for the second half of the year.

Ferreira made six starts and one appearance from the bench in the expanded 2006 Vodacom Cup as Western Province finished in seventh position in the fourteen-team competition. He was also included in their Currie Cup squad for the first time in 2006 and made his debut in the competition as a late replacement in their 25–18 opening round victory over the Pumas in Witbank. After two more appearances off the bench, he started his first match in the Currie Cup in Western Province's 40–31 win over the Falcons in Brakpan. His second Currie Cup start – in the return leg against the Falcons in Round 12 of the competition – saw him score his first ever Currie Cup try shortly before half-time in a 66–13 victory. He played in ten of their fourteen matches during the regular season – starting three of those – as Western Province finished third on the log to qualify for the play-offs. He again played off the bench in their semi-final match against the Blue Bulls, but could not help his side to victory, with the side from Pretoria winning the match 45–30.

In 2007, Ferreira was included in the Stormers' squad for the 2007 Super 14 season. He made his Super Rugby debut in Round Three of the competition, replacing Brok Harris in the second half of their match against New Zealand side the Chiefs in a 21–16 win in Cape Town. He appeared in nine of their remaining ten matches in the competition, which included the first Super Rugby start of his career – and only one of the season – in a 33–20 victory over another New Zealand side, the Blues, in Cape Town. The Stormers won just six out of their 13 matches in the competition to finish in tenth position on the log. He played in eight of Western Province's first nine matches in the 2007 Currie Cup Premier Division before a fractured rib ruled him out of the remainder of the season.

Ferreira suffered a neck injury in a car crash during the off-season prior to the 2008 Super 14 season which ruled him out of the start of the competition. Despite suggestions that Ferreira would be forced into retirement following the injury, he returned to action for the final four rounds of the competition, making two starts and two appearances as a replacement as the Stormers just missed out on a play-off spot, finishing in fifth position on the log. He appeared in a compulsory friendly match against an East Cape XV, helping Western Province to a 63–17 win before starting the first two matches of the Currie Cup Premier Division. He dropped behind Wicus Blaauw in the pecking order for the remainder of the competition, making eight appearances off the bench as Western Province finished in fifth position, missing out on the play-offs.

Ferreira made just two appearances from the bench for the Stormers during the 2009 Super 14 season and also played one match for Western Province in the 2009 Vodacom Cup. He featured in a compulsory friendly match prior to the 2009 Currie Cup Premier Division, in which he also made one appearance. The coaching staff at Western Province tried converting Ferreira into a hooker and he was loaned to Boland Cavaliers, where he started as a hooker in their 15–88 defeat to the Golden Lions in Johannesburg. However, he suffered further injury to the vertebrae in his neck and he announced his retirement from rugby at the end of the 2009 season.

=== Return to rugby ===
After completely missing the 2010 and 2011 seasons, Ferreira reversed his decision to retire and rejoined Western Province prior to the 2012 season. He played in all ten of their matches in the 2012 Vodacom Cup competition and helped them win the competition for the first time in their history, beating Griquas 20–18 in a final that Ferreira started.

=== Eastern Province Kings / Southern Kings ===
Ferreira joined Port Elizabeth-based side the Eastern Province Kings on a two-month trial during the 2012 Currie Cup First Division, which later turned into a permanent deal. After making his debut for the Eastern Province Kings in a match against a South African Students team, he made ten appearances for the Eastern Province Kings in the competition – starting all of those – as they topped the log to qualify for the title play-offs. Ferreira scored his first try for his new team in a 50–27 victory over the Leopards in the semi-final and also helped them to victory in the final, starting the match as they beat the Pumas 26–25 to win the title for the second time in their history. He missed out on the first leg of their promotion/relegation play-off series against the Free State Cheetahs, but returned for the second leg, but the EP Kings lost both matches to remain in the First Division.

In 2013, Ferreira was named in Southern Kings squad for their first season of Super Rugby. He started in their historic first ever match, helping them secure a 22–10 victory over Australian side the Force. He firmly established himself as their first-choice loosehead prop, starting in the Kings' first 15 matches in the competition. He scored his first ever Super Rugby try in Round Eight of the competition in a match that saw the Kings pick up their first points away from home in the competition in a 28–28 draw against eventual Australian Conference winners the Brumbies in Canberra. Ferreira also tasted victory in their matches against the Rebels a week later and against the Highlanders in their first ever bonus point victory, but it was not enough to prevent the new franchise from finishing bottom of the South African Conference, and in the process qualifying to a relegation play-off series against the Lions. He started their 19–26 defeat in the first leg and – despite scoring a try 12 minutes from the end of their second leg match which helped them to a 23–18 victory – could not prevent the Lions win the series by an aggregate score of 44–42, which resulted in the Kings losing their Super Rugby status for 2013.

=== Toulouse ===
Ferreira joined the exodus of players that left the Kings after they lost their Super Rugby relegation play-off series, moving to France to join Top 14 side Toulouse. He initially signed for the side as a medical joker following an injury to Vasil Kakovin, but was later rewarded with a three-year contract.

Ferreira appeared his first Top 14 match for Toulouse on 8 September 2013, starting in a 0–25 defeat to Montpellier in Round 5 of the competition. He appeared in 21 of Toulouse's remaining 22 matches in the round-robin stage of the competition, starting 11 of those matches. He helped Toulouse to finish in fourth spot on the log to secure a berth in the quarter finals, but didn't feature in their 16–21 defeat to Racing Métro in their quarter final match. He also featured for Toulouse during the 2013–14 Heineken Cup; he played in all Toulouse's matches in the pool stage of the competition, helping them finish top of Pool 3 with five wins in their six matches, and came on as a replacement in the quarter final, where they lost 23–47 to Irish side Munster.

During the off-season, Ferreira returned to South Africa as a member of a World XV that played against South Africa in a one-off match during the 2014 mid-year rugby union internationals. He appeared as a second-half replacement as South Africa won 47–13 in Cape Town.

Ferreira found himself down the pecking order for the 2014–2015 Top 14 season, making just seven appearances off the bench in a season that saw Toulouse finish in third position on the log and reaching the semi-final stage of the play-offs before losing to Clermont. Ferreira's final appearance for Toulouse came in their match against Brive in Round 24 of the competition. He played off the bench in the second half and scored a try a few minutes later, his first in a Toulouse shirt.

=== Return to Eastern Province Kings / Southern Kings ===
Ferreira was released from his contract with Toulouse a year early and he returned to Port Elizabeth, signing a contract with the Eastern Province Kings until the end of 2017. He started five matches and played off the bench in four matches during the 2015 Currie Cup Premier Division, helping them finish in seventh spot on the log.

At the end of 2015, severe financial problems at the Eastern Province Kings resulted in players' wages not being paid for several months and their affiliated Super Rugby franchise, the Southern Kings – due to return to Super Rugby in 2016 after a two-year absence – being taken over by the South African Rugby Union. Ferreira was one of 20 Eastern Province Kings players that secured a contract from SARU to represent the Kings in 2016.

== Statistics ==
First class career
Season	International			Main domestic			Other			Total	
Season	Team	Apps	Pts	Team	Apps	Pts	Team	Apps	Pts	Apps	Pts
2005	—			—			Western Province (VC)	7	5	7	5
2006	—			Western Province (CC)	11	5	Western Province (VC)	7	0	18	5
2007	Stormers (SR)	10	0	Western Province (CC)	8	0	Western Province (tbc)	1	0	19	0
2008	Stormers (SR)	4	0	Western Province (CC)	10	0	Western Province (fr)	1	0	15	0
2009	Stormers (SR)	2	0	Western Province (CC)	1	0	Western Province (fr)	1	0	6	0
2009	Stormers (SR)	2	0	Boland Cavaliers (CC)	1	0	Western Province (tbc)	1	0	6	0
2012	—			Eastern Province Kings (CC1 / CCPO)	11	5	Western Province (VC)	10	0	21	0
2012	—			Eastern Province Kings (CC1 / CCPO)	11	5	Eastern Province Kings (fr)	1	0	21	0
2013	Kings (SR)	15	5	—			Kings (SRPO)	2	5	17	10
2013–2014	Toulouse (HC)	7	0	Toulouse (T14)	21	0	—			28	0
2014–2015	—			Toulouse (T14)	7	5	—			7	5
2015	—			Eastern Province Kings (CC)	9	0	—			9	0
2016	Kings (SR)	2	0	—			—			2	0
2005–present	Updated 18 March 2016									149	30
Competition abbreviations: SR = Super Rugby, SRPO = Super Rugby promotion/relegation play-off, HC = Heineken Cup, CC = Currie Cup Premier Division, CCPO = Currie Cup promotion/relegation play-off, T14 = Top 14, CC1 = Currie Cup First Division, VC = Vodacom Cup, fr = friendly.
