= Christiaan de Bruin =

South African rugby union player (born 1993)

- Full name: Christiaan Pieter de Bruin
- Born: 20 January 1993 (age 33) Centurion, South Africa
- Height: 1.97 m (6 ft 5 1/2 in)
- Weight: 110 kg (17 st 5 lb; 243 lb)
- School: Hoërskool Waterkloof, Pretoria

Rugby union career
- Position: Flanker / Lock
Youth career
- 2006–2014: Blue Bulls
Amateur team(s)
| Years | Team | Apps | (Points) |
| 2014–2015 | UP Tuks | 0 | (0) |
| 2015 | College Rovers | 5 | (0) |
Senior career
| Years | Team | Apps | (Points) |
| 2013–2014 | Blue Bulls | 4 | (0) |
| 2015–2016 | Sharks XV | 10 | (0) |
| 2015 | Sharks (Currie Cup) | 3 | (0) |
| 2016–2017 | Eastern Province Kings | 9 | (0) |
- Correct as of 23 April 2018

Christiaan Pieter de Bruin (born 20 January 1993) is a South African rugby union player, who most recently played with the Eastern Province Kings in domestic rugby. His regular position is flanker but he can also play as a lock.

== Career ==
=== Youth / Blue Bulls ===
De Bruin represented the Blue Bulls at various levels while at school; in 2006, he played for their Under-13 side at the Craven Week tournament, in 2010, he played for them at the Under-18 Academy Week and in 2011, he played at the Under-18 Craven Week tournament.

After school, he joined the Blue Bulls Academy. He made six appearances for the Blue Bulls U19 side during the 2012 Under-19 Provincial Championship. He made four appearances during the regular season and scored a try in their 45–14 victory over Free State U19 in their final match as the Blue Bulls finished the season in second spot on the log. He started their 46–35 semi-final victory against the Sharks U19s and appeared as a replacement in the final, but could not help his team to a victory as Western Province U19 ran out 22–18 winners.

De Bruin was named in both the Blue Bulls squad for the 2013 Vodacom Cup and the Blue Bulls U21 squad for the 2013 Under-21 Provincial Championship, but failed to make appearances in either competition.

De Bruin returned to action in 2014, making his first class debut by starting the Blue Bulls' 24–26 defeat to Griquas in their first match in the 2014 Vodacom Cup. He also started their matches against the Pumas and the Griffons during the regular season to help the Blue Bulls finish in third spot in the Northern Section to qualify for the quarter-finals. He didn't feature in their 22–21 victory over a Free State XV in their quarter final, but he did start their semi-final match against trans-Jukskei rivals the Golden Lions, where a 15–16 defeat saw them eliminated from the competition. He featured for the Blue Bulls U21 during the 2014 Under-21 Provincial Championship, where he made five appearances and scored a try in their 143–0 demolition of Border U21. He didn't feature in the latter stages of the competition, which was eventually won by the Blue Bulls after they beat Western Province U21 20–10 in the final.

=== College Rovers / Sharks ===
In 2015, De Bruin moved to Durban to join KwaZulu-Natal club side College Rovers. He represented College Rovers during the 2015 SARU Community Cup competition, as they made it to the Plate Final where they lost to Pretoria Police, effectively finishing the competition in sixth place.

Shortly after the conclusion of this tournament, he became involved in first class rugby again, linking up with the Sharks XV squad that played in the 2015 Vodacom Cup competition. He made his debut for his side playing off the bench in their 18–35 defeat to the Free State XV. He also came on as a replacement in their narrow defeat to Griquas before starting his only match of the competition in an 8–23 defeat by the Eastern Province Kings, starting the match as a lock for the first time in his career.

De Bruin was then included in the Sharks squad for the 2015 Currie Cup Premier Division competition. He made his Currie Cup debut as a replacement in a 27–37 defeat to Western Province and made his first start a week later against the Blue Bulls.
