= Deon Davids =

- Full name: Deon Horace Davids
- Born: 11 February 1968 (age 58) Victoria West, South Africa
- Height: 1.88 m (6 ft 2 in)
- Weight: 102 kg (225 lb; 16 st 1 lb)
- School: Albert Myburgh Secondary School, Bredasdorp
- University: University of the Western Cape

Rugby union career
- Position: Number eight / Flanker / Lock
Senior career
Years	Team	Apps	(Points)
–	Boland		
- Correct as of 4 December 2015
- Correct as of 4 December 2015
Coaching career
- Years: Team
- 1998: Villagers Worcester
- 2002: Boland College
- 2002: Boland 'A'
- 2002: South Africa Students
- 2002–2006: Boland Cavaliers (assistant coach)
- 2005: African Leopards
- 2006–2007: Boland Cavaliers (Vodacom Cup)
- 2007–2009: Boland Cavaliers (head coach)
- 2008: Emerging Springboks (assistant coach)
- 2009: South Africa Under-20 (assistant coach)
- 2010–2011: UWC (head coach)
- 2011–2012: Golden Lions (Vodacom Cup)
- 2011–2012: Golden Lions (Under-21)
- 2012–2015: SWD Eagles (academy head coach)
- 2015: SWD Eagles (director of coaching)
- 2016–2019: Southern Kings
- 2016–2017: SWD Eagles (head coach)

Deon Horace Davids is an international award-winning high-performance rugby union coach. Born 11 February 1968 in Victoria West, South Africa, he grew up and completed his schooling in the Overberg town of Bredasdorp. Davids is an alumnus of the University of the Western Cape with a BA Honours in Human Movement Studies and a Higher Diploma in Education.

He is a South African rugby union coach, with more than 34 years' experience coaching at every level of the game from school to varsity, club, super rugby union and international test rugby union. He is currently Assistant Coach for the World Champion Springboks, fulfilling the technical role of Forwards Coach. Prior to this, he was the head coach of the Southern Kings Pro14 franchise before being selected as Assistant Springboks in 2020.

== Playing career ==
Taking his first steps into the world of sport as a youngster, Deon dabbled in multiple sports including Cricket, Tennis, Table Tennis and Athletics. Davids’ rugby playing career goes as far back as his primary school days where he played in different positions from wing to flank forward and eventually scrumhalf. Excelling in the position of scrumhalf, he earned a call up to participate in Boland Primary school trials.

Due to the political climate of the day, Davids missed out on playing rugby during High School. Upon enrolling as a student at UWC and taking up residence in the university hostels, Davids was earmarked as the Lock for the Hostel 2 rugby team for the orientation week because of his physical stature. He was then selected for the Human Movement studies First Year Team; this would lead to his introduction to UWC Club Rugby.

Davids played as a number eight, flanker or lock and spent the majority of his career playing in the Boland Super League, as well as playing for university side UWC.

He was selected for the UWC team that competed in the student week (SATISU) in Port Elizabeth in 1987 and was part of the team that won the 1998 Tygerberg League. He made the provincial teams of Boland after his university years. He also played for and captained the first teams of the Hamiltons and Villagers RFC in Worcester as well as the Rangers and Bredasdorp United Club that played in the South Western Districts League.

His playing career of more than 10 years ended in 2001 following a neck injury that on two occasions became a roadblock and ultimately prevented him from progressing to playing in the Currie Cup. He played his last game for Villagers Worcester, where he also took over as coach.

== Coaching career ==
As a coach, Deon Davids has developed a reputation for making a little go a long way, someone many would call a turnaround strategist. He has held numerous roles as Head Coach, Assistant Coach and Director of Rugby, having worked his way up from coaching at club level to provincial teams, the Emerging Springboks and SA U-20s.

In many of his roles he has had to work with little resources. He has coached so-called underdog teams to achieving major upset wins.

Davids' coaching career started at Söhnge Teachers Training College (where he lectured) and eventually Worcester Villagers Rugby Club. As Coach, Davids guided Worcester Villagers to the Boland Super League B title in 1998. He also guided Boland College to a title win in 2002 before he was appointed as the assistant coach to Hawies Fourie at provincial side Boland Cavaliers.

With Davids coaching the forwards, Boland Cavaliers won the Currie Cup First Division in 2003 and 2004 and the Vodacom Shield in 2004. When Fourie left to become the backline coach of the Stormers for the 2006 Super Rugby campaign, Davids took over as the head coach of the Vodacom Cup side, but remained as the assistant to Fourie and Director of Rugby Rudy Joubert in the Currie Cup competition. When Fourie permanently left to join the Free State Cheetahs coaching staff in 2007, Davids was appointed as the head coach of the Boland Cavaliers for the 2007 Currie Cup Premier Division, guiding them to seventh spot in the competition. His side reached the quarter-finals of the 2007 Vodacom Cup before Davids assisted Chester Williams in coaching the Emerging Springboks side to victory in the 2008 IRB Nations Cup competition held in Romania. Upon his return to South Africa, he once again helped Boland Cavaliers finish in seventh spot in the 2008 Currie Cup Premier Division.

He helped the Boland Cavaliers make another quarter final appearance in the 2008 Vodacom Cup, before he was appointed as the assistant to Eric Sauls for the South Africa Under-20 team that finished third at the 2008 IRB Junior World Championship. The Boland Cavaliers had a disappointing season in the 2009 Currie Cup Premier Division and the Boland Rugby Union decided to appoint Chester Williams as their Director of Rugby, effectively marginalising Davids, who had a contract with the union until 2012. Davids left Boland amidst threats of legal action and took over as head coach of university side UWC, as well as joining the youth selection committee of Western Province.

Davids coached UWC in the first ever Varsity Shield competition, helping them to finish in third spot in the 2011 competition, but left during the competition to join the Golden Lions, becoming head coach of their Vodacom Cup side for the 2012 season, as well as coaching the Under-21 side.

At the end of 2012, Davids returned to the Western Cape to join the George-based SWD Eagles as the head coach of their academy, and taking charge of the SWD U21 side. He remained in that role until 2015, when he also assisted the first team, coached by Bevin Fortuin. When Fortuin left to join the Blue Bulls at the end of the 2015 season, Davids was appointed as the head coach of the SWD Eagles on a three-year contract. Within a week of his appointment, the South African Rugby Union announced that Davids would coach the Port Elizabeth-based Southern Kings Super Rugby franchise in the 2016 Super Rugby season. He would coach them before returning to the SWD Eagles once the Super Rugby season was completed. After leading the Kings to their best finish in 2017, Davids was retained as Head Coach for the 2018/2019 season, tasked with rebuilding a team for their debut in the Guiness Pro14 Championship.

Davids was first spotted at Springbok training in 2019, after parting ways with the Kings by mutual agreement. This sparked rumours of him being in considered for the Springbok Head Coach position with many citing him as a strong contender due to his extensive Head Coach experience with many so-called underdog or minnow teams developing an attacking edge under his leadership.

Following the 2019 World Cup, SA Rugby confirmed that Davids would join the Springbok Coaching structure as Assistant Coach succeeding Matt Proudfoot as Forwards Coach.

Since his appointment, Davids has become an integral part of the Springbok Coaching Structure. His tenure with the Springboks coincides with an end to a nine-year dry spell for the Springboks, with accolades such as a 2021 series win over the British & Irish Lions, a 2023 World Cup Win as well as a 2024 Rugby Championship win forming part of a highly successful 2024 test season.
