= Cameron Lindsay (rugby union) =

South African rugby union player

- Born: 15 October 1991 (age 35) Pretoria, South Africa
- Height: 2.00 m (6 ft 6 1/2 in)
- Weight: 115 kg (254 lb; 18 st 2 lb)
- School: Michaelhouse, KwaZulu-Natal
- University: University of Stellenbosch / Nelson Mandela Metropolitan University

Rugby union career
- Position: Lock
- Current team: Rovigo Delta
Youth career
- 2009: Sharks
Amateur team(s)
Years	Team	Apps	(Points)
2012–2013	Maties		
2014	NMMU Madibaz	5	(0)
Senior career
Years	Team	Apps	(Points)
2014–2017	Eastern Province Kings	18	(5)
2017–2020	Pumas	31	(5)
2020–2022	Griquas	23	(5)
2022–2023	Rovigo Delta	22	(0)
- Correct as of 10 July 2022

Cameron Lindsay (born 15 October 1991) is a South African rugby union player for the Rovigo Delta in the Italian Top10. His regular position is lock.

== Career ==
=== Youth ===
Lindsay attended Michaelhouse school in KwaZulu-Natal and played for their Under-18 side at the 2009 Craven Week tournament. In 2010, he moved to Cape Town to join Western Province. He made twelve appearances for the Western Province U19 side that won the 2010 Under-19 Provincial Championship competition, although Lindsay was an unused substitute in the final.

In 2012, he was included in the Western Province U21 squad for the 2012 Under-21 Provincial Championship, but failed to play for them. He did however play some club rugby for university side Maties in the Western Province Super League in 2012. He was named in their squad for the 2013 Varsity Cup, but once again failed to make any appearances.

At the end of 2013, he joined Port Elizabeth-based side the Eastern Province Kings on trial and joined the university side affiliated with the Kings, the NMMU Madibaz for the 2014 Varsity Cup. He started five of their matches to help them to the semi-final of the competition.

=== Senior career ===
Lindsay's performances in the 2014 Varsity Cup also earned him an inclusion in the Eastern Province Kings squad for the 2014 Vodacom Cup competition. He was named in their starting line-up for their match against the SWD Eagles in George, making his first class debut in a 23–21 loss. He retained his spot in the starting line-up for their next match against Boland Cavaliers, where he scored his first senior try.

In June 2014, he was selected in the starting line-up for the Eastern Province Kings side to face Wales during a tour match during a 2014 incoming tour. He played the entire match as the Kings suffered a 12–34 defeat. In August 2022 he signed for the Rovigo Delta in the Italian Top10. He played for Rovigo for 2022−23 season.

=== International career ===
In May 2019 he was included in a preliminary 23-men squad for the Germany national team. His name was suggested to the German coach Mike Ford by another fellow South African coaching the German Sevens team, Vuyo Zangqa.

Lindsay has yet to make an appearance for the Springboks.
