= Southern Kings =

South African rugby union team, based in Port Elizabeth

(South Africa) Southern Kings
- Full name: Southern Kings
- Union: South African Rugby Union
- Founded: 2009
- Disbanded: 2020; 6 years ago
- Location: Port Elizabeth, South Africa
- Region: Eastern Cape
- Ground: Nelson Mandela Bay Stadium (Capacity: 48,459)
- Most caps: Schalk Ferreira (79)
- Top scorer: Demetri Catrakilis (194)
- Most tries: Yaw Penxe (15)
- League(s): Super Rugby; Pro14
Team kit	2nd kit

Official website
- kingsrugby.co.za

The Southern Kings were a South African professional rugby union team that competed in Super Rugby and Pro14. They were based in Port Elizabeth in the Eastern Cape province and played their home matches at Nelson Mandela Bay Stadium. They were created in 2009, and had their first match against the British & Irish Lions during their 2009 tour. After competing in Super Rugby in 2013, 2016 and 2017, they joined Pro14 prior to the 2017–18 season, along with the Cheetahs.

For the 2013 season, the Kings' catchment area was made up of the Eastern Cape and parts of the Western Cape, drawing players from 3 provincial unions: namely the Eastern Province Kings, based in Port Elizabeth (representing the southern half of the Eastern Cape), the Border Bulldogs, based in East London (representing the northern half of the Eastern Cape) and the SWD Eagles, based in George (representing the South Western Districts). However, after the South African Rugby Union took over the running of the franchise in November 2015, the franchise had no formal ties to any of the provincial unions.

The team was disbanded in September 2020 after going into voluntary liquidation.

== History ==
=== Southern Spears ===
In 2005, there was an attempt to bring a Super Rugby side to the Eastern Cape province in the form of the Southern Spears, who were intended to participate in the Super 14 from 2007 onwards; however, their proposed entry into the competition led to considerable controversy within the country's rugby establishment. In April 2006, after concerns over the team's financial stability and sporting competitiveness, the Spears were denied entry into the Super 14. Following this, the Southern Spears ceased to exist.

=== Formation and first fixtures ===
In January 2009, SARU announced that a new franchise in the Eastern Cape Province would be launched in June of that year to coincide with the arrival of the British & Irish Lions in Port Elizabeth for one of their midweek tour matches. The franchise was launched with the goal of a future place in Super Rugby, but no timetable was initially set. The President of the Eastern Province Rugby Union, Cheeky Watson, said "there is a desperate hunger for top-flight rugby in the South Eastern Cape and this is the first step to satisfying it." The franchise was officially announced in April 2009. They played their first match against the British & Irish Lions on 16 June 2009, losing 8–20 in a midweek match in Port Elizabeth. The team's first points were scored by Jaco van der Westhuyzen and their first try was scored by Mpho Mbiyozo.

They also played in the 2011 IRB Nations Cup, where they participated as the South African Kings. They won all three their games, beating Georgia, Romania and Portugal on their way to winning the competition.

=== Super Rugby inclusion ===
The unsponsored Southern Kings logo used from 2009 to 2018.

On 19 May 2009, Super Rugby governing body SANZAR announced that the existing Super 14 competition would be expanded to 15 teams from the 2011 season onwards. The expansion would participate in the Australian Conference, but was open to tenders from all territories, with teams from Australia, New Zealand and South Africa expressing an interest. This was eventually reduced to just two bidders, the Melbourne Rebels and the Southern Kings. On 11 November 2009, SANZAR arbitrators awarded the 15th licence to the Melbourne Rebels, with geographical location and commercial value swaying the decision in the Australian franchise's favour.

The South African Rugby Union were undeterred in their effort to bring Super Rugby to the Eastern Cape and on 27 January 2012, they confirmed that the Kings would participate in the 2013 Super Rugby season. Despite no initial decision as to how they will be accommodated in the competition, it was confirmed on 16 August 2012 that the Kings would take part at the expense of the Lions. They also announced that two-legged promotion/relegation play-off series would be played between the lowest-placed South African side in Super Rugby and the non-participating franchise every season.

=== 2013 : Super Rugby ===
The Kings made their Super Rugby debut on 23 February 2013, when they played in a Round Two match against Australian side the Force at the Nelson Mandela Bay Stadium. The Kings won the game 22–10, with Sergeal Petersen scoring two tries and Demetri Catrakilis contributing twelve points with the boot. They lost their next two home matches to the Sharks and the Chiefs before embarking on their tour of Australasia. They lost both their matches in New Zealand – against the Crusaders and Hurricanes respectively – but picked up log points in Australia; a try from flanker Cornell du Preez three minutes into injury time and subsequent conversion from Catrakilis helped them secure a 28–all draw against eventual Australian Conference winners the Brumbies in Canberra and they went one better the following week, beating the Rebels 30–27, with a late Wimpie van der Walt try helping them to the win. Upon their return to South Africa, they suffered three consecutive defeat, with the Bulls, Cheetahs and Waratahs all beating the Kings. The Kings beat the Highlanders 34–27 in their next match to secure their first ever bonus point victory, but lost their last five matches of the season, losing to the Cheetahs, and the Stormers before the international break, and to the Bulls, Stormers and Sharks when the season resumed.

The Kings' top try scorer in the competition was Wimpie van der Walt, who got six tries and their top points scorer was Demetri Catrakilis, who scored 151 points. However, despite three victories and a draw, the Kings finished bottom of the South African Conference and had to play a two-legged promotion/relegation play-off series against the Lions. The Lions beat the Kings 26–19 in Port Elizabeth in the first leg, but bounced back to emerge victorious in Johannesburg, with Scott van Breda scoring 18 points in a 23–18 victory. However, this was not enough to retain their Super Rugby status, as the Lions won 44–42 on aggregate to return them to Super Rugby in 2014 at the expense of the Kings.

=== 2014–2015 : Hiatus from Super Rugby ===
After the end of the 2013 Super Rugby season, the Kings lost several players to other teams. Director of Rugby Alan Solomons also left to join Edinburgh Rugby and head coach Matt Sexton later also announced that he was leaving the Kings to return to his home country New Zealand.

On 4 September 2013, SANZAR boss Greg Peters confirmed that South Africa would get a sixth Super Rugby franchise from 2016, as the competition expanded once again. This was reiterated in 2014 when SANZAR confirmed that the competition would expand to 18 teams, with teams from Argentina and Japan joining the competition.

Having lost the promotion/relegation play-off to the Lions, the Kings missed out on Super Rugby in 2014. They also agreed to sit out the 2015 season by withdrawing from the proposed promotion/relegation match at the end of 2014. In exchange, the Eastern Province Kings were guaranteed participation in the 2014 and 2015 Currie Cup competitions, intended to aid the team's preparation for a return to Super Rugby in 2016.

Their return to Super Rugby was beset by financial problems, with players' salaries being paid late in four consecutive months between August and November 2015. In November 2015, the South African Rugby Union took control of the Southern Kings franchise and revealed an operational plan on 4 December 2015; the plan included the appointment of SWD Eagles coach Deon Davids as the head coach for 2016, the identification of a fully transformed squad that they intended signing and a guarantee to pay the Southern Kings' staff and players.

=== 2016–2017 : Return to Super Rugby ===
The Kings made their return to Super Rugby on 27 February 2016, when they hosted the Sharks in Port Elizabeth. Despite a Chris Cloete try opening the scoring for the Kings, the visitors eventually won the match 43–8. They lost to New Zealand side the Chiefs at home despite a brace of tries by hooker Edgar Marutlulle, before embarking on a trip to New Zealand, where they also suffered defeats to the Crusaders and the Hurricanes. They returned to South Africa to face fellow newcomers, Japanese side the Sunwolves and got their first victory of the season, a 33–28 victory in which they scored four tries. The Kings then suffered six consecutive defeats, losing at home to fellow South African sides the Bulls and the Lions, away to Argentine side the Jaguares – a 27–73 defeat to set a new Kings record for most points conceded in a match, despite scoring four tries of their own – an 18–34 defeat at home to New Zealand side the Blues and two more defeats against South African sides the Cheetahs and the Sharks. The Kings returned to winning ways in their next match, beating the Jaguares 29–22 – also securing a bonus point by virtue out scoring four tries to one, but they were aided by two red cards for the visitors – before losing their last three matches of the season to the Highlanders, Lions and Stormers respectively. Chris Cloete, Edgar Marutlulle and captain Steven Sykes were the joint-top try scorers for the Kings with four tries apiece, while fly-half Louis Fouché was the top points scorer with 81. They finished bottom of the four teams in the Africa 2 Conference, seventh in the South African Group and 17th overall, with just the Japanese Sunwolves team finishing the season with a worse record.

The Kings started the 2017 Super Rugby season on a losing note, with a 26–39 defeat to the Jaguares in Port Elizabeth. They secured their first away win for four years in their next match, winning 37–23 against the Sunwolves in Singapore, but followed that up by three consecutive defeats on home soil, against the Stormers, Sharks and Lions respectively. They lost to the Force and Reds in their opening two matches of their Australian tour, but bounced back by beating the Waratahs 26–24 in Sydney. They secured their highest victory margin in their next match, winning 44–3 against the Rebels in Port Elizabeth, before securing their first ever victory over South African opposition, beating the Sharks 35–32. After losing to the Brumbies and the Lions in their next two matches, they secured 31–30 away wins to the Jaguares and the Bulls in their next two, before ending their campaign with a 20–21 defeat to the Cheetahs in Bloemfontein. Their record of six wins and nine losses saw them finish bottom of the Africa 2 Conference, fifth in the South African Group – ahead of local rivals the Bulls and Cheetahs – and 11th overall. Lionel Cronjé topped their scoring charts, finishing on 136 points for the season, the fourth-highest in the competition, while winger Makazole Mapimpi scored 11 tries, a new seasonal and all-time record for the Kings and the joint-third highest in the competition.

=== 2017–2020 : Pro14 and Isuzu sponsorship ===
In April 2017, SANZAAR announced that three clubs would be cut from Super Rugby for the 2018 Super Rugby season, with two of those teams coming from South Africa. A newly established SARU Franchise Committee was tasked with determining the two teams to drop out of Super Rugby, and on 7 July 2017, it was confirmed that the Cheetahs and Kings would not participate in the competition going forward, but would "explore alternative playing opportunities in other international competitions". On 1 August 2017, the European-based Pro12 announced that the competition would expand to 14 teams – being rebranded the Pro14 – and that the Cheetahs and Kings would be the teams joining the expanded tournament from the 2017–18 season onwards.

This announcement came too late to ensure squad continuity, with more than 30 players leaving the franchise. On 15 August 2017 – a fortnight before the competition started – the Kings announced that head coach Deon Davids extended his contract to lead the team in their Pro14 season, and also announced the first batch of player signings. With the team having just four training sessions and no pre-season matches going into the season, they suffered a 10–57 defeat to reigning champions Scarlets, before another loss to Irish side Connacht. They played their first Pro14 match on home soil the following week against Leinster, losing their third match in a row with the Irish side winning 31–10. After another home defeat to Italian side Zebre, the Kings embarked on another tour of Europe, but was again whitewashed, losing to the Dragons, Benetton and Glasgow Warriors. Their results showed a slight upturn upon their return to home soil; despite losing 36–43 defeat to Ulster, the Kings picked up their first log points of the season – one for a seven-point defeat and one for scoring at least four tries – and repeated their bonus point haul in their next match, a 30–34 defeat to Scarlets. The Southern Kings failed to kick on from the narrow defeats, and lost to Edinburgh home and away, before another two defeats in their double-header derby matches against the Cheetahs, losing 21–45 in Port Elizabeth and 24–45 in Bloemfontein. They started their three-match tour of the northern hemisphere with a 10–59 loss to Ulster and continued their winless run with a 12–26 loss to the Ospreys and a record 7–64 defeat to Leinster in Dublin. The Southern Kings started their run of five consecutive home matches to end the season in spectacular fashion, beating Welsh side the Dragons 45–13 to record their first ever win in the competition. It proved to be their only victory of the season, as they finished with a narrow four consecutive losses, going down 35–36 to Benetton, 22–39 to Munster, 12–45 loss to the Cardiff Blues and 20–29 in their final match against the Cheetahs.

In August 2018, car manufacturer Isuzu Motors South Africa announced a deal to sponsor the Southern Kings for the next three seasons, resulting in the team officially being rebranded as the Isuzu Southern Kings. In addition, Isuzu partnered with a consortium of black business people to purchase equity in the Southern Kings, making the team the first black-owned rugby franchise in South Africa. On the field, the Kings started with a 16–32 defeat to Zebre and a 22–27 defeat to the Dragons on their early-season European tour. They returned to Port Elizabeth to suffer a 7–28 defeat to Ulster, but bounced back in their next match, beating Scottish side Glasgow Warriors 38–28 at the Nelson Mandela Bay Stadium. The Kings though would only go onto win one further game that season, defeating Edinburgh 38–28 in January 2019, while they would also draw against the Dragons in April as they finished in last place in Conference B. In March 2019, it was confirmed that a 74 percent share of the team had been purchased by a group of private individuals, with the side coming under private ownership for the first time since 2015.

In June 2019, head coach Deon Davids departed the club, with Robbi Kempson taking over interim charge in August. The Kings remained in Conference B for the season, beginning the season with five defeats before beating the Ospreys in November. The Kings would then go onto lose a further 7 matches, remaining bottom of Conference B, when the COVID-19 pandemic brought about the suspension of the season.

=== 2020 : Financial troubles and insolvency ===
Following the COVID-19 pandemic and suspensions of competitions, the Kings were taken over in the interim by SA Rugby due to failure to meet financial commitments. This decision was made to ensure the club could continue to compete in future competitions once COVID-19 lockdown rules were eased. However, in August 2020, the board of the Kings suspended the team's playing activities for 2020 due to substantial debt the team had accrued and the costs of playing in a domestic competition organised by SA Rugby being too high. Following this, in September 2020, the team was placed into voluntary liquidation to secure the long term future of rugby in the Eastern Province due to debts of R55m (R45m of which was owed to SA Rugby) and with zero prospect for income in the remainder of the year and no further additional credit from SA Rugby.

== Records and statistics ==
=== Summary of performances ===
The Southern Kings full playing record in all competitions are:

Pro14
Season	Played	Won	Drawn	Lost	Pts For	Pts Ag	Pts Diff	Tries For	Tries Ag	Log Pts	Pos
2017–18	21	1	0	20	378	829	–451	48	119	11	7th
2018–19	21	2	1	18	385	735	–350	54	107	22	7th
2019–20	13	1	0	12	204	498	–294	23	75	7	7th

Super Rugby
Season	Played	Won	Drawn	Lost	Pts For	Pts Ag	Pts Diff	Tries For	Tries Ag	Log Pts	Pos
2013	16	3	1	12	298	564	–266	27	69	24	15th
2016	15	2	0	13	282	684	–402	34	95	9	17th
2017	15	6	0	9	391	470	–79	49	60	28	11th

Other First Class games
Competition	Played	Won	Drawn	Lost	Pts For	Pts Ag	Pts Diff	Tries For	Tries Ag	Log Pts	Result
2009 British & Irish Lions tour	1	0	0	1	8	20	–12	1	2	0	
2011 IRB Nations Cup	3	3	0	0	97	52	+45	10	5	13	Champions
2013 Super Rugby relegation play-off	2	1	0	1	42	44	–2	4	4	5	Relegated

== Former coaches ==
- 2013: Alan Solomons (Director of rugby) & Matt Sexton (Head coach)
- 2016–2018/19: Deon Davids
- 2019/20: Robbi Kempson

== See also ==
- Rugby union in South Africa
- Super Rugby
- Pro14
- Border Bulldogs
- Eastern Province Elephants
- SWD Eagles
