= 2019–20 Southern Kings season =

Southern Kings
- 2019–20 season
- Head coach: Robbi Kempson (interim)
- Captain: JC Astle
- Stadium: Nelson Mandela Bay Stadium
- Conference B: 7th
- Record: Played 13, Won 1, Lost 2
- Top try scorer: All: Erich Cronjé, Stefan Ungerer (5)
- Top points scorer: All: Demetri Catrakilis (43)

In the 2019–20 rugby union season, the Southern Kings participated in the 2019–20 Pro14 competition, their third appearance since joining the competition in 2017–18. They remained in Conference B of the competition, which in 2019–20 featured Irish sides Connacht and Munster, Italian side Benetton, Scottish side Edinburgh and Welsh sides Cardiff Blues and Scarlets.

== Personnel ==
=== Coaches and management ===
The Southern Kings coaching and management staff for the 2019–20 Pro14 season are:

2019–20 Southern Kings coaches and management
Role	Name
Interim head coach	Robbi Kempson
Assistant coach	Braam van Straaten
Assistant coach	Vuyo Zangqa
Coaching consultant	Swys de Bruin
Strength and conditioning coach	Chad Foong
Athletic performance coordinator	Sean O'Dea

=== Squad ===
The Southern Kings squad for the 2019–20 Pro14 is:

2019–20 Southern Kings squad
Player	Position/s	Date of birth (age)	Pro14		Kings	
Player	Position/s	Date of birth (age)	Apps	Pts	Apps	Pts
(South Africa) Josh Allderman	Scrum-half	17 January 1997 (aged 22)	–	–	–	–
(Cameroon) Christian Ambadiang	Wing	13 January 1999 (aged 20)	–	–	–	–
(South Africa) JC Astle	Lock	30 August 1990 (aged 29)	21	0	21	0
(South Africa) Lusanda Badiyana	Loose forward	1 September 1996 (aged 23)	4	0	4	0
(South Africa) Tango Balekile	Hooker	7 March 1996 (aged 23)	12	0	12	0
(South Africa) Masixole Banda	Fullback	11 June 1988 (aged 31)	36	155	36	155
(South Africa) Thembelani Bholi	Loose forward	18 January 1990 (aged 29)	–	–	–	–
(South Africa) Michael Botha	Fullback	28 May 1997 (aged 22)	4	5	4	5
(South Africa) Aaron Brody	Lock	28 December 1998 (aged 20)	–	–	–	–
(South Africa) Brandon Brown	Loose forward	16 November 1994 (aged 24)	8	0	8	0
(South Africa) Tienie Burger	Loose forward	1 November 1993 (aged 25)	30	10	30	10
(South Africa) Demetri Catrakilis	Fly-half	6 July 1989 (aged 30)	–	–	–	–
(South Africa) Erich Cronjé	Centre	1 January 1997 (aged 22)	–	–	–	–
(South Africa) Cameron Dawson	Prop	6 January 1999 (aged 20)	–	–	–	–
(South Africa) Rossouw de Klerk	Prop	21 August 1989 (aged 30)	29	5	15	0
(South Africa) Bobby de Wee	Loose forward	4 February 1994 (aged 25)	26	5	26	5
(South Africa) Schalk Ferreira	Prop	9 February 1984 (aged 35)	37	5	37	5
(South Africa) Aston Fortuin	Lock	16 April 1996 (aged 23)	–	–	–	–
(South Africa) Gareth Heidtmann	Hooker	7 October 1998 (aged 20)	–	–	–	–
(South Africa) Christopher Hollis	Centre	24 June 1998 (aged 21)	–	–	–	–
(South Africa) JT Jackson	Centre	10 July 1996 (aged 23)	–	–	–	–
(South Africa) Tertius Kruger	Centre	24 December 1989 (aged 29)	15	10	13	10
(South Africa) Ruaan Lerm	Loose forward	25 March 1992 (aged 27)	33	10	33	10
(South Africa) Andell Loubser	Fullback	3 March 1997 (aged 22)	–	–	–	–
(South Africa) Eddie Ludick	Centre	25 January 1999 (aged 20)	–	–	–	–
(South Africa) Siya Masuku	Fly-half	1 August 1996 (aged 23)	–	–	–	–
(South Africa) Lupumlo Mguca	Prop	25 April 1997 (aged 22)	11	5	11	5
(South Africa) Gavin Mills	Scrum-half	8 March 2000 (aged 19)	–	–	–	–
(South Africa) Howard Mnisi	Centre	13 July 1989 (aged 30)	–	–	–	–
(South Africa) Yaw Penxe	Wing	3 April 1997 (aged 22)	36	65	36	65
(South Africa) Bader Pretorius	Fly-half	16 May 1997 (aged 22)	9	18	9	18
(South Africa) Sarel Pretorius	Scrum-half	18 April 1984 (aged 35)	79	75	7	5
(South Africa) Ig Prinsloo	Prop	4 April 1997 (aged 22)	–	–	–	–
(South Africa) Juan Schoeman	Prop	18 September 1991 (aged 28)	–	–	–	–
(South Africa) Pieter Scholtz	Prop	20 March 1994 (aged 25)	17	0	17	0
(Ireland) Jerry Sexton	Lock	16 April 1996 (aged 23)	–	–	–	–
(South Africa) S'bura Sithole	Centre	14 June 1990 (aged 29)	7	0	7	0
(South Africa) Alulutho Tshakweni	Prop	26 September 1998 (aged 21)	11	0	11	0
(South Africa) Josiah Twum-Boafo	Wing	23 July 1997 (aged 22)	–	–	–	–
(South Africa) Stefan Ungerer	Scrum-half	23 November 1993 (aged 25)	13	15	13	15
(South Africa) Scott van Breda	Fly-half	12 December 1991 (aged 27)	–	–	–	–
(South Africa) Alandré van Rooyen	Hooker	23 August 1996 (aged 23)	23	5	23	5
(South Africa) CJ Velleman	Loose forward	24 February 1995 (aged 24)	10	5	10	5
(South Africa) Xandré Vos	Prop	30 September 1996 (aged 22)	2	0	2	0
(South Africa) Courtney Winnaar	Fullback	27 March 1997 (aged 22)	1	0	1	0
Note: Players' ages and statistics are correct as of 28 September 2019, the date of the opening round of the competition. Pro14 appearances only.

=== Player movements ===
Player movements between the 2018–19 Pro14 season and the end 2019–20 Pro14 season are as follows:

Southern Kings transfers 2018–19 — 2019–20
Pos	2018–19 squad	Out	In	2019–20 squad
PR	Rossouw de Klerk; Martin Dreyer; Schalk Ferreira; Justin Forwood; Lupumlo Mguca; NJ Oosthuizen (loan); Luvuyo Pupuma; Pieter Scholtz; De-Jay Terblanche (loan); Alulutho Tshakweni; Xandré Vos	(substituted off) Martin Dreyer (released); (substituted off) Justin Forwood (to (France) SA XV Charente); (substituted off) NJ Oosthuizen (returned to Griquas); (substituted off) Luvuyo Pupuma (to Eastern Province Elephants); (substituted off) De-Jay Terblanche (returned to Pumas)	(substituted on) Cameron Dawson (from Free State XV); (substituted on) Ig Prinsloo (from Naka Bulls); (substituted on) Juan Schoeman (on loan from Sharks)	Cameron Dawson; Rossouw de Klerk; Schalk Ferreira; Lupumlo Mguca; Ig Prinsloo; Juan Schoeman (loan); Pieter Scholtz; Alulutho Tshakweni; Xandré Vos
HK	Tango Balekile; Alandré van Rooyen; Kerron van Vuuren (loan); Mike Willemse	(substituted off) Kerron van Vuuren (returned to Sharks); (substituted off) Mike Willemse (to (Scotland) Edinburgh)	(substituted on) Jacques du Toit (from Cheetahs); (substituted on) Gareth Heidtmann (from Blue Bulls U21)	Tango Balekile; Jacques du Toit; Gareth Heidtmann; Alandré van Rooyen
LK	JC Astle; Stephan Greeff; Giant Mtyanda; Schalk Oelofse; Dries van Schalkwyk; Jurie van Vuuren	(substituted off) Stephan Greeff (released); (substituted off) Giant Mtyanda (to Eastern Province Elephants); (substituted off) Schalk Oelofse (released); (substituted off) Dries van Schalkwyk (released); (substituted off) Jurie van Vuuren (to Utah )	(substituted on) Aaron Brody (from Blue Bulls U21); (substituted on) Aston Fortuin (from Blue Bulls XV); (substituted on) Elrigh Louw (from Free State U21); (substituted on) Jerry Sexton (from Jersey Reds)	JC Astle; Aaron Brody; Aston Fortuin; Elrigh Louw; Jerry Sexton
FL	Brandon Brown; Tienie Burger; Bobby de Wee; Stephan de Wit; Andisa Ntsila; CJ Velleman	(substituted off) Stephan de Wit (to Eastern Province Elephants); (substituted off) Andisa Ntsila (to Sharks)	(substituted on) Lusanda Badiyana (unattached); (substituted on) Thembelani Bholi (from Bulls)	Lusanda Badiyana; Thembelani Bholi; Brandon Brown; Tienie Burger; Bobby de Wee; CJ Velleman
N8	Ruaan Lerm			Ruaan Lerm
SH	Godlen Masimla; Sarel Pretorius; Stefan Ungerer; Ruan van Rensburg; Rudi van Rooyen	(substituted off) Godlen Masimla (to Western Province); (substituted off) Ruan van Rensburg (released); (substituted off) Rudi van Rooyen (to (Russia) Lokomotiv)	(substituted on) Josh Allderman (from Blue Bulls U21); (substituted on) Gavin Mills (from Hoër Landbouskool Boland)	Josh Allderman; Gavin Mills; Sarel Pretorius; Stefan Ungerer
FH	Martin du Toit; Ntabeni Dukisa; Bader Pretorius; Oliver Zono (did not play)	(substituted off) Martin du Toit (to Eastern Province Elephants); (substituted off) Ntabeni Dukisa (to Eastern Province Elephants); (substituted off) Oliver Zono (to Eastern Province Elephants)	(substituted on) Demetri Catrakilis (from (England) Harlequins); (substituted on) Siya Masuku (from Leopards); (substituted on) Scott van Breda (on loan from (England) Worcester Warriors)	Demetri Catrakilis; Siya Masuku; Bader Pretorius; Scott van Breda (loan)
CE	Tristan Blewett (loan); Berton Klaasen; Harlon Klaasen; Tertius Kruger; Meli Rokoua; S'bura Sithole	(substituted off) Tristan Blewett (to (United States) New Orleans Gold); (substituted off) Berton Klaasen (Griquas); (substituted off) Harlon Klaasen (Griquas); (substituted off) Meli Rokoua (to Eastern Province Elephants)	(substituted on) Erich Cronjé (from Blue Bulls U21); (substituted on) Christopher Hollis (from NMMU Madibaz); (substituted on) JT Jackson (from Bulls); (substituted on) Eddie Ludick (from Golden Lions U21); (substituted on) Howard Mnisi (from Golden Lions)	Erich Cronjé; Christopher Hollis; JT Jackson; Tertius Kruger; Eddie Ludick; Howard Mnisi; S'bura Sithole
WG	Bjorn Basson; Michael Makase; Yaw Penxe	(substituted off) Bjorn Basson (to Griquas); (substituted off) Michael Makase (released)	(substituted on) Christian Ambadiang (from Naka Bulls); (substituted on) Josiah Twum-Boafo (from NMMU Madibaz)	Christian Ambadiang; Yaw Penxe; Josiah Twum-Boafo
FB	Masixole Banda; Ulrich Beyers; Michael Botha; Courtney Winnaar	(substituted off) Ulrich Beyers (released)	(substituted on) Andell Loubser (from Blue Bulls U21)	Masixole Banda; Michael Botha; Andell Loubser; Courtney Winnaar
Coach	Deon Davids	(substituted off) Deon Davids (released)	(substituted on) Robbi Kempson (from Director of High Performance)	Robbi Kempson (interim)

During the season Chad Solomon joined the Kings on loan from the Stormers, De-Jay Terblanche rejoined the Kings on loan from the Pumas and Theo Maree joined from the Blue Bulls in November, Luyolo Dapula joined from the Free State XV and Robin Stevens joined from the Eastern Province Elephants in February, while Tiaan Botes was promoted from the Kings Academy in March.

Ahead of the resumption of the competition in August, the Kings announced an updated squad, with the additions of Nsuku Baloyi, Tharquinn Manuel, Tiaan Swanepoel, Gideon van Niekerk and Cameron Wright. Departing the team were JC Astle, Masixole Banda, Michael Botha, Brandon Brown, Demetri Catrakilis, Rossouw de Klerk, Schalk Ferreira, Tertius Kruger, Theo Maree, Siya Masuku, Lupumlo Mguca, Howard Mnisi, Sarel Pretorius, Robin Stevens, Stefan Ungerer and Xandré Vos who all left the team in this 5 month off period, while Juan Schoeman, Chad Solomon, De-Jay Terblanche and Scott van Breda returned to their parent clubs. However, due to the Kings entering voluntary liquidation in September, the team did not complete the season.

== Standings ==
The final Conference B log standings were:

2019–20 Pro14 Conference B
Pos	Team	P	W	D	L	PF	PA	PD	TF	TA	TB	LB	Pts
1	(Scotland) Edinburgh	15	11	0	4	391	225	+166	47	27	5	2	51
2	(Ireland) Munster	15	10	0	5	426	255	+171	53	26	8	3	51
3	(Wales) Scarlets	15	10	0	5	354	274	+80	46	34	5	2	47
4	(Ireland) Connacht	15	8	0	7	302	360	−58	41	48	7	1	40
5	(Italy) Benetton	15	6	1	8	309	350	−41	35	42	5	5	36
6	(Wales) Cardiff Blues	15	7	0	8	283	327	−44	30	38	3	2	33
7	(South Africa) Southern Kings	13	1	0	12	204	498	−294	23	75	0	3	7

=== Round-by-round ===
The table below shows the Southern Kings' progression throughout the season. For each round, their cumulative points total is shown with the conference position:

Team	R1	R2	R3	R4	R5	R6	R7	R8	R9	R10	R11	R12	R13	R14	R15	R16	R17	R18	R19	R20	R21	QF	SF	Final
Opposition	CAR	MUN	ULS	BEN	GLA	OSP	CON	EDI	CHE	CHE	MUN	SCA	CON	EDI	LEI	SCA	ZEB	CAR	BEN	DRA	CHE	—N/a	—N/a	—N/a
Cumulative Points	1	1	1	2	2	6	6	6	7	7	7	7	7	7	7	7	7	7	7	7	7	—N/a	—N/a	—N/a
Position	5th	6th	7th	7th	7th	7th	7th	7th	7th	7th	7th	7th	7th	7th	7th	7th	7th	7th	7th	7th	7th	—N/a	—N/a	—N/a
Key:	win	draw	loss	bye																				

== Matches ==
The fixtures for the 2019–20 Pro14 were:

28 September 2019	Southern Kings	27–31	Cardiff Blues	Nelson Mandela Bay Stadium, Port Elizabeth
15:00	Try: Tienie Burger; Stefan Ungerer (2); Con: Demetri Catrakilis (3); Pen: Demetri Catrakilis (2)	Scoreboard	Try: Liam Belcher; Olly Robinson; Harri Millard; Matthew Morgan; Kristian Dacey; Con: Jarrod Evans (3)	Referee: Mike Adamson

5 October 2019	Southern Kings	20–31	Munster	Nelson Mandela Bay Stadium, Port Elizabeth
15:00	Try: Stefan Ungerer; Elrigh Louw; Con: Demetri Catrakilis (2); Pen: Demetri Catrakilis (2)	Scoreboard	Try: Fineen Wycherley; Arno Botha; Alby Mathewson; Mike Haley; Con: JJ Hanrahan (4); Pen: JJ Hanrahan	Referee: Dan Jones

12 October 2019	Southern Kings	17–42	Ulster	Nelson Mandela Bay Stadium, Port Elizabeth
15:00	Try: Aston Fortuin; Tertius Kruger; Con: Demetri Catrakilis; JT Jackson; Pen: Demetri Catrakilis	Scoreboard	Try: Rob Herring; Sean Reidy; John Cooney (2); Luke Marshall; Matt Faddes; Con: John Cooney (6)	Referee: Craig Evans

26 October 2019	Benetton	36–30	Southern Kings	Stadio Comunale di Monigo, Treviso
16:00	Try: Ian Keatley; Angelo Esposito; Ignacio Brex; Iliesa Ratuva Tavuyara; Federico Ruzza; Con: Ian Keatley (3); Antonio Rizzi; Pen: Ian Keatley	Scoreboard	Try: Bobby de Wee; Christopher Hollis; Rossouw de Klerk; Con: Siya Masuku (3); Pen: Demetri Catrakilis (3)	Referee: Dan Jones

1 November 2019	Glasgow Warriors	50–0	Southern Kings	Scotstoun Stadium, Glasgow
21:35	Try: Oli Kebble; Grant Stewart; Zander Fagerson; Callum Gibbins; Matt Fagerson; Nikola Matawalu; Ratu Tagive penalty try Con: Adam Hastings (4)	Scoreboard		Referee: Joy Neville

9 November 2019	Ospreys	14–16	Southern Kings	Liberty Stadium, Swansea
15:00	Try: Morgan Morris; Hanno Dirksen; Con: James Hook; Luke Price	Scoreboard	Try: Erich Cronjé; Con: Scott van Breda; Pen: Scott van Breda (3)	Referee: Andrea Piardi

30 November 2019	Connacht	24–12	Southern Kings	Galway Sportsgrounds, Galway
17:15	Try: Bundee Aki; Finlay Bealham; John Porch (2); Con: Conor Fitzgerald (2)	Scoreboard	Try: Erich Cronjé; Scott van Breda; Con: Scott van Breda	Referee: Ben Whitehouse

4 January 2020	Edinburgh	61–13	Southern Kings	BT Murrayfield, Edinburgh
19:45	Try: Mike Willemse; Duhan van der Merwe; Matt Scott; James Johnstone; Penalty try Eroni Sau; Dave Cherry; Charlie Shiel; Mark Bennett; Con: Jaco van der Walt (7)	Scoreboard	Try: Erich Cronjé; JT Jackson; Pen: JT Jackson	Referee: Joy Neville

25 January 2020	Southern Kings	30–31	Cheetahs	Nelson Mandela Bay Stadium, Port Elizabeth
	Try: Bader Pretorius; Stefan Ungerer; JT Jackson; Con: Bader Pretorius (3); Pen: Bader Pretorius (3)	Scoreboard	Try: Sintu Manjezi (2); Wilmar Arnoldi; Rhyno Smith (2); Con: Tian Schoeman; Ruan Pienaar (2)	Referee: Stuart Berry

1 February 2020	Cheetahs	45–0	Southern Kings	Toyota Stadium, Bloemfontein
	Try: Joseph Dweba (2); Chris Massyn; Jasper Wiese; Clayton Blommetjies; Rhyno Smith; Louis Fouché; Con: Ruan Pienaar (2); Tian Schoeman; Louis Fouché (2)	Scoreboard		Referee: Divan Uys

14 February 2020	Munster	68–3	Southern Kings	Irish Independent Park, Cork
19:35	Try: Arno Botha (3); Calvin Nash; Jack O'Donoghue; John Hodnett; James Cronin; Shane Daly (2); Dan Goggin; Con: JJ Hanrahan (9)	Scoreboard	Pen: Demetri Catrakilis	Referee: Nika Amashukeli

23 February 2020	Scarlets	36–17	Southern Kings	Parc y Scarlets, Llanelli
17:15	Try: Tevita Ratuva; Ed Kennedy; Ryan Conbeer; Uzair Cassiem; Dan Davis; Tom Rogers; Con: Dan Jones (3)	Scoreboard	Try: Howard Mnisi; Christopher Hollis; Con: Demetri Catrakilis (2); Pen: Courtney Winnaar	Referee: Andrew Brace

1 March 2020	Southern Kings	19–29	Connacht	Nelson Mandela Bay Stadium, Port Elizabeth
15:00	Try: Stefan Ungerer; Erich Cronjé (2); Con: Siya Masuku (2)	Scoreboard	Try: Colby Fainga'a; Tiernan O'Halloran; Jack Carty; Penalty try Con: Jack Carty (2); Pen: Jack Carty	Referee: Cwengile Jadezweni

Following round 13 the league was suspended until 22 August due to the COVID-19 pandemic, with the Kings having entered voluntary liquidation before completing their fixtures.

== Player statistics ==
The Pro14 appearance record for players that represented the Southern Kings in 2019–20 is as follows:

2019–20 Southern Kings player statistics
Player name	CAR	MUN	ULS	BEN	GLA	OSP	CON	EDI	CHE	CHE	MUN	SCA	CON	EDI	LEI	SCA	ZEB	CAR	BEN	DRA	CHE	App	Try	Con	Pen	DG	Pts
Alulutho Tshakweni	1	17 (substituted on)	17 (substituted on)											—N/a	—N/a	—N/a	—N/a	—N/a	—N/a	—N/a	—N/a	3	0	0	0	0	0
Alandré van Rooyen	2	2	2	16 (substituted on)	16 (substituted on)	16 (substituted on)		16 (substituted on)	16 (substituted on)	16 (substituted on)	16 (substituted on)	16 (substituted on)	2	—N/a	—N/a	—N/a	—N/a	—N/a	—N/a	—N/a	—N/a	12	0	0	0	0	0
Pieter Scholtz	3	3	18 (substituted on)	3	3	3	3	3				18 (substituted on)	18 (substituted on)	—N/a	—N/a	—N/a	—N/a	—N/a	—N/a	—N/a	—N/a	10	0	0	0	0	0
Jerry Sexton	4	4	4		19 (substituted on)	4	4	4	4	4	4	4	4	—N/a	—N/a	—N/a	—N/a	—N/a	—N/a	—N/a	—N/a	12	0	0	0	0	0
JC Astle	5		19 (substituted on)	19 (substituted on)				19 (substituted on)		5	5	5	5	—N/a	—N/a	—N/a	—N/a	—N/a	—N/a	—N/a	—N/a	8	0	0	0	0	0
Tienie Burger	6	7	7	7	6	6	6							—N/a	—N/a	—N/a	—N/a	—N/a	—N/a	—N/a	—N/a	7	1	0	0	0	5
Bobby de Wee	7	19 (substituted on)	20 (substituted on)	4	4	5	19 (substituted on)	20 (substituted on)	19 (substituted on)	19 (substituted on)	7	20 (substituted on)	19 (substituted on)	—N/a	—N/a	—N/a	—N/a	—N/a	—N/a	—N/a	—N/a	13	1	0	0	0	5
Lusanda Badiyana	8	6	6	6					20 (substituted on)	20 (substituted on)	6	6	6	—N/a	—N/a	—N/a	—N/a	—N/a	—N/a	—N/a	—N/a	9	0	0	0	0	0
Stefan Ungerer	9	9	9				9	9	9		9	9	9	—N/a	—N/a	—N/a	—N/a	—N/a	—N/a	—N/a	—N/a	8	5	0	0	0	25
Demetri Catrakilis	10	10	10	10						22 (substituted on)	10	10		—N/a	—N/a	—N/a	—N/a	—N/a	—N/a	—N/a	—N/a	7	0	8	9	0	43
Yaw Penxe	11						11	14	14	14				—N/a	—N/a	—N/a	—N/a	—N/a	—N/a	—N/a	—N/a	5	0	0	0	0	0
JT Jackson	12	12	12		10	10	10	10	12	12				—N/a	—N/a	—N/a	—N/a	—N/a	—N/a	—N/a	—N/a	9	2	1	1	0	15
Howard Mnisi	13					12	12	12		23 (substituted on)		12	12	—N/a	—N/a	—N/a	—N/a	—N/a	—N/a	—N/a	—N/a	7	1	0	0	0	5
Christopher Hollis	14			14	14	14	14				14	14	14	—N/a	—N/a	—N/a	—N/a	—N/a	—N/a	—N/a	—N/a	8	2	0	0	0	10
Andell Loubser	15	14						23 (substituted on)	23 (substituted on)	15	15			—N/a	—N/a	—N/a	—N/a	—N/a	—N/a	—N/a	—N/a	6	0	0	0	0	0
Jacques du Toit	16 (substituted on)	16 (substituted on)	16 (substituted on)	2	2	2	2	2	2	2	2	2		—N/a	—N/a	—N/a	—N/a	—N/a	—N/a	—N/a	—N/a	12	0	0	0	0	0
Xandré Vos	17 (substituted on)			17 (substituted on)	17 (substituted on)	17 (substituted on)	17 (substituted on)	17 (substituted on)	17 (substituted on)		17 (substituted on)	17 (substituted on)	17 (substituted on)	—N/a	—N/a	—N/a	—N/a	—N/a	—N/a	—N/a	—N/a	10	0	0	0	0	0
Rossouw de Klerk	18 (substituted on)	18 (substituted on)	3	18 (substituted on)	18 (substituted on)				3	3	3	3	3	—N/a	—N/a	—N/a	—N/a	—N/a	—N/a	—N/a	—N/a	10	1	0	0	0	5
Aston Fortuin	19 (substituted on)	5	5	5	5	19 (substituted on)	5	5	5		19 (substituted on)	19 (substituted on)		—N/a	—N/a	—N/a	—N/a	—N/a	—N/a	—N/a	—N/a	11	1	0	0	0	5
Elrigh Louw	20 (substituted on)	20 (substituted on)	23 (substituted on)	21 (substituted on)	20 (substituted on)	8	8	8	8	8		8	8	—N/a	—N/a	—N/a	—N/a	—N/a	—N/a	—N/a	—N/a	11	1	0	0	0	5
Josh Allderman	21	21 (substituted on)	21 (substituted on)	9	9	9				21 (substituted on)	22 (substituted on)	22 (substituted on)		—N/a	—N/a	—N/a	—N/a	—N/a	—N/a	—N/a	—N/a	8	0	0	0	0	0
Bader Pretorius	22 (substituted on)							22 (substituted on)	10	10				—N/a	—N/a	—N/a	—N/a	—N/a	—N/a	—N/a	—N/a	4	1	3	3	0	20
S'bura Sithole	23 (substituted on)	22	22 (substituted on)	13	11	23	23 (substituted on)	13	13	13	13	13	13	—N/a	—N/a	—N/a	—N/a	—N/a	—N/a	—N/a	—N/a	11	0	0	0	0	0
Juan Schoeman		1	1	1	1	1	1							—N/a	—N/a	—N/a	—N/a	—N/a	—N/a	—N/a	—N/a	6	0	0	0	0	0
Ruaan Lerm		8	8	8	8	20 (substituted on)	20 (substituted on)	6	6	6	8	7	20 (substituted on)	—N/a	—N/a	—N/a	—N/a	—N/a	—N/a	—N/a	—N/a	12	0	0	0	0	0
Courtney Winnaar		11	11					15	22 (substituted on)		23 (substituted on)	15		—N/a	—N/a	—N/a	—N/a	—N/a	—N/a	—N/a	—N/a	6	0	0	1	0	3
Tertius Kruger		13	13	12	12									—N/a	—N/a	—N/a	—N/a	—N/a	—N/a	—N/a	—N/a	3	1	0	0	0	5
Masixole Banda		15	15	15	15				15				15	—N/a	—N/a	—N/a	—N/a	—N/a	—N/a	—N/a	—N/a	6	0	0	0	0	0
Josiah Twum-Boafo		23 (substituted on)	14	11		11							23 (substituted on)	—N/a	—N/a	—N/a	—N/a	—N/a	—N/a	—N/a	—N/a	5	0	0	0	0	0
Thembelani Bholi				20 (substituted on)	7	7	7	7	7	7	20 (substituted on)	21 (substituted on)	7	—N/a	—N/a	—N/a	—N/a	—N/a	—N/a	—N/a	—N/a	10	0	0	0	0	0
Siya Masuku				22 (substituted on)	22 (substituted on)	22	22 (substituted on)						10	—N/a	—N/a	—N/a	—N/a	—N/a	—N/a	—N/a	—N/a	4	0	5	0	0	10
Erich Cronjé				23 (substituted on)	13	13	13	11	11	11	12	11	11	—N/a	—N/a	—N/a	—N/a	—N/a	—N/a	—N/a	—N/a	10	5	0	0	0	25
Gavin Mills					21 (substituted on)									—N/a	—N/a	—N/a	—N/a	—N/a	—N/a	—N/a	—N/a	1	0	0	0	0	0
Scott van Breda					23 (substituted on)	15	15							—N/a	—N/a	—N/a	—N/a	—N/a	—N/a	—N/a	—N/a	3	1	2	3	0	18
Lupumlo Mguca						18 (substituted on)								—N/a	—N/a	—N/a	—N/a	—N/a	—N/a	—N/a	—N/a	1	0	0	0	0	0
Sarel Pretorius						21 (substituted on)								—N/a	—N/a	—N/a	—N/a	—N/a	—N/a	—N/a	—N/a	1	0	0	0	0	0
Chad Solomon							16 (substituted on)							—N/a	—N/a	—N/a	—N/a	—N/a	—N/a	—N/a	—N/a	1	0	0	0	0	0
De-Jay Terblanche							18 (substituted on)	18 (substituted on)						—N/a	—N/a	—N/a	—N/a	—N/a	—N/a	—N/a	—N/a	2	0	0	0	0	0
Theo Maree							21 (substituted on)	21 (substituted on)	21 (substituted on)	9			21 (substituted on)	—N/a	—N/a	—N/a	—N/a	—N/a	—N/a	—N/a	—N/a	5	0	0	0	0	0
Schalk Ferreira								1	1	17 (substituted on)	1	1	1	—N/a	—N/a	—N/a	—N/a	—N/a	—N/a	—N/a	—N/a	6	0	0	0	0	0
Ig Prinsloo									18 (substituted on)	18 (substituted on)	18 (substituted on)			—N/a	—N/a	—N/a	—N/a	—N/a	—N/a	—N/a	—N/a	3	0	0	0	0	0
Cameron Dawson										1				—N/a	—N/a	—N/a	—N/a	—N/a	—N/a	—N/a	—N/a	1	0	0	0	0	0
Eddie Ludick											11	23 (substituted on)		—N/a	—N/a	—N/a	—N/a	—N/a	—N/a	—N/a	—N/a	2	0	0	0	0	0
Luyolo Dapula											21 (substituted on)			—N/a	—N/a	—N/a	—N/a	—N/a	—N/a	—N/a	—N/a	1	0	0	0	0	0
Robin Stevens													16 (substituted on)	—N/a	—N/a	—N/a	—N/a	—N/a	—N/a	—N/a	—N/a	1	0	0	0	0	0
Tiaan Botes													22 (substituted on)	—N/a	—N/a	—N/a	—N/a	—N/a	—N/a	—N/a	—N/a	1	0	0	0	0	0
Total																						13	23	19	17	0	204
(c) denotes the team captain. For each match, the player's squad number is shown. Starting players are numbered 1 to 15, while the replacements are numbered 16 to 23. If a replacement made an appearance in the match, it is indicated by (substituted on) . "App" refers to the number of appearances made by the player, "Try" to the number of tries scored by the player, "Con" to the number of conversions kicked, "Pen" to the number of penalties kicked, "DG" to the number of drop goals kicked and "Pts" refer to the total number of points scored by the player. Christian Ambadiang, Tango Balekile, Nsuku Baloyi, Michael Botha, Aaron Brody, Brandon Brown, Gareth Heidtmann, Tharquinn Manuel, Tiaan Swanepoel, Gideon van Niekerk, CJ Velleman and Cameron Wright were named in the squad for the season, but never included in a matchday squad.

== See also ==
- Southern Kings
- Pro14
