= List of Southern Kings players =

The Southern Kings were a South African franchise that participated in Super Rugby in 2013, 2016 and 2017 and in the Pro14 from 2017–18 until the teams disbandment in 2020.

Below is a listing of all players that represented the Southern Kings.

== Super Rugby players ==
The following 106 players represented the Southern Kings at Super Rugby level in 2013, 2016 and 2017:

List of Southern Kings Super Rugby players
Cap no	Name	Position/s	Period	Apps	Pts	Try	Con	Pen	DG
66	Justin Ackerman	Prop	2016	8	0	0	0	0	0
23	Daniel Adongo	Lock	2013	5	0	0	0	0	0
60	Jacobie Adriaanse	Prop	2016	12	0	0	0	0	0
58	Louis Albertse	Prop	2016	2	0	0	0	0	0
68	Lukhanyo Am	Centre / Winger	2016	10	5	1	0	0	0
44	JC Astle	Lock	2016	15	0	0	0	0	0
89	Masixole Banda	Utility back	2017	11	15	3	0	0	0
26	Rynier Bernardo	Lock	2013	10	0	0	0	0	0
64	Martin Bezuidenhout	Hooker	2016–2017	18	5	1	0	0	0
46	Thembelani Bholi	Flanker	2016–2017	16	5	1	0	0	0
98	Alshaun Bock	Winger	2017	5	10	2	0	0	0
86	Chrysander Botha	Fullback	2017	2	0	0	0	0	0
43	Tom Botha	Prop	2016	15	0	0	0	0	0
4	David Bulbring	Lock	2013	16	0	0	0	0	0
3	Kevin Buys	Prop	2013	15	0	0	0	0	0
10	Demetri Catrakilis	Fly-half	2013	14	142	0	14	37	1
45	Chris Cloete	Flanker	2016–2017	23	30	6	0	0	0
13	Ronnie Cooke	Utility back	2013	15	10	2	0	0	0
83	Lionel Cronjé	Fly-half	2017	14	136	2	30	20	2
40	Aidon Davis	Loose-forward	2013, 2016	10	0	0	0	0	0
92	Pieter-Steyn de Wet	Fly-half	2017	10	26	2	5	2	0
38	Charl du Plessis	Prop	2013	2	0	0	0	0	0
50	JP du Plessis	Centre	2016	8	5	1	0	0	0
8	Cornell du Preez	Loose-forward	2013	14	15	3	0	0	0
104	Ntabeni Dukisa	Utility back	2017	1	0	0	0	0	0
54	Leighton Eksteen	Utility back	2016	5	0	0	0	0	0
16	Jacques Engelbrecht	Loose-forward	2013, 2016	25	5	1	0	0	0
18	Jaco Engels	Prop	2013	4	0	0	0	0	0
42	Martin Ferreira	Hooker	2016	9	0	0	0	0	0
1	Schalk Ferreira	Prop	2013, 2016–2017	34	15	3	0	0	0
94	Justin Forwood	Prop	2017	7	10	2	0	0	0
59	Louis Fouché	Fly-half	2016	14	81	1	17	14	0
31	Hannes Franklin	Hooker	2013	8	5	1	0	0	0
37	Shane Gates	Centre	2013, 2016	19	5	1	0	0	0
78	Ross Geldenhuys	Prop	2017	13	0	0	0	0	0
35	Siyanda Grey	Utility back	2013, 2016	5	0	0	0	0	0
67	James Hall	Scrum-half	2016	7	10	2	0	0	0
102	Stokkies Hanekom	Centre	2017	5	0	0	0	0	0
93	Kurt Haupt	Hooker	2017	8	0	0	0	0	0
87	Chris Heiberg	Prop	2017	7	0	0	0	0	0
69	Liam Hendricks	Prop	2016	1	0	0	0	0	0
79	Irné Herbst	Lock	2017	13	0	0	0	0	0
19	Johan Herbst	Scrum-half	2013	1	0	0	0	0	0
71	Cornell Hess	Lock	2016	1	0	0	0	0	0
73	Dewald Human	Utility back	2016	3	10	1	1	1	0
49	Malcolm Jaer	Wing	2016–2017	19	40	8	0	0	0
70	JP Jonck	Flanker	2016	1	0	0	0	0	0
47	Ntando Kebe	Scrum-half	2016	13	0	0	0	0	0
30	Grant Kemp	Prop	2013	12	0	0	0	0	0
34	Michael Killian	Wing	2013	4	0	0	0	0	0
84	Berton Klaasen	Centre	2017	15	0	0	0	0	0
36	Virgile Lacombe	Hooker	2013	4	0	0	0	0	0
25	Tomás Leonardi	Loose-forward	2013	1	0	0	0	0	0
81	Ruaan Lerm	Flanker	2017	7	10	2	0	0	0
63	Kevin Luiters	Scrum-half	2016	8	0	0	0	0	0
106	Mzamo Majola	Prop	2017	4	0	0	0	0	0
2	Bandise Maku	Hooker	2013	16	0	0	0	0	0
41	Thabo Mamojele	Loose-forward	2013	1	0	0	0	0	0
75	Sintu Manjezi	Lock	2016	2	0	0	0	0	0
85	Makazole Mapimpi	Winger	2017	14	55	11	0	0	0
15	SP Marais	Outside back	2013	8	0	0	0	0	0
17	Edgar Marutlulle	Hooker	2013, 2016	17	20	4	0	0	0
39	Mpho Mbiyozo	Loose-forward	2013	1	5	1	0	0	0
72	Wandile Mjekevu	Wing	2016–2017	11	30	6	0	0	0
103	Giant Mtyanda	Lock	2017	6	5	1	0	0	0
27	Waylon Murray	Centre	2013, 2017	14	0	0	0	0	0
20	Darron Nell	Utility forward	2013	5	0	0	0	0	0
74	Andisa Ntsila	Flanker	2016–2017	16	5	1	0	0	0
56	Schalk Oelofse	Lock	2016	13	0	0	0	0	0
29	Devin Oosthuizen	Loose-forward	2013	9	0	0	0	0	0
22	Hadleigh Parkes	Utility back	2013	5	0	0	0	0	0
88	Tyler Paul	Lock	2017	15	5	1	0	0	0
100	Yaw Penxe	Winger	2017	5	10	2	0	0	0
14	Sergeal Petersen	Wing	2013	8	20	4	0	0	0
55	Charles Radebe	Wing	2016	1	0	0	0	0	0
11	Marcello Sampson	Wing	2013	13	0	0	0	0	0
82	Louis Schreuder	Scrum-half	2017	14	5	1	0	0	0
95	Ricky Schroeder	Scrum-half	2017	2	0	0	0	0	0
57	Sti Sithole	Prop	2016	10	0	0	0	0	0
32	Siviwe Soyizwapi	Outside back	2013	6	0	0	0	0	0
97	Johan Steyn	Scrum-half	2017	8	0	0	0	0	0
12	Andries Strauss	Centre	2013	14	0	0	0	0	0
5	Steven Sykes	Lock	2013, 2016	26	25	5	0	0	0
99	Johann Tromp	Fullback	2017	1	0	0	0	0	0
105	Stefan Ungerer	Scrum-half	2017	3	0	0	0	0	0
33	Scott van Breda	Utility back	2013	1	0	0	0	0	0
91	Schalk van der Merwe	Prop	2017	12	0	0	0	0	0
96	Wilhelm van der Sluys	Lock	2017	11	0	0	0	0	0
6	Wimpie van der Walt	Loose-forward	2013	15	30	6	0	0	0
101	Dayan van der Westhuizen	Prop	2017	10	0	0	0	0	0
90	Rudi van Rooyen	Scrum-half	2017	3	5	1	0	0	0
62	Jaco van Tonder	Fullback	2016	5	0	0	0	0	0
28	Elric van Vuuren	Fullback	2013	2	0	0	0	0	0
53	CJ Velleman	Flanker	2016	10	0	0	0	0	0
9	Shaun Venter	Scrum-half	2013	16	10	2	0	0	0
21	Nicolás Vergallo	Scrum-half	2013	14	5	1	0	0	0
52	Jurgen Visser	Fullback	2016	10	3	0	0	1	0
51	Luzuko Vulindlu	Wing	2016–2017	25	25	5	0	0	0
76	Jeremy Ward	Centre	2016	2	0	0	0	0	0
61	Stefan Watermeyer	Centre	2016	12	17	3	1	0	0
7	Luke Watson	Loose-forward	2013	6	10	2	0	0	0
48	Elgar Watts	Fly-half	2016	11	31	1	4	6	0
24	George Whitehead	Utility back	2013	15	31	2	6	3	0
77	Mike Willemse	Hooker	2017	12	5	1	0	0	0
65	Stefan Willemse	Flanker	2016–2017	19	0	0	0	0	0
80	Mzwanele Zito	Lock	2017	8	0	0	0	0	0

=== Super Rugby promotion/relegation playoffs ===
The following players represented the Southern Kings in the 2013 relegation play-offs. These matches were official first class matches according to the South African Rugby Union, but not included by SANZAAR in official Super Rugby appearances statistics.

List of Southern Kings players
Name	Position/s	Period	Apps	Pts	Try	Con	Pen	DG
David Bulbring	Lock	2013	2	0	0	0	0	0
Kevin Buys	Prop	2013	2	0	0	0	0	0
Demetri Catrakilis	Fly-half	2013	1	9	0	0	3	0
Ronnie Cooke	Utility back	2013	2	0	0	0	0	0
Charl du Plessis	Prop	2013	1	0	0	0	0	0
Cornell du Preez	Loose-forward	2013	2	0	0	0	0	0
Jacques Engelbrecht	Loose-forward	2013	2	0	0	0	0	0
Schalk Ferreira	Prop	2013	2	5	1	0	0	0
Hannes Franklin	Hooker	2013	2	0	0	0	0	0
Shane Gates	Centre	2013	2	0	0	0	0	0
Grant Kemp	Prop	2013	1	0	0	0	0	0
Bandise Maku	Hooker	2013	2	0	0	0	0	0
SP Marais	Outside back	2013	2	0	0	0	0	0
Waylon Murray	Centre	2013	1	0	0	0	0	0
Darron Nell	Utility forward	2013	2	0	0	0	0	0
Devin Oosthuizen	Loose-forward	2013	2	0	0	0	0	0
Hadleigh Parkes	Utility back	2013	2	0	0	0	0	0
Marcello Sampson	Wing	2013	1	5	1	0	0	0
Steven Sykes	Lock	2013	2	5	1	0	0	0
Scott van Breda	Utility back	2013	1	18	1	2	3	0
Wimpie van der Walt	Loose-forward	2013	2	0	0	0	0	0
Shaun Venter	Scrum-half	2013	2	0	0	0	0	0
George Whitehead	Utility back	2013	2	0	0	0	0	0

== Pro14 players ==
The following 99 players represented the Southern Kings in the Pro14 competition between 2017–18 and 2020:

List of Southern Kings Pro14 players
Cap no	Name	Position/s	Period	Apps	Pts	Try	Con	Pen	DG
86	Josh Allderman	Scrum-half	2019–2020	8	0	0	0	0	0
56	JC Astle	Lock	2018–2020	29	0	0	0	0	0
50	Lusanda Badiyana	Flank	2018–2020	13	0	0	0	0	0
33	Tango Balekile	Hooker	2017–2018	12	0	0	0	0	0
15	Masixole Banda	Fly-half / Fullback	2017–2020	42	155	4	39	19	0
60	Bjorn Basson	Wing	2018–2019	17	40	8	0	0	0
58	Ulrich Beyers	Centre / Fullback	2018–2019	9	10	2	0	0	0
87	Thembelani Bholi	Loose forward	2019–2020	10	0	0	0	0	0
63	Tristan Blewett	Centre / Wing	2018	2	0	0	0	0	0
30	Alshaun Bock	Wing	2017–2018	7	0	0	0	0	0
99	Tiaan Botes	Fly-half	2020	1	0	0	0	0	0
55	Michael Botha	Fullback	2018	4	5	1	0	0	0
46	Eital Bredenkamp	Flank	2018	6	5	1	0	0	0
54	Brandon Brown	Flank	2018–2019	8	0	0	0	0	0
40	Tienie Burger	Flank	2017–2019	37	15	3	0	0	0
76	Demetri Catrakilis	Fly-half	2019–2020	7	43	0	8	9	0
22	Stephan Coetzee	Hooker	2017–2018	18	0	0	0	0	0
10	Kurt Coleman	Fly-half	2017–2018	8	39	0	12	5	0
89	Erich Cronjé	Centre	2019–2020	10	25	5	0	0	0
97	Luyolo Dapula	Flanker	2020	1	0	0	0	0	0
95	Cameron Dawson	Prop	2020	1	0	0	0	0	0
3	Rossouw de Klerk	Prop	2017–2020	25	5	1	0	0	0
20	Bobby de Wee	Lock	2017–2020	39	10	2	0	0	0
28	Pieter-Steyn de Wet	Fly-half	2017	3	18	0	3	4	0
59	Stephan de Wit	Flank	2018–2019	9	0	0	0	0	0
26	Martin Dreyer	Prop	2017–2018	7	0	0	0	0	0
81	Jacques du Toit	Hooker	2019–2020	12	0	0	0	0	0
35	Martin du Toit	Fly-half	2017–2019	22	19	3	2	0	0
23	Ntabeni Dukisa	Utility back	2017–2019	18	36	5	4	1	0
1	Schalk Ferreira	Prop	2017–2020	43	5	1	0	0	0
82	Aston Fortuin	Lock	2019–2020	11	5	1	0	0	0
51	Justin Forwood	Prop	2018	10	0	0	0	0	0
32	Rowan Gouws	Scrum-half	2017–2018	11	0	0	0	0	0
25	Stephan Greeff	Lock	2017–2019	32	5	1	0	0	0
79	Christopher Hollis	Centre / Wing	2019–2020	8	10	2	0	0	0
77	JT Jackson	Centre	2019–2020	9	15	2	1	1	0
45	Benhard Janse van Rensburg	Fly-half	2017–2018	5	4	0	2	0	0
13	Berton Klaasen	Centre	2017–2019	36	25	5	0	0	0
42	Harlon Klaasen	Centre	2017–2019	26	45	9	0	0	0
65	Tertius Kruger	Centre	2018–2019	17	15	3	0	0	0
34	Ruaan Lerm	Number eight	2017–2020	45	10	2	0	0	0
80	Andell Loubser	Utility back	2019–2020	6	0	0	0	0	0
83	Elrigh Louw	Loose-forward	2019–2020	12	5	1	0	0	0
96	Eddie Ludick	Wing	2020	2	0	0	0	0	0
6	Khaya Majola	Flank	2017–2018	9	0	0	0	0	0
36	Mzamo Majola	Prop	2017	2	0	0	0	0	0
37	Michael Makase	Wing	2017–2019	18	20	4	0	0	0
92	Theo Maree	Scrum-half	2019–2020	5	0	0	0	0	0
17	Godlen Masimla	Scrum-half	2017–2018	25	15	3	0	0	0
88	Siya Masuku	Fly-half	2019–2020	4	10	0	5	0	0
21	Siya Mdaka	Flank	2017	3	0	0	0	0	0
57	Lupumlo Mguca	Prop	2018–2019	12	5	1	0	0	0
91	Gavin Mills	Scrum-half	2019	1	0	0	0	0	0
78	Howard Mnisi	Centre	2019–2020	7	5	1	0	0	0
31	Giant Mtyanda	Lock	2017–2019	10	0	0	0	0	0
16	Jacques Nel	Centre	2017–2018	13	10	2	0	0	0
29	Freddy Ngoza	Loose-forward	2017–2018	3	0	0	0	0	0
8	Andisa Ntsila	Loose-forward	2017–2019	33	10	2	0	0	0
53	Schalk Oelofse	Lock	2018–2019	8	0	0	0	0	0
68	NJ Oosthuizen	Prop	2018–2019	5	0	0	0	0	0
14	Yaw Penxe	Wing	2017–2020	41	65	13	0	0	0
72	Bader Pretorius	Fly-half	2019–2020	13	38	2	8	4	0
71	Sarel Pretorius	Scrum-half	2019	8	5	1	0	0	0
94	Ig Prinsloo	Prop	2020	3	0	0	0	0	0
18	Luvuyo Pupuma	Prop	2017–2019	26	15	3	0	0	0
66	Meli Rokoua	Centre	2018–2019	11	0	0	0	0	0
52	JC Roos	Fly-half	2018	1	0	0	0	0	0
38	Jarryd Sage	Centre	2017	1	0	0	0	0	0
84	Juan Schoeman	Prop	2019	6	0	0	0	0	0
43	Pieter Scholtz	Prop	2017–2020	27	0	0	0	0	0
7	Victor Sekekete	Flank	2017	4	0	0	0	0	0
75	Jerry Sexton	Lock	2019–2020	12	0	0	0	0	0
11	S'bura Sithole	Wing	2017–2020	18	0	0	0	0	0
47	Joe Smith	Prop	2018	5	0	0	0	0	0
49	JP Smith	Scrum-half	2018	2	0	0	0	0	0
93	Chad Solomon	Hooker	2019	1	0	0	0	0	0
98	Robin Stevens	Hooker	2020	1	0	0	0	0	0
27	Piet-Louw Strauss	Prop	2017	1	0	0	0	0	0
19	Entienne Swanepoel	Prop	2017	4	0	0	0	0	0
73	De-Jay Terblanche	Prop	2019–2020	10	0	0	0	0	0
69	Alulutho Tshakweni	Prop	2018–2019	14	0	0	0	0	0
85	Josiah Twum-Boafo	Wing	2019–2020	5	0	0	0	0	0
67	Stefan Ungerer	Scrum-half	2018–2020	22	40	8	0	0	0
90	Scott van Breda	Utility back	2019	3	18	1	2	3	0
48	Dayan van der Westhuizen	Prop	2018	4	0	0	0	0	0
64	Ruan van Rensburg	Scrum-half / Wing	2018	1	0	0	0	0	0
44	Alandré van Rooyen	Hooker	2017–2020	35	5	1	0	0	0
9	Rudi van Rooyen	Scrum-half	2017–2019	24	5	1	0	0	0
5	Dries van Schalkwyk	Lock	2017–2019	26	15	3	0	0	0
4	Jurie van Vuuren	Lock	2017–2019	12	0	0	0	0	0
70	Kerron van Vuuren	Hooker	2018	1	0	0	0	0	0
62	CJ Velleman	Flank	2018–2019	10	5	1	0	0	0
41	Anthony Volmink	Wing	2017–2018	6	5	1	0	0	0
61	Xandré Vos	Prop	2018–2020	12	0	0	0	0	0
12	Luzuko Vulindlu	Centre	2017–2018	16	20	4	0	0	0
39	Lindokuhle Welemu	Lock	2017–2018	8	5	1	0	0	0
2	Mike Willemse	Hooker	2017–2019	30	35	7	0	0	0
74	Courtney Winnaar	Utility back	2019–2020	7	3	0	0	1	0
24	Oliver Zono	Fly-half	2017–2019	9	23	0	7	3	0

== See also ==
- Southern Kings
- Super Rugby
- Pro14
