= List of 2019–20 Pro14 transfers =

This is a list of player transfers involving Pro14 rugby union teams between the end of the 2018–19 season and 12 March 2020. Unlike in previous seasons where the bulk of player transfers occurred between seasons, a large number of player transfers instead took place mid-season due to the disruption caused by the coronavirus pandemic.

== Benetton ==
=== Players in ===
- (South Africa) Eli Snyman from (South Africa) Blue Bulls
- (Ireland) Ian Keatley from (England) London Irish
- (Italy) Michele Lamaro from (Italy) Petrarca
- (Italy) Charly Trussardi from (France) Béziers
- (Italy) Leonardo Sarto from (England) Leicester Tigers

=== Players out ===
- (Italy) Luca Bigi to (Italy) Zebre
- (Italy) Robert Barbieri retired
- (Italy) Alberto De Marchi retired
- (Italy) Tommaso Iannone retired
- (Italy) Edoardo Gori to (France) Colomiers
- (Italy) Andrea Bronzini to (Italy) San Donà
- (Italy) Giorgio Bronzini to (Italy) Viadana
- (Italy) Ornel Gega retired

== Cardiff Blues ==
=== Players in ===
- (Wales) Josh Adams from (England) Worcester Warriors
- (Wales) Hallam Amos from (Wales) Dragons
- (Wales) James Botham promoted from Academy
- (Wales) Kieron Assiratti promoted from Academy
- (Wales) Shane Lewis-Hughes promoted from Academy
- (Wales) Will Boyde from (Wales) Scarlets
- (Wales) Jason Tovey from (Wales) Dragons
- (Wales) Rory Thornton from (Wales) Ospreys
- (Wales) Ben Thomas promoted from Academy
- (Samoa) Filo Paulo from (England) London Irish
- (England) Sam Moore from (England) Sale Sharks

=== Players out ===
- (Wales) Matthew Rees retired
- (Wales) Jack Roberts to (England) Doncaster Knights
- (Wales) Rhys Carré to (England) Saracens
- (Wales) Gareth Anscombe to (Wales) Ospreys
- (Wales) Tom Williams to Jersey Reds
- (South Africa) George Earle to (France) Colomiers
- (United States) Blaine Scully released
- (Wales) Ben Jones to (Wales) Pontypridd
- (Wales) Dane Blacker to (Wales) Scarlets
- Cameron Lewis to Wales Sevens
- (Wales) George Thomas to (Wales) Cardiff
- (Wales) Tom James to (Wales) Scarlets
- (Wales) Sion Bennett to (Hong Kong) Valley
- (Wales) Corey Howells to (Wales) Newport

== Cheetahs ==
=== Players in ===
- (South Africa) Ruan Pienaar from (France) Montpellier
- (South Africa) Wilmar Arnoldi from (South Africa) Griquas
- (South Africa) Chris Massyn from (South Africa) Stormers
- (South Africa) Chris Smit from (South Africa) Griquas
- (South Africa) Rhyno Smith from (South Africa) Sharks
- (South Africa) Duncan Saal from (South Africa) Stormers
- (South Africa) Craig Barry from (South Africa) Stormers
- (South Africa) Francois Agenbag from (South Africa) Free State XV
- (South Africa) Clayton Blommetjies from (Wales) Scarlets
- (South Africa) Eddie Davids from (South Africa) Free State U21
- (South Africa) Lubabalo Dobela from (South Africa) Free State XV
- (South Africa) Nathan Jordan from (South Africa) Free State U21
- (South Africa) Sias Koen from (South Africa) Griquas (season-long loan)
- (South Africa) Rewan Kruger from (South Africa) Free State U21
- (South Africa) Conan le Fluer from (South Africa) Free State U21
- (South Africa) JW Meades from (South Africa) Free State U21
- (South Africa) Keanan Murray from (South Africa) Free State XV
- (South Africa) Aya Oliphant from (South Africa) Free State XV
- (South Africa) Ruwald van der Merwe from (South Africa) Free State U21
- (South Africa) Janus Venter from (South Africa) Free State XV
- (South Africa) Anthony Volmink from (South Africa) Griquas (season-long loan)
- (South Africa) George Whitehead from (South Africa) Griquas (season-long loan)

=== Players out ===
- (South Africa) Stephan Malan to (Italy) Lazio
- (South Africa) Elandré Huggett released
- (South Africa) Ernst Stapelberg released
- (South Africa) Dennis Visser released
- (South Africa) Jannes Snyman to (South Africa) Falcons
- (South Africa) Nico Lee to (France) Brive
- (South Africa) Niell Jordaan to (South Africa) Griquas
- (South Africa) Louis Conradie to (New Zealand) Otago
- (South Africa) Niell Stannard to (South Africa) Griffons
- (South Africa) Ntokozo Vidima to (South Africa) Border Bulldogs
- (South Africa) Quintin Vorster to (South Africa) Griffons
- (South Africa) Jacques du Toit to (South Africa) Southern Kings
- (South Africa) Ryno Eksteen released
- (South Africa) Lloyd Greeff released
- (South Africa) Johan Kotze released
- (South Africa) Vuyani Maqina released
- (South Africa) Luigy van Jaarsveld released
- (South Africa) Henco Venter to (South Africa) Sharks
- (South Africa) Ox Nché to (South Africa) Sharks
- (South Africa) Shaun Venter to (Wales) Ospreys
- (South Africa) Abongile Nonkontwana to (South Africa) Bulls

== Connacht ==
=== Players in ===
- (Ireland) Paul Boyle promoted from Academy
- (Ireland) Paddy McAllister from (England) Gloucester
- (Ireland) Matthew Burke promoted from Academy
- (Ireland) Conor Fitzgerald promoted from Academy
- (Ireland) Conor Kenny promoted from Academy
- (Ireland) Tom Daly from (Ireland) Leinster
- (Ireland) Stephen Fitzgerald from (Ireland) Munster
- (Ireland) Angus Lloyd from (Ireland) Clontarf
- (Ireland) Rory Burke from (England) Nottingham
- (Ireland) Stephen Kerins promoted from Academy
- John Porch from Australia Sevens
- (Australia) Will Goddard from (Australia) Brumbies Academy (short-term deal)

=== Players out ===
- (Ireland) Cian Kelleher to (Ireland) Leinster
- (Ireland) Conor Carey to (England) Worcester Warriors
- (Ireland) Eoin Griffin retired
- (Ireland) Conor McKeon retired
- (England) James Cannon to (England) Ealing Trailfinders
- (Ireland) Conán O'Donnell to (Japan) Sunwolves
- (Ireland) James Connolly to (England) Nottingham
- (England) James Mitchell to (England) Northampton Saints
- (Ireland) Peter Claffey to (Ireland) Terenure College
- (Ireland) Craig Ronaldson to (Ireland) Lansdowne

== Dragons ==
=== Players in ===
- (Wales) Sam Davies from (Wales) Ospreys
- (Ireland) James McCarthy from (Ireland) Munster
- (Scotland) Jack Cosgrove from (England) Worcester Warriors
- (England) Tom Griffiths from (England) Saracens
- (England) Luke Baldwin from (England) Worcester Warriors (season long loan)
- Owen Jenkins from Wales Sevens (short term loan)
- Ben Roach from Wales Sevens (short term loan)
- (Wales) Dan Babos promoted from Academy
- (Wales) Taine Basham promoted from Academy
- (Wales) Connor Edwards promoted from Academy
- (Wales) Lennon Greggains promoted from Academy
- (Wales) Josh Reynolds promoted from Academy
- (Wales) Max Williams promoted from Academy
- (Wales) Rio Dyer promoted from Academy
- (Ireland) Conor Maguire from (Ireland) Old Wesley (short term trial)

=== Players out ===
- (Wales) Gerard Ellis to (England) Coventry
- (Wales) Hallam Amos to (Wales) Cardiff Blues
- (Wales) Calvin Wellington to (England) Sale FC
- (Wales) Rhodri Davies to (England) Cornish Pirates
- (Wales) Gavin Henson retired
- (South Africa) Zane Kirchner released
- (South Africa) Rynard Landman to (France) Montauban
- (Wales) Jason Tovey to (Wales) Cardiff Blues
- George Gasson to Wales Sevens
- (Wales) Dan Suter to (New Zealand) South Canterbury
- (South Africa) Jarryd Sage to (England) Ampthill
- (Wales) Henri Williams to (England) Ampthill
- (South Africa) Tiaan Loots to (United States) Houston SaberCats
- (Scotland) Jack Cosgrove retired

== Edinburgh ==
=== Players in ===
- (Scotland) Murray Douglas from (Australia) Brumbies (short-term deal)
- (Scotland) Jamie Bhatti from (Scotland) Glasgow Warriors
- (Australia) Nick Haining from (England) Bristol Bears
- (South Africa) Mike Willemse from (South Africa) Southern Kings
- (Fiji) Eroni Sau from (France) Perpignan
- Mesulame Kunavula from Fiji Sevens
- (South Africa) Nic Groom from (South Africa) Lions
- (Scotland) Ewan Ashman from (England) Sale Sharks (short-term loan)
- Jamie Farndale from Scotland Sevens

=== Players out ===
- (Scotland) Allan Dell to (England) London Irish
- (England) Nathan Fowles to (England) Ealing Trailfinders
- (Fiji) Senitiki Nayalo to (England) Coventry
- (Scotland) Ross Ford retired
- Tom Brown to Scotland Sevens
- (Scotland) Luke Hamilton to (Japan) NTT DoCoMo Red Hurricanes
- (Argentina) Juan Pablo Socino to (Spain) El Salvador
- (Scotland) Sean Kennedy to (Scotland) Glasgow Warriors
- (Scotland) Darryl Marfo to (Wales) Ospreys
- (England) Jack Stanley to (England) Gloucester

== Glasgow Warriors ==
=== Players in ===
- (Scotland) Stafford McDowall promoted from Academy
- (Scotland) Andrew Davidson from (England) Newcastle Falcons
- Kyle Steyn from Scotland Sevens
- (Scotland) George Thornton from (England) Wasps
- (England) Charlie Capps from (France) Stade Niçois
- (Scotland) Jamie Dobie from (Scotland) Merchiston Castle School
- (Fiji) Mesu Dolokoto from (Fiji) Fijian Drua
- (Fiji) Jale Vakaloloma from (Australia) Brisbane City
- (Scotland) Sean Kennedy from (Scotland) Edinburgh
- (New Zealand) Aki Seiuli from (New Zealand) Otago
- (Fiji) Leone Nakarawa from (France) Racing 92

=== Players out ===
- (Scotland) Stuart Hogg to (England) Exeter Chiefs
- (Scotland) Lewis Wynne to (England) London Scottish
- (Scotland) Jamie Bhatti to (Scotland) Edinburgh
- (Scotland) James Malcolm to (England) London Scottish
- (Scotland) Robbie Smith to (England) Bedford Blues
- (Samoa) Brian Alainu'uese to (France) Toulon
- (New Zealand) Lelia Masaga released
- (Scotland) Kevin Bryce to (Scotland) Glasgow High Kelvinside
- (Scotland) Alex Dunbar to (France) Brive

== Leinster ==
=== Players in ===
- (Ireland) Cian Kelleher from (Ireland) Connacht
- (Ireland) Ciarán Frawley promoted from Academy
- (Ireland) Hugo Keenan promoted from Academy
- (Ireland) Rónan Kelleher promoted from Academy
- (Ireland) Conor O'Brien promoted from Academy
- (Ireland) Jimmy O'Brien promoted from Academy
- (Ireland) Hugh O'Sullivan promoted from Academy
- (Ireland) Scott Penny promoted from Academy
- (Ireland) Rowan Osborne from (Ireland) Dublin University

=== Players out ===
- (Ireland) Nick McCarthy to (Ireland) Munster
- (Ireland) Seán O'Brien to (England) London Irish
- (Ireland) Jack McGrath to (Ireland) Ulster
- (Ireland) Tom Daly to (Ireland) Connacht
- (Ireland) Noel Reid to (England) Leicester Tigers
- (Ireland) Ian Nagle to (Italy) Zebre
- (Ireland) Mick Kearney to (Italy) Zebre

== Munster ==
=== Players in ===
- (Ireland) Gavin Coombes promoted from Academy
- (Ireland) Shane Daly promoted from Academy
- (Ireland) Nick McCarthy from (Ireland) Leinster
- (Ireland) Seán O'Connor promoted from Academy
- (Ireland) Craig Casey promoted from Academy
- (Australia) Jed Holloway from (Australia) Waratahs (Two-month contract)

=== Players out ===
- (Ireland) Stephen Fitzgerald to (Ireland) Connacht
- (South Africa) Jaco Taute to (England) Leicester Tigers
- (Ireland) Duncan Williams released
- (Ireland) Bill Johnston to (Ireland) Ulster
- (Ireland) James McCarthy to (Wales) Dragons
- (Ireland) James Hart to (France) Biarritz
- (Ireland) Dave O'Callaghan to (France) Biarritz
- (Ireland) Mike Sherry retired
- (New Zealand) Tyler Bleyendaal retired
- (Ireland) Brian Scott retired

== Ospreys ==
=== Players in ===
- (Wales) Gareth Anscombe from (Wales) Cardiff Blues
- (Wales) Harri Morgan promoted from Academy
- (Wales) Tiaan Thomas-Wheeler promoted from Academy
- (England) Gareth Evans from (England) Gloucester
- (Wales) Dewi Lake promoted from Academy
- (Wales) Morgan Morris promoted from Academy
- (Wales) Will Griffiths promoted from Academy
- (Wales) Kieran Williams promoted from Academy
- (South Africa) Shaun Venter from (South Africa) Cheetahs
- (England) Ben Glynn from (England) Harlequins
- (South Africa) Marvin Orie from (South Africa) Lions (short-term deal)
- (New Zealand) Marty McKenzie from (New Zealand) Chiefs
- (Wales) Rhys Fawcett from (Wales) Scarlets (season-long loan)
- (Wales) Simon Gardiner from (Wales) Scarlets (season-long loan)
- (Scotland) Darryl Marfo from (Scotland) Edinburgh
- (Wales) Cai Evans promoted from Academy

=== Players out ===
- (Wales) Scott Baldwin to (England) Harlequins
- (Wales) Joe Thomas to (New Zealand) Otorohanga
- (Wales) Sam Davies to (Wales) Dragons
- (Wales) Rory Thornton to (Wales) Cardiff Blues
- (Wales) Tom Habberfield to (Wales) Cardiff
- (Wales) Alex Jeffries to (Wales) Scarlets
- (Wales) James Ratti to (Wales) Cardiff
- (Wales) Rob McCusker retired
- (Georgia (country)) Giorgi Nemsadze retired
- (Argentina) Guido Volpi to (England) Doncaster Knights (season-long loan)

== Scarlets ==
=== Players in ===
- (Tonga) Sam Lousi from (New Zealand) Hurricanes
- (Wales) Dan Davis promoted from Academy
- (Wales) Dane Blacker from (Wales) Cardiff Blues
- (New Zealand) Danny Drake from (New Zealand) North Harbour
- (Wales) Alex Jeffries from (Wales) Ospreys
- (Wales) Tom James from (Wales) Cardiff Blues
- (Fiji) Tevita Ratuva from (France) Bordeaux
- (Wales) Liam Williams from (England) Saracens

=== Players out ===
- (Wales) Scott Jenkins to (England) Bedford Blues
- (England) Tom Price to (England) Exeter Chiefs
- (Wales) Will Boyde to (Wales) Cardiff Blues
- (South Africa) David Bulbring to (Japan) Kubota Spears
- (Scotland) Sam Hidalgo-Clyne to (France) Racing 92
- (Wales) Nicky Thomas to (England) Bristol Bears
- (Wales) Declan Smith to (New Zealand) Tasman
- (South Africa) Clayton Blommetjies to (South Africa) Cheetahs
- (Wales) Rhys Fawcett to (Wales) Ospreys (season-long loan)
- (Wales) Simon Gardiner to (Wales) Ospreys (season-long loan)

== Southern Kings ==
=== Players in ===
- (Ireland) Jerry Sexton from Jersey Reds
- (South Africa) Josh Allderman from (South Africa) Blue Bulls U21
- (Cameroon) Christian Ambadiang from (South Africa) Naka Bulls
- (South Africa) Lusanda Badiyana unattached
- (South Africa) Thembelani Bholi from (South Africa) Bulls
- (South Africa) Erich Cronjé from (South Africa) Blue Bulls U21
- (South Africa) Cameron Dawson from (South Africa) Free State XV
- (South Africa) Andell Loubser from (South Africa) Blue Bulls U21
- (South Africa) Siya Masuku from (South Africa) Leopards
- (South Africa) Gavin Mills from (South Africa) Boland Landbouskool
- (South Africa) Howard Mnisi from (South Africa) Golden Lions
- (South Africa) Ig Prinsloo from (South Africa) Naka Bulls
- (South Africa) Christopher Hollis from (South Africa) NMMU Madibaz
- (South Africa) Josiah Twum-Boafo from (South Africa) NMMU Madibaz
- (South Africa) Demetri Catrakilis from (England) Harlequins
- (South Africa) Aston Fortuin from (South Africa) Blue Bulls XV
- (South Africa) JT Jackson from (South Africa) Bulls
- (South Africa) Elrigh Louw from (South Africa) Free State U21
- (South Africa) Jacques du Toit from (South Africa) Cheetahs

=== Players out ===
- (South Africa) Mike Willemse to (Scotland) Edinburgh
- (South Africa) Berton Klaasen released
- (South Africa) Andisa Ntsila released
- (Italy) Dries van Schalkwyk released
- (South Africa) Ntabeni Dukisa to (South Africa) Eastern Province Elephants
- (South Africa) Martin du Toit to (South Africa) Eastern Province Elephants
- (South Africa) Giant Mtyanda to (South Africa) Eastern Province Elephants
- (South Africa) Jurie van Vuuren to (South Africa) Eastern Province Elephants
- (South Africa) Justin Forwood to (France) Angoulême
- (South Africa) Stephan de Wit to (South Africa) Eastern Province Elephants
- (South Africa) Luvuyo Pupuma to (South Africa) Eastern Province Elephants
- (Fiji) Meli Rokoua to (South Africa) Eastern Province Elephants
- (South Africa) Oliver Zono to (South Africa) Eastern Province Elephants
- (South Africa) Martin Dreyer released
- (South Africa) Stephan Greeff released
- (South Africa) Harlon Klaasen released
- (South Africa) Bjorn Basson to (South Africa) Griquas
- (South Africa) Ulrich Beyers released
- (South Africa) Michael Makase released
- (South Africa) Ruan van Rensburg released
- (South Africa) Rudi van Rooyen released

== Ulster ==
=== Players in ===
- (Australia) Sam Carter from (Australia) Brumbies
- (Ireland) Michael Lowry promoted from Academy
- (Ireland) Eric O'Sullivan promoted from Academy
- (Ireland) James Hume promoted from Academy
- (South Africa) Gareth Milasinovich from (England) Worcester Warriors
- (Ireland) Jack McGrath from (Ireland) Leinster
- (New Zealand) Matt Faddes from (New Zealand) Highlanders
- (Ireland) Bill Johnston from (Ireland) Munster
- (Ireland) Robert Baloucoune promoted from Academy
- (Ireland) Angus Kernohan promoted from Academy
- (Ireland) Zack McCall promoted from Academy
- (Ireland) Marcus Rea promoted from Academy
- (Ireland) David O'Connor from (Ireland) Lansdowne

=== Players out ===
- (Ireland) Alex Thompson to Jersey Reds
- (Ireland) Darren Cave retired
- (Ireland) Rory Best retired
- (Ireland) Caleb Montgomery to (England) Worcester Warriors
- (Ireland) David Busby to (United States) Seattle Seawolves
- (Canada) Peter Nelson released
- (Ireland) Jack Owens released
- (Ireland) Johnny McPhillips to (England) Leicester Tigers

== Zebre ==
=== Players in ===
- (Italy) Luca Bigi from (Italy) Benetton
- (Romania) Alexandru Țăruș from (England) Sale Sharks
- (Italy) Paolo Buonfiglio from (Italy) Mogliano
- (Australia) Junior Laloifi from (New Zealand) Manawatu
- (Italy) Michelangelo Biondelli from (Italy) Fiamme Oro
- (Italy) Pierre Bruno from (Italy) Calvisano
- (Italy) Danilo Fischetti from (Italy) Calvisano
- (Italy) Enrico Lucchin from (Italy) Calvisano
- (Italy) Marco Manfredi from (Italy) Calvisano
- (England) Charlie Walker from (England) Harlequins
- (Ireland) Ian Nagle from (Ireland) Leinster
- (Ireland) Mick Kearney from (Ireland) Leinster
- (Italy) Lorenzo Masselli from (Italy) Lyons Piacenza

=== Players out ===
- (Tonga) Matu Tevi released
- (Italy) Matteo Minozzi to (England) Wasps
- (Argentina) Nicolas de Battista to (England) Cornish Pirates
- (Australia) Cruze Ah-Nau released
- (Italy) Dario Chistolini to (Italy) Valorugby Emilia
- (Argentina) Marco Ciccioli to (Argentina) CASI
- (Italy) Riccardo Raffaele to (Italy) Colorno
- (Italy) Maicol Azzolini to (Italy) Fiamme Oro
- (Italy) Luhandre Luus to (Italy) Valorugby Emilia
- (Fiji) James Brown to (Russia) Enisei-STM
- (Italy) Giovanbattista Venditti to (Italy) Avezzano Rugby

== See also ==
- List of 2019–20 Premiership Rugby transfers
- List of 2019–20 RFU Championship transfers
- List of 2019–20 Super Rugby transfers
- List of 2019–20 Top 14 transfers
- List of 2019–20 Major League Rugby transfers
