= Christopher Hollis =

Christopher Hollis may refer to:

- Christopher Hollis (politician) (1902–1977), British schoolmaster, author and MP
- Christopher Hollis (rugby union) (born 1998), South African rugby union player
