= Charly Trussardi =

Italian rugby union player

- Born: 21 March 1997 (age 29) Baie-Mahault
- Height: 1.78 m (5 ft 10 in)
- Weight: 88 kg (13 st 12 lb; 194 lb)

Rugby union career
- Position: Scrum-Half
- Current team: Benetton/Rovigo Delta
Youth career
- Clermont Auvergne
Senior career
Years	Team	Apps	(Points)
2017−2019	Clermont Auvergne	8	(0)
2018−2019	→Béziers Hérault	14	(5)
2019−2021	Benetton	9	(0)
2020−2021	→Rovigo Delta	12	(0)
2021−	Albi		
- Correct as of 26 Mar 2021
International career
Years	Team	Apps	(Points)
2016−2017	Italy Under 20	16	(0)
2018	Emerging Italy	3	(0)
- Correct as of 16 May 2020

Charly Trussardi (Baie-Mahault, 21 March 1997) is an Guadalupean-born Italian rugby union player. His usual position is as a Scrum-Half and he currently plays for Albi in Top14.

From 2019 to 2021, Trussardi played with Italian Pro14 team Benetton. In 2020-21 season, he played also for Rovigo Delta in Top10 as additional player from Benetton.

After playing for Italy Under 20 in 2016 and 2017, in 2018 Trussardi was named in the Emerging Italy squad for the World Rugby Nations Cup.
