= Lorenzo Masselli =

- Full name: Lorenzo Robin Masselli
- Born: 17 April 1997 (age 29) Johannesburg, South Africa
- Height: 1.98 m (6 ft 6 in)
- Weight: 108 kg (238 lb; 17 st 0 lb)

Rugby union career
- Position: Flanker
Youth career
- St John's College
Senior career
Years	Team	Apps	(Points)
2016	F.I.R. Academy		
2016−2019	Lyons Piacenza	15	(0)
2019−2021	Zebre	20	(5)
2019−2021	→Lyons Piacenza	14	(5)
- Correct as of 15 May 2021
International career
Years	Team	Apps	(Points)
2016–2017	Italy Under 20	17	(5)
- Correct as of 19 May 2020

Lorenzo Robin Masselli (born 17 April 1997 in Johannesburg) is a South African born, Italian rugby union player. His usual position is as a Flanker and he currently plays for Zebre in Pro14.

He played for Zebre in Pro14 from 2019 to 2021.

In 2016 and 2017, Masselli was named in the Italy Under 20 squad.

Masselli is now the assistant coach and forwards coach for Twickenham based team, Thamesians RFC.
