= Cameron Dawson (rugby union) =

South African rugby union player

- Full name: Cameron Douglas Dawson
- Born: 6 January 1999 (age 27) Cape Town, South Africa
- Height: 1.81 m (5 ft 11 1/2 in)
- Weight: 115 kg (254 lb)
- School: Paul Roos Gymnasium
- University: University of the Free State

Rugby union career
- Position: Prop
- Current team: Sharks
Youth career
- 2018: Free State Cheetahs
Senior career
Years	Team	Apps	(Points)
2019	Free State XV	3	(0)
2019–2020	Southern Kings	1	(0)
2020–2022	Cheetahs	5	(0)
2020–2022	Free State Cheetahs	59	(5)
2023–2024	Pumas	8	(5)
- Correct as of 13 March 2023

Cameron Dawson (born 6 January 1999) is a South African rugby union player for the Sharks in the Pro14. His regular position is prop.

Dawson made his Pro14 debut while for the Southern Kings in their match against the Cheetahs in February 2020, starting as prop. He signed for the Kings Pro14 side for the 2019–20 Pro14.

== Youth career ==
Cameron Douglas Dawson was educated at Paul Roos Gymnasium from 2013 to 2017 where he played over thirty five 1st team games for the schools First XV under 19 team over the 2016–2017 season. Cameron was announced as the first XV vice Captain in his final year (2017) after proving himself a valuable asset on the pitch in his 2016 season. Cameron was quickly identified as a possible asset for Western province rugby and was selected for the 2017 Craven Week training squad. Dawson however was not available for selection due to an injury. Cameron did however manage to lead his team to the number five spot in the 2017 National school boy rankings. Cameron was also ranked as the number 83 best overall schoolboy rugby player in the country at the conclusion of his high school rugby career in 2017.

Dawson was enrolled in the University of the Free State at age eighteen where he earned a spot in the 2018 under 20 Varsity Cup team where Cameron featured in the starting lineup in all six of their Varsity Cup fixtures.

Dawson made his junior debut for the Cheetahs in the 2018 under 19 junior Currie Cup and quickly became a regular, starting ten out the twelve matches missing only two due to injury.

Shortly after the conclusion of the 2018 Junior Currie Cup Cameron was called up to the under 21 Cheetahs Currie Cup side to play in the semi-finals against the Lions at Ellis Park Stadium where Dawson made his appearance off the bench.

Shortly after Dawson's stellar performance in the under 19 and under 21 Currie Cup in 2018 he was called up to the senior Varsity Cup team for the 2019 preseason. In January 2019 shortly before the start of the 2019 Varsity Cup Cameron was snatched up by the Cheetahs Super Sport Rugby Challenge team to join them in preparation of their 2019 campaign where he would later make his senior rugby debut.

== Senior career ==
After being called up to the Cheetahs Super Sport Rugby Challenge team (Free State XV) Cameron quickly made a name for himself playing off the bench and making a notable impact in both warm up games against Griquas and Griffons. Cameron earned himself the starting spot in the official Cheetahs Super Sport Rugby Challenge lineup and played a vital role in the victory over the Sharks in his senior debut match at FreeState Stadium.

Dawson went on to feature in the next two Super Sport Rugby Challenge fixtures vs Boland Cavaliers and EP Elephants after which he was bought by the Pro14 franchise Southern Kings cutting his 2019 Super Sport Rugby Challenge short.

Upon the arrival of the promising loose-Head prop at Southern Kings Dawson was thrown straight into the starting lineup in the Southern Kings pre season friendly against Georgian National Rugby Team in preparation of the 2019 Rugby World Cup and the impending 2019/2020 Pro14 season.

Dawson quickly became known for his strong set piece play and aggressive defense.

After an impressive performance against Georgian National Rugby Dawson joined Southern Kings for another two friendly clashes against Namibian National Rugby in Windhoek Namibia. During the second half of the first game Dawson sustained a foot injury that would keep him on the sidelines for the remainder of the 2019 Pro14 season.

Dawson was cleared to play in late January 2020 was thrown right back into the Southern Kings starting lineup against the Cheetahs on 1 February 2020 where he made his Pro14 debut.
