= Tiaan Botes =

South African rugby union player

- Full name: Tiaan Botes
- Born: 7 December 2001 (age 24) Vanderbijlpark, South Africa
- Height
- School: Helpmekaar Kollege

Rugby union career
- Position: Fly-half
- Current team: Pumas
Senior career
Years	Team	Apps	(Points)
2019–2020	Southern Kings	1	(0)
2020–2022	Pumas	4	(0)
- Correct as of 10 July 2022

Tiaan Botes (born 7 December 2001) is a South African professional rugby union player for the Southern Kings in the Pro14 . His regular position is fly-half.

Botes made his Pro14 debut while for the Southern Kings in their match against the Connacht in March 2020, as a replacement fly-half. He signed for the Kings Pro14 junior players side for the 2019–20 Pro14.
