= James McCarthy (rugby union) =

Welsh rugby union player

- Born: 5 January 1999 (age 27) Newport, Wales
- Height: 1.86 m (6 ft 1 in)
- Weight: 88 kg (13.9 st; 194 lb)
- School: Caerleon Comprehensive School; Newport High School

Rugby union career
- Position(s): Wing, Fullback
Amateur team(s)
| Years | Team | Apps | (Points) |
- UL Bohemians
| – | Cross Keys | | |
| – | Abu Dhabi Harlequins | | |
Senior career
| Years | Team | Apps | (Points) |
| 2019–2020 | Dragons | 0 | (0) |
| – | Munster Rugby | | |
International career
| Years | Team | Apps | (Points) |
- Wales U18 Schools
| – | Wales U18 | | |
| – | Ireland U20 | | |
National sevens team
| Years | Team | | Comps |
| | Wales Sevens | | 2 |

James McCarthy (born 5 January 1999) is a Welsh rugby union player who plays as a wing or fullback.

== Early life ==
McCarthy was born in Newport, Wales to an Irish father and a Welsh mother. He attended Caerleon Comprehensive School and Newport High School. He had been part of the Bristol Rovers academy and began playing rugby union aged 12, going on to represent Wales at under-18 schools level and scoring two tries in their win against Ireland under-18 schools in 2017, as well as being a member of the Newport Gwent Dragons academy.

== Move to Ireland ==
Following his performances in his native Wales, McCarthy, who had been identified through the Irish Exiles pathway, was contacted by the Irish Rugby Football Union, who offered him a place in Munster's academy. McCarthy spent two seasons with the province, featuring for their 'A' team on a number of occasions, and earning five caps for Ireland under-20s and playing against Wales, before opting to return to Wales in April 2019.

== Return to Wales ==
McCarthy rejoined Dragons upon his return to Wales, and was called up to the Wales Sevens squad in January 2020. Because McCarthy never played for Ireland Wolfhounds, Ireland's designated 'capture' team, he remained eligible for Wales selection. He was released by the Dragons at the end of the 2019–20 season.
