= Xandré Vos =

South African rugby union player

- Born: 30 September 1996 (age 30) Pretoria, South Africa
- Height: 1.77 m (5 ft 9 1/2 in)
- Weight: 110 kg (240 lb; 17 st 5 lb)
- School: Graeme College
- University: Nelson Mandela University

Rugby union career
- Position: Prop
- Current team: [Stade Langonnaise]
Youth career
- 2014–2017: Eastern Province Kings
Senior career
Years	Team	Apps	(Points)
2017–present	Eastern Province Elephants	24	(15)
2018–2020	Southern Kings	12	(0)
2021–present	C’Chartres Rugby	56	(20)
- Correct as of 1 July 2019

Xandré Vos (born 30 September 1996) is a South African rugby union player for the Stade Langonaise rugby club of Nationale 2. His regular position is prop.

He also played for the Southern Kings in the Pro14 and the Eastern Province Elephants in the Currie Cup and the Rugby Challenge.
