= Robin Stevens (rugby union) =

South African rugby union player

- Full name: Robin Stevens
- Born: 28 February 1996 (age 30) South Africa
- Height: 1.75 m (5 ft 9 in)
- Weight: 99 kg (218 lb)

Rugby union career
- Position: Hooker
- Current team: Eastern Province Elephants
Senior career
Years	Team	Apps	(Points)
2017	Eastern Province Elephants	2	(0)
2020	Southern Kings	1	(0)
2021–	Eastern Province Elephants	0	(0)
- Correct as of 27 March 2022

Robin Stevens (born 28 February 1996) is a South African rugby union player for the Southern Kings in the Pro14. His regular position is hooker.

He made his Pro14 debut while for the Southern Kings in their match against the Connacht in March 2020, coming on as a replacement hooker. Following the liquidation of the Southern Kings, Stevens signed for the Eastern Province Elephants ahead of the 2021 season.
