= Theo Maree =

South African rugby union player (born 1995)

- Full name: Theodorus Daniel Maree
- Born: 2 March 1995 (age 31) Tzaneen, South Africa
- Height: 1.81 m (5 ft 11 1/2 in)
- Weight: 79 kg (174 lb; 12 st 6 lb)
- School: Hoërskool Ben Vorster
- University: University of Pretoria

Rugby union career
- Position: Scrum-half
- Current team: Griquas
Youth career
- 2013: Limpopo Blue Bulls
- 2014–2016: Blue Bulls
Senior career
Years	Team	Apps	(Points)
2016–2019	Blue Bulls XV	18	(5)
2017	Pumas	3	(0)
2018	Blue Bulls	1	(0)
2019–2020	Southern Kings	5	(0)
2020–	Griquas	4	(0)
- Correct as of 3 March 2021

Theodorus Daniel Maree (born 2 March 1995) is a South African rugby union player for the Bulls in Super Rugby and the Blue Bulls XV in the Rugby Challenge. His regular position is scrum-half.
