= Gavin Mills =

South African rugby union player

- Born: 8 March 2000 (age 26)
- Height: 1.72 m (5 ft 7 1/2 in)
- Weight: 74 kg (163 lb)
- School: Hoër Landbouskool Boland

Rugby union career
- Position: Scrum-half
- Current team: Southern Kings
Senior career
Years	Team	Apps	(Points)
2019–2020	Southern Kings	1	(0)
- Correct as of 2 November 2019

Gavin Mills (born 8 March 2000) is a South African rugby union player for the Southern Kings in the Pro14. His regular position is scrum-half.

Mills attended and played first team rugby for Hoër Landbouskool Boland. He was contracted by the Port Elizabeth-based Pro14 franchise the Southern Kings prior to the 2019–20 season. He made his debut in their fifth match of the season, playing off the bench for the final five minutes in their defeat to the Glasgow Warriors in Scotland.
