= Erich Cronjé =

South African rugby union player

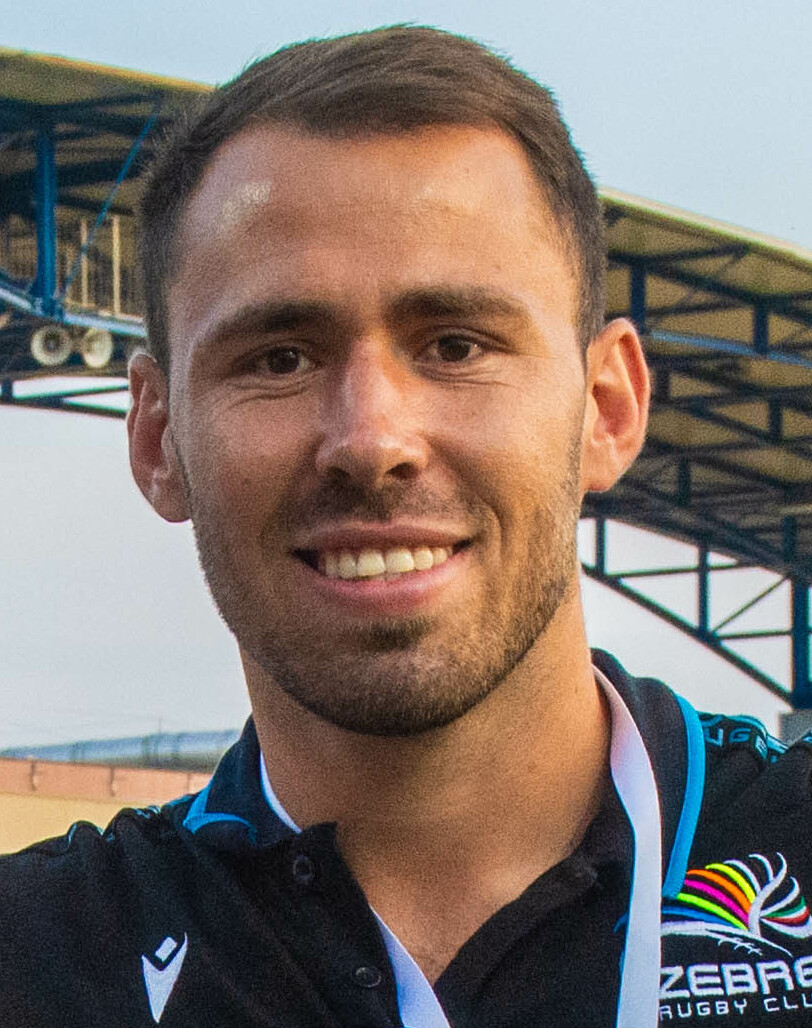
- Full name: Erich Cronjé
- Born: 1 January 1997 (age 29) South Africa
- Height: 1.84 m (6 ft 1/2 in)
- Weight: 95 kg (209 lb)

Rugby union career
- Position: Centre
- Current team: Lions
Youth career
- 2015−2017: Blue Bulls
Senior career
| Years | Team | Apps | (Points) |
| 2017–2019 | Blue Bulls XV | 5 | (15) |
| 2019–2020 | Southern Kings | 10 | (25) |
| 2020–2021 | Pumas | 17 | (30) |
| 2021–2023 | Zebre | 30 | (35) |
| 2023– | Lions | 43 | (50) |
| 2024– | Golden Lions | 1 | (5) |
- Correct as of 3 November 2026

Erich Cronjé (born 1 January 1997) is a South African rugby union player for the South African United Rugby Championship team Lions. His regular position is centre.

In 2019−2020 season Cronjé played with Southern Kings in the Pro14 . He made his Pro14 debut while for the Southern Kings in their match against the Benetton in October 2019, as a replacement centre. He signed for the Kings Pro14 side only for the 2019–20 Pro14. After the disbanded of the team, he signed with Pumas until 2021 in order to play Super Rugby Unlocked and Currie Cup. From 2021 to 2023 he played for the Italian United Rugby Championship team Zebre Parma.
