= Luyolo Dapula =

South African rugby union player

- Full name: Luyolo Dapula
- Born: 10 October 1998 (age 28) South Africa
- Height: 1.91 m (6 ft 3 in)
- Weight: 109 kg (240 lb)
- School: Queen's College Boys' High School
- University: Nelson Mandela University

Rugby union career
- Position: Flanker
- Current team: Griquas
Senior career
Years	Team	Apps	(Points)
2019	Cheetahs XV	6	(0)
2020	Southern Kings	1	(0)
2021–	Griquas	5	(0)
- Correct as of 10 July 2022

Luyolo Dapula (born 10 October 1998) is a South African rugby union player for the Griquas in the Currie Cup. His regular position is flanker.

Dapula made his Pro14 debut while for the Southern Kings in their match against the Munster in February 2020, coming on as a replacement flanker.
