= Brandon Brown (rugby union) =

South African rugby union player

- Full name: Henry Brandon Brown
- Born: 16 November 1994 (age 32) Port Elizabeth, South Africa
- Height: 1.85 m (6 ft 1 in)
- Weight: 102 kg (225 lb; 16 st 1 lb)
- School: Grey High School
- University: Nelson Mandela Metropolitan University

Rugby union career
- Position: Flanker
- Current team: Southern Kings
Youth career
- 2015: Eastern Province Kings
Amateur team(s)
Years	Team	Apps	(Points)
2016	NMMU Madibaz	7	(10)
Senior career
Years	Team	Apps	(Points)
2016–2018	Eastern Province Elephants	22	(35)
2018–present	Southern Kings	8	(0)
- Correct as of 4 May 2019

Henry Brandon Brown (born 16 November 1994) is a South African rugby union player for the Southern Kings in the Pro14. His regular position is flanker and he can also play as a lock.

== Rugby career ==
=== Youth rugby ===
Brown was born in Port Elizabeth. He attended and played first team rugby for Grey High School, but didn't play at provincial for his local side, the Eastern Province Kings, at school-level competitions such as the Under-18 Craven Week.

His first taste of rugby played at a nationwide level was for the Eastern Province U21 team during the 2015 Under-21 Provincial Championship. He made eight starts and three appearances as a replacement for the team playing in their first season in Group A of the competition, having won promotion from Group B in 2014. The team struggled in their first season at a higher level, winning just one match and finishing bottom of the log.

=== 2016: NMMU Madibaz / Eastern Province Kings ===
In 2016, Brown represented the NMMU Madibaz in the Varsity Cup competition. He played in all seven of their matches during the competition – starting six of those – and scored tries in matches against NWU Pukke and against the UCT Ikey Tigers in their only victory of the season as the team finished second-last in the competition.

Brown was included in the Eastern Province Kings matchday squad for their Currie Cup qualification series match against the Falcons in Kemnpton Park. He made his first class debut by coming on just before the hour mark in a 26–59 defeat in his only appearances in the competition.

He was named in their squad for the 2016 Currie Cup Premier Division and made his first appearance at this level, appearing as a replacement in their 10–28 defeat to the Boland Cavaliers in their opening match of the season. After another appearance off the bench against Western Province, he made his first start against Griquas four days later. He featured in all their remaining matches in the competition in a poor season for the team that saw the side finish bottom, losing all their matches. Brown scored his first senior try during the season, in their final round defeat to the Pumas.

== Water polo ==
In addition to playing rugby union, Brown also played water polo in high school, earning an inclusion in a South Africa Under-19 team following a national competition held in Port Elizabeth.

One of his team mates at Grey High School was fellow future provincial rugby union player Jeremy Ward.
