= De-Jay Terblanche =

South African rugby union player

- Born: 25 June 1985 (age 41) Knysna, South Africa
- Height: 1.86 m (6 ft 1 in)
- Weight: 125 kg (19 st 10 lb; 276 lb)
- School: Knysna High School

Rugby union career
- Position: Prop
- Current team: Pumas
Senior career
Years	Team	Apps	(Points)
2008–present	Pumas	198	(70)
2016	→ Mont-de-Marsan	4	(0)
2019	→ Southern Kings	8	(0)
- Correct as of 8 September 2019

De-Jay Terblanche (born 25 June 1985) is a South African rugby union footballer for the Pumas in the Currie Cup and in the Rugby Challenge. He plays mostly as a prop.

He was a member of the Pumas side that won the Vodacom Cup for the first time in 2015, beating Western Province 24–7 in the final. Terblanche made eight appearances during the season.

He joined French Pro D2 side Mont-de-Marsan on a three-month loan deal at the start of 2016.
