= Rossouw de Klerk =

South African rugby union player

- Full name: Pieter Rossouw de Klerk
- Born: 21 August 1989 (age 37) Vredenburg, South Africa
- Height: 1.86 m (6 ft 1 in)
- Weight: 118 kg (260 lb; 18 st 8 lb)
- School: Paarl Gimnasium

Rugby union career
- Position: Tighthead Prop
- Current team: Southern Kings
Youth career
- 2005: Western Province
Amateur team(s)
Years	Team	Apps	(Points)
2009	UP Tuks	2	(0)
Senior career
Years	Team	Apps	(Points)
2009–2012	Blue Bulls	33	(0)
2010–2012	Bulls	14	(0)
2013–2014	Free State XV	8	(5)
2013–2014	Free State Cheetahs	7	(0)
2013	→ Griffons	1	(0)
2014	Cheetahs	7	(0)
2014–2015	Glasgow Warriors	17	(5)
2015–2017	Grenoble	29	(10)
2017	Colomiers	8	(0)
2017–present	Southern Kings	15	(0)
- Correct as of 17 February 2019

Pieter Rossouw de Klerk (born 21 August 1989) is a South African rugby union player for the Southern Kings in the Pro14. His regular playing position is tighthead prop.

De Klerk began his senior career in Pretoria and made his domestic debut for the Blue Bulls in 2009 against the Griquas. The following year he made his first Super Rugby appearance for the Bulls against the Highlanders. In total he managed 33 matches for the Blue Bulls and 14 games for the Bulls.

He moved west in 2013 and played for the Free State Cheetahs in the Vodacom Cup and Currie Cup competitions.

He signed for Glasgow Warriors in 2014 and won the Pro 12 title in the season 2014-15. On 31 July 2015 Glasgow Warriors announced that De Klerk would be released from his contract for personal reasons. On 27 September 2015, Klerk signed for top French club Grenoble in the Top 14 from the 2015–2016 season.
