= Eddie Ludick =

South African rugby union player

- Full name: Edmund Ludick
- Born: 25 January 1999 (age 27) South Africa
- Height: 1.86 m (6 ft 1 in)
- Weight: 95 kg (209 lb)

Rugby union career
- Position: Centre / Wing
Senior career
Years	Team	Apps	(Points)
2020	Southern Kings	2	(0)
- Correct as of 18 January 2021

Eddie Ludick (born 25 January 1999) is a South African rugby union player for the Southern Kings in the Pro14. His regular position is centre or wing.

Ludick made his Pro14 debut while for the Southern Kings in their match against the Munster in February 2020, coming on as a replacement flanker.
