= Michael Botha =

South African rugby union player

- Full name: Michael Barry Botha
- Born: 28 May 1997 (age 29) Margate, South Africa
- Height: 1.81 m (5 ft 11 1/2 in)
- Weight: 86 kg (190 lb; 13 st 8 lb)
- School: Selborne College

Rugby union career
- Position: Fullback
- Current team: Eastern Province Elephants
Youth career
- 2015: Border Bulldogs
- 2015–2018: Eastern Province Elephants
Senior career
| Years | Team | Apps | (Points) |
| 2018–present | Eastern Province Elephants | 7 | (27) |
| 2018–2020 | Southern Kings | 4 | (5) |
- Correct as of 1 July 2019

Michael Barry Botha (born 28 May 1997) is a South African professional rugby union player who currently plays for the Southern Kings in the Pro14 and the Eastern Province Elephants in the Currie Cup and the Rugby Challenge. His regular position is fullback.
