= Jerry Sexton (rugby union) =

- Full name: Jeremiah Sexton
- Born: 20 January 1993 (age 33) Dublin, Ireland
- Height: 1.95 m (6 ft 5 in)
- Weight: 118 kg (260 lb)
- School: St Mary's College
- Notable relative: Johnny Sexton (brother)

Rugby union career
- Position: Lock
- Current team: Doncaster Knights
Amateur team(s)
Years	Team	Apps	(Points)
- St Mary's
Senior career
Years	Team	Apps	(Points)
2013–2014	Auch Gers	0	(0)
2014–2016	Exeter Chiefs	6	(0)
2015–2017	London Irish	25	(5)
2017–2019	Jersey Reds	49	(35)
2019–2020	Southern Kings	12	(0)
2020–	Doncaster Knights	12	(0)
- Correct as of 15 April 2021
International career
Years	Team	Apps	(Points)
2013	Ireland U20	1	(5)
- Correct as of 29 March 2020

Jeremiah Sexton (born 20 January 1993) is a professional rugby union player from Ireland for English side the Doncaster Knights in the RFU Championship. Sexton primarily plays as a lock. He is the younger brother of Irish international player Johnny Sexton.

Sexton represented Leinster Rugby at schoolboy level but did not make the professional academy. He moved to France in 2013, playing for Auch Gers in French rugby's second-tier competition the Pro D2. After one season with the French outfit, Sexton moved to the English Premiership, joining the Exeter Chiefs in 2014. He made his senior debut for Exeter Chiefs in the LV Cup against Gloucester in November 2014. In February 2016, he joined London Irish on loan for the remainder of the 2015–16 season.

It was announced in July 2017 that Sexton would leave London Irish and sign for Jersey Reds from the 2017–18 season. After two seasons at the club, Sexton left the English Championship side to join South African Pro14 side Southern Kings on a three-year contract ahead of the 2019–20 season.; he would return to Europe from South Africa a year early however following the liquidation of the Kings at the end of 2019–20, signing for Doncaster Knights ahead of the 2020–21 RFU Championship season.
