= Josiah Twum-Boafo =

South African rugby union player

- Born: 23 July 1997 (age 29) Accra, Ghana
- Height: 1.83 m (6 ft 0 in)
- Weight: 101 kg (223 lb)
- School: Grey High School, Port Elizabeth

Rugby union career
- Position: Centre / Wing
- Current team: Eastern Province Elephants
Youth career
- 2014–2017: Eastern Province Kings
Senior career
Years	Team	Apps	(Points)
2019–2020	Southern Kings	5	(0)
2022–	Eastern Province Elephants		
- Correct as of 29 March 2022

Josiah Twum-Boafo (born 23 July 1997) is a South African rugby union player for the Southern Kings in the Pro14. His regular position is centre or wing.

Twum-Boafo was born in Butterworth to a Ghanaian father and a mother from Trinidad and Tobago. He matriculated at Grey High School in Port Elizabeth and represented the local provincial side the Eastern Province Kings at various age-groups.

In 2019, Twum-Boafo was contracted by the Southern Kings Pro14 franchise and he made his first class debut in October 2019, coming on as a replacement in their match against Munster and making his first start the following week against Ulster.
