= Chris Hollis =

South African rugby union player

- Full name: Christopher Hollis
- Born: 24 June 1998 (age 28) Tarkastad, South Africa
- Height: 1.92 m (6 ft 3 1/2 in)
- Weight: 107 kg (236 lb)
- School: Queen's College, Queenstown
- University: Nelson Mandela University

Rugby union career
- Position: Centre / Wing
- Current team: Stormers
Youth career
- 2016: Border Bulldogs
- 2017–2018: Blue Bulls
Senior career
Years	Team	Apps	(Points)
2019–2020	Southern Kings	8	(10)
2021–2022	Griquas	15	(15)
2021–2022	Lions	0	(0)
2022–	Stormers		
- Correct as of 16 September 2022

Christopher Hollis (born 24 June 1998) is a South African rugby union player who plays as a centre or wing for the Stormers in the United Rugby Championship. He has previously played for the Southern Kings, Griquas, and Lions.

== Early life and youth rugby ==
Hollis was born in Tarkastad, South Africa. He attended Queen's College in Queenstown, where he played first-team rugby and was selected for Border's U18 squad for the 2016 Craven Week tournament held in Durban.

Following his school career, Hollis joined the Blue Bulls academy in Pretoria, where he represented their youth teams in 2017 and 2018.

== Professional career ==
=== Southern Kings (2019–2020) ===
In 2019, Hollis played for the NMU Madibaz in the Varsity Cup before being signed by the Pro14 side Southern Kings.

He made his professional debut in the opening round of the 2019–20 Pro14 season, starting in the Southern Kings' 27–31 defeat to Cardiff Blues. He scored his first senior try a month later in a 30–36 loss against Benetton.

=== Griquas & Lions (2021–2022) ===
After the dissolution of the Southern Kings, Hollis joined Griquas in 2021, playing in the Currie Cup Premier Division. He made 15 appearances for the side, scoring 15 points. He was also briefly affiliated with the Lions but did not make an official appearance.

=== Stormers (2022–present) ===
In 2022, Hollis signed with the Stormers in the United Rugby Championship.

== Career statistics ==
Senior Career Statistics
Season	Team	Competition	Appearances	Points
2019–2020	Southern Kings	Pro14	8	10
2021–2022	Griquas	Currie Cup Premier Division	15	15
2021–2022	Lions	United Rugby Championship	0	0
2022 – present	Stormers	United Rugby Championship	TBD	TBD
