= JC Astle =

South African rugby union player

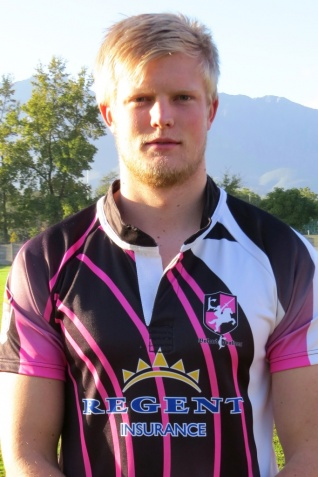
- Full name: John-Charles Astle
- Born: 30 August 1990 (age 36) Queenstown, South Africa
- Height: 1.98 m (6 ft 6 in)
- Weight: 110 kg (240 lb; 17 st 5 lb)
- School: Pionier High School, Vryheid
- University: University of the Free State

Rugby union career
- Position: Lock
- Current team: Southern Kings
Youth career
- 2008: Sharks
- 2009–2011: Free State Cheetahs
Amateur team(s)
Years	Team	Apps	(Points)
2012–2013	UFS Shimlas	12	(20)
Senior career
Years	Team	Apps	(Points)
2010–2011	Free State Cheetahs	12	(0)
2012	Free State XV	4	(0)
2013–2014	Boland Cavaliers	25	(10)
2014–2016	Sharks (Currie Cup)	12	(0)
2015	Sharks XV	4	(0)
2016	Southern Kings	15	(0)
2016–2018	Mont-de-Marsan	36	(0)
2018–2020	Southern Kings	29	(0)
2020–2026	Rouen	96	(20)
- Correct as of 5 March 2026

John-Charles Astle (born 30 August 1990) is a South African rugby union player for the Southern Kings in the Pro14. His regular position is lock.

== Career ==
After playing for the Sharks at the 2008 Under–18 Craven Week competition, he joined the Free State Cheetahs. He represented them at Under–19 level in 2009 and at Under–21 in 2010 and 2011.

In 2010, he was also included in their Vodacom Cup squad and he made his first class debut against Western Province. He made 16 appearances for them in the Vodacom Cup, but failed to break into their Currie Cup squad and subsequently joined the Boland Cavaliers prior to the 2013 Currie Cup First Division season.

He was released by the Sharks in November 2015.

He also played for UFS Shimlas in the 2012 and 2013 Varsity Cup competitions.

He joined French Pro D2 side Mont-de-Marsan during the 2016–17 season.
