= Aston Fortuin =

South African rugby union player

- Full name: Aston Brad Fortuin
- Born: 16 April 1996 (age 30) Cape Town, South Africa
- Height: 1.97 m (6 ft 5 1/2 in)
- Weight: 114 kg (251 lb; 17 st 13 lb)
- School: Southdowns College
- University: University of Pretoria

Rugby union career
- Position: Lock
- Current team: Utah Warriors
Youth career
- 2012: Border Bulldogs
- 2013–2017: Blue Bulls
Amateur team(s)
Years	Team	Apps	(Points)
2016–2017	UP Tuks		
Senior career
Years	Team	Apps	(Points)
2016–2019	Blue Bulls XV	29	(5)
2017	Blue Bulls	7	(5)
2019–2020	Southern Kings	11	(5)
2020–2021	Sharks (Currie Cup)	3	(0)
2021–	Utah Warriors		
- Correct as of 28 April 2021
International career
Years	Team	Apps	(Points)
2014	South Africa Schools		
- Correct as of 13 April 2018

Aston Brad Fortuin (born 16 April 1996) is a South African rugby union player for the Utah Warriors of Major League Rugby (MLR) in the United States. His regular position is lock.

Fortuin previously played for the Southern Kings in the Pro14.
