= 2019–20 Pro14 =

- Countries: Ireland; Italy; Scotland; South Africa; Wales
- Date: 27 September 2019 – 12 September 2020
- Champions: Leinster (7th title)
- Runners-up: Ulster
- Matches played: 89
- Attendance: 652,443 (average 7,331 per match)
- Highest attendance: 27,437; Edinburgh v Glasgow (28 December 2019)
- Lowest attendance: 1,500; Southern Kings v Connacht (1 March 2020)
- Top point scorer: (Ireland) JJ Hanrahan (Munster); 101 points
- Top try scorer: (South Africa) Rhyno Smith (Cheetahs); 10 tries

Official website
- www.pro14rugby.org

The 2019–20 PRO14 (also known as the Guinness PRO14 for sponsorship reasons) was the nineteenth season of the professional rugby union competition originally known as the Celtic League. It was the third season to be referred to as the PRO14 (the competition was named the Pro12 immediately prior to the addition of two South African teams).

Fourteen teams competed in this season — four Irish teams: Connacht, Leinster, Munster and Ulster; two Italian teams: Benetton and Zebre; two Scottish teams: Edinburgh and Glasgow Warriors; two South African teams: Cheetahs and the Southern Kings; and four Welsh teams: Cardiff Blues, Dragons, Ospreys and Scarlets.

On 12 March 2020, the season was suspended due to the COVID-19 pandemic. It restarted on 22 August in a truncated format.

It was won by Leinster, their third consecutive Pro14 title, and the second occasion on which they had achieved a Perfect season by winning every match - a feat achieved by no other team in the competition's history.

== Teams ==
| Location of Irish, Scottish and Welsh teams: | Location of Italian teams: Location of South African teams: |
Conference A; Conference B.

| Team | Coach / Director of Rugby | Captain | Stadium/ Stadia | Capacity |
|---|---|---|---|---|
| (Italy) Benetton | (New Zealand) Kieran Crowley | (Italy) Dean Budd | Stadio Comunale di Monigo, Treviso | 6,700 |
| (Wales) Cardiff Blues | (Australia) John Mulvihill | (Wales) Ellis Jenkins | Cardiff Arms Park (Note: Cardiff Blues will also play a home game at Rodney Parade.) | 12,125 |
| (South Africa) Cheetahs | (South Africa) Franco Smith (South Africa) Hawies Fourie | (South Africa) Tian Meyer | Free State Stadium | 48,000 |
| (Ireland) Connacht | (Australia) Andy Friend | (Australia) Jarrad Butler | Galway Sportsgrounds (Note: Connacht will also play a home game at the Aviva Stadium) | 8,129 |
| (Wales) Dragons | (England) Dean Ryan | (Wales) Cory Hill | Rodney Parade | 8,700 |
| (Scotland) Edinburgh | (England) Richard Cockerill | (Scotland) Stuart McInally | Murrayfield Stadium | 67,144 (Note: Although Murrayfield's full capacity is 67,144, only the lower section of the East Stand, with a capacity of 12,464, is generally opened for Edinburgh fixtures.) |
| (Scotland) Glasgow Warriors | (New Zealand) Dave Rennie | (New Zealand) Callum Gibbins (Scotland) Ryan Wilson | Scotstoun Stadium (Note: Glasgow Warriors will also play a home game at Murrayfield.) | 7,351 |
| (Ireland) Leinster | (Ireland) Leo Cullen | (Ireland) Johnny Sexton | RDS Arena; Aviva Stadium | 18,500; 51,700 |
| (Ireland) Munster | (South Africa) Johann van Graan | (Ireland) Peter O'Mahony | Thomond Park; Irish Independent Park (Note: Munster will also play a home game at the Aviva Stadium) | 25,600 (Note: Thomond Park's official capacity is 25,600 but can be expanded up to 26,276 with temporary seating.); 8,008 |
| (Wales) Ospreys | (Ireland) Allen Clarke | (Wales) Justin Tipuric | Liberty Stadium (Note: Osprey's would also play several games at the 6,000 capacity The Gnoll in Neath.) | 20,827 |
| (Wales) Scarlets | (New Zealand) Brad Mooar (New Zealand) Glenn Delaney | (Wales) Ken Owens | Parc y Scarlets | 14,870 |
| (South Africa) Southern Kings | (South Africa) Robbi Kempson (interim) | (South Africa) JC Astle | Nelson Mandela Bay Stadium | 48,459 |
| (Ireland) Ulster | (England) Dan McFarland | (Ireland) Iain Henderson | Kingspan Stadium (Note: Ulster will also play a home game at the Aviva Stadium) | 18,196 |
| (Italy) Zebre | (Ireland) Michael Bradley | (Italy) Tommaso Castello | Stadio Sergio Lanfranchi (Note: Zebre would also play a game at the 5,000 capacity Stadio Giovanni Mari in Legnano.) | 5,000 |

== Competition format ==
League Stage

The fourteen teams are split into two conferences of seven teams, with each conference featuring two teams from Ireland and Wales plus one team from Italy, Scotland and South Africa. To ensure a competitive balance, the teams are distributed approximately evenly between the conferences based upon their performance in the previous season.

The regular season was due to be made up of 21 rounds. The original schedule was planned as follows –
6 home and 6 away games against each team in their own conference
7 games, either home or away, against the teams in the other conference
2 additional regional derbies

- Each Irish team plays the two Irish teams in the other conference, one at home and one away
- Each Welsh team plays the two Welsh teams in the other conference, one at home and one away
- The two Italian teams play each other twice, home and away
- The two Scottish teams play each other twice, home and away
- The two South African teams play each other twice, home and away

=== Impact of COVID-19 Pandemic ===
All teams played their normal schedule until round 13 after which an additional two rounds of derby matches were played by the 12 European teams. The Southern Kings announced in August 2020 that they had voluntarily withdrawn from the league for the remainder of 2020 and therefore there will not be South African derbies.

League Play-Offs

The first and second placed teams in each conferences will meet in the semi-finals. The winners of the semi-finals will then meet in the grand final.

Champions Cup Qualification

The top four eligible European teams in both conferences automatically qualify for the 2020–21 European Rugby Champions Cup. (The South African teams do not compete in the Champions Cup.) Qualification is based on league position after round 13.

== Team changes ==
=== Ireland ===
Connacht underwent a rebranding during the off-season, updating their team crest in the process. During the course of the season, the planned redevelopment of the Sportsground was boosted by the commitment of €20 million from the Irish government.

Leinster's highest profile departure in the off-season was Seán O'Brien, who made over 100 appearances and was the side's former vice-captain. With captain Johnny Sexton and vice-captain Rhys Ruddock missing the start of the season due to the World Cup, Scott Fardy served as team captain in the opening rounds.

Munster's backs coach Felix Jones and forwards coach Jerry Flannery left the province when their contracts expired in June 2019. Former attack coach for the Australian national team, Stephen Larkham, was signed by the province as a senior coach ahead of the season, while Graham Rowntree joined as their new forwards coach after the completion of his duties with Georgia at the World Cup. The team's regular captain, Peter O'Mahony, missed the opening rounds of the tournament due to the World Cup, during which time Billy Holland captained the side.

Long-serving Ulster captain Rory Best announced in April 2019 that he would retire from rugby after the 2019 Rugby World Cup. Iain Henderson replaced Best as captain. With Henderson unavailable in the opening rounds due to the World Cup, the side was captained by Rob Herring. Herring was later called up to the World Cup as an injury replacement, and the captaincy went to Billy Burns.

=== South Africa ===
Cheetahs announced in June 2019 that Hawies Fourie had replaced Franco Smith as their head coach.

=== Wales ===
Then-Crusaders assistant coach Brad Mooar was confirmed as Wayne Pivac's replacement as Scarlets head coach in December 2018, with Pivac leaving the region to take over from Warren Gatland as Wales' head coach after the 2019 Rugby World Cup. Scarlets also appointed then-Highlanders defence coach and former London Irish head coach Glenn Delaney as their new defence coach, replacing the outgoing Byron Hayward.

Dragons announced the departure of head coach Bernard Jackman in December 2018, with Ceri Jones replacing Jackman on an interim basis for the remainder of the 2018–19 season, before the region confirmed in May 2019 that Dean Ryan would join in the newly created director of rugby position.

== Table ==
2019–20 Pro14 table
Conference A
| | Team | P | W | D | L | PF | PA | PD | TF | TA | TBP | LBP | PTS |
| 1 | (Ireland) Leinster (CH) | 15 | 15 | 0 | 0 | 531 | 216 | +315 | 74 | 28 | 9 | 0 | 69 |
| 2 | (Ireland) Ulster (RU) | 15 | 8 | 1 | 6 | 385 | 306 | +79 | 50 | 40 | 7 | 3 | 44 (Note: Ulster deducted 1 point for administration error regarding Ian Madigan.) |
| 3 | (Scotland) Glasgow Warriors | 15 | 8 | 0 | 7 | 364 | 329 | +35 | 53 | 42 | 5 | 1 | 38 |
| 4 | (South Africa) Cheetahs | 13 | 6 | 0 | 7 | 342 | 280 | +62 | 48 | 32 | 5 | 2 | 32 |
| 5 | (Wales) Dragons | 15 | 5 | 1 | 9 | 283 | 415 | –132 | 32 | 49 | 1 | 1 | 24 |
| 6 | (Italy) Zebre | 15 | 3 | 1 | 11 | 230 | 399 | –169 | 29 | 56 | 4 | 3 | 21 |
| 7 | (Wales) Ospreys | 15 | 2 | 2 | 11 | 205 | 375 | –170 | 21 | 45 | 1 | 4 | 17 |
Conference B
| | Team | P | W | D | L | PF | PA | PD | TF | TA | TBP | LBP | PTS |
| 1 | (Scotland) Edinburgh (SF) | 15 | 11 | 0 | 4 | 391 | 225 | +166 | 47 | 27 | 5 | 2 | 51 |
| 2 | (Ireland) Munster (SF) | 15 | 10 | 0 | 5 | 426 | 255 | +171 | 53 | 26 | 8 | 3 | 51 |
| 3 | (Wales) Scarlets | 15 | 10 | 0 | 5 | 354 | 274 | +80 | 46 | 34 | 5 | 2 | 47 |
| 4 | (Ireland) Connacht | 15 | 8 | 0 | 7 | 302 | 360 | –58 | 41 | 48 | 7 | 1 | 40 |
| 5 | (Italy) Benetton | 15 | 6 | 1 | 8 | 309 | 350 | –41 | 35 | 42 | 5 | 5 | 36 |
| 6 | (Wales) Cardiff Blues | 15 | 7 | 0 | 8 | 283 | 327 | –44 | 30 | 38 | 3 | 2 | 33 |
| 7 | (South Africa) Southern Kings | 13 | 1 | 0 | 12 | 204 | 498 | –294 | 23 | 75 | 0 | 3 | 7 |
If teams are level at any stage, tiebreakers are applied in the following order -: 1. number of matches won 2. the difference between points for and points against 3. the number of tries scored 4. the most points scored 5. the difference between tries for and tries against 6. the fewest red cards received 7. the fewest yellow cards received
Green background indicates teams that compete in the Pro14 play-offs, and also earn a place in the 2020–21 European Champions Cup Blue background indicates teams outside the play-off places that earn a place in the 2020–21 European Champions Cup; Red background indicates teams ineligible for European cup tournaments Plain background indicates teams that earn a place in the 2020–21 European Rugby Challenge Cup. (CH) Champions. (RU) Runners-up. (SF) Losing semi-finalists. (Q) Qualified for Pro14 play-off semi-finals. (e) Cannot reach play-offs.

== Conference Rounds 1 to 13 ==
All times are local.

=== Round 1 ===
27 September 2019
19:05

| (1 BP) Cheetahs (South Africa) | 48–14 | (Scotland) Glasgow Warriors |
| Try: Pienaar 5' c Dweba 20' c, 33' c Small-Smith 52' c, 63' c Pokomela 60' m Koen 69' m Con: Pienaar (5/7) 6', 21', 34', 53', 64'; Pen: Pienaar (1/1) 9' | Report | Try: Frisby 28' c Nairn 50' c Con: Thompson (2/2) 29', 50' |

Free State Stadium
Attendance: 4,528
Referee: Daniel Jones

27 September 2019
19:35

| (1 BP) Ulster (Ireland) | 38–14 | (Wales) Ospreys |
| Try: Gilroy 13' c, 50' c Jones 30' c Faddes 39' c Penalty Try 71'; Con: Cooney (4/4) 14', 31' 40+1, 51'; Pen: Cooney (1/1) 46' | Report | Try: Evans 7' m Pen: Price (3/3) 4', 22', 37' |

Kingspan Stadium
Attendance: 12,408
Referee: Marius Mitrea

28 September 2019
15:00

| (1 BP) Munster (Ireland) | 39–9 | (Wales) Dragons |
| | Report |

Thomond Park
Attendance: 10,878
Referee: Ben Blain

28 September 2019
16:00

| (1 BP) Southern Kings (South Africa) | 27–31 | (Wales) Cardiff Blues (1 BP) |
| | Report |

Nelson Mandela Bay Stadium
Attendance: 2,077
Referee: Mike Adamson

28 September 2019
17:15

| Scarlets (Wales) | 18–10 | (Ireland) Connacht |
| | Report |

Parc y Scarlets
Attendance: 6,415
Referee: Stuart Berry

28 September 2019
17:35

| (1 BP) Benetton (Italy) | 27–32 | (Ireland) Leinster (1BP) |
| | Report |

Stadio Comunale di Monigo
Attendance: 3,695
Referee: Ben Whitehouse

28 September 2019
19:35

| (1 BP) Edinburgh (Scotland) | 50–15 | (Italy) Zebre |
| | Report |

Murrayfield Stadium
Attendance: 4,221
Referee: George Clancy

=== Round 2 ===
4 October 2019
19:35

| (1 BP) Glasgow Warriors (Scotland) | 21–25 | (Wales) Scarlets |
| | Report |

Scotstoun Stadium
Attendance: 6,897
Referee: George Clancy

4 October 2019
19:35

| (1 BP) Leinster (Ireland) | 53–5 | (Wales) Ospreys |
| | Report |

RDS Arena
Attendance: 11,259
Referee: Stuart Berry

5 October 2019
15:00

| Southern Kings (South Africa) | 20–31 | (Ireland) Munster (1 BP) |
| | Report |

Nelson Mandela Bay Stadium
Attendance: 3,115
Referee: Daniel Jones

5 October 2019
17:35

| Cardiff Blues (Wales) | 11–19 | (Scotland) Edinburgh |
| | Report |

Cardiff Arms Park
Attendance: 5,190
Referee: Frank Murphy

5 October 2019
17:00

| (1 BP) Zebre (Italy) | 28–52 | (Wales) Dragons (1 BP) |
| | Report |

Stadio Sergio Lanfranchi
Attendance: 2,100
Referee: Sean Gallagher

5 October 2019
17:15

| (1 BP) Cheetahs (South Africa) | 63–26 | (Ireland) Ulster (1 BP) |
| Try: Volmink (3) 8' c 21' c 42' c Smith (2) 27' c 45' c Dweba 36' c Fouche 49' c Venter 68' c Con: Pienaar (6) 9' 22' 29' 38' 43' 46'; Schoeman 50' 69' | Report; Highlights | Try: Carter 25' c Hume 58' c Shanahan 63'; Gilroy 79' c Con: Cooney 26'; Johnston (2) 58' 80' |

Free State Stadium
Attendance: 4,582
Referee: Ian Davies

5 October 2019
19:35

| (1 BP) Connacht (Ireland) | 41–5 | (Italy) Benetton |
| | Report |

Galway Sportsgrounds
Attendance: 4,839
Referee: Rasta Rasivhenge

=== Round 3 ===
11 October 2019
18:15

| (1 BP) Cheetahs (South Africa) | 40–16 | (Ireland) Munster |
| | Report |

Free State Stadium
Attendance: 4,814
Referee: Mike Adamson

11 October 2019
19:35

| Dragons (Wales) | 14–38 | (Ireland) Connacht (1 BP) |
| | Report |

Rodney Parade
Attendance: 3,257
Referee: Marius Mitrea

11 October 2019
19:35

| (1 BP) Leinster (Ireland) | 40–14 | (Scotland) Edinburgh |
| | Report |

RDS Arena
Attendance: 12,712
Referee: Ben Whitehouse

12 October 2019
15:00

| (1 BP) Scarlets (Wales) | 54–10 | (Italy) Zebre |
| | Report |

Parc y Scarlets
Attendance: 6,424
Referee: Rasta Rasivhenge

12 October 2019
15:00

| Southern Kings (South Africa) | 17–42 | (Ireland) Ulster (1 BP) |
| Try: Kruger 37' c Fortuin 68' c Con: Catrakilis 37'; Jackson 68'; Pen: Catrakilis 7' | Report; Highlights | Try: Cooney (2) 1' c 31' c Marshall 13' c Herring 16' c Faddes 29' c Reidy 58' c Con: Cooney (6) 2' 14' 17' 30' 32' 59' |

Nelson Mandela Bay Stadium
Attendance: 2,807
Referee: Craig Evans

12 October 2019
19:35

| Glasgow Warriors (Scotland) | 17–13 | (Wales) Cardiff Blues (1 BP) |
| | Report |

Scotstoun Stadium
Attendance: 6,708
Referee: Sean Gallagher

12 October 2019
19:35

| (1 BP) Ospreys (Wales) | 24–20 | (Italy) Benetton (1 BP) |
| | Report |

Liberty Stadium
Attendance: 5,670
Referee: Frank Murphy

=== Round 4 ===
25 October 2019
19:35

| (1 BP) Munster (Ireland) | 28–12 | (Wales) Ospreys |
| | Report |

Irish Independent Park
Attendance: 7,311
Referee: Stuart Berry

25 October 2019
19:35

| Ulster (Ireland) | 23–14 | (Wales) Cardiff Blues |
| Try: Marshall 2' c Burns 19'c Con: Cooney (2) 3' 20'; Pen: Cooney (3) 8' 45' 62' | Report; Highlights | Try: Summerhill 42' c Boyde 56' c Con: Evans (2) 43' 57' |

Kingspan Stadium
Attendance: 12,250
Referee: Mike Adamson

26 October 2019
15:00

| Dragons (Wales) | 18–5 | (Scotland) Glasgow Warriors |
| | Report |

Rodney Parade
Attendance: 3,673
Referee: George Clancy

26 October 2019
15:00

| (1 BP) Benetton (Italy) | 36–30 | (South Africa) Southern Kings (1 BP) |
| | Report |

Stadio Comunale di Monigo
Attendance: 3,694
Referee: Daniel Jones

26 October 2019
17:15

| (1 BP) Connacht (Ireland) | 24–22 | (South Africa) Cheetahs (1 BP) |
| | Report |

Galway Sportsgrounds
Attendance: 4,945
Referee: Ben Whitehouse

26 October 2019
17:15

| (1 BP) Zebre (Italy) | 0–3 | (Ireland) Leinster |
| | Report |

Stadio Sergio Lanfranchi
Attendance: 2,500
Referee: Craig Evans

26 October 2019
19:35

| (1 BP) Edinburgh (Scotland) | 46–7 | (Wales) Scarlets |
| | Report |

Murrayfield Stadium
Attendance: 5,191
Referee: Frank Murphy

=== Round 5 ===
1 November 2019
19:35

| (1 BP) Glasgow Warriors (Scotland) | 50–0 | (South Africa) Southern Kings |
| | Report |

Scotstoun Stadium
Attendance: 6,789
Referee: Joy Neville

1 November 2019
19:35

| (1 BP) Leinster (Ireland) | 50–15 | (Wales) Dragons |
| | Report |

RDS Arena
Attendance: 10,568
Referee: Andrewa Piardi

1 November 2019
19:35

| Ulster (Ireland) | 22–7 | (Italy) Zebre |
| Try: Shanahan 20' c Penalty try 51'; Lyttle 70'; Con: Johnston 21'; Pen: Johnston 32' | Report; Highlights | Try: Bellini 1' c Con: Canna 2' |

Kingspan Stadium
Attendance: 10,975
Referee: Sam Grove-White

2 November 2019
15:00

| Scarlets (Wales) | 17–13 | (South Africa) Cheetahs (1 BP) |
| | Report |

Parc y Scarlets
Attendance: 6,341
Referee: Mike Adamson

2 November 2019
17:15

| Ospreys (Wales) | 10–20 | (Ireland) Connacht |
| | Report |

Liberty Stadium
Attendance: 5,726
Referee: Marius Mitrea

2 November 2019
17:15

| Benetton (Italy) | 18–16 | (Scotland) Edinburgh (1 BP) |
| | Report |

Stadio Comunale di Monigo
Attendance: 3,676
Referee: Ben Whitehouse

2 November 2019
19:35

| Cardiff Blues (Wales) | 23–33 | (Ireland) Munster (1 BP) |
| | Report |

Cardiff Arms Park
Attendance: 5,256
Referee: Stuart Berry

=== Round 6 ===
8 November 2019
19:35

| Connacht (Ireland) | 11–42 | (Ireland) Leinster (1 BP) |
| | Report |

Galway Sportsgrounds
Attendance: 8,129
Referee: Sean Gallagher

8 November 2019
19:35

| Edinburgh (Scotland) | 20–7 | (Wales) Dragons |
| | Report |

Murrayfield Stadium
Attendance: 5,762
Referee: George Clancy

9 November 2019
15:00

| (1 BP) Ospreys (Wales) | 14–16 | (South Africa) Southern Kings |
| | Report |

Liberty Stadium
Attendance: 5,240
Referee: Andrea Piardi

9 November 2019
15:00

| Zebre (Italy) | 7–31 | (Scotland) Glasgow Warriors (1 BP) |
| | Report |

Stadio Sergio Lanfranchi
Attendance: 2,000
Referee: Ian Davies

9 November 2019
17:15

| Cardiff Blues (Wales) | 30–17 | (South Africa) Cheetahs |
| | Report |

Cardiff Arms Park
Attendance: 5,698
Referee: Ben Blain

9 November 2019
17:15

| Munster (Ireland) | 22–16 | (Ireland) Ulster (1 BP) |
| Try: Stander 14' c Scannell 35'; Conway 64' c Con: Hanrahan 14'; Bleyendaal 66'; Pen: Hanrahan 25' | Report; Highlights | Try: Herring 49' c Con: Cooney 51'; Pen: Cooney (3) 3' 19' 57' |

Thomond Park
Attendance: 14,436
Referee: Frank Murphy

9 November 2019

| Scarlets (Wales) | 20–17 | (Italy) Benetton (1 BP) |
| | Report |

Parc y Scarlets
Attendance: 6,147
Referee: Andrew Brace

=== Round 7 ===
29 November 2019
19:35

| (1 BP) Munster (Ireland) | 16–18 | (Scotland) Edinburgh |
| | Report |

Irish Independent Park
Attendance: 7,580
Referee: Marius Mitrea

29 November 2019
19:35

| (1 BP) Ulster (Ireland) | 29–5 | (Wales) Scarlets |
| Try: Faddes (2) 4' 78'; Cooney 8' c Rea 16' c Baloucoune 27'; Con: Cooney (2) 8' 17' | Report; Highlights | Try: Morgan 74' |

Kingspan Stadium
Attendance: 12,319
Referee: Sam Grove-White

30 November 2019
15:00

| (2 BP) Benetton (Italy) | 28–31 | (Wales) Cardiff Blues (1 BP) |
| | Report |

Stadio Comunale di Monigo
Attendance: 4,131
Referee: Andy Brace

30 November 2019
17:15

| (1 BP) Connacht (Ireland) | 24–12 | (South Africa) Southern Kings |
| | Report |

Galway Sportsgrounds
Attendance: 5,146
Referee: Ben Whitehouse

30 November 2019
17:15

| Dragons (Wales) | 12–39 | (Italy) Zebre (1 BP) |
| | Report |

Rodney Parade
Attendance: 3,332
Referee: George Clancy

30 November 2019
19:35

| Glasgow Warriors (Scotland) | 10–23 | (Ireland) Leinster |
| | Report |

Scotstoun Stadium
Attendance: 7,351
Referee: Craig Evans

30 November 2019
19:35

| (1 BP) Ospreys (Wales) | 13–18 | (South Africa) Cheetahs |
| | Report |

The Gnoll, Neath
Attendance: 2,347
Referee: Joy Neville

=== Round 8 ===
20 December 2019
19:35

| (1 BP) Leinster (Ireland) | 54–42 | (Ireland) Ulster (1 BP) |
| Try: Deegan (2) 2' c 62' c Penny (2) 15' c 22' c Henshaw 27' c McFadden 39'; Kearney 44' c Kelleher 48' c Con: Byrne (7) 3' 16' 23' 28' 45' 49' 62' | Report; Highlights | Try: Kernohan 8' c Faddes 35' c Gilroy 57' c Jones (2) 64' v 72' c Stewart 80+2'; Con: Johnston (6) 10' 37' 58' 65' 73' 80+2' |

RDS Arena
Attendance: 16,375
Referee: George Clancy

21 December 2019
15:00

| (1 BP) Zebre (Italy) | 8–13 | (Italy) Benetton |
| | Report |

Stadio Sergio Lanfranchi
Attendance: 4,000
Referee: Marius Mitrea

21 December 2019
17:15

| (1 BP) Connacht (Ireland) | 14–19 | (Ireland) Munster |
| | Report |

Galway Sportsgrounds
Attendance: 8,129
Referee: Andy Brace

21 December 2019
17:15

| Dragons (Wales) | 22–20 | (Wales) Scarlets (1 BP) |
| | Report |

Rodney Parade
Attendance: 5,517
Referee: Ben Whitehouse

21 December 2019
19:35

| (1 BP) Ospreys (Wales) | 16–19 | (Wales) Cardiff Blues |
| | Report |

Liberty Stadium
Attendance: 6,664
Referee: Daniel Jones

==== 1872 Cup 1st round ====
21 December 2019
17:45

| Glasgow Warriors (Scotland) | 20–16 | (Scotland) Edinburgh (1 BP) |
| | Report |

Scotstoun Stadium
Attendance: 7,351
Referee: Ben Blain

=== Round 9 ===
26 December 2019
15:00

| Cardiff Blues (Wales) | 16–12 | (Wales) Dragons (1 BP) |
| | Report |

Cardiff Arms Park
Attendance: 12,125
Referee: Nigel Owens

26 December 2019
17:15

| (1 BP) Scarlets (Wales) | 44–0 | (Wales) Ospreys |
| | Report |

Parc y Scarlets
Attendance: 13,682
Referee: Craig Evans

27 December 2019
19:35

| (1 BP) Ulster (Ireland) | 35–3 | (Ireland) Connacht |
| Try: O'Connor 17' c Burns 22' c Baloucoune 43' c Herring 49' c Timoney 76' c Con: Cooney (4) 18' 23' 44' 50'; Johnston 77' | Report; Highlights | Pen: Fitzgerald |

Kingspan Stadium
Attendance: 17,483
Referee: Sean Gallagher

28 December 2019
13:00

| (1 BP) Benetton (Italy) | 36–25 | (Italy) Zebre (1 BP) |
| | Report |

Stadio Comunale di Monigo
Attendance: 5,000
Referee: Andrea Piardi

28 December 2019
18:00

| (1 BP) Munster (Ireland) | 6–13 | (Ireland) Leinster |
| | Report |

Thomond Park
Attendance: 26,267
Referee: Frank Murphy

==== 1872 Cup 2nd round ====
28 December 2019
15:00

| Edinburgh (Scotland) | 29–19 | (Scotland) Glasgow Warriors |
| | Report |

Murrayfield Stadium
Attendance: 27,437
Referee: Mike Adamson

=== Round 10 ===
3 January 2020
19:35

| (1 BP) Cardiff Blues (Wales) | 14–16 | (Wales) Scarlets |
| | Report |

Cardiff Arms Park
Attendance: 12,125
Referee: Frank Murphy

3 January 2020
19:35

| (1 BP) Ulster (Ireland) | 38–17 | (Ireland) Munster |
| Try: Cooney 17. c Baloucoune 34' c Rea 42' c McCloskey 57' c Stockdale 61' c Con: Cooney (5) 18' 35' 43' 58' 62'; Pen: Cooney 14' | Report; Highlights | Try: Daly 9' c Scannell 65' c Con: Carbery (2) 10' 65'; Pen: Carbery 39' |

Kingspan Stadium
Attendance: 17,461
Referee: Daniel Jones

4 January 2020
13:00

| Benetton (Italy) | 19–38 | (Scotland) Glasgow Warriors (1 BP) |
| | Report |

Stadio Comunale di Monigo
Attendance: 4,667
Referee: Nigel Owens

4 January 2020
15:00

| Dragons (Wales) | 25–18 | (Wales) Ospreys (1 BP) |
| | Report |

Rodney Parade
Attendance: 6,421
Referee: Andy Brace

4 January 2020
15:00

| (1 BP) Zebre (Italy) | 41–13 | (South Africa) Cheetahs |
| | Report |

Stadio Sergio Lanfranchi
Attendance: 2,200
Referee: Sam Grove-White

4 January 2020
17:30

| (1 BP) Leinster (Ireland) | 54–7 | (Ireland) Connacht |
| | Report |

RDS Arena
Attendance: 18,300
Referee: Mike Adamson

4 January 2020
19:45

| (1 BP) Edinburgh (Scotland) | 61–13 | (South Africa) Southern Kings |
| | Report |

Murrayfield Stadium
Attendance: 4,873
Referee: Joy Neville

=== Round 8 (South Africa) ===
25 January 2020
15:30

| (1 BP) Southern Kings (South Africa) | 30–31 | (South Africa) Cheetahs (1 BP) |
| | Report |

Nelson Mandela Bay Stadium
Attendance: 4,316
Referee: Stuart Berry

=== Round 9 (South Africa) ===
1 February 2020
17:00

| (1 BP) Cheetahs (South Africa) | 45–0 | (South Africa) Southern Kings |
| | Report |

Free State Stadium
Attendance: 7,832
Referee: Divan Uys

=== Round 11 ===
14 February 2020
19:35

| (1 BP) Glasgow Warriors (Scotland) | 56–24 | (Italy) Zebre |
| | Report |

Scotstoun Stadium
Attendance: 6,692
Referee: Joy Neville

14 February 2020
19:35

| (1 BP) Munster (Ireland) | 68–3 | (South Africa) Southern Kings |
| | Report |

Irish Independent Park
Attendance: 6,854
Referee: Nikoloz Amashukeli

15 February 2020
14:30

| (1 BP) Leinster (Ireland) | 36–12 | (South Africa) Cheetahs |
| | Report |

RDS Arena
Attendance: 7,967
Referee: Ben Whitehouse

15 February 2020
15:00

| (1 BP) Scarlets (Wales) | 9–14 | (Scotland) Edinburgh |
| | Report |

Parc y Scarlets
Attendance: 5,639
Referee: Frank Murphy

15 February 2020
19:15

| Dragons (Wales) | P–P | (Italy) Benetton |

Rodney Parade

- Postponed due to bad weather. Game to be rescheduled for 6 March 2020.

15 February 2020
17:15

| Ospreys (Wales) | 26–24 | (Ireland) Ulster (1 BP) |
| Try: Watkin 15' c Otten (2) 24' 47'; Con: Price 16'; Pen: Price (3) 4' 28' 75' | Report; Highlights | Try: Baloucoune 9' c Faddes 59' c McCloskey 67' c Con: Burns 10'; Johnston (2) 60' 69'; Pen: Burns 35' |

Liberty Stadium
Attendance: 5,868
Referee: Marius Mitrea

15 February 2020
19:35

| (1 BP) Connacht (Ireland) | 29–0 | (Wales) Cardiff Blues |
| | Report |

Galway Sportsgrounds
Attendance: 4,512
Referee: Stuart Berry

=== Round 12 ===
21 February 2020
19:35

| (1 BP) Edinburgh (Scotland) | 41–14 | (Ireland) Connacht |
| | Report |

BT Murrayfield Stadium
Attendance: 5,367
Referee: Marius Mitrea

21 February 2020
19:35

| Ospreys (Wales) | 13–21 | (Ireland) Leinster |
| | Report |

The Gnoll, Neath
Attendance: 3,164
Referee: Stuart Berry

21 February 2020
19:35

| Zebre (Italy) | 0–28 | (Ireland) Munster (1 BP) |
| | Report |

Stadio Giovanni Mari, Legnano
Attendance: 3,300
Referee: Daniel Jones

22 February 2020
19:35

| (1 BP) Glasgow Warriors (Scotland) | 34–19 | (Wales) Dragons |
| | Report |

Scotstoun Stadium
Attendance: 6,203
Referee: Sean Gallagher

22 February 2020
19:35

| Ulster (Ireland) | 20–10 | (South Africa) Cheetahs |
| Try: O'Toole 7' c Baloucoune 45' c Con: Johnston (2) 8' 47'; Pen: Johnston (2) 35' 59' | Report; Highlights | Try: Blommetjies 65' c Con: Pienaar 67'; Pen: Pienaar 38' |

Kingspan Stadium
Attendance: 13,829
Referee: Mike Adamson

23 February 2020
17:15

| (1 BP) Cardiff Blues (Wales) | 34–24 | (Italy) Benetton (1 BP) |
| | Report |

Cardiff Arms Park
Attendance: 5,808
Referee: Frank Murphy

23 February 2020
17:15

| (1 BP) Scarlets (Wales) | 36–17 | (South Africa) Southern Kings |
| | Report |

Parc y Scarlets
Attendance: 5,965
Referee: Andy Brace

=== Round 13 ===
28 February 2020
19:35

| Edinburgh (Scotland) | 14–6 | (Wales) Cardiff Blues |
| | Report |

BT Murrayfield Stadium
Attendance: 5,678
Referee: George Clancy

28 February 2020
19:35

| (1 BP) Leinster (Ireland) | 55–19 | (Scotland) Glasgow Warriors |
| | Report |

RDS Arena
Attendance: 13,250
Referee: Nigel Owens

29 February 2020
13:00

| Zebre (Italy) | P–P | (Wales) Ospreys |

Stadio Sergio Lanfranchi

- Postponed due to coronavirus fears. Awarded as a 0–0 draw

29 February 2020
15:00

| Benetton (Italy) | P–P | (Ireland) Ulster |

Stadio Comunale di Monigo

- Postponed due to coronavirus fears. Awarded as a 0–0 draw

29 February 2020
17:00

| (1 BP) Munster (Ireland) | 29–10 | (Wales) Scarlets |
| | Report |

Thomond Park
Attendance: 13,554
Referee: Mike Adamson

29 February 2020
17:15

| Dragons (Wales) | 13–10 | (South Africa) Cheetahs (1 BP) |
| | Report |

Rodney Parade
Attendance: 4,102
Referee: Andrew Brace

1 March 2020
13:00

| Southern Kings (South Africa) | 19–29 | (Ireland) Connacht (1 BP) |
| | Report |

Nelson Mandela Bay Stadium
Attendance: 1,500
Referee: Cwengile Jadezweni

=== Round 11 (rescheduled game) ===
6 March 2020
19:35

| Dragons (Wales) | 25–37 | (Italy) Benetton (1 BP) |
| | Report |

Rodney Parade
Attendance: 1,857
Referee: George Clancy

- Rescheduled from 15 February 2020.

== Additional Derby Rounds ==
=== Round 14 ===
21 August 2020
20:00

| (1 BP) Benetton (Italy) | 13–17 | (Italy) Zebre |
| | Report |

Stadio Comunale di Monigo
Referee: Andrea Piardi

22 August 2020
15:00

| (1 BP) Scarlets (Wales) | 32–12 | (Wales) Cardiff Blues |
| | Report |

Parc y Scarlets
Referee: Nigel Owens

22 August 2020
19:35

| Leinster (Ireland) | 27–25 | (Ireland) Munster (1 BP) |
| | Report |

Aviva Stadium
Referee: Andrew Brace

23 August 2020
14:15

| Ospreys (Wales) | 20–20 | (Wales) Dragons |
| | Report |

Liberty Stadium
Referee: Adam Jones

23 August 2020
16:30

| (1 BP) Connacht (Ireland) | 26–20 | (Ireland) Ulster (1 BP) |
| Try: Porch 11' c Marmion 22' c Aki 54' c Aungier 78'; Con: Carty (3) 11' 23' 55' | Report; Highlights | Try: Stockdale 48' c Timoney 61' c Con: Burns 49'; Madigan 62'; Pen: Cooney (2) 5' 20' |

Aviva Stadium
Referee: Frank Murphy

==== 1872 Cup 3rd round ====
22 August 2020
17:15

| Glasgow Warriors (Scotland) | 15–30 | (Scotland) Edinburgh |
| | Report |

Murrayfield
Referee: Mike Adamson

=== Round 15 ===
28 August 2020
19:35

| Edinburgh (Scotland) | 3–15 | (Scotland) Glasgow Warriors |
| | Report |

Murrayfield
Attendance: 700
Referee: Ben Blain

29 August 2020
19:35

| Ulster (Ireland) | 10–28 | (Ireland) Leinster |
| Try: Herring 53' c Con: Cooney 54'; Pen: Cooney 67' | Report; Highlights | Try: E. Byrne 2' c Penny 72'; H. Byrne 77'; Con: R. Byrne 4'; H. Byrne 79'; Pen: R. Byrne (3) 14' 20' 44' |

Aviva Stadium
Referee: George Clancy

30 August 2020
15:00

| (1 BP) Munster (Ireland) | 49–12 | (Ireland) Connacht |
| | Report |

Aviva Stadium
Referee: Frank Murphy

30 August 2020
20:00

| (1 BP) Zebre (Italy) | 9-16 | (Italy) Benetton |
| | Report |

Stadio Sergio Lanfranchi
Referee: Gianluca Gnecchi

==== Judgement Day ====
29 August 2020
17:15

| Dragons (Wales) | 20–41 | (Wales) Scarlets (1 BP) |
| | Report |

Rodney Parade
Referee: Craig Evans

30 August
17:00

| Cardiff Blues (Wales) | 29-20 | (Wales) Ospreys |
| | Report |

Rodney Parade
Referee: Adam Jones

== Play-offs ==
In a change to the normal format, the top two sides from each of the two conferences met in the two semi-finals to determine the finalists. The quarter-finals featuring the second and third teams in each conference were scrapped for the 2019–20 season.

Semi-finals
4 September 2020
(Ireland) Leinster (A1) | 13
(Ireland) Munster (B2) | 3
5 September 2020
(Scotland) Edinburgh (B1) | 19
(Ireland) Ulster (A2) | 22

Final
12 September 2020
(Ireland) Leinster | 27
(Ireland) Ulster | 5

=== Semi-finals ===
4 September 2020
19:35

| Leinster (Ireland) | 13–3 | (Ireland) Munster |
| Try: Kelleher 27' c Con: Sexton (1/1) 28'; Pen: Sexton (2/3) 40', 67' | Report | Pen: Hanrahan (1/3) 5' |

Aviva Stadium
Attendance: 0
Referee: Andrew Brace (Ireland)

5 September 2020
19:35

| Edinburgh (Scotland) | 19–22 | (Ireland) Ulster |
| Try: McInally 14'; Graham 46'; Dean 57'; Con: Van der Walt (2/3) 47', 59' | Report | Try: Lyttle 54'; Herring 62'; Andrew 75'; Con: Burns (1/2) 55'; Madigan (1/1) 76'; Pen: Madigan (1/1) 80' |

Murrayfield Stadium
Attendance: 0
Referee: Frank Murphy (Ireland)

=== Final ===
12 September 2020
19:35

| Leinster (Ireland) | 27–5 | (Ireland) Ulster |
| Try: Lowe 12' c Henshaw 45' c Doris 71' c Con: R. Byrne (2/2) 14', 47'; Sexton (1/1) 72'; Pen: R. Byrne (2/2) 26', 44' | Report | Try: Hume 3' m |

Aviva Stadium
Attendance: 0
Referee: Andrew Brace (Ireland)

== Attendances by club ==
- Includes quarter-finals and semi-finals – the final is not included as it is held at a neutral venue. Due to the Conference A & B structure of 21 rounds in the Pro14, some teams played 10 league home games during the league stage, while others played 11. Does not include European Champions Cup play-off game.

| Club | Home games | Total | Average | Highest | Lowest | % Capacity |
|---|---|---|---|---|---|---|
| (Italy) Benetton | 6 | 24,863 | 4,144 | 5,000 | 3,676 | 62% |
| (Wales) Cardiff Blues | 6 | 46,202 | 7,700 | 12,125 | 5,190 | 64% |
| (South Africa) Cheetahs | 4 | 21,756 | 5,439 | 7,832 | 4,528 | 12% |
| (Ireland) Connacht | 6 | 35,700 | 5,950 | 8,129 | 4,512 | 73% |
| (Wales) Dragons | 7 | 28,159 | 4,023 | 6,421 | 1,857 | 46% |
| (Scotland) Edinburgh | 7 | 58,529 | 8,361 | 27,437 | 4,221 | 12% |
| (Scotland) Glasgow Warriors | 7 | 47,991 | 6,856 | 7,351 | 6,203 | 93% |
| (Ireland) Leinster | 7 | 90,431 | 12,919 | 18,300 | 7,967 | 70% |
| (Ireland) Munster | 7 | 86,880 | 12,411 | 26,267 | 6,854 | 75% |
| (Wales) Ospreys | 7 | 34,679 | 4,954 | 6,664 | 2,347 | 33% |
| (Wales) Scarlets | 7 | 50,613 | 7,230 | 13,682 | 5,639 | 49% |
| (South Africa) Southern Kings | 5 | 13,815 | 2,763 | 4,316 | 1,500 | 6% |
| (Ireland) Ulster | 7 | 96,725 | 13,818 | 17,483 | 10,975 | 76% |
| (Italy) Zebre | 6 | 16,100 | 2,683 | 4,000 | 2,000 | 54% |

=== Highest attendances ===
| Date | Game | Stadium | Attendance |
|---|---|---|---|
| 28 December 2019 | Edinburgh (H) v Glasgow Warriors | Murrayfield Stadium | 27,437 |
| 28 December 2019 | Munster (H) v Leinster | Thomond Park | 26,267 |
| 4 January 2020 | Leinster (H) v Connacht | RDS Arena | 18,300 |
| 27 December 2019 | Ulster (H) v Connacht | Ravenhill Stadium | 17,483 |
| 4 January 2020 | Ulster (H) v Munster | Ravenhill Stadium | 17,461 |
| 20 December 2019 | Leinster (H) v Ulster | RDS Arena | 16,375 |
| 9 November 2019 | Munster (H) v Ulster | Thomond Park | 14,436 |
| 22 February 2020 | Ulster (H) v Cheetahs | Ravenhill Stadium | 13,829 |
| 26 December 2019 | Scarlets (H) v Ospreys | Parc y Scarlets | 13,682 |
| 29 February 2020 | Munster (H) v Scarlets | Thomond Park | 13,554 |

== End of Season Awards ==
=== PRO14 Dream Team ===
The 2019–20 Pro14 Dream Team is:

| Pos | | Player | Team |
|---|---|---|---|
| FB | 15 | (Scotland) Blair Kinghorn | (Scotland) Edinburgh |
| RW | 14 | (Australia) Monty Ioane | (Italy) Benetton |
| OC | 13 | (Samoa) Rey Lee-Lo | (Wales) Cardiff Blues |
| IC | 12 | (Ireland) Stuart McCloskey | (Ireland) Ulster |
| LW | 11 | (South Africa) Duhan van der Merwe | (Scotland) Edinburgh |
| FH | 10 | (South Africa) Jaco van der Walt | (Scotland) Edinburgh |
| SH | 9 | (Ireland) John Cooney | (Ireland) Ulster |
| N8 | 8 | (Fiji) Viliame Mata | (Scotland) Edinburgh |
| OF | 7 | (Ireland) Will Connors | (Ireland) Leinster |
| BF | 6 | (Ireland) Max Deegan | (Ireland) Leinster |
| RL | 5 | (Scotland) Grant Gilchrist | (Scotland) Edinburgh |
| LL | 4 | (Australia) Scott Fardy | (Ireland) Leinster |
| TP | 3 | (Wales) Leon Brown | (Wales) Dragons |
| HK | 2 | (South Africa) Joseph Dweba | (South Africa) Cheetahs |
| LP | 1 | (South Africa) Pierre Schoeman | (Scotland) Edinburgh |

=== Award winners ===
The 2019–20 Pro14 season award winners are:

| Award | Winner |
|---|---|
| Players' Player of the Season | (South Africa) Duhan van der Merwe (Edinburgh) |
| Young Player of the Season | (Ireland) Caelan Doris (Leinster) |
| Coach of the Season | (England) Richard Cockerill (Edinburgh) |
| Golden Boot | (Ireland) JJ Hanrahan (Munster) |
| Top Try Scorer | (South Africa) Rhyno Smith (Cheetahs) |
| Tackle Machine | (Ireland) Paul Boyle (Connacht) |
| Turnover King | (Wales) Josh Macleod (Scarlets) |
| Iron Man | (Wales) Matthew Screech (Dragons) |

== Leading scorers ==
Note: Flags to the left of player names indicate national team as has been defined under World Rugby eligibility rules, or primary nationality for players who have not yet earned international senior caps. Players may hold one or more non-WR nationalities.

=== Most points ===
As of 14 September 2020

| Rank | Player | Club | Points |
|---|---|---|---|
| 1 | (Ireland) JJ Hanrahan | (Ireland) Munster | 124 |
| 2 | (Ireland) John Cooney | (Ireland) Ulster | 105 |
| 3 | (Wales) Sam Davies | (Wales) Dragons | 94 |
| 4 | (Ireland) Ross Byrne | (Ireland) Leinster | 93 |
| 5 | (South Africa) Jaco van der Walt | (Scotland) Edinburgh | 86 |
| 6 | (Ireland) Ian Keatley | (Italy) Benetton | 82 |
| 7 | (Wales) Dan Jones | (Wales) Scarlets | 74 |
| 8 | (South Africa) Ruan Pienaar | (South Africa) Cheetahs | 73 |
| 9 | (Wales) Jarrod Evans | (Wales) Cardiff Blues | 72 |
| 10 | (Wales) Luke Price | (Wales) Ospreys | 65 |

=== Most tries ===
As of 14 September 2020

| Rank | Player | Club | Tries |
|---|---|---|---|
| 1 | (South Africa) Rhyno Smith | (South Africa) Cheetahs | 10 |
| 2 | (Ireland) Dave Kearney | (Ireland) Leinster | 9 |
| 2 | (Wales) Steff Evans | (Wales) Scarlets | 9 |
| 4 | (Ireland) Rónan Kelleher | (Ireland) Leinster | 8 |
| 5 | (South Africa) Joseph Dweba | (South Africa) Cheetahs | 7 |
| 5 | (Scotland) George Horne | (Scotland) Glasgow Warriors | 7 |
| 5 | (South Africa) Duhan van der Merwe | (Scotland) Edinburgh | 7 |
| 5 | (New Zealand) James Lowe | (Ireland) Leinster | 7 |
| 9 | (Wales) Taine Basham | (Wales) Dragons | 6 |
| 9 | (Scotland) Mark Bennett | (Scotland) Edinburgh | 6 |
| 9 | (South Africa) Arno Botha | (Ireland) Munster | 6 |
| 9 | (New Zealand) Matt Faddes | (Ireland) Ulster | 6 |
| 9 | (New Zealand) Hame Faiva | (Italy) Benetton | 6 |
