= Polkinghorne =

Polkinghorne is a Cornish-language surname. Notable people with the surname include:

- Adam Polkinghorne (born 1975), cricketer
- Clare Polkinghorne (born 1989), football player
- David Polkinghorne (footballer) (born 1956), footballer
- David Polkinghorne (cricketer) (born 1964), banker and cricketer
- Donald E. Polkinghorne (1936–2018), American academic and psychologist
- Francis Polkinghorne Pascoe (1813–1893), entomologist
- James Polkinghorne (1788–1854), wrestler
- James Polkinghorne (footballer) (born 1989), football player
- John Polkinghorne (1930–2021), physicist and theologian
- Robert Polkinghorne (born 1958), footballer
