= David Polkinghorne =

David Polkinghorne may refer to:

- David Polkinghorne (footballer)
- David Polkinghorne (cricketer)
