= Kearsney College =

Coordinates: 29°45′56″S 30°44′52″E

- Kearsney College school crest
- Botha's Hill, KwaZulu-Natal; South Africa

Information
- School type: All-boys private school
- Motto: Carpe Diem (Seize the Day)
- Religious affiliation: Methodist Church
- Established: 1921; 105 years ago
- Founder: Sir Liege Hulett
- Locale: Suburban
- School number: +27 (031) 765 9600
- Headmaster: Mr Patrick Lees
- Exam board: IEB
- Grades: 8–12 (Forms 2-6)
- Gender: Male
- Age: 13 to 18
- Enrollment: 650 boys
- Language: English
- Schedule: 07:30 - 16:00
- Campus: Suburban Campus
- Houses: Junior Boarding house: Haley; Senior Boarding houses: Finningley; Gillingham; Pembroke; Sheffield
- Colours: Blue; Maroon; White
- Mascot: Greyhound
- Rivals: Maritzburg College; Michaelhouse; Westville Boys' High School; Durban High School
- School fees: R 350 130 p.a. (boarding) 2024; R 240 900 p.a. (tuition) 2024
- Feeder schools: Cowan House Preparatory School; Cordwalles Preparatory School; Durban Preparatory School; Highbury Preparatory School; Hillcrest Primary School; Merchiston Preparatory School; Pridwin Preparatory School; St Peter's Preparatory School; The Ridge School; Umhlali Prep School
- Affiliation: ISASA
- World Choir Games: World Choir Games Champions (2012, 2014, 2018)
- Website: www.kearsney.com

Kearsney College is a private boarding, English medium high school for boys in Botha's Hill, a small town between the provincial capital of Pietermaritzburg and Durban, in the KwaZulu-Natal province of South Africa.

== History ==
Kearsney College was founded by Sir Liege Hulett in 1921. Hulett founded what would become Tongaat Hulett Sugar. Sir Liege Hulett cherished the idea of establishing a boys' school for Methodist ministers and their sons and those of the families of the free churches. Kearsney took its name from Kearsney, Kent where Sir Liege Hulett had moved to where his father established St Martin's Academy.

He considered Kearsney House, the house he originally built for his family, ideally suited for this purpose. On 29 November 1920, a contract was signed with the Wesleyan Church to use Kearsney House as a school. This was the birth of Kearsney College and remains a living memorial to Sir Liege. The school opened with 11 boys. Kearsney College remained at the Kearsney Estate until June 1939, when it moved to its present site at Botha's Hill between Pietermaritzburg and Durban. The decision to move the school was based on the reluctance of parents to send their sons to a school on the north coast that suffered many cases of malaria in the 1930s. However, none were reported at Kearsney. On hearing of this, Mr Clement Stott of Botha’s Hill donated 25 acres (10 ha) of land. At the same time, Mr JJ Crookes offered to build a boarding house. The move was completed a month before the beginning of World War II. The new Kearsney College opened with 196 boys.

Kearsney's badge was designed by the then-headmaster, Mr RH Matterson, and the chaplain, the Rev. WH Irving, in about 1923. The greyhound is taken from the arms of the founder, Sir James Liege Hulett The scallop shells and the dividing chevron are from the arms of the founder of Methodism, John Wesley. The pheon, or arrowhead, is taken from the badge of Sidney Sussex College, Cambridge, where Matterson studied. The motto Carpe Diem, traditionally at Kearsney translated "Seize the Day," comes from the Roman poet Horace.

=== Headmasters ===
- D. Pyne Mercier (1921–1922)
- R.H. Matterson (1923–1946)
- S.G. Osler (1947–1964)
- J.H. Hopkins (1965–1974)
- E.W. Silcock (1975–1990)
- O.J. Roberts (1991–2000)
- E.D. van den Aardweg (2001 -2022)
- P Lees (2023 - date)

== Boarding Houses ==
There are five boarding houses - four senior houses and one junior house. They are Finningley (blue), Gillingham (red), Pembroke (green), Sheffield (yellow) and Haley (house for students' first year of boarding). Finningley is named after the town of Finningley in South Yorkshire, England. Gillingham is named after Gillingham, Kent, England, where Sir Liege Hulett lived as a young man Pembroke is named after the town of Pembroke, Pembrokeshire, Wales. Sheffield is named after Sheffield in South Yorkshire, England, where Sir Liege Hulett moved following his time in Gillingham.

== Academics ==
The College offers the following subject choices for Grades 10,11,12 : English; Afrikaans or isiZulu; Mathematics or Mathematical Literacy; Life Orientation; Accounting, Business Studies, Dramatic Art; Engineering Graphics and Design; Geography; History; Information Technology; Life Sciences (Biology); Music; Science and Visual Arts.

In 2020, Kearsney had a 100% pass rate and a 100% Bachelor Degree pass rate.

== Clubs and Cultural Activities ==
Clubs offered range from academic extension (12 Club; History Club) to personal enrichment (SCA; Dale Carnegie Course; Chess) to creative (Photographic Club; Video Editing Club; Enviro Club) to the physical (Surfing; Survival Club; Mountain Bike Club) and the just plain fun (Board Games Club). Finally, boys are coached in public speaking skills through their membership of the Speakers’ Circle and Inner Circle Speakers’ Club.

== Sports ==
Sports facilities include several rugby fields, several cricket ovals, an artificial turf for field hockey and two swimming pools. Included is SportZone, an indoor training facility with several cricket nets, two indoor and two outdoor basketball courts, and a gymnasium.

Sports on offer at the College include:

- Basketball
- Canoeing
- Cricket
- Cross country
- Golf
- Hockey
- Indoor hockey
- Rugby
- Soccer
- Squash
- Swimming
- Tennis
- Water polo

Kearsney has hosted the Kearsney Easter Rugby Festival since 2008. This school's rugby tournament regularly attracts top South African school teams. Previous festival players that have achieved higher honours include : Handré Pollard, Warrick Gelant, Jan Serfontein, RG Snyman, Dan du Preez, Jean-Luc du Preez, JJ van der Mescht, [James Hall]

== International Exchange Programme ==
Kearsney has an international exchange programme with several schools. Schools that Kearsney pupils spend time at include: Catholic University School in Dublin, Ireland, Mount St Mary’s College, Derbyshire, England and Canberra Grammar School in Red Hill, Australia.

== Notable alumni ==
=== Authors ===
- Douglas Livingstone (poet) (1949)
- Bill Schermbrucker

=== Politicians ===
- Tony Leon (1974) - founder of South Africa's Democratic Alliance

=== Businessmen ===
- David Polkinghorne – CEO of Grindrod Bank
- Nick Sloane (salvage expert) - Salvage master for Costa Concordia
- Gordon Schachat - Property, private equity and investment banking

=== Medical ===
- Henry Markram - Founder and Director of the Blue Brain Project.

=== Other ===
- Peter Ralph Randall - anti-apartheid publisher
- Alan Dell - BBC radio broadcaster
- Kendrew Lascelles - actor, performer and writer
- Andrew Boraine

=== Sports ===
==== Cricket ====
- Andrew Hudson (1982) - South African national team cricket player
- Kyle Abbott - South African national team cricket player and best first-class figures in more than 60 years
- David Polkinghorne – first-class cricketer
- Chad Bowes - New Zealand national team cricket player

==== Hockey ====
- Lloyd Madsen 2007 - South African Hockey
- Nqobile Ntuli 2017 - South African Hockey
- Siphesihle 'Sihle' Ntuli, South Africa coached the South Africa men's national field hockey team.
- Calvin Davis 2024 - South African Hockey

==== Rugby ====
- Harry Walker (rugby union, born 1928) - Springbok rugby player - Cap 311
- Etienne Fynn (1990) - Springbok rugby player - Cap 710. Finished schooling at St. Charles College, Pietermaritzburg
- Trevor Halstead (1994) - Springbok rugby player - Cap 720
- Jean-Luc du Preez (2013) - Springbok rugby player - Cap 881
- Dan du Preez (2013) - Springbok rugby player - Cap 889
- Robert du Preez (2012) - Springbok rugby player - Cap 904
- Matt Stevens (2001) - England and British & Irish Lions rugby player
- Brad Barritt (2004) - England rugby player
- Dylan Richardson (2017) - Scotland rugby player - Cap 1128
- Giovanni 'John' Antoni Italy Rugby
- Francois Viljoen - USA rugby player
- Kevin Dalzell - USA rugby player
- Greg Goosen
- James Hall (rugby union, born 1996)
- Steve Meyer
- Sibusiso Sangweni
- Warren Seals

==== Other ====
- Myles Brown - Rio Olympic Games – Swimming
- Troyden Prinsloo - Swimming
- Mpumelelo Mhlongo - Paralympic Athlete
- Damien Roberts - Tennis Player
- Connor Wilson - Alpine Skier
