= List of Southern Kings records and statistics =

This article lists the records of the Southern Kings. The team participated in Super Rugby in 2013, 2016 and 2017 and in the Pro14 since the 2017–18 season. In addition to those two competitions, they also played first class matches against the British & Irish Lions in 2009, played in the IRB Nations Cup in 2011 and played in two promotion/relegation matches after the 2013 Super Rugby season.

== Team match records ==
The Southern Kings' team match records are:

Team match records
Record	Overall (Note: Updated 4 November 2018.)	Pro14	Super Rugby	Other
Biggest wins	41 point margin; (44–3 vs Rebels, 29 April 2017, Port Elizabeth); 32 point margin; (45–13 vs Dragons, 2 March 2018, Port Elizabeth); 27 point margin; (39–12 vs Portugal, 19 June 2011, Bucharest); 14 point margin; (31–17 vs Georgia, 10 June 2011, Bucharest); (37–23 vs Sunwolves, 4 March 2017, Singapore)	32 point margin; (45–13 vs Dragons, 2 March 2018, Port Elizabeth); 10 point margin; (38–28 vs Glasgow Warriors, 22 September 2018, Port Elizabeth)	41 point margin; (44–3 vs Rebels, 29 April 2017, Port Elizabeth); 14 point margin; (37–23 vs Sunwolves, 4 March 2017, Singapore); 12 point margin; (22–10 vs Force, 22 February 2013, Port Elizabeth); 7 point margin; (34–27 vs Highlanders, 11 May 2013, Port Elizabeth); (29–22 vs Jaguares, 27 May 2017, Port Elizabeth)	27 point margin; (39–12 vs Portugal, 19 June 2011, Bucharest); 14 point margin; (31–17 vs Georgia, 10 June 2011, Bucharest); 5 point margin; (23–18 vs Lions, 3 August 2013, Johannesburg); 4 point margin; (27–23 vs Romania, 15 June 2011, Bucharest)
Heaviest defeats	62 point margin; (10–72 vs Waratahs, 4 May 2013, Port Elizabeth); 57 point margin; (7–64 vs Leinster, 23 February 2018, Dublin); 53 point margin; (0–53 vs Sharks, 21 May 2017, Durban); 49 point margin; (10–59 vs Ulster, 9 February 2018, Belfast); 47 point margin; (10–57 vs Scarlets, 2 September 2017, Llanelli)	57 point margin; (7–64 vs Leinster, 23 February 2018, Dublin); 49 point margin; (10–59 vs Ulster, 9 February 2018, Belfast); 47 point margin; (10–57 vs Scarlets, 2 September 2017, Llanelli); 40 point margin; (14–54 vs Scarlets, 29 September 2018, Llanelli); 33 point margin; (12–45 vs Cardiff Blues, 14 April 2018, Port Elizabeth)	62 point margin; (10–72 vs Waratahs, 4 May 2013, Port Elizabeth); 53 point margin; (0–53 vs Sharks, 21 May 2017, Durban); 46 point margin; (27–73 vs Jaguares, 30 April 2017, Buenos Aires); 45 point margin; (13–58 vs Sharks, 13 July 2013, Durban); 44 point margin; (10–54 vs Lions, 28 May 2017, Johannesburg)	12 point margin; (8–20 vs British & Irish Lions (16 June 2009, Port Elizabeth); 7 point margin; (19–26 vs Lions, 26 July 2013, Port Elizabeth)
Highest scores	45 points; (45–13 vs Dragons, 2 March 2018, Port Elizabeth); 44 points; (44–3 vs Rebels, 29 April 2017, Port Elizabeth); 41 points; (41–46 vs Force, 9 April 2017, Perth); 39 points; (39–12 vs Portugal, 19 June 2011, Bucharest); 38 points; (38–28 vs Glasgow Warriors, 22 September 2018, Port Elizabeth)	45 points; (45–13 vs Dragons, 2 March 2018, Port Elizabeth); 38 points; (38–28 vs Glasgow Warriors, 22 September 2018, Port Elizabeth); 36 points; (36–43 vs Ulster, 4 November 2017, Port Elizabeth); 35 points; (35–36 vs Benetton, 24 March 2018, Port Elizabeth); 34 points; (34–41 vs Scarlets, 26 October 2018, Port Elizabeth)	44 points; (44–3 vs Rebels, 29 April 2017, Port Elizabeth); 41 points; (41–46 vs Force, 9 April 2017, Perth); 37 points; (37–23 vs Sunwolves, 4 March 2017, Singapore); 35 points; (35–32 vs Sharks, 13 May 2017, Port Elizabeth); 34 points; (34–27 vs Highlanders, 11 May 2013, Port Elizabeth)	39 points; (39–12 vs Portugal, 19 June 2011, Bucharest); 31 points; (31–17 vs Georgia, 10 June 2011, Bucharest); 27 points; (27–23 vs Romania, 15 June 2011, Bucharest); 23 points; (23–18 vs Lions, 3 August 2013, Johannesburg); 19 points; (19–26 vs Lions, 26 July 2013, Port Elizabeth)
Most points conceded	73 points; (27–73 vs Jaguares, 30 April 2017, Buenos Aires); 72 points; (10–72 vs Waratahs, 4 May 2013, Port Elizabeth); 64 points; (7–64 vs Leinster, 23 February 2018, Dublin); 59 points; (10–59 vs Ulster, 9 February 2018, Belfast); 58 points; (13–58 vs Sharks, 13 July 2013, Durban); (24–58 vs Chiefs, 12 March 2016, Port Elizabeth)	64 points; (7–64 vs Leinster, 23 February 2018, Dublin); 59 points; (10–59 vs Ulster, 9 February 2018, Belfast); 57 points; (10–57 vs Scarlets, 2 September 2017, Llanelli); 54 points; (14–54 vs Scarlets, 29 September 2018, Llanelli); 48 points; (21–48 vs Edinburgh, 1 December 2017, Llanelli)	73 points; (27–73 vs Jaguares, 30 April 2017, Buenos Aires); 72 points; (10–72 vs Waratahs, 4 May 2013, Port Elizabeth); 58 points; (13–58 vs Sharks, 13 July 2013, Durban); (24–58 vs Chiefs, 12 March 2016, Port Elizabeth); 57 points; (24–57 vs Crusaders, 19 March 2016, Christchurch); (21–57 vs Lions, 8 July 2016, Johannesburg)	26 points; (19–26 vs Lions, 26 July 2013, Port Elizabeth); 23 points; (27–23 vs Romania, 15 June 2011, Bucharest); 20 points; (8–20 vs British & Irish Lions (16 June 2009, Port Elizabeth); 18 points; (23–18 vs Lions, 3 August 2013, Johannesburg); 17 points; (31–17 vs Georgia, 10 June 2011, Bucharest)
Most tries	6 tries; (41–46 vs Force, 9 April 2017, Perth); (44–3 vs Rebels, 29 April 2017, Port Elizabeth); (45–13 vs Dragons, 2 March 2018, Port Elizabeth); 5 tries; (39–12 vs Portugal, 19 June 2011, Bucharest); (34–47 vs Reds, 15 April 2017, Brisbane); (36–43 vs Ulster, 4 November 2017, Port Elizabeth); (35–36 vs Benetton, 24 March 2018, Port Elizabeth); (38–28 vs Glasgow Warriors, 22 September 2018, Port Elizabeth); (31–38 vs Leinster, 4 November 2018, Port Elizabeth)	6 tries; (45–13 vs Dragons, 2 March 2018, Port Elizabeth); 5 tries; (36–43 vs Ulster, 4 November 2017, Port Elizabeth); (35–36 vs Benetton, 24 March 2018, Port Elizabeth); (38–28 vs Glasgow Warriors, 22 September 2018, Port Elizabeth); (31–38 vs Leinster, 4 November 2018, Port Elizabeth)	6 tries; (41–46 vs Force, 9 April 2017, Perth); (44–3 vs Rebels, 29 April 2017, Port Elizabeth); 5 tries; (34–47 vs Reds, 15 April 2017, Brisbane); 4 tries; 9 matches	5 tries; (39–12 vs Portugal, 19 June 2011, Bucharest); 3 tries; (31–17 vs Georgia, 10 June 2011, Bucharest); 2 tries; (27–23 vs Romania, 15 June 2011, Bucharest); (19–26 vs Lions, 26 July 2013, Port Elizabeth); (23–18 vs Lions, 3 August 2013, Johannesburg)
Most tries conceded	11 tries; (27–73 vs Jaguares, 30 April 2017, Buenos Aires); (10–72 vs Waratahs, 4 May 2013, Port Elizabeth); 10 tries; (7–64 vs Leinster, 23 February 2018, Dublin); (13–58 vs Sharks, 13 July 2013, Durban); 9 tries; (10–59 vs Ulster, 9 February 2018, Belfast)	10 tries; (7–64 vs Leinster, 23 February 2018, Dublin); 9 tries; (10–59 vs Ulster, 9 February 2018, Belfast); 8 tries; (10–57 vs Scarlets, 2 September 2017, Llanelli); (14–54 vs Scarlets, 29 September 2018, Llanelli); 7 tries; 4 matches	11 tries; (27–73 vs Jaguares, 30 April 2017, Buenos Aires); (10–72 vs Waratahs, 4 May 2013, Port Elizabeth); 10 tries; (13–58 vs Sharks, 13 July 2013, Durban); 8 tries; 5 matches	2 tries; (8–20 vs British & Irish Lions (16 June 2009, Port Elizabeth); (39–12 vs Portugal, 19 June 2011, Bucharest); (31–17 vs Georgia, 10 June 2011, Bucharest); (19–26 vs Lions, 26 July 2013, Port Elizabeth); (23–18 vs Lions, 3 August 2013, Johannesburg)

== Player match records ==
The Southern Kings' player match records are:

Player match records
Record	Overall	Pro14	Super Rugby	Other
Most points by a player		19 points; Masixole Banda vs Dragons (34–41, 26 October 2018, Port Elizabeth); 15 points; Kurt Coleman vs Dragons (45–13, 2 March 2018, Port Elizabeth)	21 points; Lionel Cronjé vs Bulls (31–30, 8 July 2017, Pretoria)	19 points; Louis Strydom vs Romania (31–30, 15 June 2011, Bucharest); 18 points; Scott van Breda vs Lions (23–18, 3 August 2013, Johannesburg); 16 points; Louis Strydom vs Georgia (31–17, 10 June 2011, Bucharest); 15 points; Siyanda Grey vs Georgia (31–17, 10 June 2011, Bucharest); 10 points; Siyanda Grey vs Portugal (39–12, 19 June 2011, Bucharest); Louis Strydom vs Portugal (39–12, 19 June 2011, Bucharest)
Most tries by a player		2 tries; Bjorn Basson vs Scarlets (14–54, 29 September 2018, Llanelli); Martin du Toit vs Glasgow Warriors (38–28, 22 September 2018, Port Elizabeth); Berton Klaasen vs Ulster (36–43, 4 November 2017, Port Elizabeth); Yaw Penxe vs Ulster (36–43, 4 November 2017, Port Elizabeth); Stefan Ungerer vs Leinster (31–38, 4 November 2018, Port Elizabeth); Luzuko Vulindlu vs Dragons (45–13, 2 March 2018, Port Elizabeth)	3 tries; Malcolm Jaer vs Force (41–46, 9 April 2017, Perth)	3 tries; Siyanda Grey vs Georgia (31–17, 10 June 2011, Bucharest); 2 tries; Siyanda Grey vs Portugal (39–12, 19 June 2011, Bucharest); 1 try; 10 players
Most conversions by a player		6 conversions; Kurt Coleman vs Dragons (45–13, 2 March 2018, Port Elizabeth)	4 conversions; Demetri Catrakilis vs Highlanders (34–27, 11 May 2013, Port Elizabeth); Lionel Cronjé vs Sunwolves (37–23, 4 March 2017, Singapore); Lionel Cronjé vs Force (41–46, 9 April 2017, Perth); Lionel Cronjé vs Jaguares (31–30, 30 June 2017, Buenos Aires)	2 conversions; Mzwandile Stick vs Portugal (39–12, 19 June 2011, Bucharest); Louis Strydom vs Georgia (31–17, 10 June 2011, Bucharest); Louis Strydom vs Portugal (39–12, 19 June 2011, Bucharest); Scott van Breda vs Lions (23–18, 3 August 2013, Johannesburg); 1 conversion; Louis Strydom vs Romania (31–30, 15 June 2011, Bucharest)
Most penalties by a player		3 penalties; Masixole Banda vs Zebre (16–32, 31 August 2018, Parma); Kurt Coleman vs Edinburgh (21–48, 1 December 2017, Port Elizabeth)	5 penalties; Demetri Catrakilis vs Cheetahs (22–34, 25 May 2013, Port Elizabeth)	4 penalties; Louis Strydom vs Georgia (31–17, 10 June 2011, Bucharest); Louis Strydom vs Romania (31–30, 15 June 2011, Bucharest); 3 penalties; Demetri Catrakilis vs Lions (19–26, 26 July 2013, Port Elizabeth); Scott van Breda vs Lions (23–18, 3 August 2013, Johannesburg); 2 penalties; Louis Strydom vs Portugal (39–12, 19 June 2011, Bucharest)
Most drop goals by a player	1 drop goal; Mzwandile Stick vs Romania (27–23, 15 June 2011, Bucharest); Demetri Catrakilis vs Rebels (30–27, 13 April 2013, Melbourne); Lionel Cronjé vs Sharks (35–32, 13 May 2017, Port Elizabeth); Lionel Cronjé vs Bulls (31–30, 8 July 2017, Pretoria)	None scored	1 drop goal; Demetri Catrakilis vs Rebels (30–27, 13 April 2013, Melbourne); Lionel Cronjé vs Sharks (35–32, 13 May 2017, Port Elizabeth); Lionel Cronjé vs Bulls (31–30, 8 July 2017, Pretoria)	1 drop goal; Mzwandile Stick vs Romania (27–23, 15 June 2011, Bucharest)

== Team season records ==
The Southern Kings' team season records are:

Team season records
Record	Overall	Pro14	Super Rugby	Other
Most team points	391 points; 15 matches, 2017 Super Rugby; 378 points; 21 matches, 2017–18 Pro14; 298 points; 16 matches, 2013 Super Rugby; 282 points; 15 matches, 2016 Super Rugby; 167 points; 8 matches, 2018–19 Pro14	378 points; 21 matches, 2017–18; 167 points; 8 matches, 2018–19	391 points; 15 matches, 2017; 298 points; 16 matches, 2013; 282 points; 15 matches, 2016	—
Most team tries	49 tries; 15 matches, 2017 Super Rugby; 48 tries; 21 matches, 2017–18 Pro14; 34 tries; 15 matches, 2016 Super Rugby; 27 tries; 16 matches, 2013 Super Rugby; 23 tries; 8 matches, 2018–19 Pro14	48 tries; 21 matches, 2017–18; 23 tries; 8 matches, 2018–19	49 tries; 15 matches, 2017; 34 tries; 15 matches, 2016; 27 tries; 16 matches, 2013	—

== Player season records ==
The Southern Kings' player season records are:

Player season records
Record	Overall	Pro14	Super Rugby	Other
Most points by a player	151 points; Demetri Catrakilis (2013 Super Rugby); 136 points; Lionel Cronjé (2017 Super Rugby); 81 points; Louis Fouché (2017 Super Rugby); 57 points; Masixole Banda (2018–19 Pro14); 55 points; Makazole Mapimpi (2017 Super Rugby)	57 points; Masixole Banda (2018–19); 40 points; Masixole Banda (2017–18); 39 points; Kurt Coleman (2017–18); 26 points; Ntabeni Dukisa (2017–18); 25 points; Yaw Penxe (2017–18); Yaw Penxe (2018–19)	151 points; Demetri Catrakilis (2013); 136 points; Lionel Cronjé (2017); 81 points; Louis Fouché (2017); 55 points; Makazole Mapimpi (2017); 31 points; Elgar Watts (2017); George Whitehead (2013)	—
Most tries by a player	11 tries; Makazole Mapimpi (2017 Super Rugby); 6 tries; Malcolm Jaer (2017 Super Rugby); Wimpie van der Walt (2013 Super Rugby); 5 tries; Yaw Penxe (2017–18 Pro14); Yaw Penxe (2018–19 Pro14); 4 tries; 9 players	5 tries; Yaw Penxe (2017–18); Yaw Penxe (2018–19); 4 tries; Bjorn Basson (2018–19); Berton Klaasen (2017–18); Harlon Klaasen (2017–18); Michael Makase (2017–18); Luzuko Vulindlu (2017–18)	11 tries; Makazole Mapimpi (2017); 6 tries; Malcolm Jaer (2017); Wimpie van der Walt (2013); 4 tries; Sergeal Petersen (2013); Chris Cloete (2016); Edgar Marutlulle (2016); Steven Sykes (2016)	—
Most conversions by a player	30 conversions; Lionel Cronjé (2017 Super Rugby); 17 conversions; Masixole Banda (2018–19 Pro14); Louis Fouché (2016 Super Rugby); 14 conversions; Demetri Catrakilis (2013 Super Rugby); 12 conversions; Kurt Coleman (2017–18 Pro14)	17 conversions; Masixole Banda (2018–19); 12 conversions; Kurt Coleman (2017–18); 7 conversions; Masixole Banda (2017–18); Oliver Zono (2017–18); 4 conversions; Ntabeni Dukisa (2017–18)	30 conversions; Lionel Cronjé (2017); 17 conversions; Louis Fouché (2016); 14 conversions; Demetri Catrakilis (2013); 6 conversions; George Whitehead (2013); 5 conversions; Pieter-Steyn de Wet (2017)	—
Most penalties by a player	37 penalties; Demetri Catrakilis (2013 Super Rugby); 20 conversions; Lionel Cronjé (2017 Super Rugby); 14 penalties; Louis Fouché (2016 Super Rugby); 7 penalties; Masixole Banda (2017–18 Pro14); 6 penalties; Masixole Banda (2018–19); Elgar Watts (2016 Super Rugby)	7 penalties; Masixole Banda (2017–18); 6 penalties; Masixole Banda (2018–19); 5 penalties; Kurt Coleman (2017–18); 4 penalties; Pieter-Steyn de Wet (2017–18); 3 penalties; Oliver Zono (2017–18)	37 penalties; Demetri Catrakilis (2013); 20 conversions; Lionel Cronjé (2017); 14 penalties; Louis Fouché (2016); 6 penalties; Elgar Watts (2016); 3 penalties; George Whitehead (2013)	—
Most drop goals by a player	2 drop goals; Lionel Cronjé (2017 Super Rugby); 1 drop goal; Demetri Catrakilis (2013 Super Rugby)	None scored	2 drop goals; Lionel Cronjé (2017); 1 drop goal; Demetri Catrakilis (2013)	—

== Player career records ==
The Southern Kings' player career records are:

Player career records
Record	Overall	Pro14	Super Rugby	Other
Most appearances	63 appearances; Schalk Ferreira (2013 to present); 43 appearances; Berton Klaasen (2017 to present); 41 appearances; Luzuko Vulindlu (2016 to 2018); 40 appearances; Andisa Ntsila (2016 to present); 34 appearances; Masixole Banda (2017 to present)	28 appearances; Berton Klaasen (2017 to present); 27 appearances; Schalk Ferreira (2017 to present); 26 appearances; Bobby de Wee (2017 to present); Yaw Penxe (2017 to present); 24 appearances; Andisa Ntsila (2017 to present)	34 appearances; Schalk Ferreira (2013 to 2017); 26 appearances; Steven Sykes (2013 to 2016); 25 appearances; Jacques Engelbrecht (2013 to 2016); Luzuko Vulindlu (2016 to 2017); 23 appearances; Chris Cloete (2016 to 2017)	5 appearances; Hannes Franklin (2011 to 2013); SP Marais (2011 to 2013); Darron Nell (2011 to 2013); Devin Oosthuizen (2011 to 2013); 4 appearances; 4 players
Most points	151 points; Demetri Catrakilis (2013); 136 points; Lionel Cronjé (2017); 112 points; Masixole Banda (2017 to present); 81 points; Louis Fouché (2016); 60 points; Yaw Penxe (2017 to present)	97 points; Masixole Banda (2017 to present); 50 points; Yaw Penxe (2017 to present); 39 points; Kurt Coleman (2017 to 2018); 30 points; Harlon Klaasen (2017 to present); 26 points; Ntabeni Dukisa (2017 to present)	142 points; Demetri Catrakilis (2013); 136 points; Lionel Cronjé (2017); 81 points; Louis Fouché (2016); 55 points; Makazole Mapimpi (2017); 40 points; Malcolm Jaer (2016 to 2017)	45 points; Louis Strydom (2011); 30 points; Siyanda Grey (2011); 18 points; Scott van Breda (2013); 9 points; Demetri Catrakilis (2013); 7 points; Mzwandile Stick (2011)
Most tries	12 tries; Yaw Penxe (2017 to present); 11 tries; Makazole Mapimpi (2017); 9 tries; Luzuko Vulindlu (2016 to 2018); 8 tries; Malcolm Jaer (2016 to 2017); 6 tries; 6 players	10 tries; Yaw Penxe (2017 to present); 6 tries; Harlon Klaasen (2017 to present); 4 tries; Bjorn Basson (2018 to present); Berton Klaasen (2017 to present); Michael Makase (2017 to present); Luzuko Vulindlu (2017 to 2018); Mike Willemse (2017 to present)	11 tries; Makazole Mapimpi (2017); 8 tries; Malcolm Jaer (2016 to 2017); 6 tries; Chris Cloete (2016 to 2017); Wandile Mjekevu (2016 to 2017); Wimpie van der Walt (2013)	6 tries; Siyanda Grey (2011); 1 try; 9 players
Most conversions	30 conversions; Lionel Cronjé (2017); 24 conversions; Masixole Banda (2017 to present); 17 conversions; Louis Fouché (2016); 14 conversions; Demetri Catrakilis (2013); 12 conversions; Kurt Coleman (2017 to 2018)	24 conversions; Masixole Banda (2017 to present); 12 conversions; Kurt Coleman (2017 to 2018); 7 conversions; Oliver Zono (2017 to present); 4 conversions; Ntabeni Dukisa (2017 to present); 3 conversions; Pieter-Steyn de Wet (2017 to 2018)	30 conversions; Lionel Cronjé (2017); 17 conversions; Louis Fouché (2016); 14 conversions; Demetri Catrakilis (2013); 6 conversions; George Whitehead (2013); 5 conversions; Pieter-Steyn de Wet (2017)	5 conversions; Louis Strydom (2011); 2 conversions; Mzwandile Stick (2011); Scott van Breda (2013)
Most penalties	40 penalties; Demetri Catrakilis (2013); 20 penalties; Lionel Cronjé (2017); 14 penalties; Louis Fouché (2016); 13 penalties; Masixole Banda (2017 to present); 10 penalties; Louis Strydom (2011)	13 penalties; Masixole Banda (2017 to present); 5 penalties; Kurt Coleman (2017 to 2018); 4 penalties; Pieter-Steyn de Wet (2017 to 2018); 3 penalties; Oliver Zono (2017 to present); 1 penalty; Ntabeni Dukisa (2017 to present)	37 penalties; Demetri Catrakilis (2013); 20 penalties; Lionel Cronjé (2017); 14 penalties; Louis Fouché (2016); 6 penalties; Elgar Watts (2016); 3 penalties; George Whitehead (2013)	10 penalties; Louis Strydom (2011); 3 penalties; Demetri Catrakilis (2013); Scott van Breda (2013); 1 penalties; Jaco van der Westhuyzen (2009)
Most drop goals	2 drop goals; Lionel Cronjé (2017); 1 drop goal; Demetri Catrakilis (2013); Mzwandile Stick (2011)	None scored	2 drop goals; Lionel Cronjé (2017); 1 drop goal; Demetri Catrakilis (2013)	1 drop goal; Mzwandile Stick (2011)

== Results per opposition ==
The Southern Kings full playing record against other teams is:

Pro14
Opposition	Played	Won	Drawn	Lost	Pts For	Pts Ag	Pts Diff	Tries For	Tries Ag	Win Perc
(Scotland) Glasgow Warriors	2	1	0	1	51	71	−20	6	11	50%
(Wales) Dragons	4	1	1	2	98	87	+11	14	10	25%
(Scotland) Edinburgh	4	1	0	3	53	144	−91	6	21	25%
(South Africa) Cheetahs	5	0	0	5	118	183	−65	15	25	0%
(Italy) Benetton	4	0	0	4	62	117	−55	9	17	0%
(Ireland) Connacht	2	0	0	2	24	63	−39	4	8	0%
(Wales) Cardiff Blues	2	0	0	2	31	71	−40	5	11	0%
(Italy) Zebre	2	0	0	2	33	75	−42	3	10	0%
(Ireland) Ulster	4	0	0	4	72	163	−91	10	24	0%
(Wales) Scarlets	4	0	0	4	88	186	−98	11	26	0%
(Wales) Ospreys	2	0	0	2	19	69	−50	3	11	0%
(Ireland) Munster	2	0	0	2	22	82	−60	3	13	0%
(Ireland) Leinster	4	0	0	4	67	192	−125	10	30	0%

Super Rugby
Opposition	Played	Won	Drawn	Lost	Pts For	Pts Ag	Pts Diff	Tries For	Tries Ag	Win Perc
(Australia) Rebels	2	2	0	0	74	30	+44	9	3	100%
(Japan) Sunwolves	2	2	0	0	70	51	+19	8	7	100%
(Australia) Force	2	1	0	1	63	56	+7	8	8	50%
(New Zealand) Highlanders	2	1	0	1	52	75	–23	6	11	50%
(Argentina) Jaguares	4	2	0	2	113	164	–51	14	20	50%
(Australia) Waratahs	2	1	0	1	36	96	–60	5	15	50%
(South Africa) Bulls	4	1	0	3	55	150	–95	5	19	25%
(South Africa) Sharks	6	1	0	5	85	226	–141	9	28	17%
(Australia) Brumbies	2	0	1	1	38	47	–9	5	5	0%
(South Africa) Cheetahs	4	0	0	4	74	115	–41	6	13	0%
(Australia) Reds	1	0	0	1	34	47	–13	5	7	0%
(New Zealand) Blues	1	0	0	1	18	34	–16	2	5	0%
(New Zealand) Hurricanes	2	0	0	2	50	88	–38	5	11	0%
(South Africa) Stormers	4	0	0	4	57	136	–79	5	17	0%
(New Zealand) Chiefs	2	0	0	2	48	93	–45	4	11	0%
(New Zealand) Crusaders	2	0	0	2	44	112	–68	5	15	0%
(South Africa) Lions	4	0	0	4	60	198	–138	9	29	0%

Other First Class games
Opposition	Played	Won	Drawn	Lost	Pts For	Pts Ag	Pts Diff	Tries For	Tries Ag	Win Perc
Portugal	1	1	0	0	39	12	+27	5	2	100%
Georgia	1	1	0	0	31	17	+14	3	2	100%
Romania	1	1	0	0	27	23	+4	2	1	100%
(South Africa) Lions	2	1	0	1	42	44	–2	4	4	50%
British & Irish Lions	1	0	0	1	8	20	–12	1	2	0%

== See also ==
- Southern Kings
- Super Rugby
- Pro14
