= 2010–11 European Challenge Cup =

2010–11 Amlin Challenge Cup
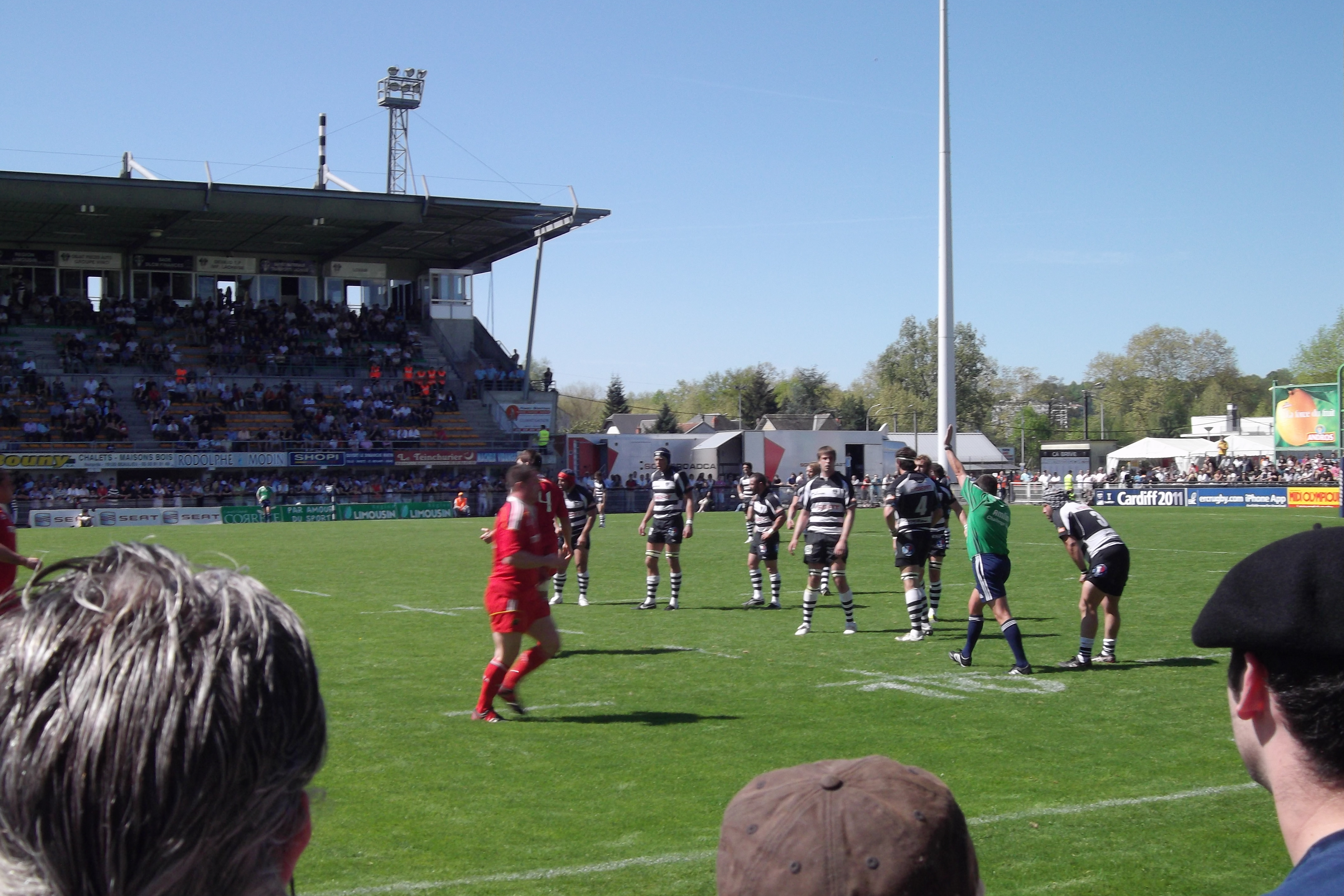
- European challenge cup 2010-11

Tournament details
- Countries: England; France; Ireland; Italy; Romania; Spain
- Tournament format(s): Round-robin and Knockout
- Date: 7 October 2010 to 20 May 2011

Tournament statistics
- Teams: 23
- Matches played: 67
- Top point scorer(s): Julien Caminati (Brive) (97 points)
- Top try scorer(s): Tom Brady (Sale); Sam Gerber (Bayonne); Nicolas Jeanjean (Brive); Nick Macleod (Sale); Pierre Rabadan (Stade Français); James Simpson-Daniel (Gloucester); Henry Trinder (Gloucester) (5 tries)

Final
- Venue: Cardiff City Stadium, Cardiff
- Champions: (England) Harlequins (3rd title)
- Runners-up: (France) Stade Français

The 2010–11 Amlin Challenge Cup was the 15th season of the European Challenge Cup, Europe's second-tier club rugby union competition, and the second to be sponsored by the British insurance company Amlin. The tournament began on 7 October 2010, with the final played on 20 May 2011 at Cardiff City Stadium, the day before the 2011 Heineken Cup Final in the same city at Millennium Stadium. A total of 23 teams from six countries participated. The competition began with 20 teams; three more teams that began their seasons in the Heineken Cup parachuted into the knockout stage. Cardiff Blues did not defend their title, as by winning the 2009–10 cup, they qualified for the 2010–11 Heineken Cup, and did not parachute into the Challenge Cup.

Harlequins claimed the title with a 19–18 win over Stade Français, becoming the first team to win the Challenge Cup three times. The victory also sent Quins into the 2011–12 Heineken Cup.

== Teams ==
The allocation of teams is as follows:

- England: 6 teams — all teams from the Aviva Premiership that did not qualify for the Heineken Cup
- France: 7 teams — all teams from the Top 14 that did not qualify for the Heineken Cup. Normally 8 teams, but Toulouse's win in the 2009–10 Heineken Cup gave France an extra place in the 2010–11 Heineken Cup.
- Italy: 4 teams — the top four teams from the 2009–10 Super 10 (now Top12) that did not move to the Celtic League for 2010–11
- Ireland: 1 team — the Irish team that failed to qualify for the Heineken Cup through the Magners League
- Spain: 1 team — the champion of the previous season's División de Honor
- Romania: 1 team specially created for the competition

| England | France | Ireland | Italy | Romania | Spain |
|---|---|---|---|---|---|
| Gloucester; Sale Sharks; Harlequins; Newcastle Falcons; Leeds Carnegie; Exeter Chiefs | Stade Français; Bourgoin; Brive; Agen; Montpellier; Bayonne; La Rochelle | Connacht | Crociati Parma; Cavalieri Prato; Petrarca Padova; Rovigo | București Oaks | El Salvador |

== Seeding ==
Teams that did not qualify for the 2010–11 Heineken Cup were ordered into four tiers according to the European Rugby Club Ranking. Five pools of four teams were drawn comprising one team from each tier.

The brackets show each team's European Rugby Club Ranking at the end of the 2009–10 season.

| Tier 1 | (France) Stade Français (8) | (England) Gloucester (13) | (England) Sale Sharks (18) | (France) Bourgoin (20) | (England) Harlequins (22) |
| Tier 2 | (England) Newcastle Falcons (25) | (France) Brive (28) | (Ireland) Connacht (31) | (France) Agen (33) | (Italy) Crociati Parma (37) |
| Tier 3 | (England) Leeds Carnegie (38) | (France) Montpellier (39) | (France) Bayonne | (Italy) Petrarca Padova | (Italy) Rovigo |
| Tier 4 | (France) La Rochelle | (Italy) Cavalieri Prato | (England) Exeter Chiefs | (Romania) București Oaks | (Spain) El Salvador |

== Pool stage ==
The draw for the pool stage took place on 9 June 2010.

Key to colours
| Winner of each pool advances to quarterfinals. Seed # in parentheses. |

=== Pool 1 ===
| Team | P | W | D | L | Tries for | Tries against | Try diff | Points for | Points against | Points diff | TB | LB | Pts |
|---|---|---|---|---|---|---|---|---|---|---|---|---|---|
| (England) Harlequins (4) | 6 | 5 | 0 | 1 | 21 | 6 | +15 | 189 | 84 | +105 | 3 | 1 | 24 |
| (Ireland) Connacht | 6 | 3 | 0 | 3 | 19 | 8 | +11 | 173 | 99 | +74 | 1 | 2 | 15 |
| (France) Bayonne | 6 | 3 | 0 | 3 | 19 | 12 | +7 | 163 | 116 | +47 | 2 | 1 | 15 |
| (Italy) Cavalieri Prato | 6 | 1 | 0 | 5 | 8 | 41 | −33 | 77 | 303 | −226 | 0 | 0 | 4 |

=== Pool 2 ===
| Team | P | W | D | L | Tries for | Tries against | Try diff | Points for | Points against | Points diff | TB | LB | Pts |
|---|---|---|---|---|---|---|---|---|---|---|---|---|---|
| (France) Brive (2) | 6 | 6 | 0 | 0 | 34 | 3 | +31 | 257 | 54 | +203 | 3 | 0 | 27 |
| (England) Sale Sharks | 6 | 4 | 0 | 2 | 39 | 4 | +35 | 279 | 58 | +221 | 4 | 1 | 21 |
| (Italy) Petrarca Padova | 6 | 1 | 0 | 5 | 10 | 26 | −16 | 88 | 213 | −125 | 1 | 1 | 6 |
| (Spain) El Salvador | 6 | 1 | 0 | 5 | 6 | 56 | −50 | 69 | 368 | −299 | 0 | 0 | 4 |

=== Pool 3 ===
| Team | P | W | D | L | Tries for | Tries against | Try diff | Points for | Points against | Points diff | TB | LB | Pts |
|---|---|---|---|---|---|---|---|---|---|---|---|---|---|
| (France) Montpellier (8) | 6 | 5 | 0 | 1 | 10 | 11 | −1 | 147 | 101 | +46 | 1 | 0 | 21 |
| (England) Exeter Chiefs | 6 | 3 | 0 | 3 | 16 | 10 | +6 | 154 | 113 | +41 | 1 | 3 | 16 |
| (France) Bourgoin | 6 | 2 | 0 | 4 | 10 | 12 | −2 | 119 | 130 | −11 | 2 | 1 | 11 |
| (England) Newcastle Falcons | 6 | 2 | 0 | 4 | 7 | 10 | −3 | 66 | 142 | −76 | 0 | 1 | 9 |

=== Pool 4 ===
| Team | P | W | D | L | Tries for | Tries against | Try diff | Points for | Points against | Points diff | TB | LB | Pts |
|---|---|---|---|---|---|---|---|---|---|---|---|---|---|
| (France) Stade Français (1) | 6 | 6 | 0 | 0 | 29 | 7 | +22 | 216 | 73 | +143 | 5 | 0 | 29 |
| (England) Leeds Carnegie | 6 | 4 | 0 | 2 | 24 | 6 | +18 | 173 | 88 | +85 | 3 | 0 | 19 |
| (Romania) București Oaks | 6 | 1 | 0 | 5 | 4 | 17 | −13 | 74 | 148 | −74 | 0 | 1 | 5 |
| (Italy) Crociati Parma | 6 | 1 | 0 | 5 | 3 | 30 | −27 | 70 | 224 | −154 | 0 | 1 | 5 |

=== Pool 5 ===
| Team | P | W | D | L | Tries for | Tries against | Try diff | Points for | Points against | Points diff | TB | LB | Pts |
|---|---|---|---|---|---|---|---|---|---|---|---|---|---|
| (France) La Rochelle (3) | 6 | 5 | 0 | 1 | 26 | 10 | +16 | 197 | 91 | +106 | 3 | 1 | 24 |
| (England) Gloucester | 6 | 4 | 0 | 2 | 35 | 7 | +28 | 255 | 77 | +178 | 3 | 2 | 21 |
| (France) Agen | 6 | 3 | 0 | 3 | 21 | 18 | +3 | 167 | 158 | +9 | 2 | 1 | 15 |
| (Italy) Rugby Rovigo | 6 | 0 | 0 | 6 | 6 | 53 | −47 | 55 | 348 | −293 | 0 | 0 | 0 |

== Knockout stage ==
=== Seeding ===
Following the end of the pool stage, the 5 pool winners were seeded alongside the top 3 2010–11 Heineken Cup pool runners-up who failed to qualify for the Heineken Cup quarter-finals.

(HC) Means a team has entered the competition from the Heineken Cup

| Seed | Team |
|---|---|
| 1 | (France) Stade Français |
| 2 | (France) Brive |
| 3 | (France) La Rochelle |
| 4 | (England) Harlequins |
| 5 (HC) | (England) London Wasps |
| 6 (HC) | (France) Clermont |
| 7 (HC) | (Ireland) Munster |
| 8 | (France) Montpellier |

=== Quarter-finals ===
The quarter-finals were decided based on the above seeding. All game times are local.

7 April 2011
20.45

| La Rochelle (France) | 13–23 | (France) Clermont |
| Try: Goosen 63' c Con: Goosen (1/1); Pen: Goosen (2/4) 7', 17' | Report | Try: Rougerie 13' c Murimurivalu 71' c Con: James (2/2); Pen: James (3/6) 3', 28', 76' |

Stade Marcel-Deflandre, La Rochelle
Attendance: 8,500
Referee: George Clancy (Ireland)

8 April 2011
20.45

| Stade Français (France) | 32–28 | (France) Montpellier |
| Try: Southwell 26' c Rabadan 30' m Penalty try 53' c Burban 59' c Con: Dupuy (1/2); Beauxis (2/2); Pen: Beauxis (2) 50', 67' | Report | Try: Chkhaidze 9' c Con: Paillaugue (1/1); Pen: Paillaugue (3) 7', 12' 21'; Lagarde (4) 35', 48', 61', 63' |

Stade Charléty, Paris
Attendance: 7,000
Referee: Alan Lewis (Ireland)

8 April 2011
19.45

| Harlequins (England) | 32–22 | (England) London Wasps |
| Try: Care 1' c Fa'asavalu 4' c Con: Evans (2/2); Pen: Evans (5/5) 28', 35', 40', 46', 59'; Drop: Evans 76' | Report | Try: Jewell 11' c Lindsay 51' c Haughton 71' m Con: Walder (2/3); Drop: Walder 24' |

Twickenham Stoop, London
Attendance: 8,565
Referee: Christophe Berdos (France)

9 April 2011
14.00

| Brive (France) | 37–42 | (Ireland) Munster |
| Try: Uys 17' c Estebanez 20' c Palisson 70' c Perry 80' c Con: Belie (4/4) 17',20',80',70'; Pen: Belie 10',36',45' | Report | Try: Howlett (2) 1' c, 22' c Earls (2) 4' c, 46' c Stringer 50' c Con: O'Gara (4/5); Pen: O'Gara (3/3) 53', 66', 68' |

Stade Amédée-Domenech, Brive-la-Gaillarde
Attendance: 8,500
Referee: Dave Pearson (England)

=== Semi-finals ===
The draw for the semi-finals of both the Heineken Cup and Amlin Challenge Cup took place after the Pool 6 Heinieken Cup match between London Wasps and Toulouse on 23 January 2011. The draw was conducted in the Sky Sports booth by Ieuan Evans and Jean-Pierre Lux, Chairman of ERC, at Adams Park, High Wycombe.

In last season's Challenge Cup, any semi-final that involved a club that started the season in the Challenge Cup and a club that started in the Heineken Cup would be hosted by the club that started in the Challenge Cup. This rule was abandoned for 2010–11; the home club in each semi-final is now determined strictly by the draw.

29 April 2011
20:45

| Stade Français (France) | 29–25 | (France) Clermont |
| Try: Arias 21' c Boussès 65' c Con: Beauxis (2/2); Pen: Beauxis (5/7) 12', 27', 32', 36', 56' | Report | Try: Pisi 16' c Russell 48' c Cudmore 76' m Con: Parra (2/3); Pen: Parra (2/5) 14', 46' |

Stade Charléty, Paris
Attendance: 6,712
Referee: Nigel Owens (Wales)

30 April 2011
13:00

| Munster (Ireland) | 12–20 | (England) Harlequins |
| Try: Jones 40' c Howlett 78' m Con: O'Gara (1/2) | Report | Try: Robson 9' c Care 34' c Con: Evans (1/1); Care (1/1); Pen: Clegg (2/2) 49', 59' |

Thomond Park, Limerick
Attendance: 24,907
Referee: Romain Poite (France)

=== Final ===
The final of the Amlin Challenge Cup took place at Cardiff City Stadium on 20 May 2011. Harlequins won the trophy for the third time with a 19–18 victory over Stade Francais.

20 May 2011
19.45

| Harlequins (England) | 19–18 | (France) Stade Français |
| Try: Camacho 76' c Con: Evans (1/1); Pen: Evans (4/5) 6', 16', 27', 66' | Report | Pen: Beauxis (4/5) 12', 32', 46', 57'; Drop: Bastareaud (1/1) 47'; Rodríguez (1/2) 72' |

Cardiff City Stadium, Cardiff
Attendance: 12,236
Referee: George Clancy (Ireland)

== Individual statistics ==
=== Top points scorers ===
| Player | Team | Points |
|---|---|---|
| (France) Julien Caminati | (France) Brive | 97 |
| (New Zealand) Nick Evans | (England) Harlequins | 94 |
| (Ireland) Ian Keatley | (Ireland) Connacht | 71 |
| (France) Raphaël Lagarde | (France) Montpellier | 65 |
| (England) Freddie Burns | (England) Gloucester | 64 |
| (Wales) Nick Macleod | (England) Sale Sharks | 58 |
| (France) Lionel Beauxis | (France) Stade Français | 53 |
| (England) Rob Miller | (England) Sale Sharks | 48 |
| (England) Ryan Davis | (England) Exeter Chiefs | 47 |
| (South Africa) Greg Goosen | (France) La Rochelle | 47 |

=== Top try scorers ===
| Player | Team | Tries |
|---|---|---|
| (England) Tom Brady | (England) Sale Sharks | 5 |
| (South Africa) Sam Gerber | (France) Bayonne | 5 |
| (France) Nicolas Jeanjean | (France) Brive | 5 |
| (Wales) Nick Macleod | (England) Sale Sharks | 5 |
| (France) Pierre Rabadan | (France) Stade Français | 5 |
| (England) James Simpson-Daniel | (England) Gloucester | 5 |
| (England) Henry Trinder | (England) Gloucester | 5 |
| (France) Julien Caminati | (France) Brive | 4 |
| (France) Jonathan Elgoyhen | (France) Brive | 4 |
| (Samoa) Henry Fa'afili | (England) Leeds | 4 |
