= James Polkinghorne (footballer) =

Australian rules footballer

Personal information
- Full name: James Polkinghorne
- Born: 21 January 1989 (age 37)
- Original team: Calder Cannons (TAC Cup)
- Draft: No. 41, 2007 National Draft, Brisbane Lions
- Height: 184 cm (6 ft 0 in)
- Weight: 87 kg (192 lb)
- Position: Midfielder / Forward

Playing career^{1}
Years	Club	Games (Goals)
2008–2014	Brisbane Lions	94 (53)
2016	Essendon	7 (1)
Total		101 (54)
- ^{1} Playing statistics correct to the end of 2016.

James Polkinghorne (born 21 January 1989) is a former professional Australian rules footballer who played with the Brisbane Lions and Essendon Football Club in the Australian Football League (AFL).

Polkinghorne leaping ability has been linked to his volleyball background with St. Bernard's College and for the U15 Victorian schoolboys side.

Polkinghorne is a high possession winner and utility player who excels at the stoppages. He represented Vic Metro at the NAB AFL U18 Championships. In 2007 he made his senior debut with Coburg in the Victorian Football League (VFL) as part of a trial program. Runner-up in the Calder Cannons' Best and Fairest award for 2007, he is the son of former Hawthorn player Robert Polkinghorne, nephew of Hawks star David Polkinghorne.

Polkinghorne made his debut in round 6, 2008 at the Gabba against Melbourne.

Polkinghorne received considerable media attention for kicking a match winning torpedo goal from backward of the centre square in the dying minutes of Brisbane's round 10, 2012 victory over ladder leaders West Coast.

He was delisted by the Lions at the end of the 2014 season.

In February 2015, Polkinghorne was given a short-term contract by Essendon to play in the 2015 NAB Challenge as a "top-up" player, due to 26 Essendon players withdrawing from the NAB Challenge because of the ongoing Essendon Football Club supplements controversy.

In January 2016, he signed with Essendon as a top-up player.

== Statistics ==
Legend
G	Goals	K	Kicks	D	Disposals	T	Tackles
B	Behinds	H	Handballs	M	Marks

Season	Team	No.	Games	Totals							Averages (per game)						
Season	Team	No.	Games	G	B	K	H	D	M	T	G	B	K	H	D	M	T
2008	Brisbane Lions	31	4	0	2	10	12	22	10	10	0.0	0.5	2.5	3.0	5.5	2.5	2.5
2009	Brisbane Lions	31	20	15	9	111	105	216	86	48	0.8	0.5	5.6	5.3	10.8	4.3	2.4
2010	Brisbane Lions	31	15	6	4	79	126	205	48	50	0.4	0.3	5.3	8.4	13.7	3.2	3.3
2011	Brisbane Lions	31	22	14	17	193	158	351	69	83	0.6	0.8	8.8	7.2	16.0	3.1	3.8
2012	Brisbane Lions	31	20	13	8	173	106	279	66	47	0.7	0.4	8.7	5.3	14.0	3.3	2.4
2013	Brisbane Lions	31	11	5	5	88	74	162	38	12	0.5	0.5	8.0	6.7	14.7	3.5	1.1
2014	Brisbane Lions	31	2	0	0	9	9	18	2	5	0.0	0.0	4.5	4.5	9.0	1.0	2.5
2016	Essendon	50	7	1	3	38	67	105	24	7	0.1	0.4	5.4	9.6	15.0	3.4	1.0
Career			101	54	48	701	657	1358	343	262	0.5	0.5	6.9	6.5	13.4	3.4	2.6
