= 2013 SARU Community Cup =

- Countries: South Africa
- Date: 16 February – 1 April 2013
- Champions: Despatch
- Runners-up: College Rovers
- Matches played: 52
- Tries scored: 482 (average 9.3 per match)
- Top point scorer: Charl Nieuwenhuis (125)
- Top try scorer: Ruan van Loo; Gerrit Theron (8)

The 2013 SARU Community Cup (known as the 2013 Cell C Community Cup for sponsorship reasons) was the first season of the SARU Community Cup competition and was contested from 16 February to 1 April 2013. The tournament is the top competition for non-university rugby union clubs in South Africa.

== Competition ==
=== Format ===
Twenty teams qualified for the Community Cup from the club leagues of the fourteen provincial unions in South Africa. The league winners all qualified, as well as six wildcard teams chosen by SARU.

The format of the Community Cup was exactly the same as the Rugby World Cup. The teams were divided into four pools, each containing five teams each. They would then play four pool games, playing other teams in their respective pools once each. Each team played two home games and two away games.

The winner and runner-up of each pool entered the play-off stage, held at a central venue over the Easter long weekend each year. The play-offs consisted of quarter finals, semi-finals and the final. The winner of each pool met the runner-up of a different pool in a quarter final. The winner of each quarter-final progressed to the semi-finals and the semi-final winners to the final, held at a neutral venue.

The losing semi-finalists played each other in the Plate final. The losing quarter finalists met in the Bowl semi-final, the winners of which played in the Bowl final, while the losers played in the Shield final.

== Teams ==
The following teams were named by SARU as participants in the 2013 SARU Community Cup:

Location of teams in the 2013 SARU Community Cup
Pool A
Pool B
Pool C
Pool D
Location of Gauteng-based teams in 2013 SARU Community Cup
Pool A
Pool B
Pool C
Pool D
Location of Western Cape-based teams in 2013 SARU Community Cup
Pool A
Pool B
Pool C
Pool D

=== Team Listing ===
Team	Sponsored Name	Union	Entry Type
African Bombers	African Bombers	Eastern Province Kings	Wildcard
Bloemfontein Crusaders	Bloemfontein Crusaders	Free State Cheetahs	Wildcard
Bloemfontein Police	Bloemfontein Police	Free State Cheetahs	champion
Brakpan	East Rand Cranes Brakpan	Falcons	champion
College Rovers	Jonsson College Rovers	Sharks	champion
Despatch	GAP Despatch	Eastern Province Kings	champion
Durbanville-Bellville	Durbanville-Bellville	Western Province	champion
Evergreens	Evergreens	SWD Eagles	champion
Noordelikes	BB Truck Noordelikes	Limpopo Blue Bulls	champion
Old Selbornians	Broubart Old Selbornians	Border Bulldogs	champion
Pretoria Police	Pretoria Police	Blue Bulls	champion
Raiders	Raiders	Golden Lions	Wildcard
Roodepoort	Roodepoort	Golden Lions	champion
Roses United	Roses United	Boland Cavaliers	Wildcard
Rustenburg Impala	Rustenburg Impala	Leopards	champion
Sishen	Aveng Moolmans Sishen	Griquas	champion
SK Walmers	SK Walmers	Western Province	Wildcard
Villagers Worcester	United Bulk Villagers Worcester	Boland Cavaliers	champion
Welkom Rovers	Welkom Rovers	Griffons	champion
White River	White River	Pumas	champion

== Pool stages ==
On 22 November 2012, the draw was made for the 2013 SARU Community Cup and the 20 teams were drawn in the 4 pools.

=== Pool A ===
==== Log ====
2013 SARU Community Cup Pool A Log
Position	Team	Played	Won	Drawn	Lost	Points For	Points Against	Points Difference	Tries For	Tries Against	Try Bonus	Losing Bonus	Points
1	College Rovers	4	4	0	0	165	76	+89	23	9	4	0	20
2	Despatch	4	3	0	1	151	113	+38	21	13	3	0	15
3	SK Walmers	4	2	0	2	138	125	+13	17	15	3	1	12
4	Villagers Worcester	4	1	0	3	90	179	–89	9	25	0	0	4
5	Sishen	4	0	0	4	96	147	–51	13	21	1	2	3
The top 2 teams will qualify for the finals. Points breakdown: *4 points for a win *2 points for a draw *1 bonus point for a loss by seven points or less *1 bonus point for scoring four or more tries in a match

==== Fixtures and results ====
===== Round one =====
16 February 2013	College Rovers	38 – 17	Despatch	KP3, Kings Park, Durban
14:30	Try: Murray Bondesio 5'; Tian Meyer 51'; Sergio Lorenzo Torrens 63'; Kyle Claude Wilkinson 76'; Con: Jors Dannhauser 6', 52', 64' (3/4); Pen: Greg Goosen 17' (1/1); Jors Dannhauser 24', 47', 61' (3/3); Cards: Murray Bondesio (yellow card) 36' to 47'	Scoreboard	Try: Monty Dumond 44'; Basil de Doncker 65'; Con: Monty Dumond 45', 65' (2/2); Pen: Monty Dumond 40' (1/4); Cards: Jaco Swanepoel (yellow card) 61' to 71'	Referee: Stuart Berry

16 February 2013	Villagers Worcester	24 – 20	Sishen	Esselen Park, Worcester
15:00	Try: Freginald Africa 39'; Jowayne van Wyk 41'; Cliven Malies 80'; Con: Yazeed Johnson 40', 42' (2/2); Jaylen Byron Keith Fortune 80' (1/1); Pen: Yazeed Johnson 76' (1/3); Cards: David Elton Wehr (yellow card) 25' to 36'	Scoreboard	Try: Johan Peens 32'; Lihan Cornelius Johannes du Plessis 70'; Gert Cloete 75'; Con: Tiaan Botha le Roux 33' (1/3); Pen: Tiaan Botha le Roux 9' (1/1)	Attendance: 1,500; Referee: Francois Pretorius

Bye/s: SK Walmers

===== Round two =====
23 February 2013	Sishen	24 – 54	College Rovers	Sivos Rugby Stadium, Kathu
16:00	Try: Tiaan Botha Le Roux 52'; Stevie Meyer 67'; Viljoen van der Linde 81'; Con: Tiaan Botha Le Roux 53', 68', 82' (3/3); Pen: Tiaan Botha Le Roux 21' (1/1); Cards: Johan Peens (yellow card) 30' to 40' (red card) 45'	Scoreboard	Try: Mark Jonathan Goosen 4'; Jors Dannhauser 35'; Andrew Borgen 49'; Chris Jordaan 55'; Sergio Lorenzo Torrens 58'; Conraf Stoltz 62'; Wade Dean Elliot 75'; Nikolai Shamako Blignaut 79'; Con: Greg Goosen (0/1); Jors Dannhauser 36' (1/1); Pen: Jors Dannhauser 27' (1/1); Greg Goosen (0/1); Cards: Gideon Jacobus Bruwer (yellow card) 30' to 40'

23 February 2013	SK Walmers	49 – 26	Villagers Worcester	Green Point Track, Cape Town
16:00	Try: Adnaan Osman 15'; Danwill Erasmus 39'; Wilton Pietersen 43'; Craig Pheiffer 74'; Con: Adnaan Osman 16', 40', 44', 50', 82' (5/6); Pen: Adnaan Osman 21', 38', 57' (3/4)	Scoreboard	Try: Eduardo Fourie 45'; David Elton Wehr 54'; Con: Jaylen Byron Keith Fortune 46', 55' (2/2); Pen: Jaylen Byron Keith Fortune 4', 13', 19', 33' (4/5)

Bye/s: Despatch

===== Round three =====
2 March 2013	Despatch	67 – 23	Villagers Worcester	WJ de Wet Stadium, Despatch
16:00	Try: Ayanda Nogampula 6'; Baldwin McBean 16'; Bobby Dyer 25'; Billy Mintoor 32'; Ashley Viviers 42'; Elroy Ligman 78'; Deon Booysen 80'; Con: Ryan Brown 7', 17', 26', 36', 43', 51' (6/8); Deon Booysen 80' (1/1); Pen: Ryan Brown 9' (1/1); Cards: Ashley Viviers (yellow card) 20' to 30'	Scoreboard	Try: Jovelian de Koker 47'; Eduardo Fourie 61'; Con: Jaylen Byron Keith Fortune 48', 62' (2/2); Pen: Jaylen Byron Keith Fortune 4', 10', 38' (3/4)	Attendance: 1,000; Referee: Rodney Boneparte

2 March 2013	Sishen	32 – 39	SK Walmers	Sivos Rugby Stadium, Kathu
16:00	Try: Adolf Johannes du Plessis 36'; Arnold Johannes Coetzee 42'; Stevie Meyer 49'; Charlton Anico McCarthy 78'; Con: Tiaan Botha Le Roux 37', 43', 50' (3/4); Pen: Tiaan Botha Le Roux 21' (1/1); Andre Gerhard Roberts (0/1)	Scoreboard	Try: Jody David Burch 39'; Danwill Erasmus 60'; Zhahier Ryland 62'; Con: Adnaan Osman 40', 61', 63', 74' (4/5); Pen: Adnaan Osman 11', 20' (2/3); Cards: Moegamat Davids (yellow card) 29' to 39'	Attendance: 1,000; Referee: Nico Schmahl

Bye/s: College Rovers

===== Round four =====
9 March 2013	College Rovers	30 – 18	SK Walmers	KP3, Kings Park, Durban
15:00	Try: Sergio Lorenzo Torrens 15'; Nikolai Shamako Blignaut 23'; Wandile Mjekevu 38'; Con: Jors Dannhauser 27', 38' (2/4); Pen: Jors Dannhauser 12' (1/1); Greg Goosen 67' (1/1)	Scoreboard	Try: Zhahier Ryland 35'; Mogamad Johnson 71'; Con: Adnaan Osman 35' (1/2); Pen: Adnaan Osman 3', 26' (2/4); Cards: Zhahier Ryland (yellow card) 21' to 32'	Attendance: 1,000; Referee: Archie Sehlako

9 March 2013	Despatch	30 – 20	Sishen	WJ de Wet Stadium, Despatch
15:00	Try: Billy Mintoor; Jaco Bekker; Baldwin McBean; Bobby Dyer; Con: Ryan Brown (1/1); Elroy Ligman (1/1); Pen: Ryan Brown (2/2)	Scoreboard	Try: Hendrik Ockert Olivier; Byron Booysen; Con: Andre Gerhard Roberts (1/1); Pen: Andre Gerhard Roberts (1/1)	Referee: Mark Norris

Bye/s: Villagers Worcester

===== Round Five =====
16 March 2013	SK Walmers	32 – 37	Despatch	Green Point Track, Cape Town
16:00	Try: Adnaan Osman 33'; Zhahier Ryland 63'; Danwill Erasmus 73'; Con: Adnaan Osman 63', 74', 81' (3/4); Pen: Adnaan Osman 14', 41' (2/2)	Scoreboard	Try: Billy Mintoor 46', 52'; Ryan Brown 55'; Baldwin McBean 67'; Elroy Ligman 68'; Con: Ryan Brown 46', 53', 56' (3/3); Monty Dumond (0/1); Pen: Ryan Brown 3', 36' (2/2)	Referee: François Groenewald

16 March 2013	Villagers Worcester	17 – 43	College Rovers	Boland Park, Worcester
16:00	Try: Yazeed Johnson 54'; Jovelian de Koker 78'; Con: Yazeed Johnson 55', 79' (2/2); Pen: Yazeed Johnson 21' (1/3); Cards: Fagil Alvandria Hendricks (yellow card) 39'	Scoreboard	Try: Chris Jordaan 16'; Wandile Mjekevu 37'; Zomuhle Mphakamiseni Mbona 67'; Conrad Stoltz 2'; Con: Greg Goosen 17', 38' (2/2); Christopher Ian Micklewood 45' (1/1); Pen: Greg Goosen 28' (1/1); Cards: Francois Robertse (yellow card) 31'	Referee: Cwengile Jadezweni

Bye/s: Sishen

=== Pool B ===
==== Log ====
2013 SARU Community Cup Pool B Log
Position	Team	Played	Won	Drawn	Lost	Points For	Points Against	Points Difference	Tries For	Tries Against	Try Bonus	Losing Bonus	Points
1	Pretoria Police	4	4	0	0	219	96	+123	31	13	4	0	20
2	Durbanville-Bellville	4	3	0	1	262	81	+181	40	11	4	0	16
3	African Bombers	4	2	0	2	128	143	–15	17	22	3	0	11
4	Welkom Rovers	4	1	0	3	89	202	–113	9	27	2	0	6
5	Bloemfontein Police	4	0	0	4	76	252	–176	12	36	0	0	0
The top 2 teams will qualify for the finals. Points breakdown: *4 points for a win *2 points for a draw *1 bonus point for a loss by seven points or less *1 bonus point for scoring four or more tries in a match

==== Fixtures and results ====
===== Round one =====
16 February 2013	Pretoria Police	35 – 26	Durbanville-Bellville	Pretoria College, Pretoria
15:00	Try: Ruan van Loo 6', 26'; Louis van Biljon 40'; Michael Nienaber 58'; Con: Dillon Laubscher 7', 27', 40' (3/4); Pen: Dillon Laubscher 17', 23', 78' (3/3)	Scoreboard	Try: Marthinus Renier Keyser 4'; Divan Batt 42'; Raynor Becker 43'; Jody Tylon Reyneke 66'; Con: Theuns Kotzé 5', 42', 44' (3/4); Pen: Theuns Kotzé (0/1)	Attendance: 500; Referee: Jan Hendrik Venter

16 February 2013	African Bombers	35 – 22	Welkom Rovers	Zwide Stadium, Ibhayi
15:00	Try: Milo Nqoro 35'; Mbembe Payi 60', 73'; Con: Masixole Banda 36' (1/3); Pen: Masixole Banda 6', 8', 13', 23', 81', 83' (6/6); Cards: Lonwabo Jam (yellow card) 30' to 40'	Scoreboard	Try: Jaco Pretorius 31'; Hendrik Johannes Prinsloo 70'; Jacobus Marthinus Aucamp 79'; Con: Petrus Johannes Christiaan Strydom 32', 71' (2/3); Pen: Petrus Johannes Christiaan Strydom 77' (1/1)	Attendance: 500; Referee: Tahla Ntshakaza

Bye/s: Bloemfontein Police

===== Round two =====
23 February 2013	Durbanville-Bellville	45 – 26	African Bombers	Durbanville-Bellville Rugby Club, Cape Town
15:00	Try: Divan Batt 16'; Gerrit Theron 20'; Theuns Kotzé 31'; Raynor Becker 40'; Alconray Botha 44'; Marthinus Renier Keyser 78'; Con: Theuns Kotzé 17', 32', 40', 45' (4/4); Raymond Olivier (0/1); Liaan Scriven (0/1)	Scoreboard	Try: Sizwe Twani 24'; Siyabonga Moabi 35'; Athenkosi Manentsa 65'; Luyanda Sidumo 76'; Con: Masixole Banda 25', 66', 77' (3/4)

23 February 2013	Welkom Rovers	43 – 20	Bloemfontein Police	Rovers Rugby Club, Welkom
17:30	Try: Nicolaas Pretorius 36', 40'; Willem Petrus Van Vuuren 56'; Con: Petrus Johannes Christiaan Strydom 10', 37', 57', 78' (4/4); Pen: Petrus Johannes Christiaan Strydom 17', 48', 54' (3/4); Drop: Petrus Johannes Christiaan Strydom 8', 50' (2/2)	Scoreboard	Try: Cornelius De Villiers 21', 66'; Shaun Rheeder 75'; Con: Isak Job 22' (1/1); Franco van der Merwe (0/1); Pen: Isak Job 45' (1/1); Cards: Francois Bezuidenhout (yellow card) 38' to 48'

Bye/s: Pretoria Police

===== Round three =====
2 March 2013	Bloemfontein Police	20 – 95	Durbanville-Bellville	Bobbies Park, Bloemfontein
16:00	Try: Cornelius de Villiers 28'; Gerhard Slabber 40'; Michael Taylor 60'; Con: Isak Job (0/1); Frank Ferreira 40' (1/1); Pen: Isak Job 22' (1/1)	Scoreboard	Try: Gerrit Theron 4'; Raynor Becker 14'; Raymond Olivier 26'; Marthinus Renier Keyser 43'; Alconray Botha 50'; Edwin Sass 52'; Jody Reyneke 62'; Sinethemba Zweni 69'; Carel du Preez 74'; Con: Theuns Kotzé 15', 27', 32', 34' (4/5); Tiaan Radyn 44' (1/1); Liaan Scriven (0/1); Raymond Olivier 56' (1/1)	Attendance: 500; Referee: Oregopotse Rametsi

2 March 2013	African Bombers	33 – 53	Pretoria Police	Zwide Stadium, Ibhayi
16:00	Try: Mbembe Payi 5'; Sizwe Twani 18'; Masixoli Screech 24'; Loyiso Bopi 42'; Athenkosi Manentsa 58'; Con: Masixole Banda 6' (1/5); Pen: Masixole Banda 9', 34' (2/2)	Scoreboard	Try: Ruan van Loo 1'; Michael Nienaber 15'; Louis van Biljon 38'; Heinrich Rademeyer 48'; Pieter Johannes Strydom 76'; Con: Dillon Laubscher 2', 37', 49', 70' (4/7); Michael Pienaar 77' (1/1); Pen: Dillon Laubscher 3' (1/1)	Attendance: 1,000; Referee: Christie du Preez

Bye/s: Welkom Rovers

===== Round four =====
9 March 2013	Welkom Rovers	20 – 51	Pretoria Police	Rovers Rugby Club, Welkom
16:30	Try: Lieb Cornelius van Tonder 77'; Con: Ricardo Santos (0/1); Pen: Petrus Johannes Christiaan Strydom 5', 45', 53', 61' (4/4); Drop: Willem Petrus Van Vuuren 9' (1/1); Cards: Ryno Venter (yellow card) 21' to 31'	Scoreboard	Try: Ruan van Loo 10'; Hendrik van der Nest 23'; Louis van Biljon 33'; Nico Luus 64'; Heinrich Rademeyer 67'; Dolph Nel 75'; Jerry Sefoko 79'; Con: Dillon Laubscher 11', 24', 34', 68', 80' (5/7); Pen: Dillon Laubscher 2', 58' (2/2); Cards: Hendrik van der Nest (yellow card) 53'; Ruan van Loo (yellow card) 61'	Attendance: 200; Referee: Wilko Esterhuizen

9 March 2013	Bloemfontein Police	19 – 34	African Bombers	Bobbies Park, Bloemfontein
16:00	Try: Frans Mortlock 8'; Frank Ferreira 47'; Michael Taylor 65'; Con: Frank Ferreira 48', 66' (2/3); Cards: Shaun Rheeder (yellow card) 37' to 48'	Scoreboard	Try: Mbembe Payi 22'; Lumko Jiyane David Mbane 28'; Lonwabo Jam 58'; Athenkosi Manentsa 74'; Lindile Mbatsha 78'; Con: Masixole Banda 23', 29' (2/4); Mbembe Payi 79' (1/1); Pen: Masixole Banda 1' (1/1); Cards: Lumko Jiyane David Mbane (yellow card) 62' to 73'	Attendance: 200; Referee: Pieter Janse van Vuuren

Bye/s: Durbanville-Bellville

===== Round Five =====
16 March 2013	Pretoria Police	80 – 17	Bloemfontein Police	SAPS Training Academy, Pretoria
16:00	Try: Pieter Johannes Strydom 4'; Michael Nienaber 10'; Nico Luus 13'; Corné la Grange 19'; Pieter van der Nest 28'; Mulaleni Alfred Khoza 32'; Sibongile Njomba 37'; Ruan van Loo 46'; Heinrich Rademeyer 49'; Louis van Biljon 74'; Gerhard Andries du Preez 76'; Con: Michael Pienaar 5', 11', 14', 19', 32', 38' (6/8); Heinrich Rademeyer 50' (1/1); Dillon Laubscher 67' (1/1)	Scoreboard	Try: Cornelius de Villiers 40'; Frank Ferreira 60'; Frans Mortlock 69'; Con: Frank Ferreira (0/2); Bennie Gouws 69' (1/1); Pen: Franco van der Merwe (0/1); Cards: Louis Nel (yellow card) 74'	Referee: Lihan Pretorius

16 March 2013	Durbanville-Bellville	96 – 0	Welkom Rovers	Durbanville-Bellville Rugby Club, Cape Town
16:30	Try: Morne Meningke 4'; Gerrit Theron 13'; Raymond Olivier 17'; Sinethemba Zweni 24'; Quinten Coetzer 41'; Alconray Botha 50'; Johannes Izak Adolf Saayman 70'; Tiaan Radyn 74'; Con: Raynor Becker 5', 14', 18', 25', 27', 35', 42', 51' (8/9); Tiaan Radyn 62' (1/1); Cards: JP Prinsloo (yellow card) 55' to 65'	Scoreboard	Cards: Willem Petrus van Vuuren (yellow card) 12' to 22'; Alex van Staden (yellow card) 64'	Referee: Juan Sylvestre

Bye/s: African Bombers

=== Pool C ===
==== Log ====
2013 SARU Community Cup Pool C Log
Position	Team	Played	Won	Drawn	Lost	Points For	Points Against	Points Difference	Tries For	Tries Against	Try Bonus	Losing Bonus	Points
1	Rustenburg Impala	4	3	1	0	192	77	+115	26	9	2	0	16
2	Roodepoort	4	3	0	1	158	91	+67	21	11	2	0	14
3	Raiders	4	2	1	1	132	75	+57	17	7	3	1	14
4	Bloemfontein Crusaders	4	1	0	3	77	153	–76	10	23	1	0	5
5	Noordelikes	4	0	0	4	74	237	–163	11	35	1	0	1
The top 2 teams will qualify for the finals. Points breakdown: *4 points for a win *2 points for a draw *1 bonus point for a loss by seven points or less *1 bonus point for scoring four or more tries in a match

==== Fixtures and results ====
===== Round one =====
16 February 2013	Rustenburg Impala	24 – 13	Roodepoort	Rustenburg Rugby Fields, Rustenburg
15:00	Try: Hendrik Heyser 33'; Duane Jordaan 43'; Con: Naas Olivier 34' (1/2); Pen: Naas Olivier 24', 40', 41' (3/4); Chanley Williams (0/1); Cards: Nathan Neal Fourie (yellow card) 52' to 62'	Scoreboard	Try: Jessie Geyers 54'; Con: Hendrik Gerhardus Oosthuizen 55' (1/1); Pen: Steven Griffiths 14', 20' (2/3); Drop: Steven Griffiths (0/2)	Attendance: 1,000; Referee: Eduan Nel

16 February 2013	Noordelikes	12 – 45	Raiders	Noordelikes Rugby Club, Polokwane
15:00	Try: Everard Bye 50', 60'; Con: Zander Byleveldt 60' (1/2)	Scoreboard	Try: Jama Ntengo 4'; Jimmy Baloyi 5'; Dean Swart 20'; Ryno Hendrikz 65'; Carlo Marko Moodie 75'; Con: Shaun Ryan Davids 4', 6', 66', 76' (4/5); Pen: Shaun Ryan Davids 10', 14', 17', 71' (4/4)	Attendance: 450; Referee: Pieter Maritz

Bye/s: Bloemfontein Crusaders

===== Round two =====
23 February 2013	Roodepoort	84 – 28	Noordelikes	Rand Leases Sport Ground, Roodepoort
15:00	Try: Leander Rademeyer 2'; Gerhard Scholtz 10'; Hendrik Gerhardus Oosthuizen 23'; Thys de Villiers 35'; Wesley Pretorius 38'; Gareth Hemingway 40'; Cliffie Vermaak 67'; André Esterhuizen 76'; Keith Murray 78'; Byron Godfrey 81'; Con: Steven Griffiths 11', 23', 40', 44', 68', 72', 73', 79' (8/13); Pen: Steven Griffiths 20' (1/1)	Scoreboard	Try: Wouter de Villiers 21'; Francois Lottering 25'; Everard Bye 53'; Mynhardt Smith 58'; Con: Zander Byleveldt 21', 25', 54', 59' (4/4); Pen: Zander Byleveldt (0/1)

23 February 2013	Raiders	33 – 6	Bloemfontein Crusaders	Bill Jardine Stadium, Johannesburg
16:00	Try: Gustav Gerhard De Vos 6'; Dean Swart 9'; Ryno Hendrikz 66'; Ashwill Adams 76'; Con: Anvor Schooney 7' (1/1); Shaun Ryan Davids 10' (1/1); Pen: Anvor Schooney (0/2); Cards: Shadie Goverdersammy (yellow card) 59' to 69'	Scoreboard	Pen: Griffon Duncan Colby 14', 35' (2/2); Cards: Melvin Garth Verwant (yellow card) 32' to 42'

Bye/s: Rustenburg Impala

===== Round three =====
2 March 2013	Rustenburg Impala	69 – 17	Bloemfontein Crusaders	Rustenburg Rugby Fields, Rustenburg
16:00	Try: Duane Jordaan 1'; Wendal Wehr 8'; Jackie Du Toit 12'; Chanley Williams 42'; Willem Kok 61'; Leon Andries du Plessis 64'; Alfred Ries 77'; Con: Naas Olivier 2', 9', 13', 61', 65', 73', 74', 78' (8/10); Pen: Naas Olivier 3' (1/1); Cards: Musa Tukela (yellow card) 69' to 79'	Scoreboard	Try: Vincent Maruping 62'; Herchell Johnson 79'; Con: Griffon Duncan Colby 63', 79' (2/2); Pen: Blaine Rodger Mkhwanazi Thlapane 5' (1/2); Cards: Randall Nelson (yellow card) 44'; Ivor Jordan (yellow card) 53'	Attendance: 400; Referee: Nic Rocono

2 March 2013	Roodepoort	27 – 24	Raiders	Rand Leases Sport Ground, Roodepoort
16:00	Try: Byron Godfrey 49'; Gareth Hemingway 51'; Con: Steven Griffiths 49' (1/2); Pen: Steven Griffiths 4', 19' (2/2); Hendrik Gerhardus Oosthuizen (0/1); Drop: Steven Griffiths 76' (1/1); Cards: Junior Gray (yellow card) 73'	Scoreboard	Try: Dean Swart 15'; Tyson Mulamba 74'; Francois Benjamin 78'; Con: Shaun Ryan Davids 15', 75', 78' (3/3); Pen: Shaun Ryan Davids (0/1); Anvor Schooney 29' (1/1); Drop: Shaun Ryan Davids (0/1)	Attendance: 2,000; Referee: Renier Vermeulen

Bye/s: Noordelikes

===== Round four =====
9 March 2013	Bloemfontein Crusaders	15 – 34	Roodepoort	Clive Solomon Stadium, Heidedal
16:00	Try: Jason Horne 5'; Griffon Duncan Colby 39'; Con: Blaine Rodger Mkhwanazi Thlapane 40' (1/2); Drop: Egan Duran Gysman 23' (1/1)	Scoreboard	Try: Lesego Daniel Malau 20'; Senna Esterhuizen 27'; Thys de Villiers 43'; Adrian Jacobs 53'; Juan Fouché 68'; Con: Steven Griffiths 28', 44', 69' (3/5); Pen: Steven Griffiths 10' (1/2); Cards: André Esterhuizen (yellow card) 33' to 44'	Attendance: 1,000; Referee: Lihan Pretorius

9 March 2013	Noordelikes	17 – 69	Rustenburg Impala	Noordelikes Rugby Club, Polokwane
15:00	Try: Tienie Janse van Rensburg 60'; Zacharias Johannes De Beer 65'; Con: Zander Byleveldt 60', 65' (2/2); Pen: Zander Byleveldt 6' (1/3); Cards: Wouter de Villiers (yellow card) 42' to 52'; Waldemar Kubannek (yellow card) 76'	Scoreboard	Try: Jermaine Anshon Apollis 3'; Justin St Jerry 23'; Leon Andries du Plessis 45'; Victor Joubert 48'; Willem Kok 50'; Jackie du Toit 70'; Alfred Ries 72'; Earl Lewis 75'; Con: Naas Olivier 3', 23', 45', 48', 50' (5/5); Willem Kok 56' (1/1); Chanley Williams (0/1); Pen: Naas Olivier (0/1)	Referee: T Correia

Bye/s: Raiders

===== Round Five =====
16 March 2013	Raiders	30 – 30	Rustenburg Impala	Bill Jardine Stadium, Johannesburg
16:00	Try: Gustav Gerhard de Vos 20'; Anvor Schooney 67'; Harold Rodney Primo 80'; Ashwill Adams 83'; Con: Arno Coetzee 20' (1/1); Anvor Schooney 67' (1/1); Pen: Arno Coetzee (0/2); Anvor Schooney (0/1)	Scoreboard	Try: Earl Lewis 9'; Jackie du Toit 55'; Alfred Ries 65'; Con: Naas Olivier 10', 55', 65' (3/3); Pen: Naas Olivier 4', 24', 40' (3/3)	Referee: Eugene de Wet

16 March 2013	Bloemfontein Crusaders	39 – 17	Noordelikes	Clive Solomon Stadium, Heidedal
16:00	Try: Brandon Colby 1'; Jason Horne 11'; Herchell Johnson 33'; Jonathan Boucher 58'; Vincent Maruping 79'; Con: Egan Duran Gysman 2', 12' (2/4); Griffon Duncan Colby 69' (1/1); Pen: Egan Duran Gysman (0/1); Griffon Duncan Colby (0/1); Drop: Griffon Duncan Colby 75' (1/1); Cards: Antonio Marcel van Heerden (yellow card) 52' to 62'; Andy Philander (yellow card) 78'	Scoreboard	Try: Tienie Janse van Rensburg 8'; Zander Byleveldt 53'; Everard Bye 71'; Con: Zander Byleveldt 72' (1/3)	Attendance: 2,000; Referee: Jaco Kotze

Bye/s: Roodepoort

=== Pool D ===
==== Log ====
2013 SARU Community Cup Pool D Log
Position	Team	Played	Won	Drawn	Lost	Points For	Points Against	Points Difference	Tries For	Tries Against	Try Bonus	Losing Bonus	Points
1	Brakpan	4	3	0	1	260	65	+195	39	9	3	1	16
2	Evergreens	4	3	0	1	117	76	+41	17	10	2	1	15
3	Old Selbornians	4	3	0	1	117	77	+40	16	11	1	1	14
4	Roses United	4	1	0	3	132	177	–45	18	26	2	1	7
5	White River	4	0	0	4	80	311	–231	13	47	2	0	2
The top 2 teams will qualify for the finals. Points breakdown: *4 points for a win *2 points for a draw *1 bonus point for a loss by seven points or less *1 bonus point for scoring four or more tries in a match

==== Fixtures and results ====
===== Round one =====
16 February 2013	Old Selbornians	8 – 15	Brakpan	Old Selbornian Rugby Club, East London
15:00	Try: Ludwe Booi 48'; Con: Matt Thompson (0/1); Pen: Glen Warner (0/2); Stuart Gilfillian Hudson (0/1); Drop: Glen Warner (0/1)	Scoreboard	Try: Shaun Botes 24'; Franco Booysen 35'; Con: Gido Horn 36' (1/2); Pen: Gido Horn (0/1); Charl Nieuwenhuis 75' (1/1); Cards: Roland Botes (yellow card) 44' to 54'	Attendance: 150; Referee: Loyiso Bosman

16 February 2013	Roses United	65 – 36	White River	Pelican Park, Wellington
15:00	Try: Jacquinn Hector Ruthford 1'; Hagen Mumba 10', 41'; Ryan Julies 25'; Ramon Cintin Samuels 43'; Denver Fortuin 60', 70'; Carlyle Lawrence 72'; Percival Godfrey Williams 81'; Con: Hagen Mumba 11', 26', 44', 61', 71', 73', 81' (7/9); Pen: Hagen Mumba 5', 79' (2/2)	Scoreboard	Try: Henk Emanuel van Tonder 7'; HJ Neethlingh 14', 76'; Conrad Botha 20'; Gerrit Stoltz 28', 65'; Con: Henk Emanuel van Tonder 21', 66' (2/5); HJ Neethlingh 76' (1/1)	Referee: Daniel Fortuin

Bye/s: Evergreens

===== Round two =====
23 February 2013	Brakpan	87 – 29	Roses United	Bosman Stadium, Brakpan
15:00	Try: Franco Booysen 1'; Shaun Botes 13'; Francois Alwyn Robbertse 22'; Gido Horn 25'; Charl Nieuwenhuis 33'; Jacques Nieuwenhuis 43'; Wikus van der Berg 58'; Vernon du Preez 75'; Con: Charl Nieuwenhuis 2', 23', 26', 28', 34', 36', 44', 59', 65', 66', 75' (11/13)	Scoreboard	Try: Kelvin Fikster 34'; Hagen Mumba 38'; Angelo Booyse 62'; Thurlow Marsh 80'; Con: Neil Papier 35' (1/1); Hagen Mumba 39' (1/1); Pen: Hagen Mumba (0/1); Cards: Lee-Heino Appollis (yellow card) 56'

23 February 2013	White River	20 – 48	Evergreens	White River Rugby Club, White River
15:00	Try: Neil Grobler 15'; Henk Emanuel van Tonder 47'; Neville Atkinson 75'; Con: Henk Emanuel van Tonder 47' (1/2); Driaan Barnard (0/1); Pen: Henk Emanuel van Tonder 26' (1/1); Cards: Johan Smit (yellow card) 52' to 62'	Scoreboard	Try: Joseph Fortuin 5', 19', 29'; Rudi Michaels 32'; Elmar Nigel February 36'; Alvin George Wildeman 51'; C-Than Justin Moos 61'; Christo Du Plessis 67'; Con: Elmar Nigel February 5' (1/2); C-Than Justin Moos (0/1); Pen: C-Than Justin Moos (0/1)

Bye/s: Old Selbornians

===== Round three =====
2 March 2013	Evergreens	28 – 24	Brakpan	Pacaltsdorp Sports Ground, Pacaltsdorp
16:00	Try: Joseph Fortuin 13'; Llewellyn Treurnicht 39'; Con: C-Than Justin Moos 14', 40' (2/3); Pen: C-Than Justin Moos 43', 54' (2/3); Drop: Leegan Moos 79' (1/1)	Scoreboard	Try: Wikus van der Berg 2'; Jason Arundel 20'; Vernon du Preez 28'; Con: Charl Nieuwenhuis 2', 29' (2/4)	Attendance: 2,500; Referee: François Groenewald

2 March 2013	Roses United	25 – 26	Old Selbornians	Pelican Park, Wellington
16:30	Try: Denver Fortuin 14'; Carlyle Lawrence 46'; Ryan Julies 78'; Con: Hagen Mumba 15' (1/2); Ryan Julies 78' (1/1); Pen: Hagen Mumba 6', 58' (2/3); Cards: Percival Godfrey Williams (yellow card) 33' to 43'; Denver Fortuin (yellow card) 52'	Scoreboard	Try: Curtis Kleinhans 11'; Craig Green 35'; Peter Seymore Smith 71'; Con: Stuart Gilfillian Hudson 36' (1/3); Pen: Stuart Gilfillian Hudson 8', 29', 60' (3/3); Cards: Michael-John le Marquand (yellow card) 65'; Paul Warner (yellow card) 65'	Attendance: 500; Referee: Matt Kemp

Bye/s: White River

===== Round four =====
9 March 2013	Old Selbornians	19 – 13	Evergreens	Old Selbornian Rugby Club, East London
15:00	Try: Glen Warner 49'; Duran Alberts 75'; Con: Stuart Gilfillian Hudson (0/2); Pen: Stuart Gilfillian Hudson 15', 21', 40' (3/6); Cards: Duran Alberts (yellow card) 60' to 73'	Scoreboard	Try: Joseph Fortuin 10'; Duwayne Smart 38'; Con: C-Than Justin Moos (0/1); Leegan Moos (0/1); Pen: C-Than Justin Moos (0/1); Leegan Moos 13' (1/1)	Attendance: 250; Referee: Lusanda Jam

9 March 2013	Brakpan	134 – 0	White River	Bosman Stadium, Brakpan
16:00	Try: Armand Steynvaart 1'; Jaco Lotter 5'; Franco Booysen 6'; Dirk van Wyk 15'; Wikus van der Berg 24'; Charl Nieuwenhuis 32'; Gido Horn 34'; Theodorus Mynhardt 48'; Dean van der Merwe 54'; Johan Veldtman 55' penalty try 68'; Tobie Strydom 70'; Roland Botes 71'; Con: Charl Nieuwenhuis 6', 7', 9', 13', 16', 22', 25', 34', 38', 44', 48', 54', 55', 68', 70', 79', 80' (17/20)	Scoreboard	Pen: Henk Emanuel van Tonder (0/1)	Attendance: 100; Referee: Eduan Nel

Bye/s: Roses United

===== Round Five =====
16 March 2013	White River	24 – 64	Old Selbornians	White River Rugby Club, White River
15:30	Try: Lodewyk van Staden 22'; Driaan Barnard 38'; Johan Smit 47'; Pieter Ekkerd 78'; Con: Henk Emanuel van Tonder 38', 47' (2/4)	Scoreboard	Try: Lindani Gulwa 9'; Curtis Kleinhans 12'; Duran Alberts 28'; Wade Bailey 40'; Neil James Wood 63'; Con: Glen Warner 9', 40', 42', 58', 63', 67', 72' (7/10)	Referee: Ricus van der Hoven

16 March 2013	Evergreens	28 – 13	Roses United	Pacaltsdorp Sports Ground, Pacaltsdorp
16:00	Try: Alrico Beukes 23'; Anvor Jason Prins 41'; Marvin November 67'; Gerschwin Muller 78'; Con: C-Than Justin Moos 23', 42', 67', 78' (4/4)	Scoreboard	Try: Gavoran Sherman 17'; Con: Hagen Mumba 18' (1/1); Pen: Hagen Mumba 49', 62' (2/3); Cards: Jacquinn Hector Ruthford (yellow card) 12' to 22'; Gerhardus Goosen (yellow card) 31'; Ramon Cintin Samuels (yellow card) 77'	Referee: Loyiso Bosman

Bye/s: Brakpan

== Finals ==
The finals will be played at Outeniqua Park, George from 28 March to 1 April 2013.

=== Quarter-finals ===
The winning teams qualify to the Cup Semi-Finals, while the losing teams qualify to the Bowl Semi-Finals.

28 March 2013	Brakpan	39 – 13	Roodepoort	Outeniqua Park, George
12:00	Try: Wikus van der Berg 24'; Tobie Strydom 33'; Armand Steynvaart 66'; Jaco Lotter 78'; Roland Botes 80'; Con: Charl Nieuwenhuis 34', 67', 79', 80' (4/5); Pen: Charl Nieuwenhuis 44', 77' (2/2); Cards: Shaun Botes (yellow card) 19' to 29'	Scoreboard	Try: Nicky Kritzinger 49'; Byron Godfrey 51'; Con: Steven Griffiths (0/2); Pen: Steven Griffiths 4' (1/2)

28 March 2013	Pretoria Police	25 – 33	Despatch	Outeniqua Park, George
14:00	Try: Hendrik van der Nest 13'; Pieter Johannes Strydom 52'; Sibongile Njomba 78'; Con: Dillon Laubscher 14', 78' (2/3); Pen: Dillon Laubscher 48', 59' (2/3); Cards: Louis van Biljon (yellow card) 79'	Scoreboard	Try: Ashley Viviers 3'; Billy Mintoor 28'; Dewald Barnard 56'; Bobby Dyer 63'; Con: Ryan Brown 4', 29' (2/3); Monty Dumond (0/1); Pen: Ryan Brown 75', 78' (2/4); Drop: Ryan Brown 70' (1/1); Cards: Trichardt van Tonder (yellow card) 59' to 69'; Bobby Dyer (yellow card) 79'

28 March 2013	College Rovers	27 – 17	Durbanville-Bellville	Outeniqua Park, George
16:00	Try: Chris Jordaan 9'; Sergio Lorenzo Torrens 46'; Con: Jors Dannhauser 9' (1/2); Pen: Jors Dannhauser 17', 33' (2/3); Christopher Ian Micklewood 39' (1/1); Drop: Christopher Ian Micklewood (0/1)	Scoreboard	Try: Gerrit Theron 5'; Marius White 36'; Con: Raynor Becker 6', 37' (2/2); Pen: Raynor Becker 30' (1/1)

28 March 2013	Evergreens	10 – 50	Rustenburg Impala	Outeniqua Park, George
18:00	Try: Gavin Delport 10'; Con: C-Than Justin Moos 11' (1/1); Pen: C-Than Justin Moos 34' (1/3); Drop: Leegan Moos (0/1); Cards: Gerschwin Muller (yellow card) 45'; Marvin November (yellow card) 72'	Scoreboard	Try: Leon Andries du Plessis 37'; Alfred Ries 51'; Jermaine Anshon Apollis 77'; Chanley Williams 79'; Marcell Esterhuyse 80'; Con: Naas Olivier 52', 78', 80', 81' (4/6); Pen: Naas Olivier 5', 14', 19', 73' (4/6)

=== Cup Semi-Finals ===
The winning teams qualify to the Cup Final, while the losing teams qualify to the Plate Final.

30 March 2013	Brakpan	25 – 29	College Rovers	Outeniqua Park, George
10:45	Try: Gido Horn 44'; Jaco Lotter 52'; Theodorus Mynhardt 57'; Con: Charl Nieuwenhuis 45', 53' (2/3); Pen: Charl Nieuwenhuis 3', 50' (2/2)	Scoreboard	Try: Kyle Claude Wilkinson 11'; Sergio Torrens 26'; Jors Dannhauser 67'; Con: Jors Dannhauser 12' (1/1); Greg Goosen 27' (1/1); Pen: Jors Dannhauser (0/1); Greg Goosen 36' (1/1)

30 March 2013	Rustenburg Impala	20 – 21	Despatch	Outeniqua Park, George
14:45	Try: Berty Visser 28', 54'; Con: Naas Olivier 29', 55' (2/2); Pen: Naas Olivier 40', 44' (2/2); Drop: Naas Olivier (0/1)	Scoreboard	Try: Monty Dumond 20'; Elroy Ligman 49'; Con: Ryan Brown 21' (1/1); Monty Dumond (0/1); Pen: Ryan Brown 24', 27' (2/5); Drop: Marlon Lewis 71' (1/2)

=== Bowl Semi-Finals ===
The winning teams qualify to the Bowl Final, while the losing teams qualify to the Shield Final.

30 March 2013	Roodepoort	10 – 23	Durbanville-Bellville	Outeniqua Park, George
8:45	Try: Johan Prins 26'; Con: Hendrik Gerhardus Oosthuizen 27' (1/1); Pen: Hendrik Gerhardus Oosthuizen 38' (1/3); Drop: Hendrik Gerhardus Oosthuizen (0/1); Cards: Jaun Shaw (yellow card) 66' to 76'	Scoreboard	Try: Edwin Sass 3', 68'; Liaan Scriven 71'; Morné Meningke 80'; Con: Raynor Becker (0/1); Tiaan Radyn (0/1); Liaan Scriven (0/1); Pen: Raynor Becker 31' (1/1)

30 March 2013	Evergreens	12 – 41	Pretoria Police	Outeniqua Park, George
12:45	Try: Gerschwin Muller 22', 77'; Con: Leegan Moos 23' (1/2)	Scoreboard	Try: Ruan van Loo 3'; Sibongile Njomba 19'; Michael Nienaber 25'; Jerry Sefoko 29'; Boris van Jaarsveld 33'; Con: Michael Pienaar 4' (1/4); Ruan van Loo (0/1); Cards: Stephan Steenkamp (yellow card) 73'

=== Cup Final ===
1 April 2013	College Rovers	24 – 26	Despatch	Outeniqua Park, George
14:30	Try: Chris Jordaan 14'; Sergio Torrens 40'; Con: Greg Goosen 15' (1/2); Pen: Christopher Ian Micklewood 4' (1/1); Greg Goosen 22' (1/1)	Scoreboard	Try: Marlon Lewis 8'; Trichardt van Tonder 11'; Jaco Swanepoel 17'; Con: Ryan Brown (0/2); Monty Dumond 18' (1/1); Pen: Monty Dumond 27', 49', 80' (3/4); Drop: Marlon Lewis (0/1); Monty Dumond (0/1); Cards: Ashley Viviers (yellow card) 74'

=== Plate Final ===
1 April 2013	Brakpan	58 – 8	Rustenburg Impala	Outeniqua Park, George
12:30	Try: Ulrich Vinoh van Schalkwyk 6'; Jacques Nieuwenhuis 9'; Wihan Dippenaar 40'; Roan Helberg 49'; Johan Veldtman 56'; Franco Booysen 74'; Con: Charl Nieuwenhuis 7', 10', 40', 50', 57', 67', 75' (7/7); Pen: Charl Nieuwenhuis 3', 19', 47' (3/3); Cards: Christo Joubert (yellow card) 44' to 54'	Scoreboard	Try: Nathan Neal Fourie 17'; Con: Naas Olivier (0/1); Pen: Chanley Williams 45' (1/1)

=== Bowl Final ===
1 April 2013	Durbanville-Bellville	30 – 3	Pretoria Police	Outeniqua Park, George
10:30	Try: Tiaan Radyn 19'; Morné Meningke 32'; Carel du Preez 36'; Renier Johannes Marais 42'; Jody Reyneke 80'; Con: Tiaan Radyn 43' (1/4); Raymond Olivier (0/1); Pen: Tiaan Radyn (0/1); Liaan Scriven (0/1); Drop: Liaan Scriven (0/1); Tiaan Radyn (0/1); Johannes Izak Adolf Saayman 45' (1/1)	Scoreboard	Pen: Ruan van Loo 25' (1/2); Cards: Warick Curry (yellow card) 75'

=== Shield Final ===
1 April 2013	Evergreens	24 – 47	Roodepoort	Outeniqua Park, George
8:30	Try: Leegan Moos 32'; Christiaan Kruger 49'; Con: C-Than Justin Moos 33', 50', 52' (3/3); Pen: C-Than Justin Moos 38' (1/2)	Scoreboard	Try: Jaco Vermeulen 3'; Jaun Shaw 16'; Cliffie Vermaak 65'; Hendrik Gerhardus Oosthuizen 70'; Nicky Cronjé 75'; Con: Steven Griffiths 4', 57', 71' (3/7); Pen: Steven Griffiths 11', 14' (2/3)

== Honours ==
2013 SARU Community Cup Champions:	Despatch
