= Liege Hulett =

South African businessman (1838–1928)

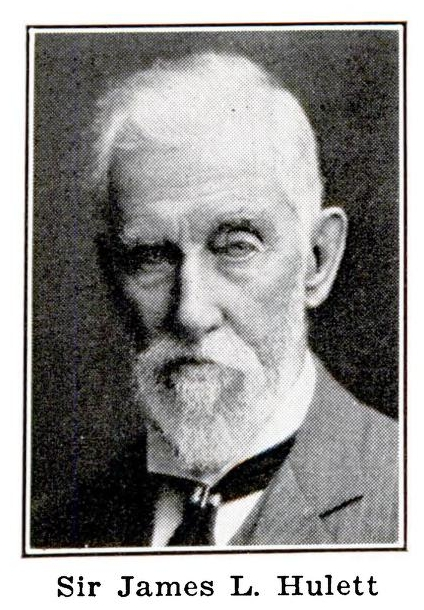

Sir James Liege Hulett (17 May 1838 – 5 June 1928) was a British sugar magnate, politician and philanthropist in Colony of Natal, South Africa. Hulett founded what would become Tongaat Hulett Sugar in 1892. The JSE Securities Exchange-listed company is today a multi-billion rand corporation.

== Career ==
James Liege Hulett was originally from Kent, and arrived in Durban at the end of May 1857, aboard the Lady Shelbourne with an offer of a position with a chemist, William Henry Burgess, a friend of his father. He was lent £25 by his uncle, George Flashman. In 1860 he advertised for a farm in the Nonoti area and successfully leased an area of 600 acres, which he called Kearsney. He experimented with maize, sweet potatoes, chillies, arrowroot and coffee and also established a trading store. Soon Liege Hulett commanded a flourishing business, which enabled him to purchase several farms in the area. It was at Kearsney that he established a thriving tea estate, which was the foundation of the company Sir J.L. Hulett & Sons. This was also the start of his sugar empire.

Hulett Street was named after him.

Liege Hulett took the name of his estate from an old village and medieval manor not far from Dover in Kent. The name Kearsney derives from the French Cressoniere meaning a place where watercress is grown. The double-storied Kearsney house with a small turret projecting above the roof level was erected on the highest point of the estate and built on the farm. He created at Kearsney a place of peace and harmony which inspired others to improve and beautify their own estates.

Kearsney House was a well made and designed mansion with large, furnished reception rooms and 22 bedrooms. When tea production ceased on Kearsney, the ornamental trees protecting the tea gardens were replaced with sugar cane. Sir Liege imported many varieties of seeds and plants of a wide range of fruits – guavas, cloves, mangoes, apples etc., citrus of all kinds and planted orchards near Kearsney House. He has been criticised for growing his sugar empire using the indentured labour of Indian migrants. He was also dependent on "cheap black labour" and protested against the proposed native labour contingent to be sent to France during the First World War, arguing that Natal could not "spare any native labour". Governor General Sydney Buxton remarked that the capitalist class in Natal "want the labour and they are afraid that if they allow the Zulu to go and assist the Empire, they will suffer in their pockets. The Natal Britisher is a great man to talk of Natal as British to the backbone, but when it comes to helping the Empire in the concrete he pauses if his own interests are involved or affected."

During the period 1868 to 1887 the eight children of Liege Hulett and Mary Balcomb were all born at Kearsney. The boys became expert craftsmen and helped to build the Kearsney homestead, while the girls helped in the house with sewing and other domestic chores. During the Bambatha Rebellion, settlers in Natal lived under difficult and often dangerous conditions; neighbours were few and far between. Kearsney was only nine miles from the Zulu border and, in 1879 when war broke out, there was considerable alarm at Kearsney. On one occasion, an alarm was given that the Zulus had crossed the river. All the neighbours, their children and their servants flocked into the laager, which remained in a state of siege, but was never attacked.

Sir Leige Hulett was a cabinet minister in a number of Natal Governments and was the Speaker of the Legislative Assembly in 1902 when he led the Natal delegation to the coronation of King Edward VII. He was knighted for his services to the Colony in the 1902 Coronation Honours list. He resigned from the post of Speaker in November 1902, in order to become leader of the opposition in the Natal Legislature.

Sir Liege then moved to Durban and Kearsney House remained vacant until 1921.

Another legacy of Sir Liege's is his founding of Kearsney College in 1921, a now world-famous private school for boys. Sir Liege cherished the idea of establishing a boys' school for Methodist ministers and their sons and those of the families of the free churches. He considered Kearsney House to be ideally suited for this purpose. On 29 November 1920 a contract was signed with the Wesleyan Church for the use of Kearsney House as a school. This was the birth of Kearsney College and remains a living memorial to Sir Liege. The school opened with 11 boys. Kearsney College remained at the Kearsney Estate until June 1939 when it moved to its present site at Botha's Hill between Pietermaritzburg and Durban. The decision to move the school was based on the reluctance of parents to send their sons to a school on the north coast that suffered many cases of malaria in the 1930s, although none were reported at Kearsney.

The house then became known as St. Luke's Home of Healing, which was home to mentally and physically challenged patients. In November 2004, Kearsney House was bought by Paul and Erica Kalil of Kloof, who have made it their ongoing challenge to renovate and restore the home to its former glory.
