= Masixole Banda =

South African rugby union player

- Born: 11 June 1988 (age 38) Port Elizabeth, South Africa
- Height: 1.65 m (5 ft 5 in)
- Weight: 69 kg (152 lb; 10 st 12 lb)
- School: Ithembelihle High School, New Brighton
- University: University of Fort Hare

Rugby union career
- Position(s): Fullback; Fly-Half
- Current team: Eastern Province Elephants
Youth career
- 2009: Eastern Province U19
- 2010–2011: Eastern Province U21
Amateur team(s)
Years	Team	Apps	(Points)
2012	UFH Blues	6	(59)
2013	African Bombers	4	(0)
Senior career
Years	Team	Apps	(Points)
2014	Eastern Province Kings	5	(21)
2014–2016	Border Bulldogs	46	(343)
2017–2020	Southern Kings	53	(170)
2020–2022	Griquas	7	(5)
2022–	Eastern Province Elephants	8	(67)
- Correct as of 10 July 2022

Masixole 'Coyi' Banda (born 11 June 1988) is a South African rugby union player for the Southern Kings in the Pro14. He can play as a fly-half, winger or fullback.

== Career ==
=== Youth and amateur rugby ===
Banda played his school rugby at Ithembelihle High School, New Brighton until 2010 under the tutelage of Theo Pieterse, who guided the school to being named the School Team of the Year in 2012.

Banda was also named in the Eastern Province U19 squad for the 2009 Under-19 Provincial Championship competition and played for them at Under-21 level during the 2010 and 2011 Under-21 Provincial Championship seasons, making six starts. He was also included in an Eastern Province Kings side that played against the South Africa Under-20 side in 2011, scoring eleven points in a 31–16 defeat.

Banda then joined club side African Bombers. In 2012, Banda started six matches for the UFH Blues in the 2012 Varsity Shield competition – being named the Player that Rocks in their match against UWC – and in 2013, he played for the Bombers in the 2013 SARU Community Cup competition, starting in four of their matches in the competition.

=== Eastern Province Kings ===
In 2014, the Eastern Province Kings announced that several club players would join their wider training squad for the 2014 Vodacom Cup. Banda was included in the training squad and was subsequently included in their squad for the tournament.

Banda made his first class debut against the Border Bulldogs in Grahamstown and scored two first-half tries on debut to help the Kings to a 60–6 against their Eastern Cape rivals.

After making five appearances in the Vodacom Cup competition, however, he was dropped for disciplinary reasons after he played in matches for club side African Bombers and not showing up for training sessions.
