= Wandile Mjekevu =

South African rugby union player

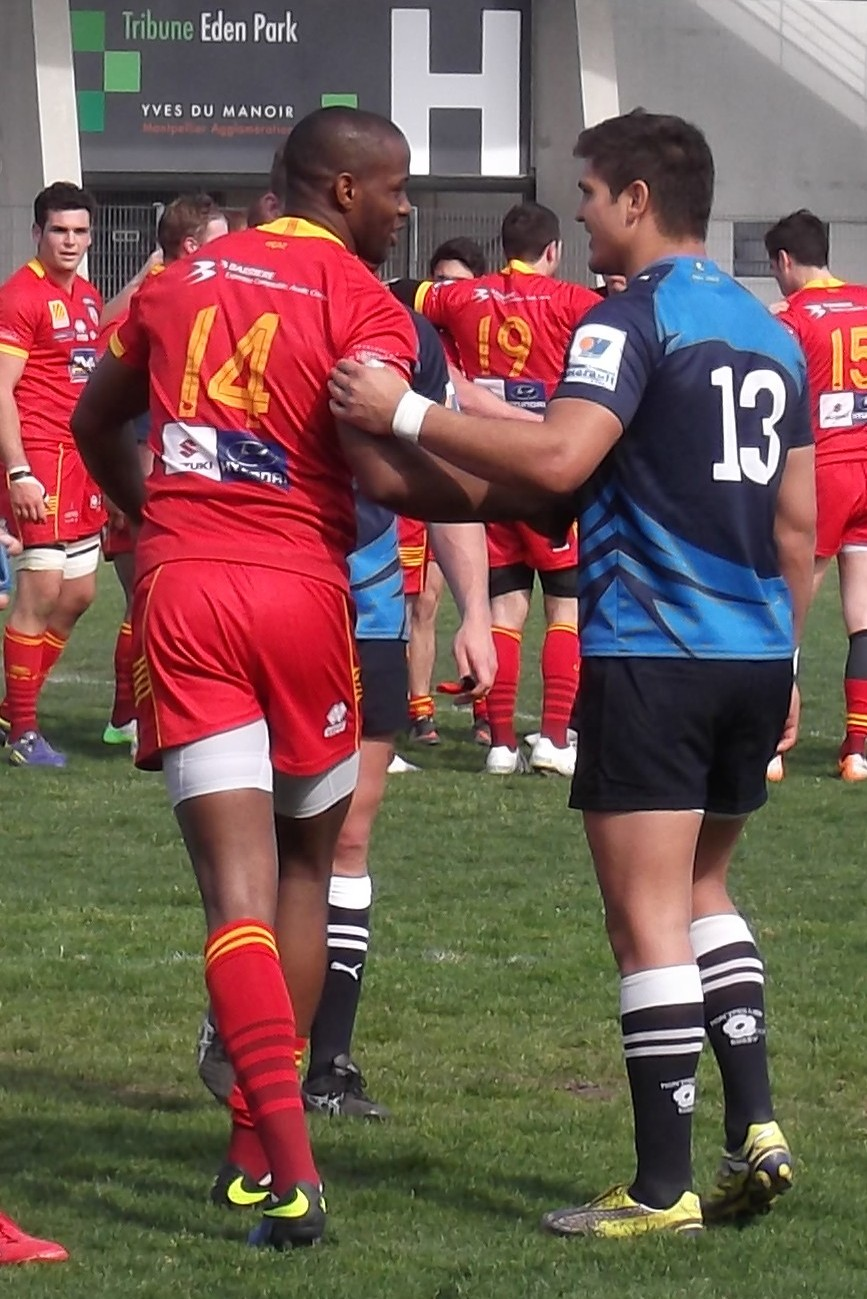
- Full name: Wandile Gabada Mjekevu
- Born: 7 January 1991 (age 35) Durban, South Africa
- Height: 1.90 m (6 ft 3 in)
- Weight: 94 kg (207 lb; 14 st 11 lb)
- School: King Edward VII School, Johannesburg

Rugby union career
- Position: Wing / Centre
- Current team: Stade Olympique Chambérien Rugby
Youth career
- 2007–2011: Golden Lions
Amateur team(s)
Years	Team	Apps	(Points)
2013	College Rovers	5	(25)
Senior career
Years	Team	Apps	(Points)
2010–2011	Lions	10	(20)
2010–2011	Golden Lions XV	4	(5)
2012–2013	Sharks XV	6	(5)
2013–2015	Perpignan	36	(80)
2015–2016	Sharks (Currie Cup)	13	(15)
2016–2017	Southern Kings	11	(30)
2016–2017	Sharks XV	3	(20)
2017	Eastern Province Kings	3	(5)
2017–2018	Toulouse	14	(20)
2018–2019	Perpignan	5	(0)
2021	Sporting Club Albigeois	7	(10)
2021–2022	Stade Olympique Chambérien Rugby	15	(0)
2022-	Sporting Club Albigeois		
- Correct as of 23 June 2022
International career
Years	Team	Apps	(Points)
2008	South Africa Under-18 Elite Squad		
2008	South Africa Schools		
2009	South Africa Schools High Performance squad		
2010–2011	South Africa Under-20	10	(35)
- Correct as of 9 September 2021

Wandile Gabada Mjekevu (born 7 January 1991) is a South African rugby union player who plays as a center or a wing for Sporting Club Albigeois in the French Top 14 competition.

== Career ==
=== Club ===
==== Golden Lions ====
He started his career with the Johannesburg-based Golden Lions. He represented them at Under-16 level in 2007 and at the 2008 Craven Week tournament. After playing for the Golden Lions U19 side in 2008 and 2009, he made his first class debut for the Lions in their 2010 Super 14 match against the Stormers. In his second match, he scored a hat-trick in the Lions' 65–72 defeat to New Zealand's Chiefs. He eventually made a total of ten appearances during the tournament. He played for the Golden Lions U21s in the 2010 Under-21 Provincial Championship Group A, making three appearances. He was named on the bench for the Golden Lions' 2010 Currie Cup Premier Division match against the Pumas, but failed to make an appearance.

The following season, he made four appearances for the Golden Lions in the 2011 Vodacom Cup and eleven appearances for the Golden Lions in the 2011 Under-21 Provincial Championship.

==== Sharks ====
In 2012, Mjekevu returned to his hometown of Durban to join the Sharks. He made six appearances for them during the 2012 Vodacom Cup, scoring one try in their match against a Free State XV. He played in 13 matches for the Sharks XV during the 2012 Under-21 Provincial Championship.

However, he failed to break into their Currie Cup squad and the following season, he played in the 2013 SARU Community Cup for Durban-based club side College Rovers. He scored a brace of tries in their match against SK Walmers and a hat-trick the following week against Villagers Worcester as College Rovers finished runners-up in the inaugural competition.

==== Perpignan ====
In 2013, Mjekevu signed a deal to join French Top 14 side Perpignan in 2013. He scored four tries in 15 appearances for them in the 2013–14 Top 14 season, which wasn't enough to prevent his side finishing 13th and being relegated to the Rugby Pro D2. He also scored two tries in three appearances in the 2013–14 Heineken Cup.

He scored ten tries in 18 appearances in the 2014–15 Rugby Pro D2 as Perpignan finished in third place on the log, before losing to Agen on number of tries scored in the promotion play-offs.

==== Return to Sharks ====
After the 2014–2015 European season, Mjekevu returned to the Sharks prior to the 2015 Currie Cup Premier Division, signing a two-year deal with the team.

==== Kings ====
Mjekevu was named in the Sharks squad for the 2016 Super Rugby season, but failed to make any appearances in the first thirteen rounds of the competition and was loaned out to the Port Elizabeth-based Southern Kings for the remainder of the season.

==== Return to Europe: Top 14 and Nationale ====
Since leaving the Southern Kings in 2017, Mjekevu has played for a variety of French sides. He spent a season each at Toulouse and his former club Perpignan in the Top 14 but after limited game time at Perpignan and not playing for a period, he moved to the Sporting Club Albigeois in the Nationale for the 2020/2021 season. After a handful of appearances, he moved to Stade Olympique Chambérien Rugby for the 2021/2022 season, playing for them on 15 occasions. On 21 June 2022, Sporting Club Albigeois announced that Mjekevu was returning to them for the 2022/2023 season

=== Representative rugby ===
Mjekevu earned a number of call-ups to junior South African sides. He was selected in a South African Under-18 Elite Squad in 2008 and subsequently selected in the final South African Schools squad in the same year. In 2009, he was included in a South African Under-18 High Performance Squad and he was a member of the South Africa Under-20 team that played in the 2010 and 2011 IRB Junior World Championships.
