= Tongaat Hulett =

Agriculture company

Tongaat Hulett Ltd.
- Type: Public
- Traded as: JSE: TON, LSE: THL
- Industry: Agriculture; Sugar
- Founded: 1892; 134 years ago
- Headquarters: oThongathi, KwaZulu-Natal, South Africa
- Key people: Liege Hulett, founder JG Hudson, CEO
- Revenue: ▲R14,373 Billion (FY 2013)
- Net income: ▲R2,145 Billion (FY 2013)
- Number of employees: 31, 230
- Website: www.tongaat.com www.huletts.co.za

Tongaat Hulett is a South African agriculture and agri-processing business, focusing on the complementary feedstocks of sugarcane and maize. Headquartered in oThongathi, KwaZulu-Natal, Tongaat Hulett was founded in 1892.

The company was formed as a result of a merger between the Tongaat Sugar Company and Hulett's Sugar. Company stock is listed on the Johannesburg Securities Exchange. Its core businesses are sugar, starch and property management.

The company is the largest producer of white refined sugar in South Africa. It operates three sugar mills in SA, with a capacity of over 4.8 million tons per year. Sugar cane is provided to Tongaat Hulett by around 18,000 independent growers.

== History ==
In 2022, Tongaat Hulett entered business rescue - a process which later failed.

In June 2026, it was reported that a liquidation hearing for the company was upcoming. The South African Canegrowers Association said that if the company was allowed to enter an unfunded liquidation, commercial demand for white sugar would shift overseas. It asked the Department of Trade, Industry and Competition (DTIC) and others to take measures to prevent the liquidation, or ensure a funded liquidation.

== Corruption and looting ==
At the end of 2018, the CEO, Peter Staude took early retirement and the chief financial officer, Murray Munro, went on sick-leave. In January 2019, a new CEO was appointed. In February 2019, the company announced a drop in expected profits as well as a liquidity crisis.

In May 2019, the company announced that its published financial results could not be relied on and that the company's equity (the value of the business after liabilities) in its 2018, financial results has been overstated by between R3.5 billion to R4.5 billion in addition revised financial reports would be published in October 2019. The Zimbabwean operation of Tongaat-Hulett has also not been able to provide reliable financial reports in 2019 on time.

PricewaterhouseCoopers was employed to do a forensic audit. The diligence of the company's regular auditors, Deloitte has been called into question. The company suspended trading on the Johannesburg Stock Exchange. In late June 2019, the company laid a criminal charge against an unnamed executive. In an effort to survive the company is cutting costs and has sent retrenchment letters to 5000 employees. In August 2019, the company decided to remove itself from the list of traded companies on the London Stock Exchange.

In February 2022, seven people connected with the scandal namely, Peter Staude, Murray Hector Munro, Michael Edward Deighton, Rory Edward Wilkinson, Kamasagrie Singh, Samantha Shukla and Gavin Dykes Kruger appeared in the Durban Specialised Commercial Crimes Court and were granted bail. The appeared in court again in April 2022.
