= Greg Goosen =

- Full name: Gregory John Goosen
- Born: 9 September 1983 (age 42) Durban, South Africa
- Height: 6 ft 1 in (185 cm)
- Weight: 194 lb (88 kg)
- School: Kearsney College

Rugby union career
- Position: Fullback / Centre / Fly-half
Senior career
| Years | Team | Apps | (Points) |
| 2006–10 | Racing 92 | | |
| 2010–11 | Stade Rochelais | | |
| 2011–12 | Newcastle Falcons | | |
| 2012–13 | SU Agen | | |

Gregory John Goosen (born 9 September 1983) is a South African former professional rugby union player.

Born in Durban, Goosen was a versatile utility back, used mostly as a fullback, but also capable of playing as a centre or fly-half. He toured the United Kingdom with the Natal Sharks under-19s, but found himself behind the likes of Percy Montgomery and Brent Russell for senior selection, so made the decision to continue his career in France.

Goosen had four seasons at Paris-based club Racing 92, then crossed to Stade Rochelais for a season in 2010–11. He was signed in 2011 by Premiership Rugby side Newcastle Falcons to play fullback and impressed with a hattrick in their LV Cup win over Cardiff. In 2012, Goosen was loaned out to French club SU Agen, a stint which ended early when he was knocked out and concussed against Castres. He subsequently retired and returned to South Africa.
