= Robert Polkinghorne =

Australian rules footballer

Personal information
- Full name: Robert Keith Polkinghorne
- Born: 27 February 1958 (age 68)
- Height: 183 cm (6 ft 0 in)
- Weight: 86 kg (190 lb)

Playing career^{1}
Years	Club	Games (Goals)
1979–80	Hawthorn	5 (0)
- ^{1} Playing statistics correct to the end of 1980.

Robert Keith Polkinghorne (born 27 February 1958) is a former Australian rules footballer who played with Hawthorn in the Victorian Football League (VFL).

His older brother David Polkinghorne (footballer), played 164 games for Hawthorn between 1976 and 1984.
