= David Polkinghorne (footballer) =

Australian rules footballer

Personal information
- Full name: David Hugh Polkinghorne
- Born: 1 February 1956 (age 70)
- Original team: Scotch College
- Height: 182 cm (6 ft 0 in)
- Weight: 84 kg (185 lb)

Playing career^{1}
Years	Club	Games (Goals)
1975–1984	Hawthorn	164 (10)
- ^{1} Playing statistics correct to the end of 1984.

David Hugh Polkinghorne (born 1 February 1956) is a former Australian rules footballer who played with Hawthorn in the VFL.

Polkinghorne was a defender who played on the half back flanks and back pockets for Hawthorn. Renowned for his awkward kicking style, he played in Hawthorn premiership teams in 1976 and 1978.

In the 1982 Qualifying Final against Carlton he was struck in the face by Wayne Johnston and then gave evidence against him at the tribunal, thus breaking a code of silence. Johnston was found guilty and suspended.

== Family ==
His younger brother Robert Polkinghorne, played 5 games for Hawthorn between 1979 and 1980.
