= David Polkinghorne (cricketer) =

South African cricketer (born 1964)

Personal information
- Full name: David Andrew Polkinghorne
- Born: 20 April 1964 (age 62); Durban, Natal, South Africa
- Batting: Right-handed
- Bowling: Right-arm off break

Domestic team information
- Years: Team
- 1988: Oxford University

Career statistics
Competition	First-class
Matches	3
Runs scored	72
Batting average	24.00
100s/50s	–/–
Top score	45*
Catches/stumpings	2/–
- Source: Cricinfo, 4 April 2020

David Andrew Polkinghorne (born 20 April 1964) is a South African former first-class cricketer.

Polkinghorne studied in England as a Rhodes Scholar at Pembroke College, Oxford. While studying at Oxford, he made three appearances in first-class cricket for Oxford University in 1988, playing against Hampshire, Kent and Nottinghamshire.
