= 2015 Eastern Province Kings season =

Team Information
- Stadium: Nelson Mandela Bay Stadium
- President: Cheeky Watson

Currie Cup
- Coach: Brent Janse van Rensburg
- Captain: Luke Watson / Steven Sykes / Tim Whitehead
- Rank: 7th
- Record: Won 2, Lost 6
- Top points scorer: Scott van Breda (68)
- Top try scorer: Paul Schoeman (4)

Vodacom Cup (South)
- Coach: Mzwandile Stick
- Captain: Shane Gates / Edgar Marutlulle / Tim Whitehead
- Rank: 5th
- Record: Won 3, Lost 4
- Top points scorer: Scott van Breda (29)
- Top try scorers: Paul Schoeman (4)

Other seasons
- Previous season: ← 2014
- Next season: 2016 →

In 2015, the Eastern Province Kings will participate in the Currie Cup and the Vodacom Cup competitions. The Eastern Province U21 team will also play in the 2015 Under-21 Provincial Championship Group A and the Eastern Province U19 team in the 2015 Under-19 Provincial Championship Group A. As part of the Southern Kings franchise, a number of players will also participate in friendlies for this franchise.

== Chronological list of events ==
- 5 November 2014: The squad for the 2015 season is revealed. New recruits include Nathan Daly from English Premiership, Tazz Fuzani and Jan Uys from Western Province.
- 14 November 2014: Winger Paul Perez's contract is terminated with immediate effect after an incident of absenteeism.
- 17 November 2014: Blue Bulls fly-half Tony Jantjies joins the Kings ahead of the 2015 season, defensive coach Michael Horak joins Durban-based side the Sharks prior to the 2015 Super Rugby season. and the Sharks confirm that Paul Perez joined them on a trial basis.
- 29 December 2014: Forwards coach Shaun Sowerby also leaves the Kings' coaching staff, returning to France (where he spent ten years as a player) to join Montpellier as a forwards coach.
- 14 January 2015: Three players join the Kings on a trial basis – scrum-half Dylon Frylinck, who represented Western Province in the 2014 Vodacom Cup, the Stormers in the 2014 Super Rugby season and the Pumas in the 2014 Currie Cup Premier Division; lock Cornell Hess, who spent 2014 at Griquas, but failed to make any appearances following a knee injury and hooker Martin van der Heever, who previously played for Toulouse in France.
- 15 January 2015: The Kings officially confirm that Omar Mouneimne rejoined the side as defensive coach. He had a previous spell with the side before following Alan Solomons to Edinburgh in 2013. James Fleming, who previously had a spell at the Kings as a physiotherapist before joining the Sharks for 2014, also returns to the Kings in his new role of Head of High Performance.
- 19 January 2015: The Eastern Province Kings Academy hand a scholarship to Craven Week and South African Schools prop Lupumlo Mguca to finish his schooling at Burnside High School in Christchurch, New Zealand.
- 30 January 2015: A 38-man squad for the 2015 Vodacom Cup is revealed. The Kings also confirm that Dylon Frylinck and Cornell Hess were offered contracts for the duration of the Vodacom Cup competition.
- 2 February 2015: Leopards wingers Sylvian Mahuza and Luther Obi are training with the EP Kings.
- 8 February 2015: Eastern Province and South African Schools fly-half Curwin Bosch is named the 2014 Craven Week Player of the Tournament at the annual South African Rugby Union awards ceremony.
- 12 February 2015: Lock Steven Sykes joins the Cheetahs on loan for the 2015 Super Rugby season.
- 25 February 2015: Just over a month after confirming his appointment, the EP Kings announce that defensive coach Omar Mouneimne is leaving them again to take up a consultancy role at French Top 14 side Lyon.
- 27 February 2015: The EP Kings announce that they have come to an arrangement with the Leopards for the services of their wingers Sylvian Mahuza and Luther Obi, who will be included in their squad for the 2015 Vodacom Cup.
- 2 March 2015: Brent Janse van Rensburg is appointed the new Head of Defence at the Kings following his release from the Golden Lions.
- 6 March 2015: The Free State Cheetahs beat the Eastern Province Kings 31–30 in a pre-season trial match in Port Elizabeth. The Kings scored four tries through Hansie Graaff, George Whitehead, Kevin Luiters and Dylon Frylinck, with Scott van Breda and Tony Jantjies each converting one of those tries. George Whitehead also kicked two penalties in the match.
- 14 March 2015: The Eastern Province Kings beat the Golden Lions 13–8 in a pre-season trial match. Eital Bredenkamp scored the Kings' only try of the match, with Gary van Aswegen converting the try and kicking two penalties.
- 25 March 2015: Three Eastern Province Kings players are named in an extended South Africa Under-20 training group as part of their preparation for the 2015 World Rugby Under 20 Championship – fullback Malcolm Jaer and flankers Tyler Paul and CJ Velleman.
- 27 March 2015: Prop Charl du Plessis announces his retirement from rugby following medical advice regarding persistent back problems. He made 31 appearances for the Eastern Province Kings since 2012 and also played in 2 Super Rugby matches for the Southern Kings, plus one leg of the relegation play-off series against the Lions.
- 9 June 2015: Defense coach Brent Janse van Rensburg is appointed the new head coach of the Eastern Province Kings for the 2015 Currie Cup Premier Division.
- 24 June 2015: Fly-half Tony Jantjies' contract is terminated with immediate effect following a breach of team protocol.
- 21 July 2015: Former head coach and the current kicking and specialist skills coach, Carlos Spencer, leaves the EP Kings after being involved with the side since December 2013.
- 24 July 2015: Grey High School players Curwin Bosch (fly-half) and Khwezi Mafu (loose forward) are both named in the 2015 South African Schools squad to play internationals against Wales, France and England, while Grey lock Kamva Dilima is named in the South African Schools 'A' squad to play against Italy, England and Wales, alongside Hoërskool Framesby players André Lategan (hooker) and Riaan van Rensburg (fullback) and HTS Daniel Pienaar centre Heino Bezuidenhout.
- 17 August 2015: The Kings announced a three-year apparel sponsorship deal with BLK, starting in 2016. The deal would see BLK supply the kit for the Eastern Province Kings Currie Cup side, as well as the Southern Kings Super Rugby side.

== Players ==
=== Player list ===
The following players were named in a pre-season training squad:

Props: (South Africa) Tom Botha; (South Africa) Charl du Plessis; (South Africa) Lizo Gqoboka; (South Africa) Simon Kerrod; (South Africa) Charles Marais; (South Africa) Enoch Mnyaka; (South Africa) Brenden Olivier; (South Africa) Vukile Sofisa; (South Africa) CJ van der Linde; Hookers: (South Africa) Albé de Swardt; (South Africa) Martin Ferreira; (South Africa) Edgar Marutlulle; (South Africa) Michael van Vuuren; Locks: (South Africa) David Bulbring; (South Africa) Armand du Preez; (South Africa) Tazz Fuzani; (South Africa) Cameron Lindsay; (South Africa) Shaun McDonald; (South Africa) Darron Nell; (South Africa) Kuhle Sonkosi; (South Africa) Steven Sykes; (South Africa) Jan Uys	Loose forwards: (Uganda) Tim Agaba; (South Africa) Thembelani Bholi; (South Africa) Eital Bredenkamp; (South Africa) Aidon Davis; (South Africa) Paul Schoeman; (South Africa) Claude Tshidibi; (South Africa) Luke Watson (c); (South Africa) Stefan Willemse; (South Africa) Stephan Zaayman; Scrum-halves: (South Africa) Enrico Acker; (South Africa) Jaco Grobler; (South Africa) Kevin Luiters; Fly-halves: (South Africa) Tony Jantjies; (South Africa) Gary van Aswegen; (South Africa) George Whitehead	Centres: (South Africa) Michael Bernardt; (South Africa) Ronnie Cooke; (South Africa) Shane Gates; (South Africa) Dwayne Jenner; (South Africa) Andile Jho; (South Africa) Marlou van Niekerk; (South Africa) Tim Whitehead; Wingers: (South Africa) Eben Barnard; (South Africa) Siyanda Grey; (South Africa) Sphu Msutwana; Fullbacks: (South Africa) Hansie Graaff; (South Africa) Siviwe Soyizwapi; (South Africa) Scott van Breda

=== Vodacom Cup squad ===
The following players were included in their 2015 Vodacom Cup squad:

Props: (South Africa) Tom Botha; (South Africa) Charl du Plessis; (South Africa) Lizo Gqoboka; (South Africa) Simon Kerrod; (South Africa) Charles Marais; (South Africa) Enoch Mnyaka; (South Africa) Vukile Sofisa; (South Africa) CJ van der Linde; Hookers: (South Africa) Albé de Swardt; (South Africa) Martin Ferreira; (South Africa) Edgar Marutlulle; (South Africa) Michael van Vuuren; Locks: (South Africa) David Bulbring; (South Africa) Tazz Fuzani; (South Africa) Cornell Hess; (South Africa) Cameron Lindsay; (South Africa) Shaun McDonald; (South Africa) Jan Uys	Loose forwards: (Uganda) Tim Agaba; (South Africa) Thembelani Bholi; (South Africa) Eital Bredenkamp; (South Africa) Aidon Davis; (South Africa) Paul Schoeman; (South Africa) CJ Velleman; (South Africa) Luke Watson (c); (South Africa) Stefan Willemse; Scrum-halves: (South Africa) Enrico Acker; (South Africa) Dylon Frylinck; (South Africa) Jaco Grobler; (South Africa) Kevin Luiters; Fly-halves: (South Africa) Tony Jantjies; (South Africa) Gary van Aswegen; (South Africa) George Whitehead	Centres: (South Africa) Ronnie Cooke; (South Africa) Shane Gates; (South Africa) Andile Jho; (South Africa) Marlou van Niekerk; (South Africa) Tim Whitehead; Wingers: (South Africa) Siyanda Grey; (South Africa) Sylvian Mahuza; (South Africa) Sphu Msutwana; (South Africa) Luther Obi; Fullbacks: (South Africa) Hansie Graaff; (South Africa) Malcolm Jaer; (South Africa) Siviwe Soyizwapi; (South Africa) Scott van Breda

=== Player movements ===
==== In ====
Position	Player Name	From	Reference
LK	Tazz Fuzani	Western Province	
LK	Cornell Hess	Griquas	
LK	Jan Uys	Western Province	
FL	Eital Bredenkamp	Western Province	
SH	Dylon Frylinck	Pumas	
FH	Tony Jantjies	Pumas	
WG	Sylvian Mahuza	Leopards	
WG	Luther Obi	Leopards	

==== Out ====
Position	Player Name	To	Reference
Players that played in the 2014 Currie Cup
PR	Charl du Plessis	Retired	
PR	BG Uys	Free State Cheetahs	
LK	Steve Cummins	(Australia) Rebels	
LK	Darron Nell	Not named (injured)	
LK	Steven Sykes	Cheetahs (loan)	
FL	Devin Oosthuizen	Free State Cheetahs	
SH	Tobie Botes	Released	
FH	Ntabeni Dukisa	Griquas	
CE	Dwayne Jenner	Not named (injured)	
Players that played in the 2014 Vodacom Cup
PR	Brenden Olivier	NMMU Madibaz	
PR	Pieter Stemmet	Pumas	
HK	Tabbie du Plessis	Released	
HK	Dane van der Westhuyzen	NMMU Madibaz	
LK	Rynier Bernardo	(Wales) Ospreys	
LK	Louis Fourie	Released	
LK	Brendan Hector	Released	
LK	Tyler Paul	NMMU Madibaz	
LK	Kuhle Sonkosi	Released	
FL	Ivan-John du Preez	NMMU Madibaz	
FL	Siphesihle Punguzwa	UFH Blues	
FL	Claude Tshidibi	Released	
FL	Stephan Zaayman	NMMU Madibaz	
SH	Dwayne Kelly	SWD Eagles	
SH	Kalvano King	Despatch	
SH	Sonwabo Majola	Eastern Province U21	
SH	Kayle van Zyl	(Italy) Mogliano	
FH	Morné Hugo	Boland Cavaliers	
CE	Michael Bernardt	NMMU Madibaz	
CE	Selvyn Davids	Despatch	
CE	Tiger Mangweni	Retired	
CE	Luan Nieuwoudt	NMMU Madibaz	
WG	Eben Barnard	NMMU Madibaz	
WG	Ofentse Boloko	Released	
WG	Michael Killian	Retired	
WG	Lance Louw	Released	
WG	Sergeal Petersen	Free State Cheetahs	
WG	Brian Skosana	SWD Eagles	
FB	Masixole Banda	Border Bulldogs	
FB	Malcolm Jaer	Eastern Province U21	
Players named in squads, but did not play
HK	Lumko Mbane	Released	
LK	Ben Jacobs	Released	
LK	Kevin Kaba	NMMU Madibaz	
SH	Kevin Plaatjies	Port Elizabeth Police	
FH	MC Venter	NMMU Madibaz	
CE	Foxy Ntleki	Old Selbornians	
WG	Aya Dlepu	NMMU Madibaz	
WG	Paul Perez	Sharks	

== Vodacom Cup ==
=== Log ===
Southern Section
Pos	Team	Pld	W	D	L	PF	PA	PD	TF	TA	TB	LB	Pts	Qualification
1	Western Province	7	7	0	0	188	103	+85	23	11	4	0	32	Qualified for quarter-finals
2	Griquas	7	6	0	1	205	138	+67	24	16	3	1	28	Qualified for quarter-finals
3	Free State XV	7	4	0	3	215	170	+45	28	17	4	2	22	Qualified for quarter-finals
4	SWD Eagles	7	4	0	3	193	137	+56	21	16	3	1	20	Qualified for quarter-finals
5	Eastern Province Kings	7	3	0	4	181	162	+19	26	18	3	2	17	
6	Sharks XV	7	2	0	5	180	165	+15	24	22	2	1	11	
7	Border Bulldogs	7	1	0	6	104	206	−102	11	28	1	1	6	
8	Boland Cavaliers	7	1	0	6	105	290	−185	15	44	1	0	5	

Rules for classification:
- Log points
- Overall points difference
- Number of tries scored
- Points scored in away matches
- Fewest red cards
- Toss of a coin
Points breakdown:
- 4 points for a win
- 2 points for a draw
- 1 bonus point for a loss by seven points or less
- 1 bonus point for scoring four or more tries in a match

=== Round-by-round ===
Team Progression – 2015 Vodacom Cup Southern Section
Team	R1	R2	R3	R4	R5	R6	R7
Opposition	GRQ	BDR	WPr	FSt	SWD	BOL	SHA
Cumulative Points	0	5	6	8	8	13	17
Southern Section Position	5th	6th	5th	5th	6th	5th	5th
Key:	win	draw	loss				

=== Fixtures and results ===
21 March 2015	Eastern Province Kings	19–27	Griquas	Nelson Mandela Bay Stadium, Port Elizabeth
15:00	Try: Thembelani Bholi 17'; Kevin Luiters 25'; Jaco Grobler 73'; Con: Gary van Aswegen 18' (1/2); Scott van Breda 74' (1/1); Pen: Gary van Aswegen (0/1)	Report; Scoreboard	Try: Carel Greeff 14'; Steph Roberts 62'; Abrie Griesel 65'; Con: Gouws Prinsloo 15', 63', 66' (3/3); Pen: Gouws Prinsloo 39', 53' (2/3); Cards: RJ Liebenberg (yellow card) 68'; Wendal Wehr (yellow card) 71' to 78'	Referee: Tahla Ntshakaza

27 March 2015	Border Bulldogs	17–27	Eastern Province Kings	Buffalo City Stadium, East London
19:10	Try: Ntando Kebe 57'; Sipho Nofemele 73'; Con: Oliver Zono 58', 74' (2/2); Pen: Masixole Banda 32' (1/2); Oliver Zono (0/1); Cards: Wandile Putuma (yellow card) 13' to 23'	Report; Scoreboard	Try: Paul Schoeman 14', 51', 66'; Simon Kerrod 24'; Con: Gary van Aswegen 25' (1/3); Scott van Breda 67' (1/1); Pen: Gary van Aswegen 3' (1/1)	Referee: Archie Sehlako

11 April 2015	Eastern Province Kings	13–19	Western Province	Nelson Mandela Bay Stadium, Port Elizabeth
19:00	Try: George Whitehead 35'; Sylvian Mahuza 61'; Con: George Whitehead (0/1); Pen: Scott van Breda 49' (1/1); Cards: Martin Ferreira (yellow card) 39' to 50'	Report; Scoreboard	Try: Godlen Masimla 68'; Con: Jean-Luc du Plessis 69' (1/1); Pen: Jean-Luc du Plessis 5', 20', 38', 40' (4/4); Cards: JP Lewis (yellow card) 78'	Referee: Stephan Geldenhuys

18 April 2015	Free State XV	50–45	Eastern Province Kings	Free State Stadium, Bloemfontein
16:30	Try: JP du Plessis 5'; Sergeal Petersen 15', 56'; Shaun Venter 25'; Joubert Engelbrecht 42'; Zingisa April 65'; Ludwig Erasmus 77'; Con: Niel Marais 6', 16', 26', 43', 57', 66' (6/6); Ludwig Erasmus (0/1); Pen: Ludwig Erasmus 76' (1/1); Cards: Shaun Venter (yellow card) 80'	Report; Scoreboard	Try: Tim Agaba 18'; Luther Obi 31'; Tim Whitehead 54', 59'; Siviwe Soyizwapi 70'; Con: Scott van Breda 19', 32', 54', 60' (4/5); Pen: Gary van Aswegen 8' (1/1); Scott van Breda 30', 63', 82' (3/4)	Referee: Quinton Immelman

25 April 2015	Eastern Province Kings	10–31	SWD Eagles	Nelson Mandela Bay Stadium, Port Elizabeth
15:00	Try: Luther Obi 20'; Simon Kerrod 80'; Con: Tony Jantjies (0/1); Hansie Graaff (0/1)	Report; Scoreboard	Try: Alshaun Bock 8'; Clinton Wagman 35'; Dwayne Kelly 72'; Con: Elric van Vuuren 9' (1/2); Gerrit Smith 73' (1/1); Pen: Elric van Vuuren 10', 15', 30' (3/3); Gerrit Smith 77' (1/1); Cards: Junior Bester (yellow card) 68'	Referee: Tahla Ntshakaza

2 May 2015	Boland Cavaliers	10–44	Eastern Province Kings	Central Sports Grounds, Citrusdal
16:00	Try: Granville Adams 20'; Con: Granville Adams 21' (1/1); Pen: Christian Rust (0/2); Granville Adams 38' (1/1)	Report; Scoreboard	Try: Aidon Davis 7', 31', 63'; Siviwe Soyizwapi 22'; Eital Bredenkamp 54'; Hansie Graaff 59'; Dylon Frylinck 74'; Con: Hansie Graaff 8', 32', 60' (3/7); Pen: Hansie Graaff 46' (1/1)	Attendance: 3,000; Referee: Pro Legoete

8 May 2015	Eastern Province Kings	23–8	Sharks XV	Nelson Mandela Bay Stadium, Port Elizabeth
19:00	Try: Luther Obi 21'; Paul Schoeman 46'; Enrico Acker 74'; Con: Hansie Graaff (0/2); Scott van Breda 75' (1/1); Pen: Hansie Graaff 6' (1/1); Scott van Breda 70' (1/1)	Report; Scoreboard	Try: Hanco Venter 23'; Con: Garth April (0/1); Pen: Garth April 15' (1/2); Cards: Paul Jordaan (yellow card) 20' to 30'	Attendance: 2,650; Referee: Cwengile Jadezweni

=== Player statistics ===
The following table shows players statistics for the 2015 Vodacom Cup season:

Player Statistics – 2015 Vodacom Cup
Player	Starts	Used Sub	Unused Sub	Points	Tries	Cons	Pens	DGs	YC	RC
Tom Botha	1	0	0	0	0	0	0	0	0	0
Lizo Gqoboka	6	1	0	0	0	0	0	0	0	0
Simon Kerrod	4	1	0	10	2	0	0	0	0	0
Charles Marais	2	1	0	0	0	0	0	0	0	0
Enoch Mnyaka	0	2	0	0	0	0	0	0	0	0
CJ van der Linde	1	2	0	0	0	0	0	0	0	0
Martin Ferreira	3	0	0	0	0	0	0	0	1	0
Edgar Marutlulle	4	2	0	0	0	0	0	0	0	0
Michael van Vuuren	0	4	1	0	0	0	0	0	0	0
David Bulbring	3	3	0	0	0	0	0	0	0	0
Tazz Fuzani	5	0	0	0	0	0	0	0	0	0
Cornell Hess	2	1	0	0	0	0	0	0	0	0
Cameron Lindsay	3	2	0	0	0	0	0	0	0	0
Tim Agaba	5	0	0	5	1	0	0	0	0	0
Thembelani Bholi	6	0	0	5	1	0	0	0	0	0
Eital Bredenkamp	2	1	0	5	1	0	0	0	0	0
Aidon Davis	1	2	0	15	3	0	0	0	0	0
Paul Schoeman	5	0	0	20	4	0	0	0	0	0
Luke Watson	0	2	0	0	0	0	0	0	0	0
Stefan Willemse	3	3	0	0	0	0	0	0	0	0
Enrico Acker	0	1	0	5	1	0	0	0	0	0
Dylon Frylinck	0	3	0	5	1	0	0	0	0	0
Jaco Grobler	5	2	0	5	1	0	0	0	0	0
Kevin Luiters	2	1	0	5	1	0	0	0	0	0
Tony Jantjies	1	1	0	0	0	0	0	0	0	0
Gary van Aswegen	3	0	0	10	0	2	2	0	0	0
George Whitehead	1	2	0	5	1	0	0	0	0	0
Ronnie Cooke	3	2	0	0	0	0	0	0	0	0
Shane Gates	3	0	0	0	0	0	0	0	0	0
Hansie Graaff	6	1	0	17	1	3	2	0	0	0
Siyanda Grey	5	1	0	0	0	0	0	0	0	0
Andile Jho	0	1	0	0	0	0	0	0	0	0
Marlou van Niekerk	0	1	0	0	0	0	0	0	0	0
Tim Whitehead	3	1	0	10	2	0	0	0	0	0
Sphu Msutwana	1	1	0	0	0	0	0	0	0	0
Luther Obi	4	0	0	15	3	0	0	0	0	0
Siviwe Soyizwapi	7	0	0	10	2	0	0	0	0	0
Sylvian Mahuza	2	0	0	5	1	0	0	0	0	0
Scott van Breda	3	3	0	29	0	7	5	0	0	0

- Albé de Swardt, Malcolm Jaer, Shaun McDonald, Vukile Sofisa, Jan Uys and CJ Velleman were named in the 2015 Vodacom Cup squad, but never included in a matchday 22.

=== Player appearances ===
The following players appeared for the Eastern Province Kings during the 2015 Vodacom Cup:

Player Appearances – 2015 Vodacom Cup
Player	GRQ	BDR	WPr	FSt	SWD	BOL	SHA
Lizo Gqoboka	1	17 (substituted on)	1	1	1	1	1
Martin Ferreira	2	2	2				
Tom Botha	3						
Tazz Fuzani	4	4	4	4			4
David Bulbring	5		18 (substituted on)	5	5	18 (substituted on)	18 (substituted on)
Eital Bredenkamp	6					6	19 (substituted on)
Thembelani Bholi	7	7	7	7		7	6
Tim Agaba	8	8	8	8	8		
Kevin Luiters	9	9	20 (substituted on)				
Gary van Aswegen	10	10		10			
Siyanda Grey	11	14	11		22 (substituted on)	13	14
Shane Gates	12	12	12				
Hansie Graaff	13	13	13	13	21 (substituted on)	10	10
Siviwe Soyizwapi	14	11	14	14	14	15	15
Sylvian Mahuza	15		15				
Michael van Vuuren	16 (substituted on)			16	16 (substituted on)	16 (substituted on)	16 (substituted on)
Charles Marais	17 (substituted on)	1	3				
Cameron Lindsay	18 (substituted on)	5	5	18 (substituted on)	4		
Aidon Davis	19 (substituted on)				18 (substituted on)	8	
Jaco Grobler	20 (substituted on)	20 (substituted on)	9	9	9	9	9
George Whitehead	21 (substituted on)	21 (substituted on)	10				
Scott van Breda	22 (substituted on)	15	22 (substituted on)	15	15		22 (substituted on)
Simon Kerrod		3	17 (substituted on)	3	3	3	
Paul Schoeman		6	6	6	6		8
Edgar Marutlulle		16 (substituted on)	16 (substituted on)	2	2	2	2
Cornell Hess		18 (substituted on)				5	5
Stefan Willemse		19 (substituted on)	19 (substituted on)	19 (substituted on)	7	4	7
Ronnie Cooke		22 (substituted on)		22 (substituted on)	13	12	13
Tim Whitehead			21 (substituted on)	12	12		12
Luther Obi				11	11	11	11
Enoch Mnyaka				17 (substituted on)			17 (substituted on)
Dylon Frylinck				20 (substituted on)	20 (substituted on)	20 (substituted on)	
Tony Jantjies				21 (substituted on)	10		
CJ van der Linde					17 (substituted on)	17 (substituted on)	3
Luke Watson					19 (substituted on)	19 (substituted on)	
Sphu Msutwana						14	21 (substituted on)
Marlou van Niekerk						21 (substituted on)	
Andile Jho						22 (substituted on)	
Enrico Acker							20 (substituted on)

- Albé de Swardt, Malcolm Jaer, Shaun McDonald, Vukile Sofisa, Jan Uys and CJ Velleman were named in the 2015 Vodacom Cup squad, but never included in a matchday 22.

== Currie Cup ==
=== Log ===
The final log of the round-robin stage of the 2015 Currie Cup Premier Division was:

2015 Currie Cup Premier Division log
Pos	Team	Pld	W	D	L	PF	PA	PD	TF	TA	TB	LB	Pts	Qualification
1	Golden Lions	10	10	0	0	430	217	+213	52	28	8	0	48	semi-finals
2	Blue Bulls	10	8	0	2	342	238	+104	41	26	7	0	39	semi-finals
3	Western Province	10	7	0	3	328	248	+80	38	27	6	1	35	semi-finals
4	Free State Cheetahs	10	3	2	5	268	320	−52	35	33	6	2	24	semi-finals
5	Sharks	10	4	1	5	261	269	−8	29	30	3	1	22	
6	Pumas	10	3	1	6	227	302	−75	23	36	1	2	17	
7	Eastern Province Kings	10	2	0	8	215	334	−119	23	42	2	2	12	
8	Griquas	10	1	0	9	219	362	−143	27	46	3	1	8	

Updated to match(es) played on 11 October 2015. Source:
Rules for classification: 4 points for a win; 2 points for a draw; 1 bonus point for a loss by seven points or less; 1 bonus point for scoring four or more tries in a match

=== Round-by-round ===
Team Progression – 2015 Currie Cup Premier Division
Team	R1	R2	R3	R4	R5	R6	R7	R8	R9	R10
Opposition	LIO	SHA	PMA	SHA	LIO	FSC	PMA	GRQ	BUL	WPr
Cumulative Points	0	1	2	3	3	7	7	12	12	12
Position	7th	7th	7th	7th	7th	7th	7th	7th	7th	7th
Key:	win	draw	loss							

=== Fixtures and results ===
8 August 2015	Eastern Province Kings	14–51	Golden Lions	Nelson Mandela Bay Stadium, Port Elizabeth
14:15	Try: Sylvian Mahuza 19'; Simon Kerrod 53'; Con: Scott van Breda 20', 54' (2/2); Cards: Schalk Ferreira (yellow card) 66' to 76'	Report; Scoreboard	Try: Kwagga Smith 1', 16', 68'; Courtnall Skosan 6'; Howard Mnisi 13'; Anthony Volmink 77'; Con: Marnitz Boshoff 69', 78', 2', 7', 14', 17' (6/6); Pen: Marnitz Boshoff 34', 50', 58' (3/3); Drop: Marnitz Boshoff (0/1)	Referee: Quinton Immelman

15 August 2015	Sharks	33–25	Eastern Province Kings	Kings Park Stadium, Durban
17:05	Try: André Esterhuizen 15'; Lionel Cronjé 17'; Dan du Preez 55'; Paul Jordaan 66'; Con: Joe Pietersen 18', 67' (2/4); Pen: Joe Pietersen 7', 25', 62' (3/3); Cards: Philip van der Walt (yellow card) 40' to 50'; Odwa Ndungane (yellow card) 73'	Report; Scoreboard	Try: George Whitehead 12'; Tim Agaba 40'; Steven Sykes 44'; Enrico Acker 47'; Con: Scott van Breda (0/2); George Whitehead 44' (1/2); Pen: Scott van Breda (0/1); George Whitehead 58' (1/1)	Referee: Marius van der Westhuizen

21 August 2015	Eastern Province Kings	13–15	Pumas	Nelson Mandela Bay Stadium, Port Elizabeth
19:00	Try: Lizo Gqoboka 61'; Con: Scott van Breda 62' (1/1); Pen: Scott van Breda 10', 48' (2/3); Cards: Steven Sykes (yellow card) 35' to 45'	Report; Scoreboard	Pen: JC Roos 3', 12', 56', 65', 76' (5/5)	Referee: Rasta Rasivhenge

29 August 2015	Eastern Province Kings	20–24	Sharks	Nelson Mandela Bay Stadium, Port Elizabeth
17:05	Try: Thembelani Bholi 3' penalty try 75'; Con: Scott van Breda 4', 75' (2/2); Pen: Scott van Breda 9', 32' (2/3); Cards: Siyanda Grey (yellow card) 25' to 35'	Report; Scoreboard	Try: Joe Pietersen 39'; Francois Kleinhans 48'; Dan du Preez 56'; Con: Joe Pietersen 40', 49', 57' (3/3); Pen: Joe Pietersen 61' (1/2); Cards: S'bura Sithole (yellow card) 75'	Referee: Jaco van Heerden

5 September 2015	Golden Lions	37–21	Eastern Province Kings	Ellis Park Stadium, Johannesburg
19:10	Try: penalty try 4'; Kwagga Smith 11'; Stokkies Hanekom 13'; Stephan de Wit 30'; Ruan Combrinck 83'; Con: Jaco van der Walt 5', 13' (2/4); Marnitz Boshoff 84' (1/1); Pen: Jaco van der Walt 40' (1/1); Marnitz Boshoff 70' (1/1); Drop: Marnitz Boshoff (0/1)	Report; Scoreboard	Try: Siyanda Grey 15'; Paul Schoeman 23', 55'; Con: Karlo Aspeling 16', 25', 56' (3/3); Cards: Eital Bredenkamp (yellow card) 76'; Hansie Graaff (red card) 83'	Referee: Stuart Berry

11 September 2015	Eastern Province Kings	32–24	Free State Cheetahs	Nelson Mandela Bay Stadium, Port Elizabeth
19:10	Try: Luther Obi 30'; Siyanda Grey 55'; Con: Scott van Breda 31', 56' (2/2); Pen: Scott van Breda 8', 14', 40', 61', 64', 70' (6/6); Cards: JP du Plessis (red card) 46'	Report; Scoreboard	Try: Gerhard Olivier 17'; Shaun Venter 21'; Clayton Blommetjies 34'; Cornal Hendricks 78'; Con: Fred Zeilinga 18', 22' (2/4)	Referee: Quinton Immelman

18 September 2015	Pumas	20–9	Eastern Province Kings	Mbombela Stadium, Mbombela
17:00	Try: Jason Fraser 14'; Marnus Schoeman 27'; Con: Justin van Staden 15', 28' (2/2); Pen: Justin van Staden 19', 43' (2/3)	Report; Scoreboard	Pen: Scott van Breda 8', 12', 30' (3/4); Cards: Thembelani Bholi (yellow card) 19' to 30'	Referee: Cwengile Jadezweni

26 September 2015	Eastern Province Kings	40–37	Griquas	Nelson Mandela Bay Stadium, Port Elizabeth
15:30	Try: Luther Obi 34'; Paul Schoeman 39', 50'; Tim Whitehead 57', 80'; Con: Scott van Breda 40', 58', 81' (3/5); Pen: Scott van Breda 2', 22', 27' (3/3)	Report; Scoreboard	Try: Danie Dames 4', 37'; Clinton Swart 24'; Carel Greeff 46'; AJ le Roux 68'; Con: Clinton Swart 25', 38', 47' (3/5); Pen: Clinton Swart 7', 32' (2/3)	Referee: Quinton Immelman

2 October 2015	Blue Bulls	48–27	Eastern Province Kings	Loftus Versfeld, Pretoria
19:10	Try: Lappies Labuschagné 26', 31'; Dries Swanepoel 49'; Francois Hougaard 55', 65'; Ruan Steenkamp 70'; Jacques du Plessis 78'; Con: Tian Schoeman 27', 32', 50', 56' (4/5); Louis Fouché 79' (1/2); Pen: Tian Schoeman 11' (1/1); Cards: Ruan Steenkamp (yellow card) 73'	Report; Scoreboard	Try: Tim Whitehead 20'; Elgar Watts 38'; JP du Plessis 74'; Con: Scott van Breda 21', 39', 75' (3/3); Pen: Scott van Breda 7', 35' (2/2); Cards: Edgar Marutlulle (yellow card) 48' to 58'; Schalk Ferreira (yellow card) 69'	Referee: Pro Legoete

9 October 2015	Western Province	45–14	Eastern Province Kings	Newlands Stadium, Cape Town
18:00	Try: Nizaam Carr 2'; Juan de Jongh 30'; Godlen Masimla 34'; Dillyn Leyds 42', 80'; Justin Benn 57'; Con: Robert du Preez 3', 31', 35', 43' (4/4); Kurt Coleman 58', 81' (2/2); Pen: Robert du Preez 13' (1/1)	Report; Scoreboard	Try: Enrico Acker 36'; Con: Scott van Breda (0/1); Pen: Scott van Breda 8', 17', 28' (3/3)	Referee: Pro Legoete

=== Player appearances ===
The player appearance record in the 2015 Currie Cup Premier Division is as follows:

Eastern Province Kings
Name	LIO	SHA	PMA	SHA	LIO	FSC	PMA	GRQ	BUL	WPr	SF	F	App	Try	Kck	Pts
Schalk Ferreira	1	1	1	17 (substituted on)		17 (substituted on)	1	1	17 (substituted on)	17 (substituted on)	—N/a	—N/a	9	0	0	0
Martin Ferreira	2	2	2	2		2	2	2	2	16 (substituted on)	—N/a	—N/a	9	0	0	0
Tom Botha	3	3	3	3		3	3	3	3		—N/a	—N/a	8	0	0	0
Steven Sykes	4	4	4	4		4	4	4	4		—N/a	—N/a	8	1	0	5
Cornell Hess	5	5	5	5	18 (substituted on)	19	19 (substituted on)	5	5	5	—N/a	—N/a	9	0	0	0
Luke Watson (c)	6	6		6							—N/a	—N/a	3	0	0	0
Stefan Willemse	7	7		19 (substituted on)	7	5	5	7	7	4	—N/a	—N/a	9	0	0	0
Tim Agaba	8	8	8	8		8	8	20	20 (substituted on)	8	—N/a	—N/a	8	1	0	5
Enrico Acker	9	9	9	9	20 (substituted on)	9	9	21 (substituted on)	9	9	—N/a	—N/a	10	2	0	10
George Whitehead	10	10									—N/a	—N/a	2	1	5	10
Luther Obi	11	11	11	11		11	11	11	11	11	—N/a	—N/a	9	2	0	10
Tim Whitehead	12	12			12	12	12	12	12		—N/a	—N/a	7	3	0	15
JP du Plessis	13	13	12	12	22 (substituted on)	13	13	13	13	12	—N/a	—N/a	10	1	0	5
Sylvian Mahuza	14				11			14	14	14	—N/a	—N/a	5	1	0	5
Scott van Breda	15	15	15	15		15	15	15	15	15	—N/a	—N/a	9	0	89	89
Michael van Vuuren	16 (substituted on)				16 (substituted on)						—N/a	—N/a	2	0	0	0
Simon Kerrod	17 (substituted on)	18 (substituted on)	18 (substituted on)	18 (substituted on)	3	18 (substituted on)	18 (substituted on)	18 (substituted on)	18 (substituted on)	3	—N/a	—N/a	10	1	0	5
Jacques Engelbrecht	18 (substituted on)	19 (substituted on)	7			20	20 (substituted on)	8	8	7	—N/a	—N/a	7	0	0	0
Paul Schoeman	19 (substituted on)		20 (substituted on)	20 (substituted on)	8	6	6	6	19 (substituted on)	20 (substituted on)	—N/a	—N/a	9	4	0	20
Kevin Luiters	20 (substituted on)	21 (substituted on)	21 (substituted on)								—N/a	—N/a	3	0	0	0
Karlo Aspeling	21 (substituted on)	22 (substituted on)	10	10	10	10	10	10	22 (substituted on)	22	—N/a	—N/a	9	0	6	6
Siyanda Grey	22 (substituted on)	14	14	14	14	14	14				—N/a	—N/a	7	2	0	10
Edgar Marutlulle		16 (substituted on)	16 (substituted on)	16 (substituted on)	2	16 (substituted on)	16 (substituted on)	16 (substituted on)	16 (substituted on)	2	—N/a	—N/a	9	0	0	0
Lizo Gqoboka		17 (substituted on)	17 (substituted on)	1	1	1	17 (substituted on)		1	1	—N/a	—N/a	8	1	0	5
Thembelani Bholi		20 (substituted on)	6	7	6	7	7	19 (substituted on)	6	6	—N/a	—N/a	9	1	0	5
Ronnie Cooke			13	13	13					13	—N/a	—N/a	4	0	0	0
Cameron Lindsay			19		5						—N/a	—N/a	1	0	0	0
Hansie Graaff			22	22	15						—N/a	—N/a	1	0	0	0
Dwayne Kelly				21 (substituted on)	9	21	21 (substituted on)	9	21 (substituted on)	21 (substituted on)	—N/a	—N/a	6	0	0	0
Tazz Fuzani					4						—N/a	—N/a	1	0	0	0
Basil Short					17 (substituted on)			17 (substituted on)		18 (substituted on)	—N/a	—N/a	3	0	0	0
Eital Bredenkamp					19 (substituted on)						—N/a	—N/a	1	0	0	0
Elgar Watts					21 (substituted on)	22 (substituted on)	22 (substituted on)	22 (substituted on)	10	10	—N/a	—N/a	6	1	0	5
David Bulbring										19 (substituted on)	—N/a	—N/a	1	0	0	0
penalty try													–	1	–	5
Total													10	23	100	215
Michael Bernardt, Albé de Swardt, Shane Gates, Siviwe Soyizwapi, Gary van Aswegen and Marlou van Niekerk were named in the Currie Cup Premier Division squad, but not included in a matchday squad.

== Under-21 Provincial Championship ==
=== Log ===
The final league standings for the 2015 Under-21 Provincial Championship Group A were: (Note: There is a discrepancy with the result for the Round Three match between the Golden Lions U21 and Leopards U21 on the official South African Rugby Union website. The Final Score is given as 17–29 – which was also the result reported by the Golden Lions' official Twitter account – but the sum of the individual scores in the match add up to a 12–29 result. A third try for the Leopards U21s is seemingly missing from the match breakdown (this is also backed up by a 42nd-minute conversion being scored with no corresponding try), but has been included on this page. The tries for and tries against for the Golden Lions U21 don't correspond with the sum of tries in the match reports, plus the logs indicate that Leopards U21 got five four-try bonus points, while they only got four bonus points according to the match reports.)

2015 Under-21 Provincial Championship Group A standings
Pos	Team	P	W	D	L	PF	PA	PD	TF	TA	TB	LB	Pts
1	Western Province U21	12	10	1	1	451	267	+184	59	36	9	1	52
2	Free State U21	12	8	1	3	475	265	+210	68	35	9	2	45
3	Sharks U21	12	7	1	4	323	316	+7	39	43	6	1	37
4	Golden Lions U21	12	6	0	6	411	284	+127	56	36	7	4	35
5	Blue Bulls U21	12	6	1	5	353	376	−23	49	47	7	1	34
6	Leopards U21	12	2	0	10	262	501	−239	37	71	4	0	12
7	Eastern Province U21	12	1	0	11	208	474	−266	28	68	1	0	5

Legend and competition rules
Legend:
The top four teams qualified to the semi-finals.	P = Games played, W = Games won, D = Games drawn, L = Games lost, PF = Points for, PA = Points against, PD = Points difference, TF = Tries for, TA = Tries against, TB = Try bonus points, LB = Losing bonus points, Pts = Log points
Competition rules:
Play-offs: The top four teams qualified to the semi-finals, with the higher-placed team having home advantage. Points breakdown: * 4 points for a win * 2 points for a draw * 1 bonus point for a loss by seven points or less * 1 bonus point for scoring four or more tries in a match

=== Round-by-round ===
Team Progression – 2015 Under-21 Provincial Championship Group A
Team	R1	R2	R3	R4	R5	R6	R7	R8	R9	R10	R11	R12	R13	R14
Opposition	FSC	LEO	WPR	BUL	LIO	SHA	—N/a	SHA	LIO	FSC	—N/a	LEO	BUL	WPR
Cumulative Points	0	0	0	0	0	0	0	4	4	4	4	4	4	5
Position	7th	7th	7th	7th	7th	7th	7th	7th	7th	7th	7th	7th	7th	7th
Key:	win	draw	loss	bye										

=== Fixtures and results ===
11 July 2015	Free State U21	58–12	Eastern Province U21	Shimla Park, Bloemfontein
14:45	Try: Steven Meiring 11', 60'; Carel-Jan Coetzee 18'; Boela Venter 21'; Henry Immelman 52'; Jasper Wiese 56'; André Swarts 63'; Günther Janse van Vuuren 65'; Nico Lee 74'; Con: André Swarts 22', 53', 57', 64', 75' (5/9); Pen: André Swarts 33' (1/1); Cards: Daniel Maartens (yellow card) 49' to 59'	Report; Scoreboard	Try: Wynand Grassmann 68', 71'; Con: Malcolm Jaer 72' (1/2); Cards: CJ Velleman (yellow card) 14' to 24'	Referee: Tahla Ntshakaza

18 July 2015	Leopards U21	28–8	Eastern Province U21	Olën Park, Potchefstroom
13:00	Try: Jaco Hayward 17', 44'; Walt Steenkamp 38'; Jeandré Rudolph 57'; Con: Schalk Hugo 18', 39', 45', 58' (4/4)	Report; Scoreboard	Try: Malcolm Jaer 11'; Con: Simon Bolze (0/1); Pen: Simon Bolze 43' (1/1); Cards: CJ Velleman (yellow card) 35' to 45'	Referee: Rodney Boneparte

25 July 2015	Eastern Province U21	13–44	Western Province U21	Nelson Mandela Bay Stadium, Port Elizabeth
16:15	Try: Malcolm Jaer 10'; Somila Jho 74'; Con: Simon Bolze (0/2); Pen: Simon Bolze 2' (1/1); Cards: Jayson Reinecke (yellow card) 67' to 77'	Report; Scoreboard	Try: Johan Momsen 16'; Ryan Oosthuizen 26'; Daniël du Plessis 57'; Luke Stringer 62' penalty try 66'; Jason Worrall 78'; Con: Brandon Thomson 58', 63', 67', 79' (4/6); Pen: Brandon Thomson 9', 47' (2/4)	Referee: Lourens van der Merwe

31 July 2015	Eastern Province U21	20–39	Blue Bulls U21	Wolfson Stadium, KwaZakele
17:00	Try: Tyler Paul 46'; Lindelwe Zungu 79'; Con: Simon Bolze 47' (1/1); Malcolm Jaer 80' (1/1); Pen: Simon Bolze 21', 31' (2/2)	Report; Scoreboard	Try: Marco van Staden 38', 74'; Marquit September 57', 69'; Jixie Molapo 65'; Con: Kobus Marais 39', 58' (2/2); Joshua Stander 66', 70' (2/3); Pen: Kobus Marais 42', 45' (2/2); Cards: Matthys Basson (yellow card) 19' to 29'

8 August 2015	Eastern Province U21	14–73	Golden Lions U21	Nelson Mandela Bay Stadium, Port Elizabeth
11:30	Try: Lindelwe Zungu 58'; Davron Cameron 71'; Con: Simon Bolze 59' (1/1); Davron Cameron 72' (1/1)	Report; Scoreboard	Try: Brandan Hewitt 9'; Jano Venter 14', 79'; Christiaan Meyer 18'; Cyle Brink 38'; Bobby de Wee 40'; Ramone Samuels 51'; Rohan Janse van Rensburg 54', 81'; Koch Marx 66'; Gavin Delport 77'; Con: Brandan Hewitt 10', 15', 19', 39', 52', 55', 67' (7/8); Shaun Reynolds 78', 80' (2/3)	Referee: Stephan Geldenhuys

15 August 2015	Sharks U21	32–20	Eastern Province U21	Kings Park Stadium, Durban
14:45	Try: Alrin Eksteen 5'; Inny Radebe 8', 22'; Graham Geldenhuys 29'; Con: Inny Radebe 9', 23', 30' (3/4); Pen: Inny Radebe 60', 70' (2/2)	Report; Scoreboard	Try: Khaya Malotana 35'; Warren Swarts 54'; Anelisa Mteto 67'; Con: MC Venter 55' (1/3); Pen: MC Venter 7' (1/2)	Referee: Cwengile Jadezweni

29 August 2015	Eastern Province U21	25–15	Sharks U21	Nelson Mandela Bay Stadium, Port Elizabeth
14:30	Try: Franswa Ueckermann 36'; Somila Jho 53', 56'; Con: MC Venter 37', 54' (2/3); Pen: MC Venter 24' (1/1); Franswa Ueckermann 75' (1/1)	Report; Scoreboard	Pen: Inny Radebe 5', 9', 39', 46' (4/5); Rowan Gouws 70' (1/2)	Referee: Jaco Pretorius

5 September 2015	Golden Lions U21	40–24	Eastern Province U21	Ellis Park Stadium, Johannesburg
16:45	Try: Ramone Samuels 4'; Aphiwe Dyantyi 14'; Cyle Brink 42'; Victor Sekekete 62'; Thabo Mabuza 67'; Gerdus van der Walt 79'; Con: Brandan Hewitt 5', 15', 43' (3/3); Shaun Reynolds 63', 68' (2/3); Cards: Pieter Jansen (yellow card) 82'	Report; Scoreboard	Try: CJ Velleman 6', 75'; Leighton van Wyk 51'; Con: MC Venter 7', 52', 76' (3/3); Pen: MC Venter 40' (1/2); Cards: Somila Jho (yellow card) 62'; Luvo Claassen (yellow card) 82'	Referee: AJ Jacobs

11 September 2015	Eastern Province U21	15–33	Free State U21	Nelson Mandela Bay Stadium, Port Elizabeth
16:30	Try: Somila Jho 7', 29'; Con: MC Venter 8' (1/2); Pen: Leighton van Wyk 24' (1/2)	Report; Scoreboard	Try: Steven Meiring 16', 34'; JC Fourie 42'; Stephan Janse van Rensburg 54', 65'; Con: Arrie Vosloo 17', 35' (2/2); Barend Bornman 43', 55' (2/2); Stephan Janse van Rensburg (0/1)	Referee: Archie Sehlako

26 September 2015	Eastern Province U21	16–24	Leopards U21	Nelson Mandela Bay Stadium, Port Elizabeth
12:45	Try: Sibusiso Ngcokovane 22'; Malcolm Jaer 65'; Con: MC Venter (0/2); Pen: MC Venter 10', 14' (2/3); Cards: Malcolm Jaer (yellow card) 26' to 36'; JP Jamieson (yellow card) 35' to 45'	Report; Scoreboard	Try: Estehan Visagie 7', 78'; Myburgh Briers 38'; Gene Willemse 68'; Con: Myburgh Briers 69', 79' (2/4); Pen: Myburgh Briers (0/1); Cards: Gideon van der Merwe (yellow card) 13' to 23'	Referee: Renier Vermeulen

2 October 2015	Blue Bulls U21	43–10	Eastern Province U21	Loftus Versfeld, Pretoria
16:40	Try: Dayan van der Westhuizen 3'; Duhan van der Merwe 11'; Joshua Stander 27'; Philip Orffer 34'; Dan Kriel 41'; Jason Jenkins 71'; Njabulo Gumede 79'; Con: Joshua Stander 4', 28', 35', 72' (4/6); Dewald Human (0/1)	Report; Scoreboard	Try: Malcolm Jaer 1'; Con: Leighton van Wyk 2' (1/1); Pen: Leighton van Wyk 4' (1/1); Cards: Leighton van Wyk (yellow card) 31' to 42'; CJ Velleman (yellow card) 32' to 42'; Jan Uys (yellow card) 77'	Referee: AJ Jacobs

9 October 2015	Western Province U21	45–31	Eastern Province U21	Newlands Stadium, Cape Town
15:45	Try: Marcus Kleinbooi 6'; EW Viljoen 16', 31'; JD Schickerling 22'; Christo van der Merwe 28', 66' penalty try 52'; Con: Brandon Thomson 17', 23', 32', 53', 67' (5/7)	Report; Scoreboard	Try: CJ Velleman 9'; Warren Swarts 39'; Franswa Ueckermann 44', 65'; Wynand Grassmann 79'; Con: Leighton van Wyk 40', 45', 66' (3/4); Lindelwe Zungu (0/1); Cards: Stephan Ebersohn (yellow card) 48'; CJ Velleman (yellow card) 50'; Wynand Grassmann (yellow card) 57'	Referee: Stephan Geldenhuys

=== Player Record ===
The player record in the 2015 Under-21 Provincial Championship Group A is as follows:

Eastern Province Kings Under-21
Player	FSC	LEO	WPR	BUL	LIO	SHA	SHA	LIO	FSC	LEO	BUL	WPR	SF	F	Sta	Sub	Unu	Pts	Try	Con	Pen	DG	Red card	Temporarily suspended
David Murray	1	1	1	1	1	1	1	1	1	1	1	1	—N/a	—N/a	12	0	0	0	0	0	0	0	0	0
JP Jamieson	2	2	2	2	16 (substituted on)	2	16 (substituted on)	2	2	2	2	2	—N/a	—N/a	10	2	0	0	0	0	0	0	0	1
Kabous van Schalkwyk	3						3						—N/a	—N/a	2	0	0	0	0	0	0	0	0	0
Gerrit Huisamen	4	4	4	4	4	4	4						—N/a	—N/a	7	0	0	0	0	0	0	0	0	0
Jan Uys	5	5	5	5	5	5	5	18 (substituted on)	4	4	4		—N/a	—N/a	10	1	0	0	0	0	0	0	0	1
CJ Velleman	6	6					6	6		6	6	6	—N/a	—N/a	7	0	0	15	3	0	0	0	0	4
Brandon Brown	7		6	18 (substituted on)	18 (substituted on)	6	18 (substituted on)	7	7	7	7	7	—N/a	—N/a	8	3	0	0	0	0	0	0	0	0
Wynand Grassmann	8	18 (substituted on)			19 (substituted on)	19	19 (substituted on)	4	18 (substituted on)	18 (substituted on)	18 (substituted on)	4	—N/a	—N/a	3	6	1	15	3	0	0	0	0	1
Franswa Ueckermann	9	9	9				9	9	9		9	9	—N/a	—N/a	8	0	0	18	3	0	1	0	0	0
Simon Bolze	10	10	10	10	10						21 (substituted on)		—N/a	—N/a	5	1	0	16	0	2	4	0	0	0
Lindelwe Zungu	11	14	14	11	14	14	14	11	11	11		22 (substituted on)	—N/a	—N/a	10	1	0	10	2	0	0	0	0	0
Luan Nieuwoudt	12	12	21 (substituted on)	22 (substituted on)	21 (substituted on)								—N/a	—N/a	2	3	0	0	0	0	0	0	0	0
Somila Jho	13	13	11	14	22 (substituted on)	13	13	13	13	21 (substituted on)	13	13	—N/a	—N/a	10	2	0	25	5	0	0	0	0	1
Mihlali Nchukana	14	22 (substituted on)	22 (substituted on)	21 (substituted on)		22 (substituted on)		22 (substituted on)					—N/a	—N/a	1	5	0	0	0	0	0	0	0	0
Malcolm Jaer	15	15	15	15	15		15		15	15	15	15	—N/a	—N/a	10	0	0	24	4	2	0	0	0	1
Jedwyn Harty	16 (substituted on)	16 (substituted on)				16 (substituted on)	2	16 (substituted on)	16 (substituted on)	16 (substituted on)	16 (substituted on)		—N/a	—N/a	1	7	0	0	0	0	0	0	0	0
Matthew Moore	17 (substituted on)	3					17 (substituted on)	17 (substituted on)			17 (substituted on)		—N/a	—N/a	1	4	0	0	0	0	0	0	0	0
Tyler Paul	18 (substituted on)	7	7	7	7	7	7	5	5	5	5	5	—N/a	—N/a	11	1	0	5	1	0	0	0	0	0
Elandré van der Merwe	19 (substituted on)												—N/a	—N/a	0	1	0	0	0	0	0	0	0	0
Luvo Claassen	20	20 (substituted on)	20	20 (substituted on)	20 (substituted on)	20 (substituted on)	20 (substituted on)	20 (substituted on)	20 (substituted on)	20 (substituted on)	20 (substituted on)	20 (substituted on)	—N/a	—N/a	0	10	2	0	0	0	0	0	0	1
Warren Swarts	21 (substituted on)	11				15	11	15	22 (substituted on)		10	10	—N/a	—N/a	6	2	0	10	2	0	0	0	0	0
Jacquis Oosthuizen	22 (substituted on)												—N/a	—N/a	0	1	0	0	0	0	0	0	0	0
Kevin Kaba		8	8	8		8	8	8	8	8	8	8	—N/a	—N/a	10	0	0	0	0	0	0	0	0	0
Thembelihle Yase		17 (substituted on)	17 (substituted on)	3	3	3		3	3				—N/a	—N/a	5	2	0	0	0	0	0	0	0	0
Andrew Hughes		19 (substituted on)	19	19 (substituted on)	8								—N/a	—N/a	1	2	1	0	0	0	0	0	0	0
Riaan Esterhuizen		21 (substituted on)	12	12	12	12							—N/a	—N/a	4	1	0	0	0	0	0	0	0	0
Ronnie Beyl			3	17 (substituted on)	17 (substituted on)	17 (substituted on)			17 (substituted on)	17 (substituted on)		17 (substituted on)	—N/a	—N/a	1	6	0	0	0	0	0	0	0	0
Sam Bedlow			13	13	13		12	12	21 (substituted on)	12			—N/a	—N/a	6	1	0	0	0	0	0	0	0	0
Cameron van Heerden			16 (substituted on)	16 (substituted on)	2								—N/a	—N/a	1	2	0	0	0	0	0	0	0	0
Jayson Reinecke			18 (substituted on)	6	6	18 (substituted on)		19 (substituted on)	6	19	19 (substituted on)	19 (substituted on)	—N/a	—N/a	3	5	1	0	0	0	0	0	0	1
Davron Cameron				9	9								—N/a	—N/a	2	0	0	7	1	1	0	0	0	0
Ivan-John du Preez					11					22 (substituted on)	11	11	—N/a	—N/a	3	1	0	0	0	0	0	0	0	0
Sibusiso Ngcokovane						9				9			—N/a	—N/a	2	0	0	5	1	0	0	0	0	0
MC Venter						10	10	10	10	10	22 (substituted on)		—N/a	—N/a	5	1	0	29	0	7	5	0	0	0
Khaya Malotana						11	22 (substituted on)	14	14	14	14	14	—N/a	—N/a	6	1	0	5	1	0	0	0	0	0
Anelisa Mteto						21 (substituted on)						21 (substituted on)	—N/a	—N/a	0	2	0	5	1	0	0	0	0	0
Leighton van Wyk							21 (substituted on)	21 (substituted on)	12	13	12	12	—N/a	—N/a	4	2	0	19	1	4	2	0	0	1
Justin Hollis									19 (substituted on)			18	—N/a	—N/a	0	1	1	0	0	0	0	0	0	0
Stephan Ebersohn										3	3	3	—N/a	—N/a	3	0	0	0	0	0	0	0	0	1
Arno Lotter												16 (substituted on)	—N/a	—N/a	0	1	0	0	0	0	0	0	0	0
Legend: SF = semi-final, F = final, Sta = Starts, Sub = Substitute appearances, Unu = Unused substitute, Pts = Points, Try = Tries, Con = Conversions, Pen = Penalties, DG = Drop goals, (red card) = Sent off, (yellow card) = Sin-binned. Martin Keller, Qhama Mvimbi, Rameez Nell, Philip Odendaal and Erwin Slabbert were named in the 2015 Under-21 Provincial Championship Group A squad, but not yet included in a matchday 22.

== Under-19 Provincial Championship ==
The final league standings for the 2015 Under-19 Provincial Championship Group A were: (Note: Some tries are erroneously not included in the official log. Eastern Province U19 and the Free State Cheetahs U19 scored three tries apiece in their Round One match, which aren't included in the official logs. Further tries by the Eastern Province U19 and Leopards U19 sides against the Sharks U19 are also not included.)

2015 Under-19 Provincial Championship Group A standings
Pos	Team	P	W	D	L	PF	PA	PD	TF	TA	TB	LB	Pts
1	Eastern Province U19	12	11	0	1	339	215	+124	41	28	6	0	50
2	Blue Bulls U19	12	9	0	3	425	319	+106	59	41	8	0	44
3	Western Province U19	12	8	1	3	333	265	+68	40	37	7	1	42
4	Free State U19	12	4	2	6	336	398	−62	53	54	7	1	28
5	Golden Lions U19	12	5	0	7	324	300	+24	44	40	5	2	27
6	Leopards U19	12	2	0	10	303	459	−156	47	65	7	2	17
7	Sharks U19	12	1	1	10	233	337	−104	29	48	3	3	12

Legend and competition rules
Legend:
The top four teams qualified to the semi-finals.	P = Games played, W = Games won, D = Games drawn, L = Games lost, PF = Points for, PA = Points against, PD = Points difference, TF = Tries for, TA = Tries against, TB = Try bonus points, LB = Losing bonus points, Pts = Log points
Competition rules:
Play-offs: The top four teams qualified to the semi-finals, with the higher-placed team having home advantage. Points breakdown: * 4 points for a win * 2 points for a draw * 1 bonus point for a loss by seven points or less * 1 bonus point for scoring four or more tries in a match

=== Round-by-round ===
Team Progression – 2015 Under-19 Provincial Championship Group A
Team	R1	R2	R3	R4	R5	R6	R7	R8	R9	R10	R11	R12	R13	R14	SF	F
Opposition	FSC	LEO	WPR	BUL	LIO	SHA	—N/a	SHA	LIO	FSC	—N/a	LEO	BUL	WPR	FSC	BUL
Cumulative Points	4	9	13	17	21	26	26	31	36	41	41	46	46	50		
Log Position	2nd	2nd	1st	1st	1st	1st	1st	1st	1st	1st	1st	1st	1st	1st		
Key:	win	draw	loss	bye												

=== Matches ===
11 July 2015	Free State U19	15–28	Eastern Province U19	Shimla Park, Bloemfontein
13:00	Try: Charl Pretorius 8'; Rohan Roelofse 33', 36'; Con: Christiaan Nel (0/3)	Report; Scoreboard	Try: Junior Pokomela 42'; Mabhutana Peter 56'; Dominik Uytenbogaardt 69'; Con: Michael Brink (0/1); James Hall 57', 70' (2/2); Pen: Michael Brink 7', 30' (2/3); James Hall 67' (1/1); Drop: Michael Brink (0/1)	Referee: Ricus van der Hoven

18 July 2015	Leopards U19	24–41	Eastern Province U19	Olën Park, Potchefstroom
11:00	Try: Wilbri Gunter 51'; Benhard Janse van Rensburg 62'; James Engelbrecht 66'; Eon Buhrmann 70'; Con: Benhard Janse van Rensburg (0/1); Siya Masuku 71' (1/2); James Engelbrecht 67' (1/1)	Report; Scoreboard	Try: Junior Pokomela 10'; Jeremy Ward 17'; Mabhutana Peter 33'; NJ Oosthuizen 38'; Tango Balekile 47'; Hayden Tharratt 54'; Con: Jordan Koekemoer 11' (1/1); James Hall 18', 39', 48' (3/5); Pen: James Hall 41' (1/1); Cards: James Hall (yellow card) 4' to 14'	Referee: Tahla Ntshakaza

25 July 2015	Eastern Province U19	13–10	Western Province U19	Nelson Mandela Bay Stadium, Port Elizabeth
14:00	Try: Jeremy Ward 29'; Con: Michael Brink 30' (1/1); Pen: Michael Brink 22', 42' (2/2)	Report; Scoreboard	Try: Michael Kumbirai 7'; Con: Aidynn Cupido 8' (1/1); Pen: Aidynn Cupido 11' (1/2); Cards: Mitchell Carstens (yellow card) 28' to 38'	Referee: Oregopotse Rametsi

31 July 2015	Eastern Province U19	24–15	Blue Bulls U19	Wolfson Stadium, KwaZakele
15:00	Try: Athi Mayinje 17'; Junior Pokomela 56'; Con: Michael Brink 18' (1/2); Pen: Michael Brink 4', 46', 54', 63' (4/5)	Report; Scoreboard	Try: Sam Mitchell 13'; Divan Rossouw 22'; Con: Tinus de Beer 23' (1/2); Pen: Tinus de Beer 6' (1/1); Cards: Stephan Enslin (yellow card) 16' to 26'; Gavin van den Berg (yellow card) 45' to 55'	Referee: Vusi Msibi

8 August 2015	Eastern Province U19	28–19	Golden Lions U19	Nelson Mandela Bay Stadium, Port Elizabeth
09:30	Try: Lusanda Badiyana 52'; Yamkela Nyalambisa 57'; Athi Mayinje 68'; Con: Jeremy Ward 53', 69' (2/3); Pen: Michael Brink 5', 39', 62' (3/5)	Report; Scoreboard	Try: Mac Muller 47'; Con: Hendrik Mulder 48' (1/1); Pen: Hendrik Mulder 11', 17', 28', 34' (4/4)	Referee: Francois Pretorius

15 August 2015	Sharks U19	24–34	Eastern Province U19	Kings Park Stadium, Durban
13:00	Try: Cameron McNab 4', 47'; Tristan Blewett 22'; Morné Joubert 66'; Con: Tristan Tedder 4', 22' (2/4); Pen: Tristan Tedder (0/1); Cards: Tristan Blewett (yellow card) 51' to 61'	Report; Scoreboard	Try: Athi Mayinje 8'; Lusanda Badiyana 35' penalty try 51'; Hayden Tharratt 57'; Yamkela Nyalambisa 60'; Con: Jordan Koekemoer 35' (1/2); Michael Brink 51', 60' (2/3); Pen: Jordan Koekemoer 17' (1/1); Cards: SF Nieuwoudt (yellow card) 46' to 56'	Referee: Tahla Ntshakaza

29 August 2015	Eastern Province U19	26–7	Sharks U19	Nelson Mandela Bay Stadium, Port Elizabeth
12:15	Try: Michael Brink 5'; Junior Pokomela 10'; Keanu Vers 47'; SF Nieuwoudt 65'; Con: Michael Brink 6', 11', 48' (3/4)	Report; Scoreboard	Try: Wikus Badenhorst 14'; Con: Tristan Tedder 15' (1/1); Cards: Tristan Blewett (red card) 57'	Referee: Jacques Nieuwenhuis

5 September 2015	Golden Lions U19	22–34	Eastern Province U19	Ellis Park Stadium, Johannesburg
14:45	Try: Curtis Jonas 40'; Jaydrin Kotze 55'; Jo-Hanko de Villiers 67'; Con: Hendrik Mulder 56', 68' (2/3); Pen: Hendrik Mulder 9' (1/1); Cards: Juandré Michau (yellow card) 71'	Report; Scoreboard	Try: Jeremy Ward 5'; SF Nieuwoudt 17'; Keanu Vers 24'; Athi Mayinje 46'; Con: Michael Brink 6', 18', 25', 47' (4/4); Pen: Michael Brink 12', 61' (2/2)	Referee: Ricus van der Hoven

11 September 2015	Eastern Province U19	29–10	Free State U19	Nelson Mandela Bay Stadium, Port Elizabeth
14:15	Try: Junior Pokomela 26', 32'; Athi Mayinje 43'; Jordan Koekemoer 67'; Con: Michael Brink 27', 33', 44' (3/4); Pen: Michael Brink 2' (1/1)	Report; Scoreboard	Try: Ruan Wasserman 63'; Con: Ruan Wasserman 64' (1/1); Pen: Ruan Wasserman 29' (1/2)	Referee: Jacques Nieuwenhuis

26 September 2015	Eastern Province U19	33–14	Leopards U19	Nelson Mandela Bay Stadium, Port Elizabeth
10:30	Try: Lusanda Badiyana 3'; James Hall 18'; SF Nieuwoudt 32'; Athi Mayinje 45'; Jeremy Ward 58'; Con: Michael Brink 4', 19' (2/2); James Hall 33', 46' (2/3); Cards: SF Nieuwoudt (yellow card) 47' to 57'	Report; Scoreboard	Try: De Wet Terblanche 20'; Zweli Silaule 53'; Con: Benhard Janse van Rensburg 21', 54' (2/2); Pen: Benhard Janse van Rensburg (0/1)	Referee: Jabian Jeftha

2 October 2015	Blue Bulls U19	49–26	Eastern Province U19	Loftus Versfeld, Pretoria
15:00	Try: Franco Naudé 2', 12', 21'; Divan Rossouw 40'; Ruan de Beer 55'; Kurt Webster 66'; Con: JT Jackson 2', 12', 22', 41', 56' (5/6); Pen: JT Jackson 45', 60', 64' (3/3); Cards: Justin Meintjies (yellow card) 24' to 34'; Hendré Stassen (yellow card) 52' to 64'	Report; Scoreboard	Try: SF Nieuwoudt 26', 34'; Con: James Hall 26', 34' (2/2); Pen: James Hall 17', 38', 44', 52' (4/4); Drop: Garrick Mattheus (0/1)	Referee: Francois Pretorius

9 October 2015	Western Province U19	6–23	Eastern Province U19	Newlands Stadium, Cape Town
13:45	Pen: Tiaan Swanepoel 21', 35' (2/3)	Report; Scoreboard	Try: Junior Pokomela 11'; SF Nieuwoudt 24'; Con: Michael Brink 12', 25' (2/2); Pen: James Hall 3' (1/2); Michael Brink 14', 33' (2/3)	Referee: Lourens van der Merwe

Semi-final	16 October 2015	Eastern Province U19	31–15	Free State U19	Nelson Mandela Bay Stadium, Port Elizabeth
	15:00	Try: Mabhutana Peter 6'; NJ Oosthuizen 13'; Junior Pokomela 52'; Con: Michael Brink 7', 53' (2/3); Pen: Michael Brink 4', 45', 50', 63' (4/4); Garrick Mattheus (0/1); Cards: Tango Balekile (yellow card) 40' to 55'; SF Nieuwoudt (yellow card) 65'	Report; Scoreboard	Try: Janu Botha 22'; Victor Maruping 46'; Glen Eriksen 67'; Con: Ruan Wasserman (0/2); Glen Eriksen (0/1)	Referee: Stephan Geldenhuys

Final	24 October 2015	Eastern Province U19	25–23	Blue Bulls U19	Ellis Park Stadium, Johannesburg
	09:30	Try: Jeremy Ward 9', 44'; Mabhutana Peter 65'; Con: Michael Brink 10', 45' (2/3); Pen: Michael Brink 15', 24' (2/3)	Report; Scoreboard	Try: Gavin van den Berg 37'; Tinus de Beer 39'; Con: Tinus de Beer 38', 40' (2/2); Pen: Tinus de Beer 18', 31', 56' (3/4); Drop: Tinus de Beer (0/1)	Referee: Sindile Ngcese

=== Player Record ===
The player record in the 2015 Under-19 Provincial Championship Group A is as follows:

Eastern Province Kings Under-19
Player	FSC	LEO	WPR	BUL	LIO	SHA	SHA	LIO	FSC	LEO	BUL	WPR	SF	F	Sta	Sub	Unu	Pts	Try	Con	Pen	DG	Red card	Temporarily suspended
NJ Oosthuizen	1	1	1	1	3	3	3	3		18 (substituted on)	3	3	3	3	12	1	0	10	2	0	0	0	0	0
Masikane Mazwi	2	2			16	16 (substituted on)	16 (substituted on)	16 (substituted on)	16 (substituted on)	16 (substituted on)	16 (substituted on)	16	16 (substituted on)	16 (substituted on)	2	8	2	0	0	0	0	0	0	0
Roché van Zyl	3	3	3	3					18 (substituted on)	3					5	1	0	0	0	0	0	0	0	0
Rob Lyons	4	4	4	4	4	4	4	4	4	4	4	4	4	4	14	0	0	0	0	0	0	0	0	0
Wihan Coetzer	5	20 (substituted on)	5	19	19	19	20	20 (substituted on)	19 (substituted on)	20 (substituted on)	19 (substituted on)	20	19	19	2	5	7	0	0	0	0	0	0	0
SF Nieuwoudt	6	6	6	6	6	6	6	6	6	6	6	6	6	6	14	0	0	30	6	0	0	0	0	3
Lusanda Badiyana	7	5		5	5	5	5	5	5	5	5	5	5	5	13	0	0	15	3	0	0	0	0	0
Junior Pokomela	8	8	8	8	8	8	8	8	8	8	8	8	8	8	14	0	0	40	8	0	0	0	0	0
James Hall	9	9	9	9	9	9	9	9	9	9	9	9	9	9	14	0	0	44	1	9	7	0	0	1
Garrick Mattheus	10							22 (substituted on)	10		22 (substituted on)	22 (substituted on)	22 (substituted on)	22 (substituted on)	2	5	0	0	0	0	0	0	0	0
Athi Mayinje	11	11	23 (substituted on)	14	14	14	11	11	11	11	11	11	11	11	13	1	0	30	6	0	0	0	0	0
Michael Brink	12		10	12	10	15	10	10	15	10		10	10	10	12	0	0	115	1	22	22	0	0	0
Jeremy Ward	13	12	12		12	12	12	12	12	12	12	12	12	12	13	0	0	34	6	2	0	0	0	0
Yamkela Nyalambisa	14	13	13	13	13	13	13	13	13	13	13	13	13	13	14	0	0	10	2	0	0	0	0	0
Mabhutana Peter	15	15	15	15	15					14	23	14	14	14	9	0	1	20	4	0	0	0	0	0
Tango Balekile	16 (substituted on)	16 (substituted on)	2	16 (substituted on)	2	2	2	2	2	2	2	2	2	2	11	3	0	5	1	0	0	0	0	1
Xandré Vos	17 (substituted on)	17 (substituted on)			17 (substituted on)	17	1	1	1	17 (substituted on)	17 (substituted on)	17	17 (substituted on)	17 (substituted on)	3	7	2	0	0	0	0	0	0	0
Keegan Branford	18	18 (substituted on)													0	1	1	0	0	0	0	0	0	0
Mihlali Mosi	19	19 (substituted on)													0	1	1	0	0	0	0	0	0	0
Hayden Tharratt	20 (substituted on)	7	7	7	7	7	7	7	7	7	7	7	7	7	13	1	0	10	2	0	0	0	0	0
Sibusiso Ngcokovane	21 (substituted on)	21 (substituted on)	21 (substituted on)	21	21		21 (substituted on)	21 (substituted on)	21 (substituted on)			21 (substituted on)		21	0	7	3	0	0	0	0	0	0	0
Avelo Jubase	22 (substituted on)	14	11	11	11	23	23	23 (substituted on)	14	23 (substituted on)					5	3	2	0	0	0	0	0	0	0
Dominik Uytenbogaardt	23 (substituted on)	23 (substituted on)	14	22	23 (substituted on)	11	14	14	23 (substituted on)				23 (substituted on)	23 (substituted on)	4	6	1	5	1	0	0	0	0	0
Jordan Koekemoer		10	22 (substituted on)	10	22	10	22 (substituted on)		22 (substituted on)	22 (substituted on)	10				4	4	1	12	1	2	1	0	0	0
Jacquis Oosthuizen		22 (substituted on)		23											0	1	1	0	0	0	0	0	0	0
Craig Hume			16 (substituted on)	2											1	1	0	0	0	0	0	0	0	0
Matt Howes			17	17 (substituted on)	1	1					18 (substituted on)	18 (substituted on)	18 (substituted on)	18	2	4	2	0	0	0	0	0	0	0
Kuhle Makhoabane			18	18 (substituted on)			18 (substituted on)	18 (substituted on)	3						1	3	1	0	0	0	0	0	0	0
Jason Lizamore			19	20	20	20									0	0	4	0	0	0	0	0	0	0
Pieter Swanepoel			20												0	0	1	0	0	0	0	0	0	0
Mike van Brede					18	18									0	0	2	0	0	0	0	0	0	0
Davron Cameron						21				21 (substituted on)	21 (substituted on)		21 (substituted on)		0	3	1	0	0	0	0	0	0	0
Rivan Lemmer						22									0	0	1	0	0	0	0	0	0	0
Keanu Vers							15	15		15	15	15	15	15	7	0	0	10	2	0	0	0	0	0
Greg Jackson							17 (substituted on)	17 (substituted on)	17 (substituted on)	1	1	1	1	1	5	3	0	0	0	0	0	0	0	0
Xolisa Matshoba							19 (substituted on)	19	20 (substituted on)	19	20 (substituted on)		20	20	0	3	4	0	0	0	0	0	0	0
Austin Fredericks											14				1	0	0	0	0	0	0	0	0	0
Michael de Marco												19 (substituted on)			0	1	0	0	0	0	0	0	0	0
Michael Botha												23 (substituted on)			0	1	0	0	0	0	0	0	0	0
Legend: SF = semi-final, F = final, Sta = Starts, Sub = Substitute appearances, Unu = Unused substitute, Pts = Points, Try = Tries, Con = Conversions, Pen = Penalties, DG = Drop goals, (red card) = Sent off, (yellow card) = Sin-binned. Sage Hayman and Stefan Janse van Vuuren were named in the 2015 Under-19 Provincial Championship Group A, but never included in a matchday 22.

== Varsity Rugby ==
The Eastern Province Kings Rugby Academy is based at the Nelson Mandela Metropolitan University in Port Elizabeth and most of the academy players played Varsity Rugby; either for the NMMU Madibaz in the Varsity Cup or for the NMMU Young Guns in the Under-20 competition.

The following players were included in the Varsity Rugby squads:

NMMU Madibaz – Varsity Cup
Forwards	Laurence Christie • Ivan-John du Preez • Arno Ebersohn • Wynand Grassmann • Rob Louw • Marzuq Maarman • Andisa Ntsila • Philip Odendaal • Brenden Olivier • Tyler Paul • Jody Reyneke • Steven-Floyd Robbeson • Elandré van der Merwe • Dane van der Westhuyzen • CJ Velleman • Warrick Venter • Stephan Zaayman • Did not play: • Cody Basson • Ruben Fourie • Kevin Kaba • Marius le Roux • Sintu Manjezi • Zaine Marx • Tyrone Rankin • Nic Roebeck
Backs	Enrico Acker • Tythan Adams • Ruan Allerston • Eben Barnard • Michael Bernardt • Jarryd Buys • Steven Hansel • Andile Jho • Creswin Joseph • Devon Lailvaux • Ivan Ludick • Khaya Molotana • Yamkela Ngam • Brian Skosana • Did not play: • Aya Dlepu • Luan Nieuwoudt • Juan Smit • Franswa Ueckermann • MC Venter • Lindelwe Zungu
Coach	David Maidza

NMMU – Varsity Cup Young Guns
Forwards	Lusanda Badiyana • Tango Balekile • Ronnie Beyl • Ronnie Beyl • Wihan Coetzer • Wynand Grassmann • Matt Howes • Gerrit Huisamen • Greg Jackson • JP Jamieson • Kuhle Mokhoabane • Qhama Mvimbi • SF Nieuwoudt • Junior Pokomela • Jayson Reinecke • Hayden Tharratt • Elandré van der Merwe • Roché van Zyl • CJ Velleman
Backs	Jason Baggott • Michael Brink • Davron Cameron • James Hall • Martin Keller • Athi Mayinje • Sibusiso Ngcokovane • Luan Nieuwoudt • Dominik Uytenbogaardt • Jeremy Ward • Lindelwe Zungu
Coach	Robbi Kempson

== Youth weeks ==
The Eastern Province Rugby Union announced their squads for the 2015 Under-18 Craven Week, the 2015 Under-18 Academy Week and the 2015 Under-16 Grant Khomo Week tournaments on 20 May 2015:

=== Under-18 Craven Week ===
The 2015 Under-18 Craven Week competition was held between 13 and 18 July 2015 in Stellenbosch. Eastern Province Rugby Union entered two sides – Eastern Province U18 and Eastern Province Country Districts U18.

Eastern Province U18 – Craven Week
Forwards	Michael de Marco • Kamva Dilima • Duan du Plessis • Andre Lategan • Kwezi Mafu • Ruben Pretorius • CJ van Niekerk • Pieter van Taak
Backs	Heino Bezuidenhout • Josiah Boafo • Curwin Bosch • Mohamed Connelly • Sihle Njezulu • Louis Strydom • Riaan van Rensburg
Reserves	Lubabalo Dobela • Arno le Roux • Ruben le Roux • Khanyo Mafunda • Malan Marais • Siwe Masosiwe • Zaci Sandi
Coach	Louis Gerber

Match 1	14 July 2015	Eastern Province U18	41–31	SWD U18	A.F. Markötter Stadium, Stellenbosch
	15:00	Try: Riaan van Rensburg 3'; Khwezi Mafu 17'; Mohamed Connelly 43'; Lubabalo Dobela 48'; Con: Curwin Bosch 17', 44', 49' (3/4); Pen: Curwin Bosch 54', 69' (2/3); Drop: Curwin Bosch 26', 60', 67' (3/4); Cards: Malan Marais (yellow card) 39' to 51'	Report	Try: Luvuyo Ndevu 40'; Manie Libbok 46', 65'; Boeta Hamman 57'; Con: Manie Libbok 41', 47', 58', 66' (4/4); Pen: Manie Libbok 12' (1/3)

Match 2	16 July 2015	Eastern Province U18	23–22	KwaZulu-Natal U18	A.F. Markötter Stadium, Stellenbosch
	15:00	Try: Khwezi Mafu 25'; Heino Bezuidenhout 37'; Con: Curwin Bosch 26', 38' (2/2); Pen: Curwin Bosch 69', 71' (2/2); Drop: Curwin Bosch 32' (1/4); Cards: Malan Marais (yellow card) 53' to 63' (red card) 73'	Report	Try: Marco Palvie 53', 74'; Bader Pretorius 62'; Con: Bader Pretorius 63', 74' (2/3); Pen: Bader Pretorius 16' (1/3); Cards: Victor Foster (yellow card) 23' to 33'; Hendrik Prinsloo (red card) 31'

Match 3	18 July 2015	Western Province U18	95–0	Eastern Province U18	A.F. Markötter Stadium, Stellenbosch
	15:00	Try: Nico Leonard 1', 47'; Jondre Williams 12'; Damian Willemse 21'; Manuel Rass 28', 35', 49'; Ruben de Villiers 37', 65'; Khanya Ncusane 55'; Ryan Muller 58'; Tyreeq February 60', 63'; Leo Kruger 64'; Con: Jondre Williams 1', 13', 22', 29', 35', 48', 50' (7/8); George Lourens 56', 59', 64', 65' (4/6); Pen: Jondre Williams 6' (1/1)	Report

Eastern Province Country Districts U18 – Craven Week
Forwards	Janco Kruger • Janse Roux • Dirk Staats • Pieter Swanepoel • Luyolo Tshongweni • Michael Uys • Mike van Breda • MC van Damme
Backs	Kwezi Ansah • Gevanhier Blom • Anthony Dakin • Athi Halom • Siba Mzanywa • Josie Niewoudt • Zander Stotter
Reserves	Grant Dixie • Wian Ferreira • Jason Liesmore • Thembi Mangwana • Xolile Mdlokovana • Ewan Pieters • Khanyisa Thsuni
Coach	John de Vos

Match 1	14 July 2015	Falcons U18	43–27	Eastern Province Country Districts U18	A.F. Markötter Stadium, Stellenbosch
	10:30	Try: Ntshepe Kokong 18'; Marco Niemandt 21'; Franklin Wagner 27'; Xander Crause 30', 67'; Erich Cronjé 50'; Dylan van der Walt 61'; Con: Xander Crause 19', 22', 31', 62' (4/7)	Report	Try: Xolile Mdlokovana 11', 40'; Gevanhier Blom 34'; Anthony Dakin 38'; Con: Anthony Dakin 35', 39' (2/4); Pen: Anthony Dakin 54' (1/1)

Match 2	16 July 2015	Zimbabwe U18	20–51	Eastern Province Country Districts U18	A.F. Markötter Stadium, Stellenbosch
	10:30	Try: Russel Dinha 5'; Tinotenda Vheriwa 8'; Ernest Mudzengerere 13'; Stuart Marriott-Dodington 21'; Con: Ben Meredith (0/4)	Report	Try: Grant Dixie 15', 68'; Gevanhier Blom 19', 39', 63'; Josie Nieuwoudt 54'; Chulu Chutu 65'; Con: Anthony Dakin 20', 40', 55', 66', 69' (5/7); Pen: Anthony Dakin 26', 54' (2/3); Cards: Herman du Plessis (yellow card) 56' to 66'

Match 3	18 July 2015	Eastern Province Country Districts U18	10–51	Griquas U18	A.F. Markötter Stadium, Stellenbosch
	9:00	Try: Xolile Mdlokovana 56'; Con: Anthony Dakin 57' (1/1); Pen: Anthony Dakin 9' (1/1)	Report	Try: De-An Ackermann 13'; Boan Venter 19'; Rian Kotze 26'; Lihan Viljoen 35'; Jacques Beukes 35', 47'; Janco Cloete 43'; Johan Joubert 45'; Con: Gert Nortjé (0/2); Cameron Huffke 35', 35', 46', 48' (4/6); Pen: Boan Venter 7' (1/1)

=== Under-18 Academy Week ===
The 2015 Under-18 Academy Week competition was held between 6 and 9 July 2015 in Vanderbijlpark. Eastern Province Rugby Union entered two sides – Eastern Province U18 and Eastern Province Country Districts U18.

Eastern Province U18 – Academy Week
Forwards	Tristan Brown • Apiwe Febana • Matthew Lawson • Sisona Makala • Jean Smal • Patrick van Taak • Ancel Velkers • Lwando Zinto
Backs	Emile du Plessis • Nicky Ferreira • Yomelila Keswa • Denver Kleu • Aya Oliphant • Levert Pieterse • Sicole Tole
Reserves	Dylan Barendse • Temba Boltina • Tiaan Coetzee • Ethan Jantjies • Henco Pieterse • Kyle Scott • Donavan Stevens
Coach	Jaco Jansen van Rensburg

Match 1	6 July 2015	Border U18	29–34	Eastern Province U18	Isak Steyl Stadium, Vanderbijlpark
	10:05	Try: Lwazi Mnyute 23', 52'; Jonathan Booysen 42'; Glen Flitoor 44'; Con: Albre Wagener 24', 45', 53' (3/4); Pen: Albre Wagener 11' (1/1)	Report	Try: Levert Pieterse 1', 57'; Emile du Plessis 4'; Denver Kleu 15'; Jean Smal 39'; Con: Denver Kleu 5', 16', 58' (3/5); Pen: Denver Kleu 65' (1/1); Drop: Denver Kleu (0/1)

Match 2	7 July 2015	Western Province U18	53–17	Eastern Province U18	Isak Steyl Stadium, Vanderbijlpark
	14:05	Try: Mujaahid van der Hoven 6'; Charl Serdyn 13'; Lubelo Scott 30'; Lazlo Pschorn 38'; Tristan Leyds 50'; Munier Hartzenberg 53'; Jacobus Swart 64', 70'; Taigh Schoor 68'; Con: Tristan Leyds (0/2); Jordan Chait 39', 54', 65', 68' (4/7); Pen: Jordan Chait (0/1)	Report	Try: Levert Pieterse 44'; Dylan Barendse 62'; Con: Denver Kleu 45', 63' (2/2); Pen: Denver Kleu 27' (1/2)

Match 3	9 July 2015	Pumas U18	31–33	Eastern Province U18	Isak Steyl Stadium, Vanderbijlpark
	12:45	Try: Brandon Parr-Bailey 5'; Nefdt du Toit 25', 53'; Eric Basson 45'; Joseph Beeby 70'; Con: Brandon Parr-Bailey 6', 46' (2/4); Jaco Joubert 55' (1/1); Pen: Brandon Parr-Bailey (0/1)	Report	Try: Donavan Stevens 15'; Denver Kleu 34'; Aya Oliphant 39'; Con: Denver Kleu 16', 34', 40' (3/3); Pen: Denver Kleu 2', 31', 35', 36' (4/5); Drop: Denver Kleu (0/1); Cards: Tristan Brown (yellow card) 24' to 34'

Eastern Province Country Districts U18 – Academy Week
Forwards	Franco Dreyer • Herman du Plessis • Herman Greeff • Renier Pretorius • Dwayne Temango • Lifa Thabaneng • Brian Welman • Bongi Ziya
Backs	Stephan Botes • Chulumanco Chutu • Luciano Douglas • Courtly Kameel • Andre Kritzinger • Khaya Mdingi • Sinethemba Mkaza
Reserves	Yonele Billie • Manona Bulela • JC Conradie • Rivaldo Marima • Dian Odendaal • Gerhard Potgieter • Juan van der Merwe
Coach	Owen Stride

Match 1	6 July 2015	Red Falcons U18	71–7	Eastern Province Country Districts U18	Isak Steyl Stadium, Vanderbijlpark
	16:05	Try: Deam Koch 2', 24'; Musawehkosi Tshabalala 11', 55'; JJ Keyser 19', 51'; Esihle Mbilini 32'; Esuan van Niekerk 35'; Zayvier Hawley 40'; Leturno Petersen 46'; Werner Coetzee 60'; Con: Werner Coetzee 3', 25', 33', 35', 41', 52', 56', 61' (8/11)	Report	Try: Ethan Settler 22'; Con: Luciano Douglas 23' (1/1)

Match 2	7 July 2015	Eastern Province Country Districts U18	40–12	Border Country Districts U18	Isak Steyl Stadium, Vanderbijlpark
	10:05	Try: Curtley Kameel 18'; Tshepiso Thabaneng 22'; Izak Potgieter 26', 63'; Isaac Temengo 32', 56'; Ethan Settler 68'; Con: Izak Potgieter 57' (1/7); Pen: Izak Potgieter 15' (1/1)	Report	Try: Yafika Bovu 4', 9'; Con: Tabiso Stenge (0/1); Litha Nkula 10' (1/1); Drop: Litha Nkula (0/1); Cards: Yafika Bovu (yellow card) 59' to 69'

Match 3	9 July 2015	Eastern Province Country Districts U18	46–29	Leopards U18	Isak Steyl Stadium, Vanderbijlpark
	11:25	Try: Isaac Temengo 4'; Dirk Louw 9'; Yonele Billie 21', 25'; Johannes Greeff 42'; Sinethemba Mkaza 66'; Con: Luciano Douglas 5', 22', 26', 43', 67' (5/6); Pen: Luciano Douglas 49', 54' (2/2)	Report	Try: John-Paul Booysen 13'; Hendric Maree 31'; Tiaan du Toit 37', 52'; Neo Gaaname 65'; Con: Gerhard Fourie 13' (1/1); Tiaan du Toit 31' (1/2); Gerhard Greyling (0/2); Cards: Naledi Khuzwayo (yellow card) 17'

=== Under-16 Grant Khomo Week ===
The 2015 Under-16 Grant Khomo Week competition was held between 6 and 9 July 2015 in Oudtshoorn.

Eastern Province U16 – Grant Khomo Week
Forwards	John-Douglas Allison • Hendrik du Toit • Ruan Jonker • Desmick Kleinbooi • Elandré Smit • Dean van Dyk • Viaan Wolmarans • Philip Wyer-Henderson
Backs	Curtley Deysel • Nevaldo Fleurs • Vaughen Isaacs • Chrispian Jaggers • Ayabonga Matroos • Waqar Solaan • Uan Tait
Reserves	Carl Johnson • Johannes Lombard • Dillon Minaar • Gert Rautenbach • Carl Senyane • Le-Kleu Stokes • Sachin Toring
Coach	Derik Olivier

Match 1	6 July 2015	KwaZulu-Natal U16	22–11	Eastern Province U16	Bridgton Sports Grounds, Oudtshoorn
	10:30	Try: Kamvelihle Fatyela 6'; Malakiwe Zondeki 29'; Morné van Rensburg 41'; JJ van der Mescht 52'; Con: Sanela Nohamba (0/2); Morné van Rensburg 53' (1/2)	Report	Try: Curtley Deysel 26'; Con: Vaughen Isaacs (0/1); Pen: Vaughen Isaacs 9', 50' (2/4)

Match 2	7 July 2015	Eastern Province U16	35–17	Falcons U16	Bridgton Sports Grounds, Oudtshoorn
	14:00	Try: Chrispian Jaggers 8'; Waqar Solaan 17'; Elandré Smit 42'; Le-Kleu Stokes 56'; Ayabonga Matroos 59'; Con: Vaughen Isaacs 9', 18', 43', 58', 59' (5/5); Pen: Vaughen Isaacs (0/2); Cards: Le-Kleu Stokes (yellow card) 21' to 29'	Report	Try: Quan Eymann 23'; Lee-Irwin Andries 33'; Ruben Beytell 48'; Con: Ruben Beytell 24' (1/2); Dwayne Fourie (0/1); Pen: Ruben Beytell (0/1)

Match 3	9 July 2015	Eastern Province U16	34–17	Free State U16	Bridgton Sports Grounds, Oudtshoorn
	10:30	Try: Curtley Deysel 34', 44'; Uan Tait 54'; Elandré Smit 60'; Con: Vaughen Isaacs 35', 45', 55', 61' (4/4); Pen: Vaughen Isaacs 3', 21' (2/3); Cards: Gert Rautenbach (yellow card) 58'	Report	Try: David Kriel 12'; Wyclef Vlitoor 49'; Ru-hann Greyling 59'; Con: Christopher Schreuder 59' (1/3); Cards: Dwayne Arendse (red card) 25'

=== Under-13 Craven Week ===
The 2015 Under-13 Craven Week competition was held between 29 June and 3 July 2014 in White River.

Eastern Province U13 – Craven Week
Forwards	Sino Antonie • Benji Breytenbach • Zander du Preez • Ruan Klasen • Russell Lister • Lubambo Maqutyana • Damon Royle • Hendrik Vermaak
Backs	Larquin Goliath • Aliswa Mapuma • Lathita Nqebe • Nathan Sieberhagen • Daniel Smith • Grant Witbooi • Siviwe Zondani
Reserves	Kuhle Desha • Ethan Liberty • Liyabona Matabiele • Luphomlo Ndiniso • Sisonke Ndoto • Prince Thole • Johan van Biljon
Coach	Ludwe Memese

Match 1	29 June 2015	Eastern Province U13	12–13	Golden Lions U13	Hoërskool Rob Ferreira, White River
	9:30	Try: Lathita Nqebe 18', 43'; Con: Daniel Smith 44' (1/2); Cards: Grant Witbooi (yellow card) 31'	Report	Try: Regardt Fourie 2'; Denis Balt 23'; Con: Heinrich Pieterse (0/1); Regardt Fourie (0/1); Pen: Sebastine Watney 47' (1/1)

Match 2	30 June 2015	Eastern Province U13	17–18	Leopards U13	Hoërskool Rob Ferreira, White River
	11:30	Try: Sino Antonie 22'; Siviwe Zondani 46'; Con: Lathita Nqebe 23', 47' (2/2); Pen: Lathita Nqebe 14' (1/1); Cards: Damon Royle (yellow card) 35' to 40'	Report	Try: Armand Cloete 37', 41'; Theuns Steyn 47'; Con: Theuns Steyn (0/3); Pen: Theuns Steyn 22' (1/1)

Match 3	2 July 2015	Eastern Province U13	31–12	Limpopo Blue Bulls U13	Hoërskool Rob Ferreira, White River
	8:30	Try: Ethan Liberty 14'; Larquin Goliath 22'; Kuhle Desha 24'; Siviwe Zondani 27'; Aliswa Mapuma 36'; Con: Daniel Smith 11', 28' (2/3); Lathita Nqebe 11' (1/2)	Report	Try: Renzo du Plessis 10'; Pieter Vorster 49'; Con: Juan Smith 11' (1/2)

Match 4	3 July 2015	Eastern Province U13	14–38	Blue Bulls U13	Hoërskool Rob Ferreira, White River
	11:00	Try: Larquin Goliath 23'; Ethan Liberty 47'; Con: Daniel Smith 24', 48' (2/2); Pen: Daniel Smith (0/1)	Report	Try: Zandré du Toit 5', 40'; Rolen Visagie 13'; Chris Schoombee 16'; Jooste Nel 25'; Con: Jooste Nel 6', 14', 17', 25', 41' (5/5); Pen: Jooste Nel 20' (1/2)

=== Under-18 LSEN Week ===
The 2015 Under-18 LSEN Week (for Learners with Special Educational Needs) competition was held between 29 June and 2 July 2015 in Worcester.

Match 1	29 June 2015	Eastern Province U18	12–13	SWD U18	HTS Drostdy, Worcester
	9:50		Report

Match 2	30 June 2015	Falcons U18	28–10	Eastern Province U18	HTS Drostdy, Worcester
	8:30		Report

Match 3	2 July 2015	Leopards U18	0–68	Eastern Province U18	HTS Drostdy, Worcester
	10:00		Report

== See also ==
- Eastern Province Elephants
- Southern Kings
- 2015 Vodacom Cup
- 2015 Currie Cup Premier Division
- 2015 Under-21 Provincial Championship Group A
- 2015 Under-19 Provincial Championship Group A
