= 2016 Southern Kings season =

Southern Kings
- 2016 season
- Head coach: Deon Davids
- Captain: Steven Sykes
- Stadium: Nelson Mandela Bay Stadium
- Overall: 17th
- S.A. Group: 7th
- Africa 2 Conference: 4th
- Record: Won 2, Lost 13
- Top try scorer: All: Chris Cloete, Edgar Marutlulle and Steven Sykes (4)
- Top points scorer: All: Louis Fouché (81)
Home colours	Away colours

In 2016, the Southern Kings participated in the 2016 Super Rugby competition, their second appearance in the competition after also playing in 2013. They were included in the Africa 2 Conference of the competition, along with Jaguares, Lions and Sharks.

== Chronological list of events ==
- 17 November 2015: Following the failure of the Eastern Province Kings to pay their players at the end of November 2015, the South African Rugby Union announced that they would take control of the Southern Kings Super Rugby franchise.
- 23 November 2015: SARU announced that an operational implementation task group was set up to oversee the running of the Kings.
- 25 November 2015: SARU announced the details of their operational plan for the Kings; the SWD Eagles head coach Deon Davids was named the head coach of the Southern Kings for the 2016 season, with Mzwandile Stick appointed the back coach, Barend Pieterse the forwards coach and Nadus Nieuwoudt the conditioning coach. In addition, a number of consultant coaches from SARU's mobi-unit could also be utilised throughout the season. It was also revealed that a playing squad of 42 players were planned, which would meet all Strategic Transformation Plan guidelines.
- 13 December 2015: The names of the first 20 players to sign up for the Kings for 2016 were released. The players were Thembelani Bholi, Tom Botha, Aidon Davis, JP du Plessis, Schalk Ferreira, Louis Fouché, Shane Gates, Siyanda Grey, James Hall, Cornell Hess, Malcolm Jaer, Kevin Luiters, Edgar Marutlulle, Tyler Paul, Junior Pokomela, Steven Sykes, CJ Velleman, Stefan Watermeyer, Elgar Watts and Stefan Willemse. Eastern Province CEO Charl Crous was named the Chief Operating Officer of the Southern Kings.
- 4 January 2016: SARU announced that prop Jacobie Adriaanse and lock Schalk Oelofse also joined the Kings for the 2016 Super Rugby season. In addition, Lukhanyo Am, Onke Dubase, Billy Dutton, Leighton Eksteen, Monde Hadebe, Ntando Kebe, Michael Makase, Mihlali Mpafi and Luzuko Vulindlu all joined the training squad on a trial basis.
- 8 January 2016: The Kings announced that loose forward Jacques Engelbrecht, who represented the Kings during the 2013 Super Rugby season, would return for the 2016 season.
- 22 January 2016: The Kings confirmed that Lukhanyo Am, JC Astle, Chris Cloete, Leighton Eksteen, Martin Ferreira, Tazz Fuzani and Luzuko Vulindlu all joined the Kings for 2016.
- 25 January 2016: Three more players were confirmed for the Kings for 2016 – hooker Martin Bezuidenhout, lock Philip du Preez and fullback Jurgen Visser. Another fullback, Jaco van Tonder joined on a trial period.

== Personnel ==
=== Coaches and management ===
The Kings coaching and management staff for the 2016 Super Rugby season are:

2016 Kings coaches and management
Position	Name
Head coach	Deon Davids
Forwards coach	Barend Pieterse
Backs coach	Mzwandile Stick
Conditioning coach	Nadus Nieuwoudt
Doctor	Dr Conrad van Hagen
Physiotherapist	Kim Naidoo
Team manager	Zingi Hela

=== Squad ===
The following players were named in the Kings squad for the 2016 Super Rugby season:

2016 Kings squad
Player	Union	Position/s	Date of birth (age)	Super Rugby		Kings	
Player	Union	Position/s	Date of birth (age)	Apps	Pts	Apps	Pts
(South Africa) Justin Ackerman	Golden Lions	Prop	17 March 1992 (aged 23)	–	–	–	–
(South Africa) Jacobie Adriaanse	To be confirmed	Prop	19 July 1985 (aged 30)	13	0	–	–
(South Africa) Louis Albertse	Eastern Province Kings	Prop	2 April 1990 (aged 25)	–	–	–	–
(South Africa) Lukhanyo Am	Sharks	Centre	28 November 1993 (aged 22)	–	–	–	–
(South Africa) JC Astle	Sharks	Lock	30 August 1990 (aged 25)	–	–	–	–
(South Africa) Martin Bezuidenhout	Eastern Province Kings	Hooker	21 August 1989 (aged 26)	34	15	–	–
(South Africa) Thembelani Bholi	Eastern Province Kings	Flanker	18 January 1990 (aged 26)	–	–	–	–
(South Africa) Tom Botha	Eastern Province Kings	Prop	31 August 1990 (aged 25)	–	–	–	–
(South Africa) Chris Cloete	Pumas	Flanker	15 February 1991 (aged 25)	–	–	–	–
(South Africa) Aidon Davis	Eastern Province Kings	Number eight	29 April 1994 (aged 21)	1	0	1	0
(South Africa) JP du Plessis	Eastern Province Kings	Centre	29 April 1991 (aged 24)	3	0	–	–
(South Africa) Philip du Preez	Eastern Province Kings	Lock	1 August 1993 (aged 22)	–	–	–	–
(South Africa) Leighton Eksteen	SWD Eagles	Fullback	15 September 1994 (aged 21)	–	–	–	–
(South Africa) Jacques Engelbrecht	To be confirmed	Number eight	10 June 1985 (aged 30)	28	5	15	5
(South Africa) Martin Ferreira	Eastern Province Kings	Hooker	24 January 1989 (aged 27)	–	–	–	–
(South Africa) Schalk Ferreira	Eastern Province Kings	Prop	9 February 1984 (aged 32)	31	5	15	5
(South Africa) Louis Fouché	Eastern Province Kings	Fly-half	4 January 1990 (aged 26)	23	47	–	–
(South Africa) Tazz Fuzani	Eastern Province Kings	Lock	18 January 1991 (aged 25)	–	–	–	–
(South Africa) Shane Gates	Eastern Province Kings	Centre	27 September 1992 (aged 23)	5	0	5	0
(South Africa) Siyanda Grey	Eastern Province Kings	Winger	16 August 1989 (aged 26)	4	0	4	0
(South Africa) James Hall	Eastern Province Kings	Scrum-half	2 January 1996 (aged 20)	–	–	–	–
(South Africa) Liam Hendricks	Western Province	Prop	31 May 1994 (aged 21)	–	–	–	–
(South Africa) Cornell Hess	Eastern Province Kings	Lock	1 March 1989 (aged 26)	–	–	–	–
(South Africa) Dewald Human	Blue Bulls	Fly-half / Fullback	19 May 1995 (aged 20)	–	–	–	–
(South Africa) Malcolm Jaer	Eastern Province Kings	Fullback	29 June 1995 (aged 20)	–	–	–	–
(South Africa) JP Jonck	Eastern Province Kings	Flanker	7 December 1991 (aged 24)	–	–	–	–
(South Africa) Ntando Kebe	Border Bulldogs	Scrum-half	19 August 1988 (aged 27)	–	–	–	–
(Namibia) Theuns Kotzé	Boland Cavaliers	Fly-half	16 July 1987 (aged 28)	–	–	–	–
(South Africa) Kevin Luiters	Eastern Province Kings	Scrum-half	2 July 1992 (aged 23)	–	–	–	–
(South Africa) Sintu Manjezi	Eastern Province Kings	Lock / Flanker	7 April 1995 (aged 20)	–	–	–	–
(South Africa) Edgar Marutlulle	Eastern Province Kings	Hooker	20 December 1987 (aged 28)	12	0	4	0
(South Africa) Wandile Mjekevu	Sharks	Winger	7 January 1991 (aged 25)	10	20	–	–
(South Africa) Andisa Ntsila	SWD Eagles	Flanker	7 November 1993 (aged 22)	–	–	–	–
(South Africa) Schalk Oelofse	SWD Eagles	Lock	2 November 1988 (aged 27)	–	–	–	–
(South Africa) Tyler Paul	Eastern Province Kings	Lock / Flanker	20 January 1995 (aged 21)	–	–	–	–
(South Africa) Junior Pokomela	Eastern Province Kings	Number eight	10 December 1996 (aged 19)	–	–	–	–
(South Africa) Charles Radebe	SWD Eagles	Winger	16 December 1995 (aged 20)	–	–	–	–
(South Africa) Sti Sithole	Western Province	Prop	31 March 1993 (aged 22)	3	0	–	–
(South Africa) Vukile Sofisa	Eastern Province Kings	Prop	6 April 1993 (aged 22)	–	–	–	–
(South Africa) Steven Sykes	Eastern Province Kings	Lock	5 August 1984 (aged 31)	96	55	13	5
(South Africa) Jaco van Tonder	Sharks	Fullback	7 April 1991 (aged 24)	3	–	–	–
(South Africa) CJ Velleman	Eastern Province Kings	Flanker	24 February 1995 (aged 20)	–	–	–	–
(South Africa) Jurgen Visser	Eastern Province Kings	Fullback	13 September 1989 (aged 26)	31	13	–	–
(South Africa) Luzuko Vulindlu	SWD Eagles	Centre / Winger	14 November 1987 (aged 28)	9	5	–	–
(South Africa) Jeremy Ward	Eastern Province Kings	Centre	10 January 1996 (aged 20)	–	–	–	–
(South Africa) Stefan Watermeyer	Eastern Province Kings	Centre	3 June 1988 (aged 27)	14	10	–	–
(South Africa) Elgar Watts	Eastern Province Kings	Fly-half	24 September 1985 (aged 30)	19	87	–	–
(South Africa) Stefan Willemse	Eastern Province Kings	Flanker	12 April 1992 (aged 23)	–	–	–	–
Note: Players' ages and statistics are correct as of 27 February 2016, the date of the opening round of the competition. Appearances and points refer to the Super Rugby competition only and excludes the 2013 relegation play-off series against the Lions.

== Log ==
2016 Super Rugby standings
Pos	Team	Pld	W	D	L	PF	PA	PD	TF	TA	TB	LB	Pts	Qualification
1	Hurricanes (C)	15	11	0	4	458	314	+144	61	37	7	2	53	Quarter-finals (Conference leaders)
2	Lions	15	11	0	4	535	349	+186	71	42	7	1	52	Quarter-finals (Conference leaders)
3	Stormers	15	10	1	4	440	274	+166	49	28	5	4	51	Quarter-finals (Conference leaders)
4	Brumbies	15	10	0	5	425	326	+99	56	40	3	0	43	Quarter-finals (Conference leaders)
5	Highlanders	15	11	0	4	422	273	+149	50	28	4	4	52	Quarter-finals (Wildcard)
6	Chiefs	15	11	0	4	491	341	+150	68	39	6	1	51	Quarter-finals (Wildcard)
7	Crusaders	15	11	0	4	487	317	+170	65	40	5	1	50	Quarter-finals (Wildcard)
8	Sharks	15	9	1	5	360	269	+91	40	30	2	3	43	Quarter-finals (Wildcard)
9	Bulls	15	9	1	5	399	339	+60	47	37	4	0	42	
10	Waratahs	15	8	0	7	413	317	+96	55	37	4	4	40	
11	Blues	15	8	1	6	374	380	−6	45	47	2	3	39	
12	Rebels	15	7	0	8	365	486	−121	46	65	2	1	31	
13	Jaguares	15	4	0	11	376	427	−51	44	51	1	5	22	
14	Cheetahs	15	4	0	11	377	425	−48	47	48	1	4	21	
15	Reds	15	3	1	11	290	458	−168	33	57	0	3	17	
16	Force	15	2	0	13	260	441	−181	25	60	0	5	13	
17	Southern Kings	15	2	0	13	282	684	−402	34	95	1	0	9	
18	Sunwolves	15	1	1	13	293	627	−334	33	88	0	3	9	

== Matches ==
The Kings will play the following matches during the 2016 Super Rugby season:

27 February 2016	Southern Kings	8–43	Sharks	Nelson Mandela Bay Stadium, Port Elizabeth
15:05	Try: Chris Cloete 9'; Con: Elgar Watts (0/1); Pen: Elgar Watts 28' (1/2); Jurgen Visser (0/1)	Report; Scoreboard	Try: Odwa Ndungane 17', 77'; Jean-Luc du Preez 31'; Willie le Roux 42'; Paul Jordaan 47'; Lwazi Mvovo 59'; Con: Joe Pietersen 32', 43', 48', 60', 78' (5/6); Pen: Joe Pietersen 14' (1/1); Drop: Joe Pietersen (0/1)	Attendance: 10,937; Referee: Jaco van Heerden

12 March 2016	Southern Kings	24–58	Chiefs	Nelson Mandela Bay Stadium, Port Elizabeth
15:05	Try: Edgar Marutlulle 40', 52'; Con: Louis Fouché 53' (1/2); Pen: Louis Fouché 3', 16', 25', 27' (4/4); Cards: Martin Bezuidenhout (yellow card) 68' to 79'	Report; Scoreboard	Try: Sam Cane 21', 61'; Damian McKenzie 32'; Taleni Seu 36'; Charlie Ngatai 43'; Aaron Cruden 46'; Glen Fisiiahi 69'; Con: Damian McKenzie 22', 33', 37', 44', 47', 62', 70' (7/7); Pen: Damian McKenzie 12', 31', 84' (3/3)	Attendance: 7,768; Referee: Jaco van Heerden

19 March 2016	Crusaders	57–24	Southern Kings	AMI Stadium, Christchurch
19:35	Try: Nemani Nadolo 15', 32'; Johnny McNicholl 18'; Ben Funnell 22'; Richie Mo'unga 45'; Mitchell Drummond 49'; Jone Macilai-Tori 61'; Pete Samu 78'; Con: Richie Mo'unga 16', 19', 33', 46' (4/5); Ben Volavola 50', 62', 79' (3/3); Pen: Richie Mo'unga 26' (1/1); David Havili (0/1)	Report; Scoreboard	Try: Luzuko Vulindlu 12'; Edgar Marutlulle 51'; Chris Cloete 66'; Con: Louis Fouché 13', 52', 67' (3/3); Pen: Louis Fouché 8' (1/2); Cards: Chris Cloete (yellow card) 75'	Attendance: 10,100; Referee: Will Houston

25 March 2016	Hurricanes	42–20	Southern Kings	Westpac Stadium, Wellington
19:35	Try: Ngani Laumape 5'; Blade Thomson 13'; Ardie Savea 27'; Vince Aso 73'; Beauden Barrett 80'; Con: Beauden Barrett 14', 28', 74', 81' (4/5); Pen: Beauden Barrett 54', 58', 69' (3/4)	Report; Scoreboard	Try: Steven Sykes 30'; Louis Fouché 40'; Con: Louis Fouché 31', 40' (2/2); Pen: Louis Fouché 10', 61' (2/3)	Attendance: 15,386; Referee: Brendon Pickerill

2 April 2016	Southern Kings	33–28	Sunwolves	Nelson Mandela Bay Stadium, Port Elizabeth
17:05	Try: Steven Sykes 3'; Malcolm Jaer 17'; Shane Gates 33'; Elgar Watts 79'; Con: Louis Fouché 4', 79' (2/4); Pen: Louis Fouché 8', 30', 60' (3/3)	Report; Scoreboard	Try: Shota Horie 23'; Tusi Pisi 25'; Tim Bond 39'; Akihito Yamada 80'; Con: Tusi Pisi 24' (1/4); Pen: Tusi Pisi 10', 55' (2/2)	Attendance: 5,437; Referee: Rasta Rasivhenge

9 April 2016	Southern Kings	6–38	Bulls	Nelson Mandela Bay Stadium, Port Elizabeth
19:15	Pen: Louis Fouché 13', 37' (2/2)	Report; Scoreboard	Try: Jan Serfontein 16'; Jamba Ulengo 21', 48'; SP Marais 28', 74'; RG Snyman 63'; Con: Tian Schoeman 29', 49', 64' (3/5); Francois Brummer 75' (1/1); Cards: RG Snyman (yellow card) 40' to 46'; Marcel van der Merwe (yellow card) 40' to 50'	Referee: Shuhei Kubo

23 April 2016	Southern Kings	10–45	Lions	Nelson Mandela Bay Stadium, Port Elizabeth
17:10	Try: Luzuko Vulindlu 30'; Chris Cloete 54'; Con: Louis Fouché (0/2); Pen: Louis Fouché (0/2); Cards: Thembelani Bholi (yellow card) 37' to 47'	Report; Scoreboard	Try: Warren Whiteley 22'; Courtnall Skosan 34'; Akker van der Merwe 38'; Ruan Combrinck 42', 57'; Corné Fourie 45'; Rohan Janse van Rensburg 70'; Con: Elton Jantjies 23', 35', 39', 43', 71' (5/7); Pen: Elton Jantjies (0/1)	Referee: Rasta Rasivhenge

30 April 2016	Jaguares	73–27	Southern Kings	José Amalfitani Stadium, Buenos Aires
18:40	Try: Juan Martín Hernández 2'; Santiago Cordero 9'; Leonardo Senatore 15', 63', 70'; Nicolás Sánchez 19'; Agustín Creevy 31'; Manuel Montero 38'; Matías Alemanno 42'; Emiliano Boffelli 50'; Martín Landajo 54'; Con: Nicolás Sánchez 3', 10', 16', 20', 39', 43', 51', 55', 64' (9/11)	Report; Scoreboard	Try: Chris Cloete 26'; Stefan Watermeyer 40'; Thembelani Bholi 47'; Steven Sykes 79'; Con: Elgar Watts 40', 48' (2/3); Louis Fouché (0/1); Pen: Elgar Watts 7' (1/1); Cards: Luzuko Vulindlu (yellow card) 41'	Referee: Stuart Berry

7 May 2016	Southern Kings	18–34	Blues	Nelson Mandela Bay Stadium, Port Elizabeth
17:10	Try: James Hall 14'; Edgar Marutlulle 54'; Con: Elgar Watts 15' (1/2); Pen: Elgar Watts 4' (1/1); Jurgen Visser 60' (1/1)	Report; Scoreboard	Try: James Parsons 9'; Melani Nanai 25', 29'; Billy Guyton 70'; Tevita Li 85'; Con: Ihaia West 26', 30', 70' (3/4); Matt McGahan (0/1); Pen: Ihaia West 43' (1/1)	Referee: Federico Anselmi

14 May 2016	Cheetahs	34–20	Southern Kings	Free State Stadium, Bloemfontein
17:05	Try: Raymond Rhule 23'; Uzair Cassiem 28'; Michael van der Spuy 45'; Sergeal Petersen 56'; Con: Fred Zeilinga 24', 29', 46', 57' (4/4); Pen: Fred Zeilinga 19', 48' (2/2); Cards: Paul Schoeman (yellow card) 78'	Report; Scoreboard	Try: JP du Plessis 50'; Lukhanyo Am 72'; Con: Louis Fouché 51', 73' (2/2); Pen: Elgar Watts 14', 31' (2/2)	Referee: Federico Anselmi

21 May 2016	Sharks	53–0	Southern Kings	Kings Park Stadium, Durban
17:10	Try: Patrick Lambie 8', 49'; Paul Jordaan 19', 24'; Willie le Roux 22'; André Esterhuizen 33'; JP Pietersen 38'; Thomas du Toit 77'; Con: Patrick Lambie 20', 23', 25', 34', 39' (5/8); Pen: Patrick Lambie 14' (1/1)	Report; Scoreboard		Referee: Quinton Immelman

27 May 2016	Southern Kings	29–22	Jaguares	Nelson Mandela Bay Stadium, Port Elizabeth
19:00	Try: Schalk Ferreira 58' penalty try 72'; Dewald Human 74'; Wandile Mjekevu 77'; Con: Louis Fouché 59', 72', 75' (3/4); Pen: Louis Fouché 2' (1/2)	Report; Scoreboard	Try: Facundo Isa 63'; Con: Nicolás Sánchez 64' (1/1); Pen: Nicolás Sánchez 17', 34', 42', 47', 52' (5/5); Drop: Nicolás Sánchez (0/1); Juan Martín Hernández (0/1); Cards: Tomás Lavanini (red card) 26'; Ramiro Herrera (red card) 38'; Tomás Lezana (yellow card) 70'	Referee: Nick Briant

2 July 2016	Southern Kings	18–48	Highlanders	Nelson Mandela Bay Stadium, Port Elizabeth
17:20	Try: Wandile Mjekevu 39'; Steven Sykes 63'; Con: Elgar Watts (0/1); Louis Fouché 64' (1/1); Pen: Elgar Watts 27' (1/2); Louis Fouché 58' (1/1); Cards: Shane Gates (yellow card) 17' to 27'	Report; Scoreboard	Try: Matt Faddes 23', 46', 79'; Dan Pryor 55'; Jack Wilson 69'; Patrick Osborne 76'; Aki Seiuli 81'; Con: Lima Sopoaga 24', 71', 77', 80' (4/6); Fletcher Smith 82' (1/1); Pen: Lima Sopoaga 14' (1/1)	Referee: Marius van der Westhuizen

8 July 2016	Lions	57–21	Southern Kings	Ellis Park Stadium, Johannesburg
19:00	Try: Rohan Janse van Rensburg 2', 68'; Andries Coetzee 33'; Faf de Klerk 48'; Franco Mostert 57'; Malcolm Marx 64'; Sylvian Mahuza 72'; Courtnall Skosan 78'; Con: Elton Jantjies 3', 33', 48', 58', 65' (5/5); Ruan Combrinck 69', 73' (2/3); Pen: Elton Jantjies 31' (1/1)	Report; Scoreboard	Try: James Hall 14'; Stefan Watermeyer 53'; Schalk Ferreira 82'; Con: Louis Fouché 15', 54', 83' (3/3); Pen: Louis Fouché (0/1); Cards: Shane Gates (yellow card) 56' to 67'; Edgar Marutlulle (yellow card) 61' to 71'	Referee: Jaco van Heerden

16 July 2016	Stormers	52–24	Southern Kings	DHL Newlands, Cape Town
17:05	Try: Huw Jones 1', 15', 46', 79'; Leolin Zas 27', 60', 67'; Brandon Thomson 69'; Con: Jean-Luc du Plessis 2', 16', 28' (3/3); Brandon Thomson 68', 70', 80' (3/5); Cards: Louis Schreuder (yellow card) 32' to 42'	Report; Scoreboard	Try: Malcolm Jaer 38'; Wandile Mjekevu 77'; Stefan Watermeyer 82'; Con: Dewald Human 39' (1/1); Elgar Watts 78' (1/1); Stefan Watermeyer 83' (1/1); Pen: Dewald Human 21' (1/1)	Referee: Jaco Peyper

== Player statistics ==
The Super Rugby appearance record for players that represented the Kings in 2016 is as follows:

2016 Southern Kings player statistics
Player name	SHA	CHI	CRU	HUR	SUN	BUL	LIO	JAG	BLU	CHE	SHA	JAG	HIG	LIO	STO	App	Try	Kck	Pts
Schalk Ferreira	1	1	1		17 (substituted on)	17 (substituted on)	1	1			1	1	1	17 (substituted on)	17 (substituted on)	12	2	0	10
Martin Ferreira	2		2		16 (substituted on)	16 (substituted on)	2	16 (substituted on)	16 (substituted on)	16 (substituted on)	2					9	0	0	0
Tom Botha	3	18 (substituted on)	18 (substituted on)	18 (substituted on)	18 (substituted on)	3	18 (substituted on)	3	3	3	18 (substituted on)	18 (substituted on)	3	18 (substituted on)	18 (substituted on)	15	0	0	0
Steven Sykes	4	4	4	4	4	4	4	4	4		4	4	4		4	13	4	0	20
JC Astle	5	5	5	5	5	5	19 (substituted on)	5	5	5	19 (substituted on)	5	5	5	5	15	0	0	0
Chris Cloete	6	6	6	20 (substituted on)	20 (substituted on)	6	6	6	6							9	4	0	20
Thembelani Bholi	7	7	7				7	7	7	7	7	6				9	1	0	5
Jacques Engelbrecht	8	8	8	8			20 (substituted on)				20 (substituted on)	20 (substituted on)	20 (substituted on)	20 (substituted on)	8	10	0	0	0
Ntando Kebe	9	9	21 (substituted on)	9	9	21 (substituted on)	21 (substituted on)	9	21 (substituted on)	21 (substituted on)	9	9	9			13	0	0	0
Elgar Watts	10	22 (substituted on)	22 (substituted on)	22 (substituted on)	22 (substituted on)			10	10	10	22 (substituted on)		10		22 (substituted on)	11	1	26	31
Malcolm Jaer	11	11	11	11	11	11	15						15	15	15	10	2	0	10
Shane Gates	12	12	12	12	12		12	12	12	12	12	12	12	12	12	14	1	0	5
JP du Plessis	13		23 (substituted on)	23 (substituted on)		22 (substituted on)	11			13	13	23 (substituted on)				8	1	0	5
Luzuko Vulindlu	14	14	14	14		14	14	11	11	11	11		23 (substituted on)			11	2	0	10
Jurgen Visser	15	15	15	15	15	15			15	15	15	15				10	0	3	3
Edgar Marutlulle	16 (substituted on)	2	16 (substituted on)	2	2	2		2	2	2		2	2	2	2	13	4	0	20
Sti Sithole	17 (substituted on)	17 (substituted on)	17 (substituted on)	1	1	1			1				17 (substituted on)	1	1	10	0	0	0
Louis Albertse	18 (substituted on)									17 (substituted on)						2	0	0	0
Schalk Oelofse	19 (substituted on)	19 (substituted on)	19 (substituted on)	19 (substituted on)	19 (substituted on)	19 (substituted on)	5		19 (substituted on)	4	5	19 (substituted on)	19 (substituted on)	4		13	0	0	0
CJ Velleman	20 (substituted on)	20 (substituted on)	20 (substituted on)	6	6	20 (substituted on)	8	8	8				6			10	0	0	0
Leighton Eksteen	21 (substituted on)						23 (substituted on)	23 (substituted on)	23 (substituted on)	23 (substituted on)						5	0	0	0
Louis Fouché	22 (substituted on)	10	10	10	10	10	10	22 (substituted on)	22 (substituted on)	22 (substituted on)	10	10	22 (substituted on)	10		14	1	76	81
Charles Radebe	23 (substituted on)															1	0	0	0
Jacobie Adriaanse		3	3	3	3		3	18 (substituted on)	18 (substituted on)	18 (substituted on)	3	3		3	3	12	0	0	0
Stefan Watermeyer		13	13	13	13	12	22 (substituted on)	13	13			13	13	13	13	12	3	2	17
Martin Bezuidenhout		16 (substituted on)		16 (substituted on)			16 (substituted on)				16 (substituted on)	16	16 (substituted on)	16 (substituted on)	16 (substituted on)	7	0	0	0
Kevin Luiters		21 (substituted on)	9	21 (substituted on)	21 (substituted on)						21 (substituted on)	21	21 (substituted on)	21 (substituted on)	21 (substituted on)	8	0	0	0
Jaco van Tonder		23 (substituted on)			23 (substituted on)	23 (substituted on)		15			23 (substituted on)					5	0	0	0
Stefan Willemse				7	7	7		19 (substituted on)	20 (substituted on)	20 (substituted on)	6	7	7	7	7	11	0	0	0
Justin Ackerman				17 (substituted on)		18 (substituted on)	17 (substituted on)	17 (substituted on)	17 (substituted on)		17 (substituted on)	17 (substituted on)	18 (substituted on)			8	0	0	0
Aidon Davis					8	8		20 (substituted on)		8	8	8	8	8	20 (substituted on)	9	0	0	0
Siyanda Grey					14											1	0	0	0
James Hall						9	9	21 (substituted on)	9	9				9	9	7	2	0	10
Lukhanyo Am						13	13	14	14	14	14	14	14	14	14	10	1	0	5
Liam Hendricks										1						1	0	0	0
JP Jonck										6						1	0	0	0
Cornell Hess										19 (substituted on)						1	0	0	0
Wandile Mjekevu												11	11	11	11	4	3	0	15
Dewald Human												22 (substituted on)		22 (substituted on)	10	3	1	5	10
Andisa Ntsila														6	6	2	0	0	0
Sintu Manjezi														19 (substituted on)	19 (substituted on)	2	0	0	0
Jeremy Ward														23 (substituted on)	23 (substituted on)	2	0	0	0
penalty try																–	1	–	5
Total																15	34	112	282

== See also ==
- Southern Kings
- 2016 Super Rugby season
