= Brent Janse van Rensburg =

- Born: 6 August 1980 (age 46)
- School: Westering High School, Port Elizabeth

Rugby union career
- Current team: Pumas
Coaching career
- Years: Team
- 2001–2007: South African Rugby Institute
- 2007–2008: Queen's College (professional coach)
- 2008–2009: Border Under-18 (head coach)
- 2008–2009: Border Bulldogs (technical adviser)
- 2009–2010: Rugby Performance Centre (head coach)
- 2011–2013: NMMU Madibaz (head coach)
- 2012–2013: South African Universities (assistant coach)
- 2014: Grey High School (director of rugby)
- 2015: Golden Lions (high performance coach)
- 2015: Eastern Province Kings (defence coach)
- 2015: Eastern Province Kings (head coach)
- 2016: Boland Cavaliers (head coach)
- 2017–2018: Pumas (head coach)
- 2019–2021: Griquas (head coach)
- 2021–: Bath (defence coach)

Brent Janse van Rensburg (born 6 August 1980) is a South African rugby union coach, currently the defence coach for Bath Rugby in the English Premiership.

== Career ==
He started his career at the South African Rugby Institute in Stellenbosch, also coaching at Paul Roos Gymnasium, before moving to Queenstown to become the Head of Rugby at Queen's College. He coached Border's Craven Week team for two years – winning eight of his nine matches in charge of the side – before also getting involved with the Border Bulldogs Currie Cup and Vodacom Cup teams. He became Technical Director and head coach at Alan Zondagh's Rugby Performance Centre in Riebeek Valley.

He was appointed as the head coach of Varsity Cup side NMMU Madibaz prior to the 2011 Varsity Cup season, where he remained for three seasons. Having finished in the bottom two of the Varsity Cup before his arrival, Janse van Rensburg guided them to fifth spot in 2012 and went one better in 2013, helping them reach the semi-finals of the competition for the first time in their history. His coaching of the team also led to him being named an assistant coach for the South African Universities team in the same season.

After the 2013 season, Janse van Rensburg was replaced as head coach by David Maidza, but remained involved with NMMU in a consulting capacity.

At the start of 2014, Janse van Rensburg was appointed as the Director of Rugby at Grey High School.

He moved to Johannesburg to join the Golden Lions at the start of 2015 as Golden Lions U19 forwards coach and High Performance Coach of the union, but returned to Port Elizabeth just over a month later to become the head defense coach for the Eastern Province Kings.

In June 2015, Janse van Rensburg was appointed as the head coach for the EP Kings for the 2015 Currie Cup Premier Division campaign.

He was also initially appointed as the head coach of the Southern Kings Super Rugby side for 2016, but resigned from the role in December 2015.

On 14 December 2021 Bath Rugby announced that he would be joining the club as defence coach until the end of the 2021/22 season.
