= Simon Kerrod =

South African rugby union player

- Full name: Simon Kerrod
- Born: 25 August 1992 (age 34)
- Height: 182 cm (6 ft 0 in)
- Weight: 121 kg (19 st 1 lb; 267 lb)
- School: Pretoria Boys High School

Rugby union career
- Position: Tighthead Prop
- Current team: Harlequins
Youth career
- 2011–2012: Sharks
Amateur team(s)
Years	Team	Apps	(Points)
2013	College Rovers		
2014	NMMU Madibaz	6	(0)
Senior career
Years	Team	Apps	(Points)
2013	Sharks (Currie Cup)	2	(0)
2014–2015	Eastern Province Kings	20	(20)
2014	→ Border Bulldogs	1	(0)
2016–2017	Jersey Reds	35	(25)
2017–2019	Worcester Warriors	26	(5)
2019–present	Harlequins	122	
- Correct as of 26 August 2025
International career
Years	Team	Apps	(Points)
2013	South African Barbarians	1	(0)
- Correct as of 26 August 2025

Simon Kerrod (born 25 August 1992) is a South African rugby union player, currently playing with English Premiership side Harlequins. His regular position is tighthead prop.

== Club career ==
He represented the Sharks Under-19 team in 2011 and their Under-21 team in 2012.

He was included in the senior squad for the 2013 Vodacom Cup competition and debuted against Argentine side Pampas XV.

Later that year, he was included in a South African Barbarians team to face Saracens in London.

He also represented College Rovers in the 2013 SARU Community Cup tournament.

He joined the Eastern Province Kings for 2014. He was selected on the bench for the Eastern Province Kings side to face Wales during a tour match during a 2014 incoming tour. He came on as a substitute for the injured Charl du Plessis shortly before halftime as the Kings suffered a 12–34 defeat. However, Kerrod got his first points in a Kings shirt as he scored a try with a minute to go in the match. He also scored a try in his first match for them in the 2015 Vodacom Cup, helping the side to a 27–17 victory over Eastern Cape rivals the Border Bulldogs in East London.

He joined English the RFU Championship side of Jersey in January 2016. On 21 February 2017, Kerrod makes a move to the Aviva Premiership with Worcester Warriors from the 2017-18 season. On 21 March 2019, Kerrod signed for Premiership rivals Harlequins from the 2019-20 season.

== International career ==
In October 2020 Kerrod was called up to a senior England training squad by head coach Eddie Jones.
