= Tim Whitehead (rugby union) =

South African rugby union player

- Full name: Timothy John Whitehead
- Born: 30 May 1988 (age 38) Port Elizabeth, South Africa
- Height: 1.88 m (6 ft 2 in)
- Weight: 90 kg (200 lb; 14 st 2 lb)
- School: Grey High School, Port Elizabeth
- University: University of Cape Town

Rugby union career
- Position: Centre
Youth career
- 2008–2009: Western Province
Amateur team(s)
Years	Team	Apps	(Points)
2008	UCT Ikey Tigers	11	(20)
Senior career
Years	Team	Apps	(Points)
2010–2011	Western Province	23	(10)
2010	Stormers	10	(0)
2012	Sharks	15	(5)
2012–2014	Sharks (Currie Cup)	14	(5)
2014–2015	Eastern Province Kings	19	(35)
2016	Western Province	10	(15)
2010–2016	Total	91	(70)
- Correct as of 23 July 2016
International career
Years	Team	Apps	(Points)
2009	South Africa Students	2	(5)
- Correct as of 26 March 2014

Timothy John Whitehead (born 30 May 1988) is a South African professional rugby union player who most recently played with Western Province. His regular position is centre.

== Career ==
=== Youth and Varsity Cup rugby ===
Whitehead played for Varsity Cup side UCT Ikey Tigers in the 2008, 2010, 2011 editions of the competition. He made eleven appearances in this competition during the three seasons, helping Ikeys win the title in 2011 by beating UP Tuks in Pretoria.

He also played for the Western Province U21 side in the Under-21 Currie Cup competitions in 2008 and 2009.

=== Western Province / Stormers ===
His first class debut came in the 2010 Vodacom Cup competition when he came on as a substitute for Western Province in their match against the Boland Cavaliers in Bredasdorp. His first start came a week later in their home match against the Sharks XV.

After one more start in the Vodacom Cup that season, Whitehead was drafted into the Stormers squad for the 2010 Super 14 season. He made his Super Rugby debut on 20 March 2010 against the Cheetahs in Cape Town. He made a further two starts and seven substitute appearances during the remainder of the season.

He also made his debut in the Currie Cup in the same season. He started against the Free State Cheetahs, one of six matches he started that season.

He fell out of Super Rugby contention in 2011, but made another six appearances in the 2011 Vodacom Cup competition and seven in the 2011 Currie Cup Premier Division.

=== Sharks / Sharks ===
At the end of 2011, Whitehead moved to Durban to join the Sharks. He started fifteen of the Sharks' matches during the 2012 Super Rugby season – also scoring his first Super Rugby try against the Blues in Auckland – and a further seven appearances in the 2012 Currie Cup Premier Division.

Whitehead missed the entire 2013 Super Rugby season with a broken arm sustained in a pre-season match against the Leopards, but returned in the latter half of the year to help the Sharks win the 2013 Currie Cup Premier Division.

With new head coach Jake White taking over at the Sharks, Whitehead was a surprise omission from the squad for the 2014 Super Rugby season, being relegated to the Vodacom Cup squad instead.

=== Eastern Province Kings ===
He joined Port Elizabeth-based side Eastern Province Kings prior to the 2014 Currie Cup Premier Division season. He left after two seasons at the Kings, after the non-payment of player salaries allowed him to disengage himself from his contract.
