= Westering High School =

Location
- Papenkuils Street, Westering; Port Elizabeth, Eastern Cape; South Africa
- Coordinates: 33°55′56.44″S 25°31′39.21″E

Information
- Type: Public high school
- Motto: OPTIMA PETAMUS
- Established: 1970; 56 years ago
- School district: District 9
- School number: 041 360 7805
- Headmaster: Stuart Hayward
- Staff: 45 full-time
- Grades: 8–12
- Gender: Boys & Girls
- Enrollment: 980 pupils (2009)
- Education system: FET
- Language: English
- Schedule: 07:40 - 14:15
- Houses: Pringle - Gush - Shaw - Matthews
- Colours: Blue; Gold; White
- Rival: Alexander Road High School; Pearson High School; Victoria Park High School
- Publication: Westringer
- Website: http://www.westeringhigh.co.za/

Westering High School is a public co-ed high school in Westering, Port Elizabeth, South Africa catering for English-speaking students from grade 8 to 12.

== History ==
Under the leadership of Mr Peter Blackbeard, Westering High School was established in 1970 with 185 pupils. It has grown into a high school of 980 pupils and 45 teaching staff.

Building extensions during the late seventies changed the physical appearance of the school.

== Coat of arms ==
This was designed by Mrs R Blackbeard, wife of the first principal of the school. The principal charge is the chevron which is also found on the P. The lamp of learning is placed at the honor point of the shield. The flame is the symbol of Christianity. The school colors are navy blue, gold white

== Subjects offered ==
=== Grade 8-9 ===
All Subjects are compulsory for Grade 8-9.

- English Primary Language
- Afrikaans or Xhosa ( Additional Language)
- Mathematics
- Social Sciences(SS) - which includes History & Geography
- Natural Sciences( NS) which includes Science and Biology
- Economic and Management Science( EMS) - Accounting & Business Economics
- Life Orientation (LO)
- Digital Technology (DT)
- Arts and Culture (A&C)
- Technology ( a wide variety of information and methods of how things work)

=== Grade 10-12 ===
A pupil must do 7 subjects 4 compulsory subjects from Group A (including two languages) and three from Group B

Group A (All compulsory)

- English (Home Language)
- Afrikaans or Xhosa (Additional language)
- Life Orientation
- Maths or Maths Literacy

Group B: (Must do 3 of these ) History, Geography, Life sciences (Biology), Physical Science, Accounting, Business Studies, Consumer Studies (Home Economics), Tourism, Music, Visual Arts (Art), Computer Applications Technology (CAT-Computyping ), Information technology (IT-Computer studies)
