= Tom Botha =

South African rugby union player

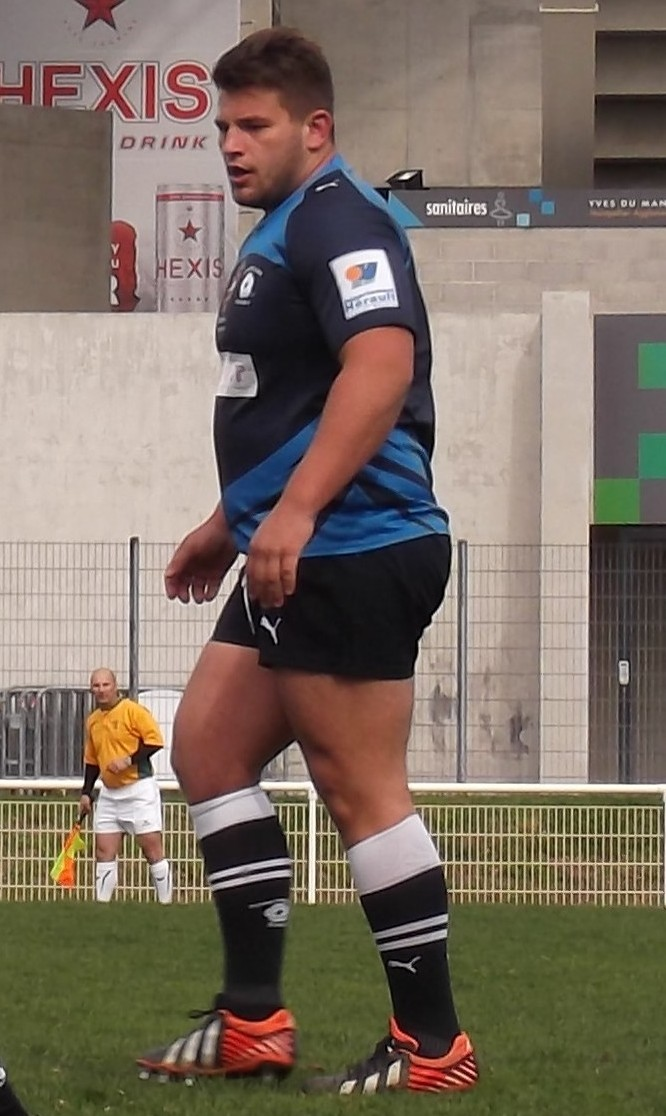
- Born: 31 August 1990 (age 36) Bellville, South Africa
- Height: 1.79 m (5 ft 10 1/2 in)
- Weight: 110 kg (240 lb; 17 st 5 lb)
- School: Paul Roos Gymnasium

Rugby union career
- Position: Tighthead Prop
- Current team: Ospreys
Youth career
- 2008: Western Province
- 2009: Sharks
- 2010–2011: Western Province
- 2012–2014: Montpellier
Senior career
Years	Team	Apps	(Points)
2011–2012	Western Province	17	(0)
2014–2015	Eastern Province Kings	15	(0)
2016	Southern Kings	15	(0)
2016–2017	Free State Cheetahs	8	(5)
2017–2018	Cheetahs	30	(0)
2017	Free State XV	1	(0)
2018–present	Ospreys	161	(0)
- Correct as of 6 May 2018
International career
Years	Team	Apps	(Points)
2008	South Africa Schools Academy	1	(0)
- Correct as of 22 April 2018

Tom Botha (born 31 August 1990) is a South African rugby union player, currently playing with the Ospreys in Wales for the Welsh Pro14. His regular position is tighthead prop.

== Rugby career ==
=== 2008 : Schools rugby ===
He represented Western Province at the 2008 Under-18 Academy Week tournament held in George, where he helped his side to victories in all three of their matches. Shortly after the tournament, he earned a call-up to the South Africa Schools Academy side that played against a South Africa Schools side, running out 41–19 winners in a warm-up match prior to the South Africa versus Australia test match during the 2008 Tri Nations Series. He also made a single appearance for Western Province U19 during the 2008 Under-19 Provincial Championship, coming on as a replacement in their 20–18 victory against Free State U19 in Cape Town.

=== 2009 : Sharks Under-19 ===
He moved to Durban in 2009 and played for the Sharks U19 in the 2009 Under-19 Provincial Championship. He appeared in all six matches that they played in the competition (starting four of their matches and playing off the bench in the other two) as the Sharks finished in fifth position in the competition.

=== 2010–2012 : Western Province ===
His time in Durban was short-lived, however, as he returned to Cape Town for the 2010 season. He started in four matches for Western Province U21 during the regular season of Group A of the Under-21 Provincial Championship, helping Western Province finish top of the log with eleven wins in their twelve matches. He didn't feature in their semi-final draw against Free State U21 – which saw Western Province progress to the final by virtue of scoring more tries in the match – but did start the final and helped Western Province win the title with a 43–32 victory over Blue Bulls U21.

He made his first team debut for Western Province in the 2011 Vodacom Cup, by starting their Round Two match against the Falcons as a loosehead prop in an 86–14 victory. He reverted to his more familiar tighthead prop role for their next three matches – a 56–9 victory over Namibian side Welwitschias in Botha's home debut, a 16–8 win over the Blue Bulls in Pretoria and a 23–22 win over Griquas. He came on as a half-time replacement in their final match of the regular season, a 26–12 victory over the Leopards in Potchefstroom, as Western Province went through the regular season with seven wins and a draw in their eight matches. He once again came on as a half-time replacement in their quarter final match against a Sharks XV, but ended the match in disappointment as the Sharks won 21–19 to eliminate Western Province from the competition. Botha started for Western Province in their compulsory friendly match against Boland Cavaliers prior to the 2011 Currie Cup Premier Division, but didn't feature for the senior side in the competition proper. Instead, Botha played for the Western Province U21 side that tried to retain the title they won in 2010. He started in nine of their first ten matches in the competition – coming on as a replacement in the other – but didn't feature in the play-offs, as Western Province fell short on this occasion, with the Sharks U21s beating them 19–12 in the semi-finals.

He was a key member of Western Province's 2012 Vodacom Cup campaign, starting nine of their ten matches in the competition and playing off the bench in the other. They won all seven of their matches during the regular season to finish top of the Southern Section log to qualify for the quarter-finals. Botha started their 58–34 victory over the Golden Lions in the quarter-finals, the 33–20 win over the Pumas in the semi-final and also in the final against four-time champions Griquas, where he helped Western Province to a 20–18 win to win the competition for the first time in their history. He was included in the Western Province squads for the 2012 Currie Cup Premier Division and was even included in a matchday squad for their match against the Sharks in Durban, but failed to get any game time in the competition.

=== 2012–2014 : Montpellier ===
In October 2012, the player announced that he joined Montpellier. He played for Montpellier's Under-23 team (the espoirs) during the 2012–2013 season and helped them to winning the competition, beating their Agen counterparts 37–20 in the final in May 2013. He again played for the Under-23 team during the 2013–2014 season, but failed to make the breakthrough into the first team.

=== 2014–2016 : Eastern Province Kings / Southern Kings ===
He returned to South Africa in June 2014 by joining Port Elizabeth-based side Eastern Province Kings on a short-term contract prior to their return to the Premier Division of the Currie Cup. He made his Eastern Province Kings (and Currie Cup) debut in their 16–35 defeat to former side Western Province in the opening round of the competition. He also started their matches against the Golden Lions and the Blue Bulls, the return leg against the Golden Lions and Western Province. and a match against the Free State Cheetahs. Botha finished on the losing side in all those matches as a disappointing season saw the Eastern Province Kings lose their first nine matches before securing a 26–25 win over the Pumas in their final match. At the end of the season, Botha signed a two-year contract extension to remain in Port Elizabeth until the end of 2016.

He appeared in just one match during the 2015 Vodacom Cup – a 19–27 defeat to Griquas – with a rib injury keeping him out for the remainder of the competition. He started eight of the Eastern Province Kings' matches during the 2015 Currie Cup Premier Division, including both their victories during the season (a 32–24 win over the Free State Cheetahs and a 40–37 win over Griquas two weeks later) as they slightly improved on their 2015 showing, finishing in seventh position.

At the end of 2015, the worsening financial situation at the Eastern Province Kings resulted in all players' contracts being declared null and void, but Botha was one of the first 20 players that joined the Southern Kings Super Rugby side in the 2016 Super Rugby season.

=== 2016–present : Free State Cheetahs / Cheetahs ===
In May 2016, the Cheetahs announced that Botha signed a two-year deal with the Bloemfontein-based side, joining them on 1 August 2016. 2018 Ospreys
