= Cornell Hess =

South African rugby union player

- Full name: Cornell Norman Hess
- Born: 1 March 1989 (age 37) Wynberg, Cape Town
- Height: 2.00 m (6 ft 6 1/2 in)
- Weight: 107 kg (236 lb; 16 st 12 lb)
- School: Afrikaanse Hoër Seunskool
- University: University of Stellenbosch

Rugby union career
- Position: Lock
- Current team: Angoulême
Youth career
- 2001–2005: SWD Eagles
- 2006–2010: Blue Bulls
Amateur team(s)
Years	Team	Apps	(Points)
2010	UP Tuks	1	(0)
Senior career
Years	Team	Apps	(Points)
2010–2013	Blue Bulls	39	(0)
2015–2016	Eastern Province Kings	23	(0)
2016	Southern Kings	1	(0)
2017–2018	SWD Eagles	21	(0)
2018–present	Angoulême	0	(0)
- Correct as of 27 October 2018
International career
Years	Team	Apps	(Points)
2008	South Africa Under-20	5	(0)

Cornell Hess is a South African rugby union player for Angoulême in the Pro D2 in France. His usual position is lock.

== Career ==
=== Blue Bulls ===
After representing SWD Eagles at several youth tournaments, he joined the Blue Bulls in 2006.

He made his first team debut for the Blue Bulls in the opening game of the 2010 Vodacom Cup, coming on as a substitute in their game against Griquas. He made a total of 28 appearances in this competition over the next three seasons and finally made his Currie Cup debut in the 2012 Currie Cup Premier Division.

=== Griquas ===
He joined Griquas for the 2014 season, but failed to make an appearance for the Kimberley-based side.

=== Eastern Province Kings ===
In January 2015, Hess had a trial spell with Port Elizabeth-based side the Eastern Province Kings prior to the 2015 season. Following the trial, he was offered a contract for the duration of the 2015 Vodacom Cup competition. He made his debut for the EP Kings in their second match of the competition, coming on as a second-half replacement in a 27–17 victory over Eastern Cape rivals the Border Bulldogs in East London.
