= Tazz Fuzani =

South African rugby union player

- Full name: Mthetheleli Godfrey Fuzani
- Born: 18 January 1991 (age 35) Uitenhage, South Africa
- Height: 1.97 m (6 ft 5 1/2 in)
- Weight: 116 kg (18 st 4 lb; 256 lb)
- School: HTS Bellville

Rugby union career
- Position: Lock / Prop
- Current team: Pumas
Youth career
- 2008: Western Province
Amateur team(s)
Years	Team	Apps	(Points)
2012–2013	UWC	11	(5)
Senior career
Years	Team	Apps	(Points)
2013–2014	Western Province	15	(0)
2015–2016	Eastern Province Kings	21	(5)
2017–19	Pumas	11	(0)
- Correct as of 8 July 2019

Mthetheleli Godfrey 'Tazz' Fuzani (born 18 January 1991) is a South African rugby union player for the Pumas in the Currie Cup and in the Rugby Challenge. His regular position is lock, but he has also started as a prop.

== Career ==
=== Youth and Varsity Rugby ===
Fuzani was part of the Western Province squad at the 2008 Under-18 Academy Week. In 2011, he was included in the UWC squad for the 2011 Varsity Shield competition and played twice in the 2012 Varsity Shield competition, starting the match against UKZN Impi as a prop. In 2013, he firmly established himself in the team under former South Africa national rugby union team coach Peter de Villiers, starting all nine matches.

=== Western Province ===
Fuzani was included in Western Province's squad for the 2013 Vodacom Cup and made his first class debut for them a mere five days after playing his final 2013 Varsity Shield match, starting their match against Border Bulldogs in Paarl. He played in all five remaining matches in that competition and was also included in the 2013 Currie Cup squad, subsequently being named in the starting line-up for Western Province's Round Six match against the Blue Bulls.

=== Stormers ===
In 2014, Fuzani was called up to the Stormers team for the 2014 Super Rugby season and was included on the bench for their match against the Reds in Brisbane.

=== Eastern Province Kings ===
In July 2014, Fuzani's agent confirmed that he would leave Cape Town at the end of the 2014 season and join Port Elizabeth-based side Eastern Province Kings on a two-year contract. He made his debut for the EP Kings by starting their first match of the 2015 Vodacom Cup season, a 19–27 defeat to defending champions Griquas.
