= Paul Schoeman =

South African rugby union player

- Born: 19 December 1992 (age 33) Cradock, South Africa
- Height: 1.88 m (6 ft 2 in)
- Weight: 112 kg (247 lb; 17 st 9 lb)
- School: Hoër Landbouskool Marlow, Cradock

Rugby union career
- Position: Number 8
- Current team: Free State Cheetahs
Youth career
- 2010: Eastern Province Country Districts
- 2011–2012: Eastern Province Kings
Senior career
Years	Team	Apps	(Points)
2013–2015	Eastern Province Kings	32	(65)
2016–2018	Cheetahs	45	(45)
2016–2017	Free State Cheetahs	12	(25)
2018-2019	Bulls	8	(0)
2019–2022	Honda Heat	20	(20)
2023–	Free State Cheetahs		
- Correct as of 1 October 2020

Paul 'Tier' Schoeman (/ˈskuːmən/) is a South African rugby union player for the Honda Heat in Top League. His regular position is number 8.

== Career ==
He played for the Eastern Province Country Districts at the 2010 Craven Week and the Eastern Province Kings from Under-19 and Under-21 teams between 2011 and 2012.

He was included in the senior squad for the 2013 Vodacom Cup, where he scored a try on his debut against the Border Bulldogs.

In June 2014, he was selected in the starting line-up for the Eastern Province Kings side to face Wales during a tour match during a 2014 incoming tour. He played the entire match as the Kings suffered a 12–34 defeat.

He made his Currie Cup debut for the Eastern Province Kings against the Blue Bulls in their third match of the 2014 season at Loftus Versfeld.

He scored a hat-trick of tries for the EP Kings in their second match of the 2015 Vodacom Cup competition, helping them to a 27–17 victory over Eastern Cape rivals the Border Bulldogs in East London.

He signed a two-year contract with Bloemfontein-based side Free State Cheetahs prior to the 2016 season.

He made his Super Rugby debut for the Cheetahs in their opening match of 2016 against the Jaguares.
