= Thembelani Bholi =

South African rugby union player

- Born: 18 January 1990 (age 36) East London, South Africa
- Height: 1.95 m (6 ft 5 in)
- Weight: 112 kg (247 lb; 17 st 9 lb)
- School: Jamangile SS School, Maclear

Rugby union career
- Position: Flanker / Lock
- Current team: Sharks / Sharks (Currie Cup)
Youth career
- 2007–2008: Border Country Districts
- 2010–2011: Eastern Province Kings
Senior career
Years	Team	Apps	(Points)
2012–2016	Eastern Province Kings	39	(15)
2016–2017	Southern Kings	16	(5)
2017	Pumas	9	(5)
2018–2019	Bulls	22	(0)
2018–2019	Blue Bulls XV	3	(0)
2018	Blue Bulls	4	(0)
2019–2020	Southern Kings	10	(0)
2020–2023	Sharks	8	(0)
2020–2023	Sharks (Currie Cup)	33	(25)
2023–	Valence Romans	20	(10)
- Correct as of 11 June 2024

Thembelani Bholi (born 18 January 1990) is a South African rugby union player for the Southern Kings in the Pro14. His regular position is flanker, but he can also play as a lock.

== Career ==
=== Youth ===
Bholi represented the Border Country Districts at the Under–18 Craven Week tournaments in both 2007 and 2008.

Bholi moved to Port Elizabeth in 2010 to join the Eastern Province Kings Academy. He appeared as a substitute in all eight of the Eastern Province U21s' matches during the 2010 Under-21 Provincial Championship, scoring two tries as the side made it all the way to the final, where they lost 53–36 to the Falcons U21 in George.

Bholi was an ever-present for the side during the 2011 Under-21 Provincial Championship, starting all eight of their matches. However, the season had the same outcome as the previous one, with the Eastern Province U21 side making it all the way to the final, where they lost; this time they lost 23–19 to Eastern Cape rivals Border U21 in a match in Wellington.

=== Eastern Province Kings ===
Bholi was one of a group of eight players that graduated from the academy Eastern Province Kings in its first year, signing a contract with the team for the 2012 season. He was named in their 2012 Vodacom Cup and 2012 Currie Cup First Division squads, but suffered a shoulder injury that prevented him from playing in any matches.

Bholi was then included in the squad for the 2013 Currie Cup First Division and eventually returned to action when he was named in the starting line-up for their match against the Leopards in Port Elizabeth. He made his first class debut on 12 July 2013, but could not prevent his side suffer a narrow 18–22 defeat to their rivals from Potchefstroom. After two appearances off the bench against the Boland Cavaliers and the Falcons, he started their match against the Border Bulldogs before losing his place to players returning from the 2013 Super Rugby season with the Southern Kings.

Bholi started all seven of their matches in the 2014 Vodacom Cup competition, but could not help the team to qualify to the quarter-finals for a third successive season. However, he made enough of an impression that he was selected in the starting line-up for the Eastern Province Kings side that faced Wales during a tour match during a 2014 incoming tour. He played the entire match as the Kings suffered a 12–34 defeat. Following a decision from the South African Rugby Union to expand the Currie Cup Premier Division from six teams to eight teams, the Eastern Province Kings were promoted to the 2014 Currie Cup Premier Division. Bholi made his first Currie Cup Premier Division start in their opening match of the season, a 35–16 defeat to Western Province. The Kings struggled to adjust to life in the Premier Division and lost their first nine matches of the season. They did, however, beat fellow promoted side the Pumas 26–25 in the final match of the season, with Bholi an unused reserve for that match. He made a total of seven appearances during the competition.

Bholi scored his first try for the EP Kings in first match of the 2015 Vodacom Cup season, a 19–27 defeat to defending champions Griquas.
