= Kevin Luiters =

South African rugby union player

- Born: 2 July 1992 (age 34) Port Elizabeth, South Africa
- Height: 1.74 m (5 ft 8 1/2 in)
- Weight: 80 kg (180 lb; 12 st 8 lb)
- School: Grey College, Bloemfontein
- University: University of the Free State
- Notable relative: Allister Coetzee (uncle)

Rugby union career
- Position: Scrum-half
- Current team: Eastern Province Elephants
Youth career
- 2005: Border Bulldogs
- 2008–2013: Free State Cheetahs
Amateur team(s)
Years	Team	Apps	(Points)
2012–2014	UFS Shimlas	16	(15)
Senior career
Years	Team	Apps	(Points)
2011–2013	Free State Cheetahs	6	(5)
2012–2013	Free State XV	6	(0)
2014–2015	Eastern Province Kings	15	(10)
2016	Southern Kings	8	(0)
2016	Pumas	6	(10)
2018	Timișoara Saracens	5	(0)
2019–present	Eastern Province Elephants	5	(5)
- Correct as of 3 September 2019
International career
Years	Team	Apps	(Points)
2008	South Africa Under-16 Elite Squad		
2008	South Africa Schools High Performance squad		
2012	South Africa Sevens		
- Correct as of 2 September 2013

Kevin Luiters (born 2 July 1992) is a South African rugby union player for the Eastern Province Elephants in the Currie Cup. His regular position is scrum-half.

== Career ==
=== Youth and Varsity Cup rugby ===
Luiters played for Border at the 2005 Under-13 Craven Week before joining Bloemfontein-based side the Free State Cheetahs. He represented them in two youth tournaments – at Under-16 level at the 2008 Grant Khomo Week (which led to his inclusion in the South African Under-16 Elite Squad) and at Under-18 level at the 2010 Craven Week (which led to his inclusion in the South African Under-18 High Performance Squad).

Luiters then played for the Free State U19 team in the 2010 Under-19 Provincial Championship competition and for the Free State U21 team in the 2012 Under-21 Provincial Championship and 2013 Under-21 Provincial Championship competitions.

Luiters also played some Varsity Cup rugby, representing the UFS Shimlas in the 2012, 2013 and 2014 competitions, scoring three tries in sixteen appearances.

=== Free State Cheetahs ===
Luiters made his first class debut when he appeared as a substitute in the Free State Cheetahs' 2011 Vodacom Cup match against the Falcons and also came on as a substitute against the Golden Lions in the same competition. Two more appearances followed in the 2012 Vodacom Cup competition, including his first senior start in their match against the Eastern Province Kings.

After making four more appearances for the Free State XV in the 2013 Vodacom Cup competition, he finally made his Currie Cup debut in the 2013 Currie Cup Premier Division match against the Sharks and scored his first senior try a week later when he dotted down in the 82nd minute.

=== Eastern Province Kings ===
On 3 April 2014, Luiters announced that he will join the Eastern Province Kings for the 2014 Currie Cup Premier Division season. He signed a contract with the Kings until the end of 2017. In June 2014, he was selected in the starting line-up for the Eastern Province Kings side to face Wales during a tour match during a 2014 incoming tour. He made his debut for the Kings, playing the first 53 minutes as the Kings suffered a 12–34 defeat. He appeared as a replacement in the Eastern Province Kings' opening match of the season against Western Province and had an immediate impact, scoring a try five minutes after coming on. However, it proved to be a mere consolation try as Western Province ran out 35–16 winners. He made a total of eight appearances during the 2014 Currie Cup Premier Division, but finished on the losing side in each of those appearances as the Kings finished bottom of the log.

== Personal ==
Luiters is the nephew of Allister Coetzee, former player and former coach of Western Province and the Stormers.
