= 2013 Eastern Province Kings season =

Team Information
- Stadium: Nelson Mandela Bay Stadium
- President: Cheeky Watson
- Director of Rugby: Alan Solomons (until August)

Currie Cup
- Coach: David Maidza
- Captain: Tiger Mangweni
- Rank: 2nd
- Record: Won 10, Lost 4 Runners-up
- Top points scorer: Scott van Breda (109)
- Top try scorer: Mpho Mbiyozo (6)

Vodacom Cup (South)
- Coach: David Maidza
- Captain: Mpho Mbiyozo
- Rank: 3rd (South); Lost in semi-finals
- Record: Won 6, Drew 1, Lost 2
- Top points scorer: Scott van Breda (54)
- Top try scorers: Siyanda Grey; Mpho Mbiyozo; Stefan Willemse (3)

Other seasons
- Previous season: ← 2012
- Next season: 2014 →

In 2013, the Eastern Province Kings in the Currie Cup and the Vodacom Cup.

== Chronological list of events ==
- 26 January 2013: The Eastern Province Kings Vodacom Cup side beat national club champions College Rovers 19–14 in a warm-up game.
- 1 February 2013: The Eastern Province Kings Vodacom Cup side beat club side Despatch 21–5.
- 26 February 2013: Former South Africa Under-20 head coach Eric Sauls is appointed by the Eastern Province Rugby Union as the Manager of Coaching Development.
- 4 April 2013: Vodacom Cup and Under–21 full-back Kieran Goss signs for English Championship side Cornish Pirates.
- 9 May 2013: Vodacom Cup players Schalk Oelofse and Mzwanele Zito, along with former Vodacom Cup player Justin van Staden all join the SWD Eagles prior to their 2013 Currie Cup First Division campaign.

== Players ==
=== Movement matrix ===
Eastern Province Kings transfers 2012–2013
| Pos | 2012 Currie Cup squad | Movements | 2013 Vodacom Cup squad | Movements | 2013 Currie Cup squad |
| PR | Kevin Buys (did not play); Charl du Plessis; Jaco Engels; Schalk Ferreira; Lizo Gqoboka; Sphephelo Mayaba (not in squad); Thabiso Mngomezulu (not in squad); Clint Newland; Brenden Olivier (not in squad); André Schlechter; Wayne Swart (did not play) | (substituted in) Zolani Faku (from Eastern Province U21); (substituted in) Ross Geldenhuys (from Free State Cheetahs) (substituted off) Clint Newland (released); (substituted off) André Schlechter (released); (substituted off) Wayne Swart (released) | Kevin Buys (SR); Charl du Plessis; Jaco Engels; Zolani Faku (did not play); Schalk Ferreira (SR); Ross Geldenhuys; Lizo Gqoboka; Sphephelo Mayaba (not in squad); Thabiso Mngomezulu (not in squad); Brenden Olivier | (substituted in) Marzuq Maarman (from Eastern Province U21); (substituted in) Enoch Mnyaka (from NMMU Young Guns); (substituted in) Pieter Stemmet (from Free State U21) (substituted off) Kevin Buys (to (France) CA Brive); (substituted off) Schalk Ferreira (tbc) | Charl du Plessis; Jaco Engels; Zolani Faku; Ross Geldenhuys^{1} Lizo Gqoboka; Marzuq Maarman; Sphephelo Mayaba; Thabiso Mngomezulu; Enoch Mnyaka; Brenden Olivier; Pieter Stemmet |
| HK | Boetie Britz; Bobby Dyer; Hannes Franklin; Frank Herne | (substituted in) Albé de Swardt (from (Italy) L'Aquila Rugby); (substituted in) Virgile Lacombe (from (France) Toulouse); (substituted in) Dane van der Westhuyzen (from Eastern Province U21); (substituted in) Madoda Yako (from Boland Cavaliers) (substituted off) Bobby Dyer (to Despatch); (substituted off) Frank Herne (to Pumas) | Boetie Britz; Albé de Swardt; Hannes Franklin; Virgile Lacombe; Dane van der Westhuyzen; Madoda Yako | (substituted off) Virgile Lacombe (to (France) Racing Métro) | Boetie Britz; Albé de Swardt; Hannes Franklin; Dane van der Westhuyzen; Madoda Yako |
| LK | Rynier Bernardo; David Bulbring; Thabo Mamojele; Darron Nell; Barend Pieterse (did not play); Johan Snyman (did not play); Wayne van Heerden | (substituted in) Daniel Adongo (from (New Zealand) Counties Manukau); (substituted in) Armand du Preez (from Eastern Province U19); (substituted in) Samora Fihlani (from Border Bulldogs); (substituted in) Schalk Oelofse (from NMMU Madibaz); (substituted in) Kuhle Sonkosi (from Eastern Province U21); (substituted in) Steven Sykes (from Sharks); (substituted in) Mzwanele Zito (from NMMU Madibaz) (substituted off) Barend Pieterse (retired); (substituted off) Johan Snyman (to (Wales) Scarlets) | Daniel Adongo; Rynier Bernardo; David Bulbring (SR); Armand du Preez; Samora Fihlani; Thabo Mamojele; Darron Nell; Schalk Oelofse; Kuhle Sonkosi; Steven Sykes (SR); Wayne van Heerden; Mzwanele Zito | (substituted off) David Bulbring (to Blue Bulls); (substituted off) Armand du Preez (not named in squad); (substituted off) Schalk Oelofse (to SWD Eagles); (substituted off) Kuhle Sonkosi (not named in squad); (substituted off) Mzwanele Zito (to SWD Eagles) | Daniel Adongo^{2} Rynier Bernardo; Samora Fihlani; Thabo Mamojele; Darron Nell; Steven Sykes; Wayne van Heerden |
| FL | Thembelani Bholi (did not play); Cornell du Preez; Mpho Mbiyozo; Devin Oosthuizen; Wimpie van der Walt; Luke Watson | (substituted in) Tim Agaba (from NMMU Madibaz); (substituted in) Dalton Davis (from Blue Bulls U21); (substituted in) Renier Erasmus (from Eastern Province U21); (substituted in) Tomás Leonardi (from (Argentina) S.I.C.); (substituted in) Heinrich Leonard (from Eastern Province U21); (substituted in) Kuselo Moyake (from SK Walmers); (substituted in) Stefan Willemse (from Sharks U21) | Tim Agaba; Thembelani Bholi (not in squad); Dalton Davis; Cornell du Preez (SR); Renier Erasmus (did not play); Heinrich Leonard (did not play); Tomás Leonardi; Mpho Mbiyozo; Kuselo Moyake; Devin Oosthuizen; Wimpie van der Walt (SR); Luke Watson; Stefan Willemse | (substituted off) Heinrich Leonard (not named in squad); (substituted off) Tomás Leonardi (to (Argentina) S.I.C.); (substituted off) Wimpie van der Walt (to (Japan) NTT DoCoMo Red Hurricanes) | Tim Agaba; Thembelani Bholi; Dalton Davis; Cornell du Preez; Renier Erasmus; Mpho Mbiyozo; Kuselo Moyake; Devin Oosthuizen; Luke Watson; Stefan Willemse |
| N8 | Jacques Engelbrecht | (substituted in) Aidon Davis (from Eastern Province U19); (substituted in) Siya Mangaliso (from Eastern Province U21); (substituted in) Paul Schoeman (from Eastern Province U21) | Aidon Davis; Jacques Engelbrecht (SR); Siya Mangaliso (did not play); Paul Schoeman | (substituted in) Stephan Zaayman (from Eastern Province U19) (substituted off) Jacques Engelbrecht (to Blue Bulls) | Aidon Davis; Siya Mangaliso; Paul Schoeman; Stephan Zaayman |
| SH | Boela Abrahams (did not play); Danie Faasen; Scott Mathie; Falie Oelschig; Reynier van Rooyen | (substituted in) Dwayne Kelly (from Eastern Province Kings U21) (substituted off) Danie Faasen (to UP Tuks); (substituted off) Reynier van Rooyen (to Pumas) | Boela Abrahams; Dwayne Kelly; Scott Mathie; Falie Oelschig (not in squad) | | Boela Abrahams; Dwayne Kelly; Scott Mathie; Falie Oelschig (not in squad) |
| FH | Wesley Dunlop; Shane Gates; Louis Strydom (did not play); Justin van Staden (did not play) | (substituted in) Marlou van Niekerk (from Eastern Province U21) (substituted off) Louis Strydom (to Griffons); (substituted off) Justin van Staden (to NMMU Madibaz) | Wesley Dunlop; Shane Gates; Marlou van Niekerk | | Wesley Dunlop^{3} Shane Gates; Marlou van Niekerk |
| CE | Tiger Mangweni; Foxy Ntleki; Wayne Stevens; Matthew Tayler-Smith (did not play) | (substituted in) Ronnie Cooke (from (France) Grenoble); (substituted in) Andile Jho (from Blue Bulls U21); (substituted in) Waylon Murray (from Lions); (substituted in) Andries Strauss (from Free State Cheetahs) (substituted off) Matthew Tayler-Smith (not named in squad) | Ronnie Cooke (SR); Andile Jho; Tiger Mangweni; Waylon Murray; Foxy Ntleki; Wayne Stevens; Andries Strauss (SR) | (substituted off) Waylon Murray (to Blue Bulls) | Ronnie Cooke; Andile Jho; Tiger Mangweni; Foxy Ntleki; Wayne Stevens; Andries Strauss |
| WG | Siyanda Grey; Michael Killian; Norman Nelson; Jongi Nokwe; Paul Perez; Marcello Sampson; Andile Witbooi (did not play) | (substituted in) Eben Barnard (from Eastern Province U21); (substituted in) Ofentse Boloko (from Eastern Province U21); (substituted in) Yamkela Ngam (from Eastern Province U21); (substituted in) Brian Skosana (from Eastern Province U21) (substituted off) Jongi Nokwe (to Falcons); (substituted off) Paul Perez (to (France) Biarritz) | Eben Barnard; Ofentse Boloko; Siyanda Grey; Michael Killian; Norman Nelson; Yamkela Ngam; Marcello Sampson; Brian Skosana; Andile Witbooi (did not play) | (substituted in) Sergeal Petersen (from Eastern Province Kings U18) (substituted off) Ofentse Boloko (not named in squad) | Eben Barnard; Siyanda Grey; Michael Killian; Norman Nelson; Yamkela Ngam; Sergeal Petersen; Marcello Sampson; Brian Skosana; Andile Witbooi |
| FB | SP Marais; Siviwe Soyizwapi; Mzwandile Stick (did not play); Scott van Breda; George Whitehead | (substituted in) Ntabeni Dukisa (from Border Bulldogs); (substituted in) Kayle van Zyl (from Eastern Province Kings U21) (substituted off) Mzwandile Stick (retired) | Ntabeni Dukisa; SP Marais (SR); Siviwe Soyizwapi; Scott van Breda; Kayle van Zyl; George Whitehead (SR) | (substituted off) SP Marais (to Sharks) | Ntabeni Dukisa; Siviwe Soyizwapi; Scott van Breda; Kayle van Zyl; George Whitehead |

^{1} Ross Geldenhuys joined Western Province during the 2013 Currie Cup.
^{2} Daniel Adongo joined the Indianapolis Colts during the 2013 Currie Cup.
^{3} Wesley Dunlop joined the US Montauban during the 2013 Currie Cup.
(did not play) indicates a player was included in a squad, but made no appearances in the competition.
(not in squad) indicates a player was not included in the squad, remained at the EP Kings and was in previous and future squads, usually due to a long-term injury.
(SR) indicates a player was not included in the squad for the 2013 Vodacom Cup, but did represent the Southern Kings in the 2013 Super Rugby season.

== Vodacom Cup ==
=== Log ===
2013 Vodacom Cup Southern Section table
| Pos | Team | Pld | W | D | L | PF | PA | PD | TF | TA | TB | LB | Pts | Qualification |
|---|---|---|---|---|---|---|---|---|---|---|---|---|---|---|
| 1 | Sharks XV | 7 | 6 | 0 | 1 | 279 | 166 | +113 | 32 | 18 | 4 | 1 | 29 | Qualified for the Quarter Finals |
| 2 | Western Province | 7 | 5 | 1 | 1 | 208 | 153 | +55 | 26 | 20 | 4 | 1 | 27 | Qualified for the Quarter Finals |
| 3 | Eastern Province Kings | 7 | 5 | 1 | 1 | 191 | 154 | +37 | 22 | 16 | 3 | 0 | 25 | Qualified for the Quarter Finals |
| 4 | Pampas XV | 7 | 4 | 1 | 2 | 238 | 192 | +46 | 32 | 25 | 4 | 0 | 22 | Qualified for the Quarter Finals |
| 5 | Free State XV | 7 | 2 | 0 | 5 | 195 | 190 | +5 | 25 | 22 | 4 | 5 | 17 | |
| 6 | SWD Eagles | 7 | 1 | 0 | 6 | 147 | 202 | −55 | 18 | 22 | 2 | 4 | 10 | |
| 7 | Border Bulldogs | 7 | 2 | 0 | 5 | 143 | 239 | −96 | 15 | 34 | 0 | 1 | 9 | |
| 8 | Boland Cavaliers | 7 | 1 | 1 | 5 | 151 | 256 | −105 | 19 | 32 | 1 | 2 | 9 | |

Rules for classification:
- 4 points for a win
- 2 points for a draw
- 1 bonus point for a loss by seven points or less
- 1 bonus point for scoring four or more tries in a match

=== Round-by-round ===
Team Progression – 2013 Vodacom Cup
| Team | R1 | R2 | R3 | R4 | R5 | R6 | R7 | QF | SF |
|---|---|---|---|---|---|---|---|---|---|
| Opposition | PAM | BDR | WPr | FSt | SWD | SHA | BOL | BUL | PMA |
| Cumulative Points | 2 | 7 | 7 | 11 | 16 | 20 | 25 | --- | --- |
| Southern Section Position | 5th | 2nd | 5th | 4th | 4th | 4th | 3rd | --- | --- |
| Key: | win | draw | loss | | | | | | |

=== Results ===
| 9 March 2013 | Eastern Province Kings | 20–20 | Pampas XV | Nelson Mandela Bay Stadium, Port Elizabeth |
| 16:45 | Try: Scott van Breda 14'; Con: Wesley Dunlop (0/1); Pen: Wesley Dunlop 4', 23', 32', 80' (4/6); Scott van Breda 59' (1/1) | Scoreboard | Try: Manuel Montero 74'; Con: Benjamín Madero (0/1); Pen: Benjamín Madero 1', 17', 20', 66', 68' (5/7); Cards: Javier Rojas Alvarez (yellow card) 32' to 42' | Attendance: 4,550; Referee: Francois Pretorius |

| 16 March 2013 | Border Bulldogs | 22–30 | Eastern Province Kings | Mthatha Stadium, Mthatha |
| 15:00 | Try: Joe Seerane 35', 44'; Sinovuyo Nyoka 80'; Con: Karlo Aspeling 36', 45' (2/3); Pen: Karlo Aspeling 3' (1/1) | Scoreboard | Try: Paul Schoeman 17'; Virgile Lacombe 24'; Devin Oosthuizen 29'; Siviwe Soyizwapi 54'; Con: Wesley Dunlop 18', 25' (2/4); Pen: Wesley Dunlop 10' (1/1); Scott van Breda 75' (1/3) | Referee: Ben Crouse |

| 22 March 2013 | Eastern Province Kings | 18–43 | Western Province | NMMU Stadium, Port Elizabeth |
| 19:00 | Try: Boetie Britz 40'; Mpho Mbiyozo 43'; Con: Wesley Dunlop 44' (1/2); Pen: Wesley Dunlop 4', 54' (2/4) | Scoreboard | Try: Ruan Botha 6'; Chris Cloete 12', 20', 36'; Cheslin Kolbe 26'; Con: Tim Swiel 7', 13', 27' (3/5); Pen: Gary van Aswegen 57', 62', 69' (3/3); Drop: Gary van Aswegen 50' (1/1); Cheslin Kolbe (0/1) | Attendance: 3,400; Referee: Pro Legoete |

| 6 April 2013 | Free State XV | 13–17 | Eastern Province Kings | Free State Stadium, Bloemfontein |
| 14:45 | Try: Ludwig Erasmus 34'; Oupa Mohojé 45'; Con: Tewis de Bruyn (0/2); Pen: Tewis de Bruyn 50' (1/3) | Scoreboard | Try: Wayne Stevens 23'; Con: Scott van Breda (0/1); Pen: Scott van Breda 14', 48', 66', 76' (4/6) | Referee: Sindile Mayende |

| 12 April 2013 | Eastern Province Kings | 52–10 | SWD Eagles | NMMU Stadium, Port Elizabeth |
| 15:00 | Try: Yamkela Ngam 1', 38'; Scott van Breda 6'; Siyanda Grey 11', 22'; Luke Watson 50'; Tiger Mangweni 57'; Con: Scott van Breda 2', 7', 12', 23', 39', 51', 58' (7/7); Pen: Scott van Breda 36' (1/1) | Scoreboard | Try: Jeff Taljard 18'; Kabamba Floors 62'; Con: Jeff Taljard (0/2); Pen: Jeff Taljard (0/1) | Attendance: 1,000; Referee: Marius van der Westhuizen |

| 20 April 2013 | Eastern Province Kings | 27–23 | Sharks XV | Nelson Mandela Bay Stadium, Port Elizabeth |
| 16:15 | Try: Ntabeni Dukisa 47'; Siyanda Grey 63'; Stefan Willemse 67'; Con: Ntabeni Dukisa 48' (1/1); Kayle van Zyl 64', 68' (2/2); Pen: Ntabeni Dukisa 4' (1/3); Kayle van Zyl 73' (1/2) | Scoreboard | Try: Guy Alexander 53'; Con: Fred Zeilinga (0/1); Pen: Fred Zeilinga 1', 6', 14', 25', 34', 64' (6/7) | Attendance: 500; Referee: Ben Crouse |

| 27 April 2013 | Boland Cavaliers | 23–27 | Eastern Province Kings | Wesbank Stadium, Malmesbury |
| 16:00 | Try: Senan van der Merwe 25'; Clemen Lewis 73'; Con: Jacquin Jansen 26', 74' (2/2); Pen: Jacquin Jansen 10', 14', 59' (3/5) | Scoreboard | Try: Paul Schoeman 31'; Stefan Willemse 49'; Kayle van Zyl 55'; Devin Oosthuizen 78'; Con: Scott van Breda (0/1); Kayle van Zyl 50', 56' (2/2); Wesley Dunlop (0/1); Pen: Scott van Breda 3' (1/1) | Attendance: 4,800; Referee: Gerrie de Bruin |

| Quarter-final | 4 May 2013 | Blue Bulls | 31–34 | Eastern Province Kings | Loftus Versfeld, Pretoria |
| | 16:30 | Try: Sampie Mastriet 33'; Dries Swanepoel 36'; Wiaan Liebenberg 59'; Basil Short 63'; Con: Handré Pollard 34', 37', 60', 64' (4/4); Pen: Handré Pollard 25' (1/1); Drop: Handré Pollard (0/1) | Scoreboard | Try: Stefan Willemse 45'; Mpho Mbiyozo 72'; Dalton Davis 76'; Lizo Gqoboka 82'; Con: Kayle van Zyl 45' (1/1); Wesley Dunlop 72', 76', 82' (3/3); Pen: Scott van Breda 9', 18' (2/2); Kayle van Zyl (0/1) | Referee: Tiaan Jonker |

| Semi-final | 10 May 2013 | Pumas | 39–13 | Eastern Province Kings | Mbombela Stadium, Mbombela |
| | 16:30 | Try: Roscko Speckman 32'; Coenie van Wyk 63'; JW Bell 76'; Con: Carl Bezuidenhout 33', 64', 77' (3/3); Pen: Carl Bezuidenhout 20', 23', 27', 44', 68' (5/5); Drop: Carl Bezuidenhout 9' (1/2); Corné Steenkamp (0/1) | Scoreboard | Try: Mpho Mbiyozo 38'; Con: Wesley Dunlop 38' (1/1); Pen: Wesley Dunlop 55', 60' (2/2) | Referee: Tiaan Jonker |

=== Player statistics ===
The following table shows players statistics for the 2013 Vodacom Cup season:

Player Statistics – 2013 Vodacom Cup
| Player | Starts | Used Sub | Unused Sub | Points | Tries | Cons | Pens | DGs | YC | RC |
|---|---|---|---|---|---|---|---|---|---|---|
| Charl du Plessis | 6 | 2 | 0 | 0 | 0 | 0 | 0 | 0 | 0 | 0 |
| Jaco Engels | 1 | 1 | 0 | 0 | 0 | 0 | 0 | 0 | 0 | 0 |
| Ross Geldenhuys | 5 | 2 | 0 | 0 | 0 | 0 | 0 | 0 | 0 | 0 |
| Lizo Gqoboka | 5 | 1 | 0 | 5 | 1 | 0 | 0 | 0 | 0 | 0 |
| Brenden Olivier | 1 | 3 | 0 | 0 | 0 | 0 | 0 | 0 | 0 | 0 |
| Boetie Britz | 5 | 2 | 0 | 5 | 1 | 0 | 0 | 0 | 0 | 0 |
| Hannes Franklin | 2 | 0 | 0 | 0 | 0 | 0 | 0 | 0 | 0 | 0 |
| Virgile Lacombe | 2 | 1 | 0 | 5 | 1 | 0 | 0 | 0 | 0 | 0 |
| Dane van der Westhuyzen | 0 | 6 | 0 | 0 | 0 | 0 | 0 | 0 | 0 | 0 |
| Daniel Adongo | 3 | 0 | 0 | 0 | 0 | 0 | 0 | 0 | 0 | 0 |
| Rynier Bernardo | 2 | 0 | 0 | 0 | 0 | 0 | 0 | 0 | 0 | 0 |
| Samora Fihlani | 6 | 2 | 0 | 0 | 0 | 0 | 0 | 0 | 0 | 0 |
| Thabo Mamojele | 1 | 1 | 0 | 0 | 0 | 0 | 0 | 0 | 0 | 0 |
| Darron Nell | 3 | 0 | 0 | 0 | 0 | 0 | 0 | 0 | 0 | 0 |
| Schalk Oelofse | 0 | 1 | 0 | 0 | 0 | 0 | 0 | 0 | 0 | 0 |
| Wayne van Heerden | 0 | 1 | 0 | 0 | 0 | 0 | 0 | 0 | 0 | 0 |
| Stefan Willemse | 2 | 3 | 0 | 15 | 3 | 0 | 0 | 0 | 0 | 0 |
| Mzwanele Zito | 1 | 0 | 0 | 0 | 0 | 0 | 0 | 0 | 0 | 0 |
| Tim Agaba | 1 | 1 | 1 | 0 | 0 | 0 | 0 | 0 | 0 | 0 |
| Aidon Davis | 1 | 2 | 0 | 0 | 0 | 0 | 0 | 0 | 0 | 0 |
| Dalton Davis | 1 | 4 | 0 | 5 | 1 | 0 | 0 | 0 | 0 | 0 |
| Tomás Leonardi | 4 | 0 | 0 | 0 | 0 | 0 | 0 | 0 | 0 | 0 |
| Mpho Mbiyozo | 6 | 1 | 0 | 15 | 3 | 0 | 0 | 0 | 0 | 0 |
| Kuselo Moyake | 0 | 2 | 0 | 0 | 0 | 0 | 0 | 0 | 0 | 0 |
| Devin Oosthuizen | 5 | 0 | 0 | 10 | 2 | 0 | 0 | 0 | 0 | 0 |
| Paul Schoeman | 8 | 0 | 0 | 10 | 2 | 0 | 0 | 0 | 0 | 0 |
| Luke Watson | 1 | 0 | 0 | 5 | 1 | 0 | 0 | 0 | 0 | 0 |
| Boela Abrahams | 0 | 3 | 0 | 0 | 0 | 0 | 0 | 0 | 0 | 0 |
| Dwayne Kelly | 0 | 2 | 0 | 0 | 0 | 0 | 0 | 0 | 0 | 0 |
| Scott Mathie | 9 | 0 | 0 | 0 | 0 | 0 | 0 | 0 | 0 | 0 |
| Kayle van Zyl | 2 | 4 | 0 | 18 | 1 | 5 | 1 | 0 | 0 | 0 |
| Wesley Dunlop | 4 | 2 | 0 | 41 | 0 | 7 | 9 | 0 | 0 | 0 |
| Shane Gates | 4 | 0 | 0 | 0 | 0 | 0 | 0 | 0 | 0 | 0 |
| Marlou van Niekerk | 0 | 2 | 1 | 0 | 0 | 0 | 0 | 0 | 0 | 0 |
| Andile Jho | 1 | 3 | 1 | 0 | 0 | 0 | 0 | 0 | 0 | 0 |
| Tiger Mangweni | 8 | 0 | 0 | 5 | 1 | 0 | 0 | 0 | 0 | 0 |
| Waylon Murray | 0 | 1 | 0 | 0 | 0 | 0 | 0 | 0 | 0 | 0 |
| Foxy Ntleki | 0 | 2 | 0 | 0 | 0 | 0 | 0 | 0 | 0 | 0 |
| Brian Skosana | 2 | 0 | 1 | 0 | 0 | 0 | 0 | 0 | 0 | 0 |
| Wayne Stevens | 7 | 0 | 0 | 5 | 1 | 0 | 0 | 0 | 0 | 0 |
| Scott van Breda | 6 | 0 | 0 | 54 | 2 | 7 | 10 | 0 | 0 | 0 |
| Eben Barnard | 1 | 0 | 0 | 0 | 0 | 0 | 0 | 0 | 0 | 0 |
| Siyanda Grey | 6 | 0 | 0 | 15 | 3 | 0 | 0 | 0 | 0 | 0 |
| Michael Killian | 3 | 0 | 0 | 0 | 0 | 0 | 0 | 0 | 0 | 0 |
| Norman Nelson | 1 | 0 | 0 | 0 | 0 | 0 | 0 | 0 | 0 | 0 |
| Yamkela Ngam | 3 | 0 | 0 | 10 | 2 | 0 | 0 | 0 | 0 | 0 |
| Marcello Sampson | 1 | 0 | 0 | 0 | 0 | 0 | 0 | 0 | 0 | 0 |
| Ntabeni Dukisa | 2 | 3 | 1 | 10 | 1 | 1 | 1 | 0 | 0 | 0 |
| Siviwe Soyizwapi | 3 | 0 | 0 | 5 | 1 | 0 | 0 | 0 | 0 | 0 |

- Ofentse Boloko, Albé de Swardt, Armand du Preez, Renier Erasmus, Zolani Faku, Heinrich Leonard, Siya Mangaliso, Kuhle Sonkosi, Andile Witbooi and Madoda Yako were named in the 2013 Vodacom Cup squad, but never included in a matchday 22.

=== Player Appearances ===
Player Appearances – 2013 Vodacom Cup
| Player | PAM | BDR | WPr | FSt | SWD | SHA | BOL | BUL | PMA |
|---|---|---|---|---|---|---|---|---|---|
| Brenden Olivier | 1 | | 17 (substituted in) | 17 (substituted in) | 17 (substituted in) | | | | |
| Virgile Lacombe | 2 | 2 | | | | 16 (substituted in) | | | |
| Ross Geldenhuys | 3 | 3 | 3 | 3 | 3 | | | 17 (substituted in) | 17 (substituted in) |
| Rynier Bernardo | 4 | 4 | | | | | | | |
| Samora Fihlani | 5 | 5 | 5 | 5 | 5 | 4 | | 18 (substituted in) | 18 (substituted in) |
| Tomás Leonardi | 6 | | | | | | 7 | 7 | 6 |
| Mpho Mbiyozo | 7 | 7 | 7 | | 7 | 7 | | 20 (substituted in) | 7 |
| Devin Oosthuizen | 8 | 6 | | | | 6 | 6 | 6 | |
| Scott Mathie | 9 | 9 | 9 | 9 | 9 | 9 | 9 | 9 | 9 |
| Wesley Dunlop | 10 | 10 | 10 | | | | 21 (substituted in) | 21 (substituted in) | 10 |
| Norman Nelson | 11 | | | | | | | | |
| Wayne Stevens | 12 | 13 | 13 | 13 | 13 | | | 13 | 13 |
| Scott van Breda | 13 | 11 | | 15 | 15 | | 13 | 15 | |
| Siyanda Grey | 14 | 14 | 14 | 14 | 14 | 14 | | | |
| Siviwe Soyizwapi | 15 | 15 | 15 | | | | | | |
| Dane van der Westhuyzen | 16 (substituted in) | 16 (substituted in) | 16 (substituted in) | 16 (substituted in) | 16 (substituted in) | | | | 16 (substituted in) |
| Charl du Plessis | 17 (substituted in) | 1 | 1 | 1 | | 17 (substituted in) | 3 | 3 | 3 |
| Aidon Davis | 18 (substituted in) | 18 (substituted in) | 6 | | | | | | |
| Kuselo Moyake | 19 (substituted in) | 19 (substituted in) | | | | | | | |
| Boela Abrahams | 20 (substituted in) | 20 (substituted in) | 20 (substituted in) | | | | | | |
| Ntabeni Dukisa | 21 | 22 (substituted in) | 21 (substituted in) | 10 | 21 (substituted in) | 15 | | | |
| Andile Jho | 22 | | | 22 (substituted in) | 22 (substituted in) | 13 | 22 (substituted in) | | |
| Paul Schoeman | | 8 | 8 | 8 | 6 | 8 | 8 | 8 | 8 |
| Tiger Mangweni | | 12 | 12 | 12 | 12 | 12 | 12 | 12 | 12 |
| Lizo Gqoboka | | 17 (substituted in) | | | 1 | 1 | 1 | 1 | 1 |
| Waylon Murray | | 21 (substituted in) | | | | | | | |
| Boetie Britz | | | 2 | 2 | 2 | 2 | 16 (substituted in) | 16 (substituted in) | 2 |
| Thabo Mamojele | | | 4 | 19 (substituted in) | | | | | |
| Yamkela Ngam | | | 11 | 11 | 11 | | | | |
| Wayne van Heerden | | | 18 (substituted in) | | | | | | |
| Dalton Davis | | | 19 (substituted in) | 7 | 19 (substituted in) | | | 19 (substituted in) | 19 (substituted in) |
| Foxy Ntleki | | | 22 (substituted in) | | | | | | 22 (substituted in) |
| Mzwanele Zito | | | | 4 | | | | | |
| Tim Agaba | | | | 6 | | 19 | 19 (substituted in) | | |
| Schalk Oelofse | | | | 18 (substituted in) | | | | | |
| Kayle van Zyl | | | | 20 (substituted in) | 20 (substituted in) | 20 (substituted in) | 15 | 22 (substituted in) | 15 |
| Marlou van Niekerk | | | | 21 (substituted in) | | 21 | | | 21 (substituted in) |
| Darron Nell | | | | | 4 | | 4 | | 5 |
| Luke Watson | | | | | 8 | | | | |
| Shane Gates | | | | | 10 | 10 | 10 | 10 | |
| Stefan Willemse | | | | | 18 (substituted in) | 18 (substituted in) | 18 (substituted in) | 4 | 4 |
| Jaco Engels | | | | | | 3 | 17 (substituted in) | | |
| Daniel Adongo | | | | | | 5 | 5 | 5 | |
| Michael Killian | | | | | | 11 | | 14 | 11 |
| Brian Skosana | | | | | | 22 | 14 | | 14 |
| Hannes Franklin | | | | | | | 2 | 2 | |
| Eben Barnard | | | | | | | 11 | | |
| Dwayne Kelly | | | | | | | 20 (substituted in) | | 20 (substituted in) |
| Marcello Sampson | | | | | | | | 11 | |

- Ofentse Boloko, Albé de Swardt, Armand du Preez, Renier Erasmus, Zolani Faku, Heinrich Leonard, Siya Mangaliso, Kuhle Sonkosi, Andile Witbooi and Madoda Yako were named in the 2013 Vodacom Cup squad, but never included in a matchday 22.

== Currie Cup ==
=== Log ===
2013 Currie Cup First Division Log
| Pos | Team | Pld | W | D | L | PF | PA | PD | TF | TA | TB | LB | Pts | Qualification |
|---|---|---|---|---|---|---|---|---|---|---|---|---|---|---|
| 1 | Pumas (C) | 14 | 14 | 0 | 0 | 601 | 254 | +347 | 76 | 31 | 10 | 0 | 66 | Promotion Play-Offs; Title play-off semi-final |
| 2 | Eastern Province Kings | 14 | 10 | 0 | 4 | 441 | 297 | +144 | 51 | 34 | 7 | 3 | 50 | Title play-off semi-final |
| 3 | Leopards | 14 | 8 | 0 | 6 | 448 | 398 | +50 | 63 | 46 | 9 | 3 | 44 | Title play-off semi-final |
| 4 | SWD Eagles | 14 | 7 | 0 | 7 | 460 | 452 | +8 | 58 | 58 | 8 | 5 | 41 | Title play-off semi-final |
| 5 | Boland Cavaliers | 14 | 6 | 1 | 7 | 329 | 393 | −64 | 45 | 54 | 3 | 3 | 32 | |
| 6 | Griffons | 14 | 3 | 2 | 9 | 367 | 534 | −167 | 49 | 72 | 7 | 8 | 31 | |
| 7 | Border Bulldogs | 14 | 4 | 0 | 10 | 277 | 365 | −88 | 32 | 45 | 3 | 6 | 25 | |
| 8 | Falcons | 14 | 2 | 1 | 11 | 349 | 579 | −230 | 45 | 79 | 6 | 2 | 18 | |

Rules for classification: 4 points for a win; 2 points for a draw; 1 bonus point for a loss by seven points or less; 1 bonus point for scoring four or more tries in a match
(C) Champion

=== Round-by-round ===
Team Progression – 2013 Currie Cup
| Team | R1 | R2 | R3 | R4 | R5 | R6 | R7 | R8 | R9 | R10 | R11 | R12 | R13 | R14 |
|---|---|---|---|---|---|---|---|---|---|---|---|---|---|---|
| Opposition | PMA | GRF | LEO | SWD | BOL | GFA | BDR | PMA | GRF | LEO | SWD | BOL | GFA | BDR |
| Cumulative Points | 0 | 5 | 6 | 11 | 12 | 17 | 21 | 23 | 28 | 33 | 37 | 42 | 46 | 51 |
| Log Position | 6th | 4th | 5th | 5th | 5th | 3rd | 4th | 4th | 4th | 3rd | 2nd | 2nd | 2nd | 2nd |
| Key: | win | draw | loss | | | | | | | | | | | |

=== Results ===
| 28 June 2013 | Eastern Province Kings | 13–29 | Pumas | Nelson Mandela Bay Stadium, Port Elizabeth |
| 19:10 | Try: Wesley Dunlop 57'; Con: Wesley Dunlop 58' (1/1); Pen: Wesley Dunlop 19', 27' (2/3) | Scoreboard; Report | Try: Jerome Pretorius 16', 70'; Con: Carl Bezuidenhout 17', 71' (2/2); Pen: Carl Bezuidenhout 5', 29', 32', 53' (4/6); Drop: Carl Bezuidenhout 50' (1/1); Cards: Stefan Watermeyer (yellow card) 62' to 71'; RW Kember (yellow card) 68' to 78' | Attendance: 3,400; Referee: Marius Jonker |

| 6 July 2013 | Griffons | 21–37 | Eastern Province Kings | North West Stadium, Welkom |
| 15:00 | Try: Chris Ehlers 21'; Elandré Huggett 25'; Lehan Koekemoer 65'; Con: Louis Strydom 22', 26', 66' (3/3) | Scoreboard; Report | Try: Aidon Davis 7'; Dalton Davis 28'; Hadleigh Parkes 37'; Siviwe Soyizwapi 39'; Ross Geldenhuys 61'; Con: Wesley Dunlop 8', 29', 38' (3/5); Pen: Wesley Dunlop 10', 64' (2/3); Scott van Breda (0/1) | Attendance: 100; Referee: Jaco Kotze |

| 12 July 2013 | Eastern Province Kings | 18–22 | Leopards | Nelson Mandela Bay Stadium, Port Elizabeth |
| 19:00 | Pen: Scott van Breda 9', 51', 57', 75' (4/4); Wesley Dunlop 14', 27' (2/2) | Scoreboard; Report | Try: Edmar Marais 5'; Morné Hanekom 33'; Johann Laker 71'; Con: Adriaan Engelbrecht 6', 34' (2/3); Pen: Adriaan Engelbrecht 11' (1/2) | Referee: Sindile Mayende |

| 19 July 2013 | SWD Eagles | 34–35 | Eastern Province Kings | Outeniqua Park, George |
| 19:10 | Try: Alshaun Bock 4', 47', 56'; Jeff Taljard 17'; Shaun Raubenheimer 28'; Con: Jeff Taljard 5', 18', 57' (3/5); Pen: Jeff Taljard (0/1); Justin van Staden 69' (1/1); Cards: Christo du Plessis (yellow card) 36' to 46' | Scoreboard; Report | Try: Mpho Mbiyozo 37', 72'; Aidon Davis 40'; Siviwe Soyizwapi 52'; Marlou van Niekerk 76'; Con: Ntabeni Dukisa (0/2); Marlou van Niekerk 53' (1/2); Kayle van Zyl 77' (1/1); Pen: Ntabeni Dukisa 14', 22' (2/4) | Referee: Pro Legoete |

| 26 July 2013 | Eastern Province Kings | 23–30 | Boland Cavaliers | Nelson Mandela Bay Stadium, Port Elizabeth |
| 16:45 | Try: Mpho Mbiyozo 9'; Wayne Stevens 68'; Siviwe Soyizwapi 73'; Con: Wesley Dunlop (0/1); Scott van Breda 69' (1/2); Pen: Wesley Dunlop 15' (1/1); Scott van Breda 31' (1/1) | Scoreboard; Report | Try: Zandré Jordaan 5'; PJ van Zyl 20'; Jacquin Jansen 44'; Con: Len Olivier 6', 21', 45' (3/3); Pen: Len Olivier 24', 33', 50' (3/3) | Referee: Jason Jaftha |

| 3 August 2013 | Falcons | 18–44 | Eastern Province Kings | Barnard Stadium, Kempton Park |
| 14:00 | Try: Anrich Richter 17'; Wesley Roberts 69'; Con: Jaun Kotzé 18' (1/2); Pen: Jaun Kotzé 2' (1/1); Wesley Roberts (0/1); Drop: Jaun Kotzé 46' (1/1) | Scoreboard; Report | Try: Mpho Mbiyozo 14', 35', 76'; Siyanda Grey 65'; Ntabeni Dukisa 80'; Con: Ntabeni Dukisa 15', 36', 66', 77', 80' (5/5); Pen: Ntabeni Dukisa 6', 49', 61' (3/3) | Referee: Jaco Peyper |

| 9 August 2013 | Eastern Province Kings | 9–6 | Border Bulldogs | Nelson Mandela Bay Stadium, Port Elizabeth |
| 19:00 | Pen: Ntabeni Dukisa 36', 71' (2/3); Drop: Ntabeni Dukisa 78' (1/1) | Scoreboard; Report | Pen: Dale Sabbagh 47', 52' (2/3); Drop: Karlo Aspeling (0/1) | Attendance: 400; Referee: Jonathan Kaplan |

| 16 August 2013 | Pumas | 33–32 | Eastern Province Kings | Mbombela Stadium, Mbombela |
| 19:00 | Try: Jacques Momberg 40'; RW Kember 63', 73', 80'; Con: Carl Bezuidenhout 63', 73' (2/4); Pen: Carl Bezuidenhout 22', 44', 65' (3/4) | Scoreboard; Report | Try: Michael Killian 4'; Scott van Breda 28'; Steven Sykes 57'; Tiger Mangweni 60'; Nicolás Vergallo 70'; Con: Scott van Breda (0/2); George Whitehead 60', 70' (2/3); Pen: Scott van Breda 33' (1/2) | Attendance: 2,500; Referee: Marius Jonker |

| 23 August 2013 | Eastern Province Kings | 63–7 | Griffons | Nelson Mandela Bay Stadium, Port Elizabeth |
| 19:00 | Try: Devin Oosthuizen 4'; Tim Agaba 8'; Hannes Franklin 17'; Michael Killian 29'; Wayne Stevens 35', 57'; Thabo Mamojele 42'; Samora Fihlani 71', 76'; Con: Scott van Breda 5', 9', 18', 30', 36', 43', 58', 72', 77' (9/9); Cards: Charl du Plessis (yellow card) 20' to 30' | Scoreboard; Report | Try: Japie Nel 22'; Con: Inus Kritzinger 23' (1/1) | Referee: Marius Jonker |

| 30 August 2013 | Leopards | 26–44 | Eastern Province Kings | Olën Park, Potchefstroom |
| 17:15 | Try: Edgar Marutlulle 3'; Luther Obi 14'; George Tossel 47'; MB Lusaseni 59'; Con: Adriaan Engelbrecht 4', 48', 60' (3/4); Pen: Adriaan Engelbrecht (0/2) | Scoreboard; Report | Try: Cornell du Preez 24'; Samora Fihlani 31'; Michael Killian 38'; Tiger Mangweni 63'; Stefan Willemse 67', 74'; Con: Scott van Breda 32', 39', 64', 75' (4/6); Pen: Scott van Breda 1', 36' (2/2) | Attendance: 1,000; Referee: Tiaan Jonker |

| 6 September 2013 | Eastern Province Kings | 15–9 | SWD Eagles | Nelson Mandela Bay Stadium, Port Elizabeth |
| 19:00 | Pen: Scott van Breda 15', 25', 60', 64', 72' (5/5) | Scoreboard; Report | Pen: Justin van Staden 38', 78' (2/2); Gerrit Smith (0/1); Drop: Justin van Staden 46' (1/1) | Attendance: 3,248; Referee: Lourens van der Merwe |

| 13 September 2013 | Boland Cavaliers | 19–40 | Eastern Province Kings | Boland Stadium, Wellington |
| 16:00 | Try: Jason Kriel 65', 74'; Ulrich Pretorius 77'; Con: Eric Zana 66', 75' (2/2); Jacquin Jansen (0/1); Pen: Ricardo Croy (0/1) | Scoreboard; Report | Try: Michael Killian 5'; Brian Skosana 18' penalty try 29'; Stefan Willemse 42'; Steven Sykes 47'; Cornell du Preez 50'; Con: Scott van Breda 19', 30' (2/2); George Whitehead 43', 48', 51' (3/4); Cards: Scott van Breda (yellow card) 36' to 46'; Kayle van Zyl (yellow card) 71' | Attendance: 800; Referee: Jonathan Kaplan |

| 20 September 2013 | Eastern Province Kings | 30–23 | Falcons | Nelson Mandela Bay Stadium, Port Elizabeth |
| 19:00 | Try: Stefan Willemse 2', 12'; Tiger Mangweni 53'; Con: Scott van Breda 3', 13', 54' (3/3); Pen: Scott van Breda 35', 46', 74' (3/3); Cards: Steven Sykes (yellow card) 29' to 39' | Scoreboard; Report | Try: Sandile Ngcobo 32'; Jaco Oosthuizen 37'; Con: Kyle Hendricks 33', 38' (2/2); Pen: Kyle Hendricks 4', 30', 44' (3/4); Cards: Brendan Rams (yellow card) 58' to 68'; MP van Eeden (yellow card) 76' | Attendance: 2,000; Referee: Jason Jaftha |

| 27 September 2013 | Border Bulldogs | 20–38 | Eastern Province Kings | Buffalo City Stadium, East London |
| 15:00 | Try: Dwayne Jenner 2'; Shane Spring 8'; Con: Dale Sabbagh 3', 9' (2/2); Pen: Dale Sabbagh 25', 40' (2/2); Cards: Dean Muir (yellow card) 20' to 31' | Scoreboard; Report | Try: George Whitehead 13', 20'; Steven Sykes 23'; Darron Nell 28'; Con: Scott van Breda 21', 24', 29' (3/4); Pen: Scott van Breda 48', 51', 64', 73' (4/5); Cards: Devin Oosthuizen (yellow card) 39' to 49' | Referee: Ben Crouse |

| Semi-final | 4 October 2013 | Eastern Province Kings | 32–29 (aet) | Leopards | Nelson Mandela Bay Stadium, Port Elizabeth |
| | 16:30 | Try: Tim Agaba 55'; Kayle van Zyl 95'; Con: Scott van Breda 56', 96' (2/2); Pen: Scott van Breda 3', 7', 32', 60', 77', 93' (6/7); Drop: George Whitehead (0/1) | Scoreboard; Report | Try: Edmar Marais 37'; Tiaan Dorfling 98'; Con: Adriaan Engelbrecht 38', 99' (2/2); Pen: Adriaan Engelbrecht 12', 23', 29', 74', 80' (5/6); Drop: Warren Gilbert (0/1); Cards: SJ Niemand (yellow card) 59' to 70' | Referee: Ben Crouse |

| Final | 11 October 2013 | Pumas | 53–30 | Eastern Province Kings | Mbombela Stadium, Mbombela |
| | 19:10 | Try: RW Kember 18'; Coenie van Wyk 24', 46', 76'; JW Bell 66'; Renaldo Bothma 78'; Con: Carl Bezuidenhout 47', 67' (2/4); JC Roos 77', 79' (2/2); Pen: Carl Bezuidenhout 2', 30', 40', 51', 62' (5/6); Cards: Giant Mtyanda (yellow card) 70'; Doppies le Roux (yellow card) 72' | Scoreboard; Report | Try: Ntabeni Dukisa 54' penalty try 72'; Kayle van Zyl 81'; Con: Scott van Breda 55', 73', 81' (3/3); Pen: Scott van Breda 4', 27', 33' (3/3); Drop: George Whitehead (0/1) | Referee: Craig Joubert |

=== Player statistics ===
The following table shows players statistics for the 2013 Currie Cup season:

Player Statistics – 2013 Currie Cup First Division
| Player | Starts | Used Sub | Unused Sub | Points | Tries | Cons | Pens | DGs | YC | RC |
|---|---|---|---|---|---|---|---|---|---|---|
| Charl du Plessis | 8 | 0 | 0 | 0 | 0 | 0 | 0 | 0 | 1 | 0 |
| Jaco Engels | 2 | 1 | 0 | 0 | 0 | 0 | 0 | 0 | 0 | 0 |
| Ross Geldenhuys | 3 | 4 | 0 | 5 | 1 | 0 | 0 | 0 | 0 | 0 |
| Lizo Gqoboka | 8 | 7 | 0 | 0 | 0 | 0 | 0 | 0 | 0 | 0 |
| Marzuq Maarman | 1 | 0 | 0 | 0 | 0 | 0 | 0 | 0 | 0 | 0 |
| Enoch Mnyaka | 0 | 1 | 1 | 0 | 0 | 0 | 0 | 0 | 0 | 0 |
| Brenden Olivier | 10 | 1 | 0 | 0 | 0 | 0 | 0 | 0 | 0 | 0 |
| Pieter Stemmet | 0 | 1 | 0 | 0 | 0 | 0 | 0 | 0 | 0 | 0 |
| Boetie Britz | 3 | 3 | 2 | 0 | 0 | 0 | 0 | 0 | 0 | 0 |
| Albé de Swardt | 6 | 5 | 1 | 0 | 0 | 0 | 0 | 0 | 0 | 0 |
| Bobby Dyer | 0 | 2 | 0 | 0 | 0 | 0 | 0 | 0 | 0 | 0 |
| Hannes Franklin | 5 | 1 | 0 | 5 | 1 | 0 | 0 | 0 | 0 | 0 |
| Dane van der Westhuyzen | 2 | 2 | 0 | 0 | 0 | 0 | 0 | 0 | 0 | 0 |
| Daniel Adongo | 1 | 0 | 0 | 0 | 0 | 0 | 0 | 0 | 0 | 0 |
| Rynier Bernardo | 2 | 1 | 0 | 0 | 0 | 0 | 0 | 0 | 0 | 0 |
| Samora Fihlani | 9 | 0 | 0 | 15 | 3 | 0 | 0 | 0 | 0 | 0 |
| Darron Nell | 5 | 0 | 0 | 5 | 1 | 0 | 0 | 0 | 0 | 0 |
| Steven Sykes | 6 | 0 | 0 | 15 | 3 | 0 | 0 | 0 | 1 | 0 |
| Wayne van Heerden | 4 | 8 | 0 | 0 | 0 | 0 | 0 | 0 | 0 | 0 |
| Stefan Willemse | 7 | 4 | 1 | 25 | 5 | 0 | 0 | 0 | 0 | 0 |
| Tim Agaba | 9 | 1 | 0 | 10 | 2 | 0 | 0 | 0 | 0 | 0 |
| Thembelani Bholi | 2 | 2 | 0 | 0 | 0 | 0 | 0 | 0 | 0 | 0 |
| Aidon Davis | 3 | 1 | 0 | 10 | 2 | 0 | 0 | 0 | 0 | 0 |
| Dalton Davis | 5 | 0 | 0 | 5 | 1 | 0 | 0 | 0 | 0 | 0 |
| Cornell du Preez | 4 | 0 | 0 | 10 | 2 | 0 | 0 | 0 | 0 | 0 |
| Renier Erasmus | 0 | 1 | 0 | 0 | 0 | 0 | 0 | 0 | 0 | 0 |
| Thabo Mamojele | 2 | 7 | 1 | 5 | 1 | 0 | 0 | 0 | 0 | 0 |
| Mpho Mbiyozo | 8 | 1 | 0 | 30 | 6 | 0 | 0 | 0 | 0 | 0 |
| Kuselo Moyake | 2 | 3 | 1 | 0 | 0 | 0 | 0 | 0 | 0 | 0 |
| Devin Oosthuizen | 9 | 0 | 0 | 5 | 1 | 0 | 0 | 0 | 1 | 0 |
| Stephan Zaayman | 2 | 0 | 0 | 0 | 0 | 0 | 0 | 0 | 0 | 0 |
| Boela Abrahams | 2 | 2 | 1 | 0 | 0 | 0 | 0 | 0 | 0 | 0 |
| Dwayne Kelly | 5 | 5 | 0 | 0 | 0 | 0 | 0 | 0 | 0 | 0 |
| Scott Mathie | 3 | 1 | 0 | 0 | 0 | 0 | 0 | 0 | 0 | 0 |
| Nicolás Vergallo | 5 | 0 | 0 | 5 | 1 | 0 | 0 | 0 | 0 | 0 |
| Wesley Dunlop | 4 | 0 | 0 | 34 | 1 | 4 | 7 | 0 | 0 | 0 |
| Marlou van Niekerk | 2 | 2 | 0 | 7 | 1 | 1 | 0 | 0 | 0 | 0 |
| George Whitehead | 9 | 0 | 0 | 20 | 2 | 5 | 0 | 0 | 0 | 0 |
| Ronnie Cooke | 4 | 0 | 0 | 0 | 0 | 0 | 0 | 0 | 0 | 0 |
| Siyanda Grey | 3 | 0 | 0 | 5 | 1 | 0 | 0 | 0 | 0 | 0 |
| Andile Jho | 1 | 1 | 1 | 0 | 0 | 0 | 0 | 0 | 0 | 0 |
| Tiger Mangweni | 15 | 0 | 0 | 15 | 3 | 0 | 0 | 0 | 0 | 0 |
| Hadleigh Parkes | 2 | 0 | 0 | 5 | 1 | 0 | 0 | 0 | 0 | 0 |
| Brian Skosana | 5 | 5 | 0 | 5 | 1 | 0 | 0 | 0 | 0 | 0 |
| Wayne Stevens | 10 | 4 | 1 | 15 | 3 | 0 | 0 | 0 | 0 | 0 |
| Scott van Breda | 13 | 0 | 0 | 146 | 1 | 27 | 29 | 0 | 1 | 0 |
| Eben Barnard | 3 | 0 | 0 | 0 | 0 | 0 | 0 | 0 | 0 | 0 |
| Michael Killian | 12 | 0 | 0 | 20 | 4 | 0 | 0 | 0 | 0 | 0 |
| Yamkela Ngam | 0 | 0 | 1 | 0 | 0 | 0 | 0 | 0 | 0 | 0 |
| Sergeal Petersen | 1 | 2 | 0 | 0 | 0 | 0 | 0 | 0 | 0 | 0 |
| Marcello Sampson | 3 | 1 | 0 | 0 | 0 | 0 | 0 | 0 | 0 | 0 |
| Siviwe Soyizwapi | 5 | 0 | 0 | 15 | 3 | 0 | 0 | 0 | 0 | 0 |
| Ntabeni Dukisa | 4 | 9 | 3 | 44 | 2 | 5 | 7 | 1 | 0 | 0 |
| Kayle van Zyl | 1 | 8 | 1 | 12 | 2 | 1 | 0 | 0 | 1 | 0 |
| penalty try | — | — | — | 10 | 2 | — | — | — | — | — |

- David Bulbring, Kevin Buys, Demetri Catrakilis, Zolani Faku, Shane Gates, Johan Herbst, Bandise Maku, Siya Mangaliso, SP Marais, Sphephelo Mayaba, Thabiso Mngomezulu, Waylon Murray, Norman Nelson, Foxy Ntleki, Paul Schoeman, Andries Strauss, Wimpie van der Walt, Luke Watson, Andile Witbooi and Madoda Yako were named in the 2013 Currie Cup squad, but never included in a matchday 22.

=== Player Appearances ===
Player Appearances – 2013 Currie Cup First Division
| Player | PMA | GRF | LEO | SWD | BOL | GFA | BDR | PMA | GRF | LEO | SWD | BOL | GFA | BDR | LEO | PMA |
|---|---|---|---|---|---|---|---|---|---|---|---|---|---|---|---|---|
| Lizo Gqoboka | 1 | | 17 (substituted in) | 17 (substituted in) | 17 (substituted in) | 3 | 3 | 3 | 17 (substituted in) | 17 (substituted in) | 17 (substituted in) | 1 | 17 (substituted in) | 1 | 1 | 1 |
| Boetie Britz | 2 | | | 2 | 2 | | 16 (substituted in) | | | 16 | 16 (substituted in) | 16 (substituted in) | | 16 | | |
| Charl du Plessis | 3 | | | | | | | | 3 | 3 | 3 | 3 | | 3 | 3 | 3 |
| Stefan Willemse | 4 | | | 6 | 5 | 6 | | 19 | 6 | 19 (substituted in) | 19 (substituted in) | 6 | 6 | | 19 (substituted in) | 19 (substituted in) |
| Daniel Adongo | 5 | | | | | | | | | | | | | | | |
| Dalton Davis | 6 | 6 | 8 | 8 | 6 | | | | | | | | | | | |
| Kuselo Moyake | 7 | 19 (substituted in) | 7 | | | | 19 (substituted in) | | 19 (substituted in) | | | | 19 | | | |
| Tim Agaba | 8 | | | | | | | 7 | 8 | 7 | 7 | 19 (substituted in) | 8 | 8 | 8 | 8 |
| Dwayne Kelly | 9 | 20 (substituted in) | 20 (substituted in) | 9 | | | | | 20 (substituted in) | 20 (substituted in) | | | 20 (substituted in) | 9 | 9 | 9 |
| Wesley Dunlop | 10 | 10 | 10 | | 10 | | | | | | | | | | | |
| Hadleigh Parkes | 11 | 11 | | | | | | | | | | | | | | |
| Tiger Mangweni | 12 | 12 | 12 | 12 | 12 | | 12 | 12 | 12 | 12 | 12 | 12 | 12 | 12 | 12 | 12 |
| Wayne Stevens | 13 | 13 | 13 | 13 | 13 | | 21 (substituted in) | 22 (substituted in) | 13 | 13 | 13 | 13 | 13 | 22 (substituted in) | 22 | 22 (substituted in) |
| Siviwe Soyizwapi | 14 | 14 | | 15 | 15 | 15 | | | | | | | | | | |
| Scott van Breda | 15 | 15 | 15 | | 14 | | | 15 | 15 | 15 | 15 | 15 | 15 | 15 | 15 | 15 |
| Dane van der Westhuyzen | 16 (substituted in) | 2 | 2 | | | 16 (substituted in) | | | | | | | | | | |
| Brenden Olivier | 17 (substituted in) | 1 | 1 | 1 | 1 | 1 | | 1 | 1 | 1 | 1 | | 1 | | | |
| Aidon Davis | 18 (substituted in) | 8 | | 5 | 8 | | | | | | | | | | | |
| Mpho Mbiyozo | 19 (substituted in) | 7 | | 7 | 7 | 7 | 7 | | | | | | | 7 | 7 | 7 |
| Scott Mathie | 20 (substituted in) | 9 | 9 | | 9 | | | | | | | | | | | |
| Ntabeni Dukisa | 21 (substituted in) | 21 (substituted in) | 14 | 10 | 21 (substituted in) | 10 | 15 | 21 (substituted in) | 21 (substituted in) | 21 (substituted in) | 21 | 21 (substituted in) | 21 | 21 (substituted in) | 21 | 21 (substituted in) |
| Marlou van Niekerk | 22 (substituted in) | | 21 (substituted in) | 14 | | | 10 | | | | | | | | | |
| Ross Geldenhuys | | 3 | 3 | | | | | | | | | 17 (substituted in) | 3 | 17 (substituted in) | 17 (substituted in) | 17 (substituted in) |
| Samora Fihlani | | 4 | 4 | 4 | 4 | 4 | 4 | | 4 | 4 | 4 | | | | | |
| Thabo Mamojele | | 5 | | 19 (substituted in) | | 18 (substituted in) | 18 (substituted in) | | 18 (substituted in) | 18 (substituted in) | 5 | 18 (substituted in) | 18 | 19 (substituted in) | | |
| Albé de Swardt | | 16 (substituted in) | 16 (substituted in) | 16 (substituted in) | 16 (substituted in) | 2 | 2 | 16 | 16 (substituted in) | | | 2 | 2 | 2 | 2 | |
| Pieter Stemmet | | 17 (substituted in) | | | | | | | | | | | | | | |
| Wayne van Heerden | | 19 (substituted in) | 18 (substituted in) | 18 (substituted in) | 18 (substituted in) | 5 | 5 | | | | 18 (substituted in) | 5 | 5 | 18 (substituted in) | 18 (substituted in) | 18 (substituted in) |
| Sergeal Petersen | | 22 (substituted in) | | | | 22 (substituted in) | 14 | | | | | | | | | |
| Rynier Bernardo | | | 5 | | | | | 18 (substituted in) | 5 | | | | | | | |
| Thembelani Bholi | | | 6 | | 19 (substituted in) | 19 (substituted in) | 6 | | | | | | | | | |
| Eben Barnard | | | 11 | 11 | | 11 | | | | | | | | | | |
| Renier Erasmus | | | 19 (substituted in) | | | | | | | | | | | | | |
| Andile Jho | | | 22 (substituted in) | 22 | | 12 | | | | | | | | | | |
| Jaco Engels | | | | 3 | 3 | 17 (substituted in) | | | | | | | | | | |
| Boela Abrahams | | | | 20 (substituted in) | 20 (substituted in) | 9 | 9 | 20 | | | | | | | | |
| Kayle van Zyl | | | | 21 (substituted in) | 22 (substituted in) | 20 (substituted in) | 20 (substituted in) | | | | 20 | 20 (substituted in) | 9 | 20 (substituted in) | 20 (substituted in) | 20 (substituted in) |
| Michael Killian | | | | | 11 | 14 | 11 | 11 | 14 | 14 | 14 | 14 | 14 | 14 | 14 | 14 |
| Stephan Zaayman | | | | | | 8 | 8 | | | | | | | | | |
| Siyanda Grey | | | | | | 13 | 13 | 14 | | | | | | | | |
| Brian Skosana | | | | | | 21 (substituted in) | 22 (substituted in) | | 22 (substituted in) | 22 (substituted in) | 22 (substituted in) | 11 | 11 | 11 | 11 | 11 |
| Marzuq Maarman | | | | | | | 1 | | | | | | | | | |
| Enoch Mnyaka | | | | | | | 17 (substituted in) | 17 | | | | | | | | |
| Hannes Franklin | | | | | | | | 2 | 2 | 2 | 2 | | 16 (substituted in) | | | 2 |
| Darron Nell | | | | | | | | 4 | | 5 | | | | 5 | 5 | 5 |
| Steven Sykes | | | | | | | | 5 | | | | 4 | 4 | 4 | 4 | 4 |
| Devin Oosthuizen | | | | | | | | 6 | 7 | 6 | 6 | 7 | 7 | 6 | 6 | 6 |
| Cornell du Preez | | | | | | | | 8 | | 8 | 8 | 8 | | | | |
| Nicolás Vergallo | | | | | | | | 9 | 9 | 9 | 9 | 9 | | | | |
| George Whitehead | | | | | | | | 10 | 10 | 10 | 10 | 10 | 10 | 10 | 10 | 10 |
| Ronnie Cooke | | | | | | | | 13 | | | | | | 13 | 13 | 13 |
| Marcello Sampson | | | | | | | | | 11 | 11 | 11 | 22 (substituted in) | | | | |
| Yamkela Ngam | | | | | | | | | | | | | 22 | | | |
| Bobby Dyer | | | | | | | | | | | | | | | 16 (substituted in) | 16 (substituted in) |

- David Bulbring, Kevin Buys, Demetri Catrakilis, Zolani Faku, Shane Gates, Johan Herbst, Bandise Maku, Siya Mangaliso, SP Marais, Sphephelo Mayaba, Thabiso Mngomezulu, Waylon Murray, Norman Nelson, Foxy Ntleki, Paul Schoeman, Andries Strauss, Wimpie van der Walt, Luke Watson, Andile Witbooi and Madoda Yako were named in the 2013 Currie Cup squad, but never included in a matchday 22.

== Under-21 Provincial Championship ==
=== Log ===
2013 under-21 provincial championship group B
| Pos | Team | Pld | W | D | L | PF | PA | PD | TF | TA | TB | LB | Pts | Qualification |
|---|---|---|---|---|---|---|---|---|---|---|---|---|---|---|
| 1 | Eastern Province U21 (Q) | 7 | 7 | 0 | 0 | 388 | 110 | +278 | 55 | 15 | 7 | 0 | 35 | Semi-finals |
| 2 | Boland U21 | 7 | 6 | 0 | 1 | 334 | 139 | +195 | 52 | 18 | 6 | 0 | 30 | Semi-finals |
| 3 | Limpopo Blue Bulls U21 | 7 | 5 | 0 | 2 | 284 | 136 | +148 | 44 | 16 | 6 | 2 | 28 | Semi-finals |
| 4 | Griquas U21 | 7 | 3 | 0 | 4 | 159 | 244 | −85 | 22 | 38 | 3 | 2 | 17 | Semi-finals |
| 5 | Griffons U21 | 7 | 3 | 0 | 4 | 156 | 263 | −107 | 21 | 43 | 3 | 0 | 15 | |
| 6 | Falcons U21 | 7 | 2 | 0 | 5 | 156 | 316 | −160 | 24 | 47 | 4 | 1 | 13 | |
| 7 | Pumas U21 | 7 | 2 | 0 | 5 | 156 | 224 | −68 | 22 | 35 | 2 | 1 | 11 | |
| 8 | SWD U21 | 7 | 0 | 0 | 7 | 125 | 326 | −201 | 18 | 46 | 2 | 1 | 3 | |

(Q) Qualified to a promotion play-off game

=== Round-by-round ===
Team Progression – 2013 Under-21 Provincial Championship
| | R1 | R2 | R3 | R4 | R5 | R6 | R7 | SF | F | PR |
|---|---|---|---|---|---|---|---|---|---|---|
| Opposition | PMA | GRF | GRQ | SWD | BOL | FNH | LIM | GRQ | BOL | BDR |
| Cumulative Points | 5 | 10 | 15 | 20 | 25 | 30 | 35 | --- | --- | --- |
| Log Position | 3rd | 2nd | 1st | 1st | 1st | 1st | 1st | --- | --- | --- |
| Key: | win | draw | loss | | | | | | | |

=== Fixtures and results ===
| 16 August 2013 | Pumas U21 | 20–46 | Eastern Province U21 | Mbombela Stadium, Mbombela |
| 16:20 | Try: Johan Pretorius 29'; Dirk Louwies 36'; Pule Sibiya 40'; Con: Juan van der Merwe 36' (1/3); Pen: Juan van der Merwe 11' (1/2) | Scoreboard | Try: Siphesihle Punguzwa 3'; Eben Barnard 10'; Sergeal Petersen 12'; Aidon Davis 25'; Kevin Kaba 47'; Kuhle Sonkosi 53'; Juan Smit 62'; Siviwe Soyizwapi 71'; Con: Marlou van Niekerk 3', 11' (2/5); Shane Gates 62' (1/3); Pen: Shane Gates (0/1) | Attendance: 500; Referee: Pro Legoete |

| 23 August 2013 | Eastern Province U21 | 58–7 | Griffons U21 | Nelson Mandela Bay Stadium, Port Elizabeth |
| 16:15 | Try: Foxy Ntleki 7', 17', 36'; Siviwe Soyizwapi 14', 44'; Ruan Roberts 26'; Marlou van Niekerk 30'; Siphesihle Punguzwa 39'; Aidon Davis 42'; Wayven Smith 67'; Con: Marlou van Niekerk 27', 43' (2/6); Sonwabo Majola 37' (1/3); Juan Smit 68' (1/1); Cards: Pieter Stemmet (yellow card) 61' to 71' | Scoreboard | Try: Wayne Ludick 79'; Con: Ryno Venter 80' (1/1); Cards: Thembelani Mabomba (yellow card) 47' to 57'; Wayne Ludick (yellow card) 57' to 67'; Brain Meyer (yellow card) 65' to 75' | Attendance: 500; Referee: Pro Legoete |

| 31 August 2013 | Griquas U21 | 0–53 | Eastern Province U21 | Griqua Park, Kimberley |
| 13:30 | Pen: Jonty George Gray (0/2); Cards: Johann Strauss (yellow card) 30' to 40' | Scoreboard | Try: Sonwabo Majola 19', 68'; Marlou van Niekerk 22'; Wayven Smith 30'; Claude Tshidibi 47'; Aidon Davis 53'; Aya Dlepu 56'; Brendan Hector 81'; Con: Ruan Allerston 20', 23', 47', 57', 82' (5/8); Pen: Ruan Allerston 12' (1/1); Cards: Claude Tshidibi (yellow card) 63' to 73' | Attendance: 50; Referee: Gerrie de Bruin |

| 6 September 2013 | Eastern Province U21 | 76–16 | SWD U21 | Nelson Mandela Bay Stadium, Port Elizabeth |
| 16:30 | Try: Eben Barnard 15', 26'; Vukile Sofisa 23', 56'; Sonwabo Majola 30'; Aya Dlepu 41', 48'; Marlou van Niekerk 59'; Siphesihle Punguzwa 62', 75'; Siviwe Soyizwapi 70', 79'; Con: Shane Gates 24', 31' (2/5); Marlou van Niekerk 49' (1/1); Ruan Allerston 57', 60', 63', 71', 80' (5/6); Pen: Shane Gates (0/1) | Scoreboard | Try: Dillin Christo-Lee Snel 37'; Con: Chris Willemse 38' (1/1); Pen: Chris Willemse 1', 8', 25' (3/3); Cards: Linden Edward Rhode (yellow card) 22' to 32' | Referee: Ben Crouse |

| 13 September 2013 | Boland U21 | 17–31 | Eastern Province U21 | Boland Stadium, Wellington |
| 13:30 | Try: Johann Stephanus Alberts Lambrechts 19'; Kirwan Horsemend 42', 80'; Con: Ashley Esau 43' (1/2); Sherwin Clyde Dyson (0/1); Cards: Wade Schoor (yellow card) 48' to 58'; Conway Pretorius (yellow card) 78' | Scoreboard | Try: Marlou van Niekerk 5', 17'; Siviwe Soyizwapi 34'; Aidon Davis 52'; Con: Ruan Allerston 6', 18', 35', 53' (4/4); Pen: Ruan Allerston 32' (1/2) | Attendance: 380; Referee: Jaco Kotze |

| 20 September 2013 | Eastern Province U21 | 87–17 | Falcons U21 | Nelson Mandela Bay Stadium, Port Elizabeth |
| 16:30 | Try: Kuhle Sonkosi 5'; Sphu Msutwana 8'; Eben Barnard 30', 37'; Wayven Smith 32'; Siviwe Soyizwapi 34', 43'; Siphesihle Punguzwa 39', 49'; Sonwabo Majola 68', 80'; Yakha Qinela 74'; Shane Gates 76'; Con: Ruan Allerston 6', 9', 31', 33', 38', 40', 44', 50' (8/9); Gavin Hauptfleisch 75', 77', 80' (3/4) | Scoreboard | Try: Daymin Brendon Jansen van Vuuren 57'; Friedle Olivier 78'; Con: Paul Walters 58', 79' (2/2); Pen: Paul Walters (0/1); Drop: Deon Steve Robert Hendrikz 10' (1/1); Cards: Mandla Mdaka (yellow card) 27' to 38' | Attendance: 500; Referee: Sindile Mayende |

| 28 September 2013 | Limpopo Blue Bulls U21 | 33–37 | Eastern Province U21 | Groblersdal |
| 16:00 | Try: Pieter Jan Kruger 1'; Oskar Jan Maximillian Calitz 8'; Bernthardt John Richard Gerntholtz 14'; Werner van Heese 38'; Daniel Hart 53'; Con: Marcel Enslen Steyn Scholtz 9', 15', 39', 54' (4/5); Pen: Marcel Enslen Steyn Scholtz (0/1); Cards: Barend Jakobus Erasmus Wessels (yellow card) 34' to 44'; Donovan Harry O'Grady (yellow card) 60' to 70' | Scoreboard | Try: Shane Gates 22'; Siphesihle Punguzwa 30'; Aidon Davis 42'; Sinethemba Ndita 61'; Con: Ruan Allerston 23', 31', 43', 62' (4/4); Pen: Ruan Allerston 11', 70' (2/2); Andile Jho 79' (1/1); Cards: Claude Tshidibi (yellow card) 13' to 23' | Attendance: 100; Referee: Matt Kemp |

| Semi-final | 4 October 2013 | Eastern Province U21 | 44–26 | Griquas U21 | Nelson Mandela Bay Stadium, Port Elizabeth |
| | 16:30 | Try: Wayven Smith 17', 27', 43', 53'; Siviwe Soyizwapi 69'; Con: Ruan Allerston 18', 28', 44', 54' (4/4); Gavin Hauptfleisch 70' (1/1); Pen: Ruan Allerston 14', 49', 63' (3/4); Cards: Aidon Davis (yellow card) 78'; Siphesihle Punguzwa (yellow card) 80' | Scoreboard | Try: Nicolaas Steyn 39'; Johann Strauss 67'; Stephan Steyn 72'; Renier Botha 80'; Con: Jonty George Gray (0/4); Pen: Jonty George Gray 11', 35' (2/3); Cards: Ceagan Allan van der Linde (yellow card) 63' to 74' | Attendance: 100; Referee: Stephan Geldenhuys |

| Final | 11 October 2013 | Eastern Province U21 | 59–19 | Boland U21 | Mbombela Stadium, Mbombela |
| | 16:15 | Try: Claude Tshidibi 18'; Brenden Olivier 38'; Kuhle Sonkosi 53'; Siviwe Soyizwapi 57'; Ivan Ludick 62'; Sphu Msutwana 66'; Siphesihle Punguzwa 72'; Dane van der Westhuyzen 79'; Con: Ruan Allerston 39', 54', 58' (3/4); Marlou van Niekerk 67' (1/2); Gavin Hauptfleisch 80' (1/2); Pen: Ruan Allerston 10', 46', 51' (3/3); Drop: Ruan Allerston (0/1) | Scoreboard | Try: Conway Pretorius 77'; Con: Ashley Esau 78' (1/1); Pen: Ashley Esau 4', 7', 40', 49' (4/5); Cards: Conway Pretorius (yellow card) 24' to 34'; Ernst Claassen (yellow card) 58' to 68'; Thurlow Marsh (yellow card) 69' |

| Promotion/Relegation | 19 October 2013 | Border U21 | 23–21 | Eastern Province U21 | Buffalo City Stadium, East London |
| | 13:00 | Try: Ernst Ladendorf 5'; Marlyn Williams 13'; Dillon Smit 34'; Con: Shaun Nieuwenhuyzen 35' (1/3); Pen: Shaun Nieuwenhuyzen 2' (1/1); Angus Cleophas 83' (1/2); Cards: Stephan Deyzel (yellow card) 38' to 48' | Scoreboard | Try: Siphesihle Punguzwa 49'; Marlou van Niekerk 59'; Siviwe Soyizwapi 68'; Con: Ruan Allerston (0/1); Gavin Hauptfleisch (0/2); Pen: Ruan Allerston 28' (1/1); Gavin Hauptfleisch 66' (1/1); Marlou van Niekerk (0/1); Cards: Claude Tshidibi (yellow card) 47' to 58' | Attendance: 200 |

=== Players ===
The following players played during the 2013 Under-21 Provincial Championship Division B season:

2013 Eastern Province Kings Under-21 Provincial Championship squad
Forwards
- Aidon Davis
- Brendan Hector
- Ben Jacobs
- Kevin Kaba
- Marzuq Maarman
- Enoch Mnyaka
- Sinethemba Ndita
- Brenden Olivier
- Siphesihle Punguzwa
- Yakha Qinela
- Ruan Roberts
- Wayven Smith
- Vukile Sofisa
- Kuhle Sonkosi
- Pieter Stemmet
- Claude Tshidibi
- Dane van der Westhuyzen
- Stefan Willemse
- Stephan Zaayman
Backs
- Ruan Allerston
- Eben Barnard
- Ofentse Boloko
- Aya Dlepu
- Shane Gates
- Gavin Hauptfleisch
- Andile Jho
- Bangi Kobese
- Ivan Ludick
- Sonwabo Majola
- Wandile Mbambeni
- Sphu Msutwana
- Foxy Ntleki
- Sergeal Petersen
- Juan Smit
- Siviwe Soyizwapi
- Marlou van Niekerk
DNP
- Chad Banfield
- Dylan Samuel Beckett
- Jaco Bernardo
- Masixole Caga
- Frans Antonie Gerber
- Arnold Klein
- Glenwill Lewis
- Ntsiki Mlamleli
- Tau Mokonenyane
- Khaya Molotana
- Zuko Ndlela
- Rousseau Prinsloo
- Tyrone Rankin
- Paul Schoeman
Coach
Robbi Kempson

=== Player statistics ===
The following table shows players statistics for the 2013 Under-21 Provincial Championship season:

Player Statistics – 2013 Under-21 Provincial Championship
| Player | Starts | Used Sub | Unused Sub | Points | Tries | Cons | Pens | DGs | YC | RC |
|---|---|---|---|---|---|---|---|---|---|---|
| Marzuq Maarman | 1 | 2 | 0 | 0 | 0 | 0 | 0 | 0 | 0 | 0 |
| Enoch Mnyaka | 2 | 1 | 0 | 0 | 0 | 0 | 0 | 0 | 0 | 0 |
| Brenden Olivier | 3 | 1 | 0 | 5 | 1 | 0 | 0 | 0 | 0 | 0 |
| Vukile Sofisa | 9 | 0 | 1 | 10 | 2 | 0 | 0 | 0 | 0 | 0 |
| Pieter Stemmet | 5 | 4 | 1 | 0 | 0 | 0 | 0 | 0 | 1 | 0 |
| Yakha Qinela | 0 | 3 | 1 | 5 | 1 | 0 | 0 | 0 | 0 | 0 |
| Ruan Roberts | 1 | 6 | 0 | 5 | 1 | 0 | 0 | 0 | 0 | 0 |
| Dane van der Westhuyzen | 9 | 0 | 0 | 5 | 1 | 0 | 0 | 0 | 0 | 0 |
| Brendan Hector | 0 | 4 | 1 | 5 | 1 | 0 | 0 | 0 | 0 | 0 |
| Ben Jacobs | 2 | 1 | 0 | 0 | 0 | 0 | 0 | 0 | 0 | 0 |
| Kevin Kaba | 6 | 1 | 0 | 5 | 1 | 0 | 0 | 0 | 0 | 0 |
| Kuhle Sonkosi | 9 | 0 | 0 | 15 | 3 | 0 | 0 | 0 | 0 | 0 |
| Aidon Davis | 9 | 0 | 0 | 25 | 5 | 0 | 0 | 0 | 1 | 0 |
| Sinethemba Ndita | 0 | 2 | 0 | 5 | 1 | 0 | 0 | 0 | 0 | 0 |
| Siphesihle Punguzwa | 5 | 5 | 0 | 45 | 9 | 0 | 0 | 0 | 1 | 0 |
| Wayven Smith | 6 | 3 | 0 | 35 | 7 | 0 | 0 | 0 | 0 | 0 |
| Claude Tshidibi | 10 | 0 | 0 | 10 | 2 | 0 | 0 | 0 | 3 | 0 |
| Stefan Willemse | 1 | 0 | 0 | 0 | 0 | 0 | 0 | 0 | 0 | 0 |
| Stephan Zaayman | 2 | 3 | 0 | 0 | 0 | 0 | 0 | 0 | 0 | 0 |
| Bangi Kobese | 1 | 0 | 1 | 0 | 0 | 0 | 0 | 0 | 0 | 0 |
| Ivan Ludick | 5 | 1 | 0 | 5 | 1 | 0 | 0 | 0 | 0 | 0 |
| Sonwabo Majola | 4 | 6 | 0 | 27 | 5 | 1 | 0 | 0 | 0 | 0 |
| Wandile Mbambeni | 0 | 2 | 0 | 0 | 0 | 0 | 0 | 0 | 0 | 0 |
| Ruan Allerston | 7 | 1 | 0 | 99 | 0 | 33 | 11 | 0 | 0 | 0 |
| Gavin Hauptfleisch | 0 | 6 | 0 | 13 | 0 | 5 | 1 | 0 | 0 | 0 |
| Marlou van Niekerk | 8 | 0 | 0 | 42 | 6 | 6 | 0 | 0 | 0 | 0 |
| Jaco Bernardo | 0 | 0 | 1 | 0 | 0 | 0 | 0 | 0 | 0 | 0 |
| Shane Gates | 8 | 0 | 0 | 16 | 2 | 3 | 0 | 0 | 0 | 0 |
| Andile Jho | 7 | 2 | 1 | 3 | 0 | 0 | 1 | 0 | 0 | 0 |
| Foxy Ntleki | 1 | 2 | 0 | 15 | 3 | 0 | 0 | 0 | 0 | 0 |
| Juan Smit | 0 | 3 | 0 | 7 | 1 | 1 | 0 | 0 | 0 | 0 |
| Eben Barnard | 10 | 0 | 0 | 30 | 6 | 0 | 0 | 0 | 0 | 0 |
| Ofentse Boloko | 2 | 1 | 0 | 0 | 0 | 0 | 0 | 0 | 0 | 0 |
| Aya Dlepu | 3 | 1 | 0 | 15 | 3 | 0 | 0 | 0 | 0 | 0 |
| Sergeal Petersen | 1 | 0 | 0 | 5 | 1 | 0 | 0 | 0 | 0 | 0 |
| Sphu Msutwana | 3 | 2 | 0 | 5 | 1 | 0 | 0 | 0 | 0 | 0 |
| Siviwe Soyizwapi | 10 | 0 | 0 | 55 | 11 | 0 | 0 | 0 | 0 | 0 |

- Chad Banfield, Dylan Samuel Beckett, Masixole Caga, Frans Antonie Gerber, Arnold Klein, Glenwill Lewis, Ntsiki Mlamleli, Tau Mokonenyane, Khaya Molotana, Zuko Ndlela, Rousseau Prinsloo, Tyrone Rankin and Paul Schoeman were named in the 2013 Under-21 Provincial Championship squad, but never included in a matchday 22.

=== Player Appearances ===
Player Appearances – 2013 Under-21 Provincial Championship
| Player | PMA | GRF | GRQ | SWD | BOL | FNH | LIM | GRQ | BOL | BDR |
|---|---|---|---|---|---|---|---|---|---|---|
| Marzuq Maarman | 1 | | 17 (substituted in) | | | 17 (substituted in) | | | | |
| Dane van der Westhuyzen | 2 | | 2 | 2 | 2 | 2 | 2 | 2 | 2 | 2 |
| Pieter Stemmet | 3 | 17 (substituted in) | 3 | 17 (substituted in) | 3 | 3 | 17 | 17 (substituted in) | 17 (substituted in) | 3 |
| Kuhle Sonkosi | 4 | 4 | 4 | | 4 | 4 | 4 | 4 | 4 | 4 |
| Kevin Kaba | 5 | 5 | | | 18 (substituted in) | | 5 | 5 | 5 | 8 |
| Siphesihle Punguzwa | 6 | 6 | 19 (substituted in) | 19 (substituted in) | 6 | 6 | 6 | 19 (substituted in) | 19 (substituted in) | 19 (substituted in) |
| Claude Tshidibi | 7 | 7 | 7 | 5 | 5 | 5 | 7 | 7 | 7 | 7 |
| Aidon Davis | 8 | 8 | 8 | 8 | 8 | 8 | 8 | 8 | 8 | |
| Bangi Kobese | 9 | | | | | | | | | 20 |
| Marlou van Niekerk | 10 | 10 | 13 | 13 | 13 | | 13 | | 13 | 13 |
| Eben Barnard | 11 | 11 | 11 | 11 | 11 | 14 | 14 | 14 | 14 | 14 |
| Shane Gates | 12 | | | 10 | 12 | 12 | 12 | 12 | 12 | 12 |
| Andile Jho | 13 | 12 | 12 | 12 | 21 | 13 | 22 (substituted in) | 13 | 21 (substituted in) | 11 |
| Sergeal Petersen | 14 | | | | | | | | | |
| Siviwe Soyizwapi | 15 | 15 | 15 | 15 | 15 | 15 | 15 | 15 | 15 | 15 |
| Ruan Roberts | 16 (substituted in) | 2 | 16 (substituted in) | 16 (substituted in) | 16 (substituted in) | | | | 16 (substituted in) | 16 (substituted in) |
| Vukile Sofisa | 17 | 1 | 1 | 1 | 1 | 1 | 3 | 3 | 3 | 1 |
| Ben Jacobs | 18 (substituted in) | | 5 | 4 | | | | | | |
| Wayven Smith | 19 (substituted in) | 19 (substituted in) | 6 | 6 | 19 (substituted in) | 7 | | 6 | 6 | 6 |
| Sonwabo Majola | 20 (substituted in) | 9 | 9 | 9 | 20 (substituted in) | 20 (substituted in) | 20 (substituted in) | 20 (substituted in) | 20 (substituted in) | 9 |
| Ofentse Boloko | 21 (substituted in) | 14 | | | | | 11 | | | |
| Juan Smit | 22 (substituted in) | 22 (substituted in) | 22 (substituted in) | | | | | | | |
| Enoch Mnyaka | | 3 | | 3 | | | | | | 17 (substituted in) |
| Foxy Ntleki | | 13 | | | | 22 (substituted in) | | 22 (substituted in) | | |
| Yakha Qinela | | 16 (substituted in) | | | | 16 (substituted in) | 16 | 16 (substituted in) | | |
| Stephan Zaayman | | 18 (substituted in) | | 7 | 7 | | | 18 (substituted in) | 18 (substituted in) | |
| Wandile Mbambeni | | 20 (substituted in) | 20 (substituted in) | | | | | | | |
| Aya Dlepu | | 21 (substituted in) | 14 | 14 | 14 | | | | | |
| Ruan Allerston | | | 10 | 21 (substituted in) | 10 | 10 | 10 | 10 | 10 | 10 |
| Brendan Hector | | | 18 (substituted in) | 18 (substituted in) | | 18 (substituted in) | 18 (substituted in) | | | 18 |
| Sphu Msutwana | | | 21 (substituted in) | 22 (substituted in) | | 11 | | 11 | 11 | |
| Ivan Ludick | | | | 20 (substituted in) | 9 | 9 | 9 | 9 | 9 | |
| Brenden Olivier | | | | | 17 (substituted in) | | 1 | 1 | 1 | |
| Gavin Hauptfleisch | | | | | 22 (substituted in) | 21 (substituted in) | 21 (substituted in) | 21 (substituted in) | 22 (substituted in) | 21 (substituted in) |
| Sinethemba Ndita | | | | | | 19 (substituted in) | 19 (substituted in) | | | |
| Stefan Willemse | | | | | | | | | | 5 |
| Jaco Bernardo | | | | | | | | | | 22 |

- Chad Banfield, Dylan Samuel Beckett, Masixole Caga, Frans Antonie Gerber, Arnold Klein, Glenwill Lewis, Ntsiki Mlamleli, Tau Mokonenyane, Khaya Molotana, Zuko Ndlela, Rousseau Prinsloo, Tyrone Rankin and Paul Schoeman were named in the 2013 Under-21 Provincial Championship squad, but never included in a matchday 22.

== Under-19 Provincial Championship ==
=== Log ===
2013 Under-19 Provincial Championship Division B Table
| Pos | Team | Pld | W | D | L | PF | PA | PD | TF | TA | TB | LB | Pts | Qualification |
|---|---|---|---|---|---|---|---|---|---|---|---|---|---|---|
| 1 | Falcons U19 | 7 | 7 | 0 | 0 | 267 | 151 | +116 | 37 | 20 | 6 | 0 | 34 | Semi-finals |
| 2 | Boland U19 | 7 | 5 | 0 | 2 | 180 | 169 | +11 | 27 | 23 | 5 | 0 | 25 | Semi-finals |
| 3 | Eastern Province U19 (O) | 7 | 4 | 0 | 3 | 213 | 164 | +49 | 33 | 22 | 5 | 2 | 23 | Promotion play-off Semi-finals |
| 4 | SWD U19 | 7 | 4 | 0 | 3 | 199 | 167 | +32 | 24 | 25 | 3 | 1 | 20 | Semi-finals |
| 5 | Griffons U19 | 7 | 3 | 0 | 4 | 187 | 229 | −42 | 23 | 32 | 3 | 2 | 17 | |
| 6 | Limpopo Blue Bulls U19 | 7 | 2 | 0 | 5 | 209 | 190 | +19 | 32 | 23 | 3 | 3 | 14 | |
| 7 | Griquas U19 | 7 | 3 | 0 | 4 | 171 | 188 | −17 | 22 | 26 | 3 | 2 | 8 (Note: Griquas U19 were deducted 9 points for fielding an unregistered player.) | |
| 8 | Pumas U19 | 7 | 0 | 0 | 7 | 108 | 276 | −168 | 14 | 41 | 0 | 1 | 1 | |

Rules for classification:
- 4 points for a win
- 2 points for a draw
- 1 bonus point for a loss by seven points or less
- 1 bonus point for scoring four or more tries in a match
(O) Qualified for the promotion play-off game

=== Round-by-round ===
Team Progression – 2013 Under-19 Provincial Championship
| Team | R1 | R2 | R3 | R4 | R5 | R6 | R7 | SF | F | PR |
|---|---|---|---|---|---|---|---|---|---|---|
| Opposition | PMA | GRF | GRQ | SWD | BOL | FNH | LIM | BOL | FNH | BDR |
| Cumulative Points | 5 | 10 | 15 | 15 | 17 | 19 | 23 | --- | --- | --- |
| Log Position | 1st | 1st | 1st | 2nd | 3rd | 3rd | 3rd | --- | --- | --- |
| Key: | win | draw | loss | | | | | | | |

=== Fixtures and results ===
| 16 August 2013 | Pumas U19 | 18–46 | Eastern Province U19 | Mbombela Stadium, Mbombela |
| 14:30 | Try: Juandre Enslin van Wyk 24'; Marthinus Philippus Snyman 43'; Con: Juandre Enslin van Wyk 24' (1/2); Pen: Marthinus Philippus Snyman 34' (1/1); Juandre Enslin van Wyk 47' (1/1) | Scoreboard | Try: Stephan Ebersohn 13'; Sherwin Slater 25'; Khanya Mzilikazi 30'; Warren Swarts 32'; Gerrit Huisamen 52'; John-Henry Schmitt 55'; Khaya Molotana 65'; Con: Warren Swarts 33' (1/4); Matthew Moore 52' (1/1); Mitchell Turner 66' (1/1) | Attendance: 250; Referee: Tahla Ntshakaza |

| 23 August 2013 | Eastern Province U19 | 42–20 | Griffons U19 | Nelson Mandela Bay Stadium, Port Elizabeth |
| 14:15 | Try: Khaya Malotana 4'; Lyle Lombaard 26'; JP Jamieson 30'; Juandré Fourie 36'; Francois Nel 48'; John-Henry Schmitt 58'; Con: Warren Swarts 5', 27', 31', 37', 49', 59' (6/6) | Scoreboard | Try: Gerrit Otto 8'; Deon Taljaard 69'; Con: Deon Taljaard 9', 70' (2/2); Pen: Deon Taljaard 28', 35' (2/4) | Referee: Francois Pretorius |

| 31 August 2013 | Griquas U19 | 7–26 | Eastern Province U19 | Griqua Park, Kimberley |
| 12:00 | Try: Bjorn Dennis van Wyk 53'; Con: Stefan Erns Schutte 53' (1/); Pen: Christo Coetzee (0/3); Cards: Jacques van Zyl (yellow card) 48' to 58' | Scoreboard | Try: Khanya Mzilikazi 24'; Matthew Moore 42'; Francois van der Walt 50'; Warren Swarts 56'; Con: Warren Swarts 24', 42' (2/2); Alex Banfield 50' (1/2) | Referee: Oregopotse Rametsi |

| 6 September 2013 | Eastern Province U19 | 10–35 | SWD U19 | Nelson Mandela Bay Stadium, Port Elizabeth |
| 14:30 | Try: Kevin Kaba 53', 62'; Con: Alex Banfield (0/2); Cards: Stephan Ebersohn (yellow card) 59' | Scoreboard | Try: Dean Peter January 40'; Macdelin Saayman 50'; Curtley Duwayne Kiewiet 64'; Leighton Eksteen 67'; Con: Leighton Eksteen 51', 65', 68' (3/4); Pen: Elfrido Ayford 24' (1/2); Leighton Eksteen 58' (1/1); Drop: Macdelin Saayman 32' (1/1) | Referee: Ricus van der Hoven |

| 13 September 2013 | Boland U19 | 26–24 | Eastern Province U19 | Boland Stadium, Wellington |
| 12:00 | Try: Anzo John Stubbs 3'; Kennedy Sithsaba Rorwana 7'; Willbur Boonzaaier 45'; Louis Carstens 61'; Con: Willbur Boonzaaier 4', 8' (2/3); Valentino Wellman 62' (1/1) | Scoreboard | Try: Kuhle Mbiko 11'; Dewald Meyer 49'; Francois Nel 57', 67'; Con: Alex Banfield 50' (1/2); Mitchell Turner 58' (1/2); Pen: Alex Banfield (0/1); Cards: Khaya Malotana (yellow card) 41' to 51' | Referee: Tahla Ntshakaza |

| 20 September 2013 | Eastern Province U19 | 39–41 | Falcons U19 | Nelson Mandela Bay Stadium, Port Elizabeth |
| 14:30 | Try: Matthew Moore 22'; Kevin Kaba 29'; Juandré Fourie 43'; Alex Banfield 67'; Con: Selvyn Davids 23', 29', 35', 68' (4/5); Juandré Fourie 43' (1/1); Pen: Selvyn Davids 5', 57' (2/2); Warren Swartz 56' (1/1); Cards: JP Jamieson (yellow card) 69' | Scoreboard | Try: Dominic Cloete 14', 55'; Ruan Ernst 24'; Charlton Anderson 30'; Jaques Frederick Malan 33'; Divan Johannes Binneman 60'; Con: Matthys Cornelius Venter 31', 55', 61', 65' (4/6); Pen: Matthys Cornelius Venter 71' (1/1); Drop: Matthys Cornelius Venter (0/1); Cards: Jeandré Roux (yellow card) 20' to 31' | Attendance: 1,000; Referee: Eduan Nel |

| 28 September 2013 | Limpopo Blue Bulls U19 | 17–26 | Eastern Province U19 | Groblersdal |
| 14:00 | Try: Stephanus Smith 25'; Willie Henry Dreyer Lloyd 42'; Wade Worthington 68'; Con: Casper Jan Hendrik du Plessis 43' (1/2); Kean Henning Dry (0/1) | Scoreboard | Try: Khaya Molotana 35'; Wayburn Howley 56'; Juandré Fourie 64'; Con: Francois Nel (0/1); Jason Baggott 65' (1/2); Pen: Jason Baggott 6', 20', 41' (3/3); Francois Nel (0/1) | Attendance: 100; Referee: Stephan Geldenhuys |

| Semi-final | 4 October 2013 | Boland U19 | 30–45 | Eastern Province U19 | Boland Stadium, Wellington |
| | 14:00 | Try: Francois Daniel Pienaar 38'; Deno-Chaunzey Lee-Trevino van Turha 67'; Anzo John Stubbs 23', 36'; Con: Willbur Boonzaaier 24', 37' (2/3); Anzo John Stubbs (0/1); Pen: Willbur Boonzaaier 14', 31' (2/2) | Scoreboard | Try: Juandré Fourie 8'; Sergeal Petersen 11', 26'; Alex Banfield 35'; Khaya Molotana 55'; Selvyn Davids 64'; Con: Selvyn Davids 9', 12', 27', 35', 56', 65' (6/6); Pen: Alex Banfield 1' (1/1) | Attendance: 200; Referee: Jaco Pretorius |

| Final | 11 October 2013 | Falcons U19 | 40–56 | Eastern Province U19 | Mbombela Stadium, Mbombela |
| | 14:20 | Try: Marthinus Phillipus Ueckermann 19'; Jean-Claude van Zyl 38'; Andries Stefanus Schutte 52'; Franswa Ueckermann 60'; Con: Matthys Cornelius Venter 20', 38', 52', 61' (4/4); Pen: Matthys Cornelius Venter 9', 13' (2/2); Drop: Matthys Cornelius Venter 17', 64' (2/2) | Scoreboard | Try: Selvyn Davids 3', 34', 71'; Matthew Moore 10'; Khaya Malotana 28', 62', 64'; Sergeal Petersen 35'; Con: Selvyn Davids 11', 29', 34', 65', 72' (5/8); Pen: Selvyn Davids 50', 68' (2/2) | Attendance: 245 |

| Promotion/Relegation | 19 October 2013 | Border U19 | 20–27 | Eastern Province U19 | Buffalo City Stadium, East London |
| | 11:00 | Try: Oliver Cracknell 2'; Dylan Rust 32'; Charl Werner Swanepoel 63'; Con: Werner Barnard 33' (1/3); Pen: Werner Barnard 5' (1/1); Drop: Werner Barnard (0/1); Cards: Dylan Rust (yellow card) 44' to 55'; Athenkosi Mabinda (yellow card) 54' to 64' | Scoreboard | Try: Sergeal Petersen 15'; Sherwin Slater 41'; Alex Banfield 46'; Con: Selvyn Davids 16', 42', 47' (3/3); Pen: Selvyn Davids 36', 69' (2/5); Alex Banfield (0/2); Cards: Similile Qinela (red card) 54'; JP Jamieson (yellow card) 54' to 64' | Attendance: 150 |

=== Players ===
The following players played during the 2013 Under-19 Provincial Championship Division B season:

2013 Eastern Province Kings Under-19 Provincial Championship squad
| Forwards | Bathandwa Cafu • Ruan de Jager • Stephan Ebersohn • Jonathan Ford • Pelser Hanekom • Gerrit Huisamen • JP Jamieson • Kevin Kaba • Lyle Lombaard • Dewald Meyer • Matthew Moore • David Murray • Divan Nell • Tyler Paul • Similile Qinela • Sabelo Sam • John-Henry Schmitt • Erwin Slabbert • Francois van der Walt • |
| Backs | Matthew Alborough • Jason Baggott • Alex Banfield • Siviwe Bisset • Luca Dalla-Vecchia • Selvyn Davids • Ethan Fortuin • Juandré Fourie • Wayburn Howley • Roger Louis • Kuhle Mbiko • Phelo Mfini • Khaya Molotana • Mario Mowers • Khanya Mzilikazi • Francois Nel • Luan Nieuwoudt • Sergeal Petersen • Sherwin Slater • Warren Swarts • Mitchell Turner • |
| DNP | Darrel Curtis Coetzee • Justin Ferrant • Darren Ketzner • Mvelo Khumalo • Sokhana Mpemba • Wynand van der Merwe • Estiaan van der Westhuizen • Devon Chistopher van Eyck • Sean van Zyl • CJ Velleman • Hendrik Stephanus Venter |
| Coach | Ryan Felix |

=== Player statistics ===
The following table shows players statistics for the 2013 Under-19 Provincial Championship season:

Player Statistics – 2013 Under-19 Provincial Championship
| Player | Starts | Used Sub | Unused Sub | Points | Tries | Cons | Pens | DGs | YC | RC |
|---|---|---|---|---|---|---|---|---|---|---|
| Ruan de Jager | 0 | 1 | 2 | 0 | 0 | 0 | 0 | 0 | 0 | 0 |
| Mvelo Khumalo | 0 | 0 | 3 | 0 | 0 | 0 | 0 | 0 | 0 | 0 |
| Lyle Lombaard | 5 | 0 | 0 | 5 | 1 | 0 | 0 | 0 | 0 | 0 |
| Matthew Moore | 10 | 0 | 0 | 17 | 3 | 1 | 0 | 0 | 0 | 0 |
| David Murray | 5 | 0 | 1 | 0 | 0 | 0 | 0 | 0 | 0 | 0 |
| Similile Qinela | 0 | 5 | 4 | 0 | 0 | 0 | 0 | 0 | 0 | 1 |
| JP Jamieson | 7 | 0 | 1 | 5 | 1 | 0 | 0 | 0 | 2 | 0 |
| Jonathan Ford | 0 | 3 | 1 | 0 | 0 | 0 | 0 | 0 | 0 | 0 |
| Divan Nell | 0 | 1 | 3 | 0 | 0 | 0 | 0 | 0 | 0 | 0 |
| John-Henry Schmitt | 8 | 1 | 1 | 10 | 2 | 0 | 0 | 0 | 0 | 0 |
| Stephan Ebersohn | 8 | 1 | 0 | 10 | 2 | 0 | 0 | 0 | 1 | 0 |
| Pelser Hanekom | 1 | 2 | 0 | 0 | 0 | 0 | 0 | 0 | 0 | 0 |
| Gerrit Huisamen | 7 | 0 | 0 | 5 | 1 | 0 | 0 | 0 | 0 | 0 |
| Tyler Paul | 8 | 0 | 0 | 0 | 0 | 0 | 0 | 0 | 0 | 0 |
| Francois van der Walt | 1 | 2 | 1 | 5 | 1 | 0 | 0 | 0 | 0 | 0 |
| Bathandwa Cafu | 2 | 1 | 3 | 0 | 0 | 0 | 0 | 0 | 0 | 0 |
| Dewald Meyer | 1 | 5 | 3 | 5 | 1 | 0 | 0 | 0 | 0 | 0 |
| Sokhana Mpemba | 0 | 0 | 3 | 0 | 0 | 0 | 0 | 0 | 0 | 0 |
| Sabelo Sam | 4 | 0 | 0 | 0 | 0 | 0 | 0 | 0 | 0 | 0 |
| Erwin Slabbert | 10 | 0 | 0 | 0 | 0 | 0 | 0 | 0 | 0 | 0 |
| Kevin Kaba | 3 | 0 | 0 | 15 | 3 | 0 | 0 | 0 | 0 | 0 |
| Matthew Alborough | 2 | 0 | 0 | 0 | 0 | 0 | 0 | 0 | 0 | 0 |
| Jason Baggott | 5 | 1 | 0 | 11 | 0 | 1 | 3 | 0 | 0 | 0 |
| Roger Louis | 1 | 0 | 3 | 0 | 0 | 0 | 0 | 0 | 0 | 0 |
| Mario Mowers | 0 | 1 | 0 | 0 | 0 | 0 | 0 | 0 | 0 | 0 |
| Francois Nel | 3 | 4 | 1 | 15 | 3 | 0 | 0 | 0 | 0 | 0 |
| Warren Swarts | 5 | 1 | 1 | 31 | 2 | 9 | 1 | 0 | 0 | 0 |
| Mitchell Turner | 0 | 2 | 3 | 4 | 0 | 2 | 0 | 0 | 0 | 0 |
| Alex Banfield | 7 | 0 | 0 | 22 | 3 | 2 | 1 | 0 | 0 | 0 |
| Selvyn Davids | 4 | 0 | 0 | 74 | 4 | 18 | 6 | 0 | 0 | 0 |
| Juandré Fourie | 8 | 0 | 0 | 22 | 4 | 1 | 0 | 0 | 0 | 0 |
| Luan Nieuwoudt | 5 | 0 | 0 | 0 | 0 | 0 | 0 | 0 | 0 | 0 |
| Sherwin Slater | 7 | 2 | 1 | 10 | 2 | 0 | 0 | 0 | 0 | 0 |
| Siviwe Bisset | 0 | 3 | 1 | 0 | 0 | 0 | 0 | 0 | 0 | 0 |
| Luca Dalla-Vecchia | 1 | 0 | 1 | 0 | 0 | 0 | 0 | 0 | 0 | 0 |
| Wayburn Howley | 0 | 3 | 0 | 5 | 1 | 0 | 0 | 0 | 0 | 0 |
| Kuhle Mbiko | 1 | 0 | 0 | 5 | 1 | 0 | 0 | 0 | 0 | 0 |
| Phelo Mfini | 3 | 0 | 1 | 0 | 0 | 0 | 0 | 0 | 0 | 0 |
| Khanya Mzilikazi | 5 | 0 | 0 | 10 | 2 | 0 | 0 | 0 | 0 | 0 |
| Sergeal Petersen | 3 | 0 | 0 | 20 | 4 | 0 | 0 | 0 | 0 | 0 |
| Ethan Fortuin | 0 | 1 | 2 | 0 | 0 | 0 | 0 | 0 | 0 | 0 |
| Khaya Molotana | 10 | 0 | 0 | 35 | 7 | 0 | 0 | 0 | 1 | 0 |

- Darrel Curtis Coetzee, Justin Ferrant, Darren Ketzner, Wynand van der Merwe, Estiaan van der Westhuizen, Devon Chistopher van Eyck, Sean van Zyl, CJ Velleman and Hendrik Stephanus Venter were named in the 2013 Under-19 Provincial Championship squad, but never included in a matchday 22.

=== Player Appearances ===
Player Appearances – 2013 Under-19 Provincial Championship
| Player | PMA | GRF | GRQ | SWD | BOL | FNH | LIM | BOL | FNH | BDR |
|---|---|---|---|---|---|---|---|---|---|---|
| Lyle Lombaard | 1 | 1 | 1 | 1 | 1 | | | | | |
| JP Jamieson | 2 | 2 | | 16 | | 2 | 2 | 2 | 2 | 2 |
| Matthew Moore | 3 | 3 | 3 | 3 | 3 | 3 | 3 | 3 | 3 | 3 |
| Stephan Ebersohn | 4 | 4 | | 19 (substituted in) | 4 | 4 | 4 | 4 | 4 | 4 |
| Gerrit Huisamen | 5 | 5 | | | | 5 | 5 | 5 | 5 | 5 |
| John-Henry Schmitt | 6 | 6 | 2 | 2 | 2 | 16 | 16 (substituted in) | 6 | 6 | 6 |
| Sabelo Sam | 7 | 7 | | 6 | 6 | | | | | |
| Erwin Slabbert | 8 | 8 | 5 | 4 | 8 | 8 | 8 | 8 | 8 | 8 |
| Matthew Alborough | 9 | 9 | | | | | | | | |
| Warren Swarts | 10 | 10 | 10 | 10 | 10 | 21 (substituted in) | | | 22 | |
| Khanya Mzilikazi | 11 | 11 | 14 | 14 | | 14 | | | | |
| Juandré Fourie | 12 | 12 | 11 | 13 | 11 | 11 | 11 | 11 | | |
| Sherwin Slater | 13 | 13 | 13 | 21 (substituted in) | 13 | 22 | 13 | 21 (substituted in) | 11 | 11 |
| Phelo Mfini | 14 | 14 | 23 | 11 | | | | | | |
| Khaya Molotana | 15 | 15 | 15 | 15 | 15 | 15 | 15 | 15 | 15 | 15 |
| Divan Nell | 16 | 17 (substituted in) | | | | 23 | 23 | | | |
| Ruan de Jager | 17 | | 17 (substituted in) | | 23 | | | | | |
| Pelser Hanekom | 18 (substituted in) | 18 (substituted in) | 6 | | | | | | | |
| Dewald Meyer | 19 (substituted in) | 19 (substituted in) | 7 | | 19 (substituted in) | 19 | 18 (substituted in) | 19 (substituted in) | 19 | 19 |
| Roger Louis | 20 | | 9 | | 20 | | 21 | | | |
| Mitchell Turner | 21 (substituted in) | 21 | 21 | | 21 (substituted in) | | | | | 22 |
| Siviwe Bisset | 22 (substituted in) | 22 (substituted in) | 22 | 22 (substituted in) | | | | | | |
| Wayburn Howley | 23 (substituted in) | | | | 22 (substituted in) | | 22 (substituted in) | | | |
| Similile Qinela | | 16 (substituted in) | 16 (substituted in) | 17 (substituted in) | 17 | 17 | 17 (substituted in) | 17 (substituted in) | 17 | 17 |
| Francois Nel | | 20 (substituted in) | | 9 | 9 | 20 | 9 | 20 (substituted in) | 20 (substituted in) | 20 (substituted in) |
| Luca Dalla-Vecchia | | 23 | | | | | 14 | | | |
| Tyler Paul | | | 4 | 5 | 5 | 7 | 7 | 7 | 7 | 7 |
| Kevin Kaba | | | 8 | 8 | | 6 | | | | |
| Alex Banfield | | | 12 | 12 | 12 | 10 | | 10 | 10 | 10 |
| Francois van der Walt | | | 18 (substituted in) | 18 (substituted in) | 7 | | 20 | | | |
| Sokhana Mpemba | | | 19 | | 18 | | 19 | | | |
| Mario Mowers | | | 20 (substituted in) | | | | | | | |
| Bathandwa Cafu | | | | 7 | | 18 (substituted in) | 6 | 18 | 18 | 18 |
| Jason Baggott | | | | 20 (substituted in) | | 9 | 10 | 9 | 9 | 9 |
| David Murray | | | | 23 | | 1 | 1 | 1 | 1 | 1 |
| Kuhle Mbiko | | | | | 14 | | | | | |
| Jonathan Ford | | | | | 16 | | | 16 (substituted in) | 16 (substituted in) | 16 (substituted in) |
| Luan Nieuwoudt | | | | | | 12 | 12 | 12 | 12 | 12 |
| Selvyn Davids | | | | | | 13 | | 13 | 13 | 13 |
| Sergeal Petersen | | | | | | | | 14 | 14 | 14 |
| Ethan Fortuin | | | | | | | | 22 (substituted in) | 21 | 21 |
| Mvelo Khumalo | | | | | | | | 23 | 23 | 23 |

- Darrel Curtis Coetzee, Justin Ferrant, Darren Ketzner, Wynand van der Merwe, Estiaan van der Westhuizen, Devon Chistopher van Eyck, Sean van Zyl, CJ Velleman and Hendrik Stephanus Venter were named in the 2013 Under-19 Provincial Championship squad, but never included in a matchday 22.

== Awards ==
=== SARU Awards ===
The Kings received the following nomination for the SARU awards:

| Award | Nominee | Result |
|---|---|---|
| Currie Cup First Division Player of the Year | Tiger Mangweni | Nominated |

=== EP Kings Awards ===
The following awards were given to players for the 2013 season:

| Award | Player |
|---|---|
| Player of the Year | Ronnie Cooke |
| Most Valuable Player of the Year | Ronnie Cooke |
| Players' Player of the Year | Ronnie Cooke |
| Try of the Year | Sergeal Petersen (v Force) |
| Rookie of the Year | Tim Agaba |
| Achievement Award | Aidon Davis |
| Merit Award | Scott van Breda |
| Supporters' Player of the Year | Scott van Breda |
| Most Promising Player | Siviwe Soyizwapi |
| U21 Player of the Year | Aidon Davis |
| U19 Player of the Year | Tyler Paul |

== See also ==
- Eastern Province Elephants
- Southern Kings
- 2013 Super Rugby season
- 2013 Vodacom Cup
- 2013 Currie Cup First Division
- 2013 Under-21 Provincial Championship
- 2013 Under-19 Provincial Championship
