= Thabo Mamojele =

South African rugby union player

- Born: 29 July 1986 (age 40) Witbank, South Africa
- Height: 1.95 m (6 ft 5 in)
- Weight: 110 kg (240 lb; 17 st 5 lb)
- School: Patriot High School, Witbank
- University: Sharks Academy

Rugby union career
- Position: Flanker / Lock
Youth career
- 2004–2005: Pumas
- 2006–2007: Sharks
Amateur team(s)
Years	Team	Apps	(Points)
2010–2011	NWU Pukke	6	(0)
Senior career
Years	Team	Apps	(Points)
2007	Natal Wildebeest	2	(10)
2008	Falcons	5	(0)
2009–2011	Leopards	16	(0)
2012	Eastern Province Kings	16	(10)
2013	Southern Kings	1	(0)
2014	Golden Lions XV	5	(0)
2014–2015	Montauban	4	(0)
2016–2017	Falcons	15	(10)
- Correct as of 2 June 2018

Thabo Mamojele (born 29 July 1986) is a South African rugby union player who last played as a flanker or lock with Currie Cup side the Falcons.

== Career ==
He was born in Witbank and came through the youth ranks of his local team, the Pumas until he moved to the rugby academy of the Sharks in 2006. He played two games in 2007 for their Vodacom Cup side, the Natal Wildebeest, but failed to make the breakthrough to the first team.

He had a short spell at the Falcons for the 2008 Currie Cup Premier Division, before joining the Leopards in 2009. He played for them for three seasons and also represented the NWU Pukke in the Varsity Cup in 2009 and 2010.

In 2012, he joined the Eastern Province Kings.

=== 2013 Kings Super Rugby season ===
He was named in the Southern Kings wider training squad for the 2013 Super Rugby season, but was subsequently released to the Vodacom Cup squad. However, he did make his debut for the Southern Kings when he came on as a substitute for their final Super Rugby match of the regular 2013 Super Rugby season against the Sharks.

=== Golden Lions ===
He joined the Golden Lions for the 2014 season, but he was only in Johannesburg for a short spell before moving to French side Montauban.
