= Samora Fihlani =

South African rugby union player

- Full name: Lwazi Samora Fihlani
- Born: 14 May 1985 (age 41) East London
- Height: 1.98 m (6 ft 6 in)
- Weight: 104 kg (229 lb; 16 st 5 lb)
- School: Lumnko Secondary School

Rugby union career
- Position: Flanker
Youth career
- 2005–2006: Border Bulldogs
Senior career
Years	Team	Apps	(Points)
2008–2012	Border Bulldogs	61	(25)
2012	→ Griffons	7	(0)
2013–2015	Eastern Province Kings	17	(15)
2016–2017	Griffons	24	(0)
- Correct as of 3 June 2018
International career
Years	Team	Apps	(Points)
2012	South African Barbarians (South)	1	(0)
- Correct as of 21 February 2013

Lwazi Samora Fihlani is a South African rugby union player who last played for the Griffons. He can play as a lock or flanker.

== Career ==
Fihlani came through the Border youth system and played for their Under-21 team in 2005 and 2006.

In 2008, he graduated to the first team, making his debut in the 2010 Vodacom Cup season against the Golden Lions.

He became a regular for the Bulldogs, making 59 first team appearances over the next five seasons. In 2012, he had a short loan spell at the Griffons and signed a deal to join the Eastern Province Kings for 2013 on a two-year deal.

He was named in the Southern Kings wider training squad for the 2013 Super Rugby season, but was subsequently released to the Vodacom Cup squad. He was a regular in his first season at the Kings, making 17 appearances. However, he sustained a serious knee injury that ruled him out of the entire 2014 season. Although he was not initially named in the EP Kings' pre-season squad for 2015, he did join in with the training group at the start of 2015 following a recovery from his knee injury.
