= Virgile Lacombe =

French rugby union player

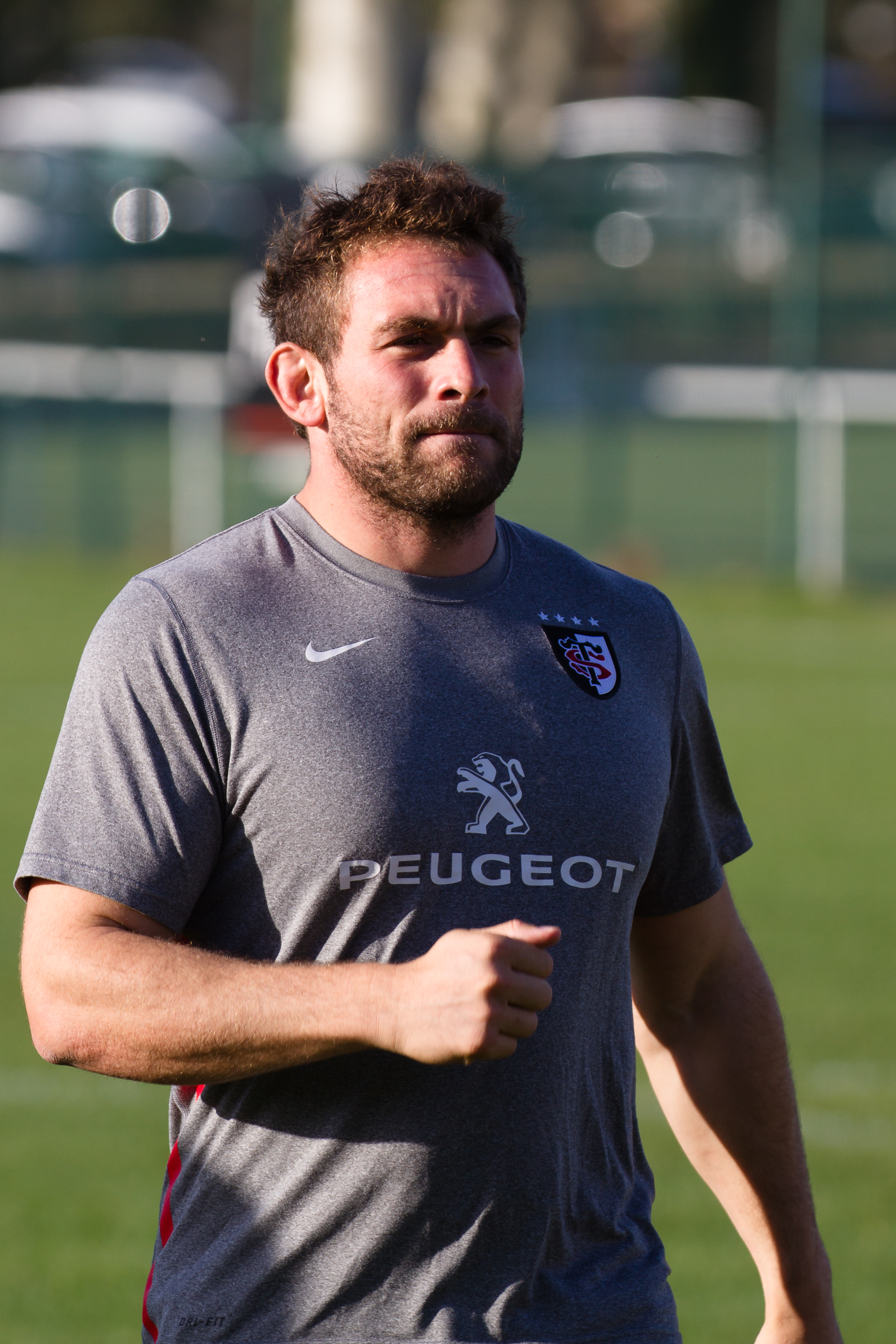
- Born: 7 July 1984 (age 42) Brou-sur-Chantereine, France
- Height: 1.81 m (5 ft 11 in)
- Weight: 103 kg (227 lb; 16 st 3 lb)

Rugby union career
- Position: Hooker
Senior career
Years	Team	Apps	(Points)
–1999	Nîmes		
2004–11	Toulouse	131	(45)
2011–12	Brive	20	(15)
2012	→ Toulouse	7	(5)
2013	Eastern Province Kings	3	(5)
2013	Southern Kings	4	(0)
2013–2017	Racing Métro	92	(35)
2017–2019	Lyon OU	53	(20)
2019–	Stade Toulousain	N/A	(N/A)
- Correct as of 15 May 2021

Virgile Lacombe (born 7 July 1984 in Brou-sur-Chantereine, France) was a French rugby union footballer who usually played in the hooker position. He became a coach with Stade Toulousain after retiring.

== Career ==
He started his career at Nîmes, but moved to Toulouse for the 1999–2000 French Rugby Union Championship. During seven seasons at Toulouse, he made 131 appearances and won the Top 14 championship in 2007–08 and 2010–11, as well as the Heineken Cup in 2004–05 and the 2009–10.

He then joined CA Brive for the 2011–12 Top 14 season, but returned to Toulouse the following season as a medical joker.

=== 2013 Southern Kings Super Rugby season ===
He joined the Southern Kings for the 2013 Super Rugby season.

He didn't feature in their first three games, but was then named in their touring squad to Australasia for games against Crusaders, Hurricanes, Brumbies and Rebels,. However, he was then recalled after the Kings fielded more than the allowed two foreigner players in their match against the Chiefs. Instead, he make three appearances for the Eastern Province Kings in the domestic 2013 Vodacom Cup tournament, scoring a try in the match against the Border Bulldogs.

Following an injury to New Zealander Hadleigh Parkes, he was eligible for selection again and made his debut for the Southern Kings in their match against the Cheetahs in Bloemfontein. He also made substitute appearances in the next three matches against the Waratahs, Highlanders and the return match against the Cheetahs.

=== Return to France ===
He signed a deal to return to France to play for Racing Métro for 2013–14 and left the Kings in July 2013. His last club as a player will be Lyon OU which he joined in 2017, before retiring in 2019 to accept a role as scrum coach for his beloved club, Stade Toulousain.

== Honours ==
- Top 14 – 2007–08 and 2010–11 with Toulouse
- Heineken Cup – 2004–05 and 2009–10 with Toulouse
