= Boela Abrahams =

South African rugby union player

- Full name: Yuseph Williams Abrahams
- Born: 23 July 1988 (age 38) Port Elizabeth
- Height: 1.63 m (5 ft 4 in)
- Weight: 65 kg (143 lb; 10 st 3 lb)
- School: Hentie Cilliers, Virginia

Rugby union career
- Position: Scrum-half
- Current team: Leopards
Youth career
- 2005–2007: Griffons
- 2009: Eastern Province Kings
Amateur team(s)
Years	Team	Apps	(Points)
2012	Maties	8	(0)
Senior career
Years	Team	Apps	(Points)
2007–2008	Griffons	4	(0)
2009–2013	Eastern Province Kings	20	(0)
2014	Griquas	0	(0)
2014–2016	Griffons	47	(46)
2017	SWD Eagles	3	(0)
2018	Griffons	6	(0)
2019–present	Leopards	5	(3)
- Correct as of 25 August 2019
International career
Years	Team	Apps	(Points)
2011	South African Kings	2	(0)
2012	South African Barbarians (South)	1	(0)
- Correct as of 17 October 2014

Yuseph Williams 'Boela' Abrahams (born 23 July 1988) is a South African rugby union player for the Leopards in the Currie Cup and Rugby Challenge.

He started his career playing for the Griffons at youth level, before making the squad in 2007. In 2009, he joined the Eastern Province Kings and was named in their squad for the 2011 Vodacom Cup season.

He was released at the end of 2011 and joined Maties for the 2012 Varsity Cup, but rejoined the Kings a few months later on a two-year deal.

He joined Welkom-based side Griffons in 2014. He was a key member of their 2014 Currie Cup First Division-winning side. He played in the final, scoring a try and kicking a decisive drop goal in the last ten minutes of the match to help the Griffons win the match 23–21 to win their first trophy for six years.

A few days later, Abrahams was invited to join a Springbok training camp prior to their end-of-year tour to Europe.
