= Kuselo Moyake =

Romania international rugby union player

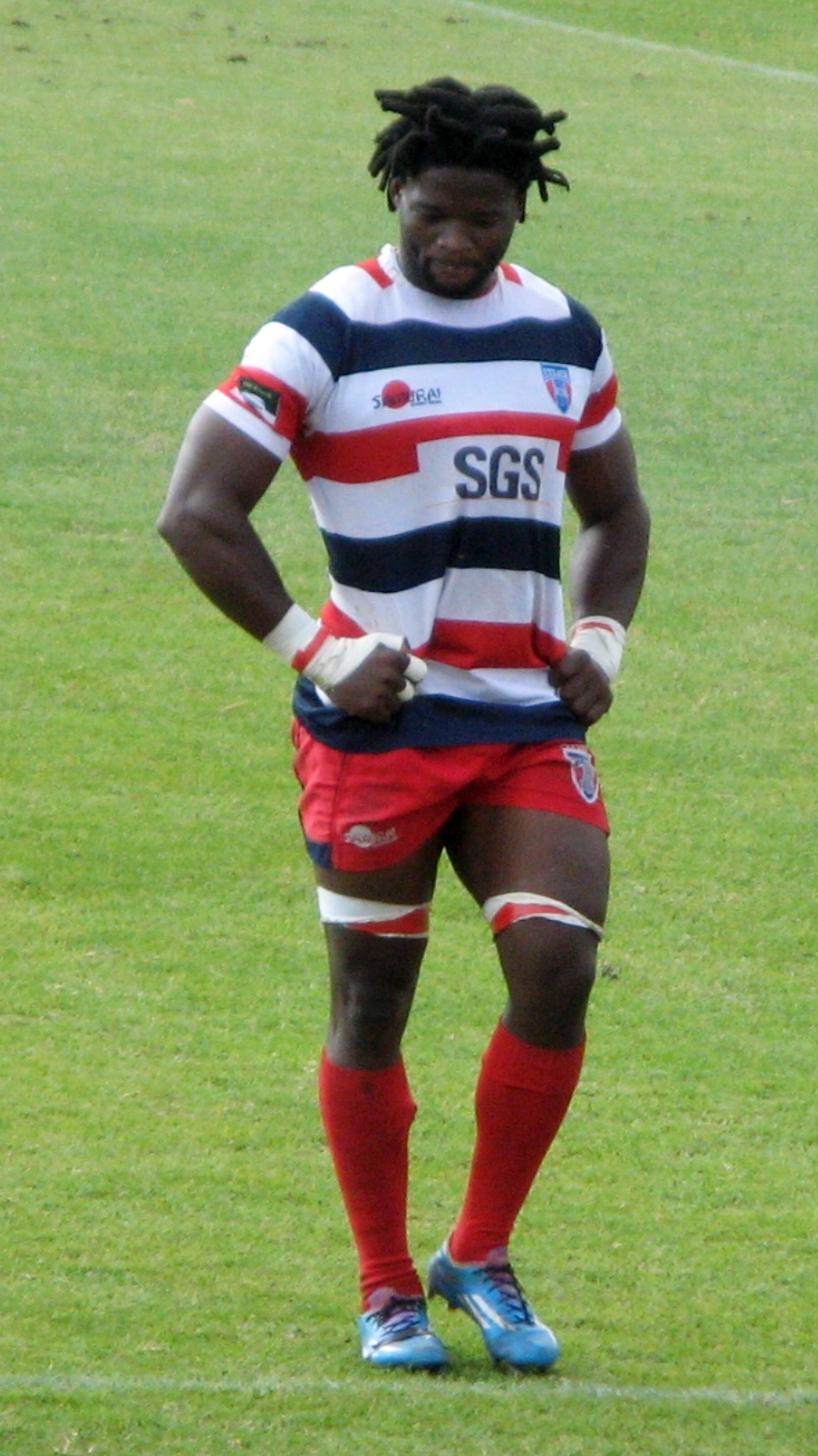
- Kuselo Moyake playing for CSA Steaua București in 2017-18 Romanian SuperLiga
- Full name: Kuselo Moyake
- Born: 7 August 1986 (age 40) Ntlaza
- Height: 1.84 m (6 ft 1/2 in)
- Weight: 100 kg (220 lb; 15 st 10 lb)
- School: Simon's Town High School
- University: Cape Peninsula University of Technology

Rugby union career
- Position: Flanker
Youth career
- 2004: Border Country Districts
Amateur team(s)
Years	Team	Apps	(Points)
2008–2009	UCT Ikey Tigers	7	(0)
2011–2012	SK Walmers		
Senior career
Years	Team	Apps	(Points)
2013	Eastern Province Kings	7	(0)
2014–2016	Baie Mare	12	(5)
2016–2021	Steaua București		
2022–	Universitatea Cluj-Napoca	4	(5)
- Correct as of 25 November 2017
International career
Years	Team	Apps	(Points)
2017–	Romania	4	(10)
- Correct as of 25 August 2018

Kuselo Moyake (born 7 August 1986) is a South African-born Romanian rugby union player, currently playing with Romanian side Universitatea Cluj. His regular position is flanker. He also plays for Romania's national team, the Oaks, making his international debut during Week 6 of the 2017 end-of-year rugby union internationals in a match against ʻIkale Tahi.

== Career ==
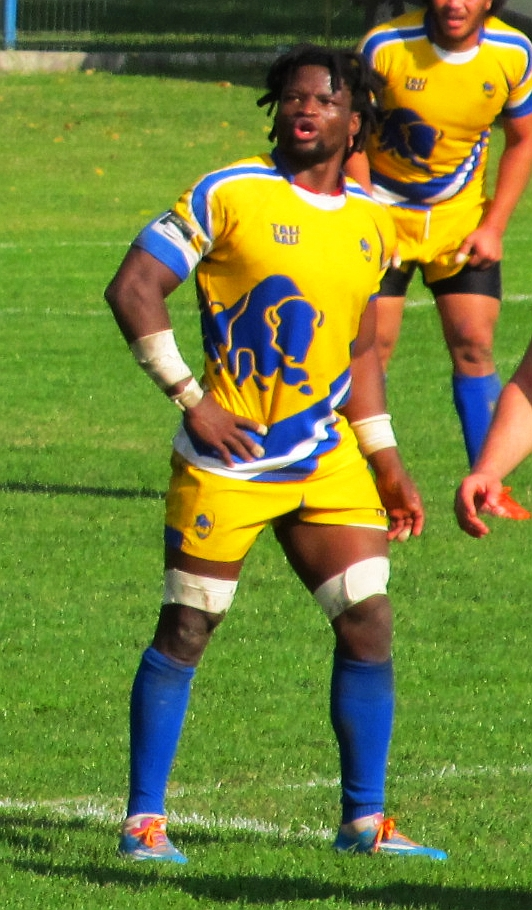
Kuselo Moyake playing for Baie Mare during a SuperLiga match in 2015

He played for Border Country Districts at the 2004 Craven Week. He then represented UCT Ikey Tigers in the Varsity Cup between 2008 and 2010 and also played for a SK Walmers club side that qualified for the 2013 SARU Community Cup.

He was then signed by the Eastern Province Kings and included in their senior squad for the 2013 Vodacom Cup. He made his debut in the 20-all draw against the Pampas XV.

He made his first appearance in the Currie Cup competition in the opening fixture of the 2013 Currie Cup First Division season, when he started the match against the Pumas.

He was released by the EP Kings at the end of 2013 and joined Romanian SuperLiga side Baie Mare. He scored one try for them during the 2014 Superliga season to help them win the title. From February 2016 until 2021 Kuselo was part of Steaua București rugby club. He then transferred to Universitatea Cluj-Napoca.
