= Dalton Davis =

South African rugby union player

- Born: 19 November 1990 (age 35) Uitenhage
- Height: 1.90 m (6 ft 3 in)
- Weight: 110 kg (240 lb; 17 st 5 lb)
- School: HTS Daniel Pienaar
- Notable relative: Aidon Davis

Rugby union career
- Position: No 8
- Current team: Graulhet
Youth career
- 2006: Eastern Province Kings
- 2009–2011: Blue Bulls
Amateur team(s)
Years	Team	Apps	(Points)
2015–2017	Despatch	34	(40)
2017–2018	Decazeville	12	(10)
Senior career
Years	Team	Apps	(Points)
2013	Eastern Province Kings	10	(10)
2013	→ Griquas	3	(5)
2013–2014	L'Aquila	15	(25)
2018–present	Graulhet	5	(5)
- Correct as of 7 April 2015

Dalton Davis is a South African rugby union player, currently playing with French Fédérale 1 club Graulhet. His regular position is eighth man or flanker.

== Career ==
=== Youth and Varsity Rugby ===
He played for the Eastern Province Kings at the Under-16 Grant Khomo week in 2006, before moving to the Blue Bulls, where he played in the Under-19 Provincial Championship in 2009 and the Under-21 Provincial Championship in 2010 and 2011.

He also played for UP Tuks in the 2011 Varsity Cup.

=== Eastern Province Kings ===
He returned to the Eastern Province Kings in 2013 and was included in the senior squad for the 2013 Vodacom Cup and made his debut against Western Province.

He made his first appearance in the Currie Cup competition in the opening fixture of the 2013 Currie Cup First Division season, when he started the match against the Pumas.

=== Griquas ===
He joined Griquas during the 2013 Currie Cup Premier Division season.

=== L'Aquila ===
In October 2013, he joined Italian National Championship of Excellence side L'Aquila.

=== Decazeville ===
He joined French Fédérale 2 club Decazeville in August 2017.
