= Marzuq Maarman =

South African rugby union player

- Full name: Marzuq Maarman
- Born: 23 September 1992 (age 34) Port Elizabeth, South Africa
- Height: 1.81 m (5 ft 11 1/2 in)
- Weight: 131 kg (289 lb; 20 st 9 lb)
- School: Muir College

Rugby union career
- Position: Prop
- Current team: Ogniwo Sopot
Youth career
- 2010: Eastern Province Kings
- 2010–2012: Blue Bulls
- 2012–present: Eastern Province Kings
Amateur team(s)
Years	Team	Apps	(Points)
2015–present	NMMU Madibaz	12	(5)
Senior career
Years	Team	Apps	(Points)
2013	Eastern Province Kings	1	(0)
2017–2018	Timișoara Saracens	?	(?)
2018–2020	Valence D'Agen	14	(5)
2021	Eastern Province Elephants	0	(0)
2021–	Krasny Yar Krasnoyarsk	1	(0)
- Correct as of 27 March 2022

Marzuq Maarman is a South African rugby union player, currently playing with Polish Ekstraliga side Ogniwo Sopot. His regular position is prop.

== Career ==
=== Youth ===
He played for the Eastern Province Kings at the Under-18 Craven Week in 2010, as well as the Under-19 Provincial Championship competition later in the same year. He then moved to Pretoria, where he played for the Blue Bulls U19 team in the 2011 Under-19 Provincial Championship competition and was in the Blue Bulls U21 squad for the 2012 Under-21 Provincial Championship competition. He returned to Port Elizabeth later that year.

=== Senior career ===
He was included in the Eastern Province Kings squad for the 2013 Currie Cup First Division season and he made his first class debut in their match against the Border Bulldogs.
