= Brian Skosana =

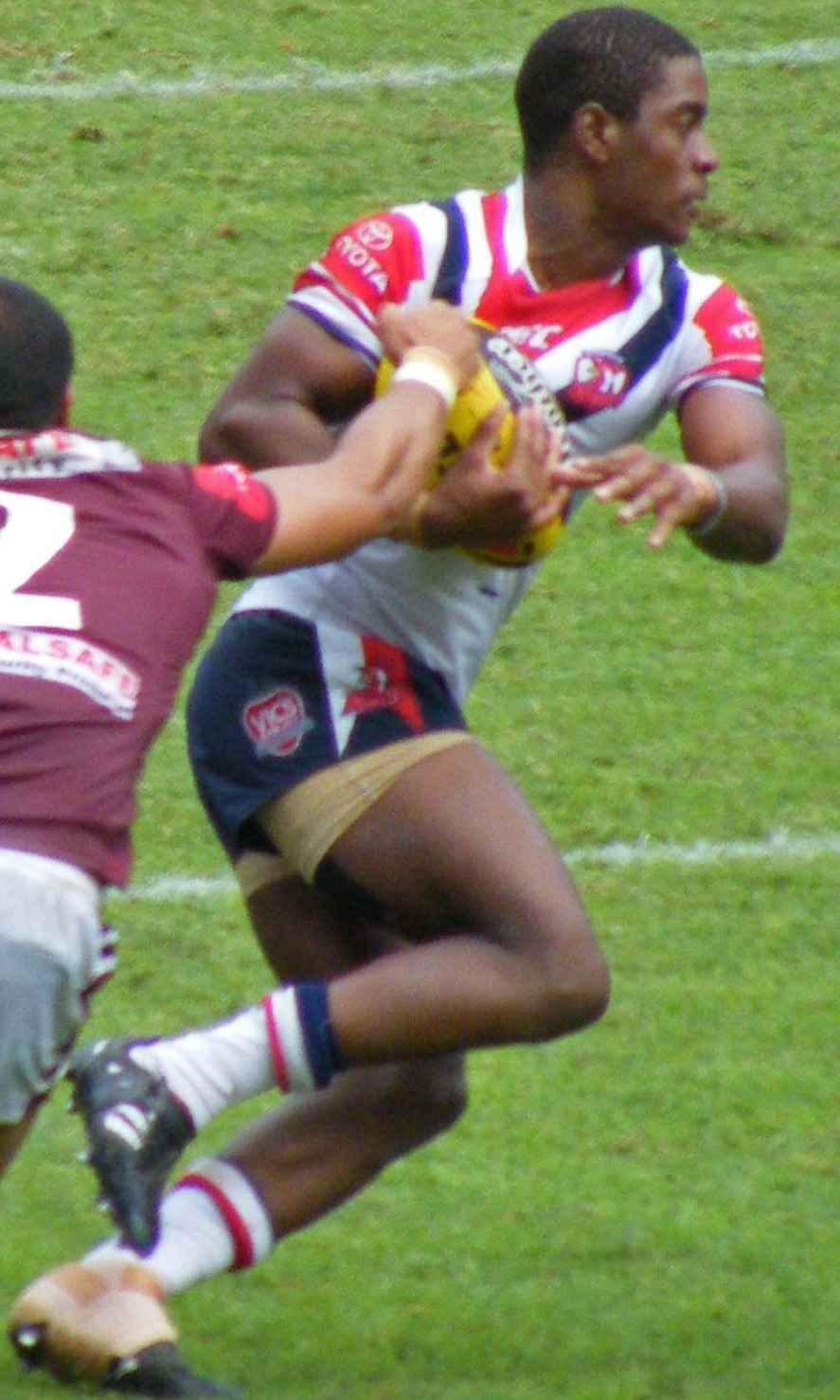
- Full name: Mthangala Brian Skosana
- Born: 5 December 1991 (age 34) Johannesburg
- Height: 1.80 m (5 ft 11 in)
- Weight: 89 kg (196 lb; 14 st 0 lb)
- School: St Andrew's College
- University: Nelson Mandela Metropolitan University

Rugby union career
- Position: Centre / Winger
- Current team: SWD Eagles
Youth career
- 2009: Eastern Province Country Districts
- 2010: Golden Lions
- 2010–2011: Sydney Roosters (rugby league)
- 2012: Eastern Province Kings
Amateur team(s)
Years	Team	Apps	(Points)
2013–present	NMMU Madibaz	8	(10)
Senior career
Years	Team	Apps	(Points)
2013–2014	Eastern Province Kings	19	(15)
2014–present	SWD Eagles	19	(50)
- Correct as of 8 October 2015
International career
Years	Team	Apps	(Points)
2009	South Africa Schools		
- Correct as of 5 April 2013

Mthangala Brian Skosana (born 5 December 1991) is a former South African professional rugby union player, who last played with the SWD Eagles. His regular position is centre or wing.

== Career ==
=== Early career ===
While attending St. Andrew's College in Grahamstown, he played for Eastern Province Country Districts at the 2009 Craven Week which earned him a call-up to the South African Schools team that season. His performances there lead to a move to the Golden Lions academy, but he was also noticed by Australian rugby league team Sydney Roosters and he joined their academy in August 2010, alongside fellow South African JP du Plessis.

=== Eastern Province Kings ===
He returned to South Africa at the start of 2012, joining Eastern Province Kings and playing for their Under–21 team that year in the 2012 Under-21 Provincial Championship. He made eight appearances in the competition and scored a hat-trick of tries in his fifth match, a 41–3 victory over the Pumas U21 side.

The following season, he was included in the senior squad for the 2013 Vodacom Cup. After being an unused substitute in their match against the Sharks XV, Skosana made his first class debut the following week when he started their match against the Boland Cavaliers in Malmesbury, the first of two starts during the season.

Later in the same season, Skosana also made his Currie Cup debut. He came on as a substitute in the Kings' 44–18 victory over the Falcons in Brakpan. After four more substitute appearances, Skosana made his first Currie Cup start on 13 September 2013 against Western Cape side the Boland Cavaliers, which also saw Skosana score his first senior try in the 18th minute of the match.

He made a total of ten appearances in the 2013 Currie Cup and returned to Vodacom Cup action in 2014, scoring two tries in seven appearances.

=== SWD Eagles ===
Prior to the 2014 Currie Cup Premier Division, Skosana was not one of the players in coach Carlos Spencer's plans for the competition and he joined George-based side SWD Eagles on a deal until the end of 2015.
