= Sphephelo Mayaba =

South African rugby union player

- Born: 31 May 1987 (age 39) Pietermaritzburg, South Africa
- Height: 1.81 m (5 ft 11 1/2 in)
- Weight: 120 kg (260 lb; 18 st 13 lb)
- School: Pinetown Boys' High School
- University: UNISA

Rugby union career
- Position: Prop
- Current team: College Rovers
Youth career
- 2007: Sharks
Amateur team(s)
Years	Team	Apps	(Points)
2015–present	College Rovers		
Senior career
Years	Team	Apps	(Points)
2009	Sharks (Currie Cup)	2	(0)
2010	Eastern Province Kings	2	(0)
- Correct as of 4 February 2014

Sphephelo Mayaba (born 31 May 1987) is a South African rugby union player, currently playing for KwaZulu-Natal club side College Rovers.

He was born in Pietermaritzburg and was included in the Sharks squad for the 2009 Vodacom Cup competition, before moving on to the Eastern Province Kings in 2010.
