= Daniel Adongo =

Kenyan sportsman (born 1989)

No. 56
- Position: Linebacker

Personal information
- Born: 12 October 1989 (age 37); Nairobi, Kenya
- Listed height: 6 ft 5 in (1.96 m)
- Listed weight: 270 lb (122 kg)

Career information
- College: University of Pretoria
- NFL draft: 2013: undrafted

Career history
- Indianapolis Colts (2013−2015)

Career NFL statistics
- Games played: 5
- Stats at Pro Football Reference

Other information
- Full name: Daniel Ojambo Adongo
- Height: 1.96 m (6 ft 5 in)
- Weight: 112 kg (247 lb)
- University: University of Pretoria

Rugby union career
- Position: Lock / Flanker
Youth career
- –2006: Kenya Harlequins
- 2007–2010: Sharks
Amateur team(s)
Years	Team	Apps	(Points)
2012	UP Tuks	3	(0)
Senior career
Years	Team	Apps	(Points)
2011	Sharks (Currie Cup)	10	(15)
2012	Blue Bulls	8	(5)
2012	Counties Manukau	9	(0)
2013	Southern Kings	5	(0)
2013	Eastern Province Kings	4	(0)
- Correct as of 28 June 2013
International career
Years	Team	Apps	(Points)
- Kenya Under-18
- Kenya Under-21

Daniel Ojambo Adongo (born 12 October 1989) is a Kenyan former sportsman. He moved to South Africa in 2007 to join the Sharks' rugby academy and played professional rugby union in South Africa and New Zealand between 2011 and 2013. He then converted to American football, joining the Indianapolis Colts as a linebacker until 2015.

== Rugby union ==
As a rugby player, he plays either as a lock or a flanker, and last played Super Rugby for the Southern Kings in the 2013 Super Rugby season.

=== Youth ===
In Kenya, he joined the Kenya Harlequins junior team. He was spotted by South African scouts at the 2006 Safari Sevens tournament, playing in the schools category for School. In 2007, he joined to the Sharks academy. He progressed from Under–19 level in 2008 to Under–21 level in 2010.

=== Sharks ===
He was included in the Sharks XV squad for the 2010 Vodacom Cup, but failed to play in any matches. He did play in twelve Under–21 matches later in the year and was once again included in the squad for the 2011 Vodacom Cup competition, where he made his debut in the opening match of the season, a 30–19 victory over the Blue Bulls. He made a total of ten appearances in that competition, scoring three tries. He was also included in the Sharks squad for the 2011 Currie Cup Premier Division, but failed to feature in that competition.

=== Blue Bulls ===
At the end of 2011, he was signed by the Blue Bulls. He made eight appearances for them in the 2012 Vodacom Cup, but he was then released from his contract after just six months to join New Zealand ITM Cup team Counties Manukau.

=== Counties Manukau ===
He joined Counties Manukau prior to the 2012 ITM Cup. He made his debut against Southland and played in eight matches for them on their way to winning the Championship and subsequent promotion to the Premiership. However, he wasn't named in their 2013 squad.

=== Kings ===
He joined the Southern Kings from Counties Manukau for the 2013 Super Rugby season. He was an unused substitute in the Kings' historic first ever match against the Force, but he did make his Super Rugby debut the following week, coming on as a late substitute against his former team the Sharks. He also appeared against the Chiefs and then made his first Super Rugby start against the Crusaders in Christchurch. However, after another substitute appearance against the Brumbies, he fell below Rynier Bernardo in the pecking order and reverted to playing domestic rugby, playing three matches for the Eastern Province Kings in the 2013 Vodacom Cup competition. One more substitute appearance in the home victory over the Highlanders followed, as well as playing the opening match of the 2013 Currie Cup First Division season, but his season then came to a premature end following a torn biceps injury.

=== Varsity Cup ===
He also played for UP Tuks in the 2012 Varsity Cup, playing in three matches.

=== International ===
Internationally, he played for the Kenyan Under–18 and Under–21 national teams, and, although he initially expressed a desire to play for South Africa internationally, he declared himself available for Kenya for the 2015 Rugby World Cup qualifying series.

== American football ==
On 25 July 2013, the Indianapolis Colts of the National Football League (NFL) announced that they signed Adongo as an outside linebacker despite the fact that he had no prior American football experience. After spending time as a member of the Colts' practice squad, Adongo was added to the Colts' active roster on 3 December. Adongo appeared in two games for the Colts in 2013, but did not record a tackle.

On 7 August 2014, Adongo received a bicep injury during a pre-season game, and was waived with the injury designation by the Colts the following day. When he cleared waivers, he reverted to the Indianapolis Colts' injured reserve.

On 5 September 2015, Adongo was waived by the Colts. He was signed to the practice squad the following day. Adongo was elevated to the active roster on 12 November. He was waived again on 17 December after law enforcement personnel received at least two reports of possible domestic violence between Adongo and an unidentified female.

== Life after sport ==
Adongo's father has expressed concern about difficulties his son was experiencing after his sports career ended. On June 20, 2026 United States Immigration and Customs Enforcement deported Adongo for overstaying his visa after his NFL career ended in 2015 and being ordered to leave the United States. Between leaving the NFL and his deportation, Adongo had been arrested several times in Indiana for crimes such as felony intimidation, battery, and disorderly conduct. In 2020, he was sentenced to 364 days in jail for criminal mischief. On July 28, 2026, the Instagram account for ICE posted about this incident.
