= Kuhle Sonkosi =

South African rugby union player

- Full name: Kuhle Sonkosi
- Born: 23 August 1992 (age 34) East London, South Africa
- Height: 1.85 m (6 ft 1 in)
- Weight: 96 kg (212 lb; 15 st 2 lb)
- School: Westering High School, Port Elizabeth

Rugby union career
- Position: Lock
- Current team: Eastern Province Kings
Youth career
- 2010–2013: Eastern Province Kings
Senior career
Years	Team	Apps	(Points)
2013–2015	Eastern Province Kings	2	(5)
- Correct as of 1 April 2014

Kuhle Sonkosi (born 23 August 1992) is a South African social media personality and former rugby union player who last played with the Eastern Province Kings. His regular position was lock.

== Career ==
=== Youth ===
Sonkosi first represented Eastern Province at the 2010 Under-18 Academy Week tournament. He played for the Eastern Province U19 side in the 2011 Under-19 Provincial Championship competition and for the Eastern Province U21 side in the 2012 and 2013 competitions, winning the Under-21 Division B title on both occasions.

=== Eastern Province Kings ===
He made his senior debut for the Eastern Province Kings in the 2014 Vodacom Cup by starting in their 17–10 opening day defeat to Kenyan side Simba XV. He scored his first try in senior rugby in his second match two weeks later, against Western Province in Cape Town.

He did not feature in the Eastern Province Kings' return to the Premier Division of the Currie Cup in 2014, but was named in a Kings training squad for the 2015 season.

== Personal life ==
Sonkosi was born in East London, but "moved quite a lot" until his family settled in Port Elizabeth when he was eight years old. After his playing career, he worked as a teacher and rugby coach at Woodridge College. Sonkosi later went viral on social media for acting and producing in "comedic post-match modelled interviews for everyday chores and activities."
