= Kevin Kaba =

South African rugby union player

- Full name: Kevin Aneh Kaba
- Born: 29 July 1994 (age 32) Kumasi, Ghana
- Height: 1.84 m (6 ft 1/2 in)
- Weight: 102 kg (225 lb; 16 st 1 lb)
- School: Queen's College
- University: Nelson Mandela University

Rugby union career
- Position: Flank
- Current team: Griquas
Youth career
- 2007–2010: Border Bulldogs
- 2013–2015: Eastern Province Kings
Senior career
Years	Team	Apps	(Points)
2017	Eastern Province Kings	5	(0)
2017–2018	Griquas	7	(0)
- Correct as of 25 August 2018

Kevin Aneh Kaba (born 29 July 1994) is a Ghana-born South African rugby union player for Griquas in the Currie Cup and the Rugby Challenge. His regular position is flank or eighth man.

He started his career at the Eastern Province Kings academy in Port Elizabeth. He was included in the South Africa Under-20 training squad in 2014, but missed out due to injury. He represented the Eastern Province Kings in the 2017 Rugby Challenge before joining Griquas.
