= Eben Barnard =

South African rugby union player

- Full name: Eben Philip Barnard
- Born: 29 January 1992 (age 34) Paarl, South Africa
- School: Hoërskool Brandwag, Uitenhage

Rugby union career
- Position: Winger
Youth career
- 2010–2012: Eastern Province Kings
Amateur team(s)
Years	Team	Apps	(Points)
2015	NMMU Madibaz	1	(0)
Senior career
Years	Team	Apps	(Points)
2013–2015	Eastern Province Kings	9	(10)
- Correct as of 24 March 2015

Eben Philip Barnard (born 29 January 1992) is a South African rugby union player who most recently played with the Eastern Province Kings. His regular position is winger.

== Career ==
He played for the Eastern Province Kings at the 2010 Under-18 Academy Week, advancing to Under-21 level in 2012.

He was included in the senior squad for the 2013 Vodacom Cup and made his first class debut against Boland Cavaliers.
