= Albé de Swardt =

South African rugby union player

- Full name: Albertus Jacobus de Swardt
- Born: 10 August 1990 (age 36) George, South Africa
- Height: 1.87 m (6 ft 1 1/2 in)
- Weight: 100 kg (15 st 10 lb; 220 lb)
- School: Outeniqua High, George
- University: Maties

Rugby union career
- Position: Hooker
Youth career
- 2006–2008: SWD Eagles
- 2009–2011: Western Province
Amateur team(s)
Years	Team	Apps	(Points)
2013	NMMU Madibaz	7	(0)
Senior career
Years	Team	Apps	(Points)
2011	Western Province	1	(0)
2012	L'Aquila Rugby	8	(0)
2013–2015	Eastern Province Kings	24	(0)
2011–2015	Total	33	(0)
- Correct as of 10 October 2014
International career
Years	Team	Apps	(Points)
2008	Under-18 Elite squad		
- Correct as of 2 April 2013

Albertus Jacobus de Swardt (born 10 August 1990 in George, South Africa) is a former South African rugby union player, whose regular playing position was hooker. He started his career with Western Province in 2011 and, after a short spell in Italy with L'Aquila in 2012, returned to South Africa to play for the Eastern Province Kings between 2013 and 2015.

He retired at the start of 2016, aged 25.

== Rugby career ==
He played for the SWD Eagles at the Under-16 Grant Khomo Week in 2006 and the Under-18 Craven Week in 2008 before joining Western Province. He played for them in the Under-19 and Under-21 Provincial Championship between 2009 and 2011 and made his first class debut in the 2011 Vodacom Cup game against the Falcons. During this time, he also played for Maties in the 2011 and 2012 Varsity Cup competitions.

He then moved to Italian National Championship of Excellence team L'Aquila for a short spell in 2012.

He returned to South Africa in 2013 to join Eastern Province Kings on a two-year deal. He made his debut for the Eastern Province Kings – as well as his Currie Cup debut – in the 37–21 victory over the Griffons on 6 July 2013 in Welkom.

He also played for the NMMU Madibaz team that reached the semi-finals of the Varsity Cup.

In 2014, he was selected on the bench for the Eastern Province Kings side to face Wales during a tour match during a 2014 incoming tour. He came on as a late substitute, played the last eight minutes as the Kings suffered a 12–34 defeat.

A hamstring injury sustained in 2011 caused De Swart several hip and groin issues in later years and he retired at the start of 2016 on medical advice.

=== Statistics ===
As of 13 January 2016.

First class career
Season	Teams	Currie Cup Premier		Currie Cup First		Vodacom Cup		Championship of Excellence		Other		Total	
Season	Teams	Apps	Pts	Apps	Pts	Apps	Pts	Apps	Pts	Apps	Pts	Apps	Pts
2011	Western Province	—	—	—	—	1	0	—	—	—	—	1	0
2012	L'Aquila Rugby	—	—	—	—	—	—	8	0	—	—	8	0
2013	Eastern Province Kings	—	—	11	0	—	—	—	—	—	—	11	0
2014	Eastern Province Kings	5	0	—	—	7	0	—	—	1	0	13	0
2015	Eastern Province Kings	—	—	—	—	—	—	—	—	—	—	0	0
2011	Western Province Total	—	—	—	—	1	0	—	—	—	—	1	0
2012	L'Aquila Total	—	—	—	—	—	—	8	0	—	—	8	0
2013–2015	Eastern Province Kings Total	5	0	11	0	7	0	—	—	1	0	24	0
2011–2015	Career Total	5	0	11	0	8	0	8	0	1	0	33	0
