= Michael Killian =

South African rugby union player

- Full name: Michael Killian
- Born: 22 November 1983 (age 42) Uitenhage, South Africa
- Height: 1.82 m (5 ft 11 1/2 in)
- Weight: 84 kg (185 lb; 13 st 3 lb)
- University: Nelson Mandela Metropolitan University

Rugby union career
- Position: Winger
Youth career
- 2002–2003: Mighty Elephants
Senior career
Years	Team	Apps	(Points)
2004–2007, 2012–2014	Eastern Province Kings	84	(140)
2008–2011	Golden Lions	58	(128)
2009–2012	Lions	37	(50)
2013–2014	Southern Kings	4	(0)
2004–2014	Total	183	(318)
- Correct as of 26 March 2014
International career
Years	Team	Apps	(Points)
2005, 2007	South Africa Students	2	(0)
- Correct as of 10 April 2013

Michael Killian (born 22 November 1983) is a former South African rugby union player. He played mostly as a winger and represented the Eastern Province Kings and Golden Lions in domestic South African rugby and the Southern Kings and Lions in Super Rugby.

== Career ==
He started his career at the Kings (previously known as the Mighty Elephants) and made 58 appearances for them over 7 seasons. In 2008, he moved to the Golden Lions, where he also became a regular for the Lions Super Rugby franchise.

On 5 June 2012, he announced that he would rejoin the Eastern Province Kings (formerly the Mighty Elephants) for the 2012 Currie Cup First Division. He was also named in the Southern Kings squad for the 2013 Super Rugby season.

He announced his retirement from rugby in April 2014 to pursue a career in the corporate sector.
