= 2014 Eastern Province Kings season =

Team Information
- Stadium: Nelson Mandela Bay Stadium
- President: Cheeky Watson

Currie Cup
- Coach: Carlos Spencer
- Captain: Luke Watson / Steven Sykes / Darron Nell / Ronnie Cooke
- Rank: 8th
- Record: Won 1, Lost 9
- Top points scorer: Scott van Breda (44)
- Top try scorers: Shane Gates (5)

Vodacom Cup (South)
- Coach: Mzwandile Stick
- Captain: Paul Schoeman / Stephan Zaayman / Albé de Swardt
- Rank: 5th
- Record: Won 3, Lost 4
- Top points scorer: Ntabeni Dukisa (50)
- Top try scorers: Masixole Banda / Eben Barnard / Selvyn Davids / Ntabeni Dukisa / Ivan-John du Preez / Brian Skosana (2)

Other seasons
- Previous season: ← 2013
- Next season: 2015 →

In 2014, the Eastern Province Kings will participate in the Currie Cup and the Vodacom Cup competitions. The Eastern Province U21 team will also play in the 2014 Under-21 Provincial Championship and the Eastern Province U19 team in the 2014 Under-19 Provincial Championship. As part of the Southern Kings franchise, a number of players also participated in friendlies for this franchise.

== Chronological list of events ==
- 5 November 2013: The squad for the 2014 season is revealed. New recruits include Jaco Grobler and BG Uys from the Leopards and Simon Kerrod from the Sharks.
- 11 November 2013: Rynier Bernardo and Shane Gates join the Cheetahs wider training group prior to the 2014 Super Rugby season.
- 11 November 2013: The Kings announce that eighteen players from clubs from the Eastern Province union will be included in the EP Kings wider training squad for the 2014 Vodacom Cup. The players selected are: Raymond Darries (Progress), Monray Evans (Grahamstown Brumbies), Giovano Fourie (Despatch), Tildon Goliath (Hankey Villagers), Tashriq Hearn (SAPS), Ben Jacobs (Progress), Kalvano King (Trying Stars), Ben Kleynhans (SAPS), Lance Louw (Rosebuds), Ronwich Lovemore (Gardens), Vincent Mains (Grahamstown Brumbies), Athenhosi Manentsa (African Bombers), Lumko Mbane (African Bombers), Luvuyo Mhlobiso (Spring Rose), Kevin Plaatjies (SAPS), Curtis Sias (Progress), Wade Stuurman (Kruisfontein) and Ignick Windvogel (Hankey Villagers).
- 17 November 2013: Lizo Gqoboka and George Whitehead join the Sharks wider training group prior to the 2014 Super Rugby season.
- 19 November 2013: Giovano Fourie declines an invitation to join the wider training squad for the 2014 Vodacom Cup due to work commitments in Rustenburg.
- 10 December 2013: Carlos Spencer joins the Kings as kicking and specialist skills coach on a five-year contract.
- 14 December 2013: Head coach Matt Sexton quits the Kings to return to New Zealand for personal reasons.
- 17 December 2013: Although initially signing for Toulouse as a medical joker, prop Schalk Ferreira signs a new three-year deal with the side, ruling out a return to the Kings.
- 3 January 2014: The Kings announce that UFS Shimlas head coach and Cheetahs and Free State Cheetahs defensive coach Michael Horak will join them as a defensive coach following the completion of Shimlas' 2014 Varsity Cup campaign.
- 5 January 2014: Centre and vice-captain Andries Strauss joins Scottish side Edinburgh until 2016.
- 7 January 2014: Tiger Mangweni retires as a player and is appointed as the defensive coach for the EP Kings' Vodacom Cup side.
- 18 January 2014: Rynier Bernardo and Shane Gates, who were part of the Cheetahs wider training group, are not named in their final training group.
- 20 January 2014: Centre Dwayne Jenner joins the Kings from the Border Bulldogs, lock Stephan Greeff joins on a loan deal from the Golden Lions and hookers JC Oberholzer (from the Leopards) and Tabbie du Plessis (the younger brother of Springboks Bismarck and Jannie) join the Kings on trial.
- 25 January 2014: The Southern Kings – made up entirely of Eastern Province Kings players – lose 21–36 to the Cheetahs in a warm-up match prior to the 2014 Super Rugby season.
- 28 January 2014: It is confirmed that Academy coach Mzwandile Stick would be the coach of the Eastern Province Kings during the 2014 Vodacom Cup competition.
- 1 February 2014: The Southern Kings lose 19–12 to the Lions in a Super Rugby warm-up match, while the Eastern Province Kings Vodacom Cup side draw 22–22 against 2013 SARU Community Cup champions GAP Despatch.
- 7 February 2014: The Southern Kings lose their final warm-up match 7–40 to the Stormers.
- 13 February 2014: The Eastern Province Kings are promoted to the Premier Division of the Currie Cup competition after it was announced that the competition will be expanded from six to eight teams.
- 17 February 2014: Kings CEO Charl Crous confirms that full-back Siviwe Soyizwapi joined Scott van Breda in signing for the Stormers on a loan deal, following injuries to Cheslin Kolbe and Jaco Taute.
- 20 February 2014: Kicking and specialist skills coach Carlos Spencer is also appointed as the head coach of the EP Kings for the 2014 Currie Cup Premier Division season.
- 26 February 2014: The Eastern Province Vodacom Cup side lost 46–8 to Griquas in a pre-season trial match.
- 4 March 2014: Siviwe Soyizwapi and Scott van Breda return from their loan spell at the Stormers to be named in the Eastern Province Kings side for their opening match of the 2014 Vodacom Cup season, against Kenyan side Simba XV in Cape Town.
- 5 March 2014: The Eastern Province Kings squad for the 2014 Vodacom Cup is published.
- 8 March 2014: The EP Kings lose 17–10 to Kenyan side Simba XV in the opening match of the 2014 Vodacom Cup. The Kings try scorers were Claude Tshidibi and Pieter Stemmet.
- 10 March 2014: Edinburgh Rugby announce that lock Izak van der Westhuizen will join the Eastern Province Kings prior to the 2014 Currie Cup Premier Division season.
- 15 March 2014: The EP Kings thrash Eastern Cape neighbours the Border Bulldogs 60–6 in a match played in Grahamstown. Masixole Banda and Brian Skosana both scored two tries, with Eben Barnard, Dwayne Kelly, Ivan-John du Preez, Selvyn Davids and Sonwabo Majola getting one each. Ntabeni Dukisa scored five conversions and a penalty while Dwayne Kelly also slotted a conversion. This result sees the Kings move up to fourth in the log.
- 22 March 2014: The EP Kings suffer a heavy defeat to Western Province to drop down to fifth position in the league. Tries from Michael Killian, Selvyn Davids and Kuhle Sonkosi, as well as seven points from the boot of Ntabeni Dukisa weren't enough as Western Province ran out 56–22 winners at the same venue of their Round One loss to Simba XV – City Park Stadium, Athlone.
- 26 March 2014: The Kings confirm three new signings for the 2014 Currie Cup Premier Division. Hooker Michael van Vuuren will join them from French Top 14 side Stade Français, along with two players from the Sharks – centre Tim Whitehead and utility back Hansie Graaff.
- 28 March 2014: The Welsh Rugby Union confirm that Wales will play a match against the Eastern Province Kings as preparation for their 2014 test series against South Africa. The match will take place at the Nelson Mandela Bay Stadium on 10 June 2014.
- 29 March 2014: The EP Kings suffer their third defeat of the 2014 Vodacom Cup season by losing 31–3 to the Free State XV in a match played in Cradock as part of the town's 200-year anniversary. George Whitehead scored the Kings' only points of the match when he opened the scoring with a fifth-minute penalty.
- 4 April 2014: A late drop goal from SWD Eagles fly-half Karlo Aspeling condemn the EP Kings to their third consecutive defeat and effectively out of contention for a quarter final spot. The SWD Eagles won 23–21 in George, leaving the Kings nine points off a top four spot with just two matches left to play. Ivan-John du Preez and Ntabeni Dukisa scored second-half tries for the Kings, with full-back Masixole Banda adding eleven points with the boot – one conversion and three penalties.
- 7 April 2014: The Kings confirm the signing of Free State Cheetahs scrum-half Kevin Luiters on a three-and-a-half-year deal.
- 8 April 2014: Former Kings winger Paul Perez arrives in Port Elizabeth ahead of joining the Kings for the 2014 Currie Cup Premier Division, pending a full recovery from a knee injury.
- 11 April 2014: The Eastern Province Kings record their first win in four matches, beating the Boland Cavaliers 28–21 at the Nelson Mandela Bay Stadium. The Kings were awarded a penalty try late in the first half, with Cameron Lindsay and Siphesihle Punguzwa adding two more in the second half. Ntabeni Dukisa converted two tries and scored three penalties to complete the scoring.
- 22 April 2014: Aidon Davis and Sergeal Petersen are included in the Baby Boks squad for the 2014 IRB Junior World Championship. However, results elsewhere confirmed that the Kings would not qualify for the Quarter Finals.
- 25 April 2014: The Kings end their 2014 Vodacom Cup campaign by winning 27–11 against the previously-undefeated Sharks XV in Durban. They scored three tries through Sergeal Petersen, Ntabeni Dukisa and Brian Skosana. Dukisa added another seven points by converting two tries and kicking a penalty and Kayle van Zyl converted the third try and also kicked a penalty to weigh in with five points. The result meant that the Kings consolidated fifth position in the Southern Section. Ntabeni Dukisa finished as top scorer for the competition with 50 points, while six players are tied in the top try-scoring charts with two tries apiece.
- 28 April 2014: Lock Rynier Bernardo joins Welsh Pro12 side Ospreys on a three-year deal. Another departure is winger Michael Killian, who announced his retirement from professional rugby.
- 13 May 2014: Fly-half Ntabeni Dukisa is another departure, joining the Boland Cavaliers, initially on a loan deal for the 2014 Currie Cup qualification tournament only.
- 14 May 2014: Two front-rowers join the Kings, with experienced Springbok prop CJ van der Linde undergoing test to prove his fitness prior to the 2014 Currie Cup Premier Division season and NMMU Madibaz hooker Martin Ferreira also at training, despite previous expectations that he would join the SWD Eagles.
- 20 May 2014: Leopards hooker Edgar Marutlulle, who played four matches for the Southern Kings during the 2013 Super Rugby season, also join in training sessions with the Eastern Province Kings. Meanwhile, scrum-half Dwayne Kelly join franchise partners SWD Eagles on a deal for the remainder of 2014.
- 21 May 2014: The Eastern Province Rugby Union officially announces the signings of CJ van der Linde until the end of 2014 and Edgar Marutlulle until the end of 2015.
- 26 May 2014: Winger/centre Brian Skosana leaves the Eastern Province Kings to join neighbours SWD Eagles until the end of 2015.
- 29 May 2014: Ntabeni Dukisa's very short loan spell at Boland Cavaliers ends as he returns to the Eastern Cape to be closer to his sick mother. Fullback Masixole Banda is named in the Border Bulldogs squad for the 2014 Currie Cup qualification competition.
- 3 June 2014: Another trio of new players are announced for the EP Kings – South African-born Italian international scrum-half Tobie Botes from Treviso, prop Tom Botha from French side Montpellier and Australian lock Steve Cummins from Shute Shield side Eastwood. All three players join the Kings for the duration of the Currie Cup competition only. The Boland Cavaliers winger Cheslyn Roberts also joined the Kings on a ten-day trial basis, while prop Pieter Stemmet joined the Pumas on loan.
- 10 June 2014: The EP Kings lose 12–34 to Wales in a tour match during their 2014 tour of South Africa.
- 13 June 2014: The side boost their lock options by re-signing David Bulbring from the Blue Bulls. Bulbring previously played first class rugby in Port Elizabeth in 2012 and 2013.
- 17 June 2014: The previously-announced transfer of lock Izak van der Westhuizen is cancelled after he failed a medical. Van der Westhuizen suffered three concussions since the start of 2014 and a specialist advised that he should not play rugby for six months to a year. Western Province and Stormers fly-half Gary van Aswegen also joins the Kings for a one-month trial period.
- 20 June 2014: The Southern Kings ran in ten tries as they beat a weakened Blue Bulls side 66–28 in a friendly match in Port Elizabeth.
- 25 June 2014: Another new recruit for the Kings is UCT Ikey Tigers lock/flanker Shaun McDonald, who joins the side on a deal for the duration of the 2014 Currie Cup Premier Division.
- 3 July 2014: The agent of Western Province lock Tazz Fuzani confirm that he would leave Cape Town at the end of the 2014 season and join the Kings on a two-year contract.
- 4 July 2014: The Southern Kings get yet another convincing victory as they scored seven tries in a 50–24 victory over the Sharks XV in another friendly match.
- 19 July 2014: The Eastern Province U18 side end the Craven Week as the top team by winning the unofficial final match, beating SWD U18 to win the tournament for the first time in 37 years.
- 21 July 2014: Henning van der Merwe is appointed as the new kicking coach for the Kings until 2017. He previously worked with the Leopards and NWU Pukke.
- 31 July 2014: The South African Schools side for 2014 is released. Four Eastern Province players that played at the Craven Week tournament are named in the squad – prop Lupumlo Mguca, loose-forward Junior Pokomela, fly-half Curwin Bosch and fullback Keanu Vers.
- 19 August 2014: Centre Heino Bezuidenhout is also called up to the South African Schools team as a replacement for Morné Joubert.

== Players ==
=== Player movements ===
In
Date	Player Name	From	Reference
PR	Simon Kerrod	Sharks / NMMU Madibaz	
PR	Vukile Sofisa	Eastern Province U21	
PR	BG Uys	Leopards	
HK	Tabbie du Plessis		
HK	Lumko Mbane	African Bombers	
HK	Michael van Vuuren	Stade Français	
LK	Louis Fourie	NMMU Madibaz	
LK	Brendan Hector	Eastern Province U21	
LK	Ben Jacobs	Eastern Province U21	
LK	Kevin Kaba	Eastern Province U21	
LK	Cameron Lindsay	NMMU Madibaz	
LK	Izak van der Westhuizen	Edinburgh	
FL	Ivan-John du Preez	Stellenbosch Rugby Academy	
FL	Tyler Paul	Eastern Province U19	
FL	Siphesihle Punguzwa	Eastern Province U21	
FL	Claude Tshidibi	Eastern Province U21	
FL	CJ Velleman	Eastern Province U19	
SH	Jaco Grobler	Leopards	
SH	Kalvano King	Trying Stars	
SH	Kevin Luiters	Free State Cheetahs	
SH	Sonwabo Majola	Eastern Province U21	
SH	Kevin Plaatjies	SAPS	
FH	Morné Hugo	TUT Vikings	
FH	MC Venter	Falcons U19	
CE	Michael Bernardt	Sharks U21 / NMMU Madibaz	
CE	Selvyn Davids	Eastern Province U19	
CE	Dwayne Jenner	Border Bulldogs	
CE	Luan Nieuwoudt	Eastern Province U19	
CE	Tim Whitehead	Sharks	
WG	Aya Dlepu	Eastern Province U21 / NMMU Madibaz	
WG	Lance Louw	Rosebuds	
WG	Sphu Msutwana	Eastern Province U21	
FB	Masixole Banda	African Bombers	
FB	Hansie Graaff	Sharks	
FB	Malcolm Jaer	Eastern Province Craven Week squad	
Out
Position	Player Name	To	Reference
PR	Kevin Buys	CA Brive	
PR	Jaco Engels	Wanderers	
PR	Zolani Faku	UCT Ikey Tigers	
PR	Schalk Ferreira	Toulouse	
PR	Ross Geldenhuys	Waitohi	
PR	Marzuq Maarman	NMMU Madibaz	
PR	Sphephelo Mayaba	Released	
PR	Thabiso Mngomezulu	Released	
PR	Enoch Mnyaka	NMMU Madibaz	
HK	Boetie Britz	Released	
HK	Bobby Dyer	Returned to Despatch	
HK	Hannes Franklin	SWD Eagles	
HK	Virgile Lacombe	Racing Métro	
HK	Bandise Maku	Blue Bulls	
HK	Madoda Yako	Spring Rose	
LK	Daniel Adongo	Indianapolis Colts	
LK	David Bulbring	Blue Bulls	
LK	Armand du Preez	Not named in squad	
LK	Samora Fihlani	Not named in squad	
LK	Thabo Mamojele	Golden Lions	
LK	Schalk Oelofse	SWD Eagles	
LK	Wayne van Heerden	Retired	
LK	Mzwanele Zito	SWD Eagles	
FL	Dalton Davis	Griquas	
FL	Cornell du Preez	Edinburgh	
FL	Jacques Engelbrecht	Blue Bulls	
FL	Renier Erasmus	Despatch	
FL	Heinrich Leonard	Not named in squad	
FL	Tomás Leonardi	S.I.C.	
FL	Siya Mangaliso	Not named in squad	
FL	Mpho Mbiyozo	Released	
FL	Kuselo Moyake	Baie Mare	
FL	Wimpie van der Walt	NTT DoCoMo Red Hurricanes	
SH	Boela Abrahams	Griquas	
SH	Scott Mathie	Retired	
SH	Nicolás Vergallo	Lyon	
FH	Demetri Catrakilis	Western Province	
FH	Wesley Dunlop	US Montauban	
CE	Waylon Murray	Blue Bulls	
CE	Hadleigh Parkes	Auckland	
CE	Wayne Stevens	Griquas	
CE	Andries Strauss	Edinburgh	
WG	Norman Nelson	Griffons	
WG	Yamkela Ngam	NMMU Madibaz	
WG	Marcello Sampson	Pumas	
WG	Andile Witbooi	Released	
FB	SP Marais	Sharks	

- SWD Eagles players Johan Herbst, Grant Kemp and Elric van Vuuren, Leopards player Edgar Marutlulle and Pumas player Shaun Venter were part of the Southern Kings Super Rugby squad, but not contracted to the Eastern Province Kings. They returned to their provinces after the 2013 Super Rugby season.

== Vodacom Cup ==
=== Log ===
2014 Vodacom Cup Southern Section log
Pos	Team	Pld	W	D	L	PF	PA	PD	TF	TA	TB	LB	Pts	Qualification
1	Sharks XV	7	6	0	1	215	120	+95	25	14	3	0	27	Quarter-finals
2	Free State XV	7	5	0	2	279	148	+131	40	17	5	1	26	Quarter-finals
3	SWD Eagles	7	5	0	2	240	164	+76	32	20	4	1	25	Quarter-finals
4	Western Province	7	5	0	2	215	138	+77	32	16	3	0	23	Quarter-finals
5	Eastern Province Kings	7	3	0	4	171	165	+6	22	20	1	2	15	
6	Boland Cavaliers	7	2	0	5	158	197	−39	20	26	2	1	11	
7	Simba XV	7	1	0	6	102	285	−183	14	45	1	2	7	
8	Border Bulldogs	7	1	0	6	124	287	−163	15	42	1	0	5	

Rules for classification:
- 4 points for a win
- 2 points for a draw
- 1 bonus point for a loss by seven points or less
- 1 bonus point for scoring four or more tries in a match

=== Round-by-round ===
Team Progression – 2014 Vodacom Cup Southern Section
Team	R1	R2	R3	R4	R5	R6	R7
Opposition	SIM	BDR	WPr	FSt	SWD	BOL	SHA
Cumulative Points	1	6	6	6	7	11	15
Southern Section Position	6th	4th	5th	5th	5th	5th	5th
Key:	win	draw	loss				

=== Results ===
8 March 2014	Simba XV	17–10	Eastern Province Kings	City Park Stadium, Athlone
15:00	Try: Leonard Mugaisi 11', 46'; Max Adaka 49'; Con: Kenny Andola 46' (1/3); Pen: Kenny Andola (0/2); Cards: Wilson Kopondo (yellow card) 32' (red card) 42'; Edwin Achayo (yellow card) 65' to 75'; Max Adaka (yellow card) 74'	Report; Scoreboard	Try: Claude Tshidibi 2'; Pieter Stemmet 74'; Con: Scott van Breda (0/2); Cards: Vukile Sofisa (yellow card) 37' to 47'	Attendance: 600; Referee: Rodney Boneparte

15 March 2014	Eastern Province Kings	60–6	Border Bulldogs	Rhodes Great Field, Grahamstown
15:00	Try: Eben Barnard 4', 44'; Masixole Banda 22', 27'; Brian Skosana 24'; Dwayne Kelly 39'; Ivan-John du Preez 72'; Selvyn Davids 75'; Sonwabo Majola 77'; Con: Ntabeni Dukisa 5', 23', 25', 40', 76' (5/8); Dwayne Kelly 78' (1/1); Pen: Ntabeni Dukisa 14' (1/2)	Report; Scoreboard	Pen: Jeff Taljard 2', 8' (2/2); Cards: Lolo Waka (yellow card) 13' to 23'	Attendance: 1,200; Referee: Pro Legoete

22 March 2014	Western Province	56–22	Eastern Province Kings	City Park Stadium, Athlone
15:30	Try: Rayn Smid 7', 15', 35'; JP Lewis 31'; Sikhumbuzo Notshe 52'; Rohan Kitshoff 65'; Kyle Lombard 75'; Devon Williams 79'; Con: Gary van Aswegen 32', 36', 53', 66', 80' (5/7); Janco Gunter (0/1); Pen: Gary van Aswegen 26', 45' (2/2)	Report; Scoreboard	Try: Michael Killian 11'; Selvyn Davids 41'; Kuhle Sonkosi 56'; Con: Ntabeni Dukisa 12', 57' (2/3); Pen: Ntabeni Dukisa 22' (1/1); Cards: Vukile Sofisa (yellow card) 70'	Referee: Rodney Boneparte

29 March 2014	Eastern Province Kings	3–31	Free State XV	Cradock Rovers Field, Cradock
16:00	Pen: George Whitehead 5' (1/1)	Report; Scoreboard	Try: Oupa Mohojé 27'; Nico Lee 59'; Alvin Brandt 72', 81'; Con: Niel Marais 28', 60', 73', 82' (4/4); Pen: Niel Marais 37' (1/1)	Referee: Jaco van Heerden

4 April 2014	SWD Eagles	23–21	Eastern Province Kings	Outeniqua Park, George
19:00	Try: Alshaun Bock 69'; Shaun Raubenheimer 76'; Con: Karlo Aspeling 69', 76' (2/2); Pen: Karlo Aspeling 2', 10' (2/2); Drop: Karlo Aspeling 78' (1/1); Cards: Hannes Franklin (yellow card) 23' to 33'; Schalk Oelofse (yellow card) 57' to 67'	Report; Scoreboard	Try: Ivan-John du Preez 44'; Ntabeni Dukisa 59'; Con: Masixole Banda 45' (1/2); Pen: Masixole Banda 17', 22', 29' (3/3); Drop: Masixole Banda (0/1); Cards: Lizo Gqoboka (yellow card) 68' to 77'	Attendance: 1,235; Referee: Ben Crouse

11 April 2014	Eastern Province Kings	28–21	Boland Cavaliers	Nelson Mandela Bay Stadium, Port Elizabeth
19:10	Try: penalty try 39'; Cameron Lindsay 45'; Siphesihle Punguzwa 79'; Con: Ntabeni Dukisa 39', 46' (2/3); Pen: Ntabeni Dukisa 18', 52', 61' (3/4)	Report; Scoreboard	Try: JC Astle 23'; Harlon Klaasen 53'; Con: Christian Rust 54' (1/2); Pen: Christian Rust 8', 43', 60' (3/3); Cards: Martin Dreyer (yellow card) 33' to 43'	Attendance: 0 Referee: Juan Sylvestre

25 April 2014	Sharks XV	11–27	Eastern Province Kings	Kings Park Stadium, Durban
16:30	Try: Sizo Maseko 11'; Con: Jean-Luc du Plessis (0/1); Pen: André Esterhuizen (0/1); Jean-Luc du Plessis 23', 49' (2/2)	Scoreboard	Try: Sergeal Petersen 19'; Ntabeni Dukisa 38'; Brian Skosana 71'; Con: Ntabeni Dukisa 19', 39' (2/2); Kayle van Zyl 72' (1/1); Pen: Ntabeni Dukisa 47' (1/3); Kayle van Zyl 53' (1/1)	Referee: Shaun Veldsman

=== Player statistics ===
The following table shows players statistics for the 2014 Vodacom Cup season:

Player Statistics – 2014 Vodacom Cup
Player	Starts	Used Sub	Unused Sub	Points	Tries	Cons	Pens	DGs	YC	RC
Lizo Gqoboka	4	1	0	0	0	0	0	0	1	0
Simon Kerrod	0	2	0	0	0	0	0	0	0	0
Brenden Olivier	3	0	0	0	0	0	0	0	0	0
Vukile Sofisa	4	1	0	0	0	0	0	0	2	0
Pieter Stemmet	3	2	0	5	1	0	0	0	0	0
BG Uys	0	1	0	0	0	0	0	0	0	0
Albé de Swardt	7	0	0	0	0	0	0	0	0	0
Tabbie du Plessis	0	3	0	0	0	0	0	0	0	0
Dane van der Westhuyzen	0	4	0	0	0	0	0	0	0	0
Rynier Bernardo	2	0	0	0	0	0	0	0	0	0
Aidon Davis	3	2	0	0	0	0	0	0	0	0
Louis Fourie	2	0	0	0	0	0	0	0	0	0
Brendan Hector	2	0	0	0	0	0	0	0	0	0
Cameron Lindsay	3	0	0	5	1	0	0	0	0	0
Tyler Paul	0	3	1	0	0	0	0	0	0	0
Kuhle Sonkosi	2	0	0	5	1	0	0	0	0	0
Thembelani Bholi	7	0	0	0	0	0	0	0	0	0
Ivan-John du Preez	3	2	0	10	2	0	0	0	0	0
Siphesihle Punguzwa	1	5	0	5	1	0	0	0	0	0
Paul Schoeman	2	0	0	0	0	0	0	0	0	0
Claude Tshidibi	1	0	0	5	1	0	0	0	0	0
CJ Velleman	2	1	0	0	0	0	0	0	0	0
Stefan Willemse	2	0	0	0	0	0	0	0	0	0
Stephan Zaayman	3	0	0	0	0	0	0	0	0	0
Jaco Grobler	1	0	0	0	0	0	0	0	0	0
Dwayne Kelly	5	1	0	7	1	1	0	0	0	0
Kayle van Zyl	0	3	0	5	0	1	1	0	0	0
Kalvano King	1	0	0	0	0	0	0	0	0	0
Sonwabo Majola	0	3	0	5	1	0	0	0	0	0
Ntabeni Dukisa	6	1	0	50	2	11	6	0	0	0
Morné Hugo	0	2	0	0	0	0	0	0	0	0
George Whitehead	1	0	0	3	0	0	1	0	0	0
Michael Bernardt	2	0	0	0	0	0	0	0	0	0
Selvyn Davids	1	3	0	10	2	0	0	0	0	0
Andile Jho	3	0	0	0	0	0	0	0	0	0
Tiger Mangweni	3	1	0	0	0	0	0	0	0	0
Luan Nieuwoudt	1	0	0	0	0	0	0	0	0	0
Scott van Breda	1	0	0	0	0	0	0	0	0	0
Eben Barnard	5	0	0	10	2	0	0	0	0	0
Ofentse Boloko	2	0	0	0	0	0	0	0	0	0
Michael Killian	1	0	0	5	1	0	0	0	0	0
Lance Louw	3	0	0	0	0	0	0	0	0	0
Sphu Msutwana	0	4	0	0	0	0	0	0	0	0
Sergeal Petersen	2	0	0	5	1	0	0	0	0	0
Brian Skosana	4	3	0	10	2	0	0	0	0	0
Masixole Banda	5	0	0	21	2	1	3	0	0	0
Malcolm Jaer	1	0	0	0	0	0	0	0	0	0
Siviwe Soyizwapi	1	0	0	0	0	0	0	0	0	0
penalty try	0	0	0	5	1	0	0	0	0	0

- Tim Agaba, Ronnie Cooke, Aya Dlepu, Charl du Plessis, Shane Gates, Siyanda Grey, Ben Jacobs, Dwayne Jenner, Kevin Kaba, Lumko Mbane, Darron Nell, Foxy Ntleki, Devin Oosthuizen, Kevin Plaatjies, Steven Sykes, Marlou van Niekerk, MC Venter and Luke Watson were named in the 2014 Vodacom Cup squad, but never included in a matchday 22.

=== Player appearances ===
The following players appeared for the Eastern Province Kings during the 2014 Vodacom Cup:

Player Appearances – 2014 Vodacom Cup
Player	SIM	BDR	WPr	FSt	SWD	BOL	SHA
Brenden Olivier	1	1	1				
Albé de Swardt	2	2	2	2	2	2	2
Vukile Sofisa	3	3	3	3	17 (substituted on)		
Kuhle Sonkosi	4		4				
Brendan Hector	5		5				
Thembelani Bholi	6	6	6	6	6	6	6
Claude Tshidibi	7						
Stephan Zaayman	8	5		4			
Kalvano King	9						
Ntabeni Dukisa	10	10	10	22 (substituted on)	10	10	10
Lance Louw	11	11	11				
Tiger Mangweni	12	12	12		20 (substituted on)		
Scott van Breda	13						
Eben Barnard	14	14			14	14	14
Siviwe Soyizwapi	15						
Tabbie du Plessis	16 (substituted on)	16 (substituted on)	16 (substituted on)				
Pieter Stemmet	17 (substituted on)	17 (substituted on)			3	3	3
Ivan-John du Preez	18 (substituted on)	8	8		8		19 (substituted on)
Siphesihle Punguzwa	19 (substituted on)	19 (substituted on)		19 (substituted on)	19 (substituted on)	19 (substituted on)	7
Dwayne Kelly	20 (substituted on)	9	9		9	9	9
Brian Skosana	21 (substituted on)	13	13	13	13	22 (substituted on)	22 (substituted on)
Selvyn Davids	22 (substituted on)	22 (substituted on)	22 (substituted on)	11			
Rynier Bernardo		4		5			
CJ Velleman		7	19 (substituted on)		7		
Masixole Banda		15	15	15	15	15	
Aidon Davis		18 (substituted on)	18 (substituted on)	8		8	8
Sonwabo Majola		20 (substituted on)	20 (substituted on)	20 (substituted on)			
Sphu Msutwana		21 (substituted on)	21 (substituted on)	21 (substituted on)	21 (substituted on)		
Paul Schoeman			7	7			
Michael Killian			14				
Lizo Gqoboka			17 (substituted on)	1	1	1	1
Jaco Grobler				9			
George Whitehead				10			
Luan Nieuwoudt				12			
Sergeal Petersen				14			11
Dane van der Westhuyzen				16 (substituted on)	16 (substituted on)	16 (substituted on)	16 (substituted on)
BG Uys				17 (substituted on)			
Tyler Paul				18 (substituted on)	18 (substituted on)	18 (substituted on)	18
Louis Fourie					4	4	
Cameron Lindsay					5	5	5
Ofentse Boloko					11	11	
Andile Jho					12	12	12
Kayle van Zyl					22 (substituted on)	20 (substituted on)	20 (substituted on)
Stefan Willemse						7	4
Michael Bernardt						13	13
Simon Kerrod						17 (substituted on)	17 (substituted on)
Morné Hugo						21 (substituted on)	21 (substituted on)
Malcolm Jaer							15

- Tim Agaba, Ronnie Cooke, Aya Dlepu, Charl du Plessis, Shane Gates, Siyanda Grey, Ben Jacobs, Dwayne Jenner, Kevin Kaba, Lumko Mbane, Darron Nell, Foxy Ntleki, Devin Oosthuizen, Kevin Plaatjies, Steven Sykes, Marlou van Niekerk, MC Venter and Luke Watson were named in the 2014 Vodacom Cup squad, but never included in a matchday 22.

== International match ==
The Eastern Province Kings also hosted Wales in a warm-up match during their 2014 test series against South Africa.

10 June 2014	Eastern Province Kings	12–34	Wales	Nelson Mandela Bay Stadium, Port Elizabeth
19:00	Try: Siviwe Soyizwapi 57'; Simon Kerrod 79'; Con: George Whitehead 80' (1/2)	Report; Scoreboard	Try: Josh Turnbull 10'; Cory Allen 15'; James Hook 45'; Alex Cuthbert 47'; Gareth Davies 62'; Con: James Hook 11', 16', 46' (3/5); Pen: James Hook 40' (1/1); Cards: Rhodri Jones (yellow card) 21' to 32'	Attendance: 11,828; Referee: Lourens van der Merwe

== Currie Cup ==
=== Log ===
The final log of the round-robin stage of the 2014 Currie Cup Premier Division is:

2014 Currie Cup Premier Division log
Pos	Team	Pld	W	D	L	PF	PA	PD	TF	TA	TB	LB	Pts	Qualification
1	Western Province	10	8	0	2	335	206	+129	40	23	6	1	39	Semi-finals
2	Golden Lions	10	7	0	3	362	206	+156	44	21	7	1	36	Semi-finals
3	Sharks	10	7	1	2	287	222	+65	26	20	2	1	33	Semi-finals
4	Blue Bulls	10	6	0	4	271	235	+36	27	23	3	1	28	Semi-finals
5	Free State Cheetahs	10	3	1	6	249	294	−45	28	33	4	3	21	
6	Pumas	10	4	0	6	237	269	−32	25	28	2	2	20	
7	Griquas	10	3	0	7	220	332	−112	25	41	2	2	16	2015 Currie Cup qualification
8	Eastern Province Kings	10	1	0	9	206	403	−197	27	53	1	1	6 (Note: The Blue Bulls, Eastern Province Kings, Free State Cheetahs, Golden Lions, Sharks and Western Province are exempt from relegation.)	

Rules for classification: 4 points for a win; 2 points for a draw; 1 bonus point for a loss by seven points or less; 1 bonus point for scoring four or more tries in a match

=== Round-by-round ===
Team Progression – 2014 Currie Cup Premier Division
Team	R1	R2	R3	R4	R5	R6	R7	R8	R9	R10
Opposition	WPr	LIO	BUL	LIO	WPr	BUL	FSC	SHA	GRQ	PMA
Cumulative Points	0	0	1	1	1	1	1	1	1	6
Position	7th	8th	8th	8th	8th	8th	8th	8th	8th	8th
Key:	win	draw	loss							

=== Results ===
Section X	8 August 2014	Eastern Province Kings	16–35	Western Province	Nelson Mandela Bay Stadium, Port Elizabeth
	19:10	Try: Luke Watson 33'; Kevin Luiters 68'; Con: Scott van Breda (0/2); Pen: Scott van Breda 15', 18' (2/2)	Report; Scoreboard	Try: Patrick Howard 7'; Nizaam Carr 45'; Michael van der Spuy 55'; Cheslin Kolbe 83'; Con: Demetri Catrakilis 8', 46', 56' (3/3); Robert du Preez (0/1); Pen: Demetri Catrakilis 20', 52', 60' (3/3); Cards: Manuel Carizza (yellow card) 18' to 28'; Pat Cilliers (yellow card) 27' to 37'; Seabelo Senatla (yellow card) 65' to 75'	Attendance: 20,564; Referee: Jaco Peyper

Section X	16 August 2014	Golden Lions	60–19	Eastern Province Kings	Ellis Park Stadium, Johannesburg
	14:30	Try: Stokkies Hanekom 5'; Jaco Kriel 23', 38'; Ruan Combrinck 29'; Robbie Coetzee 44'; Derick Minnie 52'; Willie Britz 61'; Andries Coetzee 67'; Kwagga Smith 82'; Con: Jaco van der Walt 6', 45', 53', 62', 68', 83' (6/9); Pen: Jaco van der Walt 36' (1/2)	Report; Scoreboard	Try: Ronnie Cooke 2'; Aidon Davis 59'; Scott van Breda 70'; Con: Gary van Aswegen 3' (1/1); George Whitehead (0/1); Scott van Breda 71' (1/1); Pen: Gary van Aswegen (0/1); Cards: Thembelani Bholi (yellow card) 22'	Attendance: 5,955; Referee: Craig Joubert

Section X	23 August 2014	Blue Bulls	30–25	Eastern Province Kings	Loftus Versfeld, Pretoria
	15:00	Try: Deon Stegmann 15'; Akona Ndungane 55', 59'; Jesse Kriel 63'; Con: Tony Jantjies 60', 64' (2/3); Jesse Kriel (0/1); Pen: Tony Jantjies 6', 27' (2/4); Cards: Tony Jantjies (yellow card) 45' to 56'	Report; Scoreboard	Try: Shane Gates 7'; Lizo Gqoboka 42'; Michael van Vuuren 65'; Con: Scott van Breda 43', 66' (2/3); Pen: Scott van Breda 37', 50' (2/2); Cards: Michael van Vuuren (yellow card) 54' to 65'	Attendance: 5,219; Referee: Pro Legoete

Section X	30 August 2014	Eastern Province Kings	22–41	Golden Lions	Nelson Mandela Bay Stadium, Port Elizabeth
	19:10	Try: penalty try 28'; Shane Gates 32'; Siviwe Soyizwapi 39'; Con: Scott van Breda 29', 33' (2/3); Drop: George Whitehead 45' (1/1)	Report; Scoreboard	Try: Jaco Kriel 3'; Ruan Dreyer 17'; Schalk van der Merwe 36'; Franco Mostert 70'; Derick Minnie 80'; Con: Ruan Combrinck 4', 18', 37', 71', 81' (5/5); Pen: Ruan Combrinck 60', 64' (2/2); Cards: Lionel Mapoe (yellow card) 28' to 38'; Ross Cronjé (yellow card) 73'	Attendance: 9,034; Referee: Marius van der Westhuizen

Section X	5 September 2014	Western Province	49–14	Eastern Province Kings	Newlands Stadium, Cape Town
	19:10	Try: Juan de Jongh 11', 22'; Siya Kolisi 17', 78'; Cheslin Kolbe 48'; Kobus van Wyk 58'; Rynhardt Elstadt 72'; Con: Demetri Catrakilis 12', 18', 23', 49', 59' (5/5); Kurt Coleman 73', 79' (2/2); Pen: Demetri Catrakilis (0/1); Cards: Rynhardt Elstadt (yellow card) 57' to 67'	Report; Scoreboard	Try: Paul Schoeman 30'; Tim Whitehead 81'; Con: Scott van Breda 31', 82' (2/2); Pen: Scott van Breda (0/1); Cards: David Bulbring (yellow card) 70' to 80'	Attendance: 11,210; Referee: Stuart Berry

Section X	12 September 2014	Eastern Province Kings	13–28	Blue Bulls	Nelson Mandela Bay Stadium, Port Elizabeth
	19:10	Try: Darron Nell 82'; Con: Tobie Botes 83' (1/1); Pen: Scott van Breda 29', 33' (2/3); Cards: David Bulbring (yellow card) 68' to 78'	Report; Scoreboard	Try: William Small-Smith 24'; Bjorn Basson 46'; Deon Stegmann 64'; Con: Jacques-Louis Potgieter 47', 65' (2/3); Pen: Jacques-Louis Potgieter 8', 40', 60' (3/3); Drop: Jacques-Louis Potgieter (0/1); Cards: Bongi Mbonambi (yellow card) 12' to 22'; Deon Stegmann (red card) 69'	Attendance: 13,400; Referee: Quinton Immelman

Cross-Section	20 September 2014	Eastern Province Kings	22–37	Free State Cheetahs	Nelson Mandela Bay Stadium, Port Elizabeth
	15:00	Try: Ntabeni Dukisa 31'; Siyanda Grey 55'; Dwayne Jenner 77'; Con: Gary van Aswegen 32' (1/2); Scott van Breda 78' (1/1); Pen: Gary van Aswegen 22' (1/1); Cards: Martin Ferreira (yellow card) 33' to 46'; Darron Nell (yellow card) 52' to 62'	Report; Scoreboard	Try: Francois Venter 29'; Sarel Pretorius 44'; Willie du Plessis 60'; Raymond Rhule 71'; Con: Willie du Plessis 30', 45', 61' (3/3); Pieter-Steyn de Wet 72' (1/1); Pen: Willie du Plessis 7', 15', 39' (3/4)	Attendance: 5,988; Referee: Marius Jonker

Cross-Section	27 September 2014	Sharks	53–24	Eastern Province Kings	Kings Park Stadium, Durban
	14:00	Try: Lourens Adriaanse 7'; Lwazi Mvovo 19'; André Esterhuizen 23'; Lionel Cronjé 32'; Paul Jordaan 54', 78'; Stephan Lewies 77'; Con: Lionel Cronjé 8', 20', 24', 33', 78', 79' (6/7); Pen: Lionel Cronjé 11', 49' (2/3)	Report; Scoreboard	Try: Paul Schoeman 37'; Shane Gates 43'; Tim Whitehead 52'; Con: Gary van Aswegen 38', 44', 53' (3/3); Pen: Gary van Aswegen 12' (1/1); Cards: Martin Ferreira (yellow card) 17' to 28'	Attendance: 8,718; Referee: Ben Crouse

Cross-Section	4 October 2014	Griquas	45–25	Eastern Province Kings	Griqua Park, Kimberley
	14:30	Try: Marnus Schoeman 7', 58', 65'; Martin Bezuidenhout 32'; Janro van Niekerk 56'; PJ Vermeulen 67', 75'; Con: Gouws Prinsloo 8', 33' (2/2); Dean Grant 59', 66', 68' (3/4); Jacquin Jansen (0/1); Cards: Marnus Schoeman (yellow card) 19' to 29'	Report; Scoreboard	Try: penalty try 18'; Shane Gates 73', 80'; Con: Gary van Aswegen 19' (1/1); Ntabeni Dukisa (0/1); George Whitehead 81' (1/1); Pen: Gary van Aswegen 14', 28' (2/2); Cards: Shane Gates (yellow card) 55' to 66'	Attendance: 1,000; Referee: Stuart Berry

Cross-Section	10 October 2014	Eastern Province Kings	26–25	Pumas	Nelson Mandela Bay Stadium, Port Elizabeth
	19:10	Try: Tobie Botes 13'; Ronnie Cooke 21'; Paul Schoeman 28'; Scott van Breda 74'; Con: Gary van Aswegen 22', 29', 75' (3/4); Pen: Scott van Breda (0/1); Gary van Aswegen (0/2)	Report; Scoreboard	Try: Frank Herne 36'; Justin van Staden 40'; Stefan Watermeyer 45'; Con: Justin van Staden 37', 40' (2/3); Pen: Justin van Staden 16', 65' (2/2); Drop: JW Jonker (0/1); Cards: Giant Mtyanda (yellow card) 12' to 22'; Roscko Speckman (yellow card) 27' to 37'	Referee: Marius Jonker

=== Player statistics ===
The following table shows players statistics for the 2014 Currie Cup Premier Division season:

Player Statistics – 2014 Currie Cup Premier Division
Player	Starts	Used Sub	Unused Sub	Points	Tries	Cons	Pens	DGs	YC	RC
Tom Botha	6	0	0	0	0	0	0	0	0	0
Charl du Plessis	0	3	0	0	0	0	0	0	0	0
Lizo Gqoboka	6	1	0	5	1	0	0	0	0	0
Simon Kerrod	1	1	0	0	0	0	0	0	0	0
Charles Marais	2	2	0	0	0	0	0	0	0	0
BG Uys	2	1	0	0	0	0	0	0	0	0
CJ van der Linde	3	4	0	0	0	0	0	0	0	0
Albé de Swardt	0	5	0	0	0	0	0	0	0	0
Martin Ferreira	4	0	0	0	0	0	0	0	2	0
Edgar Marutlulle	6	1	0	0	0	0	0	0	0	0
Michael van Vuuren	0	4	0	5	1	0	0	0	1	0
David Bulbring	6	0	0	0	0	0	0	0	2	0
Steve Cummins	4	3	0	0	0	0	0	0	0	0
Cameron Lindsay	2	1	0	0	0	0	0	0	0	0
Darron Nell	3	2	1	5	1	0	0	0	1	0
Steven Sykes	5	1	0	0	0	0	0	0	0	0
Thembelani Bholi	3	4	1	0	0	0	0	0	1	0
Shaun McDonald	3	2	0	0	0	0	0	0	0	0
Devin Oosthuizen	5	0	0	0	0	0	0	0	0	0
Paul Schoeman	8	0	0	15	3	0	0	0	0	0
Stefan Willemse	4	4	0	0	0	0	0	0	0	0
Tim Agaba	2	1	0	0	0	0	0	0	0	0
Aidon Davis	3	1	0	5	1	0	0	0	0	0
Luke Watson	2	0	0	5	1	0	0	0	0	0
Tobie Botes	5	3	1	7	1	1	0	0	0	0
Jaco Grobler	0	3	0	0	0	0	0	0	0	0
Kevin Luiters	5	3	0	5	1	0	0	0	0	0
Ntabeni Dukisa	3	3	2	5	1	0	0	0	0	0
Gary van Aswegen	8	0	0	30	0	9	4	0	0	0
George Whitehead	2	2	2	5	0	1	0	1	0	0
Ronnie Cooke	10	0	0	10	2	0	0	0	0	0
Shane Gates	9	1	0	25	5	0	0	0	1	0
Dwayne Jenner	1	1	1	5	1	0	0	0	0	0
Tim Whitehead	8	0	0	10	2	0	0	0	0	0
Siyanda Grey	2	1	1	5	1	0	0	0	0	0
Siviwe Soyizwapi	10	0	0	5	1	0	0	0	0	0
Scott van Breda	7	1	2	44	2	8	6	0	0	0

- Enrico Acker, Eben Barnard, Hansie Graaff, Brenden Olivier, Paul Perez, Sergeal Petersen, Dane van der Westhuyzen and Marlou van Niekerk were named in the 2014 Currie Cup squad, but never included in a matchday 22.

=== Player appearances ===
Player Appearances – 2014 Currie Cup Premier Division
Player	WPr	LIO	BUL	LIO	WPr	BUL	FSC	SHA	GRQ	PMA
Lizo Gqoboka	1	1	1		1	1	1			18 (substituted on)
Edgar Marutlulle	2	2	2	2	2	2				16 (substituted on)
Tom Botha	3	3	3	3	3		3			
Steve Cummins	4	4	18 (substituted on)				18 (substituted on)	4	5	19 (substituted on)
David Bulbring	5	5	5	5	5	5				
Thembelani Bholi	6	6	19 (substituted on)	6	19 (substituted on)			19 (substituted on)	19 (substituted on)	20
Stefan Willemse	7	7	6	19 (substituted on)	18 (substituted on)	20 (substituted on)	19 (substituted on)	6		
Luke Watson	8		8							
Tobie Botes	9	9		20	20 (substituted on)	21 (substituted on)	20 (substituted on)	9	9	9
Gary van Aswegen	10	10	10			10	10	10	10	10
Siviwe Soyizwapi	11	11	11	11	11	11	15	15	15	11
Shane Gates	12	12	12	12	21 (substituted on)	12	12	12	12	12
Tim Whitehead	13	13	13		13	13		13	13	13
Ronnie Cooke	14	14	14	13	14	14	13	14	14	14
Scott van Breda	15	15	15	15	15	15	22 (substituted on)	22	22	15
Albé de Swardt	16 (substituted on)	16 (substituted on)					16 (substituted on)	16 (substituted on)	16 (substituted on)	
CJ van der Linde	17 (substituted on)	17 (substituted on)			17 (substituted on)	3	17 (substituted on)	3	3	
Darron Nell	18 (substituted on)					19 (substituted on)	5	5	18	4
Aidon Davis	19 (substituted on)	8		8	8					
Kevin Luiters	20 (substituted on)		9	9	9	9	9	21 (substituted on)	20 (substituted on)	
George Whitehead	21	21 (substituted on)	21	10	10				21 (substituted on)	
Ntabeni Dukisa	22	22 (substituted on)		22		22 (substituted on)	11	11	11	22 (substituted on)
Steven Sykes		18 (substituted on)	4	4	4	4	4			
Shaun McDonald		19 (substituted on)		18 (substituted on)	6	6	6			
Jaco Grobler		20 (substituted on)	20 (substituted on)							21 (substituted on)
Paul Schoeman			7	7	7	8	8	8	6	6
Michael van Vuuren			16 (substituted on)	16 (substituted on)	16 (substituted on)	16 (substituted on)				
Charles Marais			17 (substituted on)	17 (substituted on)				1	1	
Siyanda Grey			22 (substituted on)	14	22		14			
BG Uys				1		18 (substituted on)				3
Dwayne Jenner				21	12		21 (substituted on)			
Devin Oosthuizen						7	7	7	7	7
Simon Kerrod						17 (substituted on)				1
Martin Ferreira							2	2	2	2
Charl du Plessis								17 (substituted on)	17 (substituted on)	17 (substituted on)
Cameron Lindsay								18 (substituted on)	4	5
Tim Agaba								20 (substituted on)	8	8

- Enrico Acker, Eben Barnard, Hansie Graaff, Brenden Olivier, Paul Perez, Sergeal Petersen, Dane van der Westhuyzen and Marlou van Niekerk were named in the 2014 Currie Cup squad, but never included in a matchday 22.

== Southern Kings ==
=== Results ===
The Southern Kings lost their Super Rugby status at the end of the 2013 Super Rugby season, but lined up some friendly fixtures against other South African Super Rugby franchises prior to the 2014 Super Rugby season:

25 January 2014	Southern Kings	21–36	Cheetahs	Nelson Mandela Bay Stadium, Port Elizabeth
17:00	Try: Siviwe Soyizwapi; Ronnie Cooke; Con: George Whitehead		Try: Jean Cook; Boom Prinsloo; Adriaan Strauss; Raymond Rhule; Con: Elgar Watts; Johan Goosen	Referee: Jason Jaftha

1 February 2014	Southern Kings	12–19	Lions	Nelson Mandela Bay Stadium, Port Elizabeth
15:00	Try: Sergeal Petersen penalty try Con: George Whitehead		Try: Jaco Kriel; Derick Minnie; Robbie Coetzee; Con: Marnitz Boshoff	Referee: Jason Jaftha

7 February 2014	Southern Kings	7–40	Stormers	Nelson Mandela Bay Stadium, Port Elizabeth
19:30	Try: Paul Schoeman; Con: George Whitehead		Try: Nic Groom; Siya Kolisi; Deon Fourie; Con: Demetri Catrakilis; Gary van Aswegen	Referee: Stuart Berry

21 June 2014	Southern Kings	66–28	Blue Bulls	Nelson Mandela Bay Stadium, Port Elizabeth
15:00	Try: Paul Schoeman; Luke Watson; Jaco Grobler; Tim Whitehead; Ntabeni Dukisa; Shane Gates; Thembelani Bholi; Scott van Breda; Kevin Luiters; Con: Scott van Breda	Report	Try: Ruan Steenkamp; Sidney Tobias; Con: Kobus Marais; Joshua Stander; Pen: Kobus Marais	Referee: Rasta Rasivhenge

4 July 2014	Southern Kings	50–24	Sharks XV	Nelson Mandela Bay Stadium, Port Elizabeth
19:00	Try: Luke Watson; Shane Gates; Shaun McDonald; Thembelani Bholi; Tom Botha; Siyanda Grey; Con: Gary van Aswegen; Scott van Breda	Report	Try: Jongi Nokwe; Sizo Maseko; Quinton Crocker; Con: Fred Zeilinga; Jean-Luc du Plessis; Pen: Fred Zeilinga; Cards: Quinton Crocker (yellow card)

== Under-21 Provincial Championship ==
=== Log ===
2014 Under-21 Provincial Championship Group B log
Pos	Team	Pld	W	D	L	PF	PA	PD	TF	TA	TB	LB	Pts	Qualification
1	Eastern Province U21	7	7	0	0	261	90	+171	35	12	6	0	34	Semi-finals and promotion/relegation play-offs
2	Boland U21	7	6	0	1	305	162	+143	47	23	6	0	30	Qualified for the semi-finals
3	SWD U21	7	5	0	2	202	171	+31	27	22	3	0	23	Qualified for the semi-finals
4	Limpopo Blue Bulls U21	7	3	0	4	230	177	+53	37	24	5	3	20	Qualified for the semi-finals
5	Griquas U21	7	3	0	4	136	190	−54	18	28	2	2	16	
6	Falcons U21	7	3	0	4	173	212	−39	23	30	2	1	15	
7	Pumas U21	7	1	0	6	136	212	−76	21	31	2	1	7	
8	Griffons U21	7	0	0	7	133	362	−229	17	55	0	1	1	

Rules for classification: 4 points for a win, 2 points for a draw, 1 bonus point for a loss by seven points or less, 1 bonus point for scoring four or more tries in a match

=== Round-by-round ===
Team Progression – 2014 Under-21 Provincial Championship Group B
Team	R1	R2	R3	R4	R5	R6	R7	R8	Semi	Final	Promo
Opposition	FNH	GRF	BOL	LIM	PMA	SWD	GRQ	—N/a	LIM	SWD	BDR
Cumulative Points	5	10	14	19	24	29	34	34			
Position	1st	1st	1st	1st	1st	1st	1st	1st			
Key:	win	draw	loss	bye							

=== Fixtures and results ===
9 August 2014	Falcons U21	22–42	Eastern Province U21	Barnard Stadium, Kempton Park
15:00	Try: Marius Breytenbach 29'; Koos Bosman 39'; Andries Schutte 62'; Angus Cleophas 79'; Con: Kyle Hilton 30' (1/2); Wayne Gardner (0/2)	Report; Scoreboard	Try: Selvyn Davids 15', 19'; Sphu Msutwana 24'; Sergeal Petersen 32'; Aya Dlepu 35', 65'; Con: MC Venter 16', 33', 36' (3/6); Pen: MC Venter 3', 13' (2/2); Cards: Claude Tshidibi (yellow card) 49' to 59'	Referee: Daniel Fortuin

16 August 2014	Griffons U21	7–59	Eastern Province U21	North West Stadium, Welkom
14:30	Try: Bren Marais 70'; Con: Reynardt Muller 71' (1/1)	Report; Scoreboard	Try: Sergeal Petersen 5', 20'; Selvyn Davids 13', 65'; Ivan-John du Preez 22'; Mario Mowers 26'; Sphu Msutwana 43', 59'; Kevin Kaba 79'; Con: MC Venter 14', 23', 27', 44', 60', 66', 80' (7/9)	Attendance: 200; Referee: Oregopotse Rametsi

22 August 2014	Eastern Province U21	23–3	Boland U21	Central Grounds, Uitenhage
19:00	Try: Siphesihle Punguzwa 55'; Sergeal Petersen 75'; Claude Tshidibi 78'; Con: MC Venter 56' (1/2); Selvyn Davids (0/1); Pen: MC Venter 3', 45' (2/2); Cards: Ivan-John du Preez (yellow card) 65'	Report; Scoreboard	Pen: Anzo Stubbs (0/1); Ryno Conradie 34' (1/2); Cards: Erik Meyer (yellow card) 42' to 53'	Referee: Daniel Fortuin

30 August 2014	Eastern Province U21	36–21	Limpopo Blue Bulls U21	Nelson Mandela Bay Stadium, Port Elizabeth
16:30	Try: Sergeal Petersen 6'; Ivan-John du Preez 38'; Selvyn Davids 64', 69'; Sphu Msutwana 72'; Con: MC Venter 7', 39', 65', 73' (4/5); Pen: MC Venter 4' (1/1); Cards: MC Venter (yellow card) 20' to 30'	Scoreboard	Try: Jean Grobler 14'; Jovan Cookson 21'; Jean Volkwyn 28'; Con: Jean Grobler 15', 22', 29' (3/3); Pen: Jean Grobler (0/1); Cards: Juan van der Westhuizen (yellow card) 33' to 43'; Pieter Kruger (yellow card) 37' to 47'	Attendance: 500; Referee: Francois Pretorius

6 September 2014	Eastern Province U21	36–10	Pumas U21	SAPS Club Field, Port Elizabeth
15:00	Try: Frans Gerber 16'; Sonwabo Majola 34' penalty try 58'; Sinethemba Skelem 63'; Selvyn Davids 77'; Con: MC Venter 17', 35', 59' (3/3); Juan Smit 64' (1/2); Pen: MC Venter 52' (1/2); Cards: Brendan Hector (yellow card) 47' to 57'	Scoreboard	Try: Henry Badenhorst 10'; Wian van Schalkwyk 74'; Con: Ruben Carelse (0/2); Cards: Steven Jacobs (yellow card) 51' to 61'	Referee: Archie Sehlako

12 September 2014	SWD U21	6–37	Eastern Province U21	Outeniqua Park, George
17:00	Pen: Fizell Fredericks 10', 37' (2/3)	Scoreboard	Try: Nic Roebeck 23'; Frans Gerber 34'; Ivan-John du Preez 59'; Selvyn Davids 62'; Con: Selvyn Davids 24', 35', 60', 63' (4/4); Pen: Selvyn Davids 4', 14', 47' (3/3); Cards: Stephan Zaayman (yellow card) 64' to 74'; Warrick Venter (yellow card) 65' to 75'	Referee: Jaco Kotze

20 September 2014	Eastern Province U21	28–21	Griquas U21	Nelson Mandela Bay Stadium, Port Elizabeth
12:30	Try: Sonwabo Majola 5'; Khaya Malotana 43'; Vukile Sofisa 47'; Aidon Davis 52'; Con: Selvyn Davids 6', 44', 48', 53' (4/4); Cards: Stephan Zaayman (yellow card) 69'	Report; Scoreboard	Try: Stephan Malan 18'; Hillford Clarke 75'; Con: Christo Coetzee 19' (1/2); Pen: Christo Coetzee 4', 13', 39' (3/3)	Attendance: 500; Referee: Jaco Pretorius

Semi-Final	3 October 2014	Eastern Province U21	28–26	Limpopo Blue Bulls U21	Framesby High School, Port Elizabeth
	15:00	Try: Sergeal Petersen 4'; Riaan Esterhuizen 18'; Selvyn Davids 28'; Con: Selvyn Davids 5', 19' (2/3); Pen: Selvyn Davids 16', 34', 40' (3/3); Cards: CJ Velleman (yellow card) 67' to 77'	Scoreboard	Try: Oskar Calitz 11'; Jovan Cookson 31'; Corné Ras 70'; Wolta Mtsweni 74'; Con: Jean Grobler 12', 32', 75' (3/4); Cards: Stephanus Smith (yellow card) 39' to 49'	Attendance: 250; Referee: Eduan Nel

Final	17 October 2014	Eastern Province U21	46–3	SWD U21	North West Stadium, Welkom
	13:00	Try: Franswa Ueckermann 20'; Sphu Msutwana 23'; Selvyn Davids 48'; Sergeal Petersen 49'; CJ Velleman 52'; Aidon Davis 60'; Con: Selvyn Davids 21', 24', 48', 50', 60' (5/6); Pen: Selvyn Davids 26', 7' (2/2)	Report; Scoreboard	Pen: Leighton Eksteen 5' (1/2); Drop: Leighton Eksteen (0/1)	Attendance: 200; Referee: Archie Sehlako

Promotion play-off	24 October 2014	Border U21	9–64	Eastern Province U21	Buffalo City Stadium, East London
	18:00	Pen: Devandré Sissing 7', 30', 35' (3/5)	Scoreboard	Try: Aidon Davis 20'; Selvyn Davids 26'; CJ Velleman 33', 42'; Malcolm Jaer 37'; Sergeal Petersen 44', 47'; Stephan Zaayman 56'; Warren Swarts 75'; Jaco Bernardo 80'; Con: Selvyn Davids 21', 27', 34', 43', 45', 57', 76' (7/9); Sergeal Petersen (0/1); Cards: Aidon Davis (yellow card) 35' to 45'; Malcolm Jaer (yellow card) 54' to 64'	Attendance: 300; Referee: Francois Pretorius

=== Players ===
The Eastern Province Kings Under-21 squad for the 2014 Under-21 Provincial Championship:

Eastern Province U21 – 2014 Under-21 Provincial Championship

Forwards

- Aidon Davis
- Ivan-John du Preez
- Francois Gerber
- Brendan Hector
- Kevin Kaba
- Enoch Mnyaka
- Matthew Moore
- Tyler Paul
- Siphesihle Punguzwa
- Tyrone Rankin
- Nic Roebeck
- John-Henry Schmitt
- Vukile Sofisa
- Claude Tshidibi
- Elandré van der Merwe
- CJ Velleman
- Warrick Venter
- Stephan Zaayman
- Did not play:
- Armand du Preez
- Jonathan Ford
- Zaine Marx
- Erwin Slabbert
- Arrie van der Berg

Backs

- Jaco Bernardo
- Selvyn Davids
- Aya Dlepu
- Riaan Esterhuizen
- Malcolm Jaer
- Sonwabo Majola
- Khaya Malotana
- Mario Mowers
- Sergeal Petersen
- Juan Smit
- Warren Swarts
- Franswa Ueckermann
- MC Venter
- Did not play:
- Jason Baggott
- Dillon Beckett
- Ntsikelelo Mlamleli
- Sinethemba Skelem
- Sherwin Slater

Coach

- Ryan Felix

=== Player statistics ===
The following table shows players statistics for the 2014 Under-21 Provincial Championship season:

Player Statistics – 2014 Under-21 Provincial Championship
Player	Starts	Used Sub	Unused Sub	Points	Tries	Cons	Pens	DGs	YC	RC
Enoch Mnyaka	1	2	0	0	0	0	0	0	0	0
Matthew Moore	1	5	1	0	0	0	0	0	0	0
Nic Roebeck	8	1	0	5	1	0	0	0	0	0
Vukile Sofisa	8	1	0	5	1	0	0	0	0	0
Tyrone Rankin	1	4	1	0	0	0	0	0	0	0
John-Henry Schmitt	7	2	0	0	0	0	0	0	0	0
Warrick Venter	1	3	0	0	0	0	0	0	1	0
Brendan Hector	7	1	0	0	0	0	0	0	1	0
Kevin Kaba	9	0	0	5	1	0	0	0	0	0
Tyler Paul	0	1	0	0	0	0	0	0	1	0
Frans Gerber	2	5	1	10	2	0	0	0	0	0
Siphesihle Punguzwa	4	0	0	5	1	0	0	0	0	0
Claude Tshidibi	3	4	0	5	1	0	0	0	1	0
CJ Velleman	2	0	0	5	1	0	0	0	1	0
Elandré van der Merwe	0	1	0	0	0	0	0	0	0	0
Stephan Zaayman	6	1	0	0	0	0	0	0	1	0
Aidon Davis	3	0	0	10	2	0	0	0	0	0
Ivan-John du Preez	9	0	0	15	3	0	0	0	1	0
Erwin Slabbert	0	2	0	0	0	0	0	0	0	0
Mario Mowers	0	4	0	5	1	0	0	0	0	0
Sonwabo Majola	2	3	2	10	2	0	0	0	0	0
Franswa Ueckermann	7	0	0	5	1	0	0	0	0	0
Jason Baggott	0	0	1	0	0	0	0	0	1	0
Malcolm Jaer	2	0	0	0	0	0	0	0	1	0
Warren Swarts	2	5	0	0	0	0	0	0	0	0
MC Venter	5	1	0	54	0	18	6	0	1	0
Jaco Bernardo	2	4	1	0	0	0	0	0	0	0
Riaan Esterhuizen	8	0	0	5	1	0	0	0	0	0
Sphu Msutwana	9	0	0	25	5	0	0	0	0	0
Juan Smit	0	2	0	2	0	1	0	0	0	0
Aya Dlepu	8	0	0	10	2	0	0	0	0	0
Khaya Malotana	2	2	0	5	1	0	0	0	0	0
Sergeal Petersen	7	0	0	35	7	0	0	0	0	0
Sinethemba Skelem	0	2	0	5	1	0	0	0	0	0
Selvyn Davids	9	0	0	104	10	15	8	0	0	0

=== Player appearances ===
Player Appearances – 2014 Under-21 Provincial Championship
Player	FNH	GRF	BOL	LIM	PMA	SWD	GRQ	LIM	SWD	BDR
Vukile Sofisa	1	3	3	1	3	3	17 (substituted on)	3	3	3
John-Henry Schmitt	2	2	2	2	19 (substituted on)	2	16 (substituted on)	2	2	
Nic Roebeck	3	1	1	17 (substituted on)	1	1	1	1	1	1
Kevin Kaba	4	4	4	4	4	4	4	4	4	4
Brendan Hector	5	5	5	5	5	5	5		18 (substituted on)	18
Siphesihle Punguzwa	6	6	6	6						
Stephan Zaayman	7		7		18 (substituted on)	7	7	5	5	5
Ivan-John du Preez	8	8	8	8	8	8	6	8	8	
Franswa Ueckermann	9	9	9	9		9		9	9	9
MC Venter	10	10	10	10	10		22 (substituted on)			
Aya Dlepu	11	11	11	11		11	11	11	11	11
Riaan Esterhuizen	12	12	12	12	13	12		12	12	12
Sphu Msutwana	13	13	13	13	11	13	13	13	13	13
Sergeal Petersen	14	14	14	14		14		14	14	14
Selvyn Davids	15	15	15	15	15	15	15	15	15	15
Tyrone Rankin	16 (substituted on)	16 (substituted on)	16 (substituted on)	16 (substituted on)	2			16		16
Matthew Moore	17 (substituted on)	17 (substituted on)			17 (substituted on)	17 (substituted on)	3	17	17 (substituted on)	17
Claude Tshidibi	18 (substituted on)	7	18 (substituted on)	7	7	19 (substituted on)	19 (substituted on)			
Frans Gerber	19 (substituted on)	19 (substituted on)	19 (substituted on)	19	6	6		19 (substituted on)	19 (substituted on)	19
Mario Mowers	20 (substituted on)	20 (substituted on)			20 (substituted on)		20 (substituted on)			
Warren Swarts	21 (substituted on)	21 (substituted on)	21 (substituted on)	21 (substituted on)		10	10		21 (substituted on)	21
Khaya Malotana	22 (substituted on)	22 (substituted on)			14		14			
Enoch Mnyaka		18 (substituted on)	17 (substituted on)	3						
Sonwabo Majola			20 (substituted on)	20 (substituted on)	9	20	9	20	20 (substituted on)	
Jaco Bernardo			22 (substituted on)	22 (substituted on)	12	22	12	22 (substituted on)	22 (substituted on)	22
Elandré van der Merwe				18 (substituted on)						
Warrick Venter					16 (substituted on)	16 (substituted on)	2		16 (substituted on)	2
Juan Smit					21 (substituted on)	21 (substituted on)				
Sinethemba Skelem					22 (substituted on)		21 (substituted on)			
Erwin Slabbert						18 (substituted on)	18 (substituted on)			
Aidon Davis							8	7	7	8
CJ Velleman								6	6	6
Malcolm Jaer								10	10	10
Tyler Paul								18 (substituted on)		
Jason Baggott								21		20
Wynand Grassmann										7

== Under-19 Provincial Championship ==
=== Log ===
2014 Under-19 Provincial Championship Group A log
Pos	Team	Pld	W	D	L	PF	PA	PD	TF	TA	TB	LB	Pts	Qualification
1	Blue Bulls U19	12	9	0	3	387	282	+105	53	34	9	2	47	Semi-finals
2	Free State U19	12	8	0	4	310	204	+106	45	23	7	2	41	Semi-finals
3	Western Province U19	12	9	0	3	332	270	+62	38	36	5	0	41	Semi-finals
4	Sharks U19	12	6	0	6	287	256	+31	35	33	4	4	32	Semi-finals
5	Golden Lions U19	12	4	0	8	222	313	−91	28	44	3	3	22	
6	Eastern Province U19	12	4	0	8	227	253	−26	25	32	2	3	21	
7	Leopards U19	12	2	0	10	243	430	−187	38	60	5	2	15	Promotion/relegation play-offs

Rules for classification:
- 4 points for a win
- 2 points for a draw
- 1 bonus point for a loss by seven points or less
- 1 bonus point for scoring four or more tries in a match

=== Round-by-round ===
Team Progression – 2014 Under-19 Provincial Championship
Team	R1	R2	R3	R4	R5	R6	R7	R8	R9	R10	R11	R12	R13	R14
Opposition	BUL	LIO	FSC	LEO	WPR	LIO	FSC	—N/a	SHA	LEO	WPR	SHA	—N/a	BUL
Cumulative Points	0	1	1	6	6	10	14	14	14	19	20	21	21	21
Log Position	6th	6th	7th	7th	7th	5th	4th	5th	5th	5th	5th	5th	6th	6th
Key:	win	draw	loss	bye										

=== Fixtures and results ===
11 July 2014	Blue Bulls U19	29–17	Eastern Province U19	Loftus Versfeld, Pretoria
15:00	Try: Jurie Linde 3', 17'; Philip Orffer 5'; RG Snyman 61'; Con: Dewald Human 4', 5', 18' (3/4); Pen: Dewald Human 12' (1/1)	Scoreboard	Try: Tyler Paul 19'; CJ Velleman 51'; Con: Jason Vers 20' (1/1); Kewan Gibb 52' (1/1); Pen: Jason Vers 25' (1/1); Cards: Jason Baggott (yellow card) 40' to 51'; Luan Nieuwoudt (yellow card) 60' to 69'	Referee: Oregopotse Rametsi

18 July 2014	Eastern Province U19	13–16	Golden Lions U19	NMMU Stadium, Port Elizabeth
17:00	Try: Malcolm Jaer 42'; CJ Velleman 55'; Con: Jason Vers (0/1); Malcolm Jaer (0/1); Pen: Jason Vers 3' (1/2); Cards: Tyler Paul (yellow card) 7' to 17'	Scoreboard	Try: Clinton Theron 63'; Con: Shaun Reynolds 63' (1/1); Pen: Xander Cronjé 8' (1/1); Shaun Reynolds 29', 36' (2/2)	Attendance: 290; Referee: Lusanda Jam

26 July 2014	Free State U19	26–9	Eastern Province U19	Shimla Park, Bloemfontein
12:00	Try: Junior Burger 34', 55'; Stephen Rautenbach 60'; TJ Goddard 65'; Con: André Swarts 35' (1/1); Sechaba Matsoele 56' (1/1); Gerrie Labuschagné 66' (1/2); Pen: André Swarts (0/1); Cards: Jasper Wiese (yellow card) 19'	Scoreboard	Pen: Jason Vers 21', 28' (2/2); Malcolm Jaer 54' (1/2)	Attendance: 100; Referee: Archie Sehlako

2 August 2014	Leopards U19	26–32	Eastern Province U19	Olën Park, Potchefstroom
11:00	Try: Allen Muller 12'; Elden Schoeman 43', 55'; Brendon Kahts 66'; Con: Brendon Kahts 13', 44', 67' (3/4); Cards: Jacques van Zyl (yellow card) 27' to 38'	Scoreboard	Try: CJ Velleman 16'; Malcolm Jaer 33', 69'; Wynand Grassmann 64'; Con: Malcolm Jaer 17', 34', 65' (3/4); Pen: Malcolm Jaer 24', 29' (2/2); Cards: Tembelihle Yase (yellow card) 27' to 38'	Attendance: 100

8 August 2014	Eastern Province U19	10–38	Western Province U19	Nelson Mandela Bay Stadium, Port Elizabeth
16:30	Try: CJ Velleman 59'; Con: Malcolm Jaer 60' (1/1); Pen: Malcolm Jaer 6' (1/2); Cameron Hertz (0/1)	Scoreboard	Try: Heinrich Buhr 34'; Charlton Jonas 54'; Rikus Bothma 63'; Dewald Naudé 70'; Con: Ernst Stapelberg 35', 55' (2/2); Brandon Thomson 71' (1/2); Pen: Ernst Stapelberg 2', 20', 26', 38' (4/5)

16 August 2014	Golden Lions U19	7–18	Eastern Province U19	Ellis Park Stadium, Johannesburg
10:30	Try: Derik Bezuidenhout 7'; Con: Kobus Engelbrecht 8' (1/1)	Scoreboard	Try: CJ Velleman 34'; Lindelwe Zungu 68'; Con: Malcolm Jaer 69' (1/2); Pen: Malcolm Jaer 9', 48' (2/3)	Attendance: 500; Referee: Archie Sehlako

22 August 2014	Eastern Province U19	17–13	Free State U19	Central Grounds, Uitenhage
17:00	Try: Jeremy Ward 25'; Luan Nieuwoudt 40'; Con: Malcolm Jaer 26', 41' (2/2); Pen: Malcolm Jaer 69' (1/1)	Scoreboard	Try: Ox Nché 34'; TJ Goddard 60'; Con: André Swarts (0/2); Pen: André Swarts 2' (1/1)	Attendance: 400; Referee: Oregopotse Rametsi

5 September 2014	Eastern Province U19	7–15	Sharks U19	NMMU Stadium, Port Elizabeth
17:00	Try: Jeremy Ward 64'; Con: Garrick Mattheus 65' (1/1); Pen: Malcolm Jaer (0/2); Garrick Mattheus (0/1); Cards: David Murray (yellow card) 34' to 47'	Scoreboard	Try: Marcel Coetzee 26'; Dan du Preez 51'; Con: Joshua Bragman 27' (1/2); Pen: Joshua Bragman 57' (1/1); Cards: Wian Vosloo (yellow card) 68'	Referee: Ricus van der Hoven

12 September 2014	Eastern Province U19	42–7	Leopards U19	Nelson Mandela Bay Stadium, Port Elizabeth
16:30	Try: Malcolm Jaer 7', 53'; Lindelwe Zungu 11'; CJ Velleman 40'; JP Jamieson 66'; Con: Malcolm Jaer 12', 41', 67' (3/4); Garrick Mattheus 54' (1/1); Pen: Malcolm Jaer 20', 34', 52' (3/4); Cards: Jeremy Ward (yellow card) 10' to 21'; David Murray (yellow card) 43' to 54'; Tyler Paul (yellow card) 58' to 68'	Scoreboard	Try: Gideon van der Merwe 5'; Con: Stefan Coetzer 6' (1/1); Pen: Stefan Coetzer (0/1); Cards: Jacques van Zyl (yellow card) 51' to 61'; Lourens Jacobus Abraham Basson (yellow card) 58' to 68'	Referee: Vusi Msibi

20 September 2014	Western Province U19	21–20	Eastern Province U19	City Park Stadium, Athlone
10:45	Try: David Ribbans 46'; Justin Phillips 65'; Con: Ernst Stapelberg 47' (1/2); Pen: Ernst Stapelberg 9', 50', 69' (3/3); Cards: Grant Hermanus (yellow card) 68'	Report; Scoreboard	Try: Malcolm Jaer 30'; Arno Lotter 61'; Con: Kewan Gibb 31' (1/1); Jason Baggott 62' (1/1); Pen: Malcolm Jaer 2', 68' (2/6); Drop: Jason Baggott (0/1)	Referee: Renier Vermeulen

27 September 2014	Sharks U19	24–21	Eastern Province U19	Kings Park Stadium, Durban
09:30	Try: Jean-Luc du Preez 11'; Sphamandla Ngcobo 43'; Inny Radebe 58'; Con: Inny Radebe 12', 44', 59' (3/3); Pen: Inny Radebe 68' (1/2); Cards: Marius Louw (yellow card) 17'	Report; Scoreboard	Try: Tyler Paul 54'; Lindelwe Zungu 60'; Con: Malcolm Jaer 55' (1/2); Pen: Garrick Mattheus 2' (1/3); Malcolm Jaer 36', 67' (2/2)	Attendance: 100; Referee: Gerrie de Bruin

10 October 2014	Eastern Province U19	21–31	Blue Bulls U19	Nelson Mandela Bay Stadium, Port Elizabeth
16:30	Try: Malcolm Jaer 54', 30'; Con: Garrick Mattheus 31' (1/2); Pen: Garrick Mattheus 11', 20', 27' (3/3); Cards: Elandré van der Merwe (yellow card) 42'	Report; Scoreboard	Try: Jurie Linde 62', 28', 51'; Abongile Nonkontwana 23'; Con: Simon Bolze 52', 24', 29' (3/3); Kurt Webster 63' (1/1); Pen: Simon Bolze 33' (1/1)	Attendance: 150; Referee: Tahla Ntshakaza

=== Players ===
The Eastern Province Kings Under-19 squad for the 2014 Under-19 Provincial Championship:

Eastern Province U19 – 2014 Under-19 Provincial Championship Forwards

- Ronnie Beyl
- Dyllon Domoney
- Wynand Grassmann
- Matthew Howes
- Gerrit Huisamen
- Mathew Jackson
- JP Jamieson
- Arno Lotter
- Sintu Manjezi
- David Murray
- Qhama Mvimbi
- Mihlali Nchukana
- Tyler Paul
- Jayson Reinecke
- Elandré van der Merwe
- CJ Velleman
- Chris Whitting
- Thembelihle Yase
- Did not play:
- Justin Hollis

Backs

- Julio Abels
- Jason Baggott
- Luca Dalla-Vecchia
- Kewan Gibb
- James Hall
- Cameron Hertz
- Malcolm Jaer
- Martin Keller
- Garrick Mattheus
- Athi Mayinje
- Thabani Mgugudo
- Vinciënt Moss
- Luan Nieuwoudt
- Yamkela Nyalambisa
- Dylan Pietersen
- Dominik Uytenbogaardt
- Jason Vers
- Jeremy Ward
- Lindelwe Zungu
- Did not play:
- Luciano Daniels
- Luzuko Mase
- Dylan Vermaak

Coach

- Mzwandile Stick

=== Player statistics ===
The following table shows players statistics for the 2014 Under-19 Provincial Championship season:

Player Statistics – 2014 Under-19 Provincial Championship
Player	Starts	Used Sub	Unused Sub	Points	Tries	Cons	Pens	DGs	YC	RC
Ronnie Beyl	7	4	0	0	0	0	0	0	0	0
Matthew Howes	0	1	0	0	0	0	0	0	0	0
Mathew Jackson	0	4	0	0	0	0	0	0	0	0
David Murray	9	1	0	0	0	0	0	0	2	0
Chris Whitting	2	2	3	0	0	0	0	0	0	0
Thembelihle Yase	4	7	0	0	0	0	0	0	1	0
Dyllon Domoney	1	4	0	0	0	0	0	0	0	0
JP Jamieson	8	2	0	5	1	0	0	0	0	0
Arno Lotter	0	4	1	5	1	0	0	0	0	0
Jason Reynecke	2	1	0	0	0	0	0	0	0	0
Wynand Grassmann	11	0	0	5	1	0	0	0	0	0
Gerrit Huisamen	5	6	0	0	0	0	0	0	0	0
Sintu Manjezi	11	0	0	0	0	0	0	0	0	0
Tyler Paul	11	0	0	10	2	0	0	0	2	0
CJ Velleman	11	0	0	30	6	0	0	0	0	0
Qhama Mvimbi	0	4	0	0	0	0	0	0	0	0
Mihlali Nchukana	2	5	3	0	0	0	0	0	0	0
Elandré van der Merwe	4	4	2	0	0	0	0	0	0	0
Jason Baggott	11	0	0	2	0	1	0	0	1	0
Luciano Daniels	0	0	1	0	0	0	0	0	0	0
Kewan Gibb	4	4	1	4	0	2	0	0	0	0
Julio Abels	3	2	1	0	0	0	0	0	0	0
James Hall	0	1	0	0	0	0	0	0	0	0
Jason Vers	2	2	2	14	0	1	4	0	0	0
Vinciënt Moss	3	4	1	0	0	0	0	0	0	0
Luan Nieuwoudt	9	0	0	5	1	0	0	0	1	0
Dylan Pietersen	1	0	0	0	0	0	0	0	0	0
Dominik Uytenbogaardt	2	0	0	0	0	0	0	0	0	0
Jeremy Ward	5	0	0	10	2	0	0	0	1	0
Luca Dalla-Vecchia	4	0	0	0	0	0	0	0	0	0
Martin Keller	4	1	0	0	0	0	0	0	0	0
Thabani Mgugudo	2	2	0	0	0	0	0	0	0	0
Yamkela Nyalambisa	1	0	0	0	0	0	0	0	0	0
Athi Mayinje	0	4	1	0	0	0	0	0	0	0
Lindelwe Zungu	11	0	0	15	3	0	0	0	0	0
Cameron Hertz	1	1	0	0	0	0	0	0	0	0
Malcolm Jaer	11	0	0	94	6	11	14	0	0	0
Luzuko Mase	0	0	1	0	0	0	0	0	0	0
Garrick Mattheus	3	1	0	7	0	2	1	0	0	0

=== Player appearances ===
Player Appearances – 2014 Under-19 Provincial Championship
Player	BUL	LIO	FSC	LEO	WPR	LIO	FSC	SHA	LEO	WPR	SHA	BUL
Thembelihle Yase	1	18 (substituted on)	18 (substituted on)	3	3	18 (substituted on)	1	18 (substituted on)	18 (substituted on)	18 (substituted on)	18 (substituted on)	16 (substituted on)
JP Jamieson	2	2	2		16 (substituted on)	2	2	2	16 (substituted on)	2	2	2
Chris Whitting	3	3					17	17 (substituted on)	17 (substituted on)	17	17	17
Wynand Grassmann	4	4	4	8	8	8	8	8	8	8	8	8
Sintu Manjezi	5	5	5	5	5	5	5	5	5	5	5	5
CJ Velleman	6	6	6	6	6	6	6	6	6	6	6	
Tyler Paul	7	7	7	7	7	7	7	7	4	4	7	7
Mihlali Nchukana	8	8		22 (substituted on)	23 (substituted on)	20	20	20 (substituted on)	20 (substituted on)	20	20 (substituted on)	20 (substituted on)
Jason Baggott	9	9	10	9	9	10	10	9	9	10	9	9
Jason Vers	10	10	21 (substituted on)	23	21 (substituted on)	21						
Lindelwe Zungu	11	11	11	15	13	11	11	11	11	11	11	11
Luan Nieuwoudt	12	12	12			13	12	12	12	12	12	12
Dominik Uytenbogaardt	13	13										
Thabani Mgugudo	14	23 (substituted on)	22 (substituted on)	13								
Malcolm Jaer	15	15	15	10	10	15	15	15	15	15	15	15
Arno Lotter	16 (substituted on)	16	16 (substituted on)	16 (substituted on)						16 (substituted on)		
Ronnie Beyl	17 (substituted on)	17 (substituted on)	3	18 (substituted on)	18 (substituted on)	3	3	3	3	3	3	3
David Murray	18 (substituted on)	1	1	1	1	1		1	1	1	1	1
Gerrit Huisamen	19 (substituted on)	19 (substituted on)	19 (substituted on)	4	4	4	4	19 (substituted on)	19 (substituted on)	19 (substituted on)	4	18 (substituted on)
Qhama Mvimbi	20 (substituted on)	20 (substituted on)		20 (substituted on)	20 (substituted on)							
Kewan Gibb	21 (substituted on)	22 (substituted on)	9		22 (substituted on)	9	9	21	21 (substituted on)	9		21 (substituted on)
Luzuko Mase	22											
Julio Abels	23 (substituted on)	14	23 (substituted on)	11	11	23						
Elandré van der Merwe		21 (substituted on)	8	19	19 (substituted on)	19	19 (substituted on)	4	7	7	19 (substituted on)	4
Dylan Peterson			13									
Yamkela Nyalambisa			14									
Mathew Jackson			17 (substituted on)	17 (substituted on)	17 (substituted on)	17 (substituted on)						
Jayson Reinecke			20 (substituted on)	2	2							6
Vinciënt Moss				12	12	12	22 (substituted on)	22 (substituted on)	22 (substituted on)	22 (substituted on)	22	22 (substituted on)
Martin Keller				14	14	14	14			21 (substituted on)		23 (substituted on)
Luciano Daniels				21								
Cameron Hertz					15	22 (substituted on)						
Dyllon Domoney						16 (substituted on)	16 (substituted on)	16 (substituted on)	2		16 (substituted on)	
Jeremy Ward							13	13	13	13	13	13
Matthew Howes							18 (substituted on)					
Garrick Mattheus							21 (substituted on)	10	10		10	10
Athi Mayinje							23 (substituted on)	23 (substituted on)	23 (substituted on)	23 (substituted on)	23	14
Luca Dalla-Vecchia								14	14	14	14	
James Hall											21 (substituted on)	
Justin Hollis												19 (substituted on)

== Youth weeks ==
The Eastern Province Rugby Union announced their squads for the 2014 Under-18 Craven Week, the 2014 Under-18 Academy Week and the 2014 Under-16 Grant Khomo Week tournaments on 21 May 2014:

=== Under-18 Craven Week ===
The 2014 Under-18 Craven Week competition was held between 14 and 19 July 2014 in Middelburg. Eastern Province Rugby Union entered two sides – Eastern Province U18 and Eastern Province Country Districts U18. Eastern Province U18 became unofficial champions for the first time in 37 years as they won all three their matches and beat the SWD U18 team in the final match of the tournament.

Eastern Province U18 – Craven Week
Forwards	Wihan Coetzer • Erich de Jager • Stefan Janse van Vuuren • Lupumlo Mguca • Morney Moos • SF Nieuwoudt • Junior Pokomela • Kaden Prince • Robin Stevens • Johann van Niekerk • Alandré van Rooyen • Roché van Zyl
Backs	Nathan Augustus • Heino Bezuidenhout • Curwin Bosch • Darren Lottering • Athi Mayinje • Rouche Nel • Lunathi Nxele • Tiaan Stander • Keanu Vers • Jeremy Ward
Coach	Louis Gerber

15 July 2014	Blue Bulls U18	25–26	Eastern Province U18	HTS Middelburg, Middelburg
14:10	Try: Ettiene Matthys 30'; Con: Tinus de Beer 31' (1/1); Pen: Tinus de Beer 5', 25', 33', 39', 63', 65' (6/6)	Scoreboard	Try: Curwin Bosch 51'; Athi Mayinje 70'; Con: Curwin Bosch 52', 70' (2/2); Pen: Curwin Bosch 3', 16', 40', 59' (4/5)	Referee: Jaco Pretorius

17 July 2014	Eastern Province U18	19–5	Rut Free State U18	HTS Middelburg, Middelburg
15:30	Try: Keanu Vers 13'; Athi Mayinje 23'; Darren Lottering 30'; Con: Curwin Bosch 13', 23' (2/3); Pen: Curwin Bosch (0/2)	Scoreboard	Try: Julian Jordaan 63'; Con: Jeandré Christian (0/1); Pen: Lourens Steenkamp (0/1)	Referee: Rodney Boneparte

19 July 2014	SWD U18	7–25	Eastern Province U18	HTS Middelburg, Middelburg
12:45	Try: Domenic Donevan Smit 66'; Con: JT Jackson 66' (1/1); Cards: Adré Smith (yellow card) 16'	Scoreboard	Try: Athi Mayinje 19'; Johann van Niekerk 28'; SF Nieuwoudt 37'; Con: Curwin Bosch 20', 29' (2/3); Pen: Curwin Bosch 22', 35' (2/4)

Eastern Province Country Districts U18 – Craven Week
Forwards	JP Barkhuizen • Ryan Calitz • Phillip Crouse • Erwin Ittershagen-Strauss • Arno le Roux • Chuma Mboxwana • NJ Oosthuizen • Evert Potgieter • Ethan September • MC van Damme • Luigy van Jaarsveld • Hannes Viljoen • Xandré Vos
Backs	Ansah Ansah • Davron Cameron • Bradley Christian • Cameron Hertz • Fabio Mapaling • Joshua Shelly • Josiah Twum-Boafo • Craig Williams • Tiaan van Solms
Coach	Alan Miles

14 July 2014	Eastern Province Country Districts U18	54–43	Zimbabwe U18	HTS Middelburg, Middelburg
10:40	Try: Ethan September 6'; Craig Williams 17'; Joshua Shelly 19'; Xandré Vos 23'; Bradley Christian 28', 43'; NJ Oosthuizen 50'; Con: Cameron Hertz 7', 20', 24', 29', 44' (5/7); Pen: Cameron Hertz 2', 10', 39' (3/3); Cards: Hannes Viljoen (yellow card) 64'	Scoreboard	Try: Brian Mhuriyengwe 32'; Tawanda Gabriel Rukudzo Ngosi 34', 66'; Tinashe Martin Gonese 41'; Matthew Ushewokunze 60'; Matthew Ushewokunze 64'; Con: Campbell Nyakudya 33', 35', 42', 60', 64' (5/6); Pen: Campbell Nyakudya 9' (1/2)	Referee: Oregopotse Rametsi

16 July 2014	Griffons U18	33–15	Eastern Province Country Districts U18	HTS Middelburg, Middelburg
12:50	Try: Siya Ngxesha 23', 29'; Francois Stemmet 34'; Johann Vermaak 49', 69'; Con: Johan van Zyl 24', 30', 50' (3/4); Stephanus Johannes Vermaak 70' (1/1); Pen: Johan van Zyl (0/1)	Scoreboard	Try: Bradley Christian 45'; Davron Cameron 65'; Con: Cameron Hertz 46' (1/2); Pen: Cameron Hertz 2' (1/1); Cards: Cameron Hertz (yellow card) 26' to 36'	Referee: Cwengile Jadezweni

19 July 2014	Eastern Province Country Districts U18	13–35	Falcons U18	HTS Middelburg, Middelburg
11:10	Try: Josiah Twum-Boafo 4'; Arno le Roux 69'; Con: Cameron Hertz (0/2); Pen: Cameron Hertz 21' (1/2)	Scoreboard	Try: Forrest Roos 7'; Martin van Wyk 9', 38', 48'; Ntshepe Kokong 50'; Con: Forrest Roos 8', 10', 39', 48', 51' (5/5); Pen: Forrest Roos (0/1)

=== Under-18 Academy Week ===
The 2014 Under-18 Academy Week competition was held between 7 and 10 July 2014 in Worcester. Eastern Province Rugby Union entered two sides – Eastern Province U18 and Eastern Province Country Districts U18.

Eastern Province U18 – Academy Week
Forwards	Michael de Marco • Kamva Dilima • Duan du Plessis • Luthando Fini • André Lategan • Siwe Masoziwe • Xolisa Matshoba • Mihlali Mosi • Dean van der Westhuizen
Backs	Duwayne Baartman • Mohammed Connely • Luciano Grootboom • Yomalela Keswa • Denver Kleu • Tiaan Lourens • Malan Marais • Garrick Mattheus • Nkosi Ntebe
Reserves	Darren Domingo • Matthew Howes • Pierre Janeke • Joshua Mudrovcic
Coach	Jaco Jansen van Rensburg

7 July 2014	Pumas U18	31–49	Eastern Province U18	HTS Drostdy, Worcester
11:15	Try: Lukhanyiso Makaula 13'; Fana Ngwenya 25', 53'; Philani Nkosi 69'; Con: Wessel Muller 13', 26', 54', 69' (4/4); Pen: Wessel Muller 2' (1/2)	Scoreboard	Try: Dean van der Westhuizen 15', 50'; Luciano Grootboom 30'; Duan du Plessis 38'; Duwayne Baartman 60'; Denver Kleu 67'; Con: Garrick Mattheus 16', 31', 39', 61', 68' (5/6); Pen: Garrick Mattheus 8', 33', 35' (3/3)

8 July 2014	Eastern Province U18	12–61	KwaZulu-Natal U18	HTS Drostdy, Worcester
17:00	Try: Yomalela Keswa 30'; Michael de Marco 67'; Con: Nkosi Ntebe 31' (1/1); Denver Kleu (0/1); Drop: Luciano Grootboom (0/1)	Scoreboard	Try: Bader Pretorius 6', 50'; Jaydon Ashley Morgan 17'; Simiso Lindo Simphiwe Buthelezi 19'; Marco Palvie 22'; Teigan Erasmus 25', 52'; Masikane Mazwi 40'; Donovan Robert du Randt 61'; Con: Bader Pretorius 6', 18', 20', 52' (4/8); Simiso Lindo Simphiwe Buthelezi 62' (1/1); Pen: Bader Pretorius 3', 33' (2/2)

10 July 2014	Blue Bulls U18	7–7	Eastern Province U18	HTS Drostdy, Worcester
09:25	Try: Carlo de Nysschen 67'; Con: Hendrik Andries Mulder 67' (1/1)	Scoreboard	Try: Yomelela Keswa 22'; Con: Garrick Mattheus 23' (1/1); Pen: Garrick Mattheus (0/2)

Eastern Province Country Districts U18 – Academy Week
Forwards	Alan Cumming • Jan Antonie de Beer • Rayno Kruger • Dirk Johannes Louw • Zenande Mpalisa • Tshepiso Lifa Thabaneng • Johan Andreas van Niekerk • Sinekhaya Bulelani Gladman Vulindlu
Backs	Gevanhier Mitchum Blom • Glen Flitoor • Jaden Lourens • Warwick Meaker • Sinethemba Anothando Mkaza • Athenkosi Nkothani • Siya Siaw
Reserves	Brendan Engelbrecht • Martin Gordon Ferreira • Francois du Plessis Jordaan • Christiaan Philippus Nel • Francois Roodt • Khazimla Tiya • Alkeanan Kurt van Ster
Coach	Niel Schroeder

7 July 2014	Eastern Province Country Districts U18	37–0	Leopards U18	HTS Drostdy, Worcester
11:15	Try: Glen Flitoor 13', 20', 43'; Siya Siaw 51', 68'; Con: Christiaan Philippus Nel 14', 21', 44' (3/5); Pen: Christiaan Philippus Nel 28', 37' (2/2)	Scoreboard

8 July 2014	Red Valke U18	7–19	Eastern Province Country Districts U18	HTS Drostdy, Worcester
15:35	Try: Marnus Gruber 38'; Con: Marnus Gruber 39' (1/1); Pen: Marnus Gruber (0/1)	Scoreboard	Try: Christiaan Philippus Nel 45'; Sinekhaya Bulelani Gladman Vulindlu 49'; Glen Flitoor 67'; Con: Christiaan Philippus Nel 49', 68' (2/3)

10 July 2014	SWD U18	44–26	Eastern Province Country Districts U18	HTS Drostdy, Worcester
10:50	Try: Chrisjan Gabriel du Toit 4'; Cian Wagenaar 7'; Logan Victor Stoffels 11'; Taswin da Silva 36'; Riaan Kleyn 48'; Craig Duran Booysen 55'; Lohan Potgieter 60'; Con: Maurice White 4', 48', 61' (3/7); Pen: Maurice White 26' (1/1); Cards: Chrisjan Gabriel du Toit (yellow card) 65'	Scoreboard	Try: Glen Flitoor 1', 23', 44'; Brendan Engelbrecht 69'; Con: Gevanhier Mitchum Blom 2' (1/1); Christiaan Philippus Nel 23', 44' (2/2); Warwick Meaker (0/1)

=== Under-16 Grant Khomo Week ===
The 2014 Under-16 Grant Khomo Week competition was held between 7 and 10 July 2014 in Pretoria.

Eastern Province U16 – Grant Khomo Week
Forwards	William Duckit • Tertius Groenewald • Pieter Gunter • Shane Kluyts • Ollie Losaba • Thembinkosi Mangwana • Ewan Pieters • Connor Thalrose
Backs	Ethan Jantjies • Dobela Lubabalo • Sibabalwe Mzanywa • Sihle Njezula • Malan Olivier • Henco Pieterse • Lance Smith
Reserves	Herman Geissler • Athenkosi Halom • Vaughen Isaacs • Bendré Jonck • Ruben le Roux • Sazi Sandi • Rikus van As
Coach	Derik Olivier

7 July 2014	Eastern Province U16	12–48	Free State U16	TUT Stadium, Pretoria
12:30	Try: Sihle Njezula 5'; Sazi Sandi 46'; Con: Vaughen Isaacs 47' (1/2); Cards: Sihle Njezula (yellow card) 13'	Scoreboard	Try: Kyle Kermis 22'; Thian du Randt 32'; Lucky Makhamba 35'; Gerrie Koegelenberg 36', 56'; Mfez Moyo 40'; Mario Vieira 51'; Con: Mario Vieira 23', 35', 37', 52', 57' (5/7); Pen: Mario Vieira 8' (1/3)

8 July 2014	Pumas U16	26–28	Eastern Province U16	TUT Stadium, Pretoria
10:30	Try: Waldo Conradie 17'; JC Pretorius 34'; Ryno Pieterse 38'; Du Preez van der Merwe 60'; Con: Du Preez van der Merwe 35', 39' (2/3); Cards: Vusi Mkhonza (yellow card) 41'	Scoreboard	Try: Sihle Njezula 21'; Sibabalwe Mzanywa 26', 37', 47'; Con: Malan Olivier 22', 27', 38', 48' (4/4)

10 July 2014	Boland U16	10–24	Eastern Province U16	TUT Stadium, Pretoria
08:00	Try: Rick Jordaan 18'; Con: Keenan Williams 19' (1/1); Pen: Keenan Williams 13' (1/1)	Scoreboard	Try: Lance Smith 39'; Sibabalwe Mzanywa 45'; Pieter Gunter 54'; Con: Malan Olivier 40', 46', 55' (3/3); Pen: Malan Olivier 58' (1/2)

=== Under-13 Craven Week ===
The 2014 Under-13 Craven Week competition was held between 30 June and 4 July 2014 in Durban.

Eastern Province U13 – Craven Week
Forwards	Litha Adam • Yolisa Dladla • Terence Goliath • Jared Landman • Tiaan Moore • Zukisa Sali • Dominic Shone • Miguel Zenha
Backs	Enrico Bantom • Ayabulela Bulembo • Matthew Easton • Cameron le Vack • Arno Marx • Michael Paddock • Lithe-Tha Pule
Replacements	Ruan du Toit • Neil Francis • Siyamthanda Hallom • Aqhamile Limba • Aviwe Makoki • Tlhalefo Moleko • Octavian Muller

30 June 2014	Eastern Province U13	17–12	Limpopo Blue Bulls U13	Glenwood High School, Durban
10:30	Try: Yolisa Dladla 29'; Michael Paddock 38'; Con: Michael Paddock 30', 39' (2/2); Pen: Michael Paddock 50' (1/2)	Scoreboard	Try: Siphiwe Tjale 12'; Roy Stewart 33'; Con: Lucian Simpson 13' (1/2)

1 July 2014	Eastern Province U13	22–7	Golden Lions U13	Glenwood High School, Durban
12:30	Try: Enrico Bantom 29'; Michael Paddock 40'; Siyamthanda Hallom 50'; Con: Michael Paddock 30', 50' (2/3); Pen: Michael Paddock 20' (1/2)	Scoreboard	Try: Franku Muller 48'; Con: Ian Small-Smith 49' (1/1); Pen: Ian Small-Smith (0/1)

3 July 2014	Eastern Province U13	13–24	Border U13	Glenwood High School, Durban
15:30	Try: Siyamthanda Hallom 12'; Ayabulela Bulembo 18'; Con: Matthew Easton (0/2); Pen: Matthew Easton 8' (1/1)	Scoreboard	Try: Mntungwa Mapantsula 34'; Olilitha Maya 40'; Siposiso Javu 42'; Lawuka Bata 46'; Con: Rayden Masters 34', 47' (2/2); Siposiso Javu (0/2)

4 July 2014	Leopards U13	13–14	Eastern Province U13	Kings Park Stadium, Durban
12:30	Try: Gideon van Wyk 35'; Rossouw Karsten 46'; Con: Estiaan Schonfeldt (0/2); Pen: Estiaan Schonfeldt 17' (1/1)	Scoreboard	Try: Ayabulela Bulembo 10'; Michael Paddock 32'; Con: Michael Paddock 11', 33' (2/2)

== See also ==
- Eastern Province Elephants
- Southern Kings
- 2014 Vodacom Cup
- 2014 Currie Cup Premier Division
- 2014 Under-21 Provincial Championship
- 2014 Under-19 Provincial Championship
