= Fourie =

Fourie is a South African surname originating from Huguenot settlers. Notable people with the surname include:

== Artists ==
- Abrie Fourie (born 1969), South Africa-born photographer and digital media artist in Germany
- Charles J. Fourie (born 1965), actor, playwright, and director
- Dean Fourie (born 1969), actor
- Jo Fourie (Johanna Everharda La Rivière Fourie, 1884–1973), Netherlands-born South African musician and ethnomusicologist
- Johnny Fourie (Jan Carel Fourie, 1937–2007), jazz guitarist

== Athletes ==
- Arnu Fourie (born 1985), Paralympian gold medalist
- Jaco Fourie (born 1975), equestrian athlete
- Johan Fourie (born 1959), middle-distance runner
- John Fourie (born 1939), golfer
- Marione Fourie (born 2002), high hurdles athlete
- Pierre Fourie (1943–80), boxer
- Tegan Fourie (born 1998), field hockey player

=== Cricketers ===
- Brenden Fourie (born 1970)
- Jacques Fourie (born 1996), Namibian
- Johan Fourie (born 1982)
- Mathew Fourie (born 2002)
- Thinus Fourie (born 1979), South Africa-born Irish cricketer
- Yolani Fourie (born 1989)

=== Rugby union players ===
- Carel Fourie (Tossie, 1950–97), international player
- Corné Fourie (born 1988), club player in South Africa, Japan, England
- Deon Fourie (Deon André Fourie, born 1986)
- Hendre Fourie (born 1979), South Africa-born English player
- Jaco Fourie (born 1988)
- Jaque Fourie (born 1983)
- Lofty Fourie (1936–2001), international player
- Louis Fourie (Louis Johannes Fourie, born 1991)
- Polla Fourie (Theodorus Theunis Fourie, born 1945), international player
- Theo Fourie (born 2000), South Africa-born Australian player
- Tiaan Fourie (born 2002)
- Tim Fourie (born 1968), rugby league and union player in South Africa and England
- Werner Fourie (born 1998)

== Other ==
- Jopie Fourie (Josef Johannes Fourie, 1879–1914), Boer War soldier and rebel

== Politicians ==
- Adriaan Paulus Johannes Fourie (1882–1941), politician
- André Fourie (Andrew Fourie, born 1944), cabinet minister
- Bernardus Gerhardus Fourie (Brand Fourie, 1916–2008), diplomat
- Deon Fourie (Deon François Schönland Fourie (1932–2025), general, academic, military historian, heraldist
- Melanie Verwoerd (Melanie Van Niekerk, Melanie Fourie, born 1967), MP, ambassador, political analyst
- Willie Fourie (Willem Lodewikus Fourie), MP

=== Combat generals, Boer war ===
- Christiaan Ernst Fourie (1858–1943)
- Joachim Christoffel Fourie (1845–1900)
- Piet Fourie (Petrus Johannes Fourie, 1842–1916)

== See also ==
- Fanie Fourie's Lobola, 2007 novel and 2013 romantic comedy film
- Fourie du Preez (born 1982), international and Japanese club rugby union player
- Layla Fourie, 2013 thriller film
- Minister of Home Affairs v Fourie, a law case which led to the legalisation of same-sex marriage in South Africa
