= Fourier (surname) =

Fourier is a surname. Notable people with the surname include:

- Charles Fourier (1772–1837), French utopian socialist thinker
- Joseph Fourier (1768–1830), French mathematician and physicist
- Peter Fourier (1565–1640), French saint in the Roman Catholic Church and priest of Mattaincourt

== See also ==
- Fourier (disambiguation)
- Fourie
- Fourrier
