= Fourier =

Fourier may refer to:

- Fourier (surname), French surname

== Mathematics ==
- Fourier series, a weighted sum of sinusoids having a common period, the result of Fourier analysis of a periodic function
- Fourier analysis, the description of functions as sums of sinusoids
- Fourier transform, the type of linear canonical transform that is the generalization of the Fourier series
- Fourier operator, the kernel of the Fredholm integral of the first kind that defines the continuous Fourier transform
- Fourier inversion theorem, any one of several theorems by which Fourier inversion recovers a function from its Fourier transform
- Short-time Fourier transform or short-term Fourier transform (STFT), a Fourier transform during a short term of time, used in the area of signal analysis
- Fractional Fourier transform (FRFT), a linear transformation generalizing the Fourier transform, used in the area of harmonic analysis
- Discrete-time Fourier transform (DTFT), the reverse of the Fourier series, a special case of the Z-transform around the unit circle in the complex plane
- Discrete Fourier transform (DFT), occasionally called the finite Fourier transform, the Fourier transform of a discrete periodic sequence (yielding discrete periodic frequencies), which can also be thought of as the DTFT of a finite-length sequence evaluated at discrete frequencies
- Fast Fourier transform (FFT), a fast algorithm for computing a discrete Fourier transform
- Generalized Fourier series, generalizations of Fourier series that are special cases of decompositions over an orthonormal basis of an inner product space

== In physics and engineering ==
- The Fourier number ($\mathit{Fo}$) (also known as the Fourier modulus), a ratio $\alpha t/d^2$ of the rate of heat conduction $\alpha t$ to the rate of thermal energy storage $d^2$
- Fourier-transform spectroscopy, a measurement technique whereby spectra are collected based on measurements of the temporal coherence of a radiative source

== See also ==
- List of Fourier-related transforms, a list of linear transformations of functions related to Fourier analysis
- Fourier (crater)
- Fourier (company), a Chinese robotics company
- Fourier Island, small rocky island near Cape Mousse, Antarctica
