= Fourrier =

Fourrier is a surname. Notable people with the surname include:

- Bertrand Fourrier
- Guillaume Fourrier (born 1941), French fisherman
- Marguerite Fourrier, French tennis player at the 1900 Summer Olympics

== See also ==
- Fourrier, a former rank in the French army
- Fourier
- Fourie
