= Carel Fourie =

South African rugby union footballer

- Born: Carel Fourie; 1 August 1950 Uitenhage, Eastern Cape
- Died: 5 May 1997 (aged 46) Johannesburg, Gauteng
- Height: 1.80 m (5 ft 11 in)
- Weight: 84 kg (185 lb)
- School: Hoërskool Brandwag, Uitenhage
- Notable relative: Polla Fourie (brother)

Rugby union career
Provincial / State sides
Years	Team	Apps	(Points)
- North East Cape
- Eastern Province
International career
Years	Team	Apps	(Points)
1974–1975	South Africa	4	(10)

Carel 'Tossie' Fourie (1 August 1950 – 5 May 1997) was a South African rugby union player.

== Playing career ==
Fourie played provincial rugby for North Eastern Cape and Eastern Province and during 1972 toured with Gazelles, a South African under-24 team, to Argentina. Fourie scored 22 tries during the tour, the most by a Gazelles player and ten more than second most scored by Gerrie Germishuys. His 92 points scored, were the second most points for the South Africans, behind the 110 scored by Jackie Snyman.

Fourie toured with the Springboks to France in 1974 and made his test debut against France on 23 November 1974 in Toulouse. He played in both test matches on the French tour and a further two tests during the return tour of the French to South Africa in 1975. He scored ten points in test matches and also played in five tour matches, scoring a further four points.

=== Test history ===
No.	Opposition	Result (SA 1st)	Position	Points	Dates	Venue
1.	France	13–4	Wing	3 (1 penalty)	23 November 1974	Stade Municipal, Toulouse
2.	France	10–8	Wing		30 November 1974	Parc des Princes, Paris
3.	France	38–25	Wing		21 June 1975	Free State Stadium, Bloemfontein
4.	France	33–18	Wing	7 (1 try, 1 penalty)	28 June 1975	Loftus Versfeld, Pretoria

== Accolades ==
Fourie was named one of the five SA Rugby players of the Year for 1972. The four other players named, were two members of the 1972 England team that toured South Africa, namely Sam Doble and John Pullin, as well as the South African lock forward, Kevin de Klerk and flanker Jan Ellis.

== See also ==
- List of South Africa national rugby union players – Springbok no. 481
