= Polla Fourie =

South African rugby union footballer

- Born: Theodorus Theunis Fourie; 10 July 1945 (age 81) Uitenhage, Eastern Cape
- Height: 1.88 m (6 ft 2 in)
- Weight: 91 kg (201 lb)
- School: Hoërskool Brandwag, Uitenhage
- Notable relative: Carel Fourie (brother)

Rugby union career
Provincial / State sides
| Years | Team | Apps | (Points) |
- South Eastern Transvaal
International career
| Years | Team | Apps | (Points) |
| 1974 | South Africa | 1 | |

Theodorus Theunis 'Polla' Fourie (born 10 July 1945) is a former South African rugby union player.

== Playing career ==
Fourie played provincial rugby for South Eastern Transvaal and was the first player from the union that was selected to play for the Springboks in a test match.

Fourie played in only one test match for the Springboks, the third test against the 1974 Lions at the Boet Erasmus Stadium in Port Elizabeth. He then toured with the Springboks to France at the end of 1974 and one of his fellow tourists was his brother, Carel. Fourie played in four tour matches, scoring three tries.

=== Test history ===
| No. | Opposition | Result (SA 1st) | Position | Points | Dates | Venue |
|---|---|---|---|---|---|---|
| 1. | British Lions | 9–26 | Flank | | 13 July 1974 | Boet Erasmus Stadium, Port Elizabeth |

== See also ==
- List of South Africa national rugby union players – Springbok no. 476
