= CJ Velleman =

South African rugby union player (born 1995)

- Full name: Cyril John Velleman
- Born: 24 February 1995 (age 31) Somerset East, South Africa
- Height: 1.78 m (5 ft 10 in)
- Weight: 90 kg (200 lb; 14 st 2 lb)
- School: Grey High School, Port Elizabeth
- University: Nelson Mandela Metropolitan University

Rugby union career
- Position: Flanker
Youth career
- 2011–2016: Eastern Province Kings
2015	NMMU Madibaz	6	(10)
Senior career
Years	Team	Apps	(Points)
2014	Eastern Province Kings	3	(0)
2016–2020	Southern Kings	20	(5)
2020	Griquas	3	(0)
2021 & 2025	Eastern Province Elephants	0	(0)
- Correct as of 12 June 2025

Cyril John Velleman (born 24 February 1995) is a South African rugby union player for Western Province in the Currie Cup. His regular position is flanker.

== Career ==
=== Youth (2011–13) ===
Velleman was the captain for his school Grey High School at various youth levels, including the first team in 2012 and 2013. He also represented Eastern Province as various youth levels; he captained their Under-16 side at the 2011 Grant Khomo Week and played for their Under-18 side at the 2012 and 2013 Craven Week tournaments, also captaining Eastern Province at the latter tournament held in Polokwane.

=== Eastern Province Kings / NMMU Madibaz (2014–15) ===
Velleman was included in the Eastern Province Kings squad for the 2014 Vodacom Cup and made his first class debut on 15 March 2014 (a few days short of his 19th birthday) in their 60–6 victory over rivals Border Bulldogs in Grahamstown. A substitute appearance followed in their match against Western Province, as well as one more start against a Free State XV in Cradock.

In the second half of 2014, he captained the Eastern Province U19 team in the Under-19 Provincial Championship, his side's first season in Group A of the competition after they won promotion from Group B at the end of 2013. He started the season by scoring Eastern Province's second try in a 17–29 defeat to defending champions the Blue Bulls U19 and maintained a good try-scoring record throughout the eleven matches that he played during season, scoring home-and-away against both the Golden Lions U19, and the Leopards U19, as well as a try at home against Western Province U19 with his six tries making him Eastern Province's second-highest try scorer and points scorer behind fullback Malcolm Jaer. He was promoted to the Eastern Province U21 side for their final two matches of the 2014 Under-21 Provincial Championship; with the Under-21 team already having finished top of Group B by winning all seven of their matches during the regular season, Velleman joined them for the semi-final match against Limpopo Blue Bulls U21. He helped them to a 28–26 win in that match and scored a try in a 46–3 victory over SWD U21 in the final a week later to be crowned Group B champions. Velleman scored two tries in their subsequent promotion play-off match against Eastern Cape rivals Border U21, helping them to a 64–9 victory and a place in Group A of the competition in 2015.

At the start of 2015, Velleman played in the 2015 Varsity Cup tournament for the NMMU Madibaz. He made six appearances for the team as they finished in seventh position; it was a disappointing season for an NMMU side that qualified for the semi-finals in the last two competitions, but Velleman made his mark by scoring tries in their matches against NWU Pukke and UJ.

In March 2015, Velleman was named in an extended South Africa Under-20 training group as part of their preparation for the 2015 World Rugby Under 20 Championship. He featured for them in a friendly match against a Varsity Cup Dream Team in April 2015. He was included in the S.A. Under-20 squad that toured Argentina in May 2015 and started their first match, a 25–22 victory over Argentina. He didn't feature in the second match and also missed out on the final squad for the 2015 World Rugby Under 20 Championship.

Velleman was the vice-captain of the Eastern Province U21 side in their first season in Group A of the Under-21 Provincial Championship following promotion from Group B in 2014. The team struggled throughout the competition, winning just one of their twelve matches to finish bottom of the log. Velleman scored two tries in a 24–40 defeat to the Golden Lions U21s and one more in their 31–45 defeat to Western Province U21, making seven starts during the competition, with injuries restricting his appearances.

=== Southern Kings (2016–) ===
In December 2015, Velleman was one of the first twenty players that signed contracts to play for the Southern Kings in the 2016 Super Rugby season.

Club Rugby (2024)

Velleman played for Connect NTK RFC in the 2024 season in WPRFU, Super A league competition for the club.

Caps : 2
