= Tabbie du Plessis =

South African rugby union player

- Full name: Francois Theodorus du Plessis
- Born: 10 December 1992 (age 33) Bethlehem, South Africa
- Height: 1.83 m (6 ft 0 in)
- Weight: 114 kg (251 lb; 17 st 13 lb)
- School: Grey College, Bloemfontein
- University: University of the Free State
- Notable relative(s): Bismarck du Plessis (brother) & Jannie du Plessis (brother)

Rugby union career
- Position: Hooker
Youth career
- 2010: Free State Cheetahs
Senior career
Years	Team	Apps	(Points)
2014	Eastern Province Kings	3	(0)
- Correct as of 5 March 2014

Francois Theodorus "Tabbie" du Plessis (born 10 December 1992) is a South African rugby union player. His regular position is hooker.

== Career ==
=== Youth ===
Du Plessis was born in Bethlehem, Free State. In 2010, du Plessis was part of the Free State U19 squad that played in the Under-19 Provincial Championships. He also played club rugby for amateur side Bethlehem Oud-Skoliere (Bethlehem Old Boys).

=== Eastern Province Kings ===
He joined the Eastern Province Kings on trial at the start of 2014. He made his senior debut for the Eastern Province Kings in the 2014 Vodacom Cup by coming on as a substitute in their 17–10 opening day defeat to Kenyan side Simba XV and also played in their matches against the Border Bulldogs and Western Province.

However, he was not retained for the Kings' Currie Cup campaign and he returned to playing club rugby in the Free State.

== Personal ==
Du Plessis is the younger brother of Springboks Bismarck and Jannie.
