= Bismarck du Plessis =

South African rugby union player

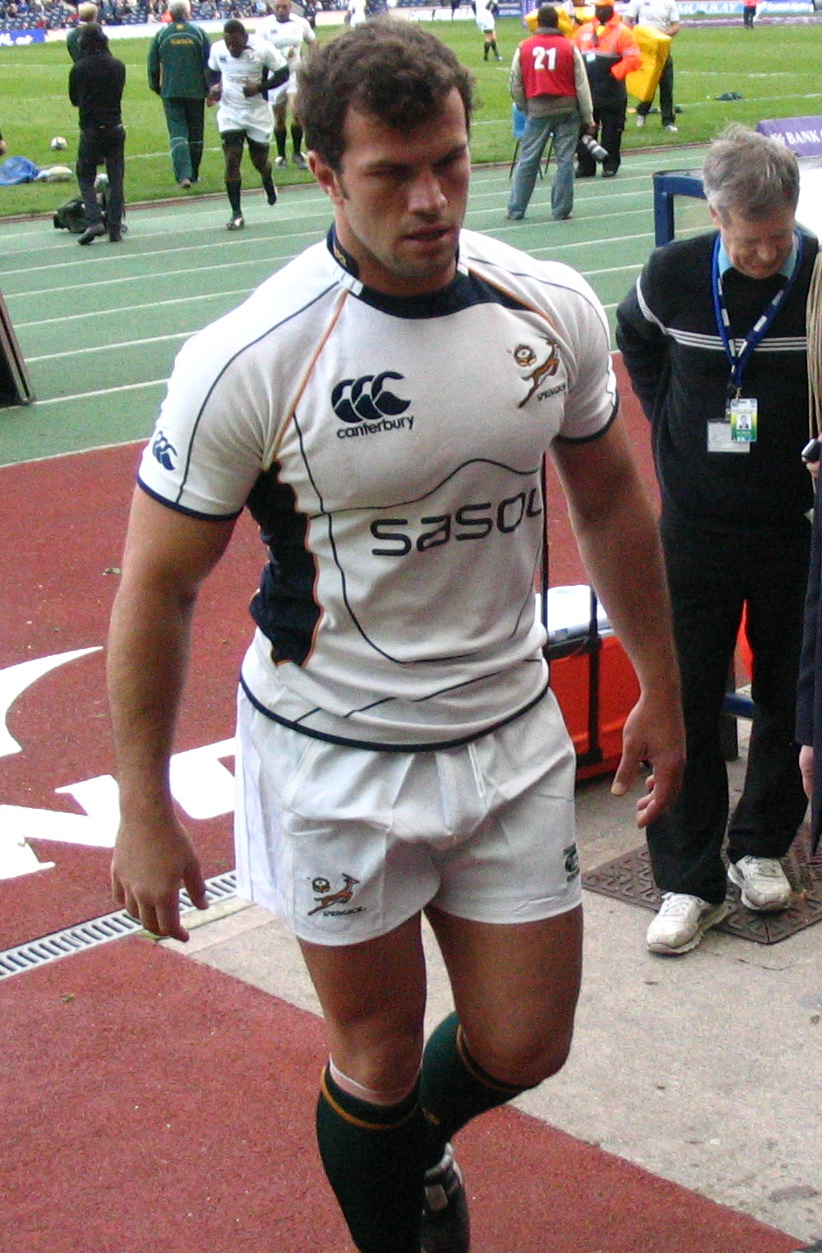
- Born: Bismarck Wilhelm du Plessis; 22 May 1984 (age 42) Bethlehem, Orange Free State, Republic of South Africa
- Height: 1.88 m (6 ft 2 in)
- Weight: 114 kg (251 lb; 17 st 13 lb)
- School: Grey College, Bloemfontein
- University: University of the Free State
- Notable relative(s): Jannie du Plessis (brother); Tabbie du Plessis (brother)

Rugby union career
- Position: Hooker
- Current team: Bulls / Blue Bulls
Senior career
Years	Team	Apps	(Points)
2015–2021	Montpellier	108	(135)
2021–2023	Bulls	29	(25)
Provincial / State sides
Years	Team	Apps	(Points)
2003	Free State Cheetahs	2	(0)
2005–2015	Sharks (Currie Cup)	39	(50)
2022–2023	Blue Bulls	7	(15)
- Correct as of 3 April 2023
Super Rugby
Years	Team	Apps	(Points)
2005–2015	Sharks	131	(100)
- Correct as of 14 June 2015
International career
Years	Team	Apps	(Points)
2005	South Africa Under-21	1	(0)
2007–2015	South Africa (test)	79	(55)
2007	South Africa (tour) (Note: In addition to playing in test matches, Du Plessis featured in four non-test matches for South Africa. Two of these were international tour matches in 2007, and in 2014 and 2015, he played in matches against a World XV in Cape Town. These matches have an equivalent status to international tour matches, but were played on home soil.)	2	(0)
2014–2015	Springboks	2	(10)
- Correct as of 30 October 2015
Medal record
Men's Rugby union
Representing South Africa
Rugby World Cup
Gold medal – first place	2007 France	Squad
Bronze medal – third place	2015 England	Squad

Bismarck Wilhelm du Plessis (born 22 May 1984) is a South African former professional rugby union player, who played for the Bulls in the United Rugby Championship and for the Blue Bulls in the Currie Cup. He played for the Free State Cheetahs in 2003, before moving to the Sharks in 2005 where he spent the bulk of his career, and then to Montpellier in the French Top 14. He is widely acknowledged to be one of the best hookers of his time, both in club and country performances.

== Personal life ==
Bismarck du Plessis is married to Anja du Plessis (née van Zyl) since late 2015, shortly before moving to France for his tenure in Montpellier. The couple has five children together, including a set of twin sons and twin girls.

== Career ==
A native of the town of Bethlehem in the Free State province, Bismarck du Plessis made his debut for the Sharks in Super Rugby (then the Super 12) in 2005. As he plays hooker and played in the same team as South Africa's past captain, John Smit, for much of his career he had been a backup to Smit; however, this changed when Smit moved to tighthead prop. Before Smit's change of position, Du Plessis nonetheless played in Super Rugby and the Currie Cup whenever Smit was unavailable, and in 2007 was selected to play for South Africa in the Tri Nations Series. He made his debut for South Africa as a substitute in the same game against Australia in Sydney in which his older brother, Jannie, who was in the starting XV, also made his Springboks debut. The Du Plessis brothers became the 23rd set of brothers to earn caps for South Africa at rugby union.

Following an illness to Pierre Spies, Bismarck du Plessis was called into South Africa's squad for the 2007 Rugby World Cup; his brother Jannie was a later addition to the squad, replacing BJ Botha, who injured a knee in South Africa's final pool match against the USA.

During the 2008 end-of-year Test series, the Springboks moved Smit to tighthead in order to accommodate both him and the younger, faster Du Plessis in the front row together; this change has continued through the 2009 Super 14 season and into the Boks' 2009 Test season.

After South Africa's second game of the 2008 Tri Nations Series, against New Zealand, Du Plessis was cited for an eye-gouge on New Zealand's Adam Thomson. At the subsequent disciplinary hearing, which was the first of his career, the judicial officer found that his action had been "careless", not deliberate, and imposed a three-week suspension, a significantly lower penalty than the three-to-six months' suspensions routinely imposed for deliberate eye-gouging.

== 2012–2015 ==
Du Plessis was selected for the 2011 Rugby World Cup along with his brother Jannie. He came off the bench against Wales in which South Africa won 17–16. He then won a man of the match performance in June 2012 against England in the second test and also scored a try as the Springboks won 36-27 thanks to a late try from right winger JP Pietersen. During the 2013 Rugby Championship, Du Plessis received two yellow cards in a match against New Zealand and was then issued a red card. The IRB later admitted an error in one of the yellow cards. This red card was later overturned by the IRB and struck from Du Plessis' record. Bismarck has since featured prominently for the Springboks, being first-choice hooker. He was also selected for the 2015 Rugby World Cup.
