= Jaco Fourie =

South African equestrian

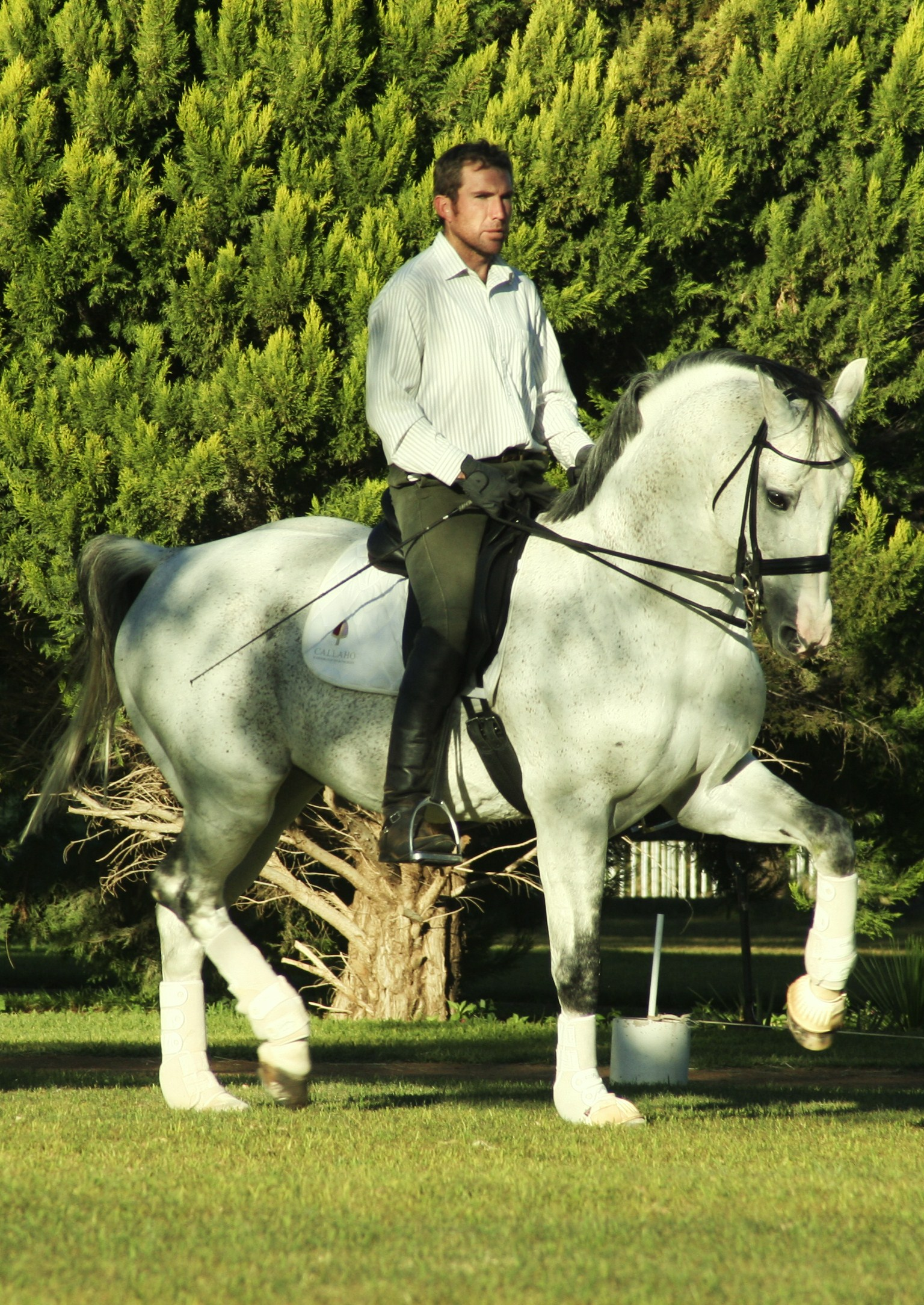
- Jaco Fourie riding CALLAHO's Granulit

Personal information
- Full name: Jakobus Fourie
- Nickname: Jaco Fourie
- Nationality: South Africa
- Born: 30 July 1975 (age 50) Pretoria, Gauteng
- Height: 1.83 m (6 ft 0 in)

Sport
- Country: South Africa
- Sport: Equestrian
Medal record
Gold medal – first place	2005 FEI World Dressage Challenge	CALLAHO's For Joy
Bronze medal – third place	2006 FEI World Dressage Challenge	CALLAHO's Granulit
Silver medal – second place	2009 FEI World Dressage Challenge	CALLAHO's Rosengirl
Gold medal – first place	2012 FEI World Dressage Challenge	AREION's Deja Vu
Gold medal – first place	2006 SA Individual Freestyle Championship	CALLAHO's For Joy
Gold medal – first place	2007 SA Individual Freestyle Championship	CALLAHO's Granulit
Silver medal – second place	2007 SA Individual Freestyle Championship	CALLAHO's For Joy
Gold medal – first place	2008 SA Intermediate I Freestyle Championship	CALLAHO's Rosengirl
Bronze medal – third place	2009 SA Individual Freestyle Championship	CALLAHO's Rosengirl
Silver medal – second place	2010 SA Individual Freestyle Championship	CALLAHO's Rosengirl
Silver medal – second place	2006 SA Individual Technical Championship	CALLAHO's For Joy
Silver medal – second place	2007 SA Individual Technical Championship	CALLAHO's For Joy
Gold medal – first place	2008 SA Prix St Georges Championship	CALLAHO's Rosengirl
Silver medal – second place	2010 SA Individual Technical Championship	CALLAHO's Rosengirl
Bronze medal – third place	2013 SA Advanced Freestyle Championship	AREION's Deja Vu
Gold medal – first place	2013 FEI Young Horse Championship CDI3* Midrand	Dawn Neman's Callaho Rinaldo
Bronze medal – third place	2023 SA Individual Technical Championship	Callaho Bugatti
Silver medal – second place	2023 SA Individual Freestyle Championship	Callaho Bugatti

Jaco Fourie is a South African equestrian athlete and SA National Champion in dressage. He moved from Kimberley, South Africa and now resides in Cape Town, South Africa. He appeared on the cover of the May 2007 edition of the SA Horseman Magazine. He married Magda Fourie in 2009 and together they have 2 daughters, Hanneke and Adelinde and a son Andrè Fourie. The couple own and manage Areion Warmblood Horses & Dressage Academy. His wife, Magda, died on 26 July 2019 and he has been a single father ever since.

== Riding career ==
Jaco Fourie started his riding career in the family business of his father and 2 brothers at the age of 4, and was tutored and mentored by many riding professionals to young adulthood. He had training from bereiters and instructors from the Spanish Riding School in Vienna, the SA Lipizzaner Centre, Natalie Hobday and Jonny Hilberath (GER).

His first Free State Provincial Colours were awarded in 2003, and received his National Protea Colours for dressage in 2007. Fourie has represented his home-country, South Africa in the Equestrian Tri-Nations Competition on two occasions in 2007 and 2008 in Hawke's Bay, New Zealand. He won the SA Championships in 2006, 2007 and 2008. He also won the FEI World Dressage Challenge in 2005. He is the leading South African rider in the South African National Equestrian Federation's dressage rankings.

He worked full-time as stud manager for CALLAHO Warmblood Sport Horses, a South African based horse breeding stud farm, who is also a major sponsor of international riders, but has since moved onto his own property where he owns & manages Areion Warmblood Horses & Dressage Academy. He has subsequently followed a parallel career as equestrian dressage coach, and coach developer for the South African Equestrian Federation, designated as National Coach Education Advisor (NCEA) by SASCA in 2020.

== Horses ==
His first pony was a crossbred Welsh pony named Prins. In dressage, Fourie rode CALLAHO's For Joy, CALLAHO's Granulit, CALLAHO's Rosengirl, CALLAHO's Benicio and AREION's Deja Vu to National honours. However, he had various other successes with horses FD Ref's Asterix, Etherow Impasse, Brandenburg Super C, Alzu Catapault, Kehilan Shaheer, Orly and Kingsdale Kildaire amongst others. His current rising star is a Hanoverian stallion "FHM" whom he is training in dressage.
