= Malcolm Jaer =

South African rugby union player (born 1995)

- Full name: Malcolm Adrian Emile Jaer
- Born: 29 June 1995 (age 31) Uitenhage, South Africa
- Height: 1.74 m (5 ft 8 1/2 in)
- Weight: 72 kg (159 lb; 11 st 5 lb)
- School: Hoërskool Brandwag, Uitenhage

Rugby union career
- Position: Fullback / Fly-half
- Current team: Griquas
Youth career
- 2011–2016: Eastern Province Kings
Senior career
Years	Team	Apps	(Points)
2014–2017	Eastern Province Kings	2	(5)
2016–2017	Southern Kings	19	(40)
2017–2022	Free State Cheetahs	15	(20)
2017–2022	Cheetahs	22	(50)
2023–	Griquas		
- Correct as of 13 March 2023
International career
Years	Team	Apps	(Points)
2013	South Africa Schools	1	(0)
2015	South Africa Under-20	3	(5)
- Correct as of 22 June 2015

Malcolm Adrian Emile Jaer (born 29 June 1995) is a South African rugby union player for the Cheetahs in the Pro14 and the Free State Cheetahs in the Currie Cup. His regular position is fullback or fly-half.

== Career ==
=== 2011–2013 : Youth and South African Schools ===
Jaer played secondary school rugby for Hoërskool Brandwag in Uitenhage. He was selected in the Eastern Province Under-16 squad that played at the Grant Khomo Week tournament in 2011, in their Under-18 squad that played at the Academy Week in 2012 and their Under-18 squad that played at the Craven Week tournament in 2013. He scored a try for the Eastern Province in the latter competition, in their 21–32 defeat to the Free State.

Jaer's performances at the 2013 Craven Week led to his inclusion in the South African Schools side and he made one appearance for them in a 17–13 victory against France in George in August 2013.

=== 2014–2015 : Eastern Province Kings and South Africa Under-20 ===
After finishing school, Jaer joined the Eastern Province Academy and was included in the Eastern Province Kings senior squad during the 2014 Vodacom Cup competition. He made his debut on 25 April 2014, aged just 18, starting their match against the previously-unbeaten Sharks in Durban, in which he helped them to a 27–11 victory.

In the second half of 2014, Jaer started all twelve of the Eastern Province U19 team's matches in the Under-19 Provincial Championship, his side's first season in Group A of the competition after they won promotion from Group B at the end of 2013. In his second match for the team, Jaer scored his first try in a 13–16 home defeat to the Golden Lions U19s. He scored two tries in their 32–26 victory over the Leopards U19s in Potchefstroom and a further two in the return match in Port Elizabeth. He also scored two tries in their defeat to the Blue Bulls U19s and one more in their 20–21 defeat away to Western Province U21. That meant he ended the competition as his side's leading try scorer, with eight tries overall. In addition, he took over the kicking duties from Jason Vers after three matches and contributed 64 points with the boot (through fourteen penalties and eleven conversions), to finish on 104 points, the highest by an Eastern Province player and fourth overall in Group A of the competition. He was promoted to the Eastern Province U21 side for their final two matches of the 2014 Under-21 Provincial Championship; with the Under-21 team already having finished top of Group B by winning all seven of their matches during the regular season, Jaer joined them for the semi-final match against Limpopo Blue Bulls U21. He helped them to a 28–26 win in that match and also started in a 46–3 victory over SWD U21 in the final a week later to be crowned Group B champions. Jaer scored a try in their subsequent promotion play-off match against Eastern Cape rivals Border U21, helping them to a 64–9 victory and a place in Group A of the competition in 2015.

In March 2015, Jaer was named in an extended South Africa Under-20 training group as part of their preparation for the 2015 World Rugby Under 20 Championship. While he didn't feature in a friendly match against a Varsity Cup Dream Team in April 2015, he was included in the squad that toured Argentina in May 2015. He started their first match, scoring a try in a 25–22 win, but didn't feature in the second match. Upon the team's return, he was named in the final squad for the 2015 World Rugby Under 20 Championship. He played off the bench in the first of their three matches in Pool B of the competition, a 33–5 win against hosts Italy, but was not named in the matchday squad for their 40–8 win against Samoa or their 46–13 win over Australia, which saw South Africa finish top of Pool B to qualify for the semi-finals with the best record pool stage of all the teams in the competition. Jaer was used as a replacement in their semi-final match against England and scored South Africa's first try of the match in the 77th minute, but could not prevent them losing 20–28 to be eliminated from the competition by England for the second year in succession. He started his first match of the competition in their third-place play-off match against France, helping South Africa to a 31–18 win to secure third place in the competition.

Jaer returned to domestic rugby to play for the Eastern Province U21 side in their first season in Group A of the Under-21 Provincial Championship following promotion from Group B in 2014. The team struggled throughout the competition, winning just one of their twelve matches to finish bottom of the log. He scored tries in their home and away matches against the Leopards, as well as in their matches against Western Province U21 and Blue Bulls U21, also kicking two conversions in his ten starts during the competition.

=== 2016–present : Southern Kings ===
In December 2015, Jaer was one of the first twenty players that signed contracts to play for the Southern Kings in the 2016 Super Rugby season.
