= Jo Fourie =

South African ethnomusicologist (1884–1973)

Johanna Everharda La Riviere Fourie
- Born: Johanna Everharda La Rivière; September 17, 1884; Zwolle, Netherlands
- Died: October 22, 1973 (aged 89); South Africa
- Other name: Jo Fourie
- Education: Licenciate in piano, Koninklike Nederlandse Toonkunstenaarsvereniging
- Occupation: Ethnomusicologist
- Known for: Documenting and preserving boeremusiek
- Spouse: H.C.M (Herman) Fourie
- Children: Hugo Fourie

Johanna Everharda La Rivière Fourie (1884–1973), often referred to as Jo Fourie, was South Africa’s first woman ethnomusicologist. Her work from the 1930s to the 1960s focused on documenting boeremusiek—a genre of rural Afrikaner folk music—and played a crucial role in its preservation. However, her ethnomusicological approach, shaped by the cultural and political climate of apartheid-era South Africa, has been the subject of both recognition and critique.

== Early life and musical background ==
Fourie was born on 17 September 1884 in Zwolle, the Netherlands. She received formal classical music training and earned a licenciate in piano from the Koninklike Nederlandse Toonkunstenaarsvereniging. In 1910, she emigrated to South Africa after marrying Herman Fourie, a South African theology student who later contributed to the first Afrikaans translation of the Bible. Initially, Fourie’s musical career in South Africa involved teaching and playing the church organ, with no particular interest in local folk traditions like boeremusiek. Her relationship with the genre only began after the family relocated to Groot Marico in the 1930s.

A pivotal moment occurred in 1934 when Fourie, while visiting the Dutch East Indies, heard boeremusiek being broadcast on the radio. This event, which she described as an epiphany, sparked her lifelong interest in the genre. It marked a turning point in her career, leading her to become a dedicated advocate for the preservation of boeremusiek, a music she once viewed with skepticism.

== Ethnomusicological fieldwork ==
Over the course of her career, Jo Fourie conducted extensive fieldwork across South Africa, collecting and transcribing more than 300 boeremusiek tunes, primarily from rural areas in what was then the Northern and Western Transvaal. Her work involved not just musical transcription but also documenting the social contexts, personal histories, and performance practices of the musicians she encountered.

Fourie’s contributions to the preservation of boeremusiek were significant. At a time when the music was being displaced by modern, urban sounds, her efforts ensured that a large repertoire of tunes and traditions were preserved for future generations. Her transcriptions provided the foundation for many later studies on Afrikaner folk music and contributed to the national recognition of boeremusiek as a distinctive part of South African heritage.

Nevertheless, her approach reflected her classical European training, and she often imposed Western musical structures on the music that didn’t align with the fluid, improvisational nature of boeremusiek. Her emphasis on "authentic" boeremusiek was selective, focusing on traditional, rural forms while overlooking the evolving, hybrid versions of the genre emerging in urban areas. This idealized vision of boeremusiek as a pure, rural expression of Afrikaner identity has been critiqued for glossing over the genre’s creole roots and its connections to other marginalized communities.

== Archival holdings and transcriptions ==
Fourie’s legacy is preserved in the Jo Fourie Collection, housed at the National Film, Video and Sound Archives in Pretoria. The collection includes:

- Over 1,000 transcriptions of boeremusiek tunes
- Five diaries documenting her fieldwork
- Twelve notebooks of notations and ethnographic notes
- Personal correspondence and photographs
- Fragments of an unfinished memoir

While this collection is a vital resource for scholars, it also reflects the biases of her approach. Her transcriptions favor a static, "pure" form of boeremusiek over the more dynamic, hybrid versions that were becoming popular in urban centers during her lifetime.

== Uit die jaar vroeg: Bringing boeremusiek to the public ==
In 1952, Fourie’s work reached a national audience through the South African Broadcasting Corporation’s (SABC) radio program Uit die jaar vroeg ("From Years of Yore"). The program featured performances of boeremusiek tunes that Fourie had collected, aiming to preserve the genre by broadcasting it to a wider audience. This marked an important milestone in bringing boeremusiek into public consciousness, and Fourie’s contributions were central to the program’s success.

However, the program also highlighted some of the tensions inherent in Fourie’s work. The orchestras chosen to perform the music, including those led by Hendrik Susan and Hansie van Loggerenberg, often introduced modern elements such as jazz rhythms and syncopation, which clashed with Fourie’s more traditional, purist approach. This reflected the challenges of preserving an older, rural musical tradition in the face of rapid social and cultural change.

== Critical perspectives on Fourie's legacy ==
Jo Fourie’s work as South Africa’s first female ethnomusicologist was pioneering. She played a key role in preserving an important part of the country’s cultural heritage at a time when boeremusiek was at risk of being forgotten, and her careful documentation helped ensure that this music would endure and be recognized as an integral part of Afrikaner identity.

At the same time, Fourie’s vision of boeremusiek was shaped by the racial and political context of apartheid South Africa. Her focus on an idealized version of the genre as a symbol of rural Afrikaner purity often excluded the genre’s more diverse influences, including its creole roots and connections to black and colored South African traditions. Her work has been critiqued for reinforcing an exclusionary, nationalist narrative, rather than acknowledging the broader social and cultural dynamics at play in South African music.
