= Jannie du Plessis =

South African rugby union player

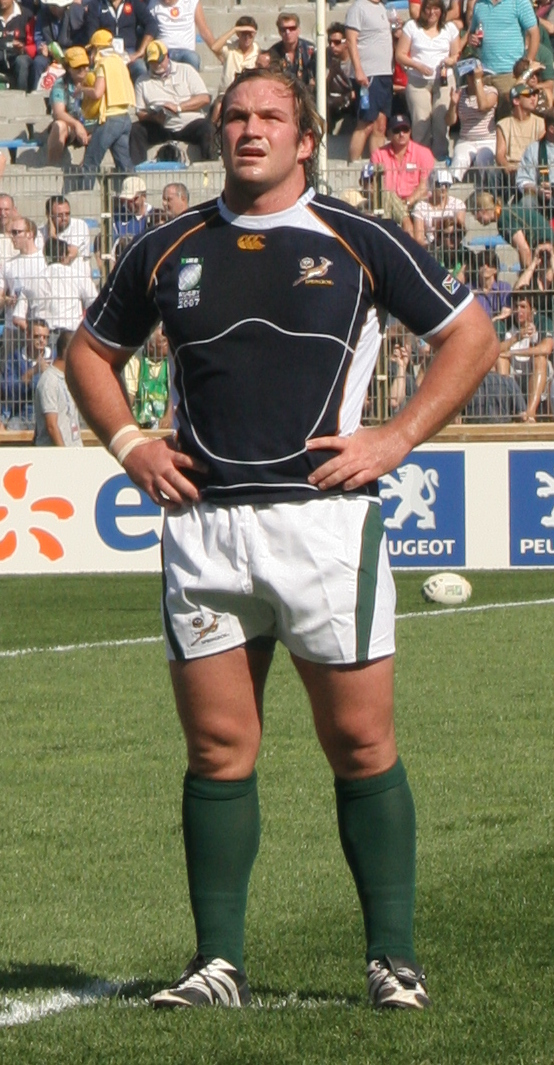
- South Africa vs Fiji during 2007 Rugby World Cup
- Born: Jan Nathaniël du Plessis; 16 November 1982 (age 44) Bethlehem, Free State, South Africa
- Height: 1.88 m (6 ft 2 in)
- Weight: 121 kg (267 lb; 19 st 1 lb)
- School: Grey College, Bloemfontein
- University: University of the Free State
- Notable relative(s): Bismarck du Plessis (brother); Tabbie du Plessis (brother)
- Occupation(s): Doctor, professional rugby union player, Head Coach of Hoerskool Monument High

Rugby union career
- Position: Prop
Senior career
Years	Team	Apps	(Points)
2015–2019	Montpellier	74	(10)
Provincial / State sides
Years	Team	Apps	(Points)
2003–2007	Free State Cheetahs	69	(15)
2008–2015	Sharks (Currie Cup)	35	(15)
2020–2022	Golden Lions	11	(5)
- Correct as of 10 May 2022
Super Rugby
Years	Team	Apps	(Points)
2006–2007	Cheetahs	26	(0)
2008–2015	Sharks	119	(0)
2020–2022	Lions	10	(0)
- Correct as of 16 September 2022
International career
Years	Team	Apps	(Points)
2003	South Africa Under-21	4	(0)
2007–2015	South Africa (test)	70	(5)
2007 & 2009	South Africa (tour) (Note: In addition to playing in test matches, Du Plessis featured in four non-test matches for South Africa. Two of these were international tour matches in 2007 and 2009, and in 2014 and 2015, he played in matches against a World XV in Cape Town. These matches have an equivalent status to international tour matches, but were played on home soil)	2	(0)
2014–2015	Springboks	2	(0)
- Correct as of 30 October 2015
Medal record
Men's Rugby union
Representing South Africa
Rugby World Cup
Gold medal – first place	2007 France	Squad
Bronze medal – third place	2015 England	Squad

Jan Nathaniel du Plessis (born 16 November 1982 in Bethlehem, Free State) is a former South African rugby union player, who played as a prop for Montpellier in the French Top 14 and the Lions in Super Rugby. He played for the Free State Cheetahs in the Currie Cup and the Cheetahs in Super Rugby until 2007, when he joined Durban-based side the Sharks, where he played until 2015. He won 70 caps for South Africa between 2007 and 2015.

== Personal and early life ==
Du Plessis showed promise as a rugby player early, being named as captain of the Eastern Free State age-group team at Craven Week in 1995. While he continued to advance in rugby, playing for Free State representative teams at under-18 and under-19 level, he never represented South Africa at junior level.

He studied medicine at the University of the Free State and worked as a doctor, making him one of the few players in the professional era of rugby union to have another career outside of the sport.

== Rugby career ==
He eventually made the senior Free State Cheetahs side in 2003, and continued playing for the Cheetahs through the 2007 Currie Cup. Du Plessis was also named to a South African squad that faced a World XV at Ellis Park in 2006.

Du Plessis made his Super 14 debut in 2006 for the Cheetahs. His 2007 Super 14 campaign was hampered by an ankle injury. After recovering, he was selected for the Springboks squad for the first time during the 2007 Tri Nations, making his debut in the starting XV on 7 July against Australia during the Boks' home leg. The match was significant for him in another way, as his younger brother Bismarck made his Boks debut as a substitute in the same match while he was still on the field. This made the Du Plessis brothers the 23rd set of brothers to earn Springboks caps.

Neither Jannie nor Bismarck was named to the Springboks' original squad for the 2007 Rugby World Cup, but both eventually joined the squad. After Bismarck had already been called up to replace Pierre Spies, Jannie was called up to replace BJ Botha after Botha blew out a knee against the USA in the Boks' final pool match. He received the call notifying him of his selection from Springboks selection panel member Peter Jooste early in the morning of 1 October, shortly after finishing an all-night shift at a Bloemfontein hospital on the evening of 30 September, during which he performed a Caesarean section. When interviewed after his selection, he said that his first sleep since 29 September was "an hour or so on the plane from Bloemfontein to Cape Town", where he travelled to do his required paperwork before joining the Boks in France. On 7 October, he was starting for the Boks in their quarterfinal against Fiji, after CJ van der Linde was ruled out with a knee injury.

A week after the Boks' victory over England in the Rugby World Cup final, Du Plessis was in the squad for another final – the 2007 Currie Cup final, in which the Cheetahs defeated the Golden Lions 20–18. Because of his late call-up to the World Cup squad, he was the only member of the World Cup winners to play in enough Currie Cup matches to qualify for the final (at least four are required). Du Plessis joined three members of the 1995 Rugby World Cup winners as the only players to earn World Cup and Currie Cup winners' medals in the same year.

Du Plessis had to use his medical skills unexpectedly in 2009. In the early morning hours of 29 March, Brumbies lock Shawn Mackay was hit by a car outside a Durban nightclub, suffering a paralysing injury. Du Plessis was at the scene because he was helping Brumbies players get back to their hotel after their match with the Sharks; he helped Mackay breathe and contacted emergency services, who stabilised him and rushed him to a hospital. However, Mackay died from complications of his injuries several days later.
