= Izak van der Westhuizen =

South African rugby union player

- Full name: Izak Petrus van der Westhuizen
- Born: 23 January 1986 (age 40) Kimberley, South Africa
- Height: 1.96 m (6 ft 5 in)
- Weight: 111 kg (17 st 7 lb; 245 lb)
- School: Diamantveld High School
- University: University of the Free State

Rugby union career
- Position: Lock
Youth career
- 2004: Griquas
- 2005–2007: Free State Cheetahs
Senior career
| Years | Team | Apps | (Points) |
| 2007–2012 | Free State Cheetahs | 79 | (5) |
| 2008–2009 | → Griffons | 14 | (0) |
| 2010–2012 | Cheetahs | 25 | (0) |
| 2012–2014 | Edinburgh | 29 | (0) |
- Correct as of 17 June 2014

Izak Petrus van der Westhuizen (born 23 January 1986 in Kimberley) is a former South African rugby union player whose regular position was lock. He is on the Free State Cheetahs coaching staff and the head coach of the Free State XV in the Rugby Challenge.

== Career ==
=== Youth ===
Van Der Westhuizen represented Kimberley-based side Griquas at the Under-18 Craven Week in 2004 and also represented them in the Under-20 competition later in the same year.

Van Der Westhuizen then moved to Bloemfontein, where he joined the Free State Cheetahs. He represented them at Under-19 level in 2005 and at Under-21 level in 2006 and 2007.

=== Free State Cheetahs and Cheetahs ===
Van der Westhuizen made his first class debut during the 2007 Vodacom Cup, starting in Free State's opening match of the season against the Border Bulldogs in East London. Three substitute appearances followed in their next three matches before he made another start against the SWD Eagles, scoring his first (and only) try in his senior career.

Van Der Westhuizen became a regular in the Free State's Vodacom Cup side, making a total of 30 appearances in this competition between 2007 and 2011.

Van Der Westhuizen made one appearance for the Currie Cup side in 2008 – a pre-season compulsory friendly against the Leopards – but it wasn't until the 2009 season that he made his Currie Cup debut for the Free State Cheetahs, coming on as a substitute against the Sharks.

In 2010, he was also included in the Cheetahs squad for the 2010 Super 14 season. His Super Rugby debut came in their Round 9 match against the Brumbies in Canberra.

He made a total of 79 appearances for the Free State Cheetahs in the domestic Vodacom Cup and Currie Cup competitions and 25 appearances for the Cheetahs in Super Rugby.

=== Griffons ===
Van der Westhuizen also spent some time on loan at Welkom-based side the Griffons, making twelve appearances for them during the 2008 and 2009 seasons.

=== Edinburgh ===
At the conclusion of the 2012 Currie Cup Premier Division season, he joined Scottish Pro12 side Edinburgh on a two-year contract.

Despite an injury-plagued first season, where he made just 6 appearances, Van der Westhuizen recovered to become a regular for Edinburgh during the 2013–14 Pro 12 and 2013–14 Heineken Cup competitions, making a total of 29 appearances.

=== Eastern Province Kings ===
On 10 March 2014, Edinburgh announced that Van der Westhuizen would join the Eastern Province Kings prior to the 2014 Currie Cup Premier Division season on a three-year deal, subject to a medical. However, since Van der Westhuizen suffered three concussions since the start of 2014, a specialist advised that he should not play any rugby for six month to a year. He did not pass the medical at the Eastern Province Kings and the contract was subsequently cancelled.
