= Fourier Island =

Island in Adélie Land, Antarctica

- Location within Antarctica

Geography
- Location: Antarctica
- Coordinates: 66°48′S 141°30′E

Administration
- Administered under the Antarctic Treaty System

Demographics
- Population: Uninhabited

Fourier Island is a small rocky island 100 metres (0.05 nmi) off the coast and 1.4 kilometres (0.75 nmi) east-northeast of Cape Mousse, Antarctica. It was charted in 1951 by the French Antarctic Expedition and named by them for Jean-Baptiste Fourier, the French geometrician.

== See also ==
- List of Antarctic and sub-Antarctic islands
