= Hoërskool Brandwag (Uitenhage) =

Die Hoërskool Brandwag
- Uitenhage, Eastern Cape; South Africa

Information
- School type: Public
- Motto: U dienswillige dienaar
- Religious affiliation: Christianity
- Established: 1937; 89 years ago
- School district: District 9
- School number: 041 922 8188
- Grades: 8–12
- Gender: Boys & Girls
- Age: 14 to 18
- Language: Afrikaans
- Schedule: 07:30 - 14:00
- Campus: Urban Campus
- Campus type: Suburban
- Colour: Green/Gray
- Nickname: Wolfpack
- Rival: Hoërskool Framesby/Hoërskool Daniel Pienaar

Die Brandwag Hoërskool is an Afrikaans medium school in Uitenhage (in Nelson Mandela Bay Metropolitan Municipality), South Africa, with an academic orientation.

The school opened in 1937, and is named after a peak in the Drakensberg in Golden Gate Highlands National Park, called "The Sentinel" in English, which appears on the school's emblem. Its motto is "U dienswillige dienaar" (Your obedient servant), which was the title of the autobiography of Afrikaans literary figure Cornelis Jacobus Langenhoven.

Athletic teams include rugby, netball, field hockey, tennis, cross country, cricket as well as swimming.
