= 2015 Varsity Football =

Varsity Football Challenge
- Season: 2015

The 2015 Varsity Football challenge is the third season of a South African university association football competition. It involves some of the top football playing universities in the country, which belong to the University Sports Company. The tournament is run by Varsity Sports SA, and is endorsed by the South African Football Association and University Sport South Africa.

== History ==
The Varsity Cup tournament was founded in 2008, featuring the rugby teams of eight universities. Varsity Sports was expanded in 2012 to include other sporting codes. University Sport South Africa discussed the Varsity Football proposal at its 2012 annual general meeting. The idea was initially rejected, as it was seen to split the member institutions. However, it was later accepted, and 2013 was the inaugural season of Varsity Football, with an 8 team men's tournament. A four team women's tournament is also being played.

== Participating teams ==
Location of teams in 2014 Varsity Football
Blue: Men's teams only; Red: Women's teams only; Green: Men's and Women's teams.

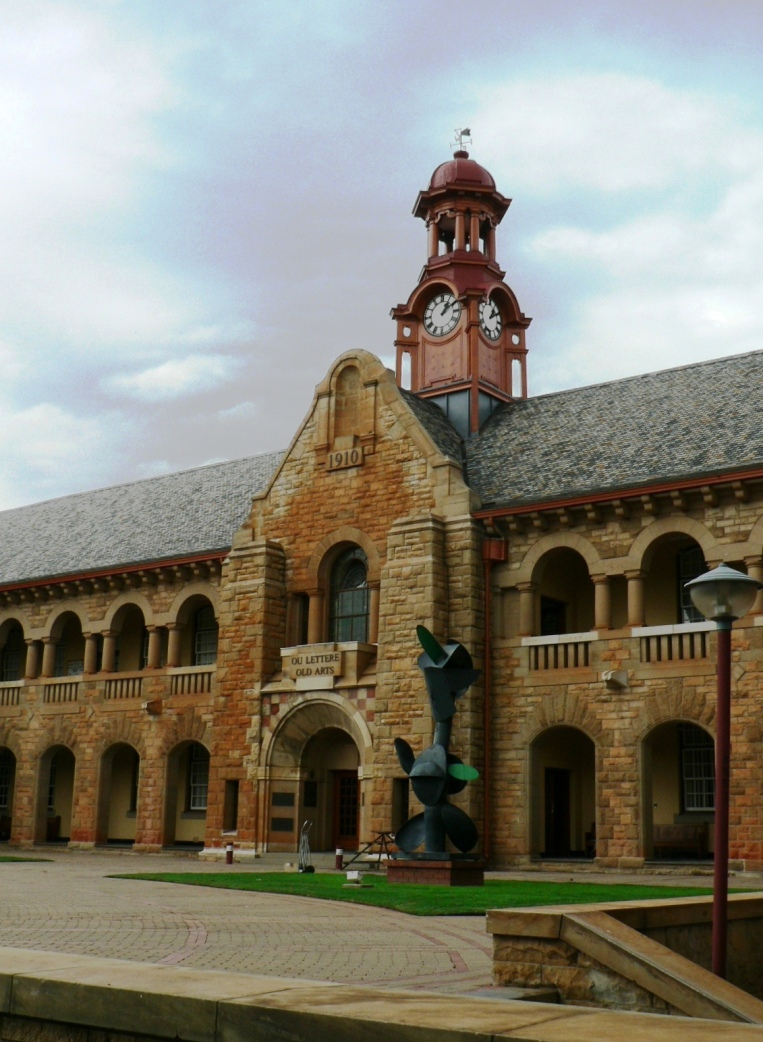
Tuks are the 2013 and 2014 Varsity Sports men's football champions

The eight teams competing in the men's Varsity Football challenge are:

Varsity Football Challenge
Team Name	University	Stadium
NMMU Madibaz	Nelson Mandela Metropolitan University	NMMU Stadium
NWU Pukke	North-West University	Fanie du Toit Sports Complex
UP-Tuks	University of Pretoria	Tuks Stadium
TUT	Tshwane University of Technology	TUT Stadium
VUT	Vaal University of Technology	Isak Steyl Stadium
UWC	University of the Western Cape	UWC Sport Stadium
WSU	Walter Sisulu University	Mthatha Campus
Wits	University of the Witwatersrand	Bidvest Stadium

=== Qualification ===
Qualification was based on the 2014 University Sports South Africa National Club Championships. In order to qualify, men's teams need to be one of the eight highest placed teams associated with Varsity Sports. Walter Sisulu University did not finish in the top 8, but was invited as the best finishing member of Varsity Sports. The University of Zululand, University of KwaZulu-Natal, Cape Peninsula University of Technology, Central University of Technology, Berea College and Durban University of Technology were all overlooked, as they are not members of Varsity Sports.

=== Standings ===
2015 Varsity Football Log
Pos	Team	Pld	W	D	L	GF	GA	GD	Pts
1	WSU	1	1	0	0	3	2	+1	3
2	Wits	1	0	1	0	0	0	0	1
3	UWC	1	0	1	0	0	0	0	1
4	NMMU	1	0	1	0	0	0	0	1
5	VUT	1	0	1	0	0	0	0	1
6	TUT	0	0	0	0	0	0	0	0
7	Tuks	0	0	0	0	0	0	0	0
8	NWU	1	0	0	1	2	3	−1	0

Rules for classification: 3 points for a win, 1 point for a draw. The top 4 teams qualified for the Semi-Finals.

== Format ==
The tournament begins with a round robin stage, in which all teams play each other once. After the round robin stage, the top 4 teams will advance to the knock-out stage. The teams ranked 1 and 2 will host the semi-finals, against the teams ranked 4 and 3 respectively. The winners will advance to the final, to be hosted by the highest ranking finalist. All matches are played on Mondays. The league scoring system follows a standard scoring system and awards 3 points are awarded for a win, and 1 point for a draw. Teams are separated first on points, and then on goal difference.

== Round robin stage ==
The 2015 season began with the round robin stages on 20 July, which will end on 3 September.

- All times are South African (GMT+2)

=== Week 1 ===
20 July 2015	Wits	0-0	UWC	Johannesburg, Gauteng
17:00		Report		Stadium: Bidvest Stadium

20 July 2014	WSU	3-2	NWU Pukke	Mthatha, Eastern Cape
18:00	Mkhuseli Mfeketho (2), Siphesande Matoni	Report	Thabang Matlhoko, Patrick Lebitsa	Stadium: Mthatha Campus

20 July 2014	VUT	0-0	NMMU Madibaz	Vanderbijlpark, Gauteng
18:00		Report		Stadium: Isak Steyl Stadium

23 July 2014	TUT	0-0	UP-Tuks	Pretoria, Gauteng
18:30		Report		Stadium: TUT Stadium

=== Week 2 ===
27 July 2015	UWC	v	UP-Tuks	Bellville, Western Cape
17:00				Stadium: University of the Western Cape Stadium

27 July 2015	Wits	v	NMMU Madibaz	Johannesburg, Gauteng
18:00				Stadium: Bidvest Stadium

27 July 2014	TUT	v	WSU	Pretoria, Gauteng
18:00				Stadium: TUT Stadium

30 July 2015	VUT	v	NWU Pukke	Vanderbijlpark, Gauteng
18:30				Stadium: Isak Steyl Stadium

=== Week 3 ===
3 August 2015	UP-Tuks	v	NMMU Madibaz	Pretoria, Gauteng
17:00				Stadium: Tuks Stadium

3 August 2015	VUT	v	TUT	Vanderbijlpark, Gauteng
18:00				Stadium: Isak Steyl Stadium

3 August 2015	NWU Pukke	v	Wits	Potchefstroom, North West
18:00				Stadium: Fanie du Toit Sports Complex

6 August 2015	UWC	v	WSU	Bellville, Western Cape
18:30				Stadium: University of the Western Cape Stadium

== Knockout stage ==
The top four placed men's teams progressed to the knockout stage, as did all four women's teams. The semi-finals for both men and women were played on 10 September and the finals on 24 September.

== Sponsors ==
The tournament is sponsored by:

- Cell C
- Debonairs Pizza
- First National Bank
- Samsung
