= Wits University F.C. =

Wits University FC
- Full name: Wits University Football Club
- Ground: Bidvest Stadium, Johannesburg
- Capacity: 5,000
- Coach: Mark Haskins
- Website: wits-fc.co.za

Wits University Football Club, also known as Wits FC, is the football club representing the University of the Witwatersrand based in Johannesburg, South Africa.

Wits University Football Club has the largest number of members for any single sporting code in the university, with two men's teams, a ladies' teams, and a junior program for prospective students.

The Men's & Ladies' First Teams represent the university in the University Sports South Africa (USSA) Football Gauteng league, and are regular participants in the USSA Football National Club Championships competing with the top 16 university teams in the country, held in December of each year. The men's senior team, coached by Mark Haskins, is ranked 8th in the country following participation in the National Championships. The women's team, coached by Jabulile Baloyi, narrowly missed out on qualification. The women's team also occasionally participates in external tournaments, such as the annual Zodwa Khoza Cup.

The USSA Football National Club Championships act as the qualifiers to the prestigious Varsity Sports Football tournament of the following year; with the top eight men's teams and top four ladies' teams affiliated with Varsity Sports booking their place in the tournament.

The Men's First & Reserve Teams are members of SAFA Soweto, with the First Team playing in the Promotional League, playing towards promotion to the SAB Regional League.

== Stadium ==
Wits FC's home ground is the Milpark Stadium, located on the university's East Campus in Braamfontein, Johannesburg. The stadium can hold up to 5000 spectators at capacity. The stadium was primarily used by Premier Soccer League outfit, Bidvest Wits F.C., when it was 50% owned by Bidvest. Now the stadium is 100% owned by the university, since Bidvest sold the other 50% when it sold their shares.

== Honours and tournament history ==
=== Varsity Football record ===
- 2017 Varsity Football - 7th
- 2016 Varsity Football – 7th
- 2015 Varsity Football - Semi-final
- 2014 Varsity Football – did not qualify
- 2013 Varsity Football – 7th

=== USSA Football National Club Championships record ===
Men

- 2017 – 8th
- 2016 – 6th
- 2015 – 7th
- 2014 – 5th
- 2013 – Did not qualify
- 2012 – 5th
- 2011 – Did not qualify
- 2010 – Did not qualify
- 2009 – Did not qualify
