= Siboniso Gaxa =

South African footballer (born 1984)

Personal information
- Full name: Siboniso Gaxa
- Date of birth: 6 April 1984 (age 42)
- Place of birth: Durban, South Africa
- Height: 1.85 m (6 ft 1 in)
- Position: Right-back

Youth career
- Induna Lotz
- 2001–2002: NMMU

Senior career*
Years	Team	Apps	(Gls)
2002–2008	SuperSport United	131	(4)
2008–2010	Mamelodi Sundowns	45	(1)
2010–2012	Lierse	43	(0)
2012–2016	Kaizer Chiefs	87	(1)
2016–2017	Bidvest Wits	6	(0)
2018	Ajax Cape Town	2	(0)
Total		314	(6)

International career^{‡}
1998–2001	South Africa U17	1	(0)
2001–2004	South Africa U20	17	(0)
2005–2013	South Africa	57	(0)
- * Club domestic league appearances and goals as of 21 March 2018 ‡ National team caps and goals as of 21 March 2018

Siboniso "Pa" Gaxa (born 6 April 1984) is a South African former soccer player who played as a defender. He played for Ajax Cape Town, Kaizer Chiefs F.C., Mamelodi Sundowns F.C. and the South African national team.

== Personal ==
Gaxa hails from KwaMashu, Durban. He was given the nickname "Pa" because he was unusually mature as a child. He graduated from the University of the Witwatersrand with a degree in Political Science and Social Studies in 2019.

== Club career ==
Gaxa attended the University of Port Elizabeth, which at that time had a football team controlled by Danish side F.C. Copenhagen. However, he was not one of the three players, Elrio van Heerden, Lee Langeveldt and Bongumusa Mthethwa, who made it from the FCK-UPE Academy to F.C. Copenhagen. He is managed by ExtraTime S.L.

In 2002, he moved to Supersport United, where he stayed for six seasons, before joining Mamelodi Sundowns in 2008. In 2010, he moved to Belgian club Lierse. After the 2011–12 season, he was released by the team. On 15 May 2012 Gaxa signed a three-year contract for Kaizer Chiefs with the option to renew for one year. After 99 league appearances and 1 goal for Chiefs, he was released at the end of the 2015–16 season.

He signed a short-term contract with Bidvest Wits in November 2016, but was released by Bidvest Wits in October 2017 following the expiry of his deal in the summer.

Gaxa signed for Ajax Cape Town in February 2018. He retired later that year after leaving Ajax Cape Town.

== International career ==
Gaxa made his international debut in a 2006 FIFA World Cup qualifier against Cape Verde on 4 June 2005. He was part of South Africa's squad at the 2005 CONCACAF Gold Cup, 2006 African Cup of Nations, 2009 FIFA Confederations Cup, 2010 FIFA World Cup and 2013 African Cup of Nations.

== Honours ==
=== Supersport United ===
- MTN 8 – 2004
- Nedbank Cup – 2005
- Premier Soccer League – 2007/08

=== Kaizer Chiefs ===
- Premier Soccer League – 2012/13

Premier Soccer League – 2014/15

- Nedbank Cup – 2013
- Carling Black Label – 2013
- MTN 8 – 2014

=== Bidvest Wits ===
- Premier Soccer League – 2016/17
- MTN 8 – 2016
