= 2014 Varsity Football =

Varsity Football Challenge
- Season: 2014
- Champions: UP-Tuks (2nd Title)
- Matches: 31
- Biggest home win: 6-0 (NWU vs UCT), (UJ vs UCT)
- Biggest away win: 4-0 (UJ vs Tuks), (NMMU vs UFS)
- Highest scoring: 5-1 (Tuks vs UL), 6-0 (NWU vs UCT), (UJ vs UCT), 3-3 (UCT vs UWC)
- Longest unbeaten run: UJ (8 games)

The 2014 Varsity Football challenge is the second season of a South African university association football competition. It involves some of the top football playing universities in the country, which belong to the University Sports Company. The tournament is run by Varsity Sports SA, and is endorsed by the South African Football Association and University Sport South Africa.

== History ==
The Varsity Cup tournament was founded in 2008, featuring the rugby teams of eight universities. Varsity Sports was expanded in 2012 to include other sporting codes. University Sport South Africa discussed the Varsity Football proposal at its 2012 annual general meeting. The idea was initially rejected, as it was seen to split the member institutions. However, it was later accepted, and 2013 was the inaugural season of Varsity Football, with an 8 team men's tournament. A four team women's tournament is also being played.

== Participating teams ==
Location of teams in 2014 Varsity Football
Blue: Men's teams only; Red: Women's teams only; Green: Men's and Women's teams.

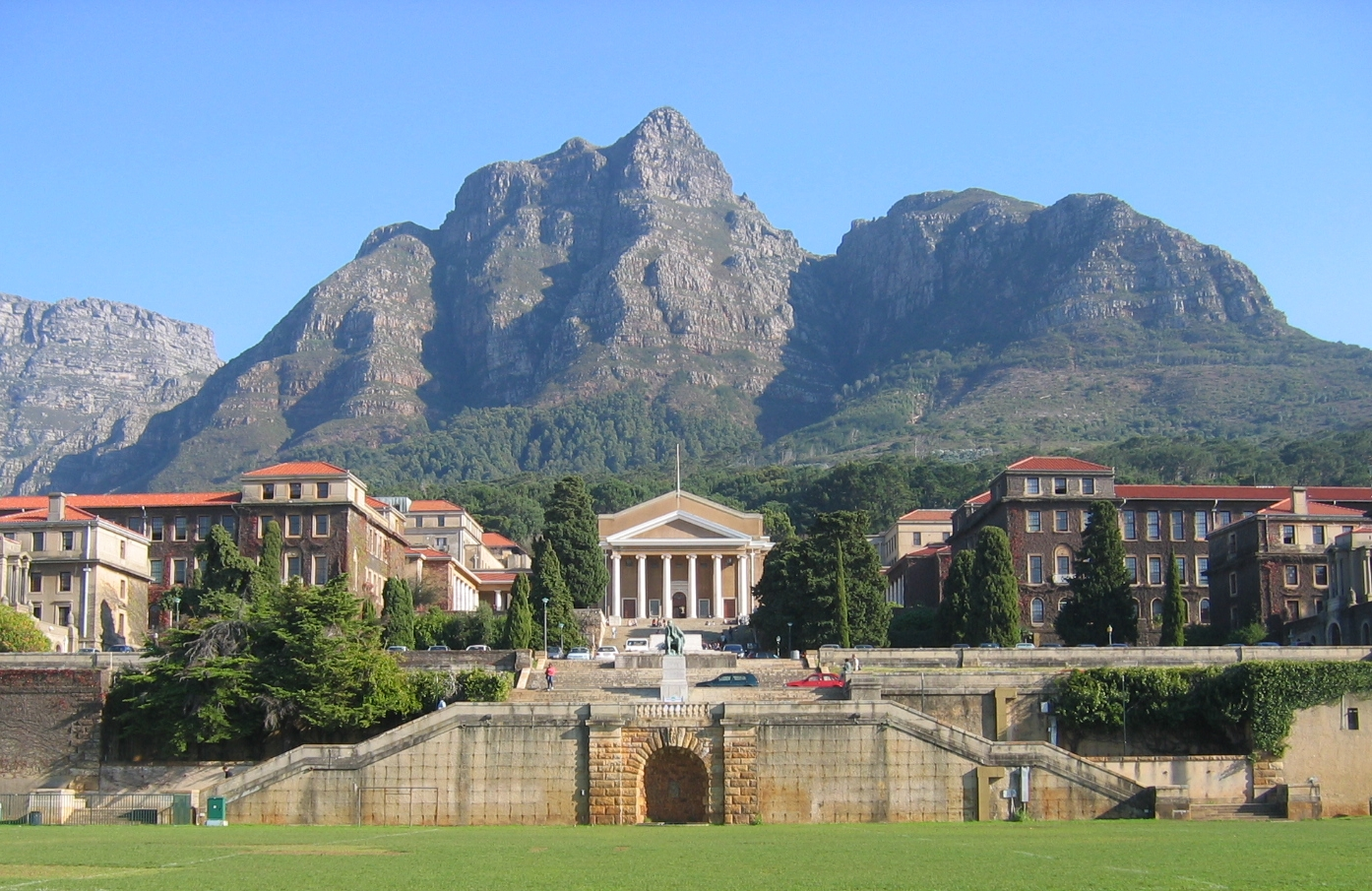
UCT is the oldest of the competing universities

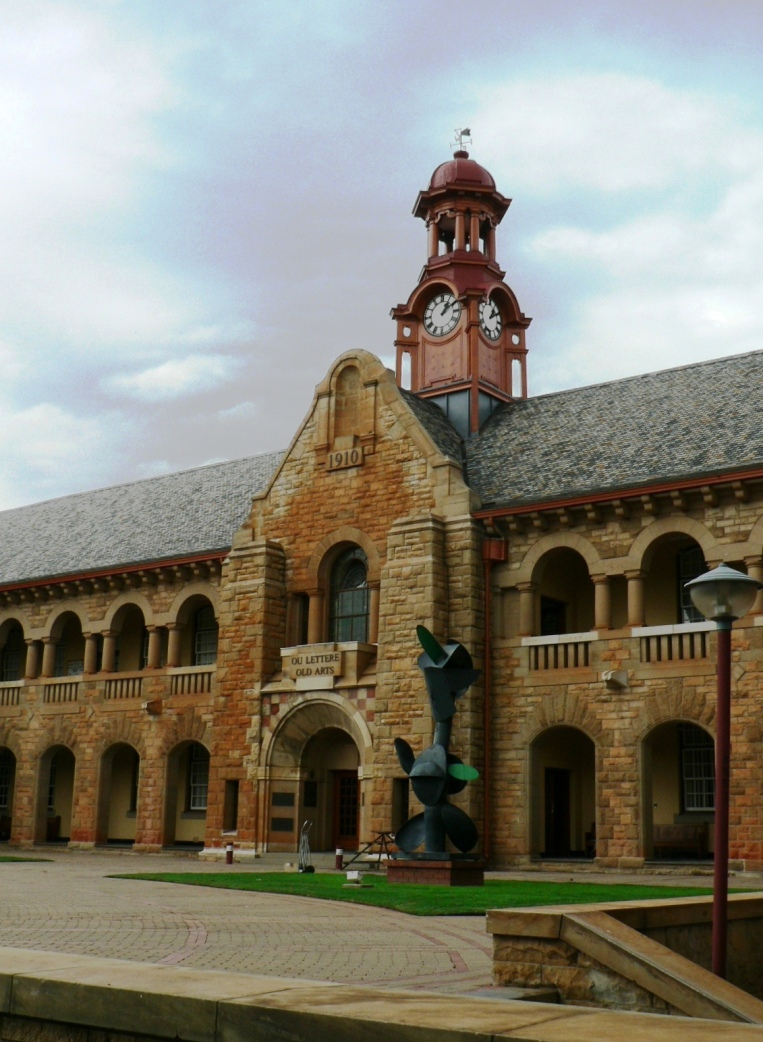
Tuks are the 2013 Varsity Sports men's football champions

The eight teams competing in the men's Varsity Football challenge are:

Varsity Football Challenge
Team Name	University	Stadium
NMMU Madibaz	Nelson Mandela Metropolitan University	NMMU Stadium
NWU Mafikeng	North-West University	Mafikeng Sports Fields
UCT Ikeys	University of Cape Town	The Green Mile
UFS Kovsies	University of the Free State	Shimla Park
UJ	University of Johannesburg	AW Muller Stadium; UJ Soweto Campus Sport Complex
Limpopo	University of Limpopo	Oscar Mphetha Stadium^{1}
UP-Tuks	University of Pretoria	Tuks Stadium
UWC	University of the Western Cape	UWC Sport Stadium

The four teams competing in the men's Varsity Football challenge are:

Varsity Football Challenge
Team Name	University	Stadium
UJ	University of Johannesburg	AW Muller Stadium
UP-Tuks	University of Pretoria	Tuks Stadium
TUT	Tshwane University of Technology	TUT Stadium
UWC	University of the Western Cape	UWC Sport Stadium

- ^{1} The University of Limpopo was unable to host any matches at Oscar Mphetha Stadium, as the stadium did not meet league standards. As such, the team played all of their matches away.

=== Qualification ===
Qualification was based on the 2013 University Sports South Africa National Club Championships. In order to qualify, men's teams need to be one of the eight highest placed teams associated with Varsity Sports.

=== Standings ===
2014 Varsity Football Log
Pos	Team	Pld	W	D	L	GF	GA	GD	Pts
1	UJ	7	3	4	0	19	6	+13	13
2	NWU	7	3	4	0	16	8	+8	13
3	Tuks	7	4	1	2	15	10	+5	13
4	UFS	7	3	2	2	9	9	0	11
5	NMMU	7	3	1	3	12	12	0	10
6	UWC	7	2	3	2	11	11	0	9
7	UL	7	0	3	4	6	16	−10	3
8	UCT	7	0	2	5	6	22	−16	2

Rules for classification: 3 points for a win, 1 point for a draw. The top 4 teams qualified for the Semi-Finals.

== Format ==
The tournament begins with a round robin stage, in which all teams play each other once. After the round robin stage, the top 4 teams will advance to the knock-out stage. The teams ranked 1 and 2 will host the semi-finals, against the teams ranked 4 and 3 respectively. The winners will advance to the final, to be hosted by the highest ranking finalist. All matches are played on Mondays. The league scoring system follows a standard scoring system and awards 3 points are awarded for a win, and 1 point for a draw. Teams are separated first on points, and then on goal difference.

== Round robin stage ==
The 2014 season began with the round robin stages on 21 July, which will end on 1 September.

- All times are South African (GMT+2)

=== Week 1 ===
21 July 2014	NMMU	2 - 2	NWU Mafikeng	Port Elizabeth, Eastern Cape
16:30	Kieran Koert 2	Report	Sandile Mbatha, Sifiso Ngwenya	Stadium: NMMU Stadium

21 July 2014	UWC	2 - 2	UJ	Bellville, Western Cape
18:00	Tapelo Sixishe, Wade Crowie	Report	Stephanis Sibanyoni, Wisdom Mathebula	Stadium: University of the Western Cape Stadium

21 July 2014	UCT	1 - 1	UL	Cape Town, Western Cape
18:00	Michael Salgado	Report	Tsietsi Tshehla	Stadium: Green Mile

21 July 2014	UP-Tuks	1 - 0	UFS	Pretoria, Gauteng
19:00	Lucky Mathosi	Report		Stadium: Tuks Stadium

=== Week 2 ===
28 July 2014	UFS	2 - 0	UL	Bloemfontein, Free State
16:45	Lehlohonolo Mokoena, Jay Jay Groenewald	Report		Stadium: Shimla Park

28 July 2014	UP-Tuks	2 - 1	UCT	Pretoria, Gauteng
18:00	Lucky Mathosi, Mbongeni Masilela	Report	Michael Salgado	Stadium: Tuks Stadium

28 July 2014	UJ	3 - 0	NMMU	Johannesburg, Gauteng
18:00	Tebogo Mandyu, Ponshu Nyathi 2	Report		Stadium: AW Muller Stadium

28 July 2014	NWU Mafikeng	1 - 0	UWC	Mahikeng, North West
19:00	Mogomotsi Molefe	Report		Stadium: Mafikeng Sports Fields

=== Week 3 ===
4 August 2014	UWC	1 - 2	UFS	Bellville, Western Cape
16:45	Curtley Beukes	Report	Dumisani Tjomelane, Manxubandile Bantshi	Stadium: University of the Western Cape Stadium

4 August 2014	NMMU	2 - 1	UCT	Port Elizabeth, Eastern Cape
18:00	Sachin Jackson, Kieran Koert	Report	Moussi Sopp	Stadium: NMMU Stadium

4 August 2014	NWU-Mafikeng	3 - 2	UL	Mahikeng, North West
18:00	Orebotse Mongae, Lebogang Phetlhu, Tshenolo Machwisa	Report	Clyde Kgatla, Mahlatse Mogale	Stadium: Mafikeng Sports Fields

4 August 2014	UP-Tuks	0 - 4	UJ	Pretoria, Gauteng
19:00	Matthew Edwards, Sandro Claro, Tebogo Mandyu, Ruben De Freitas	Report		Stadium: Tuks Stadium

=== Week 4 ===
11 August 2014	UP-Tuks	5 - 1	UL	Pretoria, Gauteng
16:45	Botshelo Mfulwane 2, Sibongile Njokwe, Lindsay Stowman, Jeremiah Nkwana	Report	Clyde Kgatla	Stadium: Tuks Stadium

11 August 2014	UFS	2 - 2	UJ	Bloemfontein, Free State
18:00	Lehlohonolo Mokoena, Manxubandile Bantshi	Report	Sandro Claro, Lwazi Nogenga	Stadium: Shimla Park

11 August 2014	NMMU	1 - 2	UWC	Port Elizabeth, Eastern Cape
18:00	Lukhanyo Rasmeni	Report	Tapelo Sixishe, Reza Dramat	Stadium: NMMU Stadium

11 August 2014	NWU-Mafikeng	6 - 0	UCT	Mahikeng, North West
19:00	Thatohatsi Santos, Tshenolo Machwisa 3, Matsobane Matsi, Kagiso Modimeong	Report		Stadium: Mafikeng Sports Fields

=== Week 5 ===
18 August 2014	UFS	0 - 4	NMMU	Bloemfontein, Free State
16:45		Report	Simamkele Thobi, Lukhanyo Rasmeni, Kieran Koert, Kurt Duff	Stadium: Shimla Park

18 August 2014	Tuks	2 - 2	NWU-Mafikeng	Pretoria, Gauteng
18:00	Mbongeni Masilela, Jeremiah Nkwana	Report	Lindani Dudula, Orebotse Mongae	Stadium: Tuks Stadium

18 August 2014	UWC	1 - 1	UL	Bellville, Western Cape
18:00	Curtley Beukes	Report	Theo Phophi	Stadium: University of the Western Cape Stadium

18 August 2014	UJ	6 - 0	UCT	Soweto, Gauteng
19:00	Pontsho Nyathi, Karl Clements, Ruben De Freitas, Sandro Claro, Lumkile Dava, Matthew Edwards	Report		Stadium: UJ Soweto Campus Sport Complex

=== Week 6 ===
25 August 2014	NWU-Mafikeng	1 - 1	UJ	Mahikeng, North West
16:45	Lindani Dudula	Report	Ruben De Freitas	Stadium: Mafikeng Sports Fields

25 August 2014	UCT	0 - 2	UFS	Cape Town, Western Cape
18:00		Report	Byron Donaldson (OG), Jay Jay Groenewald	Stadium: Green Mile

25 August 2014	UWC	2 - 1	UP_Tuks	Bellville, Western Cape
18:00	Tapelo Sixishe, Reza Dramat	Report	Jeremiah Nkwana	Stadium: University of the Western Cape Stadium

25 August 2014	NMMU	3 - 0	UL	Port Elizabeth, Eastern Cape
19:00	Kieran Koert, Onela Beqezi, Simamkele Thobi	Report		Stadium: NMMU Stadium

=== Week 7 ===
1 September 2014	UCT	3 - 3	UWC	Cape Town, Western Cape
16:45	Charlie Mbatha, Michael Salgado, Louis-Romain Moussi Sopp	Report	Curtley Beukes, Keenan Davis, Reza Dramat	Stadium: Green Mile

1 September 2014	UJ	1 - 1	UL	Johannesburg, Gauteng
18:00	Taelo Mphahlele (OG)	Report	Clyde Kgatla	Stadium: AW Muller Stadium

1 September 2014	UFS	1 - 1	NWU Mafikeng	Bloemfontein, Free State
18:00	Manxubandile Bantshi	Report	Kagiso Modimoeng	Stadium: Shimla Park

1 September 2014	UP-Tuks	4 - 0	NMMU	Pretoria, Gauteng
19:00	Jeremiah Nkwana, Simbongile Njokwe, Lundi Balfour (OG), Thabo Ndlovu	Report		Stadium: Tuks Stadium

== Knockout stage ==
The top four placed men's teams progressed to the knockout stage, as did all four women's teams. The semi-finals for both men and women were played on 8 September and the finals on 15 September.

=== Men's tournament ===
==== Semi-finals ====
8 September 2014	NWU Mafikeng	0(4) - (5)0	UP-Tuks	Mahikeng, North West
16:45		Report		Stadium: Mafikeng Sports Fields

8 September 2014	UJ	2 - 2	UFS	Soweto, Gauteng
19:00	Wisdom Mathebula, Kaylan More	Report	Walter Phori, Marathodi Phillies	Stadium: UJ Soweto Campus Sport Complex

==== Final ====
15 September 2014	UJ	0 - 1	UP-Tuks	Soweto, Gauteng
19:00		Report	Jeremiah Nkwana	Stadium: UJ Soweto Campus Sport Complex

=== Women's tournament ===
==== Semi-finals ====
8 September 2014	TUT	2 - 0	UWC	Mahikeng, North West
16:00		Report		Stadium: Mafikeng Sports Fields

8 September 2014	UJ	2 - 1	UP-Tuks	Soweto, Gauteng
16:00		Report		Stadium: UJ Soweto Campus Sport Complex

==== Final ====
15 September 2014	TUT	5 - 0	UP-Tuks	Soweto, Gauteng
16:00	Mary Ntsweng (2), Palesa Mohlabai, Katlego Khwinana (2)	Report		Stadium: UJ Soweto Campus Sport Complex

== Notable players and coaches ==
Players and coaches who have since been signed by professional clubs.

== Sponsors ==
The tournament is sponsored by:

- Cell C
- Debonairs Pizza
- First National Bank
- Samsung
