= 2013 Varsity Football =

Varsity Football Challenge
- Season: 2013
- Champions: UP-Tuks (men); University of Johannesburg (women)
- Matches: 34
- Goals: 99 (2.91 per match)
- Biggest home win: 5–0 (Tuks vs UCT), 6–1 (NWU vs UFS)
- Biggest away win: 4–0 (Tuks vs UFS), (NMMU vs UCT), (NWU vs Wits)
- Highest scoring: 6–1 (NWU vs UFS)

The 2013 Varsity Football challenge was the first season of a South African university association football competition. It involved some of the top football playing universities in the country, which belong to the University Sports Company. The tournament is run by Varsity Sports South Africa, and is endorsed by the South African Football Association and University Sport South Africa.

The men's competition was won by UP-Tuks and the women's competition by University of Johannesburg.

== History ==
The Varsity Cup tournament was founded in 2008, featuring the rugby teams of eight universities. Varsity Sports was expanded in 2012 to include other sporting codes. University Sport South Africa discussed the Varsity Football proposal at its 2012 annual general meeting. The idea was initially rejected, as it was seen to split the member institutions. However, it was later accepted, and 2013 was the inaugural season of Varsity Football, with an 8 team men's tournament. A four team women's tournament is also being played.

== Participating teams ==
Location of teams in 2013 Varsity Football
Blue: Men's teams only; Red: Women's teams only; Green: Men's and Women's teams.

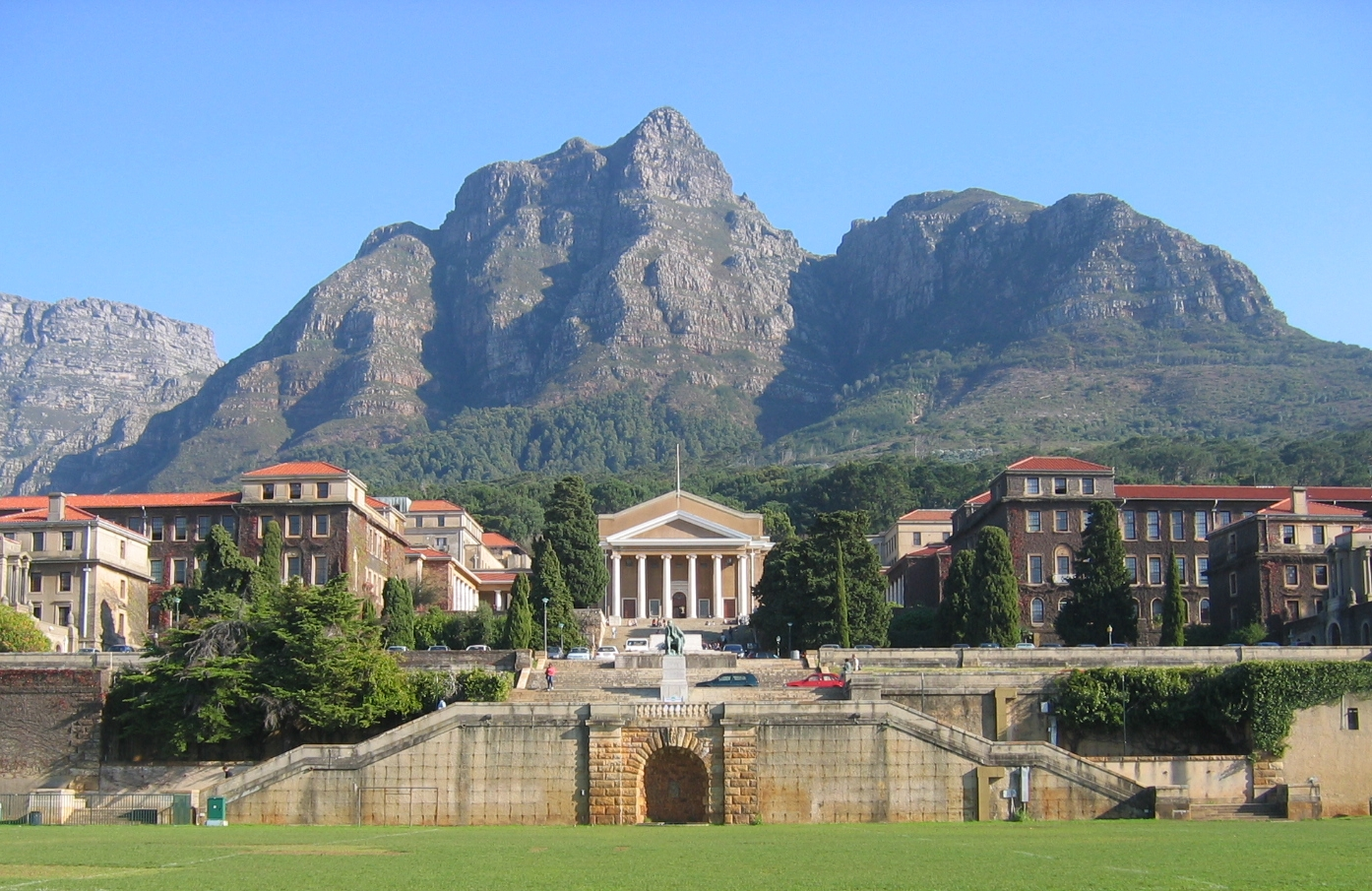
UCT is the oldest of the competing universities

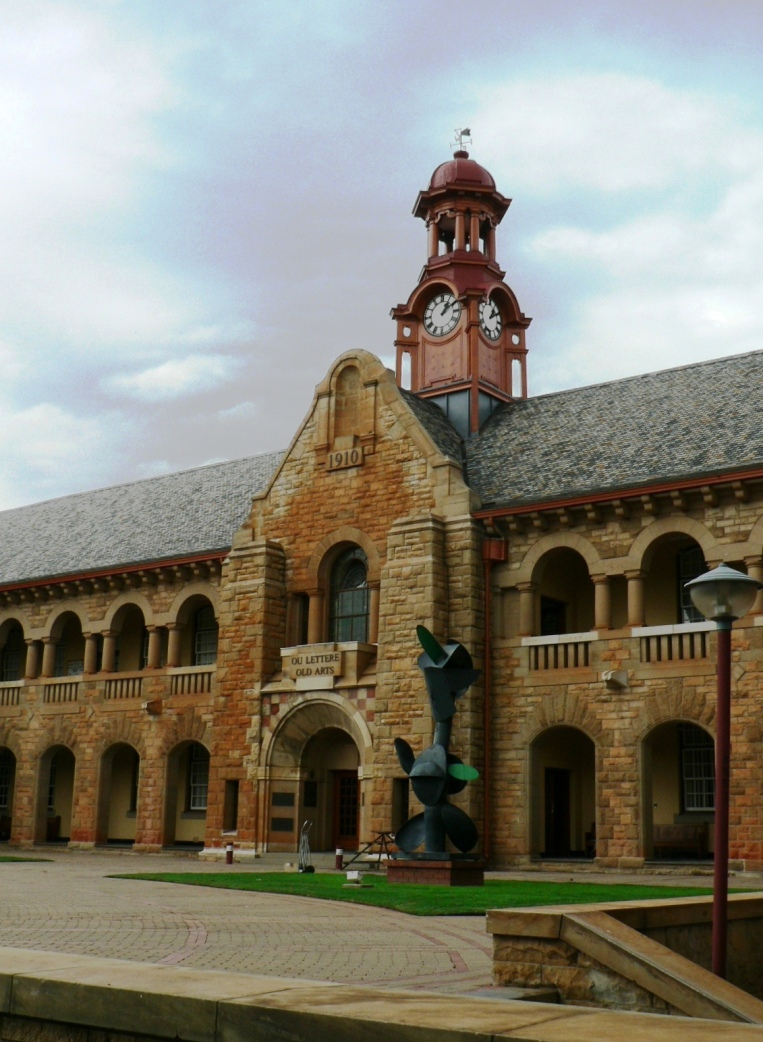
Tuks are the 2012 University Sport South Africa men's football champions

The eight teams competing in the men's Varsity Football challenge are:

Varsity Football Challenge
Team Name	University	Stadium
NMMU Madibaz	Nelson Mandela Metropolitan University	NMMU Stadium
NWU Mafikeng	North-West University	Mafikeng Sports Fields
TUT	Tshwane University of Technology	TUT Stadium
Ikey Warriors	University of Cape Town	The Green Mile
UFS Kovsies	University of the Free State	Shimla Park
UP-Tuks	University of Pretoria	Tuks Stadium
UWC	University of the Western Cape	UWC Sport Stadium
Wits	University of the Witwatersrand	Bidvest Stadium

The four teams competing in the women's Varsity Football challenge are:

Varsity Football Challenge
Team Name	University	Stadium
TUT	Tshwane University of Technology	TUT Stadium
UP-Tuks	University of Pretoria	Tuks Stadium
UJ	University of Johannesburg	AW Muller Stadium
Limpopo	University of Limpopo	Oscar Mphetha Stadium

=== Qualification ===
For both the men's and women's tournaments, qualification was based on the 2012 University Sports South Africa National Club Championships. In order to qualify, men's teams need to be one of the eight highest placed teams associated with Varsity Sports. Women's teams needed to be one of the semi-finalists, and also be associated with Varsity Sports.

For the men's tournament, UP-Tuks qualified as USSA champions, and NWU-Mafikeng as losing finalists. TUT-Pretoria qualified as a losing semi-finalist, while UKZN Pietermaritzburg, also a losing semi-finalist, was ineligible, not being linked to Varsity Sports. Wits and UWC qualified as losing quarter finalists, while WSU-Potsdam and CPUT, both of which also lost in the quarter-finals were ineligible. UCT, ranked 9th, UFS, ranked 11th and NMMU, ranked 14th were invited. Higher placed University of Venda, WSU-Ibika and UKZN-Edgewood were not invited, as they are not linked to Varsity Sports.

For the women's tournament, TUT-Pretoria was invited as the USSA women's champion. UP-Tuks qualified as the losing finalist, and UJ as a losing semi-finalist. VUT, a losing semi-finalist, was not invited, lacking affiliation with Varsity Sports at the time. As such, 5th ranked University of Limpopo was invited instead.

=== Standings ===
2013 Varsity Football Log
Pos	Team	Pld	W	D	L	GF	GA	GD	Pts
1	TUT	7	5	2	0	16	6	+10	17
2	UP-Tuks	7	5	1	1	15	5	+10	16
3	NWU Mafikeng	7	4	1	2	15	6	+9	13
4	NMMU Madibaz	7	3	4	0	15	6	+9	13
5	UFS Kovsies	7	1	4	2	7	14	−7	7
6	UWC	7	1	2	4	6	9	−3	5
7	Wits	7	1	0	6	2	17	−15	3
8	UCT	7	0	2	5	4	17	−13	2

Rules for classification: 3 points for a win, 1 point for a draw. The top 4 teams qualified for the semi-finals.

== Format ==
The tournament begins with a round robin stage, in which all teams play each other once. After the round robin stage, the top 4 teams will advance to the knockout stage. The teams ranked 1 and 2 will host the semi-finals, against the teams ranked 4 and 3 respectively. The winners will advance to the final, to be hosted by the highest ranking finalist. All matches are played on Mondays. The league scoring system follows a standard scoring system and awards 3 points are awarded for a win, and 1 point for a draw. Teams are separated first on points, and then on goal difference.

== Round robin stage ==
The 2013 season began with the round robin stages on 22 July, which will end on 2 September.

- All times are South African (GMT+2)

=== Week 1 ===
22 July 2013	Wits	0–4	NWU	Johannesburg, Gauteng
16:30 UTC+2	Thabo Mnyamane 2, Sandile Mbatha, Sylvester Moses	Report		Stadium: Bidvest Stadium

22 July 2013	UWC	0–2	NMMU	Cape Town, Western Cape
19:00 UTC+2		Report	Niven Kops, Leroy van Rensburg	Stadium: University of the Western Cape Stadium

22 July 2013	Tuks	1–4	TUT	Pretoria, Gauteng
19:00 UTC+2	Kabelo Ramongane	Report	Botshelo Mfulwane 2, Katlego Mokoena, Sizwe Khumalo	Stadium: Tuks Stadium

22 July 2013	UFS	1–1	UCT	Bloemfontein, Free State
19:00 UTC+2	Unathi Mabandla	Report	Wisy Namaseb	Stadium: Shimla Park

=== Week 2 ===
29 July 2013	Tuks	2–0	Wits	Pretoria, Gauteng
16:30 UTC+2	Mosa Sesele, Nelson Mwale (own goal)	Report		Stadium: Tuks Stadium

29 July 2013	UCT	0–4	NMMU	Cape Town, Western Cape
19:00 UTC+2		Report	Cloudius Sagandira 3, Leroy van Rensburg	Stadium: The Green Mile

29 July 2013	UWC	1–2	TUT	Cape Town, Western Cape
19:00 UTC+2	Curtley Beukes	Report	Andrew Mashigo, Doctor Radebe	Stadium: University of the Western Cape Stadium

29 July 2013	NWU	6–1	UFS	Mahikeng, North West
19:00 UTC+2	Thabo Mnyamane 3, Sylvester Moses, Otlaarongwa Rantese, Ryan van der Westhuizen	Report	Thato Skaut	Stadium: Mafikeng Sports Fields

=== Week 3 ===
5 August 2013	UFS	1–1	UWC	Bloemfontein, Free State
16:30 UTC+2	Tshepo Sefatsa	Report	Lulama Lolwana	Stadium: Shimla Park

5 August 2013	Tuks	1–1	NMMU	Pretoria, Gauteng
19:00 UTC+2	Lindsay Stowman	Report	Mbongeni Masilela	Stadium: Tuks Stadium ^{1}

5 August 2013	TUT	1–0	NWU	Pretoria, Gauteng
19:00 UTC+2	Khuliso Rashamuse	Report		Stadium: TUT Stadium

5 August 2013	UCT	0–1	Wits	Cape Town, Western Cape
19:00 UTC+2		Report	Neo Makua	Stadium: The Green Mile

=== Week 4 ===
12 August 2013	NWU	1–1	NMMU	Mahikeng, North West
16:30 UTC+2	Otlaarongwa Rantese	Report	Kieran Koert	Stadium: Mafikeng Sports Fields

12 August 2013	Wits	0–2	UWC	Johannesburg, Gauteng
19:00 UTC+2		Report	Curtley Beukes, Robbin Swartz	Stadium: Bidvest Stadium

12 August 2013	Tuks	5–0	UCT	Pretoria, Gauteng
19:00 UTC+2	Desmond Khuzwayo, Dean Wilkinson, Mbongeni Masilela, Keegan Boulle (2)	Report		Stadium: Tuks Stadium

12 August 2013	TUT	1–1	UFS	Pretoria, Gauteng
19:00 UTC+2	Botshelo Mfulwane	Report	Lehlohonolo Ramolebo	Stadium: TUT Stadium

=== Week 5 ===
19 August 2013	TUT	3–1	UCT	Pretoria, Gauteng
16:30 UTC+2	Themba Nkosi, Khomotso Selemela, Selby Madibana	Report	Lwazi Maziya	Stadium: TUT Stadium

19 August 2013	NWU	2–1	UWC	Mahikeng, North West
19:00 UTC+2	Sylvester Moses, Tshenolo Machwisa	Report	Curtley Beukes	Stadium: Mafikeng Sports Fields

19 August 2013	UFS	0–4	Tuks	Bloemfontein, Free State
19:00 UTC+2		Report	Mosa Sesele, Mbongeni Masilela, Claudio Barreiro, Thabo Ndlovu	Stadium: Shimla Park

19 August 2013	NMMU	4–1	Wits	Port Elizabeth, Eastern Cape
19:00 UTC+2	Leroy van Rensburg (2), Lindsay Stowman, Cornelius Matuoane	Report	Tshepo Motsukunyane	Stadium: NMMU A Soccer Field ^{1}

=== Week 6 ===
26 August 2013	TUT	2–2	NMMU	Pretoria, Gauteng
16:30 UTC+2	Botshelo Mfulwane, Sonwabiso Busakwe	Report	Leroy van Rensburg, Niven Kops	Stadium: TUT Stadium

26 August 2013	NWU	2–1	UCT	Mahikeng, North West
19:00 UTC+2	Thabo Mnyamane (2)	Report	Thami Mehlo	Stadium: Mafikeng Sports Fields

26 August 2013	Wits	0–2	UFS	Johannesburg, Gauteng
19:00 UTC+2				Stadium: Bidvest Stadium

26 August 2013	Tuks	1–0	UWC	Pretoria, Gauteng
19:00 UTC+2	Sphelele Khuzwayo	Report		Stadium: Tuks Stadium

=== Week 7 ===
2 September 2013	UWC	1–1	UCT	Cape Town, Western Cape
16:30 UTC+2	Tapelo Sixishe	Report	Velaphi Vilakazi	Stadium: University of the Western Cape Stadium

2 September 2013	TUT	3–0	Wits	Pretoria, Gauteng
19:00 UTC+2	Botshelo Mfulwane, Selby Madibana, Andrew Mashigo	Report		Stadium: TUT Stadium

2 September 2013	NWU	0–1	Tuks	Mahikeng, North West
19:30 UTC+2^{2}	Lawrence Ntswane	Report		Stadium: Mafikeng Sports Fields

2 September 2013	NMMU	1–1	UFS	Port Elizabeth, Eastern Cape
19:00 UTC+2	Lukhanyo Rasmeni	Report	JJ Groenewald	Stadium: NMMU A Soccer Field ^{1}

- ^{1} Matches originally scheduled for NMMU Stadium.
- ^{2} Kick off delayed due to late arrival of officials.

== Knockout stage ==
The top four placed men's teams progressed to the knockout stage, as did all four women's teams. The semi-finals for both men and women were played on 9 September and the finals on 16 September.

=== Men's tournament ===
==== Semi-finals ====
9 September 2013	Tuks	1–0	NWU	Pretoria, Gauteng
16:30 UTC+2		Report	Lebogang Phetlhu (own goal)	Stadium: Tuks Stadium

9 September 2013	TUT	0–1	NMMU	Pretoria, Gauteng
19:00 UTC+2		Report	Lukhanyo Rasmeni	Stadium: TUT Stadium

==== Final ====
16 September 2013	Tuks	4–1	NMMU	Pretoria, Gauteng
19:30 UTC+2	Lawrence Ntswane, Claudio Barreiro, Mbongeni Masilela (2)	Report	Bradley Peterson	Stadium: Tuks Stadium

=== Women's tournament ===
==== Semi-finals ====
9 September 2013	Tuks	0–2	UJ	Pretoria, Gauteng
14:00 UTC+2		Report		Stadium: Tuks Stadium

9 September 2013	TUT	4–0	Limpopo	Pretoria, Gauteng
16:30 UTC+2		Report		Stadium: TUT Stadium

==== Final ====
16 September 2013	TUT	0–6	UJ	Pretoria, Gauteng
16:30 UTC+2		Report	Disebo Mametja (2), Amanda Dlamini, Presocious Matabologa, Noko Matlou (2)	Stadium: Tuks Stadium

== Notable players and coaches ==
Players and coaches who have since been signed by professional clubs.

- Thabo Mnyamane (University of Pretoria), South African Premier Division

== Sponsors ==
The tournament is sponsored by:

- Cell C
- Debonairs Pizza
- First National Bank
- Samsung
