= Varsity Football (disambiguation) =

Varsity Football is a term for Football played at Universities.

Depending on geography it refers to different forms of football, American football in the US and Association football elsewhere such as Varsity Football (South Africa) in South Africa
