= University of Cape Town F.C. =

UCT FC
- Full name: University of Cape Town Football Club
- Nickname: Ikey Warriors
- Ground: UCT Kopano Astroturf, Rosebank, Cape Town
- Capacity: 500
- Chairman: Peter King
- Coach: Divian Adams (men); Ahmed Parker (women)
- League: University Sports South Africa (USSA) Football National Club Championships
Home colours	Away colours

University of Cape Town Football Club, also known as UCT FC, is the football club representing the University of Cape Town based in Cape Town, South Africa.

The University of Cape Town Football Club boasts 250 student members with three men's teams and three women's teams.

The Men's & Women's First Teams represent the university in the University Sports South Africa (USSA) Football National Club Championships competing with the top 20 university teams in the country, held in December of each year.

The USSA Football National Club Championships act as the qualifiers to the prestigious Varsity Sports Football tournament of the following year; with the top eight men's and women's teams affiliated with Varsity Sports booking their place in the tournament.

The club is an affiliate member of the Cape Town Tygerberg Football Association (CTTFA), with Men's First & Second Teams playing in the 1st Division having recently joined the association in 2016. The Women's First Team plays in the Sasol Women's League, after being crowned SAFA Cape Town Regional Women's League champions in 2017 and winning promotion playoffs. Whilst the Women's Second Team plays in the CTTFA Ladies' League. The Men's Third & Fourth Teams play in the university's Internal Soccer League, boasting 50 teams, all students of UCT.

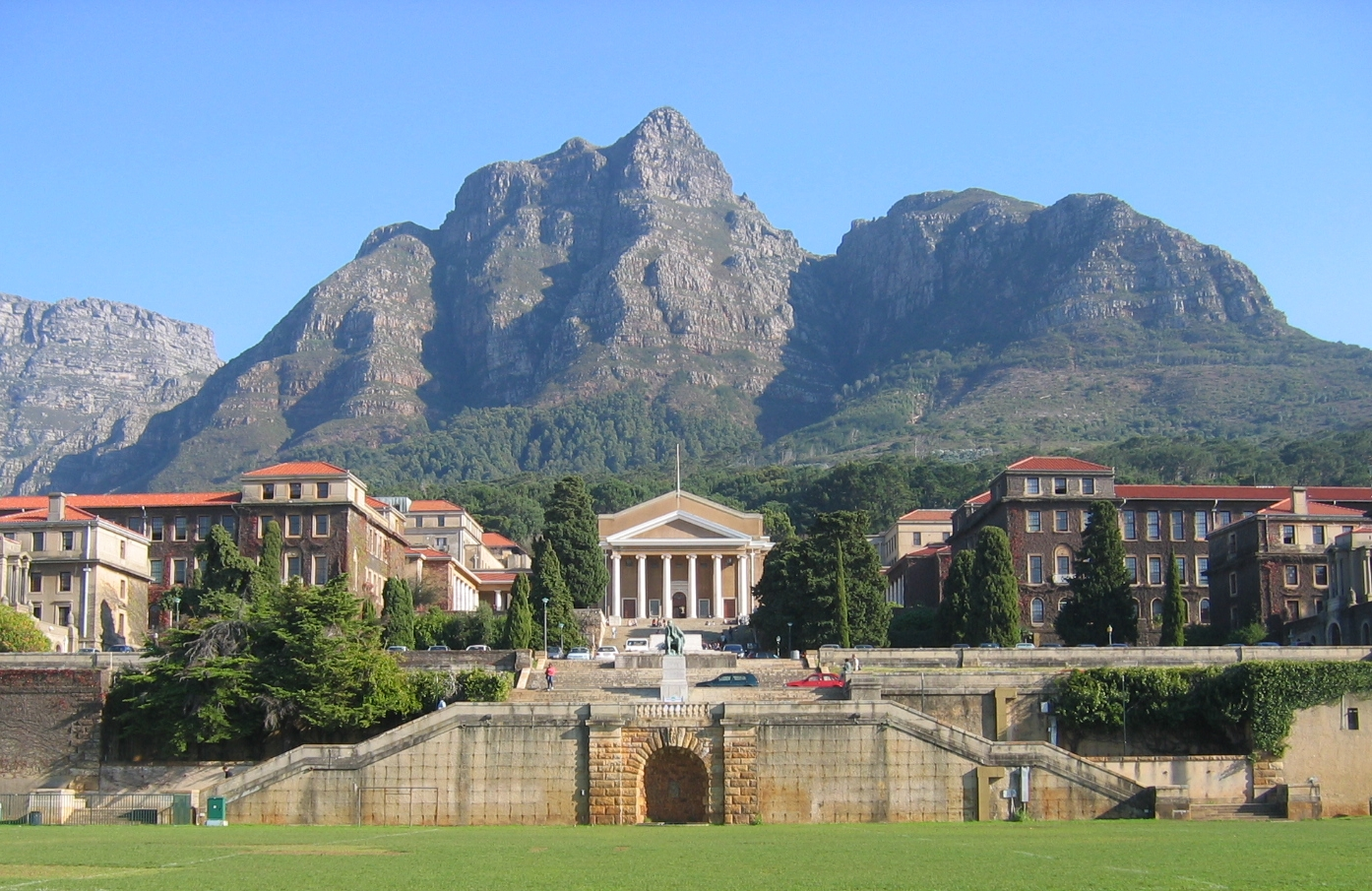
UCT Upper Campus

== Crests & Colours ==
The club plays with the University of Cape Town Coat of Arms on the left breast of the playing jersey and the UCT Sport logo on the right. The UCT crest was designed in 1859 by Charles Davidson Bell, Surveyor-General of the Cape Colony at the time. Bell was an accomplished artist who also designed medals and the triangular Cape stamp.

UCT FC uses the UCT Sport colour palette, with three primary colours: navy blue, sky blue and white. The home kit is traditionally navy blue, while the away strip is predominantly white with sky blue detailing.

== Nickname ==
The nickname "Ikey Warriors" was coined by 2014 Head Coach Rowan Hendricks and Ikey Tigers coach Kevin Musikanth during the 2014 Varsity Football season, due to the team's tenacious warrior-like spirit, tough tackling and never-say-die attitude. It was a nickname used only within the squad, but the media caught onto the name during the tournament, with Soccer Laduma among others writing about UCT's "Ikey Warriors". The name became popular among the club and its fans and has since grown into the club's official nickname.

For the first time, in 2015, the Ikey Warriors emblem was placed on the back of the playing jersey below the collar.

== Stadium ==
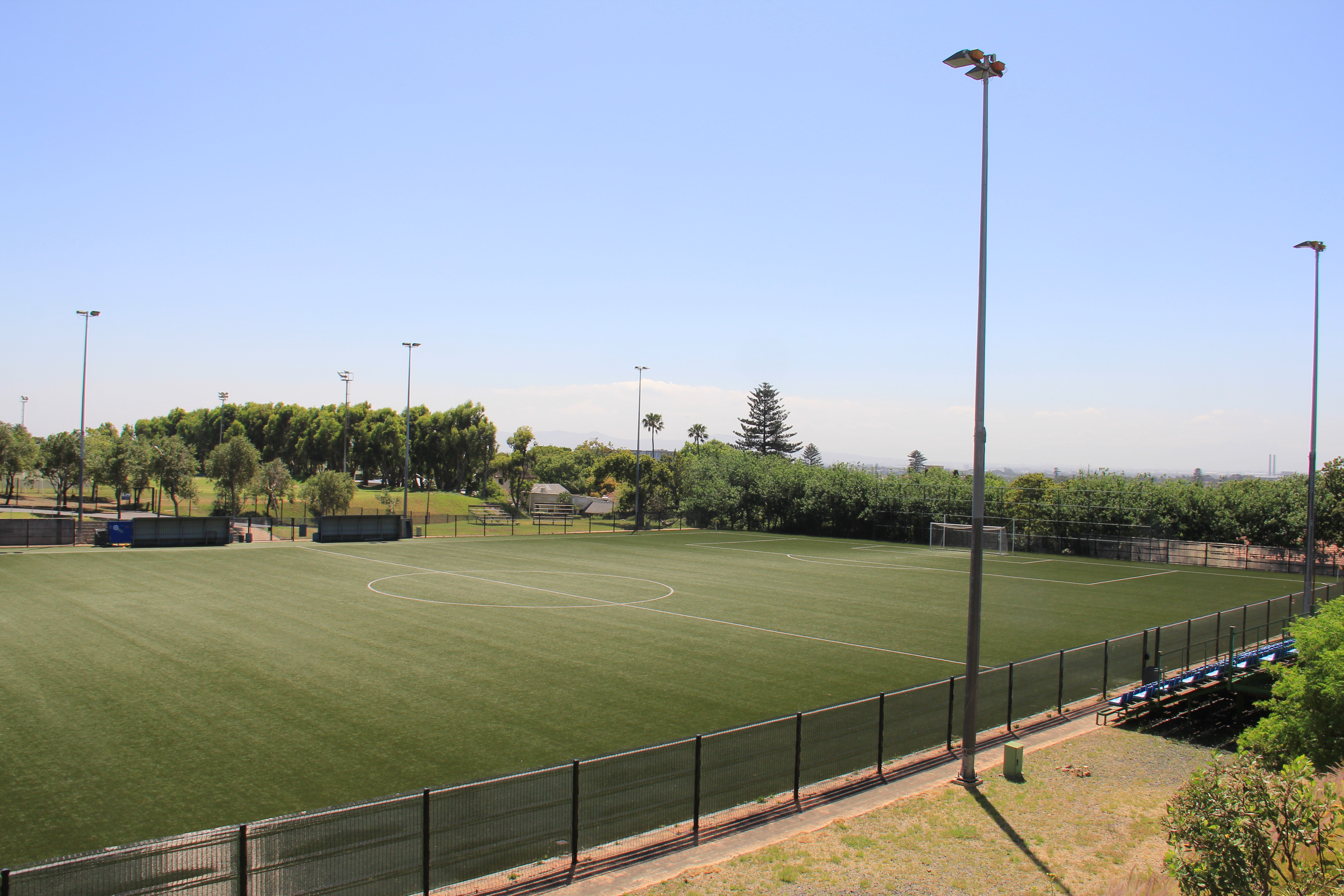
Kopano Astroturf, Lower Campus in Rosebank, Cape Town

UCT's home ground is the Kopano Astroturf, located on UCT's Lower Campus in Rosebank, Cape Town. The stadium can hold up to 500 spectators at capacity. The astroturf is FIFA approved, and was put on standby as a training facility during the 2010 FIFA World Cup due to its ability to withstand wet weather conditions. The astroturf was returfed in July 2018.

The University of Cape Town were host to the 2018 Western Cape Intervarsity Tournament. Kopano Astroturf was used for the football fixtures held on Saturday, 28 September, UCT competing with The University of the Western Cape and Stellenbosch University (Maties).

Clubs such as Hellenic and ASD Cape Town have used the Kopano Astroturf as their home ground in the ABC Motsepe League in the past.

During the 2013 and 2014 Varsity Football tournaments, UCT played their home games on the Groote Schuur Rugby Field, due to its ability to hold a larger number of spectators.

== Honours & Tournament History ==
=== Varsity Football record ===
Men

- 2014 Varsity Football – 8th
- 2013 Varsity Football – 8th

Women

- 2017 Varsity Football – Semi-finalists 4th
- 2016 Varsity Football – Semi-finalists 4th

=== USSA Football National Club Championships record ===
Men

- 2018 – Finished 3rd in group stages
- 2017 – 12th
- 2016 – 13th
- 2015 – Tournament cancelled due to #FeesMustFall protests
- 2014 – Did not qualify
- 2013 – 6th
- 2012 – 9th
- 2011 – Did not qualify
- 2010 – Did not qualify
- 2009 – Did not qualify

Women

- 2018 – Section B Winners
- 2017 – Relegated from Section A
- 2016 – 8th
- 2015 – Tournament cancelled due to #FeesMustFall protests
- 2014 – 13th
- 2013 – 16th
- 2012 – 15th
- 2011 – 12th
- 2010 – Did not qualify
- 2009 – 8th

== Club officials ==
=== Coaching staff ===
Men's Technical Team

- Head Coach: (South Africa) Jaydon Terblanche
- Assistant Coach & 2nd Team Coach: (South Africa) Angelo Julius
- Goalkeeper Coach: (South Africa) Mark Kapman
- Men's 3rd Team Coach: (South Africa) Storm Johnson
- Men's 4th Team Coach: (South Africa) Lindokuhle Skosana and Keenen Christon

Women's Technical Team

- Head Coach: (South Africa) Kamaal Sait
- Assistant Coach & 2nd Team Coach: (South Africa) Ahmed Parker
- Goalkeeper Coach: (South Africa) Mark Kapman

=== Committee ===
- Chairperson: Storm Johnson
- Vice-Chairperson: Lwazi Ncanana
- Secretary General:
- Treasurer:
- League Coordinator: Nadeem August
- Kit & Equipment Manager: Nhlamuselo Ngoveni
- Marketing Managers: Lindokuhle Skosana and Kawthar Gierdien
- Events Manager: Vincent Mofokeng
- Transformation and Outreach: Kateko Boitumelo Pule

== Kit manufacturer ==
- Kit manufacturer: Laurus

== Former Coaches & Chairpersons ==
=== Former Head Coaches ===
- (South Africa) Cayl Coetsee – 2016 (interim)
- (South Africa) Vorgen Less – 2015-2016
- (South Africa) Rowan Hendricks – 2014
- (South Africa) Monwabisi Ralarala – 2012-2013
- (England) Liam Shirley – 2012

=== Former Chairpersons ===
- (South Africa) Kateko Boitumelo Pule;– 2017
- (South Africa) Ammar Canani;– 2017
- (South Africa) Warren Black;– 2016
- (South Africa) Daniel Perling – 2014-2016
- (South Africa) Fairouz West – 2013
- (South Africa) Dustin Holohan – 2011-2013
