= NMMU F.C. =

NMMU FC
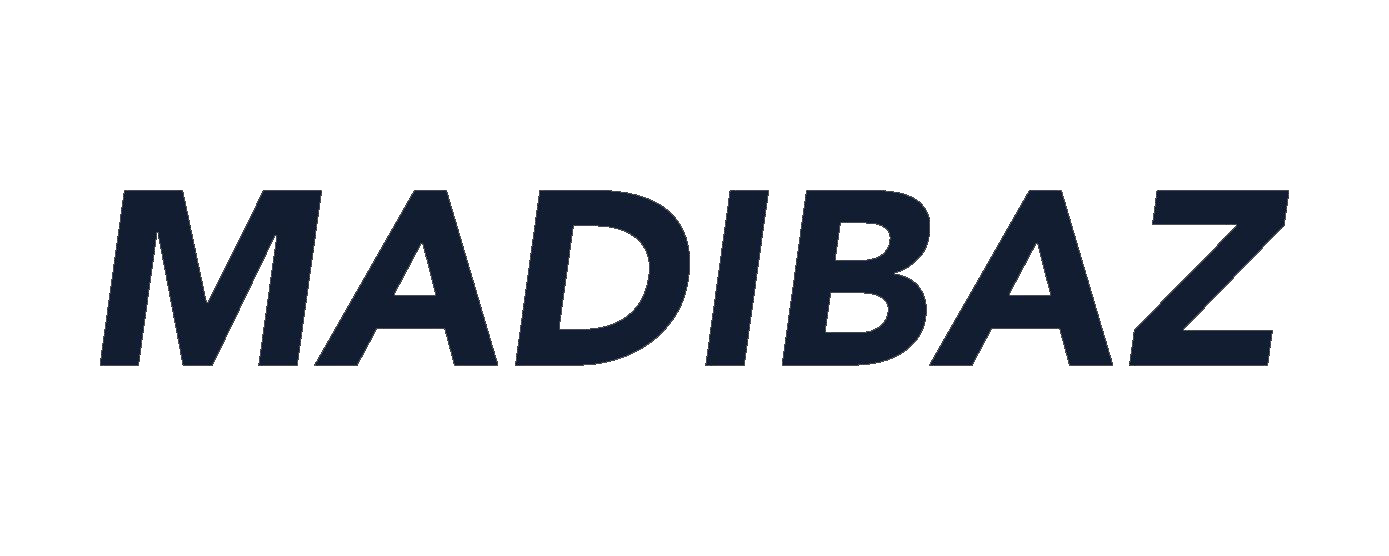
- Full name: Nelson Mandela Metropolitan University Football Club
- Nickname(s): Madibaz
- Founded: 2000 (as school of excellence); 2005 (as NMMU)
- Ground: NMMU Stadium
- Capacity: 15,000
- Owner: Nelson Mandela Metropolitan University
- Chairman: Kagiso Tsiane
- Manager: Mark Tommy
- League: Port Elizabeth Football Association Premier Division
- 2012: 5th
- Website: http://soccer.mandela.ac.za/

Nelson Mandela Metropolitan University F.C. is an association football club representing the Nelson Mandela Metropolitan University in Port Elizabeth, South Africa. The club was brought to its current form in 2005, through mergers of three football clubs. NMMU's previous institutions had football clubs at the University of Port Elizabeth, Port Elizabeth Technikon and Vista University's Port Elizabeth.

The school of excellence was founded in 2000 at UPE for FC Copenhagen. In 2003–04 the club won the Eastern Cape provincial league. PE Tech had previously run a professional club, which played in the National First Division in 2000–01 season. In 2006, the UPE franchise was sold to Bay United and became known as Bay Academy.

In 2011, the men's team won the University Sport South Africa championship, with a 3–0 win over Cape Peninsula University of Technology at the University of Limpopo.

During the 2013 season, the club has 3 senior men's teams and 1 senior women's team. The men's teams play in the Port Elizabeth Football Association's (PEFA) premier league, premier reserve league, and 2nd division. The women's team plays in the PEFA women's league.

== Honours ==
- 2000–01 Vodacom League, Eastern Cape: 1st (as Port Elizabeth Technikon)
- 2000–01 Vodacom League Coastal Stream: Promoted to the National First Division (as Port Elizabeth Technikon)
- 2002–03 Vodacom League, Eastern cape: 1st (as University of Port Elizabeth)
- 2010 University Sport South Africa Eastern Cape: 1st
- 2011 University Sports South Africa men's football tournament: 1st

== Results ==
Season finishing places for the premier men's team

- 2001–02 National First Division Coastal Stream: 9th (as Port Elizabeth Technikon)
- 2002–03 National First Division Coastal Stream: 14th(relegated) (as Port Elizabeth Technikon)
- 2005–06 Vodacom League Eastern Cape: 9th
- 2005–06 Vodacom League Eastern Cape: 14th (as Port Elizabeth Technikon)
- 2006–07 Vodacom League Eastern Cape: unknown
- 2007–08 Vodacom League Eastern Cape: unknown
- 2008–09 Vodacom League Eastern Cape: 14th
- 2009 Port Elizabeth Football Association Premier Division: 6th
- 2009 Port Elizabeth Football Association Premier Division: 2nd (as NMMU Missionvale)
- 2010 Port Elizabeth Football Association Premier Division: 2nd
- 2010 Port Elizabeth Football Association Premier Division: 3rd (as NMMU Missionvale)
- 2010 University Sport South Africa Eastern Cape: 1st
- 2010 University Sport South Africa National Tournament: 10th
- 2011 Port Elizabeth Football Association Premier Division: 2nd
- 2011 Port Elizabeth Football Association Premier Division: 6th (as NMMU Missionvale)
- 2011 University Sport South Africa National Tournament: 1st
- 2012 Port Elizabeth Football Association Premier Division: 5th
- 2012 University Sport South Africa National Tournament: 12th
- 2013 Varsity Football: 2nd
- 2013 Port Elizabeth Football Association Premier Division: 3rd
- 2013 University Sport South Africa National Tournament: 5th
- 2014 Varsity Football: 5th
- 2014 Port Elizabeth Football Association Premier Division: 1st
- 2014 University Sport South Africa National Tournament: 5th

== Club officials ==
- Chairman: Kagiso Tsiane
- Vice-chairman: Nomzamo Maheneza
- Secretary: Nasreen Astrie
- Treasurer: Siseko Mazwi

== Technical team ==
- Manager: Mark Tommy
- Men's coach: Lukhanya Wasa
- Women's coach: Douleen Whitebooi

== Notable players ==
The following former NMMU players have represented South Africa:

- Kermit Erasmus
- Elrio van Heerden
- Siboniso Gaxa
- Lee Langeveldt

In addition the following former NMMU players have played professional football:

- Niven Kops
- Siyabulela Songwiqi

== Former coaches ==
- (Denmark) Roald Poulsen (2000–2004)

== Previous names ==
- 2000 University of Port Elizabeth (UPE-FCK)
- 2004 Nelson Mandela Metropolitan University (NMMU-FCK)

== Sponsors ==
- Shirt sponsor: ABSA
- Kit manufacturer: PUMA
- Previous club sponsor: PUMA
