= Lee Langeveldt =

South African footballer

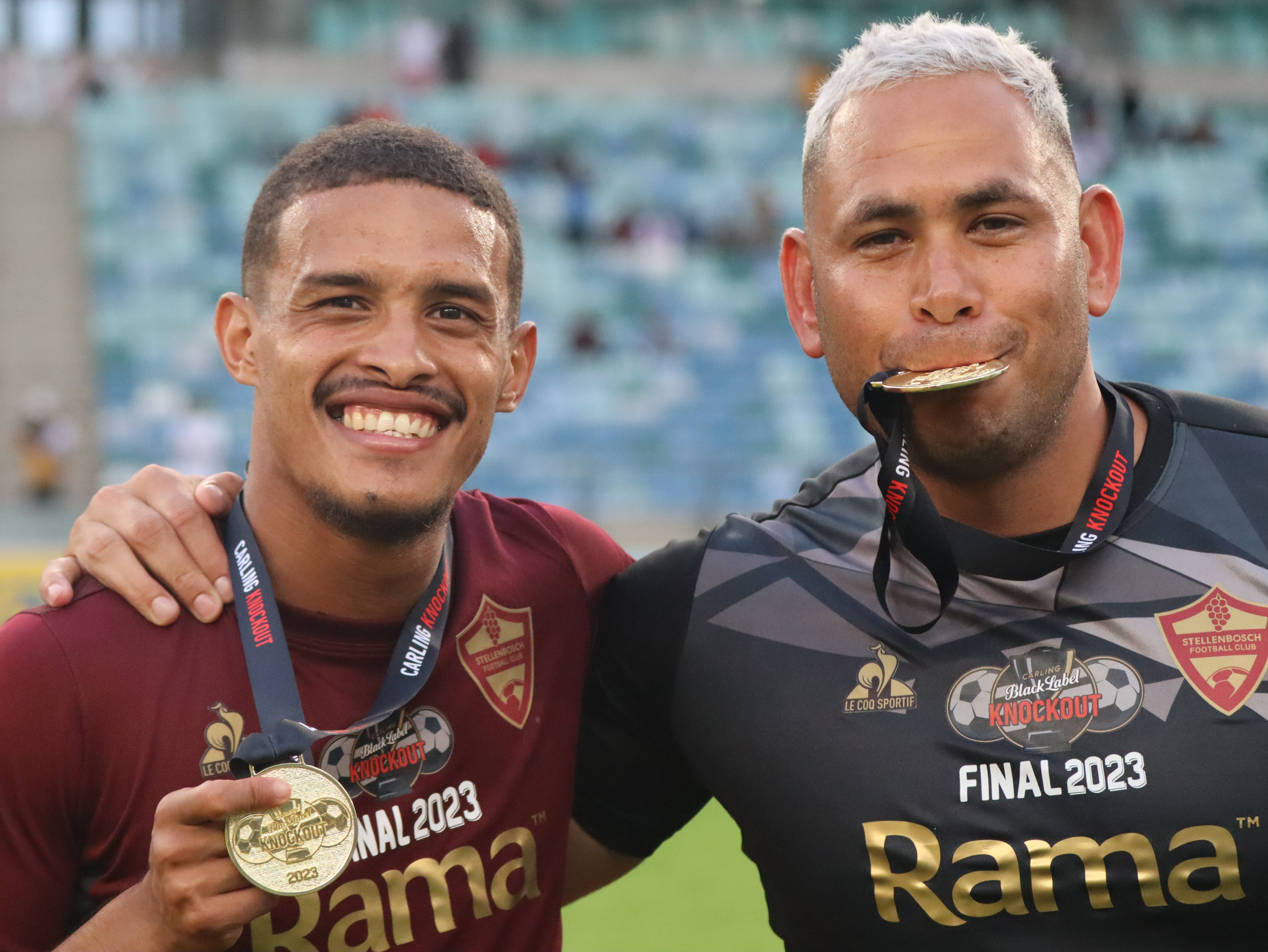
- Devin Titus (left) and Langeveldt (right)

Personal information
- Full name: Lee-Raoul Langeveldt
- Date of birth: 10 November 1986 (age 40)
- Place of birth: Stellenbosch, Western Cape, South Africa
- Height: 1.80 m (5 ft 11 in)
- Position: Goalkeeper

Team information
- Current team: Stellenbosch
- Number: 35

Youth career
- Idas Valley
- UPE-FCK

Senior career*
Years	Team	Apps	(Gls)
2005–2007	FC Fortune		
2007	KB		
2007–2014	Santos		
2014–2016	Milano United	52	(0)
2016–2017	Golden Arrows	0	(0)
2017–	Stellenbosch	73	(0)
- * Club domestic league appearances and goals as of 1 July 2024

Lee Langeveldt (born 10 November 1986) is a South African association footballer who plays for National First Division club Stellenbosch.

== Career ==
Langeveldt is a goalkeeper and began his career at South African club Idas Valley. He was a product of the former football school in South Africa, UPE-FCK at University of Port Elizabeth. He left the football school heading to FC Fortune, which in turn sent him to the Danish club F.C. Copenhagen's second team Kjøbenhavns Boldklub. In August 2007 he signed for South African football club Santos.

In July 2025, Langeveldt signed a contract extension with Stellenbosch, where he will also transition into a backroom role as goalkeeper coach for the club's youth teams and Stellenbosch Women's F.C.

== International ==
He was selected for the South African squad at the 2005 CONCACAF Gold Cup.
