= University of Port Elizabeth =

University in South Africa

Coordinates: 34.008416°S 25.670586°E

- Universiteit van Port Elizabeth iNyuvesi yaseBhayi
- Other names: UPE
- Former names: Port Elizabeth Art School
- Motto: Nulli cessura fides (Latin)
- Motto in English: Unyielding Faith
- Type: Public University
- Active: 1964–2004
- Academic affiliations: AAU; ACU; HESA
- Location: Port Elizabeth, South Africa
- Campus: Urban and suburban
- Language: English and Afrikaans
- Colours: Blue, black, white

The University of Port Elizabeth (UPE) was a public university located in Port Elizabeth in the Eastern Cape province of South Africa. UPE was founded on 31 January 1964, by an act of parliament, and held its first academic year in 1965. It offered bachelor's degrees, as well as masters and doctoral degrees. The university closed down in 2004, with its campuses forming part of the Nelson Mandela University, which opened in 2005.

== History ==
The university was founded as a dual medium institution, offering courses in both English and Afrikaans, catering for white students. Prior to UPE being established, Rhodes University offered courses in Port Elizabeth. The governing National Party, wanted a new university, as it attempted to limit the influence of Rhodes, which was seen as too liberal. From 1994 until 2004 the Chaplain of the university was Diana Nkesiga, a female, Anglican priest who had been ordained in Uganda.

In 2001, the University of Port Elizabeth gained control of Dower College of Education. This was in line with a plan for education colleges to become divisions of universities and technikons.

As part of the government's plan for higher education, Vista University's Port Elizabeth campus was merged into UPE in 2004.

In 2003, the merger proposal for Nelson Mandela Metropolitan University (NMMU) was announced.

UPE effectively shut down after the 2004 academic year, and was merged with Port Elizabeth Technikon on 1 January 2005.

== Campus ==
The initial campus of the university was located in Bird Street, in Central, Port Elizabeth, which had previously been used by Rhodes University.

In January 1974, the university moved to a newly built campus on 800 ha (2,000 acres) in Summerstrand.

The Bird Street campus was sold off during the 1990s.

The Dower campus would later become part of Bethelsdorp Technical College, which was ultimately merged into Port Elizabeth College in 2002.

The Vista campus was gained through the merger with Vista University's Port Elizabeth campus.

Following the NMMU merger, the main UPE campus became the South Campus of the new university. Vista campus became Missionvale campus, after initially being named Uitenhage Road campus. The Bird Street campus was reacquired, and became the Business School.

The University of Port Elizabeth campus was the largest university campus in the Southern Hemisphere.

== Faculties ==
UPE operated six faculties. These were the faculties of arts, education, economic sciences, science, law and health sciences.

== Sport ==
UPE offered many sports, including football, rugby and cricket. The main campus housed the University of Port Elizabeth Stadium, which was equipped with an all weather running track and flood lights. The university also ran a professional football club, FCK-UPE, in collaboration with F.C. Copenhagen.
