= Elrio van Heerden =

South African footballer

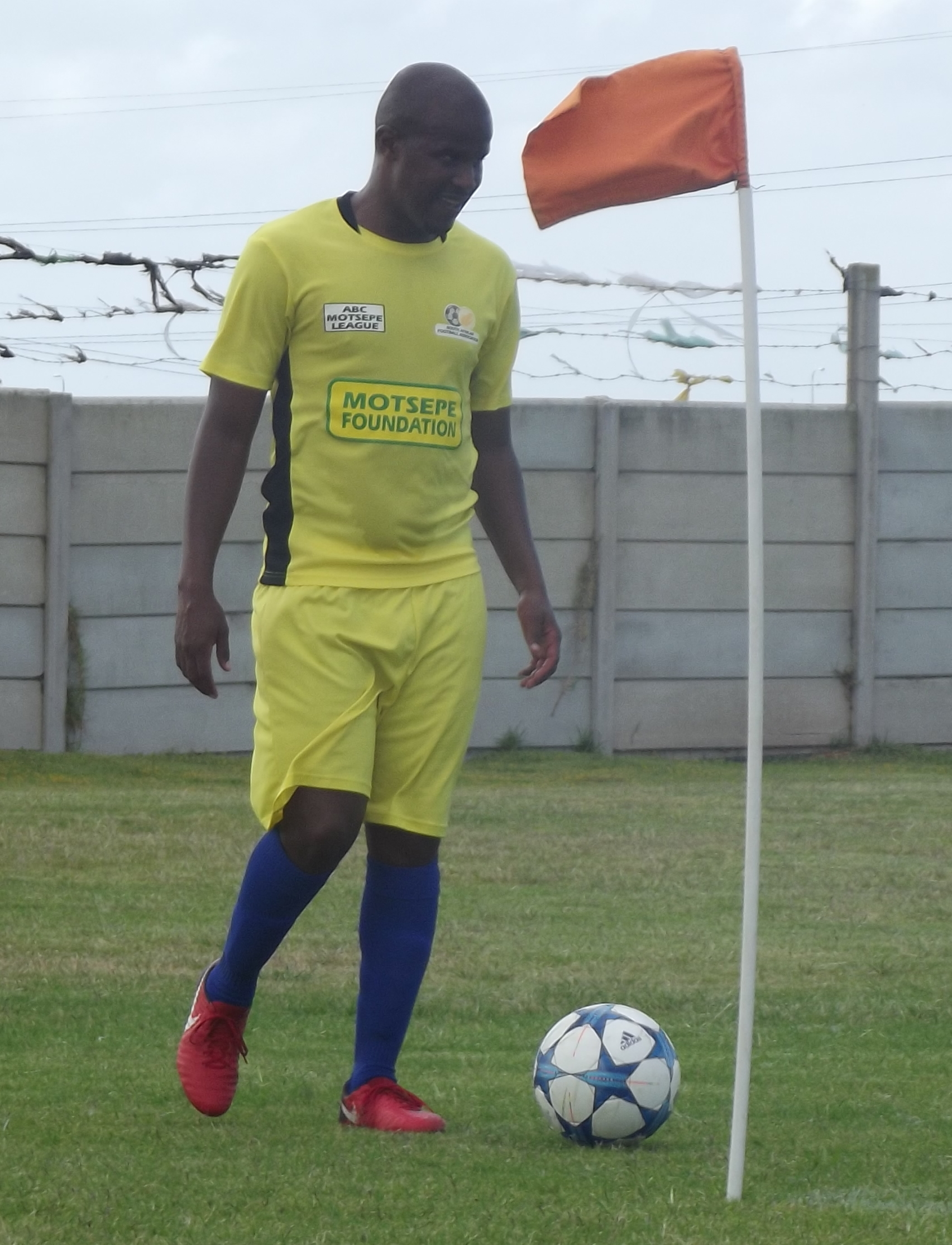
- van Heerden in 2017

Personal information
- Date of birth: 11 July 1983 (age 43)
- Place of birth: Port Elizabeth, South Africa
- Height: 1.68 m (5 ft 6 in)
- Positions: Midfielder; winger

Youth career
- 1995–1997: Glenville Celtic
- 1998–2001: NMMU

Senior career*
Years	Team	Apps	(Gls)
2002–2006	Copenhagen	25	(5)
2006–2009	Club Brugge	57	(1)
2009–2010	Blackburn Rovers	0	(0)
2010	Sivasspor	6	(0)
2010–2011	Westerlo	20	(0)
2011–2012	Golden Arrows	18	(0)
2017–2019	PE Stars	0	(0)
Total		126	(6)

International career
2004–2009	South Africa	37	(3)
- * Club domestic league appearances and goals

Elrio van Heerden (/ˈɛlrioʊ væn ˈhɪərdən/, Afrikaans: [ˈɛlrjuə fan ˈɦiərdən]; born 11 July 1983) is a South African retired professional footballer who played as a midfielder for the likes of Copenhagen, Club Brugge and Blackburn Rovers, among other clubs. He was previously also been an established member of the South Africa national team, representing the nation from 2004 to 2009.

== Club career ==
Van Heerden started his career with Glenville Celtic and moved 1998 in the Soccer School of Excellence which was part of the Nelson Mandela Metropolitan University.

=== FC Copenhagen ===
Van Heerden came to Denmark joining FC Copenhagen in 2002, where he spent his first two years learning from the older players. He got his debut in 2004 against AaB at Parken Stadium, and the little South African immediately wrote history with his equalizer short before the final whistle. The goal meant, that Copenhagen could secure the championship in the next (and last) round against FC Nordsjælland at Farum Park, which they did with a 4–2 victory.

=== Club Brugge ===
A move to Club Brugge was made on 24 January 2006, where Van Heerden spent two years with the Belgian club scoring two goals from his 67 appearances.

=== Blackburn Rovers ===
It was announced on 2 June 2009 that Van Heerden had agreed a two-year deal with the Premier League club Blackburn Rovers, arriving on a free transfer from Club Brugge. He only played two official matches for the club; in the League Cup against Gillingham in the second round, and Chelsea in the quarter-finals, both as a second-half substitute.

On 8 January 2010, it was reported that Elrio was close to signing for Turkish club Sivasspor. Goal.com revealed that Elrio was due to travel to Turkey for a medical ahead of signing on Monday 11 January 2010.

=== Sivasspor ===
On 11 January 2010, Blackburn Rovers announced the transfer of Van Heerden to Sivasspor.

=== Westerlo ===
On 27 July 2010, Belgian Pro League side Westerlo announced the signing of Van Heerden.

In November 2012, after having been without a club since the end of the 2011–12 season, Van Heerden had an unsuccessful trial with MLS side Sporting Kansas City.

=== PE Stars ===
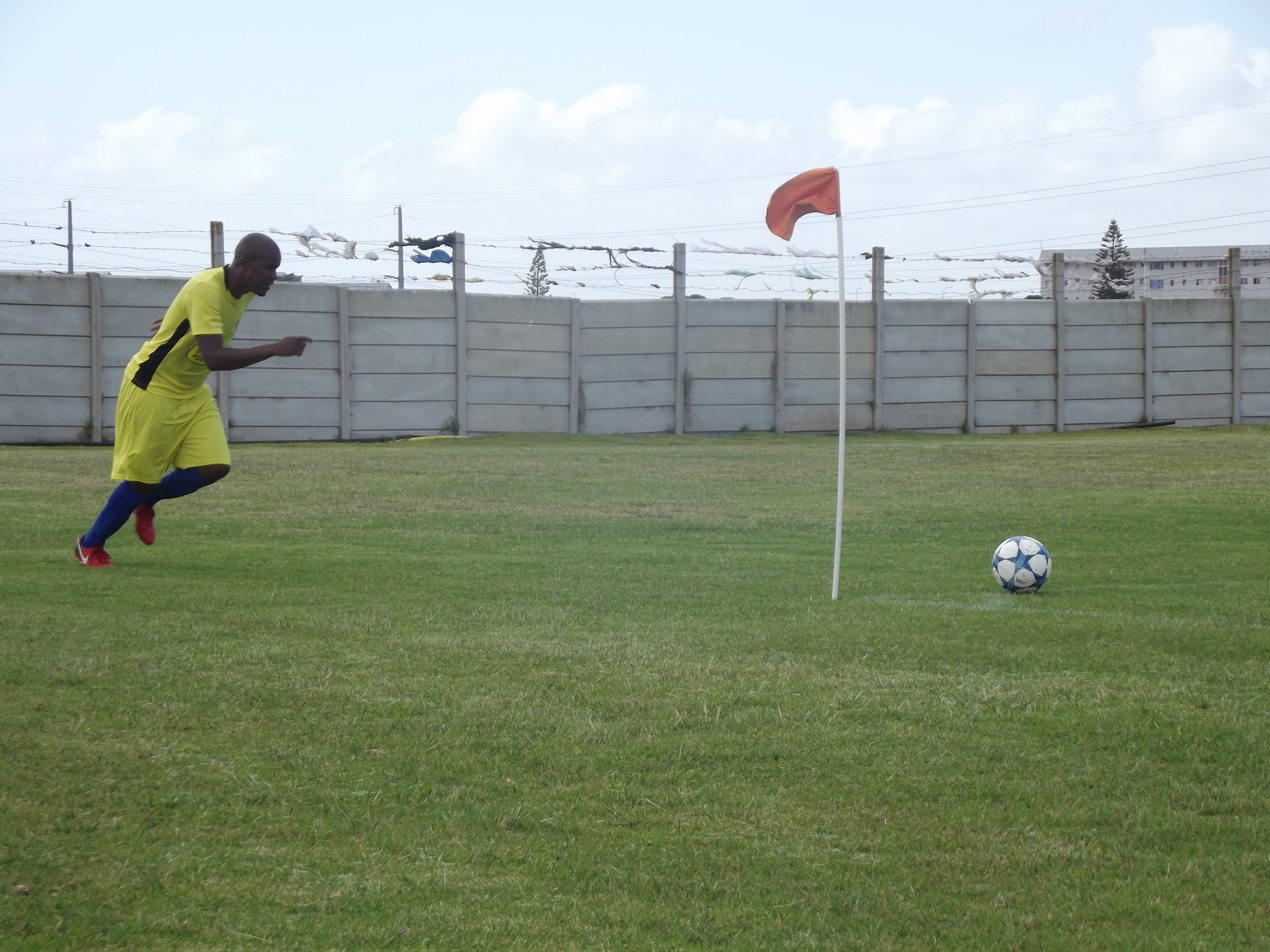
van Heerden taking a corner for PE Stars

In 2017, after five years out of the game, van Heerden returned to sign for ABC Motsepe League side PE Stars.

== International career ==
Van Heerden won 37 full international caps for South Africa, scoring three goals. He represented Bafana Bafana at the 2006 Africa Cup of Nations in Egypt, the 2008 Africa Cup of Nations in Ghana and the 2009 FIFA Confederations Cup in South Africa.

== Career statistics ==
South Africa national team
Year	Apps	Goals
2004	6	0
2005	10	1
2006	4	0
2007	3	0
2008	4	2
2009	10	0
Total	37	3

#	Date	Venue	Opponent	Score	Result	Competition
1	6 July 2005	Home Depot Center, United States	Mexico	2–0	2–1	2005 CONCACAF Gold Cup
2	23 January 2008	Tamale, Ghana	Angola	1–1	1–1	2008 African Cup of Nations
3	31 January 2008	Kumasi, Ghana	Senegal	1–0	1–1	2008 African Cup of Nations
