= Varsity Sports (South Africa) =

Varsity Sports South Africa
- Conference: USSA
- Founded: 2012; 14 years ago
- Commissioner: Francois Pienaar (since 2012)
- Sports fielded: 7
- No. of teams: 24
- Headquarters: Cape Town, Western Cape
- Region: South Africa
- Official website: varsitysportssa.com

Varsity Sports SA, is a group university sports leagues in South Africa. Its members all belong to the University Sport Company, and may each enter only one campus per competition, though they may enter different campuses for different competitions.

== History ==
The Varsity Cup tournament was founded in 2008, featuring the rugby teams of eight universities. Varsity Sports was created as an offshoot in 2012. In the first season rugby sevens and beach volleyball were played. In 2013, athletics, field hockey, association football and netball were added. In 2016, mountain biking was added.

== Member universities ==
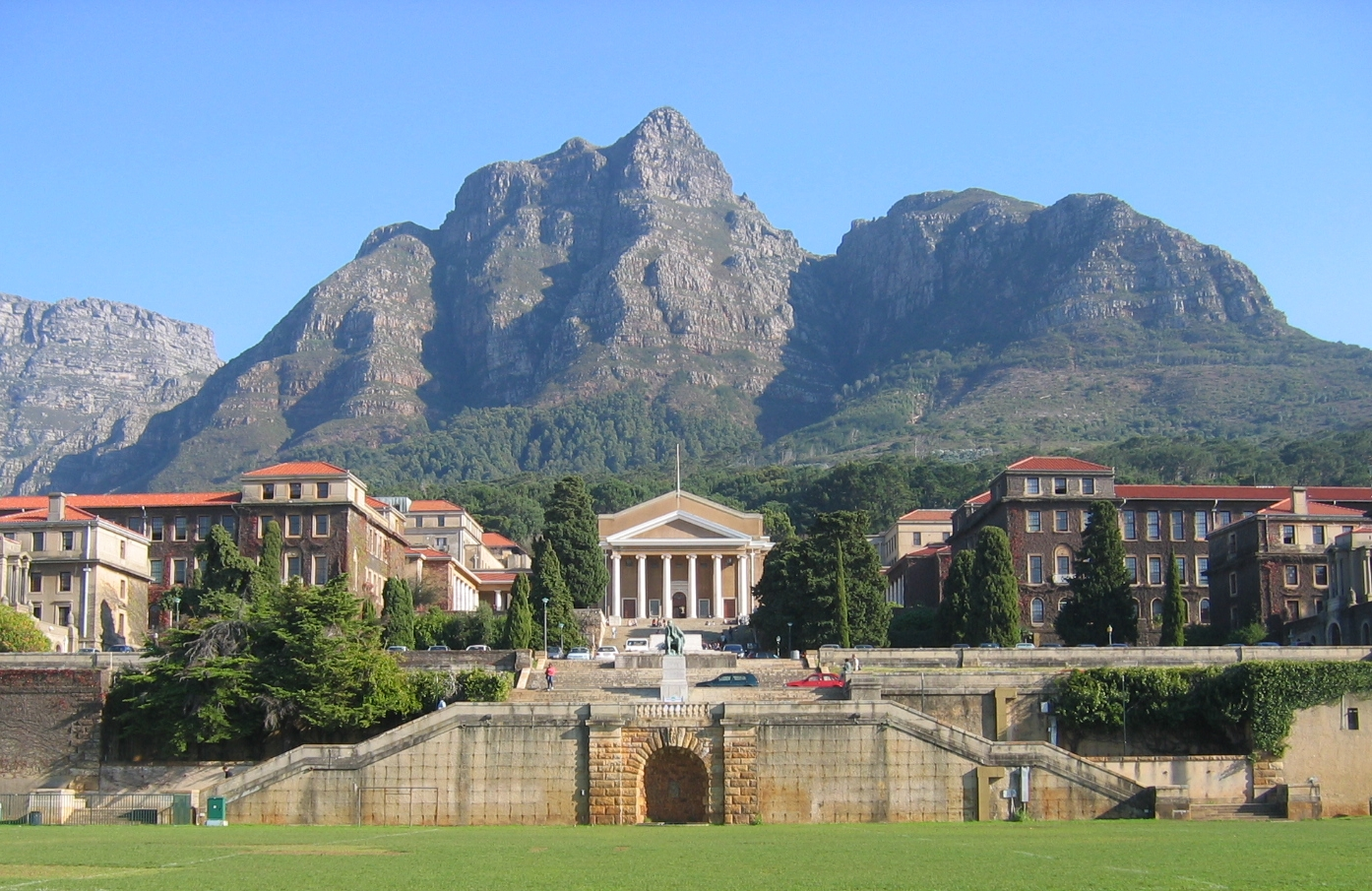

| Institution | Location | Founded | Joined | Type | Enrollment | Nickname | Colors | Varsity Sports Championships (As of 19 May 2014) (excludes varsity rugby) | Varsity Cup Championships (As of 7 April 2014) |
|---|---|---|---|---|---|---|---|---|---|
| University of Cape Town | Cape Town, Western Cape | 1829 | 2008 | Public | | Ikeys | Blue and white | | 2 |
| Stellenbosch University | Stellenbosch, Cape Town and Saldanha Bay, Western Cape | 1866 | 2008 | Public | | Maties | Maroon | 3 | 3 |
| University of Pretoria | Pretoria and Johannesburg, Gauteng | 1908 | 2008 | Public | | Tuks | White and red | 3 | 2 |
| University of Johannesburg | Johannesburg and Soweto, Gauteng | 2005 | 2008 | Public | | UJ | Orange | 1 | |
| Nelson Mandela Metropolitan University | Port Elizabeth, Eastern Cape and George, Western Cape | 2005 | 2008 | Public | | Madibaz | Blue and red | | |
| Tshwane University of Technology | Pretoria, Ga-Rankuwa and Soshanguve, Gauteng, Nelspruit and Witbank, Mpumalanga and Polokwane, Limpopo | 2003 | 2008 | Public | | TUT | | | |
| University of the Free State | Bloemfontein and QwaQwa, Free State | 1904 | 2008 | Public | | Kovsies | Orange | 1 | |
| North-West University | Potchefstroom and Mahikeng, North West and Vanderbijlpark, Gauteng | 2004 | 2008 | Public | | Eagles | Purple | | |
| University of Witwatersrand | Johannesburg, Gauteng | 1896 | 2011 | Public | | Wits | White | | |
| University of the Western Cape | Cape Town, Western Cape | 1959 | 2011 | Public | | UWC | | 2 | |
| University of Fort Hare | Alice, Bisho and East London, Eastern Cape | 1916 | 2011 | Public | | UFH | | | |
| Rhodes University | Grahamstown, Eastern Cape | 1904 | 2011 | Public | | Rhodes | Purple | | |
| University of Limpopo | Mankweng, Limpopo | 2005 | 2012 | Public | | Turfloop | | | |
| Vaal University of Technology | Vanderbijlpark, Gauteng | 1966 | 2013 | Public | | VUT | | | |

== Sports ==
Varsity Sports currently runs competitions in six sporting codes. These are athletics, beach volleyball, association football, field hockey, netball and rugby sevens. Athletics and football have events for both men and women. Rugby, has only a men's event. Volleyball, netball and hockey have only female events, though men's hockey will be added in 2014.

=== List of Varsity sports ===
| Sport | Type | Years |
|---|---|---|
| Athletics | Core | 2013–2019 |
| Basketball | Core | 2018–2021 |
| Beach Volleyball | Core | 2012, 2013, 2015–2017 |
| Cricket | Core | 2015–2019, 2022 |
| Esports | Core | 2025– |
| Football (Men) | Core | 2013–present |
| Football (Women) | Core | 2013–present |
| Hockey | Core | 2013–2019, 2022 |
| Netball | Core | 2013–present |
| Rugby sevens | Core | 2013–2019, 2022 |
| Mountain biking | | 2016-2017, 2019 |

== Season summaries ==
=== 2012 ===
In 2012, the only events held were for rugby sevens and beach volleyball.

Ten teams took part in sevens rugby. They were, UFS, NMMU, UCT, TUT, UP-Tuks, UWC, NWU-Pukke, Limpopo, Maties and UJ. The University of Stellenbosh won the first rugby sevens title. They won both of the tournaments, held in Plettenberg Bay and Margate.

Seven teams took part in beach volleyball. They were UWC, UJ, UP-Tuks, UCT, Limpopo, NMMU and TUT. The University of the Western Cape won the tournament. The Plettenbrg Bay event was called off before the final, due to bad weather.

=== 2013 ===
In 2013, the season began with a three meeting athletics series. The overall winner was UP-Tuks.

That was followed by a women's field hockey tournament, which was won by Maties.

The 2013 Varsity Football tournament was won by UP-Tuks.

The 2013 Women's Varsity Football tournament was won by UJ Ladies.

The inaugural Varsity Netball competition was won by UFS-Kovsies.

The 2013 rugby sevens and volleyball tournaments were won by defending champions Maties and UWC respectively.

=== 2014 ===
The 2014 saw a four meeting athletics series, and a men's hockey tournament replacing the women's one from 2013.

The 2014 Varsity Football season will begin in July, and will be followed by netball, rugby sevens and beach volleyball.

=== 2019 ===
The inaugural Varsity Women's Rugby 7s, Basketball.

=== 2020 ===
Cancelled due to the COVID-19 pandemic, football could restart.

=== 2021 ===
This tournaments, football and netball, will take place in a secure COVID-19 bio-bubble called the Varsity Sport Village, matches will be played at University of Pretoria and Stellenbosch University.

== See also ==
- Varsity Football (South Africa)
- Varsity Rugby
- Women's Varsity Football
