= Orebotse Mongae =

South African soccer player

Personal information
- Date of birth: 31 July 1993 (age 33)
- Place of birth: Mafikeng, South Africa
- Position: Midfielder

Team information
- Current team: Upington City

Youth career
- North-West University

Senior career*
Years	Team	Apps	(Gls)
–2018	Jwaneng Galaxy		
2018	→ Miscellaneous (loan)		
2018–2019	Baroka	15	(0)
2020	Royal Eagles	1	(0)
2020–2021	BCM Stars		
2021–2022	Platinum City Rovers	16	(0)
2022–2024	TS Galaxy	55	(5)
2024–	Upington City	4	(0)
- * Club domestic league appearances and goals as of 14 November 2024

Orebotse Mongae (born 31 July 1993) is a South African soccer player who plays as a midfielder for Upington City in the National First Division.

Mongae was born in Mafikeng and attended North-West University. After an unassuming career in lower divisions, he moved abroad to Botswana. Mongae played for Jwaneng Galaxy and in 2018 he went on loan to Miscellaneous. He managed to score double-digits in the 2017–18 season. Having gone on trial at Bidvest Wits in January 2018, he signed for Baroka in May 2018.

Mongae then made his first-tier debut in the 2018-19 South African Premier Division. In December 2019, the Baroka manager Wedson Nyirenda left the club. After that, Baroka released Mongae and three other players. Mongae later spoke on a lack of understanding between him and Nyirenda. He tried to join Highlands Park, but the trial was unsuccessful and he instead joined Royal Eagles on a short-term deal.

In January 2022, he was signed by TS Galaxy from Platinum City Rovers, and in March he managed to score his first Premier Division goal against SuperSport United. The team barely managed to avoid relegation, and thus decided to give Mongae a new contract lasting until 2025. He finally made his breakthrough during the 2022-23 South African Premier Division, playing the majority of the games.

In April 2024, a tackle by Mongae on Zungu, for which Mongae was red-carded, stirred a minor controversy. In the summer of 2024 he was released by TS Galaxy, only to be swiftly signed by second-tier team Upington City.

He is nicknamed "Bobo".
