= Varsity Football (South Africa) =

- Founded: 2013; 13 years ago
- Region: South Africa
- Teams: 8
- Current champions: UFS (1st title) (men); UWC (4th title) (women)
- Most championships: TUT (5 titles) (men); TUT (6 titles) (women)
- Website: varsitysportssa.com/football

Varsity Football is a South African university football competition. It is one of seven sports in the Varsity Sports series. The annual tournament involves the top football playing universities in the country, which belong to the University Sports Company. The tournament is run by Varsity Sports South Africa, and is endorsed by the South African Football Association and University Sport South Africa. All matches are televised live on SuperSport, elevating the visibility of the competition and serving as a vital development platform for student-athletes, many of whom transition to the professional Hollywoodbets Super League (Women) or the South African Premiership (Men).

== History ==
The Varsity Cup tournament was founded in 2008, featuring the rugby teams of eight universities. Varsity Sports was expanded in 2012 to include other sporting codes. University Sport South Africa discussed the Varsity Football proposal at its 2012 annual general meeting. The idea was initially rejected, as it was seen to split the member institutions. However, it was later accepted, and 2013 was the inaugural season of Varsity Football, with an 8 team men's tournament. A four-team women's tournament was also played. Tshwane University of Technology (TUT) women's won six (6) times while Tshwane University of Technology (TUT) men's won four (times) and current champions for 2025 is University of Western Cape both (Women) and the University of the Free State (Men)

== Participating teams ==
As of 2025, 8 different teams have competed in the men's Varsity Football tournament:

Team Name	University	Stadium
UJ Men's Football	University of Johannesburg	UJ Stadium
NWU Men's Football	North-West University	Mafikeng Sports Fields
UFS Men's Football	University of the Free State	Shimla Park
TUT Men's Football	Tshwane University of Technology	TUT Stadium
UP-Tuks Men's Football	University of Pretoria	Tuks Stadium
Wits Men's Football	University of the Witwatersrand	Bidvest Stadium
CUT Men's Football	Central University of Technology	CUT Stadium
DUT Men's Football	Durban University of Technology	Harry Gwala Stadium

== Varsity Football Women's Teams ==
Eight different teams have competed in the women's Varsity Football tournament as of 2025:

Team Name	University
UJ Women's Football	University of Johannesburg
UP-Tuks Women's Football	University of Pretoria
UWC Women's Football	University of the Western Cape
Wits Women's Football	University of the Witwatersrand
TUT Women's Football	Tshwane University of Technology
CPUT Women's Football	Cape Peninsula University of Technology
NWU Women's Football	North-West University
UNIVEN Women's Football	University of Venda

=== Qualification ===
For both the men's and women's tournaments, qualification is based on the previous season's University Sports South Africa Football National Club Championships, held annually in December. In order to qualify, men's teams need to be one of the eight highest placed teams associated with Varsity Sports. Women's teams needed to be one of the semi-finalists, and also be associated with Varsity Sports.

Teams not associated with the University Sports Company are not eligible for the competition. UKZN Pietermaritzburg for example, a losing semi-finalist at the 2012 men's University Sports South Africa Football National Club Championships, were ineligible, not being linked to Varsity Sports. The next highest placed teams at the University Sports South Africa Football National Club Championships, that are associated with Varsity Sports, will take the places of the ineligible teams.

== Format ==
The tournament begins with a round robin stage, in which all teams play each other once. After the round robin stage, the top 4 teams advance to the knockout stage. The teams ranked 1 and 2 host the semi-finals, against the teams ranked 4 and 3 respectively. The winners advance to the final, to be hosted by the highest ranked finalist. The league scoring system follows a standard scoring system and awards 3 points for a win, and 1 point for a draw. Teams are separated first on points, and then on goal difference.

The Varsity Football Women's tournament features 8 top university teams, qualifying primarily through the previous year's USSA National Club Championships. The competition is typically shorter and more condensed than the men's event, often held over two weeks or at a single venue. The format involves an initial Group Stage, where teams are split into two pools and play a round-robin format. The top two teams from each group then advance to the knockout Semi-Finals, with the winners proceeding to the final match to be crowned the tournament champion.

All matches are played on Monday evenings.

== Varsity Football Men's Winners ==
Year	Winner
2013	UP-Tuks
2014	UP-Tuks
2015	UWC
2016	TUT
2017	UP-Tuks
2018	TUT
2019	NWU
2020	Suspended due to COVID-19
2021	UJ
2022	TUT
2023	TUT
2024	UWC
2025	UFS
2026	TUT

University	Titles won
TUT	5
UP-Tuks	3
UWC	2
UJ	1
NWU	1
UFS	1

== Varsity Football Women's Winners ==
Year	Winner
2013	UJ
2014	TUT
2015	TUT
2016	TUT
2017	TUT
2018	TUT
2019	TUT
2020	Suspended due to COVID-19
2021	UWC
2022	UJ
2023	UWC
2024	UWC
2025	UWC

University	Titles won
TUT	6
UWC	4
UJ	2

== Notable players ==
Players who have since represented Bafana Bafana.

- Thabo Mnyamane NWU-Mafikeng

== Sponsors ==
The tournament is sponsored by:

- First National Bank
- Suzuki
- Cashbuild
- SportPesa

Preferred Suppliers:

- SuperSport
- RedBull
- Lift
- Southern Sun
- Gilbert
- Hertz
- aQuelle
