= NMU Stadium =

Athletics stadium in Port Elizabeth, South Africa

Madibaz Stadium
- Interactive map of Madibaz Stadium
- Full name: Mandela University Sports Stadium
- Former names: University of Port Elizabeth Stadium; Mecer Stadium; Xerox Stadium
- Location: Marine Drive; Summerstrand; Port Elizabeth; South Africa
- Coordinates: 34.008936°S 25.679037°E
- Owner: Nelson Mandela University
- Operator: Nelson Mandela University
- Capacity: 15, 000
- Surface: Grass and athletics track

Tenants
- Nelson Mandela University Madibaz Soccer; Nelson Mandela University Madibaz Rugby; Nelson Mandela University Madibaz Athletics

Nelson Mandela University Sports Stadium commonly referred to as Madibaz Stadium, is an athletics stadium in Protea Road, on the South Campus of Nelson Mandela University in Port Elizabeth, South Africa.

The stadium hosts Nelson Mandela University Madibaz Rugby home matches, including Varsity Cup matches. It also hosts Nelson Mandela University Madibaz Soccer matches during Varsity Football, and athletics meetings.

After being upgraded to meet FIFA specifications, the stadium was used as a training facility during the 2010 FIFA World Cup and 2013 Africa Cup of Nations.

== Professional matches ==
Date	Time (UTC+2)	Team #1	Res.	Team #2	Tournament	Attendance
2010-01-04	19.05	(South Africa) Moroka Swallows	1–2	(Germany) VfL Wolfsburg	Friendly	
2018-09-22	15.00	(South Africa) Southern Kings	underway	(Scotland) Glasgow Warriors	Pro14	
