= Kamaal Sait =

South African footballer

Personal information
- Place of birth: South Africa
- Position(s): Defender, Midfielder

Senior career*
Years	Team	Apps	(Gls)
- Matroosfontein FC
- Santos F.C.
- Ajax Cape Town F.C.
- AmaZulu F.C.
- Orlando Pirates F.C.
2002/2003	Santos F.C.		
- *Club domestic league appearances and goals

Kamaal Sait (born in South Africa) is a South African retired footballer.

== Career ==
During his playing days, Sait was regarded as one South Africa's best utility players.

In 2002, he returned to Santos but was red-carded on debut against Black Leopards in the MTN 8.

In 2004, Sait retired because coaches deemed him too old to play despite being only 32 years old.
