= Summerstrand =

Seaside suburb of Port Elizabeth, South Africa

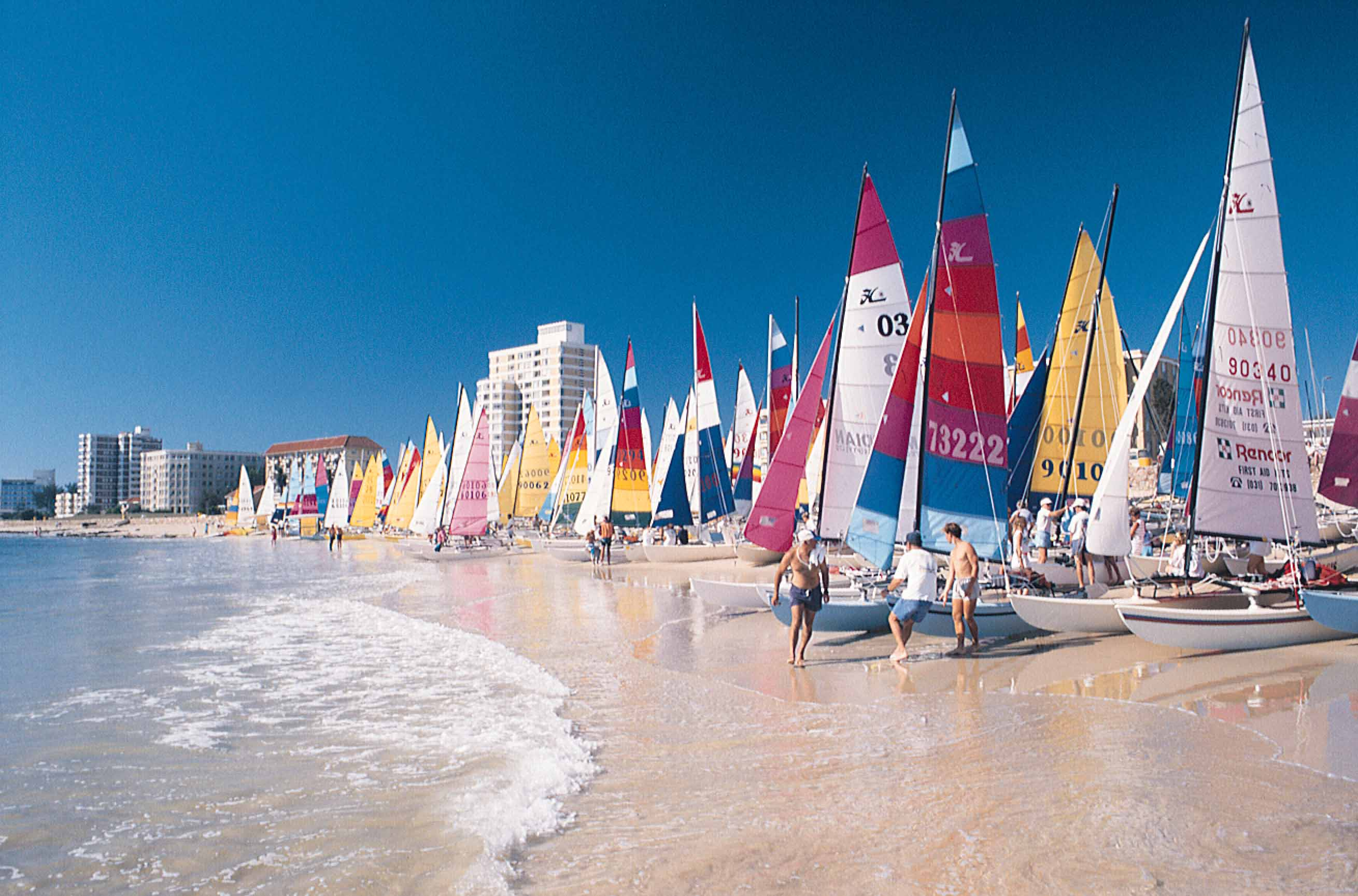
- Yachts lining up on Summerstrand's Hobie Beach

- Location within Eastern Cape Location within South Africa Location within Africa
- Coordinates: 33°59′29″S 25°39′25″E
- Country: South Africa
- Province: Eastern Cape
- Municipality: Nelson Mandela Bay
- Main Place: Gqeberha

Area
  - Total: 7.96 km^{2} (3.07 sq mi)

Population
  - Total: 12,614
  - Density: 1,580/km^{2} (4,100/sq mi)

Racial makeup (2011)
  - Black African: 26.0%
  - Coloured: 6.0%
  - Indian/Asian: 3.0%
  - White: 63.0%
  - Other: 2.0%

First languages (2011)
  - English: 55.7%
  - Afrikaans: 27.0%
  - Xhosa: 10.3%
  - Other: 7.0%
- Time zone: UTC+2 (SAST)
- Postal code (street): 6001
- PO box: 6019

Summerstrand is a seaside suburb of Gqeberha in the Eastern Cape province of South Africa. It is located 6 km (3.7 mi) south-east of the Gqeberha city centre. It is primarily a residential suburb along with shopping and business facilities. It is also home to three Nelson Mandela University campuses.

== Geography ==
Summerstrand lies on the Indian Ocean coastline between Humewood in the north and the Nelson Mandela Metro University Nature Reserve in the south.

The M4 passes through the suburb along the coast connecting the Port Elizabeth CBD to the north with Schoenmakerskop to the south. The M13 connects the inner suburban area of Summerstrand with Humewood to the north.

== Demographics ==
The population of Summerstrand is 12,614. Over half of the population are English-speaking Whites of British descent. 10.3% of people in Summerstrand are Xhosa people, and 5.6% are Coloureds who speak Afrikaans as a first language. There are also White South Africans who speak Afrikaans as a first language, as well as Indian South Africans.

== Government and politics ==
Summerstrand is located in the Nelson Mandela Bay Metropolitan Municipality which governs the city of Port Elizabeth, Despatch, Uitenhage and surroundings.

== Education ==
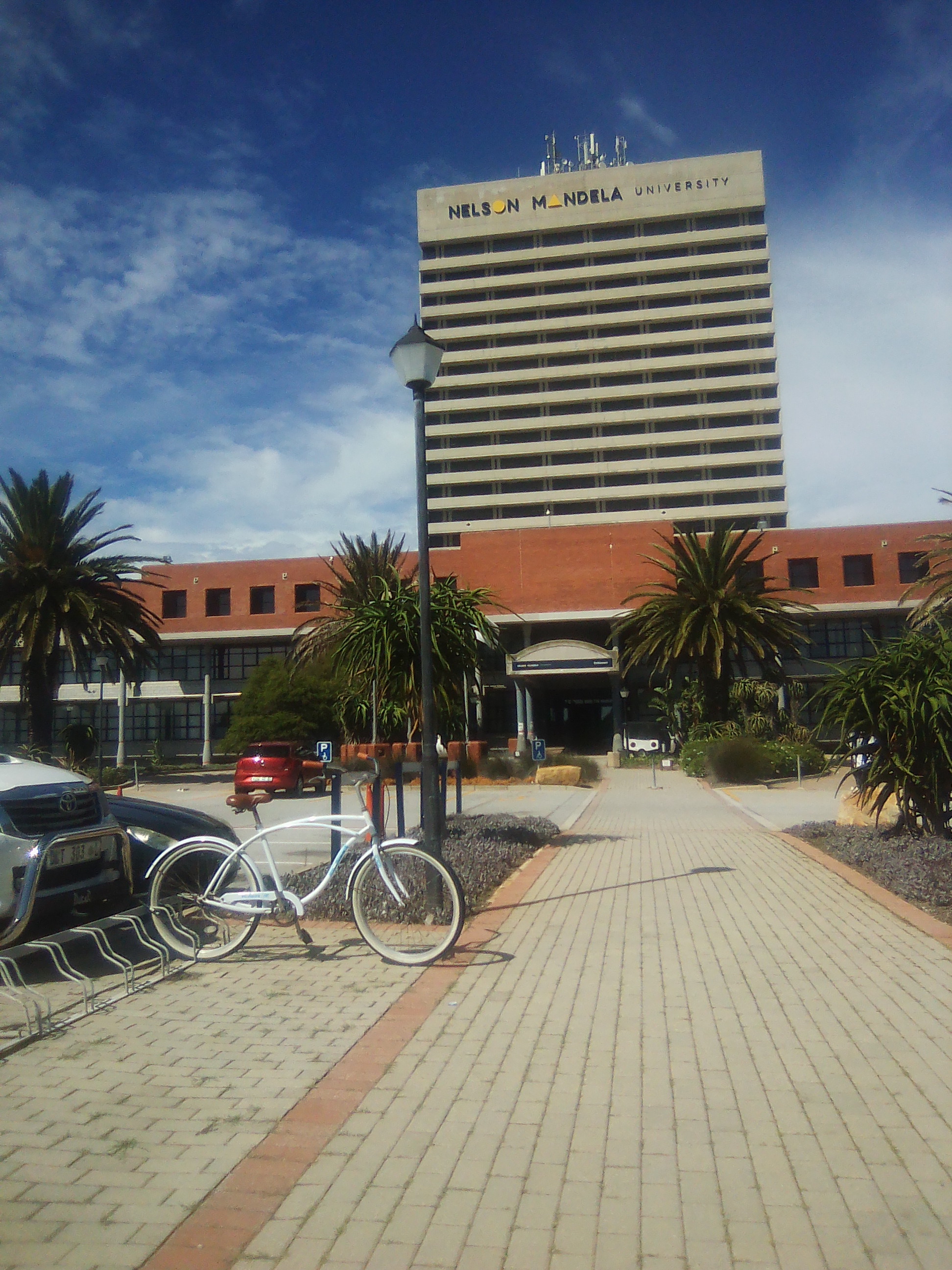
Nelson Mandela University's South Campus

The southern part of Summerstrand is dominated by the Nelson Mandela University (NMU). Nelson Mandela University has its south (main) and North Campus in the southern part, with the 2nd Avenue Campus in the northern part.

Although the suburb is dominated by NMU, there are also other schools such as:

- Cape Recife High School
- Dolfyntjie Pre-Primary School
- Pearson High School
- Summerwood Primary School

== Entertainment ==
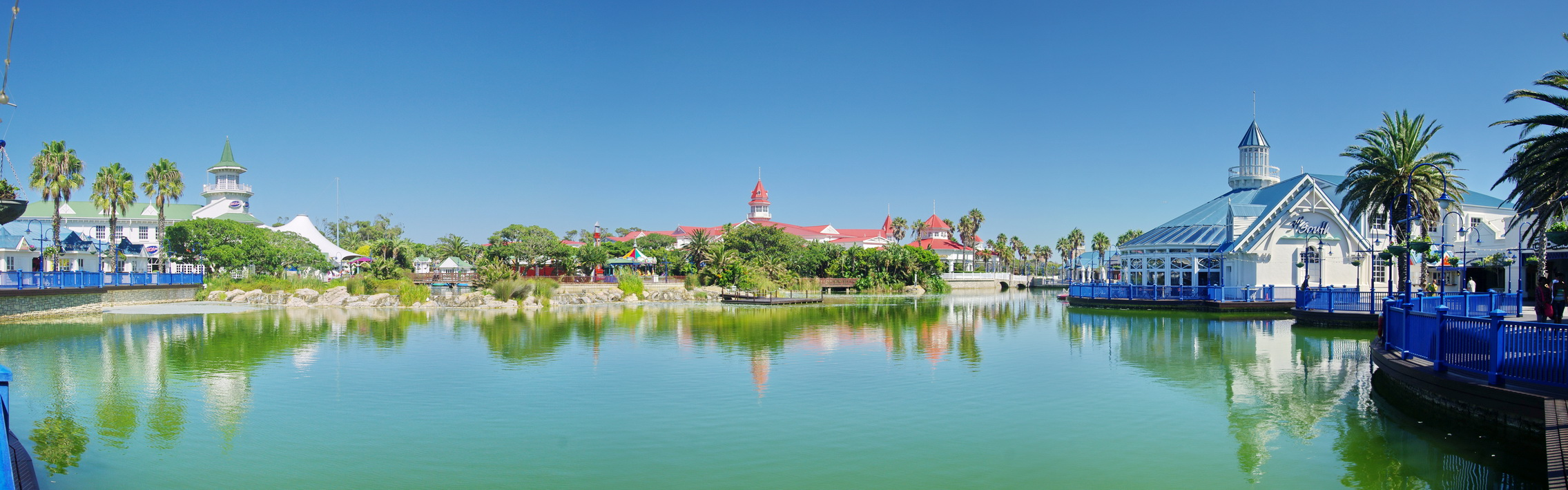
Boardwalk Casino and Entertainment World

Summerstrand is home to the Boardwalk Casino and Entertainment World, the only casino in the Nelson Mandela Bay Metro. The casino also includes a hotel and is owned by Sun International. The complex was recently updated with a shopping centre, replacing the original open-area design with a closed mall surrounding a courtyard.

There are many hotels in Summerstrand, such as Road Lodge Port Elizabeth, Radisson Blu Port Elizabeth and Protea Hotel (by Marriot) Port Elizabeth Marine. There are also numerous guest houses and lodges in Summerstrand.

There is also the nearby Bayworld in Humewood, a museum complex comprising the Museum, Oceanarium, and Snake Park. Summerstrand is also near the Cape Recife Nature Reserve.

== Sport and recreation ==
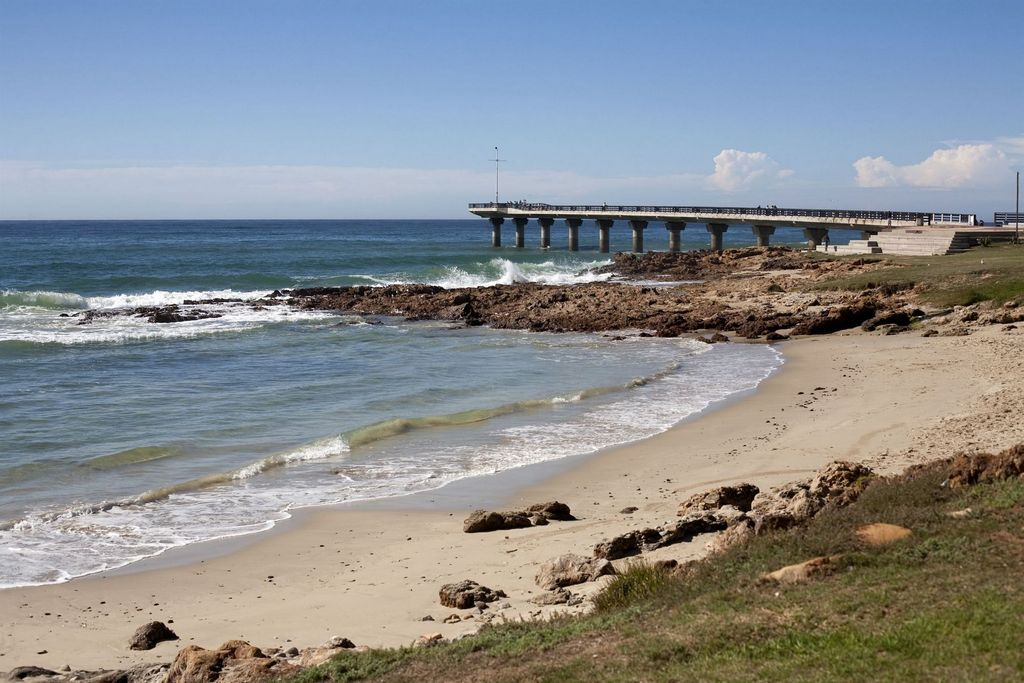
A view of Hobie Beach in the foreground with the Shark Rock Pier in the background

There are also two beaches in Summerstrand, Hobie and Pollok Beach. Hobie Beach is a famous beach in Port Elizabeth and includes the Shark Rock Pier, the only pier in Nelson Mandela Bay. There are also the nearby Kings Beach and Humewood Beaches in Humewood, with Kings Beach being Port Elizabeth's flagship beach.

Apart from the beaches there are also other sports and recreation facilities, such as the Humewood Golf Club and the Summerstrand Tennis Club.

== Notable people ==
- Govan Mbeki, anti-apartheid activist and father of Former President Thabo Mbeki.
- Raymond Mhlaba, anti-apartheid activist and first Premier of the Eastern Cape.
