= Bidvest Stadium =

Sports venue in Johannesburg, South Africa

- Interactive map of Bidvest Stadium
- Former names: Milpark Stadium
- Location: Yale Road; Braamfontein, Johannesburg, Gauteng, South Africa
- Coordinates: 26°11′16″S 28°1′42″E
- Owner: Wits University
- Capacity: 5,000
- Surface: Grass
- Field size: 105 m × 68 m (115 yd × 74 yd)

Tenant
- Bidvest Wits

Bidvest Stadium, is a multipurpose sports stadium in the Braamfontein, suburb of Johannesburg, South Africa.

The stadium has a dedicated field to host football matches with a capacity of 5,000 seats, and other fields to host other sports disciplines. The stadium is at the Wits University campus and was used as a home ground of Bidvest Wits in the Premiership.

During the 2010 FIFA World Cup, it was also used as a training venue by the Netherlands national football team.
