= Nelson Mandela University =

University in Port Elizabeth, South Africa

- Nelson Mandela Universiteit (Afrikaans)
- Former names: Nelson Mandela Metropolitan University; University of Port Elizabeth; Port Elizabeth Technikon; Vista University; Saasveld Forestry College
- Motto: Change the world
- Type: Public university
- Established: 1882 (Port Elizabeth Art School); 2005 (Nelson Mandela Metropolitan University)
- Affiliations: IAU: AAU; HESA; ACU
- Chairperson: Nozipho January-Bardill
- Chancellor: Dr Grace Naledi Mandisa Pandor
- Vice-Chancellor: Sibongile Muthwa
- Administrative staff: 4,063
- Students: 28,000
- Undergraduates: 23,500
- Postgraduates: 4,500
- Location: Summerstrand, Gqeberha and Saasveld, George, South Africa; 34.009°S 25.67°E
- Campus: 6 Suburban, 1 Urban and 1 Countryside
- Newspaper: MadibazNews
- Colours: Blue; White; Yellow
- Nickname: Madibaz
- Sporting affiliations: FNB Varsity Cup; Varsity Sports Football Challenge
- Mascot: Diba the Dolphin
- Website: www.mandela.ac.za

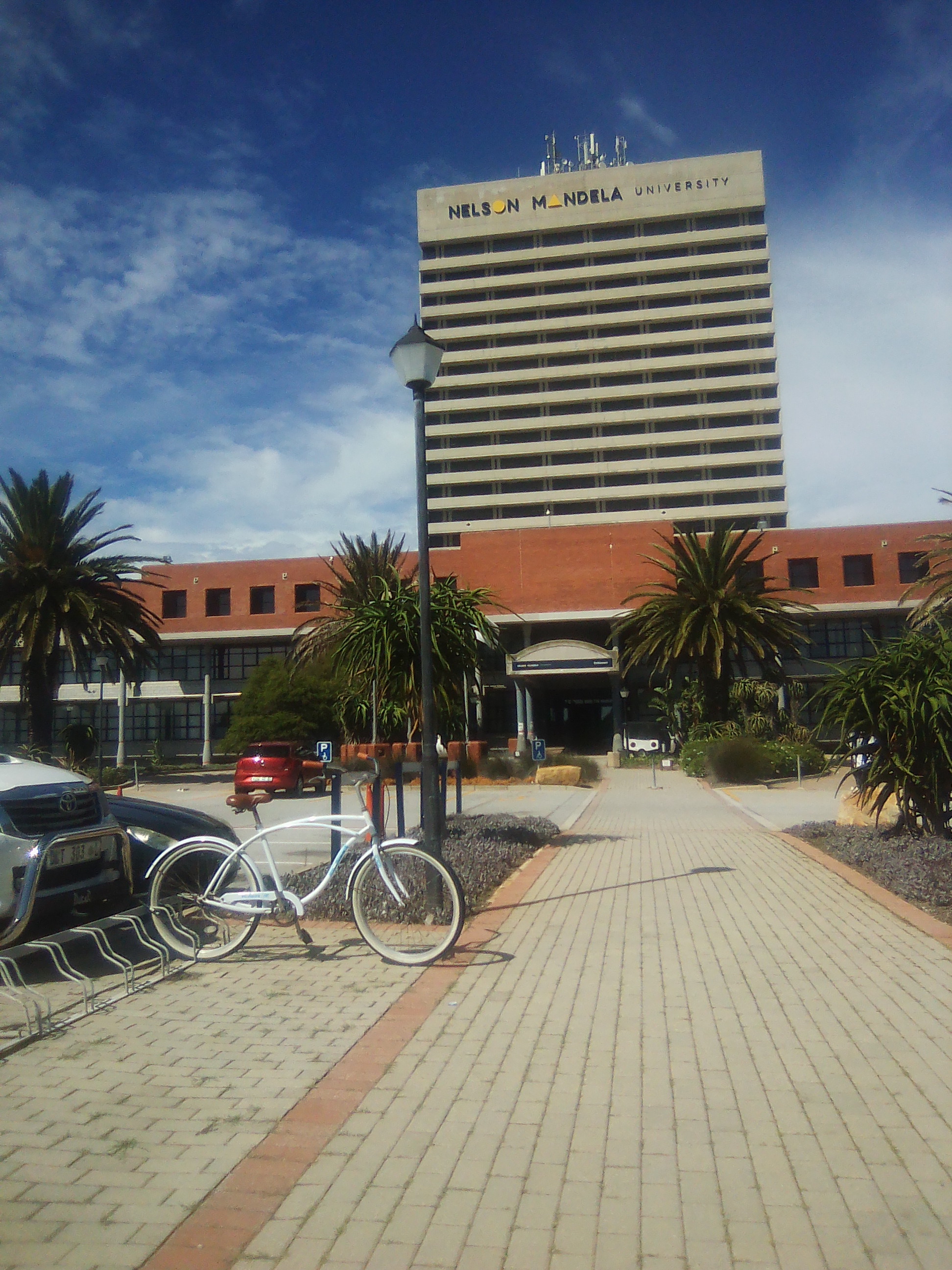
South Campus

Nelson Mandela University, formerly Nelson Mandela Metropolitan University, is a public university in South Africa. Mainly in the coastal city of Gqeberha (formerly Port Elizabeth), it was established in 1882 as Port Elizabeth Art School and comprises the former University of Port Elizabeth, the Port Elizabeth Technikon and Vista University's Port Elizabeth campus.

Nelson Mandela University was founded through a merger of three institutions in January 2005, but its history dates back to 1882, with the foundation of the Port Elizabeth Art School. It is a comprehensive university offering professional and vocational training. The university has seven campuses – six in Gqeberha and one in George. The main campus of the university is the South Campus. Students at Nelson Mandela University can study towards a diploma or a degree up to doctoral level. Some courses include workplace experience as part of the curriculum at Nelson Mandela University. English is the university's medium of instruction.

== History and formation ==
Plans for the then NMMU where first revealed in 2002, by then Minister of Education, Kader Asmal. The proposal was part of larger plan to restructure higher education in South Africa. The first step in the merger came with the incorporation of Vista PE by UPE on 2 January 2004, followed by the merger of PE Technikon and UPE on 1 January 2005.

NMMU was formed in 2005 through the merger of the Port Elizabeth Technikon, and the University of Port Elizabeth. In 2004, prior to the merger, UPE had taken control of the Port Elizabeth Campus of Vista University. PE Technikon had a satellite campus in George, which was also merged. The first chancellor of the university was Chief Justice Pius Langa, and Justice Ronnie Pillay was the first chairperson of Council. Rolf Stumpf was the first vice-chancellor and chief executive officer of the university, and was succeeded by Professor Derrick Swartz on 1 January 2008. Professor Sibongile Muthwa is the current vice-chancellor after her appointment in 2017.

The name of the university was formally changed from Nelson Mandela Metropolitan University to Nelson Mandela University on 20 July 2017.

=== PE Technikon ===
PE Technikon had its roots in the Port Elizabeth Art School, which was founded in 1882 and was the oldest art school in South Africa, situated in Russell Road, Central. It was later renamed the College for Advanced Technical Education (CATE). The college moved to University Way in Summerstrand in 1974, and became PE Technikon in 1979. The Port Elizabeth Teachers' Training College was located in 2nd Avenue, Summerstrand. It was taken over by PE Technikon in 1994, and became known as the College Campus.

Saasveld Forestry College was founded as the Tokai School for Forest Apprentices in 1912 in Cape Town. The school was an offshoot of the South African College Schools. In 1932, it moved to its current location, between George and Knysna. The campus was taken over by PE Technikon from the Department of Agriculture in 1985.

The Algoa College of Education was situated in Struandale, approximately 25 kilometres (16 mi) away from Summerstrand. It became part of the PE Technikon in 2001, and was known as the Algoa Campus. In 2001, the George Campus was added to by purchasing Hurteria Building in the city centre.

At the time of the merger, PE Technikon had more than 10 000 students. The institution's last Chancellor was former Speaker of Parliament Frene Ginwala, the last Vice-Chancellor Prof Hennie Snyman and the last Chair of Council being Mr Clive Stanton.

=== University of Port Elizabeth ===
The University of Port Elizabeth was the country's first dual-medium (English and Afrikaans) residential university. It came into being on 31 January, with the adoption by Parliament of Act 1 of 1964. The first academic year commenced on 1 March 1965. Initially situated in a series of buildings on Bird Street, in the historic Central district, UPE moved to a modern, purpose-built campus – incorporating residences, a sports complex and the towering Main Building in Summerstrand in 1974. The campus was officially opened in August 1975, and the final move from Bird Street came in 1979 with the opening of the science blocks at Summerstrand. The university retained some of its Bird Street buildings and these became the centre of community outreach activities.

Built on 830 ha of land donated by the Port Elizabeth City Council, the campus was declared a nature reserve in 1983.

At the time of the merger, UPE had more than 9 000 contact students and almost 5 000 distance education students. The last Chancellor was Brigalia Bam, the last Vice-Chancellor Prof Nthabiseng Ogude and the last Chair of Council Mr Trevor Jennings.

=== Vista University ===
Vista was founded in 1981. The Port Elizabeth campus was built in 1982. Subsequently, seven decentralised contact tuition campuses were established, centred on township areas where the need for accessible and affordable higher education was most urgent. In 1982 the Port Elizabeth campus consisted of a small, prefabricated building patched between the national road to Uitenhage and the edge of Zwide township. Its location opened up access to higher education for many students from socially and financially disadvantaged backgrounds.

The campus had its first academic year in 1983, and in 1991 a permanent brick structure was completed. Later additions, such as the Conference Hall and Arena, provided accessible facilities for the surrounding community for large events. With seating for 5 000, the Arena is the Eastern Cape's largest indoor venue.

Initially focused on the upgrading of teachers through its Education Faculty, in its subsequent growth Vista far surpassed the narrow field of expertise cut out for it, producing graduates in business, law, science and the humanities.

At the time of the merger, Vista PE had approximately 2 000 students and was led by Acting Campus Principal Prof Miemie Struwig. with its first academic year in 1983. It was taken over by UPE.

== Governance and administration ==
The ceremonial head of the university is the chancellor, who, in the name of the university, confers all qualifications. The vice-chancellor is responsible for the day-to-day running of the university. Deputy vice-chancellors for research, innovation and internationalisation, learning and teaching, people and operations as well as the registrar, acting as the secretary to the university's council, assist the vice-chancellor in her duties. There is an executive dean for each faculty, as well as learning and teaching. Other management committee positions are the dean of students, and campus principals for the Missionvale and George campuses.

The current chancellor is Naledi Pandor, appointed in 2026. The current vice-chancellor is Sibongile Muthwa, who was appointed in 2017. Dr Kaluke Mawila is the campus principal at George Campus and the current Missionvale campus principal is Phakama Ntshongwana.

== Campuses ==
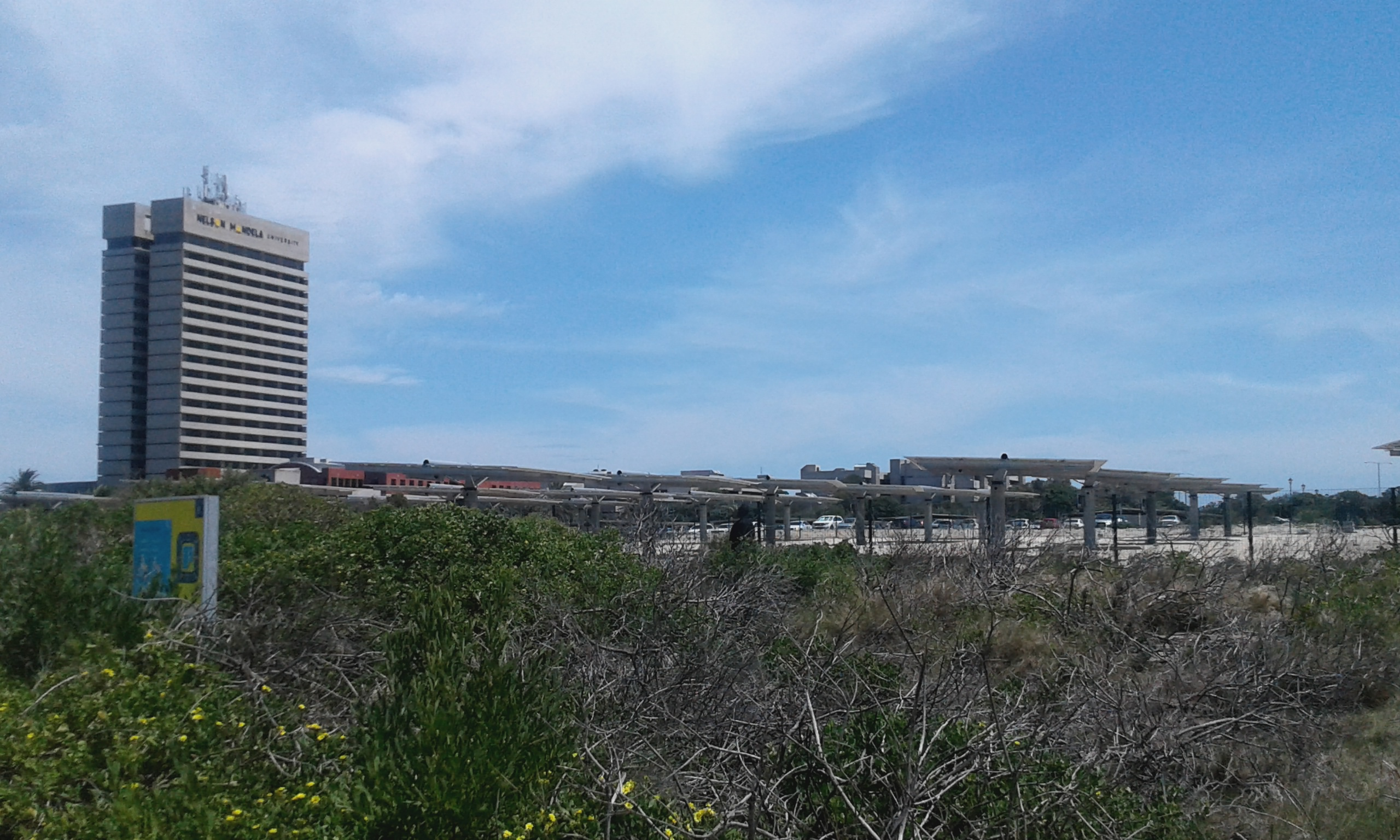
South Campus

The university currently has seven campuses. Six of them are located in Gqeberha, and one is in George. The South, North, Second Avenue and Ocean Sciences campuses are all situated in Summerstrand, Gqeberha close to the beach.

- The South Campus is the main campus of Mandela University, having previously been used by UPE. It was built on 830 hectares (2,100 acres) of land donated by the then Port Elizabeth City Council and completed in 1965, the campus was declared a nature reserve in 1983. It is the only university campus in South Africa to be situated on a nature reserve and the only university to offer game drives on its campus.
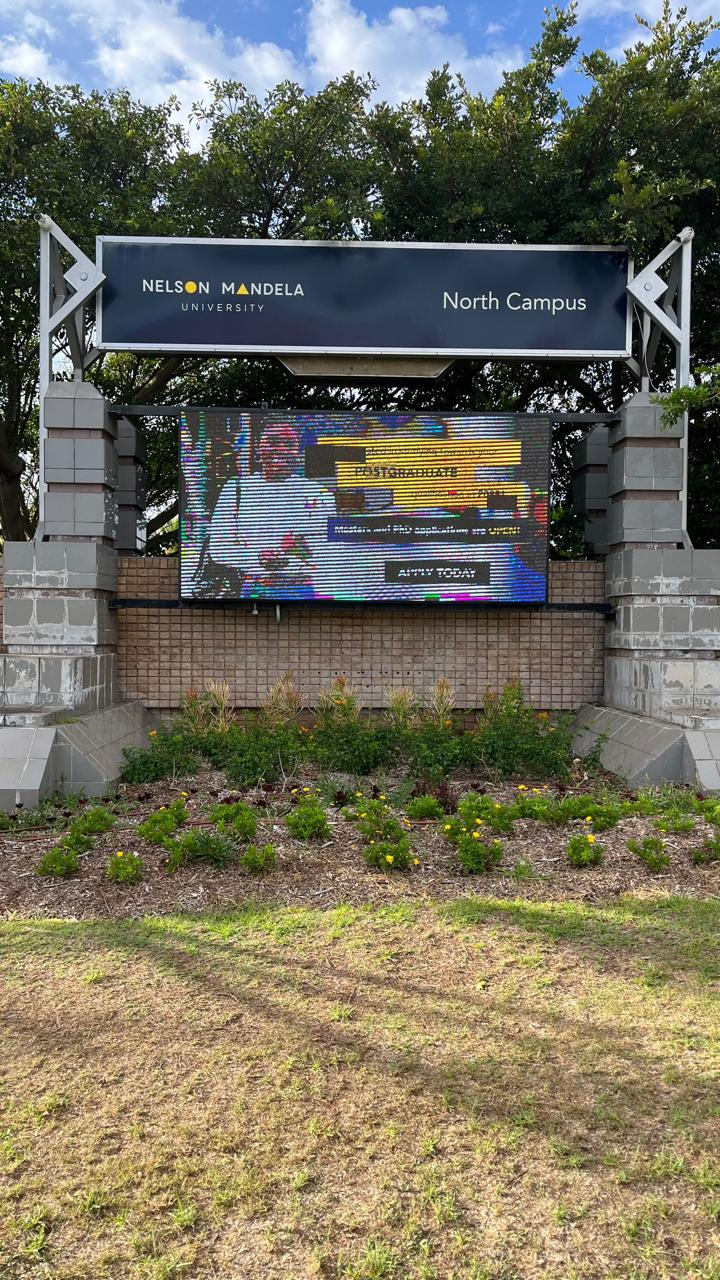
- Nelson Mandela University North Campus
  The North Campus is located adjacent to the South Campus. It was the main campus of PE Technikon before the merger.
- The 2nd Avenue Campus was the PE Technikon's College Campus and is now used for various diploma programs. It houses the university's Business School as well as the Archives and Exhibition Centre.
- The Missionvale Campus is located between Gqeberha and Uitenhage. It was the Port Elizabeth campus of Vista University. The Indoor Sport Centre is the Eastern Cape's largest indoor venue with seating for 4000 people. Also the campus for South Africa's 10th medical school opened in 2020.
- The Bird Street Campus was used by Rhodes University, prior to becoming the initial campus of the University of Port Elizabeth in the 1960s. It is located in PE's central business district. It was home to the university's business school but has subsequently become the university's art hub, housing an art gallery.
- The George Campus is located 8 km outside the city centre (between George and Knysna) and specializes in environmental studies, particularity forestry, nature conservation and game ranch management.

== Students and staff ==
In 2020 there were approximately 28,000 students enrolled at the university.

Student Enrollment at Nelson Mandela Metropolitan University
Year	African	%	Coloured	%	White	%	Indian	%	Total
2021	22,314	78%	2,910	10%	2,972	10%	295	1%	28,491
2022	26,281	83%	2,682	8%	2,467	8%	317	1%	31,747
2023	26,569	85%	2,320	7%	2,192	7%	319	1%	31,400
2024	26,956	87%	2,029	7%	1,730	5%	310	1%	31,025
2025	29,282	88%	2,044	6%	1,688	5%	339	1%	33,353

== Notable alumni and staff ==
- Nashwa Eassa, nano-particle physicist
- Dave Richardson, ICC general manager and former Proteas cricket player
- Paul Treu, rugby coach
- André Vos, former Springbok captain
- Eben Venter, award-winning Afrikaans novelist and master's graduate
- Garth Wright, former Springbok rugby player
- Amber Anderson, HR executive at Coca-Cola Fortune
- Laduma Ngxokolo, fashion designer and businessman, MaXhosa founder
