= 2017 Rugby Challenge =

- Countries: South Africa; Namibia
- Date: 22 April – 16 July 2017
- Champions: Western Province (1st title)
- Runners-up: Griquas
- Matches played: 67
- Tries scored: 617 (average 9.2 per match)
- Top point scorer: Shaun Reynolds, Golden Lions XV (138)
- Top try scorer: Enver Brandt, Griquas and Frank Herne, Pumas (9)

The 2017 Rugby Challenge – known as the SuperSport Rugby Challenge for sponsorship reasons – was the first edition of the Rugby Challenge, the secondary domestic rugby union competition in South Africa, and intended to be the long-term successor of the Vodacom Cup competition. The competition was organised by the South African Rugby Union and was played between 22 April and 16 July 2017. The competition featured all fourteen South African provincial unions plus Namibian side the Welwitschias.

The competition was won by Western Province, after they beat Griquas 28–19 in the final in Cape Town. Golden Lions XV fly-half Shaun Reynolds was the top scorer in the competition with 138 points, while Griquas wing Enver Brandt and Pumas hooker Frank Herne were the joint top try scorer with 9 tries. Danie Debeer was the man of the match.

== Competition rules and information ==
The fifteen teams in the competition were divided into three regional pools of five teams. Each team will play home and away matches against the other four teams in their pool over a ten-week period. The top two teams from each pool, along with the two third-placed teams with the best record will progress to the play-offs, which will consist of quarter finals, a semi-final and a final.

== Teams ==
The teams that will compete in the 2017 Rugby Challenge are:

Location of teams in the 2017 Rugby Challenge
Northern Section
Central Section
Southern Section

Northern Section
Team	Sponsored Name
Blue Bulls XV	Vodacom Blue Bulls XV
Falcons	Hino Valke
Golden Lions XV	Xerox Golden Lions XV
Pumas	Steval Pumas
Welwitschias	Windhoek Draught Welwitschias

Central Section
Team	Sponsored Name
Free State XV	Toyota Free State XV
Griffons	Down Touch Griffons
Griquas	Tafel Lager Griquas
Leopards	Leopards
Sharks XV	Cell C Sharks XV

Southern Section
Team	Sponsored Name
Boland Cavaliers	Boland Cavaliers
Border Bulldogs	Border Bulldogs
Eastern Province Kings	Eastern Province Kings
SWD Eagles	SWD Eagles
Western Province	DHL Western Province

== Northern Section ==
=== Log ===
Northern Section log
Pos	Team	P	W	D	L	PF	PA	PD	TF	TA	TB	LB	Pts
1	Golden Lions XV	8	7	0	1	485	208	+277	69	26	7	1	36
2	Blue Bulls XV	8	5	0	3	376	240	+136	53	33	7	2	29
3	Pumas	8	5	1	2	314	217	+97	44	27	7	0	29
4	Falcons	8	1	1	6	273	386	−113	39	56	7	3	16
5	Welwitschias	8	1	0	7	140	537	−397	19	82	2	0	6

- The Golden Lions XV and the Blue Bulls XV qualified for the quarterfinals as section winners and runners-up respectively. The Pumas also qualified as a best third-placed team.

=== Round-by-round ===
The table below shows each team's progression throughout the season. For each round, each team's cumulative points total is shown with the overall log position in brackets.

Team Progression – Northern Section
Team	R1	R2	R3	R4	R5	R6	R7	R8	R9	R10	QF	SF	F
Golden Lions XV	0 (4th)	5 (3rd)	10 (1st)	14 (1st)	16 (1st)	16 (3rd)	21 (2nd)	26 (2nd)	31 (1st)	36 (1st)	Won	Lost	—N/a
Blue Bulls XV	0 (5th)	5 (1st)	10 (2nd)	10 (2nd)	15 (2nd)	17 (2nd)	22 (1st)	27 (1st)	27 (2nd)	29 (2nd)	Won	Lost	—N/a
Pumas	5 (2nd)	5 (4th)	5 (4th)	10 (3rd)	13 (3rd)	18 (1st)	19 (3rd)	19 (3rd)	24 (3rd)	29 (3rd)	Lost	—N/a	—N/a
Falcons	5 (1st)	5 (2nd)	6 (3rd)	7 (4th)	10 (4th)	12 (4th)	12 (4th)	14 (4th)	15 (4th)	16 (4th)	—N/a	—N/a	—N/a
Welwitschias	1 (3rd)	1 (5th)	1 (5th)	1 (5th)	1 (5th)	6 (5th)	6 (5th)	6 (5th)	6 (5th)	6 (5th)	—N/a	—N/a	—N/a
Key:	win	draw	loss	bye									

=== Matches ===
==== Round One ====
22 April 2017	Blue Bulls XV	23–31	Pumas	Loftus Versfeld, Pretoria
14:30	Try: Rabz Maxwane; Divan Rossouw; Con: Tinus de Beer; Tony Jantjies; Pen: Joshua Stander; Tony Jantjies (2)	Scoreboard	Try: Marko Janse van Rensburg; Frank Herne (2); Devon Williams; Con: Kobus Marais; Pen: Kobus Marais (3)	Referee: Jaco van Heerden

22 April 2017	Falcons	50–33	Welwitschias	Barnard Stadium, Kempton Park
15:00	Try: Dian Koen; Ernst Ladendorf; Etienne Taljaard (2); Grant Janke; Keaton Gordon; Maphutha Dolo; Con: Warren Potgieter (6); Pen: Warren Potgieter	Scoreboard	Try: Max Katjijeko; Leneve Damens; Eugene Jantjies; Gino Wilson; Lesley Klim; Con: Theuns Kotzé; Pen: Theuns Kotzé (2)	Referee: Quinton Immelman

Bye/s: Golden Lions XV

==== Round Two ====
29 April 2017	Pumas	29–40	Golden Lions XV	KaNyamazane Stadium, Nelspruit
15:00	Try: Reynier van Rooyen (2); Con: Kobus Marais (2); Pen: Kobus Marais (5)	Scoreboard	Try: Fabian Booysen (2); Shaun Reynolds; Gerrie Labuschagné; Con: Shaun Reynolds (4); Pen: Shaun Reynolds (4)	Referee: Cwengile Jadezweni

29 April 2017	Welwitschias	25–50	Blue Bulls XV	Hage Geingob Stadium, Windhoek
16:00	Try: JC Greyling; David Philander; Andries Rousseau; Con: Theuns Kotzé (2); Pen: Theuns Kotzé (2)	Scoreboard	Try: Andrew Beerwinkel; Clyde Davids; Ivan van Zyl (3); Jade Stighling; Divan Rossouw; Eduan Lubbe; Con: Tony Jantjies (5)	Referee: Pro Legoete

Bye/s: Falcons

==== Round Three ====
6 May 2017	Blue Bulls XV	63–26	Falcons	Loftus Versfeld, Pretoria
14:30	Try: Rabz Maxwane (3); Franco Naudé; Shaun Adendorff; Boom Prinsloo (2) penalty try (2); Con: Tony Jantjies (7)	Scoreboard	Try: Andries Schutte; Dian Koen; Etienne Taljaard; Maphutha Dolo; Con: Warren Potgieter (3)	Referee: Pro Legoete

6 May 2017	Golden Lions XV	112–14	Welwitschias	Alberton Rugby Club, Alberton
15:00	Try: JP du Preez (3); James Venter (2); Victor Sekekete; Shaun Reynolds; Madosh Tambwe; Gerdus van der Walt; Jarryd Sage (2); Hacjivah Dayimani (3); Siya Masuku; Selom Gavor; Con: Shaun Reynolds (7); Siya Masuku (9)	Scoreboard	Try: Lesley Klim (2); Con: Theuns Kotzé (2)	Referee: Ben Crouse

Bye/s: Pumas

==== Round Four ====
14 May 2017	Pumas	64–8	Welwitschias	Bill Jardine Stadium, Johannesburg
13:00	Try: Frank Herne; Brian Shabangu; Carel Greeff; Kobus Marais; Ryan Nell; Ruwellyn Isbell (2); Devon Williams; Emile Temperman; Sias Ebersohn; Con: Kobus Marais (3); Sias Ebersohn (4)	Scoreboard	Try: Lesley Klim; Pen: Theuns Kotzé	Referee: Cwengile Jadezweni

14 May 2017	Golden Lions XV	28–27	Falcons	Bill Jardine Stadium, Johannesburg
15:00	Try: Pieter Jansen (2); James Venter; Con: Siya Masuku (2); Pen: Siya Masuku; Shaun Reynolds (2)	Scoreboard	Try: Jan Enslin; Friedle Olivier penalty try Con: Christian Rust (2); Pen: Christian Rust (2)	Referee: Egon Seconds

Bye/s: Blue Bulls XV

==== Round Five ====
20 May 2017	Golden Lions XV	35–37	Blue Bulls XV	Ellis Park Stadium, Johannesburg
14:35	Try: Jano Venter; Shaun Reynolds; Selom Gavor; Jarryd Sage; Ashlon Davids; Con: Shaun Reynolds (2); Pen: Shaun Reynolds (2)	Scoreboard	Try: Corniel Els; Boom Prinsloo; Tinus de Beer; Arno Botha penalty try Con: Tinus de Beer (2); Pen: Tinus de Beer (2)	Referee: AJ Jacobs

20 May 2017	Falcons	41–41	Pumas	Bosman Stadium, Brakpan
15:00	Try: Andries Schutte; Shane Kirkwood (2); Friedle Olivier; Marnus Erasmus; Con: Warren Potgieter (3); Christian Rust (2); Pen: Warren Potgieter (2)	Scoreboard	Try: De-Jay Terblanche; Frank Herne; Carel Greeff (2); JP Lewis; Ruwellyn Isbell; Devon Williams; Con: Sias Ebersohn (3)	Referee: Marius van der Westhuizen

Bye/s: Welwitschias

==== Round Six ====
27 May 2017	Pumas	35–29	Blue Bulls XV	Mbombela Stadium, Mbombela
15:00	Try: Marko Janse van Rensburg; Ryan Nell; Hennie Skorbinski; Frank Herne; Con: Kobus Marais (3); Pen: Kobus Marais (3)	Scoreboard	Try: Franco Naudé; Shaun Adendorff (2) penalty try Con: Tinus de Beer (2); Pen: Joshua Stander	Referee: Pro Legoete

27 May 2017	Welwitschias	45–43	Falcons	Hage Geingob Stadium, Windhoek
16:00	Try: Roderique Victor; Gino Wilson (2); JC Greyling; Lesley Klim; David Philander; Con: Theuns Kotzé (6); Pen: Theuns Kotzé	Scoreboard	Try: Shane Kirkwood (2); Johan Pretorius (2); Etienne Taljaard; Grant Janke; Reg Muller; Con: Christian Rust (4)	Referee: Stephan Geldenhuys

Bye/s: Golden Lions XV

==== Round Seven ====
2 June 2017	Golden Lions XV	35–25	Pumas	Ellis Park Stadium, Johannesburg
14:00	Try: Fabian Booysen; Jano Venter; Shaun Reynolds; Aphiwe Dyantyi (2); Con: Shaun Reynolds (5)	Scoreboard	Try: Marko Janse van Rensburg; JP Lewis; Ryan Nell; Frank Herne; Con: Sias Ebersohn; Pen: Sias Ebersohn	Referee: Quinton Immelman

3 June 2017	Blue Bulls XV	92–7	Welwitschias	Hoërskool Garsfontein, Pretoria
13:30	Try: Shaun Adendorff (2); Boom Prinsloo (2); Clyde Davids; Kefentse Mahlo (2); Franco Naudé (3); Brian Leitch; André Warner (2); Earll Douwrie; Con: Tinus de Beer (6); Joshua Stander (5)	Scoreboard	Try: Nikin Cloete; Con: Dirk von Weidts	Referee: Egon Seconds

Bye/s: Falcons

==== Round Eight ====
9 June 2017	Falcons	26–33	Blue Bulls XV	Barnard Stadium, Kempton Park
15:00	Try: Marco Klopper; JP Mostert; Warren Potgieter; Etienne Taljaard; Con: Warren Potgieter (3)	Scoreboard	Try: Boom Prinsloo; André Warner; Kefentse Mahlo (2); Duncan Matthews; Con: Tinus de Beer; Handré Pollard (3)	Referee: AJ Jacobs

10 June 2017	Welwitschias	0–84	Golden Lions XV	Hage Geingob Stadium, Windhoek
16:00		Scoreboard	Try: Bobby de Wee (2); James Venter (2); Hacjivah Dayimani (2); Jano Venter; Gerrie Labuschagné (3); Gerdus van der Walt; Selom Gavor; Driaan Bester; Morné van den Berg; Con: Siya Masuku (7)	Referee: Pro Legoete

Bye/s: Pumas

==== Round Nine ====
16 June 2017	Falcons	27–96	Golden Lions XV	Barnard Stadium, Kempton Park
14:30	Try: Marco Klopper; Reg Muller; Maphutha Dolo (2); Con: Christian Rust (2); Pen: Christian Rust	Scoreboard	Try: Akker van der Merwe (2); Marvin Orie; Fabian Booysen; Jano Venter (2); Dillon Smit; Madosh Tambwe; Jacques Nel; Anthony Volmink (3); Hacjivah Dayimani; Jan-Louis la Grange; Con: Shaun Reynolds (13)	Referee: Lourens van der Merwe

17 June 2017	Welwitschias	8–42	Pumas	Hage Geingob Stadium, Windhoek
14:00	Try: Dirk von Weidts; Pen: Winmar Rust	Scoreboard	Try: Emile Temperman; JP Lewis; Carel Greeff (2); Francois Kleinhans; Jannie Stander; Con: Kobus Marais (3); Sias Ebersohn (3)	Referee: Ben Crouse

Bye/s: Blue Bulls XV

==== Round Ten ====
23 June 2017	Blue Bulls XV	49–55	Golden Lions XV	Orlando Stadium, Soweto
17:00	Try: Pierre Schoeman; Jaco Visagie; André Warner; Dries Swanepoel; Duncan Matthews penalty try Con: Tian Schoeman (4); Pen: Tian Schoeman (3)	Scoreboard	Try: Jacques van Rooyen; Akker van der Merwe; Lourens Erasmus; Marvin Orie; Madosh Tambwe (2); Kwagga Smith penalty try Con: Shaun Reynolds (5); Pen: Shaun Reynolds	Referee: Stuart Berry

24 June 2017	Pumas	47–33	Falcons	Mbombela Stadium, Mbombela
15:00	Try: Frank Herne; Francois Kleinhans; Emile Temperman; Ruwellyn Isbell; Ryan Nell; Hennie Skorbinski penalty try Con: Sias Ebersohn (3); Justin van Staden (2)	Scoreboard	Try: Dwight Pansegrouw; Anrich Richter; Etienne Taljaard; Christian Rust (2); Con: Christian Rust (4)	Referee: Cwengile Jadezweni

Bye/s: Welwitschias

== Central Section ==
=== Log ===
Central Section log
Pos	Team	P	W	D	L	PF	PA	PD	TF	TA	TB	LB	Pts
1	Griquas	8	6	1	1	335	213	+122	47	30	8	1	35
2	Sharks XV	8	5	1	2	288	150	+138	43	19	6	1	29
3	Free State XV	8	3	0	5	253	301	−48	32	40	6	4	22
4	Leopards	8	3	0	5	199	276	−77	27	39	4	1	17
5	Griffons	8	2	0	6	227	362	−135	32	53	4	1	13

- Griquas and the Sharks XV qualified for the quarterfinals as section winners and runners-up respectively. The Free State XV also qualified as a best third-placed team.

=== Round-by-round ===
The table below shows each team's progression throughout the season. For each round, each team's cumulative points total is shown with the overall log position in brackets.

Team Progression – Central Section
Team	R1	R2	R3	R4	R5	R6	R7	R8	R9	R10	QF	SF	F
Griquas	5 (1st)	7 (2nd)	7 (2nd)	12 (2nd)	17 (1st)	22 (1st)	22 (1st)	27 (1st)	30 (1st)	35 (1st)	Won	Won	Lost
Sharks XV	0 (5th)	0 (5th)	5 (3rd)	10 (3rd)	11 (3rd)	11 (4th)	16 (3rd)	21 (2nd)	24 (2nd)	29 (2nd)	Lost	—N/a	—N/a
Free State XV	0 (3rd)	2 (4th)	4 (5th)	6 (4th)	10 (4th)	15 (2nd)	20 (2nd)	21 (3rd)	21 (3rd)	22 (3rd)	Lost	—N/a	—N/a
Leopards	5 (2nd)	10 (1st)	15 (1st)	15 (1st)	15 (2nd)	15 (3rd)	17 (4th)	17 (4th)	17 (4th)	17 (4th)	—N/a	—N/a	—N/a
Griffons	0 (4th)	5 (3rd)	5 (4th)	5 (5th)	5 (5th)	7 (5th)	7 (5th)	7 (5th)	12 (5th)	13 (5th)	—N/a	—N/a	—N/a
Key:	win	draw	loss	bye									

=== Matches ===
==== Round One ====
22 April 2017	Griffons	17–29	Leopards	North West Stadium, Welkom
15:00	Try: Khwezi Mkhafu; Henco Greyling; Neil Claassen; Con: Jaun Kotzé	Scoreboard	Try: Loftus Morrison; Schalk Hugo; Gene Willemse (2); Con: Schalk Hugo (3); Pen: Schalk Hugo	Referee: Pro Legoete

22 April 2017	Sharks XV	7–28	Griquas	Kings Park Stadium, Durban
17:00	Try: Juan Schoeman; Con: Johan Deysel	Scoreboard	Try: Jason Fraser; Tertius Kruger; Enver Brandt penalty try Con: George Whitehead (2); André Swarts	Referee: Stuart Berry

Bye/s: Free State XV

==== Round Two ====
29 April 2017	Free State XV	36–38	Griffons	Free State Stadium, Bloemfontein
14:30	Try: Rayno Benjamin; JW Jonker; Luther Obi; Michael van der Spuy; Heinrich Bitzi; Con: Heinrich Bitzi (4); Pen: Heinrich Bitzi	Scoreboard	Try: Louis Venter; Vuyo Mbotho (2); Joubert Engelbrecht; Alrin Eksteen; Con: Duan Pretorius (3); Jaun Kotzé (2); Pen: Duan Pretorius	Referee: Ben Crouse

29 April 2017	Griquas	35–38	Leopards	Diamantveld High School, Kimberley
15:00	Try: Wendal Wehr; Christiaan Meyer; George Whitehead; Ederies Arendse; Enver Brandt; Con: George Whitehead (5)	Scoreboard	Try: Boela Venter; Gideon van der Merwe; Marno Redelinghuys; Rowayne Beukman; Tapiwa Mafura; Con: Schalk Hugo (5); Pen: Schalk Hugo	Referee: Quinton Immelman

Bye/s: Sharks XV

==== Round Three ====
5 May 2017	Leopards	37–32	Free State XV	Olën Park, Potchefstroom
18:00	Try: Marno Redelinghuys; Schalk Hugo; Gene Willemse (2); Con: Schalk Hugo (4); Pen: Schalk Hugo (3)	Scoreboard	Try: Justin Basson; Rayno Benjamin; Ntokozo Vidima; Stephan Kotzé; Con: Heinrich Bitzi (2); Marco Mason; Pen: Heinrich Bitzi (2)	Referee: Quinton Immelman

6 May 2017	Griffons	24–52	Sharks XV	North West Stadium, Welkom
15:00	Try: Alrin Eksteen; Tertius Maarman; Vuyo Mbotho; Con: Duan Pretorius (3); Pen: Duan Pretorius	Scoreboard	Try: Hyron Andrews; Jacques Vermeulen; Morné Joubert; Garth April (2); Tristan Blewett penalty try (2); Con: Garth April (4)	Referee: Lourens van der Merwe

Bye/s: Griquas

==== Round Four ====
12 May 2017	Free State XV	30–32	Griquas	Free State Stadium, Bloemfontein
15:00	Try: Joseph Dweba; Junior Pokomela; JW Jonker; Gerhard Olivier; Con: Marco Mason (2); Pen: Marco Mason (2)	Scoreboard	Try: Enver Brandt; Tertius Kruger; Ederies Arendse; Renier Botha; Con: George Whitehead (3); Pen: George Whitehead (2)	Referee: Quinton Immelman

13 May 2017	Sharks XV	32–5	Leopards	Douglas Mitchell Sports Grounds, Uvongo
15:00	Try: John-Hubert Meyer; Jacques Vermeulen (3); Kerron van Vuuren; Con: Benhard Janse van Rensburg (2); Pen: Benhard Janse van Rensburg	Scoreboard	Try: Tapiwa Mafura	Referee: Lourens van der Merwe

Bye/s: Griffons

==== Round Five ====
20 May 2017	Sharks XV	19–21	Free State XV	Ashton International College, Ballito
15:00	Try: Hyron Andrews (2); Pen: Courtney Winnaar (3)	Scoreboard	Try: Tienie Burger; Marco Mason; Con: Marco Mason; Pen: Marco Mason (3)	Referee: Stuart Berry

20 May 2017	Griffons	22–66	Griquas	North West Stadium, Welkom
15:30	Try: Danie van der Merwe; Joubert Engelbrecht; Thato Mavundla; Con: Duan Pretorius (2); Pen: Duan Pretorius	Scoreboard	Try: AJ le Roux; Shaun McDonald; Christiaan Meyer; Tertius Kruger (2); Kyle Steyn; Koch Marx; Eric Zana; André Swarts; AJ Coertzen; Con: George Whitehead (5); Eric Zana (3)	Referee: Lourens van der Merwe

Bye/s: Leopards

==== Round Six ====
28 May 2017	Griffons	48–53	Free State XV	Rustenburg Impala Rugby Club, Rustenburg
12:30	Try: Jasper Wiese; Warren Williams (3); Joubert Engelbrecht; Rodney Damons; Neil Claassen; Con: Duan Pretorius (5); Pen: Robbie Petzer	Scoreboard	Try: Michael van der Spuy; Luther Obi (2); Ali Mgijima (2); JW Jonker; Ntokozo Vidima; Con: Marco Mason (6); Pen: Marco Mason (2)	Referee: Jaco Pretorius

28 May 2017	Leopards	17–54	Griquas	Rustenburg Impala Rugby Club, Rustenburg
14:30	Try: Juan Language; Jeandré Rudolph; Elden Schoeman; Con: Schalk Hugo	Scoreboard	Try: Jason Fraser (2); Renier Botha; André Swarts; AJ Coertzen; Tertius Kruger; Alvin Brandt; Con: André Swarts (5); Pen: André Swarts (3)	Referee: AJ Jacobs

Bye/s: Sharks XV

==== Round Seven ====
2 June 2017	Free State XV	35–32	Leopards	Free State Stadium, Bloemfontein
15:00	Try: Joseph Dweba; Stephan Janse van Rensburg; JW Jonker; Marco Mason; Con: Marco Mason (3); Pen: Marco Mason (3)	Scoreboard	Try: Gideon van der Merwe (3); Henko Marais; Con: Gerhard Nortier (2); Schalk Hugo; Pen: Gerhard Nortier (2)	Referee: AJ Jacobs

3 June 2017	Sharks XV	60–10	Griffons	Sugar Ray Xulu Stadium, Clermont
15:00	Try: Khaya Majola; Marius Louw; S'bura Sithole (2); Odwa Ndungane (3); Courtney Winnaar; Tristan Blewett; Con: Benhard Janse van Rensburg (3); Danrich Visagie (3); Pen: Benhard Janse van Rensburg	Scoreboard	Try: Jasper Wiese; Con: Duan Pretorius; Pen: Duan Pretorius	Referee: Pro Legoete

Bye/s: Griquas

==== Round Eight ====
9 June 2017	Griquas	43–36	Free State XV	Griqua Park, Kimberley
19:00	Try: Wendal Wehr (2); Renier Botha; André Swarts; Ederies Arendse (2); Con: André Swarts (5); Pen: André Swarts	Scoreboard	Try: Justin Basson; JW Jonker; Luther Obi (2); Ruan van Rensburg; Con: Marco Mason (4); Pen: Marco Mason	Referee: Stuart Berry

10 June 2017	Leopards	24–38	Sharks XV	Olën Park, Potchefstroom
15:00	Try: Joe Smith; Henko Marais (2); Con: Gerhard Nortier (2); Schalk Hugo; Pen: Gerhard Nortier	Scoreboard	Try: Stephan Coetzee; Khaya Majola; Andrew du Plessis; André Esterhuizen (2); Wian Vosloo; Con: Garth April (4)	Referee: Rasta Rasivhenge

Bye/s: Griffons

==== Round Nine ====
15 June 2017	Griquas	28–28	Sharks XV	Griqua Park, Kimberley
19:00	Try: AJ le Roux; Jason Fraser; Renier Botha (2); Con: George Whitehead; André Swarts (3)	Scoreboard	Try: Hyron Andrews; S'bura Sithole; Ilunga Mukendi; Garth April; Con: Garth April; Pen: Garth April (2)	Referee: AJ Jacobs

16 June 2017	Leopards	17–33	Griffons	Olën Park, Potchefstroom
18:00	Try: HP Swart; Jimmy Mpailane; Tapiwa Mafura; Con: Gerhard Nortier	Scoreboard	Try: Barend Potgieter; Thato Mavundla; Jasper Wiese; Duan Pretorius; Carel-Jan Coetzee; Con: Duan Pretorius (4)	Referee: Jaco Pretorius

Bye/s: Free State XV

==== Round Ten ====
23 June 2017	Free State XV	10–52	Sharks XV	Free State Stadium, Bloemfontein
15:00	Try: Joseph Dweba; Con: Marco Mason; Pen: Michael van der Spuy	Scoreboard	Try: Stephan Coetzee; Etienne Oosthuizen; Philip van der Walt; Dan du Preez; Cobus Reinach (2); André Esterhuizen; S'bura Sithole; Con: Garth April (6)	Referee: AJ Jacobs

23 June 2017	Griquas	49–35	Griffons	Griqua Park, Kimberley
15:00	Try: Christiaan Meyer; Enver Brandt (2); Tertius Kruger; Koch Marx; Eric Zana; Wilmar Arnoldi; Con: George Whitehead (7)	Scoreboard	Try: Louis Venter; Carel-Jan Coetzee; Vuyo Mbotho (2); Alrin Eksteen; Con: Wynand Pienaar (2); Pen: Duan Pretorius (2)	Referee: Vusi Msibi

Bye/s: Leopards

== Southern Section ==
=== Log ===
Southern Section log
Pos	Team	P	W	D	L	PF	PA	PD	TF	TA	TB	LB	Pts
1	Western Province	8	8	0	0	312	171	+141	46	23	7	0	39
2	Eastern Province Kings	8	5	0	3	235	222	+13	35	30	4	1	25
3	Border Bulldogs	8	4	0	4	215	264	−49	29	37	4	2	22
4	Boland Cavaliers	8	3	0	5	193	198	−5	24	28	4	2	18
5	SWD Eagles	8	0	0	8	183	283	−100	25	41	3	6	9

- Western Province and the Eastern Province Kings qualified for the quarterfinals as section winners and runners-up respectively.

=== Round-by-round ===
The table below shows each team's progression throughout the season. For each round, each team's cumulative points total is shown with the overall log position in brackets.

Team Progression – Southern Section
Team	R1	R2	R3	R4	R5	R6	R7	R8	R9	R10	QF	SF	F
Western Province	5 (1st)	10 (1st)	15 (1st)	15 (1st)	20 (1st)	25 (1st)	30 (1st)	34 (1st)	34 (1st)	39 (1st)	Won	Won	Won
Eastern Province Kings	0 (5th)	5 (3rd)	5 (3rd)	6 (4th)	11 (3rd)	11 (4th)	15 (3rd)	15 (3rd)	20 (3rd)	25 (3rd)	Lost	—N/a	—N/a
Border Bulldogs	5 (2nd)	6 (2nd)	11 (2nd)	15 (2nd)	15 (2nd)	16 (2nd)	16 (2nd)	20 (2nd)	22 (2nd)	22 (3rd)	—N/a	—N/a	—N/a
Boland Cavaliers	2 (3rd)	2 (4th)	4 (5th)	8 (3rd)	8 (4th)	12 (3rd)	12 (4th)	12 (4th)	17 (4th)	18 (4th)	—N/a	—N/a	—N/a
SWD Eagles	0 (4th)	2 (5th)	4 (4th)	5 (5th)	5 (5th)	5 (5th)	6 (5th)	7 (5th)	7 (5th)	9 (5th)	—N/a	—N/a	—N/a
Key:	win	draw	loss	bye									

=== Matches ===
==== Round One ====
23 April 2017	Border Bulldogs	28–25	Boland Cavaliers	Wolfson Stadium, KwaZakele
13:00	Try: Blake Kyd; Michael Makase; Sonwabiso Mqalo penalty try Con: Oliver Zono (3)	Scoreboard	Try: Marlyn Williams; Zandré Jordaan; Danwel Demas; Charlie Mayeza; Con: Elgar Watts; Pen: Elgar Watts	Referee: Cwengile Jadezweni

23 April 2017	Eastern Province Kings	18–30	Western Province	Wolfson Stadium, KwaZakele
15:00	Try: Stefan Ungerer; Alshaun Bock; Siyanda Grey; Pen: Garrick Mattheus	Scoreboard	Try: Luke Stringer; Jaco Coetzee; Valentino Wellman; Grant Hermanus; Con: Brandon Thomson (2); Pen: Brandon Thomson (2)	Referee: Rodney Boneparte

Bye/s: SWD Eagles

==== Round Two ====
28 April 2017	SWD Eagles	29–34	Eastern Province Kings	Outeniqua Park, George
19:00	Try: Leighton Eksteen; Lodewyk Uys; Johnny Welthagen penalty try Con: Leighton Eksteen (2); Pen: Leighton Eksteen	Scoreboard	Try: Thembelani Bholi; Neil Maritz; Keanu Vers; Waylon Murray penalty try Con: Simon Bolze (2); Pen: Simon Bolze	Referee: Stuart Berry

29 April 2017	Western Province	50–34	Border Bulldogs	City Park Stadium, Athlone
16:00	Try: Chad Solomon; Brenden Esterhuizen; Johan du Toit; Scott van Breda (2); Michal Haznar; Valentino Wellman; Con: Brandon Thomson (6); Pen: Brandon Thomson	Scoreboard	Try: Bangi Kobese; Oliver Zono (2); Soso Xakalashe; Con: Oliver Zono (4); Pen: Oliver Zono (2)	Referee: Rasta Rasivhenge

Bye/s: Boland Cavaliers

==== Round Three ====
5 May 2017	Border Bulldogs	42–38	SWD Eagles	Buffalo City Stadium, East London
19:15	Try: Wandile Putuma; Lukhanyo Nomzanga; Johannes Janse van Rensburg; Soso Xakalashe; Michael Makase; Ntabeni Dukisa; Con: Oliver Zono (5); Bangi Kobese	Scoreboard	Try: Christo du Plessis; Quaid Langeveldt; Adri Jacobs (2); Jan van der Merwe; Daniël Maree; Con: Leighton Eksteen (4)	Referee: Stuart Berry

6 May 2017	Boland Cavaliers	28–35	Western Province	Velddrif Rugby Club, Velddrif
15:00	Try: Rinus Bothma; Christopher Bosch; Chadley Wenn; Sergio Torrens; Con: Divan Nel; Pen: Divan Nel (2)	Scoreboard	Try: Dean Muir; Ruben de Villiers; Eduard Zandberg; Scott van Breda; Valentino Wellman; Con: Brandon Thomson (5)	Referee: Egon Seconds

Bye/s: Eastern Province Kings

==== Round Four ====
12 May 2017	SWD Eagles	8–15	Boland Cavaliers	Outeniqua Park, George
19:00	Try: Johnny Welthagen; Pen: Leighton Eksteen	Scoreboard	Pen: Divan Nel (5)	Referee: Pro Legoete

13 May 2017	Eastern Province Kings	17–20	Border Bulldogs	Nelson Mandela Bay Stadium, Port Elizabeth
14:30	Try: Greg Jackson; Brandon Brown; Stefan Ungerer; Con: Garrick Mattheus	Scoreboard	Try: Johannes Janse van Rensburg; Michael Makase; Ntabeni Dukisa; Con: Oliver Zono; Pen: Oliver Zono	Referee: AJ Jacobs

Bye/s: Western Province

==== Round Five ====
19 May 2017	Western Province	45–11	SWD Eagles	Newlands Stadium, Cape Town
16:15	Try: Chad Solomon (2); Craig Barry (2); Grant Hermanus; Justin Phillips penalty try Con: Grant Hermanus (4)	Scoreboard	Try: Charles Radebe; Pen: Leighton Eksteen (2)	Referee: Cwengile Jadezweni

20 May 2017	Eastern Province Kings	27–16	Boland Cavaliers	Nelson Mandela Bay Stadium, Port Elizabeth
16:45	Try: Lupumlo Mguca; Simon Bolze; Sonwabo Majola; Con: Simon Bolze (3); Pen: Simon Bolze (2)	Scoreboard	Try: Clemen Lewis; Con: Divan Nel; Pen: Divan Nel (3)	Referee: Egon Seconds

Bye/s: Border Bulldogs

==== Round Six ====
27 May 2017	Boland Cavaliers	21–20	Border Bulldogs	Ceres Rugby Club, Ceres
15:00	Try: Sergio Torrens; Divan Nel; Con: Divan Nel; Pen: Divan Nel (3)	Scoreboard	Try: Soso Xakalashe; Sino Nyoka; Oliver Zono; Con: Oliver Zono; Pen: Oliver Zono	Referee: Vusi Msibi

27 May 2017	Western Province	39–24	Eastern Province Kings	City Park Stadium, Athlone
15:00	Try: Chad Solomon; Jaco Coetzee; Marcello Sampson; Khanyo Ngcukana; Craig Barry (2); Con: Brandon Thomson (3); Pen: Brandon Thomson	Scoreboard	Try: Michael Brink; Wandile Mjekevu; Siyanda Grey; Con: Garrick Mattheus (3); Pen: Garrick Mattheus	Referee: Ben Crouse

Bye/s: SWD Eagles

==== Round Seven ====
4 June 2017	Eastern Province Kings	24–21	SWD Eagles	Sisa Dukashe Stadium, Mdantsane
13:00	Try: Chris Heiberg; Tango Balekile; Keanu Vers (2); Con: Pieter-Steyn de Wet (2)	Scoreboard	Try: Thor Halvorsen; Johnny Welthagen; Marlo Weich; Con: Leighton Eksteen (3)	Referee: Cwengile Jadezweni

4 June 2017	Border Bulldogs	7–45	Western Province	Sisa Dukashe Stadium, Mdantsane
15:00	Try: Oliver Zono; Con: Oliver Zono	Scoreboard	Try: Dean Muir; Brenden Esterhuizen; Johan du Toit; Jaco Coetzee; Craig Barry; Grant Hermanus; Con: Brandon Thomson (6); Pen: Brandon Thomson	Referee: AJ Jacobs

Bye/s: Boland Cavaliers

==== Round Eight ====
9 June 2017	SWD Eagles	25–26	Border Bulldogs	Outeniqua Park, George
19:00	Try: Freginald Africa; Marlou van Niekerk; Adri Jacobs; Con: Leighton Eksteen (2); Pen: Leighton Eksteen (2)	Scoreboard	Try: Oliver Zono (2); Sino Nyoka; Con: Oliver Zono; Pen: Oliver Zono (3)	Referee: Cwengile Jadezweni

10 June 2017	Western Province	22–8	Boland Cavaliers	Charles Morkel Stadium, Strand
15:00	Try: Eital Bredenkamp; Kurt Coleman; Michal Haznar; Con: Kurt Coleman (2); Pen: Kurt Coleman	Scoreboard	Try: Clinton Theron; Pen: Divan Nel	Referee: Quinton Immelman

Bye/s: Eastern Province Kings

==== Round Nine ====
15 June 2017	Border Bulldogs	38–43	Eastern Province Kings	Buffalo City Stadium, East London
17:00	Try: Oliver Zono; Michael Makase; Sonwabiso Mqalo; Lelethu Gcilitshana (2); Con: Oliver Zono (5); Pen: Oliver Zono	Scoreboard	Try: Tango Balekile; Stefan Willemse; Brandon Brown; Stefan Ungerer; Sonwabo Majola; Neil Maritz; Con: Pieter-Steyn de Wet (5); Pen: Pieter-Steyn de Wet	Referee: Cwengile Jadezweni

17 June 2017	Boland Cavaliers	51–10	SWD Eagles	Alfa Sports Ground, Malmesbury
15:00	Try: Clinton Theron; Ludio Williams; Zandré Jordaan; Elgar Watts (2); Sergio Torrens; Edwin Sass; Charlie Mayeza; Con: Divan Nel (3); Adriaan Carelse; Pen: Divan Nel	Scoreboard	Try: Dillin Snel; Con: Leighton Eksteen; Pen: Leighton Eksteen	Referee: Pro Legoete

Bye/s: Western Province

==== Round Ten ====
24 June 2017	Boland Cavaliers	29–48	Eastern Province Kings	Glaskasteel, Bredasdorp
15:00	Try: Vian van der Watt; Edwin Sass; Gerrit van Wyk; Mac Muller; Con: Divan Nel (3); Pen: Divan Nel	Scoreboard	Try: Mike Willemse; Keanu Vers (2); Neil Maritz (3); Malcolm Jaer; Tango Balekile; Con: Pieter-Steyn de Wet (4)	Referee: Quinton Immelman

25 June 2017	SWD Eagles	41–46	Western Province	Bridgton Sports Grounds, Oudtshoorn
15:00	Try: Kirsten Heyns; Teunis Nieuwoudt; Adri Jacobs; Lodewyk Uys; Dillin Snel; Quaid Langeveldt; Con: Leighton Eksteen (4); Pen: Leighton Eksteen	Scoreboard	Try: Eduard Zandberg; Nyasha Tarusenga; Bjorn Basson; Marcello Sampson (2); Craig Barry (3); Con: Brandon Thomson (2); Errol Jaggers	Referee: Rasta Rasivhenge

Bye/s: Border Bulldogs

== Title play-offs ==
The final pool standings and title play-offs seeding were:

Section winners
Seeding	Team	Section	PD	Pts
1	Western Province	Southern Section	39	+141
2	Golden Lions XV	Northern Section	36	+277
3	Griquas	Central Section	35	+122
Section runners-up
Seeding	Team	Section	PD	Pts
4	Sharks XV	Central Section	29	+138
5	Blue Bulls XV	Northern Section	29	+136
6	Eastern Province Kings	Southern Section	25	+13
Section third-placed teams
Seeding	Team	Section	PD	Pts
7	Pumas	Northern Section	29	+97
8	Free State XV	Central Section	22	−48
9	Border Bulldogs	Southern Section	22	−49

=== Quarterfinals ===
1 July 2017	Golden Lions XV	43–32	Pumas	Ellis Park Stadium, Johannesburg
14:00	Try: James Venter (2); Dillon Smit; Jarryd Sage (2); Madosh Tambwe; Con: Shaun Reynolds (5); Pen: Shaun Reynolds	Scoreboard	Try: Nardus van der Walt; Frank Herne (2); Reynier van Rooyen; Con: Kobus Marais (2); Justin van Staden; Pen: Kobus Marais; Justin van Staden	Referee: Rasta Rasivhenge

1 July 2017	Griquas	73–41	Eastern Province Kings	Griqua Park, Kimberley
15:00	Try: AJ le Roux; Sias Koen; Enver Brandt (4); Koch Marx; Ederies Arendse; Eric Zana; Marius Fourie; Christiaan Meyer; Con: George Whitehead (9)	Scoreboard	Try: Sintu Manjezi; Brandon Brown; Lusanda Badiyana; Sonwabo Majola; Keanu Vers; SF Nieuwoudt; Con: Pieter-Steyn de Wet (3); Garrick Mattheus; Pen: Pieter-Steyn de Wet	Referee: AJ Jacobs

2 July 2017	Sharks XV	18–23	Blue Bulls XV	Green Point Track, Cape Town
12:45	Try: Wian Vosloo; Ilunga Mukendi; Courtney Winnaar; Pen: Benhard Janse van Rensburg	Scoreboard	Try: Aston Fortuin; Andrew Beerwinkel; Con: Joshua Stander (2); Pen: Tinus de Beer (3)	Referee: Quinton Immelman

2 July 2017	Western Province	26–0	Free State XV	Green Point Track, Cape Town
15:00	Try: Bjorn Basson; Michal Haznar; Con: Brandon Thomson (2); Pen: Kurt Coleman (3); Brandon Thomson	Scoreboard		Referee: Pro Legoete

=== Semifinals ===
9 July 2017	Golden Lions XV	21–33	Griquas	Sisa Dukashe Stadium, Mdantsane
12:45	Try: James Venter; Madosh Tambwe (2); Con: Shaun Reynolds (3)	Scoreboard	Try: Ewald van der Westhuizen; Sias Koen; Ederies Arendse; Con: George Whitehead (3); Pen: George Whitehead (2); André Swarts	Referee: Cwengile Jadezweni

9 July 2017	Western Province	28–24	Blue Bulls XV	Sisa Dukashe Stadium, Mdantsane
15:00	Try: Luke Stringer; Jaco Coetzee; Godlen Masimla; Con: Kurt Coleman (2); Pen: Kurt Coleman (3)	Scoreboard	Try: Dries Swanepoel; Dewald Naudé; Franco Naudé; Con: Joshua Stander (3); Pen: Joshua Stander	Referee: AJ Jacobs

=== Final ===
16 July 2017	Western Province	28–19	Griquas	Florida Park, Parow
14:30	Try: Jurie van Vuuren; Bjorn Basson; Marcello Sampson (2); Con: Kurt Coleman (4)	Scoreboard	Try: Tertius Kruger; Koch Marx; NJ Oosthuizen; Con: André Swarts (2)	Referee: Egon Seconds

== Honours ==
The honour roll for the 2017 Rugby Challenge was as follows:

2017 Rugby Challenge
Champions:	Western Province (1st title)
Top points scorer:	Shaun Reynolds, Golden Lions XV (138)
Top try scorers:	Enver Brandt, Griquas; Frank Herne, Pumas (9)

== Players ==
=== Squads ===
The following squads were named for the 2018 Rugby Challenge:

Blue Bulls XV
Name	PMA	WEL	GFA	LIO	PMA	WEL	GFA	LIO	SHA	WPr	F	App	Try	Con	Pen	DG	Pts
Njabulo Gumede	1	1	1	1	1		17 (substituted on)		1	1	—N/a	8	0	0	0	0	0
Edgar Marutlulle	2		2		2						—N/a	3	0	0	0	0	0
Andrew Beerwinkel	3	3		17 (substituted on)	17 (substituted on)	1	1	17 (substituted on)	17 (substituted on)	17 (substituted on)	—N/a	9	2	0	0	0	10
Freddy Ngoza	4	4	7						18 (substituted on)	4	—N/a	5	0	0	0	0	0
Aston Fortuin	5	5		5	5	5	5	18 (substituted on)	5	5	—N/a	9	1	0	0	0	5
Marco van Staden	6	6	19 (substituted on)	19 (substituted on)	19 (substituted on)	19 (substituted on)	19 (substituted on)		6	6	—N/a	9	0	0	0	0	0
Abongile Nonkontwana	7	7	5			4	4	4	7	7	—N/a	8	0	0	0	0	0
Renaldo Bothma	8										—N/a	1	0	0	0	0	0
Ivan van Zyl	9	9	9					20 (substituted on)	9	9	—N/a	6	3	0	0	0	15
Tony Jantjies	10	10	10								—N/a	3	0	13	2	0	32
Rabz Maxwane	11	11	11				14	11			—N/a	5	4	0	0	0	20
Joshua Stander	12	21 (substituted on)	12	21 (substituted on)	21 (substituted on)	21 (substituted on)			21 (substituted on)	10	—N/a	8	0	10	3	0	29
Divan Rossouw	13	15	22 (substituted on)	22 (substituted on)	15	13	22 (substituted on)	22 (substituted on)	11		—N/a	9	2	0	0	0	10
Jade Stighling	14	14	14					14			—N/a	4	1	0	0	0	5
Duncan Matthews	15	22 (substituted on)		14		15	15	15			—N/a	6	2	0	0	0	10
Corniel Els	16 (substituted on)	2	16 (substituted on)	2	16 (substituted on)						—N/a	5	1	0	0	0	5
Ig Prinsloo	17 (substituted on)										—N/a	1	0	0	0	0	0
Brian Leitch	18 (substituted on)	18 (substituted on)	4	4	4	18 (substituted on)					—N/a	6	1	0	0	0	5
Clyde Davids	19 (substituted on)	8		8	8	8	8		8	8	—N/a	8	2	0	0	0	10
André Warner	20 (substituted on)			9	9	20 (substituted on)	9	9			—N/a	6	4	0	0	0	20
Tinus de Beer	21 (substituted on)			10	10	10	21 (substituted on)	21 (substituted on)	10		—N/a	7	1	12	5	0	44
Kefentse Mahlo	22 (substituted on)			11	11	11	11			11	—N/a	6	4	0	0	0	20
Franco Naudé		12	21 (substituted on)		12	12	12		22 (substituted on)	22 (substituted on)	—N/a	7	6	0	0	0	30
Ulrich Beyers		13	15	15							—N/a	3	0	0	0	0	0
Alandré van Rooyen		16 (substituted on)		16 (substituted on)		2	2	16 (substituted on)	2	2	—N/a	7	0	0	0	0	0
Matthys Basson		17 (substituted on)									—N/a	1	0	0	0	0	0
Eduan Lubbe		19 (substituted on)									—N/a	1	1	0	0	0	5
Theo Maree		20 (substituted on)	20 (substituted on)	20	20 (substituted on)	9	20		20 (substituted on)	20 (substituted on)	—N/a	6	0	0	0	0	0
Martin Dreyer			3			17 (substituted on)					—N/a	2	0	0	0	0	0
Shaun Adendorff			6		6	6	6	19 (substituted on)			—N/a	5	5	0	0	0	25
Boom Prinsloo			8	6	7	7	7	8			—N/a	6	6	0	0	0	30
Johnny Kôtze			13	13	13						—N/a	3	0	0	0	0	0
Conraad van Vuuren			17 (substituted on)								—N/a	1	0	0	0	0	0
Marius Verwey			18 (substituted on)	18 (substituted on)	18 (substituted on)		18			18 (substituted on)	—N/a	4	0	0	0	0	0
Jacobie Adriaanse				3							—N/a	1	0	0	0	0	0
Arno Botha				7							—N/a	1	1	0	0	0	5
JT Jackson				12					12	12	—N/a	3	0	0	0	0	0
John-Roy Jenkinson					3	3	3	3			—N/a	4	0	0	0	0	0
Dewald Naudé					14	14			14	14	—N/a	4	1	0	0	0	5
Marquit September					22 (substituted on)						—N/a	1	0	0	0	0	0
Jan-Henning Campher						16 (substituted on)	16 (substituted on)		16 (substituted on)	16 (substituted on)	—N/a	4	0	0	0	0	0
Earll Douwrie						22 (substituted on)					—N/a	1	1	0	0	0	5
Handré Pollard							10				—N/a	1	0	3	0	0	6
Dries Swanepoel							13	13	13	13	—N/a	4	2	0	0	0	10
Pierre Schoeman								1			—N/a	1	1	0	0	0	5
Jaco Visagie								2			—N/a	1	1	0	0	0	5
RG Snyman								5			—N/a	1	0	0	0	0	0
Ruan Steenkamp								6			—N/a	1	0	0	0	0	0
Jannes Kirsten								7			—N/a	1	0	0	0	0	0
Tian Schoeman								10			—N/a	1	0	4	3	0	17
Burger Odendaal								12			—N/a	1	0	0	0	0	0
Neethling Fouché									3	3	—N/a	2	0	0	0	0	0
Ruben van Heerden									4		—N/a	1	0	0	0	0	0
Manie Libbok									15	15	—N/a	2	0	0	0	0	0
Roelof Smit									19 (substituted on)		—N/a	1	0	0	0	0	0
Luigy van Jaarsveld										19 (substituted on)	—N/a	1	0	0	0	0	0
Kurt Webster										21	—N/a	0	0	0	0	0	0
penalty try												–	5	–	–	–	35
Total												10	58	42	13	0	423
Francois Brummer, JD Fourie, Arnold Gerber, Xolisa Guma, Boeta Hamman, Andell Loubser, Madot Mabokela, Adrian Maebane, Simphiwe Matanzima, Nico Peyper, Ryno Pieterse, JT Potgieter, PJ Toerien, Jan van der Merwe and Dylan van der Walt were named in the squad, but not included in a matchday squad.

Boland Cavaliers
Name	BDR	WPr	SWD	EPK	BDR	WPr	SWD	EPK	QF	SF	F	App	Try	Con	Pen	DG	Pts
Linda Thwala	1	1	1			17 (substituted on)	17 (substituted on)	17 (substituted on)	—N/a	—N/a	—N/a	6	0	0	0	0	0
Chadley Wenn	2	16 (substituted on)	16	16 (substituted on)	16 (substituted on)	16 (substituted on)	16 (substituted on)	16 (substituted on)	—N/a	—N/a	—N/a	7	1	0	0	0	5
Clinton Theron	3	3	3	3	3	3	3	3	—N/a	—N/a	—N/a	8	2	0	0	0	10
Marlyn Williams	4	4	4		4	4	4	4	—N/a	—N/a	—N/a	7	1	0	0	0	5
Rinus Bothma	5	5	5	5	5	5	5		—N/a	—N/a	—N/a	7	1	0	0	0	5
Kenan Cronjé	6	6	6	6	6			18 (substituted on)	—N/a	—N/a	—N/a	6	0	0	0	0	0
Wayne Wilschut	7	7	7	7	19 (substituted on)	8	6	6	—N/a	—N/a	—N/a	8	0	0	0	0	0
Zandré Jordaan	8	8	8	8	8		8	8	—N/a	—N/a	—N/a	7	2	0	0	0	10
Freddie Muller	9	9		20 (substituted on)					—N/a	—N/a	—N/a	3	0	0	0	0	0
Elgar Watts	10	10			10	21 (substituted on)	10	10	—N/a	—N/a	—N/a	6	2	1	1	0	15
Danwel Demas	11	11						22 (substituted on)	—N/a	—N/a	—N/a	3	1	0	0	0	5
Christopher Bosch	12	12	12	12	13				—N/a	—N/a	—N/a	5	1	0	0	0	5
Alcino Izaacs	13	13	13	13	22 (substituted on)	13	22 (substituted on)		—N/a	—N/a	—N/a	7	0	0	0	0	0
Charlie Mayeza	14	14	14			14	14	14	—N/a	—N/a	—N/a	6	2	0	0	0	10
Adriaan Carelse	15		10	10	21 (substituted on)		21 (substituted on)	21 (substituted on)	—N/a	—N/a	—N/a	6	0	1	0	0	2
Mac Muller	16 (substituted on)						19 (substituted on)	19 (substituted on)	—N/a	—N/a	—N/a	3	1	0	0	0	5
Ian Oosthuizen	17 (substituted on)								—N/a	—N/a	—N/a	1	0	0	0	0	0
Dylan Pieterse	18 (substituted on)	18 (substituted on)	18 (substituted on)	4		7			—N/a	—N/a	—N/a	5	0	0	0	0	0
Gareth Cilliers	19 (substituted on)			19 (substituted on)		6			—N/a	—N/a	—N/a	3	0	0	0	0	0
Vian van der Watt	20 (substituted on)	20 (substituted on)	9		9	9	9	9	—N/a	—N/a	—N/a	7	1	0	0	0	5
JP Coetzee	21 (substituted on)		21		14	15			—N/a	—N/a	—N/a	3	0	0	0	0	0
Logan Basson	22 (substituted on)	22 (substituted on)		11					—N/a	—N/a	—N/a	3	0	0	0	0	0
Clemen Lewis		2	2	2	2	2	2	2	—N/a	—N/a	—N/a	7	1	0	0	0	5
Divan Nel		15	15	15	15	10	15	15	—N/a	—N/a	—N/a	7	1	9	16	0	71
Arnout Malherbe		17 (substituted on)	17 (substituted on)	1	1	1	1	1	—N/a	—N/a	—N/a	7	0	0	0	0	0
Ludio Williams		19 (substituted on)	19		7	19 (substituted on)	7	7	—N/a	—N/a	—N/a	5	1	0	0	0	5
Sergio Torrens		21 (substituted on)	11	14	11	11	11	11	—N/a	—N/a	—N/a	7	3	0	0	0	15
Jovelian de Koker			20 (substituted on)	9	20 (substituted on)	20 (substituted on)	20 (substituted on)	20 (substituted on)	—N/a	—N/a	—N/a	6	0	0	0	0	0
Edwin Sass			22	22 (substituted on)	12	12	12	12	—N/a	—N/a	—N/a	5	2	0	0	0	10
Yves Bashiya				18 (substituted on)	18 (substituted on)	18 (substituted on)	18 (substituted on)	5	—N/a	—N/a	—N/a	5	0	0	0	0	0
Vukile Sofisa				17 (substituted on)	17 (substituted on)				—N/a	—N/a	—N/a	2	0	0	0	0	0
Gerrit van Wyk				21		22 (substituted on)	13	13	—N/a	—N/a	—N/a	3	1	0	0	0	5
Total												8	24	11	17	0	193
Francois Esterhuyzen, Stefaan Grundlingh, Francois Hanekom, Chris Massyn and Chaney Willemse were named in the squad, but not included in a matchday squad.

Border Bulldogs
Name	BOL	WPr	SWD	EPK	BOL	WPr	SWD	EPK	QF	SF	F	App	Try	Con	Pen	DG	Pts
Blake Kyd	1	1		1	1	1	1	1	—N/a	—N/a	—N/a	7	1	0	0	0	5
Mihlali Mpafi	2	2	2	2	2	2	2	2	—N/a	—N/a	—N/a	8	0	0	0	0	0
Phumlani Blaauw	3	17 (substituted on)	3		18 (substituted on)		3	3	—N/a	—N/a	—N/a	6	0	0	0	0	0
Lindokuhle Welemu	4	4	19 (substituted on)	4	4	4	4	4	—N/a	—N/a	—N/a	8	0	0	0	0	0
Hendri Storm	5	5	4	18 (substituted on)	19 (substituted on)	5	18 (substituted on)	18 (substituted on)	—N/a	—N/a	—N/a	8	0	0	0	0	0
Lukhanyo Nomzanga	6	19 (substituted on)	6	19 (substituted on)		19 (substituted on)	6	6	—N/a	—N/a	—N/a	7	1	0	0	0	5
Siya Mdaka	7	6		6	6		7		—N/a	—N/a	—N/a	5	0	0	0	0	0
Johannes Janse van Rensburg	8	7	7	7	7	7	19 (substituted on)	7	—N/a	—N/a	—N/a	8	2	0	0	0	10
Bangi Kobese	9	9	20 (substituted on)	20 (substituted on)	20 (substituted on)	9	9		—N/a	—N/a	—N/a	7	1	1	0	0	7
Oliver Zono	10	10	10	10	10	10	10	10	—N/a	—N/a	—N/a	8	7	21	8	0	101
Sipho Nofemele	11								—N/a	—N/a	—N/a	1	0	0	0	0	0
Lunga Dumezweni	12	12	12	12	22 (substituted on)	12	12	12	—N/a	—N/a	—N/a	8	0	0	0	0	0
Lundi Ralarala	13	13	13	13	13	13			—N/a	—N/a	—N/a	6	0	0	0	0	0
Michael Makase	14	14	14	14	14	14	14	14	—N/a	—N/a	—N/a	8	4	0	0	0	20
Sonwabiso Mqalo	15	15	11	11	15	15	15	15	—N/a	—N/a	—N/a	8	2	0	0	0	10
Josh Kota	16 (substituted on)		16 (substituted on)	16 (substituted on)	16 (substituted on)				—N/a	—N/a	—N/a	4	0	0	0	0	0
Luzuko Nyabaza	17 (substituted on)	3	18 (substituted on)				16 (substituted on)		—N/a	—N/a	—N/a	4	0	0	0	0	0
Siyamthanda Ngande	18 (substituted on)	16 (substituted on)	1						—N/a	—N/a	—N/a	3	0	0	0	0	0
Soso Xakalashe	19 (substituted on)	8	8	8	8	8		19 (substituted on)	—N/a	—N/a	—N/a	7	3	0	0	0	15
Sino Nyoka	20 (substituted on)	20 (substituted on)	9	9	9		20 (substituted on)	9	—N/a	—N/a	—N/a	7	2	0	0	0	10
Saneliso Ngoma	21 (substituted on)								—N/a	—N/a	—N/a	1	0	0	0	0	0
Sethu Tom	22 (substituted on)	22 (substituted on)	22 (substituted on)	22 (substituted on)			13	13	—N/a	—N/a	—N/a	6	0	0	0	0	0
Lelethu Gcilitshana		11					22 (substituted on)	11	—N/a	—N/a	—N/a	3	2	0	0	0	10
Wandile Putuma		18 (substituted on)	5	5	5		5	5	—N/a	—N/a	—N/a	6	1	0	0	0	5
Ntabeni Dukisa		21 (substituted on)	15	15					—N/a	—N/a	—N/a	3	2	0	0	0	10
Yanga Xakalashe			17 (substituted on)	17 (substituted on)	17 (substituted on)	17 (substituted on)	17 (substituted on)		—N/a	—N/a	—N/a	5	0	0	0	0	0
Billy Dutton			21 (substituted on)				8	8	—N/a	—N/a	—N/a	3	0	0	0	0	0
Lwando Mabenge				3	3	3		17 (substituted on)	—N/a	—N/a	—N/a	4	0	0	0	0	0
Siya Ncanywa				21 (substituted on)	11	11	11		—N/a	—N/a	—N/a	4	0	0	0	0	0
Somila Mantyoyi					12	22 (substituted on)		22 (substituted on)	—N/a	—N/a	—N/a	3	0	0	0	0	0
Onke Dubase					21 (substituted on)	6			—N/a	—N/a	—N/a	2	0	0	0	0	0
Ludwe Booi						16 (substituted on)		16 (substituted on)	—N/a	—N/a	—N/a	2	0	0	0	0	0
Athenkosi Khethani						18 (substituted on)			—N/a	—N/a	—N/a	1	0	0	0	0	0
Reinhardt Engelbrecht						20 (substituted on)		20 (substituted on)	—N/a	—N/a	—N/a	2	0	0	0	0	0
Nkululeko Ndlovu						21 (substituted on)	21 (substituted on)	21	—N/a	—N/a	—N/a	2	0	0	0	0	0
penalty try												–	1	–	–	–	7
Total												8	29	22	8	0	215
Masixole Banda, Athenkosi Manentsa, Thabiso Mngomezulu, Nkosi Nofuma and Ayabonga Nomboyo were named in the squad, but not included in a matchday squad.

Eastern Province Kings
Name	WPr	SWD	BDR	BOL	WPr	SWD	BDR	BOL	QF	SF	F	App	Try	Con	Pen	DG	Pts
Dewald Barnard	1	1	1							—N/a	—N/a	3	0	0	0	0	0
Tango Balekile	2	2	16 (substituted on)	16 (substituted on)	2	2	2	16 (substituted on)	2	—N/a	—N/a	9	3	0	0	0	15
Johan van Wyk	3									—N/a	—N/a	1	0	0	0	0	0
Stefan Willemse	4						7		7	—N/a	—N/a	3	1	0	0	0	5
Giant Mtyanda	5	5				5		4		—N/a	—N/a	4	0	0	0	0	0
Brandon Brown	6	6	6			19 (substituted on)	8	6	6	—N/a	—N/a	7	3	0	0	0	15
Thembelani Bholi	7	7	7				18 (substituted on)	7		—N/a	—N/a	5	1	0	0	0	5
Lusanda Badiyana	8	8	8	8	8	8		19 (substituted on)	8	—N/a	—N/a	8	1	0	0	0	5
Stefan Ungerer	9	9	9	9			9	20		—N/a	—N/a	5	3	0	0	0	15
Garrick Mattheus	10	21 (substituted on)	21 (substituted on)	21 (substituted on)	10	21	21 (substituted on)		21 (substituted on)	—N/a	—N/a	7	0	5	2	0	16
Alshaun Bock	11	11								—N/a	—N/a	2	1	0	0	0	5
Neil Maritz	12	13	13	12			14	14	14	—N/a	—N/a	7	5	0	0	0	25
Siyanda Grey	13			13	22 (substituted on)	22 (substituted on)				—N/a	—N/a	4	2	0	0	0	10
Jixie Molapo	14									—N/a	—N/a	1	0	0	0	0	0
Chrysander Botha	15	15			15					—N/a	—N/a	3	0	0	0	0	0
JP Jamieson	16 (substituted on)									—N/a	—N/a	1	0	0	0	0	0
Roché van Zyl	17 (substituted on)	17 (substituted on)					17 (substituted on)	3	3	—N/a	—N/a	5	0	0	0	0	0
Sintu Manjezi	18 (substituted on)	18 (substituted on)	4						4	—N/a	—N/a	4	1	0	0	0	5
Christiaan de Bruin	19 (substituted on)	4								—N/a	—N/a	2	0	0	0	0	0
Rouche Nel	20 (substituted on)	20 (substituted on)	22 (substituted on)	14		20 (substituted on)	22 (substituted on)		20 (substituted on)	—N/a	—N/a	7	0	0	0	0	0
Simon Bolze	21 (substituted on)	10	10	10	14				22 (substituted on)	—N/a	—N/a	6	1	5	3	0	24
Keanu Vers	22 (substituted on)	14	14	15	11	15	15	11	15	—N/a	—N/a	9	6	0	0	0	30
Chris Heiberg		3			17 (substituted on)	1	3	17 (substituted on)		—N/a	—N/a	5	1	0	0	0	5
Johann Tromp		12	15							—N/a	—N/a	2	0	0	0	0	0
Greg Jackson		16 (substituted on)	2	2	16 (substituted on)					—N/a	—N/a	4	1	0	0	0	5
Wynand Grassmann		19 (substituted on)	19 (substituted on)	4	4	18 (substituted on)				—N/a	—N/a	5	0	0	0	0	0
Waylon Murray		22 (substituted on)	12					21 (substituted on)	12	—N/a	—N/a	4	0	0	0	0	0
Khona Dabula			3							—N/a	—N/a	1	0	0	0	0	0
Mzwanele Zito			5		5		4	18 (substituted on)		—N/a	—N/a	4	0	0	0	0	0
Sonwabo Majola			11	11	20 (substituted on)	14	11		11	—N/a	—N/a	6	3	0	0	0	15
Lupumlo Mguca			17 (substituted on)	3	3	3			17 (substituted on)	—N/a	—N/a	5	1	0	0	0	5
Kevin Kaba			18 (substituted on)	7	7	7			18 (substituted on)	—N/a	—N/a	5	0	0	0	0	0
Ricky Schroeder			20 (substituted on)	20 (substituted on)	9	9			9	—N/a	—N/a	5	0	0	0	0	0
Xandré Vos				1	1	17 (substituted on)	1	1	1	—N/a	—N/a	6	0	0	0	0	0
Wihan Coetzer				5						—N/a	—N/a	1	0	0	0	0	0
SF Nieuwoudt				6	6	6	6		19 (substituted on)	—N/a	—N/a	5	1	0	0	0	5
Sive Mazosiwe				17 (substituted on)						—N/a	—N/a	1	0	0	0	0	0
Rob Lyons				18 (substituted on)	19 (substituted on)					—N/a	—N/a	2	0	0	0	0	0
Hayden Tharratt				19 (substituted on)						—N/a	—N/a	1	0	0	0	0	0
Athi Mayinje				22 (substituted on)	21 (substituted on)	11				—N/a	—N/a	3	0	0	0	0	0
Michael Brink					12	12	12			—N/a	—N/a	3	1	0	0	0	5
Wandile Mjekevu					13	13		13		—N/a	—N/a	3	1	0	0	0	5
Cameron Lindsay					18 (substituted on)	4	5	5	5	—N/a	—N/a	5	0	0	0	0	0
Pieter-Steyn de Wet						10	10	10	10	—N/a	—N/a	4	0	14	2	0	34
Robin Stevens						16 (substituted on)			16 (substituted on)	—N/a	—N/a	2	0	0	0	0	0
Stokkies Hanekom							13	22 (substituted on)	13	—N/a	—N/a	3	0	0	0	0	0
Mike Willemse							16 (substituted on)	2		—N/a	—N/a	2	1	0	0	0	5
Zingisa April							19			—N/a	—N/a	0	0	0	0	0	0
Rudi van Rooyen							20 (substituted on)	9		—N/a	—N/a	2	0	0	0	0	0
Tyler Paul								8		—N/a	—N/a	1	0	0	0	0	0
Berton Klaasen								12		—N/a	—N/a	1	0	0	0	0	0
Malcolm Jaer								15		—N/a	—N/a	1	1	0	0	0	5
penalty try												–	1	–	–	–	7
Total												9	40	24	7	0	271
Matt Howes, Vaughen Isaacs, Thapelo Molapo, Sibusiso Ngcokovane, Mabhutana Peter and Janse Roux were named in the squad, but not included in a matchday squad.

Falcons
Name	WEL	BUL	LIO	PMA	WEL	BUL	LIO	PMA	QF	SF	F	App	Try	Con	Pen	DG	Pts
Koos Strauss	1	1			1		17 (substituted on)		—N/a	—N/a	—N/a	4	0	0	0	0	0
Jan Enslin	2	2	2	16 (substituted on)	16 (substituted on)	16 (substituted on)	16 (substituted on)		—N/a	—N/a	—N/a	7	1	0	0	0	5
Andries Schutte	3	3	3	3	3	3	3	1	—N/a	—N/a	—N/a	8	2	0	0	0	10
Shane Kirkwood	4	4	4	4	4	4	4	4	—N/a	—N/a	—N/a	8	4	0	0	0	20
JP Mostert	5	5	5	5	5	5	5	5	—N/a	—N/a	—N/a	8	1	0	0	0	5
Dian Koen	6	6	6	6	6				—N/a	—N/a	—N/a	5	2	0	0	0	10
Ernst Ladendorf	7	7	7	7	7	7	7		—N/a	—N/a	—N/a	7	1	0	0	0	5
Friedle Olivier	8	8	8	8	8	8	19 (substituted on)		—N/a	—N/a	—N/a	7	2	0	0	0	10
Anrich Richter	9	9	9	9	14	20 (substituted on)	9	9	—N/a	—N/a	—N/a	8	1	0	0	0	5
Warren Potgieter	10	10		10		10	21 (substituted on)		—N/a	—N/a	—N/a	5	1	15	3	0	44
Etienne Taljaard	11	11	11	11	11	11		11	—N/a	—N/a	—N/a	7	6	0	0	0	30
Xander Cronjé	12	12			21				—N/a	—N/a	—N/a	2	0	0	0	0	0
Andries Truter	13	15	13	13					—N/a	—N/a	—N/a	4	0	0	0	0	0
Grant Janke	14	13	12	12	13	12	12	12	—N/a	—N/a	—N/a	8	2	0	0	0	10
Keaton Gordon	15		14			14	14	22 (substituted on)	—N/a	—N/a	—N/a	5	1	0	0	0	5
Gihard Visagie	16 (substituted on)					17 (substituted on)		3	—N/a	—N/a	—N/a	3	0	0	0	0	0
Henri Boshoff	17 (substituted on)	17 (substituted on)	1	1		1	1	16 (substituted on)	—N/a	—N/a	—N/a	7	0	0	0	0	0
Thabo Mamojele	18 (substituted on)	19 (substituted on)						7	—N/a	—N/a	—N/a	3	0	0	0	0	0
Marnus Erasmus	19 (substituted on)	18 (substituted on)	18 (substituted on)	18 (substituted on)	18 (substituted on)				—N/a	—N/a	—N/a	5	1	0	0	0	5
Johan Pretorius	20 (substituted on)	20	20 (substituted on)	20	9	9	20 (substituted on)	20 (substituted on)	—N/a	—N/a	—N/a	6	2	0	0	0	10
Maphutha Dolo	21 (substituted on)	14					11		—N/a	—N/a	—N/a	3	4	0	0	0	20
Reg Muller	22 (substituted on)		19 (substituted on)		20 (substituted on)	19 (substituted on)	8	8	—N/a	—N/a	—N/a	6	2	0	0	0	10
Marco Klopper		16 (substituted on)	16 (substituted on)	2	2	2	2	2	—N/a	—N/a	—N/a	7	2	0	0	0	10
Ruan Allerston		21 (substituted on)	10		10	21		10	—N/a	—N/a	—N/a	4	0	0	0	0	0
Don Mlondobozi		22 (substituted on)	22 (substituted on)	14				14	—N/a	—N/a	—N/a	4	0	0	0	0	0
Christian Rust			15	15	15	22 (substituted on)	10	13	—N/a	—N/a	—N/a	6	2	14	3	0	47
Tiaan Weyers			17 (substituted on)	17 (substituted on)	17 (substituted on)			17 (substituted on)	—N/a	—N/a	—N/a	4	0	0	0	0	0
Cameron Rooi			21 (substituted on)	22 (substituted on)	22 (substituted on)	13	22 (substituted on)	21 (substituted on)	—N/a	—N/a	—N/a	6	0	0	0	0	0
Dwight Pansegrouw				19 (substituted on)	19 (substituted on)	6	6	6	—N/a	—N/a	—N/a	5	1	0	0	0	5
Andrew van Wyk				21 (substituted on)	12		13		—N/a	—N/a	—N/a	3	0	0	0	0	0
Coert Cronjé						15	15	15	—N/a	—N/a	—N/a	3	0	0	0	0	0
Jacques Alberts						18 (substituted on)	18 (substituted on)		—N/a	—N/a	—N/a	2	0	0	0	0	0
Wiehan Hay								18 (substituted on)	—N/a	—N/a	—N/a	1	0	0	0	0	0
Dylan Peterson								19 (substituted on)	—N/a	—N/a	—N/a	1	0	0	0	0	0
penalty try												–	1	–	–	–	7
Total												8	39	29	6	0	273
Errol Jaggers, Thabo Mabuza and Heinrich Roelfse were named in the squad, but not included in a matchday squad.

Free State XV
Name	GRF	LEO	GRQ	SHA	GRF	LEO	GRQ	SHA	WPr	SF	F	App	Try	Con	Pen	DG	Pts
Johan Kotze	1	1	1	17 (substituted on)	1		1	1	1	—N/a	—N/a	8	0	0	0	0	0
Jacques du Toit	2	2					2			—N/a	—N/a	3	0	0	0	0	0
Stephan Kotzé	3	17 (substituted on)		3	3	17 (substituted on)		17 (substituted on)		—N/a	—N/a	6	1	0	0	0	5
Sibabalo Qoma	4	18	18 (substituted on)	4	4	18 (substituted on)	19 (substituted on)	4	4	—N/a	—N/a	8	0	0	0	0	0
Dennis Visser	5	5	5						5	—N/a	—N/a	4	0	0	0	0	0
Daniel Maartens	6	6					20 (substituted on)	6	6	—N/a	—N/a	5	0	0	0	0	0
Tienie Burger	7	7	7	7	7					—N/a	—N/a	5	1	0	0	0	5
Junior Pokomela	8	8	8			8	8	8	8	—N/a	—N/a	7	1	0	0	0	5
Ruan van Rensburg	9	9				20 (substituted on)	21 (substituted on)			—N/a	—N/a	4	1	0	0	0	5
Heinrich Bitzi	10	10				10				—N/a	—N/a	3	1	6	3	0	26
Rayno Benjamin	11	12	12	12	12					—N/a	—N/a	5	2	0	0	0	10
Ali Mgijima	12	21 (substituted on)	13	13	13	12	12	22 (substituted on)	12	—N/a	—N/a	9	2	0	0	0	10
JW Jonker	13	13	14	14	14	14	13		14	—N/a	—N/a	8	5	0	0	0	25
Luther Obi	14	14		22 (substituted on)	11	11	14		22 (substituted on)	—N/a	—N/a	7	5	0	0	0	25
Michael van der Spuy	15	15	21 (substituted on)		10			21 (substituted on)		—N/a	—N/a	5	2	0	1	0	13
Joseph Dweba	16 (substituted on)	16 (substituted on)	2	2	2	2	16 (substituted on)	2		—N/a	—N/a	8	3	0	0	0	15
Kevin Stevens	17 (substituted on)									—N/a	—N/a	1	0	0	0	0	0
Andrew Kuhn	18 (substituted on)									—N/a	—N/a	1	0	0	0	0	0
Ntokozo Vidima	19 (substituted on)	19 (substituted on)	19 (substituted on)	20	19 (substituted on)	6	6	19 (substituted on)	19 (substituted on)	—N/a	—N/a	8	2	0	0	0	10
Bertie de Bod	20 (substituted on)					19 (substituted on)				—N/a	—N/a	2	0	0	0	0	0
JP Smith	21 (substituted on)	20 (substituted on)	9	9	9	9	9		20 (substituted on)	—N/a	—N/a	8	0	0	0	0	0
Vuyani Maqina	22 (substituted on)	11	11	11	22 (substituted on)	21 (substituted on)	11	11		—N/a	—N/a	8	0	0	0	0	0
Erich de Jager		3	3	18 (substituted on)	17 (substituted on)	3	18 (substituted on)	3	3	—N/a	—N/a	8	0	0	0	0	0
Justin Basson		4	4	5		4	4	5		—N/a	—N/a	6	2	0	0	0	10
Marco Mason		22 (substituted on)	15	15	15	15	15	15	11	—N/a	—N/a	8	2	18	11	0	79
Gerhard Olivier			6	6	6	7	7	7	7	—N/a	—N/a	7	1	0	0	0	5
Ryno Eksteen			10	10			10	10	10	—N/a	—N/a	5	0	0	0	0	0
Marnus van der Merwe			16 (substituted on)	16 (substituted on)	16	16 (substituted on)		16	2	—N/a	—N/a	4	0	0	0	0	0
Boan Venter			17 (substituted on)	1		1			17 (substituted on)	—N/a	—N/a	4	0	0	0	0	0
Dian Badenhorst			20	21 (substituted on)	20 (substituted on)			20 (substituted on)		—N/a	—N/a	3	0	0	0	0	0
Lihleli Xoli			22			22 (substituted on)	22 (substituted on)	12	21 (substituted on)	—N/a	—N/a	4	0	0	0	0	0
Steven Meiring				8	8					—N/a	—N/a	2	0	0	0	0	0
Hilton Lobberts				19 (substituted on)	18 (substituted on)					—N/a	—N/a	2	0	0	0	0	0
Reniel Hugo					5	5	5			—N/a	—N/a	3	0	0	0	0	0
Stephan Janse van Rensburg					21 (substituted on)	13		13	13	—N/a	—N/a	4	1	0	0	0	5
Tom Botha							3			—N/a	—N/a	1	0	0	0	0	0
Danie Mienie							17 (substituted on)			—N/a	—N/a	1	0	0	0	0	0
Zee Mkhabela								9	9	—N/a	—N/a	2	0	0	0	0	0
Jarik van der Walt								14		—N/a	—N/a	1	0	0	0	0	0
Nicolaas Immelman								18 (substituted on)	18 (substituted on)	—N/a	—N/a	2	0	0	0	0	0
Cecil Afrika									15	—N/a	—N/a	1	0	0	0	0	0
Alex Jonker									16	—N/a	—N/a	0	0	0	0	0	0
Total												9	32	24	15	0	253
Kwenzo Blose, Warren Brits, Jurie Burger, Abri Coetzee, Aranos Coetzee, Jandré de Beer, Chris Dry, William Eybers, Rayhaan Lombaard, Phumzile Maqondwana, Sechaba Matsoele, Nakkie Naudé, Christiaan Nel, Armand Pretorius, Boom Prinsloo, Ruben Schoeman, Jean Smal, William Small-Smith, Hanno Snyman, Rosko Specman, Niell Stannard, Dimitrio Pieter Tieties and Quintin Vorster were named in the squad, but not included in a matchday squad.

Golden Lions XV
Name	PMA	WEL	GFA	BUL	PMA	WEL	GFA	BUL	PMA	GRQ	F	App	Try	Con	Pen	DG	Pts
Sti Sithole	1		1	1	1				1	1	—N/a	6	0	0	0	0	0
Pieter Jansen	2	2	2	2	16 (substituted on)	2	16 (substituted on)	16 (substituted on)	2	16 (substituted on)	—N/a	10	2	0	0	0	10
Justin Ackerman	3	1		3	3			17 (substituted on)	3	3	—N/a	7	0	0	0	0	0
Bobby de Wee	4	5	5	5	4	5	18 (substituted on)		5	4	—N/a	9	2	0	0	0	10
Marvin Orie	5		4	4	5		5	18 (substituted on)	4	5	—N/a	8	2	0	0	0	10
Victor Sekekete	6	7	7	6		19 (substituted on)					—N/a	5	1	0	0	0	5
Fabian Booysen	7		8	7	7		7	7	7	7	—N/a	8	4	0	0	0	20
Jano Venter	8			8	8	8	8	8	8	8	—N/a	8	5	0	0	0	25
Marco Jansen van Vuren	9	9	9	9	9				20 (substituted on)	20 (substituted on)	—N/a	7	0	0	0	0	0
Shaun Reynolds	10	10	21 (substituted on)	10	10		10	10	10	10	—N/a	9	4	44	10	0	138
Gerrie Labuschagné	11					11					—N/a	2	4	0	0	0	20
Gerdus van der Walt	12	12		22 (substituted on)	12	12	22 (substituted on)				—N/a	6	2	0	0	0	10
Jarryd Sage	13	13	22 (substituted on)	13	13		12	12	12	12	—N/a	9	5	0	0	0	25
Barend Smit	14										—N/a	1	0	0	0	0	0
Ashlon Davids	15	15	15	15	15				15	22 (substituted on)	—N/a	7	1	0	0	0	5
Ruan Brits	16	16 (substituted on)	16								—N/a	1	0	0	0	0	0
Pieter Scholtz	17 (substituted on)	3	3	17 (substituted on)	17 (substituted on)	3				17 (substituted on)	—N/a	7	0	0	0	0	0
JP du Preez	18 (substituted on)	4									—N/a	2	3	0	0	0	15
James Venter	19 (substituted on)	6	6			6			6	6	—N/a	6	8	0	0	0	40
Bradley Thain	20 (substituted on)	20 (substituted on)	20 (substituted on)	21 (substituted on)	20 (substituted on)	9					—N/a	6	0	0	0	0	0
Siya Masuku	21 (substituted on)	21 (substituted on)	10		21 (substituted on)	10		21 (substituted on)			—N/a	6	1	18	1	0	44
Jan-Louis la Grange	22 (substituted on)		13	14		21 (substituted on)	21 (substituted on)		13	13	—N/a	7	1	0	0	0	5
Jo-Hanko de Villiers		8									—N/a	1	0	0	0	0	0
Madosh Tambwe		11			14		11	22 (substituted on)	14	14	—N/a	6	7	0	0	0	35
Ruan Combrinck		14	14					14			—N/a	3	0	0	0	0	0
Luvuyo Pupuma		17 (substituted on)	17 (substituted on)			1			17 (substituted on)		—N/a	4	0	0	0	0	0
Rhyno Herbst		18 (substituted on)	18 (substituted on)	18 (substituted on)	18 (substituted on)	4			18 (substituted on)	18 (substituted on)	—N/a	7	0	0	0	0	0
Hacjivah Dayimani		19 (substituted on)	19	20 (substituted on)	19 (substituted on)	7	19 (substituted on)		19 (substituted on)	19 (substituted on)	—N/a	7	6	0	0	0	30
Selom Gavor		22 (substituted on)	11	11		14					—N/a	4	3	0	0	0	15
Heimar Williams			12	12							—N/a	2	0	0	0	0	0
HP van Schoor				16		16 (substituted on)					—N/a	1	0	0	0	0	0
Robert Kruger				19 (substituted on)			4	4			—N/a	3	0	0	0	0	0
Akker van der Merwe					2		2	2			—N/a	3	3	0	0	0	15
Cyle Brink					6		6	19 (substituted on)			—N/a	3	0	0	0	0	0
Aphiwe Dyantyi					11	22					—N/a	1	2	0	0	0	10
Wayne van der Bank					22 (substituted on)	13			22 (substituted on)		—N/a	3	0	0	0	0	0
Jaco van der Walt						15				15	—N/a	2	0	0	0	0	0
Bhekisa Shongwe						17 (substituted on)					—N/a	1	0	0	0	0	0
Driaan Bester						18 (substituted on)					—N/a	1	1	0	0	0	5
Morné van den Berg						20 (substituted on)					—N/a	1	1	0	0	0	5
Corné Fourie							1				—N/a	1	0	0	0	0	0
Johannes Jonker							3				—N/a	1	0	0	0	0	0
Dillon Smit							9	20 (substituted on)	9	9	—N/a	4	2	0	0	0	10
Jacques Nel							13	13			—N/a	2	1	0	0	0	5
Anthony Volmink							14	11	11	11	—N/a	4	3	0	0	0	15
Sylvian Mahuza							15	15			—N/a	2	0	0	0	0	0
Jacques van Rooyen							17 (substituted on)	1			—N/a	2	1	0	0	0	5
Faf de Klerk							20 (substituted on)	9			—N/a	2	0	0	0	0	0
Hencus van Wyk								3			—N/a	1	0	0	0	0	0
Lourens Erasmus								5			—N/a	1	1	0	0	0	5
Kwagga Smith								6			—N/a	1	1	0	0	0	5
Le Roux Baard									16 (substituted on)		—N/a	1	0	0	0	0	0
Eddie Fouché									21 (substituted on)		—N/a	1	0	0	0	0	0
Robbie Coetzee										2	—N/a	1	0	0	0	0	0
Rohan Janse van Rensburg										21 (substituted on)	—N/a	1	0	0	0	0	0
penalty try												–	1	–	–	–	7
Total												10	78	62	11	0	549
Xander Crause, Dean Gordon, Wiehan Jacobs, Morné Moos, Koos Tredoux and Jaco Willemse were named in the squad, but not included in a matchday squad.

Griffons
Name	LEO	FSt	SHA	GRQ	FSt	SHA	LEO	GRQ	QF	SF	F	App	Try	Con	Pen	DG	Pts
Barend Potgieter	1	1	1	1	1	1	1	1	—N/a	—N/a	—N/a	8	1	0	0	0	5
Khwezi Mkhafu	2	2	2	2	2	2	2	2	—N/a	—N/a	—N/a	8	1	0	0	0	5
Danie van der Merwe	3	3	3	3	3	3	3	3	—N/a	—N/a	—N/a	8	1	0	0	0	5
Gavin Annandale	4		5	4	5		18 (substituted on)	18 (substituted on)	—N/a	—N/a	—N/a	6	0	0	0	0	0
Samora Fihlani	5	4	4	19 (substituted on)	4	18 (substituted on)			—N/a	—N/a	—N/a	6	0	0	0	0	0
Thato Mavundla	6	19 (substituted on)	20 (substituted on)	20 (substituted on)	6	6	6	6	—N/a	—N/a	—N/a	8	2	0	0	0	10
Jean Pretorius	7	6	6						—N/a	—N/a	—N/a	3	0	0	0	0	0
Henco Greyling	8	8	8	6	7	7	7	7	—N/a	—N/a	—N/a	8	1	0	0	0	5
Louis Venter	9	9	9	9	9	9	9	9	—N/a	—N/a	—N/a	8	2	0	0	0	10
Jaun Kotzé	10	21 (substituted on)	22 (substituted on)	22 (substituted on)		21 (substituted on)			—N/a	—N/a	—N/a	5	0	3	0	0	6
Ezrick Alexander	11								—N/a	—N/a	—N/a	1	0	0	0	0	0
Duan Pretorius	12	10	10	10	12	10	10	10	—N/a	—N/a	—N/a	8	1	18	6	0	59
Joubert Engelbrecht	13	13	13	13	13		13	13	—N/a	—N/a	—N/a	7	3	0	0	0	15
Vuyo Mbotho	14	11	14	14	22 (substituted on)	13	21 (substituted on)	21 (substituted on)	—N/a	—N/a	—N/a	8	5	0	0	0	25
Tertius Maarman	15	15	11	11			20 (substituted on)		—N/a	—N/a	—N/a	5	1	0	0	0	5
Hennie Venter	16	16 (substituted on)	16 (substituted on)	16 (substituted on)			16 (substituted on)		—N/a	—N/a	—N/a	4	0	0	0	0	0
PW Botha	17	17 (substituted on)	17 (substituted on)	17 (substituted on)					—N/a	—N/a	—N/a	3	0	0	0	0	0
Neil Claassen	18 (substituted on)	5	7	5	19 (substituted on)	4	4	4	—N/a	—N/a	—N/a	8	2	0	0	0	10
Vincent Maruping	19 (substituted on)	7		7			19 (substituted on)	19 (substituted on)	—N/a	—N/a	—N/a	5	0	0	0	0	0
Malcolm-Kerr Till	20	20 (substituted on)	21 (substituted on)	21 (substituted on)	20 (substituted on)	20 (substituted on)		20 (substituted on)	—N/a	—N/a	—N/a	6	0	0	0	0	0
Arthur Williams	21 (substituted on)	12	12	12					—N/a	—N/a	—N/a	4	0	0	0	0	0
Sandile Kubekha	22 (substituted on)						11	11	—N/a	—N/a	—N/a	3	0	0	0	0	0
Rodney Damons		14			14	14			—N/a	—N/a	—N/a	3	1	0	0	0	5
Boela Serfontein		18 (substituted on)	18 (substituted on)		18 (substituted on)	5	5	5	—N/a	—N/a	—N/a	6	0	0	0	0	0
Alrin Eksteen		22 (substituted on)	15	15	15	15	15	15	—N/a	—N/a	—N/a	7	3	0	0	0	15
Jasper Wiese			19 (substituted on)	8	8	8	8	8	—N/a	—N/a	—N/a	6	3	0	0	0	15
Rudi Britz				18 (substituted on)	17 (substituted on)	17 (substituted on)			—N/a	—N/a	—N/a	3	0	0	0	0	0
Robbie Petzer					10				—N/a	—N/a	—N/a	1	0	0	1	0	3
Warren Williams					11	11	14		—N/a	—N/a	—N/a	3	3	0	0	0	15
Reinach Venter					16 (substituted on)	16 (substituted on)		16 (substituted on)	—N/a	—N/a	—N/a	3	0	0	0	0	0
Carel-Jan Coetzee					21 (substituted on)	12	12	12	—N/a	—N/a	—N/a	4	2	0	0	0	10
Cornel Jacobs						19 (substituted on)			—N/a	—N/a	—N/a	1	0	0	0	0	0
Wynand Pienaar						22 (substituted on)	22 (substituted on)	22 (substituted on)	—N/a	—N/a	—N/a	3	0	2	0	0	4
Ruan Kramer							17 (substituted on)	17 (substituted on)	—N/a	—N/a	—N/a	2	0	0	0	0	0
Total												8	32	23	7	0	227
JP Alberts, Hein Bezuidenhoudt, Shirwin Cupido, Selvyn Davids, Andrew du Plessis, Ruben Fourie, Werner Kotze, JP Mans, George Marich, Japie Nel, Nazo Nkala, Martin Sithole, Sherwin Slater, Joe van der Hoogt and Leighton van Wyk were named in the squad, but not included in a matchday squad.

Griquas
Name	SHA	LEO	FSt	GRF	LEO	FSt	SHA	GRF	EPK	LIO	WPr	App	Try	Con	Pen	DG	Pts
Liam Hendricks	1	1	1		1			1	1	1	1	8	0	0	0	0	0
AJ le Roux	2		2	2	2	2	2	17	2	2	2	9	3	0	0	0	15
Ewald van der Westhuizen	3	3	3	3		3	3		17 (substituted on)	3	3	9	1	0	0	0	5
FP Pelser	4	5	4		4				18 (substituted on)	4	4	7	0	0	0	0	0
Pieter Jansen van Vuren	5	18 (substituted on)	5	5	5	5	5	5	5	5	5	11	0	0	0	0	0
Wendal Wehr	6	6	6		6	6	6		6	6	6	9	3	0	0	0	15
Sias Koen	7	7	19 (substituted on)	7	7	7	7		7	7	7	10	2	0	0	0	10
Jason Fraser	8	8	8	8	8	8	8			8	8	9	4	0	0	0	20
Christiaan Meyer	9	9		9		20 (substituted on)	20 (substituted on)	9	20 (substituted on)	9	9	9	4	0	0	0	20
George Whitehead	10	10	10	10	21	21 (substituted on)	10	10	10	10	10	10	1	35	4	0	87
Ederies Arendse	11	11	14		14	14	14		14	14	14	9	6	0	0	0	30
Johnathan Francke	12	12										2	0	0	0	0	0
Tertius Kruger	13	13	12	12	12	12		12	12	12	12	10	7	0	0	0	35
Koch Marx	14	14	13	14			11	13	13		13	8	4	0	0	0	20
AJ Coertzen	15	15	15	22 (substituted on)	11	11	15	21 (substituted on)		11	11	10	2	0	0	0	10
Marius Fourie	16 (substituted on)			16 (substituted on)	17	16 (substituted on)	1	2	16 (substituted on)	16 (substituted on)	16 (substituted on)	8	1	0	0	0	5
NJ Oosthuizen	17 (substituted on)	17 (substituted on)	17 (substituted on)		3	1		3	3	17 (substituted on)	17 (substituted on)	9	1	0	0	0	5
Jonathan Adendorf	18 (substituted on)	4		18 (substituted on)	18	18 (substituted on)		4	4	18 (substituted on)	18 (substituted on)	8	0	0	0	0	0
De Wet Kruger	19 (substituted on)	19 (substituted on)		19 (substituted on)	20			19 (substituted on)				4	0	0	0	0	0
Renier Botha	20 (substituted on)	20 (substituted on)	9	20 (substituted on)	9	9	9		9	20 (substituted on)	20 (substituted on)	10	5	0	0	0	25
André Swarts	21 (substituted on)		21 (substituted on)	21 (substituted on)	10	10	12		21 (substituted on)	21 (substituted on)	21 (substituted on)	9	3	16	6	0	65
Enver Brandt	22 (substituted on)	22 (substituted on)	11	11		22 (substituted on)	21 (substituted on)	11	11	22 (substituted on)	22 (substituted on)	10	9	0	0	0	45
Wilmar Arnoldi		2	16 (substituted on)		16		16 (substituted on)	16 (substituted on)				4	1	0	0	0	5
Brandon Haas		16 (substituted on)										1	0	0	0	0	0
Eric Zana		21 (substituted on)	22 (substituted on)	15	15	15	22 (substituted on)	15	15	15	15	10	3	3	0	0	21
RJ Liebenberg			7	6		19 (substituted on)	19 (substituted on)	6	8			6	0	0	0	0	0
Shaun McDonald			18 (substituted on)	4	19	4	4	7				5	1	0	0	0	5
Devon Nash			20 (substituted on)									1	0	0	0	0	0
Devon Martinus				1								1	0	0	0	0	0
Kyle Steyn				13	13	13	13	22 (substituted on)	22 (substituted on)	13		7	1	0	0	0	5
Mthunzi Moloi				17 (substituted on)		17 (substituted on)	17 (substituted on)					3	0	0	0	0	0
Alvin Brandt					22 (substituted on)			14				2	1	0	0	0	5
Jono Janse van Rensburg							18 (substituted on)	8	19 (substituted on)	19 (substituted on)	19 (substituted on)	5	0	0	0	0	0
Steph Vermeulen								18 (substituted on)				1	0	0	0	0	0
Tiaan Dorfling								20 (substituted on)				1	0	0	0	0	0
penalty try												–	1	–	–	–	7
Total												11	64	54	10	0	460

Leopards
Name	GRF	GRQ	FSt	SHA	GRQ	FSt	SHA	GRF	QF	SF	F	App	Try	Con	Pen	DG	Pts
Joe Smith	1	1	1	1	1		1	1	—N/a	—N/a	—N/a	7	1	0	0	0	5
Dane van der Westhuyzen	2	2	2	2	2	2	2	2	—N/a	—N/a	—N/a	8	0	0	0	0	0
Morné Strydom	3	3	3	17 (substituted on)	18	1	17	18 (substituted on)	—N/a	—N/a	—N/a	6	0	0	0	0	0
Loftus Morrison	4	18 (substituted on)					18	5	—N/a	—N/a	—N/a	3	1	0	0	0	5
Willem Steenkamp	5	5							—N/a	—N/a	—N/a	2	0	0	0	0	0
Gideon van der Merwe	6	6	6	6	6	6	6	6	—N/a	—N/a	—N/a	8	4	0	0	0	20
Boela Venter	7	4			17	17 (substituted on)		17 (substituted on)	—N/a	—N/a	—N/a	4	1	0	0	0	5
Juan Language	8	8	8	8	8	19 (substituted on)	19	8	—N/a	—N/a	—N/a	7	1	0	0	0	5
Chriswill September	9	9	9	9	9	9			—N/a	—N/a	—N/a	6	0	0	0	0	0
Schalk Hugo	10	10	10	10	10	21 (substituted on)	20 (substituted on)	20 (substituted on)	—N/a	—N/a	—N/a	8	2	15	5	0	55
Gene Willemse	11	11	11	11	11	11	22	11	—N/a	—N/a	—N/a	7	4	0	0	0	20
Henko Marais	12	12		12	12	12	12	12	—N/a	—N/a	—N/a	7	3	0	0	0	15
Bradley Moolman	13		21 (substituted on)	13	13		11	13	—N/a	—N/a	—N/a	6	0	0	0	0	0
Rowayne Beukman	14	14	14	14	14	14			—N/a	—N/a	—N/a	6	1	0	0	0	5
Tapiwa Mafura	15	15	15	15	15	15	15	15	—N/a	—N/a	—N/a	8	3	0	0	0	15
Louis van der Westhuizen	16 (substituted on)	16 (substituted on)	16 (substituted on)	16 (substituted on)	16				—N/a	—N/a	—N/a	4	0	0	0	0	0
Matimu Manganyi	17 (substituted on)	17 (substituted on)							—N/a	—N/a	—N/a	2	0	0	0	0	0
Marno Redelinghuys	18 (substituted on)	7	7		7	7			—N/a	—N/a	—N/a	5	2	0	0	0	10
Gopolang Molefe	19								—N/a	—N/a	—N/a	0	0	0	0	0	0
Wessel Kuhn	20	20 (substituted on)	20 (substituted on)	20 (substituted on)		20 (substituted on)	9	9	—N/a	—N/a	—N/a	6	0	0	0	0	0
Gerhard Nortier	21 (substituted on)	21 (substituted on)	12	21 (substituted on)	20	10	10	10	—N/a	—N/a	—N/a	7	0	5	3	0	19
Lungelo Gosa	22 (substituted on)	22 (substituted on)	22 (substituted on)	22 (substituted on)					—N/a	—N/a	—N/a	4	0	0	0	0	0
Elden Schoeman		13	13		21 (substituted on)	13	13	22 (substituted on)	—N/a	—N/a	—N/a	6	1	0	0	0	5
Jeandré Rudolph		19 (substituted on)	19 (substituted on)	7	19 (substituted on)	8	8	19 (substituted on)	—N/a	—N/a	—N/a	7	1	0	0	0	5
Stairs Mhlongo			4				4	4	—N/a	—N/a	—N/a	3	0	0	0	0	0
Walt Steenkamp			5	5	5	5	5		—N/a	—N/a	—N/a	5	0	0	0	0	0
Ruan Venter			17 (substituted on)	4					—N/a	—N/a	—N/a	2	0	0	0	0	0
Schalk Jooste			18 (substituted on)	3	3	3			—N/a	—N/a	—N/a	4	0	0	0	0	0
Dewald Dekker				18 (substituted on)		18 (substituted on)	3	3	—N/a	—N/a	—N/a	4	0	0	0	0	0
Jaco Swanepoel				19 (substituted on)					—N/a	—N/a	—N/a	1	0	0	0	0	0
HP Swart					4	4	7	7	—N/a	—N/a	—N/a	4	1	0	0	0	5
Jimmy Mpailane					22	22 (substituted on)	14	14	—N/a	—N/a	—N/a	3	1	0	0	0	5
Cameron van Heerden						16	16	16 (substituted on)	—N/a	—N/a	—N/a	1	0	0	0	0	0
Akhona Nela							21	21 (substituted on)	—N/a	—N/a	—N/a	1	0	0	0	0	0
Total												8	27	20	8	0	199
Duhann Gunter, Eugene Hare, Jaco Hayward, Robert Hunt, Mogau Mabokela, Muziwandile Mazibuko, Hendrik Mulder, Justin Newman, Dylan Schoeman and Nico van Tonder were named in the squad, but not included in a matchday squad.

Pumas
Name	BUL	LIO	WEL	GFA	BUL	LIO	WEL	GFA	QF	SF	F	App	Try	Con	Pen	DG	Pts
Jacques Kotzé	1	1			17 (substituted on)		17 (substituted on)	17 (substituted on)	17 (substituted on)	—N/a	—N/a	6	0	0	0	0	0
Marko Janse van Rensburg	2	2	16 (substituted on)	16 (substituted on)	2	2			2	—N/a	—N/a	7	3	0	0	0	15
Marné Coetzee	3	3	3	3	3	3	3	3	3	—N/a	—N/a	9	0	0	0	0	0
Tazz Fuzani	4	4			4		4	4	4	—N/a	—N/a	6	0	0	0	0	0
Hugo Kloppers	5	5	5	5	5	5	5		5	—N/a	—N/a	8	0	0	0	0	0
Reuben Johannes	6	6								—N/a	—N/a	2	0	0	0	0	0
Willie Engelbrecht	7	7	7	7	7	19 (substituted on)	19 (substituted on)			—N/a	—N/a	7	0	0	0	0	0
Carel Greeff	8	8	8	8	8	8	8	8	8	—N/a	—N/a	9	5	0	0	0	25
Reynier van Rooyen	9	9	9	9	9	9	20 (substituted on)	20 (substituted on)	20 (substituted on)	—N/a	—N/a	9	3	0	0	0	15
Kobus Marais	10	10	10	10	10	21 (substituted on)	10		10	—N/a	—N/a	8	1	14	12	0	69
JP Lewis	11	11	11	11	11	11	11			—N/a	—N/a	7	3	0	0	0	15
Leighton van Wyk	12	12								—N/a	—N/a	2	0	0	0	0	0
Hennie Skorbinski	13	13			13	13	13	13	13	—N/a	—N/a	7	2	0	0	0	10
Ruwellyn Isbell	14	14	14	14	14	14		11	11	—N/a	—N/a	8	4	0	0	0	20
Sias Ebersohn	15	15	21 (substituted on)	21 (substituted on)	21 (substituted on)	10	21 (substituted on)	10		—N/a	—N/a	8	1	14	1	0	36
Frank Herne	16 (substituted on)	16 (substituted on)	2	2	16 (substituted on)	16 (substituted on)	2	2	16 (substituted on)	—N/a	—N/a	9	9	0	0	0	45
De-Jay Terblanche	17 (substituted on)	17 (substituted on)	1	1		17 (substituted on)				—N/a	—N/a	5	1	0	0	0	5
Stephan Greeff	18 (substituted on)	18 (substituted on)	4	4		18 (substituted on)		18 (substituted on)		—N/a	—N/a	6	0	0	0	0	0
Brian Shabangu	19 (substituted on)	19 (substituted on)	6	6	6	6				—N/a	—N/a	6	1	0	0	0	5
Emile Temperman	20 (substituted on)	20 (substituted on)	20 (substituted on)	20 (substituted on)	20 (substituted on)	20 (substituted on)	9	9	9	—N/a	—N/a	9	3	0	0	0	15
Deon Helberg	21 (substituted on)		13	13						—N/a	—N/a	3	0	0	0	0	0
Devon Williams	22 (substituted on)	22 (substituted on)	15	15	15	15	15	22 (substituted on)	22 (substituted on)	—N/a	—N/a	9	4	0	0	0	20
Ryan Nell		21 (substituted on)	12	12	12	12	12	12	12	—N/a	—N/a	8	3	0	0	0	15
Khwezi Mona			17 (substituted on)	17 (substituted on)	1	1	1	1	1	—N/a	—N/a	7	0	0	0	0	0
Jannie Stander			18 (substituted on)	18 (substituted on)	18 (substituted on)	4	18 (substituted on)	5	18 (substituted on)	—N/a	—N/a	7	1	0	0	0	5
Johann Grundlingh			19 (substituted on)							—N/a	—N/a	1	0	0	0	0	0
Tyler Fisher			22 (substituted on)							—N/a	—N/a	1	0	0	0	0	0
Nardus van der Walt				19 (substituted on)	19 (substituted on)	7	7	7	7	—N/a	—N/a	6	1	0	0	0	5
Trompie Pretorius				22 (substituted on)	22 (substituted on)	22 (substituted on)	14	14	14	—N/a	—N/a	6	0	0	0	0	0
Francois Kleinhans							6	6	6	—N/a	—N/a	3	2	0	0	0	10
Mark Pretorius							16 (substituted on)	16 (substituted on)		—N/a	—N/a	2	0	0	0	0	0
Gerrit Smith							22 (substituted on)	15	15	—N/a	—N/a	3	0	0	0	0	0
Lambert Groenewald								19 (substituted on)	19 (substituted on)	—N/a	—N/a	2	0	0	0	0	0
Justin van Staden								21 (substituted on)	21 (substituted on)	—N/a	—N/a	2	0	3	1	0	9
penalty try												–	1	–	–	–	7
Total												9	48	31	14	0	346
Louis Albertse, Bernado Botha, Wiehan Hay, Jeremy Jordaan, Luxolo Koza, Hoffmann Maritz, Morgan Naudé, Dylan Peterson, Marnus Schoeman, Marlou van Niekerk and Simon Westraadt were named in the squad, but not included in a matchday squad.

Sharks XV
Name	QF	SF	F	App	Try	Con	Pen	DG	Pts
Lourens Adriaanse				0	0	0	0	0	0
Hyron Andrews				0	0	0	0	0	0
Ngoni Chidoma				0	0	0	0	0	0
Stephan Coetzee				0	0	0	0	0	0
Keegan Daniel				0	0	0	0	0	0
Jean Droste				0	0	0	0	0	0
Andrew du Plessis				0	0	0	0	0	0
Dan du Preez				0	0	0	0	0	0
Gerhard Engelbrecht				0	0	0	0	0	0
Graham Geldenhuys				0	0	0	0	0	0
Thierry Kounga Kuaté				0	0	0	0	0	0
Ruan Kramer				0	0	0	0	0	0
Stephan Lewies				0	0	0	0	0	0
Khaya Majola				0	0	0	0	0	0
Mzamo Majola				0	0	0	0	0	0
John-Hubert Meyer				0	0	0	0	0	0
Tera Mtembu				0	0	0	0	0	0
Bandisa Ndlovu				0	0	0	0	0	0
Etienne Oosthuizen				0	0	0	0	0	0
Juan Schoeman				0	0	0	0	0	0
Philip van der Walt				0	0	0	0	0	0
Kerron van Vuuren				0	0	0	0	0	0
Jacques Vermeulen				0	0	0	0	0	0
Wian Vosloo				0	0	0	0	0	0
Rikus Zwart				0	0	0	0	0	0
Garth April				0	0	0	0	0	0
Brandon Bailing				0	0	0	0	0	0
Tristan Blewett				0	0	0	0	0	0
Michael Claassens				0	0	0	0	0	0
Johan Deysel				0	0	0	0	0	0
André Esterhuizen				0	0	0	0	0	0
Rowan Gouws				0	0	0	0	0	0
Benhard Janse van Rensburg				0	0	0	0	0	0
Morné Joubert				0	0	0	0	0	0
Marius Louw				0	0	0	0	0	0
Ilunga Mukendi				0	0	0	0	0	0
Odwa Ndungane				0	0	0	0	0	0
S'busiso Nkosi				0	0	0	0	0	0
Cobus Reinach				0	0	0	0	0	0
S'bura Sithole				0	0	0	0	0	0
Damian Stevens				0	0	0	0	0	0
Kobus van Wyk				0	0	0	0	0	0
Hanco Venter				0	0	0	0	0	0
Danrich Visagie				0	0	0	0	0	0
Courtney Winnaar				0	0	0	0	0	0
Total				0	0	0	0	0	0
Ryan Carlson, Francois de Villiers, Andrew Evans, Clifferd Jacobs, Francois Kleinhans, Khulu Marwana, Michael Meyer, Enoch Mnyaka, Clément Poitrenaud, Inny Radebe, Rhyno Smith, Samuel Swanepoel and James Tedder were named in the squad, but not included in a matchday squad.

SWD Eagles
Name									QF	SF	F	App	Try	Con	Pen	DG	Pts
Juandré Digue	1	1	17 (substituted on)	16 (substituted on)	1	1			—N/a	—N/a	—N/a	6	0	0	0	0	0
Jacques Vermaak	2	2							—N/a	—N/a	—N/a	2	0	0	0	0	0
Basil Short	3	3	3	3	3	17 (substituted on)			—N/a	—N/a	—N/a	6	0	0	0	0	0
Anton Smit	4								—N/a	—N/a	—N/a	1	0	0	0	0	0
Cornell Hess	5	5	5	5					—N/a	—N/a	—N/a	4	0	0	0	0	0
Janneman Stander	6	6	6	6	6	7	6	7	—N/a	—N/a	—N/a	8	0	0	0	0	0
Lodewyk Uys	7	7	7	7		19 (substituted on)	5	18 (substituted on)	—N/a	—N/a	—N/a	7	2	0	0	0	10
Christo du Plessis	8	8		19 (substituted on)					—N/a	—N/a	—N/a	3	1	0	0	0	5
Boela Abrahams	9	9	20 (substituted on)						—N/a	—N/a	—N/a	3	0	0	0	0	0
Martin du Toit	10								—N/a	—N/a	—N/a	1	0	0	0	0	0
Adri Jacobs	11	11		11	11	13	13	11	—N/a	—N/a	—N/a	7	4	0	0	0	20
Wilneth Engelbrecht	12	13	21 (substituted on)	21 (substituted on)			21 (substituted on)	21 (substituted on)	—N/a	—N/a	—N/a	6	0	0	0	0	0
Kirsten Heyns	13		13	13	13			14	—N/a	—N/a	—N/a	5	1	0	0	0	5
Shadward Fillies	14	14	22	20 (substituted on)					—N/a	—N/a	—N/a	3	0	0	0	0	0
Leighton Eksteen	15	15	15	15	15	10	10	10	—N/a	—N/a	—N/a	8	1	16	6	0	55
Kurt Haupt	16 (substituted on)					2	16 (substituted on)	2	—N/a	—N/a	—N/a	4	0	0	0	0	0
Teunis Nieuwoudt	17 (substituted on)	17 (substituted on)	1	1	17 (substituted on)	3	1	3	—N/a	—N/a	—N/a	8	1	0	0	0	5
Freginald Africa	18 (substituted on)	18 (substituted on)	18 (substituted on)	18 (substituted on)	19 (substituted on)	6		6	—N/a	—N/a	—N/a	7	1	0	0	0	5
Daniël Maree	19 (substituted on)	19 (substituted on)	8			20 (substituted on)	8	19 (substituted on)	—N/a	—N/a	—N/a	6	1	0	0	0	5
Dillin Snel	20 (substituted on)	20 (substituted on)	9	9	20 (substituted on)	21 (substituted on)	9	20 (substituted on)	—N/a	—N/a	—N/a	8	2	0	0	0	10
Johnny Welthagen	21 (substituted on)	12	12	12	10	22 (substituted on)	12		—N/a	—N/a	—N/a	7	3	0	0	0	15
Quaid Langeveldt	22 (substituted on)	10	10	10			22 (substituted on)	22 (substituted on)	—N/a	—N/a	—N/a	6	2	0	0	0	10
Brendon Snyman		4	4	4	5	5		5	—N/a	—N/a	—N/a	6	0	0	0	0	0
Jan van der Merwe		16 (substituted on)	2	2	2	16 (substituted on)	2	16 (substituted on)	—N/a	—N/a	—N/a	7	1	0	0	0	5
Rhupino Plaatjies		21 (substituted on)							—N/a	—N/a	—N/a	1	0	0	0	0	0
Justin Bhana		22	11						—N/a	—N/a	—N/a	1	0	0	0	0	0
Charles Radebe			14	14	14	14	14		—N/a	—N/a	—N/a	5	0	0	0	0	0
Brianton Booysen			16						—N/a	—N/a	—N/a	0	0	0	0	0	0
Thor Halvorsen			19 (substituted on)	8	8		19 (substituted on)		—N/a	—N/a	—N/a	4	1	0	0	0	5
Ayyoob Moerat				17 (substituted on)	16		3	17 (substituted on)	—N/a	—N/a	—N/a	3	0	0	0	0	0
Marlo Weich				22 (substituted on)	21 (substituted on)	15	15	15	—N/a	—N/a	—N/a	5	1	0	0	0	5
Peet van der Walt					4	4	18 (substituted on)		—N/a	—N/a	—N/a	3	0	0	0	0	0
Davon Raubenheimer					7	8	7	8	—N/a	—N/a	—N/a	4	0	0	0	0	0
Johan Steyn					9	9	20 (substituted on)	9	—N/a	—N/a	—N/a	4	0	0	0	0	0
Marlou van Niekerk					12	12		12	—N/a	—N/a	—N/a	3	1	0	0	0	5
Jeremy Jordaan					18 (substituted on)	18 (substituted on)	4	4	—N/a	—N/a	—N/a	4	0	0	0	0	0
Tyler Fisher					22 (substituted on)	11	11	13	—N/a	—N/a	—N/a	4	0	0	0	0	0
Layle Delo							17 (substituted on)	1	—N/a	—N/a	—N/a	2	1	0	0	0	5
penalty try												–	1	–	–	–	7
Total												8	25	16	6	0	179
Leegan Moos, Andisa Ntsila, Luzuko Vulindlu and Matt Wiseman were named in the squad, but not included in a matchday squad.

Welwitschias
Name	GFA	BUL	LIO	PMA	GFA	BUL	LIO	PMA	QF	SF	F	App	Try	Con	Pen	DG	Pts
Christo McNish	1	1	17 (substituted on)	17 (substituted on)		1	1	17 (substituted on)	—N/a	—N/a	—N/a	7	0	0	0	0	0
Shaun du Preez	2	2		2	2				—N/a	—N/a	—N/a	4	0	0	0	0	0
AJ de Klerk	3	3	18 (substituted on)	18 (substituted on)	18 (substituted on)				—N/a	—N/a	—N/a	5	0	0	0	0	0
Munio Kasiringua	4	4	4			4		19 (substituted on)	—N/a	—N/a	—N/a	5	0	0	0	0	0
Max Katjijeko	5		5	5	5	5	5	5	—N/a	—N/a	—N/a	7	1	0	0	0	5
Rohan Kitshoff	6	6		6	6	6			—N/a	—N/a	—N/a	5	0	0	0	0	0
Thomasau Forbes	7	7	6		7	7	6	7	—N/a	—N/a	—N/a	7	0	0	0	0	0
Leneve Damens	8	8	7	7					—N/a	—N/a	—N/a	4	1	0	0	0	5
Eugene Jantjies	9	9	9	9	9				—N/a	—N/a	—N/a	5	1	0	0	0	5
Theuns Kotzé	10	10	10	10	10				—N/a	—N/a	—N/a	5	0	11	6	0	40
Gino Wilson	11	11		11	11				—N/a	—N/a	—N/a	4	3	0	0	0	15
Darryl de la Harpe	12	12		12	12				—N/a	—N/a	—N/a	4	0	0	0	0	0
JC Greyling	13	13	13	13	13				—N/a	—N/a	—N/a	5	2	0	0	0	10
Lesley Klim	14	14	14	14	14				—N/a	—N/a	—N/a	5	5	0	0	0	25
David Philander	15	15	11	15	15	14	15	15	—N/a	—N/a	—N/a	8	2	0	0	0	10
Andries Rousseau	16 (substituted on)	18 (substituted on)	3	3	3	3	3	3	—N/a	—N/a	—N/a	8	1	0	0	0	5
Collen Smith	17 (substituted on)	17 (substituted on)	1	1	1				—N/a	—N/a	—N/a	5	0	0	0	0	0
Mahepisa Tjeriko	18 (substituted on)	19 (substituted on)	19 (substituted on)		19 (substituted on)				—N/a	—N/a	—N/a	4	0	0	0	0	0
Roderique Victor	19 (substituted on)		8	8	8	8	8	20 (substituted on)	—N/a	—N/a	—N/a	7	1	0	0	0	5
Francois Wiese	20 (substituted on)		12		22 (substituted on)	12		12	—N/a	—N/a	—N/a	5	0	0	0	0	0
Cameron Klassen	21 (substituted on)	21 (substituted on)	21 (substituted on)	21 (substituted on)		9			—N/a	—N/a	—N/a	5	0	0	0	0	0
Aurelio Plato	22 (substituted on)		15			22 (substituted on)	22 (substituted on)		—N/a	—N/a	—N/a	4	0	0	0	0	0
Ruan Ludick		5		19 (substituted on)	4				—N/a	—N/a	—N/a	3	0	0	0	0	0
Gert Lotter		16 (substituted on)	2						—N/a	—N/a	—N/a	2	0	0	0	0	0
Thomas Kali		20 (substituted on)	20 (substituted on)	4		20 (substituted on)	20 (substituted on)		—N/a	—N/a	—N/a	5	0	0	0	0	0
Heinrich Smit		22 (substituted on)	22 (substituted on)	22 (substituted on)					—N/a	—N/a	—N/a	3	0	0	0	0	0
Obert Nortjé			16 (substituted on)	16 (substituted on)	16 (substituted on)	16 (substituted on)	2	2	—N/a	—N/a	—N/a	6	0	0	0	0	0
Adriaan Booysen				20 (substituted on)	20 (substituted on)		7	8	—N/a	—N/a	—N/a	4	0	0	0	0	0
Des Sethie					17 (substituted on)	17 (substituted on)	17 (substituted on)	1	—N/a	—N/a	—N/a	4	0	0	0	0	0
Dirk von Weidts					21	10	10	10	—N/a	—N/a	—N/a	3	1	1	0	0	7
Niël van Vuuren						2	16 (substituted on)	16 (substituted on)	—N/a	—N/a	—N/a	3	0	0	0	0	0
Nikin Cloete						11			—N/a	—N/a	—N/a	1	1	0	0	0	5
Ethan Beukes						13	12	13	—N/a	—N/a	—N/a	3	0	0	0	0	0
Justin Nel						15			—N/a	—N/a	—N/a	1	0	0	0	0	0
Denzil van Wyk						19 (substituted on)	19 (substituted on)	4	—N/a	—N/a	—N/a	3	0	0	0	0	0
Russell van Wyk						21 (substituted on)	11	14	—N/a	—N/a	—N/a	3	0	0	0	0	0
Winmar Rust							4	6	—N/a	—N/a	—N/a	2	0	0	1	0	3
JC Winckler							9	9	—N/a	—N/a	—N/a	2	0	0	0	0	0
Janré du Toit							13	11	—N/a	—N/a	—N/a	2	0	0	0	0	0
Collins Omalu							14		—N/a	—N/a	—N/a	1	0	0	0	0	0
Herman Grobler							18 (substituted on)	18 (substituted on)	—N/a	—N/a	—N/a	2	0	0	0	0	0
TC Kisting							21	21 (substituted on)	—N/a	—N/a	—N/a	1	0	0	0	0	0
Mahco Prinsloo								22 (substituted on)	—N/a	—N/a	—N/a	1	0	0	0	0	0
Nelius Theron									—N/a	—N/a	—N/a	0	0	0	0	0	0
Total												8	19	12	7	0	140
Nian Berg, Enem Kritzinger, James Marx, Malcolm Moore, Philip Nashikaku, MP Pretorius and Heico Prinsloo were named in the squad, but not included in a matchday squad.

Western Province
Name	QF	SF	F	App	Try	Con	Pen	DG	Pts
Wesley Adonis				0	0	0	0	0	0
Juarno Augustus				0	0	0	0	0	0
Eital Bredenkamp				0	0	0	0	0	0
Jaco Coetzee				0	0	0	0	0	0
Ruben de Villiers				0	0	0	0	0	0
Johan du Toit				0	0	0	0	0	0
Rynhardt Elstadt				0	0	0	0	0	0
Brenden Esterhuizen				0	0	0	0	0	0
Oli Kebble				0	0	0	0	0	0
Michael Kumbirai				0	0	0	0	0	0
Percy Mngadi				0	0	0	0	0	0
Dean Muir				0	0	0	0	0	0
Niel Oelofse				0	0	0	0	0	0
Caylib Oosthuizen				0	0	0	0	0	0
Conway Pretorius				0	0	0	0	0	0
JD Schickerling				0	0	0	0	0	0
Chad Solomon				0	0	0	0	0	0
Piet-Louw Strauss				0	0	0	0	0	0
Luke Stringer				0	0	0	0	0	0
Nyasha Tarusenga				0	0	0	0	0	0
Jurie van Vuuren				0	0	0	0	0	0
Frans van Wyk				0	0	0	0	0	0
Ashley Wells				0	0	0	0	0	0
Eduard Zandberg				0	0	0	0	0	0
Craig Barry				0	0	0	0	0	0
Bjorn Basson				0	0	0	0	0	0
Kurt Coleman				0	0	0	0	0	0
Juan de Jongh				0	0	0	0	0	0
Daniël du Plessis				0	0	0	0	0	0
Michal Haznar				0	0	0	0	0	0
Grant Hermanus				0	0	0	0	0	0
Errol Jaggers				0	0	0	0	0	0
Herschel Jantjies				0	0	0	0	0	0
Harlon Klaasen				0	0	0	0	0	0
Dan Kriel				0	0	0	0	0	0
Godlen Masimla				0	0	0	0	0	0
Ruhan Nel				0	0	0	0	0	0
Khanyo Ngcukana				0	0	0	0	0	0
Ryan Oosthuizen				0	0	0	0	0	0
Justin Phillips				0	0	0	0	0	0
Marcello Sampson				0	0	0	0	0	0
Ernst Stapelberg				0	0	0	0	0	0
Brandon Thomson				0	0	0	0	0	0
Scott van Breda				0	0	0	0	0	0
Valentino Wellman				0	0	0	0	0	0
Total				0	0	0	0	0	0
Saud Abrahams, Siphamandla Dama, Paul de Wet, Nico Leonard, Tristan Leyds, Daniël Maree, Ayyoob Moerat, Carlü Sadie, Cornel Smit, Ruben Terblanche, Mujaahid van der Hoven, Kobus van Dyk, Chevandré van Schoor, Alistair Vermaak, Jondré Williams and Leolin Zas were named in the squad, but not included in a matchday squad.

=== Top scorers ===
The top ten try and point scorers during the 2017 Rugby Challenge were:

Top ten try scorers
No	Player	Team	Tries
1	Enver Brandt	Griquas	9
1	Frank Herne	Pumas	9
3	Craig Barry	Western Province	8
3	James Venter	Golden Lions XV	8
5	Tertius Kruger	Griquas	7
5	Madosh Tambwe	Golden Lions XV	7
5	Oliver Zono	Border Bulldogs	7
8	Ederies Arendse	Griquas	6
8	Hacjivah Dayimani	Golden Lions XV	6
8	Franco Naudé	Blue Bulls XV	6
8	Boom Prinsloo	Blue Bulls XV	6
8	Etienne Taljaard	Falcons	6
8	Keanu Vers	Eastern Province Kings	6

Top ten points scorers
No	Player	Team	Points
1	Shaun Reynolds	Golden Lions XV	138
2	Oliver Zono	Border Bulldogs	101
3	George Whitehead	Griquas	87
4	Marco Mason	Free State XV	79
5	Divan Nel	Boland Cavaliers	71
6	Brandon Thomson	Western Province	70
7	Kobus Marais	Pumas	69
8	André Swarts	Griquas	62
9	Leighton Eksteen	SWD Eagles	61
10	Duan Pretorius	Griffons	59

== Referees ==
The following referees officiated matches in the 2017 Rugby Challenge:

2018 Rugby Challenge referees
Stuart Berry • Rodney Boneparte • Ben Crouse • Stephan Geldenhuys • Quinton Immelman • AJ Jacobs • Cwengile Jadezweni • Pro Legoete • Vusi Msibi • Jaco Pretorius • Rasta Rasivhenge • Egon Seconds • Lourens van der Merwe • Marius van der Westhuizen • Jaco van Heerden

== See also ==
- 2017 Currie Cup Premier Division
- 2017 Currie Cup First Division
