= Eta College =

Trans-national, sports science, educational institution

eta College
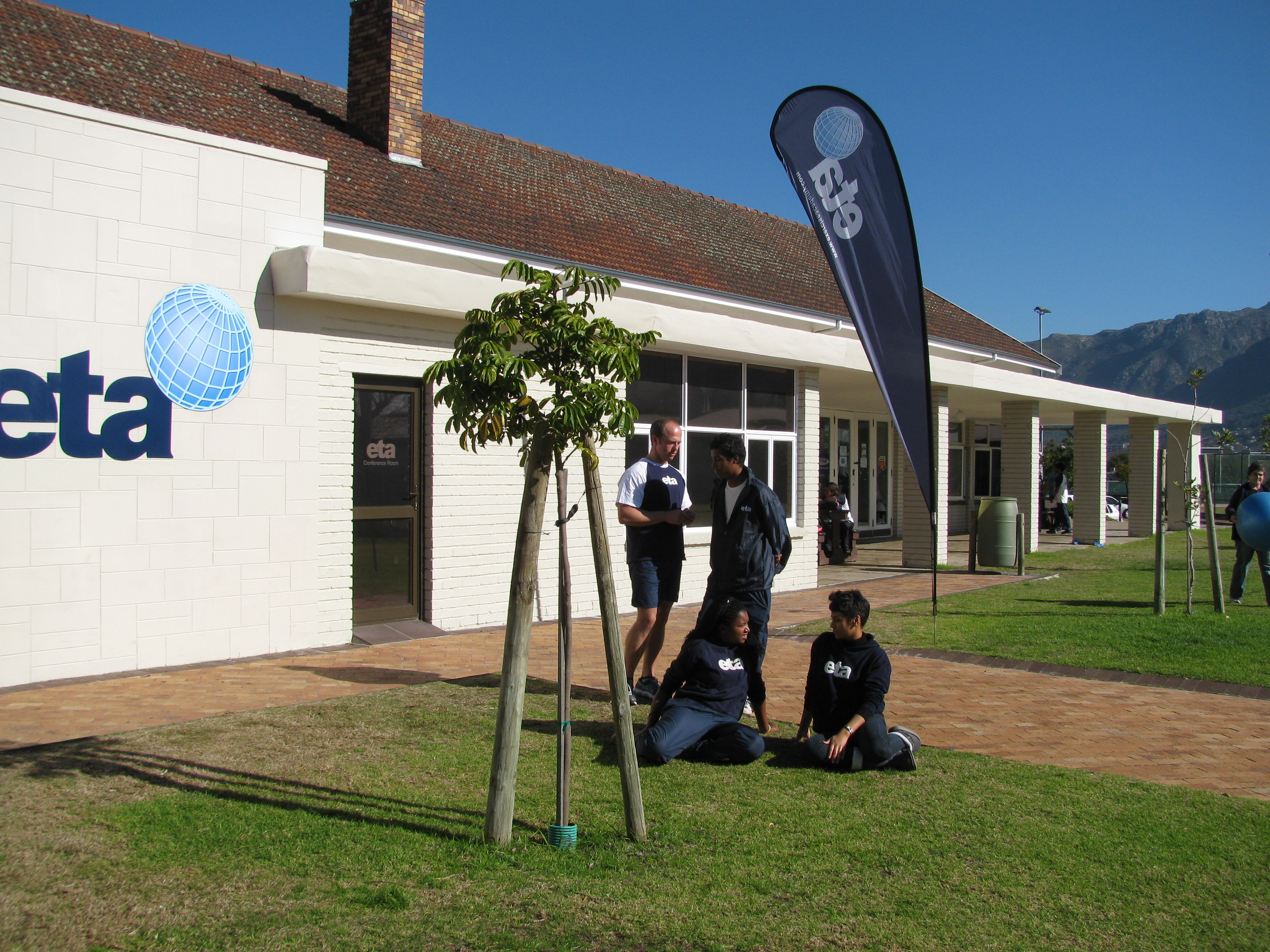
- Cape Town eta College Campus
- Former names: Exercise Teachers Academy
- Type: Private College
- Established: 1 January 1983; 43 years ago
- Affiliations: DHET, CHEC, REPPSA, SSISA, APPETD, CATHSSETA, ETDPSETA, College SA, Sharks, Blue Bulls Rugby Union, Stellenbosch Rugby Academy, WPCC, JR School Mauritius, Core Direction Dubai, Virgin Active.
- Officer in charge: Linda Halliday
- Director: Dr Steve Harris
- Academic staff: 60
- Students: 3,500
- Location: Cape Town, Western Cape, South Africa; 33°58′20″S 18°28′53″E
- Campus: 9 Campuses Worldwide
- Colours: Light blue, Dark blue and White
- Website: www.etacollege.com

eta College is an international, private, single-purpose sports college founded in 1983. It has nine campuses, and an online learning facility. The national office is located in Cape Town. Its purpose is to provide education for fitness sport and recreation needs. The language of instruction is English.

== History ==
eta College was initiated as Exercise Teachers Academy in 1983 by Professor Tim Noakes, Malcolm Marrisson, Rob Cowling and Linda Halliday to meet the education needs of the fast developing health and fitness industry at that time. During this time, it was run by Malcolm Marrisson and for several years mentored by Professor Tim Noakes. In 1994 the two current directors, Linda Halliday and Dr Steve Harris took over the Exercise Teachers Academy and began to grow it as a college. Since the early nineties, the college has developed into a highly respected national education provider, offering occupationally based learning towards registered qualifications.

At the time that the new eta College was emerging, new legislation and regulations that governed South African education were brought about. These regulatory changes have had a big impact on education in sport and have brought with them greater demands for rigorous quality assurance in education.

== Campus ==
The head office or Centre for Academic Development (CAD) is based at the Western Province Cricket Club in Rondebosch. This campus hosts classes for full-time courses as well as part-time courses. The Distance Learning office, as well as the Special Projects office are located here. Other campuses exist in:

- Bloemfontein
- Cape Town
- Durban
- East London
- George
- Gqeberha
- Johannesburg
- Mauritius
- Pretoria
- Stellenbosch

== Courses ==
- Diploma in Coaching Science
- Diploma in Fitness Studies
- Diploma in Sports Management
- Certificate in Coaching Science
- Certificate in Fitness Studies
- Certificate in Sports Management

== Online/distance learning ==
The eta College offers an online learning program that can be completed anywhere in the world.

== Students and staff ==
As of 2013, over 3500 students were enrolled in eta College courses around the world. The ratio between male and female students is approximately 60/40. There have been over 5000 students enrolled in full-time, part-time and short course education at the college over the past 10 years.

eta College employs approximately 60 staff members including facilitators, administrative and academic staff.

== Affiliations ==
eta College is a member of the Cape Higher Education Consortium, DHET, REPPSA, SSISA, APPETD, CATHSSETA, ETDPSETA, and affiliated to College SA, Sharks, Blue Bulls Rugby Union, Stellenbosch Rugby Academy, WPCC, JR School Mauritius, Core Direction Dubai and Virgin Active.

== Notable alumni ==
- Olympic Gold medalist swimmer, Natalie Du Toit
- Ex-Sharks Captain & Springbok Rugby Player, Keegan Daniel
- Current Sharks Rugby Player, Sbu’ Sithole
- 1995 Springbok and World Cup winner, Chester Williams
- Former Bafana Bafana coach, Gordon Igesund

== Notable projects ==
- Sponsor of the SSISA Youth Talent Identity and Development Conference

== See also ==
- List of universities in South Africa
- Education in South Africa
