= NSDS =

NSDS may stand for:

- North Sydney Demonstration School
- National Skills Development Strategy
- Naval Service Diving Section
