= Sector Education and Training Authority =

Vocational skills training organization in South Africa

Sector Education and Training Authority (SETA), is the vocational skills training organization in South Africa. As of March 2011, there have been 21 SETAs. Each SETA is responsible for managing and creating learnerships, internships, unit-based skills programmes, and apprenticeships within its jurisdiction. Every industry and occupation in South Africa is covered by one of the 21 SETAs.

== History ==
In 1996 experts agreed that South Africa required little short of a skills revolution to survive in a highly competitive global marketplace. Thus, in 1998 the South African Parliament ratified the Skills Development Act. The act defined a new Sector Training and Education Authority (SETA) system. The goal was to develop a series of sector skills plans within a clearly defined framework of the National Skills Development Strategy.

On April 29, 2010, Higher Education and Training Minister, Dr Blade Nzimande, gave a statement detailing the public release of the proposed new SETA landscape. This new landscape reduced the then current 23 SETAs down to 21 SETAs.
