= Skills Development Act, 1998 =

Law of South Africa

The Skills Development Act 97 of 1998 is a law enacted in South Africa in 1998.

== Vision ==
This feign was promulgated by authority in 1998, in the center of peak levels of unemployment, sad levels of investment in the South African labour market, pronounced disparities in proceeds distribution, inequality of chance as a conclusion of apartheid and poverty. (Brendan and Down, 2000). Through this Act, the rule intended to deliver two central priorities, i.e. the basic to rally skills and proliferate productivity in tell to compete productively in the universal economy, and the hardship to transpose apartheid imbalances and to generate a new inclusive and organized the world (Mpilo Mthethwa, 2014).

== Amendments ==
IMPLEMENTATION & AMENDMENTS - Update 2016

- Signed in: ACT NO. 97 - 20 October 1998 [Date of commencement of s. 1: 2 February 1999]
- Skills Development Amendment Act 31 of 2003 [with effect from 14 November 2003]
- Skills Development Amendment Act 37 of 2008 [with effect from 6 April 2009]
- Skills Development Amendment Published 3 December 2012 - Came into effect 1 April 2013
- ---Business Unity South Africa (BUSA) won Labour Court's judgment on Friday 21 August 2015 declared both regulations to be invalid‚ and it set them aside with effect from March 31, 2016.
- ---The Court declared Regulations 3(11) and 4(4) of the 2012 Grant Regulations to be invalid, and it set them aside. However, it suspended the effect of that order until 31 March 2016.
- ---The Minister of DHET appealed against this that was not pursued, and on 15 April 2016 it has lapsed with an effective of 1 April 2016. (Cancelling the previous amendment of 2012)

== Purposes of the Skills Development Act ==
In line with the overall government objectives set out above, the purposes of the Act are as follows (Sec. 2(1)):

- to develop the skills of the South African workforce - to improve the quality of life of workers, their prospects of work and labour mobility; to improve productivity in the workplace and the competitiveness of employers; to promote self-employment; and to improve the delivery of social services;
- to increase the levels of investment in education and training in the labour market and to increase the return on that investment;
- to encourage employers - to use the workplace as an active learning environment; to provide employees with the opportunities to acquire new skills; to provide opportunities for new entrants to the labour market to gain work experience; to employ persons who find it difficult to be employed;
- to encourage workers to participate in learning programmes;
- to improve the employment prospects of persons previously disadvantaged by unfair discrimination and to redress those disadvantages through training and education;
- to ensure the quality of learning in and for the workplace;
- to assist - work-seekers to find work; retrenched workers to re-enter the labour market; employers to find qualified employees;
- to provide and regulate employment services.

The Republic of South Africa defines skills development as the following:

To provide an institutional framework to devise and implement national, sector and workplace strategies to develop and improve the skills of the South African work force; to integrate those strategies within the National Qualifications Framework contemplated in the South African Qualifications Authority Act, 1995; to provide for: learnerships that lead to recognised occupational qualifications; to provide financing of skills development by means of a levy-grant scheme and a National Skills Fund; to provide for and regulate employment services; and to provide for matters connected therewith.

== Method ==
=== Key Stakeholders and their roles ===
To give effect to its transformational goals, the government created a platform for all stakeholders to give input in the implementation of the Act in order to protect their interests, while discharging their respective responsibilities to their constituencies. The government also created various key institutions as vehicles for the fulfillment of its goals. Finally, the government provided for the financing of the activities associated with skills development via the Skills Development Levies Act 9 of 1999. Key stakeholders in the successful implementation of the Act are:

Government:

==== Organized Labour ====
Organised Labour participates at all three levels of implementation. At a strategic level, organised labour forms part of the National Skills Authority that advises the department of labour on policy and strategy formulation. At sector level, organized labour participates in the Sector Education Training Authorities (SETA) that design and implement sector specific skills plans. At company level, labour participates in the formulation of workplace skills plans and reports, which address both company and sector training needs. Organized labour secures the growth and employability of their members by participating in the various structures.

==== Organised business ====
Business mirrors the participation of organised labour at all three levels of implementation. In addition, however, organised business finance the implementation of skills plans through payment of levies. According to the CEO of the Forestry Sector Mr. Mkhwanazi, (July 20, 2007) 50% of the levies are paid to all participating companies on submission of the workplace skills plans and implementation reports. In addition as much as 20% of the levies are disbursed to those employers who implement learnerships and other skills programs identified as priority in each sector. 10% of the levies are used for the running of the SETAs. Improving current skills levels and creation of new skills through learnerships increases “productivity which is crucial to building internationally competitive industries and sustaining and expanding employment”. (Strong, 2000)

=== Institutions Created by the Act ===
==== The National Skills Authority (“NSA”) ====
The NSA advises the Minister of Labour on the formulation and implementation of the national skills strategy and policy, implementation guidelines of the above, and allocation of subsidies from the National Skills Fund. The NSA also liaises with the SETAs and reports progress on implementation of skills plans to the Minister.

==== Sector Education and Training Authorities (SETAs) ====
SETAs receive 80% of the levies paid by companies. SETAs develop sector skills plan in line with the national skills development strategy. They approve the workplace skills plans submitted by organizations in their sectors. SETAs also promote and establish learnerships. Finally, SETAs disburse grants to participating companies, provided that those companies have submitted workplace skills plans and implementation reports to the SETA by 30 April every year.

== Conclusion ==
This legislation affords all key stakeholders the platform and opportunity to participate in a way in which it helps rebuild the country. Through this legislation, skills can be developed in the workforce and help the quality of life of the workers in South Africa.

== Reference list ==
=== Legislation ===
1. The Skills Development Act (1998) Accessed 20 July 2007

=== Other references ===
1. Brendan, B., Down, N., (2000) "The Skills Development Act: transforming education and training for workers." S A Labour Bulletin 24(2) p 6 – 11.
2. Erasmus, B.J.& van Dyk, P.S. (2005) Training Management in South Africa. Cape Town, Oxford University Press.
3. Grobler, P.A., Wärnich, S., Carrell, M.R., Elbert, N.F. & Hatfield, R.D. (2006) Human Resource Management in South Africa. 3rd ed. London, Thomson Learning.
4. Strong, L., (2000) "New Skills Legislation replaces apprenticeships." People Dynamics 18(5) p15 – 19.
5. https://web.archive.org/web/20120127064116/http://www.paralegaladvice.org.za/docs/chap06/23.html Accessed 4 April 2012
6. Comprehensive Summary of Skills Development Act'
