= Hyron Andrews =

South African rugby union player (1995–2026)

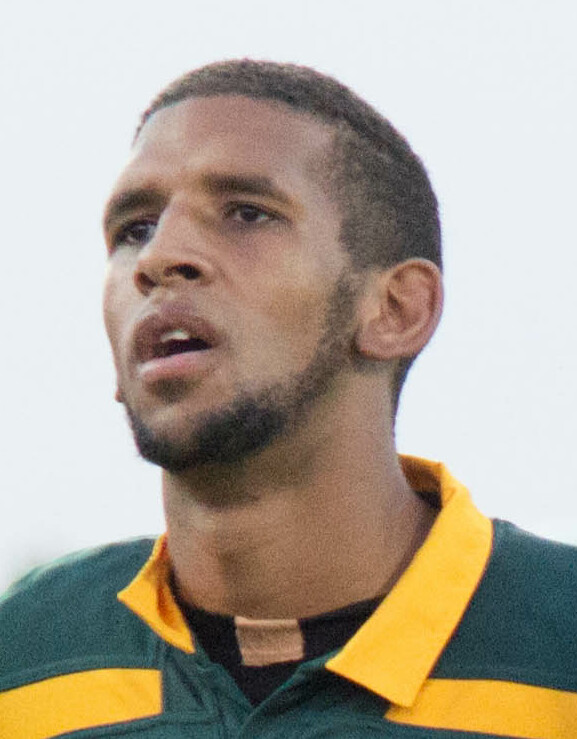
- Andrews in 2015
- Full name: Hyron Diego Andrews
- Born: 6 July 1995 Paarl, South Africa
- Died: 16 October 2026 (aged 31) Sainte-Marie-de-Ré, France
- Height: 2.03 m (6 ft 8 in)
- Weight: 108 kg (17 st 0 lb; 238 lb)
- School: Hoërskool Garsfontein, Pretoria
- University: Eta College

Rugby union career
- Position: Lock
Youth career
- 2011–2013: Blue Bulls
- 2014–2016: Sharks
Senior career
Years	Team	Apps	(Points)
2015–2018	Sharks XV	26	(30)
2016–2024	Sharks	77	(15)
2017–2024	Sharks (Currie Cup)	28	(5)
2024–2026	Sale Sharks	45	(5)
2026	Lions	3	(0)
- Correct as of 16 October 2026
International career
Years	Team	Apps	(Points)
2012	South Africa Schools	0	(0)
2015	South Africa Under-20	2	(0)
- Correct as of 16 October 2026

Hyron Diego Andrews (6 July 1995 – 16 October 2026) was a South African rugby union player for the Sharks and the Lions in the United Rugby Championship. He also played for the Sale Sharks in Premiership Rugby in England. His regular position was lock.

== Career ==
At high school level, Andrews represented the Blue Bulls at the Under-16 Grant Khomo Week in 2011 and at the premier South African high school rugby competition, the Under-18 Craven Week, in both 2012 and 2013. He made three appearances on both occasions and scored two tries in the 2013 competition. He was also named in the South Africa Schools side in 2012, but failed to make any appearances.

Andrews joined the Sharks Academy after finishing high school and represented the Sharks U19 side in the 2014 Under-19 Provincial Championship, starting all thirteen of their matches as they reached the semi-final of the competition, where they were defeated 20–43 by the Blue Bulls U19.

He made his first class debut for the Sharks XV on 21 March 2015, playing off the bench in their 2015 Vodacom Cup match against the Border Bulldogs in Durban, helping them to a 53–0 victory. He started their next four matches in the competition as the Sharks XV finished sixth in the Southern Section of the competition.

Andrews was named in a 37-man training squad for the South Africa national under-20 rugby union team and was included in the squad that embarked on a two-match tour of Argentina. He was an unused replacement in their 25–22 victory over Argentina, but started their 39–28 victory a few days later.

Upon the team's return, Andrews was named in the final squad for the 2015 World Rugby Under 20 Championship. He didn't get any game time in their first of three matches in Pool B of the competition, a 33–5 win against hosts Italy, but was used as a replacement in their 40–8 win against Samoa and their 46–13 win over Australia to help South Africa finish top of Pool B to qualify for the semi-finals with the best record pool stage of all the teams in the competition. He was named on the bench for their semi-final match against England, but did not come on as South Africa lost 20–28 to be eliminated from the competition by England for the second year in succession. He also didn't feature in their third-place play-off match against France, which South Africa won 31–18 to secure third place in the competition.

He joined Premiership Rugby club Sale Sharks on a short-term loan in February 2024. However, Andrews would stay with Sale on a one-year contract extension until the end of the 2024–2025 season.

== Death ==
On 16 October 2026, Andrews was found dead in the Lions team hotel after suffering a fall, the day before the team were due to play La Rochelle in the opening round of the Champions Cup. He was 31. An autopsy later revealed that he had died from an aortic dissection. The Lions described him as a valued member of the squad and expressed condolences to his wife, Maighlin, and their two young sons. The team also stated they would proceed with their scheduled Champions Cup fixture in honour of Hyron.
