= Emile Temperman =

South African rugby union player

- Full name: Emile Nicolaas George Temperman
- Born: 5 December 1991 (age 34) Nylstroom, South Africa
- Height: 1.73 m (5 ft 8 in)
- Weight: 82 kg (12 st 13 lb; 181 lb)
- School: Hoërskool Nelspruit
- University: University of Pretoria

Rugby union career
- Position: Scrum-half
- Current team: Pumas
Youth career
- 2008–2009: Pumas
- 2010: SWD Eagles
- 2012: Blue Bulls
Amateur team(s)
Years	Team	Apps	(Points)
2011–2015	UP Tuks	20	(5)
Senior career
Years	Team	Apps	(Points)
2013	Blue Bulls	1	(0)
2016–2017	Pumas	30	(15)
- Correct as of 18 May 2018

Emile Nicolaas George Temperman (born 5 December 1991) is a South African rugby union player who most recently played for the Pumas. His regular position is scrum-half.

== Rugby career ==
=== 2008–2009: Schoolboy rugby ===
Temperman was born in Nylstroom, but grew up in Frankfort and Nelspruit. Playing for Hoërskool Nelspruit, he was selected to represent the Pumas in the premier South African high school rugby union competition, the Under-18 Craven Week, in both 2008 and 2009.

=== 2010: SWD Eagles ===
After high school, Temperman moved to George, where he joined the SWD Eagles rugby team. He made eight appearances for the SWD U19 team in the 2010 Under-19 Provincial Championship, scoring tries in matches against Griquas U19, Pumas U19 and Boland U19, helping the team finish third in Group B to qualify for the play-offs. He started their 27–20 victory over Falcons U19 in the semi-finals, but missed out on the final, where the team missed out on silverware by losing to Eastern Province U19. He also made a single appearance for their Under-21 team against the Pumas U21s.

=== 2011–2015: UP Tuks and Blue Bulls ===
Temperman returned north for the 2011 season, joining the University of Pretoria's rugby team, UP Tuks. He was named in their squad for the 2011 Varsity Cup, but failed to appear in the competition. His next action in a national competition came in the latter half of 2012, as he represented the Blue Bulls U21 team in the Under-21 Provincial Championship. He made twelve appearances – ten of those as a replacement – and scored a try in their match against Leopards U21 as the team made it all the way to the final of the competition. Temperman played off the bench in their 22–13 victory over Western Province U21 in the final to help the team secure the title.

Temperman featured for UP Tuks in the next three editions of the Varsity Cup. He made six appearances in the 2013 competition, scoring a try in a 52–0 win over Gauteng rivals Wits on their way to the final, where Temperman featured for the final 17 minutes of a 44–5 victory over Maties to win the title for their second consecutive season. He also made his first class debut during this season, coming on as a replacement in the Blue Bulls' 54–26 victory over the Golden Lions in the 2013 Vodacom Cup.

Temperman played in seven matches of UP Tuks' 2014 Varsity Cup disappointing campaign, which saw them miss out on a semi-final spot after finishing in sixth position, and a further seven in 2015, where an improved showing saw the team finish top of the log before losing in the semi-finals against NWU Pukke. Temperman was mainly utilised as a replacement during his three Varsity Cup campaigns, making just one start, and he was not selected to represent the Blue Bulls in any further matches.

=== 2016–present: Pumas ===
For 2016, Temperman returned to Nelspruit, joining the Pumas prior to their 2016 Currie Cup qualification campaign. He made his first start in first class rugby in their opening match of the season, a 9–12 defeat to the Falcons. He appeared regularly for the Pumas throughout the campaign, making a total of five starts and eight appearances as a replacement in their 14 matches, as his side finished the competition in fourth position to secure qualification to the Currie Cup Premier Division. He made his debut in the Currie Cup proper on 5 August 2016, coming on as a replacement in their defeat to the Sharks, eventually appearing in all eight of the Pumas' matches in a poor season that saw the side finish second-bottom, with a single victory in their final match against the Eastern Province Kings.
