= Andrew du Plessis =

South African rugby union player

- Full name: Andrew Terblanche du Plessis
- Born: 14 January 1995 (age 31) Welkom, South Africa
- Height: 1.79 m (5 ft 10 1/2 in)
- Weight: 104 kg (229 lb; 16 st 5 lb)
- School: Grey College

Rugby union career
- Position: Hooker
- Current team: Sharks / Sharks XV
Youth career
- 2008–2013: Free State Cheetahs
- 2014–2016: Sharks
Senior career
| Years | Team | Apps | (Points) |
| 2015–2018 | Sharks XV | 14 | (10) |
| 2017 | Sharks | 1 | (0) |
| 2017 | → Griffons | 10 | (5) |
- Correct as of 25 August 2018

Andrew Terblanche du Plessis (born 14 January 1995) is a South African rugby union player who last played for the Sharks in the Currie Cup and the Sharks XV in the Rugby Challenge. His regular position is hooker.
