= Cape Higher Education Consortium =

South African university association

- CHEC
- Type: Association of universities
- Location: Western Cape, South Africa
- Members: 4
- Website: www.chec.ac.za

The Cape Higher Education Consortium (CHEC) is an association whose members are the four universities in the Western Cape province of South Africa. It describes itself as "A Network of Learning for the Western Cape".

It was originally registered as the Western Cape Tertiary Institutions Trust in August 1993, and was known as the "Adamastor Trust". In 2002 the vice-chancellors of the member institutions signed a compact to lay down the visions and principles of collaboration, and to form a replacement institution, which was CHEC.

The primary purpose of the trust is to facilitate co-operation between the participating institutions, and to establish the Western Cape as a strong area for tertiary education. The board of directors consists of one vice-rector or deputy vice-chancellor nominated by each institution.

The trust receives and administers donations and grants for collaborative projects. One of its major projects is CALICO (the Cape Library Consortium) which unified the library computer systems of the four member institutions so that searches could be made across all the libraries, and making the processing of inter-library loans easier.

== Members ==
- Cape Peninsula University of Technology
- University of Cape Town
- University of Stellenbosch
- University of the Western Cape
