= Marco Mason =

South African rugby union player

- Full name: Frederick Jacobus Marthinus Mason
- Born: 21 March 1992 (age 34) Potgietersrus, South Africa
- Height: 1.77 m (5 ft 9 1/2 in)
- Weight: 83 kg (183 lb; 13 st 1 lb)
- School: Hoërskool Piet Potgieter
- University: University of the Free State

Rugby union career
- Position: Fullback
- Current team: Santboiana
Youth career
- 2010: Limpopo Blue Bulls
- 2011–2013: Free State Cheetahs
Senior career
Years	Team	Apps	(Points)
2012	Free State XV	7	(22)
2017	Free State XV	8	(79)
2017	Free State Cheetahs	2	(7)
- Correct as of 4 September 2018

Frederick Jacobus Marthinus 'Marco' Mason (born 21 March 1992) is a South African rugby union player for Santboiana in the División de Honor in Spain. He previously played first class rugby for the Free State Cheetahs in the Currie Cup and the Free State XV in the Rugby Challenge in 2012 and 2017. His regular position is fullback.
