= College SA =

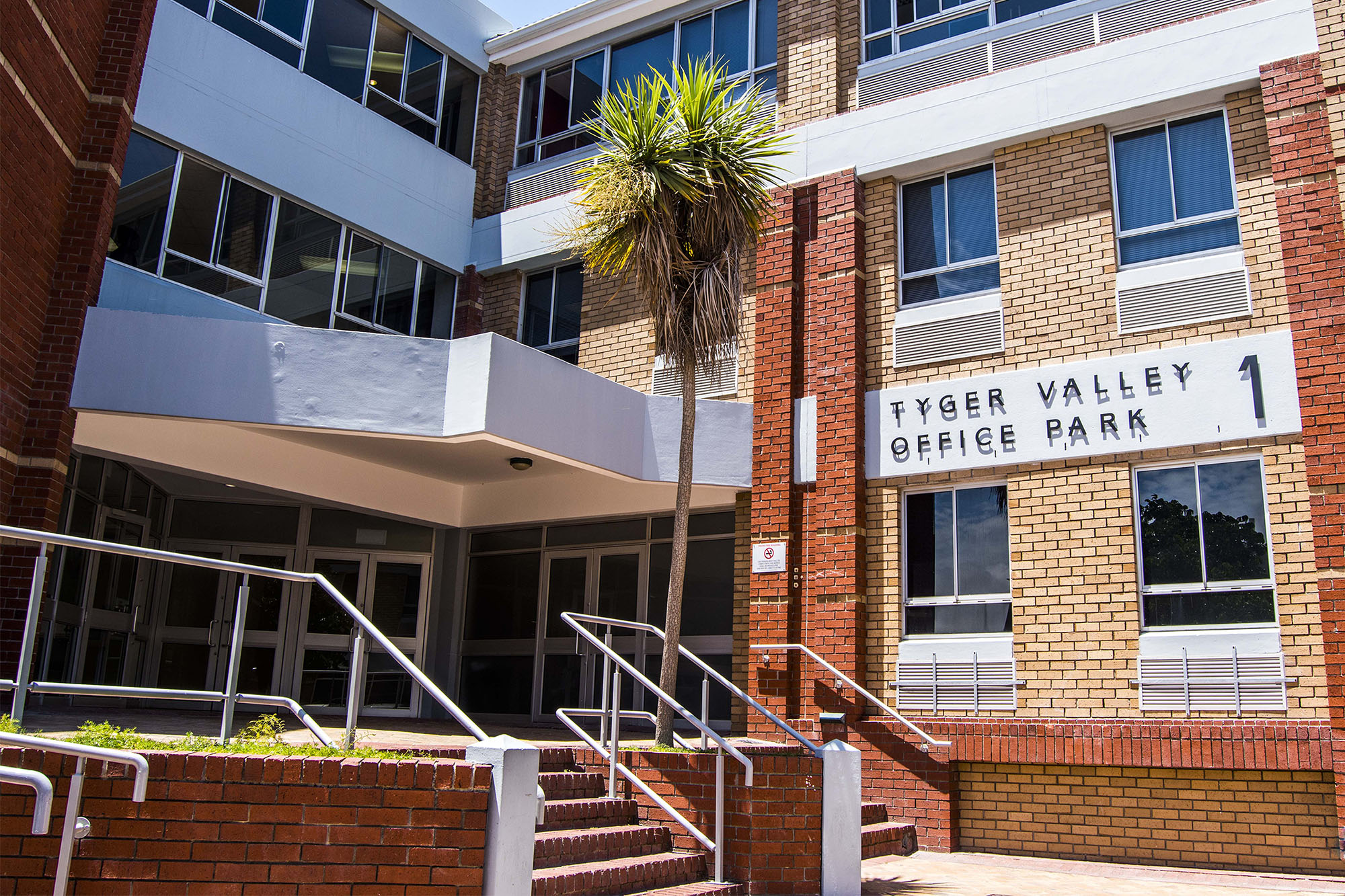
Front entrance to College SA, Cape Town, South Africa

College SA is a Distance Learning Private and Business College, located in Centurion, South Africa. College SA offers Technical and Vocational Education and Training (TVET) to students, both in South Africa and internationally.

== History ==
College SA was initially established in partnership with the Curro School Group, as Curro College in 2007. In 2008, the Curro School Partners sold their shares, and Curro College became College SA.

In 2016 the majority shareholding in the company was sold to JSE listed RECM and Calibre Limited (RAC). During this time the College was relocated from Bellville South to its current location in Tygervalley Bellville.

In 2019, Optimi acquired College SA in a bid to broaden its offering in the distance learning market.

The Optimi group provides offerings in 3 divisions: Impaq, Teach360, and College SA. Together, these divisions service over 300 000 learners per annum.

College SA provides accessible occupational education and skills training for adult learners and organisations in South Africa.

== Accreditation and registration ==
College SA, a registered trademark of Optimi College Pty (Ltd), Reg no: 2007/017012/07, is member of the Optimi Group and is provisionally registered with the Department of Higher Education and Training (DHET), Reg no: 2009/ FE07/099.

College SA is accredited by the following accrediting/professional bodies:

- Umalusi which offers Engineering/Technical studies N1-N3. Accreditation Number is: 15 FET02 00025
- Fasset for Bookkeeping and Accounting qualifications
- ICB Financial Accounting; Public Sector Accounting; Business Management; Entrepreneurship; Office Administration
- SABPP who offer a Human Resource Management registered on the National Qualifications Framework (NQF)
- CIMA offers CIMA's Certificate in Business Accounting
- Microsoft who offers the following pathways: Microsoft Technical Associate (MTA) certifications; MCSA Microsoft Windows 8; MCSA & MCSE Microsoft Windows Server; MCSA & MCSE Microsoft SQL Server; MCSD Microsoft Web & Store Applications
- CompTIA for CompTIA A+ and Network+ certifications.

== Mode of delivery ==
College SA is a distance learning provider. All of their courses are offered via correspondence, and are available to students all over South Africa, as well as international students. Academic support is provided to students by an online classroom and course coordinators.

== Location ==
College SA located in Gauteng, South Africa.
