= National Skills Development Strategy Documents =

The National Skills Development Strategy Document is a South African policy on skills development for the 2011 to 2016 period.

== History ==
=== NSDS I ===
2001 to 2005: The emphasis was placed on equality and the need to cultivate lifelong learning in a workplace environment. Learning aimed to be demand-driven based on the needs of employees in both the public and private sectors. The effectiveness of delivery was essential in order to ensure desired outcomes were achieved.

=== NSDS II ===
2005 to 2010: The emphasis in NSDS II was placed again on equity, quality training and skills development in the workplace. The need for the promotion of employability was identified. NSDS II also identified the need for assisting designated groups to gain knowledge and experience in a workplace environment in order to gain critical skills. The quality of the provision was identified as a problem area needing improvement.

=== NSDS III ===
Current: In NSDS 3 the emphasis swings in the direction of institutional learning linked to occupationally directed programmes. It promotes the growth of FET Colleges in order to address national skills needs. Better use of workplace skills programmes is encouraged as is the use of worker-initiated training initiatives. Public sector improved service delivery is seen as an imperative. The issue of language and literacy is of concern in terms of enabling additional learning.
