= 2016 Currie Cup Premier Division =

Domestic rugby union competition

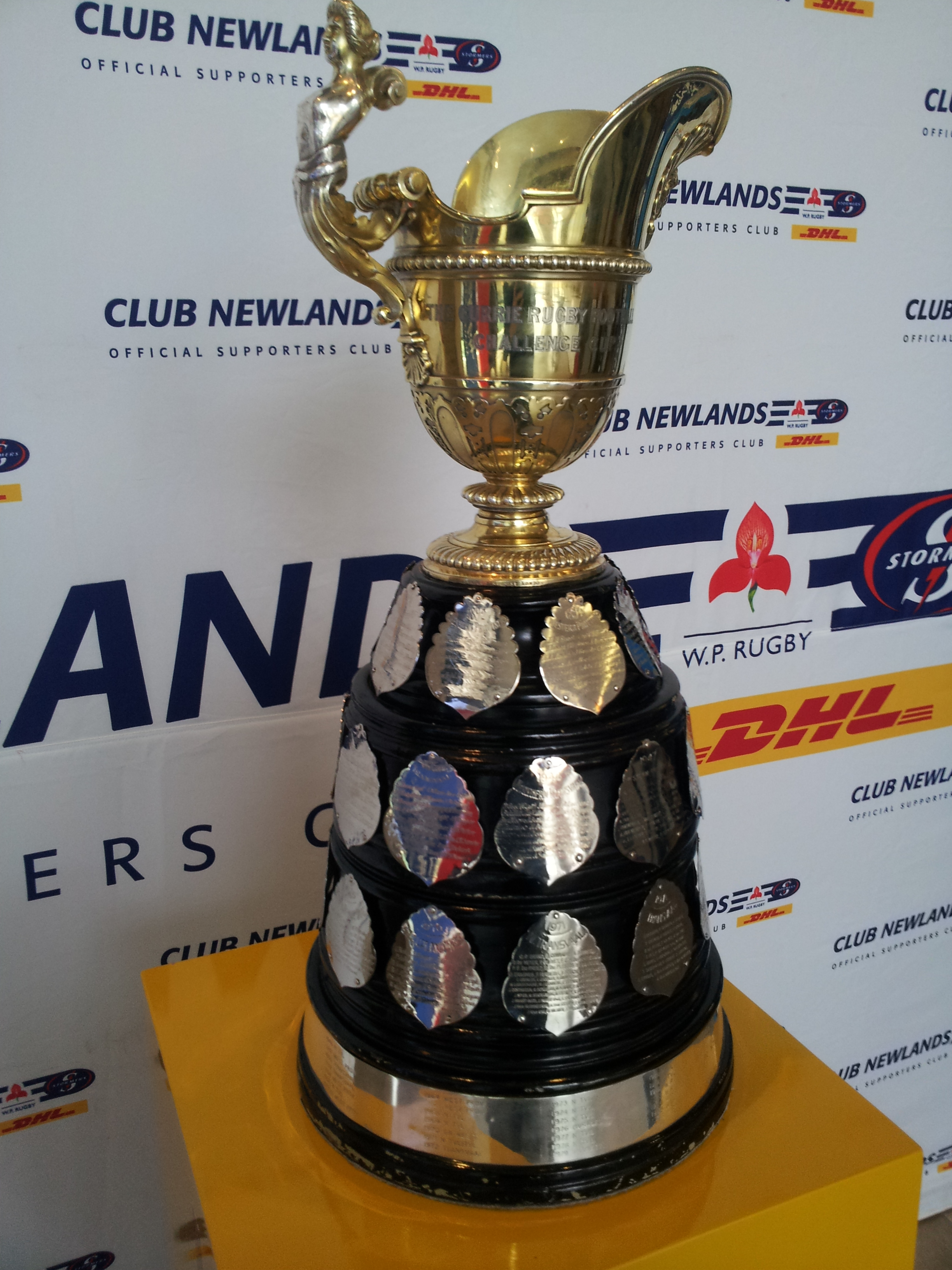
- The Currie Cup in 2012
- Countries: South Africa
- Date: 5 August – 22 October 2016
- Champions: Free State Cheetahs (5th title)
- Runners-up: Blue Bulls
- Relegated: Boland Cavaliers; Eastern Province Kings
- Matches played: 39
- Tries scored: 321 (average 8.2 per match)
- Top point scorer: Tian Schoeman (146)
- Top try scorer: Frank Herne, Huw Jones, Howard Mnisi, Kwagga Smith and Jamba Ulengo (7)

The 2016 Currie Cup Premier Division was the top tier of the second stage of the 2016 Currie Cup, the 78th edition of this annual South African rugby union competition organised by the South African Rugby Union. It was played between 5 August and 22 October 2016 and featured nine teams that qualified through the 2016 Currie Cup qualification competition.

The competition was won by the Free State Cheetahs for the fifth time in their history; they beat the Blue Bulls 36–16 in the final played on 22 October 2016.

The competition was reduced to seven teams for 2017, resulting in the Boland Cavaliers and Eastern Province Kings being relegated to the 2017 Currie Cup First Division.

== Competition rules and information ==
There are nine participating teams in the 2016 Currie Cup Premier Division.

=== Qualification ===
The six franchise teams automatically qualified for the 2016 Currie Cup Premier Division, and were joined by the three highest-placed non-franchise teams from the 2016 Currie Cup qualification stage. Points will not be carried over to the Premier Division.

=== Regular season and title playoffs ===
The nine teams that qualified for the Premier Division will play against each other over the course of the competition, either at home or away. Teams will receive four points for a win and two points for a draw. Bonus points will be awarded to teams that score four or more tries in a game, as well as to teams that lose a match by seven points or less. Teams will be ranked by log points, then points difference (points scored less points conceded).

The top four teams will qualify for the semifinals, which will be followed by a final.

=== Relegation ===
In March 2017, the South African Rugby Union decided to reduce the competition to seven teams for 2017 Currie Cup Premier Division. The seven teams with the best record over the past five years were selected to remain in the Premier Division, which resulted in the Boland Cavaliers and Eastern Province Kings being relegated to the 2017 Currie Cup First Division.

== Teams ==
The teams that qualified for the 2016 Currie Cup Premier Division are:

Location of teams in the 2016 Currie Cup Premier Division

=== Team Listing ===
2016 Currie Cup Premier Division teams
Team	Sponsored Name	Stadium/s	Sponsored Name
Blue Bulls	Vodacom Blue Bulls	Loftus Versfeld, Pretoria	Loftus Versfeld
Boland Cavaliers	Boland Cavaliers	Boland Stadium, Wellington	Boland Stadium
Eastern Province Kings	Eastern Province Kings	Nelson Mandela Bay Stadium, Port Elizabeth	Nelson Mandela Bay Stadium
Free State Cheetahs	Toyota Free State Cheetahs	Free State Stadium, Bloemfontein	Free State Stadium
Golden Lions	Xerox Golden Lions	Ellis Park Stadium, Johannesburg	Emirates Airline Park
Griquas	Griquas	Griqua Park, Kimberley	Griqua Park
Pumas	Steval Pumas	Mbombela Stadium, Mbombela	Mbombela Stadium
Sharks	Cell C Sharks	Kings Park Stadium, Durban	Growthpoint Kings Park
Western Province	DHL Western Province	Newlands Stadium, Cape Town	DHL Newlands

== Standings ==
The final log for the 2016 Currie Cup Premier Division was: (Note: According to the match report summary on the South African Rugby Union website, the Sharks scored five tries in their match against Griquas; however, according to the detailed scorecard, they scored six tries. Similarly, the match report summary indicates that the Blue Bulls scored eight tries in their match against Griquas, while the detailed scorecard lists nine tries. These missing tries are also missing from the log on the official website, and have been added into the log below.)

2016 Currie Cup Premier Division log
Pos	Team	Pld	W	D	L	PF	PA	PD	TF	TA	TB	LB	Pts	Qualification
1	Free State Cheetahs	8	8	0	0	366	181	+185	49	18	7	0	39	Semi-finals
2	Blue Bulls	8	6	0	2	310	207	+103	40	26	5	1	30	Semi-finals
3	Western Province	8	5	0	3	266	250	+16	35	29	6	1	27	Semi-finals
4	Golden Lions	8	5	0	3	355	191	+164	49	23	5	1	26	Semi-finals
5	Sharks	8	5	0	3	272	173	+99	33	21	4	1	25	
6	Griquas	8	4	0	4	265	323	−58	33	43	5	0	21	
7	Boland Cavaliers	8	2	0	6	177	301	−124	24	41	3	1	12	Relegated
8	Pumas	8	1	0	7	178	321	−143	24	43	4	2	10	
9	Eastern Province Kings	8	0	0	8	137	379	−242	16	59	1	0	1	Relegated

Rules for classification: 4 points for a win; 2 points for a draw; 1 bonus point for a loss by seven points or less; 1 bonus point for scoring four or more tries in a match

=== Round-by-round ===
The table below shows a team's progression throughout the season. For each round, each team's cumulative points total is shown with the overall log position in brackets.

Team Progression – 2016 Currie Cup Premier Division
Team	R1	R2	R3	R4	R1 (Note: The Griquas v Eastern Province Kings from Round One was rescheduled between Rounds Four and Five.)	R5	R6	R7	R8	R9	SF	F
Free State Cheetahs	5 (1st)	10 (1st)	14 (2nd)	14 (2nd)	14 (2nd)	19 (2nd)	24 (1st)	29 (1st)	34 (1st)	39 (1st)	Won	Won
Blue Bulls	5 (3rd)	5 (4th)	10 (3rd)	11 (4th)	11 (5th)	15 (3rd)	20 (3rd)	25 (3rd)	30 (2nd)	30 (2nd)	Won	Lost
Western Province	1 (4th)	1 (6th)	2 (7th)	7 (6th)	7 (6th)	12 (6th)	13 (6th)	18 (5th)	23 (4th)	27 (3rd)	Lost	—N/a
Golden Lions	0 (5th)	5 (3rd)	7 (4th)	12 (3rd)	12 (4th)	12 (5th)	17 (5th)	17 (6th)	22 (5th)	26 (4th)	Lost	—N/a
Sharks	5 (2nd)	10 (2nd)	15 (1st)	19 (1st)	19 (1st)	20 (1st)	20 (2nd)	25 (2nd)	25 (3rd)	25 (5th)	—N/a	—N/a
Griquas	0 (5th)	0 (9th)	4 (6th)	9 (5th)	14 (3rd)	14 (4th)	19 (4th)	19 (4th)	20 (6th)	21 (6th)	—N/a	—N/a
Boland Cavaliers	0 (9th)	5 (5th)	5 (5th)	5 (7th)	5 (7th)	9 (7th)	9 (7th)	9 (7th)	10 (7th)	12 (7th)	—N/a	—N/a
Pumas	0 (8th)	1 (7th)	1 (9th)	3 (8th)	3 (8th)	5 (8th)	5 (8th)	5 (8th)	5 (8th)	10 (8th)	—N/a	—N/a
Eastern Province Kings	0 (5th)	0 (8th)	1 (8th)	1 (9th)	1 (9th)	1 (9th)	1 (9th)	1 (9th)	1 (9th)	1 (9th)	—N/a	—N/a
Key:	win	draw	loss	bye								

== Matches ==
The following matches were played in the 2016 Currie Cup Premier Division:

=== Round one ===
The 2016 Currie Cup Premier Division got off to a turbulent start after the Lions reached the 2016 Super Rugby final and requested that the Golden Lions be given a bye in Round One of the competition. In addition, the Eastern Province Kings were liquidated the day before the competition was due to kick off. They were reformed with the help of their local municipal council, but with no coaches or players in place, their Round One match against Griquas was also postponed. On the field, the action got underway in Pretoria, where the Blue Bulls beat 2015 losing finalists Western Province 45–26. They scored six tries, with Tian Schoeman kicking 15 points, while Western Province responded with four tries, all in the final twenty minutes of the match. In the other match played on the Friday evening, the Sharks beat the Pumas 33–10 in Nelspruit, outscoring the hosts by five tries to one. The biggest victory of the weekend came in the Saturday match, with the Free State Cheetahs beating Boland Cavaliers 44–16 in Wellington, also scoring five tries to one to go top of the log. Fred Zeilinga scored nineteen points in that match, the most by any player in Round One.

5 August 2016	Blue Bulls	45–26	Western Province	Loftus Versfeld, Pretoria
17:10	Try: Piet van Zyl 18'; Jason Jenkins 32'; Marvin Orie 34'; Jade Stighling 47'; Jamba Ulengo 54'; Bjorn Basson 79'; Con: Tian Schoeman 20', 33', 36', 48', 55', 80' (6/6); Pen: Tian Schoeman 7' (1/1)	Report; Scoreboard	Try: Johnny Kôtze 61'; Leolin Zas 70'; Huw Jones 71'; Scott van Breda 77'; Con: Brandon Thomson 62', 71', 77' (3/4); Pen: Robert du Preez (0/1); Drop: Brandon Thomson (0/1)	Attendance: 3,498; Referee: Stuart Berry

5 August 2016	Pumas	10–33	Sharks	Mbombela Stadium, Mbombela
19:20	Try: Frank Herne 27'; Con: Francois Brummer 28' (1/1); Pen: Francois Brummer 4' (1/1)	Report; Scoreboard	Try: Franco Marais 13'; Odwa Ndungane 18'; S'bura Sithole 50'; Ruan Botha 66'; André Esterhuizen 72'; Con: Curwin Bosch 14', 19', 51', 73' (4/5); Pen: Curwin Bosch (0/1)	Attendance: 2,890; Referee: Pro Legoete

6 August 2016	Boland Cavaliers	16–44	Free State Cheetahs	Boland Stadium, Wellington
15:00	Try: Danwel Demas 68'; Con: Nico Scheepers 69' (1/1); Pen: Nico Scheepers 19', 26', 40' (3/3)	Report; Scoreboard	Try: Sergeal Petersen 9'; Raymond Rhule 47'; William Small-Smith 50'; Shaun Venter 55'; Francois Venter 78'; Con: Fred Zeilinga 10', 48', 51', 56', 79' (5/5); Pen: Fred Zeilinga 5', 44', 53' (3/4)	Attendance: 1,250; Referee: Rodney Boneparte

Bye/s: Eastern Province Kings, Golden Lions, Griquas

=== Round two ===
The Free State Cheetahs retained their spot at the top of the Currie Cup after outscoring the Blue Bulls by six tries to two in a 43–20 victory in their match in Bloemfontein, while the Sharks kept pace with them by also securing a bonus-point victory in their match against Griquas, scoring six tries in a 46–24 victory in Durban. The Golden Lions started their title defense in style, with lock Lourens Erasmus scoring a try just 8.5 seconds into their match against the Pumas, a new Currie Cup record for the fastest-ever try. The Golden Lions won the match 68–26 to move into third position on the log, scoring ten tries in the process, of which winger Anthony Volmink scored two. In the other match of the weekend, the Boland Cavaliers secured their first win of the season, winning 28–10 in their first match against the Eastern Province Kings in the Currie Cup Premier Division since 1999.

12 August 2016	Eastern Province Kings	10–28	Boland Cavaliers	Nelson Mandela Bay Stadium, Port Elizabeth
17:00	Try: Johann Tromp 74'; Con: Lungelo Gosa 75' (1/1); Pen: Kobus Marais 36' (1/3); Cards: Tazz Fuzani (yellow card) 18' to 28'; Alcino Izaacs (yellow card) 59' to 69'	Report; Scoreboard	Try: Sergio Torrens 24'; Zandré Jordaan 46'; Christopher Bosch 64'; Kenan Cronjé 69'; Con: Nico Scheepers 25', 47', 65', 70' (4/4); Pen: Nico Scheepers (0/1)	Attendance: 464; Referee: Rodney Boneparte

12 August 2016	Sharks	46–24	Griquas	Kings Park Stadium, Durban
19:10	Try: Etienne Oosthuizen 2'; S'bura Sithole 8'; André Esterhuizen 33'; Stefan Ungerer 40'; Tera Mtembu 60'; Jean Deysel 76'; Con: Curwin Bosch 3', 9', 34', 40', 77' (5/6); Pen: Curwin Bosch 27', 68' (2/2)	Report; Scoreboard	Try: Rudi van Rooyen 28'; Alshaun Bock 54'; JW Jonker 64'; Con: Clinton Swart 29', 55', 64' (3/3); Pen: Clinton Swart 21' (1/1); Cards: AJ le Roux (yellow card) 39' to 49'	Attendance: 9,659; Referee: Jaco van Heerden

13 August 2016	Golden Lions	68–26	Pumas	Ellis Park Stadium, Johannesburg
15:00	Try: Lourens Erasmus 1'; Jaco van der Walt 9'; Anthony Volmink 22', 78'; Cyle Brink 28'; Sylvian Mahuza 38'; Akker van der Merwe 45'; Howard Mnisi 49'; Koch Marx 63'; Marnitz Boshoff 71'; Con: Jaco van der Walt 2', 10', 23', 29', 39', 46' (6/7); Marnitz Boshoff 63', 72', 79' (3/3); Cards: Akker van der Merwe (yellow card) 7' to 17'; Jacques van Rooyen (yellow card) 11' to 22'	Report; Scoreboard	Try: Marlou van Niekerk 25'; Khwezi Mona 32'; Justin van Staden 55'; Devon Williams 81'; Con: Francois Brummer 26', 33', 82' (3/4); Pen: Francois Brummer (0/1)	Attendance: 2,730; Referee: Stuart Berry

13 August 2016	Free State Cheetahs	43–20	Blue Bulls	Free State Stadium, Bloemfontein
17:10	Try: Francois Venter 2'; Clayton Blommetjies 8'; Ox Nché 28'; Uzair Cassiem 55'; William Small-Smith 60'; Rayno Benjamin 74'; Con: Fred Zeilinga 3', 9', 29', 61' (4/5); Niel Marais 75' (1/1); Pen: Fred Zeilinga 40' (1/1)	Report; Scoreboard	Try: Jannes Kirsten 25'; Ruan Steenkamp 71'; Con: Tian Schoeman 26' (1/1); Joshua Stander 72' (1/1); Pen: Tian Schoeman 5', 50' (2/3)	Attendance: 14,251; Referee: Pro Legoete

Bye/s: Western Province

=== Round three ===
The Sharks secured their third consecutive bonus-points victory against the Boland Cavaliers in Wellington, scoring six tries in a 41–20 win to leap-frog the Free State Cheetahs into top spot on the log. Although the Cheetahs also won their third match in the competition – a 32–25 victory over Western Province with fly-half Fred Zeilinga contributing 22 points – their two tries were not enough to secure a bonus point. The Blue Bulls remained in third position on the log after a high-scoring victory over the Eastern Province Kings; two tries from Jamba Ulengo and 19 points from Tian Schoeman's boot helped the side to a 49–35 victory over an EP Kings side who secured their first log point of the season by scoring five tries of their own. In the other match, the Golden Lions lost their first match since the 2014 Currie Cup Final, with Kimberley-based side Griquas beating them 30–24.

19 August 2016	Boland Cavaliers	20–41	Sharks	Boland Stadium, Wellington
15:00	Try: Danwel Demas 48'; Sergio Torrens 61'; Ryan Nell 79'; Con: Theuns Kotzé 80' (1/3); Pen: Nico Scheepers 14' (1/2); Drop: Adriaan Carelse (0/1); Cards: Marnus Hugo (yellow card) 9' to 20'	Report; Scoreboard	Try: Odwa Ndungane 10'; Inny Radebe 16'; André Esterhuizen 28'; Chiliboy Ralepelle 37'; Hanco Venter 65'; Franco Marais 78'; Con: Curwin Bosch 11', 17', 38' (3/4); Garth April 65' (1/2); Pen: Curwin Bosch 23' (1/1)	Attendance: 1,000; Referee: Marius van der Westhuizen

19 August 2016	Western Province	25–32	Free State Cheetahs	Newlands Stadium, Cape Town
17:10	Try: Huw Jones 10'; Kobus van Wyk 27'; Leolin Zas 65'; Con: Brandon Thomson 11' (1/2); Robert du Preez 65' (1/1); Pen: Brandon Thomson 6', 33' (2/2)	Report; Scoreboard	Try: Nico Lee 21'; Tian Meyer 43'; Con: Fred Zeilinga 22', 44' (2/2); Pen: Fred Zeilinga 14', 17', 56', 60', 72', 79' (6/6)	Attendance: 6,533; Referee: Craig Joubert

19 August 2016	Blue Bulls	49–35	Eastern Province Kings	Loftus Versfeld, Pretoria
19:20	Try: Tian Schoeman 12'; Jamba Ulengo 19', 64'; Jannes Kirsten 28'; Bjorn Basson 32'; Burger Odendaal 59'; Joshua Stander 70'; Con: Tian Schoeman 13', 20', 29', 33', 60', 65', 71' (7/7); Cards: RG Snyman (yellow card) 32'	Report; Scoreboard	Try: Mike Willemse 1'; Berton Klaasen 5'; Johann Tromp 39'; Siviwe Soyizwapi 54'; Martin Bezuidenhout 67'; Con: Kobus Marais 2', 6' (2/4); Lungelo Gosa (0/1); Pen: Kobus Marais 24', 32' (2/2)	Attendance: 2,800; Referee: Rasta Rasivhenge

20 August 2016	Griquas	30–24	Golden Lions	Griqua Park, Kimberley
14:10	Try: AJ Coertzen 21'; Stephan Kotzé 30'; Rudi van Rooyen 50'; Con: Clinton Swart 22', 31', 50' (3/3); Pen: Clinton Swart 16', 25' (2/3); André Swarts 68' (1/1)	Report; Scoreboard	Try: Akker van der Merwe 1'; Howard Mnisi 34'; Cyle Brink 41'; Corné Fourie 74'; Con: Jaco van der Walt 2' (1/2); Marnitz Boshoff 42' (1/2); Pen: Marnitz Boshoff (0/1); Cards: Jaco van der Walt (yellow card) 38' to 48'	Attendance: 2,000; Referee: Quinton Immelman

Bye/s: Pumas

=== Round four ===
The Sharks extended their lead at the top of the Currie Cup log to four points after securing a 26–19 victory over the Blue Bulls, with fullback Curwin Bosch getting a "full house" – scoring points through all four methods (try, conversion, penalty and drop goal) – for a personal points tally of 21 points. The Free State Cheetahs remained in second position on the log despite having a bye, while the Golden Lions moved ahead of the Blue Bulls following a 60–12 victory over the Boland Cavaliers in Johannesburg, with Selom Gavor scoring two of the Lions' nine tries and fly-half Marnitz Boshoff kicking 15 points. Griquas maintained their play-off push with a 41–35 victory over the Pumas in Nelspruit, with both teams scoring four tries. Griquas centre Clinton Swart matched Bosch's 21 points in the match, eclipsing Pumas fly-half Francois Brummer's 15 points, while Rudi van Rooyen scored two tries for the visitors. In the other match of the round, Western Province moved up to sixth place after beating bottom side Eastern Province Kings 36–6, with Huw Jones getting a hat-trick of tries for the team from Cape Town.

26 August 2016	Golden Lions	60–12	Boland Cavaliers	Ellis Park Stadium, Johannesburg
17:00	Try: Selom Gavor 5', 54'; Anthony Volmink 13'; Dillon Smit 30'; Jacques Nel 40'; Victor Sekekete 45'; Howard Mnisi 64'; JW Bell 76'; Dylan Smith 80'; Con: Marnitz Boshoff 6', 31', 46', 55', 65', 81' (6/9); Pen: Marnitz Boshoff 24' (1/1); Cards: Bobby de Wee (yellow card) 71'	Report; Scoreboard	Try: Joubert Horn 27'; Wayne Wilschut 36'; Con: Theuns Kotzé 27' (1/2); Cards: Clemen Lewis (yellow card) 72'	Attendance: 1,000; Referee: Rasta Rasivhenge

26 August 2016	Pumas	35–41	Griquas	Mbombela Stadium, Mbombela
19:10	Try: JP Lewis 10'; Jannie Stander 24'; Marnus Schoeman 51'; Frank Herne 56'; Con: Francois Brummer 25', 51', 57' (3/4); Pen: Francois Brummer 4', 19', 77' (3/3); Cards: Frank Herne (yellow card) 28' to 39'	Report; Scoreboard	Try: Rudi van Rooyen 12', 40'; Alshaun Bock 42'; Wendal Wehr 73'; Con: Clinton Swart 13', 40', 43' (3/4); Pen: Clinton Swart 7', 28', 37', 68', 72' (5/5); Drop: Clinton Swart (0/1)	Referee: Stuart Berry

27 August 2016	Eastern Province Kings	6–36	Western Province	Nelson Mandela Bay Stadium, Port Elizabeth
16:00	Pen: Kobus Marais 3', 32' (2/2); Cards: Christiaan de Bruin (yellow card) 23' to 33'; Etienne Oosthuizen (yellow card) 39'	Report; Scoreboard	Try: Leolin Zas 11'; Huw Jones 18', 72', 75'; Sikhumbuzo Notshe 40'; Jano Vermaak 58'; Con: Brandon Thomson 12', 59', 76' (3/6)	Referee: Pro Legoete

27 August 2016	Sharks	26–19	Blue Bulls	Kings Park Stadium, Durban
18:10	Try: Ruan Botha 38'; Curwin Bosch 55'; Con: Curwin Bosch 39', 56' (2/2); Pen: Curwin Bosch 21', 29', 77' (3/5); Drop: Curwin Bosch 40' (1/1)	Report; Scoreboard	Try: Jamba Ulengo 9'; Con: Tian Schoeman 10' (1/1); Pen: Tian Schoeman 25', 50', 63', 67' (4/4); Cards: Ruan Steenkamp (yellow card) 33' to 43'	Referee: Marius van der Westhuizen

Bye/s: Free State Cheetahs

=== Round One (rescheduled) ===
A midweek match saw Griquas secure their third consecutive victory in the competition to move into third position on the log, while cementing the Eastern Province Kings' last place. Griquas also picked up a bonus point by virtue of scoring seven tries, with fullback AJ Coertzen getting two.

31 August 2016	Griquas	47–24	Eastern Province Kings	Griqua Park, Kimberley
17:00	Try: Wandile Putuma 17'; Jono Janse van Rensburg 29'; Ederies Arendse 46'; Alshaun Bock 49'; AJ Coertzen 52', 68'; Eric Zana 74'; Con: Clinton Swart 18', 30', 47', 50', 53' (5/5); André Swarts 75' (1/2)	Report; Scoreboard	Try: Alcino Izaacs 21', 38'; Cullen Collopy 79'; Con: Lungelo Gosa 22', 39' (2/2); Pieter-Steyn de Wet 80' (1/1); Pen: Lungelo Gosa 36' (1/1); Cards: Siviwe Soyizwapi (yellow card) 73'	Attendance: 1,200; Referee: AJ Jacobs

=== Round Five ===
Despite suffering their first defeat of the season to Western Province, a bonus point in a 27–34 defeat saw the Sharks maintain top spot in the competition. Curwin Bosch was again the Sharks' main points contributor with 18 points through five penalties and converting one of the Sharks' two tries, but Western Province secured the victory after scoring five tries, with outside centre EW Viljoen scoring two in his first start of the season. The Free State Cheetahs made it four wins out of four with a 57–25 win over an Eastern Province Kings team that played their third match in a week, to move to within a single log point of the Sharks, with Nico Lee, Charles Marais and Paul Schoeman each scoring two of the Cheetahs' nine tries. The Blue Bulls moved into the top four with a 31–17 victory over Gauteng rivals the Golden Lions, with the help of 16 points from the boot of Tian Schoeman, pushing Griquas into fourth position and the Lions out of the play-off spots into fifth. In the other match of the round, the Boland Cavaliers secured a narrow 25–22 win over the Pumas in Wellington to secure their second victory of the season, with the Pumas remaining winless.

2 September 2016	Boland Cavaliers	25–22	Pumas	Boland Stadium, Wellington
15:00	Try: Adriaan Carelse 20'; Shaun Adendorff 63'; Robbie Louw 72'; Con: Theuns Kotzé 21', 73' (2/3); Pen: Theuns Kotzé 12' (1/1); Drop: Theuns Kotzé 40' (1/1); Cards: Shaun Adendorff (yellow card) 17' to 27'; Clemen Lewis (yellow card) 90'	Report; Scoreboard	Try: Frank Herne 8'; Renaldo Bothma 48'; Leighton van Wyk 55'; Kevin Luiters 78'; Con: Francois Brummer 56' (1/3); Devon Williams (0/1); Cards: Tyler Fisher (red card) 27'	Attendance: 1,000; Referee: Marius van der Westhuizen

2 September 2016	Blue Bulls	31–17	Golden Lions	Loftus Versfeld, Pretoria
19:00	Try: Travis Ismaiel 31'; Marvin Orie 45'; Joshua Stander 73'; Con: Tian Schoeman 32', 74' (2/3); Pen: Tian Schoeman 2', 15', 24', 64' (4/4)	Report; Scoreboard	Try: Howard Mnisi 25'; Kwagga Smith 60'; Con: Marnitz Boshoff 26', 61' (2/2); Pen: Marnitz Boshoff 19' (1/2)	Attendance: 7,896; Referee: Craig Joubert

3 September 2016	Free State Cheetahs	57–25	Eastern Province Kings	Free State Stadium, Bloemfontein
15:00	Try: Nico Lee 20', 71'; Tom Botha 26'; Paul Schoeman 32', 53'; Charles Marais 59', 78'; Niel Marais 68'; Ox Nché 75'; Con: Fred Zeilinga 27' (1/4); Niel Marais 72', 75' (2/5); Pen: Fred Zeilinga 14', 18' (2/3)	Report; Scoreboard	Try: JC Greyling 11'; Berton Klaasen 76'; Vince Jobo 82'; Con: Pieter-Steyn de Wet 12' (1/1); Kobus Marais 83' (1/2); Pen: Pieter-Steyn de Wet 31' (1/1); Drop: Pieter-Steyn de Wet 58' (1/1)	Attendance: 3,710; Referee: Jaco van Heerden

3 September 2016	Western Province	34–27	Sharks	Newlands Stadium, Cape Town
17:10	Try: Johnny Kôtze 3'; Werner Kok 10'; EW Viljoen 44', 67'; Kobus van Dyk 57'; Con: Robert du Preez 4', 11', 67' (3/5); Pen: Robert du Preez 17' (1/2)	Report; Scoreboard	Try: Jean-Luc du Preez 26'; Rhyno Smith 69'; Con: Curwin Bosch 70' (1/2); Pen: Curwin Bosch 6', 14', 23', 36', 38' (5/5); Drop: Curwin Bosch (0/1); Cards: Jean-Luc du Preez (yellow card) 46' to 56'	Attendance: 14,751; Referee: Rasta Rasivhenge

Bye/s: Griquas

=== Round Six ===
The Free State Cheetahs moved into top spot on the log after beating the Sharks 38–30 in a top-of-the-log clash in Durban. They scored five tries, with Fred Zeilinga successfully converting them all, while 20 points from the boot of Curwin Bosch was not enough for the Sharks, who dropped to second place. The Blue Bulls secured their fourth win of the season to remain in third place, scoring six tries in a 41–14 win over the Pumas in Nelspruit, with winger Jamba Ulengo scoring a brace. Griquas remained in the final semi-final spot after securing a fourth consecutive victory, with 21 points from Clinton Swart and a brace of tries by Elgar Watts helping the team to a 46–22 victory over the Boland Cavaliers. The Golden Lions remained two points behind Griquas after beating Western Province 58–32 in the most high-scoring match of the round. They scored eight tries (with Kwagga Smith scoring two) and Jaco van der Walt kicked 18 points, while Jacques Vermeulen scored two tries for Western Province.

8 September 2016	Griquas	46–22	Boland Cavaliers	Griqua Park, Kimberley
19:00	Try: AJ Coertzen 12'; Ederies Arendse 24'; Elgar Watts 30', 59'; Clinton Swart 46'; Wendal Wehr 62'; Con: Clinton Swart 25', 31', 47', 60', 63' (5/6); Pen: Clinton Swart 4', 16' (2/3)	Report; Scoreboard	Try: Clemen Lewis 51'; Craig Pheiffer 69'; Adriaan Carelse 73'; Con: Theuns Kotzé 52' (1/1); Adriaan Carelse 74' (1/2); Pen: Theuns Kotzé 22' (1/2); Cards: Shaun Adendorff (yellow card) 29' to 39'	Attendance: 2,000; Referee: Jaco van Heerden

9 September 2016	Golden Lions	58–32	Western Province	Ellis Park Stadium, Johannesburg
19:00	Try: Jacques Nel 1'; Robbie Coetzee 15'; Andries Coetzee 18'; JP du Preez 37'; Rohan Janse van Rensburg 40'; Anthony Volmink 46'; Kwagga Smith 57', 74'; Con: Jaco van der Walt 19', 38', 40', 47', 58', 75' (6/8); Pen: Jaco van der Walt 13', 22' (2/2)	Report; Scoreboard	Try: Leolin Zas 33'; Jacques Vermeulen 63', 80'; Dewaldt Duvenage 71'; Con: Robert du Preez 34', 63', 72' (3/4); Pen: Robert du Preez 6', 11' (2/2)	Attendance: 4,000; Referee: Jaco Peyper

10 September 2016	Sharks	30–38	Free State Cheetahs	Kings Park Stadium, Durban
17:00	Try: Francois Kleinhans 59'; Thomas du Toit 69'; Con: Curwin Bosch 60' (1/2); Pen: Curwin Bosch 4', 13', 20', 40', 43', 52' (6/7); Cards: Jean-Luc du Preez (yellow card) 52' to 64'	Report; Scoreboard	Try: penalty try 11'; Michael van der Spuy 28'; Tian Meyer 47'; Uzair Cassiem 52'; Shaun Venter 62'; Con: Fred Zeilinga 12', 29', 48', 53', 63' (5/5); Pen: Fred Zeilinga 37' (1/3)	Attendance: 10,565; Referee: Rasta Rasivhenge

10 September 2016	Pumas	14–41	Blue Bulls	Mbombela Stadium, Mbombela
19:10	Try: Ruwellyn Isbell 70'; Con: Francois Brummer (0/1); Pen: Francois Brummer 11', 25', 33' (3/4); Cards: Leighton van Wyk (yellow card) 59' to 69'	Report; Scoreboard	Try: Ulrich Beyers 7'; Travis Ismaiel 35'; Nick de Jager 39'; Hanro Liebenberg 44'; Jamba Ulengo 50', 66'; Con: Tian Schoeman 8', 36', 40' (3/5); Joshua Stander 67' (1/1); Pen: Tian Schoeman 21' (1/2)	Attendance: 4,736; Referee: Stuart Berry

Bye/s: Eastern Province Kings

=== Round Seven ===
The Free State Cheetahs became the first team to secure a semi-final berth after winning their sixth consecutive match, beating the Golden Lions 37–29 in Bloemfontein. The Cheetahs had different try scorers for all five of their tries, while the Golden Lions relied on the boot of Jaco van der Walt, who kicked 16 of his side's points. After two consecutive defeats, the Sharks returned to winning ways, securing the first whitewash of the season after beating bottom side Eastern Province Kings 53–0, scoring nine tries in the match. The Blue Bulls remained level on log points with the Sharks after scoring a half-century of their own, beating Griquas 57–20 in Pretoria. Piet van Zyl scored two if his side's eight tries, while Tian Schoeman kicked 17 points. While Griquas remained in the final semi-final position despite the defeat, fifth-placed Western Province closed the gap by beating the Pumas 31–23 in Cape Town.

15 September 2016	Free State Cheetahs	37–29	Golden Lions	Free State Stadium, Bloemfontein
19:00	Try: Raymond Rhule 26'; Reniel Hugo 37'; Shaun Venter 52'; Rayno Benjamin 54'; Tian Meyer 79'; Con: Niel Marais 38', 55', 80' (3/5); Pen: Niel Marais 16', 60' (2/3); Cards: Clayton Blommetjies (yellow card) 18' to 29'	Report; Scoreboard	Try: Rohan Janse van Rensburg 32'; Robbie Coetzee 35'; Con: Jaco van der Walt 33', 36' (2/2); Pen: Jaco van der Walt 3', 7', 12', 66' (4/4); Andries Coetzee 23' (1/1); Cards: Jaco van der Walt (yellow card) 15' to 27'; Fabian Booysen (yellow card) 49' to 59'	Attendance: 6,312; Referee: Jaco van Heerden

16 September 2016	Blue Bulls	57–20	Griquas	Loftus Versfeld, Pretoria
19:00	Try: Nick de Jager 16'; Jamba Ulengo 20'; RG Snyman 26'; Piet van Zyl 41', 59'; Ulrich Beyers 54' penalty try 73'; Bjorn Basson 81'; Con: Tian Schoeman 17', 21', 27', 55', 60', 74', 82' (7/8); Pen: Tian Schoeman 39' (1/2); Cards: RG Snyman (yellow card) 46' to 58'	Report; Scoreboard	Try: Alshaun Bock 6'; Wandile Putuma 66'; Con: Clinton Swart 7', 67' (2/2); Pen: Clinton Swart 11', 32' (2/3); Cards: Mzwanele Zito (yellow card) 38' to 48'	Referee: Quinton Immelman

17 September 2016	Sharks	53–0	Eastern Province Kings	Kings Park Stadium, Durban
15:00	Try: André Esterhuizen 4'; Chiliboy Ralepelle 13'; Jean-Luc du Preez 18'; Inny Radebe 31'; Michael Claassens 44'; Francois Kleinhans 48'; Etienne Oosthuizen 54'; Wandile Mjekevu 60'; Khaya Majola 80'; Con: Curwin Bosch 14', 32' (2/5); Patrick Lambie 50', 81' (2/4)	Report; Scoreboard		Attendance: 5,186; Referee: Cwengile Jadezweni

17 September 2016	Western Province	31–23	Pumas	Newlands Stadium, Cape Town
17:10	Try: Werner Kok 21'; Huw Jones 56'; Leolin Zas 68'; Jan de Klerk 71'; Con: Robert du Preez 22', 57', 69', 72' (4/4); Pen: Robert du Preez 18' (1/1); Cards: Stefan Willemse (yellow card) 51' to 61'	Report; Scoreboard	Try: JP Lewis 58'; Tyler Fisher 74'; Renaldo Bothma 80'; Con: Francois Brummer (0/1); Devon Williams 75' (1/2); Pen: Francois Brummer 34' (1/3); Drop: Francois Brummer 4' (1/1); Cards: De-Jay Terblanche (yellow card) 48' to 58'	Referee: Alexandre Ruiz

Bye/s: Boland Cavaliers

=== Round Eight ===
The Free State Cheetahs made it sevens wins in a row after a 52–10 victory over the Pumas in Nelspruit. Rayno Benjamin scored a hat-trick of tries in the match with Paul Schoeman getting a brace, as the Cheetahs ensured that they would top the log and have home advantage in the semifinal and possible final. A 48–26 victory by the Blue Bulls over the Boland Cavaliers in Wellington meant that they would join the Cheetahs in the play-offs. Hanro Liebenberg scored two of the Blue Bulls' seven tries in their final match of the regular season, while Theuns Kotzé also scored two tries for the home side. The biggest margin of victory came in the match between the Eastern Province Kings and the Golden Lions in Port Elizabeth, with the visitors winning 71–7. Golden Lions captain Kwagga Smith scored a hat-trick, with Howard Mnisi and Jacques Nel each contributing two of the Lions' eleven tries. Western Province also won their match against Griquas in Kimberley, meaning all four fixtures resulted in away wins. Six different try scorers and 22 points kicked by Robert du Preez saw Western Province move into the top four, behind a Sharks team that enjoyed a bye weekend, while Griquas dropped to sixth place despite picking up a bonus point for scoring four tries of their own.

23 September 2016	Boland Cavaliers	26–48	Blue Bulls	Boland Stadium, Wellington
15:00	Try: Theuns Kotzé 26', 55'; Danwel Demas 32'; Zandré Jordaan 54'; Con: Theuns Kotzé 27', 55', 55' (3/3); Cards: Francois Hanekom (yellow card) 71'	Report; Scoreboard	Try: Ulrich Beyers 8'; Bjorn Basson 20'; Tian Schoeman 50'; Roelof Smit 63'; Hanro Liebenberg 65', 72'; Lizo Gqoboka 77'; Con: Tian Schoeman 9', 51', 64', 73', 78' (5/7); Pen: Tian Schoeman 46' (1/1)	Attendance: 4,280; Referee: Shuhei Kubo

23 September 2016	Pumas	10–52	Free State Cheetahs	Mbombela Stadium, Mbombela
18:40	Try: Frank Herne 71'; Con: Heinrich Steyl 72' (1/1); Pen: Francois Brummer 21' (1/1)	Report; Scoreboard	Try: Rayno Benjamin 7', 48', 58'; Uzair Cassiem 24'; Paul Schoeman 26', 37'; Francois Venter 32'; Elandré Huggett 77'; Con: Niel Marais 8', 25', 38', 49', 59' (5/7); Fred Zeilinga 78' (1/1)	Attendance: 2,083; Referee: Pro Legoete

23 September 2016	Griquas	31–52	Western Province	Griqua Park, Kimberley
19:00	Try: JW Jonker 10'; Rudi van Rooyen 27'; André Swarts 36'; Jonathan Adendorf 76'; Con: Clinton Swart 11', 28' (2/2); André Swarts 37', 76' (2/2); Pen: Clinton Swart (0/2); André Swarts 49' (1/2); Drop: AJ Coertzen (0/1)	Report; Scoreboard	Try: Juan de Jongh 25'; Bongi Mbonambi 33'; Huw Jones 51'; Werner Kok 53'; Nizaam Carr 70'; Leolin Zas 80'; Con: Robert du Preez 26', 34', 54', 71', 81' (5/6); Pen: Robert du Preez 40', 46', 66', 79' (4/4)	Attendance: 7,000; Referee: Jaco Peyper

24 September 2016	Eastern Province Kings	7–71	Golden Lions	Nelson Mandela Bay Stadium, Port Elizabeth
17:10	Try: Sampie Mastriet 22'; Con: Pieter-Steyn de Wet 23' (1/1)	Report; Scoreboard	Try: Ruan Ackermann 18'; Howard Mnisi 30', 69'; Koch Marx 38'; Kwagga Smith 40', 63', 66'; Anthony Volmink 42'; Jacques Nel 45', 80'; Sylvian Mahuza 76'; Con: Jaco van der Walt 19', 39', 40', 43', 64' (5/7); Andries Coetzee 70', 77', 81' (3/4)	Referee: Cwengile Jadezweni

Bye/s: Sharks

=== Round Nine ===
In the first match of the weekend, defending champions the Golden Lions secured a place in the semifinals after beating the Sharks 28–16 in Johannesburg. The result meant that the Sharks needed the Boland Cavaliers to get an unlikely victory against Western Province a few hours later. Boland ran in four tries to lead 28–20 with 8 minutes to go, but Western Province scored a converted try and a 78th–minute penalty through fly-half Robert du Preez to secure the final semi-final spot in dramatic fashion, winning the match 30–28. The final match on the Friday night saw the Pumas travel to the Eastern Province Kings for a match between the bottom two teams on the log, both without a win to their name prior to this match. The Pumas edged the match 38–30, with hooker Frank Herne scoring a hat-trick of tries in his team's only win of the season. The final group match in the competition was a dead rubber; top side Free State Cheetahs outscored Griquas by 9 tries to 4 to win 63–26; scrum-half Shaun Venter got a brace, while fly-half Niel Marais contributed 17 points through one try and 6 conversions.

30 September 2016	Golden Lions	28–16	Sharks	Ellis Park Stadium, Johannesburg
17:05	Try: Kwagga Smith 46'; Howard Mnisi 58'; Sylvian Mahuza 70'; Con: Jaco van der Walt 47' (1/2); Andries Coetzee 71' (1/1); Pen: Jaco van der Walt 51' (1/3); Andries Coetzee 63', 77' (2/2)	Report; Scoreboard	Try: Michael Claassens 21'; Con: Curwin Bosch 22' (1/1); Pen: Curwin Bosch 11', 44', 53' (3/5); Cards: Francois Kleinhans (yellow card) 50' to 60'; André Esterhuizen (yellow card) 76'	Attendance: 13,201; Referee: Craig Joubert

30 September 2016	Eastern Province Kings	30–38	Pumas	Nelson Mandela Bay Stadium, Port Elizabeth
18:00	Try: Johann Tromp 17'; Brandon Brown 28'; Ricky Schroeder 46'; Con: Pieter-Steyn de Wet 18', 29', 47' (3/3); Pen: Pieter-Steyn de Wet 2', 8', 63' (3/3); Cards: Brandon Brown (yellow card) 38' to 48'; Etienne Oosthuizen (yellow card) 70'	Report; Scoreboard	Try: Brian Shabangu 11'; Frank Herne 23', 38', 71'; Kevin Luiters 58'; JP Lewis 78'; Con: Heinrich Steyl 24', 39' (2/3); Devon Williams 72', 79' (2/3); Cards: Carel Greeff (yellow card) 44' to 54'	Attendance: 791; Referee: Quinton Immelman

30 September 2016	Western Province	30–28	Boland Cavaliers	Newlands Stadium, Cape Town
19:10	Try: Scott van Breda 23'; Kobus van Dyk 36'; David Ribbans 73'; Con: Robert du Preez 24', 37', 73' (3/3); Pen: Robert du Preez 20', 55', 78' (3/3)	Report; Scoreboard	Try: Shaun Adendorff 2'; Adriaan Carelse 50'; Francois Hanekom 63'; Jacques Engelbrecht 65'; Con: Theuns Kotzé 3', 51', 64', 66' (4/4)	Attendance: 6,131; Referee: AJ Jacobs

1 October 2016	Free State Cheetahs	63–26	Griquas	Free State Stadium, Bloemfontein
14:00	Try: penalty try 14'; Uzair Cassiem 15'; Shaun Venter 17', 58'; Henco Venter 31'; Niel Marais 34'; Nico Lee 39'; Torsten van Jaarsveld 78'; Raymond Rhule 80'; Con: Niel Marais 14', 16', 18', 32', 35', 40' (6/6); Fred Zeilinga 59', 79', 81' (3/3)	Report; Scoreboard	Try: Johnathan Francke 1'; Renier Botha 25'; André Swarts 45'; Jason Fraser 76'; Con: André Swarts 25', 46' (2/3); Eric Zana 77' (1/1)	Attendance: 4,384; Referee: Cwengile Jadezweni

Bye/s: Blue Bulls

=== Semi-finals ===
The Free State Cheetahs maintained their unbeaten record in the season with an emphatic 55–17 victory over the Golden Lions. They scored six tries, with right winger Sergeal Petersen getting a hat-trick, while fly-half Niel Marais added 21 points, successfully kicking three conversions and five penalties in the match. Blue Bulls fly-half Tian Schoeman replicated Marais' kicking record in his side's 36–30 victory over Western Province in the second semi-final, which ended in dramatic fashion as the Blue Bulls scored a try in the 78th minute through replacement scrum-half Ivan van Zyl – in his first appearance of the season – to overturn Western Province's lead. These results meant that the Free State Cheetahs qualified for their first final since 2009, when they also met the Blue Bulls in the final, and their first home final since 2006, when the same two teams drew 28–all after extra time to share the title.

15 October 2016	Free State Cheetahs	55–17	Golden Lions	Free State Stadium, Bloemfontein
15:00	Try: Sergeal Petersen 15', 34', 76'; Niell Jordaan 41'; Rayno Benjamin 69'; Clayton Blommetjies 72'; Con: Niel Marais 16', 35', 42' (3/3); Fred Zeilinga 70', 73' (2/3); Pen: Niel Marais 6', 9', 24', 27', 54' (5/5); Cards: Rayno Benjamin (yellow card) 48' to 58'; Paul Schoeman (yellow card) 61' to 71'	Report; Scoreboard	Try: Sylvian Mahuza 49', 67'; Ruaan Lerm 80'; Con: Jaco van der Walt (0/1); Andries Coetzee 80' (1/2); Cards: Cyle Brink (yellow card) 26' to 38'	Attendance: 23,192; Referee: Rasta Rasivhenge

15 October 2016	Blue Bulls	36–30	Western Province	Loftus Versfeld, Pretoria
18:00	Try: Travis Ismaiel 10'; Jason Jenkins 63'; Ivan van Zyl 78'; Con: Tian Schoeman 11', 64', 79' (3/3); Pen: Tian Schoeman 24', 33', 37', 47', 55' (5/5); Drop: Tian Schoeman (0/1)	Report; Scoreboard	Try: Nizaam Carr 19'; Werner Kok 49'; Jan de Klerk 58'; Con: Robert du Preez 20', 50', 59' (3/3); Pen: Robert du Preez 40', 41', 73' (3/3)	Attendance: 17,968; Referee: Marius van der Westhuizen

=== Final ===
The Free State Cheetahs beat the Blue Bulls 36–16 to win the Currie Cup for the fifth time in their history and for the first time since 2007. The first half delivered no tries, with Free State Cheetahs fly-half Niel Marais kicking six penalties against Blue Bulls fly-half Tian Schoeman's three penalties for an 18–9 half-time lead. A converted Clayton Blommetjies try and two more penalties extended the Free State Cheetahs' lead to 31–9 by the 67th minute. A Piet van Zyl try in the 74th minute briefly gave the Blue Bulls some hope, but the Free State Cheetahs responded with a try of their own through Sergeal Petersen just two minutes later to put the result beyond any doubt. Niel Marais contributed 21 points for the home side by kicking seven penalties; a new Currie Cup final record, surpassing the six penalties scored by Thierry Lacroix in the 1995 final and by Patrick Lambie in the 2012 final.

22 October 2016	Free State Cheetahs	36–16	Blue Bulls	Free State Stadium, Bloemfontein
16:00	Try: Clayton Blommetjies 63'; Sergeal Petersen 76'; Con: Fred Zeilinga 64' (1/2); Pen: Niel Marais 4', 9', 12', 18', 26', 40', 53' (7/8); Fred Zeilinga 67' (1/1)	Report; Scoreboard	Try: Piet van Zyl 74'; Con: Joshua Stander 75' (1/1); Pen: Tian Schoeman 6', 13', 35' (3/3); Cards: Jamba Ulengo (yellow card) 8' to 18'	Attendance: 43,400; Referee: Jaco Peyper

== Honours ==
The honour roll for the 2016 Currie Cup Premier Division was:

2016 Currie Cup Premier Division Honours
Champions:	Free State Cheetahs (5th title)
Top Try Scorers:	Frank Herne, Pumas; Huw Jones, Western Province; Howard Mnisi, Golden Lions; Kwagga Smith, Golden Lions and Jamba Ulengo, Blue Bulls (11)
Top Points Scorer:	Tian Schoeman, Blue Bulls (146)

== Players ==
=== Squads ===
The following squads were named for the 2016 Currie Cup Premier Division:

Blue Bulls squad
Forwards	Jacobie Adriaanse • Arno Botha • Nick de Jager • Martin Dreyer • Lizo Gqoboka • Irné Herbst • Jason Jenkins • John-Roy Jenkinson • Jannes Kirsten • Hanro Liebenberg • Bandise Maku • Edgar Marutlulle • Nqoba Mxoli • Marvin Orie • Pierre Schoeman • Roelof Smit • Eli Snyman • RG Snyman • Ruan Steenkamp • Entienne Swanepoel • Jaco Visagie • Did not play: • Andrew Beerwinkel • Clyde Davids • Corniel Els • Aston Fortuin • Neethling Fouché • Njabulo Gumede • Freddy Ngoza • Abongile Nonkontwana • Trevor Nyakane • Adriaan Strauss • Tapiwa Tsomondo • Jan van der Merwe • Ruben van Heerden
Backs	Bjorn Basson • Ulrich Beyers • Travis Ismaiel • Tony Jantjies • Dan Kriel • Duncan Matthews • Burger Odendaal • Rudy Paige • Divan Rossouw • Tian Schoeman • Joshua Stander • Jade Stighling • Dries Swanepoel • Jamba Ulengo • Ivan van Zyl • Piet van Zyl • André Warner • Did not play: • Alcino Izaacs • JT Jackson • Jesse Kriel • Manie Libbok • Kefentse Mahlo • Kobus Marais • Ganfried May • Franco Naudé • Luther Obi • Marquit September • Jan Serfontein
Coach	Nollis Marais

Boland Cavaliers squad
Forwards	Shaun Adendorff • Kenan Cronjé • Jacques Engelbrecht • Francois Esterhuyzen • Francois Hanekom • Joubert Horn • Zandré Jordaan • Hanno Kitshoff • Clemen Lewis • Shaun McDonald • Enoch Mnyaka • Basil Short • Linda Thwala • Ockie van Zyl • Chadley Wenn • SP Wessels • Chaney Willemse • Wayne Wilschut • Did not play: • Yves Bashiya • Gareth Cilliers • JC Genade • Ferdie Horn • Ludio Williams
Backs	Logan Basson • Christopher Bosch • Adriaan Carelse • Jovelian de Koker • Danwel Demas • Marnus Hugo • Gerhard Jordaan • Theuns Kotzé • Robbie Louw • Ryan Nell • Craig Pheiffer • Nico Scheepers • Sergio Torrens • Gerrit van Wyk • William van Wyk • PJ Vermeulen • Did not play: • Edwin Sass
Coach	Brent Janse van Rensburg

Eastern Province Kings squad
Forwards	David Antonites • Martin Bezuidenhout • Brandon Brown • Cullen Collopy • Christiaan de Bruin • Schalk Ferreira • Sebastian Ferreira • Justin Forwood • Tazz Fuzani • Dirk Grobbelaar • Hannes Huisamen • Vince Jobo • Caylib Oosthuizen • Etienne Oosthuizen • Dylan Pieterse • Barend Potgieter • Vukile Sofisa • Pieter Stemmet • Luke van der Smit • Warrick Venter • Mike Willemse • Did not play: • Dolph Botha
Backs	Pieter-Steyn de Wet • Jacques Fick • Lungelo Gosa • JC Greyling • Alcino Izaacs • Berton Klaasen • Kobus Marais • Sampie Mastriet • Ganfried May • Sphu Msutwana • Minenhle Mthethwa • Waylon Murray • Ricky Schroeder • Siviwe Soyizwapi • Johann Tromp • Vian van der Watt
Coach	Barend Pieterse

Free State Cheetahs squad
Forwards	Justin Basson • Tom Botha • Tienie Burger • Uzair Cassiem • Aranos Coetzee • Jacques du Toit • Joseph Dweba • Elandré Huggett • Reniel Hugo • Niell Jordaan • Armandt Koster • Charles Marais • Ox Nché • Paul Schoeman • Boela Serfontein • Torsten van Jaarsveld • Conraad van Vuuren • Henco Venter • Carl Wegner • Did not play: • Luan de Bruin • Danie Mienie • Oupa Mohojé • Gerhard Olivier • Boom Prinsloo • Neil Rautenbach • BG Uys • Dennis Visser
Backs	Rayno Benjamin • Clayton Blommetjies • Maphutha Dolo • Sias Ebersohn • Nico Lee • Niel Marais • Tian Meyer • Zee Mkhabela • Sergeal Petersen • Raymond Rhule • William Small-Smith • Michael van der Spuy • Francois Venter • Shaun Venter • Fred Zeilinga • Did not play: • Reinhardt Erwee • Tertius Kruger • Mosolwa Mafuma • JP Smith • Ruan van Rensburg
Coach	Franco Smith

Golden Lions squad
Forwards	Justin Ackerman • Ruan Ackermann • Fabian Booysen • Cyle Brink • Robbie Coetzee • Bobby de Wee • Stephan de Wit • Ruan Dreyer • JP du Preez • Lourens Erasmus • Andries Ferreira • Corné Fourie • Ruaan Lerm • MB Lusaseni • Malcolm Marx • Martin Muller • Julian Redelinghuys • Ramone Samuels • Pieter Scholtz • Victor Sekekete • Dylan Smith • Kwagga Smith • Akker van der Merwe • Jacques van Rooyen
Backs	JW Bell • Marnitz Boshoff • Andries Coetzee • Ross Cronjé • Ashlon Davids • Faf de Klerk • Selom Gavor • Stokkies Hanekom • Rohan Janse van Rensburg • Sylvian Mahuza • Koch Marx • Howard Mnisi • Jacques Nel • Courtnall Skosan • Dillon Smit • Jaco van der Walt • Anthony Volmink
Coach	Johan Ackermann

Griquas squad
Forwards	Jonathan Adendorf • Marius Fourie • Jason Fraser • Liam Hendricks • Jono Janse van Rensburg • Sias Koen • Stephan Kotzé • AJ le Roux • RJ Liebenberg • Hilton Lobberts • Thabo Mabuza • Devon Martinus • Steven Meiring • Chase Morison • Wandile Putuma • Steph Roberts • Sidney Tobias • Steph Vermeulen • Wendal Wehr • Mzwanele Zito
Backs	Ederies Arendse • Alshaun Bock • Renier Botha • AJ Coertzen • Ntabeni Dukisa • Johnathan Francke • JW Jonker • Steven Moir • Clinton Swart • André Swarts • Rudi van Rooyen • Elgar Watts • Eric Zana • Did not play: • Tiaan Dorfling
Coach	Peter Engledow

Pumas squad
Forwards	Louis Albertse • Renaldo Bothma • Marné Coetzee • François du Toit • Carel Greeff • Stephan Greeff • Lambert Groenewald • Wiehan Hay • Frank Herne • Reuben Johannes • Jeremy Jordaan • Hugo Kloppers • Jacques Kotzé • Khwezi Mona • Dylan Peterson • Marnus Schoeman • Brian Shabangu • Jannie Stander • De-Jay Terblanche • Nardus van der Walt • Simon Westraadt • Did not play: • Rassie Jansen van Vuuren • Sabelo Nhlapo
Backs	Bernado Botha • Francois Brummer • Tyler Fisher • Deon Helberg • Ruwellyn Isbell • JP Lewis • Kevin Luiters • Hoffmann Maritz • Marcello Sampson • Hennie Skorbinski • Heinrich Steyl • Emile Temperman • Marlou van Niekerk • Reynier van Rooyen • Justin van Staden • Leighton van Wyk • Devon Williams • Did not play: • Johan Herbst • Wilmaure Louw
Coach	MJ Mentz

Sharks squad
Forwards	Lourens Adriaanse • JC Astle • Ruan Botha • Dale Chadwick • Keegan Daniel • Jean Deysel • Jean Droste • Jean-Luc du Preez • Thomas du Toit • Francois Kleinhans • Stephan Lewies • Khaya Majola • Franco Marais • John-Hubert Meyer • Tera Mtembu • Etienne Oosthuizen • Chiliboy Ralepelle • Juan Schoeman • Philip van der Walt • Did not play: • Hyron Andrews • Stephan Coetzee • Dan du Preez • Johan du Toit • Tendai Mtawarira • Coenie Oosthuizen
Backs	Lukhanyo Am • Garth April • Curwin Bosch • Michael Claassens • André Esterhuizen • Patrick Lambie • Neil Maritz • Wandile Mjekevu • Lwazi Mvovo • Odwa Ndungane • Inny Radebe • S'bura Sithole • Rhyno Smith • Stefan Ungerer • Hanco Venter • Heimar Williams • Did not play: • Benhard Janse van Rensburg • Morné Joubert • Marius Louw • S'busiso Nkosi • Cobus Reinach
Coach	Robert du Preez

Western Province squad
Forwards	Eital Bredenkamp • Nizaam Carr • Jan de Klerk • Rynhardt Elstadt • Martin Ferreira • JC Janse van Rensburg • Oli Kebble • Wilco Louw • Bongi Mbonambi • Sikhumbuzo Notshe • Scarra Ntubeni • Neil Rautenbach • David Ribbans • JD Schickerling • Sti Sithole • JP Smith • Chad Solomon • Kobus van Dyk • Jurie van Vuuren • Chris van Zyl • Alistair Vermaak • Jacques Vermeulen • Mike Willemse • Stefan Willemse • Did not play: • Beyers de Villiers • Janco Venter
Backs	Damian de Allende • Juan de Jongh • Daniël du Plessis • Robert du Preez • Dewaldt Duvenage • Huw Jones • Werner Kok • Cheslin Kolbe • Johnny Kôtze • Godlen Masimla • Khanyo Ngcukana • Jaco Taute • Brandon Thomson • Scott van Breda • Kobus van Wyk • Jano Vermaak • EW Viljoen • Leolin Zas • Did not play: • Justin Phillips
Coach	John Dobson

=== Appearances and points ===
Blue Bulls
Name	WPr	FSC	EPK	SHA	LIO	PMA	GRQ	BOL	SF	F	App	Try	Kck	Pts
Pierre Schoeman	1	1	17 (substituted on)		1		1		23 (substituted on)	23 (substituted on)	7	0	0	0
Jaco Visagie	2	2	2	2	2	16 (substituted on)	2	16 (substituted on)	2	2	10	0	0	0
Entienne Swanepoel	3	3	3								3	0	0	0
Jason Jenkins	4	4					18 (substituted on)	18 (substituted on)	18 (substituted on)	4	6	2	0	10
Marvin Orie	5	5	5	5	5	5	5	5	5	5	10	2	0	10
Ruan Steenkamp	6	6	6	6	6	6					6	1	0	5
Jannes Kirsten	7	7	7	7			19 (substituted on)	19 (substituted on)	7	7	8	2	0	10
Arno Botha (c)	8	8	8	8	7				8	8	7	0	0	0
Piet van Zyl	9	9	9	9	9	9	9	9		20 (substituted on)	9	4	0	20
Tian Schoeman	10	10	10	10	10	10	10	10	10	10	10	2	136	146
Jamba Ulengo	11	14	14	11	11	11	11	14	11	11	10	7	0	35
Burger Odendaal	12	12	12	12	12	12	12	12	12	12	10	1	0	5
Dries Swanepoel	13			13	13	13	13	13	13	13	8	0	0	0
Jade Stighling	14										1	1	0	5
Bjorn Basson	15	11	11				22 (substituted on)	11	22 (substituted on)	22 (substituted on)	7	4	0	20
Bandise Maku	16 (substituted on)			16 (substituted on)	16	2	16 (substituted on)	2	16 (substituted on)	16 (substituted on)	7	0	0	0
Nqoba Mxoli	17 (substituted on)										1	0	0	0
Eli Snyman	18 (substituted on)										1	0	0	0
Hanro Liebenberg	19 (substituted on)	19 (substituted on)	20 (substituted on)	19 (substituted on)	8	8	8	8	19 (substituted on)	19 (substituted on)	10	3	0	15
André Warner	20 (substituted on)	20 (substituted on)	21 (substituted on)	20 (substituted on)	20 (substituted on)	20 (substituted on)	20 (substituted on)				7	0	0	0
Tony Jantjies	21 (substituted on)										1	0	0	0
Dan Kriel	22 (substituted on)	13	13								3	0	0	0
Ulrich Beyers		15		22 (substituted on)	22 (substituted on)	15	15	15	15	15	8	3	0	15
Edgar Marutlulle		16 (substituted on)	16 (substituted on)								2	0	0	0
Martin Dreyer		17 (substituted on)		17 (substituted on)	17 (substituted on)	17 (substituted on)	3	17 (substituted on)	17 (substituted on)	17 (substituted on)	8	0	0	0
RG Snyman		18 (substituted on)	4	4	4	4	4	4	4		8	1	0	5
Joshua Stander		21 (substituted on)	22 (substituted on)	21 (substituted on)	21 (substituted on)	21 (substituted on)	21 (substituted on)	21 (substituted on)	21	21 (substituted on)	8	2	6	16
Duncan Matthews		22 (substituted on)	15	15	15						4	0	0	0
Lizo Gqoboka			1	1		1		1	1	1	6	1	0	5
Jacobie Adriaanse			18 (substituted on)	3	3	3		3	3	3	7	0	0	0
Irné Herbst			19 (substituted on)			18 (substituted on)					2	0	0	0
Travis Ismaiel				14	14	14	14		14	14	6	3	0	15
Nick de Jager				18 (substituted on)	18 (substituted on)	7	7	7		18 (substituted on)	6	2	0	10
Roelof Smit					19 (substituted on)	19 (substituted on)	6	6	6	6	6	1	0	5
Divan Rossouw						22 (substituted on)		22 (substituted on)			2	0	0	0
John-Roy Jenkinson							17 (substituted on)				1	0	0	0
Rudy Paige								20 (substituted on)	9	9	3	0	0	0
Ivan van Zyl									20 (substituted on)		1	1	0	5
penalty try											–	1	–	5
Total											10	44	142	362
Andrew Beerwinkel, Clyde Davids, Corniel Els, Aston Fortuin, Neethling Fouché, Njabulo Gumede, Alcino Izaacs, JT Jackson, Jesse Kriel, Manie Libbok, Kefentse Mahlo, Kobus Marais, Ganfried May, Franco Naudé, Freddy Ngoza, Abongile Nonkontwana, Trevor Nyakane, Luther Obi, Marquit September, Jan Serfontein, Adriaan Strauss, Tapiwa Tsomondo, Jan van der Merwe and Ruben van Heerden were named in the Currie Cup Premier Division squad, but not included in a matchday squad.

Boland Cavaliers
Name	FSC	EPK	SHA	LIO	PMA	GRQ	BUL	WPr	SF	F	App	Try	Kck	Pts
SP Wessels	1	1	1	18 (substituted on)	17 (substituted on)	1	1		—N/a	—N/a	7	0	0	0
Clemen Lewis	2		16 (substituted on)	16 (substituted on)	2	2	2	2	—N/a	—N/a	7	1	0	5
Basil Short	3	3	3	3		17 (substituted on)	3	1	—N/a	—N/a	7	0	0	0
Shaun McDonald	4	4	4	7	7	7	4	4	—N/a	—N/a	8	0	0	0
Hanno Kitshoff	5	5	5	4	4	4	20 (substituted on)	5	—N/a	—N/a	8	0	0	0
Kenan Cronjé	6	6	20 (substituted on)	20 (substituted on)	20 (substituted on)		6		—N/a	—N/a	6	1	0	5
Jacques Engelbrecht	7	7	7		8	8	7	7	—N/a	—N/a	7	1	0	5
Zandré Jordaan	8	8	8			19 (substituted on)	8	8	—N/a	—N/a	6	2	0	10
Marnus Hugo	9	9	9	21 (substituted on)	9	9	9	9	—N/a	—N/a	8	0	0	0
Adriaan Carelse	10	10	10	15	15	10	15	15	—N/a	—N/a	8	3	2	17
Danwel Demas	11	11	11	11	11	11	11	14	—N/a	—N/a	8	3	0	15
Christopher Bosch	12	12	13	13	13	12	12		—N/a	—N/a	7	1	0	5
Ryan Nell (c)	13	13	12	12	12				—N/a	—N/a	5	1	0	5
Sergio Torrens	14	14	14	14		14		22 (substituted on)	—N/a	—N/a	6	2	0	10
Nico Scheepers	15	15	15						—N/a	—N/a	3	0	22	22
Chadley Wenn	16 (substituted on)	2							—N/a	—N/a	2	0	0	0
Francois Hanekom	17 (substituted on)	17 (substituted on)	18 (substituted on)	1			18 (substituted on)	3	—N/a	—N/a	6	1	0	5
Joubert Horn	18 (substituted on)	18 (substituted on)	19 (substituted on)	5	5	5	5	20 (substituted on)	—N/a	—N/a	8	1	0	5
Chaney Willemse	19 (substituted on)	19 (substituted on)							—N/a	—N/a	2	0	0	0
Jovelian de Koker	20 (substituted on)	20 (substituted on)	21 (substituted on)						—N/a	—N/a	3	0	0	0
William van Wyk	21	21 (substituted on)							—N/a	—N/a	1	0	0	0
Craig Pheiffer	22	22 (substituted on)				21 (substituted on)			—N/a	—N/a	2	1	0	5
Francois Esterhuyzen		16 (substituted on)	2	2	16	16 (substituted on)	16 (substituted on)	16 (substituted on)	—N/a	—N/a	6	0	0	0
Shaun Adendorff			6	6	6	6		6	—N/a	—N/a	5	2	0	10
Enoch Mnyaka			17 (substituted on)	17 (substituted on)	3	3	17 (substituted on)	17 (substituted on)	—N/a	—N/a	6	0	0	0
Theuns Kotzé			22 (substituted on)	10	10	15	10	10	—N/a	—N/a	6	2	33	43
Wayne Wilschut				8	19 (substituted on)	18 (substituted on)	19 (substituted on)	19	—N/a	—N/a	4	1	0	5
Gerhard Jordaan				9	21 (substituted on)	20 (substituted on)	21 (substituted on)	21	—N/a	—N/a	4	0	0	0
Ockie van Zyl				19 (substituted on)	18				—N/a	—N/a	1	0	0	0
Gerrit van Wyk				22 (substituted on)	14		13	13	—N/a	—N/a	4	0	0	0
Linda Thwala					1			18 (substituted on)	—N/a	—N/a	2	0	0	0
Robbie Louw					22 (substituted on)	13	22 (substituted on)		—N/a	—N/a	3	1	0	5
Logan Basson						22 (substituted on)	14	11	—N/a	—N/a	3	0	0	0
PJ Vermeulen				—N/a	—N/a			12	—N/a	—N/a	1	0	0	0
Total											8	24	57	177
Yves Bashiya, Gareth Cilliers, JC Genade, Ferdie Horn, Edwin Sass and Ludio Williams were named in the Currie Cup Premier Division squad, but not included in a matchday squad.

Eastern Province Kings
Name	BOL	BUL	WPr	GRQ	FSC	SHA	LIO	PMA	SF	F	App	Try	Kck	Pts
Schalk Ferreira (c)	1								—N/a	—N/a	1	0	0	0
Mike Willemse	2	2	2		2				—N/a	—N/a	4	1	0	5
Vukile Sofisa	3	3	3		3	17 (substituted on)	17 (substituted on)	3	—N/a	—N/a	7	0	0	0
Tazz Fuzani	4	4	4					4	—N/a	—N/a	4	0	0	0
David Antonites	5	5					4		—N/a	—N/a	3	0	0	0
Vince Jobo	6	6	6		6	6	19 (substituted on)		—N/a	—N/a	6	1	0	5
Sebastian Ferreira	7	7	5		5	5	5	7	—N/a	—N/a	7	0	0	0
Christiaan de Bruin	8	8	8		8	8	8	8	—N/a	—N/a	7	0	0	0
Ricky Schroeder	9	9	9		9	9	9	9	—N/a	—N/a	7	1	0	5
Kobus Marais	10	10	10		21 (substituted on)				—N/a	—N/a	4	0	21	21
Sampie Mastriet	11	11	11		11	11	11	11	—N/a	—N/a	7	1	0	5
Waylon Murray	12	12				12	12	12	—N/a	—N/a	5	0	0	0
Johann Tromp	13	15	15		15		15	15	—N/a	—N/a	6	3	0	15
Alcino Izaacs	14			11		22 (substituted on)	14		—N/a	—N/a	4	2	0	10
Siviwe Soyizwapi	15	14	14	22 (substituted on)	14	14		14	—N/a	—N/a	7	1	0	5
Martin Bezuidenhout	16 (substituted on)	16 (substituted on)	16 (substituted on)	2	16 (substituted on)	2	2	2	—N/a	—N/a	8	1	0	5
Justin Forwood	17 (substituted on)	1	1		1	3	1		—N/a	—N/a	6	0	0	0
Dirk Grobbelaar	18 (substituted on)			8					—N/a	—N/a	2	0	0	0
Brandon Brown	19 (substituted on)		20 (substituted on)	7	19 (substituted on)	7	7	6	—N/a	—N/a	7	1	0	5
Jacques Fick	20 (substituted on)	20		9					—N/a	—N/a	2	0	0	0
Berton Klaasen	21 (substituted on)	13	12		12	13	13	13	—N/a	—N/a	7	2	0	10
Lungelo Gosa	22 (substituted on)	22 (substituted on)	21 (substituted on)	10		15	21 (substituted on)	22 (substituted on)	—N/a	—N/a	7	0	9	9
Barend Potgieter		17 (substituted on)	17 (substituted on)	1	17 (substituted on)	1		1	—N/a	—N/a	6	0	0	0
Etienne Oosthuizen		18 (substituted on)	7	18 (substituted on)	7	18 (substituted on)	18 (substituted on)	18 (substituted on)	—N/a	—N/a	7	0	0	0
Luke van der Smit		19 (substituted on)	19 (substituted on)	6		19 (substituted on)	6	19 (substituted on)	—N/a	—N/a	6	0	0	0
Minenhle Mthethwa		21 (substituted on)		14		21 (substituted on)			—N/a	—N/a	3	0	0	0
JC Greyling			13	12	13		22 (substituted on)		—N/a	—N/a	4	1	0	5
Dylan Pieterse			18 (substituted on)	5	4	4		5	—N/a	—N/a	5	0	0	0
Ganfried May			22 (substituted on)	15	22 (substituted on)				—N/a	—N/a	3	0	0	0
Pieter Stemmet				3			3	17 (substituted on)	—N/a	—N/a	3	0	0	0
Hannes Huisamen				4	18 (substituted on)				—N/a	—N/a	2	0	0	0
Sphu Msutwana				13					—N/a	—N/a	1	0	0	0
Warrick Venter				16 (substituted on)		16 (substituted on)		16	—N/a	—N/a	2	0	0	0
Caylib Oosthuizen				17 (substituted on)					—N/a	—N/a	1	0	0	0
Cullen Collopy				19 (substituted on)			16 (substituted on)	20	—N/a	—N/a	2	1	0	5
Vian van der Watt				20 (substituted on)	20 (substituted on)	20 (substituted on)	20 (substituted on)	21 (substituted on)	—N/a	—N/a	5	0	0	0
Pieter-Steyn de Wet				21 (substituted on)	10	10	10	10	—N/a	—N/a	5	0	27	27
Total											8	16	57	137
Dolph Botha was named in the Currie Cup Premier Division squad, but not included in a matchday squad.

Free State Cheetahs
Name	BOL	BUL	WPr	EPK	SHA	LIO	PMA	GRQ	SF	F	App	Try	Kck	Pts
Ox Nché	1	1	17 (substituted on)	1	1	1	17 (substituted on)	1	1	17 (substituted on)	10	2	0	10
Joseph Dweba	2										1	0	0	0
Tom Botha	3	3	18 (substituted on)	3	3	3					6	1	0	5
Carl Wegner	4	4	4	4							4	0	0	0
Reniel Hugo	5	5	5	5	5	5	5	5	5	5	10	1	0	5
Paul Schoeman	6	6	6	6	6	6	6		6	6	9	4	0	20
Uzair Cassiem	7	7	7	7	7	7	7	7	7	7	10	4	0	20
Niell Jordaan	8	8	8	8	20 (substituted on)	8	8	8	8	8	10	1	0	5
Shaun Venter	9	20 (substituted on)	21 (substituted on)	20 (substituted on)	21 (substituted on)	9	9	9	9	9	10	5	0	25
Fred Zeilinga	10	10	10	10	10	21	21 (substituted on)	21 (substituted on)	21 (substituted on)	21 (substituted on)	9	0	90	90
Raymond Rhule	11	11	11	11	11	11		11	11	11	9	3	0	15
William Small-Smith	12	12	12	12		12	22 (substituted on)	22 (substituted on)			7	2	0	10
Francois Venter (c)	13	13					13	13	13	13	6	3	0	15
Sergeal Petersen	14						14		14	14	4	5	0	25
Clayton Blommetjies	15	15	15	15	15	15	15	15	15	15	10	3	0	15
Jacques du Toit	16 (substituted on)	16 (substituted on)	2	16 (substituted on)	16 (substituted on)	16 (substituted on)	2	2	16 (substituted on)	16 (substituted on)	10	0	0	0
Charles Marais	17 (substituted on)	17 (substituted on)	1	17 (substituted on)	17 (substituted on)	17 (substituted on)	1	17 (substituted on)	17 (substituted on)	1	10	2	0	10
Justin Basson	18 (substituted on)	18 (substituted on)	19	18 (substituted on)	4	4	4	4	4	4	9	0	0	0
Henco Venter	19 (substituted on)	19 (substituted on)	20 (substituted on)	19 (substituted on)	8			6	19 (substituted on)	19 (substituted on)	8	1	0	5
Tian Meyer	20 (substituted on)	9	9	9	9	20 (substituted on)			20 (substituted on)	20 (substituted on)	8	3	0	15
Sias Ebersohn	21 (substituted on)										1	0	0	0
Rayno Benjamin	22 (substituted on)	14	14	14	14	14	11	14	22 (substituted on)	22 (substituted on)	10	6	0	30
Torsten van Jaarsveld		2	16 (substituted on)	2	2	2		16 (substituted on)	2	2	8	1	0	5
Niel Marais		21 (substituted on)	22	21 (substituted on)	22 (substituted on)	10	10	10	10	10	8	2	82	92
Maphutha Dolo		22 (substituted on)									1	0	0	0
Aranos Coetzee			3				3	3	3	3	5	0	0	0
Nico Lee			13	13	13	13	12	12	12	12	8	4	0	20
Michael van der Spuy				22 (substituted on)	12	22 (substituted on)					3	1	0	5
Armandt Koster					18 (substituted on)	18 (substituted on)	18 (substituted on)		18 (substituted on)	18 (substituted on)	5	0	0	0
Tienie Burger					19	19 (substituted on)	19 (substituted on)	19 (substituted on)			3	0	0	0
Elandré Huggett							16 (substituted on)				1	1	0	5
Zee Mkhabela							20 (substituted on)	20 (substituted on)			2	0	0	0
Boela Serfontein								18 (substituted on)			1	0	0	0
Conraad van Vuuren									23 (substituted on)	23 (substituted on)	2	0	0	0
penalty try											–	2	–	10
Total											10	57	172	457
Luan de Bruin, Reinhardt Erwee, Tertius Kruger, Mosolwa Mafuma, Danie Mienie, Oupa Mohojé, Gerhard Olivier, Boom Prinsloo, Neil Rautenbach, JP Smith, BG Uys, Ruan van Rensburg and Dennis Visser were named in the Currie Cup Premier Division squad, but not included in a matchday squad.

Golden Lions
Name	PMA	GRQ	BOL	BUL	WPr	FSC	EPK	SHA	SF	F	App	Try	Kck	Pts
Corné Fourie	1	17 (substituted on)	1	17 (substituted on)					17 (substituted on)	—N/a	5	1	0	5
Akker van der Merwe	2	2		16 (substituted on)	16 (substituted on)	16 (substituted on)			16 (substituted on)	—N/a	6	2	0	10
Jacques van Rooyen	3	3		3	17 (substituted on)			17 (substituted on)	1	—N/a	6	0	0	0
Martin Muller	4		5	4		18 (substituted on)				—N/a	4	0	0	0
Lourens Erasmus	5	5		5	5				19 (substituted on)	—N/a	5	1	0	5
Stephan de Wit	6	6	6					20 (substituted on)		—N/a	4	0	0	0
Cyle Brink	7	7	19 (substituted on)	7	19 (substituted on)	7	19 (substituted on)	7	7	—N/a	9	2	0	10
Ruan Ackermann	8	8	4	8	7	19 (substituted on)	7	4	4	—N/a	9	1	0	5
Ross Cronjé	9	9	20 (substituted on)	9	9	9	20 (substituted on)	9	9	—N/a	9	0	0	0
Jaco van der Walt	10	10		21 (substituted on)	10	10	10	10	10	—N/a	8	1	63	68
Anthony Volmink	11	11	11	11	11	11	11	11	11	—N/a	9	5	0	25
Howard Mnisi	12	12	12	12	22 (substituted on)	22 (substituted on)	12	13		—N/a	8	7	0	35
Stokkies Hanekom	13	13							22 (substituted on)	—N/a	3	0	0	0
Koch Marx	14		21 (substituted on)				14		14	—N/a	4	2	0	10
Sylvian Mahuza	15	15					15	22 (substituted on)	23 (substituted on)	—N/a	5	5	0	25
Ramone Samuels	16 (substituted on)	16 (substituted on)	2							—N/a	3	0	0	0
Justin Ackerman	17 (substituted on)									—N/a	1	0	0	0
MB Lusaseni	18 (substituted on)	4								—N/a	2	0	0	0
Victor Sekekete	19 (substituted on)		7	18 (substituted on)						—N/a	3	1	0	5
Dillon Smit	20 (substituted on)	20 (substituted on)	9	20 (substituted on)			9	21 (substituted on)		—N/a	6	1	0	5
Marnitz Boshoff	21 (substituted on)	21 (substituted on)	10	10						—N/a	4	1	30	35
Jacques Nel	22 (substituted on)	22 (substituted on)	13	22 (substituted on)	13	13	13	14	13	—N/a	9	4	0	20
Dylan Smith		1	17 (substituted on)	1	1	1	1	1		—N/a	7	1	0	5
Courtnall Skosan		14		14						—N/a	2	0	0	0
Bobby de Wee		18 (substituted on)	18 (substituted on)				5	5	5	—N/a	5	0	0	0
Ruaan Lerm		19 (substituted on)	8		20 (substituted on)	20 (substituted on)	8	8	20 (substituted on)	—N/a	7	1	0	5
Pieter Scholtz			3			17 (substituted on)				—N/a	2	0	0	0
Selom Gavor			14		14	14				—N/a	3	2	0	10
Andries Coetzee			15	15	15	15	22 (substituted on)	15	15	—N/a	7	1	19	24
Robbie Coetzee			16 (substituted on)	2	2	2	16 (substituted on)	2		—N/a	6	2	0	10
JW Bell			22 (substituted on)							—N/a	1	1	0	5
Kwagga Smith				6	6	6	6	6	6	—N/a	6	7	0	35
Rohan Janse van Rensburg				13	12	12	21 (substituted on)	12	12	—N/a	6	2	0	10
Fabian Booysen				19 (substituted on)	8	8	18 (substituted on)	19 (substituted on)	8	—N/a	6	0	0	0
Ruan Dreyer					3	3	17 (substituted on)	3	18 (substituted on)	—N/a	5	0	0	0
JP du Preez					4	4	4	18 (substituted on)		—N/a	4	1	0	5
Andries Ferreira					18 (substituted on)	5				—N/a	2	0	0	0
Ashlon Davids					21 (substituted on)	21				—N/a	1	0	0	0
Malcolm Marx							2	16 (substituted on)	2	—N/a	3	0	0	0
Julian Redelinghuys							3		3	—N/a	2	0	0	0
Faf de Klerk									21 (substituted on)	—N/a	1	0	0	0
Total											9	52	112	372

Griquas
Name	SHA	LIO	PMA	EPK	BOL	BUL	WPr	FSC	SF	F	App	Try	Kck	Pts
Steph Roberts	1	1	1	1			1	1	—N/a	—N/a	6	0	0	0
Marius Fourie	2	16 (substituted on)	16 (substituted on)	16 (substituted on)	16 (substituted on)	16 (substituted on)	16 (substituted on)	2	—N/a	—N/a	8	0	0	0
Stephan Kotzé	3	3	3	3		3	3		—N/a	—N/a	6	1	0	5
Mzwanele Zito	4	4	4		18 (substituted on)	4		5	—N/a	—N/a	6	0	0	0
Jono Janse van Rensburg	5	5	5	5	5	5	8	7	—N/a	—N/a	8	1	0	5
Wendal Wehr	6	6	6	6	6	6	6	6	—N/a	—N/a	8	2	0	10
RJ Liebenberg (c)	7								—N/a	—N/a	1	0	0	0
Jason Fraser	8	8	8	8	8	8	19 (substituted on)	8	—N/a	—N/a	8	1	0	5
Rudi van Rooyen	9	9	9	9	9	9	9		—N/a	—N/a	7	5	0	25
Clinton Swart	10	12	12	12	12	12	12		—N/a	—N/a	7	1	82	87
Alshaun Bock	11	11	11	11	11	11		11	—N/a	—N/a	7	4	0	20
Johnathan Francke	12	13	13		13	13	13	13	—N/a	—N/a	7	1	0	5
JW Jonker	13	14	14	13			14		—N/a	—N/a	5	2	0	10
Ederies Arendse	14			14	14	14	11	14	—N/a	—N/a	6	2	0	10
AJ Coertzen	15	15	15	15	15	15	15	15	—N/a	—N/a	8	4	0	20
AJ le Roux	16 (substituted on)	2	2	2	2	2	2		—N/a	—N/a	7	0	0	0
Devon Martinus	17 (substituted on)	17 (substituted on)		17 (substituted on)	1	17 (substituted on)	17 (substituted on)	17 (substituted on)	—N/a	—N/a	7	0	0	0
Liam Hendricks	18 (substituted on)		17 (substituted on)		17 (substituted on)	1		3	—N/a	—N/a	5	0	0	0
Sias Koen	19 (substituted on)	7	7	7	7	7	7		—N/a	—N/a	7	0	0	0
Steph Vermeulen	20 (substituted on)	18 (substituted on)							—N/a	—N/a	2	0	0	0
Renier Botha	21 (substituted on)	20 (substituted on)	20 (substituted on)	20 (substituted on)	20 (substituted on)	20 (substituted on)	20 (substituted on)	9	—N/a	—N/a	8	1	0	5
Elgar Watts	22 (substituted on)	10	10	10	10	10	10	10	—N/a	—N/a	8	2	0	10
Thabo Mabuza		19 (substituted on)		19 (substituted on)	19 (substituted on)			19 (substituted on)	—N/a	—N/a	4	0	0	0
André Swarts		21 (substituted on)	21	21 (substituted on)	21 (substituted on)	21 (substituted on)	21 (substituted on)	12	—N/a	—N/a	6	2	16	26
Eric Zana		22 (substituted on)	22 (substituted on)	22 (substituted on)	22 (substituted on)	22 (substituted on)	22 (substituted on)	20 (substituted on)	—N/a	—N/a	7	1	2	7
Hilton Lobberts			18 (substituted on)				4		—N/a	—N/a	2	0	0	0
Steven Meiring			19 (substituted on)	18 (substituted on)				18 (substituted on)	—N/a	—N/a	3	0	0	0
Wandile Putuma				4	4	18 (substituted on)	5		—N/a	—N/a	4	2	0	10
Chase Morison					3				—N/a	—N/a	1	0	0	0
Jonathan Adendorf						19 (substituted on)	18 (substituted on)	4	—N/a	—N/a	3	1	0	5
Sidney Tobias								16 (substituted on)	—N/a	—N/a	1	0	0	0
Steven Moir								21 (substituted on)	—N/a	—N/a	1	0	0	0
Ntabeni Dukisa								22 (substituted on)	—N/a	—N/a	1	0	0	0
Total											8	33	100	265
Tiaan Dorfling was named in the Currie Cup Premier Division squad, but not included in a matchday squad.

Pumas
Name	SHA	LIO	GRQ	BOL	BUL	WPr	FSC	EPK	SF	F	App	Try	Kck	Pts
Khwezi Mona	1	1				1	1		—N/a	—N/a	4	1	0	5
Frank Herne	2	16 (substituted on)	2	2	2	2	2	2	—N/a	—N/a	8	7	0	35
De-Jay Terblanche	3	17 (substituted on)	1	1	1	17 (substituted on)	17 (substituted on)	1	—N/a	—N/a	8	0	0	0
Stephan Greeff	4				18 (substituted on)	4	4		—N/a	—N/a	4	0	0	0
Hugo Kloppers (c)	5	5	18 (substituted on)	5		18 (substituted on)		18 (substituted on)	—N/a	—N/a	6	0	0	0
Marnus Schoeman	6	6	6	6					—N/a	—N/a	4	1	0	5
Lambert Groenewald	7			19 (substituted on)	7	7	7		—N/a	—N/a	5	0	0	0
Carel Greeff	8	19 (substituted on)	19 (substituted on)		19 (substituted on)	19 (substituted on)	19 (substituted on)	7	—N/a	—N/a	7	0	0	0
Reynier van Rooyen	9	9							—N/a	—N/a	2	0	0	0
Francois Brummer	10	10	10	10	10	10	10		—N/a	—N/a	7	0	46	46
Marcello Sampson	11	11							—N/a	—N/a	2	0	0	0
Marlou van Niekerk	12	12	21 (substituted on)	21 (substituted on)	12				—N/a	—N/a	5	1	0	5
Hennie Skorbinski	13	13	13		13	12	12		—N/a	—N/a	6	0	0	0
JP Lewis	14	14	11	11	11	11	11	11	—N/a	—N/a	8	3	0	15
Justin van Staden	15	15							—N/a	—N/a	2	1	0	5
François du Toit	16 (substituted on)	2							—N/a	—N/a	2	0	0	0
Jacques Kotzé	17 (substituted on)		17 (substituted on)	17 (substituted on)					—N/a	—N/a	3	0	0	0
Wiehan Hay	18 (substituted on)	4	4	18 (substituted on)	4				—N/a	—N/a	5	0	0	0
Dylan Peterson	19 (substituted on)								—N/a	—N/a	1	0	0	0
Emile Temperman	20 (substituted on)	20 (substituted on)	9	9	9	9	20 (substituted on)	9	—N/a	—N/a	8	0	0	0
Deon Helberg	21 (substituted on)	21 (substituted on)						21 (substituted on)	—N/a	—N/a	3	0	0	0
Devon Williams	22 (substituted on)	22 (substituted on)	15	15	15	15	21 (substituted on)	15	—N/a	—N/a	8	1	6	11
Louis Albertse		3	3		17 (substituted on)	3	3	3	—N/a	—N/a	6	0	0	0
Nardus van der Walt		7	7	7					—N/a	—N/a	3	0	0	0
Renaldo Bothma		8	8	8	8	8	8	8	—N/a	—N/a	7	2	0	10
Jannie Stander		18 (substituted on)	5	4	5	5	5	5	—N/a	—N/a	7	1	0	5
Leighton van Wyk			12	12	21 (substituted on)			12	—N/a	—N/a	4	1	0	5
Bernado Botha			14	14	14				—N/a	—N/a	3	0	0	0
Simon Westraadt			16 (substituted on)	16 (substituted on)	16 (substituted on)	16 (substituted on)	16 (substituted on)	16 (substituted on)	—N/a	—N/a	6	0	0	0
Kevin Luiters			20 (substituted on)	20 (substituted on)	20 (substituted on)	20 (substituted on)	9	20 (substituted on)	—N/a	—N/a	6	2	0	10
Tyler Fisher			22 (substituted on)	13		22 (substituted on)	22 (substituted on)	14	—N/a	—N/a	5	1	0	5
Marné Coetzee				3	3			17 (substituted on)	—N/a	—N/a	3	0	0	0
Ruwellyn Isbell				22 (substituted on)	22 (substituted on)	14	14	22 (substituted on)	—N/a	—N/a	5	1	0	5
Brian Shabangu					6	6	6	6	—N/a	—N/a	4	1	0	5
Hoffmann Maritz						13	13	13	—N/a	—N/a	3	0	0	0
Heinrich Steyl						21 (substituted on)	15	10	—N/a	—N/a	3	0	6	6
Jeremy Jordaan							18 (substituted on)	4	—N/a	—N/a	2	0	0	0
Reuben Johannes				—N/a	—N/a			19 (substituted on)	—N/a	—N/a	1	0	0	0
Total											8	24	58	178
Johan Herbst, Rassie Jansen van Vuuren, Wilmaure Louw and Sabelo Nhlapo were named in the Currie Cup Premier Division squad, but not included in a matchday squad.

Sharks
Name	PMA	GRQ	BOL	BUL	WPr	FSC	EPK	LIO	SF	F	App	Try	Kck	Pts
Dale Chadwick	1	1	1						—N/a	—N/a	3	0	0	0
Franco Marais	2	2	16 (substituted on)	2	2	2	16 (substituted on)	16 (substituted on)	—N/a	—N/a	8	2	0	10
Lourens Adriaanse	3							3	—N/a	—N/a	2	0	0	0
Etienne Oosthuizen	4	4	4	4	4	4	4	4	—N/a	—N/a	8	2	0	10
Stephan Lewies	5	5						18 (substituted on)	—N/a	—N/a	3	0	0	0
Keegan Daniel (c)	6	6	6	6	6			8	—N/a	—N/a	6	0	0	0
Jean-Luc du Preez	7			7	7	7	7	7	—N/a	—N/a	6	2	0	10
Philip van der Walt	8	7	8	8	8	8			—N/a	—N/a	6	0	0	0
Michael Claassens	9	20 (substituted on)			20 (substituted on)	20 (substituted on)	9	9	—N/a	—N/a	6	2	0	10
Curwin Bosch	10	15	15	15	15	15	15	15	—N/a	—N/a	8	1	101	106
S'bura Sithole	11	11	11	21 (substituted on)	11	11			—N/a	—N/a	6	2	0	10
André Esterhuizen	12	12	12	12	12	12	12	12	—N/a	—N/a	8	4	0	20
Lukhanyo Am	13	13		13	13	13	13	13	—N/a	—N/a	7	0	0	0
Neil Maritz	14	14					22 (substituted on)	22 (substituted on)	—N/a	—N/a	4	0	0	0
Odwa Ndungane	15		14	14	14	14			—N/a	—N/a	5	2	0	10
Chiliboy Ralepelle	16 (substituted on)	16 (substituted on)	2	16 (substituted on)	16 (substituted on)	16 (substituted on)	2	2	—N/a	—N/a	8	2	0	10
Thomas du Toit	17 (substituted on)	3	3	3	3	3	1	1	—N/a	—N/a	8	1	0	5
Ruan Botha	18 (substituted on)	18 (substituted on)	5	5	5	5	5	5	—N/a	—N/a	8	2	0	10
Tera Mtembu	19 (substituted on)	8	7						—N/a	—N/a	3	1	0	5
Stefan Ungerer	20 (substituted on)	9	9	9	9	9	20 (substituted on)	20 (substituted on)	—N/a	—N/a	8	1	0	5
Inny Radebe	21 (substituted on)	10	10	10	10	10	10	10	—N/a	—N/a	8	2	0	10
Heimar Williams	22 (substituted on)	21 (substituted on)	13		21 (substituted on)				—N/a	—N/a	4	0	0	0
John-Hubert Meyer		17 (substituted on)	17 (substituted on)	17 (substituted on)	17 (substituted on)	17 (substituted on)	3	17 (substituted on)	—N/a	—N/a	7	0	0	0
Jean Deysel		19 (substituted on)	19 (substituted on)	19 (substituted on)	19 (substituted on)		19 (substituted on)		—N/a	—N/a	5	1	0	5
Rhyno Smith		22 (substituted on)		22 (substituted on)	22 (substituted on)	22 (substituted on)	14	14	—N/a	—N/a	6	1	0	5
JC Astle			18 (substituted on)	18 (substituted on)					—N/a	—N/a	2	0	0	0
Hanco Venter			20 (substituted on)	20 (substituted on)					—N/a	—N/a	2	1	0	5
Wandile Mjekevu			21 (substituted on)			21 (substituted on)	11	11	—N/a	—N/a	4	1	0	5
Garth April			22 (substituted on)					21 (substituted on)	—N/a	—N/a	2	0	2	2
Lwazi Mvovo				11					—N/a	—N/a	1	0	0	0
Juan Schoeman				1	1	1	17 (substituted on)		—N/a	—N/a	4	0	0	0
Jean Droste					18 (substituted on)	18	18 (substituted on)		—N/a	—N/a	2	0	0	0
Francois Kleinhans						6	8	6	—N/a	—N/a	3	2	0	10
Khaya Majola						19 (substituted on)	6	19 (substituted on)	—N/a	—N/a	3	1	0	5
Patrick Lambie							21 (substituted on)		—N/a	—N/a	1	0	4	4
Total											8	33	107	272
Hyron Andrews, Stephan Coetzee, Dan du Preez, Johan du Toit, Benhard Janse van Rensburg, Morné Joubert, Marius Louw, Tendai Mtawarira, S'busiso Nkosi, Coenie Oosthuizen and Cobus Reinach were named in the Currie Cup Premier Division squad, but not included in a matchday squad.

Western Province
Name	BUL	FSC	EPK	SHA	LIO	PMA	GRQ	BOL	SF	F	App	Try	Kck	Pts
Alistair Vermaak	1	1	17 (substituted on)	17 (substituted on)	17 (substituted on)	1	17 (substituted on)	1	17 (substituted on)	—N/a	9	0	0	0
Scarra Ntubeni	2	2	2	2						—N/a	4	0	0	0
Wilco Louw	3	3	3	3	3	3	3	3	3	—N/a	9	0	0	0
JD Schickerling	4		4	4					19 (substituted on)	—N/a	4	0	0	0
Chris van Zyl (c)	5	5	5	5	5	5	5	5	5	—N/a	9	0	0	0
Rynhardt Elstadt	6	6			6		6	6	6	—N/a	6	0	0	0
Jurie van Vuuren	7	19 (substituted on)	6	20 (substituted on)	7	19 (substituted on)	20 (substituted on)	20 (substituted on)		—N/a	8	0	0	0
Jacques Vermeulen	8				19 (substituted on)	20 (substituted on)				—N/a	3	2	0	10
Jano Vermaak	9	9	9	9	9		21 (substituted on)	9	21 (substituted on)	—N/a	8	1	0	5
Robert du Preez	10	21 (substituted on)	22 (substituted on)	10	10	10	10	10	10	—N/a	9	0	86	86
Leolin Zas	11	11	11	11	11	11	11	11	11	—N/a	9	6	0	30
Daniël du Plessis	12		12							—N/a	2	0	0	0
Huw Jones	13	12	13			12	12		12	—N/a	6	7	0	35
Khanyo Ngcukana	14									—N/a	1	0	0	0
Scott van Breda	15			22 (substituted on)	22 (substituted on)	22 (substituted on)	22 (substituted on)	14	23 (substituted on)	—N/a	7	2	0	10
Chad Solomon	16 (substituted on)									—N/a	1	0	0	0
Oli Kebble	17 (substituted on)		18 (substituted on)							—N/a	2	0	0	0
JP Smith	18 (substituted on)	18 (substituted on)		18 (substituted on)	18 (substituted on)	18 (substituted on)	18 (substituted on)	18 (substituted on)	18 (substituted on)	—N/a	8	0	0	0
Kobus van Dyk	19 (substituted on)	7	7	7	8	6	7	7	7	—N/a	9	2	0	10
Godlen Masimla	20 (substituted on)	20 (substituted on)	21 (substituted on)			9				—N/a	4	0	0	0
Brandon Thomson	21 (substituted on)	10	10							—N/a	3	0	20	20
Johnny Kôtze	22 (substituted on)	13		12	12			13	22 (substituted on)	—N/a	6	2	0	10
Jan de Klerk		4	19 (substituted on)	19 (substituted on)	4	4	4	4	4	—N/a	8	2	0	10
Sikhumbuzo Notshe		8	8	8						—N/a	3	1	0	5
Kobus van Wyk		14								—N/a	1	1	0	5
Jaco Taute		15								—N/a	1	0	0	0
Martin Ferreira		16 (substituted on)								—N/a	1	0	0	0
JC Janse van Rensburg		17 (substituted on)	1	1	1		1	17 (substituted on)	1	—N/a	7	0	0	0
Cheslin Kolbe		22 (substituted on)	15	15	15	15	15	15	15	—N/a	8	0	0	0
Werner Kok			14	14	14	14	14	22 (substituted on)	14	—N/a	7	4	0	20
Neil Rautenbach			16 (substituted on)	16 (substituted on)	16 (substituted on)	16 (substituted on)		16		—N/a	4	0	0	0
Stefan Willemse			20 (substituted on)	6		7			20 (substituted on)	—N/a	4	0	0	0
EW Viljoen				13	13	13				—N/a	3	2	0	10
Dewaldt Duvenage				21 (substituted on)	21 (substituted on)	21 (substituted on)	9		9	—N/a	5	1	0	5
Mike Willemse					2	2	16 (substituted on)	2	16 (substituted on)	—N/a	5	0	0	0
Eital Bredenkamp					20 (substituted on)					—N/a	1	0	0	0
Nizaam Carr						8	8	8	8	—N/a	4	2	0	10
Sti Sithole						17 (substituted on)				—N/a	1	0	0	0
Bongi Mbonambi							2		2	—N/a	2	1	0	5
Juan de Jongh							13		13	—N/a	2	1	0	5
David Ribbans							19 (substituted on)	19 (substituted on)		—N/a	2	1	0	5
Damian de Allende								12		—N/a	1	0	0	0
Justin Phillips								21		—N/a	0	0	0	0
Total											9	38	106	296
Beyers de Villiers and Janco Venter were named in the Currie Cup Premier Division squad, but not included in a matchday squad.

For each team, (c) denotes the team captain. For each match, the player's squad number is shown. Starting players are numbered 1 to 15, while the replacements are numbered 16 to 22. If a replacement made an appearance in the match, it is indicated by (substituted on) . "App" refers to the number of appearances made by the player, "Try" to the number of tries scored by the player, "Kck" to the number of points scored via kicks (conversions, penalties or drop goals) and "Pts" refer to the total number of points scored by the player.

=== Points scorers ===
The following table contain points scored in the 2016 Currie Cup Premier Division:

Top Ten point scorers
No	Player	Team	T	C	P	DG	Pts
1	Tian Schoeman	Blue Bulls	2	35	22	0	146
2	Curwin Bosch	Sharks	1	19	20	1	106
3	Niel Marais	Free State Cheetahs	2	20	14	0	92
4	Fred Zeilinga	Free State Cheetahs	0	24	14	0	90
5	Clinton Swart	Griquas	1	23	12	0	87
6	Robert du Preez	Western Province	0	22	14	0	86
7	Jaco van der Walt	Golden Lions	1	21	7	0	68
8	Francois Brummer	Pumas	0	8	9	1	46
9	Theuns Kotzé	Boland Cavaliers	2	12	2	1	43
10	Marnitz Boshoff	Golden Lions	1	12	2	0	35
10	Frank Herne	Pumas	7	0	0	0	35
10	Huw Jones	Western Province	7	0	0	0	35
10	Howard Mnisi	Golden Lions	7	0	0	0	35
10	Kwagga Smith	Golden Lions	7	0	0	0	35
10	Jamba Ulengo	Blue Bulls	7	0	0	0	35

Other point scorers
No	Player	Team	T	C	P	DG	Pts
16	Rayno Benjamin	Free State Cheetahs	6	0	0	0	30
16	Leolin Zas	Western Province	6	0	0	0	30
18	André Swarts	Griquas	2	5	2	0	26
19	Pieter-Steyn de Wet	Eastern Province Kings	0	6	4	1	27
20	Sylvian Mahuza	Golden Lions	5	0	0	0	25
20	Sergeal Petersen	Free State Cheetahs	5	0	0	0	25
20	Rudi van Rooyen	Griquas	5	0	0	0	25
20	Shaun Venter	Free State Cheetahs	5	0	0	0	25
20	Anthony Volmink	Golden Lions	5	0	0	0	25
25	Andries Coetzee	Golden Lions	1	5	3	0	24
26	Nico Scheepers	Boland Cavaliers	0	5	4	0	22
27	Kobus Marais	Eastern Province Kings	0	3	5	0	21
28	Bjorn Basson	Blue Bulls	4	0	0	0	20
28	Alshaun Bock	Griquas	4	0	0	0	20
28	Uzair Cassiem	Free State Cheetahs	4	0	0	0	20
28	AJ Coertzen	Griquas	4	0	0	0	20
28	André Esterhuizen	Sharks	4	0	0	0	20
28	Werner Kok	Western Province	4	0	0	0	20
28	Nico Lee	Free State Cheetahs	4	0	0	0	20
28	Jacques Nel	Golden Lions	4	0	0	0	20
28	Paul Schoeman	Free State Cheetahs	4	0	0	0	20
28	Brandon Thomson	Western Province	0	7	2	0	20
28	Piet van Zyl	Blue Bulls	4	0	0	0	20
39	Adriaan Carelse	Boland Cavaliers	3	1	0	0	17
40	Joshua Stander	Blue Bulls	2	3	0	0	16
41	Ulrich Beyers	Blue Bulls	3	0	0	0	15
41	Clayton Blommetjies	Free State Cheetahs	3	0	0	0	15
41	Danwel Demas	Boland Cavaliers	3	0	0	0	15
41	Travis Ismaiel	Blue Bulls	3	0	0	0	15
41	JP Lewis	Pumas	3	0	0	0	15
41	Hanro Liebenberg	Blue Bulls	3	0	0	0	15
41	Tian Meyer	Free State Cheetahs	3	0	0	0	15
41	Raymond Rhule	Free State Cheetahs	3	0	0	0	15
41	Johann Tromp	Eastern Province Kings	3	0	0	0	15
41	Francois Venter	Free State Cheetahs	3	0	0	0	15
51	Devon Williams	Pumas	1	3	0	0	11
52	Shaun Adendorff	Boland Cavaliers	2	0	0	0	10
52	Ederies Arendse	Griquas	2	0	0	0	10
52	Ruan Botha	Sharks	2	0	0	0	10
52	Renaldo Bothma	Pumas	2	0	0	0	10
52	Cyle Brink	Golden Lions	2	0	0	0	10
52	Nizaam Carr	Western Province	2	0	0	0	10
52	Michael Claassens	Sharks	2	0	0	0	10
52	Robbie Coetzee	Golden Lions	2	0	0	0	10
52	Nick de Jager	Blue Bulls	2	0	0	0	10
52	Jan de Klerk	Western Province	2	0	0	0	10
52	Jean-Luc du Preez	Sharks	2	0	0	0	10
52	Selom Gavor	Golden Lions	2	0	0	0	10
52	Alcino Izaacs	Eastern Province Kings	2	0	0	0	10
52	Rohan Janse van Rensburg	Golden Lions	2	0	0	0	10
52	Jason Jenkins	Blue Bulls	2	0	0	0	10
52	JW Jonker	Griquas	2	0	0	0	10
52	Zandré Jordaan	Boland Cavaliers	2	0	0	0	10
52	Jannes Kirsten	Blue Bulls	2	0	0	0	10
52	Berton Klaasen	Eastern Province Kings	2	0	0	0	10
52	Francois Kleinhans	Sharks	2	0	0	0	10
52	Johnny Kôtze	Western Province	2	0	0	0	10
52	Kevin Luiters	Pumas	2	0	0	0	10
52	Charles Marais	Free State Cheetahs	2	0	0	0	10
52	Franco Marais	Sharks	2	0	0	0	10
52	Koch Marx	Golden Lions	2	0	0	0	10
52	Ox Nché	Free State Cheetahs	2	0	0	0	10
52	Odwa Ndungane	Sharks	2	0	0	0	10
52	Etienne Oosthuizen	Sharks	2	0	0	0	10
52	Marvin Orie	Blue Bulls	2	0	0	0	10
52	Wandile Putuma	Griquas	2	0	0	0	10
52	Inny Radebe	Sharks	2	0	0	0	10
52	Chiliboy Ralepelle	Sharks	2	0	0	0	10
52	S'bura Sithole	Sharks	2	0	0	0	10
52	William Small-Smith	Free State Cheetahs	2	0	0	0	10
52	Sergio Torrens	Boland Cavaliers	2	0	0	0	10
52	Scott van Breda	Western Province	2	0	0	0	10
52	Akker van der Merwe	Golden Lions	2	0	0	0	10
52	Kobus van Dyk	Western Province	2	0	0	0	10
52	Jacques Vermeulen	Western Province	2	0	0	0	10
52	EW Viljoen	Western Province	2	0	0	0	10
52	Elgar Watts	Griquas	2	0	0	0	10
52	Wendal Wehr	Griquas	2	0	0	0	10
94	Lungelo Gosa	Eastern Province Kings	0	3	1	0	9
95	Eric Zana	Griquas	1	1	0	0	7
96	Heinrich Steyl	Pumas	0	3	0	0	6
97	Ruan Ackermann	Golden Lions	1	0	0	0	5
97	Jonathan Adendorf	Griquas	1	0	0	0	5
97	JW Bell	Golden Lions	1	0	0	0	5
97	Martin Bezuidenhout	Eastern Province Kings	1	0	0	0	5
97	Christopher Bosch	Boland Cavaliers	1	0	0	0	5
97	Renier Botha	Griquas	1	0	0	0	5
97	Tom Botha	Free State Cheetahs	1	0	0	0	5
97	Brandon Brown	Eastern Province Kings	1	0	0	0	5
97	Cullen Collopy	Eastern Province Kings	1	0	0	0	5
97	Kenan Cronjé	Boland Cavaliers	1	0	0	0	5
97	Juan de Jongh	Western Province	1	0	0	0	5
97	Jean Deysel	Sharks	1	0	0	0	5
97	JP du Preez	Golden Lions	1	0	0	0	5
97	Thomas du Toit	Sharks	1	0	0	0	5
97	Dewaldt Duvenage	Western Province	1	0	0	0	5
97	Jacques Engelbrecht	Boland Cavaliers	1	0	0	0	5
97	Lourens Erasmus	Golden Lions	1	0	0	0	5
97	Tyler Fisher	Pumas	1	0	0	0	5
97	Corné Fourie	Golden Lions	1	0	0	0	5
97	Johnathan Francke	Griquas	1	0	0	0	5
97	Jason Fraser	Griquas	1	0	0	0	5
97	Lizo Gqoboka	Blue Bulls	1	0	0	0	5
97	JC Greyling	Eastern Province Kings	1	0	0	0	5
97	Francois Hanekom	Boland Cavaliers	1	0	0	0	5
97	Joubert Horn	Boland Cavaliers	1	0	0	0	5
97	Elandré Huggett	Free State Cheetahs	1	0	0	0	5
97	Reniel Hugo	Free State Cheetahs	1	0	0	0	5
97	Ruwellyn Isbell	Pumas	1	0	0	0	5
97	Jono Janse van Rensburg	Griquas	1	0	0	0	5
97	Vince Jobo	Eastern Province Kings	1	0	0	0	5
97	Niell Jordaan	Free State Cheetahs	1	0	0	0	5
97	Stephan Kotzé	Griquas	1	0	0	0	5
97	Ruaan Lerm	Golden Lions	1	0	0	0	5
97	Clemen Lewis	Boland Cavaliers	1	0	0	0	5
97	Robbie Louw	Boland Cavaliers	1	0	0	0	5
97	Khaya Majola	Sharks	1	0	0	0	5
97	Sampie Mastriet	Eastern Province Kings	1	0	0	0	5
97	Bongi Mbonambi	Western Province	1	0	0	0	5
97	Wandile Mjekevu	Sharks	1	0	0	0	5
97	Khwezi Mona	Pumas	1	0	0	0	5
97	Tera Mtembu	Sharks	1	0	0	0	5
97	Ryan Nell	Boland Cavaliers	1	0	0	0	5
97	Sikhumbuzo Notshe	Western Province	1	0	0	0	5
97	Burger Odendaal	Blue Bulls	1	0	0	0	5
97	Craig Pheiffer	Boland Cavaliers	1	0	0	0	5
97	David Ribbans	Western Province	1	0	0	0	5
97	Marnus Schoeman	Pumas	1	0	0	0	5
97	Ricky Schroeder	Eastern Province Kings	1	0	0	0	5
97	Victor Sekekete	Golden Lions	1	0	0	0	5
97	Brian Shabangu	Pumas	1	0	0	0	5
97	Dillon Smit	Golden Lions	1	0	0	0	5
97	Roelof Smit	Blue Bulls	1	0	0	0	5
97	Dylan Smith	Golden Lions	1	0	0	0	5
97	Rhyno Smith	Sharks	1	0	0	0	5
97	RG Snyman	Blue Bulls	1	0	0	0	5
97	Siviwe Soyizwapi	Eastern Province Kings	1	0	0	0	5
97	Jannie Stander	Pumas	1	0	0	0	5
97	Ruan Steenkamp	Blue Bulls	1	0	0	0	5
97	Jade Stighling	Blue Bulls	1	0	0	0	5
97	Stefan Ungerer	Sharks	1	0	0	0	5
97	Michael van der Spuy	Free State Cheetahs	1	0	0	0	5
97	Torsten van Jaarsveld	Free State Cheetahs	1	0	0	0	5
97	Marlou van Niekerk	Pumas	1	0	0	0	5
97	Justin van Staden	Pumas	1	0	0	0	5
97	Kobus van Wyk	Western Province	1	0	0	0	5
97	Leighton van Wyk	Pumas	1	0	0	0	5
97	Ivan van Zyl	Blue Bulls	1	0	0	0	5
97	Hanco Venter	Sharks	1	0	0	0	5
97	Henco Venter	Free State Cheetahs	1	0	0	0	5
97	Jano Vermaak	Western Province	1	0	0	0	5
97	Mike Willemse	Eastern Province Kings / Western Province	1	0	0	0	5
97	Wayne Wilschut	Boland Cavaliers	1	0	0	0	5
169	Patrick Lambie	Sharks	0	2	0	0	4
170	Garth April	Sharks	0	1	0	0	2
—	penalty try	Free State Cheetahs	2	0	0	0	10
—	penalty try	Blue Bulls	1	0	0	0	5
* Legend: T = Tries, C = Conversions, P = Penalties, DG = Drop Goals, Pts = Points.

=== Discipline ===
The following table contains all the cards handed out during the tournament:

Red cards or multiple yellow cards
Player	Team	Red card	Temporarily suspended
Tyler Fisher	Pumas	1	0
Shaun Adendorff	Boland Cavaliers	0	2
Jean-Luc du Preez	Sharks	0	2
Clemen Lewis	Boland Cavaliers	0	2
Etienne Oosthuizen	Eastern Province Kings	0	2
RG Snyman	Blue Bulls	0	2
Jaco van der Walt	Golden Lions	0	2

Single yellow cards
Player	Team	Red card	Temporarily suspended
Rayno Benjamin	Free State Cheetahs	0	1
Clayton Blommetjies	Free State Cheetahs	0	1
Fabian Booysen	Golden Lions	0	1
Cyle Brink	Golden Lions	0	1
Brandon Brown	Eastern Province Kings	0	1
Christiaan de Bruin	Eastern Province Kings	0	1
Bobby de Wee	Golden Lions	0	1
André Esterhuizen	Sharks	0	1
Tazz Fuzani	Eastern Province Kings	0	1
Carel Greeff	Pumas	0	1
Francois Hanekom	Boland Cavaliers	0	1
Frank Herne	Pumas	0	1
Marnus Hugo	Boland Cavaliers	0	1
Alcino Izaacs	Eastern Province Kings	0	1
Francois Kleinhans	Sharks	0	1
AJ le Roux	Griquas	0	1
Paul Schoeman	Free State Cheetahs	0	1
Siviwe Soyizwapi	Eastern Province Kings	0	1
Ruan Steenkamp	Blue Bulls	0	1
De-Jay Terblanche	Pumas	0	1
Jamba Ulengo	Blue Bulls	0	1
Akker van der Merwe	Golden Lions	0	1
Jacques van Rooyen	Golden Lions	0	1
Leighton van Wyk	Pumas	0	1
Stefan Willemse	Western Province	0	1
Mzwanele Zito	Griquas	0	1
* Legend: (red card) = Sent off, (yellow card) = Sin-binned

== Referees ==
The following referees officiated matches in the 2016 Currie Cup Premier Division:

2016 Currie Cup Premier Division referees
Referees	Stuart Berry • Rodney Boneparte • Quinton Immelman • AJ Jacobs • Cwengile Jadezweni • Craig Joubert • Shuhei Kubo • Pro Legoete • Jaco Peyper • Rasta Rasivhenge • Alexandre Ruiz • Marius van der Westhuizen • Jaco van Heerden

== See also ==
- 2016 Currie Cup First Division
- 2016 Currie Cup qualification
- 2016 Under-21 Provincial Championship
- 2016 Under-20 Provincial Championship
- 2016 Under-19 Provincial Championship
