= Lungelo Gosa =

South African rugby union player

- Born: 31 January 1995 (age 31) King William's Town, South Africa
- Height: 1.78 m (5 ft 10 in)
- Weight: 80 kg (180 lb; 12 st 8 lb)
- School: Selborne College, East London

Rugby union career
- Position: Fly-half / Fullback
- Current team: SWD Eagles
Youth career
- 2011–2013: Border Bulldogs
- 2015: Golden Lions
Senior career
Years	Team	Apps	(Points)
2016	Eastern Province Kings	7	(9)
2017–2019	Leopards	27	(30)
2021	Border Bulldogs	4	(0)
2022–	SWD Eagles		
- Correct as of 29 March 2022

Lungelo Gosa (born 31 January 1995) is a South African rugby union player, currently playing with the Border Bulldogs of the Currie Cup First Division for 2021 season. His regular position is fly-half or fullback.

== Rugby career ==
=== 2011–2013: Schoolboy rugby ===
Gosa was born in King William's Town in the Eastern Cape and attended the East London-based Selborne College. He played first team rugby for the school, also captaining the side in 2013. He was selected to represent his local provincial union, the Border Bulldogs twice at schoolboy level; he played for them at the Under-16 Grant Khomo Week in 2011, as well as at the Under-18 Craven Week tournament in 2013, where he scored a try against Namibia and kicked seven points against the Boland Cavaliers.

=== 2014–2016: Sevens / Golden Lions ===
After high school, Gosa concentrated on playing rugby sevens. He represented the South Africa Sevens Academy team at several international tournaments in 2014, 2015 and 2016 – and was also named in an extended training squad for the team as they prepared for the 2016 Summer Olympics – but failed to break into the national team.

Gosa also returned to the fifteen-man form of the sport towards the end of 2015, making two appearances for the Johannesburg-based Golden Lions's Under-21 team in the Under-21 Provincial Championship.

=== 2016: Eastern Province Kings ===
In August 2016, Gosa was contracted by the cash-strapped Eastern Province Kings for the 2016 Currie Cup Premier Division. He made his first class debut by coming on as a replacement in their match against the Boland Cavaliers, scoring his first senior points within ten minutes of his debut by converting a Johann Tromp try. After two more appearances off the bench against the Blue Bulls and Western Province, he made his first senior start as the fly-half in their midweek match against Griquas, kicking seven points in his side's 24–47 defeat. He started as a fullback in their defeat to the Sharks before reverting to the bench for their final two matches in a season that saw the EP Kings fail to win any of their matches to finish bottom of the log.

=== 2017: Leopards ===
Gosa moved to Potchefstroom to join the Leopards for the 2017 season.

== Other sports ==
In addition to rugby, Gosa also played hockey at high school level and represented Border at cricket at Under-19 level.
