= Frik Kirsten =

South African rugby union player

- Full name: Frederick Barend Christoffel Kirsten
- Born: 18 August 1988 (age 38) Sandton, South Africa
- Height: 1.93 m (6 ft 4 in)
- Weight: 120 kg (18 st 13 lb; 265 lb)
- School: Afrikaanse Hoër Seunskool
- University: University of Pretoria
- Notable relative: Jannes Kirsten (brother)

Rugby union career
- Position: Tighthead Prop
- Current team: Blue Bulls / Bulls
Youth career
- 2004–2008: Blue Bulls
Amateur team(s)
Years	Team	Apps	(Points)
2011	UP Tuks	1	(0)
Senior career
Years	Team	Apps	(Points)
2008–2013	Blue Bulls	47	(0)
2009–2014	Bulls	34	(0)
2008–2013	Total	81	(0)
- Correct as of 12 July 2014
International career
Years	Team	Apps	(Points)
2005	S.A. Schools B		
2006	S.A. Schools U18		
2007	South Africa Under-19		
2008	South Africa U20	5	(5)
- Correct as of 1 August 2013

Frederick Barend Christoffel Kirsten (born 18 August 1988) is a former South African rugby union professional footballer that played as a prop. He represented the Bulls in the international Super Rugby competition between 2009 and 2014 and the Blue Bulls in the domestic Currie Cup and Vodacom Cup competitions between 2008 and 2013, making 81 first class appearances for the Pretoria-based side.

After making his first class debut during the 2008 Vodacom Cup, he made his Super Rugby debut against the Blues in 2009 and his Currie Cup debut in 2009 against Western Province in the same year.

In 2013, he was called up to the South Africa squad following an injury to Frans Malherbe, but failed to make any appearances for the Springboks.

He announced his retirement in December 2014, aged 26, after suffering a neck injury in February of that year.
