= Jannie Stander =

South African rugby union player

- Full name: Jan Hendrik Stander
- Born: 21 April 1993 (age 33) Phalaborwa, South Africa
- Height: 1.98 m (6 ft 6 in)
- Weight: 115 kg (18 st 2 lb; 254 lb)
- School: Hoërskool Monument, Krugersdorp

Rugby union career
- Position: Lock
Youth career
- 2006–2010: Limpopo Blue Bulls
- 2011–2014: Golden Lions
Senior career
Years	Team	Apps	(Points)
2013–2014	Golden Lions XV	4	(0)
2015–2018	Pumas	42	(20)
- Correct as of 18 May 2018
International career
Years	Team	Apps	(Points)
2013	South Africa Under-20	0	(0)
- Correct as of 17 April 2015

Jan Hendrik Stander (born 21 April 1993) is a South African rugby union professional player who last played for the Pumas in the Currie Cup and in the Rugby Challenge. His regular position is lock.

== Career ==
=== Limpopo ===
Hailing from Phalaborwa, Stander was selected to represent Limpopo Blue Bulls at provincial level; he played for them at the 2006 Under-13 Craven Week, at the 2009 Under-16 Grant Khomo Week and (despite still being Under-17) at the premier high school rugby union competition in South Africa, the 2010 Under-18 Craven Week held in Welkom.

=== Golden Lions ===
However, he didn't complete his schooling in Limpopo. In 2011, he moved to Krugersdorp, where he attended Hoërskool Monument for his matric year. This made him eligible to play for the Golden Lions and he represented them at the 2011 Craven Week tournament in Kimberley.

Stander joined the Golden Lions academy in 2012 and featured in all thirteen of the Golden Lions U19 side's matches during the 2012 Under-19 Provincial Championship; he scored one try against Western Province U19 in an 18–27 defeat in Cape Town The Golden Lions U19s finished the season in second spot on the log to qualify for the title play-offs; Stander started the semi-final, with his side losing 14–24 to Western Province U19 in Stellenbosch.

Stander made his first class debut during the 2013 Vodacom Cup, starting their 22–27 defeat against the Falcons in Kempton Park. He also started against the Blue Bulls and played off the bench in their 19–30 defeat against the Griffons.

After his involvement with the South Africa Under-20 squad on their tour of Argentina and in the 2013 IRB Junior World Championship, he returned to South Africa to make nine appearances for the Golden Lions U21s in the 2013 Under-21 Provincial Championship. He scored one try in their 25–40 defeat to the Blue Bulls U21, but still managed to help his side qualify for the title play-offs by finishing fourth on the log. He missed out on the semi-final, where the Golden Lions lost 41–44 to Western Province after extra time.

Stander made a solitary appearance for the Golden Lions in the 2014 Vodacom Cup, playing off the bench in a 110–0 victory against his former side the Limpopo Blue Bulls in a match in Polokwane. He started twelve of the Golden Lions U21s' matches during the 2014 Under-21 Provincial Championship, with tries against Border U21 and Western Province U21 helping his side reach the semi-finals once again. Like 2013, however, they were eliminated at the semi-final stage, this time losing 19–23 to the Blue Bulls with Stander playing the whole 80 minutes.

=== Pumas ===
Stander joined Nelspruit-based outfit the Pumas for the 2015 season and made his debut for his new side in their opening match of the 2015 Vodacom Cup season, a 57–18 victory over the Griffons. The Pumas won the Vodacom Cup for the first time in 2015, beating Western Province 24–7 in the final. Stander made four appearances during the season.

=== South Africa Under-20 ===
In 2013, Stander was included in a South Africa Under-20 squad that toured Argentina as preparation for the 2013 IRB Junior World Championship. He was initially not selected in the final squad that participated at the tournament in France, but was later included following an injury to Jannes Kirsten. He was named on the bench for their third-place play-off match against New Zealand, but failed to take to the field in a 41–34 victory.
