= Jannes Kirsten =

South African rugby union player

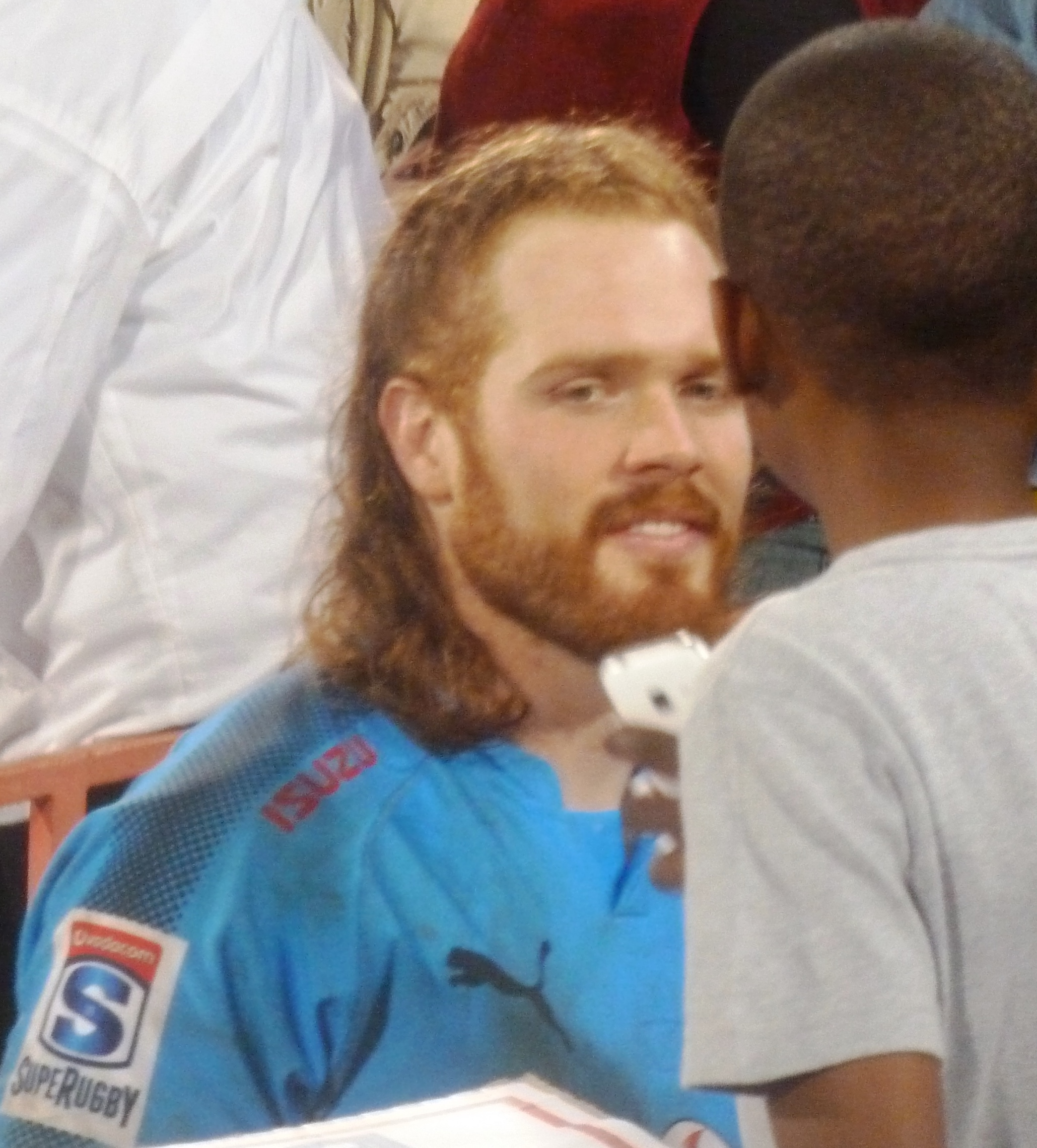
- Kirsten in 2017
- Full name: Johannes Casper Kirsten
- Born: 1 December 1993 (age 32) Johannesburg, South Africa
- Height: 1.97 m (6 ft 5 1/2 in)
- Weight: 111 kg (17 st 7 lb; 245 lb)
- School: Afrikaanse Hoër Seunskool, Pretoria
- University: University of Pretoria
- Notable relative: Frik Kirsten (brother)

Rugby union career
- Position: Lock / Flanker
- Current team: Bulls Rugby / United Rugby Championship
Youth career
- 2012–2014: Blue Bulls
Amateur team(s)
Years	Team	Apps	(Points)
2014–2015	UP Tuks	14	(10)
Senior career
Years	Team	Apps	(Points)
2013–2017	Blue Bulls	21	(10)
2016–present	Bulls	46	(10)
2017–2018	Blue Bulls XV	2	(0)
2018–2019	Toyota Verblitz	5	(0)
2019–Present	Exeter Chiefs	60	(25)
- Correct as of 2 February 2019
International career
Years	Team	Apps	(Points)
2013	South Africa Under-20	1	(0)
- Correct as of 13 August 2016

Johannes Casper Kirsten (born 1 December 1993) is a South African rugby union professional player for Bulls Rugby in The United Rugby Championship. His regular position is lock or flanker. Kirsten previously played for the Bulls in Super Rugby.

== Career ==
=== 2012–13 ===
Kirsten was never involved in provincial schools competitions like the annual Craven Week competition, but he joined the Blue Bulls Academy in Pretoria after finishing school. He made eight appearances for the Blue Bulls U19 side during the 2012 Under-19 Provincial Championship as they finished second on the log to qualify for the semi-finals. Two of Kirsten's appearances came in their 46–35 semi-final victory over the Sharks U19s and the final, which they lost 18–22 to Western Province U19.

Kirsten made his first class debut for the Blue Bulls during the 2013 Vodacom Cup. He made a single appearance for them in their 26–33 defeat to the Leopards XV during the round-robin stage of the competition, which saw the Blue Bulls reach the quarter final stage before being eliminated by the Eastern Province Kings.

In 2013, Kirsten was selected in the South Africa Under-20 team that attempted to retain the IRB Junior World Championship title that they won in 2012. Kirsten didn't feature in their opening match of the competition as they beat the United States 97–0. He was named on the bench for their next match against England, but failed to make an appearance in their 31–24 victory. He did, however, feature in their final pool match against hosts France, coming on as a replacement for the final ten minutes of a 26–19 victory which ensured South Africa finished top of their pool and qualified to the semi-finals. However, that proved to be Kirsten's only involvement in the tournament, as he sustained a fractured cheekbone during a training session, which ruled him out of the remainder of the tournament. In his absence, South Africa lost their semi-final match 17–18 to Wales before clinching third spot in the competition by beating New Zealand 41–34 to win their fourth third-place play-off match in six years.

Kirsten returned to domestic action with the Blue Bulls U21 side and made nine appearances for them during the 2013 Under-21 Provincial Championship. He missed out on the title play-off matches, though, as his side fell short once again, losing 23–30 to Western Province U21s in the final.

=== 2014– ===
In 2014, Kirsten represented Pretoria-based university side UP Tuks in the 2014 Varsity Cup, which ended in disappointment as they finished in sixth spot to miss out on the semi-finals. Having previously played as a lock, Kirsten started their match against UCT Ikey Tigers as a flanker and remained in this position for the Blue Bulls U21s in the 2014 Under-21 Provincial Championship. He started thirteen of their fourteen matches in the competition and got a hat-trick of tries in their match against Border U21 in a 143–0 victory on the opening day of the competition. The Blue Bulls reached the final of the competition and Kirsten finished on the winning team, as they ran out 20–10 winners over Western Province U21.

Kirsten started seven of UP Tuks's matches in the 2015 Varsity Cup, contributing tries in convincing victories over Maties and CUT Ixias as they topped the log after the round-robin stage to qualify for the semi-finals. Kirsten didn't play in the semi-final as UP Tuks lost the match 28–29 to NWU Pukke.

He was named in the Blue Bulls Currie Cup squad for the first time in 2015 and was named on the bench for their Round Three match against Western Province.

== Personal life ==
Kirsten is the younger brother of Frik Kirsten, a prop who made 81 appearances for the Bulls and Blue Bulls between 2008 and 2014 and was a member of the South Africa squad that toured Europe at the end of 2013. The brothers were both at the Blue Bulls between 2012 and 2014, but they didn't play together in the senior team at any stage before Frik's retirement in 2014 with a neck injury.

== Honours ==
- Currie Cup runner up 2016
- Premiership Rugby winner 2019-20
- Premiership Rugby runner up 2020-21
- European Rugby Champions Cup winner 2019-20
