= Franco Marais =

South African rugby union player

- Full name: Franco Stephan Marais
- Born: 23 September 1992 (age 34) Vereeniging
- Height: 1.86 m (6 ft 1 in)
- Weight: 108 kg (17 st 0 lb; 238 lb)

Rugby union career
- Position: Hooker
- Current team: Lions
Youth career
- 2010: Falcons
- 2011–2013: Sharks
Senior career
Years	Team	Apps	(Points)
2012–2017	Sharks (Currie Cup)	34	(20)
2013–2018	Sharks XV	20	(5)
2014–2018	Sharks	42	(0)
2018–2020	Gloucester	40	(5)
2020–2022	NTT DoCoMo Red Hurricanes	18	(10)
2022–2024	Urayasu D-Rocks	16	(50)
2024–2026	Golden Lions	5	(0)
2024–2026	Lions	25	(25)
- Correct as of 29 April 2026
International career
Years	Team	Apps	(Points)
2012	South Africa Under-20	1	(0)
2017	South Africa 'A'	2	(0)
- Correct as of 6 April 2018

Franco Stephan Marais (born 23 September 1992) is a South African rugby union player for Red Hurricanes in the Japanese Top League. His usual position is hooker.

In March 2018 it was announced that Marais would join Premiership Rugby side Gloucester for the 2018–19 season.

He will leave Gloucester at the end of 2019–20 season to join Japanese side Red Hurricanes. A side now under leadership of Gloucester's former head coach Johan Ackermann.
