= Danie Mienie =

South African rugby union player

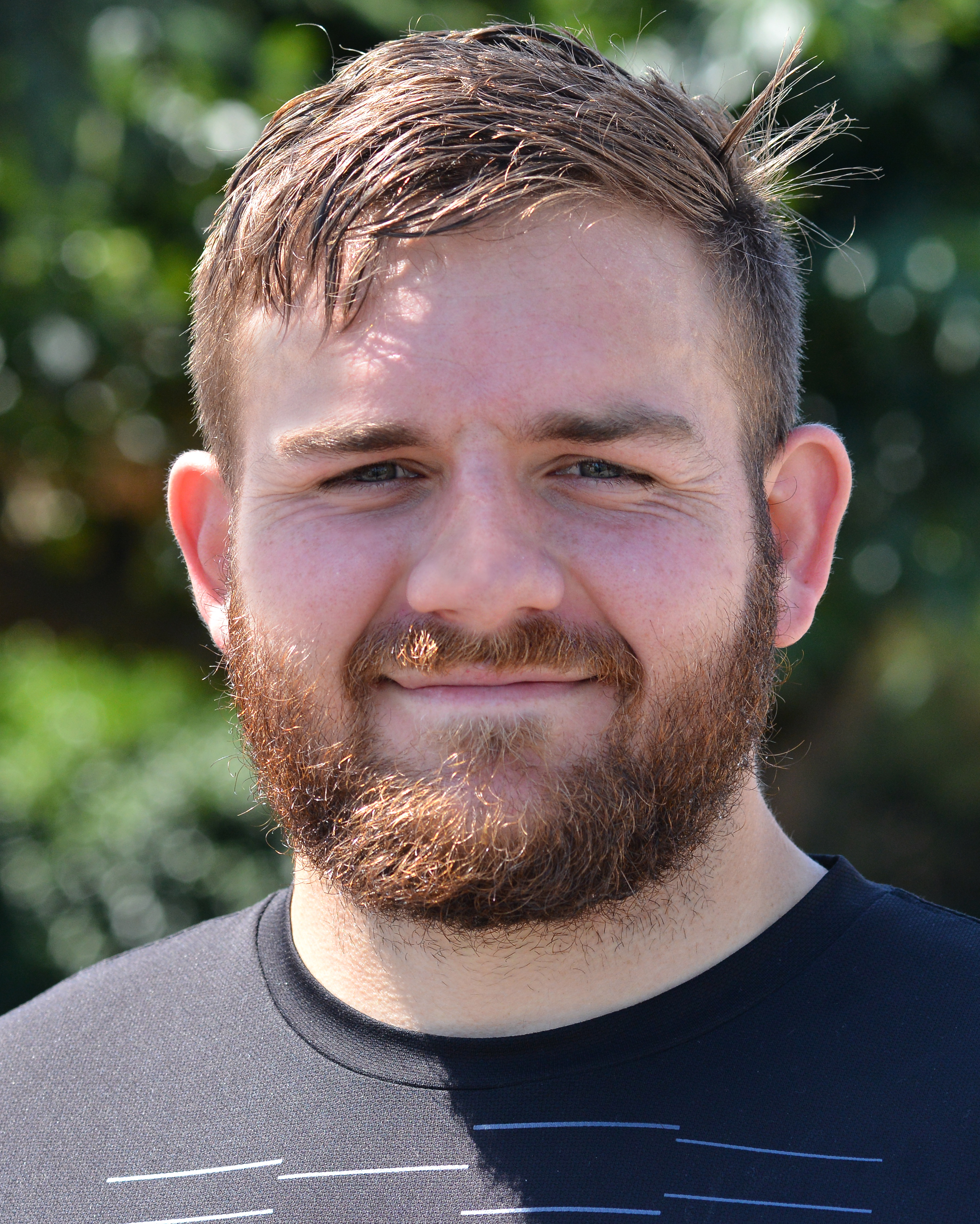
- Full name: Daniël Jacobus Mienie
- Born: 1 March 1991 (age 35) Polokwane, South Africa
- Height: 1.78 m (5 ft 10 in)
- Weight: 114 kg (17 st 13 lb; 251 lb)
- School: Merensky High School, Tzaneen

Rugby union career
- Position: Prop
- Current team: Rovigo
Youth career
- 2010–2012: Sharks
Senior career
Years	Team	Apps	(Points)
2012–2014	Sharks XV	15	(0)
2013–2014	Sharks (Currie Cup)	9	(0)
2013	Sharks	1	(0)
2015–2017	Cheetahs	19	(0)
2015	Griquas	12	(0)
2016–2017	Free State XV	2	(0)
2017–2018	Toulouse	15	(0)
2018	Golden Lions	4	(0)
2019	Golden Lions XV	4	(0)
2019–2020	Rovigo	4	(0)
- Correct as of 19 September 2019

Daniël Jacobus Mienie (born 1 March 1991) is a South African rugby union player for Rovigo in the Top12 in Italy. His regular position is prop.

== Career ==
He came through the Sharks youth system, playing for their Under–19 and Under–21 teams from 2010 to 2012.

He was included in the Sharks XV squad for the 2012 Vodacom Cup and made his senior debut against the Border Bulldogs and became a regular player for them in the Vodacom Cup competition over the next two seasons.

Despite having no Currie Cup experience, he was called up to the Sharks squad for the 2013 Super Rugby season following an injury to Tendai Mtawarira.

He joined Kimberley-based side Griquas on a one-year deal for the 2015 season.

He signed a contract to join Bloemfontein-based side Free State Cheetahs prior to the 2016 season on a two-year contract.

He joined Rovigo in the Top12 in Italy in September 2019 for 2019-2020 season.
