= Clemen Lewis =

South African rugby union player

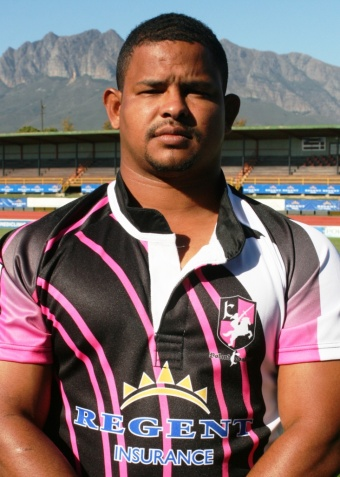
- Born: 10 October 1983 (age 43) Wellington, Western Cape
- Height: 1.73 m (5 ft 8 in)
- Weight: 95 kg (14 st 13 lb; 209 lb)
- School: Boland Agricultural

Rugby union career
- Position: Hooker
Youth career
- 2000, 2002: Western Province
- 2001: Boland Cavaliers
- 2003: Blue Bulls
Senior career
Years	Team	Apps	(Points)
2006–2018	Boland Cavaliers	171	(85)
2012	Stormers	0	(0)
- Correct as of 27 October 2018
International career
Years	Team	Apps	(Points)
2001	S.A. Schools		
2002	South Africa Under-19		
2012	South African Barbarians (South)	1	(0)
- Correct as of 21 June 2013

Clemen Lewis (born 10 October 1983) is a South African rugby union player who made a record 171 appearances for the Boland Cavaliers from 2006 to 2018. His regular position is hooker.

== Career ==
=== Youth ===
At youth level, Lewis played for Western Province at the 2000 Craven Week tournament and for Boland Cavaliers at the 2001 Craven Week tournament. This also led to his inclusion in the South African Schools team in 2001. He returned to Western Province to play for them at Under-19 level in 2002 and was subsequently called into the South African Under-19 squad in the same year.

In 2003, Lewis moved to Pretoria to join the Blue Bulls and played for them at Under-20 level. Despite his inclusion in their senior squad for the 2003 Vodacom Cup, he did not make a first class appearances.

=== Boland Cavaliers ===
Lewis returned to the Boland Cavaliers in 2005 and played for them in the Provincial Amateur competition. He was named in the squad for the 2005 Vodacom Cup competition without appearing. He finally made his senior debut in the 2006 Vodacom Cup, making a substitute appearance against his former team the Blue Bulls.

It wasn't until the 2007 Currie Cup Premier Division competition that he established himself in the first team. Five substitute appearances in that competition were followed up by four starts and he has been a first team regular ever since.

In 2012, Lewis was also included in the Stormers squad for the 2012 Super Rugby season, but he failed to make an appearance for them.

=== Representative rugby ===
In addition to his S.A. Schools and S.A.Under-19 representation, he was also included in a South African Barbarians (South) team that faced England during the 2012 mid-year rugby test series.
