= Joubert Horn =

South African rugby union player

- Full name: Joubert Prinsloo Horn
- Born: 8 October 1988 (age 38) Welkom, South Africa
- Height: 1.97 m (6 ft 5 1/2 in)
- Weight: 110 kg (17 st 5 lb; 243 lb)
- School: Grey College, Bloemfontein
- University: University of the Free State

Rugby union career
- Position: Lock
- Current team: Boland Cavaliers
Youth career
- 2006: Border
- 2009: Griquas
- 2009: Free State Cheetahs
Amateur team(s)
Years	Team	Apps	(Points)
2010–2012	UFS Shimlas	21	(10)
Senior career
Years	Team	Apps	(Points)
2010–2012	Griffons	30	(10)
2013	Griquas	5	(0)
2013	Viadana	12	(10)
2014	Free State XV	2	(0)
2014–2015	Soyaux Angoulême XV Charente	10	(0)
2015–2016	Bayonne	18	(5)
2016	Boland Cavaliers	8	(5)
2010–2016	Total	85	(30)
- Correct as of 9 October 2016

Joubert Prinsloo Horn (born 8 October 1988) is a former South African rugby union player whose usual playing position was lock. He played first class rugby between 2010 and 2016; he played for South African domestic teams the Griffons and Griquas before a spell with Italian side Viadana in 2013. After a short return to South Africa to play for the Free State XV, he moved to France, where he played for Soyaux Angoulême XV Charente and Bayonne. He returned to South Africa in 2016 to play for the Boland Cavaliers, before announcing his retirement at the end of the year.

== Rugby career ==
Horn represented the UFS Shimlas in the Varsity Cup between 2010 and 2012 and he also played Currie Cup First Division rugby for the Griffons during this time. He moved west to join Griquas ahead of the 2013 Vodacom Cup season making his debut against the Blue Bulls on 9 March 2013 and made five appearances, but was not retained for the 2013 Currie Cup Premier Division.

He then had a short spell at Italian side Viadana, making twelve appearances in the 2013–14 National Championship of Excellence and European Challenge Cup competitions, before returning to South Africa to play for the Free State XV in the 2014 Vodacom Cup competition.

However, his return to South Africa was short-lived and he moved to French Fédérale 1 side Soyaux Angoulême XV Charente prior to the 2014–2015 season.

In September 2015, he signed with Aviron Bayonnais for the 2015–2016 season, replacing Mark Chisholm. He will make his first appearance in Rugby Pro D2.
