= Piet van Zyl (rugby union, born 1989) =

South African rugby union player

- Full name: Petrus Erasmus van Zyl
- Born: 14 September 1989 (age 37) Pretoria, South Africa
- Height: 1.75 m (5 ft 9 in)
- Weight: 84 kg (13 st 3 lb; 185 lb)
- School: Grey College, Bloemfontein
- University: University of the Free State

Rugby union career
- Position: Scrum-half
- Current team: Stade Français Paris
Youth career
- 2008–2010: Free State Cheetahs
Senior career
Years	Team	Apps	(Points)
2010–2013	Free State Cheetahs	31	(30)
2011	Emerging Cheetahs	1	(0)
2012–2013	Cheetahs	32	(25)
2014–2017	Bulls	46	(45)
2014–2017	Blue Bulls	31	(40)
2018	London Irish	8	(25)
2018-2019	Stade Français Paris	25	(25)
- Correct as of 13 April 2018
International career
Years	Team	Apps	(Points)
2013–2016	South Africa	3	(0)
2016	South Africa 'A'	2	(5)
2016	Springbok XV	1	(0)
- Correct as of 13 April 2018

Petrus Erasmus van Zyl (born 14 September 1989) is a South African rugby union footballer who plays as a scrum-half for Stade Français Paris rugby.

== Career ==
Van Zyl was born in Pretoria, however he is a product of the famous Grey College school in Bloemfontein. He made his Free State Cheetahs debut in 2010 and his impressive domestic performances saw him promoted to the Cheetahs side for the 2012 Super Rugby season. To date he has played over 50 times in all competitions for the Cheetahs.

On 30 July 2013, the Blue Bulls announced that he would join them after the 2013 Currie Cup Premier Division season. He was included in the Bulls squad for the 2014 Super Rugby season and made his debut in a 31–16 defeat to the Sharks in Durban.

In October 2017, Van Zyl announced that he would retire from South African rugby to return to his family farm in Vrede, although he would consider an international move. In December, it was announced that he would join English side London Irish in 2018, which was confirmed by his new side on 4 January.

== International ==
Van Zyl earned his first international call up ahead of South Africa's second match in the 2013 mid-year rugby union tests, taking the place of the injured Jano Vermaak in the squad. He made his Springbok debut against Scotland on 15 June replacing Ruan Pienaar in the 69th minute of the match at the Mbombela Stadium in Nelspruit in a 30–17 win for the home side. He earned his second cap a week later in South Africa's 56–23 drubbing of Samoa.

In 2016, Van Zyl was included in a South Africa 'A' squad that played a two-match series against a touring England Saxons team. He came on as a replacement in their first match in Bloemfontein and scored a 64th-minute try for his side, but ended on the losing side as the visitors ran out 32–24 winners. He then started the second match of the series, a 26–29 defeat to the Saxons in George.
