= Rayno Benjamin =

South African rugby union player

- Full name: Rayno Shannon Benjamin
- Born: 3 August 1983 (age 43) Vredenburg, South Africa
- Height: 1.88 m (6 ft 2 in)
- Weight: 94 kg (207 lb; 14 st 11 lb)
- School: Weston High School

Rugby union career
- Position: Wing / Centre
- Current team: Boland Cavaliers
Senior career
Years	Team	Apps	(Points)
2004–2006	Boland Cavaliers	42	(175)
2006	Stormers	11	(10)
2007–2008	Golden Lions	23	(65)
2008	Lions XV	1	(5)
2008	Lions	12	(10)
2011–2017	Cheetahs	60	(75)
2011	Emerging Cheetahs	1	(5)
2011–2017	Free State Cheetahs	51	(90)
2016–2017	Free State XV	6	(10)
2018	Boland Cavaliers	4	(5)
2018–present	Shimizu Blue Sharks		
- Correct as of 13 July 2018
International career
Years	Team	Apps	(Points)
2005–2015	South Africa Sevens		
- Correct as of 22 April 2018
Medal record
Men's rugby sevens
Representing South Africa
Commonwealth Games
Bronze medal – third place	2010 Delhi	Team competition

Rayno Shannon Benjamin (born 3 August 1983) is a South African rugby union footballer who plays as a wing or centre for Japanese Top East League side Shimizu Blue Sharks.

== Career ==
He started out his career in the Western Cape with the Boland Cavaliers and his impressive performances saw him earn Super Rugby honours with the Stormers during the 2006 Super 14 season. He switched to Bloemfontein in 2007 for his first spell with the Cheetahs. However, he didn't manage any first team appearances and this saw him move on again to join the Lions in Johannesburg. He stayed there for 2 seasons before spending the next couple of years focusing on his rugby sevens career.

He returned to the 15 man game in 2011 and started his second spell with the Cheetahs which has seen him make more than 70 appearances in Currie Cup and Super Rugby matches.

== International ==
Benjamin has been a long-term member of the Blitzbokke squad and has played in 11 IRB Sevens World Series events between 2006 and 2009. In 2013, he was included in the squad for the 2013 Rugby World Cup Sevens
