= 2017 Currie Cup Premier Division =

Domestic rugby union competition

- Countries: South Africa
- Date: 21 July – 28 October 2017
- Champions: Western Province (34th title)
- Runners-up: Sharks
- Relegated: None
- Matches played: 43
- Tries scored: 369 (average 8.6 per match)
- Top point scorer: George Whitehead (96)
- Top try scorer: Warrick Gelant (10)

The 2017 Currie Cup Premier Division was the top tier of the 2017 Currie Cup competition, an annual South African rugby union competition organised by the South African Rugby Union. It was the 79th edition of the competition and was contested between 21 July and 28 October 2017.

The competition was won by Western Province, who beat the Sharks 33–21 in the final held in Durban. Griquas finished bottom of the log, but retained their Premier Division status by beating the Griffons in a relegation play-off.

== Competition rules and information ==
There were seven participating teams in the 2017 Currie Cup Premier Division. These seven teams played twice against each other over the course of the competition, once at home and once away. Teams received four points for a win and two points for a draw. Bonus points were awarded to teams that scored 4 or more tries in a game, as well as to teams that lost a match by 7 points or less. Teams were ranked by log points, then points difference (points scored less points conceded).

The top four teams qualified for the semi-finals, which was followed by a final.

== Teams ==
The teams that participated in the 2017 Currie Cup Premier Division were:

Location of teams in the 2017 Currie Cup Premier Division

2017 Currie Cup Premier Division teams
Team	Sponsored Name	Stadium/s	Sponsored Name
Blue Bulls	Vodacom Blue Bulls	Loftus Versfeld, Pretoria	Loftus Versfeld
Free State Cheetahs	Toyota Free State Cheetahs	Free State Stadium, Bloemfontein	Free State Stadium
Golden Lions	Xerox Golden Lions	Ellis Park Stadium, Johannesburg	Emirates Airline Park
Griquas	Tafel Lager Griquas	Griqua Park, Kimberley	Tafel Lager Park
Pumas	Steval Pumas	Mbombela Stadium, Mbombela	Mbombela Stadium
Sharks	Cell C Sharks	Kings Park Stadium, Durban	Growthpoint Kings Park
Western Province	DHL Western Province	Newlands Stadium, Cape Town	DHL Newlands

== Pool stage ==
=== Standings ===
The final log for the 2017 Currie Cup Premier Division was:

2017 Currie Cup Premier Division log
Pos	Team	Pld	W	D	L	PF	PA	PD	TF	TA	TB	LB	Pts	Qualification
1	Sharks	12	10	0	2	352	229	+123	49	29	7	0	47	Semi-finals
2	Western Province	12	7	0	5	410	308	+102	59	39	8	1	37	Semi-finals
3	Golden Lions	12	6	0	6	346	395	−49	48	53	9	2	35	Semi-finals
4	Blue Bulls	12	5	0	7	457	442	+15	63	62	9	3	32	Semi-finals
5	Free State Cheetahs	12	6	0	6	357	458	−101	48	63	6	1	31	
6	Pumas	12	4	0	8	348	371	−23	48	55	7	4	27	
7	Griquas	12	4	0	8	391	458	−67	48	62	6	4	26	Promotion/relegation play-off

Rules for classification: 4 points for a win; 2 points for a draw; 1 bonus point for a loss by seven points or less; 1 bonus point for scoring four or more tries in a match

=== Round-by-round ===
The table below shows a team's progression throughout the season. For each round, each team's cumulative points total is shown with the overall log position in brackets.

Team Progression – 2017 Currie Cup Premier Division
Team	R1	R2	R3	R4	R5	R6	R7	R8	R9	R10	R11	R12	R13	R14	SF	F
Sharks	0 (7th)	5 (4th)	10 (3rd)	15 (2nd)	20 (1st)	20 (2nd)	24 (2nd)	29 (1st)	34 (1st)	39 (1st)	43 (1st)	47 (1st)	47 (1st)	47 (1st)	Won	Lost
Western Province	0 (6th)	0 (7th)	5 (5th)	6 (6th)	11 (5th)	16 (3rd)	17 (3rd)	17 (4th)	22 (3rd)	22 (4th)	27 (3rd)	32 (2nd)	32 (2nd)	37 (2nd)	Won	Won
Golden Lions	2 (5th)	7 (2nd)	8 (4th)	8 (5th)	9 (6th)	9 (7th)	10 (7th)	15 (7th)	20 (4th)	25 (3rd)	25 (4th)	25 (4th)	30 (4th)	35 (3rd)	Lost	—N/a
Blue Bulls	5 (3rd)	5 (3rd)	10 (2nd)	10 (3rd)	11 (4th)	13 (5th)	13 (6th)	18 (3rd)	18 (6th)	20 (6th)	20 (6th)	22 (6th)	27 (5th)	32 (4th)	Lost	—N/a
Free State Cheetahs	5 (1st)	10 (1st)	10 (1st)	15 (1st)	16 (2nd)	21 (1st)	25 (1st)	25 (2nd)	25 (2nd)	25 (2nd)	30 (2nd)	30 (3rd)	31 (3rd)	31 (5th)	—N/a	—N/a
Pumas	5 (2nd)	5 (5th)	5 (6th)	6 (7th)	6 (7th)	10 (6th)	15 (4th)	17 (5th)	18 (5th)	22 (5th)	24 (5th)	24 (5th)	26 (6th)	27 (6th)	—N/a	—N/a
Griquas	2 (4th)	4 (6th)	4 (7th)	9 (4th)	13 (3rd)	14 (4th)	14 (5th)	16 (6th)	16 (7th)	16 (7th)	16 (7th)	21 (7th)	26 (7th)	26 (7th)	—N/a	—N/a
Key:	win	draw	loss	bye												

=== Matches ===
==== Round One ====
21 July 2017	Free State Cheetahs	47–12	Sharks	Free State Stadium, Bloemfontein
19:00	Try: Uzair Cassiem 12'; Francois Venter 29'; Reinach Venter 57'; Raymond Rhule 61'; William Small-Smith 69'; Zee Mkhabela 80'; Con: Niel Marais 14', 30', 71'; Clayton Blommetjies 81'; Pen: Niel Marais 8', 48', 53'; Cards: Uzair Cassiem (yellow card) 33' to 43'	Scoreboard	Try: S'bura Sithole 20'; Bandisa Ndlovu 73'; Con: Benhard Janse van Rensburg 21'	Referee: Cwengile Jadezweni

22 July 2017	Griquas	45–51	Blue Bulls	Griqua Park, Kimberley
19:30	Try: Ederies Arendse 13'; Enver Brandt 21', 67'; Christiaan Meyer 44'; Jono Janse van Rensburg 64'; Con: André Swarts 15', 21'; George Whitehead 64', 68'; Pen: André Swarts 20', 23', 43', 52'	Scoreboard Report	Try: Abongile Nonkontwana 7'; Piet van Zyl 17'; Jaco Visagie 33'; Duncan Matthews 38'; Warrick Gelant 58'; André Warner 60'; Travis Ismaiel 71'; Con: Tinus de Beer 18', 34', 39'; Joshua Stander 61', 72'; Pen: Tinus de Beer 49'; Warrick Gelant 53'	Referee: AJ Jacobs

23 July 2017	Pumas	43–36	Golden Lions	Mbombela Stadium, Mbombela
14:30	Try: Gerrit Smith 7', 67'; Nardus van der Walt 19'; Francois Kleinhans 33'; Justin van Staden 54'; Hennie Skorbinski 64'; Con: Justin van Staden 7', 20', 34', 55', 65'; Pen: Justin van Staden 3'	Scoreboard	Try: Stokkies Hanekom 5'; Shaun Reynolds 14'; Bradley Thain 41'; Aphiwe Dyantyi 56'; Ashlon Davids 60'; Con: Shaun Reynolds 6', 15', 42', 60'; Pen: Shaun Reynolds 12'	Referee: Stuart Berry

Bye/s: Western Province

==== Round Two ====
29 July 2017	Golden Lions	48–43	Griquas	Ellis Park Stadium, Johannesburg
12:00	Try: Pieter Jansen 3'; Jacques Nel 11'; Jarryd Sage 24'; Aphiwe Dyantyi 27'; Jaco van der Walt 40'; Madosh Tambwe 47', 50'; Con: Shaun Reynolds 11', 25', 28', 40', 50'; Pen: Shaun Reynolds 80'	Scoreboard	Try: Christiaan Meyer 6', 20'; George Whitehead 36'; Ederies Arendse 55'; Enver Brandt 60'; Renier Botha 75'; Con: George Whitehead 7', 21', 37', 60', 75'; Pen: George Whitehead 32'	Referee: Cwengile Jadezweni

29 July 2017	Sharks	29–0	Pumas	Kings Park Stadium, Durban
17:00	Try: Lukhanyo Am 43'; S'busiso Nkosi 48'; Kobus van Wyk 58'; Jeremy Ward 67'; Con: Curwin Bosch 44', 50', 68'; Pen: Curwin Bosch 5'	Scoreboard		Referee: Quinton Immelman

30 July 2017	Free State Cheetahs	30–17	Western Province	Free State Stadium, Bloemfontein
14:30	Try: Rosko Specman 2'; William Small-Smith 40'; Francois Venter 44'; Makazole Mapimpi 51'; Con: Niel Marais 40', 45'; Pen: Niel Marais 17', 24'; Cards: Oupa Mohojé (yellow card) 32' to 42'	Scoreboard	Try: Justin Phillips 36'; Stephan de Wit 72'; Con: Kurt Coleman 36'; Brandon Thomson 73'; Pen: Kurt Coleman 6'	Referee: AJ Jacobs

Bye/s: Blue Bulls

==== Round Three ====
4 August 2017	Sharks	41–3	Griquas	Kings Park Stadium, Durban
19:00		Scoreboard

5 August 2017	Western Province	34–19	Pumas	Newlands Stadium, Cape Town
13:00		Scoreboard

5 August 2017	Blue Bulls	54–22	Golden Lions	Loftus Versfeld, Pretoria
19:00		Scoreboard

Bye/s: Free State Cheetahs

==== Round Four ====
9 August 2017	Griquas	44–34	Western Province	Griqua Park, Kimberley
13:00		Scoreboard

9 August 2017	Pumas	34–45	Free State Cheetahs	Mbombela Stadium, Mbombela
15:15		Scoreboard

9 August 2017	Blue Bulls	20–28	Sharks	Loftus Versfeld, Pretoria
17:30		Scoreboard Report

Bye/s: Golden Lions

==== Round Five ====
12 August 2017	Free State Cheetahs	25–30	Griquas	Free State Stadium, Bloemfontein
15:00		Scoreboard

12 August 2017	Western Province	45–34	Blue Bulls	Newlands Stadium, Cape Town
15:15		Scoreboard

12 August 2017	Golden Lions	31–47	Sharks	Ellis Park Stadium, Johannesburg
19:30		Scoreboard

Bye/s: Pumas

==== Round Six ====
18 August 2017	Western Province	39–3	Golden Lions	Newlands Stadium, Cape Town
19:00		Scoreboard

19 August 2017	Blue Bulls	40–41	Free State Cheetahs	Loftus Versfeld, Pretoria
14:05		Scoreboard Report

20 August 2017	Griquas	21–27	Pumas	Griqua Park, Kimberley
14:30		Scoreboard

Bye/s: Sharks

==== Round Seven ====
25 August 2017	Pumas	51–15	Blue Bulls	Mbombela Stadium, Mbombela
19:00		Scoreboard

26 August 2017	Western Province	20–21	Sharks	Newlands Stadium, Cape Town
15:00		Scoreboard

26 August 2017	Free State Cheetahs	30–24	Golden Lions	Free State Stadium, Bloemfontein
17:15		Scoreboard

Bye/s: Griquas

==== Round Eight ====
1 September 2017	Blue Bulls	44–42	Griquas	Loftus Versfeld, Pretoria
18:15		Scoreboard Report

2 September 2017	Golden Lions	29–28	Pumas	Ellis Park Stadium, Johannesburg
14:00		Scoreboard

2 September 2017	Sharks	45–15	Free State Cheetahs	Kings Park Stadium, Durban
16:15		Scoreboard

Bye/s: Western Province

==== Round Nine ====
8 September 2017	Pumas	25–27	Sharks	Mbombela Stadium, Mbombela
17:00		Scoreboard

8 September 2017	Griquas	17–34	Golden Lions	Griqua Park, Kimberley
19:00		Scoreboard

9 September 2017	Western Province	57–14	Free State Cheetahs	Newlands Stadium, Cape Town
15:00		Scoreboard

Bye/s: Blue Bulls

==== Round Ten ====
15 September 2017	Griquas	22–40	Sharks	Griqua Park, Kimberley
17:00		Scoreboard

15 September 2017	Pumas	22–12	Western Province	Mbombela Stadium, Mbombela
19:15		Scoreboard

16 September 2017	Golden Lions	36–33	Blue Bulls	Ellis Park Stadium, Johannesburg
17:15		Scoreboard Report

Bye/s: Free State Cheetahs

==== Round Eleven ====
22 September 2017	Free State Cheetahs	33–32	Pumas	Free State Stadium, Bloemfontein
15:00		Scoreboard

23 September 2017	Sharks	18–5	Blue Bulls	Kings Park Stadium, Durban
15:00		Scoreboard Report

23 September 2017	Western Province	55–27	Griquas	Newlands Stadium, Cape Town
17:15		Scoreboard

Bye/s: Golden Lions

==== Round Twelve ====
29 September 2017	Sharks	24–10	Golden Lions	Kings Park Stadium, Durban
19:00		Scoreboard

30 September 2017	Griquas	59–24	Free State Cheetahs	Griqua Park, Kimberley
14:00		Scoreboard

1 October 2017	Blue Bulls	45–46	Western Province	Loftus Versfeld, Pretoria
14:30		Scoreboard Report

Bye/s: Pumas

==== Round Thirteen ====
6 October 2017	Free State Cheetahs	36–64	Blue Bulls	Free State Stadium, Bloemfontein
19:00		Scoreboard Report

7 October 2017	Pumas	35–38	Griquas	Mbombela Stadium, Mbombela
14:00		Scoreboard

8 October 2017	Golden Lions	29–20	Western Province	Ellis Park Stadium, Johannesburg
14:30		Scoreboard

Bye/s: Sharks

==== Round Fourteen ====
13 October 2017	Blue Bulls	52–32	Pumas	Loftus Versfeld, Pretoria
19:00		Scoreboard Report

14 October 2017	Sharks	20–31	Western Province	Kings Park Stadium, Durban
15:00		Scoreboard

14 October 2017	Golden Lions	44–17	Free State Cheetahs	Ellis Park Stadium, Johannesburg
17:15		Scoreboard

Bye/s: Griquas

== Play-offs ==
=== Title play-offs ===
==== Semifinals ====
21 October 2017	Sharks	37–27	Blue Bulls	Kings Park Stadium, Durban
14:30	Try: Lukhanyo Am, Kobus van Wyk, Louis Schreuder, Ruan Botha; Con: Curwin Bosch (4); Pen: Curwin Bosch (2); Drop: Curwin Bosch (1)	Scoreboard Report	Try: Pierre Schoeman, Ivan van Zyl, Burger Odendaal; Con: Marnitz Boshoff (3); Pen: Marnitz Boshoff (2)

21 October 2017	Western Province	19–5	Golden Lions	Newlands Stadium, Cape Town
17:00		Scoreboard

==== Final ====
28 October 2017	Sharks	21–33	Western Province	Kings Park Stadium, Durban
17:00		Scoreboard		Attendance: 32 562

=== Relegation play-off ===
27 October 2017	Griquas	59–26	Griffons	Griqua Park, Kimberley
18:30		Scoreboard

- Griquas remain in the Currie Cup Premier Division for 2018.
- Griffons remain in the Currie Cup First Division for 2018.

== Honours ==
The honour roll for the 2017 Currie Cup Premier Division was as follows:

2017 Currie Cup Premier Division
Champions:	Western Province (34th title)
Top points scorer:	George Whitehead, Griquas (96)
Top try scorer:	Warrick Gelant, Blue Bulls (10)

== Players ==
=== Squads ===
The following squads were named for the 2017 Currie Cup Premier Division:

Blue Bulls squad
Forwards	Shaun Adendorff • Tim Agaba • Matthys Basson • Jan-Henning Campher • Clyde Davids • Nick de Jager • Aston Fortuin • Lizo Gqoboka • Johan Grobbelaar • Irné Herbst • John-Roy Jenkinson • Jannes Kirsten • Edgar Marutlulle • Freddy Ngoza • Abongile Nonkontwana • Boom Prinsloo • Pierre Schoeman • Dayan van der Westhuizen • Ruben van Heerden • Marco van Staden • Conraad van Vuuren • Jano Venter • Jaco Visagie • Did not play: • Jacobie Adriaanse • Martin Dreyer • Neethling Fouché • Njabulo Gumede • Roelof Smit • Eli Snyman • Ruan Steenkamp
Backs	Ulrich Beyers • Marnitz Boshoff • Tinus de Beer • Stedman Gans • Warrick Gelant • Travis Ismaiel • JT Jackson • Tony Jantjies • Johnny Kôtze • Manie Libbok • Kefentse Mahlo • Duncan Matthews • Rabz Maxwane • Franco Naudé • Burger Odendaal • Handré Pollard • Divan Rossouw • Joshua Stander • Dries Swanepoel • Jamba Ulengo • Ivan van Zyl • Piet van Zyl • André Warner • Did not play: • Theo Maree • Rudy Paige • Jade Stighling
Coach	Nollis Marais • John Mitchell

Free State Cheetahs squad
Forwards	Justin Basson • Rynier Bernardo • Tom Botha • Uzair Cassiem • Aranos Coetzee • Luan de Bruin • Erich de Jager • Chris Dry • Jacques du Toit • Joseph Dweba • Elandré Huggett • Reniel Hugo • Nicolaas Immelman • Günther Janse van Vuuren • Jeremy Jordaan • Niell Jordaan • Armandt Koster • Johan Kotze • Andrew Kuhn • Daniel Maartens • Charles Marais • Oupa Mohojé • Ox Nché • Gerhard Olivier • Junior Pokomela • Sibabalo Qoma • Paul Schoeman • Marnus van der Merwe • Torsten van Jaarsveld • Henco Venter • Reinach Venter • Ntokozo Vidima • Dennis Visser • Carl Wegner • Jasper Wiese • Did not play: • Tienie Burger • Hilton Lobberts • Steven Meiring • Fiffy Rampeta
Backs	Cecil Afrika • Dian Badenhorst • Rayno Benjamin • Clayton Blommetjies • Carel-Jan Coetzee • Ryno Eksteen • Reinhardt Erwee • Lloyd Greeff • Malcolm Jaer • Stephan Janse van Rensburg • JW Jonker • Nico Lee • Makazole Mapimpi • Vuyani Maqina • Niel Marais • Marco Mason • Tian Meyer • Ali Mgijima • Zee Mkhabela • Luther Obi • Sergeal Petersen • Robbie Petzer • Raymond Rhule • William Small-Smith • JP Smith • Rosko Specman • Ernst Stapelberg • Francois Venter • Shaun Venter • Did not play: • Ruan van Rensburg • Lihleli Xoli
Coach	Rory Duncan • Daan Human

Golden Lions squad
Forwards	Justin Ackerman • Jacobie Adriaanse • Andrew Beerwinkel • Fabian Booysen • Cyle Brink • Robbie Coetzee • Hacjivah Dayimani • Jo-Hanko de Villiers • Bobby de Wee • Ruan Dreyer • Nico du Plessis • Andries Ferreira • Corné Fourie • Rhyno Herbst • Pieter Jansen • Johannes Jonker • Ryan Kankowski • Robert Kruger • Malcolm Marx • Len Massyn • Marvin Orie • Sti Sithole • Dylan Smith • Kwagga Smith • Jacques van Rooyen • James Venter • Jano Venter • Mike Willemse • Did not play: • Le Roux Baard • Driaan Bester • Ruan Brits • JP du Preez • Lourens Erasmus • Chergin Fillies • Wiehan Jacobs • Morné Moos • Franco Mostert • Luvuyo Pupuma • Pieter Scholtz • Victor Sekekete • Bhekisa Shongwe • Koos Tredoux • Akker van der Merwe • HP van Schoor • Hencus van Wyk • Jaco Willemse
Backs	Andries Coetzee • Ross Cronjé • Ashlon Davids • Branco du Preez • Aphiwe Dyantyi • Stokkies Hanekom • Jack Hart • Rohan Janse van Rensburg • Marco Jansen van Vuren • Jan-Louis la Grange • Sylvian Mahuza • Siya Masuku • Jacques Nel • Manuel Rass • Shaun Reynolds • Jarryd Sage • Courtnall Skosan • Dillon Smit • Madosh Tambwe • Bradley Thain • Morné van den Berg • Jaco van der Walt • Anthony Volmink • Harold Vorster • Did not play: • Ruan Combrinck • Xander Crause • Faf de Klerk • Eddie Fouché • Selom Gavor • Dean Gordon • Gerrie Labuschagné • Barend Smit • Wayne van der Bank • Gerdus van der Walt • Heimar Williams
Coach	Swys de Bruin

Griquas squad
Forwards	Jonathan Adendorf • Wilmar Arnoldi • Marius Fourie • Liam Hendricks • Jono Janse van Rensburg • Pieter Jansen van Vuren • Kevin Kaba • Sias Koen • Stephan Kotzé • De Wet Kruger • AJ le Roux • RJ Liebenberg • Sintu Manjezi • Devon Martinus • Shaun McDonald • NJ Oosthuizen • FP Pelser • Conway Pretorius • Wandile Putuma • Louwrens Strydom • Ewald van der Westhuizen • Wendal Wehr • Mzwanele Zito • Did not play: • Mthunzi Moloi • Devon Nash • Steph Vermeulen
Backs	Ederies Arendse • Christopher Bosch • Renier Botha • Enver Brandt • AJ Coertzen • Tiaan Dorfling • Johnathan Francke • Tertius Kruger • Koch Marx • Christiaan Meyer • Kyle Steyn • André Swarts • Clinton Swart • Rudi van Rooyen • George Whitehead • Eric Zana • Did not play: • Alshaun Bock • Alvin Brandt
Coach	Peter Engledow

Pumas squad
Forwards	Louis Albertse • Thembelani Bholi • Chris Cloete • Marné Coetzee • Willie Engelbrecht • Carel Greeff • Stephan Greeff • Lambert Groenewald • Frank Herne • Marko Janse van Rensburg • Jeremy Jordaan • Francois Kleinhans • Hugo Kloppers • Jacques Kotzé • Cameron Lindsay • Hilton Lobberts • Khwezi Mona • Mark Pretorius • Pieter Scholtz • Brian Shabangu • Jannie Stander • De-Jay Terblanche • Nardus van der Walt • Stefan Willemse • Did not play: • Tazz Fuzani • Johann Grundlingh • Wiehan Hay • Reuben Johannes • Luxolo Koza • Ruaan Lerm • Morgan Naudé • Dylan Peterson • Marnus Schoeman • Simon Westraadt
Backs	Sias Ebersohn • Selom Gavor • Ruwellyn Isbell • Gerrie Labuschagné • JP Lewis • Kobus Marais • Theo Maree • Neil Maritz • Ryan Nell • Trompie Pretorius • Hennie Skorbinski • Gerrit Smith • Stefan Ungerer • Reynier van Rooyen • Justin van Staden • Devon Williams • Did not play: • Bernado Botha • Tyler Fisher • Deon Helberg • Hoffmann Maritz • Emile Temperman • Marlou van Niekerk • Leighton van Wyk
Coach	Brent Janse van Rensburg

Sharks squad
Forwards	Hyron Andrews • Ruan Botha • Keegan Daniel • Jean Droste • Andrew du Plessis • Dan du Preez • Jean-Luc du Preez • Thomas du Toit • Ross Geldenhuys • Thierry Kounga Kuaté • Khaya Majola • Mzamo Majola • Franco Marais • John-Hubert Meyer • Tera Mtembu • Bandisa Ndlovu • Tyler Paul • Chiliboy Ralepelle • Juan Schoeman • Akker van der Merwe • Kerron van Vuuren • Jacques Vermeulen • Wian Vosloo • Did not play: • Stephan Coetzee • Gideon Koegelenberg • Tendai Mtawarira • Coenie Oosthuizen • Rikus Zwarts
Backs	Tythan Adams • Lukhanyo Am • Garth April • Brandon Bailing • Tristan Blewett • Curwin Bosch • Michael Claassens • Benhard Janse van Rensburg • Marius Louw • Ilunga Mukendi • Odwa Ndungane • S'busiso Nkosi • Inny Radebe • Louis Schreuder • S'bura Sithole • Rhyno Smith • Kobus van Wyk • Hanco Venter • Jeremy Ward • Courtney Winnaar • Cameron Wright • Did not play: • Rowan Gouws • Patrick Lambie
Coach	Robert du Preez

Western Province squad
Forwards	Nizaam Carr • Jaco Coetzee • Jan de Klerk • Ruben de Villiers • Stephan de Wit • Johan du Toit • JC Janse van Rensburg • Michael Kumbirai • Wilco Louw • Bongi Mbonambi • Dean Muir • Sikhumbuzo Notshe • Scarra Ntubeni • Caylib Oosthuizen • Ramone Samuels • JD Schickerling • Chad Solomon • Piet-Louw Strauss • Kobus van Dyk • Jurie van Vuuren • Frans van Wyk • Chris van Zyl • Alistair Vermaak • Cobus Wiese • Eduard Zandberg • Did not play: • Juarno Augustus • Eital Bredenkamp • Pieter-Steph du Toit • Rynhardt Elstadt • Eben Etzebeth • Oli Kebble • Steven Kitshoff • Siya Kolisi • Frans Malherbe • Ayyoob Moerat • Carlü Sadie • Luke Stringer • Nyasha Tarusenga
Backs	Craig Barry • Bjorn Basson • Kurt Coleman • Damian de Allende • Robert du Preez • Dewaldt Duvenage • Michal Haznar • Huw Jones • Werner Kok • Dan Kriel • Dillyn Leyds • SP Marais • Godlen Masimla • Ruhan Nel • Justin Phillips • Seabelo Senatla • Brandon Thomson • Jano Vermaak • EW Viljoen • Damian Willemse • Did not play: • Juan de Jongh • Daniël du Plessis • Grant Hermanus • Khanyo Ngcukana • Ryan Oosthuizen • Ernst Stapelberg • Edwill van der Merwe • Leolin Zas
Coach	John Dobson
