= 2018 Currie Cup Premier Division =

Domestic rugby union competition

- Countries: South Africa
- Date: 17 August – 27 October 2018
- Champions: Sharks (8th title)
- Runners-up: Western Province
- Matches played: 24
- Tries scored: 200 (average 8.3 per match)
- Top point scorer: SP Marais (Western Province, 130)
- Top try scorer: Sergeal Petersen (Western Province, 8)

The 2018 Currie Cup Premier Division was the top tier of the 2018 Currie Cup, the 80th edition of the annual South African rugby union competition organised by the South African Rugby Union. It was played between 17 August and 27 October 2018 and featured the same seven teams as in 2017.

The competition was won by the Sharks, who beat Western Province 17–12 in the final played on 27 October 2018.

== Competition rules and information ==
There were seven participating teams in the 2018 Currie Cup Premier Division. They played each other once during the pool stage, either at home or away. Teams received four points for a win and two points for a draw. Bonus points were awarded to teams that scored four or more tries in a game, as well as to teams that lost a match by seven points or less. Teams were ranked by log points, then points difference (points scored less points conceded).

The top four teams in the pool stage qualified for the semifinals, which were followed by a final.

== Teams ==
The teams that played in the 2018 Currie Cup Premier Division are:

Location of teams in the 2018 Currie Cup Premier Division

2018 Currie Cup Premier Division teams
Team	Sponsored Name	Stadium/s	Sponsored Name
Blue Bulls	Vodacom Blue Bulls	Loftus Versfeld, Pretoria	Loftus Versfeld
Free State Cheetahs	Toyota Free State Cheetahs	Free State Stadium, Bloemfontein	Toyota Stadium
Golden Lions	Xerox Golden Lions	Ellis Park Stadium, Johannesburg	Emirates Airline Park
Griquas	Tafel Lager Griquas	Griqua Park, Kimberley	Tafel Lager Park
Pumas	iCollege Pumas	Mbombela Stadium, Mbombela	Mbombela Stadium
Sharks	Cell C Sharks	Kings Park Stadium, Durban	Jonsson Kings Park
Western Province	DHL Western Province	Newlands Stadium, Cape Town	DHL Newlands

== Pool stage ==
=== Standings ===
The final log for the 2018 Currie Cup Premier Division was:

2018 Currie Cup Premier Division log
Pos	Team	Pld	W	D	L	PF	PA	PD	TF	TA	TB	LB	Pts	Qualification
1	Western Province	6	6	0	0	276	113	+163	38	16	6	0	30	Semifinals
2	Sharks	6	5	0	1	193	133	+60	28	18	6	0	26	Semifinals
3	Golden Lions	6	4	0	2	239	213	+26	34	28	5	0	21	Semifinals
4	Blue Bulls	6	3	0	3	170	179	−9	24	25	4	1	17	Semifinals
5	Pumas	6	2	0	4	174	190	−16	24	28	4	0	12	
6	Griquas	6	1	0	5	175	252	−77	24	37	3	1	8	
7	Free State Cheetahs	6	0	0	6	93	240	−147	13	33	1	1	2	Relegation play-off

Rules for classification: 4 points for a win; 2 points for a draw; 1 bonus point for a loss by seven points or less; 1 bonus point for scoring four or more tries in a match

=== Round-by-round ===
The table below shows a team's progression throughout the season. For each round, each team's cumulative points total is shown with the overall log position in brackets.

Team Progression – 2018 Currie Cup Premier Division
Team	R1	R2	R3	R4	R5	R6	R7	R8	SF	F
Western Province	0 (3rd)	5 (1st)	10 (1st)	10 (4th)	15 (3rd)	20 (1st)	25 (1st)	30 (1st)	Won	Lost
Sharks	0 (3rd)	5 (4th)	10 (3rd)	15 (2nd)	15 (4th)	20 (2nd)	21 (2nd)	26 (2nd)	Won	Won
Golden Lions	0 (3rd)	5 (3rd)	10 (2nd)	15 (1st)	16 (2nd)	16 (4th)	16 (4th)	21 (3rd)	Lost	—N/a
Blue Bulls	5 (2nd)	5 (5th)	7 (4th)	12 (3rd)	17 (1st)	17 (3rd)	17 (3rd)	17 (4th)	Lost	—N/a
Pumas	5 (1st)	5 (2nd)	6 (5th)	6 (5th)	7 (6th)	12 (5th)	12 (5th)	12 (5th)	—N/a	—N/a
Griquas	0 (7th)	1 (6th)	1 (7th)	3 (6th)	8 (5th)	8 (6th)	8 (6th)	8 (6th)	—N/a	—N/a
Free State Cheetahs	0 (6th)	0 (7th)	2 (6th)	2 (7th)	2 (7th)	2 (7th)	2 (7th)	2 (7th)	—N/a	—N/a
Key:	win	draw	loss	bye						

=== Matches ===
The following matches were played in the 2018 Currie Cup Premier Division:

==== Round One ====
The 2018 Currie Cup kicked off with a match between the two teams that finished in the bottom two spots in 2017; the Pumas and Griquas in Nelspruit. The Pumas won the match 42–19, with fly-half Chris Smith having a Currie Cup debut to remember, scoring 22 points in his side's victory. In the other match, the Blue Bulls beat the Free State Cheetahs 34–12 in Bloemfontein, with their fly-half Manie Libbok scoring 17 points, including his team's opening try.

17 August 2018	Pumas	42–19	Griquas	Mbombela Stadium, Mbombela
17:00	Try: Hennie Skorbinski 27'; Stefan Ungerer 41'; Chris Smith 55'; Neil Maritz 57'; Marnus Schoeman 61'; Con: Chris Smith 28', 42', 56', 62'; Pen: Chris Smith 9', 21', 47'	Scoreboard	Try: AJ Coertzen 31'; Christiaan Meyer 69'; Conway Pretorius 71'; Con: George Whitehead 31', 72'; Cards: Liam Hendricks (yellow card) 60'	Referee: Rasta Rasivhenge

17 August 2018	Free State Cheetahs	12–34	Blue Bulls	Free State Stadium, Bloemfontein
19:00	Try: Joseph Dweba 2'; Shaun Venter 42'; Con: Tian Schoeman 3'; Cards: Ox Nché (yellow card) 15' to 25'; Justin Basson (yellow card) 54' to 64'	Scoreboard Report	Try: Manie Libbok 13' penalty try 54'; Jade Stighling 60'; Divan Rossouw 79'; Con: Manie Libbok 13', 61', 80'; Pen: Manie Libbok 50', 66'	Referee: Dan Jones

Bye/s: Golden Lions, Sharks, Western Province

==== Round Two ====
The three teams that has byes in Round One all secured home victories in Round Two. Defending champions Western Province got their title defense underway with a 32–0 victory over the Free State Cheetahs, while the Sharks beat the Blue Bulls 26–10 in Durban; both teams scored four tries in their victories to secure a bonus point. The highest-scoring match of the round was the Friday evening match between the Golden Lions and Griquas, with the team from Johannesburg winning 62–41. Winger Courtnall Skosan scored a hat-trick and Hacjivah Dayimani got a brace as the Golden Lions ran in nine tries, with fly-half Shaun Reynolds kicking 17 points. Griquas fly-half George Whitehead scored 16 points for the losing team, who scored five tries of their own.

24 August 2018	Golden Lions	62–41	Griquas	Ellis Park Stadium, Johannesburg
19:00	Try: Hacjivah Dayimani 5', 71'; Ross Cronjé 23'; Courtnall Skosan 29', 58', 77'; Sylvian Mahuza 44'; Len Massyn 47'; Wandisile Simelane 66'; Con: Shaun Reynolds 7', 24', 44', 48', 60', 68', 79'; Pen: Shaun Reynolds 43'	Scoreboard	Try: André Swarts 14'; Khwezi Mkhafu 31'; Wilmar Arnoldi 63'; Kyle Steyn 69'; AJ Coertzen 75'; Con: George Whitehead 14', 32', 64', 69', 75'; Pen: George Whitehead 1', 36'; Cards: Wendal Wehr (yellow card) 40' to 50'	Referee: Egon Seconds

25 August 2018	Sharks	26–10	Blue Bulls	Kings Park Stadium, Durban
15:00	Try: Juan Schoeman 5'; Curwin Bosch 21'; Kobus van Wyk 37'; Aphelele Fassi 63'; Con: Robert du Preez 6', 23', 39'	Scoreboard Report	Try: Jesse Kriel 15'; Con: Manie Libbok 16'; Pen: Manie Libbok 10'	Referee: Marius van der Westhuizen

25 August 2018	Western Province	32–0	Free State Cheetahs	Newlands Stadium, Cape Town
17:15	Try: Ruhan Nel 40'; Juarno Augustus 46'; Scarra Ntubeni 52'; JD Schickerling 60'; Con: SP Marais 40', 47', 61'; Pen: SP Marais 8', 21'; Cards: Juarno Augustus (yellow card) 4' to 15'	Scoreboard		Referee: AJ Jacobs

Bye/s: Pumas

==== Round Three ====
Round Three saw the Golden Lions, Sharks and Western Province all winning their away games to make it two wins out of two. Western Province remain top on points differential after a 57–28 victory over the Pumas, with Sergeal Petersen scoring two of his side's eight tries, and winger SP Marais contributing 22 points through one try, seven conversions and a penalty. The other two matches were closer affairs, with both home teams getting a bonus point for a loss by less than seven points; Louis Fouché scored two tries and 17 points in the Free State Cheetahs' 29–33 loss to a Sharks side for whom captain Chiliboy Ralepelle also scored a brace, while Ruan Steenkamp had a memorable match for the Blue Bulls, scoring a hat-trick before getting sin-binned, but ended on the losing side against the Golden Lions, whose eighth man Hacjivah Dayimani scored two tries to secure a 38–35 win for the team from Johannesburg in the trans-Jukskei derby.

31 August 2018	Pumas	28–57	Western Province	Mbombela Stadium, Mbombela
18:30	Try: JP Lewis 30'; Le Roux Roets 34'; Trompie Pretorius 71'; Chris Smith 73'; Con: Chris Smith 32', 35', 72', 74'	Scoreboard	Try: Kobus van Dyk 6'; Sergeal Petersen 14', 61'; Ruhan Nel 20'; SP Marais 26'; Ernst van Rhyn 50'; Sikhumbuzo Notshe 54'; Herschel Jantjies 75'; Con: SP Marais 7', 15', 21', 51', 56', 62', 76'; Pen: SP Marais 40'	Referee: Marius van der Westhuizen

1 September 2018	Free State Cheetahs	29–33	Sharks	Free State Stadium, Bloemfontein
14:00	Try: Louis Fouché 24', 55'; Lloyd Greeff 28' penalty try 77'; Con: Louis Fouché 25', 56'; Pen: Louis Fouché 37'	Scoreboard	Try: Lwazi Mvovo 13'; Chiliboy Ralepelle 35', 43'; Wian Vosloo 40'; Dan du Preez 67'; Con: Robert du Preez 14', 40', 45'; Curwin Bosch 68'; Cards: Khutha Mchunu (yellow card) 77'	Referee: Jaco Peyper

1 September 2018	Blue Bulls	35–38	Golden Lions	Loftus Versfeld, Pretoria
16:05	Try: André Warner 6'; Ruan Steenkamp 13', 40', 50'; Johnny Kôtze 28'; Con: Manie Libbok 6', 14', 29', 40', 51'; Cards: Ruan Steenkamp (yellow card) 53' to 64'	Scoreboard	Try: Shaun Reynolds 4'; James Venter 22'; Dillon Smit 36'; Hacjivah Dayimani 64', 69'; Con: Shaun Reynolds 5', 23', 37', 65', 70'; Pen: Shaun Reynolds 43'	Referee: Rasta Rasivhenge

Bye/s: Griquas

==== Round Four ====
The Golden Lions and the Sharks both maintained their perfect record, making it three bonus point wins out of three. The Sharks secured a 28–12 victory over the Pumas in the Friday night game, while the Golden Lions scored seven tries in a 47–14 victory over the Free State Cheetahs, with fly-half Shaun Reynolds scoring 22 points through two tries and six conversion, with winger Sylvian Mahuza also scoring two tries. The highest-scoring game of the weekend saw the Blue Bulls move up to third after a 45–40 victory over Griquas. Two tries from Griquas centre André Swarts was not enough as the side from Pretoria scored seven tries to secure the win. A bye weekend saw Western Province drop from first to fourth on the log.

7 September 2018	Sharks	28–12	Pumas	Kings Park Stadium, Durban
19:00	Try: Jeremy Ward 20'; Johan Deysel 50'; Aphelele Fassi 55'; Curwin Bosch 58'; Con: Robert du Preez 20', 51', 56', 60'	Scoreboard	Try: Ruwellyn Isbell 36'; Le Roux Roets 39'; Con: Chris Smith 40'	Referee: Cwengile Jadezweni

8 September 2018	Griquas	40–45	Blue Bulls	Griqua Park, Kimberley
14:15	Try: NJ Oosthuizen 15'; André Swarts 35', 48' penalty try 40'; Eital Bredenkamp 45'; AJ Coertzen 74'; Con: George Whitehead 16', 36', 46', 49'; Cards: Pieter Jansen van Vuren (yellow card) 54' to 64'	Scoreboard Report	Try: André Warner 5'; Franco Naudé 19'; Jaco Visagie 22'; JT Jackson 25'; Edgar Marutlulle 55'; Jano Venter 63'; Ivan van Zyl 65'; Con: Manie Libbok 6', 20', 23', 26', 64'; Cards: Duncan Matthews (yellow card) 40' to 51'; Jaco Visagie (yellow card) 47' to 53'	Referee: Egon Seconds

8 September 2018	Golden Lions	47–14	Free State Cheetahs	Ellis Park Stadium, Johannesburg
16:20	Try: Sylvian Mahuza 6', 18'; Shaun Reynolds 14', 32'; Marvin Orie 27'; Howard Mnisi 74'; Hacjivah Dayimani 78'; Con: Shaun Reynolds 8', 15', 28', 33', 74', 79'	Scoreboard	Try: Louis Fouché 49'; Rudy Paige 59'; Con: Louis Fouché 50', 60'	Referee: AJ Jacobs

Bye/s: Western Province

==== Round Five ====
In the biggest match of the weekend, two previously-unbeaten sides in the Golden Lions and Western Province met in Johannesburg. The side from Cape Town secured a 65–38 win, scoring nine tries in the process with Dillyn Leyds and Sergeal Petersen scoring two each, while SP Marais contributed 25 of his side's points through one try, seven conversions and two penalties. The result saw Western Province move up to third on the log, one place behind the Golden Lions. The Blue Bulls moved to the top of the log following a 39–29 win over the Pumas in Pretoria, with Jade Stighling contributing two tries. In the weekend's other match, 17 points from George Whitehead and two tries from lock FP Pelser saw Griquas move up to fifth spot by beating the Free State Cheetahs 52–24, a result which confirmed that the team from Bloemfontein won't take part in the semifinals.

14 September 2018	Blue Bulls	39–29	Pumas	Loftus Versfeld, Pretoria
19:00	Try: Hanro Liebenberg 8'; Jade Stighling 11', 33'; Dayan van der Westhuizen 21'; Ivan van Zyl 53'; Jano Venter 75'; Con: Manie Libbok 9', 12', 54'; Pen: Manie Libbok 38'; Cards: Johnny Kôtze (yellow card) 14' to 26'	Scoreboard	Try: Marnus Schoeman 25'; Marko Janse van Rensburg 31'; Neil Maritz 61'; Morné Joubert 79'; Con: Chris Smith 26', 32', 62'; Pen: Chris Smith 6'	Referee: Rasta Rasivhenge

15 September 2018	Golden Lions	38–65	Western Province	Ellis Park Stadium, Johannesburg
15:00	Try: James Venter 7' penalty try 52'; Pieter Jansen 63'; Hacjivah Dayimani 65'; Len Massyn 79'; Con: Shaun Reynolds 8', 64', 66', 79'; Pen: Shaun Reynolds 16'	Scoreboard	Try: Dillyn Leyds 1', 14'; Sergeal Petersen 22', 72'; Joshua Stander 27'; SP Marais 34'; Juarno Augustus 55'; JD Schickerling 60'; Daniël du Plessis 76'; Con: SP Marais 1', 15', 23', 28', 62', 73', 77'; Pen: SP Marais 3', 12'; Cards: Ernst van Rhyn (yellow card) 52' to 64'	Referee: Jaco Peyper

15 September 2018	Griquas	52–24	Free State Cheetahs	Griqua Park, Kimberley
17:15	Try: Ederies Arendse 7'; FP Pelser 38', 50'; Enver Brandt 52'; AJ le Roux 60'; Kyle Steyn 75'; Zak Burger 80'; Con: George Whitehead 8', 39', 51', 54', 61', 76', 80'; Pen: George Whitehead 70'	Scoreboard	Try: Ali Mgijima 3'; Carel-Jan Coetzee 14', 20'; Con: Ernst Stapelberg 5', 15', 21'; Pen: Ernst Stapelberg 29'	Referee: Marius van der Westhuizen

Bye/s: Sharks

==== Round Six ====
The Sharks and Western Province both maintained their perfect starts to the season, each winning their fourth consecutive match ahead of their meeting in Round Seven. Western Province secured a 38–12 victory over Griquas, with wing Sergeal Petersen scoring two of his side's six tries to move joint-top of the try-scoring charts. Loose-forward Dan du Preez also scored a brace, for the Sharks in their 37–21 victory over a Golden Lions side that lost their second match in a row, with Sharks fly-half Robert du Preez scoring 17 points with the boot. In the other match of the weekend, Ryan Nell scored two tries as the Pumas picked up their second win of the season, beating the Free State Cheetahs 42–14 to condemn the team from Bloemfontein to a winless season, having lost all six of their matches. The Sharks and Western Province mathematically assured their semifinal berths, while the Blue Bulls, Golden Lions and Pumas remained in the race for the other two spots.

21 September 2018	Free State Cheetahs	14–42	Pumas	Free State Stadium, Bloemfontein
17:00	Try: Rudy Paige 33'; Abongile Nonkontwana 63'; Con: Ernst Stapelberg 34'; Adriaan Carelse 64'	Scoreboard	Try: Ryan Nell 9', 28'; Morné Joubert 16'; Neil Maritz 35'; Marnus Schoeman 66'; Simon Westraadt 73'; Con: Chris Smith 10', 17', 29', 37', 67'; Kobus Marais 74'	Referee: Cwengile Jadezweni

22 September 2018	Sharks	37–21	Golden Lions	Kings Park Stadium, Durban
17:15	Try: Dan du Preez 23', 47'; Louis Schreuder 33'; Luke Stringer 40'; Con: Robert du Preez 24', 33', 40', 49'; Pen: Robert du Preez 3', 14', 20'	Scoreboard	Try: Sylvian Mahuza 7'; James Venter 58'; Wandisile Simelane 75'; Con: Shaun Reynolds 8', 59'; Andries Coetzee 76'; Cards: Marvin Orie (yellow card) 38' to 47'	Referee: Egon Seconds

22 September 2018	Western Province	38–12	Griquas	Newlands Stadium, Cape Town
19:30	Try: Joshua Stander 1'; Sergeal Petersen 14', 31'; Herschel Jantjies 19'; Juarno Augustus 24'; JJ Engelbrecht 61'; Con: Joshua Stander 2', 15', 20', 25'	Scoreboard	Try: Kyle Steyn 36'; AJ Coertzen 57'; Con: George Whitehead 38'; Cards: Conway Pretorius (yellow card) 43' to 53'	Referee: AJ Jacobs

Bye/s: Blue Bulls

==== Round Seven ====
The only match of the round saw the top two sides, the Sharks and Western Province meet in Cape Town. The home side won the match 50–28 with SP Marais contributing 20 of his side's points, securing a home semi-final in the process.

29 September 2018	Western Province	50–28	Sharks	Newlands Stadium, Cape Town
14:00	Try: Jaco Coetzee 4'; Ruhan Nel 9'; Dillyn Leyds 23'; Sergeal Petersen 25'; SP Marais 64'; JJ Engelbrecht 72'; Chad Solomon 79'; Con: SP Marais 5', 11', 24', 27', 73', 80'; Pen: SP Marais 16'	Scoreboard	Try: Marius Louw 1'; Tyler Paul 32'; Gideon Koegelenberg 40'; Aphelele Fassi 44'; Con: Robert du Preez 2', 33', 40', 46'	Referee: Ben Crouse

Bye/s: Blue Bulls, Free State Cheetahs, Golden Lions, Griquas, Pumas

==== Round Eight ====
Round Eight saw a full round of three matches being played, with the first of these finalising the semifinal lineup; the Golden Lions beat the Pumas 33–21 in Mbombela — with both Corné Fourie and Courtnall Skosan scoring a brace of tries — to end the latter's involvement in the competition and ensuring the Golden Lions and the Blue Bulls advanced to the knockout stage. The Sharks clinched a home semifinal by easily beating Griquas in Kimberley, with wingers Lwazi Mvovo and Leolin Zas each scoring two tries in a 41–11 win. The final match of the round between the Blue Bulls and Western Province lasted just 40 minutes; after a delayed start in the match due to lightning, some play was possible before the match was abandoned at half-time due to ever-worsening weather conditions. Western Province were leading 34–7, and this was declared the final result of the match following the abandonment.

12 October 2018	Pumas	21–33	Golden Lions	Mbombela Stadium, Mbombela
19:00	Try: Devon Williams 4'; Francois Kleinhans 32'; Ryan Nell 67'; Con: Chris Smith 5'; Kobus Marais 34', 68'; Cards: Francois Kleinhans (yellow card) 39' to 49'	Scoreboard	Try: Lionel Mapoe 1'; Corné Fourie 13', 59'; Courtnall Skosan 36', 47'; Con: Elton Jantjies 2', 14', 36', 61'; Cards: Howard Mnisi (yellow card) 29' to 39'	Referee: Rasta Rasivhenge

13 October 2018	Griquas	11–41	Sharks	Griqua Park, Kimberley
15:00	Try: Kyle Steyn 76'; Pen: George Whitehead 2', 25'	Scoreboard	Try: Jeremy Ward 6'; Lwazi Mvovo 14', 37'; Akker van der Merwe 28'; Leolin Zas 44', 62'; S'busiso Nkosi 49'; Con: Curwin Bosch 29', 38', 46'	Referee: Marius van der Westhuizen

13 October 2018	Blue Bulls	7–34 (abd.)	Western Province	Loftus Versfeld, Pretoria
17:15	Try: Ruan Steenkamp 24'; Con: Tinus de Beer 24'; Cards: Matthys Basson (yellow card) 15' to 26'	Scoreboard	Try: penalty try 15'; Kobus van Dyk 31'; Sergeal Petersen 33'; Jaco Coetzee 39'; Con: SP Marais 31', 33', 40'; Pen: SP Marais 7', 18'	Referee: Egon Seconds

Bye/s: Free State Cheetahs

== Play-offs ==
=== Title play-offs ===
==== Semifinals ====
The semifinal matches went according to form, with the top two teams from the pool stage and home semifinalists Sharks and Western Province both winning. Dan du Preez and S'busiso Nkosi each scored two tries in the Sharks' 33–24 victory over the Golden Lions, for whom Courtnall Skosan also scored a brace. Western Province and the Blue Bulls met for the second week in a row, but unlike the Round Eight match that saw Western Province win in a 40-minute match, this encounter finished 32–all during normal time, with the Blue Bulls' Dylan Sage scoring a try after the final hooter to level the scores and send the match into extra time. Western Province recovered and retained their lead to win 35–32 after extra time, thanks to a penalty from SP Marais, who scored 30 of his side's points in the victory.

20 October 2018	Sharks	33–24	Golden Lions	Kings Park Stadium, Durban
14:30	Try: Dan du Preez 2', 74'; S'busiso Nkosi 20', 41'; Con: Robert du Preez 3', 76'; Pen: Robert du Preez 11', 31', 66'	Scoreboard	Try: Nic Groom 55'; Courtnall Skosan 62', 69'; Con: Elton Jantjies 56', 63', 70'; Pen: Elton Jantjies 34'	Referee: Marius van der Westhuizen

20 October 2018	Western Province	35–32 (a.e.t.)	Blue Bulls	Newlands Stadium, Cape Town
17:00	Try: SP Marais 51'; Paul de Wet 59'; Con: SP Marais 52', 60'; Pen: SP Marais 9', 14', 30', 36', 40', 62', 94'	Scoreboard	Try: Ruan Steenkamp 22'; Duncan Matthews 27'; Manie Libbok 46'; Dylan Sage 80'; Con: Manie Libbok 22', 27', 47'; Pen: Manie Libbok 34', 55'	Referee: Egon Seconds

==== Final ====
The Sharks won their first title since 2013 after beating Western Province 17–12 in Cape Town. The only points in the first half came from the boot of Western Province kicker SP Marais, who slotted penalties in the 19th and 35th minutes to secure a 6–0 half-time lead for the home side. A try for Sharks hooker Akker van der Merwe, converted by fly-half Robert du Preez, saw the Sharks take a 7–6 lead shortly after the interval. A Marais penalty in the 49th minute restored Western Province's lead, but Du Preez responded in kind two minutes later to restore the Sharks' lead. The decisive score came in the 70th minute, when Sharks flank Tyler Paul scored a try — again converted by Du Preez — to make the scoreline 17–9. A penalty from Damian Willemse wasn't enough for the home side, and the Sharks secured the eighth Currie Cup title in their history.

27 October 2018	Western Province	12–17	Sharks	Newlands Stadium, Cape Town
16:00	Pen: SP Marais 19', 35', 49'; Damian Willemse 74'	Scoreboard	Try: Akker van der Merwe 43'; Tyler Paul 70'; Con: Robert du Preez 46', 71'; Pen: Robert du Preez 51'	Referee: Jaco Peyper

=== Relegation play-off ===
30 October 2018	Free State Cheetahs	36–5	SWD Eagles	Free State Stadium, Bloemfontein
18:00	Try: Penalty try 12'; Rabz Maxwane 18' c Tian Schoeman 20' m Louis Fouché 54' c William Small-Smith 63' m, 78' m Con: Louis Fouché 20', 55'	Scoreboard	Try: Vuyo Mbotho 60' m Cards: Vukile Sofisa (yellow card) 11' to 22'	Referee: Jaco Peyper

- Free State Cheetahs remained in the Currie Cup Premier Division for 2019.
- SWD Eagles remained in the Currie Cup First Division for 2019.

== Honours ==
The honour roll for the 2018 Currie Cup Premier Division was as follows:

2018 Currie Cup Premier Division
Champions:	Sharks (8th title)
Top points scorer:	SP Marais, Western Province (130)
Top try scorer:	Sergeal Petersen, Western Province (8)

== Players ==
The squads and player appearance and scoring statistics for the 2018 Currie Cup Premier Division are as follows:

Blue Bulls
Name	FSC	SHA	LIO	GRQ	PMA	WPr	WPr	F	App	Try	Con	Pen	DG	Pts
Matthys Basson	1	1	1	1	1	1		—N/a	6	0	0	0	0	0
Edgar Marutlulle	2	16 (substituted in)	16	16 (substituted in)	16 (substituted in)	16	16 (substituted in)	—N/a	5	1	0	0	0	5
Conraad van Vuuren	3	3	17 (substituted in)		17 (substituted in)		18 (substituted in)	—N/a	5	0	0	0	0	0
Ruben van Heerden	4							—N/a	1	0	0	0	0	0
Ruan Nortjé	5	5	18 (substituted in)	18 (substituted in)	18 (substituted in)	18	19 (substituted in)	—N/a	6	0	0	0	0	0
Ruan Steenkamp	6	6	6	6	6	6	6	—N/a	7	5	0	0	0	25
Thembelani Bholi	7	7	19 (substituted in)	19 (substituted in)				—N/a	4	0	0	0	0	0
Hanro Liebenberg	8	8	8		8	8	8	—N/a	6	1	0	0	0	5
André Warner	9	9	9	9	20 (substituted in)			—N/a	5	2	0	0	0	10
Manie Libbok	10	10	10	10	10	10	10	—N/a	7	2	20	6	0	68
Jamba Ulengo	11	11	11			11		—N/a	4	0	0	0	0	0
JT Jackson	12	22 (substituted in)	12	12				—N/a	4	1	0	0	0	5
Johnny Kôtze	13	12	13		13	13	12	—N/a	6	1	0	0	0	5
Jade Stighling	14	14	14	11	14	14	11	—N/a	7	3	0	0	0	15
Divan Rossouw	15	15	15	15	15	15	15	—N/a	7	1	0	0	0	5
Jan-Henning Campher	16 (substituted in)							—N/a	1	0	0	0	0	0
Dayan van der Westhuizen	17 (substituted in)	17 (substituted in)		17 (substituted in)	3	17 (substituted in)	3	—N/a	6	1	0	0	0	5
Hendré Stassen	18 (substituted in)	4	4	4	4	4	4	—N/a	7	0	0	0	0	0
Jano Venter	19 (substituted in)	19 (substituted in)	7	7	19 (substituted in)			—N/a	5	2	0	0	0	10
Theo Maree	20 (substituted in)							—N/a	1	0	0	0	0	0
Tony Jantjies	21	21 (substituted in)						—N/a	1	0	0	0	0	0
Earll Douwrie	22							—N/a	0	0	0	0	0	0
Jaco Visagie		2	2	2	2	2	2	—N/a	6	1	0	0	0	5
Jesse Kriel		13						—N/a	1	1	0	0	0	5
Eli Snyman		18 (substituted in)	5	5	5	5	5	—N/a	6	0	0	0	0	0
Reagan Oranje		20						—N/a	0	0	0	0	0	0
Trevor Nyakane			3	3		3	1	—N/a	4	0	0	0	0	0
Ivan van Zyl			20 (substituted in)	20 (substituted in)	9	9	9	—N/a	5	2	0	0	0	10
Tinus de Beer			21 (substituted in)	21	21 (substituted in)	21 (substituted in)	22	—N/a	3	0	1	0	0	2
Duncan Matthews			22 (substituted in)	14	11		14	—N/a	4	1	0	0	0	5
Nick de Jager				8	7	19	20 (substituted in)	—N/a	3	0	0	0	0	0
Franco Naudé				13	12	12	23 (substituted in)	—N/a	4	1	0	0	0	5
Dylan Sage				22 (substituted in)	22 (substituted in)	22	13	—N/a	3	1	0	0	0	5
Marco van Staden						7	7	—N/a	2	0	0	0	0	0
Embrose Papier						20	21 (substituted in)	—N/a	1	0	0	0	0	0
Frans van Wyk							17 (substituted in)	—N/a	1	0	0	0	0	0
penalty try									–	1	–	–	–	7
Total									7	28	21	6	0	202
Carel du Preez, Dan Kapepula, Mosolwa Mafuma, Boom Prinsloo, Paul Schoeman and Victor Sekekete were named in the squad, but not included in a matchday squad.

Free State Cheetahs
Name	BUL	WPr	SHA	LIO	GRQ	PMA	SF	F	App	Try	Con	Pen	DG	Pts
Ox Nché	1	1					—N/a	—N/a	2	0	0	0	0	0
Joseph Dweba	2	2					—N/a	—N/a	2	1	0	0	0	5
Luan de Bruin	3	18 (substituted in)					—N/a	—N/a	2	0	0	0	0	0
Justin Basson	4	4					—N/a	—N/a	2	0	0	0	0	0
JP du Preez	5						—N/a	—N/a	1	0	0	0	0	0
Junior Pokomela	6	20 (substituted in)					—N/a	—N/a	2	0	0	0	0	0
Oupa Mohojé	7	7					—N/a	—N/a	2	0	0	0	0	0
Niell Jordaan	8		8	8			—N/a	—N/a	3	0	0	0	0	0
Rudy Paige	9		9	9	9	9	—N/a	—N/a	5	2	0	0	0	10
Tian Schoeman	10						—N/a	—N/a	1	0	1	0	0	2
William Small-Smith	11	14					—N/a	—N/a	2	0	0	0	0	0
Nico Lee	12	12					—N/a	—N/a	2	0	0	0	0	0
Benhard Janse van Rensburg	13						—N/a	—N/a	1	0	0	0	0	0
Rabz Maxwane	14	11					—N/a	—N/a	2	0	0	0	0	0
Malcolm Jaer	15	15					—N/a	—N/a	2	0	0	0	0	0
Jacques du Toit	16 (substituted in)	16 (substituted in)					—N/a	—N/a	2	0	0	0	0	0
Erich de Jager	17 (substituted in)						—N/a	—N/a	1	0	0	0	0	0
Günther Janse van Vuuren	18 (substituted in)	3	3	3			—N/a	—N/a	4	0	0	0	0	0
Dennis Visser	19 (substituted in)	5	5	5		4	—N/a	—N/a	5	0	0	0	0	0
Gerhard Olivier	20 (substituted in)		7				—N/a	—N/a	2	0	0	0	0	0
Shaun Venter	21 (substituted in)	21 (substituted in)					—N/a	—N/a	2	1	0	0	0	5
Louis Fouché	22 (substituted in)	10	10	10			—N/a	—N/a	4	3	4	1	0	26
Jasper Wiese		6					—N/a	—N/a	1	0	0	0	0	0
Aidon Davis		8					—N/a	—N/a	1	0	0	0	0	0
Tian Meyer		9					—N/a	—N/a	1	0	0	0	0	0
Dries Swanepoel		13					—N/a	—N/a	1	0	0	0	0	0
Kevin Stevens		17 (substituted in)	1	1	17 (substituted in)		—N/a	—N/a	4	0	0	0	0	0
Stephan Malan		19 (substituted in)	6	7	8		—N/a	—N/a	4	0	0	0	0	0
Ernst Stapelberg		22 (substituted in)			10	10	—N/a	—N/a	3	0	4	1	0	11
Reinach Venter			2	2	2	3	—N/a	—N/a	4	0	0	0	0	0
Louis Conradie			4	4	5	5	—N/a	—N/a	4	0	0	0	0	0
Lloyd Greeff			11	11			—N/a	—N/a	2	1	0	0	0	5
Tertius Kruger			12	12	12	12	—N/a	—N/a	4	0	0	0	0	0
Carel-Jan Coetzee			13	13	13	13	—N/a	—N/a	4	2	0	0	0	10
Ali Mgijima			14	14	14	14	—N/a	—N/a	4	1	0	0	0	5
Adriaan Carelse			15	15	15	15	—N/a	—N/a	4	0	1	0	0	2
Jannes Snyman			16 (substituted in)	16 (substituted in)	6	7	—N/a	—N/a	4	0	0	0	0	0
Johan Kotze			17 (substituted in)	17 (substituted in)	1	1	—N/a	—N/a	4	0	0	0	0	0
Luigy van Jaarsveld			18 (substituted in)	18 (substituted in)	19 (substituted in)	19 (substituted in)	—N/a	—N/a	4	0	0	0	0	0
Abongile Nonkontwana			19 (substituted in)	6	4	6	—N/a	—N/a	4	1	0	0	0	5
Dian Badenhorst			20 (substituted in)	20 (substituted in)	21 (substituted in)	20 (substituted in)	—N/a	—N/a	4	0	0	0	0	0
Vuyani Maqina			21 (substituted in)	21 (substituted in)	11	11	—N/a	—N/a	4	0	0	0	0	0
Reinhardt Erwee			22 (substituted in)	22 (substituted in)	22 (substituted in)	21 (substituted in)	—N/a	—N/a	4	0	0	0	0	0
Nardus Erasmus				19 (substituted in)	18 (substituted in)	18 (substituted in)	—N/a	—N/a	3	0	0	0	0	0
Kabous van Schalkwyk					3	17 (substituted in)	—N/a	—N/a	2	0	0	0	0	0
Daniel Maartens					7	8	—N/a	—N/a	2	0	0	0	0	0
Hanno Snyman					16 (substituted in)	16 (substituted in)	—N/a	—N/a	2	0	0	0	0	0
Maphutha Dolo					20 (substituted in)	22 (substituted in)	—N/a	—N/a	2	0	0	0	0	0
Elandré Huggett						2	—N/a	—N/a	1	0	0	0	0	0
penalty try									–	1	–	–	–	7
Total									6	13	10	2	0	93
Darren Adonis, Francois Agenbach, Aranos Coetzee, Ryno Eksteen, Charles Marais, Zee Mkhabela, Lotter Pretorius, Walt Steenkamp and Marnus van der Merwe and Raymond Woest were named in the squad, but not included in a matchday squad.

Golden Lions
Name	GRQ	BUL	FSC	WPr	SHA	PMA	SHA	F	App	Try	Con	Pen	DG	Pts
Sti Sithole	1	1	1	1	1	1	1	—N/a	7	0	0	0	0	0
Corné Fourie	2	2	16 (substituted in)	2	16 (substituted in)	2		—N/a	6	2	0	0	0	10
Johannes Jonker	3	3		17 (substituted in)	3			—N/a	4	0	0	0	0	0
Rhyno Herbst	4	4	4	4	4	4	4	—N/a	7	0	0	0	0	0
Marvin Orie	5	5	5	5	5	5	5	—N/a	7	1	0	0	0	5
James Venter	6	6	6	6	6	6	6	—N/a	7	3	0	0	0	15
Len Massyn	7	7	7	7	7	20		—N/a	5	2	0	0	0	10
Hacjivah Dayimani	8	8	8	8	8	8	20 (substituted in)	—N/a	7	6	0	0	0	30
Ross Cronjé	9				9			—N/a	2	1	0	0	0	5
Shaun Reynolds	10	10	10	10	10	22 (substituted in)	22 (substituted in)	—N/a	7	3	24	3	0	72
Courtnall Skosan	11	11	11	11	11	11	14	—N/a	7	7	0	0	0	35
Manuel Rass	12							—N/a	1	0	0	0	0	0
Jan-Louis la Grange	13							—N/a	1	0	0	0	0	0
Sylvian Mahuza	14	14	15	14	14	15	15	—N/a	7	4	0	0	0	20
Andries Coetzee	15	15		15	15			—N/a	4	0	1	0	0	2
HP van Schoor	16 (substituted in)							—N/a	1	0	0	0	0	0
Jacobie Adriaanse	17 (substituted in)	18 (substituted in)	3	3		3		—N/a	5	0	0	0	0	0
PJ Steenkamp	18 (substituted in)							—N/a	1	0	0	0	0	0
Vincent Tshituka	19 (substituted in)	20 (substituted in)	20 (substituted in)				19 (substituted in)	—N/a	4	0	0	0	0	0
Dillon Smit	20 (substituted in)	9	9	9		21 (substituted in)	21 (substituted in)	—N/a	6	1	0	0	0	5
Tyrone Green	21 (substituted in)							—N/a	1	0	0	0	0	0
Wandisile Simelane	22 (substituted in)	22 (substituted in)	22 (substituted in)	22 (substituted in)	22 (substituted in)	14	23 (substituted in)	—N/a	7	2	0	0	0	10
Howard Mnisi		12	12	12	12	12	12	—N/a	6	1	0	0	0	5
Lionel Mapoe		13	13	13	13	13	13	—N/a	6	1	0	0	0	5
Pieter Jansen		16 (substituted in)	2	16 (substituted in)	2	16 (substituted in)	2	—N/a	6	1	0	0	0	5
Danie Mienie		17 (substituted in)	17 (substituted in)			17 (substituted in)	18 (substituted in)	—N/a	4	0	0	0	0	0
Reinhard Nothnagel		19 (substituted in)	19 (substituted in)	18 (substituted in)	18 (substituted in)			—N/a	4	0	0	0	0	0
Madosh Tambwe		21 (substituted in)	14					—N/a	2	0	0	0	0	0
Stephen Bhasera			18 (substituted in)		17 (substituted in)			—N/a	2	0	0	0	0	0
Bradley Thain			21 (substituted in)					—N/a	1	0	0	0	0	0
Driaan Bester				19 (substituted in)	19 (substituted in)	19 (substituted in)		—N/a	3	0	0	0	0	0
Nic Groom				20 (substituted in)	20 (substituted in)	9	9	—N/a	4	1	0	0	0	5
Gianni Lombard				21 (substituted in)	21 (substituted in)			—N/a	2	0	0	0	0	0
Jo-Hanko de Villiers						7	7	—N/a	2	0	0	0	0	0
Elton Jantjies						10	10	—N/a	2	0	7	1	0	17
Chergin Fillies						18 (substituted in)	3	—N/a	2	0	0	0	0	0
Warren Whiteley							8	—N/a	1	0	0	0	0	0
Aphiwe Dyantyi							11	—N/a	1	0	0	0	0	0
Tiaan van der Merwe							16 (substituted in)	—N/a	1	0	0	0	0	0
Leo Kruger							17 (substituted in)	—N/a	1	0	0	0	0	0
penalty try									–	1	–	–	–	7
Total									7	37	32	4	0	263
Ashlon Davids and Malcolm Marx were named in the squad, but not included in a matchday squad.

Griquas
Name	PMA	LIO	BUL	FSC	WPr	SHA	SF	F	App	Try	Con	Pen	DG	Pts
Devon Martinus	1	1	1		1	1	—N/a	—N/a	5	0	0	0	0	0
Khwezi Mkhafu	2	2	2		2	2	—N/a	—N/a	5	1	0	0	0	5
NJ Oosthuizen	3	3	3	17 (substituted in)	3	17 (substituted in)	—N/a	—N/a	6	1	0	0	0	5
Sintu Manjezi	4	4	4		19 (substituted in)	4	—N/a	—N/a	5	0	0	0	0	0
FP Pelser	5			18 (substituted in)	4		—N/a	—N/a	3	2	0	0	0	10
Wendal Wehr	6	6		19 (substituted in)	21 (substituted in)	6	—N/a	—N/a	5	0	0	0	0	0
Sias Koen	7	7	7	7	7	7	—N/a	—N/a	6	0	0	0	0	0
Conway Pretorius	8	8	8		8	8	—N/a	—N/a	5	1	0	0	0	5
Christiaan Meyer	9	9	9	9			—N/a	—N/a	4	1	0	0	0	5
George Whitehead	10	10	10	10	10	10	—N/a	—N/a	6	0	19	5	0	53
Godfrey Ramaboea	11						—N/a	—N/a	1	0	0	0	0	0
Christopher Bosch	12	12	21 (substituted in)	22 (substituted in)	22 (substituted in)		—N/a	—N/a	5	0	0	0	0	0
Kyle Steyn	13	13	13	13	13	13	—N/a	—N/a	6	4	0	0	0	20
Ederies Arendse	14	14	14	14	14	14	—N/a	—N/a	6	1	0	0	0	5
AJ Coertzen	15	11	15	15	15	15	—N/a	—N/a	6	4	0	0	0	20
AJ le Roux	16 (substituted in)			16 (substituted in)	16 (substituted in)		—N/a	—N/a	3	1	0	0	0	5
Liam Hendricks	17 (substituted in)			1	17 (substituted in)	16 (substituted in)	—N/a	—N/a	4	0	0	0	0	0
Ruan Kramer	18 (substituted in)	17 (substituted in)	17 (substituted in)				—N/a	—N/a	3	0	0	0	0	0
Pieter Jansen van Vuren	19 (substituted in)	5	5	5	5	5	—N/a	—N/a	6	0	0	0	0	0
Zak Burger	20 (substituted in)	20 (substituted in)	20 (substituted in)	20 (substituted in)	9	9	—N/a	—N/a	6	1	0	0	0	5
Jono Janse van Rensburg	21 (substituted in)	21 (substituted in)	19 (substituted in)	8		18 (substituted in)	—N/a	—N/a	5	0	0	0	0	0
André Swarts	22 (substituted in)	22 (substituted in)	12	12	12	12	—N/a	—N/a	6	3	0	0	0	15
Eric Zana		15					—N/a	—N/a	1	0	0	0	0	0
Wilmar Arnoldi		16 (substituted in)	16 (substituted in)	2			—N/a	—N/a	3	1	0	0	0	5
Wandile Putuma		18 (substituted in)	18 (substituted in)	4			—N/a	—N/a	3	0	0	0	0	0
Eital Bredenkamp		19 (substituted in)	6	6	6	19 (substituted in)	—N/a	—N/a	5	1	0	0	0	5
Enver Brandt			11	11	11	11	—N/a	—N/a	4	1	0	0	0	5
Tythan Adams			22 (substituted in)				—N/a	—N/a	1	0	0	0	0	0
Ewald van der Westhuizen				3	18 (substituted in)	3	—N/a	—N/a	3	0	0	0	0	0
Stephan Janse van Rensburg				21 (substituted in)	20 (substituted in)	22 (substituted in)	—N/a	—N/a	3	0	0	0	0	0
Louis Venter						20 (substituted in)	—N/a	—N/a	1	0	0	0	0	0
Edwin Sass						21 (substituted in)	—N/a	—N/a	1	0	0	0	0	0
penalty try									–	1	–	–	–	7
Total									6	24	19	5	0	175
Doctor Booysen, Renier Botha, Johnathan Francke, Jeremy Jordaan, Kevin Kaba, De Wet Kruger, Shaun McDonald and Luxolo Ntsepe were named in the squad, but not included in a matchday squad.

Pumas
Name	GRQ	WPr	SHA	BUL	FSC	LIO	SF	F	App	Try	Con	Pen	DG	Pts
Khwezi Mona	1	1	1	1			—N/a	—N/a	4	0	0	0	0	0
Simon Westraadt	2	2		16 (substituted in)	16 (substituted in)	16 (substituted in)	—N/a	—N/a	5	1	0	0	0	5
Marné Coetzee	3	3	3			3	—N/a	—N/a	4	0	0	0	0	0
Le Roux Roets	4	4	4	4	4	4	—N/a	—N/a	6	2	0	0	0	10
Cameron Lindsay	5	5	18 (substituted in)		18 (substituted in)	5	—N/a	—N/a	5	0	0	0	0	0
Marnus Schoeman	6	6	6	6	6	6	—N/a	—N/a	6	3	0	0	0	15
Stefan Willemse	7	7	7	7		18 (substituted in)	—N/a	—N/a	5	0	0	0	0	0
Willie Engelbrecht	8	8	8	8	7	7	—N/a	—N/a	6	0	0	0	0	0
Stefan Ungerer	9	9	9	9	9	9	—N/a	—N/a	6	1	0	0	0	5
Chris Smith	10	10	10	10	10	10	—N/a	—N/a	6	2	18	4	0	58
Neil Maritz	11	11	14	13	13	13	—N/a	—N/a	6	3	0	0	0	15
Hennie Skorbinski	12	12	12				—N/a	—N/a	3	1	0	0	0	5
Ryan Nell	13	13	13	12	12	12	—N/a	—N/a	6	3	0	0	0	15
JP Lewis	14	14					—N/a	—N/a	2	1	0	0	0	5
Gerrit Smith	15	15	15				—N/a	—N/a	3	0	0	0	0	0
Marko Janse van Rensburg	16 (substituted in)	16 (substituted in)	2	2	2	2	—N/a	—N/a	6	1	0	0	0	5
Andrew Beerwinkel	17 (substituted in)	17 (substituted in)	17 (substituted in)	3	3	17 (substituted in)	—N/a	—N/a	6	0	0	0	0	0
Hugo Kloppers	18 (substituted in)	18 (substituted in)	5	5	5		—N/a	—N/a	5	0	0	0	0	0
Jeandré Rudolph	19 (substituted in)		19 (substituted in)		8	19 (substituted in)	—N/a	—N/a	4	0	0	0	0	0
Reynier van Rooyen	20 (substituted in)	21 (substituted in)	21 (substituted in)				—N/a	—N/a	3	0	0	0	0	0
Justin van Staden	21 (substituted in)						—N/a	—N/a	1	0	0	0	0	0
Trompie Pretorius	22 (substituted in)	22 (substituted in)	22 (substituted in)				—N/a	—N/a	3	1	0	0	0	5
Hilton Lobberts		19 (substituted in)		18 (substituted in)			—N/a	—N/a	2	0	0	0	0	0
Nardus van der Walt		20 (substituted in)					—N/a	—N/a	1	0	0	0	0	0
Ruwellyn Isbell			11	11	11	11	—N/a	—N/a	4	1	0	0	0	5
Frank Herne			16 (substituted in)				—N/a	—N/a	1	0	0	0	0	0
Francois Kleinhans			20 (substituted in)	19 (substituted in)	19 (substituted in)	8	—N/a	—N/a	4	1	0	0	0	5
Morné Joubert				14	14	14	—N/a	—N/a	3	2	0	0	0	10
Devon Williams				15	15	15	—N/a	—N/a	3	1	0	0	0	5
De-Jay Terblanche				17 (substituted in)	17 (substituted in)		—N/a	—N/a	2	0	0	0	0	0
Abrie Griesel				20 (substituted in)	20 (substituted in)	20 (substituted in)	—N/a	—N/a	3	0	0	0	0	0
Kobus Marais				21 (substituted in)	21 (substituted in)	21 (substituted in)	—N/a	—N/a	3	0	3	0	0	6
Henko Marais				22 (substituted in)	22 (substituted in)	22 (substituted in)	—N/a	—N/a	3	0	0	0	0	0
Morgan Naudé					1	1	—N/a	—N/a	2	0	0	0	0	0
Total									6	24	21	4	0	174
Louis Albertse, Gert Cronjé, Tazz Fuzani, Reuben Johannes, Ruaan Lerm, Brian Shabangu, Barend Smit, Jannie Stander, Boeta Vermaak and Alwayno Visagie were named in the squad, but not included in a matchday squad.

Sharks
Name	BUL	FSC	PMA	LIO	WPr	GRQ	LIO	WPr	App	Try	Con	Pen	DG	Pts
Juan Schoeman	1	1	1	1	1	1	1	1	8	1	0	0	0	5
Chiliboy Ralepelle	2	2	2	2	2	16 (substituted in)	16 (substituted in)	16 (substituted in)	8	2	0	0	0	10
John-Hubert Meyer	3	3	3			17 (substituted in)			4	0	0	0	0	0
Gideon Koegelenberg	4	4	4	4	4	4	4	4	8	1	0	0	0	5
Hyron Andrews	5	5	5	5	5	5	5	5	8	0	0	0	0	0
Wian Vosloo	6	6	19 (substituted in)						3	1	0	0	0	5
Tyler Paul	7	7	7	7	7	8	7	6	8	2	0	0	0	10
Dan du Preez	8	8	8	8	8		8	8	7	5	0	0	0	25
Louis Schreuder	9	9	9	9	9	9	9	9	8	1	0	0	0	5
Robert du Preez	10	10	10	10	10	12	10	10	8	0	22	7	0	65
Lwazi Mvovo	11	11	11	11	11	11	11		7	3	0	0	0	15
Marius Louw	12	12	12	12	12	21 (substituted in)	12	12	8	1	0	0	0	5
Jeremy Ward	13	13	13	13	13	13	13	13	8	2	0	0	0	10
Kobus van Wyk	14	14	14	14	14			22 (substituted in)	6	1	0	0	0	5
Curwin Bosch	15	15	22 (substituted in)	15	15	10	15	15	8	2	4	0	0	18
Kerron van Vuuren	16 (substituted in)	16 (substituted in)							2	0	0	0	0	0
Khutha Mchunu	17 (substituted in)	17 (substituted in)	17 (substituted in)						3	0	0	0	0	0
Andrew Evans	18 (substituted in)	18 (substituted in)	18 (substituted in)						3	0	0	0	0	0
Tera Mtembu	19 (substituted in)								1	0	0	0	0	0
Cameron Wright	20 (substituted in)	20 (substituted in)	20 (substituted in)	20 (substituted in)	20 (substituted in)		21 (substituted in)	21 (substituted in)	7	0	0	0	0	0
Johan Deysel	21 (substituted in)	21 (substituted in)	21 (substituted in)						3	1	0	0	0	5
Aphelele Fassi	22 (substituted in)	22 (substituted in)	15	22 (substituted in)	22 (substituted in)	15	23 (substituted in)	11	8	3	0	0	0	15
Luke Stringer		19 (substituted in)	6	6	19 (substituted in)	6	19 (substituted in)	20 (substituted in)	7	1	0	0	0	5
Akker van der Merwe			16 (substituted in)	16 (substituted in)	16 (substituted in)	2	2	2	6	2	0	0	0	10
Thomas du Toit				3	3		3	3	4	0	0	0	0	0
Coenie Oosthuizen				17 (substituted in)	17 (substituted in)	3	18 (substituted in)	18 (substituted in)	5	0	0	0	0	0
Ruben van Heerden				18 (substituted in)	18 (substituted in)				2	0	0	0	0	0
Jacques Vermeulen				19 (substituted in)	6	7	6	19 (substituted in)	5	0	0	0	0	0
S'busiso Nkosi				21 (substituted in)		14	14	14	4	3	0	0	0	15
Leolin Zas					21 (substituted in)	22 (substituted in)	22 (substituted in)	23 (substituted in)	4	2	0	0	0	10
JJ van der Mescht						18 (substituted in)			1	0	0	0	0	0
Jean-Luc du Preez						19 (substituted in)	20 (substituted in)	7	3	0	0	0	0	0
Grant Williams						20 (substituted in)			1	0	0	0	0	0
Mzamo Majola							17 (substituted in)	17	1	0	0	0	0	0
Total									8	34	26	7	0	243
Lukhanyo Am, Tristan Blewett, Phepsi Buthelezi, Kwanda Dimaza, Andrew du Plessis, Makazole Mapimpi, Michael Meyer, Tendai Mtawarira, Bandisa Ndlovu, Rhyno Smith, Danrich Visagie and Courtney Winnaar were named in the squad, but not included in a matchday squad.

Western Province
Name	FSC	PMA	LIO	GRQ	SHA	BUL	BUL	SHA	App	Try	Con	Pen	DG	Pts
Alistair Vermaak	1	1	1		1	1	1	1	7	0	0	0	0	0
Scarra Ntubeni	2	2	2	16 (substituted in)	2	2	16 (substituted in)	16 (substituted in)	8	1	0	0	0	5
Michael Kumbirai	3	18 (substituted in)	3	18 (substituted in)	3		18 (substituted in)	18 (substituted in)	7	0	0	0	0	0
Salmaan Moerat	4		19 (substituted in)	4	19 (substituted in)	19	19 (substituted in)	19 (substituted in)	6	0	0	0	0	0
JD Schickerling	5	5	5		5	5	5	5	7	2	0	0	0	10
Sikhumbuzo Notshe	6	6		6		8		8	5	1	0	0	0	5
Kobus van Dyk	7	7	6	7	6	6	6	6	8	2	0	0	0	10
Juarno Augustus	8	8	8	8			8		5	3	0	0	0	15
Jano Vermaak	9	9	9		9				4	0	0	0	0	0
Joshua Stander	10	10	10	10	10	10	22 (substituted in)	10	8	2	4	0	0	18
Dillyn Leyds	11	15	15	22 (substituted in)	15		15	15	7	3	0	0	0	15
Dan Kriel	12		12	12	12		12	22 (substituted in)	6	0	0	0	0	0
Ruhan Nel	13	13	13	13	13	13	13	13	8	3	0	0	0	15
JJ Engelbrecht	14			11	22 (substituted in)	22	23 (substituted in)	23 (substituted in)	5	2	0	0	0	10
SP Marais	15	11	11		11	11	11	11	7	4	28	18	0	130
Chad Solomon	16 (substituted in)	16 (substituted in)	16 (substituted in)		16 (substituted in)	16			4	1	0	0	0	5
Caylib Oosthuizen	17 (substituted in)	17 (substituted in)	17 (substituted in)	1	17 (substituted in)	17	17 (substituted in)	17 (substituted in)	7	0	0	0	0	0
Neethling Fouché	18 (substituted in)					18			1	0	0	0	0	0
Ernst van Rhyn	19 (substituted in)	4	7	19 (substituted in)	7	7	7	7	8	1	0	0	0	5
Herschel Jantjies	20 (substituted in)	20 (substituted in)		9	21 (substituted in)	9	9	9	7	2	0	0	0	10
Chris Massyn	21 (substituted in)		20 (substituted in)	17 (substituted in)	20 (substituted in)				4	0	0	0	0	0
Sergeal Petersen	22 (substituted in)	14	14	14	14	14	14	14	8	8	0	0	0	40
Wilco Louw		3		3		3	3	3	5	0	0	0	0	0
Damian de Allende		12							1	0	0	0	0	0
Chris van Zyl		19 (substituted in)	4	5	4	4	4	4	7	0	0	0	0	0
Daniël du Plessis		21 (substituted in)	22 (substituted in)	21 (substituted in)		12			4	1	0	0	0	5
Craig Barry		22 (substituted in)							1	0	0	0	0	0
Carlü Sadie			18 (substituted in)		18 (substituted in)				2	0	0	0	0	0
Paul de Wet			21 (substituted in)			21	21 (substituted in)		2	1	0	0	0	5
Bongi Mbonambi				2			2	2	3	0	0	0	0	0
Damian Willemse				15		15	10	12	4	0	0	1	0	3
Justin Phillips				20 (substituted in)				21 (substituted in)	2	0	0	0	0	0
Jaco Coetzee					8	20 (substituted in)	20 (substituted in)	20 (substituted in)	4	2	0	0	0	10
penalty try									–	1	–	–	–	7
Total									8	47	32	12	0	323
Stephan de Wit, Johan du Toit, Pieter-Steph du Toit, Eben Etzebeth, Steven Kitshoff, Siya Kolisi, Frans Malherbe, Dean Muir, Marno Redelinghuys, Duncan Saal, Ramone Samuels, Edwill van der Merwe, EW Viljoen and Cobus Wiese were named in the squad, but not included in a matchday squad.

== Referees ==
The following referees officiated matches in the 2018 Currie Cup Premier Division:

- Ben Crouse
- AJ Jacobs
- Cwengile Jadezweni
- Dan Jones
- Jaco Peyper
- Rasta Rasivhenge
- Egon Seconds
- Marius van der Westhuizen

== See also ==
- 2018 Currie Cup First Division
- 2018 Rugby Challenge
