= Akker van der Merwe =

South African rugby union player

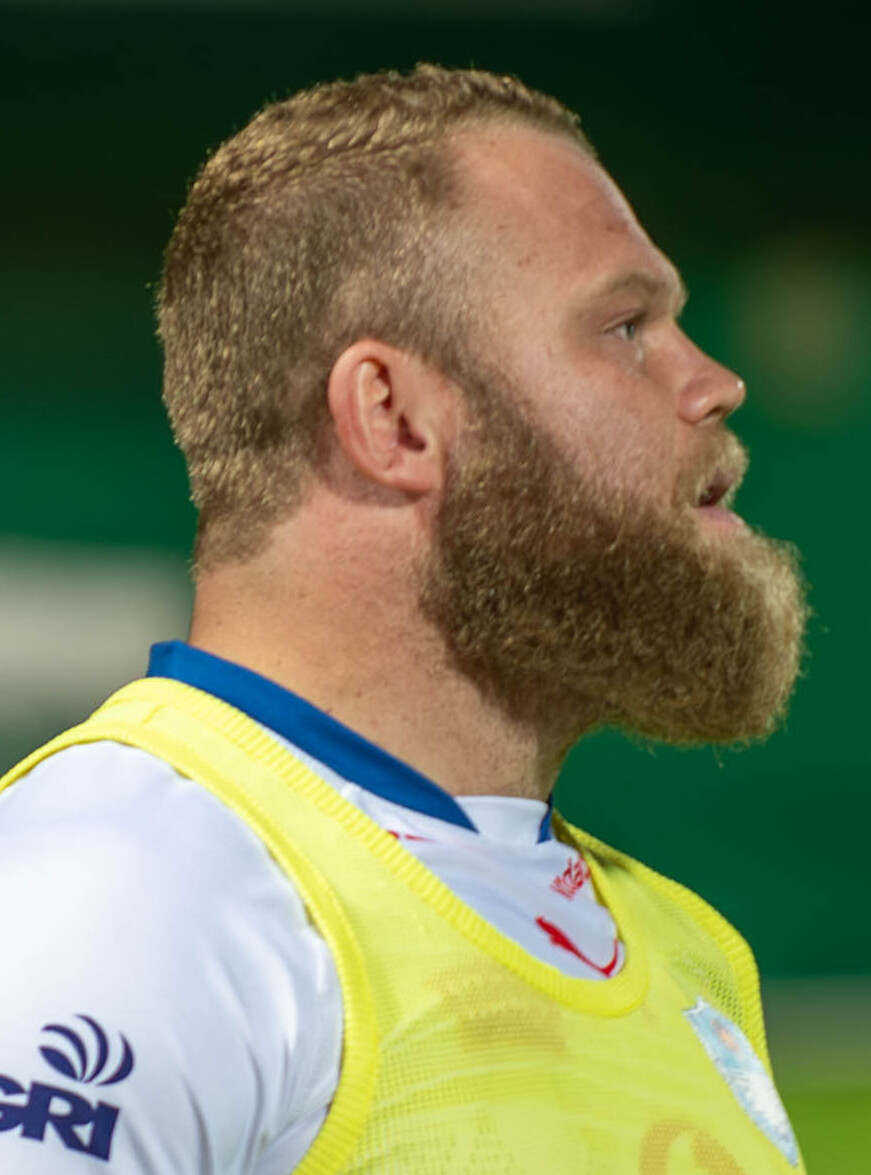
- Full name: Armand H P van der Merwe
- Born: 17 June 1991 (age 35) Vanderbijlpark, South Africa
- Height: 1.78 m (5 ft 10 in)
- Weight: 108 kg (238 lb; 17 st 0 lb)
- School: Hoërskool Outeniqua
- University: North-West University

Rugby union career
- Position: Hooker
- Current team: Blue Bulls
Youth career
- 2007–2009: SWD Eagles
- 2010: Leopards U19
- 2012: Leopards U21
Amateur team(s)
Years	Team	Apps	(Points)
2013	NWU Pukke	10	(15)
Senior career
Years	Team	Apps	(Points)
2013	Leopards XV	6	(10)
2013–2014	Leopards	11	(0)
2014–2017	Lions	50	(35)
2014–2016	Golden Lions	18	(25)
2015	→ Racing 92	2	(0)
2017	Golden Lions XV	3	(15)
2017–2018	Sharks (Currie Cup)	15	(10)
2018–2019	Sharks	23	(30)
2019–2023	Sale Sharks	70	(155)
2023–	Bulls	7	(30)
- Correct as of 06 December 2023
International career
Years	Team	Apps	(Points)
2016–2017	Barbarians	4	(10)
2018	South Africa	3	(0)
- Correct as of 16 June 2018

Armand H P "Akker" van der Merwe (born 17 June 1991) is a South African professional rugby union player for South African United Rugby Championship side Bulls. His regular position is hooker.

== Career ==
=== Youth ===
Although born in Vanderbijlpark, Van der Merwe grew up in George, where he played rugby for Outeniqua High School to win inclusion in the SWD Eagles Under-16 side for the 2007 Grant Khomo Week and their Under-18 side for the 2008 Academy Week and 2009 Craven Week competitions.

In 2010, he moved to Potchefstroom where he represented the Leopards and university side NWU Pukke. He was a regular for the Leopards U19 side during the 2010 Under-19 Provincial Championship competition, making thirteen appearances and in 2012, he made twelve appearances for the Leopards U21 side in the 2012 Under-21 Provincial Championship, scoring six tries.

He played Varsity Cup rugby for the NWU Pukke in 2013 and 2014. He made eight appearances and scored three tries in the 2014 competition, helping his side to the final, where they lost 39–33 to the UCT Ikey Tigers, with Van der Merwe scoring a try early in the second half.

=== Leopards ===
His senior debut came in 2013, when he was included in the senior Leopards XV side for the 2013 Vodacom Cup competition. He made his debut against the Golden Lions in Johannesburg, coming on as an early substitute. He also marked the occasion by scoring a try in injury time at the end of the match. Two more starts and three more substitute appearances (and one more try) followed during that competition.

His Currie Cup debut came in July 2013. He came on as a substitute on the hour mark at Olën Park in their 2013 Currie Cup First Division match against the eventual champions, the Pumas. While mainly being used as a substitute during the campaign (playing off the bench on eight occasions), he did one start in the competition against the Boland Cavaliers.

He made a further two appearances for the Leopards during the 2014 Currie Cup qualification tournament.

=== Lions ===
In April 2014, Van der Merwe was a surprise inclusion in the Lions touring squad for their Australian leg of the 2014 Super Rugby season. He made his Super Rugby debut against the Chiefs in Hamilton and scored his first try for the Lions in their next match against the Highlanders in Dunedin. After one more match that he played off the bench (against the Waratahs in Sydney), he made his first Super Rugby start in their final tour match against the Force in Perth.

His performances for the Lions in Super Rugby also led to a domestic move, with Van der Merwe joining the Golden Lions on a deal for the 2014 Currie Cup Premier Division competition.

On 4 April 2015, he scored a last-minute winning in their 2015 Super Rugby season match against the Bulls to help the Lions win the match 22–18 against their trans-Jukskei rivals. He made 15 total appearances for the club during this season.

He joined Racing 92 on a short-term deal for the start of their 2015–16 Top 14 season. He played two games in total for Racing, against Grenoble and Oyonnax. Van der Merwe then returned to the Lions for the start of the 2016 Super Rugby Season, scoring 5 tries during the course of the season as the Lions reached their first ever Super Rugby final. He came off the bench in the Lions loss to the Hurricanes.

At the conclusion of the 2017 Super Rugby Season Van der Merwe again came off the bench in the final, which saw the Lions defeated by the Crusaders.

=== Sharks ===
Prior to the start of the 2018 Super Rugby Season he moved to the Durban-based Sharks franchise on a two-year contract. In his inaugural season he made 15 appearances and scored 2 tries. Van der Merwe started at hooker as the Sharks fell to the Crusaders at the quarter-finals stage of the competition. He also scored a try in the 2018 Currie Cup final, which saw the Sharks win their first Currie Cup title for 5 years.

He made only 8 appearances for the Sharks during the 2019 Super Rugby Season. The most notable event of the season came during a Sharks home game against the Bulls, which saw Van der Merwe sent off following an altercation with Springbok hooker Schalk Brits. He received a three-week playing ban following the incident.

=== Sale Sharks ===
Following the conclusion of his contract with the Sharks, Van der Merwe joined Premiership Rugby side Sale Sharks on a three-year contract. Sale Sharks announced in June 2023 that he had agreed early release from his contract and would be leaving the club with immediate effect and return to South Africa.

=== Bulls ===
In July 2023 the Bulls confirmed he had agreed a three-year contract until 2026.

== Honours ==
- Super Rugby runner-up: 2016, 2017
- Currie Cup champion: 2018
- Premiership Rugby Cup champion: 2019-20
- Named in the 2023–24 United Rugby Championship Elite XV team

== Personal ==
He is the older brother of Scotland international and British and Irish Lions winger Duhan van der Merwe, who also played Craven Week rugby for SWD Eagles and was included in the South African Schools sides in 2012 and 2013.
