= Nardus van der Walt =

South African rugby union player

- Full name: Hendrik Bernardus van der Walt
- Born: 22 February 1992 (age 34) Rustenburg, South Africa
- Height: 1.89 m (6 ft 2 1/2 in)
- Weight: 100 kg (15 st 10 lb; 220 lb)
- School: Afrikaanse Hoër Seunskool, Pretoria

Rugby union career
- Position: Flanker / Number eight
- Current team: Aurillac
Youth career
- 2009–2013: Blue Bulls
Amateur team(s)
Years	Team	Apps	(Points)
2013	UP Tuks	1	(0)
Senior career
Years	Team	Apps	(Points)
2013–2015	Blue Bulls	15	(20)
2015	Bulls	0	(0)
2015	Griquas	7	(0)
2016–2018	Pumas	31	(20)
2017–2018	→ Munakata Sanix Blues	7	(0)
2018–present	Aurillac	0	(0)
- Correct as of 27 October 2018
International career
Years	Team	Apps	(Points)
2010	S.A. Under-18 High Performance		
- Correct as of 4 February 2015

Hendrik Bernardus van der Walt (born 22 February 1992) is a South African professional rugby union player for Aurillac in the Rugby Pro D2 in France. His regular position is flanker or number eight.

== Career ==
=== Youth and Varsity Cup rugby ===
Van der Walt went to Afrikaanse Hoër Seunskool in Pretoria, where he earned a selection into the Blue Bulls side that played at the Under-18 Craven Week competitions in both 2009 and 2010. In 2010, he was also selected in a South African Under-18 High Performance squad that played matches against Namibia, France and England.

Van der Walt appeared in eleven of the Blue Bulls U19 team's matches during the 2011 Under-19 Provincial Championship, helping his side reach the final of the competition, where they lost to Gauteng rivals, the Golden Lions U19.

In 2013, he made one appearance for UP Tuks in the 2013 Varsity Cup competition against NWU Pukke before moving to the Blue Bulls Vodacom Cup squad. He made ten appearances for the Blue Bulls U21 side in the 2013 Under-21 Provincial Championship, once again finishing as a losing finalist.

=== Blue Bulls ===
Van der Walt made his first class debut during the 2013 Vodacom Cup competition, starting in their 40–32 victory over Griquas in Kimberley. He played in all seven of their round-robin matches, scoring his first senior try in their 110–0 victory over the Limpopo Blue Bulls in Lephalale and scoring a brace in their next match against the Griffons, with his first try coming in the seventh minute of the match to set the Blue Bulls on their way to achieving an 89–10 win.

Van der Walt then spent some time playing sevens rugby, representing South Africa Sevens Academy side Samurai at the 7s Premier League competition and at an invitational tournament in Dubai and the Blue Bulls at the 2014 World Club 7s in England.

Van der Walt was named in the Bulls squad prior to the 2015 Super Rugby season.

=== Griquas ===
Van der Walt joined Kimberley-based side Griquas prior to the 2015 Currie Cup qualification series, signing a deal until October 2015.

=== Pumas ===
Van der Walt moved back north for the 2016 season, joining Nelspruit-based outfit the Pumas.

=== Aurillac ===
Van der Walt moved to French Pro D2 side Aurillac after the 2018 Currie Cup Premier Division.
