= Hennie Skorbinski =

South African rugby union player

- Full name: Alfred Henry Skorbinski
- Born: 25 September 1990 (age 36) Port Elizabeth, South Africa
- Height: 1.85 m (6 ft 1 in)
- Weight: 100 kg (15 st 10 lb; 220 lb)
- School: Framesby High School
- University: North-West University

Rugby union career
- Position: Centre
Youth career
- 2010–2011: Leopards
Amateur team(s)
Years	Team	Apps	(Points)
2011–2013	NWU Pukke	12	(5)
Senior career
Years	Team	Apps	(Points)
2011–2013	Leopards	18	(15)
2013	Leopards XV	2	(5)
2014–2018	Pumas	59	(72)
- Correct as of 27 October 2018

Alfred Henry Skorbinski (born 25 September 1990 in Port Elizabeth) is a South African rugby union player that played first class rugby for the Leopards from 2011 to 2013 and for the Pumas from 2014 to 2018. His regular position was centre.

He suffered a shoulder injury towards the end of the 2018 Currie Cup and announced his retirement from the sport.

== Career ==
=== Youth and Varsity rugby ===
He played for the Leopards U21 side in the 2010 and 2011 Under-21 Provincial Championship competitions. He also represented university side NWU Pukke in the Varsity Cup competition in 2011, 2012 and 2013.

=== Leopards ===
His first class debut for the Leopards came during the 2011 Currie Cup Premier Division season, coming on as a substitute for the Leopards in their match against the Sharks in Durban. Two more substitute appearances followed in the Leopards' next matches against the Blue Bulls and the Free State Cheetahs and he started the next two matches, against Western Province and the Golden Lions.

Following the Leopards' relegation from the Premier Division that season, he played in the Leopards' final five matches the next year in the 2012 Currie Cup First Division competition, scoring his first senior try in the match against the Border Bulldogs in East London.

In 2013, he played Vodacom Cup rugby for the first time, making two appearances. He scored two tries in the opening two matches of the 2013 Currie Cup First Division, eventually making eight starts in that competition.

=== Pumas ===
At the end of the 2013 season, it was announced that Skorbinski joined Nelspruit-based side Pumas for the 2014 season. He was a member of the Pumas side that won the Vodacom Cup for the first time in 2015, beating Western Province 24–7 in the final. Skorbinski made a single appearances during the season and scored one try.
