= AJ Coertzen =

South African rugby union player

- Full name: Adriaan Jacobus Van der Berg Coertzen
- Born: 16 October 1990 (age 36) Bethlehem, South Africa
- Height: 1.85 m (6 ft 1 in)
- Weight: 85 kg (13 st 5 lb; 187 lb)
- School: Grey College, Bloemfontein
- University: University of the Free State

Rugby union career
- Position: Winger / Fullback
- Current team: Aurillac
Youth career
- 2006–2011: Free State Cheetahs
Amateur team(s)
Years	Team	Apps	(Points)
2014–2015	UFS Shimlas	12	(11)
Senior career
Years	Team	Apps	(Points)
2011–2015	Free State Cheetahs	10	(5)
2015–2018	Griquas	62	(170)
2017–2018	Cheetahs	5	(0)
2018–present	Aurillac	0	(0)
- Correct as of 27 October 2018

Adriaan Jacobus Van der Berg Coertzen (born 16 October 1990 in Bethlehem, South Africa) is a South African rugby union player for Aurillac in the Rugby Pro D2 in France. His regular position is winger or fullback.

== Career ==
=== Youth rugby ===
Playing his high school rugby at Grey College in Bloemfontein, Coertzen was selected in the Free State squad that played at the Under-16 Grant Khomo Week tournament in 2006. In 2008, he was a member of the Free State's Under-18 Academy Week team. He progressed to the Free State U19 side that played in the 2009 Under-19 Provincial Championship and then played for the Free State U21 side in the 2011 Under-21 Provincial Championship.

=== Free State Cheetahs ===
Coertzen made his first class debut in the 2011 Vodacom Cup. He was an unused substitute in their match against the Pumas in Ermelo, but made his debut the following week at home to the Leopards, coming on as a substitute during the second half of their 38–24 victory. He made his starting debut in their next match against Namibian side the Welwitschias in Windhoek and took just two minutes to open the scoring to set the Cheetahs on their way to a 29–13 victory. One more start followed in their next match against the Blue Bulls, but that turned out to be his last involvement with the first team for 3 years, instead playing club and Varsity Cup rugby with the UFS Shimlas.

In August 2014, Coertzen was a surprise inclusion for the Free State Cheetahs in their opening match of the 2014 Currie Cup Premier Division season against newcomers the Pumas.

=== Griquas ===
After spending the 2015 Currie Cup qualification series on loan at Kimberley-based side Griquas – making six appearances – he signed for them on a permanent basis for the 2016 season.

=== Aurillac ===
Coertzen moved to French Pro D2 side Aurillac after the 2018 Currie Cup Premier Division.
