= Bandisa Ndlovu =

South African rugby union player

- Born: 12 October 1996 (age 30) Estcourt, South Africa
- Height: 1.80 m (5 ft 11 in)
- Weight: 101 kg (223 lb; 15 st 13 lb)
- School: Voortrekker High School, Pietermaritzburg

Rugby union career
- Position: Flank / Prop
- Current team: Griffons (rugby union)
Youth career
- -: Sharks
Senior career
| Years | Team | Apps | (Points) |
| 2017 | Sharks XV | 3 | (0) |
| 2017 | Sharks (Currie Cup) | 1 | (5) |
| 2018–2019 | Bayonne | 7 | (5) |
| 2019 | Sharks XV | 1 | (5) |
| 2020 | Griquas | 3 | (0) |
| 2021 | Griffons | 7 | (0) |
- Correct as of 27 March 2022

Bandisa Ndlovu (born 12 October 1996) is a South African rugby union player for the Griffons (rugby union) in the Currie Cup and in the Rugby Challenge. He can play as a prop or a flank.
