= Francois Kleinhans =

South African rugby union player

- Born: 7 January 1991 (age 35) Durban, South Africa
- Height: 1.84 m (6 ft 1/2 in)
- Weight: 96 kg (15 st 2 lb; 212 lb)
- School: Glenwood High

Rugby union career
- Position: Flanker / No 8
- Current team: Pumas
Youth career
- 2007–2012: Sharks
Senior career
Years	Team	Apps	(Points)
2011–2016	Sharks XV	30	(15)
2011–2016	Sharks (Currie Cup)	24	(25)
2017–present	Pumas	38	(45)
- Correct as of 10 July 2022
International career
Years	Team	Apps	(Points)
2011	South Africa Under-20	3	(5)
- Correct as of 18 April 2015

Francois Kleinhans is a South African rugby union player for the Pumas in the Currie Cup and in the Rugby Challenge. He can operate as a flanker or eighthman. He also played for South Africa Under 20 in the 2011 IRB Junior World Championship.
