= Ivan van Zyl =

South Africa international rugby union player

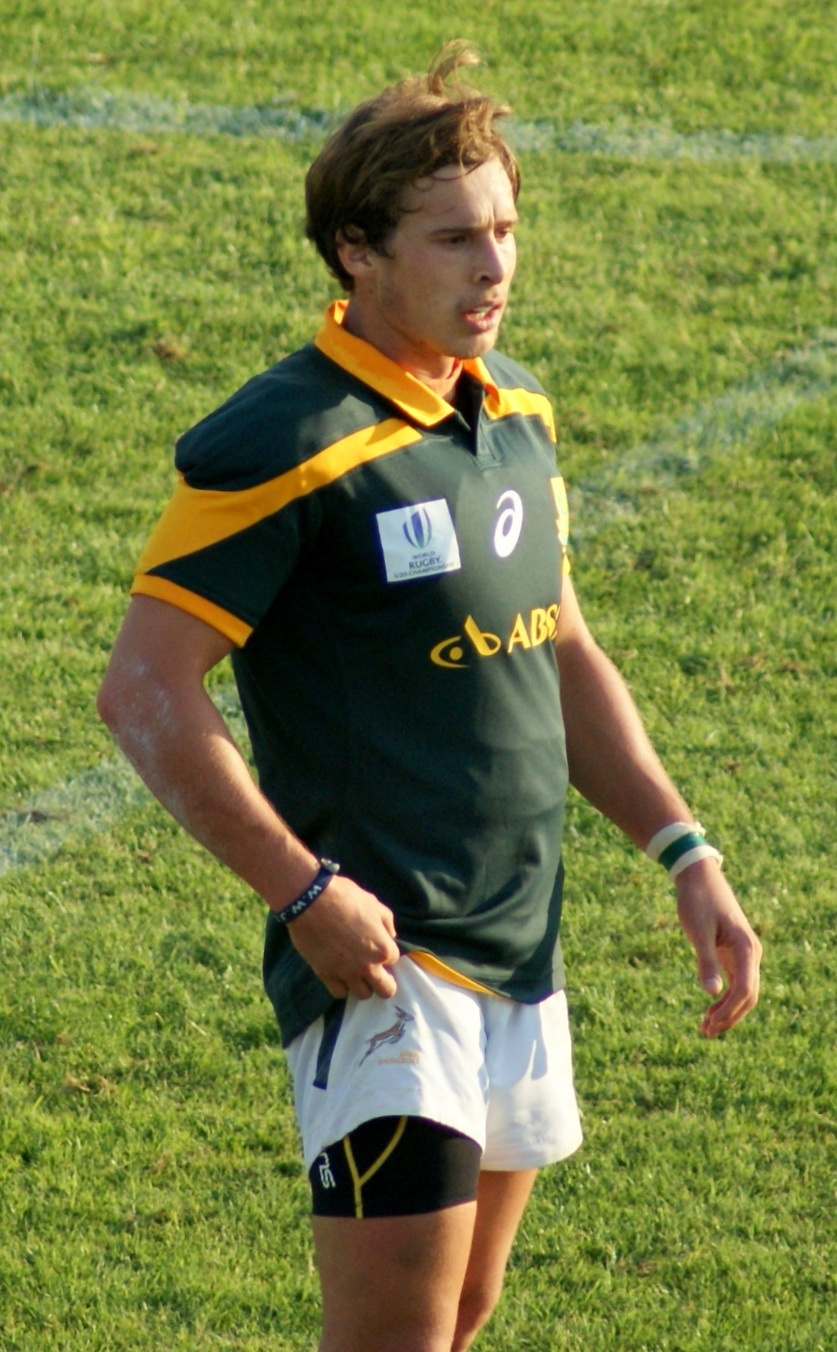
- Van Zyl during the third place final of 2015 World Rugby Under 20 Championship in Cremona (Italy).
- Born: 30 June 1995 (age 31) Pretoria, South Africa
- Height: 1.80 m (5 ft 11 in)
- Weight: 82 kg (12 st 13 lb; 181 lb)
- School: Afrikaanse Hoër Seunskool

Rugby union career
- Position: Scrum-half
- Current team: Saracens
Youth career
- 2008–2016: Blue Bulls
Senior career
Years	Team	Apps	(Points)
2015–2021	Blue Bulls	41	(30)
2015–2018	Blue Bulls XV	17	(20)
2016–2021	Bulls	46	(20)
2021–	Saracens	100	(75)
- Correct as of 24 May 2025
International career
Years	Team	Apps	(Points)
2015	South Africa Under-20	5	(0)
2018	South Africa	6	(0)
- Correct as of 21 July 2019

Ivan van Zyl (born 30 June 1995) is a South African rugby union player for Saracens. His regular position is scrum-half.

== Career ==
=== Youth ===
Van Zyl represented the Blue Bulls as early as primary school level, appearing at the Under-13 Craven Week competition in 2008. In July 2013, he also played for them at the premier South African high school rugby competition, the Under-18 Craven Week held in Polokwane. He made three appearances and scored two tries in a personal haul of 25 points.

Van Zyl joined the Blue Bulls Academy after finishing high school and represented the Blue Bulls U19 side in the 2014 Under-19 Provincial Championship, starting ten matches and making two substitute appearances as they reached the final of the competition, where they were defeated 26–33 by Western Province U19.

=== Under-20 ===
Van Zyl was named in a 37-man training squad for the South Africa national under-20 rugby union team and featured for them in a friendly match against a Varsity Cup Dream Team in April 2015. He was also included in the squad that embarked on a two-match tour of Argentina. He came on as a replacement in their 25–22 victory over Argentina and started their 39–28 victory a few days later.

Upon the team's return, Van Zyl was named in the final squad for the 2015 World Rugby Under 20 Championship. He started all three of their matches in Pool B of the competition; a 33–5 win against hosts Italy, a 40–8 win against Samoa and a 46–13 win over Australia to help South Africa finish top of Pool B to qualify for the semi-finals with the best record pool stage of all the teams in the competition. Van Zyl started their semi-final match against England, but could not prevent them losing 20–28 to be eliminated from the competition by England for the second year in succession and also started their third-place play-off match against France, helping South Africa to a 31–18 win to secure third place in the competition.

=== Senior level ===
Van Zyl made his first class debut for the Blue Bulls on 6 March 2015, starting their 2015 Vodacom Cup match against the Falcons in Kempton Park, helping them to a 37–13 victory. He also started their next three matches in the competition, against the Leopards XV, Golden Lions and Pumas.

In June 2015, Van Zyl extended his contract at the Bulls until October 2017. He was included in the Blue Bulls squad for the 2015 Currie Cup Premier Division and named in the matchday squad for all eleven of their matches in the competition. He made his Currie Cup debut by playing off the bench in their 57–19 victory against the Free State Cheetahs in Bloemfontein in their opening match of the season. After appearing as a replacement in their next two matches against Griquas and Western Province, he made his first Currie Cup start in their Round Four match against the Free State Cheetahs in Pretoria. He appeared as a replacement in five of their remaining six matches during the regular season of the season, helping the Blue Bulls finish in second position to qualify for the play-offs. He played off the bench in their semi-final match against Western Province, but could not prevent the side from Cape Town winning 23–18 to eliminate the Blue Bulls from the competition.

In 2016, Van Zyl was included in the Bulls' squad for the 2016 Super Rugby season.

On 23 February 2021, Van Zyl signed for Saracens ahead of the 2021–22 season. He helped Saracens win the Premiership title in 2023, scoring a try in the final as Saracens defeated Sale Sharks.

=== Springbok debut ===
Van Zyl made his Test debut for the senior Springboks on 2 June 2018 against Wales in Washington, D.C. at the age of 22 years.

== Honours ==
- Super Rugby Unlocked winner 2020
- Currie Cup winner 2020–21
- Pro14 Rainbow Cup runner-up 2021
- Premiership Rugby runner up 2021-22
- Premiership Rugby winner 2022-23
