= Hacjivah Dayimani =

South African rugby union player

- Full name: Hacjivah Graham Dayimani
- Born: 23 September 1997 (age 29) Cape Town, Western Cape, South Africa
- Height: 1.88 m (6 ft 2 in)
- Weight: 106 kg (234 lb; 16 st 10 lb)
- School: Jeppe High School for Boys

Rugby union career
- Position: Flanker
- Current team: Racing 92
Youth career
- 2013–2018: Golden Lions
Senior career
Years	Team	Apps	(Points)
2017–2019	Golden Lions XV	10	(30)
2017–2021	Golden Lions	23	(40)
2018–2021	Lions	32	(15)
2021–2024	Western Province	9	(20)
2021–2024	Stormers	57	(35)
2024–	Racing 92	16	(10)
- Correct as of 18 April 2025
International career
Years	Team	Apps	(Points)
2015	South African Schools		
- Correct as of 22 May 2018
Medal record
Boy's rugby sevens
Representing South Africa
Commonwealth Youth Games
Gold medal – first place	2015 Apia	Team competition

Hacjivah Graham Dayimani (born 23 September 1997) is a South African rugby union player for the DHL Stormers in the URC.. His regular position is number eight or flanker.

== Personal life ==
Dayimani is Jewish. He is the son of an Igbo Jewish Nigerian father and a Xhosa South African mother. His late father was a devout Jew who observed Shabbat, while his mother is a Sangoma (a traditional African healer). His surname means "diamond" in Xhosa while his first name was chosen because it is a combination of the Hebrew name "Akiva" and the Xhosa "Mpumelelo" which means 'achiever'.

== Career ==
After several seasons with the Lions and the Stormers, in 2024 he signs in France for 2 seasons with the french club Racing 92.
