= André Warner =

South African rugby union player

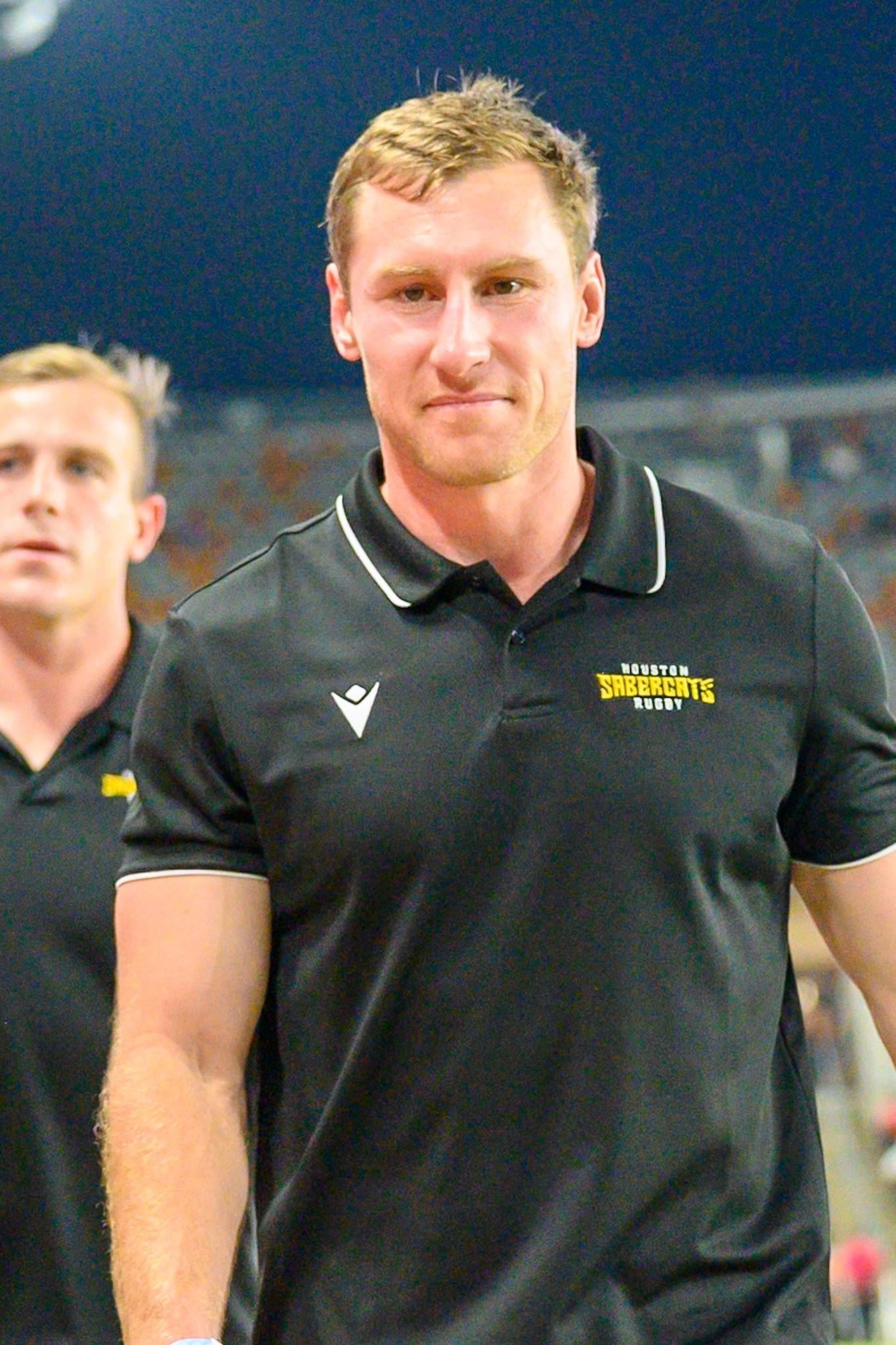
- Full name: André Riaan Warner
- Born: 2 September 1993 (age 33) Cape Town, South Africa
- Height: 1.84 m (6 ft 1/2 in)
- Weight: 85 kg (13 st 5 lb; 187 lb)
- School: Hoërskool Tygerberg, Cape Town
- University: University of Pretoria

Rugby union career
- Position: Scrum-half
- Current team: Lions / Golden Lions
Youth career
- 2011–2012: Western Province
- 2013–2014: Blue Bulls
Amateur team(s)
Years	Team	Apps	(Points)
2015–2017	UP Tuks	16	(23)
Senior career
Years	Team	Apps	(Points)
2015–2019	Blue Bulls	25	(20)
2016–2019	Blue Bulls XV	24	(40)
2017–2019	Bulls	20	(15)
2018–2019	→ Stade Français	5	(5)
2020–2023	Lions	33	(35)
2020–2023	Golden Lions	18	(15)
- Correct as of 13 June 2023

André Riaan Warner (born 2 September 1993) is a South African professional rugby union player for the Lions in the United Rugby Championship and the Golden Lions in the Currie Cup. His regular position is scrum-half.

== Career ==
=== Youth / Western Province ===
In July 2011, Warner was included in the Western Province side that participated at the premier high school rugby union competition in South Africa, the Under-18 Craven Week tournament held in Kimberley. He scored two tries in the competition, one in each of their matches against Border and the Pumas.

In 2012, he was included in the Western Province U21 squad that competed in the 2012 Under-19 Provincial Championship. He scored a try in his first appearance for the side in a 23–13 victory over the Golden Lions U21s, eventually making six appearances for a Western Province side that made it all the way to the final of the competition, where they lost to the Blue Bulls U21.

=== Blue Bulls / UP Tuks ===
Warner made the move to Pretoria in 2013 to join the Blue Bulls. However, he had limited playing time for the Blue Bulls U21 at age-group level – in 2012, he was named on the bench on one occasion during the Under-21 Provincial Championship, but failed to appear, and in 2013, he made just one start and two appearances off the bench, contributing a try in their 37–10 victory over the Leopards U21s in Potchefstroom.

Warner was included in the UP Tuks squad for the 2015 Varsity Cup and was the number one choice fly-half for the university side, starting all eight of their matches in the competition and again scoring a try in Potchefstroom in their match against the NWU Pukke. His appearances consisted of seven matches in the round-robin stage of the tournament of which UP Tuks won them all to qualify to the semi-finals, as well as their semi-final defeat to the NWU Pukke, losing 28–29 to miss out on a home semi-final.

Less than two weeks after his final Vartisy Cup match, Warner also made his first class debut. He started their Round Five match against Namibian side Welwitschias in Windhoek and helped the Blue Bulls to a 44–0 victory. He also featured in their 40–21 win over the Griffons in Pretoria and their 83–13 defeat of the Limpopo Blue Bulls. Warner missed out on the Blue Bulls' play-off matches in the competition, as he was included in the Bulls' Super Rugby squad for their tour to Australia and New Zealand, but failed to get any game-time during the tour.

Warner was included in the Blue Bulls' senior squad for the 2015 Currie Cup Premier Division and was named as the scrum-half replacement for their Round Four match against Griquas in Kimberley.
