= Louis Albertse =

South African rugby union player

- Full name: Louis Erasmus Albertse
- Born: 2 April 1990 (age 36) Ermelo, South Africa
- Height: 1.81 m (5 ft 11 1/2 in)
- Weight: 100 kg (220 lb; 15 st 10 lb)
- School: Michaelhouse, KwaZulu-Natal
- University: University of Johannesburg

Rugby union career
- Position: Prop
Youth career
- 2007: KwaZulu-Natal Country Districts
- 2008: KwaZulu-Natal
- 2009–2011: Golden Lions
Senior career
Years	Team	Apps	(Points)
2012–2013	Blue Bulls	6	(0)
2013–2016	Aix / Provence Rugby	39	(0)
2016	Southern Kings	2	(0)
2016	Eastern Province Kings	9	(0)
2016–2018	Pumas	12	(0)
- Correct as of 16 July 2018

Louis Erasmus Albertse (born 2 April 1990 in Ermelo, South Africa) is a South African rugby union player who last played for the Pumas in the Currie Cup and in the Rugby Challenge. His regular position is tighthead prop.

== Rugby career ==
=== 2007–2008 : KwaZulu Natal ===
Albertse grew up in KwaZulu-Natal and earned his first provincial selection in 2007, when he represented KwaZulu-Natal Country Districts at the Under-18 Academy Week. In 2008, he was selected by KwaZulu-Natal for the premier high school rugby union tournament in South Africa, the Under-18 Craven Week held in Pretoria, where he started in all three their matches.

=== 2009–2011 : Golden Lions ===
After high school, Albertse moved to Johannesburg where he joined the Golden Lions academy. He was a key member of Golden Lions U19 that participated in the 2009 Under-19 Provincial Championship. He started five of their matches in the regular season and appeared as a replacement in the other, helping the Golden Lions finish in fourth position on the log to qualify for the semi-finals. He started their 32–30 victory over Blue Bulls U19 in the semi-final, as well as the final, which Free State U19 won 45–13 in Pretoria.

In 2010, he made four starts and three appearances off the bench for Golden Lions U21 in the Group A of the 2010 Under-21 Provincial Championship in a disappointing season that saw them finish in sixth position and missing out on the play-offs. He was named in their squad for the 2011 Under-21 Provincial Championship, but failed to make any appearances in the competition.

=== 2012–2013 : Blue Bulls ===
Albertse moved to Pretoria to join the Blue Bulls prior to the 2012 season. He was named in their 2012 Vodacom Cup squad, but didn't appear in any matches. He was once again named in their squad for the 2013 Vodacom Cup and he made his first class debut by playing off the bench in their opening match of the competition, a 40–32 victory over Griquas in Kimberley. After more appearances off the bench in matches against the Pumas, Golden Lions, Falcons and the Limpopo Blue Bulls, he made his first senior start in an 89–10 victory over the Griffons in their final match of the regular season. The Blue Bulls finished in second position on the Northern Section log to qualify for the quarter-finals, but Albertse didn't feature in their 31–34 defeat to the Eastern Province Kings.

=== 2013–2016 : Aix / Provence ===
Albertse then moved to France, where he joined a Pays d'Aix side that was newly relegated to the third-tier Fédérale 1 for the 2013–2014 season. He made his debut for them by playing off the bench in their 10–24 defeat to CS Vienne. After another appearance as a replacement against SO Chambéry, he made his first start in a defeat to US Annecy in their next match. He eventually made nine starts and a further eight substitute appearances as Aix finished in third position in Pool 2 of the competition. He started the second leg of their Last 16 play-off fixtures against FC Oloron, helping them progress on aggregate despite a 17–25 defeat. He played in both legs of their quarter-final against RC Massy, but could not prevent them losing 50–61 on aggregate to be eliminated from the finals.

Aix had a much-improved season in 2014–15, winning fifteen of their eighteen matches in Pool 4 of the competition to qualify for the finals for the second season in succession. Albertse was once again a regular player, featuring in eleven of their matches during the regular season. He started the second leg of their Last 16 match against Montluçon Rugby, helping them progress 45–29 on aggregate and then helped them go one step further that in 2013–2014 by winning their quarter-final tie against RC Aubenas; Albertse played in the second leg of a 48–43 aggregate victory. He also played in their 27–12 victory over SO Chambéry, where Aix overturned a 10–24 defeat in the first leg to win 37–36 on aggregate, and in the final, where he came on as a replacement on the hour mark to help Aix secure a 12–6 victory to win the championship and gain promotion to the 2015–2016 Pro D2.

Aix changed their name to Provence Rugby shortly after securing promotion and Albertse made seven appearances for the team in the Rugby Pro D2 competition. In February 2016, Albertse played his last match for Provence, helping them to a 30–16 victory over Aurillac before leaving the club to return to South Africa. He made a total of 39 appearances for the team, without scoring any tries during his time there.

=== 2016 : Southern Kings ===
Upon his return to South Africa, Albertse joined the Port Elizabeth-based Super Rugby franchise the Southern Kings for a trial period and a week later, he was included on the bench for their opening match of the 2016 Super Rugby season against the Sharks.
