= Juarno Augustus =

South African rugby union player

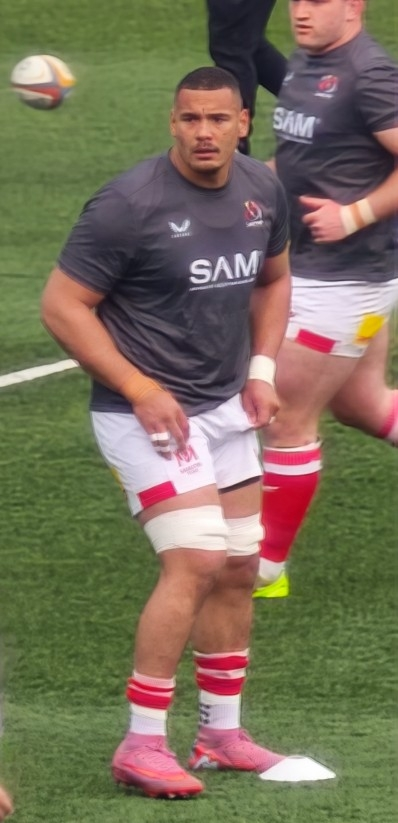
- A photo of professional rugby player Juarno Augustus warming up for Ulster before a match against the Stormers on 8 May 2026
- Full name: Juarno Marc-quin Augustus
- Born: 9 December 1997 (age 28) Alexander Bay, South Africa
- Height: 1.845 m (6 ft 1/2 in)
- Weight: 119 kg (262 lb; 18 st 10 lb)
- School: Hoërskool Tygerberg

Rugby union career
- Position: No 8
- Current team: Ulster Rugby
Youth career
- 2015–2018: Western Province
Senior career
Years	Team	Apps	(Points)
2017–2021	Stormers	21	(25)
2017–2021	Western Province	18	(40)
2021–2025	Northampton Saints	81	(110)
2025-	Ulster	21	(15)
- Correct as of 31 October 2026
International career
Years	Team	Apps	(Points)
2017	South Africa Under-20	5	(35)
- Correct as of 18 April 2018

Juarno 'Trokkie' Marc-quin Augustus (born 9 December 1997) is a South African rugby union player for Ulster Rugby in the United Rugby Championship, playing at number 8. He formerly played for the Stormers in Super Rugby, Western Province in the Currie Cup and in the Rugby Challenge, and Northampton Saints in the Premiership. Augustus has joined Ulster on a 3-year contract starting from the 2025/26 season.
