= Ruben van Heerden =

South African rugby union player

- Born: 27 October 1997 (age 29) Alberton, South Africa
- Height: 2.00 m (6 ft 6 1/2 in)
- Weight: 124 kg (273 lb; 19 st 7 lb)
- School: Afrikaanse Hoër Seunskool, Pretoria

Rugby union career
- Position: Lock
- Current team: Montpellier Hérault Rugby
Youth career
- 2013–2018: Blue Bulls
Senior career
Years	Team	Apps	(Points)
2016–2018	Blue Bulls XV	17	(15)
2017–2018	Bulls	5	(0)
2017–2018	Blue Bulls	14	(15)
2018–2022	Sharks (Currie Cup)	15	(0)
2019–2022	Sharks	42	(5)
2022–2023	Exeter Chiefs	14	(25)
2022–2026	Stormers	69	(10)
2023–2026	Western Province	5	(10)
2026–	Montpellier Hérault Rugby	4	(5)
- Correct as of 23 July 2022
International career
Years	Team	Apps	(Points)
2015	South Africa U18	2	(0)
2017	South Africa U20	4	(10)
2017	South Africa 'A'	1	(0)
2026–	South Africa	1	(0)
- Correct as of 26 July 2026

Ruben van Heerden (born 27 October 1997) is a South African rugby union player. He currently plays for the South Africa national rugby union team and also Montpellier Hérault Rugby in European Top 14. he previously played for the Stormers in the United Rugby Championship and Western Province in the Currie Cup and before that for the Sharks in Super Rugby and in the Currie Cup. His regular position is lock.

Van Heerden joined the Sharks on a three-year deal prior to the 2019 season.
