= Justin Basson =

South African rugby union player (born 1994)

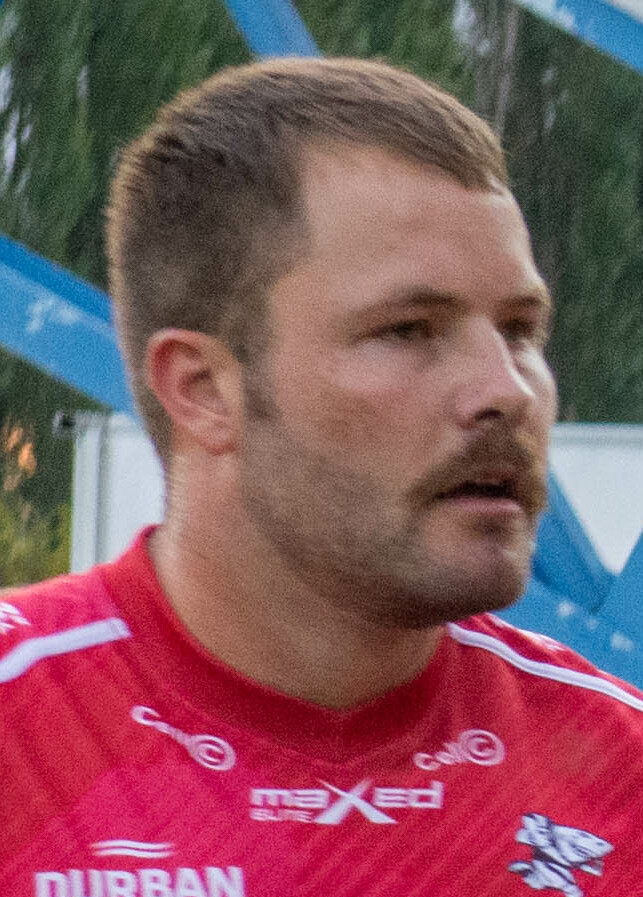
- Full name: Justin Johan Basson
- Born: 10 February 1994 (age 32) Cape Town, South Africa
- Height: 1.94 m (6 ft 4 1/2 in)
- Weight: 120 kg (18 st 13 lb; 265 lb)
- School: Hoër Landbouskool Boland, Paarl

Rugby union career
- Position: Lock
- Current team: Sharks
Youth career
- 2013: Blue Bulls
- 2014–2015: Free State Cheetahs
Amateur team(s)
Years	Team	Apps	(Points)
2016	CUT Ixias	3	(0)
Senior career
Years	Team	Apps	(Points)
2015–2018	Free State XV	28	(10)
2016–2018	Free State Cheetahs	29	(10)
2017–2019	Cheetahs	30 (Note: According to the SA Rugby Annual 2019, Basson did not feature in the 2018–19 Pro14 match against Munster. However, according to the Pro14 website, he was a used substitute in the match. This potential appearance has been included in Basson's appearance stats.)	(5)
2021	Western Province	3	(0)
2021	Stormers	1	(0)
2022–	Rugby ATL	15	(5)
2022–	Sharks	1	(0)
- Correct as of 21 June 2023

Justin Johan Basson (born 10 February 1994) is a South African rugby union player for the Sharks in the United Rugby Championship. He also plays for the Rugby ATL in Major League Rugby (MLR) in the U.S. His regular position is lock.

== Career ==
=== Blue Bulls ===
Basson was born in Cape Town. After high school, he joined the Blue Bulls Academy prior to the 2013 season. He was one of the first-choice locks for the Blue Bulls U19 side during the 2013 Under-19 Provincial Championship; after two appearances off the bench in their first two matches of the season, he started every other match, helping the Blue Bulls finish top of the log to qualify for the title play-offs. He started their 37–21 semi-final victory against the Leopards U19 and also the final, in which the Blue Bulls finished the season as champions after beating Gauteng rivals Golden Lions U19 35–23 in Durban.

He was named in a 74-man South Africa Under-20 training squad named in February 2014. However, he did not make the final squad that participated at the 2014 IRB Junior World Championship in New Zealand.

=== Free State Cheetahs ===
After just one season in Pretoria, Basson moved to Bloemfontein to join the Free State Cheetahs. He started the season playing rugby for the UFS Shimlas Young Guns, scoring a try in the final of the 2014 Varsity Cup Young Guns competition to help them win the competition for the first time.

He started nine of the Free State U21 side's thirteen matches during the 2014 Under-21 Provincial Championship and played off the bench on one occasion. He scored one of his side's eighteen tries in a 118–6 demolition of Border U21 in his second match at this level and scored another in a 43–21 victory over the Sharks U21 later in the season to help his side finish in fourth spot and clinch a title play-off spot. He didn't feature in the semi-finals as his side lost 17–41 to Western Province U21.

He was included in a Free State XV that participated in the 2015 Vodacom Cup. He made his first class debut by starting their second match of the season against Boland Cavaliers in a 52–15 victory.
