= FP Pelser =

South African rugby union player

- Full name: Floris Petrus Pelser
- Born: 30 March 1995 (age 31) Bethlehem, South Africa
- Height: 2.00 m (6 ft 6 1/2 in)
- Weight: 112 kg (247 lb; 17 st 9 lb)
- School: Hoërskool Witteberg
- University: University of Johannesburg

Rugby union career
- Position: Lock
Youth career
- 2013: Griffons
- 2014: Western Province
- 2015–2016: Golden Lions
Senior career
Years	Team	Apps	(Points)
2017–2019	Griquas	25	(15)
2019–2021	Seattle Seawolves	8	(0)
2021	Golden Lions	3	(0)
- Correct as of 16 January 2022

Floris Petrus Pelser (born 30 March 1995) is a South African rugby union player for Golden Lions in the Currie Cup and the Rugby Challenge. His regular position is lock.
