= Duncan Matthews (rugby union) =

South African rugby union player (born 1994)

- Full name: Duncan Victor Matthews
- Born: 24 February 1994 (age 32) Atlantis, South Africa
- Height: 1.82 m (5 ft 11 1/2 in)
- Weight: 88 kg (13 st 12 lb; 194 lb)
- School: Hoërskool Swartland, Malmesbury

Rugby union career
- Position: Fullback / Winger / Centre
- Current team: Seattle Seawolves
Youth career
- 2010: Boland Cavaliers
- 2013–2015: Blue Bulls
Amateur team(s)
Years	Team	Apps	(Points)
2014–2016	UP Tuks	12	(25)
Senior career
Years	Team	Apps	(Points)
2016–2018	Blue Bulls XV	13	(30)
2016–2018	Blue Bulls	16	(20)
2017–2018	Bulls	8	(15)
2019–2021	Golden Lions	8	(10)
2020–2021	Lions	2	(0)
2022–	Seattle Seawolves	34	(57)
- Correct as of 19 June 2022

Duncan Victor Matthews (born 24 February 1994) is a South African rugby union player for the Golden Lions in the Currie Cup. He also plays for the Seattle Seawolves in Major League Rugby (MLR) in the United States. He can play as a fullback, winger or centre.

== Rugby career ==
=== Youth rugby ===
Matthews was born in Atlantis and attended high school in nearby Malmesbury. From there, he was selected to represent the Boland Cavaliers at the Under-16 Grant Khomo Week in 2010, kicking 12 points with the boot in his two appearances.

=== Blue Bulls ===
After school, he moved to Pretoria to join the Blue Bulls academy. He made ten appearances for their Under-19 side during the 2013 Under-19 Provincial Championship, scoring tries in matches against Leopards U19, Golden Lions U19 and Sharks U19 during the regular season, and another one in the final to help his side win the title with a 35–23 victory over the Golden Lions.

Matthews then played for UP Tuks – the university team affiliated to the Blue Bulls academy – in the 2014 Varsity Cup, scoring tries against UCT Ikey Tigers and Maties in his four appearances. He played in eight matches for the Blue Bulls U21s in the 2014 Under-21 Provincial Championship, with tries in matches against Leopards U21 and Sharks U21 during the regular season. For the second season in a row, Matthews was the member of a title-winning team, starting the final of the competition where the Blue Bulls beat Western Province U21 20–10 in Cape Town. He was rewarded with a contract extension by the Blue Bulls, ensuring he would remain in Pretoria until October 2016.

Matthews scored a try in a 29–all draw between UP Tuks and UFS Shimlas in the 2015 Varsity Cup in one of three starts in the competition, but suffered a knee injury that kept him out of action for the majority of the season. Despite his injury, Matthews signed a further contract extension until October 2018. He returned to make a single appearance for the Blue Bulls U21s attempting to retain their Under-21 Provincial Championship title, starting a match against Eastern Province U21.

His third Varsity Cup campaign saw him score two tries – against UJ and CUT Ixias – in five starts before making his first class debut, starting in the Blue Bulls' 14–19 defeat to the Eastern Province Kings in Port Elizabeth in the 2016 Currie Cup qualification series. After a second start against the Pumas, Matthews scored his first senior try in a 38–39 defeat to Griquas in Kimberley.

== Honours ==
Seattle Sea Wolves

- All Major League Ruby Second team (2025)
