= Pieter Jansen =

South African rugby union player

- Born: 21 March 1995 (age 31) Springs, South Africa
- Height: 1.83 m (6 ft 0 in)
- Weight: 103 kg (227 lb; 16 st 3 lb)
- School: Dr E.G. Jansen, Boksburg

Rugby union career
- Position: Hooker
- Current team: Lions / Golden Lions / Golden Lions XV
Youth career
- 2008: Falcons
- 2013–2016: Golden Lions
Senior career
Years	Team	Apps	(Points)
2016–present	Golden Lions XV	34	(40)
2017–present	Golden Lions	22	(20)
2019–present	Lions	10	(0)
- Correct as of 17 March 2020

Pieter Jansen (born 21 March 1995) is a South African rugby union player for the New England Free Jacks of Major League Rugby (MLR).

He previously played for the Lions in Super Rugby, the Golden Lions in the Currie Cup and the Golden Lions XV in the Rugby Challenge. His regular position is hooker.
