= Marné Coetzee =

South African rugby union player

- Born: 17 September 1993 (age 33) Pretoria, South Africa
- Height: 1.80 m (5 ft 11 in)
- Weight: 121 kg (19 st 1 lb; 267 lb)
- School: Hoërskool Waterkloof, Pretoria; Glenwood High School, Durban

Rugby union career
- Position: Tighthead prop
- Current team: Cheetahs / Free State Cheetahs
Youth career
- 2009–2011: Blue Bulls
- 2012–2014: Sharks
Amateur team(s)
Years	Team	Apps	(Points)
2015	UKZN Impi	2	(0)
Senior career
Years	Team	Apps	(Points)
2015	Sharks XV	7	(0)
2015–2021	Pumas	62	(5)
2017	→ SWD Eagles	3	(0)
2021–	Cheetahs		
2022–	Free State Cheetahs	10	(0)
- Correct as of 10 July 2022
International career
Years	Team	Apps	(Points)
2011	South Africa Schools	1	(0)
2013	South Africa Under-20	4	(0)
- Correct as of 6 October 2015

Marné Coetzee (born 17 September 1993) is a South African rugby union player for the Pumas in the Currie Cup and in the Rugby Challenge. His regular position is tighthead prop.

== Career ==
=== Youth / Blue Bulls / South Africa Schools ===
At high school level, Coetzee provincially represented the Blue Bulls at the Under-19 Grant Khomo Week tournament in 2009, at the Under-18 Academy Week tournament in 2010 and at the Under-18 Craven Week tournament in 2011. After the latter tournament, he was also selected in a South Africa Schools team. He started for them in their 21–14 victory over France in Port Elizabeth.

=== Sharks / South Africa Under-20 ===
After finishing high school, Coetzee moved to Durban to join the Sharks academy. He made eight appearances for the Sharks U19 squad during the 2012 Under-19 Provincial Championship, making eight appearances for his side as they reached the semi-final of the competition, before losing 35–46 to the Blue Bulls U19s.

In 2013, Coetzee was selected in the South Africa Under-20 team that attempted to retain the IRB Junior World Championship title that they won in 2012. He played off the bench in their opening match of the competition as they beat the United States 97–0 and in their next match against England in their 31–24 victory. He started their final pool match against hosts France, helping his side to a 26–19 victory which ensured South Africa finished top of their pool and qualified to the semi-finals. He was an unused replacement as South Africa lost their semi-final match 17–18 to Wales, but once again played off the bench as South Africa clinched third spot in the competition by beating New Zealand 41–34, to win their fourth third-place play-off match in six years.

Coetzee returned to domestic action for the Sharks U21 side in the 2013 Under-21 Provincial Championship, making six appearances off the bench throughout the season. Coetzee's season ended in similar fashion as at Under-19 level the previous year, with his side reaching the semi-finals of the competition before losing to his former side, the Blue Bulls.

Coetzee again represented the Sharks U21 in the 2014 Under-21 Provincial Championship, this time making five starts for the side in a disappointing season that saw them miss out on the semi-finals by finishing in fifth spot on the log.

In 2015, Coetzee started the season by representing university side UKZN Impi in the 2015 Varsity Shield. He made two appearances for the side that went on to win the competition for the first time. He missed out on the final stages of that competition as he linked up with the Sharks XV squad for the 2015 Vodacom Cup. He made his domestic first class debut by coming on as a replacement in their 53–0 victory over the Border Bulldogs in their first match in the competition. He started their next match, a 12–32 defeat to Western Province a week later and remained in the starting line-up for the remainder of the competition, making a total of seven appearances as the Sharks XV finished sixth on the Southern Section log to miss out on the quarter-finals.

=== Pumas ===
Coetzee joined Nelspruit-based side the Pumas on loan for the 2015 Currie Cup Premier Division and made his Currie Cup debut for them by coming on as a replacement in their 20–9 home victory over the Eastern Province Kings.
