= Abongile Nonkontwana =

South African rugby union player

- Born: 10 April 1995 (age 31) Port Elizabeth, South Africa
- Height: 1.96 m (6 ft 5 in)
- Weight: 118 kg (260 lb; 18 st 8 lb)
- School: Selborne College; St. Alban's College

Rugby union career
- Position: Lock / Flanker / Number 8
- Current team: Bulls
Youth career
- 2008–2011: Border Bulldogs
- 2013–2016: Blue Bulls
Senior career
Years	Team	Apps	(Points)
2016–2018	Blue Bulls XV	27	(5)
2017	Bulls	3	(0)
2017	Blue Bulls	6	(5)
2018–2020	Free State Cheetahs	13	(5)
2018–2020	Cheetahs	16	(10)
2020–	Ealing Trailfinders	0	(0)
- Correct as of 8 September 2019
International career
Years	Team	Apps	(Points)
2012–2013	South Africa Schools	2	(0)
2014–2015	South Africa Under-20	3	(0)
- Correct as of 19 June 2015

Abongile Nonkontwana (born 10 April 1995 in Port Elizabeth, South Africa) is a South African rugby union player for Ealing Trailfinders in the RFU Championship, having previously played for the Cheetahs from 2018 to 2019. His regular position is lock, but he occasionally plays as a flanker or eighth man.

== Career ==
=== Youth ===
He represented Border at primary school level, playing for their Under-13 side at the Craven Week competition in 2008. He also played for them in the 2011 Under-16 Grant Khomo Week.

In 2012, Nonkontwana moved to Pretoria to enroll at St. Alban's College. Here, he was selected in the 2012 South African Schools side, making one appearance for them against Wales in George.

After appearing for the Blue Bulls at the Under-18 Craven Week competition in 2013, he was again selected in that season's South African Schools side, playing in their match against France.

In 2014, he was included in the South Africa Under-20 squad for the 2014 IRB Junior World Championship. He started their opening match of the competition, a 61–5 victory over Scotland, and came on as a replacement in their 33–24 win over hosts New Zealand. He didn't feature in their final pool match against Samoa and was an unused replacement in the semi-final win over New Zealand. He also didn't feature in the final, where England won the competition by beating South Africa 21–20.

In the second half of 2014, he played for the Blue Bulls U19 side in the 2014 Under-19 Provincial Championship, making eight appearances – mainly as a flanker – as his side made it all the way to the final against Western Province U19. Nonkontwana started the final, but could not prevent his side suffering a 26–33 defeat.

In 2015, he was again called up to a South Africa Under-20 training squad as preparation for the 2015 World Rugby Under 20 Championship. He started in their friendly match against a Varsity Cup Dream Team XV in April 2015 before being named in a squad to tour Argentina for a two-match warmup series. He played in both their 25–22 victory in the first match and their 39–28 victory in the second match against Argentina and was subsequently named in the final squad for the World Championship. He started their first match, a 33–5 win over hosts Italy, but did not feature in their remaining two pool matches or the semi-final defeat to England. He was named on the bench for their third-place play-off match against France, but failed to get any game time.

=== Blue Bulls ===
Nonkontwana was named in the Blue Bulls squad for the 2015 Vodacom Cup, but did not make any appearances in the competition.

In June 2015, he extended his contract at the Bulls until October 2017.

=== Ealing Trailfinders ===
On 7 September 2020, Nonkontwana travels to England to sign for Ealing Trailfinders in the RFU Championship from the 2020-21 season.
