= James Venter =

South African rugby union player

- Born: 21 August 1996 (age 30) Port Shepstone, South Africa
- Height: 1.79 m (5 ft 10 1/2 in)
- Weight: 92 kg (203 lb; 14 st 7 lb)
- School: Port Shepstone High School/Glenwood High School
- University: University of Johannesburg

Rugby union career
- Position: Flanker
- Current team: Sharks / Sharks (Currie Cup)
Youth career
- 2014: Sharks
- 2015–2017: Golden Lions
Senior career
Years	Team	Apps	(Points)
2016–2019	Golden Lions XV	21	(85)
2017–2019	Golden Lions	17	(25)
2019	Lions	2	(0)
2020–2025	Sharks (Currie Cup)	32	(5)
2020–2025	Sharks	46	(20)
2025–	Gloucester	5	(5)
- Correct as of 5 Dec 2025

James Venter (born 21 August 1996) is a South African professional rugby union player for the Sharks in Super Rugby, the Sharks in the Currie Cup and the Golden Lions XV in the Rugby Challenge. His regular position is flanker or number eight. In March 2025, it was announced that Venter would be leaving the Sharks at the end of the season to join English Premiership side Gloucester.
