= André Swarts =

South African rugby union player

- Full name: André Schalk Wessel Swarts
- Born: 11 June 1995 (age 31) Welkom, South Africa
- Height: 1.86 m (6 ft 1 in)
- Weight: 92 kg (203 lb; 14 st 7 lb)
- School: Grey College

Rugby union career
- Position: Fly-half
- Current team: Griquas
Youth career
- 2013–2015: Free State Cheetahs
Senior career
Years	Team	Apps	(Points)
2016–present	Griquas	80	(321)
2019–2020	Narbonne	7	(10)
- Correct as of 10 July 2022

André Schalk Wessel Swarts (born 11 June 1995) is a South African rugby union player for Griquas in the Currie Cup and the Rugby Challenge. His regular position is fly-half.
