= Enver Brandt =

South African rugby union player

- Born: 30 September 1991 (age 35) Bellville, South Africa
- Height: 1.83 m (6 ft 0 in)
- Weight: 87 kg (192 lb; 13 st 10 lb)
- School: President High School

Rugby union career
- Position: Wing
- Current team: Cheetahs / Free State Cheetahs
Senior career
Years	Team	Apps	(Points)
2015	Free State XV	5	(10)
2015	Griffons	8	(15)
2017–2021	Griquas	40	(170)
2021–	Cheetahs		
2022–	Free State Cheetahs	2	(0)
- Correct as of 10 July 2022

Enver Brandt (born September 30, 1991) is a South African rugby union player for Griquas in the Currie Cup and the Rugby Challenge. His regular position is wing.
