= Jeremy Jordaan =

South African rugby union player

- Born: 6 January 1991 (age 35) Bloemfontein, South Africa
- Height: 1.98 m (6 ft 6 in)
- Weight: 127 kg (280 lb; 20 st 0 lb)
- School: Hoërskool Fichardtpark
- University: University of Johannesburg

Rugby union career
- Position: Lock
- Current team: Agen
Youth career
- 2010–2011: Free State Cheetahs
- 2011–2012: Griffons
Senior career
Years	Team	Apps	(Points)
2013	Griffons	14	(10)
2016–2017	Pumas	5	(0)
2017	SWD Eagles	4	(0)
2017	Free State Cheetahs	3	(0)
2018	Griquas	1	(0)
2018	Griffons	2	(0)
2019–2020	Enisei-STM	23	(55)
2020–	Agen		
- Correct as of 21 January 2020

Jeremy Jordaan (born 6 January 1991) is a South African rugby union player for French team Agen in the Top 14. His regular position is lock.

He was announced as a player in SUA Agen on 14 January 2020.
