= AJ le Roux =

South African rugby union player

- Full name: Abraham Jacobus le Roux
- Born: 18 December 1990 (age 35) Pretoria, South Africa
- Height: 1.80 m (5 ft 11 in)
- Weight: 108 kg (17 st 0 lb; 238 lb)
- School: Hoërskool Overkruin

Rugby union career
- Position: Hooker
Youth career
- 2009–2010: Blue Bulls
- 2011: Golden Lions
Amateur team(s)
Years	Team	Apps	(Points)
2010	UP Tuks	3	(0)
2013	UJ	7	(15)
Senior career
Years	Team	Apps	(Points)
2010	Blue Bulls	2	(0)
2011	Golden Lions XV	10	(0)
2012–2013	Free State Cheetahs	7	(5)
2013–2014	Griffons	13	(25)
2014	→ Free State Cheetahs	4	(0)
2015–2019	Griquas	90	(90)
2020–2021	Pumas	5	(5)
- Correct as of 12 January 2022

Abraham Jacobus le Roux is a South African rugby union player for Griquas in the Currie Cup and in the Rugby Challenge. His usual position is hooker.

== Career ==
At youth level, he played for the Blue Bulls, where he also made his senior debut in the 2010 Vodacom Cup game against the Pumas.

He joined the Golden Lions in 2011, where he also made a few appearances for their Vodacom Cup side.

In 2012, he linked up with the Free State Cheetahs, where he made his Currie Cup debut against Griquas.

He joined near-neighbours Griffons on loan in 2013, but made the move permanent at the start of 2014. After one season in Welkom, he joined Griquas for 2015.
