= 2015 Currie Cup Premier Division =

77th season of the Currie Cup Premier Division

- Countries: South Africa
- Date: 7 August – 24 October 2015
- Champions: Golden Lions (11th title)
- Runners-up: Western Province
- Relegated: N/A
- Matches played: 43
- Tries scored: 286 (average 6.7 per match)
- Top point scorer: Marnitz Boshoff (187)
- Top try scorer: Jamba Ulengo (11)

The 2015 Currie Cup Premier Division was the 77th season in the competition since it started in 1889 and was contested from 7 August to 24 October 2015. The tournament (known as the Absa Currie Cup Premier Division for sponsorship reasons) was the top tier of South Africa's premier domestic rugby union competition.

The competition was won by the Golden Lions for the eleventh time in their history; they beat Western Province 32–24 in the final played on 24 October 2015.

== Competition rules and information ==
There were eight participating teams in the 2015 Currie Cup Premier Division.

=== Qualification ===
The six franchise 'anchor' teams automatically qualified to the 2015 Currie Cup Premier Division, as did the Pumas by virtue of finishing in the top six teams in the 2014 Currie Cup Premier Division. Griquas, who finished 7th in 2014, as well as the six teams in the 2014 Currie Cup First Division, took part in a qualification tournament to determine the final participant.

The qualification competition was won by Griquas for the second year in succession.

=== Regular season and title playoffs ===
The eight teams were divided into two sections, based on their 2014 positions. Teams in each section played each other twice over the course of the season, once at home and once away. Teams also played cross-section matches, playing one match (either home or away) against the teams in the other section.

Teams received four points for a win and two points for a draw. Bonus points were awarded to teams that scored 4 or more tries in a game, as well as to teams that lost a match by 7 points or less. Teams were ranked by points, then points difference (points scored less points conceded).

The top 4 teams qualified for the title play-offs. In the semifinals, the team that finished first had home advantage against the team that finish fourth, while the team that finished second had home advantage against the team that finished third. The winners of these semi-finals played each other in the final, at the home venue of the higher-placed team.

== Teams ==
Location of teams in 2015 Currie Cup Premier Division

=== Team Listing ===
2015 Currie Cup Premier Division teams
Team	Sponsored Name	Stadium/s	Sponsored Name
Blue Bulls	Vodacom Blue Bulls	Loftus Versfeld, Pretoria	Loftus Versfeld
Eastern Province Kings	Eastern Province Kings	Nelson Mandela Bay Stadium, Port Elizabeth	Nelson Mandela Bay Stadium
Free State Cheetahs	Toyota Free State Cheetahs	Free State Stadium, Bloemfontein	Free State Stadium
Golden Lions	Xerox Golden Lions	Ellis Park Stadium, Johannesburg	Emirates Airline Park
Griquas	ORC Griquas	Griqua Park, Kimberley	Griqua Park
Pumas	Steval Pumas	Mbombela Stadium, Mbombela	Mbombela Stadium
Sharks	Cell C Sharks	Kings Park Stadium, Durban	Growthpoint Kings Park
Western Province	DHL Western Province	Newlands Stadium, Cape Town	DHL Newlands

== Log ==
The final log of the round-robin stage of the 2015 Currie Cup Premier Division was:

2015 Currie Cup Premier Division log
Pos	Team	Pld	W	D	L	PF	PA	PD	TF	TA	TB	LB	Pts	Qualification
1	Golden Lions	10	10	0	0	430	217	+213	52	28	8	0	48	semi-finals
2	Blue Bulls	10	8	0	2	342	238	+104	41	26	7	0	39	semi-finals
3	Western Province	10	7	0	3	328	248	+80	38	27	6	1	35	semi-finals
4	Free State Cheetahs	10	3	2	5	268	320	−52	35	33	6	2	24	semi-finals
5	Sharks	10	4	1	5	261	269	−8	29	30	3	1	22	
6	Pumas	10	3	1	6	227	302	−75	23	36	1	2	17	
7	Eastern Province Kings	10	2	0	8	215	334	−119	23	42	2	2	12	
8	Griquas	10	1	0	9	219	362	−143	27	46	3	1	8	

Updated to match(es) played on 11 October 2015. Source:
Rules for classification: 4 points for a win; 2 points for a draw; 1 bonus point for a loss by seven points or less; 1 bonus point for scoring four or more tries in a match

=== Round-by-round ===
The table below shows each team's progression throughout the season. For each round, their cumulative points total is shown with the overall log position in brackets:

Team Progression – 2015 Currie Cup Premier Division
Team	R1	R2	R3	R4	R5	R6	R7	R8	R9	R10	Semi	Final
Golden Lions	5 (2nd)	10 (2nd)	15 (2nd)	20 (1st)	25 (1st)	29 (1st)	33 (1st)	38 (1st)	43 (1st)	48 (1st)	Won	Won
Blue Bulls	5 (1st)	10 (1st)	15 (1st)	20 (2nd)	24 (2nd)	25 (2nd)	25 (2nd)	29 (2nd)	34 (2nd)	39 (2nd)	Lost	—N/a
Western Province	5 (3rd)	9 (3rd)	9 (3rd)	10 (3rd)	15 (3rd)	20 (3rd)	24 (3rd)	29 (3rd)	30 (3rd)	35 (3rd)	Won	Lost
Free State Cheetahs	0 (8th)	1 (6th)	6 (5th)	10 (4th)	11 (5th)	12 (5th)	17 (4th)	18 (4th)	21 (4th)	24 (4th)	Lost	—N/a
Sharks	0 (5th)	5 (4th)	5 (6th)	9 (5th)	13 (4th)	13 (4th)	13 (5th)	14 (5th)	19 (5th)	22 (5th)	—N/a	—N/a
Pumas	4 (4th)	4 (5th)	8 (4th)	8 (6th)	9 (6th)	9 (6th)	13 (6th)	13 (6th)	16 (6th)	17 (6th)	—N/a	—N/a
Eastern Province Kings	0 (7th)	1 (7th)	2 (7th)	3 (7th)	3 (7th)	7 (7th)	7 (7th)	12 (7th)	12 (7th)	12 (7th)	—N/a	—N/a
Griquas	0 (6th)	0 (8th)	0 (8th)	1 (8th)	1 (8th)	6 (8th)	6 (8th)	8 (8th)	8 (8th)	8 (8th)	—N/a	—N/a
Key:	win	draw	loss	bye								

== Fixtures and results ==
The following matches were played for the 2015 Currie Cup Premier Division:

=== Round one ===
Defending champions Western Province began their defence of the title with a 43–19 win over qualifier Griquas in Kimberley. They ran in six tries, with South Africa Sevens international Seabelo Senatla getting two tries, while Demetri Catrakilis scored 13 points for the winning side. The Pumas won their home match against the Sharks for the second year in a row, prevailing 33–24 in Nelspruit. Both teams scored three tries, two of those from Pumas loose-forward Marnus Schoeman, with the boot of Pumas fly-half JC Roos proving decisive, kicking 18 points by successfully converting all seven of his attempts at goal. 2014 losing finalists the Golden Lions won 51–14 against the 2014 bottom side, the Eastern Province Kings. Golden Lions loose-forward Kwagga Smith scored a hat-trick of tries to help secure a four-try bonus points as early as the 16th minute of the match, while fly-half Marnitz Boshoff contributed 21 points, by successfully converting all nine kicks at goal during the match. The biggest win of the weekend came in Bloemfontein, where the Blue Bulls ran in six tries to beat the Free State Cheetahs 57–19. Blue Bulls fly-half Tian Schoeman topped the scoring charts after Round One, kicking five conversions and four penalties for a total of 22 points in the match, while scrum-half Francois Hougaard scored two tries for the Blue Bulls to send them top of the log.

7 August 2015	Griquas	19–43	Western Province	Griqua Park, Kimberley
15:30	Try: AJ le Roux 11'; Riaan Viljoen 57'; Ruhan Nel 65'; Con: Gouws Prinsloo 12' (1/1); Ntabeni Dukisa 66' (1/2)	Report; Scoreboard	Try: Nizaam Carr 8'; Seabelo Senatla 20', 52'; Dillyn Leyds 27'; Sikhumbuzo Notshe 71'; Juan de Jongh 74'; Con: Demetri Catrakilis 9', 21', 28', 53', 72' (5/5); Kurt Coleman (0/1); Pen: Demetri Catrakilis 14' (1/3); Cards: Jean Kleyn (yellow card) 24' to 34'; Rynhardt Elstadt (yellow card) 61'	Attendance: 3,500; Referee: Jaco Peyper

7 August 2015	Pumas	33–24	Sharks	Mbombela Stadium, Mbombela
18:00	Try: Stefan Watermeyer 11'; Marnus Schoeman 30', 37'; Con: JC Roos 12', 31', 38' (3/3); Pen: JC Roos 15', 24', 47', 79' (4/4)	Report; Scoreboard	Try: Lionel Cronjé 25'; Heimar Williams 41'; Dan du Preez 63'; Con: Joe Pietersen 26', 42', 64' (3/3); Pen: Joe Pietersen 72' (1/1)	Attendance: 4,750; Referee: Jaco van Heerden

8 August 2015	Eastern Province Kings	14–51	Golden Lions	Nelson Mandela Bay Stadium, Port Elizabeth
14:15	Try: Sylvian Mahuza 19'; Simon Kerrod 53'; Con: Scott van Breda 20', 54' (2/2); Cards: Schalk Ferreira (yellow card) 66' to 76'	Report; Scoreboard	Try: Kwagga Smith 1', 16', 68'; Courtnall Skosan 6'; Howard Mnisi 13'; Anthony Volmink 77'; Con: Marnitz Boshoff 69', 78', 2', 7', 14', 17' (6/6); Pen: Marnitz Boshoff 34', 50', 58' (3/3); Drop: Marnitz Boshoff (0/1)	Attendance: 3,068; Referee: Quinton Immelman

8 August 2015	Free State Cheetahs	19–57	Blue Bulls	Free State Stadium, Bloemfontein
14:15	Try: Boom Prinsloo 4'; Shaun Venter 60'; Clayton Blommetjies 76'; Con: Niel Marais 5' (1/1); Fred Zeilinga 61' (1/2); Pen: Niel Marais (0/1)	Report; Scoreboard	Try: Jamba Ulengo 12'; Deon Stegmann 16'; Francois Hougaard 40', 63'; Warrick Gelant 46'; Travis Ismaiel 72'; Con: Tian Schoeman 13', 17', 40', 47', 64' (5/5); Louis Fouché 73' (1/1); Pen: Tian Schoeman 30', 38', 55', 69' (4/4); Louis Fouché 80' (1/1)	Attendance: 32,849; Referee: Marius van der Westhuizen

=== Round two ===
The Friday night action saw both the Blue Bulls and the Golden Lions extend their unbeaten runs in the competition by notching their second wins in a row. The Blue Bulls overturned a 6–12 deficit to score four second-half tries in a 36–12 victory over Griquas, who lost for the second consecutive match. Fly-half Tian Schoeman kicked 16 points for the Blue Bulls and also scored one of the Blue Bulls' tries. The Golden Lions scored five tries – two of those penalty tries – to the Pumas' three to prevail 44–27 in Johannesburg in a clash between two previously unbeaten sides that saw three players sent to the sin-bin. All eight tries in the match were successfully converted by the Golden Lions' Marnitz Boshoff (who also scored two penalties and a drop goal for a personal tally of 19 points) and the Pumas' JC Roos. There were no tries in the match in Cape Town as Western Province won their second match in succession by edging the clash 9–3 against a Free State Cheetahs side who had three players sin-binned, a result that saw the latter lose their second consecutive match, but gain a losing bonus point. The Sharks and the Eastern Province Kings each scored four tries in their clash in Durban, which saw the hosts get their first win of the season to move into fourth position on the log while the EP Kings' bonus points kept them in seventh, one point clear of Griquas.

14 August 2015	Blue Bulls	36–12	Griquas	Loftus Versfeld, Pretoria
19:10	Try: Dayan van der Westhuizen 59'; Tian Schoeman 64'; Francois Hougaard 67'; Jamba Ulengo 78'; Con: Tian Schoeman 66', 68' (2/3); Louis Fouché (0/1); Pen: Tian Schoeman 6', 39', 48', 58' (4/5)	Report; Scoreboard	Try: Ruhan Nel 10'; Ntabeni Dukisa 35'; Con: Gouws Prinsloo 36' (1/2); Pen: Gouws Prinsloo (0/2); Drop: Ruhan Nel (0/1)	Referee: Quinton Immelman

14 August 2015	Golden Lions	44–27	Pumas	Ellis Park Stadium, Johannesburg
19:10	Try: Harold Vorster 26' penalty try 33', 57'; Courtnall Skosan 44'; Stokkies Hanekom 71'; Con: Marnitz Boshoff 27', 34', 45', 58', 72' (5/5); Pen: Marnitz Boshoff 23', 56' (2/2); Drop: Marnitz Boshoff 8' (1/1); Cards: Ruan Combrinck (yellow card) 74'; Kwagga Smith (yellow card) 75'	Report; Scoreboard	Try: Marnus Schoeman 20'; Bernado Botha 42'; Stefan Watermeyer 54'; Con: JC Roos 21', 43', 55' (3/3); Pen: JC Roos 28', 49' (2/5); Cards: JC Roos (yellow card) 57' to 67'	Attendance: 7,629; Referee: Stuart Berry

15 August 2015	Western Province	9–3	Free State Cheetahs	Newlands Stadium, Cape Town
15:00	Pen: Demetri Catrakilis 54', 57', 60' (3/4)	Report; Scoreboard	Pen: Fred Zeilinga 18' (1/1); Cards: Rayno Benjamin (yellow card) 34' to 45'; Gerhard Olivier (yellow card) 59' to 69'; Henco Venter (yellow card) 64'	Attendance: 10,871; Referee: Jaco van Heerden

15 August 2015	Sharks	33–25	Eastern Province Kings	Kings Park Stadium, Durban
17:05	Try: André Esterhuizen 15'; Lionel Cronjé 17'; Dan du Preez 55'; Paul Jordaan 66'; Con: Joe Pietersen 18', 67' (2/4); Pen: Joe Pietersen 7', 25', 62' (3/3); Cards: Philip van der Walt (yellow card) 40' to 50'; Odwa Ndungane (yellow card) 73'	Report; Scoreboard	Try: George Whitehead 12'; Tim Agaba 40'; Steven Sykes 44'; Enrico Acker 47'; Con: Scott van Breda (0/2); George Whitehead 44' (1/2); Pen: Scott van Breda (0/1); George Whitehead 58' (1/1)	Attendance: 7,699; Referee: Marius van der Westhuizen

=== Round three ===
Despite scoring the only try of the match, the Eastern Province Kings lost the first match of the weekend 13–15 to a Pumas side for whom fly-half JC Roos slotted five penalties in five attempts. In a battle between two teams without any victories in the competition this far, the Free State Cheetahs ran out winners by beating Griquas 31–9 in Kimberley. The Cheetahs secured a bonus point by scoring four tries, with Fred Zeilinga scoring one of those in a personal contribution of 16 points, while Griquas remain bottom of the log with no log points to their name. The two teams from Gauteng remained the only unbeaten teams after victories in their matches – the Golden Lions scored four tries to beat the Sharks 31–16 in Durban, while the Blue Bulls beat defending champions Western Province 47–29 in the highest-scoring match of the weekend, with Jamba Ulengo scoring two tries and fly-half Tian Schoeman contributing 19 points with the boot, the same points haul as Western Province's Demetri Catrakilis.

21 August 2015	Eastern Province Kings	13–15	Pumas	Nelson Mandela Bay Stadium, Port Elizabeth
19:00	Try: Lizo Gqoboka 61'; Con: Scott van Breda 62' (1/1); Pen: Scott van Breda 10', 48' (2/3); Cards: Steven Sykes (yellow card) 35' to 45'	Report; Scoreboard	Pen: JC Roos 3', 12', 56', 65', 76' (5/5)	Attendance: 2,857; Referee: Rasta Rasivhenge

21 August 2015	Griquas	9–31	Free State Cheetahs	Griqua Park, Kimberley
19:10	Pen: Ntabeni Dukisa 8', 32', 40' (3/3); Cards: Ewald van der Westhuizen (yellow card) 52' to 63'	Report; Scoreboard	Try: Rayno Benjamin 16'; Fred Zeilinga 47'; Sergeal Petersen 50'; Gerhard Olivier 53'; Con: Fred Zeilinga 17', 48', 51', 54' (4/4); Pen: Fred Zeilinga 28' (1/2); Cards: Maks van Dyk (yellow card) 57' to 68'	Attendance: 3,000; Referee: Pro Legoete

22 August 2015	Sharks	16–31	Golden Lions	Kings Park Stadium, Durban
17:05	Try: Odwa Ndungane 60'; Con: Joe Pietersen 61' (1/1); Pen: Joe Pietersen 29', 35', 57' (3/3)	Report; Scoreboard	Try: Howard Mnisi 11'; Stokkies Hanekom 66'; Courtnall Skosan 73'; Anthony Volmink 79'; Con: Marnitz Boshoff 12', 67', 74', 80' (4/4); Pen: Ruan Combrinck 49' (1/1)	Attendance: 12,331; Referee: Quinton Immelman

22 August 2015	Blue Bulls	47–29	Western Province	Loftus Versfeld, Pretoria
19:10	Try: Burger Odendaal 50'; Jamba Ulengo 55', 61'; Travis Ismaiel 58'; Warrick Gelant 65'; Con: Tian Schoeman 51', 62' (2/5); Pen: Tian Schoeman 9', 12', 19', 25', 39' (5/7); Louis Fouché 77' (1/1)	Report; Scoreboard	Try: Seabelo Senatla 28'; Dillyn Leyds 45'; Con: Demetri Catrakilis 29', 46' (2/2); Pen: Demetri Catrakilis 3', 16', 32', 50', 55' (5/6); Cards: Dillyn Leyds (yellow card) 60' to 70'	Attendance: 27,546; Referee: Craig Joubert

=== Round four ===
The Golden Lions overtook the Blue Bulls at the top of the log on points difference after both teams extended their winning streaks to four matches. Kwagga Smith scored two tries and Marnitz Boshoff contributed 21 points with the boot as the Golden Lions scored a convincing 41–11 victory over a Pumas side that saw four of their players sin-binned during the course of the match. The Blue Bulls fought back from a 0–11 deficit after twenty minutes to secure a 46–32 victory over Griquas in Kimberley. Fly-half Tian Schoeman kicked 16 points to maintain his spot at the top of the points scoring charts, while winger Jamba Ulengo scored two tries in the match to top the try scoring charts. Dries Swanepoel also scored two tries as the visitors outscored Griquas by six tries to four. The Free State Cheetahs secured their second consecutive win by beating Western Province 28–21 in a match in Bloemfontein to move into the semifinal spots for the first time this season. Western Province remain in third despite suffering their second consecutive defeat. The Sharks kept in touch with the play-off places by securing a narrow 24–20 victory over the Eastern Province Kings in Port Elizabeth, fighting back from losing 0–13 shortly before half-time.

28 August 2015	Pumas	11–41	Golden Lions	Mbombela Stadium, Mbombela
19:00	Try: Faf de Klerk 52'; Con: JC Roos (0/1); Pen: JC Roos 39', 46' (2/4); Cards: Stefan Watermeyer (yellow card) 6' to 16'; Marnus Schoeman (yellow card) 62' to 72'; Uzair Cassiem (yellow card) 67' to 77'; Khwezi Mona (yellow card) 75'	Report; Scoreboard	Try: penalty try 6'; Kwagga Smith 57', 77'; Jacques van Rooyen 63'; Con: Marnitz Boshoff 7', 64', 78' (3/4); Pen: Marnitz Boshoff 21', 31', 42', 51' (4/4); Drop: Marnitz Boshoff 40' (1/1)	Attendance: 4,800; Referee: Pro Legoete

28 August 2015	Free State Cheetahs	28–21	Western Province	Free State Stadium, Bloemfontein
19:10	Try: Niell Jordaan 2'; Shaun Venter 15'; Rayno Benjamin 25'; Con: Fred Zeilinga 16', 26' (2/3); Pen: Fred Zeilinga 5', 20' (2/3); Sias Ebersohn 73' (1/1)	Report; Scoreboard	Try: Seabelo Senatla 32'; Rynhardt Elstadt 37'; Con: Demetri Catrakilis 38' (1/2); Pen: Demetri Catrakilis 13' (1/1); Kurt Coleman 56', 59' (2/2); Drop: Kurt Coleman (0/1)	Attendance: 9,425; Referee: Stuart Berry

29 August 2015	Griquas	32–46	Blue Bulls	Griqua Park, Kimberley
15:00	Try: Ntabeni Dukisa 7'; Carel Greeff 44'; AJ le Roux 56'; Riaan Viljoen 72'; Con: Ntabeni Dukisa 45' (1/2); Clinton Swart 57', 73' (2/2); Pen: Ntabeni Dukisa 3', 17' (2/3); Cards: Hilton Lobberts (yellow card) 77'	Report; Scoreboard	Try: Travis Ismaiel 28'; Jamba Ulengo 32', 61'; Dries Swanepoel 37', 40'; Louis Fouché 79'; Con: Tian Schoeman 29', 33', 38', 40', 62' (5/5); Louis Fouché (0/1); Pen: Tian Schoeman 22', 53' (2/3); Cards: Lappies Labuschagné (yellow card) 5' to 15'	Attendance: 2,500; Referee: Marius van der Westhuizen

29 August 2015	Eastern Province Kings	20–24	Sharks	Nelson Mandela Bay Stadium, Port Elizabeth
17:05	Try: Thembelani Bholi 3' penalty try 75'; Con: Scott van Breda 4', 75' (2/2); Pen: Scott van Breda 9', 32' (2/3); Cards: Siyanda Grey (yellow card) 25' to 35'	Report; Scoreboard	Try: Joe Pietersen 39'; Francois Kleinhans 48'; Dan du Preez 56'; Con: Joe Pietersen 40', 49', 57' (3/3); Pen: Joe Pietersen 61' (1/2); Cards: S'bura Sithole (yellow card) 75'	Attendance: 5,152; Referee: Jaco van Heerden

=== Round Five ===
The Golden Lions preserved their unbeaten status, winning their fifth consecutive match of the competition by beating the Eastern Province Kings 37–21 in Johannesburg. They scored five tries – which included their fourth penalty try of the season – against the visitors' three, which included a brace from loose-forward Paul Schoeman. The Golden Lions moved one point ahead of the Blue Bulls on the log after the latter failed to get a bonus point in their 24–17 victory over the Free State Cheetahs. Both teams scored two tries, with the kicking by competition top-scorer Tian Schoeman and replacement Louis Fouché proving decisive for the Blue Bulls. The Free State Cheetahs also slipped out of the semifinal positions, with a 27–26 victory for the Sharks over the Pumas ensuring the team from Durban move up to fourth. Winger Wandile Mjekevu contributed two tries for the Sharks and full-back Joe Pietersen contributed 12 points with the boot against a Pumas side that remained in sixth position. In Cape Town, Western Province returned to winning ways after two consecutive defeats by beating Griquas 33–15. They also got a bonus point for scoring four tries in the match through four different try scorers, while the highest points contribution of the round came from Clinton Swart, who kicked five penalties for a Griquas team who remain bottom of the log with a single point to their name.

4 September 2015	Blue Bulls	24–17	Free State Cheetahs	Loftus Versfeld, Pretoria
19:10	Try: Burger Odendaal 20'; Dries Swanepoel 71'; Con: Tian Schoeman (0/1); Louis Fouché 72' (1/1); Pen: Tian Schoeman 27', 35' (2/3); Louis Fouché 67', 80' (2/3)	Report; Scoreboard	Try: Rayno Benjamin 37'; Sias Ebersohn 77'; Con: Fred Zeilinga 38' (1/1); Clayton Blommetjies 77' (1/1); Pen: Fred Zeilinga 44' (1/4); Cards: Luan de Bruin (yellow card) 34' to 44'	Referee: Rasta Rasivhenge

5 September 2015	Sharks	27–26	Pumas	Kings Park Stadium, Durban
15:00	Try: Wandile Mjekevu 15', 69'; Paul Jordaan 45'; Con: Joe Pietersen 16', 46', 70' (3/3); Pen: Joe Pietersen 30', 75' (2/3); Cards: Cobus Reinach (yellow card) 26' to 36'	Report; Scoreboard	Try: Marius Coetzer 23'; JW Bell 55'; Con: JC Roos 24' (1/1); Justin van Staden 56' (1/1); Pen: JC Roos 26', 40' (2/2); Justin van Staden 60', 66' (2/4); Cards: Jacques Momberg (yellow card) 43' to 57'	Referee: Marius van der Westhuizen

5 September 2015	Western Province	33–15	Griquas	Newlands Stadium, Cape Town
17:05	Try: Nic Groom 25'; Rynhardt Elstadt 59'; Jaco Taute 69'; Robert du Preez 74'; Con: Kurt Coleman 26', 60' (2/3); Robert du Preez (0/1); Pen: Kurt Coleman 22', 39', 67' (3/4)	Report; Scoreboard	Pen: Clinton Swart 13', 29', 34', 43', 57' (5/6); Cards: Carel Greeff (yellow card) 23' to 34'; Jaco Nepgen (yellow card) 63' to 73'	Referee: Jaco van Heerden

5 September 2015	Golden Lions	37–21	Eastern Province Kings	Ellis Park Stadium, Johannesburg
19:10	Try: penalty try 4'; Kwagga Smith 11'; Stokkies Hanekom 13'; Stephan de Wit 30'; Ruan Combrinck 83'; Con: Jaco van der Walt 5', 13' (2/4); Marnitz Boshoff 84' (1/1); Pen: Jaco van der Walt 40' (1/1); Marnitz Boshoff 70' (1/1); Drop: Marnitz Boshoff (0/1)	Report; Scoreboard	Try: Siyanda Grey 15'; Paul Schoeman 23', 55'; Con: Karlo Aspeling 16', 25', 56' (3/3); Cards: Eital Bredenkamp (yellow card) 76'; Hansie Graaff (red card) 83'	Referee: Stuart Berry

=== Round Six ===
The Golden Lions beat their trans-Jukskei rivals the Blue Bulls 36–28 in the top-of-the-table match between two previously unbeaten teams. The Blue Bulls outscored the Golden Lions by four tries to three (with Blue Bulls winger Jamba Ulengo getting two tries), but it was not enough as 21 points from the boot of Marnitz Boshoff decided the match in the favour of the team from Johannesburg. This allowed Western Province to close the gap to the Blue Bulls after they beat the Sharks 37–27 in Durban and securing a bonus point for their four tries. At the bottom of the log, both the Eastern Province Kings and Griquas picked up their first wins of the season. The Eastern Province Kings beat the Free State Cheetahs 32–24 in Port Elizabeth despite playing the majority of the second half with just fourteen players following JP du Plessis' sending off for a punch. The Free State Cheetahs scored four tries, but Scott van Breda kicked 22 points to secure the victory for the home side. In Kimberley, two tries from Carel Greeff helped Griquas to a 32–15 win over the Pumas. Despite scoring four tries in the match, the result left Griquas bottom of the log, one point behind the Eastern Province Kings.

11 September 2015	Eastern Province Kings	32–24	Free State Cheetahs	Nelson Mandela Bay Stadium, Port Elizabeth
19:10	Try: Luther Obi 30'; Siyanda Grey 55'; Con: Scott van Breda 31', 56' (2/2); Pen: Scott van Breda 8', 14', 40', 61', 64', 70' (6/6); Cards: JP du Plessis (red card) 46'	Report; Scoreboard	Try: Gerhard Olivier 17'; Shaun Venter 21'; Clayton Blommetjies 34'; Sergeal Petersen 78'; Con: Fred Zeilinga 18', 22' (2/4)	Referee: Quinton Immelman

12 September 2015	Griquas	32–15	Pumas	Griqua Park, Kimberley
15:00	Try: Carel Greeff 9', 21'; Jacquin Jansen 46'; Jono Janse van Rensburg 79'; Con: Clinton Swart 10', 47' (2/3); Gouws Prinsloo 80' (1/1); Pen: Clinton Swart 7', 42' (2/3)	Report; Scoreboard	Try: Marnus Schoeman 68'; Roscko Speckman 70'; Con: Justin van Staden 68' (1/2); Pen: Justin van Staden 4' (1/2); Cards: Faf de Klerk (yellow card) 30' to 40'	Referee: Jaco van Heerden

12 September 2015	Sharks	27–37	Western Province	Kings Park Stadium, Durban
17:05	Try: André Esterhuizen 35'; Odwa Ndungane 60'; Con: Joe Pietersen 61' (1/2); Pen: Joe Pietersen 4', 10', 27', 40', 52' (5/6)	Report; Scoreboard	Try: Seabelo Senatla 6'; Rynhardt Elstadt 42'; Dillyn Leyds 47'; Bongi Mbonambi 53'; Con: Robert du Preez 7', 43', 48', 54' (4/4); Pen: Robert du Preez 13', 58' (2/2); Demetri Catrakilis 79' (1/1)	Referee: Rasta Rasivhenge

12 September 2015	Blue Bulls	28–36	Golden Lions	Loftus Versfeld, Pretoria
19:10	Try: Jamba Ulengo 40', 69'; Arno Botha 55'; Deon Stegmann 60'; Con: Tian Schoeman 40', 56', 61', 70' (4/4)	Report; Scoreboard	Try: Courtnall Skosan 3'; Franco Mostert 23'; Ruan Combrinck 34'; Con: Marnitz Boshoff 4', 24', 35' (3/3); Pen: Marnitz Boshoff 14', 27', 52', 78' (4/4); Drop: Marnitz Boshoff 19' (1/1)	Referee: Marius van der Westhuizen

=== Round Seven ===
The Golden Lions beat the Sharks 26–18 in their clash in Johannesburg to extend their unbeaten run to seven matches and also ensuring a semi-final slot. Both sides scored two tries as 16 points from the boot of Marnitz Boshoff proved decisive for the home side. The Free State Cheetahs got the biggest win of the weekend, beating their Super Rugby franchise partners Griquas 44–24 in Bloemfontein. The Free State Cheetahs were the only side to secure a four-try bonus point during the round, with Sergeal Petersen scoring two of their five tries as they leap-frogged the Sharks into fourth spot on the log, while Ruhan Nel got a brace for the visitors. Western Province closed the gap to the Blue Bulls in second place, avenging their Round Three defeat in a 29–14 victory in Cape Town. The lowest-scoring match of the weekend saw the Pumas scoring two tries in a 20–9 victory over the Eastern Province Kings in Nelspruit.

18 September 2015	Pumas	20–9	Eastern Province Kings	Mbombela Stadium, Mbombela
17:00	Try: Jason Fraser 14'; Marnus Schoeman 27'; Con: Justin van Staden 15', 28' (2/2); Pen: Justin van Staden 19', 43' (2/3)	Report; Scoreboard	Pen: Scott van Breda 8', 12', 30' (3/4); Cards: Thembelani Bholi (yellow card) 19' to 30'	Referee: Cwengile Jadezweni

18 September 2015	Western Province	29–14	Blue Bulls	Newlands Stadium, Cape Town
19:00	Try: Dillyn Leyds 3'; Huw Jones 9'; Jano Vermaak 77'; Con: Robert du Preez 5' (1/3); Pen: Robert du Preez 32', 46', 59', 65' (4/5)	Report; Scoreboard	Try: Travis Ismaiel 72'; Con: Tian Schoeman (0/1); Pen: Louis Fouché 12', 30', 34' (3/4); Tian Schoeman (0/1)	Referee: Rasta Rasivhenge

19 September 2015	Golden Lions	26–18	Sharks	Ellis Park Stadium, Johannesburg
14:30	Try: Lourens Erasmus 60'; Courtnall Skosan 65'; Con: Marnitz Boshoff 61', 65' (2/2); Pen: Marnitz Boshoff 28', 38', 43', 52' (4/5); Drop: Marnitz Boshoff (0/2)	Report; Scoreboard	Try: Joe Pietersen 76'; Francois Kleinhans 78'; Con: Joe Pietersen 79' (1/2); Pen: Joe Pietersen 33', 55' (2/3)	Referee: Jaco van Heerden

19 September 2015	Free State Cheetahs	44–24	Griquas	Free State Stadium, Bloemfontein
15:00	Try: Raymond Rhule 4'; Sergeal Petersen 15', 24'; Shaun Venter 51'; Zee Mkhabela 76'; Con: Fred Zeilinga 5', 16', 25', 52', 77' (5/5); Pen: Fred Zeilinga 40', 48', 69' (3/3)	Report; Scoreboard	Try: Ruhan Nel 8', 57'; Tian Meyer 65'; Con: Clinton Swart 9', 58', 66' (3/3); Pen: Clinton Swart 36' (1/1)	Attendance: 3,580; Referee: AJ Jacobs

=== Round Eight ===
The Golden Lions won their eighth consecutive match in the competition, scoring ten tries as they beat the Free State Cheetahs 73–31 in Bloemfontein. Courtnall Skosan and Jaco Kriel scored two tries each and fly-half Marnitz Boshoff had a faultless kicking performance, converting all ten tries after opening the scoring with his only penalty attempt of the match. A hat-trick by Cheetahs flanker Vince Jobo helped his side get a four-try bonus point to remain in fourth spot on the log, in the final semi-final position. The Blue Bulls remained in second spot on the log as they beat the Sharks 17–13 in Durban, but Western Province drew level on points with the Blue Bulls as both sides secured a semi-final berth. Western Province beat the Pumas 50–19 in Cape Town, with fly-half Robert du Preez scoring two tries and contributing a further 11 points with the boot for Western Province, while the Pumas' Roscko Speckman also scored a brace for his side. In the bottom-of-the-log clash, Eastern Province Kings captain Tim Whitehead scored a try after the hooter – his second of the match – to help his side to a 40–37 victory over Griquas. EP Kings flanker Paul Schoeman also got two tries in the match, as did Griquas winger Danie Dames.

25 September 2015	Sharks	13–17	Blue Bulls	Kings Park Stadium, Durban
20:00	Try: Garth April 58'; Con: Joe Pietersen 59' (1/1); Pen: Joe Pietersen 18', 23' (2/3); Cards: Mzamo Majola (yellow card) 82'	Report; Scoreboard	Try: Jamba Ulengo 39'; Deon Stegmann 56'; Con: Tian Schoeman 40', 56' (2/2); Pen: Tian Schoeman 31' (1/2)	Referee: Marius van der Westhuizen

26 September 2015	Free State Cheetahs	31–73	Golden Lions	Free State Stadium, Bloemfontein
13:15	Try: Sergeal Petersen 12'; Vince Jobo 32', 44', 50'; Francois Venter 74'; Con: Sias Ebersohn 45', 51' (2/4); Fred Zeilinga 75' (1/1)	Report; Scoreboard	Try: Courtnall Skosan 8', 15'; Stephan de Wit 19'; Jaco Kriel 28', 64'; Howard Mnisi 41'; Warren Whiteley 57'; Jaco van der Walt 71'; Kwagga Smith 79'; Anthony Volmink 81'; Con: Marnitz Boshoff 9', 16', 20', 29', 42', 58', 65', 72', 79', 82' (10/10); Pen: Marnitz Boshoff 5' (1/1); Cards: Warren Whiteley (yellow card) 40' to 51'	Referee: Rasta Rasivhenge

26 September 2015	Western Province	50–19	Pumas	Newlands Stadium, Cape Town
15:00	Try: Nizaam Carr 9'; Jano Vermaak 33'; Kobus van Wyk 42'; Robert du Preez 50', 60'; Jurie van Vuuren 66'; Alistair Vermaak 79'; Con: Robert du Preez 34', 43', 51', 61' (4/5); Demetri Catrakilis 67', 80' (2/2); Pen: Robert du Preez 39' (1/1); Cards: Johnny Kôtze (yellow card) 23' to 34'	Report; Scoreboard	Try: Roscko Speckman 12', 35'; Vincent Koch 24'; Con: Justin van Staden 25', 36' (2/3); Pen: Justin van Staden (0/1)	Referee: Rodney Boneparte

26 September 2015	Eastern Province Kings	40–37	Griquas	Nelson Mandela Bay Stadium, Port Elizabeth
15:30	Try: Luther Obi 34'; Paul Schoeman 39', 50'; Tim Whitehead 57', 80'; Con: Scott van Breda 40', 58', 81' (3/5); Pen: Scott van Breda 2', 22', 27' (3/3)	Report; Scoreboard	Try: Danie Dames 4', 37'; Clinton Swart 24'; Carel Greeff 46'; AJ le Roux 68'; Con: Clinton Swart 25', 38', 47' (3/5); Pen: Clinton Swart 7', 32' (2/3)	Referee: Quinton Immelman

=== Round Nine ===
The Golden Lions secured top spot on the log (and home advantage in their semi-final match) after a 62–32 victory over third-placed Western Province. The Golden Lions scored nine tries from nine different try scorers in their victory, while Western Province secured a bonus point for scoring four tries, with Sikhumbuzo Notshe scoring two of those. The Blue Bulls overturned a 17–20 half time deficit to win their match against the Eastern Province Kings 48–27. Francois Hougaard and Lappies Labuschagné each scored two of the Blue Bulls' seven tries as they consolidated second spot on the log. The results in the other two matches ensured that the Round Ten match between the Free State Cheetahs and Sharks would determine the final semi-finalist; the Free State Cheetahs drew 37-all with the Pumas in Nelspruit, outscoring the hosts five tries to four, while the Sharks scored six tries in Kimberley in their 45–20 rout of Griquas, for whom Ruhan Nel scored two tries.

2 October 2015	Golden Lions	62–32	Western Province	Ellis Park Stadium, Johannesburg
18:00	Try: Lourens Erasmus 12'; Malcolm Marx 14'; Marnitz Boshoff 22'; Franco Mostert 30'; Howard Mnisi 37'; Andries Coetzee 44'; Anthony Volmink 51'; Kwagga Smith 67'; Stokkies Hanekom 77'; Con: Marnitz Boshoff 12', 15', 23', 38', 52' (5/7); Jaco van der Walt 68', 78' (2/2); Pen: Marnitz Boshoff 4' (1/1)	Report; Scoreboard	Try: Sikhumbuzo Notshe 34', 74'; Johnny Kôtze 39'; Nic Groom 80'; Con: Robert du Preez 35', 40', 81' (3/4); Pen: Robert du Preez 6', 11' (2/2)	Referee: Marius van der Westhuizen

2 October 2015	Blue Bulls	48–27	Eastern Province Kings	Loftus Versfeld, Pretoria
19:10	Try: Lappies Labuschagné 26', 31'; Dries Swanepoel 49'; Francois Hougaard 55', 65'; Ruan Steenkamp 70'; Jacques du Plessis 78'; Con: Tian Schoeman 27', 32', 50', 56' (4/5); Louis Fouché 79' (1/2); Pen: Tian Schoeman 11' (1/1); Cards: Ruan Steenkamp (yellow card) 73'	Report; Scoreboard	Try: Tim Whitehead 20'; Elgar Watts 38'; JP du Plessis 74'; Con: Scott van Breda 21', 39', 75' (3/3); Pen: Scott van Breda 7', 35' (2/2); Cards: Edgar Marutlulle (yellow card) 48' to 58'; Schalk Ferreira (yellow card) 69'	Referee: Pro Legoete

3 October 2015	Pumas	37–37	Free State Cheetahs	Mbombela Stadium, Mbombela
13:15	Try: Jaco Bouwer 21'; De-Jay Terblanche 57'; Marnus Schoeman 68'; Rudi Mathee 79'; Con: Justin van Staden 22', 58', 70', 80' (4/4); Pen: Justin van Staden 7', 18', 38' (3/3)	Report; Scoreboard	Try: Sergeal Petersen 31'; Oupa Mohojé 33'; Francois Venter 40'; De Wet Kruger 51'; Freddy Ngoza 72'; Con: Sias Ebersohn 32', 34', 40' (3/4); Niel Marais (0/1); Pen: Sias Ebersohn 15' (1/1); Niel Marais 75' (1/1); Cards: Rayno Benjamin (yellow card) 21' to 31' (red card) 79'	Referee: Jaco van Heerden

3 October 2015	Griquas	20–45	Sharks	Griqua Park, Kimberley
15:00	Try: Ruhan Nel 5', 80'; Sandile Ngcobo 70'; Con: Clinton Swart 6' (1/3); Pen: Clinton Swart 26' (1/1)	Report; Scoreboard	Try: Cobus Reinach 19'; Paul Jordaan 23'; Francois Kleinhans 33'; André Esterhuizen 36'; Michael Claassens 55'; S'bura Sithole 66'; Con: Joe Pietersen 20', 24', 34', 37', 56', 67' (6/6); Pen: Joe Pietersen 18' (1/2); Cards: Paul Jordaan (yellow card) 63' to 72'	Referee: Rasta Rasivhenge

=== Round Ten ===
With three of the semifinalists already confirmed, the winner of the match between the Free State Cheetahs and the Sharks would clinch the final semi-final berth. The Free State Cheetahs led 17–13 at half-time, but the Sharks fought back and had a 34–20 lead by the 75th minute. However, the Free State Cheetahs responded with two late tries of their own, both of which were converted by Niel Marais – the second of those after the final hooter went – to earn themselves a 34-all draw, which was enough to see them remain in fourth spot on the log, with the Sharks remaining in fifth. The Golden Lions – already assured of top spot on the log – beat the bottom side Griquas 29–19 in Johannesburg to complete the regular season with 10 wins out of 10. Jacques Nel scored two tries for the home side as the result guaranteed Griquas would finish bottom. Home advantage in the other semi-final was still up for grabs and the Blue Bulls secured it, with two tries from both Deon Stegmann and Jamba Ulengo helping them to a closely fought 25–24 win over the Pumas in Nelspruit. The Blue Bulls' semi-final opponents, Western Province got a convincing 45–14 victory over the Eastern Province Kings in Cape Town with Dillyn Leyds scoring two of their six tries.

9 October 2015	Pumas	24–25	Blue Bulls	Mbombela Stadium, Mbombela
18:00	Try: Marnus Schoeman 4'; Roscko Speckman 62'; Rudi Mathee 81'; Con: Justin van Staden 4', 63' (2/2); Hennie Skorbinski 82' (1/1); Pen: Justin van Staden 47' (1/3)	Report; Scoreboard	Try: Deon Stegmann 13', 51'; Jamba Ulengo 15', 58'; Con: Tian Schoeman 60' (1/4); Pen: Tian Schoeman 40' (1/1); Cards: Deon Stegmann (yellow card) 33' to 43'	Referee: Rasta Rasivhenge

9 October 2015	Western Province	45–14	Eastern Province Kings	Newlands Stadium, Cape Town
18:00	Try: Nizaam Carr 2'; Juan de Jongh 30'; Godlen Masimla 34'; Dillyn Leyds 42', 80'; Justin Benn 57'; Con: Robert du Preez 3', 31', 35', 43' (4/4); Kurt Coleman 58', 81' (2/2); Pen: Robert du Preez 13' (1/1)	Report; Scoreboard	Try: Enrico Acker 36'; Con: Scott van Breda (0/1); Pen: Scott van Breda 8', 17', 28' (3/3)	Referee: Pro Legoete

10 October 2015	Free State Cheetahs	34–34	Sharks	Free State Stadium, Bloemfontein
14:00	Try: Rayno Benjamin 14', 76'; Boom Prinsloo 25'; Gerhard Olivier 79'; Con: Sias Ebersohn 14', 26' (2/2); Niel Marais 76', 80' (2/2); Pen: Sias Ebersohn 40', 52' (2/7); Cards: Luan de Bruin (yellow card) 61' to 73'	Report; Scoreboard	Try: Etienne Oosthuizen 18'; Cobus Reinach 36'; Paul Jordaan 43'; Garth April 64'; Con: Joe Pietersen 65' (1/3); Cobus Reinach (0/1); Pen: Joe Pietersen 2', 58', 62', 70' (4/5)	Referee: Marius van der Westhuizen

10 October 2015	Golden Lions	29–19	Griquas	Ellis Park Stadium, Johannesburg
16:05	Try: Sampie Mastriet 12'; Kwagga Smith 33'; Jacques Nel 64', 80'; Con: Jaco van der Walt 13', 34', 81' (3/4); Pen: Jaco van der Walt 62' (1/2)	Report; Scoreboard	Try: Carel Greeff 9'; Tian Meyer 40'; Dylon Frylinck 78'; Con: Gouws Prinsloo 10', 40' (2/3); Cards: RJ Liebenberg (yellow card) 53' to 63'	Referee: AJ Jacobs

=== Semi-finals ===
Defending champions Western Province ensured they would play in their fourth consecutive Currie Cup final by beating the Blue Bulls 23–18 in Pretoria. There were no tries scored in the first half, with the Blue Bulls' Tian Schoeman and Western Province's Robert du Preez each kicking three penalties as the teams went into the half-time break at 9-all. Schoeman scored a further three penalties in the second half, but tries from Cheslin Kolbe and Jano Vermaak for the visitors – both converted by Du Preez – secured a spot in the final for the team from Cape Town. The other semi-final was a high-scoring affair, with the Golden Lions beating the Free State Cheetahs 43–33 in Johannesburg. Golden Lions captain Jaco Kriel scored two tries, lock Lourens Erasmus scored one and a 65th minute penalty try completed the Golden Lions' try-scoring, while fly-half Marnitz Boshoff successfully converted the four tries and also kicked all five of his penalty attempts to finish the match with a personal points tally of 23 points. The Free State Cheetahs actually scored one try more than the Golden Lions with Francois Venter, Boom Prinsloo, Gerhard Olivier, Niel Marais and Sias Ebersohn each getting a try, but kicked just 11 points through Marais as the visitors fell just short. The result set up a repeat of the 2014 Currie Cup final between Western Province and Golden Lions, this time to be played at the latter's home ground in Johannesburg.

16 October 2015	Blue Bulls	18–23	Western Province	Loftus Versfeld, Pretoria
19:00	Pen: Tian Schoeman 2', 13', 26', 49', 57', 76' (6/8); Cards: Pierre Schoeman (yellow card) 23' to 35'	Report; Scoreboard	Try: Cheslin Kolbe 52'; Jano Vermaak 71'; Con: Robert du Preez 53' (1/1); Kurt Coleman 72' (1/1); Pen: Robert du Preez 15', 24', 30' (3/4); Drop: Cheslin Kolbe (0/1)	Attendance: 19,428; Referee: Pro Legoete

17 October 2015	Golden Lions	43–33	Free State Cheetahs	Ellis Park Stadium, Johannesburg
13:45	Try: Jaco Kriel 16', 69'; Lourens Erasmus 48' penalty try 65'; Con: Marnitz Boshoff 17', 49', 66', 71' (4/4); Pen: Marnitz Boshoff 26', 35', 59', 75', 79' (5/5)	Report; Scoreboard	Try: Francois Venter 4'; Boom Prinsloo 29'; Gerhard Olivier 51'; Niel Marais 56'; Sias Ebersohn 68'; Con: Niel Marais 57' (1/4); Sias Ebersohn (0/1); Pen: Niel Marais 20', 23' (2/2); Cards: Boom Prinsloo (yellow card) 65' to 75'; Maks van Dyk (yellow card) 72'	Referee: Jaco van Heerden

=== Final ===
The Golden Lions secured their eleventh Currie Cup title by beating Western Province 32–24 in Johannesburg. They scored two tries in the first quarter of the match through Warren Whiteley and Ross Cronjé – both converted by Marnitz Boshoff to lead 14–0. A Robert du Preez penalty put Western Province on the scoreboard in the 27th minute, but the Golden Lions responded minutes later when Ross Cronjé scored his second try of the match to lead 22–3. Western Province scored a try of their own at the end of the first half, with Robert du Preez scoring and converting the try for a half-time score of 22–10 to the hosts. Just two minutes after the restart, a further try Golden Lions centre Rohan Janse van Rensburg, again converted by Boshoff, stretched their lead to 29–10. Western Province reduced the deficit to eight points by the 63rd minute after scoring tries through Nizaam Carr and Sikhumbuzo Notshe – converted by Du Preez and Kurt Coleman respectively – on either side of a Boshoff penalty for the Golden Lions, but neither team could get on the scoreboard after that and the Golden Lions won the match 32–24 to go through the entire season unbeaten to win their first title since 2011.

24 October 2015	Golden Lions	32–24	Western Province	Ellis Park Stadium, Johannesburg
13:45	Try: Warren Whiteley 14'; Ross Cronjé 20', 34'; Rohan Janse van Rensburg 42'; Con: Marnitz Boshoff 15', 21', 43' (3/4); Pen: Marnitz Boshoff 38', 57' (2/4); Drop: Marnitz Boshoff (0/1)	Report; Scoreboard	Try: Robert du Preez 40'; Nizaam Carr 46'; Sikhumbuzo Notshe 62'; Con: Robert du Preez 40', 47' (2/2); Kurt Coleman 63' (1/1); Pen: Robert du Preez 27' (1/3); Cards: Chris van Zyl (yellow card) 79'	Attendance: 44,183; Referee: Rasta Rasivhenge

== Honours ==
The honour roll for the 2015 Currie Cup Premier Division was:

2015 Currie Cup Premier Division Honours
Champions:	Golden Lions (11th title)
Top Try Scorer:	Jamba Ulengo, Blue Bulls (11)
Top Points Scorer:	Marnitz Boshoff, Golden Lions (187)

== Players ==
=== Points scorers ===
The following table contain points which were scored in the 2015 Currie Cup Premier Division:

All point scorers
No	Player	Team	T	C	P	DG	Pts
1	Marnitz Boshoff	Golden Lions	1	46	27	3	187
2	Tian Schoeman	Blue Bulls	1	25	26	0	133
3	Joe Pietersen	Sharks	2	22	24	0	126
4	Robert du Preez	Western Province	4	19	14	0	100
5	Scott van Breda	Eastern Province Kings	0	13	21	0	89
6	Fred Zeilinga	Free State Cheetahs	1	16	8	0	61
7	Clinton Swart	Griquas	1	11	11	0	60
8	JC Roos	Pumas	0	7	15	0	59
9	Jamba Ulengo	Blue Bulls	11	0	0	0	55
10	Demetri Catrakilis	Western Province	0	10	11	0	53
11	Justin van Staden	Pumas	0	12	9	0	51
12	Kwagga Smith	Golden Lions	9	0	0	0	45
13	Sias Ebersohn	Free State Cheetahs	2	7	4	0	36
14	Marnus Schoeman	Pumas	7	0	0	0	35
14	Courtnall Skosan	Golden Lions	7	0	0	0	35
16	Louis Fouché	Blue Bulls	1	3	7	0	32
17	Dillyn Leyds	Western Province	6	0	0	0	30
17	Ruhan Nel	Griquas	6	0	0	0	30
17	Sergeal Petersen	Free State Cheetahs	6	0	0	0	30
20	Ntabeni Dukisa	Griquas	2	2	5	0	29
21	Kurt Coleman	Western Province	0	6	5	0	27
22	Rayno Benjamin	Free State Cheetahs	5	0	0	0	25
22	Carel Greeff	Griquas	5	0	0	0	25
22	Francois Hougaard	Blue Bulls	5	0	0	0	25
22	Seabelo Senatla	Western Province	5	0	0	0	25
22	Deon Stegmann	Blue Bulls	5	0	0	0	25
22	Jaco van der Walt	Golden Lions	1	7	2	0	25
28	Niel Marais	Free State Cheetahs	1	4	3	0	22
29	Nizaam Carr	Western Province	4	0	0	0	20
29	Stokkies Hanekom	Golden Lions	4	0	0	0	20
29	Travis Ismaiel	Blue Bulls	4	0	0	0	20
29	Paul Jordaan	Sharks	4	0	0	0	20
29	Jaco Kriel	Golden Lions	4	0	0	0	20
29	Howard Mnisi	Golden Lions	4	0	0	0	20
29	Sikhumbuzo Notshe	Western Province	4	0	0	0	20
29	Gerhard Olivier	Free State Cheetahs	4	0	0	0	20
29	Paul Schoeman	Eastern Province Kings	4	0	0	0	20
29	Roscko Speckman	Pumas	4	0	0	0	20
29	Dries Swanepoel	Blue Bulls	4	0	0	0	20
29	Shaun Venter	Free State Cheetahs	4	0	0	0	20
29	Anthony Volmink	Golden Lions	4	0	0	0	20
42	Dan du Preez	Sharks	3	0	0	0	15
42	Rynhardt Elstadt	Western Province	3	0	0	0	15
42	Lourens Erasmus	Golden Lions	3	0	0	0	15
42	André Esterhuizen	Sharks	3	0	0	0	15
42	Vince Jobo	Free State Cheetahs	3	0	0	0	15
42	Francois Kleinhans	Sharks	3	0	0	0	15
42	AJ le Roux	Griquas	3	0	0	0	15
42	Boom Prinsloo	Free State Cheetahs	3	0	0	0	15
42	Francois Venter	Free State Cheetahs	3	0	0	0	15
42	Jano Vermaak	Western Province	3	0	0	0	15
42	Tim Whitehead	Eastern Province Kings	3	0	0	0	15
53	Ruan Combrinck	Golden Lions	2	0	1	0	13
54	Clayton Blommetjies	Free State Cheetahs	2	1	0	0	12
55	Enrico Acker	Eastern Province Kings	2	0	0	0	10
55	Garth April	Sharks	2	0	0	0	10
55	Lionel Cronjé	Sharks	2	0	0	0	10
55	Ross Cronjé	Golden Lions	2	0	0	0	10
55	Danie Dames	Griquas	2	0	0	0	10
55	Juan de Jongh	Western Province	2	0	0	0	10
55	Stephan de Wit	Golden Lions	2	0	0	0	10
55	Warrick Gelant	Blue Bulls	2	0	0	0	10
55	Siyanda Grey	Eastern Province Kings	2	0	0	0	10
55	Nic Groom	Western Province	2	0	0	0	10
55	Lappies Labuschagné	Blue Bulls	2	0	0	0	10
55	Rudi Mathee	Pumas	2	0	0	0	10
55	Tian Meyer	Griquas	2	0	0	0	10
55	Wandile Mjekevu	Sharks	2	0	0	0	10
55	Franco Mostert	Golden Lions	2	0	0	0	10
55	Odwa Ndungane	Sharks	2	0	0	0	10
55	Jacques Nel	Golden Lions	2	0	0	0	10
55	Luther Obi	Eastern Province Kings	2	0	0	0	10
55	Burger Odendaal	Blue Bulls	2	0	0	0	10
55	Gouws Prinsloo	Griquas	0	5	0	0	10
55	Cobus Reinach	Sharks	2	0	0	0	10
55	Riaan Viljoen	Griquas	2	0	0	0	10
55	Stefan Watermeyer	Pumas	2	0	0	0	10
55	George Whitehead	Eastern Province Kings	1	1	1	0	10
55	Warren Whiteley	Golden Lions	2	0	0	0	10
80	Karlo Aspeling	Eastern Province Kings	0	3	0	0	6
81	Tim Agaba	Eastern Province Kings	1	0	0	0	5
81	JW Bell	Pumas	1	0	0	0	5
81	Justin Benn	Western Province	1	0	0	0	5
81	Thembelani Bholi	Eastern Province Kings	1	0	0	0	5
81	Arno Botha	Blue Bulls	1	0	0	0	5
81	Bernado Botha	Pumas	1	0	0	0	5
81	Jaco Bouwer	Pumas	1	0	0	0	5
81	Michael Claassens	Sharks	1	0	0	0	5
81	Andries Coetzee	Golden Lions	1	0	0	0	5
81	Marius Coetzer	Pumas	1	0	0	0	5
81	Faf de Klerk	Pumas	1	0	0	0	5
81	JP du Plessis	Eastern Province Kings	1	0	0	0	5
81	Jacques du Plessis	Blue Bulls	1	0	0	0	5
81	Jason Fraser	Pumas	1	0	0	0	5
81	Dylon Frylinck	Griquas	1	0	0	0	5
81	Lizo Gqoboka	Eastern Province Kings	1	0	0	0	5
81	Jono Janse van Rensburg	Griquas	1	0	0	0	5
81	Rohan Janse van Rensburg	Golden Lions	1	0	0	0	5
81	Jacquin Jansen	Griquas	1	0	0	0	5
81	Huw Jones	Western Province	1	0	0	0	5
81	Niell Jordaan	Free State Cheetahs	1	0	0	0	5
81	Simon Kerrod	Eastern Province Kings	1	0	0	0	5
81	Vincent Koch	Pumas	1	0	0	0	5
81	Cheslin Kolbe	Western Province	1	0	0	0	5
81	Johnny Kôtze	Western Province	1	0	0	0	5
81	De Wet Kruger	Free State Cheetahs	1	0	0	0	5
81	Sylvian Mahuza	Eastern Province Kings	1	0	0	0	5
81	Malcolm Marx	Golden Lions	1	0	0	0	5
81	Godlen Masimla	Western Province	1	0	0	0	5
81	Sampie Mastriet	Golden Lions	1	0	0	0	5
81	Bongi Mbonambi	Western Province	1	0	0	0	5
81	Zee Mkhabela	Free State Cheetahs	1	0	0	0	5
81	Oupa Mohojé	Free State Cheetahs	1	0	0	0	5
81	Sandile Ngcobo	Griquas	1	0	0	0	5
81	Freddy Ngoza	Free State Cheetahs	1	0	0	0	5
81	Etienne Oosthuizen	Sharks	1	0	0	0	5
81	Raymond Rhule	Free State Cheetahs	1	0	0	0	5
81	S'bura Sithole	Sharks	1	0	0	0	5
81	Ruan Steenkamp	Blue Bulls	1	0	0	0	5
81	Steven Sykes	Eastern Province Kings	1	0	0	0	5
81	Jaco Taute	Western Province	1	0	0	0	5
81	De-Jay Terblanche	Pumas	1	0	0	0	5
81	Dayan van der Westhuizen	Blue Bulls	1	0	0	0	5
81	Jacques van Rooyen	Golden Lions	1	0	0	0	5
81	Jurie van Vuuren	Western Province	1	0	0	0	5
81	Kobus van Wyk	Western Province	1	0	0	0	5
81	Alistair Vermaak	Western Province	1	0	0	0	5
81	Harold Vorster	Golden Lions	1	0	0	0	5
81	Elgar Watts	Eastern Province Kings	1	0	0	0	5
81	Heimar Williams	Sharks	1	0	0	0	5
131	Hennie Skorbinski	Pumas	0	1	0	0	2
—	penalty try	Golden Lions	5	0	0	0	25
—	penalty try	Eastern Province Kings	1	0	0	0	5
* Legend: T = Tries, C = Conversions, P = Penalties, DG = Drop Goals, Pts = Points.

=== Appearances ===
The player appearance record in the 2015 Currie Cup Premier Division is as follows:

Blue Bulls
Name	FSC	GRQ	WPr	GRQ	FSC	LIO	WPr	SHA	EPK	PMA	SF	F	App	Try	Kck	Pts
Dean Greyling	1	1	1	1		1						—N/a	5	0	0	0
Jaco Visagie	2	2	16 (substituted on)		16 (substituted on)	16 (substituted on)	16 (substituted on)	16 (substituted on)				—N/a	7	0	0	0
Werner Kruger	3	3	3	3		17 (substituted on)	17 (substituted on)	17 (substituted on)	17 (substituted on)	17 (substituted on)	17 (substituted on)	—N/a	10	0	0	0
Jacques du Plessis	4	4	4	4	4	4	4	4	7		4	—N/a	10	1	0	5
Marvin Orie	5	5	5	5	5	5	5	5	5	5	5	—N/a	11	0	0	0
Deon Stegmann	6	6				19 (substituted on)	6	6		6	6	—N/a	7	5	0	25
Lappies Labuschagné (c)	7	7	7	6	7	6	8	7	6	7	7	—N/a	11	2	0	10
Hanro Liebenberg	8	8	8									—N/a	3	0	0	0
Francois Hougaard	9	9	9		9	9	9	9	9	9	9	—N/a	10	5	0	25
Tian Schoeman	10	10	10	10	10	10	21 (substituted on)	10	10	10	10	—N/a	11	1	128	133
Jamba Ulengo	11	11	11	11	11	11	11	11	11	11	11	—N/a	11	11	0	55
Burger Odendaal	12	12	12	12	12	22 (substituted on)	12	12	12	12	12	—N/a	11	2	0	10
William Small-Smith	13	13							22 (substituted on)	22 (substituted on)	22 (substituted on)	—N/a	5	0	0	0
Travis Ismaiel	14	14	14	14	14	14	14	14	14	14	14	—N/a	11	4	0	20
Warrick Gelant	15	15	15	15	15	15	15	15	15	15	15	—N/a	11	2	0	10
Bandise Maku	16 (substituted on)	16 (substituted on)	2	2	2	2	2	2	2	2	2	—N/a	11	0	0	0
Nqoba Mxoli	17 (substituted on)											—N/a	1	0	0	0
RG Snyman	18 (substituted on)	18 (substituted on)	18 (substituted on)	18 (substituted on)	18 (substituted on)	18 (substituted on)	18 (substituted on)	18	4	4	18 (substituted on)	—N/a	10	0	0	0
Roelof Smit	19 (substituted on)	19 (substituted on)	6		6	7	7					—N/a	6	0	0	0
Ivan van Zyl	20 (substituted on)	20 (substituted on)	20 (substituted on)	9	20 (substituted on)	20	20 (substituted on)	20 (substituted on)	20 (substituted on)	20 (substituted on)	20 (substituted on)	—N/a	10	0	0	0
Louis Fouché	21 (substituted on)	21 (substituted on)	21 (substituted on)	21 (substituted on)	21 (substituted on)	21	10	21	21 (substituted on)	21 (substituted on)	21	—N/a	8	1	27	32
Dries Swanepoel	22 (substituted on)	22 (substituted on)	13	13	13	13	13	22	13	13	13	—N/a	11	4	0	20
Dayan van der Westhuizen		17 (substituted on)	17 (substituted on)	17 (substituted on)	17 (substituted on)							—N/a	4	1	0	5
Jannes Kirsten			19 (substituted on)	7	19 (substituted on)							—N/a	3	0	0	0
Dan Kriel			22 (substituted on)	22 (substituted on)								—N/a	2	0	0	0
Arno Botha				8	8	8	19 (substituted on)	8	8	8	8	—N/a	8	1	0	5
Corniel Els				16 (substituted on)					16 (substituted on)	16 (substituted on)	16 (substituted on)	—N/a	4	0	0	0
Nick de Jager				19 (substituted on)								—N/a	1	0	0	0
André Warner				20 (substituted on)								—N/a	1	0	0	0
Pierre Schoeman					1		1	1	1	1	1	—N/a	6	0	0	0
Marcel van der Merwe					3	3	3	3	3	3	3	—N/a	7	0	0	0
Jan Serfontein					22 (substituted on)	12	22 (substituted on)	13				—N/a	4	0	0	0
Ruan Steenkamp								19 (substituted on)	19 (substituted on)	19 (substituted on)		—N/a	3	1	0	5
Clyde Davids									18 (substituted on)			—N/a	1	0	0	0
Jason Jenkins										18 (substituted on)	19 (substituted on)	—N/a	2	0	0	0
Total													11	41	155	360
Andrew Beerwinkel, Riaan Britz, Tinus de Beer, Carlo Engelbrecht, Justin Forwood, Neethling Fouché, Nico Janse van Rensburg, Jesse Kriel, Kefentse Mahlo, Duncan Matthews, Morné Mellett, Ryan Nell, Trevor Nyakane, Marais Schmidt, Jade Stighling, Adriaan Strauss, Flip van der Merwe, Callie Visagie, Dennis Visser and Jurgen Visser were named in the Currie Cup Premier Division squad, but not included in a matchday squad.

Eastern Province Kings
Name	LIO	SHA	PMA	SHA	LIO	FSC	PMA	GRQ	BUL	WPr	SF	F	App	Try	Kck	Pts
Schalk Ferreira	1	1	1	17 (substituted on)		17 (substituted on)	1	1	17 (substituted on)	17 (substituted on)	—N/a	—N/a	9	0	0	0
Martin Ferreira	2	2	2	2		2	2	2	2	16 (substituted on)	—N/a	—N/a	9	0	0	0
Tom Botha	3	3	3	3		3	3	3	3		—N/a	—N/a	8	0	0	0
Steven Sykes	4	4	4	4		4	4	4	4		—N/a	—N/a	8	1	0	5
Cornell Hess	5	5	5	5	18 (substituted on)	19	19 (substituted on)	5	5	5	—N/a	—N/a	9	0	0	0
Luke Watson (c)	6	6		6							—N/a	—N/a	3	0	0	0
Stefan Willemse	7	7		19 (substituted on)	7	5	5	7	7	4	—N/a	—N/a	9	0	0	0
Tim Agaba	8	8	8	8		8	8	20	20 (substituted on)	8	—N/a	—N/a	8	1	0	5
Enrico Acker	9	9	9	9	20 (substituted on)	9	9	21 (substituted on)	9	9	—N/a	—N/a	10	2	0	10
George Whitehead	10	10									—N/a	—N/a	2	1	5	10
Luther Obi	11	11	11	11		11	11	11	11	11	—N/a	—N/a	9	2	0	10
Tim Whitehead	12	12			12	12	12	12	12		—N/a	—N/a	7	3	0	15
JP du Plessis	13	13	12	12	22 (substituted on)	13	13	13	13	12	—N/a	—N/a	10	1	0	5
Sylvian Mahuza	14				11			14	14	14	—N/a	—N/a	5	1	0	5
Scott van Breda	15	15	15	15		15	15	15	15	15	—N/a	—N/a	9	0	89	89
Michael van Vuuren	16 (substituted on)				16 (substituted on)						—N/a	—N/a	2	0	0	0
Simon Kerrod	17 (substituted on)	18 (substituted on)	18 (substituted on)	18 (substituted on)	3	18 (substituted on)	18 (substituted on)	18 (substituted on)	18 (substituted on)	3	—N/a	—N/a	10	1	0	5
Jacques Engelbrecht	18 (substituted on)	19 (substituted on)	7			20	20 (substituted on)	8	8	7	—N/a	—N/a	7	0	0	0
Paul Schoeman	19 (substituted on)		20 (substituted on)	20 (substituted on)	8	6	6	6	19 (substituted on)	20 (substituted on)	—N/a	—N/a	9	4	0	20
Kevin Luiters	20 (substituted on)	21 (substituted on)	21 (substituted on)								—N/a	—N/a	3	0	0	0
Karlo Aspeling	21 (substituted on)	22 (substituted on)	10	10	10	10	10	10	22 (substituted on)	22	—N/a	—N/a	9	0	6	6
Siyanda Grey	22 (substituted on)	14	14	14	14	14	14				—N/a	—N/a	7	2	0	10
Edgar Marutlulle		16 (substituted on)	16 (substituted on)	16 (substituted on)	2	16 (substituted on)	16 (substituted on)	16 (substituted on)	16 (substituted on)	2	—N/a	—N/a	9	0	0	0
Lizo Gqoboka		17 (substituted on)	17 (substituted on)	1	1	1	17 (substituted on)		1	1	—N/a	—N/a	8	1	0	5
Thembelani Bholi		20 (substituted on)	6	7	6	7	7	19 (substituted on)	6	6	—N/a	—N/a	9	1	0	5
Ronnie Cooke			13	13	13					13	—N/a	—N/a	4	0	0	0
Cameron Lindsay			19		5						—N/a	—N/a	1	0	0	0
Hansie Graaff			22	22	15						—N/a	—N/a	1	0	0	0
Dwayne Kelly				21 (substituted on)	9	21	21 (substituted on)	9	21 (substituted on)	21 (substituted on)	—N/a	—N/a	6	0	0	0
Tazz Fuzani					4						—N/a	—N/a	1	0	0	0
Basil Short					17 (substituted on)			17 (substituted on)		18 (substituted on)	—N/a	—N/a	3	0	0	0
Eital Bredenkamp					19 (substituted on)						—N/a	—N/a	1	0	0	0
Elgar Watts					21 (substituted on)	22 (substituted on)	22 (substituted on)	22 (substituted on)	10	10	—N/a	—N/a	6	1	0	5
David Bulbring										19 (substituted on)	—N/a	—N/a	1	0	0	0
penalty try													–	1	–	5
Total													10	23	100	215
Michael Bernardt, Albé de Swardt, Shane Gates, Siviwe Soyizwapi, Gary van Aswegen and Marlou van Niekerk were named in the Currie Cup Premier Division squad, but not included in a matchday squad.

Free State Cheetahs
Name	BUL	WPr	GRQ	WPr	BUL	EPK	GRQ	LIO	PMA	SHA	SF	F	App	Try	Kck	Pts
Caylib Oosthuizen	1	1	1	17 (substituted on)	17 (substituted on)							—N/a	5	0	0	0
Neil Rautenbach	2						16 (substituted on)	2	2	16		—N/a	4	0	0	0
Luan de Bruin	3	3	3	3	3	3	3	3	3	3	3	—N/a	11	0	0	0
Boela Serfontein	4							18 (substituted on)	18 (substituted on)			—N/a	3	0	0	0
Francois Uys (c)	5	5	5	5	5	18 (substituted on)			5	5	5	—N/a	9	0	0	0
Boom Prinsloo	6	6								6	6	—N/a	4	3	0	15
Henco Venter	7	7	7	7	7	19 (substituted on)	7					—N/a	7	0	0	0
Gerhard Olivier	8	19 (substituted on)	6	6	6	6	6	7	6	20 (substituted on)	20 (substituted on)	—N/a	11	4	0	20
Shaun Venter	9	9	9	9	9	9	9	21 (substituted on)	9	9	9	—N/a	11	4	0	20
Niel Marais	10								21 (substituted on)	22 (substituted on)	10	—N/a	4	1	17	22
Raymond Rhule	11	11	11	11	11		11		11	11	11	—N/a	9	1	0	5
Rayno Benjamin	12	12	12	12	12	12	12	20 (substituted on)	12	12	12	—N/a	11	5	0	25
Francois Venter	13	13	13	13	13	13	13	13	13	13	13	—N/a	11	3	0	15
Clayton Blommetjies	14	14	15	15	15	15	15	15	15	15	15	—N/a	11	2	2	12
Coenie van Wyk	15											—N/a	1	0	0	0
Jacques du Toit	16 (substituted on)	2	2	2	16 (substituted on)	2	2			2	2	—N/a	9	0	0	0
Maks van Dyk	17 (substituted on)	17 (substituted on)	17 (substituted on)								17 (substituted on)	—N/a	4	0	0	0
BG Uys	18 (substituted on)			1	1	1	17 (substituted on)	17 (substituted on)	17 (substituted on)	1	1	—N/a	9	0	0	0
Reniel Hugo	19 (substituted on)	18 (substituted on)	18 (substituted on)	18 (substituted on)	18 (substituted on)	5	5	5	4	18 (substituted on)	18 (substituted on)	—N/a	11	0	0	0
Tienie Burger	20 (substituted on)	20 (substituted on)	19 (substituted on)									—N/a	3	0	0	0
Zee Mkhabela	21 (substituted on)	21					20 (substituted on)	9				—N/a	3	1	0	5
Fred Zeilinga	22 (substituted on)	10	10	10	10	10	10	22 (substituted on)				—N/a	8	1	56	61
Armandt Koster		4	4	4	4	4	4			4	4	—N/a	8	0	0	0
Niell Jordaan		8	8	8	8	8	8	8		8	8	—N/a	9	1	0	5
AJ Coertzen		15							22			—N/a	1	0	0	0
Elandré Huggett		16	16 (substituted on)	16	2	16 (substituted on)						—N/a	3	0	0	0
Sias Ebersohn		22 (substituted on)	22 (substituted on)	22 (substituted on)	22 (substituted on)	22 (substituted on)	22 (substituted on)	10	10	10	22 (substituted on)	—N/a	10	2	26	36
Sergeal Petersen			14	14	14	11	14	14	14	14	14	—N/a	9	5	0	25
Freddy Ngoza			20 (substituted on)	19 (substituted on)	20 (substituted on)	20	19 (substituted on)	4	19 (substituted on)	19 (substituted on)	19 (substituted on)	—N/a	8	1	0	5
Ruan van Rensburg			21	20	21 (substituted on)	21			20	21 (substituted on)	21	—N/a	2	0	0	0
Tertius Kruger				21			21 (substituted on)	12				—N/a	2	0	0	0
Oupa Mohojé					19 (substituted on)	7	18 (substituted on)		7	7	7	—N/a	6	1	0	5
Cornal Hendricks						14						—N/a	1	1	0	5
Teunis Nieuwoudt						17	1	1	1	17 (substituted on)		—N/a	4	0	0	0
Vince Jobo								6				—N/a	1	3	0	15
Maphutha Dolo								11				—N/a	1	0	0	0
Chase Morison								16	16 (substituted on)			—N/a	1	0	0	0
De Wet Kruger								19 (substituted on)	8			—N/a	2	1	0	5
Torsten van Jaarsveld											16 (substituted on)	—N/a	1	0	0	0
Total													11	40	101	301
Dolph Botha, Renier Botha, Neil Claassen, Jean Cook, Pieter-Steyn de Wet, Willie du Plessis, Joubert Engelbrecht, Reinhardt Erwee, Nico Lee, George Marich, Marco Mason, Devin Oosthuizen, Hennie-Schalk Theron, Conraad van Vuuren, Carl Wegner and Arthur Williams were named in the Currie Cup Premier Division squad, but not yet included in a matchday squad.

Golden Lions
Name	EPK	PMA	SHA	PMA	EPK	BUL	SHA	FSC	WPr	GRQ	SF	F	App	Try	Kck	Pts
Jacques van Rooyen	1	1	17 (substituted on)	1	1	1	18 (substituted on)	1	17 (substituted on)	17 (substituted on)	1	1	12	1	0	5
Malcolm Marx	2	2	16 (substituted on)	16 (substituted on)	2	16 (substituted on)	2	2	2		2	16 (substituted on)	11	1	0	5
Julian Redelinghuys	3	3	3	17 (substituted on)	3	17 (substituted on)	3	17 (substituted on)	3		3	3	11	0	0	0
Franco Mostert	4	5	5	5		5	5	5	5		5	5	10	2	0	10
Martin Muller	5	4	18 (substituted on)	4	5	4							6	0	0	0
Jaco Kriel (c)	6	6	6			6	6	6	6		6	6	9	4	0	20
Kwagga Smith	7	20 (substituted on)	7	6	6	20 (substituted on)	7	19 (substituted on)	19 (substituted on)	6	19 (substituted on)	7	12	9	0	45
Ruaan Lerm	8	8	8							7			4	0	0	0
Ross Cronjé	9	9	9	9		9	9	9	9		9	9	10	2	0	10
Marnitz Boshoff	10	10	10	10	21 (substituted on)	10	10	10	10		10	10	11	1	182	187
Anthony Volmink	11		22 (substituted on)	22 (substituted on)	11			22 (substituted on)	11		11	11	8	4	0	20
Howard Mnisi	12	12	12	13	12	12	12	12	12		12	12	11	4	0	20
Harold Vorster	13	13											2	1	0	5
Courtnall Skosan	14	11	11	11		11	11	11	14		14	14	10	7	0	35
Ruan Combrinck	15	15	14	15	14	14	14	14					8	2	3	13
Robbie Coetzee	16 (substituted on)	16 (substituted on)	2	2	16 (substituted on)	2	16 (substituted on)			2	16 (substituted on)	2	10	0	0	0
Ruan Dreyer	17 (substituted on)	17 (substituted on)	1	3	17 (substituted on)	3	17 (substituted on)	3	16 (substituted on)		17 (substituted on)	17 (substituted on)	11	0	0	0
MB Lusaseni	18 (substituted on)	18 (substituted on)	4	18 (substituted on)	4	18 (substituted on)	19 (substituted on)			4			8	0	0	0
Stephan de Wit	19 (substituted on)	19 (substituted on)	19 (substituted on)	7	7	7	20 (substituted on)	7	7	19 (substituted on)	7	19 (substituted on)	12	2	0	10
Lohan Jacobs	20 (substituted on)				9					20 (substituted on)			3	0	0	0
Jaco van der Walt	21 (substituted on)	21 (substituted on)	15	20 (substituted on)	10	21	21 (substituted on)	20 (substituted on)	20 (substituted on)	10	20 (substituted on)	20 (substituted on)	11	1	20	25
Stokkies Hanekom	22 (substituted on)	22 (substituted on)	13	21 (substituted on)	13	13	13	13	21 (substituted on)		13	21 (substituted on)	11	4	0	20
Fabian Booysen		7		8	8	8	8	18 (substituted on)	18 (substituted on)	18 (substituted on)	18 (substituted on)	18 (substituted on)	10	0	0	0
Sampie Mastriet		14		14					22 (substituted on)	14	22 (substituted on)	22 (substituted on)	6	1	0	5
Ashlon Davids			20 (substituted on)										1	0	0	0
Alwyn Hollenbach			21 (substituted on)	12									2	0	0	0
Jano Venter				19 (substituted on)	19 (substituted on)	19 (substituted on)							3	0	0	0
Andries Coetzee					15	15	15	15	15		15	15	7	1	0	5
Lourens Erasmus					18 (substituted on)		4	4	4		4	4	6	3	0	15
Ricky Schroeder					20 (substituted on)					9			2	0	0	0
Jacques Nel					22 (substituted on)					13			2	2	0	10
Rohan Janse van Rensburg						22 (substituted on)	22 (substituted on)	21 (substituted on)	13	21 (substituted on)	21 (substituted on)	13	7	1	0	5
Dylan Smith							1		1	1			3	0	0	0
Warren Whiteley								8	8	8	8	8	5	2	0	10
Mark Pretorius								16 (substituted on)		16 (substituted on)			2	0	0	0
Pieter Scholtz										3			1	0	0	0
Bobby de Wee										5			1	0	0	0
Mark Richards										11			1	0	0	0
Gerdus van der Walt										12			1	0	0	0
Vainon Willis										15			1	0	0	0
Selom Gavor										22 (substituted on)			1	0	0	0
penalty try													–	5	–	25
Total													12	60	205	505
Justin Ackerman, Ruan Ackermann, Cyle Brink, JP du Preez, Marco Jansen van Vuren, Koch Marx, Derick Minnie and Ramone Samuels were named in the Currie Cup Premier Division squad, but not yet included in a matchday squad.

Griquas
Name	WPr	BUL	FSC	BUL	WPr	PMA	FSC	EPK	SHA	LIO	SF	F	App	Try	Kck	Pts
Danie Mienie	1	1	17 (substituted on)		17 (substituted on)	17 (substituted on)	17 (substituted on)		17 (substituted on)	1	—N/a	—N/a	8	0	0	0
AJ le Roux	2	2	2	2	16 (substituted on)	2	2	16 (substituted on)	16 (substituted on)	16 (substituted on)	—N/a	—N/a	10	3	0	15
Ewald van der Westhuizen	3	17 (substituted on)	18 (substituted on)	3	18 (substituted on)	18 (substituted on)		3			—N/a	—N/a	7	0	0	0
Stephan Greeff	4							18		18 (substituted on)	—N/a	—N/a	2	0	0	0
Hugo Kloppers	5	5	19 (substituted on)	5	5	5	5	5	5	5	—N/a	—N/a	10	0	0	0
RJ Liebenberg	6	6	20 (substituted on)	8	7		6	6	6	6	—N/a	—N/a	9	0	0	0
Nardus van der Walt	7										—N/a	—N/a	1	0	0	0
Carel Greeff	8	8	8	19 (substituted on)	8	8	8	8	8	8	—N/a	—N/a	10	5	0	25
Tian Meyer (c)	9	9	9	9	9	9	9	9	9	9	—N/a	—N/a	10	2	0	10
Riaan Viljoen	10	10	15	15	15	15	15			22 (substituted on)	—N/a	—N/a	8	2	0	10
Ntabeni Dukisa	11	11	11	11			22 (substituted on)	11	15	11	—N/a	—N/a	8	2	19	29
Michael van der Spuy	12	12	12	13				13			—N/a	—N/a	5	0	0	0
Ruhan Nel	13	14	13	22 (substituted on)	11	14	14		11	13	—N/a	—N/a	9	6	0	30
Ederies Arendse	14							22 (substituted on)			—N/a	—N/a	2	0	0	0
Gouws Prinsloo	15	15			21 (substituted on)	22 (substituted on)	21 (substituted on)	15	21 (substituted on)	15	—N/a	—N/a	8	0	10	10
Martin Bezuidenhout	16 (substituted on)	16 (substituted on)	16 (substituted on)	16 (substituted on)	2	16 (substituted on)	16 (substituted on)	2	2		—N/a	—N/a	9	0	0	0
Stephan Kotzé	17 (substituted on)	3	3		3	3	3	17 (substituted on)	3	3	—N/a	—N/a	9	0	0	0
Jaco Nepgen	18 (substituted on)	18 (substituted on)	5	4	4	4	4				—N/a	—N/a	7	0	0	0
Leon Karemaker	19 (substituted on)	19 (substituted on)			20 (substituted on)				18 (substituted on)		—N/a	—N/a	4	0	0	0
Rudi van Rooyen	20 (substituted on)	20 (substituted on)	21 (substituted on)	20 (substituted on)							—N/a	—N/a	4	0	0	0
Jacquin Jansen	21 (substituted on)	22 (substituted on)			22 (substituted on)	11	11				—N/a	—N/a	5	1	0	5
Sandile Ngcobo	22 (substituted on)		14	14	14				22 (substituted on)	14	—N/a	—N/a	6	1	0	5
Jonathan Adendorf		4	4	7	19 (substituted on)	7	7	4	4	4	—N/a	—N/a	9	0	0	0
Hilton Lobberts		7	6	18 (substituted on)	6						—N/a	—N/a	4	0	0	0
Johnathan Francke		13		21 (substituted on)	13	13	13	21 (substituted on)	13	21 (substituted on)	—N/a	—N/a	8	0	0	0
Clinton Swart		21 (substituted on)	22 (substituted on)	12	12	12	12	12	12	12	—N/a	—N/a	9	1	55	60
Steph Roberts			1	1	1	1	1	1	1	17 (substituted on)	—N/a	—N/a	8	0	0	0
Johan Wessels			7	6		6					—N/a	—N/a	3	0	0	0
Francois Brummer			10	10	10	10	10	10	10	10	—N/a	—N/a	8	0	0	0
Luxolo Koza				17 (substituted on)							—N/a	—N/a	1	0	0	0
Jono Janse van Rensburg						19 (substituted on)	18 (substituted on)	7	7	7	—N/a	—N/a	5	1	0	5
Wendal Wehr						20 (substituted on)	19 (substituted on)	19 (substituted on)	19 (substituted on)	19 (substituted on)	—N/a	—N/a	5	0	0	0
Dylon Frylinck						21	20 (substituted on)	20 (substituted on)	20 (substituted on)	20 (substituted on)	—N/a	—N/a	4	1	0	5
Danie Dames								14	14		—N/a	—N/a	2	2	0	10
Sidney Tobias										2	—N/a	—N/a	1	0	0	0
Total													10	27	84	219
Abrie Griesel, Rocco Jansen, Wiseman Kamanga, Sidney Tobias and PJ Vermeulen were named in the Currie Cup Premier Division squad, but not included in a matchday squad.

Sharks
Name	PMA	EPK	LIO	EPK	PMA	WPr	LIO	BUL	GRQ	FSC	SF	F	App	Try	Kck	Pts
Thomas du Toit	1	3	3	17 (substituted on)	17 (substituted on)	1	1	1	1	1	—N/a	—N/a	10	0	0	0
Monde Hadebe	2	2	2	2	2	2	16 (substituted on)			16 (substituted on)	—N/a	—N/a	8	0	0	0
Lourens Adriaanse	3										—N/a	—N/a	1	0	0	0
Etienne Oosthuizen	4	4	4	4	4	4	4	4	7	7	—N/a	—N/a	10	1	0	5
Marco Wentzel (c)	5	5	5	5	5	5	5	18 (substituted on)	5	5	—N/a	—N/a	10	0	0	0
Khaya Majola	6										—N/a	—N/a	1	0	0	0
Jean-Luc du Preez	7		19 (substituted on)	19 (substituted on)	19 (substituted on)	7	7				—N/a	—N/a	6	0	0	0
Philip van der Walt	8	8	8	8	8	8	8	8	8	8	—N/a	—N/a	10	0	0	0
Stefan Ungerer	9	9	20 (substituted on)	20 (substituted on)	20						—N/a	—N/a	4	0	0	0
Lionel Cronjé	10	10	10	10	10						—N/a	—N/a	5	2	0	10
S'bura Sithole	11		11	11	11	11	11	11	11	11	—N/a	—N/a	9	1	0	5
Heimar Williams	12	12			21	21 (substituted on)	21 (substituted on)	21	21 (substituted on)	21 (substituted on)	—N/a	—N/a	6	1	0	5
Wandile Mjekevu	13	13	21 (substituted on)	21 (substituted on)	14	14	14	14	14		—N/a	—N/a	9	2	0	10
André Esterhuizen	14	11	12	12	12	12	12	12	12	12	—N/a	—N/a	10	3	0	15
Joe Pietersen	15	15	15	15	15	10	10	10	10	10	—N/a	—N/a	10	2	116	126
Franco Marais	16 (substituted on)	16 (substituted on)	16 (substituted on)			16 (substituted on)	2	2	2	2	—N/a	—N/a	8	0	0	0
Juan Schoeman	17 (substituted on)	1									—N/a	—N/a	2	0	0	0
David McDuling	18 (substituted on)	18 (substituted on)	18 (substituted on)			18 (substituted on)	18 (substituted on)	5	4	4	—N/a	—N/a	8	0	0	0
Francois Kleinhans	19 (substituted on)	19 (substituted on)	6	6	6	6	6	6	6	6	—N/a	—N/a	10	3	0	15
Dan du Preez	20 (substituted on)	7	7	7	7		19				—N/a	—N/a	5	3	0	15
Michael Claassens	21 (substituted on)	20 (substituted on)	9	9		20 (substituted on)	20 (substituted on)	20 (substituted on)	20 (substituted on)	20 (substituted on)	—N/a	—N/a	9	1	0	5
SP Marais	22 (substituted on)	22 (substituted on)	22 (substituted on)								—N/a	—N/a	3	0	0	0
Jean Deysel		6						19 (substituted on)	19 (substituted on)	19 (substituted on)	—N/a	—N/a	4	0	0	0
Odwa Ndungane		14	14	14		15	15	15	15	14	—N/a	—N/a	8	2	0	10
Gerhard Engelbrecht		17 (substituted on)	17 (substituted on)	3	3	3	3	3	3	3	—N/a	—N/a	9	0	0	0
Paul Jordaan		21 (substituted on)	13	13	13	13	13	13	13	13	—N/a	—N/a	9	4	0	20
Dale Chadwick			1	1	1	17 (substituted on)	17 (substituted on)				—N/a	—N/a	5	0	0	0
Kyle Cooper				16 (substituted on)	16 (substituted on)			16 (substituted on)	16 (substituted on)		—N/a	—N/a	4	0	0	0
JC Astle				18 (substituted on)	18 (substituted on)						—N/a	—N/a	2	0	0	0
Garth April				22 (substituted on)	22 (substituted on)	22 (substituted on)	22 (substituted on)	22 (substituted on)	22 (substituted on)	15	—N/a	—N/a	7	2	0	10
Cobus Reinach					9	9	9	9	9	9	—N/a	—N/a	6	2	0	10
Christiaan de Bruin						19 (substituted on)		7	18 (substituted on)	18	—N/a	—N/a	3	0	0	0
Mzamo Majola								17 (substituted on)	17 (substituted on)	17 (substituted on)	—N/a	—N/a	3	0	0	0
Waylon Murray										22 (substituted on)	—N/a	—N/a	1	0	0	0
Total													10	29	116	261
Tonderai Chavhanga, Marcell Coetzee, Wiehan Hay, Conrad Hoffmann, Alcino Izaacs, Ryan Kankowski, Patrick Lambie, Stephan Lewies, Charlie Mayeza, Tendai Mtawarira, Tera Mtembu, Lwazi Mvovo, JP Pietersen, François Steyn, Jaco van Tonder and Hanco Venter were named in the Currie Cup Premier Division squad, but not included in a matchday squad.

Pumas
Name	SHA	LIO	EPK	LIO	SHA	GRQ	EPK	WPr	FSC	BUL	SF	F	App	Try	Kck	Pts
Khwezi Mona	1	1	3	3	18 (substituted on)	17 (substituted on)		17 (substituted on)			—N/a	—N/a	7	0	0	0
Frank Herne	2	2	2	16 (substituted on)		16 (substituted on)	2	2	2	16 (substituted on)	—N/a	—N/a	9	0	0	0
De-Jay Terblanche	3	3	17 (substituted on)	17 (substituted on)	17 (substituted on)	3			17 (substituted on)	17 (substituted on)	—N/a	—N/a	8	1	0	5
Giant Mtyanda	4	4	5	18 (substituted on)	19 (substituted on)	5	4	4	4	5	—N/a	—N/a	10	0	0	0
Marius Coetzer	5	5		5	5	18 (substituted on)	5	5	5	18 (substituted on)	—N/a	—N/a	9	1	0	5
Marnus Schoeman	6	6	6	6	20 (substituted on)	6	6	6	19 (substituted on)	6	—N/a	—N/a	10	7	0	35
Uzair Cassiem	7	7	7	7	7	7	19 (substituted on)	19 (substituted on)	7	7	—N/a	—N/a	10	0	0	0
Lambert Groenewald	8	8									—N/a	—N/a	2	0	0	0
Faf de Klerk	9	9	9	9	9	9	9	9	9	9	—N/a	—N/a	10	1	0	5
JC Roos	10	10	10	10	10						—N/a	—N/a	5	0	59	59
Roscko Speckman	11	11	11	11	11	11	11	11	11	11	—N/a	—N/a	10	4	0	20
Stefan Watermeyer (c)	12	12	12	12	12		12		12	12	—N/a	—N/a	8	2	0	10
Trompie Pretorius	13	13	13	13	22 (substituted on)	13	14	13	14	13	—N/a	—N/a	10	0	0	0
Bernado Botha	14	14	14	14	14	14		14	22 (substituted on)	14	—N/a	—N/a	9	1	0	5
JW Bell	15	15	15	15	15				15		—N/a	—N/a	6	1	0	5
François du Toit	16 (substituted on)	16	16 (substituted on)		16 (substituted on)	2			16 (substituted on)	2	—N/a	—N/a	6	0	0	0
Corné Fourie	17 (substituted on)	17 (substituted on)	1	1	1	1	1	1	1	1	—N/a	—N/a	10	0	0	0
Jason Fraser	18 (substituted on)	18 (substituted on)	8	8	8	8	8	8	8	8	—N/a	—N/a	10	1	0	5
Jaco Bouwer	19 (substituted on)	19 (substituted on)	19 (substituted on)	19 (substituted on)	6	19 (substituted on)	7	7	6		—N/a	—N/a	9	1	0	5
Reynier van Rooyen	20 (substituted on)	20	20	20 (substituted on)		20 (substituted on)	20 (substituted on)		20	20 (substituted on)	—N/a	—N/a	5	0	0	0
Justin van Staden	21	21 (substituted on)	21 (substituted on)	21 (substituted on)	21 (substituted on)	10	10	10	10	10	—N/a	—N/a	9	0	51	51
Hoffmann Maritz	22	22	22 (substituted on)	22 (substituted on)	13	15	15	15	13	15	—N/a	—N/a	8	0	0	0
Rudi Mathee			4	4	4	4			18 (substituted on)	4	—N/a	—N/a	6	2	0	10
Jannie Stander			18				18 (substituted on)	18 (substituted on)			—N/a	—N/a	2	0	0	0
Jacques Momberg				2	2						—N/a	—N/a	2	0	0	0
Vincent Koch					3		3	3	3	3	—N/a	—N/a	5	1	0	5
Deon Helberg						12		22 (substituted on)			—N/a	—N/a	2	0	0	0
Wilmaure Louw						21 (substituted on)	13	12		22 (substituted on)	—N/a	—N/a	4	0	0	0
Hennie Skorbinski						22 (substituted on)	21	21 (substituted on)	21 (substituted on)	21 (substituted on)	—N/a	—N/a	4	0	2	2
Simon Westraadt							16 (substituted on)	16 (substituted on)			—N/a	—N/a	2	0	0	0
Marné Coetzee							17 (substituted on)				—N/a	—N/a	1	0	0	0
Marcello Sampson							22				—N/a	—N/a	0	0	0	0
Johan Herbst								20 (substituted on)			—N/a	—N/a	1	0	0	0
Dylan Peterson										19 (substituted on)	—N/a	—N/a	1	0	0	0
Total													10	23	112	227
Renaldo Bothma, JJ Breet, Ruwellyn Isbell, Marco Kruger, Theo Kruger, Sabelo Nhlapo, Sino Nyoka, Dewald Pretorius, Brian Shabangu, Frikkie Spies, Heinrich Steyl, Drew van Coller and Eduan van der Walt were named in the Currie Cup Premier Division squad, but not included in a matchday squad.

Western Province
Name	GRQ	FSC	BUL	FSC	GRQ	SHA	BUL	PMA	LIO	EPK	SF	F	App	Try	Kck	Pts
Oli Kebble	1	1	1			17 (substituted on)	17 (substituted on)	1	17 (substituted on)	1	17 (substituted on)	17 (substituted on)	10	0	0	0
Bongi Mbonambi	2	2	2	2	16 (substituted on)	16 (substituted on)	2	2	2	16 (substituted on)	2	2	12	1	0	5
Wilco Louw	3	3	3	3	3	3	3	3	3	3	3	3	12	0	0	0
Jean Kleyn	4	4	4	4	4	4	4	18 (substituted on)	4	4	4	4	12	0	0	0
Ruan Botha	5	5	5	5	5	5	5	5	5		5	5	11	0	0	0
Rynhardt Elstadt	6	6	6	6	7	7					6	6	8	3	0	15
Sikhumbuzo Notshe	7	7	7	7		8	8	6	7	7	7	7	11	4	0	20
Nizaam Carr	8	8	8	8	8		19 (substituted on)	8	8	8	8	8	11	4	0	20
Nic Groom	9	9	9		9	9	9	20 (substituted on)	9	20 (substituted on)	9	9	11	2	0	10
Demetri Catrakilis	10	10	10	10		21 (substituted on)	21 (substituted on)	21 (substituted on)					7	0	53	53
Seabelo Senatla	11	11	11	11	11	11	11	11	11		11	11	11	5	0	25
Jaco Taute	12	12	12	12	12			22 (substituted on)		22 (substituted on)			7	1	0	5
Juan de Jongh (c)	13	13							12	12	12	12	6	2	0	10
Dillyn Leyds	14	14	14	22 (substituted on)	22 (substituted on)	14	14	15		15	14	14	11	6	0	30
Cheslin Kolbe	15	15	15	15	15	15	15		15		15	15	10	1	0	5
Marius Fourie	16 (substituted on)	16 (substituted on)											2	0	0	0
Alistair Vermaak	17 (substituted on)	17 (substituted on)	17 (substituted on)	1				17 (substituted on)					5	1	0	5
Chris van Zyl	18 (substituted on)		18 (substituted on)		18 (substituted on)	18 (substituted on)	18 (substituted on)		18 (substituted on)	5	18 (substituted on)	18 (substituted on)	9	0	0	0
Chris Cloete	19 (substituted on)	19 (substituted on)	19 (substituted on)	19 (substituted on)	6	6	6		6				8	0	0	0
Jano Vermaak	20 (substituted on)	20 (substituted on)	20 (substituted on)			20 (substituted on)	20 (substituted on)	9			20 (substituted on)	20 (substituted on)	8	3	0	15
Kurt Coleman	21 (substituted on)	21 (substituted on)	21 (substituted on)	21 (substituted on)	10				21 (substituted on)	21 (substituted on)	21 (substituted on)	21 (substituted on)	9	0	27	27
Johnny Kôtze	22 (substituted on)		13	13	13	13	13	13	13		13	13	10	1	0	5
Jan de Klerk		18 (substituted on)		18 (substituted on)				4		18 (substituted on)			4	0	0	0
Kobus van Wyk		22 (substituted on)		14	14	22 (substituted on)	22 (substituted on)	14	14	14			8	1	0	5
Scarra Ntubeni			16 (substituted on)	16 (substituted on)	2	2	16 (substituted on)						5	0	0	0
Huw Jones			22 (substituted on)			12	12	12	22 (substituted on)	13	22 (substituted on)	22 (substituted on)	8	1	0	5
Godlen Masimla				9	20 (substituted on)				20	9			3	1	0	5
JP Smith				17 (substituted on)	17 (substituted on)								2	0	0	0
Louis Schreuder				20 (substituted on)									1	0	0	0
Steven Kitshoff					1	1	1		1	17 (substituted on)	1	1	7	0	0	0
Jurie van Vuuren					19 (substituted on)	19 (substituted on)	7	7	19 (substituted on)	6	19 (substituted on)	19 (substituted on)	8	1	0	5
Robert du Preez					21 (substituted on)	10	10	10	10	10	10	10	8	4	80	100
Mike Willemse								16 (substituted on)	16 (substituted on)	2	16 (substituted on)	16 (substituted on)	5	0	0	0
Justin Benn								19 (substituted on)		19 (substituted on)			2	1	0	5
Leolin Zas										11			1	0	0	0
Total													12	43	160	375
Josh Katzen, Kyle Lombard, Sti Sithole, Rayn Smid, Chad Solomon, Entienne Swanepoel and Devon Williams were named in the Currie Cup Premier Division squad, but not yet included in a matchday squad.

For each team, (c) denotes the team captain. For each match, the player's squad number is shown. Starting players are numbered 1 to 15, while the replacements are numbered 16 to 22. If a replacement made an appearance in the match, it is indicated by (substituted on) . "App" refers to the number of appearances made by the player, "Try" to the number of tries scored by the player, "Kck" to the number of points scored via kicks (conversions, penalties or drop goals) and "Pts" refer to the total number of points scored by the player.

=== Discipline ===
The following table contains all the cards handed out during the tournament:

Cards
Player	Team	Red card	Temporarily suspended
Rayno Benjamin	Free State Cheetahs	1	2
JP du Plessis	Eastern Province Kings	1	0
Hansie Graaff	Eastern Province Kings	1	0
Luan de Bruin	Free State Cheetahs	0	2
Schalk Ferreira	Eastern Province Kings	0	2
Maks van Dyk	Free State Cheetahs	0	2
Thembelani Bholi	Eastern Province Kings	0	1
Eital Bredenkamp	Eastern Province Kings	0	1
Uzair Cassiem	Pumas	0	1
Ruan Combrinck	Golden Lions	0	1
Faf de Klerk	Pumas	0	1
Rynhardt Elstadt	Western Province	0	1
Carel Greeff	Griquas	0	1
Siyanda Grey	Eastern Province Kings	0	1
Paul Jordaan	Sharks	0	1
Jean Kleyn	Western Province	0	1
Johnny Kôtze	Western Province	0	1
Lappies Labuschagné	Blue Bulls	0	1
Dillyn Leyds	Western Province	0	1
RJ Liebenberg	Griquas	0	1
Hilton Lobberts	Griquas	0	1
Mzamo Majola	Sharks	0	1
Edgar Marutlulle	Eastern Province Kings	0	1
Jacques Momberg	Pumas	0	1
Khwezi Mona	Pumas	0	1
Odwa Ndungane	Sharks	0	1
Jaco Nepgen	Griquas	0	1
Gerhard Olivier	Free State Cheetahs	0	1
Boom Prinsloo	Free State Cheetahs	0	1
Cobus Reinach	Sharks	0	1
JC Roos	Pumas	0	1
Marnus Schoeman	Pumas	0	1
Pierre Schoeman	Blue Bulls	0	1
S'bura Sithole	Sharks	0	1
Kwagga Smith	Golden Lions	0	1
Ruan Steenkamp	Blue Bulls	0	1
Deon Stegmann	Blue Bulls	0	1
Steven Sykes	Eastern Province Kings	0	1
Philip van der Walt	Sharks	0	1
Ewald van der Westhuizen	Griquas	0	1
Chris van Zyl	Western Province	0	1
Henco Venter	Free State Cheetahs	0	1
Stefan Watermeyer	Pumas	0	1
Warren Whiteley	Golden Lions	0	1
* Legend: (red card) = Sent off, (yellow card) = Sin-binned

== Referees ==
The following referees officiated matches in the 2015 Currie Cup Premier Division:

- Stuart Berry
- Rodney Boneparte
- Quinton Immelman
- AJ Jacobs
- Cwengile Jadezweni
- Craig Joubert
- Pro Legoete
- Jaco Peyper
- Rasta Rasivhenge
- Marius van der Westhuizen
- Jaco van Heerden

== See also ==
- 2015 Currie Cup qualification
- 2015 Currie Cup First Division
- 2015 Vodacom Cup
- 2015 Under-21 Provincial Championship Group A
- 2015 Under-21 Provincial Championship Group B
- 2015 Under-19 Provincial Championship Group A
- 2015 Under-19 Provincial Championship Group B
