= Tim Agaba =

Ugandan rugby union player

- Full name: Timothy Ernest Victor Kwizera Agaba
- Born: 23 July 1989 (age 37) Kampala, Uganda
- Height: 1.93 m (6 ft 4 in)
- Weight: 106 kg (234 lb; 16 st 10 lb)
- School: Stirling High School, East London
- University: University of South Africa; Nelson Mandela Metropolitan University

Rugby union career
- Position: Loose forward
- Current team: Carcassonne
Youth career
- 2007: Border Bulldogs
- 2010: Sharks
Amateur team(s)
Years	Team	Apps	(Points)
2012–2014	NMMU Madibaz	15	(10)
Senior career
Years	Team	Apps	(Points)
2013–2015	Eastern Province Kings	28	(20)
2017–2021	Blue Bulls	14	(10)
2018–2021	Bulls	6	(0)
2018–2019	Blue Bulls XV	3	(0)
2021–	Carcassonne		
- Correct as of 13 September 2021
International career
Years	Team	Apps	(Points)
2013	South African Universities	1	(0)
2015–present	South Africa Sevens	75	(65)
- Correct as of 13 April 2018
Medal record
Men's rugby sevens
Representing South Africa
Olympic Games
Bronze medal – third place	2016 Rio de Janeiro	Team competition

Timothy Ernest Victor Kwizera Agaba (born 23 July 1989) is a Ugandan-born South African rugby union player for the Bulls in Super Rugby, the Blue Bulls in the Currie Cup and the Blue Bulls XV in the Rugby Challenge. His regular position is flanker or number eight.

He was a member of the South African Sevens team that won a bronze medal at the 2016 Summer Olympics.

== Career ==
=== Youth : Border and Sharks ===
Agaba was born in Kabale, Southern Uganda, before moving to the Transkei and then East London, where he attended Stirling High School, where he took up rugby. In 2007, he was included in the Border team that played at the premier South African high school rugby union tournament, the Under-18 Craven Week held in Stellenbosch.

After high school, he moved to Durban to join the Sharks, but a series of injuries restricted his playing time for them to two appearances for the Sharks U21s in the 2010 Under-21 Provincial Championship.

=== NMMU and Eastern Province Kings ===
He returned to the Eastern Cape in 2012, where he joined the Port Elizabeth-based university side NMMU Madibaz for the 2012 Varsity Cup competition. He made five appearances for them and scored a try in their 26–42 defeat to Maties.

He established himself as the first-choice eighth man for the NMMU Madibaz during the 2013 Varsity Cup, starting six of their eight matches in the competition as he helped NMMU qualify for the semi-finals of the competition for the first time. He was included in the Eastern Province Kings squad for the 2013 Vodacom Cup competition and made his first class debut for the Kings by starting their 17–13 victory over a Free State XV in Bloemfontein. He also made an appearance off the bench in their match against the Boland Cavaliers in Malmesbury and featured in a match for the South African Universities team that played against Namibia in May 2013.

He was then named in the EP Kings Currie Cup squad and he made his debut in that competition in the opening fixture of the 2013 Currie Cup First Division competition, starting their 13–29 defeat to the Pumas in Port Elizabeth. He started eight of the fourteen matches that the Eastern Province Kings played during the round-robin stage of the competition and scored a try in their 63–7 victory over the Griffons. The EP Kings finished the regular season in second place on the log to set up a semi-final match against the third-placed Leopards. Agaba also started this match and scored a try midway through the second half as the match finished 22-all after regular time, with the Kings eventually prevailing 32–29 after extra time. He also played in the final, which the EP Kings lost 30–53 to the Pumas.

Agaba again started the 2014 season by representing the NMMU Madibaz in the Varsity Cup competition. He scored one try for NMMU in their match against Maties as they qualified for the semi-finals for the second successive year. He was an unused replacement in the semi-final as they lost 18–19 to the NWU Pukke.

The Eastern Province Kings played in the Premier Division of the Currie Cup after the competition was expanded from six teams to eight for the 2014 season. Agaba made his debut at this level in their 24–53 defeat to the Sharks in Round Eight of the competition. He started their 25–45 defeat to Griquas a week later and also their final match of the campaign, which the Eastern Province Kings won, beating the Pumas 26–25 to secure their only victory in the competition.

He made five appearances in the 2015 Vodacom Cup and scored one try in their 45–50 defeat to a Free State XV as the EP Kings finished in fifth spot on the Southern Section log to miss out on a quarter final spot. He remained an important player for the team in the 2015 Currie Cup Premier Division, which saw him score a try in their 25–33 defeat to the Sharks in Durban.

=== South Africa Sevens ===
He left the Kings at the end of 2015, after the non-payment of player salaries allowed him to disengage himself from his contract, and joined the South African Sevens team on a two-year contract.

=== 2016 Summer Olympics ===
Agaba was included in a 12-man squad for the 2016 Summer Olympics in Rio de Janeiro. He was named as a substitute for their first match in Pool B of the competition against Spain, with South Africa winning the match 24–0. He was also named as a replacement for their second match against France, where South Africa secured a 26–0 victory, and promoted to the starting lineup for their final match against Australia. Despite a 5–12 defeat in this match, South Africa still finished top of Pool B to set up a quarter final rematch against Australia, with Agaba named as a replacement in his side's 22–5 victory. He was also named as a reserve for their final two matches; South Africa lost 5–7 in their semi-final match against Great Britain to be eliminated from gold medal contention, but bounced back in their third-place play-off, securing a 54–14 victory over Japan to secure a bronze medal in the competition.

== Statistics ==
As of 9 September 2015

First class career
Season	Teams	Super Rugby		Currie Cup		Vodacom Cup		Other		Total	
Season	Teams	Apps	Pts	Apps	Pts	Apps	Pts	Apps	Pts	Apps	Pts
2013	Eastern Province Kings	—	—	10	10	2	0	—	—	12	10
2013	South African Universities	—	—	—	—	—	—	1	0	1	0
2014	Eastern Province Kings	—	—	3	0	—	—	—	—	3	0
2015	Eastern Province Kings	—	—	4	5	5	5	—	—	9	10
Career Total		—	—	17	15	7	5	—	—	25	20
