= Khwezi Mona =

South African rugby union player

- Full name: Khwezi Jongamazizi Mona
- Born: 8 October 1992 (age 34) East London, South Africa
- Height: 1.81 m (5 ft 11 1/2 in)
- Weight: 112 kg (17 st 9 lb; 247 lb)
- School: Selborne College, East London
- University: University of South Africa

Rugby union career
- Position: Prop
- Current team: Sharks / Sharks (Currie Cup)
Youth career
- 2008–2010: Border Bulldogs
- 2013: Sharks
Senior career
Years	Team	Apps	(Points)
2014	Sharks XV	4	(0)
2015–2018	Pumas	52	(30)
2019–2020	Griquas	14	(10)
2020–2025	Sharks	15	(0)
2020–2025	Sharks (Currie Cup)	19	(0)
2025–	Exeter Chiefs	0	(0)
- Correct as of 23 July 2022
International career
Years	Team	Apps	(Points)
2008	South Africa Under-16 Elite Squad		
- Correct as of 25 March 2015

Khwezi Jongamazizi Mona (born 8 October 1992) is a South African rugby union player for Griquas in the Currie Cup and in the Rugby Challenge. His regular position is prop.

== Career ==
=== Youth ===
Playing as a loose forward during his high school career, Mona represented the Border Bulldogs at the Under-16 Grant Khomo Week competition in 2008 and was also selected in a South African Under-16 Elite squad in the same year. In 2010, he played for Border at the premier school rugby tournament in South Africa, the Under-18 Craven Week competition, held in Welkom.

=== Sharks ===
After finishing high school, Mona moved to Durban to join the Sharks Academy. He moved from loose forward to prop, but found his opportunities limited, with Allan Dell and Maks van Dyk – both of them South African Under-20 players – ahead of him in the pecking order. However, his breakthrough came in 2014, when he was included in the Sharks XV squad for the 2014 Vodacom Cup competition. He made his first class debut by starting their home match against Western Province, helping them to a 25–7 win in Durban. He made three more appearances off the bench in victories over Free State XV, SWD Eagles and their only defeat of the regular season against the Eastern Province Kings.

=== Pumas ===
Mona wasn't named in the Sharks' Currie Cup squad in 2014, however, and at the start of 2015, he moved to Nelspruit to join the Pumas. He made his starting debut for the Pumas in their opening match of the 2015 Vodacom Cup competition, a 57–18 win against the Griffons. He eventually appeared in all ten of the Pumas' matches in a season that saw them win the Vodacom Cup for the first time, beating Western Province 24–7 in the final. Mona also scored one try during the season.

=== Southern Kings ===
In November 2018, Mona joined the Southern Kings during their 2018–19 Pro14 campaign, signing a deal until March 2019.

=== Griquas ===
Mona joined Kimberley-based side Griquas for the 2019 season.

=== Exeter Chiefs ===
On 15 August 2025, Mona would move to England to sign for Exeter Chiefs in the Premiership Rugby competition ahead of the 2025-26 season.
