= Hilton Lobberts =

South African rugby union player

- Born: 11 June 1986 (age 40) Paarl, South Africa
- Height: 1.90 m (6 ft 3 in)
- Weight: 105 kg (16 st 7 lb; 231 lb)
- School: New Orleans Secondary School, Paarl
- University: University of Cape Town

Rugby union career
- Position: Lock / Flanker
Youth career
- 2004: Boland Cavaliers
Senior career
Years	Team	Apps	(Points)
2006–2008	Blue Bulls	37	(25)
2007–2008	Bulls	7	(0)
2009–2012	Western Province	34	(15)
2009–2012	Stormers	5	(0)
2009–2010	→ Boland Cavaliers	17	(0)
2012–2013	San Donà	15	(0)
2013–2016	Griquas	27	(10)
2014–2016	Cheetahs	7	(5)
2017	Free State XV	2	(0)
2017–2019	Pumas	23	(10)
2022	Western Province	1	(0)
- Correct as of 23 July 2022
International career
Years	Team	Apps	(Points)
2004–2005	South Africa Under-19		
2005	South Africa Under-21	10	(5)
2006–2007	South Africa (tests)	2	(0)
2006–2007	South Africa (tour)	2	(0)
2007	Emerging Springboks	1	(0)
- Correct as of 22 April 2018

Hilton Lobberts (born 11 June 1986) is a South African rugby union player for the Pumas in the Currie Cup and Rugby Challenge competitions.

== Career ==
In 2013, he joined Griquas for the 2012 Currie Cup Premier Division season.

Hilton Lobberts starts for the Cheetahs as a replacement for Boom Prinsloo who has been ruled out for the rest of the Super Rugby season.

Hilton Lobberts is a former Springbok(nickname for the South African national rugby union team) flank (loose forward). He played in two test matches for the Springboks.
