= Philip van der Walt =

South African rugby union player

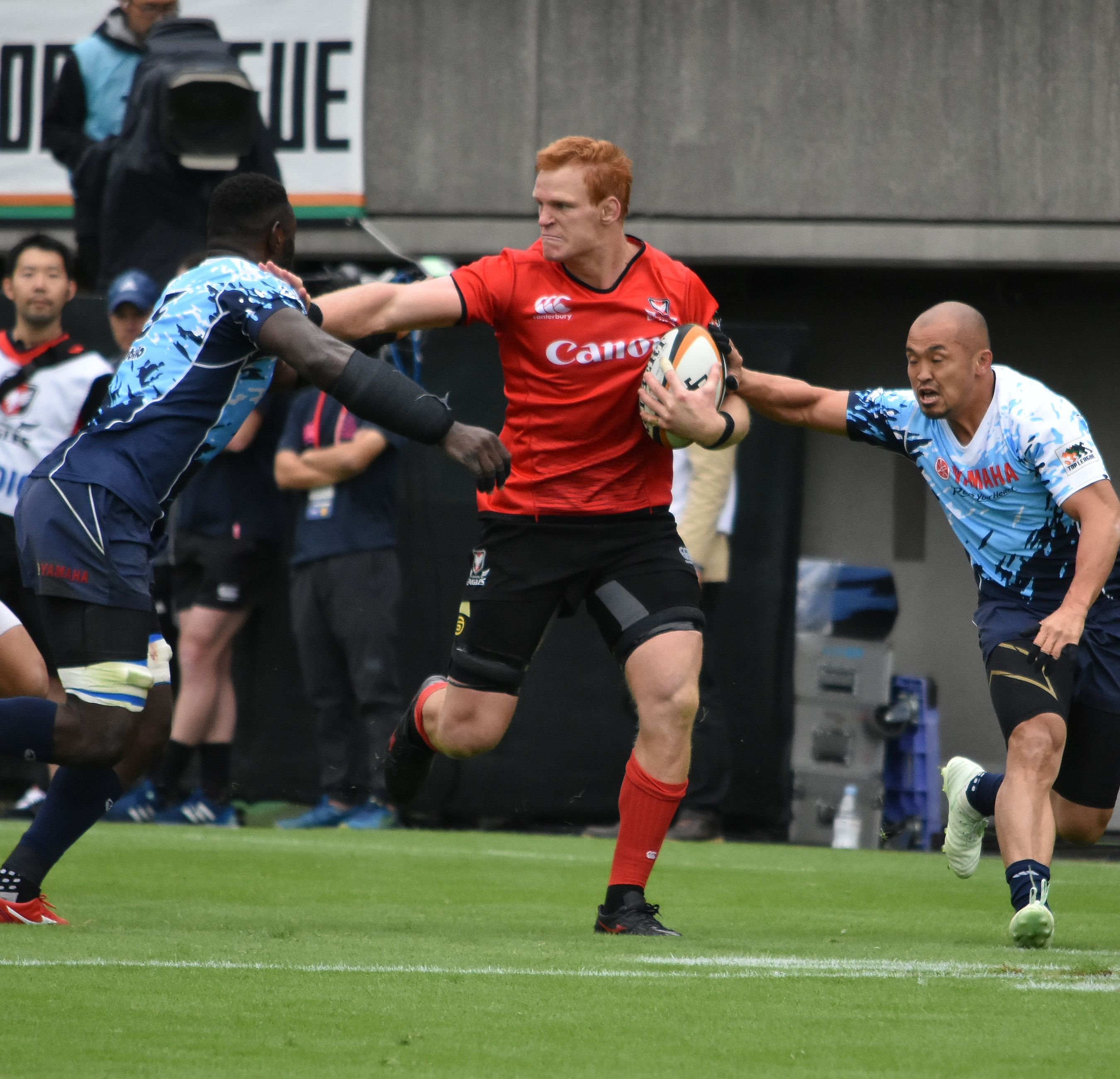
- Full name: Christoffel Philippus van der Walt
- Born: 14 July 1989 (age 37) Adelaide, South Africa
- Height: 1.93 m (6 ft 4 in)
- Weight: 110 kg (17 st 5 lb; 243 lb)
- School: Adelaide Gymnasium
- University: University of the Free State

Rugby union career
- Position: Flanker / Number Eight
- Current team: Newcastle Falcons
Youth career
- 2006–2007: Eastern Province Kings
- 2008–2010: Free State Cheetahs
Senior career
Years	Team	Apps	(Points)
2010–2014	Free State Cheetahs	31	(20)
2011–2014	Cheetahs	49	(25)
2011	→ Griffons	1	(5)
2014–2015	Biarritz	22	(10)
2015–2016	Sharks (Currie Cup)	16	(0)
2015–2019	Sharks	44	(5)
2017–2018	Sharks XV		
2019–	Newcastle Falcons	67	(20)
- Correct as of 8 August 2025

Christoffel Philippus van der Walt (born 14 July 1989) is a South African rugby union footballer. He plays as a number eight for the Newcastle Falcons in the IPA Greene King Championship, having previously played for theSharks in Super Rugby, Cheetahs in Super Rugby, the Free State Cheetahs in the Currie Cup, Biarritz in the French Pro D2 and Canon Eagles in the Japanese Top League.

In 2014, it was announced that Van der Walt would join French Pro D2 side Biarritz on a two-year deal for the 2014–15 Top 14 season.

On 6 June 2015, it was announced that Van der Walt would return to South Africa to join the Sharks for the 2015 Currie Cup Premier Division.

In July 2019, Van Der Walt joined Newcastle Falcons on a three-year deal.
