= Stirling High School, East London =

Stirling High School

Location
- Gleneagles Road, Stirling; East London, Eastern Cape; South Africa

Information
- Type: Public & Boarding
- Motto: Semper Fidelis (Always Faithful)
- Established: 1973; 53 years ago
- Locale: Urban Campus
- School district: District 9
- School number: 043 735 1444
- Headmaster: Doug Prior
- Staff: 100 full-time
- Grades: 8–12
- Gender: Boys & Girls
- Age: 14 to 18
- Enrollment: 1,100 pupils
- Language: English
- Schedule: 07:30 - 14:00
- Campus type: Suburban
- Houses: Beresford; Fincham; Kaizer; Wild
- Colours: Green; White; Gold
- Accreditation: Eastern Cape Department of Education
- School fees: R60,000 (boarding); R33,000 (tuition)
- Website: www.stirlinghigh.co.za

Stirling High School is a public English medium co-educational high school in the suburb of Stirling in East London, Eastern Cape province, South Africa.

The school offers grade 8–12 education and has approximately 1,100 students. Its motto is "Semper Fidelis" (English: Always faithful).

== Notable alumni ==
• Sinalo Jafta - South Africa national women's cricket team wicketkeeper
