= RJ Liebenberg =

South African rugby union player (born 1990)

- Born: 11 December 1990 (age 35) Bethlehem, South Africa
- Height: 1.85 m (6 ft 1 in)
- Weight: 100 kg (15 st 10 lb; 220 lb)
- School: Hoërskool Voortrekker, Bethlehem
- University: University of Johannesburg

Rugby union career
- Position: Flanker / Number Eight
Youth career
- 2006–2008: Griffons
- 2009–2011: Golden Lions
Amateur team(s)
Years	Team	Apps	(Points)
2012–2013	UJ	13	(0)
Senior career
Years	Team	Apps	(Points)
2011	Golden Lions XV	1	(0)
2013–2017	Griquas	63	(5)
- Correct as of 9 October 2016
International career
Years	Team	Apps	(Points)
2013	South African Universities	1	(0)

RJ Liebenberg (born 11 December 1990 in Bethlehem) is a South African rugby union player who most recently played for Griquas. His regular position is eighth man or flanker.

== Career ==
=== Youth and Varsity Cup rugby ===
Liebenberg started his career playing at youth level for the Griffons. He represented them at the Under–16 Grant Khomo Week in 2006, as well as the Under–18 Craven Week tournaments in 2007 and 2008 before playing for the Griffons U19 side in the 2008 Under-19 Provincial Championship competition.

He then moved to Johannesburg, where he played his rugby for the Golden Lions; at Under–19 level in 2009 and at Under–21 level in 2010 and 2011. He also played for university side UJ in the 2012 and 2013 Varsity Cup competitions.

=== Golden Lions ===
His first class debut for the Golden Lions came in a compulsory friendly match against the Falcons prior to the 2011 Currie Cup Premier Division, which turned out to be his only appearance for the team.

=== Griquas ===
His performances in the 2013 Varsity Cup resulted in him being called into the Griquas squad for the 2013 Currie Cup Premier Division. He made his debut for them in their 9–15 loss to the Blue Bulls.
