= Deon Stegmann =

South African rugby union player

- Full name: Gideon Johannes Stegmann
- Born: 22 March 1986 (age 40) Cradock, Eastern Cape, South Africa
- Height: 1.81 m (5 ft 11 1/2 in)
- Weight: 104 kg (16 st 5 lb; 229 lb)
- School: Grey College, Bloemfontein, South Africa

Rugby union career
- Position: Flanker
Youth career
- 2004: Free State Cheetahs
- 2005–2006: Blue Bulls
Senior career
Years	Team	Apps	(Points)
2007–2016	Blue Bulls	76	(85)
2008–2016	Bulls	96	(45)
2016–2019	Honda Heat	4	(10)
- Correct as of 15 January 2017
International career
Years	Team	Apps	(Points)
2010–2011	South Africa	6	(0)
- Correct as of 17 October 2015

Gideon Johannes Stegmann (born 22 March 1986) is a South African professional rugby union player, who most recently played as an openside flank for Honda Heat in the Japanese Top League. He made his Super 14 debut for the Bulls in 2008 at the age of 21.

He made the number 6 jersey his own in 2008 after playing in every Super 14 match and being awarded Bulls Forward of the Year in 2008.

His grandpa is famous springbok player Johannes Augustus Stegmann. He has been one of the Super Rugby's best openside flankers from 2008 to 2011. He regularly leading the tackle count, turnover and work rate stats for the Bulls and has a time of 10.8 seconds in the 100-metre sprint.

At the Bulls, Stegmann plays in a back row combination together with Springbok flank, Dewald Potgieter and Springbok number 8, Pierre Spies, winning 2 Super 14 titles in 2 successive years as well as the Currie Cup.

In 2013, he signed a contract extension to keep him at the Blue Bulls until 2015.

== Education ==
Stegmann attended South Africa's top-ranked rugby school: Grey College, Bloemfontein, where he was selected for the SA schools team. During high school he was a track and field athlete and played number 8 (as well as flank) in Grey College's First XV loose trio, alongside Springbok and Cheetahs flank Heinrich Brüssow, and Cheetahs now Irish international flank Richardt Strauss. Tertiary education: UNISA.

== Springbok career ==
In November 2010, Stegmann was called up to the Springbok squad (outgoing tours) as a replacement to injured Springbok flank and former IRB player of the year Schalk Burger, and was handed his first cap as a Springbok debutant in the starting lineup named to face Ireland on 6 November 2010. The Springboks won and Stegmann subsequently started every match on tour. South Africa obtained a result of 3–1 over the Isles, beating England and Wales and losing to Scotland.

== Squads ==
- Free State (U/18 Craven Week) – 2004
- Vodacom Blue Bulls (Vodacom Cup) – 2005
- Blue Bulls (SA Under 19) – 2005
- Blue Bulls (ABSA Under 21) – 2006
- Vodacom Blue Bulls (Vodacom Cup) – 2007
- Vodacom Blue Bulls (ABSA Currie Cup Premier Div) – 2007
- Vodacom Bulls (Super 14) – 2008
- Vodacom Blue Bulls (ABSA Currie Cup Premier Div) – 2008
- Vodacom Bulls (Super 14) – 2009
- Vodacom Blue Bulls (ABSA Currie Cup Premier Div) – 2009
- Vodacom Bulls (Super 14) – 2010
- South Africa (Outgoing Tours) – 2010
- Vodacom Bulls (Super Rugby) - 2011
- South Africa (Castle Tri Nations) - 2011
- Vodacom Blue Bulls (ABSA Currie Cup Premier Div) - 2011
- Vodacom Bulls (Super 15) - 2012
