= Maks van Dyk =

South African and French rugby union player

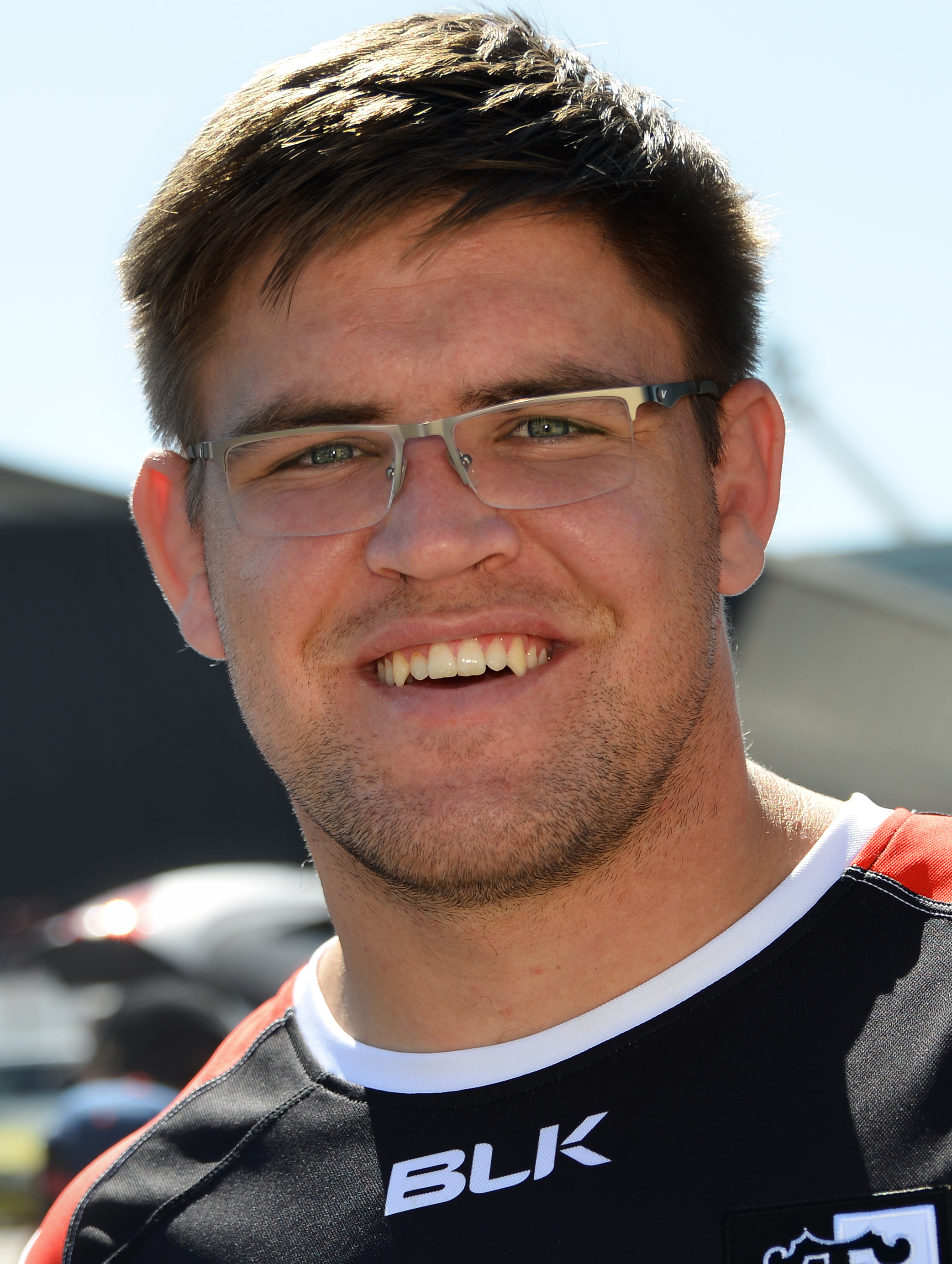
- Full name: Nicolaas Johannes John van Dyk
- Born: 21 January 1992 (age 34) Johannesburg, South Africa
- Height: 1.84 m (6 ft 1/2 in)
- Weight: 118 kg (18 st 8 lb; 260 lb)
- School: Paarl Boys' High School

Rugby union career
- Position: Prop
Youth career
- 2010: Western Province
- 2011: Sharks U19
- 2012–2013: Sharks U21
Senior career
Years	Team	Apps	(Points)
2012–2013	Sharks XV	10	(0)
2014–2016	Cheetahs	39	(0)
2014	Griquas	14	(5)
2014–2015	→ Leinster	1	(0)
2015	Free State Cheetahs	4	(0)
2016–2020	Toulouse	67	(10)
2020	Harlequins	1	(0)
2020	Worcester Warriors	2	(0)
2020 –	Pau	5	(0)
- Correct as of 7 October 2021
International career
Years	Team	Apps	(Points)
2012	South Africa Under-20	4	(0)
2015	Barbarians	1	(0)
- Correct as of 24 January 2014

Nicolaas Johannes John "Maks" van Dyk (born 21 January 1992) is a South African and French professional rugby union player for Houston Sabercats. His regular position is prop.

== Career ==
=== Youth ===
As a scholar at Paarl Boys' High School, Van Dyk represented Western Province at the Under-18 Academy Week and Craven Week competitions in 2010. He then moved to Durban to join the Sharks academy. He played for the Sharks U19 side during the 2011 Under-19 Provincial Championship competition and for the Sharks U21 in 2012 – scoring three tries in the competition – and 2013.

=== 2012 IRB Junior World Championship ===
In 2012, Van Dyk was part of the South Africa Under-20 side that won the 2012 IRB Junior World Championship held in South Africa. He made substitute appearances in the matches against Ireland and England and started the semi-final against Argentina and the final against New Zealand.

=== Sharks ===
Van Dyk made his first two first class appearances for the Sharks XV during the 2012 Vodacom Cup, coming on as a substitute against the Free State XV in Bloemfontein and against the SWD Eagles in Durban.

Van Dyk became a regular in the team during the 2013 Vodacom Cup, starting six of their eight matches (his first senior start coming against Western Province in Cape Town) and coming on as a substitute in the other two.

=== Griquas ===
Van Dyk joined Kimberley-based side Griquas prior to the 2014 season and was also included in the training squad for the Griquas' Super Rugby side, the Cheetahs. He made his Super Rugby debut for the Cheetahs in a 21–20 defeat to the Lions in Bloemfontein.

=== Leinster ===
Van Dyk joined Irish Pro12 side Leinster on a two-month loan deal in November 2014 during the South African rugby off-season. He made his debut in Leinster's 21–11 victory over Irish rivals Connacht in Round 10 of the 2014–15 Pro12, his only appearance for the Dublin-based side.

=== Cheetahs ===
Van Dyk joined Port Elizabeth-based sideEastern Province Kings for the 2015 and 2016 seasons, even though he was still available for theCheetahs during the 2015 Super Rugby season. He joined in pre-season training with the Kings prior to the 2015 Currie Cup Premier Division, but negotiated an early release from his contract and a return to theFree State Cheetahs without playing a match for the Kings.

=== Toulouse ===
Van Dyk moved to France to joinToulouse prior to the 2016–17 Top 14 season.

=== Harlequins ===
In August 2020, it was confirmed that van Dyk had signed a short-term with Harlequins for the remainder of the 2019–20 season.

=== Exeter Chiefs ===
In November 2020 it was announced that van Dyk would join Exeter Chiefs ahead of the 2020–21 season on an initial one-year deal.
