= Boom Prinsloo =

South African rugby union player

- Full name: Johannes Gerhardus Pienaar Prinsloo
- Born: 12 March 1989 (age 37) Bloemfontein, South Africa
- Height: 1.88 m (6 ft 2 in)
- Weight: 101 kg (223 lb; 15 st 13 lb)
- School: Grey College, Bloemfontein
- University: University of the Free State

Rugby union career
- Position: Flank / Number Eight
Youth career
- 2007–2010: Free State Cheetahs
Amateur team(s)
Years	Team	Apps	(Points)
2010	UFS Shimlas	8	(35)
Senior career
Years	Team	Apps	(Points)
2010–2016	Free State Cheetahs	37	(60)
2011	Emerging Cheetahs	1	(0)
2013	Free State XV	3	(25)
2012–2017	Cheetahs	51	(70)
2017–2018	Blue Bulls XV	12	(35)
2017	Blue Bulls	8	(5)
- Correct as of 13 July 2018
International career
Years	Team	Apps	(Points)
2010–2012	South Africa Sevens	7	
- Correct as of 13 April 2018
Medal record
Men's rugby sevens
Representing South Africa
Commonwealth Games
Bronze medal – third place	2010 Delhi	Team competition

Johannes Gerhardus Pienaar "Boom" Prinsloo (born 12 March 1989) is a former South African rugby union player who regularly played as a loose forward. He made 51 appearances for the Cheetahs in Super Rugby from 2012 to 2017, and played domestically for the Free State Cheetahs from 2010 to 2016 and for the Blue Bulls in 2017 and 2018. He also played rugby sevens for South Africa from 2010 to 2012.

He retired from rugby in September 2018.

== Career ==
Prinsloo is a Bloemfontein native and represented the Free State Cheetahs in the Currie Cup and the Cheetahs in Super Rugby.

He previously played for the UFS Shimlas in the 2010 Varsity Cup where he notched up a seven tries in eight appearances and won the competitions' 'Player that Rocks' award.

== International ==
Prinsloo represented the Blitzbokke between 2010 and 2012 and played in a total of 7 IRB Sevens World Series tournaments.
