= List of 2015–16 Super Rugby transfers (South Africa) =

This is a list of player signings and releases involving Super Rugby teams in South Africa prior to the end of the 2016 Super Rugby season.

The release of a player that was included in a 2015 Super Rugby season squad, or the signing of a new player for the 2016 season is listed here regardless of when it occurred. Players that have been confirmed for the 2016 season are also listed, regardless of when they signed for the team.

== Notes ==
- 2015 players listed are all players that were named in the initial senior squad, or subsequently included in a 23-man match day squad at any game during the season.
- (did not play) denotes that a player did not play at all during one of the two seasons due to injury or non-selection. These players are included to indicate they were contracted to the team.
- (short-term) denotes that a player wasn't initially contracted, but came in during the season. This could either be a club rugby player coming in as injury cover, or a player whose contract had expired at another team (typically in the northern hemisphere).
- Flags are only shown for players moving to or from another country.
- Players may play in several positions, but are listed in only one.

=== Bulls ===
Bulls transfers 2015–16
Pos	2015 squad	Out	In	2016 squad
PR	Andrew Beerwinkel (did not play); Dean Greyling; Werner Kruger; Morné Mellett; Trevor Nyakane; Marcel van der Merwe; Dayan van der Westhuizen (did not play); Hencus van Wyk (did not play)	(substituted off) Andrew Beerwinkel (to Blue Bulls); (substituted off) Morné Mellett (retired); (substituted off) Dayan van der Westhuizen (to Blue Bulls)	(substituted in) Lizo Gqoboka (from Eastern Province Kings); (substituted in) Nqoba Mxoli (from Blue Bulls); (substituted in) Pierre Schoeman (from Blue Bulls)	Lizo Gqoboka; Dean Greyling (did not play); Werner Kruger; Nqoba Mxoli; Trevor Nyakane; Pierre Schoeman; Marcel van der Merwe; Hencus van Wyk
HK	Bandise Maku (did not play); Adriaan Strauss; Callie Visagie; Jaco Visagie			Bandise Maku; Adriaan Strauss; Callie Visagie (did not play); Jaco Visagie
LK	Grant Hattingh; Nico Janse van Rensburg; Victor Matfield; Marvin Orie (did not play); RG Snyman (did not play); Flip van der Merwe	(substituted off) Victor Matfield (to (England) Northampton Saints); (substituted off) Flip van der Merwe (to (France) Clermont)	(substituted in) Irné Herbst (from Blue Bulls); (substituted in) Jason Jenkins (from Blue Bulls)	Grant Hattingh; Irné Herbst (did not play); Nico Janse van Rensburg; Jason Jenkins; Marvin Orie; RG Snyman
FL	Arno Botha; Jacques du Plessis; Lappies Labuschagné; Wiaan Liebenberg (did not play); Roelof Smit; Deon Stegmann; Nardus van der Walt (did not play)	(substituted off) Jacques du Plessis (to (France) Montpellier); (substituted off) Wiaan Liebenberg (to (France) Montpellier); (substituted off) Nardus van der Walt (to Griquas)	(substituted in) Nick de Jager (from (England) Saracens); (substituted in) Jannes Kirsten (from Blue Bulls); (substituted in) Freddy Ngoza (from Free State Cheetahs); (substituted in) Jacques Potgieter (from Sharks) (Note: Jacques Potgieter was initially included in the Sharks' squad for the 2016 season. However, in May 2016 – prior to making any appearances in the competition – he got an early release from his Sharks contract and joined the Bulls.)	Arno Botha; Nick de Jager; Jannes Kirsten; Lappies Labuschagné; Freddy Ngoza (did not play); Jacques Potgieter (did not play); Roelof Smit; Deon Stegmann
N8	Jacques Engelbrecht (did not play); Hanro Liebenberg; Pierre Spies	(substituted off) Jacques Engelbrecht (to Southern Kings); (substituted off) Pierre Spies (to (Japan) Kintetsu Liners)	(substituted in) Renaldo Bothma (from Sharks) (Note: Renaldo Bothma was initially included in the Sharks' squad for the 2016 season. However, in March 2016 – prior to making any appearances in the competition – he got an early release from his Sharks contract and joined the Bulls.)	Renaldo Bothma; Hanro Liebenberg
SH	Francois Hougaard; Rudy Paige; Piet van Zyl	(substituted off) Francois Hougaard (to South Africa Sevens)	(substituted in) Ivan van Zyl (from Blue Bulls)	Rudy Paige; Ivan van Zyl; Piet van Zyl
FH	Handré Pollard; Jacques-Louis Potgieter; Tian Schoeman	(substituted off) Jacques-Louis Potgieter (to (France) Lyon)	(substituted in) Francois Brummer (from Cheetahs); (substituted in) Joshua Stander (from Blue Bulls)	Francois Brummer; Handré Pollard (did not play); Tian Schoeman; Joshua Stander (did not play)
CE	JJ Engelbrecht; Ryan Nell (did not play); Burger Odendaal; Jan Serfontein; William Small-Smith (did not play)	(substituted off) JJ Engelbrecht (to (Wales) Ospreys); (substituted off) Ryan Nell (to Boland Cavaliers); (substituted off) William Small-Smith (to Cheetahs)	(substituted in) Dan Kriel (from Blue Bulls); (substituted in) Dries Swanepoel (from Blue Bulls)	Dan Kriel; Burger Odendaal; Jan Serfontein; Dries Swanepoel
WG	Bjorn Basson; Travis Ismaiel; Akona Ndungane (did not play); Jamba Ulengo (did not play)	(substituted off) Akona Ndungane (retired)	(substituted in) Kefentse Mahlo (from Blue Bulls); (substituted in) Luther Obi (from Eastern Province Kings)	Bjorn Basson; Travis Ismaiel; Kefentse Mahlo (did not play); Luther Obi (did not play); Jamba Ulengo
FB	Warrick Gelant (did not play); Jesse Kriel; Duncan Matthews (did not play); Jurgen Visser	(substituted off) Jurgen Visser (to Eastern Province Kings)	(substituted in) SP Marais (from Sharks)	Warrick Gelant; Jesse Kriel; SP Marais; Duncan Matthews (did not play)
Coach	Frans Ludeke	(substituted off) Frans Ludeke (to Fiji (assistant))	(substituted in) Nollis Marais (from Blue Bulls)	Nollis Marais

=== Cheetahs ===
Cheetahs transfers 2015–16
Pos	2015 squad	Out	In	2016 squad
PR	Dolph Botha; Danie Mienie; Caylib Oosthuizen; Coenie Oosthuizen; BG Uys; Ewald van der Westhuizen; Maks van Dyk	(substituted off) Dolph Botha (released); (substituted off) Caylib Oosthuizen (to Eastern Province Kings); (substituted off) Coenie Oosthuizen (to Sharks); (substituted off) Ewald van der Westhuizen (to Griquas)	(substituted in) Aranos Coetzee (from Brive); (substituted in) Luan de Bruin (from Free State Cheetahs); (substituted in) Charles Marais (from Eastern Province Kings); (substituted in) Ox Nché (from UFS Shimlas); (substituted in) Teunis Nieuwoudt (from Free State Cheetahs)	Aranos Coetzee; Luan de Bruin; Charles Marais; Danie Mienie; Ox Nché; Teunis Nieuwoudt (did not play); BG Uys (did not play); Maks van Dyk
HK	Martin Bezuidenhout (did not play); Stephan Coetzee; Elandré Huggett; Torsten van Jaarsveld	(substituted off) Martin Bezuidenhout (released); (substituted off) Stephan Coetzee (released)	(substituted in) Jacques du Toit (from Free State Cheetahs); (substituted in) Joseph Dweba (from Free State Cheetahs); (substituted in) Neil Rautenbach (from Stormers)	Jacques du Toit; Joseph Dweba; Elandré Huggett; Neil Rautenbach (did not play); Torsten van Jaarsveld
LK	Lood de Jager; Armandt Koster (did not play); Boela Serfontein (did not play); Steven Sykes (short-term); Francois Uys; Carl Wegner	(substituted off) Steven Sykes (to Eastern Province Kings)	(substituted in) Justin Basson (from Free State Cheetahs); (substituted in) Reniel Hugo (from Free State Cheetahs); (substituted in) Dennis Visser (from Blue Bulls)	Justin Basson (did not play); Lood de Jager; Reniel Hugo; Armandt Koster; Boela Serfontein (did not play); Francois Uys; Dennis Visser (did not play); Carl Wegner
FL	Jonathan Adendorf (did not play); Willie Britz; Heinrich Brüssow; Tienie Burger; Carel Greeff; Oupa Mohojé; Gerhard Olivier; Boom Prinsloo; Henco Venter	(substituted off) Jonathan Adendorf (to Griquas); (substituted off) Heinrich Brüssow (to (Japan) NTT DoCoMo Red Hurricanes); (substituted off) Carel Greeff (to Eastern Province Kings)	(substituted in) Uzair Cassiem (from Pumas); (substituted in) Hilton Lobberts (from Griquas); (substituted in) Steven Meiring (from Griquas); (substituted in) Paul Schoeman (from Eastern Province Kings)	Willie Britz; Tienie Burger (did not play); Uzair Cassiem; Hilton Lobberts; Steven Meiring (did not play); Oupa Mohojé; Gerhard Olivier (did not play); Boom Prinsloo; Paul Schoeman; Henco Venter
N8	Jean Cook; Niell Jordaan	(substituted off) Jean Cook (to (Italy) Zebre)		Niell Jordaan
SH	Renier Botha; Tian Meyer; Sarel Pretorius; Shaun Venter	(substituted off) Renier Botha (released); (substituted off) Sarel Pretorius (to (Wales) Newport Gwent Dragons)	(substituted in) Zee Mkhabela (from Free State Cheetahs); (substituted in) JP Smith (from Blue Bulls); (substituted in) Ruan van Rensburg (from Free State Cheetahs)	Tian Meyer; Zee Mkhabela (did not play); JP Smith (did not play); Ruan van Rensburg (did not play); Shaun Venter
FH	Francois Brummer; Willie du Plessis; Niel Marais; Joe Pietersen; Elgar Watts (did not play)	(substituted off) Francois Brummer (to Bulls); (substituted off) Willie du Plessis (to (France) Toulon); (substituted off) Joe Pietersen (to Sharks); (substituted off) Elgar Watts (to Eastern Province Kings)	(substituted in) Sias Ebersohn (from (Australia) Force); (substituted in) George Whitehead (from Eastern Province Kings); (substituted in) Fred Zeilinga (from Sharks)	Sias Ebersohn; Niel Marais; George Whitehead; Fred Zeilinga
CE	JW Jonker (did not play); Johann Sadie; Michael van der Spuy; Francois Venter	(substituted off) JW Jonker (to Griquas); (substituted off) Johann Sadie (to Agen)	(substituted in) Joubert Engelbrecht (from Griffons); (substituted in) Reinhardt Erwee (from Free State Cheetahs); (substituted in) Tertius Kruger (from Free State Cheetahs); (substituted in) Nico Lee (from Free State Cheetahs); (substituted in) William Small-Smith (from Bulls)	Joubert Engelbrecht; Reinhardt Erwee (did not play); Tertius Kruger (did not play); Nico Lee; William Small-Smith; Michael van der Spuy; Francois Venter
WG	Rayno Benjamin; Danie Dames; Cornal Hendricks; Sergeal Petersen; Raymond Rhule	(substituted off) Danie Dames (released); (substituted off) Cornal Hendricks (to Stormers)	(substituted in) Maphutha Dolo (from Free State Cheetahs); (substituted in) Gerrie Labuschagné (from Free State Cheetahs)	Rayno Benjamin; Maphutha Dolo (did not play); Gerrie Labuschagné (did not play); Sergeal Petersen; Raymond Rhule
FB	Clayton Blommetjies; Willie le Roux; Coenie van Wyk	(substituted off) Willie le Roux (to Sharks)		Clayton Blommetjies; Coenie van Wyk (did not play)
Coach	Naka Drotské; Franco Smith	(substituted off) Naka Drotské (retired)		Franco Smith

=== Kings ===
Southern Kings transfers 2015–16
Pos	2015 squad	Out	In	2016 squad
PR	—N/a	—N/a	(substituted in) Justin Ackerman (from Golden Lions); (substituted in) Jacobie Adriaanse (from (France) Montpellier); (substituted in) Louis Albertse (from (France) Provence Rugby); (substituted in) Tom Botha (from Eastern Province Kings); (substituted in) Schalk Ferreira (from Eastern Province Kings); (substituted in) Liam Hendricks (from Western Province); (substituted in) Sti Sithole (from SWD Eagles); (substituted in) Vukile Sofisa (from Eastern Province Kings)	Justin Ackerman; Jacobie Adriaanse; Louis Albertse; Tom Botha; Schalk Ferreira; Liam Hendricks; Sti Sithole; Vukile Sofisa (did not play)
HK	—N/a	—N/a	(substituted in) Martin Bezuidenhout (from Cheetahs); (substituted in) Martin Ferreira (from Eastern Province Kings); (substituted in) Edgar Marutlulle (from Eastern Province Kings)	Martin Bezuidenhout; Martin Ferreira; Edgar Marutlulle
LK	—N/a	—N/a	(substituted in) JC Astle (from Sharks (Currie Cup)); (substituted in) Philip du Preez (from (France) Bayonne); (substituted in) Tazz Fuzani (from Eastern Province Kings); (substituted in) Cornell Hess (from Eastern Province Kings); (substituted in) Sintu Manjezi (from Eastern Province Kings); (substituted in) Schalk Oelofse (from SWD Eagles); (substituted in) Tyler Paul (from Eastern Province Kings); (substituted in) Steven Sykes (from Eastern Province Kings)	JC Astle; Philip du Preez (did not play); Tazz Fuzani (did not play); Cornell Hess; Sintu Manjezi; Schalk Oelofse; Tyler Paul (did not play); Steven Sykes
FL	—N/a	—N/a	(substituted in) Thembelani Bholi (from Eastern Province Kings); (substituted in) Chris Cloete (from Pumas); (substituted in) JP Jonck (unattached); (substituted in) Andisa Ntsila (from SWD Eagles); (substituted in) CJ Velleman (from Eastern Province Kings); (substituted in) Stefan Willemse (from Eastern Province Kings)	Thembelani Bholi; Chris Cloete; JP Jonck; Andisa Ntsila; CJ Velleman; Stefan Willemse
N8	—N/a	—N/a	(substituted in) Aidon Davis (from Eastern Province Kings); (substituted in) Jacques Engelbrecht (from Bulls); (substituted in) Junior Pokomela (from Eastern Province Kings)	Aidon Davis; Jacques Engelbrecht; Junior Pokomela (did not play)
SH	—N/a	—N/a	(substituted in) Leighton Eksteen (from SWD Eagles); (substituted in) James Hall (from Eastern Province Kings); (substituted in) Ntando Kebe (from Border Bulldogs); (substituted in) Kevin Luiters (from Eastern Province Kings)	Leighton Eksteen; James Hall; Ntando Kebe; Kevin Luiters
FH	—N/a	—N/a	(substituted in) Louis Fouché (from Eastern Province Kings); (substituted in) Dewald Human (from South Africa Sevens Academy); (substituted in) Theuns Kotzé (from (France) Bourg-en-Bresse); (substituted in) Elgar Watts (from Eastern Province Kings)	Louis Fouché; Dewald Human; Theuns Kotzé (did not play); Elgar Watts
CE	—N/a	—N/a	(substituted in) Lukhanyo Am (from Sharks (Currie Cup)); (substituted in) JP du Plessis (from Eastern Province Kings); (substituted in) Shane Gates (from Eastern Province Kings); (substituted in) Jeremy Ward (from Eastern Province Kings); (substituted in) Stefan Watermeyer (from Eastern Province Kings)	Lukhanyo Am; JP du Plessis; Shane Gates; Jeremy Ward; Stefan Watermeyer
WG	—N/a	—N/a	(substituted in) Siyanda Grey (from Eastern Province Kings); (substituted in) Malcolm Jaer (from Eastern Province Kings); (substituted in) Wandile Mjekevu (from Sharks) (Note: Wandile Mjekevu was initially included in the Sharks' squad for the 2016 season. However, in May 2016 – prior to making any appearances in the competition – he got was released by the Sharks contract to join the Kings on a loan deal for the remainder of the season.); (substituted in) Charles Radebe (from SWD Eagles); (substituted in) Luzuko Vulindlu (from SWD Eagles)	Siyanda Grey; Malcolm Jaer; Wandile Mjekevu; Charles Radebe; Luzuko Vulindlu
FB	—N/a	—N/a	(substituted in) Jaco van Tonder (from Sharks); (substituted in) Jurgen Visser (from Bulls)	Jaco van Tonder; Jurgen Visser
Coach	—N/a	—N/a	(substituted in) Deon Davids (from SWD Eagles)	Deon Davids

=== Lions ===
Lions transfers 2015–16
Pos	2015 squad	Out	In	2016 squad
PR	Ruan Dreyer; Corné Fourie; Julian Redelinghuys; Schalk van der Merwe; Jacques van Rooyen	(substituted off) Schalk van der Merwe (to (France) Montpellier)	(substituted in) Pieter Scholtz (from Golden Lions); (substituted in) Dylan Smith (from Golden Lions); (substituted in) Clinton Theron (from Golden Lions)	Ruan Dreyer; Corné Fourie; Julian Redelinghuys; Pieter Scholtz; Dylan Smith; Clinton Theron; Jacques van Rooyen
HK	Robbie Coetzee; Malcolm Marx; Mark Pretorius; Akker van der Merwe	(substituted off) Mark Pretorius (to SWD Eagles)	(substituted in) Ramone Samuels (from Golden Lions)	Robbie Coetzee; Malcolm Marx; Ramone Samuels; Akker van der Merwe
LK	JP du Preez; Andries Ferreira; Robert Kruger; MB Lusaseni; Franco Mostert; Martin Muller	(substituted off) JP du Preez (to Golden Lions)	(substituted in) Lourens Erasmus (from Golden Lions)	Lourens Erasmus; Andries Ferreira; Robert Kruger; MB Lusaseni (did not play); Franco Mostert; Martin Muller
FL	Stephan de Wit (did not play); Jaco Kriel; Ruaan Lerm; Derick Minnie; Kwagga Smith; Warwick Tecklenburg	(substituted off) Derick Minnie (injured); (substituted off) Kwagga Smith (to South Africa Sevens)	(substituted in) Ruan Ackermann (from Golden Lions); (substituted in) Fabian Booysen (from Golden Lions); (substituted in) Cyle Brink (from Golden Lions)	Ruan Ackermann; Fabian Booysen; Cyle Brink; Stephan de Wit; Jaco Kriel; Ruaan Lerm; Warwick Tecklenburg
N8	Warren Whiteley			Warren Whiteley
SH	Ross Cronjé; Faf de Klerk; Lohan Jacobs; Dillon Smit	(substituted off) Lohan Jacobs (released)		Ross Cronjé; Faf de Klerk; Dillon Smit
FH	Marnitz Boshoff; Elton Jantjies; Jaco van der Walt		(substituted in) Ashlon Davids (from Golden Lions)	Marnitz Boshoff; Ashlon Davids; Elton Jantjies; Jaco van der Walt
CE	Stokkies Hanekom; Alwyn Hollenbach; Lionel Mapoe; Howard Mnisi; Harold Vorster	(substituted off) Alwyn Hollenbach (retired)	(substituted in) Rohan Janse van Rensburg (from Golden Lions); (substituted in) Jacques Nel (from Golden Lions)	Stokkies Hanekom; Rohan Janse van Rensburg; Lionel Mapoe; Howard Mnisi; Jacques Nel; Harold Vorster
WG	Sampie Mastriet; Mark Richards; Courtnall Skosan; Anthony Volmink	(substituted off) Mark Richards (to Eastern Province Kings)	(substituted in) Sylvian Mahuza (from NWU Pukke) (substituted in) Koch Marx (from Golden Lions)	Sylvian Mahuza; Koch Marx; Sampie Mastriet (did not play); Courtnall Skosan; Anthony Volmink
FB	Andries Coetzee; Ruan Combrinck		(substituted in) JW Bell (from Golden Lions)	JW Bell; Andries Coetzee; Ruan Combrinck
Coach	Johan Ackermann			Johan Ackermann

=== Sharks ===
Sharks transfers 2015–16
Pos	2015 squad	Out	In	2016 squad
PR	Lourens Adriaanse; Dale Chadwick; Jannie du Plessis; Thomas du Toit; Tendai Mtawarira; Matt Stevens	(substituted off) Jannie du Plessis (to (France) Montpellier); (substituted off) Matt Stevens (to (France) Toulon)	(substituted in) Gerhard Engelbrecht (from Sharks (Currie Cup)); (substituted in) Coenie Oosthuizen (from Cheetahs); (substituted in) Juan Schoeman (from Sharks (Currie Cup))	Lourens Adriaanse; Dale Chadwick; Thomas du Toit; Gerhard Engelbrecht (did not play); Tendai Mtawarira; Coenie Oosthuizen; Juan Schoeman
HK	Kyle Cooper; Bismarck du Plessis; Monde Hadebe; Franco Marais	(substituted off) Bismarck du Plessis (to (France) Montpellier); (substituted off) Monde Hadebe (to Sharks (Currie Cup))	(substituted in) Chiliboy Ralepelle (unattached)	Kyle Cooper; Franco Marais; Chiliboy Ralepelle
LK	Mouritz Botha; Pieter-Steph du Toit; Stephan Lewies; Giant Mtyanda; Etienne Oosthuizen; Marco Wentzel	(substituted off) Mouritz Botha (to (England) Newcastle Falcons); (substituted off) Pieter-Steph du Toit (to Stormers); (substituted off) Marco Wentzel (released)	(substituted in) Hyron Andrews (from Sharks (Currie Cup)); (substituted in) Ruan Botha (from Stormers); (substituted in) David McDuling (from (Australia) Reds); (substituted in) Tjiuee Uanivi (from (France) Brive)	Hyron Andrews; Ruan Botha; Stephan Lewies; David McDuling; Giant Mtyanda; Etienne Oosthuizen; Tjiuee Uanivi (did not play)
FL	Willem Alberts; Marcell Coetzee; Jean Deysel; Dan du Preez; Khaya Majola; Tera Mtembu	(substituted off) Willem Alberts (to (France) Stade Français)	(substituted in) Keegan Daniel (from (Japan) Kubota Spears); (substituted in) Jean-Luc du Preez (from Sharks (Currie Cup)); (substituted in) Francois Kleinhans (from Sharks (Currie Cup)); (substituted in) Jacques Potgieter (from (Australia) Waratahs); (substituted in) Philip van der Walt (from (France) Biarritz)	Marcell Coetzee; Keegan Daniel; Jean Deysel; Dan du Preez; Jean-Luc du Preez; Francois Kleinhans (did not play); Khaya Majola (did not play); Tera Mtembu; Jacques Potgieter (did not play); Philip van der Walt
N8	Renaldo Bothma; Ryan Kankowski	(substituted off) Ryan Kankowski (to South Africa Sevens)		Renaldo Bothma (did not play)
SH	Michael Claassens (did not play); Conrad Hoffmann; Cobus Reinach; Stefan Ungerer; Cameron Wright	(substituted off) Conrad Hoffmann (to Sharks (Currie Cup)); (substituted off) Cameron Wright (to (France) Montpellier)		Michael Claassens; Cobus Reinach; Stefan Ungerer
FH	Lionel Cronjé; Patrick Lambie; Fred Zeilinga	(substituted off) Lionel Cronjé (released); (substituted off) Fred Zeilinga (to Cheetahs)	(substituted in) Garth April (from Sharks (Currie Cup)); (substituted in) Inny Radebe (from Sharks (Currie Cup))	Garth April; Patrick Lambie; Inny Radebe (did not play)
CE	André Esterhuizen; Waylon Murray; François Steyn; Heimar Williams	(substituted off) Waylon Murray (released); (substituted off) François Steyn (to (France) Montpellier)	(substituted in) Johan Deysel (from Leopards); (substituted in) Paul Jordaan (from Sharks (Currie Cup)); (substituted in) Marius Louw (from Sharks (Currie Cup))	Johan Deysel (did not play); André Esterhuizen; Paul Jordaan; Marius Louw (did not play); Heimar Williams
WG	Lwazi Mvovo; Odwa Ndungane; Paul Perez (did not play); JP Pietersen; S'bura Sithole; Jack Wilson	(substituted off) Paul Perez (released); (substituted off) Jack Wilson (to (New Zealand) Otago)	(substituted in) Wandile Mjekevu (from (France) Perpignan)	Wandile Mjekevu (did not play); Lwazi Mvovo; Odwa Ndungane; JP Pietersen; S'bura Sithole
FB	SP Marais	(substituted off) SP Marais (to Eastern Province Kings)	(substituted in) Curwin Bosch (from Sharks (Currie Cup)); (substituted in) Willie le Roux (from Cheetahs); (substituted in) Joe Pietersen (from Cheetahs); (substituted in) Rhyno Smith (from Leopards)	Curwin Bosch; Willie le Roux; Joe Pietersen; Rhyno Smith
Coach	Gary Gold			Gary Gold

=== Stormers ===
Stormers transfers 2015–16
Pos	2015 squad	Out	In	2016 squad
PR	Oli Kebble; Steven Kitshoff; Vincent Koch; Wilco Louw; Frans Malherbe; Alistair Vermaak	(substituted off) Steven Kitshoff (to (France) Bordeaux)	(substituted in) JC Janse van Rensburg (from (France) Bayonne); (substituted in) JP Smith (from (Australia) Brumbies)	JC Janse van Rensburg; Oli Kebble; Vincent Koch; Wilco Louw; Frans Malherbe; JP Smith; Alistair Vermaak
HK	Bongi Mbonambi; Scarra Ntubeni; Neil Rautenbach; Mike Willemse	(substituted off) Neil Rautenbach (to Cheetahs)		Bongi Mbonambi; Scarra Ntubeni; Mike Willemse
LK	Ruan Botha; Manuel Carizza; Jan de Klerk; Eben Etzebeth; Jean Kleyn; Jurie van Vuuren	(substituted off) Ruan Botha (to Sharks); (substituted off) Manuel Carizza (to (France) Racing 92)	(substituted in) Pieter-Steph du Toit (from Sharks); (substituted in) David Ribbans (from Western Province); (substituted in) JD Schickerling (from Western Province); Chris van Zyl	Jan de Klerk; Pieter-Steph du Toit; Eben Etzebeth; Jean Kleyn; David Ribbans (did not play); JD Schickerling; Jurie van Vuuren (did not play); Chris van Zyl
FL	Schalk Burger; Rynhardt Elstadt; Siya Kolisi; Sikhumbuzo Notshe; Michael Rhodes	(substituted off) Michael Rhodes (to (England) Saracens)	(substituted in) Jacques Vermeulen (from Western Province)	Schalk Burger; Rynhardt Elstadt; Siya Kolisi; Sikhumbuzo Notshe; Jacques Vermeulen (did not play)
N8	Nizaam Carr; Duane Vermeulen	(substituted off) Duane Vermeulen (to (France) Toulon)	(substituted in) Kobus van Dyk (from Western Province)	Nizaam Carr; Kobus van Dyk
SH	Nic Groom; Godlen Masimla; Louis Schreuder		(substituted in) Justin Phillips (from Western Province); (substituted in) Jano Vermaak (from (France) Toulouse)	Nic Groom; Godlen Masimla; Justin Phillips (did not play); Louis Schreuder; Jano Vermaak
FH	Demetri Catrakilis; Kurt Coleman; Robert du Preez; Ryno Eksteen (did not play)	(substituted off) Demetri Catrakilis (to (France) Montpellier)	(substituted in) Jean-Luc du Plessis (from Western Province); (substituted in) Brandon Thomson (from Western Province)	Kurt Coleman; Jean-Luc du Plessis; Robert du Preez; Ryno Eksteen (did not play); Brandon Thomson
CE	Damian de Allende; Juan de Jongh; Jean de Villiers (did not play); Huw Jones; Jaco Taute	(substituted off) Jean de Villiers (to (England) Leicester Tigers)	(substituted in) Daniël du Plessis (from Western Province)	Damian de Allende; Juan de Jongh; Daniël du Plessis; Huw Jones; Jaco Taute
WG	Patrick Howard; Johnny Kôtze; Dillyn Leyds; Seabelo Senatla; Kobus van Wyk	(substituted off) Patrick Howard (to (England) Northampton Saints)	(substituted in) Cornal Hendricks (from Cheetahs); (substituted in) Scott van Breda (from Western Province); (substituted in) Leolin Zas (from Western Province)	Cornal Hendricks (did not play); Johnny Kôtze; Dillyn Leyds; Seabelo Senatla (did not play); Scott van Breda; Kobus van Wyk; Leolin Zas
FB	Cheslin Kolbe; EW Viljoen (did not play)			Cheslin Kolbe; EW Viljoen (did not play)
Coach	Allister Coetzee	(substituted off) Allister Coetzee (to (Japan) Kobelco Steelers)	(substituted in) Robbie Fleck (from assistant coach)	Robbie Fleck

== See also ==
- List of 2015–16 Premiership Rugby transfers
- List of 2015–16 Pro12 transfers
- List of 2015–16 Top 14 transfers
- List of 2015–16 RFU Championship transfers
- List of 2015 SuperLiga transfers
- SANZAAR
- Super Rugby franchise areas
