= 2014 Vodacom Cup =

- Countries: South Africa; Kenya
- Date: 7 March – 16 May 2014
- Champions: Griquas (5th title)
- Runners-up: Golden Lions
- Matches played: 63
- Tries scored: 466 (average 7.4 per match)
- Top point scorer: JC Roos (110)
- Top try scorer: Devon Williams / George Tossel (9)

The 2014 Vodacom Cup was played between 7 March and 16 May 2014 and was the 17th edition of this annual domestic cup competition. This edition of the Vodacom Cup was played between fourteen provincial rugby union teams in South Africa from the Currie Cup Premier and First Divisions, as well as the Limpopo Blue Bulls and Simba XV from Kenya.

== Competition ==
There were sixteen teams participating in the 2014 Vodacom Cup competition. These teams were geographically divided into two sections, with eight teams in each section. Teams played all the teams in their section once over the course of the season, either at home or away.

Teams received four log points for a win and two points for a draw. Bonus log points were awarded to teams that scored four or more tries in a game, as well as to teams that lost a match by seven points or less. Teams were ranked by log points, then points difference (points scored less points conceded).

The top four teams in each section qualified for the title play-offs. In the quarter-finals, the teams that finished first in each section had home advantage against the teams that finished fourth in the other section and the teams that finished second in each section had home advantage against the teams that finished third in the other section. The winners of these quarter finals then played each other in the semi-finals, with the higher-placed team having home advantage. The two semi-final winners then met in the final.

=== Quotas ===
This competition saw the reintroduction of a quota system. Each match-day squad had to contain seven black players. Two of these had to be forwards and five of these had to be in the starting line-up.

== Teams ==
Location of the teams in the 2014 Vodacom Cup
Northern Section
Southern Section

=== Changes from 2013 ===
- The Pampas XV withdrew from the competition due to financial considerations.
- Despite not being included in the preliminary fixtures released by SARU, the Kenya Rugby Union confirmed that they would compete in the competition, where they will play in the Southern Section and be based in Cape Town. That announcement followed months of Kenyan media sources reporting that they would play in the competition pending clearance by the IRB, which was subsequently attained.

=== Team Listing ===
The following teams took part in the 2014 Vodacom Cup competition:

Northern Section
Team	Sponsored Name	Stadium/s	Sponsored Name
Blue Bulls	Vodacom Blue Bulls	Loftus Versfeld, Pretoria	Loftus Versfeld
Falcons	Falcons	Barnard Stadium, Kempton Park	Barnard Stadium
Falcons	Falcons	DP de Villiers Stadium, Sasolburg	DP de Villiers Stadium
Golden Lions	Golden Lions	Ellis Park Stadium, Johannesburg	Ellis Park
Griffons	Down Touch Griffons	North West Stadium, Welkom	North West Stadium
Griffons	Down Touch Griffons	Bultfontein High School, Bultfontein	Bultfontein High School
Griquas	GWK Griquas	Griqua Park, Kimberley	GWK Park
Leopards XV	Leopards XV	Olën Park, Potchefstroom	Profert Olën Park
Leopards XV	Leopards XV	Leeudoring Rugby Club, Leeudoringstad	Leeudoring Rugby Club
Leopards XV	Leopards XV	Klerksdorp Rugby Club, Klerksdorp	Klerksdorp Rugby Club
Limpopo Blue Bulls	Assupol Limpopo Blue Bulls	Old Peter Mokaba Stadium, Polokwane	Old Peter Mokaba Stadium
Pumas	Steval Pumas	Mbombela Stadium, Mbombela	Mbombela Stadium

Southern Section
Team	Sponsored Name	Stadium/s	Sponsored Name
Boland Cavaliers	Regent Boland Cavaliers	Boland Stadium, Wellington	Boland Stadium
Boland Cavaliers	Regent Boland Cavaliers	Ceres	Ceres
Border Bulldogs	Border Bulldogs	Buffalo City Stadium, East London	Buffalo City Stadium
Eastern Province Kings	Eastern Province Kings	Nelson Mandela Bay Stadium, Port Elizabeth	Nelson Mandela Bay Stadium
Eastern Province Kings	Eastern Province Kings	Cradock Rovers Field, Cradock	Cradock Rovers Field
Eastern Province Kings	Eastern Province Kings	Grahamstown	Grahamstown
Free State XV	Toyota Free State XV	Free State Stadium, Bloemfontein	Free State Stadium
Free State XV	Toyota Free State XV	Clive Solomon Stadium, Heidedal	Clive Solomon Stadium
Free State XV	Toyota Free State XV	Old Greys Rugby Field, Bloemfontein	Old Greys Rugby Field
Sharks XV	Cell C Sharks XV	Kings Park Stadium, Durban	Growthpoint Kings Park
(Kenya) Simba XV	Tusker Simba XV	City Park Stadium, Athlone	City Park Stadium
SWD Eagles	SWD Eagles	Outeniqua Park, George	Outeniqua Park
Western Province	DHL Western Province	Newlands Stadium, Cape Town	DHL Newlands
Western Province	DHL Western Province	City Park Stadium, Athlone	City Park Stadium

== Logs ==
The final standings in the pool stages of the 2014 Vodacom Cup were as follows:

=== Northern Section ===
2014 Vodacom Cup Northern Section log
Pos	Team	Pld	W	D	L	PF	PA	PD	TF	TA	TB	LB	Pts	Qualification
1	Pumas	7	7	0	0	322	105	+217	41	14	4	0	32	Quarter-finals
2	Griquas	7	6	0	1	259	134	+125	33	12	3	0	27	Quarter-finals
3	Blue Bulls	7	5	0	2	315	111	+204	43	10	4	2	26	Quarter-finals
4	Golden Lions	7	4	0	3	256	178	+78	36	21	3	1	20	Quarter-finals
5	Leopards XV	7	3	0	4	227	178	+49	29	22	4	2	18	
6	Griffons	7	2	0	5	182	240	−58	23	35	3	1	12	
7	Falcons	7	1	0	6	180	262	−82	25	32	3	1	8	
8	Limpopo Blue Bulls	7	0	0	7	47	580	−533	6	90	0	0	0	

Rules for classification:
- 4 points for a win
- 2 points for a draw
- 1 bonus point for a loss by seven points or less
- 1 bonus point for scoring four or more tries in a match

=== Southern Section ===
2014 Vodacom Cup Southern Section log
Pos	Team	Pld	W	D	L	PF	PA	PD	TF	TA	TB	LB	Pts	Qualification
1	Sharks XV	7	6	0	1	215	120	+95	25	14	3	0	27	Quarter-finals
2	Free State XV	7	5	0	2	279	148	+131	40	17	5	1	26	Quarter-finals
3	SWD Eagles	7	5	0	2	240	164	+76	32	20	4	1	25	Quarter-finals
4	Western Province	7	5	0	2	215	138	+77	32	16	3	0	23	Quarter-finals
5	Eastern Province Kings	7	3	0	4	171	165	+6	22	20	1	2	15	
6	Boland Cavaliers	7	2	0	5	158	197	−39	20	26	2	1	11	
7	Simba XV	7	1	0	6	102	285	−183	14	45	1	2	7	
8	Border Bulldogs	7	1	0	6	124	287	−163	15	42	1	0	5	

Rules for classification:
- 4 points for a win
- 2 points for a draw
- 1 bonus point for a loss by seven points or less
- 1 bonus point for scoring four or more tries in a match

== Fixtures and results ==
The following fixtures were released:

=== Northern Section ===
==== Round one ====
7 March 2014	Falcons	6–26	Pumas	Barnard Stadium, Kempton Park
15:00	Pen: Cecil Dumond 31', 34' (2/3); Cards: Vince Gwavu (yellow card) 51' to 61'; Jacques Verwey (yellow card) 68' to 78'	Report; Scoreboard	Try: Trompie Pretorius 18', 55'; Con: JC Roos 18', 55' (2/2); Pen: JC Roos 3', 27', 59', 68' (4/5)	Referee: Jaco van Heerden

7 March 2014	Leopards XV	16–18	Golden Lions	Olën Park, Potchefstroom
19:10	Try: Rowayne Beukman 19'; Con: Gerhard Nortier 20' (1/1); Pen: Gerhard Nortier 7', 53' (2/3); SW Oosthuizen 15' (1/1); Drop: SW Oosthuizen (0/1); Cards: Brendon Snyman (yellow card) 63' to 73'	Report; Scoreboard	Try: Thabo Mabuza 59', 63'; Con: Willie du Plessis (0/1); Guy Cronjé 64' (1/1); Pen: Willie du Plessis 40' (1/3); Guy Cronjé 78' (1/1)	Referee: Quinton Immelman

8 March 2014	Blue Bulls	24–26	Griquas	Loftus Versfeld, Pretoria
14:30	Try: penalty try 22'; William Small-Smith 51'; Con: Louis Fouché 22' (1/2); Pen: Louis Fouché 29', 34', 56', 75' (4/6); Drop: Louis Fouché (0/1)	Report; Scoreboard	Try: Ederies Arendse 4'; Tian Meyer 9'; Con: Nico Scheepers 5', 10' (2/2); Pen: Francois Brummer 31' (1/2); Jacquin Jansen 73', 79' (2/2); Drop: Francois Brummer 45' (1/3); Cards: Ewald van der Westhuizen (yellow card) 22' to 32'	Referee: Marius van der Westhuizen

8 March 2014	Griffons	62–10	Limpopo Blue Bulls	Bultfontein High School, Bultfontein
15:00	Try: AJ le Roux 8', 80'; Nicky Steyn 19', 43'; Japie Nel 34', 41'; Martin Sithole 61'; Sheldon Erasmus 68', 77'; Norman Nelson 76'; Con: Tertius Maarman 9' (1/2); Wynand Pienaar 35', 44', 76', 78', 80' (5/8)	Report; Scoreboard	Try: Sinethemba Maphaqa 12'; Divan Cronjé 40'; Con: Andy Huysamen (0/2); Cards: Wade Schoor (yellow card) 25' to 36'; Sinethemba Maphaqa (yellow card) 64' to 74'	Referee: Jaco Kotze

==== Round two ====
15 March 2014	Golden Lions	23–22	Falcons	Ellis Park Stadium, Johannesburg
12:40	Try: Willie du Plessis 39'; Ruaan Lerm 64'; Anthony Volmink 74'; Con: Willie du Plessis (0/2); Guy Cronjé 75' (1/1); Pen: Willie du Plessis 52', 59' (2/2)	Report; Scoreboard	Try: Kyle Hendricks 5'; Con: Cecil Dumond 6' (1/1); Pen: Cecil Dumond 10', 48' (2/3); Angus Cleophas 57', 62', 72' (3/3)	Referee: Christie du Preez

15 March 2014	Griquas	20–12	Griffons	Griqua Park, Kimberley
14:00	Try: Rocco Jansen 44'; Marnus Schoeman 59'; Con: Jacquin Jansen 45', 60' (2/2); Pen: Jacquin Jansen 14', 28' (2/3)	Report; Scoreboard	Pen: Louis Strydom 4', 54', 68', 71' (4/4); Cards: Inus Kritzinger (yellow card) 35' to 44'	Attendance: 1,000; Referee: Oregopotse Rametsi

15 March 2014	Limpopo Blue Bulls	10–71	Leopards XV	Peter Mokaba Stadium, Polokwane
15:00	Try: Niyaas Johnson 16'; Con: Andy Huysamen 17' (1/1); Pen: Andy Huysamen 2' (1/1)	Report; Scoreboard	Try: Armandt Liebenberg 9'; George Tossel 11'; Rowayne Beukman 18'; Stairs Mhlongo 24'; Adri Jacobs 33'; SW Oosthuizen 46'; Johan Deysel 48'; Jacques Vermaak 52'; SJ Niemand 72'; John-Roy Jenkinson 77'; Stoof Bezuidenhout 79'; Con: Gerhard Nortier 10', 12', 19', 25', 34', 47', 49', 80' (8/11)	Attendance: 200; Referee: Gerrie de Bruin

15 March 2014	Pumas	22–20	Blue Bulls	Mbombela Stadium, Mbombela
15:00	Try: Renaldo Bothma 19'; Con: JC Roos 20' (1/1); Pen: JC Roos 6', 16', 23' (3/3); Justin van Staden 75', 82' (2/2)	Report; Scoreboard	Try: David Bulbring 44'; Jesse Kriel 79'; Con: Louis Fouché 45', 79' (2/2); Pen: Louis Fouché 58', 72' (2/3)	Attendance: 4,850; Referee: Tahla Ntshakaza

==== Round three ====
21 March 2014	Griffons	5–69	Pumas	North West Stadium, Welkom
14:00	Try: Tertius Maarman 65'; Con: Franna du Toit (0/1)	Report; Scoreboard	Try: Uzair Cassiem 9', 41'; Corné Steenkamp 23'; Trompie Pretorius 29', 55'; Dewald Pretorius 35'; Ruwellyn Isbell 39', 61'; Bernado Botha 71'; Brian Shabangu 79'; Con: JC Roos 10', 24', 30', 36', 42', 56', 62' (7/8); Justin van Staden 72' (1/2); Pen: JC Roos 12' (1/1)	Referee: Christie du Preez

21 March 2014	Griquas	68–13	Limpopo Blue Bulls	Griqua Park, Kimberley
16:00	Try: Hillford Clarke 4', 10', 36'; Thabang Molefe 20'; Ntando Kebe 30'; Gouws Prinsloo 52'; Simon Westraadt 56'; Jaco Nepgen 64', 74'; Carel Greeff 73'; Con: Dustin Jinka 11', 21', 31', 37', 53', 56', 65' (7/8); Gouws Prinsloo 73', 74' (2/2)	Report; Scoreboard	Try: Niyaas Johnson 61'; Con: Andy Huysamen 62' (1/1); Pen: Andy Huysamen 17', 27' (2/3); Cards: Wiehann Uys (yellow card) 9' to 19'; Wade Schoor (yellow card) 40' to 50'; Arno Johnson (yellow card) 71'	Referee: Marius Jonker

22 March 2014	Falcons	29–40	Leopards XV	Barnard Stadium, Kempton Park
15:00	Try: Grant Janke 53'; Sandile Ngcobo 63'; Anrich Richter 76'; Andrew van Wyk 80'; Con: Cecil Dumond (0/4); Pen: Angus Cleophas 17', 20', 38' (3/3); Cards: Jacques Alberts (yellow card) 35' to 45'	Report; Scoreboard	Try: George Tossel 1', 9', 41'; Adri Jacobs 12'; Con: Gerhard Nortier 2', 10', 13', 42' (4/4); Pen: Gerhard Nortier 5', 24', 33', 62' (4/4); Justin Botha (0/1); Cards: Johan Deysel (yellow card) 57' to 67'	Referee: Pro Legoete

22 March 2014	Blue Bulls	22–20	Golden Lions	Loftus Versfeld, Pretoria
16:30	Try: Clyde Davids 9'; Clayton Blommetjies 52'; Jesse Kriel 62'; Con: Louis Fouché 10' (1/2); Tony Jantjies 63' (1/1); Pen: Louis Fouché (0/1); Tony Jantjies 65' (1/2)	Report; Scoreboard	Try: Cyle Brink 17'; Vainon Willis 19'; Con: Elton Jantjies 18', 20' (2/2); Pen: Elton Jantjies 40', 47' (2/2)	Referee: Craig Joubert

==== Round four ====
28 March 2014	Pumas	25–16	Griquas	Mbombela Stadium, Mbombela
19:10	Try: Corné Steenkamp 30'; Con: JC Roos 31' (1/1); Pen: JC Roos 5', 18', 25', 42', 66', 81' (6/8); Drop: JC Roos (0/2)	Report; Scoreboard	Try: Marnus Schoeman 45'; Gouws Prinsloo 77'; Con: Jacquin Jansen (0/1); Gouws Prinsloo (0/1); Pen: Jacquin Jansen 23', 40' (2/3); Cards: Marnus Schoeman (yellow card) 52' to 62'	Referee: Pro Legoete

29 March 2014	Falcons	65–14	Limpopo Blue Bulls	DP de Villiers Stadium, Sasolburg
15:00	Try: Sandile Ngcobo 12'; Jacques Verwey 17', 34', 77'; Coert Cronjé 45', 58'; Andrew van Wyk 27', 66'; Anrich Richter 71'; Lukhanyo Am 79'; Vince Gwavu 83'; Con: Angus Cleophas 13', 28' (2/5); Kyle Hendricks 59', 72' (2/4); Arno Poley 80' (1/2)	Report; Scoreboard	Try: Thulani Mathonsi 30'; Koning Janse van Rensburg 40'; Con: Andy Huysamen 31', 40' (2/2); Cards: Thulani Mathonsi (yellow card) 70' to 80'	Referee: Archie Sehlako

29 March 2014	Leopards XV	26–30	Blue Bulls	Leeudoring Rugby Club, Leeudoringstad
15:30	Try: George Tossel 11'; SJ Niemand 46'; Gerhard Nortier 50'; Con: Gerhard Nortier 12' (1/3); Pen: SW Oosthuizen (0/2); Gerhard Nortier 31' (1/1); Drop: Gerhard Nortier 18' (1/1); SW Oosthuizen (0/1); Justin Botha 74' (1/1); Cards: George Tossel (yellow card) 70'	Report; Scoreboard	Try: Reniel Hugo 60'; Sampie Mastriet 65'; Sidney Tobias 71'; William Small-Smith 75'; Con: Joshua Stander 61', 72' (2/4); Pen: Louis Fouché 3', 28' (2/2)	Attendance: 500; Referee: Tahla Ntshakaza

29 March 2014	Golden Lions	40–37	Griffons	Bill Jardine Stadium, Johannesburg
16:00	Try: Ruaan Lerm 6', 61'; JR Esterhuizen 31'; Thabo Mabuza 38'; Phanta Qinisile 48'; Lourens Erasmus 52'; Con: Willie du Plessis 32', 39', 49', 52', 61' (5/6); Pen: Willie du Plessis (0/1)	Report; Scoreboard	Try: Martin Sithole 16', 81'; Nicky Steyn 34', 75'; Boetie Groenewald 69'; Con: Louis Strydom 17', 34' (2/2); Franna du Toit 82' (1/3); Pen: Louis Strydom 40', 43' (2/4)	Attendance: 1,500; Referee: Marius van der Westhuizen

==== Round Five ====
4 April 2014	Blue Bulls	54–7	Falcons	Loftus Versfeld, Pretoria
15:00	Try: Waylon Murray 2'; Sampie Mastriet 6', 79'; Wimpie van der Walt 15', 62'; Tian Schoeman 26'; Ryan Nell 77'; Con: Tian Schoeman 2', 7', 15', 27', 62' (5/7); Pen: Tian Schoeman 11', 40', 48' (3/3)	Report; Scoreboard	Try: Devlin Hope 18'; Con: Cecil Dumond 19' (1/1); Drop: Arno Poley (0/1)	Attendance: 500; Referee: Stuart Berry

4 April 2014	Griffons	15–35	Leopards XV	North West Stadium, Welkom
17:30	Try: AJ Le Roux 22'; Japie Nel 73'; Con: Franna du Toit 24' (1/2); Pen: Franna du Toit 27' (1/2)	Report; Scoreboard	Try: Stairs Mhlongo 17'; George Tossel 30'; Malan van der Merwe 42'; Armandt Liebenberg 52'; Rowayne Beukman 78'; Con: Gerhard Nortier 18', 31', 43', 53' (4/4); George Tossel 79' (1/1); Cards: Molotsi Bouwer (yellow card) 70'	Referee: Stephan Geldenhuys

5 April 2014	Limpopo Blue Bulls	0–88	Pumas	Peter Mokaba Stadium, Polokwane
12:00	Pen: Andy Huysamen (0/1)	Report; Scoreboard	Try: Ashwin Scott 7', 30', 52'; Jaco Bouwer 12', 23'; De-Jay Terblanche 18'; Dewald Pretorius 41'; Doppies le Roux 50'; Hennie Skorbinski 55'; Frank Herne 66'; Johan Pretorius 68'; Pule Sibiya 75'; Rudi Mathee 73'; Bernado Botha 80'; Con: Justin van Staden 24', 31', 42', 51', 56' (5/10); Johan Pretorius 69', 76', 81' (3/3); Bernado Botha 74' (1/1)	Attendance: 100; Referee: Oregopotse Rametsi

5 April 2014	Griquas	33–18	Golden Lions	Griqua Park, Kimberley
14:00	Try: Ewald van der Westhuizen 9'; Carel Greeff 19'; Ederies Arendse 36'; Con: Gouws Prinsloo 10', 20', 37' (3/3); Pen: Gouws Prinsloo 5', 51', 67', 79' (4/5); Cards: Martin Bezuidenhout (yellow card) 47' to 57'; Janro van Niekerk (yellow card) 60' to 70'	Report; Scoreboard	Try: penalty try 47'; Stephan de Wit 60'; Con: Willie du Plessis 48' (1/2); Pen: Willie du Plessis 12', 30' (2/2)	Attendance: 856; Referee: Jaco Peyper

==== Round Six ====
11 April 2014	Griquas	64–34	Falcons	Griqua Park, Kimberley
15:00	Try: Ederies Arendse 8', 83'; Carel Greeff 16', 29', 33'; Tian Meyer 22'; Rocco Jansen 39'; Jonathan Adendorf 54'; Ligtoring Landman 59'; Dustin Jinka 76'; Con: Francois Brummer 16' (1/3); Jacquin Jansen 30', 34', 40' (3/3); Gouws Prinsloo 55', 60', 84' (3/4); Cards: Ligtoring Landman (yellow card) 18' to 28'	Report; Scoreboard	Try: Peet Vorster 3'; Sandile Ngcobo 49', 62'; Shane Kirkwood 71'; Anrich Richter 80'; Con: Wayne Gardner 4' (1/1); Angus Cleophas 63', 80' (2/4); Pen: Angus Cleophas 25' (1/1); Cards: Marlyn Williams (yellow card) 18' to 28'	Attendance: 1,000; Referee: Rasta Rasivhenge

11 April 2014	Griffons	10–49	Blue Bulls	North West Stadium, Welkom
17:30	Try: Vuyo Mbotho 18'; Con: Franna du Toit 19' (1/1); Pen: Franna du Toit 14' (1/1); Drop: Franna du Toit (0/1)	Report; Scoreboard	Try: Hencus van Wyk 23', 70'; Clayton Blommetjies 30', 49'; Sampie Mastriet 33'; Ryan Nell 43'; Burger Odendaal 79'; Con: Tian Schoeman 24', 34', 50' (3/5); Joshua Stander 71' (1/2); Pen: Tian Schoeman 17', 37' (2/2); Drop: Clayton Blommetjies (0/1)	Referee: Federico Anselmi

12 April 2014	Limpopo Blue Bulls	0–110	Golden Lions	Peter Mokaba Stadium, Polokwane
15:00	Cards: Wickus Davel (yellow card) 30' to 40'	Report; Scoreboard	Try: Stephan de Wit 2', 52'; Selom Gavor 9'; Cyle Brink 11', 53'; Stokkies Hanekom 13'; Nico du Plessis 25', 34'; Ruaan Lerm 29'; Ruhan Nel 31', 47'; Lourens Erasmus 36'; Phanta Qinisile 39'; Chrysander Botha 69', 80'; Caswell Khoza 76'; Con: Willie du Plessis 3', 10', 12', 14', 26', 30', 32', 35', 37', 48', 53', 54', 70', 77', 80' (15/16)	Attendance: 100; Referee: Gerrie de Bruin

12 April 2014	Pumas	44–31	Leopards XV	Kees Taljaard Stadium, Middelburg
15:00	Try: Jacques Momberg 1'; Ruwellyn Isbell 3'; Renaldo Bothma 19'; Rudi Mathee 59', 72'; Con: JC Roos 2', 4', 20', 60', 73' (5/5); Pen: JC Roos 8', 55', 70' (3/4); Drop: JC Roos (0/2)	Report; Scoreboard	Try: George Tossel 33', 49'; SW Oosthuizen 37'; Jacques Vermaak 77'; Con: Gerhard Nortier 34', 39', 50', 78' (4/4); Pen: Gerhard Nortier 58' (1/1)	Referee: Quinton Immelman

==== Round Seven ====
25 April 2014	Blue Bulls	114–0	Limpopo Blue Bulls	Loftus Versfeld, Pretoria
15:00	Try: Waylon Murray 1'; Hencus van Wyk 3'; Clayton Blommetjies 7'; Burger Odendaal 17', 20'; David Bulbring 23'; Wiaan Liebenberg 26', 73'; Jesse Kriel 33'; Sampie Mastriet 35', 38', 76'; Lohan Jacobs 42'; Clyde Davids 49'; Joshua Stander 61'; Reniel Hugo 64'; Arno van Wyk 71'; Kefentse Mahlo 75'; Con: Tian Schoeman 3', 7', 17', 20', 26', 33', 42', 49' (8/12); Joshua Stander 63', 64', 71', 73' (4/6); Cards: Clyde Davids (yellow card) 9' to 19'	Report; Scoreboard	Pen: Andy Huysamen (0/1)	Referee: Eduan Nel

25 April 2014	Falcons	17–41	Griffons	Barnard Stadium, Kempton Park
15:00	Try: Devlin Hope 4'; Etienne Taljaard 64'; Vince Gwavu 67'; Con: Cecil Dumond (0/2); Kyle Hendricks 64' (1/1); Cards: Andrew van Wyk (yellow card) 30' to 40'	Report; Scoreboard	Try: Wynand Pienaar 14', 43'; Martin Sithole 31', 79'; Nicky Steyn 49'; Inus Kritzinger 72'; Con: Franna du Toit 31', 49', 72' (3/5); Wynand Pienaar 43' (1/1); Pen: Franna du Toit 61' (1/1)	Referee: Juan Sylvestre

26 April 2014	Golden Lions	27–48	Pumas	Alberton Rugby Club, Alberton
15:00	Try: Selom Gavor 16'; Stephan de Wit 45'; Ruaan Lerm 57'; Hugo Kloppers 62'; Ruhan Nel 77'; Con: Willie du Plessis 57' (1/5)	Report; Scoreboard	Try: JC Roos 2'; Hennie Skorbinski 23'; Corné Steenkamp 25'; Ruwellyn Isbell 29'; Renaldo Bothma 34', 36'; Giant Mtyanda 72'; Reynier van Rooyen 80'; Con: JC Roos 2', 26', 34', 37' (4/6); Coenie van Wyk (0/2); Pen: JC Roos (0/2)	Referee: Ben Crouse

26 April 2014	Leopards XV	8–32	Griquas	Askari Stadium, Klerksdorp
15:30	Try: George Tossel 55'; Con: Gerhard Nortier (0/1); Pen: Gerhard Nortier 22' (1/1)	Report; Scoreboard	Try: Ederies Arendse 14'; Leon Karemaker 32'; Gouws Prinsloo 48'; Burger Schoeman 76'; Con: Gouws Prinsloo 15', 33', 77' (3/4); Pen: Gouws Prinsloo 5' (1/1); Drop: Francois Brummer 38' (1/1)	Referee: Lourens van der Merwe

=== Southern Section ===
==== Round one ====
7 March 2014	Border Bulldogs	24–46	Sharks XV	Buffalo City Stadium, East London
19:00	Try: Wandile Putuma 22'; Lolo Waka 31'; Makazole Mapimpi 44'; Con: Jeff Taljard 23', 32', 45' (3/3); Pen: Jeff Taljard 28' (1/1)	Report; Scoreboard	Try: Hansie Graaff 10'; Peet Marais 46'; Neil Maritz 51'; Thomas du Toit 55'; Wiehahn Herbst 64'; André Esterhuizen 72'; Con: Fred Zeilinga 11', 47', 56', 64', 72' (5/6); Pen: Fred Zeilinga 36', 78' (2/3)	Referee: Francois Pretorius

8 March 2014	Free State XV	52–47	SWD Eagles	Clive Solomon Stadium, Heidedal
15:00	Try: Henco Greyling 5'; Riaan Smit 19'; Sino Ganto 27'; Don Mlondobozi 30'; Nico Lee 55'; Niel Marais 69'; Con: Riaan Smit 6', 28', 31' (3/4); Niel Marais 56', 70' (2/2); Pen: Riaan Smit 10', 36' (2/2); Niel Marais 48', 76' (2/2); Drop: Riaan Smit (0/1); Cards: Sino Ganto (yellow card) 38' to 48'	Report; Scoreboard	Try: Hentzwill Pedro 17'; Mzwanele Zito 32', 61' penalty try 38'; Mzo Dyantyi 65'; Duwayne Smart 74'; Con: Karlo Aspeling 18', 38', 66', 75' (4/5); Deroy Rhoode (0/1); Pen: Karlo Aspeling 41', 80' (2/3); Drop: Karlo Aspeling 7' (1/2)	Attendance: 500; Referee: Marius Jonker

8 March 2014	Simba XV	17–10	Eastern Province Kings	City Park Stadium, Athlone
15:00	Try: Leonard Mugaisi 11', 46'; Max Adaka 49'; Con: Kenny Andola 46' (1/3); Pen: Kenny Andola (0/2); Cards: Wilson Kopondo (yellow card) 32' (red card) 42'; Edwin Achayo (yellow card) 65' to 75'; Max Adaka (yellow card) 74'	Report; Scoreboard	Try: Claude Tshidibi 2'; Pieter Stemmet 74'; Con: Scott van Breda (0/2); Cards: Vukile Sofisa (yellow card) 37' to 47'	Attendance: 600; Referee: Rodney Boneparte

8 March 2014	Western Province	16–8	Boland Cavaliers	City Park Stadium, Athlone
16:40	Try: Devon Williams 47', 57'; Con: Gary van Aswegen (0/2); Pen: Gary van Aswegen 3', 71' (2/3); Cards: Rayn Smid (yellow card) 39' to 49'	Report; Scoreboard	Try: Franzel September 42'; Con: Eric Zana (0/1); Pen: Eric Zana 36' (1/2); Cards: Martin Dreyer (yellow card) 26' to 37'; Ashton Constant (yellow card) 71'; Cheswin Williams (yellow card) 74'	Referee: Pro Legoete

==== Round two ====
15 March 2014	Sharks XV	25–7	Western Province	Kings Park Stadium, Durban
14:30	Try: André Esterhuizen 9'; Keegan Daniel 53'; Jacques Botes 55'; Con: Fred Zeilinga 10', 54' (2/3); Pen: Fred Zeilinga 50', 61' (2/2)	Report; Scoreboard	Try: JP Lewis 36'; Con: Gary van Aswegen 37' (1/1)	Attendance: 100; Referee: Jaco van Heerden

15 March 2014	Eastern Province Kings	60–6	Border Bulldogs	Rhodes Great Field, Grahamstown
15:00	Try: Eben Barnard 4', 44'; Masixole Banda 22', 27'; Brian Skosana 24'; Dwayne Kelly 39'; Ivan-John du Preez 72'; Selvyn Davids 75'; Sonwabo Majola 77'; Con: Ntabeni Dukisa 5', 23', 25', 40', 76' (5/8); Dwayne Kelly 78' (1/1); Pen: Ntabeni Dukisa 14' (1/2)	Report; Scoreboard	Pen: Jeff Taljard 2', 8' (2/2); Cards: Lolo Waka (yellow card) 13' to 23'	Attendance: 1,200; Referee: Pro Legoete

15 March 2014	Boland Cavaliers	20–28	Free State XV	Wesbank Sports Grounds, Malmesbury
16:00	Try: Ashton Constant 44'; Cheslyn Roberts 79'; Con: Eric Zana 45', 79' (2/2); Pen: Eric Zana 53', 58' (2/3)	Report; Scoreboard	Try: Don Mlondobozi 3'; Wayven Smith 19'; Logan Basson 29'; Zingisa April 73'; Con: Niel Marais 30' (1/4); Pen: Niel Marais 17', 47' (2/2)	Attendance: 3,200; Referee: Quinton Immelman

15 March 2014	Simba XV	7–51	SWD Eagles	City Park Stadium, Athlone
16:00	Try: Wilson Kopondo 80'; Con: Kenny Andola 80' (1/1); Pen: Lyle Asiligwa (0/1); Cards: Kenny Andola (yellow card) 60' to 70'	Report; Scoreboard	Try: Daniel Roberts 2', 62'; Shaun Raubenheimer 16'; Hentzwill Pedro 20'; Duwayne Smart 26', 77'; Janneman Stander 40'; Christo du Plessis 53'; Martin du Toit 65'; Con: Karlo Aspeling 54', 66', 77' (3/7); Deroy Rhoode (0/2); Cards: Karlo Aspeling (yellow card) 11' to 21'	Attendance: 300; Referee: Stephan Geldenhuys

==== Round three ====
21 March 2014	Free State XV	22–23	Sharks XV	Clive Solomon Stadium, Heidedal
15:00	Try: Renier Botha 36'; Don Mlondobozi 42'; Nico Lee 52'; Con: Niel Marais 37', 43' (2/3); Pen: Niel Marais 23' (1/3); Cards: Sino Ganto (yellow card) 67' to 78'	Report; Scoreboard	Try: Hanco Venter 10'; Justin Downey 69'; Con: Fred Zeilinga 11', 70' (2/2); Pen: Fred Zeilinga 21', 32', 74' (3/3)	Referee: Quinton Immelman

22 March 2014	Border Bulldogs	18–17	Simba XV	Buffalo City Stadium, East London
15:00	Try: Jeff Taljard 33'; Makazole Mapimpi 62'; Con: Jeff Taljard 34' (1/2); Pen: Jeff Taljard 50', 57' (2/3); Niell Jacobs (0/1)	Report; Scoreboard	Try: Fabian Olando 4'; Leonard Mugaisi 46'; Con: Kenny Andola 5', 47' (2/2); Pen: Kenny Andola 56' (1/1)	Referee: Stephan Geldenhuys

22 March 2014	Western Province	56–22	Eastern Province Kings	City Park Stadium, Athlone
15:30	Try: Rayn Smid 7', 15', 35'; JP Lewis 31'; Sikhumbuzo Notshe 52'; Rohan Kitshoff 65'; Kyle Lombard 75'; Devon Williams 79'; Con: Gary van Aswegen 32', 36', 53', 66', 80' (5/7); Janco Gunter (0/1); Pen: Gary van Aswegen 26', 45' (2/2)	Report; Scoreboard	Try: Michael Killian 11'; Selvyn Davids 41'; Kuhle Sonkosi 56'; Con: Ntabeni Dukisa 12', 57' (2/3); Pen: Ntabeni Dukisa 22' (1/1); Cards: Vukile Sofisa (yellow card) 70'	Referee: Rodney Boneparte

22 March 2014	SWD Eagles	46–17	Boland Cavaliers	Swellendam
16:00	Try: Duwayne Smart 41', 77'; Shaun Raubenheimer 48'; Quinten Petzer 66'; Hentzwill Pedro 70'; Christo du Plessis 73'; Con: Karlo Aspeling 42', 67', 71', 73' (4/5); Deroy Rhoode 77' (1/1); Pen: Karlo Aspeling 30', 37' (2/3)	Report; Scoreboard	Try: Christian Rust 33'; Tiaan Radyn 57'; Con: Eric Zana 33' (1/1); Christian Rust 57' (1/1); Pen: Eric Zana 17' (1/1)	Referee: Tahla Ntshakaza

==== Round four ====
28 March 2014	Border Bulldogs	16–29	Western Province	Buffalo City Stadium, East London
15:00	Try: Mario Noordman 14'; Con: Jeff Taljard 15' (1/1); Pen: Jeff Taljard 10', 21' (2/3); Niell Jacobs 76' (1/1)	Report; Scoreboard	Try: Rayn Smid 5', 36'; Adrian Roberts 40'; JP Lewis 60'; Devon Williams 73'; Con: Gary van Aswegen 6' (1/3); Adrian Roberts 61' (1/1); Janco Gunter (0/1)	Referee: Christie du Preez

29 March 2014	Sharks XV	27–10	SWD Eagles	Kings Park Stadium, Durban
14:30	Try: Tim Swiel 12'; Monde Hadebe 24'; Neil Maritz 79'; Con: Tim Swiel 13', 25', 79' (3/3); Pen: Tim Swiel 7', 60' (2/4)	Report; Scoreboard	Try: Junior Bester 40'; Con: Karlo Aspeling 40' (1/1); Pen: Karlo Aspeling 53' (1/2); Drop: Karlo Aspeling (0/1)	Referee: Quinton Immelman

29 March 2014	Eastern Province Kings	3–31	Free State XV	Cradock Rovers Field, Cradock
16:00	Pen: George Whitehead 5' (1/1)	Report; Scoreboard	Try: Oupa Mohojé 27'; Nico Lee 59'; Alvin Brandt 72', 81'; Con: Niel Marais 28', 60', 73', 82' (4/4); Pen: Niel Marais 37' (1/1)	Referee: Jaco van Heerden

29 March 2014	Simba XV	19–24	Boland Cavaliers	City Park Stadium, Athlone
16:00	Try: Martin Owila 4'; Dennis Muhanji 43'; Brian Nyikuli 58'; Con: Eden Agero 58' (1/2); Darwin Mukidza 44' (1/1); Cards: Moses Amusala (yellow card) 29' to 39'	Report; Scoreboard	Try: Conway Pretorius 11', 22', 26'; Eric Zana 67'; Con: Eric Zana 27', 68' (2/4)	Referee: Cwengile Jadezweni

==== Round Five ====
4 April 2014	SWD Eagles	23–21	Eastern Province Kings	Outeniqua Park, George
19:00	Try: Alshaun Bock 69'; Shaun Raubenheimer 76'; Con: Karlo Aspeling 69', 76' (2/2); Pen: Karlo Aspeling 2', 10' (2/2); Drop: Karlo Aspeling 78' (1/1); Cards: Hannes Franklin (yellow card) 23' to 33'; Schalk Oelofse (yellow card) 57' to 67'	Report; Scoreboard	Try: Ivan-John du Preez 44'; Ntabeni Dukisa 59'; Con: Masixole Banda 45' (1/2); Pen: Masixole Banda 17', 22', 29' (3/3); Drop: Masixole Banda (0/1); Cards: Lizo Gqoboka (yellow card) 68' to 77'	Attendance: 1,235; Referee: Ben Crouse

5 April 2014	Free State XV	54–17	Border Bulldogs	Free State Stadium, Bloemfontein
12:40	Try: Wayven Smith 10', 33'; Neil Claassen 17'; Nico Lee 37'; Peet Coetzee 45', 56'; Riaan Smit 50'; Luke Cyster 53'; Con: Riaan Smit 11', 18', 34', 38', 51', 54', 57' (7/8); Cards: Renier Botha (yellow card) 74'	Report; Scoreboard	Try: Sipho Nofemele 64'; Wandile Putuma 75'; Lundi Ralarala 77'; Con: Oliver Zono (0/2); Bangi Kobese 78' (1/1)	Referee: Rodney Boneparte

5 April 2014	Boland Cavaliers	27–43	Sharks XV	Ceres
16:00	Try: Danwel Demas 13'; Arno Fortuin 30', 80'; Con: Eric Zana 13', 30' (2/2); Christian Rust 80' (1/1); Pen: Eric Zana 7', 16' (2/2); Cards: Khwezi Mkhafu (yellow card) 33' to 43'	Report; Scoreboard	Try: Jaco van Tonder 19'; Keegan Daniel 36', 78'; Sizo Maseko 54'; Johan Meyer 62'; Tim Swiel 73'; Con: Tim Swiel 36', 54', 62', 73', 78' (5/6); Pen: Tim Swiel 24' (1/3)	Attendance: 6,500; Referee: Jaco Kotze

5 April 2014	Western Province	65–29	Simba XV	Newlands Stadium, Cape Town
16:30	Try: Rohan Kitshoff 3', 58', 75'; Devon Williams 11', 28', 31', 35'; Johnny Kôtze 21'; Carel du Preez 40', 42'; Christo van Wyk 52'; Con: Gary van Aswegen 36', 43' (2/8); Kurt Coleman 53', 58', 76' (3/3)	Report; Scoreboard	Try: Fabian Olando 15'; Tony Onyango 19', 38'; Joshua Chisanga 47'; Con: Kenny Andola 20', 39', 48' (3/4); Pen: Kenny Andola 7' (1/2); Cards: Martin Owila (yellow card) 57' to 67'	Referee: Tahla Ntshakaza

==== Round Six ====
11 April 2014	Border Bulldogs	26–40	SWD Eagles	Buffalo City Stadium, East London
15:00	Try: Sipho Nofemele 5'; Makazole Mapimpi 37'; Thembani Mkokeli 54'; Michael Makase 79'; Con: Mario Noordman 6' (1/1); Bangi Kobese 38', 79' (2/3)	Report; Scoreboard	Try: Hentzwill Pedro 1'; Alshaun Bock 16', 40', 43', 50'; Junior Bester 32'; Con: Karlo Aspeling 17', 33', 40', 44', 51' (5/6)	Referee: Jaco van Heerden

11 April 2014	Eastern Province Kings	28–21	Boland Cavaliers	Nelson Mandela Bay Stadium, Port Elizabeth
19:10	Try: penalty try 39'; Cameron Lindsay 45'; Siphesihle Punguzwa 79'; Con: Ntabeni Dukisa 39', 46' (2/3); Pen: Ntabeni Dukisa 18', 52', 61' (3/4)	Report; Scoreboard	Try: JC Astle 23'; Harlon Klaasen 53'; Con: Christian Rust 54' (1/2); Pen: Christian Rust 8', 43', 60' (3/3); Cards: Martin Dreyer (yellow card) 33' to 43'	Attendance: 0 Referee: Juan Sylvestre

12 April 2014	Simba XV	3–40	Sharks XV	City Park Stadium, Athlone
13:30	Pen: Kenny Andola 60' (1/1); Drop: Kenny Andola (0/1); Cards: Joseph Kang'ethe (yellow card) 44' to 54'	Report; Scoreboard	Try: Neil Maritz 46'; Thomas du Toit 52'; Johan Meyer 59'; Jean-Luc du Plessis 71'; Con: Tim Swiel 47', 53', 59' (3/3); Jean-Luc du Plessis 72' (1/1); Pen: Tim Swiel 3', 12', 14', 19' (4/4)	Referee: Francois Pretorius

12 April 2014	Western Province	28–15	Free State XV	City Park Stadium, Athlone
15:30	Try: Huw Jones 11'; Robert du Preez 47'; Devon Williams 51'; Con: Kurt Coleman 48', 52' (2/3); Pen: Kurt Coleman 33', 39', 65' (3/3)	Report; Scoreboard	Try: Renier Botha 24'; Kevin Stevens 42'; Con: Riaan Smit 25' (1/2); Pen: Riaan Smit 20' (1/1)	Referee: Ben Crouse

==== Round Seven ====
25 April 2014	Sharks XV	11–27	Eastern Province Kings	Kings Park Stadium, Durban
16:30	Try: Sizo Maseko 11'; Con: Jean-Luc du Plessis (0/1); Pen: André Esterhuizen (0/1); Jean-Luc du Plessis 23', 49' (2/2)	Scoreboard	Try: Sergeal Petersen 19'; Ntabeni Dukisa 38'; Brian Skosana 71'; Con: Ntabeni Dukisa 19', 39' (2/2); Kayle van Zyl 72' (1/1); Pen: Ntabeni Dukisa 47' (1/3); Kayle van Zyl 53' (1/1)	Referee: Shaun Veldsman

25 April 2014	SWD Eagles	23–14	Western Province	Outeniqua Park, George
19:00	Try: Daniel Roberts 21'; Alshaun Bock 42'; Con: Karlo Aspeling 22', 43' (2/2); Pen: Karlo Aspeling 18', 45', 69' (3/3); Cards: Quinten Petzer (yellow card) 71'	Report; Scoreboard	Try: Gary van Aswegen 66'; Rohan Kitshoff 79'; Con: Robert du Preez 67', 79' (2/2)	Referee: Rasta Rasivhenge

26 April 2014	Free State XV	75–10	Simba XV	Free State Stadium, Bloemfontein
14:30	Try: Tienie Burger 1'; Zingisa April 7', 14', 20', 42'; Maphutha Dolo 9'; Joubert Engelbrecht 35'; Peet Coetzee 38', 61'; Nico Lee 45', 56'; Renier Botha 50'; Henco Greyling 76'; Con: Pieter-Steyn de Wet 10', 36', 39', 46', 51' (5/11); Sino Ganto (0/2)	Report; Scoreboard	Try: Moses Amusala 80'; Con: Eden Agero 80' (1/1); Pen: Kenny Andola 18' (1/2)	Attendance: 1,000; Referee: Marius van der Westhuizen

26 April 2014	Boland Cavaliers	41–17	Border Bulldogs	Piketberg
16:00	Try: Christian Rust 13', 73'; Albert Trytsman 19'; Franzel September 33'; Arno Fortuin 48'; Clemen Lewis 53'; Con: Christian Rust 14', 20', 54', 74' (4/6); Pen: Christian Rust 7' (1/1)	Report; Scoreboard	Try: Johannes Jonker 30'; Lolo Waka 43'; Con: Bangi Kobese 32', 44' (2/2); Pen: Bangi Kobese 60' (1/1); Cards: Wandile Putuma (yellow card) 71'	Referee: Daniel Fortuin

=== Quarter-finals ===
2 May 2014	Sharks XV	20–27	Golden Lions	KP2, Kings Park, Durban
15:00	Try: Johan Meyer 16'; Jongi Nokwe 77'; Con: Jaco van Tonder 17' (1/1); Duncan Campbell 78' (1/1); Pen: Jaco van Tonder 3', 20' (2/2)	Scoreboard	Try: Stokkies Hanekom 35'; Vainon Willis 48'; Stephan de Wit 54'; Con: Willie du Plessis 36', 49', 55' (3/3); Pen: Willie du Plessis 13', 59' (2/3)	Attendance: 150; Referee: Francois Pretorius

2 May 2014	Pumas	13–8	Western Province	Mbombela Stadium, Mbombela
19:10	Try: JW Bell 36'; Con: JC Roos 37' (1/1); Pen: JC Roos 30' (1/4); Coenie van Wyk 78' (1/1); Drop: JC Roos (0/1)	Report; Scoreboard	Try: Rohan Kitshoff 66'; Con: Gary van Aswegen (0/1); Pen: Gary van Aswegen 64' (1/1)	Referee: Stefan Breytenbach

3 May 2014	Free State XV	21–22	Blue Bulls	Free State Stadium, Bloemfontein
15:00	Try: Maphutha Dolo 9'; Zingisa April 41'; Con: Riaan Smit 10' (1/2); Pen: Riaan Smit 14', 39', 58' (3/3)	Report; Scoreboard	Try: Lohan Jacobs 24'; Con: Tian Schoeman 25' (1/1); Pen: Tian Schoeman 2', 28' (2/3); Tony Jantjies 50', 62', 77' (3/3); Drop: Tian Schoeman (0/1)	Attendance: 1,000; Referee: Rodney Boneparte

3 May 2014	Griquas	84–15	SWD Eagles	Griqua Park, Kimberley
15:00	Try: Tian Meyer 19', 46'; Johnathan Francke 24', 42'; Burger Schoeman 32'; Jonathan Adendorf 48'; Danie Dames 57'; Ewald van der Westhuizen 62', 65'; Rocco Jansen 70'; Ederies Arendse 80'; Con: Gouws Prinsloo 80', 20', 25', 33', 43', 47', 48', 58', 63', 71' (10/11); Pen: Gouws Prinsloo 6', 10', 31' (3/3)	Report; Scoreboard	Try: Shaun Raubenheimer 36'; Hentzwill Pedro 39'; Con: Karlo Aspeling 36' (1/2); Pen: Karlo Aspeling 40' (1/1)	Attendance: 1,000; Referee: Christie du Preez

=== Semi-finals ===
9 May 2014	Pumas	14–15	Griquas	Mbombela Stadium, Mbombela
19:10	Try: Corné Steenkamp 67'; Con: JC Roos (0/1); Pen: JC Roos 8', 43', 73' (3/5)	Report; Scoreboard	Pen: Gouws Prinsloo 32', 40', 61', 80' (4/6); Drop: Francois Brummer 1' (1/1)	Referee: Pro Legoete

10 May 2014	Blue Bulls	15–16	Golden Lions	Loftus Versfeld, Pretoria
16:00	Try: Burger Odendaal 39'; Roelof Smit 74'; Con: Tony Jantjies 40' (1/1); Tian Schoeman (0/1); Pen: Tony Jantjies 50' (1/4)	Report; Scoreboard	Try: Selom Gavor 29'; Con: Willie du Plessis 30' (1/1); Pen: Willie du Plessis 9', 45', 72' (3/4); Drop: Willie du Plessis (0/1)	Attendance: 0 Referee: Quinton Immelman

=== Final ===
16 May 2014	Griquas	30–6	Golden Lions	Griqua Park, Kimberley
19:10	Try: Francois Brummer 37'; Danie Dames 61'; Marnus Schoeman 67'; Con: Gouws Prinsloo 38', 62', 68' (3/3); Pen: Gouws Prinsloo 26', 34' (2/2); Drop: Francois Brummer 6' (1/1)	Report; Scoreboard	Pen: Willie du Plessis 3' (1/3); Drop: Willie du Plessis 21' (1/1)	Referee: Jaco van Heerden

== Winners ==
2014 Vodacom Cup
CHAMPIONS
Griquas
Fifth Title

== Players ==
=== Player statistics ===
The following table contain points which were scored during the 2014 Vodacom Cup season:

Top point scorers
No	Player	Team	T	C	P	DG	Pts
1	JC Roos	Pumas	1	21	21	0	110
2	Gouws Prinsloo	Griquas	3	24	14	0	105
3	Willie du Plessis	Golden Lions	1	26	11	1	93
4	Karlo Aspeling	SWD Eagles	0	22	11	2	83
5	Gerhard Nortier	Leopards XV	1	22	9	1	79
6	Tian Schoeman	Blue Bulls	1	17	7	0	60
7	Tim Swiel	Sharks XV	2	11	7	0	53
8	Riaan Smit	Free State XV	2	12	6	0	52
9	Ntabeni Dukisa	Eastern Province Kings	2	11	6	0	50
10	George Tossel	Leopards XV	9	1	0	0	47
11	Devon Williams	Western Province	9	0	0	0	45
12	Niel Marais	Free State XV	1	9	6	0	41
12	Christian Rust	Boland Cavaliers	3	7	4	0	41
14	Fred Zeilinga	Sharks XV	0	9	7	0	39
15	Gary van Aswegen	Western Province	1	9	5	0	38
16	Eric Zana	Boland Cavaliers	1	7	6	0	37
17	Jeff Taljard	Border Bulldogs	1	5	7	0	36
18	Sampie Mastriet	Blue Bulls	7	0	0	0	35
19	Louis Fouché	Blue Bulls	0	4	8	0	32
20	Zingisa April	Free State XV	6	0	0	0	30
20	Ederies Arendse	Griquas	6	0	0	0	30
20	Alshaun Bock	SWD Eagles	6	0	0	0	30
20	Rohan Kitshoff	Western Province	6	0	0	0	30
20	Nico Lee	Free State XV	6	0	0	0	30
25	Angus Cleophas	Falcons	0	4	7	0	29
26	Jacquin Jansen	Griquas	0	5	6	0	28
27	Kenny Andola	Simba XV	0	7	4	0	26
28	Stephan de Wit	Golden Lions	5	0	0	0	25
28	Carel Greeff	Griquas	5	0	0	0	25
28	Ruaan Lerm	Golden Lions	5	0	0	0	25
28	Hentzwill Pedro	SWD Eagles	5	0	0	0	25
28	Martin Sithole	Griffons	5	0	0	0	25
28	Duwayne Smart	SWD Eagles	5	0	0	0	25
28	Rayn Smid	Western Province	5	0	0	0	25
28	Nicky Steyn	Griffons	5	0	0	0	25
36	Francois Brummer	Griquas	1	1	1	4	22
36	Wynand Pienaar	Griffons	2	6	0	0	22
36	Louis Strydom	Griffons	0	2	6	0	22
39	Masixole Banda	Eastern Province Kings	2	1	3	0	21
39	Franna du Toit	Griffons	0	6	3	0	21
41	Clayton Blommetjies	Blue Bulls	4	0	0	0	20
41	Renaldo Bothma	Pumas	4	0	0	0	20
41	Peet Coetzee	Free State XV	4	0	0	0	20
41	Ruwellyn Isbell	Pumas	4	0	0	0	20
41	Tian Meyer	Griquas	4	0	0	0	20
41	Sandile Ngcobo	Falcons	4	0	0	0	20
41	Burger Odendaal	Blue Bulls	4	0	0	0	20
41	Trompie Pretorius	Pumas	4	0	0	0	20
41	Shaun Raubenheimer	SWD Eagles	4	0	0	0	20
41	Corné Steenkamp	Pumas	4	0	0	0	20
51	Kurt Coleman	Western Province	0	5	3	0	19
51	Tony Jantjies	Blue Bulls	0	2	5	0	19
51	Dustin Jinka	Griquas	1	7	0	0	19
51	Joshua Stander	Blue Bulls	1	7	0	0	19
55	Justin van Staden	Pumas	0	6	2	0	18
56	Andy Huysamen	Limpopo Blue Bulls	0	4	3	0	17
57	Cecil Dumond	Falcons	0	2	4	0	16
58	Rowayne Beukman	Leopards XV	3	0	0	0	15
58	Renier Botha	Free State XV	3	0	0	0	15
58	Cyle Brink	Golden Lions	3	0	0	0	15
58	Hillford Clarke	Griquas	3	0	0	0	15
58	Keegan Daniel	Sharks XV	3	0	0	0	15
58	Arno Fortuin	Boland Cavaliers	3	0	0	0	15
58	Selom Gavor	Golden Lions	3	0	0	0	15
58	Rocco Jansen	Griquas	3	0	0	0	15
58	Jesse Kriel	Blue Bulls	3	0	0	0	15
58	AJ le Roux	Griffons	3	0	0	0	15
58	JP Lewis	Western Province	3	0	0	0	15
58	Makazole Mapimpi	Border Bulldogs	3	0	0	0	15
58	Neil Maritz	Sharks XV	3	0	0	0	15
58	Rudi Mathee	Pumas	3	0	0	0	15
58	Johan Meyer	Sharks XV	3	0	0	0	15
58	Don Mlondobozi	Free State XV	3	0	0	0	15
58	Leonard Mugaisi	Simba XV	3	0	0	0	15
58	Japie Nel	Griffons	3	0	0	0	15
58	Ruhan Nel	Golden Lions	3	0	0	0	15
58	Conway Pretorius	Boland Cavaliers	3	0	0	0	15
58	Phanta Qinisile	Golden Lions	3	0	0	0	15
58	Anrich Richter	Falcons	3	0	0	0	15
58	Daniel Roberts	SWD Eagles	3	0	0	0	15
58	Marnus Schoeman	Griquas	3	0	0	0	15
58	Ashwin Scott	Pumas	3	0	0	0	15
58	Wayven Smith	Free State XV	3	0	0	0	15
58	Ewald van der Westhuizen	Griquas	3	0	0	0	15
58	Andrew van Wyk	Falcons	3	0	0	0	15
58	Hencus van Wyk	Blue Bulls	3	0	0	0	15
58	Jacques Verwey	Falcons	3	0	0	0	15
88	Jean-Luc du Plessis	Sharks XV	1	1	2	0	13
88	Bangi Kobese	Border Bulldogs	0	5	1	0	13
88	SW Oosthuizen	Leopards XV	2	0	1	0	13
88	Jaco van Tonder	Sharks XV	1	1	2	0	13
92	Bernado Botha	Pumas	2	1	0	0	12
93	Kyle Hendricks	Falcons	1	3	0	0	11
93	Johan Pretorius	Pumas	1	3	0	0	11
95	Jonathan Adendorf	Griquas	2	0	0	0	10
95	Eben Barnard	Eastern Province Kings	2	0	0	0	10
95	Junior Bester	SWD Eagles	2	0	0	0	10
95	Chrysander Botha	Golden Lions	2	0	0	0	10
95	Jaco Bouwer	Pumas	2	0	0	0	10
95	Alvin Brandt	Free State XV	2	0	0	0	10
95	David Bulbring	Blue Bulls	2	0	0	0	10
95	Uzair Cassiem	Pumas	2	0	0	0	10
95	Coert Cronjé	Falcons	2	0	0	0	10
95	Danie Dames	Griquas	2	0	0	0	10
95	Clyde Davids	Blue Bulls	2	0	0	0	10
95	Selvyn Davids	Eastern Province Kings	2	0	0	0	10
95	Pieter-Steyn de Wet	Free State XV	0	5	0	0	10
95	Maphutha Dolo	Free State XV	2	0	0	0	10
95	Christo du Plessis	SWD Eagles	2	0	0	0	10
95	Nico du Plessis	Golden Lions	2	0	0	0	10
95	Carel du Preez	Western Province	2	0	0	0	10
95	Ivan-John du Preez	Eastern Province Kings	2	0	0	0	10
95	Thomas du Toit	Sharks XV	2	0	0	0	10
95	Lourens Erasmus	Golden Lions	2	0	0	0	10
95	Sheldon Erasmus	Griffons	2	0	0	0	10
95	André Esterhuizen	Sharks XV	2	0	0	0	10
95	Johnathan Francke	Griquas	2	0	0	0	10
95	Henco Greyling	Free State XV	2	0	0	0	10
95	Vince Gwavu	Falcons	2	0	0	0	10
95	Stokkies Hanekom	Golden Lions	2	0	0	0	10
95	Devlin Hope	Falcons	2	0	0	0	10
95	Reniel Hugo	Blue Bulls	2	0	0	0	10
95	Adri Jacobs	Leopards XV	2	0	0	0	10
95	Lohan Jacobs	Blue Bulls	2	0	0	0	10
95	Elton Jantjies	Golden Lions	0	2	2	0	10
95	Niyaas Johnson	Limpopo Blue Bulls	2	0	0	0	10
95	Armandt Liebenberg	Leopards XV	2	0	0	0	10
95	Wiaan Liebenberg	Blue Bulls	2	0	0	0	10
95	Thabo Mabuza	Golden Lions	2	0	0	0	10
95	Sizo Maseko	Sharks XV	2	0	0	0	10
95	Stairs Mhlongo	Leopards XV	2	0	0	0	10
95	Waylon Murray	Blue Bulls	2	0	0	0	10
95	Ryan Nell	Blue Bulls	2	0	0	0	10
95	Jaco Nepgen	Griquas	2	0	0	0	10
95	SJ Niemand	Leopards XV	2	0	0	0	10
95	Sipho Nofemele	Border Bulldogs	2	0	0	0	10
95	Fabian Olando	Simba XV	2	0	0	0	10
95	Tony Onyango	Simba XV	2	0	0	0	10
95	Dewald Pretorius	Pumas	2	0	0	0	10
95	Wandile Putuma	Border Bulldogs	2	0	0	0	10
95	Burger Schoeman	Griquas	2	0	0	0	10
95	Franzel September	Boland Cavaliers	2	0	0	0	10
95	Hennie Skorbinski	Pumas	2	0	0	0	10
95	Brian Skosana	Eastern Province Kings	2	0	0	0	10
95	William Small-Smith	Blue Bulls	2	0	0	0	10
95	Wimpie van der Walt	Blue Bulls	2	0	0	0	10
95	Jacques Vermaak	Leopards XV	2	0	0	0	10
95	Lolo Waka	Border Bulldogs	2	0	0	0	10
95	Vainon Willis	Golden Lions	2	0	0	0	10
95	Mzwanele Zito	SWD Eagles	2	0	0	0	10
151	Robert du Preez	Western Province	1	2	0	0	9
152	Guy Cronjé	Golden Lions	0	2	1	0	7
152	Dwayne Kelly	Eastern Province Kings	1	1	0	0	7
152	Tertius Maarman	Griffons	1	1	0	0	7
152	Mario Noordman	Border Bulldogs	1	1	0	0	7
152	Adrian Roberts	Western Province	1	1	0	0	7
157	Max Adaka	Simba XV	1	0	0	0	5
157	Lukhanyo Am	Falcons	1	0	0	0	5
157	Moses Amusala	Simba XV	1	0	0	0	5
157	JC Astle	Boland Cavaliers	1	0	0	0	5
157	Logan Basson	Free State XV	1	0	0	0	5
157	JW Bell	Pumas	1	0	0	0	5
157	Stoof Bezuidenhout	Leopards XV	1	0	0	0	5
157	Jacques Botes	Sharks XV	1	0	0	0	5
157	Tienie Burger	Free State XV	1	0	0	0	5
157	Joshua Chisanga	Simba XV	1	0	0	0	5
157	Neil Claassen	Free State XV	1	0	0	0	5
157	Ashton Constant	Boland Cavaliers	1	0	0	0	5
157	Divan Cronjé	Limpopo Blue Bulls	1	0	0	0	5
157	Luke Cyster	Free State XV	1	0	0	0	5
157	Danwel Demas	Boland Cavaliers	1	0	0	0	5
157	Johan Deysel	Leopards XV	1	0	0	0	5
157	Justin Downey	Sharks XV	1	0	0	0	5
157	Martin du Toit	SWD Eagles	1	0	0	0	5
157	Mzo Dyantyi	SWD Eagles	1	0	0	0	5
157	Joubert Engelbrecht	Free State XV	1	0	0	0	5
157	JR Esterhuizen	Golden Lions	1	0	0	0	5
157	Sino Ganto	Free State XV	1	0	0	0	5
157	Hansie Graaff	Sharks XV	1	0	0	0	5
157	Boetie Groenewald	Griffons	1	0	0	0	5
157	Monde Hadebe	Sharks XV	1	0	0	0	5
157	Wiehahn Herbst	Sharks XV	1	0	0	0	5
157	Frank Herne	Pumas	1	0	0	0	5
157	Grant Janke	Falcons	1	0	0	0	5
157	Koning Janse van Rensburg	Limpopo Blue Bulls	1	0	0	0	5
157	John-Roy Jenkinson	Leopards XV	1	0	0	0	5
157	Huw Jones	Western Province	1	0	0	0	5
157	Johannes Jonker	Border Bulldogs	1	0	0	0	5
157	Leon Karemaker	Griquas	1	0	0	0	5
157	Ntando Kebe	Griquas	1	0	0	0	5
157	Caswell Khoza	Golden Lions	1	0	0	0	5
157	Michael Killian	Eastern Province Kings	1	0	0	0	5
157	Shane Kirkwood	Falcons	1	0	0	0	5
157	Harlon Klaasen	Boland Cavaliers	1	0	0	0	5
157	Hugo Kloppers	Golden Lions	1	0	0	0	5
157	Wilson Kopondo	Simba XV	1	0	0	0	5
157	Johnny Kôtze	Western Province	1	0	0	0	5
157	Inus Kritzinger	Griffons	1	0	0	0	5
157	Ligtoring Landman	Griquas	1	0	0	0	5
157	Doppies le Roux	Pumas	1	0	0	0	5
157	Clemen Lewis	Boland Cavaliers	1	0	0	0	5
157	Cameron Lindsay	Eastern Province Kings	1	0	0	0	5
157	Kyle Lombard	Western Province	1	0	0	0	5
157	Kefentse Mahlo	Blue Bulls	1	0	0	0	5
157	Sonwabo Majola	Eastern Province Kings	1	0	0	0	5
157	Michael Makase	Border Bulldogs	1	0	0	0	5
157	Sinethemba Maphaqa	Limpopo Blue Bulls	1	0	0	0	5
157	Peet Marais	Sharks XV	1	0	0	0	5
157	Thulani Mathonsi	Limpopo Blue Bulls	1	0	0	0	5
157	Vuyo Mbotho	Griffons	1	0	0	0	5
157	Thembani Mkokeli	Border Bulldogs	1	0	0	0	5
157	Oupa Mohojé	Free State XV	1	0	0	0	5
157	Thabang Molefe	Griquas	1	0	0	0	5
157	Jacques Momberg	Pumas	1	0	0	0	5
157	Giant Mtyanda	Pumas	1	0	0	0	5
157	Dennis Muhanji	Simba XV	1	0	0	0	5
157	Norman Nelson	Griffons	1	0	0	0	5
157	Jongi Nokwe	Sharks XV	1	0	0	0	5
157	Sikhumbuzo Notshe	Western Province	1	0	0	0	5
157	Brian Nyikuli	Simba XV	1	0	0	0	5
157	Martin Owila	Simba XV	1	0	0	0	5
157	Sergeal Petersen	Eastern Province Kings	1	0	0	0	5
157	Quinten Petzer	SWD Eagles	1	0	0	0	5
157	Siphesihle Punguzwa	Eastern Province Kings	1	0	0	0	5
157	Tiaan Radyn	Boland Cavaliers	1	0	0	0	5
157	Lundi Ralarala	Border Bulldogs	1	0	0	0	5
157	Cheslyn Roberts	Boland Cavaliers	1	0	0	0	5
157	Brian Shabangu	Pumas	1	0	0	0	5
157	Roelof Smit	Blue Bulls	1	0	0	0	5
157	Pule Sibiya	Pumas	1	0	0	0	5
157	Kuhle Sonkosi	Eastern Province Kings	1	0	0	0	5
157	Janneman Stander	SWD Eagles	1	0	0	0	5
157	Pieter Stemmet	Eastern Province Kings	1	0	0	0	5
157	Kevin Stevens	Free State XV	1	0	0	0	5
157	Etienne Taljaard	Falcons	1	0	0	0	5
157	De-Jay Terblanche	Pumas	1	0	0	0	5
157	Sidney Tobias	Blue Bulls	1	0	0	0	5
157	Albert Trytsman	Boland Cavaliers	1	0	0	0	5
157	Claude Tshidibi	Eastern Province Kings	1	0	0	0	5
157	Malan van der Merwe	Leopards XV	1	0	0	0	5
157	Reynier van Rooyen	Pumas	1	0	0	0	5
157	Arno van Wyk	Blue Bulls	1	0	0	0	5
157	Christo van Wyk	Western Province	1	0	0	0	5
157	Kayle van Zyl	Eastern Province Kings	0	1	1	0	5
157	Hanco Venter	Sharks XV	1	0	0	0	5
157	Anthony Volmink	Golden Lions	1	0	0	0	5
157	Peet Vorster	Falcons	1	0	0	0	5
157	Simon Westraadt	Griquas	1	0	0	0	5
249	Eden Agero	Simba XV	0	2	0	0	4
249	Nico Scheepers	Griquas	0	2	0	0	4
251	Justin Botha	Leopards XV	0	0	0	1	3
251	Niell Jacobs	Border Bulldogs	0	0	1	0	3
251	Coenie van Wyk	Pumas	0	0	1	0	3
251	George Whitehead	Eastern Province Kings	0	0	1	0	3
255	Duncan Campbell	Sharks XV	0	1	0	0	2
255	Wayne Gardner	Falcons	0	1	0	0	2
255	Darwin Mukidza	Simba XV	0	1	0	0	2
255	Arno Poley	Falcons	0	1	0	0	2
255	Deroy Rhoode	SWD Eagles	0	1	0	0	2
* Legend: T = Tries, C = Conversions, P = Penalties, DG = Drop Goals, Pts = Points.

== See also ==
- Vodacom Cup
- 2014 Currie Cup Premier Division
- 2014 Currie Cup First Division
- 2014 Currie Cup qualification
