= Sandile Ngcobo (rugby union) =

South African rugby union player

- Full name: Sandile Caleb Ngcobo
- Born: 1 August 1989 (age 37) Alexandra, South Africa
- Height: 1.75 m (5 ft 9 in)
- Weight: 85 kg (13 st 5 lb; 187 lb)
- School: Highlands North Boys' High School
- University: University of Johannesburg

Rugby union career
- Position: Winger
Youth career
- 2007–2010: Golden Lions
Senior career
Years	Team	Apps	(Points)
2012–2014	Falcons	36	(50)
2015	Griquas	6	(5)
- Correct as of 12 October 2015
International career
Years	Team	Apps	(Points)
2016–2018	South Africa Sevens	20	(20)
- Correct as of 14 November 2018

Sandile Caleb "Stix" Ngcobo (born 1 August 1989) is a professional South African rugby union player, previously head coach of the South African Sevens team. His regular position is winger.

== Career ==
=== Golden Lions / UJ ===
Ngcobo first earned a provincial call-up when he represented the Golden Lions at the Under-18 Academy Week tournament in 2007. In 2010, he made two appearances for the Golden Lions U21 side in the 2010 Under-21 Provincial Championship Group A.

Ngcobo was named in the UJ squad for the 2012 Varsity Cup, but failed to make any appearances.

=== Falcons ===
Ngcobo joined Kempton Park-based side the Falcons prior to the 2012 Currie Cup First Division. He made his first class debut by starting the Falcons' Round One defeat to the Griffons, taking just four minutes to score his first senior try, which was ultimately not enough as the Griffons won the match 37–27. He appeared in thirteen of the Falcons' fourteen matches in the competition, starting ten of those. He contributed further tries in their matches against the Border Bulldogs, the Leopards and the Boland Cavaliers as the Falcons struggled to 7th in the eight-team competition.

Ngcobo made five appearances for the Falcons during the 2014 Vodacom Cup competition, scoring on try in their 7–40 defeat to Griquas, before starting on ten matches and playing off the bench twice during their 2014 Currie Cup First Division season. He was not as prolific as the previous season, getting just a single try in their match against the Eastern Province Kings.

Ngcobo was the top try scorer for the Falcons in the 2014 Vodacom Cup, scoring four tries. He scored a try in each of their matches against the Leopards XV and the Limpopo Blue Bulls before getting a brace in their 34–64 defeat to Griquas.

=== Sevens ===
Ngcobo then joined the South Africa Sevens set-up, where he was named the captain of their Academy side, leading them in tournaments such as the Rome Sevens in Italy and the Geneva Sevens in Switzerland.

=== Griquas ===
Ngcobo returned to the 15-man version of the sport when he was released by SARU to represent Griquas in the 2015 Currie Cup Premier Division.
