= Sino Ganto =

South African rugby union player

- Full name: Sinovuyo Ganto
- Born: 24 July 1987 (age 39) Alice, South Africa
- Height: 1.76 m (5 ft 9 1/2 in)
- Weight: 90 kg (14 st 2 lb; 198 lb)
- School: Winterberg Agricultural High School, Fort Beaufort
- University: Intec College

Rugby union career
- Position: Winger / Fullback
- Current team: Free State Cheetahs
Youth career
- 2007: Border Bulldogs
- 2008: Western Province
Amateur team(s)
| Years | Team | Apps | (Points) |
| 2011 | UFH Blues | | |
Senior career
| Years | Team | Apps | (Points) |
| 2010 | Border Bulldogs | 9 | (5) |
| 2011–2012 | Falcons | 16 | (20) |
| 2014 | Free State Cheetahs | 6 | (5) |
| 2014 | Boland Cavaliers | 1 | (0) |
| 2015–present | Free State Cheetahs | 7 | (5) |
- Correct as of 20 May 2015
- Correct as of 1 April 2015

Sinovuyo Ganto (born 24 July 1987) is a South African professional rugby union player currently playing with the Free State Cheetahs. His regular position is winger or full-back. He is also currently the backline coach at the Free State Cheetahs Academy.

== Career ==
=== Youth ===
Ganto started his career at local provincial side the Border Bulldogs, representing the Border U21 squad in the 2007 Under-21 Provincial Championship. He also played rugby sevens for Border.

In 2008, he moved to Cape Town to join Western Province and he represented them in the 2008 Under-21 Provincial Championship, but failed to progress any further.

=== Border Bulldogs ===
He returned to the East London-based Border Bulldogs and was included in their senior squad for the 2010 Currie Cup First Division competition. He made his first class debut for them on 16 July 2010, starting their match against Eastern Cape rivals the Eastern Province Kings, but lost the match 28–42. Ganto scored his first try at first class level in his third match; it proved to be decisive as Border beat the Griffons 22–20 in East London. He made a total of eight appearances in a season that saw Border win just three matches to finish in fifth spot, losing out on a semi-final spot.

He was included in university side UFH Blues' squad that participated in the first edition of the Varsity Shield competition. They didn't have a great start to the competition, finishing in last position with just two victories.

=== Falcons ===
For the second half of 2011, Ganto moved to Kempton Park to join the Falcons prior to the 2011 Currie Cup First Division. He had an immediate impact for his new side, scoring a try in their opening match of the season to help secure a 38–27 home victory over the Griffons. He also scored a try in the return fixture in Welkom, but this time the Griffons ran out 46–21 winners. He started a total of six matches, with his two tries helping the Falcons finish in third spot to qualify for the semi-finals, where they lost 17–48 to the Eastern Province Kings.

He played in five matches for the Falcons in the 2012 Vodacom Cup, his first appearances in that competition, scoring one try against the Leopards in a 31–28 victory, their only win of the campaign. He made four appearances for the Falcons at the start of the 2012 Currie Cup First Division season, again scoring in their match against the Leopards.

=== Free State Cheetahs / Boland Cavaliers ===
His next taste of first class rugby came in the 2014 Vodacom Cup for the Free State XV. He got off to a good start for his new province, scoring a try in their season-opening 52–47 victory against the SWD Eagles, and started a total of six matches.

He wasn't retained for their Currie Cup season, instead making a single appearance for the Boland Cavaliers in their 2014 Currie Cup First Division match against the Griffons.

He was appointed as the backline coach at the newly formed Free State Cheetahs Academy and also remained on as a player, representing the Free State XV in the 2015 Vodacom Cup.
