= Philip du Preez =

South African rugby union player

- Born: 1 August 1993 (age 33) Roodepoort, South Africa
- Height: 2.00 m (6 ft 6 1/2 in)
- Weight: 125 kg (19 st 10 lb; 276 lb)
- School: Hoërskool Monument, Krugersdorp

Rugby union career
- Position: Lock
- Current team: Mont-de-Marsan
Youth career
- 2011: Golden Lions
- 2012: Blue Bulls
- 2013: UFS Shimlas Young Guns
- 2013–2014: Free State Cheetahs
- 2014–2015: Bayonne
Senior career
Years	Team	Apps	(Points)
2014	Free State XV	3	(0)
2016	Eastern Province Kings	6	(0)
2016–present	Mont-de-Marsan	38	(0)
- Correct as of 22 July 2016
International career
Years	Team	Apps	(Points)
2011	South Africa Schools	1	(0)
- Correct as of 28 January 2016

Philip du Preez (born 1 August 1993 in Roodepoort, South Africa) is a South African rugby union player, currently playing for Mont-de-Marsan in the French Pro D2. His regular position is lock.

== Career ==
=== Youth ===
Du Preez attended the Krugersdorp-based Hoërskool Monument, where he earned an inclusion into the Golden Lions squad at the foremost schools rugby union competition in South Africa, the Under-18 Craven Week, held in Kimberley in 2011. He made three appearances as the Golden Lions side qualified to play in the unofficial final match of the competition, there they lost to the Free State Cheetahs.

He was also named in the South African Schools squad at the conclusion of the tournament and came on as a replacement in their match against France which was played in Port Elizabeth as a curtain-raiser to the South Africa versus New Zealand match during the 2011 Tri Nations Series.

After high school, Du Preez was included in the Blue Bulls U19 squad that participated in the 2012 Under-19 Provincial Championship, but he made just a single appearance in their 45–14 victory over the Free State U19s in Bloemfontein. A Gilmore's groin ruled him out for much of the year.

=== Free State Cheetahs ===
He permanently moved to Bloemfontein for 2013 to join the Free State Cheetahs academy based at the University of the Free State. He represented the UFS Shimlas Young Guns during the 2013 Varsity Cup Young Guns competition. He started all three of their matches during the regular season – against UP Tuks Young Guns, NWU Pukke Young Guns and Wits Young Guns – as well as their semi-final defeat to Maties Juniors. In the second half of the year, he made one start and six appearances as a replacement for the Free State U21s during the 2013 Under-21 Provincial Championship, as the side finished in fifth position on the log to miss out on the title play-offs.

In 2014, Du Preez was included in the Free State XV squad that participated in the 2014 Vodacom Cup competition. He made his first class debut in their 52–47 victory over the SWD Eagles in George in the opening match of the competition. He was used as a replacement in their matches against the Boland Cavaliers and Simba XV, helping the Free State XV finish in second position on the Southern Section log to qualify for the play-offs. He wasn't involved in their quarter final match, where the Blue Bulls eliminated them form the competition by winning 22–21 in Bloemfontein.

He made a further six (Note: While the match scoreboard on the South African Rugby Union site lists Du Preez as an unused replacement in the match between Blue Bulls U21 and Free State U21, photos taken during the match show that he did indeed appear during the match.) appearances for a Free State U21 side that finished in fourth position on the 2014 Under-21 Provincial Championship log before being eliminated by Western Province U21 in the semi-finals.

=== Bayonne ===
At the start of 2015, Du Preez moved to French Pro Rugby D2 side, where he joined the youth team (Espoirs) of Basque side Bayonne on a trial period for the remainder of the 2014–2015 season. He was in the starting line-up for their matches against Agen, Brive, Clermont, Montpellier, Pau, Perpignon, Toulon and Toulouse, missing their match against Bordeaux due to concussion.

=== Southern Kings ===
On 25 January 2016, the Port Elizabeth-based Southern Kings Super Rugby franchise announced that Du Preez joined them ahead of the 2016 Super Rugby season. He also appeared for George based union the SWD Eagles during their preparations for the 2016 Currie Cup qualification series.

=== Mont-de-Marsan ===
In June 2016, French Rugby Pro D2 side Mont-de-Marsan announced that Du Preez would join them for the 2016–2017 season.
