= Renier Botha =

South African rugby union player

- Born: 28 September 1992 (age 34) Bloemfontein, South Africa
- Height: 1.73 m (5 ft 8 in)
- Weight: 73 kg (11 st 7 lb; 161 lb)
- School: Diamantveld High School, Kimberley
- University: University of the Free State

Rugby union career
- Position: Scrum-half
Youth career
- 2010: Griquas
- 2013: Free State Cheetahs
- 2013: → Griquas
Amateur team(s)
| Years | Team | Apps | (Points) |
| 2013–2016 | UFS Shimlas | 17 | (15) |
Senior career
| Years | Team | Apps | (Points) |
| 2014–2016 | Free State XV | 14 | (15) |
| 2014 | Cheetahs | 1 | (0) |
| 2016–2018 | Griquas | 31 | (50) |
- Correct as of 30 April 2018

Renier Botha (born 28 September 1992) is a South African professional rugby union player who last played forGriquas in the Currie Cup and in the Rugby Challenge. His regular position is scrum-half.

== Career ==
=== Youth and Varsity rugby ===
After playing high school rugby with Kimberley-based Diamantveld High School, Botha was included in the Griquas squad for the 2010 Under-18 Craven Week tournament in Welkom. He also made one appearance for the Griquas U19 side in the Under-19 provincial championships.

Botha went to the University of the Free State, playing club rugby for them and making their Varsity Cup squad for the 2013 Varsity Cup. He made four starts for the side, scoring one try against the NWU Pukke. Towards the end of the season, Botha also made three appearances for former side Griquas U21 in the 2013 Under-21 Provincial Championship competition, playing as a centre.

Botha didn't make the UFS Shimlas squad for the 2014 Varsity Cup, instead playing Vodacom Cup rugby for the Free State XV.

=== Free State Cheetahs ===
Botha made his first class debut during the 2014 Vodacom Cup competition, eventually playing in all eight matches of the Free State XV's season. He started their opening match of the season against the SWD Eagles and scored his first points in senior rugby when he got a try shortly before half-time in their match against the Sharks XV, one of three tries he scored during the campaign.

With no Currie Cup experience, Botha was a surprise inclusion on the bench for the Cheetahs' match against the Brumbies during the 2014 Super Rugby season. He got the opportunity due to an injury to first choice scrum-half Sarel Pretorius and with Griquas scrum-half Tian Meyer being involved in the 2014 Vodacom Cup final.

=== Griquas ===
Botha moved to Kimberley during 2016 to join Griquas.
