= Devlin Hope =

South African rugby union player

- Born: 27 April 1990 (age 36) Johannesburg, South Africa
- Height: 1.80 m (5 ft 11 in)
- Weight: 103 kg (227 lb; 16 st 3 lb)
- School: Bryanston High School
- University: University of Johannesburg; University of Pretoria
- Notable relative: Eddie Lewis (grandfather)

Rugby union career
- Position: Hooker
- Current team: Wimbledon Rugby Club
Amateur team(s)
Years	Team	Apps	(Points)
2015–2016	Coventry	25	(30)
2017–2020	Esher	87	(45)
2022–2024	Barnes RFC	6	(0)
2024-present day	Esher	87	(9)
Senior career
Years	Team	Apps	(Points)
2013–2015	Falcons	17	(10)
2016–2017	London Scottish	3	(0)
- Correct as of 19 September 2022

Devlin Hope (born 27 April 1990 in Johannesburg, South Africa) is a South African rugby union player, currently playing with English National League 1 side Esher. His regular position is hooker.

== Rugby career ==
After playing first class rugby union in his native South Africa for the Falcons, making 17 appearances and scoring two tries for the team from the East Rand between 2013 and 2015, Hope moved to England, where he joined National League 1 side Coventry for the 2015–2016 season.

After one season at that level, he signed with RFU Championship side London Scottish for the 2016–17 season.

== Personal life ==
Hope is the grandson of English footballer Eddie Lewis.
