= Dewald Pretorius (rugby union) =

South African rugby union player

- Full name: Dawid Petrus Pretorius
- Born: 25 November 1986 (age 39) Welkom, South Africa
- Height: 1.87 m (6 ft 1 1/2 in)
- Weight: 111 kg (17 st 7 lb; 245 lb)
- School: Stilfontein High School, Stilfontein

Rugby union career
- Position: Centre / Winger
Youth career
- 2006–2007: Blue Bulls
Senior career
Years	Team	Apps	(Points)
2007	Blue Bulls	3	(10)
2008	Falcons	14	(20)
2009–2010	Griquas	20	(50)
2011–2014	Pumas	40	(45)
2014	Falcons	5	(0)
2015	Pumas	1	(0)
2015	Griffons	5	(0)
- Correct as of 30 July 2015

Dawid Petrus 'Dewald' Pretorius (born 29 November 1986) is a South African rugby union footballer. He plays mostly as a centre or wing. He most recently represented the Griffons in the Currie Cup, having previously played for the Blue Bulls, Falcons, Griquas and Pumas.

He was a member of the Pumas side that won the Vodacom Cup for the first time in 2015, beating Western Province 24–7 in the final. Pretorius made a single appearance during the season.
