= Stephan de Wit =

South African rugby union player

- Full name: Allen Stephan de Wit
- Born: 1 January 1992 (age 34) Vereeniging, South Africa
- Height: 1.86 m (6 ft 1 in)
- Weight: 104 kg (16 st 5 lb; 229 lb)
- School: Transvalia
- University: UJ
- Occupation: Professional Rugby Player

Rugby union career
- Position: Flanker
- Current team: Lokomotiv Penza
Youth career
- 2008–2010: Falcons
- 2011–2013: Golden Lions
Amateur team(s)
Years	Team	Apps	(Points)
2013	UJ	2	(0)
Senior career
Years	Team	Apps	(Points)
2012–2016	Golden Lions XV	29	(55)
2014–2016	Lions	4	(0)
2015–2016	Golden Lions	16	(10)
2017–2018	Stormers	1	(0)
2017	Western Province	13	(15)
2018–2019	Southern Kings	9	(0)
2019–2019	Eastern Province Elephants	10	(15)
2019–2020	Strela-Agro Kazan Rugby	17	(30)
2021–2022	VVA Podmoskvye	28	(55)
2022-Present	Lokomotiv Penza	87	(85)

Allen Stephan de Wit (born 1 January 1992) is a South African professional rugby player, currently playing for the Lokomotive rugby team in Penza, Russia. His regular position is flanker.

== Career ==
=== Youth and Varsity rugby ===
De Wit appeared for the Falcons at several youth tournaments, including the Under-16 Grant Khomo Week in 2008 and the Under-18 Craven Week tournament in both 2009 and 2010.

He then moved to Johannesburg-based side the Golden Lions in 2011, where he participated in the 2011 Under-19 Provincial Championship tournament. He also represented them at Under-21 level in 2012 and 2013.

He also made two appearances for UJ in the 2013 Varsity Cup, against the Maties in Stellenbosch and a home match against NWU Pukke.

=== Senior career ===
==== Golden Lions / Lions ====
His senior debut came for the Golden Lions in the 2012 Vodacom Cup competition, coming on as a second-half substitute in the Golden Lions' 23–16 loss to the Leopards in Potchefstroom. Six more Vodacom Cup appearances followed in the same season.

De Wit played no first class rugby in 2013, but did score eight tries in 13 appearances during the 2013 Under-21 Provincial Championship competition, including a hat-trick against the Leopards U21 side and a brace against the Border U21 side.

He returned to first team action in 2014, being included in the squad for the 2014 Vodacom Cup competition. After one appearance against former side the Falcons, an injury to Warwick Tecklenburg led to De Wit's inclusion on the bench for their 2014 Super Rugby match against the Reds, with De Wit appearing in the 62nd minute for his Super Rugby debut.

De Wit was included in the Lions' squad for the 2015 Super Rugby season, but failed to make any appearances in the competition. However, he featured in all twelve of the Golden Lions' matches in the 2015 Currie Cup Premier Division, scoring two tries as he helped the Lions to win all ten of their matches during the regular season, their 44–33 win over the Free State Cheetahs in the semi-final and their 32–24 win over Western Province in the final to win the title for the eleventh time in their history.

=== Stormers / Western Province ===
At the start of 2017, De Wit moved to Cape Town, where he joined the Stormers Super Rugby team and the Western Province Currie Cup team. However, less than a week after being unveiled as a player, De Wit broke his ankle during a training session, ruling him out for an extended period of time. De Wit made his return, making his debut for the Stormers against the Sunwolves. He also carried on to represent the Western Province six times in the 2017 Currie Cup Premier Division. Western Province went on to win the 2017 Currie Cup Premier Division, which makes De Wit one of the few players who can claim to be a two-time winner of Premier Competition, the Currie Cup.

=== Southern Kings/ Eastern Province Elephants ===
At Southern Kings, de Wit played in the Guinness Pro 14 and represented the Southern Kings 9 times. He then moved to the Eastern Province Elephants in Port Elizabeth where he played 10 games.

=== Strela-Agro Rugby which is in Kazan, Russia ===
At the end of 2019, de Wit made the move abroad to Strela-Agro Rugby which is in Kazan, Russia coached by JP Nel. Strela has competed in the Russian Premier League, Russian Championship and the Russian Cup. de Wit represented Strela in 17 games scoring 6 tries in total. At the end of 2020 de Wit moved to club VVA Podmoskovye.

=== VVA Podmoskovye ===
De Wit made more than 30 appearances for VVA Podmoskovye and assisted them to a 3rd place in the Russian premiership for the first time since 2018 scoring a total of 55 points in one season. He represented VVA on the 7s circuit in the same year.

=== Penza Lokomotive ===
He made a move to Penza Lokomotive where he will be looking to represent them for 2022 season. De Wit made 43 appearances for Penza Lokomotive during the 2023 season . Scoring a total of seven tries and playing a major part in taking and ultimately winning the Russian National tournament . 2024 De Wit represented Penza Lokomotive in securing third place in the Russian National Tournament, was selected to represent the Barbarian team in playing against the Russian National team .
