= Ewald van der Westhuizen =

South African rugby union player (born 1990)

- Born: 3 April 1990 (age 36) Ladysmith, South Africa
- Height: 1.82 m (5 ft 11 1/2 in)
- Weight: 114 kg (17 st 13 lb; 251 lb)
- School: Hoërskool Voortrekker, Bethlehem
- University: University of Johannesburg

Rugby union career
- Position: Prop
- Current team: Griquas
Youth career
- 2008: Griffons
- 2010: Golden Lions
Amateur team(s)
Years	Team	Apps	(Points)
2012–2013	UJ	8	(0)
Senior career
Years	Team	Apps	(Points)
2013–2021	Griquas	77	(25)
2015	Cheetahs	5	(0)
2018–2019	→ Aurillac	4	(0)
2019–2020	Enisei-STM	5	(0)
- Correct as of 27 December 2021

Ewald 'Kop' van der Westhuizen (born 3 April 1990 in Ladysmith, South Africa) is a South African rugby union player for Griquas in the Currie Cup and in the Rugby Challenge. His regular position is prop.

== Career ==
=== Youth and Varsity Cup rugby ===
At secondary school level, he represented his local provincial side, the Griffons, at the Under-18 Craven Week tournament in 2008. The same year, he also played for the Griffons U19 side in the Under-19 Provincial Championship.

He moved to Johannesburg, where he represented the Golden Lions U21 side in the 2010 Under-21 Provincial Championship, making a solitary appearance. His big break came during the 2013 Varsity Cup competition; he was the first-choice tighthead prop for UJ, starting all eight their matches as they reached the semi-final of the competition.

=== Griquas ===
His performance in the Varsity Cup resulted in Kimberley-based side Griquas drafting him into their side when they had an injury crisis during the 2013 Currie Cup Premier Division season. His first class debut and only appearance for them during that competition came when he started their home match against the Blue Bulls.

He joined the side on a full-time basis in 2014. He played in all ten of their matches during the 2014 Vodacom Cup competition – starting nine of those – as the Griquas won the competition for the fifth time. He scored his first senior try in their Round Five match against former side Golden Lions and scored two tries in a four-minute spell in the second half to help Griquas secure a convincing 84–15 victory over the SWD Eagles in the Quarter Finals of the competition. He played all 80 minutes of the final, helping his side to a 30–6 victory over the Golden Lions.

He made four substitute appearances for Griquas during the 2014 Currie Cup qualification tournament, helping his side qualify for the 2014 Currie Cup Premier Division.
