= Burger Odendaal =

South African rugby union player

- Full name: Megiel Burger Odendaal
- Born: 15 April 1993 (age 33) Bloemfontein, South Africa
- Height: 1.87 m (6 ft 1 1/2 in)
- Weight: 95 kg (14 st 13 lb; 209 lb)
- School: Monument High School, Krugersdorp
- University: University of Pretoria

Rugby union career
- Position: Inside centre
- Current team: Kintetsu Liners
Youth career
- 2009–2011: Golden Lions
- 2012–2014: Blue Bulls
Amateur team(s)
Years	Team	Apps	(Points)
2013–2014	UP Tuks	2	(0)
Senior career
Years	Team	Apps	(Points)
2013–2020	Blue Bulls	50	(75)
2015–2020	Bulls	59	(35)
2017–2018	Blue Bulls XV	2	(0)
2018–2019	Kubota Spears	11	(10)
2020–2022	Lions	22	(15)
2020–2022	Golden Lions	12	(15)
2022	Wasps	4	(5)
2022-2023	Toshiba Brave Lupus	10	(15)
2023-2025	Northampton Saints	17	(5)
2025–	Kintetsu Liners	5	(0)
- Correct as of 31 May 2024

Megiel Burger Odendaal (born 15 April 1993) is a South African rugby union player. His regular position is inside centre.

== Career ==
=== Youth and Varsity Cup rugby ===
Odendaal played his high school rugby for Monument High School in Krugersdorp, which led to his inclusion in Golden Lions teams for youth week tournaments; he played for their Under-16 side at the 2009 Grant Khomo Week and for their Under-18 side at the 2011 Craven Week.

After the 2011 season, he then crossed the Jukskei River to join Pretoria-based side the Blue Bulls. He played for the Blue Bulls U19 side in the 2012 Under-19 Provincial Championship (scoring three tries in eight starts) and in the same year made the step up to Under-21 level, playing for the Blue Bulls U21 side in the 2012 Under-21 Provincial Championship. He also played at that level in the 2013 Under-21 Provincial Championship.

He also made solitary appearances for the UP Tuks in each of the 2013 and 2014 editions of the Varsity Cup.

=== South Africa ===
His first class debut came two days before his 20th birthday; he started for the Blue Bulls in their 2013 Vodacom Cup match against the Falcons in Springs, helping them to a 74–14 victory in his only appearance of the season.

He returned to the Blue Bulls side for their 2014 Vodacom Cup campaign. He made six appearances for them, all of them in the run-on side. He scored his first senior try in the third match of the season, a 49–10 win over the Griffons in Welkom. In his next match, he scored the first brace of his career, scoring two tries in the first 20 minutes of their match against the whipping boys of the competition, the Limpopo Blue Bulls, in a 114–0 win in Pretoria.

His first involvement at Currie Cup level came in 2014, when he was named in the Blue Bulls squad for the 2014 Currie Cup Premier Division season and he was named in the starting line-up for their opening match of the season against the Golden Lions.

It was announced on the 13th of July 2020 that Odendaal would be departing the Bulls and would be joining the Lions.

=== English Premiership ===
On the 22nd February 2022, it was announced that he had signed for Wasps Rugby on their official website ahead of the 2022/23 season. He was made redundant along with every other Wasps player and coach when the team entered administration on 17 October 2022.

On 10 January 2023, Odendaal was signed by Premiership rivals Northampton Saints following Wasps administration from the 2023-24 season.

=== Japan ===
On 22 July 2025, Odendaal would return to Japan to sign for Hanazono Kintetsu Liners in the Japan Rugby League One competition from the 2025-26 season.
