= Kefentse Mahlo =

South African rugby union player

- Full name: Kefentse Seshego Mahlo
- Born: 31 March 1993 (age 33) Ga-Sekororo, Tzaneen, South Africa
- Height: 1.75 m (5 ft 9 in)
- Weight: 80 kg (12 st 8 lb; 176 lb)
- School: Ben Vorster, Tzaneen
- University: UP Tuks

Rugby union career
- Position: Winger / Fullback / Scrum-half
Youth career
- 2006–2011: Limpopo Blue Bulls
- 2012–2014: Blue Bulls
Amateur team(s)
Years	Team	Apps	(Points)
2014	UP Tuks	7	(0)
Senior career
Years	Team	Apps	(Points)
2014–2018	Blue Bulls	15	(45)
2016–2017	Blue Bulls XV	17	(45)
2016–2017	Bulls	1	(0)
2021	Blue Bulls	1	(5)
2022-	Baia Mare	35	(90)
- Correct as of 18 December 2024

Kefentse Seshego Mahlo (born 31 March 1993) is a South African rugby union player for the Blue Bulls XV in the Rugby Challenge. His regular playing positions are winger, fullback or scrumhalf.

== Early life ==
Mahlo was born and raised in the village of Moshate Ga-Sekororo, Tzaneen. He had four siblings and played many sports in his childhood. Mahlo began playing rugby at age eight after being influenced by his older brother Kopano.

== Career ==
=== Youth / Varsity Cup rugby ===
At primary school level, Mahlo earned provincial colours in hockey and cricket, as well as representing the Limpopo Blue Bulls in the 2006 Under-13 Craven Week rugby union competition.

Mahlo again represented Limpopo at the Under-16 Grant Khomo Week competition in 2009 – which also earned him an inclusion in the Under-16 South African Elite squad – and played at South Africa's premier high school rugby competition, the Craven Week on two occasions; he played at fullback in the 2010 edition held in Welkom, scoring a try in their match against the SWD Eagles and also in the 2011 edition in Kimberley, where he started all three of their matches in the scrum-half position.

In 2011, Mahlo was awarded a contract by Limpopo's parent union, Pretoria-based side the Blue Bulls. After representing UP Tuks Young Guns in the 2012 Varsity Cup Young Guns competition, he represented the Blue Bulls U19s in the 2012 Under-19 Provincial Championship and scored five tries in twelve appearances; he scored just after half-time in his first match at Under-19 level to help his side to a 90–0 victory over SWD U19 and also scored in their matches against the Golden Lions U19, Western Province U19, Leopards U19 and Sharks U19. He played in the semi-final of the competition, which saw the Blue Bulls win 46–35 against the Sharks, but did not play in the final due to injury.

At the end of the season, Mahlo was invited to join a South African Under-20 training camp in preparation for the 2013 IRB Junior World Championship in France, but missed out on final selection.

In 2013, Mahlo once again represented the UP Tuks Young Guns, helping them to winning the 2013 Varsity Cup Young Guns competition, their second in a row. He also broke into the Blue Bulls U21 set-up, making ten appearances during the 2013 Under-21 Provincial Championship. He scored one try in their match against the Leopards U21 and once again helped his side progress to the final of the competition. He started the final but could not prevent his side losing 23–30 to Western Province U21.

Mahlo represented UP Tuks' first team in the 2014 Varsity Cup competition, playing in all seven of their matches as they finished in fifth spot to miss out on a semi-final spot. After making his first class debut during the 2014 Vodacom Cup, he returned to the Blue Bulls U21 side for the 2014 Under-21 Provincial Championship. He scored two tries in their first match of the season, a 143–0 win over Border U21 in Pretoria, and repeated his two-try haul against the same opposition later in the season, with the Blue Bulls running out 123–7 winners in East London. He also scored one try in each of their matches against the Sharks U21s to help them reach the final of the competition. He played the full 80 minutes of the final, with the Blue Bulls beating Western Province U21 20–10 to avenge the 2013 final defeat.

=== Blue Bulls ===
Mahlo made his first class debut for the Blue Bulls during the 2014 Vodacom Cup competition, coming on as a second-half replacement in their match against the Griffons in Welkom and helping the side to a 49–0 victory. He scored his first senior try in their next match, getting one of eighteen tries in their 116–0 demolition of Mahlo's former side, the Limpopo Blue Bulls. He made a third substitute appearance in their 15–16 loss to the Golden Lions in the semi-final of the competition.

Mahlo returned to the Vodacom Cup side for their 2015 campaign. After appearances off the bench against the Falcons and the Leopards in their opening two matches of the season, he also came on as a replacement in their match against trans-Jukskei rivals the Golden Lions and scored both tries for the Blue Bulls in a 12–24 defeat. He was elevated to the starting line-up for the first time for their next match, a 20–18 win over Nelspruit-based side the Pumas. Mahlo made a total of three starts and six appearances off the bench in the Blue Bulls' 2015 Vodacom Cup campaign, helping them all the way to the semi-final of the competition, where they lost 6–10 to Western Province. Mahlo ended the season with six tries to his name, the top try scorer for the Blue Bulls, and he received the Vodacom Cup Players' Player of the Year award at the Blue Bulls' end-of-years awards ceremony in December 2015.
