= Gouws Prinsloo =

South African rugby union footballer

- Full name: Johannes Gouws Prinsloo
- Born: 19 July 1990 (age 36) East London, South Africa
- Height: 1.80 m (5 ft 11 in)
- Weight: 88 kg (13 st 12 lb; 194 lb)
- School: Marlow Agricultural, Cradock

Rugby union career
- Position: Fly-Half / Fullback
- Current team: Bobigny
Youth career
- 2008: Eastern Province Country Districts
- 2009–2011: Sharks
Amateur team(s)
Years	Team	Apps	(Points)
2014	UFS Shimlas	7	(54)
Senior career
Years	Team	Apps	(Points)
2011–2013	Sharks XV	21	(181)
2011–2012	Sharks (Currie Cup)	4	(0)
2013–2016	Griquas	51	(377)
2014	Cheetahs	1	(0)
2016–present	Bobigny	0	(0)
- Correct as of 22 July 2016

Johannes Gouws Prinsloo (born 19 July 1990 in East London, South Africa) is a South African rugby union footballer. His regular playing position is fullback.

== Career ==
He represented the Sharks in the Currie Cup and Vodacom Cup competitions between 2011 and 2013.

In 2013, he joined Griquas prior to the 2013 Currie Cup Premier Division season. In July 2014, he extended his contract until the end of 2015.

In 2016, he joined French Fédérale 1 side Bobigny.
