= Tienie Burger =

South African rugby union player

- Full name: Martinus Abraham Burger
- Born: 1 November 1993 (age 33) Rosendal, South Africa
- Height: 1.93 m (6 ft 4 in)
- Weight: 104 kg (229 lb; 16 st 5 lb)
- School: Grey College, Bloemfontein
- Occupation: Rugby Union Player

Rugby union career
- Position: Flanker / Lock
- Current team: Southern Kings
Youth career
- 2006: Griffons
- 2011–2014: Free State Cheetahs
Amateur team(s)
| Years | Team | Apps | (Points) |
| 2014–2015 | UFS Shimlas | 8 | (0) |
Senior career
| Years | Team | Apps | (Points) |
| 2014–2017 | Free State XV | 16 | (15) |
| 2014–2016 | Free State Cheetahs | 16 | (10) |
| 2015 | Cheetahs | 11 | (0) |
| 2017–present | Southern Kings | 30 | (10) |
- Correct as of 4 May 2019
International career
| Years | Team | Apps | (Points) |
| 2011 | S.A. Academy | | |
- Correct as of 22 April 2018

Martinus Abraham Burger (born 1 November 1993) is a South African rugby union player for the Southern Kings in the Pro14. His regular position is lock or flanker.

== Career ==
=== Youth and Varsity Cup rugby ===
At the primary school level, he was selected for the Griffons side that played at the Under-13 Craven Week competition in 2006.

Burger then went to Grey College in Bloemfontein, which is in Free State Cheetahs territory. He represented them at the Under-18 Academy Week in 2011 and also played for the Free State U19 side in the 2011 Under-19 Provincial Championship. In 2012, he started off playing for the U19s in the 2012 Under-19 Provincial Championship, but halfway through the season, he was promoted to the Free State U21 side and started six matches for them in the 2012 Under-21 Provincial Championship.

Burger once again played for them in the 2013 Under-21 Provincial Championship, scoring five tries in seven starts, including a brace in their match against Border U21.

Burger started the 2014 season playing Varsity Cup rugby for the UFS Shimlas, starting all seven of their matches as they finished fifth in the competition, before returning to Under-21 action in the 2014 Under-21 Provincial Championship.

=== Free State Cheetahs ===
Burger made his first class debut during the 2014 Vodacom Cup competition. He was selected in the run-on side for the Free State XV for their match against Kenyan invitational side Simba XV and scored his first senior try in the opening minute of the match as they ran out 75–10 winners. He also started their final match in the competition against the Blue Bulls a week later as they lost 21–22 in Bloemfontein.

Burger was then named in the starting line-up for the Free State Cheetahs for their opening match of the 2014 Currie Cup Premier Division season against the Pumas in Bloemfontein.
