= Carel Greeff =

South African rugby union player

- Full name: Carel Frederik Kirstein Greeff
- Born: 20 May 1990 (age 36) Klerksdorp, South Africa
- Height: 1.83 m (6 ft 0 in)
- Weight: 105 kg (16 st 7 lb; 231 lb)
- School: Schoonspruit High School
- University: BCom Financial Management / Post Graduate Certificate in Education at Exeed College United Arab Emirates

Rugby union career
- Position: Flanker / Number Eight
- Current team: Rugby Rovigo Delta
Youth career
- 2006–2008: Leopards
- 2009: Sharks
- 2011: Golden Lions
Amateur team(s)
| Years | Team | Apps | (Points) |
| 2013 | Wits | 7 | (25) |
Senior career
| Years | Team | Apps | (Points) |
| 2011 | Golden Lions XV | 1 | (0) |
| 2013–2015 | Griquas | 50 | (160) |
| 2014–2015 | Cheetahs | 6 | (10) |
| 2016–2017 | Pumas | 31 | (45) |
| 2017–2020 | I Medicei | 52 | (75) |
| 2020-2022 | Rovigo Delta | 18 | (40) |
- Correct as of 7 September 2019
International career
| Years | Team | Apps | (Points) |
| 2008 | S.A. Elite Squad | | |

Carel Frederick Kirstein Greeff (born 20 May 1990) is a South African former rugby union player. His last team was Italian Top12 side Rugby Rovigo Delta. His regular position was loose-forward.

== Career ==
=== Youth ===
He represented the Leopards at the 2006 Under-16 Grant Khomo Week, 2007 Under-18 Academy Week and 2008 Under-18 Craven Week competitions. His performances in the latter also resulted in his inclusion in an Under-18 South African Elite squad in 2008.

The then joined the Sharks and was included in their U19 squad for the 2009 Under-19 Provincial Championship competition.

=== MTN Golden Lions ===
In 2011, he made his first class debut for the Golden Lions in a compulsory friendly match prior to the 2011 Currie Cup Premier Division season, starting the match against the Falcons. He never appeared in the competition proper, instead representing the Golden Lions U21 team in the 2011 Under-21 Provincial Championship competition, making twelve appearances.

=== Varsity Cup Rugby ===
He played in the 2013 Varsity Cup competition for Wits, scoring five tries in seven appearances, making him the joint top try scorer in the competition.

=== GWK Griquas ===
He then joined Griquas before the 2013 Currie Cup Premier Division. He made his debut for them in the opening match of the season, coming on as a half-time in their match against the Sharks in Durban. He scored a try in injury time to tie the score 30–30 and a Nico Scheepers conversion gave Griquas a dramatic victory.

=== Toyota Free State Cheetahs ===
In 2014, Greeff was included in the Cheetahs squad for the 2014 Super Rugby season. He was named on the bench for their matches against the Force and the Brumbies, but didn't get playing time.

However, on 24 May 2014, he made his Super Rugby debut against the Stormers in Cape Town, coming on as a reserve flank.

=== Steval Pumas ===
Greeff signed a two-year contract with Port Elizabeth-based Super Rugby side the Eastern Province Kings prior to the 2016 season. However, after the side failed to pay players' salaries, allowing all players to join other teams, Greeff moved to Nelspruit to join the Pumas on a two-year deal instead.

=== Toscana Aeroporti I Medicei ===
Greeff moved to Italy to join National Championship of Excellence side I Medicei in 2017.

He played a total of 52 games and scored 75 points for I Medicei in 3 full seasons.

=== Rugby Rovigo Delta ===
In 2020, Greeff signed a two-year contract with the Top12 side to officially join Rugby Rovigo Delta. In 2021 Carel Greeff scored the final tries in the Semi-Final and Final to secure a dramatic 13th Italian National Championship for Rugby Rovigo Delta. At the end of the 2022 rugby Season Carel retired from professional rugby

== Retirement ==
After his retirement in 2022, he moved to Abu Dhabi with his wife Aloise Greeff, who is a primary school teacher and his son Benjamin. After obtaining his degree in finance and management from the University of South Africa he began working as a manager of a local goods store. He changed positions in 2023 where he began to work as a General Manager of Al Ain Amblers rugby club. As of 2023 he is also expecting his second child with wife Aloise Greeff.

In 2025, Carel and Aloise parted ways and filed for divorce with joint custody. Carel is studying an MBA and is currently appointed as the Al Ain Amblers Rugby Club Head coach while being the General Manager during the day.
