= Lohan Jacobs =

South African rugby union player

- Full name: Willem Johannes Jacobs
- Born: 23 April 1991 (age 35) Krugersdorp
- Height: 1.76 m (5 ft 9 1/2 in)
- Weight: 88 kg (13 st 12 lb; 194 lb)
- School: Afrikaanse Hoër Seunskool
- University: Unisa

Rugby union career
- Position: Scrum-half
Youth career
- 2004–2012: Blue Bulls
Amateur team(s)
| Years | Team | Apps | (Points) |
| 2012–2013 | UP Tuks | 11 | (15) |
Senior career
| Years | Team | Apps | (Points) |
| 2011–2014 | Blue Bulls | 23 | (10) |
| 2015 | Golden Lions | 10 | (8) |
| 2015 | Lions | 1 | (0) |
- Correct as of 2 November 2015
International career
| Years | Team | Apps | (Points) |
| 2009 | SA U18 High Performance | | |
| 2010–2011 | South Africa U20 | 6 | (0) |
- Correct as of 22 May 2015

Willem Johannes 'Lohan' Jacobs is a South African rugby union player, who most recently played with the Golden Lions. His usual position is scrum-half.

== Career ==
At youth level, he represented Blue Bulls at various levels, all the way from U13 Craven Week level in 2004 to U21 Currie Cup level in 2012.

He made his debut for the first team as a last-minute substitute in the Blue Bulls' 35–7 defeat to Western Province in the 2011 Currie Cup Premier Division. He got his first start in Blue Bulls colours in the Vodacom Cup game against Griquas in 2012.

He moved to Johannesburg for the 2015 to join the Golden Lions.

He also played for UP Tuks in the 2012 Varsity Cup, scoring three tries in eight appearances for the eventual champions.

He played for the South Africa U20 team at the 2010 IRB Junior World Championship in Argentina.
