= Jaco van Tonder =

South African rugby union player

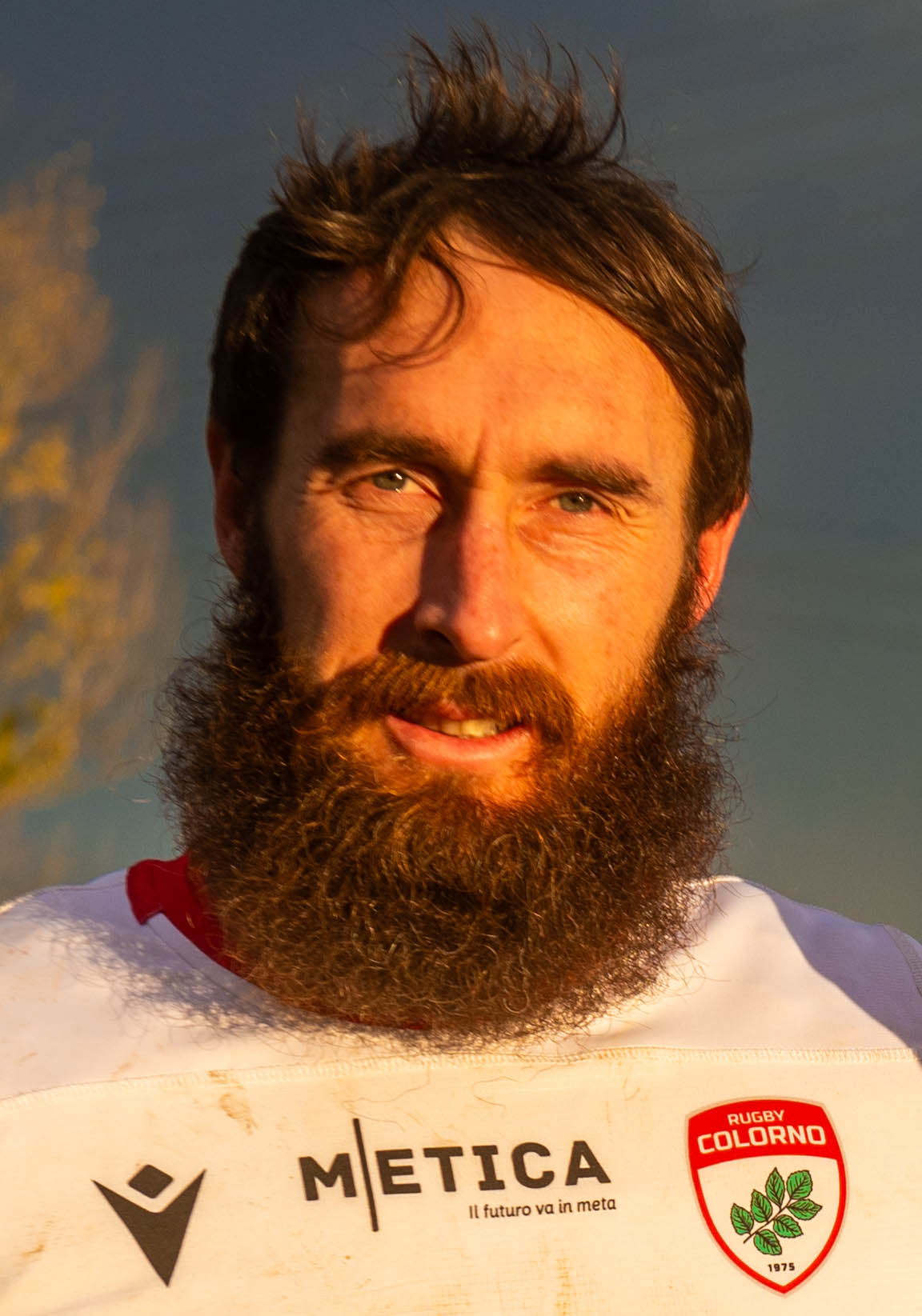
- Born: 7 April 1991 (age 35) Cape Town, South Africa
- Height: 1.86 m (6 ft 1 in)
- Weight: 95 kg (209 lb; 14 st 13 lb)
- School: Outeniqua High School, George

Rugby union career
- Position: Full-back / Winger
- Current team: Colorno
Youth career
- 2007–2009: SWD Eagles
- 2010–2012: Sharks
Senior career
Years	Team	Apps	(Points)
2012–2015	Sharks XV	14	(28)
2013–2014	Sharks (Currie Cup)	7	(0)
2013–2014	Sharks	3	(0)
2016	Southern Kings	5	(0)
2016	Eastern Province Kings	2	(0)
2016–2019	Valpolicella		
2019–2024	Colorno	84	(169)
- Correct as of 22 July 2016

Jaco van Tonder (born 7 April 1991) is a South African rugby union player, currently playing with Top10 side Valpolicella. His regular position is full-back, winger or fly-half.

== Career ==
=== Youth ===
He represented George-based side SWD Eagles at the 2007 Under-16 Grant Khomo Week, as well as at the 2008 and 2009 Under-18 Craven Week tournaments. He was also included in an Under-18 Elite Squad in 2008.

He joined the Sharks academy in 2010 and made 40 appearances for their Under-19 and Under-21 teams between 2010 and 2012.

=== Sharks ===
He was included in the Sharks XV squad for the 2011 Vodacom Cup competition, but failed to make an appearance. He did make his first class debut in the 2012 Vodacom Cup, making a solitary substitute appearance in their match against the Boland Cavaliers in Malmesbury. He was once again included in their squad for the 2013 Vodacom Cup and made six appearances this time, including making his first senior start against the SWD Eagles and scoring his first try against Boland Cavaliers a week later.

=== Sharks ===
In 2013, he was named in the Sharks squad for their Super Rugby match against the Blues, but failed to make an appearance from the bench. He was released by the Sharks in November 2015.
