= Danie Dames =

Namibia international rugby union player (born 1986)

- Full name: Hendrik Daniel Petrus Dames
- Born: 7 February 1986 (age 40) Koës, South West Africa
- Height: 1.90 m (6 ft 3 in)
- Weight: 97 kg (15 st 4 lb; 214 lb)
- School: Hoërskool Duineveld, Upington
- University: North-West University, Potchefstroom

Rugby union career
- Position: Winger / Fullback
Youth career
- 2004: Griquas
- 2005–2006: Leopards
- 2007: Sharks
Amateur team(s)
Years	Team	Apps	(Points)
2010	NWU Pukke	1	(0)
Senior career
Years	Team	Apps	(Points)
2008–2009	Sharks (Currie Cup)	12	(0)
2009–2013	Leopards	65	(135)
2014–2015	Griquas	20	(20)
2015	Cheetahs	1	(0)
- Correct as of 12 October 2015
International career
Years	Team	Apps	(Points)
2005	Namibia Under-19		
2011–present	Namibia	11	(15)
- Correct as of 26 March 2015

Hendrik Daniel Petrus Dames (born 7 February 1986, in Koës) is a Namibian international rugby union player, who most recently played with Griquas. He can play as a winger or a full-back.

== Career ==
=== Youth ===
Dames represented the Griquas side at the 2004 Craven Week tournament in Nelspruit. The following year, Dames was a member of the Namibia Under-19 squad that participated in the 2005 Under 19 Rugby World Championship in Durban.

He then moved to Potchefstroom, where he played for the Leopards U19 side in 2005 and for the Leopards U21 side in 2006, before joining Durban-based side the Sharks, where he played for the Sharks U21 side in 2007.

=== Sharks ===
He made his senior bow in 2008, playing for the Sharks' Vodacom Cup side, the Natal Wildebeest in the 2008 Vodacom Cup competition, his debut coming in their match against the Pumas in Durban. He made eight appearances in the competition, one in a Currie Cup pre-season compulsory friendly match against the Griffons and a further four for the Sharks XV in the 2009 Vodacom Cup, but failed to establish himself in the Currie Cup side.

=== Leopards ===
He returned to the Leopards for the 2009 Currie Cup Premier Division. He remained in Potchefstroom for 5 years, scoring 27 tries in 65 appearances for the Leopards in the Currie Cup and Vodacom Cup competitions.

=== Griquas ===
At the end of 2013, Dames joined Kimberley-based side Griquas.

=== International ===
Dames was also a member of the Namibia squad for the 2011 Rugby World Cup in New Zealand, where he started 4 matches.
