= Jonathan Adendorf =

South African rugby union player

- Full name: Jonathan Wallis Adendorf
- Born: 23 August 1985 (age 41) Napier, South Africa
- Height: 1.95 m (6 ft 5 in)
- Weight: 110 kg (17 st 5 lb; 243 lb)
- School: Napier High School
- University: Stellenbosch University

Rugby union career
- Position: Flanker
- Current team: Griquas
Amateur team(s)
Years	Team	Apps	(Points)
2008–2010	Maties	24	(25)
Senior career
Years	Team	Apps	(Points)
2011	Pumas	5	(0)
2012–present	Griquas	83	(30)
- Correct as of 8 July 2018

Jonathan Wallis 'Kraai' Adendorf (born 23 August 1985) is a South African rugby union player for Griquas in the Currie Cup and in the Rugby Challenge. His regular playing position is flanker. Adendorf previously played for the Pumas. He has also played for Maties in the Varsity Cup.
