= Hencus van Wyk =

South African rugby union player

- Full name: Hendrik Jacobus van Wyk
- Born: 2 March 1992 (age 34) Nigel, South Africa
- Height: 1.83 m (6 ft 0 in)
- Weight: 119 kg (18 st 10 lb; 262 lb)
- School: Hoërskool Nylstroom
- University: UP Tuks

Rugby union career
- Position: Prop
- Current team: Cheetahs / Free State Cheetahs
Youth career
- 2008–2010: Limpopo Blue Bulls
- 2011–2012: Blue Bulls
Amateur team(s)
Years	Team	Apps	(Points)
2013	UP Tuks	4	(0)
Senior career
Years	Team	Apps	(Points)
2011–2016	Blue Bulls	21	(20)
2013–2016	Bulls	2	(0)
2015–2020	Munakata Sanix Blues	34	(10)
2016	Blue Bulls XV	1	(0)
2016	Golden Lions XV	1	(0)
2017	Lions	3	(0)
2018–2020	Sunwolves	16	(5)
2020	Cheetahs	1	(0)
2020–2021	NTT Red Hurricanes	1	(0)
2021	Free State Cheetahs	7	(0)
2022	San Diego Legion	13	(5)
2022–	Cheetahs		
2023–	Free State Cheetahs		
- Correct as of 25 September 2022

Hendrik Jacobus van Wyk (born 2 March 1992) is a South African rugby union player, currently playing with the Free State Cheetahs of the Currie Cup. His regular position is prop.

== Career ==
Van Wyk played at the 2008 Under–16 Grant Khomo Week and the Under–18 Craven Week for the Limpopo Blue Bulls before joining their parent club, the Blue Bulls. He played for them in the 2011 Under-19 Provincial Championship and 2012 Under-21 Provincial Championship competitions and was a regular starter throughout both competitions.

Van Wyk made his senior debut for the Blue Bulls in the 2011 Vodacom Cup against the Border Bulldogs. He didn't feature for the seniors again that season, or in 2012, but was included in the 2013 Vodacom Cup squad, where he made three starts before he was included on the Bulls squad for their 2013 Super Rugby season match against the Waratahs, coming on as a 53rd-minute substitute.

In 2013, Van Wyk signed a contract extension to keep him at the Blue Bulls until 2015. He joined Japanese Top Kyūshū League side Munakata Sanix Blues before the 2015–2016 season.

Van Wyk returned to the Bulls during the 2016 Super Rugby season, signing a contract until May 2016.
