= William Small-Smith =

South African rugby union player

- Full name: William Thomas Small-Smith
- Born: 31 March 1992 (age 34) Johannesburg
- Height: 1.84 m (6 ft 1/2 in)
- Weight: 90 kg (14 st 2 lb; 198 lb)
- School: Grey College, Bloemfontein
- University: University of Pretoria

Rugby union career
- Position: Centre
- Current team: Cheetahs / Free State Cheetahs
Youth career
- 2005: Golden Lions
- 2008–2010: Free State Cheetahs
- 2011–2013: Blue Bulls
Amateur team(s)
| Years | Team | Apps | (Points) |
| 2013 | UP Tuks | 5 | (0) |
Senior career
| Years | Team | Apps | (Points) |
| 2011–2015 | Blue Bulls | 24 | (55) |
| 2014–2015 | Bulls | 7 | (5) |
| 2016–2020 | Cheetahs | 65 | (78) |
| 2016–2021 | Free State Cheetahs | 25 | (64) |
- Correct as of 3 March 2021
International career
| Years | Team | Apps | (Points) |
| 2006 | Elite Squad | | |
| 2009 | S.A. Academy | | |
| 2009–2010 | S.A. Under-18 High Performance | | |
| 2011–2012 | South Africa Sevens | | |
| 2012 | South Africa Under-20 | 3 | (10) |
- Correct as of 22 April 2018

William Thomas Small-Smith (born 31 March 1992) is a former South African rugby union professional player for the Cheetahs in the Pro14 and the Free State Cheetahs in the Currie Cup. His regular position is centre.

== Career ==
=== Youth level ===
He represented the Golden Lions at the 2005 Under-13 Craven Week. He then attended Grey College in Bloemfontein, where he represented Free State Cheetahs at Under-16 and Under-18 levels between 2008 and 2010, during which time he was included in an Elite Squad, an S.A. Academy squad and a South Africa Schools High Performance squad.

=== Blue Bulls ===
He joined the Blue Bulls in 2011 and made his first class debut in the 2011 Vodacom Cup match against the Free State Cheetahs. He also made a further fourteen appearances for the Under-19 team that season.

=== Sevens and Junior World Championships ===
At the end of 2011, however, he linked up with the South Africa Sevens squad for three legs of the 2011–12 IRB Sevens World Series. He returned to represent the victorious South Africa Under-20 team in the 2012 IRB Junior World Championship.

=== Varsity Cup ===
Small-Smith also represented UP Tuks in the 2013, but picked up an injury prior to the final against Maties.

=== Cheetahs ===
He returned to Bloemfontein to join the Cheetahs for the 2016 Super Rugby season.

=== Pirates Touch Rugby ===
In 2022 he currently plays one touch rugby at Pirates rugby club in Johannesburg on Monday nights. Mainly partaking in Division 1 of the league but sometimes plays in Division 3. He is known to put in a dive on a hard field to make a touch.
