= Tian Meyer =

South African rugby union player

- Full name: Tian Carel Meyer
- Born: 20 September 1988 (age 38) Pietermaritzburg, South Africa
- Height: 1.77 m (5 ft 9 1/2 in)
- Weight: 85 kg (13 st 5 lb; 187 lb)
- School: Westville Boys' High School

Rugby union career
- Position: Scrum-Half / Centre
Youth career
- 2004–2009: Sharks
Amateur team(s)
Years	Team	Apps	(Points)
2013	College Rovers	6	(5)
Senior career
Years	Team	Apps	(Points)
2010–2011	Pumas	36	(50)
2012	Lions	11	(10)
2013	Sharks XV	4	(0)
2013	Golden Lions	6	(0)
2014–2015	Griquas	40	(60)
2014–2021	Cheetahs	90	(45)
2016–2021	Free State Cheetahs	32	(25)
2021	→ Sharks (loan)	2	(0)
2022	NTT Red Hurricanes	4	(0)
2022–2024	Urayasu D-Rocks	4	(14)
- Correct as of 12 January 2022

Tian Carel Meyer (born 20 September 1988) is a South African rugby union player for the Cheetahs in the Pro14 and the Free State Cheetahs in the Currie Cup. He plays mostly as a scrum-half and occasionally as a Wing.

He previously played for the Pumas, Sharks and Golden Lions domestically and for the Lions in Super Rugby.

He joined Griquas in 2014 on a two-year contract.

He signed a contract to join Bloemfontein-based side Free State Cheetahs prior to the 2016 season on a two-year contract.
