= Ruan Jacobs =

South African rugby union player

- Born: 30 June 1988 (age 38) Pretoria, South Africa
- Height: 1.84 m (6 ft 1/2 in)
- Weight: 90 kg (14 st 2 lb; 198 lb)
- School: Afrikaanse Hoër Seunskool
- University: University of the Free State / North West University
- Notable relative: Niell Jacobs (twin brother)

Rugby union career
- Position: Centre
- Current team: Border Bulldogs
Youth career
- 2006: Blue Bulls
- 2007–2009: Free State Cheetahs
Amateur team(s)
Years	Team	Apps	(Points)
2009	UFS Shimlas	3	(5)
2010–2012	NWU Pukke	14	(0)
Senior career
Years	Team	Apps	(Points)
2008–2009	Free State Cheetahs	7	(5)
2011	Leopards	1	(0)
2012–2014	Border Bulldogs	31	(20)
- Correct as of 26 September 2014

Ruan Jacobs (born 30 June 1988) is a South African rugby union player, currently playing with the Border Bulldogs. His regular position is centre. He is the twin brother of Niell Jacobs.

== Career ==
=== Youth ===
He represented the Blue Bulls at the 2006 Under–18 Academy Week before moving to Bloemfontein, where he represented the Free State Cheetahs in the Under-19 Provincial Championship competition in 2007 and the Under-21 Provincial Championship competition in 2008 and 2009. He also represented local university side, the UFS Shimlas in the 2008 Varsity Cup.

=== Senior career ===
He was included in the Free State Cheetahs squad for the 2008 and 2009 Vodacom Cup squads and made his senior debut for them in the 80–3 victory over the Griffons in April 2008.

After a further six appearances in the 2009 Vodacom Cup, he moved to Potchefstroom where he made a single appearance for the Leopards in the 2011 Vodacom Cup although he did represent the NWU Pukke in the 2010, 2011 and 2012 Varsity Cup tournaments.

In 2012, he – along with twin brother Niell – signed for East London-based side the Border Bulldogs.
