= Grant Hattingh =

South African rugby union player

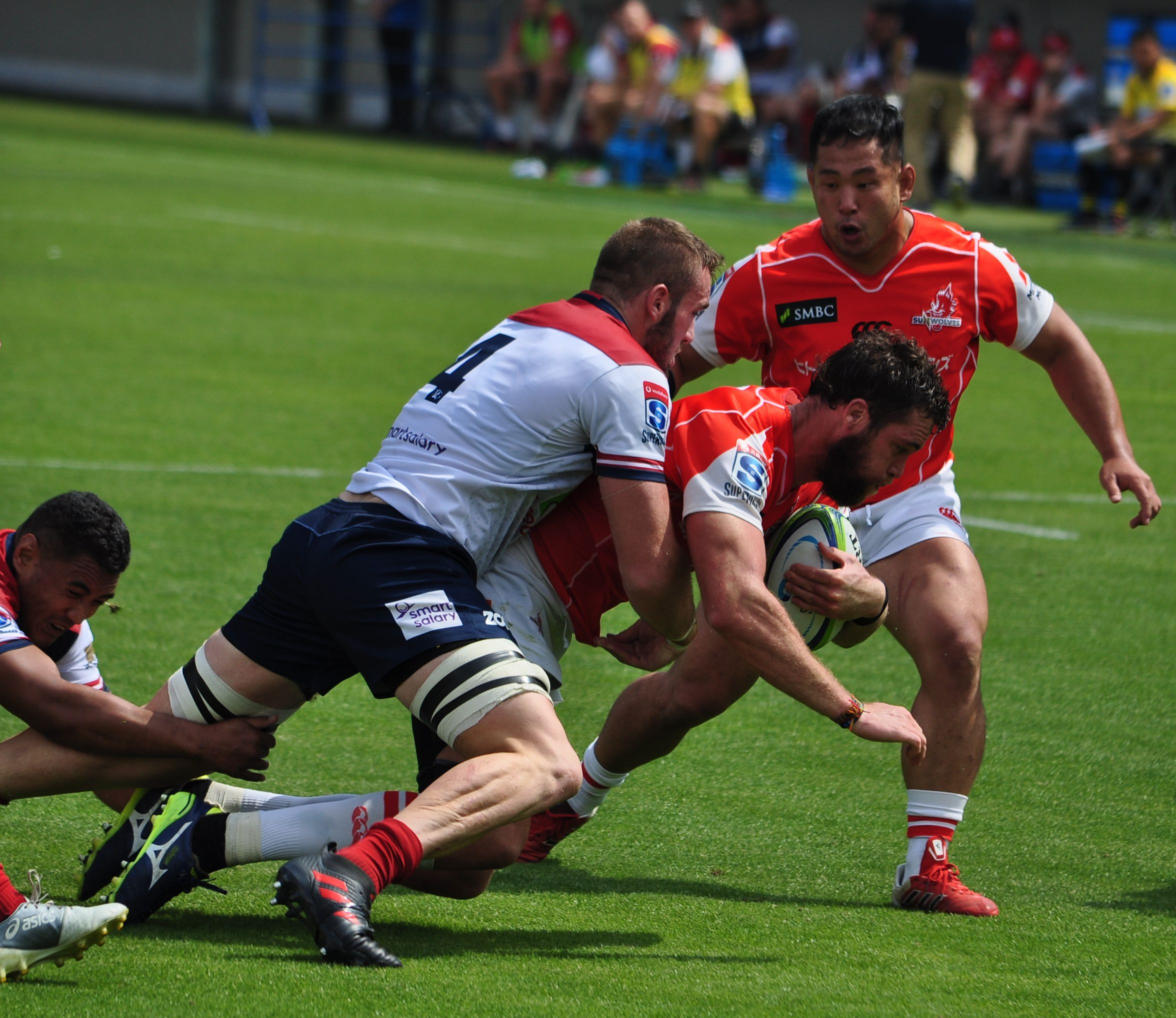
- Full name: Grant Neil Hattingh
- Born: 3 October 1990 (age 36) Johannesburg, South Africa
- Height: 2.01 m (6 ft 7 in)
- Weight: 117 kg (18 st 6 lb; 258 lb)
- School: Kingswood College

Rugby union career
- Position: Lock / Eighth Man
Youth career
- 2009–2011: Western Province
Amateur team(s)
Years	Team	Apps	(Points)
2011-12	Maties	13	(35)
Senior career
Years	Team	Apps	(Points)
2015–2018	Kubota Spears	31	(35)
2018–2021	Kobelco Steelers	9	(25)
- Correct as of 21 February 2021
Provincial / State sides
Years	Team	Apps	(Points)
2011–2012	Western Province	1	(0)
2012–2015	Blue Bulls	29	(10)
Super Rugby
Years	Team	Apps	(Points)
2012	Lions	9	(5)
2013–2016	Bulls	46	(10)
2018–2019	Sunwolves	17	(15)
- Correct as of 21 February 2021

Grant Neil Hattingh (born 3 October 1990 in Johannesburg, South Africa) is a rugby union player who plays as a lock, flanker or eighthman for Japanese sides the Sunwolves in Super Rugby and Kobelco Steelers in the Top League.

== Career ==
Hattingh played age-group level rugby for Western Province between 2009 and 2011 and also represented Maties in the 2011 and 2012 Varsity Cup competitions. He broke into the Western Province Vodacom Cup team after the completion of the 2012 Varsity Cup and made his provincial debut on 21 April 2012 against the Eagles in Oudtshoorn. Hattingh was a 35th minute replacement for Tyrone Holmes in a 29–14 win for Province.

In April 2012, Hattingh received a surprise call-up to the injury depleted Lions and he made his Super Rugby debut on 27 April 2012 as a 50th minute replacement for Hendrik Roodt as the Lions lost 34–20 to the Brumbies.

In July 2012, he announced that he was joining the Blue Bulls on a 2 1/2-year deal. At the end of 2013, he signed a contract extension to tie him to the Blue Bulls until October 2016.

=== Kubota Spears ===
In April 2015, Japanese Top League side Kubota Spears announced the signing of Hattingh for the 2015–16 Top League.
