= 2011 Varsity Cup =

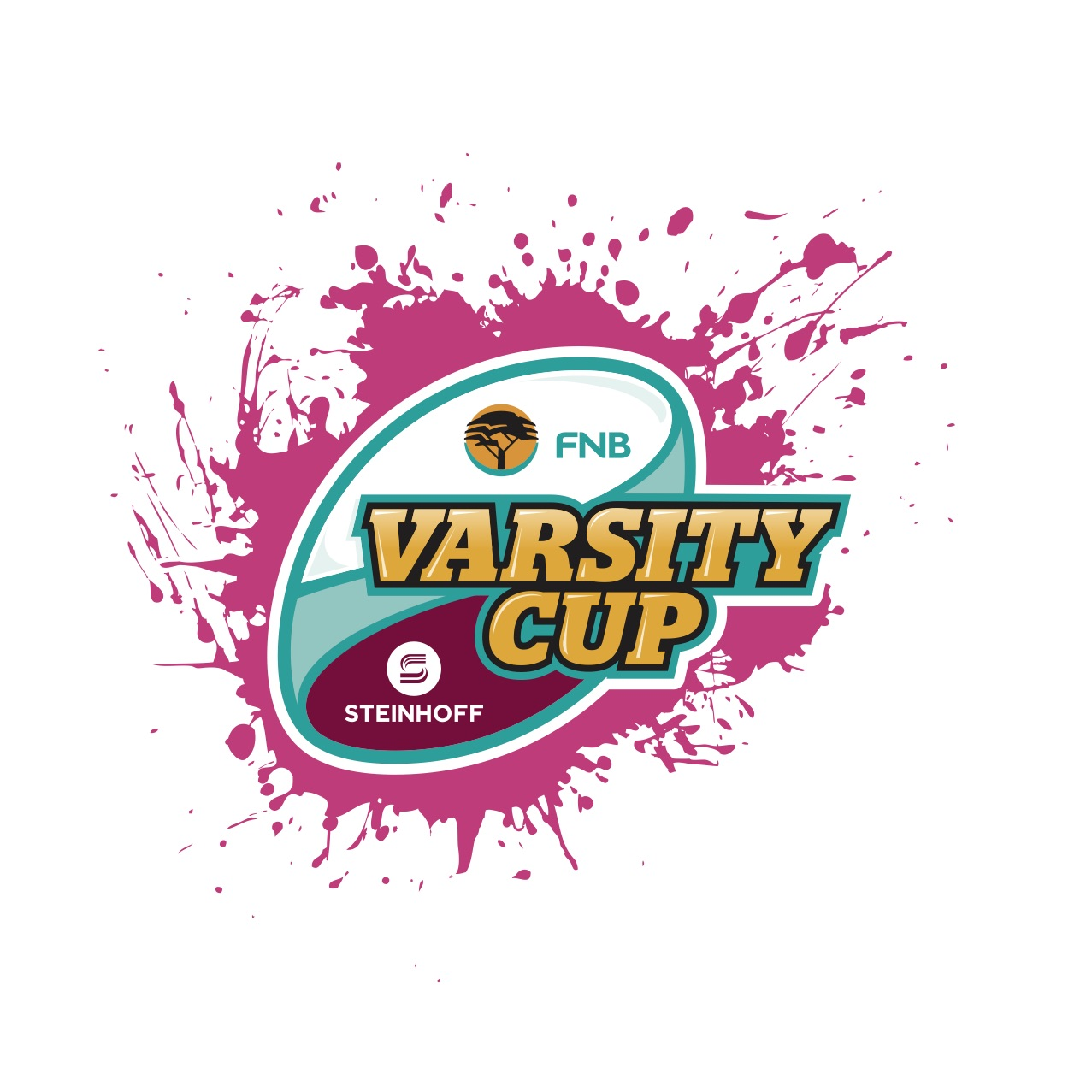
- Countries: South Africa
- Date: 7 February – 11 April 2011
- Champions: UCT Ikey Tigers (1st title)
- Runners-up: UP Tuks
- Relegated: None
- Matches played: 31
- Tries scored: 166 (average 5.4 per match)
- Top point scorer: Demetri Catrakilis (136)
- Top try scorer: Therlow Pietersen (7)

The 2011 Varsity Cup was contested from 7 February to 11 April 2011. The tournament (also known as the FNB Varsity Cup presented by Steinhoff International for sponsorship reasons) was the fourth season of the Varsity Cup, an annual inter-university rugby union competition featuring eight South African universities.

The tournament was won by UCT Ikey Tigers for the first time; they beat UP Tuks 26–16 in the final played on 11 April 2011. TUT Vikings won their relegation play-off match against CUT Ixias to remain in the Varsity Cup for 2012.

== Competition ==
=== Varsity Cup ===
There were eight participating universities in the 2011 Varsity Cup. These teams played each other once over the course of the season, either home or away.

Teams received four points for a win and two points for a draw. Bonus points were awarded to teams that scored 4 or more tries in a game, as well as to teams that lost a match by 7 points or less. Teams were ranked by points, then points difference (points scored less points conceded).

The top 4 teams qualified for the title play-offs. In the semi-finals, the team that finished first had home advantage against the team that finished fourth, while the team that finished second had home advantage against the team that finished third. The winners of these semi-finals played each other in the final, at the home venue of the higher-placed team.

=== Varsity Shield ===
There were five participating universities in the 2011 Varsity Shield. These teams played each other twice over the course of the season, once at home and once away.

Teams received four points for a win and two points for a draw. Bonus points were awarded to teams that scored 4 or more tries in a game, as well as to teams that lost a match by 7 points or less. Teams were ranked by points, then points difference (points scored less points conceded).

The top two teams qualified for the title play-offs. The team that finished first had home advantage against the team that finished second.

== Teams ==
Location of teams in the 2011 Varsity Cup

The following teams took part in the 2011 Varsity Cup competition:

2011 Varsity Cup teams
Team Name	University	Stadium
Maties	Stellenbosch University	Danie Craven Stadium, Stellenbosch
NMMU Madibaz	Nelson Mandela Metropolitan University	NMMU Stadium, Port Elizabeth
NWU Pukke	North-West University	Fanie du Toit Sport Ground, Potchefstroom
TUT Vikings	Tshwane University of Technology	TUT Stadium, Pretoria
UCT Ikey Tigers	University of Cape Town	UCT Rugby Fields, Cape Town
UFS Shimlas	University of the Free State	Shimla Park, Bloemfontein
UP Tuks	University of Pretoria	LC de Villiers Stadium, Pretoria
UJ	University of Johannesburg	UJ Stadium, Johannesburg

The following teams took part in the 2011 Varsity Shield competition:

2011 Varsity Shield teams
Team Name	University	Stadium
CUT Ixias	Central University of Technology	CUT Stadium, Bloemfontein
UFH Blues	University of Fort Hare	Davidson Rugby Field, Alice
UKZN Impi	University of KwaZulu-Natal	Peter Booysen Sports Park, Pietermaritzburg
UWC	University of the Western Cape	UWC Sport Stadium, Cape Town
Wits	University of the Witwatersrand	Wits Rugby Stadium, Johannesburg

== Varsity Cup ==
=== Table ===
2011 Varsity Cup Table
	Team	Played	Won	Drawn	Lost	Points For	Points Against	Points Difference	Tries For	Tries Against	Try Bonus	Losing Bonus	Points
1	UJ	7	6	0	1	198	158	+40	23	18	3	0	27
2	UCT Ikey Tigers	7	5	0	2	213	134	+79	22	16	3	0	23
3	UFS Shimlas	7	5	0	2	181	151	+30	23	16	2	1	23
4	UP Tuks	7	4	0	3	203	139	+64	26	15	4	2	22
5	Maties	7	4	0	3	209	138	+71	24	15	4	1	21
6	NWU Pukke	7	2	0	5	173	166	+7	25	19	3	1	12
7	NMMU Madibaz	7	1	0	6	112	245	-133	11	31	1	2	7
8	TUT Vikings	7	1	0	6	138	296	-158	15	39	2	0	6
The top 4 teams qualified for the semi-finals. The bottom team qualified for the promotion/relegation play-offs. Points breakdown: *4 points for a win *2 points for a draw *1 bonus point for a loss by seven points or less *1 bonus point for scoring four or more tries in a match

=== Fixtures and results ===
- Fixtures are subject to change.
- All times are South African (UTC+2).

==== Regular season ====
===== Round one =====
2011-02-07	UFS Shimlas	10 – 26	UCT Ikey Tigers	Xerox Shimla Park
17:00	Tries: Hanno Pieterse 73'c Con: George Whitehead (1/1); Pen: Franna du Toit 39' (1/1)	Report	Tries: Don Armand 18'c Sabelo Siyakatshana 69'c Con: Demetri Catrakilis (2/2); Pen: Demetri Catrakilis 47', 55', 61', 80' (4/4)	Attendance: 5,500; Referee: Tiaan Jonker

2011-02-07	Maties	32 – 6	NWU Pukke	Craven Stadium
19:00	Tries: Helmut Lehman 42'c Hugo Kloppers 53'c Os Hamman 66'c Tshotsho Mbovane 77'm Con: Donald Stevens (2/2); André Kemp (1/2); Pen: Donald Stevens 13', 23' (2/2)	Report	DG: Niëll Jacobs 17', 24' (2/2)	Attendance: 15,000; Referee: Rasta Rashivenga

2011-02-07	NMMU Madibaz	8 – 37	UP Tuks	Xerox NMMU Stadium
19:00	Tries: Theunis Dercksen 75'm Pen: Marius Muller 6' (1/5); Cards: Theunis Dercksen (yellow card) 30' to 41'	Report	Tries: Hayden Groepes 29'c Jono Ross 31'c Wesley Dunlop 55'm Jean du Plessis 71'm Jurgen Visser 78'c Con: Wesley Dunlop (2/3); Marnitz Boshoff (1/2); Pen: Wesley Dunlop 10', 36' (2/2)	Attendance: 3,400; Referee: Quinton Immelman

2011-02-07	TUT Vikings	23 – 33	UJ	TUT Stadium
19:00	Tries: Andisa Gqobo 39'c Vince Gwavu 42'c Con: Ruan Boshoff (2/2); Pen: Ruan Boshoff 10', 12', 57' (3/5); Cards: Wikus Botes (yellow card) 32' to 42'; Hansie Graaff (yellow card) 59' to 70'; Anton Krynauw (yellow card) 71' to 80'	Report	Tries: Harry Collins 47'm Justin Wheeler 64'm Earl Lewis 71'c Yssel Swanepoel 75'c Con: Theuns Kotzé (2/4); Pen: Theuns Kotzé 2', 32', 52' (3/4)	Referee: Archie Sehlako

===== Round two =====
2011-02-14	NMMU Madibaz	16 – 21	UJ	Xerox NMMU Stadium
17:00	Try: Wade Roos 29'c Con: Marius Muller (1/1); Pens: Marius Muller 52', 57', 63' (3/5)	Report	Tries: Wigan Pekeur 9'm Luan Steenkamp 45'c Con: Theuns Kotzé (1/2); Pens: Theuns Kotzé 8', 37', 61' (3/3)	Referee: François Groenewald

2011-02-14	NWU Pukke	8 – 36	UCT Ikey Tigers	Fanie du Toit Stadium
19:00	Try: Willem Barnard 4'm Pen: Johann Laker 2' (1/2)	Report	Tries: Tiger Bax 25'm Therlow Pietersen 30'c Nizaam Carr 36'c Paul Cohen 46'm Cons: Demetri Catrakilis (2/4); Pens: Demetri Catrakilis 59', 68', 74', 80' (4/5)	Attendance: 5,000; Referee: Ben Crouse

2011-02-14	UP Tuks	34 – 46	TUT Vikings	Tuks Rugby Stadium
19:00	Tries: Jurgen Visser 1'c Deon Helberg 7'm Marnitz Boshoff 16'c Warwick Tecklenburg 23'm Jono Ross 63'c Cons: Wesley Dunlop (2/4); Marnitz Boshoff (1/1); Pen: Wesley Dunlop 27' (1/1); Card: Jean du Plessis (red card) 33'	Report	Tries: Johan Pieterse 18'c, 60'c Vince Gwavu 35'c Wessel Cronjé 40'c Andisa Gqobo 48'm Hansie Graaff 75'c Cons: Ruan Boshoff (5/6); Pens: Ruan Boshoff 30', 45' (2/4)	Referee: Matt Kemp

2011-02-14	UFS Shimlas	21 – 15	Maties	Xerox Shimla Park
19:00	Tries: Charl Weideman 10'c Jamba Ulengo 64'm Con: Franna du Toit (1/1); Pens: Franna du Toit 24' (1/1); Shaun Davids 54', 76' (2/2)	Report	Pens: Donald Stevens 39', 45', 51', 63' (4/4); DG: André Kemp 26' (1/1)	Attendance: 9,000; Referee: Dilbert November

===== Round three =====
2011-02-21	TUT Vikings	12 – 44	Maties	TUT Stadium
17:00	Tries: JJ Breet 39'c Hansie Graaff 65'm Con: Ruan Boshoff (1/2); Card: Thom Seabala (yellow card) 52' to 64'	Report	Tries: Ryan Nell 29'm Tertius Daniller 34'c Donald Stevens 50'c Penalty try 52'c Tythan Adams 62'c, 71'm Cons: Donald Stevens (3/4); André Kemp (1/2); Pens: Donald Stevens 21', 44' (2/3)	Referee: Archie Sehlako

2011-02-21	UJ	28 – 24	UFS Shimlas	UJ Stadium
19:00	Tries: Lolo Waka 60'm Ruan Dreyer 66'c François du Toit 77'c Cons: Theuns Kotzé (2/3); Pens: Theuns Kotzé 15', 23' (2/2); DG: Theuns Kotzé 33' (1/1); Card: Danny Botha (yellow card) 37' to 48'	Report	Tries: Enrico Acker 19'c Cameron Jacobs 38'c Zandré de Bruin 45'c Cons: Shaun Davids (3/3); Pen: Shaun Davids 28'	Referee: Quinton Immelman

2011-02-21	NWU Pukke	10 – 35	UP Tuks	Fanie du Toit Stadium
19:00	Try: Cecil Dumond 57'c Con: Cecil Dumond (1/1); Pen: Johann Laker 14' (1/2)	Report	Tries: Danie Faasen 22'c, 52'm Arno Botha 27'c Hayden Groepes 40'm Jurgen Visser 75'm Cons: Wesley Dunlop (2/5); Pens: Wesley Dunlop 9', 20' (2/2)	Referee: Tiaan Jonker

2011-02-21	UCT Ikey Tigers	49 – 12	NMMU Madibaz	UCT Rugby Fields
19:00	Tries: Eben Etzebeth 24'm Ricky Rijs 40'c Francois van Wyk 45'm Nic Groom 49'c Therlow Pietersen 53'm Pallo Manuiel 62'm Cons: Demetri Catrakilis (2/6); Pens: Demetri Catrakilis 1', 7', 13', 15', 29' (5/7)	Report	Tries: Shannon Rick 19'm Ferdinand Gerber 79'c Con: Marius Muller (1/1); Card: Makholokoe Ramashala (yellow card) 50' to 59'	Referee: Rasta Rashivenga

===== Round four =====
2011-02-28	UCT Ikey Tigers	45 – 16	TUT Vikings	UCT Rugby Fields
17:00	Tries: Therlow Pietersen 37'c Ricky Rijs 39'c Francois van Wyk 57'm Brad Bosman 69'c Nick Holton 80'c Cons: Demetri Catrakilis (4/5); Pen: Demetri Catrakilis 2', 16', 19', 25' (4/5); Cards: Nizaam Carr (yellow card) 30' to 40'; Nizaam Carr (red card) 52'	Report	Try: Ruan Boshoff 34'c Con: Ruan Boshoff (1/1); Pens: Ruan Boshoff 42', 46', 68' (3/3); Cards: Emile Verster (yellow card) 56' to 66'	Referee: Mlungiseli Mdashe

2011-02-28	UFS Shimlas	20 – 15	UP Tuks	Xerox Shimla Park
19:00	Tries: Hanno Pieterse 25'c Charl Weideman 35'c Con: Shaun Davids (2/2); Pen: Shaun Davids 10', 23' (2/3)	Report	Tries: Wesley Dunlop 6'm Jurgen Visser 67'c Con: Wesley Dunlop (1/2); Pen: Wesley Dunlop 80' (1/1)	Attendance: 4,300; Referee: Matt Kemp

2011-02-28	UJ	20 – 16	NWU Pukke	UJ Stadium
19:00	Try: Aubrey McDonald 37'm Pens: Theuns Kotzé 16', 45', 61', 67', 71' (5/7)	Report	Tries: Willem Barnard 13'm Stompie de Wet 72'm Pens: Cecil Dumond 28' (1/2); Johann Laker 52' (1/1)	Attendance: 8,000; Referee: Ben Crouse

2011-02-28	Maties	49 – 17	NMMU Madibaz	Craven Stadium
19:00	Tries: Callie Visagie 2'm, 81'c Donald Stevens 6'c Ruan Combrinck 37'm Ryan Nell 46'c, 54'm Stokkies Hanekom 78'c Con: Donald Stevens (1/2); Ruan Combrinck (1/3); Jarryd Buys (2/2); Pens: Donald Stevens 21', 28' (2/2)	Report	Tries: Ferdinand Gerber 30'c Vuyolwethu Mazaka 76'c Con: Bradley Kretzmann (1/1); Marius Muller (1/1); Pen: Bradley Kretzmann 23' (1/3); Card: Ferdinand Gerber (yellow card) 52' to 62'	Referee: Dilbert November

===== Round Five =====
2011-03-07	UCT Ikey Tigers	16 – 37	Maties	UCT Rugby Fields
17:00	Try: Ricky Rijs 62'c Con: Demetri Catrakilis (1/1); Pens: Demetri Catrakilis 10', 11' (2/3); DG: Demetri Catrakilis 2' (1/1)	Report	Tries: Tythan Adams 4'c, 16'c Helmut Lehman 29'c Stokkies Hanekom 79'c Cons: Donald Stevens (2/2); André Kemp (2/2); Pens: Donald Stevens 6', 48', 68' (3/4)	Attendance: 5,036; Referee: Tiaan Jonker

2011-03-07	UFS Shimlas	37 – 28	NWU Pukke	Xerox Shimla Park
19:00	Tries: Jamba Ulengo 21'c, 72'c Wilken Heyns 54'm, 80'm Zandré de Bruin 61'c Cons: Shaun Davids (3/4); Pens: Shaun Davids 13', 38' (2/4)	Report	Tries: Ligtoring Landman 7'c Wouter Watermeyer 19'm JC Oberholzer 33'm Stompie de Wet 44'm Con: Cecil Dumond (1/4); Pens: Cecil Dumond 42', 66' (2/3); Card: Stompie de Wet (yellow card) 53' to 64'	Attendance: 7,500; Referee: Archie Sehlako

2011-03-07	UJ	23 – 38	UP Tuks	UJ Stadium
19:00	Tries: Aubrey McDonald 24'm Lolo Waka 49'm Cameron Peverett 80'c Con: Theuns Kotzé (1/3); Pens: Theuns Kotzé 6', 39' (2/3); Card: Yssel Swanepoel (yellow card) 60' to 70'	Report	Tries: Andries Coetzee 37'c Warwick Tecklenburg 45'c Jono Ross 65'c Arno Botha 72'm Cons: Wesley Dunlop (3/4); Pens: Wesley Dunlop 17', 42', 52', 62' (4/4); Card: Stairs Mhlongo (yellow card) 78'	Referee: Dilbert November

2011-03-07	NMMU Madibaz	40 – 15	TUT Vikings	Xerox NMMU Stadium
19:00	Tries: Martin Ferreira 59'c Juan du Preez 61'c Jeff Taljard 67'c Marius Muller 79'c Cons: Marius Muller (4/4); Pens: Marius Muller 8', 15', 24', 70' (4/6)	Report	Pens: Ruan Boshoff 5', 20', 29', 34', 44' (5/5)	Referee: Quinton Immelman

===== Round Six =====
2011-03-14	NWU Pukke	57 – 6	NMMU Madibaz	Fanie du Toit Stadium
17:00	Tries: Cecil Dumond 1'c Stompie de Wet 9'm Penalty try 15'c Ligtoring Landman 34'c, 54'c Schalk Oosthuizen 40'm, 49'c Tiaan Dorfling 43'c Snoepie Coetzee 70'm Cons: Cecil Dumond (6/9)	Report	Pens: Marius Muller 4', 7' (2/2)	Attendance: 2,000; Referee: Ben Crouse

2011-03-14	UP Tuks	27 – 13	Maties	Tuks Rugby Stadium
19:00	Tries: Deon Helberg 20'm Franco Mostert 65'c Con: JC Roos (1/1); Pens: Wesley Dunlop 7', 15', 29', 34', 41' (5/5); Cards: Nzubeko Zulu (yellow card) 24' to 36'; Jacques Verwey (yellow card) 25' to 36'	Report	Try: Penalty try 25'c Con: André Kemp (1/1); Pens: Donald Stevens 2', 55' (2/2)	Attendance: 5,000; Referee: Mlungiseli Mdashe

2011-03-14	TUT Vikings	26 – 52	UFS Shimlas	TUT Stadium
19:00	Tries: Ruan van Loo 23'm Ryno Lopes 61'c Tinus van Wyk 70'c Hansie Graaff 78'c Cons: Ruan Boshoff (3/4)	Report	Tries: Pieter Labuschagnè 5'c Jamba Ulengo 14'c, 17'm Jaco Colyn 35'c Enrico Acker 43'c JC van Wyk 49'c Willie Britz 58'm Earl Snyman 74'c Cons: George Whitehead (6/8)	Attendance: 1,000; Referee: Matt Kemp

2011-03-14	UCT Ikey Tigers	22 – 34	UJ	UCT Rugby Fields
19:00	Tries: Therlow Pietersen 7'c Mark Winter 69'c Paul Cohen 73'm Cons: Demetri Catrakilis (2/3); Pen: Demetri Catrakilis 10' (1/2)	Report	Tries: Justin Wheeler 18'c Theuns Kotzé 45'c Wendal Wehr 62'c Aubrey McDonald 64'c Cons: Theuns Kotzé (4/4); Pen: Theuns Kotzé 71' (1/2); DG: André Smith 75' (1/1)	Attendance: 1,000; Referee: François Groenewald

===== Round Seven =====
2011-03-21	UP Tuks	17 – 19	UCT Ikey Tigers	Tuks Rugby Stadium
17:00	Tries: Andries Coetzee 8'c Hayden Groepes 42'm Dabeon Draghoender 60'm Con: Wesley Dunlop (1/3)	Report	Try: Marcel Brache 67'c Con: Demetri Catrakilis (1/1); Pens: Demetri Catrakilis 4', 25', 45', 63' (4/6)	Attendance: 5,000; Referee: Rasta Rashivenga

2011-03-21	Maties	19 – 39	UJ	Craven Stadium
19:00	Tries: Stokkies Hanekom 39'c Hugo Kloppers 43'm Louis Jordaan 75'c Cons: Donald Stevens (2/3)	Report	Tries: Lolo Waka 4'm, 46'c Rudi Paige 24'm Luan Steenkamp 29'm Aubrey McDonald 73'c Alfred Ries 80'c Con: André Smith (3/3); DG: André Smith 55' (1/1)	Attendance: 5,000; Referee: Archie Sehlako

2011-03-21	NMMU Madibaz	13 – 17	UFS Shimlas	Xerox NMMU Stadium
19:00	Try: Marius Muller 49'c Con: Marius Muller (1/1); Pens: Marius Muller 34', 47' (2/3)	Report	Tries: Willie Britz 55'c Enrico Acker 65'c Cons: George Whitehead (2/2); Pen: George Whitehead 59' (1/1)	Attendance: 750; Referee: François Groenewald

2011-03-21	TUT Vikings	0 – 48	NWU Pukke	TUT Stadium
19:00		Report	Tries: Andrew van Wyk 7'c Schalk Oosthuizen 15'm Tiaan Dorfling 20'm, 33'c Alfred Skorbinski 28'c Ligtoring Landman 49'm Chris Schoonraad 57'm Joe Seerane 65'c Cons: Cecil Dumond (3/7); Schalk Oosthuizen (1/1)	Attendance: 1,000; Referee: Tiaan Jonker

==== Play-off games ====
Semi-finals
28 March 2011
UCT Ikey Tigers	57
UFS Shimlas	20
28 March 2011
UJ	11
UP Tuks	25

Final
11 April 2011
UP Tuks	16
UCT Ikey Tigers	26

===== Semi-finals =====
2011-03-28
16:45

UCT Ikey Tigers	57 – 20	UFS Shimlas
Tries: Therlow Pietersen 2'c, 30'c, 80'c Pete Haw 6'c, 23'c, 44'm Ricky Rijs 11'c Marcel Brache 21'c Cons: Demetri Catrakilis (7/8); Pen: Demetri Catrakilis 27' (1/2)	Report	Tries: Jamba Ulengo 54'm Charles Marais 66'c Cameron Jacobs 68'm Con: George Whitehead (1/3); Pens: George Whitehead 9' (1/1); Cards: Divandré Strydom (yellow card) 72'; Frederick Ngoza (yellow card) 73'

UCT Rugby Fields
Attendance: 6,000
Referee: Ben Crouse

2011-03-28
19:00

UJ	11 – 25	UP Tuks
Try: Johan Snyman 48'm Pen: Theuns Kotzé 22' (1/2); DG: Theuns Kotzé 5' (1/1)	Report	Try: Andries Coetzee 15'c, 54'm Wesley Dunlop 40'c Con: Wesley Dunlop (2/3); Pen: Wesley Dunlop 43', 78' (2/3)

UJ Stadium
Referee: Tiaan Jonker

===== Final =====
2011-04-11
19:00

UP Tuks	16 – 26	UCT Ikey Tigers
Try: Jean du Plessis 21'c Con: Wesley Dunlop (1/1); Pens: Wesley Dunlop 12', 17', 37' (3/3)	Report	Tries: Greg Mallett 1'c Matt Page 60'c Cons: Demetri Catrakilis (2/2); Pen: Demetri Catrakilis 40', 51', 55', 70' (4/4)

Tuks Rugby Stadium
Attendance: 25,000
Referee: Quinton Immelman

Tuks	UCT

FB	15	Andries Coetzee
RW	14	Deon Helberg
OC	13	Jean du Plessis
IC	12	Dabeon Draghoender
LW	11	Hayden Groepes
FH	10	Wesley Dunlop (c)
SH	9	Danie Faasen
N8	8	Arno Botha
OF	7	Jono Ross
BF	6	Warwick Tecklenburg
RL	5	Franco Mostert
LL	4	Nqubeko Zulu
TP	3	Stephan Pretorius
HK	2	Robbie Coetzee
LP	1	Vincent Koch
Replacements:
	16	Chris Crous
	17	Jean Roussouw
	18	Luvuyiso Lusaseni
	19	Jacques Verwey
	20	Clayton Stewart
	21	JC Roos
	22	Gerhardus Koetzee
	23	Grant Kemp
Coach:
Nollis Marais

FB	15	Therlow Pietersen
RW	14	Pete Haw
OC	13	Marcel Brache
IC	12	Tim Whitehead
LW	11	Ricky Rijs
FH	10	Demetri Catrakilis
SH	9	Nic Groom
N8	8	Greg Mallet
OF	7	Nick Fenton-Wells (c)
BF	6	Don Armand
RL	5	Levi Odendaal
LL	4	Eben Etzebeth
TP	3	Shane Meier
HK	2	Matt Page
LP	1	Wesley Chetty
Replacements:
	16	Neil Rautenbach
	17	Francois van Wyk
	18	Michael Morris
	19	Zandy Macdonald
	20	Ricky Schroeder
	21	Mark Winter
	22	Sabelo Siyakatshana
	23	Pete Olivier
Coach:
Kevin Foote

Player of the Match:
Demetri Catrakilis UCT Ikey Tigers

Assistant referees:
Rasta Rashivenga & Stefan Geldenhuys (South Africa), Jaco Kotze (South Africa)

Television match official:
Johann Meuwesen (South Africa)

=== Honours ===
2011 FNB
Varsity Cup Champions

UCT Ikey Tigers
1st title

Player That Rocks:
Callie Visagie (Maties)
Forward That Rocks:
Hugo Kloppers (Maties)
Back That Rocks:
Enrico Acker (UFS Shimlas)
Top Try Scorer:
Therlow Pietersen (UCT Ikey Tigers) [7]
Top Points Scorer:
Demetri Catrakilis (UCT Ikey Tigers) [136]

=== Top scorers ===
The following sections contain only points and tries which have been scored in competitive games in the 2011 FNB Varsity Cup.

==== Top points scorers ====
Rank	Player	Team	Points
1	Demetri Catrakilis	UCT Ikey Tigers	136
2	Wesley Dunlop	UP Tuks	103
3	Theuns Kotzé	UJ	82
4	Donald Stevens	Maties	75
5	Ruan Boshoff	TUT Vikings	68
6	Marius Muller	NMMU Madibaz	62
7	Cecil Dumond	NWU Pukke	41
8	Shaun Davids	UFS Shimlas	37
9	Therlow Pietersen	UCT Ikey Tigers	35
10	Jamba Ulengo	UFS Shimlas	30

Source: South African Rugby Union

==== Top try scorers ====
Rank	Player	Team	Points
1	Therlow Pietersen	UCT Ikey Tigers	7
2	Jamba Ulengo	UFS Shimlas	6
3	Tythan Adams	Maties	4
3	Andries Coetzee	UP Tuks	4
3	Ligtoring Landman	NWU Pukke	4
3	Aubrey McDonald	UJ	4
3	Ricky Rijs	UCT Ikey Tigers	3
3	Petrus Visser	UP Tuks	4
3	Lolo Waka	UJ	4
10	11 players		3

Source: South African Rugby Union

== Varsity Shield ==
=== Table ===
2011 Varsity Shield Table
	Team	Played	Won	Drawn	Lost	Points For	Points Against	Points Difference	Tries For	Tries Against	Try Bonus	Losing Bonus	Points
1	Wits	8	6	0	2	213	146	+67	27	13	2	1	27
2	CUT Ixias	8	5	0	3	256	218	+38	27	20	4	3	27
3	UWC	8	4	0	4	195	158	+37	21	15	0	3	19
4	UKZN Impi	8	3	0	5	148	234	-86	11	28	0	1	13
5	UFH Blues	8	2	0	6	137	193	-56	11	21	0	2	10
The top 2 teams will qualify for the final. The winner will qualify for the promotion/relegation play-offs. Points breakdown: *4 points for a win *2 points for a draw *1 bonus point for a loss by seven points or less *1 bonus point for scoring four or more tries in a match

=== Fixtures and results ===
- Fixtures are subject to change.
- All times are South African (UTC+2).

==== Regular season ====
===== Round one =====
2011-01-31	UFH Blues	14 – 23	Wits	Davidson Rugby Field
17:00	Tries: Lukhanyiso Magele; Pens: Ntando Kebe (3)	Report	Tries: Devin Montgomery; Sean Manton; Eman Mphande; Con: Michael Sephton-Poultney; Pen: Michael Sephton-Poultney (2)	Referee: Marius van der Westhuizen

2011-01-31	UWC	33 – 9	UKZN Impi	UWC Sport Stadium
17:00	Tries: Uzair Cassiem; Warrick Rhoda; Anthony Volmink; Con: Charl van Vollenhoven (3); Pen: Charl van Vollenhoven (4)	Report	Pens: Kirsten Jones (3)	Referee: Mlungiseli Mdashe

===== Round two =====
2011-02-03	Wits	22 – 19	UWC	Wits Rugby Stadium
19:00	Tries: Riaan Arends; Charles Baggott; Clayton Allem; Con: Michael Sephton-Poultney (2); Pen: Michael Sephton-Poultney	Report	Tries: Anthony Volmink; Rashaad Williams; Adrian Herman; Con: Justin McKay; Charl van Vollenhoven	Referee: Lusanda Jam

2011-02-03	CUT Ixias	31 – 12	UFH Blues	CUT Stadium
19:00	Tries: Inus Kritzinger (2); Leon Pretorius; Con: Jannie Myburgh (2); Pen: Jannie Myburgh (4)	Report	Pen: Qondani Katywa (4)	Referee: Gerrie de Bruin

===== Round three =====
2011-02-07	UWC	28 – 41	CUT Ixias	UWC Sport Stadium
19:00	Tries: Anthony Volmink; Adrian Herman; Warrick Rhoda; Con: Ambrose Steyn (2); Pen: Ambrose Steyn (3)	Report	Jaco Oosthuizen; Henku van Zyl; Rudi Britz; Deon Gouws; Gavin Annandale; Con: Jannie Myburgh (2); Con: Jannie Myburgh (4)	Referee: Mlungiseli Mdashe

2011-02-07	UKZN Impi	12 – 22	Wits	Peter Booysen Sports Park
19:00	Pen: Kirsten Jones (4)	Report	Tries: Nkuli Gamede (2); Riaan Arends; Con: Brandon Lizamore (2); Pen: Brandon Lizamore	Referee: Marius van der Westhuizen

===== Round four =====
2011-02-14	Wits	36 – 42	CUT Ixias	Wits Rugby Stadium
19:00	Tries: Brandon Lizamore; Katlego Kgama; Riaan Arends; Paulo Ferreira; Cons: Brandon Lizamore (2); Pens: Brandon Lizamore (4)	Report	Tries: Alec Mhlanga; Inus Kritzinger (2); Slang Sibanda; Francois Harvey; Cons: Jannie Myburgh (4); Pens: Jannie Myburgh (3)	Referee: Gerrie de Bruin

2011-02-14	UKZN Impi	22 – 16	UFH Blues	Peter Booysen Sports Park
19:00	Try: Lwazi Ngcungama; Con: Jaco Potgieter; Pens: Jaco Potgieter (5)	Report	Tries: Ayanda Mateisi; Vuyo Mbotho; Pens: Qondani Katywa (2)	Referee: Lusanda Jam

===== Round Five =====
2011-02-21	UFH Blues	18 – 17	UWC	Davidson Rugby Field
19:00	Tries: Thabo Ratyana; Vuyisani Mavuso; Con: Qondani Katywa; Pens: Qondani Katywa (2)	Report	Tries: Anthony Volmink; Donovan Williams; Charlie van Jaarsveld; Con: Charl van Vollenhoven	Referee: Mlungiseli Mdashe

2011-02-21	CUT Ixias	38 – 39	UKZN Impi	CUT Stadium
19:00	Tries: Jean Cook; Leon Pretorius; Slang Sibanda; Alec Mhlanga; Cons: Jannie Myburgh (3); Pens: Jannie Myburgh (4)	Report	Tries: Zander Engelbrecht; Kurt Schonert; Jaco Potgieter; Cons: Jaco Potgieter (3); Pens: Jaco Potgieter (6)	Referee: Marius van der Westhuizen

===== Round Six =====
2011-02-28	Wits	22 – 13	UFH Blues	Wits Rugby Stadium
19:00	Tries: Riaan Arends (2); Nkuli Gamede; Cons: Brandon Lizamore (2); Pen: Brandon Lizamore	Report	Try: Nkosi Nofuma; Con: Qondani Katywa; Pens: Qondani Katywa (2)	Referee: Lusanda Jam

2011-02-28	UKZN Impi	15 – 24	UWC	Peter Booysen Sports Park
19:00	Tries: Lean Stevens; Tinashe Bopoto; Con: Jaco Potgieter; Pen: Jaco Potgieter	Report	Tries: Charlie van Jaarsveld; Lwandile Makibi; Griffith Temba; Cons: Ambrose Steyn (3); Pen: Ambrose Steyn	Referee: Gerrie de Bruin

===== Round Seven =====
2011-03-07	UWC	19 – 11	Wits	UWC Sport Stadium
19:00	Try: JP Kellerman; Con: Ambrose Steyn; Pens: Ambrose Steyn (4)	Report	Try: Nkuli Gamede; Pens: Brandon Lizamore (2)	Referee: Gerrie de Bruin

2011-03-07	UFH Blues	24 – 30	CUT Ixias	Davidson Rugby Field
19:00	Tries: Billy Dutton; Vuyo Mbotho; Con: Qondani Katywa; Pen: Qondani Katywa (4)	Report	Tries: Gavin Annandale; Inus Kritzinger; Deon Gouws; Alec Mhlanga; Cons: Jannie Myburgh (2); Pens: Jannie Myburgh (2)	Referee: Marius van der Westhuizen

===== Round Eight =====
2011-03-14	CUT Ixias	30 – 29	UWC	CUT Stadium
19:00	Tries: Francois Harvey; Deon Gouws; Con: Jannie Myburgh; Pens: Jannie Myburgh (6)	Report	Tries: Adrian Herman; Anthony Volmink; Cons: Ambrose Steyn (2); Pens: Ambrose Steyn (5)	Referee: Lusanda Jam

2011-03-14	Wits	51 – 5	UKZN Impi	Wits Rugby Stadium
19:00	Tries: Jason Fraser (2); Nkuli Gamede (2); Riaan Arends; Sean Manton; KK Kgame; Cons: Brandon Lizamore (5); Pens: Brandon Lizamore (2)	Report	Try: Tinashe Bopoto	Referee: Marius van der Westhuizen

===== Round Nine =====
2011-03-21	CUT Ixias	22 – 26	Wits	CUT Stadium
19:00	Try: Maphelo Mpondo; Con: André le Roux; Pens: André le Roux (5)	Report	Tries: Rudolf Prinsloo; Brent Crossley; Riaan Arends; Con: Clayton Redford; Pens: Clayton Redford (2); Brandon Lizamore	Referee: Stephan Geldenhuys

2011-03-21	UFH Blues	28 – 22	UKZN Impi	Davidson Rugby Field
19:00	Tries: Itumeleng Mokae; Garth van Rayner (2); Cons: Qondisa Katywa (2); Pens: Saneliso Ngoma; Qondisa Katywa; DG: Qondisa Katywa	Report	Try: Jaco Potgieter; Con: Jaco Potgieter; Pen: Jaco Potgieter (5)	Referee: Pieter de Villiers

===== Round Ten =====
2011-03-28	UWC	26 – 12	UFH Blues	UWC Sport Stadium
19:00	Tries: Adrian Herman (2); Anthony Volmink; Con: Charl van Vollenhoven; Pens: Charl van Vollenhoven (3)	Report	Pens: Ayanda Mateisi (4)	Referee: Petri Bosch

2011-03-28	UKZN Impi	24 – 22	CUT Ixias	Peter Booysen Sports Park
19:00	Tries: Gerrit Fourie; Gareth Borchardt; Sizwe Kubheka; Cons: Jaco Potgieter (3); Pen: Jaco Potgieter	Report	Tries: Francois Harvey (2); Jaco Oosthuizen; Cons: André le Roux (2); Pen: André le Roux	Referee: Lusanda Jam

==== Play-off games ====
===== Final =====
2011-04-04	Wits	18 – 25	CUT Ixias	Wits Rugby Stadium
19:00	Tries: Charles Baggott; Riaan Arends; Con: Brandon Lizamore; Pen: Brandon Lizamore (2)	Report	Tries: Slang Sibanda (2); Jaco Oosthuizen; Cons: André le Roux (2); Pens: André le Roux (2)	Referee: Gerrie de Bruin

=== Honours ===
2011 FNB
Varsity Shield Champions

CUT Ixias
1st title

Player That Rocks:
Garth van Rayner (UFH Blues)
Forward That Rocks:
KK Kgame (Wits)
Back That Rocks:
Inus Kritzinger (CUT Ixias)
Top Try Scorer:
Riaan Arends (Wits) [8]
Top Points Scorer:
Jannie Myburgh (CUT Ixias) [97]

=== Top scorers ===
The following sections contain only points and tries which have been scored in competitive games in the 2011 FNB Varsity Shield.

==== Top points scorers ====
Rank	Player	Team	Points
1	Jannie Myburgh	CUT Ixias	97
2	Jaco Potgieter	UKZN Impi	82
3	Brandon Lizamore	Wits	68
4	Qondani Katywa	UFH Blues	58
5	Ambrose Steyn	UWC	55
6	Riaan Arends	Wits	40
7	André le Roux	CUT Ixias	34
8	Charl van Vollenhoven	UWC	33
9	Nkuli Gamede	UP Tuks	30
9	Anthony Volmink	UWC	30

Source: South African Rugby Union

==== Top try scorers ====
Rank	Player	Team	Points
1	Riaan Arends	Wits	8
2	Nkuli Gamede	UP Tuks	6
2	Anthony Volmink	UWC	6
4	Adrian Herman	UWC	5
4	Inus Kritzinger	CUT Ixias	5
6	Francois Harvey	CUT Ixias	4
6	Slang Sibanda	CUT Ixias	4
8	Deon Gouws	CUT Ixias	3
8	Alec Mhlanga	CUT Ixias	3
8	Jaco Oosthuizen	CUT Ixias	3

Source: South African Rugby Union

== Promotion/relegation play-offs ==
2011-04-11	TUT Vikings	50 – 43 (aet)	CUT Ixias	TUT Stadium
15:00	Tries: Ettienne Greeff; Lutho Nyeka; Ruan van Loo (3); Ryno Lopes; Abednego Mamushi; Gerrie van Niekerk; Cons: Justin van Staden; Hansie Graaff (3); Ruan van Loo	Report	Tries: Jean Cook (2); Slang Sibanda; Noël Marx; Frans Sisita; Cons: André le Roux (3); Pens: André le Roux (4)	Referee: Rasta Rashivenga

TUT Vikings remain in the Varsity Cup competition and CUT Ixias remain in the Varsity Shield competition.

== See also UJ team line up ==
- 2011 Currie Cup Premier Division
- 2011 Currie Cup First Division
- 2011 Vodacom Cup
