= Niell Jacobs =

South African rugby union player

- Born: 30 June 1988 (age 38) Pretoria, South Africa
- Height: 1.85 m (6 ft 1 in)
- Weight: 93 kg (14 st 9 lb; 205 lb)
- School: Afrikaanse Hoër Seunskool
- University: University of the Free State / North West University
- Notable relative: Ruan Jacobs (twin brother)

Rugby union career
- Position: Centre / Fly-half
- Current team: Border Bulldogs
Youth career
- 2006: Blue Bulls
- 2007–2009: Free State Cheetahs
Amateur team(s)
Years	Team	Apps	(Points)
2009	UFS Shimlas	7	(60)
2010–2011	NWU Pukke	8	(13)
Senior career
Years	Team	Apps	(Points)
2009–2011	Leopards	14	(30)
2012–2014	Border Bulldogs	35	(23)
- Correct as of 26 April 2014

Niell Jacobs (born 30 June 1988) is a South African rugby union player, currently playing with the Border Bulldogs. His regular position is centre or fly-half. He is the twin brother of Ruan Jacobs.

== Career ==
=== Youth ===
He represented the Blue Bulls at the 2006 Under–18 Academy Week before moving to Bloemfontein, where he represented the Free State Cheetahs in the Under-19 Provincial Championship competition in 2007 and the Under-21 Provincial Championship competition in 2007, 2008 and 2009. He also represented local university side, the UFS Shimlas in the 2009 Varsity Cup, scoring 60 points to put him fifth in the scoring charts.

=== Senior career ===
He never represented the Free State Cheetahs in senior rugby. Instead he moved to Potchefstroom, where he played for the Leopards, making his senior debut for them in the 2009 Currie Cup Premier Division in a match against the Sharks.

He made several appearances for them over the next two seasons and also represented NWU Pukke in the 2011 Varsity Cup.

However, he failed to establish himself in the first team and in 2012, he – along with twin brother Ruan – signed for East London-based side the Border Bulldogs.
