= 2012 Varsity Rugby =

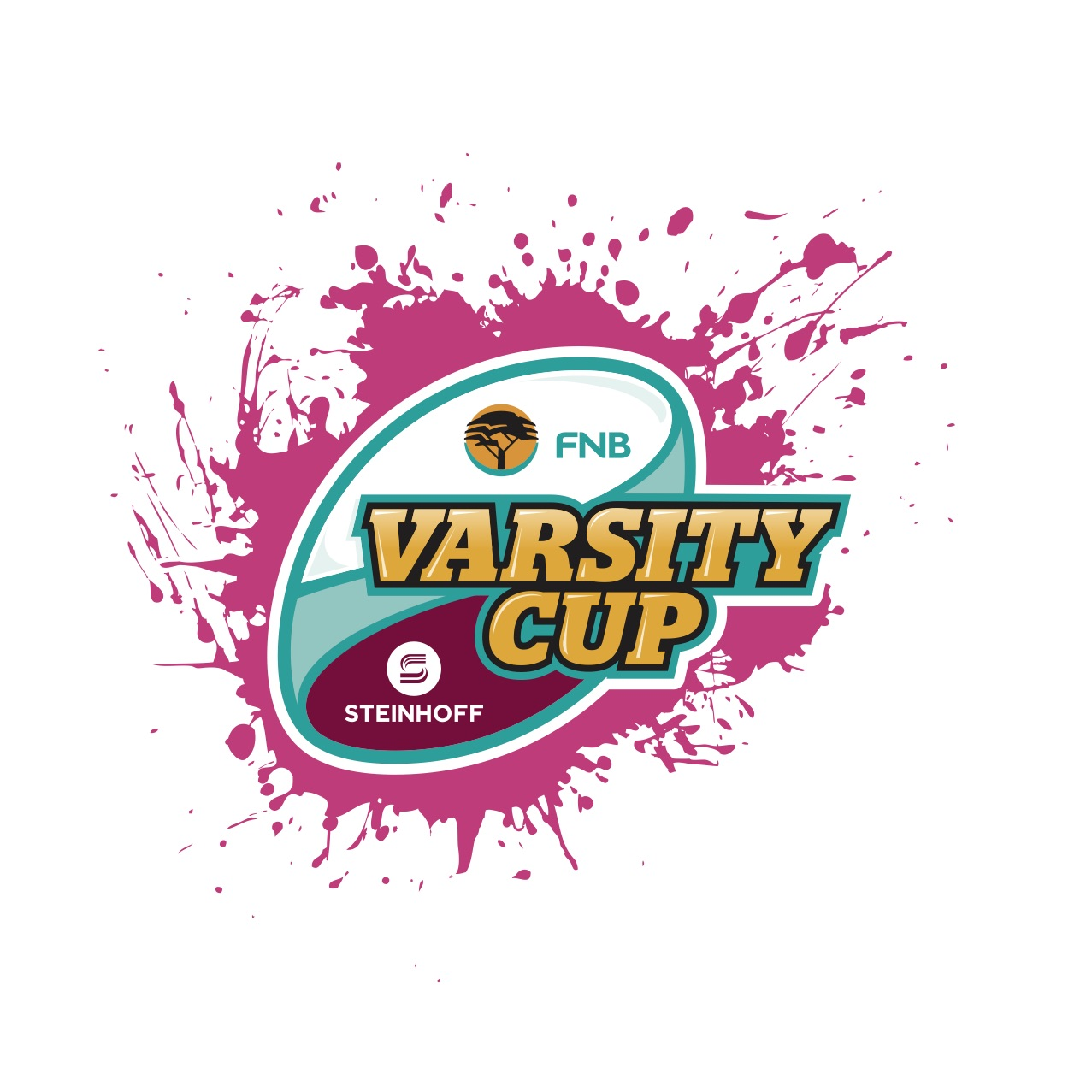
- Champions: UP Tuks
- Runners-up: Maties
- Top try scorer: Chysander Botha (9); Andrew van Wyk (9)

The 2012 Varsity Cup was contested from 6 February to 9 April 2012. The tournament (also known as the FNB Varsity Cup presented by Steinhoff International for sponsorship reasons) was the fifth season of the Varsity Cup, an annual inter-university rugby union competition featuring eight South African universities.

The tournament was won by UP Tuks for the first time; they beat Maties 29–21 in the final played on 9 April 2012. TUT Vikings were automatically relegated to the second-tier Varsity Shield competition for 2013, but UCT Ikey Tigers won their relegation play-off match against CUT Ixias to remain in the Varsity Cup for 2013.

== Scoring ==
All four 2012 Varsity Rugby competitions will use a different scoring system to the regular system. Tries will be worth five points as usual, but conversions will be worth three points, while penalties and drop goals will only be worth two points.

== Varsity Cup ==
2012 Varsity Cup
- Countries: South Africa
- Date: 6 February – 9 April 2012
- Champions: UP Tuks (1st title)
- Runners-up: Maties
- Relegated: TUT Vikings
- Matches played: 31
- Tries scored: 234 (average 7.5 per match)
- Top point scorer: Wesley Dunlop (83)
- Top try scorer: Chrysander Botha / Andrew van Wyk (9)

=== Competition Rules ===
There are eight participating universities in the 2012 Varsity Cup. These teams will play each other once over the course of the season, either home or away.

Teams receive four points for a win and two points for a draw. Bonus points are awarded to teams that score four or more tries in a game, as well as to teams that lose a match by seven points or less. Teams are ranked by log points, then points difference (points scored less points conceded).

The top four teams will qualify for the title play-offs. In the semi-finals, the team that finishes first will have home advantage against the team that finishes fourth, while the team that finishes second will have home advantage against the team that finishes third. The winners of these semi-finals will play each other in the final, at the home venue of the higher-placed team.

The team that finishes eighth in the Varsity Cup will be relegated to the 2013 Varsity Shield. The team that finishes seventh in the Varsity Cup will play a promotion/relegation match against the second-placed Varsity Shield team for a place in the 2013 Varsity Cup.

=== Teams ===
Location of teams in the 2012 Varsity Cup

The following teams took part in the 2012 Varsity Cup competition:

2012 Varsity Cup teams
Team Name	University	Stadium
Maties	Stellenbosch University	Danie Craven Stadium, Stellenbosch
NMMU Madibaz	Nelson Mandela Metropolitan University	NMMU Stadium, Port Elizabeth
NWU Pukke	North-West University	Fanie du Toit Sport Ground, Potchefstroom
TUT Vikings	Tshwane University of Technology	TUT Stadium, Pretoria
UCT Ikey Tigers	University of Cape Town	UCT Rugby Fields, Cape Town
UFS Shimlas	University of the Free State	Shimla Park, Bloemfontein
UP Tuks	University of Pretoria	LC de Villiers Stadium, Pretoria
UJ	University of Johannesburg	UJ Stadium, Johannesburg

=== Standings ===
2012 Varsity Cup Log
	Team	Played	Won	Drawn	Lost	Points For	Points Against	Points Difference	Tries For	Tries Against	Try Bonus	Losing Bonus	Points
1	UP Tuks	7	6	0	1	244	118	+126	31	16	5	1	30
2	Maties	7	6	1	0	206	84	+122	28	10	3	0	29
3	UJ	7	4	1	2	270	118	+152	35	15	5	1	24
4	NWU Pukke	7	4	1	2	237	163	+74	32	21	5	1	24
5	NMMU Madibaz	7	3	0	4	233	240	-7	33	33	4	0	16
6	UFS Shimlas	7	2	0	5	188	257	-69	22	34	2	1	11
7	UCT Ikey Tigers	7	1	1	5	164	195	-31	23	25	2	1	9
8	TUT Vikings	7	0	0	7	82	449	-367	10	60	2	0	2
The top 4 teams qualified for the semi-finals. The seventh-placed team played in the promotion/relegation play-offs. The bottom team was relegated. Points breakdown: *4 points for a win *2 points for a draw *1 bonus point for a loss by seven points or less *1 bonus point for scoring four or more tries in a match

=== Fixtures and results ===
- Fixtures are subject to change.
- All times are South African (GMT+2).

==== Regular season ====
===== Round one =====
2012-02-06	UCT Ikey Tigers	10 – 38	UFS Shimlas	UCT Rugby Fields
17:00	Try: Dillyn Leyds; Francois van Wyk	Report	Try: Kevin Luiters; PW van Vuuren; Pieter Rademan; Fanie van der Walt; Con: Nico Scheepers (4); Pen: Nico Scheepers (3)	Referee: Jason Jaftha

2012-02-06	UP Tuks	23 – 8	UJ	L.C. de Villiers Rugby Stadium
19:00	Try: Hayden Groepes; Franco Mostert; Jono Ross; Con: Wesley Dunlop (2); Pen: Wesley Dunlop	Report	Try: JR Esterhuizen; Con: Guy Cronjé	Referee: Joey Salmans

2012-02-06	Maties	52 – 2	TUT Vikings	Craven Stadium
19:00	Try: Wessel Coetzee; Grant Hattingh (3); Os Hamman (2); André Smith; Con: André Kemp (4); Donald Stevens; Pen: André Kemp	Report	Pen: Hansie Graaff	Referee: Ben Crouse

2012-02-06	NMMU Madibaz	16 – 26	NWU Pukke	Xerox NMMU Stadium
19:00	Try: Jaco Otto; Quinton Crocker; Con: Gerrit Smith (2)	Report	Try: Tiaan Dorfling; SW Oosthuizen; Andrew van Wyk (2); Con: Gerhard Nortier (2)	Referee: Pro Legoete

===== Round two =====
2012-02-13	TUT Vikings	0 – 40	UP Tuks	TUT Stadium
17:00		Report	Try: Clayton Blommetjies; Jacques Momberg; Dabeon Draghoender; Willie du Plessis penalty try Con: Wesley Dunlop; Willie du Plessis (4)	Referee: Quinton Immelman

2012-02-13	NWU Pukke	12 – 14	Maties	Fanie du Toit Stadium
19:00	Try: Andrew van Wyk; Con: Gerhard Nortier; Pen: Gerhard Nortier (2)	Report	Try: Ryan Nell; Gareth Light; Pen: André Kemp (2)	Referee: Tiaan Jonker

2012-02-13	UFS Shimlas	27 – 29	NMMU Madibaz	Xerox Shimla Park
19:00	Try: Robbie van Schalkwyk; Rynhardt Erwee; Oupa Nohoje; Con: Nico Scheepers (2); Pen: Nico Scheepers (3)	Report	Try: Jaco Swanepoel (2); Martin Ferreira; André Goosen; Con: Gerrit Smith; Bradley Kretzman (2)	Referee: Ben Crouse

2012-02-13	UJ	29 – 15	UCT Ikey Tigers	UJ Stadium
19:00	Try: Chrysander Botha; Rudi Paige; Shaun Malton; Jaco Kriel; Con: Guy Cronjé (3)	Report	Try: Nick Farrar; Damian de Allende; Con: Nick Holton; Pen: Nick Holton	Referee: Marius van der Westhuizen

===== Round three =====
2012-02-20	UJ	48 – 18	NMMU Madibaz	UJ Stadium
17:00	Try: Shaun Malton; Chrysander Botha (2); JR Esterhuizen; François du Toit; Justin Wheeler; Con: Guy Cronjé (6)	Report	Try: Ulrich Pretorius; Jaco Swanepoel; Roy Godfrey; Con: Gerrit Smith

2012-02-20	UP Tuks	40 – 20	NWU Pukke	L.C. de Villiers Rugby Stadium
19:00	Try: Jacques Verwey; Dabeon Draghoender; Jacques Momberg; Clayton Blommetjies; Lohan Jacobs; Con: Wesley Dunlop (5)	Report	Try: Andrew van Wyk (2); Marius Fourie; Con: Gerhard Nortier; Pen: Gerhard Nortier

2012-02-20	Maties	20 – 7	UFS Shimlas	Craven Stadium
19:00	Try: André Smith; Gareth Light; Brummer Badenhorst; Con: André Kemp; Pen: André Kemp	Report	Try: Jamba Ulengo; Pen: Nico Scheepers

2012-02-20	TUT Vikings	2 – 66	UCT Ikey Tigers	TUT Stadium
19:00	Pen: Ruan van Loo	Report	Try: Mark Winter; Liam Slatem; Dillyn Leyds; Rayn Smid (4); Digby Webb; Nathan Nel; Con: Nick Holton (7)

===== Round four =====
2012-02-27	NMMU Madibaz	23 – 21	UCT Ikey Tigers	Xerox NMMU Stadium
17:00	Try: Jaco Swanepoel; Quinton Crocker; Jaco Otto; Con: Gerrit Smith; Bradley Kretzman	Report	Try: Dillyn Leyds (2); Tiger Bax; Con: Nick Holton (2)	Referee: Quinton Immelman

2012-02-27	UFS Shimlas	18 – 50	UJ	Xerox Shimla Park
19:00	Try: Joubert Horn; Franna du Toit; Con: Nico Scheepers (2); Pen: Nico Scheepers	Report	Try: François du Toit; JR Esterhuizen (2); Ruan Dreyer; Chrysander Botha; Johan van Deventer; Shane Kirkwood; Con: Guy Cronjé (5)

2012-02-27	Maties	23 – 22	UP Tuks	Craven Stadium
19:00	Try: Ryan Nell; Grant Hattingh; Hein van der Merwe; Con: Donald Stevens; André Kemp; Pen: Donald Stevens	Report	Try: Grant Kemp; Clayton Blommetjies; Con: Wesley Dunlop (2); Pen: Wesley Dunlop (3)	Referee: Jason Jaftha

2012-02-27	NWU Pukke	52 – 8	TUT Vikings	Fanie du Toit Stadium
19:00	Try: Andrew van Wyk; Lodewyk Uys; Joubert Engelbrecht (3); Stompie de Wet; Tiaan Dorfling; Siya Mdaka; Con: Gerhard Nortier (3); Tiaan Dorfling	Report	Try: Hansie Graaff; Con: Melcolm Griffiths	Referee: Joey Salmans

===== Round Five =====
2012-03-05	UCT Ikey Tigers	29 – 29	NWU Pukke	UCT Rugby Fields
17:00	Try: Dillyn Leyds (2); Wesley Chetty; Mark Winter; Con: Nick Holton (3)	Report	Try: Stompie de Wet; Tiaan Dorfling; Joubert Engelbrecht; Gerhard Nortier; Con: Gerhard Nortier (3)	Referee: Jason Jaftha

2012-03-05	UP Tuks	48 – 18	UFS Shimlas	L.C. de Villiers Rugby Stadium
19:00	Try: Riaan Britz (2); Sabelo Nhlapo; Deon Helberg (2); Juan Schoeman; Con: Wesley Dunlop (6)		Try: Reinhardt Erwee; Fanie van der Walt; Con: Nico Scheepers (2); Pen: Nico Scheepers	Referee: Rasta Rashivenga

2012-03-05	UJ	93 – 0	TUT Vikings	UJ Stadium
19:00	Try: Shane Kirkwoord; Aubrey McDonald; JR Esterhuizen; Chrysander Botha (4); Theuns Kotzé; Divan van Zyl; Adrian Vermeulen; Wessel du Rand; Wendal Wehr; Con: Theuns Kotzé (11)	Report

2012-03-05	NMMU Madibaz	26 – 42	Maties	Xerox NMMU Stadium
19:00	Try: Jaco Otto; Carl van Niekerk (2); Tim Agaba; Con: Martin du Toit (2)	Report	Try: Rob Herring (3); Os Hamman; Wessel Coetzee (2); Con: André Kemp (3); André Smith

===== Round Six =====
2012-03-12	UFS Shimlas	56 – 36	TUT Vikings	Xerox Shimla Park
17:00	Try: Raymond Rhule; Armandt Koster; Stephan van der Merwe (2); Willie Britz; Divandré Strydom; Jamba Ulengo; Con: Nico Scheepers (7)	Report	Try: Gavin Engelbrecht; Hagen Mumba; Rikus de Beer; Wikus Botes; Con: Ruan van Loo (4); Pen: Ruan van Loo (2)	Referee: Quinton Immelman

2012-03-12	Maties	45 – 5	UCT Ikey Tigers	Craven Stadium
19:00	Try: Grant Hattingh (2); André Smith (2); Helmut Lehmann; Wessel Coetzee; Con: André Kemp (3); André Smith (2)	Report	Try: Rayn Smid	Referee: Ben Crouse

2012-03-12	UP Tuks	42 – 31	NMMU Madibaz	L.C. de Villiers Rugby Stadium
19:00	Try: Jacques Verwey; Hayden Groepes; Juan Schoeman; Clayton Stewart; Okkie Kruger; Dabeon Draghoender; Con: Willie du Plessis (4)	Report	Try: Howard Mnisi; Mayibuye Ndwandwa; Martin Ferreira; Martin du Toit; André Goosen; Con: Martin Du Toit (2)	Referee: Pro Legoete

2012-03-12	NWU Pukke	34 – 32	UJ	Fanie du Toit Stadium
19:00	Try: John-Roy Jenkinson; Spanner Pretorius (2); Tiaan Dorfling; Con: Gerhard Nortier (4); Pen: Gerhard Nortier	Report	Try: Chrysander Botha; François du Toit (2); Jacques Pretorius; Con: Guy Cronjé (4)	Referee: Tiaan Jonker

===== Round Seven =====
2012-03-19	UCT Ikey Tigers	18 – 29	UP Tuks	UCT Rugby Fields
17:00

2012-03-19	UJ	10 – 10	Maties	UJ Stadium
19:00

2012-03-19	NWU Pukke	64 – 24	UFS Shimlas	Fanie du Toit Stadium
19:00

2012-03-19	TUT Vikings	34 – 90	NMMU Madibaz	TUT Stadium
19:00

==== Play-off games ====
Semi-final
26 March 2012
UP Tuks	53
NWU Pukke	24
26 March 2012
Maties	23
UJ	00

Final
9 April 2012
UP Tuks	29
Maties	21

===== Semi-finals =====
26 March 2012
16:30

UP Tuks	53 – 24	NWU Pukke

L.C. de Villiers Rugby Stadium

26 March 2012
19:00

Maties	23 – 0	UJ

Craven Stadium

===== Final =====
9 April 2012
19:00

UP Tuks	29 – 21	Maties
Try: Trompie Pretorius 4'; Basil Short 33'; Lohan Jacobs 41'; Franco Mostert 64'; Con: Wesley Dunlop 34', 42', 65' (3/4)		Try: André Smith 20'; Hugo Kloppers 36'; Hein van der Merwe 82'; Con: Donald Stevens 21' (1/2); André Kemp 83' (1/1)

L.C. de Villiers Rugby Stadium

Tuks	Maties

FB	15	Clayton Blommetjies
RW	14	Deon Helberg
OC	13	Jerome Pretorius
IC	12	Dabeon Draghoender
LW	11	Hayden Groepes
FH	10	Wesley Dunlop
SH	9	Lohan Jacobs
N8	8	Jono Ross (c)
OF	7	Jacques Verwey
BF	6	Okkie Kruger
RL	5	Franco Mostert
LL	4	Mike Williams
TP	3	Grant Kemp
HK	2	Zane Botha
LP	1	Sabelo Nhlapo (c)
Replacements:
	16	Kurt Haupt
	17	Juan Schoeman
	18	Sthembiso Mlongo
	19	Wiaan Liebenberg
	20	Rudi van Rooyen
	21	Willie du Plessis
	22	Courtnall Skosan
	23	Basil Short
Coach:
Nollis Marais

FB	15	André Smith
RW	14	Ryan Nell
OC	13	Wessel Coetzee
IC	12	Louis Jordaan
LW	11	Dean Hammond
FH	10	Andre Kemp
SH	9	Donald Stevens
N8	8	Grant Hattingh
OF	7	Helmut Lehmann (c)
BF	6	Sam Mabombo
RL	5	Hugo Kloppers
LL	4	Reinel Hugo
TP	3	Os Hamman
HK	2	Rob Herring
LP	1	Alister Vermaak
Replacements:
	16	Alfred Ries
	17	Brummer Badenhorst
	18	JP Swanepoel
	19	Nicholas de Jager
	20	Boela Abrahams
	21	Jarryd Buys
	22	Clearance Khumalo
	23	Hein van der Merwe
Coach:
Chris Rossouw

Player of the Match:
Not documented UP Tuks

Assistant referees:
Tiaan Jonker & Ben Crouse (South Africa), Jaco Kotze (South Africa)

Television match official:
Johann Meuwesen (South Africa)

=== Honours ===
2012 FNB Varsity Cup Champions:	UP Tuks (1st title)
Player That Rocks:	Wesley Dunlop, UP Tuks
Forward That Rocks:	Jaco Swanepoel, NMMU Madibaz
Back That Rocks:	Clayton Blommetjies, UP Tuks
Top Try Scorers:	Chrysander Botha, UJ; Andrew van Wyk, NWU Pukke (9)
Top Points Scorer:	Wesley Dunlop, UP Tuks (83)

== Varsity Shield ==
2012 Varsity Shield
- Champions: Wits
- Runners-up: CUT Ixias
- Promoted: Wits
- Matches played: 21
- Tries scored: 126 (average 6 per match)
- Top point scorer: Jannie Myburgh, CUT Ixias (108)
- Top try scorer: Inus Kritzinger, CUT Ixias; Alec Mhlanga, CUT Ixias; Cheslyn Roberts, UWC (6)

=== Competition Rules ===
There are five participating universities in the 2012 Varsity Shield. These teams will play each other twice over the course of the season, once at home and once away.

Teams receive four points for a win and two points for a draw. Bonus points are awarded to teams that score four or more tries in a game, as well as to teams that lose a match by seven points or less. Teams are ranked by log points, then points difference (points scored less points conceded).

The top two teams will qualify for the title play-offs. The team that finishes first will have home advantage against the team that finishes second.

The team that wins the Varsity Shield will be promoted to the 2013 Varsity Cup.

The team that loses in the play-off final will play a promotion/relegation match against the seventh placed Varsity Cup team for a place in the 2013 Varsity Cup.

The team that finishes bottom might also be challenged to play in a play-off.

=== Participating teams ===
Location of teams in 2012 Varsity Shield

Varsity Shield
Team Name	University	Stadium
CUT Ixias	Central University of Technology	CUT Stadium
UFH Blues	University of Fort Hare	Davidson Rugby Field
UKZN Impi	University of KwaZulu-Natal	Peter Booysen Sports Park
UWC	University of the Western Cape	UWC Sport Stadium
Wits	University of the Witwatersrand	Wits Rugby Stadium

=== Standings ===
2012 Varsity Shield Log
	Team	Played	Won	Drawn	Lost	Points For	Points Against	Points Difference	Tries For	Tries Against	Try Bonus	Losing Bonus	Points
1	CUT Ixias	8	6	0	2	283	120	+163	35	12	4	1	29
2	Wits	8	6	1	1	210	124	+86	25	16	3	0	29
3	UWC	8	4	0	4	230	242	-12	29	34	4	1	21
4	UFH Blues	8	3	1	4	143	235	-92	17	30	1	0	15
5	UKZN Impi	8	0	0	8	111	256	-145	16	30	1	2	3
The top 2 teams qualified for the Final. The winner of the Final will be promoted. The loser of the Final will play in the promotion/relegation play-off. Points breakdown: *4 points for a win *2 points for a draw *1 bonus point for a loss by seven points or less *1 bonus point for scoring four or more tries in a match

=== Fixtures and results ===
- Fixtures are subject to change.
- All times are South African (GMT+2).

==== Regular season ====
===== Round one =====
2012-01-30	CUT Ixias	25 – 12	Wits	CUT Stadium
17:00	Tries: Inus Kritzinger; Stephen Griesel; Danie van der Merwe; Con: Jannie Myburgh (2); Pen: Jannie Myburgh (2)	Report	Try: Ryan Odendaal; Con: Kyle Peyper; Pens: Kyle Peyper (2); Cards: Charles Baggott (yellow card)	Referee: François Groenewald

2012-01-30	UFH Blues	13 – 36	UWC	Davidson Rugby Field
19:00	Tries: Abongile Dlani; Sihle Mtwa; Con: Teboho Makuru; Cards: Vuyisani Mavuso (yellow card); Itumeleng Mokae (yellow card)	Report	Tries: Cheslyn Roberts (3) penalty try Cons: Charl van Vollenhoven (2); Warrick Rhoda (2); Pen: Charl van Vollenhoven; Warrick Rhoda; Cards: Garth Adense (yellow card); Samuel Borsah (yellow card)	Referee: Lusanda Jam

Bye/s: UKZN Impi

===== Round two =====
2012-02-03	Wits	58 – 16	UFH Blues	Wits Rugby Stadium
19:00	Tries: Riaan Arends (2); Brent Crossley; Devin Montgomery; Charles Baggott; Oliver Rochat; Ruan Noeth; Heinke Hartdegen; Cons: Kyle Peyper (6)	Report	Tries: Garth van Rayner (2); Cons: Teboho Makuru (2); Cards: Nkosi Nofuma (yellow card)	Referee: Gerrie de Bruin

2012-02-03	UKZN Impi	10 – 30	CUT Ixias	Peter Booysen Sports Park
19:00	Tries: Leon Stevens; Hanno Botha; Cards: Gerrit Fourie (yellow card)	Report	Tries: Baksteen van Heerden; Nico Steenkamp; Inus Kritzinger; Cons: Jannie Myburgh (3); Pens: Jannie Myburgh (2); DG: Jannie Myburgh; Cards: Juan Hugo (red card)	Referee: Archie Sehlako

Bye/s: UWC

===== Round three =====
2012-02-06	Wits	43 – 20	UWC	Wits Rugby Stadium
19:00	Tries: Rinus Bothma; Bronson Lange; Charles Baggott; Devin Montgomery; Riaan Arends; Sam Peters; Cons: Kyle Peyper (3); Pens: Kyle Peyper (2)	Report	Tries: Njabulo Ndlovu; Maxwel Andrews; Cheslyn Roberts; Con: Ambrose Steyn; Pen: Charl van Vollenhoven	Referee: Pieter Janse van Vuuren

2012-02-06	UFH Blues	36 – 21	UKZN Impi	Davidson Rugby Field
19:00	Tries: Garth van Rayner (2); Onke Dubase; Aziyena Mandaba; Sibabalwe Mtsulwana; Cons: Masixole Banda (3); Pen: Masixole Banda	Report	Tries: Leon Stevens; Carl Meyer; Marc Colia; Cons: Carl Meyer; Jaco Potgieter	Referee: Marius van der Westhuizen

Bye/s: CUT Ixias

===== Round four =====
2012-02-13	UWC	61 – 10	UKZN Impi	UWC Sport Stadium
19:00	Tries: Cheslyn Roberts (2); Warrick Rhoda; Charlton van Jaarsveld; Oswill Mentoor; Denzil Lindoor; Denzil Willemse; JP Kellerman; Cons: Ambrose Steyn (7)	Report	Tries: Levi Swartz; Leon Stevens	Referee: François Groenewald

2012-02-13	CUT Ixias	34 – 19	UFH Blues	CUT Stadium
19:00	Tries: Danie van der Merwe; Alec Mhlanga; Charles Hitchcock; Gavin Annandale; Cons: Jannie Myburgh (2); Inus Kritzinger (2); Pen: Jannie Myburgh	Report	Tries: Sanesilo Ngoma; Billy Dutton; Con: Masixole Banda; Pens: Masixole Banda (3)	Referee: Pieter Janse van Vuuren

Bye/s: Wits

===== Round Five =====
2012-02-20	UWC	37 – 23	CUT Ixias	UWC Sport Stadium
19:00	Tries: Donavon Williams; Njabulo Ndlovu; Warrick Rhoda; Justin McKay; Cons: Ambrose Steyn (3); Pens: Ambrose Steyn (4)	Report	Jannie Myburgh; Alec Mhlanga; Gavin Annandale; Cons: Jannie Myburgh (2); Pen: Jannie Myburgh	Referee: Gerrie de Bruin

2012-02-20	UKZN Impi	10 – 18	Wits	Peter Booysen Sports Park
19:00	Tries: Hanno Botha; Levy Swartz	Report	Tries: Rinus Bothma; Con: Kyle Peyper; Pens: Kyle Peyper (3); Blake Dismore; DG: Kyle Peyper	Referee: Lusanda Jam

Bye/s: UFH Blues

===== Round Six =====
2012-02-27	Wits	20 – 16	CUT Ixias	Wits Rugby Stadium
19:00	Tries: Brent Crossley; KK Kgame; Cons: Kyle Peyper (2); Pens: Kyle Peyper (2)	Report	Tries: Grant Shai; Petri Coetzee; Cons: Jannie Myburgh (2)

2012-02-27	UWC	21 – 23	UFH Blues	UWC Sport Stadium
19:00	Tries: Bradley Mentoor (2); Frederick Muller Cons: Ambrose Steyn (2)	Report	Tries: Lundi Ralarala; Masixole Banda (2); Cons: Masixole Banda (2); Pen: Masixole Banda	Referee: Archie Sehlako

Bye/s: UKZN Impi

===== Round Seven =====
2012-03-05	UFH Blues	10 – 10	Wits	Davidson Rugby Field
17:00	Try: Masixole Banda; Con: Masixole Banda; Pen: Masixole Banda	Report	Try: Charles Baggott; Con: Kyle Peyper; Pen: Kyle Peyper	Referee: Gerrie de Bruin

2012-03-05	CUT Ixias	42 – 4	UKZN Impi	CUT Stadium
19:00

Bye/s: UWC

===== Round Eight =====
2012-03-12	CUT Ixias	73 – 8	UWC	CUT Stadium
19:00		Report

2012-03-12	Wits	21 – 12	UKZN Impi	Wits Rugby Stadium
19:00		Report

Bye/s: UFH Blues

===== Round Nine =====
2012-03-19	UWC	15 – 28	Wits	UWC Sport Stadium
19:00

2012-03-19	UKZN Impi	15 – 16	UFH Blues	Peter Booysen Sports Park
19:00

Bye/s: CUT Ixias

===== Round Ten =====
2012-03-26	UKZN Impi	29 – 32	UWC	Peter Booysen Sports Park
19:00

2012-03-26	UFH Blues	10 – 40	CUT Ixias	Davidson Rugby Field
19:00

Bye/s: Wits

==== Play-off games ====
===== Final =====
2012-04-02	CUT Ixias	17 – 19	Wits	CUT Stadium
17:00		Report		Referee: Gerrie de Bruin

=== Squads ===
The following players made at least one matchday squad during the season:

=== Honours ===
2012 FNB Varsity Shield Champions:	Wits (1st title)
Player That Rocks:	Masixole Banda, UFH Blues
Forward That Rocks:	Charlton van Jaarsveld, UWC
Back That Rocks:	Inus Kritzinger, CUT Ixias
Top Try Scorers:	Inus Kritzinger, CUT Ixias; Alec Mhlanga, CUT Ixias; Cheslyn Roberts, UWC (6)
Top Points Scorer:	Jannie Myburgh, CUT Ixias (108)

== Promotion/relegation ==
- Wits was promoted to the 2013 Varsity Cup.
- TUT Vikings was relegated to the 2013 Varsity Shield.
- UCT Ikey Tigers beat CUT Ixias in a promotion/relegation game and will play in the 2013 Varsity Cup, while CUT Ixias will play in the 2013 Varsity Shield.
- UKZN Impi beat NWU Vaal Triangle in a promotion/relegation game and will play in the 2013 Varsity Shield.

=== Promotion/relegation play-off ===
==== 2013 Varsity Cup play-off ====
2012-04-09	UCT Ikey Tigers	60 – 21	CUT Ixias
15:00		Report

==== 2013 Varsity Shield play-off ====
2012-07-28	UKZN Impi	14 – 8	NWU Vaal Triangle
15:00		Scoreboard

== Young Guns ==
=== Competition Rules ===
There are eight participating universities in the 2012 Young Guns competition. These teams are divided into two pools (the FNB pool and the Steinhoff pool) and will play the other teams in the pool once over the course of the season, either home or away.

Teams receive four points for a win and two points for a draw. Bonus points are awarded to teams that score four or more tries in a game, as well as to teams that lose a match by seven points or less. Teams are ranked by log points, then points difference (points scored less points conceded).

The top two teams in each pool will qualify for the title play-offs. In the semi-finals, the teams that finish first will have home advantage against the teams that finish second in their respective pools. The winners of these semi-finals will play each other in the final.

=== Participating teams ===
Young Guns
Team Name	Sponsored Name	University	Stadium
Maties Juniors	Steinhoff Maties Juniors	Stellenbosch University	Craven Stadium
NMMU Young Guns	FNB NMMU Young Guns	Nelson Mandela Metropolitan University	Xerox NMMU Stadium
NWU Pukke Young Guns	FNB NWU Pukke Young Guns	North-West University	Fanie du Toit Stadium
TUT Vikings Young Guns	FNB TUT Vikings Young Guns	Tshwane University of Technology	TUT Stadium
UCT Trojans	FNB UCT Trojans	University of Cape Town	UCT Rugby Fields
UFS Shimlas Young Guns	FNB UFS Shimlas Young Guns	University of the Free State	Xerox Shimla Park
UJ Young Guns	FNB UJ Young Guns	University of Johannesburg	UJ Stadium
UP Tuks Young Guns	FNB UP Tuks Young Guns	University of Pretoria	L.C. de Villiers Rugby Stadium

=== Standings ===
2012 Young Guns FNB Pool Log
	Team	Played	Won	Drawn	Lost	Points For	Points Against	Points Difference	Tries For	Tries Against	Try Bonus	Losing Bonus	Points
1	UP Tuks Young Guns	3	3	0	0	248	41	+207	32	5	3	0	15
2	UFS Shimlas Young Guns	3	2	0	1	147	76	+71	20	8	3	1	12
3	UCT Trojans	3	1	0	2	73	95	-22	9	13	1	1	6
4	TUT Vikings	3	0	0	3	22	278	-256	2	37	0	0	0
2012 Young Guns Steinhoff Pool Log
	Team	Played	Won	Drawn	Lost	Points For	Points Against	Points Difference	Tries For	Tries Against	Try Bonus	Losing Bonus	Points
1	Maties Juniors	3	2	0	1	128	52	+76	18	6	3	1	12
2	NWU Pukke Young Guns	3	2	0	1	139	55	+84	17	8	2	1	11
3	UJ Young Guns	3	2	0	1	106	79	+27	14	10	2	1	11
4	NMMU Young Guns	3	0	0	3	21	208	-187	3	28	0	0	0
The top 2 teams in each pool will qualify for the semi-finals. Points breakdown: *4 points for a win *2 points for a draw *1 bonus point for a loss by seven points or less *1 bonus point for scoring four or more tries in a match

=== Fixtures and results ===
- Fixtures are subject to change.
- All times are South African (GMT+2).

==== Regular season ====
===== Round one =====
2012-02-06	UCT Trojans	20 – 27	UFS Shimlas Young Guns	UCT Rugby Fields
17:00

2012-02-06	NMMU Young Guns	5 – 87	NWU Pukke Young Guns	Xerox NMMU Stadium
17:00		Report

===== Round two =====
2012-02-13	TUT Vikings Young Guns	0 – 146	UP Tuks Young Guns	TUT Stadium
15:20		Report

2012-02-13	NWU Pukke Young Guns	20 – 23	Maties Juniors	Fanie du Toit Stadium
17:00

===== Round three =====
2012-02-20	UJ Young Guns	47 – 16	NMMU Young Guns	UJ Stadium
15:20

2012-02-20	TUT Vikings Young Guns	2 – 45	UCT Trojans	TUT Stadium
17:00

===== Round Five =====
2012-03-05	UP Tuks Young Guns	36 – 33	UFS Shimlas Young Guns	L.C. de Villiers Rugby Stadium
15:20		Report

===== Round Six =====
2012-03-12	UFS Shimlas Young Guns	89 – 20	TUT Vikings Young Guns	Xerox Shimla Park
15:20		Report

2012-03-12	Maties Juniors	74 – 0	NMMU Young Guns	Craven Stadium
17:00		Report

2012-03-12	NWU Pukke Young Guns	32 – 27	UJ Young Guns	Fanie du Toit Stadium
17:00		Report

===== Round Seven =====
2012-03-19	UJ Young Guns	32 – 31	Maties Juniors	UJ Stadium
17:00

2012-03-19	UCT Trojans	8 – 66	UP Tuks Young Guns	UCT Rugby Fields
19:00

==== Play-off games ====
===== Semi-finals =====
2012-03-26	Maties Juniors	28 – 8	UFS Shimlas Young Guns	Craven Stadium

2012-03-26	UP Tuks Young Guns	23 – 18	NWU Pukke Young Guns	L.C. de Villiers Rugby Stadium

===== Final =====
2012-04-02	Maties Juniors	26 – 35	UP Tuks Young Guns	Craven Stadium

=== Honours ===
2012 FNB Young Guns Champions:	UP Tuks Young Guns (1st title)

== Koshuis Rugby Championship ==
=== Competition Rules ===
There are eight participating teams in the 2012 Koshuis Rugby Championship - the winners of the internal leagues of each of the eight Varsity Cup teams. These teams are divided into two pools (the Penny Pinchers pool and the Hertz pool) and will play the other teams in the pool once over the course of the season, either home or away.

Teams receive four points for a win and two points for a draw. Bonus points are awarded to teams that score four or more tries in a game, as well as to teams that lose a match by seven points or less. Teams are ranked by log points, then points difference (points scored less points conceded).

The top two teams in each pool will qualify for the title play-offs. In the semi-finals, the teams that finish first will have home advantage against the teams that finish second in their respective pools. The winners of these semi-finals will play each other in the final.

=== Participating teams ===
Koshuis Rugby Championship
Koshuis Name	University Team Name	University Team
Bastion	UJ	University of Johannesburg
Cobras	UCT Ikey Tigers	University of Cape Town
Dagbreek	Maties	Stellenbosch University
Monitor	TUT Vikings	Tshwane University of Technology
Mopanie	UP Tuks	University of Pretoria
Oppidani	NMMU Madibaz	Nelson Mandela Metropolitan University
Patria	NWU Pukke	North-West University
Vishuis	UFS Shimlas	University of the Free State

=== Standings ===
2012 Koshuis Rugby Championship Penny Pinchers Pool Log
	Team	Played	Won	Drawn	Lost	Points For	Points Against	Points Difference	Bonus Points	Points
1	Vishuis, UFS Shimlas	3	3	0	0	174	45	+129	2	14
2	Dagbreek, Maties	3	2	0	1	72	46	+26	2	10
3	Mopanie, UP Tuks	3	1	0	2	75	50	+25	3	7
4	Monitor, TUT Vikings	3	0	0	3	37	217	-180	0	0
2012 Koshuis Rugby Championship Hertz Pool Log
	Team	Played	Won	Drawn	Lost	Points For	Points Against	Points Difference	Bonus Points	Points
1	Patria, NWU Pukke	3	2	0	1	156	57	+99	4	12
2	Cobras, UCT Ikey Tigers	3	2	0	1	96	61	+35	3	11
3	Bastion, UJ	3	2	0	1	84	86	-2	1	9
4	Oppidani, NMMU Madibaz	3	0	0	3	36	168	-132	0	0
The top 2 teams in each pool will qualify for the semi-finals. Points breakdown: *4 points for a win *2 points for a draw *1 bonus point for a loss by seven points or less *1 bonus point for scoring four or more tries in a match

=== Fixtures and results ===
- All times are South African (GMT+2).

==== Regular season ====
===== Round one =====
2012-02-13	Bastion, UJ	26 – 24	Cobras, UCT Ikey Tigers	UJ Stadium
17:00		Report

2012-02-13	Monitor, TUT Vikings	8 – 42	Mopanie, UP Tuks	TUT Stadium
19:00		Report

===== Round two =====
2012-02-20	Dagbreek, Maties	14 – 15	Vishuis, UFS Shimlas	Craven Stadium
17:00		Report

2012-02-20	Bastion, UJ	37 – 18	Oppidani, NMMU Madibaz	UJ Stadium
19:00		Report

===== Round three =====
2012-02-27	Dagbreek, Maties	16 – 15	Mopanie, UP Tuks	Craven Stadium
17:00		Report

2012-02-27	Oppidani, NMMU Madibaz	10 – 44	Cobras, UCT Ikey Tigers	Xerox NMMU Stadium
19:00		Report

===== Round four =====
2012-03-05	Cobras, UCT Ikey Tigers	28 – 25	Patria, NWU Pukke	UCT Rugby Fields
17:00		Report

2012-03-05	Mopanie, UP Tuks	18 – 26	Vishuis, UFS Shimlas	L.C. de Villiers Rugby Stadium
17:00		Report

===== Round Five =====
2012-03-12	Patria, NWU Pukke	44 – 21	Bastion, UJ	Fanie du Toit Stadium
17:00		Report

2012-03-12	Vishuis, UFS Shimlas	133 – 13	Monitor, TUT Vikings	Xerox Shimla Park
19:00		Report

==== Play-off games ====
===== Semi-finals =====
2012-03-26	Patria, NWU Pukke	9 – 12	Dagbreek, Maties	Fanie du Toit Stadium
18:00		Report

2012-03-26	Vishuis, UFS Shimlas	30 – 5	Cobras, UCT Ikey Tigers	Xerox Shimla Park
19:00		Report

===== Final =====
2012-04-09	Dagbreek, Maties	26 – 44	Vishuis, UFS Shimlas	Craven Stadium
16:45		Report

=== Honours ===
2012 Steinhoff Koshuis Rugby Champions:	Vishuis, UFS Shimlas (2nd title)

== See also ==
- Varsity Cup
- 2012 Currie Cup Premier Division
- 2012 Currie Cup First Division
- 2012 Vodacom Cup
