= François du Toit =

South African rugby union player (born 1990)

- Born: 17 August 1990 (age 36) Johannesburg, South Africa
- Height: 1.78 m (5 ft 10 in)
- Weight: 105 kg (16 st 7 lb; 231 lb)
- School: Hoërskool Florida, Roodepoort
- University: University of Johannesburg

Rugby union career
- Position: Hooker
- Current team: FC Barcelona
Youth career
- 2007–2011: Golden Lions
Amateur team(s)
Years	Team	Apps	(Points)
2011–2014	UJ	17	(25)
Senior career
Years	Team	Apps	(Points)
2011–2013	Golden Lions XV	14	(15)
2012–2013	Golden Lions	3	(0)
2013–2016	Pumas	46	(30)
2016–present	FC Barcelona	5	(5)
- Correct as of 9 October 2016
International career
Years	Team	Apps	(Points)
2010	South Africa Under-20	4	(0)
2012	South Africa Students	2	(0)
- Correct as of 1 April 2015

François du Toit is a South African rugby union player, currently playing with Spanish División de Honor side FC Barcelona. His usual position is hooker.

== Career ==
He came through the Golden Lions youth system and played for them at various youth levels.

Despite being named on the bench for the opening game of the 2010 Currie Cup Premier Division season, he only made his debut 2 years later in the 2012 Vodacom Cup game against the Leopards.

He was then also included in the squad for the 2012 Currie Cup Premier Division.

He also represented UJ in the 2011 and 2012 Varsity Cup competitions.

He was a member of the Pumas side that won the Vodacom Cup for the first time in 2015, beating Western Province 24–7 in the final. Du Toit made four appearances during the season, scoring one try.

=== Barcelona ===
After the 2016 Currie Cup, Du Toit joined Spanish División de Honor side FC Barcelona.
