= Ryan Nell =

South African rugby union player

- Full name: Ryan Desmond Nell
- Born: 4 September 1990 (age 36) Port Elizabeth, South Africa
- Height: 1.92 m (6 ft 3 1/2 in)
- Weight: 97 kg (15 st 4 lb; 214 lb)
- School: Paarl Gimnasium, Paarl
- University: Stellenbosch University

Rugby union career
- Position: Centre / Winger / Full-back
- Current team: Pumas / RFCLA
Youth career
- 2009–2011: Western Province
Amateur team(s)
Years	Team	Apps	(Points)
2011–2013	Maties	25	(35)
2014–2015	UP Tuks	8	(5)
Senior career
Years	Team	Apps	(Points)
2013	Western Province	2	(0)
2014–2015	Blue Bulls	9	(10)
2016	Boland Cavaliers	18	(65)
2017–present	Pumas	30	(50)
2020–present	RFCLA	5	(0)
- Correct as of 3 March 2021
International career
Years	Team	Apps	(Points)
2012	South Africa Sevens		
2013	South African Universities	1	(0)
- Correct as of 11 May 2014

Ryan Desmond Nell (born 4 September 1990 in Port Elizabeth) is a South African rugby union player for the Pumas in the Currie Cup and RFCLA in Major League Rugby (MLR) in the United States. He is a utility back that can play as a centre, winger or full-back.

== Career ==
=== Youth and Varsity Cup rugby ===
He represented the Western Province U19 and Western Province U21 teams between 2009 and 2011 and also played for university side Maties in the 2011, 2012 and 2013 Varsity Cup competitions.

=== Western Province ===
His first class debut came during the 2013 Currie Cup Premier Division, when he came on as a substitute for Western Province against the Free State Cheetahs at Newlands Stadium, Cape Town.

=== Blue Bulls ===
He joined the Blue Bulls for the 2014 season.

=== Boland Cavaliers ===
He joined Wellington-based side Boland Cavaliers on trial prior to the 2016 season.

=== Rugby ATL ===
Nell joined Major League Rugby side Rugby ATL for the 2020 Major League Rugby season.

=== Sevens rugby ===
In 2012, he was included in the S.A. Sevens side and played in two tournaments in the 2011–12 IRB Sevens World Series, the 2012 Scotland Sevens and the 2012 London Sevens.
