= Deon Helberg =

South African rugby union player

- Full name: Gideon Gerhardus Helberg
- Born: 27 September 1989 (age 37) Lichtenburg, South Africa
- Height: 1.86 m (6 ft 1 in)
- Weight: 96 kg (15 st 2 lb; 212 lb)
- School: Middelburg Technical High School
- University: University of Pretoria

Rugby union career
- Position: Wing
- Current team: Pumas
Youth career
- 2002–2007: Pumas
- 2008–2010: Blue Bulls
Amateur team(s)
Years	Team	Apps	(Points)
2010–2012	UP Tuks	17	(40)
Senior career
Years	Team	Apps	(Points)
2010	Blue Bulls	10	(20)
2010	Bulls	1	(0)
2012–2013	Golden Lions	18	(25)
2013–2014	Golden Lions XV	10	(10)
2013	Lions	1	(0)
2015–2017	Pumas	14	(5)
- Correct as of 18 May 2018
International career
Years	Team	Apps	(Points)
2007	S.A. Schools		
2009	South Africa Sevens		
- Correct as of 19 September 2012

Gideon Gerhardus Helberg is a South African rugby union player who most recently played for the Pumas in the Currie Cup and Vodacom Cup. His usual position is wing.

He also played for UP Tuks in the 2010, 2011 and 2012 Varsity Cup competitions.

In 2011 it was revealed that he was involved in an affair with his girlfriend's mother, which led to a fake death photo of Helberg being supplied. The mother pleaded guilty to "enticement to commit assault with intent to do grievous bodily harm" and was given a suspended three-year jail sentence in November 2011.
