= Jono Ross =

South African rugby union player

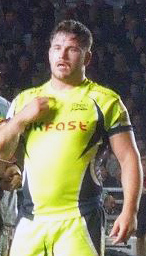
- Jonathan "Jono" Ross
- Full name: Jonathan Montague Ross
- Born: 27 October 1990 (age 36) Sandton, South Africa
- Height: 1.91 m (6 ft 3 in)
- Weight: 111 kg (245 lb; 17 st 7 lb)
- School: St Stithians College
- University: University of South Africa; University of Pretoria

Rugby union career
- Position(s): Flanker, Number 8
Youth career
- 2007–2008: Golden Lions
- 2010–2012: Blue Bulls
Amateur team(s)
| Years | Team | Apps | (Points) |
| 2011–2013 | UP Tuks | 19 | (35) |
Senior career
| Years | Team | Apps | (Points) |
| 2011–2012 | Blue Bulls | 12 | (5) |
| 2012–2013 | Saracens | 2 | (0) |
| 2013–2014 | Bulls | 19 | (20) |
| 2013–2014 | Blue Bulls | 21 | (5) |
| 2014–2017 | Stade Français | 67 | (40) |
| 2017–2023 | Sale Sharks | 150 | (65) |
- Correct as of 27 May 2023

Jonathan "Jono" Ross (born 27 October 1990 in Sandton, Johannesburg) is a South African former rugby union player who played mostly as a blindside flanker but also played at number 8.

== Career ==
=== Youth ===
Ross started off playing for the Golden Lions and represented them at the 2007 and 2008 Under-18 Academy Week tournaments. He also represented them in the 2008 Under-19 Provincial Championship competition.

Ross then joined the Blue Bulls and played for their Under-21 team in 2010 and 2011.

=== Varsity Cup ===
In addition to playing for the Blue Bulls, Ross also represented UP Tuks in the annual Varsity Cup competition in 2011, 2012 and 2013.

=== Blue Bulls ===
Ross made his senior debut in 2011, coming on as a substitute in the 2011 Vodacom Cup match against SWD Eagles, as well as in the quarter-final match against former team the Golden Lions.

Ross made his debut in the Currie Cup competition a few months later in 2011 against Griquas and made one further appearance that season. He established himself as a regular in the team for the 2012 Vodacom Cup, making eight starts and scoring a try.

=== Saracens ===
At the conclusion of the 2012 Vodacom Cup, Ross joined English side Saracens for one season, making two appearances in the 2012–13 LV Cup.

=== Back to the Bulls ===
In 2013, Ross returned to the Blue Bulls and was called into the Bulls Super Rugby side for their match against the Southern Kings, making four appearances in total during the 2013 Super Rugby season including their semi-final elimination against ACT Brumbies.

In only his third ever Currie Cup match – in the 2013 Currie Cup Premier Division season against Western Province – Ross was named captain of the Blue Bulls, becoming the first-ever English-speaking captain of the team. At the end of 2013, he signed a contract extension to tie him to the Blue Bulls until October 2016.

Ross was included in the Bulls squad for the 2014 Super Rugby season and, after four substitute appearances in 2013, made his first Super Rugby start in a 31–16 defeat to the Sharks in Durban.

=== Stade Français ===
In November 2014, the Bulls announced that they granted Ross an early release from his contract to join French Top 14 side Stade Français. In his first season he played in the 2014–15 Top 14 season final as Stade Français defeated ASM Clermont Auvergne to become Champions of France. In his last season at the club he started in the 2016–17 European Rugby Challenge Cup final at Murrayfield as they overcame Gloucester to lift the trophy.

=== Sale Sharks ===
On 11 April 2017, it was announced that Ross would return to England to join Premiership Rugby club Sale Sharks on a three-year contract starting in the 2017-18 season. Ross qualified to represent England through a grandparent and at the end of his first season with Sale in May 2018 was called up by coach Eddie Jones to train with the senior England squad although ultimately he did not make an appearance at international level.

Ross was named club captain for the 2018-19 season, taking over from Will Addison. He continued as captain for the 2019–20 campaign and led Sale to their first silverware since 2006 when they defeated Harlequins in the 2019–20 Premiership Rugby Cup final. He was retained as captain for the 2020-2021 and 2021-2022 seasons.

Ross played the last game of his career when he started in the 2022–23 Premiership Rugby final at Twickenham Stadium which Sale lost against Saracens to finish runners up. At the end of that season he retired from the sport.
