= Grant Kemp =

- Full name: Grant Dale Kemp
- Born: 31 October 1988 (age 38) Cape Town
- Height: 1.87 m (6 ft 1 1/2 in)
- Weight: 139 kg (306 lb; 21 st 12 lb)
- School: Wynberg Boys' High School
- University: UCT Ikey Tigers, UP Tuks

Rugby union career
- Position: Prop
- Current team: SWD Eagles
Amateur team(s)
Years	Team	Apps	(Points)
2010	UCT Ikey Tigers	9	(5)
2011–2012	UP Tuks	15	(10)
Senior career
Years	Team	Apps	(Points)
2012–2014	SWD Eagles	43	(20)
2013	Southern Kings	13	(0)
- Correct as of 16 November 2018
International career
Years	Team	Apps	(Points)
2018–present	Hong Kong	5	(0)
- Correct as of 3 October 2014

Grant Dale Kemp is a South African-born Hong Kong international rugby union player, currently playing with the Hong Kong national team and Valley in the Hong Kong Premiership. His regular position is prop.

== Career ==
He also played Varsity Cup rugby for UCT Ikey Tigers in 2010 and for UP Tuks in 2011 and 2012, which led to his joining the SWD Eagles for the 2012 Currie Cup First Division.

He established himself a first team regular, and was called up to the Southern Kings for the 2013 Super Rugby season.
