= Aubrey McDonald =

South African rugby union player

- Full name: Aubrey Neville McDonald
- Born: 3 February 1988 (age 38) Port Elizabeth, South Africa
- Height: 1.84 m (6 ft 1/2 in)
- Weight: 87 kg (13 st 10 lb; 192 lb)
- School: Winterberg Agricultural High School, Fort Beaufort
- University: University of Johannesburg

Rugby union career
- Position: Winger / Fullback / Centre
- Current team: Rustenburg Impala
Youth career
- 2005: Eastern Province Kings
- 2006–2009: Blue Bulls
Amateur team(s)
| Years | Team | Apps | (Points) |
| 2008 | TUT Vikings | 6 | (5) |
| 2009 | UP Tuks | 0 | (0) |
| 2010–2012 | UJ | 22 | (40) |
| 2015–present | Rustenburg Impala | 7 | (15) |
Senior career
| Years | Team | Apps | (Points) |
| 2008 | Blue Bulls | 1 | (0) |
| 2013–2014 | Griffons | 26 | (25) |
- Correct as of 7 April 2015
International career
| Years | Team | Apps | (Points) |
| 2005–2006 | South Africa Schools | | |
| 2007 | South Africa Under-19 | | |
- Correct as of 22 October 2014

Aubrey Neville McDonald (born 3 February 1988 in Port Elizabeth, South Africa) is a South African rugby union player, currently playing with club side Rustenburg Impala. He is a utility back that can play as a fullback, winger or centre.

== Career ==
=== Youth ===
His first taste of provincial rugby came in 2005, when he was selected in the Eastern Province side that reached the final of the Under-18 Craven Week competition in 2005. Despite being beaten 38–15 in the unofficial final against their Golden Lions counterparts, McDonald's performances led to his inclusion in the 2005 South African Schools side. He scored two tries for them as they beat France 52–13 and scored another two tries as the South African Schools team lost 30–24 to a South African Academy team. He also represented the Eastern Province U19 side in the 2005 Under-19 Provincial Championship.

In 2006, McDonald moved to Pretoria, finishing his schooling at Hoërskool Waterkloof. He had another opportunity to play in the Craven Week tournament in 2006, this time in the colours of the Blue Bulls. Once again, McDonald was selected in the South African Schools side, this time to play a side from Italy. He also represented the Blue Bulls U19 and Blue Bulls U21 sides towards the end of 2006.

In 2007, he was included in the Blue Bulls squad for the 2007 Vodacom Cup competition, but failed to make an appearance. He was involved at international level again though, representing South Africa at the 2007 Under 19 Rugby World Championship which was held in Ireland. He helped South Africa reach the final of the competition, where they lost 31–7 to New Zealand. Upon his return to South Africa, he once again played for the Blue Bulls U19 side in the Under-19 Provincial Championship.

=== Blue Bulls / Varsity Cup ===
At the start of 2008, McDonald represented the Tshwane University of Technology's rugby side, the TUT Vikings in the newly-formed 2008 Varsity Cup competition, making six appearances. He also made his first class debut, playing off the bench in the Blue Bulls' 2008 Vodacom Cup match against Western Province before reverting to Under-21 level for the Blue Bulls during the 2008 Under-21 Provincial Championship.

McDonald switched from the TUT Vikings to UP Tuks for the 2009 Varsity Cup, but failed to make any appearances for the side. He once again played for the Blue Bulls U21 side during the 2009 Under-21 Provincial Championship.

In 2010, McDonald made the move across the Jukskei River to join Johannesburg-based university side UJ. He played Varsity Cup rugby for them during the 2010, 2011 and 2012 seasons, scoring eight tries in 22 appearances over the three seasons, but failed to break into the Golden Lions team.

=== Griffons ===
He returned to provincial action in 2013, almost five years after his only previous first class appearance for the Blue Bulls, when he moved to Welkom-based outfit Griffons. He immediately established himself as a regular in the Griffons side, starting all seven of their matches during the 2013 Vodacom Cup competition and scoring tries in their matches against the Limpopo Blue Bulls, Leopards XV and against his former side, the Blue Bulls in Pretoria in an 89–10 defeat.

He appeared in the Currie Cup competition for the first time during the 2013 Currie Cup First Division competition, making eight appearances as the Griffons finished the season in sixth position. He made two appearances in both the 2014 Vodacom Cup and the 2014 Currie Cup qualification competition before re-establishing himself in the first team during the 2014 Currie Cup First Division competition. He scored tries in consecutive games against the Border Bulldogs and against the league leaders, the Leopards to help the Griffons reach the semi-final of the competition. He started the semi-final as the Griffons beat the SWD Eagles 45–43 in Welkom and was once again in the starting line-up for the final against the Falcons. He played the full 80 minutes of the match as the Griffons ran out 23–21 winners to win their first silverware for six years.

Shortly after the conclusion of the 2014 Currie Cup First Division, McDonald was also included in the Cheetahs' wider training squad as part of their preparations for the 2015 Super Rugby season.
