= Franco Mostert =

South Africa international rugby union player

- Full name: Franco John Mostert
- Born: 27 November 1990 (age 35) Welkom, South Africa
- Height: 2 m (6 ft 6 1/2 in)
- Weight: 112 kg (17 st 9 lb; 247 lb)
- School: Brits High School
- University: University of Pretoria
- Notable relative: JP Mostert

Rugby union career
- Position: Lock / Flanker
- Current team: Honda Heat
Youth career
- 2010–2011: Blue Bulls
Amateur team(s)
Years	Team	Apps	(Points)
2010–2012	UP Tuks	17	(20)
Senior career
Years	Team	Apps	(Points)
2012	Blue Bulls	11	(10)
2013	Golden Lions XV	3	(0)
2014–2018	Lions	83	(20)
2014–2015	Golden Lions	25	(30)
2016–2018	Ricoh Black Rams	16	(10)
2018–2020	Gloucester	29	(0)
2020–present	Honda Heat	82	(60)
- Correct as of 9 May 2026
International career
Years	Team	Apps	(Points)
2016–present	South Africa	87	(20)
- Correct as of 13 November 2026
Medal record
Men's Rugby union
Representing South Africa
Rugby World Cup
Gold medal – first place	2019 Japan	Squad
Gold medal – first place	2023 France	Squad

Franco John Mostert (born 27 November 1990) is a South African professional rugby union player who currently plays for Honda Heat and the South Africa national team. (Note: French Top 14 side Lyon also announced that they signed Mostert from 1 November 2016 onwards (or after the November internationals if he is involved). However, the Ricoh Black Rams then announced that they signed Mostert on a two-year contract, and South African media reported that he will return for the Lions in 2017. In October 2016, with Mostert joining Ricoh Black Rams, Lyon threatened to take legal action against Mostert.) His usual position is lock, but he has often played as a flanker. He was one of the members of the winning Springboks in the 2019 Rugby World Cup in Japan as well as the 2023 Rugby World Cup in France.

He joined the Golden Lions for the 2013 season, but was seriously injured in a car crash shortly after joining, which ruled him out until at least the end of 2013. He fully recovered and was included in the Lions squad for the 2014 Super Rugby season and made his debut in a 21–20 victory over the Cheetahs in Bloemfontein.

He also played for UP Tuks in the 2010, 2011 and 2012 Varsity Cup competitions.

He joined Gloucester prior to the 2018–19 English Premiership.

Mostert was named in South Africa's squad for the 2019 Rugby World Cup. South Africa went on to win the tournament, defeating England in the final.

It was confirmed he had left Gloucester in June 2020 in order to pursue a career in Japan. It was later confirmed that Mostert returned to Japan Top League competition to sign for Honda Heat for their next season.

== Honours ==
South Africa

- 2025 Rugby Championship winner
- 2023 Rugby World Cup winner
- 2019 Rugby World Cup winner
- 2019 Rugby Championship winner

== Statistics ==
=== Test Match Record ===
As of 13 November 2026

Against	P	W	D	L	Tri	Pts	%Won
Argentina	8	7	0	1	0	0	87.5
Australia	11	3	1	7	1	5	27.27
British & Irish Lions	3	2	0	1	0	0	66.67
Canada	1	1	0	0	0	0	100
England	8	5	0	3	0	0	62.5
France	8	6	0	2	0	0	75
Georgia	1	1	0	0	0	0	100
Ireland	7	3	0	4	1	5	42.86
Italy	7	6	0	1	1	5	85.71
Japan	3	3	0	0	0	0	100
Namibia	1	1	0	0	0	0	100
New Zealand	14	5	1	8	0	0	35.71
Scotland	4	4	0	0	0	0	100
Tonga	1	1	0	0	0	0	100
Wales	10	8	0	2	1	5	80
Total	87	56	2	29	4	20	64.37

Pld = Games Played, W = Games Won, D = Games Drawn, L = Games Lost, Tri = Tries Scored, Pts = Points Scored

=== International Tries ===
Try	Opposing team	Location	Venue	Competition	Date	Result	Score
1	Italy	Padua, Italy	Stadio Euganeo	2017 end-of-year tests	25 November 2017	Win	6–35
2	Australia	Sydney, Australia	Sydney Football Stadium	2022 Rugby Championship	3 September 2022	Win	8–24
3	Ireland	Dublin, Ireland	Aviva Stadium	2022 end-of-year tests	5 November 2022	Loss	19–16
4	Wales	Cardiff, Wales	Millennium Stadium	2024 end-of-year tests	23 November 2024	Win	12–45
