= Nollis Marais =

South African rugby union player & coach

Rugby union career
Amateur team(s)
Years	Team	Apps	(Points)
- Adelaar
1998–2003	Naka Bulls		
- Correct as of 2 October 2015
Coaching career
- Years: Team
- 2004–2005: Naka Bulls
- 2003–2010: Hoërskool Overkruin
- 2010–2013: UP Tuks
- 2011–2014: Blue Bulls U21
- 2013–2015: Blue Bulls (Vodacom Cup)
- 2015–2017: Blue Bulls (Currie Cup)
- 2016–2017: Bulls

Nollis Marais is a South African professional rugby union coach of Pretoria-based side the Blue Bulls XV and formerly head coach of their associated Super Rugby franchise, the Bulls.

== Career ==
Marais played club rugby in the Blue Bulls' Carlton League, where he played for Adelaar and for Naka Bulls. He played for and captained Naka Bulls from their formation in 1998 until 2003, when he took over as assistant coach to Cassie Prinsloo.

In 2005, Marais was also appointed as the head coach of Hoërskool Overkruin, guiding them to the Beeld Trophy for medium-sized schools in his first season in charge.

Marais worked as a senior logistics planner, but quit this role in 2007 to take up coaching on a full-time basis.

In 2010, Marais was appointed as the coach of university side UP Tuks. He won the Carlton League with them to help them qualify for the National Club Championship. He guided UP Tuks all the way to the final of the 2011 Varsity Cup, where they lost 16–26 to the UCT Ikey Tigers.

Shortly after the 2011 Varsity Cup season, Marais took up a coaching role with the Blue Bulls, taking over as head coach of the Blue Bulls U21 side. Under his tutelage, the side won the 2011 Under-21 Provincial Championship, beating the Sharks U21s 46–30 in the final.

Marais remained as the UP Tuks coach for the 2012 Varsity Cup and helped them win the competition for the first time, beating three-time winners Maties by winning 29–21 in the final. He once again guided the Blue Bulls U21 side to the 2012 Under-21 Provincial Championship title after they beat Western Province U21 22–13 in the final.

Marais helped UP Tuks retain the Varsity Cup in 2013, this time beating Maties comprehensively in the final, running out 44–5 winners. That was Marais' final Varsity Cup campaign in charge of UP Tuks, with former Griquas coach Pote Human taking over as their new coach for the 2014 Varsity Cup. Marais took charge of the Blue Bulls' Vodacom Cup team and took them to the Quarter Finals in the 2013 competition, where they lost to the Eastern Province Kings.

Marais led the Blue Bulls U21s to their third consecutive final in the 2013 Under-21 Provincial Championship, but fell short on this occasion, losing 23–30 in the final to Western Province U21.

His Blue Bulls side reached the semi-final of the 2014 Vodacom Cup tournament, where they lost 15–16 to trans-Jukskei rivals, the Golden Lions.

Marais won the Under-21 Provincial Championship for the third time in four years in 2014, beating Western Province U21 20–10 in the final in Cape Town.

Marais guided Blue Bulls to their third consecutive quarter final appearance in the 2015 Vodacom Cup, this time reaching the semi-final where they lost 6–10 to Western Province. Following the departure of Bulls head coach Frans Ludeke in June 2015, Marais was appointed as the head coach of the Blue Bulls' 2015 Currie Cup Premier Division campaign.

Shortly before the end of the 2015 Currie Cup campaign, it was announced that Marais would also take over as the head coach of the Bulls prior to the 2016 Super Rugby season, signing a four-year contract.
