= Sabelo Nhlapo =

South African rugby union player

- Born: 17 December 1988 (age 37) Johannesburg, South Africa
- Height: 1.90 m (6 ft 3 in)
- Weight: 116 kg (18 st 4 lb; 256 lb)
- School: Highlands North Boys' High, Johannesburg

Rugby union career
- Position(s): Prop, Lock, Loose forward
Youth career
- 2006: Golden Lions
- 2007–2009: Sharks
Amateur team(s)
Years	Team	Apps	(Points)
2012–2013	UP Tuks	14	(5)
Senior career
Years	Team	Apps	(Points)
2009–2011	Sharks XV	20	(0)
2013	Boland Cavaliers	8	(0)
2014–2016	Pumas	13	(0)
2009–2016	Total	41	(0)
- Correct as of 24 July 2016
International career
Years	Team	Apps	(Points)
2006	South Africa Under-18		
2007	South Africa Under-19		
2008	South Africa Under-20		
- Correct as of 1 October 2013

Sabelo Nhlapo (born 17 December 1988 in Johannesburg) is a retired South African rugby union player, who most recently played with the Pumas. His regular position is prop.

== Career ==
=== Youth ===
Nhlapo represented Johannesburg-based side Golden Lions at the Under-18 Academy Week tournament in 2006, which led to his inclusion in the CAR Under-18 tournament that year.

He then joined the Sharks Academy, where he played at Under-19 level in 2007 and at Under-21 level in 2008 and 2009. Once again, he received representative honours during this time, playing for the South African Under-19 side at the 2007 Under 19 Rugby World Championship and for their U20 side at the 2008 IRB Junior World Championship.

=== Sharks ===
He made his first class debut for the Sharks XV during the 2009 Vodacom Cup competition, in their first round match against the Boland Cavaliers. He made twenty appearances for them in the Vodacom Cup competition over the next three seasons, but failed to break into their Currie Cup side, despite being named in their squad which won the 2010 Currie Cup Premier Division title and also being included in the Sharks Super Rugby squad for the 2011 Super 15 season.

=== Varsity Cup ===
In 2012, he returned to Gauteng to join Pretoria-based Varsity Cup side UP Tuks and made fourteen appearances for them during the 2012 and 2013 seasons. UP Tuks won the competition in both occasions, with Nhlapo playing in both finals.

=== Boland Cavaliers ===
The latter half of 2013 saw him move to Wellington to join the Boland Cavaliers for the 2013 Currie Cup First Division competition. He made seven appearances for them during that competition.

=== Pumas ===
He then moved to Nelspruit to join the Pumas for 2014. He was a member of the Pumas side that won the Vodacom Cup for the first time in 2015, beating Western Province 24–7 in the final. Nhlapo made four appearances during the season.
