= Demetri Catrakilis =

South African rugby union player

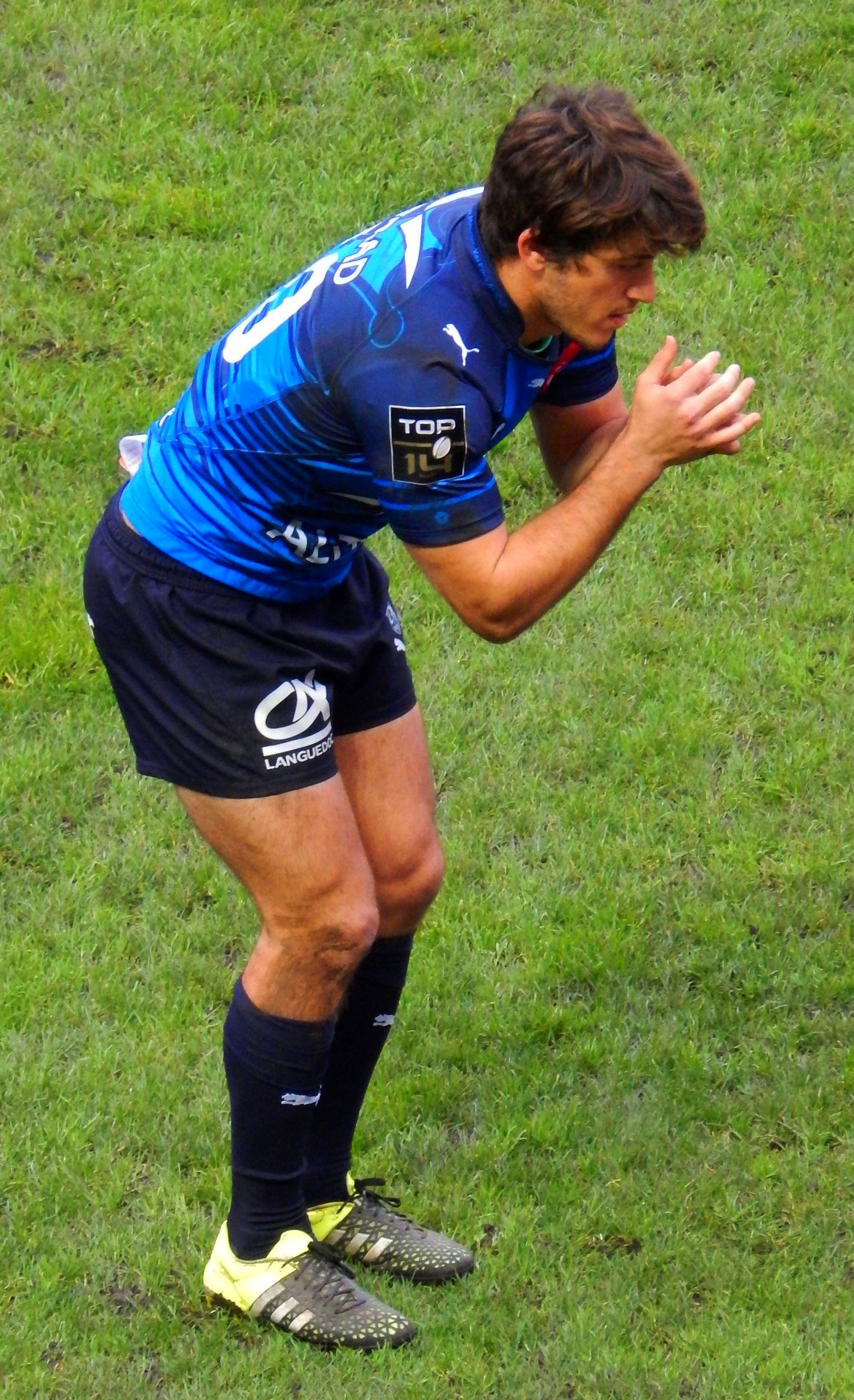
- Catrakilis in December 2015
- Born: 6 July 1989 (age 37) Johannesburg, South Africa
- Height: 1.78 m (5 ft 10 in)
- Weight: 87 kg (192 lb; 13 st 10 lb)
- School: St John's College, Johannesburg
- University: University of Cape Town; University of Johannesburg

Rugby union career
- Position: Fly-Half
Youth career
- 2006–2008: Golden Lions
- 2009–2010: Racing Métro 92
Amateur team(s)
Years	Team	Apps	(Points)
2011	UCT Ikey Tigers	9	(136)
Senior career
Years	Team	Apps	(Points)
2011–2012	Western Province	34	(425)
2013	Southern Kings	15	(151)
2013–2015	Western Province	24	(245)
2014–2015	Stormers	24	(214)
2015–2017	Montpellier	43	(395)
2017–2019	Harlequins	12	(58)
2019–2021	Southern Kings	4	(24)
- Correct as of 12 June 2019

Demetri Catrakilis (Greek: Δημήτρης Κατρακίλης, born on 6 July 1989) is a South African former professional rugby union player. He played for Premiership side Harlequins, Top 14 side Montpellier, for the Stormers and the Southern Kings in Super Rugby and Pro 14, for Western Province in the Currie Cup and Vodacom Cup competitions and for the UCT Ikey Tigers in the Varsity Cup. His regular playing position was fly-half.

== Early career ==
=== Education ===
Catrakilis attended St John's College in Johannesburg where he played in the first team from the age of fifteen, and went on to captain the team in his final school year.

=== Golden Lions ===
Catrakilis represented the Golden Lions Under-18 team in the 2007 Academy Week as their first-choice fly half. He was then chosen to represent the Golden Lions U19 team for the 2008 Under-19 Provincial Championship. He helped the Golden Lions reach the semi-finals of the competition, where they lost 25–28 to the Sharks U19.

=== Racing Métro 92 ===
Following Catrakilis' Under-19 Provincial Championship season with the Golden Lions, he then joined the youth team of French Top 14 side Racing Métro 92, where he enjoyed a brief stint with the Under-23 squad in 2009, before returning home to South Africa.

=== Varsity Cup ===
Catrakilis played for the UCT Ikey Tigers during the 2011 Varsity Cup after a season for Western Province Super League club False Bay. He was the highest point scorer of the tournament with 136 points in his debut Varsity Cup season, helping the Ikey Tigers to win their first Varsity Cup. They beat UP Tuks 26–16 in the final with Catrakilis picking up the Man of the Match award.

== Professional career ==
=== 2011 : Western Province ===
After the successful Varsity Cup, Catrakilis was drafted into the Western Province Vodacom Cup team for their quarter-final loss to the Sharks XV in 2011 Vodacom Cup.

Catrakilis got his chance to play in the first week of the 2011 Currie Cup Premier Division season against the Griquas and came off the substitutes' bench in the last minute to make his Currie Cup debut. Due to injures in the fly-halves position at Western Province, Catrakilis was chosen to start the following week against the Leopards in Potchefstroom. He marked his starting debut by scoring 22 points as Western Province won the match 47–9. He remained as the starting fly-half throughout the season of Western Province's Currie Cup season.

Catrakilis won the ABSA Currie Cup Player of the Month for August and also delivered a Man of the Match performance against the then-unbeaten and eventual champions Golden Lions in a 28–26 win in Round Six of the competition with a 100% kicking success rate and a drop goal. He eventually scored a total of 150 points with the boot and helped Western Province reach the semi-finals. His performances saw him awarded the Western Province Club's Player of the Year.

=== 2012 : Western Province ===
After being left out of the squad for the Stormers in Super Rugby, he continued his career in the 2012 Vodacom Cup with Western Province, helping them win the tournament and going through the season unbeaten. Catrakilis finished second on the top-point scorer's list with 127 points in the competition and also scoring the winning conversion in the final against the Griquas. In November 2012, he was awarded with the Vodacom Cup player of the year award for his successful campaign.

After the Vodacom Cup, Catrakilis was retained as the first-choice fly-half for Western Province for their 2012 Currie Cup Premier Division campaign. He had a starring role in the final against the Sharks at Kings Park, where he kicked three penalties and slotted two drop kicks – one with each foot – in the final quarter of the game, to help Western Province to win the match 25–18 to win their first Currie Cup title since 2001. He accumulated a total 136 points during the 2012 season.

=== 2013 : Southern Kings ===
In August 2012, it was announced that he would join the Southern Kings prior to the 2013 season on a two-year deal. He was subsequently named in the Kings' squad for the 2013 Super Rugby season and made his Super Rugby debut for them on 23 February 2013, when the Southern Kings played their first ever match in the Super Rugby competition against the Force in Port Elizabeth. Catrakilis scored four penalties in the Kings' historical 22–10 victory over the Force.

Catrakilis remained the first choice fly-half for the Kings for the duration of the 2013 Super Rugby season, making fourteen appearances in the competition and scoring 37 penalties, 14 conversions and a drop goal to finish with a tally of 142 points. He also started the first leg of the 2013 Super Rugby Promotion/relegation play-offs against the Lions, scoring three penalties.

Catrakilis was largely responsible for helping the Kings to two away victories in their maiden season. On 5 April 2013, he was struggling with an injury and demoted to the bench for their match against the Brumbies in Canberra, but came on as a substitute in the 76th minute of the match. A try from number eight Cornell du Preez three minutes into injury time pulled the score back to 28–26 to the Brumbies and Catrakilis converted the subsequent conversion to secure a 28–28 draw.

Their very next match also ended in dramatic fashion when a Wimpie van der Walt try and subsequent Catrakilis conversion from the corner tied the scores at 27–27 in the Kings' match against the Rebels in Melbourne. However, three minutes into injury time, Catrakilis scored a drop goal for the Kings to clinch the match 30–27 and secure their first ever victory on foreign soil in their first Super Rugby season.

Catrakilis also scored four conversions and two penalties in the Kings' 34–27 victory over the Highlanders in Port Elizabeth. This was the only time the Kings achieved a bonus point win during the 2013 season.

=== 2013 : Return to Western Province ===
After the Southern Kings lost their Super Rugby status in the 2013 Super Rugby Promotion/relegation play-offs against the Lions, Catrakilis returned to Western Province, signing a two-year deal with the Cape Town team. Despite being injured for the opening rounds of the 2013 Currie Cup Premier Division, he returned to Western Province squad for their match against Griquas. He played off the bench in the match against Griquas, as well as against the Free State Cheetahs the following week, where he scored a match-winning drop goal in a 29–27 victory. He returned to the starting line-up for the Western Province for the remaining two matches of the regular season to guide his team to the 2013 Currie Cup Premier Division semi-finals. He scored a try and kicked 17 points in their 33–16 victory over the Golden Lions in the semi-final, but ended up on the losing side in the final – the first in Cape Town since 2001 – as the Sharks ran out 33–19 winners.

=== 2014 : Stormers ===
In 2014, Catrakilis was selected for in the Stormers squad for the 2014 Super Rugby season. He made his debut in the away loss to the Lions at Ellis Park in the Stormers opening match of the tournament. The Stormers then hosted the Hurricanes at Newlands, where Catrakilis kicked the winning conversion in the final moments of the match in a 19–18 win. He made appearances in the remainder of the competition and, although a nose break ruled him out for a number of weeks, he finished the competition with 44 points.

=== 2014 : Western Province ===
Catrakilis was handed the number 10 jersey at the start of the 2014 Currie Cup Premier Division competition and he helped Western Province to victories in all ten matches that he started. Western Province finished the regular season of the competition at the top of the log, securing home advantage in both the semi-final and the final, with Catrakilis contributing a personal points tally of 39 points. Western Province reached the 2014 Currie Cup final after a 31–23 win over the Blue Bulls in a semi-final at Newlands, with Catrakilis contributing 16 points from the kicking tee. Jaco Taute scored Western Province's only try of the match, with Catrakilis converting the try and kicking four penalties as Western Province won the match 19–16 to win the 2014 Currie Cup, their second Currie Cup title in three years. Catrakilis' performance was awarded with the ABSA Man of the Match award. He ended the campaign as the joint-top point scorer alongside the Blue Bulls' Jacques-Louis Potgieter with 123 points.

=== 2015 : Stormers ===
The Stormers built on Western Province's Currie Cup success by finishing the 2015 Super Rugby season as South African Conference Winners. They were eliminated in the playoffs following a 19–39 loss to the Brumbies at Newlands. Catrakilis finished the season as the top South African points scorer with 170 points, converting 62 of his 71 attempts at goal to finish with an 87% success rate.

=== 2015 : Western Province ===
Catrakilis started the first four of Western Province's matches in the 2015 Currie Cup Premier Division and made a further three appearances off the bench – scoring 53 points in his seven appearances – before being released by Western Province to take up a contract with Montpellier.

=== 2015–2017 : Montpellier ===
In January 2015, Catrakilis signed a contract to join French Top 14 side Montpellier to link up with former South African World Cup winning head coach Jake White.

In Catrakilis's first season with Montpellier, he won the 2015–16 European Rugby Challenge Cup with a 26–19 victory over Harlequins. He also finished as the competition's Top Point scorer with a total of 79 points. Montpellier then went on to finish third in the Top 14 season, however they lost to Toulon in the semi-finals with a score of 27–18.

The following season saw Montpellier finish in third place once again in the Top 14, however their season ended with a 13–22 loss to Racing 92 in the quarter-finals of the competition.

=== 2017 : Harlequins ===
Catrakilis made the move to England to join Premiership side Harlequins prior to the 2017–2018 season. He missed a large part of his first season at Harlequins after suffering a life-threatening injury where he broke a bone in his throat. After a lengthy lay off, he made a full recovery and returned to the playing field.

=== 2019–present : Return to Southern Kings ===
In May 2019, it was announced that Catrakilis would return to the Southern Kings. He signed a one-year loan deal for the 2019–20 season from the Harlequins, with an option to extend to a second season.

== International career ==
On 22 May 2013, Catrakilis was selected for a Springboks training camp prior to a Quadrangular test series featuring Italy, Scotland and Samoa. Subsequently, Catrakilis was also included in a Springbok training camp leading up to the 2015 Rugby World Cup.

== Honours and records ==
=== UCT Ikey Tigers ===
- 2011 Varsity Cup: winner
- 2011 Varsity Cup: Top points scorer
- 2011 Varsity Cup Final: Man of the Match

=== Western Province ===
- 2011 Currie Cup Premier Division: August Player of the Month
- 2011: Western Province Club's Player of the Year.
- 2012 Vodacom Cup: winner
- 2012 Vodacom Cup: Player of the Year
- 2012 Currie Cup Premier Division: winner
- 2014 Currie Cup Premier Division: winner
- 2014 Currie Cup Final: Man of the Match
- 2014 Currie Cup: Joint top points scorer

=== Kings ===
After the 2013 Super Rugby season, Catrakilis held the following records for the franchise:

- Most points in a match: 15 (achieved twice – vs Rebels and Cheetahs)
- Most conversions in a match: 4 (vs Highlanders)
- Most penalties in a match: 5 (vs Cheetahs)
- Most drop goals in a match: 1 (vs Rebels)
- Most points in a season: 142
- Most conversions in a season: 14
- Most penalties in a season: 37
- Most drop goals in a season: 1

=== Stormers ===
- 2015 Super Rugby season: Joint all-time record holder for most consecutive successful goal attempts – 28
- 2015 Super Rugby season: South African Conference winners
- 2015 Super Rugby: Top South African points scorer

=== Montpellier ===
- 2015–16 European Rugby Challenge Cup : winner.
- 2015–16 European Rugby Challenge Cup : Top Point Scorer.
- 2016-17 Top 14 : Player of the week.
- 2016-17 Top 14 : Team of the month.

== Statistics ==
As of 6 August 2015

First class career
Season	Teams	Super Rugby		Currie Cup		Vodacom Cup		Other		Total	
Season	Teams	Apps	Pts	Apps	Pts	Apps	Pts	Apps	Pts	Apps	Pts
2011	Western Province	—	—	11	150	1	9	1	3	13	162
2012	Western Province	—	—	11	136	10	127	—	—	21	263
2013	Southern Kings / Western Province	14	142	6	69	—	—	1	9	21	220
2014	Stormers / Western Province	8	44	11	123	—	—	—	—	19	167
2015	Stormers / Western Province	16	170	7	53	—	—	—	—	23	223
Total		38	356	46	531	11	136	2	12	97	1035

== Soccer ==
Catrakilis was also a talented footballer at youth level; in 2005, he was selected for an Invitational South Africa team that played in the Brazil Cup. He also spent 2007 with South African Premier Soccer League team Moroka Swallows before choosing to pursue a career in rugby union rather than football.

A video which became a hit with the rugby and football public was released by the Stormers which displayed Catrakilis mixing his Football and Rugby skills.
