= Chris Rossouw =

Chris Rossouw may refer to:

- Chris Rossouw (rugby union born 1976), South Africa rugby union fly-half
- Chris Rossouw (rugby union born 1969), South African rugby union hooker
