= Willie Britz =

South African rugby union player

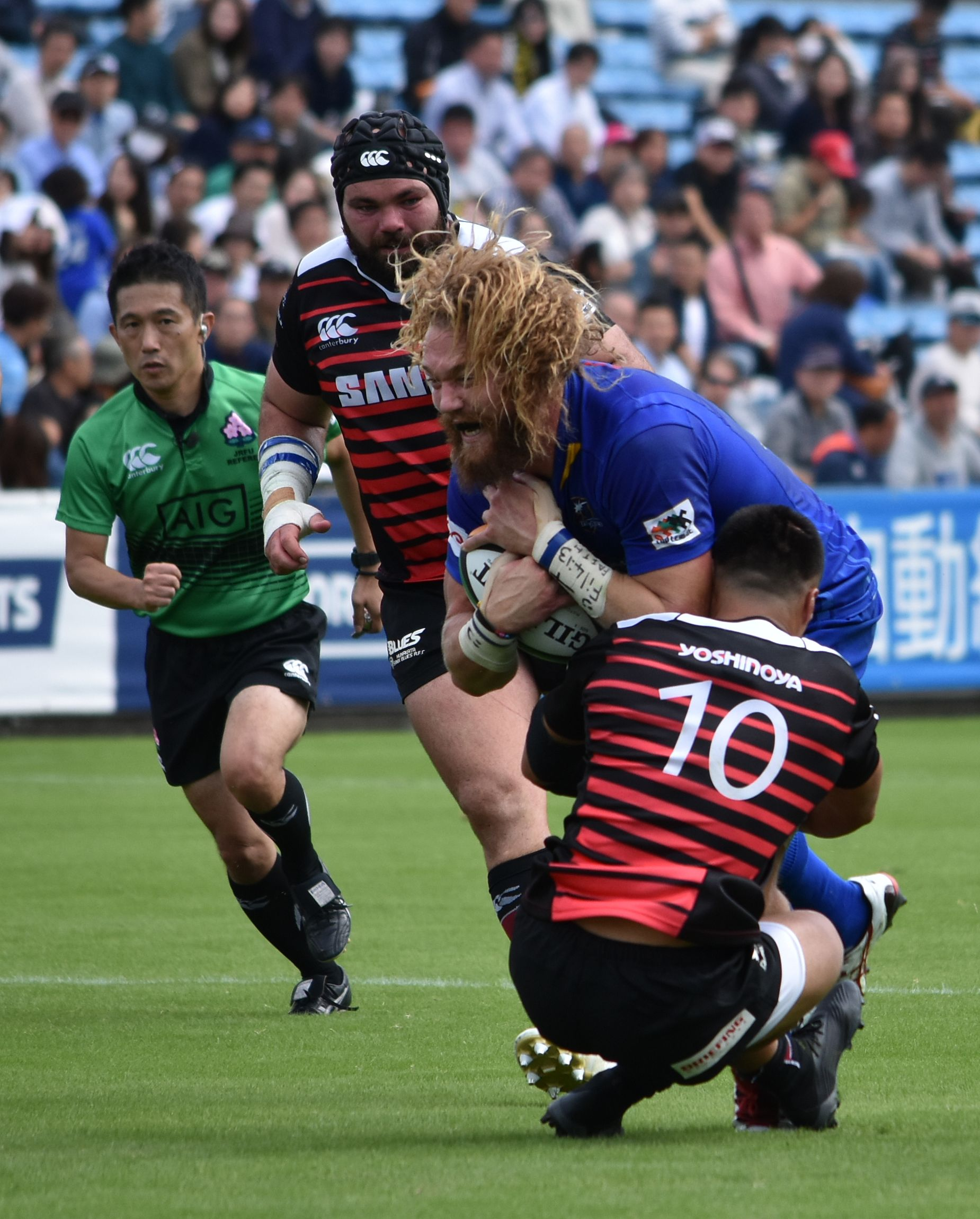
- Full name: Willem Stephanus Britz
- Born: 31 August 1988 (age 38) Cape Town, South Africa
- Height: 1.93 m (6 ft 4 in)
- Weight: 106 kg (16 st 10 lb; 234 lb)
- School: Diamantveld High School, Kimberley
- University: University of the Free State
- Occupation(s): Ex-Professional Rugby Player & Entrepreneur

Rugby union career
- Position(s): lock, Flanker, Number eight
Youth career
- 2005–2006: Griquas
- 2007–2008: Free State Cheetahs
Amateur team(s)
Years	Team	Apps	(Points)
2008–2012	UFS Shimlas	25	(35)
Senior career
Years	Team	Apps	(Points)
2009	Free State Cheetahs	1	(0)
2010–2012	Griffons	28	(40)
2011	Emerging Cheetahs	1	(0)
2011	Free State Cheetahs	4	(10)
2012–2014	Golden Lions	32	(20)
2013	Golden Lions XV	7	(5)
2013–2014	Lions	15	(0)
2015–2016	Cheetahs	12	(0)
2015–2021	NTT Communications Shining Arcs	53	(65)
2016	Free State XV	1	(0)
2017–2018	Sunwolves	22	(15)
2022–2023	Houston SaberCats	7	(10)
2022–2023	NTT DoCoMo Red Hurricanes	9	(15)
- Correct as of 28 February 2022
International career
Years	Team	Apps	(Points)
2017	Barbarians	2	(0)

Willem Stephanus "Willie" Britz (born 31 August 1988) is a South African former professional rugby union player. He played as a flanker, number eight, and lock. Britz had an extensive career across South Africa, Japan, and the United States, and was known for his athleticism, versatility, and leadership on the field.

== Early life ==
Britz was born in Cape Town, South Africa. He attended Diamantveld High School in Kimberley, where he represented the Griquas (rugby union) at youth level, including appearances at the Under-18 Craven Week tournaments in 2005 and 2006. He also played in the Under-19 Currie Cup competition in 2006 before moving to the Free State Cheetahs. He later enrolled at the University of the Free State, where he represented the university team, the UFS Shimlas, in the Varsity Cup from 2008 to 2012.

== Career ==
=== South Africa ===
Britz began his professional career with the Free State Cheetahs in the 2009 Vodacom Cup, making his debut in a match against the Mighty Elephants.

He moved to the Griffons in 2010 and became a regular over the next three seasons. During this time, he also played four more matches for the Cheetahs in the 2011 Vodacom Cup. In parallel, he represented the UFS Shimlas in the Varsity Cup from 2008 to 2012.

In mid-2012, Britz joined the Golden Lions ahead of the 2012 Currie Cup Premier Division, making his debut in their opening match against his former team, the Cheetahs.

In 2013, he featured in both legs of the Lions' promotion/relegation play-offs following the 2013 Super Rugby season, which resulted in the Lions regaining their Super Rugby status.

He was subsequently named in the Lions’ squad for the 2014 Super Rugby season, and made his Super Rugby debut in a 21–20 victory over the Cheetahs in Bloemfontein.

Britz later returned to the Cheetahs, joining them for the 2015 Super Rugby season and continuing into 2016 Super Rugby season before moving abroad to join the Sunwolves in 2017.

=== Japan ===
From 2015 to 2021, Britz played for the NTT Communications Shining Arcs in Japan's Top League, making 46 appearances and scoring 30 points. He was also a key player for the Sunwolves in Super Rugby between 2016 and 2018, serving as team captain during the 2018 season.

Later in 2022, Britz joined the NTT DoCoMo Red Hurricanes Osaka in Division 3 of Japan Rugby League One. He played 9 matches in the 2022–2023 season, helping the team win the division and secure promotion to Division 2.

=== Major League Rugby ===
In 2022, Britz signed with the Houston SaberCats in the United States’ Major League Rugby competition.

=== Representative Rugby ===
In 2017, Britz was selected to represent the Barbarians in two high-profile international fixtures during their European tour.

He started at number eight in the Barbarians' 27–24 victory over Tonga on 10 November 2017 at Thomond Park in Limerick, as part of the "Tonga in Europe" series.

Earlier that month, on 5 November 2017, Britz featured off the bench wearing jersey 19 in the Barbarians’ 22–31 defeat to the All Blacks at Twickenham Stadium in the 2017 Killik Cup fixture.

== Retirement ==
Britz officially announced his retirement from professional rugby in April 2023, marking the end of a 14-year playing career. In interviews and social media, he expressed gratitude for his rugby journey and credited his faith as a sustaining force throughout his career.

== Playing style ==
Britz was known for his dynamic ball-carrying, lineout strength, and positional flexibility. He was effective as a linking forward in open play and often contributed as a leader on and off the field.

== Career statistics ==
Years	Team	Apps	Points
2009	Free State Cheetahs	1	0
2010–2012	Griffons / Cheetahs	28	40
2012–2014	Golden Lions / Lions	32	20
2013	Cheetahs (Super Rugby)	7	5
2015–2016	Cheetahs (Super Rugby)	12	0
2015–2021	NTT Communications Shining Arcs	46	30
2017	Barbarians	2	0
2017–2018	Sunwolves	22	15
2017–2018	World 15		
2022-2023	Houston SaberCats	10	7
2022–2023	Red Hurricanes Osaka	9	0

== Personal life ==
Britz has publicly credited his Christian faith as foundational to his rugby career. After retiring from professional rugby, he turned his focus to entrepreneurial ventures.
