= Wesley Dunlop =

South African rugby union player

- Full name: Wesley Roy Dunlop
- Born: 12 May 1987 (age 39) Durban, South Africa
- Height: 1.83 m (6 ft 0 in)
- Weight: 89 kg (196 lb; 14 st 0 lb)
- School: Grey High School
- University: University of Pretoria

Rugby union career
- Position: Fly-half
- Current team: US Montauban
Youth career
- 2006: Eastern Province Kings
- 2007–2008: Sharks
Amateur team(s)
Years	Team	Apps	(Points)
2011–2012	UP Tuks	16	(165)
Senior career
Years	Team	Apps	(Points)
2009	Mighty Elephants	8	(43)
2011–2012	Blue Bulls	8	(52)
2011	→ Leopards	12	(82)
2012–2013	Eastern Province Kings	27	(189)
2013	Southern Kings	0	(0)
2013–present	US Montauban	35	(410)
- Correct as of 17 February 2015

Wesley Roy Dunlop (born 12 May 1987) is a South African rugby union player, currently playing with US Montauban.

== Career ==
=== Youth ===
He attended Grey High School in Port Elizabeth and played for the Eastern Province Under-19 team and the NMMU Madibaz in club rugby.

=== Natal Sharks ===
In 2007, he moved to Durban, where he joined the Sharks academy. He played for the Sharks XV at the Under-21 level and was included in their Vodacom Cup squads in 2009 and 2010. During the 2009 Currie Cup First Division, he made 7 appearances for the Mighty Elephants (now the Eastern Province Kings). In 2010, he was a member of the College Rovers club that won the National Club Championships.

=== Blue Bulls ===
In 2011, he then moved to the Blue Bulls. He made several appearances for their Vodacom Cup team in 2011 and 2012. During the same period, he also played for the Varsity Cup side UP Tuks. He had a fantastic season in 2012, finishing as the top scorer and being voted the Player That Rocks.

=== Eastern Province Kings ===
In 2012, he then moved back to Port Elizabeth for his second spell with the Eastern Province Kings. He made his debut on 30 July 2012 in the opening game of the 2012 Currie Cup First Division season against Boland Cavaliers, scoring five points in a 25–20 victory.

He was initially named in the Southern Kings squad for the 2013 Super Rugby season, but was later released to the 2013 Vodacom Cup squad.

=== Montauban ===
In 2013, he joined US Montauban in the French 3rd Division.
