= Stompie de Wet =

South African rugby union player

- Full name: Philip Albert de Wet
- Born: 14 February 1989 (age 37) Kuruman, South Africa
- Height: 1.86 m (6 ft 1 in)
- Weight: 105 kg (16 st 7 lb; 231 lb)
- School: Grey College, Bloemfontein
- University: North-West University

Rugby union career
- Position: Flanker
Youth career
- 2005: Free State Cheetahs
- 2009–2010: Leopards
Amateur team(s)
Years	Team	Apps	(Points)
2011–2014	NWU Pukke	21	(45)
Senior career
Years	Team	Apps	(Points)
2011–2014	Leopards	32	(75)
- Correct as of 19 July 2014

Philip Albert "Stompie" de Wet (born 14 February 1989 in Kuruman, South Africa) is a former South African rugby union player, that played first class rugby with the Leopards from 2011 to 2014. His regular position was flanker.

== Career ==
=== Youth and Varsity Cup rugby ===
While playing school rugby for Grey College in Bloemfontein, De Wet was selected for the Free State Cheetahs Under-16 side that played at the 2005 Grant Khomo Week.

His next provincial representation only came after he moved to Potchefstroom to join the Leopards. He was part of the Leopards U21 sides that played in the 2009 and 2010 Under-21 Provincial Championships. He also became a regular player for Potchefstroom-based university side the NWU Pukke in the Varsity Cup competition, playing for them in four seasons between 2011 and 2014, making in excess of twenty appearances in the competition and helping them reach their first final for five seasons in 2014, where they lost in dramatic fashion to the UCT Ikey Tigers.

=== Leopards ===
He played first class rugby since 2011. His first ever senior appearance came during the 2011 Vodacom Cup competition; he started their match against Argentinean invitational side the Pampas XV in Potchefstroom. He made two more starts in this competition – against the Sharks XV in Durban and at home against Western Province, which also saw De Wet score his first try at provincial level as he dotted down in the third minute of the game.

He was included in the Leopards' Currie Cup side for the 2011 Currie Cup Premier Division season and made his debut in this competition on 22 July 2011 in their match against Western Province as his side crashed to a 9–47 defeat. His very next game saw De Wet score two tries in their match against the Golden Lions, but it wasn't enough as they lost the match 36–53. The Leopards' only victory of the season came in their next match against the Pumas as they ended the season in last position and were relegated to the 2012 Currie Cup First Division, with De Wet appearing in nine of their matches.

After three more appearances in the 2013 Vodacom Cup, De Wet scored seven tries in just six appearances in the 2012 Currie Cup First Division. He scored four of those in one match, a 53–28 victory over the Border Bulldogs in Potchefstroom. Two tries in eight appearances followed in the 2013 Currie Cup First Division (both those tries coming in their match against the Falcons) and he was also included in their squad for the 2014 Currie Cup qualification tournament.
