= Justin McKay =

American baseball coach

Biographical details
- Born: 1985 or 1986 (age 40–41)

Playing career
- 2004–2007: Briarcliffe College
- 2008: Queens College
- Positions: Outfielder & Pitcher

Coaching career (HC unless noted)
- 2008–2010: Briarcliffe College (asst.)
- 2010–2013: Fairleigh Dickinson (asst.)
- 2014: Montclair State (asst.)
- 2016–2018: Fairleigh Dickinson (asst.)
- 2018–2019: Fairleigh Dickinson (Interim HC)

Head coaching record
- Overall: 15–37–1
- Tournaments: NEC: 9–15; NCAA: 0–0

Accomplishments and honors

Awards
- 2006 USCAA National Champion (player) 2010 USCAA National Champion (asst. coach) (2010) Youngest Recruiting Coordinator NCAA Division I Baseball (age 24) (2014) USA 18u National Team NTIS Task Force Member (2016) Northeast Conference Top Recruiter (2019) Top 5 Youngest Head Coach Baseball - NCAA Division I (age 33)

Justin McKay is an American college baseball coach and former outfielder and pitcher. McKay was the Interim Head Baseball Coach of the NCAA Division I Fairleigh Dickinson Knights baseball team during the 2018-2019 year before retiring after the season.

== Playing career ==
McKay attended American High School in Fremont, California and Shaker High School in Latham, New York. McKay then enrolled at Briarcliffe College, to play college baseball for the nationally ranked Division I NJCAA Briarcliffe College Seahawks baseball team. He served as team captain of the 2006 USCAA National Championship team.

In the summer of 2006, McKay suffered back and ankle injuries limiting his junior season. Following completion of his degree, he transferred to Queens College, City University of New York for his senior year. McKay won the starting centerfield job in spring of 2008 helping the Knights compile the most wins since 2003. Battling injury throughout the season, McKay scored 21 runs, while hitting .320 with a .454 on-base percentage (OBP) and 21 RBIs. Following his collegiate career, McKay played in the New York State League before retiring shortly after due to previous injury.

== Coaching career ==
McKay returned to Briarcliffe College to assist his former head coach Gary Puccio. In the fall of 2010, McKay left Briarcliffe with Puccio to become an assistant at Fairleigh Dickinson. On May 30, 2018, McKay was named the interim head coach at Fairleigh Dickinson. In May of 2019, after a 11 year coaching career and his second child on the way, McKay retired from baseball.

== Head coaching record ==
Record table
Season	Team	Overall	Conference	Standing	Postseason
Fairleigh Dickinson Knights (Northeast Conference) (2019)
2019	Fairleigh Dickinson	15–37–1	9–15	6th	
Fairleigh Dickinson:		15–37–1	9–15		
Total:		15–37–1			
National champion Postseason invitational champion Conference regular season champion Conference regular season and conference tournament champion Division regular season champion Division regular season and conference tournament champion Conference tournament champion
