= 2010 Under-21 Provincial Championship Group A =

- Countries: South Africa
- Date: 3 July – 30 October 2010
- Champions: Western Province U21
- Runners-up: Blue Bulls U21
- Relegated: Boland U21
- Matches played: 45
- Tries scored: 403 (average 9 per match)
- Top point scorer: Gary van Aswegen (207)
- Top try scorer: Danie Poolman (17)

The 2010 Under-21 Provincial Championship Group A was contested from 3 July to 30 October 2010. The tournament (also known as the ABSA Under-21 Provincial Championship for sponsorship reasons) was the top tier of 2010 edition of the Under-21 Provincial Championship, an annual Under-21 inter-provincial rugby union competition featuring fourteen South African provincial unions.

The tournament was won by Western Province U21; they beat Blue Bulls U21 43–32 in the final played on 30 October 2010. Boland U21 were relegated to Group B for 2011.

== Competition rules and information ==
There were seven participating teams in the 2010 Under-21 Provincial Championship Group A. These teams played each other twice over the course of the season, once at home and once away.

Teams received four points for a win and two points for a draw. Bonus points were awarded to teams that scored four or more tries in a game, as well as to teams that lost a match by seven points or less. Teams were ranked by log points, then points difference (points scored less points conceded).

The top four teams qualified for the title play-off semi-finals. The team that finished first had home advantage against the team that finished fourth, while the team that finished second had home advantage against the team that finished third. The final would be played as a curtain raiser for the 2010 Currie Cup Premier Division final.

The team that finished bottom of Group A had to play in a promotion/relegation play-off against the champion of Group B for a place in the 2011 Under-21 Provincial Championship Group A.

== Teams ==
Location of teams in the 2010 Under-21 Provincial Championship Group A

The following teams took part in the 2010 Under-21 Provincial Championship Group A competition:

2010 Under-21 Provincial Championship Group A teams
Team Name	Stadium
Blue Bulls U21	Loftus Versfeld, Pretoria
Boland U21	Boland Stadium, Wellington
Free State U21	Free State Stadium, Bloemfontein
Golden Lions U21	Ellis Park Stadium, Johannesburg
Leopards U21	Olën Park, Potchefstroom
Sharks U21	Kings Park Stadium, Durban
Western Province U21	Newlands Stadium, Cape Town

== Standings ==
The final league standings for the 2010 Under-21 Provincial Championship Group A were:

2010 Under-21 Provincial Championship Group A standings
Pos	Team	P	W	D	L	PF	PA	PD	TF	TA	TB	LB	Pts
1	Western Province U21	12	11	0	1	533	264	+269	69	30	7	0	51
2	Blue Bulls U21	12	9	0	3	474	326	+148	62	33	10	2	48
3	Sharks U21	12	9	0	3	543	274	+269	73	31	9	1	46
4	Free State U21	12	6	0	6	561	366	+195	71	46	7	4	35
5	Leopards U21	12	4	0	8	370	406	−36	45	52	6	3	25
6	Golden Lions U21	12	3	0	9	325	393	−68	43	51	5	1	18
7	Boland U21	12	0	0	12	105	882	−777	13	133	1	0	1

Legend and competition rules
Legend:
Top four teams qualify to the semi-finals.	P = Games played, W = Games won, D = Games drawn, L = Games lost, PF = Points for, PA = Points against, PD = Points difference, TF = Tries For, TA = Tries Against, TB = Try bonus points, LB = Losing bonus points, Pts = Log points
The bottom team qualify to the relegation play-off.	P = Games played, W = Games won, D = Games drawn, L = Games lost, PF = Points for, PA = Points against, PD = Points difference, TF = Tries For, TA = Tries Against, TB = Try bonus points, LB = Losing bonus points, Pts = Log points
Competition rules:
Play-offs: The top four teams qualify to the semi-finals, with the higher-placed team having home advantage. The bottom team qualify to the relegation play-off, having home advantage against the Group B champions. Points breakdown: * 4 points for a win * 2 points for a draw * 1 bonus point for a loss by seven points or less * 1 bonus point for scoring four or more tries in a match

=== Round-by-round ===
The table below shows each team's progression throughout the season. For each round, their cumulative points total is shown with the overall log position in brackets:

Team Progression – 2010 Under-21 Provincial Championship Group A
Team	R1	R2	R3	R4	R5	R6	R7	R8	R9	R10	R11	R12	R13	R14	R15	Semi	Final
Western Province U21	0 (2nd)	5 (4th)	9 (3rd)	13 (1st)	13 (3rd)	18 (2nd)	22 (1st)	22 (3rd)	26 (3rd)	31 (3rd)	36 (2nd)	41 (1st)	41 (3rd)	46 (3rd)	51 (1st)	Won	Won
Blue Bulls U21	5 (1st)	5 (2nd)	9 (2nd)	11 (3rd)	16 (2nd)	21 (1st)	21 (2nd)	26 (1st)	26 (2nd)	31 (2nd)	36 (1st)	41 (2nd)	46 (1st)	48 (1st)	48 (2nd)	Won	Lost
Sharks U21	0 (2nd)	5 (1st)	6 (4th)	6 (4th)	10 (4th)	15 (4th)	20 (3rd)	25 (2nd)	30 (1st)	31 (1st)	31 (3rd)	36 (3rd)	41 (2nd)	46 (2nd)	46 (3rd)	Lost	—
Free State U21	0 (2nd)	2 (5th)	2 (5th)	6 (5th)	7 (5th)	7 (5th)	12 (5th)	16 (5th)	18 (4th)	23 (4th)	25 (4th)	25 (4th)	30 (4th)	35 (4th)	35 (4th)	Lost	—
Leopards U21	0 (2nd)	5 (3rd)	10 (1st)	11 (2nd)	16 (1st)	16 (3rd)	16 (4th)	17 (4th)	17 (5th)	17 (5th)	17 (5th)	17 (5th)	18 (5th)	20 (5th)	25 (5th)	—	—
Golden Lions U21	0 (2nd)	0 (6th)	0 (7th)	5 (6th)	5 (6th)	5 (6th)	5 (6th)	5 (6th)	10 (6th)	11 (6th)	16 (6th)	16 (6th)	17 (6th)	18 (6th)	18 (6th)	—	—
Boland U21	0 (7th)	0 (7th)	1 (6th)	1 (7th)	1 (7th)	1 (7th)	1 (7th)	1 (7th)	1 (7th)	1 (7th)	1 (7th)	1 (7th)	1 (7th)	1 (7th)	1 (7th)	—	—
Key:	win	draw	loss	bye													

== Fixtures ==
The following matches were played in the 2010 Under-21 Provincial Championship Group A:

- All times are South African (GMT+2).

=== Round one ===
3 July 2010	Boland U21	18–43	Blue Bulls U21	Boland Stadium, Wellington
14:00	Try: Francois Geduld 21'; Percival Godfrey Williams 65'; Con: Brynn Michael Gericke 66' (1/2); Pen: Brynn Michael Gericke 4', 39' (2/2)	Scoreboard	Try: Marnus Schoeman 8', 27', 36'; Ernst Dinkelmann 17'; Jono Ross 30'; Whestley Moolman 45'; Peet Vorster 54'; Con: Marnitz Boshoff 9' (1/3); Justin van Staden 31', 37' (2/3); JC Roos 55' (1/1); Cards: Tendayi Chikukwa (yellow card) 78'	Referee: Archie Sehlako

Bye/s: Free State U21, Golden Lions U21, Leopards U21, Sharks U21, Western Province U21

=== Round two ===
9 July 2010	Sharks U21	106–3	Boland U21	Kings Park Stadium, Durban
15:00	Try: Meyer Swanepoel 1', 75'; Willie du Plessis 5'; Cobus Reinach 10', 21', 46', 59'; Mark Richards 25', 77', 80'; Jaco Otto 31', 53'; Rosko Specman 33'; Howard Mnisi 37', 57'; Lambert Groenewald 68'; Con: Willie du Plessis 2', 6', 22', 26', 34', 38', 47', 54', 58', 60', 69', 75', 78' (13/15); Julian Redelinghuys (0/1)	Scoreboard	Pen: Brynn Michael Gericke 17' (1/1); Cards: Gerhardus Goosen (yellow card) 74'

9 July 2010	Leopards U21	36–16	Golden Lions U21	Royal Bafokeng Stadium, Phokeng
17:00	Try: Joubert Engelbrecht 5', 55'; Tiaan Dorfling 21', 64', 74'; Con: Louis Fouché 6', 22' (2/3); SP Marais 65', 75' (2/2); Pen: Louis Fouché 43' (1/3)	Scoreboard	Try: Luan Steenkamp 77'; Con: Justin Botha 78' (1/1); Pen: Justin Botha 11', 33', 45' (3/4); Cards: Luan Steenkamp (yellow card) 32' to 42'	Attendance: 300; Referee: Mlungiseleli Mdashe

10 July 2010	Free State U21	40–42	Western Province U21	Free State Stadium, Bloemfontein
15:00	Try: Hoffmann Maritz 10'; Piet van Zyl 15', 36'; Earl Snyman 45'; Con: George Whitehead 11', 16', 37', 46' (4/4); Pen: George Whitehead 9', 39', 53', 63' (4/7); Drop: George Whitehead (0/1)	Scoreboard	Try: Yaya Hartzenberg 5'; Berton Klaasen 26'; Nick Köster 51'; JJ Engelbrecht 54'; Danie Poolman 68', 76'; Con: Gary van Aswegen 6', 27', 77' (3/6); Pen: Gary van Aswegen 12', 72' (2/3)

Bye/s: Blue Bulls U21

=== Round three ===
16 July 2010	Leopards U21	46–24	Boland U21	Olën Park, Potchefstroom
18:00	Try: Joubert Engelbrecht 14', 33', 42'; SP Marais 17', 74'; Louis Fouché 23'; Juandré Williams 39'; Con: Louis Fouché 15', 18', 24', 40' (4/6); SP Marais (0/1); Pen: Louis Fouché 4' (1/1); Cards: Louis Fouché (yellow card) 60' to 70'	Scoreboard	Try: Donovan Theodore Arendse 10'; Justin Kelvyn Gizzler Morgan 19'; Dual Erasmus 31'; Lee Thomas Becker 61'; Con: Brynn Michael Gericke 32', 62' (2/4); Cards: Lee Thomas Becker (red card) 63'	Attendance: 1,000; Referee: Rasta Rasivhenge

17 July 2010	Western Province U21	33–8	Golden Lions U21	Newlands Stadium, Cape Town
12:50	Try: JJ Engelbrecht 5'; JP Smith 42'; Danie Poolman 56'; Con: Gary van Aswegen 6', 43', 57' (3/3); Pen: Gary van Aswegen 9', 19', 36', 54' (4/4); Cards: Wimpie van der Walt (yellow card) 25' to 35'	Scoreboard	Try: Divan Ferguson 28'; Con: Dewald Nel (0/1); Pen: Dewald Nel 48' (1/1); Cards: Hendrik Daniel la Grange (yellow card) 69' to 79'	Attendance: 5,000; Referee: Ben Crouse

17 July 2010	Sharks U21	16–20	Blue Bulls U21	Kings Park Stadium, Durban
15:00	Try: Meyer Swanepoel 3'; Con: Willie du Plessis 4' (1/1); Pen: Willie du Plessis 25', 32', 39' (3/6)	Scoreboard	Try: Justin van Staden 27'; AJ le Roux 44'; Clayton Blommetjies 58'; Con: Marnitz Boshoff (0/2); Justin van Staden 59' (1/1); Pen: Marnitz Boshoff 68' (1/2); Cards: Jono Ross (yellow card) 9' to 19'	Attendance: 300; Referee: Francois Veldsman

Bye/s: Free State U21

=== Round four ===
23 July 2010	Boland U21	6–40	Golden Lions U21	Boland Stadium, Wellington
16:00	Pen: Brynn Michael Gericke 5', 23' (2/6); Cards: Fyzel Cornell Afrika (yellow card) 64' to 74'	Scoreboard	Try: Jaco Kriel 18', 56'; François Du Toit 31'; Rudy Paige 39'; Heinrich Terblanche 62'; Luan Steenkamp 65'; Con: Dewald Nel 19', 63' (2/5); Justin Botha (0/1); Pen: Dewald Nel 8', 13' (2/2)	Referee: Dilbert November

23 July 2010	Leopards U21	19–20	Western Province U21	Profert Olën Park, Potchefstroom
17:05	Try: Andrew van Wyk 60'; Con: Louis Fouché 61' (1/1); Pen: Louis Fouché 18', 21', 39', 47' (4/6)	Scoreboard	Try: JJ Engelbrecht 7'; Martin du Toit 26'; Con: Gary van Aswegen 8', 27' (2/2); Pen: Gary van Aswegen 34', 38' (2/7); Cards: Stokkies Hanekom (yellow card) 13' to 56'	Attendance: 1,000; Referee: Francois Veldsman

24 July 2010	Blue Bulls U21	32–34	Free State U21	Loftus Versfeld, Pretoria
15:00	Try: Marnitz Boshoff 20'; Clayton Blommetjies 23'; AJ le Roux 49'; Marnus Schoeman 59'; Con: Marnitz Boshoff 22', 50', 60' (3/4); Pen: Marnitz Boshoff 13', 40' (2/3); Drop: Marnitz Boshoff (0/1)	Scoreboard	Try: Cameron Jacobs 38', 65'; Kholo Ramashala 51'; Con: George Whitehead 39', 66' (2/3); Pen: George Whitehead 4', 11', 26', 34' (4/7); Drop: George Whitehead 15' (1/1)	Referee: Quinton Immelman

Bye/s: Sharks U21

=== Round five ===
31 July 2010	Free State U21	23–27	Sharks U21	Free State Stadium, Bloemfontein
12:50	Try: Cameron Jacobs 27'; Earl Snyman 34'; Con: George Whitehead 28', 35' (2/2); Pen: George Whitehead 31', 68' (2/3); Drop: George Whitehead 61' (1/2); Cards: Philip van der Walt (yellow card) 38'	Scoreboard	Try: penalty try 38'; Arno Christiaan van Zyl 42'; Daniel Adongo 75'; Con: Willie du Plessis 39', 43' (2/2); Guy Cronjé 76' (1/1); Pen: Willie du Plessis 12', 23' (2/4); Drop: Willie du Plessis (0/1)	Attendance: 2,000; Referee: Ben Crouse

31 July 2010	Boland U21	18–34	Leopards U21	Boland Stadium, Wellington
14:00	Try: Dual Erasmus 51'; Percival Godfrey Williams 73'; Con: Brynn Michael Gericke 74' (1/2); Pen: Brynn Michael Gericke 9' (1/2); Drop: Yazeed Johnson 26' (1/1); Cards: Heinrich Adolf Gabler (yellow card) 37' to 45'	Scoreboard	Try: Ernie Strydom 30'; SP Marais 38', 42'; Tiaan Dorfling 80'; Con: Francois Nel 31', 39', 43', 81' (4/4); Pen: Francois Nel 2', 13' (2/3); Cards: Gottlieb du Raan (red card) 47'; Ryno Bosman (yellow card) 62' to 72'; Ernie Strydom (yellow card) 72'	Attendance: 500; Referee: Lusanda Jam

31 July 2010	Golden Lions U21	26–35	Blue Bulls U21	Ellis Park Stadium, Johannesburg
15:00	Try: Rudy Paige 60'; Shane Kirkwood 79'; Con: Dewald Nel 61', 80' (2/2); Pen: Dewald Nel 6', 31', 39', 48' (4/5)	Scoreboard	Try: Deon Helberg 16', 21'; Morné Mellett 42'; Marnus Schoeman 52'; Con: Marnitz Boshoff 17', 43', 53' (3/4); Pen: Marnitz Boshoff 29', 35', 81' (3/5); Drop: Marnitz Boshoff (0/1)	Attendance: 2,000; Referee: Francois Groenewald

Bye/s: Western Province U21

=== Round six ===
6 August 2010	Blue Bulls U21	43–30	Leopards U21	Loftus Versfeld, Pretoria
17:05	Try: Danie Faasen 12'; Sampie Mastriet 15'; Jono Ross 38'; Marnitz Boshoff 61'; Con: Marnitz Boshoff 13', 16', 39', 62' (4/4); Pen: Marnitz Boshoff 49', 58', 64' (3/3); JC Roos 79', 82' (2/2); Drop: Marnitz Boshoff (0/1)	Scoreboard	Try: Jan Gerhardus Joubert 23'; SP Marais 33', 71'; Con: Louis Fouché 24', 34', 72' (3/3); Pen: Louis Fouché 7', 55' (2/3); Drop: Louis Fouché 2' (1/1); Christiaan Alexander Schumyn Botha (0/1)	Referee: Matt Kemp

7 August 2010	Western Province U21	54–0	Boland U21	Danie Craven Stadium, Stellenbosch
14:45	Try: Danie Poolman 5', 16', 52'; Yaya Hartzenberg 46'; Tertius Daniller 69'; Reniel Hugo 75'; JJ Engelbrecht 77'; Reuben Johannes 79'; Con: Gary van Aswegen 10', 47', 53', 70', 76', 78', 80' (7/8)	Scoreboard	Pen: Brynn Michael Gericke (0/1); Drop: Dual Erasmus (0/1); Cards: Percival Godfrey Williams (yellow card) 54' to 64'	Referee: Lusanda Jam

7 August 2010	Sharks U21	49–25	Golden Lions U21	Kings Park Stadium, Durban
15:00	Try: Rosko Specman 1'; Wynand Pienaar 6'; Howard Mnisi 41'; Ross Cronjé 54'; Tera Mtembu 60', 71', 80'; Con: Willie du Plessis 7' (1/2); Guy Cronjé 42', 61', 72' (3/5); Pen: Willie du Plessis 13' (1/1); Ross Cronjé 23' (1/1)	Scoreboard	Try: Marnitz Jacobs 47'; Jacques Erasmus 64'; Sebastian de Chaves 76'; Con: Dewald Nel 65', 77' (2/3); Pen: Dewald Nel 9', 39' (2/3)	Referee: Ben Crouse

Bye/s: Free State U21

=== Round seven ===
13 August 2010	Leopards U21	25–45	Sharks U21	Royal Bafokeng Stadium, Phokeng
17:05	Try: Jaice Terblanche 2'; Joubert Engelbrecht 42'; Andrew van Wyk 74'; Con: Louis Fouché 3', 43' (2/3); Pen: Louis Fouché 25', 49' (2/3)	Scoreboard	Try: Howard Mnisi 6'; Jaco Otto 38'; Tera Mtembu 45'; Jandré Marais 58'; Ross Cronjé 70'; Mark Richards 79'; Con: Guy Cronjé 7', 39', 46', 59' (4/4); Dwayne Jenner 71', 80' (2/2); Pen: Guy Cronjé 10' (1/3); Cards: Jaco Otto (yellow card) 64' to 74'	Attendance: 400

14 August 2010	Golden Lions U21	17–43	Free State U21	Ellis Park Stadium, Johannesburg
12:50	Try: François du Toit 36'; Shane Kirkwood 64'; Con: Dewald Nel 37' (1/1); Hein Cronjé 65' (1/1); Pen: Dewald Nel 10' (1/1)	Scoreboard	Try: Trevor Nyakane 7'; Frank Herne 14', 32'; Cameron Jacobs 28'; Boom Prinsloo 39'; Marcel van der Merwe 79'; Con: George Whitehead 8', 15', 29', 33', 80' (5/6); Pen: George Whitehead 3' (1/1)	Attendance: 1,000; Referee: Francois Veldsman

14 August 2010	Western Province U21	27–16	Blue Bulls U21	Newlands Stadium, Cape Town
14:45	Try: Reniel Hugo 28'; Helmut Lehmann 68'; Con: Gary van Aswegen 69' (1/2); Pen: Gary van Aswegen 4', 16', 44', 51' (4/4); Drop: Gary van Aswegen 79' (1/1); Cards: Quinn Roux (yellow card) 34' to 42'	Scoreboard	Try: Deon Helberg 47', 57'; Con: Marnitz Boshoff (0/2); Pen: Marnitz Boshoff 35', 39' (2/4); Cards: Marnus Schoeman (yellow card) 44' to 55'	Referee: Mlungiseleli Mdashe

Bye/s: Boland U21

=== Round eight ===
20 August 2010	Free State U21	30–24	Leopards U21	Free State Stadium, Bloemfontein
16:45	Try: Kholo Ramashala 32'; George Whitehead 39'; Boom Prinsloo 63'; Con: George Whitehead 33', 40', 64' (3/3); Pen: George Whitehead 6', 42', 76' (3/3)	Scoreboard	Try: Louis Fouché 25'; Andrew van Wyk 67'; Tiaan Dorfling 71'; Con: Louis Fouché 26', 68', 72' (3/3); Pen: Louis Fouché 8' (1/3)	Attendance: 1,000; Referee: Ben Crouse

20 August 2010	Blue Bulls U21	87–10	Boland U21	Loftus Versfeld, Pretoria
17:00	Try: Adri Jacobs 8'; Simphiwe Mtimkulu 16', 75'; Danie Faasen 20'; Tendayi Chikukwa 26', 51'; Dalton Davis 37'; Juan-Philip Pike 42'; Deon Helberg 43'; Francois Brummer 45'; Marnus Schoeman 62', 70'; Rossouw de Klerk 80'; Con: Francois Brummer 9', 16', 21', 27', 43', 46', 52', 63' (8/10); JC Roos 70', 76', 81' (3/3)	Scoreboard	Try: Kenwinn Wiener 54'; Con: Ryan Jarone Jordaan 55' (1/1); Pen: Brynn Michael Gericke 18' (1/1); Cards: Ryan Jarone Jordaan (yellow card) 36' to 46'	Referee: Tiaan Jonker

21 August 2010	Sharks U21	41–14	Western Province U21	Kings Park Stadium, Durban
17:05	Try: Mark Richards 33', 43'; Kyle Cooper 41', 55'; Tera Mtembu 71'; Con: Guy Cronjé 34', 44' (2/5); Pen: Guy Cronjé 4', 15', 19', 46' (4/5)	Scoreboard	Try: Nic Groom 73'; Con: Gary van Aswegen (0/1); Pen: Gary van Aswegen 17', 25', 37' (3/3)	Attendance: 3,000; Referee: Dilbert November

Bye/s: Golden Lions U21

=== Round nine ===
27 August 2010	Boland U21	5–85	Sharks U21	Boland Stadium, Wellington
14:30	Try: Jan Bernadus Hugo 68'; Con: Brynn Michael Gericke (0/1); Pen: Brynn Michael Gericke (0/1)	Scoreboard	Try: Howard Mnisi 2'; S'bura Sithole 4', 53', 62'; Kyle Cooper 11'; Quinton Paul Dormehl 15', 25', 78'; Cameron Quinton Dunlop 29'; Gouws Prinsloo 31', 56', 75'; Willie du Plessis 42'; Con: Willie du Plessis 3', 5', 16', 26', 30', 32', 54', 57', 63', 79' (10/13)	Attendance: 500; Referee: Francois Groenewald

27 August 2010	Golden Lions U21	33–14	Leopards U21	Ellis Park Stadium, Johannesburg
16:45	Try: Hein Cronjé 5', 29'; Wian Buys 7'; Riaan Arends 35'; Jacques Pretorius 65'; Con: Hein Cronjé 6' (1/5); Pen: Hein Cronjé 22', 70' (2/2)	Scoreboard	Try: Andrew van Wyk 27'; Con: Louis Fouché (0/1); Pen: Louis Fouché 10', 12', 46' (3/4); Drop: Christiaan Alexander Schumyn Botha (0/1); Cards: Strand Kruger (yellow card) 66' to 76'	Attendance: 350; Referee: Luke Burger

27 August 2010	Western Province U21	40–39	Free State U21	Newlands Stadium, Cape Town
17:15	Try: Yaya Hartzenberg 15'; Stokkies Hanekom 39'; Danie Poolman 48'; Con: Gary van Aswegen 16', 49' (2/3); Pen: Gary van Aswegen 20', 26', 28', 32', 69', 73', 80' (7/8)	Scoreboard	Try: Marcel van der Merwe 7'; Frank Herne 23'; Robbie van Schalkwyk 58'; Cameron Jacobs 63'; Boom Prinsloo 77'; Con: George Whitehead 8' (1/1); Franna du Toit 24', 59', 78' (3/4); Pen: George Whitehead 11' (1/1); Franna du Toit 37' (1/2); Drop: Franna du Toit (0/1); Cards: Dirk Wessels (yellow card) 31' to 41'	Attendance: 1,000; Referee: Rasta Rasivhenge

Bye/s: Blue Bulls U21

=== Round ten ===
3 September 2010	Boland U21	10–110	Free State U21	Boland Stadium, Wellington
14:30	Try: Percival Godfrey Williams 76'; Con: Gavern Germaine Skippers 77' (1/1); Pen: Gavern Germaine Skippers 1' (1/1)	Scoreboard	Try: Robbie van Schalkwyk 3'; Frank Herne 7'; Mayibuye Ndwandwa 11', 39', 58', 65'; Boom Prinsloo 16', 22', 37'; Lappies Labuschagné 30', 46'; Piet van Zyl 49'; Franna du Toit 51'; Marcel van der Merwe 55', 67'; Martin Ferreira 70'; Con: Franna du Toit 4', 8', 12', 17', 23', 31', 38', 40', 47', 50', 52', 56', 59', 66', 71' (15/16)	Attendance: 400; Referee: Hendrik Greyvenstein

3 September 2010	Golden Lions U21	37–55	Western Province U21	Ellis Park Stadium, Johannesburg
17:05	Try: Riaan Arends 39'; Jaco Kriel 54'; Marnitz Jacobs 67'; Hein Cronjé 78'; Hendrik Daniel la Grange 80'; Con: Hein Cronjé 40', 55', 81' (3/5); Pen: Hein Cronjé 13', 19' (2/2)	Scoreboard	Try: Johann Sadie 8'; Berton Klaasen 14'; Danie Poolman 24', 72'; Stokkies Hanekom 49'; Albé de Swardt 55', 75'; Siya Kolisi 63'; Con: Gary van Aswegen 9', 15', 25', 50', 56' (5/6); Lionel Cronjé 76' (1/2); Pen: Gary van Aswegen 5' (1/2); Drop: Martin du Toit (0/1)	Attendance: 4,000; Referee: Archie Sehlako

4 September 2010	Blue Bulls U21	51–31	Sharks U21	Loftus Versfeld, Pretoria
15:00	Try: Justin van Staden 4'; Francois Brummer 15'; Jono Ross 47'; Marnus Schoeman 51'; Whestley Moolman 63'; Tendayi Chikukwa 71'; Con: Marnitz Boshoff 5', 16', 48', 52', 64', 72' (6/6); Pen: Marnitz Boshoff 24' (1/2); Drop: Marnitz Boshoff 56' (1/2); Justin van Staden 78' (1/2); Cards: Justin van Staden (yellow card) 27'	Scoreboard	Try: Meyer Swanepoel 34'; Tera Mtembu 54'; Mark Richards 61'; Guy Cronjé 76'; Con: Guy Cronjé 35', 55', 62', 77' (4/4); Pen: Guy Cronjé 19' (1/2)	Referee: Tiaan Jonker

Bye/s: Leopards U21

=== Round eleven ===
11 September 2010	Golden Lions U21	57–11	Boland U21	Ellis Park Stadium, Johannesburg
12:50	Try: Jacques Erasmus 11'; Marnitz Jacobs 18', 67'; Blake Leighton Mecuur 29', 65'; Caylib Oosthuizen 37'; Winston Williams 54'; Hein Cronjé 57'; Kabous Janse van Rensburg 64'; Con: Hein Cronjé 30', 38', 55', 57', 65', 66' (6/9)	Scoreboard	Try: Izak Francois Swiegers 61'; Con: Ryan Jarone Jordaan (0/1); Pen: Ryan Jarone Jordaan 26', 34' (2/4); Drop: Wellisly Richaan van Rooy (0/1); Cards: Ryan Jarone Jordaan (yellow card) 78'	Attendance: 2,000; Referee: Quinton Immelman

11 September 2010	Western Province U21	59–17	Leopards U21	Newlands Stadium, Cape Town
14:45	Try: Louis Schreuder 11'; JJ Engelbrecht 22', 39', 47'; Wimpie van der Walt 26'; Danie Poolman 36', 71', 80'; Martin du Toit 69'; Con: Gary van Aswegen 23', 27', 48', 70' (4/9); Pen: Gary van Aswegen 6', 9' (2/2)	Scoreboard	Try: Louis Fouché 32'; SP Marais 61'; Con: Louis Fouche 33', 62' (2/2); Pen: Louis Fouche 17' (1/2)	Attendance: 5,000; Referee: Francois Veldsman

11 September 2010	Free State U21	35–36	Blue Bulls U21	Free State Stadium, Bloemfontein
15:00	Try: Boom Prinsloo 29', 37'; Jamba Ulengo 46'; Mayibuye Ndwandwa 73'; Con: Franna du Toit 30', 38', 74' (3/4); Pen: Nico Scheepers (0/1); Franna du Toit 5', 15', 64' (3/3)	Scoreboard	Try: Marnus Schoeman 40', 54'; Wilhelmus Cornelius Nel 49', 68'; Franco Mostert 59'; Con: Justin van Staden (0/1); Marnitz Boshoff 50', 55', 60', 69' (4/4); Pen: Marnitz Boshoff 79' (1/5); Drop: Justin van Staden (0/1)	Attendance: 3,000; Referee: Mlungiseleli Mdashe

Bye/s: Sharks U21

=== Round twelve ===
17 September 2010	Boland U21	0–111	Western Province U21	Boland Stadium, Wellington
14:30	Cards: Allan Sampson Johnson (yellow card) 56' to 66'	Scoreboard	Try: Helmut Lehmann 3'; Tertius Daniller 13', 26'; Tythan Adams 20', 38', 70', 78'; Danie Poolman 29', 58'; Johann Sadie 36', 48' penalty try 55'; Grant Hattingh 61'; Kurt Coleman 68'; Sidney Tobias 74'; Louis Schreuder 77'; Quinn Roux 79'; Con: Kurt Coleman 4', 14', 27', 37', 39', 56', 59', 69', 71', 75', 78', 79', 80' (13/17)	Referee: Lusanda Jam

18 September 2010	Sharks U21	51–25	Free State U21	Kings Park Stadium, Durban
12:50	Try: Wynand Pienaar 18'; Ross Cronjé 30', 69'; Meyer Swanepoel 39'; Dwayne Jenner 44'; Gouws Prinsloo 79'; Con: Guy Cronjé 19', 31', 40', 45' (4/4); Willie du Plessis 70', 80' (2/2); Pen: Guy Cronjé 10', 50' (2/3); Drop: Willie du Plessis 79' (1/1); Cards: Rosko Specman (yellow card) 59' to 69'	Scoreboard	Try: Robbie van Schalkwyk 48'; Con: Franna du Toit 48' (1/1); Pen: Franna du Toit 13', 24', 33', 38', 60', 65' (6/6)	Referee: Quinton Immelman

18 September 2010	Blue Bulls U21	32–21	Golden Lions U21	Loftus Versfeld, Pretoria
15:00	Try: Andries Ferreira 5'; Adri Jacobs 30'; Wilhelmus Cornelius Nel 59'; Simphiwe Mtimkulu 69'; Con: JC Roos 31' (1/2); Marnitz Boshoff 60', 70' (2/2); Pen: JC Roos 11', 43' (2/4); Drop: JC Roos (0/1)	Scoreboard	Try: Renaldo Bothma 54'; Wessel du Rand 73'; Con: Hein Cronjé 55' (1/2); Pen: Hein Cronjé 9', 36', 39' (3/5)	Attendance: 5,000; Referee: Francois Groenewald

Bye/s: Leopards U21

=== Round thirteen ===
24 September 2010	Free State U21	109–0	Boland U21	Free State Stadium, Bloemfontein
16:45	Try: Franna du Toit 2'; Martin Ferreira 6'; Nico Scheepers 14', 52'; Hanno Pieterse 19', 66'; Mayibuye Ndwandwa 22', 65'; Jamba Ulengo 24', 34'; Marcel van der Merwe 50', 70'; Brendon Groenewald 57', 61'; Oupa Mohojé 63'; Schalk van der Merwe 75'; George Whitehead 77'; Con: George Whitehead 3', 7', 20', 23', 25', 51', 78' (7/10); Franna du Toit 58', 64', 65', 67', 76' (5/6); Nico Scheepers (0/1)	Scoreboard	Cards: Yazeed Johnson (yellow card) 48'; Percival Godfrey Williams (yellow card) 78'	Attendance: 500; Referee: Archie Sehlako

25 September 2010	Leopards U21	36–41	Blue Bulls U21	Olën Park, Potchefstroom
12:50	Try: Joubert Engelbrecht 28'; André Barnard 38'; Leighton Bezuidenhout 52', 57'; Con: Louis Fouché 29', 58' (2/4); Pen: Louis Fouché 9', 25', 34', 67' (4/7); Drop: Louis Fouché (0/1)	Scoreboard	Try: Peet Vorster 22'; Marnitz Boshoff 56'; Danie Faasen 65'; CJ Stander 69'; Sampie Mastriet 77'; Con: Marnitz Boshoff 23', 57', 66', 70', 78' (5/5); Pen: Marnitz Boshoff 5', 14' (2/3)	Attendance: 4,000; Referee: Francois Groenewald

25 September 2010	Golden Lions U21	20–26	Sharks U21	Ellis Park Stadium, Johannesburg
15:00	Try: David Bulbring 19'; Luan Steenkamp 69'; Con: Dewald Nel 20' (1/1); Kabous Janse van Rensburg 70' (1/1); Pen: Dewald Nel 29', 32' (2/2)	Scoreboard	Try: Howard Mnisi 5'; Mark Richards 25'; Wynand Pienaar 61'; Hannes Snyman 65'; Con: Willie du Plessis 6' (1/2); Ross Cronjé 62', 66' (2/2); Pen: Willie du Plessis (0/1)	Attendance: 5,500; Referee: Lusanda Jam

Bye/s: Western Province U21

=== Round fourteen ===
1 October 2010	Sharks U21	57–27	Leopards U21	Kings Park Stadium, Durban
17:05	Try: Mark Richards 2'; Guy Cronjé 20'; Jandré Marais 36'; Ross Cronjé 39'; Rosko Specman 44'; Meyer Swanepoel 47'; Daniel Adongo 49'; Jaco Otto 78'; Con: Guy Cronjé 3', 21', 40', 45', 48', 50' (6/7); Willie du Plessis 79' (1/1); Pen: Willie du Plessis 12' (1/1)	Scoreboard	Try: Christiaan Alexander Schumyn Botha 5'; Andrew van Wyk 23', 73' penalty try 61'; Con: Louis Fouché 6', 62' (2/4); Pen: Louis Fouché 22' (1/2); Drop: Louis Fouché (0/1)	Attendance: 1,000; Referee: Matt Kemp

2 October 2010	Blue Bulls	38–42	Western Province	Loftus Versfeld, Pretoria
12:50	Try: Danie Faasen 7'; Marnitz Boshoff 23'; Tendayi Chikukwa 49'; Marnus Schoeman 58'; Simphiwe Mtimkulu 81'; Con: Marnitz Boshoff 8', 24', 50', 59', 82' (5/5); Pen: Marnitz Boshoff 42' (1/2)	Scoreboard	Try: Danie Poolman 17', 52', 75'; Johann Sadie 47'; Sidney Tobias 63'; Con: Gary van Aswegen 18', 53', 64', 76' (4/5); Pen: Gary van Aswegen 28', 36', 68' (3/5)	Attendance: 10,000; Referee: Mlungiseleli Mdashe

2 October 2010	Free State U21	53–25	Golden Lions U21	Free State Stadium, Bloemfontein
15:00	Try: George Whitehead 13'; Schalk van der Merwe 25'; Hoffmann Maritz 32', 46'; Frank Herne 39'; Jamba Ulengo 63'; Trevor Nyakane 75'; Con: George Whitehead 14', 26', 33', 40', 47', 64' (6/7); Pen: George Whitehead 6', 44' (2/2); Cards: Hoffmann Maritz (yellow card) 67' to 78'	Scoreboard	Try: Mark Robert Hennig 35'; Renaldo Bothma 53'; Kabous Janse van Rensburg 68'; Caylib Oosthuizen 80'; Con: Dewald Nel (0/1); Luan Steenkamp 69' (1/3); Pen: Dewald Nel 19' (1/1)	Attendance: 1,500; Referee: Luke Burger

Bye/s: Boland U21

=== Round fifteen ===
8 October 2010	Leopards U21	62–20	Free State U21	Royal Bafokeng Stadium, Phokeng
17:05	Try: André Barnard 13', 39', 58'; Christiaan Alexander Schumyn Botha 22'; Armandt André Joubert 25'; Tiaan Dorfling 36'; Stompie de Wet 76'; Leighton Bezuidenhout 79'; Con: Louis Fouché 14', 23', 26', 40' (4/6); Francois Nel 76' (1/1); Tershwin Raubenheimer (0/1); Pen: Louis Fouché 4', 9' (2/5); Drop: Louis Fouché 32' (1/2); Francois Nel 71' (1/1)	Scoreboard	Try: Brendon Groenewald 30'; Cameron Jacobs 45'; Inus Kritzinger 75'; Con: George Whitehead (0/1); Franna du Toit 76' (1/2); Pen: George Whitehead 1' (1/2); Cards: Cameron Jacobs (yellow card) 20' to 30'; Oupa Mohojé (yellow card) 56' to 66'	Referee: Archie Sehlako

9 October 2010	Western Province	36–9	Sharks	Newlands Stadium, Cape Town
15:00	Try: Berton Klaasen 16', 37'; Martin du Toit 32'; Nick Köster 59', 71'; Con: Gary van Aswegen 17', 38', 60', 72' (4/5); Pen: Gary van Aswegen 43' (1/1)	Scoreboard	Pen: Guy Cronjé 25', 35', 52' (3/4)	Attendance: 15,000; Referee: Ben Crouse

Bye/s: Blue Bulls U21, Boland U21, Golden Lions U21

=== Semi-finals ===
15 October 2010	Blue Bulls U21	39–35	Sharks U21	Loftus Versfeld, Pretoria
17:00	Try: Deon Helberg 5'; Andries Ferreira 33'; Marnitz Boshoff 40'; Marnus Schoeman 50', 53'; Con: Marnitz Boshoff 40', 51', 54' (3/4); Francois Brummer 34' (1/1); Pen: Marnitz Boshoff 38', 75' (2/2); Drop: Francois Brummer (0/1); Cards: Sampie Mastriet (yellow card) 61' to 72'	Scoreboard	Try: Mark Richards 2'; Guy Cronjé 22'; Dale Chadwick 26', 64'; Con: Guy Cronjé 3', 23', 27' (3/4); Pen: Guy Cronjé 19', 29', 43' (3/5); Drop: Gouws Prinsloo (0/1); Cards: Juan Language (yellow card) 49' to 59'; Howard Mnisi (yellow card) 76'	Attendance: 500; Referee: Quinton Immelman

16 October 2010	Western Province U21	49–49 (aet)	Free State U21	Newlands Stadium, Cape Town
14:25	Try: Nick Köster 10'; Martin du Toit 22'; Sidney Tobias 34'; Ruan Smith 52'; Johann Sadie 79'; Stephan Greeff 89'; Con: Gary van Aswegen 11', 23', 35', 53', 90' (5/6); Pen: Gary van Aswegen 71', 82', 95' (3/4)	Scoreboard	Try: Cameron Jacobs 13', 19'; Inus Kritzinger 75'; Lappies Labuschagné 98'; Con: Franna du Toit 14', 20', 76', 99' (4/4); Pen: Franna du Toit 4', 29', 37', 62', 88', 92' (6/6); Drop: Franna du Toit 9' (1/2); Cards: Lappies Labuschagné (yellow card) 50' to 60'; Martin Ferreira (yellow card) 85' to 95'; Gavin Annandale (yellow card) 94'	Attendance: 20,000; Referee: Archie Sehlako

- Western Province U21 progressed to the final by virtue of scoring more tries in their semi-final match.

=== Final ===
30 October 2010	Blue Bulls U21	32–43	Western Province U21	Kings Park Stadium, Durban
14:30	Try: Jono Ross 28'; Gerhard van den Heever 42', 79'; Sampie Mastriet 77'; Con: Marnitz Boshoff 29', 78', 80' (3/4); Pen: Marnitz Boshoff 6', 24' (2/3)	Scoreboard"	Try: Gary van Aswegen 51'; Louis Schreuder 60'; Johann Sadie 67', 72'; Con: Gary van Aswegen 52', 61', 68', 73' (4/4); Pen: Gary van Aswegen 3', 8', 10', 17', 31' (5/8)	Attendance: 5,000; Referee: Tiaan Jonker

== Honours ==
The honour roll for the 2010 Under-21 Provincial Championship Group A was as follows:

2010 Under-21 Provincial Championship Group A Honours
Champions:	Western Province U21
Top Try Scorer:	Danie Poolman, Western Province U21 (17)
Top Points Scorer:	Gary van Aswegen, Western Province U21 (207)

== Players ==
=== Player statistics ===
The following table contain points which were scored in the 2010 Under-21 Provincial Championship Group A:

All point scorers
No	Player	Team	T	C	P	DG	Pts
1	Gary van Aswegen	Western Province U21	1	44	37	1	207
2	Marnitz Boshoff	Blue Bulls U21	5	39	20	1	166
3	Louis Fouché	Leopards U21	3	25	22	2	137
4	George Whitehead	Free State U21	3	30	18	2	135
5	Franna du Toit	Free State U21	2	32	16	1	125
6	Guy Cronjé	Sharks U21	3	27	14	0	111
7	Willie du Plessis	Sharks U21	2	31	7	1	96
8	Danie Poolman	Western Province U21	17	0	0	0	85
9	Hein Cronjé	Golden Lions U21	4	12	7	0	65
9	Marnus Schoeman	Blue Bulls U21	13	0	0	0	65
11	Dewald Nel	Golden Lions U21	0	8	13	0	55
12	Mark Richards	Sharks U21	10	0	0	0	50
13	Cameron Jacobs	Free State U21	8	0	0	0	40
13	Boom Prinsloo	Free State U21	8	0	0	0	40
15	SP Marais	Leopards U21	7	2	0	0	39
16	JJ Engelbrecht	Western Province U21	7	0	0	0	35
16	Joubert Engelbrecht	Leopards U21	7	0	0	0	35
16	Mayibuye Ndwandwa	Free State U21	7	0	0	0	35
16	Johann Sadie	Western Province U21	7	0	0	0	35
20	Ross Cronjé	Sharks U21	5	2	1	0	32
21	Kurt Coleman	Western Province U21	1	13	0	0	31
22	Tiaan Dorfling	Leopards U21	6	0	0	0	30
22	Deon Helberg	Blue Bulls U21	6	0	0	0	30
22	Howard Mnisi	Sharks U21	6	0	0	0	30
22	Tera Mtembu	Sharks U21	6	0	0	0	30
22	Meyer Swanepoel	Sharks U21	6	0	0	0	30
22	Marcel van der Merwe	Free State U21	6	0	0	0	30
22	Andrew van Wyk	Leopards U21	6	0	0	0	30
29	Brynn Michael Gericke	Boland U21	0	4	7	0	29
30	Francois Brummer	Blue Bulls U21	2	9	0	0	28
31	Frank Herne	Free State U21	5	0	0	0	25
32	JC Roos	Blue Bulls U21	0	5	4	0	22
33	Tythan Adams	Western Province U21	4	0	0	0	20
33	André Barnard	Leopards U21	4	0	0	0	20
33	Tendayi Chikukwa	Blue Bulls U21	4	0	0	0	20
33	Martin du Toit	Western Province U21	4	0	0	0	20
33	Danie Faasen	Blue Bulls U21	4	0	0	0	20
33	Marnitz Jacobs	Golden Lions U21	4	0	0	0	20
33	Berton Klaasen	Western Province U21	4	0	0	0	20
33	Nick Köster	Western Province U21	4	0	0	0	20
33	Simphiwe Mtimkulu	Blue Bulls U21	4	0	0	0	20
33	Jaco Otto	Sharks U21	4	0	0	0	20
33	Gouws Prinsloo	Sharks U21	4	0	0	0	20
33	Cobus Reinach	Sharks U21	4	0	0	0	20
33	Jono Ross	Blue Bulls U21	4	0	0	0	20
33	Jamba Ulengo	Free State U21	4	0	0	0	20
47	Francois Nel	Leopards U21	0	5	2	1	19
47	Justin van Staden	Blue Bulls U21	2	3	0	1	19
49	Luan Steenkamp	Golden Lions U21	3	1	0	0	17
50	Leighton Bezuidenhout	Leopards U21	3	0	0	0	15
50	Kyle Cooper	Sharks U21	3	0	0	0	15
50	Tertius Daniller	Western Province U21	3	0	0	0	15
50	Quinton Paul Dormehl	Sharks U21	3	0	0	0	15
50	Brendon Groenewald	Free State U21	3	0	0	0	15
50	Yaya Hartzenberg	Western Province U21	3	0	0	0	15
50	Jaco Kriel	Golden Lions U21	3	0	0	0	15
50	Lappies Labuschagné	Free State U21	3	0	0	0	15
50	Hoffmann Maritz	Free State U21	3	0	0	0	15
50	Sampie Mastriet	Blue Bulls U21	3	0	0	0	15
50	Wilhelmus Cornelius Nel	Blue Bulls U21	3	0	0	0	15
50	Wynand Pienaar	Sharks U21	3	0	0	0	15
50	Louis Schreuder	Western Province U21	3	0	0	0	15
50	S'bura Sithole	Sharks U21	3	0	0	0	15
50	Rosko Specman	Sharks U21	3	0	0	0	15
50	Sidney Tobias	Western Province U21	3	0	0	0	15
50	Robbie van Schalkwyk	Free State U21	3	0	0	0	15
50	Piet van Zyl	Free State U21	3	0	0	0	15
50	Percival Godfrey Williams	Boland U21	3	0	0	0	15
69	Kabous Janse van Rensburg	Golden Lions U21	2	1	0	0	12
70	Justin Botha	Golden Lions U21	0	1	3	0	11
71	Daniel Adongo	Sharks U21	2	0	0	0	10
71	Riaan Arends	Golden Lions U21	2	0	0	0	10
71	Clayton Blommetjies	Blue Bulls U21	2	0	0	0	10
71	Christiaan Alexander Schumyn Botha	Leopards U21	2	0	0	0	10
71	Renaldo Bothma	Golden Lions U21	2	0	0	0	10
71	Dale Chadwick	Sharks U21	2	0	0	0	10
71	Albé de Swardt	Western Province U21	2	0	0	0	10
71	François du Toit	Golden Lions U21	2	0	0	0	10
71	Dual Erasmus	Boland U21	2	0	0	0	10
71	Jacques Erasmus	Golden Lions U21	2	0	0	0	10
71	Andries Ferreira	Blue Bulls U21	2	0	0	0	10
71	Martin Ferreira	Free State U21	2	0	0	0	10
71	Stokkies Hanekom	Western Province U21	2	0	0	0	10
71	Reniel Hugo	Western Province U21	2	0	0	0	10
71	Adri Jacobs	Blue Bulls U21	2	0	0	0	10
71	Shane Kirkwood	Golden Lions U21	2	0	0	0	10
71	Inus Kritzinger	Free State U21	2	0	0	0	10
71	AJ le Roux	Blue Bulls U21	2	0	0	0	10
71	Helmut Lehmann	Western Province U21	2	0	0	0	10
71	Jandré Marais	Sharks U21	2	0	0	0	10
71	Blake Leighton Mecuur	Golden Lions U21	2	0	0	0	10
71	Whestley Moolman	Blue Bulls U21	2	0	0	0	10
71	Trevor Nyakane	Free State U21	2	0	0	0	10
71	Caylib Oosthuizen	Golden Lions U21	2	0	0	0	10
71	Rudy Paige	Golden Lions U21	2	0	0	0	10
71	Hanno Pieterse	Free State U21	2	0	0	0	10
71	Kholo Ramashala	Free State U21	2	0	0	0	10
71	Nico Scheepers	Free State U21	2	0	0	0	10
71	Earl Snyman	Free State U21	2	0	0	0	10
71	Gerhard van den Heever	Blue Bulls U21	2	0	0	0	10
71	Schalk van der Merwe	Free State U21	2	0	0	0	10
71	Peet Vorster	Blue Bulls U21	2	0	0	0	10
103	Dwayne Jenner	Sharks U21	1	2	0	0	9
104	Ryan Jarone Jordaan	Boland U21	0	1	2	0	8
105	Donovan Theodore Arendse	Boland U21	1	0	0	0	5
105	Lee Thomas Becker	Boland U21	1	0	0	0	5
105	David Bulbring	Golden Lions U21	1	0	0	0	5
105	Wian Buys	Golden Lions U21	1	0	0	0	5
105	Dalton Davis	Blue Bulls U21	1	0	0	0	5
105	Sebastian de Chaves	Golden Lions U21	1	0	0	0	5
105	Rossouw de Klerk	Blue Bulls U21	1	0	0	0	5
105	Stompie de Wet	Leopards U21	1	0	0	0	5
105	Ernst Dinkelmann	Blue Bulls U21	1	0	0	0	5
105	Wessel du Rand	Golden Lions U21	1	0	0	0	5
105	Cameron Quinton Dunlop	Sharks U21	1	0	0	0	5
105	Divan Ferguson	Golden Lions U21	1	0	0	0	5
105	Francois Geduld	Boland U21	1	0	0	0	5
105	Stephan Greeff	Western Province U21	1	0	0	0	5
105	Lambert Groenewald	Sharks U21	1	0	0	0	5
105	Nic Groom	Western Province U21	1	0	0	0	5
105	Grant Hattingh	Western Province U21	1	0	0	0	5
105	Mark Robert Hennig	Golden Lions U21	1	0	0	0	5
105	Jan Bernadus Hugo	Boland U21	1	0	0	0	5
105	Reuben Johannes	Western Province U21	1	0	0	0	5
105	Armandt André Joubert	Leopards U21	1	0	0	0	5
105	Jan Gerhardus Joubert	Leopards U21	1	0	0	0	5
105	Siya Kolisi	Western Province U21	1	0	0	0	5
105	Hendrik Daniel la Grange	Golden Lions U21	1	0	0	0	5
105	Morné Mellett	Blue Bulls U21	1	0	0	0	5
105	Oupa Mohojé	Free State U21	1	0	0	0	5
105	Justin Kelvyn Gizzler Morgan	Boland U21	1	0	0	0	5
105	Franco Mostert	Blue Bulls U21	1	0	0	0	5
105	Juan-Philip Pike	Blue Bulls U21	1	0	0	0	5
105	Jacques Pretorius	Golden Lions U21	1	0	0	0	5
105	Quinn Roux	Western Province U21	1	0	0	0	5
105	Gavern Germaine Skippers	Boland U21	0	1	1	0	5
105	JP Smith	Western Province U21	1	0	0	0	5
105	Ruan Smith	Western Province U21	1	0	0	0	5
105	Hannes Snyman	Sharks U21	1	0	0	0	5
105	CJ Stander	Blue Bulls U21	1	0	0	0	5
105	Ernie Strydom	Leopards U21	1	0	0	0	5
105	Izak Francois Swiegers	Boland U21	1	0	0	0	5
105	Heinrich Terblanche	Golden Lions U21	1	0	0	0	5
105	Jaice Terblanche	Leopards U21	1	0	0	0	5
105	Wimpie van der Walt	Western Province U21	1	0	0	0	5
105	Arno Christiaan van Zyl	Sharks U21	1	0	0	0	5
105	Kenwinn Wiener	Boland U21	1	0	0	0	5
105	Juandré Williams	Leopards U21	1	0	0	0	5
105	Winston Williams	Golden Lions U21	1	0	0	0	5
150	Yazeed Johnson	Boland U21	0	0	0	1	3
151	Lionel Cronjé	Western Province U21	0	1	0	0	2
—	penalty try	Leopards U21	1	0	0	0	5
—	penalty try	Sharks U21	1	0	0	0	5
—	penalty try	Western Province U21	1	0	0	0	5
* Legend: T = Tries, C = Conversions, P = Penalties, DG = Drop Goals, Pts = Points.

=== Squad lists ===
The teams released the following squad lists:

2010 Blue Bulls U21 squad
Forwards

Mlungisi Bali • Robbie Coetzee • Eugene Cunha • Dalton Davis • Rossouw de Klerk • Ernst Dinkelmann • Andries Ferreira • Cornell Hess • Vincent Koch • AJ le Roux • Morné Mellett • Franco Mostert • Wilhelmus Cornelius Nel • Juan-Philip Pike • Jono Ross • Marnus Schoeman • CJ Stander • Jacques Verwey • Peet Vorster

Backs

Clayton Blommetjies • Marnitz Boshoff • Francois Brummer • Tendayi Chikukwa • Andries Coetzee • Branco du Preez • Danie Faasen • Deon Helberg • Adri Jacobs • Sampie Mastriet • Whestley Moolman • Simphiwe Mtimkulu • JC Roos • Tom Seabela • Gerhard van den Heever • Ruan van Rooyen • Justin van Staden

Did not play

Antonie Earle • Etienne Carel Greeff • Tertius Christiaan Harmse • Kurt Haupt • Mulaleni Alfred Khoza • GD Kotzee • Ryno Richard Lopes • Andrew Lulama Mabeta • Mpho Thabo Motau • Jaco Oosthuizen • Marius Oosthuizen • Tumelo Abram Thage • Abraham Philippus van der Merwe

2010 Boland U21 squad
Forwards

Fyzel Cornell Afrika • Lee Thomas Becker • TC Botha • Michael Patrick Dammert • Regis Pierre Daniels • Donovan Dirks • Ashley Peter Godfrey Dreyden • Daniel van Renen Ferreira • Jeffrey William Fransman • Gerhardus Goosen • Charl Gerhardus Herbst • Hermanus Izak Janse van Rensburg • Allan Sampson Johnson • Rossouw Kruger • Herman Johan Louw • Roberto Lupini • Ashley Ernest Raaf • Franklin Garen Smit • Nicolaas Strydom • Harold Geraldo Stuart • Izak Francois Swiegers • Francois van Wyk • Paulus Philuppus Viljoen • Ashwell Williams • Johnwin Witbooi

Backs

Donovan Theodore Arendse • Wichard Boonzaaier • Graeme Peter Cupido • Dual Erasmus • Heinrich Adolf Gabler • Francois Geduld • Brynn Michael Gericke • Jan Bernadus Hugo • Yazeed Johnson • Ryan Jarone Jordaan • Johandré Lazenby • Justin Kelvyn Gizzler Morgan • Gavern Germaine Skippers • Hendrik Handré van der Merwe • Wellisly Richaan van Rooy • Tashwill Silvino van Zyl • Evan Andrew Visser • Kenwinn Wiener • Percival Godfrey Williams

Did not play

Stewart Heinrich Collison • Randel Jaquen Geldenhuys

2010 Free State U21 squad
Forwards

Gavin Annandale • JC Astle • Antonie Earle • Martin Ferreira • Deon Gouws • Brendon Groenewald • Richard Harris • Frank Herne • Niel Kapp • Lappies Labuschagné • Oupa Mohojé • Tumelo Moholo • Trevor Nyakane • Hanno Pieterse • Boom Prinsloo • Marcel van der Merwe • Schalk van der Merwe • Fanie van der Walt • Philip van der Walt • Henry van Niekerk • Dirk Wessels

Backs

Enrico Acker • Riaan Britz • Franna du Toit • Cameron Jacobs • Inus Kritzinger • Hoffmann Maritz • Alec Mhlanga • Mayibuye Ndwandwa • Jaco Oosthuizen • Kholo Ramashala • Nico Scheepers • Earl Snyman • Jamba Ulengo • Robbie van Schalkwyk • Piet van Zyl • George Whitehead

Did not play

Moekoa Bolofo • William Clift • Erick Colyn • Zandré de Bruin • Sias Ebersohn • Evert Ryno Fourie • Egan Gysman • John-Henry Harris • James Calib William Hellawell • Siya Mangaliso • Shaun McGeer • Izak Stephanus Muller • Jan Petrus Oosthuizen • Grant Ramohapetjie Shai • Divandré Strydom • Juan-Pierre van Rooyen • Johan van Schalkwyk

2010 Golden Lions U21 squad
Forwards

Louis Albertse • Renaldo Bothma • David Bulbring • Sebastian de Chaves • Ruan Dreyer • Wessel du Rand • François du Toit • Marcell Esterhuyse • Herman Fourie • Wouter Heijmans • Mark Robert Hennig • Marnitz Jacobs • Shane Kirkwood • Ashley Kohler • Jaco Kriel • Hendrik Daniel la Grange • RJ Liebenberg • Shaun McDonald • Caylib Oosthuizen • Maurice Johan Rudman • Heinrich Terblanche • Ewald van der Westhuizen • Thurston Christopher Zimri

Backs

Riaan Arends • Justin Botha • Wian Buys • Hein Cronjé • Jacques Erasmus • Chuma Faas • Divan Ferguson • Kabous Janse van Rensburg • Morné Laubscher • Blake Leighton Mecuur • Wandile Mjekevu • Dewald Nel • Sandile Ngcobo • Rudy Paige • Wilton Pietersen • Jacques Pretorius • Luan Steenkamp • Winston Williams

Did not play

Sean Mark Manton • Faubou Simplice • PJ Uys • Daniel van der Merwe

2010 Leopards U21 squad
Forwards

André Barnard • Ryno Bosman • Andries Botha • Stompie de Wet • Cornell du Preez • Gottlieb du Raan • Marius Fourie • Jan Gerhardus Joubert • Strand Kruger • JC Oberholzer • Henri Scharneck • Chris Schoonraad • Solomzi Sotsaka • Ernie Strydom • HP Swart • Jaice Terblanche • John Andrew Truter • Marchant van Rooyen • Jamie Zwiegelaar

Backs

Leighton Bezuidenhout • Christiaan Alexander Schumyn Botha • Tiaan Dorfling • Joubert Engelbrecht • Louis Fouché • Armandt André Joubert • SP Marais • Francois Nel • Tershwin Raubenheimer • Dylon Steward Siegelaar • Hennie Skorbinski • Andrew van Wyk • Juandré Williams

Did not play

Jacob Daniel de Villiers • Adriaan Engelbrecht • Gerhard Nortier • Christo Potgieter • Clinton Wagman

2010 Sharks U21 squad
Forwards

Daniel Adongo • Tim Agaba • Dale Chadwick • Kyle Cooper • Cameron Quinton Dunlop • Dexter Fahey • Roy Godfrey • Lambert Groenewald • Monde Hadebe • Francois Hanekom • Juan Language • Shaun Malton • Jandré Marais • Peet Marais • Tera Mtembu • Kene Okafor • Jaco Otto • Julian Redelinghuys • Hannes Snyman • Meyer Swanepoel • Adriaan Theisinger

Backs

De Wet Bergh • Guy Cronjé • Ross Cronjé • Quinton Paul Dormehl • Willie du Plessis • Dwayne Jenner • Piet Lindeque • Howard Mnisi • Wynand Pienaar • Gouws Prinsloo • Charles Purdon • Cobus Reinach • Mark Richards • S'bura Sithole • Rosko Specman • Arno Christiaan van Zyl

Did not play

Roy Bursey • Faizel Gerald de Bruin

2010 Western Province U21 squad
Forwards
Backs

Tom Botha • Tertius Daniller • Albé de Swardt • Stephan Greeff • Yaya Hartzenberg • Grant Hattingh • Reniel Hugo • Reuben Johannes • Siya Kolisi • Nick Köster • Helmut Lehmann • Samkelo Mabombo • Quinn Roux • JP Smith • Ruan Smith • Sidney Tobias • Wimpie van der Walt • Alistair Vermaak

Tythan Adams • Kurt Coleman • Lionel Cronjé • JP du Plessis • Martin du Toit • JJ Engelbrecht • Nic Groom • Stokkies Hanekom • Berton Klaasen • Sam Lane • Ryan Nell • Nathanael Paul Pekeur • Danie Poolman • Johann Sadie • Louis Schreuder • Gary van Aswegen

=== Discipline ===
The following table contains all the cards handed out during the tournament:

Cards
Player	Team	Sent off (straight red)	Temporarily suspended
Lee Thomas Becker	Boland U21	1	0
Gottlieb du Raan	Leopards U21	1	0
Percival Godfrey Williams	Boland U21	0	2
Ryan Jarone Jordaan	Boland U21	0	2
Fyzel Cornell Afrika	Boland U21	0	1
Gavin Annandale	Free State U21	0	1
Ryno Bosman	Leopards U21	0	1
Tendayi Chikukwa	Blue Bulls U21	0	1
Martin Ferreira	Free State U21	0	1
Louis Fouché	Leopards U21	0	1
Heinrich Adolf Gabler	Boland U21	0	1
Gerhardus Goosen	Boland U21	0	1
Stokkies Hanekom	Western Province U21	0	1
Cameron Jacobs	Free State U21	0	1
Allan Sampson Johnson	Boland U21	0	1
Yazeed Johnson	Boland U21	0	1
Strand Kruger	Leopards U21	0	1
Hendrik Daniel la Grange	Golden Lions U21	0	1
Lappies Labuschagné	Free State U21	0	1
Juan Language	Sharks U21	0	1
Hoffmann Maritz	Free State U21	0	1
Sampie Mastriet	Blue Bulls U21	0	1
Howard Mnisi	Sharks U21	0	1
Oupa Mohojé	Free State U21	0	1
Jaco Otto	Sharks U21	0	1
Jono Ross	Blue Bulls U21	0	1
Quinn Roux	Western Province U21	0	1
Marnus Schoeman	Blue Bulls U21	0	1
Rosko Specman	Sharks U21	0	1
Luan Steenkamp	Golden Lions U21	0	1
Ernie Strydom	Leopards U21	0	1
Philip van der Walt	Free State U21	0	1
Wimpie van der Walt	Western Province U21	0	1
Justin van Staden	Blue Bulls U21	0	1
Dirk Wessels	Free State U21	0	1
* Legend: (red card) = Sent off, (yellow card) = Sin-binned

== Referees ==
The following referees officiated matches in the 2010 Under-21 Provincial Championship Group A:

- Luke Burger
- Ben Crouse
- Hendrik Greyvenstein
- Francois Groenewald
- Quinton Immelman
- Lusanda Jam
- Tiaan Jonker
- Matt Kemp
- Mlungiseleli Mdashe
- Dilbert November
- Rasta Rasivhenge
- Archie Sehlako
- Francois Veldsman

== See also ==
- Currie Cup
- 2010 Currie Cup Premier Division
- 2010 Currie Cup First Division
