= Louis Fouché (rugby union) =

South African rugby union player (born 1990)

- Full name: Louis Daniel van Zyl Fouché
- Born: 4 January 1990 (age 36) Pretoria, South Africa
- Height: 1.89 m (6 ft 2 1/2 in)
- Weight: 98 kg (216 lb; 15 st 6 lb)
- School: Hoërskool Rustenburg, Rustenburg

Rugby union career
- Position: Fly-half
- Current team: Cheetahs / Free State Cheetahs
Youth career
- 2007–2010: Leopards
- 2011: Blue Bulls
Senior career
Years	Team	Apps	(Points)
2011–2014	Blue Bulls	28	(308)
2012–2014	Bulls	23	(47)
2014–2015	Ricoh Black Rams	3	(0)
2015	Blue Bulls	8	(32)
2016	Southern Kings	14	(81)
2016–2018	Kubota Spears	12	(39)
2018–present	Free State Cheetahs	13	(77)
2018–present	Cheetahs	17	(32)
- Correct as of 21 October 2019

Louis Daniel van Zyl Fouché (born 4 January 1990) is a South African rugby union player for the Cheetahs in the Pro14 and the Free State Cheetahs in the Currie Cup. His regular position is fly-half.

== Rugby career ==
=== 2007–2010 : Youth / Leopards ===
Fouché was born in Pretoria and grew up in Rustenburg. In 2007, he was selected to represent the Rustenburg-based Leopards at the 2007 Under-18 Academy Week tournament. The following year, he represented the Leopards at the premier high school rugby union tournament in South Africa, the Under-18 Craven Week held in Pretoria, starting all three of their matches at the tournament and scoring 12 points. At the conclusion of the Craven Week, he was also named in an Under-18 Elite Squad.

Fouché joined the Leopards academy after finishing high school and in 2009, he was included in their Under-19 squad that competed in the Under-19 Provincial Championship. However, after just three appearances, he was promoted to the Leopards U21 team. He made three appearances for them, but could not prevent them finishing bottom of Group A. However, he scored 18 points in their relegation play-off match against Griquas to help them to a 38–27 win to retain their place in Group A of the competition.

Fouché was the undisputed first-choice fly-half for the Leopards Under-21 side in the 2010 Under-21 Provincial Championship Group A, starting eleven of their twelve matches in the competition. He was the Leopards U21s' top scorer in the competition, scoring three tries, 25 conversions, 22 penalties and two drop goals for a total of 137 points, the third-highest in the competition behind Gary van Aswegen of Western Province U21 and Marnitz Boshoff of Blue Bulls U21.

=== 2011–2013 : Blue Bulls / Bulls ===
Fouché's performances didn't go unnoticed by other teams and he was contracted by the Pretoria-based Blue Bulls prior to the 2011 season. On 26 February 2011, Fouché made his first class debut by starting their opening match of the 2011 Vodacom Cup against a Sharks XV in Durban, scoring eleven points in a 19–30 defeat. He also started their match against Pampas XV and played off the bench in matches against the Boland Cavaliers and Western Province.

In July 2011, Fouché represented the Blue Bulls U21 side in the 2011 Under-21 Provincial Championship. He played in their first four matches of the competition, scoring 20 points against Sharks U21, 22 points against Free State U21, nine points against Western Province U21 and 28 points against trans-Jukskei rivals Golden Lions U21. He was included on the bench for the Blue Bulls' 2011 Currie Cup Premier Division match against the Pumas in Nelspruit and made his Currie Cup debut by coming on in the 66th minute of the match. He also scored his first points at this level, kicking a drop goal in the final minute of a 16–12 victory. He was promoted to the starting line-up for their next match against Griquas and justified his selection by scoring a try, two penalties and four conversions to score 19 points in the Blue Bulls' 44–20 victory. He was the Blue Bulls' starting fly-half for the remainder of the competition, scoring a total of 126 in his nine appearances to make him the Blue Bulls' leading points scorer and joint-fifth place on the overall scoring charts. However, the Blue Bulls had a poor season and finished in fifth spot on the log, missing out on the semi-finals. With the Under-21 Provincial Championship in its play-off stage, Fouché reverted to the Under-21 side for their semi-final match against Golden Lions U21, kicking 15 points in a 47–18 victory. He was also the Blue Bulls U21s' top scorer in the final, where he kicked five conversions and two penalties to help the Blue Bulls to a 46–30 victory to win the championship. Despite missing eight matches due to his involvement with the senior side, he still finished fifth on the points-scoring charts, with 110 points in just six appearances.

In 2012, Fouché was included in the Bulls squad for the 2012 Super Rugby season. He was the understudy to their main fly-half, Morné Steyn, throughout the competition and was named on the bench for all seventeen of their matches in the competition. He made his Super Rugby debut on 24 February 2012 in their first match of the competition, coming on in the 72nd minute of an 18–13 victory over the Sharks in Pretoria. Fouché was used in ten of their matches and scored his only points in the competition when he converted a CJ Stander try in their 61–8 victory over Australian side the Reds. The Bulls finished the season in fifth position on the overall log to qualify for the finals and Fouché also appeared for the final few minutes of their 13–28 defeat to the Crusaders in Christchurch in the qualifier, which saw them eliminated from the competition. With Steyn on duty with the South Africa national team, Fouché was the first choice fly-half for the Blue Bulls during the 2012 Currie Cup Premier Division. He started nine of their ten of their matches during the regular season of the competition, scoring 137 points (through 12 conversions, 35 penalties and two drop goals) to help the Blue Bulls finish in fourth position to secure the final semi-final berth. Some of his personal highlights included a 28-point haul in a 42–31 victory over the Sharks and a 25-point contribution against Griquas. The only match he didn't start during the regular season was their final match against the Golden Lions, when Steyn returned to the side and he was also started their semi-final match against the Sharks in Durban. Fouché came on in the 68th minute of the semi-final, but could not prevent the hosts winning the match 20–3 to progress to the final.

Fouché was still mainly used as Steyn's understudy for the Bulls during the 2013 Super Rugby season, but he made his first Super Rugby start in the Bulls' match against the Reds in Brisbane, kicking 15 of the Bulls' points in an 18–23 defeat. He scored his first Super Rugby try in a 48–14 victory over the Hurricanes and made a total of nine appearances as a replacement during the competition. He got a second start in a 48–18 win against the Southern Kings in Round Eighteen of the competition and scored a try in the eighth minute of the match. However, he suffered a torn knee ligament that ruled him out of the remainder of the competition. He scored a total of 33 points as the Bulls were crowned South African Conference winners and finishing second overall, eventually losing 23–26 to the Brumbies in the semi-final. During the Super Rugby season, he signed a contract extension to keep him at the Blue Bulls until the end of 2015.

His knee ligament injury prevented him from playing in the 2013 Currie Cup and he only returned to action during the 2014 Super Rugby season. He started their first two matches of the competition against the Sharks and Cheetahs, scoring twelve points. He was dropped from the side and found him behind Jacques-Louis Potgieter and Handré Pollard in the pecking order and made no further appearances in the competition. He did play in the 2014 Vodacom Cup for the Blue Bulls, however, making four starts and scoring 32 points.

=== 2014–2015 : Ricoh Black Rams / Return to Blue Bulls ===
In June 2014, the Blue Bulls allowed him to join Japanese Top League side Ricoh Black Rams on a one-year contract. He didn't have the most successful time in Japan either, making just three appearances as a replacement in 2014–15 Top League matches against Coca-Cola Red Sparks, NTT DoCoMo Red Hurricanes and Toyota Verblitz.

Fouché returned to the Blue Bulls prior to the 2015 Currie Cup Premier Division, and made eight appearances in the competition, scoring 32 points. However, he started just one of their matches, a 14–29 defeat to Western Province, mainly used as backup to Tian Schoeman. The Blue Bulls finished in second position on the log, but lost in their semi-final match against Western Province.

=== 2016 : Eastern Province Kings / Southern Kings ===
After the 2015 season, he was recruited by Port Elizabeth-based Eastern Province Kings. Shortly after arriving, the worsening financial situation at the Eastern Province Kings resulted in all players' contracts being declared null and void, but Fouché was one of the first 20 players that the South African Rugby Union contracted to represent the Southern Kings in the 2016 Super Rugby season.

=== 2016–2018 : Kubota Spears ===
Fouché returned to Japan for a second spell prior to the 2016–17 Top League, signing with the Kubota Spears.
