= Andrew van Wyk =

South African rugby union player

- Full name: Andrew Justerine Deometrie van Wyk
- Born: 4 August 1989 (age 37) Prieska, South Africa
- Height: 1.78 m (5 ft 10 in)
- Weight: 88 kg (194 lb; 13 st 12 lb)
- School: Hoërskool Diamantveld, Kimberley
- University: North-West University

Rugby union career
- Position: Winger / Centre
- Current team: Falcons
Youth career
- 2005–2007: Griquas
- 2008–2010: Leopards
Amateur team(s)
Years	Team	Apps	(Points)
2009–2012	NWU Pukke	29	(65)
Senior career
Years	Team	Apps	(Points)
2011–2013	Leopards	8	(0)
2011–2013	Leopards XV	4	(0)
2013	Border Bulldogs	12	(25)
2014–2021	Falcons	70	(93)
- Correct as of 27 March 2022

Andrew Justerine Deometrie van Wyk (born 4 August 1989) is a South African professional rugby union player for the Falcons in the Currie Cup and the Rugby Challenge. His regular position is winger or centre.

== Career ==
=== Youth and Varsity Cup rugby ===
He was selected for several youth tournaments by his local provincial side, Griquas. In 2005, he was selected in their Under-16 squad for the Grant Khomo Week tournament and in both 2006 and 2007, he was selected for their Under-18 Craven Week side. Towards the end of 2007, he was also a member of the Griquas U19 side that participated in the Under-19 Provincial Championship.

In 2008, Van Wyk moved to Potchefstroom where he became involved in rugby for university side NWU Pukke, as well as the Potchefstroom-based provincial outfit the Leopards. He played for the Leopards U21 side in the 2008, 2009 and 2010 Under-21 Provincial Championships. He scored six tries in 2010, one behind the joint-leading try-scorers for the Leopards U21 side, SP Marais and Joubert Engelbrecht.

He played Varsity Cup rugby for four consecutive seasons between 2009 and 2012. He scored two tries in nine appearances in his maiden season in the competition in 2009. One try followed in both 2010 (in five appearances) and 2011 (in seven starts), but 2012 was the season when he sprung to prominence with his performances, scoring nine tries in eight starts to finish the season as joint-top try scorer in the competition with UJ's Chrysander Botha. His scoring spree included three braces during the competition, against the NMMU Madibaz, eventual champions UP Tuks and UFS Shimlas.

=== Leopards ===
Van Wyk was named on the bench for the Leopards' 2011 Currie Cup Premier Division match against Western Province and came on with a few minutes remaining in the match to make his first class and Currie Cup debut.

The Leopards suffered relegation during that Currie Cup season, so Van Wyk's seven appearances the following season were in the 2012 Currie Cup First Division. He failed to score any points as the Leopards finished fourth and suffered a semi-final defeat at the hands of the Eastern Province Kings.

With Van Wyk not being involved in the Varsity Cup for the first since 2008, he was part of the Leopards XV side that played in the 2013 Vodacom Cup. He played four times without scoring any tries.

=== Border Bulldogs ===
He joined East London-based side the Border Bulldogs for the 2013 Currie Cup First Division season and recaptured his try-scoring form as he ended the season as the Bulldogs' top scorer with five tries in twelve appearances, which included two tries in their match against the Griffons in Welkom.

=== Falcons ===
Serious financial problems at the Border Bulldogs at the end of 2013 saw a number of players leave the side, with a large number of players, which included Van Wyk, joining East Rand side the Falcons. Van Wyk played in all seven their matches during the 2014 Vodacom Cup competition and, despite switching from playing on the wing to outside centre for the first time in his senior career, he scored a further three tries, two of those in their 65–14 victory over the Limpopo Blue Bulls.
