= Victor Strand =

Victor Strand may refer to:

- Victor Strand (Fear the Walking Dead), a fictional character on Fear the Walking Dead
- Victor B. Strand, business executive of Toms International

== See also ==
- Victor Strand Kruger, athlete
