= Willie du Plessis (rugby union, born 1990) =

Netherlands international rugby union player

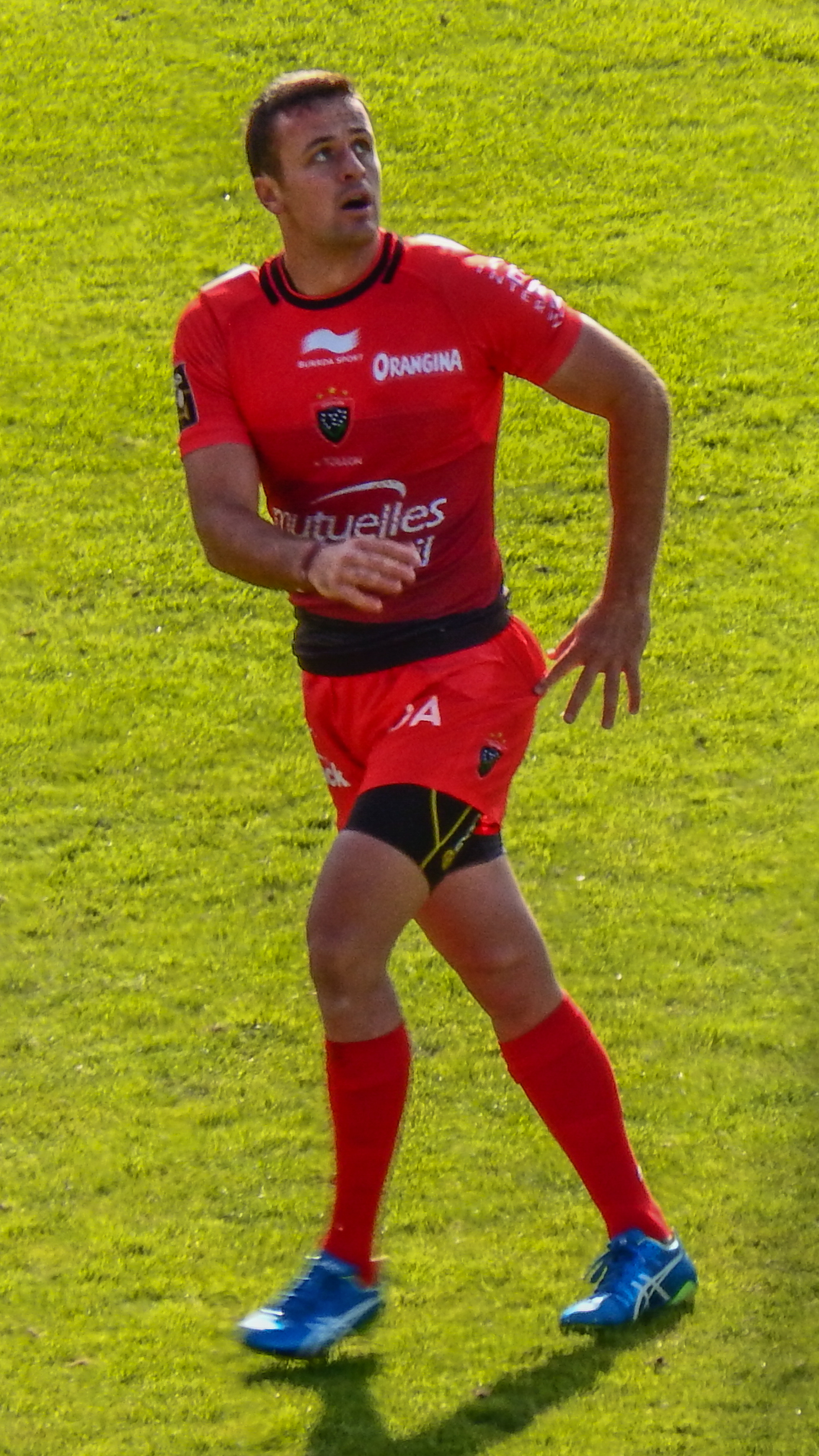
- Full name: Willem Nicolaas Frederik du Plessis
- Born: 5 June 1990 (age 36) Pretoria, South Africa
- Height: 1.85 m (6 ft 1 in)
- Weight: 93 kg (14 st 9 lb; 205 lb)
- School: Afrikaanse Hoër Seunskool
- University: University of Pretoria

Rugby union career
- Position: Fly-half
- Current team: Stade Montois
Youth career
- 2008: Blue Bulls
- 2009–2011: Sharks
- 2011: Blue Bulls
Amateur team(s)
Years	Team	Apps	(Points)
2012–2013	UP Tuks	12	(46)
Senior career
Years	Team	Apps	(Points)
2012	Blue Bulls	7	(86)
2013	Free State Cheetahs	9	(6)
2014	Golden Lions	10	(93)
2014–2015	Free State Cheetahs	12	(111)
2015	Cheetahs	8	(7)
2015	Toulon	7	(20)
2015–2019	Bayonne	68	(375)
2017	Montpellier	10	(110)
2019–2021	Biarritz	18	(119)
2021–	Mont-de-Marsan	98	(342)
- Correct as of 20 April 2025
International career
Years	Team	Apps	(Points)
2022-	Netherlands	5	(7)
- Correct as of 20 April 2025

Willem Nicolaas Frederik du Plessis (born 5 June 1990) is a South African-born Dutch international rugby union player, currently playing in France with the French Pro D2 side Mont-de-Marsan. His regular position is fly-half.

== Career ==
=== Youth ===
Du Plessis played for the Blue Bulls at the 2008 Under-18 Academy Week competition before moving to Durban to join the Sharks. He played for the Sharks U19 team in the 2009 Under-19 Provincial Championship and for the Sharks U21 team in the 2010 Under-21 Provincial Championship, scoring 96 points in twelve matches. He was named in the Sharks' squad for the 2011 Vodacom Cup competition, but failed to make an appearance. He made two more appearances for the Sharks in the 2011 Under-21 Provincial Championship, before returning to the Blue Bulls U21 team for the latter part of the competition, making a further four appearances.

=== Blue Bulls ===
Du Plessis was included in the Blue Bulls squad for the 2012 Vodacom Cup competition and made his first class debut against the Falcons, coming on as a half-time substitute and scoring a try within five minutes of his debut, as well as two conversions. He also appeared as a substitute in two of their remaining fixtures in the competition. He was once again included in their squad for the 2013 Vodacom Cup competition and made his first start for the Blue Bulls, once again against the Falcons, this time scoring seven conversions.

Du Plessis's next game in the competition came against the Limpopo Blue Bulls, with the Blue Bulls running out 110–0 victors. Du Plessis weighed in with two tries and fifteen conversions (missing just one attempt), scoring 40 points in one match, a Vodacom Cup record.

=== Free State Cheetahs ===
Du Plessis joined the Free State Cheetahs on a short-term deal for the 2013 Currie Cup Premier Division.

=== Golden Lions ===
Du Plessis signed a two-year deal with the Golden Lions, joining them in November 2013.

=== Return to Cheetahs ===
However, Du Plessis's time in Johannesburg was short-lived and he returned to Bloemfontein for the 2015 Super Rugby season, signing a contract until the end of 2016.

=== Toulon ===
In August 2015, Du Plessis joined French Top 14 side Toulon as a medical joker on a three-month loan deal.

=== Bayonne ===
Du Plessis joined Bayonne in November 2015 as a medical joker, before signing a full-time contract a month later, signing a three-year deal starting in the 2016–17 season.

=== Varsity Cup ===
Du Plessis also played Varsity Cup rugby for UP Tuks, making twelve appearances in 2012 and 2013.
