= Quinn Roux =

South African rugby union player (born 1990)

- Born: Quinn Roux; 30 October 1990 (age 36) Pretoria, South Africa
- Height: 1.98 m (6 ft 6 in)
- Weight: 122 kg (19 st 3 lb; 269 lb)
- School: Afrikaanse Hoër Seunskool

Rugby union career
- Position: Lock
- Current team: Bath
Senior career
Years	Team	Apps	(Points)
2012–2015	Leinster	21	(0)
2014–2015	→ Connacht (loan)	22	(5)
2015–2021	Connacht	84	(25)
2021–2022	Toulon	14	(5)
2022–	Bath	68	(15)
- Correct as of 1 May 2026
Provincial / State sides
Years	Team	Apps	(Points)
2011–2012	Western Province	23	(5)
- Correct as of 17 May 2012
Super Rugby
Years	Team	Apps	(Points)
2012	Stormers	4	(0)
- Correct as of 2 September 2014
International career
Years	Team	Apps	(Points)
2016–2020	Ireland	16	(15)
- Correct as of 5 December 2020

Quinn Roux (born 30 October 1990) is a rugby union player who plays for Bath in the Premiership Rugby and formerly the Ireland national team. Born in South Africa, he qualified for Ireland through residency, made his international debut in 2016 and has won 16 caps. In 2018 he became an Irish citizen. He primarily plays as a lock.

Before his move to Ireland, Roux played rugby in his birthplace, lining out for the Stormers in Super Rugby and Western Province in the Currie Cup and Vodacom Cup.

== Club career ==
=== Early career ===
Roux started playing for Western Province in 2011, and was a member of the side which won the 2012 Vodacom Cup, the team's first ever win in the competition. Roux's performances for Western Province led to a call up for Super Rugby side, the Stormers. He made his Super Rugby debut on 2 June 2012, replacing Eben Etzebeth in the 51st minute of 19–14 win over the Bulls.

=== Leinster ===
In June 2012 it was announced that Roux was moving to Irish provincial team Leinster on a one-year deal. He joined the squad for the 2012–13 season. Roux played in nine games in the 2012–13 Pro12, starting in seven of these. Roux did not feature for Leinster in the 2012–13 Heineken Cup as the team was eliminated in the pool stages. After the team were knocked down to the 2012–13 European Challenge Cup, however, Roux featured in each of Leinster's matches. He made his European debut as a replacement against London Wasps in the quarter-final, before also coming on as a replacement against Biarritz. Roux then started for Leinster in the Challenge Cup final against Stade Français, which saw Leinster crowned champions. He extended his contract with Leinster in March 2013, signing a two-year extension to the original deal.

In the following season, Roux made seven appearances in the Pro12, with all but one of his appearances coming as starts. On 12 October 2013, Roux made his Heineken Cup debut. He came on as a replacement in the province's win over the Ospreys. Roux also made a replacement appearance against Castres the following week.

=== Connacht ===
Ahead the 2014–15 season, it was announced Roux was joining Connacht, another Irish province, on a loan deal to last until 31 December 2014. The move to Connacht saw him reunited with his former Western Province teammate Danie Poolman. Roux made his Connacht debut on 6 September 2014, when he started against Newport Gwent Dragons in the first game of the 2014–15 Pro12, and played the full 80 minutes in a Connacht victory. Roux started the game against his parent club Leinster on 19 September 2014, as Connacht pulled off an unlikely victory over their Irish rivals.

Roux continued to feature regularly for Connacht, and extended his loan deal for the remainder of the season, taking him to the end of his contract with Leinster. It was announced in January 2015 that at the end of his contract with Leinster, Roux would join Connacht permanently, with the second row signing a deal to take him up to the summer of 2017.

=== Toulon ===
On 14 June 2021, it was confirmed that Roux left Ireland to join French giants Toulon in the Top 14 competition ahead of the 2021-22 season.

=== Bath ===
On 27 June 2022, Roux moved to the UK as he signs for English side Bath in the Premiership Rugby for the 2022-23 season.

== International career ==
Roux debuted for Ireland in the second test in their 2016 series against South Africa.
