= Reniel Hugo =

South African rugby union player

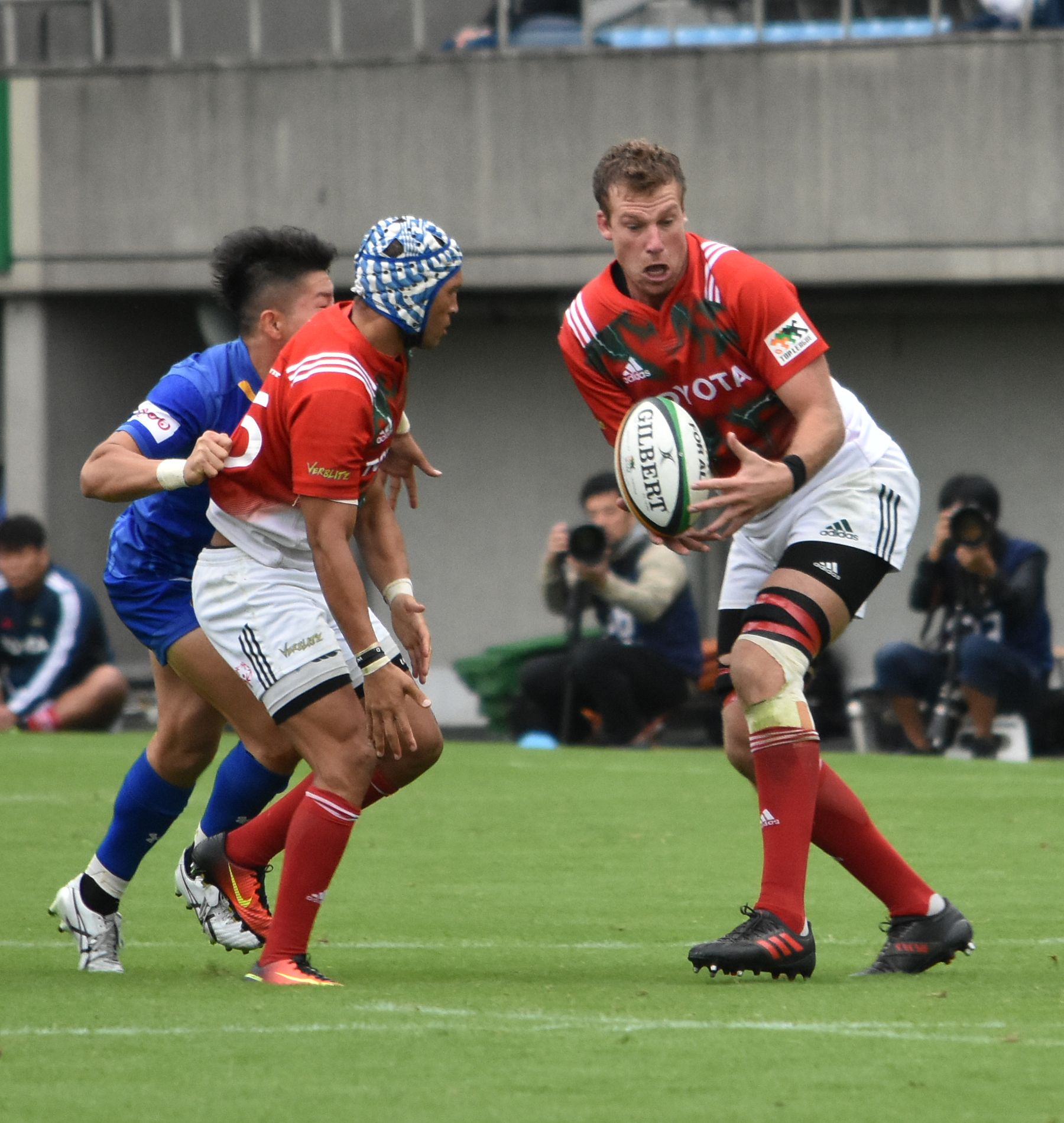
- Hugo in 2018
- Full name: Daniel Pieter Hugo
- Born: 19 July 1990 (age 36) Bellville, South Africa
- Height: 1.97 m (6 ft 5 1/2 in)
- Weight: 109 kg (17 st 2 lb; 240 lb)
- School: Paul Roos Gymnasium, Stellenbosch
- University: Stellenbosch University
- Notable relative: Niel Hugo (father)

Rugby union career
- Position: Lock / Flanker / No 8
- Current team: Sharks / Sharks (Currie Cup)
Youth career
- 2008–2011: Western Province
Amateur team(s)
Years	Team	Apps	(Points)
2010–2013	Maties	19	(15)
2014–2015	UP Tuks	15	(25)
Senior career
Years	Team	Apps	(Points)
2011	Western Province	2	(0)
2014–2015	Blue Bulls	7	(10)
2015–2017	Free State XV	14	(15)
2015–2017	Free State Cheetahs	27	(10)
2016–2018	Cheetahs	29	(10)
2018–2020	Toyota Verblitz	13	(0)
2020	Cheetahs	0	(0)
2020–2021	Free State Cheetahs	5	(0)
2020–	Sharks	20	(20)
2021–	Sharks (Currie Cup)	11	(5)
- Correct as of 29 September 2022
International career
Years	Team	Apps	(Points)
2008	South Africa Schools Elite squad		
2013	South African Universities	1	(0)
- Correct as of 22 April 2018

Daniel Pieter "Reniel" Hugo (born 19 July 1990) is a South African professional rugby union player for Sharks (Currie Cup) in the Currie Cup in South Africa. He mainly plays as a lock, but can also play as a loose forward and flanker.

== Career ==
=== Western Province / Maties ===
Hugo's first provincial selection came in 2008, when he was included in the Western Province side that played at the Under-18 Craven Week competition (the premier high school rugby union competition in South Africa) which was held in Pretoria. He was also included in a South Africa Schools Elite squad named after the tournament.

After finishing high school, Hugo joined the Western Province Academy and represented the Western Province U19s during the 2009 Under-19 Provincial Championship.

In 2010, Hugo was named in the Maties squad for the 2010 Varsity Cup competition but failed to make any appearances in the competition. He was a first-choice lock for Western Province U21 during the 2010 Under-21 Provincial Championship, starting thirteen matches and scoring two tries as his side won the title, beating Blue Bulls U21 43–32 in the final held in Durban, with Hugo playing the entire 80 minutes of the final.

Hugo had his first taste of Varsity Cup action in 2011, starting two of Maties' matches during the competition. He also made his first-class debut in February 2011, when he started Western Province's 2011 Vodacom Cup match against the Golden Lions in a match that ended in an 18-all draw. He also played against the Falcons in Kempton Park the following week in an 86-14 win. In the latter half of 2011, he once again played for Western Province U21s in the Under-21 Provincial Championship, making 12 appearances as they reached the semi-final of the competition before being eliminated by the Sharks U21.

Hugo was a key player for Maties in the Varsity Cup competitions in 2012 and 2013, helping them reach the final for successive seasons but ending up losing on both occasions. In 2013, he scored a try in each of their first three matches of the season to set them on their way to topping the log with seven wins out of seven before eventually losing to UP Tuks in the final.

=== Blue Bulls / UP Tuks ===
Hugo made the move to Pretoria to join defending Varsity Cup champions UP Tuks for the 2014 Varsity Cup season. He started all seven of their matches and scored tries against Wits and UFS Shimlas, but could not help Tuks into the play-offs, finishing in sixth spot on the log.

After his side's elimination from the Varsity Cup, he was included in the Blue Bulls' squad for the 2014 Vodacom Cup. He made his Blue Bulls debut in the trans-Jukskei clash against the Golden Lions, coming on as a second-half replacement to help his side to a 22–20 victory. He also played off the bench in their next match against the Leopards XV in Leeudoringstad and scored his first senior try in the match to help them to a 30–26 victory. Another appearance off the bench against the Falcons was followed by his first start in Blue Bulls colours in a 114–0 victory against the Limpopo Blue Bulls in their final match in the group stages. The Blue Bulls finished third in the Northern Section of the Vodacom Cup to qualify to the quarter finals; Hugo started their 22–21 victory in the quarter final against the Free State XV and played off the bench in the semi-final, as the Golden Lions reversed the result from earlier in the campaign, winning 16–15 to eliminate the Blue Bulls from the competition.

Hugo started all eight of UP Tuks' matches during the 2015 Varsity Cup, scoring three tries. They topped the log after the regular season to qualify for the semi-final, but lost 28–29 to the NWU Pukke in Pretoria.

Hugo's personal contributions didn't go unnoticed, however, and he was named to the Varsity Cup Dream Team at the conclusion of the tournament. He was also appointed as captain of the side, which played one match against the South Africa Under-20s in Stellenbosch.

Hugo also made one further appearance for the Blue Bulls in the 2015 Vodacom Cup, helping them to a 44-0 victory against Namibian side Welwitschias in Windhoek.

=== Free State Cheetahs ===
At the conclusion of the 2015 Varsity Cup, it was announced that Hugo would join Bloemfontein-based side the Free State Cheetahs on a deal until the end of 2016.

== Personal ==
Hugo's father, Niel Hugo, was also a rugby union player; he played in two test matches for South Africa in 1989 and made 146 appearances for Western Province in the 1980s and 1990s.
