= Peet Marais =

South African rugby union player

- Full name: Peet Celliers Marais
- Born: 31 October 1990 (age 36) Welkom, South Africa
- Height: 1.99 m (6 ft 6 1/2 in)
- Weight: 114 kg (17 st 13 lb; 251 lb)
- School: Welkom Gimnasium
- Notable relative: Jandré Marais (brother)

Rugby union career
- Position: Lock
- Current team: Brive
Youth career
- 2007–2008: Griffons
- 2009–2011: Sharks
Senior career
Years	Team	Apps	(Points)
2011–2014	Sharks (Currie Cup)	49	(5)
2014–present	Brive	43	(5)
- Correct as of 12 May 2014
International career
Years	Team	Apps	(Points)
2008	South Africa Under-18 Elite Squad		
2010	South Africa Under-20		
- Correct as of 12 May 2014

Peet Celliers Marais is a South African rugby union footballer. His playing position is lock.

== Career ==
After playing for local Welkom-based side Griffons at various youth level, he joined Durban-based side Sharks at the start of 2009. He made his first class debut during the 2011 Vodacom Cup competition against the Blue Bulls and made 49 appearances for them over the next four seasons.

He was included in the Sharks' Super Rugby squad in 2013 and 2014, but failed to make a single Super Rugby appearance.

=== Brive ===
In May 2014, French media outlets reported that he signed a two-year deal with French side CA Brive for the 2014–2015 season. This was confirmed by the club on 2 July 2014.

== Personal ==
He is the brother of former Sharks player Jandré Marais.
