= Franna du Toit =

South African rugby union player

- Full name: Francois Cornelius du Toit
- Born: 16 March 1990 (age 36) Vryburg, South Africa
- Height: 1.83 m (6 ft 0 in)
- Weight: 93 kg (14 st 9 lb; 205 lb)
- School: Grey College, Bloemfontein
- University: University of the Free State

Rugby union career
- Position: Fly-half / Utility back
- Current team: Griffons
Youth career
- 2007–2011: Free State Cheetahs
Amateur team(s)
Years	Team	Apps	(Points)
2010–2014	UFS Shimlas	21	(54)
Senior career
Years	Team	Apps	(Points)
2010–2011	Free State Cheetahs	1	(5)
2013–present	Griffons	29	(153)
- Correct as of 23 July 2016
International career
Years	Team	Apps	(Points)
2008	South Africa Under-18 Elite Squad		
2008	South Africa Schools		
2012	South Africa Students	2	(7)
- Correct as of 10 November 2015

Francois Cornelius du Toit (born 16 March 1990) is a South African professional rugby union player, currently playing with the Griffons. His regular position is fly-half, but he can play in a variety of backline positions, such as inside centre, wing or fullback.

== Career ==
=== Youth / UFS Shimlas / Free State (2007–13) ===
Du Toit attended Grey College in Bloemfontein, where he earned call-ups to represent the Free State at youth tournaments. He represented them at the 2007 Under-18 Academy Week held in Pietersburg and also at the Under-18 Craven Week – the premier high school rugby union tournament in South Africa – held in Pretoria in 2008. He was then included in a South African Under-18 Elite Squad and then earned a selection to be the starting fly-half for the South African Schools team that played against a South African Schools Academy side in August 2008. He was also included in the Free State U19 squad that competed at the 2008 Under-19 Provincial Championship.

In 2009, he was included in the UFS Shimlas side that participated in the 2009 Varsity Cup, although he failed to make an appearance. However, he made two appearances for the side in the 2010 Varsity Cup, appearing in their final match of the regular season against UJ and in the semi-final loss to UCT Ikey Tigers, scoring 17 points in the process. Du Toit was also named in Free State's squad for the 2011 Vodacom Cup, but – despite being named on the bench for their match against the SWD Eagles – failed to make any appearances. In the latter half of the year, he represented the Free State U21 side in the 2010 Under-21 Provincial Championship. He appeared in all thirteen of their matches in the competition and was the joint-top scorer for the Shimlas along with George Whitehead with 125 points. He scored 35 points in a 110–10 victory over Boland U21 in Round Ten of the competition, scoring one try and kicking 15 out of 16 conversions. He nearly matched that tally in their semi-final match against Western Province U21, scoring 29 points in a 49–49 draw. However, it was not enough to put the Free State U21s in the final, with Western Province progressing by virtue of scoring more tries in the match.

Du Toit appeared in seven of the UFS Shimlas' eight matches during the 2011 Varsity Cup, helping them to the semi-finals of the competition, where they lost 20–57 to eventual champions the UCT Ikey Tigers. He made his first class debut on 2 April 2011, coming on as a replacement in the Free State XV's match against the Golden Lions in the 2011 Vodacom Cup competition. Just five minutes after coming on, Du Toit scored his first senior try, although he missed the resultant conversion and another one later in the match as his side suffered a 19–37 defeat. He made eight appearances for the Free State Under-21s in the 2011 Under-21 Provincial Championship, scoring 26 points in a disappointing season as the side failed to reach the semi-finals, finishing in fifth place on the log.

Du Toit continued to represent UFS Shimlas in the Varsity Cup in 2012 and 2013, making five appearances in each of those seasons. In 2012, he was also included in a South African Students team that played matches against the Eastern Province Kings and Namibia

=== Griffons (2013–) ===
In 2013, Du Toit joined Welkom-based side Griffons during the 2013 Currie Cup First Division season. He made his debut in the Currie Cup competition in their Round Ten match against the Border Bulldogs, helping them to a 24–19 victory. He made his first start the following week against the Leopards in a match that also saw him score his first points, kicking four conversions in a 33–40 defeat. He also started their matches against the SWD Eagles and the Boland Cavaliers. Despite contributing 20 points (kicking 10 conversions), he could not help the Griffons qualify for the semi-finals, finishing in sixth spot on the log.

After his final season of Varsity Cup rugby with the UFS Shimlas in 2014, he joined the Griffons on a full-time basis. He made five appearances for them in the 2014 Vodacom Cup, scoring 21 points. Due to a change in the format of the Currie Cup for 2014, the Griffons then has to participate in the 2014 Currie Cup qualification series. Du Toit made two appearances in this competition; his 17 points in their season-opener against Boland Cavaliers proved decisive in a 27–25 victory and he also started their next match against the SWD Eagles, but was forced off with a knee injury that kept him out of the remainder of the qualification competition. The Griffons finished in third place, failing to qualify for the 2014 Currie Cup Premier Division, instead playing in the 2014 Currie Cup First Division. Du Toit made his comeback in this competition and made six appearances, scoring 29 points. The Griffons finished in second spot on the log to qualify for the semi-finals. Du Toit came on as a late replacement in their 45–43 semi-final victory over the SWD Eagles and was also named on the bench for the final, but he wasn't used as the Griffons beat the Falcons 23–21 to win their first trophy for six years.

Du Toit made three appearances in the 2015 Vodacom Cup as the Griffons finished sixth in the Northern Section to miss out on a semi-final spot. A further three appearances followed in the 2015 Currie Cup qualification series, but the Griffons finished fifth, once again failing to secure a spot in the Premier Division. Du Toit made five starts in the 2015 Currie Cup First Division as the Griffons attempted to retain the title they won in 2014. They finished in third spot, but lost 40–47 to the SWD Eagles in the semi-final. Du Toit scored 31 points, the fifth-highest in the competition, during his five appearances.
