= Hannes Snyman =

South African rugby union player

- Full name: Johannes Jurgens Snyman
- Born: 29 March 1989 (age 37) Kroonstad, South Africa
- Height: 1.84 m (6 ft 1/2 in)
- Weight: 105 kg (16 st 7 lb; 231 lb)
- School: Afrikaanse Hoërskool Kroonstad

Rugby union career
- Position: Hooker
Youth career
- 2005–2007: Griffons
- 2008–2010: Sharks
Senior career
Years	Team	Apps	(Points)
2010	Sharks (Currie Cup)	3	(0)
2011–2014	Griffons	30	(5)
2010–2014	Total	33	(5)
- Correct as of 17 October 2014

Johannes Jurgens Snyman (born 29 March 1989 in Kroonstad, South Africa) is a former South African rugby union player that played for the Sharks and the Griffons between 2010 and 2014. His regular position is hooker.

== Career ==
=== Youth ===
He was selected in the Griffons' Under-16 side for the Grant Khomo Week tournament in 2005. In 2006 and 2007, he represented them at Under-18 level at the Craven Week tournaments, also captaining the side in 2007.

He then moved to Durban to link up with the Sharks. He progressed through their age groups, playing for the Sharks U19 side in the 2008 Under-19 Provincial Championship and for the Sharks U21 side in the Under-21 Provincial Championships in 2009 and 2010.

=== Sharks ===
His breakthrough to the senior side came during 2010, when he made three appearances off the bench for the Sharks XV in the 2010 Vodacom Cup competition. After making his debut on 26 February 2010 in their 69–8 victory over the Border Bulldogs in Durban, he also appeared in their matches against Western Province and the Blue Bulls.

Those three appearances turned out to be the only ones he made for the Durban-based side as he failed to be included in a Currie Cup squad for the Sharks and made no appearances for them during the 2011 Vodacom Cup.

=== Griffons ===
He returned to the Griffons for the 2011 Currie Cup First Division season. He made his Griffons senior debut (and Currie Cup debut) by playing off the bench in their 21–26 defeat to the Border Bulldogs in East London. He made his first start two weeks later in their match against the Falcons and made a total of six appearances during the competition. A further six appearances followed in the 2012 Vodacom Cup competition and he made eleven appearances during the 2012 Currie Cup First Division, also scoring his first senior try against the Eastern Province Kings in Port Elizabeth.

He didn't play any matches for them in 2013, but returned to action in 2014 by making four appearances in the 2014 Currie Cup qualification tournament as the Griffons failed to qualify for the 2014 Currie Cup Premier Division. Instead, they played in the 2014 Currie Cup First Division competition. Snyman made three appearances to help the Griffons reach the final. However, he was an unused substitute in the final where the Griffons won the match 23–21 to win their first trophy for six years.

He retired from rugby at the end of 2014 to pursue a career in farming.
