= Strand Kruger =

South African rugby union footballer

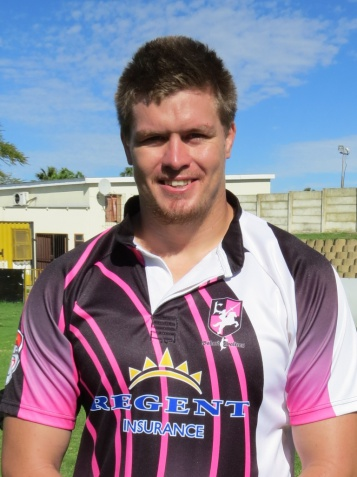
- Full name: Victor Eric Kruger
- Born: 19 January 1989 (age 37) Welkom, South Africa
- Height: 1.99 m (6 ft 6 1/2 in)
- Weight: 114 kg (17 st 13 lb; 251 lb)
- School: Hoërskool Strand, Strand
- University: North-West University

Rugby union career
- Position: Lock
- Current team: Rustenburg Impala
Youth career
- 2007: Boland Cavaliers
- 2008–2010: Leopards
Amateur team(s)
Years	Team	Apps	(Points)
2009–2013	NWU Pukke	28	(5)
2015–present	Rustenburg Impala	3	(0)
Senior career
Years	Team	Apps	(Points)
2009–2013	Leopards	14	(5)
2013	→ Griquas	2	(0)
2014	Boland Cavaliers	10	(10)
- Correct as of 7 April 2015

Victor Eric 'Strand' Kruger (born 19 January 1989 in Welkom) is a South African rugby union player, currently playing with Rustenburg-based club side Impala. His regular position is lock.

== Career ==
=== Youth and Varsity Cup ===
He was part of the Boland U19 squad that played in the 2007 Under-19 Provincial Championship competition. He then moved to Potchefstroom, where he joined the Leopards, as well as university side NWU Pukke. He was included in the Leopards U19 squad for the 2008 Under-19 Provincial Championship competition and in the Leopards U21 squad for the 2009 and 2010 Under-21 Provincial Championship competitions.

He also played for – and captained – the NWU Pukke in the Varsity Cup competition, representing them from 2009 to 2013.

=== Leopards ===
Kruger was named as a reserve for the Leopards for their 2009 Currie Cup Premier Division match against Western Province, but failed to come on as a substitute. His first class debut only came in 2011, when he started in the Pampas XV v Leopards match in the 2011 Vodacom Cup. Due to his involvement in the Varsity Cup, he only made a further two appearances in that competition, both in 2011. He broke into the team's Currie Cup team for the 2012 Currie Cup First Division. He made his Currie Cup debut in their 68–35 victory against the SWD Eagles in Potchefstroom and scored his first try in the return match in George seven weeks later.

=== Griquas ===
He joined Griquas in 2013 on a short-term contract, following a series of injuries to Griquas locks.

=== Boland Cavaliers ===
He joined Wellington-based side Boland Cavaliers prior to the 2014 season.

=== Rustenburg Impala ===
In 2015, he moved to Rustenburg for work reasons and joined the defending SARU Community Cup champions, Rustenburg Impala.
