= Sidney Tobias =

South African rugby union player

- Full name: Sidney McNeil Tobias
- Born: 20 March 1989 (age 37) Caledon, South Africa
- Height: 1.76 m (5 ft 9 1/2 in)
- Weight: 101 kg (15 st 13 lb; 223 lb)
- School: Paul Roos Gymnasium, Stellenbosch
- University: University of Pretoria
- Notable relative: Errol Tobias (father)

Rugby union career
- Position: Hooker
- Current team: Bulls/Blue Bulls; Rugby ATL
Youth career
- 2005–2010: Western Province
Amateur team(s)
Years	Team	Apps	(Points)
2013–2014	UP Tuks	4	(5)
Senior career
Years	Team	Apps	(Points)
2010–2012	Western Province	22	(10)
2012	SWD Eagles	13	(0)
2013–2014	Blue Bulls	8	(5)
2015–2016	Griquas	12	(0)
2017	Zebre	4	(0)
2021–	Bulls	0	(0)
2021–	Blue Bulls	4	(0)
2023–	Rugby ATL		
2024- Present	Boland Cavaliers		
- Correct as of 22 June 2023

Sidney McNeil Tobias (born 20 March 1989) is a South African rugby union player who plays for the Bulls in the United Rugby Championship and for the Blue Bulls in the Currie Cup. He also plays for Rugby ATL in Major League Rugby (MLR) in the U.S. His regular position is hooker.

== Career ==
=== Youth ===
Tobias went to school at Paul Roos Gymnasium in Stellenbosch, where he earned a selection to play for the Western Province side that participated at the Grant Khomo Week in 2005. He progressed further through the youth structures at Western Province, also playing for their Under-18 sides at the Academy Week in 2006 and the Craven Week competition in 2007.

In joined their academy, the Western Province Rugby Institute, when he finished school at the end of 2007. He represented the Western Province U19s in the 2008 Under-19 Provincial Championship and the Under-21s in 2009 and 2010.

=== Western Province ===
Tobias was included in Western Province's squad for the 2009 Vodacom Cup, but didn't make any appearances. His first class debut came during the 2010 Vodacom Cup, coming on in their match against Boland Cavaliers in Bredasdorp and also played the following match against the Sharks XV.

After playing at Under-21 level for the remainder of 2010, he returned to the Vodacom Cup side in 2011. His first start came in their home match against the Golden Lions in an 18–18 draw. In his second start the following week, he scored his first senior try, the first for Western Province in a comprehensive 86–14 victory over the Falcons in Kempton Park. He was the first-choice hooker for the remainder of their Vodacom Cup campaign, starting a total of seven matches and appearing as a substitute on two occasions as Western Province reached the quarter-finals before losing to the Sharks XV. He played in a compulsory friendly match against Boland Cavaliers prior to the 2011 Currie Cup Premier Division season, but didn't feature in the competition proper.

Tobias once again played the entire Vodacom Cup campaign in 2012, playing in all seven regular season matches (starting six of those) as Western Province topped the Southern Section. He started their quarter-final match against the Golden Lions, helping them to a 58–34 victory and their semi-final match against the Pumas, scoring Western Province's first try in a 33–20 victory that saw his side reach their first ever final in this competition. He also started the final against Griquas in Kimberley, playing the entire 80 minutes as Western Province ran out 20–18 winners to win the title for the first time.

=== SWD Eagles ===
The 2012 Vodacom Cup final turned out to be Tobias' last in Western Province colours, instead opting to move to fellow Western Cape side SWD Eagles prior to the 2012 Currie Cup First Division. He made his Currie Cup debut in Round Two of the competition in a 15–38 defeat to eventual champions the Eastern Province Kings in Port Elizabeth. He played in all twelve of their remaining matches in the competition, making four starts but generally playing off the bench as a second-choice hooker to Hansie van Dyk. The SWD Eagles eventually finished the season in fifth position, losing out on a play-off spot in the process.

=== Blue Bulls / UP Tuks ===
In 2013, Tobias made the move north to Pretoria to join the Blue Bulls and their affiliated university side, UP Tuks. He made just one appearance for UP Tuks in the 2013 Varsity Cup, playing off the bench in their match against NWU Pukke in Potchefstroom. He scored a try within two minutes of his introduction and almost helped UP Tuks turn around the 24–0 half-time score, with the game ending in a 26–23 victory to NWU. He also made one appearance for the Blue Bulls in the 2013 Vodacom Cup in a loss to the Leopards XV in Pretoria.

Tobias had more game time in 2014, making three appearances for UP Tuks in the 2014 Varsity Cup before featuring in seven matches for the Blue Bulls in the 2014 Vodacom Cup, starting five of those and scoring his third first class try in their match against the Leopards in Leeudoringstad.

=== Griquas ===
Tobias remained overlooked for the Blue Bulls' Currie Cup side, however, and in October 2014 it was announced that he would move to Kimberley to join Griquas for the 2015 season.

=== Zebre ===
Tobias moved to Italian Pro12 side Zebre at the start of 2017. He made just four appearances as a replacement during the 2016–17 Pro12, playing a total of 54 minutes, and was released at the end of the season.

== Personal ==
He is the son of former Springbok fly-half Errol Tobias.
