= Danie Poolman =

South African rugby union player

- Born: Daniel Johannes George Poolman; 10 March 1989 (age 37) Pretoria, South Africa
- Height: 1.89 m (6 ft 2 1/2 in)
- Weight: 103 kg (16 st 3 lb; 227 lb)
- School: Paul Roos Gymnasium, Stellenbosch

Rugby union career
- Position: Wing
Provincial / State sides
Years	Team	Apps	(Points)
2010–2012	Western Province	25	(35)
2012–2017	Connacht	71	(105)
- Correct as of 19 July 2016
Super Rugby
Years	Team	Apps	(Points)
2011–2012	Stormers	10	(5)
- Correct as of 29 July 2012

Danie Poolman (born 10 March 1989) is a South African former professional rugby union player. He played for Irish provincial side Connacht Rugby in the Pro12 until 2017 followed by a spell playing amateur rugby in Dublin with Bective Rangers in the Leinster League. He primarily plays on the wing or in the centre. Born in Pretoria, he formerly played for Western Province in South Africa's Currie Cup, and Super Rugby side the Stormers. Qualified to play for Ireland by residence since 2015, Poolman indicated his intention to do so.

== Career ==
=== Youth and Varsity rugby ===
Poolman played schoolboy rugby for Paul Roos Gymnasium and was included in the Western Province Under-18 side at the 2007 Craven Week tournament. Western Province progressed to the unofficial final match against the Free State Cheetahs, but lost the match 52–3. He played for the Western Province U19 side in 2008 and for their Under-21 sides in 2009 and 2010. He finished as the top try scorer in the 2010 Under-21 Provincial Championship competition, scoring 17 tries in just 14 appearances.

He also played Varsity Cup rugby for Maties in the 2010 Varsity Cup competition. He started in all nine of Maties' matches in the competition and scored six tries, including a try early in the second half of the final, helping Maties beat local rivals UCT Ikey Tigers 17–14 to clinch the Varsity Cup for a third consecutive season.

=== Western Province and Stormers ===
Poolman was then included in the Western Province side for the 2010 Vodacom Cup competition. He made his first class debut for them by coming on as a substitute in their match against SWD Eagles on 10 April 2010. His first start came in the Quarter-final match against the Blue Bulls.

Despite not playing any Currie Cup rugby for Western Province, Poolman was included in the Stormers squad prior to the 2011 Super Rugby season and made his Super Rugby debut by starting the Stormers' opening match of the season against the Lions at Newlands Stadium in Cape Town. He made eight appearances in that competition, scoring his first senior try in the return leg against the Lions in Johannesburg in a 33–19 win.

He eventually made his Currie Cup debut during the 2011 Currie Cup season in Western Province's match against Griquas and made 13 appearances in the competition, scoring 4 tries. He made just two appearances for the Stormers in the 2012 Super Rugby season, with Gio Aplon and Gerhard van den Heever being preferred to him in the starting line-up. Instead, he dropped down to the Western Province side for the 2012 Vodacom Cup competition, scoring two tries in eight starts.

=== Connacht ===
In June 2012, it was announced that he had been released from his Western Province contract to join Irish team Connacht ahead of the 2012–2013 season, signing on a three-year deal.

Poolman made his debut for Connacht in the 2012–13 Pro12 as a replacement against the Ospreys on 27 October 2012. He made his first start in the team's next Pro12 game, against Benetton Treviso on November, and also scored his first try for the side. Poolman made his European debut for Connacht on 7 December 2012 against Biarritz in the 2012–13 Heineken Cup. He played in three of the team's Heineken Cup matches in his debut season, and made 16 Pro12 appearances, scoring 5 tries. He left Connacht at the end of the 2016-17 season
