= Gary van Aswegen =

South African rugby union player

- Full name: Gary Jacques van Aswegen
- Born: 18 February 1990 (age 36) Pretoria, South Africa
- Height: 1.78 m (5 ft 10 in)
- Weight: 88 kg (13 st 12 lb; 194 lb)
- School: Standerton Hoërskool, Standerton
- University: Stellenbosch University

Rugby union career
- Position: Fly-half
Youth career
- 2006–2008: Pumas
- 2009–2011: Western Province
Senior career
Years	Team	Apps	(Points)
2010–2014	Western Province	20	(124)
2011–2014	Stormers	15	(30)
2014–2015	Eastern Province Kings	11	(40)
2010–2015	Total	46	(194)
- Correct as of 4 January 2016

Gary Jacques van Aswegen (born 18 February 1990) is a South African former rugby union player that played as a fly-half throughout his career. He represented Western Province in the domestic Currie Cup and Vodacom Cup competitions between 2010 and 2014 and the Stormers in Super Rugby from 2011 to 2013. He also played for the Eastern Province Kings in 2014 and 2015. He retired after the 2015 season, aged 25.

== Rugby career ==
=== Youth ===
Van Aswegen was included in a number of youth sides for local province side the Pumas while playing rugby for Hoërskool Standerton. He represented them at the 2006 Under-16 Grant Khomo Week tournament, the 2007 Under-18 Academy Week tournament and the 2008 Under-18 Craven Week tournament. He was named Player of the Day on the second matchday of the competition after scoring a kick in the final minute of their match against Western Province to secure a 19–17 victory for the team from Mpumalanga. He was then named in the northern Under–18 Elite squad after the tournament.

In 2009, Van Aswegen moved to Cape Town to join Western Province. He played for the Western Province U19 side during the 2009 Under-19 Provincial Championship and earned an inclusion in the South African Under-20 side that played their Argentinean counterparts in 2010. He also joined a training for the South African Under-20s prior to the 2010 IRB Junior World Championship, but failed to make the final squad.

Van Aswegen started in thirteen matches for the Western Province U21 side during the 2010 Under-21 Provincial Championship, scoring 207 points and easily finishing as the top scorer in the competition, 41 points ahead of second-placed Marnitz Boshoff of the Blue Bulls U21. He was also largely responsible for Western Province winning the competition, scoring 23 points in their 43–32 victory over the Blue Bulls at Kings Park Stadium, Durban.

=== Western Province / Stormers ===
In addition to his points-scoring exploits for the Under-21 side, Van Aswegen also made his first class debut in September 2010. He came on as a substitute in Western Province's 2010 Currie Cup Premier Division match away to his former side, the Pumas and scored three conversions in the match, the first a mere two minutes after coming on. He made his home debut against Griquas, once again coming on as a second-half substitute and scoring one conversion.

In 2011, with just the two first class games under his belt, Van Aswegen also earned his inclusion in the Stormers squad for the 2011 Super Rugby season. With first-choice fly-half Peter Grant only recently having returned from playing Top League rugby with Kobelco Steelers, coach Allister Coetzee decided to start Van Aswegen in the Stormers' opening match of the season against the Lions. Van Aswegen kicked three penalties before being replaced by Grant just after the hour mark as the Stormers ran out 19–16 winners. He played off the bench the following week against the Cheetahs in a 21–15 victory, but he was mainly an unused substitute for the next few weeks and even dropped down to Western Province's Vodacom Cup squad for their match against Griquas. He made one more Super Rugby appearance in 2011, starting their return match against the Lions in Johannesburg and scoring an early penalty before suffering a medial knee injury in the 13th minute, which ruled him out of the remainder of the competition.

Van Aswegen returned from his knee injury during the 2011 Currie Cup Premier Division competition to start their match against Griquas, scoring sixteen points in a 26–26 draw, but was once again forced to limp off in the final minute of the match. He once again suffered a tear in the same ligament as before, ruling him out of rugby for the remainder of 2011.

Van Aswegen recovered in time for the start of the 2012 Super Rugby season and started the first two matches of the campaign with Peter Grant once again only returning from Japan shortly before the start of the season. He faced his first international side in Super Rugby with the visit of the Hurricanes on the opening day and contributed one drop goal in a 39–26 win, with Joe Pietersen having taken over the main kicking duties. The second match was against Durban-based side the Sharks, with the Stormers securing a narrow 15–12 win. One more appearance off the bench followed in their match against the Blues, but the injury curse struck again, with an ankle injury picked up during training ruling Van Aswegen out for the remainder of the season. He returned in August 2012 to play in one match in the 2012 Currie Cup Premier Division competition against the Sharks before playing some club rugby for Maties in the Western Province Super League to regain some match fitness. After one more Currie Cup appearance against Griquas, yet another knee injury ended his 2012 campaign.

In 2013, Van Aswegen put his injury problems behind him and, after playing three matches in the 2013 Vodacom Cup competition and scoring 27 points, he joined up with the Stormers side once more. He made nine appearances during the 2013 Super Rugby season, contributing 15 points with the boot. A further four appearances followed during the 2013 Currie Cup Premier Division competition, with Van Aswegen scoring 22 points before another knee injury saw him miss the rest of the season.

At the start of the 2014 Super Rugby season, Van Aswegen found him behind Peter Grant, Demetri Catrakilis and Kurt Coleman in the pecking order at the Stormers. While being included in their squad, he dropped down to the Vodacom Cup squad for the 2014 Vodacom Cup. He started seven out of their eight matches in the competition, contributing 38 points. He also scored his first ever first class try in their match against Western Cape neighbours, the SWD Eagles. In June 2014, he was part of a Western Province side that played matches against Kenya and Namibia, captaining them in the latter match.

=== Eastern Province Kings ===
In June 2014, the Eastern Province Kings announced that Van Aswegen would join them on a one-month trial prior to the 2014 Currie Cup Premier Division competition. He successfully concluded the trial and signed a deal with the Port Elizabeth-based side until 2016.

Van Aswegen started eight matches for the Eastern Province Kings during the 2014 Currie Cup. He made his debut for his new side against his former side, Western Province, in a 16–35 defeat. He scored his first points for them in their next match, a 19–60 defeat to the Golden Lions, and also contributed 6 points in their final match of the season, a 26–25 win over the Pumas after nine successive defeat earlier in the competition. He finished the season with 30 points, the second-highest by an Eastern Province Kings player behind Scott van Breda and sixteenth overall.

Van Aswegen played in three matches during the 2015 Vodacom Cup – scoring in each of those three matches for a total of 10 points – before he once again suffered a recurrence of his knee injury in their match against the Free State XV. The injury ruled him out of the remainder of the 2015 Vodacom Cup competition, plus the entire 2015 Currie Cup Premier Division.

=== Retirement ===
Despite linked with a move to Kimberley-based outfit the Griquas for the 2016, Van Aswegen announced his retirement. He suffered a series of knee injuries during his career, which saw him undergo six knee operations, prior to his retirement from rugby, which saw him take up other business interests.

=== Statistics ===
First class career
Season	Teams	Super Rugby		Currie Cup		Vodacom Cup		Total	
Season	Teams	Apps	Pts	Apps	Pts	Apps	Pts	Apps	Pts
2010	Western Province	—	—	2	8	—	—	2	8
2011	Stormers	3	12	—	—	—	—	3	12
2011	Western Province	—	—	1	16	1	13	2	29
2012	Stormers	3	3	—	—	—	—	3	3
2012	Western Province	—	—	2	0	—	—	2	0
2013	Stormers	9	15	—	—	—	—	9	15
2013	Western Province	—	—	4	22	3	27	7	49
2014	Western Province	—	—	—	—	7	38	7	38
2014	Eastern Province Kings	—	—	8	30	—	—	8	30
2015	Eastern Province Kings	—	—	—	—	3	10	3	10
2010–2014	Western Province Total	—	—	9	46	11	78	20	124
2011–2013	Stormers Total	15	30	—	—	—	—	15	30
2014–2015	Eastern Province Kings Total	—	—	8	30	3	10	11	40
2010–2015	Career Total	15	30	17	76	14	88	46	194
