= Dale Chadwick =

South African rugby union footballer

- Full name: Dale Michael Chadwick
- Born: 20 June 1989 (age 37) Durban, South Africa
- Height: 1.83 m (6 ft 0 in)
- Weight: 117 kg (18 st 6 lb; 258 lb)
- School: Westville Boys' High School

Rugby union career
- Position: Loosehead Prop
- Current team: Narbonne
Youth career
- 2005–2010: Sharks
Senior career
| Years | Team | Apps | (Points) |
| 2009 | Sharks Invitational XV | 1 | (0) |
| 2009–2016 | Sharks (Currie Cup) | 51 | (10) |
| 2010–2016 | Sharks XV | 15 | (10) |
| 2012–2016 | Sharks | 44 | (5) |
| 2016–present | Narbonne | 10 | (0) |
- Correct as of 25 July 2018

Dale Michael Chadwick (born 20 June 1989) is a South African rugby union footballer. His regular playing position is loosehead prop. He last represented Narbonne in the French Pro D2, having previously played for the Sharks in Super Rugby.
