= Ross Cronjé =

South African rugby union player

- Born: 26 July 1989 (age 37) Johannesburg, South Africa
- Height: 1.80 m (5 ft 11 in)
- Weight: 88 kg (13 st 12 lb; 194 lb)
- School: Michaelhouse
- University: University of South Africa
- Notable relative: Guy Cronjé (twin brother)

Rugby union career
- Position: Scrum-half
- Current team: Lions / Golden Lions
Senior career
Years	Team	Apps	(Points)
2009–2011	Sharks XV	22	(49)
2009	Sharks	1	(0)
2009–2011	Sharks (Currie Cup)	14	(0)
2012–2018	Golden Lions XV	10	(6)
2012–2021	Lions	91	(35)
2012–2021	Golden Lions	65	(25)
- Correct as of 13 January 2022
International career
Years	Team	Apps	(Points)
2009	South Africa Under-20	5	(5)
2017–2018	South Africa	10	(10)
- Correct as of 17 April 2018

Ross Cronjé (born 26 July 1989) is a retired South African rugby player. He played at scrum-half for the Lions in Super Rugby, the Golden Lions in the Currie Cup and the Golden Lions XV in the Rugby Challenge. He previously played for the Sharks.

He is the twin brother of former Zimbabwean international Guy Cronjé.
