= Yaya Hartzenberg =

South African rugby player

- Full name: Vaasir Hartzenberg
- Born: 6 January 1989 (age 37) Cape Town, South Africa
- Height: 1.94 m (6 ft 4 1/2 in)
- Weight: 109 kg (17 st 2 lb; 240 lb)
- School: Paarl Boys' High School
- University: Boland College
- Notable relative: Suleiman Hartzenberg (brother) Munier Hartzenberg (brother)

Rugby union career
- Position: Flanker
- Current team: Griffons
Youth career
- 2004–2010: Western Province
Amateur team(s)
Years	Team	Apps	(Points)
2010	UCT Ikey Tigers	4	(20)
2012	UWC	1	(0)
Senior career
Years	Team	Apps	(Points)
2009–2012	Western Province	29	(30)
2013	Pumas	0	(0)
2014	Free State Cheetahs	0	(0)
2019–present	Griffons	4	(0)
- Correct as of 1 July 2019
International career
Years	Team	Apps	(Points)
2006	S.A. Schools		
2007	South Africa Under-19		
2009	South Africa Under-20		
- Correct as of 20 February 2014

Yaasier 'Yaya' Hartzenberg (born 6 January 1989) is a South African rugby union player for the Griffons in the Currie Cup and the Rugby Challenge.
