= Reuben Johannes =

South African rugby union player

- Full name: Reuben Benjamin Johannes
- Born: 5 October 1990 (age 36) Bellville, South Africa
- Height: 1.84 m (6 ft 1/2 in)
- Weight: 96 kg (212 lb; 15 st 2 lb)
- School: Paul Roos Gymnasium
- University: University of Stellenbosch

Rugby union career
- Position: Flanker
Youth career
- 2006–2011: Western Province
Amateur team(s)
| Years | Team | Apps | (Points) |
| 2011–2014 | Maties | 8 | (0) |
Senior career
| Years | Team | Apps | (Points) |
| 2011–2014 | Western Province | 11 | (15) |
| 2015 | Free State XV | 4 | (10) |
| 2016–2018 | Pumas | 7 | (5) |
- Correct as of 9 October 2016
International career
| Years | Team | Apps | (Points) |
| 2008 | South Africa Under-18 Elite Squad | | |
| 2012–2013 | South Africa Sevens | | |
- Correct as of 12 April 2013
Medal record
Men's rugby sevens
Representing South Africa
World Games
| Gold medal – first place | 2013 Cali | Team competition |

Reuben Benjamin Johannes (born 5 October 1990) is a South African professional rugby union player who last played for the Pumas in the Currie Cup and in the Rugby Challenge. His regular position is flanker.

== Career ==
He came through the youth system at Western Province, initially playing at the Under-16 Grant Khomo Week in 2006. Following the Under-18 Craven Week in 2008, he was also included in the South Africa Under-18 Elite Squad.

He played further games for the Under-19 and Under-21 teams and was included in Western Province's squad for the 2011 Vodacom Cup. He made his first class debut in the 56–9 victory over Namibian side Welwitschias. He made one additional appearance that season.

In 2012, he was once again included in the Vodacom Cup squad and made a further four appearances, scoring two tries. He was included in the squad for the 2012 Currie Cup Premier Division, but failed to make any matchday squads.

At the end of 2012, South Africa Sevens manager Paul Treu called him into the squad for the 2012 Gold Coast Sevens leg of the 2012–13 IRB Sevens World Series.

He also represented Maties in the 2011 and 2013 Varsity Cup competitions.

=== Pumas ===
He joined Nelspruit-based side the Pumas for the 2016 season.
