= Guy Cronjé =

South African rugby union player

- Born: 26 July 1989 (age 37) Johannesburg, South Africa
- Height: 1.76 m (5 ft 9 1/2 in)
- Weight: 83 kg (13 st 1 lb; 183 lb)
- School: Michaelhouse, KwaZulu-Natal
- University: Sharks Academy; University of South Africa
- Notable relative: Ross Cronjé (twin brother)

Rugby union career
- Position: Scrum-Half / Fly-Half
- Current team: College Rovers
Youth career
- 2005–2010: Sharks
Amateur team(s)
Years	Team	Apps	(Points)
2012–2013	UJ	10	(66)
2015	College Rovers	6	(0)
Senior career
Years	Team	Apps	(Points)
2009–2011	Sharks (Currie Cup)	20	(60)
2012–2014	Golden Lions	21	(94)
2013–2014	Lions	2	(0)
- Correct as of 7 April 2015
International career
Years	Team	Apps	(Points)
2014–2015	Zimbabwe	4	(48)

Guy Cronjé (born 26 July 1989) is a South African-born Zimbabwean former rugby union footballer. His regular playing position was fly-half.

== Club career ==
Cronjé played for the Sharks between 2009 and 2011 before making the move north to join the Golden Lions along with twin brother Ross ahead of the 2012 season. He represented the Golden Lions in the Currie Cup and Vodacom Cup competition until 2014 and also made two appearances for the Lions in the 2013 Super Rugby season promotion/relegation play-offs.

He was also a member of the University of Johannesburg squad during the 2012 and 2013 Varsity Cup competitions.

== Representative rugby ==
Through his paternal grandparents, Cronjé gained eligibility to play for Zimbabwe internationally. In 2014, he was included in their squad for the 2014 Africa Cup competition. Cronjé started at fly-half in all three of Zimbabwe's games, scored 43 points including a try against Kenya. Zimbabwe were runners-up in the tournament, missing out on automatic qualification for the 2015 Rugby World Cup. They instead progressed to the repechage tournament for qualification, where they faced Russia in the semi-finals. Zimbabwe lost 23–15, ending their World Cup qualification hopes. This was Cronjé's final match for the Sables before medical issues forced him to stop playing.
