= Nick Köster =

South African rugby union player (1989–2023)

Ralph Nick
- Born: Nicholas Ralph Köster; 22 February 1989 Robertson, Cape Province, South Africa
- Died: 12 July 2023 (aged 34) Norfolk, England, United Kingdom
- Height: 1.93 m (6 ft 4 in)
- Weight: 104 kg (16 st 5 lb)
- School: Bishops College
- University: UCT, University of Cambridge

Rugby union career
- Position: Flanker, eighthman
Amateur team(s)
Years	Team	Apps	(Points)
2017–	Cambridge University		
Senior career
Years	Team	Apps	(Points)
2012–2013	Bath	11	(10)
2013–2017	Bristol	62	(60)
- Correct as of 1 April 2015
Provincial / State sides
Years	Team	Apps	(Points)
2008–2012	Western Province	32	(35)
Super Rugby
Years	Team	Apps	(Points)
2009–2012	Stormers	26	(10)
- Correct as of 30 March 2015

Nicholas Ralph Köster (22 February 1989 – 12 July 2023) was a South African rugby union player. He last played professionally for Bristol in the position of Flanker or Eight Man. He was latterly captain of Cambridge University R.U.F.C.

== Biography ==
Köster attended Bishops College in Cape Town and played in their First XV rugby team in 2006 and 2007. In 2006, he played alongside Martin Muller and Mathew Turner. Köster made the Western Province Craven Week side in 2006 and 2007 when he was captain. He was called up for South Africa Schools in both 2006 and 2007.

=== Professional rugby ===
Köster made his Currie Cup debut at the age of 19, playing at 8th man in 2008, and was picked on the bench for the Barbarians side to play Australia at Wembley, later that year. He made his Super Rugby debut for the Stormers in 2009, playing on the wing, but suffered a knee injury against the Lions at Newlands Stadium which put him out of action.

His full-time return to the top flight was off the bench against the Griquas on 8 August 2010. The following week, he started at openside flank (no.7) versus the Blue Bulls. Köster had Province's highest tackle count (24 tackles) against the Blue Bulls, while his 11 ball carries was second only to Duane Vermeulen and he was one of only three WP players to secure a turnover.

In October 2012, it was announced that he would join Bath. He scored his first try for his new club against Italian team Calvisano in the Amlin Challenge Cup.

Köster joined then RFU Championship club Bristol on a season long loan from August 2013, which evolved into Nick earning a permanent contract with Bristol, aiding them in their promotion to the Aviva Premiership in 2016.

In 2014, Nick became an ambassador for Project Zulu, a UK based charity running educational development projects in the Madadeni township, KZN, South Africa. During Project Zulu’s 2015 and 2016 UK Choir Tours Nick arranged for the South African choir to perform on the pitch at half time of Bristol games. He and his wife had also hosted young people from Madadeni during Project Zulu fundraising choir tours in 2015 and 2016.

Prior to the 2017/18 Aviva Premiership season, Koster was one of several players released by Bristol.

=== University sport and study ===
Soon after leaving Bristol, Köster joined Cambridge University to study an MSt in Social Innovation. He also joined the university's rugby team for the 2017-2018 rugby season. On 19 January 2018, Koster was named men's captain for the Cambridge University R.U.F.C. 2018 rugby season.

=== Death ===
Köster died on 12 July 2023, at the age of 34. His cause of death was suicide while receiving mental health treatment in Norfolk.

=== Legacy ===
In 2024, the Cambridge University Rugby Football Club announced the Nick Koster Social Innovation Scholarship for prospective students interested in pursuing social innovation studies at Cambridge.
