= Caylib Oosthuizen =

South African rugby union player

- Full name: Caylib Rees Oosthuizen
- Born: 1 September 1989 (age 37) Cape Town, South Africa
- Height: 1.85 m (6 ft 1 in)
- Weight: 116 kg (18 st 4 lb; 256 lb)
- School: Oudtshoorn High
- University: University of Johannesburg

Rugby union career
- Position: Loosehead Prop
- Current team: Asia Pacific Dragons
Youth career
- 2007: SWD Eagles
- 2008–2010: Golden Lions
Amateur team(s)
Years	Team	Apps	(Points)
2011	UJ	8	(0)
Senior career
Years	Team	Apps	(Points)
2011	Golden Lions XV	2	(0)
2012	Golden Lions	2	(0)
2012	Lions	6	(5)
2013–2015	Free State XV	5	(0)
2013–2015	Free State Cheetahs	13	(0)
2013–2015	Cheetahs	19	(0)
2016	Eastern Province Kings	1	(0)
2017	Stormers	3	(0)
2017–2018	Western Province	23	(10)
- Correct as of 3 November 2018
International career
Years	Team	Apps	(Points)
2007	SA Schools Academy		
2009	South Africa U20	5	(0)
- Correct as of 23 July 2013

Caylib Rees Oosthuizen (born 1 September 1989) is a South African professional rugby union player who plays as a loosehead prop for Tel Aviv Heat in Rugby Europe Super Cup. He previously played for Western Province in the Currie Cup and in the Rugby Challenge.

== Career ==
Oosthuizen began his senior career in Johannesburg with the Lions, starting in his first 6 Super Rugby games. He was subsequently invited to one of the Springboks preliminary training camps. He joined the Free State Cheetahs in 2013 and represented them in the Super Rugby Vodacom Cup and Currie Cup competitions.

In 2013, he was included in the Cheetahs squad for the 2013 Super Rugby season. Again included in 2014, by starting in a 21–20 defeat to the Lions in Bloemfontein. He started in 13 of the 16 super rugby games that year.

Oosthuizen previously represented the University of Johannesburg in the 2011 Varsity Cup where he started all 8 of his sides' matches.

== International ==
Oosthuizen represented South Africa under 20 in the 2009 IRB Junior World Championship in Japan.
