= Cameron Jacobs =

South African rugby union footballer

- Full name: Cameron Luciano Jacobs
- Born: 31 October 1989 (age 37) Port Elizabeth, South Africa
- Height: 1.78 m (5 ft 10 in)
- Weight: 83 kg (13 st 1 lb; 183 lb)
- School: Framesby High
- University: University of the Free State

Rugby union career
- Position: Centre / Winger
- Current team: Despatch
Youth career
- 2005–2007: Eastern Province Kings
- 2008–2010: Free State Cheetahs
Amateur team(s)
Years	Team	Apps	(Points)
2008–2012	UFS Shimlas		
2015–present	Despatch	3	(10)
Senior career
Years	Team	Apps	(Points)
2011–2014	Free State Cheetahs	18	(15)
2012	Cheetahs	9	(0)
2012, 2014	→ Griffons	14	(15)
- Correct as of 7 April 2015
International career
Years	Team	Apps	(Points)
2008	South Africa Students	1	(0)
- Correct as of 15 April 2015

Cameron Luciano Jacobs (born 31 October 1989) is a South African rugby player. He plays as either a centre or winger for Eastern Province Grand Challenge club side Despatch, having previously played for the Cheetahs in Super Rugby and for the Free State Cheetahs and Griffons in the Currie Cup and Vodacom Cup competitions. He has also played Varsity Cup rugby for UFS Shimlas.
