= Jandré Marais =

South African rugby union player

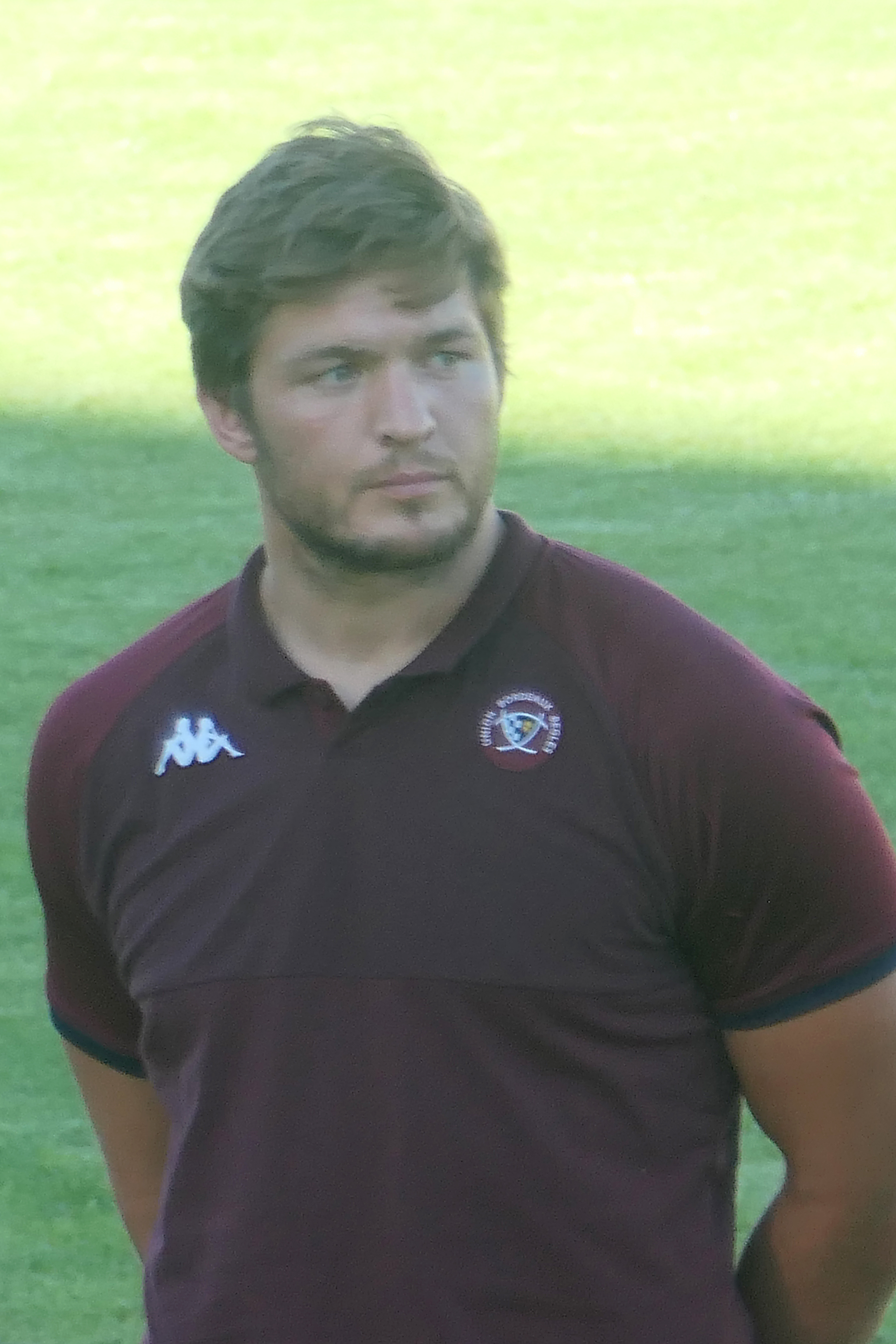
- Born: Jan André Marais; 14 June 1989 (age 37) Welkom, South Africa
- Height: 1.98 m (6 ft 6 in)
- Weight: 118 kg (18 st 8 lb)
- School: Welkom Gimnasium

Rugby union career
Senior career
Years	Team	Apps	(Points)
2013–2023	Bordeaux Bègles	166	(55)
Provincial / State sides
Years	Team	Apps	(Points)
2009–2013	Sharks (Currie Cup)	59	(10)
Super Rugby
Years	Team	Apps	(Points)
2012–2013	Sharks	11	(5)

Jandré Marais (born 14 June 1989) is a former South African rugby union footballer. His regular playing position is lock. He represented Bordeaux Bègles in the French Top 14, Sharks in Super Rugby and the Currie Cup.

In December 2018, Marais was sidelined for the remainder of the 2018–19 season with a serious leg injury, after rupturing his cruciate ligament during a match.
