= Joubert Engelbrecht =

South African rugby union player

- Full name: Gabriel Joubert Engelbrecht
- Born: 27 June 1989 (age 37) Kimberley, South Africa
- Height: 1.90 m (6 ft 3 in)
- Weight: 97 kg (15 st 4 lb; 214 lb)
- School: Upington High School
- University: North-West University

Rugby union career
- Position: Centre
- Current team: Ordizia RE
Youth career
- 2006–2007: Griquas
- 2008–2010: Leopards
Amateur team(s)
Years	Team	Apps	(Points)
2012	NWU Pukke	8	(20)
2014	UFS Shimlas	7	(15)
Senior career
Years	Team	Apps	(Points)
2010–2012	Leopards	36	(70)
2013–2015	Free State XV	19	(35)
2013–2015	Free State Cheetahs	10	(5)
2013–2014	→ Griffons	14	(23)
2016–2018	Griffons	35	(30)
2016	Cheetahs	1	(0)
2018–present	Ordizia RE	0	(0)
- Correct as of 13 July 2018
International career
Years	Team	Apps	(Points)
2012	South Africa Students	1	(0)
2012	South African Barbarians (South)	1	(5)
- Correct as of 4 October 2012

Gabriel Joubert Engelbrecht is a South African rugby union player for Spanish División de Honor de Rugby side Ordizia RE. His usual position is centre.

== Career ==
He represented Griquas at several youth levels before moving to the Leopards, where he made his first team debut against the SWD Eagles in the 2010 Currie Cup Premier Division relegation play-offs.

He then signed a contract with the Cheetahs for the 2013 Super Rugby season.
