= 2015 Vodacom Cup =

- Countries: South Africa; Namibia
- Date: 6 March – 30 May 2015
- Champions: Pumas (1st title)
- Runners-up: Western Province
- Matches played: 63
- Tries scored: 430 (average 6.8 per match)
- Top point scorer: JC Roos (118)
- Top try scorer: Alshaun Bock (8)

The 2015 Vodacom Cup was contested from 6 March to 30 May 2015. The tournament was the 18th edition of the Vodacom Cup, an annual domestic South African rugby union competition, and was played between the fourteen provincial teams in South Africa, as well as the Limpopo Blue Bulls and Namibian side Welwitschias.

The tournament was won by the Pumas for the first time; they beat Western Province 24–7 in the final played on 30 May 2015.

== Competition rules and information ==
Sixteen teams participated in the 2015 Vodacom Cup competition. These teams were geographically divided into two sections, with eight teams in each of the Northern and Southern Sections. Teams played all the teams in their section once over the course of the season, either at home or away. At the request of the Namibia Rugby Union, all the Welwitschias' matches were played in Windhoek.

Teams received four log points for a win and two points for a draw. Bonus log points were awarded to teams that scored four or more tries in a game, as well as to teams that lost a match by seven points or less. Teams were ranked by log points, then points difference (points scored less points conceded).

The top four teams in each section qualified for the title play-offs. In the quarter-finals, the teams that finished first in each section had home advantage against the teams that finished fourth in the other section and the teams that finished second in each section had home advantage against the teams that finished third in the other section. The winners of these quarter finals then played each other in the semi-finals, with the higher-placed team having home advantage. The two semi-final winners then met in the final.

=== Quotas ===
This competition saw the retention of the quota system used in 2014. Each match-day squad had to contain seven black players. Two of these had to be forwards and five of these had to be in the starting line-up.

== Teams ==
Location of teams in the 2015 Vodacom Cup
Northern Section
Southern Section

=== Changes from 2014 ===
In September 2014, the Namibia Rugby Union revealed that they were in talks with the South African Rugby Union to enter the competition for the first time since 2011. Namibia's participation was confirmed on 19 November 2014 and it was later revealed that their new sponsor, First National Bank, agreed to a three-year sponsorship deal which should ensure their participation in the competition until 2017.

In addition, the Kenya Rugby Football Union also initially indicated that they intended to once again enter a team in the competition. However, after being included in the fixture list for the competition, the Kenyan RFU withdrew from the competition a month before its scheduled start date due to financial considerations. As a result, Griquas moved to the Southern Section of the competition, inheriting the Simba XV's fixtures.

=== Team Listing ===
The following teams took part in the 2015 Vodacom Cup competition:

2015 Vodacom Cup teams
| Team | Sponsored Name | Stadium/s | Sponsored Name |
Northern Section teams
| Blue Bulls | Vodacom Blue Bulls | Loftus Versfeld, Pretoria | Loftus Versfeld |
| Falcons | Hino Falcons | Barnard Stadium, Kempton Park | Barnard Stadium |
| Golden Lions | Emirates Airline Golden Lions | Ellis Park Stadium, Johannesburg | Emirates Airline Park |
| Griffons | Down Touch Griffons | North West Stadium, Welkom | HT Pelatona Projects Stadium |
| Leopards XV | Leopards XV | Olën Park, Potchefstroom | Profert Olën Park |
| Limpopo Blue Bulls | Assupol Limpopo Blue Bulls | Peter Mokaba Stadium, Polokwane | Peter Mokaba Stadium |
| Pumas | Steval Pumas | Mbombela Stadium, Mbombela | Mbombela Stadium |
| Welwitschias | FNB Welwitschias | Hage Geingob Stadium, Windhoek | Hage Geingob Stadium |
Southern Section teams
| Boland Cavaliers | Regent Boland Cavaliers | Boland Stadium, Wellington | Boland Stadium |
| Border Bulldogs | Border Bulldogs | Buffalo City Stadium, East London | Buffalo City Stadium |
| Eastern Province Kings | Eastern Province Kings | Nelson Mandela Bay Stadium, Port Elizabeth | Nelson Mandela Bay Stadium |
| Free State XV | Toyota Free State XV | Free State Stadium, Bloemfontein | Free State Stadium |
| Griquas | GWK Griquas | Griqua Park, Kimberley | GWK Park |
| Sharks XV | Cell C Sharks XV | Kings Park Stadium, Durban | Growthpoint Kings Park |
| SWD Eagles | SWD Eagles | Outeniqua Park, George | Outeniqua Park |
| Western Province | DHL Western Province | Newlands Stadium, Cape Town | DHL Newlands |

== Logs ==
The top four teams in each section will qualify to the quarter-finals, with their final log positions determining their seedings in the quarter finals. In the quarter finals, the teams that finish first in each section will have home advantage against the teams that finish fourth in the other section and the teams that finish second in each section will have home advantage against the teams that finish third in the other section. The winners of these quarter finals will then play each other in the semi-finals, with the higher-placed team having home advantage. The two semi-final winners will then meet in the final.

Northern Section
| Pos | Team | Pld | W | D | L | PF | PA | PD | TF | TA | TB | LB | Pts | Qualification |
|---|---|---|---|---|---|---|---|---|---|---|---|---|---|---|
| 1 | Golden Lions | 7 | 7 | 0 | 0 | 279 | 108 | +171 | 38 | 15 | 5 | 0 | 33 | Qualified for quarter-finals |
| 2 | Blue Bulls | 7 | 6 | 0 | 1 | 282 | 114 | +168 | 40 | 11 | 5 | 0 | 29 | Qualified for quarter-finals |
| 3 | Pumas | 7 | 5 | 0 | 2 | 263 | 114 | +149 | 32 | 13 | 3 | 1 | 24 | Qualified for quarter-finals |
| 4 | Leopards XV | 7 | 4 | 0 | 3 | 208 | 217 | −9 | 28 | 28 | 4 | 0 | 20 | Qualified for quarter-finals |
| 5 | Falcons | 7 | 3 | 0 | 4 | 213 | 200 | +13 | 31 | 26 | 5 | 2 | 19 | |
| 6 | Griffons | 7 | 2 | 0 | 5 | 160 | 286 | −126 | 23 | 40 | 3 | 0 | 11 | |
| 7 | (Namibia) Welwitschias | 7 | 1 | 0 | 6 | 94 | 285 | −191 | 13 | 41 | 2 | 1 | 7 | |
| 8 | Limpopo Blue Bulls | 7 | 0 | 0 | 7 | 115 | 290 | −175 | 12 | 43 | 1 | 1 | 2 | |

Southern Section
| Pos | Team | Pld | W | D | L | PF | PA | PD | TF | TA | TB | LB | Pts | Qualification |
|---|---|---|---|---|---|---|---|---|---|---|---|---|---|---|
| 1 | Western Province | 7 | 7 | 0 | 0 | 188 | 103 | +85 | 23 | 11 | 4 | 0 | 32 | Qualified for quarter-finals |
| 2 | Griquas | 7 | 6 | 0 | 1 | 205 | 138 | +67 | 24 | 16 | 3 | 1 | 28 | Qualified for quarter-finals |
| 3 | Free State XV | 7 | 4 | 0 | 3 | 215 | 170 | +45 | 28 | 17 | 4 | 2 | 22 | Qualified for quarter-finals |
| 4 | SWD Eagles | 7 | 4 | 0 | 3 | 193 | 137 | +56 | 21 | 16 | 3 | 1 | 20 | Qualified for quarter-finals |
| 5 | Eastern Province Kings | 7 | 3 | 0 | 4 | 181 | 162 | +19 | 26 | 18 | 3 | 2 | 17 | |
| 6 | Sharks XV | 7 | 2 | 0 | 5 | 180 | 165 | +15 | 24 | 22 | 2 | 1 | 11 | |
| 7 | Border Bulldogs | 7 | 1 | 0 | 6 | 104 | 206 | −102 | 11 | 28 | 1 | 1 | 6 | |
| 8 | Boland Cavaliers | 7 | 1 | 0 | 6 | 105 | 290 | −185 | 15 | 44 | 1 | 0 | 5 | |

Rules for classification:
- Log points
- Overall points difference
- Number of tries scored
- Points scored in away matches
- Fewest red cards
- Toss of a coin
Points breakdown:
- 4 points for a win
- 2 points for a draw
- 1 bonus point for a loss by seven points or less
- 1 bonus point for scoring four or more tries in a match

=== Round-by-round ===
The table below shows each team's progression throughout the season. For each round, their cumulative points total is shown with the overall log position in brackets:

Team Progression – 2015 Vodacom Cup North Section
| Team | R1 | R2 | R3 | R4 | R5 | R6 | R7 | R8 | R9 | Qtr | Semi | Final |
|---|---|---|---|---|---|---|---|---|---|---|---|---|
| Golden Lions | 5 (1st) | 10 (2nd) | 14 (2nd) | 19 (1st) | 23 (1st) | 23 (2nd) | 28 (1st) | 28 (2nd) | 33 (1st) | Won | Lost | —N/a |
| Blue Bulls | 5 (3rd) | 10 (3rd) | 10 (3rd) | 14 (3rd) | 19 (2nd) | 24 (1st) | 24 (3rd) | 29 (1st) | 29 (2nd) | Won | Lost | —N/a |
| Pumas | 5 (2nd) | 10 (1st) | 15 (1st) | 16 (2nd) | 16 (3rd) | 20 (3rd) | 24 (2nd) | 24 (3rd) | 24 (3rd) | Won | Won | Won |
| Leopards XV | 5 (4th) | 5 (4th) | 10 (4th) | 10 (4th) | 10 (4th) | 10 (4th) | 10 (5th) | 15 (4th) | 20 (4th) | Lost | —N/a | —N/a |
| Falcons | 0 (6th) | 0 (6th) | 2 (5th) | 3 (6th) | 8 (5th) | 8 (5th) | 9 (6th) | 14 (5th) | 19 (5th) | —N/a | —N/a | —N/a |
| Griffons | 0 (7th) | 0 (7th) | 0 (6th) | 5 (5th) | 5 (6th) | 5 (7th) | 10 (4th) | 10 (6th) | 11 (6th) | —N/a | —N/a | —N/a |
| Welwitschias | 0 (8th) | 0 (8th) | 0 (8th) | 2 (7th) | 2 (7th) | 6 (6th) | 6 (7th) | 6 (7th) | 7 (7th) | —N/a | —N/a | —N/a |
| Limpopo Blue Bulls | 0 (5th) | 0 (5th) | 0 (7th) | 0 (8th) | 0 (8th) | 1 (8th) | 1 (8th) | 1 (8th) | 2 (8th) | —N/a | —N/a | —N/a |
Team Progression – 2015 Vodacom Cup South Section
| Team | | | R1 | R2 | R3 | R4 | R5 | R6 | R7 | Qtr | Semi | Final |
| Western Province | | | 5 (2nd) | 10 (1st) | 14 (1st) | 19 (1st) | 23 (1st) | 27 (1st) | 32 (1st) | Won | Won | Lost |
| Griquas | | | 4 (4th) | 8 (2nd) | 13 (2nd) | 18 (2nd) | 19 (2nd) | 24 (2nd) | 28 (2nd) | Lost | —N/a | —N/a |
| Free State XV | | | 0 (7th) | 5 (4th) | 10 (3rd) | 15 (3rd) | 19 (3rd) | 21 (3rd) | 22 (3rd) | Lost | —N/a | —N/a |
| SWD Eagles | | | 4 (3rd) | 5 (5th) | 6 (4th) | 11 (4th) | 15 (4th) | 20 (4th) | 20 (4th) | Lost | —N/a | —N/a |
| Eastern Province Kings | | | 0 (5th) | 5 (6th) | 6 (5th) | 8 (5th) | 8 (6th) | 13 (5th) | 17 (5th) | —N/a | —N/a | —N/a |
| Sharks XV | | | 5 (1st) | 5 (3rd) | 5 (6th) | 5 (6th) | 10 (5th) | 10 (6th) | 11 (6th) | —N/a | —N/a | —N/a |
| Border Bulldogs | | | 0 (8th) | 0 (8th) | 0 (8th) | 0 (8th) | 1 (8th) | 1 (8th) | 6 (7th) | —N/a | —N/a | —N/a |
| Boland Cavaliers | | | 0 (6th) | 0 (7th) | 5 (7th) | 5 (7th) | 5 (7th) | 5 (7th) | 5 (8th) | —N/a | —N/a | —N/a |
| Key: | win | draw | loss | bye | | | | | | | | |

== Results ==
The following matches were played in the 2015 Vodacom Cup:

All times are South African (GMT+2).

=== Northern Section ===
==== Round one ====
| 6 March 2015 | Falcons | 13–37 | Blue Bulls | Barnard Stadium, Kempton Park |
| 15:00 | Try: Andrew van Wyk 58'; Con: Jaun Kotzé 59' (1/1); Pen: Jaun Kotzé 3', 24' (2/2) | Report; Scoreboard | Try: Travis Ismaiel 11'; Roelof Smit 19'; Warrick Gelant 27'; Marquit September 72'; Arno van Wyk 78'; Con: Kobus Marais 28', 72', 78' (3/5); Pen: Kobus Marais 62', 67' (2/2); Cards: Jamba Ulengo (yellow card) 25' to 35' | Attendance: 250; Referee: Kurt Weaver |

| 6 March 2015 | Pumas | 57–18 | Griffons | Mbombela Stadium, Mbombela |
| 19:00 | Try: Bernado Botha 9'; Wilmaure Louw 14'; Stefan Watermeyer 26'; JC Roos 29'; Brian Shabangu 36', 46'; Marcello Sampson 52'; Marnus Schoeman 58'; Con: JC Roos 10', 14', 27', 29', 47', 52' (6/7); Justin van Staden 59' (1/1); Pen: JC Roos 1' (1/1) | Report; Scoreboard | Try: Vuyo Mbotho 43'; Joe van der Hoogt 79'; Con: Louis Strydom (0/1); Wynand Pienaar 79' (1/1); Pen: Louis Strydom 3', 19' (2/3) | Attendance: 1,462; Referee: Ben Crouse |

| 6 March 2015 | Welwitschias | 3–53 | Golden Lions | Hage Geingob Stadium, Windhoek |
| 19:00 | Pen: Henrique Olivier (0/2); Johann Tromp 29' (1/2) | Report; Scoreboard | Try: Alwyn Hollenbach 10'; Ruaan Lerm 21', 25', 32'; Bobby de Wee 37', 65'; Stephan de Wit 42', 72'; Con: Ashlon Davids 22', 26', 33' (3/6); Damian Engledoe 66', 73' (2/2); Pen: Ashlon Davids 7' (1/2) | Attendance: 3,200; Referee: Pro Legoete |

| 7 March 2015 | Leopards XV | 22–9 | Limpopo Blue Bulls | Olën Park, Potchefstroom |
| 15:00 | Try: Alvino Montjies 5'; Stoof Bezuidenhout 11'; Jaco Hayward 16'; Sergio Torrens 70'; Con: Warren Gilbert 12' (1/3); Kobus du Plessis (0/1); Cards: Juan Language (yellow card) 65' to 75' | Report; Scoreboard | Pen: Anton Beswick 4', 20', 23' (3/4); Cards: Dwane Morrison (yellow card) 59' to 70' | Attendance: 150; Referee: Jason Jaftha |

==== Round two ====
| 13 March 2015 | Blue Bulls | 46–25 | Leopards XV | Loftus Versfeld, Pretoria |
| 15:30 | Try: Arno van Wyk 11'; Marvin Orie 17'; Travis Ismaiel 19'; Arno Botha 26'; Marquit September 53'; Jade Stighling 63'; Nardus van der Walt 70'; Con: Kobus Marais 17', 19', 26', 53' (4/7); Pen: Kobus Marais 29' (1/3) | Report; Scoreboard | Try: Warren Gilbert 6'; Jaco Hayward 15'; Chris Schoonraad 34'; Con: Warren Gilbert 7', 15' (2/3); Pen: Warren Gilbert 4', 42' (2/2) | Attendance: 200; Referee: Rodney Boneparte |

| 13 March 2015 | Welwitschias | 7–61 | Pumas | Hage Geingob Stadium, Windhoek |
| 19:00 | Try: Jacques Nell 55'; Con: Shaun Kaizemi 56' (1/1); Pen: Henrique Olivier (0/1); Cards: Roderique Victor (yellow card) 65' to 75' | Report; Scoreboard | Try: Jason Fraser 2'; Heinrich Steyl 16', 27'; Rudi Mathee 21'; Marcello Sampson 34', 43' penalty try 62'; Ruwellyn Isbell 68'; Wilmaure Louw 74'; Con: Justin van Staden 3', 22', 28', 35', 44', 63', 69' (7/8); JC Roos 74' (1/1) | Referee: Jaco Pretorius |

| 13 March 2015 | Limpopo Blue Bulls | 21–31 | Golden Lions | Peter Mokaba Stadium, Polokwane |
| 19:10 | Try: Peet Vorster 48'; Fanie Raseroka 60'; Con: Anton Beswick 49' (1/2); Pen: Anton Beswick 9', 13', 68' (3/5) | Report; Scoreboard | Try: Malcolm Marx 5'; Thabo Mabuza 38'; Cyle Brink 52'; Christiaan Meyer 72'; Con: Warren Potgieter 6', 39', 53', 73' (4/4); Pen: Warren Potgieter 4' (1/1) | Referee: AJ Jacobs |

Bye/s: Falcons, Griffons

==== Round three ====
| 20 March 2015 | Golden Lions | 24–12 | Blue Bulls | Ellis Park Stadium, Johannesburg |
| 15:00 | Try: Lohan Jacobs 7'; Anthony Volmink 22'; Damian Engledoe 33'; Con: Ashlon Davids 8', 23', 34' (3/3); Pen: Ashlon Davids 2' (1/2); Cards: Malcolm Marx (yellow card) 31' to 41' | Report; Scoreboard | Try: Kefentse Mahlo 44', 61'; Con: Kobus Marais 45' (1/1); Kurt Webster (0/1); Pen: Kobus Marais (0/1); Cards: Kefentse Mahlo (yellow card) 70' to 80' | Referee: Quinton Immelman |

| 21 March 2015 | Leopards XV | 36–31 | Falcons | Hoërskool Lichtenburg, Lichtenburg |
| 14:30 | Try: Jaco Hayward 20'; Juan Language 26'; PJ Uys 29'; Thomas Dreyer 60'; Percy Williams 67'; Con: Kobus du Plessis 21', 27', 30', 68' (4/5); Pen: Kobus du Plessis 5' (1/1); Cards: PJ Uys (yellow card) 12' to 22' | Report; Scoreboard | Try: Riaan Arends 23', 32', 41'; Grant Janke 47'; Con: Jaun Kotzé 24', 33', 42', 48' (4/4); Pen: Jaun Kotzé 62' (1/1); Cards: Jacques Alberts (yellow card) 59' to 69' | Referee: Francois Pretorius |

| 21 March 2015 | Pumas | 52–0 | Limpopo Blue Bulls | Lilian Ngoyi Stadium, Secunda |
| 16:00 | Try: Marnus Schoeman 2', 57'; Ruwellyn Isbell 9', 49'; Hennie Skorbinski 11'; François du Toit 17'; Lambert Groenewald 23'; Sino Nyoka 35'; Con: JC Roos 3', 12', 18', 24', 36', 58' (6/8); Cards: Bernado Botha (yellow card) 33' to 42' | Report; Scoreboard | | Referee: Archie Sehlako |

Bye/s: Griffons, Welwitschias

==== Round four ====
| 27 March 2015 | Welwitschias | 28–32 | Griffons | Hage Geingob Stadium, Windhoek |
| 19:00 | Try: Russell van Wyk 3'; Justin Nel 7', 34', 62'; Con: Shaun Kaizemi 63' (1/3); Pen: Shaun Kaizemi 16', 23' (2/2) | Report; Scoreboard | Try: Wynand Pienaar 10'; Bren Marais 20'; Martin Sithole 51'; Boetie Groenewald 67'; Con: Louis Strydom 11', 52', 68' (3/4); Pen: Louis Strydom 26', 31' (2/3); Wynand Pienaar (0/1) | Referee: Rodney Boneparte |

| 28 March 2015 | Falcons | 26–48 | Golden Lions | Barnard Stadium, Kempton Park |
| 15:00 | Try: Jacques Alberts 27'; Anrich Richter 49', 59'; Arno Poley 74'; Con: Jaun Kotzé 28', 50', 60' (3/4) | Report; Scoreboard | Try: Stephan de Wit 13', 38'; Kobus de Kock 19', 69'; Ruaan Lerm 23'; Malcolm Marx 30'; Con: Ashlon Davids 14', 20', 24', 31', 39' (5/5); Warren Potgieter 70' (1/1); Pen: Ashlon Davids 2', 11' (2/2); Cards: MB Lusaseni (yellow card) 42' to 52'; Ruaan Lerm (yellow card) 72' | Referee: Lourens van der Merwe |

| 28 March 2015 | Blue Bulls | 20–18 | Pumas | Loftus Versfeld, Pretoria |
| 16:30 | Try: Jamba Ulengo 5'; Marquit September 50'; Con: Kobus Marais 6', 51' (2/2); Pen: Kobus Marais 43', 77' (2/3) | Report; Scoreboard | Pen: Justin van Staden 16', 18', 25', 45' (4/4); JC Roos 67', 75' (2/2); Cards: Jacques Momberg (yellow card) 39' to 49' | Referee: Tahla Ntshakaza |

Bye/s: Leopards XV, Limpopo Blue Bulls

==== Round Five ====
| 10 April 2015 | Griffons | 17–38 | Falcons | HT Pelatona Projects Stadium, Welkom |
| 15:00 | Try: Martin Sithole 14'; Ossie Nortjé 66'; Con: Louis Strydom 15', 67' (2/2); Pen: Louis Strydom 43' (1/1) | Report; Scoreboard | Try: Arno Poley 21', 29'; Dean Muir 36'; Jaun Kotzé 49'; Ernst Ladendorf 56'; Andrew van Wyk 74'; Con: Jaun Kotzé 22', 30', 50', 75' (4/6); Pen: Jaun Kotzé (0/1); Cards: Grant Janke (yellow card) 76' | Attendance: 150; Referee: Jaco Kotze |

| 10 April 2015 | Welwitschias | 0–44 | Blue Bulls | Hage Geingob Stadium, Windhoek |
| 19:00 | | Report; Scoreboard | Try: Roelof Smit 18', 47'; Marquit September 43'; Kefentse Mahlo 51'; Corniel Els 54', 70'; Kobus Marais 62'; Con: Kobus Marais 44', 55' (2/6); Tinus de Beer 71' (1/1); Pen: Kobus Marais 30' (1/1); Tinus de Beer (0/1) | Referee: Oregopotse Rametsi |

| 11 April 2015 | Pumas | 16–24 | Golden Lions | Mbombela Stadium, Mbombela |
| 15:00 | Try: Trompie Pretorius 22'; Con: JC Roos 23' (1/1); Pen: JC Roos 5', 12', 40' (3/5) | Report; Scoreboard | Try: Ashlon Davids 7'; Jacques Nel 32', 71'; Con: Ashlon Davids 8', 33', 72' (3/3); Pen: Kobus de Kock 30' (1/2); Ashlon Davids (0/1); Cards: Ashlon Davids (yellow card) 40' to 50'; Pieter Scholtz (yellow card) 77' | Referee: Jaco Pretorius |

Bye/s: Leopards XV, Limpopo Blue Bulls

==== Round Six ====
| 17 April 2015 | Blue Bulls | 40–21 | Griffons | Loftus Versfeld, Pretoria |
| 15:30 | Try: Jamba Ulengo 2', 68'; Kefentse Mahlo 15', 31'; Arno van Wyk 29'; Con: Tinus de Beer 29', 31' (2/4); Kobus Marais 69' (1/1); Pen: Tinus de Beer 9' (1/1); Kobus Marais 78', 80' (2/2); Cards: Marvin Orie (yellow card) 38' to 48' | Report; Scoreboard | Try: Nicky Steyn 39', 62'; Martin Sithole 44'; Con: Franna du Toit 40', 45', 63' (3/3); Cards: Frans Sisita (red card) 78' | Referee: Francois Pretorius |

| 17 April 2015 | Leopards XV | 23–31 | Pumas | Olën Park, Potchefstroom |
| 16:30 | Try: Sergio Torrens 37'; Jaco Hayward 42'; Con: Kobus du Plessis 38', 42' (2/2); Pen: Kobus du Plessis 11', 15', 45' (3/3) | Report; Scoreboard | Try: Jaco Bouwer 2'; Frikkie Spies 17'; JC Roos 73'; Con: JC Roos 18', 74' (2/3); Pen: JC Roos 32', 51', 57', 59' (4/5); Drop: JC Roos (0/1) | Referee: Jaco Kotze |

| 18 April 2015 | Welwitschias | 24–17 | Limpopo Blue Bulls | Hage Geingob Stadium, Windhoek |
| 15:00 | Try: Johann Tromp 10', 21', 49'; Con: Shaun Kaizemi 11', 22', 50' (3/3); Pen: Shaun Kaizemi 27' (1/2); Cards: Jaco Engels (yellow card) 61' to 72' | Report; Scoreboard | Try: Heinrich Els 70'; Marnus Erasmus 74'; Con: Anton Beswick 71', 75' (2/2); Pen: Anton Beswick 19' (1/2) | Referee: Stephan Geldenhuys |

Bye/s: Falcons, Golden Lions

==== Round Seven ====
| 24 April 2015 | Pumas | 28–22 | Falcons | Mbombela Stadium, Mbombela |
| 19:00 | Try: Bernado Botha 21'; JW Bell 43'; Reynier van Rooyen 52'; Con: JC Roos 22', 53' (2/3); Pen: JC Roos 16', 30', 74' (3/4) | Report; Scoreboard | Try: Anrich Richter 10', 37'; Friedle Olivier 63'; Con: Jaun Kotzé 38', 63' (2/3); Pen: Jaun Kotzé 19' (1/1) | Attendance: 4,000; Referee: Archie Sehlako |

| 25 April 2015 | Golden Lions | 63–10 | Leopards XV | Ellis Park Stadium, Johannesburg |
| 14:30 | Try: Schalk van der Merwe 26', 43'; Ashlon Davids 46'; Jano Venter 57', 68'; Mark Pretorius 62'; Ramone Samuels 63'; Mark Richards 79'; Con: Jaco van der Walt 44', 47', 58', 63', 64', 69', 80' (7/8); Pen: Jaco van der Walt 12', 22', 37' (3/3) | Report; Scoreboard | Try: Juan Language 17'; Wilmar Arnoldi 76'; Con: Kobus du Plessis (0/1); Warren Gilbert (0/1); Pen: Kobus du Plessis (0/1) | Referee: Jaco Pretorius |

| 25 April 2015 | Griffons | 40–28 | Limpopo Blue Bulls | HT Pelatona Projects Stadium, Welkom |
| 15:00 | Try: Martin Sithole 20', 31', 69'; Vuyo Mbotho 51', 72'; Wynand Pienaar 55'; Con: Franna du Toit 21', 52', 56', 70', 73' (5/6) | Report; Scoreboard | Try: Willie Engelbrecht 12'; Dwayne Pienaar 38'; Dean Gordon 77'; Con: Anton Beswick 13', 39' (2/3); Pen: Anton Beswick 24', 48', 60' (3/4) | Referee: Ricus van der Hoven |

Bye/s: Blue Bulls, Welwitschias

==== Round Eight ====
| 1 May 2015 | Welwitschias | 7–45 | Falcons | Hage Geingob Stadium, Windhoek |
| 20:00 | Try: Johann Tromp 42'; Con: Shaun Kaizemi 42' (1/1) | Report; Scoreboard | Try: Ernst Ladendorf 4'; Anrich Richter 12', 15'; Riaan Arends 18', 29'; Willie Odendaal 24'; Friedle Olivier 64'; Con: Jaun Kotzé 5', 12', 16', 19', 30' (5/7) | Referee: Lourens van der Merwe |

| 2 May 2015 | Leopards XV | 59–12 | Griffons | Hartbeesfontein |
| 14:30 | Try: Francois Robertse 22'; Jaco Hayward 30'; Kobus du Plessis 37'; Adri Jacobs 45', 59'; Adriaan Engelbrecht 56'; Myburgh Briers 65'; Molotsi Bouwer 71'; Con: Adriaan Engelbrecht 23', 31', 38', 46', 57', 60', 66', 72' (8/8); Pen: Adriaan Engelbrecht 50' (1/1) | Report; Scoreboard | Try: Nicky Steyn 63', 75'; Con: Louis Strydom (0/1); Wynand Pienaar 76' (1/1); Cards: Martin Sithole (yellow card) 35' to 45' | Attendance: 1,200; Referee: Tahla Ntshakaza |

| 2 May 2015 | Blue Bulls | 83–13 | Limpopo Blue Bulls | Loftus Versfeld, Pretoria |
| 16:40 | Try: Nqoba Mxoli 4'; Kobus Marais 7'; Travis Ismaiel 38', 61'; Jamba Ulengo 41', 66'; Roelof Smit 48', 53'; Kefentse Mahlo 64'; Marquit September 70'; William Small-Smith 72', 78'; Con: Kobus Marais 5', 8', 39', 42', 49', 54', 62' (7/7); Joshua Stander 71', 73', 79' (3/5); Pen: Kobus Marais 20' (1/1) | Report; Scoreboard | Try: Fanie Raseroka 31'; Con: Anton Beswick 32' (1/1); Pen: Anton Beswick 28', 46' (2/2) | Referee: AJ Jacobs |

Bye/s: Golden Lions, Pumas

==== Round Nine ====
| 8 May 2015 | Griffons | 20–36 | Golden Lions | HT Pelatona Projects Stadium, Welkom |
| 15:00 | Try: Nicky Steyn 35'; Vuyo Mbotho 38'; Tertius Maarman 53'; Norman Nelson 66'; Con: Louis Strydom (0/2); Colin Herbert (0/2) | Report; Scoreboard | Try: Jano Venter 8', 19'; Ashlon Davids 11'; Jaco van der Walt 42'; Stokkies Hanekom 51'; Ruan Ackermann 75'; Con: Jaco van der Walt 9', 12', 52' (3/6); Cards: Jacques Nel (yellow card) 79' | Referee: Stephan Geldenhuys |

| 8 May 2015 | Welwitschias | 25–33 | Leopards XV | Hage Geingob Stadium, Windhoek |
| 20:00 | Try: Nico Esterhuyse 5'; Shaun Kaizemi 20', 42'; Russell van Wyk 52'; Con: Shaun Kaizemi 21' (1/4); Pen: Shaun Kaizemi 17' (1/2); Cards: Roderique Victor (yellow card) 69' to 80' | Report; Scoreboard | Try: HP Swart 11'; Stoof Bezuidenhout 13'; Kobus du Plessis 27'; Jaco Jordaan 32'; Dane van der Westhuyzen 72'; Con: Adriaan Engelbrecht 12', 14', 28', 73' (4/5) | Attendance: 1,000; Referee: Archie Sehlako |

| 9 May 2015 | Limpopo Blue Bulls | 27–38 | Falcons | Peter Mokaba Stadium, Polokwane |
| 15:00 | Try: Andries Truter 24'; Anton Krynauw 51'; Dwayne Pienaar 63'; Tinus van Wyk 73'; Con: Anton Beswick 64', 74' (2/4); Pen: Anton Beswick 1' (1/1); Cards: Willie Engelbrecht (yellow card) 82' | Report; Scoreboard | Try: Friedle Olivier 4'; Kyle Hendricks 15', 22', 42'; Riaan Arends 46'; Johan Pretorius 55'; Con: Jaun Kotzé 5', 23', 47', 56' (4/6) | Referee: Oregopotse Rametsi |

Bye/s: Blue Bulls, Pumas

=== Southern Section ===
==== Round one ====
| 20 March 2015 | SWD Eagles | 33–17 | Free State XV | Outeniqua Park, George |
| 19:00 | Try: Ashley Buys 26'; Alshaun Bock 45', 70'; Con: Elric van Vuuren 27', 46', 71' (3/3); Pen: Elric van Vuuren 16', 33', 37', 62' (4/5) | Report; Scoreboard | Try: Peet Coetzee 8', 77'; Con: Coenie van Wyk 9' (1/1); Noël Marx 78' (1/1); Pen: Coenie van Wyk 21' (1/1); Cards: Sino Ganto (yellow card) 42' to 52' | Referee: Rodney Boneparte |

| 21 March 2015 | Eastern Province Kings | 19–27 | Griquas | Nelson Mandela Bay Stadium, Port Elizabeth |
| 15:00 | Try: Thembelani Bholi 17'; Kevin Luiters 25'; Jaco Grobler 73'; Con: Gary van Aswegen 18' (1/2); Scott van Breda 74' (1/1); Pen: Gary van Aswegen (0/1) | Report; Scoreboard | Try: Carel Greeff 14'; Steph Roberts 62'; Abrie Griesel 65'; Con: Gouws Prinsloo 15', 63', 66' (3/3); Pen: Gouws Prinsloo 39', 53' (2/3); Cards: RJ Liebenberg (yellow card) 68'; Wendal Wehr (yellow card) 71' to 78' | Referee: Tahla Ntshakaza |

| 21 March 2015 | Sharks XV | 53–0 | Border Bulldogs | Kings Park Stadium, Durban |
| 15:30 | Try: Sizo Maseko 2', 73'; Jaco van Tonder 27'; Stefan Ungerer 41', 46'; Khaya Majola 43'; Alcino Izaacs 79'; Con: Fred Zeilinga 28', 42', 44' (3/4); Lionel Cronjé 47', 74', 80' (3/3); Pen: Fred Zeilinga 10', 18' (2/2) | Report; Scoreboard | | Referee: Cwengile Jadezweni |

| 21 March 2015 | Boland Cavaliers | 10–25 | Western Province | Caledon Sports Ground, Caledon |
| 16:30 | Try: Gavin Annandale 16'; Con: Eric Zana 18' (1/1); Pen: Eric Zana 55' (1/1); Cards: Freginald Africa (yellow card) 32' to 42'; Wayne Wilschut (yellow card) 47' to 57' | Report; Scoreboard | Try: Sikhumbuzo Notshe 4', 11', 69', 77'; Con: Jean-Luc du Plessis 12' (1/4); Pen: Jean-Luc du Plessis 34' (1/1) | Referee: Jaco Pretorius |

==== Round two ====
| 27 March 2015 | SWD Eagles | 12–19 | Griquas | Outeniqua Park, George |
| 19:10 | Pen: Elric van Vuuren 5', 18', 22', 27' (4/5) | Report; Scoreboard | Try: Jaco Nepgen 33'; Con: Gouws Prinsloo 34' (1/1); Pen: Gouws Prinsloo 2', 39', 45', 75' (4/7) | Referee: Francois Pretorius |

| 27 March 2015 | Border Bulldogs | 17–27 | Eastern Province Kings | Buffalo City Stadium, East London |
| 19:10 | Try: Ntando Kebe 57'; Sipho Nofemele 73'; Con: Oliver Zono 58', 74' (2/2); Pen: Masixole Banda 32' (1/2); Oliver Zono (0/1); Cards: Wandile Putuma (yellow card) 13' to 23' | Report; Scoreboard | Try: Paul Schoeman 14', 51', 66'; Simon Kerrod 24'; Con: Gary van Aswegen 25' (1/3); Scott van Breda 67' (1/1); Pen: Gary van Aswegen 3' (1/1) | Referee: Archie Sehlako |

| 28 March 2015 | Free State XV | 52–15 | Boland Cavaliers | Clive Solomon Stadium, Heidedal |
| 15:00 | Try: Coenie van Wyk 4'; Louis Venter 15'; Reuben Johannes 24'; Louwrens Strydom 40'; Zingisa April 53'; Enver Brandt 55', 62'; Devin Oosthuizen 76'; Con: Coenie van Wyk 5', 16', 40', 54', 56', 63' (6/7); Noël Marx (0/1) | Report; Scoreboard | Try: Christian Rust 20'; Eric Zana 65'; Con: Eric Zana (0/1); Christian Rust 66' (1/1); Pen: Eric Zana 29' (1/1) | Referee: AJ Jacobs |

| 28 March 2015 | Western Province | 32–12 | Sharks XV | City Park Stadium, Athlone |
| 16:00 | Try: Rayn Smid 6'; Wilco Louw 29'; Sikhumbuzo Notshe 37'; Grant Hermanus 45'; Con: Jean-Luc du Plessis 30', 38', 46' (3/4); Pen: Jean-Luc du Plessis 15', 60' (2/2); Cards: Mathew Turner (yellow card) 74' | Report; Scoreboard | Try: Khaya Majola 33'; Paul Perez 51'; Con: Lionel Cronjé 34' (1/3) | Referee: Pro Legoete |

==== Round three ====
| 10 April 2015 | Boland Cavaliers | 34–26 | SWD Eagles | Boland Park, Worcester |
| 15:00 | Try: Wilneth Engelbrecht 1', 45'; Harlon Klaasen 23'; Edwin Sass 36', 62'; Con: Eric Zana 2', 37', 63' (3/5); Pen: Eric Zana 40' (1/2) | Report; Scoreboard | Try: Alshaun Bock 8', 74'; Hentzwill Pedro 16'; Nemo Roelofse 58'; Con: Elric van Vuuren 9', 59' (2/3); Gerrit Smith 75' (1/1) | Referee: Quinton Immelman |

| 11 April 2015 | Griquas | 37–25 | Border Bulldogs | Hartswater |
| 15:00 | Try: Rocco Jansen 5'; JW Jonker 12', 20'; Hugo Kloppers 67'; Martin Bezuidenhout 71'; Con: Clinton Swart 6', 13', 20' (3/5); Pen: Clinton Swart 2', 55' (2/2); Cards: Wiseman Kamanga (yellow card) 32'; Danie Dames (yellow card) 45' to 55' | Report; Scoreboard | Try: Johannes Jonker 17'; Sipho Nofemele 50', 75'; Con: Masixole Banda 18' (1/1); Oliver Zono 51' (1/1); Bangi Kobese (0/1); Pen: Masixole Banda 16' (1/1); Oliver Zono 31' (1/3); Cards: Yanga Xakalashe (yellow card) 65' to 75'; Onke Dubase (yellow card) 78' | Referee: Lourens van der Merwe |

| 11 April 2015 | Sharks XV | 18–35 | Free State XV | Kokstad Rugby Club, Kokstad |
| 15:30 | Try: Dan du Preez 33'; Khaya Majola 50'; Con: Inny Radebe 51' (1/2); Pen: Inny Radebe 9', 39' (2/2) | Report; Scoreboard | Try: Coenie van Wyk 20'; Vince Jobo 55', 61'; Shaun Venter 74'; Con: Coenie van Wyk 21', 56', 75' (3/4); Pen: Coenie van Wyk 26', 36', 73' (3/3) | Referee: Ben Crouse |

| 11 April 2015 | Eastern Province Kings | 13–19 | Western Province | Nelson Mandela Bay Stadium, Port Elizabeth |
| 19:00 | Try: George Whitehead 35'; Sylvian Mahuza 61'; Con: George Whitehead (0/1); Pen: Scott van Breda 49' (1/1); Cards: Martin Ferreira (yellow card) 39' to 50' | Report; Scoreboard | Try: Godlen Masimla 68'; Con: Jean-Luc du Plessis 69' (1/1); Pen: Jean-Luc du Plessis 5', 20', 38', 40' (4/4); Cards: JP Lewis (yellow card) 78' | Referee: Stephan Geldenhuys |

==== Round four ====
| 17 April 2015 | SWD Eagles | 36–13 | Sharks XV | Outeniqua Park, George |
| 19:30 | Try: Janneman Stander 4'; Kurt Haupt 28'; Alshaun Bock 47', 70'; Zandré Jordaan 51'; Con: Elric van Vuuren 4', 29', 51' (3/3); Gerrit Smith 71' (1/2); Pen: Elric van Vuuren 37' (1/2); Cards: Buran Parks (yellow card) 79' | Report; Scoreboard | Try: Tonderai Chavhanga 7'; Con: Inny Radebe 8' (1/1); Pen: Inny Radebe 17', 25' (2/3) | Referee: Pro Legoete |

| 18 April 2015 | Western Province | 34–6 | Border Bulldogs | City Park Stadium, Athlone |
| 15:00 | Try: Garth April 25'; Luke van der Smit 46'; Rayn Smid 61'; Jan de Klerk 66'; Robert du Preez 76'; Con: Jean-Luc du Plessis 47', 62' (2/3); Robert du Preez 67' (1/2); Pen: Jean-Luc du Plessis 36' (1/1) | Report; Scoreboard | Pen: Masixole Banda 20', 30' (2/2) | Referee: Oregopotse Rametsi |

| 18 April 2015 | Boland Cavaliers | 19–62 | Griquas | Smuts Ground, Velddrif |
| 16:00 | Try: Wilneth Engelbrecht 30'; Tiaan Ramat 41'; Ryno Conradie 62'; Con: Eric Zana 31', 42' (2/3); Pen: Eric Zana (0/1) | Report; Scoreboard | Try: Rocco Jansen 6', 34'; Wendal Wehr 17', 55'; Ntabeni Dukisa 43', 45', 68'; Martin Bezuidenhout 49'; Clinton Swart 76'; Con: Gouws Prinsloo 7', 44', 46', 50', 56', 69', 77' (7/9); Pen: Gouws Prinsloo 11' (1/1) | Referee: Cwengile Jadezweni |

| 18 April 2015 | Free State XV | 50–45 | Eastern Province Kings | Free State Stadium, Bloemfontein |
| 16:30 | Try: JP du Plessis 5'; Sergeal Petersen 15', 56'; Shaun Venter 25'; Joubert Engelbrecht 42'; Zingisa April 65'; Ludwig Erasmus 77'; Con: Niel Marais 6', 16', 26', 43', 57', 66' (6/6); Ludwig Erasmus (0/1); Pen: Ludwig Erasmus 76' (1/1); Cards: Shaun Venter (yellow card) 80' | Report; Scoreboard | Try: Tim Agaba 18'; Luther Obi 31'; Tim Whitehead 54', 59'; Siviwe Soyizwapi 70'; Con: Scott van Breda 19', 32', 54', 60' (4/5); Pen: Gary van Aswegen 8' (1/1); Scott van Breda 30', 63', 82' (3/4) | Referee: Quinton Immelman |

==== Round Five ====
| 24 April 2015 | Border Bulldogs | 10–14 | Free State XV | Buffalo City Stadium, East London |
| 19:00 | Try: Lindokuhle Welemu 60'; Con: Masixole Banda 61' (1/1); Pen: Masixole Banda 17' (1/3) | Report; Scoreboard | Try: Sergeal Petersen 21'; Con: Niel Marais (0/1); Pen: Niel Marais 44', 69', 79' (3/3) | Referee: Rodney Boneparte |

| 25 April 2015 | Eastern Province Kings | 10–31 | SWD Eagles | Nelson Mandela Bay Stadium, Port Elizabeth |
| 15:00 | Try: Luther Obi 20'; Simon Kerrod 80'; Con: Tony Jantjies (0/1); Hansie Graaff (0/1) | Report; Scoreboard | Try: Alshaun Bock 8'; Clinton Wagman 35'; Dwayne Kelly 72'; Con: Elric van Vuuren 9' (1/2); Gerrit Smith 73' (1/1); Pen: Elric van Vuuren 10', 15', 30' (3/3); Gerrit Smith 77' (1/1); Cards: Junior Bester (yellow card) 68' | Referee: Tahla Ntshakaza |

| 25 April 2015 | Griquas | 14–21 | Western Province | Diamantveld High School, Kimberley |
| 15:00 | Try: Martin Bezuidenhout 75'; Con: Gouws Prinsloo (0/1); Pen: Gouws Prinsloo 21', 40', 47' (3/5) | Report; Scoreboard | Try: EW Viljoen 57'; Kyle Lombard 72'; Con: Jean-Luc du Plessis 73' (1/2); Pen: Jean-Luc du Plessis 21', 63', 79' (3/3) | Referee: Stephan Geldenhuys |

| 25 April 2015 | Sharks XV | 52–12 | Boland Cavaliers | Empangeni |
| 15:30 | Try: Khaya Majola 6'; Cameron Wright 29'; Marius Louw 31', 67'; Barend Potgieter 38', 50'; Tyler Fisher 62'; Tonderai Chavhanga 72'; Con: Cameron Wright 30', 32', 51' (3/5); Sandile Kubekha 63', 68', 73' (3/3) | Report; Scoreboard | Try: Freginald Africa 1'; Edwin Sass 76'; Con: Eric Zana (0/1); Christian Rust 77' (1/1); Pen: Eric Zana (0/1); Cards: Clemen Lewis (yellow card) 26' to 37' | Attendance: 2,500; Referee: Lourens van der Merwe |

==== Round Six ====
| 2 May 2015 | Free State XV | 29–30 | Western Province | Free State Stadium, Bloemfontein |
| 14:30 | Try: Henco Venter 49'; Teunis Nieuwoudt 60'; Sino Ganto 75'; Reuben Johannes 80'; Con: Niel Marais 50', 61' (2/2); Noël Marx 81' (1/2); Pen: Niel Marais 14' (1/1) | Report; Scoreboard | Try: Kyle Lombard 6'; Tshotsho Mbovane 26'; EW Viljoen 56'; Con: Robert du Preez 6', 27', 57' (3/3); Pen: Robert du Preez 11', 47', 67' (3/3); Cards: Chris van Zyl (yellow card) 48' to 58' | Referee: Jason Jaftha |

| 2 May 2015 | Sharks XV | 24–27 | Griquas | Woodburn Stadium, Pietermaritzburg |
| 15:30 | Try: Tonderai Chavhanga 17'; Khaya Majola 35'; Marius Louw 47'; Con: Cameron Wright 18', 36', 48' (3/3); Pen: Cameron Wright 29' (1/1) | Report; Scoreboard | Try: Jono Janse van Rensburg 38'; Rocco Jansen 42'; Ntabeni Dukisa 72'; Ederies Arendse 77'; Con: Clinton Swart (0/1); Gouws Prinsloo (0/1); Dean Grant 73', 78' (2/2); Pen: Gouws Prinsloo 6' (1/3) | Attendance: 1,000; Referee: Lloyd Linton |

| 2 May 2015 | Boland Cavaliers | 10–44 | Eastern Province Kings | Central Sports Grounds, Citrusdal |
| 16:00 | Try: Granville Adams 20'; Con: Granville Adams 21' (1/1); Pen: Christian Rust (0/2); Granville Adams 38' (1/1) | Report; Scoreboard | Try: Aidon Davis 7', 31', 63'; Siviwe Soyizwapi 22'; Eital Bredenkamp 54'; Hansie Graaff 59'; Dylon Frylinck 74'; Con: Hansie Graaff 8', 32', 60' (3/7); Pen: Hansie Graaff 46' (1/1) | Attendance: 3,000; Referee: Pro Legoete |

| 2 May 2015 | SWD Eagles | 36–17 | Border Bulldogs | Albertinia |
| 16:00 | Try: Janneman Stander 4'; Zandré Jordaan 13', 45'; Kirsten Heyns 38'; Alshaun Bock 63'; Con: Elric van Vuuren 14', 39', 46' (3/4); Gerrit Smith 64' (1/1); Pen: Elric van Vuuren 19' (1/1) | Report; Scoreboard | Try: Lindokuhle Welemu 75'; Con: Masixole Banda (0/1); Pen: Masixole Banda 25', 49', 1', 17' (4/4); Cards: Athenkosi Manentsa (yellow card) 43' to 53' | Attendance: 3,200; Referee: Francois Pretorius |

==== Round Seven ====
| 8 May 2015 | Eastern Province Kings | 23–8 | Sharks XV | Nelson Mandela Bay Stadium, Port Elizabeth |
| 19:00 | Try: Luther Obi 21'; Paul Schoeman 46'; Enrico Acker 74'; Con: Hansie Graaff (0/2); Scott van Breda 75' (1/1); Pen: Hansie Graaff 6' (1/1); Scott van Breda 70' (1/1) | Report; Scoreboard | Try: Hanco Venter 23'; Con: Garth April (0/1); Pen: Garth April 15' (1/2); Cards: Paul Jordaan (yellow card) 20' to 30' | Attendance: 2,650; Referee: Cwengile Jadezweni |

| 9 May 2015 | Western Province | 27–19 | SWD Eagles | Newlands Stadium, Cape Town |
| 14:45 | Try: Tapiwa Tsomondo 7', 64'; Jaco Taute 33'; Tshotsho Mbovane 47'; Con: Robert du Preez 8', 33' (2/4); Pen: Jean-Luc du Plessis 79' (1/1) | Report; Scoreboard | Try: Leighton Eksteen 68'; Con: Elric van Vuuren 69' (1/1); Pen: Gerrit Smith 3' (1/1); Elric van Vuuren 32', 40', 74' (3/4) | Referee: Lloyd Linton |

| 9 May 2015 | Griquas | 19–18 | Free State XV | Griqua Park, Kimberley |
| 15:00 | Try: Rudi van Rooyen 36'; Con: Gouws Prinsloo 37' (1/1); Pen: Gouws Prinsloo 46' (1/4); Dean Grant 72', 75', 81' (3/3); Cards: Jono Janse van Rensburg (yellow card) 49' to 59' | Report; Scoreboard | Try: Ludwig Erasmus 20'; Alvin Brandt 77'; Con: Willie du Plessis 21' (1/2); Pen: Willie du Plessis 63' (1/1); Drop: Ludwig Erasmus 25' (1/1); Cards: Henco Venter (yellow card) 16' to 26' | Referee: Pro Legoete |

| 9 May 2015 | Border Bulldogs | 29–5 | Boland Cavaliers | Davidson Rugby Field, Alice |
| 15:30 | Try: Lundi Ralarala 2'; Makazole Mapimpi 21', 40', 43'; Con: Makazole Mapimpi 3', 40', 44' (3/4); Pen: Makazole Mapimpi 52' (1/2) | Report; Scoreboard | Try: Harlon Klaasen 65'; Con: Christian Rust (0/1) | Referee: Tahla Ntshakaza |

=== Quarter-finals ===
| 15 May 2015 | Griquas | 14–28 | Pumas | Griqua Park, Kimberley |
| 19:00 | Try: Wiseman Kamanga 62'; AJ le Roux 73'; Con: Dean Grant 62', 74' (2/2); Pen: Dean Grant (0/1) | Report; Scoreboard | Try: Bernado Botha 47'; Jason Fraser 67'; Johan Herbst 77'; Con: JC Roos 67' (1/2); Justin van Staden 78' (1/1); Pen: JC Roos 5', 14', 44' (3/4) | Referee: Lourens van der Merwe |

| 15 May 2015 | Blue Bulls | 44–21 | Free State XV | Loftus Versfeld, Pretoria |
| 19:10 | Try: Wiaan Liebenberg 12'; William Small-Smith 20', 49', 60'; Tian Schoeman 80'; Con: Tian Schoeman 13', 21', 50', 61' (4/4); Kobus Marais 80' (1/1); Pen: Tian Schoeman 32', 45', 57' (3/4) | Report; Scoreboard | Try: Gerhard Olivier 53'; Joubert Engelbrecht 73'; Con: Willie du Plessis (0/1); Niel Marais 74' (1/1); Pen: Willie du Plessis 4', 17', 27' (3/5); Ludwig Erasmus (0/1) | Referee: Rodney Boneparte |

| 16 May 2015 | Golden Lions | 29–21 | SWD Eagles | Ellis Park Stadium, Johannesburg |
| 14:10 | Try: Jacques Nel 12'; Stokkies Hanekom 45'; Con: Marnitz Boshoff 13', 45' (2/2); Pen: Marnitz Boshoff 47', 55', 59', 69' (4/5); Drop: Marnitz Boshoff 21' (1/1); Cards: JP du Preez (yellow card) 71' | Report; Scoreboard | Try: Martin du Toit 32'; Kirsten Heyns 37', 50'; Con: Elric van Vuuren 33', 38', 51' (3/3); Pen: Elric van Vuuren (0/2); Cards: Ashley Buys (yellow card) 21' to 34' | Referee: Oregopotse Rametsi |

| 16 May 2015 | Western Province | 47–22 | Leopards XV | City Park Stadium, Athlone |
| 15:30 | Try: Godlen Masimla 4'; Justin Benn 17', 42'; Robert du Preez 32'; Jaco Taute 62'; Tapiwa Tsomondo 73'; EW Viljoen 76'; Con: Jean-Luc du Plessis 5', 18', 33', 63', 74', 77' (6/7); Pen: Jean-Luc du Plessis (0/1) | Report; Scoreboard | Try: Sergio Torrens 21', 26'; Rhyno Smith 36'; Con: Adriaan Engelbrecht 22', 27' (2/3); Pen: Adriaan Engelbrecht 46' (1/2) | Referee: Jaco Kotze |

=== Semi-finals ===
| 22 May 2015 | Golden Lions | 20–43 | Pumas | Ellis Park Stadium, Johannesburg |
| 17:00 | Try: Damian Engledoe 45'; Rohan Janse van Rensburg 50'; Con: Kobus de Kock 46', 51' (2/2); Pen: Kobus de Kock 40' (1/2); Drop: Lohan Jacobs 23' (1/1) | Report; Scoreboard | Try: Bernado Botha 15'; Lambert Groenewald 26'; Rudi Mathee 29'; Marnus Schoeman 60', 72'; Con: JC Roos 16', 27', 73' (3/5); Pen: JC Roos 6', 22', 71', 80' (4/4); Cards: Trompie Pretorius (yellow card) 42' to 53' | Referee: Francois Pretorius |

| 23 May 2015 | Western Province | 10–6 | Blue Bulls | Newlands Stadium, Cape Town |
| 16:30 | Try: Sikhumbuzo Notshe 32'; Con: Jean-Luc du Plessis 33' (1/1); Pen: Jean-Luc du Plessis 3' (1/1); Robert du Preez (0/1) | Report; Scoreboard | Pen: Kobus Marais 18', 61' (2/5) | Referee: Pro Legoete |

=== Final ===
| 30 May 2015 | Western Province | 7–24 | Pumas | Newlands Stadium, Cape Town |
| 14:10 | Try: penalty try 52'; Con: Robert du Preez 53' (1/1); Pen: Robert du Preez (0/1) | Report; Scoreboard | Try: Marnus Schoeman 17', 79'; Rudi Mathee 31'; Khwezi Mona 37'; Con: JC Roos 32', 38' (2/3); Justin van Staden (0/1); Pen: JC Roos (0/2); Cards: Marnus Schoeman (yellow card) 52' to 64' | Referee: Quinton Immelman |

== Honours ==
The honour roll for the 2015 Vodacom Cup was as follows:

2015 Vodacom Cup Honours
| Champions: | Pumas (1st title) |
| Top Try Scorer: | Alshaun Bock, SWD Eagles (8) |
| Top Points Scorer: | JC Roos, Pumas (118) |

== Players ==
=== Player statistics ===
The following table contain points which were scored in the 2015 Vodacom Cup:

Top Ten points scorers
| No | Player | Team | T | C | P | DG | Pts |
|---|---|---|---|---|---|---|---|
| 1 | JC Roos | Pumas | 2 | 24 | 20 | 0 | 118 |
| 2 | Kobus Marais | Blue Bulls | 2 | 21 | 11 | 0 | 85 |
| 3 | Elric van Vuuren | SWD Eagles | 0 | 16 | 16 | 0 | 80 |
| 4 | Jean-Luc du Plessis | Western Province | 0 | 15 | 13 | 0 | 69 |
| 5 | Jaun Kotzé | Falcons | 1 | 23 | 4 | 0 | 63 |
| 6 | Gouws Prinsloo | Griquas | 0 | 12 | 12 | 0 | 60 |
| 7 | Anton Beswick | Limpopo Blue Bulls | 0 | 8 | 13 | 0 | 55 |
| 7 | Ashlon Davids | Golden Lions | 3 | 14 | 4 | 0 | 55 |
| 9 | Coenie van Wyk | Free State XV | 2 | 10 | 4 | 0 | 42 |
| 10 | Alshaun Bock | SWD Eagles | 8 | 0 | 0 | 0 | 40 |

Other points scorers
| No | Player | Team | T | C | P | DG | Pts |
|---|---|---|---|---|---|---|---|
| 11 | Adriaan Engelbrecht | Leopards XV | 1 | 14 | 2 | 0 | 39 |
| 12 | Shaun Kaizemi | Welwitschias | 2 | 7 | 4 | 0 | 36 |
| 13 | Marnus Schoeman | Pumas | 7 | 0 | 0 | 0 | 35 |
| 14 | Kobus du Plessis | Leopards XV | 2 | 6 | 4 | 0 | 34 |
| 14 | Jaco van der Walt | Golden Lions | 1 | 10 | 3 | 0 | 34 |
| 16 | Robert du Preez | Western Province | 2 | 7 | 3 | 0 | 33 |
| 17 | Masixole Banda | Border Bulldogs | 0 | 2 | 9 | 0 | 31 |
| 18 | Riaan Arends | Falcons | 6 | 0 | 0 | 0 | 30 |
| 18 | Kefentse Mahlo | Blue Bulls | 6 | 0 | 0 | 0 | 30 |
| 18 | Niel Marais | Free State XV | 0 | 9 | 4 | 0 | 30 |
| 18 | Sikhumbuzo Notshe | Western Province | 6 | 0 | 0 | 0 | 30 |
| 18 | Anrich Richter | Falcons | 6 | 0 | 0 | 0 | 30 |
| 18 | Martin Sithole | Griffons | 6 | 0 | 0 | 0 | 30 |
| 18 | Justin van Staden | Pumas | 0 | 9 | 4 | 0 | 30 |
| 25 | Scott van Breda | Eastern Province Kings | 0 | 7 | 5 | 0 | 29 |
| 26 | Eric Zana | Boland Cavaliers | 1 | 6 | 3 | 0 | 26 |
| 27 | Jaco Hayward | Leopards XV | 5 | 0 | 0 | 0 | 25 |
| 27 | Khaya Majola | Sharks XV | 5 | 0 | 0 | 0 | 25 |
| 27 | Marquit September | Blue Bulls | 5 | 0 | 0 | 0 | 25 |
| 27 | William Small-Smith | Blue Bulls | 5 | 0 | 0 | 0 | 25 |
| 27 | Roelof Smit | Blue Bulls | 5 | 0 | 0 | 0 | 25 |
| 27 | Nicky Steyn | Griffons | 5 | 0 | 0 | 0 | 25 |
| 27 | Louis Strydom | Griffons | 0 | 5 | 5 | 0 | 25 |
| 27 | Jamba Ulengo | Blue Bulls | 5 | 0 | 0 | 0 | 25 |
| 35 | Makazole Mapimpi | Border Bulldogs | 3 | 3 | 1 | 0 | 24 |
| 36 | Johann Tromp | Welwitschias | 4 | 0 | 1 | 0 | 23 |
| 37 | Tian Schoeman | Blue Bulls | 1 | 4 | 3 | 0 | 22 |
| 38 | Bernado Botha | Pumas | 4 | 0 | 0 | 0 | 20 |
| 38 | Kobus de Kock | Golden Lions | 2 | 2 | 2 | 0 | 20 |
| 38 | Stephan de Wit | Golden Lions | 4 | 0 | 0 | 0 | 20 |
| 38 | Ntabeni Dukisa | Griquas | 4 | 0 | 0 | 0 | 20 |
| 38 | Travis Ismaiel | Blue Bulls | 4 | 0 | 0 | 0 | 20 |
| 38 | Rocco Jansen | Griquas | 4 | 0 | 0 | 0 | 20 |
| 38 | Ruaan Lerm | Golden Lions | 4 | 0 | 0 | 0 | 20 |
| 38 | Vuyo Mbotho | Griffons | 4 | 0 | 0 | 0 | 20 |
| 38 | Paul Schoeman | Eastern Province Kings | 4 | 0 | 0 | 0 | 20 |
| 38 | Sergio Torrens | Leopards XV | 4 | 0 | 0 | 0 | 20 |
| 38 | Jano Venter | Golden Lions | 4 | 0 | 0 | 0 | 20 |
| 38 | Cameron Wright | Sharks XV | 1 | 6 | 1 | 0 | 20 |
| 50 | Marnitz Boshoff | Golden Lions | 0 | 2 | 4 | 1 | 19 |
| 51 | Warren Gilbert | Leopards XV | 1 | 3 | 2 | 0 | 17 |
| 51 | Hansie Graaff | Eastern Province Kings | 1 | 3 | 2 | 0 | 17 |
| 51 | Dean Grant | Griquas | 0 | 4 | 3 | 0 | 17 |
| 51 | Clinton Swart | Griquas | 1 | 3 | 2 | 0 | 17 |
| 55 | Franna du Toit | Griffons | 0 | 8 | 0 | 0 | 16 |
| 55 | Ludwig Erasmus | Free State XV | 2 | 0 | 1 | 1 | 16 |
| 55 | Inny Radebe | Sharks XV | 0 | 2 | 4 | 0 | 16 |
| 58 | Martin Bezuidenhout | Griquas | 3 | 0 | 0 | 0 | 15 |
| 58 | Tonderai Chavhanga | Sharks XV | 3 | 0 | 0 | 0 | 15 |
| 58 | Aidon Davis | Eastern Province Kings | 3 | 0 | 0 | 0 | 15 |
| 58 | Wilneth Engelbrecht | Boland Cavaliers | 3 | 0 | 0 | 0 | 15 |
| 58 | Kyle Hendricks | Falcons | 3 | 0 | 0 | 0 | 15 |
| 58 | Kirsten Heyns | SWD Eagles | 3 | 0 | 0 | 0 | 15 |
| 58 | Ruwellyn Isbell | Pumas | 3 | 0 | 0 | 0 | 15 |
| 58 | Zandré Jordaan | SWD Eagles | 3 | 0 | 0 | 0 | 15 |
| 58 | Marius Louw | Sharks XV | 3 | 0 | 0 | 0 | 15 |
| 58 | Rudi Mathee | Pumas | 3 | 0 | 0 | 0 | 15 |
| 58 | Jacques Nel | Golden Lions | 3 | 0 | 0 | 0 | 15 |
| 58 | Justin Nel | Welwitschias | 3 | 0 | 0 | 0 | 15 |
| 58 | Sipho Nofemele | Border Bulldogs | 3 | 0 | 0 | 0 | 15 |
| 58 | Luther Obi | Eastern Province Kings | 3 | 0 | 0 | 0 | 15 |
| 58 | Friedle Olivier | Falcons | 3 | 0 | 0 | 0 | 15 |
| 58 | Sergeal Petersen | Free State XV | 3 | 0 | 0 | 0 | 15 |
| 58 | Arno Poley | Falcons | 3 | 0 | 0 | 0 | 15 |
| 58 | Marcello Sampson | Pumas | 3 | 0 | 0 | 0 | 15 |
| 58 | Edwin Sass | Boland Cavaliers | 3 | 0 | 0 | 0 | 15 |
| 58 | Tapiwa Tsomondo | Western Province | 3 | 0 | 0 | 0 | 15 |
| 58 | Arno van Wyk | Blue Bulls | 3 | 0 | 0 | 0 | 15 |
| 58 | EW Viljoen | Western Province | 3 | 0 | 0 | 0 | 15 |
| 80 | Willie du Plessis | Free State XV | 0 | 1 | 4 | 0 | 14 |
| 80 | Damian Engledoe | Golden Lions | 2 | 2 | 0 | 0 | 14 |
| 80 | Wynand Pienaar | Griffons | 2 | 2 | 0 | 0 | 14 |
| 80 | Gerrit Smith | SWD Eagles | 0 | 4 | 2 | 0 | 14 |
| 84 | Warren Potgieter | Golden Lions | 0 | 5 | 1 | 0 | 13 |
| 85 | Fred Zeilinga | Sharks XV | 0 | 3 | 2 | 0 | 12 |
| 86 | Granville Adams | Boland Cavaliers | 1 | 1 | 1 | 0 | 10 |
| 86 | Zingisa April | Free State XV | 2 | 0 | 0 | 0 | 10 |
| 86 | Justin Benn | Western Province | 2 | 0 | 0 | 0 | 10 |
| 86 | Stoof Bezuidenhout | Leopards XV | 2 | 0 | 0 | 0 | 10 |
| 86 | Enver Brandt | Free State XV | 2 | 0 | 0 | 0 | 10 |
| 86 | Peet Coetzee | Free State XV | 2 | 0 | 0 | 0 | 10 |
| 86 | Bobby de Wee | Golden Lions | 2 | 0 | 0 | 0 | 10 |
| 86 | Corniel Els | Blue Bulls | 2 | 0 | 0 | 0 | 10 |
| 86 | Joubert Engelbrecht | Free State XV | 2 | 0 | 0 | 0 | 10 |
| 86 | Jason Fraser | Pumas | 2 | 0 | 0 | 0 | 10 |
| 86 | Lambert Groenewald | Pumas | 2 | 0 | 0 | 0 | 10 |
| 86 | Stokkies Hanekom | Golden Lions | 2 | 0 | 0 | 0 | 10 |
| 86 | Adri Jacobs | Leopards XV | 2 | 0 | 0 | 0 | 10 |
| 86 | Vincent Jobo | Free State XV | 2 | 0 | 0 | 0 | 10 |
| 86 | Reuben Johannes | Free State XV | 2 | 0 | 0 | 0 | 10 |
| 86 | JW Jonker | Griquas | 2 | 0 | 0 | 0 | 10 |
| 86 | Simon Kerrod | Eastern Province Kings | 2 | 0 | 0 | 0 | 10 |
| 86 | Harlon Klaasen | Boland Cavaliers | 2 | 0 | 0 | 0 | 10 |
| 86 | Ernst Ladendorf | Falcons | 2 | 0 | 0 | 0 | 10 |
| 86 | Juan Language | Leopards XV | 2 | 0 | 0 | 0 | 10 |
| 86 | Kyle Lombard | Western Province | 2 | 0 | 0 | 0 | 10 |
| 86 | Wilmaure Louw | Pumas | 2 | 0 | 0 | 0 | 10 |
| 86 | Malcolm Marx | Golden Lions | 2 | 0 | 0 | 0 | 10 |
| 86 | Godlen Masimla | Western Province | 2 | 0 | 0 | 0 | 10 |
| 86 | Sizo Maseko | Sharks XV | 2 | 0 | 0 | 0 | 10 |
| 86 | Tshotsho Mbovane | Western Province | 2 | 0 | 0 | 0 | 10 |
| 86 | Dwayne Pienaar | Limpopo Blue Bulls | 2 | 0 | 0 | 0 | 10 |
| 86 | Barend Potgieter | Sharks XV | 2 | 0 | 0 | 0 | 10 |
| 86 | Fanie Raseroka | Limpopo Blue Bulls | 2 | 0 | 0 | 0 | 10 |
| 86 | Brian Shabangu | Pumas | 2 | 0 | 0 | 0 | 10 |
| 86 | Rayn Smid | Western Province | 2 | 0 | 0 | 0 | 10 |
| 86 | Siviwe Soyizwapi | Eastern Province Kings | 2 | 0 | 0 | 0 | 10 |
| 86 | Janneman Stander | SWD Eagles | 2 | 0 | 0 | 0 | 10 |
| 86 | Heinrich Steyl | Pumas | 2 | 0 | 0 | 0 | 10 |
| 86 | Jaco Taute | Western Province | 2 | 0 | 0 | 0 | 10 |
| 86 | Stefan Ungerer | Sharks XV | 2 | 0 | 0 | 0 | 10 |
| 86 | Gary van Aswegen | Eastern Province Kings | 0 | 2 | 2 | 0 | 10 |
| 86 | Schalk van der Merwe | Golden Lions | 2 | 0 | 0 | 0 | 10 |
| 86 | Andrew van Wyk | Falcons | 2 | 0 | 0 | 0 | 10 |
| 86 | Russell van Wyk | Welwitschias | 2 | 0 | 0 | 0 | 10 |
| 86 | Shaun Venter | Free State XV | 2 | 0 | 0 | 0 | 10 |
| 86 | Wendal Wehr | Griquas | 2 | 0 | 0 | 0 | 10 |
| 86 | Lindokuhle Welemu | Border Bulldogs | 2 | 0 | 0 | 0 | 10 |
| 86 | Tim Whitehead | Eastern Province Kings | 2 | 0 | 0 | 0 | 10 |
| 130 | Tinus de Beer | Blue Bulls | 0 | 3 | 1 | 0 | 9 |
| 130 | Christian Rust | Boland Cavaliers | 1 | 2 | 0 | 0 | 9 |
| 130 | Oliver Zono | Border Bulldogs | 0 | 3 | 1 | 0 | 9 |
| 133 | Garth April (Note: Garth April is erroneously not listed in the points scorer list, probably due to him scoring points for two different teams during the competition.) | Western Province / Sharks XV | 1 | 0 | 1 | 0 | 8 |
| 133 | Lionel Cronjé | Sharks XV | 0 | 4 | 0 | 0 | 8 |
| 133 | Lohan Jacobs | Golden Lions | 1 | 0 | 0 | 1 | 8 |
| 136 | Sandile Kubekha | Sharks XV | 0 | 3 | 0 | 0 | 6 |
| 136 | Joshua Stander | Blue Bulls | 0 | 3 | 0 | 0 | 6 |
| 138 | Enrico Acker | Eastern Province Kings | 1 | 0 | 0 | 0 | 5 |
| 138 | Ruan Ackermann | Golden Lions | 1 | 0 | 0 | 0 | 5 |
| 138 | Freginald Africa | Boland Cavaliers | 1 | 0 | 0 | 0 | 5 |
| 138 | Tim Agaba | Eastern Province Kings | 1 | 0 | 0 | 0 | 5 |
| 138 | Jacques Alberts | Falcons | 1 | 0 | 0 | 0 | 5 |
| 138 | Gavin Annandale | Boland Cavaliers | 1 | 0 | 0 | 0 | 5 |
| 138 | Ederies Arendse | Griquas | 1 | 0 | 0 | 0 | 5 |
| 138 | Wilmar Arnoldi | Leopards XV | 1 | 0 | 0 | 0 | 5 |
| 138 | JW Bell | Pumas | 1 | 0 | 0 | 0 | 5 |
| 138 | Thembelani Bholi | Eastern Province Kings | 1 | 0 | 0 | 0 | 5 |
| 138 | Arno Botha | Blue Bulls | 1 | 0 | 0 | 0 | 5 |
| 138 | Jaco Bouwer | Pumas | 1 | 0 | 0 | 0 | 5 |
| 138 | Molotsi Bouwer | Leopards XV | 1 | 0 | 0 | 0 | 5 |
| 138 | Alvin Brandt | Free State XV | 1 | 0 | 0 | 0 | 5 |
| 138 | Eital Bredenkamp | Eastern Province Kings | 1 | 0 | 0 | 0 | 5 |
| 138 | Myburgh Briers | Leopards XV | 1 | 0 | 0 | 0 | 5 |
| 138 | Cyle Brink | Golden Lions | 1 | 0 | 0 | 0 | 5 |
| 138 | Ashley Buys | SWD Eagles | 1 | 0 | 0 | 0 | 5 |
| 138 | Ryno Conradie | Boland Cavaliers | 1 | 0 | 0 | 0 | 5 |
| 138 | Jan de Klerk | Western Province | 1 | 0 | 0 | 0 | 5 |
| 138 | Thomas Dreyer | Leopards XV | 1 | 0 | 0 | 0 | 5 |
| 138 | JP du Plessis | Free State XV | 1 | 0 | 0 | 0 | 5 |
| 138 | Dan du Preez | Sharks XV | 1 | 0 | 0 | 0 | 5 |
| 138 | François du Toit | Pumas | 1 | 0 | 0 | 0 | 5 |
| 138 | Martin du Toit | SWD Eagles | 1 | 0 | 0 | 0 | 5 |
| 138 | Leighton Eksteen | SWD Eagles | 1 | 0 | 0 | 0 | 5 |
| 138 | Heinrich Els | Limpopo Blue Bulls | 1 | 0 | 0 | 0 | 5 |
| 138 | Willie Engelbrecht | Limpopo Blue Bulls | 1 | 0 | 0 | 0 | 5 |
| 138 | Nico Esterhuyse | Welwitschias | 1 | 0 | 0 | 0 | 5 |
| 138 | Marnus Erasmus | Limpopo Blue Bulls | 1 | 0 | 0 | 0 | 5 |
| 138 | Tyler Fisher | Sharks XV | 1 | 0 | 0 | 0 | 5 |
| 138 | Dylon Frylinck | Eastern Province Kings | 1 | 0 | 0 | 0 | 5 |
| 138 | Sino Ganto | Free State XV | 1 | 0 | 0 | 0 | 5 |
| 138 | Warrick Gelant | Blue Bulls | 1 | 0 | 0 | 0 | 5 |
| 138 | Dean Gordon | Limpopo Blue Bulls | 1 | 0 | 0 | 0 | 5 |
| 138 | Carel Greeff | Griquas | 1 | 0 | 0 | 0 | 5 |
| 138 | Abrie Griesel | Griquas | 1 | 0 | 0 | 0 | 5 |
| 138 | Jaco Grobler | Eastern Province Kings | 1 | 0 | 0 | 0 | 5 |
| 138 | Boetie Groenewald | Griffons | 1 | 0 | 0 | 0 | 5 |
| 138 | Kurt Haupt | SWD Eagles | 1 | 0 | 0 | 0 | 5 |
| 138 | Johan Herbst | Pumas | 1 | 0 | 0 | 0 | 5 |
| 138 | Grant Hermanus | Western Province | 1 | 0 | 0 | 0 | 5 |
| 138 | Alwyn Hollenbach | Golden Lions | 1 | 0 | 0 | 0 | 5 |
| 138 | Alcino Izaacs | Sharks XV | 1 | 0 | 0 | 0 | 5 |
| 138 | Grant Janke | Falcons | 1 | 0 | 0 | 0 | 5 |
| 138 | Jono Janse van Rensburg | Griquas | 1 | 0 | 0 | 0 | 5 |
| 138 | Rohan Janse van Rensburg | Golden Lions | 1 | 0 | 0 | 0 | 5 |
| 138 | Johannes Jonker | Border Bulldogs | 1 | 0 | 0 | 0 | 5 |
| 138 | Jaco Jordaan | Leopards XV | 1 | 0 | 0 | 0 | 5 |
| 138 | Wiseman Kamanga | Griquas | 1 | 0 | 0 | 0 | 5 |
| 138 | Ntando Kebe | Border Bulldogs | 1 | 0 | 0 | 0 | 5 |
| 138 | Dwayne Kelly | SWD Eagles | 1 | 0 | 0 | 0 | 5 |
| 138 | Hugo Kloppers | Griquas | 1 | 0 | 0 | 0 | 5 |
| 138 | Anton Krynauw | Limpopo Blue Bulls | 1 | 0 | 0 | 0 | 5 |
| 138 | AJ le Roux | Griquas | 1 | 0 | 0 | 0 | 5 |
| 138 | Wiaan Liebenberg | Blue Bulls | 1 | 0 | 0 | 0 | 5 |
| 138 | Wilco Louw | Western Province | 1 | 0 | 0 | 0 | 5 |
| 138 | Kevin Luiters | Eastern Province Kings | 1 | 0 | 0 | 0 | 5 |
| 138 | Tertius Maarman | Griffons | 1 | 0 | 0 | 0 | 5 |
| 138 | Thabo Mabuza | Golden Lions | 1 | 0 | 0 | 0 | 5 |
| 138 | Sylvian Mahuza | Eastern Province Kings | 1 | 0 | 0 | 0 | 5 |
| 138 | Bren Marais | Griffons | 1 | 0 | 0 | 0 | 5 |
| 138 | Christiaan Meyer | Golden Lions | 1 | 0 | 0 | 0 | 5 |
| 138 | Khwezi Mona | Pumas | 1 | 0 | 0 | 0 | 5 |
| 138 | Alvino Montjies | Leopards XV | 1 | 0 | 0 | 0 | 5 |
| 138 | Dean Muir | Falcons | 1 | 0 | 0 | 0 | 5 |
| 138 | Nqoba Mxoli | Blue Bulls | 1 | 0 | 0 | 0 | 5 |
| 138 | Jacques Nell | Welwitschias | 1 | 0 | 0 | 0 | 5 |
| 138 | Norman Nelson | Griffons | 1 | 0 | 0 | 0 | 5 |
| 138 | Jaco Nepgen | Griquas | 1 | 0 | 0 | 0 | 5 |
| 138 | Teunis Nieuwoudt | Free State XV | 1 | 0 | 0 | 0 | 5 |
| 138 | Ossie Nortjé | Griffons | 1 | 0 | 0 | 0 | 5 |
| 138 | Sino Nyoka | Pumas | 1 | 0 | 0 | 0 | 5 |
| 138 | Willie Odendaal | Falcons | 1 | 0 | 0 | 0 | 5 |
| 138 | Gerhard Olivier | Free State XV | 1 | 0 | 0 | 0 | 5 |
| 138 | Devin Oosthuizen | Free State XV | 1 | 0 | 0 | 0 | 5 |
| 138 | Marvin Orie | Blue Bulls | 1 | 0 | 0 | 0 | 5 |
| 138 | Hentzwill Pedro | SWD Eagles | 1 | 0 | 0 | 0 | 5 |
| 138 | Paul Perez | Sharks XV | 1 | 0 | 0 | 0 | 5 |
| 138 | Johan Pretorius | Falcons | 1 | 0 | 0 | 0 | 5 |
| 138 | Mark Pretorius | Golden Lions | 1 | 0 | 0 | 0 | 5 |
| 138 | Trompie Pretorius | Pumas | 1 | 0 | 0 | 0 | 5 |
| 138 | Lundi Ralarala | Border Bulldogs | 1 | 0 | 0 | 0 | 5 |
| 138 | Tiaan Ramat | Boland Cavaliers | 1 | 0 | 0 | 0 | 5 |
| 138 | Mark Richards | Golden Lions | 1 | 0 | 0 | 0 | 5 |
| 138 | Steph Roberts | Griquas | 1 | 0 | 0 | 0 | 5 |
| 138 | Francois Robertse | Leopards XV | 1 | 0 | 0 | 0 | 5 |
| 138 | Nemo Roelofse | SWD Eagles | 1 | 0 | 0 | 0 | 5 |
| 138 | Ramone Samuels | Golden Lions | 1 | 0 | 0 | 0 | 5 |
| 138 | Chris Schoonraad | Leopards XV | 1 | 0 | 0 | 0 | 5 |
| 138 | Hennie Skorbinski | Pumas | 1 | 0 | 0 | 0 | 5 |
| 138 | Rhyno Smith | Leopards XV | 1 | 0 | 0 | 0 | 5 |
| 138 | Frikkie Spies | Pumas | 1 | 0 | 0 | 0 | 5 |
| 138 | Jade Stighling | Blue Bulls | 1 | 0 | 0 | 0 | 5 |
| 138 | Louwrens Strydom | Free State XV | 1 | 0 | 0 | 0 | 5 |
| 138 | HP Swart | Leopards XV | 1 | 0 | 0 | 0 | 5 |
| 138 | Andries Truter | Limpopo Blue Bulls | 1 | 0 | 0 | 0 | 5 |
| 138 | PJ Uys | Leopards XV | 1 | 0 | 0 | 0 | 5 |
| 138 | Joe van der Hoogt | Griffons | 1 | 0 | 0 | 0 | 5 |
| 138 | Luke van der Smit | Western Province | 1 | 0 | 0 | 0 | 5 |
| 138 | Nardus van der Walt | Blue Bulls | 1 | 0 | 0 | 0 | 5 |
| 138 | Dane van der Westhuyzen | Leopards XV | 1 | 0 | 0 | 0 | 5 |
| 138 | Reynier van Rooyen | Pumas | 1 | 0 | 0 | 0 | 5 |
| 138 | Rudi van Rooyen | Griquas | 1 | 0 | 0 | 0 | 5 |
| 138 | Jaco van Tonder | Sharks XV | 1 | 0 | 0 | 0 | 5 |
| 138 | Tinus van Wyk | Limpopo Blue Bulls | 1 | 0 | 0 | 0 | 5 |
| 138 | Hanco Venter | Sharks XV | 1 | 0 | 0 | 0 | 5 |
| 138 | Henco Venter | Free State XV | 1 | 0 | 0 | 0 | 5 |
| 138 | Louis Venter | Free State XV | 1 | 0 | 0 | 0 | 5 |
| 138 | Anthony Volmink | Golden Lions | 1 | 0 | 0 | 0 | 5 |
| 138 | Peet Vorster | Limpopo Blue Bulls | 1 | 0 | 0 | 0 | 5 |
| 138 | Clinton Wagman | SWD Eagles | 1 | 0 | 0 | 0 | 5 |
| 138 | Stefan Watermeyer | Pumas | 1 | 0 | 0 | 0 | 5 |
| 138 | George Whitehead | Eastern Province Kings | 1 | 0 | 0 | 0 | 5 |
| 138 | Percy Williams | Leopards XV | 1 | 0 | 0 | 0 | 5 |
| 253 | Noël Marx | Free State XV | 0 | 2 | 0 | 0 | 4 |
| — | penalty try | Pumas | 1 | 0 | 0 | 0 | 5 |
| — | penalty try | Western Province | 1 | 0 | 0 | 0 | 5 |
* Legend: T = Tries, C = Conversions, P = Penalties, DG = Drop Goals, Pts = Points.

=== Discipline ===
The following table contains all the cards handed out during the tournament:

Sendings-off and multiple sin-binnings
| Player | Team | Sent off (straight red) | Temporarily suspended |
|---|---|---|---|
| Frans Sisita | Griffons | 1 | 0 |
| Roderique Victor | Welwitschias | 0 | 2 |

Single sin-binnings
| Player | Team | Sent off (straight red) | Temporarily suspended |
|---|---|---|---|
| Freginald Africa | Boland Cavaliers | 0 | 1 |
| Jacques Alberts | Falcons | 0 | 1 |
| Junior Bester | SWD Eagles | 0 | 1 |
| Bernado Botha | Pumas | 0 | 1 |
| Ashley Buys | SWD Eagles | 0 | 1 |
| Danie Dames | Griquas | 0 | 1 |
| Ashlon Davids | Golden Lions | 0 | 1 |
| Onke Dubase | Border Bulldogs | 0 | 1 |
| JP du Preez | Golden Lions | 0 | 1 |
| Willie Engelbrecht | Limpopo Blue Bulls | 0 | 1 |
| Jaco Engels | Welwitschias | 0 | 1 |
| Martin Ferreira | Eastern Province Kings | 0 | 1 |
| Sino Ganto | Free State XV | 0 | 1 |
| Grant Janke | Falcons | 0 | 1 |
| Jono Janse van Rensburg | Griquas | 0 | 1 |
| Paul Jordaan | Sharks XV | 0 | 1 |
| Wiseman Kamanga | Griquas | 0 | 1 |
| Juan Language | Leopards XV | 0 | 1 |
| Ruaan Lerm | Golden Lions | 0 | 1 |
| Clemen Lewis | Boland Cavaliers | 0 | 1 |
| JP Lewis | Western Province | 0 | 1 |
| RJ Liebenberg | Griquas | 0 | 1 |
| MB Lusaseni | Golden Lions | 0 | 1 |
| Kefentse Mahlo | Blue Bulls | 0 | 1 |
| Athenkosi Manentsa | Border Bulldogs | 0 | 1 |
| Malcolm Marx | Golden Lions | 0 | 1 |
| Jacques Momberg | Pumas | 0 | 1 |
| Dwane Morrison | Limpopo Blue Bulls | 0 | 1 |
| Jacques Nel | Golden Lions | 0 | 1 |
| Marvin Orie | Blue Bulls | 0 | 1 |
| Buran Parks | SWD Eagles | 0 | 1 |
| Trompie Pretorius | Pumas | 0 | 1 |
| Wandile Putuma | Border Bulldogs | 0 | 1 |
| Marnus Schoeman | Pumas | 0 | 1 |
| Pieter Scholtz | Golden Lions | 0 | 1 |
| Martin Sithole | Griffons | 0 | 1 |
| Mathew Turner | Western Province | 0 | 1 |
| Jamba Ulengo | Blue Bulls | 0 | 1 |
| PJ Uys | Leopards XV | 0 | 1 |
| Chris van Zyl | Western Province | 0 | 1 |
| Henco Venter | Free State XV | 0 | 1 |
| Shaun Venter | Free State XV | 0 | 1 |
| Wendal Wehr | Griquas | 0 | 1 |
| Wayne Wilschut | Boland Cavaliers | 0 | 1 |
| Yanga Xakalashe | Border Bulldogs | 0 | 1 |
* Legend: (red card) = Sent off, (yellow card) = Sin-binned

== Referees ==
The following referees officiated matches in the 2015 Vodacom Cup:

- Rodney Boneparte
- Ben Crouse
- Stephan Geldenhuys
- Quinton Immelman
- AJ Jacobs
- Cwengile Jadezweni
- Jason Jaftha
- Jaco Kotze
- Pro Legoete
- Lloyd Linton
- Tahla Ntshakaza
- Francois Pretorius
- Jaco Pretorius
- Oregopotse Rametsi
- Archie Sehlako
- Ricus van der Hoven
- Lourens van der Merwe
- Kurt Weaver

== See also ==
- 2015 Currie Cup Premier Division
- 2015 Currie Cup qualification
- 2015 Currie Cup First Division
- 2015 Under-21 Provincial Championship Group A
- 2015 Under-21 Provincial Championship Group B
- 2015 Under-19 Provincial Championship Group A
- 2015 Under-19 Provincial Championship Group B
