= Kobus Marais (rugby union) =

South African rugby union player (born 1994)

- Full name: Jacobus Johannes Marais
- Born: 5 July 1994 (age 32) Richards Bay, South Africa
- Height: 1.83 m (6 ft 0 in)
- Weight: 94 kg (207 lb; 14 st 11 lb)
- School: Hoërskool Ben Viljoen, Groblersdal / Hoërskool Waterkloof, Pretoria

Rugby union career
- Position: Fly-half
- Current team: Pumas
Youth career
- 2007–2011: Limpopo Blue Bulls
- 2013–2015: Blue Bulls
Amateur team(s)
Years	Team	Apps	(Points)
2014	UP Tuks	0	(0)
Senior career
Years	Team	Apps	(Points)
2013–2015	Blue Bulls	11	(85)
2016	Eastern Province Kings	4	(21)
2017–2020	Pumas	30	(213)
2020-21	Strela		
2021	Вerre		
2022-	Strela		
- Correct as of 8 September 2019

Jacobus Johannes Marais (born 5 July 1994) is a South African rugby union player for the Pumas in the Currie Cup and in the Rugby Challenge. His regular position is fly-half.

== Rugby career ==
=== 2007–2012: Schoolboy rugby ===
Marais was born in Richards Bay in KwaZulu-Natal, but grew up in the Limpopo province, attending primary school in Marble Hall and high school in nearby Groblersdal, earning several call-ups to represent Limpopo at youth rugby union tournaments. He played at the 2007 Under-13 Craven Week in Krugersdorp, kicking fourteen points in four appearances to finish as Limpopo's third top scorer in the tournament.

In 2010, he made two appearances for Limpopo at the Under-16 Grant Khomo Week in Upington, and in 2011, he played at the premier rugby union tournament for high schools in South Africa, the Under-18 Craven Week. He started all three of their matches at the event held in Kimberley, Northern Cape, scoring 51 points, the second-highest by any player in the competition. After kicking 10 points in their opening match against the Griffons, he scored 26 points in their second match, scoring a try and kicking one penalty and nine conversions in an 81–7 victory over Zimbabwe, a contributed 14 points in their 29–34 defeat to Griquas, getting a try and kicking one penalty and three conversions.

He moved to Pretoria to enroll at Hoërskool Waterkloof for 2012, but didn't get any further representative colours at high school level.

=== 2013–2016: Blue Bulls ===
After high school, Marais joined the academy of the Pretoria-based Blue Bulls. Prior to playing any matches for their youth teams in national competitions, he made two appearances for the senior side in the 2013 Vodacom Cup; he made his first class debut in a 26–33 defeat to a Leopards XV on 6 April 2013, and made a second appearance against the Falcons a week later. In the second half of the season, he reverted to their youth sides, appearing at both Under-19 and Under-21 level. He started off playing in the Under-19 Provincial Championship, but was soon playing in the Under-21 competition, and eventually made six appearances during the round-robin stages of each level. The Under-19 team finished top of the log with 12 wins out of 12 to qualify for the play-offs, and Marais kicked 17 points to help his side to a 37–21 victory over Leopards U19 in the semi-final. He followed that up by a 15-point haul in the final to help his side to a 35–23 victory to be crowned champions. Marais' total contribution of 126 points ensured he was the top scorer in Group A of the competition, despite missing several matches due to playing at Under-21 level. He also scored 78 points at Under-21 level, to also top-score for his team in the Under-21 competition and finishing fourth on the overall Group A points scoring charts.

In 2014, he returned to play for the Under-21 team, and became a key figure for the team, being named in the matchday squad for all 14 of their matches in the Under-21 Provincial Championship. He made seven starts and five appearances as a replacement during the round-robin part of the season, as his team secure another play-off appearance by finishing the regular season in second place. Marais was an unused replacement in his side's 23–19 victory over Golden Lions U21 in their semi-final clash, but got game time in the final, coming on as a replacement just after half-time to help his side to a 20–10 victory over Western Province U21. In addition to winning a title for a second consecutive season, Marais' total points contribution of 138 ensured he finished the competition as the overall top scorer, a single point ahead of Western Province U21s' Robert du Preez. This included scoring 28 points in a 53–25 victory over Sharks U21.

Marais was once again involved in first class action at the start of 2015, making nine appearances for the Blue Bulls in the Vodacom Cup competition. After making two appearances as a replacement in 2013, Marais made his first start in senior rugby in their opening match against the Falcons, kicking 12 points in a 37–13 victory. He played in all seven of their matches during the round-robin stage of the competition, scoring tries against Namibian side the Welwitschias and former side the Limpopo Blue Bulls en route to finishing in second place on the Northern Section log to qualify for the play-offs. He played off the bench in their 44–21 victory over a Free State XV in the quarter-finals, before starting their semi-final against Western Province. Marais scored his side's only point in a low-scoring affair, which the team from Cape Town won 10–6 to eliminate the Blue Bulls. Marais scored a total of 85 points throughout the competition, second only to champions the Pumas' JC Roos. He played at Under-21 level for the third successive season, scoring 67 points in his ten appearances during the Under-21 Provincial Championship. However, his side had a disappointing season, with the defending champions failing to qualify for the semi-finals by finishing the season in fifth spot.

=== 2016: Eastern Province Kings ===
Marais was loaned to the Port Elizabeth-based Eastern Province Kings for the 2016 Currie Cup Premier Division season. He started their opening match in the competition, a 10–28 home defeat to Boland Cavaliers, to make his Currie Cup debut and scoring the Kings' first points of the season, via a 36th-minute penalty. He remained in the starting line-up for their next match against his parent club, the Blue Bulls, kicking all ten points in a 35–49 defeat, before scoring all his side's points in a 6–36 defeat to Western Province in his third consecutive start for his team. However, Pieter-Steyn de Wet established himself as the Kings' first-choice fly-half for the remainder of the competition, and Marais made just one more appearance as a replacement in a 25–57 defeat to the Free State Cheetahs. Marais kicked a conversion in that match to end with a points tally of 21 points, second only to De Wet in EP Kings colours. The Kings endured a poor season, losing all eight of their matches in the competition to finish bottom of the log.

=== 2017–2020: Pumas ===
Marais joined the Nelspruit-based Pumas prior to the 2017 season.

=== 2020-present: Strela ===
In 2020 Marais joined Russian club Strela based in Kazan.
