= Jacques Momberg =

South African rugby union player

- Full name: Christiaan Jacobus Momberg
- Born: 18 February 1991 (age 35) Pretoria, South Africa
- Height: 1.80 m (5 ft 11 in)
- Weight: 105 kg (16 st 7 lb; 231 lb)
- School: Hoërskool Waterkloof
- University: University of Pretoria

Rugby union career
- Position: Hooker
Youth career
- 2004–2011: Blue Bulls
Amateur team(s)
Years	Team	Apps	(Points)
2012	UP Tuks	4	(10)
Senior career
Years	Team	Apps	(Points)
2012	Blue Bulls	2	(0)
2013–2015	Pumas	34	(15)
2015–2022	Rovigo	107	(90)
2023–	Pumas		
- Correct as of 13 March 2023

Christiaan Jacobus 'Jacques' Momberg (born 18 February 1991) is a South African rugby union player, currently playing as a hooker for Italian Top12 side Rovigo., with which he won the National Championship in 2016 and the Italian Cup in 2020. He previously played for the Pumas in the Vodacom Cup and Currie Cup competitions, and for Blue Bulls and UP Tuks.

He was a member of the Pumas side that won the Vodacom Cup for the first time in 2015, beating Western Province 24–7 in the final. Momberg made six appearances during the season and also played in the final.
