= Tinus de Beer =

South African rugby union player

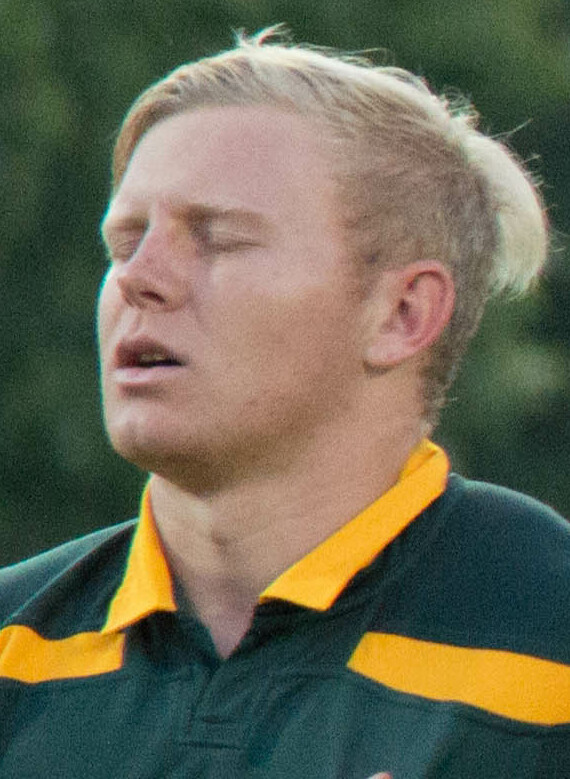
- Full name: Marthinus Herbert de Beer
- Born: 24 January 1996 (age 30) Pretoria, South Africa
- Height: 1.76 m (5 ft 9 1/2 in)
- Weight: 87 kg (13 st 10 lb; 192 lb)
- School: Hoërskool Waterkloof, Pretoria
- University: University of Pretoria

Rugby union career
- Position: Fly-half / Fullback
- Current team: Dragons
Youth career
- 2013–2016: Blue Bulls
Amateur team(s)
| Years | Team | Apps | (Points) |
| 2016–2017 | UP Tuks | 4 | (14) |
Senior career
| Years | Team | Apps | (Points) |
| 2015–2018 | Blue Bulls | 7 | (22) |
| 2016–2018 | Blue Bulls XV | 10 | (50) |
| 2019–2021 | Griquas | 21 | (84) |
| 2022–2023 | Pumas | 27 | (188) |
| 2023–2025 | Cardiff | 27 | (163) |
| 2025– | Dragons | 24 | (46) |
- Correct as of 28 December 2024
International career
| Years | Team | Apps | (Points) |
| 2014 | South Africa Schools | 2 | (20) |
| 2015 | South Africa Under-20 | 4 | (6) |
- Correct as of 14 April 2018

Marthinus Herbert de Beer (born 24 January 1996 in Pretoria, South Africa) is a South African rugby union player who plays for the Dragons in the United Rugby Championship as a fly-half. He previously played for the Blue Bulls, Griquas, Pumas, And Cardiff.

== Career ==
His first provincial representation came in 2013 when he represented the Pretoria-based Blue Bulls at the Under-18 Academy Week competition. He was the second-highest points scorer at the tournament behind André Swarts of the Free State, scoring 39 points in his three appearances.

In July 2014, he represented the Blue Bulls at the premier high school rugby union competition in South Africa, the Under-18 Craven Week held in Middelburg. He scored two tries in their match against KwaZulu-Natal and a further 37 points with the boot to finish the tournament with a personal tally of 47 points, again finishing in second spot on the points-scoring list, this time behind the Leopards' Markus Coetzer. After the Craven Week tournament, he was also selected in the 2014 South African Schools squad that played matches against their counterparts from France, Wales and England in August. He was an unused replacement in their 28–13 win in their first match against France, but started their next match against Wales and had an eventful match, kicking half of South Africa's points in a 40–15 victory through four conversions and four penalties before spending ten minutes in the sin bin later in the match. He started their final match against England, but could not prevent South Africa losing the match 22–30. He returned to domestic action to start two matches for the Blue Bulls U19s in the fullback position during the 2014 Under-19 Provincial Championship, scoring a try in their match against the Free State U19s.

De Beer made his first class debut for the Blue Bulls during the 2015 Vodacom Cup competition. He came on as a replacement for Kobus Marais in the second half of their match against Namibian side Welwitschias in Windhoek and also got his first senior points in the same match, kicking a 71st-minute conversion in a 44–0 victory for the Blue Bulls. He started his first match the following week, kicking seven points in the Blue Bulls' 40–21 win over the Griffons in Pretoria.

Despite initially not being named in a 37-man South Africa Under-20 training squad or playing for them in warm-up matches against a Varsity Cup Dream Team or two matches during a tour to Argentina, he was named in the final squad for the 2015 World Rugby Under 20 Championship. He came on as a replacement in all three of their matches in Pool B of the competition; a 33–5 win against hosts Italy, a 40–8 win against Samoa and a 46–13 win over Australia. De Beer kicked one conversion in each of the three matches during the pool stage to help South Africa finish top of Pool B to qualify for the semi-finals with the best record pool stage of all the teams in the competition. He was an unused replacement in their semi-final match against England, which saw South Africa lose 20–28 to be eliminated from the competition by England for the second year in succession. He again came on as a replacement in their third-place play-off match against France, helping South Africa to a 31–18 win to win the bronze medal.

De Beer captained the Blue Bulls U19s during the 2015 Under-21 Provincial Championship Group A.

On 28 July 2023, Tinus would move to Wales to join capital region Cardiff in the URC competition ahead of the 2023-24 season. On 2 May 2025, Tinus would sign for Welsh rivals Dragons from the 2025-26 season.
