= Marnus Schoeman =

South African rugby union footballer

- Born: 9 February 1989 (age 37) Edenvale, South Africa
- Height: 1.78 m (5 ft 10 in)
- Weight: 96 kg (15 st 2 lb; 212 lb)
- School: Hoërskool Waterkloof
- University: University of Pretoria

Rugby union career
- Position: Blindside Flanker
- Current team: Grenoble
Amateur team(s)
Years	Team	Apps	(Points)
2009	UP Tuks	1	(0)
Senior career
Years	Team	Apps	(Points)
2009–2011	Blue Bulls	12	(15)
2011–2014	Griquas	65	(210)
2015–2018	Pumas	35	(95)
2017	Bulls	1	(0)
2018–2021	Lions	40	(70)
2019–2021	Golden Lions	10	(10)
2021–	Grenoble	3	(0)
- Correct as of 13 September 2021
International career
Years	Team	Apps	(Points)
2009	South Africa Under-20	5	(0)
- Correct as of 21 May 2018

Marnus Schoeman (born 9 February 1989) is a South African rugby union player for the Lions in Super Rugby and the Golden Lions in the Currie Cup. His regular playing position is openside flanker.

== Rugby career ==
He represents the Pumas in the Currie Cup and Vodacom Cup. Schoeman previously played for Griquas and the Blue Bulls. He has also played for Tuks in the Varsity Cup.

After four seasons with Griquas, Schoeman signed a two-year contract with Nelspruit-based side the Pumas from the 2015 season. He was a member of the Pumas side that won the Vodacom Cup for the first time in 2015, beating Western Province 24–7 in the final. Schoeman made eight appearances during the season, scoring seven tries, which included two in the semi-final win over the Golden Lions and two in the final, to finish the competition as the Pumas' top try scorer.

He joined the Stormers Super Rugby side on loan for the 2017 season.

== International ==
Schoeman represented South Africa U20 at the 2009 IRB Junior World Championship in Japan and made 5 appearances.
