= Arno van Wyk =

South African rugby union player

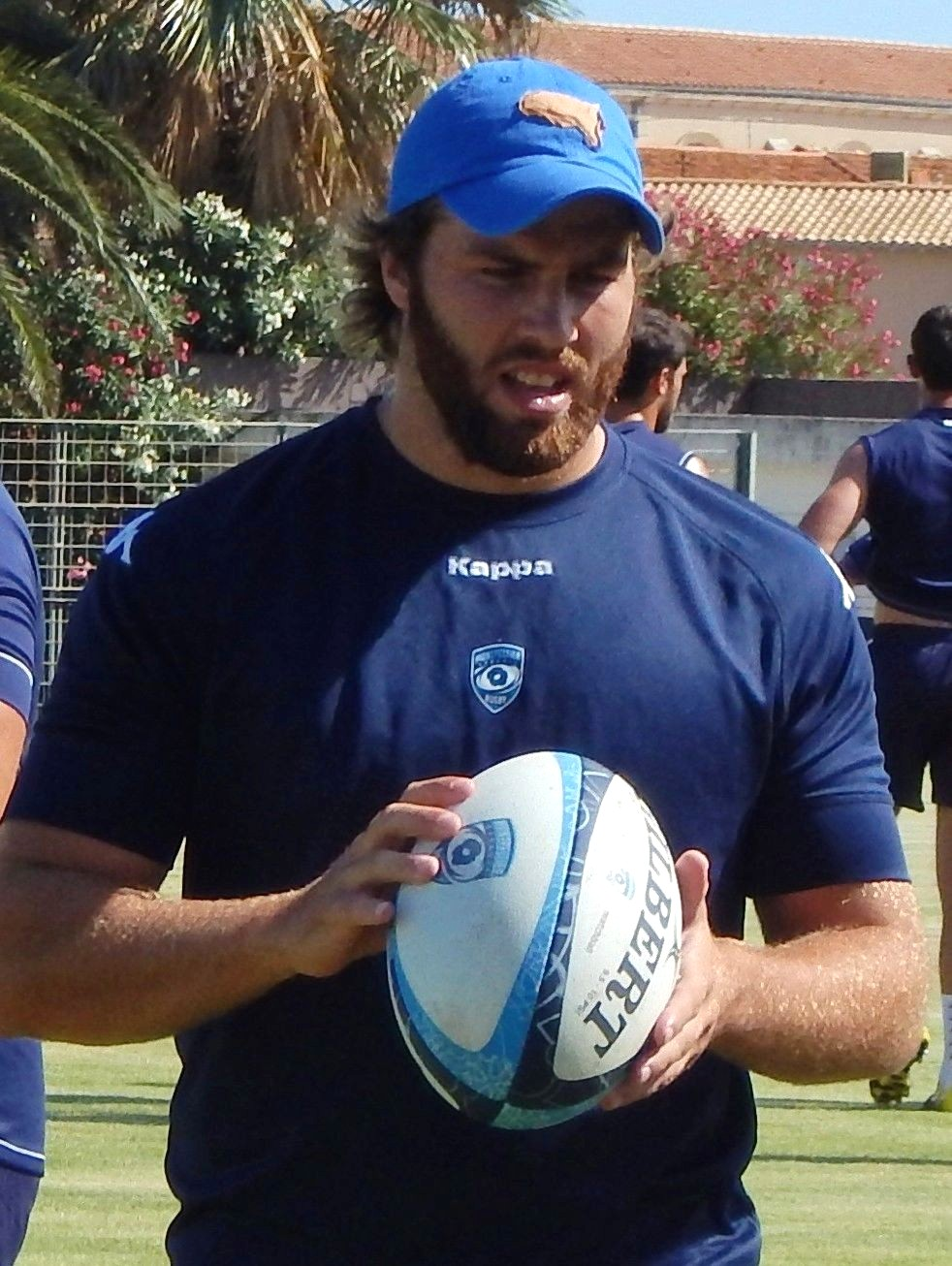
- Born: 19 May 1994 (age 32) Parow, South Africa
- Height: 1.84 m (6 ft 1/2 in)
- Weight: 106 kg (16 st 10 lb; 234 lb)
- School: Hoër Landbouskool Boland (in Afrikaans)
- University: University of Pretoria

Rugby union career
- Position: Hooker
- Current team: Montpellier
Youth career
- 2013–2015: Blue Bulls
- 2016–2017: Montpellier
Amateur team(s)
| Years | Team | Apps | (Points) |
| 2014 | UP Tuks | 3 | (5) |
Senior career
| Years | Team | Apps | (Points) |
| 2014–2015 | Blue Bulls | 11 | (20) |
| 2016–present | Montpellier | 6 | (0) |
- Correct as of 7 January 2017
International career
| Years | Team | Apps | (Points) |
| 2014 | South Africa Under-20 | 0 | (0) |

Arno van Wyk (born 19 May 1994) is a South African professional rugby union player, currently playing with French side Montpellier in the Top 14 competition. He usually plays as a hooker.

== Rugby career ==
=== Blue Bulls ===
Van Wyk was born in Parow, but was never selected to represent Western Province at school level. He moved to Pretoria after school to join the Blue Bulls academy prior to the 2013 season and made thirteen appearances for a Blue Bulls U19 side that won the 2013 Under-19 Provincial Championship, scoring tries in matches against the Leopards and Border.

He made three appearances for UP Tuks in the 2014 Varsity Cup, scoring a try in his side's 26–16 victory over UCT Ikey Tigers. He made his first class debut on 25 April 2014, coming on as a replacement for the final half an hour of their match against the Limpopo Blue Bulls and scoring a try in his side's 116–0 victory. He made one more appearance as a replacement in the competition and was then called up to the South Africa Under-20 team. He was not initially named in the team, but replaced Malcolm Marx in the squad after he picked up an injury after their first match of the competition. Despite his call-up, Van Wyk failed to make an appearance in the competition. He returned to domestic action to make seven appearances for the Blue Bulls U21s in the 2014 Under-21 Provincial Championship, including in the final which was won by the Blue Bulls after beating Western Province 20–10 in Cape Town.

Van Wyk made nine appearances for the Blue Bulls in the 2015 Vodacom Cup, starting eight of those. He scored tries in matches against the Falcons, Leopards XV and Griffons on the Blue Bulls' journey to the semi-final, where they lost 6–10 to Western Province. A further nine appearances followed in the Under-21 team's Provincial Championship campaign, where he scored one try in their match against the Leopards.

=== Montpellier ===
At the start of 2016, Van Wyk moved to France to join Top 14 side Montpellier. He joined as a medical joker for the injured Charles Geli, also signing a youth contract with the team. He made his debut for the senior team in their Round 23 match against La Rochelle, replacing Mickaël Ivaldi for the second half of the match, and was named in the senior squad for the 2016–17 season.
