= Ashlon Davids =

South African rugby union player (born 1993)

- Born: 24 June 1993 (age 33) Malmesbury, South Africa
- Height: 1.70 m (5 ft 7 in)
- Weight: 85 kg (13 st 5 lb; 187 lb)
- School: Schoonspruit Hoërskool, Malmesbury

Rugby union career
- Position: Scrum-half / Fly-half / Fullback
- Current team: Griquas
Youth career
- 2009–2011: Boland Cavaliers
- 2012–2014: Golden Lions
Amateur team(s)
Years	Team	Apps	(Points)
2014	Wits	7	(13)
Senior career
Years	Team	Apps	(Points)
2013–2018	Golden Lions XV	31	(102)
2015	→ Leopards	3	(5)
2015–2018	Golden Lions	12	(11)
2016–2018	Lions	3	(0)
2019	Pumas	12	(8)
2020–	Griquas	21	(14)
- Correct as of 10 July 2022

Ashlon Davids (born 24 June 1993) is a South African professional rugby union player for the Pumas in the Currie Cup and the Rugby Challenge. His regular position is fly-half or fullback.

== Career ==
=== Youth / Boland ===
Davids earned a number of call-ups to represent his home provincial union Boland at youth tournaments at high school level – he played for them at the 2009 Under-16 Grant Khomo Week tournament and at the Under-18 Craven Week tournaments in both 2010 and 2011, scoring one try in each of the latter two tournaments. He was also included in the Boland U19 team that played in Division B of the 2011 Under-19 Provincial Championship, kicking five points in three appearances.

=== Golden Lions ===
After high school, Davids moved to Johannesburg, where he linked up with the Golden Lions. He was the first choice fly-half for their Under-19 side in the 2012 Under-19 Provincial Championship, starting ten of their twelve matches during the regular season and playing off the bench in the other two matches. He also contributed a total of three tries, scored in matches against Leopards U19, Free State U19 and SWD U19. The Golden Lions finished in fourth position on the log to qualify for the semi-finals and Davids started in the semi-final, where a 14–24 defeat to Western Province U19 eliminated them from the competition.

In 2013, he was included in the Golden Lions' squad for the 2013 Vodacom Cup competition and he started two matches in the competition; he marked his first class debut against the Falcons by scoring a try in a 22–27 defeat and then scored two tries and kicked three conversions in their next match, a 26–54 defeat to trans-Jukskei rivals the Blue Bulls. He made seven appearances for the Golden Lions U21 side in the 2013 Under-21 Provincial Championship – all of those as a replacement – and scored one try in their match against Free State U21 in a 23–25 defeat as his side finished in fourth spot. He appeared off the bench in their semi-final match, but was on the losing side as Western Province U21 won the match 44–41 after extra time.

Davids started the 2014 season representing university side Wits in the 2014 Varsity Cup competition. He started all seven of their matches in a disappointing campaign as they failed to win a single match and were relegated to the 2015 Varsity Shield. He was Wits' joint-highest try scorer and second-highest points scorer, contributing 13 points during the competition. Starting eleven of the Golden Lions U21s' matches in the 2014 Under-21 Provincial Championship and coming on as a replacement in the other two, Davids also contributed three tries during the campaign – against Border U21 in a 113–3 win, Gauteng rivals Blue Bulls U21 and the Leopards U21 side – to help the Golden Lions finish in third spot. However, for the third year in a row, Davids tasted defeat at this stage of the season as they lost 19–23 to a Blue Bulls side that won the title a week later.

After playing no first class rugby in 2015, Davids was again included in the Golden Lions' squad for the 2015 Vodacom Cup. He started six of their matches during the regular season; he was the main kicker for the team against the Welwitschias, the Blue Bulls, the Falcons and the Pumas and kicked 40 points in those matches. He scored a try in the match against the Pumas, as well as against the Leopards and the Griffons after Jaco van der Walt took over the kicking duties. The Golden Lions finished the regular season with seven wins out of seven to qualify for the quarter-finals. Davids started their 29–21 victory over the SWD Eagles in the semi-final and their 20–43 defeat to the Pumas as they got knocked out of the competition.

In July 2015, Davids joined Potchefstroom-based side Leopards during their 2015 Currie Cup qualification campaign. He started in their matches against the Griffons, the Boland Cavaliers (which saw him score an early try in a 61–17 victory) and the Border Bulldogs, but could not help them overtake Griquas on the log as the latter qualified to the 2015 Currie Cup Premier Division. However, Davids soon appeared in that competition anyway, as he returned to the Golden Lions and appeared as a late replacement in their 31–16 victory over the Sharks in Round Three of the competition.
