= JC Roos =

South African rugby union player

- Full name: Juan-Claude Roos
- Born: 12 September 1990 (age 36) Witbank, South Africa
- Height: 1.83 m (6 ft 0 in)
- Weight: 94 kg (14 st 11 lb; 207 lb)
- School: Hoërskool Waterkloof, Pretoria

Rugby union career
- Position: Fly-half / Fullback
Amateur team(s)
Years	Team	Apps	(Points)
2009–2011	UP Tuks	6	(68)
Senior career
Years	Team	Apps	(Points)
2009–2011	Blue Bulls	1	(3)
2011–2015	Pumas	62	(672)
2013	→ Falcons	1	(5)
2016–2018	Canon Eagles	19	(171)
2018	Southern Kings	1	(0)
- Correct as of 6 May 2018
International career
Years	Team	Apps	(Points)
2012	South African Barbarians (North)	1	(11)
- Correct as of 31 May 2015

Juan-Claude Roos (born 12 September 1990) is a former South African rugby union player that usually played as a fly-half. He last played for the Southern Kings in the Pro14, having previously played for the Blue Bulls and the Pumas and the Canon Eagles in the Japanese Top League.

He was a member of the Pumas side that won the Vodacom Cup for the first time in 2015, beating Western Province 24–7 in the final. Roos appeared in all ten matches and contributed 118 points, finishing the tournament as the top scorer.

He joined the Port Elizabeth-based Eastern Province Kings for the 2016 season, but after financial problems at the Kings, he made the move to Japan to join the Canon Eagles in January 2016.

He retired in 2018 to concentrate on his online personal training company, Activate Me.
