= Roelof Smit (rugby union) =

South African rugby union player (born 1993)

- Full name: Roelof Andries Smit
- Born: 11 January 1993 (age 33) Queenstown, South Africa
- Height: 1.90 m (6 ft 3 in)
- Weight: 109 kg (17 st 2 lb; 240 lb)
- School: Hoërskool Waterkloof, Pretoria

Rugby union career
- Position: Flanker
- Current team: Cheetahs / Free State Cheetahs
Youth career
- 2009–2010: Border Bulldogs
- 2011–2014: Blue Bulls
Amateur team(s)
Years	Team	Apps	(Points)
2014	UP Tuks	5	(5)
Senior career
Years	Team	Apps	(Points)
2013–2019	Blue Bulls	29	(45)
2014–2019	Bulls	26	(15)
2016–2019	Blue Bulls XV	11	(35)
2020–2021	Lions	0	(0)
2020–2021	Golden Lions	4	(0)
2022	Western Province	3	(5)
2022–	Cheetahs		
2023–	Free State Cheetahs		
- Correct as of 23 July 2022
International career
Years	Team	Apps	(Points)
2013	South Africa Under-20	4	(0)
2016	Springbok XV	1	(5)
- Correct as of 11 April 2018

Roelof Andries Smit (born 11 January 1993 in Queenstown, Eastern Cape) is a South African rugby union player for the Lions in Super Rugby, the Golden Lions in the Currie Cup and the Lions in the Rugby Challenge. He also represented South Africa against the Barbarians in 2016. His regular position is flanker.

== Career ==
=== Youth ===
He represented the Border Bulldogs at the 2009 Under-16 Grant Khomo Week and at the 2010 Under-18 Craven Week. He then joined Pretoria-based team the Blue Bulls and represented them in the Craven Week competition in 2011. In 2012, he was a member of the Blue Bulls teams that finished runners-up in the 2012 Under-19 Provincial Championship, making ten starts and scoring three tries.

=== Blue Bulls ===
He made his senior debut for the Blue Bulls during the 2013 Vodacom Cup, when he came on as a substitute against the Pumas. A further two appearances followed that season.

In 2013, he signed a contract extension to keep him at the Blue Bulls until 2015. He signed a further extension in 2015 to remain in Pretoria until the end of the 2017 season.

=== Representative rugby ===
He was included in the South Africa Under-20 squad for the 2013 IRB Junior World Championship.
