= Martin Sithole =

South African rugby union player (born 1984)

- Full name: Simphiwe Martin Sithole
- Born: 3 February 1984 (age 42) Pietermaritzburg, South Africa
- Height: 1.81 m (5 ft 11 1/2 in)
- Weight: 95 kg (14 st 13 lb; 209 lb)
- School: Kusasalethu SS
- University: Vuselela College

Rugby union career
- Position: Flanker
- Current team: Falcons
Youth career
- 1997–1903: Pumas
- 2004–2005: Leopards
Senior career
Years	Team	Apps	(Points)
2008–2011	Pumas	37	(30)
2011–2016	Griffons	89	(160)
2017–present	Falcons	32	(60)
- Correct as of 25 August 2019
International career
Years	Team	Apps	(Points)
2002	S.A. Schools		
2005	South Africa Under-21	1	(0)
2012	South African Barbarians (North)	1	(0)
- Correct as of 18 June 2013

Simphiwe Martin Sithole (born 3 February 1984 in Pietermaritzburg) is a South African rugby union player for the Falcons in the Currie Cup and the Rugby Challenge. His regular position is flanker.

== Career ==
=== Youth ===
He represented the Pumas at the 1997 Under-13 Craven Week tournament, at Under-17 level in 2002 and at the Under-18 Craven Week in 2001 and 2002. He played in the youth Currie Cup tournaments at Under-19 level in 2002 and Under-20 level in 2003.

In 2004, he joined the Leopards, whom he represented in various youth competitions, as well as being included in the 2005 Vodacom Cup squad, without making an appearance.

=== Pumas ===
In wasn't until 2008 following a return to the Pumas that he made his first class provincial debut. He was included in their squad for the 2008 Vodacom Cup competition and came on as a substitute against the Natal Wildebeest.

He quickly became a regular in the first team, making 37 appearances in both the Vodacom Cup and Currie Cup competitions between 2008 and 2011.

=== Griffons ===
By 2011, he was largely limited to substitute appearances at the Pumas and moved to Welkom to join the Griffons during the 2011 Currie Cup First Division season.

He was a key member of their 2014 Currie Cup First Division-winning side. He played off the bench in the final and helped the Griffons win the match 23–21 to win their first trophy for six years.

=== Representative rugby ===
In 2002, he played for a South African Schools side against France and Wales. Three years later, he represented the South African Under-21s at the 2005 Under 21 Rugby World Championship, playing in one game.

He was also selected for the South African Barbarians (North) team against England that toured South Africa as part of the 2012 mid-year rugby test series.
