= Granville Adams =

American actor (1963–2021)

- Born: October 8, 1963
- Died: October 10, 2021 (aged 58)

Granville Adams (October 8, 1963 – October 10, 2021) was an American actor. He was best known for his role as Zahir Arif on the HBO television series Oz. He also had a recurring role on the NBC series Homicide: Life on the Street as Officer Jeff Westby.

== Arrest ==
On February 4, 2007, Adams was arrested and charged with criminally negligent homicide for the death of a man in a nightclub. According to police reports, Adams got into an altercation with Orlando Valle at BED New York, a Manhattan nightclub of which Adams was a manager. He was accused of pushing Valle against the elevator doors of the sixth floor club, causing the doors to become unhinged and Valle to fall down the shaft to his death. According to Adams' attorneys, Adams was trying to break up an altercation between a patron and an employee when Valle attacked Adams from behind and Adams acted in self-defense by throwing Valle off of his back. Adams was released on $5,000 bail and faced up to four years in prison. On June 30, 2007, a judge dropped the charges against Adams. Valle's family filed a civil suit against Adams.

== Death ==
On October 10, 2021, Adams died of cancer at age 58, two days after his 58th birthday.
