= Percy Williams (rugby union) =

South African rugby union player

- Full name: Kurshwill Williams
- Born: 5 June 1993 (age 33) George, South Africa
- Height: 1.60 m (5 ft 3 in)
- Weight: 70 kg (11 st 0 lb; 154 lb)
- School: Oudtshoorn High School

Rugby union career
- Position: Scrum-half
- Current team: Raiders
Youth career
- 2006–2011: SWD Eagles
- 2012–2013: Golden Lions
Amateur team(s)
Years	Team	Apps	(Points)
2015–2016	NWU Pukke	6	(0)
Senior career
Years	Team	Apps	(Points)
2013	Golden Lions XV	3	(0)
2014–2016	Leopards	7	(0)
2015	Leopards XV	5	(5)
2013–2016	Total	15	(5)
- Correct as of 23 July 2016
International career
Years	Team	Apps	(Points)
2011	South Africa Schools	1	(0)
2013	South Africa Under-20	1	(0)
- Correct as of 19 June 2013

Kurshwill 'Percy' Williams (born 5 June 1993 in George) is a South African rugby union player, that played first class rugby union between 2013 and 2016, playing for the Golden Lions and the Leopards. His regular position is scrum-half.

== Career ==
=== Youth ===
He played for the SWD Eagles at the Under-13 Craven Week tournament in 2006, at the 2009 Under-16 Grant Khomo Week in 2009 and the Under-18 Craven Week in 2011, which also led to his inclusion in the South African Schools squad in the same year. The joined the Johannesburg-based Golden Lions team in 2012 and represented them in the 2012 Under-19 Provincial Championship competition.

=== Golden Lions ===
He made his senior debut for the Golden Lions during the 2013 Vodacom Cup, when he started the match against the Falcons. A further two appearances followed that season.

=== Leopards ===
He joined near-rivals Leopards prior to the 2014 Vodacom Cup season.

He was a member of the Leopards team that won the 2015 Currie Cup First Division. He featured in two matches during the competition and played off the bench in the final, where he helped the Leopards to a 44–20 victory over the SWD Eagles to win the competition for the first time in their history.

=== Representative rugby ===
He was included in a South African Schools side in 2011 and the South Africa Under-20 squad for the 2013 IRB Junior World Championship.
