= Hoërskool Waterkloof =

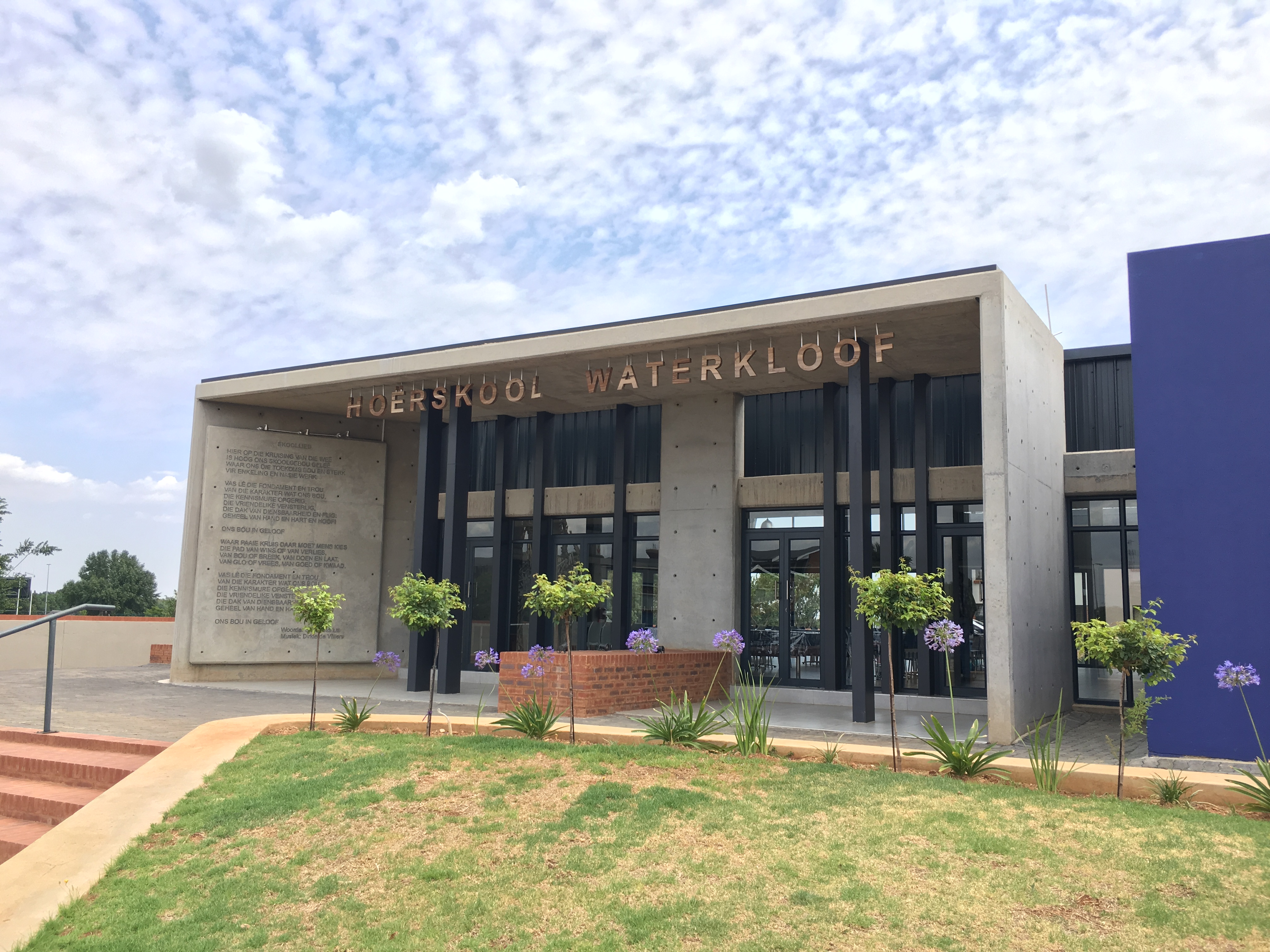
- Hoërskool Waterkloof Hostel entrance

Location
- Boeing St & Solomon Mahlangu Drive, Erasmuskloof; Pretoria, Gauteng; South Africa; 25°49′08″S 28°15′21″E

Information
- School type: Public & boarding
- Motto: Ons bou in Geloof (We build in Faith)
- Religious affiliation: Christianity
- Established: 9 January 1979; 47 years ago
- Headmaster: Mr Juan Nagel
- Grades: 8 to 12
- Gender: Boys & Girls
- Age: 14 to 18
- Enrollment: 2,500 pupils
- Language: Afrikaans
- Schedule: 07:30 – 14:00
- Hours in school day: 6 and a half hours
- Campus type: Suburban
- Colours: Blue; Yellow; White
- Nickname: Klofies
- Rivals: Hoërskool Garsfontein; Die Hoërskool Menlopark; Hoërskool Monument
- Accreditation: Gauteng Department of Education
- Newspaper: KlofieKan
- School fees: R40,000 (boarding); R48,860 (tuition)
- Feeder schools: Laerskool Constantiapark; Laerskool Elarduspark; Laerskool Monumentpark
- Alumni: Old Klofies

Hoërskool Waterkloof (colloquially known as Klofies) is a public Afrikaans medium co-educational high school situated in the eastern suburbs of Pretoria in the Gauteng province of South Africa. It is one of the most expensive Afrikaans medium schools, the fee per child amounting to R 32,400 per annum (as of 2019). It has received the award for academic school of the year from the Gauteng Department of Education (GDE) in 2004, 2008, 2009, 2010, 2011 and 2012. In 2018, it received the award for best academic school in Gauteng province, the ninth time since 2009. It claims a 100% matric pass rate for 30 consecutive years.

== History ==
The school formally opened on 9 January 1979 with 12 classrooms and 441 grade 8 and 9 pupils. The original school buildings were completed on 3 August 1979. By 6 August 1979, the school hall was complete and used for the first time. The first principal was H. Davin, hence the footpath to the administrative building was named "Davinweg". There were 11 suggestions for the school name among which "Hoërskool Hoogland", "Hoërskool Pretoria-Oos" and "Hoërskool op die Kruin". However, on 13 March 1979 it was named as "Hoërskool Waterkloof", and the school motto, "Ons bou in geloof" (i.e. We build in faith), was formally accepted on 2 July.

In 1980, the first permanent principal was appointed, P. van der Merwe Martins, a member of the Afrikaner Broederbond who was previously a teacher in Volksrust. The school employed 12 teachers and 2 typists at this stage, and the first registered student was Riana Hattingh. When Martins received a promotion in 1988, he was replaced by F. van Dyk as the second principal. L. C. Becker was principal from 1991 till 2009, when the school lost control over its finances and the board stepped in. On 12 January 2011, Daan G. C. Potgieter was appointed as the fourth permanent principal. The principal since 1 December 2018 is Chris H. Denysschen, formerly principal of Hoërskool Ben Vorster in Tzaneen.

The school anthem was written by S. J. Pretorius and was accepted on 13 May 1979 and the official banner was handed over on 18 September 1979.

=== 2000s ===
During 2003, local schools received police visits urging pupils to help fight crime. According to the testimony of Christoff Becker, son of Waterkloof's principal, L. Christo Becker, this served as inspiration for two coordinated attacks on loitering black men in Constantia Park and Moreleta Park during the evening of 1 December 2003. Becker and three pupils of the school, the "Waterkloof Four", displayed defiance and arrogance in court and received 12-year prison sentences for assault and murder. A fifth pupil was acquitted for testifying against them. Both Beckers believed that the trial and related incidents constituted a vindictive plot against the family.

In 2007, the school reported alleged incidents of sexual misconduct by its pupils to the police. Older boys would have sexually abused younger boys while on a rugby bus tour.

In 2008, the deputy headmaster Louis Dey (45) sued three of the school's pupils for an amount of R600,000 after an incident in 2006 where they circulated a manipulated picture of him and the principal, L. Christo Becker, which depicted them naked and engaged in a seemingly homosexual act. The three teenagers were ordered to pay R45,000 in damages for sending the image to hundreds of pupils via MMS and Bluetooth, an amount which Dey described as "shockingly inappropriate". Dey resigned his post in 2007 to assume the position of headmaster at another school when Waterkloof's pupils wouldn't stop giggling when they passed him on the school grounds.

In 2009, following a forensic audit requested in December 2008, the governing body committee stepped in to manage the school after uncovering alleged financial irregularities spanning the years 2004 to 2008, which ran into millions of rand. The school principal, L. Christo Becker, and his deputy, André D. Eloff, resigned before they could be put on compulsory leave. Some irate parents claimed the money was used to bankroll the protracted legal battle to keep the principal's son Christoff out of prison, while the upmarket lifestyle of his deputy was also singled out. Money was allegedly channeled through a secret account to the Aviation Academy, from which Becker took "interest free loans". The governing body chaired by Lukas Coetsee requested an audit of the Aviation Academy and considered legal steps against it, but was informed that it was an independent entity with Becker as director, and consequently not obligated to answer to them. At their hearings both Becker and Eloff implicated the governing body in channeling their "additional salaries" through the Academy. Onno Ubbink, subsequent chairman of the governing body said they were "not in a position to comment" on the department's sacking of Becker, Eloff and Van der Merwe, their financial administrator. A teacher speaking on condition of anonymity alleged that the improprieties could be traced back to 1999 and earlier, and that many highly qualified staff had resigned in response to their employment conditions. The same source alleged that the school's many poor pupils were not lent support, but some parents were indeed sued for outstanding fees, who had to pay legal costs as well. Leon de Beer was assigned the role of acting headmaster, until Daan Potgieter replaced him in 2011.

=== 2010s ===
Early 2017, a married male teacher who was appointed less than a year earlier had to quit the school after his alleged intimate encounter with a grade ten pupil came to light. The incident of 2 February 2017 allegedly occurred in a classroom and was brought to the attention of the governing body by the principal. Its chairman disputed that the act was caught on camera or that it occurred following a "sokkie".

=== 2020s ===
On 11 March 2020 a hacker gained access to the school's Facebook and Instagram accounts and vented anger at conditions at the school, including a supposed drop in pass rate and the behaviour of teachers, pupils and parents. In a press release headmaster Chris H. Denysschen labelled the breach as a cyber crime, but his deputy, Cobus van Dyk, claimed that the school suffered no damage to its reputation.

In February 2021 a spokesperson for the Gauteng Education Department expressed his disappointment with the disregard for social distancing at the school, even after completing COVID-19 operating procedures and regulations training. In March a grade 11 learner neglected to inform the school that they had tested positive for COVID-19, and the school placed 100 learners in isolation at a pavilion for their break times and homework session. At other times these pupils claimed to have moved about freely, but this was denied by the school's office. By April several learners and headmaster Chris H. Denysschen had tested positive for COVID-19. Denysschen recovered after a stint in intensive care.

In October 2024 Denysschen claimed that he was the victim of a futile and absurd but well-orchestrated campaign to cause him personal harm. This was after he was put on paid leave following allegations of intimidation, sexual assault and crimen injuria. Denysschen's legal aid was provided by the SAOU trade union. The prudence of a R45 million construction project was also called into question. When completed, the auditorium is intended to double as a church building for the congregation of a popular gospel singer and pastor.

== Notable alumni ==
List of the final years of Hoërskool Waterkloof are in alphabetical order:

- Daantjie Badenhorst (1985) – quiz show champion, journalist and author
- Danie van Schalkwyk (1994) – professional rugby player
- Wikus van Heerden (1997) – professional rugby player, 2007 Rugby World Cup winner
- Gary Botha (1999) – professional rugby player
- Hennie Jacobs (1999) – actor and singer
- Roelof van der Merwe (2002) professional cricketer
- Willem de Beer (2006) – sprinter
- Corné Fourie (2006) – professional rugby player
- Stefan Watermeyer (2006) – professional rugby player
- Melinda Bam (2007) – Miss South Africa (2012)
- Hardus Viljoen (2007) – professional cricket player
- Pieter Malan (2007) – professional cricket player
- Marnus Schoeman (2007) – professional rugby player
- Francois Brummer (2007) – professional rugby player
- Francois de Klerk (2009) – professional rugby player, 2019 & 2023 Rugby World Cup winner
- Andre Malan (2009) – professional cricket player
- Sean Robinson (2011) – professional rugby player
- Christiaan Bezuidenhout (2012) – professional golfer
- Rohan Janse van Rensburg (2012) – professional rugby player
- Zander Lombard (2013) – professional golfer
- Janneman Malan (2014) – professional cricket player
- Tinus de Beer (2014) – professional rugby player
- Stedman Gans (2015) – professional rugby player
- Jordan Hermann (2019) – professional cricketer
