= 2019–20 Cheetahs season =

Cheetahs
- 2019–20 season
- Head coach: Franco Smith (until 14 October 2019); Hawies Fourie (from 14 October 2019)
- Captain: Tian Meyer
- Stadium: Free State Stadium
- Conference A: 4th
- Record: Played 13, Won 6, Lost 7
- Top try scorer: All: Rhyno Smith (10)
- Top points scorer: All: Ruan Pienaar (73)

In the 2019–20 rugby union season, the Cheetahs participated in the 2019–20 Pro14 competition, their third appearance since joining the competition in 2017–18. They remained in Conference A of the competition, which in 2019–20 featured Irish sides Leinster and Ulster, Italian side Zebre, Scottish side Glasgow Warriors and Welsh sides Dragons and Ospreys.

== Personnel ==
=== Coaches and management ===
The Cheetahs coaching and management staff for the 2019–20 Pro14 season are:

2019–20 Cheetahs coaches and management
Position	Name
Head coach	Franco Smith (until 14 October 2019)
Head coach	Hawies Fourie (from 14 October 2019)
Lineout coach	Corniel van Zyl
Defence coach	Charl Strydom
Assistant coach	Melusi Mthethwa
Skills and kicking coach	Albert Keuris
Conditioning coach	Quintin Kruger
Team manager	Ashwell Rafferty
Performance analyst	Renaldo Meyer

=== Squad ===
The Cheetahs squad for the 2019–20 Pro14 is:

2019–20 Cheetahs squad
Player	Position/s	Date of birth (age)	Pro14		Cheetahs	
Player	Position/s	Date of birth (age)	Apps	Pts	Apps	Pts
(South Africa) Wilmar Arnoldi	Hooker	21 October 1994 (aged 24)	–	–	–	–
(South Africa) Dian Badenhorst	Scrum-half	8 August 1996 (aged 23)	–	–	–	–
(South Africa) Craig Barry	Wing	30 April 1992 (aged 27)	9	20	9	20
(South Africa) Justin Basson	Lock	10 February 1994 (aged 25)	25	0	25	0
(South Africa) Clayton Blommetjies	Fullback	30 August 1990 (aged 29)	21	35	15	30
(South Africa) Adriaan Carelse	Fullback	8 February 1995 (aged 24)	–	–	–	–
(Namibia) Aranos Coetzee	Prop	14 March 1988 (aged 31)	43	0	43	0
(South Africa) Carel-Jan Coetzee	Centre / wing	23 January 1995 (aged 24)	1	0	1	0
(South Africa) Aidon Davis	Loose forward	29 April 1994 (aged 25)	4	0	4	0
(South Africa) Luan de Bruin	Prop	13 February 1993 (aged 26)	13	5	13	5
(United States) Ruben de Haas	Scrum-half	9 October 1998 (aged 20)	–	–	–	–
(South Africa) Erich de Jager	Prop	29 February 1996 (aged 23)	8	0	8	0
(South Africa) JP du Preez	Lock	9 November 1994 (aged 24)	20	0	20	0
(South Africa) Joseph Dweba	Hooker	25 October 1995 (aged 23)	19	30	19	30
(South Africa) Louis Fouché	Fly-half / fullback	4 January 1990 (aged 29)	14	27	14	27
(South Africa) Neethling Fouché	Prop	10 January 1993 (aged 26)	–	–	–	–
(South Africa) Malcolm Jaer	Fullback	29 June 1995 (aged 24)	18	35	18	35
(South Africa) Benhard Janse van Rensburg	Centre	14 January 1997 (aged 22)	25	39	20	35
(South Africa) Günther Janse van Vuuren	Prop	24 August 1995 (aged 24)	1	0	1	0
(South Africa) Sias Koen	Flank	1 January 1994 (aged 25)	–	–	–	–
(South Africa) Rewan Kruger	Scrum-half	15 July 1997 (aged 22)	–	–	–	–
(South Africa) Daniel Maartens	Flank	4 May 1995 (aged 24)	10	15	10	15
(Zimbabwe) Tapiwa Mafura	Fullback	11 April 1996 (aged 23)	–	–	–	–
(South Africa) Sintu Manjezi	Lock	7 April 1995 (aged 24)	14	5	14	5
(South Africa) Charles Marais	Prop	29 August 1988 (aged 31)	39	0	39	0
(South Africa) Chris Massyn	Flank	3 June 1994 (aged 25)	–	–	–	–
(South Africa) Rabz Maxwane	Wing	14 August 1995 (aged 24)	28	95	28	95
(South Africa) Tian Meyer	Scrum-half	20 September 1988 (aged 31)	32	15	32	15
(South Africa) Oupa Mohojé	Flank	3 August 1990 (aged 29)	17	10	17	10
(South Africa) Khwezi Mona	Prop	8 October 1992 (aged 26)	–	–	–	–
(South Africa) Ox Nché	Prop	23 July 1995 (aged 24)	38	25	38	25
(South Africa) Abongile Nonkontwana	Flank	10 April 1995 (aged 24)	16	10	16	10
(South Africa) Gerhard Olivier	Flank	17 February 1993 (aged 26)	19	10	19	10
(South Africa) Ruan Pienaar	Scrum-half	10 March 1984 (aged 35)	100	659	–	–
(South Africa) Junior Pokomela	Flank	10 December 1996 (aged 22)	27	20	27	20
(South Africa) Duncan Saal	Wing	24 October 1996 (aged 22)	–	–	–	–
(South Africa) Tian Schoeman	Fly-half	23 September 1991 (aged 28)	21	134	21	134
(South Africa) William Small-Smith	Wing / centre	31 March 1992 (aged 27)	34	51	34	51
(South Africa) Chris Smit	Centre	1 August 1995 (aged 24)	–	–	–	–
(South Africa) Rhyno Smith	Outside back	11 February 1993 (aged 26)	4	5	4	5
(South Africa) Walt Steenkamp	Lock	21 July 1995 (aged 24)	20	10	20	10
(South Africa) Dries Swanepoel	Centre	19 February 1993 (aged 26)	8	5	8	5
(South Africa) Marnus van der Merwe	Hooker	17 February 1997 (aged 22)	9	0	9	0
(South Africa) Boan Venter	Prop	12 April 1997 (aged 22)	1	5	1	5
(South Africa) Henco Venter	Flank	27 March 1992 (aged 27)	24	10	24	10
(South Africa) Reinach Venter	Hooker	3 January 1995 (aged 24)	12	15	12	15
(South Africa) Anthony Volmink	Fullback / wing	10 February 1990 (aged 29)	6	5	–	–
(South Africa) George Whitehead	Fly-half	17 March 1989 (aged 30)	–	–	–	–
(South Africa) Jasper Wiese	Eighth man	21 October 1995 (aged 23)	10	5	10	5
Note: Players' ages and statistics are correct as of 28 September 2019, the date of the opening round of the competition. Pro14 appearances only.

=== Player movements ===
Player movements between the 2018–19 Pro14 season and the end 2019–20 Pro14 season are as follows:

Cheetahs transfers 2018–19 — 2019–20
Pos	2018–19 squad	Out	In	2019–20 squad
PR	Aranos Coetzee; Luan de Bruin; Erich de Jager; Günther Janse van Vuuren; Johan Kotze; Charles Marais; Ox Nché; Boan Venter; Quintin Vorster	(substituted off) Johan Kotze (released); (substituted off) Quintin Vorster (to Griffons)	(substituted in) Neethling Fouché (on loan from Western Province); (substituted in) Khwezi Mona (on loan from Griquas)	Aranos Coetzee; Luan de Bruin; Erich de Jager; Neethling Fouché (on loan); Günther Janse van Vuuren; Charles Marais; Khwezi Mona (on loan); Ox Nché; Boan Venter
HK	Jacques du Toit; Joseph Dweba; Elandré Huggett; Jannes Snyman; Marnus van der Merwe; Reinach Venter	(substituted off) Jacques du Toit (to Southern Kings); (substituted off) Elandré Huggett (released); (substituted off) Jannes Snyman (to Falcons)	(substituted in) Wilmar Arnoldi (from Griquas)	Wilmar Arnoldi; Joseph Dweba; Marnus van der Merwe; Reinach Venter
LK	Justin Basson; Louis Conradie; JP du Preez; Sintu Manjezi; Sibabalo Qoma; Walt Steenkamp; Dennis Visser	(substituted off) Louis Conradie (to (Singapore) Asia Pacific Dragons); (substituted off) Sibabalo Qoma (to Griffons); (substituted off) Dennis Visser (released)		Justin Basson; JP du Preez; Sintu Manjezi; Walt Steenkamp
FL	Daniel Maartens; Stephan Malan; Oupa Mohojé; Abongile Nonkontwana; Gerhard Olivier; Luigy van Jaarsveld; Henco Venter; Ntokozo Vidima; Jasper Wiese	(substituted off) Stephan Malan (to (Italy) Lazio); (substituted off) Luigy van Jaarsveld (released); (substituted off) Ntokozo Vidima (to Border Bulldogs)	(substituted in) Sias Koen (on loan from Griquas); (substituted in) Chris Massyn (from Stormers)	Sias Koen (on loan); Daniel Maartens; Chris Massyn; Oupa Mohojé; Abongile Nonkontwana; Gerhard Olivier; Henco Venter; Jasper Wiese
N8	Aidon Davis; Niell Jordaan; Junior Pokomela	(substituted off) Niell Jordaan (to Griquas)		Aidon Davis; Junior Pokomela
SH	Dian Badenhorst; Ruben de Haas; Tian Meyer; Zee Mkhabela; Rudy Paige; Shaun Venter	(substituted off) Zee Mkhabela (to Sharks); (substituted off) Rudy Paige (to (France) Clermont); (substituted off) Shaun Venter (Ospreys)	(substituted in) Rewan Kruger (from Free State U21); (substituted in) Ruan Pienaar (from (France) Montpellier)	Dian Badenhorst; Ruben de Haas; Rewan Kruger; Tian Meyer; Ruan Pienaar
FH	Ryno Eksteen; Louis Fouché; Tian Schoeman; Niell Stannard; Ernst Stapelberg	(substituted off) Ryno Eksteen (released); (substituted off) Niell Stannard (to Griffons); (substituted off) Ernst Stapelberg (released)	(substituted in) George Whitehead (on loan from Griquas)	Louis Fouché; Tian Schoeman; George Whitehead (on loan)
CE	Lloyd Greeff; Benhard Janse van Rensburg; Tertius Kruger; Nico Lee; Ali Mgijima; William Small-Smith; Dries Swanepoel	(substituted off) Lloyd Greeff (released); (substituted off) Tertius Kruger (to Southern Kings); (substituted off) Nico Lee (to (France) Brive); (substituted off) Ali Mgijima (released)	(substituted in) Chris Smit (from Griquas)	Benhard Janse van Rensburg; William Small-Smith; Chris Smit; Dries Swanepoel
WG	Darren Adonis; Carel-Jan Coetzee; Vuyani Maqina; Rabz Maxwane	(substituted off) Darren Adonis (to South Africa Sevens Academy); (substituted off) Vuyani Maqina (released)	(substituted in) Craig Barry (from Stormers); (substituted in) Duncan Saal (from Stormers)	Craig Barry; Carel-Jan Coetzee; Rabz Maxwane; Duncan Saal
FB	Adriaan Carelse; Malcolm Jaer; Tapiwa Mafura; Rhyno Smith (on loan)		(substituted in) Clayton Blommetjies (from Free State Cheetahs); (substituted in) Anthony Volmink (on loan from Griquas)	Clayton Blommetjies; Adriaan Carelse; Malcolm Jaer; Tapiwa Mafura; Rhyno Smith; Anthony Volmink (on loan)
Coach	Franco Smith		(substituted in) Hawies Fourie (from Maties)	Hawies Fourie; Franco Smith

== Standings ==
The final Conference A log standings were:

2019–20 Pro14 Conference A
Pos	Team	P	W	D	L	PF	PA	PD	TF	TA	TB	LB	Pts
1	(Ireland) Leinster	15	15	0	0	531	216	+315	74	28	9	0	69
2	(Ireland) Ulster	15	8	1	6	385	306	+79	50	40	7	3	44 (Note: Ulster deducted 1 point for an administration error regarding Ian Madigan.)
3	(Scotland) Glasgow Warriors	15	8	0	7	364	329	+35	53	42	5	1	38
4	(South Africa) Cheetahs	13	6	0	7	342	280	+62	48	32	5	2	32
5	(Wales) Dragons	15	5	1	9	283	415	–132	32	49	1	1	24
6	(Italy) Zebre	15	3	1	11	230	399	−169	29	56	4	3	21
7	(Wales) Ospreys	15	2	2	11	205	375	−170	21	45	1	4	17

=== Round-by-round ===
The table below shows the Cheetahs' progression throughout the season. For each round, their cumulative points total is shown with the conference position:

Team	R1	R2	R3	R4	R5	R6	R7	R8	R9	R10	R11	R12	R13	R14	R15	R16	R17	R18	R19	R20	R21	QF	SF	Final
Opposition	GLA	ULS	MUN	CON	SCA	CAR	OSP	ZEB	KIN	KIN	LEI	ULS	DRA	LEI	EDI	OSP	GLA	ZEB	DRA	BEN	KIN	—	—	—
Cumulative Points	5	10	15	16	17	17	21	21	26	31	31	31	32	32	32	32	32	32	32	32	32	—	—	—
Position	1st	1st	1st	2nd	3rd	3rd	3rd	4th	3rd	3rd	3rd	4th	4th	4th	4th	4th	4th	4th	4th	4th	4th	—	—	—
Key:	win	draw	loss	bye																				

== Matches ==
The fixtures for the 2019–20 Pro14 were:

27 September 2019	Cheetahs	48–14	Glasgow Warriors	Toyota Stadium, Bloemfontein
18:05	Try: Joseph Dweba (2); Junior Pokomela; Ruan Pienaar; Rhyno Smith (2); Sias Koen; Con: Ruan Pienaar (5); Pen: Ruan Pienaar	Scoreboard	Try: Nick Frisby; Robbie Nairn; Con: Brandon Thomson (2)	Referee: Dan Jones

5 October 2019	Cheetahs	63–26	Ulster	Toyota Stadium, Bloemfontein
17:15	Try: Joseph Dweba; Anthony Volmink (3); Rhyno Smith (2); Reinach Venter; Louis Fouché penalty try Con: Ruan Pienaar (6); Tian Schoeman (2)	Scoreboard	Try: Sam Carter; James Hume; Craig Gilroy; David Shanahan; Con: John Cooney; Bill Johnston (2)	Referee: Ian Davies

11 October 2019	Cheetahs	40–16	Munster	Toyota Stadium, Bloemfontein
17:15	Try: Ox Nché; Joseph Dweba; Junior Pokomela; William Small-Smith; Rhyno Smith; Jasper Wiese; Con: Ruan Pienaar (4); Tian Schoeman	Scoreboard	Try: Dan Goggin; Con: JJ Hanrahan; Pen: Tyler Bleyendaal (3)	Referee: Mike Adamson

26 October 2019	Connacht	24–22	Cheetahs	Galway Sportsgrounds, Galway
18:15	Try: Niyi Adeolokun; Kieran Marmion; Tom Farrell (2); Con: Conor Fitzgerald (2)	Scoreboard	Try: Joseph Dweba; Rhyno Smith; Clayton Blommetjies; Con: Ruan Pienaar (2); Pen: Ruan Pienaar	Referee: Ben Whitehouse

2 November 2019	Scarlets	17–13	Cheetahs	Parc y Scarlets, Llanelli
17:00	Try: Steff Evans; Kieran Hardy; Con: Dan Jones (2); Pen: Dan Jones	Scoreboard	Try: Tian Meyer; Con: Tian Schoeman; Pen: Tian Schoeman; Ruan Pienaar	Referee: Mike Adamson

9 November 2019	Cardiff Blues	30–17	Cheetahs	Cardiff Arms Park, Cardiff
19:15	Try: Aled Summerhill; Josh Turnbull; Con: Jarrod Evans; Pen: Jason Tovey (2); Jarrod Evans (4)	Scoreboard	Try: Rhyno Smith; Clayton Blommetjies; Con: Ruan Pienaar (2); Pen: Ruan Pienaar	Referee: Ben Blain

30 November 2019	Ospreys	13–18	Cheetahs	Liberty Stadium, Swansea
21:35	Try: Maʻafu Fia; Con: Luke Price; Pen: Luke Price (2)	Scoreboard	Try: William Small-Smith; Wilmar Arnoldi; Con: Tian Schoeman; Pen: Ruan Pienaar; Tian Schoeman	Referee: Joy Neville

4 January 2020	Zebre	41–13	Cheetahs	Stadio Sergio Lanfranchi, Parma
18:00	Try: Charlie Walker (2); Johan Meyer; Josh Renton; Giulio Bisegni; Con: Carlo Canna (5); Pen: Carlo Canna (2)	Scoreboard	Try: Wilmar Arnoldi; Tian Meyer; Pen: George Whitehead	Referee: Sam Grove-White

25 January 2020	Southern Kings	30–31	Cheetahs	Nelson Mandela Bay Stadium, Port Elizabeth
	Try: Bader Pretorius; Stefan Ungerer; JT Jackson; Con: Bader Pretorius (3); Pen: Bader Pretorius (3)	Scoreboard	Try: Sintu Manjezi (2); Wilmar Arnoldi; Rhyno Smith (2); Con: Tian Schoeman; Ruan Pienaar (2)	Referee: Stuart Berry

1 February 2020	Cheetahs	45–0	Southern Kings	Toyota Stadium, Bloemfontein
	Try: Joseph Dweba (2); Chris Massyn; Jasper Wiese; Clayton Blommetjies; Rhyno Smith; Louis Fouché; Con: Ruan Pienaar (2); Tian Schoeman; Louis Fouché (2)	Scoreboard		Referee: Divan Uys

15 February 2020	Leinster	36–12	Cheetahs	RDS Arena, Dublin
16:30	Try: Will Connors (2); Michael Bent; Rónan Kelleher; Rhys Ruddock; Con: Ciarán Frawley (4); Pen: Ciarán Frawley	Scoreboard	Try: Luan de Bruin; Aidon Davis; Con: Ruan Pienaar	Referee: Ben Whitehouse

22 February 2020	Ulster	20–10	Cheetahs	Kingspan Stadium, Belfast
21:35	Try: Tom O'Toole; Robert Baloucoune; Con: Bill Johnston (2); Pen: Bill Johnston (2)	Scoreboard	Try: Clayton Blommetjies; Con: Ruan Pienaar; Pen: Ruan Pienaar	Referee: Mike Adamson

29 February 2020	Dragons	13–10	Cheetahs	Rodney Parade, Newport
19:15	Try: Jared Rosser; Con: Sam Davies; Pen: Sam Davies (2)	Scoreboard	Try: Junior Pokomela; Con: Tian Schoeman; Pen: Tian Schoeman	Referee: Andrew Brace

Following round 13 the league was suspended until 22 August due to the COVID-19 pandemic, however due to travel difficulties surrounding the pandemic, the Cheetahs were unable to complete their fixtures.

== Player statistics ==
The Pro14 appearance record for players that represented the Cheetahs in 2019–20 is as follows:

2019–20 Cheetahs player statistics
Player name	GLA	ULS	MUN	CON	SCA	CAR	OSP	ZEB	KIN	KIN	LEI	ULS	DRA	LEI	EDI	OSP	GLA	ZEB	DRA	BEN	KIN	App	Try	Con	Pen	DG	Pts
Ox Nché	1	1	1	1										—	—	—	—	—	—	—	—	4	1	0	0	0	5
Joseph Dweba	2	2	2	2	2	2		16 (substituted in)	2	2	2	16 (substituted in)	16 (substituted in)	—	—	—	—	—	—	—	—	12	7	0	0	0	35
Erich de Jager	3	3			18 (substituted in)	18	18	17 (substituted in)	17 (substituted in)					—	—	—	—	—	—	—	—	5	0	0	0	0	0
Sintu Manjezi	4	4	4	4	4	4	4	4	4			4	4	—	—	—	—	—	—	—	—	11	2	0	0	0	10
Walt Steenkamp	5	5	5	5	19 (substituted in)	5	5	5	5	4	4	5	5	—	—	—	—	—	—	—	—	13	0	0	0	0	0
Gerhard Olivier	6	6	6	6	20 (substituted in)	6	20 (substituted in)	21 (substituted in)	8		20 (substituted in)		6	—	—	—	—	—	—	—	—	11	0	0	0	0	0
Junior Pokomela	7	7	7	7	7	7	7	7	7	7	7	7	7	—	—	—	—	—	—	—	—	13	3	0	0	0	15
Henco Venter	8	8	8											—	—	—	—	—	—	—	—	3	0	0	0	0	0
Ruan Pienaar	9	9	9	9	21 (substituted in)	9	9	22 (substituted in)	21 (substituted in)	9	9	9		—	—	—	—	—	—	—	—	12	1	25	6	0	73
Tian Schoeman	10	10	10	10	10	10	10	23 (substituted in)	10	10	10	10	10	—	—	—	—	—	—	—	—	12	0	8	3	0	25
Anthony Volmink	11	11	11	11	23	11			11					—	—	—	—	—	—	—	—	6	3	0	0	0	15
Dries Swanepoel	12	12		13										—	—	—	—	—	—	—	—	3	0	0	0	0	0
Benhard Janse van Rensburg	13	13	13	12	13	12	12	12	12	12	12	12	12	—	—	—	—	—	—	—	—	13	0	0	0	0	0
William Small-Smith	14	14	14	23 (substituted in)	14	13	13	13	13	13	13	13	13	—	—	—	—	—	—	—	—	13	2	0	0	0	10
Rhyno Smith	15	15	15	15	15	15	15	15	15	15	15	14	14	—	—	—	—	—	—	—	—	13	10	0	0	0	50
Reinach Venter	16 (substituted in)	16 (substituted in)	16 (substituted in)				17 (substituted in)							—	—	—	—	—	—	—	—	4	1	0	0	0	5
Boan Venter	17 (substituted in)	17 (substituted in)	17 (substituted in)	17 (substituted in)	1	17 (substituted in)	1	1	1	17 (substituted in)	17 (substituted in)	1	1	—	—	—	—	—	—	—	—	13	0	0	0	0	0
Luan de Bruin	18 (substituted in)		3	18 (substituted in)	17 (substituted in)	1	3	18 (substituted in)	18 (substituted in)	18 (substituted in)	18 (substituted in)	3	3	—	—	—	—	—	—	—	—	12	1	0	0	0	5
JP du Preez	19 (substituted in)	19 (substituted in)	19 (substituted in)	19 (substituted in)	5	19	19 (substituted in)	19 (substituted in)	19 (substituted in)	5	5	19 (substituted in)	19 (substituted in)	—	—	—	—	—	—	—	—	12	0	0	0	0	0
Sias Koen	20 (substituted in)	20 (substituted in)	20 (substituted in)	20 (substituted in)	6	20 (substituted in)							20 (substituted in)	—	—	—	—	—	—	—	—	7	1	0	0	0	5
Jasper Wiese	21 (substituted in)	21 (substituted in)	21 (substituted in)	8	8	8				8	8	8		—	—	—	—	—	—	—	—	9	2	0	0	0	10
Tian Meyer	22 (substituted in)	22 (substituted in)	22 (substituted in)	21	9	21 (substituted in)	21 (substituted in)	9	9	21 (substituted in)	21 (substituted in)	21 (substituted in)	9	—	—	—	—	—	—	—	—	12	2	0	0	0	10
Louis Fouché	23 (substituted in)	23 (substituted in)	12		12	23 (substituted in)				22 (substituted in)	22 (substituted in)	22 (substituted in)	22 (substituted in)	—	—	—	—	—	—	—	—	9	2	2	0	0	14
Neethling Fouché		18 (substituted in)	18 (substituted in)											—	—	—	—	—	—	—	—	2	0	0	0	0	0
Clayton Blommetjies			23 (substituted in)	14	11	14	11		14	14	14	15	15	—	—	—	—	—	—	—	—	10	4	0	0	0	20
Aranos Coetzee				3	3	3		3	3	3	3	18 (substituted in)	18 (substituted in)	—	—	—	—	—	—	—	—	9	0	0	0	0	0
Wilmar Arnoldi				16 (substituted in)	16 (substituted in)	16 (substituted in)	2	2	16 (substituted in)	16 (substituted in)	16 (substituted in)	2	2	—	—	—	—	—	—	—	—	10	3	0	0	0	15
George Whitehead				22	22 (substituted in)	22 (substituted in)	22	10	22 (substituted in)					—	—	—	—	—	—	—	—	4	0	0	1	0	3
Chris Massyn							6	6	6	6	6	6		—	—	—	—	—	—	—	—	6	1	0	0	0	5
Aidon Davis							8	8	20 (substituted in)	19 (substituted in)	19 (substituted in)	20 (substituted in)	8	—	—	—	—	—	—	—	—	7	1	0	0	0	5
Craig Barry							14	14				11	11	—	—	—	—	—	—	—	—	4	0	0	0	0	0
Marnus van der Merwe							16 (substituted in)	20 (substituted in)						—	—	—	—	—	—	—	—	2	0	0	0	0	0
Chris Smit							23 (substituted in)		23 (substituted in)	23 (substituted in)	23	23 (substituted in)	23 (substituted in)	—	—	—	—	—	—	—	—	5	0	0	0	0	0
Rabz Maxwane								11		11	11		21	—	—	—	—	—	—	—	—	3	0	0	0	0	0
Charles Marais										1	1	17 (substituted in)	17 (substituted in)	—	—	—	—	—	—	—	—	4	0	0	0	0	0
Daniel Maartens										20 (substituted in)				—	—	—	—	—	—	—	—	1	0	0	0	0	0
penalty try																						–	1	–	–	–	7
Total																						13	48	35	10	0	342
(c) denotes the team captain. For each match, the player's squad number is shown. Starting players are numbered 1 to 15, while the replacements are numbered 16 to 23. If a replacement made an appearance in the match, it is indicated by (substituted in) . "App" refers to the number of appearances made by the player, "Try" to the number of tries scored by the player, "Con" to the number of conversions kicked, "Pen" to the number of penalties kicked, "DG" to the number of drop goals kicked and "Pts" refer to the total number of points scored by the player. Dian Badenhorst, Justin Basson, Adriaan Carelse, Carel-Jan Coetzee, Ruben de Haas, Malcolm Jaer, Günther Janse van Vuuren, Rewan Kruger, Tapiwa Mafura, Oupa Mohojé, Khwezi Mona, Abongile Nonkontwana and Duncan Saal were named in the squad for the season, but never included in a matchday squad.

== See also ==
- Cheetahs
- Pro14
