= 2018–19 Cheetahs season =

Cheetahs
- 2018–19 season
- Head coach: Franco Smith
- Captain: Oupa Mohojé
- Stadium: Free State Stadium
- Conference A: 6th
- Record: Won 8, Drew 1, Lost 12
- Top try scorer: All: Rabz Maxwane (14)
- Top points scorer: All: Tian Schoeman (134)

In the 2018–19 rugby union season, the Cheetahs participated in the 2018–19 Pro14 competition, their second appearance since joining the competition in 2017–18. The remained in Conference A of the competition, along with Irish sides Connacht and Munster, Italian side Zebre, Scottish side Glasgow Warriors and Welsh sides Cardiff Blues and Ospreys.

== Personnel ==
=== Coaches and management ===
The Cheetahs coaching and management staff for the 2018–19 Pro14 season are:

2018–19 Cheetahs coaches and management
| Position | Name |
|---|---|
| Head coach | Franco Smith |
| Scrum coach | Daan Human |
| Lineout coach | Corniel van Zyl |
| Defence coach | Charl Strydom |
| Skills and kicking coach | Albert Keuris |
| Conditioning coach | Quintin Kruger |
| Team manager | Ashwell Rafferty |

=== Squad ===
The Cheetahs squad for the 2018–19 Pro14 is:

2018–19 Cheetahs squad
| Player | Position/s | Date of birth (age) | Pro14 | | Cheetahs | |
| Player | Position/s | Date of birth (age) | Apps | Pts | Apps | Pts |
|---|---|---|---|---|---|---|
| (South Africa) Darren Adonis | Outside back | 13 September 1998 (aged 19) | – | – | – | – |
| (South Africa) Dian Badenhorst | Scrum-half | 8 August 1996 (aged 22) | – | – | – | – |
| (South Africa) Justin Basson | Lock | 10 February 1994 (aged 24) | 13 | 0 | 13 | 0 |
| (South Africa) Adriaan Carelse | Fullback | 8 February 1995 (aged 23) | – | – | – | – |
| (Namibia) Aranos Coetzee | Prop | 14 March 1988 (aged 30) | 22 | 0 | 22 | 0 |
| (South Africa) Carel-Jan Coetzee | Centre / wing | 23 January 1995 (aged 23) | – | – | – | – |
| (South Africa) Louis Conradie | Lock | 11 June 1996 (aged 22) | – | – | – | – |
| (South Africa) Aidon Davis | Loose forward | 29 April 1994 (aged 24) | – | – | – | – |
| (South Africa) Luan de Bruin | Prop | 13 February 1993 (aged 25) | 1 | 0 | 1 | 0 |
| (United States) Ruben de Haas | Scrum-half | 9 October 1998 (aged 19) | – | – | – | – |
| (South Africa) Erich de Jager | Prop | 29 February 1996 (aged 22) | 2 | 0 | 2 | 0 |
| (South Africa) JP du Preez | Lock | 9 November 1994 (aged 23) | – | – | – | – |
| (South Africa) Jacques du Toit | Hooker | 19 November 1993 (aged 24) | 18 | 5 | 18 | 5 |
| (South Africa) Joseph Dweba | Hooker | 25 October 1995 (aged 22) | 1 | 0 | 1 | 0 |
| (South Africa) Ryno Eksteen | Fullback | 3 October 1994 (aged 23) | – | – | – | – |
| (South Africa) Louis Fouché | Fly-half / fullback | 4 January 1990 (aged 28) | – | – | – | – |
| (South Africa) Lloyd Greeff | Wing | 3 January 1994 (aged 24) | 15 | 10 | 2 | 0 |
| (South Africa) Elandré Huggett | Hooker | 5 October 1991 (aged 26) | – | – | – | – |
| (South Africa) Malcolm Jaer | Fullback | 29 June 1995 (aged 23) | 3 | 5 | 3 | 5 |
| (South Africa) Benhard Janse van Rensburg | Centre | 14 January 1997 (aged 21) | 5 | 4 | – | – |
| (South Africa) Günther Janse van Vuuren | Prop | 24 August 1995 (aged 23) | – | – | – | – |
| (South Africa) Niell Jordaan | Loose forward | 13 January 1992 (aged 26) | 2 | 0 | 2 | 0 |
| (South Africa) Johan Kotze | Prop | 13 January 1995 (aged 23) | – | – | – | – |
| (South Africa) Tertius Kruger | Centre | 9 August 1993 (aged 25) | 2 | 0 | 2 | 0 |
| (South Africa) Nico Lee | Centre | 13 March 1994 (aged 24) | 14 | 30 | 14 | 30 |
| (South Africa) Daniel Maartens | Flank | 4 May 1995 (aged 23) | 2 | 0 | 2 | 0 |
| (Zimbabwe) Tapiwa Mafura | Fullback | 11 April 1996 (aged 22) | – | – | – | – |
| (South Africa) Stephan Malan | Eighth man | 24 September 1994 (aged 23) | – | – | – | – |
| (South Africa) Sintu Manjezi | Lock | 7 April 1995 (aged 23) | – | – | – | – |
| (South Africa) Charles Marais | Prop | 29 August 1988 (aged 30) | 20 | 0 | 20 | 0 |
| (South Africa) Vuyani Maqina | Wing | 11 January 1994 (aged 24) | – | – | – | – |
| (South Africa) Rabz Maxwane | Wing | 14 August 1995 (aged 23) | 8 | 25 | 8 | 25 |
| (South Africa) Tian Meyer | Scrum-half | 20 September 1988 (aged 29) | 16 | 15 | 16 | 15 |
| (South Africa) Ali Mgijima | Centre | 12 February 1995 (aged 23) | 3 | 0 | 3 | 0 |
| (South Africa) Zee Mkhabela | Scrum-half | 15 October 1994 (aged 23) | 9 | 0 | 9 | 0 |
| (South Africa) Oupa Mohojé | Flank | 3 August 1990 (aged 28) | 16 | 10 | 16 | 10 |
| (South Africa) Ox Nché | Prop | 23 July 1995 (aged 23) | 22 | 15 | 22 | 15 |
| (South Africa) Abongile Nonkontwana | Flank | 10 April 1995 (aged 23) | – | – | – | – |
| (South Africa) Gerhard Olivier | Flank | 17 February 1993 (aged 25) | 1 | 0 | 1 | 0 |
| (South Africa) Rudy Paige | Scrum-half | 2 August 1989 (aged 29) | – | – | – | – |
| (South Africa) Junior Pokomela | Flank | 10 December 1996 (aged 21) | 10 | 5 | 10 | 5 |
| (South Africa) Sibabalo Qoma | Lock | 17 February 1997 (aged 21) | – | – | – | – |
| (South Africa) Tian Schoeman | Fly-half | 23 September 1991 (aged 26) | – | – | – | – |
| (South Africa) William Small-Smith | Wing / centre | 31 March 1992 (aged 26) | 15 | 26 | 15 | 26 |
| (South Africa) Rhyno Smith | Outside back | 11 February 1993 (aged 25) | – | – | – | – |
| (South Africa) Jannes Snyman | Hooker | 18 August 1993 (aged 25) | – | – | – | – |
| (South Africa) Niell Stannard | Fly-half | 16 April 1996 (aged 22) | – | – | – | – |
| (South Africa) Ernst Stapelberg | Fly-half | 6 February 1995 (aged 23) | 6 | 72 | 6 | 72 |
| (South Africa) Walt Steenkamp | Lock | 21 July 1995 (aged 23) | – | – | – | – |
| (South Africa) Dries Swanepoel | Centre | 19 February 1993 (aged 25) | – | – | – | – |
| (South Africa) Marnus van der Merwe | Hooker | 17 February 1997 (aged 21) | – | – | – | – |
| (South Africa) Luigy van Jaarsveld | Eighth man | 21 August 1996 (aged 22) | – | – | – | – |
| (South Africa) Boan Venter | Prop | 12 April 1997 (aged 21) | – | – | – | – |
| (South Africa) Henco Venter | Flank | 27 March 1992 (aged 26) | 17 | 5 | 17 | 5 |
| (South Africa) Reinach Venter | Hooker | 3 January 1995 (aged 23) | – | – | – | – |
| (South Africa) Shaun Venter | Scrum-half | 16 March 1987 (aged 31) | 16 | 15 | 16 | 15 |
| (South Africa) Ntokozo Vidima | Lock | 13 May 1995 (aged 23) | – | – | – | – |
| (South Africa) Dennis Visser | Lock | 20 January 1993 (aged 25) | 1 | 0 | 1 | 0 |
| (South Africa) Quintin Vorster | Prop | 26 August 1995 (aged 23) | – | – | – | – |
| (South Africa) Jasper Wiese | Eighth man | 21 October 1995 (aged 22) | 2 | 0 | 2 | 0 |
Note: Players' ages and statistics are correct as of 1 September 2018, the date of the opening round of the competition. Pro14 appearances only.

=== Player movements ===
Player movements between the 2017–18 Pro14 season and the end 2018–19 Pro14 season are as follows:

Cheetahs transfers 2018–2019
| Pos | 2017–18 squad | Out | In | 2018–19 players |
|---|---|---|---|---|
| PR | Tom Botha; Aranos Coetzee; Luan de Bruin; Erich de Jager; Günther Janse van Vuuren (did not play); Johan Kotze (did not play); Charles Marais; Ox Nché | (substituted off) Tom Botha (to (Wales) Ospreys) | (substituted on) Boan Venter (from Free State XV); (substituted on) Quintin Vorster (from Free State XV) | Aranos Coetzee; Luan de Bruin; Erich de Jager; Günther Janse van Vuuren; Johan Kotze; Charles Marais; Ox Nché; Boan Venter; Quintin Vorster |
| HK | Jacques du Toit; Joseph Dweba; Elandré Huggett (did not play); Torsten van Jaarsveld; Reinach Venter (did not play) | (substituted off) Torsten van Jaarsveld (to (France) Bayonne) | (substituted on) Jannes Snyman (from UJ); (substituted on) Marnus van der Merwe (from Free State Cheetahs) | Jacques du Toit; Joseph Dweba; Elandré Huggett; Jannes Snyman; Marnus van der Merwe; Reinach Venter |
| LK | Justin Basson; Rynier Bernardo; Reniel Hugo; Armandt Koster; Hilton Lobberts (did not play); Dennis Visser; Carl Wegner | (substituted off) Rynier Bernardo (to (Japan) Canon Eagles); (substituted off) Reniel Hugo (to (Japan) Toyota Verblitz); (substituted off) Armandt Koster (to (France) Grenoble); (substituted off) Hilton Lobberts (to Pumas); (substituted off) Carl Wegner (to (Japan) Toyota Verblitz) | (substituted on) Louis Conradie (from Free State XV); (substituted on) JP du Preez (from Free State XV); (substituted on) Sintu Manjezi (from Griquas); (substituted on) Sibabalo Qoma (from Free State Cheetahs); (substituted on) Walt Steenkamp (from Leopards) | Justin Basson; Louis Conradie; JP du Preez; Sintu Manjezi; Sibabalo Qoma; Walt Steenkamp; Dennis Visser |
| FL | Uzair Cassiem; Chris Dry (loan); Daniel Maartens; Oupa Mohojé; Gerhard Olivier; Paul Schoeman; Henco Venter; Ntokozo Vidima (did not play); Jasper Wiese | (substituted off) Uzair Cassiem (to (Wales) Scarlets); (substituted off) Chris Dry (returned to South Africa Sevens); (substituted off) Paul Schoeman (to Blue Bulls); (substituted off) Henco Venter (to (Japan) Toshiba Brave Lupus) | (substituted on) Stephan Malan (from Free State XV); (substituted on) Abongile Nonkontwana (from Blue Bulls); (substituted on) Luigy van Jaarsveld (from Blue Bulls XV) | Daniel Maartens; Stephan Malan; Oupa Mohojé; Abongile Nonkontwana; Gerhard Olivier; Luigy van Jaarsveld; Ntokozo Vidima; Jasper Wiese |
| N8 | Niell Jordaan; Junior Pokomela | | (substituted on) Aidon Davis (from (France) Bayonne) | Aidon Davis; Niell Jordaan; Junior Pokomela |
| SH | Tian Meyer; Zee Mkhabela; JP Smith (did not play); Ruan van Rensburg (did not play); Shaun Venter | (substituted off) JP Smith (to Southern Kings); (substituted off) Ruan van Rensburg (to Southern Kings) | (substituted on) Dian Badenhorst (from Free State Cheetahs); (substituted on) Ruben de Haas (from Free State XV); (substituted on) Rudy Paige (from Bulls) | Dian Badenhorst; Ruben de Haas; Tian Meyer; Zee Mkhabela; Rudy Paige; Shaun Venter |
| FH | Ryno Eksteen (did not play); Johan Goosen; Niel Marais; Robbie Petzer; Ernst Stapelberg; Fred Zeilinga | (substituted off) Johan Goosen (to (France) Montpellier); (substituted off) Niel Marais (to (Japan) Yamaha Júbilo); (substituted off) Robbie Petzer (to SWD Eagles); (substituted off) Fred Zeilinga ( (Japan) Canon Eagles) | (substituted on) Louis Fouché (from (Japan) Kubota Spears); (substituted on) Tian Schoeman (from (France) Bordeaux); (substituted on) Niell Stannard (from UFS Shimlas) | Ryno Eksteen; Louis Fouché; Tian Schoeman; Niell Stannard; Ernst Stapelberg |
| CE | Rayno Benjamin; Lloyd Greeff; Tertius Kruger; Nico Lee; Ali Mgijima; William Small-Smith; Clinton Swart; Francois Venter | (substituted off) Rayno Benjamin (to Boland Cavaliers); (substituted off) Clinton Swart (to (Japan) Toyota Verblitz); (substituted off) Francois Venter ( (England) Worcester Warriors) | (substituted on) Benhard Janse van Rensburg (from Sharks); (substituted on) Dries Swanepoel (from Bulls) | Lloyd Greeff; Benhard Janse van Rensburg; Tertius Kruger; Nico Lee; Ali Mgijima; William Small-Smith; Dries Swanepoel |
| WG | Makazole Mapimpi; Rabz Maxwane; Luther Obi; Sergeal Petersen; Raymond Rhule; Rosko Specman; Lihleli Xoli (did not play) | (substituted off) Makazole Mapimpi (to Sharks); (substituted off) Luther Obi (injured); (substituted off) Sergeal Petersen (to Stormers); (substituted off) Raymond Rhule (to Stormers); (substituted off) Rosko Specman (returned to South Africa Sevens); (substituted off) Lihleli Xoli (not named) | (substituted on) Darren Adonis (from Free State Cheetahs); (substituted on) Carel-Jan Coetzee (from Free State Cheetahs); (substituted on) Vuyani Maqina (from Free State Cheetahs) | Darren Adonis; Carel-Jan Coetzee; Vuyani Maqina; Rabz Maxwane |
| FB | Cecil Afrika (on loan); Craig Barry (on loan); Clayton Blommetjies; AJ Coertzen; Malcolm Jaer | (substituted off) Cecil Afrika (returned to South Africa Sevens); (substituted off) Craig Barry (returned to Stormers); (substituted off) Clayton Blommetjies (to (Wales) Scarlets); (substituted off) AJ Coertzen (to (France) Aurillac) | (substituted on) Adriaan Carelse (from Boland Cavaliers); (substituted on) Tapiwa Mafura (from Leopards); (substituted on) Rhyno Smith (on loan from Sharks) | Adriaan Carelse; Malcolm Jaer; Tapiwa Mafura; Rhyno Smith (on loan) |
| Coach | Rory Duncan | (substituted off) Rory Duncan (to (England) Worcester Warriors) | (substituted on) Franco Smith (from Director of Rugby) | Franco Smith |

== Standings ==
The final Conference A log standings were:

2018–19 Pro14 Conference A
| Pos | Team | P | W | D | L | PF | PA | PD | TF | TA | TB | LB | Pts |
|---|---|---|---|---|---|---|---|---|---|---|---|---|---|
| 1 | (Scotland) Glasgow Warriors | 21 | 16 | 0 | 5 | 621 | 380 | +241 | 83 | 48 | 15 | 2 | 81 |
| 2 | (Ireland) Munster | 21 | 16 | 0 | 5 | 612 | 348 | +264 | 82 | 44 | 11 | 2 | 77 |
| 3 | (Ireland) Connacht | 21 | 12 | 0 | 9 | 475 | 394 | +81 | 60 | 55 | 7 | 6 | 61 |
| 4 | (Wales) Ospreys | 21 | 12 | 0 | 9 | 445 | 404 | +41 | 53 | 47 | 6 | 4 | 58 |
| 5 | (Wales) Cardiff Blues | 21 | 10 | 0 | 11 | 497 | 451 | +46 | 60 | 58 | 7 | 7 | 54 |
| 6 | (South Africa) Cheetahs | 21 | 8 | 1 | 12 | 541 | 606 | −65 | 80 | 80 | 9 | 3 | 46 |
| 7 | (Italy) Zebre | 21 | 3 | 0 | 18 | 260 | 640 | −380 | 35 | 86 | 5 | 2 | 19 |

=== Round-by-round ===
The table below shows the Cheetahs' progression throughout the season. For each round, their cumulative points total is shown with the conference position:

| Team | R1 | R2 | R3 | R4 | R5 | R6 | R7 | R8 | R9 | R10 | R11 | R12 | R13 | R14 | R15 | R16 | R17 | R18 | R19 | R20 | R21 | QF | SF | Final |
|---|---|---|---|---|---|---|---|---|---|---|---|---|---|---|---|---|---|---|---|---|---|---|---|---|
| Opposition | MUN | OSP | GLA | ULS | CAR | EDI | CAR | MUN | BEN | CON | ZEB | KIN | ZEB | KIN | CON | SCA | LEI | GLA | OSP | DRA | KIN | —N/a | —N/a | —N/a |
| Cumulative Points | 0 | 0 | 1 | 4 | 5 | 5 | 9 | 11 | 16 | 17 | 22 | 26 | 31 | 36 | 36 | 36 | 36 | 36 | 36 | 41 | 46 | —N/a | —N/a | —N/a |
| Position | 7th | 7th | 7th | 7th | 7th | 7th | 7th | 7th | 6th | 6th | 6th | 6th | 6th | 6th | 6th | 6th | 6th | 6th | 6th | 6th | 6th | —N/a | —N/a | —N/a |
| Key: | win | draw | loss | bye | | | | | | | | | | | | | | | | | | | | |

== Matches ==
The Cheetahs' matches in the 2018–19 Pro14 were:

| 1 September 2018 | Munster | 38–0 | Cheetahs | Thomond Park, Limerick |
| 17:15 | Try: Rory Scannell 15'; Dave Kilcoyne 30'; Tommy O'Donnell 52'; JJ Hanrahan 65'; Dave O'Callaghan 70'; Darren Sweetnam 72'; Con: JJ Hanrahan 31', 66', 71', 73' | Report | | Attendance: 12,265; Referee: Dan Jones |

| 8 September 2018 | Ospreys | 46–14 | Cheetahs | Liberty Stadium, Swansea |
| 17:30 | Try: Alun Wyn Jones 7', 77'; Scott Otten 27'; George North 36'; Alex Jeffries 58'; Justin Tipuric 62', 72'; Con: Sam Davies 8', 27', 59', 63'; Pen: Sam Davies 40' | Report | Try: Jasper Wiese 17'; Rabz Maxwane 69'; Con: Tian Schoeman 18', 69' | Attendance: 6,155; Referee: Andrew Brace |

| 15 September 2018 | Cheetahs | 24–52 | Glasgow Warriors | Toyota Stadium, Bloemfontein |
| 19:30 | Try: William Small-Smith 8'; Malcolm Jaer 11', 54'; Nico Lee 29'; Con: Benhard Janse van Rensburg 12'; Tian Schoeman 30'; Cards: Malcolm Jaer (yellow card) 41' to 51' | Report | Try: Adam Hastings 1'; Ali Price 24', 45'; Tommy Seymour 41'; D. T. H. van der Merwe 50'; Callum Gibbins 64'; George Horne 75'; Con: Adam Hastings 2', 25', 42', 45', 51', 65', 76'; Pen: Adam Hastings 61'; Cards: Alex Dunbar (yellow card) 13' to 23' | Attendance: 4,700; Referee: Frank Murphy |

| 21 September 2018 | Cheetahs | 39–39 | Ulster | Toyota Stadium, Bloemfontein |
| 19:15 | Try: Gerhard Olivier 1'; William Small-Smith 37'; Joseph Dweba 57'; Jacques du Toit 63'; Rabz Maxwane 74'; Con: Tian Schoeman 2', 38', 64'; Louis Fouché 74'; Pen: Tian Schoeman 18'; Louis Fouché 78'; Cards: Charles Marais (yellow card) 73' | Report | Try: David Shanahan 3', 21'; Johnny Stewart 67' penalty try 73'; Henry Speight 80'; Con: Billy Burns 4', 22', 80'; Pen: Billy Burns 45', 55'; Cards: Alan O'Connor (yellow card) 51' to 61' | Attendance: 5,063; Referee: Ben Whitehouse |

| 28 September 2018 | Cardiff Blues | 24–21 | Cheetahs | Cardiff Arms Park, Cardiff |
| 19:35 | Try: Rey Lee-Lo 25'; Lloyd Williams 64'; Olly Robinson 69'; Con: Gareth Anscombe 26', 65', 70'; Pen: Gareth Anscombe 38' | Report | Try: Walt Steenkamp 18'; Rabz Maxwane 49'; Benhard Janse van Rensburg 58'; Con: Tian Schoeman 19', 50', 59' | Attendance: 6,187; Referee: George Clancy |

| 5 October 2018 | Edinburgh | 37–21 | Cheetahs | Murrayfield Stadium, Edinburgh |
| 19:35 | Try: Ben Toolis 20'; Darcy Graham 38'; Viliame Mata 64'; Jamie Ritchie 77'; Con: Simon Hickey 21', 40', 65', 79'; Pen: Simon Hickey 4', 9', 52' | Report | Try: Nico Lee 35'; Rabz Maxwane 42', 48'; Con: Tian Schoeman 36', 44', 49'; Cards: Charles Marais (yellow card) 77' | Attendance: 4,555; Referee: Marius Mitrea |

| 27 October 2018 | Cheetahs | 21–10 | Cardiff Blues | Toyota Stadium, Bloemfontein |
| 19:15 | Try: Shaun Venter 7'; Rabz Maxwane 10', 38'; Con: Tian Schoeman 8', 11', 39' | Report | Try: Samu Manoa 64'; Con: Steven Shingler 65'; Pen: Steven Shingler 21' | Attendance: 4,428; Referee: Lloyd Linton |

| 4 November 2018 | Cheetahs | 26–30 | Munster | Toyota Stadium, Bloemfontein |
| 16:45 | Try: Joseph Dweba 26', 57'; Ox Nché 51'; Rhyno Smith 63'; Con: Tian Schoeman 52', 58', 64' | Report | Try: Arno Botha 15'; Kevin O'Byrne 37'; Liam Coombes 44'; Mike Haley 68'; Con: Bill Johnston 39', 46'; Pen: Bill Johnston 10'; Rory Scannell 76'; Cards: Chris Cloete (yellow card) 26' to 36' | Attendance: 3,368; Referee: Marius Mitrea |

| 24 November 2018 | Cheetahs | 31–25 | Benetton | Toyota Stadium, Bloemfontein |
| 14:30 | Try: Nico Lee 7'; Shaun Venter 44'; Daniel Maartens 58', 72'; Con: Tian Schoeman 8', 45', 59'; Louis Fouché 73'; Pen: Louis Fouché 76' | Report | Try: Marco Zanon 3'; Dewaldt Duvenage 28'; Ian McKinley 68'; Con: Ian McKinley 29', 70'; Pen: Ian McKinley 14', 48' | Attendance: 2,846; Referee: Craig Evans |

| 1 December 2018 | Cheetahs | 17–21 | Connacht | Toyota Stadium, Bloemfontein |
| 17:00 | Try: Malcolm Jaer 30'; Joseph Dweba 35'; Shaun Venter 71'; Con: Tian Schoeman 72' | Report | Try: Tom Farrell 5'; Gavin Thornbury 27'; Con: Jack Carty 7'; Pen: Jack Carty 21'; David Horwitz 57', 64' | Attendance: 3,270; Referee: Dan Jones |

| 6 January 2019 | Zebre | 12–27 | Cheetahs | Stadio Sergio Lanfranchi, Parma |
| 14:00 | Try: Edoardo Padovani 28'; Giulio Bisegni 31'; Con: Carlo Canna 32' | Report | Try: Benhard Janse van Rensburg 18', 42'; Rabz Maxwane 22'; Reinach Venter 74'; Daniel Maartens 78'; Con: Tian Schoeman 20'; Cards: George Biagi (yellow card) 73' | Attendance: 1,700; Referee: Dan Jones |

| 18 January 2019 | Southern Kings | 17–24 | Cheetahs | Nelson Mandela Bay Stadium, Port Elizabeth |
| 19:00 | Try: Ntabeni Dukisa 42' penalty try 72'; Con: Masixole Banda 42'; Pen: Masixole Banda 48' | Report | Try: Rabz Maxwane 6'; Junior Pokomela 45'; Luan de Bruin 80'; Con: Tian Schoeman 8', 46'; Louis Fouché 80'; Pen: Benhard Janse van Rensburg 63'; Cards: Tian Meyer (yellow card) 16' to 26'; Luan de Bruin (yellow card) 72' to 80' | Attendance: 3,872; Referee: Quinton Immelman |

| 26 January 2019 | Cheetahs | 61–28 | Zebre | Toyota Stadium, Bloemfontein |
| 15:00 | Try: Rabz Maxwane 1'; Malcolm Jaer 13'; Sintu Manjezi 19'; Abongile Nonkontwana 30'; Ox Nché 46'; Shaun Venter 61', 76'; Junior Pokomela 64'; Benhard Janse van Rensburg 79'; Con: Tian Schoeman 14', 19', 32', 47', 62', 66', 78', 80'; Cards: Justin Basson (red card) 73' | Report | Try: Paula Balekana 5'; Johan Meyer 50'; Apisai Tauyavuca 53'; George Biagi 71'; Con: Carlo Canna 6', 50', 53', 71' | Attendance: 6,360; Referee: Ben Whitehouse |

| 2 February 2019 | Cheetahs | 40–36 | Southern Kings | Toyota Stadium, Bloemfontein |
| 16:00 | Try: Shaun Venter 6'; Tian Schoeman 14'; William Small-Smith 22'; Malcolm Jaer 54'; Junior Pokomela 62'; Reinach Venter 65'; Con: Tian Schoeman 7', 15', 56', 63', 66'; Cards: Joseph Dweba (yellow card) 32' to 42'; William Small-Smith (yellow card) 38' to 48' | Report | Try: CJ Velleman 33'; Yaw Penxe 46'; Tienie Burger 72'; Alandré van Rooyen 75'; Berton Klaasen 80'; Con: Masixole Banda 34', 73', 76', 80'; Pen: Masixole Banda 2'; Cards: Meli Rokoua (yellow card) 21' to 31'; CJ Velleman (red card) 62' | Attendance: 4,298; Referee: Stuart Berry |

| 16 February 2019 | Connacht | 25–17 | Cheetahs | Galway Sportsgrounds, Galway |
| 17:30 | Try: Tom Farrell 24'; Tom McCartney 45'; Jarrad Butler 78'; Con: Jack Carty 26', 47'; Pen: Jack Carty 16', 72' | Report | Try: Rabz Maxwane 10'; Louis Fouché 20'; Shaun Venter 59'; Con: Tian Schoeman 12'; Cards: Nico Lee (yellow card) 32' to 42' | Attendance: 4,933; Referee: Nigel Owens |

| 24 February 2019 | Scarlets | 43–21 | Cheetahs | Parc y Scarlets, Llanelli |
| 13:00 | Try: Uzair Cassiem 2'; Johnny McNicholl 8'; Kieron Fonotia 12'; Josh Macleod 19'; Wyn Jones 42'; Paul Asquith 68'; Con: Dan Jones 3'; Leigh Halfpenny 9', 13', 20', 43'; Pen: Leigh Halfpenny 55'; Cards: Johnny McNicholl (yellow card) 22' to 32' | Report | Try: Benhard Janse van Rensburg 28'; Rabz Maxwane 38'; Gerhard Olivier 51'; Con: Tian Schoeman 29', 39', 52' | Attendance: 7,200; Referee: John Lacey |

| 1 March 2019 | Leinster | 19–7 | Cheetahs | RDS Arena, Dublin |
| 19:35 | Try: Conor O'Brien 10'; Adam Byrne 23'; Rory O'Loughlin 55'; Con: Ross Byrne 11', 56' | Report | Try: Rabz Maxwane 14'; Con: Tian Schoeman 14'; Cards: Ox Nché (yellow card) 9' to 19' | Attendance: 10,057; Referee: Nigel Owens |

| 23 March 2019 | Glasgow Warriors | 35–17 | Cheetahs | Scotstoun Stadium, Glasgow |
| 19:45 | Try: Callum Gibbins 5'; Kyle Steyn 17'; Rory Hughes 28'; Stafford McDowall 56'; Scott Cummings 76'; Con: Peter Horne 6', 18', 28'; Adam Hastings 58', 77' | Report | Try: William Small-Smith 14', 77'; Joseph Dweba 45'; Con: Tian Schoeman 46'; Cards: Charles Marais (yellow card) 36' to 46' | Attendance: 7,246; Referee: George Clancy |

| 6 April 2019 | Cheetahs | 14–31 | Ospreys | Toyota Stadium, Bloemfontein |
| 16:30 | Try: Dries Swanepoel 41'; Reinach Venter 71'; Con: Tian Schoeman 42', 72' | Report | Try: Dan Evans 25'; Olly Cracknell 29'; Justin Tipuric 43'; Cory Allen 54'; Con: Luke Price 26', 30'; Sam Davies 44', 55'; Pen: Sam Davies 67'; Cards: Adam Beard (yellow card) 71' | Attendance: 4,638; Referee: John Lacey |

| 13 April 2019 | Cheetahs | 38–13 | Dragons | Toyota Stadium, Bloemfontein |
| 18:35 | Try: Henco Venter 39'; Shaun Venter 62'; Tian Schoeman 73'; Louis Fouché 77'; Rabz Maxwane 79'; Con: Tian Schoeman 40', 63', 74', 78', 80'; Pen: Tian Schoeman 4'; Cards: Aranos Coetzee (yellow card) 57' to 67' | Report | Try: Taine Basham 43'; Con: Josh Lewis 44'; Pen: Josh Lewis 29', 58' | Attendance: 4,108; Referee: Sean Gallagher |

| 27 April 2019 | Cheetahs | 61–25 | Southern Kings | Toyota Stadium, Bloemfontein |
| 17:30 | Try: Abongile Nonkontwana 8'; Walt Steenkamp 17'; Joseph Dweba 28'; Shaun Venter 39', 63'; Louis Fouché 41'; Benhard Janse van Rensburg 55'; Malcolm Jaer 70'; Boan Venter 80'; Con: Tian Schoeman 10', 18', 30', 40', 56', 64', 71', 80' | Report | Try: Harlon Klaasen 34', 46'; Bjorn Basson 50'; Con: Masixole Banda 35', 46'; Pen: Masixole Banda 3', 13'; Cards: Meli Rokoua (yellow card) 28' to 38' |

== Player statistics ==
The Pro14 appearance record for players that represented the Cheetahs in 2018–19 is as follows:

2018–19 Cheetahs player statistics
| Player name | MUN | OSP | GLA | ULS | CAR | EDI | CAR | MUN | BEN | CON | ZEB | KIN | ZEB | KIN | CON | SCA | LEI | GLA | OSP | DRA | KIN | App | Try | Con | Pen | DG | Pts |
|---|---|---|---|---|---|---|---|---|---|---|---|---|---|---|---|---|---|---|---|---|---|---|---|---|---|---|---|
| Ox Nché | 1 | 1 | 17 (substituted on) | 1 | 1 | 1 | 1 | 1 | 1 | 1 | 1 | 1 | 1 | | 1 | 1 | 1 | | | | | 16 | 2 | 0 | 0 | 0 | 10 |
| Jacques du Toit | 2 | 2 | 16 (substituted on) | 16 (substituted on) | 16 (substituted on) | 2 | | | | | | | | | 16 | 16 (substituted on) | 16 (substituted on) | | | | | 8 | 1 | 0 | 0 | 0 | 5 |
| Luan de Bruin | 3 | 3 | | | | | | | | | 18 (substituted on) | 18 (substituted on) | 18 (substituted on) | 18 (substituted on) | 18 (substituted on) | 18 (substituted on) | 18 (substituted on) | 17 (substituted on) | 3 | 3 | | 12 | 1 | 0 | 0 | 0 | 5 |
| Justin Basson | 4 | 4 | | 19 (substituted on) | 19 (substituted on) | 4 | | 19 (substituted on) | 4 | 19 (substituted on) | 4 | 4 | 19 (substituted on) | | | | | 19 (substituted on) | | | | 12 | 0 | 0 | 0 | 0 | 0 |
| JP du Preez | 5 | 5 | 5 | 5 | 5 | 5 | 5 | 5 | | 5 | 5 | 5 | 20 (substituted on) | 19 (substituted on) | 5 | 5 | 5 | 20 (substituted on) | 19 (substituted on) | 5 | 5 | 20 | 0 | 0 | 0 | 0 | 0 |
| Junior Pokomela | 6 | 6 | 7 | 7 | 7 | 7 | 7 | 7 | 7 | 6 | 7 | 7 | 6 | 7 | 7 | 7 | 8 | | | | | 17 | 3 | 0 | 0 | 0 | 15 |
| Oupa Mohojé | 7 | | | | | | | | | | | | | | | | | | | | | 1 | 0 | 0 | 0 | 0 | 0 |
| Jasper Wiese | 8 | 8 | | | | | | | | | | | | 20 (substituted on) | 4 | 20 (substituted on) | | | 20 (substituted on) | 20 (substituted on) | 20 (substituted on) | 8 | 1 | 0 | 0 | 0 | 5 |
| Shaun Venter | 9 | 9 | 22 (substituted on) | 21 (substituted on) | 22 (substituted on) | 22 (substituted on) | 9 | 9 | 9 | 9 | | 22 (substituted on) | 22 (substituted on) | 9 | 9 | 9 | 23 (substituted on) | 22 (substituted on) | 9 | 9 | 9 | 20 | 10 | 0 | 0 | 0 | 50 |
| Tian Schoeman | 10 | 10 | 10 | 10 | 10 | 10 | 10 | 10 | 10 | 22 (substituted on) | 10 | 10 | 10 | 10 | 10 | 10 | 10 | 10 | 10 | 10 | 10 | 21 | 2 | 59 | 2 | 0 | 134 |
| William Small-Smith | 11 | 11 | 14 | 14 | 14 | 14 | 12 | 14 | 23 (substituted on) | 13 | 14 | 14 | 14 | 14 | 14 | 14 | 14 | 14 | 14 | | | 19 | 5 | 0 | 0 | 0 | 25 |
| Nico Lee | 12 | 12 | 12 | 12 | 12 | 12 | 23 (substituted on) | 12 | 12 | 12 | 12 | 12 | 12 | 12 | 12 | | | | | | | 15 | 3 | 0 | 0 | 0 | 15 |
| Benhard Janse van Rensburg | 13 | 13 | 13 | 13 | 13 | 13 | 13 | 13 | 13 | 23 (substituted on) | 13 | 13 | 13 | 13 | | 13 | 13 | 13 | 13 | 13 | 13 | 20 | 6 | 1 | 1 | 0 | 35 |
| Rabz Maxwane | 14 | 14 | 11 | 11 | 11 | 11 | 11 | 11 | 11 | | 11 | 11 | 11 | 11 | 11 | 11 | 11 | 11 | 11 | 11 | 11 | 20 | 14 | 0 | 0 | 0 | 70 |
| Malcolm Jaer | 15 | 15 | 15 | 15 | | | 15 | | 15 | 15 | 15 | 15 | 15 | 15 | | | | 15 | 15 | 15 | 22 (substituted on) | 15 | 6 | 0 | 0 | 0 | 30 |
| Joseph Dweba | 16 (substituted on) | 16 (substituted on) | 2 | 2 | 2 | 16 (substituted on) | 2 | 2 | 2 | 2 | 2 | 2 | 2 | 2 | | | | 16 (substituted on) | 2 | 2 | 2 | 18 | 6 | 0 | 0 | 0 | 30 |
| Charles Marais | 17 (substituted on) | 17 (substituted on) | 1 | 17 (substituted on) | 17 (substituted on) | 17 (substituted on) | 17 (substituted on) | 17 (substituted on) | 17 (substituted on) | 17 (substituted on) | 17 (substituted on) | 17 (substituted on) | 17 (substituted on) | 1 | | | 17 (substituted on) | 1 | 1 | 1 | 1 | 19 | 0 | 0 | 0 | 0 | 0 |
| Aranos Coetzee | 18 (substituted on) | 18 (substituted on) | 3 | 3 | 3 | 3 | 3 | 3 | 3 | 18 (substituted on) | 3 | 3 | 3 | 3 | 3 | 3 | 3 | 3 | 17 (substituted on) | 17 (substituted on) | 3 | 21 | 0 | 0 | 0 | 0 | 0 |
| Walt Steenkamp | 19 (substituted on) | 19 (substituted on) | 4 | 4 | 4 | 19 (substituted on) | 4 | 4 | 5 | | 20 (substituted on) | 20 (substituted on) | 5 | 5 | 20 (substituted on) | 4 | 4 | 5 | 5 | 4 | 4 | 20 | 2 | 0 | 0 | 0 | 10 |
| Aidon Davis | 20 (substituted on) | 7 | 8 | | | | | 8 | | | | | | | | | | | | | | 4 | 0 | 0 | 0 | 0 | 0 |
| Tian Meyer | 21 (substituted on) | 21 (substituted on) | 9 | 9 | 9 | 9 | 21 (substituted on) | 22 (substituted on) | | | 9 | 9 | 9 | | 22 (substituted on) | 23 | 9 | 9 | | 14 | 14 | 16 | 0 | 0 | 0 | 0 | 0 |
| Ernst Stapelberg | 22 (substituted on) | 22 | | | | | | | | | | | | 23 (substituted on) | | | | | | | | 2 | 0 | 0 | 0 | 0 | 0 |
| Ryno Eksteen | 23 (substituted on) | 23 | 23 (substituted on) | 23 | 15 | | | | | | | | | | | | | | | | | 3 | 0 | 0 | 0 | 0 | 0 |
| Gerhard Olivier | | 20 (substituted on) | 6 | 6 | 6 | | 6 | 6 | 6 | 8 | 6 | 6 | 8 | 8 | 8 | 8 | 6 | 21 (substituted on) | 6 | 6 | | 18 | 2 | 0 | 0 | 0 | 10 |
| Marnus van der Merwe | | 21 (substituted on) | 21 (substituted on) | | | | | | 16 (substituted on) | 16 | | | | | 2 | 2 | 20 (substituted on) | 2 | 16 (substituted on) | 16 (substituted on) | | 9 | 0 | 0 | 0 | 0 | 0 |
| Günther Janse van Vuuren | | | 18 (substituted on) | 18 | 18 | 18 | | | | | | | | | | | | | | | | 1 | 0 | 0 | 0 | 0 | 0 |
| Dennis Visser | | | 19 (substituted on) | | | | | | | | | | | | | | | | | | | 1 | 0 | 0 | 0 | 0 | 0 |
| Niell Jordaan | | | 20 (substituted on) | 8 | 8 | 6 | 8 | | | | | | 21 (substituted on) | 21 (substituted on) | | | | | | | | 7 | 0 | 0 | 0 | 0 | 0 |
| Stephan Malan | | | | 20 (substituted on) | 20 (substituted on) | 8 | | | | | | | | | | | | | | | | 3 | 0 | 0 | 0 | 0 | 0 |
| Louis Fouché | | | | 22 (substituted on) | 23 (substituted on) | 15 | 22 (substituted on) | 23 | 22 (substituted on) | 10 | 23 | 23 (substituted on) | | | 15 | 15 | 15 | 23 (substituted on) | 22 (substituted on) | 22 (substituted on) | 15 | 14 | 3 | 3 | 2 | 0 | 27 |
| Daniel Maartens | | | | | 21 (substituted on) | 20 (substituted on) | | 20 (substituted on) | 8 | 20 (substituted on) | 8 | 8 | | | | | | 6 | | | | 8 | 3 | 0 | 0 | 0 | 15 |
| Abongile Nonkontwana | | | | | | 21 (substituted on) | 20 (substituted on) | 21 (substituted on) | 20 (substituted on) | 7 | 21 (substituted on) | 21 (substituted on) | 7 | 6 | 6 | 6 | 7 | 7 | 7 | 7 | 7 | 16 | 2 | 0 | 0 | 0 | 10 |
| Ali Mgijima | | | | | | 23 | | | | | | | | | | | | | | | | 0 | 0 | 0 | 0 | 0 | 0 |
| Rhyno Smith | | | | | | | 14 | 15 | 14 | 14 | | | | | | | | | | | | 4 | 1 | 0 | 0 | 0 | 5 |
| Reinach Venter | | | | | | | 16 (substituted on) | 16 (substituted on) | | | 16 (substituted on) | 16 (substituted on) | 16 (substituted on) | 16 (substituted on) | 17 (substituted on) | 17 | 2 | 18 (substituted on) | 18 (substituted on) | 18 (substituted on) | 16 (substituted on) | 12 | 3 | 0 | 0 | 0 | 15 |
| Erich de Jager | | | | | | | 18 (substituted on) | 18 (substituted on) | 18 (substituted on) | 3 | | | | 17 (substituted on) | | | | | | | 18 (substituted on) | 6 | 0 | 0 | 0 | 0 | 0 |
| Sintu Manjezi | | | | | | | 19 (substituted on) | | 19 (substituted on) | 4 | 19 (substituted on) | 19 (substituted on) | 4 | 4 | 19 (substituted on) | 19 (substituted on) | 19 (substituted on) | 4 | 4 | 19 (substituted on) | 19 (substituted on) | 14 | 1 | 0 | 0 | 0 | 5 |
| Rudy Paige | | | | | | | | | 21 (substituted on) | 21 (substituted on) | 22 (substituted on) | | | 22 (substituted on) | 23 (substituted on) | 22 (substituted on) | 22 (substituted on) | | 21 (substituted on) | 21 (substituted on) | 21 (substituted on) | 10 | 0 | 0 | 0 | 0 | 0 |
| Darren Adonis | | | | | | | | | | 11 | | | | | | | | | | 23 (substituted on) | 23 (substituted on) | 3 | 0 | 0 | 0 | 0 | 0 |
| Dries Swanepoel | | | | | | | | | | | | | 23 (substituted on) | | 13 | 12 | 12 | 12 | 12 | 12 | 12 | 8 | 1 | 0 | 0 | 0 | 5 |
| Henco Venter | | | | | | | | | | | | | | | 21 (substituted on) | 21 (substituted on) | 21 (substituted on) | 8 | 8 | 8 | 8 | 7 | 1 | 0 | 0 | 0 | 5 |
| Carel-Jan Coetzee | | | | | | | | | | | | | | | | | | | 23 (substituted on) | | | 1 | 0 | 0 | 0 | 0 | 0 |
| Boan Venter | | | | | | | | | | | | | | | | | | | | | 17 (substituted on) | 1 | 1 | 0 | 0 | 0 | 5 |
| Total | | | | | | | | | | | | | | | | | | | | | | 21 | 80 | 63 | 5 | 0 | 541 |
(c) denotes the team captain. For each match, the player's squad number is shown. Starting players are numbered 1 to 15, while the replacements are numbered 16 to 23. If a replacement made an appearance in the match, it is indicated by (substituted on) . "App" refers to the number of appearances made by the player, "Try" to the number of tries scored by the player, "Con" to the number of conversions kicked, "Pen" to the number of penalties kicked, "DG" to the number of drop goals kicked and "Pts" refer to the total number of points scored by the player. Dian Badenhorst, Adriaan Carelse, Louis Conradie, Ruben de Haas, Lloyd Greeff, Elandré Huggett, Johan Kotze, Tertius Kruger, Tapiwa Mafura, Vuyani Maqina, Zee Mkhabela, Sibabalo Qoma, Jannes Snyman, Niell Stannard, Luigy van Jaarsveld, Ntokozo Vidima and Quintin Vorster were named in the squad, but were never included in a matchday squad.

== See also ==
- Cheetahs
- Pro14
