= List of Cheetahs (rugby union) players =

This is a list of rugby union footballers who have played for the Cheetahs in Super Rugby, the Pro14 and the EPCR Challenge Cup. The list includes any player that has played in a regular season match, semi-final or final for the Cheetahs, ordered by debut date and name. The Cheetahs competed in Super Rugby in 1997 as Free State and as the Cheetahs between 2006 and 2017 and then in Super Rugby Unlocked in 2020, the Pro14 between 2017 and 2020 and the EPCR Challenge Cup since 2022.

== Super Rugby players ==
No.	Name	Caps	Tries	C	P	DG	Points	Debut	Last
1	Stephen Brink	9	4				20	02/03/1997	16/05/1997
2	Jaco Coetzee	11	1				5	02/03/1997	16/05/1997
3	Naka Drotské	11	3				15	02/03/1997	16/05/1997
4	Os du Randt	28	3				15	02/03/1997	05/05/2007
5	Braam Els	11	3				15	02/03/1997	16/05/1997
6	Rassie Erasmus	10	2				10	02/03/1997	16/05/1997
7	Hendrik Kruger	10	1		1		8	02/03/1997	10/05/1997
8	Jacobus Heymans	10						02/03/1997	16/05/1997
9	Helgard Müller	11	1				5	02/03/1997	16/05/1997
10	Ryno Opperman	5						02/03/1997	16/05/1997
11	Christo Potgieter	2						02/03/1997	07/03/1997
12	MJ Smith	8		5	14		52	02/03/1997	16/05/1997
13	Werner Swanepoel	10	2				10	02/03/1997	10/05/1997
14	André Venter	9	2				10	02/03/1997	16/05/1997
15	Brendan Venter	10	1				5	02/03/1997	16/05/1997
16	Charl van Rensburg	8	2				10	02/03/1997	16/05/1997
17	André Fourie	3						02/03/1997	26/04/1997
18	Jannie de Beer	8		19	15	1	86	07/03/1997	16/05/1997
19	Stuart Landman	6						07/03/1997	20/04/1997
20	Jan-Harm van Wyk	9	2				10	07/03/1997	16/05/1997
21	Chris Badenhorst	6	4				20	15/03/1997	16/05/1997
22	Chris Kruger	1						15/03/1997	15/03/1997
23	Dirk Groenewald	1						04/04/1997	04/04/1997
24	Willie Meyer	5						12/04/1997	16/05/1997
25	Harold Myburgh	1						16/05/1997	16/05/1997
26	Michael Claassens	20						10/02/2006	27/04/2007
27	Ronnie Cooke	24	5				25	10/02/2006	27/04/2007
28	Willem de Waal	15	2	18	20	1	109	10/03/2006	05/05/2007
29	Wian du Preez	59						10/02/2006	15/05/2010
30	Kabamba Floors	57	10				50	10/02/2006	28/05/2011
31	Bevin Fortuin	22	4	1		1	25	10/02/2006	17/05/2008
32	Eddie Fredericks	33	7				35	10/02/2006	17/05/2008
33	Barry Goodes	10	1				5	10/02/2006	13/05/2006
34	Trevor Leota	1						10/02/2006	10/02/2006
35	Barend Pieterse	33	2				10	10/02/2006	15/05/2010
36	Juan Smith	47	7				35	10/02/2006	25/02/2011
37	CJ van der Linde	19	2				10	10/02/2006	17/05/2008
38	Ryno van der Merwe	25	5				25	10/02/2006	05/05/2007
39	Corniel van Zyl	24						10/02/2006	05/05/2007
40	Sinethemba Zweni	5						10/02/2006	08/04/2006
41	Frans Viljoen	34	1				5	10/02/2006	10/05/2013
42	Jannie du Plessis	26						10/02/2006	05/05/2007
43	Meyer Bosman	61	4	27	38		188	10/02/2006	08/05/2010
44	Falie Oelschig	36	1			1	8	10/02/2006	10/05/2008
45	Tiaan Liebenberg	13	1				5	10/02/2006	13/05/2006
46	Ockie van Zyl	8						10/02/2006	13/05/2006
47	Gaffie du Toit	10	2		1	1	16	18/02/2006	13/05/2006
48	Giscard Peters	11	5				25	18/02/2006	13/05/2006
49	Gareth Krause	7						18/02/2006	29/04/2006
50	Ollie le Roux	21	1				5	18/02/2006	27/04/2007
51	Cobus Grobler	6						25/02/2006	21/04/2006
52	Keith Lowen	4						31/03/2006	29/04/2006
53	Hendro Scholtz	39	2				10	29/04/2006	15/05/2010
54	Bian Vermaak	9						13/05/2006	05/05/2007
55	Philip Burger	18	4				20	03/02/2007	06/05/2011
56	Marius Joubert	12						03/02/2007	05/05/2007
57	Herkie Kruger	9	2		1	2	19	03/02/2007	27/04/2007
58	Tiger Mangweni	7	1				5	03/02/2007	21/04/2007
59	Darron Nell	10	2				10	03/02/2007	28/03/2008
60	Adriaan Strauss	97	8				40	03/02/2007	12/07/2014
61	Richardt Strauss	36	2				10	03/02/2007	16/05/2009
62	Gavin Passens	9	3				15	24/02/2007	01/03/2008
63	Flip van der Merwe	6	1				5	02/03/2007	07/03/2009
64	Duane Vermeulen	20	3				15	10/03/2007	17/05/2008
65	Alwyn Hollenbach	2						10/03/2007	05/05/2007
66	Rory Duncan	19	2				10	17/03/2007	17/05/2008
67	Dewald Senekal	2						17/03/2007	06/04/2007
68	Tertius Carse	2						17/03/2007	01/05/2010
69	Hans van Dyk	6						30/03/2007	05/05/2007
70	Heinrich Brüssow	82	9				45	06/04/2007	18/04/2015
71	Jacobus Calldo	21						16/02/2008	05/03/2011
72	Hennie Daniller	90	9				45	16/02/2008	12/07/2014
73	JW Jonker	17	6				30	16/02/2008	25/03/2017
74	Jacques-Louis Potgieter	17	1	19	13	1	85	16/02/2008	18/04/2009
75	Conrad Barnard	12	1	12	6		47	16/02/2008	17/05/2008
76	David de Villiers	29	2				10	16/02/2008	06/03/2010
77	Bees Roux	17						16/02/2008	25/04/2009
78	Hendrik Meyer	9						22/02/2008	17/05/2008
79	Tobie Botes	3						22/02/2008	17/05/2008
80	Tewis de Bruyn	57	3	2	2		25	01/03/2008	13/04/2013
81	Jongi Nokwe	30	15				75	08/03/2008	01/05/2010
82	Ronnie Uys	2						08/03/2008	15/03/2008
83	Bjorn Basson	9	6				30	13/02/2009	15/05/2010
84	Nico Breedt	20	1				5	13/02/2009	17/04/2010
85	Danwel Demas	21	2				10	13/02/2009	08/05/2010
86	Corne Uys	27	7				35	13/02/2009	18/06/2011
87	Piet van Zyl	41	5				25	13/02/2009	21/07/2013
88	Fabian Juries	15						13/02/2009	26/03/2011
89	Wayne van Heerden	13	2				10	13/02/2009	16/05/2009
90	Hanno Coetzee	3						20/02/2009	21/03/2009
91	Sarel Pretorius	77	24				120	20/02/2009	13/06/2015
92	Jean Botha	2						01/03/2009	07/03/2009
93	Francois Uys	90	1	1			7	13/03/2009	27/05/2017
94	Naas Olivier	24	1	30	35	2	176	25/04/2009	21/05/2011
95	WP Nel	46	9				45	01/05/2009	14/07/2012
96	Gerrie Odendaal	1						16/05/2009	16/05/2009
97	Ashley Johnson	36	6				30	12/02/2010	14/07/2012
98	Lionel Mapoe	5	1				5	12/02/2010	20/03/2010
99	Riaan Viljoen	26	5	1	4	2	45	12/02/2010	18/06/2011
100	Coenie Oosthuizen	74	7				35	12/02/2010	18/04/2015
101	Waltie Vermeulen	26	1				5	12/02/2010	17/05/2014
102	Sias Ebersohn	31	2	36	44	2	220	12/02/2010	12/03/2016
103	Robert Ebersohn	59	11				55	06/03/2010	21/07/2013
104	Ryno Barnes	34	1				5	06/03/2010	19/04/2014
105	Davon Raubenheimer	20	2				10	03/04/2010	18/03/2012
106	Wilmaure Louw	6						10/04/2010	08/04/2011
107	Izak van der Westhuizen	25						10/04/2010	14/07/2012
108	Barry Geel	8						17/04/2010	30/03/2013
109	Philip van der Walt	49	5				25	17/04/2010	12/07/2014
110	Skipper Badenhorst	4						01/05/2010	26/03/2011
111	Marnus Hugo	2						08/05/2010	15/05/2010
112	Louis Strydom	1		1			2	15/05/2010	15/05/2010
113	Rayno Benjamin	58	15				75	19/02/2011	18/03/2017
114	Wilhelm Steenkamp	13	1				5	19/02/2011	21/05/2011
115	Andries Strauss	18	3				15	19/02/2011	14/07/2012
116	Philip Snyman	20	1				5	25/02/2011	14/07/2012
117	Martin Muller	11						05/03/2011	18/06/2011
118	Lourens Adriaanse	30						26/03/2011	21/07/2013
119	Riaan Smit	25	3	10	23		106	08/04/2011	26/04/2014
120	Leon Karemaker	2						08/04/2011	16/04/2011
121	Johan Wessels	4						21/05/2011	18/06/2011
122	Pieter Myburgh	2						04/06/2011	18/06/2011
123	Andries Ferreira	20	1				5	25/02/2012	03/05/2014
124	Johan Goosen	27	4	46	70	3	331	25/02/2012	12/07/2014
125	Rocco Jansen	4						25/02/2012	30/06/2012
126	Dusty Noble	1						25/02/2012	25/02/2012
127	Trevor Nyakane	42	3				15	25/02/2012	05/07/2014
128	Willie le Roux	58	18				90	25/02/2012	13/06/2015
129	Cameron Jacobs	9						03/03/2012	07/07/2012
130	George Earle	12						10/03/2012	07/07/2012
131	Justin Downey	12						10/03/2012	07/07/2012
132	Hercú Liebenberg	6						24/03/2012	14/07/2012
133	Lappies Labuschagné	27	2				10	30/06/2012	12/04/2014
134	Marcel van der Merwe	3						30/06/2012	14/07/2012
135	Nico Scheepers	3						30/06/2012	14/07/2012
136	Boom Prinsloo	51	14				70	14/07/2012	18/03/2017
137	Jacques Coetzee	1						14/07/2012	14/07/2012
138	Lood de Jager	40	1				5	23/02/2013	28/05/2016
139	Raymond Rhule	67	19				95	23/02/2013	14/07/2017
140	Johann Sadie	41	8				40	23/02/2013	25/04/2015
141	Rynard Landman	18						02/03/2013	07/03/2014
142	Burton Francis	6		7	15	1	62	30/03/2013	10/05/2013
143	Francois Brummer	4		4	3		17	13/04/2013	23/05/2015
144	Elgar Watts	19	1	17	16		87	27/04/2013	12/07/2014
145	Howard Mnisi	4	1				5	29/06/2013	21/11/2020
146	Cornal Hendricks	27	11				55	15/02/2014	06/06/2015
147	Caylib Oosthuizen	19						15/02/2014	02/05/2015
148	Francois Venter	44	14				70	15/02/2014	14/07/2017
149	Shaun Venter	46	1				5	15/02/2014	14/07/2017
150	Jean Cook	17	2				10	15/02/2014	21/03/2015
151	Maks van Dyk	39						15/02/2014	16/07/2016
152	Rossouw de Klerk	7						07/03/2014	26/04/2014
153	Oupa Mohojé	41	5				25	05/04/2014	21/11/2020
154	Torsten van Jaarsveld	48	10				50	26/04/2014	27/05/2017
155	Boela Serfontein	3						10/05/2014	24/05/2014
156	Hilton Lobberts	7	1				5	24/05/2014	22/04/2016
157	Carel Greeff	6	2				10	24/05/2014	30/05/2015
158	Tian Meyer	49	4				20	24/05/2014	21/11/2020
159	Gouws Prinsloo	1						24/05/2014	24/05/2014
160	Carl Wegner	47	3				15	05/07/2014	21/11/2020
161	Luan de Bruin	13						12/07/2014	14/11/2020
162	Henco Venter	30	1				5	12/07/2014	01/07/2017
163	Kevin Stevens	1						12/07/2014	12/07/2014
164	Clayton Blommetjies	44	6				30	14/02/2015	21/11/2020
165	Willie Britz	12						14/02/2015	07/05/2016
166	Danie Mienie	19						14/02/2015	18/03/2017
167	Joe Pietersen	11		19	16	2	92	14/02/2015	30/05/2015
168	Michael van der Spuy	18	3				15	14/02/2015	18/03/2017
169	Willie du Plessis	8		2	1		7	14/02/2015	25/04/2015
170	BG Uys	14						14/02/2015	13/06/2015
171	Tienie Burger	11						27/02/2015	06/06/2015
172	Steven Sykes	14	1				5	07/03/2015	13/06/2015
173	Stephan Coetzee	11						07/03/2015	30/05/2015
174	Coenie van Wyk	6		5			10	18/04/2015	13/06/2015
175	Sergeal Petersen	28	12				60	02/05/2015	01/07/2017
176	Dolph Botha	1						02/05/2015	02/05/2015
177	Danie Dames	1						02/05/2015	02/05/2015
178	Ewald van der Westhuizen	6						02/05/2015	13/06/2015
179	Niell Jordaan	19	1				5	06/06/2015	14/07/2017
180	Niel Marais	27	3	42	17		150	06/06/2015	14/07/2017
181	Gerhard Olivier	2						06/06/2015	13/06/2015
182	Elandré Huggett	16	3				15	06/06/2015	01/07/2017
183	Renier Botha	1						13/06/2015	13/06/2015
184	Uzair Cassiem	25	8				40	26/02/2016	14/07/2017
185	Charles Marais	33						26/02/2016	14/11/2020
186	William Small-Smith	18	3				15	26/02/2016	21/11/2020
187	Fred Zeilinga	29	1	37	40		187	26/02/2016	14/07/2017
188	Paul Schoeman	24	7				35	26/02/2016	05/05/2017
189	Ox Nché	25	2				10	26/02/2016	14/07/2017
190	Reniel Hugo	8	1				5	26/02/2016	14/07/2017
191	Jacques du Toit	11	2				10	26/02/2016	21/11/2020
192	Aranos Coetzee	22						12/03/2016	14/07/2017
193	Joubert Engelbrecht	1						26/03/2016	26/03/2016
194	Nico Lee	14						02/04/2016	29/04/2017
195	Armandt Koster	14						14/05/2016	14/07/2017
196	Joseph Dweba	6	1				5	02/07/2016	14/07/2017
197	George Whitehead	3		1			2	02/07/2016	16/07/2016
198	Justin Basson	5	1				5	25/02/2017	01/07/2017
199	Clinton Swart	11	4				20	25/02/2017	14/07/2017
200	Zee Mkhabela	2						25/02/2017	11/03/2017
201	Ali Mgijima	1						11/03/2017	11/03/2017
202	Ruan van Rensburg	5						11/03/2017	14/07/2017
203	Tom Botha	10						11/03/2017	14/07/2017
204	Luther Obi	1						01/04/2017	01/04/2017
205	Junior Pokomela	6	1				5	15/04/2017	14/11/2020
206	Chris Dry	2						01/07/2017	14/07/2017
207	Reinach Venter	6						14/07/2017	21/11/2020
208	Malcolm Jaer	4	3				15	10/10/2020	14/11/2020
209	Benhard Janse van Rensburg	2						10/10/2020	16/10/2020
210	Andisa Ntsila	5	1				5	10/10/2020	21/11/2020
211	Ruan Pienaar	2	1	5	1		18	10/10/2020	16/10/2020
212	Tian Schoeman	5		3	10		36	10/10/2020	21/11/2020
213	Rosko Specman	5	4				20	10/10/2020	21/11/2020
214	Walt Steenkamp	4						10/10/2020	21/11/2020
215	François Steyn	4						10/10/2020	21/11/2020
216	Jasper Wiese	2						10/10/2020	16/10/2020
217	JP du Preez	5						10/10/2020	21/11/2020
218	Louis van der Westhuizen	1						10/10/2020	10/10/2020
219	Boan Venter	5						10/10/2020	21/11/2020
220	Erich de Jager	2						10/10/2020	16/10/2020
221	Aidon Davis	4						10/10/2020	14/11/2020
222	Chris Massyn	3						10/10/2020	21/11/2020
223	Chris Smit	2						06/11/2020	14/11/2020
224	Jeandré Rudolph	3	1				5	06/11/2020	21/11/2020
225	Ruben de Haas	3	1				5	06/11/2020	21/11/2020
226	Khutha Mchunu	3						06/11/2020	21/11/2020
227	Ian Groenewald	2						14/11/2020	21/11/2020
228	Marnus van der Merwe	1						14/11/2020	14/11/2020
229	Reinhardt Fortuin	2		1			2	14/11/2020	21/11/2020
230	Rhyno Smith	1						21/11/2020	21/11/2020
231	Hencus van Wyk	1						21/11/2020	21/11/2020
232	Cameron Dawson	1						21/11/2020	21/11/2020

== Pro14 players ==
No.	Name	Caps	Tries	C	P	DG	Points	Debut	Last
1	Justin Basson	25						01/09/2017	23/03/2019
2	Clayton Blommetjies	25	10				50	01/09/2017	29/02/2020
3	Aranos Coetzee	52						01/09/2017	29/02/2020
4	Jacques du Toit	26	2				10	01/09/2017	01/03/2019
5	Reniel Hugo	21	1				5	01/09/2017	05/05/2018
6	Niell Jordaan	9						01/09/2017	02/02/2019
7	Makazole Mapimpi	13	10				50	01/09/2017	20/01/2018
8	Charles Marais	43						01/09/2017	29/02/2020
9	Ali Mgijima	3						01/09/2017	04/11/2017
10	Sergeal Petersen	7	3				15	01/09/2017	28/10/2017
11	Paul Schoeman	21	2				10	01/09/2017	05/05/2018
12	William Small-Smith	47	11	3			61	01/09/2017	29/02/2020
13	Rosko Specman	4	1				5	01/09/2017	06/10/2017
14	Henco Venter	27	2				10	01/09/2017	11/10/2019
15	Shaun Venter	36	13				65	01/09/2017	27/04/2019
16	Cecil Afrika	2						01/09/2017	16/09/2017
17	Rayno Benjamin	2						01/09/2017	09/09/2017
18	Rynier Bernardo	20	1				5	01/09/2017	05/05/2018
19	Ox Nché	42	6				30	01/09/2017	26/10/2019
20	Torsten van Jaarsveld	21	6				30	01/09/2017	05/05/2018
21	Tian Meyer	44	5				25	01/09/2017	29/02/2020
22	Tom Botha	20						01/09/2017	05/05/2018
23	Gerhard Olivier	30	2				10	01/09/2017	29/02/2020
24	Robbie Petzer	1		1	2		8	09/09/2017	09/09/2017
25	Francois Venter	16	3				15	09/09/2017	05/05/2018
26	Armandt Koster	1						09/09/2017	09/09/2017
27	Luther Obi	6	2				10	16/09/2017	03/03/2018
28	Junior Pokomela	40	7				35	16/09/2017	29/02/2020
29	Ernst Stapelberg	8		15	14		72	16/09/2017	02/02/2019
30	Chris Dry	1						16/09/2017	16/09/2017
31	Nico Lee	29	9				45	16/09/2017	16/02/2019
32	Oupa Mohojé	17	2				10	22/09/2017	01/09/2018
33	Raymond Rhule	2						29/09/2017	28/10/2017
34	Fred Zeilinga	12	1	24	11		86	28/10/2017	07/04/2018
35	Carl Wegner	12						28/10/2017	05/05/2018
36	Tertius Kruger	2						04/11/2017	24/11/2017
37	Jasper Wiese	19	3				15	04/11/2017	22/02/2020
38	Dennis Visser	2						04/11/2017	15/09/2018
39	Craig Barry	13	4				20	24/11/2017	29/02/2020
40	Daniel Maartens	11	3				15	24/11/2017	01/02/2020
41	Rabz Maxwane	31	19				95	02/12/2017	15/02/2020
42	Uzair Cassiem	12	4				20	06/01/2018	05/05/2018
43	AJ Coertzen	5						06/01/2018	07/04/2018
44	Niel Marais	12	1	14	10		63	06/01/2018	05/05/2018
45	Zee Mkhabela	9						06/01/2018	05/05/2018
46	Joseph Dweba	31	13				65	20/01/2018	29/02/2020
47	Clinton Swart	6						20/01/2018	05/05/2018
48	Malcolm Jaer	18	7				35	10/02/2018	27/04/2019
49	Luan de Bruin	25	2				10	16/02/2018	29/02/2020
50	Erich de Jager	11						24/03/2018	25/01/2020
51	Johan Goosen	3		2	2		10	13/04/2018	05/05/2018
52	Lloyd Greeff	2						28/04/2018	05/05/2018
53	JP du Preez	32						01/09/2018	29/02/2020
54	Benhard Janse van Rensburg	33	6	1	1		35	01/09/2018	29/02/2020
55	Tian Schoeman	33	2	67	5		159	01/09/2018	29/02/2020
56	Aidon Davis	11	1				5	01/09/2018	29/02/2020
57	Walt Steenkamp	33	2				10	01/09/2018	29/02/2020
58	Ryno Eksteen	3						01/09/2018	27/10/2018
59	Marnus van der Merwe	11						08/09/2018	04/01/2020
60	Günther Janse van Vuuren	1						15/09/2018	15/09/2018
61	Stephan Malan	3						21/09/2018	05/10/2018
62	Louis Fouché	23	5	5	2		41	21/09/2018	29/02/2020
63	Abongile Nonkontwana	16	2				10	05/10/2018	27/04/2019
64	Rhyno Smith	17	11				55	27/10/2018	29/02/2020
65	Sintu Manjezi	25	3				15	27/10/2018	29/02/2020
66	Reinach Venter	16	4				20	27/10/2018	30/11/2019
67	Rudy Paige	10						24/11/2018	27/04/2019
68	Darren Adonis	3						01/12/2018	27/04/2019
69	Dries Swanepoel	11	1				5	26/01/2019	26/10/2019
70	Carel-Jan Coetzee	1						06/04/2019	06/04/2019
71	Boan Venter	14	1				5	27/04/2019	29/02/2020
72	Ruan Pienaar	12	1	25	6		73	27/09/2019	22/02/2020
73	Anthony Volmink	6	3				15	27/09/2019	25/01/2020
74	Sias Koen	7	1				5	27/09/2019	29/02/2020
75	Neethling Fouché	2						05/10/2019	11/10/2019
76	Wilmar Arnoldi	10	3				15	26/10/2019	29/02/2020
77	George Whitehead	4			1		3	02/11/2019	25/01/2020
78	Chris Massyn	6	1				5	30/11/2019	22/02/2020
79	Chris Smit	5						30/11/2019	29/02/2020

== EPCR Challenge Cup players ==
No.	Name	Caps	Tries	C	P	DG	Points	Debut	Last
1	David Brits	5						08/12/2022	01/04/2023
2	Aranos Coetzee	14						08/12/2022	18/01/2026
3	Schalk Ferreira	11						08/12/2022	14/12/2024
4	Reinhardt Fortuin	8	2				10	08/12/2022	20/01/2024
5	Daniel Kasende	8	2				10	08/12/2022	06/04/2024
6	Tapiwa Mafura	10	1				5	08/12/2022	06/04/2024
7	Siya Masuku	4		2	5		19	08/12/2022	22/01/2023
8	Oupa Mohojé	6	1				5	08/12/2022	14/12/2024
9	Friedle Olivier	13	1				5	08/12/2022	18/01/2025
10	Ruan Pienaar	8	1	18	11		74	08/12/2022	06/04/2024
11	Jeandré Rudolph	14	3				15	08/12/2022	18/01/2025
12	Victor Sekekete	16						08/12/2022	18/10/2026
13	François Steyn	1						08/12/2022	08/12/2022
14	Louis van der Westhuizen	17	6				30	08/12/2022	18/10/2026
15	Mzwanele Zito	6						08/12/2022	06/04/2024
16	Daniel Maartens	16	5				25	08/12/2022	18/01/2026
17	Rynier Bernardo	9	1				5	08/12/2022	20/01/2024
18	Marko Janse van Rensburg	8	1				5	08/12/2022	18/01/2026
19	Mzamo Majola	2						08/12/2022	17/12/2022
20	Hencus van Wyk	13						08/12/2022	18/01/2025
21	Robert Ebersohn	5						08/12/2022	01/04/2023
22	Rewan Kruger	13						08/12/2022	18/01/2026
23	Sibabalo Qoma	8	2				10	08/12/2022	06/04/2024
24	Munier Hartzenberg	14	5				25	17/12/2022	18/01/2026
25	Andell Loubser	3						13/01/2023	06/04/2024
26	Alulutho Tshakweni	8						13/01/2023	06/04/2024
27	Branden de Kock	2						08/12/2022	01/04/2023
28	Evardi Boshoff	5						22/01/2023	20/01/2024
29	Gideon van der Merwe	11	1				5	01/04/2023	18/01/2026
30	Marnus van der Merwe	4	3				15	01/04/2023	20/01/2024
31	Nqoba Mxoli	1						01/04/2023	01/04/2023
32	Cohen Jasper	10	4	2	1		27	01/04/2023	18/10/2026
33	George Lourens	7						09/12/2023	13/12/2025
34	Laurence Victor	5						09/12/2023	18/01/2025
35	Siba Xamlashe	1						09/12/2023	09/12/2023
36	Ali Mgijima	7						09/12/2023	18/01/2025
37	Carl Wegner	11						09/12/2023	18/10/2026
38	Cameron Dawson	4						17/12/2023	18/01/2026
39	Abner van Reenen	2						20/01/2024	06/04/2024
40	Litha Nkula	2						06/04/2024	18/01/2025
41	Michael Annies	7	3				15	08/12/2024	18/10/2026
42	Carel-Jan Coetzee	5	1				5	08/12/2024	18/10/2026
43	Ruben de Haas	4	1				5	08/12/2024	18/01/2025
44	Prince Nkabinde	7	2				10	08/12/2024	18/10/2026
45	Ethan Wentzel	3		4	3		17	08/12/2024	12/01/2025
46	Robert Hunt	2						08/12/2024	14/12/2024
47	Vernon Paulo	6						08/12/2024	13/12/2025
48	Pierre-Raymond Uys	6						08/12/2024	13/12/2025
49	Pieter Jansen van Vuren	3						12/01/2025	18/01/2026
50	Corné Fourie	2						12/01/2025	18/01/2025
51	Jandré Nel	4	1				5	12/01/2025	13/12/2025
52	Sisonke Vumazonke	5						12/01/2025	18/01/2026
53	Franco Smith	1						18/01/2025	18/01/2025
54	Neels Volschenk	5	1				5	18/01/2025	18/10/2026
55	De-An Ackermann	3						07/12/2025	18/01/2026
56	Zander du Plessis	3	1				5	07/12/2025	18/10/2026
57	Marco Jansen van Vuren	4						07/12/2025	18/10/2026
58	Jaco van der Walt	2		4			8	07/12/2025	18/01/2026
59	Juan Venter	2						07/12/2025	13/12/2025
60	Frankie Dos Reis	4						07/12/2025	18/10/2026
61	Tielman Nieuwoudt	1						07/12/2025	07/12/2025
62	Clayton Blommetjies	1						13/12/2025	13/12/2025
63	Matome Manyama	3						13/12/2025	18/10/2026
64	Curtly Thomas	2						13/12/2025	18/01/2026
65	James Verity-Amm	1						18/01/2026	18/01/2026
66	Arno van der Merwe	1						18/01/2026	18/01/2026
67	Faf de Klerk	1						18/10/2026	18/10/2026
68	Carl Els	1						18/10/2026	18/10/2026
69	Henry Immelman	1						18/10/2026	18/10/2026
70	Simon Miller	1						18/10/2026	18/10/2026
71	Tiaan Swanepoel	1		3	2		12	18/10/2026	18/10/2026
72	Tebogo Nkosi	1						18/10/2026	18/10/2026
73	Erich Visser	1						18/10/2026	18/10/2026
74	Ben Pitout	1						18/10/2026	18/10/2026
75	Aidon Davis	1						18/10/2026	18/10/2026
76	Juandre Schoeman	1						18/10/2026	18/10/2026
77	Siya Ningiza	1						18/10/2026	18/10/2026
