= Armandt Koster =

South African rugby union player

- Born: 20 January 1990 (age 36) Vryheid, South Africa
- Height: 1.94 m (6 ft 4 1/2 in)
- Weight: 114 kg (17 st 13 lb; 251 lb)
- School: Hoërskool Pionier, Vryheid
- University: University of the Free State

Rugby union career
- Position: Flanker / Lock
Youth career
- 2011: Free State Cheetahs
Amateur team(s)
Years	Team	Apps	(Points)
2012–2015	UFS Shimlas	14	(10)
Senior career
Years	Team	Apps	(Points)
2012	Free State XV	2	(0)
2012–2015	Griffons	28	(15)
2015–2018	Free State Cheetahs	15	(0)
2016–2019	Cheetahs	15	(0)
2016	Free State XV	7	(0)
2018–2020	Bayonne	13	(0)
- Correct as of 22 April 2018

Armandt Koster (born 20 January 1990) is a South African professional rugby union player. His regular position is flanker or lock.

== Career ==
=== Youth and Varsity Cup rugby ===
Koster was included in the Free State U21 squad for the 2011 Under-21 Provincial Championship, but didn't make any appearances for them. In 2012, he was included in the UFS Shimlas squad for the 2012 Varsity Cup. He played seven times for Shimlas, scoring tries in their matches against TUT Vikings and NWU Pukke. He returned to make two substitute appearances during the 2013 Varsity Cup and started in five matches for Shimlas during the 2014 Varsity Cup.

=== Free State ===
After his first season of Varsity Cup rugby, he was included in the Free State XV squad for the 2012 Vodacom Cup. He made his first class debut when he played off the bench in their match against the Sharks XV in Bloemfontein. A week later, he started their next match against the Eastern Province Kings in Port Elizabeth, but that turned out to be his only two appearances for the Bloemfontein-based side.

=== Griffons ===
Koster joined Welkom-based side Griffons for the 2012 Currie Cup First Division competition. He made his Currie Cup debut in their 53–33 victory over the Border Bulldogs in East London. Three more appearances off the bench followed before Koster started the final two matches of the season, both of those against the Pumas – first a 39–29 victory for the Griffons in the final match of the regular season and then in the semi-final, where the Griffons lost 37–30.

Koster started five matches for the Griffons during the 2013 Vodacom Cup competition and returned for the 2014 Vodacom Cup competition, where he made three appearances. He made six appearances for the Griffons during the 2014 Currie Cup qualification competition; during this competition, he scored his first senior try in their match against the Leopards and followed it up with further tries in their next two matches against the Border Bulldogs and the Falcons. The Griffons finished third in the competition to remain in the First Division in 2014.

Koster appeared in all seven of the Griffons' matches in the 2014 Currie Cup First Division campaign to help them finish the group stage in second place behind the Leopards. He started their semi-final match against the SWD Eagles, where the Griffons ran out 45–43 winners and was once again in the starting line-up for the final against the Falcons. He played the full 80 minutes of the match as the Griffons ran out 23–21 winners to win their first silverware for six years.

Shortly after the conclusion of the 2014 Currie Cup First Division, Koster was also included in the Cheetahs' wider training squad as part of their preparations for the 2015 Super Rugby season.

=== Grenoble ===
Koster joined French Pro D2 side Grenoble, but failed a medical when he was diagnosed with a cervical disc herniation and returned to South Africa for surgery.
