= Rory Duncan =

South African rugby union player & coach

- Born: 26 July 1977 (age 49) Durban, South Africa
- Height: 1.94 m (6 ft 4 1/2 in)
- Weight: 118 kg (260 lb; 18 st 8 lb)
- School: Grey High School

Rugby union career
- Position: Lock
Senior career
| Years | Team | Apps | (Points) |
| 1999–2001 | Natal Wildebeest | | |
| 2002–2005 | Mighty Elephants | | |
| 2006–2008 | Free State Cheetahs | 32 | (15) |
| 2007–2008 | Cheetahs | 19 | (10) |
| 2008–2010 | Yamaha Júbilo | | |
| 2008–2010 | Eastern Province Kings | 10 | (0) |
- Correct as of 9 February 2018
Coaching career
- Years: Team
- 2012–2013: Grey High School
- 2014–2017: Free State XV / Free State U21
- 2014–2017: Cheetahs / Free State Cheetahs (Director of Rugby)
- 2017–2018: Cheetahs
- 2018–2020: Worcester Warriors

Rory Duncan (born 26 July 1977) is a former South African rugby union coach and former player.

He started his career at the Sharks, representing them in the Vodacom Cup in 1999 and 2001. He then the joined Mighty Elephants in 2002, where he played for four seasons before moving to the Free State Cheetahs in 2006. Between 2008 and 2010, he had a spell at Japanese Top League club Yamaha Júbilo before returning to the Eastern Province Kings for the 2010 Currie Cup season. He announced his retirement at the end of 2011.

After two seasons as head coach at Grey High School, Duncan joined the Free State Cheetahs in November 2013 to become the coach of their Vodacom Cup and Under-21 sides. He is currently their Director of Rugby and Currie Cup head coach.
