= Gerhard Olivier =

South African rugby union player (born 1993)

- Full name: Gerhardus Johannes Olivier
- Born: 17 February 1993 (age 33) Ficksburg, South Africa
- Height: 1.89 m (6 ft 2 1/2 in)
- Weight: 104 kg (16 st 5 lb; 229 lb)
- School: Grey College, Bloemfontein
- University: University of the Free State

Rugby union career
- Position: Flanker / No 8 / Lock
- Current team: Cheetahs / Free State Cheetahs
Youth career
- 2010–2014: Free State Cheetahs
Amateur team(s)
Years	Team	Apps	(Points)
2014–2015	UFS Shimlas	12	(40)
Senior career
Years	Team	Apps	(Points)
2014–2018	Free State XV	21	(15)
2015–present	Free State Cheetahs	23	(25)
2015–2020	Cheetahs	24 (Note: According to the SA Rugby Annual 2019, Olivier featured in the 2018–19 Pro14 match against Munster. However, according to the Pro14 website, he did not make an appearance in the match. This potential appearance has been excluded from Olivier's appearance stats.)	(10)
- Correct as of 21 October 2019

Gerhardus Johannes Olivier (born 17 February 1993) is a South African retired professional rugby union player who last played for the Cheetahs in the Pro14 and the Free State Cheetahs in the Currie Cup. He regularly played as a loose-forward, but was also able to play as a lock.

== Career ==
=== Youth ===
Olivier first represented Bloemfontein-based side Free State at high school level, playing as a lock for them at the Under-18 Craven Week competition held in Welkom in 2010, helping the Free State to a 42–21 victory over their Western Province counterparts in the main match of the competition. He again represented the Free State at the 2011 event held in Kimberley, where they were crowned unofficial champions for the second season in a row, this time beating the Golden Lions in the main match. He was also included in the Free State U19 squad, making three appearances for them in the 2011 Under-19 Provincial Championship.

After finishing high school, Olivier played as a loose forward rather than a lock; he was the starting eighth man in all twelve of the Free State U19's matches during the 2012 Under-19 Provincial Championship, scoring tries in their matches against SWD U19 and Leopards U19. In 2013, his only provincial action came in two appearances for the Free State U21 side during the 2013 Under-21 Provincial Championship, scoring one try in their match against the Border U21s.

=== UFS Shimlas / Free State Cheetahs ===
The following year, Olivier played for UFS Shimlas during the 2014 Varsity Cup. He made four appearances as a number eight during the competition as Shimlas finished fifth on the log to miss out on the semi-finals. After the Varsity Cup, he also became involved with the Free State XV in the 2014 Vodacom Cup competition. He made his first class debut by playing off the bench in a 31–3 victory over the Eastern Province Kings in Cradock. He made his first senior start a week later in a 54–17 win over the Border Bulldogs in Bloemfontein. He again represented the Free State U21 side in 2014, appearing in all thirteen of their matches in the 2014 Under-21 Provincial Championship. He scored a brace of tries in their match against the Border U21s and scored one each in the return leg against Border U21 and against Leopards U21 as Free State finished fourth on the log before losing 17–41 to the Western Province U21s in the semi-final.

Olivier returned to action for the UFS Shimlas in the 2015 Varsity Cup competition, starting eight of their nine matches in the tournament. He scored a try in their 29–29 draw in their first match of the competition, two tries in their 57–0 victory over Bloemfontein rivals CUT Ixias, a hat-trick of tries against two-time winners UCT Ikey Tigers in a 44–24 victory and another two tries in their final match of the round-robin part of the series against the NWU Pukke in a 29–26 win to help Shimlas finish second on the log to qualify for the semi-finals. Olivier played in both their 21–10 win over UCT Ikey Tigers in the semi-final and the final against NWU Pukke, which the Shimlas won 63–33 to win the Varsity Cup for the first time in their history. Despite not scoring in the play-offs, Olivier's eight tries during the competition was still enough to make him the joint-top try scorer with Shimlas teammate Daniel Maartens. Olivier was also selected to represent a Varsity Cup Dream Team, playing off the bench in their one-off match against the South Africa Under-20 team in Stellenbosch.

Olivier returned to Vodacom Cup action for the Free State XV, making three appearances for them during the 2015 Vodacom Cup; he played off the bench in their 29–30 defeat to Western Province and their 18–19 defeat to Cheetahs franchise partners Griquas in Kimberley to finish the season in third spot on the Southern Section log. Olivier made his first start of the competition and scored his first senior try in their quarter-final match against the Blue Bulls in Pretoria, but it wasn't enough to prevent them suffering a 21–44 loss to be eliminated from the competition.

=== Cheetahs ===
After the 2015 Varsity Cup, Shimlas head coach Franco Smith was appointed as the head coach of Super Rugby side the Cheetahs and he included four Shimlas players in his first match in charge against the Waratahs, with Olivier named as a replacement forward for the match.
