= Sias Koen =

South African rugby union player

- Born: 1 January 1994 (age 32) Bloemfontein, South Africa
- Height: 1.90 m (6 ft 3 in)
- Weight: 112 kg (17 st 9 lb; 247 lb)
- School: Hoërskool Klerksdorp

Rugby union career
- Position: Flanker / Number eight / Lock
- Current team: AS Béziers Hérault (on loan from Griquas)
Youth career
- 2007–2013: Leopards
- 2014–2015: Sharks
Senior career
Years	Team	Apps	(Points)
2015	Sharks XV	5	(0)
2016–2019	Griquas	72	(50)
2019–2020	→ Cheetahs	3	(5)
2020–present	→ AS Béziers Hérault	102	(40)
- Correct as of 01 October 2024

Sias Koen (born 1 January 1994) is a South African rugby union player for the AS Béziers Hérault in Pro D2 on loan from Griquas in the Currie Cup and in the Rugby Challenge. He is a utility forward that can play as a flanker, number eight or a lock.

== Rugby career ==
=== 2010–2011 : Schoolboy rugby ===
Koen was born in Bloemfontein, but grew up in the North West province. He went to Hoërskool Klerksdorp and was selected to represent the Leopards at the Under-16 Grant Khomo Week in 2010, scoring tries in their matches against Griquas and Border Country Districts.

In 2011, Koen was named in the Leopards team that competed at the foremost rugby union competition at high school level in South Africa, the Under-18 Craven Week. He again scored two tries during the tournament, both in a 17–40 defeat to Eastern Province Country Districts.

=== 2013 : Leopards Under-19 ===
In 2013, Koen was included in the Leopards U19 squad that participated in the Under-19 Provincial Championship. He started eleven of the team's twelve matches during the regular season, scoring tries in matches against Border U19 and Free State U19 as the team finished on fourth position on the log to qualify for the semi-finals. Koen also started the semi-final against Blue Bulls U21, but the team from Pretoria won 37–21 to end the Leopards' interest in the competition.

=== 2014–2015 : Sharks Under-21 and Vodacom Cup ===
For the 2014 season, Koen moved to Durban to join the Sharks academy. He started nine of the Sharks U21 side's twelve matches in the 2014 Under-21 Provincial Championship, scoring a try against his former side the Leopards in a 55–41 victory and a second in a 106–3 win over Border U21. The Sharks finished in fifth spot, failing to secure a semi-final berth.

At the start of 2015, Koen was included in the Sharks XV squad for the Vodacom Cup competition. He made his first class debut by coming on in the 28th minute of their match against the Border Bulldogs, helping his side to a 53–0 win. After two more appearances as a replacement against Western Province and the Boland Cavaliers, he made his first start in a 24–27 defeat to Griquas in Pietermaritzburg, before reverting to the bench for their final match against the Eastern Province Kings.

Koen made four appearances for the Sharks U21 during the Under-21 Provincial Championship in the latter half of 2015, again scoring a try against his old side the Leopards in a 45–12 win.

=== 2016–present : Griquas ===
In 2016, Koen joined Griquas. He made eleven appearances for the Kimberley-based side during the 2016 Currie Cup qualification, scoring his first senior try in their 36–14 victory over a Sharks XV, as Griquas won eleven of their fourteen matches to finish the competition in second place to earn a spot in the Premier Division of the Currie Cup. He made his debut in the Currie Cup's Premier Division as a replacement in their first match of the season – against former side the Sharks – before making his first start a week later in a 30–24 victory over defending champions the Golden Lions.
