= Johan Kotze =

South African rugby union player

- Full name: Gert Johannes Kotze
- Born: 13 January 1995 (age 31) Upington, South Africa
- Height: 1.77 m (5 ft 9 1/2 in)
- Weight: 107 kg (236 lb; 16 st 12 lb)
- School: Grey College, Bloemfontein
- University: University of the Free State

Rugby union career
- Position: Prop
Youth career
- 2011: Griquas
- 2012–2016: Free State Cheetahs
Senior career
Years	Team	Apps	(Points)
2016	Free State XV	4	(0)
2017–2018	Free State Cheetahs	9	(0)
- Correct as of 22 September 2018

Gert Johannes Kotze (born 13 January 1995) is a South African rugby union player who last played for the Free State Cheetahs in the Currie Cup. His regular position is prop.
