= Jannes Snyman =

South African rugby union player

- Full name: Johannes Hendrik Snyman
- Born: 18 August 1993 (age 33) Johannesburg, South Africa
- Height: 1.76 m (5 ft 9 1/2 in)
- Weight: 100 kg (220 lb; 15 st 10 lb)
- School: Hoërskool Kempton Park
- University: University of Johannesburg

Rugby union career
- Position: Hooker / Flank
- Current team: Falcons
Youth career
- 2012–2014: Golden Lions
Senior career
Years	Team	Apps	(Points)
2016	Golden Lions XV	5	(0)
2018	Free State Cheetahs	4	(0)
2019–present	Falcons	6	(0)
- Correct as of 1 July 2019

Johannes Hendrik 'Buks' Snyman (born 18 August 1993) is a South African rugby union player for the Falcons in the Currie Cup and the Rugby Challenge. His regular position is hooker or flank.
