= Louis Conradie =

South African rugby union player

- Full name: Louis Johannes Conradie
- Born: 11 June 1996 (age 30) Pretoria, South Africa
- Height: 2.04 m (6 ft 8 1/2 in)
- Weight: 120 kg (260 lb; 18 st 13 lb)
- School: Paul Roos Gymnasium, Stellenbosch

Rugby union career
- Position: Lock
- Current team: (United States) Utah Warriors
Youth career
- 2016: (South Africa) Boland Cavaliers
Senior career
Years	Team	Apps	(Points)
2017-2019	(South Africa) Free State XV	3	(0)
2017-2019	(South Africa) Free State Cheetahs	4	(0)
2019	(Singapore) Asia Pacific Dragons	4	(0)
2019	(New Zealand) Otago	9	(0)
2020	(Uruguay) Peñarol	1	(0)
2021	(Japan) NTT Shining Arcs	1	(0)
2021	(South Africa) Blue Bulls	1	(0)
2022–2023	(Japan) Toyota Verblitz	0	(0)
2023	(Israel) Tel Aviv Heat	4	(0)
2024-	(United States) Utah Warriors	0	(0)
- Correct as of 30 January 2024

Louis Johannes Conradie (born 11 June 1996) is a South African rugby union player for Utah Warriors in the MLR. His regular position is lock.
