= Wilmar Arnoldi =

South African rugby union player

- Born: 21 October 1994 (age 32) Pretoria, South Africa
- Height: 1.81 m (5 ft 11 1/2 in)
- Weight: 105 kg (231 lb; 16 st 7 lb)
- School: Hoërskool Ermelo, Ermelo
- University: University of Pretoria

Rugby union career
- Position: Hooker
- Current team: Béziers
Youth career
- 2012: Pumas
- 2013: Blue Bulls
- 2014–2015: Leopards
Senior career
Years	Team	Apps	(Points)
2015	Leopards XV	3	(5)
2015–2016	Leopards	21	(25)
2017–2019	Griquas	29	(35)
2019–2022	Cheetahs	10	(15)
2020–2022	Free State Cheetahs	5	(15)
2022	→ Stormers	1	(0)
2022–	Béziers		
- Correct as of 10 July 2022

Wilmar Arnoldi (born 21 October 1994) is a South African rugby union player for the Cheetahs in the Pro14. His regular position is hooker.
