= Marnus van der Merwe =

South African rugby union player

- Full name: Marthinus Stephanus van der Merwe
- Born: 17 February 1997 (age 29) Nelspruit, South Africa
- Height: 1.86 m (6 ft 1 in)
- Weight: 115 kg (254 lb; 18 st 2 lb)
- School: Hoërskool Nelspruit, Nelspruit

Rugby union career
- Position: Hooker
- Current team: Cheetahs / Free State Cheetahs
Youth career
- 2010–2015: Pumas
- 2016–2018: Free State Cheetahs
Senior career
| Years | Team | Apps | (Points) |
| 2017–2019 | Free State XV | 13 | (25) |
| 2017–2024 | Free State Cheetahs | 26 | (55) |
| 2018–2024 | Cheetahs | 18 | (15) |
| 2024-2026 | Scarlets | 23 | (10) |
| 2026- | Munster | 6 | (5) |
- Correct as of 31 October 2026
International career
| Years | Team | Apps | (Points) |
| 2025-present | South Africa | 3 | (10) |

Marthinus Stephanus van der Merwe (born 17 February 1997) is a South African professional rugby union player who currently plays for Munster in the United Rugby Championship and South Africa. His regular position is hooker.

== Honours ==
South Africa

- 2025 Rugby Championship winner

== Statistics ==
=== Test match record ===
As of 15 September 2025

| Opponent | P | W | D | L | Try | Pts | %Won |
|---|---|---|---|---|---|---|---|
| Australia | 1 | 1 | 0 | 0 | 0 | 0 | 100 |
| Georgia | 1 | 1 | 0 | 0 | 2 | 10 | 100 |
| New Zealand | 1 | 1 | 0 | 0 | 0 | 0 | 100 |
| Total | 3 | 3 | 0 | 0 | 2 | 10 | 100 |

=== International tries ===
As of 15 September 2025

| Try | Opposing team | Location | Venue | Competition | Date | Result | Score |
|---|---|---|---|---|---|---|---|
| 1 | Georgia | Mbombela, South Africa | Mbombela Stadium | 2025 mid-year test | 19 July 2025 | Win | 55–10 |
| 2 | Georgia | Mbombela, South Africa | Mbombela Stadium | 2025 mid-year test | 19 July 2025 | Win | 55–10 |
