= Stephan Malan =

South African rugby union player

- Full name: Johannes Stephan Hendrik Malan
- Born: 24 September 1994 (age 32)

Rugby union career
- Position: Flanker / Lock
- Current team: Lazio
Youth career
- 2014: Griquas
- 2015: Leopards
Senior career
| Years | Team | Apps | (Points) |
| 2015 | Griquas | 6 | (0) |
| 2018 | Free State XV | 6 | (0) |
| 2018 | Free State Cheetahs | 5 | (0) |
| 2018 | Cheetahs | 3 | (0) |
| 2019 | Lazio | 8 | (5) |
- Correct as of 3 November 2018

Johannes Stephan Hendrik Malan (born 24 September 1994) is a South African rugby union player for Lazio in the Top12 in Italy. He played for the Cheetahs in the Pro14, the Free State Cheetahs in the Currie Cup and the Free State XV in the Rugby Challenge in 2018, and for Griquas in 2015. He can play as a loose-forward or a lock.

== Playing career ==
=== Griquas ===
Malan graduated from the Vikings Christian Rugby Academy in Marburg, KwaZulu-Natal and joined Kimberley-based provincial side Griquas during the 2015 season. He was named in the Griquas U21 squad for the 2014 Under-21 Provincial Championship and started all seven of their matches in Group B of the competition. He scored a try in their 21–28 defeat to eventual champions Eastern Province U21 in Round Seven of the competition, helping Griquas to fifth spot on the log, missing out on the play-off places.

Malan was named in the senior Griquas squad for the 2015 Vodacom Cup. He made his first class debut by starting their 37–25 victory over the Border Bulldogs in Hartswater in their third match in the competition. He came on as a replacement in each of their remaining matches in the regular season of the competition, helping Griquas to finish in second spot on the Southern Section log to qualify for the quarter finals. He also played off the bench as they hosted the Pumas in a quarter final match in Kimberley, but could not prevent the team from Mpumalanga winning the match 28–14 to eliminate the defending champions Griquas from the competition.

=== Leopards ===
After the 2015 Vodacom Cup, Malan moved to Potchefstroom to join the Leopards. He played in all twelve of the Leopards U21s' matches in the 2015 Under-21 Provincial Championship Group A, scoring one try in their 31–41 defeat to the Blue Bulls to help Leopards finish in sixth spot on the log.

=== Cheetahs ===
Malan joined the Bloemfontein-based Free State Cheetahs for the 2018 season. He played six matches for the Free State XV during the 2018 Rugby Challenge, five matches for the Free State Cheetahs in the 2018 Currie Cup Premier Division and a further three matches for the Cheetahs franchise in the 2018–19 Pro14 tournament.

=== Lazio ===
In 2019, Malan joined Italian Top12 side Lazio.
