= Ali Mgijima =

South African rugby union player

- Full name: Aliqhayiya Mgijima
- Born: 11 February 1995 (age 31) Adelaide, Eastern Cape, South Africa
- Height: 1.78 m (5 ft 10 in)
- Weight: 97 kg (214 lb; 15 st 4 lb)
- School: HTS Louis Botha, Bloemfontein
- University: Central University of Technology

Rugby union career
- Position: Centre
- Current team: Pumas
Youth career
- 2013–2016: Free State Cheetahs
Amateur team(s)
Years	Team	Apps	(Points)
2015–2017	CUT Ixias	11	(5)
Senior career
Years	Team	Apps	(Points)
2016–2018	Free State XV	23	(20)
2017	Cheetahs	4	(0)
2017–2018	Free State Cheetahs	10	(5)
2020–	Pumas	25	(5)
- Correct as of 10 July 2022

Aliqhayiya Mgijima (born 11 February 1995) is a South African rugby union player for the Cheetahs in the Pro14, the Free State Cheetahs in the Currie Cup and the Free State XV in the Rugby Challenge. His regular position is centre.

== Rugby career ==
=== 2013: Schoolboy rugby ===
Mgijima was born in Adelaide. He moved to Fort Beaufort where he attended primary school before moving to Bloemfontein to attend HTS Louis Botha. In 2013, he was included in the Free State squad that competed at the premier high school rugby union competition, the Under-18 Craven Week held in Polokwane, where he started all three matches in the inside centre position.

=== 2014–2016: Youth and Varsity Cup rugby ===
In 2014, he was included in the Free State U19 squad that participated in the Under-19 Provincial Championship, making three appearances as a replacement in the competition.

He started the 2015 season by featuring in the Varsity Cup for Bloemfontein-based university side CUT Ixias. He started five matches and scored one try in a 13–34 defeat to NMMU Madibaz. In the second half of the year, he made five appearances – which included one start – for the Free State U21s in the Under-21 Provincial Championship.

He made six appearances for CUT Ixias in the 2016 Varsity Cup and was named in the Free State XV squad for the 2016 Currie Cup qualification series. He made his first class debut on 27 May 2016, starting in their 26–29 defeat to the Pumas. In his fifth appearance of the season, at home to the Falcons, Mgijima scored his first senior try, helping his side to a 33–27 victory, eventually making six appearances in the competition. He was a key member of the Free State U21s' 2016 Under-21 Provincial Championship campaign, featuring in all seven of their matches. He scored one try for the team, scoring their first try of the season in a 43–26 victory over the Leopards U21s as the team finished in fourth place on the log to qualify for the semi-finals. However, he couldn't prevent them slipping to a 23–26 defeat to Western Province U21 in the semi-final, a result which saw them eliminated from the competition.

=== 2017: Super Rugby ===
During the 2017 Super Rugby season, Mgijima was named on the bench for the Cheetahs for their Round Three match against Japanese side the Sunwolves, and made his Super Rugby debut by replacing Clinton Swart in the 56th minute of the match.
