= Erich de Jager =

South African rugby union player

- Full name: Erich Estiaan de Jager
- Born: 29 February 1996 (age 30) Port Elizabeth, South Africa
- Height: 1.86 m (6 ft 1 in)
- Weight: 119 kg (262 lb; 18 st 10 lb)
- School: Hoërskool Brandwag
- University: University of the Free State

Rugby union career
- Position: Prop
- Current team: New England Free Jacks
Youth career
- 2009–2014: Eastern Province Kings
- 2015–2017: Free State Cheetahs
- 2016: → Griffons
Senior career
Years	Team	Apps	(Points)
2016–2020	Free State XV	24	(5)
2017–2020	Free State Cheetahs	9	(0)
2018–2020	Cheetahs	10	(0)
2019–2020	→ Griffons	5	(0)
2021–	New England Free Jacks	16	(10)
2021	Griquas	6	(0)
- Correct as of 27 December 2021

Erich Estiaan de Jager (born 29 February 1996) is a South African professional rugby union player for the New England Free Jacks of Major League Rugby (MLR). His regular position is prop. His nickname is "Tarzan" started by his teammates.

He previously played for the Griffons in the Currie Cup.

== Rugby career ==
=== Youth rugby ===
De Jager was born in Port Elizabeth and represented the local Eastern Province Kings at various youth levels during his school career, playing at the Under-18 Craven Week tournaments on two occasions – at the 2013 tournament held in Polokwane and the 2014 event held in Middelburg.

After school, De Jager moved to Bloemfontein, where he joined the Free State Cheetahs academy, playing for them at Under-19 level in 2015, and at Under-21 level in 2016 and 2017. He also made a few appearances for the Griffons U20 team in 2016.

=== First class rugby ===
In 2016, he was included in the Free State XV squad for the 2016 Currie Cup qualification series, and he made his first class debut by coming on as a replacement in their match against the Falcons in their Round Thirteen clash and making a total of four appearances for the team.

After playing a further eight matches for the Free State XV in the 2017 Rugby Challenge, De Jager was included in their squad for the 2017 Currie Cup Premier Division, and made his Currie Cup debut in their 45–34 victory over the Pumas in their Round Three match, one of four appearances in the competition.

He was included in the Cheetahs squad for the 2017–18 Pro14 and – after being an unused replacement in their match against Welsh side the Ospreys – made his Pro14 debut in their match against fellow Welsh side the Dragons in Newport, and his home debut in their next match against the Cardiff Blues.Report

He scored his first try in first class rugby in the 2018 Rugby Challenge, in a 33–19 victory for the Free State XV over their neighbours the Griffons.

In 2020, de Jager signed with the New England Free Jacks of Major League Rugby through to the 2022 season.
