= Reinach Venter =

South African rugby union player

- Full name: Reinach Venter
- Born: 3 January 1995 (age 31) Pretoria, South Africa
- Height: 1.76 m (5 ft 9 1/2 in)
- Weight: 112 kg (247 lb; 17 st 9 lb)
- School: Hoërskool Waterkloof
- University: University of the Free State

Rugby union career
- Position: Hooker
- Current team: Albi
Youth career
- 2011–2013: Blue Bulls
- 2014–2016: Free State Cheetahs
Senior career
| Years | Team | Apps | (Points) |
| 2016–2018 | Free State XV | 10 | (5) |
| 2017 | → Griffons | 3 | (0) |
| 2017–2021 | Cheetahs | 22 | (15) |
| 2017–2021 | Free State Cheetahs | 18 | (10) |
| 2020–2021 | Clermont | 3 | (0) |
| 2021 | Western Province | 1 | (0) |
| 2021– | Albi | | |
- Correct as of 8 September 2021

Reinach Venter (born 3 January 1995) is a South African rugby union player for Clermont Auvergne in the Top 14. His regular position is hooker.

== Rugby career ==
Venter was born in Pretoria. He represented the Blue Bulls at high school level from 2011 to 2013, before moving to Bloemfontein to join the Free State Cheetahs after school. He came through their youth system, representing them at Under-19 and Under-21 level, and made his first class debut for the Free State XV in the 2016 Currie Cup qualification series against the Border Bulldogs.

After a short spell with the Welkom-based Griffons, where he made three appearances in the 2017 Rugby Challenge, he made his Super Rugby debut, coming on as a replacement in the Cheetahs' final match of the 2017 Super Rugby season against the Kings. His Currie Cup debut followed the very next week, coming on as a replacement in their opening match in the 2017 Currie Cup Premier Division against the Sharks, also scoring his first senior try in the same match in a 47–12 victory. He made a further six appearances in the competition, scoring another try in their match against the Pumas.
