= Lloyd Greeff =

South African rugby union player

- Full name: Lloyd Dirk Greeff
- Born: 3 January 1994 (age 32) Vanderbijlpark, South Africa
- Height: 1.94 m (6 ft 4 1/2 in)
- Weight: 110 kg (17 st 5 lb; 243 lb)
- School: Hoërskool Transvalia
- University: North-West University

Rugby union career
- Position: Winger / Centre
- Current team: Cheetahs / Free State Cheetahs / Free State XV
Youth career
- 2010–2012: Falcons
- 2013: Leopards
- 2014–2015: Golden Lions
Amateur team(s)
Years	Team	Apps	(Points)
2014	NWU Pukke	0	(0)
Senior career
Years	Team	Apps	(Points)
2016	Golden Lions XV	1	(0)
2016–2017	Zebre	15	(10)
2017−2018	Free State Cheetahs	6	(10)
2018	Cheetahs	2	(0)
2018	Free State XV	4	(2)
- Correct as of 22 September 2018
International career
Years	Team	Apps	(Points)
2014	South Africa Under-20	3	(15)
- Correct as of 22 April 2018

Lloyd Dirk Greeff (born 3 January 1994) is a South African rugby union player who last played for the Cheetahs in the Pro14, the Free State Cheetahs in the Currie Cup and the Free State XV in the Rugby Challenge. He can play as a winger or a centre.

== Rugby career ==
=== Youth / Golden Lions ===
Greeff was born in Vanderbijlpark. After representing the Falcons and Leopards at youth level, he was included in the South Africa Under-20 that competed at the 2014 IRB Junior World Championship in New Zealand. He scored two tries in their 61–5 victory over Scotland, another in a 33–24 victory over the hosts and also played in their semi-final victory over New Zealand.

He joined the Johannesburg-based Golden Lions, but suffered a knee injury that ruled him out of action for the majority of his Lions career. He made just a single senior appearance for the team, as a late replacement in a 35–all draw against the Eastern Province Kings in the 2016 Currie Cup qualification series.

=== Zebre ===
Greeff moved to Italy to join Pro12 side Zebre before the 2016–2017 season.
