= Walt Steenkamp =

South African rugby union player

- Born: 21 July 1995 (age 31) Rustenburg, South Africa
- Height: 2.03 m (6 ft 8 in)
- Weight: 121 kg (267 lb; 19 st 1 lb)
- School: Hoërskool Rustenburg
- University: North-West University

Rugby union career
- Position: Lock
- Current team: Mitsubishi Dynaboars
Youth career
- 2014–2015: Leopards
Senior career
Years	Team	Apps	(Points)
2015–2018	Leopards	39	(5)
2018–2020	Cheetahs	35	(10)
2019	Free State Cheetahs	8	(10)
2020–2022	Bulls	28	(10)
2020–2022	Blue Bulls	18	(10)
2022–	Mitsubishi Dynaboars	45	(55)

Walt Steenkamp (born 21 July 1995) is a South African professional rugby union player for the Mitsubishi Sagamihara DynaBoars in the new upcoming Japan Rugby League One. His regular position is lock.

== Career ==
In 2016 Steenkamp made his mark in the FNB Varsity Cup for the NWU-Pukke. He was instrumental in clinching the 2016 Varsity Cup against the FNB Maties in overtime. In 2018, he was awarded the Player that Rocks award. After his varsity career he moved on to the Currie Cup First Division, where he made a massive impact for the Leopards.

In 2018, Steenkamp made the move to the Free State Cheetahs, where he continued to impress in the Pro14.

== Honours ==
- Pro14 Rainbow Cup runner-up 2021
- United Rugby Championship runner-up 2021-22
