= Nico Lee =

South African rugby union player

- Full name: Nicolaas Jacobus Lee
- Born: 13 March 1994 (age 32) Pretoria, South Africa
- Height: 1.80 m (5 ft 11 in)
- Weight: 89 kg (14 st 0 lb; 196 lb)
- School: Afrikaanse Hoër Seunskool, Pretoria
- University: University of the Free State

Rugby union career
- Position: Centre
- Current team: Brive
Youth career
- 2013–2015: Free State Cheetahs
Amateur team(s)
| Years | Team | Apps | (Points) |
| 2015–2016 | UFS Shimlas | 9 | (15) |
Senior career
| Years | Team | Apps | (Points) |
| 2014–2015 | Free State XV | 12 | (30) |
| 2016–2019 | Cheetahs | 43 | (45) |
| 2016–2019 | Free State Cheetahs | 12 | (20) |
| 2019- | CA Brive | 5 | ((5)) |
- Correct as of 21 July 2019

Nicolaas Jacobus Lee (born 13 March 1994 in Pretoria, South Africa) is a South African rugby union player for French Top 14 side Brive. His regular position is centre.

== Youth ==
Lee played schoolboy rugby for Afrikaanse Hoër Seunskool in Pretoria, but missed out on selection for the Blue Bulls' squad for the Craven Week competition in 2012.

In 2013, Lee moved to Bloemfontein where he represented the Free State U19 side in the 2013 Under-21 Provincial Championship competition, making eleven starts during the season, scoring four tries and a penalty during the campaign.

== Free State Cheetahs ==
He was included in the Free State XV squad for the 2014 Vodacom Cup competition. He made his first class debut in their round one match against SWD Eagles and marked the occasion by scoring a 55th minute try in a 52–47 victory. He remained a regular in a side for the duration of the competition, starting in all eight of their matches. He scored a total of six tries during the season, making him the Free State XV's joint top try scorer (along with Zingisa April).

In July 2014, Lee signed a new contract with the Free State Cheetahs until the end of 2017.
