= Tapiwa Mafura =

Zimbabwean rugby union player (born 1996)

- Full name: Tapiwa Lloyd Mafura
- Born: 11 April 1996 (age 30) Hwange, Zimbabwe
- Height: 1.75 m (5 ft 9 in)
- Weight: 76 kg (168 lb)
- School: Hoërskool Ermelo
- University: North-West University

Rugby union career
- Position: Fullback
- Current team: Lions / Golden Lions
Amateur team(s)
Years	Team	Apps	(Points)
2017–2018	NWU Pukke		
Senior career
Years	Team	Apps	(Points)
2017–2018	Leopards	26	(30)
2019	Free State XV	6	(30)
2019	Free State Cheetahs	1	(0)
2019–2020	Cheetahs	0	(0)
2020–2022	Pumas	27	(25)
2022–2024	Cheetahs	10	(5)
2023–	Free State Cheetahs	14	(30)
2024–2026	Lions	10	(10)
2024–2026	Golden Lions	12	(20)
- Correct as of 29 September 2025
International career
Years	Team	Apps	(Points)
2021–	Zimbabwe	17	(24)
- Correct as of 19 July 2025

Tapiwa Lloyd Mafura (born 11 April 1996 in Hwange) is a Zimbabwean rugby union player who plays as fullback or wing for the Golden Lions in the Currie Cup and the Lions in the United Rugby Championship.

Mafura made his Currie Cup debut for the Free State Cheetahs in their match in Round Four of the 2019 Currie Cup against the Golden Lions.
