= Darren Adonis =

South African rugby union player

- Full name: Darren Lance Adonis
- Born: 13 September 1998 (age 28) Cape Town, South Africa
- Height: 1.70 m (5 ft 7 in)
- Weight: 84 kg (185 lb; 13 st 3 lb)
- School: Hoër Landbouskool Oakdale
- University: Central University of Technology

Rugby union career
- Position: Fullback / Wing
- Current team: Cheetahs / Free State Cheetahs / Free State XV
Youth career
- 2011–2016: SWD Eagles
Amateur team(s)
Years	Team	Apps	(Points)
2017	CUT Ixias		
Senior career
Years	Team	Apps	(Points)
2018–present	Free State XV	15	(20)
2018–present	Cheetahs	3	(0)
2019–present	Free State Cheetahs	6	(10)
- Correct as of 8 September 2019
International career
Years	Team	Apps	(Points)
2022-	South Africa Sevens		

Darren Lance Adonis (born 13 September 1998) is a South African rugby union player for the Cheetahs in the Pro14, the Free State Cheetahs in the Currie Cup and the Free State XV in the Rugby Challenge. His regular position is fullback or wing.

== International career ==
In December 2022, he was called to the South African Sevens Rugby Team to compete in the World Rugby Sevens Series in the Cape Town Tournament.
