= Tertius Kruger =

South African rugby union player (born 1993)

- Born: 9 August 1993 (age 33) Randfontein, South Africa
- Height: 1.79 m (5 ft 10 1/2 in)
- Weight: 90 kg (14 st 2 lb; 198 lb)
- School: Hoërskool Outeniqua, George / Oudtshoorn High School, Oudtshoorn
- University: MBW
- Notable relative: De Wet Kruger (brother)

Rugby union career
- Position: Centre
- Current team: Griquas
Youth career
- 2006–2011: SWD Eagles
- 2012: Free State U19
- 2013–2014: Free State U21
Amateur team(s)
Years	Team	Apps	(Points)
2014–2015	UFS Shimlas	11	(5)
Senior career
Years	Team	Apps	(Points)
2015–2016	Free State Cheetahs	2	(0)
2016	Free State XV	12	(20)
2016	Griffons	7	(10)
2017	Griquas	22	(60)
2017–2018	Cheetahs	2	(0)
2018	Free State XV	4	(30)
2018	Free State Cheetahs	4	(0)
2018–2020	Southern Kings	17	(15)
2020–2022	HKU Sandy Bay		
2023–	Griquas		
- Correct as of 4 May 2019

Tertius Kruger (born 9 August 1993) is a South African professional rugby union player for the Southern Kings in the Pro14. His regular position is centre.

== Career ==
=== SWD Eagles ===
Kruger was involved in provincial rugby since primary school level, representing the SWD Eagles at the Under-13 Craven Week competition in 2006. He was also selected to represent the SWD Eagles at Under-16 level, playing at the Grant Khomo Week in 2009, and at Under-18 level, playing at South Africa's premier high school rugby union tournament, the Craven Week, in 2011.

=== Free State / UFS Shimlas ===
After high school, Kruger moved to Bloemfontein to join the Free State Cheetahs. He made seven starts for the Free State U19 team during the 2012 Under-19 Provincial Championship, scoring tries in their matches against the Leopards U19 and the Golden Lions U19. Free State lost out on a semi-final spot in the competition, however, finishing in sixth spot.

In 2013, he made the step up to Under-21 level and played in ten of the Free State U21 team's matches during the 2013 Under-21 Provincial Championship. He again scored two tries – against eventual champions Western Province U21 in an 18–16 victory in the opening match of their season and against Sharks U21 – as his side once again missed out on the semi-finals by finishing fifth.

Kruger started the 2014 season by representing university side UFS Shimlas in the 2014 Varsity Cup. He made four appearances and scored against UJ in a 52–13 win as UFS Shimlas finished the competition in fifth spot. He started nine matches for Free State U21 in the 2014 Under-21 Provincial Championship and scored tries against Western Province U21 and in both of their matches against the Leopards. His side finished fourth to qualify for the semi-final, where they were beaten by Western Province.

Kruger started seven of the UFS Shimlas' matches during the 2015 Varsity Cup competition, helping Shimlas finish top of the log and qualify for a home semi-final. He featured in their semi-final match against two-time champions UCT Ikey Tigers where Shimlas secured a 21–10 victory to help them qualify for their first ever final. He also started the final against the NWU Pukke as Shimlas ran out comfortable 63–33 winners to win their first ever Varsity Cup title.

=== Free State Cheetahs ===
Kruger was included in the Free State Cheetahs senior squad for the first time for the 2015 Currie Cup Premier Division and was initially named on the bench for their Round Two match against Western Province, but subsequently replaced by loose-forward Tienie Burger. He was again named on the bench for their Round Four match against the same opposition, but failed to make an appearance. He eventually made his first class debut on 19 September 2015 as he played off the bench in the Free State Cheetahs' 44–24 victory over Griquas. He made his first start a week later in their 31–73 defeat to the Golden Lions.

=== Southern Kings ===
Kruger moved to Port Elizabeth to join the Southern Kings after the 2018 Currie Cup Premier Division.

== Personal life ==
Kruger is the younger brother of number eight De Wet Kruger. They both played for the Free State Cheetahs in the 2015 Currie Cup; Tertius made his first class debut one week before De Wet and the two brothers featured in a match together when De Wet made his debut in their defeat to the Golden Lions.
