= Sibabalo Qoma =

South African rugby union player

- Born: 17 February 1997 (age 29) East London, South Africa
- Height: 1.92 m (6 ft 3 1/2 in)
- Weight: 106 kg (234 lb; 16 st 10 lb)
- School: Hudson Park High School, East London and Westville Boys' High School, Durban

Rugby union career
- Position: Flanker
- Current team: Lions / Golden Lions
Youth career
- 2013: Border
- 2014–2015: Sharks
- 2016–2018: Free State Cheetahs
Senior career
Years	Team	Apps	(Points)
2017–2019	Free State XV	20	(0)
2017	Free State Cheetahs	2	(0)
2019	→ Griffons	9	(0)
2020–2022	Griquas	24	(10)
2022–2024	Cheetahs	8	(10)
2023–2024	Free State Cheetahs	12	(25)
2024–	Golden Lions	16	(15)
2024–	Lions	23	(5)
- Correct as of 3 November 2026

Sibabalo 'Fudge' Qoma (born 17 February 1997) is a South African rugby union player for the Lions.

Sibabalo started his rugby career in high school where he was scouted to move to Westville Boys High School, attending Craven Week for the Sharks in 2015. He then moved on to the Free State Cheetahs while studying at the University of the Free State.

Sibabalo played Varsity Cup for the Shimlas and also made a few appearances for the Cheeatahs Curry Cup team during this stint. He was loaned out to the Griffons for a period and landed his first professional contract at the Griquas in 2020.

Sibabalo had two successful seasons at the Griquas, helping them to the Currie Cup final in 2022. He then moved to the Cheetahs in 2023, winning his first Currie Cup against the Pumas.

Sibabalo moved up to the Lions in 2024.
