= Corniel van Zyl =

- Full name: Casparus Cornelius van Zyl
- Born: 27 January 1979 (age 47) Nelspruit, South Africa
- Height: 2.00 m (6 ft 7 in)
- Weight: 110 kg (17 st 5 lb; 243 lb)

Rugby union career
- Position: Lock
Senior career
Years	Team	Apps	(Points)
2003–2004	Pumas	25	(10)
2003–2004	→ Rotherham Titans	4	(5)
2005–2007	Free State Cheetahs	48	(25)
2005	Cats	0	(0)
2006–2015	Cheetahs	24	(0)
2007–2015	Treviso	160	(35)
- Correct as of 30 January 2021
International career
Years	Team	Apps	(Points)
2011–2012	Italy	8	(0)
- Correct as of 30 January 2021
Coaching career
- Years: Team
- 2015–2020: Free State Cheetahs (forwards coach)
- 2021–2023: London Irish (assistant coach)
- 2023–2025: Benetton Treviso (assistant coach)
- 2025–: Cardiff Rugby (head coach)

Casparus Cornelius "Corniel" van Zyl (born 27 January 1979) is a South African-born Italian former rugby union footballer who played at lock. Van Zyl was part of the Italian squad at the 2011 Rugby World Cup. He is currently head coach at Cardiff Rugby.

He played for Italian side Treviso for eight seasons from 2007 to 2015 before retiring as a player to become the forwards coach at the Free State Cheetahs.

Van Zyl left the Free State Cheetahs in 2020 and joined London Irish as an assistant coach on 30 January 2021.
