= Charles Marais =

South African rugby union player

- Full name: Charles Maclean Marais
- Born: 29 August 1988 (age 38) Paarl, South Africa
- Height: 1.91 m (6 ft 3 in)
- Weight: 120 kg (18 st 13 lb; 265 lb)
- School: Paarl Boys' High School
- University: University of the Free State

Rugby union career
- Position: Prop
Youth career
- 2007: Free State Cheetahs
Amateur team(s)
Years	Team	Apps	(Points)
2009–2013	UFS Shimlas	26	(15)
Senior career
Years	Team	Apps	(Points)
2010–2011	Free State Cheetahs	7	(0)
2012–2013	Free State XV	8	(0)
2012–2013	→ Griffons	6	(5)
2014	Golden Lions XV	10	(0)
2014	Lions	1	(0)
2014–2015	Eastern Province Kings	7	(0)
2016–2020	Cheetahs	76	(2)
2016–2021	Free State Cheetahs	21	(10)
- Correct as of 14 April 2021

Charles Maclean Marais (born 29 August 1988) was a South African rugby union professional player for the Cheetahs in the Pro14 and the Free State Cheetahs in the Currie Cup. His regular position is prop.

== Career ==
=== Youth and Varsity rugby ===
Despite not representing Western Province at secondary school level while a scholar at Paarl Boys' High School, Marais were included in the Free State U19 squad for the 2007 Under-19 Provincial Championship after he moved to Bloemfontein to enroll at the University of the Free State. He also represented his university side in the Varsity Cup competition, playing for them in five consecutive seasons between 2009 and 2013, amassing 26 appearances and scoring three tries.

=== Free State Cheetahs ===
His first class debut came during the 2010 Vodacom Cup competition. He missed the early rounds of the competition due to his involvement in the 2010 Varsity Cup competition, but made his debut by starting in their Round 6 loss against Argentinean invitational side the Pampas XV in Parow, Cape Town. He remained in the starting line-up for the remainder of the competition and helped the Free State XV reach the final, where they lost 31–29 to the Blue Bulls. He remained involved in the Free State's Vodacom Cup campaigns in 2011, 2012 and 2013, making a total of fifteen appearances. However, he was never included in a Currie Cup squad during his time in Bloemfontein.

=== Griffons ===
His lack of involvement in Currie Cup action for the Free State Cheetahs saw Marais have two short spells at near-neighbours the Griffons. He made his Currie Cup debut for them during the 2012 Currie Cup First Division in their match against the Falcons, marking the occasion by scoring his first ever senior try early in the second half. He made five appearances in the competition for the Welkom-based side and returned for one match in 2013, coming on as a substitute against the Pumas in Nelspruit.

=== Golden Lions / Lions ===
Marais moved to Johannesburg to join the Golden Lions for the 2014 season. He was a regular in their squad for the 2014 Vodacom Cup competition, playing in all ten of their matches during the competition, starting eight of those. He was once again involved in a Vodacom Cup final, but once again ended up on the losing side, as the Golden Lions lost 30–6 to Griquas in Kimberley.

Marais also made his Super Rugby debut during the 2014 season, coming on as a substitute in their match against the Bulls after being a late inclusion on the bench following Julian Redelinghuys' withdrawal through injury.

=== Eastern Province Kings ===
In July 2014, it was announced that Marais would join the Eastern Province Kings prior to the 2014 Currie Cup Premier Division competition. He signed a deal that would see him play for the Port Elizabeth-based side until the end of 2016.
