= Ryno Eksteen =

South African rugby union player

- Full name: Ryno Eksteen
- Born: 3 October 1994 (age 32) Centurion, South Africa
- Height: 1.86 m (6 ft 1 in)
- Weight: 88 kg (13 st 12 lb; 194 lb)
- School: Afrikaanse Hoër Seunskool, Pretoria

Rugby union career
- Position: Fly-half / Full-back
Youth career
- 2010–2012: Blue Bulls
- 2015: Western Province
Senior career
Years	Team	Apps	(Points)
2014	Stormers	1	(0)
2015	Western Province	2	(0)
2017–2018	Free State XV	9	(0)
2017	Free State Cheetahs	4	(21)
2018	Cheetahs	3	(0)
2020	Seattle Seawolves	1	(0)
2020	Stormers	1	(0)
- Correct as of 29 April 2021
International career
Years	Team	Apps	(Points)
2012	South Africa Schools	3	(0)
- Correct as of 22 April 2018

Ryno Eksteen (born 3 October 1994 in Centurion) is a former South African rugby union player for the Seattle Seawolves in Major League Rugby. He previously played for the Free State Cheetahs in the Currie Cup and the Free State XV in the Rugby Challenge. His regular position is fly-half or full-back.

== Career ==
Eksteen represented the Blue Bulls in the 2010 Under-16 Grant Khomo Week competition and in the 2012 Under-18 Craven Week tournament, where he was top points scorer for the tournament and helped the Blue Bulls win the unofficial final against the Golden Lions. His performance saw him called up to the 2012 South African Schools side that played against France, Wales and England in August 2012.

He joined the Western Province Rugby Institute for the 2013 season – moving in the opposite direction to Western Province's Craven Week and fellow S.A. Schools fly-half Handré Pollard, who joined the Blue Bulls. However, a knee injury ruled him out of action for the 2013 season.

== Stormers ==
He was included in the pre-season training squad for the Stormers prior to the 2014 Super Rugby season and also made the final Stormers squad.

He made his Super Rugby debut in the opening match of the season, a 34–10 loss to the Lions. Incredibly, he played Super Rugby without making any appearances in the South African domestic Currie Cup and Vodacom Cup competitions, or even playing at Under-21 or Under-19 level for Western Province.
