= Shaun Venter =

South African rugby union player

- Full name: Shaun Harold Venter
- Born: 16 March 1987 (age 39) Witbank, South Africa
- Height: 1.85 m (6 ft 1 in)
- Weight: 86 kg (190 lb; 13 st 8 lb)
- School: Afrikaanse Hoër Seunskool

Rugby union career
- Position: Scrum-half
- Current team: RODEZ RUGBY
Youth career
- 2006: Pumas
Senior career
Years	Team	Apps	(Points)
2007–2013	Pumas	105	(140)
2013	Southern Kings	18	(10)
2014–2019	Cheetahs	82	(70)
2014–2019	Free State Cheetahs	37	(60)
2015	Free State XV	5	(10)
2019-2021	Ospreys	23	(17)
2021-2022	Bayonne	26	(10)
2022-2024	US Montauban	15	(30)
2024-Present	Rodez Rugby		
- Correct as of 24 May 2023
International career
Years	Team	Apps	(Points)
2009	South Africa Sevens		
2012	South African Barbarians (North)	1	(10)
- Correct as of 22 April 2018

Shaun Harold Venter (born 16 March 1987 in Witbank) is a South African rugby union player for Rodez Rugby in the French Rugby FEDERALE 3 He is a utility back, having started matches at full-back, centre, winger and scrum-half, but since 2011 he has been predominantly used as a scrum-half.

== Career ==
=== Pumas ===
He started his career playing for the Pumas, making more than a hundred appearances for them between 2007 and 2013. After playing for them at Under-19 and Under-21 level, he made his debut in the 2007 Vodacom Cup competition.

=== Kings ===
He joined the Southern Kings for the 2013 Super Rugby season on a loan deal from the Pumas. He immediately established himself as the starting scrum-half for the Kings, making his Super Rugby debut in the first ever Super Rugby match, a 22–10 victory against the Force. He played in all sixteen of the Kings' matches that season, thirteen starts and three appearances as a substitute. He scored an early try in their match against the Rebels in Melbourne to help them to a 30–27 victory and also scored the fourth try in their home match against the Highlanders, which meant the Kings achieved their first victory in the competition with an added try bonus point. He also played in both 2013 Super Rugby promotion/relegation matches against the Lions, failing to help the Kings retain their Super Rugby status.

=== Cheetahs ===
He signed a two-year contract with the Cheetahs from 1 November 2013. He was included in the Cheetahs squad for the 2014 Super Rugby season and made his debut in a 21–20 defeat to the Lions in Bloemfontein.

=== Ospreys ===
He has signed a 2-year contract with Ospreys until the end of the 2020–21 Pro14 season.

=== Bayonne ===
On 13 July 2021, Venter travels to France as he signs for Bayonne in the second-tier Pro D2 from the 2021–22 season.
