= Carel-Jan Coetzee =

South African rugby union player

- Full name: Carel-Jan Wynand Coetzee
- Born: 23 January 1995 (age 31) Bloemfontein, South Africa
- Height: 1.83 m (6 ft 0 in)
- Weight: 92 kg (203 lb; 14 st 7 lb)
- School: Hoërskool Jim Fouché
- University: University of the Free State

Rugby union career
- Position: Centre
- Current team: Griffons
Youth career
- 2013–2015: Free State Cheetahs
Senior career
Years	Team	Apps	(Points)
2016	Free State XV	8	(5)
2017	Griffons	4	(10)
2017–2020	Free State Cheetahs	7	(15)
2018–2019	Free State XV	8	(30)
2019–2020	Cheetahs	1	(0)
2022–	Griffons	1	(0)
- Correct as of 9 April 2022

Carel-Jan Wynand Coetzee (born 23 January 1995) is a South African rugby union player for the Cheetahs in the Pro14, the Free State Cheetahs in the Currie Cup and the Free State XV in the Rugby Challenge. His regular position is centre.
