= Daniel Maartens =

South African rugby union player

- Full name: Daniel Johannes Maartens
- Born: 4 May 1995 (age 31) Nelspruit, South Africa
- Height: 1.79 m (5 ft 10 1/2 in)
- Weight: 90 kg (200 lb; 14 st 2 lb)
- School: Hoërskool Nelspruit
- University: University of the Free State

Rugby union career
- Position: Flank
- Current team: Cheetahs / Free State Cheetahs
Youth career
- 2008–2013: Pumas
- 2014–2016: Free State Cheetahs
Senior career
Years	Team	Apps	(Points)
2017–2019	Free State XV	17	(15)
2017–2018	Free State Cheetahs	8	(20)
2017–2020	Cheetahs	11	(15)
2020–2022	Pumas	26	(30)
2022–	Cheetahs		
2023–	Free State Cheetahs		
- Correct as of 10 July 2022

Daniel Johannes Maartens (born 4 May 1995) is a South African rugby union player for the Cheetahs in the Pro14, the Free State Cheetahs in the Currie Cup and the Free State XV in the Rugby Challenge. He regularly plays as a flank.
