= Aidon Davis =

South African rugby union player

- Born: 29 April 1994 (age 32) Uitenhage, South Africa
- Height: 1.91 m (6 ft 3 in)
- Weight: 110 kg (240 lb; 17 st 5 lb)
- School: HTS Daniel Pienaar
- Notable relative: Dalton Davis

Rugby union career
- Position: Loose forward
- Current team: Exeter Chiefs
Youth career
- 2007–2015: Eastern Province Kings
Senior career
| Years | Team | Apps | (Points) |
| 2013–2015 | Eastern Province Kings | 19 | (30) |
| 2013–2016 | Southern Kings | 10 | (0) |
| 2016–2017 | Toulon | 4 | (0) |
| 2017–2018 | Bayonne | 22 | (20) |
| 2018–2022 | Free State Cheetahs | 23 | (5) |
| 2018–2022 | Cheetahs | 50 | (5) |
| 2022– | Exeter Chiefs | 25 | (15) |
- Correct as of 8 September 2021
International career
| Years | Team | Apps | (Points) |
| 2012 | South Africa Schools | 1 | (0) |
| 2013–2014 | South Africa Under-20 | 8 | (10) |
- Correct as of 26 March 2015

Aidon Davis (born 29 April 1994) is a South African rugby union player for Exeter Chiefs in England's Premiership Rugby. He previously played for the Cheetahs in the Pro14 and the Free State Cheetahs in the Currie Cup. His regular position is flanker or number eight.

== Career ==
=== 2007–2012 : Schools rugby ===
Davis represented Eastern Province as early as primary school level, playing at the Under-13 Craven Week in 2007. He played for them at the Under-16 Grant Khomo Week in 2010 and played for the Eastern Province U19 team in the 2011 Under-19 Provincial Championship despite still being in the Under-17 age group, scoring a try in their match against Boland U19. He played for and captained Eastern Province at the premier high school rugby tournament in South Africa, the Under-18 Craven Week, held in Port Elizabeth in July 2012, where he led by example, scoring tries in their matches against the Falcons and Boland. He was also included in the South African Schools team shortly after the Craven Week concluded, making one start for them in their 36–29 victory over England in Cape Town. He once again played for the Eastern Province U19 in the Under-19 Provincial Championship in 2012, making three appearances and scoring tries in their matches against Griquas U19 and Border U19.

=== 2013–2016 : Eastern Province Kings, Southern Kings and South Africa Under-20 ===
In 2013, Davis joined the Eastern Province Academy. He was included in the Eastern Province Kings' Vodacom Cup squad and made his first class debut by coming on as a replacement in a 20-all draw against Argentine invitational side Pampas XV in Port Elizabeth. He made another two appearances in the competition; he played off the bench in a 30–22 win over Eastern Cape rivals Border Bulldogs and made his first start in senior rugby in their defeat to Western Province.

Davis was then called up to the South Africa Under-20 squad and included for their tour to Argentina in preparation for the 2013 IRB Junior World Championship. He scored a try in South Africa's first match against Argentina and was included in the final squad for the IRB Junior World Championship in France. He came on as a replacement in their 97–0 victory over the United States in their first match in Pool A. He was an unused replacement in their 31–24 win over England, but played off the bench early on in their final pool match against hosts France, helping them to a 26–19 victory to finish top of their group and to qualify for the semi-finals. He was an unused replacement in their 17–18 defeat to Wales in the semi-finals, but made his first start for the side in their third-place play-off match against New Zealand, which ended in a 41–34 victory for South Africa.

Shortly after Davis' return to South Africa, he made his Currie Cup debut for the Eastern Province Kings. He played off the bench in their 13–29 defeat to the Pumas in their opening match of the 2013 Currie Cup First Division competition. He was promoted to the starting line-up for their next match against the Griffons and scored his first senior try in the match, opening his side's scoring in the seventh minute of a 37–21 victory. The following week, Davis made his Super Rugby debut when he was substituted onto the field shortly before the hour mark in Southern Kings' final match of the 2013 Super Rugby season against the Sharks in Durban, with the hosts easily winning the match 58–13. He reverted to the Currie Cup side to score what proved to be a crucial try in a 35–34 victory over the SWD Eagles the following week and made one more start in their 23–30 defeat to the Boland Cavaliers. He reverted to youth rugby for the remainder of the season, starting in all nine of the Eastern Province U21 side's matches in the 2013 Under-21 Provincial Championship. The team won all seven of their matches during the regular season, with Davis scoring tries in their matches against Pumas U21, Griffons U21, Griquas U21, Boland U21 and Limpopo Blue Bulls U21. He started in their 44–26 win over Griquas U21 in the semi-final, and in the final a week later, where a 59–19 victory saw Eastern Province U21 being crowned champions of Group B of the competition. He didn't play in their promotion play-off match against Eastern Cape rivals Border U21, and the side fell short, losing 21–23 to remain in Group B of the competition.

As in 2013, Davis started the 2014 season by playing in the Vodacom Cup competition. He made five appearances as the Eastern Province Kings finished in fifth position on the Southern Section log, missing out on a play-off position. For the second season in succession, Davis was included in the South Africa Under-20 side that competed at the IRB Junior World Championship in New Zealand, also being named one of two vice-captains for the tournament. He was the first-choice number eight for the team, starting all five of their matches in that position. Davis scored one of nine tries in South Africa's 61–5 win over Scotland in their opening match before helping them to a 33–24 victory over hosts and four-time winners New Zealand in their second match. He was again on the scoresheet in their final pool match, with a 21–8 victory over Samoa ensuring they would finish top of Pool C to qualify for the semi-finals. Davis started the semi-final as they against beat New Zealand, this time by a 32–25 scoreline, as well as the final, where South Africa fell just short, losing 20–21 to England to finish as runners-up in the competition.

Davis returned to South Africa to make four appearances for an Eastern Province Kings side that were promoted to the Premier Division of the Currie Cup for 2015. He made his debut in the Currie Cup Premier Division as a replacement in a 16–35 defeat to Western Province in the opening round and make his first start a week later, in a match that also saw him score his first try at this level in a 19–60 defeat to the Golden Lions. He made two more starts for the EP Kings (they eventually finished bottom of the log with just a single victory to their name), before again turning out for the Eastern Province U21s in the 2014 Under-21 Provincial Championship. He made just one appearances for them during the regular season – scoring a try in their 28–21 win over Griquas U21 – but featured in the play-offs after seven wins out of seven saw the side qualify. Davis helped them to a 28–26 victory over Limpopo Blue Bulls U21 in the semi-final and scored a try in the final as they beat SWD U21 46–3 to win the competition for the third consecutive season. He also played and scored a try in their promotion play-off match, finally winning promotion to Group A after two unsuccessful attempts in 2012 and 2013, beating Border U21 64–9 in East London.

Davis made three appearances for the Eastern Province Kings during the 2015 Vodacom Cup. The first two were as a replacement, but he started their match against the Boland Cavaliers in Citrusdal and scored a hat-trick of tries to help his side to a 44–10 victory. It wasn't enough to help the side qualify for the quarter-finals, finishing in fifth position in the Southern Section. It was also the last action for Davis in 2015, as he suffered a tears of his posterior and lateral knee ligaments, which required an operation and ruled him out of action for the rest of the year.

In December 2015, Davis was one of the first twenty players that signed contracts to play for the Southern Kings in the 2016 Super Rugby season.

=== 2016-2017 Toulon ===
In June 2016, it was announced that Davis would join Top 14 side Toulon for the 2016–2017 Top 14 season. Davis stepped up in France and quickly transitioned into his new team as he made a few contributions to the Toulon side during their Top 14 tournament. In November 2016, SA Rugby Magazine selected a team made up of South Africans who excelled for their clubs in September and selected Aidon Davis as the eight man.

=== 2017-2018 Bayonne ===
In June 2017, it was announced that Davis would join the French Side Bayonne located in the South-West of France. Davis was a number one pick on either flank or eight man for the French side. In his season at Bayonne he played 22 matches and was largely known for his hard tackles as well as being a primary ball carrier for the team.

=== 2018-2022 Free-State Cheetahs/Cheetahs ===
In April 2018, news quickly spread that The Free State Cheetahs have contracted the former Junior Springbok loose-forward, Aidon Davis. The 23-year-old player represented the Baby Boks at the IRB Junior World Championship in New Zealand, playing in eight games. Davis was named as the vice-captain of the side for the tournament. He left South Africa to play for the French Top14 giants, but has been playing for Bayonne in France for the past season. Davis has also played in the Super Rugby in the past when he represented the Southern Kings before heading Europe. After Davis started his Pro14 Season with the Free State Cheetahs, he was the regular number one pick on eight man and transitioned perfectly back into the South-African ways. Unfortunately Davis was ruled out for the rest of the Pro14 season due to a leg injury. According to the various articles Davis will only be available to play for the Cheetahs side at the start of August 2019.

=== 2022- Exeter Chiefs ===
On 24 March 2022, it was confirmed that Davis moved to England to join Exeter Chiefs in the Premiership Rugby from the 2022-23 season.
