= Kobus van Wyk =

South African rugby union player (born 1992)

- Full name: Jacobus Petrus van Wyk
- Born: 22 January 1992 (age 34) Nababeep, South Africa
- Height: 190 cm (6 ft 3 in)
- Weight: 98 kg (216 lb; 15 st 6 lb)
- School: Paarl Gimnasium

Rugby union career
- Position: Wing
- Current team: Zebre Parma
Senior career
Years	Team	Apps	(Points)
2013–2016	Western Province	25	(45)
2014–2016	Stormers	30	(45)
2016	Bordeaux Bègles	1	(0)
2017–2019	Sharks	32	(55)
2017–2019	Sharks (Currie Cup)	23	(40)
2020	Hurricanes	8	(40)
2020–2022	Leicester Tigers	18	(10)
2022–2023	Zebre Parma	10	(15)
- Correct as of 22 Apr 2023
International career
Years	Team	Apps	(Points)
2012	South Africa U20	1	(0)
- Correct as of 6 Jun 2020

Jacobus Petrus van Wyk (born 22 January 1992 in Nababeep) is a South African rugby player for Italian team Zebre Parma in United Rugby Championship. His regular position is centre or wing.

== Career ==
=== Youth ===
He represented Western Province at the Under-18 Craven Week competition in 2010. Later in the same year, he was also included in the Western Province U19 squad and made one appearance in the 2011 Under-19 Provincial Championship. In 2011, he made nine starts in the same competition, scoring five tries. In 2012 and 2013, he played for the Western Province U21 side, weighing in with four tries in each of those competitions.

=== Western Province / Stormers ===
He was included in the Western Province squad participating in the 2013 Vodacom Cup and made his first class debut as a substitute in their match against the Border Bulldogs in Paarl. He made a further four substitute appearances in that competition, scoring tries in their matches against SWD Eagles, Free State XV and the semi-final match against the Golden Lions.

In 2014, he was included in the Stormers squad for the 2014 Super Rugby season and was named in the starting line-up for their first match of the season against the Lions, despite having no Currie Cup experience or making a single first class start.

=== Bordeaux ===
In August 2016, French Top 14 side Bordeaux announced that they signed Van Wyk as a medical joker to replace the injured Darly Domvo. The deal would see Van Wyk arrive on a five-month deal until January 2017.

=== Leicester Tigers ===
On 20 July 2020, van Wyk signed for Leicester Tigers in England's Premiership Rugby from the 2020–21 season. After 18 appearances across two season's he was released from the club with immediate effect on 31 March 2022.

=== Zebre Parma ===
On 6 July 2022 van Wyk signed for Zebre Parma in the United Rugby Championship.

=== Representative rugby ===
Van Wyk was a late call-up to the South Africa Under-20 side during the 2012 IRB Junior World Championship held in South Africa, replacing Patrick Howard who suffered a hamstring injury during the tournament. He only made one appearance – starting the final against New Zealand, which South Africa won 22–16.
