= Dennis Visser =

South African rugby union player

- Born: 20 January 1993 (age 33) Benoni, South Africa
- Height: 2.00 m (6 ft 6 1/2 in)
- Weight: 120 kg (18 st 13 lb; 265 lb)
- School: Hoërskool Kempton Park, Kempton Park; Afrikaanse Hoër Seunskool, Pretoria
- University: University of Pretoria

Rugby union career
- Position: Lock
- Current team: Narbonne
Youth career
- 2009: Falcons
- 2012–2014: Blue Bulls
Amateur team(s)
Years	Team	Apps	(Points)
2013–2015	UP Tuks	15	(0)
2016	UFS Shimlas	6	(0)
Senior career
Years	Team	Apps	(Points)
2013–2015	Blue Bulls	1	(0)
2016	Griffons	6	(10)
2017–2019	Free State XV	8	(0)
2017–2019	Free State Cheetahs	12	(0)
2017–2019	Cheetahs	2	(0)
2018	→ Griffons	2	(0)
2019–2022	Narbonne	49	(5)
2022–2023	Zebre	2	(0)
2023–	Narbonne		
- Correct as of 24 Dec 2022
International career
Years	Team	Apps	(Points)
2013	South Africa Under-20	5	(0)
- Correct as of 22 Apr 2018

Dennis Visser (born 20 January 1993 in Benoni, South Africa) is a South African rugby union player who currently plays for the Narbonne in the Championnat Fédéral Nationale. His regular position is lock.

== Career ==
=== Falcons and Blue Bulls Under-19 (2009–2012) ===
At high school level, Visser represented East Rand side Falcons at the 2009 Under-16 Grant Khomo Week. He moved to Pretoria to complete his schooling Afrikaanse Hoër Seunskool and then joined the academy of the Pretoria-based Blue Bulls.

In 2012, he was a key member of the Blue Bulls U19 side that participated in the 2012 Under-19 Provincial Championship; he played in all fourteen of their matches in the competition, starting thirteen of those. His side finished in second spot on the log after the regular season to qualify for the play-offs, and Visser helped them beat the Sharks U19s 46–35 in the semi-final, but finished on the losing side in the final, as Western Province U19 became champions after a 22–18 win.

=== South Africa Under-20, Blue Bulls Under-21 and UP-Tuks (2013–2015) ===
Visser was selected to represent a South African Under-20 that played at the 2013 IRB Junior World Championship held in France and attempted to retain the title they won in 2012. Visser started all three pool matches as South Africa got off to a good start, beating the United States 97–0, England 31–24 and hosts France 26–19 to top their pool and to qualify to the semi-finals. He also started their semi-final match as they lost 17–18 to Wales, and in their third-place play-off match as they beat New Zealand 41–34 to finish the competition in third spot.

He returned to domestic action for the Blue Bulls U21 side during the 2013 Under-21 Provincial Championship. He didn't play in their first match of the season, but featured in all of their remaining thirteen matches, starting seven of those and also scoring a try in their match against Western Province U21 in a 21–32 defeat. The season had a similar outcome than the 2012 season with the Under-19s; the Blue Bulls U21s finished in second spot on the log to qualify for the semi-finals, they won their semi-final match against the Sharks – 36–13 on this occasion – before losing the final to Western Province, who won 30–23 in the match played in Durban.

The following season, Visser was included in the UP Tuks squad that participated in the 2014 Varsity Cup competition. He started all seven of their matches, but could not help his side qualify for the play-offs (the first time since in four seasons they failed to do so) as they finished in sixth position on the log. He made ten appearances for the Blue Bulls U21s in the 2014 Under-21 Provincial Championship, starting six of those as the Blue Bulls preferred Irné Herbst and Marvin Orie as their starting locks for the competition. Visser scored a try in their 143–0 demolition of Border U21 as the Blue Bulls finished in second spot on the log, but he didn't appear in the play-offs, as the Blue Bulls eventually won the competition, beating Western Province U21 20–10 in the final.

Visser again featured in all of UP Tuks' matches in the 2015 Varsity Cup competition. They improved on their 2014 showing and topped the log after the regular season to qualify for the semi-finals. Visser featured in their semi-final match against NWU Pukke, but could not help them reach the final, with the side from Potchefstroom winning 29–28 to progress instead. Visser also made his domestic first class debut just over a month later, as he appeared as a second-half replacement in the Blue Bulls' 2015 Vodacom Cup match against the Limpopo Blue Bulls. He ended on the winning side as the Blue Bulls won 83–13 against their affiliated sub-union. That was his last action of 2015, as an ankle injury ruled him out for the remainder of the year.

=== Cheetahs and UFS Shimlas (2016–2019) ===
Visser was named in the training squad of Bloemfontein-based Super Rugby franchise the Cheetahs for the 2016 Super Rugby season. In January 2016, he was released from the training squad to join Varsity Cup side UFS Shimlas. With Cheetahs he played also in Pro14 and with Free State Cheetahs in Currie Cup and Rugby Challenge.

=== Europe (2019–present) ===
From 2019 to 2022 he played with Narbonne. In 2022–23 United Rugby Championship season, Visser signed for Italian team Zebre.
