= 2013 Under-21 Provincial Championship =

The 2013 ABSA Under-21 Provincial Championship will be contested from 12 July to 26 October 2013. The tournament will feature the Under-21 players from the fourteen provincial rugby unions in South Africa.

== Competition ==
=== Group A ===
There are seven participating teams in the 2013 ABSA Under-21 Provincial Championship Group A. These teams will play each other twice over the course of the season, once at home and once away.

Teams will receive four points for a win and two points for a draw. Bonus points are awarded to teams that score 4 or more tries in a game, as well as to teams that lose a match by 7 points or less. Teams are ranked by points, then points difference (points scored less points conceded).

The top 4 teams will qualify for the title play-offs. In the semi-finals, the team that finish first has home advantage against the team that finish fourth, while the team that finish second has home advantage against the team that finish third. The winners of these semi-finals will play each other in the final, at the same venue as the 2013 Currie Cup Premier Division Final.

The bottom team in Group A will play a play-off game at home against the winner of the Group B final for a place in Group A in 2014.

=== Group B ===
There are eight participating teams in the 2013 ABSA Under-21 Provincial Championship Group B. These teams will play each other once over the course of the season, either at home or away.

Teams will receive four points for a win and two points for a draw. Bonus points are awarded to teams that score 4 or more tries in a game, as well as to teams that lose a match by 7 points or less. Teams are ranked by points, then points difference (points scored less points conceded).

The top 4 teams will qualify for the title play-offs. In the semi-finals, the team that finish first has home advantage against the team that finish fourth, while the team that finish second has home advantage against the team that finish third. The winners of these semi-finals will play each other in the final, at the same venue as the 2013 Currie Cup First Division Final.

The winner of the final will play a play-off game away from home against the bottom team in Group A for a place in Group A in 2014.

== Teams ==
Location of teams in 2013 ABSA Under-21 Provincial Championship
Group A
Group B

=== Team listing ===
The following teams will take part in the 2013 ABSA Under-21 Provincial Championship competition:

Group A
Team	Stadium/s
Blue Bulls U21	Loftus Versfeld, Pretoria
Border U21	Buffalo City Stadium, East London
Free State U21	Free State Stadium, Bloemfontein
Golden Lions U21	Ellis Park Stadium, Johannesburg
Leopards U21	Olën Park, Potchefstroom
Sharks U21	Kings Park Stadium, Durban
Western Province U21	Newlands Stadium, Cape Town

Group B
Team	Stadium/s
Boland U21	Boland Stadium, Wellington
Eastern Province U21	Nelson Mandela Bay Stadium, Port Elizabeth
Falcons U21	Barnard Stadium, Kempton Park
Griquas U21	Griqua Park, Kimberley
Griffons U21	North West Stadium, Welkom
Limpopo Blue Bulls U21	Peter Mokaba Stadium, Polokwane
Pumas U21	Mbombela Stadium, Mbombela
SWD U21	Outeniqua Park, George

== Group A ==
=== Table ===
2013 under-21 provincial championship group A
Pos	Team	Pld	W	D	L	PF	PA	PD	TF	TA	TB	LB	Pts	Qualification
1	Western Province U21	12	11	0	1	478	193	+285	67	26	9	1	54	Semi-finals
2	Blue Bulls U21	12	8	0	4	449	282	+167	60	34	7	2	41	Semi-finals
3	Sharks U21	12	8	0	4	423	301	+122	56	39	7	1	40	Semi-finals
4	Golden Lions U21	12	7	0	5	392	336	+56	53	41	6	2	36	Semi-finals
5	Free State U21	12	6	0	6	332	360	−28	44	48	6	1	31	
6	Leopards U21	12	2	0	10	321	500	−179	42	69	6	1	15	
7	Border U21	12	0	0	12	228	651	−423	33	98	3	0	3	Relegation play-off

Rules for classification: 4 points for a win; 2 points for a draw; 1 bonus point for a loss by seven points or less; 1 bonus point for scoring four or more tries in a match

=== Fixtures and results ===
- Fixtures are subject to change.
- All times are South African (GMT+2).

==== Regular season ====
===== Round one =====
12 July 2013	Leopards U21	17–59	Blue Bulls U21	Olën Park, Potchefstroom
17:00	Try: Louwrens Strydom 53'; Leon Meyer 81'; Con: Kobus du Plessis 54' (1/1); Ryno Smith 81' (1/1); Pen: Kobus du Plessis 18' (1/1); Cards: Marno Redelinghuys (yellow card) 47' to 57'; Ettienne Smith (yellow card) 61' to 73'; Armandt Stoman (yellow card) 67' to 77'	Scoreboard	Try: Jacques Nelius Rossouw 3'; Rudi van Rooyen 24', 72'; Kefentse Mahlo 49'; Christoph Gouws 59'; Dries Swanepoel 65'; Rohan Janse van Rensburg 70'; Con: Tony Jantjies 4', 25', 60', 66', 71' (5/6); Malcolm Theo 73' (1/1); Pen: Tony Jantjies 5', 11', 14', 42' (4/4); Cards: Shaun Adendorff (yellow card) 61' to 73'	Attendance: 250; Referee: Stephan Geldenhuys

13 July 2013	Border U21	32–53	Sharks U21	Buffalo City Stadium, East London
15:00	Try: Shaun Nieuwenhuyzen 3'; Angus Cleophas 39', 42'; Juan Bester 48'; James Michael Flynn 70'; Con: Wayne Gardner 40' (1/3); Dillon Smit 49' (1/2); Pen: Wayne Gardner 30' (1/3)	Scoreboard	Try: Tyler Fisher 10'; Stefan Ungerer 22', 25'; André Esterhuizen 38'; Robert du Preez 46'; Brendan Cope 63'; Sean Robinson 80'; Con: Robert du Preez 11', 22', 26', 39' (4/5); Brendan Cope 63', 81' (2/2); Pen: Robert du Preez 40' (1/2); Drop: Stefan Ungerer 58' (1/1); Cards: Tyler Fisher (yellow card) 49' to 59'; Stefan Lewies (yellow card) 59' to 70'

13 July 2013	Free State U21	18–16	Western Province U21	Free State Stadium, Bloemfontein
15:00	Try: Marco Mason 22'; Tertius Kruger 64'; Con: Lance James Ruthford (0/1); Marco Mason 65' (1/1); Pen: Lance James Ruthford (0/1); Marco Mason 71', 77' (2/2)	Scoreboard	Try: Kobus van Wyk 3'; Con: Tim Swiel 4' (1/1); Pen: Tim Swiel 13', 40' (2/2); Drop: Tim Swiel 75' (1/1); Cards: Kobus van Wyk (yellow card) 58' to 71'	Attendance: 300; Referee: Lusanda Jam

Bye/s: Golden Lions U21

===== Round two =====
19 July 2013	Sharks U21	17–24	Golden Lions U21	Kings Park Stadium, Durban
15:00	Try: Allan Dell 40', 55'; Con: Robert du Preez 40' (1/1); Brendan Cope 56' (1/1); Pen: Brendan Cope 78' (1/1); Cards: Stefan Ungerer (yellow card) 26' to 36'	Scoreboard	Try: Ruaan Lerm 12'; Gideon Meiring 37'; Henri Boshoff 49'; Con: Jaco van der Walt 12' (1/1); Marais Schmidt 38', 50' (2/2); Pen: Marais Schmidt 26' (1/2)

20 July 2013	Border U21	15–32	Free State U21	Buffalo City Stadium, East London
12:30	Try: Angus Cleophas 24'; Juan Bester 72'; Con: Angus Cleophas 25' (1/2); Pen: Wayne Gardner 31' (1/1)	Scoreboard	Try: Tienie Burger 13', 17'; Luan de Bruin 39'; Marco Mason 59'; Gerhard Olivier 67'; Con: Marco Mason 18', 68' (2/5); Pen: Marco Mason 50' (1/1)	Attendance: 500; Referee: Matt Kemp

20 July 2013	Western Province U21	55–10	Leopards U21	City Park Stadium, Athlone
16:00	Try: Patrick Howard 13'; Dillyn Leyds 19', 49', 64'; Godlen Masimla 27' penalty try 40'; Josh Katzen 45'; Tim Swiel 75'; Con: Tim Swiel 14', 20', 40', 46', 49', 76' (6/8); Pen: Tim Swiel 5' (1/1)	Scoreboard	Try: Marno Redelinghuys 77'; Con: Ryno Smith 78' (1/1); Pen: Ryno Smith 1' (1/1); Cards: Tiaan Loots (yellow card) 67' to 77'

Bye/s: Blue Bulls U21

===== Round three =====
26 July 2013	Leopards U21	26–17	Border U21	Olën Park, Potchefstroom
17:30	Try: Jaco Jordaan 4'; Sylvian Mahuza 18', 31'; Jaco Buys 41'; Con: Kobus du Plessis 19', 32', 42' (3/4); Cards: Ettienne Smith (yellow card) 52' to 62'; Marno Redelinghuys (yellow card) 68' to 79'	Scoreboard	Try: Duane Adams 8'; Dillon Smit 27'; Ernst Ladendorf 59'; Con: Lukhanyo Am (0/2); Angus Cleophas 60' (1/1); Pen: Wayne Gardner (0/1)	Referee: Lusanda Jam

27 July 2013	Golden Lions U21	23–25	Free State U21	Ellis Park Stadium, Johannesburg
15:00	Try: Percy Williams 2'; Ruaan Lerm 41'; Ashlon Davids 73'; Con: Marais Schmidt 3' (1/3); Pen: Marais Schmidt 27', 32' (2/2); Cards: Devon Martinus (red card) 22'	Scoreboard	Try: Sethu Tom 40'; Tienie Burger 46'; Con: Marco Mason (0/2); Pen: Marco Mason 8', 12', 54' (3/4); Drop: Noel Marx 17', 71' (2/2); Cards: Wickus Deysel (yellow card) 61'; Dolph Botha (yellow card) 62'	Attendance: 1,000; Referee: Francois Pretorius

27 July 2013	Western Province U21	14–6	Blue Bulls U21	City Park Stadium, Athlone
15:30	Try: Eital Bredenkamp 56'; Con: Tim Swiel (0/1); Pen: Tim Swiel 6', 21', 43' (3/3)	Scoreboard	Pen: Tony Jantjies 8', 18' (2/4)	Referee: Oregopotse Rametsi

Bye/s: Sharks U21

===== Round four =====
2 August 2013	Leopards U21	23 – 24	Golden Lions U21	Olën Park, Potchefstroom
17:00	Try: Jaco Buys 15'; Erno Nagy 66'; Con: Warren Gilbert 16', 67' (2/2); Pen: Warren Gilbert 11', 47', 52' (3/5)	Scoreboard	Try: Kwagga Smith 59'; Jacques Nel 70'; Con: Marais Schmidt 60' (1/2); Pen: Marais Schmidt 10', 25', 40', 75' (4/4); Cards: Mark Pretorius (yellow card) 47' to 57'	Referee: Quinton Immelman

3 August 2013	Sharks U21	36 – 25	Free State U21	Kings Park Stadium, Durban
15:00	Try: Brendan Cope 36'; André Esterhuizen 49', 70'; Johan Meyer 65'; Guy Alexander 78'; Con: Brendan Cope 37' (1/1); Robert du Preez 50', 71', 79' (3/4); Pen: Brendan Cope 27' (1/2)	Scoreboard	Try: JJ de Klerk 16'; Tertius Kruger 45'; Neil Claassen 62'; Dolph Botha 68'; Con: Noël Marx 63' (1/3); Pen: Marco Mason 5' (1/4)	Attendance: 350; Referee: Rasta Rasivhenge

3 August 2013	Border U21	14 – 66	Blue Bulls U21	Buffalo City Stadium, East London
12:30	Try: Juan Bester 21'; Johan Wagenaar 58'; Con: Janco Lehmann 22', 59' (2/2)	Scoreboard	Try: Tony Jantjies 1'; Travis Ismaiel 6', 43'; Paul Willemse 16'; Wiaan Liebenberg 34'; Jaco Visagie 37'; Damian van Wyk 49'; Jade Stighling 67'; Christopher Bosch 72'; Hencus van Wyk 76'; Con: Tony Jantjies 2', 7', 17', 35', 38', 50' (6/7); Malcolm Theo 73', 77' (2/3)	Attendance: 300; Referee: Ben Crouse

Bye/s: Western Province U21

===== Round five =====
9 August 2013	Leopards U21	18–62	Sharks U21	Olën Park, Potchefstroom
14:45	Try: Armandt Stoman 57'; Rowayne Beukman 79'; Con: Kobus du Plessis 58' (1/2); Pen: Warren Gilbert 2', 9' (2/2); Cards: Bouke Marnus Tack (yellow card) 26' to 36'	Scoreboard	Try: Sean Robinson 4'; Robert du Preez 18'; Hanco Venter 23'; Tyler Fisher 35'; André Esterhuizen 38', 47', 71'; Johan Meyer 67'; Guy Alexander 73'; Con: Robert du Preez 5', 19', 24', 48' (4/6); Brendan Cope 68', 72', 74' (3/3); Pen: Robert du Preez 11' (1/2); Drop: Robert du Preez (0/1)	Referee: Matt Kemp

9 August 2013	Blue Bulls U21	26–20	Golden Lions U21	Loftus Versfeld, Pretoria
16:30	Try: Kobus Marais 21'; Hencus van Wyk 51'; Con: Kobus Marais 22', 51' (2/2); Pen: Kobus Marais 11', 38', 65', 71' (4/4)	Scoreboard	Try: Kwagga Smith 34'; Peter-John Walters 40'; Con: Marais Schmidt 35', 40' (2/2); Pen: Marais Schmidt 19', 79' (2/3)	Attendance: 500; Referee: Daniel Fortuin

10 August 2013	Western Province U21	38–20	Border U21	Newlands Stadium, Cape Town
14:45	Try: Kobus van Wyk 3'; JP Lewis 17'; Godlen Masimla 26'; Carel du Preez 34', 55'; Jean Nel 70'; Con: Tim Swiel 4', 27', 56', 71' (4/6); Cards: Justin Benn (yellow card) 74'	Scoreboard	Try: Stephan Deyzel 48'; Etienne Taljaard 52' penalty try 74'; Con: Janco Lehmann 75' (1/3); Pen: Janco Lehmann 10' (1/1); Shaun Nieuwenhuyzen (0/1)

Bye/s: Free State U21

===== Round six =====
16 August 2013	Blue Bulls U21	40–27	Free State U21	Loftus Versfeld, Pretoria
16:45	Try: Jermaine Fabian Kleinsmith 4'; Jade Stighling 19'; Shaun Adendorff 40'; Rudi van Rooyen 53', 68'; Handré Pollard 62'; Con: Handré Pollard 5', 20', 54', 63', 69' (5/6); Pen: Handré Pollard (0/1); Malcolm Theo (0/1)	Scoreboard	Try: Stephen Griesel 32'; JJ de Klerk 79'; Con: Jan Stephanus Strumpher (0/1); Niel Marais 80' (1/1); Pen: Jan Stephanus Strumpher 8', 18', 27', 47', 57' (5/6)	Referee: Sindile Mayende

17 August 2013	Border U21	16–45	Golden Lions U21	Buffalo City Stadium, East London
15:00	Try: Shaun Nieuwenhuyzen 44'; Con: Janco Lehmann 45' (1/1); Pen: Janco Lehmann 11', 31', 38' (3/4); Drop: Shaun Nieuwenhuyzen (0/1)	Scoreboard	Try: Ruan Venter 3'; Marais Schmidt 24'; Ruan van Rensburg 34'; Damian Engledoe 51', 68'; Stephan de Wit 78'; Con: Marais Schmidt 4', 25', 35', 52', 69', 79' (6/6); Pen: Marais Schmidt 54' (1/1); Cards: Mark Pretorius (red card) 9'	Attendance: 300; Referee: Lusanda Jam

17 August 2013	Western Province U21	20–3	Sharks U21	Newlands Stadium, Cape Town
16:45	Try: Josh Katzen 23'; Craig Barry 42'; Con: Tim Swiel 24', 43' (2/2); Pen: Tim Swiel 14', 33' (2/3)	Scoreboard	Pen: Robert du Preez 20' (1/2)	Referee: Jaco van Heerden

Bye/s: Leopards U21

===== Round seven =====
23 August 2013	Free State U21	40–29	Leopards U21	Free State Stadium, Bloemfontein
16:40	Try: Stephen Griesel 15'; Henco Greyling 23', 53'; Maphutha Dolo 28', 39'; Sethu Tom 61'; Con: Marco Mason 16', 29' (2/5); Noël Marx (0/1); Pen: Marco Mason 3', 7' (2/2); Niel Marais (0/1)	Scoreboard	Try: Warren Gilbert 36'; Jaco Buys 57', 65'; Ryno Smith 71'; Con: Warren Gilbert 37', 58', 66' (3/4); Pen: Warren Gilbert 14' (1/1)	Referee: Jaco van Heerden

23 August 2013	Sharks U21	19–15	Blue Bulls U21	Kings Park Stadium, Durban
15:00	Try: Kotaro Matsushima 46'; Stefan Ungerer 63'; Con: Robert du Preez (0/2); Pen: Robert du Preez 2', 27', 61' (3/5)	Scoreboard	Try: Dries Swanepoel 30'; Jermaine Fabian Kleinsmith 37'; Con: Handré Pollard 30' (1/2); Pen: Handré Pollard 9' (1/2)	Referee: Marius van der Westhuizen

24 August 2013	Golden Lions U21	26–53	Western Province U21	Ellis Park Stadium, Johannesburg
15:00	Try: Jacques Jehan Nel 8', 50'; Kwagga Smith 36'; Devon Martinus 65'; Con: Marais Schmidt 8', 36', 51' (3/4)	Scoreboard	Try: Josh Katzen 5'; Kobus van Wyk 23'; Kyle Lombard 28', 61'; Oli Kebble 46'; Justin Benn 74'; Jean Nel 80'; Con: Dillyn Leyds 5', 23', 29', 61', 75', 81' (6/7); Pen: Dillyn Leyds 2', 40' (2/3)	Attendance: 300; Referee: Gerrie de Bruin

Bye/s: Border U21

===== Round eight =====
30 August 2013	Blue Bulls U21	48–33	Leopards U21	Loftus Versfeld, Pretoria
16:30	Try: Carlo Engelbrecht 14', 80'; Burger Odendaal 27'; Damian van Wyk 35', 40'; Roelof Smit 59'; Lwandile Pumelele Sompontsha 65'; Con: Kobus Marais 14', 27', 40', 59', 65' (5/7); Pen: Kobus Marais 10' (1/1); Cards: Lwandile Pumelele Sompontsha (yellow card) 39' to 49'	Scoreboard	Try: Adriaan Oosthuizen 12', 57'; Jaco Grobler 17'; Louis Vorster 39'; Marnus Tack 68'; Con: Warren Gilbert 17', 39', 58', 68' (4/5); Pen: Warren Gilbert (0/1); Cards: Ettienne Smith (yellow card) 74'	Attendance: 1,000; Referee: Matt Kemp

31 August 2013	Sharks U21	71–20	Border U21	Kings Park Stadium, Durban
14:45	Try: Khaya Majola 3'; Robert du Preez 8', 73'; Kotaro Matsushima 12'; Stefan Ungerer 14'; Tyler Fisher 20'; André Esterhuizen 23'; Alcino Marchiano Izaacs 48', 54'; Garath Meikle 59'; Jacques Taylor 69'; Con: Robert du Preez 9', 13', 15', 21', 24', 49' (6/9); Duncan Campbell 69', 74' (2/2)	Scoreboard	Try: Jan Hendrik Botha 37'; Shaun Nieuwenhuyzen 77'; Leroy Afrika 80'; Con: Angus Cleophas (0/1); Shaun Nieuwenhuyzen 78' (1/2); Pen: Angus Cleophas 27' (1/1)	Referee: Jaco van Heerden

31 August 2013	Western Province U21	32–13	Free State U21	A.F. Markötter Stadium, Stellenbosch
15:30	Try: Eital Bredenkamp 8'; Sikhumbuzo Notshe 35'; JP Lewis 40'; Craig Barry 73'; Con: Tim Swiel 9', 36', 40' (3/4); Pen: Tim Swiel 15', 65' (2/3)	Scoreboard	Try: Neil Claassen 5', 50'; Con: Marco Mason (0/1); Noël Marx (0/1); Pen: Marco Mason (0/1); Niel Marais 60' (1/1); Cards: Wikus Davis (yellow card) 40' to 49'	Referee: Ben Crouse

Bye/s: Golden Lions U21

===== Round nine =====
6 September 2013	Golden Lions U21	39–31	Sharks U21	Ellis Park Stadium, Johannesburg
15:00	Try: Jacques Jehan Nel 3'; Stephan de Wit 19'; Marais Schmidt 24'; Harold Vorster 45'; Damian Engledoe 62'; Con: Marais Schmidt 20', 25', 45', 63' (4/5); Pen: Marais Schmidt 54', 72' (2/3)	Scoreboard	Try: Allan Dell 6'; Alcino Marchiano Izaacs 35'; Dylan Mike Nel 77'; Con: Robert du Preez 35' (1/2); Duncan Campbell 77' (1/1); Pen: Robert du Preez 14', 26', 49', 57' (4/5)	Attendance: 200; Referee: Lusanda Jam

6 September 2013	Leopards U21	35–54	Western Province U21	Olën Park, Potchefstroom
16:30	Try: Marnus Tack 22'; Ryno Smith 49'; Jaco Grobler 57'; Eugene Pettit 73'; Con: Warren Gilbert 22', 49', 57' (3/4); Pen: Warren Gilbert 3', 6' (2/2); Drop: Warren Gilbert 36' (1/1); Cards: Ettienne Smith (yellow card) 28' to 38'	Scoreboard	Try: JP Lewis 7'; Justin Benn 13', 47'; Patrick Howard 32'; Devon Williams 40', 42'; Rayn Smid 53'; Eital Bredenkamp 63'; Con: Tim Swiel 8', 14', 33', 40', 48', 55', 64' (7/8)	Attendance: 200; Referee: Pieter Janse van Vuuren

7 September 2013	Free State U21	45–29	Border U21	Shimla Park, Bloemfontein
14:45	Try: Neil Claassen 15'; Dolph Botha 31'; JJ de Klerk 41'; Stephen Griesel 55'; Maphutha Dolo 57', 76'; Marco Mason 70'; Con: Noël Marx 16' (1/1); Marco Mason 32', 58' (2/4); Niel Marais 71', 77' (2/2)	Scoreboard	Try: Mario Noordman 24'; Johan Wagenaar 39'; Ernst Ladendorf 64'; Dillon Smit 73'; Con: Shaun Nieuwenhuyzen 25', 65' (2/3); Angus Cleophas 74' (1/1); Pen: Fanele Zwane 18' (1/1); Shaun Nieuwenhuyzen (0/1); Drop: Shaun Nieuwenhuyzen (0/1); Cards: Ernst Ladendorf (yellow card) 27' to 38'	Attendance: 200; Referee: Rasta Rasivhenge

Bye/s: Blue Bulls U21

===== Round ten =====
13 September 2013	Border U21	28–57	Leopards U21	Buffalo City Stadium, East London
13:00	Try: Siphesihle Praisegod Ngubane 11'; Ernst Ladendorf 59'; Mario Noordman 62'; Leroy Afrika 4'; Con: Shaun Nieuwenhuyzen 12', 60', 63', 5' (4/4)	Scoreboard	Try: Sarel Johannes Petrus Smith 16'; Adriaan Oosthuizen 23', 41', 7'; Jaco Jordaan 37'; Arno Ebersohn 47'; Tiaan Loots 69'; Erno Nagy 79'; Con: Warren Gilbert 17', 24', 38', 42', 70', 80', 8' (7/8); Pen: Warren Gilbert 65' (1/1)	Attendance: 150; Referee: Daniel Fortuin

13 September 2013	Free State U21	28–43	Golden Lions U21	Free State Stadium, Bloemfontein
16:45	Try: Noël Marx 33'; Sethu Tom 56'; Dolph Botha 79'; Con: Niel Marais 57', 80' (2/3); Pen: Niel Marais 7', 26', 38' (3/3)	Scoreboard	Try: Mark Pretorius 13'; Kwagga Smith 45'; Harold Vorster 48'; Marais Schmidt 63'; Jacques Nel 67'; PJ Walters 81'; Con: Marais Schmidt 14', 46', 49' (3/3); Jaco van der Walt 64', 68' (2/3); Pen: Marais Schmidt 76' (1/1); Drop: Jaco van der Walt (0/2)	Attendance: 500; Referee: Lusanda Jam

14 September 2013	Blue Bulls U21	21–32	Western Province U21	Loftus Versfeld, Pretoria
14:45	Try: Tony Jantjies 11'; Dennis Visser 20'; Irné Herbst 67'; Con: Tony Jantjies 12', 21' (2/2); Kobus Marais 68' (1/1); Cards: Hencus van Wyk (yellow card) 27' to 37'	Scoreboard	Try: Devon Williams 17'; Patrick Howard 28', 50'; Dillyn Leyds 40'; Con: Tim Swiel 18', 40', 51' (3/4); Pen: Tim Swiel 14', 80' (2/3)	Attendance: 3,000; Referee: Pro Legoete

Bye/s: Sharks U21

===== Round eleven =====
20 September 2013	Blue Bulls U21	70–19	Border U21	Loftus Versfeld, Pretoria
16:30	Try: Nardus van der Walt 1', 34'; Hencus van Wyk 6'; Justin Forwood 17'; Dries Swanepoel 42', 46'; Roelof Smit 59'; Travis Ismaiel 68'; Christopher Bosch 74'; Jacques Nelius Rossouw 80'; Con: Kobus Marais 2', 7', 17', 34', 42', 47', 60', 70', 75', 80' (10/10); Cards: Dennis Visser (yellow card) 62' to 72'	Scoreboard	Try: Nicol du Plessis 48'; Jan Hendrik Botha 63'; Christian Rust 65'; Con: Christian Rust 49', 66' (2/4)	Attendance: 2,000; Referee: Lusanda Jam

21 September 2013	Free State U21	16–39	Sharks U21	Free State Stadium, Bloemfontein
12:30	Try: Henco Venter 48'; Con: Niel Marais 49' (1/1); Pen: Niel Marais 5', 28', 54' (3/3); Drop: Noël Marx (0/1)	Scoreboard	Try: Guy Alexander 25'; Wiehan Hay 31'; Johan Meyer 45'; Sean Robinson 63'; Garath Meikle 71'; Wade Dean Elliot 76'; Con: Robert du Preez 26' (1/3); Duncan Campbell 72', 77' (2/3); Pen: Robert du Preez 20' (1/1)	Referee: Archie Sehlako

21 September 2013	Golden Lions U21	42–31	Leopards U21	Ellis Park Stadium, Johannesburg
14:30	Try: Nico Visser Du Plessis 2'; Stephan de Wit 17', 74', 79'; Peter-John Walters 32'; Ruaan Lerm 38'; Con: Marais Schmidt 3', 39', 80' (3/6); Pen: Marais Schmidt 56', 65' (2/3)	Scoreboard	Try: Tiaan Loots 10'; Adriaan Oosthuizen 21'; Jaco Buys 26', 43'; Ryno Anthony Pienaar 70'; Con: Ryno Smith 22', 27', 44' (3/5); Pen: Ryno Smith (0/2); Cards: Cayle Denner (yellow card) 74'	Attendance: 1,000; Referee: Ben Crouse

Bye/s: Western Province U21

===== Round twelve =====
27 September 2013	Border U21	12–74	Western Province U21	Buffalo City Stadium, East London
13:00	Try: Angus Cleophas 75'; Marlyn Williams 24'; Con: Wayne Gardner 76' (1/1); Christian Rust (0/1)	Scoreboard	Try: Sithembiso Sithole 34'; Tim Swiel 45', 28'; Devon Williams 48', 59'; Craig Barry 51', 7'; Patrick Howard 54', 68'; Justin Benn 1'; Kobus van Wyk 11'; Stephan Coetzee 21'; Con: Tim Swiel 28', 35', 46', 49', 52', 8', 22' (7/12)	Attendance: 250

27 September 2013	Sharks U21	33–13	Leopards U21	Kings Park Stadium, Durban
15:00	Try: André Esterhuizen 2'; Stefan Ungerer 46'; Hanco Venter 75'; Con: Robert du Preez 3', 47' (2/2); Duncan Campbell 76' (1/1); Pen: Robert du Preez 6', 29', 37' (3/3); Duncan Campbell 68' (1/2)	Scoreboard	Try: Tiaan Loots 7'; Con: Ryno Smith 8' (1/1); Pen: Sarel Johannes Petrus Smith (0/1); Ryno Smith 32', 40' (2/3)	Attendance: 0 Referee: Francois Pretorius

27 September 2013	Golden Lions U21	25–40	Blue Bulls U21	Ellis Park Stadium, Johannesburg
16:45	Try: Jannie Stander 19'; Jaco van der Walt 25'; Stephan de Wit 54'; Con: Marais Schmidt 26', 55' (2/3); Pen: Marais Schmidt 11', 37' (2/4); Cards: Mark Pretorius (yellow card) 61' to 72'	Scoreboard	Try: Jaco Visagie 3'; Hencus van Wyk 23'; Travis Ismaiel 39'; Roelof Smit 46', 58'; Jacques Rossouw 77'; Con: Kobus Marais 4', 24', 47', 59' (4/5); Tony Jantjies 78' (1/1); Pen: Kobus Marais (0/1); Drop: Jacques Rossouw (0/1)	Referee: Jaco Kotze

Bye/s: Free State U21

===== Round thirteen =====
4 October 2013	Blue Bulls U21	29–35	Sharks U21	Loftus Versfeld, Pretoria
16:45	Try: Jacques Rossouw 11'; Shaun Adendorff 17'; Nardus van der Walt 62'; Burger Odendaal 76'; Con: Tony Jantjies 12', 63', 77' (3/4); Pen: Tony Jantjies 35' (1/2)	Scoreboard	Try: Allan Dell 28'; Garath Meikle 49'; André Esterhuizen 57'; Robert du Preez 70'; Con: Duncan Campbell 29', 50' (2/3); Robert du Preez 71' (1/1); Pen: Duncan Campbell 4', 15', 52' (3/4); Cards: David Allan Fisher (yellow card) 59' to 69'	Referee: Quinton Immelman

4 October 2013	Leopards U21	29–38	Free State U21	Olën Park, Potchefstroom
19:00	Try: Jaco Jordaan 21'; Eugene Pettit 32'; Jaco Buys 43'; Tiaan Loots 51'; Corné Duvenage 54'; Con: Ryno Smith 22' (1/4); Kobus du Plessis 55' (1/1); Cards: Ettienne Smith (yellow card) 33' to 43'	Scoreboard	Try: Neil Claassen 5'; Ockert du Toit 12'; Stephen Griesel 15'; Henco Venter 26'; Tienie Burger 37'; Niell Jordaan 73'; Con: Niel Marais 12', 16', 27', 74' (4/6); Pen: Niel Marais (0/1)	Attendance: 200

5 October 2013	Western Province U21	39–5	Golden Lions U21	Newlands Stadium, Cape Town
11:45	Try: Patrick Howard 5', 38'; Devon Williams 8', 66'; Craig Barry 31'; Rayn Smid 53'; Justin Benn 72'; Con: Tim Swiel (0/4); Dillyn Leyds 54', 67' (2/3); Pen: Dillyn Leyds (0/1)	Scoreboard	Try: Marais Schmidt 28'; Con: Marais Schmidt (0/1)	Referee: Jaco van Heerden

Bye/s: Leopards U21

===== Round fourteen =====
12 October 2013	Free State U21	27–29	Blue Bulls U21	Free State Stadium, Bloemfontein
14:45	Try: Neil Claassen 9'; Stephen Griesel 26'; Kevin Luiters 48'; Tienie Burger 64'; Con: Niel Marais 27', 49' (2/4); Pen: Niel Marais 57' (1/2)	Scoreboard	Try: Travis Ismaiel 11'; Hencus van Wyk 16'; Carlo Engelbrecht 37'; Con: Kobus Marais 38' (1/3); Pen: Kobus Marais 23', 42', 71' (3/3); Drop: Kobus Marais 51' (1/1); Cards: Nardus van der Walt (yellow card) 63' to 73'	Attendance: 1,500; Referee: François Groenewald

12 October 2013	Golden Lions U21	76–7	Border U21	Ellis Park Stadium, Johannesburg
12:45	Try: Fabian Booysen 3'; Damian Engledoe 6', 51'; Harold Vorster 15'; Ruaan Lerm 27'; Stephan de Wit 32', 35'; Lourens Erasmus 44', 72'; Jacques Nel 54'; Marais Schmidt 57'; Matt Torrance 81'; Con: Marais Schmidt 4', 55', 57', 73', 82' (5/7); Jaco van der Walt 28', 33', 36' (3/5)	Scoreboard	Try: Fanelesibonge Sikhumbuzo Sifiso Zwane 19'; Con: Christian Rust 20' (1/1); Pen: Christian Rust (0/1); Cards: Lucky Ngcamu (yellow card) 48' to 58'	Referee: Stephan Geldenhuys

12 October 2013	Sharks U21	24–51	Western Province U21	Kings Park Stadium, Durban
16:45	Try: Garath Robert Meikle 6'; Sean Robinson 55'; Kotaro Matsushima 77'; Johan Meyer 79'; Con: Robert du Preez (0/1); Duncan Campbell 56', 77' (2/3); Pen: Robert du Preez (0/1); Drop: Robert du Preez (0/1); Cards: Maks van Dyk (yellow card) 80'	Scoreboard	Try: Johnny Kôtze 19', 60'; Tim Swiel 24'; Craig Barry 35'; Justin Ackerman 38'; Stephan Coetzee 72'; Con: Tim Swiel 20', 25', 36', 39', 61', 73' (6/6); Pen: Tim Swiel 12', 30', 81' (3/3)

Bye/s: Border U21

==== Play-off games ====
===== Semi-finals =====
19 October 2013	Western Province U21	44–41 (aet)	Golden Lions U21	Newlands Stadium, Cape Town
12:00	Try: Mike Willemse 10'; Devon Williams 18'; Craig Barry 40'; Tim Swiel 46'; Eital Bredenkamp 61', 90'; Con: Tim Swiel 11', 19', 47', 91' (4/7); Pen: Tim Swiel 55', 100' (2/3)	Scoreboard	Try: Damian Engledoe 23'; PJ Walters 27', 104'; Mark Pretorius 65'; Ruaan Lerm 82'; Con: Marais Schmidt 24', 28', 66', 82', 104' (5/5); Pen: Marais Schmidt 4', 9' (2/3)

19 October 2013	Blue Bulls U21	36–13	Sharks U21	Loftus Versfeld, Pretoria
15:00	Try: Jacques Rossouw 24'; Jan Serfontein 41'; Wiaan Liebenberg 65'; Con: Handré Pollard (0/3); Pen: Handré Pollard 11', 14', 28', 34', 49', 52', 59' (7/7); Drop: Handré Pollard (0/1); Cards: Du Toit Genis (yellow card) 76'	Scoreboard	Try: Dylan Nel 37'; Con: Duncan Campbell 38' (1/1); Pen: Duncan Campbell 17', 31' (2/4)	Attendance: 2,000

===== Final =====
26 October 2013	Western Province U21	30–23	Blue Bulls U21	Newlands Stadium, Cape Town
14:30	Try: Josh Katzen 35', 48'; Patrick Howard 66'; Con: Tim Swiel 36', 49', 67' (3/3); Pen: Tim Swiel 2', 12', 23' (3/3)	Scoreboard	Try: William Small-Smith 29'; Dries Swanepoel 72'; Con: Handré Pollard 30' (1/1); Tony Jantjies 72' (1/1); Pen: Handré Pollard 8', 20', 60' (3/4); Drop: Handré Pollard (0/1); Cards: Irné Herbst (yellow card) 50' to 61'	Referee: Rasta Rasivhenge

== Group B ==
=== Table ===
2013 under-21 provincial championship group B
Pos	Team	Pld	W	D	L	PF	PA	PD	TF	TA	TB	LB	Pts	Qualification
1	Eastern Province U21 (Q)	7	7	0	0	388	110	+278	55	15	7	0	35	Semi-finals
2	Boland U21	7	6	0	1	334	139	+195	52	18	6	0	30	Semi-finals
3	Limpopo Blue Bulls U21	7	5	0	2	284	136	+148	44	16	6	2	28	Semi-finals
4	Griquas U21	7	3	0	4	159	244	−85	22	38	3	2	17	Semi-finals
5	Griffons U21	7	3	0	4	156	263	−107	21	43	3	0	15	
6	Falcons U21	7	2	0	5	156	316	−160	24	47	4	1	13	
7	Pumas U21	7	2	0	5	156	224	−68	22	35	2	1	11	
8	SWD U21	7	0	0	7	125	326	−201	18	46	2	1	3	

(Q) Qualified to a promotion play-off game

=== Fixtures and results ===
- Fixtures are subject to change.
- All times are South African (GMT+2).

==== Regular season ====
===== Round one =====
16 August 2013	Pumas U21	20–46	Eastern Province U21	Mbombela Stadium, Mbombela
16:20	Try: Johan Pretorius 29'; Dirk Louwies 36'; Pule Sibiya 40'; Con: Juan van der Merwe 36' (1/3); Pen: Juan van der Merwe 11' (1/2)	Scoreboard	Try: Siphesihle Punguzwa 3'; Eben Barnard 10'; Sergeal Petersen 12'; Aidon Davis 25'; Kevin Kaba 47'; Kuhle Sonkosi 53'; Juan Smit 62'; Siviwe Soyizwapi 71'; Con: Marlou van Niekerk 3', 11' (2/5); Shane Gates 62' (1/3); Pen: Shane Gates (0/1)	Attendance: 500; Referee: Pro Legoete

16 August 2013	SWD U21	0–60	Limpopo Blue Bulls U21	Outeniqua Park, George
17:00	Pen: Eldred Garth James (0/1); Cards: Bradley John Jumaats (red card) 67'	Scoreboard	Try: Corne Willem Ras 5', 55'; Willie Engelbrecht 11', 40'; Werner van Heese 19', 33'; Oskar Jan Maximillian Calitz 25'; James Courtney Wepener 29'; Benard Nortje 68'; Trent Williams 81'; Con: Marcel Enslen Steyn Scholtz 5', 30', 34', 40', 56' (5/9); Jonty B Shelton (0/1); Cards: Ivan George Hill (yellow card) 64' to 74'	Attendance: 550; Referee: Archie Sehlako

17 August 2013	Griffons U21	32–30	Falcons U21	North West Stadium, Welkom
13:00	Try: Ryno Venter 11'; Ernst Frederick Wepener 14'; Wayne Ludick 49'; Thabiso Kgobe 51'; Con: Ryno Venter 12', 15', 52' (3/4); Pen: Ryno Venter 58', 70' (2/2)	Scoreboard	Try: Friedle Olivier 27'; Ernst Behr 31', 67'; Ruben Smith 40', 54'; Con: Deon Steve Robert Hendrikz 55' (1/4); Ruben Smith (0/1); Pen: Deon Steve Robert Hendrikz 13' (1/2); Cards: Thabang Romeo Matsolo (yellow card) 19' to 29'	Attendance: 400; Referee: Daniel Fortuin

17 August 2013	Griquas U21	28–78	Boland U21	Griqua Park, Kimberley
14:30	Try: Arrie van der Berg 6'; Marthinus Petrus van der Merwe 33'; Rossouw Pienaar 39'; Jonty George Gray 66'; Con: Juan Vos 6', 33', 39' (3/3); Jonty George Gray 66' (1/1); Pen: Juan Vos (0/1)	Scoreboard	Try: Wade Schoor 9'; Kirwan Horsemend 13', 52', 74', 78'; Kelvin Fikster 24'; Johann Stephanus Alberts Lambrechts 27'; Francois Daniel Basson 55'; Juandre Dylan Joseph 57'; Lee-Heino Appollis 69'; Ashley Esau 71'; Arno Fortuin 80'; Con: Ashley Esau 9', 13', 24', 27', 52', 57', 71' (7/9); Sherwin Clyde Dyson 74', 80' (2/3)	Attendance: 300; Referee: Tiaan Jonker

===== Round two =====
23 August 2013	Eastern Province U21	58–7	Griffons U21	Nelson Mandela Bay Stadium, Port Elizabeth
16:15	Try: Foxy Ntleki 7', 17', 36'; Siviwe Soyizwapi 14', 44'; Ruan Roberts 26'; Marlou van Niekerk 30'; Siphesihle Punguzwa 39'; Aidon Davis 42'; Wayven Smith 67'; Con: Marlou van Niekerk 27', 43' (2/6); Sonwabo Majola 37' (1/3); Juan Smit 68' (1/1); Cards: Pieter Stemmet (yellow card) 61' to 71'	Scoreboard	Try: Wayne Ludick 79'; Con: Ryno Venter 80' (1/1); Cards: Thembelani Mabomba (yellow card) 47' to 57'; Wayne Ludick (yellow card) 57' to 67'; Brain Meyer (yellow card) 65' to 75'	Attendance: 500; Referee: Pro Legoete

24 August 2013	Falcons U21	28–39	Griquas U21	Barnard Stadium, Kempton Park
12:40	Try: Adriaan van den Berg 1'; Maxwell Amos Sehoole 3', 34'; Friedle Olivier 37', 46'; Con: Deon Steve Robert Hendrikz (0/3); Ruben Smith (0/2); Pen: Deon Steve Robert Hendrikz 27' (1/1); Cards: Maxwell Amos Sehoole (yellow card) 22' to 32'; Ruben Smith (yellow card) 50' to 60'	Scoreboard	Try: Jacob Daniel de Jager 6'; Marthinus Petrus van der Merwe 24'; George John du Raan 52'; Hendrik Arnoldus Pretorius 61'; Elgernon Bramwell Grant Diamonds 70'; Ruan Marais Roets 74'; Con: Juan Vos 52' (1/2); Jonty George Gray 24', 74' (2/4); Pen: Jonty George Gray 80' (1/2)	Attendance: 100; Referee: Stephan Geldenhuys

24 August 2013	Boland U21	56–24	SWD U21	Boland Stadium, Wellington
14:00	Try: Conway Pretorius 16', 19'; Juandre Dylan Joseph 21', 44'; Arno Fortuin 23', 38'; Wade Schoor 30'; Kirwan Horsemend 36'; Johann Stephanus Alberts Lambrechts 67'; Con: Ashley Esau 17', 19', 22' (3/7); Arno Fortuin (0/1); Sherwin Clyde Dyson 68' (1/1); Pen: Ashley Esau 5' (1/1); Cards: Jos Malherbe (yellow card) 62' to 73'	Scoreboard	Try: Chris Willemse 72'; Dillin Christo-Lee Snel 76'; Marcelino Marais 77'; Con: Chris Willemse 73', 77', 78' (3/3); Pen: C-Than Justin Moos 3' (1/1)	Attendance: 400; Referee: Daniel Fortuin

24 August 2013	Limpopo Blue Bulls U21	53–19	Pumas U21	Peter Mokaba Stadium, Polokwane
16:00	Try: Benard Nortjé 12'; Donovan Harry O'Grady 18'; Willie Engelbrecht 28', 53', 78'; Wolta Thokozane Mtsweni 43'; Jonty B Shelton 63'; Marcel Enslen Steyn Scholtz 71'; Con: Marcel Enslen Steyn Scholtz 19', 28', 54', 72', 79' (5/8); Pen: Marcel Enslen Steyn Scholtz (0/1); Drop: Marcel Enslen Steyn Scholtz 38' (1/1)	Scoreboard	Try: Christo Nelson 34'; Cornelius Rautenbach 47'; Johan Pretorius 73'; Con: Morné van den Berg 35' (1/2); Juan van der Merwe 74' (1/1); Cards: Eugene Beukes (yellow card) 15' to 25'; Joe Herrmann (yellow card) 27' to 37'	Attendance: 150; Referee: Eduan Nel

===== Round three =====
30 August 2013	SWD U21	22–36	Falcons U21	Outeniqua Park, George
16:45	Try: Jerome Fillies 28'; Chris Willemse 38'; Linden Edward Rhode 59'; Con: Chris Willemse 29', 39' (2/3); Pen: Chris Willemse 13' (1/2); Cards: Jade Lucius Roelfse (red card) 45'	Scoreboard	Try: Friedle Olivier 21'; Gary Woolls 41'; Juan van der Merwe 45'; Adriaan van den Berg 50'; John George Spence 70'; JP Brummer 76'; Con: Ruben Smith 46' (1/4); Kazlo Semone Holtzhausen 71', 77' (2/2); Pen: Kazlo Semone Holtzhausen (0/1)	Attendance: 150; Referee: Pro Legoete

31 August 2013	Griquas U21	0–53	Eastern Province U21	Griqua Park, Kimberley
13:30	Pen: Jonty George Gray (0/2); Cards: Johann Strauss (yellow card) 30' to 40'	Scoreboard	Try: Sonwabo Majola 19', 68'; Marlou van Niekerk 22'; Wayven Smith 30'; Claude Tshidibi 47'; Aidon Davis 53'; Aya Dlepu 56'; Brendan Hector 81'; Con: Ruan Allerston 20', 23', 47', 57', 82' (5/8); Pen: Ruan Allerston 12' (1/1); Cards: Claude Tshidibi (yellow card) 63' to 73'	Attendance: 50; Referee: Gerrie de Bruin

31 August 2013	Griffons U21	12–36	Pumas U21	North West Stadium, Welkom
13:40	Try: Jacques Labuschagné 42'; Juandré du Plessis 59'; Con: Ryno Venter 43' (1/2); Pen: Ryno Venter (0/1)	Scoreboard	Try: Dirk Louwies 6'; Pule Sibiya 12', 77'; Pieter Killian 19'; Edwin Oliver 56'; Con: Juan van der Merwe 6', 13', 57' (3/4); Christo Nelson 78' (1/1); Pen: Juan van der Merwe 31' (1/3)	Attendance: 100; Referee: Pieter Janse van Vuuren

31 August 2013	Limpopo Blue Bulls U21	25–31	Boland U21	Bela-Bela
16:00	Try: Anrich Francois du Plessis 34'; Donovan Harry O'Grady 44'; Willie Engelbrecht 57'; Con: Marcel Enslen Steyn Scholtz 35', 45' (2/3); Pen: Marcel Enslen Steyn Scholtz 48' (1/2); Drop: Marcel Enslen Steyn Scholtz 20' (1/1); Cards: Stuart Malcolm Austin (yellow card) 64' to 74'	Scoreboard	Try: Jovelian de Koker 30'; Kirwan Horsemend 40'; Gerswin Moses 53'; Ashley Esau 66'; Con: Ashley Esau 31', 40', 54', 67' (4/4); Pen: Ashley Esau 73' (1/2); Cards: Conway Pretorius (yellow card) 64' to 74'	Attendance: 100; Referee: Lihan Pretorius

===== Round four =====
6 September 2013	Eastern Province U21	76–16	SWD U21	Nelson Mandela Bay Stadium, Port Elizabeth
16:30	Try: Eben Barnard 15', 26'; Vukile Sofisa 23', 56'; Sonwabo Majola 30'; Aya Dlepu 41', 48'; Marlou van Niekerk 59'; Siphesihle Punguzwa 62', 75'; Siviwe Soyizwapi 70', 79'; Con: Shane Gates 24', 31' (2/5); Marlou van Niekerk 49' (1/1); Ruan Allerston 57', 60', 63', 71', 80' (5/6); Pen: Shane Gates (0/1)	Scoreboard	Try: Dillin Christo-Lee Snel 37'; Con: Chris Willemse 38' (1/1); Pen: Chris Willemse 1', 8', 25' (3/3); Cards: Linden Rhode (yellow card) 22' to 32'	Attendance: 500; Referee: Ben Crouse

6 September 2013	Pumas U21	20–24	Griquas U21	Mbombela Stadium, Mbombela
16:45	Try: Nkululeko Henson Ngozo 34'; Edwin Oliver 59'; Con: Christo Nelson 35' (1/1); Juan van der Merwe 60' (1/1); Pen: Christo Nelson 26' (1/1); Juan van der Merwe 51' (1/4)	Scoreboard	Try: Nicolaas Steyn 9'; Leroy Bitterhout 20'; Johann Strauss 69'; Con: Jonty George Gray 10', 21', 70' (3/3); Pen: Leroy Bitterhout (0/1); Jonty George Gray 76' (1/1)	Attendance: 500; Referee: François Groenewald

7 September 2013	Falcons U21	8–69	Boland U21	Barnard Stadium, Kempton Park
12:15	Try: Friedle Olivier 40'; Con: Deon Steve Robert Hendrikz (0/1); Pen: Deon Steve Robert Hendrikz 4' (1/1)	Scoreboard	Try: Gerswin Moses 12', 42'; Ashley Esau 20'; Branden Hunter 24'; Chaney Willemse 26', 28'; Tiaan Ramat 45'; Juandre Dylan Joseph 50'; Conway Pretorius 61', 77'; Kirwan Horsemend 78'; Con: Ashley Esau 21', 25', 27', 43', 46', 51', 78' (7/11)	Attendance: 100; Referee: Archie Sehlako

7 September 2013	Griffons U21	20–41	Limpopo Blue Bulls U21	North West Stadium, Welkom
13:00	Try: LC van Tonder 58'; Nathaniel Coetzee 66'; Con: Ryno Venter 59', 67' (2/2); Pen: Ryno Venter 16', 37' (2/3); Cards: Thabiso Kgobe (yellow card) 74'; Brain Meyer (yellow card) 77'	Scoreboard	Try: Robey Leibrandt 3'; Trent Williams 7'; Werner van Heese 21', 33'; Oskar Jan Maximillian Calitz 55'; Willie Engelbrecht 76'; Marcel Enslen Steyn Scholtz 80'; Con: Marcel Enslen Steyn Scholtz 8', 55', 76' (3/7); Cards: Frederik Johannes Nel (yellow card) 60' to 70'	Attendance: 100; Referee: Jaco van Heerden

===== Round five =====
13 September 2013	Boland U21	17–31	Eastern Province U21	Boland Stadium, Wellington
13:30	Try: Johann Stephanus Alberts Lambrechts 19'; Kirwan Horsemend 42', 80'; Con: Ashley Esau 43' (1/2); Sherwin Clyde Dyson (0/1); Cards: Wade Schoor (yellow card) 48' to 58'; Conway Pretorius (yellow card) 78'	Scoreboard	Try: Marlou van Niekerk 5', 17'; Siviwe Soyizwapi 34'; Aidon Davis 52'; Con: Ruan Allerston 6', 18', 35', 53' (4/4); Pen: Ruan Allerston 32' (1/2)	Attendance: 380; Referee: Jaco Kotze

13 September 2013	SWD U21	31–32	Pumas U21	Outeniqua Park, George
16:45	Try: Nathan Lee Luiters 7'; Dillin Christo-Lee Snel 43'; Jerome Fillies 50', 59', 76'; Con: Chris Willemse 8', 44', 51' (3/4); Eldred Garth James (0/1); Pen: Chris Willemse (0/1); Cards: Jason Stanley Bloemstein (yellow card) 66' to 77'	Scoreboard	Try: Pule Sibiya 26'; Pieter Killian 37'; Kyran Odendaal 46', 70'; Cornelius Rautenbach 66'; Con: Juan van der Merwe 38' (1/4); Christo Nelson 71' (1/1); Pen: Juan van der Merwe 55' (1/1)	Attendance: 225; Referee: Sindile Mayende

14 September 2013	Griquas U21	24–31	Griffons U21	Griqua Park, Kimberley
12:45	Try: Lyvette Shikwambana 8'; Reynardt Muller 21'; Marthinus Petrus van der Merwe 71'; George John du Raan 82'; Con: Jonty George Gray 21' (1/3); Leroy Bitterhout 83' (1/1)	Scoreboard	Try: Henry Hall 29'; Wynand Phillipus Breytenbach 56', 77'; Jacques Phillip le Roux 60'; Willem Hermanus van Staden 73'; Con: Ryno Venter 30', 57', 74' (3/5); Pen: Ryno Venter (0/1); Cards: Jacques Phillip le Roux (yellow card) 70' to 80'	Referee: Jason Jaftha

14 September 2013	Limpopo Blue Bulls U21	48–10	Falcons U21	Peter Mokaba Stadium, Polokwane
15:00	Try: Graham John Logan 11'; Primo Ncube 29'; Divan Nel 37'; Pieter Jan Kruger 58', 72'; Jonty B Shelton 62'; Jan-Boland Deysel 79'; Con: Marcel Enslen Steyn Scholtz 30', 38', 59', 63', 80' (5/7); Pen: Marcel Enslen Steyn Scholtz 6' (1/2); Cards: Graham John Logan (yellow card) 21' to 31'; Heinrich Els (yellow card) 68' to 78'	Scoreboard	Try: Mandla Mdaka 32'; Con: Deon Steve Robert Hendrikz 33' (1/1); Pen: Deon Steve Robert Hendrikz 41' (1/2); Cards: Fanie Raseroka (yellow card) 71'	Attendance: 100; Referee: Stephan Geldenhuys

===== Round six =====
20 September 2013	Eastern Province U21	87–17	Falcons U21	Nelson Mandela Bay Stadium, Port Elizabeth
16:30	Try: Kuhle Sonkosi 5'; Sphu Msutwana 8'; Eben Barnard 30', 37'; Wayven Smith 32'; Siviwe Soyizwapi 34', 43'; Siphesihle Punguzwa 39', 49'; Sonwabo Majola 68', 80'; Yakha Qinela 74'; Shane Gates 76'; Con: Ruan Allerston 6', 9', 31', 33', 38', 40', 44', 50' (8/9); Gavin Hauptfleisch 75', 77', 80' (3/4)	Scoreboard	Try: Daymin Brendon Jansen van Vuuren 57'; Friedle Olivier 78'; Con: Paul Walters 58', 79' (2/2); Pen: Paul Walters (0/1); Drop: Deon Steve Robert Hendrikz 10' (1/1); Cards: Mandla Mdaka (yellow card) 27' to 38'	Attendance: 500; Referee: Sindile Mayende

21 September 2013	Pumas U21	10–31	Boland U21	Mbombela Stadium, Mbombela
12:30	Try: Christo Nelson 77'; Con: Juan van der Merwe 78' (1/1); Pen: Juan van der Merwe 7' (1/2); Cards: Willem de Beer (yellow card) 40' to 50'	Scoreboard	Try: Ernst Claassen 19'; Glendon du Plessis 24' penalty try 36'; Kyle Mettler 60'; Jovelian de Koker 81'; Con: Ashley Esau 36' (1/3); Sherwin Clyde Dyson 61', 81' (2/2)	Attendance: 250; Referee: Stephan Geldenhuys

21 September 2013	Griffons U21	41–22	SWD U21	North West Stadium, Welkom
13:00	Try: Dean Adrian Rossouw 5'; Ryno Venter 11', 63'; Ernst Frederick Wepener 48'; LC van Tonder 60'; Con: Ryno Venter 12' (1/2); Andries Stefanus Johannes de Wet 64' (1/3); Pen: Ryno Venter 3', 17' (2/2); Drop: Andries Stefanus Johannes de Wet 18', 34' (2/2); Cards: Lukas Johannes van der Walt (yellow card) 78'	Scoreboard	Try: Jerome Fillies 9'; Jade Lucius Roelfse 21'; Chris Willemse 36'; Kirsten Heyns 73'; Con: Chris Willemse (0/3); C-Than Justin Moos 74' (1/1); Drop: Chris Willemse (0/1)	Attendance: 100; Referee: Cwengile Jadezweni

21 September 2013	Griquas U21	19–24	Limpopo Blue Bulls U21	Itech Park, Kimberley
14:30	Try: Leroy Bitterhout 2'; Renier Botha 22'; Con: Jonty George Gray (0/1); Leroy Bitterhout (0/1); Pen: Marthinus Petrus van der Merwe 33' (1/1); Jonty George Gray 49', 65' (2/3); Cards: Juno de Castro (yellow card) 10' to 20'	Scoreboard	Try: Benard Nortjé 10'; Barend Jakobus Erasmus Wessels 20'; Donovan Harry O'Grady 62'; Robey Leibrandt 67'; Con: Marcel Enslen Steyn Scholtz 11', 68' (2/4)	Attendance: 150; Referee: Pro Legoete

===== Round seven =====
27 September 2013	Falcons U21	27–19	Pumas U21	Barnard Stadium, Kempton Park
12:30	Try: Deon Steve Robert Hendrikz 2'; Friedle Olivier 26', 77'; Fanie Raseroka 72'; Con: Deon Steve Robert Hendrikz (0/1); Kazlo Semone Holtzhausen 27', 78' (2/3); Pen: Deon Steve Robert Hendrikz (0/1); Kazlo Semone Holtzhausen 57' (1/1)	Scoreboard	Try: Jan Arnoldus Els 13'; Thembinkosi Sphamandla Thabang Nkosi 64'; Pule Sibiya 80'; Con: Kyran Odendaal 14' (1/1); Johan Pretorius 81' (1/2)	Referee: Jaco van Heerden

27 September 2013	Boland U21	52–13	Griffons U21	Boland Stadium, Wellington
12:45	Try: Roland Swarts 14'; Siphokuhle Mbobosi 21', 27'; SP Wessels 32', 47'; Francois Daniel Basson 48'; Branden Hunter 52'; Juandre Dylan Joseph 76'; Con: Ashley Esau 15', 28', 33', 47', 49', 76' (6/8)	Scoreboard	Try: Wayne Ludick 55', 67'; Con: Ryno Venter (0/2); Pen: Ryno Venter 19' (1/2)	Attendance: 0 Referee: Sindile Mayende

27 September 2013	SWD U21	10–25	Griquas U21	Outeniqua Park, George
15:00	Try: Linden Edward Rhode 28'; Jerome Fillies 79'; Con: Chris Willemse (0/1); Eldred James (0/1); Cards: Ansley Stephan Theunissen (yellow card) 78'	Scoreboard	Try: Leroy Bitterhout 45'; Marthinus Petrus van der Merwe 52'; Jonty George Gray 72'; Con: Jonty George Gray 46', 73' (2/3); Pen: Jonty George Gray 23', 48' (2/3); Drop: Marthinus Petrus van der Merwe (0/1)	Attendance: 250; Referee: Lihan Pretorius

28 September 2013	Limpopo Blue Bulls U21	33–37	Eastern Province U21	Groblersdal
16:00	Try: Pieter Jan Kruger 1'; Oskar Jan Maximillian Calitz 8'; Bernthardt John Richard Gerntholtz 14'; Werner van Heese 38'; Daniel Hart 53'; Con: Marcel Enslen Steyn Scholtz 9', 15', 39', 54' (4/5); Pen: Marcel Enslen Steyn Scholtz (0/1); Cards: Barend Jakobus Erasmus Wessels (yellow card) 34' to 44'; Donovan Harry O'Grady (yellow card) 60' to 70'	Scoreboard	Try: Shane Gates 22'; Siphesihle Punguzwa 30'; Aidon Davis 42'; Sinethemba Ndita 61'; Con: Ruan Allerston 23', 31', 43', 62' (4/4); Pen: Ruan Allerston 11', 70' (2/2); Andile Jho 79' (1/1); Cards: Claude Tshidibi (yellow card) 13' to 23'	Attendance: 100; Referee: Matt Kemp

==== Play-off games ====
===== Semi-finals =====
4 October 2013	Boland U21	25–22	Limpopo Blue Bulls U21	Boland Stadium, Wellington
16:00	Try: Jovelian de Koker 38', 56'; Conway Pretorius 53'; Arno Fortuin 76'; Con: Ashley Esau 39' (1/3); Arno Fortuin (0/1); Pen: Ashley Esau 5' (1/3)	Scoreboard	Try: Marcel Enslen Steyn Scholtz 18'; James Courtney Wepener 25', 32'; Jerome Daniël Bastick 48'; Con: Marcel Enslen Steyn Scholtz 49' (1/4)	Attendance: 250; Referee: Daniel Fortuin

4 October 2013	Eastern Province U21	44–26	Griquas U21	Nelson Mandela Bay Stadium, Port Elizabeth
16:30	Try: Wayven Smith 17', 27', 43', 53'; Siviwe Soyizwapi 69'; Con: Ruan Allerston 18', 28', 44', 54' (4/4); Gavin Hauptfleisch 70' (1/1); Pen: Ruan Allerston 14', 49', 63' (3/4); Cards: Aidon Davis (yellow card) 78'; Siphesihle Punguzwa (yellow card) 80'	Scoreboard	Try: Nicolaas Steyn 39'; Johann Strauss 67'; Stephan Steyn 72'; Renier Botha 80'; Con: Jonty George Gray (0/4); Pen: Jonty George Gray 11', 35' (2/3); Cards: Ceagan Allan van der Linde (yellow card) 63' to 74'	Attendance: 100; Referee: Stephan Geldenhuys

===== Final =====
11 October 2013	Eastern Province U21	59–19	Boland U21	Mbombela Stadium, Mbombela
16:15	Try: Claude Tshidibi 18'; Brenden Olivier 38'; Kuhle Sonkosi 53'; Siviwe Soyizwapi 57'; Ivan Ludick 62'; Sphu Msutwana 66'; Siphesihle Punguzwa 72'; Dane van der Westhuyzen 79'; Con: Ruan Allerston 39', 54', 58' (3/4); Marlou van Niekerk 67' (1/2); Gavin Hauptfleisch 80' (1/2); Pen: Ruan Allerston 10', 46', 51' (3/3); Drop: Ruan Allerston (0/1)	Scoreboard	Try: Conway Pretorius 77'; Con: Ashley Esau 78' (1/1); Pen: Ashley Esau 4', 7', 40', 49' (4/5); Cards: Conway Pretorius (yellow card) 24' to 34'; Ernst Claassen (yellow card) 58' to 68'; Thurlow Marsh (yellow card) 69'

== Promotion/relegation play-off ==
19 October 2013	Border U21	23–21	Eastern Province U21	Buffalo City Stadium, East London
13:00	Try: Ernst Ladendorf 5'; Marlyn Williams 13'; Dillon Smit 34'; Con: Shaun Nieuwenhuyzen 35' (1/3); Pen: Shaun Nieuwenhuyzen 2' (1/1); Angus Cleophas 83' (1/2); Cards: Stephan Deyzel (yellow card) 38' to 48'	Scoreboard	Try: Siphesihle Punguzwa 49'; Marlou van Niekerk 59'; Siviwe Soyizwapi 68'; Con: Ruan Allerston (0/1); Gavin Hauptfleisch (0/2); Pen: Ruan Allerston 28' (1/1); Gavin Hauptfleisch 66' (1/1); Marlou van Niekerk (0/1); Cards: Claude Tshidibi (yellow card) 47' to 58'	Attendance: 200

- Border U21 remain in Group A.
- Eastern Province U21 remain in Group B.

== See also ==
- 2013 Currie Cup Premier Division
- 2013 Currie Cup First Division
- 2013 Vodacom Cup
- 2013 Under-19 Provincial Championship
