= Dolph Botha =

- Full name: Philip Rudolph Botha
- Born: 15 January 1993 (age 33) Johannesburg, South Africa
- Height: 1.85 m (6 ft 1 in)
- Weight: 119 kg (18 st 10 lb; 262 lb)
- School: Grey College, Bloemfontein
- University: University of the Free State

Rugby union career
- Position: Prop
- Current team: Free State Cheetahs
Youth career
- 2009–2014: Free State Cheetahs
Amateur team(s)
Years	Team	Apps	(Points)
2014–2016	UFS Shimlas	11	(0)
Senior career
Years	Team	Apps	(Points)
2014	Free State Cheetahs	8	(0)
2015	Cheetahs	1	(0)
2018	San Diego Legion	6	(5)
2019	New England Free Jacks	5	(0)
2019–2020	Griffons		
2021–2022	VVA Podmoskovye		
2022–2023	Pamiers		
2023–	Free State Cheetahs		
- Correct as of 22 May 2018

Philip Rudolph Botha (born 15 January 1993 in Johannesburg, South Africa) is a South African rugby union player for the Griffons in the Currie Cup and the Rugby Challenge. His regular position is prop.

== Career ==
=== Youth and Varsity Cup rugby ===
He went to the well-known rugby school Grey College in Bloemfontein and was selected to represent local provincial side, the Free State Cheetahs, at several youth tournaments. He represented them at Under-16 level at the Grant Khomo Week in 2009 and was then included in their Under-18 squad for the premier youth tournament, the Craven Week in both 2010 and 2011, where he was mainly used as a substitute.

However, he impressed enough to be included in the Free State U19 squad later in 2011, where he made a number of appearances for them during the 2011 Under-19 Provincial Championship. He established himself as a first-choice player for the U19s during the 2012 Under-19 Provincial Championship, making eight appearances.

He progressed to the Free State U21 side and played nine matches for them during the 2013 Under-21 Provincial Championship, scoring three tries. He got his first taste of Varsity Cup rugby during the 2014 season, playing in three matches for Bloemfontein-based university side UFS Shimlas. In the second half of 2014, he returned to the Under-21s to play in the 2014 Under-21 Provincial Championship.

=== Free State Cheetahs ===
He was an unused member of the Free State Cheetahs squad for the 2013 Currie Cup Premier Division, but was once again named in their side for the 2014 Currie Cup Premier Division and was included in his first matchday squad when he was named on the bench for their Round Two match against Northern Cape side Griquas.
