= Tony Jantjies =

South African rugby union player

- Full name: Altonio Shedrick Jantjies
- Born: 19 April 1992 (age 34) Cape Town, South Africa
- Height: 1.80 m (5 ft 11 in)
- Weight: 94 kg (14 st 11 lb; 207 lb)
- School: Hoërskool Menlopark, Pretoria
- Notable relative: Elton Jantjies (brother)

Rugby union career
- Position: Fly-half
- Current team: Alcobendas
Youth career
- 2008: Golden Lions
- 2009–2013: Blue Bulls
Senior career
Years	Team	Apps	(Points)
2012–2014	Blue Bulls	20	(180)
2015	Eastern Province Kings	2	(0)
2016–2018	Blue Bulls	11	(64)
2016–2018	Blue Bulls XV	16	(97)
2017	Bulls	5	(4)
2019–present	Alcobendas	0	(0)
- Correct as of 28 October 2018
International career
Years	Team	Apps	(Points)
2008	South Africa Elite Squad		
2009	South Africa Schools		
2012	South Africa Under-20	3	(19)
- Correct as of 13 April 2018

Altonio "Tony" Shedrick Jantjies (born 19 April 1992) is a professional South African rugby union player for Alcobendas in the División de Honor in Spain. His regular position is fly-half.

== Career ==
=== Youth ===
Jantjies represented the Golden Lions at the 2008 Under-16 Grant Khomo Week tournament, which led to his inclusion in the Under-16 Elite Squad.

Jantjies then joined near neighbours the Blue Bulls from the 2009 season. He played for them at the 2009 and 2010 Under-18 Craven Week competitions, earning a spot in the S.A. Schools side in 2009. He then played for the Blue Bulls U19 team in the 2010 and 2011 Under-19 Provincial Championship competitions and for the Blue Bulls U21 team in 2012 and 2013.

Jantjies was included in the South Africa Under-20 squad for the 2012 IRB Junior World Championship competition. He started the first game of the competition, kicking four penalties and a conversion in South Africa's 19–23 defeat to Ireland, Handré Pollard was preferred to him for the remainder of the competition, but Jantjies did play in two matches against Italy and Argentina, and was an unused substitute in the final against New Zealand.

=== Blue Bulls ===
Jantjies made his first class debut for the Blue Bulls in their opening match of the 2012 Vodacom Cup competition, coming on as a second-half substitute against Griquas. He made his first start in the same competition two weeks later, against former side the Golden Lions. He also scored his first points during that game, scoring a try and kicking five conversions and three penalties to get a personal haul of 24 points in the Blue Bulls' 49–10 victory. He made five appearances in total in that competition, scoring 43 points.

Jantjies made a further five appearances for the Blue Bulls in the 2013 Vodacom Cup competition, scoring 79 points to finish as the fifth top points scorer in that competition.

His Currie Cup debut came later in the same year, when he was included in the Blue Bulls starting team to face Western Province in the opening match of the 2013 Currie Cup Premier Division season.

=== Eastern Province Kings ===
Jantjies joined Port Elizabeth-based side Eastern Province Kings for the 2015 season. He made just two appearances for the Kings during the 2015 Vodacom Cup competition before his contract was terminated on 24 June 2015 following a breach of team protocol.

=== Alcobendas ===
Jantjies moved to Spanish side Alcobendas in December 2018.

== Personal life ==
Jantjies is the younger brother of Springbok fly-half Elton Jantjies.
