= Dries Swanepoel =

South African rugby union player

- Full name: Andries Ebenaezer Swanepoel
- Born: 19 February 1993 (age 33) Delareyville, South Africa
- Height: 1.84 m (6 ft 1/2 in)
- Weight: 97 kg (15 st 4 lb; 214 lb)
- School: Grey College, Bloemfontein
- University: University of Pretoria

Rugby union career
- Position: Centre
- Current team: Cheetahs / Free State Cheetahs
Youth career
- 2005–2006: Leopards
- 2009–2011: Free State
- 2012–2013: Blue Bulls
Amateur team(s)
Years	Team	Apps	(Points)
2014–2016	UP Tuks	11	(40)
Senior career
Years	Team	Apps	(Points)
2013–2018	Blue Bulls	30	(55)
2016–2018	Bulls	11	(10)
2016–2018	Blue Bulls XV	8	(10)
2018–2021	Free State Cheetahs	14	(10)
2019–2021	Cheetahs	11	(5)
2021-2023	AS Béziers	16	(7)
2023-	AS Bédarrides		
- Correct as of 18 October 2023
International career
Years	Team	Apps	(Points)
2011	South Africa Schools	1	(0)
2013	South Africa Under-20	4	(5)
- Correct as of 29 April 2014

Andries Ebenaezer Swanepoel (born 19 February 1993) is a South African rugby union player for AS Bédarrides in the French amateur Nationale 2. His regular position is centre.

== Career ==
=== Youth ===
Swanepoel played for the Leopards at primary school level, representing them at the 2005 and 2006 Under-13 Craven Week competitions. He then went to Grey College in Bloemfontein, where he played schoolboy rugby next to future Springbok Jan Serfontein He represented the Free State Cheetahs at Under-16 level at the 2009 Grant Khomo Week and at Under-18 level at the 2011 Craven Week. This led to his inclusion in the South African Schools side in 2011, where he also acted as vice-captain.

In 2012, he moved to Pretoria to join the Blue Bulls. He made four starts for them in the 2012 Under-19 Provincial Championship competition, scoring three tries. In 2013, he earned a call-up to the South Africa Under-20 side that played in the 2013 IRB Junior World Championship. After making substitute appearances against the United States and England, he started the final pool match against France – scoring a first-minute try to help them top their pool – and the semi-final loss to Wales.

He returned to domestic action at the end of the year, scoring five tries in fourteen appearances for the Blue Bulls U21 side in the 2013 Under-21 Provincial Championship. He scored a try in the final, but it wasn't enough to help the Blue Bulls secure the title, losing 30–23 to Western Province U21.

He played for university side UP Tuks during the 2014 Varsity Cup, scoring six tries in six starts.

=== Blue Bulls ===
Swanepoel's first class debut came in the 2013 Vodacom Cup competition. He started in their match against Griquas in Kimberley It took him just eleven minutes to score his first senior try, setting Blue Bulls on their way to a 40–32 win. He made a further five appearances in the competition, scoring a total of six tries, the joint seventh-highest in the competition.

=== Cheetahs ===
In July 2018, Swanepoel returned to the Cheetahs prior to the 2018–19 Pro14, signing a two-year deal with the Bloemfontein-based side.
