= Travis Ismaiel =

South African rugby union player

- Full name: Travis Keenan Ismaiel
- Born: 2 June 1992 (age 34) Cape Town, South Africa
- Height: 1.90 m (6 ft 3 in)
- Weight: 94 kg (14 st 11 lb; 207 lb)
- School: Tygerberg High School, Parow
- University: University of Pretoria

Rugby union career
- Position: Winger
Youth career
- 2011–2013: Blue Bulls
Amateur team(s)
Years	Team	Apps	(Points)
2013	UP Tuks	0	(0)
Senior career
Years	Team	Apps	(Points)
2012–2017	Blue Bulls	42	(110)
2014–2018	Bulls	39	(50)
2019	Blue Bulls XV	5	(20)
2019–2020	Harlequins	7	(0)
2020–2021	Bulls	5	(0)
2020–2021	Blue Bulls	1	(0)
- Correct as of 13 September 2021
International career
Years	Team	Apps	(Points)
2012	South Africa Under-20	1	(0)
2016	South Africa 'A'	2	(0)
2018	South Africa	1	(5)
- Correct as of 3 June 2018

Travis Keenan Ismaiel (born 2 June 1992 in Cape Town) is a South African rugby union player for the Bulls in Super Rugby. His regular position is winger.

== Career ==
=== Youth ===
He played for the Blue Bulls U19 team in the 2011 Under-19 Provincial Championship competition and for the Blue Bulls U21 team in 2012 and 2013.

He was included in the South Africa Under-20 squad for the 2012 IRB Junior World Championship competition and made one appearance for them, in their pool stage match against Italy. He was also an unused substitute in the final against New Zealand.

=== Blue Bulls ===
He made his first class debut for the Blue Bulls in their opening match of the 2013 Vodacom Cup competition, starting their match against Griquas. He scored his first senior try a week later, when he dotted down in the 78th minute against the Pumas. He made seven appearances in total in that competition, scoring six tries.

His Currie Cup debut came later in the same year, when he was included in the Blue Bulls starting team to face Western Province in the opening match of the 2013 Currie Cup Premier Division season.

=== South Africa 'A' ===
In 2016, Ismaiel was included in a South Africa 'A' squad that played a two-match series against a touring England Saxons team. He was named in the starting line-up for their first match in Bloemfontein, but ended on the losing side as the visitors ran out 32–24 winners. He was named on the bench for the second match of the series, coming on as a second-half replacement in a 26–29 defeat to the Saxons in George.

=== Harlequins ===
On 2 July 2019, it was announced that Ismael would sign for English Premiership Harlequins.

=== Return to Bulls ===
On 27 May 2020, Ismaiel returned to his Super Rugby side Bulls later in 2020, after his short stint in England.
