= Johan Meyer (rugby union) =

Italy international rugby union player

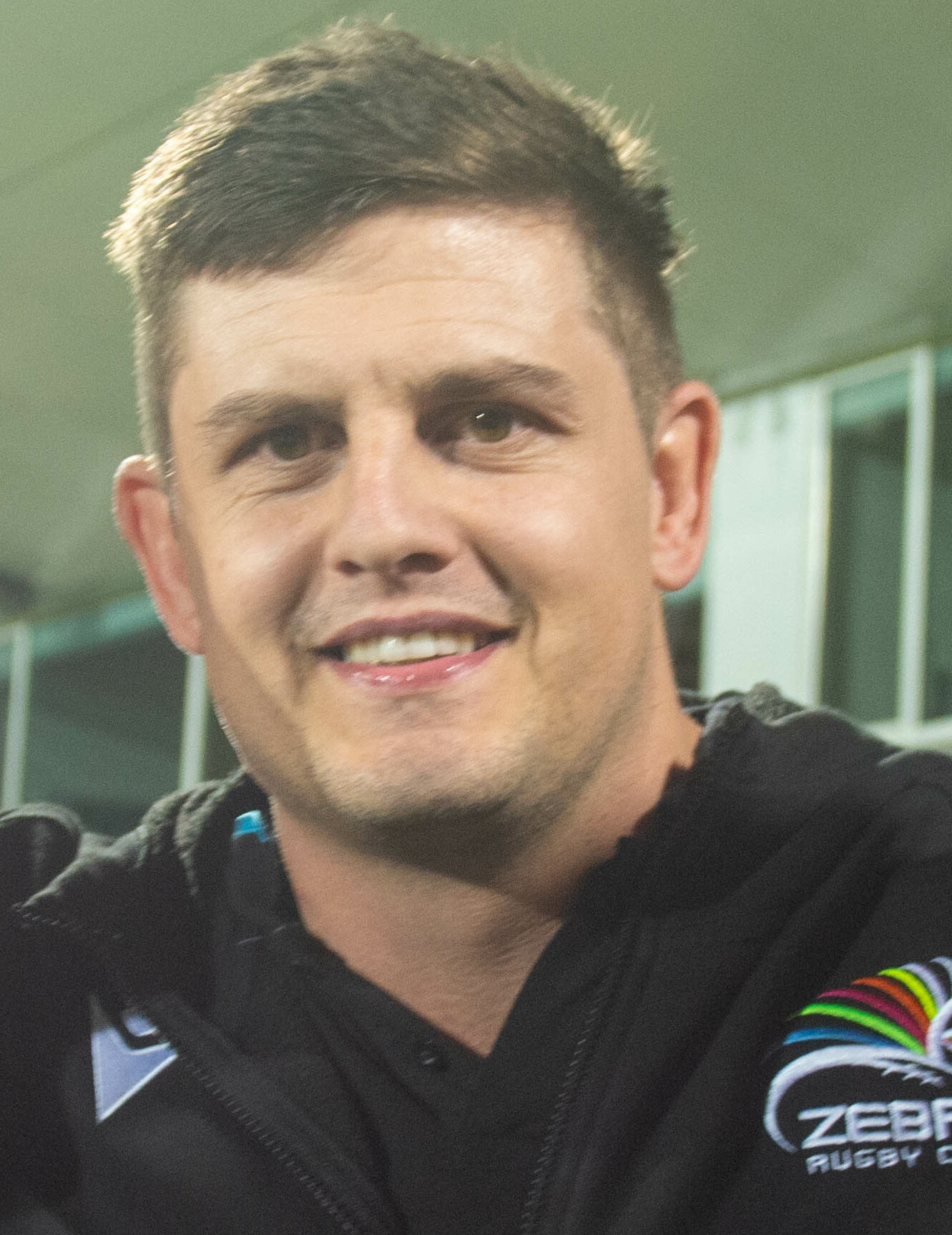
- Full name: Johan Gert Meyer
- Born: 26 February 1993 (age 33) Port Elizabeth, South Africa
- Height: 1.93 m (6 ft 4 in)
- Weight: 104 kg (16 st 5 lb; 229 lb)
- School: Queen's College, Queenstown

Rugby union career
- Position: Flanker / Number eight
Youth career
- 2006–2011: Border Bulldogs
- 2012–2014: Sharks
Senior career
Years	Team	Apps	(Points)
2013–2015	Sharks (Currie Cup)	25	(15)
2015–2023	Zebre	100	(90)
- Correct as of 23 Jan 2021
International career
Years	Team	Apps	(Points)
2018–2021	Italy	14	(10)
- Correct as of 7 May 2021

Johan Gert Meyer (born 26 February 1993 in Port Elizabeth, South Africa) is a retired South African born rugby union player, who played with Italian side Zebre in the Pro14 and European Rugby Challenge Cup, and for the Italian national team after qualifying through residency. His regular position was flanker or number eight.

== Youth ==
Meyer represented Eastern Cape side the Border Bulldogs at several youth tournaments. In 2006, he played for their Under-13 side at the Craven Week competition. He played for them at two Under-18 Craven Week competitions – in 2010 and again in 2011, when he scored three tries for the Border U18 side, including two in their match against Griquas Country Districts.

After school, Meyer moved to Durban where he joined the Sharks Academy. He was a member of the Sharks U19 squad that played in the 2012 Under-19 Provincial Championship (although he never played for them) and the Sharks U21 squads in 2013 and 2014.

== Sharks ==
Meyer made his first class debut during the 2013 Vodacom Cup competition, making his first of 5 appearances off the bench in the Sharks XV's 72–6 victory over his former side the Border Bulldogs in Durban.

He was once again involved in the Sharks XV 2014 Vodacom Cup campaign, this time appearing in all eight of their matches; four times in the run-on side and four times off the bench. His first start came in their Round Three match against the Free State XV in Bloemfontein and two weeks later he scored his first senior try in their match against the Boland Cavaliers in Ceres to help the Sharks XV to a 43–27 win. He scored another try in their match against Kenyan invitational side Simba XV in a 40–3 victory in Cape Town and another in the quarter-final, which wasn't enough to see the Sharks XV lose 27–20 to eventual losing finalists the Golden Lions to be eliminated from the competition.

Meyer was then named in the Sharks squad for the 2014 Currie Cup Premier Division competition and named on the bench for their Round Two match against the Pumas.

== Zebre ==
Meyer joined Italian Pro12 side Zebre for the 2015–16 Pro12 season. He played 17 games, starting 16, playing 1269 minutes, scoring 3 tries contributing 15-point in the Pro 12 series. He played 5 games in the European Rugby Challenge Cup contributing 5 points. On the 23rd of March 2023 Mayer announced that he will retire from professional rugby at the end of the 2022-2023 season for the consequences of a critical injury.

== International ==
He has represented Italy on 14 occasions, with 2 tries, from 2018 to 2021, qualifying on residency grounds.
