= Sean Robinson (rugby union, born 1993) =

South African rugby union player

- Full name: Sean Jack Robinson
- Born: 2 November 1993 (age 33) Pretoria, South Africa
- Height: 1.81 m (5 ft 11 1/2 in)
- Weight: 90 kg (198 lb)
- School: Hoërskool Waterkloof

Rugby union career
- Position: Full-back / Wing
- Current team: Bayonne
Youth career
- 2009–2011: Blue Bulls
Senior career
Years	Team	Apps	(Points)
2013–2014	Sharks (Currie Cup)	5	(5)
2013–2014	Sharks	3	(0)
2014–2017	Racing 92	11	(0)
2017–	Bayonne	36	(45)
- Correct as of 3 May 2014
International career
Years	Team	Apps	(Points)
2011	S.A. Schools		
- Correct as of 10 April 2013

Sean Jack Robinson (born 2 November 1993) is a South African rugby union player, currently playing with French Pro D2 side Bayonne. His regular position is full-back or winger.

== Career ==
=== Early career ===
He represented Blue Bulls between 2009 and 2011 at various youth weeks. He then joined the Sharks in 2012, scoring 30 points in his 13 appearances in the 2012 Under-19 Provincial Championship competition.

=== Sharks ===
He was included in the Sharks senior squad for the 2013 Vodacom Cup competition and made his first class debut on 5 April 2013 in their Vodacom Cup match against the SWD Eagles, scoring the winning try in the 70th minute of the game.

Five days later, he was named in the starting line-up for the Sharks for their Super Rugby game against the Stormers.

=== Racing 92 ===
On 5 November 2016, Robinson made move to France to sign for Top 14 club Racing 92 as a medical joker during the 2016-17 season.

=== Bayonne ===
On 1 June 2017, Robinson signs a permanent contract with Bayonne to compete in the French second division Pro D2 from the 2017-18 season.
