= Irné Herbst =

South African rugby union player (born 1993)

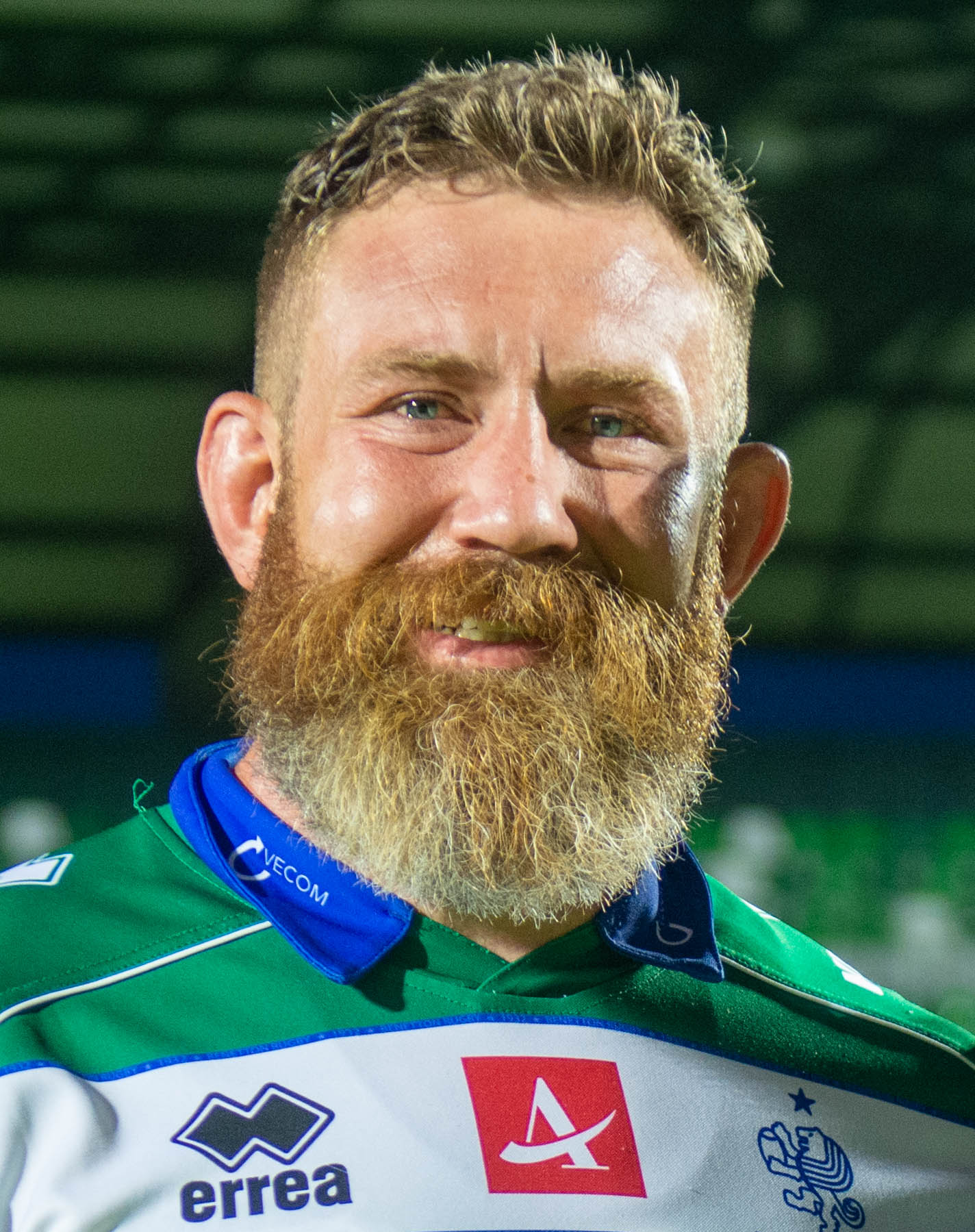
- Herbst in 2022
- Full name: Irné Philip Herbst
- Born: 4 May 1993 (age 33) Witbank, South Africa
- Height: 1.96 m (6 ft 5 in)
- Weight: 117 kg (258 lb; 18 st 6 lb)
- School: Hoërskool Waterkloof, Pretoria

Rugby union career
- Position: Lock
- Current team: Harlequins
Youth career
- 2006: Mpumalanga
- 2011–2014: Blue Bulls
Senior career
Years	Team	Apps	(Points)
2014–2015	UP Tuks	11	(0)
2016	Blue Bulls XV	1	(0)
2016–2017	Blue Bulls	6	(0)
2017	Southern Kings	13	(0)
2017−2022	Benetton	78	(10)
2022−	Harlequins	61	(10)
- Correct as of 18 March 2025
International career
Years	Team	Apps	(Points)
2011	South Africa Schools	1	(0)
2013	South Africa Under-20s	5	(5)
- Correct as of 31 January 2024

Irné Philip Herbst (born 4 May 1993) is a South African rugby union player, currently playing with English team Harlequins in the Premiership Rugby. His regular position is lock.

== Rugby career ==
=== Schoolboy rugby ===
Herbst was born in Witbank and earned a call-up to represent Mpumalanga at primary school level at the Under-13 Craven Week in 2006. At high school level, he attended Hoërskool Waterkloof in Pretoria, where he was chosen to represent the Blue Bulls at the Under-18 Craven Week in 2011. He was included in a South Africa Schools squad that beat their counterparts from France 21–14 in August 2011.

=== Youth and Varsity Cup rugby ===
After high school, he joined the Blue Bulls academy, making nine appearances for a Blue Bulls U19 side that reached the final of the 2012 Under-19 Provincial Championship, where they lost to Western Province U19.

He was selected in the South Africa Under-20 squad that played in the 2013 IRB Junior World Championship held in France. He started all five of their matches in the tournament, scoring a try in their semi-final defeat to Wales, a result which eliminated South Africa from the competition, eventually finishing third after beating New Zealand in their final match.

Herbst returned to domestic action in South Africa by making twelve appearances for the Blue Bulls U21 team in the 2013 Under-21 Provincial Championship. He scored one try in their defeat to Western Province U21 as his side reached the final, where they lost to the same opposition.

He played in the 2014 Varsity Cup competition for Pretoria-based university side UP Tuks, making four appearances, and then made a further eleven starts for the Blue Bulls U21s in the 2013 edition of the Under-21 Provincial Championship. In a repeat of the 2013 final, they again faced Western Province, but turned the tables on this occasion, winning the match 20–10 to be crowned champions.

Herbst's 2015 season again started with him representing UP Tuks in the Varsity Cup, where he made seven starts. He was also named in a Varsity Cup Dream Team at the conclusion of the tournament and played in their match against the South Africa Under-20 squad as they prepared for the 2015 World Rugby Under 20 Championship. However, he then suffered a knee injury that kept him out for the entire season.

He made his return in 2016, making his domestic first class debut in the Blue Bulls defeat to Western Province in the 2016 Currie Cup qualification series.

==== Benetton ====
In 2017 Herbst signed for Italian team Benetton. He played in Italy until 2021−22 season.

==== Harlequins ====
On 5 May 2022, Herbst moved to England to join Harlequins in the Premiership Rugby ahead of the 2022-23 season. He made his debut in the opening round of the following season during a 40–31 victory over Newcastle Falcons.

In December 2023, he scored his first two tries for the club in the same game during defeat to Toulouse in the group stages of the 2023–2024 Champions Cup. In March 2024, he controversially only served 7 minutes of a 10 minute sin-bin due to an officiating error during a 40–36 victory over Bath Rugby. Despite making an important tackle during the period of play where he had returned to the pitch early, the result was not overturned. The referees representative body for the RFU was forced to apologise following a complaint from Bath Head Coach Johann van Graan.

In March 2025, Harlequins announced that he would be leaving the club at the end of the season to join French Top 14 side CA Brive.
