= Patrick Howard (rugby union) =

South African rugby union player (born 1992)

- Full name: Patrick Benjamin Howard
- Born: 27 March 1992 (age 34) Pietermaritzburg, South Africa
- Height: 1.87 m (6 ft 1 1/2 in)
- Weight: 100 kg (15 st 10 lb; 220 lb)
- School: Michaelhouse, KwaZulu-Natal

Rugby union career
- Position: Centre / Winger
- Current team: Ealing Trailfinders
Youth career
- 2005–2010: Sharks
- 2011–2012: Western Province
Senior career
Years	Team	Apps	(Points)
2012–2015	Western Province	26	(25)
2014–2015	→ Munster	9	(5)
2015	Stormers	2	(0)
2015–2016	Northampton Saints	0	(0)
2016–2018	Dragons	35	(40)
2018–	Ealing Trailfinders		
- Correct as of 25 January 2018
International career
Years	Team	Apps	(Points)
2012	South Africa Under-20	3	(5)
- Correct as of 26 October 2013

Patrick Benjamin Howard (born 27 March 1992) is a South African rugby union player who is currently playing for Ealing Trailinfders in the RFU Championship. He previously played for Welsh United Rugby Championship side Dragons, Western Province in the Currie Cup and Vodacom Cup, Stormers in Super Rugby and Irish province Munster. His usual position is centre or winger.

== Career ==
=== Youth ===
In 2005, at primary school level, Howard was selected to represent his local provincial side KwaZulu-Natal at the Under–13 Craven Week tournament. He also represented them at the Under-18 Craven Week competitions in both 2009 and 2010. In 2010, he also secured inclusion in a South African Under-18 High Performance squad that played matches against France, Namibia and England.

After finishing high school, Howard moved to Cape Town to join the Western Province for the 2011 season. He was a key member of the Western Province U19 side that reached the semi-finals of the 2011 Under-19 Provincial Championship, starting in twelve of their thirteen matches and scoring seven tries, which included a hat-trick in their match against SWD U19.

In 2012, Howard was named in the South Africa Under–20 side that participated in the 2012 IRB Junior World Championship on home soil. He started the first match of the competition at outside centre, but was on the losing side as they suffered a 19–23 defeat to Ireland. He came on as a substitute in their next pool match against Italy, scoring a try in injury time at the end of the match to help South Africa to a convincing 52–3 victory. He started their final match in the pool stages against England on the left wing and played the entire 80 minutes as his side achieved a 28–15 victory to qualify for the semi-finals. An untimely hamstring injury ruled Howard out of the remainder of the tournament, with his side going on to win the competition for the first time, beating New Zealand 22–16 in the final.

He returned to provincial action in August 2012, representing the Western Province U21s in the 2012 Under-21 Provincial Championship. He scored five tries in eight appearances – two of those in their semi-final match against his local side the Sharks U21 in Durban – as Western Province reached the final, only to lose to the Blue Bulls U21 side.

=== Western Province ===
During the 2012 Currie Cup Premier Division, Howard was included in the Western Province squad. Despite not having played Vodacom Cup rugby (the traditional pathway for players), he made his first class and Currie Cup debut in their Round Five match against the Free State Cheetahs in Bloemfontein, playing off the bench just after the hour mark, with a second appearance against the Blue Bulls in Pretoria.

He made his Vodacom Cup debut in 2013 and started all nine of their matches during the competition as they reached the semi-finals before being eliminated by the Golden Lions in a 44–25 defeat in Johannesburg. Howard scored his first and second senior tries during the competition – both in their Round Five match against 2011 winners, Argentine side Pampas XV. Like the previous season, he once again got limited playing time in the 2013 Currie Cup Premier Division, appearing in just two matches – a 24–24 draw against the Blue Bulls which saw Howard scored his first Currie Cup try and a 15–14 victory over the Free State Cheetahs a week later. He reverted to the Western Province U21 side for the remainder of 2013, scoring six tries in the 2013 Under-21 Provincial Championship, which included braces in consecutive weeks in their matches against Border U21 and Golden Lions U21, as well as a try in the final of the competition to help them beat the Blue Bulls 30–23 in Cape Town.

He didn't play in the 2014 Vodacom Cup, suffering with a hamstring injury, but returned to action for them in their matches against Kenya and Namibia in June 2014. He played in six matches during the 2014 Currie Cup Premier Division season, scoring the first points of the season for Western Province as they ran out 35–16 winners against the Eastern Province Kings in Port Elizabeth in their opening match, and scoring a further try in their final group match of the season against the Sharks. He didn't feature in the play-offs as Western Province won their 33rd Currie Cup title, beating the Golden Lions 19–16 in the final.

=== Munster ===
During the South African off-season, he joined Irish side Munster on a three-month contract as injury cover during the 2014–15 season. He made his debut for Munster by coming on as a late replacement during their 38–12 victory over Welsh side Newport Gwent Dragons in Round Eight of the Pro12 season. He made his first start for Munster in their next Pro12 match, a 21–20 victory over fellow Irish side Ulster. A week later, he made his debut in the 2014–15 European Rugby Champions Cup, playing the full 80 minutes in their home match against French outfit Clermont. He remained involved in first team action until the end of January, making a total of six appearances in the Pro12 competition and three in the European Rugby Champions Cup. His final match was Munster's final match in Pool 1 of the Champions Cup against Premiership side Sale Sharks. Despite only coming on during the second half of the match, he scored his first try in Munster colours to help them to a 65–10 victory. His short-term contract expired and he returned to South Africa in February 2015.

=== Northampton Saints ===
In April 2015, English Premiership side Northampton Saints announced that Howard would join them for the 2015–16 English Premiership season.

=== Dragons ===
Howard joined the Dragons for the 2016-17 season and he was released at the end of the 2017-18 season.

=== Ealing Trailfinders ===
On 9 March 2018, Packman returns to England to join the RFU Championship side Ealing Trailfinders ahead of the 2018-19 season.
