= Siphesihle Punguzwa =

South African rugby union player

- Full name: Siphesihle Qhamani Punguzwa
- Born: 21 May 1993 (age 33) Butterworth, South Africa
- Height: 1.78 m (5 ft 10 in)
- Weight: 87 kg (192 lb; 13 st 10 lb)
- School: Selborne College, East London

Rugby union career
- Position: Flanker
- Current team: Border Bulldogs
Youth career
- 2009–2011: Border Bulldogs
- 2013–2014: Eastern Province Kings
Amateur team(s)
Years	Team	Apps	(Points)
2016–2017	UFH Blues	14	(0)
Senior career
Years	Team	Apps	(Points)
2014–2018	Eastern Province Kings	8	(5)
2019–present	Border Bulldogs	3	(0)
- Correct as of 1 July 2019

Siphesihle Qhamani 'Pitsa' Punguzwa (born 21 May 1993 in Butterworth) is a South African rugby union player for the Border Bulldogs in the Currie Cup and in the Rugby Challenge. His regular position is flanker.

== Career ==
=== Youth ===
Punguzwa represented his home province of Border at both the 2009 Under-16 Grant Khomo Week and the 2011 Under-18 Craven Week tournaments. He then moved to Port Elizabeth to join the Eastern Province Kings. He played in all nine matches of the Eastern Province U21 side's 2013 Under-21 Provincial Championship Division B campaign, making five starts and four substitute appearances and scoring eight tries, the joint-highest by a forward in the competition. His try-scoring feats included braces against SWD U21 and Falcons U21. He also played in their promotion/relegation play-off match against former side Border U21, but, despite scoring yet another try in the match, could not help Eastern Province U21 gain promotion to Division A.

=== Senior career ===
Punguzwa was included in the Eastern Province Kings for the first time for the 2014 Vodacom Cup competition and made his senior debut by coming on as a substitute in their 17–10 opening day defeat to Kenyan side Simba XV. Three more substitute appearances followed – with Punguzwa scoring his first senior try for the Kings in their 28–21 victory over Boland Cavaliers – before he was named in the starting line-up for the first time for their match against the Sharks XV in Durban.
