= Buffalo City Stadium =

Stadium in East London, South Africa

- Interactive map of Buffalo City Stadium
- Full name: Buffalo City Municipality Stadium
- Former names: Absa Stadium; Basil Kenyon Stadium
- Location: Arcadia, East London
- Coordinates: 33°0′24″S 27°54′19″E
- Owner: Buffalo City Metropolitan Municipality
- Capacity: 16,000
- Surface: Grass

Construction
- Built: 1934
- Renovated: 2010

Tenants
- Chippa United (2023–present) (Premiership); Border Bulldogs (1934–present) (Currie Cup)

Buffalo City Stadium (also known as the BCM Stadium) is a multi-use stadium in East London, South Africa. It is currently used mostly for Rugby Union matches and is the home stadium of Border Bulldogs. The stadium holds 16,000 people.

The stadium has undergone three name changes. Originally, it was named Border Rugby Union Grounds, which was changed to the Basil Kenyon Stadium, after the Springbok player who captained the Springboks on a successful 3-month tour of England in 1951. It has also been called ABSA Stadium, for sponsorship reasons. On 26 June 2010, The BCM Stadium hosted a Test match between Italy and South Africa. South Africa won 55–11.

== Notable matches ==
In August 1978, 5,500 spectators at the stadium watched the South African Country Districts XV beat the touring American Cougars 44–12.

=== 1995 Rugby World Cup ===
The stadium was one of the host venues for the 1995 Rugby World Cup. It hosted 3 first round matches in Pool B during the tournament.

Date	Team #1	Result	Team #2	Round	Attendance
27 May 1995	Italy	18–42	Western Samoa	Group B	11,000
30 May 1995	Western Samoa	32–26	Argentina	Group B	11,000
4 June 1995	Argentina	25–31	Italy	Group B	11,000

== See also ==
- List of stadiums in South Africa
- List of African stadiums by capacity
