= 2011 Under-19 Provincial Championship =

- Champions: Golden Lions
- Runners-up: Blue Bulls

The 2011 ABSA Under-19 Provincial Championship was contested from 15 July to 29 October 2011. The tournament featured the Under-19 players from the fourteen provincial rugby unions in South Africa.

== Competition ==
=== Division A ===
There were seven participating teams in the 2011 ABSA Under-19 Provincial Championship Division A. These teams played each other twice over the course of the season, once at home and once away.

Teams received four points for a win and two points for a draw. Bonus points were awarded to teams that score 4 or more tries in a game, as well as to teams that lost a match by 7 points or less. Teams were ranked by points, then points difference (points scored less points conceded).

The top 4 teams qualified for the title play-offs. In the semi-finals, the team that finished first had home advantage against the team that finished fourth, while the team that finished second had home advantage against the team that finished third. The winners of these semi-finals played each other in the final, at the same venue as the 2011 Currie Cup Premier Division Final.

The bottom team in Division A played a play-off game at home against the winner of the Division B final for a place in Division A in 2012.

=== Division B ===
There were seven participating teams in the 2011 ABSA Under-19 Provincial Championship Division B. These teams played each other once over the course of the season, either at home or away.

Teams received four points for a win and two points for a draw. Bonus points were awarded to teams that score 4 or more tries in a game, as well as to teams that lost a match by 7 points or less. Teams were ranked by points, then points difference (points scored less points conceded).

The top 4 teams qualified for the title play-offs. In the semi-finals, the team that finished first had home advantage against the team that finished fourth, while the team that finished second had home advantage against the team that finished third. The winners of these semi-finals played each other in the final, at the same venue as the 2011 Currie Cup First Division Final

The winner of the final played a play-off game away from home against the bottom team in Division A for a place in Division A in 2012.

== Teams ==
Location of teams in 2011 ABSA Under-19 Provincial Championship
Division A
Division B

=== Team Listing ===
The following teams will take part in the 2011 ABSA Under-19 Provincial Championship competition:

Division A
Team	Stadium/s
Blue Bulls	Loftus Versfeld, Pretoria
Free State Cheetahs	Free State Stadium, Bloemfontein
Golden Lions	Coca-Cola Park, Johannesburg
Leopards	Profert Olën Park, Potchefstroom
Leopards	Royal Bafokeng Stadium, Phokeng
Sharks	Mr Price Kings Park, Durban
SWD Eagles	Outeniqua Park, George
Western Province	Newlands Stadium, Cape Town

Division B
Team	Stadium/s
Boland Cavaliers	Boland Stadium, Wellington
Border Bulldogs	Buffalo City Stadium, East London
Eastern Province Kings	EPRU Stadium, Port Elizabeth
Falcons	Barnard Stadium, Kempton Park
Griquas	Griqua Park, Kimberley
Griffons	North West Stadium, Welkom
Pumas	Mbombela Stadium, Mbombela
Pumas	Puma Stadium, Witbank

== Division A ==
=== Table ===
2011 Under-19 Provincial Championship Division A Table
	Team	Played	Won	Drawn	Lost	Points For	Points Against	Points Difference	Tries For	Tries Against	Try Bonus	Losing Bonus	Points
1	Blue Bulls	12	10	0	2	453	219	+234	55	22	8	2	50
2	Golden Lions	12	9	0	3	405	285	+120	55	31	6	0	42
3	Western Province	12	7	1	4	367	225	+142	43	23	5	1	36
4	Free State Cheetahs	12	6	0	6	286	232	+54	26	23	3	5	32
5	Sharks	12	5	1	6	268	249	+19	32	27	3	2	27
6	Leopards	12	4	0	8	311	337	-26	40	39	5	1	22
7	SWD Eagles	12	0	0	12	114	657	-543	13	99	0	0	0
The top 4 teams qualified for the semi-finals. The bottom team will play in a relegation play-off game. Points breakdown: *4 points for a win *2 points for a draw *1 bonus point for a loss by seven points or less *1 bonus point for scoring four or more tries in a match

=== Fixtures and results ===
- Fixtures are subject to change.
- All times are South African (GMT+2).

==== Regular season ====
===== Round one =====
2011-07-15	Golden Lions	64 – 13	SWD Eagles	Coca-Cola Park, Johannesburg
14:40		Report

2011-07-16	Free State Cheetahs	6 – 27	Leopards	Free State Stadium, Bloemfontein
11:00		Report

2011-07-16	Sharks	21 – 33	Blue Bulls	Mr Price Kings Park, Durban
13:00		Report

===== Round two =====
2011-07-22	Leopards	29 – 43	Western Province	Profert Olën Park, Potchefstroom
15:00		Report

2011-07-22	SWD Eagles	3 – 34	Sharks	Outeniqua Park, George
19:00		Report

2011-07-23	Blue Bulls	30 – 25	Free State Cheetahs	Loftus Versfeld, Pretoria
12:40		Report

===== Round three =====
2011-07-30	Western Province	19 – 12	Blue Bulls	Newlands Stadium, Cape Town
		Report

2011-07-30	Sharks	10 – 23	Free State Cheetahs	Mr Price Kings Park, Durban
11:00		Report

2011-07-30	Golden Lions	39 – 31	Leopards	Coca-Cola Park, Johannesburg
12:30		Report

===== Round four =====
2011-08-05	Leopards	50 – 5	SWD Eagles	Profert Olën Park, Potchefstroom
15:00		Report

2011-08-06	Free State Cheetahs	13 – 16	Western Province	Free State Stadium, Bloemfontein
11:00		Report

2011-08-06	Blue Bulls	43 – 24	Golden Lions	Loftus Versfeld, Pretoria
13:00		Report

===== Round Five =====
2011-08-12	Western Province	9 – 9	Sharks	Newlands Stadium, Cape Town
14:30		Report

2011-08-12	SWD Eagles	17 – 62	Blue Bulls	Outeniqua Park, George
17:00		Report

2011-08-13	Golden Lions	23 – 19	Free State Cheetahs	Coca-Cola Park, Johannesburg
14:30		Report

===== Round Six =====
2011-08-19	Western Province	40 – 22	Golden Lions	Newlands Stadium, Cape Town
14:20		Report

2011-08-19	Sharks	21 – 22	Leopards	Mr Price Kings Park, Durban
15:00		Report

2011-08-20	Free State Cheetahs	35 – 20	SWD Eagles	Free State Stadium, Bloemfontein
11:00		Report

===== Round Seven =====
2011-08-26	Leopards	27 – 45	Blue Bulls	Royal Bafokeng Stadium, Phokeng
15:00		Report

2011-08-26	SWD Eagles	10 – 67	Western Province	Outeniqua Park, George
19:00		Report

2011-08-27	Golden Lions	59 – 20	Sharks	Coca-Cola Park, Johannesburg
12:40		Report

===== Round Eight =====
2011-09-03	Leopards	25 – 26	Free State Cheetahs	Profert Olën Park, Potchefstroom
12:00		Report

2011-09-03	Blue Bulls	32 – 24	Sharks	Loftus Versfeld, Pretoria
12:40		Report

2011-09-03	SWD Eagles	0 – 41	Golden Lions	Outeniqua Park, George
15:45		Report

===== Round Nine =====
2011-09-10	Sharks	54 – 13	SWD Eagles	Mr Price Kings Park, Durban
11:00		Report

2011-09-10	Western Province	39 – 16	Leopards	Newlands Stadium, Cape Town
11:55		Report

2011-09-10	Free State Cheetahs	16 – 13	Blue Bulls	Free State Stadium, Bloemfontein
12:50		Report

===== Round Ten =====
2011-09-16	Leopards	20 – 28	Golden Lions	Profert Olën Park, Potchefstroom
15:00		Report

2011-09-17	Free State Cheetahs	9 – 12	Sharks	Free State Stadium, Bloemfontein
11:00		Report

2011-09-17	Blue Bulls	19 – 3	Western Province	Loftus Versfeld, Pretoria
13:00		Report

===== Round Eleven =====
2011-09-24	Golden Lions	25 – 37	Blue Bulls	Coca-Cola Park, Johannesburg
10:30		Report

2011-09-24	Western Province	25 – 38	Free State Cheetahs	Newlands Stadium, Cape Town
14:40		Report

2011-09-24	SWD Eagles	12 – 36	Leopards	Outeniqua Park, George
19:00		Report

===== Round Twelve =====
2011-09-30	Blue Bulls	82 – 3	SWD Eagles	Loftus Versfeld, Pretoria
15:15		Report

2011-10-01	Free State Cheetahs	20 – 26	Golden Lions	Free State Stadium, Bloemfontein
10:50		Report

2011-10-01	Sharks	13 – 10	Western Province	Mr Price Kings Park, Durban
13:00		Report

===== Round Thirteen =====
2011-10-08	Leopards	13 – 28	Sharks	Royal Bafokeng Stadium, Phokeng
12:00		Report

2011-10-08	Golden Lions	31 – 20	Western Province	Coca-Cola Park, Johannesburg
12:30		Report

2011-10-08	SWD Eagles	5 – 56	Free State Cheetahs	Outeniqua Park, George
15:00		Report

===== Round Fourteen =====
2011-10-14	Blue Bulls	45 – 15	Leopards	Loftus Versfeld, Pretoria
15:15		Report

2011-10-15	Western Province	76 – 13	SWD Eagles	Newlands Stadium, Cape Town
12:45		Report

2011-10-15	Sharks	22 – 23	Golden Lions	Mr Price Kings Park, Durban
15:00		Report

==== Play-off Games ====
===== Semi-finals =====
2011-10-21	Blue Bulls	48 – 13	Free State Cheetahs	Loftus Versfeld, Pretoria
15:00		Report

2011-10-22	Golden Lions	32 – 27	Western Province	Coca-Cola Park, Johannesburg
15:00		Report

===== Final =====
2011-10-29	Golden Lions	20 – 19	Blue Bulls	Coca-Cola Park, Johannesburg
12:30		Report

== Division B ==
=== Table ===
2011 Under-19 Provincial Championship Division B Table
	Team	Played	Won	Drawn	Lost	Points For	Points Against	Points Difference	Tries For	Tries Against	Try Bonus	Losing Bonus	Points
1	Griffons	6	5	1	0	188	110	+78	27	12	5	0	27
2	Border Bulldogs	6	4	0	2	187	118	+69	26	16	4	2	22
3	Pumas	6	4	0	2	180	162	+18	26	21	3	1	20
4	Falcons	6	3	1	2	201	205	-4	26	30	5	1	20
5	Boland Cavaliers	6	3	0	3	143	136	+7	18	20	1	2	15
6	Griquas	6	1	0	5	113	198	-85	16	27	2	1	7
7	Eastern Province Kings	6	0	0	6	114	197	-83	13	26	1	2	3
The top 4 teams qualify for the semi-finals. The title play-off winner play in a promotion play-off game. Points breakdown: *4 points for a win *2 points for a draw *1 bonus point for a loss by seven points or less *1 bonus point for scoring four or more tries in a match

=== Fixtures and results ===
- Fixtures are subject to change.
- All times are South African (GMT+2).

==== Regular season ====
===== Round one =====
2011-08-06	Griquas	22 – 41	Pumas	Griqua Park, Kimberley
15:10		Report

===== Round two =====
2011-08-12	Pumas	19 – 36	Griffons	Puma Stadium, Witbank
13:30		Report

===== Round three =====
2011-08-20	Pumas	36 – 29	Border Bulldogs	Puma Stadium, Witbank
13:30		Report

===== Round four =====
2011-08-26	Border Bulldogs	17 – 12	Boland Cavaliers	Buffalo City Stadium, East London
13:00		Report

2011-08-27	Griffons	45 – 10	Griquas	North West Stadium, Welkom
13:15		Report

2011-08-27	Falcons	43 – 34	Eastern Province Kings	Barnard Stadium, Kempton Park
13:40		Report

===== Round Five =====
2011-09-02	Eastern Province Kings	18 – 34	Border Bulldogs	Nelson Mandela Bay Stadium, Port Elizabeth
14:30		Report

2011-09-02	Pumas	41 – 34	Falcons	Mbombela Stadium, Mbombela
14:30		Report

2011-09-03	Boland Cavaliers	7 – 17	Griffons	Boland Stadium, Wellington
12:30		Report

===== Round Six =====
2011-09-09	Border Bulldogs	53 – 10	Falcons	Buffalo City Stadium, East London
13:00		Report

2011-09-10	Griffons	26 – 9	Eastern Province Kings	North West Stadium, Welkom
11:00		Report

2011-09-10	Griquas	22 – 23	Boland Cavaliers	Griqua Park, Kimberley
11:00		Report

===== Round Seven =====
2011-09-16	Eastern Province Kings	12 – 25	Griquas	Nelson Mandela Bay Stadium, Port Elizabeth
14:30		Report

2011-09-17	Boland Cavaliers	27 – 24	Pumas	Boland Stadium, Wellington
09:30		Report

2011-09-17	Falcons	32 – 32	Griffons	Barnard Stadium, Kempton Park
15:00		Report

===== Round Eight =====
2011-09-23	Boland Cavaliers	50 – 27	Eastern Province Kings	Boland Stadium, Wellington
12:30		Report

2011-09-24	Griffons	32 – 30	Border Bulldogs	North West Stadium, Welkom
11:00		Report

2011-09-24	Griquas	24 – 53	Falcons	Griqua Park, Kimberley
11:00		Report

===== Round Nine =====
2011-09-30	Border Bulldogs	24 – 10	Griquas	Buffalo City Stadium, East London
15:40		Report

2011-10-01	Eastern Province Kings	14 – 19	Pumas	Zwide Stadium, Ibhayi
13:00		Report

2011-10-01	Falcons	29 – 21	Boland Cavaliers	Barnard Stadium, Kempton Park
15:00		Report

==== Play-off Games ====
===== Semi-finals =====
2011-10-07	Border Bulldogs	35 – 33	Pumas	Buffalo City Stadium, East London
17:15		Report

2011-10-08	Griffons	36 – 13	Falcons	North West Stadium, Welkom
15:00		Report

===== Final =====
2011-10-14	Border Bulldogs	10 – 21	Griffons	Boland Stadium, Wellington
12:00		Report

== Promotion/relegation play-off ==
2011-10-22	SWD Eagles	18 – 14	Griffons	Outeniqua Park, George
15:00		Report

SWD Eagles remained in Division A. Griffons remained in Division B.

== See also ==
- 2011 Currie Cup Premier Division
- 2011 Currie Cup First Division
- 2011 Vodacom Cup
- 2011 Under-21 Provincial Championship
