= 2012 Under-19 Provincial Championship =

- Champions: Western Province

The 2012 ABSA Under-19 Provincial Championship was contested from 13 July to 27 October 2012 in South Africa. The tournament featured the Under-19 players from the fourteen Currie Cup unions.

== Competition ==
=== Division A ===
There were seven participating teams in the 2012 ABSA Under-19 Provincial Championship Division A. These teams played each other twice over the course of the season, once at home and once away.

Teams received four points for a win and two points for a draw. Bonus points were awarded to teams that scored 4 or more tries in a game, as well as to teams that lost a match by 7 points or less. Teams were ranked by points, then points difference (points scored less points conceded).

The top 4 teams qualified for the title play-offs. In the semi-finals, the team that finished first had home advantage against the team that finished fourth, while the team that finished second had home advantage against the team that finished third. The winners of these semi-finals played each other in the final, at the same venue as the 2012 Currie Cup Premier Division Final.

The bottom team in Division A played a play-off game at home against the winner of the Division B final for a place in Division A in 2013.

=== Division B ===
There were seven participating teams in the 2012 ABSA Under-19 Provincial Championship Division B. These teams played each other once over the course of the season, either at home or away.

Teams received four points for a win and two points for a draw. Bonus points were awarded to teams that score 4 or more tries in a game, as well as to teams that lost a match by 7 points or less. Teams were ranked by points, then points difference (points scored less points conceded).

The top 4 teams qualified for the title play-offs. In the semi-finals, the team that finished first had home advantage against the team that finished fourth, while the team that finished second had home advantage against the team that finished third. The winners of these semi-finals played each other in the final, at the same venue as the 2012 Currie Cup First Division Final.

The winner of the final played a play-off game away from home against the bottom team in Division A for a place in Division A in 2013.

== Teams ==
Location of teams in 2012 ABSA Under-19 Provincial Championship
Division A
Division B

=== Team Listing ===
The following teams took part in the 2012 ABSA Under-19 Provincial Championship competition:

Division A
| Team | Stadium/s |
| Blue Bulls | Loftus Versfeld, Pretoria |
| Free State Cheetahs | Free State Stadium, Bloemfontein |
| Golden Lions | Ellis Park Stadium, Johannesburg |
| Leopards | Olën Park, Potchefstroom |
| Sharks | Kings Park Stadium, Durban |
| SWD Eagles | Outeniqua Park, George |
| Western Province | Newlands Stadium, Cape Town |

Division B
| Team | Stadium/s |
| Boland Cavaliers | Boland Stadium, Wellington |
| Border Bulldogs | Buffalo City Stadium, East London |
| Eastern Province Kings | Nelson Mandela Bay Stadium, Port Elizabeth |
| Falcons | Barnard Stadium, Kempton Park |
| Griquas | Griqua Park, Kimberley |
| Griffons | North West Stadium, Welkom |
| Pumas | Mbombela Stadium, Mbombela |
| Pumas | Puma Stadium, Witbank |

== Division A ==
=== Table ===
2012 Under-19 Provincial Championship Division A table
| Pos | Team | Pld | W | D | L | PF | PA | PD | TF | TA | TB | LB | Pts | Qualification |
|---|---|---|---|---|---|---|---|---|---|---|---|---|---|---|
| 1 | Western Province | 12 | 10 | 0 | 2 | 365 | 221 | +144 | 48 | 23 | 8 | 2 | 50 | Semi-finals |
| 2 | Blue Bulls | 12 | 9 | 0 | 3 | 446 | 226 | +220 | 61 | 27 | 8 | 3 | 47 | Semi-finals |
| 3 | Sharks | 12 | 7 | 0 | 5 | 396 | 279 | +117 | 53 | 32 | 7 | 3 | 38 | Semi-finals |
| 4 | Golden Lions | 12 | 7 | 0 | 5 | 365 | 246 | +119 | 48 | 28 | 4 | 2 | 34 | Semi-finals |
| 5 | Leopards | 12 | 6 | 0 | 6 | 275 | 293 | −18 | 36 | 38 | 4 | 2 | 30 | |
| 6 | Free State Cheetahs | 12 | 3 | 0 | 9 | 364 | 360 | +4 | 45 | 46 | 5 | 3 | 20 | |
| 7 | SWD Eagles | 12 | 0 | 0 | 12 | 95 | 681 | −586 | 9 | 106 | 0 | 0 | 0 | Relegation play-off |

Rules for classification: 4 points for a win; 2 points for a draw; 1 bonus point for a loss by seven points or less; 1 bonus point for scoring four or more tries in a match.

=== Fixtures and results ===
- Fixtures are subject to change.
- All times are South African (GMT+2).

==== Regular season ====
===== Round one =====
| 13 July 2012 | SWD Eagles | 0–90 | Blue Bulls | Outeniqua Park, George |
| 17:15 | | Scoreboard | | Referee: Matt King |

| 14 July 2012 | Free State Cheetahs | 31–32 | Leopards | Shimla Park, Bloemfontein |
| 13:00 | | Scoreboard | | Referee: Tiaan Jonker |

| 14 July 2012 | Golden Lions | 13–23 | Western Province | UJ Stadium, Johannesburg |
| 15:00 | | Scoreboard | | Referee: Lusanda Jam |

Bye/s: Sharks

===== Round two =====
| 20 July 2012 | Blue Bulls | 39–25 | Golden Lions | Loftus Versfeld, Pretoria |
| 15:00 | | Scoreboard | | Referee: Dilbert November |

| 20 July 2012 | Sharks | 38–16 | Free State Cheetahs | Kings Park Stadium, Durban |
| 16:30 | | Scoreboard | | Referee: Rodney Boneparte |

| 21 July 2012 | Leopards | 32–0 | SWD Eagles | Olën Park, Potchefstroom |
| 11:00 | | Scoreboard | | Referee: Cwengile Jadezweni |

Bye/s: Western Province

===== Round three =====
| 27 July 2012 | SWD Eagles | 3–46 | Sharks | Outeniqua Park, George |
| 17:15 | | Scoreboard | | Referee: Lusanda Jam |

| 28 July 2012 | Western Province | 20–16 | Blue Bulls | Newlands Stadium, Cape Town |
| 12:45 | | Scoreboard | | Referee: Rodney Boneparte |

| 28 July 2012 | Golden Lions | 43–15 | Leopards | Ellis Park Stadium, Johannesburg |
| 15:00 | | Scoreboard | | Referee: Jaco van Heerden |

Bye/s: Free State Cheetahs

===== Round four =====
| 3 August 2012 | Sharks | 28–29 | Golden Lions | Kings Park Stadium, Durban |
| 16:00 | | Scoreboard | | Referee: Pieter Janse van Vuuren |

| 4 August 2012 | Free State Cheetahs | 99–3 | SWD Eagles | Free State Stadium, Bloemfontein |
| 10:10 | | Scoreboard | | Referee: Archie Sehlako |

| 4 August 2012 | Leopards | 27–24 | Western Province | Olën Park, Potchefstroom |
| 11:00 | | Scoreboard | | Referee: Gerrie de Bruin |

Bye/s: Blue Bulls

===== Round Five =====
| 10 August 2012 | Blue Bulls | 13–8 | Leopards | Loftus Versfeld, Pretoria |
| 15:00 | | Scoreboard | | Referee: Cwengile Jadezweni |

| 11 August 2012 | Golden Lions | 25–21 | Free State Cheetahs | Ellis Park Stadium, Johannesburg |
| 13:00 | | Scoreboard | | Referee: Gerrie de Bruin |

| 11 August 2012 | Western Province | 16–6 | Sharks | Newlands Stadium, Cape Town |
| 14:55 | | Scoreboard | | Referee: Dilbert November |

Bye/s: SWD Eagles

===== Round Six =====
| 17 August 2012 | Free State Cheetahs | 31–40 | Western Province | Free State Stadium, Bloemfontein |
| 15:00 | | Scoreboard | | Referee: Lusanda Jam |

| 17 August 2012 | SWD Eagles | 5–46 | Golden Lions | Outeniqua Park, George |
| 15:00 | | Scoreboard | | Referee: Cwengile Jadezweni |

| 18 August 2012 | Sharks | 21–22 | Blue Bulls | Kings Park Stadium, Durban |
| 15:30 | | Scoreboard | | Referee: Pieter Janse van Vuuren |

Bye/s: Leopards

===== Round Seven =====
| 25 August 2012 | Leopards | 29–8 | Sharks | Olën Park, Potchefstroom |
| 11:00 | | Scoreboard | | Referee: Jaco van Heerden |

| 25 August 2012 | Western Province | 55–11 | SWD Eagles | Newlands Stadium, Cape Town |
| 14:00 | | Scoreboard | | Referee: Archie Sehlako |

| 25 August 2012 | Blue Bulls | 39–20 | Free State Cheetahs | Loftus Versfeld, Pretoria |
| 14:45 | | Scoreboard | | Referee: Matt Kemp |

Bye/s: Golden Lions

===== Round Eight =====
| 31 August 2012 | Blue Bulls | 60–13 | SWD Eagles | Loftus Versfeld, Pretoria |
| 15:00 | | Scoreboard | | Referee: Ricus van der Hoven |

| 1 September 2012 | Leopards | 15–29 | Free State Cheetahs | Olën Park, Potchefstroom |
| 11:00 | | Scoreboard | | Referee: François Groenewald |

| 1 September 2012 | Western Province | 27–18 | Golden Lions | Newlands Stadium, Cape Town |
| 14:30 | | Scoreboard | | Referee: Gerrie de Bruin |

Bye/s: Sharks

===== Round Nine =====
| 7 September 2012 | SWD Eagles | 23–41 | Leopards | Outeniqua Park, George |
| 15:30 | | Scoreboard | | Referee: Archie Sehlako |

| 8 September 2012 | Free State Cheetahs | 31–40 | Sharks | Free State Stadium, Bloemfontein |
| 13:00 | | Scoreboard | | Referee: Cwengile Jadezweni |

| 8 September 2012 | Golden Lions | 18–22 | Blue Bulls | Ellis Park Stadium, Johannesburg |
| 15:00 | | Scoreboard | | Referee: Rodney Boneparte |

Bye/s: Western Province

===== Round Ten =====
| 14 September 2012 | Blue Bulls | 35–38 | Western Province | Loftus Versfeld, Pretoria |
| 17:00 | | Scoreboard | | Referee: Matt Kemp |

| 14 September 2012 | Leopards | 11–7 | Golden Lions | Olën Park, Potchefstroom |
| 15:00 | | Scoreboard | | Referee: Mlungiseli Mdashe |

| 15 September 2012 | Sharks | 73–0 | SWD Eagles | Kings Park Stadium, Durban |
| 15:30 | | Scoreboard | | Referee: Rodney Boneparte |

Bye/s: Free State Cheetahs

===== Round Eleven =====
| 21 September 2012 | SWD Eagles | 21–29 | Free State Cheetahs | Outeniqua Park, George |
| 15:00 | | Scoreboard | | Referee: Rodney Boneparte |

| 22 September 2012 | Western Province | 39–8 | Leopards | Newlands Stadium, Cape Town |
| 10:45 | | Scoreboard | | Referee: Joey Salmans |

| 22 September 2012 | Golden Lions | 27–25 | Sharks | Ellis Park Stadium, Johannesburg |
| 14:45 | | Scoreboard | | Referee: Archie Sehlako |

Bye/s: Blue Bulls

===== Round Twelve =====
| 28 September 2012 | Leopards | 12–29 | Blue Bulls | Olën Park, Potchefstroom |
| 15:00 | | Scoreboard | | Referee: Rasta Rasivhenge |

| 28 September 2012 | Sharks | 28–25 | Western Province | Kings Park Stadium, Durban |
| 15:00 | | Scoreboard | | Referee: Jaco van Heerden |

| 29 September 2012 | Free State Cheetahs | 27–31 | Golden Lions | Free State Stadium, Bloemfontein |
| 10:00 | | Scoreboard | | Referee: Matt Kemp |

Bye/s: SWD Eagles

===== Round Thirteen =====
| 5 October 2012 | Blue Bulls | 36–37 | Sharks | Loftus Versfeld, Pretoria |
| 14:45 | | Scoreboard | | Referee: Pieter Janse van Vuuren |

| 5 October 2012 | Golden Lions | 83–3 | SWD Eagles | Ellis Park Stadium, Johannesburg |
| 15:00 | | Scoreboard | | Referee: Jaco van Heerden |

| 6 October 2012 | Western Province | 31–16 | Free State Cheetahs | Newlands Stadium, Cape Town |
| 14:00 | | Scoreboard | | Referee: Archie Sehlako |

Bye/s: Leopards

===== Round Fourteen =====
| 12 October 2012 | Sharks | 47–45 | Leopards | Kings Park Stadium, Durban |
| 15:00 | | Scoreboard | | Referee: Gerrie de Bruin |

| 12 October 2012 | SWD Eagles | 13–27 | Western Province | Outeniqua Park, George |
| 15:00 | | Scoreboard | | Referee: Jaco van Heerden |

| 13 October 2012 | Free State Cheetahs | 14–45 | Blue Bulls | Free State Stadium, Bloemfontein |
| 13:00 | | Scoreboard | | Referee: Cwengile Jadezweni |

Bye/s: Golden Lions

==== Play-off games ====
===== Semi-finals =====
| 20 October 2012 | Blue Bulls | 46–35 | Sharks | Loftus Versfeld, Pretoria |
| 15:00 | | Scoreboard | | Referee: Tiaan Jonker |

| 20 October 2012 | Western Province | 24–14 | Golden Lions | A.F. Markötter Stadium, Stellenbosch |
| 15:00 | | Scoreboard | | Referee: Archie Sehlako |

===== Final =====
| 27 October 2012 | Western Province | 22–18 | Blue Bulls | Kings Park Stadium, Durban |
| 12:00 | | Scoreboard | | Referee: Rasta Rasivhenge |

== Division B ==
=== Table ===
2012 Under-19 Provincial Championship Division B table
| Pos | Team | Pld | W | D | L | PF | PA | PD | TF | TA | TB | LB | Pts | Qualification |
|---|---|---|---|---|---|---|---|---|---|---|---|---|---|---|
| 1 | Eastern Province Kings | 6 | 5 | 0 | 1 | 194 | 120 | +74 | 29 | 15 | 5 | 0 | 25 | Semi-finals |
| 2 | Border Bulldogs | 6 | 4 | 0 | 2 | 225 | 151 | +74 | 31 | 19 | 5 | 1 | 22 | Semi-finals |
| 3 | Falcons | 6 | 4 | 0 | 2 | 191 | 165 | +26 | 25 | 21 | 4 | 1 | 21 | Semi-finals |
| 4 | Griquas | 6 | 4 | 0 | 2 | 163 | 183 | −20 | 17 | 26 | 2 | 0 | 18 | Semi-finals |
| 5 | Griffons | 6 | 3 | 0 | 3 | 163 | 175 | −12 | 21 | 25 | 4 | 1 | 17 | |
| 6 | Pumas | 6 | 1 | 0 | 5 | 105 | 193 | −88 | 16 | 24 | 1 | 2 | 7 | |
| 7 | Boland Cavaliers | 6 | 0 | 0 | 6 | 115 | 169 | −54 | 16 | 25 | 1 | 2 | 3 | |

Rules for classification: 4 points for a win; 2 points for a draw; 1 bonus point for a loss by seven points or less; 1 bonus point for scoring four or more tries in a match.
The title play-off winner play in a promotion play-off game.

=== Fixtures and results ===
- Fixtures are subject to change.
- All times are South African (GMT+2).

==== Regular season ====
===== Round one =====
| 17 August 2012 | Eastern Province Kings | 25–21 | Boland Cavaliers | Nelson Mandela Bay Stadium, Port Elizabeth |
| 14:45 | | Scoreboard | | Referee: Francois Pretorius |

| 17 August 2012 | Pumas | 27–32 | Griquas | Puma Stadium, Witbank |
| 15:00 | | Scoreboard | | Referee: Renier Vermeulen |

| 17 August 2012 | Griffons | 35–40 | Falcons | North West Stadium, Welkom |
| 16:45 | | Scoreboard | | Referee: Marlize Jordaan |

Bye/s: Border Bulldogs

===== Round two =====
| 24 August 2012 | Boland Cavaliers | 10–19 | Pumas | Boland Stadium, Wellington |
| 11:15 | | Scoreboard | | Referee: François Groenewald |

| 25 August 2012 | Griquas | 36–19 | Griffons | Griqua Park, Kimberley |
| 11:00 | | Scoreboard | | Referee: Stephan Geldenhuys |

| 25 August 2012 | Border Bulldogs | 37–12 | Eastern Province Kings | Buffalo City Stadium, East London |
| 15:00 | | Scoreboard | | Referee: Dilbert November |

Bye/s: Falcons

===== Round three =====
| 31 August 2012 | Boland Cavaliers | 17–21 | Griquas | Boland Stadium, Wellington |
| 14:30 | | Scoreboard | | Referee: Daniel Fortuin |

| 1 September 2012 | Pumas | 11–49 | Border Bulldogs | Mbombela Stadium, Mbombela |
| 11:00 | | Scoreboard | | Referee: Eduan Nel |

| 1 September 2012 | Falcons | 24–43 | Eastern Province Kings | Rus John Vorster Stadium |
| 13:30 | | Scoreboard | | Referee: Tahla Ntshakaza |

Bye/s: Griffons

===== Round four =====
| 7 September 2012 | Border Bulldogs | 50–20 | Griquas | Buffalo City Stadium, East London |
| 15:30 | | Scoreboard | | Referee: Tahla Ntshakaza |

| 8 September 2012 | Falcons | 21–14 | Pumas | Barnard Stadium, Kempton Park |
| 11:15 | | Scoreboard | | Referee: Roslyn Fortuin |

| 8 September 2012 | Griffons | 26–14 | Boland Cavaliers | North West Stadium, Welkom |
| 12:15 | | Scoreboard | | Referee: Marlize Jordaan |

Bye/s: Eastern Province Kings

===== Round Five =====
| 14 September 2012 | Eastern Province Kings | 33–13 | Griffons | Nelson Mandela Bay Stadium, Port Elizabeth |
| 15:00 | | Scoreboard | | Referee: Dilbert November |

| 15 September 2012 | Griquas | 44–39 | Falcons | Griqua Park, Kimberley |
| 10:30 | | Scoreboard | | Referee: Marlize Jordaan |

| 15 September 2012 | Boland Cavaliers | 36–44 | Border Bulldogs | Boland Stadium, Wellington |
| 12:15 | | Scoreboard | | Referee: Daniel Fortuin |

Bye/s: Pumas

===== Round Six =====
| 21 September 2012 | Eastern Province Kings | 50–15 | Pumas | Nelson Mandela Bay Stadium, Port Elizabeth |
| 14:45 | | Scoreboard | | Referee: Oregopotse Rametsi |

| 22 September 2012 | Falcons | 34–17 | Boland Cavaliers | Barnard Stadium, Kempton Park |
| 10:45 | | Scoreboard | | Referee: Renier Vermeulen |

| 22 September 2012 | Griffons | 39–33 | Border Bulldogs | North West Stadium, Welkom |
| 12:00 | | Scoreboard | | Referee: Pieter Janse van Vuuren |

Bye/s: Griquas

===== Round Seven =====
| 28 September 2012 | Pumas | 19–31 | Griffons | Puma Stadium, Witbank |
| 13:00 | | Scoreboard | | Referee: François Groenewald |

| 29 September 2012 | Border Bulldogs | 12–33 | Falcons | Buffalo City Stadium, East London |
| 14:00 | | Scoreboard | | Referee: Rodney Boneparte |

| 29 September 2012 | Griquas | 10–31 | Eastern Province Kings | Griqua Park, Kimberley |
| 14:00 | | Scoreboard | | Referee: Stephan Geldenhuys |

Bye/s: Boland Cavaliers

==== Play-off games ====
===== Semi-finals =====
| 5 October 2012 | Eastern Province Kings | 27–16 | Griquas | Nelson Mandela Bay Stadium, Port Elizabeth |
| 14:30 | | Scoreboard | | Referee: Ricus van der Hoven |

| 6 October 2012 | Border Bulldogs | 34–12 | Falcons | Buffalo City Stadium, East London |
| 11:00 | | Scoreboard | | Referee: Oregopotse Rametsi |

===== Final =====
| 13 October 2012 | Eastern Province Kings | 17–34 | Border Bulldogs | Nelson Mandela Bay Stadium, Port Elizabeth |
| 10:00 | | Scoreboard | | Referee: Jaco Kotze |

== Promotion/relegation play-off ==
| 20 October 2012 | SWD Eagles | 16–22 | Border Bulldogs | Outeniqua Park, George |
| 11:00 | | Scoreboard | | Referee: Gerrie de Bruin |

- Border Bulldogs are promoted to Division A.
- SWD Eagles are relegated to Division B.

== See also ==
- 2012 Currie Cup Premier Division
- 2012 Currie Cup First Division
- 2012 Vodacom Cup
- 2012 Under-21 Provincial Championship
