= 2019 Stormers season =

Stormers
- 2019 season
- Head coach: Robbie Fleck
- Captain: Siya Kolisi
- Stadium: DHL Newlands, Cape Town
- Overall: 10th
- South African Conference: 5th
- Record: Won 7, Drew 1, Lost 8
- Top try scorer: All: Herschel Jantjies (5)
- Top points scorer: All: Jean-Luc du Plessis (61)

In 2019, the Stormers participated in the 2019 Super Rugby competition, the 24th edition of the competition since its inception in 1996. They were included in the South African Conference of the competition, along with the Bulls, Jaguares, Lions and Sharks.

The Stormers won seven, drew one and lost eight of their matches during the regular season of the competition to finish fifth in the South African Conference, and in 10th place overall.

== Personnel ==
=== Coaches and management ===
The Stormers coaching and management staff for the 2019 Super Rugby season were:

2019 Stormers coaches and management
Name	Title
Robbie Fleck	Head coach
Russell Winter	Forwards coach
Paul Feeney	Skills coach
Human Kriek	Technical analyst
Wayne Hector	Physiotherapist
Greg Daniels	Masseur
Karen Schwabe	Team doctor
Chippie Solomon	Team manager

=== Squad ===
The following players were named in the Stormers squad for the 2019 Super Rugby season:

2019 Stormers squad
Player	Position/s	Date of birth (age)	Super Rugby		Stormers	
Player	Position/s	Date of birth (age)	Apps	Pts	Apps	Pts
(South Africa) Juarno Augustus	Loose forward	9 December 1997 (aged 21)	3	0	3	0
(South Africa) Craig Barry	Fullback	30 April 1992 (aged 26)	9	0	9	0
(South Africa) Kwenzo Blose	Prop	12 May 1997 (aged 21)	0	0	0	0
(South Africa) Jaco Coetzee	Loose forward	10 June 1996 (aged 22)	4	0	4	0
(South Africa) Damian de Allende	Centre	25 November 1991 (aged 27)	77	65	77	65
(South Africa) Paul de Wet	Scrum-half	16 March 1996 (aged 22)	6	5	6	5
(South Africa) Daniël du Plessis	Centre	17 March 1995 (aged 23)	9	10	9	10
(South Africa) Jean-Luc du Plessis	Fly-half	7 May 1994 (aged 24)	19	169	19	169
(South Africa) Johan du Toit	Lock	8 September 1995 (aged 23)	2	0	2	0
(South Africa) Pieter-Steph du Toit	Lock	20 August 1992 (aged 26)	67	15	40	15
(South Africa) JJ Engelbrecht	Centre	22 February 1989 (aged 29)	76	60	11	15
(South Africa) Eben Etzebeth	Lock	29 October 1991 (aged 27)	54	20	54	20
(South Africa) Neethling Fouché	Prop	10 January 1993 (aged 26)	1	0	1	0
(South Africa) Corné Fourie	Prop	2 September 1988 (aged 30)	64	30	0	0
(South Africa) Herschel Jantjies	Scrum-half	22 April 1996 (aged 22)	1	0	1	0
(South Africa) Dan Jooste	Hooker	21 February 1998 (aged 20)	0	0	0	0
(South Africa) Steven Kitshoff	Prop	10 February 1992 (aged 27)	78	10	78	10
(South Africa) Siya Kolisi	Loose forward	16 June 1991 (aged 27)	104	80	104	80
(South Africa) Dan Kriel	Centre	15 February 1994 (aged 25)	13	0	10	0
(South Africa) Michael Kumbirai	Prop	9 May 1996 (aged 22)	0	0	0	0
(South Africa) Dillyn Leyds	Wing	12 September 1992 (aged 26)	53	100	50	100
(South Africa) Wilco Louw	Prop	20 July 1994 (aged 24)	33	25	33	25
(South Africa) Frans Malherbe	Prop	14 March 1991 (aged 27)	85	15	85	15
(South Africa) SP Marais	Fullback	16 March 1989 (aged 29)	68	142	22	124
(South Africa) Chris Massyn	Flank	3 June 1994 (aged 24)	0	0	0	0
(South Africa) Lee-Marvin Mazibuko	Prop	12 October 1997 (aged 21)	0	0	0	0
(South Africa) Bongi Mbonambi	Hooker	7 January 1991 (aged 28)	64	5	49	5
(South Africa) David Meihuizen	Lock	13 November 1997 (aged 21)	0	0	0	0
(South Africa) Salmaan Moerat	Lock	3 June 1998 (aged 20)	3	0	3	0
(South Africa) Ruhan Nel	Centre	17 May 1991 (aged 27)	0	0	0	0
(South Africa) Sikhumbuzo Notshe	Loose forward	28 May 1993 (aged 25)	52	65	52	65
(South Africa) Scarra Ntubeni	Hooker	18 February 1991 (aged 27)	52	20	52	20
(South Africa) Sergeal Petersen	Wing	1 August 1994 (aged 24)	28	60	0	0
(South Africa) Justin Phillips	Scrum-half	3 February 1995 (aged 24)	13	5	13	5
(South Africa) Marno Redelinghuys	Flank	13 November 1997 (aged 21)	0	0	0	0
(South Africa) Duncan Saal	Wing	24 October 1996 (aged 22)	0	0	0	0
(South Africa) Ramone Samuels	Hooker	3 November 1994 (aged 24)	35	15	32	15
(South Africa) JD Schickerling	Lock	9 May 1995 (aged 23)	21	5	21	5
(South Africa) Seabelo Senatla	Wing	10 February 1993 (aged 26)	19	25	19	25
(South Africa) Chad Solomon	Hooker	23 February 1994 (aged 24)	0	0	0	0
(South Africa) Joshua Stander	Fly-half	1 January 1994 (aged 25)	2	12	2	12
(South Africa) Edwill van der Merwe	Wing	12 April 1996 (aged 22)	0	0	0	0
(South Africa) Kobus van Dyk	Loose forward	6 July 1994 (aged 24)	21	5	21	5
(South Africa) Ernst van Rhyn	Lock	19 September 1997 (aged 21)	0	0	0	0
(South Africa) Chris van Zyl	Lock	12 July 1986 (aged 32)	26	5	26	5
(South Africa) Alistair Vermaak	Prop	28 April 1989 (aged 29)	24	0	24	0
(South Africa) Jano Vermaak	Scrum-half	1 January 1985 (aged 34)	122	108	18	5
(South Africa) EW Viljoen	Fullback	9 May 1995 (aged 23)	28	35	28	35
(South Africa) Cobus Wiese	Loose forward	2 June 1997 (aged 21)	16	5	16	5
(South Africa) Damian Willemse	Fly-half	7 May 1998 (aged 20)	16	130	16	130
(South Africa) Nama Xaba	Flank	26 July 1997 (aged 21)	0	0	0	0
Note: Players' ages and statistics are correct as of 15 February 2019, the date of the opening round of the competition.

== Standings ==
2019 Super Rugby standings
Pos	Team	Pld	W	D	L	PF	PA	PD	TF	TA	TB	LB	Pts	Qualification
1	Crusaders (C)	16	11	3	2	497	257	+240	73	31	8	0	58	Quarter-finals (Conference leaders)
2	Jaguares	16	11	0	5	461	352	+109	60	38	5	2	51	Quarter-finals (Conference leaders)
3	Brumbies	16	10	0	6	430	366	+64	65	49	5	3	48	Quarter-finals (Conference leaders)
4	Hurricanes	16	12	1	3	449	362	+87	60	46	3	0	53	Quarter-finals (Wildcard)
5	Bulls	16	8	2	6	410	369	+41	42	50	3	2	41	Quarter-finals (Wildcard)
6	Sharks	16	7	1	8	343	335	+8	40	39	3	4	37	Quarter-finals (Wildcard)
7	Chiefs	16	7	2	7	451	465	−14	63	59	2	2	36	Quarter-finals (Wildcard)
8	Highlanders	16	6	3	7	441	392	+49	60	53	2	4	36	Quarter-finals (Wildcard)
9	Lions	16	8	0	8	401	478	−77	53	64	2	1	35	
10	Stormers	16	7	1	8	344	366	−22	34	46	1	4	35	
11	Rebels	16	7	0	9	393	465	−72	56	61	3	3	34	
12	Waratahs	16	6	0	10	367	415	−48	46	54	0	6	30	
13	Blues	16	5	1	10	347	369	−22	45	47	2	6	30	
14	Reds	16	6	0	10	385	438	−53	50	59	1	3	28	
15	Sunwolves	16	2	0	14	294	584	−290	34	85	0	4	12	

Source: Super Rugby

=== Round-by-round ===
The table below shows the Stormers' progression throughout the season. For each round, their cumulative points total is shown with the overall log position:

Team	R1	R2	R3	R4	R5	R6	R7	R8	R9	R10	R11	R12	R13	R14	R15	R16	R17	R18	QF	SF	Final
Opposition	BUL	LIO	SHA	Bye	JAG	HUR	BLU	RED	REB	BRU	BUL	JAG	Bye	CRU	HIG	LIO	SUN	SHA	—	—	—
Cumulative Points	0	4	8	8	13	14	14	14	18	19	23	24	24	26	30	30	34	35	—	—	—
Position (overall)	15th	11th	8th	10th	6th	6th	9th	11th	10th	10th	7th	8th	10th	12th	9th	11th	7th	10th	—	—	—
Position (SA Conf.)	5th	5th	4th	5th	3rd	3rd	4th	5th	4th	4th	4th	4th	5th	5th	5th	5th	4th	5th	—	—	—
Key:	win	draw	loss	bye																	

== Matches ==
The Stormers played the following matches during the 2019 Super Rugby season:

16 February 2019	Bulls	40–3	Stormers	Loftus Versfeld, Pretoria
17:15	Try: Rosko Specman 4', 19'; Johnny Kôtze 24'; Jesse Kriel 45'; Con: Handré Pollard 5', 20', 25', 46'; Pen: Handré Pollard 51', 55', 70', 77'	Scoreboard	Pen: SP Marais 10'

23 February 2019	Stormers	19–17	Lions	DHL Newlands, Cape Town
17:15	Try: Herschel Jantjies 80'; Con: SP Marais 80'; Pen: SP Marais 11', 28', 50', 61'	Scoreboard	Try: Kwagga Smith 6'; Warren Whiteley 20'; Con: Elton Jantjies 7', 21'; Pen: Elton Jantjies 64'

2 March 2019	Sharks	11–16	Stormers	Jonsson Kings Park, Durban
17:15	Try: Lukhanyo Am 42'; Pen: Robert du Preez 15', 51'	Scoreboard	Try: Damian Willemse 4'; Con: SP Marais 5'; Pen: SP Marais 28', 38', 65'

15 March 2019	Stormers	35–8	Jaguares	DHL Newlands, Cape Town
19:10	Try: Daniël du Plessis 18'; Siya Kolisi 47'; Herschel Jantjies 59'; Justin Phillips 77'; Con: SP Marais 19', 48'; Jean-Luc du Plessis 60'; Pen: SP Marais 13', 34', 40'	Scoreboard	Try: Bautista Delguy 4'; Pen: Joaquín Díaz Bonilla 25'

23 March 2019	Hurricanes	34–28	Stormers	Westpac Stadium, Wellington
08:35	Try: Ben May 12'; Jordie Barrett 24'; Wes Goosen 52', 61'; Beauden Barrett 69'; Con: Beauden Barrett 12', 53', 71'; Pen: Beauden Barrett 20'	Scoreboard	Try: Siya Kolisi 29'; Bongi Mbonambi 40'; Jaco Coetzee 58'; Con: SP Marais 31', 58'; Pen: SP Marais 4', 8', 38'

30 March 2019	Blues	24–9	Stormers	Eden Park, Auckland
08:35	Try: Tanielu Tele’a 30'; Otere Black 61'; Rieko Ioane 74'; Con: Otere Black 32', 62', 75'; Pen: Otere Black 38'	Scoreboard	Pen: Jean-Luc du Plessis 19', 29', 47'

5 April 2019	Reds	24–12	Stormers	Suncorp Stadium, Brisbane
11:00	Try: Samu Kerevi 41'; Brandon Paenga-Amosa 45'; Tate McDermott 65'; Con: Bryce Hegarty 42', 47', 67'; Pen: Bryce Hegarty 78'	Scoreboard	Try: Kobus van Dyk 51'; Damian de Allende 74'; Con: Jean-Luc du Plessis 51'

12 April 2019	Rebels	24–41	Stormers	AAMI Park, Melbourne
11:45	Try: Reece Hodge 41'; Will Genia 68'; Campbell Magnay 76'; Con: Quade Cooper 42', 68', 77'; Pen: Quade Cooper 22'	Scoreboard	Try: Dillyn Leyds 3'; Juarno Augustus 46'; Damian de Allende 51'; Ruhan Nel 55', 78'; Con: Jean-Luc du Plessis 4', 48'; Joshua Stander 52', 56', 79'; Pen: Jean-Luc du Plessis 25'; Joshua Stander 60'

20 April 2019	Stormers	17–19	Brumbies	DHL Newlands, Cape Town
15:05	Try: penalty try 40'; Wilco Louw 45'; Con: Joshua Stander 46'; Pen: Joshua Stander 9'	Scoreboard	Try: Pete Samu 6'; Rory Arnold 10'; Tom Banks 57'; Con: Christian Lealiifano 11', 59'

27 April 2019	Stormers	24–23	Bulls	DHL Newlands, Cape Town
15:05	Try: Sergeal Petersen 12'; Seabelo Senatla 28'; Herschel Jantjies 59'; Con: Jean-Luc du Plessis 14', 29'; Joshua Stander 60'; Pen: Joshua Stander 56'	Scoreboard	Try: Ivan van Zyl 42'; Manie Libbok 80'; Con: Handré Pollard 43', 80'; Pen: Handré Pollard 22', 37', 40'

4 May 2019	Jaguares	30–25	Stormers	José Amalfitani Stadium, Buenos Aires
21:40	Try: Pablo Matera 4'; Ramiro Moyano 51' penalty try 72'; Con: Domingo Miotti 5', 52'; Pen: Domingo Miotti 10', 40', 66'	Scoreboard	Try: Seabelo Senatla 75'; Con: Damian Willemse 76'; Pen: Jean-Luc du Plessis 16', 24', 31', 46'; Damian Willemse 60', 63'

18 May 2019	Stormers	19–19	Crusaders	DHL Newlands, Cape Town
17:15	Try: Siya Kolisi 6'; Con: Joshua Stander 7'; Pen: Joshua Stander 16', 53'; Jean-Luc du Plessis 62', 80'	Scoreboard	Try: Matt Todd 27'; David Havili 35'; Braydon Ennor 44'; Con: Richie Mo'unga 36', 45'

25 May 2019	Stormers	34–22	Highlanders	DHL Newlands, Cape Town
15:05	Try: Herschel Jantjies 19'; Siya Kolisi 33'; Cobus Wiese 55'; Jean-Luc du Plessis 69'; Con: Joshua Stander 20', 34', 56'; Jean-Luc du Plessis 71'; Pen: Joshua Stander 25'; Jean-Luc du Plessis 62'	Scoreboard	Try: Sio Tomkinson 51'; Waisake Naholo 67'; Siate Tokolahi 80'; Con: Marty Banks 53'; Dan Hollinshead 80'; Pen: Marty Banks 18'

1 June 2019	Lions	41–22	Stormers	Emirates Airline Park, Johannesburg
17:15	Try: Kwagga Smith 10', 43'; Andries Coetzee 34'; Courtnall Skosan 47'; Aphiwe Dyantyi 57'; Hacjivah Dayimani 78'; Con: Shaun Reynolds 45', 48', 58', 79'; Pen: Shaun Reynolds 27'	Scoreboard	Try: Johan du Toit 39'; Herschel Jantjies 52'; Joshua Stander 66'; Con: Joshua Stander 39', 53'; Pen: Joshua Stander 33'

8 June 2019	Stormers	31–18	Sunwolves	DHL Newlands, Cape Town
17:15	Try: Bongi Mbonambi 15'; Craig Barry 29'; Jaco Coetzee 53', 72'; Con: Jean-Luc du Plessis 17', 31', 54'; Joshua Stander 73'; Pen: Joshua Stander 64'	Scoreboard	Try: Semisi Masirewa 61', 75'; Con: Hayden Parker 62'; Pen: Hayden Parker 10', 35'

15 June 2019	Stormers	9–12	Sharks	DHL Newlands, Cape Town
15:05	Pen: Joshua Stander 23', 44'; Jean-Luc du Plessis 76'	Scoreboard	Try: Rhyno Smith 28'; Lukhanyo Am 80'; Con: Robert du Preez 80'

== Player statistics ==
The Super Rugby appearance record for players that represented the Stormers in 2019 is as follows:

2019 Stormers player statistics
Player name	BUL	LIO	SHA	JAG	HUR	BLU	RED	REB	BRU	BUL	JAG	CRU	HIG	LIO	SUN	SHA	QF	SF	F	App	Try	Con	Pen	DG	Pts
Alistair Vermaak	1	1	1														—	—	—	3	0	0	0	0	0
Bongi Mbonambi	2	2	2	16 (substituted in)	2	2	16 (substituted in)	2	2	16 (substituted in)	2	2			2	2	—	—	—	14	2	0	0	0	10
Wilco Louw	3		18 (substituted in)	18 (substituted in)	18 (substituted in)	3		3	3	18 (substituted in)	3		18 (substituted in)	3	18 (substituted in)	18 (substituted in)	—	—	—	13	1	0	0	0	5
Salmaan Moerat	4				19 (substituted in)		19 (substituted in)	4	4								—	—	—	5	0	0	0	0	0
JD Schickerling	5	5	5	5	5					5	5						—	—	—	7	0	0	0	0	0
Siya Kolisi	6	6	6	6	6	6	6		20 (substituted in)	6		6	6				—	—	—	11	4	0	0	0	20
Pieter-Steph du Toit	7	7	7	7	7	7			7	7		7	5				—	—	—	10	0	0	0	0	0
Sikhumbuzo Notshe	8	8									20 (substituted in)	20 (substituted in)	20 (substituted in)	8			—	—	—	6	0	0	0	0	0
Jano Vermaak	9	9													21 (substituted in)	9	—	—	—	4	0	0	0	0	0
Damian Willemse	10	15	15	23 (substituted in)	23 (substituted in)	15	15	15	15	15	15	15	15	15			—	—	—	14	1	1	2	0	13
SP Marais	11	11	11	11	11	23 (substituted in)	23 (substituted in)										—	—	—	7	0	6	14	0	54
Damian de Allende	12	12	12	12	12	12	12	12		12	22 (substituted in)	12	12	12		12	—	—	—	14	2	0	0	0	10
Ruhan Nel	13	13	22 (substituted in)	22 (substituted in)	13		13	13	13								—	—	—	8	2	0	0	0	10
JJ Engelbrecht	14								22 (substituted in)	13	13	13	13	13	13	13	—	—	—	9	0	0	0	0	0
Dillyn Leyds	15		23 (substituted in)	15	15	11	11	11	11	11	11	11	11	11	15	15	—	—	—	15	1	0	0	0	5
Scarra Ntubeni	16 (substituted in)	16 (substituted in)	16 (substituted in)	2	16 (substituted in)	16 (substituted in)	2	16 (substituted in)	16 (substituted in)	2	16 (substituted in)	16 (substituted in)	2			16 (substituted in)	—	—	—	14	0	0	0	0	0
Corné Fourie	17 (substituted in)	17 (substituted in)	17 (substituted in)	17 (substituted in)	17 (substituted in)	17 (substituted in)	1	17 (substituted in)	17 (substituted in)	17 (substituted in)	17 (substituted in)	17 (substituted in)	17 (substituted in)	17 (substituted in)	17 (substituted in)	17 (substituted in)	—	—	—	16	0	0	0	0	0
Neethling Fouché	18 (substituted in)	18 (substituted in)							18 (substituted in)		18 (substituted in)	18 (substituted in)					—	—	—	5	0	0	0	0	0
Chris van Zyl	19 (substituted in)	4	19 (substituted in)		4	5	5								5	5	—	—	—	8	0	0	0	0	0
Kobus van Dyk	20 (substituted in)						7	7	8	8	8	19 (substituted in)	7				—	—	—	8	1	0	0	0	5
Herschel Jantjies	21 (substituted in)	21 (substituted in)	9	9	9	9	21 (substituted in)	9	9	9	9	9	9	9	9		—	—	—	15	5	0	0	0	25
Jean-Luc du Plessis	22 (substituted in)	10	10	10	10	10	10	10		10	10	22 (substituted in)	22 (substituted in)	22 (substituted in)	10	22 (substituted in)	—	—	—	15	1	10	12	0	61
Daniël du Plessis	23 (substituted in)	23 (substituted in)	13	13	22 (substituted in)	13											—	—	—	6	1	0	0	0	5
Frans Malherbe		3	3	3	3	18 (substituted in)	3	18 (substituted in)		3		3	3	18 (substituted in)	3	3	—	—	—	13	0	0	0	0	0
Sergeal Petersen		14	14	14	14	14	14	14	14	14	14						—	—	—	10	1	0	0	0	5
Eben Etzebeth		19 (substituted in)	4	4		4				19 (substituted in)	4	4		4			—	—	—	8	0	0	0	0	0
Jaco Coetzee		20 (substituted in)	8	20 (substituted in)	20 (substituted in)	8	8	8			6	8	8	6	8	8	—	—	—	13	3	0	0	0	15
Joshua Stander		22 (substituted in)				22 (substituted in)	22 (substituted in)	22 (substituted in)	10	22 (substituted in)		10	10	10	22 (substituted in)	10	—	—	—	11	1	12	10	0	59
Juarno Augustus			20 (substituted in)	8	8	20 (substituted in)	20 (substituted in)	20 (substituted in)									—	—	—	6	1	0	0	0	5
Justin Phillips			21 (substituted in)	21 (substituted in)	21	21 (substituted in)	9	21 (substituted in)	21 (substituted in)	21 (substituted in)	21 (substituted in)	21 (substituted in)	21 (substituted in)	21 (substituted in)		21 (substituted in)	—	—	—	12	1	0	0	0	5
Steven Kitshoff				1	1	1	17 (substituted in)	1	1	1	1	1	1	1	1	1	—	—	—	13	0	0	0	0	0
Cobus Wiese				19 (substituted in)		19 (substituted in)	4	5	5	4	7	5	4	5	4	4	—	—	—	12	1	0	0	0	5
Michael Kumbirai							18 (substituted in)										—	—	—	1	0	0	0	0	0
Ernst van Rhyn								6	6	20 (substituted in)				19 (substituted in)	6	6	—	—	—	6	0	0	0	0	0
Johan du Toit								19 (substituted in)	19 (substituted in)		19 (substituted in)		19 (substituted in)	7	7	7	—	—	—	7	1	0	0	0	5
Seabelo Senatla								23 (substituted in)	23 (substituted in)	23 (substituted in)	23 (substituted in)	14	14	14		14	—	—	—	8	2	0	0	0	10
Dan Kriel									12		12	23 (substituted in)	23 (substituted in)	23 (substituted in)	12	23 (substituted in)	—	—	—	7	0	0	0	0	0
Chad Solomon													16 (substituted in)	2	16 (substituted in)		—	—	—	3	0	0	0	0	0
Dan Jooste														16 (substituted in)			—	—	—	1	0	0	0	0	0
Marno Redelinghuys														20 (substituted in)			—	—	—	1	0	0	0	0	0
Edwill van der Merwe															11	11	—	—	—	2	0	0	0	0	0
Craig Barry															14		—	—	—	1	1	0	0	0	5
David Meihuizen															19 (substituted in)	19 (substituted in)	—	—	—	2	0	0	0	0	0
Chris Massyn															20 (substituted in)	20 (substituted in)	—	—	—	2	0	0	0	0	0
EW Viljoen															23 (substituted in)		—	—	—	1	0	0	0	0	0
penalty try																				–	1	–	–	–	7
Total																				16	34	29	38	0	344

(c) denotes the team captain. For each match, the player's squad number is shown. Starting players are numbered 1 to 15, while the replacements are numbered 16 to 23. If a replacement made an appearance in the match, it is indicated by (substituted in) . "App" refers to the number of appearances made by the player, "Try" to the number of tries scored by the player, "Con" to the number of conversions kicked, "Pen" to the number of penalties kicked, "DG" to the number of drop goals kicked and "Pts" refer to the total number of points scored by the player.

- Kwenzo Blose, Paul de Wet, Lee-Marvin Mazibuko, Duncan Saal, Ramone Samuels and Nama Xaba did not make any appearances.

== See also ==
- Stormers
- 2019 Super Rugby season
