= Blosser =

Blosser is a surname. Notable people with the name include:

- Charles H. Blosser (1895–1989), former owner of Blosser Municipal Airport in Concordia, Kansas
- Greg Blosser (born 1971), former outfielder in Major League Baseball
- Henry G. Blosser (1928–2013), American nuclear physicist
- Merrill Blosser (1892–1983), American cartoonist

== See also ==
- Blosser Municipal Airport, two miles south of Concordia, in Cloud County, Kansas, United States
- Kermit Blosser Ohio Athletics Hall of Fame for Ohio Bobcats athletes
- Henry Blosser House, historic home near Malta Bend, Saline County, Missouri, United States
- Blosser, Missouri, ghost town in Saline County, Missouri, United States
- Sokol Blosser Winery, vineyard, tasting room and winery near Dayton, Oregon, United States
- Blose, South African surname
