= Blose =

Blose is a surname. Notable people with the surname include:

- Brian Blose, South African politician
- Happy Blose, South African politician
- Kwenzo Blose, South African rugby union player

== See also ==
- Blosser, surname
- Blosenbergturm, disused radio transmitter in Switzerland
- Bloserville, Pennsylvania, unincorporated community in the USA
