= CNK =

CNK may refer to:

- Blosser Municipal Airport's IATA airport code
- Cinemark Theatres's NYSE stock symbol
- Compute Node Kernel, an operating system
- Crash Nitro Kart, a 2003 video game
