= 2014 Under-21 Provincial Championship =

The 2014 Under-21 Provincial Championship was a rugby union competition held between the Under-21 players from the fourteen provincial rugby unions in South Africa, plus the Limpopo Blue Bulls sub-union. It was contested from 11 July to 25 October 2014.

== Group A ==
=== Competition ===
There were seven participating teams in the 2014 Under-21 Provincial Championship Group A. These teams played each other twice over the course of the season, once at home and once away.

Teams received four points for a win and two points for a draw. Bonus points were awarded to teams that scored 4 or more tries in a game, as well as to teams that lost a match by 7 points or less. Teams were ranked by points, then points difference (points scored less points conceded).

The top 4 teams qualified for the title play-offs. In the semi-finals, the team that finished first had home advantage against the team that finished fourth, while the team that finished second had home advantage against the team that finished third. The winners of these semi-finals played each other in the final, at the same venue as the 2014 Currie Cup Premier Division Final.

The bottom team in Group A played a play-off game at home against the winner of the Group B final for a place in the 2015 Under-21 Provincial Championship Group A.

=== Teams ===
Location of teams in 2014 Under-21 Provincial Championship Group A

==== Team listing ====
The following teams took part in the 2014 Under-21 Provincial Championship Group A competition:

2014 Under-21 Provincial Championship Group A teams
| Team | Stadium/s |
| Blue Bulls U21 | Loftus Versfeld, Pretoria |
| Border U21 | Buffalo City Stadium, East London |
| Free State U21 | Free State Stadium, Bloemfontein |
| Golden Lions U21 | Ellis Park Stadium, Johannesburg |
| Leopards U21 | Olën Park, Potchefstroom |
| Sharks U21 | Kings Park Stadium, Durban |
| Western Province U21 | Newlands Stadium, Cape Town |

=== Log ===
The final log of the round-robin stage of the 2014 under-21 provincial championship group A is:

2014 Under-21 Provincial Championship Group A log
| Pos | Team | Pld | W | D | L | PF | PA | PD | TF | TA | TB | LB | Pts | Qualification |
|---|---|---|---|---|---|---|---|---|---|---|---|---|---|---|
| 1 | Western Province U21 | 12 | 11 | 0 | 1 | 580 | 268 | +312 | 83 | 36 | 10 | 0 | 54 | Qualified for the semi-finals |
| 2 | Blue Bulls U21 | 12 | 9 | 0 | 3 | 600 | 225 | +375 | 81 | 27 | 8 | 2 | 46 | Qualified for the semi-finals |
| 3 | Golden Lions U21 | 12 | 8 | 0 | 4 | 543 | 262 | +281 | 79 | 31 | 9 | 1 | 42 | Qualified for the semi-finals |
| 4 | Free State U21 | 12 | 7 | 0 | 5 | 429 | 273 | +156 | 59 | 36 | 6 | 1 | 35 | Qualified for the semi-finals |
| 5 | Sharks U21 | 12 | 5 | 0 | 7 | 413 | 376 | +37 | 56 | 50 | 5 | 0 | 25 | |
| 6 | Leopards U21 | 12 | 2 | 0 | 10 | 353 | 442 | −89 | 49 | 56 | 5 | 2 | 15 | |
| 7 | Border U21 | 12 | 0 | 0 | 12 | 59 | 1131 | −1072 | 4 | 175 | 0 | 0 | 0 | Promotion/relegation play-offs |

Updated to match(es) played on 5 October 2014. Source:
Rules for classification: 4 points for a win, 2 points for a draw, 1 bonus point for a loss by seven points or less, 1 bonus point for scoring four or more tries in a match

=== Fixtures and results ===
- Fixtures are subject to change.
- All times are South African (GMT+2).

==== Round one ====
| 11 July 2014 | Sharks U21 | 37–17 | Leopards U21 | Kings Park Stadium, Durban |
| 15:00 | Try: Matthew Jones 1'; Tyler Fisher 40'; Thembalethu Williams 45'; Alcino Izaacs 59'; Con: Jean Pretorius 2' (1/1); Jean-Luc du Plessis 40', 45', 59' (3/3); Pen: Jean-Luc du Plessis 6', 25', 36' (3/3) | Report; Scoreboard | Try: Rhyno Smith 42'; Dean Stokes 49'; Mark Reinecke 74'; Con: JJ du Plessis 49' (1/2); Rhyno Smith (0/1); Cards: Ryno Pienaar (yellow card) 39' to 47' | Attendance: 100; Referee: Stephan Geldenhuys |

| 11 July 2014 | Blue Bulls U21 | 143–0 | Border U21 | Loftus Versfeld, Pretoria |
| 16:45 | Try: Dan Kriel 4'; Neethling Fouché 9', 42'; Kefentse Mahlo 11', 36'; Joshua Stander 18', 44'; Jannes Kirsten 23', 58', 60'; Jade Stighling 32', 40'; Jan Enslin 39'; Ganfried May 48'; Christiaan de Bruin 64'; Jacques Rossouw 66', 77'; Dennis Visser 69'; Marquit September 71', 80'; JP Smith 75'; Con: Joshua Stander 4', 10', 12', 19', 24', 33', 37', 40', 41', 43', 44', 59' (12/13); Kobus Marais 61', 65', 70', 72', 75', 78', 80' (7/8) | Report; Scoreboard | Pen: Mondli Nkosi (0/1); Cards: Naythan Knoetze (yellow card) 32' | Referee: Francois Pretorius |

| 12 July 2014 | Western Province U21 | 20–17 | Free State U21 | City Park Stadium, Athlone |
| 15:30 | Try: Eital Bredenkamp 38', 51', 55'; Lihleli Xoli 73'; Con: Janco Gunter (0/4); Pen: Janco Gunter (0/1); Cards: Tapiwa Tsomondo (yellow card) 26' to 35' | Report; Scoreboard | Try: Tienie Burger 18'; Tertius Kruger 60'; Con: Ruan Potgieter 18', 60' (2/2); Pen: Ruan Potgieter 2' (1/1); Cards: Jacques du Toit (yellow card) 21' to 31'; Nico Lee (yellow card) 79' | Attendance: 1,000; Referee: Rodney Boneparte |

Bye/s: Golden Lions U21

==== Round two ====
| 18 July 2014 | Border U21 | 6–82 | Golden Lions U21 | Buffalo City Stadium, East London |
| 18:00 | Pen: Devandré Sissing 46', 63' (2/2) | Report; Scoreboard | Try: Thabo Mabuza 6'; Koch Marx 22', 79'; Jannie Stander 31'; Selom Gavor 38'; Chris Newman 51'; Jacques Nel 53'; Hanco Deale 59'; Damian Engledoe 68', 74'; Jannes Snyman 72'; Christiaan Meyer 80'; Con: Ruan van Rensburg 7', 24', 32', 39' (4/4); Hanco Deale 52', 54', 60', 72', 75', 79', 80' (7/8) |

| 19 July 2014 | Blue Bulls U21 | 53–25 | Sharks U21 | Loftus Versfeld, Pretoria |
| 15:30 | Try: Kobus Marais 20'; Ruan Steenkamp 35'; Kefentse Mahlo 44'; Marquit September 50'; Pierre Schoeman 73'; Neethling Fouché 76'; Con: Kobus Marais 21', 45', 51', 77' (4/6); Pen: Kobus Marais 7', 25', 58', 66' (4/4); Drop: Kobus Marais 59' (1/1) | Report; Scoreboard | Try: Tyler Fisher 14'; Buzwe Mpotulo 32'; Cameron Wright 64'; Con: Tim Swiel 15', 64' (2/3); Pen: Tim Swiel 11', 18' (2/3); Cards: Thembalethu Williams (yellow card) 58' to 69' | Attendance: 500 |

| 19 July 2014 | Western Province U21 | 27–20 | Leopards U21 | City Park Stadium, Athlone |
| 15:30 | Try: Eital Bredenkamp 18'; Lihleli Xoli 27'; Con: Robert du Preez 18' (1/2); Pen: Robert du Preez 3', 13', 23', 49', 67' (5/5) | Report; Scoreboard | Try: Wilmar Arnoldi 33'; Dries du Plooy 41'; Con: JJ du Plessis 33', 41' (2/2); Pen: JJ du Plessis 10' (1/1); Rhyno Smith 79' (1/2) | Attendance: 300 |

Bye/s: Free State U21

==== Round three ====
| 26 July 2014 | Sharks U21 | 15–47 | Western Province U21 | Kings Park Stadium, Durban |
| 13:00 | Try: Hanco Venter 51'; Jean Pretorius 64'; Con: Tim Swiel 64' (1/2); Pen: Jean-Luc du Plessis 25' (1/1) | Report; Scoreboard | Try: Huw Jones 9', 44'; JD Schickerling 33'; Jean Nel 42'; Sikhumbuzo Notshe 74'; Janco Gunter 77'; Johnny Kôtze 80'; Con: Robert du Preez 9', 33', 42', 74', 77' (5/6); Janco Gunter 80' (1/1); Pen: Robert du Preez (0/2) |

| 26 July 2014 | Free State U21 | 118–6 | Border U21 | Shimla Park, Bloemfontein |
| 14:00 | Try: Louis Venter 4', 21'; Hennie Theron 9', 50'; Stephan Janse van Rensburg 13', 64'; Luke Cyster 15'; Jacques du Toit 19'; Gerhard Olivier 27', 59'; Dolph Botha 30'; Daniel Maartens 41', 54'; Justin Basson 43'; Pieter Jordaan 69', 76'; Marco Klopper 74', 80'; Con: Ruan Potgieter 5', 10', 14', 16', 20', 22', 32', 44', 51', 56', 60', 70', 75', 80' (14/18) | Report; Scoreboard | Pen: Devandré Sissing 25', 46' (2/2) | Attendance: 100 |

| 26 July 2014 | Golden Lions U21 | 43–13 | Leopards U21 | Ellis Park Stadium, Johannesburg |
| 15:00 | Try: Hanco Deale 11', 80'; Rynard Snyman 45'; Cyle Brink 50'; JP du Preez 60'; Jano Venter 69'; Jannes Snyman 74'; Con: Hanco Deale 12' (1/3); Ruan van Rensburg 61', 74' (2/3); Brandan Hewitt 80' (1/1); Pen: Hanco Deale (0/1); Cards: Nico du Plessis (yellow card) 31' to 41' | Report; Scoreboard | Try: penalty try 31'; Con: Schalk Hugo 31' (1/1); Pen: Schalk Hugo 14' (1/1); Drop: Kobus du Plessis 66' (1/1); Cards: Marnus Tack (yellow card) 69' |

Bye/s: Blue Bulls U21

==== Round four ====
| 1 August 2014 | Blue Bulls U21 | 24–10 | Free State U21 | Loftus Versfeld, Pretoria |
| 15:30 | Try: Ruan Steenkamp 67'; Jan Enslin 72'; Con: Joshua Stander 68' (1/2); Pen: Joshua Stander 17', 46', 51', 58' (4/5) | Report; Scoreboard | Try: Luke Cyster 43'; Con: Ruan Potgieter 44' (1/1); Pen: Ruan Potgieter 6' (1/4); Drop: Ruan Potgieter (0/1); Cards: Hennie Theron (yellow card) 40' to 50' | Attendance: 500 |

| 1 August 2014 | Sharks U21 | 19–30 | Golden Lions U21 | Woodburn Stadium, Pietermaritzburg |
| 17:00 | Try: Alcino Izaacs 2'; André Esterhuizen 8'; Johan Meyer 62'; Con: Brendan Cope 8', 62' (2/3) | Report; Scoreboard | Try: Selom Gavor 17'; Harold Vorster 48'; Hanco Deale 59'; Con: Hanco Deale 17', 48', 59' (3/3); Pen: Hanco Deale 12', 37', 46' (3/3); Cards: Rynard Snyman (yellow card) 54' to 65' | Attendance: 0 |

| 2 August 2014 | Leopards U21 | 48–0 | Border U21 | Olën Park, Potchefstroom |
| 12:30 | Try: Marno Redelinghuys 1', 14'; Mark Reinecke 9'; Loftus Morrison 33', 72'; Rhyno Smith 47', 67', 23'; Con: Kobus du Plessis 10', 15', 24', 73' (4/8); Cards: Marno Redelinghuys (yellow card) 44' to 55' | Report; Scoreboard | Cards: Siphelele Njobeni (yellow card) 20' | Attendance: 200 |

Bye/s: Western Province U21

==== Round five ====
| 8 August 2014 | Border U21 | 0–90 | Western Province U21 | Buffalo City Stadium, East London |
| 18:00 | Pen: Devandré Sissing (0/1); Cards: Johannes Jonker (yellow card) 27' to 37'; Lindani Ndlela (yellow card) 71' | Report; Scoreboard | Try: Janco Gunter 12', 26', 69'; Eital Bredenkamp 20', 56', 73'; JP Lewis 29', 48'; Tapiwa Tsomondo 31', 51'; Chris Smith 40', 46'; Dalen Goliath 58'; Kyle Lombard 78'; Con: Chris Smith 13', 21', 40', 47', 49', 52', 57', 59', 70', 73' (10/14); Cards: Eital Bredenkamp (yellow card) 37' to 46'; Johnny Kôtze (yellow card) 73' | Attendance: 300 |

| 9 August 2014 | Golden Lions U21 | 41–30 | Blue Bulls U21 | Ellis Park Stadium, Johannesburg |
| 14:45 | Try: Malcolm Marx 5'; Damian Engledoe 11', 30'; Koch Marx 51'; Kwagga Smith 64'; Con: Hanco Deale 6', 12', 51' (3/3); Ashlon Davids 31' (1/1); Ruan van Rensburg 65' (1/1); Pen: Hanco Deale 17' (1/2); Ruan van Rensburg 77' (1/2); Drop: Brandan Hewitt (0/1) | Report; Scoreboard | Try: Rohan Janse van Rensburg 13'; Roelof Smit 39'; Jade Stighling 54'; Con: Kobus Marais 14', 40', 54' (3/3); Pen: Kobus Marais 22', 35', 48' (3/4) |

| 9 August 2014 | Leopards U21 | 29–37 | Free State U21 | Olën Park, Potchefstroom |
| 12:30 | Try: Rhyno Smith 30'; Percy Williams 56'; Mark Reinecke 69'; Loftus Morrison 74'; Con: Kobus du Plessis 57', 70', 75' (3/4); Pen: Kobus du Plessis 52' (1/1) | Report; Scoreboard | Try: Daniel Maartens 17'; Nico Lee 20'; Tertius Kruger 46'; Markus Odendaal 79'; Con: Warren Potgieter 18', 21', 47', 80' (4/4); Pen: Warren Potgieter 15', 60', 64' (3/4); Cards: Zee Mkhabela (yellow card) 36' to 47' | Referee: Eduan Nel |

Bye/s: Sharks U21

==== Round six ====
| 15 August 2014 | Sharks U21 | 3–30 | Free State U21 | Kings Park Stadium, Durban |
| 16:45 | Pen: Tim Swiel 12' (1/1) | Report; Scoreboard | Try: Don Mlondobozi 26'; Carel-Jan Coetzee 43'; Warren Potgieter 51'; Pieter Jordaan 70'; Con: Warren Potgieter 27', 71' (2/4); Pen: Warren Potgieter 8', 31' (2/2) | Referee: Pro Legoete |

| 16 August 2014 | Western Province U21 | 28–21 | Blue Bulls U21 | Newlands Stadium, Cape Town |
| 11:45 | Try: Eital Bredenkamp 38', 58'; Robert du Preez 65'; Con: Robert du Preez 39', 66' (2/3); Pen: Robert du Preez 5', 26', 40' (3/4) | Report; Scoreboard | Try: Ruan Steenkamp 54'; Rohan Janse van Rensburg 73'; Con: Joshua Stander (0/1); Kobus Marais 74' (1/1); Pen: Joshua Stander 20', 46' (2/2); Kobus Marais 79' (1/1); Cards: Carlo Engelbrecht (yellow card) 51' to 61'; Jannes Kirsten (yellow card) 68' to 78' | Referee: Quinton Immelman |

| 16 August 2014 | Golden Lions U21 | 113–3 | Border U21 | Ellis Park Stadium, Johannesburg |
| 12:30 | Try: Damian Engledoe 2', 81'; Victor Sekekete 9', 44'; Matthew Phillips 21'; Dylan Smith 27'; Koch Marx 30', 48', 52'; Christiaan Meyer 38'; Bobby de Wee 59', 73'; Ramone Samuels 63'; Chris Newman 68'; Brandan Hewitt 69', 75'; Ashlon Davids 77'; Con: Brandan Hewitt 3', 10', 22', 28', 31', 39', 49', 53', 60', 64', 68', 74', 78', 82' (14/17) | Report; Scoreboard | Pen: Devandré Sissing 7' (1/1) | Attendance: 1,000; Referee: Francois Pretorius |

Bye/s: Leopards U21

==== Round seven ====
| 22 August 2014 | Border U21 | 0–72 | Free State U21 | Buffalo City Stadium, East London |
| 16:30 | Cards: Anda Nanto (yellow card) 4' to 14' | Report; Scoreboard | Try: Carel-Jan Coetzee 10'; Don Mlondobozi 23'; Marco Klopper 29', 37', 39'; Donovan Gissing 32'; Warren Potgieter 42'; Pieter Jordaan 46'; Henco van der Westhuizen 51'; Steven Meiring 67'; Gerhard Olivier 74'; Con: Pieter Jordaan 11', 33', 38', 39', 43', 47', 52' (7/11); Pen: Pieter Jordaan 4' (1/1) | Attendance: 300; Referee: Lourens van der Merwe |

| 23 August 2014 | Blue Bulls U21 | 38–20 | Leopards U21 | Loftus Versfeld, Pretoria |
| 12:40 | Try: Jade Stighling 4'; Rohan Janse van Rensburg 17', 78'; Duncan Matthews 37'; Ruan Steenkamp 55'; Con: Kobus Marais 5', 18', 38', 55', 79' (5/5); Pen: Kobus Marais 68' (1/2) | Report; Scoreboard | Try: Rhyno Smith 32'; Wilmar Arnoldi 61'; Con: Kobus du Plessis 33', 62' (2/2); Pen: Kobus du Plessis 40', 50' (2/3) | Referee: Cwengile Jadezweni |

| 23 August 2014 | Western Province U21 | 50–31 | Golden Lions U21 | Newlands Stadium, Cape Town |
| 14:45 | Try: Eital Bredenkamp 7', 74'; Lihleli Xoli 10', 38'; Kyle Lombard 21'; Robert du Preez 41'; Johnny Kôtze 70'; Con: Robert du Preez 11', 22', 39', 42', 71', 75' (6/7); Pen: Robert du Preez 37' (1/1); Cards: Kyle Lombard (yellow card) 64' to 75' | Report; Scoreboard | Try: Malcolm Marx 14'; Bobby de Wee 33'; Koch Marx 46'; Cyle Brink 77'; Selom Gavor 79'; Con: Ruan van Rensburg 34', 47', 80' (3/5); Cards: Jacques Nel (yellow card) 67' to 77' | Referee: Christie du Preez |

Bye/s: Sharks U21

==== Round eight ====
| 30 August 2014 | Leopards U21 | 41–55 | Sharks U21 | Olën Park, Potchefstroom |
| 12:30 | Try: Rhyno Smith 14', 23', 30'; Ryno Pienaar 44'; Kerneels Swart 65'; Con: Rhyno Smith 15', 24', 31', 45', 66' (5/5); Pen: Rhyno Smith 19', 32' (2/2); Cards: Marnus Tack (yellow card) 67' to 79' | Report; Scoreboard | Try: Buzwe Mpotulo 25'; Khulu Marwana 34', 54'; Sias Koen 68'; Louis Hazelhurst 71'; André Esterhuizen 73'; Con: Tim Swiel 26', 35' (2/2); Brendan Cope 55', 69', 72' (3/4); Pen: Tim Swiel 8', 17', 28', 36' (4/4); Brendan Cope 46' (1/1) | Attendance: 100; Referee: Jaco Pretorius |

| 30 August 2014 | Blue Bulls U21 | 44–30 | Western Province U21 | Loftus Versfeld, Pretoria |
| 14:45 | Try: Rohan Janse van Rensburg 18'; Dan Kriel 24', 41'; Jan Enslin 33'; Kobus Marais 61'; Jade Stighling 67'; Con: Kobus Marais 19', 34', 62', 68' (4/6); Pen: Kobus Marais 45', 73' (2/3) | Report; Scoreboard | Try: Sikhumbuzo Notshe 28', 75'; Johnny Kôtze 49'; Robert du Preez 64'; Con: Robert du Preez 49', 64' (2/4); Pen: Robert du Preez 3', 15' (2/3) |

| 30 August 2014 | Free State U21 | 12–52 | Golden Lions U21 | Old Greys Rugby Field, Bloemfontein |
| 14:45 | Try: Carel-Jan Coetzee 29', 39'; Con: Pieter Jordaan 30' (1/2) | Report; Scoreboard | Try: Selom Gavor 9'; Jacques Nel 18', 59'; Harold Vorster 21'; Chris Newman 54'; Koch Marx 65', 79'; Con: Cyle Brink 10' (1/1); Ruan van Rensburg 19', 22', 55', 60', 66', 80' (6/6); Pen: Ruan van Rensburg 3' (1/1) | Attendance: 100; Referee: Quinton Immelman |

Bye/s: Border U21

==== Round nine ====
| 5 September 2014 | Border U21 | 10–59 | Sharks U21 | Buffalo City Stadium, East London |
| 18:00 | Try: Le-Roy Ndlopfu 70'; Con: Devandré Sissing 71' (1/1); Pen: Akhona Sihunu 15' (1/1); Cards: Sibulele Nanto (yellow card) 48' to 58' | Report; Scoreboard | Try: André Esterhuizen 4', 58'; Neil Maritz 8'; Khulu Marwana 11'; Alrin Eksteen 32'; Stefan Ungerer 45'; Barend Potgieter 50'; Alcino Izaacs 76'; Wesley White 80'; Con: Brendan Cope 5', 9', 12', 46', 51', 59' (6/7); Stefan Ungerer 81' (1/2); Cards: André Esterhuizen (yellow card) 61' to 72'; Khulu Marwana (yellow card) 68' to 78' | Referee: Rodney Boneparte |

| 6 September 2014 | Free State U21 | 39–38 | Leopards U21 | Free State Stadium, Bloemfontein |
| 13:00 | Try: Henry Immelman 6'; Carel-Jan Coetzee 25'; Gerhard Olivier 52'; Jan Venter 57'; Tertius Kruger 70'; Con: Warren Potgieter 26', 53', 58' (3/4); Henry Immelman 71' (1/1); Pen: Warren Potgieter 12' (1/1); Henry Immelman 60' (1/1) | Report; Scoreboard | Try: Rhyno Smith 3', 22'; Dries du Plooy 18', 45'; Loftus Morrison 80'; Con: Rhyno Smith 4', 19', 23', 46', 80' (5/5); Pen: Rhyno Smith 63' (1/1) | Referee: Gerrie de Bruin |

| 6 September 2014 | Blue Bulls U21 | 25–31 | Golden Lions U21 | Loftus Versfeld, Pretoria |
| 16:40 | Try: Ruan Steenkamp 9'; Ganfried May 15'; Clyde Davids 22'; Con: Kobus Marais 9', 16' (2/3); Pen: Kobus Marais 4', 57' (2/2); Drop: Kobus Marais (0/1); Cards: Christiaan de Bruin (yellow card) 68' to 78' | Report; Scoreboard | Try: Ashlon Davids 6'; Selom Gavor 30', 60'; Malcolm Marx 35'; Harold Vorster 64'; Con: Ruan van Rensburg 7', 60', 64' (3/5); Pen: Ruan van Rensburg (0/1) | Referee: Jaco Pretorius |

Bye/s: Western Province U21

==== Round ten ====
| 12 September 2014 | Border U21 | 17–86 | Leopards U21 | Buffalo City Stadium, East London |
| 17:00 | Try: Nkululeko Jwatya 48'; Lindani Ndlela 61'; Con: Devandré Sissing 49' (1/1); Lindani Ndlela 61' (1/1); Pen: Devandré Sissing 2' (1/1); Cards: Siphelele Njobeni (yellow card) 26'; Le-Roy Ndlopfu (yellow card) 55' | Report; Scoreboard | Try: Rudolph du Plooy 4', 23'; Wynand Breytenbach 11', 18'; Loftus Morrison 27', 56'; Dean Stokes 30', 33'; Kobus du Plessis 40'; Marnus Tack 43'; Jaco Buys 50'; Cayle Denner 72'; Dries du Plooy 74', 79'; Con: Kobus du Plessis 5', 12', 19', 24', 31', 73', 75', 80' (8/14) | Attendance: 100; Referee: Daniel Fortuin |

| 13 September 2014 | Free State U21 | 43–21 | Sharks U21 | Free State Stadium, Bloemfontein |
| 12:45 | Try: Justin Basson 14'; Henco Greyling 43'; Carel-Jan Coetzee 45'; Vincent Maruping 69'; Daniel Maartens 72'; Pieter Jordaan 78'; Con: Pieter Jordaan 44', 46', 70', 73', 79' (5/6); Pen: Pieter Jordaan 23' (1/1) | Report; Scoreboard | Try: Neil Maritz 27'; Louis Hazelhurst 34'; Barend Potgieter 80'; Con: Brendan Cope 28', 80' (2/2); Stefan Ungerer 35' (1/1) | Attendance: 1,000; Referee: Cwengile Jadezweni |

| 13 September 2014 | Golden Lions U21 | 42–43 | Western Province U21 | Ellis Park Stadium, Johannesburg |
| 14:45 | Try: Jannie Stander 3'; Chris Newman 7'; Dylan Smith 50'; Jannes Snyman 60'; Brandan Hewitt 66'; Nico du Plessis 77'; Con: Hanco Deale 4', 8', 51' (3/3); Brandan Hewitt 61', 67', 78' (3/3); Cards: Ramone Samuels (yellow card) 53' to 63' | Report; Scoreboard | Try: Carel du Preez 16'; Lihleli Xoli 30', 42'; EW Viljoen 40'; Deacon Chowles 47'; JP Lewis 58'; Con: Robert du Preez 17', 31', 40', 43', 48' (5/6); Pen: Robert du Preez 24' (1/1); Cards: Robert du Preez (yellow card) 75' | Referee: Federico Anselmi |

Bye/s: Blue Bulls U21

==== Round eleven ====
| 19 September 2014 | Golden Lions U21 | 20–31 | Sharks U21 | Ellis Park Stadium, Johannesburg |
| 16:40 | Try: Damian Engledoe 28'; Selom Gavor 37', 44'; Con: Brandan Hewitt 38' (1/2); Ruan van Rensburg (0/1); Pen: Brandan Hewitt 19' (1/2); Cards: Victor Sekekete (yellow card) 24' to 34'; JP du Preez (yellow card) 40' to 50' | Report; Scoreboard | Try: Alrin Eksteen 15'; Liam O'Connell 36'; Alcino Izaacs 73'; Con: Brendan Cope 16', 37' (2/3); Pen: Brendan Cope 25', 40', 69', 80' (4/4) | Referee: Stuart Berry |

| 20 September 2014 | Leopards U21 | 10–37 | Blue Bulls U21 | Olën Park, Potchefstroom |
| 12:30 | Try: Pikkie Nortjé 51'; Con: Kobus du Plessis 52' (1/1); Pen: Kobus du Plessis 30' (1/2); Cards: Marno Redelinghuys (yellow card) 32' to 42'; Cayle Denner (yellow card) 44' to 54' | Report; Scoreboard | Try: Keagon Gordon 12'; André Warner 34'; Ruan Steenkamp 75'; Ganfried May 78'; Carlo Engelbrecht 80'; Con: Kobus Marais 35' (1/2); Joshua Stander 76', 81' (2/3); Pen: Kobus Marais 3', 60' (2/2) | Referee: Daniel Fortuin |

| 20 September 2014 | Western Province U21 | 91–7 | Border U21 | Newlands Stadium, Cape Town |
| 12:45 | Try: Justin Benn 2'; Lihleli Xoli 6', 79'; Jurie van Vuuren 11'; Andreas Rufus Dercksen 21'; Tapiwa Tsomondo 32', 49'; Luke van der Smit 34'; Kyle Lombard 38'; EW Viljoen 42'; Alva Junior Senderayi 45', 63'; JP Lewis 47' penalty try 71'; WJ Strydom 73'; Con: Chris Smith 12' (1/4); WJ Strydom 33', 35', 39', 46', 50', 72', 80' (7/11) | Report; Scoreboard | Try: Devandré Sissing 29'; Con: Akhona Sihunu 30' (1/1); Cards: Cody Armstrong (yellow card) 72' | Attendance: 100; Referee: Archie Sehlako |

Bye/s: Free State U21

==== Round twelve ====
| 26 September 2014 | Free State U21 | 13–31 | Blue Bulls U21 | Free State Stadium, Bloemfontein |
| 16:40 | Try: Ruan Potgieter 45'; Con: Pieter Jordaan 46' (1/1); Pen: Pieter Jordaan 5', 14' (2/2); Henry Immelman (0/3); Cards: Luan de Bruin (yellow card) 22' to 33' | Report; Scoreboard | Try: Ruan Steenkamp 23'; Ganfried May 46'; Marquit September 51'; Dayan van der Westhuizen 65'; Con: Joshua Stander 67' (1/4); Pen: Joshua Stander 16', 18', 54' (3/4); Cards: Marquit September (yellow card) 32' to 40'; JP Smith (yellow card) 33' to 41' | Attendance: 500; Referee: Francois Pretorius |

| 27 September 2014 | Sharks U21 | 106–3 | Border U21 | Kings Park Stadium, Durban |
| 11:45 | Try: Louis Hazelhurst 2', 20', 71', 79'; Hanco Venter 7'; Buzwe Mpotulo 28', 44'; Jacques Taylor 35'; Barend Potgieter 37'; Brendan Cope 40', 55'; Sipho Mkhize 41'; Michael Cloete 50'; Sabata Mokhachane 62'; Tyler Fisher 65'; Sias Koen 76'; Con: Brendan Cope 8', 21', 29', 36', 38', 40', 45', 51', 56', 66', 72', 77', 80' (13/16) | Report; Scoreboard | Pen: Devandré Sissing 5' (1/1); Cards: Lwando Nteta (yellow card) 32' to 42' | Attendance: 100; Referee: Gerrie de Bruin |

| 27 September 2014 | Leopards U21 | 21–64 | Western Province U21 | Olën Park, Potchefstroom |
| 12:30 | Try: Ryno Pienaar 6'; Jeandré Rudolph 38'; Loftus Morrison 65'; Con: Kobus du Plessis 7', 39', 66' (3/3); Cards: Marnus Tack (yellow card) 49' to 59' | Report; Scoreboard | Try: EW Viljoen 3', 28'; Johnny Kôtze 12', 80'; Dalen Goliath 17', 34'; JP Lewis 23', 42'; Kyle Lombard 50'; Con: Robert du Preez 4', 13', 18', 29', 35', 43', 51', 81' (8/9); Pen: Robert du Preez 56' (1/1) | Attendance: 200; Referee: Stephan Geldenhuys |

Bye/s: Golden Lions U21

==== Round thirteen ====
| 3 October 2014 | Leopards U21 | 10–48 | Golden Lions U21 | Olën Park, Potchefstroom |
| 14:15 | Try: Marnus Tack 10'; Con: Pieter Smith 11' (1/1); Pen: Pieter Smith 6' (1/2); Cards: Jeandré Rudolph (yellow card) 78' | Report; Scoreboard | Try: Pieter Scholtz 36'; Damian Engledoe 44', 28'; Ashlon Davids 56'; Jacques Nel 66'; Harold Vorster 79'; Koch Marx 23'; Con: Ruan van Rensburg 45', 57', 67', 24' (4/6); Brandan Hewitt 80' (1/1); Pen: Ruan van Rensburg 13' (1/1) | Referee: Stephan Geldenhuys |

| 3 October 2014 | Sharks U21 | 10–31 | Blue Bulls U21 | Kings Park Stadium, Durban |
| 16:45 | Try: Khulu Marwana 32'; Jacques Fick 58'; Con: Sandile Kubekha (0/2); Cards: Jacques Fick (yellow card) 46' | Report; Scoreboard | Try: Duncan Matthews 22'; Ruan Steenkamp 35'; Justin Forwood 55'; Kefentse Mahlo 73'; Con: Joshua Stander 23', 36', 56', 74' (4/4); Pen: Joshua Stander 66' (1/1) | Attendance: 100; Referee: Oregopotse Rametsi |

| 4 October 2014 | Free State U21 | 18–39 | Western Province U21 | Free State Stadium, Bloemfontein |
| 11:40 | Try: Henry Immelman 25'; Carel-Jan Coetzee 48'; Con: Pieter Jordaan 49' (1/2); Pen: Pieter Jordaan 22', 51' (2/2); Drop: Henry Immelman (0/1) | Report; Scoreboard | Try: Eital Bredenkamp 5', 79'; Johnny Kôtze 38'; John-Hubert Meyer 44'; EW Viljoen 64'; Con: Robert du Preez 6', 39', 45', 65' (4/5); Pen: Robert du Preez 19', 28' (2/2) | Attendance: 500; Referee: Rodney Boneparte |

Bye/s: Border U21

==== Round fourteen ====
| 10 October 2014 | Border U21 | 7–123 | Blue Bulls U21 | Buffalo City Stadium, East London |
| 18:00 | Try: Akhona Sihunu 76'; Con: Devandré Sissing 76' (1/1); Cards: Siyanda Nombombo (yellow card) 63' to 73' | Report; Scoreboard | Try: Nqoba Mxoli 1', 22'; Chris Massyn 4', 33', 53'; Kobus Marais 12', 48'; Dan Kriel 16'; Wilco Louw 24'; Keagon Gordon 27', 69'; Kefentse Mahlo 29', 42'; Jacques Rossouw 55'; Andrew Beerwinkel 58'; Desmond Stramis 64'; Leighton van Wyk 66'; Ganfried May 70'; Impi Visser 79'; Con: Kobus Marais 1', 4', 13', 17', 30', 33', 42', 46' (8/11); Jacques Rossouw 53', 55', 58', 64', 66', 70' (6/8) | Attendance: 200; Referee: Cwengile Jadezweni |

| 11 October 2014 | Golden Lions U21 | 10–20 | Free State U21 | Ellis Park Stadium, Johannesburg |
| 13:00 | Try: Cyle Brink 25', 80'; Con: Ruan van Rensburg (0/1); Brandan Hewitt (0/1); Cards: Brandan Hewitt (yellow card) 56' to 66'; Malcolm Marx (yellow card) 56' to 66' | Report; Scoreboard | Try: Marco Klopper 28'; Carel-Jan Coetzee 69'; Con: Henry Immelman 29' (1/1); Pieter Jordaan 70' (1/1); Pen: Henry Immelman 19' (1/2); Pieter Jordaan 68' (1/2); Cards: Marco Klopper (yellow card) 47' to 57' | Referee: Francois Pretorius |

| 11 October 2014 | Western Province U21 | 51–32 | Sharks U21 | Newlands Stadium, Cape Town |
| 14:45 | Try: WJ Strydom 25'; Tapiwa Tsomondo 42', 52', 59', 65'; Jacques van Staden 67'; SP Ferreira 71'; Devon Nash 82'; Con: WJ Strydom 26', 60' (2/4); Brandon Thomson 68', 83' (2/4); Pen: WJ Strydom 16' (1/2) | Report; Scoreboard | Try: Michael Cloete 5'; Tyler Fisher 18'; Khulu Marwana 35'; Sandile Kubekha 45'; Johan Meyer 57'; Con: Tim Swiel 46', 58' (2/5); Pen: Tim Swiel 33' (1/1); Cards: Sandile Kubekha (yellow card) 65' to 75'; Hanco Venter (yellow card) 68' to 78'; Jacques Fick (yellow card) 81' | Referee: Lourens van der Merwe |

Bye/s: Leopards U21

==== Semi-finals ====
| 17 October 2014 | Blue Bulls U21 | 23–19 | Golden Lions U21 | Loftus Versfeld, Pretoria |
| 15:00 | Try: Joshua Stander 8'; Rohan Janse van Rensburg 48'; Con: Joshua Stander 9', 49' (2/2); Pen: Joshua Stander 30', 58', 64' (3/5); Cards: Jan Enslin (yellow card) 60' to 72' | Report; Scoreboard | Try: JP du Preez 19'; Malcolm Marx 36'; Koch Marx 41'; Con: Ruan van Rensburg 20', 37' (2/3); Cards: Pieter Scholtz (yellow card) 29' to 39' | Attendance: 1,000; Referee: Quinton Immelman |

| 18 October 2014 | Western Province U21 | 41–17 | Free State U21 | Newlands Stadium, Cape Town |
| 14:30 | Try: Kyle Lombard 52'; Justin Geduld 68'; WJ Strydom 79'; Mike Willemse 8'; Johnny Kôtze 31'; Jan Uys 37'; Con: Robert du Preez 69', 9', 32', 38' (4/5); Huw Jones (0/1); Pen: Robert du Preez 35' (1/1) | Report; Scoreboard | Try: Jan-Francois Bester 76'; Hennie Theron 49'; Con: Henry Immelman 50' (1/1); Ruan Potgieter 77' (1/1); Pen: Marx Bornman 39' (1/1); Henry Immelman (0/1) | Referee: Rodney Boneparte |

==== Final ====
| 25 October 2014 | Western Province U21 | 10–20 | Blue Bulls U21 | Newlands Stadium, Cape Town |
| 14:00 | Try: Robert du Preez 56'; Con: Robert du Preez 57' (1/1); Pen: Robert du Preez 10' (1/2) | Report; Scoreboard | Try: Ruan Steenkamp 70'; Jesse Kriel 77'; Con: Kobus Marais 71', 77' (2/2); Pen: Joshua Stander 7', 26' (2/3); Drop: Joshua Stander (0/1) | Referee: Pro Legoete |

=== Honours ===
2014 Under-21 Provincial Championship
Group A Champions

== Group B ==
=== Competition ===
There were eight participating teams in the 2014 Under-21 Provincial Championship Group B. These teams played each other once over the course of the season, either at home or away.

Teams received four points for a win and two points for a draw. Bonus points were awarded to teams that scored 4 or more tries in a game, as well as to teams that lost a match by 7 points or less. Teams were ranked by points, then points difference (points scored less points conceded).

The top 4 teams qualified for the title play-offs. In the semi-finals, the team that finished first had home advantage against the team that finished fourth, while the team that finished second had home advantage against the team that finished third. The winners of these semi-finals played each other in the final, at the same venue as the 2014 Currie Cup First Division Final.

The winner of the final played a play-off game away from home against the bottom team in Group A for a place in the 2015 Under-21 Provincial Championship Group A.

=== Teams ===
Location of teams in 2014 Under-21 Provincial Championship Group B

==== Team listing ====
The following teams took part in the 2014 Under-21 Provincial Championship Group B competition:

2014 Under-21 Provincial Championship Group B teams
| Team | Stadium/s |
| Boland U21 | Boland Stadium, Wellington |
| Eastern Province U21 | Nelson Mandela Bay Stadium, Port Elizabeth |
| Falcons U21 | Barnard Stadium, Kempton Park |
| Griquas U21 | Griqua Park, Kimberley |
| Griffons U21 | North West Stadium, Welkom |
| Limpopo Blue Bulls U21 | Peter Mokaba Stadium, Polokwane |
| Pumas U21 | Mbombela Stadium, Mbombela |
| SWD U21 | Outeniqua Park, George |

=== Log ===
The final log of the round-robin stage of the 2014 under-21 provincial championship group B is:

2014 Under-21 Provincial Championship Group B log
| Pos | Team | Pld | W | D | L | PF | PA | PD | TF | TA | TB | LB | Pts | Qualification |
|---|---|---|---|---|---|---|---|---|---|---|---|---|---|---|
| 1 | Eastern Province U21 | 7 | 7 | 0 | 0 | 261 | 90 | +171 | 35 | 12 | 6 | 0 | 34 | Semi-finals and promotion/relegation play-offs |
| 2 | Boland U21 | 7 | 6 | 0 | 1 | 305 | 162 | +143 | 47 | 23 | 6 | 0 | 30 | Qualified for the semi-finals |
| 3 | SWD U21 | 7 | 5 | 0 | 2 | 202 | 171 | +31 | 27 | 22 | 3 | 0 | 23 | Qualified for the semi-finals |
| 4 | Limpopo Blue Bulls U21 | 7 | 3 | 0 | 4 | 230 | 177 | +53 | 37 | 24 | 5 | 3 | 20 | Qualified for the semi-finals |
| 5 | Griquas U21 | 7 | 3 | 0 | 4 | 136 | 190 | −54 | 18 | 28 | 2 | 2 | 16 | |
| 6 | Falcons U21 | 7 | 3 | 0 | 4 | 173 | 212 | −39 | 23 | 30 | 2 | 1 | 15 | |
| 7 | Pumas U21 | 7 | 1 | 0 | 6 | 136 | 212 | −76 | 21 | 31 | 2 | 1 | 7 | |
| 8 | Griffons U21 | 7 | 0 | 0 | 7 | 133 | 362 | −229 | 17 | 55 | 0 | 1 | 1 | |

Rules for classification: 4 points for a win, 2 points for a draw, 1 bonus point for a loss by seven points or less, 1 bonus point for scoring four or more tries in a match

=== Fixtures and results ===
- Fixtures are subject to change.
- All times are South African (GMT+2).

==== Round one ====
| 9 August 2014 | Griffons U21 | 15–20 | Griquas U21 | North West Stadium, Welkom |
| 15:30 | Try: Rabelani Mukhuthu 44'; Jacques le Roux 68'; Con: Malcolm-Kerr Till 44', 69' (2/2); Pen: Malcolm-Kerr Till 20', 25' (2/3); Drop: Malcolm-Kerr Till (0/1) | Report; Scoreboard | Try: Ruan Booyse 22'; Mokutu Molelekoa 53'; Con: Jeandre Louw (0/1); Ruan Booyse 43' (1/1); Pen: Jeandre Louw (0/1); Ruan Booyse 29' (1/2) | Attendance: 200; Referee: Rodney Boneparte |

| 9 August 2014 | Pumas U21 | 20–36 | SWD U21 | Mbombela Stadium, Mbombela |
| 16:20 | Try: Pieter Kruger 66'; Wian van Schalkwyk 75'; Willem Kotze 80'; Con: Ruben Carelse (0/2); Marius Scheepers 80' (1/1); Pen: Ruben Carelse 63' (1/1) | Report; Scoreboard | Try: Dillin Snel 22'; Fizell Fredericks 26', 33'; Marcelino Marais 58'; Kirsten Heyns 73'; Con: Fizell Fredericks 22', 26', 59', 73' (4/5); Pen: Fizell Fredericks 5' (1/3) |

| 9 August 2014 | Falcons U21 | 22–42 | Eastern Province U21 | Barnard Stadium, Kempton Park |
| 15:00 | Try: Marius Breytenbach 29'; Koos Bosman 39'; Andries Schutte 62'; Angus Cleophas 79'; Con: Kyle Hilton 30' (1/2); Wayne Gardner (0/2) | Report; Scoreboard | Try: Selvyn Davids 15', 19'; Sphu Msutwana 24'; Sergeal Petersen 32'; Aya Dlepu 35', 65'; Con: MC Venter 16', 33', 36' (3/6); Pen: MC Venter 3', 13' (2/2); Cards: Claude Tshidibi (yellow card) 49' to 59' | Referee: Daniel Fortuin |

Bye/s: Boland U21, Limpopo Blue Bulls U21

==== Round two ====
| 15 August 2014 | Boland U21 | 48–17 | Griquas U21 | Boland Stadium, Wellington |
| 16:00 | Try: Arno Fortuin 16', 23'; Wilneth Engelbrecht 31'; Ryno Conradie 38'; Harlon Klaasen 46', 59', 69', 75'; Con: Ryno Conradie 17', 24', 32' (3/7); Chad Kleinsmidt 75' (1/1); Pen: Ryno Conradie (0/1); Cards: Jos Malherbe (yellow card) 50' to 60'; Daniel Griebenauw (yellow card) 74' | Report; Scoreboard | Try: Herman Wepener 52', 79'; Deon Taljaard 56'; Con: Jeandré Louw 53' (1/2); Christo Coetzee (0/1); Pen: Jeandré Louw (0/1) | Referee: Tahla Ntshakaza |

| 16 August 2014 | Griffons U21 | 7–59 | Eastern Province U21 | North West Stadium, Welkom |
| 14:30 | Try: Bren Marais 70'; Con: Reynardt Muller 71' (1/1) | Report; Scoreboard | Try: Sergeal Petersen 5', 20'; Selvyn Davids 13', 65'; Ivan-John du Preez 22'; Mario Mowers 26'; Sphu Msutwana 43', 59'; Kevin Kaba 79'; Con: MC Venter 14', 23', 27', 44', 60', 66', 80' (7/9) | Attendance: 200; Referee: Oregopotse Rametsi |

| 16 August 2014 | Limpopo Blue Bulls U21 | 17–20 | SWD U21 | Peter Mokaba Stadium, Polokwane |
| 15:00 | Try: Jovan Cookson 10'; Wolta Mtsweni 35'; Con: Kyran Odendaal 11', 36' (2/2); Pen: Kyran Odendaal 27' (1/1) | Report; Scoreboard | Try: Andisa Ntsila 23'; Neceedo Pietersen 70'; Con: Fizell Fredericks 24' (1/1); Leighton Eksteen 71' (1/1); Pen: Leighton Eksteen 50', 56' (2/2) | Referee: Jaco Kotze |

| 16 August 2014 | Pumas U21 | 10–18 | Falcons U21 | Puma Stadium, Witbank |
| 15:00 | Try: Joe Herrmann 71'; Con: Juandré Schmidt 72' (1/1); Pen: Ruben Carelse 6' (1/4) | Report; Scoreboard | Try: Etienne Taljaard 29'; Lukhanyo Am 56'; Con: Lenience Tambwera (0/1); Angus Cleophas 57' (1/1); Pen: Lenience Tambwera 10' (1/1); Angus Cleophas 76' (1/1); Cards: Anthony Kapp (yellow card) 36' to 46'; Ian Oosthuizen (yellow card) 70' | Referee: Stephan Geldenhuys |

==== Round three ====
| 22 August 2014 | SWD U21 | 66–20 | Griffons U21 | Outeniqua Park, George |
| 17:15 | Try: Leighton Eksteen 1'; Nathan Gogela 14'; Juandré Fourie 16'; Fizell Fredericks 23', 39', 72'; Kirsten Heyns 27'; Brianton Booysen 43'; Bradley Jumaats 65'; Raeez Salie 77'; Con: Leighton Eksteen 15', 17', 24', 28', 39', 44', 73', 78' (8/10); Drop: Leighton Eksteen (0/1); Cards: Achmad Salie (yellow card) 41' to 55' | Report; Scoreboard | Try: Dean Rossouw 45'; Freddie Wepener 67'; Rabelani Mukhuthu 74'; Con: Reynardt Muller 68' (1/3); Pen: Reynardt Muller 7' (1/1) | Attendance: 150; Referee: Jaco Pretorius |

| 22 August 2014 | Eastern Province U21 | 23–3 | Boland U21 | Central Grounds, Uitenhage |
| 19:00 | Try: Siphesihle Punguzwa 55'; Sergeal Petersen 75'; Claude Tshidibi 78'; Con: MC Venter 56' (1/2); Selvyn Davids (0/1); Pen: MC Venter 3', 45' (2/2); Cards: Ivan-John du Preez (yellow card) 65' | Report; Scoreboard | Pen: Anzo Stubbs (0/1); Ryno Conradie 34' (1/2); Cards: Erik Meyer (yellow card) 42' to 53' | Referee: Daniel Fortuin |

| 23 August 2014 | Falcons U21 | 17–51 | Limpopo Blue Bulls U21 | Barnard Stadium, Kempton Park |
| 15:00 | Try: Koos Bosman 24'; Riaan Matthee 47'; Angus Cleophas 72'; Con: Litha Vumisa (0/1); Angus Cleophas 73' (1/2); Pen: Lenience Tambwera (0/1); Cards: Koos Bosman (yellow card) 54' to 64' | Report; Scoreboard | Try: Philippus Pretorius 12'; Jovan Cookson 27'; Stephanus Smith 29', 44'; Petrus Grobler 62'; Oskar Calitz 69', 76'; Wolta Mtsweni 80'; Con: Kyran Odendaal 12' (1/3); Jean Grobler 45', 77', 81' (3/4); Marcel Steyn-Scholtz (0/1); Pen: Kyran Odendaal 6' (1/1); Cards: Jean Grobler (yellow card) 19' | Referee: Stephan Geldenhuys |

Bye/s: Griquas U21, Pumas U21

==== Round four ====
| 30 August 2014 | Griquas U21 | 6–28 | Falcons U21 | Griqua Park, Kimberley |
| 12:00 | Pen: Deon Klein 9', 25' (2/4); Cards: Ian Smith (yellow card) 22' to 32' | Report; Scoreboard | Try: David Woolls 38'; George van Niekerk 63'; Johan Gericke 79'; Con: Angus Cleophas 63' (1/2); Kyle Hilton 80' (1/1); Pen: Angus Cleophas 12', 20', 45' (3/4) | Attendance: 1,000; Referee: Jaco Kotze |

| 30 August 2014 | Boland U21 | 45–31 | Pumas U21 | Boland Stadium, Wellington |
| 14:00 | Try: Valentino Wellman 1', 15', 52', 56'; Harlon Klaasen 3'; Jos Malherbe 27'; Willbur Boonzaaier 80'; Con: Ryno Conradie 2', 16', 28', 53' (4/6); Willbur Boonzaaier 81' (1/1); Cards: Byran Matthews (yellow card) 39' to 53' | Report; Scoreboard | Try: Elandré Botha 5'; Wian van Schalkwyk 8', 46'; Joe Herrmann 34'; Henry Badenhorst 67'; Con: Juan-dre Schmidt 6', 35', 47' (3/5); Cards: Pieter Kruger (yellow card) 22' to 32' | Referee: Cwengile Jadezweni |

| 30 August 2014 | Eastern Province U21 | 36–21 | Limpopo Blue Bulls U21 | Nelson Mandela Bay Stadium, Port Elizabeth |
| 16:30 | Try: Sergeal Petersen 6'; Ivan-John du Preez 38'; Selvyn Davids 64', 69'; Sphu Msutwana 72'; Con: MC Venter 7', 39', 65', 73' (4/5); Pen: MC Venter 4' (1/1); Cards: MC Venter (yellow card) 20' to 30' | Report; Scoreboard | Try: Jean Grobler 14'; Jovan Cookson 21'; Jean Volkwyn 28'; Con: Jean Grobler 15', 22', 29' (3/3); Pen: Jean Grobler (0/1); Cards: Juan van der Westhuizen (yellow card) 33' to 43'; Pieter Kruger (yellow card) 37' to 47' | Attendance: 500; Referee: Francois Pretorius |

Bye/s: Griffons U21, SWD U21

==== Round five ====
| 6 September 2014 | Griffons U21 | 18–84 | Boland U21 | North West Stadium, Welkom |
| 13:15 | Try: Christiaan Pelser 53'; Malcolm-Kerr Till 64'; Con: Werner Barnard 65' (1/2); Pen: Werner Barnard 10', 26' (2/3); Reynardt Muller (0/1) | Report; Scoreboard | Try: Anzo Stubbs 3', 15'; Willbur Boonzaaier 7'; Hewson Petersen 17'; Ryno Conradie 36'; Harlon Klaasen 42'; Francois Basson 49', 56'; Chad Kleinsmidt 51', 60'; Jos Malherbe 73'; Valentino Wellman 77', 80'; Con: Willbur Boonzaaier 4', 8', 16', 37', 52', 57', 74' (7/10); Ryno Conradie (0/1); Shane Pretorius 81' (1/1); Pen: Willbur Boonzaaier 39' (1/2) | Referee: Stephan Geldenhuys |

| 6 September 2014 | Falcons U21 | 26–30 | SWD U21 | Barnard Stadium, Kempton Park |
| 13:30 | Try: Koos Bosman 64'; Andries Schutte 76'; Con: Gabriel du Toit 65', 77' (2/2); Pen: Kyle Hilton 18' (1/1); Angus Cleophas 33', 55', 61' (3/4); Cards: De Wet Meyer (yellow card) 28' | Report; Scoreboard | Try: Eldred James 5'; Andisa Ntsila 21'; Dillin Snel 57'; Kirsten Heyns 72'; Con: Lee-Roy Pojie 22' (1/2); Eldred James 58' (1/2); Pen: Lee-Roy Pojie 2', 12' (2/3); Cards: Ethan Williams (red card) 9' | Referee: Quinton Immelman |

| 6 September 2014 | Eastern Province U21 | 36–10 | Pumas U21 | SAPS Club Field, Port Elizabeth |
| 15:00 | Try: Frans Gerber 16'; Sonwabo Majola 34' penalty try 58'; Sinethemba Skelem 63'; Selvyn Davids 77'; Con: MC Venter 17', 35', 59' (3/3); Juan Smit 64' (1/2); Pen: MC Venter 52' (1/2); Cards: Brendan Hector (yellow card) 47' to 57' | Report; Scoreboard | Try: Henry Badenhorst 10'; Wian van Schalkwyk 74'; Con: Ruben Carelse (0/2); Cards: Steven Jacobs (yellow card) 51' to 61' | Referee: Archie Sehlako |

| 6 September 2014 | Limpopo Blue Bulls U21 | 29–33 | Griquas U21 | Piet Potgieter HS, Mokopane |
| 15:00 | Try: Stephanus Smith 17', 49'; Wolta Mtsweni 36'; Jean Grobler 46'; Jovan Cookson 64'; Con: Jean Grobler 18' (1/4); Roy-Ramon Auret 65' (1/1); Cards: Robey Leibrandt (yellow card) 13' to 23'; Pieter Kruger (yellow card) 41' to 51' | Report; Scoreboard | Try: Shaun Clarke 15', 42'; Phillip Barwise 22'; Nicolaas Steyn 31'; Hillford Clarke 66'; Con: Christo Coetzee 16', 67' (2/3); Jeandre Louw 23', 32' (2/2); Pen: Christo Coetzee (0/2) | Referee: Tahla Ntshakaza |

==== Round six ====
| 12 September 2014 | SWD U21 | 6–37 | Eastern Province U21 | Outeniqua Park, George |
| 17:00 | Pen: Fizell Fredericks 10', 37' (2/3) | Report; Scoreboard | Try: Nic Roebeck 23'; Frans Gerber 34'; Ivan-John du Preez 59'; Selvyn Davids 62'; Con: Selvyn Davids 24', 35', 60', 63' (4/4); Pen: Selvyn Davids 4', 14', 47' (3/3); Cards: Stephan Zaayman (yellow card) 64' to 74'; Warrick Venter (yellow card) 65' to 75' | Referee: Jaco Kotze |

| 13 September 2014 | Griquas U21 | 22–20 | Pumas U21 | Griqua Park, Kimberley |
| 12:00 | Try: Herman Wepener 29', 70'; Hubert de Haas 36'; Francois de Kock 77'; Con: Christo Coetzee 37' (1/3); Cards: Luxolo Koza (yellow card) 34' to 44' | Report; Scoreboard | Try: Pule Sibiya 38'; Theo Kruger 60'; Steven Jacobs 63'; Elandré Botha 72'; Con: Juan-dre Schmidt (0/3); Ruben Carelse (0/1); Pen: Juan-dre Schmidt (0/1) | Referee: Rodney Boneparte |

| 13 September 2014 | Boland U21 | 53–15 | Falcons U21 | Boland Stadium, Wellington |
| 14:00 | Try: Harlon Klaasen 9', 22'; Francois Basson 38'; Benley-Mark Visagie 46'; Wilneth Engelbrecht 57', 74'; Valentino Wellman 63'; Arno Fortuin 66'; Con: Ryno Conradie 23', 39', 47', 64', 75' (5/8); Pen: Ryno Conradie 18' (1/1) | Report; Scoreboard | Try: Divan Binneman 20'; Johan Gericke 36'; Con: Angus Cleophas 21' (1/2); Pen: Angus Cleophas 15' (1/1) | Attendance: 300; Referee: Francois Pretorius |

| 13 September 2014 | Limpopo Blue Bulls U21 | 46–28 | Griffons U21 | Peter Mokaba Stadium, Polokwane |
| 15:00 | Try: Corné Ras 2', 26'; Kyran Odendaal 8'; Michael van Damme 15'; Wolta Mtsweni 17'; Primo Ncube 19'; Oskar Calitz 30', 45'; Con: Jean Grobler 16' (1/4); Kyran Odendaal 20', 27' (2/4); Cards: Stephanus Smith (red card) 53' | Report; Scoreboard | Try: Freddie Wepener 34', 71'; Rabelani Mukhuthu 75'; Con: Werner Barnard (0/1); Malcolm-Kerr Till 72' (1/1); Reynardt Muller 76' (1/1); Pen: Werner Barnard 10' (1/1); Reynardt Muller 28', 39' (2/2) | Referee: Eduan Nel |

==== Round seven ====
| 20 September 2014 | Eastern Province U21 | 28–21 | Griquas U21 | Nelson Mandela Bay Stadium, Port Elizabeth |
| 12:30 | Try: Sonwabo Majola 5'; Khaya Malotana 43'; Vukile Sofisa 47'; Aidon Davis 52'; Con: Selvyn Davids 6', 44', 48', 53' (4/4); Cards: Stephan Zaayman (yellow card) 69' | Report; Scoreboard | Try: Stephan Malan 18'; Hillford Clarke 75'; Con: Christo Coetzee 19' (1/2); Pen: Christo Coetzee 4', 13', 39' (3/3) | Attendance: 500; Referee: Jaco Pretorius |

| 20 September 2014 | Falcons U21 | 47–20 | Griffons U21 | Barnard Stadium, Kempton Park |
| 12:45 | Try: David Woolls 3', 21', 78'; Gary Woolls 38'; Ryan Carmichael 46'; Johan Gericke 61'; Andries Schutte 74'; Con: Angus Cleophas 22', 29', 47' (3/7); Pen: Angus Cleophas 11', 29' (2/3); Cards: Etienne Taljaard (yellow card) 31' to 42' | Report; Scoreboard | Try: Bren Marais 1'; Dean Rossouw 32'; Andy Jones 54'; Con: Jacques le Roux 33' (1/2); Malcolm-Kerr Till (0/1); Pen: Jacques le Roux 19' (1/1) | Attendance: 100; Referee: Cwengile Jadezweni |

| 20 September 2014 | Pumas U21 | 5–30 | Limpopo Blue Bulls U21 | Kees Taljaard Stadium, Middelburg |
| 15:00 | Try: Winsin Theron | Report; Scoreboard | Try: Visscher Strydom; Jovan Cookson; Stephanus Smith; Corné Ras; Primo Ncube | Referee: Oregopotse Rametsi |

| 20 September 2014 | SWD U21 | 22–34 | Boland U21 | Outeniqua Park, George |
| 15:00 | Try: Dillin Snel 10'; Raeez Salie 48'; Fizell Fredericks 67'; Con: Fizell Fredericks 11', 49' (2/3); Pen: Fizell Fredericks 27' (1/1) | Report; Scoreboard | Try: Thurlow Marsh 7'; Harlon Klaasen 43'; Chad Kleinsmidt 51', 65'; Daniel Griebenauw 56'; Valentino Wellman 78'; Con: Willbur Boonzaaier 44' (1/4); Arno Fortuin 79' (1/2) | Referee: Christie du Preez |

==== Round eight ====
| 26 September 2014 | Boland U21 | 38–36 | Limpopo Blue Bulls U21 | Boland Stadium, Wellington |
| 14:00 | Try: Harlon Klaasen 20', 26', 73', 77'; Francois Basson 51'; Chad Kleinsmidt 78'; Con: Ryno Conradie 27', 52' (2/3); Willbur Boonzaaier 78', 79' (2/3); Pen: Ryno Conradie (0/2); Cards: Daniel Griebenauw (yellow card) 48' to 58' | Report; Scoreboard | Try: Juan van der Westhuizen 6'; Oskar Calitz 37'; Philippus Pretorius 49'; Wolta Mtsweni 61', 71'; Con: Jean Grobler 7', 38', 62', 72' (4/5); Pen: Jean Grobler 40' (1/1); Cards: Piet-Louw Strauss (yellow card) 74' | Referee: Lusanda Jam |

| 26 September 2014 | Pumas U21 | 40–25 | Griffons U21 | Mbombela Stadium, Mbombela |
| 16:20 | Try: Winsin Theron 4', 61'; Elandré Botha 31', 76'; Jacques Oosthuizen 47'; Johannes Willer 55'; Con: Jacques Oosthuizen 5', 48', 56', 62' (4/5); Juan-dre Schmidt 77' (1/1); Cards: Lindokuhle Sambo (red card) 51' | Report; Scoreboard | Try: Reynardt Muller 22'; Christiaan Pelser 66'; Sheldon Erasmus 78'; Con: Reynardt Muller 23' (1/1); Sheldon Erasmus 67' (1/2); Pen: Reynardt Muller 14', 27' (2/3); Cards: Jacques le Roux (yellow card) 44'; Tiaan Lamprecht (yellow card) 55' to 65' | Attendance: 350; Referee: Christie du Preez |

| 27 September 2014 | Griquas U21 | 17–22 | SWD U21 | Griqua Park, Kimberley |
| 12:30 | Try: Hillford Clarke 37'; Shaun Clarke 48'; Con: Christo Coetzee 38', 49' (2/2); Pen: Christo Coetzee 10' (1/1); Hillford Clarke (0/1); Cards: Phillip Barwise (yellow card) 30' to 41' | Report; Scoreboard | Try: Dillin Snel 28'; Juandré Fourie 59'; Kirsten Heyns 67'; Con: Eldred James 29' (1/1); Lee-Roy Pojie 60' (1/2); Pen: Eldred James 24' (1/1); Cards: Joshwine Cornelius (yellow card) 47' to 57' | Referee: Oregopotse Rametsi |

Bye/s: Eastern Province U21, Falcons U21

==== Semi-finals ====
| 3 October 2014 | Eastern Province U21 | 28–26 | Limpopo Blue Bulls U21 | Framesby High School, Port Elizabeth |
| 15:00 | Try: Sergeal Petersen 4'; Riaan Esterhuizen 18'; Selvyn Davids 28'; Con: Selvyn Davids 5', 19' (2/3); Pen: Selvyn Davids 16', 34', 40' (3/3); Cards: CJ Velleman (yellow card) 67' to 77' | Report; Scoreboard | Try: Oskar Calitz 11'; Jovan Cookson 31'; Corné Ras 70'; Wolta Mtsweni 74'; Con: Jean Grobler 12', 32', 75' (3/4); Cards: Stephanus Smith (yellow card) 39' to 49' | Attendance: 250; Referee: Eduan Nel |

| 4 October 2014 | Boland U21 | 33–40 | SWD U21 | Boland Stadium, Wellington |
| 14:00 | Try: Harlon Klaasen 3', 22'; Tiaan Ramat 48'; Thurlow Marsh 59'; Chaney Willemse 73'; Con: Ryno Conradie 4', 23', 49', 60' (4/5) | Report; Scoreboard | Try: Lee-Roy Pojie 35'; Neceedo Pietersen 51'; Andisa Ntsila 55'; Creswin Josephs 79'; Con: Fizell Fredericks 36', 52', 56' (3/3); Neceedo Pietersen 80' (1/1); Pen: Fizell Fredericks 1', 11' (2/4); Neceedo Pietersen 65', 76' (2/3); Drop: Neceedo Pietersen (0/1) | Attendance: 250; Referee: Gerrie de Bruin |

==== Final ====
| 17 October 2014 | Eastern Province U21 | 46–3 | SWD U21 | North West Stadium, Welkom |
| 13:00 | Try: Franswa Ueckermann 20'; Sphu Msutwana 23'; Selvyn Davids 48'; Sergeal Petersen 49'; CJ Velleman 52'; Aidon Davis 60'; Con: Selvyn Davids 21', 24', 48', 50', 60' (5/6); Pen: Selvyn Davids 26', 7' (2/2) | Report; Scoreboard | Pen: Leighton Eksteen 5' (1/2); Drop: Leighton Eksteen (0/1) | Attendance: 200; Referee: Archie Sehlako |

=== Honours ===
2014 Under-21 Provincial Championship
Group B Champions
Eastern Province U21

== Promotion/relegation play-off ==
| 24 October 2014 | Border U21 | 9–64 | Eastern Province U21 | Buffalo City Stadium, East London |
| 18:00 | Pen: Devandré Sissing 7', 30', 35' (3/5) | Scoreboard | Try: Aidon Davis 20'; Selvyn Davids 26'; CJ Velleman 33', 42'; Malcolm Jaer 37'; Sergeal Petersen 44', 47'; Stephan Zaayman 56'; Warren Swarts 75'; Jaco Bernardo 80'; Con: Selvyn Davids 21', 27', 34', 43', 45', 57', 76' (7/9); Sergeal Petersen (0/1); Cards: Aidon Davis (yellow card) 35' to 45'; Malcolm Jaer (yellow card) 54' to 64' | Attendance: 300; Referee: Francois Pretorius |

- Eastern Province U21 were promoted to 2015 Under-21 Provincial Championship Group A.
- Border U21 were relegated to 2015 Under-21 Provincial Championship Group B.

== See also ==
- 2014 Currie Cup Premier Division
- 2014 Currie Cup qualification
- 2014 Currie Cup First Division
- 2014 Vodacom Cup
- 2014 Under-19 Provincial Championship
