= Tim Swiel =

English-born South African rugby union player (born 1993)

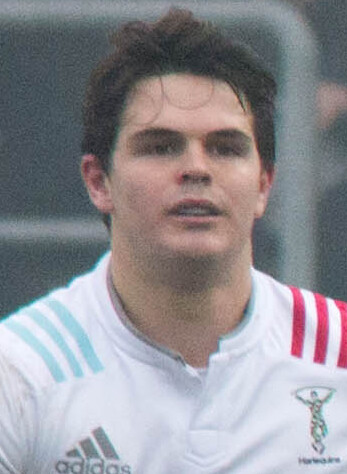
- Full name: Timothy Gregory Swiel
- Born: 4 June 1993 (age 33) Taunton, England
- Height: 1.81 m (5 ft 11 1/2 in)
- Weight: 88 kg (13 st 12 lb; 194 lb)
- School: Diocesan College, Dulwich College
- University: The Open University, University of Western States

Rugby union career
- Position: Fly-half / Full-back
Youth career
- 2009–2013: Western Province
Senior career
Years	Team	Apps	(Points)
2013	Western Province	9	(19)
2014	Sharks XV	5	(53)
2014	Sharks	6	(38)
2014	Sharks (Currie Cup)	3	(0)
2014–2015	→ Harlequins	10	(75)
2015–2018	Harlequins	38	(153)
2018–2020	Newcastle Falcons	13	(23)
2020–2022	Stormers	14	(56)
2020–2022	Western Province	29	(290)
2022–2023	Toyota Shokki	11	(101)
2023–2024	Edinburgh	3	(5)
2024	Saracens	3	(36)
2025	Chicago Hounds	12	(13)
2026	Sharks (Currie Cup)	7	(38)
- Correct as of 10 September 2026
International career
Years	Team	Apps	(Points)
2011	South Africa Schools	1	(11)
- Correct as of 18 October 2014

Timothy Gregory Swiel (born 4 June 1993) is an English-born South African rugby union player. His regular position is fly-half.

== Career ==
=== Youth ===
Swiel attended Bishops in Cape Town and played in their first side in 2010 and 2011 alongside Dillyn Leyds, Oli Kebble and Johnny Kôtze. As part of an exchange programme, Swiel also played for English school side Dulwich College during the 2009–2010 season.

Swiel represented Western Province at Under-16 level at the 2009 Grant Khomo Week and at Under-18 level at the 2010 Academy Week and 2011 Craven Week tournaments, leading to his inclusion in the South Africa Schools side in 2011.

Swiel also played for the Western Province U21 team in the 2012 Under-21 Provincial Championship – scoring 81 points, with one try, to finish joint seventh in the scoring charts in 14 games – and 2013 Under-21 Provincial Championship competitions – scoring 180 points including 5 tries in 13 games.

=== Western Province ===
His senior debut came during the 2013 Vodacom Cup competition, coming on as a substitute in Western Province 17–17 draw against Boland Cavaliers in Ceres. Seven more appearances followed in that competition.

Swiel was then included in the Western Province's Currie Cup squad for the 2013 Currie Cup Premier Division competition and made his Currie Cup debut against the Golden Lions, which also ended in a draw, the final score being 31–31.

=== Sharks ===
Swiel joined the Sharks at the conclusion of the 2013 Currie Cup Premier Division season. He played in five matches for the Sharks XV in the 2014 Vodacom Cup competition, finishing as top-scorer for his team with 53 points.

Swiel was also included in the Sharks squad for the 2014 Super Rugby season. He made his Super Rugby debut, replacing Patrick Lambie in the sixth minute of the Sharks' match against the Bulls in Pretoria. He scored his first points in Super Rugby just three minutes after coming on, converting a Willem Alberts try. A month later, Swiel made his first start in Super Rugby in their home match against the Cheetahs. He made his second start the following week, where he scored all his side's points in an 18–34 defeat to the Highlanders. Swiel made a total of six appearances during the season and scored 38 points as his side finished top of the South African Conference before losing to the Crusaders in the semi-final.

In September 2014, Swiel made his Currie Cup debut, playing off the bench in their match against Griquas. He started their next match against the Free State Cheetahs in Bloemfontein and also played against the Eastern Province Kings. In addition to his three Currie Cup appearances, he also played for the Sharks U21 side on six occasions during the 2014 Under-21 Provincial Championship, scoring 38 points.

=== Harlequins ===
In October 2014, English Premiership side Harlequins signed Swiel as short-term injury cover for Ben Botica.

Swiel made his debut for Harlequins in their LV= Cup match against Saracens, coming on as a second-half substitute. He made his starting debut a week later against the Newport Gwent Dragons in the same competition. After making his Premiership debut against Bath, he also made his debut in the European Rugby Champions Cup, playing in both legs against Irish side Leinster, as they finished third and failed to qualify for the knockout stage.

Swiel made a total of ten appearances for Harlequins during his loan spell – starting five of those matches – and scored 75 points before returning to the Sharks before Round Three of the 2015 Super Rugby season.

In April 2015, Harlequins announced that Swiel would return to the club on a full-time deal for the 2015–2016 season.

=== Newcastle Falcons ===
In 2018, Swiel signed for Premiership rivals Newcastle Falcons ahead of the 2018–19 season.

=== Stormers ===
On 26 May 2020, Swiel returned to South Africa to sign for Stormers.

=== Toyota Shokki ===
Swiel spent the 2022-2023 season with Toyota Shokki in Japan's Rugby League One – Division 2.

=== Edinburgh ===
Swiel joined Edinburgh Rugby in August 2023 on a short-term deal to provide cover during the 2023 Rugby World Cup.

=== Sharks ===
Swiel returned to the Sharks for the 2026 Currie Cup, playing in seven games scoring 38 points, including 2 tries.

=== Representative rugby ===
In addition to being included in the South Africa Schools side in 2011 against France where he scored 11 points, he was also included in a South Africa Under-20 training squad, but later ruled himself out of selection for the 2013 IRB Junior World Championship. Under IRB rules, playing for the S.A. Under-20 team would have made him ineligible to play for another international team, but as a British passport holder, Swiel wanted to keep his options open and did not yet want to commit his long-term international future to South Africa.
