= Ruan Steenkamp =

South African rugby union player

- Born: 2 February 1993 (age 33) Krugersdorp, South Africa
- Height: 1.83 m (6 ft 0 in)
- Weight: 105 kg (231 lb; 16 st 7 lb)
- School: Hoërskool Monument
- University: University of Pretoria (BEd)

Rugby union career
- Position: Flanker / Number eight
- Current team: Dubai Hurricanes
Youth career
- 2006–2011: Golden Lions
- 2012–2014: Blue Bulls
Amateur team(s)
Years	Team	Apps	(Points)
2015–2016	UP Tuks	10	(20)
Senior career
Years	Team	Apps	(Points)
2015–2019	Blue Bulls	21	(50)
2016–2019	Blue Bulls XV	16	(20)
2017–2020	Bulls	25	(0)
2019	Edinburgh	0	(0)
2021–2022	Griquas	14	(10)
- Correct as of 10 July 2022
International career
Years	Team	Apps	(Points)
2011	South Africa Schools	1	(0)
2013	South Africa Under-20	5	(10)
- Correct as of 11 April 2018

Ruan Steenkamp (born 2 February 1993) is a South African rugby union player for the Bulls in Super Rugby, the Griquas (rugby union) in the Currie Cup and the Blue Bulls XV in the Rugby Challenge. His regular position is flanker or number eight.

== Career ==
=== Golden Lions / South Africa Schools ===
Born and bred in Krugersdorp, Steenkamp was eligible to represent the Golden Lions at youth level. He earned several call-ups to play for them at youth tournaments, from as early as primary school level; in 2006, he represented them at the Under-13 Craven Week tournament held in Oudtshoorn. He also played at the Under-16 Grant Khomo Week in 2009 and represented them at the Under-18 Craven Week – the premier high school rugby union competition in South Africa – in both 2010 and 2011.

Steenkamp was also included in the 2011 South Africa Schools squad and he was named captain of the team that beat France 'A' 21–14 in Port Elizabeth.

Steenkamp then also made two appearances for the Golden Lions U19 side in the 2011 Under-19 Provincial Championship.

=== Blue Bulls / South Africa Under-20 ===
After high school, Steenkamp moved across the Jukskei River to join the Pretoria-based Blue Bulls prior to the 2012 season. He made eight appearances for the Blue Bulls U19s in the 2012 Under-19 Provincial Championship and also captained the side. He scored two tries during the round-robin stage of the season in matches against SWD U19 and Leopards U19 and doubled that tally by scoring a brace in their 46–35 victory over the Sharks U19 in the semi-final of the competition. He also captained the side in the final, but ended on the losing side as Western Province U19 ran out 22–19 winners.

In 2013, Steenkamp was named captain of the South Africa Under-20 squad for the 2013 IRB Junior World Championship. He started all five matches for a South African side that won the competition in 2012 and attempted to retain the title in the 2013 event held in France. They started off in fine fashion, beating the United States 97–0 in the opening match. Steenkamp scored a try midway through the first half as South Africa ran in 16 tries. South Africa secured a 31–24 victory over England and a 26–19 victory over the hosts France to finish top of Pool A and qualify for the semi-finals. However, a 17–18 defeat by Wales eliminated the defending champions from the competition. They recovered in the third-place play-off match to beat New Zealand 41–34, with Steenkamp getting his second try of the tournament shortly after half-time.

Steenkamp returned to domestic action after the tournament as he played for the Blue Bulls U21s in the 2013 Under-21 Provincial Championship. Despite still being at Under-20 level, he also occasionally captained the side, including their 70–19 victory over Border U21 where he started the match in an unfamiliar role of hooker. He made six appearances during the league stage of the competition and appeared as a replacement in both their 36–13 victory over Sharks U19 in the semi-final and the final, where the Blue Bulls lost 23–30 to Western Province U21.

Steenkamp again represented and captained the Blue Bulls U21 side in the 2014 Under-21 Provincial Championship. He started eleven of their twelve matches in the competition, scoring a try in eight of those matches, including tries in consecutive matches against Golden Lions U21, Leopards U21, Free State U21 and Sharks U21. The Blue Bulls finished in second position on the log to qualify for the play-offs and Steenkamp captained them in their 23–19 semi-final victory over the Golden Lions U21 and the final, where Steenkamp scored one of two late tries as the Blue Bulls won the final 20–10 to clinch the Under-21 championship. Steenkamp's nine tries during the season was the most by a Blue Bulls player during their victorious campaign.

Steenkamp started the 2015 season by representing university side UP Tuks in the 2015 Varsity Cup competition. He appeared in their first two fixtures of the season and scored two tries in their 39–24 victory over defending champions UCT Ikey Tigers. He suffered a posterior cruciate ligament injury that ruled him out for several months, but returned for the Blue Bulls during the 2015 Currie Cup Premier Division season. He made his domestic first class debut on 25 September 2015, when he played off the bench in their 17–13 victory over the Sharks in Durban. He made an incident-filled home debut a week later, coming on as a replacement early in the second half, scoring his first senior try fifteen minutes after coming on, but also spending the final minutes of the match in the sin-bin following a 74th-minute yellow card. He also played off the bench in their final regular season match in a 25–24 win over the Pumas to help them finish second on the log and clinch a home semi-final for the first time since 2008.
