= Harlon Klaasen =

South African rugby union player

- Full name: Harlon Jason Klaasen
- Born: 13 August 1993 (age 33) Malmesbury, South Africa
- Height: 1.86 m (6 ft 1 in)
- Weight: 83 kg (183 lb; 13 st 1 lb)
- School: Labori High School, Paarl
- University: Northlink College, Bellville

Rugby union career
- Position: Utility back
- Current team: Griquas
Youth career
- 2012–2014: Boland Cavaliers
Senior career
Years	Team	Apps	(Points)
2014–2015	Boland Cavaliers	10	(20)
2017	Western Province	5	(0)
2017	Eastern Province Kings	2	(20)
2017–2019	Southern Kings	24	(45)
2019–2020	Dijon	14	(35)
2020–2021	Griquas	6	(0)
- Correct as of 27 December 2021

Harlon Jason Klaasen (born 13 August 1993) is a South African rugby union player who last played for the Southern Kings in the Pro14. He is a utility back that can play as a centre, wing or fullback.

== Boland Cavaliers ==
Klaasen was born in Malmesbury. and represented local provincial side Boland Cavaliers at youth level, starting at Under-19 level in the 2012 Under-19 Provincial Championship. He made his first class debut in the 2014 Vodacom Cup, starting as fullback in their penultimate match against the Eastern Province Kings, further marking the occasion by scoring a try in a 21–28 defeat. He also scored a try in his only appearance in the 2014 Currie Cup qualification series, in a 37–12 victory over the Border Bulldogs, before reverting to Under-21 level in the 2014 Under-21 Provincial Championship, where he finished as the competition's top try scorer, with 15 tries in just eight matches, scoring four tries in two different matches, against Griquas U21 and Limpopo Blue Bulls U21.

He scored two tries in seven appearances for Boland in the 2015 Vodacom Cup, but didn't feature in the Currie Cup competition.

== Hamiltons and Western Province ==
Klaasen then played amateur club rugby for Hamiltons in Western Province's Super League A competition, where he finished as the 2016 competition's top scorer with 14 tries, earning a contract with Western Province for their 2017 Rugby Challenge squad. He made five appearances, four of them off the bench, for the team that went on to win the competition, beating Griquas in the final.

== Eastern Province Kings and Southern Kings ==
In late 2017, Klaasen moved to Port Elizabeth to join the Eastern Province Kings for their 2017 Currie Cup First Division campaign. He made just two starts — a 39–71 defeat to the Griffons in Welkom and a 22–66 defeat to the SWD Eagles in George — but scored two tries in each of those matches to finish as the Kings second-highest try scorer.

He was called into the Southern Kings squad for their 2017–18 Pro14 campaign and was named on the bench for their match against Welsh side Scarlets, coming off the bench to score a try and secure a losing bonus point for the Southern Kings in the 30–34 defeat. He made his first start a week later, scoring another try in a defeat to Scottish side Edinburgh. He made a total of nine appearances throughout the season, scoring further tries against Ulster and the Cheetahs to finish with a haul of five tries for the Kings, only bettered by winger Yaw Penxe.
