= Ruan van Rensburg =

South African rugby union player

- Full name: Ruan van Rensburg
- Born: 31 May 1993 (age 33) Pretoria, South Africa
- Height: 1.77 m (5 ft 9 1/2 in)
- Weight: 85 kg (13 st 5 lb; 187 lb)
- School: Hoërskool Waterkloof, Pretoria

Rugby union career
- Position: Scrum-half
Youth career
- 2012–2014: Golden Lions
Amateur team(s)
Years	Team	Apps	(Points)
2015	Wits	8	(20)
2021-2023	Rugby Club Amiénois	30	(238)
Senior career
Years	Team	Apps	(Points)
2014–2015	Golden Lions	2	(0)
2015	→ Leopards XV	2	(0)
2015	Free State Cheetahs	2	(0)
2016–2018	Free State XV	18	(20)
2017	Cheetahs	5	(0)
2018	Eastern Province Elephants	2	(5)
2018–2019	Southern Kings	1	(0)
2021	SWD Eagles	4	(5)
- Correct as of 30 April 2023

Ruan van Rensburg (born 31 May 1993 in Pretoria, South Africa) is a South African rugby union player who plays for the SWD Eagles in South Africa's Provincial Competition the Currie Cup. (Note: The SARU website erroneously included Ruan Janse van Rensburg, a flanker that represented the Griffons at the 2011 Craven Week, instead of Ruan van Rensburg in some squads. Some match reports, etc., might refer to this incorrectly-linked player.) His regular position is scrum-half.

== Career ==
=== Golden Lions ===
Van Rensburg attended Hoërskool Waterkloof in Pretoria, where he played first team rugby in 2010 and 2011. After school, he moved to Johannesburg to join the Golden Lions Academy, where he made a single appearance for the Golden Lions U19s during the 2012 Under-19 Provincial Championship.

He appeared in nine matches for the Golden Lions U21s during the 2013 Under-21 Provincial Championship, starting eight of those and scoring a try in their 45–16 victory over Border U21. The Golden Lions finished in fourth spot on the log to qualify for the semi-finals, where they lost 41–44 after extra time to eventual champions Western Province U21.

At the start of 2014, Van Rensburg was included in the Golden Lions squad for the 2014 Vodacom Cup competition. He was named on the bench for their second match of the season against near-neighbours the Falcons, but failed to make an appearance. He made his first team debut four weeks later; he was once again named on the bench for their match against the Limpopo Blue Bulls in Polokwane and came on just after half-time to replace Ricky Schroeder, eventually helping his side to a 110–0 victory in the match. He also played off the bench in their next match against the Pumas in Alberton, this time being on the wrong end of a 27–48 defeat. The Golden Lions finished fourth to qualify for the play-offs and made it all the way to the final of the competition, where they lost 6–30 to Griquas.

He was a key player for the Golden Lions U21s in the 2014 Under-21 Provincial Championship, starting twelve of their thirteen matches. He shared the kicking duties with Hanco Deale and Brandan Hewitt for the Golden Lions, and ended the second with the second-highest personal points contribution from a Lions player behind Deale; he scored 59 points, which consisted of 25 conversions and 3 penalties. His top points haul in a single match came in their 52–12 victory over Free State U21, kicking six conversions and a penalty.

=== Wits & Leopards ===
Van Rensburg was retained by the Golden Lions for 2015, but was loaned to Potchefstroom-based side the Leopards for the 2015 season.

He started the season representing Wits in the 2015 Varsity Shield competition. He scored a try in their 39–24 win over the UFH Blues in Alice and scored fifteen points with the boot during the competition as Wits made it to the final, where they lost 24–29 to UKZN Impi.

He made two appearances for the Leopards during the 2015 Vodacom Cup competition, playing off the bench in their matches against the Griffons and Namibian side Welwitschias.

=== Free State Cheetahs ===
He moved to Bloemfontein prior to the 2015 Currie Cup Premier Division and was named on the bench for their third match of the competition against Griquas.
