= EW Viljoen =

South African rugby union player

- Born: 9 May 1995 (age 31) Bloemfontein, South Africa
- Height: 1.92 m (6 ft 3 1/2 in)
- Weight: 92 kg (14 st 7 lb; 203 lb)
- School: Grey College, Bloemfontein

Rugby union career
- Position: Fullback / Winger / Centre
Youth career
- 2008–2013: Free State Cheetahs
- 2014–2016: Western Province
Senior career
Years	Team	Apps	(Points)
2014–2019	Western Province	37	(65)
2017–2019	Stormers	29	(35)
2019–2020	Leicester Tigers	4	(0)
2020–2022	Lions	15	(19)
2020–2022	Golden Lions	9	(5)
- Correct as of 16 September 2022
International career
Years	Team	Apps	(Points)
2013	South Africa Schools	2	(0)
2015	South Africa Under-20	3	(0)
- Correct as of 18 April 2018

EW Viljoen (born 9 May 1995 in Bloemfontein, South Africa) is a South African rugby union player playing for the Johannesburg based Lions. He previously played for the Stormers in Super Rugby and Western Province in the Currie Cup and in the Rugby Challenge, while also representing the Leicester Tigers. It was announced on the 14th of July 2020 that Viljoen would be joining the Lions. He is a utility back that can play as a fullback, winger or centre.

== Career ==
=== Youth ===
Viljoen was noticed at primary school level, when he was selected in the Free State squad for the Under-13 Craven Week tournament in 2008. He then went to Grey College in Bloemfontein, where he was called up to a number of youth tournaments. He played at the Under-16 Grant Khomo Week in 2011, where he scored 18 points in two matches against Western Province and the Falcons.

In 2012, he was included in the Free State's Under-18 Craven Week squad, scoring a try against KwaZulu-Natal and he played in the competition again in 2013, this time contributing a brace in their match against the Pumas.

This led to Viljoen's inclusion in the South African Schools side for the 2013 international series, where he started two matches to help the South African side to victories over England and France.

At the end of 2013, he moved to Cape Town to join Western Province. He was one of the Western Province Rugby Institute players that were invited to form part of the Stormers wider training group prior to the 2014 Super Rugby season. A knee injury ruled him out for part of the season, but he returned to action for the Western Province U21 side during the 2014 Under-21 Provincial Championship, scoring five tries in five appearances, including a brace against the Leopards U21.

=== Western Province ===
He was included in the senior squad for the first time for the final match of the round-robin stage of the 2014 Currie Cup Premier Division, being named in the starting line-up for their match against the Sharks.

=== Leicester Tigers ===
On 2 July 2019, English Premiership Rugby side Leicester Tigers announced the signing of Viljoen ahead of the 2019–20 season.

=== Lions/Golden Lions ===
On 14 July 2020, Vijoen returns to South Africa to sign for Lions back into the Super Rugby competition. He will also play for Golden Lions in the Currie Cup and Vodacom Cup competitions.

=== South Africa Under-20 ===
In March 2015, Viljoen was named in an extended South Africa Under-20 training group as part of their preparation for the 2015 World Rugby Under 20 Championship. He didn't feature in a friendly match against a Varsity Cup Dream Team or their two-match tour of Argentina, but was included in the final squad for the 2015 World Rugby Under 20 Championship.

He wasn't named in the squad for their 33–5 win against hosts Italy in the first of their three matches in Pool B of the competition and was an unused replacement in their next match, a 40–8 win against Samoa. He started their final match, a 46–13 win over Australia to help South Africa finish top of Pool B to qualify for the semi-finals with the best record pool stage of all the teams in the competition. Viljoen started their semi-final match against England, but could not prevent them losing 20–28 to be eliminated from the competition by England for the second year in succession and also started their third-place play-off match against France, helping South Africa to a 31–18 win to secure third place in the competition.

== Cricket ==
Viljoen was also a cricketer at school and was called up to various Free State youth cricket teams.
