= Michael Kumbirai =

South African rugby union player

- Full name: Michael Masimba Tingini Kumbirai
- Born: 9 May 1996 (age 30) Pretoria, South Africa
- Height: 1.88 m (6 ft 2 in)
- Weight: 123 kg (271 lb; 19 st 5 lb)
- School: St. Alban's College
- University: University of Cape Town

Rugby union career
- Position: Prop
- Current team: Soyaux Angoulême
Youth career
- 2012–2014: Blue Bulls
- 2015–2017: Western Province
Senior career
Years	Team	Apps	(Points)
2017–2019	Western Province	36	(0)
2019	Stormers	1	(0)
2020–2021	Sharks	2	(0)
2020–2021	Sharks (Currie Cup)	5	(0)
2021–	Soyaux Angoulême		
- Correct as of 14 September 2021

Michael Masimba Tingini Kumbirai (born 9 May 1996) is a South African rugby union player for the Stormers in Super Rugby and Western Province in the Currie Cup and the Rugby Challenge. His regular position is tighthead prop.
