= Joshua Stander =

South African rugby union player (born 1994)

- Full name: Joshua Trevor Stander
- Born: 1 January 1994 (age 32) Cradock, South Africa
- Height: 1.83 m (6 ft 0 in)
- Weight: 90 kg (14 st 2 lb; 198 lb)
- School: Queen's College, Queenstown
- University: University of Pretoria

Rugby union career
- Position: Fly-half
Youth career
- 2007–2011: Border Bulldogs
- 2013–2015: Blue Bulls
Amateur team(s)
Years	Team	Apps	(Points)
2015–2017	UP Tuks	24	(169)
Senior career
Years	Team	Apps	(Points)
2014–2017	Blue Bulls	19	(56)
2016–2017	Blue Bulls XV	18	(104)
2018–2019	Stormers	13	(71)
2018–2019	Western Province	19	(111)
2021–2022	Suntory Sungoliath	3	(14)
2022–2024	Kamaishi Seawaves	9	(66)
- Correct as of 21 February 2021

Joshua Trevor Stander (born 1 January 1994) is a South African professional rugby union player for the Stormers in Super Rugby and Western Province in the Currie Cup and in the Rugby Challenge. His regular position is fly-half.

== Career ==
=== Youth ===
Stander went to school in Queenstown, where he earned a few call-ups to the youth sides of the Border Bulldogs. At primary school level, he was selected for the Border side that played at the 2007 Under-13 Craven Week competition. At high school level, he played for Queen's College and represented Border at the Under-16 Grant Khomo Week in 2010 and the Under-18 Craven Week in 2011. He was also eligible to play at the 2012 Craven Week, but was not picked as he had agreed to join the Pretoria-based Blue Bulls and fell foul of a newly-adopted Border Rugby Football Union policy of not picking players for their Craven Week squad that already signed contracts with other unions.

Stander made just one appearance for the Blue Bulls U19 side in the 2013 Under-19 Provincial Championship, playing off the bench and slotting a conversion in a 56-7 win against former side Border U19 in East London.

Stander also played for the Blue Bulls U21 side in the 2014 Under-21 Provincial Championship. His game against the Border U21 turned out to be a memorable one as he scored two tries and kicked twelve conversions for a personal points haul of 34 points as the Blue Bulls recorded a 143–0 win.

=== Blue Bulls ===
His first class career started in the 2014 Vodacom Cup. After being an unused substitute in their matches against Griquas and the Pumas, he made his debut for the Blue Bulls in their match against the Leopards XV in Leeudoringstad, kicking two conversions in the match as they secured a 30–26 victory. Further appearances followed in their matches against the Falcons and the Griffons before Stander scored his first career try against the Limpopo Blue Bulls, also slotting five conversions in the match despite only coming off the bench in the second half.

Stander was included in the Blue Bulls' Currie Cup side for the 2014 Currie Cup Premier Division and was named on the bench for their Round Three clash against the Eastern Province Kings in Pretoria. He did not make an appearance in that match, but was promoted to the starting line-up the following week for their match against Western Province after Tony Jantjies and Jacques-Louis Potgieter were ruled out due to injury and illness.
