= Charles H. Blosser =

American pilot, airport owner and mayor (1895-1989)

Mayor of Concordia, Kansas
- In office 1931–1933

Personal details
- Born: September 7, 1895
- Died: December 30, 1989 (aged 94)
- Spouse: Isabell A. Collins
- Occupation: Pilot; politician
- Awards: Kansas Governor's Aviation Honors Award (1988); Kansas Aviation Hall of Fame (1990)

Charles H. Blosser (September 7, 1895 – December 30, 1989) was the namesake of Blosser Municipal Airport in Concordia, Kansas. A longtime airplane enthusiast and pilot, Blosser owned and ran the airport privately until transferring it to the city of Concordia.

Blosser moved to Norway, Kansas, from Saline County, Missouri. On October 20, 1921, he was married to Isabell A. Collins at Belleville.

== Aviation accomplishments ==
In 1930, Blosser laid the first dirt airstrip on his farm on what would become Blosser Municipal Airport. He later donated the land to the city for airport use.

In 1935, Blosser was honored by the Concordia Chamber of Commerce for his "heroic services during the Republican River flood" in June of that year. Blosser would fly over flooded areas, acted as a spotter for rescue boats, dropped food to stranded individuals and acted as a shuttle service by flying people back and forth across the flooded river. Blosser is credited with rescuing twenty-eight people from the flood.

In 1988, he was awarded the Kansas Governor's Aviation Honors Award and was inducted into the Kansas Aviation Hall of Fame in 1990. At one time, he was the oldest living licensed pilot in the United States.

Blosser was instrumental in making Kansas a member of the National Bureau of Reclamation and in working with the late Senator Frank Carlson and the United States Bureau of Reclamation in getting flood control along the Republican River.

== Local politics ==
Blosser was elected mayor of Concordia and served a term from 1931 to 1933.
