= Johnny Kôtze =

South African rugby union player

- Full name: John-Ben Kôtze
- Born: 24 January 1993 (age 33) Carletonville, South Africa
- Height: 1.85 m (6 ft 1 in)
- Weight: 95 kg (14 st 13 lb; 209 lb)
- School: Bishops College, Cape Town

Rugby union career
- Position: Centre / Winger
Youth career
- 2012–2014: Western Province
Amateur team(s)
Years	Team	Apps	(Points)
2013–2014	Maties	4	(10)
Senior career
Years	Team	Apps	(Points)
2014–2016	Western Province	27	(25)
2015–2016	Stormers	19	(5)
2017–2018	Blue Bulls XV	4	(0)
2017–2019	Blue Bulls	19	(15)
2018–2020	Bulls	35	(40)
2018–2019	→ Ospreys	4	(10)
2021–2025	Shimizu Blue Sharks	36	(55)
- Correct as of 22 February 2021
International career
Years	Team	Apps	(Points)
2011	South Africa Schools Academy		
- Correct as of 13 April 2018

John-Ben Kôtze (born 24 January 1993) is a South African professional rugby union player for the Bulls in Super Rugby and the Blue Bulls in the Currie Cup. He primarily plays at centre, though he is equally capable of performing on the wing.

== Career ==
=== School ===
Kôtze attended Bishops College in Cape Town and played for their first XV in 2010 and 2011, where he played alongside Dillyn Leyds in 2010 and Tim Swiel in both 2010 and 2011.

=== 2012–13 ===
Kôtze's first provincial involvement came in 2012, when he was included in the Western Province U19 squad that participated in the 2012 Under-19 Provincial Championship. He also made a single appearance for the Western Province U21s in the same season. He made ten appearances for Western Province U21 in the 2013 Under-21 Provincial Championship, scoring a brace of tries in his first start at this level in their final match of the regular season against the Sharks U21. They topped the log to qualify for the semi-finals and Kôtze started both the semi-final win against the Golden Lions U21 and the final against the Blue Bulls, where he helped his side to a 30–23 victory over the Blue Bulls U21.

=== 2014–2015 ===
The following year, he was a member of the Maties side that played in the 2014 Varsity Cup. He played in the first four of Maties' matches in this competition, scoring two tries. He then moved to the Western Province squad that participated in the 2014 Vodacom Cup, where he made his first class debut by starting their 16–8 victory in the opening round of the competition. Kôtze also scored his first career try in Round Five of the competition, a 65–29 victory over Kenyan invitational side Simba XV, eventually making a total of 6 starts.

Kôtze was a key figure for the Western Province U21 side that participated in the 2014 Under-21 Provincial Championship, starting eleven of their fourteen matches during the competition, including their semi-final victory over Free State U21 – during which he scored one of seven tries during the season to help Western Province to a 41–17 victory – and the final, where they lost 10–20 to the Blue Bulls U21s.

In 2015, Kôtze was named in the wider training group of Super Rugby side the Stormers. He was included in their final squad for the season and was included in the starting line-up for their season-opening match against the Bulls. He played the entire 80 minutes of the match as the Stormers started their season in fine form by running out 29–17 winners in the match in Pretoria.
