= Blosser, Missouri =

Extinct hamlet in Missouri, U.S.

Coordinates: 39.1944665°N 93.2829845°W

Blosser is a ghost town in Saline County, Missouri, United States. It is named after Erskin John Blosser.

A post office called Blosser was established in 1891, and remained in operation until 1911. The community has the name of E. J. Blosser, the original owner of the town site.
