= Kwenzo Blose =

South African rugby union player

- Full name: Kwenzokuhle Ndumiso Blose
- Born: 12 May 1997 (age 29) Paulpietersburg, South Africa
- Height: 1.87 m (6 ft 1 1/2 in)
- Weight: 109 kg (240 lb)
- School: Glenwood High School. Durban
- University: University of the Free State

Rugby union career
- Position: Prop
- Current team: Stormers / Western Province
Senior career
Years	Team	Apps	(Points)
2018–2024	Western Province	28	(5)
2020–2024	Stormers	6	(0)
2024–	Exeter Chiefs	0	(0)
- Correct as of 23 July 2022
International career
Years	Team	Apps	(Points)
2016	South Africa U20s	7	(0)
- Correct as of 14 July 2019

Kwenzokuhle Ndumiso Blose (born 12 May 1997) is a South African rugby union player for the Exeter Chiefs in the Premiership Rugby competition. His regular position is prop.

Blose made his Currie Cup debut for Western Province in July 2019, coming on as a replacement prop in their opening match of the 2019 season against the Blue Bulls.

On 20 August 2024, Blose would move to England as he signs for Exeter Chiefs in the Gallagher Premiership from the 2024-25 season.
