= Blosser Municipal Airport =

Airport in Cloud County, Kansas, U.S.

Coordinates: 39°32′57″N 097°39′08″W

- IATA: CNK; ICAO: KCNK; FAA LID: CNK

Summary
- Airport type: Public
- Owner: City of Concordia
- Serves: Concordia, Kansas
- Elevation AMSL: 1,486 ft (453 m)
- Interactive map of Blosser Municipal Airport

Runways
Direction	Length		Surface
Direction	ft	m	Surface
17/35	3,600	1,097	Asphalt
12/30	2,205	672	Turf
3/21	1,665	507	Turf

Statistics (2007)
- Aircraft operations: 14,550
- Based aircraft: 9
- Source: Federal Aviation Administration

Blosser Municipal Airport (IATA: CNK, ICAO: KCNK, FAA LID: CNK) is two miles south of Concordia, in Cloud County, Kansas, United States. The airport was named after Charles H. Blosser, a longtime Concordia resident, aviation enthusiast, and former city mayor. It is on land originally owned by the Blosser family.

== Facilities ==
The airport covers 209 acres (85 ha); its one asphalt runway (17/35) is 3,600 ft × 60 ft (1,097 m × 18 m). It has two turf runways: 12/30 is 2,205 ft × 265 ft (672 m × 81 m) and 3/21 is 1,665 ft × 255 ft (507 m × 78 m).

In the year ending July 24, 2007 the airport had 14,550 aircraft operations, average 39 per day: 97% general aviation and 3% military. Nine aircraft were then based at the airport: eight single-engine and one ultralight.

== History ==
In 1930, Charlie Blosser laid the first dirt airstrip on his farm. He later donated the land to the city for airport use.

== Gallery ==
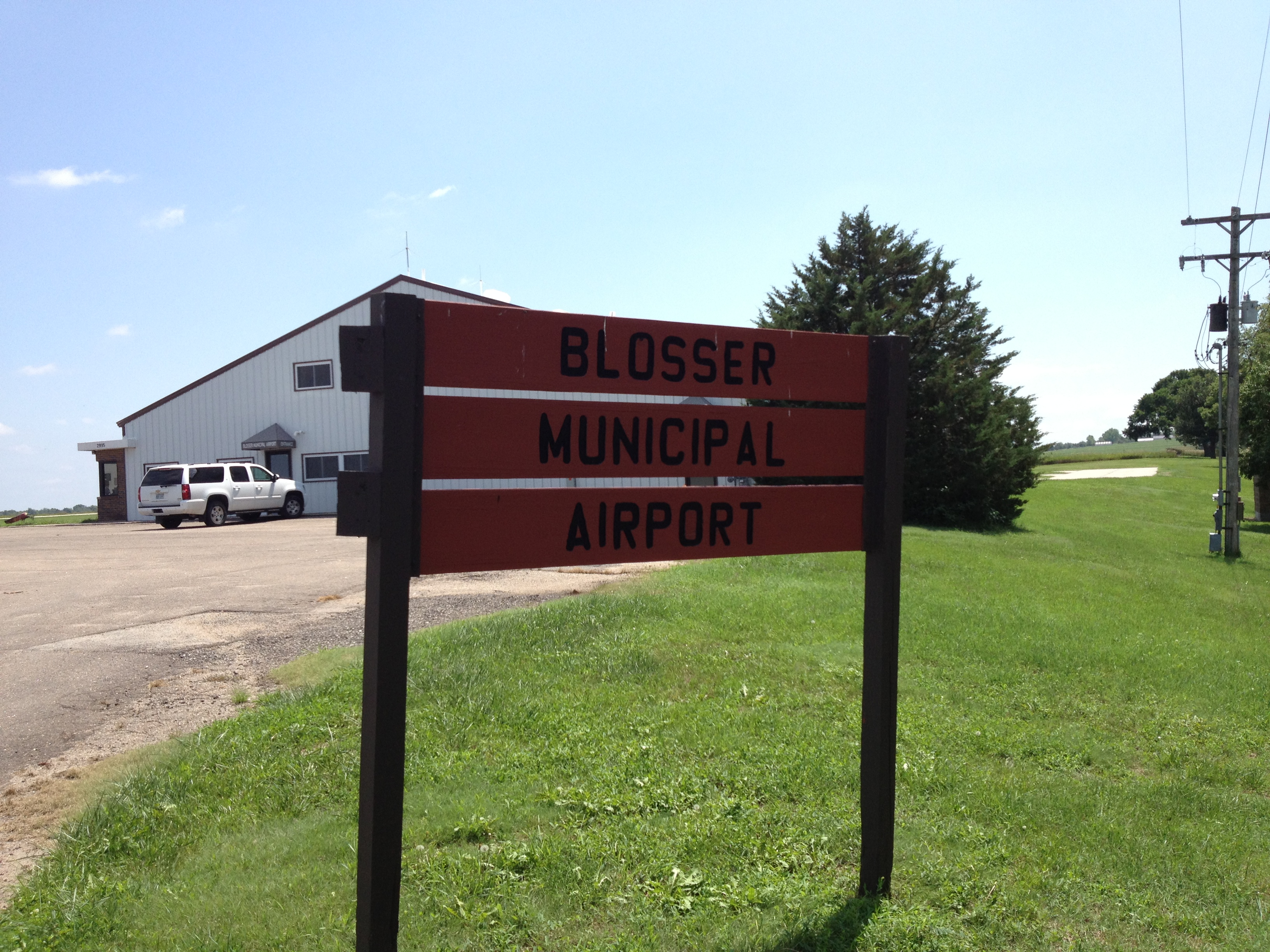
Airport welcome sign

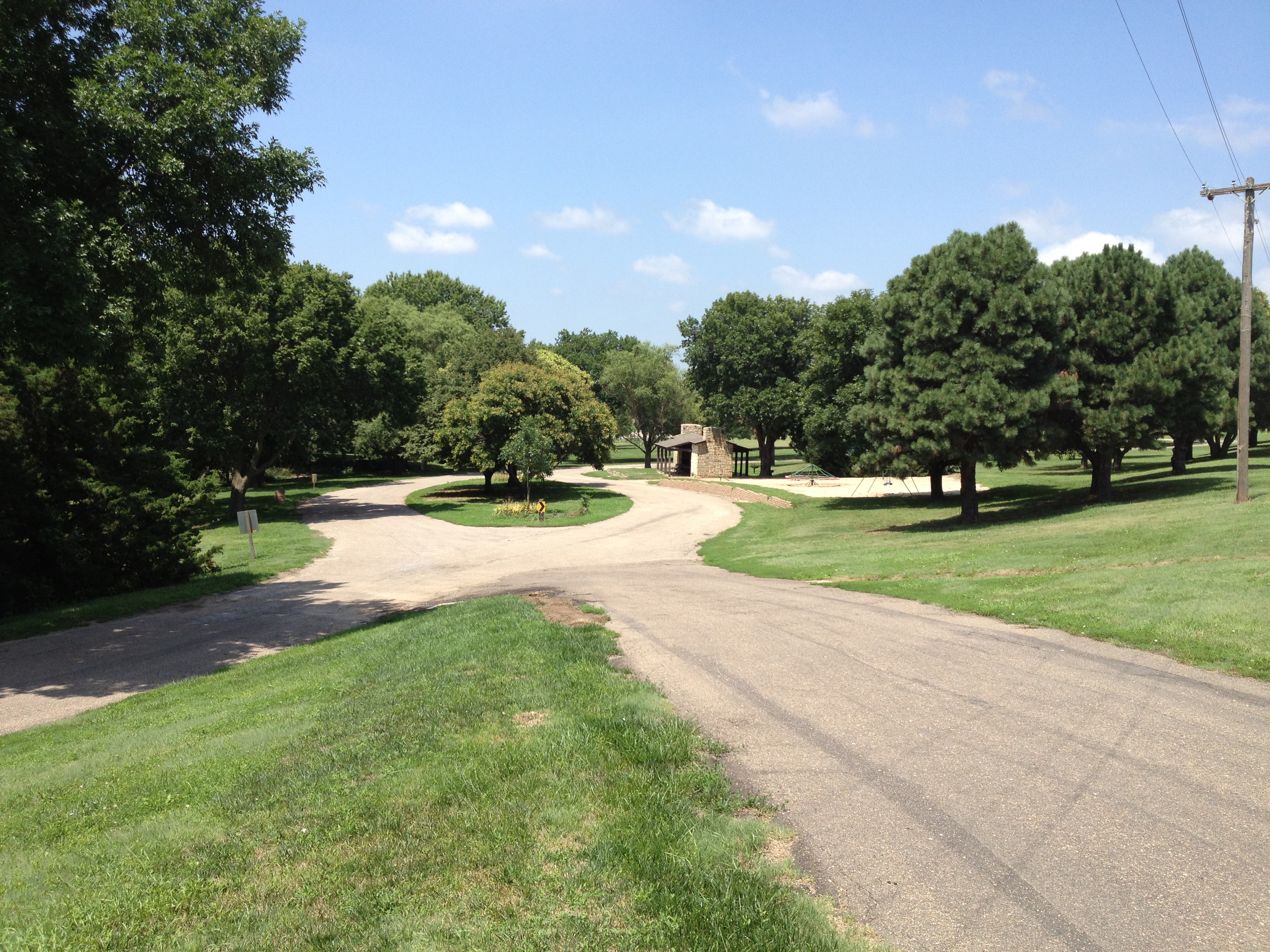
View of Airport Park

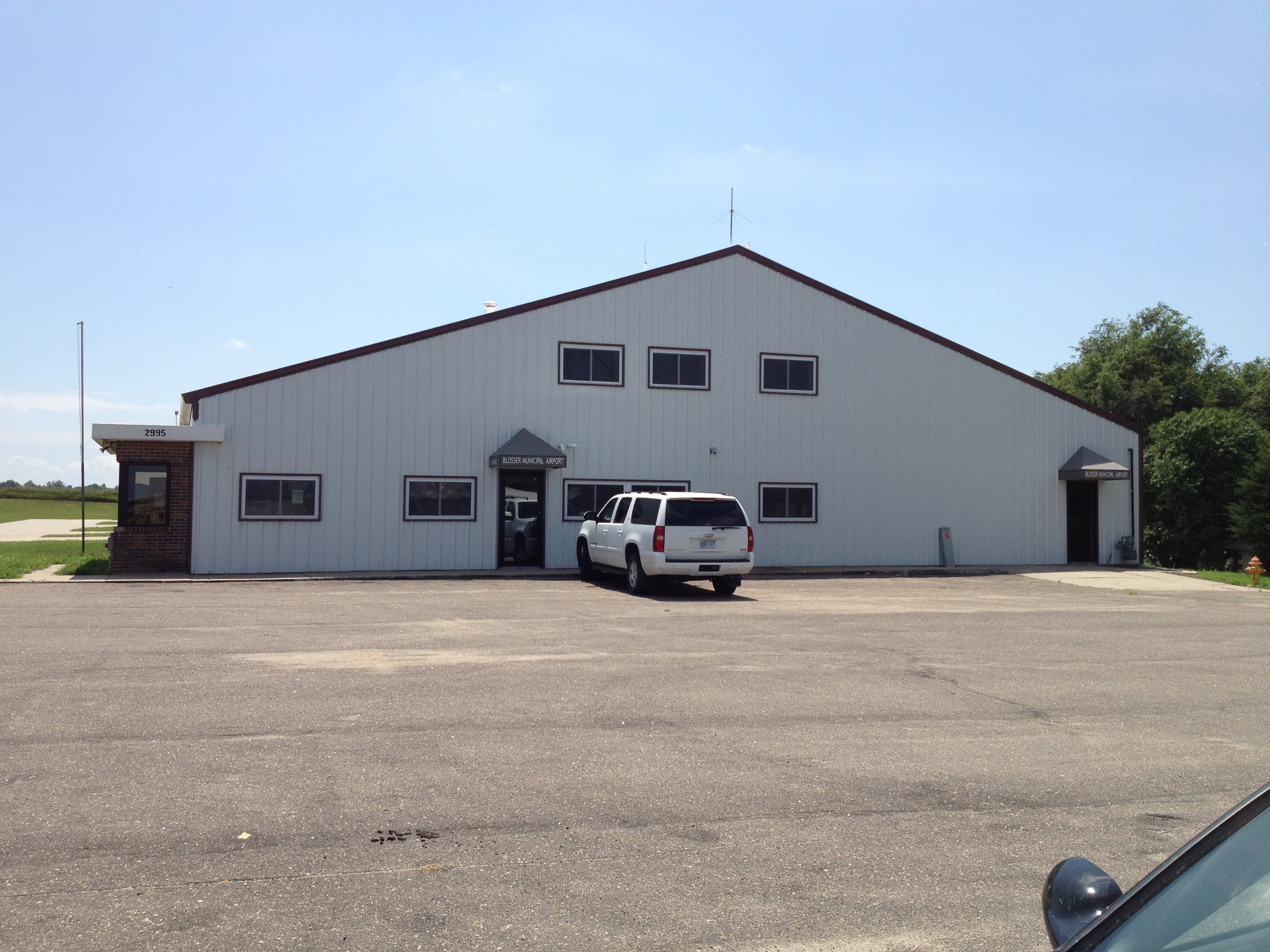
Main building

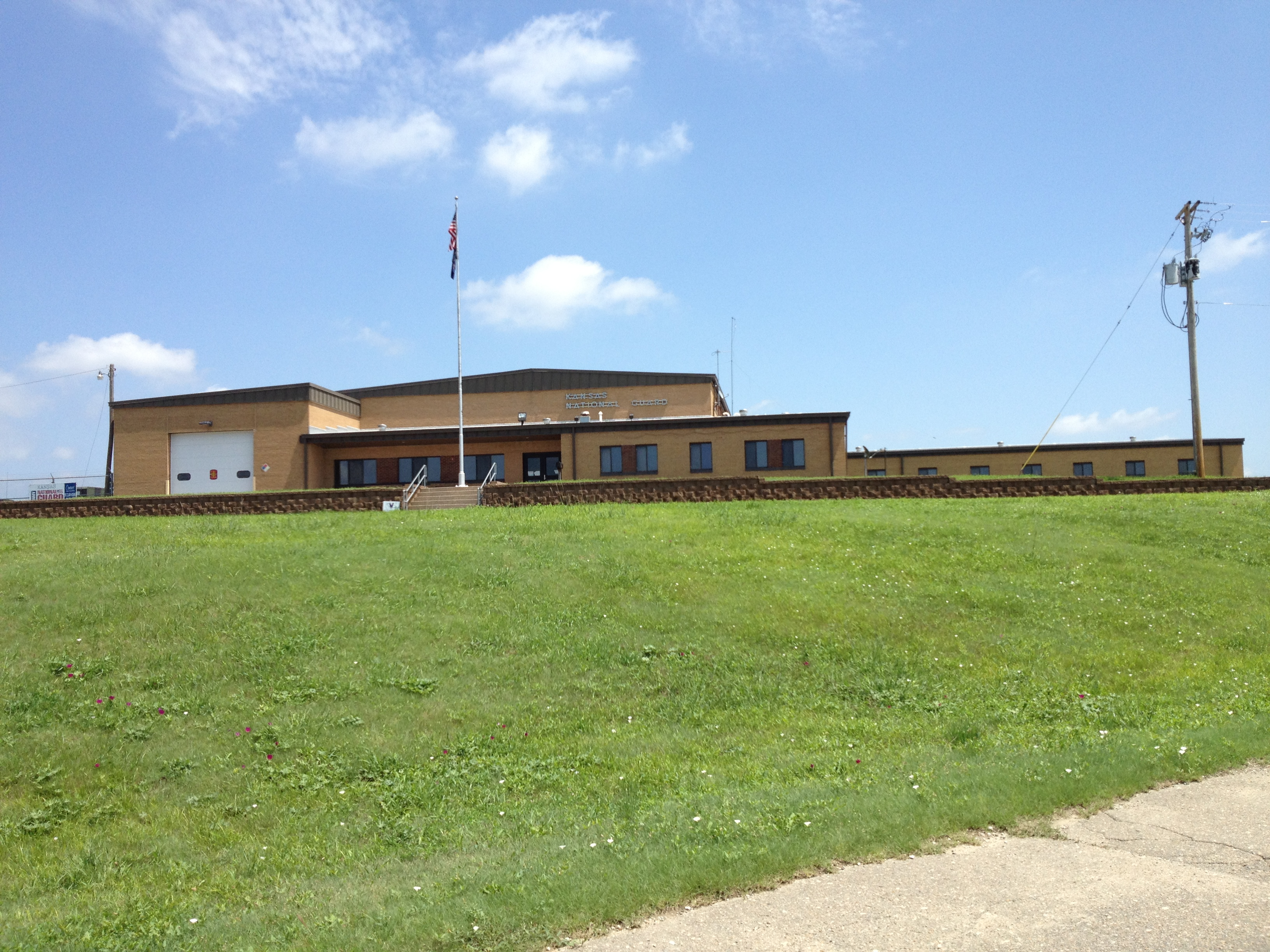
The Kansas Army National Guard Armory is in the airport complex.

Video panorama of airport from ground level

== See also ==
- List of airports in Kansas
