= 2017–18 Cheetahs season =

Cheetahs
- 2017–18 season
- Head coach: Rory Duncan
- Captain: Francois Venter
- Stadium: Free State Stadium
- Conference A: 3rd
- Record: Won 12, Lost 10
- Top try scorer: All: Makazole Mapimpi (10)
- Top points scorer: All: Fred Zeilinga (86)
Home colours	Away colours

In the 2017–18 rugby union season, the Cheetahs participated in the Pro14 competition, their inaugural appearance in the competition after losing their Super Rugby status after the 2017 season.

== Personnel ==
=== Coaches and management ===
The Cheetahs coaching and management staff for the 2017–18 Pro14 season were:

2017–18 Cheetahs coaches and management
Position	Name
Director of Rugby	Franco Smith
Head coach	Rory Duncan
Forwards coach	Corniel van Zyl
Backline coach	Dave Williams
Defence coach	Charl Strydom
Team manager	Sakkie Wessels
Medical doctor	Dr Rudi de Wet
Physiotherapist	JP du Toit
Biokineticist	Quintin Kruger

=== Squad ===
The Cheetahs' squad for the 2017–18 Pro14 is:

2017–18 Cheetahs squad
Player	Position/s	Date of birth (age)	Pro14		Cheetahs	
Player	Position/s	Date of birth (age)	Apps	Pts	Apps	Pts
(South Africa) Cecil Afrika	Fullback	3 March 1988 (aged 29)	–	–	–	–
(South Africa) Craig Barry	Fullback	30 April 1992 (aged 25)	–	–	–	–
(South Africa) Justin Basson	Lock	10 February 1994 (aged 23)	–	–	–	–
(South Africa) Rayno Benjamin	Centre	3 August 1983 (aged 34)	–	–	–	–
(South Africa) Rynier Bernardo	Lock	27 August 1991 (aged 26)	25	0	–	–
(South Africa) Clayton Blommetjies	Fullback	30 August 1990 (aged 27)	–	–	–	–
(South Africa) Tom Botha	Prop	31 August 1990 (aged 27)	–	–	–	–
(South Africa) Uzair Cassiem	Loose forward	17 March 1990 (aged 27)	–	–	–	–
(South Africa) AJ Coertzen	Fullback	16 October 1990 (aged 26)	–	–	–	–
(Namibia) Aranos Coetzee	Prop	14 March 1988 (aged 29)	–	–	–	–
(South Africa) Luan de Bruin	Prop	13 February 1993 (aged 24)	–	–	–	–
(South Africa) Erich de Jager	Prop	29 February 1996 (aged 21)	–	–	–	–
(South Africa) Chris Dry	Loose forward	13 February 1988 (aged 29)	–	–	–	–
(South Africa) Jacques du Toit	Hooker	19 November 1993 (aged 23)	–	–	–	–
(South Africa) Joseph Dweba	Hooker	25 October 1995 (aged 21)	–	–	–	–
(South Africa) Ryno Eksteen	Fly-half	3 October 1994 (aged 22)	–	–	–	–
(South Africa) Johan Goosen	Fly-half	27 July 1992 (aged 25)	–	–	–	–
(South Africa) Lloyd Greeff	Wing	3 January 1994 (aged 23)	13	10	–	–
(South Africa) Elandré Huggett	Hooker	5 October 1991 (aged 25)	–	–	–	–
(South Africa) Reniel Hugo	Lock	19 July 1990 (aged 27)	–	–	–	–
(South Africa) Malcolm Jaer	Fullback	29 June 1995 (aged 22)	–	–	–	–
(South Africa) Günther Janse van Vuuren	Prop	24 August 1995 (aged 22)	–	–	–	–
(South Africa) Niell Jordaan	Loose forward	13 January 1992 (aged 25)	–	–	–	–
(South Africa) Armandt Koster	Lock	20 January 1990 (aged 27)	–	–	–	–
(South Africa) Johan Kotze	Prop	13 January 1995 (aged 22)	–	–	–	–
(South Africa) Tertius Kruger	Centre	9 August 1993 (aged 24)	–	–	–	–
(South Africa) Nico Lee	Centre	13 March 1994 (aged 23)	–	–	–	–
(South Africa) Hilton Lobberts	Lock	11 June 1986 (aged 31)	–	–	–	–
(South Africa) Daniel Maartens	Flanker	4 May 1995 (aged 22)	–	–	–	–
(South Africa) Makazole Mapimpi	Wing	26 July 1990 (aged 27)	–	–	–	–
(South Africa) Charles Marais	Prop	29 August 1988 (aged 29)	–	–	–	–
(South Africa) Niel Marais	Fly-half	21 January 1992 (aged 25)	–	–	–	–
(South Africa) Rabz Maxwane	Wing	14 August 1995 (aged 22)	–	–	–	–
(South Africa) Tian Meyer	Scrum-half	20 September 1988 (aged 28)	–	–	–	–
(South Africa) Ali Mgijima	Centre	12 February 1995 (aged 22)	–	–	–	–
(South Africa) Zee Mkhabela	Scrum-half	15 October 1994 (aged 22)	–	–	–	–
(South Africa) Oupa Mohojé	Loose forward	3 August 1990 (aged 27)	–	–	–	–
(South Africa) Ox Nché	Prop	23 July 1995 (aged 22)	–	–	–	–
(South Africa) Luther Obi	Wing	29 April 1993 (aged 24)	–	–	–	–
(South Africa) Gerhard Olivier	Loose forward	17 February 1993 (aged 24)	–	–	–	–
(South Africa) Sergeal Petersen	Wing	1 August 1994 (aged 23)	–	–	–	–
(South Africa) Robbie Petzer	Fly-half	13 February 1996 (aged 21)	–	–	–	–
(South Africa) Junior Pokomela	Loose forward	10 December 1996 (aged 20)	–	–	–	–
(South Africa) Raymond Rhule	Wing	6 November 1992 (aged 24)	–	–	–	–
(South Africa) Paul Schoeman	Loose forward	19 December 1992 (aged 24)	–	–	–	–
(South Africa) William Small-Smith	Centre	31 March 1992 (aged 25)	–	–	–	–
(South Africa) JP Smith	Scrum-half	30 March 1994 (aged 23)	–	–	–	–
(South Africa) Rosko Specman	Wing	28 April 1989 (aged 28)	–	–	–	–
(South Africa) Ernst Stapelberg	Fly-half	6 February 1995 (aged 22)	–	–	–	–
(South Africa) Clinton Swart	Centre	6 September 1992 (aged 24)	–	–	–	–
(Namibia) Torsten van Jaarsveld	Hooker	30 June 1987 (aged 30)	–	–	–	–
(South Africa) Ruan van Rensburg	Scrum-half	31 May 1993 (aged 24)	–	–	–	–
(South Africa) Henco Venter	Loose forward	27 March 1992 (aged 25)	–	–	–	–
(South Africa) Reinach Venter	Hooker	3 January 1995 (aged 22)	–	–	–	–
(South Africa) Shaun Venter	Scrum-half	16 March 1987 (aged 30)	–	–	–	–
(South Africa) Francois Venter	Centre	19 April 1991 (aged 26)	–	–	–	–
(South Africa) Ntokozo Vidima	Lock	13 May 1995 (aged 22)	–	–	–	–
(South Africa) Dennis Visser	Lock	20 January 1993 (aged 24)	–	–	–	–
(South Africa) Carl Wegner	Lock	7 February 1991 (aged 26)	–	–	–	–
(South Africa) Jasper Wiese	Loose forward	21 October 1995 (aged 21)	–	–	–	–
(South Africa) Lihleli Xoli	Wing	28 February 1993 (aged 24)	–	–	–	–
(South Africa) Fred Zeilinga	Fly-half	11 December 1992 (aged 24)	–	–	–	–
Note: Players' ages and statistics are correct as of 1 September 2017, the date of the opening round of the competition. Pro14 appearances only.

=== Player movements ===
Player movements between the end of the 2017 Super Rugby season and the end of the 2017–18 Pro14 season are as follows:

Cheetahs transfers 2017–2018
Pos	2017 squad	Out	In	2017–18 players
PR	Tom Botha; Aranos Coetzee; Charles Marais; Danie Mienie; Ox Nché	(substituted off) Danie Mienie (to (France) Toulouse)	(substituted in) Luan de Bruin (from Free State Cheetahs); (substituted in) Erich de Jager (from Free State Cheetahs); (substituted in) Günther Janse van Vuuren (from Free State Cheetahs); (substituted in) Johan Kotze (from Free State Cheetahs)	Tom Botha; Aranos Coetzee; Luan de Bruin; Erich de Jager; Günther Janse van Vuuren (did not play); Johan Kotze (did not play); Charles Marais; Ox Nché
HK	Jacques du Toit (did not play); Joseph Dweba; Elandré Huggett; Torsten van Jaarsveld; Reinach Venter			Jacques du Toit; Joseph Dweba; Elandré Huggett (did not play); Torsten van Jaarsveld; Reinach Venter (did not play)
LK	Justin Basson; Reniel Hugo; Armandt Koster; Hilton Lobberts (did not play); Francois Uys; Dennis Visser (did not play); Carl Wegner	(substituted off) Francois Uys (to (France) Grenoble)	(substituted in) Rynier Bernardo (from (Wales) Scarlets); (substituted in) Ntokozo Vidima (from Free State Cheetahs)	Justin Basson; Rynier Bernardo; Reniel Hugo; Armandt Koster; Hilton Lobberts (did not play); Ntokozo Vidima (did not play); Dennis Visser; Carl Wegner
FL	Uzair Cassiem; Chris Dry; Oupa Mohojé; Junior Pokomela; Boom Prinsloo; Paul Schoeman; Henco Venter	(substituted off) Boom Prinsloo (to Bulls)	(substituted in) Daniel Maartens (from Free State Cheetahs); (substituted in) Gerhard Olivier (from Free State Cheetahs); (substituted in) Jasper Wiese (from Free State Cheetahs)	Uzair Cassiem; Chris Dry; Daniel Maartens; Oupa Mohojé; Gerhard Olivier; Junior Pokomela; Paul Schoeman; Henco Venter; Jasper Wiese
N8	Niell Jordaan			Niell Jordaan
SH	Tian Meyer; Zee Mkhabela; Ruan van Rensburg; Shaun Venter		(substituted in) JP Smith (from Free State Cheetahs)	Tian Meyer; Zee Mkhabela; JP Smith (did not play); Ruan van Rensburg (did not play); Shaun Venter
FH	Ryno Eksteen (did not play); Niel Marais; Fred Zeilinga		(substituted in) Johan Goosen (unattached); (substituted in) Robbie Petzer (from Griffons); (substituted in) Ernst Stapelberg (from Western Province)	Ryno Eksteen (did not play); Johan Goosen; Niel Marais; Robbie Petzer; Ernst Stapelberg; Fred Zeilinga
CE	Rayno Benjamin; Nico Lee; Ali Mgijima; William Small-Smith; Clinton Swart; Michael van der Spuy; Francois Venter	(substituted off) Michael van der Spuy (retired)	(substituted in) Tertius Kruger (from Griquas)	Rayno Benjamin; Tertius Kruger; Nico Lee; Ali Mgijima; William Small-Smith; Clinton Swart; Francois Venter
WG	JW Jonker; Luther Obi; Sergeal Petersen; Raymond Rhule	(substituted off) JW Jonker (to Free State Cheetahs)	(substituted in) Lloyd Greeff (from Free State Cheetahs); (substituted in) Makazole Mapimpi (from Southern Kings); (substituted in) Rabz Maxwane (from Blue Bulls); (substituted in) Rosko Specman (from South Africa Sevens); (substituted in) Lihleli Xoli (from Free State Cheetahs)	Lloyd Greeff; Makazole Mapimpi; Rabz Maxwane; Luther Obi; Sergeal Petersen; Raymond Rhule; Rosko Specman; Lihleli Xoli (did not play)
FB	Clayton Blommetjies		(substituted in) Cecil Afrika (from South Africa Sevens); (substituted in) Craig Barry (from Western Province); (substituted in) AJ Coertzen (from Griquas); (substituted in) Malcolm Jaer (from Southern Kings)	Cecil Afrika; Craig Barry; Clayton Blommetjies; AJ Coertzen; Malcolm Jaer
Coach	Franco Smith	(substituted off) Franco Smith (to Director of Rugby)	(substituted in) Rory Duncan (from Director of Rugby)	Rory Duncan

== Standings ==
The final Conference B log standings are:

2017–18 Pro14 Conference A
Pos	Team	P	W	D	L	PF	PA	PD	TF	TA	TB	LB	Pts
1	(Scotland) Glasgow Warriors	21	15	1	5	614	366	+248	81	38	12	2	76
2	(Ireland) Munster	21	13	1	7	568	361	+207	78	42	10	5	69
3	(South Africa) Cheetahs	21	12	0	9	609	554	+55	75	68	10	5	63
4	(Wales) Cardiff Blues	21	11	0	10	502	482	+20	56	59	5	5	54
5	(Wales) Ospreys	21	9	0	12	390	487	−97	44	60	5	3	44
6	(Ireland) Connacht	21	7	0	14	445	477	−32	53	54	5	6	39
7	(Italy) Zebre	21	7	0	14	408	593	−185	50	78	4	4	36

Legend and competition rules
Legend:
Conference leaders, qualify to play-off semifinals.	P = Games played, W = Games won, D = Games drawn, L = Games lost, PF = Points for, PA = Points against, PD = Points difference, TF = Tries for, TA = Tries against, TB = Try bonus points, LB = Losing bonus points, Pts = Log points
Second and third placed teams, qualified to play-off quarterfinals.	P = Games played, W = Games won, D = Games drawn, L = Games lost, PF = Points for, PA = Points against, PD = Points difference, TF = Tries for, TA = Tries against, TB = Try bonus points, LB = Losing bonus points, Pts = Log points
Competition rules:
Qualification: The top team in each conference qualified for the play-off semifinals, while the second and third placed teams qualified for the play-off quarterfinals. In the quarterfinals, the second-ranked team from each conference had home advantage against the third-ranked team from the other conference, with the winners progressing to the semi-finals. The conference winners had home advantage against the quarterfinal winners in the semifinals, with the two winners qualifying for the final, which was played at a venue decided in advance. Points breakdown: * 4 points for a win * 2 points for a draw * 1 bonus point for a loss by seven points or less * 1 bonus point for scoring four or more tries in a match Classification: Teams standings were calculated as follows: * League points * Number of games won * Overall points difference * Number of tries scored * Number of points scored * Overall try difference * Player suspension count * Player yellow card count * Toss of a coin

=== Round-by-round ===
The table below shows the Cheetahs' progression throughout the season. For each round, their cumulative points total is shown with the conference position:

Team	R1	R2	R3	R4	R5	R6	R7	R8	R9	R10	R11	R12	R13	R14	R15	R16	R17	R18	R19	R20	R21	QF	SF	Final
Opposition	ULS	MUN	ZEB	LEI	OSP	GLA	ZEB	CON	EDI	SCA	BEN	KIN	KIN	CAR	GLA	OSP	CON	DRA	CAR	MUN	KIN	SCA	—	—
Cumulative Points	0	0	5	10	15	16	20	20	25	29	30	35	40	41	41	43	47	52	57	58	63	Lost	—	—
Position	7th	7th	5th	3rd	3rd	3rd	3rd	3rd	3rd	3rd	3rd	3rd	3rd	3rd	3rd	3rd	3rd	3rd	3rd	3rd	3rd	Lost	—	—
Key:	win	draw	loss	bye																				

== Matches ==
The Cheetahs' fixtures for their inaugural season in Pro14 are:

1 September 2017	Ulster (Ireland)	42–19	Cheetahs	Kingspan Stadium, Belfast
19:35	Try: Tommy Bowe 18'; Alan O'Connor 26'; Stuart McCloskey 29'; Charles Piutau 32'; Louis Ludik 41'; Peter Nelson 74'; Con: John Cooney 27', 30'; Peter Nelson 75'; Pen: John Cooney 8', 55'	Report	Try: Clayton Blommetjies 15'; Makazole Mapimpi 20'; Sergeal Petersen 49'; Con: William Small-Smith 17', 22'; Cards: Henco Venter (yellow card) 26' to 36'; Aranos Coetzee (yellow card) 63' to 73'	Attendance: 14,448; Referee: Andrew Brace

9 September 2017	Munster (Ireland)	51–18	Cheetahs	Thomond Park, Limerick
17:15	Try: Tommy O'Donnell 6'; Alex Wootton 19', 34', 54', 60'; Jean Kleyn 48'; Chris Farrell 50'; Simon Zebo 71'; Con: Ian Keatley 7', 20', 50', 61'; Pen: Ian Keatley 3'; Cards: Jaco Taute (yellow card) 6' to 16'	Report	Try: William Small-Smith 41'; Henco Venter 80'; Con: Robbie Petzer 80'; Pen: Robbie Petzer 15', 24'	Attendance: 15,144; Referee: Ben Whitehouse

16 September 2017	Cheetahs	54–39	(Italy) Zebre	Toyota Stadium, Bloemfontein
19:30	Try: Makazole Mapimpi 18', 44'; William Small-Smith 27'; Luther Obi 31'; Torsten van Jaarsveld 51', 59'; Tian Meyer 66'; Sergeal Petersen 72'; Con: Ernst Stapelberg 28', 32', 46', 52', 60', 67', 73'	Report	Try: George Biagi 15'; Johan Meyer 36'; Mattia Bellini 56'; Failaga Afamasaga 63'; Giulio Bisegni 78'; Con: Carlo Canna 37'; Marcello Violi 57', 64'; Guglielmo Palazzani 79'; Pen: Carlo Canna 2', 9'; Cards: Dave Sisi (yellow card) 25' to 35'; George Biagi (yellow card) 50' to 60'	Attendance: 13,982; Referee: Andrew Brace

22 September 2017	Cheetahs	38–19	(Ireland) Leinster	Toyota Stadium, Bloemfontein
20:00	Try: William Small-Smith 36'; Torsten van Jaarsveld 43'; Ox Nché 55'; Luther Obi 80'; Con: Ernst Stapelberg 37', 56', 80'; Pen: Ernst Stapelberg 1', 9', 19', 25'	Report	Try: Barry Daly 5', 59', 72'; Con: Ross Byrne 60', 73'; Cards: James Tracy (yellow card) 43' to 53'	Attendance: 6,980; Referee: Mike Adamson

29 September 2017	Cheetahs	44–25	(Wales) Ospreys	Toyota Stadium, Bloemfontein
17:00	Try: Torsten van Jaarsveld 7', 18'; Makazole Mapimpi 39', 69'; Paul Schoeman 56'; Francois Venter 80'; Con: Ernst Stapelberg 19', 40', 57'; William Small-Smith 80'; Pen: Ernst Stapelberg 10', 50'; Cards: Torsten van Jaarsveld (yellow card) 63' to 73'	Report	Try: Rhys Webb 23'; Kieron Fonotia 31'; Dan Evans 72'; Con: Dan Biggar 24', 32'; Pen: Dan Biggar 38', 47'	Attendance: 4,589; Referee: Frank Murphy

6 October 2017	Cheetahs	26–29	(Scotland) Glasgow Warriors	Toyota Stadium, Bloemfontein
20:35	Try: Sergeal Petersen 11'; Rosko Specman 39'; Con: Ernst Stapelberg 12', 40'; Pen: Ernst Stapelberg 28', 57', 65', 75'	Report	Try: Callum Gibbins 32', 52'; Henry Pyrgos 69'; Rob Harley 76'; Con: Finn Russell 33', 54', 70'; Pen: Finn Russell 2'	Attendance: 5,964; Referee: George Clancy

28 October 2017	Zebre (Italy)	23–24	Cheetahs	Stadio Sergio Lanfranchi, Parma
20:00	Try: Matteo Minozzi 17'; Oliviero Fabiani 53'; Con: Carlo Canna 18', 54'; Pen: Carlo Canna 9', 14', 27'	Report	Try: Makazole Mapimpi 6', 58'; Con: Fred Zeilinga 60'; Pen: Ernst Stapelberg 3', 44', 49'; Fred Zeilinga 80'; Cards: Aranos Coetzee (yellow card) 52' to 62'	Attendance: 3,000; Referee: Dan Jones

4 November 2017	Connacht (Ireland)	23–15	Cheetahs	Galway Sportsgrounds, Galway
19:35	Try: Niyi Adeolokun 12'; Tom McCartney 48'; Con: Craig Ronaldson 13'; Jack Carty 49'; Pen: Craig Ronaldson 5', 29'; Steve Crosbie 73'	Report	Try: Shaun Venter 67'; Makazole Mapimpi 75'; Con: Fred Zeilinga 76'; Pen: Ernst Stapelberg 40'	Attendance: 6,012; Referee: Frank Murphy

24 November 2017	Cheetahs	33–13	(Scotland) Edinburgh	Toyota Stadium, Bloemfontein
19:30	Try: Craig Barry 26'; Rynier Bernardo 36'; Junior Pokomela 59'; Makazole Mapimpi 73'; Tian Meyer 80'; Con: Fred Zeilinga 27', 37', 60', 80'	Report	Try: Sam Hidalgo-Clyne 47'; Con: Sam Hidalgo-Clyne 47'; Pen: Sam Hidalgo-Clyne 43', 49'	Attendance: 3,648; Referee: Quinton Immelman

2 December 2017	Cheetahs	28–21	(Wales) Scarlets	Toyota Stadium, Bloemfontein
19:35	Try: William Small-Smith 24'; Craig Barry 58', 67'; Con: Fred Zeilinga 25', 59'; Pen: Fred Zeilinga 6', 15', 34'	Report	Try: James Davies 36'; Ioan Nicholas 62'; Con: Dan Jones 62'; Pen: Dan Jones 4', 18'; Tom Prydie 75'	Attendance: 3,457; Referee: Quinton Immelman

6 January 2018	Benetton (Italy)	27–21	Cheetahs	Stadio Comunale di Monigo, Treviso
14:15	Try: Monty Ioane 38'; Hame Faiva 58', 67'; Federico Ruzza 62'; Con: Marty Banks 62', 69'; Pen: Marty Banks 44'	Report	Try: Oupa Mohojé 45', 77'; Con: Fred Zeilinga 47'; Pen: Fred Zeilinga 8', 17', 31'; Cards: Torsten van Jaarsveld (yellow card) 54' to 64'; Shaun Venter (yellow card) 54' to 64'	Attendance: 3,500; Referee: Frank Murphy

13 January 2018	Southern Kings	21–45	Cheetahs	Nelson Mandela Bay Stadium, Port Elizabeth
17:00	Try: Yaw Penxe 7'; Eital Bredenkamp 52' penalty try 70'; Con: Oliver Zono 9', 53'	Report	Try: Clayton Blommetjies 5'; Nico Lee 19', 42', 73'; Shaun Venter 31'; Jacques du Toit 76'; Con: Fred Zeilinga 6', 20', 32', 43', 74', 77'; Pen: Fred Zeilinga 13'; Cards: Justin Basson (yellow card) 52' to 62'; Charles Marais (yellow card) 69' to 79'; Junior Pokomela (yellow card) 70' to 80'	Attendance: 6,711; Referee: Stuart Berry

20 January 2018	Cheetahs	45–24	Southern Kings	Toyota Stadium, Bloemfontein
17:00	Try: Nico Lee 19', 34'; Uzair Cassiem 25'; Ox Nché 44'; Makazole Mapimpi 48'; Shaun Venter 52'; Con: Fred Zeilinga 21', 26', 34', 45', 49', 53'; Pen: Fred Zeilinga 3'; Cards: Craig Barry (yellow card) 46' to 56'	Report	Try: Luzuko Vulindlu 10'; Schalk Ferreira 31'; Tienie Burger 72'; Con: Ntabeni Dukisa 11', 32'; Benhard Janse van Rensburg 72'; Pen: Ntabeni Dukisa 36'	Attendance: 5,522; Referee: Quinton Immelman

10 February 2018	Cardiff Blues (Wales)	25–20	Cheetahs	Cardiff Arms Park, Cardiff
19:35	Try: Rey Lee-Lo 17'; Ellis Jenkins 24'; Nick Williams 53'; Con: Jarrod Evans 18', 54'; Pen: Jarrod Evans 36', 69'	Report	Try: Ox Nché 4'; Uzair Cassiem 56'; Con: Fred Zeilinga 4', 57'; Pen: Fred Zeilinga 14', 44'; Cards: Rynier Bernardo (yellow card) 23' to 33'	Attendance: 4,703; Referee: Ian Davies

16 February 2018	Glasgow Warriors (Scotland)	37–23	Cheetahs	Scotstoun Stadium, Glasgow
19:35	Try: Nikola Matawalu 12'; Ruaridh Jackson 19'; Siua Halanukonuka 50'; George Horne 57'; Henry Pyrgos 68'; Con: Adam Hastings 13', 58', 69'; Pen: Adam Hastings 34', 67'	Report	Try: Malcolm Jaer 8'; Clayton Blommetjies 63'; Con: Niel Marais 9', 64'; Pen: Niel Marais 40', 45', 53'; Cards: Francois Venter (yellow card) 80'	Attendance: 7,351; Referee: George Clancy

24 February 2018	Ospreys (Wales)	27–26	Cheetahs	Liberty Stadium, Swansea
17:30	Try: Ashley Beck 42'; Sam Cross 53'; Ifan Phillips 78'; Con: Sam Davies 43', 54', 79'; Pen: Sam Davies 40', 68'	Report	Try: Torsten van Jaarsveld 9'; Reniel Hugo 14'; Nico Lee 45'; Craig Barry 56'; Con: Niel Marais 15', 47', 56'	Attendance: 3,842; Referee: Ben Whitehouse

3 March 2018	Cheetahs	26–25	(Ireland) Connacht	Toyota Stadium, Bloemfontein
17:35	Try: Uzair Cassiem 3'; Rabz Maxwane 60'; Con: Niel Marais 4', 61'; Pen: Niel Marais 9', 17', 24', 79'	Report	Try: Matt Healy 14', 20'; Eoin Griffin 57'; Con: Jack Carty 15', 58'; Pen: Jack Carty 38', 42'	Attendance: 6,095; Referee: Stuart Berry

24 March 2018	Dragons (Wales)	17–29	Cheetahs	Rodney Parade, Newport
19:35	Try: Ashton Hewitt 11'; Elliot Dee 70'; Con: Arwel Robson 13', 71'; Drop: Arwel Robson 27'	Report	Try: Rabz Maxwane 41', 61'; Fred Zeilinga 48'; Clayton Blommetjies 72'; Con: Niel Marais 41', 49'; Fred Zeilinga 73'; Pen: Niel Marais 18'	Attendance: 4,406; Referee: Nigel Owens

7 April 2018	Cheetahs	29–27	(Wales) Cardiff Blues	Toyota Stadium, Bloemfontein
14:00	Try: Rabz Maxwane 13', 38'; Francois Venter 23' penalty try 80'; Con: Niel Marais 25', 40'; Pen: Niel Marais 6'; Cards: Clayton Blommetjies (yellow card) 18' to 28'	Report	Try: Owen Lane 48'; Willis Halaholo 58'; Rey Lee-Lo 67'; Con: Steven Shingler 49', 59', 68'; Pen: Gareth Anscombe 2', 20'; Cards: Owen Lane (yellow card) 35' to 45'; Alex Cuthbert (yellow card) 77'; Brad Thyer (yellow card) 80'	Attendance: 5,269; Referee: Mike Adamson

13 April 2018	Cheetahs	17–19	(Ireland) Munster	Toyota Stadium, Bloemfontein
18:35	Try: Clayton Blommetjies 10'; Tian Meyer 28'; Con: Johan Goosen 11', 29'; Pen: Johan Goosen 39'	Report	Try: Conor Murray 36'; Con: JJ Hanrahan 36'; Pen: JJ Hanrahan 44', 52', 61'; Conor Murray 65'; Cards: Simon Zebo (yellow card) 17' to 27'	Attendance: 6,869; Referee: Mike Adamson

28 April 2018	Southern Kings	20–29	Cheetahs	Nelson Mandela Bay Stadium, Port Elizabeth
15:00	Try: Ntabeni Dukisa 4'; Harlon Klaasen 42'; Con: Masixole Banda 5', 43'; Pen: Masixole Banda 14', 22'	Report	Try: Paul Schoeman 18'; Niel Marais 28'; Uzair Cassiem 39'; Francois Venter 52'; Con: Niel Marais 19', 40', 53'; Pen: Niel Marais 2'	Attendance: 4,179; Referee: Cwengile Jadezweni

Quarterfinal	5 March 2018	(Wales) Scarlets	43–8	Cheetahs	Parc y Scarlets, Llanelli
	18:35	Try: Steff Evans 5', 36'; Leigh Halfpenny 16'; Tom Prydie 44'; James Davies 54'; Jonathan Evans 60'; Con: Leigh Halfpenny 6', 17'; Rhys Patchell 37', 44', 56'; Pen: Leigh Halfpenny 15'; Cards: Rhys Patchell (yellow card) 80'	Report	Try: Clayton Blommetjies 75'; Pen: Johan Goosen 21'	Attendance: 7,105; Referee: George Clancy

== Player statistics ==
The Pro14 appearance record for players that represented the Cheetahs in 2017–18 is as follows:

2017–18 Cheetahs player statistics
Player name	ULS	MUN	ZEB	LEI	OSP	GLA	ZEB	CON	EDI	SCA	BEN	KIN	KIN	CAR	GLA	OSP	CON	DRA	CAR	MUN	KIN	SCA	App	Try	Con	Pen	DG	Pts
Charles Marais	1	1	17 (substituted in)	1	1	1	17 (substituted in)	17 (substituted in)	1	1	1	17 (substituted in)	17 (substituted in)	17 (substituted in)	1	1	17 (substituted in)			17 (substituted in)	17 (substituted in)	17 (substituted in)	20	0	0	0	0	0
Jacques du Toit	2	2	16 (substituted in)	16 (substituted in)	16 (substituted in)	16 (substituted in)	16		16 (substituted in)	16 (substituted in)	16 (substituted in)	16 (substituted in)	2	16	16 (substituted in)	16 (substituted in)	16 (substituted in)	16 (substituted in)	16 (substituted in)	16	16 (substituted in)	16 (substituted in)	18	1	0	0	0	5
Aranos Coetzee	3	3	18 (substituted in)	18 (substituted in)	18 (substituted in)	18 (substituted in)	18 (substituted in)	3	3	3	3	18 (substituted in)	3	3	18 (substituted in)	3	3	3	3	3	3	3	22	0	0	0	0	0
Justin Basson	4	20 (substituted in)	4	4	4	4						4	4	4	4	4	4	4					13	0	0	0	0	0
Reniel Hugo	5	5	5	5	5	5	5	5	5	5	5	5	5		5	5	5	5	5	5	5	19 (substituted in)	21	1	0	0	0	5
Paul Schoeman	6	6	6	6	6	6	6	6	6	6	6	6		6	20 (substituted in)	6	6	6	6	6	6	6	21	2	0	0	0	10
Henco Venter	7	7	7	7	7	7						21 (substituted in)	6	20 (substituted in)	6	7	7	20 (substituted in)	20 (substituted in)	20 (substituted in)	20 (substituted in)	20 (substituted in)	17	1	0	0	0	5
Niell Jordaan	8	8																					2	0	0	0	0	0
Shaun Venter	9	9	9	21 (substituted in)	21 (substituted in)	21 (substituted in)	21 (substituted in)	22 (substituted in)	9	9	9	9	9	9	9	9							16	3	0	0	0	15
Clayton Blommetjies	10	15							15	15		15	15	15	15	15	15	15	15	15	15	15	15	6	0	0	0	30
Makazole Mapimpi	11	11	11	11	11	11	11	11	11	11	11	11	11										13	10	0	0	0	50
Ali Mgijima	12	22 (substituted in)						23 (substituted in)															3	0	0	0	0	0
William Small-Smith	13	12	12	12	12	12	12		13	13	14							14	14	14	14	14	15	4	3	0	0	26
Rosko Specman	14			14	23 (substituted in)	14																	4	1	0	0	0	5
Sergeal Petersen	15	14	15	15	15	15	15																7	3	0	0	0	15
Torsten van Jaarsveld	16 (substituted in)	16 (substituted in)	2	2	2	2	2	2	2	2	2	2		2	2	2	2	2	2	2	2	2	21	6	0	0	0	30
Ox Nché	17 (substituted in)	17 (substituted in)	1	17 (substituted in)	17 (substituted in)	17 (substituted in)	1	1	17 (substituted in)	17 (substituted in)	17 (substituted in)	1	1	1	17 (substituted in)	17 (substituted in)	1	1	1	1	1	1	22	3	0	0	0	15
Tom Botha	18 (substituted in)	18 (substituted in)	3	3	3	3	3	18 (substituted in)	18 (substituted in)	18 (substituted in)	18 (substituted in)	3	18 (substituted in)	18 (substituted in)			18 (substituted in)	18 (substituted in)	18 (substituted in)	18 (substituted in)	18 (substituted in)	18 (substituted in)	20	0	0	0	0	0
Rynier Bernardo	19 (substituted in)	4	19 (substituted in)	19 (substituted in)	19 (substituted in)	19 (substituted in)	4	20 (substituted in)	7	7	19 (substituted in)	19 (substituted in)	19 (substituted in)	5		19 (substituted in)	19 (substituted in)		19 (substituted in)	19 (substituted in)	19 (substituted in)	5	20	1	0	0	0	5
Gerhard Olivier	20 (substituted in)																						1	0	0	0	0	0
Tian Meyer	21 (substituted in)	21 (substituted in)	21 (substituted in)	9	9	9	9	9	21 (substituted in)	21 (substituted in)							21 (substituted in)	9	9	9	9	9	16	3	0	0	0	15
Cecil Afrika	22 (substituted in)		23 (substituted in)																				2	0	0	0	0	0
Rayno Benjamin	23 (substituted in)	23 (substituted in)																					2	0	0	0	0	0
Robbie Petzer		10																					1	0	1	2	0	8
Francois Venter (c)		13	13	13	13	13	13				13			13	13	13	13	13	13	13	13	13	16	3	0	0	0	15
Armandt Koster		19 (substituted in)																					1	0	0	0	0	0
Junior Pokomela			8	20 (substituted in)	20	20 (substituted in)	7	8	8	8	20 (substituted in)	20 (substituted in)	20 (substituted in)										10	1	0	0	0	5
Ernst Stapelberg			10	10	10	10	10	10															6	0	15	14	0	72
Luther Obi			14	23 (substituted in)		23 (substituted in)		14	14						23	23	11						6	2	0	0	0	10
Chris Dry			20 (substituted in)																				1	0	0	0	0	0
Nico Lee			22 (substituted in)	22 (substituted in)	22	22 (substituted in)	23 (substituted in)	12	12	12	12	13	13	12	12	12	12						14	6	0	0	0	30
Oupa Mohojé				8	8	8	8				7	7	7	7	7	20 (substituted in)	20 (substituted in)	7	7	7	7	7	16	2	0	0	0	10
Raymond Rhule					14		14																2	0	0	0	0	0
Carl Wegner							19 (substituted in)	4	4	4	4			19 (substituted in)	19 (substituted in)			19 (substituted in)	4	4	4	4	12	0	0	0	0	0
Jasper Wiese							20	7	19 (substituted in)	19													2	0	0	0	0	0
Fred Zeilinga							22 (substituted in)	15	10	10	10	10	10	10	22 (substituted in)	22 (substituted in)	22	10	22 (substituted in)				12	1	24	11	0	86
Tertius Kruger								13	22 (substituted in)	22													2	0	0	0	0	0
Joseph Dweba								16					16 (substituted in)										1	0	0	0	0	0
Dennis Visser								19 (substituted in)															1	0	0	0	0	0
Zee Mkhabela								21			21 (substituted in)	22 (substituted in)	22 (substituted in)	21 (substituted in)	21 (substituted in)	21 (substituted in)	9	21	21	21	21 (substituted in)	21 (substituted in)	9	0	0	0	0	0
Daniel Maartens									20 (substituted in)	20 (substituted in)													2	0	0	0	0	0
Craig Barry									23 (substituted in)	14	15	14	14	14	14	14	14						9	4	0	0	0	20
Rabz Maxwane										23 (substituted in)				11			23 (substituted in)	11	11	11	11	11	8	5	0	0	0	25
Uzair Cassiem											8	8	8	8	8	8	8	8	8	8	8	8	12	4	0	0	0	20
Niel Marais											22 (substituted in)	12	12	22 (substituted in)	10	10	10	12	10	12	10	12	12	1	14	10	0	63
AJ Coertzen											23 (substituted in)	23 (substituted in)	23 (substituted in)					23 (substituted in)	23 (substituted in)	23			5	0	0	0	0	0
Clinton Swart													21 (substituted in)					22 (substituted in)	12	22 (substituted in)	12	22 (substituted in)	6	0	0	0	0	0
Malcolm Jaer														23 (substituted in)	11	11							3	1	0	0	0	5
Luan de Bruin															3								1	0	0	0	0	0
Erich de Jager																18		17 (substituted in)	17 (substituted in)				2	0	0	0	0	0
Johan Goosen																				10	22 (substituted in)	10	3	0	2	2	0	10
Lloyd Greeff																					23 (substituted in)	23 (substituted in)	2	0	0	0	0	0
penalty try																							–	1	–	–	–	7
Total																							22	76	59	39	0	617

(c) denotes the team captain. For each match, the player's squad number is shown. Starting players are numbered 1 to 15, while the replacements are numbered 16 to 23. If a replacement made an appearance in the match, it is indicated by (substituted in) . "App" refers to the number of appearances made by the player, "Try" to the number of tries scored by the player, "Con" to the number of conversions kicked, "Pen" to the number of penalties kicked, "DG" to the number of drop goals kicked and "Pts" refer to the total number of points scored by the player.

- Ryno Eksteen, Elandré Huggett, Günther Janse van Vuuren, Johan Kotze, Hilton Lobberts, JP Smith, Ruan van Rensburg, Reinach Venter, Ntokozo Vidima and Lihleli Xoli did not make any appearances.

== See also ==
- Cheetahs
- Pro14
