= 2016 Under-20 Provincial Championship =

- Countries: South Africa
- Date: 27 May – 7 October 2016
- Champions: Griffons U20 (1st title)
- Runners-up: Boland U20
- Matches played: 59
- Tries scored: 556 (average 9.4 per match)
- Top point scorer: Jeandré Christian (212)
- Top try scorer: Shadward Fillies (20)

The 2016 Under-20 Provincial Championship was the 2016 edition of the Under-20 Provincial Championship, an annual national Under-20 rugby union competition held in South Africa. The competition was contested from 27 May to 7 October 2016. This season was the first season of a new Under-20 competition. Previously, all South African provincial unions competed in both an Under-21 and an Under-19 competition each season. That format was retained for the seven leading provincial unions at youth level, but the competition for the remaining eight provincial unions was changed to an Under-20 competition from 2016 onwards. The tournament was won by Griffons U20; they beat Boland U20 22–16 in the final played on 7 October 2016.

== Competition rules and information ==
There were eight participating teams in the 2016 Under-20 Provincial Championship. These teams played each other twice over the course of the season, once at home and once away.

Teams received four points for a win and two points for a draw. Bonus points were awarded to teams that scored four or more tries in a game, as well as to teams that lost a match by seven points or less. Teams were ranked by log points, then points difference (points scored less points conceded).

The top four teams qualified for the title play-off semi-finals. The team that finished first had home advantage against the team that finished fourth, while the team that finished second had home advantage against the team that finished third. The final was played as a curtain raiser for the 2016 Currie Cup First Division final.

== Teams ==
Location of teams in the 2016 Under-20 Provincial Championship

The following teams took part in the 2016 Under-20 Provincial Championship:

2016 Under-20 Provincial Championship teams
Team name	Stadium
Boland U20	Boland Stadium, Wellington
Border U20	Buffalo City Stadium, East London
Falcons U20	Barnard Stadium, Kempton Park
Griffons U20	HT Pelatona Projects Stadium, Welkom
Griquas U20	Griqua Park, Kimberley
Limpopo Blue Bulls U20	Peter Mokaba Stadium, Polokwane
Pumas U20	Mbombela Stadium, Mbombela
SWD U20	Outeniqua Park, George

== Standings ==
The final league standings for the 2016 Under-20 Provincial Championship were:

2016 Under-20 Provincial Championship standings
Pos	Team	P	W	D	L	PF	PA	PD	TF	TA	TB	LB	Pts
1	Griffons U20	14	11	2	1	635	313	+322	83	43	10	1	59
2	Boland U20	14	10	0	4	631	388	+243	92	54	13	2	55
3	SWD U20	14	10	1	3	616	376	+240	95	51	12	1	55
4	Limpopo Blue Bulls U20	14	9	2	3	496	353	+143	70	45	11	1	52
5	Pumas U20	14	7	0	7	479	427	+52	72	61	10	0	38
6	Griquas U20	14	2	0	12	357	521	−164	52	78	7	3	18
7	Falcons U20	14	2	2	10	301	736	−435	42	115	5	0	17
8	Border U20	14	1	1	12	177	578	−401	27	86	1	0	7
Final standings.

Legend and competition rules
Legend:
Top four teams qualified to the semi-finals.	P = Games played, W = Games won, D = Games drawn, L = Games lost, PF = Points for, PA = Points against, PD = Points difference, TF = Tries for, TA = Tries against, TB = Try bonus points, LB = Losing bonus points, Pts = Log points
Competition rules:
Play-offs: The top four teams qualified to the semi-finals, with the higher-placed team having home advantage. Points breakdown: * 4 points for a win * 2 points for a draw * 1 bonus point for a loss by seven points or less * 1 bonus point for scoring four or more tries in a match

=== Round-by-round ===
The table below shows each team's progression throughout the season. For each round, their cumulative points total is shown with the overall log position in brackets:

Team Progression – 2016 Under-20 Provincial Championship
Team	R1	R2	R3	R4	R5	R6	R7	R8	R9	R10	R11	R12	R13	R14	R15	R16	Semi	Final
Griffons U20	5 (2nd)	10 (2nd)	15 (1st)	20 (1st)	24 (1st)	24 (1st)	29 (1st)	34 (1st)	38 (1st)	38 (1st)	43 (1st)	45 (1st)	47 (1st)	52 (1st)	57 (1st)	59 (1st)	Won	Won
Boland U20	5 (1st)	10 (1st)	10 (3rd)	15 (2nd)	17 (2nd)	22 (2nd)	27 (2nd)	32 (2nd)	33 (2nd)	34 (2nd)	39 (2nd)	40 (3rd)	45 (2nd)	50 (2nd)	50 (2nd)	55 (2nd)	Won	Lost
SWD U20	1 (6th)	6 (4th)	11 (2nd)	11 (4th)	16 (4th)	16 (4th)	18 (4th)	23 (4th)	23 (4th)	28 (4th)	33 (4th)	35 (4th)	40 (4th)	45 (4th)	50 (3rd)	55 (3rd)	Lost	—
Limpopo Blue Bulls U20	1 (5th)	6 (3rd)	6 (5th)	11 (3rd)	16 (3rd)	21 (3rd)	26 (3rd)	27 (3rd)	32 (3rd)	34 (3rd)	39 (3rd)	44 (2nd)	44 (3rd)	49 (3rd)	49 (4th)	52 (4th)	Lost	—
Pumas U20	0 (7th)	1 (7th)	1 (8th)	1 (8th)	6 (7th)	7 (6th)	12 (5th)	17 (5th)	17 (5th)	22 (5th)	23 (5th)	28 (5th)	33 (5th)	33 (5th)	33 (5th)	38 (5th)	—	—
Griquas U20	0 (7th)	0 (8th)	1 (7th)	3 (7th)	4 (8th)	4 (8th)	6 (8th)	7 (7th)	11 (6th)	12 (6th)	12 (6th)	17 (6th)	17 (6th)	18 (6th)	18 (6th)	18 (6th)	—	—
Falcons U20	2 (3rd)	2 (6th)	3 (6th)	8 (5th)	8 (5th)	8 (5th)	8 (6th)	9 (6th)	9 (7th)	11 (7th)	11 (7th)	11 (7th)	12 (7th)	12 (7th)	17 (7th)	17 (7th)	—	—
Border U20	2 (3rd)	2 (5th)	7 (4th)	7 (6th)	7 (6th)	7 (7th)	7 (7th)	7 (8th)	7 (8th)	7 (8th)	7 (8th)	7 (8th)	7 (8th)	7 (8th)	7 (8th)	7 (8th)	—	—
Key:	win	draw	loss	bye														

== Matches ==
The following matches were played in the 2016 Under-20 Provincial Championship:

=== Round one ===
27 May 2016	Boland U20	61–43	SWD U20	Boland Stadium, Wellington
12:45	Try: Enzo Foutie 14'; André Manuel 22', 24', 41'; Michaine Fick 44'; Ruhan Marais 49'; Hendrik Carstens 63', 65'; Con: Hendrik Carstens 15', 23', 42', 45', 50', 66' (6/8); Pen: Hendrik Carstens 6', 55', 60' (3/3)	Scoreboard	Try: Lohan Potgieter 27', 32'; Winrey Stoffels 47'; Justin Bhana 68'; Lautaro Villegas Morales 73'; Robin Lolo 79'; Con: Winrey Stoffels 28', 33', 69', 74' (4/5); Francois Mc Knight 79' (1/1); Pen: Winrey Stoffels 3' (1/1)	Referee: Egon Seconds

27 May 2016	Griffons U20	30–25	Limpopo Blue Bulls U20	HT Pelatona Projects Stadium, Welkom
15:00	Try: Luciano Jones 32', 66'; Domenic Smit 56'; Riekert Botha 60'; Con: Robbie Petzer 33' (1/2); Jeandré Christian 67' (1/2); Pen: Robbie Petzer 20' (1/3); Jeandré Christian 73' (1/1)	Scoreboard	Try: Ruan Grundelingh 24'; Brendan O'Donoghue 27'; Gustave Boettger 80'; Con: Ronald van de Wetering 25', 28' (2/3); Pen: Ronald van de Wetering 1' (1/1); Theunis Sauer 64' (1/1)	Referee: Jaco Pretorius

27 May 2016	Border U20	22–22	Falcons U20	Buffalo City Stadium, East London
16:00	Try: Daniel Caku-Caku 17'; Sibongile Novuka 30'; Darren Lottering 38'; Con: Abongile Sonjica 31', 39' (2/3); Pen: Abongile Sonjica 4' (1/2); Siphelele Zono (0/1); Cards: Sibusiso Gwenxane (yellow card) 66'	Scoreboard	Try: Dias Meya 52'; Jan Kotze 61' penalty try 66'; Con: Bradley Robbins 62', 67' (2/3); Pen: Bradley Robbins 20' (1/2); Cards: Mike Smit (yellow card) 70'	Referee: Sindile Ngcese

Bye/s: Griquas U20, Pumas U20

=== Round two ===
3 June 2016	SWD U20	29–21	Griquas U20	NMMU Saasveld, George
15:30	Try: Justin Bhana 13'; Lohan Potgieter 20'; Shadward Fillies 68', 73'; Con: Winrey Stoffels 14', 21' (2/2); Francois Mc Knight 69' (1/2); Pen: Francois Mc Knight 36' (1/1)	Scoreboard	Try: Branden Terblanche 3'; Wilfred Bowers 24'; André Potgieter 70'; Con: Wilfred Bowers 4', 25' (2/2); Ruan Botha 71' (1/1); Pen: Wilfred Bowers (0/1); Ruan Botha (0/1)	Referee: Sindile Ngcese

3 June 2016	Border U20	7–46	Boland U20	Buffalo City Stadium, East London
17:00	Try: Siphosihle Magawu 53'; Con: Siphelele Zono 54' (1/1); Pen: Siphelele Zono (0/2)	Scoreboard	Try: André Manuel 3', 65', 68', 76'; Cyle Davids 5'; Keagan Fortune 25'; Benjamin Dwayi 41'; Con: Hendrik Carstens 4', 6', 26', 42' (4/7); Pen: Hendrik Carstens 60' (1/1)	Referee: Ruhan Meiring

4 June 2016	Pumas U20	22–47	Griffons U20	Witbank Stadium
15:00	Try: Cornelius van Rooyen 24'; Esje Esterhuyse 37'; Danick Pheiffer 58', 73'; Con: Esje Esterhuyse (0/2); André Grobler 38' (1/2); Pen: Esje Esterhuyse (0/1); Cards: Christo Swart (yellow card) 52' to 63'	Scoreboard	Try: Olwethu Msengana 6'; Stephen Pelser 17'; Riekert Botha 26'; Michael Herbert 64', 81'; Shirwin Cupido 70'; Con: Jeandré Christian 7', 18', 27' (3/4); Robbie Petzer 71' (1/2); Pen: Jeandré Christian 2', 48' (2/3); Drop: Robbie Petzer 60' (1/1)	Referee: Oregopotse Rametsi

4 June 2016	Limpopo Blue Bulls U20	55–3	Falcons U20	Old Peter Mokaba Stadium, Polokwane
15:00	Try: Salie Vermaak 1', 56'; Frans Botha 7'; Christiaan Wessels 26'; Ruan Grundelingh 34'; Juvan Stimie 60'; Dewald van der Vyver 66'; Reynhard Fourie 69'; Anthony Creighton 78'; Con: Ronald van de Wetering 8', 58' (2/5); Christiaan Wessels 61', 67', 69' (3/4)	Scoreboard	Pen: Bradley Robbins 72' (1/1)	Referee: Pieter Maritz

=== Round three ===
11 June 2016	Falcons U20	26–60	Griffons U20	Barnard Stadium, Kempton Park
12:00	Try: Mike Smit 22'; Nicolai Botha 28'; Kobus Kleyn 45'; Kobus Roets 61'; Con: Tinus Oosthuysen 29', 46', 62' (3/4)	Scoreboard	Try: Domenic Smit 6', 49'; Jeandré Christian 9'; Nazo Nkala 16'; Robbie Petzer 19', 25'; Francois Stemmet 54'; Riekert Botha 57'; Ernistus van Heerden 58'; Shirwin Cupido 70'; Con: Jeandré Christian 7', 20', 26', 55' (4/8); Robbie Petzer 59' (1/2)	Referee: Ricus van der Hoven

11 June 2016	Griquas U20	20–25	Border U20	Griqua Park, Kimberley
15:00	Try: Xolela Daniels 12'; Andries Kruger 36'; André Potgieter 65'; Con: Ruan Botha 13' (1/2); Marvin Fredericks (0/1); Pen: Ruan Botha (0/1); Marvin Fredericks 51' (1/1)	Scoreboard	Try: Daniel Caku-Caku 8'; Ruhan Sirgel 21'; Mihlali Mosi 39'; Siphelele Zono 56', 71'; Con: Mpilonhle Shange (0/1); Abongile Sonjica (0/4); Pen: Mpilonhle Shange (0/2)	Referee: Vusi Msibi

11 June 2016	Pumas U20	15–24	SWD U20	Witbank Stadium, Witbank
15:00	Try: Ruben Opperman 42'; Esje Esterhuyse 54'; Con: André Grobler 55' (1/2); Pen: André Grobler 60' (1/1)	Scoreboard	Try: Marnus Gruber 7'; Lunathi Nxele 31'; Shadward Fillies 38'; Francois Mc Knight 70'; Con: Francois Mc Knight 8', 71' (2/4); Pen: Francois Mc Knight (0/2)	Referee: Jaco Pretorius

Bye/s: Boland U20, Limpopo Blue Bulls U20

=== Round four ===
17 June 2016	Boland U20	32–13	Pumas U20	Boland Stadium, Wellington
15:00	Try: Michaine Fick 21', 39'; Enzo Foutie 70'; André Manuel 72'; Con: Hendrik Carstens 21', 39' (2/3); Cyle Davids 73' (1/1); Pen: Hendrik Carstens 2', 30' (2/2); Cards: André Manuel (yellow card) 55' to 66'; Michaine Fick (yellow card) 56' to 66'	Scoreboard	Try: Jacobus Fourie 47'; Ian Truter 66'; Con: André Grobler (0/1); Pen: André Grobler 4' (1/1); Cards: Kyle Davidson (yellow card) 39' to 49'	Referee: Jaco Kotze

18 June 2016	Falcons U20	33–30	Griquas U20	Barnard Stadium, Kempton Park
12:00	Try: Jaco van Dyk 4'; Kobus Roets 20'; Jan Kotze 45', 63'; Thapelo Khobotlo 72'; Con: Tinus Oosthuysen (0/1); Jan Kotze 21', 46', 64', 73' (4/4)	Scoreboard	Try: Wilfred Bowers 32'; Pieter Oosthuizen 48'; Andries Kruger 65'; Ruan Botha 76'; Con: Marvin Fredericks 33' (1/2); Pieter Snyman 66' (1/2); Pen: Marvin Fredericks 10' (1/2); Drop: Marvin Fredericks 38' (1/1)	Referee: Oregopotse Rametsi

18 June 2016	Griffons U20	40–24	SWD U20	HT Pelatona Projects Stadium, Welkom
15:00	Try: Shirwin Cupido 10'; Francois Stemmet 14'; Domenic Smit 38'; Robbie Petzer 46'; Con: Jeandré Christian 11', 15', 39', 47' (4/4); Pen: Jeandré Christian 3', 63', 70', 79' (4/4); Cards: Riekert Botha (yellow card) 56' to 66'	Scoreboard	Try: Marnus Gruber 59'; Lunathi Nxele 64'; Rodger van Wyk 75'; Con: Francois Mc Knight 60', 65', 76' (3/3); Pen: Francois Mc Knight 6' (1/1); Cards: Robin Lolo (yellow card) 78'	Referee: Paul Mente

18 June 2016	Limpopo Blue Bulls U20	55–3	Border U20	Old Peter Mokaba Stadium, Polokwane
15:00	Try: Lehlogonolo Kwenaite 5'; Marnus Koorts 17'; Salie Vermaak 27'; Jason André Pelser 38'; Frans Botha 48'; Juvan Stimie 52'; Ronald van de Wetering 59'; Lloyd Tshabalala 66'; André Mostert 76'; Con: Lehlogonolo Kwenaite 18', 28', 39', 49' (4/7); Emile le Roux 77' (1/2)	Scoreboard	Pen: Abongile Sonjica 16' (1/1)	Referee: Stephan Geldenhuys

=== Round five ===
24 June 2016	SWD U20	65–10	Falcons U20	Outeniqua Park, George
16:30	Try: Francois Mc Knight 7', 34'; Lohan Potgieter 12', 36', 75'; Michael Fernol 24'; Lunathi Nxele 26', 38'; Robin Lolo 42'; Aidin Joseph 46'; Rodger van Wyk 49'; Con: Francois Mc Knight 8', 13', 25', 27', 35' (5/10); Marnus Gruber (0/1)	Scoreboard	Try: Zayvier Hawley 20'; Brandon Swart 68'; Con: Jan Kotze (0/1); Tinus Oosthuysen (0/1); Pen: Jan Kotze (0/1); Tinus Oosthuysen (0/2)	Referee: Stephan Geldenhuys

25 June 2016	Griquas U20	20–32	Limpopo Blue Bulls U20	Mxolisi Dicky Jacobs Stadium, Upington
12:45	Try: Daniello Huyster 9', 60'; Wilfred Bowers 17'; Pieter Oosthuizen 27'; Con: Wilfred Bowers (0/3); Pieter Snyman (0/1); Pen: Wilfred Bowers (0/1); Cards: Hendrik Venter (yellow card) 75'	Scoreboard	Try: Marnus Koorts 6'; Frans Botha 34'; Brendan O'Donoghue 68'; Lloyd Tshabalala 77'; Con: Theunis Sauer 7' (1/1); Jeandré Rossouw 35', 69' (2/3); Pen: Jeandré Rossouw 49', 53' (2/2)	Referee: Paul Mente

25 June 2016	Boland U20	26–28	Griffons U20	Boland Stadium, Wellington
12:50	Try: Michaine Fick 18', 54'; Caleb Louw 43'; Colin April 49'; Con: Hendrik Carstens 19', 50', 55' (3/4); Drop: Keagan Fortune (0/1); Cards: Ndimphiwe Sobekwa (yellow card) 65' to 75'	Scoreboard	Try: Francois Stemmet 38'; Nazo Nkala 67'; Domenic Smit 71'; Con: Jeandré Christian 68', 72' (2/3); Pen: Jeandré Christian 4', 12', 62' (3/6)	Referee: Francois Pretorius

25 June 2016	Border U20	19–39	Pumas U20	Buffalo City Stadium, East London
14:00	Try: Mihlali Mosi 12'; Snish Mpontshane 46'; Ntando Mfengu 73'; Con: Abongile Sonjica 13', 47' (2/3); Cards: Daniel Caku-Caku (yellow card) 60' to 70'	Scoreboard	Try: Danick Pheiffer 19'; William Thomson 27'; Jacobus Fourie 38', 78'; Daniel Doubell 64'; Con: André Grobler 28', 39', 65' (3/4); Juandré Nel 79' (1/1); Pen: André Grobler 9', 31' (2/2)	Referee: Archie Sehlako

=== Round six ===
1 July 2016	Boland U20	39–27	Griquas U20	Boland Stadium, Wellington
15:00	Try: Enzo Foutie 11'; Kurt-Lee Arendse 21'; Colwyn Manchest 26', 46'; Jaiden Baron 68'; Con: Hendrik Carstens 12', 22', 27', 69' (4/5); Pen: Hendrik Carstens 3', 58' (2/3)	Scoreboard	Try: Daniello Huyster 31'; Wilfred Bowers 48'; Ruan van Rooyen 72'; Con: Wilfred Bowers 32', 49', 73' (3/3); Pen: Wilfred Bowers 19', 66' (2/2)	Referee: Jaco Pretorius

2 July 2016	Pumas U20	39–47	Limpopo Blue Bulls U20	Witbank Stadium, Witbank
15:00	Try: Ian Truter 8'; Bongani Zwane 12', 15'; Jean Els 38'; Daniel Doubell 64'; Con: Juandré Nel 9', 13', 16', 39' (4/4); Renier Appelgryn (0/1); Pen: Juandré Nel 4', 24' (2/2); Cards: Steven Pieterse (red card) 52'; Ruben Opperman (yellow card) 60' to 70'; Bongani Zwane (yellow card) 65' to 77'	Scoreboard	Try: Viaan van Heerden 25'; Jean-Pierre Snyman 32'; Theunis Sauer 36'; Frans Botha 69', 73'; Brendan O'Donoghue 76'; Emile le Roux 78'; Con: Theunis Sauer 26', 33', 37', 70', 74', 77' (6/7); Cards: Jean-Pierre Snyman (yellow card) 47'	Referee: Paul Mente

Bye/s: Border U20, Falcons U20, Griffons U20, SWD U20

=== Round seven ===
9 July 2016	Griquas U20	26–27	Pumas U20	Griqua Park, Kimberley
15:00	Try: Byron Qupa 42'; Andries Kruger 57', 75'; Gerhard Holtzhausen 64'; Con: Marvin Fredericks 43' (1/1); Ruan Botha 58' (1/2); André Potgieter 76' (1/1); Pen: Marvin Fredericks (0/1)	Scoreboard	Try: André Grobler 22'; Esje Esterhuyse 32', 46'; Ruaan du Preez 66'; Bongani Zwane 72'; Con: André Grobler 46' (1/5); Pen: André Grobler (0/1); Esje Esterhuyse (0/1)	Referee: Stephan Geldenhuys

9 July 2016	Falcons U20	21–69	Boland U20	Barnard Stadium, Kempton Park
12:30	Try: Tinus Oosthuysen 16'; Brandon Swart 27'; Ruan Janse van Rensburg 57'; Con: Tinus Oosthuysen 17', 28' (2/2); Brandon Swart 58' (1/1)	Scoreboard	Try: Heinrich Basson 2'; Enzo Foutie 18'; Michaine Fick 21', 69'; Kurt-Lee Arendse 35'; Hendrik Carstens 38'; Eugene Grootboom 48'; Caleb Louw 50'; Colin April 53'; André Manuel 73', 74'; Con: Hendrik Carstens 22', 36', 39', 49', 54' (5/8); André Manuel 70', 75' (2/3); Cards: Ndimphiwe Sobekwa (yellow card) 63' to 73'	Referee: Ricus van der Hoven

9 July 2016	Griffons U20	63–3	Border U20	HT Pelatona Projects Stadium, Welkom
12:45	Try: Riekert Botha 9'; Jeandré Christian 19', 33'; Nazo Nkala 38', 49'; Cornelius Jacobs 45'; Francois Stemmet 59'; Domenic Smit 76', 80'; Con: Jeandré Christian 10', 20', 34', 39', 46', 50', 60', 77' (8/8); Robbie Petzer 81' (1/1); Cards: Stephen Pelser (yellow card) 66' to 78'	Scoreboard	Pen: Jason Bantom 12' (1/2); Cards: Phumlani Thembani (yellow card) 56' to 66'; Siphosihle Magawu (yellow card) 76'	Referee: Jaco Kotze

9 July 2016	Limpopo Blue Bulls U20	31–28	SWD U20	Loftus Versfeld, Pretoria
14:50	Try: JP Alberts 5'; Jean-Pierre Snyman 12'; Diaan Coertze 38'; Jason Makhari 59'; Con: Theunis Sauer 6', 13', 39', 60' (4/4); Pen: Theunis Sauer 66' (1/2)	Scoreboard	Try: Shadward Fillies 22', 63'; Emile Booysen 35'; Aidin Joseph 48'; Con: Winrey Stoffels 23', 36', 49' (3/3); Francois Mc Knight 64' (1/1); Pen: Winrey Stoffels (0/1)	Referee: Oregopotse Rametsi

=== Round eight ===
15 July 2016	SWD U20	36–20	Border U20	Outeniqua Park, George
16:30	Try: Winrey Stoffels 2'; JP Duvenhage 18'; Aidin Joseph 38'; Clide Davids 42'; Stefan Gerber 62'; Lunathi Nxele 66'; Con: Winrey Stoffels 3', 19', 39' (3/4); Francois Mc Knight (0/2)	Scoreboard	Try: Andile Maki 20'; Mihlali Mosi 46'; Sinegugu Lituka 50'; Con: Abongile Sonjica 51' (1/3); Pen: Abongile Sonjica 64' (1/1); Cards: Thulani Njenje (yellow card) 77'	Referee: JD de Meyer

16 July 2016	Falcons U20	30–52	Pumas U20	Barnard Stadium, Kempton Park
12:00	Try: Kobus Kleyn 23'; Nicolai Botha 50'; Ruan Janse van Rensburg 53'; Raymond Labuschagné 73'; Lehan Steynsburg 80'; Con: Jan Kotze 24' (1/1); Tinus Oosthuysen (0/1); Brandon Swart (0/3); Pen: Jan Kotze 4' (1/1); Cards: Jan Kotze (yellow card) 42' to 50'	Scoreboard	Try: Ruaan du Preez 2'; André Grobler 11'; Ruben Opperman 38', 47'; Steven Pieterse 43'; Bongani Zwane 64'; Ian Truter 75'; Jean Els 77'; Con: André Grobler 3', 48', 78' (3/8); Pen: André Grobler 14', 35' (2/2); Cards: Cornelius van Rooyen (yellow card) 53' to 63'	Referee: Paul Mente

16 July 2016	Griquas U20	29–60	Griffons U20	Griqua Park, Kimberley
15:00	Try: Daniello Huyster 26'; Riandré Muller 55'; Xolela Daniels 68'; Coby Willemse 70'; Con: JP Roets 27', 56', 69' (3/4); Pen: JP Roets 16' (1/2); Cards: Andries Kruger (yellow card) 72'	Scoreboard	Try: Domenic Smit 2', 47', 60'; Francois Stemmet 12'; Robbie Petzer 24'; Stephanus Malherbe 28'; Fanie Vermaak 34'; Nazo Nkala 41'; Con: Jeandré Christian 3', 25', 29', 35', 42', 48', 61' (7/8); Pen: Jeandré Christian 6', 20' (2/2); Cards: Gideon van Eeden (yellow card) 63' to 73' (red card) 78'; Luciano Jones (yellow card) 75'	Referee: Ben Crouse

16 July 2016	Limpopo Blue Bulls U20	42–64	Boland U20	Old Peter Mokaba Stadium, Polokwane
15:00	Try: Jean-Pierre Snyman 4', 23'; JP Alberts 34'; Christiaan Wessels 64'; Driekus Kleynhans 73', 79'; Con: Salie Vermaak 5', 24', 35', 65', 74', 80' (6/6)	Scoreboard	Try: Michaine Fick 9', 38'; Kurt-Lee Arendse 13', 28'; André Manuel 16', 55'; Colin April 32'; Enzo Foutie 47', 61'; Jaiden Baron 77'; Con: Hendrik Carstens 10', 14', 17', 33', 56', 62', 78' (7/10); Cards: Andries Viljoen (yellow card) 78'	Referee: Stephan Geldenhuys

=== Round nine ===
29 July 2016	Boland U20	25–29	Limpopo Blue Bulls U20	Boland Stadium, Wellington
15:00	Try: Andries Viljoen 10'; Enzo Foutie 28'; Colwyn Manchest 69'; Con: Hendrik Carstens 11', 70' (2/3); Pen: Hendrik Carstens 4', 32' (2/2); Cards: Martin Shioma (yellow card) 73'	Scoreboard	Try: Frans Botha 19'; Juvan Stimie 35'; Christiaan Wessels 37'; Emile le Roux 71'; Con: Theunis Sauer 20', 36', 72' (3/4); Pen: Theunis Sauer 8' (1/1); Cards: Jean-Pierre Snyman (yellow card) 68' to 78'; Theunis Sauer (yellow card) 73'; Juvan Stimie (yellow card) 84'	Referee: Mpho Matsaung

29 July 2016	Border U20	7–19	Griquas U20	Buffalo City Stadium, East London
16:00	Try: Ruhan Sirgel 72'; Con: Abongile Sonjica 73' (1/1); Pen: Abongile Sonjica (0/1); Cards: Abongile Sonjica (yellow card) 55' to 65'	Scoreboard	Try: Riandré Muller 21'; Gerhard Holtzhausen 35'; Ulrich Sellar 54'; Con: JP Roets 22', 55' (2/3); Pen: JP Roets (0/2)	Referee: Jaco Kotze

30 July 2016	Griffons U20	31–22	Pumas U20	HT Pelatona Projects Stadium, Welkom
17:00	Try: Riekert Botha 30'; Nazo Nkala 58'; Stephanus Malherbe 80'; Con: Jeandré Christian 31', 59' (2/3); Pen: Jeandré Christian 5', 21', 55', 62' (4/6); Cards: Fanie Vermaak (yellow card) 33' to 43'; Michael Herbert (yellow card) 37' to 46'	Scoreboard	Try: Christo Swart 37'; Steven Pieterse 50'; Cornelius van Rooyen 77'; Con: Ruaan du Preez 38', 51' (2/3); Pen: André Grobler (0/2); Ruaan du Preez 46' (1/1); Cards: Juandré Nel (yellow card) 70'	Referee: Francois Pretorius

Bye/s: Falcons U20, SWD U20

=== Round ten ===
5 August 2016	SWD U20	49–33	Boland U20	Outeniqua Park, George
16:30	Try: Zavien Klaasen 14'; Clide Davids 38'; Anton Smit 41', 56'; Winrey Stoffels 48'; Maurice White 58'; Michael Fernol 72'; Shadward Fillies 79'; Con: Winrey Stoffels 49' (1/4); Maurice White 59' (1/2); Clide Davids 73' (1/2); Pen: Winrey Stoffels 27' (1/1); Cards: Rodger van Wyk (yellow card) 65' to 76'	Scoreboard	Try: Michaine Fick 23'; Enzo Foutie 32'; Jaiden Baron 35'; Benjamin Dwayi 53'; Louis Conradie 60'; Con: Hendrik Carstens 24', 33', 36' (3/4); Jermaine Jansen 61' (1/1); Cards: Sikhulule Khedama (yellow card) 47' to 58'	Referee: Paul Mente

5 August 2016	Pumas U20	57–24	Griquas U20	Mbombela Stadium, Mbombela
16:40	Try: Esje Esterhuyse 2'; Ian Truter 18', 56', 62'; Danick Pheiffer 21', 24', 54'; Steven Pieterse 32'; Armand Adlem 45'; Con: Juandré Nel 19', 25', 33', 46', 55' (5/8); Ruaan du Preez 63' (1/1)	Scoreboard	Try: Coby Willemse 12'; Gerhard Holtzhausen 42'; Daniello Huyster 70'; André Potgieter 79'; Con: Ruan Botha (0/1); Coby Willemse (0/1); Pieter Snyman 71' (1/1); André Potgieter 80' (1/1); Pen: Ruan Botha (0/1)	Referee: Ricus van der Hoven

6 August 2016	Falcons U20	22–22	Limpopo Blue Bulls U20	Barnard Stadium, Kempton Park
13:00	Try: Anthony Robertson 21'; Con: Jan Kotze 22' (1/1); Pen: Jan Kotze 2', 9', 41', 61', 64' (5/5); Cards: Ruan Janse van Rensburg (yellow card) 35' to 45'; Bradley Robbins (yellow card) 67' to 77'	Scoreboard	Try: JP Alberts 19'; Theunis Sauer 47'; Mike Jacobs 74'; Con: Theunis Sauer 20', 48' (2/2); JP Alberts (0/1); Pen: Theunis Sauer 60' (1/1); JP Alberts (0/1); Cards: Heinrich du Plessis (yellow card) 64' to 74'	Referee: Jaco Kotze

Bye/s: Border U20, Griffons U20

=== Round eleven ===
12 August 2016	Griffons U20	91–16	Falcons U20	HT Pelatona Projects Stadium, Welkom
13:30	Try: Robbie Petzer 4', 31', 76'; Nazo Nkala 8', 60', 74', 79'; Francois Stemmet 12', 43'; Luciano Jones 36'; Cornelius Jacobs 41', 57', 69'; Con: Jeandré Christian 5', 9', 13', 32', 37', 42', 44' (7/7); Robbie Petzer 58', 61', 70', 75', 77', 80' (6/6); Cards: Michael Herbert (yellow card) 27' to 37'; Stephen Pelser (yellow card) 52' to 62'	Scoreboard	Try: Jaco van Dyk 64'; Jean van Niekerk 81'; Con: Jan Kotze (0/2); Pen: Jan Kotze 6', 10' (2/2)	Referee: Mpho Matsaung

12 August 2016	Boland U20	53–10	Border U20	Boland Stadium, Wellington
15:00	Try: Eugene Grootboom 12'; Steven Stallenberg 24'; Colin April 45'; Michaine Fick 49'; Keagan Fortune 60'; André Manuel 69', 73'; Con: Hendrik Carstens 13', 25', 46', 61', 70', 74' (6/7); Pen: Hendrik Carstens 38', 39' (2/2)	Scoreboard	Try: Johan Crous 17'; Thulani Njenje 32'; Con: Siphamandla Josaya (0/2)	Referee: Ruhan Meiring

13 August 2016	SWD U20	64–29	Pumas U20	Outeniqua Park, George
14:00	Try: Robin Lolo 5'; Justin Bhana 15', 35'; Clide Davids 29', 55'; Michael Fernol 38'; Shadward Fillies 61', 63'; Zavien Klaasen 70'; Rodger van Wyk 76'; Con: Winrey Stoffels 6', 30', 36', 39', 62', 71', 77' (7/10); Cards: Emile Booysen (yellow card) 45' to 56'	Scoreboard	Try: Ruaan du Preez 12'; Danick Pheiffer 19'; Cornelius van Rooyen 34'; Armand Adlem 46'; Michael Rodrigues 80'; Con: Juandré Nel 13', 20' (2/4); André Grobler (0/1); Cards: Ruaan du Preez (yellow card) 27' to 37'	Referee: Paul Mente

13 August 2016	Limpopo Blue Bulls U20	45–20	Griquas U20	Loftus Versfeld B, Pretoria
15:00	Try: Jean-Pierre Snyman 5'; Wikus Botha 27'; Jason Makhari 41'; Marnus Koorts 47', 54'; Frans Botha 62'; Con: Jason Makhari 6', 28', 42', 48', 55', 63' (6/6); Pen: Jason Makhari 9' (1/1); Cards: Juvan Stimie (yellow card) 52'	Scoreboard	Try: Branden Terblanche 44'; Ryan Elliott 53'; Con: Pieter Snyman 45', 54' (2/2); Pen: Pieter Snyman 20', 32' (2/3)	Referee: Egon Seconds

=== Round twelve ===
19 August 2016	SWD U20	23–23	Griffons U20	Outeniqua Park, George
14:45	Try: Shadward Fillies 6'; Robin Lolo 18'; Justin Bhana 38'; Con: Keanen Tarantraal 19' (1/3); Pen: Keanen Tarantraal 34', 52' (2/4)	Scoreboard	Try: Domenic Smit 46'; Fanie Vermaak 58'; Con: Jeandré Christian 47', 59' (2/2); Pen: Jeandré Christian 10', 22', 54' (3/3)	Referee: Jaco Pretorius

19 August 2016	Pumas U20	46–33	Boland U20	Witbank Stadium, Witbank
15:00	Try: Esje Esterhuyse 19'; Ruaan du Preez 33'; Ian Truter 37'; Cornelius van Rooyen 53'; Danick Pheiffer 59', 68'; Con: Ruaan du Preez 20', 38', 54', 60', 69' (5/6); Pen: Ruaan du Preez 27', 39' (2/2)	Scoreboard	Try: Heinrich Basson 9'; Kurt-Lee Arendse 22'; Keagan Fortune 44'; Clarence van Wyk 61'; Caleb Louw 66'; Con: Hendrik Carstens 10', 23', 45' (3/3); Keagan Fortune 62' (1/2)	Referee: Sindile Ngcese

19 August 2016	Border U20	14–32	Limpopo Blue Bulls U20	Buffalo City Stadium, East London
16:00	Try: Daniel Caku-Caku 34'; Siphosihle Magawu 71'; Con: Sinegugu Lituka 35', 72' (2/2); Cards: Phumlani Thembani (yellow card) 18' to 28'; Siphosihle Magawu (yellow card) 50' to 61'; Juan-Pierre Heyns (yellow card) 61' to 72'	Scoreboard	Try: Mike Jacobs 31'; Marnus Koorts 44'; Jean-Pierre Snyman 51'; Juvan Stimie 61'; Con: Jason Makhari 32', 45', 52' (3/4); Pen: Jason Makhari 8', 18' (2/2); Cards: JP Alberts (yellow card) 22' to 32'	Referee: Francois Pretorius

20 August 2016	Griquas U20	55–12	Falcons U20	Griqua Park, Kimberley
11:45	Try: Pieter Snyman 6'; Xolela Daniels 24', 36'; Ruan Botha 34'; Coby Willemse 38'; Gerhard Holtzhausen 46', 58', 67'; Andries Kruger 63'; Con: Pieter Snyman 7', 25', 39', 47', 59' (5/9); Pen: Pieter Snyman (0/1)	Scoreboard	Try: Jan Kotze 53'; Jaco van Dyk 72'; Con: Jan Kotze 54' (1/1); Brandon Swart (0/1); Pen: Jan Kotze (0/2); Cards: Jan Kotze (yellow card) 62' to 72'	Referee: Mpho Matsaung

=== Round thirteen ===
27 August 2016	Falcons U20	28–99	SWD U20	Barnard Stadium, Kempton Park
12:30	Try: Nicolai Botha 37', 80'; Hardus Scott 44'; Stuart de Lacey 65'; Con: Jan Kotze 38' (1/1); Bradley Robbins 45', 66' (2/2); Mike Smit 81' (1/1); Cards: Magiel Buitendag (yellow card) 6' to 16'	Scoreboard	Try: Justin Bhana 1', 23', 56', 70', 75'; Anton Smit 7'; Zavien Klaasen 19'; Maurice White 21'; Shadward Fillies 34', 50', 63'; Jerome Lottering 46'; Dundre Maritz 54'; Aidin Joseph 58', 61'; Con: JP Duvenhage 2', 8', 24', 35', 51' (5/7); Keanen Tarantraal 22', 55', 57', 59' (4/5); Shadward Fillies 64' (1/1); Francois Mc Knight 71', 76' (2/2)	Referee: Mpho Matsaung

27 August 2016	Pumas U20	61–6	Border U20	Mbombela Stadium, Mbombela
15:00	Try: Armand Adlem 6'; André Grobler 11', 51'; Christo Swart 18'; Danick Pheiffer 43'; Jacobus Fourie 45'; Steven Pieterse 54'; Delmond Venske 63'; Ian Truter 65'; Con: Ruaan du Preez 7', 19', 44', 46', 52', 55', 64', 66' (8/9)	Scoreboard	Pen: Sinegugu Lituka 1', 47' (2/4)	Referee: Jaco Pretorius

27 August 2016	Griffons U20	32–36	Boland U20	HT Pelatona Projects Stadium, Welkom
17:00	Try: Riekert Botha 5'; Cornelius Jacobs 28'; Francois Stemmet 53'; Shirwin Cupido 77'; Con: Robbie Petzer 29' (1/2); Domenic Smit 54' (1/1); Jeandré Christian 78' (1/1); Pen: Robbie Petzer 9', 22' (2/2)	Scoreboard	Try: Enzo Foutie 10'; Colin April 24'; Barry Adonis 31', 79'; Willem Potgieter 61'; Con: Keagan Fortune 25', 32', 62', 80' (4/5); Pen: Keagan Fortune 60' (1/2); Cards: Barry Adonis (yellow card) 52' to 62'	Referee: Jaco Kotze

Bye/s: Griquas U20, Limpopo Blue Bulls U20

=== Round fourteen ===
3 September 2016	Griquas U20	31–43	SWD U20	Griqua Park, Kimberley
12:00	Try: Gerhard Holtzhausen 13', 38'; Daniello Huyster 77'; Byron Qupa 79'; Con: Pieter Snyman 14', 39' (2/2); Cleo Adams 78', 80' (2/2); Pen: Pieter Snyman 5' (1/1); Cards: Andries Kruger (yellow card) 63' to 73'	Scoreboard	Try: Maurice White 18'; Shadward Fillies 21', 32'; Winrey Stoffels 30'; Lunathi Nxele 39', 41'; Keanen Tarantraal 64'; Con: Winrey Stoffels 22', 31', 33', 65' (4/7); Cards: Lunathi Nxele (yellow card) 12' to 23'; Shane Olckers (yellow card) 73'	Referee: Ruhan Meiring

3 September 2016	Boland U20	61–21	Falcons U20	Boland Stadium, Wellington
14:00	Try: Caleb Louw 17'; Kurt-Lee Arendse 20', 34'; Luan du Randt 37'; Colin April 43'; Enzo Foutie 46'; Jermaine Jansen 48'; Keagan Fortune 64'; Yose Ngelethu 69'; Austin Hendricks 74'; Con: Hendrik Carstens 18', 38', 44', 51' (4/7); Keagan Fortune (0/2); Jermaine Jansen (0/1); Pen: Hendrik Carstens 9' (1/1); Cards: Benjamin Dwayi (yellow card) 73'	Scoreboard	Try: Jaco van Dyk 25'; Andrew Volschenk 52'; Karabo Makofane 81'; Con: Jan Kotze 26', 53', 82' (3/3); Cards: Teboho Mofokeng (yellow card) 60' to 70'; Lian Smit (yellow card) 77'	Referee: Pieter Maritz

3 September 2016	Border U20	14–39	Griffons U20	Buffalo City Stadium, East London
15:00	Try: Stian Terhoewen 46'; Sinegugu Lituka 59'; Con: Abongile Sonjica 47', 60' (2/2); Pen: Sinegugu Lituka (0/1)	Scoreboard	Try: JP Mans 3'; Lubabalo Mteyise 18'; Francois Stemmet 33'; Ernistus van Heerden 65', 81'; Riekert Botha 74'; Con: Jeandré Christian 19', 66', 82' (3/6); Pen: Jeandré Christian 24' (1/1); Cards: Fanie Vermaak (yellow card) 49' to 60' (red card) 80'	Referee: Ruhan Meiring

3 September 2016	Limpopo Blue Bulls U20	27–17	Pumas U20	Old Peter Mokaba Stadium, Polokwane
15:00	Try: Juvan Stimie 9'; Reynhard Fourie 50', 77'; Ruan Grundelingh 63'; Con: Theunis Sauer 51' (1/2); Jason Makhari 78' (1/1); Pen: Theunis Sauer 15' (1/1)	Scoreboard	Try: Steven Pieterse 38'; André Grobler 55', 70'; Con: Ruaan du Preez 39' (1/2); Juandré Nel (0/1); Pen: Ruaan du Preez (0/1)	Referee: Mpho Matsaung

=== Round fifteen ===
9 September 2016	Falcons U20	40–15	Border U20	Barnard Stadium, Kempton Park
13:30	Try: Jan Kotze 3', 39'; Eckhard van der Westhuizen 6'; Nicolai Botha 10'; Kobus Kleyn 14'; Jurie du Plessis 44'; Con: Jan Kotze 4', 11', 15', 40', 45' (5/6); Pen: Jan Kotze (0/1); Cards: Jean van Niekerk (yellow card) 26' to 36'; Jan Kotze (yellow card) 61' to 71'	Scoreboard	Try: Siphosihle Magawu 51'; Silindokuhle Ndike 71'; Mihlali Mosi 78'; Con: Abongile Sonjica (0/3); Cards: Sandile Buthelezi (yellow card) 9' to 19'; Thulani Njenje (red card) 19'	Referee: Pro Legoete

9 September 2016	SWD U20	36–22	Limpopo Blue Bulls U20	Outeniqua Park, George
16:30	Try: Shadward Fillies 1', 16'; Justin Bhana 11', 60', 78'; Con: Winrey Stoffels 2', 12', 17', 79' (4/5); Pen: Winrey Stoffels 49' (1/2); Cards: Dawid Daffue (yellow card) 35' to 45'	Scoreboard	Try: Juvan Stimie 38', 43'; JP Alberts 51'; Con: Theunis Sauer 39', 44' (2/3); Pen: Theunis Sauer 25' (1/1); Cards: Reynhard Fourie (yellow card) 48' to 58'	Referee: Pieter Maritz

10 September 2016	Griffons U20	59–15	Griquas U20	HT Pelatona Projects Stadium, Welkom
14:00	Try: Jeandré Christian 3'; Shirwin Cupido 18'; Ezrick Alexander 30'; Robbie Petzer 42'; Francois Stemmet 46'; Riekert Botha 58' penalty try 62'; Luciano Jones 67'; Francois van Niekerk 75'; Con: Jeandré Christian 19', 31', 43', 47' (4/5); Robbie Petzer 63', 68', 76' (3/4); Pen: Jeandré Christian (0/2)	Scoreboard	Try: Zayne Farmer 54'; Bradman Grove 56'; Con: Pieter Snyman 55' (1/2); Pen: Pieter Snyman 9' (1/1)	Referee: Egon Seconds

Bye/s: Boland U20, Pumas U20

=== Round sixteen ===
16 September 2016	Border U20	12–53	SWD U20	Hamilton Sports Club, East London
15:00	Try: Siphelele Zono 13'; Juan-Pierre Heyns 53'; Con: Sinegugu Lituka (0/1); Abongile Sonjica 54' (1/1)	Scoreboard	Try: Shadward Fillies 3', 68'; JP Duvenhage 25'; Lunathi Nxele 30'; Maurice White 33'; Clide Davids 56', 58', 71'; Justin Bhana 76'; Con: Winrey Stoffels 4', 26', 34' (3/8); Lunathi Nxele 77' (1/1)	Referee: Ruhan Meiring

17 September 2016	Griquas U20	20–53	Boland U20	Griqua Park, Kimberley
15:00	Try: Byron Qupa 10'; Coby Willemse 28'; Daniello Huyster 54'; Con: Daniello Huyster (0/1); Pieter Snyman 55' (1/2); Pen: Pieter Snyman 37' (1/1)	Scoreboard	Try: Kurt-Lee Arendse 15'; Colwyn Manchest 32', 34'; Colin April 44', 68'; Barry Adonis 52', 79'; Keagan Fortune 70'; Con: Hendrik Carstens 16', 33', 45' (3/5); Keagan Fortune 69', 71' (2/3); Pen: Hendrik Carstens 24' (1/2)	Referee: Oregopotse Rametsi

17 September 2016	Limpopo Blue Bulls U20	32–32	Griffons U20	Old Peter Mokaba Stadium, Polokwane
15:00	Try: Jason Makhari 19'; Juvan Stimie 22'; Theunis Sauer 31'; Mike Jacobs 36'; Con: Driekus Kleynhans 20', 23', 32' (3/4); Pen: Driekus Kleynhans 30' (1/1); Ronald van de Wetering 34' (1/1)	Scoreboard	Try: Gift Dlamini 51'; Cornelius Jacobs 61'; Con: Robbie Petzer 52', 62' (2/2); Pen: Robbie Petzer 10', 15', 25', 35', 39', 55' (6/8); Cards: Cornelius Jacobs (yellow card) 34'	Referee: Stephan Geldenhuys

17 September 2016	Pumas U20	40–17	Falcons U20	Witbank Stadium, Witbank
16:00	Try: Ruaan du Preez 1', 53'; Ruben Opperman 12', 61'; Danick Pheiffer 35', 77'; Con: Ruaan du Preez 2', 36', 54', 62' (4/5); André Grobler 78' (1/1); Cards: Delmond Venske (yellow card) 56' to 67'	Scoreboard	Try: Andrew Volschenk 32'; Louis Steyn 44'; Con: Jan Kotze 33', 45' (2/2); Pen: Jan Kotze 48' (1/1)	Referee: Pieter Maritz

=== Semi-finals ===
30 September 2016	Boland U20	41–27	SWD U20	Boland Stadium, Wellington
14:00	Try: Barry Adonis 9'; Kurt-Lee Arendse 48', 69'; Michaine Fick 62'; André Manuel 71'; Cyle Davids 79'; Con: Hendrik Carstens 10', 49', 63' (3/3); Keagan Fortune 80' (1/3); Pen: Hendrik Carstens 28' (1/3); Cards: André Manuel (yellow card) 78'	Scoreboard	Try: Zavien Klaasen 30'; Shadward Fillies 65', 81'; Con: Winrey Stoffels 31', 66' (2/2); Shane Olckers 82' (1/1); Pen: Winrey Stoffels 22', 55' (2/2)	Referee: Ricus van der Hoven

1 October 2016	Griffons U20	53–29	Limpopo Blue Bulls U20	HT Pelatona Projects Stadium, Welkom
15:00	Try: Francois Stemmet 5'; Robbie Petzer 17'; Jeandré Christian 32'; Fanie Vermaak 34'; Richman Gora 69'; Domenic Smit 76'; Gift Dlamini 80'; Con: Jeandré Christian 6', 18', 33', 35' (4/5); Robbie Petzer 77', 81' (2/2); Pen: Jeandré Christian 8', 48' (2/4)	Scoreboard	Try: Jason Makhari 27'; Jason André Pelser 38'; Theunis Sauer 50'; Juvan Stimie 71'; Frans Botha 78'; Con: Theunis Sauer (0/2); Jason Makhari 51', 72' (2/3); Cards: Jean-Pierre Snyman (yellow card) 16' to 26'; Dewald van der Vyver (yellow card) 56' to 66'	Referee: Paul Mente

=== Final ===
7 October 2016	Griffons U20	22–16	Boland U20	Olën Park, Potchefstroom
13:30	Try: Gift Dlamini 37'; Con: Jeandré Christian 38' (1/1); Pen: Jeandré Christian 3', 13', 15', 69', 75' (5/6); Drop: Robbie Petzer (0/2); Domenic Smit (0/1)	Scoreboard	Try: Colin April 56'; Con: Keagan Fortune 57' (1/1); Pen: Hendrik Carstens (0/1); Keagan Fortune 48', 53', 66' (3/3); Cards: Louis Conradie (yellow card) 17' to 28'	Referee: Sindile Ngcese

== Honours ==
The honour roll for the 2016 Under-20 Provincial Championship was as follows:

2016 Under-20 Provincial Championship
Champions:	Griffons U20
Top Points Scorer:	Jeandré Christian, Griffons U20 (212)
Top Try Scorer:	Shadward Fillies, SWD U20 (20)

== Players ==
=== Squads ===
The following squads were named for the 2016 Under-20 Provincial Championship:

Boland Under-20 squad
Forwards	Robin Adams • Colin April • Heinrich Basson • Christo Cloete • Louis Conradie • Cyle Davids • Luan du Randt • Benjamin Dwayi • Sachin Farmer • Eugene Grootboom • Moegamat Maker • Solomon Makhubela • Colwyn Manchest • Ruhan Marais • Aldridge Marthinus • Mojalefa Mosia • Simon Ndlovu • Yose Ngelethu • Willem Potgieter • Denver Prins • Martin Shioma • Ndimphiwe Sobekwa • Lixhanti Tame • Clarence van Wyk • Did not play: • Thulani Nkosinathi Njenje
Backs	Kirsten Adams • Barry Adonis • Kurt-Lee Arendse • Taylyne Barkley • Jaiden Baron • Hendrik Carstens • Michaine Fick • Keagan Fortune • Enzo Foutie • Austin Hendricks • Corben Isaacs • Jermaine Jansen • Sikhulule Khedama • Caleb Louw • Peter Louw • Milani Lubelwana • André Manuel • Joas Nare • Lorenzo Shandt • Steven Stallenberg • Andries Viljoen • Did not play: • Fabio Edwin Afrika • Niven Langdown
Unknown	Did not play: • Frans Gysbert Coetzee • Jacques Deus Damons • Cameron Wayde Davids • Isaiah Ignatius Marthinus Davids • Willem Albertus Liebenberg • Gerald Beyorgan van Heerden • Mark Visagie • Melton Carlyle Wentzel
Coach	Stanley Raubenheimer

Border Under-20 squad
Forwards	Gerhard Broodryk • Sandile Buthelezi • Daniel Caku-Caku • Johan Crous • Rudi du Randt • Sandi Gongxeka • Jean Grieb • Sibusiso Gwenxane • Lulamile Kama • Siphosihle Magawu • Lubabalo Magaza • Thabo Magaza • Yamikani Majali • Andile Maki • Wam Mbana • Sipho Mbusi • Mihlali Mosi • Avela Mqunjana • Thulani Njenje • Onele Sijila • Johannes Smit • Stian Terhoewen • Phumlani Thembani • Siphosethu Tsotsa • Did not play: • Nico Putter • Zola Wagosa
Backs	Jason Bantom • Keeran Bantom • Nathan Church • Luyolo Gwarube • Juan-Pierre Heyns • Siphamandla Josaya • Sinegugu Lituka • Darren Lottering • Qhama Masiza • Patric Mbangi • Ntando Mfengu • Siyamthanda Mgubo • Snish Mpontshane • Silindokuhle Ndike • Lithemba Ngcetane • Minenhle Ngidi • Sibongile Novuka • Ayabonga Pelani • Riaan Pretorius • Mpilonhle Shange • Ruhan Sirgel • Abongile Sonjica • Chuma Tukela • Darren Williams • Lusanda Xakwana • Siphelele Zono
Unknown	Did not play: • Canzi Benson Beni • Chabedi Amos Blou • Caidon Christo Classen • Zizibele Xhobani Dana • Sihlumile Gantsho • Joshua Manthe • Sithembiso Innocent Metshe • Lungelo Mgunculu • Sibelele Nkonyeni • Hanru Sirgel

Falcons Under-20 squad
Forwards	Lian Ambrosius • Katleho Baisang • Nicolai Botha • Stuart de Lacey • Ruan Janse van Rensburg • Jaun-Reno Jordaan • Dawid Kleynhans • Jan Kotze • Ruan Kotze • Raymond Labuschagné • Frank Letsie • Francois Malherbe • Dias Meya • Teboho Mofokeng • Lian Smit • Louis Steyn • Lehan Steynsburg • Pieter van der Lith • Eckhard van der Westhuizen • Donovan Venter • Ruan Vermeulen • Andrew Volschenk • Did not play: • Francois Coetzee • Marcel de Kock
Backs	Magiel Buitendag • Ashley Carr • Jurie du Plessis • Conrad Engelbrecht • Zayvier Hawley • Attie Jansen van Vuuren • Thapelo Khobotlo • Kobus Kleyn • Beaumont Labuschagné • Karabo Makofane • Moahloli Mbobo • Kabelo Nqhatsetseng • Tinus Oosthuysen • Bradley Robbins • Anthony Robertson • Kobus Roets • Hardus Scott • Mike Smit • Johan Strydom • Brandon Swart • Jaco van Dyk • Jean van Niekerk • Did not play: • Elvis Mosia
Unknown	Did not play: • Hermanus Lambertus Erasmus • Adolf Jacobus Ludick • Thabo More • Peter Lethu Mabanta Mphuthi • Samson Nelumoni • Msingathi Nyangiwe • Thato Thabo Kenny Pheleu • Jandré Venter

Griffons Under-20 squad
Forwards	Johannes Boshoff • Ruben Breedt • Klaus-André Cellar • Corné Cooper • Erich de Jager • Gift Dlamini • Jacques Henning • Michael Herbert • Cornelius Jacobs • Duke Jantjies • Stephanus Malherbe • JP Mans • Neo Mohapi • Stephen Pelser • Ferdinand Petrus Arends Pieterse • Francois Stemmet • Jacobus Uys • Gideon van Eeden • Francois van Niekerk • Fanie Vermaak • John Vorster • Wentzel Vorster
Backs	Ezrick Alexander • Riekert Botha • Jeandré Christian • Shirwin Cupido • Richman Gora • Luciano Jones • Olwethu Msengana • Lubabalo Mteyise • Siya Ngxesha • Nazo Nkala • Robbie Petzer • Domenic Smit • Biron Smith • Lee Swartz • Ernistus van Heerden
Unknown	Did not play: • Petrus Arnoldus Taljaard

Griquas Under-20 squad
Forwards	Rodney Bartlett • Jandré Briedenhann • Werner Goosen • Bradman Grove • Gerhard Holtzhausen • Arthur Jones • Ivandré Knoetze • Andries Kruger • Pieter Oosthuizen • Ulrich Sellar • Stefan Smit • Branden Terblanche • Alessandro Trelawney • Willem Uys • Ruan van Rooyen • Adrian van Zyl • Hendrik Venter • John-Duncan Vertue • LW Viljoen • Martin Visagie • Jason Whitecross
Backs	Keenan Abrahams • Cleo Adams • Ruan Botha • Wilfred Bowers • Xolela Daniels • Ryan Elliott • Zayne Farmer • Marvin Fredericks • Warren Hart • Daniello Huyster • Marco Marais • Riandré Muller • Leon Ndlovu • Steph Nel • André Potgieter • Byron Qupa • JP Roets • Pieter Snyman • JP Steyn • Coby Willemse
Unknown	Did not play: • Gerhard Badenhorst • Ignatius Thembekile Booysen • Ignatius van Breda Bothma • Dirk Jacobus Francois Hanekom • Cameron Huffke • Garth-Lee Young

Limpopo Blue Bulls Under-20 squad
Forwards	JP Alberts • Gustave Boettger • Anthony Creighton • Heinrich du Plessis • Reynhard Fourie • Michael Gibbley • Ruan Grundelingh • Luke Haynes • Robert Lehmann • Stanley Magwenzi • Muchineripi Mangenje • Dieter Meyer • Philip Myburgh • Jozua Naudé • Branley Odendaal • Brendan O'Donoghue • Jason André Pelser • Hans Schmidt • Johannes Smit • Jean-Pierre Snyman • Johan Steyn • Juvan Stimie • Lloyd Tshabalala • Stefan van den Berg • Dewald van der Vyver • Viaan van Heerden • Brendon van Rooyen • Bradley van Waardhuizen • Salie Vermaak
Backs	Frans Botha • Wikus Botha • Diaan Coertze • Samuel Cornelius • Jacobus Gouws • Michael Helmand • Mike Jacobs • Jean Kirsten • Driekus Kleynhans • Marnus Koorts • Lehlogonolo Kwenaite • Emile le Roux • Mokete Lesoro • Jason Makhari • André Mostert • Sijabulile Mpofu • Jeandré Rossouw • Theunis Sauer • Ronald van de Wetering • Johan Wells • Christiaan Wessels • Stefan Zerwick
Unknown	Did not play: • Tinus Barnard • Simon Bezuidenhout • Lean Claasen • Johan de Bod • Dalaney du Plessis • Devon Gouws • Jeandré Jones • Therance Kingsburgh • Surprise Ngaka Mathabela • Adam Erasmus Moolman • Edwin Nxumalo • Brandon Pretorius • Nathan Franscois Prinsloo • Francois Errol Thysse • Jakobus van Breda • Tyron Visagie

Pumas Under-20 squad
Forwards	Armand Adlem • Eric Basson • Tiaan Botha • Dwayne Botma • Dandré Brand • Joost Conradie • Kyle Davidson • Daniel Doubell • Jacobus Fourie • Hendrik Jansen van Rensburg • George Letshuma • Christian Lewies • Tebogo Namane • Steven Pieterse • Michael Rodrigues • Hermanus Scott • Leon Smal • Christo Swart • William Thomson • Piet van Niekerk • Cornelius van Rooyen • Delmond Venske • Did not play: • Burger Kriel
Backs	Renier Appelgryn • Lohan Bennett • Ruaan du Preez • Jean Els • Kyle Erasmus • Esje Esterhuyse • André Grobler • Marco Grobler • Clinton Kriel • Juandré Nel • Ruben Opperman • Danick Pheiffer • Gavin Pienaar • Oko Qwesha • Ian Truter • Christiaan van Rooyen • Bongani Zwane
Unknown	Did not play: • Keenan Coetzee • Brendon Coombes • Juan-Dre Francois van Heerden

SWD Under-20 squad
Forwards	Franco Adendorff • Emile Booysen • Dawid Daffue • Curt de Laan • Stefan Gerber • Zavien Klaasen • Pieter-Jan le Roux • Deveron Lindoor • Robin Lolo • Jerome Lottering • Abongile Mashwabane • Nathan Meilhon • Abraham Mostert • Shane Olckers • Leono Oosthuizen • Albresto Pietersen • Lohan Potgieter • Cecil Rittels • Anton Smit • Lautaro Villegas Morales • Did not play: • Thomas Swanepoel
Backs	Ruan Barnard • Justin Bhana • Shaun Booysen • Clide Davids • JP Duvenhage • Caae-Jay Ferendale • Michael Fernol • Shadward Fillies • Marnus Gruber • Aidin Joseph • Nathan Kemp • Clayton Kiewitz • Dundre Maritz • Francois Mc Knight • Lunathi Nxele • Winrey Stoffels • Keanen Tarantraal • Rodger van Wyk • Maurice White
Unknown	Did not play: • Koos de Haan • Stevano Olivier • Julio Alcurno Visagie
Coach	Eddie Myners

=== Points scorers ===
The following table contain points scored in the 2016 Under-20 Provincial Championship:

Top Ten point scorers
No	Player	Team	T	C	P	DG	Pts
1	Jeandré Christian	Griffons U20	5	53	27	0	212
2	Hendrik Carstens	Boland U20	3	55	15	0	170
3	Robbie Petzer	Griffons U20	9	18	9	1	111
4	Shadward Fillies	SWD U20	20	1	0	0	102
5	Winrey Stoffels	SWD U20	4	33	5	0	101
6	Jan Kotze	Falcons U20	6	18	9	0	93
7	Ruaan du Preez	Pumas U20	6	21	3	0	81
8	André Manuel	Boland U20	15	2	0	0	79
9	Theunis Sauer	Limpopo Blue Bulls U20	4	19	6	0	76
10	Justin Bhana	SWD U20	14	0	0	0	70

Other point scorers
No	Player	Team	T	C	P	DG	Pts
11	André Grobler	Pumas U20	6	10	6	0	68
12	Domenic Smit	Griffons U20	12	1	0	0	62
13	Michaine Fick	Boland U20	12	0	0	0	60
13	Danick Pheiffer	Pumas U20	12	0	0	0	60
15	Keagan Fortune	Boland U20	5	9	4	0	55
15	Francois Stemmet	Griffons U20	11	0	0	0	55
17	Jason Makhari	Limpopo Blue Bulls U20	4	12	3	0	53
18	Francois Mc Knight	SWD U20	3	15	2	0	51
19	Kurt-Lee Arendse	Boland U20	10	0	0	0	50
19	Enzo Foutie	Boland U20	10	0	0	0	50
19	Nazo Nkala	Griffons U20	10	0	0	0	50
22	Pieter Snyman	Griquas U20	1	13	5	0	46
23	Colin April	Boland U20	9	0	0	0	45
23	Juvan Stimie	Limpopo Blue Bulls U20	9	0	0	0	45
25	Lunathi Nxele	SWD U20	8	1	0	0	42
26	Frans Botha	Limpopo Blue Bulls U20	8	0	0	0	40
26	Riekert Botha	Griffons U20	8	0	0	0	40
26	Gerhard Holtzhausen	Griquas U20	8	0	0	0	40
26	Ian Truter	Pumas U20	8	0	0	0	40
30	Clide Davids	SWD U20	7	1	0	0	37
31	Wilfred Bowers	Griquas U20	4	5	2	0	36
32	Daniello Huyster	Griquas U20	7	0	0	0	35
33	Esje Esterhuyse	Pumas U20	6	0	0	0	30
33	Cornelius Jacobs	Griffons U20	6	0	0	0	30
33	Juandré Nel	Pumas U20	0	12	2	0	30
33	Lohan Potgieter	SWD U20	6	0	0	0	30
33	Jean-Pierre Snyman	Limpopo Blue Bulls U20	6	0	0	0	30
38	Abongile Sonjica	Border U20	0	9	3	0	27
38	Salie Vermaak	Limpopo Blue Bulls U20	3	6	0	0	27
40	Barry Adonis	Boland U20	5	0	0	0	25
40	Nicolai Botha	Falcons U20	5	0	0	0	25
40	Shirwin Cupido	Griffons U20	5	0	0	0	25
40	Aidin Joseph	SWD U20	5	0	0	0	25
40	Marnus Koorts	Limpopo Blue Bulls U20	5	0	0	0	25
40	Andries Kruger	Griquas U20	5	0	0	0	25
40	Colwyn Manchest	Boland U20	5	0	0	0	25
40	Ruben Opperman	Pumas U20	5	0	0	0	25
40	Steven Pieterse	Pumas U20	5	0	0	0	25
49	Maurice White	SWD U20	4	1	0	0	22
50	Keanen Tarantraal	SWD U20	1	5	2	0	21
50	Christiaan Wessels	Limpopo Blue Bulls U20	3	3	0	0	21
52	JP Alberts	Limpopo Blue Bulls U20	4	0	0	0	20
52	Xolela Daniels	Griquas U20	4	0	0	0	20
52	JP Duvenhage	SWD U20	2	5	0	0	20
52	Jacobus Fourie	Pumas U20	4	0	0	0	20
52	Luciano Jones	Griffons U20	4	0	0	0	20
52	Zavien Klaasen	SWD U20	4	0	0	0	20
52	Sinegugu Lituka	Border U20	2	2	2	0	20
52	Robin Lolo	SWD U20	4	0	0	0	20
52	Caleb Louw	Boland U20	4	0	0	0	20
52	Mihlali Mosi	Border U20	4	0	0	0	20
52	Jaco van Dyk	Falcons U20	4	0	0	0	20
52	Cornelius van Rooyen	Pumas U20	4	0	0	0	20
52	Coby Willemse	Griquas U20	4	0	0	0	20
52	Bongani Zwane	Pumas U20	4	0	0	0	20
66	Driekus Kleynhans	Limpopo Blue Bulls U20	2	3	1	0	19
66	André Potgieter	Griquas U20	3	2	0	0	19
66	Ronald van de Wetering	Limpopo Blue Bulls U20	1	4	2	0	19
69	Siphelele Zono	Border U20	3	1	0	0	17
70	Ruan Botha	Griquas U20	2	3	0	0	16
71	Armand Adlem	Pumas U20	3	0	0	0	15
71	Jaiden Baron	Boland U20	3	0	0	0	15
71	Daniel Caku-Caku	Border U20	3	0	0	0	15
71	Gift Dlamini	Griffons U20	3	0	0	0	15
71	Michael Fernol	SWD U20	3	0	0	0	15
71	Reynhard Fourie	Limpopo Blue Bulls U20	3	0	0	0	15
71	Ruan Grundelingh	Limpopo Blue Bulls U20	3	0	0	0	15
71	Mike Jacobs	Limpopo Blue Bulls U20	3	0	0	0	15
71	Kobus Kleyn	Falcons U20	3	0	0	0	15
71	Siphosihle Magawu	Border U20	3	0	0	0	15
71	Brendan O'Donoghue	Limpopo Blue Bulls U20	3	0	0	0	15
71	Tinus Oosthuysen	Falcons U20	1	5	0	0	15
71	Byron Qupa	Griquas U20	3	0	0	0	15
71	Anton Smit	SWD U20	3	0	0	0	15
71	Ernistus van Heerden	Griffons U20	3	0	0	0	15
71	Rodger van Wyk	SWD U20	3	0	0	0	15
71	Fanie Vermaak	Griffons U20	3	0	0	0	15
88	Bradley Robbins	Falcons U20	0	4	2	0	14
89	Marvin Fredericks	Griquas U20	0	2	2	1	13
89	Lehlogonolo Kwenaite	Limpopo Blue Bulls U20	1	4	0	0	13
89	JP Roets	Griquas U20	0	5	1	0	13
92	Cyle Davids	Boland U20	2	1	0	0	12
92	Emile le Roux	Limpopo Blue Bulls U20	2	1	0	0	12
92	Brandon Swart	Falcons U20	2	1	0	0	12
95	Heinrich Basson	Boland U20	2	0	0	0	10
95	Daniel Doubell	Pumas U20	2	0	0	0	10
95	Benjamin Dwayi	Boland U20	2	0	0	0	10
95	Jean Els	Pumas U20	2	0	0	0	10
95	Eugene Grootboom	Boland U20	2	0	0	0	10
95	Marnus Gruber	SWD U20	2	0	0	0	10
95	Michael Herbert	Griffons U20	2	0	0	0	10
95	Ruan Janse van Rensburg	Falcons U20	2	0	0	0	10
95	Stephanus Malherbe	Griffons U20	2	0	0	0	10
95	Riandré Muller	Griquas U20	2	0	0	0	10
95	Pieter Oosthuizen	Griquas U20	2	0	0	0	10
95	Jason André Pelser	Limpopo Blue Bulls U20	2	0	0	0	10
95	Kobus Roets	Falcons U20	2	0	0	0	10
95	Jeandré Rossouw	Limpopo Blue Bulls U20	0	2	2	0	10
95	Ruhan Sirgel	Border U20	2	0	0	0	10
95	Christo Swart	Pumas U20	2	0	0	0	10
95	Branden Terblanche	Griquas U20	2	0	0	0	10
95	Lloyd Tshabalala	Limpopo Blue Bulls U20	2	0	0	0	10
95	Andrew Volschenk	Falcons U20	2	0	0	0	10
114	Jermaine Jansen	Boland U20	1	1	0	0	7
114	Mike Smit	Falcons U20	1	1	0	0	7
116	Ezrick Alexander	Griffons U20	1	0	0	0	5
116	Gustave Boettger	Limpopo Blue Bulls U20	1	0	0	0	5
116	Wikus Botha	Limpopo Blue Bulls U20	1	0	0	0	5
116	Emile Booysen	SWD U20	1	0	0	0	5
116	Diaan Coertze	Limpopo Blue Bulls U20	1	0	0	0	5
116	Louis Conradie	Boland U20	1	0	0	0	5
116	Anthony Creighton	Limpopo Blue Bulls U20	1	0	0	0	5
116	Johan Crous	Border U20	1	0	0	0	5
116	Stuart de Lacey	Falcons U20	1	0	0	0	5
116	Jurie du Plessis	Falcons U20	1	0	0	0	5
116	Luan du Randt	Boland U20	1	0	0	0	5
116	Ryan Elliott	Griquas U20	1	0	0	0	5
116	Zayne Farmer	Griquas U20	1	0	0	0	5
116	Stefan Gerber	SWD U20	1	0	0	0	5
116	Richman Gora	Griffons U20	1	0	0	0	5
116	Bradman Grove	Griquas U20	1	0	0	0	5
116	Zayvier Hawley	Falcons U20	1	0	0	0	5
116	Austin Hendricks	Boland U20	1	0	0	0	5
116	Juan-Pierre Heyns	Border U20	1	0	0	0	5
116	Thapelo Khobotlo	Falcons U20	1	0	0	0	5
116	Raymond Labuschagné	Falcons U20	1	0	0	0	5
116	Darren Lottering	Border U20	1	0	0	0	5
116	Jerome Lottering	SWD U20	1	0	0	0	5
116	Andile Maki	Border U20	1	0	0	0	5
116	Karabo Makofane	Falcons U20	1	0	0	0	5
116	JP Mans	Griffons U20	1	0	0	0	5
116	Ruhan Marais	Boland U20	1	0	0	0	5
116	Dundre Maritz	SWD U20	1	0	0	0	5
116	Dias Meya	Falcons U20	1	0	0	0	5
116	Ntando Mfengu	Border U20	1	0	0	0	5
116	André Mostert	Limpopo Blue Bulls U20	1	0	0	0	5
116	Snish Mpontshane	Border U20	1	0	0	0	5
116	Olwethu Msengana	Griffons U20	1	0	0	0	5
116	Lubabalo Mteyise	Griffons U20	1	0	0	0	5
116	Silindokuhle Ndike	Border U20	1	0	0	0	5
116	Yose Ngelethu	Boland U20	1	0	0	0	5
116	Thulani Njenje	Border U20	1	0	0	0	5
116	Sibongile Novuka	Border U20	1	0	0	0	5
116	Stephen Pelser	Griffons U20	1	0	0	0	5
116	Willem Potgieter	Boland U20	1	0	0	0	5
116	Anthony Robertson	Falcons U20	1	0	0	0	5
116	Michael Rodrigues	Pumas U20	1	0	0	0	5
116	Hardus Scott	Falcons U20	1	0	0	0	5
116	Ulric Sellar	Griquas U20	1	0	0	0	5
116	Steven Stallenberg	Boland U20	1	0	0	0	5
116	Louis Steyn	Falcons U20	1	0	0	0	5
116	Lehan Steynsburg	Falcons U20	1	0	0	0	5
116	Stian Terhoewen	Border U20	1	0	0	0	5
116	William Thomson	Pumas U20	1	0	0	0	5
116	Dewald van der Vyver	Limpopo Blue Bulls U20	1	0	0	0	5
116	Eckhard van der Westhuizen	Falcons U20	1	0	0	0	5
116	Viaan van Heerden	Limpopo Blue Bulls U20	1	0	0	0	5
116	Francois van Niekerk	Griffons U20	1	0	0	0	5
116	Jean van Niekerk	Falcons U20	1	0	0	0	5
116	Ruan van Rooyen	Griquas U20	1	0	0	0	5
116	Clarence van Wyk	Boland U20	1	0	0	0	5
116	Delmond Venske	Pumas U20	1	0	0	0	5
116	Andries Viljoen	Boland U20	1	0	0	0	5
116	Lautaro Villegas Morales	SWD U20	1	0	0	0	5
175	Cleo Adams	Griquas U20	0	2	0	0	4
176	Jason Bantom	Border U20	0	0	1	0	3
177	Shane Olckers	SWD U20	0	1	0	0	2
—	penalty try	Falcons U20	1	0	0	0	5
—	penalty try	Griffons U20	1	0	0	0	5
* Legend: T = Tries, C = Conversions, P = Penalties, DG = Drop Goals, Pts = Points.

=== Discipline ===
The following table contains all the cards handed out during the tournament:

Red cards or multiple yellow cards
Player	Team	Sent off (straight red)	Temporarily suspended
Thulani Njenje	Border U20	1	1
Gideon van Eeden	Griffons U20	1	1
Steven Pieterse	Pumas U20	1	0
Jan Kotze	Falcons U20	0	3
Jean-Pierre Snyman	Limpopo Blue Bulls U20	0	3
Fanie Vermaak	Griffons U20	0	3
Michael Herbert	Griffons U20	0	2
Andries Kruger	Griquas U20	0	2
Siphosihle Magawu	Border U20	0	2
André Manuel	Boland U20	0	2
Stephen Pelser	Griffons U20	0	2
Ndimphiwe Sobekwa	Boland U20	0	2
Juvan Stimie	Limpopo Blue Bulls U20	0	2
Phumlani Thembani	Border U20	0	2

Single yellow cards
Player	Team	Sent off (straight red)	Temporarily suspended
Barry Adonis	Boland U20	0	1
JP Alberts	Limpopo Blue Bulls U20	0	1
Emile Booysen	SWD U20	0	1
Riekert Botha	Griffons U20	0	1
Magiel Buitendag	Falcons U20	0	1
Sandile Buthelezi	Border U20	0	1
Daniel Caku-Caku	Border U20	0	1
Louis Conradie	Boland U20	0	1
Dawid Daffue	SWD U20	0	1
Kyle Davidson	Pumas U20	0	1
Heinrich du Plessis	Limpopo Blue Bulls U20	0	1
Ruaan du Preez	Pumas U20	0	1
Benjamin Dwayi	Boland U20	0	1
Michaine Fick	Boland U20	0	1
Reynhard Fourie	Limpopo Blue Bulls U20	0	1
Sibusiso Gwenxane	Border U20	0	1
Juan-Pierre Heyns	Border U20	0	1
Cornelius Jacobs	Griffons U20	0	1
Ruan Janse van Rensburg	Falcons U20	0	1
Luciano Jones	Griffons U20	0	1
Sikhulule Khedama	Boland U20	0	1
Robin Lolo	SWD U20	0	1
Teboho Mofokeng	Falcons U20	0	1
Juandré Nel	Pumas U20	0	1
Lunathi Nxele	SWD U20	0	1
Shane Olckers	SWD U20	0	1
Ruben Opperman	Pumas U20	0	1
Bradley Robbins	Falcons U20	0	1
Theunis Sauer	Limpopo Blue Bulls U20	0	1
Martin Shioma	Boland U20	0	1
Lian Smit	Falcons U20	0	1
Mike Smit	Falcons U20	0	1
Abongile Sonjica	Border U20	0	1
Christo Swart	Pumas U20	0	1
Dewald van der Vyver	Limpopo Blue Bulls U20	0	1
Jean van Niekerk	Falcons U20	0	1
Cornelius van Rooyen	Pumas U20	0	1
Rodger van Wyk	SWD U20	0	1
Delmond Venske	Pumas U20	0	1
Hendrik Venter	Griquas U20	0	1
Andries Viljoen	Boland U20	0	1
Bongani Zwane	Pumas U20	0	1
* Legend: (red card) = Sent off, (yellow card) = Sin-binned

== Referees ==
The following referees officiated matches in the 2016 Under-20 Provincial Championship:

2016 Under-20 Provincial Championship referees
Referees	Ben Crouse • JD de Meyer • Stephan Geldenhuys • Jaco Kotze • Pro Legoete • Pieter Maritz • Mpho Matsaung • Ruhan Meiring • Paul Mente • Vusi Msibi • Sindile Ngcese • Francois Pretorius • Jaco Pretorius • Oregopotse Rametsi • Egon Seconds • Archie Sehlako • Ricus van der Hoven

== See also ==
- Currie Cup
- 2016 Currie Cup Premier Division
- 2016 Currie Cup First Division
- 2016 Currie Cup qualification
- 2016 Under-21 Provincial Championship
- 2016 Under-19 Provincial Championship
