= Robbie Petzer =

South African rugby union player

- Full name: Robert Jacobus Petzer
- Born: 13 February 1996 (age 30) Parys, South Africa
- Height: 1.85 m (6 ft 1 in)
- Weight: 91 kg (201 lb; 14 st 5 lb)
- School: Die Afrikaanse Hoërskool, Kroonstad, Noord-Kaap Hoërskool, Kimberley

Rugby union career
- Position: Fly-half / Centre
- Current team: Griffons
Youth career
- 2012: Griffons
- 2014: Griquas
- 2015: Western Province
- 2016: Griffons
Senior career
Years	Team	Apps	(Points)
2017	Griffons	1	(3)
2017	Free State Cheetahs	4	(47)
2017	Cheetahs	1	(8)
2018	SWD Eagles	8	(0)
2019–2020	Colorado Raptors	19	(106)
2019	→ Griffons	10	(32)
2021	Rugby ATL	15	(43)
2022	Pumas	2	(0)
2023–	Griffons		
- Correct as of 10 July 2022

Robert Jacobus Petzer (born 13 February 1996) is a South African rugby union player for Rugby ATL of the Major League Rugby (MLR) in the United States.

He previously played for the Glendale Raptors in the MLR. His regular position is fly-half.

== Rugby career ==
Petzer was born in Parys and initially attended high school in Kroonstad, where he earned a call-up to represent the Griffons at the Under-16 Grant Khomo Week in 2012. He then moved to Kimberley, where he was selected in the Griquas' Craven Week squad in 2014.

He joined the Western Province academy after school, but left Cape Town after just one year to return to the Griffons. He represented them in the 2016 Under-20 Provincial Championship, finishing as the competition's third highest points scorer with 111 points.

2018 turned out to be a whirlwind season for Petzer; he was named in the Griffons senior squad for the 2017 Rugby Challenge, and he made their first class debut for them in their match against the Free State XV in Welkom, where Petzer kicked one penalty in a 48–53 defeat. In the second half of the season, Petzer joined the Free State Cheetahs, and he made his Currie Cup debut for the team in a match against the Golden Lions. A few weeks later, injuries to a number of Cheetahs' Pro14 fly-halves — with Niel Marais, Fred Zeilinga, Ernst Stapelberg and Ryno Eksteen all injured — Petzer was called up into the squad and he started their second ever match, an 18–51 defeat to Irish side Munster in Limerick, with Petzer scoring eight of his side's points. While that was his last action in the Pro14, he made a further 3 starts for in the Currie Cup competition.

He moved to George prior to the 2018 season to join the SWD Eagles. He spent one season there before joining Major League Rugby side Glendale Raptors.
