= Carl Wegner =

South African rugby union player (born 1991)

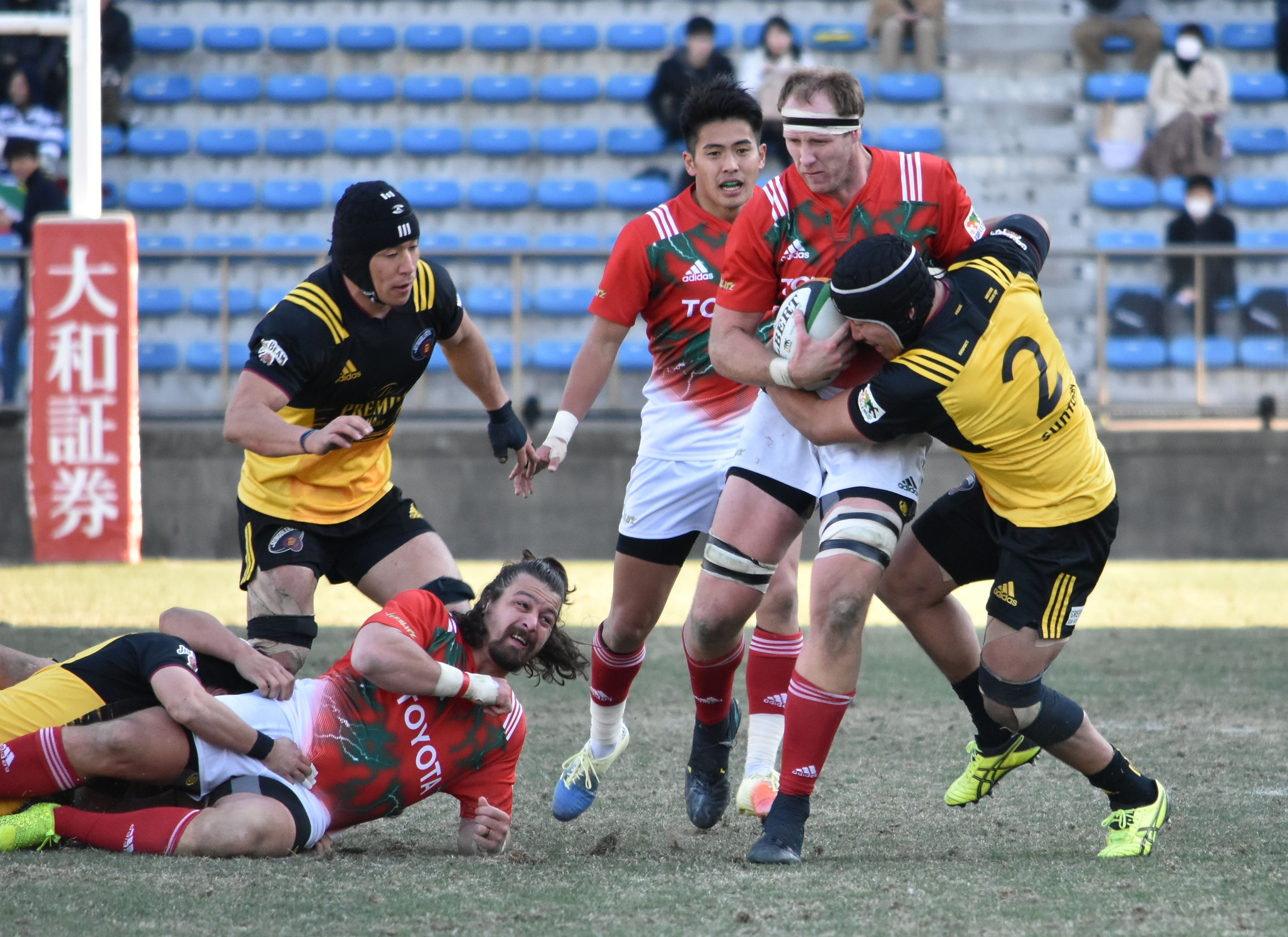
- Full name: Carl August Wegner
- Born: 7 February 1991 (age 35) Ficksburg, South Africa
- Height: 2.01 m (6 ft 7 in)
- Weight: 117 kg (18 st 6 lb; 258 lb)
- School: Grey College
- University: Central University of Technology

Rugby union career
- Position: Lock
- Current team: Cheetahs
Youth career
- 2009–2012: Free State Cheetahs
Amateur team(s)
Years	Team	Apps	(Points)
2012	CUT Ixias	6	(0)
Senior career
Years	Team	Apps	(Points)
2012	Free State Cheetahs	5	(0)
2012–2014	Stade Français	10	(0)
2014–2018	Cheetahs	54	(15)
2014–2017	Free State Cheetahs	13	(0)
2016	Free State XV	3	(5)
2018–2020	Toyota Verblitz	20	(5)
2020	Cheetahs	5	(0)
2020–2021	Free State Cheetahs	6	(5)
2021–2023	Benetton	20	(5)
2023–	Cheetahs		
- Correct as of 28 Oct 2022
International career
Years	Team	Apps	(Points)
2009	S.A. Schools		
2011	South Africa Under-20	2	(0)
- Correct as of 22 Apr 2018

Carl August Wegner (born 7 February 1991) is a South African rugby union player for the Cheetahs in the EPCR and the Currie Cup. His usual position is lock.

After the debut with Free State Cheetahs, he joined for French Top 14 team Stade Français from the end of 2012, but returned to Bloemfontein at the end of the 2013–14 Top 14 season to rejoin the Free State Cheetahs on a deal until the end of 2018. After the experience with Toyota Verblitz in the Japanese Top League, in 2020 he comes back in South Africa to rejoin with Free State Cheetahs and Cheetahs

In 2021 he signed for Italian United Rugby Championship team Benetton. He played fo Treviso in 2021−22 and 2022−23 season.

In 2011 Wegner played for the South Africa Under 20 team.
